= 2004 in Australian literature =

This article presents a list of the historical events and publications of Australian literature during 2004.

== Events ==
- John Hay, Peter Porter, Elizabeth Webby, W. H. Wilde, and Barbara Ker Wilson are all recognised in the 2004 Australia Day Honours.
- Peter Craven is sacked as editor of Quarterly Essay and the annual The Best Australian... anthologies after a dispute with Black Inc. publisher Morry Schwartz.
- Kenneth Dutton, Nick Enright, Morag Fraser, David Myers, and Brenda Niall are recognised in the Queen's Birthday honours list.
- Independent book publishers Text (Australia) and Canongate (UK) form a joint venture. The Text Media Group, purchased by John Fairfax earlier this year, sells Text Publishing to the joint venture partners.
- Sydney Morning Herald Literary Editor, Malcolm Knox exposes Norma Khouri and her 'factual' account of honour killings in Jordan as a fabrication.
- Mark Rubbo, David Marr and Kerryn Goldsworthy resign as Miles Franklin Award judges in protest at changes to the charter governing the award's administration.
- Inaugural Chief Minister's Northern Territory Book History Awards held

== Major publications ==
=== Literary fiction ===
- Sarah Armstrong – Salt Rain
- Larissa Behrendt – Home
- Carmel Bird – Cape Grimm
- Steven Carroll – The Gift of Speed
- John Charalambous – Furies
- Jon Cleary – Miss Ambar Regrets
- Bryce Courtenay – Brother Fish
- Sophie Cunningham – Geography
- Jack Dann – The Rebel: An Imagined Life of James Dean
- Nick Earls – The Thompson Gunner
- Robert Engwerda – Backwaters
- Susan Johnson – The Broken Book
- Gail Jones – Sixty Lights
- Stefan Laszczuk – The Goddamn Bus of Happiness
- Amanda Lohrey – The Philosopher's Doll
- Colleen McCullough – Angel Puss
- Andrew McGahan – The White Earth
- Monica McInerney – The Alphabet Sisters
- Emily Maguire – Taming the Beast
- Steven Orr – Hill of Grace
- Eva Sallis – Fire Fire
- Nicholas Shakespeare – Snowleg
- Celestine Hitiura Vaite – Frangipani
- Gerard Windsor – I Have Kissed Your Lips
- Charlotte Wood – The Submerged Cathedral
- Denise Young – The Last Ride
- Arnold Zable – Scraps of Heaven

=== Children's and Young Adult fiction ===
- Joanna Baker – Devastation Road
- Michael Gerard Bauer – The Running Man
- Sherryl Clark – Farm Kid
- Robert Corbert – Shelf Life
- Joanne Crawford and Grace Fielding – A Home for Bilby
- Anthony Eaton – Fireshadow
- Jon Flanagan – The Ruins of Gorlan
- Sonya Hartnett – The Silver Donkey
- Steven Herrick – By the River
- Joanne Horniman – Secret Scribbled Notebooks
- Prue Mason – Camel Rider
- James Moloney – The Book of Lies
- Garth Nix – Grim Tuesday
- Emily Rodda
  - Dragon's Nest
  - Isle of the Dead
  - Shadowgate
  - The Sister of the South
- Scott Westerfeld – So Yesterday

=== Crime ===
- Peter Corris – The Coast Road
- Colin Cotterill – The Coroner's Lunch
- Kathryn Fox – Malicious Intent
- Jane Goodall – The Walker
- Kerry Greenwood
  - Earthly Delights
  - Heavenly Pleasures
- Malcolm Knox – A Private Man
- Barry Maitland – No Trace
- Tara Moss – Covet
- Tony Park – Far Horizon
- Leigh Redhead – Peepshow
- Steve J. Spears – Murder by Manuscript

=== Romance ===
- Christine Balint – Ophelia's Fan
- Catherine Jinks – Spinning Around
- Stephanie Laurens – The Ideal Bride
- Rachael Treasure – The Stockmen
- Lynne Wilding – Outback Sunset

=== Science Fiction and Fantasy ===
- John Birmingham – Weapons of Choice
- John Brosnan – Mothership
- Alison Croggon – The Riddle
- Cecilia Dart-Thornton – The Iron Tree
- Marianne de Pierres – Nylon Angel
- Jennifer Fallon – Wolfblade
- Rob Gerrand — The Best Australian Science Fiction Writing : A Fifty Year Collection (edited)
- Richard Harland – The Black Crusade
- John Harwood – The Ghost Writer
- Simon Haynes – Hal Spacejock: Just Desserts
- Nathan Hobby – The Fur
- Liam Hearn – Brilliance of the Moon
- Ian Irvine – The Life Lottery
- Margo Lanagan – Black Juice
- Glenda Larke – The Tainted
- Maxine McArthur – Less than Human
- Fiona McIntosh
  - Blood and Memory
  - Bridge of Souls
- Sophie Masson – Snow, Fire, Sword
- Josephine Pennicott – A Fire in the Shell
- Matthew Reilly – Hover Car Racer
- Cherry Wilder and Katya Reimann – The Wanderer
- Kim Wilkins – Giants of the Frost
- Sean Williams – The Crooked Letter

=== Drama ===
- Bob Ellis and Robin McLachlan – A Local Man
- Martin Flanagan – The Call
- Michael Gurr – Julia 3
- Debra Oswald – Mr Bailey's Minder
- Abe Pogos – Toby
- Alana Valentine – Run Rabbit Run!
- David Williamson – Amigos

=== Poetry ===
- M. T. C. Cronin – <More or Less Than> 1–100
- Luke Davies – Totem
- Sarah Day – The Ship
- Noel Rowe – Next to Nothing
- Dipti Saravanamuttu – The Colosseum
- Samuel Wagan Watson – Smoke Encrypted Whispers

=== Non-fiction ===
- Peter Carey – Wrong About Japan: A Father's Journey with His Son
- Graeme Davison with Sheryl Yelland – Car Wars: How the Car Won Our Hearts and Conquered Our Cities
- Sally Neighbour – In the Shadow of Swords: on the Trail of Terrorism from Afghanistan to Australia

=== Biographies ===
- Michael Ackland – Henry Handel Richardson: A Life
- Phillip Adams – Adam's Ark
- Gay Bilson – Plenty: Digressions on Food
- Max Brown – Charmian and George: The Marriage of George Johnston and Charmian Clift
- Don Chipp – Keep the Bastards Honest
- Michael Duffy – Latham and Abbott
- Carolly Erikson – The Girl from Botany Bay: The True Story of Mary Broad and Her Extraordinary Escape
- Peter FitzSimons – Steve Waugh
- Tim Flannery – Country
- John Hughes – The Idea of Home: Autobiographical Essays
- John Marsden – I Am What I Am: My Life and Curious Times
- Siobhan O'Brien – A Life by Design: The Art and Lives of Florence Broadhurst
- Sue Pieters-Hawke and Hazel Flynn – Hazel's Journey: A Personal Experience of Alzheimer's
- Peter Roebuck – Sometimes I Forgot to Laugh
- Charles Tingwell – Bud: A Life
- Stevie Wright and Glenn Goldsmith – Hard Road: The Life and Times of Stevie Wright

== Awards and honours ==
Note: these awards were presented in the year in question.

=== Lifetime achievement ===
| Award | Author |
|---|---|
| Christopher Brennan Award | Kris Hemensley |
| Patrick White Award | Nancy Phelan |

=== Literary ===
| Award | Author | Title | Publisher |
|---|---|---|---|
| The Age Book of the Year Award | Luke Davies | Totem | Allen & Unwin |
| ALS Gold Medal | Laurie Duggan | Mangroves | University of Queensland Press |
| Colin Roderick Award | Alan Wearne | The Lovemakers | ABC Books |
| Colin Roderick Award | Tim Winton | The Turning | Picador |
| Nita Kibble Literary Award | Fiona Capp | That Oceanic Feeling | Allen & Unwin |

=== Fiction ===
==== International ====
| Award | Category | Author | Title | Publisher |
|---|---|---|---|---|
| Commonwealth Writers' Prize | Best Novel, SE Asia and South Pacific region | Michelle de Kretser | The Hamilton Case | Knopf |
| Commonwealth Writers' Prize | Best First Novel, SE Asia and South Pacific region | Nada Awar Jarrar | Somewhere, Home | Heineman |

==== National ====
| Award | Author | Title | Publisher |
|---|---|---|---|
| Adelaide Festival Awards for Literature | Kate Jennings | Moral Hazard | Picador |
| The Age Book of the Year Award | Andrew McGahan | The White Earth | Allen & Unwin |
| The Australian/Vogel Literary Award | Julienne van Loon | Road Story | Allen & Unwin |
| Miles Franklin Award | Shirley Hazzard | The Great Fire | Farrar Straus and Giroux |
| New South Wales Premier's Literary Awards | Brian Castro | Shanghai Dancing | Giramondo Publishing |
| Queensland Premier's Literary Awards | J. M. Coetzee | Elizabeth Costello | Secker & Warburg |
| Victorian Premier's Literary Award | Annamarie Jagose | Slow Water | Vintage Books |
| Western Australian Premier's Book Awards | Gail Jones | Sixty Lights | Random House |

=== Children and Young Adult ===
==== National ====
| Award | Category | Author | Title | Publisher |
|---|---|---|---|---|
| Children's Book of the Year Award | Older Readers | Melina Marchetta | Saving Francesca | Viking Books |
| Children's Book of the Year Award | Younger Readers | Carole Wilkinson | Dragon Keeper | Black Dog Books |
| Children's Book of the Year Award | Picture Book | Joan Grant, illus. Neil Curtis | Cat and Fish | Lothian |
| Children's Book of the Year Award | Early Childhood | Pamela Allen | Grandpa and Thomas | Viking Books |
| New South Wales Premier's Literary Awards | Children's | Kierin Meehan | Night Singing | Puffin Books |
| New South Wales Premier's Literary Awards | Young People's | David Metzenthen | Boys of Blood and Bone | Penguin Books |
| Queensland Premier's Literary Awards | Children's | Carole Wilkinson | Dragonkeeper | Black Dog Books |
| Queensland Premier's Literary Awards | Young Adult | Martine Murray | How to Make a Bird | Allen & Unwin |
| Victorian Premier's Literary Award | Young Adult Fiction | Margo Lanagan | Black Juice | Allen & Unwin |
| Western Australian Premier's Book Awards | Writing for Young Adults | Colin Bowles | Nights in the Sun | Penguin Books |
| Western Australian Premier's Book Awards | Children's | Mark Greenwood | The Legend of Lasseter's Reef | Cygnet |

=== Crime and Mystery ===
==== National ====
| Award | Category | Author | Title | Publisher |
|---|---|---|---|---|
| Davitt Award | Novel | Janette Turner Hospital | Due Preparations for the Plague | HarperCollins |
| Davitt Award | Readers' Choice | Lindy Cameron | Thicker Than Water | HarperCollins |
| Davitt Award | Young Adult Novel | Ruth Starke | Muck-Up Day | Lothian |
| Ned Kelly Award | Novel | Jon Cleary | Degrees of Connection | HarperCollins |
| Ned Kelly Award | First novel | Jane R. Goodall | The Walker | Hodder Headline |
| Ned Kelly Award | First novel | Wayne Grogan | Junkie Pilgrim | Brandl and Schlesinger |
| Ned Kelly Award | True crime | Peter Rees | Killing Juanita | Allen & Unwin |
| Ned Kelly Award | Lifetime achievement | Bob Bottom | | |

=== Science fiction ===
| Award | Category | Author | Title | Publisher |
|---|---|---|---|---|
| Aurealis Award | Novel | K. A. Bedford | Eclipse | Edge Science Fiction and Fantasy |
| Aurealis Award | Short Story | Trent Jamieson | "Slow and Ache" | Aurealis |
| Aurealis Award | Fantasy Novel | Juliet Marillier | Blade of Fortriu | Pan Macmillan |
| Aurealis Award | Fantasy Short Story | Richard Harland | "The Greater Death of Saito Saku" | Agog! (Daikaiju! Giant Monster Tales) |
| Aurealis Award | Fantasy Short Story | Rosaleen Love | "Once Giants Roamed the Earth" | Aqueduct Press (The Traveling Tide); Agog! (Daikaiju! Giant Monster Tales) |
| Aurealis Award | Horror Novel | No award. | | |
| Aurealis Award | Horror Short Story | Lee Battersby | "Pater Familias" | Shadowed Realms |
| Aurealis Award | Young Adult Novel | Isobelle Carmody | Alyzon Whitestarr | Penguin Books |
| Ditmar Award | Novel | K. J. Bishop | The Etched City | Prime Books |
| Ditmar Award | Novella/Novelette | Lucy Sussex | "La Sentinelle" | Southern Blood: New Australian Tales of the Supernatural |
| Ditmar Award | Short Story | Trudi Canavan | "Room for Improvement" | Forever Shores |
| Ditmar Award | Collected Work | Cat Sparks ed. | Agog! Terrific Tales | Agog! Press |
| Ditmar Award | Collected Work | Peter McNamara and Margaret Winch eds. | Forever Shores | Wakefield Press |

=== Poetry ===
| Award | Author | Title | Publisher |
|---|---|---|---|
| Adelaide Festival Awards for Literature | Dorothy Porter | Wild Surmise | Picador |
| The Age Book of the Year | Luke Davies | Totem | Allen & Unwin |
| Anne Elder Award | Lidija Cvetkovic | War is Not the Season for Figs | University of Queensland Press |
| Grace Leven Prize for Poetry | Luke Davies | Totem | Allen & Unwin |
| Mary Gilmore Prize | Michael Brennan | The Imageless World | Salt Publishing |
| New South Wales Premier's Literary Awards | Pam Brown | Dear Deliria: New & Selected Poems | Salt Publishing |
| Queensland Premier's Literary Awards | Judith Beveridge | Wolf Notes | Giramondo Publishing |
| Victorian Premier's Literary Award | Judith Beveridge | Wolf Notes | Giramondo Publishing |
| Western Australian Premier's Book Awards | Miriam Wei Wei Lo | Against Certain Capture | Five Islands Press |

=== Drama ===
| Award | Author | Title | Publisher |
|---|---|---|---|
| Patrick White Playwrights' Award | Stephen Carleton | Constance Drinkwater and the Final Days of Somerset | Playlab |

=== Non-Fiction ===
| Award | Category | Author | Title | Publisher |
|---|---|---|---|---|
| Adelaide Festival Awards for Literature | Non-Fiction | Rebe Taylor | Unearthed: The Aboriginal Tasmanians of Kangaroo Island | Wakefield Press |
| The Age Book of the Year | Non-Fiction | Peter Robb | A Death in Brazil | Duffy and Snellgrove |
| National Biography Award | Biography | Barry Hill | Broken Song: T.G.H. Strehlow and Aboriginal Possession | Knopf |
| New South Wales Premier's Literary Awards | Non-Fiction | Inga Clendinnen | Dancing with Strangers | Text Publishing |
| New South Wales Premier's History Awards | Australian History | Stuart Macintyre and Anna Clark | The History Wars | Melbourne University Press |
| New South Wales Premier's History Awards | Community and Regional History | Patricia Crawford and Ian Crawford | Contested Country: A History of the Northcliffe Area | University of Western Australia Press |
| New South Wales Premier's History Awards | General History | Edward Duyker | Citizen Labillardiere: A Naturalist's Life in Revolution and Exploration (1755–1834) | Melbourne University Press |
| New South Wales Premier's History Awards | Young People's | David Hollinsworth | They Took the Children | Working Title Press |
| Nita Kibble Literary Award | | Fiona Capp | That Oceanic Feeling | Allen and Unwin |
| Queensland Premier's Literary Awards | Non-fiction | Peter Robb | A Death in Brazil | Duffy and Snellgrove |
| Queensland Premier's Literary Awards | History | Inga Clendinnen | Dancing with Strangers | Text Publishing |
| Victorian Premier's Literary Award | Non-fiction | Graeme Davison | Car Wars: How the Car Won Our Hearts and Conquered Our Cities | Allen and Unwin |

== Deaths ==
- 3 January –
  - Len Fox, journalist, historian, social activist and painter (born 1905)
  - Barbara Jefferis, novelist and dramatist (born 1917)
- 8 January – Norman Talbot, poet (born 1936)
- 17 February – Bruce Beaver, poet (born 1928)
- 11 April – Wilbur G. Howcroft, writer for children (born 1917)
- 7 July – Elisabeth MacIntyre, writer for children (born 1916)
- 17 August – Thea Astley, novelist (born 1925)
- 8 November – Peter Mathers, novelist and short story writer (born 1931 in Fulham, England)

== See also ==
- 2004 in Australia
- 2004 in literature
- 2004 in poetry
- List of years in literature
- List of years in Australian literature
