= Aurealis Award for Best Science Fiction Short Story =

Aurealis Award for best science fiction short story
- Awarded for: Excellence in science fiction short stories
- Country: Australia
- Presented by: Chimaera Publications, Continuum Foundation
- First award: 1995
- Currently held by: Joanne Anderton
- Website: Official site

The Aurealis Awards are presented annually by the Australia-based Chimaera Publications and WASFF to published works in order to "recognise the achievements of Australian science fiction, fantasy, horror writers". To qualify, a work must have been first published by an Australian citizen or permanent resident between 1 January and 31 December of the corresponding year; the presentation ceremony is held the following year. It has grown from a small function of around 20 people to a two-day event attended by over 200 people.

Since their creation in 1995, awards have been given in various categories of speculative fiction. Categories currently include science fiction, fantasy, horror, speculative young adult fiction—with separate awards for novels and short fiction—collections, anthologies, illustrative works or graphic novels, children's books, and an award for excellence in speculative fiction. The awards have attracted the attention of publishers by setting down a benchmark in science fiction and fantasy. The continued sponsorship by publishers such as HarperCollins and Orbit has identified the award as an honour to be taken seriously.

The results are decided by a panel of judges from a list of submitted nominees; the long-list of nominees is reduced to a short list of finalists. The judges are selected from a public application process by the Award's management team.

This article lists all the short-list nominees and winners in the best science fiction short story category, as well as short stories that have received honourable mentions or have been highly commended. Since 2003, honourable mentions and high commendations have been awarded intermittently. Brendan Duffy and Sean Williams are the only people to have won the award multiple times, with two wins each. Stephen Dedman holds the record for most nominations and that for most nominations without winning, having been a losing finalist six times.

== Winners and nominees ==
In the following table, the years correspond to the year of the story's eligibility; the ceremonies are always held the following year. Each year links to the corresponding "year in literature" article. Entries with a blue background have won the award; those with a white background are the nominees on the short-list. If the short story was originally published in a book with other stories rather than by itself or in a magazine, the book title is included after the publisher's name.

* Winners and joint winners
* Nominees on the shortlist

Year	Author(s)	Short story	Publisher or publication	Ref
1995	Greg Egan*	"Luminous"	Asimov's	
1995	Stephen Dedman	"From Whom All Blessings Flow"	Asimov's	
1995	Greg Egan	"Mister Volition"	Interzone (#100)	
1995	Greg Egan	"Wang's Carpets"	Legend (New Legends)	
1995	Sean Williams	"A Map of the Mines of Barnath"	Eidolon	
1996	Leanne Frahm*	"Borderline"	MirrorDanse (Borderline)	
1996	Simon Brown	"The Mark of Thetis"	Eidolon (Australian magazine)	
1996	Terry Dowling	"His Own, The Star Alphecca"	Eidolon	
1996	Terry Dowling	"The Ichneumon and the Dormeuse"	Interzone (#106)	
1996	Geoffrey Maloney	"The Embargo Traders"	Aurealis (#16)	
1997	Janeen Webb & Jack Dann*	"Niagara Falling"	DAW (Black Mist and Other Japanese Futures)	
1997	Russell Blackford	"Lucent Carbon"	Eidolon	
1997	Damien Broderick	"Schrödinger's Dog"	Eidolon	
1997	Greg Egan	"Reasons to Be Cheerful"	Interzone (#118)	
1997	Lucy Sussex	"Merlusine"	Roc (The Horns of Elfland)	
1998	David J. Lake*	"The Truth About Weena"	Voyager (Dreaming Down-Under)	
1998	Stephen Dedman	"Transit"	Asimov's	
1998	Greg Egan	"Oceanic"	Asimov's	
1998	Rosaleen Love	"Real Men"	Voyager (Dreaming Down-Under)	
1998	Michael Pryor	"Australian Visions"	Aurealis (#20-21)	
1999	Chris Lawson*	"Written in Blood"	Asimov's	
1999	Terry Dowling	"The View in Nancy's Window"	Interzone (#146)	
1999	Chris Lawson	"Chinese Rooms"	Eidolon	
1999	Kate Orman	"The Bicycle Net"	Interzone (#146)	
1999	Lucy Sussex	"The Queen of Erewhon"	F&SF	
2000	Damien Broderick*	"Infinite Monkey"	Eidolon	
2000	Adam Browne	"Schrödinger's Catamaran"	Orb	
2000	Stephen Dedman	"The Devotee"	Eidolon	
2000	Margo Lanagan	"White Time"	Allen & Unwin (White Time)	
2000	Sean Williams	"The Land Itself"	Eidolon	
2001	Adam Browne*	"The Weatherboard Spaceship"	Aurealis (#27-28)	
2001	Michael Barry	"The Trojan Rocks"	CSFG Publishing (Nor of Human...)	
2001	Jack Dann	"The Diamond Pit"	F&SF	
2001	Dirk Strasser	"The Skerricks of Truth"	Aurealis (#27-28)	
2001	Lucy Sussex	"Absolute Uncertainty"	F&SF	
2002	Sean McMullen*	"Walk to the Full Moon"	F&SF	
2002	Shane M. Brown	"Late Returns"	Redsine	
2002	Shane M. Brown	"Lucy Lucy"	Aurealis (#29)	
2002	Geoffrey Maloney	"The Imperfect Instantaneous People Mover"	Agog! (Agog! Fantastic Fiction)	
2002	Chris McMahon	"Within Twilight"	Redsine	
2003	Brendan Duffy*	"Louder Echo"	Agog! (Agog! Terrific Tales)	
2003	Stephen Dedman	"Acquired Tastes"	Andromeda Spaceways Inflight Magazine	
2003	Sue Isle	"Amy's Stars"	Orb	
2003	Martin Livings	"Sigmund Freud & the Feral Freeway"	Agog! (Agog! Terrific Tales)	
2003	Kaaron Warren	"State of Oblivion"	CSFG Publishing (Elsewhere)	
2004	Brendan Duffy*	"Come to Daddy"	Agog! (Agog! Smashing Stories)	
2004	Stephen Dedman	"Desiree"	Oceans of the Mind	
2004	Geoffrey Maloney	"Bush of Ghosts"	Prime Books (Tales from the Crypto-System)	
2004	Barbara Robson	"Absolution"	Andromeda Spaceways Inflight Magazine	
2004	Cat Sparks	"Home by the Sea"	Orb	
2005	Trent Jamieson*	"Slow and Ache"	Aurealis (#36)	
2005	Rjurik Davidson	"The Interminable Suffering of Mysterious Mr. Wu"	Aurealis (#33-35)	
2005	Leanne Frahm	"Skein Dogs"	Fables and Reflections	
2005	Lyn Triffitt	"The Memory of Breathing"	Andromeda Spaceways Inflight Magazine	
2005	Kim Westwood	"Terning tha Weel"	Aurealis (#36)	
2006	Sean Williams*	"The Seventh Letter"	Bulletin Summer Reading Edition	
2006	Lee Battersby	"Dark Ages"	Prime Books (Through Soft Air)	
2006	David Conyers	"Aftermath"	Agog! (Agog! Ripping Reads)	
2006	Stephen Dedman	"Down to the Tethys Sea"	Science Fiction Chronicle	
2007	Cat Sparks*	"Hollywood Roadkill"	On Spec (#69)	
2007	Simon Brown	"Lonely as Life"	Ticonderoga Publications (Fantastic Wonder Stories)	
2007	Penelope Love	"Whitey"	Elise Bunter (Shadow Plays)	
2007	Chris McMahon	"The Eyes of Erebus"	Agog! (Daikaiju! 2: Revenge of the Giant Monsters)	
2007	Cat Sparks	"Arctica"	Ticonderoga Publications (Fantastic Wonder Stories)	
2008	Simon Brown*	"The Empire"	HarperVoyager (Dreaming Again)	
2008	Nathan Burrage	"Black and Bitter, Thanks"	Ticonderoga Publications (The Workers' Paradise)	
2008	Trent Jamieson	"Delivery"	Cosmos	
2008	Margo Lanagan	"The Fifth Star in the Southern Cross"	HarperVoyager (Dreaming Again)	
2008	Tansy Rayner Roberts	"Fleshy"	Twelfth Planet Press (2012)	
2009	Peter M. Ball*	"Clockwork, Patchwork and Ravens"	Apex Magazine (Descended From Darkness)	
2009	Peter M. Ball	"To Dream of Stars: An Astronomer's Lament"	Apex Magazine (#4)	
2009	Christopher Green	"A Hundredth Name"	Abyss & Apex (Q3 2009)	
2009	Greg Mellor	"Defence of the Realm"	Cosmos	
2009	Mike Resnick & Lezli Robyn	"Soulmates"	Asimov's	
2010	K. J. Bishop*	"The Heart of a Mouse"	Subterranean Online	
2010	Matthew Chrulew	"The Angaelian Apocalypse"	Twelfth Planet Press (The Company Articles of Edward Teach/The Angaelian Apocalypse)	
2010	Penelope Love	"Border Crossing"	Ticonderoga Publications (Belong)	
2010	Ian McHugh	"Interloper"	Asimov's	
2010	Tansy Rayner Roberts	"Relentless Adaptations"	Twelfth Planet Press (Sprawl)	
2011	Robert N. Stephenson*	"Rains of la Strange"	Coeur de Lion Publishing (Anywhere but Earth)	
2011	Joanne Anderton	"Flowers in the Shadow of the Garden"	Kayelle Press (Hope)	
2011	Rob Hood	"Desert Madonna"	Coeur de Lion Publishing (Anywhere but Earth)	
2011	Penelope Love	"SIBO"	Coeur de Lion Publishing (Anywhere but Earth)	
2011	Cat Sparks	"Dead Low"	Midnight Echo	
2012	Margo Lanagan*	"Significant Dust"	Twelfth Planet Press (Cracklescape)	
2012	James Bradley	"Visitors"	Review of Australian Fiction (Vol 2, No 3)	
2012	Greg Mellor	"Beyond Winter's Shadow"	Ticonderoga Publications (Wild Chrome)	
2012	Greg Mellor	"The Trouble With Memes"	Ticonderoga Publications (Wild Chrome)	
2012	Kaaron Warren	"The Lighthouse Keepers' Club"	PS Publishing (Exotic Gothic 4)	
2013	Kaaron Warren*	"Air, Water, and the Grove"	Pandemonimum Press (The Lowest Heaven)	
2013	Joanne Anderton	"The Last Tiger"	Daily Science Fiction	
2013	Joanne Anderton	"Mah Song"	FableCroft Publishing (The Bone Chime Song and Other Stories)	
2013	Thoraiya Dyer	"Seven Days in Paris"	Twelfth Planet Press (Asymmetry)	
2013	Lucy Stone	"Version 4.3.0.1"	Andromeda Spaceways Inflight Magazine (#57)	
2014	Thoraiya Dyer*	"Wine, Women, and Stars"	Analog	
2014	Deborah Biancotti	"The Executioner Goes Home"	Review of Australian Fiction (Vol 11, No 6)	
2014	Jason Fischer	"The Glorious Aerybeth"	On Spec (#97)	
2014	Charlotte Nash	"Dellinger"	Peggy Bright Books (Use Only As Directed)	
2014	Garth Nix	"Happy Go Lucky"	Twelfth Planet Press (Kaleidocscope)	
2015	Sean Williams*	"All the Wrong Places"	Solaris (Meeting Infinity)	
2015	Joanne Anderton	"2B"	FableCroft Publishing (Insert Title Here)	
2015	Claire McKenna	"The Marriage of the Corn King"	Cosmos	
2015	Charlotte Nash	"Alchemy and Ice"	Andromeda Spaceways Inflight Magazine (#61)	
2015	Kaaron Warren	"Witnessing"	The Canary Press Story Magazine (#6)	
2016	Samantha Murray*	"Of Sight, of Mind, of Heart"	Clarkesworld (#122)	
2016	Jack Dann	"Trainspotting in Winesburg"	PS Publishing (Concentration)	
2016	Ian McHugh	"The Baby Eaters"	Asimov's Science Fiction (Vol. 40 No. 1)	
2016	Claire McKenna	"The Autumn Dog Cannot Live to Spring"	FableCroft Publishing (In Your Face)	
2016	Kaaron Warren	"68 Days"	Broken Eye Books (Tomorrow's Cthulhu)	
2016	Jen White	"The Least of Things"	Aurealis (#94)	
2017	Garth Nix*	"Conversations with an Armoury"	Solaris (Infinity Wars)	
2017	Lyn Battersby	"The Missing Years"	Andromeda Spaceways Magazine (#66)	
2017	Aiki Flinthart	"A Little Faith"	Mirren Hogan (Like A Woman)	
2017	Pamela Jeffs	"Cards and Steel Hearts"	Falstaff Books (Lawless Lands: Tales from the Weird Frontier)	
2017	Amie Kaufman	"One Small Step"	HarperCollins Publishers (Begin, End, Begin: A #LoveOzYA Anthology)	
2017	Arthur Robinson	"Hurk + Dav"	Breach Issue #01	
2018	Jen White*	"The Astronaut"	Aurealis (#108)	
2018	E. J. Delaney	"The Sixes, The Wisdom and the Wasp"	Escape Pod (#612)	
2018	Pamela Jeffs	"The Fallen"	Four Ink Press (Red Hour)	
2018	Simon Petrie & Edwina Harvey	"On the Consequences of Clinically-Inhibited Maturation in the Common Sydney Octopus"	CSFG Publishing (A Hand of Knaves)	
2018	Robert Porteous	"A Fair Wind off Baracoa"	CSFG Publishing (A Hand of Knaves)	
2019	Joanne Anderton*	"Wreck Diving"	Aurealis (#123)	
2019	Mike Adamson	"Sky Tears"	Alien Dimensions (#17)	
2019	Jason Fischer	"Riding the Snails"	Clan Destine Press (War of the Worlds: Battleground Australia)	
2019	R. P. L. Johnson	"Canute"	Cohesion Press (SNAFU: Last Stand)	
2019	Freya Marske	"What We Named the Needle"	Analog (Jul/Aug 2019)	
2019	Angela Meyer	"Micro"	Kill Your Darlings Speculative Fiction and Fantasy Showcase 2019	
2020	Fiona Bell*	"Mary, Mary"	Aurealis (#135)	
2020	Elaine Cuyegkeng	"The Genetic Alchemist's Daughter"	Omnium Gatherum (Black Cranes: Tales of Unquiet Women)	
2020	Jack Heath	"Pork Belly"	Aurealis (#129)	
2020	T. R. Napper	"Jack's Fine Dining"	Grimdark Magazine (Neon Leviathan)	
2020	Ben Peek	"Andrei Tarkovsky"	Dimension6 (#20)	
2020	Deborah Sheldon	"All the Stars in Her Eyes"	Andromeda Spaceways Magazine (#80)	

== Honourable mentions and high commendations ==
The honourable mentions and high commendations are announced alongside the list of finalists for their respected year of eligibility. In the following table, the years correspond to the year of the book's eligibility; the ceremonies are always held the following year. Each year links to the corresponding "year in literature" article. Entries with a grey background have been noted as highly commended; those with a white background have received honourable mentions. If the short story was originally published in a book with other stories rather than by itself or in a magazine, the book title is included after the publisher's name.

* Highly commended
* Honourable mentions

Year	Author	Short story	Publisher or publication	Ref
2003	Shane Brown	"The Earth Equation"	Vision Writers Group (Glimpses)	
2003	Grace Dugan	"The Wall"	Vision Writers Group (Glimpses)	
2003	Trent Jamieson	"Clockwork"	Vision Writers Group (Glimpses)	
2003	Cat Sparks	"Cross the Nullabor to the Sea"	Vision Writers Group (Glimpses)	
2005	Tess Williams*	"How Green Was Their Love"	Borderlands	
2007	Dirk Flinthart	"Truckers"	Andromeda Spaceways Inflight Magazine	

== See also ==
- Ditmar Award, an Australian science fiction award established in 1969
