= Aurealis Award for Best Fantasy Short Story =

Literary award category

Aurealis Award for best fantasy short story
- Awarded for: Excellence in fantasy fiction short stories
- Country: Australia
- Presented by: Chimaera Publications, Continuum Foundation
- First award: 1995
- Currently held by: Baden M. Chant
- Website: Official site

The Aurealis Awards are presented annually by the Australia-based Chimaera Publications and WASFF to published works in order to "recognise the achievements of Australian science fiction, fantasy, horror writers". To qualify, a work must have been first published by an Australian citizen or permanent resident between 1 January and 31 December of the corresponding year; the presentation ceremony is held the following year. It has grown from a small function of around 20 people to a two-day event attended by over 200 people.

Since their creation in 1995, awards have been given in various categories of speculative fiction. Categories currently include science fiction, fantasy, horror, speculative young adult fiction—with separate awards for novels and short fiction—collections, anthologies, illustrative works or graphic novels, children's books, and an award for excellence in speculative fiction. The awards have attracted the attention of publishers by setting down a benchmark in science fiction and fantasy. The continued sponsorship by publishers such as HarperCollins and Orbit has identified the award as an honour to be taken seriously. Independently of Chimaera, the publishing industry announces results and winners especially when a publisher's author has won an award, genre databases list the award and its winners and libraries and review sites recommend books on the basis they have won the award.

The results are decided by a panel of judges from a list of submitted nominees; the long-list of nominees is reduced to a short-list of finalists. Ties can occur if the panel decides both entries show equal merit, however they are encouraged to choose a single winner. The judges may declare a "no award" if there is unanimous agreement that none of the nominees are worthy. The judges are selected from a public application process by the Award's management team.

This article lists all the short-list nominees and winners in the best fantasy short story category, as well as short stories that have received honourable mentions or have been highly commended. Since 2003, honourable mentions and high commendations have been awarded intermittently. Thoraiya Dyer holds the record for most wins, having won three times. Angela Slatter holds the record for most nominations, having been nominated seven times. Adam Browne, Kaaron Warren, and Suzanne J. Willis share the record for most nominations without winning, each having been losing finalists three times.

== Winners and nominees ==
In the following table, the years correspond to the year of the story's eligibility; the ceremonies are always held the following year. Each year links to the corresponding "year in literature" article. Entries with a blue background have won the award; those with a white background are the nominees on the short-list. If the short story was originally published in a book with other stories rather than by itself or in a magazine, the book title is included after the publisher's name.

* Winners and joint winners
* Nominees on the shortlist

Year	Author(s)	Short story	Publisher or publication	Ref.
1995	Karen Attard*	"Harvest Bay"	Eidolon	
1995	Petrina Smith	"Angel Thing"	Sybylla (She's Fantastical)	
1995	John T. Stolarczyk	"Sail On, Sail On"	Aurealis	
1995	Kaaron Warren	"The Blue Stream"	Aurealis	
1995	Andrew Whitmore	"The Other Side of Paradise"	Eidolon	
1996	Russell Blackford*	"The Sword of God"	Penguin (Dream Weavers)	
1996	Isobelle Carmody	"Green Monkey Dreams"	Viking (Green Monkey Dreams)	
1996	Matthew Condon	"Tattoo"	UQP (Original Sin)	
1996	Sara Douglass	"Of Fingers and Foreskins"	Eidolon	
1996	Tim Richards	"Our Swimmer"	Allen & Unwin (Letters to Francesca)	
1997	Lucy Sussex*	"Merlusine"	Roc (The Horns of Elfland)	
1997	Chris Gregory	"Jackie Chan"	Penguin (Twins)	
1997	Le Hang	"The River of Dreams"	Anchor (Influence: Australian Voices)	
1997	Jodie Kewley	"Nicholas Afalling"	Eidolon	
1997	Janeen Webb	"Death at the Blue Elephant"	HarperCollins (Enter: HQ/Flamingo Short Story Collection)	
1998	Stephen Dedman*	"A Walk-On Part in the War"	Voyager (Dreaming Down-Under)	
1998	Kerry Greenwood	"Jetsam"	Voyager (Dreaming Down-Under)	
1998	Sean McMullen	"Queen of Soulmates"	Voyager (Dreaming Down-Under)	
1998	Jane Routley	"To Avalon"	Voyager (Dreaming Down-Under)	
1998	Keith Taylor	"The Bath-house"	Moonstone (Fantastic Worlds)	
1999	Trudi Canavan*	"Whispers of the Mist Children"	Aurealis	
1999	Adam Browne	"Orlando's Third Trance"	HQ Magazine	
1999	Lisa Jacobson	"The Language of Trees"	HQ Magazine	
1999	Lucy Sussex	"The Queen of Erewhon"	F&SF	
1999	Janeen Webb	"Incident on Wolfe Street"	HQ Magazine	
2000	Geoffrey Maloney*	"The World According to Kipling (A Plain Tale from the Hills)"	Aurealis	
2000	Louise Cusack	"Goddess and the Geek"	Voyager (Mystery, Magic, Voodoo & The Holy Grail)	
2000	Chris Kenworthy	"The Fruits of Habit"	Altair	
2000	Margo Lanagan	"The Boy Who Didn't Yearn"	Allen & Unwin (White Time)	
2000	Kaaron Warren	"The Left Behind"	Orb	
2001	Sue Isle*	"The Woman of Endor"	Orb	
2001	Jack Dann	"The Diamond Pit"	Voyager (Jubilee)	
2001	Terry Dowling	"The Lagan Fishers"	Sci Fiction	
2001	Matthew Farrer	"Tales from the True Desert"	CSFG Publishing (Nor of Human...)	
2001	Kaaron Warren	"The Speaker of Heaven"	Orb	
2002	No award given	—	—	
2003	Lucy Sussex*	"La Sentinelle"	Sandglass Enterprises (Southern Blood: New Australian Tales of the Supernatural)	
2003	Lily Chrywenstrom	"Tireki and the Wind"	Fables and Reflections	
2003	Marianne de Pierres	"In the Bookshadow"	Dreamhaven Books (Shelf Life: Fantastic Stories Celebrating Bookstores)	
2003	Garth Nix	"Hope Chest"	Penguin Books (Firebirds)	
2004	Richard Harland*	"Catabolic Magic"	Aurealis	
2004	Louise Katz*	"Weavers of the Twilight"	Agog! (Agog! Smashing Stories)	
2004	Lee Battersby	"Tales of Nireym"	Orb	
2004	K. J. Bishop	"Alsiso"	Elastic Press (The Alsisio Project)	
2004	Paul Haines	"The Gift of Hindsight"	Aurealis	
2005	Richard Harland*	"The Greater Death of Saito Saku"	Agog! (Daikaiju! Giant Monster Tales)	
2005	Rosaleen Love*	"Once Giants Roamed the Earth"	Aqueduct Press (The Traveling Tide); Agog! (Daikaiju! Giant Monster Tales)	
2005	Adam Browne	"Heart of Saturday Night"	Lenox Avenue Ezine	
2005	Terry Dartnall	"Ones and Zeros"	Neverary	
2005	Dirk Flinthart	"The Red Priest's Homecoming"	Andromeda Spaceways Inflight Magazine	
2006	Margo Lanagan*	"A Fine Magic"	Eidolon Books (Eidolon I)	
2006	Lee Battersby	"Dark Ages"	Prime Books (Through Soft Air)	
2006	Stephanie Campisi	"Why the Balloon Man Floats Away"	Fantasy Magazine	
2006	Lucy Sussex	"The Revenant"	Eidolon Books (Eidolon I)	
2006	Anna Tambour	"See Here, See There"	Agog! (Agog! Ripping Reads)	
2007	Garth Nix*	"Sir Hereward and Mister Fitz Go to War Again"	Jim Baen's Universe	
2007	R. J. Astruc	"The Perfume Eater"	Strange Horizons	
2007	Adam Browne	"An Account of an Experiment by Adam Browne"	Orb	
2007	Angela Slatter	"The Angel Wood"	Shimmer	
2007	Cat Sparks	"A Lady of Adestan"	Orb	
2008	Cat Sparks*	"Sammarynda Deep"	Senses Five Press (Paper Cities: An Anthology of Urban Fantasy)	
2008	Thoraiya Dyer	"Night Heron's Curse"	Andromeda Spaceways Inflight Magazine	
2008	Karen Maric	"The Last Deflowerer"	Andromeda Spaceways Inflight Magazine	
2008	Angela Slatter	"Dresses, Three"	Shimmer	
2008	Kim Westwood	"Nightship"	HarperVoyager (Dreaming Again)	
2009	Christopher Green*	"Father's Kill"	Beneath Ceaseless Skies	
2009	Ian McHugh*	"Once a Month, On a Sunday"	Andromeda Spaceways Inflight Magazine	
2009	Tansy Rayner Roberts	"Siren Beat"	Twelfth Planet Press (Roadkill/Siren Beat)	
2009	Angela Slatter	"Words"	The Lifted Brow	
2009	Lucy Sussex	"Something Better than Death"	Aurealis	
2010	Thoraiya Dyer* (tie)	"Yowie"	Twelfth Planet Press (Sprawl)	
2010	L. L. Hannett and Angela Slatter* (tie)	"The February Dragon"	Ticonderoga Publications (Scary Kisses)	
2010	Elizabeth Carroll	"The Duke of Vertumn's Fingerling"	Strange Horizons	
2010	Andrew McKiernan	"All the Clowns in Clowntown"	Brimstone Press (Macabre: A Journey Through Australia's Darkest Fears)	
2010	Angela Slatter	"Sister, Sister"	Tartarus Press (Strange Tales III)	
2011	Thoraiya Dyer*	"Fruit of the Pipal Tree"	FableCroft Publishing (After the Rain)	
2011	Margo Lanagan	"The Proving of Smollett Standforth"	HarperVoyager (Ghosts by Gaslight)	
2011	Margo Lanagan	"Into the Clouds on High"	Allen & Unwin (Yellowcake)	
2011	Anthony Panegyres	"Reading Coffee"	Overland	
2011	D. C. White	"The Dark Night of Anton Weiss"	Ticonderoga Publications (More Scary Kisses)	
2012	Margo Lanagan*	"Bajazzle"	Twelfth Planet Press (Cracklescape)	
2012	Joanne Anderton	"Sanaa's Army"	Ticonderoga Publications (Bloodstones)	
2012	Isobelle Carmody	"The Stone Witch"	Random House (Under My Hat)	
2012	Deborah Kalin	"First They Came"	Andromeda Spaceways Inflight Magazine 55	
2012	Margo Lanagan	"The Isles of the Sun"	Twelfth Planet Press (Cracklescape)	
2013	Jay Kristoff*	"The Last Stormdancer"	Thomas Dunne Books	
2013	Tracie McBride	"The Touch of the Taniwha"	Dagan Books (Fish)	
2013	Ian McHugh	"Cold, Cold War"	Scott H. Andrews (Beneath Ceaseless Skies)	
2013	Kirstie Olley	"Short Circuit"	Oomph (Oomph: a little super goes a long way)	
2013	Kim Wilkins	"The Year of Ancient Ghosts"	Ticonderoga Publications (The Year of Ancient Ghosts)	
2014	Angela Slatter*	"St Dymphna's School for Poison Girls"	Review of Australian Fiction, Volume 9, Issue 3	
2014	Thoraiya Dyer	"The Oud"	Crossed Genres Publications (Long Hidden)	
2014	Deborah Kalin	"Teratogen"	Cemetery Dance 71	
2014	Charlotte Nash	"The Ghost of Hepaestus"	FableCroft Publishing (Cranky Ladies of History)	
2014	Angela Slatter	"The Badger Bride"	Tartarus Press (Strange Tales IV)	
2015	Rowena Cory Daniells*	"The Giant's Lady"	Newcon Press (Legends 2)	
2015	Michelle Goldsmith	"The Jellyfish Collector"	Review of Australian Fiction, Vol. 13, Issue 6	
2015	Lisa L. Hannett	"A Shot of Salt Water"	TDM Press (The Dark)	
2015	D. K. Mok	"Almost Days"	FableCroft Publishing (Insert Title Here)	
2015	Faith Mudge	"Blueblood"	Ticonderoga Publications (Hear Me Roar)	
2015	Suzanne J. Willis	"Husk and Sheaf"	SQ Mag #22	
2016	Thoraiya Dyer*	"Where the Pelican Builds Her Nest"	FableCroft Publishing (In Your Face)	
2016	Tamlyn Dreaver	"Watercress Soup"	Andromeda Spaceways Magazine #65	
2016	Jack Nicholls	"Dune Time"	Tor.com	
2016	Garth Nix	"Penny for a Match, Mister?"	Saga Press (The Starlit Wood: New Fairy Tales)	
2016	David Versace	"The Lighthouse at Cape Defeat"	Aurealis #89	
2016	Suzanne J. Willis	"The Cartographer's Price"	Mythic Delirium #3.1	
2017	Tansy Rayner Roberts*	"The Curse Is Come Upon Me, Cried"	self-published (Please Look After This Angel & Other Winged Stories)	
2017	Freya Marske	"Hamelin's Graves"	Andromeda Spaceways Magazine #69	
2017	Angela Slatter	"The Little Mermaid, in Passing"	Review of Australian Fiction, Volume 22, Issue 1	
2017	J. Ashley Smith	"Duplicity"	coeur de lion (Dimension6 #11)	
2017	Marlee Jane Ward	"The Rainmaker Goddess, Hallowed Shaz"	Feminartsy	
2017	Lili Wilkinson	"Oona Underground"	HarperCollins Publishers (Begin, End, Begin: A #LoveOzYA Anthology)	
2018	J. Ashley Smith*	"The Further Shore"	Bourbon Penn #15	
2018	Alan Baxter	"Crying Demon"	Grey Matter Press (Suspended in Dusk 2)	
2018	Juliet Marillier	"Army Men"	Lancelot Schaubert (Of Gods and Globes)	
2018	Amanda J. Spedding	"Child of the Emptyness"	Grimdark Magazine #17	
2018	David Versace	"A Moment's Peace"	CSFG Publishing (A Hand of Knaves)	
2018	Suzanne J. Willis	"Heartwood, Sapwood, Spring"	Ate Bit Bear (Sword and Sonnet)	
2019	Tansy Rayner Roberts*	"Dragon by Subscription"	(self-published on Patreon)	
2019	Joanne Anderton	"Loose Stones"	Brio Books (Infinite Threads)	
2019	Aidan Doyle	"1078 Reasons"	Translunar Travelers Lounge	
2019	Aiki Flinthart	"Pigshit and Gold"	Dimension6 #18	
2019	Ephiny Gale Teare	"CurioQueens"	Constellary Tales Magazine #4	
2019	Juliet Marillier	"Good Dog, Alice"	Titan Books (Wonderland)	
2020	Louise Pieper*	"Truth Be Told"	Unnatural Order	
2020	Nikky Lee	"The Dead May Dance"	Midnight Echo 15	
2020	Garth Nix	"The Case of the Somewhat Mythic Sword"	Tor.com	
2020	J. Z. Ting	"Terracotta Daughter"	Coppice & Brake	
2020	Suzanne J. Willis	"A Solace of Shadows"	Three Crows Magazine #7	
2021	E. J. Delaney*	"So-called Bin Chicken"	Curiouser Magazine #2	
2021	Jane Brown	"Who Wants to Be a Reaper"	The Centropic Oracle	
2021	Laura J. Fitzwilson	"All my Tuesdays"	Cicerone Journal Issue 5: Curious Worlds	
2021	Aiki Flinthart	"Old Souls"	Relics, Wrecks & Ruin, CAT Press	
2021	Tania Fordwalker	"The Woods Echo Back"	Beneath Ceaseless Skies #331	
2021	Alexander Gibbs	"Frabjous"	Cicerone Journal Issue 5: Curious Worlds	
2022	Aiki Flinthart*	"The Icecutter's Daughter	The Art of Being Human, FableCroft Publishing	
2022	Tania Fordwalker	"Ashes"	Aurealis #151	
2022	Kiera Lesley	"Tastes like Home"	Andromeda Spaceways Magazine #86	
2022	Tansy Rayner Roberts	"Salon Faerie"	(self-published)	
2022	Steve Simpson	"Beautiful Horizon"	The Purpose of Reality: Solar, Meerkat Press	
2022	Matt Tighe	"The Past Laid Out on the Table"	Cast of Wonders #506	
2023	Tansy Rayner Roberts*	"12 Days of Witchmas"	Patreon, self-published	
2023	Mikhaeyla Kopievsky	"Sea Mist, Shore Witch"	Where the Weird Things Are Vol 2, Deadset Press	
2023	Nikky Lee	"What Bones These Tides Bring"	Remains to Be Told: Dark Tales of Aotearoa, Clan Destine Press	
2023	Juliet Marillier	"These Reeds Remember"	The Other Side of Never, Titan Books	
2023	Chuck McKenzie	"The Dark Man, by Referral"	This Fresh Hell, Clan Destine Press	
2023	Garth Nix	"The Unexpected Excursion of the Murder Mystery Writing Witches"	The Book of Witches, HarperVoyager	
2024	Matt Tighe*	"Market of Loss"	Aurealis #176	
2024	J. Ashley-Smith	"The Beautiful Thing You Once Were"	Bourbon Penn #33	
2024	Eliza Baker	"Lacebound"	Aurealis #170	
2024	Emmi Khor	"Remembering the Hungry Ghosts"	Best Australian Yarn 2024, The West Australian	
2024	Tansy Rayner Roberts	"Bonnets at Dawn"	self-published	
2024	Kell Woods	"Before the Forest"	Reactor Magazine	
2025	Baden M. Chant	"Dying Mountain"	Aurealis #177	
2025	Baden M. Chant	"Dragon Drops"	Deadly Flames, Bayonet Books	
2025	Jeff Clulow	"The Hidden"	The Leper's Garden and Other Contagions, Third Eye Press	
2025	Brendan Cottam	"What We Sew"	Memento Mori, Jacaranda	
2025	Nike Sulway	"Sparrow & Butler"	Fractured Reveries: A Storied Imaginarium Salon, Storied Imaginarium Books	
2025	Matt Tighe	"Jericho and the Cursed Forest"	Drowning in the Dark and Other Stories, IFWG	

== Honourable mentions and high commendations ==
The honourable mentions and high commendations are announced alongside the list of finalists for their respected year of eligibility. In the following table, the years correspond to the year of the book's eligibility; the ceremonies are always held the following year. Each year links to the corresponding "year in literature" article. Entries with a grey background have been noted as highly commended; those with a white background have received honourable mentions. If the short story was originally published in a book with other stories rather than by itself or in a magazine, the book title is included after the publisher's name.

* Highly commended
* Honourable mentions

Year	Author	Short story	Publisher or publication	Ref
2003	Brendan Duffy	"Louder Echo"	Agog! (Agog! Terrific Tales)	
2003	Tracey Rolfe	"Storm in a Chandelier"	Agog! (Agog! Terrific Tales)	
2004	Trudi Canavan*	"A Room for Improvement"	Wakefield Press (Forever Shores)	
2006	Lily Chrywenstrom	"Ghosts of 1930"	Borderlands	
2006	Carol Ryles	"The Bridal Bier"	Eidolon Books (Eidolon I)	

== See also ==
- Ditmar Award, an Australian science fiction award established in 1969
