= The Greater Death of Saito Saku =

- Short story by Richard Harland
- Country: Australia
- Language: English
- Genre: Fantasy short story

Publication
- Published in: Daikaiju! Giant Monster Tales
- Publication type: Anthology
- Publisher: Agog! Press
- Media type: Print (hardback)
- Publication date: 2005

"The Greater Death of Saito Saku" is a 2005 fantasy short story by Richard Harland.

== Background ==
"The Greater Death of Saito Saku" was first published in 2005 in Daikaiju! Giant Monster Tales, edited by Robin Pen and Robert Hood and published by Agog! Press. It was published alongside 27 other stories by 26 authors. "The Greater Death of Saito Saku" was a joint-winner for the 2005 Aurealis Award for best fantasy short story along with Rosaleen Love's "Once Giants Roamed the Earth" which was also published in the same anthology.
