= La Sentinelle (novelette) =

- Short story by Lucy Sussex
- Country: Australia
- Language: English
- Genre: Fantasy novelette

Publication
- Published in: Southern Blood: New Australian Tales of the Supernatural
- Publication type: Anthology
- Publisher: Sandglass Enterprises
- Media type: Print (Paperback)
- Publication date: 2003

"La Sentinelle" is a 2003 fantasy novelette by Lucy Sussex.

== Background ==
"La Sentinelle" was first published in 2003 in Southern Blood: New Australian Tales of the Supernatural, edited by Bill Congreve and published by Sandglass Enterprises. It was published alongside 15 other stories by the authors Simon Brown, Kirstyn McDermott, David Carroll, Naomi Hatchman, Bill Congreve, Deborah Biancotti, Stephen Dedman, Rosaleen Love, Rick Kennett, Sean Williams, Sue Isle, George Ivanoff, Robert Hood, Terry Dowling, and Geoffrey Maloney. In 2005 it was republished in A Tour Guide in Utopia edited by Lucy Sussex and published by MirrorDanse Books. "La Sentinelle" won the 2003 Aurealis Award for best fantasy short story and the 2004 Ditmar Award for best Australian novella or novelette. It was also a finalist at the 2004 International Horror Guild Awards for best medium fiction but lost to Glen Hirshberg's "Dancing Men".
