= Once Giants Roamed the Earth =

Short story by Rosaleen Love

- Short story by Rosaleen Love
- Country: Australia
- Language: English
- Genre: Fantasy short story

Publication
- Published in: Daikaiju! Giant Monster Tales; The Traveling Tide
- Publication type: Anthology
- Publisher: Agog! Press; Aqueduct Press
- Media type: Print (hardback & paperback)
- Publication date: 2005

"Once Giants Roamed the Earth" is a 2005 fantasy short story by Rosaleen Love.

== Background ==
"Once Giants Roamed the Earth" was first published in 2005 in the anthology Daikaiju! Giant Monster Tales and the collection The Traveling Tide. Daikaiju! Giant Monster Tales was edited by Robin Pen and Robert Hood and published by Agog! Press. The Traveling Tide is a collection of stories by Rosaleen Love and was first published in May 2005 by Aqueduct Press. In 2006 it was republished in The Year's Best Australian Science Fiction & Fantasy: Volume Two, edited by Bill Congreve and Michelle Marquardt and published by MirrorDanse Books. "Once Giants Roamed the Earth" was a joint winner for the 2005 Aurealis Award for best fantasy short story along with Richard Harland's "The Greater Death of Saito Saku". It was also a short-list nominee for the 2006 Ditmar Award for best short story but lost to Kaaron Warren's "Fresh Young Widow".
