= Merlusine =

- Short story by Lucy Sussex
- Country: Australia
- Language: English
- Genre(s): Fantasy, science fiction, novelette

Publication
- Published in: The Horns of Elfland
- Publication type: Anthology
- Publisher: Roc Books
- Media type: Print (Paperback)
- Publication date: 1997

"Merlusine" is a 1997 fantasy and science fiction novelette by Lucy Sussex.

== Background ==
"Merlusine" was first published in Australia in 1997 in The Horns of Elfland anthology by Roc Books alongside 14 other stories by various authors.

"Merlusine" won the 1997 Aurealis Award for best fantasy short story and was a short-list nominee for the best science fiction short story but lost to "Niagara Falling" by Janeen Webb and Jack Dann.

In 2005 it was republished in A Tour Guide in Utopia edited by Lucy Sussex and published by MirrorDanse Books.
