= Sir Hereward and Mister Fitz Go to War Again =

2007 novelette by Garth Nix

- Short story by Garth Nix
- Country: Australia
- Language: English
- Genre: Fantasy novelette

Publication
- Published in: Jim Baen's Universe April 2007
- Publication type: Periodical
- Publisher: Baen Publishing
- Media type: Print (magazine)
- Publication date: 2007

"Sir Hereward and Mister Fitz Go to War Again" is a 2007 fantasy novelette by Garth Nix.

== Background ==
"Sir Hereward and Mister Fitz Go to War Again" was first published in the April 2007 edition of Jim Baen's Universe, edited by Mike Resnick and Eric Flint and published by Baen Publishing.

In 2008 it was republished in Fantasy: The Best of the Year: 2008 Edition edited by Rich Horton, Year's Best Fantasy 8 edited by David G. Hartwell and Kathryn Cramer, The Best of Jim Baen's Universe II edited by Eric Flint and Mike Resnick, and in The Year's Best Fantasy and Horror 2008: Twenty-First Annual Collection edited by Kelly Link, Gavin J. Grant, Ellen Datlow.

In 2008 Nix wrote a sequel to the story, "Beyond the Sea Gate of the Scholar-Pirates of Sarsköe". This was followed by a number of other stories featuring the same characters.

== Awards ==
"Sir Hereward and Mister Fitz Go to War Again" won the 2007 Aurealis Award for best fantasy short story and was a short-list nominee for the 2008 Ditmar Award for best novella but lost to Cat Sparks' "A Lady of Adestan".
