= Thoraiya Dyer =

Australian writer of fantasy, speculative and science fiction

Thoraiya Dyer is an Australian writer of fantasy, speculative and science fiction. As of June 2024, she has won five Aurealis Awards and four Ditmar Awards, each of the latter in different categories.

== Career ==
Dyer trained and worked as a veterinarian before publishing her first fantasy short stories in 2008. Her work has appeared in Analog Science Fiction and Fact, Apex Magazine, Clarkesworld Magazine, Cosmos and Redstone Science Fiction and well as a number of anthologies.

Dyer was joint winner of the 2010 Aurealis Award for Best Fantasy Short Story for "Yowie", winning that award again in 2011 for "Fruit of the Pipal Tree" and in 2016 for "Where the Pelican Builds Her Next". In 2012 she won the Aurealis Award for Best Young Adult Short Story for "The Wisdom of the Ants", which also won the Ditmar Best Short Story in 2013. She was awarded the Aurealis Award for Best Science Fiction Short Story in 2014 for "Wine, Women, and Stars".

She won the Ditmar Award for Best New Talent in 2011, having been shortlisted for that award the previous year. Also in 2011, she won the Ditmar Award for Best Novella or Novelette for The Company Articles of Edward Teach.

Her 2017 fantasy novel, Crossroads of Canopy, won the 2018 Ditmar Award for Best Novel. It was described in Kirkus Reviews as "an epic fantasy that builds an intriguing setting but never quite comes into focus". In reviewing Dyer's second novel, Echoes of Understorey, Katharine Coldiron wrote that it was "a satisfying read, and a delirious second dive into a complete, absorbing fantasy universe".

== Selected works ==
- Titan's Forest Trilogy
  - Crossroads of Canopy (2017)
  - Echoes of Understorey (2018)
  - Tides of the Titans (2019)
- Victory Citrus Is Sweet (ebook)(2022)
