= Nathan Burrage =

Australian writer of speculative fiction

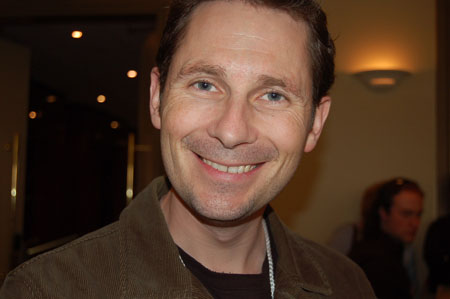
- Nathan Burrage in 2007
- Born: 7 January 1971 (age 55); Victoria, Australia
- Occupations: Author; Program Manager
- Writing career
- Period: 2001 to present
- Genre: Speculative fiction
- Website: www.nathanburrage.com

Nathan Burrage is an Australian writer of speculative fiction.

Born 1971, in country Victoria, Australia, Burrage grew up in Melbourne. He graduated with a Bachelor of Economics & Commerce from the University of Melbourne in 1993.

He began writing fiction in the late 1990s, with his first short story was published in 2001. In that year Burrage was awarded a mentorship by the NSW Writers’ Centre to develop an early version of his debut novel, FIVEFOLD. Since then, he has had 20 short stories published in various Australian anthologies, magazines and webzines.

In January 2005, Burrage was selected to attend Clarion South, the Australian equivalent of the US residential short story workshop. With the benefit of this experience, he was able to secure a literary agent and FIVEFOLD was sold to Random House Australia in January 2007.

== Bibliography – novels ==
- FIVEFOLD - ISBN 978-1-86325-585-1 published in January 2008 by / Random House Australia

== Bibliography – short stories (selected) ==
- 2010 - R Quotient (reprint) & In the Arms of Medusa (reprint) - Issue 8, / Orb Speculative Fiction
- 2010 - Fragments of the Fractured Forever - Issue 43, / Aurealis Magazine
- 2008 - Spirals in the Sky - Issue 40, / Aurealis Magazine
- 2008 - Obituary Park - Macabre: A Journey Through Australia's Darkest Fears, / Brimstone Press
- 2008 - 7 Kinds of Wrong - Black Box e-anthology, / Brimstone Press
- 2008 - Upon Reflection - Black Box e-anthology, / Brimstone Press
- 2007 - The Sidpa Bardo (reprint) - Australian Dark Fantasy & Horror 2, / Brimstone Press
- 2007 - The 32 Paths - Issue 114, / AntipodeanSF
- 2007 - Black & Bitter, Thanks - / Ticonderoga Publications, The Workers' Paradise Anthology
- 2007 - In The Arms of Medusa - Issue 7, / Orb Magazine (nominated for a 2007 Aurealis Award).
- 2006 - A Skinful of Guilt - Issue 11, / Shadowed Realms
- 2006 - The Sidpa Bardo - Issue 10, / Shadowed Realms
- 2005 - Blurring - Shadow Box e-anthology, / Brimstone Press
- 2004 - The R Quotient - Issue 6, / Orb Magazine
- 2001 - A Message to Medicare - Issue 7, / Redsine Magazine
- 2001 - Snowstorm - Issue 27/28, / Aurealis Magazine

== Awards and nominations ==
- 2009 Ditmar Awards, Fivefold, short-listed for Best Novel
- 2009 Aurealis Awards, "Black and Bitter, Thanks", short-listed for Best Science Fiction story
- 2008 Ditmar Awards, short-listed for Best New Talent
