= Shades series =

Shades
- First editions
- Shadow Dance; Night Beast; Ancient Light; Black Sun Rising
- Author: Rob Hood
- Country: Australia
- Language: English
- Genre: Horror
- Publisher: Hodder Headline
- Published: 2001
- Media type: Print
- No. of books: 4

The Shades series is a series of young adult horror novels written by Australian horror writer Rob Hood. The four-volume series (Hodder Headline) includes: Shadow Dance, Night Beast, Ancient Light and Black Sun Rising.

Drawing on the mythology of ancient Egypt, the Knights Templar and more, Hood created a series about Shadow creatures waging an anti-human war.
