= Daydreaming on Company Time =

Short story collection by Australian horror author Rob Hood

- First edition (publ. Five Islands Press)
- Author: Rob Hood
- Language: English
- Genre: Short story collection
- Publisher: Five Islands Press
- Publication date: 1988
- Publication place: Australia
- Media type: Print
- Pages: 98 pp.
- ISBN: 0958797226

Daydreaming on Company Time was the first collection of stories by Australian horror writer Rob Hood. It was published in 1988 by Five Islands Press.

== Contents ==
The volume contains 12 stories and includes fantasy tales like the title story and crime tales as well as horror tales of dislocated psyches, all told with a quirky black sense of humour. It includes the powerful "Juggernaut"(about an inexplicable and destructive Object), as well as strong horror tales like "Last Remains", and "Necropolis".

== Awards ==
The book was runner-up for Best Single Author Collection in the 1990 Readercon Imaginative Fiction Awards (USA).
