= Catriona Sparks =

Australian writer

Catriona "Cat" Sparks
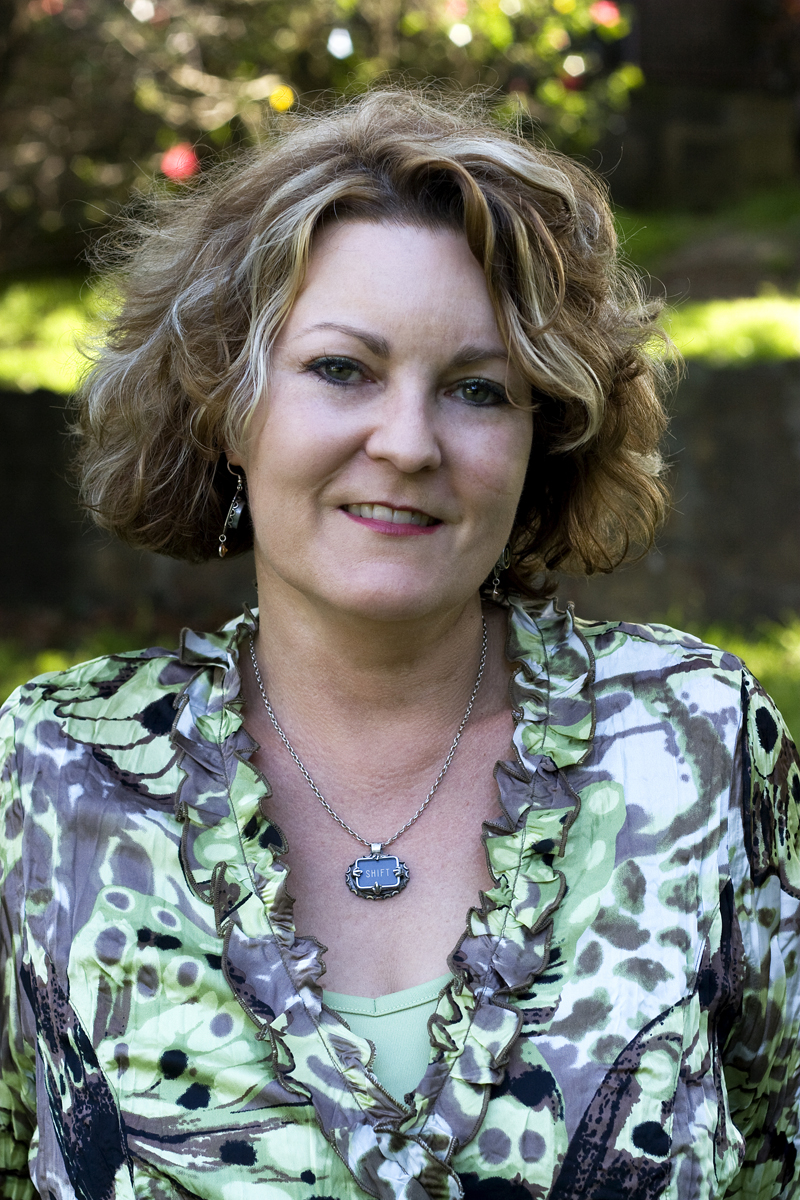
- Born: 11 September 1965 (age 61)
- Writing career
- Genre: Speculative fiction
- Website: www.catsparks.net

Catriona "Cat" Sparks (born 11 September 1965, Sydney, New South Wales) is an Australian science fiction writer, editor and publisher.

== Publishing ==
As manager and editor of Agog! Press with her partner, Australian horror writer Rob Hood, Sparks has produced ten anthologies of speculative fiction.

== Writing ==
She has won thirteen Ditmar Awards for writing, editing and artwork, her most recent in 2014, when her short story Scarp was awarded a Ditmar for Best Short Story and 'The Bride Price' one for Best Collected Work. She was nominated for the Aurealis Peter McNamara Convenors' Award for Excellence in 2003 and won one in 2004 for services to the Australian SF publishing industry. In 2006 Sparks was convenor of the Horror judging panel of the Aurealis Awards, and in 2008 she was Guest of Honour at the Conflux 5 Science Fiction Convention in Canberra.

Sparks has concentrated on her writing in recent years. In 2004 Sparks graduated the inaugural Clarion South Writers' Workshop in Queensland and won third prize in the first quarter of the Writers of the Future competition. Her short fiction has been nominated for the Aurealis Awards in 2004, 2005, 2007 and 2008. Her short story Hollywood Roadkill won both the Aurealis Award for Best Science Fiction Short Story and the Golden Aurealis Award in the 2007 Aurealis Awards. Her short story Seventeen won the Aurealis Award for Best Science young Adult Short Story in the 2009 Aurealis Awards.

In 2010 Sparks replaced Damien Broderick as fiction editor of Cosmos magazine Cosmos Magazine ceased publication of short fiction in 2016.

In January 2012 she was one of 12 students chosen to participate in Margaret Atwood’s The Time Machine Doorway workshop as part of the Key West Literary Seminar Yet Another World: literature of the future. Her participation was funded by an Australia Council emerging writers grant.

In 2012 she became a provisional candidate for a Doctorate of Philosophy – Media, Culture and Creative Arts through Curtin University.

Her 2013 collection The Bride Price won the Ditmar Award for Best Collection.

She is an active member of Science Fiction Writers of America.

Her debut novel, Lotus Blue, was published by Talos Press in February 2017. Lotus Blue has been described as "Mad Max meets Terminator meets Ghost in the Shell".

== Bibliography ==
=== Novels ===
Sparks, Cat (2017). Lotus Blue. New York, NY: Talos Press.

=== Short fiction ===
==== Collections ====
Sparks, Cat (2020). Dark Harvest. UK: Newcon Press.
Sparks, Cat (2013). The Bride Price. Introduction by Sean Williams. Greenwood, W.A.: Ticonderoga Publications.

==== Short stories ====
- Hacking Santorini (2020), Dark Harvest, Newcon Press
- Before Dominica (2019), Kaleidotrope
- You Will Remember Who You Were (2019), Dimension6, ed. Keith Stevenson, April 2019, Coeur de Lion Publishing. Shortlisted for an Aurealis Award.
- And the Ship Sails On (2018), Aurum: A Golden Anthology of Original Australian Fantasy, ed. Russell B Farr, Ticonderoga Publications
- Cassini Falling (2018), Continuum 14: Conjugation program book, reprinted in AntipodeanSF 250
- Fata Morgana (2018), Mother of Invention, eds Rivqa Rafael & Tansy Rayner Roberts, Twelfth Planet Press
- War is Very Popular These Days (2017), Luminescent Threads – Connections to Octavia Butler, Twelfth Planet Press
- Move over Sci Fi – Here Comes Climate Fiction (2017), The Daily Beast
- Beaming in From SXSW (2017), Cosmos Magazine
- The One Book That Shook My Faith in Nature & Humanity (2017), Tor.com
- Cat Sparks talks ‘Lotus Blue’ and a new genre in Cli Fi (2017), Hypable
- The Big Idea (2017), Whatever
- 13 Horrible Apocalypses That Will Make You Question Your Faith in Humankind (2017), Electric Literature
- Climate science and climate fiction – where data intersects with art (2017), Boing Boing
- Prayers to Broken Stone (2017), Kaleidotrope, Spring issue
- Dragon Girl (2016), The Year’s Best Fantasy and Horror, Ed. Liz Gryzb and Talie Helene, Ticonderoga Publications (reprint)
- Jericho Blush (2016), Cyclopean, Issue #2, Ed. Chase Capener, Cyclopean Press
- No Fat Chicks (2016), In Your Face, ed. Tehani Wessely, Fablecroft Press
- The Seventh Relic (2015), Focus 2014: highlights of Australian short fiction, ed. Tehani Wessely, Fablecroft Press (reprint)
- New Chronicles of Andras Thorn (2015), The Year’s Best Fantasy and Horror, Ed. Liz Grzyb and Talie Helene, Ticonderoga Publications (reprint)
- Hot Rods (2015), Loosed Upon the World, Saga Press, ed. John Joseph Adams (reprint)
- Veterans Day (2015), Hear Me Roar, Ed. Liz Grzyb, Ticonderoga Publications
- Dragon Girl (2015), The Never Never Land, CSFG Publishing
- Hot Rods (2015), Lightspeed Magazine, ed. John Joseph Adams
- Street of the Dead (2015). You’re Not Alone, ed. Damien Broderick (reprint)
- New Chronicles of Andras Thorn (2014), Dimension 6, ed. Keith Stevenson, Coeur de Lion Publishing
- The Seventh Relic (2014), Phantazein, ed. Tehani Wessely, Fablecroft Publishing (winner of 2014 Best Short Story Ditmar)
- Dark Harvest (2014), Solaris Rising 3, ed. Ian Whates, Solaris
- Chinaman’s Bluff (2013).
- Scarp", In The Bride Price (2013). Ticonderoga Publications
- Beyond the Farthest Stone (2013). In The Bride Price, Ticonderoga Publications
- Daughters of Battendown (2013). In One Small Step, ed. Tehani Wessely, Fablecroft Publishing
- The Alabaster Child (2011). In Gutshot: Weird West Tales, ed. Conrad Williams, PS Publishing - Anthology nominated for a British Fantasy Award
- The Sleeping and the Dead (2011). In Ishtar, Morrigan Books - Nominated for a DITMAR Award
- Dead Low' (2011). In Midnight Echo #6, The Australian Horror Writers Association - Nominated for an Aurealis Award
- Beautiful (2011). In Anywhere But Earth, Coeur de Lion Publishing
- All the Love in the World (2010). In Sprawl, ed. Alisa Krasnostein, Twelfth Planet Press
- The Piano Song (2010). In Scenes from the Second Storey, eds. Amanda Pillar and Pete Kempshaw, Morrigan Books
- Heart of Stone (2009). In X6, ed. Keith Stevenson, Coeur de Lion Publishing
- The Snow Leopard (2009), Borderlands Magazine, #11
- Seventeen (2009), In. Masques, ed. Gillian Polack, Canberra Speculative Fiction Guild. Awarded Best Young Adult Short Story in the 2009 Aurealis Awards
- Piper (2008), Andromeda Spaceways Inflight Magazine, #36.
- Palisade (2008). In Clockwork Phoenix: Tales of Beauty and Strangeness, ed. Mike Allen, Norilana Books
- Shadows of Our Gods (2008), Borderlands Magazine, #10.
- Sammarynda Deep (2008). In Paper Cities: An Anthology of Urban Fantasy, ed. Ekaterina Sedia, Senses Five Press. Awarded Best Fantasy Short Story in the 2008 Aurealis Awards. Reprinted in Award Winning Australian Writing 2009, Melbourne Books
- A Million Shades of Nightmare (2007), Dark Animus, #10. Recorded as a podcast for Outlandish Voices in 2009
- Hollywood Roadkill (2007), On Spec, #69. Awarded both Best Science Fiction Short Story and the Short Story Golden Aurealis in the 2007 Aurealis Awards
- Right to Work (2007). In Workers Paradise, eds. Russell B. Farr and Nick Evans, Ticonderoga Publications.
- Champagne and Ice (2007), Aurealis.
- A Lady of Adestan (2007), Orb, # 7, June. Nominated for Best Fantasy Short Story in the 2007 Aurealis Awards
- The Bride Price (2007), New Ceres, #2, 2007
- Arctica (2007). In Fantastic Wonder Stories, ed. Russell B. Farr, Ticonderoga Publications. Nominated for Best Science Fiction Short Story in the 2007 Aurealis Awards
- The Golden Hour (2006), WyR[E]d, November.
- The Jarrah Run (2006), In c0ck, eds. Andrew Macrae and Keith Stephenson, coeur de lion press.
- The Delicacy of Dragonflies (2006), Fables and Reflections, #8.
- Street of the Dead (2006), Cosmos, #9, June. Reprinted in Greek Newspaper Eleftherotypia, 2009
- Blue Stars For All Saviours' Day (2006). In The Outcast, ed. Nicole R. Murphy, Canberra Speculative Fiction Guild.
- The Ice Bride (2006), Shadowed Realms, #9, The Redback Edition.
- Message in a Bottle (2005), Borderlands, #6
- Macchiato Lane (2005), TiconderogaOnline, #5. Nominated for Best Horror Short Story in the 2005 Aurealis Awards
- Historical Perspective (2005), Simulacrum, July.
- Arcana (2005). In Mitch? 4: Slow Dancing in Quicksand.
- Home by the Sea (2004), Orb, #6. Nominated for Best Science Fiction Short Story in the 2004 Aurealis Awards. Reprinted in The Year's Best Australian Science Fiction and Fantasy, 2005, eds. Bill Congreve and Michelle Marquardt, MirrorDanse Books
- Last Dance at the Sargeant Majors' Ball (2004). Borderlands Magazine, #3, 2004. Reprinted in L Ron Hubbard presents Writers of the Future, vol XXI, 2005.
- Meltdown my Plutonium Heart (2004). In Encounters, eds. Maxine McArthur and Donna Maree Hanson, Canberra Speculative Fiction Guild.
- I am my Fathers Daughters (2003), Visions Magazine, #23.
- The Birdcage (2003). In Elsewhere, ed. Michael Barry, Canberra Speculative Fiction Guild.
- Our Lady of Spatial Anomalies (2003), Fables and Reflections, #5.
- Song of the Crescent Moon (2003), Gynaezine.
- Gracelands (2003), Dark Animus, #3.
- Roswell 14 (co-written with Max Blaxall) (2003). In Consensual 2: The Second Coming.
- Cross the Nullarbor to the Sea (2003), In Glimpses, Vision Writer's Group.
- Pod (2003). In Ideomancer Unbound, eds. Mikal Trimm and Chris Clarke, Fictionwise.
- Rats Nest (2003). In Potato Monkey, #3,
- 14 Shopping Days Till Xmas (2002), Vision Newszine.
- Birthmark (2002), Antipodean SF, #55.
- Arthur Nolan's Twilight (2002), Aurealis, #30.
- Rites of Passage (2002). In Mitch?3: Hacks to the Max.
- 100% M-Hype (2002). In Passing Strange, ed. Bill Congreve, MirrorDanse Books, 2002
- Reigning Cats and Dogs (2002), Andromeda Spaceways Inflight Magazine, #1.
- Meltdown my Plutonium Heart (2002), Borderlands Convention Program.
- Epiphany on the Wirewalk (2002), Fables and Reflections, #1.
- Hollywood Hills (2002), Antipodean SF, #45.
- Fuchsia Spins by Moonlight (2002), Redsine, #7
- Invasion of the Latte Snatchers (2001). In Mitch?2: Tarts of the New Millennium.

==== Work published in anthologies ====
- AustrAlien Absurdities (2002), ed. Chuck McKenzie and Tansy Rayner Roberts, ISBN 0-9580567-1-4
- Daikaiju! Giant Monster Tales (2005), ed. Rob Hood and Robin Pen, ISBN 0-9580567-4-9
- Daikaiju! 2: Revenge of the Giant Monsters (2007), ed. Rob Hood and Robin Pen, ISBN 978-0-8095-7231-1
- Daikaiju! 3: Giant Monster vs The World (2007), ed. Rob Hood and Robin Pen, ISBN 978-0-8095-7233-5
- Canterbury 2100: pilgrimages in a new world (2007), ed. Dirk Flinthart, ISBN 978-0-8095-7328-8

=== Anthologies edited ===
- Agog! Ripping Reads (2006), ed. Cat Sparks, ISBN 0-8095-6237-5
- Agog! Smashing Stories (2004), ed. Cat Sparks, ISBN 0-9580567-3-0
- Agog! Terrific Tales (2003), ed. Cat Sparks, ISBN 0-9580567-2-2
- Agog! Fantastic Fiction (2002), ed. Cat Sparks, ISBN 0-9580567-0-6
- The Scary Food Cookbook, a compendium of gastronomic atrocity (2008), ed. Cat Sparks, ISBN 978-0-9580567-5-5

== See also ==
- Catriona
