= Jane R. Goodall =

Australian author and academic (born 1951)

- Born: 1951 (age 74–75); Yorkshire, England
- Writing career
- Language: English
- Years active: 2003–present
- Notable work: The Walker

Jane R. Goodall (born 1951) is a researcher at the Writing and Society Research Centre of Western Sydney University, Australia.

Born in Yorkshire, England, Goodall studied at London and Oxford Universities. She is currently Emeritus Professor in the Writing and Society Research Group at University of Western Sydney.

Her research deals with the dynamics of cultural crisis. She is the author of a wide range of books and essays on literary and cultural history. She contributes regularly to the Inside Story newsletter.

Each of Goodall's novels feature the character Detective Briony Williams.

== Awards ==
- Ned Kelly Award for Crime Writing, Best First Novel, 2004: joint winner for The Walker

== Bibliography ==
=== Novels ===
- The Walker (2004)
- The Visitor (2005)
- The Calling (2007)

=== Non-fiction ===
- Artaud and the Gnostic Drama (1994), ISBN 978-0198-15186-9
- Performance and Evolution in the Age of Darwin: Out of the Natural Order (Routledge, 2002) ISBN 0-4152-4377-7
- edited with Christa Knellwolf, the collection: Frankenstein's science: experimentation and discovery in romantic culture, 1780–1830 (Ashgate, 2008), ISBN 978-0754-65447-6
- Stage Presence: The Actor as Mesmerist (Routledge, 2008) ISBN 0-4153-9594-1
- The Politics of Common Good: Dispossession in Australia (NewSouth, 2019) ISBN 978-1742-23601-8
