= The Diamond Pit =

2001 fantasy science fiction novella by Jack Dann

- Short story by Jack Dann
- Country: Australia
- Language: English
- Genres: Fantasy, science fiction

Publication
- Published in: Jubilee
- Publication type: Collection
- Publisher: Voyager
- Media type: Print (Paperback)
- Publication date: 2001

"The Diamond Pit" is a 2001 fantasy science fiction novella by American writer Jack Dann.

== Background ==
"The Diamond Pit" was first published in 2001 in a collection of Jack Dann's short stories entitled Jubilee by HarperCollins under their Voyager imprint. In June 2001 it was published in The Magazine of Fantasy & Science Fiction June 2001 edition and in 2004 it was published in The Best Australian Science Fiction: A Fifty Year Collection, edited by Rob Gerrand. "The Diamond Pit" won the 2002 Ditmar Award for best Australian short fiction and placed twelfth on the 2002 Locus Award for best novella. It was also a finalist for the 2001 Aurealis Award for best science fiction short story, the 2001 Aurealis Award for best fantasy short story, the 2001 Nebula Award for Best Novella, and the 2002 Hugo Award for Best Novella.
