= Tansy Rayner Roberts =

Australian fantasy writer (born 1978)

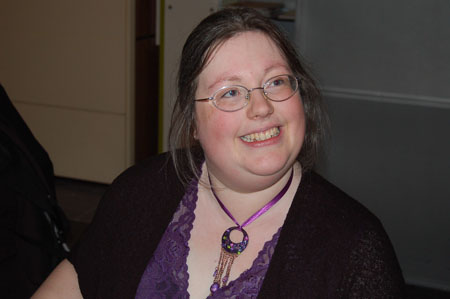
Roberts in 2007

Tansy Rayner Roberts (born 22 May 1978) is an Australian fantasy writer. Her short stories have been published in a variety of genre magazines, including Andromeda Spaceways Inflight Magazine and Aurealis. She also writes crime fiction as Livia Day.

== Biography ==
Born in Hobart, Tasmania, she holds a Bachelor of Arts (Hons), and completed a PhD in Classics in 2007, both from the University of Tasmania. She currently lives with her husband and two children in Tasmania.

== Work ==
In 1998, Roberts won the inaugural George Turner Prize for Splashdance Silver (1998, Bantam). A sequel, Liquid Gold, and the chapbook novelette Hobgoblin Boots are also both set in the comic fantasy world of 'Mocklore.' The books have subsequently been republished in ebook by FableCroft Publishing, with a third novel in the series, Ink Black Magic, also being published by FableCroft Publishing in 2013. Ink Black Magic was shortlisted for the Best Fantasy Novel category of the 2013 Australian Aurealis Awards.

In 2007 her children's novel, Seacastle, was published by ABC Books. Seacastle is the first book in the seven-part children's book series, "The Lost Shimmaron". Each book in the Lost Shimmaron series was written by a different author.

In May 2010 Power and Majesty, Book One of the "Creature Court trilogy", was published by HarperCollins Voyager. Roberts has described the "Creature Court trilogy" as a combination of two fantasy subgenres: court fantasy and urban fantasy.

Roberts was one of the founding members of Andromeda Spaceways Inflight Magazine and edited issues 9 in 2003 and issue 23 in 2006. She also co-edited AustrAlien Absurdities (Agog! Press) with Chuck McKenzie, an anthology of humorous Australian speculative fiction in 2002 and is co-editor for the forthcoming Cranky Ladies of History anthology (FableCroft Publishing).

In 2010, Roberts won the WSFA Small Press Award for her novella Siren Beat (2009, Twelfth Planet Press). Siren Beat was also nominated for the Australian Aurealis Awards for Best fantasy Short Story. Roberts won the WSFA Small Press Award again in 2012 for "The Patrician" from her short story collection Love and Romanpunk, volume 2 (2011, Twelfth Planet Press).

In 2013, Roberts was elected Overseas Director for the Science Fiction and Fantasy Writers of America (SFWA). In 2012, 2013 and 2014, Roberts was nominated for the Hugo Award for Best Fancast with Galactic Suburbia, as well as for Verity! podcast in 2014. She is a co-host on both Galactic Suburbia and Verity!. She won the Hugo Award for Best Fan Writer in 2013. In 2015 she won the Ditmar Award for Best Fan Writer.

Roberts cites writers Anne Bishop, Jacqueline Carey, Laurell K. Hamilton, Robert B. Parker, Nancy Mitford, F. Scott Fitzgerald and Ovid as influences on her writing.

== Awards ==
- 2015 Ditmar Award Best Fan Writer
- 2014 William Atheling Jr. Award (tie): Galactic Suburbia Episode 87: Saga Spoilerific Book Club (with Alisa Krasnostein & Alex Pierce)
- 2014 William Atheling Jr. Award (tie): "New Who in Conversation" series (with David McDonald & Tehani Wessely) Finalist 2014 Ditmar Award Best Short Story: "Cold White Daughter", One Small Step (FableCroft Publishing). Finalist 2014 Ditmar Award Best Fan Publication in any medium: Galactic Suburbia (with Alisa Krasnostein & Alex Pierce)
- 2013 Hugo Award for Best Fan Writer
- 2013 Ditmar Award Best Fan Writer: body of work including reviews in Not If You Were The Last Short Story on Earth
- 2013 William Atheling Jr. Award: "Historically Authentic Sexism in Fantasy. Let's Unpack That" (Tor.com)
- 2012 WSFA Small Press Award: "The Patrician", Love and Romanpunk (Twelfth Planet Press)
- 2012 Ditmar Award Best Short Story: "The Patrician", Love and Romanpunk (Twelfth Planet Press)
- 2011 Ditmar Award Best Novel: Power and Majesty (HarperVoyager)
- 2011 Ditmar Award Best Fan Publication in any medium: Galactic Suburbia podcast (with Alisa Krasnostein and Alex Pierce)
- 2011 Ditmar Award Best Achievement: Snapshot 2010 (with Alisa Krasnostein, Kathryn Linge, Rachel Holkner, Alexandra Pierce, and Tehani Wessely)
- 2011 William Athleing Jr. Award: "A Modern Woman’s Guide to Classic Who"
- 2010 WSFA Small Press Award: "Siren Beat" (Twelfth Planet Press)
- 2010 Aurealis Award for Best Fantasy Novel: Power and Majesty (HarperVoyager)
- 2008 Ditmar Award Best Fan Production: 2007 Snap Shot Project - interviews with influential members of the Australian speculative fiction scene (with Alisa Krasnostein, Ben Payne, Alexandra Pierce, Katherine Linge, Kaaron Warren & Rosie Clark)
- 2008 Ditmar Award Best Fanzine: Not If You Were the Last Short Story on Earth (with Alisa Krasnostein, Ben Payne & Alexandra Pierce)

== Published fiction ==
=== Novels and longer works ===
- Splashdance Silver (1998), Bantam
  - Reprinted in ebook in 2013 by FableCroft Publishing
- Liquid Gold (1999), Bantam
  - Reprinted in ebook in 2013 by FableCroft Publishing
- Hobgoblin Boots (2004), Scrybe Press
- Seacastle (2007), Book 1 of The Lost Shimmaron series, ABC Books
- "Siren Beat" (2010), Twelfth Planet Press
- Power and Majesty (2010), Book 1 of Creature Court, Harper Voyager
- The Shattered City (2011), Book 2 of Creature Court, Harper Voyager
- Love and Romanpunk (2011), Twelfth Planet Pres
- Reign of Beasts (2012), Book 3 of Creature Court, Harper Voyager
- Ink Black Magic (2013), FableCroft Publishing
- Musketeer Space (2014-), web serial

=== Short fiction ===
- Cookie Cutter Superhero (2014), Kaleidoscope, eds. Alisa Krasnostein & Julia Rios, Twelfth Planet Press
- Of War and Wings (2014), Clockwork Universe: Steampunk vs. Aliens, eds. Patricia Bray & Joshua Palmatier, Zombies Need Brains LLC
- The Minotaur Girls (2013), Glitter and Mayhem, eds. John Klima, Lynne M. Thomas & Michael Damian Thomas, Apex Publications
- Cold White Daughter (2013), One Small Step, ed. Tehani Wessely, FableCroft Publishing
- The Raven and her Victory (2013), Where Thy Dark Eye Glances: Queering Edgar Allan Poe, ed. Steve Berman, Lethe Press
  - Reprinted in Heiresses of Russ (2014), Lethe Press
- Please Look After This Angel (2012), Angel Story/Islandia
- What Books Survive (2012), Epilogue, ed. Tehani Wessely, FableCroft Publishing
  - Reprinted in Year's Best Fantasy and Horror 2012 (2013), Ticonceroga Publications
- Julia Agrippina’s Secret Family Bestiary (2011), Love and Romanpunk, Twelfth Planet Press
- Lamia Victoriana (2011), Love and Romanpunk, Twelfth Planet Press
- The Patrician (2011), Love and Romanpunk, Twelfth Planet Press
  - Reprinted in Year's Best Australian Fantasy and Horror 2011 (2012), Ticonderoga Publications
  - Reprinted in Apex Magazine (2013)
- Last of the Romanpunks (2011), Love and Romanpunk, Twelfth Planet Press
- Relentless Adaptations (2010), Sprawl, ed. Alisa Krasnostein, Twelfth Planet Press
- Nine Times (2010), Worlds Next Door, ed. Tehani Wessely, FableCroft Publishing
- Like Us (2009), Shiny, #5, Twelfth Planet Press
- Prosperine When it Sizzles (2009), New Ceres Nights, eds. Alisa Krasnostein & Tehani Wessely, Twelfth Planet Press
- Fleshy (2008), 2012, eds. Alisa Krasnostein & Ben Payne, Twelfth Planet Press
- The Scent of Milk (2007), Aurealis, #38/39
- The Pastimes of Aunties (2007), Fantastic Journeys to Brisbane
- The Bluebell Vengeance (2007), Andromeda Spaceways Inflight Magazine, #28
- Lucky Tart (2006), Andromeda Spaceways Inflight Magazine, #26
- Scandal at the Feast of Saturn (2006), New Ceres, #1, Twelfth Planet Press
- Rosebuds (2006), In Agog! Ripping Reads, ed. Cat Sparks, Agog! Press
- Fruit and Mirrors (2006), Aurealis, #36, Chimaera Publications
- Holding out for a Hero (2006), The Outcast, ed. Nicole R. Murphy, Canberra Speculative Fiction Guild
- Delta Void and the Stray God (2005), Andromeda Spaceways Inflight Magazine, #16
- Garments of the Dead (2004), Aurealis #32
- Memo for Flight Attendants (2003), Andromeda Spaceways Inflight Magazine, #7
- Fairy Tale Blues (2002), Potato Monkey, #2
- Somewhere Over the Looking Glass (2002), Andromeda Spaceways Inflight Magazine, #4
- Immortality Crack’d (2002), Twilight Times, #18
- Swansong (2002), Fiction Inferno, August
- Cendrillon and the Chromium Prince (2002), In Machinations: An Anthology of Ingenious Designs, ed. Chris Andrews, Canberra Speculative Fiction Guild
- Delta Void and the Clockwork Man (2002), In Agog! Fantastic Fiction, ed. Cat Sparks, Agog! Press 2002
- Fairy Godmother Express (2002), Andromeda Spaceways Inflight Magazine, #1
  - Reprinted in Eotu Ezine (November 2003)
  - Reprinted in Best of ASIM Fantasy (June 2007)
- Delta Void and the Unicorn Soup (2002), in AustrAlien Absurdities, eds. Chuck McKenzie and Tansy Rayner Roberts, Agog! Press
- Faces of the Elit (2001), Twilight Times, #14
- Black Holes (2001), Eotu Ezine, v2 #4
- Sold my soul to the devil, mum (2001), Writer's Radio, July, 5UV Adelaide
- Tasting, the Alien (2001), Writer's Radio, June, 5UV Adelaide
- Pygmalion's Flesh (2001), Antipodean Sci-Fi, #35
- Romancing the WWW (1999), Orb #0
- The Glamoured Girl (1999), Harbinger #4
- Once Upon a Literal Legend (1999), Harbinger #2
- Manipulation (1998), Under Magellanic Clouds, #4

== Published non-fiction ==
- 50 Roman Mistresses: Scandal, Virtue and Womanhood in Ancient Rome (2014), FableCroft Publishing
- Rereading the Empire trilogy (2014), Tor.com
- The Main Character in Their Own Lives: Does Diversity Make YA SF/F Better? (2013), Tor.com
- Fantasy Art, Fishnets, and Red Sonja's Chainmail Bikini () (2013), Apex Magazine, #51
- Historically Authentic Sexism in Fantasy. Let’s Unpack That. (2012), Tor.com
- The Ultimate Sixth (2012), Chicks Unravel Time: Women Journey Through Every Season of Doctor Who, eds. Deborah Stanish & L.M. Myles, Mad Norwegian Press
- The Australian Dark Weird'' (2011), Apex Magazine, #30
