= Monica McInerney =

Australian writer

- Born: 1965 (age 60–61); Clare, South Australia, Australia
- Occupation: Novelist
- Writing career
- Notable awards: 2008 Australian Book Industry Awards (ABIA) , General Fiction Book of the Year, winner

Monica McInerney is an Australian-born, Dublin-based novelist. Her books have been published worldwide and in more than a dozen languages.

== Early life and education ==
Monica McInerney grew up in a family of seven children in the Clare Valley wine region of South Australia, where her father was the railway stationmaster and her mother worked in the library. She attended St Joseph's primary school and Clare High School.

== Career ==
McInerney has previously worked as an event manager and organiser of tourism festivals, a freelance writer/editor, a record company press officer, a barmaid, grape picker and hotel cleaner; and in arts marketing, public relations, and television production roles. She worked as a book publicist for ten years.

=== Writing ===
In her first novel, A Taste for It (2001), McInerney tracks the travels of an Australian chef, Maura Carmody, as she bungles her way around Ireland. The book established themes of romance, dislocation, and adventure that McInerney would expand upon for years to come.

Between 2002 and 2005 McInerney produced four novels – Upside Down Inside Out (2002), Spin the Bottle (2003), The Alphabet Sisters (2004), and Family Baggage (2005) – which also traversed themes of romance, travel and family dynamics, to increasingly positive reviews. In a 2004 review of Alphabet Sisters, The Age newspaper's Christopher Bantick wrote that McInerney's departure from romantic comedy allowed for a sharpened "exploration of contemporary women and their relationships." Of Family Baggage, Marie Claire magazine wrote: "With every book, Monica McInerney becomes more skilled at juggling plot complexities and giving depth to her characters…"

In 2006, McInerney was the main ambassador for the Australian Government's 'Books Alive' national reading campaign, for which she wrote a limited edition novella called Odd One Out. McInerney's sixth novel, Those Faraday Girls (2007), won General Fiction Book of the Year at the Australian Book Industry Awards. In a review of the book, Sydney's Sun Herald newspaper described McInerney as: "Australia’s answer to Maeve Binchy, a modern-day Jane Austen."

McInerney's 2008 collection of short stories, All Together Now, was shortlisted for General Fiction Book of the Year in the 2009 Australian Book Industry Awards. Hobart's Mercury newspaper described the collection as: "stories that will edify and bring a tear to the eye as well. Yes, this can be from laughter at McInerney’s sense of fun and playfulness, but also in the tender observations she makes of the frailty of love and life."

For her next novel, 2010's At Home with the Templetons, McInerney expanded on the exploration of family dynamics, broadening the scope of the interactions to those amongst two families. In an interview with Fancy Goods she explained: "What I wanted to do with this novel was bring two very different families – the seven unruly Templetons and the smaller unit of Nina Donovan and her son Tom – into each other’s orbit, with good and bad consequences. I also wanted to touch on issues such as jealousy in its many and damaging forms, the lasting impact of grief, the different aspects of motherhood and marriage, sibling rivalry and sibling loyalty, contrasting parenting styles, family secrets and lies, all against a background as rich in comedy and drama as possible." Her 2011 release, Lola's Secret – "A funny, sad and moving novel about memories and moments and the very meaning of life" – was shortlisted for the Australian Book Industry Awards, General Fiction Book of the Year in 2012 and later became available as a Pink Popular Penguin, raising funds to place breast-care nurses in rural Australia.

In 2012's The House of Memories, McInerney explores the reverberations of grief after the death of a child, calling on the despair she'd experienced at the loss of her own father. In an interview in 2012, McInerney explained: "Grief is the rawest of human emotions and it is different for everybody who goes through it. Once I opened myself to thinking about that, it seemed to be everywhere. I've been really bowled over by the emails I've been getting from readers; so many people have been through something like this." McInerney published two short stories as an eBook titled The Christmas Gift in 2013 and released her 11th major work, Hello from the Gillespies, in October 2014, which is described as "A funny and heartfelt novel about miscommunication and mayhem in a family like no other." Hello from the Gillespies was included on Oprah Winfrey's "Three Books to Take on a Flight" list, as well as Booktopia's 2014 Books of the Year and Australia's Favourite Author polls, and the Huffington Post's 2015 Top 10 Novels to Read this Winter list.

In her 2017 novel, The Trip of a Lifetime, McInerney reacquaints readers with the Quinlan family, previously featured in The Alphabet Sisters and Lola's Secret. The wilful and eccentric Lola Quinlan takes her beloved granddaughter and great-granddaughter to visit her Irish homeland – her first time back in more than 60 years. In an interview with the Better Reading website, McInerney explained: ‘Recently I’ve been preoccupied with the meaning of home, pulled between my Irish and Australian lives and families. The question “Where is home now?” sparked this new book, explored through the eyes and life of one of my favourite characters, Lola Quinlan. I don't write factually autobiographical books, but they are all emotionally biographical.”

McInerney’s 2020 novel, The Godmothers, (also shortlisted for the ABIA General Fiction Book of the Year) is a family mystery following 30-year-old Eliza as she searches for the father she has never met and the truth about her troubled mother’s life. Set in Australia, Scotland, Ireland and England, it was inspired by McInerney’s reflections on the secrets that one generation hides from the next. “Along with themes of mental health, truth, loyalty, friendship and identity, Monica McInerney gives great depth as well as entertainment … a book about humanity and what makes us who we are.”

In 2021, McInerney published her first children's book, Marcie Gill and the Caravan Park Cat, for middle grade readers. Bookseller and Publisher magazine described it as: “Delightfully daggy and uproariously funny, this book is perfectly pitched to an audience of 8-12 year olds and their read-aloud companions.”

Her 13th adult novel, When Sullivan Met Lola, will be published in Australia & New Zealand in September 2026. It explores the unlikely friendship between 86-year-old Lola Quinlan and 12-year-old Sullivan Farrington, two characters who have featured in some of McInerney's previous books. McInerney will undertake an extensive promotional tour of Australia for the book later this year. Full details are on the Penguin Random House Australia website.

== Published works ==
- A Taste for It (2000)
- Upside Down Inside Out (2002)
- Spin the Bottle (2003)
- The Alphabet Sisters (2004)
- Family Baggage (2005)
- Odd One Out (2006)
- Those Faraday Girls (2007)
- All Together Now (2008)
- At Home with the Templetons (2010)
- Lola's Secret 2011
- The House of Memories (2012)
- The Christmas Gift (eBook novella) (2013)
- Hello from the Gillespies (2014)
- The Trip of a Lifetime (2017)
- The Godmothers (2020)
- Marcie Gill and the Caravan Park Cat (2021)
- When Sullivan Met Lola (29 September 2026)

== Recognition ==
In November 2022, a sculpture of McInerney was unveiled opposite her childhood home in Clare. The work, by South Australian sculptor Paul Leditschke, depicts McInerney as a 10-year-old girl reading a book on the rooftop of her family home. It was erected by the Riesling Trail Committee, which manages a 35 km walking and cycling track that runs through the Clare Valley.

=== Awards and nominations ===
- 2008 – Winner, Australian Book Industry Awards (ABIA), General Fiction Book of the Year for Those Faraday Girls
- 2009 – Shortlisted, ABIA, General Fiction Book of the Year for All Together Now
- 2010 – Shortlisted, Irish Book Awards, Popular Fiction for At Home with the Templetons
- 2011 – Shortlisted, Romantic Book of the Year Award, for At Home with the Templetons
- 2011 – Shortlisted, ABIA, General Fiction Book of the YEAR, for At Home with the Templetons
- 2012 – Shortlisted, ABIA, General Fiction Book of the Year for Lola's Secret
- 2018 – Shortlisted, ABIA, General Fiction Book of the Year, for The Trip of a Lifetime
- 2021 – Shortlisted, ABIA, General Fiction Book of the Year, for The Godmothers

== Personal life ==
For more than 30 years, McInerney and her Irish husband have been moving back and forth between Australia and Ireland. Since 2014 they have based themselves in Dublin.
