= Through Soft Air =

Short story collection by Lee Battersby

- First edition Cover art by Ian Field-Richards
- Author: Lee Battersby
- Language: English
- Genre: Short story collection
- Publisher: Prime Books
- Publication date: 2006
- Publication place: Australia
- Media type: Print
- Pages: 280 pp.
- ISBN: 0-8095-5646-4

Through Soft Air is the first short story collection from Australian speculative fiction writer Lee Battersby. Printed in 2006, it was published by US Publisher Prime Books.

The cover art is by Gary Nurrish.

== Stories ==
The collection contains the following stories:

- Father Muerte & the Theft
- Silk
- Carrying the God
- Pass the Parcel
- Through the Window Merrilee Dances
- Elyse (previously unpublished)
- The Divergence Tree
- Jaracara's Kiss (previously unpublished)
- The Hobbyist
- Mikal (previously unpublished)
- Letters to Josie
- A Stone to Mark My Passing
- Vortle
- Ecdysis
- A Very Good Lawyer
- Goodfellow
- Stalag Hollywood (previously unpublished)
- Brillig
- His Calliope(previously unpublished)
- Father Renoir's Hands (previously unpublished)
- Through Soft Air
- Dark Ages (previously unpublished)
- Tales of Nireym
- Father Muerte & the Rain
- Pater Familias

== Critical reception ==
Writing for the Australian Specific in focus website Nicole Murphy noted: that there were stories she felt were "undone", and said that was "A shame, because the idea of the book is terrific."
