= Daikaiju! Giant Monster Tales =

2005 book by Rob Hood

- Daikaiju! Giant Monster Tales first edition cover.
- Author: Robert Hood and Robin Pen (editors)
- Cover artist: Bob Eggleton
- Language: English
- Genre: Speculative fiction anthology
- Publisher: Agog! Press
- Publication date: 2005
- Publication place: Australia
- Media type: Print (hardback)
- Pages: 352 pp (first edition)
- ISBN: 0-9580567-4-9

Daikaiju! Giant Monster Tales is a 2005 speculative fiction anthology edited by Robert Hood and Robin Pen.

== Background ==
Daikaiju! Giant Monster Tales was first published in Australia in 2005 by Agog! Press in hardback format. It won the 2006 Ditmar Award for best collected work. Daikaiju! Giant Monster Tales features 28 stories by 27 authors. Two of the stories featured in the anthology, Richard Harland's "The Greater Death of Saito Saku" and Rosaleen Love's "Once Giants Roamed the Earth", were joint winners of the 2005 Aurealis Award for best fantasy short story. "Once Giants Roamed the Earth" was also a short-list nominee for the 2006 Ditmar Award for best short story but lost to Kaaron Warren's "Fresh Young Widow".

== Contents ==
- "haikaiju", short fiction by Sean Williams
- "Footprint", short fiction by David Carroll
- "Man in Suit!", short fiction by J. M. Shiloh
- "The Unlawful Priest of Todesfall", short fiction by Penelope Love
- "In Final Battle", short fiction by Iain Triffitt
- "The Quiet Agrarian", short fiction by Petri Sinda
- "Read It in the Headlines!", short story by Garth Nix
- "Like a Bug Underfoot", short fiction by Chuck McKenzie
- "The Greater Death of Saito Saku", short fiction by Richard Harland
- "Kungmin Horangi: The People's Tiger", short fiction by Cody Goodfellow
- "Fossils", short fiction by D. G. Valdron
- "Park Rot", short fiction by Skip Peel
- "Newborn", short fiction by Eric Shapiro
- "CALIBOS", short fiction by Paul Finch
- "Crunch Time", short fiction by Michelle Marquardt
- "Once Giants Roamed the Earth", short story by Rosaleen Love
- "Five Bells", short fiction by Trent Jamieson
- "Requiem for a Wild God", short fiction by George Thomas
- "Watching the Titans", short fiction by Chris Dickinson
- "Notes Concerning Events at the Ray Harryhausen Home for Retired Actors", short fiction by Andrew Sullivan
- "Aspect Hunter", short fiction by Anthony Fordham
- "Seven Dates That Were Ruined by Giant Monsters", short fiction by Adam Ford
- "daihaiku", short fiction by Sean Williams
- "Footfall", short fiction by Terry Dartnall
- "Big Day", short fiction by Chris Barnes
- "The Transformer of Worlds", short fiction by Mark Rainey
- "Running", short fiction by Martin Livings
- "Lullabye", short fiction by Doug Wood
- The Tragical History of Guidolon, the Giant Space Chicken, screenplay by Frank Wu
- A Brief History of the Larger-Than-Life, essay by Brian Thomas
