= Rob Hood =

Australian writer (born 1951)

Robert Hood
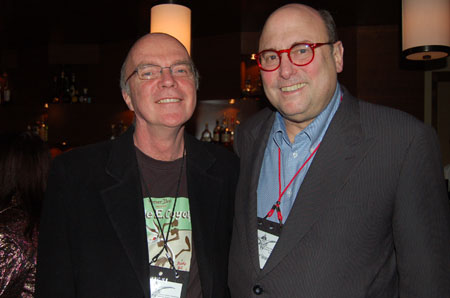
- Robert Hood (left) with Peter Straub in 2007
- Born: Robert Maxwell Hood; 24 July 1951 (age 75); Parramatta, New South Wales, Australia
- Education: Macquarie University
- Occupations: Writer, editor, graphic designer
- Writing career
- Genres: Horror, crime, fantasy, science fiction
- Notable awards: Ditmar Award for Best Collection, William Atheling Jr. Award for Criticism or Review
- Website: www.roberthood.net

Robert Maxwell Hood (born 24 July 1951) is an Australian writer and editor recognised as one of Australia's leading horror writers, although his work frequently crosses genre boundaries into science fiction, fantasy and crime.

He has published five young adult novels, four collections of his short fiction, an adult epic fantasy novel, fifteen children's books and over 120 short stories in anthologies and magazines in Australia and overseas. He has also written plays, academic articles and poetry and co-edited anthologies of horror and crime. He has won seven Ditmars out of twenty nominations, and been nominated for six Aurealis Awards.

== Biography ==
Hood was born in 1951 in Parramatta, New South Wales. At the age of nine, he moved with his family to Collaroy Plateau on the northern beaches of Sydney. His initial experiments in writing began in primary school, where he produced short "flash fiction" style pieces. He continued to write fiction throughout his teens, and in first year of high school commenced his first full-length piece, which he later described with retrospective humour as "a bad Dr Who-type scifi novel", featuring an eccentric professor with a beautiful daughter combating alien invaders and carnivorous plants. He wrote in school exercise books, and not infrequently during his mathematics lessons.

He was interested in fantastic themes, particularly horror and science fiction, from an early age, and recalls devising childhood schemes to convince his parents to allow him to watch late night horror movies. He was fascinated with both classic representations of horror such as Dracula, Frankenstein and Dr Jekyll and Mr Hyde, and more modern examples including "short stories in the form of Weird Tales magazine, Alfred Hitchcock's Anthology, and the Pan Book of Horror Stories". He produced fiction pieces in response to English writing assignments that were far more extensive, elaborate and inventive than expected, and always of a fantastic nature. His teachers made attempts to steer him towards writing in a more naturalistic style, but he eventually won them over with his persistence and inventiveness. After reading H. G. Wells's The War of the Worlds, he became an avid reader of science fiction, but took an interest in a wide range of literary forms.

He commenced study in English Literature at Macquarie University in 1970. His thesis for MA (hons) analysed monster imagery in the works of William Blake.

While at Macquarie University, he wrote 'Caesar or Nothing', a story about a madman taking over the world. With the encouragement of Thea Astley, his tutor, he submitted the piece to ABC Radio. It became his first professional sale, being broadcast on 28 February 1975. In the same year, he won the Canberra Times National Short Story competition. Hood was also involved with the Macquarie University Science Fiction Society (MUSFS) and contributions to its magazine ''Telmar,'' including cartoons and other art, and some short fiction. However, it was another decade before he wrote and sold stories on a regular basis.

After completing his studies, Hood married fellow Macquarie student and writer Margaret (Margi) Curtis in 1982 and entered the teaching profession, including teaching English at Elderslie High School. He was also involved for some time during his first marriage with musical and theatre pursuits – as drummer for Sydney bands Solstice and Knee Deep, and as a performing member of Campbelltown Theatre Group (in productions of ''Godspell'', ''H.M.S. Pinafore'' and "Twelfth Night", the last of which Hood directed). With Margi Curtis and others in the Macarthur region of NSW, he co-founded the semi-professional Nexus Theatre Company in 1983. After workshopping his own play "Firebird" in the Camden Arts Festival that year, Hood and Nexus went on to mount numerous productions of new Australian plays between 1983 and 1986, including two of Hood's own plays, "Still in the Cold World" and "On Getting to the Heart of the Monster, or: The Reviewer's Revenge."

In the decade following completion of his tertiary studies, Hood wrote on an irregularly, submitting stories only sporadically, but making some sales in literary journals. He saw little wider success until he left teaching – which he found a demanding profession leaving him little energy for writing – and began a regular writing regime and became persistent in submitting his work.

In the late 1980s, he wrote a general fiction piece. Under advice from a member of a writing group he was involved in, he reworked the structure to create a greater sense of temporal discontinuity and a more bizarre leaning in the piece. Concurrently, he decided to transform the story into a crime tale, after realising that the presence of a corpse in the story might make it suitable for that market. The resulting tale, "Dead End", became his most republished piece. After submitting it to a crime competition and winning, it gave him contacts that were significant in launching his writing career.

He has otherwise worked in a variety of fields including welding, catering and in a bookshop. He worked as a journalist for the Sydney suburban Liverpool Leader local newspaper and also drew an editorial cartoon on a weekly basis for the publication for close to a decade. Additionally he has worked a research assistant in Australian political history and as a comedy writer for a 2SM breakfast show.

His second wife was poet Deb Westbury. He currently lives in the ACT with his partner—writer, designer and Agog! Press editor Cat Sparks and was Graphic Design & Editorial Officer for the Faculty of Business at the University of Wollongong until retiring in July 2015 to write full-time.

== Writing career ==
=== Short fiction ===
He has published over 120 short works of fiction in Australia and overseas and his work has been included in anthologies and major magazines. His short fiction has spanned a number of genres, including horror, science fiction and crime and he has also published mainstream stories in Australian Literary Journals.

His first published story was "Caesar or Nothing", performed on ABC radio in 1975, Hood won the Canberra Times National Short Story Competition with "Orientation" the same year. One of Hood's most notorious horror tales is the tightly written "Autopsy" (Bloodsongs, January 1994) about a killer's insane quest for the essence of life; it is reputed to have contributed to the magazine in which it appeared being banned in Queensland, something Hood, while aware of the apparent shocking implications of this possibility, views with humorous pride.

In 2007 Hood, a long time Doctor Who fan, who grew up watching the series, published a Doctor Who story set in Prague as part of the Big Finish Short Trips Anthologies. The Prague anthology also featured a number of other Australian authors. He wrote a tale featuring the Sixth Doctor (played by Colin Baker) and his American companion Peri. While Baker may have been considered one of the most unpopular doctors, Hood was attracted to the intense and unpredictable nature of this incarnation of the character.

Other franchise writing by Hood includes the novella "Soul Killer" in Zombies vs Robots: Diplomacy (IDW Publishing, 2013) within the Zombies vs. Robots GN universe.

=== Short Fiction Collections ===
==== Daydreaming on Company Time (1988) ====
A collection of horror, fantasy and crime fiction. It was a runner up for best single author collection in the 1990 Readercon Imaginative Fiction Awards.

==== Immaterial (2002) ====
This collection presents a selection of Hood's ghost stories, representing a range of his characteristic non-conventional takes on the theme, with little evidence of the traditional 'sheet and chain' wielding phantasms familiar from traditional expectations. It covers a considerable variety of style and variance of genre, including tales with a science fiction element. The stories vary from deeply emotional pieces to epics with a cinematic scope and tales where a supernatural origin for a haunting remains uncertain. The anthology is concluded with an interview with Hood, conducted by Kyla Ward.

The story "Number 7", about a couple on holiday coming across a legend suggesting Rudolf Hess survived and his double perished in Spandau prison, received an honourable mention in the 2003 Aurealis awards.

==== Creeping in Reptile Flesh (2008) ====
Hood's most recent collection includes one novella and 13 short stories with a cover created by his partner Cat Sparks. It reprints a number of stories first published in US magazines or small press outlets, that have been difficult to obtain since original publication. It also includes three new stories 'Creeping in Reptile Flesh', 'Unravelling' and 'Getting Rid of Mother'. The stories are centred around themes suggested by the titular novella which headlines the volume.

Hood conceived the collection as a follow-up to his 2002 ghost-centered collection Immaterial, in this case collecting some of the best of his non-ghost-related horror stories. The title was inspired by William Blake, whose monstrous imagery was the focus of Hood's MA (Hons) thesis and was intended to be viewed metaphorically, as relating to the feral, monstrous nature hidden within human beings.

The collection was nominated for the 2009 Aurealis for Best Collection and the 2009 Ditmar for Best Collected Work and the title story was nominated for the 2009 Ditmar for Best Australian Novella or Novelette. A revised and expanded edition of this collection was issued by Morrigan Press in 2011.

==== Peripheral Visions: The Collected Ghost Stories (2015) ====
This collection brings together all Hood's 44 ghost stories, published from 1986 to 2015, three of them written especially for the book: "After Image", "Double Speak" and a 22,000-word novella, "The Whimper". Seen by the publisher as a "reference collection", the volume includes an introduction by World Fantasy Award-winning editor, Danel Olson, notes by the author and a bibliography that lists complete publication details, awards and commendations for each story. With the publication of this book, the publisher announced that Peripheral Visions would be the first in a new series of quality dark fiction works under the imprint Dark Phases.

The book won the Australian Shadows Award for Best Collected Work of 2015. The Awards stated: "Peripheral Visions is an ambitious project, a veritable door-stopper of a hardback comprising nearly 800 pages and 29 years of published work. Author Robert Hood demonstrates a dazzling breadth of treatments united under the overarching ghost story theme, writing with intelligence and insight".

=== Novels ===
==== Backstreets (1999) ====
A horrific car accident leaves Kel in a coma, and Bryce, his lifelong friend dead. When Kel awakens he cannot believe his friend is truly gone, and is wracked with guilt, fear and feelings of deep loss. When he begins to experience strange dreams and catch sight of shadowy figures, he comes to believe that Bryce is lost rather than no longer alive.

His journey towards confronting his grief becomes a descent into an often nightmarish world, as he roams the streets of his city home, searching for his friend and encountering a reality beyond everyday society, of the homeless and violence that seemingly echoes his inner trauma. Prior to writing the novel, Hood had experienced the tragedy of the sudden death of his stepson – who was of similar age to Bryce – in an accident. While the novel is not directly autobiographical, aspects of Hood's experiences in the aftermath of the tragedy and those of others around him, were significant in forming the emotional foundations of the piece.

While the setting of novel was based on Sydney, Hood left the exact location ambiguous, referring to it as only 'The City'; his publisher had reservations about a specific Sydney setting, but Hood also wanted to be free to adjust the geography to suit the unfolding narrative.

==== Shades series (2001) ====
The Shades series is a quartet of young adult novels all published in 2001. Consecutive books in the series finish with the first chapter of the following novel. The series comprises Shadow Dance, Night Beast, Ancient Light and Black Sun Rising. The novels feature teenagers who have been drawn into a shadow world feared by ordinary humans.

The first three books are set in a cliffside community based on Hood's Wollongong home, while the fourth book is set in Egypt. The genesis for the Shades series came from a serendipitous encounter with an acquisitions editor at the book launch of Hood's novel Backstreets, who had already worked with Hood on that novel and some of his children's fiction. While viewing a poster for Animorphs at the event, the editor expressed an interest in seeing a proposal for a young adult horror series. Hood formulated this and sent it to her. Receiving the proposal favourably, she assisted Hood in preparing the pitch for her marketing department and the contract was offered solely on the basis on this conceptual material.

Hood's original idea for the series came from a desire to explore a supernatural concept differing from familiar and frequently used tropes such as vampires and the undead. While he started with ideas relating to ghosts and the dead that are not quite dead, further work lead to him envisaging a realm of shadows, reflecting concepts more familiar to science fiction, such as alternative dimensions and dark matter. He then created an original mythology based on these ideas, although he also drew upon aspects of ancient Egyptian, Knights Templar and other mythologies. This connected with the publisher's desire to avoid an obviously horror-based scenario. He was nominated for a 2002 Ditmar for Professional Achievement for the Shades series.

==== Fragments of a Broken Land: Valarl Undead (2013) ====
In 2013 Borgo/Wildside Press published Hood's dark epic fantasy novel Fragments of a Broken Land: Valarl Undead. The novel won the 2014 Ditmar Award for Best Novel.

=== Children's fiction ===
Hood has written fifteen children's books. His Creepers series of horror tales for children, written in collaboration with Bill Condon, ran to nine volumes and was published in Australia from 1996 to 1997 by Hodder Headline. The series includes: Ghoul Man, FreakOut!, Loco-Zombies, Slime Zone, Bone Screamers, Rat Heads, Brain Sucker (written entirely by Condon), Humungoid, and Feeding Frenzy. UK editions were published by Wolfhound Press, Dublin in 1998.

=== Non-fiction ===
Hood has also written authoritative articles on the zombie theme in cinema, on the history of Australian horror films (to 1990), and on giant monster films. One of the latter, "Divided Kingdom: King Kong vs Godzilla" (which he wrote for a book on the 1933 film King Kong -- King Kong Is Back! edited by David Brin (BenBella Books, 2005) -- won the 2006 William Atheling Jr. Award for Criticism or Review.

His essay "Man and Super-Monster: A History of Daikaiju Eiga and its Metaphorical Undercurrents", published in Borderlands #7, was nominated for the 2007 William Atheling Jr. Award for Criticism. He won the 2008 Best Fan Writer Ditmar award for film reviews on his website, the 2009 Ditmar Award for Best Fan writer for his blog Undead Backbrain and also was nominated for the 2009 William Atheling Jr. Award for Criticism for his essay "George A. Romero: Master of the Living Dead."

=== Other writing ===
Between 1983 and 1990 Hood's output included eight plays (two co-written with children's writer Bill Condon) which were variously performed and published; several include supernatural elements (e.g. On Getting to the Heart of the Monster, Or the Reviewers Revenge, first performed 1983). Hood has also written textbooks, an opera libretto, and poetry.

== Writing ==
=== Genre ===
He is recognised as a prominent Australian horror writer, but his work is not constrained by boundaries of genre. Many of his stories contain elements of science fiction or fantasy and can be a mixture of several genres with an apparently playful sense of experimenting with typical conventions and expectations. He has extended this sensibility into his editorial work, co-editing Crosstown Traffic, an anthology collecting stories that purposely mix crime with a number of other genres. He has also written crime and mainstream fiction.

=== Style ===
Hood's stories characteristically mix crime, horror and sometimes sf elements; blurring genre boundaries seems to come naturally to him. His work is marked by a deceptively straightforward style and by an intense sense of humanity (and, at times, humour) underlying his, often bizarre, horror scenarios. Hood's awareness of metaphysics (instanced in his MA (Hons) thesis on monster imagery in the works of William Blake) also contributes to his stories a sophisticated sense of the closeness of life and death.

=== Influences ===
He has suggested that his initial passion for genre writing was sparked by the works of H. G. Wells, whose mixture of optimism and pessimism for the future he believes poignantly captures the dilemma of human existence. He was also greatly influenced by the writings of English romantic poet William Blake and feels that Blake's ideas and images have affected his world view and are often reflected in his writing. He cites film as a major influence, in particular the late night horror films of his youth which led him to read classics such as Frankenstein, Dracula and Dr Jekyll and Mr Hyde. He feels that these works and their film versions, together with classic Universal and Hammer Horror films had left him with an enduring gothic sensibility in his outlook.

== Editorial work ==
He was co-founder, with Bill Congreve of MirrorDanse Books and co-founded Agog! Press with his partner Cat Sparks. He has published five fiction anthologies as co-editor, including three collections of 'Daikaiju' giant monster tales.

=== Crosstown Traffic (1993) ===
The anthology blurs the traditional boundaries of genre expectations by commissioning twelve crime stories from Australian writers, in each case challenging the writer to produce a story that also worked with the conventions of another genre; examples include the western, romance, science fiction, fantasy, and horror. Many of the tales have a bizarre or horror leaning giving the collection a dark fantasy sensibility. It is co-edited with Stuart Coupe and Julie Ogden who were editors of the Mean Streets crime fiction magazine, and includes stories by Jean Bedford, Dominic Cadden, Bill Congreve, Peter Corris, Marele Day, Garry Disher, Terry Dowling, Kerry Greenwood, Robert Hood, Jan McKemmish, Robert Wallace and Steve Wright.

=== Bonescribes: Year's Best Australian Horror 1995 (1996) ===
Co-edited with Bill Congreve, the anthology was the first Australian annual collection of horror stories, showcasing ten horror tales published during 1995, together with a history of Australian horror and a recommended reading list.

The collection includes horror tales by Australian writers typically known for their genre fiction such as Stephen Dedman and Leanne Frahm, and those known for their literary fiction, such as Carmel Bird and Garry Disher. It also included one of Hood's stories, "Dead in the Glamour of Moonlight".

=== Daikaiju anthologies ===
A series of three anthologies of stories about giant monsters, known as 'Daikaiju' in Japanese and familiar through cinematic examples such as Godzilla and King Kong. The volumes are co-edited with Robin Pen and comprise Daikaiju! Giant Monster Tales (2004), Daikaiju!2: Revenge of the Giant Monsters (2007), Daikaiju!3: Giant Monsters vs the World (2007). All three are published by Agog! Press.

The first of the three anthologies was awarded the Ditmar for Best Collection in 2006. Two stories from the collection, The Greater Death of Saito Saku, by Richard Harland and "Once Giants Roamed the Earth" by Rosaleen Love were joint winners of the Fantasy Short Story category in the 2006 Aurealis Awards.

While the Daikaiju genre had previously been well represented in film and comics, it was not well-established as a literary genre and there had been few examples published prior to Hood's anthologies. A call for stories on the theme brought a surprising number and range of tales from around the world and tapped a vein of enthusiasm among writers who had been waiting for such an opportunity. Submissions included stories that invoked the essence of the genre but also those that envisioned new and original ideas drawn from its sensibilities.

A number of short-listed stories were unable to be included in the first volume due to size constraints. Hood had originally intended to publish these in an e-publication, as anthologies on daikaiju are infrequently published and the stories might find difficulty finding a market elsewhere. However a relationship between Agog! and Prime Books in the US, the development of low cost print on demand technology and Prime's support in getting Agog! books on Amazon made it more cost effective to produce further volumes.

== Awards and Award Nominations ==
- Hood is the recipient of the Ditmar Award on four occasions:
  - For Collected Work: Daikaiju! Giant Monster Tales (editor with Robin Pen) (2006)
  - Fan Writer (2007): for film reviews published on his website
  - Fan Writer (2009): for his blog Undead Backbrain
  - Best Novel (2014): for Fragments of a Broken Land: Valarl Undead (Borgo/Wildside Press, 2014).
- He has also twice won The William Atheling Jr. Award for Criticism or Review:
  - For review of The Weight of Water at Hood Reviews, posing the question "is this film a ghost story?") (2005 – Tie with Jason Nahrung)
  - For "Divided Kingdom: King Kong vs Godzilla" (2006)

Other awards include:

- The Australian Golden Dagger Award for Mystery Stories for short story "Dead End" (1988)
- Canberra Times National Short Story Competition with "Orientation" (1975)

Additionally, Hood has been nominated for awards in the speculative fiction field on numerous occasions. He has been twice nominated for the Aurealis Award for Best Horror Short Story – in 2001 for "That Old Black Graffiti" and in 2002 for "Rotten Times". He has received eleven Ditmar nominations for his short fiction for works including: "Ground Underfoot" and "Primal Etiquette" for Short Fiction in 2000; "That Old Black Graffiti" for Short Story in 2001; "Rotten Times" for Short Fiction in 2002; "Moments of Dying" for Short Story in 2009 and "Creeping in Reptile Flesh" for Australian Novella or Novelette in 2009.

Hood's tale "Escena de un Asesinato" (first published in the World Fantasy Award-winning anthology Postcripts #28/29: Exotic Gothic 4, ed. Danel Olson, PS Publishing) was nominated as Best Horror Short Story in the 2012 Aurealis Awards and also in the Long Fiction category of the 2012 Australian Shadows Award (Australian Horror Writers Association). It was also chosen for inclusion in "The Year's best Dark Fantasy and Horror: 2013" (ed. Paul Guran).

== Bibliography ==
=== Collections ===
- Daydreaming on Company Time (Five Islands Press, 1988)
- Immaterial (MirrorDanse Books, 2002)
- Creeping in Reptile Flesh (Altair Australia Books, 2008; expanded reprint, Morrigan Books, 2011)
- Peripheral Visions: Collected Ghost Stories 1986-2015 (Dark Phases/IFWG Publishing Australia, 2015)

=== Novels ===
- Backstreets (Hodder Headline, 1999)(Audio edition by Louis Braille Audio, 2000, read by David Tredinnick).
- Shades series. (Hodder Headline, 2001)
- Fragments of a Broken Land: Valarl Undead (Borgo/Wildside Press, 2013)

=== Children's books ===
- Bad Boy Bunyip Goes Nuts (Ferrero, 1995)
- Pests, Trends series, edited by Meredith Costain (Longman, 1999)
- The Monster Sale, Trends series, edited by Meredith Costain (Longman, 2001)
- The Beast of Dymple Heights, Awesome! Series 1, edited by Meredith Costain (Longman, 2002)
- The Monster War, Just Kids series 5 (Longman, 2002)
- Olivia Adams, Private Eye, Just Kids series 4 (Longman, 2002)
- Hard Rock Rodney, Awesome! Series 2, edited by Meredith Costain (Longman, 2003)

=== Works edited ===
- Crosstown Traffic (Five Islands Press, 1993) (with Stuart Coupe and Julie Ogden)
- Bonescribes: Year's Best Australian Horror 1995] (Mirrordanse, 1996) (with Bill Congreve)
- Daikaiju! Giant Monster Tales (Agog! Press, 2004) (with Robin Pen)
- Daikaiju!2: Revenge of the Giant Monsters (Agog! Press, 2007) (with Robin Pen)
- Daikaiju!3: Giant Monsters vs the World (Agog! Press, 2007) (with Robin Pen)

=== Selected Short stories ===
- "Tamed" (1998) in Dreaming Down-Under (ed. Jack Dann, Janeen Webb)
- "That Old Black Graffiti" (2000) in Tales from the Wasteland (ed. Paul Collins)
- "Rotten Times" (2001) in Aurealis #27/28 (ed. Dirk Strasser, Stephen Higgins)
- "Beware! The Pincushionman" (2003) in Southern Blood: New Australian Tales of the Supernatural (ed. Bill Congreve)
- "Regolith" (2004) in Agog! Smashing Stories (ed. Cat Sparks)
- "Kulpunya" (2008) in Exotic Gothic 2 (ed. Danel Olson)
- "Behind Dark Blue Eyes" (2009) in Exotic Gothic 3 (ed. Danel Olson)
- "Escena de un Asesinato" (May 2012) in Exotic Gothic 4 (ed. Danel Olson)

== Sources ==
- Mike Ashley & William G. Contento. The Supernatural Index: A Listing of Fantasy, Supernatural, Occult, Weird and Horror Anthologies. Westport, CT: Greenwood Press, 1995, p. 303
- Leigh Blackmore. "Robert [Maxwell] Hood" in S.T. Joshi and Stefan Dziemianowicz (eds). Supernatural Literature of the World: An Encyclopedia. Westport, CT: Greenwood Press, 2005, pp. 563–4.
- Paul Collins. MUP Encyclopedia of Australian Fantasy & Science Fiction (Melbourne Uni Press, 1998). pp. 91–92
- David Pringle(ed). St James Guide to Horror, Ghost & Gothic Writers (St James Press, 1998), pp. 281–83 (entry by Steven Paulsen and Sean McMullen)
- Bryce J. Stevens Fear Codex: Australian Encyclopedia of Dark Fantasy & Horror (Jacobyte Books CDROM, Sept 2000)

Interviews include:

- Kyla Ward's "An Interview" which appears in Hood's Immaterial (Mirrordanse, 2002)
- Deborah Biancotti's "Robert Hood" at
- Jeff Ritchie's interview on Scary Minds
