= Adam Browne =

Australian speculative fiction writer

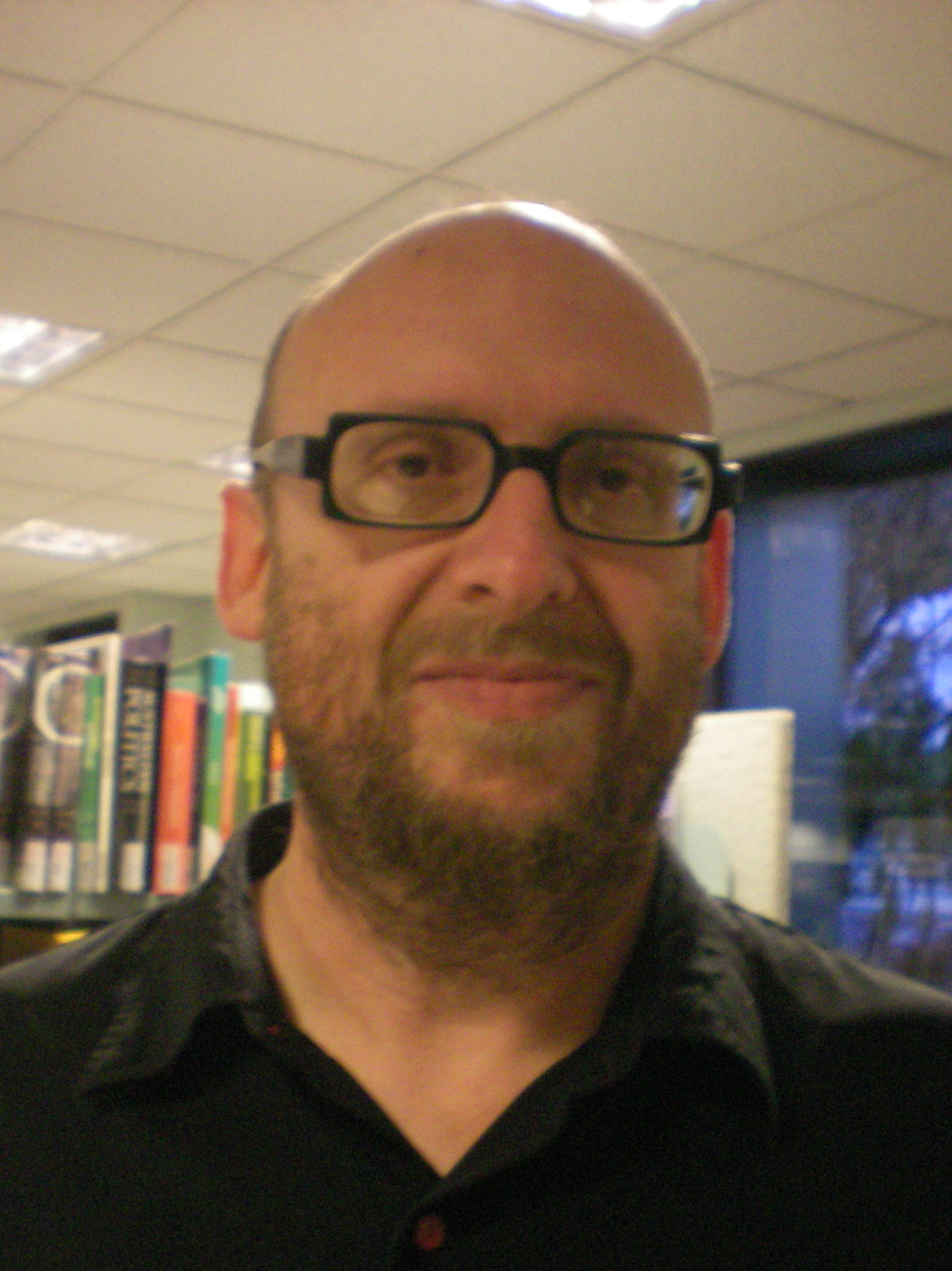
- Born: 1963 (age 61–62)
- Occupation: Speculative fiction writer

Adam Browne (born 1963) is an Australian speculative fiction writer. He lives in Melbourne, Australia. Browne illustrates his own work.

== Bibliography ==
=== Books ===
- Pyrotechnicon: Being a True Account of the Further Adventures of Cyrano de Bergerac Among the States and Empires of the Stars, by Himself (dec'd) – Coeur de Lion Publishing (Australia), 2012
- "Other Stories," and Other Stories – Satalyte (Australia), 2014
- The Tame Animals of Saturn - Peggy Bright Books (Australia), 2016

=== Short fiction ===
- "Orlando's Third Trance" -HQ Magazine (Australia), 1999
- "Account Dracula" -Orb Magazine (Australia), 1999
- "Rococo Cola" -Orb Magazine (Australia), 2000
- "Schrödinger's Catamaran" -Orb Magazine (Australia), 2000,
- "The Weatherboard Spaceship" – Aurealis Magazine (Australia), 2001
- "Widow City" -Ideomancer (US), 2001
- "Nativity Plague" -Aurealis Magazine (Australia), 2001
- "Les Autres" -Ideomancer (US), 2002
- "Ad Nauseam" -NFG Magazine (Canada), 2002
- "Captain Thankless" -Ideomancer Unbound speculative fiction anthology (US), 2002
- "The End of Roentgen Rays" -Talebones Science Fiction Magazine (US), 2002
- "Zombiewaffe" -NFG Magazine (Canada), 2003
- "Space Operetta" -Aurealis Magazine (Australia), 2003
- "Exterminator Rex" -Agog! Science Fiction Anthology (Australia), 2003
- "The Old Man and the Sun" -NFG Magazine (Canada), 2003
- "The Nativity Plague" (republished) -Nowa Fantastyka (Poland), 2004
- "Ringcycle" (co-written with John Dixon) -Aurealis Magazine (Australia), 2004
- "Blood Drunk" -NFG Magazine (Canada), 2004
- "Ringcycle" (co-written with John Dixon) -Aurealis Magazine (Australia), 2004
- "Heart of Saturday Night" -Lenox Ave Magazine (US), 2005
- "Sun King" -Andromeda Spaceways Inflight Magazine (Australia), 2006
- "Obituary Boy" (with John Dixon) -Andromeda Spaceways Inflight Magazine (Australia), 2006
- "Blood Drunk" Cardigan Press Anthology (Australia), 2006
- "Postdiluvian" Aurealis Magazine (Australia), 2006
- "Heart of Saturday Night" (republished) Australian Dark Fantasy and Horror: the Best of 2005, Edited by Angela Challis & Shane Jiraiya Cummings (Brimstone Press, 2006)
- "Neverland Blues" – Dreaming Again (Australia), 2009
- "The D____d" – Light Touch Paper, Stand Clear, Peggy Bright Books (Australia), 2013

== Awards ==
=== Chronos Award ===
- "Neverland Blues", received the Chronos award for best Australian sf short story (2009)

=== Aurealis Award ===
- "Heart of Saturday Night" shortlisted for Aurealis Award for best Australian fantasy short story (2006)
- "The Weatherboard Spaceship" winner of the Aurealis award for best Australian sf short story (2002)
- "Schrödinger's Catamaran" shortlisted for Aurealis award for best Australian sf short story (2001)
- "Orlando's Third Trance" shortlisted for Aurealis award for best Australian fantasy story. (2000)

== Interviews ==
In 2016 Browne was interviewed by Shauna O’Meara as part of the Australian SF Snapshot Project.
