= Rosaleen Love =

Australian writer

Rosaleen Love (born 1940) is an Australian science journalist and writer. She has a PhD in the history and philosophy of science from the University of Melbourne. She has written works on the Great Barrier Reef and other science or conservation topics. She has also written science fiction, which has been noted for her use of irony and feminism. She has been nominated for the Ditmar Award six times, and won the Chandler Award in 2009.

== Bibliography ==
=== Collections ===
- The Total Devotion Machine and Other Stories (1989)
- Evolution Annie and Other Stories (1993)
- The Traveling Tide (2005)
- Secret Lives of Books (2014)

=== Short fiction ===
- "The Laws of Life" (1985) in The Total Devotion Machine and Other Stories
- "Trickster" (1986) in The Total Devotion Machine and Other Stories
- "Alexia and Graham Bell" (1986) in Aphelion Science Fiction Magazine, Summer 1986/1987 (ed. Peter McNamara), and in The Total Devotion Machine and Other Stories
- "No Resting Place" (1987) in The Total Devotion Machine and Other Stories
- "The Sea-Serpent of Sandy Cape" (1987) in The Total Devotion Machine and Other Stories
- "Power Play" (1987) in The Total Devotion Machine and Other Stories
- "The Invisible Woman" (1988) in The Total Devotion Machine and Other Stories
- "If You Go Down to the Park Today" (1989) in The Total Devotion Machine and Other Stories
- "The Total Devotion Machine" (1989) in The Total Devotion Machine and Other Stories
- "Bat Mania" (1989) in The Total Devotion Machine and Other Stories
- "Tanami Drift" (1989) in The Total Devotion Machine and Other Stories
- "Dolphins and Deep Thought" (1989) in The Total Devotion Machine and Other Stories
- "The Bottomless Pit" (1989) in The Total Devotion Machine and Other Stories
- "Where Are They?" (1989) in The Total Devotion Machine and Other Stories
- "The Children Don't Leave Home Any More" (1989) in The Total Devotion Machine and Other Stories
- "The Tea Room Tapes" (1989) in The Total Devotion Machine and Other Stories
- "Tremendous Potential for Tourism" (1989) in The Total Devotion Machine and Other Stories
- "The Heavenly City, Perhaps" (1990) in Evolution Annie and Other Stories
- "Hovering Rock" (1990) in Aurealis #2 (ed. Stephen Higgins, Dirk Strasser), and in Evolution Annie and Other Stories
- "Turtle Soup" (1990) in Eidolon (Australian magazine), Spring 1990 (ed. Jeremy G. Byrne), and in Evolution Annie and Other Stories
- "Cosmic Dusting" (1991) in Evolution Annie and Other Stories
- "Evolution Annie" (1991) in Evolution Annie and Other Stories
- "The Palace of the Soul" (1991) in Evolution Annie and Other Stories
- "Strange Things Grow at Chernobyl" (1991) in Evolution Annie and Other Stories
- "Blue Venom" (1991) in Eidolon (Australian magazine), Spring 1991 (ed. Jeremy G. Byrne), and in Evolution Annie and Other Stories
- "Holiness" (1992) in Intimate Armageddons (ed. Bill Congreve), and in Evolution Annie and Other Stories
- "Mortal Remains" (1993) in Crank!, Fall 1993 (ed. Bryan Cholfin)
- "Starbaby" (1993) in Overland Summer 1993
- "A Pattern to Life" (1993) in Evolution Annie and Other Stories
- "The Daughters of Darius" (1993) in Evolution Annie and Other Stories
- "Bubbles in the Cosmic Saucepan" (1993) in The Traveling Tide
- "The Know-All" (1995) in She's Fantastical (ed. Judith Raphael Buckrich, Lucy Sussex)
- "Sex and Death" (1995) in Eidolon (Australian magazine), Winter 1995 (ed. Jeremy G. Byrne)
- "The Reef Builders" (1997) with Karen Joy Fowler and Maureen F. McHugh and Terry Bisson in Omni Online, May 1997 (ed. Ellen Datlow)
- "Alexander's Feats" (1997) in Eidolon (Australian magazine), Issue 25/26 (ed. Jeremy G. Byrne, Richard Scriven), and in The Traveling Tide
- "Real Men" (1998) in Dreaming Down-Under (ed. Jack Dann, Janeen Webb)
- "Two Recipes for Magic Beans" (1998) in Dreaming Down-Under (ed. Jack Dann, Janeen Webb)
- "The Worst Thing in the World" (1999) in Ghosts and Ghoulies (ed. Paul Collins, Meredith Costain)
- "The Secret of Morning Glory" (2000) in Alien Encounters (ed. Paul Collins, Meredith Costain)
- "Turtles All the Way Down" (2001) in The Rhizome Factor, April 2001 (ed. Cathy Cupitt)
- "True to the Task" (2002) in Quests and Tests (ed. Paul Collins, Meredith Costain)
- "In the Shadow of the Stones" (2003) in Southern Blood: New Australian Tales of the Supernatural (ed. Bill Congreve), and in The Traveling Tide
- "The Raptures of the Deep" (2003) in Gathering the Bones (ed. Ramsey Campbell, Jack Dann, Dennis Etchison)
- "The Gate of Heaven" (2003) in Forever Shores (ed. Margaret Winch, Peter McNamara)
- "GoGo" (2005) in The Traveling Tide
- "Wanderer 8" (2005) in The Elastic Book of Numbers (ed. Allen Ashley)
- "Once Giants Roamed the Earth" (2005) in Daikaiju! Giant Monster Tales (ed. Robin Pen, Robert Hood), and in The Traveling Tide
- "No Man's Land" (2007) in The WisCon Chronicles, Volume 1 (ed. L. Timmel Duchamp)
- "Riding on the Q-Ball" (2008) in Dreaming Again (ed. Jack Dann)
- "Kiddofspeed" (2014) in Secret Lives of Books
- "Qasida" (2014) in Secret Lives of Books
- "The Kairos Moment" (2014) in Secret Lives of Books
- "The Secret Lives of Books" (2014) in Secret Lives of Books
- "The Slut and the Universe" (2014) in Secret Lives of Books
- "Snowflakes All the Way Down" (2016) in Dreaming in the Dark (ed. Jack Dann)
- "Bright Shores" (2018) in Mother of Invention (Rivqa Rafael, Tansy Rayner Roberts)

You Can't Get There from Here (2022) in Phase Change: Imagining Energy Futures (ed. Matthew Chrulew)

=== Anthologies edited ===
- If Atoms Could Talk (1987)

=== Non-fiction ===
- Reefscape: Reflections on the Great Barrier Reef (2000)

=== Essays ===
- Ursula K. le Guin and Therolinguistics (1998)
- The Onion Skin Theory of Identity, the Paint Pot Theory of Gender, and the Blu-Tack Theory of Position (1999)
- Star Drover (2001)
- In Tribulation and with Jubilee: On Pilgrimage with Bridie King (2005)
