= Agog! Press =

Australian book publisher

- Type: Book publisher
- Founded: 2002
- Founder: Cat Sparks
- Headquarters: Australia

Agog! Press was an independent Australian book publisher, specializing in speculative fiction short story collections. Founded in 2002 by Cat Sparks, the press published ten anthologies of speculative fiction by Australian writers.

Agog! Press shut down in 2008 after publishing its final anthology, Canterbury 2100: Pilgrimages in a new world, because Cat Sparks and Rob Hood wished to focus more on their own writing.

In 2006, Agog! Press forged a collaboration with United States publisher Prime Books, which led to international (US) distribution of Agog! titles in both hard and soft cover.

== Titles ==
- Agog! Ripping Reads (2006), ed. Cat Sparks, ISBN 0-8095-6237-5
- Canterbury 2100: Pilgrimages in a new world (2008), ed. Dirk Flinthart, ISBN 978-0-8095-7327-1
- Daikaiju! Giant Monster Tales (2005), ed. Rob Hood and Robin Pen, ISBN 0-9580567-4-9
- Daikaiju!2: Revenge of the Giant Monsters (2007), ed. Rob Hood and Robin Pen, ISBN 978-0-8095-7231-1
- Daikaiju!3: Giant Monsters vs the World (2007), ed. Rob Hood and Robin Pen, ISBN 978-0-8095-7233-5
- Agog! Smashing Stories (2004), ed. Cat Sparks, ISBN 0-9580567-3-0
- Agog! Terrific Tales (2003), ed. Cat Sparks, ISBN 0-9580567-2-2
- Agog! Fantastic Fiction (2002), ed. Cat Sparks, ISBN 0-9580567-0-6
- AustrAlien Absurdities (2002), ed. Chuck McKenzie and Tansy Rayner Roberts
- Scary Food: A Compendium of Gastronomic Atrocity (2008) ed. Cat Sparks, ISBN 978-0-9580567-5-5. A charity anthology to raise money for the treatment of Paul Haines, who had been diagnosed with cancer. All authors donated their stories.
