= MirrorDanse Books =

Independent book publisher

MirrorDanse Books, founded in 1994, was one of Australia's longest running independent book publishers of science fiction and horror.

Between 2005 and 2008 inclusive, MirrorDanse Books published the Year's Best Australian SF & Fantasy anthology series, edited by Bill Congreve and Michelle Marquardt. Published annually, the Year's Best reprints selected short stories by authors who either have Australian citizenship, or reside in Australia. Each volume also listed recommended reading for the year. Recommended reading lists were produced for 2004, 2005, 2006, and 2007. ,

The imprint has been inactive since 2009.

== Titles ==
- Immaterial (2002), collected works of Robert Hood, ISBN 0-9586583-6-6
- Rynosseros (2003), the first volume of the Tom Tyson saga, by Terry Dowling, ISBN 0-9586583-4-X
- Wonder Years: The Ten Best Australian Stories of a Decade Past (2003), selected by Peter McNamara, ISBN 0-9586583-7-4
- Confessions of a Pod Person (2005), collected works of Chuck McKenzie, ISBN 0-9757852-1-4
- A Tour Guide in Utopia (2005), collected works of Lucy Sussex, ISBN 0-9757852-0-6
- Written in Blood (2005), collected works of Chris Lawson, ISBN 0-9586583-9-0
- Year's Best Australian Science Fiction & Fantasy, Volume One (2005), ed. Bill Congreve & Michelle Marquardt, ISBN 0-9757736-0-7
- Year's Best Australian Science Fiction & Fantasy, Volume Two (2006), ed. Bill Congreve & Michelle Marquardt, ISBN 0-9757736-1-5
- Year's Best Australian Science Fiction & Fantasy, Third Annual Volume (2007), edited by Bill Congreve & Michelle Marquardt, ISBN 978-0-9757736-2-8
- Year's Best Australian Science Fiction & Fantasy, Fourth Annual Volume (2008), edited by Bill Congreve & Michelle Marquardt, ISBN 978-0-9757736-3-5
