= Aurealis =

Australian speculative fiction magazine

Aurealis is an Australian speculative fiction magazine published by Chimaera Publications, and is Australia's longest running small-press science-fiction and fantasy magazine. The magazine is based in Melbourne.

Notable contributors have included Sean Williams, George Turner, Paul Haines, Kaaron Warren, Richard Harland, K. J. Bishop, Simon Brown, Stephen Dedman, Shane Dix, Hoa Pham, Maria Lewis, Lucy Sussex, Trent Jamieson, Kim Westwood, Adam Browne, Jack Heath and Geoffrey Maloney.

Staff at the magazine have included Michael Pryor, Trudi Canavan, Sara Creasy, Bill Congreve and Andrew J. McKiernan.

Shaun Tan did much of the early cover art and redesigned the look of the magazine.

== History and profile ==
Aurealis was launched in September 1990 to provide a market for speculative fiction writers, with a particular emphasis on raising the profile of Australian authors. In October 2011, the magazine became a monthly e-publication (published every month except January and December).

In 1995, the magazine instituted the Aurealis Awards for Excellence in Australian Speculative Fiction.

== Notable stories featured ==
- "Whispers of the Mist Children" by Trudi Canavan in issue #23, won the 1999 Aurealis Award for best fantasy short story
- "The World According to Kipling (A Plain Tale from the Hills)" in issue #25/26, won the 2000 Aurealis Award for best fantasy short story
- "Catabolic Magic" by Richard Harland in issue #32, won the 2004 Aurealis Award for best fantasy short story and was a short-list nominee for best Australian novella or novelette at the 2005 Ditmar Awards
- "The Other-faced Lamb" by Catherine Smyth-McMullen (published under C.S. McMullen) in issue #82 was the first Aurealis short story to be adapted into a feature film with 2019's award-winning The Other Lamb, starring Michael Huisman.
- "The House That Hungers" by Maria Lewis in issue #149 was adapted into a short film of the same name in 2023.

== Reviews ==
- Australian Realms #30

== See also ==
- Science fiction magazine
- Fantasy fiction magazine
- Horror fiction magazine
