= Aurealis Award =

Annual literary award

- Awarded for: Excellence in speculative fiction
- Location: Australia
- Country: Australia
- Presented by: Chimaera Publications; Conflux Inc
- First award: 1996 (for 1995)
- Website: queenslandwriters.org.au

The Aurealis Award for Excellence in Speculative Fiction is an annual literary award for Australian science fiction, fantasy and horror fiction. Only Australians are eligible for the award.

== History ==
The Aurealis Award was established in 1995 by Chimaera Publications, the publishers of Aurealis Magazine. Unlike the other major Australian speculative fiction award, the Ditmar Award, it divides work into subgenre and age categories, and is judged as such.

The award was originally given out in the following divisions: Science Fiction, Fantasy, Horror, and Young Adult. Two separate awards are given in each of those divisions, one for novels and one for short stories. A fifth division for Children's books was added in 2001 for fiction for 8-12 year olds, with separate awards for "Short Fiction" and "Long Fiction". With the 2008 Awards the "Short Fiction" children's fiction category became a category for "Illustrated Work/Picture Book". For the 2010 Awards, the two categories became one for children's fiction told primarily through pictures and another for children's fiction told primarily through words. For the 2013 Awards, the two categories were merged into a single category for children's books. The Young Adult and Children's categories cover books in all three speculative fiction genres.

Submissions within a division are reviewed by a judging panel of at least three members, which selects each year's finalists and winners for their respective division. One of the judges on each panel is also the panel Convenor.

Two changes to the award structure were introduced in 2004. The awards became administered by Fantastic Queensland, a volunteer group that promotes Australian speculative fiction. A new division was added, Golden Aurealis, for both short stories and books, drawn from the winners of the other divisions.

There is also an associated Peter McNamara Conveners' Award for Excellence for "a particular achievement in speculative fiction or related areas in the relevant year, but may also take into account achievements over a number of years. This may also be for a non-fiction work, a collection or anthology, an art work, or for a body of work that brings credit and/or attention to the speculative fiction genre in that year". The award was originally known as the Convenors' Award for Excellence and was renamed in 2002 after Peter McNamara (d. 2004), the original award Convenor, shortly after he was diagnosed with an incurable disease. It is given out at the discretion of the Convenors.

After six years of being the administrator, Fantastic Queensland ended their partnership with Chimaera Publications. On 18 May 2010 it was announced that Chimaera had entered a new deal with SpecFaction NSW who would administer the awards for 2010. Later in 2010 SpecFaction NSW announced that they reached a deal with HarperVoyager to be the exclusive sponsor for the 2010 Awards which would be held in May 2011.

After three years of running the awards, SpecFaction NSW, decided they would not continue hosting the awards. On 7 May 2013 it was announced that Chimaera Publications had reached an agreement with Conflux Inc, who will host the awards for the next two years. In addition, the awards ceremony would be held in Canberra. In May 2015 it was announced that the Western Australian Science Fiction Foundation (WASFF) would be overseeing the awards for the next three years. Following WASFF's tenure, the Awards moved to be hosted by the Continuum Foundation (ConFound), a Melbourne based group, from 2018 to 2020, before moving back to Canberra from 2021, this time overseen by the Canberra Speculative Fiction Guild (CSFG).

In 2016, the short story categories for science fiction, fantasy, and horror were subdivided into categories for short story and novella.

== Categories ==
=== Current awards ===
- Best anthology: 2008 to present
- Best children’s fiction: 2013 to present (merging two previous categories)
- Best collection: 2008 to present
- Best fantasy novel: 1995 to present
- Best fantasy novella: 2016 (for 2015 awards)
- Best fantasy short story: 1995 to present
- Best horror novel: 1995 to present
- Best horror novella: 2016 (for 2015 awards)
- Best horror short story: 1995 to present
- Best illustrated book/graphic novel: 2008 to present
- Best science fiction novel: 1995 to present
- Best science fiction novella: 2016 (for 2015 awards)
- Best science fiction short story: 1995 to present
- Best young adult novel: 1995 to present
- Best young adult short story: 1995 to present
- Convenors' Award for excellence: 1998 to present
- Sara Douglass Book Series Award: 2015

Also presented at Aurealis Awards ceremonies since the 2009 awards, although not officially an Aurealis Award, is the Kris Hembury Encouragement Award.

During the years 2001 to 2007 the category "best children’s illustrated work/picture book" was simply known as "best children’s short fiction" and "best children's novel" was known as "best children's long fiction". From 1998 to 2000 the Peter McNamara Convenors' Award for excellence was known simply as the Convenors' Award for excellence but was changed in honour of Peter McNamara the original convenor.

In earlier years the eligibility period was 1 November to 31 October, rather than the current 1 January to 31 December. The transitional period was the 2010 Awards for which the eligibility period was 1 November 2009 to 31 December 2010.

=== Retired or merged awards ===
- Golden Aurealis for best novel: 2004 to 2007
- Golden Aurealis for best short story: 2004 to 2007
- Aurealis Award for best children's fiction (told primarily through words): 2001 to 2012
- Aurealis Award for best children's fiction (told primarily through pictures): 2001 to 2012
