= Steven Paulsen =

Australian writer (born 1955)

- Born: 1955 (age 70–71); Melbourne, Australia
- Occupations: Writer, Editor
- Writing career
- Period: 1982 to present
- Genres: Science fiction, fantasy, horror
- Website: stevenpaulsen.com

Steven Paulsen (born 1955) is an Australian writer and editor of science fiction, fantasy and horror fiction whose work has been published in books and magazines around the world. He is the author of the best selling children's book, The Stray Cat, which has seen publication in several foreign language editions. His short story collection, Shadows on the Wall: Weird Tales of Science Fiction, Fantasy and the Supernatural), won the 2018 Australian Shadows Award for Best Collected Work, and his short stories have appeared in anthologies such as Dreaming Down-Under, Terror Australis: Best Australian Horror, Strange Fruit, Fantastic Worlds, The Cthulhu Cycle: Thirteen Tentacles of Terror, Cthulhu Deep Down Under: Volume 3, and Killer Creatures Down Under. His YA historical fantasy novel, Dream Weaver, was nominated for the 2024 Ditmar Award for Best Novel.

Paulsen has also written extensively about Australian speculative fiction in various publications including Bloodsongs, Eidolon (Australian magazine), Sirius, Interzone, The Encyclopedia of Fantasy, Fantasy Annual, The St James Guide to Horror, Ghost and Gothic Writers, and The Melbourne University Press Encyclopedia of Australian Science Fiction and Fantasy. In the 1990s he conceived and edited The Australian SF Writer's News, a writer's resource magazine for Australian Speculative Fiction writers, which was later incorporated into Aurealis magazine. He has conducted interviews with a variety of Australian Speculative Fiction writers, and was a judge for 2000 Aurealis Awards.

He has also co-edited two anthologies of horror, fantasy and science fiction short stories with Christopher Sequeira: Nosferatu Unbound (shortlisted for the 2024 Australasian Shadows awards for Best Collected Work); a collection of fiction by contemporary horror writers inspired by FW Murnau's masterpiece of German Expressionist cinema Nosferatu. Into the Cthulhu-Universe: Lovecraftian Horrors in Other Literary Realities; a collection of tales where strange Lovecraftian ideas have spilled into the worlds of characters readers know and love, like Alice's Wonderland, Tom Sawyer, Dracula, John Carter of Mars and more. Not mash-ups, but original stories in other literary landscapes.

== Awards and nominations ==
=== Wins ===
- 1990 Eastern Regional Libraries Short Story Competition – Special Local Award for "Talisman”
- 1996 William Atheling Jr. Award for "The Hunt for Australian Horror Fiction" with Bill Congreve, Sean McMullen, The Scream Factory No. 16.
- 1998 William Atheling Jr. Award for "Australian Fantasy" with Sean McMullen.
- 2018 Australian Shadows Awards for "Best Collected Work" for Shadows on the Wall (IFWG Publishing).

=== Nominations ===
- 1997 Ditmar Award nomination for Best Australian Short Fiction: The Stray Cat (runner-up)
- 1998 William Atheling Jr. Award nomination for Contributions to The MUP Encyclopaedia of Australian Science Fiction & Fantasy
- 1998 Aurealis Award – Convenor's Award nomination for Contributions to The MUP Encyclopaedia of Australian Science Fiction & Fantasy
- 2000 William Atheling Jr. Award nomination for The Coode Street Review of Science Fiction with Jonathan Strahan
- 2000 Ditmar Award for Best Fan Production for The Coode Street Review of Science Fiction with Jonathan Strahan
- 2024 Ditmar Award for Best Novel for Dream Weaver
- 2024 Australasian Shadows Award for Best Collected Work for Nosferatu Unbound (with Christopher Sequeira)

=== Contribution Wins ===
- 1996 Origins Award for Best Game-Related Fiction won by The Cthulhu Cycle: Thirteen Tentacles of Terror edited by Robert M. Price which contained Paulsen's short story 'In the Light of the Lamp'
- 1999 William Atheling Jr. Award won by Paul Collins for The MUP Encyclopaedia of Australian Science Fiction & Fantasy for which Paulsen was Assistant Editor and primary contributor
- 1999 World Fantasy Award for Best Anthology won by Dreaming Down-Under, edited by Jack Dann and Janeen Webb (HarperCollins Australia/Voyager) which contained Paulsen's short story "Ma Rung'
- 1999 Ditmar Award for Best Anthology won by Dreaming Down-Under, edited by Jack Dann and Janeen Webb (HarperCollins Australia/Voyager) which contained Paulsen's short story "Ma Rung"
- 2023 Australasian Shadows Award for Best Edited Work won by Killer Creatures Down Under, edited by Deborah Sheldon (IFWG Publishing) which contained Paulsen's short story "The Warrigals"

== Bibliography ==
=== Books ===
English Language Editions

- The Stray Cat (illustrated by Shaun Tan), Lothian Books, 1996. ISBN 978-0-85091-785-7
- The Stray Cat (illustrated by Shaun Tan), Franklin Watts (UK), 1996. ISBN 978-0-7496-3523-7
- Shadows on the Wall (Weird Tales of Science Fiction, Fantasy and the Supernatural), IFWG Publishing, 2018. ISBN 978-1-925496-44-4
- Dream Weaver (YA Historical Fantasy novel), IFWG Publishing, 2023. ISBN 978-1-922856-35-7

Foreign Language Editions

- Misteri Kucing Tersesat (illustrated by Shaun Tan), PT Elex Media Komputindo (Indonesia), 1997. ISBN 979-663-751-0
- Le Chat Errant, Hachette Jeunesse (France), 1998. ISBN 978-2-01-209831-2
- Die Streunende Katz (illustrated by Shaun Tan), G&G Kinder – und Jugendbuch (Germany), 1999. Hardcover ISBN 978-3-7074-0038-0
- After Dark (illustrated by Shaun Tan), Publisher: Bookhouse Co., Ltd (South Korea), 2002. ISBN 978-0-85091-785-7

Edited Anthologies

- Nosferatu Unbound (with Christopher Sequeira), IFWG Publishing, 2024. ISBN 978-1-925759-61-7.
- Into the Cthulhu-Universe: Lovecraftian Horrors in Other Literary Realities (with Christopher Sequeira), IFWG Publishing, 2025. ISBN 978-1-923382-00-8

=== Short stories (selected) ===
- "Art Critic" – The Cygnus Chronicler, ed. Neville J. Angove, June 1982
- "Logic Loop" – Aphelion Magazine #5, ed. Peter McNamara, Summer 1986/87
- "Errand Run" – Aphelion Magazine #5, ed. Peter McNamara, Summer 1986/87
- "The Place" – Terror Australis No. 1, ed. Leigh Blackmore, Chris G.C. Sequeira and Bryce J. Stevens. April 1988
- "Old Wood" – Terror Australis No. 2, ed. Leigh Blackmore, Chris G.C. Sequeira and Bryce J. Stevens. July 1990
- "Two Tomorrow" – Eidolon (Australian magazine) No. 3 – Spring 1990
- "Stray Cat" – EOD Magazine No. 7. ed. Chris Masters, September 1992
- "Greater Garbo" – Australian & New Zealand PC User, October 1992
- "In the Light of the Lamp" – Terror Australis: Best Australian Horror (Hodder & Stoughton) ed. Leigh Blackmore, 1993
- "Old Wood (reprint) " – Strange Fruit (Penguin Books) – July 1995
- "Two Tomorrow (reprint)" – Beyond (UK) – June 1995
- "In the Light of the Lamp" – The Cthulhu Cycle: Thirteen Tentacles of Terror (Chaosium, USA) ed. Robert M. Price, 1996
- "The Sorcerer's Looking Glass" – Fantastic Worlds (HarperCollins), ed. Paul Collins, February 1997
- "Ma Rung" – Dreaming Down-Under (HarperCollins), ed. Jack Dann and Janeen Webb, 1998
- "Severing Ties" (with Maurice Xanthos) – Short and Twisted (Celapene Press) ed. Kathryn Duncan, 2009
- “Pest Control” – Cthulhu: Deep Down Under (Horror Australis), eds Steve Proposch, Christopher Sequeira and Bryce Stevens, 2015
- “Christmas Morning” – Hell’s Bells: Stories of Festive Fear (the Australian Horror Writers Association) eds. the AHWA Committee, 2016
- “Harold the Hero and the Talking Sword” (with Jack Dann) – And Then… Volume 2 (ed. Ruth Wykes and Kylie Fox), Clan Destine Press, 2017
- “The Black Diamond of the Elephant God” – Shadows on the Wall (IFWG Publishing), 2018
- “Fixed in Time” – Shadows on the Wall (IFWG Publishing), 2018
- “The Wine Cellar” – Shadows on the Wall (IFWG Publishing), 2018
- “The Key to Eternity” – Cthulhu Deep Down Under: Volume 3 (IFWG Publishing), eds. Steve Proposch, Christopher Sequeira and Bryce Stevens, 2021
- “The Warrigals” – Killer Creatures Down Under: Horror Stories with Bite (IFWG Publishing), ed. Deborah Sheldon, 2023

=== Essays (selected) ===
- "The State of the Australian Horror Fiction Magazine" – Bloodsongs No. 1, ed. Chris Masters and Steve Proposch, 1993
- "The Quest for Australian Fantasy" (with Sean McMullen) – Aurealis No. 13, 1994
- "The Search for Early Australian Horror" – Bloodsongs No. 2, ed. Chris Masters and Steve Proposch, 1994
- "The Hunt for Australian Horror" (with Sean McMullen) – Aurealis No. 14, 1994 (reprinted in The Aurealis Mega Oz SF Anthology, edited by Stephen Higgins and Dirk Strasser (Chimaera Publications), 1999 and The Best of the Scream Factory, edited by Peter Enfantino, Robert Morrish and John Scoleri (Cemetry Dance Publications), 2019
- "The Art of HAK" – Bloodsongs No. 3, ed. Chris Masters and Steve Proposch, 1994
- "The State of the Aust. Horror Fiction Magazine (reprint) – SF Fan Resource Book, 1995
- "Pulp Fiction in Oz" – Bloodsongs No. 4, ed. Chris Masters and Steve Proposch, 1995
- "Kid's Stuff " – Bloodsongs No. 5, ed. Chris Masters and Steve Proposch, 1995
- "The Hunt for Australian HorrorFiction" (with McMullen & Congreve) The ScreamFactory #16, 1995
- "Australian Children's TV" (with Sean McMullen) – Sirius No. 10, 1995
- "A Touch of Darkness – Gary Crew)" – Bloodsongs No. 6, ed. Chris Masters and Steve Proposch, 1995
- "Cowboys and Atmosfear)" – Bloodsongs No. 7, ed. Chris Masters and Steve Proposch, 1996
- "Australian Fantasy (with Sean McMullen)" – The Encyclopedia of Fantasy, ed. John Clute and John Grant, 1997
- Author entries (with Sean McMullen) for Conrad Aiken, Gary Crew, Terry Dowling, G. M. Hague, Robert Hood, Victor Kelleher, Rick Kennett, Isaac Bashevis Singer and Rosemary Timperley – St. James Guide to Horror, Ghost & Gothic Writers (St. James Press), ed. David Pringle, 1997
- "A History of Australian Horror (with Sean McMullen & Bill Congreve) " – Bonescribes: Year's Best Australian Horror: 1995 (1996) ed. Bill Congreve and Robert Hood, 1996
- "The Quest for Australian Fantasy – Continues" (with Sean McMullen) – Fantasy Annual (USA), 1997
- "Fantastique et horreur made in Australie" (with Bill Congreve) – Ténèbres No. 3, ed. Daniel Conrad (France), July 1998
- "Golden Age or New Dawn?" – Aussiecon 3 Souvenir Book for the 57th World Science Fiction Convention, ed. Marc Ortlieb, 1999
- "Hakwork: An Appreciation of John Brosnan" – Studies in Australian Weird Fiction Volume 3, ed. Benjamin Szumskyj, 2009

=== Editor (Non-Fiction) ===
- The MUP Encyclopaedia of Australian Science Fiction & Fantasy, 1998 (assistant editor with Sean McMullen and Paul Collins)
- The Australian SF Writers' News – Editor, issues 1–10 (March 1992 – June 1994)
- Eidolon – Contributing Editor, issues 19–27 (1995–1998)
- The Coode St Review of Science Fiction (with Jonathan Strahan), 1999

=== Interviews (selected) ===
Steven Paulsen conducted interviews with a number a leading Australian Speculative Fiction writers during the 1990s. These were notable because Paulsen conducted most of these interviews face-to-face instead of via e-mail, recording the interviews and transcribing the conversations. He also conducted a few interviews in collaboration with Van Ikin.

- Stephen R. Donaldson – Dark Horizons (Journal of the British Fantasy Society), Issue 27, Summer 1983
- Sean McMullen – The Australian SF Writers' News No. 3, September 1992
- Paul Voermans – The Australian SF Writers' News No. 4, December 1992 and Interzone No. 76, October 1993
- Rick Kennett – The Australian SF Writers' News No. 5, March 1993 and Sirius No. 2, June 1993
- Victor Kelleher – The Australian SF Writers' News No. 6, June 1993 and Sirius No. 4, February 1994
- Sherry-Anne Jacobs – The Australian SF Writers' News No. 9, March 1994 and Sirius No. 5, September 1994
- Sean Williams – The Australian SF Writers' News No. 10, June 1994
- Paul Collins – Sirius No. 7, December 1994
- Isobelle Carmody – Sirius No. 8, March 1995
- Paul Jennings – Sirius No. 9, July 1995
- Sean McMullen – Eidolon No. 21, April 1996 and Interzone No. 107, May 1996
- Garth Nix – Eidolon #22/23, September 1996
- Simon Brown – Eidolon #22/23, February 1997
- Lucy Sussex – Eidolon No. 24, June 1997
- Simon Brown "From Sydney to Troy: An Interview with Simon Brown" – Science Fiction: A Review of Speculative Literature # 41, Volume 15, Number 1, 1998 (interview conducted in collaboration with Van Ikin)
- Gary Crew – Eidolon No. 27, April 1998
- Richard Harland – Eidolon No. 27, April 1998 (interview conducted in collaboration with Van Ikin)
- Terry Dowling "Smoking Mirrors, with a Hint of Scrimshaw" Interzone No. 146, August 1999 (interview conducted in collaboration with Van Ikin)
