= Leigh Blackmore =

Australian writer

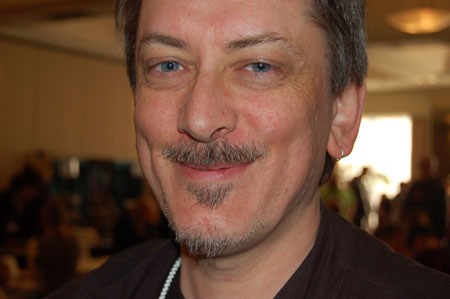
- Leigh Blackmore in 2007
- Born: Leigh David Blackmore; 1959 (age 66–67); Sydney, New South Wales, Australia
- Education: University of Wollongong
- Occupations: editor/proofreader, writer, manuscript assessor, critic, occultist, musician
- Known for: "Uncharted," "Exalted Are the Forces of Darkness", Spores from Sharnoth and Other Madnesses
- Parent(s): Rod Blackmore; Elizabeth Anne James
- Website: http://members.optusnet.com.au/lvxnox/

Leigh (David) Blackmore (born 1959) is an Australian horror writer, critic, editor, occultist, musician and proponent of post-left anarchy. He was the Australian representative for the Horror Writers of America (1994–95) and served as the second President of the Australian Horror Writers Association (2010–2011). His work has been nominated six times for the Ditmar Award, twice for fiction (including Best Collected Work) and four times for the William Atheling Jr. Award for Criticism. He has been a Finalist in both the Poetry and Criticism categories of the Australian Shadows Awards. He has contributed entries to such encyclopedias as S. T. Joshi and Stefan J. Dziemianowicz (eds) Supernatural Literature of the World (Greenwood Press, 2005, 3 vols) and June Pulliam and Tony Fonseca (eds), Ghosts in Popular Culture and Legend (ABC-Clio, 2016).

According to The Melbourne University Press Encyclopedia of Australian Science Fiction and Fantasy, "His name is now synonymous with Australian horror," and a Hodder & Stoughton press release stated that, "Leigh Blackmore is to horror what Glenn A. Baker is to rock and roll." He has also been recognised as "one of the leading weird poets of our era", and has been nominated for the Science Fiction Poetry Association's Rhysling Award. His fiction has appeared in Australia, the US, the UK, France, Denmark and Sweden. Translations of his poetry have appeared in French and Italian.

== Early life (1959–1976) ==
Leigh Blackmore was born in Sydney, New South Wales, the son of Rod and Beth (James) Blackmore.

=== Education ===
He was educated at North Sydney Boys High School (1971–1972) and Newcastle Boys' High School (1972–1976). In high school, after reading the science fiction anthology series "Out of This World" (edited by Mably Owen and Amabel Williams-Ellis), he graduated to devouring the works of Ray Bradbury, Peter Saxon, H. Rider Haggard, Isaac Asimov, Arthur Conan Doyle, Agatha Christie, and Leslie Charteris, and became a keen enthusiast of sword and sorcery fiction as represented by Lin Carter's Flashing Swords anthologies and Thongor series novels, Edgar Rice Burroughs's Martian tales, Michael Moorcock's Elric sequence and others, and horror fiction (especially the Weird Tales school, including Clark Ashton Smith, Robert Bloch, Frank Belknap Long, Donald Wandrei and H.P. Lovecraft's Cthulhu Mythos), discovering their work via anthologies edited by August Derleth, Peter Haining, Karl Edward Wagner (the Year's Best Horror Stories series), and via publications of Arkham House which he special-ordered via Space Age Books (Melbourne), then Australia's only specialist supplier of science fiction and fantasy books.

=== The Arcane Sciences Society; The Horror-Fantasy Society; Azathoth Productions ===
While at high school, Blackmore co-founded the Arcane Sciences Society and the Horror-Fantasy Society; the journal of the societies, Cathuria (named after a place in Lovecraft's story "The White Ship"), was banned after three issues by Blackmore's high school principal for quoting in a review four-letter words used by the unleashed monster in Flesh Gordon. With high school friends Lindsay Walker and Michael Blaxland, Blackmore formed a small independent movie house called Azathoth Productions. The only film made was an uncompleted version of Clark Ashton Smith's story The Double Shadow, though Blackmore also penned a screenplay for Lovecraft's story The Music of Erich Zann (never shot). The screenplay appears in his 2024 collection Nightmare Logic. Blackmore and Walker collaborated on a Lovecraftian story called "The Horror in the Manuscript" for submission to Ramsey Campbell for his anthology New Tales of the Cthulhu Mythos, (Cthulhu Mythos anthology), which did not appear until 1980. The tale was not accepted (though it was also read by Brian Lumley) but Campbell praised the effort and encouraged Blackmore (and Walker) to keep on writing. (This tale finally saw print in Nightmare Logic (2024)).

=== Early writing, fandom and occultism ===
Having corresponded with writers and enthusiasts in the field such as Brian Lumley, Ramsey Campbell, Glenn Lord, W.H. Pugmire and Gregory Nicoll, he began (aged 13) to write fiction and speculative poetry in the vein of Lovecraft and C.A. Smith. Fictional juvenilia included "The Last Town" (a Lord Dunsany pastiche), "The Sacrifice" (based on an image of death from Ingmar Bergman's The Seventh Seal), and an uncompleted sword-and-sorcery novel, Starbreaker (with Ashley Morris). Several of these juvenile tales were first printed in Charles Danny Lovecraft's fanzine Avatar in the 1990s.

Blackmore was a devotee of horror movies principally from the Hammer horror and Amicus Productions era. Samuel Beckett and William S. Burroughs became lasting literary influences at this time, the latter after his high-school English teacher lent him a copy of The Wild Boys (novel).

== Early career and writing (1977–1990) ==
Blackmore showed early interest in unconventional art practice and anti-art after reading volumes on op art, pop art, and Sol LeWitt, whose work he homaged via a Mail Art network restricted to Australia (1977). His earliest in-print appearances, discounting some juvenilia published in his high school journal The Novocastrian (1976), included a Lovecraftian sonnet "Dream Landscape" and an attendance report on the Syncon 77 convention, published in Telmar (journal of the Macquarie University SF Association) 1, No 4 (1977), a zine issue also including fiction and art by Blackmore's later partner Margaret Curtis.

Beginning a 25-year career as a bookseller in 1978, he then worked in his spare time as an editorial assistant on The Australian Horror and Fantasy Magazine in the early 1980s; Blackmore went on to publish and co-edit its successor, Terror Australis magazine from 1987 to 1992.

In 1983, Blackmore met writer and poet (Danny) Charles Lovecraft through the letter column of Crypt of Cthulhu; Lovecraft would later found P'rea Press which published Blackmore's first poetry collection. He attended Syncon '83, a science fiction convention at which the Guests of Honour were Harlan Ellison and Van Ikin, and where he first met writer Terry Dowling. Blackmore learned the art of first edition book collecting through his association with fan, DUFF-winner and collector Keith Curtis. While attending Sydney University,(1983-84, where he majored in Semitic Studies), Blackmore came in contact with Don Boyd, then editor of (Australian) Futuristic Tales. Blackmore joined R. Alain Everts' 'Necronomicon' amateur press association, contributing several issues of his zines Red Viscous Madness, and Forbidden Dimensions, Nameless Dreams.

In 1984, Blackmore published bibliographies on Brian Lumley (Sydney: Dark Press) and H.P. Lovecraft (the latter in collaboration with S.T. Joshi)(West Warwick, RI: Necronomicon Press). He lent researcher Mike Ashley assistance with information for Frank H. Parnell's and Ashley's Monthly Terrors (Greenwood Press, 1985).

His first published story was "The Infestation", adapted for graphic form by Gavin O'Keefe and published in the fourth issue of Phantastique (1986), an Australian horror comic which attracted notoriety (questions were asked in Australian Federal Parliament) for being government-funded via an Arts Council grant while containing visceral images and story content.

His first publications outside of Australia included six Lovecraftian sonnets in R. Alain (Randy) Everts' magazine The Arkham Sampler (new series) 3, No 4 (1986) and another in Everts' Weird Tales tribute magazineEtchings and Odysseys No 10 (1987). Blackmore came to be a well-regarded Lovecraft scholar, carrying on correspondence with other Lovecraft fans in countries including USA, the UK, New Zealand, Japan, France, Germany, Italy, Poland and Russia. He was a member of the early Esoteric Order of Dagon under Mollie Werba. (He rejoined the EOD around 2000 under S.T. Joshi, contributing continuous quarterly zines such as Mantichore (65 issues to late 2025). His EOD zine The Unreverberate Blackness of the Abyss began publication in Feb 2026.)

He worked as a bookseller in Sydney for 25 years (1979–2004), primarily managing specialist science fiction & fantasy departments within larger bookstores such as Dymocks 1995-2000 and Collins Superstore Broadway (2001-2004). Authors hosted by Blackmore for events and signings at Dymocks George St included Storm Constantine, Harlan Ellison, Terry Dowling, Richard Harland, Douglas Adams, Terry Pratchett, Bill Congreve, Simon Brown, Kyla Ward, Robert Hood, Cat Sparks, and Bryce J. Stevens.

== Music ==
Blackmore had classical piano training, but his formative musical influences were The Beatles, Black Sabbath, Alice Cooper, David Bowie, Roxy Music, The Stooges, Genesis, Queen, Rick Wakeman, King Crimson, Television, XTC and such experimental bands as Henry Cow, Can and The Residents, along with Australian bands such as The Church, The Reels, The Models, Midnight Oil, MEO 245, Allniters, Outline and Voight 465. He had jammed with garage bands in his high school years in Newcastle, New South Wales including sessions at Newcastle Cathedral underground studio with Lindsay Walker (guitar), Paul Beal (drums) and Ashley Morris (bass).

On moving back to Sydney in 1977, Blackmore played synthesisers and drums (and occasionally sang) with Sydney New Wave band Worm Technology and other bands. From a mixture of influences including prog and experimental rock, pop and punk, Worm Technology evolved their unique sound while living together in an old schoolhouse in Rozelle in Sydney. Walker was a primary school friend of Blackmore's; meanwhile Walker had befriended guitarist and synth player (an early user of synthesisers, including the Steiner-Parker Synthacon) at high school.

=== Tiploid Grundy & the Rabid Slime Moulds ===
One of their earliest recordings (1977) includes a reggae version of "Kookaburra", played strictly for laughs. A cassette-only album of punk-style acoustic and vocal originals, "If You Don't Care for Your Scalp You Get Rabies" (1977) (its title a line uttered by Terry Jones in the Monty Python episode "Mr Neutron"), performed by Blackmore, Walker and Smith, was released under the band name Tiploid Grundy and the Rabid Slime Moulds. "Boils" was a parody of then-fashionable punk music by Blackmore, with a riff possibly cribbed from Paul McCartney's song "Smile Away". Simultaneously, with Smith, Blackmore initially concentrated on composing electronic music using sequencers, including the Robert Fripp and Brian Eno-influenced "Music for Bookshops" (1979), and a concept-cycle, recorded on reel-to-reel tape, called "The Guardian", based on a collaborative fantasy story written by the duo. When John Gardner (bass) joined, the band also released some cassette-only recordings including The Loungeroom Tapes and The Christmas Tapes.

=== Worm Technology ===
The band stabilised as a four-piece rock band with live drums as Worm Technology, though synth-based instrumentals such as "Africa" often featured in their sets. Blackmore initially played electric organ, string machine (a non-proprietary version of the Mellotron) and synthesiser, with Smith as drummer and synth programmer, but Blackmore often drummed when Smith was playing guitar or bass.

Worm Technology initially played covers by 1960s-1970s acts including Kevin Ayers, Lou Reed, The Troggs, Them, The Human Beinz, Modern Lovers, Ramones, Elvis Costello, The Jam and The Buzzcocks, and punkified medleys of old TV cartoon theme tunes such as Astroboy, Marine Boy and Gigantor. Worm Technology continued performing quirky originals.

Blackmore wrote many of the band's song lyrics, some in collaboration with vocalist Ian Walker (though Walker often wrote alone), and guitarist Greg Smith wrote much of the music, though Blackmore wrote both lyrics and music for some songs including the Buzzcocks-inspired "Apathy".

Worm Technology played gigs at various inner-city venues such as the Vulcan Hotel, Taverners Hill Hotel, The Rehearsal Room and the Sussex Hotel. They participated in a number of annual Strawberry Hills Hotel band competitions, along with such contemporary bands as The Hard-Ons. WT also undertook tours including the 'We Are Not the New Dylan Tour' (1980) in which they played obscure NSW country towns such as Fish River (Oberon) and The Lagoon; and the "Moo Cow Tour", in which they played in several Sydney milk-bars. The band also issued several numbers of their official fanzine, Prince the Wonder Dog which were given away at gigs.

Worm Technology released several cassette-only albums including In Your Loungeroom (1985) (engineered by the band's mixer/sound technician, Garry Ryan).

=== Koga Ninja ===
Worm Technology had several offshoot bands including Koga Ninja (named after characters from the 1960s TV show The Samurai), in which the band members (Blackmore, Smith and Elliott) dressed up as ninjas in costumes made by Smith. The band used synths and drum machines extensively. Koga Ninja released several cassette only live albums.

=== Astropop, Post-Mortem and White Stains ===
Blackmore largely abandoned music when Worm Technology broke up, to concentrate on his writing, although Astropop, a short-lived synthpop duo featuring Blackmore and Smith (extending Worm Technology's late emphasis on extended synthesiser-based numbers such as "Samurai") had some success playing electronica including Kraftwerk covers but never recorded. Blackmore drummed for Post-Mortem (1987), a band which featured Ian Walker from Worm Technology, bassist Brian Pember from Sydney Christian new wave band Crossroad/Surprise, and a guitarist only remembered as Colin. There are no extant recordings of Astropop or Post-Mortem. In the mid-1990s Blackmore recorded with the short-lived experimental group White Stains (1990) (named after Aleister Crowley's poetry volume of the same title, White Stains), with illustrator and viola-player Gavin O'Keefe. White Stains released a cassette single "Acid Bath" (Blackmore/O'Keefe") backed with "The Finger", a musical interpretation of William Burrough's story about a man who cuts off his own finger.

=== The Third Road ===
Blackmore resumed playing music semi-professionally in 2009 with the formation of the Illawarra-based 'popstalgia' trio The Third Road in which he plays five- and six-string bass and shares vocal duties with guitarist Margi Curtis and keyboards player Graham Wykes. The Third Road developed from the band Fedora, a trio featuring Curtis, Wykes and Bruce Greenfeld (later of Damned Fine Gentlemen). Blackmore joined on bass when Greenfeld left. The Third Road has played live in Wollongong at various events including the Thriving Illawarra Festival, Summer on the (Crown St) Mall, the annual National Disabilities Day gig organised by Essential Personnel (sometimes accompanied by singer/guitarist Al Morrison of Riogh), and at the annual Christmas party of the NSW Greens. They have also frequently performed Xmas gigs at Sydney's Royal Automobile Club of Australia. Since 2026, the members of the Third Road have joined forces with Colleen McGloin and Chris Willmore, playing folk music under the name of 'The New Road.'

== Later career ==
=== H.P. Lovecraft Centennial Conference ===
In 1990 Blackmore travelled via New York (where he met Peter H. Cannon, and interviewed Frank Belknap Long) to Providence for the H.P. Lovecraft Centennial Conference. As one of the Friends of Lovecraft group organised by S.T. Joshi, Jon Cooke and Will Murray, Blackmore contributed financially to erecting the memorial plaque in honour of Lovecraft which was erected outside the John Hay Library. In Providence, Blackmore met such figures as author Les Daniels, cartoonist and author Gahan Wilson, Marc A. Michaud (publisher of Necronomicon Press), critic Will Murray, editor David E. Schultz, Philip J. Rahman (copublisher of Fedogan and Bremer, with whom he made an agreement to act as F&B's Australian distributor), Italian scholar Giuseppe Lippi, critic Steven J. Mariconda, French scholar Jean-Luc Buard, Necronomicon Press illustrators Jason C. Eckhardt and Robert H. Knox, editor Robert M. Price, critic Paul Buhle, and German scholar Kalju Kirde. He attended the world premiere of Re-Animator. Blackmore also spent time with writers Dennis Etchison and William F. Nolan while in Los Angeles.

=== Terror Australis, the Gargoyle Club and the Sydney Futurian Society ===
With Christopher Sequeira and Bryce J. Stevens, Blackmore co-edited Terror Australis: The Australian Horror and Fantasy Magazine (1987–1992) and co-founded the Gargoyle Club: The Sydney Horror Writers and Artists Society, which included Sydney horror writers and artists including Gavin O'Keefe, underground graphic novelists Steve 'Carnage' Carter and Antoinette Rydyr; Rod Marsden, Don Boyd and others. The Gargoyle Club operated in Leichhardt, New South Wales and Petersham until 1992, after which it moved to venues in inner city Sydney and was subsequently joined by writers such as David Carroll and Kyla Ward. The club published two issues of their horror fiction magazine Cold Cuts co-edited by Antoinette Rydyr, Ron Clarke and Don Boyd, Art Director was Steve Carter.

Terror Australis the magazine was followed by the anthology Terror Australis: Best Australian Horror (1993), the first mass-market Australian horror anthology (edited by Blackmore alone). Leanne Frahm's story "Catalyst" from the anthology won the Ditmar Award for best Australian Short Fiction. Blackmore was an invited judge on the Aurealis Award in 1995 and on the George Turner (writer) Award in 1999.

In 1994–95, Blackmore was the Australian representative for the Horror Writers of America under the Presidency of Dennis Etchison. Blackmore featured as the character 'Sydney Deadlocke' in Christopher Sequeira's photostory "Deadlocke and Doc Martin: Occult Investigators" (Too Much Red Cordial magazine, Sydney University, 1995; revised reprint in Sequeira's comicbook Bold Action). 'Doc Martin' was played by Bryce Stevens.

Blackmore often hosted gatherings of the Futurian Society of Sydney (run by sf bibliographer/researcher and secondhand bookdealer Graham Stone) at his Leichardt home. Regular attendees included Kevin Dillon and David Ritchie. Blackmore also acquired the majority of his holdings of Weird Tales magazine via Stone over a period of around a decade.

=== Anarchism, Thee Temple ov Psychick Youth, Thoughtcrimes, the O.T.O. and Sydney Zeroist Alliance ===
In the early 1990s, owing to instinctive rejection of methods of social control, Blackmore became involved with the anarchist scene around Jura Books and the squatters collective Jellyhedz in Sydney, though his primary political interests lay in the Situationist International (especially the works of Guy Debord); and the ontological anarchism of Hakim Bey. The works of Colin Wilson became increasingly important to him (he interviewed Wilson in 1993) as did self-actualization and Timothy Leary's Eight Circuit Model of Consciousness as promulgated in Prometheus Rising by Robert Anton Wilson. Blackmore has an ongoing participatory involvement with psychogeography and the dérive. After discovering AK Press and Vague magazine, Blackmore co-founded Thoughtcrimes, an independent distributor of radical books and tapes which also operated culture-jamming and subvertising campaigns. Thoughtcrimes existed at roughly the same time as the American CrimethInc. began, with both drawing their names from the work of George Orwell. In this period Blackmore issued copyleft fanzines such as Antics: a Journal ov Anti-Control and The Possibility of Finding Such a Dog. Thoughtcrimes was succeeded by Blackmore's Sydney Zeroist Alliance project of the early 2000s, which was inspired by both the Situationists (specifically by the notion of the Situationist prank), by original Neoism and by post-situ Stewart Home's projects such as the Art Strike, Praxis and the Neoist Alliance, as well as by the occult/mathematical significance of zero.

Also in the early 1990s, following a renewed interest in ceremonial magic along with influence from the performance art, music and Mail Art of Genesis P. Orridge, Blackmore joined Thee Temple ov Psychick Youth via their Australian station, TOPY Chaos. Reading deeply in Aleister Crowley and other esoteric material, he accepted The Book of the Law, took the magical name Fr. LVX/NOX and was initiated into several degrees in Crowley's Ordo Templi Orientis. via their Sydney body, Oceania Oasis (later Oceania Lodge). He was ordained as a Deacon in the Ecclesia Gnostica Catholica and performed in several contemporary series of the Rites of Eleusis and in Crowley's mystery play The Ship. He has taken the role of Priest in Liber XV, The Gnostic Mass in the Illawarra and presented numerous workshops based on Crowley's magick.

=== Marriage, honours degree and aftermath ===
Blackmore married fellow bookseller and Neopagan Glayne Louise Vowles, with whom he had been in a relationship since 1994, in 1999 in a Hermetic ceremony which included readings from the Emerald Tablet of Hermes, Liber AL and The Black Book of Carmarthen. Certain items at the wedding were inscribed with the motto "In girum imus nocte et consumimur igni" ("We dance in the darkness and are consumed by fire"), from the title of the 1978 film by Guy Debord. However, the couple divorced in 2001. Blackmore then moved from Parramatta to Earlwood, with friends including Peter Wilson, vocalist/trumpeter for Sydney-based ska band Backy Skank. Vowles died in June 2009 aged 36. The Futurian Society of Sydney, to which she had belonged, observed a minute's silence at their meeting of 17 July 2009 for her, and for Locus editor Charles N. Brown, who had also recently died.

In 2001, Blackmore's comic-book story "The Gargoyle Club Gambit" (co-written with Christopher Sequeira) was published in Bold Action, a one-shot special.

=== Writing, editing, convention appearances ===
Blackmore has been a guest lecturer on science fiction, fantasy and horror for the University of Wollongong's Faculty of Creative Arts. He has guested as an expert on horror literature and film on TV programs in Australia including Ray Martin's Midday (television show), cable TV program The Graveyard Shift and Jennifer Byrne Presents and has been interviewed on Sydney's 2SER radio in the same capacity.

He became the second President of the Australian Horror Writers Association, serving from September 2010 until September 2011.

Blackmore is Official Editor (with Scott A. Shaeffer) of the Sword and Sorcery and Weird Fiction Terminus (SSFWT) amateur press association (founded by Benjamin Szumskyj) which has members in Australia, the US, the UK, Sweden and Finland. SSWFT reached its 50th mailing in August 2013. (Blackmore's own contributions can be found archived on www.scribd.com). Blackmore also contributes a regular zine to S.T. Joshi's "Esoteric Order of Dagon" Amateur Press Association. (Some issues can be found housed in Cuyler W. 'Ned' Brooks' fanzine archive. A comprehensive archive of EOD mailings can be found at the John Hay Library H.P. Lovecraft Collection).

He is a frequent panellist at science fiction conventions such as the Magic Casements Festival (Sydney, 2003). the annual Conflux convention in Canberra (where with Margi Curtis he often ran workshops on magick until 2015), and has been a panellist at Constantinople Australian National Science Fiction Convention(Melbourne, 1994), Freecon (Sydney, 2003), Aussiecon 4 (Melbourne, 2010) and Conflux 19: Brave New Worlds (Canberra, 2025).

Blackmore was heavily involved as a speaker and promoter in the June 2019 Australian speaking tour by Lovecraft scholar S. T. Joshi and lectured on Lovecraft alongside Joshi, Larry Sitsky and others at the ANU School of Music, Canberra and at the NSW Masonic Club in Sydney.

In 2020, Blackmore served as convenor and judge on the Poetry category of the Australian Shadows Awards.

In 2026, Blackmore became a board member of the Friends of August Derleth, and received investiture (as "Alan Upway") into the Praed Street Irregulars, the organisation devoted to celebrating Derleth's character Solar Pons. He is a member of The Friends of Arthur Machen.

== Award nominations ==
Year	Award	Work	Category	Result
2004	Ditmar Award	"Uncharted"	Best Novella	Nomination
2010	Ditmar Award	"Marvels and Horrors: Terry Dowling's Clowns at Midnight	William Atheling Jr. Award for Criticism	Nomination
2013	Ditmar Award	"Things Invisible: Human and Ab-Human in Two of Hodgson's Carnacki Tales".	William Atheling Jr. Award for Criticism	Nomination Ditmar Award results Entry 46
2013	Ditmar Award	"A Puppet's Parody of Joy": Puppets, Dolls and Mannikins as Diabolical Other in the Work of Ramsey Campbell	William Atheling Jr. Award for Criticism	Nomination Ditmar Award results Entry 46
2014	Rhysling Award	"The Last Dream" (for Ambrose Bierce)"	Best Long Poem	Nomination
2020	Australian Shadows Award	"The Tongueless Dead"	Best Horror Poem	Finalist
2020	Australian Shadows Award	"Sandalwood and Jade: The Weird & Fantastic verse of Lin Carter"	Rocky Wood Award for Non-fiction and Criticism	Finalist
2025	Ditmar Award	"A Dark Magician Meets a Victorian Sleuth"	William Atheling Jr. Award for Criticism	Finalist Ditmar Award results
2025	Ditmar Award	Nightmare Logic: Tales of the Macabre, Fantastic and Cthulhuesque (IFWG Publishing, 2024	Best Collected Work	Finalist Ditmar Award results

== Work ==
=== Collections ===
- Spores from Sharnoth and Other Madnesses. P'rea Press. 2008. ISBN 978-0-9804625-2-4. (verse) Covert art by Gavin O'Keefe
- Sharnoth's Spores and Other Seeds. Rainfall Books. 2010 [2008, Sydney: P'rea Press]. OCLC 781714598. (verse; variant edition of Spores from Sharnoth – omits some poems and adds others). Illustrated by Steve Lines.
- Horrors of Sherlock Holmes. R'lyeh Texts. 2017. ISBN 978-0-646-96897-1. (fiction). Cover art by Steve Lines. Illustrated by Philip Cornell.
- Azathoth and Other Horrors by Edward Pickman Derby. IFWG Australia. December 2023. ISBN 978-1-922856-44-9. (verse). Cover art by Luke Spooner.
- Nightmare Logic: Tales of the Macabre, the Fantastic and the Cthulhuesque. IFWG Australia. April 2024. ISBN 978-1-922856-74-6. (Ditmar Awards Finalist for best Collected Work, 2025.) (short fiction). Cover art by Luke Spooner.

=== Books ===
- Brian Lumley: A New Bibliography. Penrith NSW: Dark Press, 1984. San Bernardino, CA: Borgo Press, 1985.
- Terry Dowling: Virtuoso of the Fantastic. (R'lyeh Texts, Apr 2005).

=== Record Album Liner Notes ===
- Aleister Crowley. At the Fork of the Roads. Cadabra Records, March 2022. 7-inch vinyl recording on various colours of vinyl (total 500 copies). Narrated by Laurance Harvey, score by Chris Bozzone. Blackmore's liner notes essay as by Frater HekAL
- Edogawa Rampo The Red Chamber. Cadabra Records, September 2023. LP vinyl recording. Narrated by Laurance Harvey, score by Chris Bozzone.

=== As editor ===
- Terror Australis: The Australian Horror & Fantasy Magazine (co-edited with Bryce J. Stevens and Chris G.C. Sequeira) (1988–1992): Nos. 1, 2, 3.
- Terror Australis: The Best of Australian Horror. Hodder & Stoughton, 1993. ISBN 978-0-340-58455-2
- Antics: A Personal Journal ov Anti-Control.(1993, 3 issues)
- Mythopoeia: The Newsletter of Dymocks Science Fiction & Fantasy (co-edited with Glayne Louise) (1995–97)
- Studies in Australian Weird Fiction (co-edited with Benjamin J. Szumskyj, Phillip A. Ellis and James Doig) (2008– ) Issues 1–3 published by Equilibrium Books, W.A. Issue 4 published by Borgo Press.
- And Then I Woke Up: A Zine About Dreams (co-edited with Chris Postill and Miriam Wells) (Wollongong NSW: Oneiros Dreamzine Collective, Faculty of Creative Arts, University of Wollongong, Oct 2007). Illustrated by Leigh Blackmore.
- Midnight Echo, No. 5. Australian Horror Writers Association (2011)
- Tarot of the Time Being by Steve Kilbey and K. P. Buk (White River Junction, VT: Batten Down the Hatches, 2015). Co-edited by Blackmore with Sigrid Lium and Steven J. Kilbey, for trade edition (ISBN 978-1-4951-3981-9, images in black and white). Co-edited by Blackmore with Mark E. Merrill and Steven J. Kilbey, for Special Limited Edition (ISBN 978-1-4951-5941-1, images in colour, Foreword by Donnette Thayer).

=== Selected critical writings and bibliographies ===
- Blackmore, Leigh (1983). "Middle-Earth, Narnia and Lovecraft's Dream-World". Crypt of Cthulhu. No. 2:5 (No. 13).
- Blackmore, Leigh (August 1984). "Leon Stone: Amateur Journalist and Pioneer Lovecraft Collector". Red Viscous Madness. No. 1, No 1). Reprint in The Fossil 105:3 No, 340, (April 2009).
- Blackmore, Leigh (1984). Brian Lumley: A New Bibliography. Sydney: Dark Press. Brian Lumley: A New Bibliography. San Bernardino, CA: Borgo Press. 1986. ISBN 978-0-89370-541-1.
- Joshi, S. T.; Blackmore, Leigh (1985). H. P. Lovecraft and Lovecraft Criticism: An Annotated Bibliography: Supplement 1980-1984. West Warwick, RI: Necronomicon Press. ISBN 978-0-940884-03-8.
- Blackmore, Leigh (1985). "Hermetic Horrors: Weird Fiction Writers and the Hermetic Order of the Golden Dawn". Shadowplay. No. 9.
- Blackmore, Leigh (1990). "Introduction". In Stevens, Bryce (ed.). The Australian H.P. Lovecraft Centenary Calendar 1990–1991. Sydney: Terror Australis.
- Blackmore, Leigh (1991). "Under the Pyramids: On Lovecraft and Houdini". EOD. No. 4–5.
- Blackmore, Leigh (March 1995). "Writer's Bloch: A Brief Tribute to the Author of Psycho (novel)". Tabula Rasa. No. 7.
- Blackmore, Leigh (1996). Harlan Ellison, Terry Dowling, Jack Dann: A Bibliographic Checklist. Sydney: R'lyeh Texts. OCLC 865165390.
- Blackmore, Leigh (December 1999). "Don Boyd (1945–1999): An Appreciation". Masque Noir. No. 4.
- Blackmore, Leigh (October 2001). "Sherlock Holmes Meets Cthulhu: With Particular Reference to the Influence of The Hound of the Baskervilles on Lovecraft's "The Hound" With a Brief Excursus upon Solar Pons: A Paper for the Sydney Passengers Sherlock Holmes Society's Centenary Celebration of The Hound of the Baskervilles, presented at Bishopthorpe Manor, NSW". Mantichore. Vol. 1, no. 3. Revised reprint in The Passenger's Log: Journal of the Sydney Passengers (Sherlock Holmes Society), Vol 19, Nos 3 &4 (2016). Reprinted in The Pontine Dossier (New Millenium edition) No 6 (2025).
- Blackmore, Leigh.(2003) "Time and Memory: An Interview with Jack Dann.
- Blackmore, Leigh (2005). "Terry Dowling, Robert Hood, and Rick Kennett". In Joshi, S. T. (ed.). Supernatural Literature of the World: An Encyclopedia. Westport, CT: Greenwood Press. ISBN 978-0-313-32774-2.
- Blackmore, Leigh (January 2006). Ellis, Phillip A. (ed.). "'Ranked With the Immortals': George Sterling and Clark Ashton Smith". Calenture. 1 (2).
- Blackmore, Leigh (March 2006). "The Message of Thuba-Mleen: Lord Dunsany's Influence on Aleister Crowley". Mantichore. 1 (2).
- Blackmore, Leigh (December 2007). "Paganism in Poetry: Kenneth Slessor's "Pan at Lane Cove"". Mantichore (2:4 (8)).
- Blackmore, Leigh (2008). "A Semiotic Reading of Edgar Allan Poe's The Purloined Letter". Mantichore (3:2 (10)).
- Blackmore, Leigh (2008). "A Chronological Index to the Australian Horror Anthologies". Mantichore (3:3 (11)).
- Blackmore, Leigh (Winter 2008 – Spring 2009). Joshi, S. T. (ed.). "'Undoing the Mechanisms': Genre Expectation, Subversion and Anti-Consolation in the Kefahuchi Tract Novels of M. John Harrison". Studies in the Fantastic (2). ISSN 1942-7190.
- Blackmore, Leigh (August 2009). "Some Notes on Lovecraft's 'The Transition of Juan Romero'". Lovecraft Annual (3).
- Blackmore, Leigh (2009). "Hair in Magick and Occultism". In Bocallate, Suzanne (ed.). Hair. Bocalatte Books.
- Blackmore, Leigh (2009). "The Twisted World Inside Our Skulls: The 1950s Crime and Suspense Novels of Robert Bloch". In Szumskyj, Benjamin (ed.). The Man Who Collected Psychos: Critical Essays on Robert Bloch. McFarland. ISBN 978-0-7864-4208-9.
- Blackmore, Leigh (2009). "Deep in the Reality Crisis: Individuation, 'Mytho-Realism' and Surrealistic Traces in Terry Dowling's Tom Rynosseros Cycle". Critical Component, Honours Thesis for Bachelor Creative Arts (Writing), University of Wollongong. Faculty of Creative Arts, University of Wollongong (BCA Honours thesis – Critical) – via Academia. Reprint in Science Fiction: A Review of Speculative Literature, Volume 20, Numbers 1-2, Whole Numbers 51-52 Special Double Issue: the Early Work of Terry Dowling (2019).
- Blackmore, Leigh (2011). "Marvels and Horrors: Terry Dowling's Clowns at Midnight". In Olson, Danel (ed.). 21st Century Gothic. Scarecrow Press. Reprinted in Australian Studies in Weird Fiction, No. 4 (Winter 2011).
- Blackmore, Leigh (2013). ""A Puppet's Parody of Joy": Puppets, Dolls and Mannikins as Diabolical Other in the Work of Ramsey Campbell". In Crawford, Gary W. (ed.). Ramsey Campbell: Critical Essays on the Modern Master of Horror. Scarecrow Press. Nominated for the William Atheling Jr. Award for Criticism.
- Blackmore, Leigh (August 2013). Sam Gafford (ed.). "Things Invisible: Human and Ab-Human in Two of Hodgson's Carnacki Tales". Sargasso: The Journal of William Hope Hodgson Studies. No. 1.| Reprint in Gafford, Sam and S.T. Joshi (eds) William Hope Hodgson: Voices from the Borderland: Seven Decades of Criticism on the Master of Cosmic Horror NY: Hippocampus Press, 2014. Nominated for the William Atheling Jr. Award for Criticism.
- Blackmore, Leigh (2014). S. T. Joshi (ed.). "Driven to Madness with Fright: The Influence of Poe's "Ulalume" on Lovecraft's "Nemesis"". Lovecraft Annual. No. 8. ISSN 1935-6102.
- Blackmore, Leigh (Spring 2015). "Figures in a Nightmare: The Poetry of Leah Bodine Drake Part 1". Spectral Realms (2). Hippocampus Press.
- Blackmore, Leigh (Summer 2015). "Figures in a Nightmare: The Poetry of Leah Bodine Drake Part 2". Spectral Realms (3). Hippocampus Press.
- Blackmore, Leigh (February 2016). "A Look at Weird Tales Magazine-Based Anthologies". Mantichore (11:1 (37)).
- Blackmore, Leigh (May 2016). "A Look at Books and Sources About Weird Tales Magazine". Mantichore (11:2 (38)).
- Blackmore, Leigh (September 2016). "Fritz Leiber; Ramsey Campbell; "Stories by Women"". In Pulliam, June; Tony Fonseca (eds.). Ghosts in Popular Culture and Legend. Santa Barbara, CA: ABC-Clio. ISBN 978-1-4408-3490-5.
- Blackmore, Leigh (Fall 2016). Sam Gafford (ed.). "Ye Hogge: Liminality and the Motif of the Monstrous Pig in Hodgson's "The Hog" and The House on the Borderland". Sargasso: The Journal of William Hope Hodgson Studies (3).
- Blackmore, Leigh (Winter 2017). S. T. Joshi (ed.). "In Pursuit of the Transcendent: The Weird Verse of Walter de la Mare". Spectral Realms (6).
- Blackmore, Leigh (July 2019). Blu Gilland (ed.). "A Chip Off the Old Bloch: An Interview with Robert Bloch's Daughter Sally Francy". Cemetery Dance (77).. Unexpurgated version at:
- Blackmore, Leigh (Fall 2020). Alex Houstoun and Michael J. Abolafia (ed.). "Sandalwood and Jade: The Weird and Fantastic Verse of Linwood Vrooman Carter". Dead Reckonings (28).
- Blackmore, Leigh (February 2021). "Who the Hell Was Mearl Prout?". Mantichore (15:1 (54)). Reprint in Lovecraft Annual, No 15 (2021).
- Blackmore, Leigh (July 2023). "Richard L. Tierney: An Appreciation". In Lovecraft, Charles (ed.). Savage Menace and Other Poems (expanded ed.). Sydney: P'rea Press.
- Blackmore, Leigh (2025). "Ecstasies and Odysseys: The Weird Poetry of Donald Wandrei". In Phillip A. Ellis (ed.). Poets of the Lovecraft Circle. Hippocampus Press.
- Blackmore, Leigh (2026). "The Seven Passengers". In Belanger, Derrick (ed.). The Essential Solar Pons: Classic Adventures of the Sherlock Holmes of Praed Street with commentaries. Manchester, NH: Belanger Books. ISBN 979-8-185-72330-2.

=== Fiction ===
- Blackmore, Leigh (1986). "The Infestation". Phantastique. (Script by Blackmore based on his short story; art by Gavin O'Keefe)
- Blackmore, Leigh; Chris G.C. Sequeira (1990). "The Gargoyle Club Gambit". Pulse of Darkness. No. 4.. Reprint in Too Much Red Cordial zine (Sydney University) (date unknown). Reprint in Bold Action comic number 1 (Sequence Comics, 2002).
- Blackmore, Leigh (1993). "The Hourglass". In Blackmore, Leigh (ed.). Terror Australis: The Best of Australian Horror. Hodder & Stoughton. ISBN 978-0-340-58455-2.
- Blackmore, Leigh (June 1995). "The Guardian". Avatar. No. 3.
- Blackmore, Leigh (June 1995). "The Last Town". Avatar. No. 3.
- Blackmore, Leigh (June 1995). "The Sacrifice". Avatar. No. 3.
- Blackmore, Leigh; Bryce J. Stevens (1998). "This Story Has No Tuttle". Choking Dog Gazette. No. 3.
- Blackmore, Leigh (2002). "Dr. Nadurnian's Golem". In Cat Sparks (ed.). Agog! Fantastic Fiction. Wollongong: Agog! Press. ISBN 0-9580567-0-6.
- Blackmore, Leigh (2003). "Uncharted". In Cat Sparks (ed.). Agog! Terrific Tales. Wollongong: Agog! Press. ISBN 0-9580567-2-2.
- Blackmore, Leigh (March 2006). "Soul Food". Mantichore. Vol. 1, no. 2.. A Deadlocke and Doc Marten story.
- Blackmore, Leigh (May 2006). "Wave". Micro. No. 1.
- Blackmore, Leigh (September 2006). "A Myriad of Stars". Mantichore. Vol. 1, no. 4.. Science fiction story.
- Blackmore, Leigh (October 2006). "Imago". Tertangala.
- Blackmore, Leigh (December 2006). "Water Runs Uphill". Mantichore. Vol. 2, no. 1. Reprint in Aurealis number 38/39 (September 2007)
- Blackmore, Leigh (2007). "The Return of Zoth-Ommog". In Rob Hood; Robin Pen (eds.). Daikaiju 3! Giant Monsters vs the World. Wollongong: Agog! Press. ISBN 978-0-8095-7233-5.
- Blackmore, Leigh (October 2007). "Dream Street". And then I Woke Up!.
- Blackmore, Leigh (October 2008). "Leaving Town". Tide. No. 5.
- Blackmore, Leigh (2009). "The Return of Zoth-Ommog". In Henrik Harksen (ed.). Eldritch Horrors: Dark Tales. Denmark: Henrik Harksen productions.
- Blackmore, Leigh (2009). "The Roomer". The Stack.
- Blackmore, Leigh (2009). "Exalted Are the Forces of Darkness". In J. R. Campbell; Charles Prepolec (eds.). Gaslight Grotesque: Nightmare Tales of Sherlock Holmes. Edge Publishing. ISBN 978-1-894063-31-9. See Gaslight series.
- Blackmore, Leigh (2014). "The Arcana of Death". Strange Detective Stories. No. 4.
- Blackmore, Leigh (April 2015). "The Adventure of the Metaphysics of Mania". Mantichore. Vol. 10, no. 1.
- Blackmore, Leigh (May 2015). "The Last Town". Aurora Borealis. No. 37.
- Blackmore, Leigh (2018). "Cemetery Rose". In Rebecca Lang (ed.). Dark Spirits. Sydney: Strange Nation.
- Blackmore, Leigh (2021). "The Return of Zoth-Ommog". In Robert M. Price (ed.). Secret Asia's Blackest Heart. Sweden: Timaios Press.

=== Poetry ===
Blackmore's weird verse (primarily formalist in style) has appeared variously in And Then I Woke Up!, Arkham Sampler (The Strange Co), Avallaunius: The Journal of the Arthur Machen Society, Beastly (1990s journal of the Ordo Templi Orientis in Australia), Cyaegha, Chris Masters' EOD, The Eldritch Dark,, Etchings & Odysseys (The Strange Co), Melaleuca, Midnight Echo, New Lovecraft Collector (Necronomicon Press), Penumbra, Shoggoth, The Small Tapestry (P.A.N. Inc), Spectral Realms, Strange Sorcery (Rainfall Books), Telmar , and Weird Fiction Review.

Much of Blackmore's weird poetry to 2008 is collected in his first weird verse collection Spores from Sharnoth & Other Madnesses, with a foreword by S.T. Joshi. The US journal Dead Reckonings declared that the collection "at once establishes Blackmore as one of the leading weird poets of our time." A variant edition of this title, omitting the introduction and P'rea Press editors' foreword, and with some poems excluded and others added, under the title Sharnoth's Spores & Other Seeds, was published by Rainfall Books in 2010. In 2020, the title poem of the collection received film treatment by Swedish animator Richard Svensson and can be viewed on Youtube .

General poetry has appeared in Melaleuca, Tertangala, and at Australian Reader and Pool online. Blackmore has read his poetry live at various venues in NSW including Live Poets at Don Bank (North Sydney), Yours and Owls Café (Wollongong), Jane's (Wollongong) and Philanthropy Tribe Book Cafe (Wollongong). Blackmore has also recorded readings of many of the poems of Clark Ashton Smith, e.g. "Chant to Sirius".

Since 2010, Blackmore's poetry has appeared in anthologies and magazines including:

- Charles Lovecraft (ed) Avatars of Wizardry (Sydney: P'rea Press, 2012)
- S.T. Joshi and Stefan Dziemianowicz (eds) Dreams of Fear: Poetry of Terror and the Supernatural (NY: Hippocampus Press, 2013)
- Elizabeth R. McClellan & Ashley Brown (eds) The 2014 Rhysling Poetry Anthology: The Best Science Fiction, Fantasy and Horror Poetry of 2013 (SFPA, 2014).
- Graham Phillips (ed) Cyaegha No 13 (Spring 2015).
- Gutiérrez, Juan Julio (ed) Beyond the Cosmic Veil (Horrified Press/Barbed Wire Butterfly Press, 2015).
- Adam Joffrain (ed) Nightgaunt No 2 (July 2015) [France; collaboration-translation with Adam Joffrain].
- Steve Lines (ed) Hallowe'en Howlings. (Calne, Wiltshire: Rainfall Books (UK), Oct 2015).
- Danny Gardner (ed) Can I Tell You a Secret?: Live Poets at Don Bank's 25th Anniversary Anthology. (Canberra: Ginninderra Press, Nov 2015.)
- John T. Allen (ed) Songs of the Shattered World: The Broken Hymns of Hastur. (Ticketyboo Press/Green Sun Press [Createspace], Feb 2016)
- Sam Gafford (ed) Sargasso: The Journal of William Hope Hodgson Studies 3 (2016)
- Glynn Barrass and Frederick J. Mayer (eds). Anno Klarkash-ton. (Calne, Wiltshire: Rainfall Books, 2017).
- Joshi, S.T. (ed) Penumbra No 1 (2020) and No 2 (2021) (NY: Hippocampus Press)
- Frank Coffman (ed) Speculations III: Poetry from the Weird Poets Society (Mind's Eye Press, 2021)
- Guarelli, Pietro (ed). Zothique Anno V, No 11 (2022) (in English and Italian)
- Calhoun, Pat (ed). Weird and Wondrous: An Anthology of Fantasy Poetry (P'rea Press, 2023)
- S.T. Joshi (ed). For the Outsider: Poems About H. P. Lovecraft (NY: Hippocampus Press, July 2023). Includes four poems by Blackmore in tribute to Lovecraft.

Blackmore has collaborated on poems with US poets Richard L. Tierney, Fred Phillips (in English and Italian translation), K.A. Opperman and Ann K. Schwader; with French poet Adam Joffrain; and with Australian poet Charles Lovecraft. His poem "The Last Dream" was a nominee for Best Long Poem in the 2014 annual Rhysling Award.

In Oct 2021, three of Blackmore's weird poems were featured as part of a series of Hallowe'en recorded poetry readings hosted on Facebook by fellow weird poet Scott Couturier. Australian writer Chuck McKenzie has read a number of Blackmore's poems on his podcast.

=== Reviews, radio and other works ===
Blackmore regularly reviewed horror fiction for over a decade for US critical journal Dead Reckonings. When this journal ceased in 2025, Blackmore began reviewing horror for Penumbra journal. He also reviews horror for Bruce Gillespie's SF Commentary.

His past review work of horror and fantasy fiction includes contributions to AsIF.com, Galaxy Newsletter, Lovecraft Annual, OzHorrorscope (online blog reviews), Prohibited Matter (column – "The State of the Nightmare"), Science Fiction (column – "Darkside"), Shoggoth, Skinned Alive, Spectral Realms, and the Sydney Morning Herald.

Blackmore's story "The Infestation" was read live to air by Steven Paulsen on Rick Kennett's 3CR and 3MDR Community radio guest shows "Pilots of the Unknown".

His story "Cemetery Rose" was read by the author and dramatized with sound effects for the Writing Show's Six Days of Hallowe'en podcast (cohosted by Australian Horror Writers Association) in 2006. An interview with Blackmore conducted by Writing Show host Paula Berenstein was broadcast concurrently.

His radio play Calling Water was broadcast in late 2008 on ABC Radio National Airplay.

His collage artwork, which is influenced by the Situationist technique of detournement, has been exhibited at the First Australasian Thelemic Conference (Sydney, 1994) and published in various issues of Tertangala magazine. See also ''And Then I Woke Up" (2007) under 'As Editor' section above.

== See also ==
- List of horror fiction authors
