= Terror Australis: The Best of Australian Horror =

First edition Cover photo by Grant V. Faint; Terror Australis logo by Vicki Adams

Terror Australis: The Best of Australian Horror (Sydney: Coronet, 1993) was Australia's first original mass-market horror anthology for adults. It was edited by Leigh Blackmore. (It is technically preceded by Bill Congreve's anthology Intimate Armageddons (MirrorDanse Books, 1992), although that volume did not have mass market distribution).

Terror Australis the anthology grew from the magazine Terror Australis and drew on the talents of horror writers centred on Sydney's Gargoyle Club Horror Writers and Artists' Society; however it also featured many of Australia's big-name sf and horror writers. Most contributions were original, but a few were reprints, mainly from the Australian small press. The quantity of internal artwork featured, designed to showcase horror work in art as well as fiction, made it something of an innovation amongst paperbacks of the time in Australia.

A companion volume of sf stories, Mortal Fire: Best Australian SF, edited by Terry Dowling and Van Ikin, was issued by Coronet the same year.

Launches for the anthology were held at Sydney's Galaxy Bookshop and Melbourne's Minotaur Books.

Robert Bloch, author of Psycho, called the volume "a landmark - a monument to the genre". Seven of the included stories have since been reprinted, some several times (see below).

Leanne Frahm's story from the anthology won the Ditmar Award for Best Australian Short Fiction.

There was to have been a follow-up volume, but Hodder & Stoughton (Coronet) were bought out by UK publisher Headline to form Hodder Headline, and the new owners did not take up the option for a continuing series.

== Contents ==
- Leanne Frahm, "Catalyst." Art by Gavin O'Keefe. (Winner, Ditmar Award for Best Short Fiction, 1994).
- Terry Dowling, "The Daemon Street Ghost-Trap". This story has been reprinted multiple times including in Datlow and Windling (eds) Year's Best Fantasy and Horror Vol 7 (1994), in Dowling's collection An Intimate Knowledge of the Night, in Ken Gelder (ed), The Oxford Book of Australian Ghost Stories (1997), and in Dowling's collections Basic Black: Tales of Appropriate Fear (Cemetery Dance, 1996) and Cemetery Dance Select: Terry Dowling (2015 e-book)
- Paul Lindsey, "The Wolves Are Running." First published in The Melbourne Report. (no further data)
- Sharon A. Hansen, "Chameleon"
- Eddie van Helden, "Mabuza's Plum". First published in EOD 7 (1992).
- Dr John Hugoe-Matthews, "Hantu-Rimba"
- Louise M. Steer, "Losing Faith"
- Robert Hood, "Openings." Art by Steve 'Carnage' Carter. Collected in Hood's Peripheral Visions: The Collected Ghost Stories edited by Gerry Huntman, (IFWG Australia Publishing, 2015).
- Guy Boothby, "Remorseless Vengeance." Art by Terry Austin. First published in Uncle Joe's Legacy – and Other Stories (London:F. V. White, 1902)
- Bryce J. Stevens, "A Gift from Gehenna." Art by Kurt Stone.
- Kendall Hoffmann, "Johnny Twofeller." Art by Kurt Stone.
- Steven Paulsen, "In the Light of the Lamp". Reprinted in Robert M. Price, ed, The Cthulhu Cycle: Thirteen Tentacles of Terror (Chaosium, 1996)
- Chris G.C. Sequeira, "Feeling Empty". Art by Philip Cornell
- Ann C. Whitehead, "The Nicholas Vine"
- Geoff O'Callaghan, "The Keeper." Art by Antoinette Rydyr.
- Rick Kennett, "Out of the Storm." Art by Neil Walpole. First published in Chills (Spring 1992). An audio production can be heard at:
- Sean Williams, "Twist of the Knife." Art by Antoinette Rydyr. First published in Esoteric Order Of Dagon Magazine 5, (Dec 1991). The reprint in Terror Australis anthology is a revised version. Reprint in Tenebre, November 1999 (French translation).
- Sheila Hatherley, "The Hut."
- Leigh Blackmore, "The Hourglass". Art by Gavin L. O’Keefe Collected in Blackmore's Nightmare Logic: Tales of the Macabre, the Fantastic, and the Cthuluesque. (IFGW Publishing, 2024).
- Michael Bryant, "A Dangerous Thing"
- Sue Isle, "Makeover." Art by Neil Walpole.
- Dirk Strasser, "Dear Reader". Collected in Strasser's Stories of the Sand (Satalyte Publishing, 2014)
- Eddie van Helden, "The Vivisector." First published in Strikeout (no further data)
- Cherry Wilder, "Anzac Day". Art by Gavin O'Keefe. First published in Lisa Tuttle, ed Skin of the Soul: New Horror Stories by Women Women's Press, 1990).
- Bill Congreve, "Red Ambrosia." Collected in Congreve's Epiphanies of Blood: Tales of Desperation and Thirst (MirrorDanse, 1998)
- Stephen Dedman, "Heir of the Wolf". This story has been twice reprinted - in 'Tales of the Unanticipated (Fall/Winter/Spring 1997/98) and in the author's collection Never Seen by Waking Eyes (Infrapress, 2005)
- Greg Egan, "Neighbourhood Watch". Art by Steve 'Carnage' Carter (uncredited at p. 331) First published in Aphelion (Summer 1986/87) and in Karl Edward Wagner (ed). The Year's Best Horror Stories XVI (DAW Books, 1988). Available as digital download on Pseudopod (No. 340, June 2013, ed. Shawn Garrett).
- Bill Fewer, "Denials." First published in Brave New Words. (no further data).
