= Terror Australis =

Australian horror magazine (1988–1992)

- Editors: Leigh Blackmore, Christopher Sequeira and Bryce J. Stevens
- Frequency: irregular (3 issues 1988-1992)
- Publisher: R'lyeh Texts
- Founded: 1988
- Final issue: 1992
- Company: R'lyeh Texts
- Country: Australia
- Based in: Sydney
- Language: English

Terror Australis: the Australian Horror and Fantasy Magazine (1988–1992) was Australia's first mass market horror magazine. It succeeded the Australian Horror and Fantasy Magazine (1984–87) edited by Barry Radburn (who has gone on to publish novels as B. Michael Radburn) The Australian Horror and Fantasy Magazine#Barry Radburn (B. Michael Radburn) and Stephen Studach. AH&FM was the first semi-professional magazine of its kind in Australia to pay authors. After working on the production crew of AH&FM, when Radburn eventually suspended publication, Leigh Blackmore took over the subscription base and with co-editors Chris G.C. Sequeira and Bryce J. Stevens founded Terror Australis. Kevin Dillon, a longtime Australian sf fan who had belonged to the Australian Futurians had the role of 'Special Consultant' for financial support and proofreading work on the magazine.

"Australia has never produced a straight fantasy magazine, though in 1970 Sword and Sorcery, a putative companion to Ronald E Graham's Vision of Tomorrow, reached dummy stage before a poor financial deal killed it. Void (5 issues 1975-1977), an sf magazine, published occasional fantasy. Not until The Australian Horror and Fantasy Magazine (5 issues Summer 1984-Fall 1985) did a specialist publication emerge in the small-press field, though it concentrated mostly on horror, in imitation of Weird Tales. The same applied to Terror Australis (3 issues Fall 1988-Summer 1992), which emphasized graphic visceral horror."

"Terror Australis was launched in autumn 1988 and was more ambitious than AH&FM. The first issue, printed in Sydney, was a mammoth 170 pages and its fiction content was almost entirely Australian.

The second issue, printed privately on a printing press owned by artist Kurt Stone, followed about July 1990, almost two years after the first, and despite its less than satisfactory physical appearance, was well received. Issue 2 was the only issue distributed to newsagents, via Wrapaway Distribution.

The third issue, published in February 1992, Issue 3 was themed as a Jack the Ripper special and contained stories of 'Ripperiana' together with media guides and non-fiction bibliographies around Ripper-based material. . Issue 3 overcame all the production problems evident with the earlier issues. It was professionally typeset by a Queensland printer, printed on quality paper and perfect bound with a glossy cover. It was also the final issue. While Terror Australis was primarily a horror magazine, it published a number of well-regarded dark fantasy stories, including work by Rick Kennett, Frances Burke, Graeme Parsons and Steven Paulsen."

== Content ==
In addition to fiction, some of which was by writers best known for their mainstream work (such as Beth Yahp and Coral Hull), each issue featured non-fiction columns including "The Black Stump" (editorial by Leigh Blackmore); "In the Bad Books" (horror reviews by Blackmore, 'David Kuraria' (Bryce J. Stevens) and 'Carl Uda' (Christopher Sequeira); "Out of Space and Time" (book releases in brief); "Views from Emerald City" (Fantasy Reviews by Phillip Knowles); "Dark Enchantments" (Horror and Fantasy Magazines); "Post-Mortem" (readers' letter column) and "The Chaos Club" (contributor biographies).

Author Maurice Xanthos was the only author to have a story selected for each of the three issues.

The column "Personal Terrors" by Christopher Sequeira appeared only in Issue 1, and that by Bryce Stevens, "Every Time the Candle Burns", in Issues 1 and 3 only. Mark Morrison's "Keeping Time" (column on horror gaming) appeared only in Issues 1 and 3. (Morrison notably went on to write various roleplaying game scenarios for Chaosium, including one as collaboration with Thomas Ligotti, "In a City of Bells and Towers" (based on Ligotti's story "The Journal of J.P. Drapeau") for the Horror on the Oriental Express gaming module for the 5th edition of Call of Cthulhu (1991)). Keith Curtis 's column "Bibliocide" (horror and true crime reviews) appeared only in Issue 1.

The magazine also featured interviews with several international writers such as Clive Barker and Whitley Strieber, and stories by such international writers as Ramsey Campbell, Brian Lumley and Nicholas Royle.

A wide range of Australian genre artists also featured in its pages. These included Gavin O'Keefe, Steve 'Carnage' Carter, Tony Baron, Karen Ravenlore, Brad Ellis, Mike McGann, Rama Mithiran, Physch, David Richardson, Jon Sequeira, Bryce J. Stevens, Kurt Stone, Catherine Waters, Philip Cornell, Igor Spajic, Neil Walpole, Kerry Kennedy and Bodine Amerikah. Ravenlore and Mithiran had previously had artwork featured in Terror Australis' predecessor, The Australian Horror and Fantasy Magazine.

== Influence ==
Although its circulation was comparatively small, the magazine had a significant impact on the horror scene in Australia in the late eighties and early nineties. Issue 3 was reviewed outside Australia by Don D'Ammassa (Science Fiction Chronicle, Nov 1992). The success of Terror Australis magazine led directly to the publication of the mass-market horror anthology Terror Australis: Best Australian Horror (edited by Blackmore alone) (Hodder & Stoughton, 1993), a companion volume to Terry Dowling and Van Ikin's Mortal Fire: Best Australian SF (Hodder & Stoughton, 1993). Launches for the anthology were held at Sydney's Galaxy Bookshop and Melbourne's Minotaur Books.

Author Robert Bloch said Terror Australis: Best Aust Australian Horror was 'a landmark venture - a testament to the advancement of the genre'.

Author Leanne Frahm's story "Catalyst" from the volume won the Ditmar Award for Best Australian Short Fiction, 1993. Russell Blackford, Van Ikin & Sean McMullen (eds).

Although the Australian magazines Eidolon and Aurealis frequently published horror stories along with their sf and fantasy contents, Terror Australis remained Australia's only professional all-horror magazine until the advent of the Australian Horror Writers Association magazine Midnight Echo in the 21st century.

== Issues ==
- 1, No 1 (Autumn 1988) Cover art by Gavin O'Keefe
- 1, No 2 (Winter 1988) Cover art by Kurt Stone.

Contents: Fiction and Verse

- "The Mistake" by Graeme Parsons
- "Castle Elacteu" by S.R. Schultz
- "He Had a Soul" (verse) by 'Carl Uda' (Chris G. C. Sequeira)
- "How Long Will It Be" by Sheila Morehead
- "Phantom of the Night" by Jonathan Krause
- "Am I Not Asleep?" (verse) by Shane Doheny
- "Willie's Struggle" by Kurt von Trojan
- "Strange Fruit" by Rick Kennett
- "Guitar Man" by Maurice Xanthos
- "Suck Your Guts Out" (verse) by Coral Hull (as by 'Coral E. Hull')
- "The Gift" by Frances Burke
- "Old Wood" by Steven Paulsen
- 2, No 1 (whole number 3) (Summer 1992): The Jack the Ripper special Cover art by Phillip Cornell.

Gregory Cheeseman's essay "Portrait of the Ripper" deals with the painter Walter Richard Sickert and the Ripper crimes.

== See also ==
- Science fiction magazine
- Fantasy fiction magazine
- Horror fiction magazine
