= Christopher Sequeira =

Australian editor, writer and artist

- Born: Sydney, Australia
- Occupations: Writer, comics scriptwriter, film scriptwriter
- Writing career
- Pen name: Chris G.C. Sequeira; Christopher G.C. Sequeira; C.G.C. Sequeira; Carl Uda
- Genres: Dark fantasy, crime
- Notable work: "His Last Arrow"

Christopher Sequeira (also published as Chris G.C. Sequeira, Christopher G.C. Sequeira, C.G.C. Sequeira) is a Sydney-based Australian editor, writer and artist who works predominantly in the speculative fiction (horror, fantasy, science fiction, super-hero) and mystery realms (especially Sherlock Holmes material. His work has been published in Australia, the UK, the USA and Canada. He has also been a radio host and film-maker. In the early 2000s, Sequeira became the Chief Editor of IPI Comics, a line of comics and graphic novels associated with Australia's IFWG Publishing.

== Writing Career ==
His published work includes poetry, prose (especially short fiction), and comic-book scripts. Sequeira's creator-owned work includes the Sherlock Holmes: Dark Detective series (with co-creators Dave Elsey and Philip Cornell), Pulse of Darkness, Rattlebone: The Pulp-Faced Detective and The Borderlander and SuperAustralians. He has self-published and published the works of others under the imprints of Opal Press Australia and Sequence Productions Pty Ltd.

He has written scripts for flagship superhero comic-book brands such as Justice League Adventures for DC Entertainment, and Iron Man and X-Men stories for Marvel Entertainment, notably contributing a Dazzler story, "I'm Gonna Stake You, Sucka" in X-Men: Curse of the Mutants – X-Men vs. Vampires No. 1. This story also features a character, Sheba Sugarfangs, invented by Sequeira for Marvel Comics. 1n 2023 he wrote "Star Trek Holoween" for IDW Publishing.

In 2010, Sequeira released Pulse of Darkness: The Vampire Syndrome graphic novel, a 140-page graphic novel illustrated by Kurt Stone, and based on the earlier Pulse of Darkness series published in Australia. The graphic novel features inkers and pin-up artists representing some of Australia's best, including Mark Morte, Bryce J. Stevens, David 'Hyperdave' Richardson, Ashley Riddell, Gary Chaloner, W. Chew 'Chewie' Chan, Paul Abstruse, and Jan Scherpenhuizen.

Sequeira has been a regular guest at comics and pop culture expos in Australia including Supanova Pop Culture Expo and Armageddon.

== Personal life ==
Sequeira's wedding ceremony in 1999 was covered on Australian national TV due to the celebrant and bridal party being dressed in costume, including Dracula, and Batman villains Penguin, Two-Face and Riddler. Sequeira lives with his wife and two children in Sydney.

== Award nominations ==
| Year | Award | Work | Category | Result |
|---|---|---|---|---|
| 2009 | WSFA Small Press Award | "His Last Arrow" | Original imaginative/speculative fiction published by a small press | Nomination |

== Works edited ==
- Terror Australis magazine (1987–92). Co-edited with Leigh Blackmore and Bryce J. Stevens. Sequeira coined the magazine's title and was also Art Editor for the magazine.
- Groves, Peter. Fruit from the Primeval Groves. Sydney: Sequence Productions, 1997. Verse.

== Fiction, art, verse, non-fiction ==
Sequeira's prose short stories and art have appeared in many publications including Bloodsongs, Eddie, Phantastique, Terror Australis: Best Australian Horror and The Australian H.P. Lovecraft Centenary Calendar (1990).

His story "Too Many Number Sixteens" appears in Midnight Echo 5 (Feb 2011), published by the Australian Horror Writers Association. For Holmesian fiction, see below.

His verse and non-fiction have appeared in Shoggoth and Terror Australis, and Sequeira also provided an introduction to the short story collection Skin Tight (1995) by fellow horror writer Bryce J. Stevens.

=== Holmesian work ===
Sequeira has contributed many essays and articles on Holmesian matters to the journal of the Sydney Passengers Sherlock Holmes Society, Passengers' Log. One of these, "No Stranger to the Knife: Sherlock Holmes Vs Jack the Ripper", has been praised by eminent Sherlock Holmes scholar Leslie S. Klinger as "a brilliant paper" in his Return of Sherlock Holmes (Sherlock Holmes Reference Library)(Oxford University Press, 2003).

Sequeira sold three Sherlockian prose stories to anthologies appearing in 2008. "His Last Arrow" in Charles Prepolec (ed) Gaslight Grimoire: Fantastic Tales of Sherlock Holmes (Edge Publishing) was nominated for a WSFA Small Press Award in 2009. Two other Holmesian stories – "The Return of the Sussex Vampire" and "The Adventure of the Haunted Showman" – appeared in David Stuart Davies (ed) Sherlock Holmes: The Game's Afoot! (Wordsworth). "The Adventure of the Haunted Showman" was also reprinted in The Dark Detective Sherlock Holmes Issue 6 (Dec 2010).

Sherlock Holmes: The Crossovers Casebook (Moonstone Publishing, 2012) features two Holmesian prose stories by Sequeira – "The Scion of Fear" and "The Adventure of the Lost Specialist".

In 2017, Sequeira edited the prose fiction anthology Sherlock Holmes: The Australian Casebook, featuring stories by Australian or Australia-based authors such as Kerry Greenwood, Kaaron Warren, Lucy Sussex, and Narrelle Harris. Sequeira himself contributed a story.

== Comics written and published ==
Sequeira contributed the comic-book story "Unearthing the Facts" in Kagamono: Flowers and Skulls (horror comic anthology from Black Glass Press, 2011), illustrated by David 'Hyperdave' Richardson.

His graphic story "The Catamorph" featuring the eponymous hero created with Jan Scherpenhuizen appeared in Terra Magazine No 1 (Black House Comics, 2012) with art by Scherpenhuizen and Michal Dutkiewicz.

In 2011, following the devastating 2010-2011 Queensland floods, Sequeira initiated and edited a comics project to raise funds for the Queensland Flood Relief Appeal. While the project was Sequeira's brainchild, Tim McEwen assisted with art directing, co-editing and commissioning. The one-shot graphic novel Tides of Hope featured stories and art by many Australian and international writers and artists, all of whom donated their work at no cost. Printing was funded by Supanova Pop Culture Expo. Sales of the comic raised $10,000, of which 100% was donated in support of the flood relief charity. Sequeira's story "Falling" (with art by Leinil Francis Yu) was included in the comic. . The line-up of writers and artists in the comic included Liz Argyll, Paul Bedford, Bernard Caleo, Greg Capullo, Gary Chaloner, W. Chew 'Chewie' Chan, Jason Chatfield, Chris Claremont, Rebecca Clements, Jeff Cruz, Julie Ditrich, Sarah Ellerton, Dave Elsey, Anton Emdin, Michael Evans, David Follett, Robert Forrest, Jason Franks, Doug Holgate, Paul Jenkins, Alex Major, Alex Maleev, Paul Mason, Tim McEwen, Stewart McKenny, Jessica McLeod, Michael Michalandos, Mandy Ord, Jason Paulos, Jan Scherpenhuizen, Mark Sexton, Jon Sommariva, Steve Stamadiadis, Kurt Stone, Komala Surman, Arthur Suydam, Jozef Szekeres, Tom Taylor, Ben Templesmith, Andie Tong, Daren White, and Colin Wilson (comics).

Sequeira's graphic story "I'm Gonna Stake You, Sucka" (with art by Sana Takeda) appears in X-Men: Curse of the Mutants: X-Men vs Vampires No 1 (2010) (Marvel Comics).

Sequeira's Iron Man story "Making an Appearance" (with art by W. Chew 'Chewie' Chan) appears in Astonishing Tales No 1 (2009) (Marvel Comics).

Sequeira's scripts have appeared in the DC Comics titles Justice League Adventures ("Cold War", Issue 12 & "Venomous Agenda", Issue 23), and 9/11: Artists Respond ("Tall Buildings").

His graphic Cthulhu Mythos story "Incorporation" appears in Cthulhu Tales No 11 (Boom! Studios).

In June 2009 Sequeira launched a new bimonthly Sherlock Holmes comic, Sherlock Holmes: Dark Detective published by Australia's Black House Comics. . The comic is produced in collaboration with makeup artist Dave Elsey, who won the Academy Award with Rick Baker for makeup on The Wolfman (see 83rd Academy Awards)Academy Award for Best Makeup, Phillip Cornell and Jan Scherpenhuizen. Academy Award-winning makeup artist Rick Baker asked to be the model for Professor Moriarty; Sequeira, Elsey and Cornell happily obliged and he is listed as a 'Stalwart Companion' in each issue's credits. Issue 7 appeared in 2011 and was followed by "The Dark Detective: Sherlock Holmes – Chimera", a trade paperback omnibus of the comic's first four issues with additional material on the genesis of the series by Sequeira, and additional sketches by Philip Cornell.

"Deadlocke and Doc Martin: Occult Investigators", a graphic story written by Sequeira and featuring real photography taken by him appeared in Too Much Red Cordial Issue 2 (Sydney University, 1995). A revised version appeared in Bold Action. Leigh Blackmore features as Deadlocke and Bryce J. Stevens as Doc Martin.

Comic/graphic novel productions under the Opal Press and Sequence Productions imprint:

- Pulse of Darkness. Reissued in collected form as Pulse of Darkness: The Vampire Syndrome (Cult Fiction Comics Australia, 2010).
- Rattlebone: The Pulp-Faced Detective
- Bold Action partly co-written with Leigh Blackmore, 'with art by Jan Scherpenhuizen, Neil Walpole, the team of Igor Spajic and Kurt Stone,
- Mister Blood co-created and with art by Jan Scherpenhuizen
- Jonny Flathead: Psychotronic Werewolf art by Gavin O'Keefe
- Dig This!
- The Borderlander co-written with co-creator Steve Proposch and with art by co-creator W Chew Chan
- The Glowing Man/Lyrebird. Issue One was a flip-comic with "The Glowing Man" on one side and "Lyrebird on the other. Created by Sequeira with W. Chew Chan and Jan Scherpenhuizen.

Forthcoming works include a contribution to the Avenger anthology for Moonstone Books The Avenger: Roaring Heart of the Crucible, and a collaboration with industry legend Mark Wald of the Justice Inc. - The Avenger storyline for Dynamite Entertainment. Sequeira is also collaborating with Chew Chan on a graphic novel utilising the Sax Rohmer character Fu Manchu - The Exoneration of Doctor Fu Manchu.

== As prose fiction anthology editor ==
- Proposch, Steve; Sequeira, Christopher; Stevens, Bryce; Campbell, eds. (2017). Cthulhu deep down under. Volume 1. Ramsey (writer of introduction); based on HP Lovecraft's Call of Cthulhu. IFWG Publishing Australia. ISBN 978-1-925496-45-1. "Celebrated horror writer H. P. Lovecraft's first major tale of his Cthulhu Mythos began an entire sub-genre of the macabre, and in that story he made Australia a crucial location in his supernatural universe. Now, a group of Australia's most accomplished writers of speculative fiction return to the promise of the master..."
- Proposch, Steve; Sequeira, Christopher; Stevens, Bryce, eds. (2018). Cthulhu deep down under. Volume 2. Rawlik, Peter (writer of introduction); based on HP Lovecraft's Call of Cthulhu. IFWG Publishing Australia. ISBN 9781925496994. "H. P. Lovecraft pioneered a fusion of terror and science fiction themes, and is widely credited as having invented the sub-genre of 'cosmic horror'. While America's New England was the focus and setting for many of Lovecraft's tales, the Southern Hemisphere held a fascination for him. Australia, New Zealand and Antarctica were featured locations in his Mythosian novellas...."

== Radio ==
Sequeira briefly hosted a radio show, The Darkness Before the Dawn on 2RRR-FM in Sydney.(1986)

== Films ==
Sequeira has directed two independent short films, "Curse of the Bloodsuckers", and "Rattlebone" (the latter based on his comic-book Rattlebone character).
