= Gaslight series =

2008 set of four anthologies

- Author: David Stuart Davies, Barbara Hambly, Christopher Sequeira, and Barbara Roden
- Cover artist: Timothy Lantz
- Language: English
- Genre: Fantasy, science fiction
- Publisher: EDGE Science Fiction, Calgary
- Publication date: October 1, 2008
- Publication place: Canada
- Media type: Written Word
- Pages: 304
- ISBN: 1-894063-17-1

The Gaslight series is a set of four anthologies of short fiction combining the character of Sherlock Holmes with elements of fantasy, horror, adventure and supernatural fiction. It consists of Gaslight Grimoire: Fantastic Tales of Sherlock Holmes (2008), Gaslight Grotesque: Nightmare Tales of Sherlock Holmes (2009), Gaslight Arcanum: Uncanny Tales of Sherlock Holmes (2011) and Gaslight Gothic: Strange Tales of Sherlock Holmes (2018).

The first volume was published in October 2008 by EDGE Science Fiction and Fantasy Publishing of Calgary, Alberta, Canada. The book was edited by J. R. Campbell and Charles Prepolec, with a foreword by David Stuart Davies. Cover art was by Timothy Lantz; the book features twelve full-page black and white illustrations by Phil Cornell.

The story "His Last Arrow" by Christopher Sequeira was nominated for a WSFA Small Press Award in 2009.

== Gaslight Grimoire ==
- "The Things That Shall Come Upon Them" by Barbara Roden
- "The Lost Boy" by Barbara Hambly
- "His Last Arrow" by Chris G.C. Sequeira (credited as Christopher Sequeira)
- "The Finishing Stroke" by M. J. Elliott
- "Sherlock Holmes in the Lost World" by Martin Powell
- "The Grantchester Grimoire" by Rick Kennett & A. F. Kidd (credited as Chico Kidd)
- "The Strange Affair of the Steamship Friesland" by Peter Calamai
- "The Entwined" by J. R. Campbell
- "Merridew of Abominable Memory" by Chris Roberson
- "Red Sunset" by Bob Madison
- "The Red Planet League" by Kim Newman

== Gaslight Grotesque ==
- "Hounded" by Stephen Volk
- "The Death Lantern" by Lawrence C. Connolly
- "The Quality of Mercy" by William Meikle
- "Emily’s Kiss" by James A. Moore
- "The Tragic Case of the Child Prodigy" by William Patrick Maynard
- "The Last Windigo" by Hayden Trenholm
- "Celeste" by Neil Jackson
- "The Best Laid Plans" by Robert Lauderdale
- "Exalted are the Forces of Darkness" by Leigh Blackmore
- "The Affair of the Heart" by Mark Morris
- "The Hand-Delivered Letter" by Simon Kurt Unsworth
- "Of the Origin of the Hound of the Baskervilles" by Barbara Roden
- "Mr. Other’s Children" by J. R. Campbell

== Gaslight Arcanum ==
- "The Comfort of the Seine" by Stephen Volk
- "The Adventure of Lucifer’s Footprints" by Christopher Fowler
- "The Deadly Sin of Sherlock Holmes" by Tom English
- "The Colour that Came to Chiswick" by William Meikle
- "A Country Death" by Simon K. Unsworth
- "From the Tree of Time" by Fred Saberhagen
- "Sherlock Holmes and the Diving Bell" by Simon Clark
- "The Executioner" by Lawrence C. Connolly
- "Sherlock Holmes and the Great Game" by Kevin Cockle
- "The Greatest Mystery" by Paul Kane
- "The House of Blood" by Tony Richards
- "The Adventure of the Six Maledictions" by Kim Newman

== Gaslight Gothic ==
- "The Cuckoo's Hour" by Mark A. Latham
- "The Spirit of Death" by David Stuart Davies
- "Father of the Man" by Stephen Volk
- "The Strange Case of Dr. Sacker and Mr. Hope" by James Lovegrove
- "The Ignoble Sportsmen" by Josh Reynolds
- "The Strange Adventure of Mary Holder" by Nancy Holder
- "The Lizard Lady of Pemberton Grange" by Mark Morris
- "The Magic of Africa" by Kevin P. Thornton
- "A Matter of Light" by Angela Slatter
- "The Song of a Want" by Lyndsay Faye

== See also ==
- Shadows Over Baker Street
