= The Australian Horror and Fantasy Magazine =

- Issue 5/6 cover
- Editors: Barry M. Radburn, Stephen Studach
- Frequency: irregular, 6 issues 1984-87
- Publisher: Dark Press
- Founded: 1984
- Final issue: 1986
- Company: Dark Press
- Country: Australia
- Based in: Penrith, NSW
- Language: English
- ISSN: 0813-2518
- OCLC: 220287511

The Australian Horror and Fantasy Magazine (1984–86) was edited by (Michael) Barry Radburn and Stephen Studach. The first Australian semi-professional publication devoted to the weird and the macabre, it was published by Radburn's imprint Dark Press. It ran six issues; Issues 1, 2 and 3 all appeared in 1984, issue 4 in 1985 and the last, a double issue (5/6), which was co-edited by Carol Dobson and Nerida Radburn, 1986.

"Australia has never produced a straight fantasy magazine, though in 1970 Sword and Sorcery, a putative companion to Ronald E Graham's Vision of Tomorrow, reached dummy stage before a poor financial deal killed it. Void (5 issues 1975-1977), an sf magazine, published occasional fantasy. Not until The Australian Horror & Fantasy Magazine (5 issues Summer 1984-Fall 1985) did a specialist publication emerge in the small-press field, though it concentrated mostly on horror, in imitation of WT [i.e. Weird Tales]. The same applied to Terror Australis (3 issues Fall 1988-Summer 1992), which emphasized graphic visceral horror."

Though it did not pay authors, AH&FM was Australia's first specialist semi-professional magazine in the genre, publishing many local writers such as Rick Kennett and Leigh Blackmore who would go on to achieve lasting reputations, as well stories by American writers. Others, such as Paul Collins and Kurt von Trojan, have been prominent in Australian science fiction.

In total the magazine published 31 original stories and 20 original poems, of which about half were contributed by Australian authors. From 1987, the magazine was continued under the editorship of Leigh Blackmore as Terror Australis magazine.

== Barry Radburn (B. Michael Radburn) ==
Radburn, also a writer, contributed to such other magazines as Arkham Sampler (Strange Company new series), Eldritch Tales, Dark Dreams, Etchings and Odysseys, Footsteps, Haunts and Doppelganger in the late 1980s. An example of his work is the tale "Shadows in the Moonlight" (Etchings and Odysseys No 10, 1987). His story "The Shambler in the Shadows" (in collaboration with Dave Reeder, editor of UK horror magazines Fantasy Macabre and Halls of Horror, belongs to the Cthulhu Mythos. He appeared to have left the horror writing scene in Australia subsequent to publishing his magazine; however in an interview in Studies in Australian Weird Fiction No 3 (2009) Radburn revealed that he has continued to write under a pseudonym for various magazines published in Australia and the United States. Radburn is currently a member of the Australian Horror Writers Association and has an online blog. He has edited The Imaginings Sampler and has won several literary awards for his fiction including the Melbourne University Literary Award and the Henry Lawson Festival Award. Radburn conducts independent writing courses as well as working as a Compliance Manager in the print/publishing industry (he has written several technical manuals for the print and publishing sector).

Radburn's novel The Crossing was published by Pantera Press (2011). He was a judge on the Australian Shadows Awards in 2012; the same year his second novel, Blackwater Moon was published. Pantera Press published The Falls, Radburn's third novel in the connected sequence featuring character Taylor Bridges, in 2016.

== Stephen Studach ==
Stephen Studach also published horror stories in various magazines including Eldritch Tales and Crypt of Cthulhu. His Cthulhu Mythos story "The Space of Madness" is included in Robert M. Price (ed), The Azathoth Cycle: Tales of the Blind Idiot God. Oakland CA: Chaosium, Inc, 1995. He has published two horror books – Penumbra (Galley Press, 1997) (short stories) and A Thing of Beauty (Adelaide: Paroxysm Press, 2004) (a novella). He also edited the third issue of Midnight Echo magazine for the Australian Horror Writers Association. His tale "Rubber Monsters" was a finalist in the Australian Horror Writers Association contest for 2006. Studach is also a published poet, book and cinema reviewer, and has qualifications in film production and direction.

== See also ==
- Science fiction magazine
- Fantasy fiction magazine
- Horror fiction magazine
