= Bloodsongs =

Bloodsongs magazine was created by Steve Proposch and Chris A. Masters in 1993 as a vehicle for original Australian horror fiction. It was published by Bambada Press in Melbourne Australia from 1993 to 1997.

The Melbourne University Press Encyclopaedia of Science Fiction & Fantasy (1998), edited by Paul Collins considers Bloodsongs to be "Australia's first professional horror and dark fantasy magazine" (p. 143). According to this source "the best dark fantasy tales from [issues after No 3] are: "What the Stone of Ciparri Says" (Bloodsongs 6), a sinister ghost story by Francis Payne; "The Hanging People" (Bloodsongs 7) by Kaaron Warren, a surreal, abstract tale that examines the morality of cigarette manufacture; and "The Bloom of Decay" (Bloodsongs 7) by Patricia McCormack, a darkly Gothic piece."

The first three issues of the magazine were co-edited by Steve Proposch and Chris A. Masters. Issue One contained an interview with Leigh Blackmore. Bill Congreve, Sean McMullen and Steve Paulsen's William Atheling Jr award-winning essay, "A History of Australian Horror", notes that "Issue 1 received some criticism for tending towards the splatter end of the genre... A Category One Restricted rating by the Attorney General's department saw it restricted to readers 18 years and older, and banned altogether in the state of Queensland." (Bonescribes: Year's Best Australian Horror 1995, p. 135)

Issues 4-7 were edited-in-chief by Steve Proposch and co-edited by Chris A. Masters and Bryce J. Stevens. According to the MUP Encyclopaedia, issues 4-7 reflected a "swing away from graphic horror to a more balanced approach." (p 143). Writers who published stories in the magazine included Ramsey Campbell, Poppy Z. Brite, Robert Hood, Sean Williams, Richard Harland, Kyla Ward, Kaaron Warren and D.F. Lewis.

During that time all published contributions to the magazine were paid for, and all submitters were offered detailed and prompt feedback on their fledgling work. Kyla Ward acted as NSW agent and advertising manager for the magazine.

In 1997, Bloodsongs was taken over by Implosion Publishing, based in the USA. The Implosion Publishing issues (Nos 8–11) were given UK distribution through BBR Distribution of Sheffield. In the US it was sold through heavy metal record shops and other outlets. Steve Proposch remained fiction editor until issue 10 (1998), after which publication of the title was discontinued. Due to an agreement between Bambada Press and Implosion Publishing, copyright for the title and masthead design has now reverted to the original owners, being Steve Proposch and Chris A. Masters.

Bambada Press also published one separate chapbook - Olympia by Francis Payne.
