= William Atheling Jr. Award =

Special category in the Ditmar awards

The William Atheling Jr. Award for Criticism or Review are a Special Category under the Ditmar Awards. "The Athelings", as they are known for short, are awarded for excellence in science fiction and speculative criticism, and were named for the pseudonym used by James Blish for his critical writing.

== William Atheling Jr. Award nominees and winners ==
Winners are in bold.

=== 1976 ===
- Algis Budrys - Foundation & Asimov
- James Gunn - Alternative Worlds
- David Ketterer - New Worlds For Old
- **George Turner - Paradigm and Pattern; Form and Meaning in "The Dispossessed"**
- George Turner - Philip Dick by 1975

=== 1977 ===
- **Susan Wood - Women and Science Fiction, Algol, 33, 1978**
- John Bangsund - Parergon Papers 10, ANZAPA, Oct 1978
- John McPharlin - On The Ebb Tide of the New Wave, Auto Delerium, March 1978
- Lloyd Biggle Jr - The Morasses of Academe Revisited, Analog, Sept 1978

(...must be filled in—see listed reference)

=== 1998 ===
- Katharine (née Shade) and Darren Maxwell – X-files episode reviews (Frontier #59).
- **Sean McMullen & Steven Paulsen – "Australian Contemporary Fantasy" (Encyclopedia of Fantasy #173, Orbit).**

=== 2000 ===
There were some changes in the Ditmar Award rules in 2000; the first attempted halted; after a second nomination process the 2000 Ditmars and the Athelings were awarded in 2001.

==== Original ballot ====
- Van Ikin, Russell Blackford & Sean McMullen - Strange Constellations: A History of Australian Science Fiction (Greenwood).
- Judith Buckrich - George Turner: A Life 1916-1997 (M.U.P.).
- Robert Hood - Articles (i.am ezine).
- Janeen Webb & Andrew Enstice, - The Fantastic Self (Eidolon Press).
- Jonathan Strahan & Steven Paulsen - The Coode Street Review of Science Fiction

==== Final ballot, and winners (tie) ====
- Robert Hood - Writings in i.am website
- **Tess Williams & Helen Merrick - Women Of Other Worlds**
- Jonathan Strahan - Reviews in Locus
- **Russell Blackford, Van Ikin & Sean McMullen - Strange Constellations: A History Of Australian Science Fiction**
- Jonathan Strahan and Steven Paulsen - The Coode St Review of Science Fiction

=== 2007 ===
- Miranda Siemienowicz - Review of Paraspheres (Horrorscope).
- **Justine Larbalestier - Daughters of Earth: Feminist Science Fiction in the Twentieth Century.**
- Robert Hood - "Man and Super-Monster: A History of Daikaiju Eiga and its Metaphorical Undercurrents" (Borderlands #7).
- Grant Watson - Bad Film Diaries - Sink or Swim: The Truth Behind Waterworld (Borderlands #8).
- Kathryn Linge - Review of Through Soft Air (ASif)

=== 2008 ===
- Ian Nichols – "Seriatem, Seriatum, omnia Seriatem" (Andromeda Spaceways Inflight Magazine #30).
- Tansy Rayner Roberts & Alexandra Pierce – review of Elizabeth Bear's New Amsterdam (Published as Podcast #2 on ASiF!).
- Jonathan Strahan – editorial for The New Space Opera (HarperCollins Australia).
- **Grant Watson for "The Bad Film Diaries" (Published in Borderlands #9).**
- Ben Peek – Aurealis Awards Shortlist Feature Article (Published on ASiF!).
- Shane Jiraiya Cummings – review of David Conyers' and John Sunseri's The Spiraling Worm (Published on Horrorscope).
- Ian Nichols – "The Shadow Thief" (The West Australian Weekend Magazine, 22 September 2007).

=== 2009 ===
- Shane Jiraiya Cummings – "Dark Suspense: The End of the Line" (Black: Australian Dark Culture Magazine #3)
- Robert Hood – "George A. Romero: Master of the Living Dead" (Black: Australian Dark Culture Magazine #2)
- Grant Watson – "Bad Film Diaries - Sometimes the Brand Burns: Tim Burton and the Planet of the Apes" (Borderlands #10)
- **Kim Wilkins – "Popular genres and the Australian literary community: the case of fantasy fiction" (Journal of Australian Studies)**

=== 2010 ===
- Chuck McKenzie – “The Dead Walk! … Into a Bookstore Near You” (Eye of Fire #1, Brimstone Press).
- Ian Mond – reviews on his blog (mondyboy.livejournal.com).
- Grant Watson – reviews and articles for Eiga: Asian Cinema (www.eigaasiancinema.com).
- **Helen Merrick – The Secret Feminist Cabal: a cultural history of science fiction feminisms (Aqueduct Press).**

=== 2011 ===
- Leigh Blackmore – "Marvels and Horrors: Terry Dowling's Clowns at Midnight" (21st Century Gothic, Scarecrow Press).
- Damien Broderick – Skiffy and Mimesis: More Best of Australian Science Fiction Review (Wildside Press).
- Ross Murray – "The Australian Dream Becomes Nightmare - Visions of Suburbia in Australian Science Fiction" (Andromeda Spaceways Inflight Magazine #44).
- **Tansy Rayner Roberts – "A Modern Woman’s Guide to Classic Who."**

=== 2012 ===
- Liz Grzyb & Talie Helene – "2010: The Year in Review" (The Year's Best Australian Fantasy and Horror 2010, Ticonderoga Publications).
- Damien Broderick & Van Ikin – editing Warriors of the Tao: The Best of Science Fiction: A Review of Speculative Literature (Borgo Press).
- David McDonald, Tansy Rayner Roberts & Tehani Wessely – "Reviewing New Who" series (A Conversational Life).
- **Alexandra Pierce & Tehani Wessely – reviews of Vorkosigan Saga (Randomly Yours, Alex & FableCroft).**
- Russell Blackford – "Currently reading: Jonathan Strange and Mr Norrell by Susanna Clarke" (Metamagician and the Hellfire Club).

=== 2013 ===
- Alisa Krasnostein, Kathryn Linge, David McDonald, & Tehani Wessely – conversational review of Mira Grant's Newsflesh trilogy (ASIF).
- **Tansy Rayner Roberts – “Historically Authentic Sexism in Fantasy. Let's Unpack That.” (Tor.com).**
- David McDonald, Tansy Rayner Roberts, & Tehani Wessely – “New Who in Conversation” series (A Conversational Life).
- Liz Grzyb & Talie Helene – “The Year in Review” (The Year’s Best Australian Fantasy and Horror 2011).
- Rjurik Davidson – “An Illusion in the Game for Survival”, a review of Reamde by Neal Stephenson (The Age).

=== 2014 (tie) ===
- Alexandra Pierce – Reviews (Randomly Yours, Alex).
- "Things Invisible: Human and Ab-Human in Two of Hodgson's Carnacki stories", Leigh Blackmore, in Sargasso: The Journal of William Hope Hodgson Studies #1 edited by Sam Gafford (Ulthar Press)
- **Alisa Krasnostein, Alex Pierce, & Tansy Rayner Roberts – Galactic Suburbia Episode 87: Saga Spoilerific Book Club.**
- **David McDonald, Tansy Rayner Roberts, & Tehani Wessely – “New Who in Conversation” series (A Conversational Life).**
- Leigh Blackmore – "A Puppet's Parody of Joy: Dolls, Puppets and Mannikins as Diabolical Other", in Ramsey Campbell: Critical Essays on the Master of Modern Horror edited by Gary William Crawford (Scarecrow Press).
- George Ivanoff – "That was then, this is now: how my perceptions have changed", in Doctor Who and Race edited by Lindy Orthia (Intellect Books).

=== 2015 ===
- **Tansy Rayner Roberts – "Does Sex Make Science Fiction Soft?" in Uncanny Magazine, no. 1.**

== See also ==
- Ditmar award results
