= Chewbacca (disambiguation) =

Chewbacca, or Chewie, is a character in the Star Wars media franchise.

Chewbacca or Chewie may also refer to:

- Chewbacca Mask Lady, a 2016 viral video
- "Chewbacca", a song by Supernova included on Clerks: Music from the Motion Picture
- "Chewbacca", a song by Liquid Tension Experiment from the album Liquid Tension Experiment 2
- Chewbacca defense, a legal strategy focused on confusing the jury rather than refuting an argument
- "Chewie", a cat in the List of Marvel Comics characters: C
- Chewie Chan, artist
