= Kurt von Trojan =

Kurt von Trojan (1937 in Vienna, Austria – 22 March 2006) was an Australian journalist and science fiction author. He also worked as a psychiatric nurse and a cinema projectionist.

== Early life ==
Kurt von Trojan studied at the London Film School and the South Australian School of Art. (1976–1977)

== Career ==
Short fiction by von Trojan appeared in magazines including Terror Australis.

On 25 January 2006 he was diagnosed with bone and kidney cancer and told he had only a few months to live. He is reported to have told his doctors "Oh, I was hoping to squeeze a few more weeks in." A final collection of short stories was published as a memorial by Altair Australia. Kurt von Trojan's last published work When I Close My Eyes was organized by Robert N. Stephenson and funded by the speculative fiction community. The book was printed and a copy presented to Kurt on his birthday a few days before his death.

== Recognition ==
He won the

- International Pater Award
- Ian Reed Award
- Colin Thiele Award
- Tom Howard Award

== Bibliography ==
=== Long fiction ===
- Bedmates, 1984
- The Transing Syndrome, 1985, Nominated for the Ditmar Award, Best Australian Long Fiction, 1986
- Mars in Scorpio, 1990, Wakefield Press, ISBN 1 86254 257 0
- Tenocha, 1995, ISBN 978-0-646-20951-7
- Coup, 1997, Permanent Press, from a grant from literature S.A. ISBN 1 86417 008 5
- The Atrocity Shop, 1998, ISBN 0-646-35405-1

=== Short fiction ===
- The Man Who Snatched Marilyn's Body, 1994, published in Alien Shores, 1994, eds. Peter McNamara, Margaret Winch, ISBN 1-875346-09-0

=== Non-fiction ===
- Creative Writing: a no-nonsense approach, 1989 The Wednesday Press, ISBN 0-947249-13-3
