= Kyla Ward =

Australian writer, poet, and actor

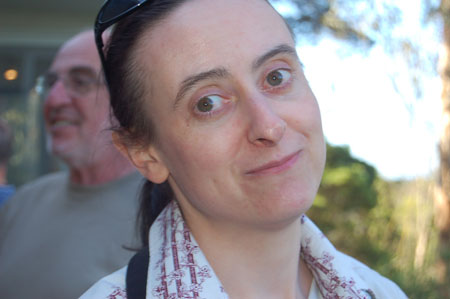
- Kyla Ward in 2007
- Born: New South Wales, Australia
- Occupations: Writer, actor
- Writing career
- Pen name: Edwina Grey (shared)
- Period: 1994–present
- Genre: Speculative fiction
- Website: www.kylaward.com

Kyla (Lee) Ward is an Australian writer of speculative fiction, poet and actor. Her work has been nominated multiple times for the Ditmar Award, the Aurealis Award, the Australian Shadows Award, the Bram Stoker Award and the Rhysling Award. She won the Aurealis Award in 2006 for her collaborative novel Prismatic (as by 'Edwina Grey').

== Biography ==
Ward was born in New South Wales, Australia. She attended the University of Technology, Sydney where she gained a BA in communications.

== Writing ==
Ward was first published in 1994 with her poem "Mary" which was featured in the magazine Bloodsongs. In 2002 her short story "The Boneyard" was nominated for the Ditmar Award for best short fiction but lost to Lucy Sussex and Jack Dann. In 2006 she won her first award with the novel Prismatic, co-authored with Evan Paliatseas and David Carroll under the shared pseudonym of Edwina Grey. Prismatic tied with Will Elliott's The Pilo Family Circus to win the Aurealis Award for best horror novel.

Ward has also contributed to role-playing games including Buffy the Vampire Slayer Roleplaying Game by Eden Studios, Inc. and White Wolf's Demon: The Fallen.

== Acting ==
Ward has also been a member of the Theatre of Blood repertory company where she acted and also wrote. In 2018 she became the eponymous Guide to Deadhouse, Tales Of Sydney Morgue, an immersive theatre production devoted to true crime in Sydney city and taking place at historic locations. Ward wrote and produced and acted in the short film Bad Reception which premiered at A Night of Horror 2009 and screened at the Vampire Film Festival in New Orleans. Ward has also worked as an assistant director and sound recordist in a number of short films, for instance as sound recordist on Indulgence (1996) (written and directed by Glenn Fraser).

== Artwork ==
Apart from illustrating her own collections, Ward also has contributed artwork for various publications including Fables and Reflections, the cover of Epiphanies of Blood: Tales of Desperation and Thirst, Southern Blood, Borderlands, Bloodsongs, Tabula-Rasa, and Burnt Toast.

== Awards and nominations ==
Year	Award	Work	Category	Result
2002	Ditmar Award	"The Boneyard"	Best short fiction	Nomination
2002	Ditmar Award	Tabula-Rasa (with David Carroll)	Best fan production	Nomination
2003	Aurealis Award	"Kijin Tea"	Best horror short story	Nomination
2004	Ditmar Award	"Kijin Tea"	Best short story	Nomination
2006	Aurealis Award	Prismatic (with Evan Paliatseas and David Carroll as Edwina Grey)	Best horror novel	Won
2007	Ditmar Award	Prismatic (with Evan Paliatseas and David Carroll as Edwina Grey)	Best novel	Nomination
2007	Ditmar Award	"The Bat's Boudoir"	Best short story	Nomination
2012	Rhysling Award	"The Soldier's Return"	Best long poem	Nomination
2012	Rhysling Award	"The Kite"	Best short poem	Nomination
2013	Rhysling Award	"Lucubration"	Best long poem	Nomination
2018	Australian Shadows Award	"A Shared Ambition - Horror Writers in Horror Fiction"	Best non-fiction	Nomination
2019	Bram Stoker Award	"And In Her Eyes The City Drowned"	Best short story	Nomination
2019	Australian Shadows Award	"Revenants of the Antipodes"	Best poem	Won
2020	Australian Shadows Award	"The Danse Macabre - an essay"	Rocky Wood Award for non-fiction and criticism	Won
2020	Rhysling Award	"The Macabre Modern"	Best long poem	Third Place
2021	Bram Stoker Award	"Should Fire Remember the Fuel?"	Best short story	Nomination
2022	Australian Shadows Award	"Vampire Poetry"	Rocky Wood Award for non-fiction and criticism	Nomination
2022	Bram Stoker Award	"A Whisper in the Death Pit"	Best short story	Nomination
2022	Rhysling Award	"Wardrobe Malfunction"	Best short poem	Nomination

== Bibliography ==
=== Novels ===
- Prismatic (2006, with Evan Paliatseas and David Carroll as Edwina Grey)
- Those That Pursue Us Yet (2023)

=== Collections ===
- The Land of Bad Dreams (edited by Charles (Danny) Lovecraft). Sydney: P'rea Press, 2011. ISBN 978-0-9804625-7-9. Illustrated by the author, poetry and prose. Contains otherwise unpublished work.

Note: The launch of this book was accompanied by dramatic interpretations by various theatre groups. Video of the performances is available on the kylawtr Youtube channel. Reviewing the volume at Hellnotes, the reviewer praised Ward's work:

- The Macabre Modern and Other Morbidities (edited by Charles (Danny) Lovecraft). Sydney: P'rea Press, 2019 ISBN 9780994390127. Illustrated by the author, poetry, prose and essay. Contains otherwise unpublished work.

Note: The launch of this book was accompanied by a "danse macabre". Video of the performances is available on the kylawtr Youtube channel.

- This Attraction Now Open Till Late - strange sights and shadows (edited by Alessandro Manzetti). Trieste: Independent Legions Publishing, 2022 ISBN 9791280713414. Cover art by Alessandro Amoruso, short fiction. Contains otherwise unpublished work.

=== Short fiction ===
- "The Feast" (1999) in Aurealis No. 24 (ed. Dirk Strasser, Stephen Higgins)
- "The Boneyard" (2001) in Gothic.net September 2001
- "Poison" (2002) in Passing Strange (ed. Bill Congreve)
- "Sakoku" (2002) in Agog! Fantastic Fiction (ed. Cat Sparks)
- "Kijin Tea" (2003) in Agog! Terrific Tales (ed. Cat Sparks)
- "The Oracle of Brick and Bone" (2005) in Borderlands No. 5
- "The Bat's Boudoir" (2007) in Shadowed Realms No. 9
- "A Tour of the City of Assassins" (2009) in Ticon No. 4
- "Cursebreaker: The Welsh Widow and the Wandering Wooer" (2010) in Scary Kisses (ed. Liz Grzyb)
- "Erina Hearn and the God of Death" (2010) in Macabre: A Journey Into Australia's Worst Fears (ed. Angela Challis & Marty Young)
- "Cursebreaker: The Jikininki and the Japanese Jurist" (2013) in The New Hero: Vol. 1 (ed. Robin D. Laws)
- "The Loquacious Cadaver" (2013) in The Lion and the Aardvark: Aesop's Modern Fables (ed. Robin D. Laws)
- "Who Looks Back?" (2013) in Shotguns v. Cthulhu (ed. Robin D. Laws)
- "The Character Assassin" (2013) in Schemers (ed. Robin D. Laws)
- "Cursebreaker: the Mutalibeen and the Memphite Mummies" (2015) in Hear Me Roar (ed. Liz Grzyb)
- "The Leucrotta" (2015) in Gods, Memes and Monsters: A Twenty-first Century Bestiary (ed. Heather J. Wood
- "And In Her Eyes the City Drowned" (2018) in Weirdbook #39
- "Should Fire Remember The Fuel?" (2020) in Oz Is Burning, (ed. Phyllis Irene Radford)
- "A Whisper in the Death Pit" (2021) in Weirdbook #44
- "Gargoyles as they Grumble" (2022) in The Gargoylicon - Imaginings and Images of the Gargoyle in Literature and Art, (ed. Frank Coffman)
- "This Attraction Now Open Till Late" (2022) in Vastarien Spring 2022 (Vol 5 #1)
- "The Varying Value of Graves" (2022) in Damnation Games (ed. Alan Baxter)

=== Poems ===
- "Mary" (1994) in Bloodsongs #3 (ed. Chris A. Masters, Steve Proposch)
- "Herbal Tea" (1995) in Bloodsongs #6 (ed. Steve Proposch)
- "Night Cars" (1999) in Abaddon #2
- "The Land of Dreams Gone Bad" (2011) in Midnight Echo #5
- "The Exorcism" (2011) in Midnight Echo #5
- "The Kite" (2011) in The Land of Bad Dreams
- "The Soldier's Return" (2011) in The Land of Bad Dreams
- "Lucubration" (2012) in Avatars of Wizardry (ed. Charles Lovecraft)
- "Necromancy" (2014) in Spectral Realms #1
- "The Stone of Sacrifice" (2016)in Spectral Realms #4
- "Dual Purpose" (2017)in Spectral Realms #6
- "Vanth – A Myth Derived" (2017) in Eternal Haunted Summer : Summer Solstice 2017, ed. Rebecca Buchanan
- "Tattered Livery" (2017) in Weirdbook #37
- "Libitina's Garden – a triptych" (2018)in Mythic Delirium 4.4
- "Revenants of the Antipodes" (2019) in HWA Poetry Showcase V, ed. Stephanie Wytovich
- "Mourning Rites", (2019) in The Audient Void #7
- "The Siege", (2020) in HWA Poetry Showcase VII, ed. Stephanie Wytovich
- "Lo Stregozzo", (2020) in Eternal Haunted Summer : Winter Solstice 2020, ed. Rebecca Buchanan
- "Wardrobe Malfunction", (2021) in Infectious Hope: Poems of Hope and Resilience from the Pandemic, ed. Silvia Rondoni
- "Never Leave the Path", (2023) in Eternal Haunted Summer : Winter Solstice 2023, ed. Rebecca Buchanan
- "Ophelia's Return" (2024) in HWA Poetry Showcase X, ed. Angela Yuriko Smith
- "Malvolio's Revenge" (2024) in Spectral Realms #10, ed. S.T. Joshi
- "Miranda's Resolve" (2024) in Spectral Realms #10, ed. S. T. Joshi

=== Role-playing games ===
- Mystical Places
- "Arcanities" (2001)
- "The Schriebach Estate" (2001)
- "The Scalper" (2009) in Eden Studio Presents #3
- The Demon Storyteller's Guide (2002, co-author)
- "Suffer the Children" (2003) in Fear to Tread
- "The Court of Chimera" (2009) in Eden Studio Presents #3
- "Dominion" (2009) in Pyramid Magazine #3/10
- "The Journey of the Dead" (2011) in Pyramid Magazine #3/38

Contributed to:

- The Demon Players' Guide (2003)
- Damned and Deceived: the Book of Thralls (2003)
- Demon: The Earthbound (2003)
- Time of Judgment (2004)

=== Scripts ===
- Bad Reception (2008) directed by Andrew Orman, 4TOD Productions. Screened at A Night of Horror 2009, and the Vampire Film Festival 2009
- Chocolate Curses, "a comedy in dubious taste." (2010) directed by Steve Hopley. Played as part of the Season II program of the Theatre of Blood
- It's Only Magic, with Jon Blum. Intomedia (2020) directed by Josh Aviet.

=== Essays ===
- "Scaring the Children" in Bloodsongs No. 8 (ed. Steve Proposch)
- "Playing the Classics: Role Playing Your Favorite Novels" (2002) in Black Gate (ed. John O'Neill)
- "Reading the Game – Depictions of Role-Playing in Popular Culture" (2013) in Strange Horizons No. 28 (ed. Niall Harrison
- "A Shared Ambition - Horror Writers in Horror Fiction" (2017) in Midnight Echo #12
- "The Danse Macabre" in The Macabre Modern and Other Morbidities (2019) P'rea Press.
- "Vampire Poetry" in Penumbra #2 (2021) Hippocampus Press.

=== Articles ===
- "Gaming Freeform" (1994) in Australian Realms No. 17
- "Australia" (1996) in The BFI Companion to Horror (ed. Kim Newman)
- "Castle, Sweet Castle" (2002) in d20weekly.com
- "Get Lost" (2004) in Dragon No. 326
- "Tomb Raider" (2005) in Dragon No. 327
- "The Petit Tarrasque and Other Monsters" (2005) in Dragon No. 329
- "Australian Gargoyles" (2007) in Art Monthly Australia No. 200
- "Coffin Culture" (2008) in Black: Australian Dark Culture #3
- "Dark Humour in Revelation of the Daleks" (2010, with David Carroll and Kate Orman) in Burnt Toast
- "Symbolism" (2010, with David Carroll and Kate Orman) in Burnt Toast
- "Dungeons and Deadlines" (2011) in WQ Magazine
- "Spot the Horror Writer" (2017) in HWA Newsletter #215
- "The Blacker the Shadow" (2021) in Outside In Wants To Believe (ed. Stacey Smith?)
- "The Whole Dining Room Suite" (2022) in Outside In Walks With Fire (ed. Stacey Smith?)
- "Kyla Lee Ward is Stuck in a Gothic World!" (2023) in Gingernuts of Horror, April 2023
- "How to Stake a Timelord" (2023) in Outside In Regenerates (ed. Stacey Smith?)
- "A Rookwood Ramble" (2023) in HWA Newsletter #267
- "Long Be-nightmar'd - on dreams in Gothic and Weird Fiction" (2024) in JOURN-E 3.1, ed. Frank Coffman
- "Childhood Fears - Those That Pursue Us Yet" (2024) in Gingernuts of Horror, March 2024
