= Leanne Frahm =

Australian writer (1946–2025)

- Born: 28 February 1946; Brisbane, Queensland, Australia
- Died: 10 June 2025 (aged 79); Melbourne, Australia
- Writing career
- Genre: Speculative short fiction
- Notable work: Borderline

Leanne Frahm (28 February 1946 – 10 June 2025) was an Australian writer of speculative short fiction.

== Life and career ==
Frahm was born in Brisbane, Queensland, Australia on 28 February 1946. She received her first nomination for her work in 1978 when she was a finalist for the 1979 Ditmar Award for Best Fan Writer. The following year she won the Best Fan Writer award. Frahm's first publication was in 1980, entitled "The Wood for the Trees" which was published in the anthology Chrysalis 6, edited by Roy Torgeson. In 1981 Frahm's work, "Deus Ex Corporus", won the 1981 Ditmar Award for Best Short Fiction. She won a Ditmar Award again in 1994 for "Catalyst". In 1996 her story "Borderline" won the 1996 Aurealis Award for Best Science Fiction Short Story. The following year she won the Ditmar Award for Best Fan Writer for the second time.

Frahm died in Melbourne on 10 June 2025, at the age of 79.

== Bibliography ==
=== Short fiction ===
- "The Wood for the Trees" (1980) in Chrysalis 6 (ed. Roy Torgeson)
- "Passage to Earth" (1980) in Galileo, January 1980 (ed. Charles C. Ryan)
- "Deus Ex Corporus" (1980) in Chrysalis 7 (ed. Roy Torgeson)
- "Barrier" (1980) in Chrysalis 8 (ed. Roy Torgeson)
- "Beyond Our Shores, a Colony" (1981 with Paul Collins) in Distant Worlds (ed. Paul Collins)
- "Horn O' Plenty" (1981 with Terry Carr) in Stellar 7: Science Fiction Stories (ed. Judy-Lynn del Rey)
- "A Way Back" (1983) in Universe 13 (ed. Terry Carr)
- "Lost" (1983) in Chrysalis 10 (ed. Roy Torgeson)
- "High Tide" (1983) in Fears (ed. Charles L. Grant)
- "The Visitor" (1985) in Midnight (ed. Charles L. Grant)
- "On the Turn" (1986) in Shadows 9 (ed. Charles L. Grant)
- "The Supramarket" (1987) in Doom City (ed. Charles L. Grant)
- "Reichelman's Relics" (1990) in Amazing Stories, July 1990 (ed. Patrick Lucien Price)
- "Olive Truffles" (1991, a.k.a. "Olivetruffles") in Eidolon, Winter 1991 (ed. Jeremy G. Byrne)
- "The Buyer" (1991) in Aurealis #5 (ed. Stephen Higgins, Dirk Strasser)
- "The Lamadium Affair" (1992) in Eidolon, Spring 1992 (ed. Jeremy G. Byrne, Jonathan Strahan)
- "Catalyst" (1993) in Terror Australis: The Best of Australian Horror (ed. Leigh Blackmore)
- "Land's End" (1994) in Alien Shores : An Anthology of Australian Science Fiction (ed. Peter McNamara, Margaret Winch)
- "Jinx Ship" (1994) in The Patternmaker : Nine Science Fiction Stories (ed. Lucy Sussex)
- "Entropy" (1995) in Bonescribes: Year's Best Australian Horror: 1995 (ed. Bill Congreve, Robert Hood)
- "Borderline" (1996) in Borderline (ed. Leanne Frahm)
- "Ithaca Week" (1996) in Borderline (ed. Leanne Frahm)
- "Rain Season" (1998) in Eidolon, Issue 27, Autumn 1998 (ed. Jonathan Strahan, Jeremy G. Byrne, Richard Scriven)
- "Skein Dogs" (2005) in The Year's Best Australian Science Fiction & Fantasy: Volume Two (ed. Bill Congreve, Michelle Marquardt)

=== Collections ===
- Borderline (1996)

=== Essays ===
- Bibliography (1996) in Borderline (ed. Leanne Frahm)

Source: isfdb.org

== Awards and nominations ==
Aurealis Awards

- Best Horror Short Story
  - 1995: Nomination: "Entropy"
- Best Science Fiction Short Story
  - 1996: Win: "Borderline"
  - 2005: Nomination: "Skein Dogs"

Ditmar Awards

- Best fan writer
  - 1979: Nomination
  - 1980: Win
  - 1981: Nomination
  - 1984: Nomination
  - 1998: Win
- Best Australian short fiction
  - 1981: Win: "Deus Ex Corporus"
  - 1981: Nomination: "Passages to Earth"
  - 1987: Nomination: "The Supramarket"
  - 1997: Nomination: "Borderline"
- Best short fiction
  - 1992: Nomination: "Olive Truffles"
  - 1994: Win: "Catalyst"
  - 1995: Nomination: "Jinx Ship"
  - 1995: Nomination: "Land's End"
  - 1996: Nomination: "Entropy"
