= Gavin O'Keefe =

Australian artist

Gavin L. O'Keefe
- Born: Melbourne, Australia
- Occupations: illustrator, author

Gavin L. O'Keefe is an Australian-born book illustrator and designer. He resided in the USA for a number of years, returning to live in Australia in 2018. O'Keefe has been the dustjacket designer and illustrator, and occasional commissioning editor, for US publisher Ramble House for 25 years.

== Biography ==
=== Early life ===
Gavin O'Keefe was born in Melbourne and lived in Sydney from the early-1980s to 1990. During that period, his artwork (usually black and white, though sometimes colour) was included in a variety of non-fiction books, science-fiction and horror magazines and other publications. His earliest covers were for books by Australian writers Jacob G. Rosenberg, Alex Skovron, Walter Adamson, and Ian Kennedy Williams.

O'Keefe is a classically trained musician and plays the viola.

=== Twentieth Century ===
O'Keefe's illustrative work has appeared in many publications, including Aphelion, Crypt of Cthulhu, Culture Magazine (illustrated serial "Down the Rabbit Hole"), Eidolon, Esoterica, Phantastique, Scarp, Shadowplay, 24 Hours (Australian Broadcasting Corporation), Terror Australis, Theosophy in Australia and Wildfire. He has also provided illustrations for anthologies such as Terror Australis: Best Australian Horror, and for The Australian H.P. Lovecraft Calendar 1990.

He contributed illustrations to Sally B. Boillotat's Polocrosse: Australian Made, Internationally Played (1990). His cover designs appear on Ian Kennedy Williams' Stopping Over (1988), Walter Adamson's The Man With the Suitcase (1989), Roslyn Taylor's Uncle Abe (1989), Peter Coaldrake and J.R. Nethercote's What Should Government Do? (1989) and John Leonard's Contemporary Australian Poetry: An Anthology. (1990)

Other works include Eight Illustrations for the Gormenghast Books by Mervyn Peake. . This was followed in 1995 by O'Keefe's illustrated version of Lewis Carroll's classic The Hunting of the Snark: An Agony in Eight Fits . His continued interest in illustrating Carroll is evinced by his 2004 compilation A Snark Selection (Ramble House).

O'Keefe's first illustrations for Lewis Carroll's Alice's Adventures In Wonderland (subtitled 'The GO Alice') were published in Melbourne in 1990 by the Carroll Foundation. In a review of this volume, it was stated "the hardbound volume intrigues the reader from the first glance at the mysterious black and red dustjacket. O'Keefe's illustrations are stark black and white drawings which have some of the foreboding one expects in Edgar Allan Poe. There is a humor here also, and though there is nothing particularly Australian about these drawings, there is much that we have not seen before, and the collector of innovative illustrated editions will certainly want to add this to his shelf." A new edition of 'The GO Alice' with entirely new illustrations was published by Ramble House in 2011.

O'Keefe has a longstanding interest in the art of Australian painters Norma Bull and Vali Myers. He has also written essays on writers and artists, such as "Sita and Salome: A Short Comparative Look at the Art of Aubrey Beardsley and Mervyn Peake" in Peake Studies 2, No 3 (Winter 1991) and "Alice's Odyssey in Oz", Oz Arts 7 (1993).

=== Twenty-First Century ===
O’Keefe has illustrated Philip José Farmer’s The Green Odyssey and Love Song, William Blake's An Island in the Moon (Purple Mouth Press), Aleister Crowley's The Poem and Leanne Frahm's Borderline (MirrorDanse Books). He designed the cover for the Lovecraftian novel Marblehead by Richard A. Lupoff, published by Ramble House, and cover designs for the novels of Harry Stephen Keeler. (O'Keefe is the cover designer at Ramble House and has been prolific in designing their covers since the turn of the century.) He is also one of the publisher's commissioning editors.

Time Line: Selected Illustrations (Ramble House, 2010) collects a range of O'Keefe's illustrations from his first four decades, including designs inspired by the macabre stories of H. P. Lovecraft, Tod Robbins and Edgar Allan Poe, illustrations for science-fiction works by Richard A. Lupoff, Robert Sheckley and Philip José Farmer, drawings for the ‘nonsense’ stories of Lewis Carroll and Edward Lear, drawings inspired by the music of King Crimson, Queen and Brian Eno, cover illustrations for mystery novels by Chelsea Quinn Yarbro, Mark Hansom, Walter S. Masterman, Richard E. Goddard and Arlton Eadie, and a range of fairy and fantasy art.

A new edition of L. Frank Baum's The Wonderful Wizard of Oz with O'Keefe's black-&-white illustrations was released by Ramble House in 2013; these illustrations follow the symbolism of Theosophy and the Tarot.

O'Keefe's English translation, with numerous black-&-white illustrations, of Lautréamont's Les Chants de Maldoror was published by Ramble House in 2018, entitled The Dirges of Maldoror.

Ramsey Campbell: Masters of the Weird Tale (Centipede Press, 2020) includes four new illustrations by O'Keefe, among a host of other illustrators.

O'Keefe is currently working on a third illustrated edition of Alice's Adventures in Wonderland, this time in 'radioactive' colour.

== Bibliography ==
- Lewis Carroll, The Hunting of the Snark (1993)
- William Blake, An Island in the Moon (Newport News, Virginia: Purple Mouth Press, 1998)
- Lewis Carroll, The Alice Books: Alice's Adventures in Wonderland & Through the Looking-Glass (Ramble House, 2011).
- Time Line: Selected Illustrations (Ramble House, 2010).

== Awards ==
- 2002 Sixth Annual Imitate Keeler Competition, for the story "Turn Up on Time!"
