= W. Chew 'Chewie' Chan =

W. Chew "Chewie" Chan is a professional storyboard and comic book artist known for his contributions to various projects, including Iron Man, Buckaroo Banzai, and Cthulhu Tales. His work has extended into the realm of film, with substantial involvement in productions like Superman Returns and Happy Feet.

Chan presently holds the position of Cnomics Consultant at Kinokuniya Bookstores in Australia. Previously, he served as the Graphic Novels Supervisor at Kennedy Miller Mitchell, where he played a significant role in the development of Warner Bros' Justice League Mortal and Astonishing Tales.
