= Bryce J. Stevens =

Australian writer and artist (born 1957)

B. J. Stevens
- Born: Bryce John Stevens; 10 September 1957 (age 69); Christchurch, New Zealand
- Occupations: Writer, artist
- Writing career
- Pen name: David Kuraria
- Period: 20th/21st century
- Genres: Horror, Dark Fantasy,
- Notable work: "Sisters of the Moss"

Bryce John Stevens (born 1957) is a horror writer, illustrator and editor. Born in Christchurch, New Zealand, he grew up in Hamilton, New Zealand, Marlborough District and Pelorus Sound attending primarily Maori/Pacific Islands schools. From childhood he was fascinated with the supernatural and terrifying consequences of events from stories such as "The Tinderbox", a predilection which continued through his high school years and beyond. After living in Auckland for some time, he moved to Sydney in the mid-1980s. In the early 2000s, Stevens discovered he was of Maori heritage.

== Editorial career ==
Between 1987 and 1992 he co-edited (with Christopher Sequeira and Leigh Blackmore) Terror Australis (1987–92). A column by Stevens, "Every Time the Candle Burns", appeared in Issues 1 and 3 of Terror Australis, and he reviewed books under both his own name and the pseudonym of David Kuraria for the magazine's "In the Bad Books" column. Stevens was the basis for the character 'Doc Martin' as drawn and photographed in various of Sequeira's occult detective graphic novel series, Deadlocke and Doc Martin (in Pulse of Darkness and elsewhere).

Stevens contributed interior art to numerous horror magazines in the 1990s in Australia and also cover art for issues of E.O.D, Shoggoth and Bloodsongs.

In the mid-1990s Stevens moved to Melbourne, where he was a key figure (with Steven Proposch and Chris A. Masters) in the Melbourne Horror Society (later known as The Australian Horror Writers) - a forerunner to the Australian Horror Writers Association) - where he helped produce Bloodsongs (1994–95) magazine. From 1996 through 1998, Stevens was President of the Australian Horror Writers. He edited issues 5-11 of its official newsletter Severed Head

== Writings and Art ==
In 1999, he held his solo art show, the "Screw the Millennium Bug Exhibition" at Melbourne's Blue Velvet Lounge. His story of the same year, "Rookwood" (Aurealis No 24, 1999) is a collaboration with Rick Kennett and is currently available in the e-book Forbidden Texts (ed. David Bain (CreateSpace, 2013). In the late 1990s he produced several issues of a personal zine, Choking Dog Gazette. Originally a hardcopy zine, the title was revived in 2012 as an online zine; later issues were distributed through the SSWFT amateur press association.

Stevens has published several small press collections of horror stories (see below).

His short stories have also appeared in Black Moon, Bloodsongs, Cold Cuts, Dead By Dawn, E.O.D, Forbidden Tomes, Cthulhu and the Co-Eds: Kids & Squids, Midnight Echo, Misanthrope, Octavia, Outside, and Terror Australis. (magazine and book anthology). Stevens is noted for his hard-edged and uncompromising horror content; however he often delves into black humour and amongst his most reprinted stories are a Lovecraftian parody called "The Diary of Howard Clark Long Phillips"and "Payday" . Some of his horror stories show a black humour reminiscent of a cross between Ben Elton and Joe R. Lansdale. One of his most acclaimed stories is "Sisters of the Moss", most recently reprinted in Orb No 8 (The Best of Orb 1–7) and in the author's Stalking the Demon: Tales of Sex and Insanity.

In 2001, Stevens compiled The Fear Codex, an encyclopedic reference book on Australian dark fantasy and horror writers and artists, which was released by Jacobyte Books on CD-ROM only. In a lengthy review of this work, Rick Kennett concluded: "In later days The Fear Codex will be the work from where research into Australian horror and dark fantasy will start." A 2003 trip to the Chatham Islands re-inspired him with the lifestyle and scenes of his childhood, which have always featured in his fiction

Stevens lived again in Sydney from 2004 to 2008. His artwork of that period includes work for the metal band Inslain (see Sadistik Exekution).

== Recent career ==
In 2009, Stevens relocated to Johns River City of Greater Taree NSW, where he worked as an on-call handler of venomous reptiles. He continues to draw and paint, and holds regular exhibitions of his work in different cities in Australia. He has controversially used his own blood in some of his paintings which he refers to as "blood works". A novel in progress as The Malign Comedy became the novella "The Absurd Quest of Thomas Wu" (published in Bedding the Lamia: Tropical Horrors (IFWG, 2023)).

Stevens has been writing horror tales under the pen name 'David Kuraria' since 2015.

In recent years, Stevens has co-edited a number of horror anthologies published by IFWG Publishing in collaboration with Steven Proposch and Christopher Sequeira. These include Cthulhu Deep Down Under, Cthulhu Land of the Long White Cloud,, War of the Worlds: Battleground Australia, and Caped Fear: Superhuman Horror Stories.

Recent stories have also appeared in a number of Australian horror anthologies. His work has appeared in Ellen Datlow's Year's Best Horror Honourable Mentions and recommended Reading lists on multiple occasions.

== Collections ==
- Strange Vistas (Borderland Press, 1984). Limited ed collection of artwork only; no stories.
- Pale Flesh: Stories of the Macabre (Borderland Press, 1989). Limited chapbook of 3 stories, all reprinted in later collections. Cover art hand-coloured by Stevens.
- Visions of Torment: Stories of Horror (Spine Publications, 1993). Collects seven stories published in magazines, with one new tale, "Pray for the Prey." Two stories are retitled from earlier appearances. Illustrated by the author. Covert art by Kurt Stone.
- Skin Tight (Bambada Press, 1995) . 300 numbered copies. Collects seven tales, a couple retitled from earlier appearances. Introduction by Christopher Sequeira.
- Stalking the Demon: Tales of Sex and Insanity (Jacobyte Books, 2002). Features cover art by Stevens. . Collection of 17 mainly new tales, includes two reprints and a revised reprint of "Desperation Point."
- Bedding the Lamia: Tropical Horrors (IFWG Publishing, 2023) (as by 'David Kuraria'). Four tales, includes the long novella "The Absurd Quest of Thomas Wu." Two previously published tales and two new. Cover art by Luke Spooner.

== Uncollected works ==
- Review of Stephen Jones (ed), Shadows Over Innsmouth. Skintomb (1994).
- "A Humorous Look at Sex in Horror" (nf). Severed Head 4 (April 1994), 8–9.
- "Bandages" (ss) Bloodsongs #6 (1995)
- "Sleep Deprivation and Its Consequences." (nf) Severed Head 9 (July 1995).
- "Clark Ashton Smith". Acrostic. Black Moon 4 (1995).
- "Arthur Machen". Acrostic. Black Moon 4 (1995).
- "Behind the Fear Codex" (nf) Orb Speculative Fiction #2 (2001)
- "The Lord of Lewd: Clark Ashton Smith and the Fiction of Fornication". [Parody]. Mantichore 2, No 1 (Dec 2006).
- "Of Caves, Dark Holes and Vaginas: The Pornographic Prose of the Providence Poet". [Parody re H.P. Lovecraft.)Mantichore 2, No 1 (Dec 2006)
- "Two Acrostics on H.P. Lovecraft". Mantichore 2, No 2 (March 2007). [Poetry].
- "And They Shall Suffer for Their Art" (ss).Midnight Echo 5 (Feb 2011).

== Magazines edited or co-edited ==
- Terror Australis (1988–92)(with Leigh Blackmore and Chris Sequeira)
- Bloodsongs (1993–98). (with Steven Proposch and Chris A. Masters)
- Severed Head: Newsletter of the Horror Writers of Australia (1994–96)
- Choking Dog Gazette (fanzine, 1998–2012). Issue No 4 was the final print issue; Issues 5-13 were online only.

== Other works ==
- Proposch, Steve; Sequeira, Christopher; Stevens, Bryce, eds. (2017). Cthulhu deep down under. Vol. 1. Campbell, Ramsey (writer of introduction); based on HP Lovecraft's Call of Cthulhu. IFWG Publishing Australia. ISBN 978-1-925496-45-1. "Celebrated horror writer H. P. Lovecraft's first major tale of his Cthulhu Mythos began an entire sub-genre of the macabre, and in that story he made Australia a crucial location in his supernatural universe. Now, a group of Australia's most accomplished writers of speculative fiction return to the promise of the master..."
- Proposch, Steve; Sequeira, Christopher; Stevens, Bryce, eds. (2018). Cthulhu deep down under. Vol. 2. Rawlik, Peter (writer of introduction); based on HP Lovecraft's Call of Cthulhu. IFWG Publishing Australia. ISBN 9781925496994. "H. P. Lovecraft pioneered a fusion of terror and science fiction themes, and is widely credited as having invented the sub-genre of 'cosmic horror'. While America's New England was the focus and setting for many of Lovecraft's tales, the Southern Hemisphere held a fascination for him. Australia, New Zealand and Antarctica were featured locations in his Mythosian novellas...."
- As editor/compiler. The Australian H.P. Lovecraft Centenary Calendar 1990-1991. Sydney: Terror Australis, 1990.
- Strange Vistas (1991) Artwork.
- As editor/compiler/artist (with Kurt Stone). Razor Caress Calendar 1992-93 (Spine Publications). Featuring art by Stevens, Kurt Stone, Antoinette Rydyr and Steve 'Carnage' Carter.
- As editor/compiler. The Fear Codex: The Australian Encyclopedia of Dark Fantasy and Horror (2001)(CD-ROM)
- "Kurtus Interruptus". An interview with Australian comics artist Kurt Stone. Boodsongs 4 (Autumn 1995)
