= Rick Kennett =

Australian writer

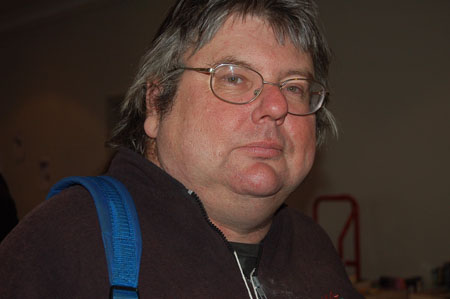
- Kennett in 2007
- Born: 1956 (age 69–70); Melbourne, Australia
- Occupation: Writer
- Writing career
- Genres: Horror, Dark Fantasy, Science Fiction
- Website: fire.prohosting.com/rkennett

Rick Kennett (born 1956) is an Australian writer of science fiction, horror and ghost stories. He is the most prolific and widely published genre author in Australia after Paul Collins, Terry Dowling and Greg Egan, with stories in a wide variety of magazines and anthologies in Australia, the US and the UK.

His first published short story was "Troublesome Green" (Enigma, Jan 1979). His second story, "Ace!" also appeared in Enigma (Dec 1979).

A number of his stories have been printed multiple times due to his habit of resubmission – for instance, "Isle of the Dancing Dead" and "The Battle of Leila the Dog".

A number of his ghost stories feature the recurring character Ernie Pine, known as "the reluctant ghost-hunter". An excerpt of an intended novel featuring Pine, Abracadabra, appeared in Bloodsongs 2 (1994). Retitled The Devil and the Deep Blue Sea, the novel was published by Cooperative Press in 2013.

Another continuing character in his work is the lesbian "trained killer for the state" Cy De Gerch, the heroine of his novel Presumed Dead and the collection Thirty Minutes for New Hell.

Some of Kennett's work is science fiction, but some of his science fiction stories feature ghosts, thus his work crosses genre boundaries that are often kept separate.

Kennett was an early contributor to The Australian Horror and Fantasy Magazine and also had stories published in its successor Terror Australis and the anthology Terror Australis: The Best of Australian Horror. Several stories by Kennett including "Out of the Storm", his story from the Terror Australis anthology, have been produced as audio productions at The Dunesteef Audio Fiction Magazine:

He has collaborated on occasion with other Australian writers of horror, for instance Barry Radburn, Paul Collins and Bryce J. Stevens.

The St James Guide to Horror, Ghost and Gothic Writers points out that Kennett is "really the one Australian writer to have produced a substantial body of work in the ghost-story field" – while Rob Hood and Terry Dowling have also produced significant quantities of ghost stories, Kennett's concentration on the genre makes him the leading specialist in Australia.

Reggie Oliver, reviewing 472 Cheyne Walk: Carnacki, the Untold Stories, has called Kennett "prodigally inventive" and Peter Worthy of Black Book webzine has called the book "a dazzling continuation of William Hope Hodgson's Carnacki the Ghost-Finder"

Kennett worked as possibly the longest-serving motorbike courier in Australia. He retired in 2022.

== Bibliography ==
=== Novels ===
- The Devil and the Deep Blue Sea (Cooperative Ink, 2013) (Ernie Pine series)
- In Quinn's Paddock (Cooperative Ink, 2016)
- Presumed Dead (Cooperative Ink, 2016)

=== Collections ===
- The Reluctant Ghost-Hunter (UK: Ghost Story Society, 1991)
- No. 472 Cheyne Walk (UK: Ghost Story Society, 1992) (with A. F. 'Chico' Kidd)
- Thirteen: Ghost Stories (Jacobyte Books, 2001)
- 472 Cheyne Walk: Carnacki, the Untold Stories (with A.F. 'Chico' Kidd) (Ash-Tree Press, 2002)
- The Dark and What It Said (Cooperative Ink, 2016)
- Thirty Minutes for New Hell (Cooperative Ink, 2016)

=== Short fiction ===
- "In Quinn's Paddock" (2003) in Southern Blood: New Australian Tales of the Supernatural (ed. Bill Congreve)
- "The Dark and What It Said" (2007) in Andromeda Spaceways Inflight Magazine #28 (ed. Zara Baxter)

== Awards ==
=== Wins ===
- 1992 EOD magazine Best Short Story Award (for "Dead Air"), .
- 2008 Ditmar Award: Short Fiction: "The Dark and What it Said"
- 2013 Parsec (podcast award) large cast, short form "The Road to Utopia Plain"
- 2013 Parsec (podcast award) single reader, short form "Now Cydonia"

=== Nominations ===
- 2008 Ditmar Award, Short story: "The Dark and What It Said"
- 2008 Aurealis Award, Horror short story: "The Dark and What It Said"
- 2002 Ditmar Award: Short fiction: "Whispers" (with Paul Collins) Note: Story appeared in Collins' collection Stalking Midnight(Cosmos Books).
- 2002 Aurealis Award: Horror short story: "Whispers" (with Paul Collins)
- 1998 Ditmar Award: Short fiction: "The Willcroft Inheritance" (with Paul Collins)
- 1993 Ditmar Award: Short fiction: "The Seas of Castle Hill Road"
