= Science Fiction (Australian magazine) =

Australian science fiction journal

Science Fiction: A Review of Speculative Literature is a long-running critical science fiction journal published in Australia by science fiction academic Van Ikin from the University of Sydney and later the University of Western Australia. Contributing editors have included writer Terry Dowling (who also did important reviewing and critical work in early issues) and book collector and reviewer Keith Curtis.

According to John Clute and Peter Nicholls, "Intended to be a reputable academic journal, as the editorial addresses suggest, SF: ARoSL has oscillated a little uneasily between the academic and the fannish, but has nevertheless published good critical features. Until the more regular and perhaps livelier Australian Science Fiction Review: Second Series appeared in 1986, this was the main repository for Australian sf criticism (especially since its main rival, SF Commentary, was notably irregular in the 1980s), publishing interesting material by its editors by Russell Blackford, George Turner and others."

== Editions ==
The first issue appeared in 1977. By 1990, 30 issues had been published. Currently the journal distributes new material at less-than-annual intervals.

As of 2026, the most recent issue, Science Fiction #57, was released in 2025.

== Contributors ==
Contributors over the years have included the following:

- Bruce Gillespie
- Russell Blackford
- Terry Dowling
- Richard Harland
- Peter McNamara
- Stephen Dedman

== Cover artists ==
Cover artwork for Science Fiction has been contributed predominantly by Dane Ikin and Nick Stathopoulos.
