= Van Ikin =

Australian academic and science fiction writer

Van Ikin (born 25 November 1951) is an academic and science fiction writer and editor. A professor in English at the University of Western Australia, he retired from teaching in 2015 and is now a senior honorary research fellow. He has acted as supervisor for several Australian writers completing their post-graduate degrees and doctorates — including science fiction and fantasy writers Terry Dowling, Stephen Dedman, and Dave Luckett — and received the university's Excellence in Teaching Award for Postgraduate Research Supervision in 2000.

Ikin is probably best known for his editorship of the long-running critical journal Science Fiction. He has reviewed science fiction and fantasy for The Sydney Morning Herald since 1984.

== Critical works ==
- Strange Constellations: A History of Australian Science Fiction (with Russell Blackford & Sean McMullen). Greenwood Press, 1998.
- Warriors of the Tao: The Best of Science Fiction: A Review of Speculative Literature (with Damien Broderick). Borgo Press, 2011.
- Xeno Fiction: More Best of Science Fiction: A Review of Speculative Literature (with Damien Broderick). Wildside/Borgo, 2013.
- Fantastika at the Edge of Reality: Yet More Best of Science Fiction: A Review of Speculative Literature (with Damien Broderick). Wildside, 2014.
- Other Spacetimes: Interviews with Speculative Fiction Writers (with Damien Broderick). Wildside, 2015.

== Magazines edited ==
- Enigma (University of Sydney SF Association, 1972–79)
- Science Fiction (Issues 1-55/56, 1977-2024)

== Anthologies edited ==
- Australian Science Fiction (University of Queensland Press, 1981; reprint, Academy Editions, US, 1984).
- Glass Reptile Breakout (Centre for Studies in Aust Literature, University of WA, 1990).
- Mortal Fire: Best Australian SF (with Terry Dowling) (Hodder/Coronet, 1993).

== Awards ==
- Australian Science Fiction Foundation, Chandler Award for his contribution to Australian science fiction (1992).
