= Ditmar Award =

Australian Science Fiction Achievement Award

- Awarded for: Excellence in science fiction, fantasy, and horror
- Country: Australia
- Presented by: Australian National Science Fiction Convention
- First award: 1969
- Website: Official website (archived copy)

The Ditmar Award (formally the Australian SF ("Ditmar") Award; formerly the "Australian Science Fiction Achievement Award") has been awarded annually since 1969 at the Australian National Science Fiction Convention (the "Natcon") to recognise achievement in Australian science fiction (including fantasy and horror) and science fiction fandom. The award is similar to the Hugo Award but on a national rather than international scale.

They are named for Martin James Ditmar "Dick" Jenssen, an Australian fan and artist, who financially supported the awards at their inception.

The current rules for the award (which had for many years been specified only in the minimalist "Jack Herman constitution") were developed in 2000 and 2001 as a result of controversy resulting from the withdrawal of the works of several prominent writers from eligibility, and the rules are subject to revision by the "Business Meeting" of the Natcon.

== Process ==
Award-eligible works and persons are first nominated by "natural persons active in fandom, or from full or supporting members of the national convention of the year of the award". Nominations are compiled into a ballot (currently by a sub-committee composed primarily of standing committee members elected at the National SF Convention business meeting) which is distributed to members of the convention, and the previous year's convention, for voting, which may continue into the period of the convention ("at-Con voting") at the discretion of the committee.

Finalists are given a certificate honouring their achievement and winners are presented with a trophy.

=== 1991 ===
In 1991 trophies were presented twice. The original trophies were in the form of stuffed cane toads.

=== 2000 ===
In 2000 the awards were cancelled and re-run, resulting in two sets of nominations that year.

The second set of nominations included Greg Egan's Teranesia as a finalist for the Ditmar Award for Best Novel despite Egan having attempted to decline nomination of his work. It was determined that an author could refuse an award, but not a nomination. Accordingly, Egan's novel remained on the ballot, and was permitted to win the award, which he then declined. Egan had earlier attempted to withdraw all his works "into the indefinite future" from consideration for the Ditmar Awards in order to give himself greater freedom to state his views on the awards process.

== Categories ==
Categories were traditionally the prerogative of the convention committee (a situation which ultimately led to presentation of an Award for Best Fannish Cat) and regularly included "international" categories. This situation was changed by the formalisation of the categories as part of the rules.

=== Current awards ===
- Best Novel
- Best Novella or Novelette
- Best Short Story
- Best Collected Work
- Best Artwork
- Best Fan Writer
- Best Fan Artist
- Best Fan Publication in any Medium
- Best New Talent
- William Atheling Jr. Award for Criticism or Review

The current rules permit merger of the Best Novella or Novelette and Best Short Story categories into a single category for Best Short Fiction.

=== History of Categories ===
When the Awards were first presented in 1969, there were four categories:

- Best Australian Science Fiction of any length, or collection
- Best International Science Fiction of any length, or collection
- Best Contemporary Writer of Science Fiction
- Best Australian Amateur Science Fiction Publication or Fanzine

There continued to be at least one "International" category and multiple "Australian" categories until 1986, except that in 1974 there were no Ditmar Awards, and that in 1982 "Australasian" replaced "Australian" in category names. (Those two complications are ignored in the following summary.)

International Categories A category for Best International Fiction survived until 1986, and there was also an award in that category in 1989. An award for Best Contemporary Author that did not require nominees to be Australian was presented in 1969. An award for Best International Publication was presented in 1970. The William Atheling Jr Award when it was introduced in 1976, did not require nominees to be Australian, whereas it now does. (Also, it has, rightly or wrongly, not always been regarded as a Ditmar Award.)

Australian Fiction Apart from there being an award for Best Professional Magazine in 1970, there was a single category for Best Australian Fiction until 1977, in which year there was also a special award for a specific short story. For most years from 1978 to 1998, there were two categories for Australian fiction, one for Best Australian Short Fiction and one either for Best Australian Long Fiction or, more specifically, for Best Australian Novel. (There was a single category for Best Australian Fiction in 1979, 1980 and 1983. In 1993, there was an additional award for Best Periodical; In 1996, there was one for best Publication/Fanzine/Periodical.) From 1999 to 2003, there were awards in three categories, that for Best Long Fiction having been split into one for Novels and one for Collected Works. (In 1999, the latter category was phrased as being for Best Australian Magazine or Anthology.) From 2004, the Best Short Fiction category has been split into one for Best Novella or Novelette and one for Best Short Story.

Australian Fan Publications There has continued to be an award category in which fanzines are eligible, for many years termed Best Australian Fanzine. From 2002 to 2004 and 2006 to 2008, there were two categories for fan publications, one for fanzines and one not. In 1993, the category in which fanzines were eligible was one for Best Periodical; in 1996, it was a category for Best Publication/Fanzine/Periodical; in 2001, it was a category for Best Australian Fan Production. Nowadays, there is a category for Best Australian Fan Publication in any Medium.

William Atheling Jr Award The William Atheling Jr Award, for reviews or criticism, has been presented in most years since 1976. This was originally not considered a Ditmar Award, but has subsequently become classified as one.

Fan Writer There has been an award category for Best Australian Fan Writer in most years since 1979.

Artist There was an award category for Best Australian Science Fiction or Fantasy Artist from 1980 to 1987. In 1983 and 1984, there was also an award category for Best Australian Science Fiction or Fantasy Cartoonist. In 1998, there was an award for Best Artwork/Artist.

Artwork There was an award category for Best Dramatic Presentation in 1973, 1985 and 1998. There has been an award either for Best Artwork or Best Professional Artwork since 1993. (In 2005 and 2008, there was an award for Best Fan Art.)

Editor From 1983 to 1985, there was an award category for Best Australian Science Fiction or Fantasy Editor.

Outstanding Contribution In 1987 only, a Ditmar Award was presented for Outstanding Contribution to Australian Fandom.

Fan Artist There has been an award category for Best Fan Artist in most years since 1988. In 2005 and 2008, awards were announced for Best Fan Art instead of Best Fan Artist.

Fannish Cat In 1991 only there was a Ditmar Award for Best Fannish Cat. In 2010, there was an award for Best Fannish Cat, but it was not a Ditmar Award that year.

New Talent There has been an award category for Best New Talent since 2001.

Achievements In most of the years from 2001 to 2008, there were awards for Best Professional Achievement and for Best Fan Achievement. These two categories were merged into a single category for Best Achievement in the years 2009 to 2011. These categories have been discontinued.

Special Awards (not necessarily in all cases Ditmar Awards) have been presented at Ditmar Award ceremonies, including those held in 1971, 1977, 1983, 1985, 1992 and 1995.
