= The Best Australian Science Fiction Writing: A Fifty Year Collection =

SF Anthology edited by Rob Gerrand

- Editor: Rob Gerrand
- Language: English
- Genre: SF anthology
- Publisher: Black Inc
- Publication date: 2004
- Publication place: Australia
- Media type: Print
- Pages: 615pp.
- ISBN: 9781863953016

The Best Australian Science Fiction Writing: A Fifty Year Collection (2004) is an anthology of science fiction stories edited by the Australian writer Rob Gerrand.

Russell Blackford, in his introduction to the anthology, stated: "As you will soon discover Australian science fiction has much to tell us about ourselves, our country and the world."

== Contents ==
The anthology contains 31 stories of varying lengths, by Australian authors.

- "Infant Prodigy", Frank B. Bryning
- "The Cage", A. Bertram Chandler
- "Debt of Lassor", N. K. Hemming
- "The Doorway", Wynne Whiteford
- "Parky", David Rome
- "All Laced Up", A. Bertram Chandler
- "The Case of the Perjured Planet", Martin Loran
- "There is a Crooked Man", Jack Wodhams
- "The Final Weapon", Damien Broderick
- "Dancing Gerontius", Lee Harding
- "The Man of Slow Feeling", Michael Wilding
- "Re-Deem the Time", David J. Lake
- "In a Petri Dish Upstairs", George Turner
- "The Chance", Peter Carey
- "The Paradigm", Randal Flynn
- "Inhabiting the Interspaces", Philippa Maddern
- "Odd Man Search", Cherry Wilder
- "The Government in Exile", Paul Collins
- "The Total Devotion Machine", Rosaleen Love
- "The Caress", Greg Egan
- "Red Ochre", Lucy Sussex
- "The Soap Bubble", Sean Williams
- "Angel Thing", Petrina Smith
- "The Sword of God", Russell Blackford
- "Niagara Falling", Janeen Webb and Jack Dann
- "A Walk-On Part in the War", Stephen Dedman
- "He Tried to Catch the Light", Terry Dowling
- "The Boy Who Didn't Yearn", Margo Lanagan
- "The Diamond Pit", Jack Dann
- "Tower of Wings", Sean McMullen

== Critical reception ==
A reviewer at QBD Books noted: "These outstanding stories show that the best writing today is speculative, and that the best science fiction has long burst the boundaries of outer space. This book will be a bible for all lovers of science fiction, and an excellent introduction for all those so far unacquainted with this fascinating genre."

Bruce Gillespie in Steam Engine Time 4 concluded his review: "My fifty-year journey through Australian SF is slightly different from Rob Gerrand's, but I’m satisfied that we have been looking back at the same timescape. For some of these writers, I would have chosen other stories. I might have chosen stories from the time gaps I've mentioned. But whatever its limitations, this fifty-year collection is an essential record of the long, rocky journey of Australian SF writing. Better, for me, it's the record of some achievements by people I grew up knowing and admiring."

A reviewer in The Age stated: "It may well be difficult to identify what is 'Australian' about Australian SF. The first few stories in this anthology themselves have nothing to say about this country, tending instead to project the kind of universalisms to which SF still generically aspires...The future shock, post-Hiroshima fallout themes of the early Australian SF here speak to a broad unease with the technological and social developments of modernity rather than anything local. There are even a couple of 'hospital dystopia' stories here, with patients getting "rehabilitated" in institutions that could be anywhere in the world...In this anthology, Australian SF can find itself in ancient Troy, in medieval Scotland, in the Aboriginal Dreamtime and aboard a parody of the USS Enterprise. If nothing else, it certainly gets around."

== See also ==
- 2004 in Australian literature
