= The Cage (Chandler story) =

Short story by A. Bertram Chandler

- Short story by A. Bertram Chandler
- Country: Australia
- Language: English
- Genre: Science fiction

Publication
- Published in: The Magazine of Fantasy and Science Fiction
- Publication type: Periodical
- Media type: Print
- Publication date: June 1957

"The Cage" is a science fiction short story by A. Bertram Chandler. It was first published in the June 1957 issue of The Magazine of Fantasy and Science Fiction, and, in the following month, July 1957, in an issue of Authentic Science Fiction. It was later included in many science fiction anthologies, including The Best Australian Science Fiction Writing : A Fifty Year Collection edited by Rob Gerrand.

== Plot summary ==
The passengers and crew of the Lode Star spaceship find themselves stranded on an isolated planet after their main drive malfunctions and then explodes, destroying the ship. Sometime later they are discovered by another alien species who capture a number of the humans, transport them to another planet and place them in a glass cage, presumably for study. Try as they might the humans are unable to convince the aliens that they are intelligent beings until they solve one minor problem only to inadvertently solve their major one.

== Further publications ==
- The Best from Fantasy and Science Fiction, Seventh Series edited by Anthony Boucher (1958)
- 12 Great Classics of Science Fiction edited by Groff Conklin (1963)
- 16 Science-Fiction Stories edited by Anthony Boucher (1964)
- Yet More Penguin Science Fiction edited by Brian W. Aldiss (1964)
- The Penguin Science Fiction Omnibus edited by Brian W. Aldiss (1973)
- Anthropology Through Science Fiction edited by Martin Harry Greenberg, Carol Mason and Paricia Warrick (1974)
- Criminal Justice Through Science Fiction edited by Martin Harry Greenberg and Joseph D. Olander (1977)
- Fontein Science Fiction 3 edited by Brian W. Aldiss (1978)
- Science Fiction of the Fifties edited by Martin Harry Greenberg and Joseph D. Olander (1979)
- Science Fiction A-Z : A Dictionary of the Great S.F. Themes edited by Isaac Asimov, Martin H. Greenberg and Charles G. Waugh
- The Penguin World Omnibus of Science Fiction edited by Brian W. Aldiss and Sam J. Lundwall (1986)
- The Great SF Stories No. 19 (1957) edited by Isaac Asimov and Martin H. Greenberg
- From Sea to Shining Star by A. Bertram Chandler (1990)
- Space Stories edited by Mike Ashley (1996)
- The Random House Book of Science Fiction Stories edited by Mike Ashley (1997)
- The Best Australian Science Fiction Writing : A Fifty Year Collection edited by Rob Gerrand (2004)
- A Science Fiction Omnibus edited by Brian W. Aldiss (2007)
- Worst Contact edited by Hank Davis (2016)

The story was translated into French (1958), Japanese (1960), German (1964), Swedish (1977), Polish (1977), Dutch (1978), Croatian (1982), Italian (1987), Russian (1988), and Romanian (1988).

== Critical reception ==
Bruce Gillespie in Steam Engine Time 4 called the story "sharp" with "a memorable twist ending."

== Notes ==
In Australian Science Fiction Review 8 Chandler writes about hearing his story described on New Zealand radio as tackling the problem of communication with alien cultures "in a very ingenius manner".

When writing to the Science Fiction Writers of America (SFWA) Forum magazine in April 1974, Chandler notes the possible "over-anthologization" of his story.

== See also ==
- Australian science fiction
- 1957 in Australian literature
