= Chandler Award =

Australian science fiction prize

The Chandler Award is presented by the Australian Science Fiction Foundation for "Outstanding Achievement in Australian Science Fiction". It is named in recognition of the contribution that science fiction writer A. Bertram Chandler made to Australian science fiction, and because of his patronage of the Foundation.

Unlike the Ditmars, this award is decided upon by a jury and, although nominally an annual award presented in conjunction with the Australian National Science Fiction Convention, is not necessarily presented every year.

The first Chandler Award was presented in 1992 to Van Ikin at the National Science Fiction Convention - SynCon '92.

== Winners ==
Year	Winner	Ref.
1992	Van Ikin	
1993	Merv Binns	
1994	George Turner	
1995	Wynne Whiteford	
1996	Grant Stone	
1997	Susan Batho	
1999	Graham Stone	
2001	John Bangsund	
2002	John Foyster	
2003	Lucy Sussex	
2006	Lee Harding	
2007	Bruce Gillespie	
2009	Rosaleen Love	
2010	Damien Broderick	
2011	Paul Collins	
2012	Richard Harland	
2013	Russell B. Farr	
2014	Danny Oz	
2015	Donna Maree Hanson	
2016	James Allen	
2017	Bill Wright	
2018	Edwina Harvey	
2019	Alan Stewart	
2020	Gillian Polack	
2021	Perry Middlemiss	
