= From Sea to Shining Star =

1990 short story collection by Australian writer A. Bertram Chandler

- Author: A. Bertram Chandler, edited by Keith Curtis and Susan Chandler
- Cover artist: Nick Stathopolous
- Language: English
- Genre: Science fiction
- Publisher: Dreamstone
- Publication date: 1990
- Publication place: Australia
- Media type: Print
- Pages: 342 pp.
- ISBN: 0958796807

From Sea to Shining Star (1990) is a limited edition science fiction short story collection by Australian writer A. Bertram Chandler, edited by Keith Curtis and Susan Chandler.

== Contents ==
The collection consists of 30 short stories, plus an introductory essay by the editors and a bibliography of the author.

- "Sea Change"
- "Shadow Before"
- "Precession"
- "Castaway"
- "Change of Heart"
- "Not Quite the Noblest"
- "As It Was in the Beginning"
- "What's In a Name?"
- "The Word"
- "All Laced Up"
- "The Pied Potter"
- "What Would You Do?"
- "The Hairy Parents"
- "Sense of Wonder"
- "Long Way"
- "Critical Angle"
- "Artifact"
- "Jetsam"
- "Moonfall"
- "The Idol"
- "Hindsight"
- "The Last Hunt"
- "Seeing Eye"
- "The Soul Machine"
- "Journey's End"
- "Finishing Touch"
- "Man Alone"
- "The Cage"
- "The Kingsolving's Planet Irregulars"
- "Giant Killer"

== Critical reception ==
Wynne Whitford, writing in SF Commentary noted: "The overall concept of this collection of the stories of 'Jack' Chandler, as he was known to his friends, suggests a gradually developing extrapolation from seafaring tales to the exploration of humanity’s future in outer space...Whether he is dealing with deep space or the sea, Chandler tells a gripping story."

In The New York Review of Science Fiction George Turner found the book to be "handsome enough to grace any shelf but, rather than offer an outsize tome with spectacular decoration, they have chosen a fairly plain format which matches Bert Chandler’s no-nonsense attitudes and filled it with something like 190,000 words of stories". He went on: "It would be foolish to pretend that Bert Chandler was one of the greatest writers of the genre. In fact his scientific imagination was small and his innovative gift: limited — but he was a born storyteller who knew precisely what to put in, what to leave out, and where to plant the subtle detail that would turn the ordinary into the extraordinary."

== Publication history ==
The book was published by Canberra's Barb de la Hunty under the imprint Dreamstone Publishing. Two editions of From Sea to Shining Star were published, one as collector's edition of 100 copies (signed by the editors and artist) and the other as a standard, numbered edition of 400 copies (numbered 101-500).

== Awards ==
- The collection was shortlisted for the Australian Sf Achievement Award for "Best Novel or Collection" in 1992.

== See also ==
- 1990 in Australian literature
