= All Laced Up =

Short story by A. Bertram Chandler

- Short story by A. Bertram Chandler
- Country: Australia
- Language: English
- Genre: Science fiction

Publication
- Published in: New Worlds
- Publication type: Periodical
- Publisher: Nova Publications
- Media type: Print
- Publication date: November 1961

"All Laced Up" is a science fiction short story by A. Bertram Chandler. It was first published in the November 1961 issue of New Worlds, and later included in several science fiction anthologies, including The Best Australian Science Fiction Writing : A Fifty Year Collection edited by Rob Gerrand.

The story was originally published under the author's pseudonym of George Whitley.

== Plot summary ==
A husband and wife, living in Sydney, New South Wales, decide to purchase some iron lace-work to use as a decorative divider in their house. They find a dealer, purchase some rather strange lace-work cheap and instal it. That night they are visited by a woman from the future who explains what the lace-work really is.

== Further publications ==
- Lambda 1 and Other Stories edited by John Carnell (1964)
- The Pacific Book of Australian SF edited by John Baxter (1968)
- Australian Science Fiction 1 edited by John Baxter (1975)
- From Sea to Shining Star by A. Bertram Chandler (1990)
- Mortal Fire: Best Australian SF edited by Terry Dowling and Van Ikin (1993)
- The Best Australian Science Fiction Writing : A Fifty Year Collection edited by Rob Gerrand (2004)

The story was translated into German in 1966.

== Critical reception ==
Bruce Gillespie in Steam Engine Time 4 stated: "Today's reader might find the theme of alien visitation all too familiar, but it is difficult to emphasise how daring Chandler was to set his story in the Sydney he knew so well — the inner suburbs with their lace ironwork decorations, which were just becoming fashionable — and to have his main characters resemble closely himself and his wife. Until then, most Australian short stories had to be set in a never-never land, or somewhere in Britain or America."

In Science Fiction Commentary 23, critic George Turner stated that "Chandler has been content to do what he knows he can do well. He is at all times an unpretentious writer who stays within his limits and rarely turns out a failure. This is backbone s f, the solid and unspectacular work which forms the springboard from which the more adventurous launch their flights. Without the Chandlers to hold the s f line the Sturgeons and Aldisses and Delanys might never have been heard of."

== See also ==
- Australian science fiction
- 1961 in Australian literature
