= Norstrilia Press =

Australian small press book publisher

Norstilia Press
- Founder: Rob Gerrand, Bruce Gillespie, Carey Handfield
- Country of origin: Australia
- Headquarters location: St. Kilda, Victoria
- Publication types: Books
- Fiction genres: science fiction/crime/non-fiction
- Official website: https://www.norstriliapress.com/

Norstrilia Press is a small press publishing house based in St. Kilda, Victoria, Australia. It was established in 1975 prior to Aussiecon, Australia's first world science fiction convention, by Rob Gerrand, Bruce Gillespie and Carey Handfield. Its primary aim was to publish science fiction, fantasy, critical essay collections and other genre works that were unlikely to see publication by other publishers.

The press took its name from an imaginary planet from the works of Cordwainer Smith, an American author who was, for a time, resident in Australia. In Smith's fictional universe, "Nortstrilia" is the name given to the planet "Old North Australia".

== Works published by Norstrilia Press ==
This is a chronological list of books published by Norstrilia Press.

=== 1975 ===
- Philip K Dick: Electric Shepherd edited by Bruce Gillespie

=== 1976 ===
- The Altered I : An Encounter with Science Fiction edited by Lee Harding

=== 1977 ===
- The View From the Edge : A Workshop of Science Fiction Stories edited by George Turner

=== 1979 ===
- The Moon in the Ground by Keith Antill

=== 1980 ===
- The Dreaming Dragons : A Time Opera by Damien Broderick
- The Stellar Gauge : Essays on Science Fiction Writers edited by Michael J. Tolley and Kirpal Singh
- Where Pussywillows Last in the Catyard Bloomed and Other Poems by Roger Zelazny

=== 1982 ===
- Lavington Pugh by Jay Bland
- The Plains by Gerald Murnane

=== 1983 ===
- Dreamworks : Strange New Stories edited by David King
- An Unusual Angle by Greg Egan

=== 1984 ===
- In the Heart or in the Head : An Essay in Time Travel by George Turner

=== 1985 ===
- Landscape with Landscape by Gerald Murnane

=== 2022 ===
- Charm, Strangeness, Mass and Spin by Stephen Dedman
- The Millennium Job by Rob Gerrand

=== 2023 ===
- Aliens & Savages: The Voice in Australia by Janeen Webb and Andrew Enstice

=== 2024 ===
- The Book Blinders: Annals of Vandalism at the British Library by John Clute
- Proud and Lonely: A History of Science Fiction Fandom in Australia. Part One: 1930 - 1961 by Leigh Edmonds
