= Gillian Polack =

Australian writer and editor

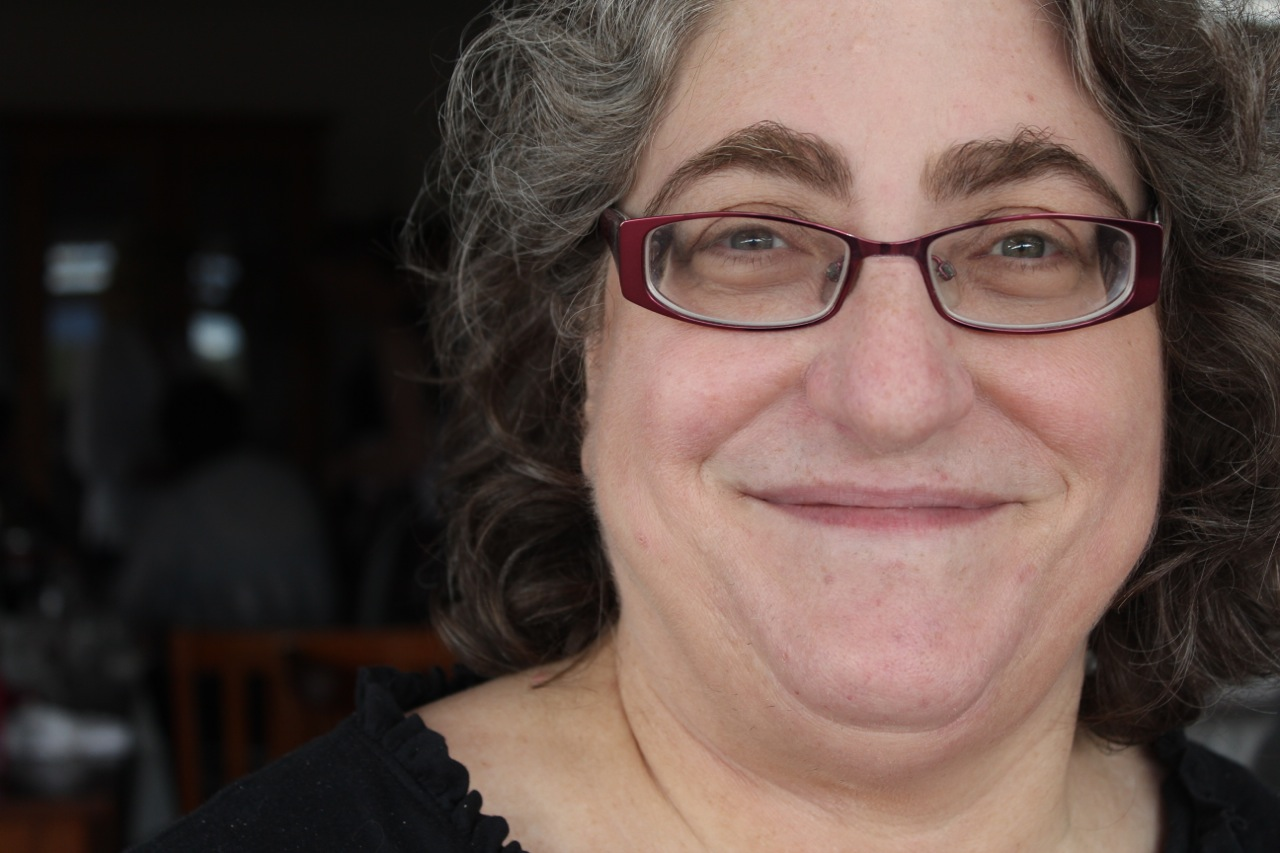
- Gillian Pollack in 2012
- Born: April 1961 (age 65); Melbourne, Australia
- Occupations: Writer; Editor
- Writing career
- Genre: Speculative fiction
- Website: www.gillianpolack.com

Gillian Polack (born April 1961) is an Australian writer and editor. She is a Medievalist and works with writers on history in fiction, also writing and editing mainly in the field of speculative fiction. She has published ten novels, numerous short stories and nonfiction articles, and is the creator of the New Ceres universe.

== Life ==
Gillian Polack was born in Melbourne. She went to local state schools. She attended Melbourne University and was awarded a Bachelor of Arts (First Class Honours) in History, with the Margaret Kiddle and Felix Raab Prizes. She did her Master of Arts at the Centre for Medieval Studies (University of Toronto) and submitted her thesis for Doctor of Philosophy in History at the University of Sydney. She later took out teaching qualifications at the University of New England and a Doctor of Philosophy in Creative Writing at the University of Western Australia. Gillian is currently affiliated with Deakin University. She currently lives in Canberra, ACT. She is Jewish.

Polack was the Australasian delegate for the 72nd World Science Fiction Convention and presented the Hugo award for Best Fanzine in 2014. In 2009, she was also the co-convener for Flycon, the first online international Science Fiction Convention. Polack was the convenor and judge of the Conflux short story competition in 2010 and spent seven years, from 2006 to 2013, as Conflux's acting project leader in charge of planning and organising its annual historical banquets, employing her knowledge as a food historian and teacher of food history at the Australian National University.

Polack has been the Guest for Honour for several science fiction conventions including Sydney Freecon in 2006, the Conflux Science Fiction Convention in 2008 and the Liburnicon science fiction convention in Opatija, Croatia in 2014.

== Writing ==
=== Novels ===
- The Green Children Help Out (Madness Heart Press, 2021)
- Borderlanders (Odyssey, 2020)
- Poison and Light (Shooting Star, 2020)
- The Year of the Fruitcake (IFWG Publishing, 2019)
- The Time of the Ghosts (Book View Cafe, 2017)
- The Wizardry of Jewish Women (Book View Cafe, 2017)
- The Art of Effective Dreaming (Satalyte, 2015)
- Langue[dot]doc 1305 (Satalyte, 2014)
- Ms Cellophane (Momentum, 2012)
  - Published originally as Life Through Cellophane (Eneit Press, 2009)
- Illuminations (Tritium Publishing, USA, 2003)

=== Collections ===
- Mountains of the Mind (Shooting Star Press, 2018)

=== Short stories ===
- "Allons" (2019) Lace and Blade 5, MZB Literary Works Trust
- "A Plague of Dancers" (2018) It Happened at the Ball, Book View Cafe
- "After Eden" (2017) Nevertheless, She Persisted Book View Café
- "Someone's Daughter", (2013), Next, CSFG Publishing
  - Finnish translation, Alienisti, (2015)
- "Passports", (2009), In Bad Dreams 2, Eneit Press
- "Horrible Historians", (2006), Subterranean Magazine, Fall, USA
  - Recommended Dozois Year's Best SF
- "Impractical Magic", (2005), Andromeda Spaceways Inflight Magazine #17,
  - Recommended reading, Datlow/Link/Grant Year's Best 2005
  - Swedish translation, Enhörningen, (2015)
- "Happy Faces for Happy Families", (2004), Encounters, CSFG Publishing
  - Recommended, Datlow's Year's Best Fantasy and Horror (2004)
- "Words", (1985), short story in EMU Literary Magazine for Young Australians Spring/Summer
- "The Performance", (1982), The Journal (Short Story Supplement)
  - Winner, Victorian Government Ministry for the Arts Award

=== Non-fiction ===
Polack's nonfiction work covers a broad spectrum. Her scholarly work focuses both on the Middle Ages and on modern writers, with, for instance, a feature article on the Middle Ages in Robin Reid's Women in Science Fiction and Fantasy. She reviews speculative fiction and has written guests posts on subjects ranging from writing to history.

- History and Fiction (Peter Lang 2016)
- The Middle Ages Unlocked, co-authored with K. Kania, (Amberley Press, 2015)
- Five Historical Feasts, (Conflux/Eneit Press, 2011)
- A Medieval French Rosh Hashanah, (Kosher Consumers' Association, 2003)
- Once and Future: Medieval and Modern Arthurian Literature, (The Arthurian Association of Australia, Occasional Papers Volume 1, 2000)
  - Polack acted as both editor and contributor

=== New Ceres ===
Polack created the New Ceres universe for a short story. Alisa Krasnostein, now of Twelfth Planet Press, used this universe as the basis for the New Ceres webzine and for stories set in the New Ceres universe.

== Editing ==
Polack is the co-editor of Masques, published by Canberra Speculative Fiction Guild, 2009 and of the Baggage anthology published by Eneit Press run by Sharyn Lilley, 2010. The table of contents includes K. J. Bishop, Jack Dann, Kaaron Warren and Jennifer Fallon.

== Teaching and education ==
Polack has taught at the Centre for Continuing Education, Australian National University and at the Canberra Writers' Centre. Her guest teaching has included History for fiction writers at the NSW Writers' Centre and floortalks at museums such as the Canberra Museum and Art Gallery. She has also been a panellist at the Canberra Literary Festival.

== Organisations ==
Gillian Polack has worked on many committees and been asked to give talks for many organisations, both in paid and voluntary capacities. She has been a member of the Australian NGO Working Group for the UN World Conference Against Racism, a past member of the Ministerial Advisory Council on Women, ACT, and was the vice-president and National Director of the National Council of Jewish Women of Australia (1994–1997).

== Awards ==
- 2010 Ditmar Awards - Shortlisted Best Novel Life Through Cellophane (Eneit Press)
- 2010 Ditmar Awards WINNER - (along with her team for the Southern Gothic banquet) for Best Achievement
- 2011 Ditmar Awards - Shortlisted Best Collection Baggage (Eneit Press, but current in print through Wildside/Borgo)
- 2017 Ditmar Awards - Shortlisted Best Novel The Wizardry of Jewish Women (Book View Cafe)
- 2017 William Atheling Jr Award Shortlisted for Criticism or Review History and Fiction: Writers, their Research, Worlds and Stories, Peter Lang.
- 2019 Aurealis Awards - Shortlisted Best Science Fiction Novel The Year of the Fruit Cake (IFWG Publishing Australia)
- 2019 Ditmar Awards - Shortlisted Best Collection Mountains of the Mind (Shooting Star Press)
- 2020 Ditmar Awards - Winner, best novel Ditmar 2020 Year of the Fruitcake (IFWG Publishing)
- 2020 Chandler Awards - Winner A. Bertram Chandler Award 2020
- 2021 Ditmar Awards - Shortlisted Best Novel Poison & Light (Shooting Star Press)
- 2022 Sidewise Award - Shortlisted Short Form "Why the Bridgemasters of York Don't Pay Taxes"
