= Australian National Science Fiction Convention =

The Australian National Science Fiction Convention or Natcon is an annual science fiction convention. Each convention is run by a different committee unaffiliated with any national fannish body. Bids for running the Natcon are voted on by attendees at the Natcon two years in advance. These votes are held at a Business Meeting organised by the convention committee, and held at the convention, in practice much of the organisation of the meeting is done by a standing committee selected by the prior meeting.

== Ditmar Award ==
The Ditmar Award has been awarded at the convention since 1969 to recognise achievement in Australian science fiction (including fantasy and horror) and science fiction fandom. The award is similar to the Hugo Award but on a national rather than international scale. At various times in its history the award has included international categories, but this is the exception. Categories include both professional and fan categories, focusing on fiction but also including some artistic and general achievement (as well as, since the demise of the ASFMAs, several "production" awards).

== List of Australian National Science Fiction Conventions ==
Num	Date	Name	Location	Guests of Honour	References
1	22 March 1952	First Australian Science Fiction Convention	Sydney	(none)	
2	1–3 May 1953	Second Australian Science Fiction Convention	Sydney	(none)	
3	17–18 April 1954	Third Australian Science Fiction Convention	Sydney	(none)	
4	18–20 March 1955	Fourth Australian Science Fiction Convention	Sydney	Arthur C. Clarke	
5	8–9 December 1956	Olympicon	Melbourne	Frank Bryning	
6	5–6 April 1958	Sixth Australian Science Fiction Convention	Melbourne	(none)	
7	Easter 1966	Seventh Australian Science Fiction Convention	Melbourne	(none)	
8	4–6 April 1969	Eighth Australian Science Fiction Convention	Melbourne	Lee Harding, John Foyster	
9	Easter 1970	Ninth Australian Science Fiction Convention	Melbourne	(none)	
10	1–2 January 1971	Tenth Australian Science Fiction Convention	Melbourne	Robin Johnson	
11	11–13 August 1972	Syncon '72	Sydney	Lesleigh Luttrell	
12	17–19 August 1973	Advention 2	Adelaide	John Foyster	
13	16–18 August 1974	Ozcon	Melbourne	Merv Binns and (fan) John Bangsund	
14	24–27 January 1975	Syncon '75	Sydney	(none)	
15	13–15 August 1976	Bofcon	Melbourne	(none)	
16	29–31 July 1977	A-Con 7	Adelaide	Bill Rotsler	
17	24–27 March 1978	Unicon IV	Melbourne	Brian Aldiss, Roger Zelazny	
18	10–13 August 1979	Syncon '79	Sydney	Gordon R. Dickson, Ken Fletcher, Linda Lounsbury, Kouichi Yamamoto	
19	15–18 August 1980	Swancon 5	Perth	Anne McCaffrey, Shayne McCormack, Grant Stone	
20	6–8 June 1981	Advention '81	Adelaide	Frank Herbert, John Ossian (John Foyster), K. U. F. Widdershins (John Foyster)	
21	9–12 April 1982	Tschaicon	Melbourne	Jack Vance, Leanne Frahm, Eric Lindsay	
22	10–13 June 1983	Syncon '83	Sydney	Harlan Ellison, Van Ikin	
23	20–23 April 1984	Eurekacon	Melbourne	George Turner	
24	5–8 April 1985	Advention '85	Adelaide	Lee Harding	
25	28–31 March 1986	Swancon XI	Perth	C. J. Cherryh, Jack Herman	
26	24–27 April 1987	Capcon	Canberra	Robert Asprin, Lynn Abbey, John Newman	
27	10–13 June 1988	Conviction	Sydney	Spider Robinson, Jeanne Robinson, Carey Handfield	
28	23–27 March 1989	Swancon 14	Perth	John Varley, Bob Shaw, Paul J. Stevens	
29	13–16 April 1990	Danse Macabre	Melbourne	George R. R. Martin, Eric Lindsay	
30	29 March – 1 April 1991	Suncon	Brisbane	Patrick Tilley, Harlan Ellison, Leigh Edmonds	
31	17–20 April 1992	Syncon '92	Sydney	Michael Whelan, Nick Stathopoulos, Sean McMullen	
32	8–12 April 1993	Swancon 18	Perth	Terry Pratchett, Robert Jordan and Craig Hilton	
33	1–4 April 1994	Constantinople	Melbourne	William Gibson, Bruce Gillespie, Bean & Medge.	
34	9–12 June 1995	Thylacon	Hobart	Kim Stanley Robinson, Peter Nicholls, Grant Stone	
35	4–8 April 1996	Festival of the Imagination	Perth	Storm Constantine, Neil Gaiman	
36	27–28 September 1997	Basicon 2	Melbourne	(none)	
37	5–8 June 1998	Thylacon 2	Hobart	George R. R. Martin, Leanne Frahm	
38	2–6 September 1999	SpawnCon Two (part of Aussiecon Three, the 57th Worldcon)	Melbourne	(none)	
39	20–24 April 2000	Swancon 2000	Perth	Connie Willis, Robin Hobb, Garth Nix, Ian Nichols, Mitch	
40	13–15 April 2001	Swancon 2001: Masquerade	Perth	Robert Silverberg, Karen Haber, Rosaleen Love, Marilyn Pride, Lewis Morley, Kate Orman, and Sue Ackermann	
41	7–10 June 2002	Convergence 2002	Melbourne	Joe & Gay Haldeman, Lucy Sussex, Sean Williams, and (fan) Race Mathews	
42	17–21 April 2003	Swancon 2003	Perth	Lynn Flewelling, Tony Shillitoe, Fiona McIntosh, and (fan) Justin Ackroyd	
43	23–26 April 2004	Conflux	Canberra	Greg Benford, Sean McMullen, and (fan) Karen Herkes	
44	10–13 June 2005	Thylacon 2005	Hobart	Anne Bishop, Marianne de Pierres, and (fan) Merv Binns	
45	14–17 April 2006	Conjure	Brisbane	Cory Doctorow, Bruce Sterling, Sean Williams, Jonathan Strahan, and (fan) Erika Maria Lacey	
46	8–11 June 2007	Convergence 2	Melbourne	Isobelle Carmody, Fred Gallagher, Dave Freer, and (fan) Cath Ortlieb	
47	20–24 March 2008	State of the Art: Swancon 2008	Perth	Ken Macleod, Rob Shearman, Glenda Larke, and (fan) Zara Baxter	
48	5–8 June 2009	Conjecture	Adelaide	Julie E. Czerneda, and (fans) Steve & Catherine Scholz	
49	2–6 September 2010	Dudcon III (held in conjunction with Aussiecon IV, the 68th Worldcon)	Melbourne	Peter Watts, Helen Merrick, and (fan) Jacob Blake	
50	21–25 April 2011	Swancon Thirty Six | Natcon Fifty	Perth	Ellen Datlow, Justina Robson, Sean Williams, and (fan) Sarah Xu	
51	8–11 June 2012	Continuum 8: Craftonomicon	Melbourne	Kelly Link, Alison Goodman, and (fan) Sue Ann Barber	
52	25–28 April 2013	Conflux 9	Canberra	Nalo Hopkinson, Marc Gascoigne, Karen Miller, and (fan) Rose Mitchell	
53	6–9 June 2014	Continuum X: Carnival of Lost Souls	Melbourne	Jim C. Hines, Ambelin Kwaymullina, and (fans) Danny Oz & Sharon Moseley	
54	2–6 April 2015	Swancon 40	Perth	John Scalzi, Kylie Chan, and (fan) Anthony Peacey	
55	25–28 March 2016	Contact2016	Brisbane	Ben Aaronovitch, Jill Pantozzi, Keri Arthur, and (fan) Kirilee Barker	
56	9–12 June 2017	Continuum 13: Triskaidekaphilia	Melbourne	Seanan McGuire/Mira Grant, Likhain aka M. Sereno	
57	29 March – 2 April 2018	Swancon 2018: Transmogrification	Perth	Ryan Griffen, Foz Meadows, Emily Smith, Wolfgang Bylsma, and (fan) Barb de la Hunty	
58	7-10 June 2019	Continuum 15: Other Worlds	Melbourne	Kate Elliott, Ken Liu	
59	7-10 June 2020	Swancon 2020	Perth	Nalini Singh, John Robertson	
60	~~7-10 June 2021~~; 30 September - 3 October 2022 (postponed due to COVID-19 lockdowns)	Conflux 16: Visions of Time	Canberra	John Birmingham, Amie Kaufman, Daniel O'Malley, Lisa Fuller, Tom Buckland	
61	29 September - 2 October 2023	Conflux 17: Passages and Portals	Canberra	Amie Kaufman, Grace Chan, Lisa Fuller, Ellen Datlow, Helen Marshall, Perry Middlemiss (fan guest)	
62	17-19 May 2024	Continuum 16: Reboot	Melbourne	Shannon Chakraborty, Vanessa Len, Cienan Muir	
63	~~16-18 May 2025~~ (cancelled due to venue problems)	Continuum 17: Horizons	Melbourne	Maria Lewis, Amie Kaufman, others to be announced	
