= World of Wonder (anthology) =

1951 anthology edited by Fletcher Pratt

- Dust-jacket from the first edition
- Author: Fletcher Pratt, ed.
- Cover artist: Herbstmann
- Language: English
- Genre: Science fiction, fantasy
- Published: 1951 (Twayne)
- Publication place: United States
- Media type: Print (Hardback)
- Pages: 445
- OCLC: 18329345

World of Wonder is an anthology of science fiction and fantasy stories edited by Fletcher Pratt, published in hardcover by Twayne in 1951. No subsequent editions were issued.

== Contents ==
- "Foreword", Edith R. Mirrielees
- "The Nature of Imaginative Literature", Fletcher Pratt (essay)
- "He Walked Around the Horses", H. Beam Piper (Astounding 1948)
- "Roads of Destiny", O. Henry (Roads of Destiny 1909)
- "The Red Queen’s Race", Isaac Asimov (Astounding 1949)
- "Child’s Play", William Tenn (Astounding 1947)
- "The Finest Story in the World", Rudyard Kipling (Contemporary Review 1891)
- "Etaoin Shrdlu", Fredric Brown (Unknown 1942)
- "Mistake Inside", James Blish (Startling Stories 1948)
- "Private—Keep Out!", Philip MacDonald (F&SF 1949)
- "They", Robert A. Heinlein (Unknown 1941)
- Metamorphosis, Franz Kafka (1937)
- "Back There in the Grass", Gouverneur Morris (Collier's Weekly 1911)
- "The Mark of the Beast", Rudyard Kipling (The Pioneer 1890)
- "Museum Piece", Esther Carlson (Moon Over the Back Fence 1947)
- "The Blue Giraffe", L. Sprague de Camp (Astounding 1939)
- "That Only a Mother", Judith Merril (Astounding 1948)
- "Operation RSVP", H. Beam Piper (Amazing 1951)
- "Conquerors’ Isle", Nelson S. Bond (Blue Book 1946)
- "Giant Killer", A. Bertram Chandler (Astounding 1945)
- "The Million-Year Picnic", Ray Bradbury (Planet Stories 1946 )

== Reception ==
New York Times reviewer Villiers Gerson, despite describing the contents as "excellent stories," faulted the anthology because the diversity of the stories "obscures the sharp line between fantasy and its more popular sibling, science fiction," and because many of the stories had previously been anthologized.
