= Russell B. Farr =

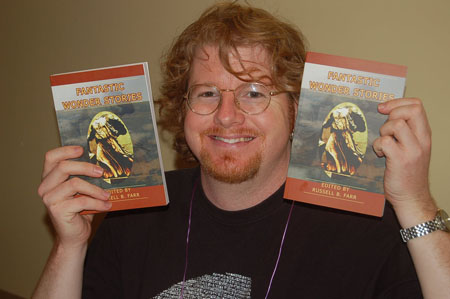
- Russell B. Farr at SwanCon 2007 holding two copies of the anthology Fantastic Wonder Stories.
- Born: Perth, Western Australia
- Writing career
- Period: 1996-present
- Genre: Speculative fiction
- Website: members.iinet.net.au/~rustle/index.html

Russell B. Farr is an Australian editor and writer of speculative fiction.

== Biography ==
Farr was born in Perth, Western Australia. In 1996 he founded Ticonderoga Publications publishing works by authors such as Sean Williams and Stephen Dedman. In 1999 Farr created the online journal Ticonderoga Online, which in 2006 won the Ditmar Award for best fanzine. In 2008 Farr won the Ditmar Award for best collected work as the editor of the anthology Fantastic Wonder Stories. He also won the 2008 Aurealis Award for best collection as the editor of Sean Williams' collection Magic Dirt: The Best of Sean Williams. Farr as a writer has published over 100 stories articles, reviews and essays. He now lives in Greenwood, Western Australia.

== Awards and nominations ==
Year	Award	Work	Category	Result
2004	Ditmar Award	No Award	Best fanzine	Nomination
2006	Ditmar Award	Ticonderoga Online	Best fanzine	Won
2007	Ditmar Award	—	Professional achievement	Nomination
2008	Aurealis Award	Magic Dirt: The Best of Sean Williams (with Sean Williams. Farr as editor)	Best collection	Won
2008	Ditmar Award	—	Professional achievement	Nomination
2008	Ditmar Award	Fantastic Wonder Stories (as editor)	Best collected work	Won
2008	Ditmar Award	The Workers' Paradise (with Nick Evans as editors)	Best collected work	Nomination
2013	Chandler Award			Won

== Bibliography ==
=== Anthologies ===
As editor

- Fantastic Wonder Stories (2007)
- The Workers' Paradise (2007, co-edited with Nick Evans)
- Belong (2010)
- Dead Red Heart (2011)

=== Collections ===
As editor

- Antique Futures: The Best of Terry Dowling (1999, co-editor)
- Magic Dirt: The Best of Sean Williams (2008)

=== Journals ===
As editor

- Ticonderoga Online (1999–present)

=== Essays ===
- Afterword - Imagining Troy (2006) in Troy (a collection by Simon Brown)
- Where There is the Fantastic, There is Wonder (2007) in Fantastic Wonder Stories
