= John Bangsund =

Australian science fiction fan (1939–2020)

John Bangsund (21 April 1939 – 22 August 2020) was an Australian science fiction fan in the 1960s, 1970s, and 1980s. He was a major force, with Andrew I. Porter, behind Australia winning the right to host the 1975 Aussiecon, and he was Toastmaster at the Hugo Award ceremony at that convention.

== Work ==
Bangsund was an influential and founding member of ANZAPA – the Australian and New Zealand Amateur Press Association; and long-time editor of the newsletter for the Victorian Society of Editors in Australia (of which he was an honorary life member). His fanzine, Australian Science Fiction Review (ASFR), did much to help revive science fiction fandom in Australia during the 1960s.

He was co-chair of the 9th Australian S.F. Convention (1970), and Fan Guest of Honor at Ozcon (1974 Australian National SF Convention).

Bangsund was the instigator of the term Muphry's law, which states that "if you write anything criticizing editing or proofreading, there will be a fault of some kind in what you have written".

== Personal life and death ==
Bangsund was married to Sally Yeoland, who announced on his Facebook page that on 22 August 2020, he had died from COVID-19 during the COVID-19 pandemic in Australia.

== Awards ==
- Hugo Award for Best Fanzine 1967, Australian SF Review, nominated
- Hugo Award for Best Fanzine 1968, Australian SF Review, nominated
- Ditmar Award Best Australian Amateur Science Fiction Publication or Fanzine 1969, Australian SF Review, winner
- Ditmar Award Best Australian Fanzine 1972, Scythrop, nominated
- Hugo Award for Best Fan Writer 1975, nominated
- Ditmar Award Best Australian Fan Writer 1979, nominated
- Ditmar Award William Atheling Jr Award 1979, Parergon Papers 10, ANZAPA, Oct 1978, nominated
- Chandler Award, 2001
- FAAN Lifetime Achievement Award, 2016

== Book references ==
- Approaches to the Fiction of Ursula K. Le Guin by James Warren Bittner Approaches to the Fiction of Ursula K. Le Guin
- The History of the Science-fiction Magazine by Michael Ashley Transformations: The Story of the Science-fiction Magazines from 1950 to 1970
- The Language of the Night by Ursula K. Le Guin, Susan Wood The Language of the Night: Essays on Fantasy and Science Fiction
- Overland by O.L. Society Overland
- Science Fiction and Fantasy Reference Index, 1992-1995 by Halbert W. Hall Science Fiction and Fantasy Reference Index, 1992-1995: An International Subject and Author Index to History and Criticism

== Bibliography ==
=== Edited ===
- John W. Campbell: An Australian tribute (1972)

=== Major fanzines ===
- Australian SF Review (1966–69) - twice nominated for a Hugo Award
- Scythrop (1969–1972)
- Philosophical Gas
- Parergon Papers

=== Essays ===
- John Bangsund, "1968 and All That"
