= Self-referential humor =

Humor that alludes to itself

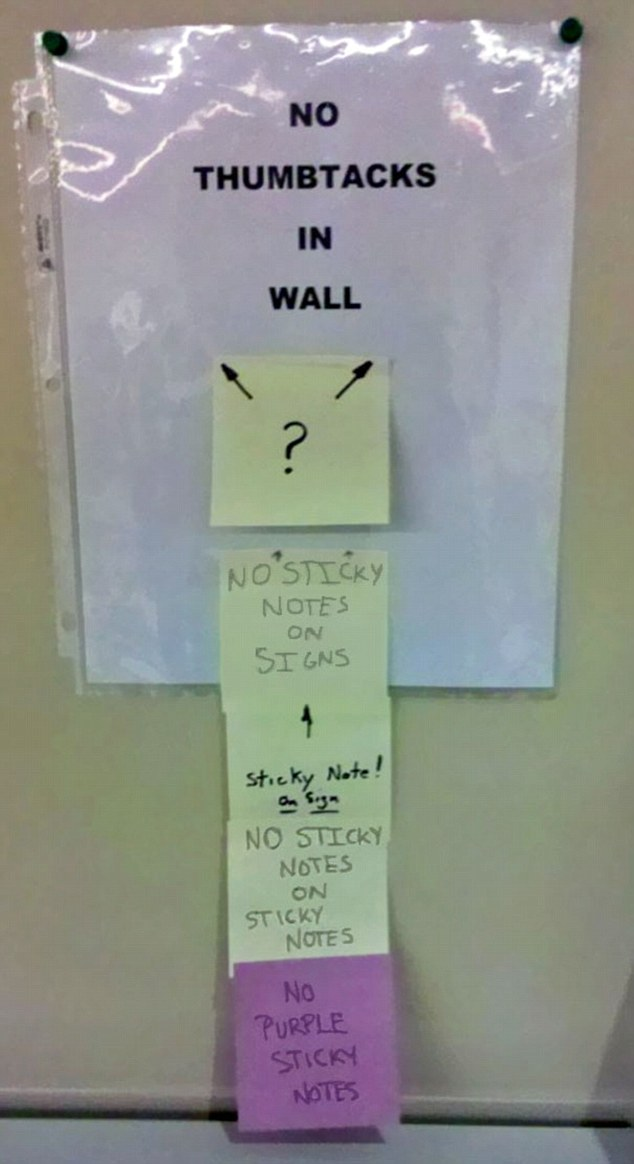
- An example of self-referential humor on a shared noticeboard
- Alternative name: Meta humor

Self-referential humor, also known as self-reflexive humor, self-aware humor, or meta humor, is a type of comedic expression that—either directed toward some other subject, or openly directed toward itself—is self-referential in some way, intentionally alluding to the very person who is expressing the humor in a comedic fashion, or to some specific aspect of that same comedic expression. Here, meta is used to describe that the joke explicitly talks about other jokes, a usage similar to the words metadata (data about data), metatheatrics (a play within a play as in Hamlet) and metafiction. Self-referential humor expressed discreetly and surrealistically is a form of bathos. In general, self-referential humor often uses hypocrisy, oxymoron, or paradox to create a contradictory or otherwise absurd situation that is humorous to the audience.

== History ==
Old Comedy of Classical Athens is held to be the first—in the extant sources—form of self-referential comedy. Aristophanes, whose plays form the only remaining fragments of Old Comedy, used fantastical plots, grotesque and inhuman masks and status reversals of characters to slander prominent politicians and court his audience's approval.

Douglas Hofstadter wrote several books on the subject of self-reference; the term meta has come to be used, particularly in art, to refer to something that is self-referential.

== Meta-jokes ==
Meta-jokes are a popular form of humor. They contain several somewhat different, but related categories: joke templates, class-referential jokes, self-referential jokes and jokes about jokes.

=== Joke template ===
This form of meta-joke is a sarcastic jab at the endless refitting of joke forms (often by professional comedians) to different circumstances or characters without a significant innovation in the humor.

Three people of different nationalities walk into a bar. Two of them say something smart, and the third one makes a mockery of his fellow countrymen by acting stupid.

Three blokes walk into a pub. One of them is a little bit stupid, and the whole scene unfolds with a tedious inevitability. —Bill Bailey

How many members of a certain demographic group does it take to perform a specified task?
A finite number: one to perform the task and the remainder to act in a manner stereotypical of the group in question.

=== Class-referential jokes ===
This form of meta-joke contains a familiar class of jokes as part of the joke. For example, here are a few subversions of the standard bar joke format:

A dyslexic man walks into a bra.

A bar was walked into by the passive voice.

A non sequitur walks into a bar. In a strong wind, even turkeys can fly.

Three logicians walk into a bar. The bartender asks: "Do you all want a drink?" The first logician says "I don't know". The second logician says "I don't know". The third logician says "Yes!"

=== Self-referential jokes ===
Self-referential jokes refer to themselves rather than to larger classes of previous jokes.

What do you get when you cross a joke with a rhetorical question?

Three blind mice walk into a bar, but they are unaware of their surroundings so to derive humour from it would be exploitative.

— Bill Bailey

I'm a self-deprecating comedian...though I'm not very good at it.

— Stewart Francis

=== Jokes about jokes ===
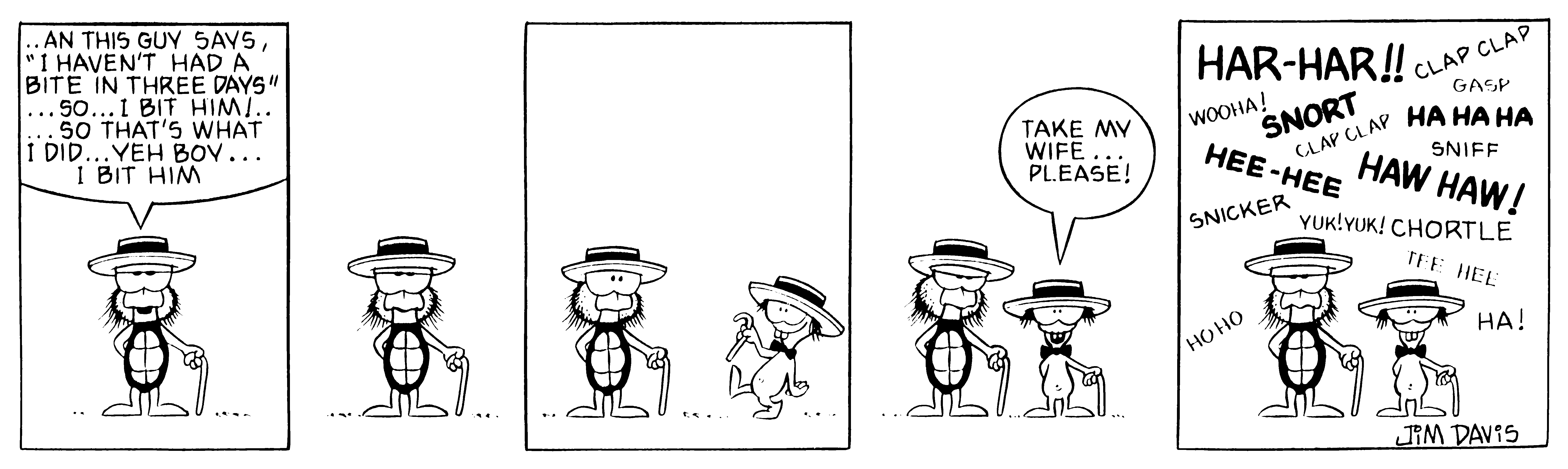
A Gnorm Gnat comic strip satirizing marital comedy.

Marc Galanter, in the introduction to his book Lowering the Bar: Lawyer Jokes and Legal Culture, cites a meta-joke in a speech of Chief Justice William Rehnquist:

I've often started off with a lawyer joke, a complete caricature of a lawyer who's been nasty, greedy, and unethical. But I've stopped that practice. I gradually realized that the lawyers in the audience didn't think the jokes were funny and the non-lawyers didn't know they were jokes.

Stand-up comedian Mitch Hedberg would often follow up a joke with an admission that it was poorly told, or insist to the audience that "that joke was funnier than you acted."

The process of being a humorist is also the subject of meta-jokes; for example, on an episode of QI, Jimmy Carr made the comment, "When I told them I wanted to be a comedian, they laughed. Well, they're not laughing now!"— a joke previously associated with Bob Monkhouse.

== Other examples ==
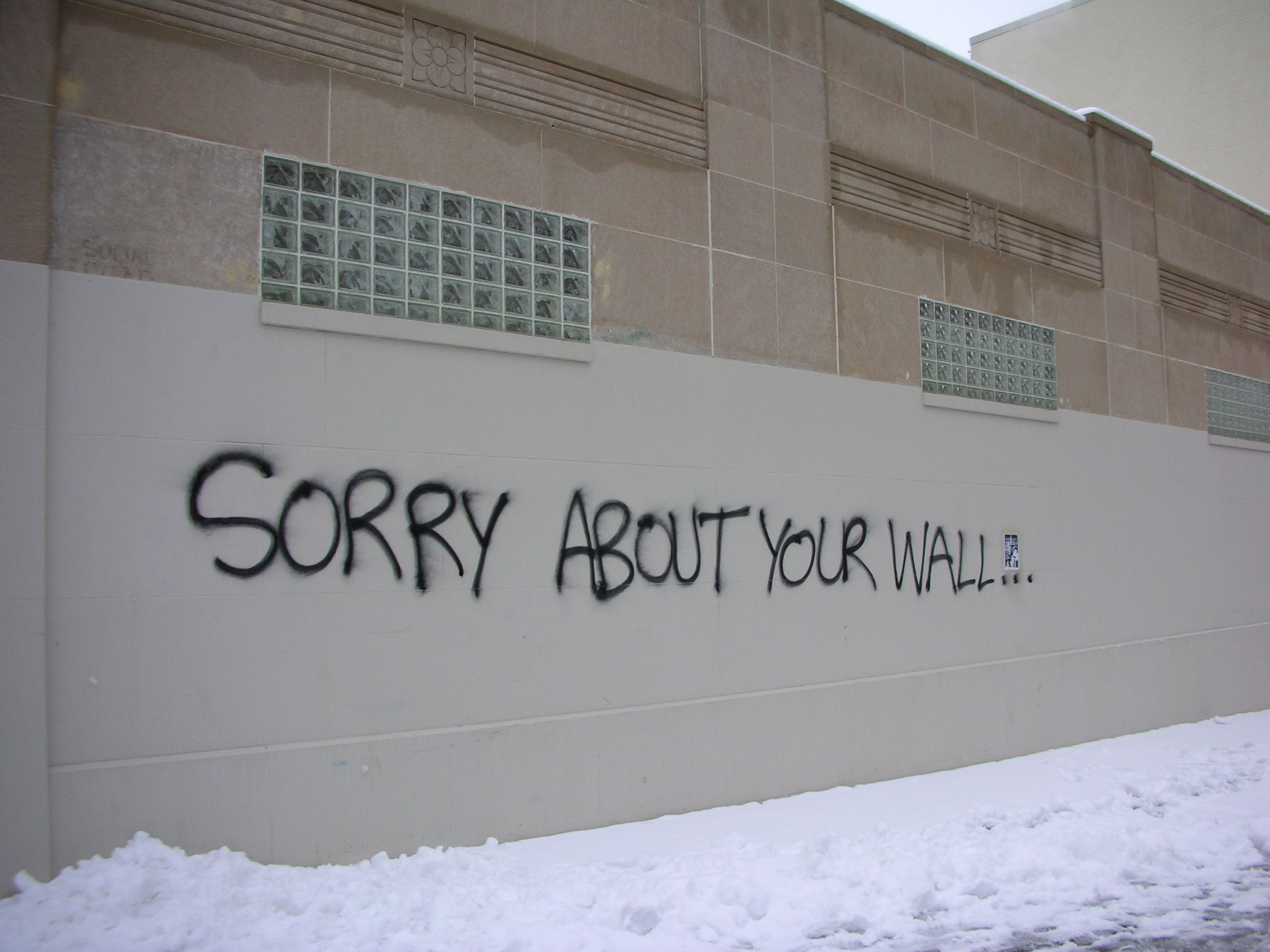
A self-referencing work of graffiti apologizing for its own existence

=== Fumblerules ===
Fumblerules are stylistic guidelines, presented such that the phrasing of the rule itself constitutes an infraction. For example, "Don't use no double negatives".

=== Limericks ===
A limerick referring to the anti-humor of limericks:

The limerick packs laughs anatomical
Into space that is quite economical.
But the good ones I've seen
So seldom are clean
And the clean ones so seldom are comical.

W. S. Gilbert wrote one of the definitive "anti-limericks":

There was an old man of St. Bees,
Who was stung in the arm by a wasp;
When they asked, "Does it hurt?"
He replied, "No, it doesn't,
But I thought all the while 'twas a Hornet."

Tom Stoppard's anti-limerick from Travesties:

A performative poet of Hibernia
Rhymed himself into a hernia
He became quite adept
At this practice, except
For the occasional non-sequitur.

A limerick about limericks:

A limerick's cleverly versed,
The second line rhymes with the first;
The third one is short,
The fourth's the same sort
And the last line is often the worst.

=== Metaparody ===
Metaparody is a form of humor or literary technique consisting "parodying the parody of the original", sometimes to the degree that the viewer is unclear as to which subtext is genuine and which subtext parodic. An example of a metaparody would be the film Scary Movie, which parodies the film Scream; itself a parody.

=== RAS Syndrome ===
RAS syndrome is the redundant use of one or more of the words that make up an acronym or initialism with the abbreviation itself, thus in effect repeating one or more words. "RAS" stands for Redundant Acronym Syndrome and so RAS syndrome is self-referencing.

== See also ==
- Breaking the fourth wall
- Dadaism
- Fumblerules, grammatical and stylistic principles stated in a way that breaks the rule
- Indirect self-reference
- In-joke
- Intertextuality
- Irony
- Meta (prefix) – Prefix in English derived from Greek
- Meta-reference – Type of self reference
- Recursion – Process of repeating items in a self-similar way
- Self-reference – Sentence, idea or formula that refers to itself
- Snowclone – Cliché used as a pattern for other expressions
- Surreal humour – Form of humour predicated on deliberate violations of causal reasoning
- Autological word – Word that expresses a property it also possesses
