= An Unusual Angle =

1983 novel by Greg Egan

- First edition
- Author: Greg Egan
- Language: English
- Genre: Science fiction novel
- Publisher: Norstrilia Press
- Publication date: 1983
- Publication place: Australia
- Media type: Print (Hardback & Paperback)
- Pages: 200
- ISBN: 0-909106-11-8
- OCLC: 12214214
- Dewey Decimal: 823 19
- LC Class: PR9619.3.E35 U5 1983

An Unusual Angle (1983) was the debut novel by Australian science fiction writer Greg Egan by Norstrilia Press.

== Synopsis ==
The novel follows a high school boy who makes movies inside his head using a bio-mechanical camera, one that he has grown. He is also able to send out other "viewpoints", controlled with his "psi" powers, of which he has more power than anyone else he's ever met. Most of the book concerns the boy trying to get his films out of his head, but no brain surgeon will believe him.

== Background ==
In an interview with Eidolon in 1993, Egan said that he "became obsessed with [amateur film-making] in [his] last year of high school" and decided to make a half-hour absurdist play based on "Out of the Flying Pan" by David Campton. He paid "a thousand dollars for the film rights", which were "saved up by working on a milk truck for a couple of years", and even though he "had no prospect of ever earning a cent", he "went ahead and did it anyway". With himself as the entire crew and the help of friends and family, he furthermore made an hour-long film adapted from an own screenplay, which he described as "a pretty heavy-handed satire about a referendum being held to decide whether or not the human race should deliberately annihilate itself". He stopped studying after finishing his Bachelor of Science and worked on the movie for a year, using it to "apply to the Australian Film, Television and Radio School in Sydney", but eventually realized after four weeks how much he'd hate working in the film industry. Egan then claimed that "film-making has pretty much vanished from [his] thoughts". Apart from the short story "Tangled Up" about "a film-maker lost in an infinite regress of films-within-films", film-making "hasn't been a theme in any of [his] later work".

In December 2009, Egan published a review of James Cameron's Avatar, writing his "aim was to find out what counts as a quintessential science-fiction blockbuster at the end of the first decade of the twenty-first century". In June 2015, Egan published an essay titled "No Intelligence Required", wondering why "almost every contemporary science fiction movie irredeemably stupid" and analysed Spike Jonze's Her, Alex Garland's Ex Machina and Christopher Nolan's Interstellar.

== Critical reception ==
Writing in The MT Void Evelyn C. Leeper commented: "The plot of this book is not like Egan's later work, but the wealth of ideas—and many of the same ideas—that characterize his later work is. There is a section on how quantum mechanics restored the concept of free will. The protagonist sends out "viewpoints"–essentially non-material copies of himself–to perform various tasks. The protagonist is (literally) making films in his head, which conjures up a vision of universes within an individual mind, which in turn conjures up the image of layers of universes. (And yes, I mean literally–the protagonist claims to have an actual little film lab in there!)"
