= Fallen Spaceman =

1971 short story by Lee Harding

- Short story by Lee Harding
- Country: Australia
- Language: English
- Genre: Science Fiction

Publication
- Published in: If : Worlds of Science Fiction
- Publication type: Periodical
- Media type: Print
- Publication date: June 1971

"Fallen Spaceman" is a science fiction short story by Australian writer Lee Harding. It was first published in the June 1971 issue of If : Worlds of Science Fiction.

== Plot summary ==
Mattaro, the spaceman of the title, finds himself alone and abandoned in orbit around a planet after his ship, the Star Wind, unexpectedly accelerates away from him while he is undertaking a routine, exterior inspection of the ship's drive systems. With only a few hours of oxygen left in his spacesuit he must find a way to get to the planet below and somehow survive.

== Critical reception ==
Writing in SF Commentary Bruce Gillespie called this story "a good yarn and very well told." He went on: "A few Hardingisms remain (Harding characters tend to 'shiver' in times of danger and lapse into panicked italics) but not many."

== Publication history ==
After the story's initial publication in If magazine in June 1971, it was revised and expanded to novella length under the title The Fallen Spaceman. This version was later published as follows:

- 1973, Cassell, Australia
- 1975, Cassell, Australia
- 1980, Harper & Row, USA
- 1982, Bantam Skylark, USA

== Award ==
- Australian SF Achievement Award, Best Australian Science Fiction, winner, 1972

== Note ==
You can read the full text of the story on the Internet Archive.

== See also ==
- 1971 in Australian literature
