= Muphry's law =

Adage about hypocritical proscription

Muphry's law is an adage that states: "If you write anything criticizing editing or proofreading, there will be a fault of some kind in what you have written." The name is a deliberate misspelling of "Murphy's law".

== History ==
John Bangsund of the Society of Editors (Victoria) in Australia identified Muphry's law as "the editorial application of the better-known Murphy's law", and set it down in March 1992 in the Society of Editors Newsletter in his column "John Bangsund's Threepenny Planet".

The law, as set out by Bangsund, states that:

(a) if you write anything criticizing editing or proofreading, there will be a fault of some kind in what you have written;
(b) if an author thanks you in a book for your editing or proofreading, there will be mistakes in the book;
(c) the stronger the sentiment expressed in (a) and (b), the greater the fault;
(d) any book devoted to editing or style will be internally inconsistent.

In November 2003, the Canberra Editor added the following elaboration:

Muphry's Law also dictates that, if a mistake is as plain as the nose on your face, everyone can see it but you. Your readers will always notice errors in a title, in headings, in the first paragraph of anything, and in the top lines of a new page. These are the very places where authors, editors and proofreaders are most likely to make mistakes.

Bangsund's formulation was not the first to express the general sentiment that editorial criticism or advice usually contains writing errors of its own. In 1989, Paul Dickson credited editor Joseph A. Umhoefer with the adage, "Articles on writing are themselves badly written", and quoted a correspondent who observed that Umhoefer "was probably the first to phrase it so publicly; however, many others must have thought of it long ago." An even earlier reference to the idea, though not phrased as an adage, appears in a 1909 book on writing by Ambrose Bierce:

In neither taste nor precision is any man's practice a court of last appeal, for writers all, both great and small, are habitual sinners against the light; and their accuser is cheerfully aware that his own work will supply (as in making this book it has supplied) many 'awful examples'—his later work less abundantly, he hopes, than his earlier. He nevertheless believes that this does not disqualify him for showing by other instances than his own how not to write. The infallible teacher is still in the forest primeval, throwing seeds to the white blackbirds.

— Write It Right: A Little Blacklist of Literary Faults (1909)

== Examples ==
Stephen J. Dubner described learning of the existence of Muphry's law in the "Freakonomics" section of The New York Times in July 2008. He had accused The Economist of a typo in referring to Cornish pasties being on sale in Mexico, assuming that pastries had been intended and being familiar only with the word pasties with the meaning of nipple coverings. A reader had alerted him to the existence of the law, and The Economist had responded by sending Dubner a Cornish pasty.

In 2009, then-British Prime Minister Gordon Brown hand-wrote a letter of condolence to a mother whose son had died in Afghanistan, in which he misspelled the man's surname. The Sun (a tabloid newspaper) published an article criticising his lack of care. However, in the article, the paper also misspelled the same name and was forced to publish an apology of its own.

== Variations ==
Names for variations on the principle have also been coined, usually in the context of online communication, including:

- Umhoefer's or Umhöfer's rule: "Articles on writing are themselves badly written." Named after editor Joseph A. Umhoefer.
- Skitt's law: "Any post correcting an error in another post will contain at least one error itself." Named after Skitt, a contributor to alt.usage.english on Usenet.
- Hartman's law of prescriptivist retaliation: "Any article or statement about correct grammar, punctuation, or spelling is bound to contain at least one eror [sic]." Named after editor and writer Jed Hartman.
- The iron law of nitpicking: "You are never more likely to make a grammatical error than when correcting someone else's grammar." Coined by blogger Zeno.
- McKean's law: "Any correction of the speech or writing of others will contain at least one grammatical, spelling, or typographical error." Named after editor Erin McKean.
- Bell's first law of Usenet: "Flames of spelling and/or grammar will have spelling and/or grammatical errors." Named after Andrew Bell, a contributor to alt.sex on Usenet.

Further variations state that flaws in a printed ("Clark's document law") or published work ("Barker's proof") will only be discovered after it is printed and not during proofreading, and flaws such as spelling errors in a sent email will be discovered by the sender only during rereading from the "Sent" box.

== See also ==
- Fumblerules – Rule of language or linguistic style that breaks the rule
- "Hoist with his own petard" – Quote from Hamlet indicating an ironic reversal
