= Dancing Gerontius =

1969 short story by Lee Harding

- Short story by Lee Harding
- Country: Australia
- Language: English
- Genre(s): Science Fiction

Publication
- Published in: Vision of Tomorrow
- Publication type: Periodical
- Media type: Print
- Publication date: December 1969

Dancing Gerontius is a science fiction short story by Australian writer Lee Harding. It was first published in the December 1969 issue of Vision of Tomorrow, and later included in several Australia sf anthologies.

== Plot summary ==
In a future where medical advances have allowed people to live longer and longer, the problem of what to do with the ever increasing number of older people is "solved" in a rather callous manner, yet one that many of them would accept.

== Further publications ==
After the story's initial publication in Vision of Tomorrow in December 1969 it was reprinted as follows:

- The Second Pacific Book of Science Fiction edited by John Baxter (1971)
- Australian Science Fiction 2 edited by John Baxter (1975)
- The Best Australian Science Fiction Writing : A Fifty Year Collection edited by Rob Gerrand (2004)

== Critical reception ==
In his review of The Second Pacific Book of Science Fiction critic George Turner called the story a "dark vision" and noted that the climatic scene is "a minor tour de force of evocative writing".

== Award ==
- Australian SF Achievement Award, Best Australian Science Fiction, winner, 1970

== See also ==
- 1969 in Australian literature
