= Grant Stone =

Australian librarian

Grant Stone is an Australian librarian. He was one of the original creators of Swancon. He was a radio presenter on the radio station RTRFM of the Faster Than Light Radio Show, as well as being the main force in the Murdoch University library special collections of popular culture material.

In 1996 he was the recipient of the Chandler Award for Australian science fiction. He has been involved with laughter yoga for some years.
