= Giant Killer (story) =

Short story by A. Bertram Chandler

- Short story by A. Bertram Chandler
- Cover Astounding Science Fiction October 1945
- Country: Australia
- Language: English
- Genre: Science fiction

Publication
- Published in: Astounding Science Fiction
- Publication type: Periodical
- Publisher: Street & Smith
- Media type: Print
- Publication date: October 1945

"Giant Killer" is a science fiction short story by A. Bertram Chandler. It was first published in the October 1945 issue of Astounding Science Fiction, and later included in many science fiction anthologies, including World of Wonder edited by Fletcher Pratt. In 1996 it was shortlisted for a Retro Hugo Award for Best Novella.

== Plot summary ==
Called a "pocket universe" story by The Encyclopedia of Science Fiction, "Giant Killer" is told from the point-of-view of a colony of mutants living in a spaceship. Though they are eventually (in the final sentence) revealed to be rats, they are obviously sentient lifeforms: they have a culture, complete with marriage, seers, governmental structures, specialized safety equipment, and ritualized combat. They are illiterate, albeit: they marvel as the giants make black marks on "skin," which they perceive as some inscrutable form of "sorcery." The "giants" of the story's title are the humans crewing the spaceship. Much is made of the mutants' efforts to understand the giants' fascinating world, including such locales as the Place-of-Life-Which-Is-Not-Life, obviously the robotics laboratory.

== Further publications ==
- World of Wonder edited by Fletcher Pratt (1951)
- Great Novels of SF edited by Robert Silverberg (1970)
- Novella : 3 edited by Ben Bova (1978)
- The Arbor House Treasury of Great Science Fiction Short Novels edited by Robert Silverberg and Martin H. Greenberg (1980)
- Isaac Asimov Presents The Great SF Stories 7 (1945) edited by Isaac Asimov (1982)
- Isaac Asimov Presents the Golden Years of Science Fiction : Fourth Series edited by Isaac Asimov and Martin H. Greenberg (1986)
- The Mammoth Book of Golden Age Science Fiction : Short Novels of the 1940s edited by Isaac Asimov and Martin H. Greenberg (1989)
- From Sea to Shining Star by Bertram Chandler (1990)

== Possible links with John Grimes series ==
In the 1967 novel "Contraband from Otherspace", Chandler's character John Grimes travels to an alternate history timeline where mutant rats have taken over the Rim Worlds and cruelly enslaved their human population. In that context, the mutant rats are obviously the book's villains who must be fought. Finding that the mutant rats developed on a spaceship which crashed on one of the Rim words, and that the mutants survived the crash to multiply, conquer and enslave the humans, Grimes manages to take his ship back in time and blow up the rat-infested ship, thus aborting the entire timeline of mutant rat conquest. Grimes is uneasily aware that his act might be considered as genocide, but sees no other way to avert the enslavement of the humans.

== See also ==
- Australian science fiction
- 1945 in Australian literature
