= Dead Red Heart =

Anthology of Australian vampire short stories

- Dead Red Heart book cover
- Editor: Russell B. Farr
- Language: English
- Genre: Short stories, Horror
- Publisher: Ticonderoga Publications
- Publication date: 1 May 2011
- Publication place: Australia
- Media type: Print (hardcover & paperback), e-book
- Pages: 504 pp.
- ISBN: 0980781310
- Website: https://ticonderogapublications.com

Dead Red Heart is an anthology of Australian vampire short stories edited by Russell B. Farr, published by Ticonderoga Publications in 2011.

== Contents ==
- “The Tide”, Martin Livings and friends
- “Mutiny on the Scarborough”, Shona Husk
- “Sun Falls”, Angela Slatter
- “Such is Life”, Jeremy Sadler
- “Apologetoi”, Chris Lawson
- “Punishment of the Sun”, Alan Baxter
- “Red Delicious”, Felicity Dowker
- “Just a Matter of Economics”, Yvonne Eve Walus
- “Quarantine”, Patty Jansen
- “Out of the Grave”, Amanda Pillar
- “Desert Blood”, Marty Young
- “Thin Air”, Simon Brown
- “Kissed by the Sun”, Jodi Cleghorn
- "Bats", Jane Routley
- “Black Heart”, Joanna Fay
- “Renfield's Wife”, Damon Cavalchini
- “Listening to Tracy”, Jen White
- “Breaking the Drought”, Jay Caselberg
- “Children of the Cane”, Jason Nahrung
- “The Sea at Night”, Joanne Anderton
- “Sky in the Morning”, Sonia Marcon
- “Taking it for the Team”, Tracie McBride
- “All that Glisters”, Pete Kempshall
- “The Rider”, Martin Livings
- “Vitality”, George Ivanoff
- “Coming Home”, Kathryn Hore
- “The Little Red Man”, Ray Gates
- “Deathborn Light”, Helen Stubbs
- “The Life Stealer”, Donna Maree Hanson
- “Behind the Black Mask”, Jacob Edwards
- “Interview with the Jiangshi”, Anne Mok
- “White and Red in the Black”, Lisa L Hannett
- “Lady Yang's Lament”, Penelope Love

== Critical reception ==
Publishers Weekly noted: "there are still many solid tales to satisfy vampire fans".

Writing on SFSite, Mario Guslandi noted: "The hefty volume... assembles thirty-three stories where diversity is the main feature. Some tales have a distinct Aussie taste in terms of location and local sub-culture, which contributes to shed a new light on vampires, their habits and their personalities."

Nalini Haynes writing for Dark Matter Zine noted: "an interesting, mostly engaging, assortment of short stories seeking to portray varying interpretations of vampire mythology. The sense of place, this is Australia, is the one consistent flavour of this anthology."

== Awards ==
The anthology won the Australasian Shadows Award for Edited Publication in 2011.
