= ASFMA Award =

Award for achievements within Australian science fiction

The Australian Science Fiction Media Awards (ASFMA Awards) were annual awards for achievement in non-literary media and media appreciation within Australian science fiction. They were awarded at the Australian National Science Fiction Convention from 1984 to 1997. The awards were formally dissolved and incorporated into the Ditmar Awards at the Business Meeting of the Australian National Science Fiction Convention (Spawncon II), held in Melbourne in 1999, with the formal merger of the Australian ‘Media NatCon’ and the NatCon.

== Results ==
=== 1983: Conquest '83, 24–25 September 1983 Brisbane ===
It was decided to give ASFMA awards at the annual Media Natcon, starting in 1984.

=== 1984: Medtrek 2, March 10–11, 1984, The Shore Inn Sydney ===
==== Best Australian Media Fanzine ====
- Chronicles

==== Best Australian Media Fanwriter ====
- Sue Bursztynski

==== Best Australian Media Fanartist ====
- Sue Campbell

=== 1985: Con Amore, June 8–10, 1985, Brisbane Parkroyal Brisbane ===
==== Best Australian Media Fanzine ====
- Chronicles

==== Best Australian Media Fanwriter ====
- Sue Bursztynski

==== Best Australian Media Fanartist ====
- Lynn Hendricks

=== 1986 Galactic Tours Convention, March 7–10, 1986, Townhouse Melbourne ===
==== Best Australian Media Fanzine ====
- Chronicles

==== Best Australian Media Fanwriter ====
- Sue Bursztynski

==== Best Australian Media Fanartist ====
- Robert Jan

==== Best Amateur Audio-Visual ====
- Sale of 23rd Century

=== 1987: Eccentricon, July 3–6, 1987, Hawkesbury Agricultural College N.S.W.(NSW) ===
==== Best Australian Media Fanzine ====
- Chronicles

==== Best Australian Media Fanwriter ====
- Sue Clarke

==== Best Australian Media Fanartist ====
- Robert Jan

==== Best Amateur Audio-Visual ====
- Perfect Botch

=== 1988: Zencon II, October 14–16, 1988, Carlton Social Club Melbourne ===
==== Best Australian Media Fanzine ====
- A for Andromeda
- Australian Playbeing
- Chronicles
- Newspeak
- Spock
- Timeloop

==== Best Australian Media Fanwriter ====
- Edwina Harvey
- Gail Neville
- Mark Try
- Karen Herkes
- Alan Stewart

==== Best Australian Media Fanartist ====
- Gail Adams
- David Kenyon
- Phil Wlodarczyk
- Ian Gunn
- Mark Try

=== 1989 Conspire, March 17–19, 1989, The Rex Hotel Canberra ===
==== Best Writer ====
- Nikki White

==== Best Artist ====
- Gail Adams

==== Best Fanzine ====
- Spock

==== Best Audio-visual ====
- No Award

=== 1990: Huttcon '90, November 23–25, 1990, The Diplomat Motel Melbourne ===
==== Best Australian Media Fanzine ====
- Starwalking Newsletter
- Enarrare, edited by Ellen Parry, Annie Hamilton, Marie Letters & Christine Poulson
- Spock
- Psychodaleks
- Captain's Log

==== Best Australian Media Fanwriter ====
- Ana Dorfstad
- Edwina Harvey
- Moira Dahlberg
- Jan McNally
- Sue Isle

==== Best Australian Media Fanartist ====
- Marianne Plumridge
- Wendy Purcell
- Bruce Mitchell
- Ian Gunn
- Phil Wlodarczyk

=== 1991 Vampiricon, October 11–13, 1991, Melbourne Townhouse ===
==== Best Writer ====
- Alan Stewart

==== Best Artist ====
- Ian Gunn

==== Best Fanzine ====
- Spock Wendy Purcell

==== Best Media Newszine ====
- Ethel the Aardvark edited by Alan Stewart

==== Best Audio-visual ====
- Danny Heap Huttcon `90 Opening Ceremony

=== 1992 HongCon, June 6–8, 1992, Hotel Adelaide, S.A. ===
==== Best Fiction Zine ====
- Steve & Martin's Excellent Fanzine Steven Scholz & Martin Reilly

==== Best Australian Media Newszine ====
3 way tie for award

- Just Alice Adam Jenkins
- Captain's Log Gail Adams
- Ethel the Aardvark Alan Stewart

==== Best Australian Media Fanwriter ====
- Martin Reilly

Best Australian Media Fanartist

- Steven Scholz

==== Best Amateur Audio-Visual ====
- James Bond etc George Ivanoff

=== 1993 DefCon, June 4–7, 1993, Hotel St George Wellington New Zealand ===
==== Best Australian Media Newszine ====
- Ethel the Aardvark edited by Alan Stewart & Paul Ewins

==== Best Australian Media fanwriter ====
- Hazel Naird

(Remaining categories not voted on due to inadequate nominations.)

=== 1994 Constantinople, April 1–4, Southern Cross Melbourne ===
==== Best Fan Writer ====
- James (Jocko) Allen
- Paul Ewins
- Terry Frost
- Jan MacNally
- Martin Reilly
- Katharine Shade

==== Best Fan Artist ====
- Ian Gunn
- Darren Reid
- Steve Scholtz
- Kerri Valkova
- Phil Wlodarczyk

==== Best Newsletter ====
- Awaken
- Blacklight
- Ethel the Aardvark
- Get Stuffed
- Thyme

==== Best Fan Fiction Zine ====
- Black Light
- Nekros
- Spock
- Steve and Martin's Excellent Fanzine
- Yukkies

==== Best Amateur Audiovisual Production ====
- Concave Opening Ceremony Russell Devlin
- Beky's Brain Phone Answering Message Danny Heap
- Star Wars Tribute @ Jedi 10th Darren Maxwell
- Starwalking Video, Karen Ogden
- Starwalking II Closing Ceremony The Bastards (Danny Heap & Paul Ewins)

=== 1995 Basicon, October 21, Melbourne University ===
==== Best Fan Writer ====
- Chris Ballis
- Paul Ewins
- Ian Gunn
- Karen Pender-Gunn

==== Best Fan Artist ====
- Ian Gunn
- Tracy Hamilton
- Darren Reid
- Catherine Scholz
- Steve Scholz
- Kerri Valkova

==== Best News Zine ====
- Coztume, Edited by Gail Adams
- Ethel The Aardvark, Edited by Paul Ewins
- Pink, Edited by Karen Pender-Gunn
- Severed Head, Edited by B.J.Stevens
- The Communicator, Edited by Derek Screen
- Thyme, Edited by Alan Stewart

==== Best Fiction Zine ====
- Bobby & Mike #1, Edited by Peter & Jimmy Reilly
- Spock, Edited by Katherine Shade
- Strange Matter, Edited by Sian O'Neale
- The Mentor, Edited by Ron Clarke

==== Best Audio Visual ====
- Constantinople Closing Ceremony (Performance) by George Ivanoff & Ian Gunn
- Constantinople Masquerade Video (Video Compilation) by Carol Tilley
- Constantinople Opening Ceremony (Video/Performance) by George Ivanoff & Ian Gunn
- Constantinople Party Animation (Computer Animation) by Kerri Valkova

=== 1996: The Festival of the Imagination, April 4–8, Kings Hotel Perth ===
==== Best Fan Fiction Zine ====
- Ethel the Aardvark, edited by Paul Ewins

==== Best Fan Newsletter ====
- Thyme, edited by Alan Stewart

==== Best Media Fan Writer ====
- Ian Gunn

==== Best Media Artist ====
- Ian Gunn

==== Best Amateur Audio/Visual Production ====
- The Dalek Tapes (Albert Q.)

=== 1997 Basicon 2, 27–28 September 1997 YWCA Cato Conference Centre, Elizabeth St, Melbourne ===
==== Best Australian Fan Fiction Zine ====
- Alliance edited by Cavell Gleeson & Jeremy Sadler
- Babyloney 5 written & illustrated by Peter Reilly

==== Best Australian Fan Newsletter ====
- The Communicator, edited by Derek Screen
- Frontier, edited by Katharine Maxwell
- Oscillation Overthruster, edited by Sue Ann Barber
- Thyme, edited by Alan Stewart

==== Best Australian Media Fan Writer ====
- Sue Ann Barber
- Paul Ewins
- Ian Gunn
- George Ivanoff
- Karen Pender-Gunn
- Margaret Walsh

==== Best Australian Media Fan Artist ====
- Ian Gunn
- Tracy Hamilton
- Steve Scholz
- Kerri Valkova
- Phil Wlodarczyk

==== Best Australian Amateur Audio/Visual Production ====
- Enterprise Web Site David Barker (https://web.archive.org/web/19980428161222/http://aba.net.au/people/susien/enterprise/)
- Star Trek 30th Anniversary Tribute Video (screened at Multiverse II) Danny Heap
- Zero G (3RRR radio program) Robert Jan

== See also ==
- Chandler Award
- Ditmar Award
  - Ditmar Award results
