= Displaced Person (novel) =

1979 novel by Australian writer Lee Harding

- Author: Lee Harding
- Language: English
- Genre: Young adult
- Publisher: Hyland House
- Publication date: 1979
- Publication place: Australia
- Media type: Print
- Pages: 139 pp.
- Awards: Children's Book of the Year Award: Older Readers (1980)
- ISBN: 0908090153
- Preceded by: The Web of Time (1979)
- Followed by: Waiting for the End of the World (1983)

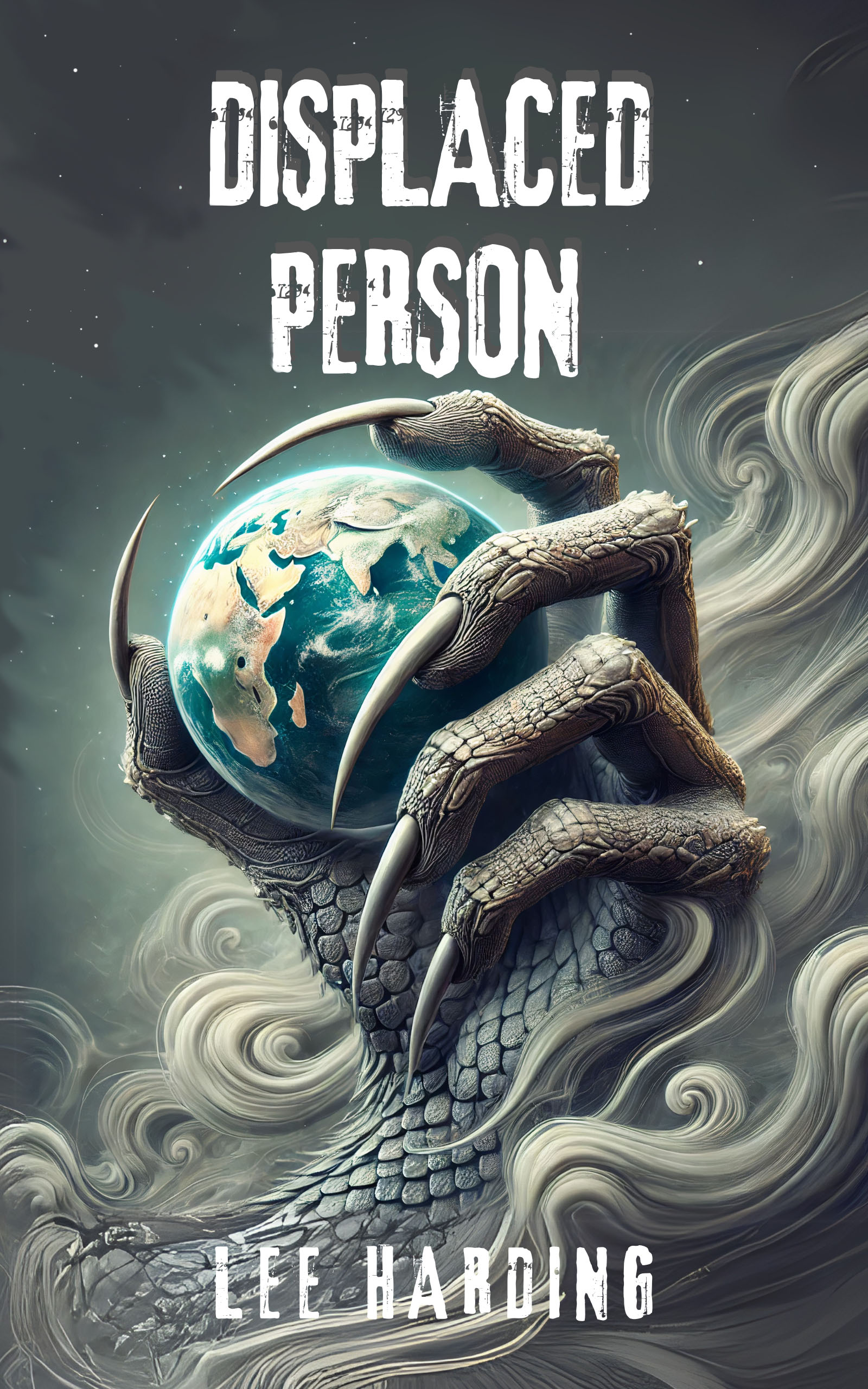

Displaced Person (1979) is a novel by Australian writer Lee Harding. It was originally published by Hyland House in Australia in 1979, and simultaneously in USA by Harper & Row, under the title Misplaced Persons.

While meant for young adults, the readership has expanded to include people of all ages.

== Synopsis ==
The story follows Graeme, an ordinary Australian teenager, who begins to experience a disturbing unraveling of his reality. It starts subtly - he’s ignored while ordering at a fast food restaurant. Soon, even his parents and girlfriend fail to acknowledge his presence, no matter how loudly he speaks. As his interactions with the world become increasingly one-sided, Graeme finds himself slipping through the cracks of existence. The vibrant world around him fades into monochrome, leaving him in a grey, lifeless version of reality where he appears to be vanishing altogether.

Blending elements of cosmic horror with science-fiction, the novel explores themes of identity, alienation, and the fragile boundaries between self and society.

== Dedication and Epigraph ==
- Dedication: For Margaret, La Belle Dame sans Merci, Without whom...
- Epigraph: All that we see or seem is but a dream within a dream. - Edgar Allan Poe.

== Publishing history ==
After its initial publication in Australia by Hyland House in 1979, and its publication in USA at the same time by Harper & Row the novel was reprinted as follows:

- Penguin Books, Australia, 1981
- Puffin, Australia, 1982
- Bantam Books, USA, 1983
- Penguin Books, UK, 1988
- Puffin Books - 1991
- Rogues & Scoundrels - 2025

The novel was also translated into Swedish in 1981, and German in 1987.

== Critical reception ==
Writing in The Canberra Times Ralph Elliott noted: "This is a story with almost as many levels as medieval allegory. It can be read as science fiction, as a psychological study of adolescent alienation, as an allegory of man in the modern world, or as pure fantasy. It questions man's existence, not inappropriately in Berkeleyan terms, and focuses on problems of relationships, between parents and child, between boy and girl, between adolescent and society."

Algis Budrys, reviewing the book for The Magazine of Fantasy and Science Fiction, noted that "Harding's book duplicates the long processes of time. He has added this furniture to a common primal fear which he may or may not consider an original inspiration, and produced what amounts to a generification. Long after Aldiss and Disch and the rest of those fellows are forgotten, this sort of story will have drifted into the folklore, and when the Almighty looks for what was truly viable in SF, this is what He will find, smoothed off and grayed like some slumped old range of timeworn mountains, far more often than He will encounter some sharp-edged cleft or some bright, shining peak."

== Awards ==
- Alan Marshall Award for Best Unpublished Novel 1977, winner
- Children's Book of the Year Award: Older Readers 1980, winner
- Ditmar Awards — Australian Fiction 1980, shortlisted

== See also ==
- 1979 in Australian literature
