= Edith R. Mirrielees =

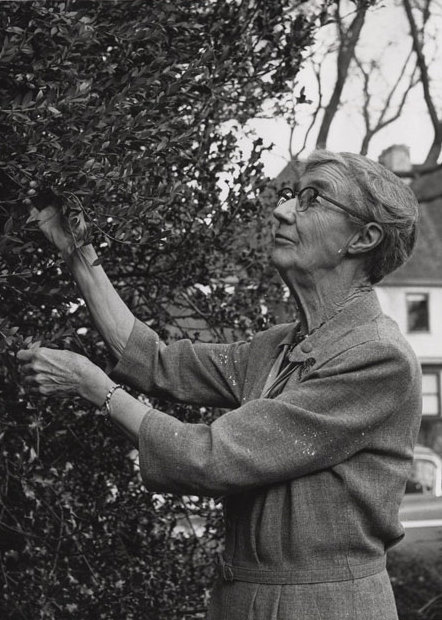
Edith R. Mirrielees

Professor Edith Ronald Mirrielees (September 10, 1878 - June 3, 1962) was a pioneering teacher of creative writing; she inspired many talented, distinguished students, including novelist John Steinbeck at Stanford University.

== Biography ==
Edith Ronald Mirrielees was born on September 10, 1878, in Pittsfield, Illinois, and grew up in Big Timber, Montana.

Before graduating, she taught in Montana public schools. At 25 years old, in 1903, Mirrielees entered Stanford University to study History (later changed to English). She graduated in 1906, B.A. in 1907. As a student, she was the editor of the literary magazine, Sequoia, the associate editor of the yearbook, Stanford Quad, and co-founder of the women's honorary society, Cap and Gown.

From 1909 to 1944, she was first instructor and then professor of English literature at Stanford University. She is best known for her courses in Creative Writing and for the influence she had on such famous American writers as John Steinbeck, Howard Pease, Archie Binns, Allen Drury, and Irma Hannibal. Her book Story Writing (1939, expanded 1947) is an essential reference in the field.

During World War I, she served with the Stanford Red Cross unit in France. She was an advisor on educational matters to the Bureau of Indian Affairs.

After retirement, she founded and published the magazine Pacific Spectator (1947-1951).

In 1951, she wrote the foreword for the speculative fiction anthology World of Wonder, edited by Fletcher Pratt.

In 1959, she published Stanford: The Story of a University.

In 1961, Mills College awarded her an honorary doctorate in Letters in recognition of her outstanding contribution as a professor.

She spent the last year of her life writing Stanford mosaic: reminiscences of the first seventy years at Stanford University, a tale of memories of Stanford's first seventy years.

She corresponded with Avis De Voto, Bernard De Voto, Mary Stegner, Wallace Stegner, and Harry Bush. She was friends with Robert Frost.

Mirrielees died on June 3, 1962, in Stanford, California.

== Legacy ==
Mirrielees House at Stanford University is an apartment residence used primarily for upperclass students.

Stanford University endows the Edith Mirrielees Professorship in Creative Writing.

Montana State University holds the Edith R. Mirrielees Prize competition.
