= Erin McKean =

American lexicographer

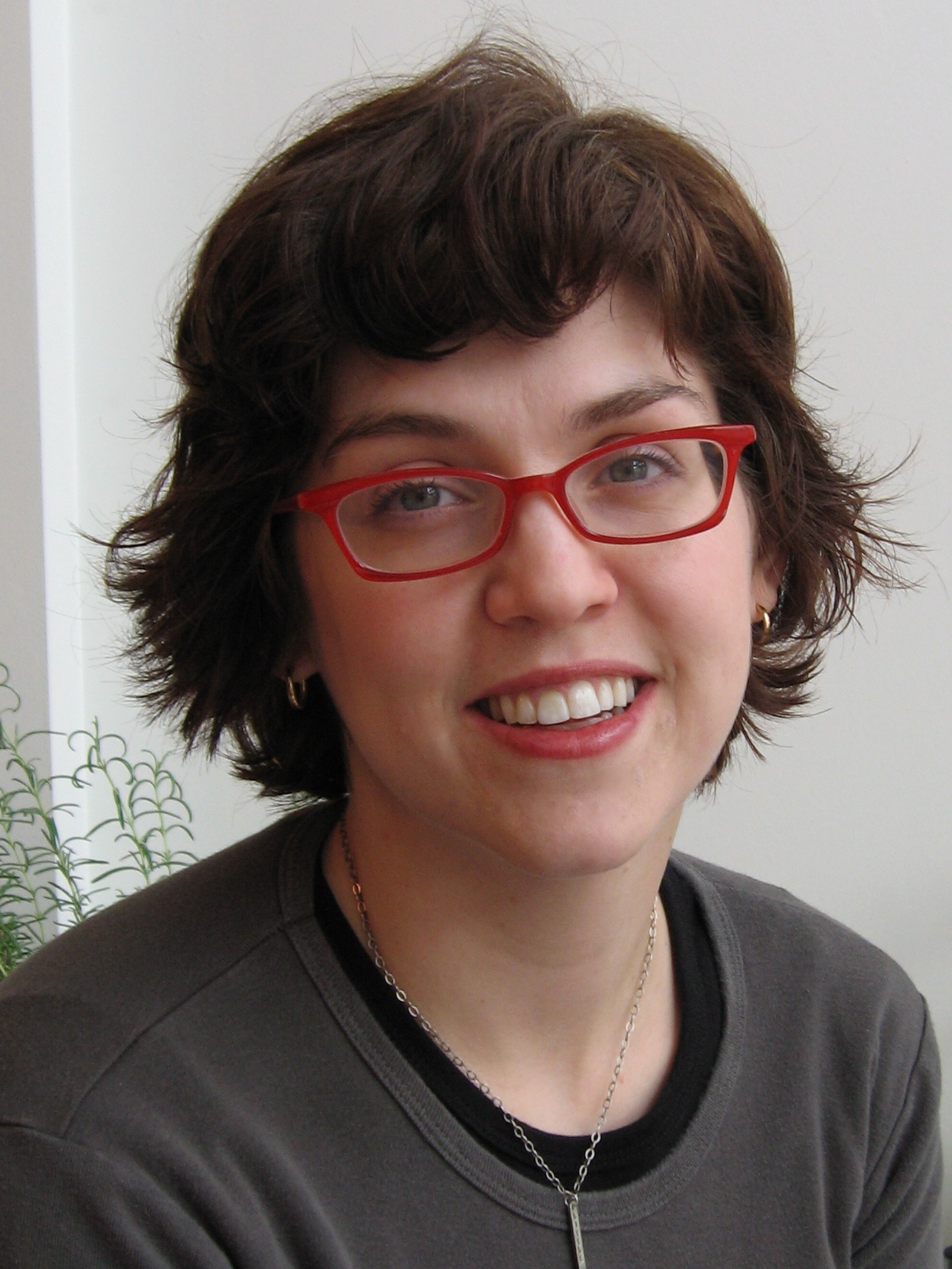
- McKean in 2006
- Born: 1971 (age 54–55); Charlotte, North Carolina, U.S.
- Education: University of Chicago (BA, MA)
- Occupation: Lexicographer

Erin McKean (born 1971) is an American lexicographer and journalist. She has been employed as a lexicographer by Oxford University Press and her books include Weird and Wonderful Words.

== Early life and education ==
McKean was born in Charlotte, North Carolina. She graduated from the University of Chicago with a BA/MA in Linguistics. As an undergraduate, she worked in a junior capacity on the Chicago Assyrian Dictionary. She has since served on the Visiting Committee to the University of Chicago's Regenstein Library, and she helped organize a dictionary-themed exhibit, The Meaning of Dictionaries, there in 2007.

== Career ==
McKean is a founder of Reverb, which makes the online dictionary Wordnik. She was previously the editor in chief of US Dictionaries for Oxford University Press and Principal Editor of The New Oxford American Dictionary, second edition.

McKean is also the editor of VERBATIM: The Language Quarterly, and edited a collection of work from that publication, Verbatim: From the bawdy to the sublime, the best writing on language for word lovers, grammar mavens, and armchair linguists (Mariner Books, 2001). McKean's novel The Secret Lives of Dresses was a best-seller in Australia, and has been optioned for film. She writes about dresses in her blog, A Dress A Day.

She wrote frequently for "The Word" column in The Boston Globe. from 2008 through 2011 and wrote "The Week in Words" for The Wall Street Journal from 2011 through mid-2013. She has also written for The New York Times On Language column.

She was previously a member of the advisory board of the Wikimedia Foundation (c. 2009) and was an advisor to Credo Reference (c. 2011).

McKean's 2007 TED talk, "Redefining the Dictionary", was the genesis for the founding of Wordnik.com. She has also spoken at Pop!Tech, Mark Hurst's third annual Gel conference, and Thinking Digital, and gave a Wordnik demo at the All Things Digital D8 conference in 2010. McKean sews her own clothes and often makes "stunt dresses" for speeches, including the Tetris-themed dress she wore to speak at the Web 2.0 Summit in 2009.

In 2010, McKean was named an honorary fellow of the Society for Technical Communication.

McKean has formulated 'McKean's law', also known as Muphry's law: "Any correction of the speech or writing of others will contain at least one grammatical, spelling or typographical error."

"Prettiness is not a rent you pay for occupying a space marked ‘female'.", a quote from McKean's blog, A Dress A Day, has been widely shared on social media. Since the original post features a large picture of Diana Vreeland, the quote has occasionally been misattributed to her.

== Books ==
- Weird and Wonderful Words (illustrated by Roz Chast, with an introduction by Simon Winchester, Oxford, 2002)
- More Weird and Wonderful Words (illustrated by Danny Shanahan), Oxford, 2003)
- Totally Weird and Wonderful Words (Oxford, 2006)
- That’s Amore (Walker & Company, 2007)
- The Secret Lives of Dresses (Grand Central, 2011)
- Aftercrimes, Geoslavery, and Thermogeddon: Plus 157 More Words From a Lexicographer's Notebook (TED Books, 2011)
- The Hundred Dresses (illustrated by Donna Mehalko, Bloomsbury, 2013)
