= Fumblerules =

Rule of language or linguistic style that breaks the rule

A fumblerule is a rule of language or linguistic style, humorously written in such a way that it breaks this rule.

The science editor George L. Trigg published a list of such rules in 1979. The term fumblerules was coined in a list of such rules compiled by William Safire on Sunday, 4 November 1979, in his column "On Language" in The New York Times. Safire later authored a book titled Fumblerules: A Lighthearted Guide to Grammar and Good Usage, which was reprinted in 2005 as How Not to Write: The Essential Misrules of Grammar.

== Examples ==
- "Avoid clichés like the plague."
- "Don't use contractions."
- "Ending a sentence with a preposition is one thing that I will not put up with."
- "English is the crème de la crème of all languages."
- "Eschew obfuscation, espouse elucidation."
- "It is bad to carelessly split infinitives."
- "Never use no double negatives."
- "No sentence fragments."
- "Parentheses are (almost always) unnecessary."
- "The passive voice should never be employed."
- "You should not use a big word when a diminutive one would suffice."
- "And don't begin a sentence with a connective."
- "Using discourse markers in academic writing basically sounds terrible, you know."
- "Don't use semicolons to separate sentence fragments; bad writing."

== See also ==
- Muphry's law – Adage about hypocritical proscription
- Epimenides paradox, a self-referential statement by a Cretan that "All Cretans are liars."
- The Hacker Writing Style section of the Jargon File includes humorous examples of self-referential examples in copyediting, such as "This sentence no verb.", "Bad speling", and "Incorrectspa cing".
