= Häpna! =

Häpna! (meaning Be amazed! in English) was a Swedish science fiction magazine published between March 1954 and 1969 by Grafiska Förlaget Kindberg & Söner AB in Jönköping. The first issue of the magazine was subtitled Science Fiction Tidsdrift, but it was changed to Science Fiction Teknishka Aventyr by the second issue.

Karl G. Kindberg was the publisher of the magazine. It was published each month up to January 1965, then irregularly until January 1966; the final year, 1969, an attempt was made to revive the magazine which led to the final four issues. The editor was Kjell Ekström, except for the final year when Sam J. Lundwall took over.

The content included some Swedish material, but mostly anonymous translations of the works of Ray Bradbury, Robert A. Heinlein and Isaac Asimov.

== See also ==
- Science fiction magazine
- Fantasy fiction magazine
- Horror fiction magazine
