= The Anarch Lords =

1981 novel by A. Bertram Chandler

- Cover
- Author: A. Bertram Chandler
- Language: English
- Series: The Rim Worlds
- Genre: Science Fiction novel
- Publisher: DAW books
- Publication date: 1981
- Publication place: Australia
- Media type: Print
- Pages: 208 pp.
- ISBN: 0879976535
- Preceded by: Star Loot
- Followed by: The Last Amazon

The Anarch Lords is a science fiction novel by A. Bertram Chandler published in 1981.

The novel features the author's recurring character John Grimes and forms part of his Rim Worlds sequence.

== Plot summary ==
John Grimes is given the job of Planetary Governor of Liberia when his Master Astronaut's Certificate of competency gets withdrawn.

== Reception ==
Greg Costikyan reviewed The Anarch Lords in Ares Magazine #13 and commented that "A. Bertram Chandler isn't exactly the next James Joyce, but he's a pleasant man with whom to spend an evening."

== Reviews ==
- Review by Charles Platt (1982) in The Patchin Review, Number Three
