= Swancon =

Science fiction convention in Perth, Western Australia

SwanCon is a science fiction convention held in Perth, Western Australia. It is Australia's longest-running science fiction convention, and probably the longest-running in the southern hemisphere.

It was founded in 1975 by Grant Stone, with the first convention held in 1976, and has been run annually since. It is generally run by different committees of volunteers each year, and committees bid for the right to run the convention two years in advance.

In recent years it has been run as a project of the Western Australian Science Fiction Foundation (WASFF), with that year's committee reporting to the WASFF board. The convention is frequently run at Easter, but has been run at other times, though typically in the first half of the year, and is generally held in a hotel. It generally attracts 250–300 attendees. It will normally have guests attending including at least one international author, and international guests have included Robert Silverberg, Bob Shaw, Anne McAffrey, Terry Pratchett, Neil Gaiman, Brandon Sanderson, Charles Stross, and David Zindell. Australian guests have included John Birmingham, Marianne de Pierres, Kim Wilkins and Kate Forsyth.

SwanCon first hosted the Australian National Science Fiction Convention in 1980, and has done so relatively regularly since. In 2011, SwanCon hosted the 50th Australian National Science Fiction Convention, including guests Ellen Datlow, Justina Robson and Sean Williams.

== Tin Duck Awards ==
The Tin Duck Awards are the Western Australian science fiction achievement awards. They are given out annually at SwanCon and voted on by members of the convention.

They were first presented in 1980 at SwanCon 5. The Tin Duck design, after which the Awards were named, was by Rob McGough.
