= The Penguin World Omnibus of Science Fiction =

The Penguin World Omnibus of Science Fiction is an anthology edited by Brian W. Aldiss and Sam J. Lundwall published in 1986.

== Plot summary ==
The Penguin World Omnibus of Science Fiction is an anthology which includes stories written by authors from 26 countries.

== Reception ==
Dave Langford reviewed The Penguin World Omnibus of Science Fiction for White Dwarf #82, and stated that "It's oddly like an historical collection: a language's SF moves further from the Wellsian tale of wonder as sophistication and schlock accumulate, and for all the skills of the English speakers here, the more "isolated" authors can be closer to the wellsprings."

== Reviews ==
- Review by Jon Wallace (1954 -) (1986) in Vector 135
- Review by Darrell Schweitzer (1987) in Aboriginal Science Fiction, November–December 1987
