= Leigh Edmonds =

Australian historian

- Education: Australian National University (BA, Hons); Murdoch University (PhD); Edith Cowan University (GradCert)
- Occupations: Academic, author, public servant

Leigh Edmonds is an Australian historian and honorary research fellow at the Collaborative Research Centre in Australian History at Federation University in Ballarat, Australia. His area of research is Australian History, in particular the history of Australian aviation. He is also a research fellow at the CAHS & Airways Museum.

In 2015, publication began on Edmonds' three volume A History of Civil Aviation in Australia which charts aviation in Australia from 1900 to 2000.

== Early career ==
Edmonds started work as a base grade Clerk in Head Office of the Department of Civil Aviation in 1965. He served in the Airworthiness, Aviation Medicine and Airports Branches for the following decade. He worked on teams writing Provisional Master Plans for aerodromes that were to be handed over to local ownership and was promoted to take charge of the Airports Division’s ministerial responsibilities in 1979.

The Airports Division was transferred from Melbourne to Canberra in 1979. While undertaking his work there, he enrolled as a part time student at the Australian National University, studying political science, sociology and history. At the end of the first year he was invited to enter the honours streams of the Political Science and History Departments and chose history. His thesis examined the origins of the Department of Civil Aviation in 1938.

He qualified with a doctorate from Murdoch University, after having been a public servant in the Australian Public Service for more than 20 years.

== Academia ==
He has written books about Western Australia and national Australian topics.

In 1987 Edmonds resigned from the Department to follow an academic career, beginning with enrolment at Murdoch University as a PhD candidate. His research topic was the creation of a civil aviation industry in Western Australia in the interwar period. More recently he has specialized in researching and writing commissioned histories for organizations such as roads authorities, water authorities, electricity authorities, schools and the Australian Taxation Office, and currently has a dozen titles to his name.

As of 2016 Edmonds is working on a three volume concise history of Australian civil aviation in the twentieth century. It focuses on the social, economic, political and technical environments in which civil aviation developed in Australia. The first volume, which covers the period up until the beginning of the Second World War in 1939, was published in 2015. The second volume which takes the story up until the mid 1970s was published in 2017. He is presently completing a third volume, which takes the history of aviation to the year 2000.

Edmonds has also contributed to the Australian Dictionary of Biography.

== Publications ==
- Edmonds, Leigh (1997), The vital link : a history of Main Roads Western Australia 1926-1996, University of Western Australia Press (published 1996), ISBN 978-1-876268-06-0
- Edmonds, Leigh (2000), Cathedrals of power : a short history of the power-generating infrastructure in Western Australia 1912-1999, University of Western Australia Press, ISBN 978-1-876268-42-8
- Edmonds, Leigh; Australian Taxation Office (2010), 100: Working for all Australians 1910-2010 : a brief history of the Australian Taxation Office (1st ed.), Australian Taxation Office, ISBN 978-0-9808067-2-4
- Edmonds, Leigh (2005), Living By Water : A history of Barwon Water and its predecessors, Sands Print Group, ISBN 0-9594919-5-3
