= Sam J. Lundwall =

Swedish writer (born 1941)

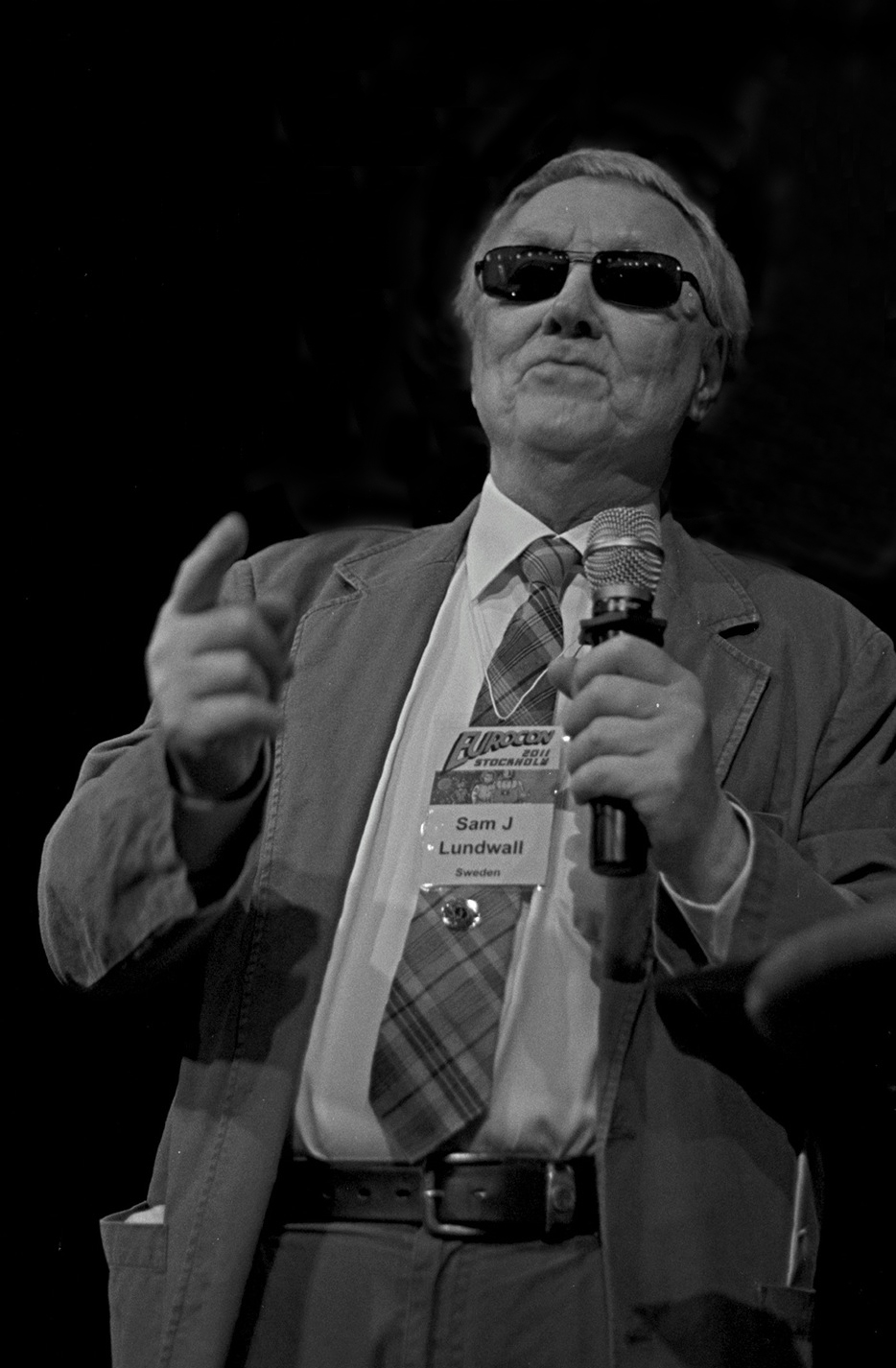
Sam J. Lundwall at Eurocon 2011 in Stockholm.

Sam Thore Jerrie Lundwall (born 24 February 1941), published as Sam J. Lundwall, is a Swedish science fiction writer, translator, publisher and singer. He translated a number of science-fiction-related articles and works from Swedish into English.

== Career ==
Lundwall debuted as a writer in the 1950s for Häpna! During the 1960s he was active as a photographer and freelance writer. He also produced the LP Visor i vår tid. In 1968, he worked as a television producer for Sveriges Radio and made a series about science fiction. In 1969, he published his first book-length work on science fiction, Science Fiction: Från begynnelsen till våra dagar. This landed him a job at Askild & Kärnekull (A&K) as an editor for their science fiction books. He subsequently translated this work into English, where it was published in the US in 1971 as Science Fiction: What It's All About. This work was compared favorably to other studies of science fiction coming out at that time, such as New Maps of Hell, Billion Year Spree, Seekers of Tomorrow, In Search of Wonder, and The Universe Makers. In the summer of 1973, he left A&K and worked with Delta Förlag that he ran together with the literary agent Gunnar Dahl. Until the end of the 1980s Delta published about 200 science fiction books. During the 1990s Lundwall continued publishing science fiction on his own company, Sam J. Lundwall Fakta & Fantasi.

Lundwall was also the editor of the science fiction magazine Jules Verne-Magasinet between 1972 and 2009 and has been active in fandom, for instance he organised conventions in Stockholm in 1961, 1963, 1973, 1975, 1977 and 1979. He has been both a board member and chairman (twice) of World SF and north European coordinator for Science Fiction Writers of America. He has also been very productive as a translator.

== Bibliography ==
=== Non-fiction ===
- Bibliography of Science Fiction and Fantasy, 1964 (updated several times since then)
- Bibliografi över science fiction & fantasy 1830–1961 (1962)
- Bibliografi över science fiction & fantasy 1772–1964 (1964)
- Science fiction: Från begynnelsen till våra dagar (1969)
- Science Fiction: What it's All About (English translation of above) (1971)
- Bibliografi över science fiction & fantasy 1741–1973 (1974)
- Utopia – dystopia (1977)
- Science Fiction: An Illustrated History (1977)
- Utopier och framtidsvisioner (1984)
- Bibliografi över science fiction & fantasy 1974–1983 (1985)
- En bok om science fiction, fantastik, futurism, robotar, monster, vampyrer, utopier, dystopier och annat märkvärdigt och oväntat och osannolikt (1993)
- Bibliografi över science fiction & fantasy 1741–1996 (1997)

=== Fiction ===
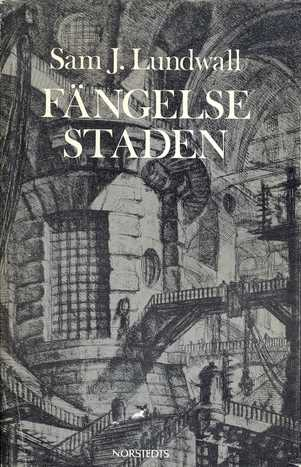
Cover of Fängelsestaden (1978) featuring an etching by Giovanni Battista Piranesi

- Mot tidhavets stränder (1959–1962)
- Jag är människan (1963–1965)
- Alice's World (Ace, 1971)
- No Time for Heroes (Ace, 1971); translated into Swedish in 1972 as Inga hjältar här
- Bernhard the Conqueror (Daw, 1973); translated into Swedish in 1973 as Uppdrag i universum
- King Kong Blues (1974); translated into English in 1975 as 2018 A.D. or the King Kong Blues
- Alice, Alice! (1974)
- Bernhards magiska sommar (1975)
- Mörkrets furste, eller Djävulstornets hemlighet (1975)
- Tio sånger och Alltid Lady Macbeth (1975)
- Gäst i Frankensteins hus (1976)
- Mardrömmen (1977)
- Fängelsestaden (1978)
- Flicka i fönster vid världens kant (1980)
- Crash (1982)
- Tiden och Amélie (1986)
- The Penguin World Omnibus of Science Fiction (1986), edited along with Brian Aldiss
- Frukost bland ruinerna (1988)
- Gestalter i sten (1988)
- Vasja Ambartsurian (1990)
- Zap! (1992)
- Staden vid tidens ände eller Sam Spade i kamp mot entropin (1993)
