= Tom Buckland =

English cricketer

Personal information
- Full name: Tom George Buckland
- Born: 20 November 1860; Sutton-in-Ashfield, Nottinghamshire, England
- Died: 18 July 1915 (aged 54); Sutton-in-Ashfield, Nottinghamshire, England
- Batting: Right-handed
- Bowling: Right-arm fast-medium

Domestic team information
- Years: Team
- 1888: Nottinghamshire

Career statistics
Competition	First-class
Matches	2
Runs scored	23
Batting average	11.50
100s/50s	–/–
Top score	12
Balls bowled	236
Wickets	4
Bowling average	17.00
5 wickets in innings	–
10 wickets in match	–
Best bowling	2/13
Catches/stumpings	–/–
- Source: Cricinfo, 20 May 2012

Tom George Buckland (20 November 1860 – 18 July 1915) was an English cricketer. Buckland was a right-handed batsman who bowled right-arm fast-medium. He was born at Sutton-in-Ashfield, Nottinghamshire. He was registered at birth as Tom George Beastall.

Buckland made two first-class appearances for Nottinghamshire in 1888, against Sussex and Surrey, with both matches played at Trent Bridge. In his first match, Sussex won the toss and elected to bat, making 97 all out in their first-innings, with Buckland taking the wickets of Walter Andrews and Walter Humphreys to finish with figures of 2/13 from thirteen overs. Nottinghamshire responded in their first-innings by making 240 all out, with Buckland ending the innings not out on 9. Sussex were then dismissed for just 69 in their second-innings, with Buckland once again taking two wickets, those of Willie Quaife and Andrews, taking figures of 2/20 from fourteen overs. Nottinghamshire won by an innings and 74 runs. In his second match, Nottinghamshire won the toss and elected to bat first, making 187 all out, with Buckland scoring 12 runs before he was dismissed by Thomas Bowley. Surrey responded to that by making 237 all out in their first-innings, during which he bowled seventeen wicketless overs, conceding 25 runs. In their second-innings, Nottinghamshire made 131 all out, with Buckland run out for 2, to set Surrey 82 for victory. Surrey reached that target in their second-innings with just one wicket lost, with Buckland bowling eight wicketless overs in it.

He died at the town of his birth on 18 July 1915.
