= Bruce Gillespie =

Australian science fiction fan and editor

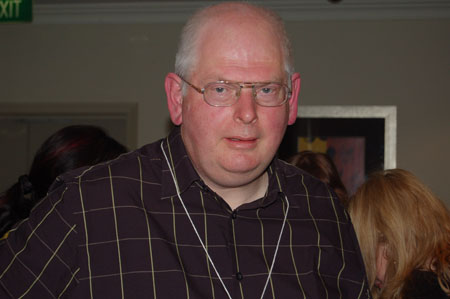
Bruce Gillespie in 2007.

Bruce Gillespie (born 1947) is a prominent Australian science fiction fan best known for his long-running sf fanzine SF Commentary. Along with Carey Handfield and Rob Gerrand, he was a founding editor of Norstrilia Press, which published the Australian edition of Damien Broderick's breakthrough novel, The Dreaming Dragons, in 1980 and published Greg Egan's first novel, An Unusual Angle, in 1983.

Gillespie was fan guest of honour at Aussiecon 3, the 57th World Science Fiction Convention held in Melbourne, Australia in 1999.

He has won and been nominated for many Ditmar Awards since his first nomination in 1970, and in 2007 he was awarded the Chandler Award for his services to science fiction fandom.

== Major Fanzines ==
- SF Commentary (1969 – ) – three times nominated for a Hugo Award for Best Fanzine
- The Metaphysical Review (1984 – )
- Steam Engine Time (2000–2013)
- Treasure (2013 – )

== Awards ==
- Hugo Award for Best Fanzine 1972, SF Commentary, nominated
- Hugo Award for Best Fanzine 1973, SF Commentary, nominated
- Hugo Award for Best Fanzine 1975, SF Commentary, nominated
- Ditmar Award Best Australian Fanzine 1970, SF Commentary, nominated
- Ditmar Award Best Australian Fanzine 1971, SF Commentary, nominated
- Ditmar Award Best Australian Fanzine 1972, SF Commentary, winner
- Ditmar Award Best Australian Fanzine 1973, SF Commentary, winner
- Ditmar Award Best Australian Fanzine 1977, SF Commentary, winner
- Ditmar Award Best Australian Fanzine 1980, SF Commentary, winner
- Ditmar Award William Atheling Jr Award 1980, The Man Who Filled the Void and By Our Fruits, SF Commentary 55/56, nominated
- Ditmar Award Best Australian Fanzine 1981, SF Commentary, nominated
- Ditmar Award Best Australian Fanzine 1982, SF Commentary, nominated
- Ditmar Award William Atheling Jr Award 1982, Sing a Song of Daniel, winner
- Ditmar Award Best Australian SF or Fantasy Editor 1983, Norstilia Press, nominated with Carey Handfield and Rob Gerrand
- Ditmar Award William Atheling Jr Award 1983, SF Commentary: The First Year, nominated
- Ditmar Award Best Australian SF or Fantasy Editor 1984, Norstilia Press, nominated with Carey Handfield and Rob Gerrand
- Ditmar Award Best Australian SF or Fantasy Editor 1985, nominated
- Ditmar Award Best Australian Fanzine 1986, Metaphysical Review, winner
- Ditmar Award Best Australian Fanwriter 1986, nominated
- Ditmar Award Best Australian Fanzine 1987, Metaphysical Review, nominated
- Ditmar Award Best Australian Fanwriter 1989, winner
- Ditmar Award Best Australian Fanwriter 1990, winner
- Ditmar Award Best Australian Fanwriter 1991, winner
- Ditmar Award William Atheling Jr Award 1991, The Non-SF Novels of Philip K. Dick presented at the Nova Mob and published in ANZAPA, winner
- Ditmar Award Best Australian Fanwriter 1992, winner
- Ditmar Award William Atheling Jr Award 1992, Jonathan Carroll, Storyteller, nominated
- Ditmar Award William Atheling Jr Award 1993, James Morrow and the Erni, nominated
- Ditmar Award Best Australian Fanwriter 1994, winner
- Ditmar Award Best Australian Fanzine 1996, Metaphysical Review, nominated
- Ditmar Award Best Australian Fanwriter 1997, winner
- Ditmar Award Best Australian Fanwriter 1998, nominated
- Ditmar Award Best Australian Fanzine 1999, Metaphysical Review, winner
- Ditmar Award Best Australian Fanwriter 2000, nominated
- Ditmar Award Best Australian Fanwriter 2001, nominated
- Ditmar Award Best Australian Fan Production 2001, The Unrelenting Gaze: SF Commentary #76, nominated
- Ditmar Award William Atheling Jr Award 2001, The Unrelenting Gaze: SF Commentary #76, nominated
- Ditmar Award Best Australian Fanwriter 2002, winner
- Ditmar Award Best Australian Fan Production, Fanzine 2002, SF Commentary, winner
- Ditmar Award Best Australian Fanwriter 2004, winner
- Ditmar Award William Atheling Jr Award 2004, winner
- Ditmar Award Best Australian Fanwriter 2005, winner
- Ditmar Award Best Australian Fanwriter 2006, nominated
- Chandler Award, 2007, winner
- Ditmar Award Best Australian Fanzine 2008, Steam Engine Time, nominated

== Book References ==
- Divine Invasions: A Life of Philip K. Dick by Lawrence Sutin
- Gateways to Forever: The Story of the Science-Fiction Magazines from 1970 to 1980: The History of the Science-Fiction Magazine by Michael Ashley
- How Much Does Chaos Scare You? by Aaron Barlow
- PKD: A Philip K. Dick Bibliography by Daniel J. H. Levack, Steven Owen Godersky
- Science-fiction Studies by Dept. of English, Indiana State University
- A Stanislaw Lem Reader by Stanislaw Lem, Peter Swirski
- Supernatural Fiction Writers: Contemporary Fantasy and Horror by Richard Bleiler
- Transrealist Fiction by Damien Broderick
- Twentieth-century American Literature by Harold Bloom
