= Lee Harding (writer) =

Australian photographer and author (1937–2023)

- Born: Lee John Harding; 19 February 1937; Colac, Victoria, Australia
- Died: 19 April 2023 (aged 86); Perth, Western Australia, Australia
- Occupations: Photographer, writer
- Writing career
- Pen name: Harold G. Nye
- Period: 1958–1997
- Genre: Science fiction

Lee John Harding (19 February 1937 – 19 April 2023) was an Australian freelance photographer, who became a writer of science fiction novels and short stories.

== Career ==
Harding was born on 19 February 1937, in Colac, Victoria. He was a fan of science fiction and was among the founding members of the Melbourne Science Fiction Club.

Harding's first published work appeared in the Sydney photographic magazine Photo Digest in 1958: a photographic coverage of the filming of On the Beach, a 1959 adaptation of Nevil Shute's novel On the Beach, in Melbourne and Frankston locations, accompanied by a personal written record of his adventures. This led to a request for a regular monthly column for the magazine on 35mm photography, and a subsequent photographic and written coverage of the filming of The Sundowners in Cooma.

In 1961 Harding's first published short story, Displaced Person, was published in Science Fantasy. He continued to write and submit stories to a range of magazines, including New Worlds, Science Fantasy, and Science Fiction Adventures (UK). In 1966, he became an editorial partner for the fanzine Australian SF Review (ASFR). In 1969 Harding then went on to write for the joint Australian/UK SF magazine Vision of Tomorrow, set up by Ron Graham, plus had stories published in US magazines Galaxy Science Fiction, If and Odyssey, and also Australian magazines, including the Melbourne Sun newspaper. For ABC Education Radio, he wrote two 12–part science fiction serials, Journey Into Time and The Legend of New Earth, and dramatised the H.G. Wells story "The Man Who Could Work Miracles" for the same programme.

From 1972 Harding switched from photography to writing full-time. He published four short paperback novels in Cassell Australia's education series for reluctant readers: The Fallen Spaceman, Children of Atlantis, The Frozen Sky, and Return to Tomorrow. His first adult novel, A World of Shadows was published in 1975 and in the same year he edited the Australian science fiction anthologies Beyond Tomorrow and The Altered I, with assistance from Rob Gerrand and Ursula K. Le Guin. In 1978 he edited Rooms of Paradise, which was also published in the US and UK. Several stories from the latter were also re-printed in the annual US publication, The Year's Best Science Fiction. Four novels followed, including Displaced Person, adapted from his earlier short story, for which he received the 1980 Australian Children's Book of The Year Award. In 1997, he published the non-science fiction novel Heartsease. Harding has also written short stories using the pseudonym, Harold G Nye.

Harding died on 19 April 2023, in Perth, Western Australia.

== Awards ==
- 1970 – Ditmar Award: Best Australian Science Fiction for Dancing Gerontius
- 1972 – Ditmar Award: Best Australian Fiction for Fallen Spaceman
- 1978 – Alan Marshall Short Story Award for an unpublished manuscript Displaced Person
- 1980 – Winner of the Australian Children's Book of the Year Award for Displaced Person
- 2006 – Australian Science Fiction Foundation, Chandler Award in gratitude for his life's work.

Harding also received three Australia Council Fellowships from the Australian Council for the Arts Literature Board.

== Bibliography ==
=== Novels ===
- The Fallen Spaceman (Cassell Australia, 1973) (revised & republished in 1979 by Harper & Row)
- Children of Atlantis (Cassell Australia, 1974)
- A World of Shadows (Hale, 1975)
- The Frozen Sky (Cassell Australia, 1975)
- Return to Tomorrow (Cassell Australia, 1976)
- Future Sanctuary (Laser Books New York #41, Sept. 1976)
- The Weeping Sky (Cassell Australia, 1977)
- Displaced Person (Hyland House, Australia1979) (as Misplaced Persons (Harper & Row, May 1979)) (minor revisions, Penguin (1981))
- The Web of Time (Cassell Australia, 1980) novelisation of radio play Journey Into Time
- Waiting for the End of the World (Hyland House, Australia 1983)
- Heartsease (HarperCollins, Australia 1997)

=== Radio plays ===
- Journey Into Time (Serial: Australian Broadcasting Corporation, c. 1978)
- The Legend of New Earth (Serial: Australian Broadcasting Commission, c. 1979)
- The Man Who Could Work Miracles (adaptation of "The Man Who Could Work Miracles" by H. G. Wells, Australian Broadcasting Commission, c. 1980)

=== Selected short stories ===
Title	Year	First published	Reprinted/collected in
"Dancing Gerontius"	1969	Vision of Tomorrow #2, December 1969	The Second Pacific Book of Science Fiction edited by John Baxter
"Fallen Spaceman"	1971	If, May/June 1971	Expanded to novel length, with same title

Others

- "Soul Survivors" in the collection: New Writings in SF 17, edited by John Carnell (Dobson, 1970)

=== Edited ===
- Beyond Tomorrow : an anthology of modern science fiction (Wren, 1975)
- The Altered I : an encounter with science fiction / by Ursula K. Le Guin and others (Norstrilia Press, 1976)
- Rooms of Paradise (Quartet Books, 1978)
