= A. Bertram Chandler =

British-Australian science fiction author

- Born: Arthur Bertram Chandler; 28 March 1912; Aldershot, England
- Died: 6 June 1984 (aged 72); Sydney, Australia
- Writing career
- Pen name: George Whitley, George Whitely, Andrew Dunstan, S.H.M.
- Period: 1944–1984
- Genre: Science fiction

Arthur Bertram Chandler (28 March 1912 in Aldershot, Hampshire, England – 6 June 1984 in Sydney, Australia) was an Anglo-Australian merchant marine officer, sailing the world in everything from tramp steamers to troop ships, but who later turned his hand to a second career as a prolific author of pulp science fiction. He also wrote under the pseudonyms of George Whitley, Andrew Dunstan and S.H.M. Many of his short stories draw on his extensive sailing background. In 1956, he emigrated to Australia and became an Australian citizen. By 1958 he was an officer on the Sydney–Hobart route. Chandler commanded various ships in the Australian and New Zealand merchant navies, including his service as the last master of the Australian aircraft carrier HMAS Melbourne; by law, the ship was required to have an officer on board while awaiting its towing to China to be broken up. Chandler wrote over 40 novels and 200 works of short fiction, winning the Australian Ditmar Awards for the short story "The Bitter Pill" (in 1971) and for three novels: False Fatherland (in 1969), The Bitter Pill (in 1975), and The Big Black Mark (in 1976). One of Chandler's daughters, Jenny Chandler, married British horror fiction writer Ramsey Campbell. His other children were Penelope Anne Chandler and Christopher John Chandler.

== Writings ==
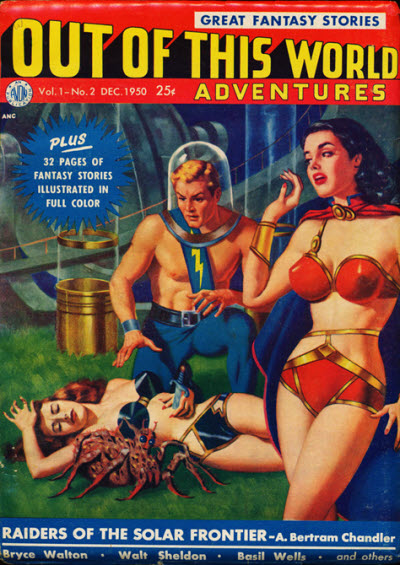
Chandler's novelette Raiders of the Solar Frontier was the cover story in the December 1950 issue of Out of This World Adventures.

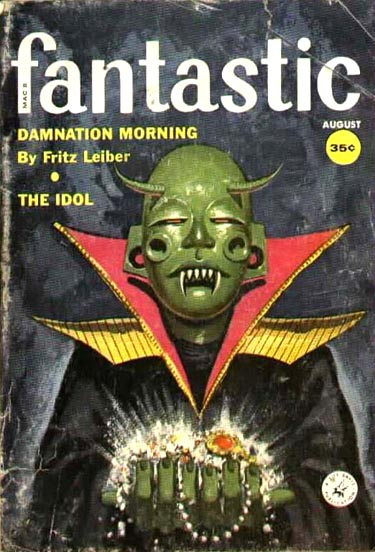
Chandler's "The Idol" was cover-featured on the August 1959 issue of Fantastic

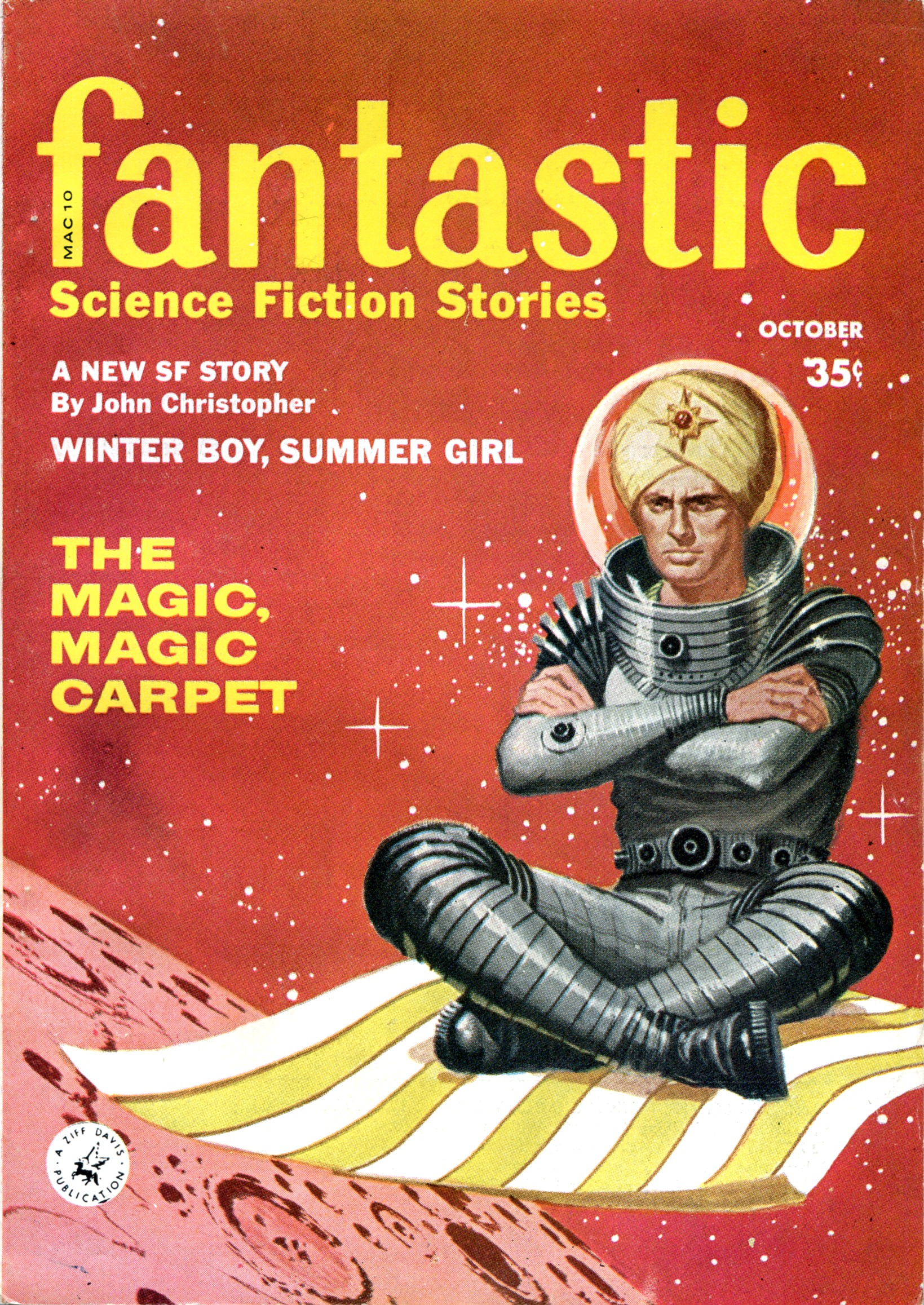
Chandler's novelette "The Magic, Magic Carpet" was the cover story for the October 1959 issue of Fantastic

Chandler's descriptions of life aboard spaceships and the relationships between members of the crew en route derive from his experience aboard seagoing ships, imparting a distinct sense of realism. He was most well known for his Rim World series and John Grimes novels, both of which have a distinctly naval flavour. In the latter, Chandler's principal hero, John Grimes, is an enthusiastic sailor who has occasional adventures on the oceans of various planets. The books make repeated reference to an obsolete type of magnetically powered spaceship known as the "Gaussjammer", remembered nostalgically by "old timers" – clearly modelled on the windjammer. The heyday of the Gaussjammer, some centuries earlier than the Rim Worlds books, is the setting of the less well-known The Deep Reaches of Space (1964) which has undisguised autobiographical elements: its protagonist is a sailor turned science-fiction writer who travels to the future and uses his nautical experience to save a party of humans stranded on an alien planet.

Chandler arrived at the John Grimes series in a rather roundabout way. His original Rim Worlds protagonist was merchant spaceman Derek Calver, who drifted from the galactic centre to the Rim (as Chandler himself had migrated from the U.K. to Australia). In The Rim of Space and The Ship from Outside, Calver's adventures around the Rim included becoming a ship's captain and meeting and marrying Jane "Calamity" Arlen – like him, a refugee from the galactic centre.

Then appeared Sonia Verril, a femme fatale who tempted Calver, nearly ruining his marriage. With this incipient love triangle moving towards a confrontation in deep space, the grumpy John Grimes was introduced as a secondary character very much in the background. Eventually, however, Calver and his wife, Arlen, board the Outsiders' ship and depart from the galaxy and out of all human ken, leaving the stage empty for Verril and Grimes to join in an adventure Into the Alternate Universe, culminating in their marriage, with Grimes thenceforth becoming Chandler's primary character. Chandler provided Grimes with numerous new adventures, as well as charting his career backwards to its humble beginnings, much in the same way as C. S. Forester's fictional naval hero Horatio Hornblower, who in some ways served as a model for the John Grimes character, was first introduced as a captain before his career was sketched backwards to his time as a midshipman.

Chandler's Australian background is evident in his depiction of a future wherein Australia becomes a major world power and Australians take the lead in space exploration and in colonising other planets. Drongo Kane, a pirate captain who is the villain in several books, comes from the planet Austral, and other books mention the planet Australis in another part of the galaxy. His story "The Mountain Movers," part of Grimes's early career, includes a song for future Australian space adventurers, sung to the tune of "Waltzing Matilda", with the first stanza running:

"When the jolly Jumbuk lifted from Port Woomera

Out and away for Altair Three,

Glad were we all to kiss the tired old Earth goodbye;

Who'll come a-sailing in Jumbuk with me?"

The colonists who sing the song end up re-enacting the darker part of Australian history, even dispossessing the natives of the planet Olgana – humanoids who resemble the Indigenous Australians. As revealed at the climax of the story, the resemblance is not accidental. In his novel Kelly Country (1984) Chandler explored an alternate history in which the bushranger Ned Kelly was not captured and hanged, but led a rebellion, ultimately becoming the president of an Australian republic which degenerated into a hereditary dictatorship.

Chandler made heavy use of the parallel universe plot device throughout his career, with many Grimes stories involving characters briefly crossing over into other realities. In "The Dark Dimensions", which is set at a point in space where various realities meet, Grimes (the Rim World commodore), meets a second John Grimes who is still in the Federation Survey Service, as well as characters from the Empress Irene books and Poul Anderson's Dominic Flandry.

In his ironic short story "The Cage", a band of shipwrecked humans wandering naked in the jungles of a faraway planet are captured by aliens and placed in a zoo, where, failing in all their efforts to convince their captors that they are intelligent, some are dissected. Eventually they become resigned to captivity and adopt a small local rodent as a pet, placing him in a wicker cage. Seeing this, their captors apologise for the mistake and repatriate them to Earth, remarking that "only intelligent creatures put other creatures in cages".

Sex is frequent in Chandler's books, often in free fall. Women on board are usually stereotyped in roles of pursers or passengers; seldom are they regular officers in the chain of command. Chandler's protagonists are quite prone to affairs and promiscuous behaviour, but are also shown falling in love and undertaking long-lasting, harmonious marriages; e.g., Sonia Verril served as an officer before marrying Grimes. Relationships are invariably described from the male point of view; whilst women characters might be sympathetic, they are always seen from the outside. In the early Bring Back Yesterday (1961), the dashing Johnnie Petersen is involved with four women in the course of a single book, whose plot lasts no more than a few weeks. Of them, one is inconsiderate and hurts him deeply; one is kindly and motherly, but Petersen is not physically attracted to her; one is a short chance encounter which soon ends with no lasting positive or negative trace; and the last is the one and only great love of his life. Petersen changes time itself in order to save her from a gruesome death and lives happily ever after with her.

== Bibliography ==
=== Rim World series ===
- "Gift Horse" (If, 1958)
- The Rim of Space (Avalon, 1961)
- Beyond the Galactic Rim (Ace, 1963) includes:
  - "Forbidden Planet" (Fantastic Universe, 1959)
  - "Wet Paint" (Amazing, 1959)
  - "The Man Who Could Not Stop" (F&SF, 1959)
  - "The Key" (Fantastic, 1959)
- Rendezvous on a Lost World (Ace, 1961), also as When the Dream Dies (Allison & Busby, 1981)
- Bring Back Yesterday (Ace, 1961)
- The Ship from Outside (Ace, 1963)
- "Rimghost" (Famous SF, 1967)
- Catch the Star Winds (Lancer, 1969)

=== Related to the Rim World and Grimes ===
- The Deep Reaches of Space (1964)

The main story is set in an earlier period of the same future timeline as Grimes, a period in which ships are the magnetic "Gaussjammers", recalled with some nostalgia in Grimes' time.

=== Empress Irene series ===
- Empress of Outer Space (1965)
- Space Mercenaries (1965)
- Nebula Alert (1967)

=== John Grimes novels ===
The John Grimes story is divided here into three parts – Early, Middle and Late.

- Early Grimes – These cover Grimes Survey' Service career, from Ensign to Commander. (The Road to the Rim includes a brief vision on an alternate future in which Grimes remained in the Survey Service and eventually became an Admiral – but this is nowhere else referenced.)
  - The Road to the Rim (Ace, 1967)
  - To Prime the Pump (Curtis, 1971)
  - The Hard Way Up (Ace, 1972) includes:
    - "With Good Intentions" (1972)
    - "The Subtracter" (Galaxy, 1969)
    - "The Tin Messiah" (Galaxy, 1969)
    - "The Sleeping Beauty" (Galaxy, 1970)
    - "The Wandering Buoy" (Analog, 1970)
    - "The Mountain Movers" (Galaxy, 1971)
    - "What You Know" (Galaxy, 1971)
  - The Broken Cycle (Robert Hale, 1975)
  - False Fatherland (Horwitz, 1968), also as Spartan Planet (Dell, 1969)
  - The Inheritors (Ace, 1972)
  - The Big Black Mark (DAW, 1975)
- Middle Grimes – All these deal with Grimes' life and hard times subsequent to his resignation from the Federation Survey Service and prior to his becoming a citizen of the Rim Worlds Confederacy.
  - The Far Traveller (Robert Hale, 1977)
  - Star Courier (1977)
  - To Keep The Ship (Robert Hale, 1978)
  - Matilda's Stepchildren (Robert Hale, 1979)
  - Star Loot (DAW, 1980; Robert Hale, 1981)
  - The Anarch Lords (DAW, 1981)
  - The Last Amazon (DAW, 1984)
  - The Wild Ones (Paul Collins, 1984)
- Late Grimes – Grimes, Rim World Commodore
  - Into the Alternate Universe (Ace, 1964)
  - Contraband from Otherspace (Ace, 1967) (Possibly linked to the 1945 story "Giant Killer")
  - The Rim Gods (Ace, 1969) includes:
    - "The Rim Gods" (1968)
    - "The Bird-Brained Navigator" (1968)
    - "The Tin Fishes" (1968)
    - "Last Dreamer" (1968)
  - Alternate Orbits (aka The Commodore at Sea) (Ace, 1971) includes:
    - "Hall of Fame" (Galaxy, 1969)
    - "The Sister Ships" (Galaxy, 1971)
    - "The Man Who Sailed the Sky" (1971)
    - "The Rub" (Galaxy, 1970)
  - The Gateway to Never (Ace, 1972)
  - The Dark Dimensions (1971)
  - The Way Back (Robert Hale, 1976)

=== John Grimes Saga — Galactic Rim collected works ===
Published by Baen Books:

1. To the Galactic Rim — The Road to the Rim, To Prime the Pump, The Hard Way Up, The Broken Cycle. (2011, 560 pages), ISBN 978-1439134214
2. First Command — Spartan Planet, The Inheritors, The Big Black Mark, The Far Traveller. (2012), ISBN 978-1451638509
3. Galactic Courier — Star Courier, To Keep the Ship, Matilda’s Stepchildren, Star Loot. (2013, 1024 pages), ISBN 978-1451638868
4. Ride the Star Winds — The Anarch Lords, The Last Amazon, The Wild Ones, Catch the Star Winds, plus six short stories. (2012, 880 pages), ISBN 978-1451638127
5. Upon a Sea of Stars — Into the Alternate Universe, Contraband from Otherspace, The Rim Gods, The Commodore at Sea (2014, 640 pages), ISBN 978-1476736365
6. Gateway to Never — The Gateway to Never, The Dark Dimensions, The Way Back. (2015, 656 pages), ISBN 978-1476780474

=== Other novels ===
- The Hamelin Plague (1963)
- Glory Planet (1964)
- The Coils of Time (1964)
- The Alternate Martians (1965)
- The Sea Beasts (1971)
- The Bitter Pill (1974)
- Kelly Country (1983)
- Frontier of the Dark (1984)

=== Other story collections ===
- From Sea to Shining Star (1990)

=== Selected individual stories ===
- "Giant Killer" (1945) (Possibly linked to the 1967 John Grimes novel "Contraband from Other Space")
- "Castaway" (1947) (as by Whitley) early use of Mannschen Drive
- "Preview of Peril" (1948)
- "Coefficient X" (1950)
- "And All Disastrous Things" (1951)
- "Jetsam" (1953)
- "The Cage" (1957)
- "The Half Pair" (1957)
- "The Bureaucrat" (1958)
- "Critical Angle" (1958)
- "Chance Encounter" (1959)
- "The Key" (1959)
- "All Laced Up" (1961)
- "Change of Heart" (1961)
- "The Bird-Brained Navigator" (1968)
- "Last Dreamer" (1968)
- "When I Was in the Zoo" (1968)
- "No Room in The Stable" (1971)
- "Hall of Fame" (1971)
- "The Last Hunt" (1973)
