= Aurealis Award for Best Science Fiction Novel =

Annual Australian award for science fiction

Aurealis Award for best science fiction novel
- Awarded for: Excellence in science fiction novels
- Country: Australia
- Presented by: Chimaera Publications, Continuum Foundation
- First award: 1995
- Currently held by: Tansy Rayner Roberts
- Website: Official site

The Aurealis Awards are presented annually by the Australia-based Chimaera Publications and WASFF to published works in order to "recognise the achievements of Australian science fiction, fantasy, horror writers". To qualify, a work must have been first published by an Australian citizen or permanent resident between 1 January and 31 December of the corresponding year; the presentation ceremony is held the following year. It has grown from a small function of around 20 people to a two-day event attended by over 200 people.

Since their creation in 1995, awards have been given in various categories of speculative fiction. Categories currently include science fiction, fantasy, horror, speculative young adult fiction—with separate awards for novels and short fiction—collections, anthologies, illustrative works or graphic novels, children's books, and an award for excellence in speculative fiction. The awards have attracted the attention of publishers by setting down a benchmark in science fiction and fantasy. The continued sponsorship by publishers such as HarperCollins and Orbit has identified the award as an honour to be taken seriously.

The results are decided by a panel of judges from a list of submitted nominees; the long-list of nominees is reduced to a short-list of finalists. The judges are selected from a public application process by the Award's management team.

This article lists all the short-list nominees and winners in the best science fiction novel category, as well as novels that have received honourable mentions. Since 2003, honourable mentions have been awarded intermittently. Damien Broderick and Jay Kristoff have won the award three times, while five have won it twice – K. A. Bedford, Greg Egan, Amie Kaufman, Sean McMullen, and Sean Williams. Williams holds the record for most nominations with 14. Rory Barnes, James Bradley, Simon Brown, Sara Creasy, Nina D'Aleo, Joel Shepherd, Meagan Spooner, Graham Storrs, and Tess Williams share the record for most nominations without winning, each having been nominated twice.

== Winners and nominees ==
In the following table, the years correspond to the year of the book's eligibility; the ceremonies are always held the following year. Each year links to the corresponding "year in literature" article. Entries with a blue background have won the award; those with a white background are the nominees on the short-list.

* Winners and joint winners
* Nominees on the shortlist

Year	Author(s)	Novel	Publisher	Ref
1995	Greg Egan*	Distress	Millennium	
1995	Sean McMullen	Mirrorsun Rising	Aphelion Publications	
1995	Kate Orman	Set Piece	Virgin Books	
1995	Sean Williams & Shane Dix	The Unknown Soldier	Aphelion Publications	
1996	Sean Williams*	Metal Fatigue	HarperCollins	
1996	Simon Brown	Privateer	HarperCollins	
1996	Tess Williams	Map of Power	Arrow Books	
1997	Damien Broderick*	The White Abacus	Avon Eos	
1997	Damien Broderick & Rory Barnes	Zones	Moonstone	
1997	Simon Brown	Winter	HarperCollins	
1997	Greg Egan	Diaspora	Millennium	
1997	Richard Harland	The Dark Edge	Pan Macmillan	
1998	Sean McMullen*	The Centurion's Empire	Tor Books	
1998	Alison Goodman	Singing the Dogstar Blues	HarperCollins	
1998	John Marsden	The Night Is for Hunting	Pan Macmillan	
1998	Kate Orman	The New Adventures: Walking to Babylon	Virgin Books	
1998	Sean Williams	The Resurrected Man	Voyager Books	
1999	Greg Egan*	Teranesia	Gollancz	
1999	Jonathan Blum & Kate Orman	Doctor Who: Unnatural History	BBC Books	
1999	Damien Broderick & Rory Barnes	The Book of Revelation	HarperCollins	
1999	Andrew Masterson	The Letter Girl	Picador	
1999	Sally Rogers-Davidson	Spare Parts	Penguin Books	
2000	Sean McMullen*	The Miocene Arrow	Tor Books	
2000	James Bradley	The Deep Field	Sceptre	
2000	Sean Williams & Shane Dix	The Dying Light	Voyager Books	
2000	Tess Williams	Sea as Mirror	Voyager Books	
2001	Sean Williams & Shane Dix*	The Dark Imbalance	Voyager Books	
2001	Peter McAllister	Cosmonaut	Penguin Books	
2001	Sean McMullen	Eyes of the Calculor	Tor Books	
2001	Joel Shepherd	Crossover	Voyager Books	
2002	Damien Broderick*	Transcension	Tor Books	
2002	Michelle Marquardt	Blue Silence	Bantam Books	
2002	Sean Williams & Shane Dix	Echoes of Earth	Voyager Books	
2003	Jonathan Blum & Kate Orman*	Fallen Gods	Telos Publishing	
2003	Jay Caselberg	Wyrmhole	Roc Books	
2003	Ian Irvine	Terminator Gene	Simon & Schuster	
2003	Kate Orman	Blue Box	BBC Worldwide	
2003	Sean Williams & Shane Dix	Orphans of Earth	Voyager Books	
2004	Maxine McArthur*	Less Than Human	Warner Aspect	
2004	K. A. Bedford	Orbital Burn	Edge Publishing	
2004	Jack Dann	The Rebel	Flamingo	
2004	Marianne de Pierres	Nylon Angel	Orbit Books	
2004	Sean Williams & Shane Dix	Heirs of Earth	Voyager Books	
2005	K. A. Bedford*	Eclipse	Edge Publishing	
2005	John Birmingham	Designated Targets	Pan Macmillan	
2005	Marianne de Pierres	Crash Deluxe	Orbit Books	
2005	Sean Williams & Shane Dix	Ascent	Voyager Books	
2006	Damien Broderick*	K-Machines	Avalon Publishing Group	
2006	K. A. Bedford	Hydrogen Steel	Edge Publishing	
2006	Andrew McGahan	Underground	Allen & Unwin	
2006	Sean Williams & Shane Dix	Descent	Voyager Books	
2007	David Kowalski*	The Company of the Dead	Pan Macmillan	
2007	Marianne de Pierres	Dark Space	Orbit Books	
2007	Jack Heath	Remote Control	Pan Macmillan	
2007	Sean Williams	Saturn Returns	Orbit Books	
2008	K. A. Bedford*	Time Machines Repaired While-U-Wait	Edge Publishing	
2008	Marianne de Pierres	Chaos Space	Orbit Books	
2008	Simon Haynes	Hal Spacejock: No Free Lunch	Fremantle Press	
2008	Kim Westwood	The Daughters of Moab	HarperVoyager	
2008	Sean Williams	Earth Ascendant	Orbit Books	
2009	Andrew McGahan*	Wonders of a Godless World	Allen & Unwin	
2009	Sean Williams	The Grand Conjunction	Orbit Books	
2010	Marianne de Pierres*	Transformation Space	Orbit Books	
2010	Sara Creasy	Song of Scarabaeus	EOS Books	
2010	Marianne de Pierres	Mirror Space	Orbit Books	
2011	Kim Westwood*	The Courier's New Bicycle	HarperVoyager	
2011	Max Barry	Machine Man	Scribe Publications	
2011	Sara Creasy	Children of Scarabaeus	HarperVoyager	
2011	Peter Docker	The Waterboys	Fremantle Press	
2011	Meg Mundell	Black Glass	Scribe Publications	
2012	Daniel O'Malley*	The Rook	HarperCollins	
2012	Jo Anderton	Suited	Angry Robot Books	
2012	Nina D'Aleo	The Last City	Momentum	
2012	Andrea K. Höst	And All the Stars	Andrea K. Hosth	
2012	Ambelin Kwaymullina	The Interrogation of Ashala Wolf	Walker Books	
2012	Garth Nix	A Confusion of Princes	Allen & Unwin	
2013	Max Barry*	Lexicon	Hachette	
2013	Andrew Macrae	Trucksong	Twelfth Planet Press	
2013	Jane Rawson	A Wrong Turn at the Office of Unmade Lists	Transit Lounge	
2013	Graham Storrs	True Path	Momentum	
2013	Nike Sulway	Rupetta	Tartarus Press	
2014	Marianne de Pierres*	Peacemaker	Angry Robot	
2014	Amanda Bridgeman	Aurora: Meridian	Momentum	
2014	LynC	Nil By Mouth	Satalyte Publishing	
2014	Nina D'Aleo	The White List	Momentum	
2014	Amie Kaufman & Meagan Spooner	Their Shattered World	Allen & Unwin	
2014	Graham Storrs	Foresight	Momentum	
2015	Amie Kaufman and Jay Kristoff*	Illuminae	Allen & Unwin	
2015	Evelyn Blackwell	Crossed	(self-published)	
2015	James Bradley	Clade	Penguin	
2015	Amie Kaufman and Meagan Spooner	Their Fractured Light	Allen & Unwin	
2015	Joel Shepherd	Renegade	Kindle Direct	
2015	Sean Williams	Twinmaker: Fall	Allen & Unwin	
2016	Amie Kaufman and Jay Kristoff*	Gemima: The Illuminae Files 2	Allen & Unwin	
2016	Jane Abbott	Watershed	Penguin Random House	
2016	S. K. Dunstall	Confluence	Ace Books	
2016	D. K. Mok	Squid's Grief	(self-published)	
2016	Daniel O'Malley	Stiletto	HarperCollins Publishers	
2016	Rebekah Turner	Threader	Harlequin Australia	
2017	Jane Rawson*	From the Wreck	Transit Lounge	
2017	Sally Abbott	Closing Down	Hachette Australia	
2017	Claire G. Coleman	Terra Nullius	Hachette Australia	
2017	Daniel Findlay	Year of the Orphan	Penguin Random House Australia	
2017	Krissy Kneen	An Uncertain Grace	Text Publishing	
2017	Cat Sparks	Lotus Blue	Skyhorse	
2018	Jay Kristoff*	Lifel1k3	Allen & Unwin	
2018	Kylie Chan	Scales of Empire	HarperCollins Publishers	
2018	Amie Kaufman & Jay Kristoff	Obsidio	Allen & Unwin	
2018	Angela Meyer	A Superior Spectre	Ventura Press	
2018	Jennifer Mills	Dyschronia	Picador Australia	
2018	Margaret Morgan	The Second Cure	Penguin Random House Australia	
2019	Amie Kaufman* & Jay Kristoff*	Aurora Rising	Allen & Unwin	
2019	Sarah Hopkins	The Subjects	Text Publishing	
2019	Meg Mundell	The Trespassers	University of Queensland Press	
2019	Gillian Polack	The Year of the Fruit Cake	IFWG	
2019	Alice Robinson	The Glad Shout	Affirm	
2019	Rohan Wilson	Daughter of Bad Times	Allen & Unwin	
2020	Laura Jean McKay*	The Animals in That Country	Scribe	
2020	Corey J. White*	Repo Virtual	Tor.com Publishing	
2020	James Bradley	Ghost Species	Penguin/Hamish Hamilton	
2020	Amie Kaufman and Jay Kristoff	Aurora Burning	Allen & Unwin	
2020	Donna Mazza	Fauna	Allen & Unwin	
2020	Kate Mildenhall	The Mother Fault	Simon & Schuster	
2021	Kathryn Barker*	Waking Romeo	Allen & Unwin	
2021	Max Barry	The 22 Murders of Madison May	Hachette Australia	
2021	Rebecca Bowyer	Stealing Time	Story Addict Publishing	
2021	Jason Fischer	Papa Lucy & The Boneman	Outland Entertainment	
2021	Amie Kaufman and Jay Kristoff	Aurora’s End	Allen & Unwin	
2021	Claire McKenna	Deepwater King	HarperCollins Publishers	
2022	T. R. Napper*	36 Streets	Titan	
2022	Rhett Davis	Hovering	Hachette	
2022	Kathryn Hore	The Stranger	Allen & Unwin	
2022	Steve Toltz	Here Goes Nothing	Hamish Hamilton	
2022	Georgina Young	Bootstrap	Text	
2023	Tansy Rayner Roberts*	Time of the Cat	Self-published	
2023	Kylie Chan	Minds of Sand and Light	HarperCollins Publishers	
2023	Roanna McClelland	The Comforting Weight of Water	Wakefield Press	
2023	T. R. Napper	Aliens: Bishop	Titan	
2023	Marko Newman	Dronikus	AndAlso Books	
2023	Keith Stevenson	Traitor's Run	coeur de leon publishing	
2024	J. M. Voss	Temporal Boom	Self-published	
2024	Kate Fitzpatrick	Transported	New Found Books	
2024	Genevieve Gannon	Inheritance	Pantera	
2024	Martin Livings	The Temp	Self-Published	
2024	Tim Winton	Juice	Hamish Hamilton	
2024	Jordan Prosser	Big Time	UQP	
2025	Samira Lloyd	Wastelands	Arianhrod Press	
2025	Candace Bell	Letters to Our Robot Son	Ultimo	
2025	Rhett Davis	Arborescence	Hachette	
2025	Seth Haddon	Volatile Memory	Tor	
2025	J. S. Harman	Dark Sands	Self-published	
2025	Tony Shillitoe	All We Have	Millswood	

== Honourable mentions ==
In the following table, the years correspond to the year of the book's eligibility; the ceremonies are always held the following year. Each year links to the corresponding "year in literature" article.

Year	Author	Novel	Publisher	Ref
2003	Paul Collins	The Earthborn	Tor Books	
2007	Rose Michael	The Asking Game	Transit Lounge	

== See also ==
- Ditmar Award, an Australian science fiction award established in 1969
