= Sharpshooter (disambiguation) =

A sharpshooter is a person who is highly skilled in shooting. It may also refer to:

== Films ==
- Sharpshooters (film), a 1938 American film
- Sharpshooter (2007 film), starring James Remar
- Sharp Shooter (film), a 2015 Indian Kannada-language film
- Sharpshooter (2021 film), a Chinese film

== Naval & Military ==
- 3rd County of London Yeomanry (Sharpshooters), British Army yeomanry/armoured regiment 1901 – 1961
- Kent and Sharpshooters Yeomanry, successor regiment to the above 1961 – 1967
- HMS Sharpshooter, various Royal Navy ships
- Sharpshooter-class torpedo gunboat, a 19th century Royal Navy class

== Songs ==
- "Sharpshooter", a song by Whitford/St. Holmes from their album Whitford/St. Holmes
- "Sharpshooter (Best of the Best)", a song by Rascalz from their album Global Warning

== Sports ==
- Sharpshooter (professional wrestling), a wrestling submission hold
- Louie Espinoza (born 1962), American former featherweight boxer nicknamed "Sharpshooter"

== Other uses ==
- Sharpshooter (insect), leafhoppers in the tribe Proconiini.
- Sharpshooter, a narrow spade
- Sharp Shooter (novel), 2009 crime novel by Marianne Delacourt
