= The White Earth =

2004 novel by Andrew McGahan

- First edition
- Author: Andrew McGahan
- Language: English
- Publisher: Allen & Unwin, Australia
- Publication date: 2004
- Publication place: Australia
- Media type: Print (Paperback)
- Pages: 376 pp
- ISBN: 1-74114-147-8
- OCLC: 223933339
- Dewey Decimal: 823/.914 22
- LC Class: PR9619.3.M3234 W47 2004
- Preceded by: Last Drinks
- Followed by: Underground

The White Earth is a 2004 novel by Australian author Andrew McGahan. The book won the 2005 Miles Franklin Award.

The stage version, adapted by McGahan and Shaun Charles, premiered at Brisbane's La Boite Theatre in February–March 2009.

== Plot ==
The book follows a dual narrative between the perspectives of William and John, where William's takes place over the time period of late 1992 to 1993 and John's takes place from his childhood up to the present of 1993.

William's narrative follows his father dying in an explosion and William and his mother being invited by John to Kuran Station. At the station, William learns from John some stories of the land and is introduced to the water hole. John then organises an anti-Native Title rally, which ends in disaster as it gets out of control. At the rally, William sees a burning man in nausea and John is injured in the chaos. After the rally, John's daughter, Ruth, arrives in awareness of John's injury, and the daughter and father are shown to have a bad relationship. After an argument between John and Ruth, William experiences a moment of realisation and leaves for the water hole. At the water hole, he finds it to be empty, despite it being described as always flowing. After William is driven back to Kuran House by Ruth, he realises that there were bones inside the empty water hole. John drives William to retrieve the bones and proceeds to burn them, resulting in the entire house catching fire.

== Notes ==
Dedication: For my parents, whose life this isn't.

Author's note: This is a work of fiction. While the Darling Downs are real enough, the northern parts of the region do not exist as described here. This story is not meant to portray any actual place, person or event.

== Awards ==
- Festival Awards for Literature (SA), Dymocks Booksellers Award for Fiction, 2006: shortlisted
- International Dublin Literary Award, 2006: longlisted
- Commonwealth Writers Prize, South East Asia and South Pacific Region, Best Book, 2005: winner
- Miles Franklin Literary Award, 2005: winner
- The Age Book of the Year Award, Fiction Prize, 2004: winner
- Queensland Premier's Literary Awards, Best Fiction Book, 2004: shortlisted
- The Courier-Mail Book of the Year Award, 2004: winner

== Critical reception ==
- In the Australian Book Review James Bradley says of McGahan: "Those expecting a novel that continues to explore the sorts of territory marked out in his earlier novels may well be unsettled by the novel's uneasy energies, and by the move away from the urban landscapes he is more readily associated with. Those prepared to follow him will find something uncertain and not easily assimilated, yet possessed of a resonance and symbolic complexity that exceeds anything he has done before. Like Miller and Goldsworthy, McGahan is engaged in an exploration out of the archetypal landscape we all share, a place suspended halfway between the differing meanings of belonging and possession."
- John Tague in The Griffith Review noted: "...the notion of inheritance in The White Earth extends beyond land and property: the novel examines, most profoundly, the residual psychic stains of the past on contemporary and future generations. It is this thread that makes The White Earth such a necessary political novel. It remains a story of urgent relevance to readers of all ages because the social and cultural issues it depicts are just as relevant now as they were nearly twenty-five years ago."

== Stage version ==
La Boite Theatre Company, Brisbane, Australia.

23 February – 21 March 2009

Adapted and Directed by Shaun Charles and Andrew McGahan
Designer Greg Clarke
Lighting Designer David Walters
Sound Designer/Composer Guy Webster
Cinematic Design Markwell Presents
Cast Stace Callaghan, Dan Eady, Penny Everingham, Kathryn Marquet, Veronica Neave, Anthony Phelan & Steven Tandy
