= Shane Dix =

Australian science fiction author

Shane Dix (born 1960 in Wales) is an Australian science fiction author best known for his collaborative work with Sean Williams in the Star Wars: New Jedi Order series.

In addition to his novels with Sean Williams, Dix has had short stories published in various magazines and anthologies, including Aurealis: Australian Fantasy & Science Fiction, Eidolon: The Journal of Australian Science Fiction and Fantasy, Borderlands, Twenty3 : A Miscellany (1998), and Alien Shores: An Anthology of Australian Science Fiction (1994).

While primarily known for his science-fiction work, since 2007 Dix has been branching out into other genres and fields of writing with a number of original novels. Four of these manuscripts are now complete, and he is currently looking for an agent to represent them.

His daughter Katelin Dix is also a writer, with promising work in both teenage and fantasy fiction.

== Bibliography ==
=== Series Contributions ===
Cogal Series (co-written with Sean Williams)

- The Unknown Soldier (1995)

Evergence Series (co-written with Sean Williams)

- The Prodigal Sun (1999)
- The Dying Light (2000)
- The Dark Imbalance (2001)

Orphans (co-written with Sean Williams)

- Echoes of Earth (2002)
- Orphans of Earth (2002)
- Heirs of Earth (2003)

Star Wars: The New Jedi Order (co-written with Sean Williams)

- Force Heretic I: Remnant (2003)
- Force Heretic II: Refugee (2003)
- Force Heretic III: Reunion(2003)
- Or Die Trying (2004 short story co-written with Sean Williams)

=== Novels ===
- Geodesica: Ascent (February 2005) (co-written with Sean Williams)
- Geodesica: Descent (February 2006) (co-written with Sean Williams)

== Awards ==
- 1995 nominated for Aurealis Award for Best Science Fiction Novel for The Unknown Soldier
- 1996 nominated for Ditmar Award for Best Long Fiction for The Unknown Soldier
- 2000 nominated for Aurealis Award for Best Science Fiction Novel for The Dying Light
- 2001 winner of Aurealis Award for Best Science Fiction Novel for The Dark Imbalance
- 2001 winner of Ditmar Award for Best Long Fiction for The Dying Light
- 2002 nominated for Aurealis Award for Best Science Fiction Novel for Echoes of Earth
- 2003 nominated for Aurealis Award for Best Science Fiction Novel for Orphans of Earth
- 2003 winner of Ditmar Award for Best Australian Novel for Echoes of Earth
- 2004 nominated for Aurealis Award for Best Science Fiction Novel for Heirs of Earth
- 2004 nominated for Ditmar Award for Best Novel for Orphans of Earth
- 2005 nominated for Aurealis Award for Best Science Fiction Novel for Ascent
- 2006 nominated for Aurealis Award for Best Science Fiction Novel for Descent
- 2006 winner of Ditmar Award for Best Novel for Ascent

== Biography ==
- Space Invader by Susie O'Brien, The Advertiser 25 March 2000

== Interviews ==
- A Conversation with Sean Williams and Shane Dix with Lisa DuMond, The SF Site, January 2002
- Andromeda Spaceways Inflight Magazine no. 23, 2006, pp 107–111
