= Metal Fatigue (novel) =

1996 sci-fi novel by Sean Williams

- The United Kingdom edition cover art.
- Author: Sean Williams
- Cover artist: Greg Bridges
- Language: English
- Genre: Science fiction
- Publisher: HarperCollins
- Publication date: 29 May 1996
- Publication place: Australia
- Media type: Print (Hardback & Paperback)
- Pages: 458 (first edition)
- ISBN: 978-0-7322-5633-3

Metal Fatigue is a 1996 science fiction novel by Sean Williams. It is set in a world after nuclear war where the metropolis of Kennedy in the United States has become walled off in order to protect itself from the decline of the rest the country.

== Background ==
Metal Fatigue was first published in Australia on 29 May 1996 by HarperCollins in paperback format. In August 1999 Swift Publishers released it in hardback format in the United Kingdom. Metal Fatigue won the 1996 Aurealis Award for best science fiction novel and was a short-list nominee for the 1997 Ditmar Award for best Australian long fiction.

== Plot introduction ==
In the aftermath of a nuclear war, the former USA has become a disaster area. Determined to maintain a functioning modern city, the citizens of Kennedy have walled themselves off from the rest of the country. Forty years after the end of the war, Kennedy is in a critical state, with technologies failing and repairs increasingly inadequate. Kennedy is invited to join the emergent Re-United States of America (RUSA). But some people in Kennedy oppose re-assimilation, and there is a wave of politically motivated crime. As the deadline for reunification approaches, Phil Roads, assigned to investigate the assassinations and data thefts, faces increasing threat not only from the opposing forces, but from his own secret past.

== Cover art ==
The cover art used for the book was an acrylics on board painting called 'Cyber Punk City', created by Australian artist Greg Bridges.
