= Terra Nullius (Coleman novel) =

2017 novel by Claire G. Coleman

- First edition
- Author: Claire G. Coleman
- Language: English
- Genre: Speculative fiction
- Published: 2017 (Hachette Australia)
- Publication place: Australia
- Media type: Print (hardback)
- Pages: 294
- ISBN: 9780733638312
- OCLC: 1104326528

Terra Nullius is a 2017 speculative fiction novel by Claire G. Coleman. It draws from Australia's colonial history, describing a society split into "Natives" and "Settlers."

== Publication history ==
- 2017, Australia, Hachette Australia ISBN 9780733638312
- 2017, USA, Small Beer Press ISBN 9781618731517

== Reception ==
Judges of the Stella Prize called Terra Nullius "an arresting and original novel", while a reviewer for the Sydney Review of Books described it as "a cleverly multiplicitous text" and "an ambitious mirror for settler Australia".

Terra Nullius has also been reviewed by Australian Book Review, Publishers Weekly, Locus, Antipodes, The Adelaide Review, ArtsHub, Kirkus Reviews, and Library Journal.

== Awards and nominations ==
- 2019 Neukom Institute Literary Arts Awards Debut shortlist
- 2019 International Dublin Literary Award longlist
- 2018 Victorian Premier's Prize for Fiction highly commended
- 2018 Tin Duck Award for Best Professional Long Written Work winner
- 2018 Stella Prize shortlist
- 2018 Reading Women Award fiction shortlist
- 2018 Norma K. Hemming Award Long Work winner
- 2018 MUD Literary Prize finalist
- 2018 Australian Indie Book of the Year Debut Fiction longlist
- 2018 Ditmar Award Best New Talent nomination
- 2018 Australian Book Industry Awards Matt Richell award for new writer of the year shortlist
- 2017 Aurealis Award for best science fiction novel shortlist
- 2016 black&write! Indigenous Writers Fellowship winner

== See also ==
- The Old Lie
