= The Crooked Letter =

2004 novel by Sean Williams

- The Crooked Letter first edition cover.
- Author: Sean Williams
- Cover artist: Greg Bridges
- Language: English
- Series: The Books of the Cataclysm
- Genre: Fantasy
- Publisher: Voyager
- Publication date: 30 June 2004
- Publication place: Australia
- Media type: Print (hardback & paperback)
- Pages: 640 pp (first edition)
- ISBN: 978-0-7322-7925-7
- Followed by: The Blood Debt

The Crooked Letter is a 2004 fantasy novel by Sean Williams. It follows the story of Seth and Hadrian who have gone to Europe on holidays. Seth is murdered and they discover that Earth is just one of many realms.

== Background ==
The Crooked Letter was first published in Australia on 30 June 2004 by Voyager in paperback format. It was later released in the United States in both hardcover and paperback in 2006 and 2008 respectively. The Crooked Letter is a prequel to William's earlier Books of the Change series and is the first of four books in The Books of the Cataclysm series. The Crooked Letter won the 2004 Aurealis Award for best fantasy novel and the 2005 Ditmar Award for best novel.
