= Claire G. Coleman =

Australian writer (born 1974)

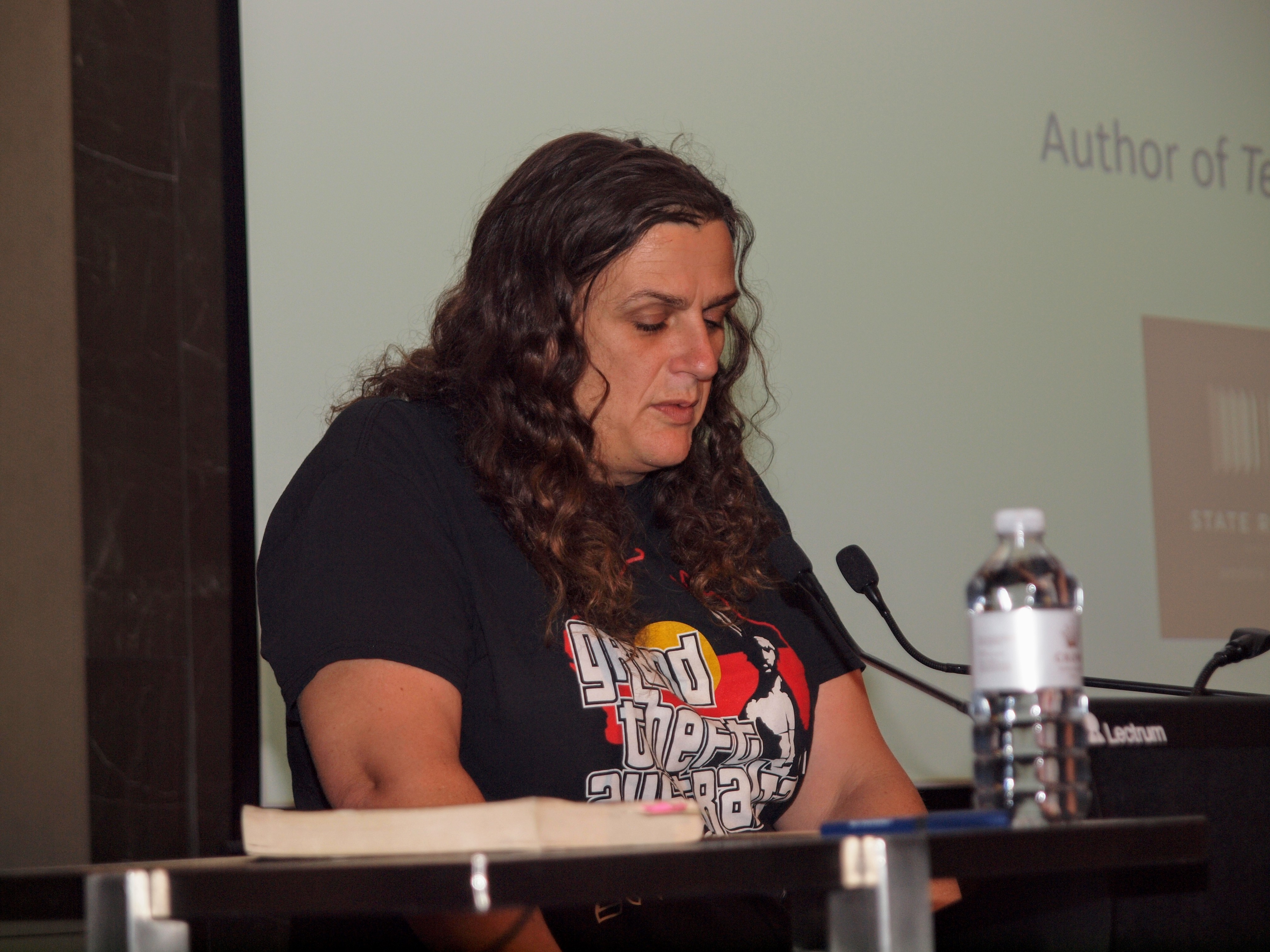
- Coleman delivering the Loris Williams Memorial Lecture, at the Australian Society of Archivists' 2018 annual conference, in Perth, Western Australia
- Born: 1974 (age 51–52)
- Occupations: Author; Poet
- Notable work: Terra Nullius, The Old Lie
- Coleman's voice recorded September 2018
- Website: www.clairegcoleman.com

Claire G. Coleman (born 1974) is an Aboriginal Australian novelist, essayist, and poet from Western Australia. She is known for her 2017 debut novel, Terra Nullius, which won the Norma K Hemming Award, and the non-fiction work Lies, Damned Lies, which won the 2022 University of Queensland Non-Fiction Book Award in the Queensland Literary Awards.

== Early life ==
Claire G. Coleman was born in Perth in 1974. She is a Noongar woman, but has lived most of her life away for her ancestral country, in the state of Victoria, mostly in Melbourne. Her forebears lived in the around Ravensthorpe and Hopetoun on the south coast of Western Australia.

== Career ==
The manuscript of Coleman's debut novel, Terra Nullius, resulted in Coleman being awarded the State Library of Queensland's 2016 black&write! Indigenous writing fellowship. After publication, it won the Norma K Hemming Award.

She gave the Loris Williams Memorial Lecture at the 2018 Australian Society of Archivists conference.

Coleman's essay, "After the Grog War", was shortlisted for the 2018 Horne Prize, while another essay, "Hidden in Plain Sight", was shortlisted for the 2019 Horne Prize.

Coleman has also written short fiction and poetry.

== Awards and shortlisting ==
- 2017: Aurealis Award for best science fiction novel shortlist for Terra Nullius
- 2018: Horne Prize shortlist for "After the Grog War"
- 2018: MUD Literary Prize finalist for Terra Nullius
- 2018: Stella Prize shortlist for Terra Nullius
- 2019: Horne Prize shortlist for "Hidden in Plain Sight"
- 2019: Neukom Institute Literary Arts Awards Debut shortlist for Terra Nullius
- 2019: Queensland Poetry Festival Philip Bacon Ekphrasis Award for "Pelin"
- 2020: Peter Porter Poetry Prize shortlist for "That Wadjela Tongue"
- 2020: Oodgeroo Noonuccal Indigenous Poetry Prize shortlist
- 2022: Queensland Literary Awards: University of Queensland Non-Fiction Book Award for Lies, Damned Lies

== Works ==
=== Novels ===
- Terra Nullius, Hachette Australia, 2017, ISBN 978-0-7336-3831-2
- The Old Lie, Hachette Australia, 2019, ISBN 978-0-7336-4084-1
- Enclave, Hachette Australia, 2022, ISBN 978-0-7336-4086-5

=== Short fiction ===
- Michael Earp, ed. (2019), "Sweet", Kindred: 12 Queer #LoveOzYa anthology stories, Walker Books Australia, ISBN 978-1-7606-5103-9
- Leah Jing McIntosh; Cher Tan; Adalya Nash Hussein; Hassan Abul, eds. (2020), "Wish You Were", Collisions: Fictions Of The Future - A Liminal Anthology, Pantera Press, ISBN 978-0-6487-9518-6
- "Saving Face", The Big Issue, The Big Issue, 2020, ISSN 1326-639X
- Michael Mohammed Ahmad, ed. (2020), "Ostraka", After Australia, Affirm Press, ISBN 978-1-9259-7281-8
- "The Mists Of Down Below", Griffith Review, 70 (4), Griffith University, November 2020, ISSN 1448-2924

=== Poetry ===
- "Strawberry Juice", Australian Poetry Journal, vol. 7, Australian Poetry, 2017, ISSN 2203-7519
- "Concrete Beneath My Feet", Australian Poetry Journal, vol. 7, Australian Poetry, 2017, ISSN 2203-7519
- "#DontMakeMeChoose", Australian Poetry Journal, vol. 8, Australian Poetry, 2018, ISSN 2203-7519
- "Pelin", VerityLa, Verity La Inc., 2019
- "That Wadjela Tongue", Australian Book Review, Australian Book Review Inc., 2020, ISSN 0155-2864

=== Non-fiction ===
- "When we encountered the nomads", Meanjin, vol. 76, Hachette Australia, 2017, pp. 88–94, ISSN 0025-6293
- Lies, Damned Lies: A personal exploration of the impact of colonisation, Ultimo Press, 2021, ISBN 978-1-7611-5009-8
