= Eclipse (Bedford novel) =

2005 novel by K. A. Bedford

- Eclipse first edition cover.
- Author: K. A. Bedford
- Cover artist: Geoff Taylor
- Language: English
- Genre: Science fiction
- Publisher: Edge Science Fiction and Fantasy Publishing
- Publication date: September 8, 2005
- Publication place: Canada
- Media type: Print (Paperback)
- Pages: 309 (first edition)
- ISBN: 978-1-894063-30-2

Eclipse is a 2005 science fiction novel by K. A. Bedford. It follows the story of James Dunne, an officer of the Royal Interstellar Service Academy whose first assignment becomes a nightmare when he is drafted into the First Contact Team.

== Background ==
Eclipse was first published in Canada on September 8, 2005 by Edge Science Fiction and Fantasy Publishing in trade paperback format. The story is loosely based on an old Royal Australian Navy recruiting campaign. It was released in the United States in March 2006. Eclipse won the 2005 Aurealis Award for best science fiction novel.
