= Sara Creasy =

Australian author

- Born: 1968 (age 57–58); England
- Occupation: Writer
- Writing career
- Genres: Science fiction, romance
- Website: www.saracreasy.com

Sara Creasy (born 1968) is an Australian author represented by Kristin Nelson, president of the Nelson Agency out of Denver, CO. She was born and raised in England, before her family moved to Australia when she was a teenager. Her debut novel, Song of Scarabaeus, was published by Harper Voyager in 2010.

== Personal life ==
After studying biology at University she graduated with a bachelor's degree in biology and after many odd-jobs found herself in the educational publishing industry as a text book editor and project editor. She also worked for Aurealis as a copy editor and associate editor. In 2005 she married American science fiction and fantasy author M.C. Planck and moved to Tucson, Arizona. After the publication of her first novel and the birth of her daughter, she moved back to Australia with her family. She now resides in Melbourne.

== Publication ==
Her first novel, Song of Scarabaeus, was published in 2010 by Harper Voyager and earned her nominations for both the Philip K. Dick Award and the Aurealis Award for best science fiction novel. The sequel, Children of Scarabaeus, was published in April 2011 and was nominated for the Aurealis Award for best science fiction novel. In 2019 she began publishing the ten-book Wynter Wild series, a contemporary family drama about a sibling rock band.

== Bibliography ==
=== Scarabaeus ===
- Song of Scarabaeus (2010) USA, Harper Voyager ISBN 0-06-193473-9, Pub date 27 April 2010, Paperback
- Children of Scarabaeus (2011) USA, Harper Voyager ISBN 0-06-193474-7, Pub date 29 March 2011, Paperback
- Little Sister Song (Wynter Wild Book 1) (2019) ISBN 1-09-267325-3, Pub date 4 April 2019, Paperback
