= Troubletwisters (book series) =

Novel series by Garth Nix and Sean Williams

Troubletwisters series
- First edition (AUS) cover of first novel
- Troubletwisters, The Monster
- Author: Garth Nix, Sean Williams
- Cover artist: Jeremy Reston
- Country: United States, Australia
- Language: English
- Genre: Young adult novel
- Publisher: Scholastic Press (USA); Allen & Unwin (AU); Egmont Books (UK)
- Published: May 1, 2011 - current
- Media type: Print
- Followed by: The Monster

Troubletwisters is an ongoing series of young adult fantasy novels by Garth Nix and Sean Williams. The first novel in the series, Troubletwisters was released on May 1, 2011 through Scholastic Press and Allen & Unwin. Williams and Nix have stated that the series will comprise five novels.

== Synopsis ==
The series follows siblings Jaide and Jack as they discover that they are both "troubletwisters" and as such, possess strange abilities. Initially unaware of this fact, this revelation becomes apparent after they are sent to Portland to live with a grandmother they've never met after their house is destroyed in an explosion neither of them can fully explain. Once there, their lives grow even stranger as they continue to experience strange magical scenarios and beings. They eventually discover what it means to be troubletwisters, and that it is up to them to defeat The Evil.

== List of books ==
1. The Magic (2011) (aka Troubletwisters in Australia)
2. The Monster (2012)
3. The Mystery (2013) (aka Mystery of the Golden Card in Australia)
4. The Missing (2014) (aka Missing, Presumed Evil in Australia and the UK)

== Reception ==
Critical reception for the series has been mostly positive, with Cory Doctorow calling the first entry "as marvellous as its pedigree suggests". A reviewer for NorthJersey.com commented that the first volume's story was occasionally frustrating, as some plot elements were overly dragged out with "worn excuses" relating to the age and inexperience of the two main characters. Booklist gave a mostly positive review for The Monster, writing that "[w]hile the resolution is a little too easy (and not easily explainable), it will satisfy most readers."
