= The Rich Man's House =

Final novel by Andrew McGahan

The Rich Man’s House
- First edition
- Author: Andrew McGahan
- Language: English
- Genre: Thriller
- Publisher: Allen & Unwin
- Publication date: 2019
- Publication place: Australia
- Media type: Print (paperback)
- ISBN: 978-1-76052-982-6

The Rich Man's House is the final novel by Australian author Andrew McGahan, published posthumously in September 2019. The author's note reads, in part:

This is my last book. An author can't always say that with certainty, but as I'm in the final stages of dying as I type this, it seems a safe bet.

== Synopsis ==
McGahan constructs a world very similar to our own, varying only in the critical elements necessary for the setting of the novel. The world's tallest mountain is not Mount Everest, but an island peak known as 'The Wheel', of some twenty-five vertical kilometres, located hundreds of kilometres southwest of Tasmania. One man has reached the summit, the 'rich man' of the title, Walter Richman. Others, including George Mallory and Edmund Hillary have died in their attempts. In McGahan's world, Everest itself had been conquered by Tenzing Norgay and Tom Bourdillon.

Following his achievement in 1975, Richman inherits the bulk of an immense fortune, and sometime around 2010, constructs his own house on, and within, an adjacent high peak, Observatory Mount, with views across to the Wheel. Rita Gausse is the daughter of the house's architect, who himself has died, apparently of natural causes, at the house. She is invited by Richman to see her father's work. As the days of her visit proceed, however, it becomes clear to Rita that there are many unsettling mysteries concerning Richman, his ascent of the Wheel, and indeed the house itself.

In her younger years, when she was estranged from her architect father and often under the influence of artificial stimulants, Rita had penned a book, The Spawn of Disparity, in which she postulated the existence of what is behind the indefinable sense that humans often feel in the presence of natural wonders. Indeed, she used the term 'presence' to label this quality which accompanies natural (but inorganic) phenomena, from mountains to surf breaks.

Why does the human mind matter [to a presence]? For a simple and brutal reason: it can kill a presence before that presence's due time. In short, we humans, us, our very thoughts, are poison to the presences we encounter. And that's where the trouble starts.

At a moment when there are only six people, including Rita and Richman, within the vast house, nature appears to awake, initially in the form of a brief earth tremor. The second half of the novel deals with the climactic sequel to this awakening.

== Reception ==
The book was published in September 2019, some seven months after McGahan's death from cancer at the age of 52. Reviews were generally favourable while noting the imperfection that the author himself acknowledged in his note:

... this is not quite the book it would have been had cancer not intervened. That doesn't help with any flaws you might find in the story, but it might explain them, and for once I can fairly plead-I was going to fix that!

In The Canberra Times, Anna Creer notes:

McGahan intersperses his narrative with historical journals, newspaper reports and extracts from Rita's book to create a convincing alternative history of mountaineering and to establish the backstories of his characters. Walt Richman is a remarkable creation, a flawed hero and a narcissistic liar whose hubris inevitably brings nemesis. However, the repeated interruption of the narrative line, at times, destroys the extraordinary tension that the main story line generates. McGahan understood there were flaws in his novel. Readers will not only mourns the loss of McGahan but also the novel this might have been.

Richard Cotter, in The Sydney Arts Guide:

A mountain of a book, THE RICH MAN’S HOUSE is a mansion of rooms – geographical, geological, psychological, architectural, historical and supernatural – with mantles of mystery and thresholds of suspense. It’s not an easy journey to the summit, an avalanche of verbiage detours the ascent, and when the top is reached, you don’t really get to the bottom of the story.

James Ley, writing in the Sydney Review of Books, notes:

In a broader sense, the novel shares with McGahan’s earlier work a desire to draw attention to the precariousness of our position in the universe and the overriding importance of maintaining a sense of perspective and humility.
