= Rowena Cory Daniells =

Australian children's and Science Fiction writer

- Born: 1958 (age 67–68)
- Other names: Rowena Cory, R. C. Daniells, Rowena Cory Daniells, Rowena Cory Lindquist, R. C. Lindquist, Rowena Lindquist; Cory Daniells

Rowena Cory Daniells (born 1958), is an Australian children's writer who also publishes science fiction and fantasy novels and novellas.

== Biography ==
Rowena Lindquist, writes under a number of variations of her name but most as Rowena Cory Daniells. She is from Brisbane where she lives with her husband and children. She has written 26 children's books as well as a number of novels and other works. Daniells has been translated into French, German, Italian and Korean. Daniells co-founded Vision Writers with Marianne de Pierres in 1996 as well as being part of the committees for two of Australia's genre awards and being part of the Queensland Writers Centre, the Brisbane Writers Festival and Fantastic Queensland.

Daniells has won the Aurealis Award for best fantasy short story for The Giant’s Lady which was published in the David Gemmell ‘Legends 2’ anthology. Daniells was awarded the Peter McNamara Achievement Award for services to the speculative fiction genre in 2016.

== Bibliography ==
Fiction Series

T'En milieu

- The Outcast Chronicles

- Besieged (2012)
- Exile (2012)
- Sanctuary (2012)
- The Outcast Chronicles (2017)

- The T'En Trilogy / The Last T'En / The Fall of Fair Isle

- The Last T'En (1999) also appeared as:
- Dark Legacy (2000) also appeared as:
- Dark Dreams (2001)
- Warrior Code (2002)

The Chronicles of King Rolen's Kin
- The King's Bastard (2010)
- The Uncrowned King (2010)
- The Usurper (2010)
- King Breaker (2013)
The Lost Shimmaron
- The Evil Overlord (2007)

Novels

- Mystery at Devon House (1999)
- The Price of Fame (2012)

Chapbooks

- The Intruder (1997)

Short Fiction

- Shallow Seas

- The Faithless Priest and the Nameless King (2004)
- Twisted Beliefs (2006)

- The Intruder (1997)
- Prelude to a Nocturne (1998)
- The Taste of Power (1998)
- The Doll (1999)
- The Scape-grace (2001)
- Movie Madness (2002)
- Bad Things Happen to Good People (2002)
- Suffer the Little Children (2002)
- Sir William Watson's Psychic-meter (2002)
- The Surge (2003)
- Personal Choice (2003)
- Cheating the Devil (2003)
- Lady Bountiful's Lies (2006)
- Soul Shaper (2007)
- Magda's Career Choice (2007)
- Purgatory (2008)
- Tabitha (2010)
- The Choosing (2011)
- The Ways of the Wyrding Women (2013)
- The Giant's Lady (2015)
- The King's Man (2016)
