= Stiletto (novel) =

Novel by Daniel O'Malley

- First edition
- Author: Daniel O'Malley
- Language: English
- Publisher: Little, Brown and Company
- Publication date: 2016

Stiletto is a 2016 novel by author Daniel O'Malley, the sequel to his The Rook. It was published by Little, Brown and Company in 2016.

== Synopsis ==
Following the events of The Rook, Odette Leliefeld, a descendant of the Grafters' leader, finds herself a member of the delegation negotiating a peace agreement between the Belgian Grafters and the British Checquy Group, which share a long history of hostilities. Because of the residual hostility and suspicion between the two groups, Checquy Rook Myfanwy Thomas reassigns Pawn Felicity Clements from a coveted position on an assault team to serve as Odette's personal bodyguard. Meanwhile, a series of manifestations that seem to be of Grafter origin threaten the negotiations. The Checquy Court and the Grafter delegation must broker the peace treaty while mitigating conflicts between members of both organizations and defending against external threats.

The story is primarily told from the point of view of two new characters, Odette Leliefeld and Felicity Clements. Rook Thomas and other members of the Checquy Court appear as supporting characters throughout the novel.
