= Last Drinks =

2000 novel by Andrew McGahan

- First edition
- Author: Andrew McGahan
- Cover artist: Nada Backovic
- Language: English
- Genre: Crime novel
- Publisher: Allen and Unwin, Sydney
- Publication date: 2000
- Publication place: Australia
- Media type: Print Paperback
- Pages: 377pp
- ISBN: 1-86508-406-9
- OCLC: 47033960
- Preceded by: 1988
- Followed by: The White Earth

Last Drinks is a 2000 Ned Kelly Award-winning novel by the Australian author Andrew McGahan.

== Synopsis ==
Ten years after the Fitzgerald Inquiry into Queensland police, disgraced journalist George Verney hears of the death of an estranged friend in the remote town George fled to from Brisbane after the inquiry. George travels back to Brisbane to help arrange the funeral, and to try to find out what caused his friend's death, confronting memories and loose ends from his past.

== Awards ==
- Ned Kelly Awards for Crime Writing, Best First Novel, 2001: winner

== Notes ==
- Author's note: This is a work of fiction. While obviously inspired to some degree by the Fitzgerald inquiry and its era in Queensland, this is not, even for a moment, an historic or factual version of those times. In particular, no character in this book should be mistaken for any actual person, living or dead.
- A stage version, adapted by Shaun Charles, premiered at Brisbane's La Boite Theatre in August 2006.

== Reviews ==
- "Aussiereviews" Book Review: Last Drinks, by Andrew McGahan
- "The Australian Public Intellectual network" Australian Public Intellectual [API Network]
