= Time Machines Repaired While-U-Wait =

2008 novel by K. A. Bedford

- Time Machines Repaired While-U-Wait first edition cover.
- Author: K. A. Bedford
- Cover artist: Rachel Haupt
- Language: English
- Genre: Science fiction
- Publisher: Edge Science Fiction and Fantasy Publishing
- Publication date: August 1, 2008
- Publication place: Australia
- Media type: Print (Paperback)
- Pages: 320 (first edition)
- ISBN: 978-1-894063-42-5

Time Machines Repaired While-U-Wait is a 2008 science fiction novel by Australian writer K. A. Bedford. It follows the story of Spider who repairs time machines for a living until he discovers a corpse inside one of the machines he is fixing - leading the Department of Time and Space to take over the situation.

== Background ==
Time Machines Repaired While-U-Wait was first published in Canada on August 1, 2008 by Edge Science Fiction and Fantasy Publishing in trade paperback format. It has been distributed in both Canada and the United States by Fitzhenry and Whiteside. Time Machines Repaired While-U-Wait won the 2008 Aurealis Award for best science fiction novel and was a short-list nominee for the 2008 Philip K. Dick Award.
