= Wonders of a Godless World =

2009 novel by Andrew McGahan

- First edition cover
- Author: Andrew McGahan
- Language: English
- Genre: Science fiction
- Publisher: Allen & Unwin
- Publication date: October 2009
- Publication place: Australia
- Media type: Print (Paperback)
- Pages: 260 (first edition)
- ISBN: 978-1-74175-809-2

Wonders of a Godless World is a 2009 novel by Andrew McGahan. Described as "a kind of modern fable" that "verges on fantasy", it won the 2010 Aurealis Award for best science fiction novel.

It follows the story of an orphan girl who is working in the wards of the insane and incapable, but the inhabitants are thrown into turmoil after a series of strange murders following the arrival of a new patient.

== Background ==
Wonders of a Godless World was first published in Australia in October 2009 by Allen & Unwin in trade paperback format. It was released in the United Kingdom in May 2010 by Blue Door. Wonders of a Godless World won the 2010 Aurealis Award for best science fiction novel.

== Synopsis ==
Set on an unnamed island in the near present, it is told from the perspective of a simple young woman, an orphan, mute, reared in a mental hospital and an orderly there, who forms a bond with a mysterious coma patient, a man with telepathic powers who claims to be immortal...

Throughout the book the reader can never be sure that the mute orphan narrator is a reliable narrator. The possibility that her telepathic bond with the patient is in fact a figment of her imagination is always left open. So rather than science fiction, the book could instead be read as an insight into delusion.
