= K. A. Bedford =

Australian writer

- Born: Kenneth Adrian Bedford; 1963 (age 62–63); Fremantle, Western Australia, Australia
- Writing career
- Genre: Science fiction
- Notable awards: Aurealis Award; Science fiction division 2005 Eclipse; 2008 Time Machines Repaired While-U-Wait
- Website: www.edgewebsite.com

Kenneth Adrian Bedford, better known under the pseudonym of K. A. Bedford, is an Australian writer of science fiction.

== Biography ==
Bedford was born in Fremantle, Western Australia.

In 2003 Bedford's first novel, Orbital Burn, was released in Canada by Edge Science Fiction and Fantasy Publishing. He has since published five more novels. Eclipse and Time Machines Repaired While-U-Wait both won the Aurealis Award for Best Science Fiction Novel in 2005 and 2008 respectively, while Orbital Burn and Hydrogen Steel both received short-list nominations in the same category. Time Machines Repaired While-U-Wait was also a shortlist nominee for the 2008 Philip K. Dick Award. It was later released by an Australian publisher, Fremantle Press, in 2009 and featured a different cover. Paradox Resolution, the sequel to Time Machines Repaired While-U-Wait, was released in 2012 and continues the adventures of Aloysius "Spider" Webb. Bedford is well known for both his humor as well as the detective and mystery elements in his novels.

On writing, Bedford is quoted as saying, "I have instructed my wife that if I ever pronounce that I have mastered writing, she is to hit me hard with a squid. I now live in fear of the squid."

== Bibliography ==
- Orbital Burn (2003)
- Eclipse (2006)
- Hydrogen Steel (2007)
- Time Machines Repaired While-U-Wait (2008)
- Paradox Resolution (2012)
- Black Light (2015)
