= Loris Elaine Williams =

Australian archivist, Aboriginal activist (1949–2005)

- Australian Aboriginal Flag
- Born: 16 September 1949; Brisbane, Australia
- Died: 28 August 2005 (aged 55); Brisbane, Australia
- Education: University of Technology Sydney; Edith Cowan University
- Occupations: Archivist and activist
- Known for: Using archives to promote family, country and Indigenous identity

Loris Elaine Williams (1949–2005) was an Australian archivist and activist who supported the rights of Aboriginal and Torres Strait Islander people and used archives to help promote family, country and Indigenous identity. She became the first Aboriginal person from Queensland to earn professional archival qualifications and was only the second Aboriginal person to do that.

== Biography ==
Loris Williams was born on 16 September 1949 into a strong Aboriginal family in Brisbane. Her mother Agnes (née Bell) descended from the Birri Gubba people of the country's North Queensland region. Her father Cyril was from the Mununjali people who hailed from Beaudesert, south of Brisbane.

Williams first found work as a machinist and then joined the telephone company as an operator, but after 25 years there, at the age of 42, she lost her job when she was "made redundant." Her next path began at the University of Technology Sydney where she graduated with a major in Aboriginal Studies to satisfy a Bachelor of Education. In 1999 she enrolled in part-time study at Edith Cowan University in Perth, Western Australia, and completed her graduate diploma in archives and records in 2004.

In 1994, Williams started work as an assistant to researchers at the Indigenous Resources Unit of the State Library of Queensland and in 1998 she joined the Community and Personal Histories Section of the Queensland Department of Aboriginal and Torres Strait Islander Policy (DATSIP). She was known to spend part of her time at the Queensland State Archives helping Aboriginal and Torres Strait Islander clients trace their family and community through the archival records. Apart from a brief temporary assignment to the State Library of Queensland in 2002, she remained with the Community and Personal Histories Section for the remainder of her life. Sometimes the work was emotionally difficult as recounted at a conference.

"In 1999 she told the story of her own family’s journey through the archives at the Australian Society of Archivists’ (ASA) Brisbane Conference and spoke of the ’emotional rollercoaster’ that involved. She urged archivists to be aware of both the great happiness and the angry despair which Aboriginal people could experience as they traced their identity and she called on archivists to allocate the resources for indexing Indigenous records so that people could readily access their precious stories."

Loris Williams died at 55 on 28 August 2005, in Brisbane, Queensland.

== Legacy ==
- The State Library of Queensland has named a room in honour of Loris Williams.
- In 2006 the ASA held the first Loris Williams Memorial lecture to commemorate her life and work.
- The Loris Williams Memorial Fund has been established by the Australian Society of Archivists for new or existing Aboriginal and Torres Strait Islander students, professionals or researchers in archival and records management.

== Memberships ==
- She was a member of the Indigenous Advisory Committees of both the Queensland Museum and the State Library of Queensland.
- Loris Williams was an early member of the Aboriginal and Torres Strait Islander Library and Information Resource Network (ATSILIRN) and organized its 1999 conference in Brisbane. She served as the group's president in 2000.
