= Love & Virtue =

2021 novel by Diana Reid

- Author: Diana Reid
- Audio read by: Emma Leonard
- Language: English
- Subject: Sexual consent Campus sexual assault
- Genre: Bildungsroman
- Set in: Sydney, Australia
- Publisher: Ultimo Press
- Publication date: 29 September 2021
- Publication place: Australia
- Pages: 310 pp
- Awards: ABIA Liter. Fiction (2022); MUD Literary Prize (2022)
- ISBN: 9781761150111 (paperback AUS 1st ed.)
- OCLC: 1257318242
- Dewey Decimal: 823.92

Love & Virtue is a 2021 novel by the Australian author Diana Reid. Love & Virtue is Reid's debut novel and was first published by Ultimo Press on 29 September 2021. The book became a bestseller in Australia, selling over 50,000 copies in Australia since its release. It has received acclaim for its portrayal of campus sexual assault.

== Plot ==
The novel opens in a university bar, as two drunk students fumble their way through a dance. They stumble out into the night and up to the boy's room. As they start to have sex, the girl begins to throw up. Shortly after a stranger guides the girl back to her room.

Fairfax College is the only all-female residential college on campus. Eighteen-year-old Michaela arrives at Fairfax as a stranger from interstate on a scholarship. She encounters private school cliques and social circles.

Michaela's new neighbour is 20-year-old, Eve. A few years out of high school, she has already taken the opportunity to have a gap year and explore the world. Eve's quickly shocks the college community by masturbating on stage during a performance called What Woman Want at an inter-college drama night.

As the different colleges begin to intermingle, Michaela's social groups quickly expand as one drunken escapade leads into the next. One night her new friend Emily falls off a motorcycle, belonging to a college boy named Nick and breaks her leg. Another Michaela auditions for the St. Thomas Chapel Choir at the neighbouring college, and befriends a boy named Balthazar.

During an introductory philosophy lecture with Eve, Michaela is taken by the lecturer Professor Rosen. Throughout the novel, Michaela's feelings for Professor Rosen begin to develop and she attempts to initiate an intimate relationship with him. What starts as private tutoring sessions quick evolves into Michaela stealing a kiss at a faculty function. While Michaela builds a secret relationship with Rosen, her friendship with Eve falters as academic competition and changing social dynamics drive them apart.

During a college game of "Never have I ever", Michaela discovers that during orientation week she had sex with Nick while she was black out drunk. In the ensuing weeks, she grapples with confronting him about his memories of the event. Eve begins encouraging Michaela to report the event as sexual assault. The opportunity for clarity is taken away when Nick dies during a drug-fueled motorcycle accident.

After Eve and Michaela's friendship continues to deteriorate, Eve publishes an article about sexual assault on campus in the university newspaper. Eve presents Michaela's orientation week story as her own. The article draws widespread attention and quickly begins a discourse about the colleges. Eve becomes a media sensation and Michaela is at a loss for how to proceed.

When Balthazar sees Michaela at the beach with Professor Rosen, rumours about their relationship begin to spread. Rosen calls Eve to his office and tells her they should stop seeing each other.

Michaela confronts Eve about the article and the extent of her knowledge of her assault. Eve reveals that she was the stranger who helped Michaela back to her room. Nick's shouts were what initially attracted Eve's attention. When she went to investigate she found him shouting "Stupid Bitch" at Michaela, who was vomiting on his floor. Eve says that Nick was nowhere near as drunk as Michaela was.

During the epilogue, Michaela returns to the university years after graduating. The college buildings have since been transformed into function centres. She is attending a Q&A for Eve's new memoir about her time at the university. During the book signing, Eve doesn't recognise her until Michaela says her name for the dedication. Eve signs the paper and silently hands Michaela the book.

== Principal characters ==
- Michaela Burns, a teenage university student who moves to Sydney after receiving a residential college scholarship. Michaela struggles after she can't remember the details of a night where she got blackout drunk in the first week of college.
- Eve Herbet Shaw, an outspoken, extroverted college student who publishes Michaela's story as her own experience of sexual assault. Unlike Michaela, Eve grew up in the Sydney private school scene.
- Balthazar, a jocular college boy Michaela befriends through choir practice. Referred to as "Balth" by his friends, he is long familiar with most of the residents of the college scene.
- Professor Paul Rosen, a philosophy lecturer who begins an illicit relationship with Michaela.
- Jack "Sackers" Sackville, a boisterous college student who takes pleasure in taunting his peers.
- Nick, a college student who has sex with Michaela while she is extremely drunk during the first week of university.
- Emily Teo, Michaela's college friend who begins dating Nick.

== Major themes ==
=== Power and consent ===
Love & Virtue explores consent in both the social and sexual spheres as Michaela grapples with sexual assault and Eve's acquisition of her narrative. Part of Reid's motivation for writing the story was to contrast the multifaceted morality she experienced in university philosophy with the black-and-white deployment of morality she observed in broader society. Reid said she intended to use both "feminism" & "consent" to explore a "bigger theme: are you a good person, or do you just look like one?"

Elaine Channett writes that Reid utilises the story to investigate "ultimately who gets to tell a story and how; does every story need to be told? And if the story serves a greater purpose, does it matter who gets hurt, cut out or misrepresented in the process?"

=== Friendship and rivalry ===
Reid has noted her intent to explore "short-lived, far-reaching early-adult friendships", citing their appearances in other campus novels like The Secret History by Donna Tartt and Brideshead Revisited by Evelyn Waugh. While Michaela and Eve are initially friends, Reid says the "male-dominated academic environment" drives them apart. She believes this is a natural response "to an environment where space for women feels limited. Indeed, it is a classic symptom of internalised misogyny: to perceive other women as threats."

== Background ==
Before writing Love & Virtue, Reid had largely focused on writing for student theatre. After graduating from her Law degree at the University of Sydney, Reid had initially made plans to travel to the 2020 Edinburgh Festival Fringe. However, the onset of the COVID-19 pandemic resulted in her plans being cancelled. Reid began writing the book as a project during the first pandemic lockdowns.

Reid has stated that while the story is not autofiction, she allowed her university memories to texture the story. Reid said:

"The settings I took from real life, like the lecture theatre, or the formal or, like a boozy Thai dinner, but all of the events in it are completely made up. Michaela, the narrator, studies philosophy and has an affair with a professor. I can confirm I did study philosophy but never had an affair with a professor."

Love & Virtue is set in a fictional residential college. Reid attended a residential college for her first two years of university. In recent years, University of Sydney residential colleges have received media attention for several allegations of sexual misconduct. The 2018 Red Zone Report by End Rape on Campus Australia found "Approximately 68 college students will be raped or sexually assaulted in a university setting each week across Australia."

== Publication history ==
The book was published by Ultimo Press on 29 September 2021. An audiobook, voiced by Emma Leonard, was also released by Australian audiobook publisher Wavesound on the same day.

The book became a best-seller in Australia, selling over 50,000 copies since release.

== Reception ==
The book received generally positive reviews from critics. Writing for The Sydney Morning Herald, Declan Fry described the book as "a tale of our age’s crack cocaine: moral posturing", which "is a rare local example of the campus novel." Zoya Patel wrote in The Guardian that the book is "nauseatingly familiar" to reporting of "the ritual hazing and sexual assault of students on uni residential campuses."

Elaine Chennatt praised Reid's writing as "superb and compelling" and "walks the line of intellectual while ensuring the reader never feels isolated from the story." While Juliette Marchant celebrated how Reid "toys" with genre tropes to "build up readers’ expectations, developing the archetype only to slowly dismantle it as the text unfolds."

The Sydney Morning Herald named Reid one of their 2022 Best Young Australian Novelists. Reid also won the 2022 MUD Literary Prize for the best debut literary novel by an Australian writer.

The Australian Book Industry Awards awarded Love & Virtue their 2022 Literary Fiction Book of the Year.
