= The Old Lie =

2019 Australian science fiction novel by Claire G. Coleman

- First edition
- Author: Claire G. Coleman
- Language: English
- Genre: Science fiction
- Published: 2019 (Hachette Australia)
- Publication place: Australia
- Media type: Print (hardback)
- Pages: 356
- ISBN: 9780733640841
- OCLC: 1091587502

The Old Lie is a 2019 novel by Claire G. Coleman. It is about Earth joining an alien force, the Federation, to defend against another, the Conglomeration.

== Reception ==
A reviewer in Locus, although finding The Old Lie "an infuriating novel to read," concludes that "what ultimately shines through is Coleman’s passion, her fury and, most importantly, her keen sense of justice."

The Adelaide Review wrote that "Coleman interrogates our own recent past and present from stolen generations and Maralinga weapons testing to the age-old capacity for cold, bureaucratic inhumanity exhibited by aliens and humans alike."

The Old Lie has also been reviewed by The Canberra Times, The Saturday Paper, The Sydney Morning Herald and Australian Book Review.

== See also ==
- Terra Nullius
