= Children of Scarabaeus =

2011 novel by Sara Creasy

- First edition
- Author: Sara Creasy
- Cover artist: Christian McGrath
- Language: English
- Series: Scarabaeus
- Genre: Novel
- Publisher: Harper Voyager
- Publication date: 29 March 2011
- Publication place: Australia
- Media type: Print (paperback)
- Pages: 336
- ISBN: 978-0-06-193474-2
- OCLC: 276818881
- Preceded by: Song of Scarabaeus

Children of Scarabaeus is a 2011 science fiction novel with a touch of romance by Australian author Sara Creasy, published by Harper Voyager. Released on 29 March 2011, it is the second in a two-novel series, preceded by Song of Scarabaeus (released in 2010).

== Plot introduction ==
- Barely escaping the clutches of Scarabaeus, Edie and Finn try to make it to the Fringe worlds. Liv Natesa recaptures them and puts Edie back to work on project Ardra, an accelerated terraforming plan that Edie cannot see working on any scale. She's shocked to find Natesa's newest tool in her plot: children. When everything goes wrong, it seems the only way for everyone else to escape requires the ultimate sacrifice...

== Characters ==
- Edie Sha'nim – The best cypherteck in the galaxy, Edie was born half Talasai. This half of her genetics left her dependent on the neuroxin found only on Talas. She was trained by the Crib to seed worlds, but is not happy about the politics that go along with her station.
- Finn – A serf, Finn was liberated from his labor gang when Edie cut the tie to the implanted boundary chip in his head. Imprisoned shortly after the Reach Conflicts/Liberty War, Finn was a Saeth – his origins are not well known, and he keeps his secrets to himself.
- Liv Natesa – Edie's patron and Crib 'crat (bureaucrat). She plans to make her mark on the universe with Project Ardra.

== Awards ==
- Children of Scarabaeus was nominated for the Aurealis Award for best science fiction novel in 2011.
