= The Rook (miniseries) =

American drama miniseries (2019)

- Genre: Drama
- Based on: The Rook by Daniel O'Malley
- Written by: Al Blyth; Sam Holcroft; Francesca Gardiner; Karyn Usher; Lisa Zwerling
- Directed by: Kari Skogland; China Moo-Young; Sunu Gonera; Rebecca Johnson
- Starring: Emma Greenwell; Joely Richardson; Jon Fletcher; Ronan Raftery; Catherine Steadman; Adrian Lester; Olivia Munn
- Country of origin: United States
- Original language: English
- No. of episodes: 8

Production
- Executive producers: Kari Skogland; Karyn Usher; Lisa Zwerling; Stephen Garrett
- Producer: Steve Clark-Hall
- Production location: London
- Production companies: Lionsgate; Liberty Global; Character 7; Carpool Entertainment

Original release
- Network: Starz
- Release: June 30 – August 18, 2019

The Rook is an American television series, loosely based on the novel of the same name by Daniel O'Malley, and originally executive produced by Stephenie Meyer. It was ordered direct-to-series at Starz in July 2017. Meyer left the series due to creative differences as the first and second episodes were being filmed. It premiered on June 30, 2019, in the United States on Starz and on July 1, 2019, in the United Kingdom on the Virgin TV Ultra HD channel. On March 4, 2020, Starz confirmed that they had decided not to continue it beyond the original eight episode miniseries.

== Premise ==
Myfanwy Thomas finds herself at Millennium Bridge in London surrounded by dead bodies with no memory of how she came to be there. She soon discovers that she is an agent with Extreme Variant Abilities (EVA—both an acronym for the attributes and a collective three letter name for similar individuals) in a British secret service called the Checquy.

== Cast ==
=== Main ===
- Emma Greenwell as Myfanwy Thomas, a Rook in the inner court of the Checquy
- Joely Richardson as Linda Farrier, the King in the Checquy
- Jon Fletcher as Teddy and Alex Gestalt, identical quadruplets and two of the four bodies sharing one mind – collectively the Rook Gestalt
- Ronan Raftery as Robert Gestalt, a fraternal quadruplet of the Rook Gestalt
- Catherine Steadman as Eliza Gestalt, a fraternal quadruplet of the Rook Gestalt
- Adrian Lester as Conrad Grantchester, the Queen in the Checquy
- Olivia Munn as Monica Reed, an agent from the American Bureau of Variant Affairs (BVA), a Checquy sister agency

=== Recurring ===
- Ruth Madeley as Ingrid Woodhouse, a Pawn in the Checquy whose EVA brother was killed in a Vulture raid
- Shelley Conn as Danielle Wulff, a Chevalier in the Checquy, their PR expert
- Gina McKee as Jennifer Birch, the UK Home Secretary, responsible for the Checquy
- Barry Atsma as Peter Van Syoc
- Luke Roberts as Marcus Kevler
- Michael McElhatton as Lorik, a senior representative of the Lugate
- Tamsin Topolski as Bronwyn, Myfanwy's sister
- Aidan O'Callaghan as Alan, senior apex analyst in the Checguy
- James D'Arcy as Andrew Bristol, a former therapist for the Checquy
- Michael Karim as Nazim, an EVA with the ability to erase people's memory

== Episodes ==
No.	Title	Directed by	Written by	Original release date	U.S. viewers (millions)
1	"Chapter 1"	Kari Skogland	Al Blyth & Sam Holcroft	June 30, 2019	0.307
After waking up adjacent to the Millennium Bridge in Bankside, with no memory and surrounded by eight dead bodies, Myfanwy Thomas is thrown into the world of the Checquy, a paranormal secret service where she is a high-level operative known as a "Rook" and finds that no one can be trusted. Monica Reed, an EVA from the Checquy's American sister agency, the Bureau of Variant Affairs, arrives in London; she reveals that one of the dead Vultures (people who abduct EVAs) was missing American agent Marcus Kevler.
2	"Chapter 2"	Kari Skogland	Al Blyth & Sam Holcroft	July 7, 2019	0.288
Myfanwy ignores Linda Farrier, the "King" in the Checquy hierarchy and a seemingly personal protector of Myfanwy, and revisits the crime scene, adamant about recovering her memories. Monica finds a USB flash drive that Kevler hid at the flat he and the Vultures used, but hides it from the Checquy; it shows that he was trying to infiltrate the Lugate, an international cabal that buys and sells abducted EVAs. One of the dead Vultures revives and escapes the Checquy coroner's facility.
3	"Chapter 3"	China Moo-Young	Francesca Gardiner	July 14, 2019	0.228
Peter Van Syoc, the revived (his EVA power) Vulture, pursues Myfanwy, but is captured by the Gestalt(s). Farrier searches for a public scapegoat for the Bankside murders and has Home Secretary Birch pin it on Van Syoc, cast as the leader of a suicide cult. Monica, still withholding from the others, tricks Checquy Pawn Ingrid Woodhouse into providing logistics for her to go undercover at an EVA auction, attending under Kevler's account; when an EVA who causes amnesia is auctioned for £50 million, Monica is surprised to learn that she (Kevler's account) was the seller. Myfanwy finds a clue in her medical records that leads her to a remote field near Milton Keynes that once held Glengrove House – a Checquy training facility for young EVAs.
4	"Chapter 4"	Sunu Gonera	Al Blyth & Sam Holcroft	July 21, 2019	0.220
Monica follows the van transporting the auctioned amnesia-inducing EVA, but the drivers give him some water, allowing him to wipe their memories. CCTV shows Monica there moments after the EVA escapes, angering the Checquy for her obvious withholding of information. The equally devious Myfanwy uses Ingrid to access archived records; Myfanwy finds her way to Brighton and Andrew Bristol, her psychiatrist at Glengrove. He reveals that strong emotion made her barely functional EV Ability suddenly flare, burning Glengrove to the ground, with some people killed. This triggers her to remember their former inappropriate relationship, which she passionately re-instigates. She is angered to learn that Farrier apparently asked Bristol to acquiesce to Myfanwy's puppy love at Glengrove; she immediately returns to London. Farrier talks to a mysterious female prisoner, revealing that the prisoner had failed to trade the escaped EVA, named Nazim, for someone that Farrier had. Conrad Grantchester, the Checquy Queen, finds a hidden safety deposit box key at Myfanwy's; the box contains pre-amnesia Myfanwy's cash, fake passports and notes to her post-amnesia self for starting a new life. Nazim knocks on Myfanwy's door, introducing himself as the one who caused her amnesia.
5	"Chapter 5"	China Moo-Young	Al Blyth & Sam Holcroft	July 28, 2019	0.216
Nazim tells Myfanwy that a kind man (Kevler) brought him to London to meet a kind woman named Bronwyn, who promised to help him. Farrier asks Myfanwy about her visit with Bristol, then corrects Bristol's explanation, revealing that she was incapable of stopping a hormone-crazed teenager who had finally – deservedly – found happiness. Birch, furious about Checquy's failure to catch Nazim, suspends Farrier, while acting King Grantchester cuts Monica out of the loop. Grantchester, using a phone from pre-amnesia Myfanwy's stash, learns she has been in contact with Lorik, a leader in the Lugate; Lorik reveals that Myfanwy hired him to help her flee. Myfanwy enlists Monica to help Nazim escape, arranging a meeting with Bronwyn; Monica deduces that Myfanwy was wiped by Nazim at the Bankside incident, but still agrees to help. Gestalt's suspicions of Myfanwy lead them to the meeting place, intending to capture all four players for questioning by Grantchester. At the meet, in quick succession: Bronwyn reveals she is Myfanwy's sister, looking to rescue her; two Gestalt capture Myfanwy and flee; two Gestalt are inches from capturing Bronwyn, Nazim and Monica, and; Farrier arrives, (relatively) harmlessly incapacitates everyone with her EV Ability, and helps Nazim.
6	"Chapter 6"	Sunu Gonera	Francesca Gardiner	August 4, 2019	0.157
Grantchester interrogates Myfanwy, learning that she lost her memories at Bankside, that her pre-amnesia self arranged a way for her to flee to a life of peace, but hoped that she would stay in Checquy and "fight for the answers that we deserve". Myfanwy tells him that she believes Farrier is responsible for Bankside; he releases Myfanwy back to work. Farrier meets with Birch, who agrees to reinstate her and have her bring Nazim in as a critically valuable asset to squash future leaks regarding the Checquy's existence; after learning Myfanwy's accusation, Birch instead imprisons Farrier. Gestalt is heartbroken that Myfanwy was aware enough to blend in and search for clues, but was blind to the fact she could have trusted Gestalt. Monica is equally heartbroken by Kevler's betrayal, realizing he was in a relationship with Bronwyn for years, working as part of a resistance against any government's EVA operations. Myfanwy meets Bronwyn at their childhood home; Bronwyn explains the depth of Checquy's subterfuge in stealing young EVAs and using cult-like techniques to indoctrinate them. Some of Myfanwy's memories return, and she happily goes to Gestalt.
7	"Prologue"	Rebecca Johnson	Al Blyth & Sam Holcroft	August 11, 2019	0.190
Farrier, in Checquy detention, recounts to Myfanwy the events leading to Bankside… Birch tells Farrier that she might disband Checquy before its inevitable reveal causes political fallout. Myfanwy is vetting a new EVA whose proven power sees events up to one month in the future. The EVA cryptically explains what will happen to Myfanwy at Bankside. When Farrier dismisses the EVA as an everyday psychic, Myfanwy becomes disillusioned and plans her escape, paying Lorik for assistance. When Gestalt catches Bronwyn monitoring Myfanwy's arrivals at Checquy headquarters, Farrier tells her to leave her sister alone. Bronwyn contacts Kevler and suggests they trade Nazim for Myfanwy; Farrier accepts the chance to give orphaned refugee Nazim a home, while giving Myfanwy a life. Kevler, Bronwyn and Nazim approach Myfanwy, who calls Farrier, who confirms the story; the two share a tearful goodbye. As Nazim begins to remove Myfanwy's memories of Checquy, Van Syoc and his Vultures attempt to kidnap her, causing the memory wipe to go too far. Myfanwy flees to Bankside, where…
8	"Chapter 8"	China Moo-Young	Karyn Usher & Lisa Zwerling	August 18, 2019	0.192
Myfanwy decides to flee the Checquy, with help from Bronwyn and the Resistance. Birch informs Grantchester the Checquy is to be dismantled, with EVAs distributed across military and security agencies. Monica, despondent about Kevler's deception, visits a happily thriving Nazim at Glengrove II, where he agrees to remove her memories of Kevler; moments after, she collapses. Grantchester releases Farrier, with full pension and lifetime security detail. She implores him to get into the mud and save the Checquy, as an important agency and a safe home for EVAs. As Myfanwy waits for the ferry to France, and Farrier is headed home, both are abducted by Lorik's Vultures and taken to the English countryside estate of a Russian diplomat, where they join other EVAs being auctioned off. After Myfanwy sells for £75 million, a Resistance member helps her escape. She contacts Grantchester, who ignores Birch's warning of a diplomatic incident, sending Gestalt to the estate. Myfanwy returns there as well, joins Gestalt in neutralizing guards and Vultures, and personally uses her EV ability to kill Lorik. Myfanwy, no longer a mild administrator, commits to Checquy; Farrier teams with Bronwyn; Grantchester, with vitriol, tells Birch the Checquy is not disbanding.

== Reception ==
=== Critical response ===
On Rotten Tomatoes, the series received an approval of 44%, and a 5.83/10 average rating from 16 reviews. The critics' consensus states, "Though it teases some appealingly pulpy puzzle pieces, The Rook's dour tone and convoluted machinations overshadow its intriguing premise." Metacritic, which uses a weighted average, assigned the series a score of 62 out of 100 based on 6 critics, indicating "generally favorable reviews".

== Production ==
Somerset House features as "Apex House", the Checquy headquarters overlooking the River Thames. The Port of Dover was used in the series when production filmed inside Cruise Terminal Two, outside quayside and along Cruise Terminal.
