= The Dark Imbalance =

2001 novel by Sean Williams

- The Dark Imbalance first edition cover.
- Author: Sean Williams; Shane Dix
- Cover artist: Bob Warner
- Language: English
- Series: Evergence
- Genre: Science fiction
- Publisher: Voyager
- Publication date: 28 February 2001
- Publication place: Australia
- Media type: Print (Paperback)
- Pages: 388 (first edition)
- ISBN: 978-0-7322-6837-4
- Preceded by: The Dying Light

The Dark Imbalance (also known as A Dark Imbalance in the United States) is a 2001 science fiction novel by Sean Williams and Shane Dix. It is the third novel in the Evergence series and is preceded by The Dying Light which was published in 2000. It follows the story of Morgan Roche who has been given the task to protect mankind from the cloned warriors.

== Background ==
The Dark Imbalance was first published in Australia on 28 February 2001 by Voyager in paperback format. In March and April 2001 it was released in the United States and United Kingdom respectively. The Dark Imbalance won the 2001 Aurealis Award for best science fiction novel.
