= Crash Deluxe =

2005 novel by Marianne de Pierres

- First edition
- Author: Marianne de Pierres
- Cover artist: Larry Rostant
- Language: English
- Genre: science fiction
- Publisher: Orbit Books
- Publication date: 2005
- Media type: Paperback
- Pages: 320
- ISBN: 1-84149-258-2
- Preceded by: Code Noir

Crash Deluxe is a 2005 cyberpunk novel by science fiction author Marianne de Pierres and is the third and final Parrish Plessis Novel. In 2005, it was nominated for the Aurealis Award for Best Science Fiction Novel.
