= Daniel O'Malley =

Australian science fiction writer

- Occupation: Novelist
- Writing career
- Period: 2012–present
- Genres: Fantasy, horror
- Notable work: The Rook
- Website: www.rookfiles.com

Daniel O'Malley is an Australian science fiction writer. He is known for his series of novels about the Checquy, a centuries-old British secret service that is populated with agents of supernatural Extreme Variant Abilities.

== Biography ==
O'Malley was born and raised in Canberra, Australia. He earned an undergraduate degree from Michigan State University and a master's degree in medieval history from Ohio State University. After university, he returned to Australia, where he worked for the Australian Transport Safety Bureau writing press releases and acting as a spokesman.

His first novel, The Rook, was released in 2012. It received that year's Aurealis Award for Best Science Fiction Novel. The Rook has also been made into a miniseries of the same name on the Starz network with Emma Greenwell in the role of Myfanwy Thomas, a person with supernatural Extreme Variant Abilities and an agent in the Checquy, a centuries-old British secret service.

== Publications ==
- The Rook (2012)
- Stiletto (2016)
- Blitz (2022)
- Royal Gambit (2025)
