= Song of Scarabaeus =

2010 novel by Sara Creasy

- Author: Sara Creasy
- Language: English
- Series: Scarabaeus
- Genre: Science fiction romance
- Publisher: Harper Voyager
- Publication date: 27 April 2010
- Publication place: United States
- Media type: Print (paperback)
- Pages: 368
- ISBN: 978-0-06-199136-3
- OCLC: 276818881
- Followed by: Children of Scarabaeus

Song of Scarabaeus is a 2010 science fiction novel with a touch of romance by Australian author Sara Creasy, published by Harper Voyager. Released on 27 April 2010, it is the first in a two-novel series, the second being Children of Scarabaeus (released in 2011).

== Plot introduction ==
- Edie Sha'nim is a cypherteck, and the best in the galaxy. It's what she's been trained to do: manipulate biocyph to terraform alien worlds, while the Crib – her employer – drains the Fringe populations dry. When a band of rovers kidnaps her, Edie cannot decide if it's a blessing or a curse. Until they leash her to her new bodyguard, Finn – a serf whose past is not clear to anyone. If she strays from his side, he dies; if she fails to cooperate, the rovers will kill them both. The deal worsens when Edie finds they're taking her to her one failure... a planet called Scarabaeus. The world itself has a few surprises in store for Edie.

== Characters ==
- Edie Sha'nim – The best cypherteck in the galaxy, Edie was born half Talasai. This half of her genetics left her dependent on the neuroxin found only on Talas. She was trained by the Crib to seed worlds, but is not happy about the politics that go along with her station.
- Finn – A serf, Finn was liberated from his labor gang when Edie cut the tie to the implanted boundary chip in his head. Imprisoned shortly after the Reach Conflicts/Liberty War, Finn was a Saeth – his origins are not well known, and he keeps his secrets to himself.

== Awards ==
- Song of Scarabaeus was nominated for the Philip K. Dick Award and the Aurealis Award for best science fiction novel in 2010.
