= Sharp Shooter (novel) =

2009 crime novel by Marianne Delacourt

- Author: Marianne Delacourt
- Language: English
- Series: Tara Sharp
- Genre: Crime novel
- Publisher: Arena
- Publication date: September 2009
- Publication place: Australia
- Media type: Print
- Awards: 2010 Davitt Award, Best Adult Novel, winner
- ISBN: 9781741759310
- Preceded by: -
- Followed by: Sharp Turn

Sharp Shooter is a 2009 crime novel by Australian author Marianne Delacourt. It was originally published in Australia by Arena.

It is the first installment in the author's Tara Sharp series of novels, followed by Sharp Turn (2010), Stage Fright (2012), and Sharp Edge (2017).

The novel was the winner of the Davitt Award for Best Adult Novel in 2010.

== Synopsis ==
Tara Sharp can see people's auras. After she graduates from Mr Hara's Paralanguage School she takes on a job for a high-flying lawyer, only to find that she has become involved in some underworld criminal activities.

== Critical reception ==
Reviewing the novel for Sisters in Crime, Tanya King and Ann Byrne commented that "Sharp Shooter is the first in a series, a welcome addition to the comedy caper crime heroines, especially when pulled off with such aplomb. Delacourt is a refreshing new voice in crime fiction, whose aura-reading PI makes her presence felt."

== Awards ==
- 2010 Davitt Award — Best Adult Crime Novel, winner

== Notes ==
- Dedication: To the real Smitty, with love. And to Nicci Whitehouse, my beloved sis.
- The author spoke to Fiona Purdon, of The Courier-Mail newspaper, about how she came to write the novel.

== See also ==
- 2009 in Australian literature
