= Kylie Chan =

Australian author

Kylie Chan is an Australian author, best known for The Dark Heavens trilogy, set in modern-day Hong Kong. The first novel in the trilogy, White Tiger, was published in July 2006, followed by Red Phoenix in January 2007. The last in the trilogy, Blue Dragon was released in August 2007. After this, she wrote two more trilogies with the same characters.

== Personal life and culture in works ==
In the introduction to White Tiger, Chan stated that one of her ancestors was Chinese and that growing up, her Asian identity was something hidden. She says her identity has shaped her writing, which emerges as a blend of Eastern and Western culture, food, ideas, and values coming together in harmony.

== Writing history ==
Drawing from the years Chan spent living in Hong Kong, and her careful research into Chinese myth and philosophy, the Dark Heavens trilogy introduces Emma Donahoe, who takes a job as nanny to the daughter of a wealthy businessman. Unaware at first that he is in reality a Chinese god, she is drawn into a world of martial arts and magic where gods and demons walk the streets.

On her publisher's website Kylie Chan explains how she came to write The Dark Heavens trilogy, saying that after she returned to live in Australia, she read her way through every fantasy title she could find. Basing her writing on the genres she enjoyed - romance, action and the supernatural, and adding her knowledge of, and research into Chinese mythology and Taoist philosophy she created the first in the series, White Tiger.

Two further trilogies in the same universe followed, starting in 2009. The first of these trilogies is the 'Journey to Wudang' trilogy, the third book of which was released in 2011. This trio of trilogies is notable for featuring Sun Wukong, the famous "Monkey King" from the classic novel Journey to the West, as a recurring character.

== Works ==
These are a collection of Kylie's novels and short stories.

=== Xuan Wu series ===
The Xuan Wu series is Kylie Chan's premiere fictional universe.

==== Dark Heavens ====
The Dark Heavens is the first trilogy Kylie wrote.

1. White Tiger (2006)
2. Red Phoenix (2007)
3. Blue Dragon (2007)

==== Journey To Wudang ====
This is a sequel to the Dark Heavens.

1. Earth to Hell (16/12/2009)
2. Hell to Heaven (1/8/2010)
3. Heaven to Wudang (24/5/2011)

==== Celestial Battle ====
This is a sequel to Journey to Wudang

1. Dark Serpent (01/05/2013)
2. Demon Child (01/06/2014 Au, 30/09/2014 elsewhere)
3. Black Jade (2016)

As part of their anniversary celebrations in 2010, Voyager have released White Tiger in a hardback edition. All other volumes are only available in paperback.

==== Short stories ====
- Small Shen (2012), a prequel to "The Dark Heavens" trilogy, following the character Gold.
- Child Support (2005), a story in the anthology The Devil In Brisbane
- Gravity Engine (2011), a story about Prince Michael.
- Black Scales, White Fur (2010), a story about the white tiger falling in love with a snake mother.
