= The Rook (novel) =

2012 novel by Daniel O'Malley

- First edition hardcover
- Author: Daniel O'Malley
- Audio read by: Susan Duerden
- Language: English
- Genre: Contemporary Fantasy
- Publisher: Hachette Book Group USA
- Publication date: 11 January 2012
- Publication place: United States
- Media type: Print (Hardback & e-book)
- Pages: 496 pp (first edition, hardback)
- ISBN: 978-0-316-09879-3 (first edition, hardback)
- Followed by: Stiletto

The Rook is the 2012 debut novel of Australian author Daniel O'Malley. It follows protagonist Myfanwy Thomas as she attempts to re-integrate into her life of administrating a clandestine government organization responsible for protecting the U.K. from supernatural threats. Following a mysteriously induced bout of amnesia, she works to uncover the identity of a traitor inside the organization while simultaneously keeping her amnesia a secret. The title of the book is a reference to Thomas's rank in her organization, the Checquy.

The sequel Stiletto was simultaneously released in the United States and United Kingdom on 14 June 2016 through Little, Brown and Company.

== Plot ==
The book follows a young woman in her thirties who wakes up in a park surrounded by bodies wearing latex gloves. She is unable to remember anything about herself or how she or the bodies got there, and her only clue is an envelope in her coat pocket that says "To You". Inside is a letter that tells her the body previously belonged to Myfanwy Thomas, who worked in a secret government organization and was targeted by an unknown assassin. The letter offers the young woman (who is thereafter identified in the book as Myfanwy, although she sees herself as a separate person, considering her 'original' self as Thomas) a choice of taking up the life of the woman before her and discovering the identity of the would-be killer, or setting out with a new identity.

Myfanwy chooses to take up Thomas's position to discover who wants her dead. She is left with a binder that outlines the organization known as the Checquy ("sheck-ay") which combats the supernatural and unnatural forces that threaten Great Britain. Many of the members possess supernatural powers; only the ones with such powers are allowed to hold any true positions of power. Myfanwy finds that her specific power is control over other people's bodies through touch, which her predecessor never truly fully explored. Thomas was a Rook, a lower member of the inner court of the Checquy, which allowed her to research the workings of the organization. Myfanwy uses the binder heavily throughout the book, especially when trying to figure out which people she can or cannot trust. She quickly discovers that while Thomas was exceedingly skilled at organization and management, she was very timid and shy when it came to interpersonal relationships.

After a few missteps, Myfanwy turns out to be skilled at her job. She also finds that she is able to do far more with her powers than Thomas was, implied to be the result of Thomas having developed psychological blocks on her powers due to the traumatic experiences that activated them. This catches the attention of other members of the Checquy, especially when Myfanwy uses them to dispatch a large patch of semi-sentient mold and a large cube of carnivorous flesh. She also discovers that many recent troubles are due to the Grafters, a group of Belgians who conducted intensive research into genetic and surgical modification and used that knowledge to create inhuman super-soldiers. In the 1600s, the Grafters attempted to conquer the Isle of Wight, but were repulsed by the Checquy in a bloody battle. Though they were subsequently seemingly destroyed, they became the stuff of nightmares among the Checquy.

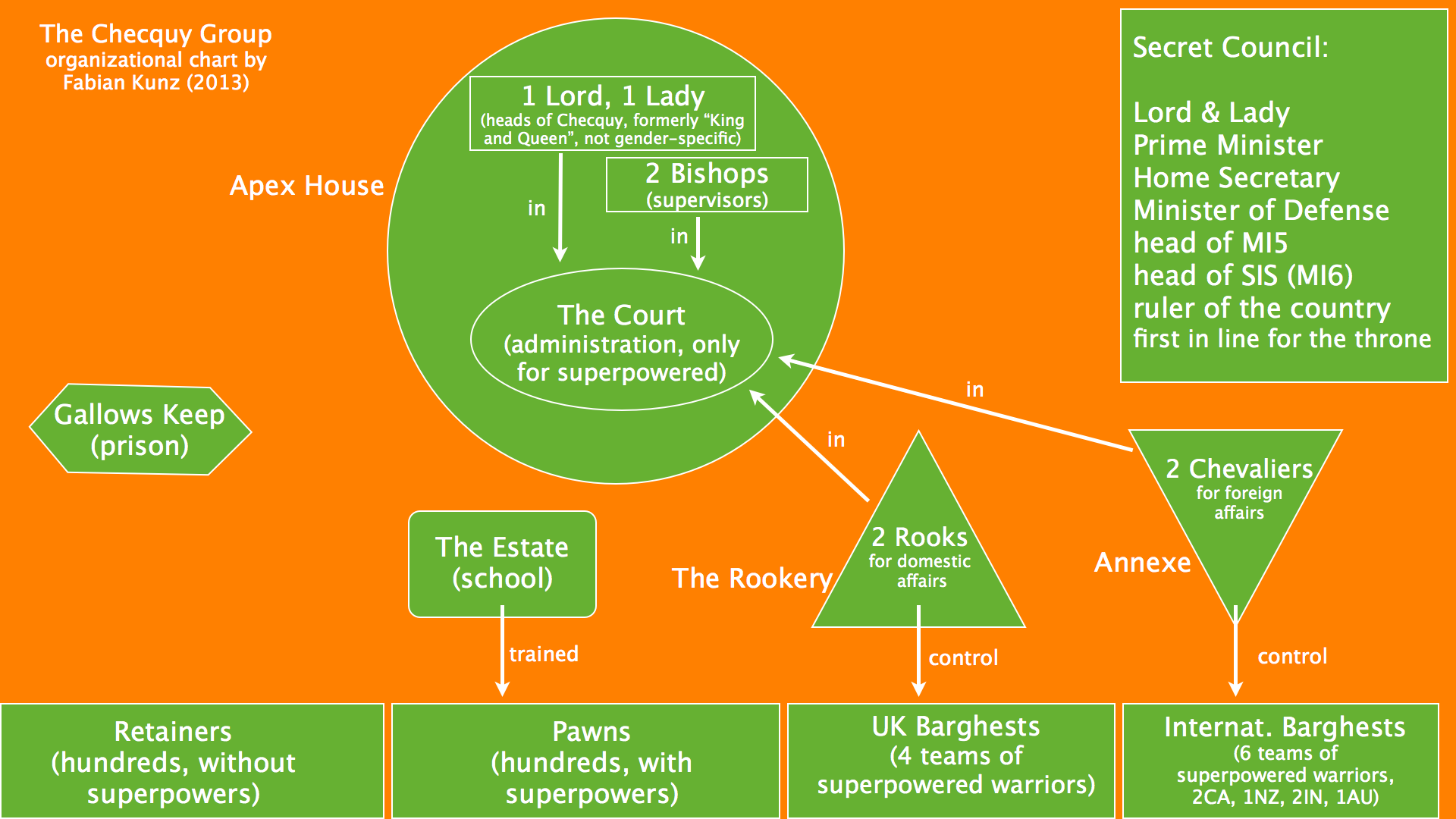
An organizational chart of The Rook's Checquy Group

Myfanwy soon finds that Rook Gestalt (one mind with four bodies, one of which is female) is working for the Grafters. While Gestalt is not the one who had tried to kill her, it (as Thomas had referred to Gestalt) views her with great disdain. She publicly accuses Gestalt of treason at a Checquy event, which ends in many of the Retainers, the non-supernatural members of the Checquy, turning on the powered members. Two of the Gestalt bodies are captured, with two escaping. This exacerbates Myfanwy's fears for herself, as well as for her sister Bronwyn, who managed to track Myfanwy down with the intent to rediscover her lost sibling, unaware of Myfanwy's true identity as a supernatural operative. Myfanwy initially suspects Bishop Alrich, a vampire, is the culprit, but eventually discovers that it is actually Bishop Grantchester, the man whom Thomas had replaced as Rook after he was promoted. Grantchester attempts to have Myfanwy's mind wiped again, but she fights back and successfully kills two of Gestalt's bodies in the process. Though Grantchester gets away, the remaining Grafter threats are killed, and the remaining Gestalt bodies are either taken captive or killed.

Myfanwy returns to her office to discover one of the founders of the Grafter group in her office, wanting to discuss a potential merger of his group with the Checquy. Despite her uncertainties regarding the threat the Grafters still pose to the Checquy, Myfanwy agrees to create a meeting with the remaining members of the inner court. She retains her position as Rook, but decides against telling anyone else about her memory loss.

== List of court characters ==
- LORD and LADY: Based in Apex House.
  - Lord – Sir Henry Wattleman – "Wattleman was instructed under this old system. Every year he was placed with a new mentor, who would train him in a variety of disciplines. The teacher would take him into his home and instruct him in everything from diplomacy to a pointed lack thereof." There seems to be a story about him killing Nazis while naked.
    - Power: Sir Henry Wattleman is noted to have an extended lifespan in the Rook. In Blitz the third novel of the series it is explained that he can become invisible, but that the power does not extend to his clothing, and that he has increased resilience and strength.
  - Lady – The Right Honorable Linda Viscountess Farrier
    - Power: can walk through and affect your dreams and talk to you in your dreams
- BISHOPS: Supervisors of the Checquy, aides to Lord and Lady, based at Apex House.
  - Bishop Conrad Grantchester – tall, slim in 50's, handsome, wavy black hair, blue-grey eyes – tendrils of black smoke coming off shoulders. The previous owner of bachelor furniture in residence of Rookery. Very rich financier. Womanizer. (Caroline Marsh – wife). Age 33 when power developed.
    - Power: Manufactures chemical compounds in his body, vents them in a mist. Different kinds of gas which includes: deadly toxin, tear-gas, and a gas with no effect, all of which emerge as a dark cloud that covers the area.
  - Bishop Alrich – tall, ivory skin dusted with light freckles, angular feature, androgynous, perfect. Blood red hair down to the small of his back, husky growly voice. Polished dress. Has been in Checquy for a long time.
    - Power: is a vampire.
- ROOKS: Domestic Operations, based at Rookery
  - Rook Myfanwy Thomas – Has lost her memory and is now a new person trying to figure out who betrayed the original Myfanwy Thomas.
    - Power: controls bodies of others with her mind.
  - Rook Gestalt – 1 person in 4 bodies, Alex, Teddy, Robert, Eliza. "Nine years before I was born, some poor woman had to give birth to four children in one sitting. Three boys and one girl. Two of the boys were identical. That's not the weirdest thing, however. The weirdest thing was that when all four pairs of eyes opened, only one mind was looking out from behind them. This was Gestalt. Gestalt is kind of disconcerting, because it/he/she/they is/are spread over four bodies. People try to avoid calling Gestalt anything but Gestalt because they get confused about the grammar. However, it's very tiresome to constantly write 'Gestalt' instead of using a pronoun. So, when I need a pronoun in this description, I'll refer to Gestalt as 'it.'"
    - Power: 1 person in 4 bodies.
- CHEVALIERS: Foreign Operations, based at Annexe
  - Chevalier Major Joshua Eckhart – Chain smoker, thinning blonde hair, hardened look. Tanned, does actual work. Military issue posture, alert eyes. Scars on hands. Recruited from the military. The children loved him when he went to the school as an adult. Was born to a nothing family in York with abusive parents who hated each other. Married with a child. Developed powers when on assignment in Jakarta at the age of 35.
    - Power: "Eckhart can manipulate metal. Under his touch, it becomes fluid, malleable; it assumes any shape he desires. It isn't magnetism. He can't attract or repel it. He sculpts it, gathering it up in great glistening handfuls and molding it into new shapes. With his tutors, Eckhart developed entirely new techniques of fighting. The weapons he carries change their form to suit the situation, and bullets are no longer an issue."
  - Chevalier Heretic Gubbins – Full head of thick, curly brown hair, no eyebrows, large walrus-style mustache, kind eyes.
    - Power: Very flexible contortionist.

== Reception ==
Before it was published, Lev Grossman listed the book as one of his "Seven Books I'm Looking Forward to in 2012." Critical reception for The Rook has been predominantly positive, with the book garnering positive reviews from Kirkus Reviews, Library Journal, and Publishers Weekly. MTV's Alex Zalben stated that the book was "a wholly refreshing, original piece of work that recalls many, many other previous fantasy universes while creating one of its own that will be worth revisiting again and again." Winner of the 2012 Aurealis Award for Best Science Fiction Novel.

== TV series ==
In July 2017, Starz ordered a TV series adaptation. In 2018, Emma Greenwell as Myfanwy Thomas, Joely Richardson as Linda Farrier, Olivia Munn as Monica Reed, Adrian Lester as Conrad Grantchester, the Gestalt siblings, Ronan Raftery as Robert Gestalt, Catherine Steadman as Eliza Gestalt, Jon Fletcher as Teddy and Alex Gestalt, Ruth Madeley as Ingrid Woodhouse, Shelley Conn as Danielle Wulff, Gina McKee as Jennifer Birch, Barry Atsma as Peter Van Syoc, Luke Roberts as Marcus Kevler, Michael McElhatton as Lorik, Tamsin Topolski as Bronwyn, Myfanwy's sister, Aidan O'Callaghan as Alan, James D'Arcy as Andrew Bristol, and Michael Karim as Nazim were cast.
