= Marianne de Pierres =

Australian author

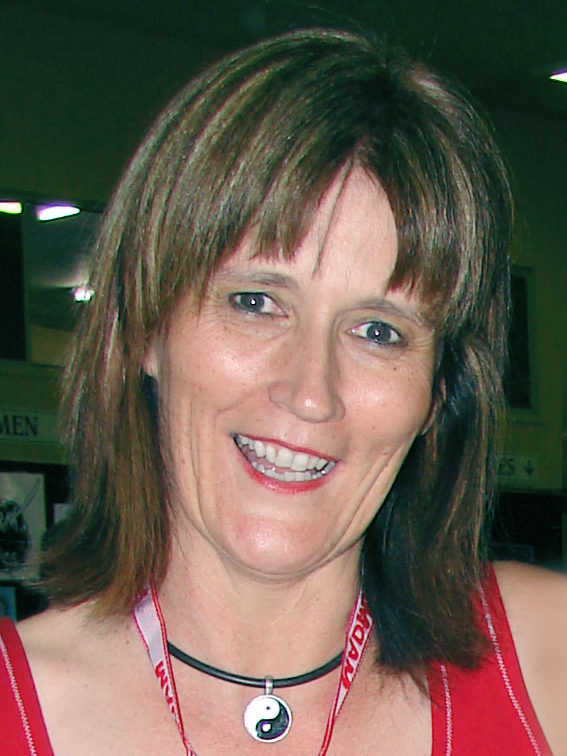
- Marianne de Pierres (photo by Amanda Greenslade, 2007)
- Born: 1961 (age 64–65); Western Australia
- Occupations: Novelist and academic
- Writing career
- Notable awards: 2010 Davitt Award, Best Adult Novel; 2014 Aurealis Award for Best Science Fiction Novel

Marianne de Pierres (born 1961) is an Australian science fiction author. Born in Western Australia, she finished her undergraduate studies at Curtin University in Perth and later studied a Postgraduate Certificate of Arts in Writing, Editing and Publishing at the University of Queensland. In 2019, she completed her PhD in Creative Writing at the University of Queensland

Throughout her writing career she has been actively involved in promoting Speculative Fiction in Australia and is the co-founder of the Vision Writers Group with Rowena Cory Daniells, and ROR – wRiters on the Rise, a critiquing group for professional writers. She was also involved in the early planning stage of Clarion South.

== Publications ==
The greater body of her work has seen publication in the UK and Australia. In 2004, her series of novels with the protagonist Parrish Plessis, a postapocalyptic bodyguard and bounty hunter, was published in the United Kingdom through Orbit Books and in 2005 in the United States through Roc Books. The novels in this series include Nylon Angel, Code Noir, and Crash Deluxe and have been adapted into a role-playing game. Her second series, Sentients of Orion comprises four books: Dark Space, Chaos Space, Mirror Space and Transformation Space, published in the United Kingdom through Orbit Books. Transformation Space won an Aurealis Award for Best SF novel in 2011.

In 2008 de Pierres began writing humorous crime under the pseudonym Marianne Delacourt. To date there are four novel novels in the Tara Sharp series: Sharp Shooter, Sharp Turn, Too Sharp and Sharp Edge. The first three novels were published by Allen and Unwin then later re-released by Twelfth Planet Press with the fourth book being released in 2017. The first novel, Sharp Shooter received a Davitt Award in 2010 for Best Crime novel by an Australian woman. The Tara Sharp series was optioned for film and TV by Hoodlum Productions, Brisbane.

Her young adult series, Night Creatures (Burn Bright, Angel Arias and Shine Light) was published by Random House, Australia. It featured a collaboration with Australian indie singer, Yunyu, who wrote songs to accompany the release of first two books.

In 2014, Angry Robot Books published her Peacemaker urban fantasy, crime, Western series.

=== Critical Work Based on de Pierres Fiction ===
Boshoff, Dorothea, 'Situated Knowledges – love in the time of patriarchy: lack of positive intimacy in Marianne de Pierres' The Sentients of Orion.' International Society for the Study of Gender and Love. Conference paper, 2020

Aliaga-Lavrijsen, J. Pregnancy, Childbirth and Nursing in Feminist Dystopia: Marianne de Pierres' Transformation Space (2010). Humanities 2020, 9, 58

Boshoff, Dorothea, 'Becoming Alien(ated): A case study examining intimacy and loneliness in selected works by Marianne de Pierres.' (2020)

Boshoff, Dorothea and Deidre Byrne. 'He Said, She Said: Fake News and MeToo in Marianne de Pierres' Sentients of Orion.' Messenger from the Stars Journal: On Science Fiction and Fantasy. No. 4 (2019): 88- 102. Guest Eds.: Danièle André & Cristophe Becker.

Turcotte, Gerry. 'The Caribbean Gothic Down Under: Caribbean Influences in Marianne de Pierres' Parrish Plessis Novels.' Caietele Echinox. 35. 237–243. 10.24193/cechinox.2018.35.15. (2018)

Boshoff, Dorothea. 'Crafting Positions: Representations of Intimacy and Gender in The Sentients of Orion.' PhD. University of South Africa, (2017)

Weaver, Roslyn. 'The End of Human: apocalypse, cyberpunk and the Parrish Plessis novels.' Apocalypse in Australian Film and Fiction: a critical study. Critical explorations in science fiction and fantasy; 28, McFarland Press, (2011)

Her complete bibliography is available from her website.

== Abridged Bibliography ==
=== Parrish Plessis Series ===
- Nylon Angel (2004)
- Code Noir (2004)
- Crash Deluxe (2005)

=== Sentients of Orion Series ===
- Dark Space (2007)
- Chaos Space (2008)
- Mirror Space (2009)
- Transformation Space (2010)

=== Night Creatures Series ===
- Burn Bright (2011)
- Angel Arias (2011)
- Shine Light (2012)

=== Peacemaker Series ===
- Peacemaker (2014)
- Mythmaker (2015)

=== Tara Sharp Series (as Marianne Delacourt) ===
- Sharp Shooter (2009)
- Sharp Turn (2010)
- Too Sharp (2011)
- Sharp Edge (2017)
- Razor Sharp (novella, 2022)

=== Story Collections ===
- Glitter Rose (2010)
  - Glimmer-by-dark
  - Moon Flowers at the Ritz
  - The Flag Game
  - Mama Ailon
  - In the Bookshadow

=== Children's Books ===
- Big Rad (2002)
- Serious Sas and Messy Magda (2013)
- Joon, Big Red, and the Unicorn (2025)

== Awards and nominations ==
Year	Award	Work	Category	Nomination
2003	Aurealis Award	In The Book shadow	Best Fantasy Short Story	Shortlist
2005	Aurealis Award	Nylon Angel	Best Science Fiction Novel	Shortlist
2006	Aurealis Award	Crash Deluxe	Best Science Fiction Novel	Shortlist
2007	Aurealis Award	Dark Space	Best Science Fiction Novel	Shortlist
2007	Ditmar Award	Dark Space	Best Novel	Shortlist
2008	Aurealis Award	Chaos Space	Best Science Fiction Novel	Shortlist
2010	Aurealis Award	Mirror Space	Best Science Fiction Novel	Shortlist
2010	Aurealis Award	Transformation Space	Best Science Fiction Novel	Winner
2012	Ditmar Award	Burn Bright	Best Novel	Shortlist
2014	Aurealis Award	Peacemaker	Best Science Fiction Novel	Winner
2014	Curtin University Alumni Award	Curtin University	Distinguished Australian Alumni	Recipient
2019	Truant Screenplay Competition	Stalking Daylight	Best Screenplay	Honourable Mention
2020	Adaptable – page to screen	Sharp Shooter	Best Pitch	Longlist

As Marianne Delacourt

Year	Award	Work	Category	Nomination
2009	Davitt Award	Sharp Shooter	Best Crime Novel	Winner

== External resources ==
- Marianne de Pierres' official website
