= Andrew McGahan =

Australian novelist (1966–2019)

- Born: 10 October 1966; Dalby, Queensland, Australia
- Died: 1 February 2019 (aged 52); Melbourne, Victoria, Australia
- Occupation: Novelist
- Writing career
- Language: English
- Years active: 1991–2016
- Notable work: The White Earth
- Notable awards: Miles Franklin Award 2005

Andrew McGahan (10 October 1966 – 1 February 2019) was an Australian novelist. His first novel Praise is considered to be part of the Australian literary genre of grunge lit. His novel The White Earth won the 2005 Miles Franklin Award.

== Early life and education ==
Born in Dalby, Queensland, McGahan was the ninth of ten children and grew up on a wheat farm. commenced an Arts degree at the University of Queensland, but dropped out halfway through, in 1985, to return to the family farm, and to commence his first novel – which was never published. He then spent the next few years working in a variety of jobs, until 1991, when he wrote his first published novel, Praise.

== Literary career ==
=== Novels ===
In 1991 McGahan won The Australian/Vogel Literary Award for unpublished novels with Praise – a semi-autobiographical account of a doomed, drug and alcohol-fuelled relationship. It became an Australian bestseller, and is often credited with launching the short-lived Grunge Lit or Dirty realism movement – terminology that McGahan himself (along with most of the writers to whom it was applied) rejected. In 1995 McGahan followed up with 1988, a prequel to Praise, partially based on time the author spent working at a lighthouse in the Northern Territory during Australia's bicentennial year.

In 2000, having by his own admission struggled to come up with a third novel, McGahan produced his first work of non-autobiographical fiction: the crime novel Last Drinks, a reflection upon the endemic political corruption in Queensland in the 1980s, and the aftermath of the famous Fitzgerald Inquiry. It won a Ned Kelly Award for crime writing. In 2004 McGahan published one of his most successful and respected novels – The White Earth, an epic and gothic tale set in a fictionalised version of the wheat district in which he had grown up. It became another bestseller, and won a raft of literary awards, in particular the Miles Franklin Award. In 2006 came Underground, an absurdist satire attacking the more extreme manifestations of the War on Terror in Australia. It received mixed reviews and caused conservative commentator Andrew Bolt to declare McGahan an "unhinged propagandist".

In 2009 he wrote Wonders of a Godless World, a work entirely without dialogue or proper nouns and delving into such topics as geology, weather and immortality and madness. It won the 2009 Aurealis Award for Science Fiction. In 2011 McGahan published The Coming of the Whirlpool, Book 1 of Ship Kings, a fantasy seafaring series. This was followed by Book 2, The Voyage of the Unquiet Ice in 2012, and Book 3, The War of the Four Isles in 2014. The fourth and final volume in the series, The Ocean of the Dead, was released in 2016.

McGahan's final novel, The Rich Man's House was published posthumously in September 2019. John Birmingham praised the book, saying 'a uniquely powerful voice roars out one last time, and then stillness and silence forever. This is Andrew's masterwork. His final gift to us.'

=== Other writing ===
==== Stage ====
In 1992, while serving a residency at the Queensland Theatre Company, McGahan wrote the play Bait, which was first performed by Renegade Theatre Company in Brisbane in 1995, directed by Shaun Charles, and which won a Matilda award that year. The play is set in a grim Social Security mailing room and concludes the "Gordon Trilogy" – finishing off the story of Gordon Buchanan that was begun in the novels Praise and 1988.

In 2009, McGahan co-wrote and co-directed with Shaun Charles a stage version of The White Earth for La Boite Theatre Company in Brisbane. Both stageplays, Bait and The White Earth, have been published by Playlab Press.

In 2006, McGahan's novel Last Drinks was performed at La Boite Theatre Company in an adaptation by Shaun Charles.

==== Screen ====
McGahan wrote the screenplay for the feature film adaptation of Praise, featuring Sacha Horler and Peter Fenton, directed by John Curran and released in 1999. The film won multiple awards, including an AFI Award to McGahan for the screenwriting.

== Personal life ==
McGahan lived in Melbourne, with his partner of many years, Liesje. He died of pancreatic cancer, aged 52, on 1 February 2019.

== Awards ==
- Praise – Australian/Vogel Award; Commonwealth Writers Prize South East Asia and South Pacific Region, First Novel.
- Praise Screenplay – AFI for Best Adapted Screenplay; Film Critics Circle of Australia Award for Best Adapted Screenplay; Queensland Premier's Award, Best Drama Script.
- Last Drinks – Ned Kelly Award for Crime Writing, Best First Novel.
- The White Earth – Miles Franklin Award, Commonwealth Writers Prize South east Asia and South pacific Region, Age Book of the Year, Courier Mail Book of the Year.
- Wonders of a Godless World – Aurealis Award, Best Science Fiction Novel.
- The Coming of the Whirlpool – Shortlisted for the 2012 Indie Awards (Children's category), CBCA Book of the Year and a finalist in the 2011 Aurealis Awards for Children's Fiction

== Bibliography ==
=== Novels ===
- Praise, Allen & Unwin, 1992, ISBN 978-1-86373-245-1
- 1988, Macmillan, 1998, ISBN 978-0-312-18032-4
- Last Drinks, Allen & Unwin, 2000, ISBN 978-1-86508-406-0
- The White Earth, Allen & Unwin, 2004, ISBN 978-1-74114-147-4
- Underground, Allen & Unwin, 2007, ISBN 978-1-74175-330-1
- Wonders of a Godless World, Allen & Unwin, 2009, ISBN 978-1-74175-809-2
- The Rich Man's House, Allen & Unwin, 2019, ISBN 978-1-76052-982-6

=== Young Adult ===
- The Coming of the Whirlpool (2011)
- The Voyage of the Unquiet Ice (2012)
- The War of the Four Isles (2014)
- The Ocean of the Dead (2016)

=== Drama ===
- Bait (1992)

=== Screenplay ===
- Praise (2000)

== See also ==
- Grunge lit
