= MUD Literary Prize =

Australian literary prize

The MUD Literary Prize is an Australian literary award awarded annually at Adelaide Writers' Week since 2018 to a debut literary novel. It is sponsored by a philanthropic organisation, the MUD Literary Club, which was founded in 2012.

== The organisation ==
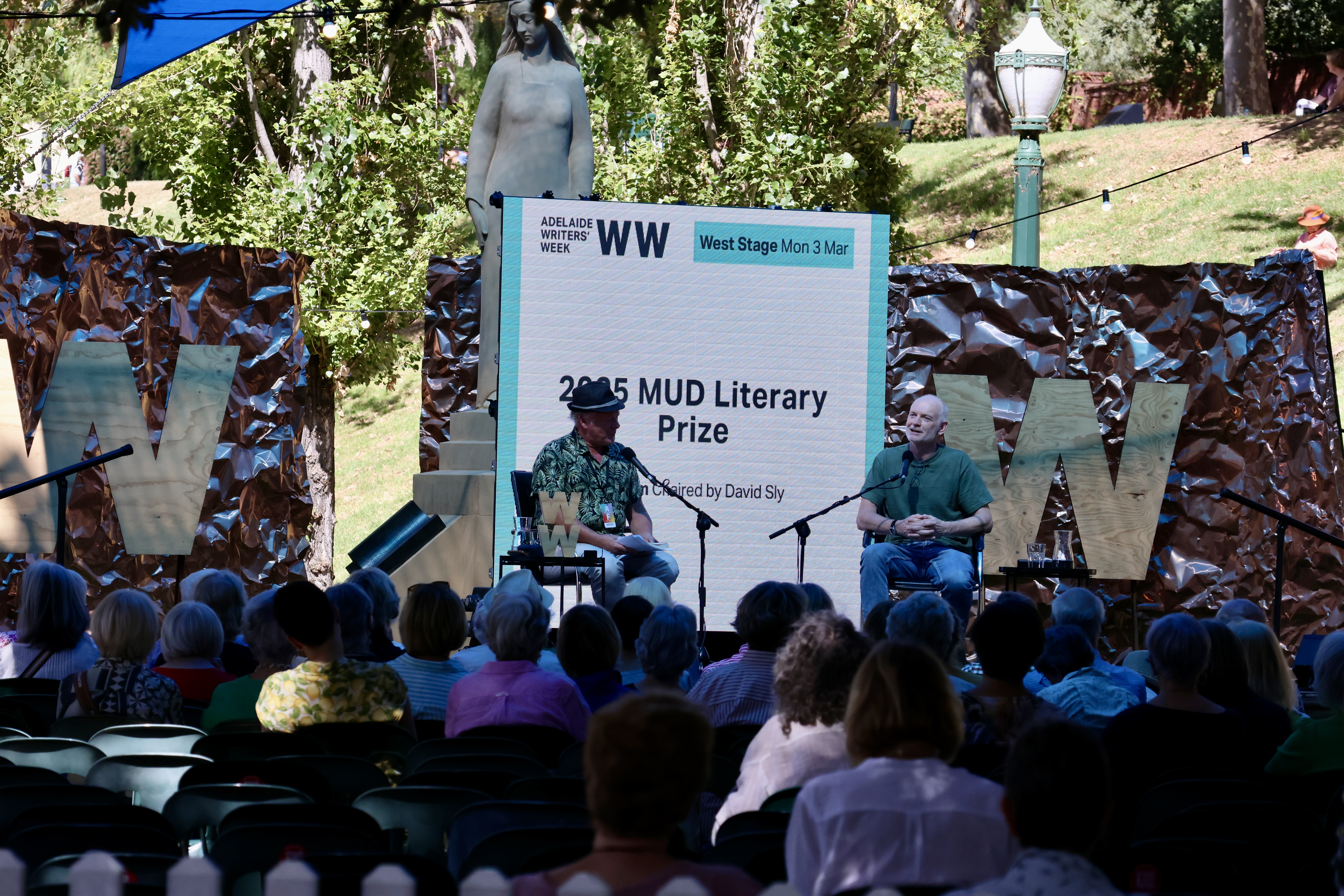
Cameron Stewart (right) at the 2025 Adelaide Writers' Week

The MUD Literary Club was set up by a group of philanthropists headed by businessman Tony Parkinson in 2012, its acronym arising from "Mates of Ubud", a group of people who banded together to fund the Ubud Writers & Readers Festival, which is held annually in Ubud, Bali, after a large corporate sponsor withdrew. A friend of Parkinson, Sue Tweddell, became an enthusiastic driver of the project. The new committee decided to also direct funds to Adelaide Writers' Week, an annual free event held in Adelaide, South Australia, and since then has sponsored the appearance of two authors at each festival. One of these is an established major Australian author, and the other an emerging talent.

It is the only philanthropic organisation supporting literature in Australia, and its collaboration with Writers' Week has been welcomed by the organisers. It continues to raise funds by hosting literary lunches featuring authors such as Richard Flanagan, Thomas Keneally, Hannah Kent, Kate Grenville, and many others, and also relies on several corporate sponsors as well as the subscriptions of its members, who pay A$500 person per year.

A session entitled "MUD Literary Club: The 10th Anniversary", chaired by David Sly, was scheduled for the 2022 edition of Writers' Week, featuring Thomas Keneally, Hannah Kent, and Christos Tsiolkas.

== The prize ==
The MUD Literary Prize is awarded at Adelaide Writers' Week in March each year, and is worth A$5,000 in cash as of 2021 (up from A$3,000 in 2020) and the prestige, exposure and recognition that comes with being presented at a major literary festival. In 2023, the prize was increased to A$10,000.

The inaugural prize was presented to Sarah Schmidt on March 5, 2018 at the Adelaide Writer's Week. Her work, a crime novel based on the notorious suspected murderer Lizzie Borden, reimagined the homicide of her parents and aftermath in 1892, and described the events from her and her sister's perspective.

Since then, a shortlist and winner have been announced every year through 2023.

== Prize winners and shortlisted works ==
| Year | Author | Work | Result | Ref |
|---|---|---|---|---|
| 2018 | Sarah Schmidt | See What I Have Done | Won | |
| 2018 | Claire G. Coleman | Terra Nullius | Shortlist | |
| 2018 | Rachel Leary | Bridget Crack | Shortlist | |
| 2019 | Trent Dalton | Boy Swallows Universe | Won | |
| 2019 | Peter Cochrane | Making of Martin Sparrow | Commended | |
| 2019 | Robbie Arnott | Flames | Shortlist | |
| 2019 | Michelle Johnston | Dustfall | Shortlist | |
| 2019 | Angela Meyer | A Superior Spectre | Shortlist | |
| 2020 | Sienna Brown | Master of My Fate | Won | |
| 2020 | Tabitha Bird | Lifetime of Impossible Days | Shortlist | |
| 2020 | Julie Keys | The Artist’s Portrait | Shortlist | |
| 2020 | Molly Murn | Heart of the Grass Tree | Shortlist | |
| 2020 | Kate Richards | Fusion | Shortlist | |
| 2021 | Pip Williams | The Dictionary of Lost Words | Won | |
| 2021 | Katherine Tamiko Arguile | The Things She Owned | Shortlist | |
| 2021 | Cath Moore | Metal Fish Falling Snow | Shortlist | |
| 2021 | Catherine Noske | The Salt Madonna | Shortlist | |
| 2021 | Andrew Pippos | Lucky’s | Shortlist | |
| 2021 | Nardi Simpson | Song of the Crocodile | Shortlist | |
| 2022 | Diana Reid | Love & Virtue | Won | |
| 2022 | Hannah Bent | When Things Are Alive They Hum | Shortlist | |
| 2022 | Jacqueline Bublitz | Before You Knew My Name | Shortlist | |
| 2022 | Campbell Mattinson | We Were Not Men | Shortlist | |
| 2023 | Tracey Lien | All That's Left Unsaid | Won | |
| 2023 | Mandy Beaumont | The Furies | Shortlist | |
| 2023 | Sharron Booth | The Silence of Water | Shortlist | |
| 2023 | Emily Brugman | The Islands | Shortlist | |
| 2023 | Jessica Stanley | A Great Hope | Shortlist | |
| 2024 | Kylie Needham | Girl in a Pink Dress | Won | |
| 2024 | Kim E. Anderson | The Prize | Shortlist | |
| 2024 | Madeleine Lucas | Thirst for Salt | Shortlist | |
| 2024 | Anna McGahan | Immaculate | Shortlist | |
| 2025 | Jumaana Abdu | Translations | Shortlist | |
| 2025 | Finegan Kruckemeyer | The End and Everything Before It | Shortlist | |
| 2025 | Raeden Richardson | The Degenerates | Shortlist | |
| 2025 | Cameron Stewart | Why Do Horses Run? | Won | |
2026
| 2026 | Dominic Amerena | I Want Everything | Won | |
| 2026 | Vijay Khurana | The Passenger Seat | Shortlist | |
| 2026 | Steve MinOn | First Name Second Name | Shortlist | |
| 2026 | Leonie Norrington, Djawundil Maymuru, Merrkiyawuy Ganambarr-Stubbs and Djawa Bururrwanga | A Piece of Red Cloth | Shortlist | |
