= Jane Abbott =

American writer (1881–1962)

- Born: July 10, 1881; Buffalo, New York, U.S
- Died: December 13, 1962 (aged 81); Buffalo, New York, U.S.
- Education: Cornell University
- Occupation: Author
- Spouse: Frank Addison Abbott

Jane Ludlow Drake Abbott (July 10, 1881 – December 13, 1962) was an American writer who published more than 35 books. She started writing children's books when her own children were small and later went on to write adult novels. Many of her books were written primarily for girls, but had broad appeal for the whole family.

== Biography ==
Jane Ludlow Drake was born on July 10, 1881, in Buffalo, New York, to Captain Marcus Motier Drake and his second wife, Mary A. Ludlow. Her family was involved in shipbuilding and sailing, and Jane spent much of her childhood on and near the Great Lakes.

She attended Cornell University from 1899 to 1902, working for two years as part of the editorial staff of the graduate newspaper.

On December 21, 1902, Jane married Frank Addison Abbott, a former Cornell student and lawyer from Buffalo who later served as District Attorney of Erie County (1906-1908). They had three children.

Jane Abbott began writing books for children, later writing fiction for adults. She published about twenty books for boys and girls, and about fifteen novels for adults. Many of her books were written primarily for girls, but had broad appeal, combining "fun, family life, adventure and mystery in just the right proportions". They were praised as being "natural", "good, wholesome books", "brimming with life, but clean in their conception and their language".

"I don't think my husband and children ever felt neglected," Mrs. Abbott has said. "I tried out on them everything I wrote, shared their interests, and took my writing time mostly from the time I did not spend on teas, bridge parties, women's clubs, department stores, and crowded streets."

== Main works ==
- Keineth, 1918
- Larkspur, 1919
- Highacres, 1920
- Happy House, 1920
- Aprilly, 1921
- Red-Robin, 1922
- Fidelis, 1923
- Minglestreams, 1923
- Laughing Last, 1924
- Juliet Is Twenty, 1926
- Heyday, 1928
- Beggarman, 1930
- Merridy Road, 1930
- Kitty Frew, 1931
- Bouquet Hill, 1931
- The Young Dalfreys, 1932
- Silver Fountain, 1932
- Miss Jolley's Family, 1933
- Dicket: A Story Of Friendships, 1933
- Fiddler's Coin, 1934
- Folly Farm, 1934
- Low Bridge, 1935
- Strangers In The House, 1935
- Benefit Street, 1936
- Angels May Weep, 1937
- A Row Of Starts, 1937
- Singing Shadows, 1938
- To Have, To Keep, 1939
- Clo, 1940
- Lorrie, 1941
- Yours For The Asking, 1943
- Mary Patten's Daughters, 1945
- The Outsiders, 1948
- River's Rim, 1950
- The Neighbors, 1952
- The Inheritors, 1953
- The Open Way, 1955
