= Australian Society of Archivists =

Professional body representing archivists in Australia

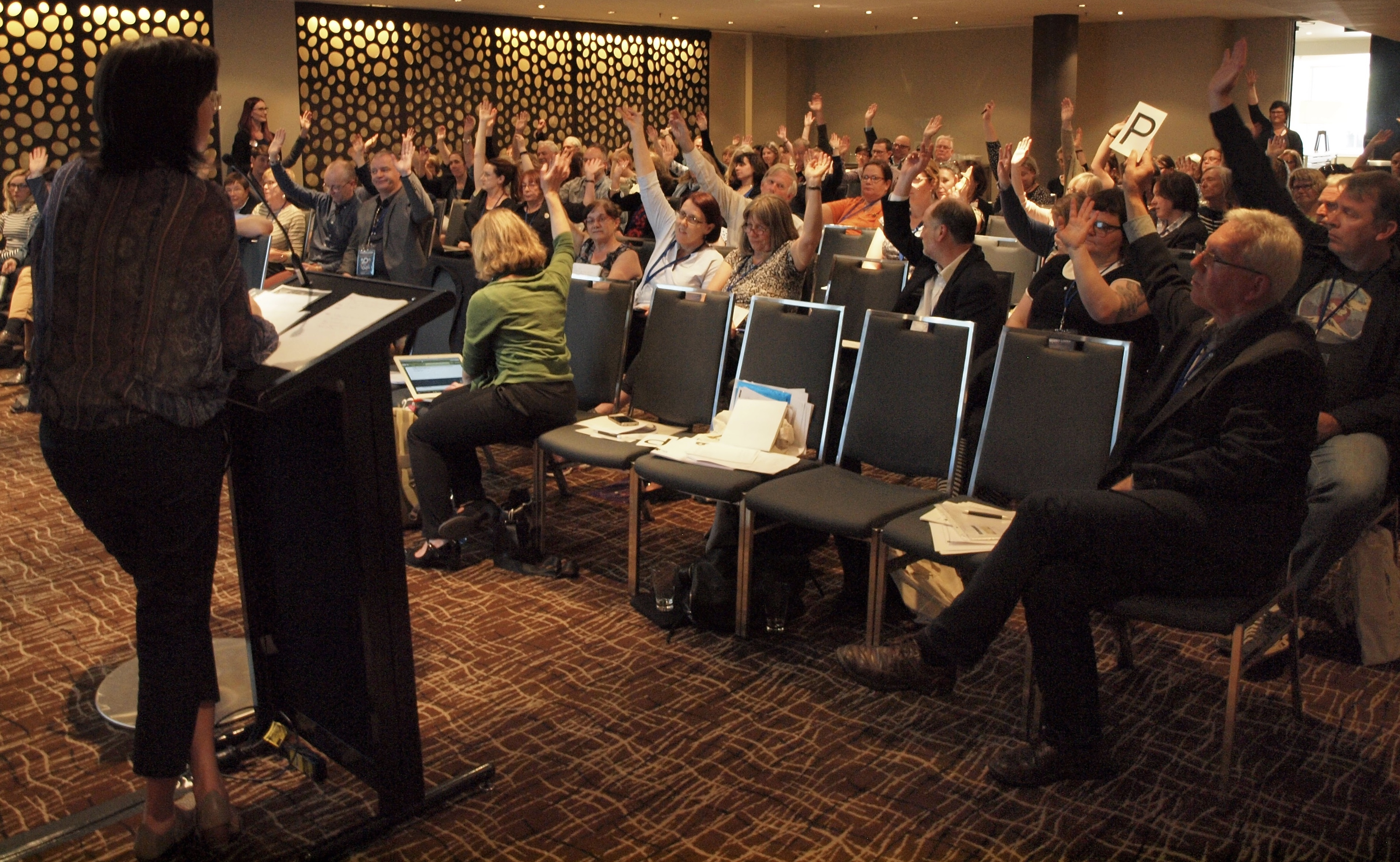
Members vote, at the society's 2016 Annual General Meeting

The Australian Society of Archivists is a professional organisation of archivists in Australia.

The Australian Library Association had an archives section between 1951 and 1973.

Significant persons in the starting of the society include Phyllis Mander-Jones, and Robert Sharman who became the editor of the journal Archives and Manuscripts

The inaugural meeting of the Society was held at the Australian National University in April 1975. The first biennial conference was held in 1977.

== Journal ==
The Society publishes a professional and scholarly journal called Archives and Manuscripts (three issues per year, currently published through Taylor & Francis). Previous editors have included:

- Phyllis Mander-Jones
- Alan Roy Horton
- HJ (Herbert James) Gibbney
- RC (Robert Charles) Sharman

The original title was: Archives and manuscripts : the journal / of the Archives Section of the Library Association of Australia. Sydney : the Association, 1962-1976.

In February 1976 it became The Journal of the Australian Society of Archivists.

== Conferences ==
Annual conferences of the society include the Loris Williams Memorial Lecture, honouring Loris Elaine Williams, and the Mander Jones Awards.

== Notable members ==
- Anne-Marie Schwirtlich the former Director-General of the National Library of Australia
- Loris Elaine Williams an Australian archivist and activist and first Aboriginal person from Queensland to earn professional archival qualifications

== Publications ==
- Bettington, Jackie; Eberhard, Kim; Loo, Rowena; Smith, Clive (2008), Keeping archives (3rd ed.), Australian Society of Archivists Inc, ISBN 978-0-9803352-4-8
