= Dark Space =

2007 novel by Marianne de Pierres

- First edition
- Author: Marianne de Pierres
- Language: English
- Series: Sentients of Orion
- Genre: Science fiction
- Publisher: Hachette Australia
- Publication date: 2007
- Media type: Paperback
- Pages: 432
- ISBN: 9781841494289
- Followed by: Chaos Space

Dark Space is a 2007 space opera novel by science fiction author Marianne de Pierres. It is the first novel in the author's The Sentients of Orion series.

It was a finalist for best science fiction novel in the 2007 Aurealis Awards.

== Reviews ==
Ion Newcombe, reviewing the novel for Antipodean SF noted: "Dark Space is well-paced, precisely written (although I did wince at a couple of dangling participles), and I'm now hanging out to read the next two books."

In The Sunday Age Lucy Sussex found that "De Pierres does good, strong heroines, and also action sequences. Add a mining planet that reads like Pilbara gone feral, and disgusting invading aliens, and we have here the first in a series of novels. It mingles science with Machiavellian intrigue, vivid scene-setting with child care."
