= Nylon Angel =

2004 novel by Marianne de Pierres

- First edition
- Author: Marianne de Pierres
- Cover artist: Larry Rostant
- Language: English
- Genre: Science Fiction
- Publisher: Orbit Books
- Publication date: 2004
- Media type: Paperback
- Pages: 320
- ISBN: 0-451-46037-5
- Followed by: Code Noir

Nylon Angel is a postcyberpunk novel by science fiction author Marianne de Pierres

== Plot summary ==
The story is set in post-apocalyptic Australia, around a city called the Tert. There, a bounty hunter/bodyguard named Parrish Plessis has ended up working for a ganglord called Jamon Mondo. She wants out, and her answer arrives in the form of two men wanted in connection with the killing of a journalist called Razz Retribution (In this world, the army, churches and the government have given up on the world, so it is now ruled by the media).

The story is divided between the Tert, a rundown slum reminiscent of Mega-City One, and Viva City (a pun on the word vivacity), a walled suburb some forty kilometres up the coast.

== Reception ==
Cameron Woodhead of The Age called the book "a trashy, imaginative piece of cyberpunk". He said, "The novel has its problems but there is enough fashion-conscious brutality to distract you from them. A compelling blend of Mad Max and James Cameron's Dark Angel." Writing for The Canberra Times, Maxine McArthur said, "It's a strong narrative told by female bodyguard/adventurer Parrish Plessis. Be prepared for breathless action, a cyberpunk flavour, a little voodoo, and (possibly) a science-fiction core to the plot."

In a largely positive review, The Sydney Morning Herald critic Tim Cadman stated, "The plot is a bit slow to get going and concentration on the protagonist makes the other characters a little one-dimensional, but this is fortunately counterbalanced by vivid descriptions of life in the slums that have an almost cinematic quality. Occasional touches of Australiana add local colour to the underlying themes of urban decay and media exploitation, and it is this combination that makes the book an exciting and adrenalin-pumping read."

== Adaptations ==
A role playing game based on the series has been created by White Mice Worldbuilding.
