= Joel Shepherd =

Australian science fiction author (born 1974)

Joel Shepherd (born 1974 in Adelaide, South Australia) is an Australian science fiction author. He moved to Perth, Western Australia with his family when he was seven, where he later studied film and television arts at Curtin University. He now lives in Adelaide.

He is the son of Kate Shepherd, owner/operator of Austral Ed, a small Australian educational book supplier to Asia. He helps his mother in this business and has traveled widely as a result.

His first unpublished manuscript was shortlisted for the George Turner Prize in 1998 and the manuscript for Crossover was shortlisted in 1999.

His first novel Crossover was shortlisted for the science fiction division of the 2001 Aurealis Awards, that recognise the achievements of Australian science fiction, fantasy and horror writers.

His first series follows the adventures of Cassandra Kresnov, an artificially created super-soldier who becomes disillusioned with the policies and actions of her country, the League. She defects to the city of Tanusha, on the planet of Callay in the Federation, the League's rival nation, and attempts to live as a civilian software expert.

His second series follows the adventures of Sasha, a rebellious Lenayin princess with a talent for sword-fighting who gets embroiled in a widespread religious crusade spanning most of the region.

His third series follows the crew of a battle carrier spaceship called Phoenix and falls into the space opera genre. It is self-published.

== Bibliography ==
=== Cassandra Kresnov ===
- Crossover (2001) ISBN 0-7322-6799-4
- Breakaway (2003) ISBN 0-7322-7596-2
- Killswitch (2004) ISBN 0-7322-7597-0
- 23 Years on Fire (2013) ISBN 1-6161-4809-8
- Operation Shield (2014) ISBN 978-1616148959
- Originator (2015) ISBN 978-1616149932

=== A Trial of Blood and Steel ===
- Sasha (2007), ISBN 0-7336-2141-4
- Petrodor (2008), ISBN 0-7336-2255-0
- Tracato (2009), ISBN 0-7336-2418-9
- Haven (2010), ISBN 0-7336-2420-0

=== The Spiral Wars ===
- "Renegade" (2015), ASIN B0138YJ3WA
- "Drysine Legacy" (2015), ASIN B019H7KFEW
- "Kantovan Vault" (2016), ASIN B01LWZJOMJ
- "Defiance" (2017), ASIN B073PCBKJ2
- "Croma Venture" (2018), ISBN 1727769279
- "Rando Splicer" (2019), ASIN B07X8C4TG8
- "Qalea Drop" (2020), ASIN B08ML8FBS4
- "Ceephay Queen" (2022), ASIN B09WV5XP2Q
- "Homecoming" (2024), ASIN B0CV3DR43P
- "Precursor" (2025), ASIN B0D49DLCH1

=== The Dead Realm ===
- Angelina (May 2023), ASIN B0C5HS1D3L
- Evil Empire (Dec 2023), ASIN B0CJ9KM7JT
