= S. K. Dunstall =

Pen name of science fiction writers

Sherylyn and Karen Dunstall
- Born: Australia
- Occupation: Novelist
- Writing career
- Pen name: S. K. Dunstall
- Genre: Science fiction
- Website: www.skdunstall.com

S. K. Dunstall is the pen name used by Australian sisters Sherylyn and Karen Dunstall. They write science fiction and space opera. Karen mostly manages the website and blog while Sherylyn the social media.

== Bibliography ==
=== Linesman series ===
- Linesman (2015, Ace Books: ISBN 978-0425279526)
- Alliance (2016, Ace Books: ISBN 978-0425279533)
- Confluence (2016, Ace Books: ISBN 978-0425279540)

=== Stars Uncharted series ===
- Stars Uncharted (2018, Ace Books: ISBN 978-0399587627)
- Stars Beyond (2020, Ace Books: ISBN 978-0399587641)
