= Sean Williams (author) =

Australian writer

- Williams in 2026
- Born: 23 May 1967 (age 59); Whyalla, Australia
- Occupation: Author
- Writing career
- Genres: Science fiction, Fantasy, Horror, Crime
- Website: www.seanwilliams.com

Sean Llewellyn Williams (born 23 May 1967) is an Australian author of science fiction who lives in Adelaide, South Australia. Several of his books have been New York Times best-sellers.

== Early life and education ==
Williams was born in Whyalla, South Australia on 23 May 1967.

He studied sciences and music at Pulteney Grammar School and matriculated third in his year (1984), topping the state for Musical composition. That same year, he won the Young Composer's Award for a theme and three variations for string quartet with flute, oboe and trumpet soloists called "Release of Anger".

He then went to the Adelaide University and studied a Bachelor of Economics and wrote for the student newspaper On Dit. He completed a Master of Arts in Creative Writing at the Adelaide University in 2005. In 2013, he was awarded a PhD from the same institution.

== Writing career ==
He is the author of over 140 published short stories and 60 books, including Twinmaker and (with Garth Nix) the Troubletwisters series. He has co-written three books in the Star Wars: New Jedi Order series. His novelisation of Star Wars: The Force Unleashed debuted at #1 on the "New York Times" bestseller list.

== Other roles ==
Williams was Chair of the SA Writers' Centre from 2001 to 2003, and is one of only three lifetime members of that institution. Williams has also tutored for the Clarion South Workshop, was a previous winner of the Writers of the Future contest, and remains a judge for the same.

In 2017, Williams visited Casey Station on an Arts Fellowship awarded by the Australian Antarctic Division.

Since 2019, Williams has taught Creative Writing at Flinders University.

Under the pseudonym, theadelaidean, Williams makes ambient and experimental music released mainly through Projekt Records. In July 2024, Projekt released the double CD Parallels, his first collaboration with Steve Roach. Some of Williams' music has appeared in film and on the stage, such as for the award-nominated short film "Life Savings" (which screened at the St Kilda Short Film Festival in 2024) and the score for the 2023 South Australian Ruby Awards-nominated multimedia work Bárbaros. A presentation of his album Hyperaurea appeared in the 2024 Adelaide Fringe.

== Awards ==
Williams is a multiple recipient of both the Ditmar and Aurealis Awards.

== Novels ==
=== Evergence (with Shane Dix) ===
- The Prodigal Sun (1999)
- The Dying Light (2000) - Winner, Best Long Fiction, 2001 Ditmar Award
- The Dark Imbalance (2001) - Winner, Best Science Fiction Novel, 2001 Aurealis Award

=== The Books of the Change ===
- The Stone Mage & the Sea (2001)
- The Sky Warden & the Sun (2002)
- The Storm Weaver & the Sand (2002) - Winner, Best Fantasy Novel, 2002 Aurealis Award

=== Orphans (with Shane Dix) ===
- Echoes of Earth (2002) - Winner, Best Australian Novel, 2002 Ditmar Award
- Orphans of Earth (2003)
- Heirs of Earth (2004)

=== Star Wars: New Jedi Order (with Shane Dix) ===
- Force Heretic I: Remnant (2003)
- Force Heretic II: Refugee (2003)
- Force Heretic III: Reunion (2003)

=== Star Wars ===
- The Force Unleashed (2008)
- Star Wars: The Old Republic: Fatal Alliance (2010)
- The Force Unleashed II (2010)

=== The Books of the Cataclysm ===
- The Crooked Letter (2004) - Winner, Best Novel, 2004 Ditmar Award & Winner, Best Fantasy Novel, 2004 Aurealis Award
- The Blood Debt (2005)
- The Hanging Mountains (2005)
- The Devoured Earth (2006)

=== Geodesica (with Shane Dix) ===
- Ascent (2005) - Winner, Best Novel, 2005 Ditmar Award
- Descent (2006)

=== The Broken Land ===
- The Changeling (2008) - Shortlisted for Best Young Adult Novel, and Best Children's Novel, in the 2008 Aurealis Award.
- The Dust Devils (2008) - Shortlisted for the Best Children's Novel, in the 2008 Aurealis Award.
- The Scarecrow (2009)

=== Astropolis ===
- Saturn Returns (2007) - Winner, Best Novel, 2008 Ditmar Award & Nominee, 2008, Philip K. Dick Award

- Cenotaxis (2007) - book 1.5, novella

- Earth Ascendant (2008)
- The Grand Conjunction (2009)

=== The Fixers ===
- Castle of the Zombies (2010)
- Planet of the Cyborgs (2010)
- Last of the Vampires (2010)
- Invasion of the Weird (2010)

=== Troubletwisters series (with Garth Nix) ===
- The Magic (2011) (aka Troubletwisters in Australia)
- The Monster (2012)
- The Mystery (2013) (aka Mystery of the Golden Card in Australia)
- The Missing (2014) (aka Missing, Presumed Evil in Australia and the UK)

=== Have Sword, Will Travel series (with Garth Nix) ===
- Have Sword, Will Travel (2017)
- Let Sleeping Dragons Lie (2018)

=== Twinmaker Series ===
- Twinmaker: Jump (2013) (aka Twinmaker outside of Australia)
- Twinmaker: Crash (2014) (aka Crashland outside of Australia)
- Twinmaker: Fall (2015) (aka Hollowgirl outside of Australia)

=== Others ===
- The Unknown Soldier: Book One of the Cogal (1995) - (with Shane Dix) Re-imagined and rewritten as The Prodigal Sun
- Metal Fatigue (1996) - Winner, Best Science Fiction Novel, 1996 Aurealis Award
- The Resurrected Man (1998) - Winner, Best Long Fiction, 1999 Ditmar Award
- Spirit Animals Book 3: Blood Ties (2014) (with Garth Nix)
- Impossible Music (2019)
- Her Perilous Mansion (2021) - Shortlisted, 2021 Patricia Wrightson Prize for Children’s Literature
- Honour Among Ghosts (2022) - Shortlisted for Best Fantasy Children's Novel, in the 2023 Aurealis Award

== Collections ==
- Doorways to Eternity (MirrorDanse Books, 1994)
- A View Before Dying (Ticonderoga Publications, 1998)
- New Adventures in Sci-Fi (Ticonderoga Publications, 1999) - Winner, Best Collected Work, 2000 Ditmar Award
- Light Bodies Falling (Altair Australia, 2007)
- Magic Dirt: The Best of Sean Williams (Ticonderoga Publications, 2008) - Winner, Best Collection, 2008 Aurealis Award
- The View from the End of the World (Andromeda Spaceways Inflight Magazine, 2020)
- Little Labyrinths: Speculative Microfictions (Brain Jar Press, 2021)
- Uncanny Angles (Wakefield Press (Australia), 2022)
- The Sky Inside (PS Publishing, 2023)

== Notable short stories ==
- "All the Wrong Places" (2016) Winner, Best SF Short Story, Aurealis Awards
- "The Seventh Letter" (2017) Winner, Best SF Short Story, Aurealis Awards
- "Passing the Bone" (1997) Winner, Best SF Short Story, Aurealis Awards
- "The Legend Trap" (2015) Winner, Best Novella or Novelette Short Story, Aurealis Awards
- “Last of the Rational Actors at the End of the Unnatural World” (2022) in Griffith Review
- “Face Value” (2013) in Lightspeed. This story was read by LeVar Burton on his podcast in 2019.
- “The Dark Matters” (2015) in Galaxy's Edge Magazine.
- “IMPACT” (2023) in From a Certain Point of View: Return of the Jedi
- "The Freezing of Sarah" (1997) in Bloodsongs #9
- "Entre les Beaux Morts en Vie (Among the Beautiful Living Dead)" (1998) in Dreaming Down-Under (ed. Jack Dann, Janeen Webb)
- "Hunting Ground" (2003) in Southern Blood: New Australian Tales of the Supernatural (ed. Bill Congreve)
- "haikaiju" (2005) in Daikaiju! Giant Monster Tales (ed. Robert Hood, Robin Pen)
- "daihaiku" (2005) in Daikaiju! Giant Monster Tales (ed. Robert Hood, Robin Pen)
- "The Tyranny of Distance" (2014) in SQ Mag, Edition 14 (ed. Sophie Yorkston)
- "The Legend Trap" (2014) in Kaleidoscope (Twelfth Planet Press) - Winner, Best Novella or Novelette, 2015 Ditmar Award
- Ghosts of the Fall
- White Christmas
- The Jackie Onassis Swamp-Buggy Concerto
- The Soap Bubble
- The Perfect Gun
- The Masque of Agamemnon (with Simon Brown)
- The Girl-Thing
- Star Wars: Or Die Trying (with Shane Dix)
- The Seventh Letter
- Midnight in the Cafe of the Black Madonna (Doctor Who)
