= Greg Bridges =

Australian artist

Greg Bridges is an Australian artist.

== Biography ==
Greg Bridges was born in Melbourne, Australia in the 1950s. When he was a child he was drawn into watching science-fiction films and was inspired by the artworks of Salvador Dalí.

He travelled throughout Australia and the United States, Japan and the continent of Europe. He does a lot of cover art for books and magazines, and constructed a concept illustration of the Dawn Treader for the film "The Voyage of the Dawn Treader".

He has won the Vivian C. Parker prize, the Macquarie University Award for Fine Art, the Pan Pacific Advertising award and the Design Down Under awards. He has also been awarded the Archibald Packing Room Prize, the International Communication Arts Award, and the Worldcon's Best Colour Professional Work Award.

== Awards ==
- 2017 World Fantasy Award, Best Artist (nominee)
