= Underground (McGahan novel) =

2006 novel by Andrew McGahan

- First edition
- Author: Andrew McGahan
- Language: English
- Publisher: Allen & Unwin, Australia
- Publication date: 2006
- Publication place: Australia
- Media type: Print (Paperback)
- Pages: 294
- ISBN: 1-74114-931-2
- OCLC: 83977616
- Dewey Decimal: 823/.914 22
- LC Class: PR9619.3.M3234 U53 2006

Underground is a 2006 novel by Australian author Andrew McGahan.

== Synopsis ==
In a near-future Australia the country is ruled by a right-wing Liberal Party without recourse to Parliament after a state of emergency is declared following a number of terrorist threats. This novel is narrated by Leo Jmes, twin brother of the Prime Minister, who is a prisoner in the House of Representatives in Canberra.

== Reception ==
A review of Underground in The Sydney Morning Herald called it "McGahan's most nakedly political work so far, positioning itself as a comment on the "war on terror" generally and a broadside against the Howard government in particular." that it "suffers from a fatal equivocation: it is neither hilarious nor penetrating enough." and "The bombastic action and outrageous twists of fate (Leo is kidnapped three times, by three separate groups, in the first 50 pages) does not allow for the analysis that might have given the novel authority."

Writing for Australian Quarterly Tony Smith noted: "For such a novel to succeed, it must begin from recognisable situations. By referring to events of the early twenty-first century, and speculating about the directions in which they point us, McGahan makes the outrageous events described by Leo James seem closer to inevitable than impossible. Certainly, the extent of change might seem too rapid for some readers, but the trends are undeniable. The Australia of the James brothers has become a place where 'there was no question of whether it was right or wrong - simply that it had worked'. The country has been developing into a cultural, political and ethical vacuum inviting a foreign power to use it, and the world's only superpower has obliged."

Steven R. Luebke, writing in Antipodes, outlined the main theme of the book: "At heart, McGahan's novel seems to be a call to Australians (and Americans) to remember their history, their tradition of democracy. In spite of the dystopian vision portrayed in the book, Leo's reflections recall a time when things were different, and McGahan seems to want to leave the reader with the sense that if enough people remember that, the nightmare of a totalitarian world need not come to pass."

== Awards ==
- International Dublin Literary Award, 2008: longlisted
- Australian Book Industry Awards, Australian Literary Fiction Book of the Year, 2007: shortlisted
- Queensland Premier's Literary Awards, Best Fiction Book, 2007: shortlisted
- Aurealis Awards for Excellence in Australian Speculative Fiction, Science Fiction Division, Novel, 2006: shortlisted
- FAW Christina Stead Award, 2006: highly commended
