= Aurealis Award for Best Fantasy Novel =

Annual Australian award for fantasy

Aurealis Award for best fantasy novel
- Awarded for: Excellence in fantasy fiction novels
- Country: Australia
- Presented by: Chimaera Publications, Continuum Foundation
- First award: 1995
- Currently held by: C. S. Pacat
- Website: Official site

The Aurealis Awards are presented annually by the Australia-based Chimaera Publications and WASFF to published works in order to "recognise the achievements of Australian science fiction, fantasy, horror writers". To qualify, a work must have been first published by an Australian citizen or permanent resident between 1 January and 31 December of the corresponding year; the presentation ceremony is held the following year. It has grown from a small function of around 20 people to a two-day event attended by over 200 people.

Since their creation in 1995, awards have been given in various categories of speculative fiction. Categories currently include science fiction, fantasy, horror, speculative young adult fiction—with separate awards for novels and short fiction—collections, anthologies, illustrative works or graphic novels, children's books, and an award for excellence in speculative fiction. The awards have attracted the attention of publishers by setting down a benchmark in science fiction and fantasy. The continued sponsorship by publishers such as HarperCollins and Orbit has identified the award as an honour to be taken seriously.

The results are decided by a panel of judges from a list of submitted nominees; the long-list of nominees is reduced to a short-list of finalists. Ties can occur if the panel decides both entries show equal merit, however they are encouraged to choose a single winner. The judges are selected from a public application process by the Award's management team.

This article lists all the short-list nominees and winners in the best fantasy novel category, as well as novels that have received honourable mentions or have been highly commended. Since 2003, honourable mentions and high commendations have been awarded intermittently. Juliet Marillier, Garth Nix hold the record for most wins with 4. Marillier holds the record for most nominations with 12, and Glenda Larke has the most nominations without winning, having been a losing finalist ten times.

== Winners and nominees ==
In the following table, the years correspond to the year of the book's eligibility; the ceremonies are always held the following year. Each year links to the corresponding "year in literature" article. Entries with a blue background have won the award; those with a white background are the nominees on the short-list.

* Winners and joint winners
* Nominees on the shortlist

Year	Author	Novel	Publisher	Ref
1995	Garth Nix*	Sabriel	Moonstone	
1995	David Brooks	The House of Balthus	Allen & Unwin	
1995	Sara Douglass	Battleaxe	Voyager Books	
1995	Paul Kidd	Mus of Kerbridge	TSR	
1995	Tony Shillitoe	The Last Wizard	Pan Macmillan	
1996	Jack Dann*	The Memory Cathedral	Bantam Books	
1996	Sara Douglass*	Enchanter	Voyager Books	
1996	Sara Douglass*	StarMan	Voyager Books	
1996	Shannah Jay	The Price of Wisdom	Pan Macmillan	
1996	Geoffrey McSkimming	Cairo Jim and the Alabastron of Forgotten Gods	Hachette Children's Books Australia	
1996	Dirk Strasser	Equinox	Pan Macmillan	
1997	Kim Wilkins*	The Infernal	Random House	
1997	Isobelle Carmody	Darkfall	Penguin Books	
1997	Sara Douglass	Sinner	Voyager Books	
1997	Kate Forsyth	Dragonclaw	Random House	
1997	Lucy Sussex	Black Ice	Hodder Headline	
1998	Dave Luckett*	A Dark Winter	Omnibus Books	
1998	Jane Routley*	Fire Angels	Avon Eos	
1998	Sara Douglass	Pilgrim	Voyager Books	
1998	Ian Irvine	A Shadow on the Glass	Penguin Books	
1998	Sophie Masson	Cold Iron	Hodder	
1999	Jane Routley*	Aramaya	Avon Eos	
1999	Sara Douglass	Crusader	Voyager Books	
1999	Kate Forsyth	The Cursed Towers	Random House	
1999	Dave Luckett	A Dark Journey/A Dark Victory	Omnibus Books	
1999	Juliet Marillier	Daughter of the Forest	Pan Macmillan	
2000	Juliet Marillier*	Son of the Shadows	Pan Macmillan	
2000	Sara Douglass	The Nameless Day	Voyager Books	
2000	Anthony Eaton	The Darkness	UQP	
2000	Jennifer Fallon	Medalon	Voyager Books	
2000	Hoa Pham	Vixen	Sceptre	
2001	Sara Douglass*	The Wounded Hawk	Voyager Books	
2001	Juliet Marillier	Child of the Prophecy	Pan Macmillan	
2001	Garth Nix	Lirael	Allen & Unwin	
2001	Cameron Rogers	The Music of Razors	Penguin Books	
2001	Sean Williams	The Stone Mage and the Sea	Voyager Books	
2002	Sean Williams*	The Storm Weaver and the Sand	Voyager Books	
2002	Trudi Canavan	The Novice	Voyager Books	
2002	Alison Croggon	The Gift	Penguin Books	
2002	Sara Douglass	Hades' Daughter	Voyager Books	
2002	Sara Douglass	The Crippled Angel	Voyager Books	
2002	Tony Shillitoe	Blood	Voyager Books	
2003	Garth Nix*	Abhorsen	Allen & Unwin	
2003	K. J. Bishop	The Etched City	Prime Books	
2003	Lian Hearn	Grass for His Pillow	Hodder	
2003	Glenda Larke	The Aware	Voyager Books	
2003	Sean McMullen	Voyage of the Shadowmoon	Tor Books	
2004	Sean Williams*	The Crooked Letter	Voyager Books	
2004	Lian Hearn	Brilliance of the Moon	Hodder	
2004	Glenda Larke	The Tainted	Voyager Books	
2004	Sophie Masson	Snow, Fire, Sword	Random House	
2004	Kim Wilkins	Giants of the Frost	Voyager Books	
2005	Juliet Marillier*	Blade of Fortriu	Pan Macmillan	
2005	Sara Douglass	Darkwitch Rising	Voyager Books	
2005	Anthony Eaton	Nightpeople	UQP	
2005	Sonya Hartnett	Surrender	Penguin Books	
2005	Karen Miller	The Innocent Mage	Voyager Books	
2006	Juliet Marillier*	Wildwood Dancing	Pan Macmillan	
2006	Grace Dugan	The Silver Road	Penguin Books	
2006	Glenda Larke	Heart of the Mirage	Voyager Books	
2006	Sean McMullen	Voidfarer	Tor Books	
2006	Michael Pryor	Blaze of Glory	Random House	
2007	Lian Hearn*	Heaven's Net Is Wide	Hachette	
2007	Jennifer Fallon	Gods of Amyrantha	Voyager Books	
2007	Sylvia Kelso	The Moving Water	Five Star Publishing	
2007	Glenda Larke	Song of the Shiver Barrens	Voyager Books	
2007	Michael Pryor	Heart of Gold	Random House	
2008	Alison Goodman*	The Two Pearls of Wisdom	HarperCollins	
2008	Sylvia Kelso	Amberlight	Juno Books	
2008	Margo Lanagan	Tender Morsels	Allen & Unwin	
2008	Juliet Marillier	Heir to Sevenwaters	Pan Macmillan	
2008	Karen Miller	The Riven Kingdom	HarperVoyager	
2009	Trudi Canavan*	Magician's Apprentice	Orbit Books	
2009	Peter M. Ball	Horn	Twelfth Planet Press	
2009	Glenda Larke	The Last Stormlord	HarperVoyager	
2009	K. E. Mills	Witches Incorporated	HarperVoyager	
2009	K. J. Taylor	The Dark Griffin	HarperVoyager	
2010	Tansy Rayner Roberts*	Power and Majesty	HarperVoyager	
2010	Andrea K Höst	The Silence of Medair	Andrea K Hösth	
2010	Trent Jamieson	Death Most Definite	Orbit Books	
2010	Glenda Larke	Stormlord Rising	HarperVoyager	
2010	Juliet Marillier	Heart's Blood	Pan Macmillan	
2011	Pamela Freeman*	Ember and Ash	Hachette	
2011	Jennifer Fallon	The Undivided	HarperVoyager	
2011	Glenda Larke	Stormlord's Exile	HarperVoyager	
2011	Jo Anderton	Debris	Angry Robot	
2011	Tansy Rayner Roberts	The Shattered City	HarperVoyager	
2012	Margo Lanagan*	Sea Hearts	Allen & Unwin	
2012	Kate Forsyth	Bitter Greens	Random House Australia	
2012	Jay Kristoff	Stormdancer	Tor UK	
2012	Juliet Marillier	Flame of Sevenwaters	Pan Macmillan Australia	
2012	Jo Spurrier	Winter Be My Shield	HarperVoyager	
2013	Mitchell Hogan*	A Crucible of Souls	Mitchell Hogan	
2013	Max Barry	Lexicon	Hachette Australia	
2013	Amie Kaufman & Meagan Spooner	These Broken Stars	Allen & Unwin	
2013	Garth Nix	Newt's Emerald	Jill Grinberg Literary Management	
2013	Tansy Rayner Roberts	Ink Black Magic	FableCroft Publishing	
2014	Juliet Marillier*	Dreamer's Pool	Pan Macmillan Australia	
2014	Keri Arthur	Fireborn	Hachette Australia	
2014	Amie Kaufman & Meagan Spooner	This Shattered World	Allen & Unwin	
2014	Glenda Larke	The Lascar's Dagger	Hachette Australia	
2014	Scott Westerfeld	Afterworlds	Penguin Books Australia	
2014	Kim Wilkins	Daughters of the Storm	Harlequin Enterprises Australia	
2015	Trent Jamieson*	Day Boy	Text Publishing	
2015	Kathryn Barker	In the Skin of a Monster	Allen & Unwin	
2015	Alison Goodman	Lady Helen and the Dark Days Club	HarperCollins	
2015	Glenda Larke	The Dagger's Path	HarperVoyager	
2015	Juliet Marillier	Tower of Thorns	Pan Macmillan Australia	
2015	Ilka Tampke	Skin	Text Publishing	
2016	Jay Kristoff*	Nevernight	HarperVoyager	
2016	Glenda Larke	The Fall of the Dagger	Hachette Australia	
2016	Juliet Marillier	Den of Wolves	Pan Macmillan Australia	
2016	Angela Slatter	Vigil	Jo Fletcher Books	
2016	Mark Smith	Road to Winter	Text Publishing	
2016	Kim Wilkins	Sisters of the Fire	Harlequin Australia	
2017	Jay Kristoff*	Godsgrave	HarperCollins Publishers	
2017	Thoraiya Dyer	Crossroads of Canopy	Tor Books	
2017	Goldie Goldbloom	Gwen	Fremantle Press	
2017	Kathryn Gossow	Cassandra	Odyssey Books	
2017	Michael Pryor	Gap Year in Ghost Town	Allen & Unwin	
2017	Robin Shortt	Wellside	Candlemark & Gleam	
2018	Sam Hawke*	City of Lies	Penguin Random House	
2018	Maria Lewis*	The Witch Who Courted Death	Hachette Australia	
2018	Alan Baxter	Devouring Dark	Grey Matter Press	
2018	Alison Goodman	Lady Helen and the Dark Days Deceit	HarperCollins Publishers	
2018	Aletha Kinsela	Lightning Tracks	Plainspeak Publishing	
2018	Devin Madson	We Ride the Storm	(self-published)	
2019	Garth Nix*	Angel Mage	Allen & Unwin	
2019	Jay Kristoff	Darkdawn	HarperCollins Publishers	
2019	Maria Lewis	The Wailing Woman	Piatkus	
2019	Juliet Marillier	The Harp of Kings	Macmillan	
2019	P. M. Freestone	The Darkest Bloom	Scholastic	
2019	Michael Pryor	Graveyard Shift in Ghost Town	Allen & Unwin	
2020	Garth Nix*	The Left-Handed Booksellers of London	Allen & Unwin	
2020	Sam Hawke*	Hollow Empire	Bantam Press	
2020	Claire McKenna	Monstrous Heart	HarperVoyager	
2020	Astrid Scholte	The Vanishing Deep	Allen & Unwin	
2020	Dirk Strasser	Conquist	Chimaera Publications	
2020	Bonnie Wynne	The Ninth Sorceress	Talem Press	
2021	C. S. Pacat*	Dark Rise	Allen & Unwin	
2021	Angela Slatter	All the Murmuring Bones	Titan Publishing	
2021	Freya Marske	A Marvellous Light	Tor	
2021	Maria Lewis	The Rose Daughter	Piatkus	
2021	Shelley Parker-Chan	She Who Became the Sun	Mantle	
2021	Meg Grace	Supermums: And So It Begins	(self-published)	
2022	Angela Slatter	Path of Thorns	Titan	
2022	Kate Emery	The Not So Chosen One	Text	
2022	Trent Jamieson	The Stone Road	Erewhon	
2022	Freya Marske	A Restless Truth	Tor	
2022	Daniel O'Malley	Blitz	HarperCollins	
2022	Sean Williams	Honour Among Ghosts	Allen & Unwin	
2023	James Islington	The Will of the Many	Text	
2023	Davinia Evans	Shadow Baron	Orbig	
2023	Garth Nix	The Sinister Booksellers of Bath	Allen & Unwin	
2023	Tansy Rayner Roberts	Of Knives and Night-Blooms	self-published	
2023	J. C. Rycroft	The Blood-Born Dragon	BattleWarrior Press	
2023	Michael Thompson	How to Be Remembered	Allen & Unwin	
2024	Alexandra Almond	Thoroughly Disenchanted	Voyager	
2024	Aman J. Bedi	Kavithri	Gollancz	
2024	Narrelle M. Harris	The She-Wolf of Baker Street	Clan Destine Press	
2024	Finegan Kruckemeyer	The End and Everything Before It	Text	
2024	A. G. Slatter	The Briar Book of the Dead	Titan Books	
2024	C. A. Wright	Skysong	Pantera	
2025	Kell Woods	Upon a Starlit Tide	Voyager	
2025	Will Greatwich	House of the Rain King	self-published	
2025	Kathleen Jennings	Honeyeater	Picador	
2025	Molly O'Neill	Greenteeth	Orbit	
2025	A. Rushby	Slashed Beauties	HQ Fiction	
2025	Richard Swan	Grave Empire	Orbit	

== Statistics ==
Multiple wins (as of 2022, after the 2021 winner announced):

- Juliet Marillier (4)
- Garth Nix (4)
- Sara Douglass (3)
- Jay Kristoff (3)
- Jane Routley (2)
- Sean Williams (2)

Most nominations:

- Juliet Marillier (12)
- Sara Douglass (11)
- Glenda Larke (10)
- Garth Nix (6)
- Jay Kristoff (4)
- Michael Pryor (4)
- Kim Wilkins (4)
- Jennifer Fallon (3)
- Kate Forsyth (3)
- Alison Goodman (3)
- Lian Hearn (3)
- Maria Lewis (3)
- Tansy Rayner Roberts (3)
- Sean Williams (3)

== Honourable mentions and highly commended novels ==
In the following table, the years correspond to the year of the book's eligibility; the ceremonies are always held the following year. Each year links to the corresponding "year in literature" article. Entries with a grey background have been noted as highly commended; those with a white background have received honourable mentions.

* Highly commended
* Honourable mentions

Year	Author	Novel	Publisher	Ref
2003	Ian Irvine	Scrutator	Viking Press	
2003	Anthony O'Neil	Lamplighter	HarperCollins	
2005	Trudi Canavan*	Priestess of the White	Voyager Books	
2006	Kylie Chan	White Tiger	Voyager Books	
2006	Lian Hearn	The Harsh Cry of the Heron	Hachette Livre	
2007	Pamela Freeman	Blood Ties	Hachette Australia	
2007	Karen Miller	Empress of Mijak	Voyager Books	

== See also ==
- Ditmar Award, an Australian science fiction award established in 1969
