= Fallen Moon =

Fallen Moon or variation, may refer to:

- The Fallen Moon, sci-fi novel by Ian Watson (author) 1994
- Fallen Moon series of fantasy novels by K. J. Taylor that include The Dark Griffin (2009) and The Griffin's Flight
- Fallen Moon (manga), an anthology comic book by Toui Hasumi
- The Fallen Moon, a fictional band from the manga Fuuka
- Fallen Moon, a fictional band from the manga Suzuka; see List of Suzuka characters
- Abbey of the Fallen Moon, a fictional location from Pillars of Eternity: The White March
- Fallen Moon, film project by Peter Medak

== See also ==
- Falling Moon (disambiguation)
- Moonfall (disambiguation)
- Fallen (disambiguation)
- Moon (disambiguation)
