= A Dark Victory =

1999 novel by Dave Luckett

- A Dark Victory first edition cover.
- Author: Dave Luckett
- Cover artist: Joe Bond
- Language: English
- Series: Tenabran Trilogy
- Genre: Fantasy, young adult
- Publisher: Omnibus Books
- Publication date: 1999
- Publication place: Australia
- Media type: Print (Paperback)
- Pages: 317 pp (first edition)
- ISBN: 1-86291-406-0
- Preceded by: A Dark Journey

A Dark Victory is a 1999 young adult fantasy novel by Dave Luckett and is the last book in the Tenabran Trilogy. It follows the story of how Will is preparing for his final battle as Prince Nathan's armies mass on the moors.

== Background ==
A Dark Victory was first published in Australia in 1999 by Omnibus Books in paperback format. A Dark Victory won the 1999 Aurealis Award for best young-adult novel and was a short-list nominee both the 2000 Ditmar Award for best novel and the 1999 Aurealis Award for best fantasy novel but lost to Greg Egan's Teranesia and Jane Routley's Aramaya respectively.
