= The Magician's Apprentice (novel) =

Fantasy novel by Trudi Canavan

- First edition cover
- Author: Trudi Canavan
- Language: English
- Series: Prequel to The Black Magician Trilogy
- Genre: Fantasy
- Publisher: Orbit Books
- Publication date: February 23, 2009
- Media type: Print (Hardcover)
- Pages: 593 pp
- ISBN: 978-0-316-03788-4
- OCLC: 225870376
- Followed by: The Magicians' Guild

The Magician's Apprentice is a fantasy novel by author Trudi Canavan. It was published in February 2009, and is a stand-alone prequel telling a story occurring hundreds of years before her bestselling Black Magician Trilogy. It tells the story of a war between Kyralia and Sachaka through the eyes of Tessia, a young woman and magician from a countryside village. The novel won the Aurealis Award 2009 for the best fantasy novel.

== Plot summary ==
In the remote village of Mandryn in Kyralia, Tessia serves as assistant to her father, the village Healer – much to the frustration of her mother, who would rather she found a husband. Despite knowing that women aren't readily accepted by the Guild of Healers, Tessia is determined to follow in her father's footsteps.

Kyralia and the neighbouring country Sachaka have been at a certain "peace" for centuries, though the countries dislike each other, for Kyralia was once part of the Sachakan Empire. Lord Dakon is housing a visiting Sachakan Lord and Magician (Takado), much to his dislike. Dakon is a kind man with noble intentions. He is wary of Takado and dislikes the Sachakans for not abolishing slavery, especially when Takado beats his slave (Hanara) to near death. Tessia and her father are called to heal him.

One day when Tessia comes by herself to Lord Dakon's mansion to re-apply bandages to Hanara, Takado tries to force himself upon her, holding her body still with magic. Tessia removes the magical influence on her mind with magic of her own, which she had no idea she had (blowing apart the corner of the room in the process), discovering she is a natural. She becomes the second apprentice of Lord Dakon, and Takado leaves the premises.

There are long hours of study and self-discipline, and Lord Dakon's other apprentice, Jayan, makes clear his dislike of her, Tessia's new life also offers more opportunities than she expected. There are fine clothes and servants, and regular trips to the great city of Imardin.

While staying in Imardin her home town is attacked. A "mental" call is produced from another magician who is in the ley (town) closest to Dakon's. Tessia is able to hear this while she is out shopping with her fellow female magicians, who all hear the same thing.

Upon arriving at the ley they find that Takado has slaughtered the entire village except for some children and deserters. Tessia is then distressed to find graves marked for her parents. Upon this discovery, Tessia is hurt by the fact she never got to tell her father about visiting the healer's guild (in which their family are now somewhat respected in the guild through their grandfather), or about visiting a dissection at which she found a friend, Kendaria. Tessia then sets out to be a healer. During the process, Jayan and Tessia become friends.

The Kyralian magicians then come together and decide to attack the Sachakan 'Ichani' (people branded as outcasts in Sachakan society) as they realise a plot to take their country.

Meanwhile, Takado has gathered an army of his own. In the "first fight", the Kyralian magicians use a technique of sharing magical energy, allowing them to send magic to another without harming them and so enabling them to attack in groups. None fall on the Kyralian side but the Sachakans lose many. Tessia treats many people and soon develops a way to stop pain with magic, something never before achieved as Magicians never become healers.

A subplot revolves around Stara, a mixed race woman born to an Ashaki (Sachakan magician of high social standing) and an Elyne woman, Elyne being a neighbouring country to both Kyralia and Sachaka. Living in Arvice (the Sachakan capital) Stara is forced to marry against her will, yet when she shows her father her magic, which she has kept secret for years, her father is forced to decide another, Karicho. Stara must bed Karicho in order to heir a son, or her sister-in-law, being infertile, will be killed by her father. Yet there is one problem: Karicho is a "lad" (a male homosexual).

Stara becomes friends with other wives, and they invite her into a group made up of wives and slaves called the "Traitors", who secretly declare themselves a neutral third party in the Kyralian-Sachakan conflict. Unintentionally, Stara becomes the leader with her natural beauty, magic and leadership skills. She and her slave, who is also her best friend, set out to find a way to get the "Traitors" away from Arvice before the invading Kyralians kill any of them.

The invading Kyralians take Arvice, but Jayan and Tessia are separated from them. Jayan is badly wounded, but Tessia figures out how to heal with magic, and saves him. While she is healing him, he confesses his love for her, and she him. They hide in a house and fall asleep. The next morning, they hear horses, and go outside to see it is their allies. They join up with the rest of the army, and Dakon is relieved to see his ex-apprentice (Jayan is now a full magician) and his apprentice are safe. However, Dakon is staying behind to help rule Sachaka, so Lady Avaria takes over Tessia's apprenticeship, and Jayan, Avaria and Tessia return to Kyralia together. Jayan founds the Magician's Guild and Tessia teaches her healing magic to others.

Stara and the Traitors escape Arvice and find a refuge in the mountains. There are ruins of a house there, filled with jewels. A river is nearby and the land is fertile. The Traitor society has begun.

10 years later Narvelan, one of Sachaka's rulers, is forced to retire by the king, taking his loyal servant, Hanara, with him. He breaks the storestone, a stone filled with magic, which kills him and Hanara and renders acres of Sachakan land infertile. It is revealed Dakon was assassinated.

Jayan and his friend Prinan come to look at the land. Jayan reflects on the establishment of the Magician's Guild and that Tessia is just about to give birth to his son. Tessia is now famous for her discovery of healing magic, and is the best healing magician in the world.
