= City of Lies (novel) =

2018 book by Sam Hawke

- Author: Sam Hawke
- Series: Poison War
- Genre: Young adult urban fantasy, murder mystery
- Publisher: Tor.com
- Publication date: July 3, 2018
- Pages: 560
- ISBN: 978-0-7653-9689-1
- Followed by: Hollow Empire

City of Lies is a 2018 urban fantasy murder mystery novel by Sam Hawke. It is Hawke's debut novel and the first installment in the Poison War series.

== Background ==
The book was Hawke's debut novel. She stated in an interview that she wanted to write "what was effectively a closed room mystery in a fantasy setting, as a kind of homage to my two favourite genres of stories growing up." In writing the book, she wanted to avoid the usual tropes and character archetypes of the fantasy genre.

== Synopsis ==
Jov and Kalina are brother and sister, born to a family of spymasters in the city-state of Silastra who are tasked with protecting the Chancellor from poison. After both the Chancellor and Etan, their mentor and uncle, are poisoned they must work together to solve the murders.

== Reception ==
The book was well received by critics for its portrayal of sibling dynamics, urban fantasy style worldbuilding, intrigue, and representation of disability. Kirkus Reviews called it "A well-crafted debut with believable political intrigues, solid worldbuilding, and original characters." Paul Weimer of Tor.com praised the worldbuilding and writing, but felt the ending was "frustrating" in comparison to the first portions of the book. Emma Davis of the Fantasy Book Review, gave the book a rating of 8/10, praising the overall plot and mystery while criticizing aspects of the language and pacing.

The book won the 2019 Ditmar Award for Best Novel, the 2019 Norma K. Hemming Award, and was tied for the 2018 Aurealis Award for Best Fantasy Novel with Maria Lewis' The Witch Who Courted Death. It was longlisted for the BSFA Award in 2019.
