= Falling Moon =

Falling Moon or variation, may refer to:

- Moonset, the setting (falling) of the moon, analogue of sunset
- "Falling Moon" (song), a 2011 song by Ulala Session off the album Superstar K 3
- "The Falling Moon" (story), a 1966 comics storyline from the comic book The Trigan Empire
- "Falling Moon" (story), a 1962 comics storyline from Flash Gordon; see List of Flash Gordon comic strips
- Falling Moon Flower (散月花, Sangekka), a fictional element from Shuriken Sentai Ninninger; see List of Shuriken Sentai Ninninger characters

== See also ==
- Moonfall (disambiguation)
- Fallen Moon (disambiguation)
- Falling (disambiguation)
- Moon (disambiguation)
