= Voice of God (disambiguation) =

The voice of God is a religious concept concerning divine communication by or from God. "Voice of God" may also refer to:

== People nicknamed "The voice of God" ==
- Andrea Bocelli, singer
- Bob Sheppard, public-address announcer
- Don LaFontaine, narrator of many film trailers
- Don Pardo, television announcer
- Hemant Kumar, Indian singer and composer
- John Facenda, narrator of American football films
- Morgan Freeman, actor

== Other ==
- "Voice of God" (song), 2020 song by Dante Bowe
- Voice of God (weapon)
- Voice of God Collective, Billy Jenkins-led band with many Loose Tubes members

== See also ==
- Voice of the Gods, 2006 Australian novel
- Vox populi, vox Dei, Latin phrase meaning voice of the people is the voice of God
