= Dark Winter =

Dark Winter may refer to:

- A Dark Winter, a 1998 novel by Dave Luckett
- Operation Dark Winter, a 2001 U.S. bio-terrorist attack simulation
- Dark Winter, a 2001 novel by William Dietrich
- Dark Winter, a 2003 Nick Stone Missions novel by Andy McNab
- Dark Winter, a 2012 novel by David Mark
- Dark Winter, a 2018 novel by Cameron Lisney, first book in the Fateweaver series
