= Hollow Empire =

2020 book by Sam Hawke

- Author: Sam Hawke
- Language: English
- Genre: Urban fantasy
- Publisher: Tor.com
- Publication date: December 1, 2020
- Publication place: Australia
- Pages: 560
- Preceded by: City of Lies

Hollow Empire is a 2020 urban fantasy novel by Sam Hawke. It is the second and final installment in the Poison Wars series, following City of Lies.

== Synopsis ==
Jov and Kalina face attempts to discredit them as they unravel a conspiracy to infiltrate the highest levels of Silastra's government.

== Reception ==
The book was praised by critics for its portrayal of political intrigues and characterization, and was considered by some to be an improvement on its predecessor. Publishers Weekly wrote "Fans will savor Hawke’s well-shaded characters, the lavish descriptions of their fictional world, and Hawke’s acute analyses of self-doubt, guilt, discrimination, and recrimination." Colin Steele of The Canberra Times wrote that it "cleverly merges real-world issues such as fake news, religious fanaticism and misogyny into an engrossing fantasy". The book was nominated for the 2021 Ditmar Award for Best Novel and the 2020 Aurealis Award for Best Fantasy Novel.
