= A Dark Winter =

1998 novel by Dave Luckett

- A Dark Winter first edition cover.
- Author: Dave Luckett
- Cover artist: Joe Bond
- Language: English
- Series: Tenabran Trilogy
- Genre: Fantasy
- Publisher: Omnibus Books
- Publication date: 1998
- Publication place: Australia
- Media type: Print (Paperback)
- Pages: 328 pp (first edition)
- ISBN: 1-86291-368-4
- Followed by: A Dark Journey

A Dark Winter is a 1998 fantasy novel by Dave Luckett. It follows the story of Willan "Will" de Parkin who along with Silvus and Sister Winterridge have set out to defeat the Dark armies and save the castle of Ys.

== Background ==
A Dark Winter was first published in Australia in 1998 by Omnibus Books in paperback format. It won the 1998 Aurealis Award for best fantasy novel and was also a short-list nominee for the 1998 Aurealis Award for best young-adult novel but lost to Alison Goodman's Singing the Dogstar Blues.
