= The Two Pearls of Wisdom =

Book by Alison Goodman

- The Two Pearls of Wisdom first edition cover.
- Author: Alison Goodman
- Cover artist: Larry Rostant
- Language: English
- Genre: Fantasy
- Publisher: HarperCollins
- Publication date: 1 August 2008
- Publication place: Australia
- Media type: Print (hardback & paperback)
- Pages: 674 pp (first edition)
- ISBN: 978-0-7322-8800-6
- Followed by: Eona The Last Dragoneye

The Two Pearls of Wisdom (also known as Eon, Eon: Dragoneye Reborn, or Eon: Rise of the Dragoneye) is a 2008 fantasy novel by Alison Goodman. It follows the story of Eon, who has potential to become a Dragoneye, being able to control wind, water and land. However, Eon is actually a girl concealed as a boy, and with girls forbidden, she becomes a dangerous gamble.

== Background ==
The Two Pearls of Wisdom was first published in Australia on 1 August 2008 by HarperCollins in trade paperback format. It was rereleased under the two different titles of Eon: Dragoneye Reborn and Eon: Rise of the Dragoneye in the Australia, United Kingdom and the United States. It has been released in over five different languages, and in the United States and United Kingdom, it has been released in both hardback and paperback formats. The Two Pearls of Wisdom won the 2008 Aurealis Award for best fantasy novel and was named an honour book in the 2008 James Tiptree Jr. Awards. It was also named a notable book in the 2009 CBCA Awards and was shortlisted in both the 2009 NSW Premier's Literary Awards and the Ethel Turner Prize.

== Plot ==
Dragoneyes are the human links to the twelve dragons of good fortune, who provide energy to the earth. Sixteen-year-old Eon has been studying the ancient art of Dragon Magic for four years, hoping to be selected as apprentice to a Dragoneye. However, circumstances do not favour Eon for two reasons; first, because he is disabled and secondly, because "he" is secretly female. On the choosing day, the long-lost Mirror Dragon returns and chooses Eona, who becomes a Lord due to the absence of a current Mirror Dragoneye. Much to the fury of the evil Lord Ido, all the dragons bow to the Mirror Dragon, including his.

Meanwhile, the country is on the brink of civil war. A battle is about to break out between the Emperor and one of his brothers, High Lord Sethon, who wishes to make a claim for the throne. Lord Ido has allied himself with Sethon. The Emperor and his heir, Prince Kygo, attempt to use the return of the Mirror Dragon as a good omen for their reign, which throws Eona into the midst of their struggle for power. The only people she knows she can trust are her best friend Dillon, the transgender courtier Lady Dela, and Dela's bodyguard Ryko.

When Ido discovers Eona's true gender, her dragon disappears. When talking to Dillon, Eona realises that she does not know her dragon's name and thus cannot communicate properly. To remedy this, she must find and decode the red folio of the Mirror Dragon. In Ido's library, she meets an almost insane Dillon who finds both the red folio and another black folio, detailing how it is possible to create a 'String of Pearls', with two Dragoneyes harnessing the power of the normal 12. She puts the pieces together and realizes that Ido wishes for the two of them to be the only two Dragoneyes left alive.

Prince Kygo flees and the Emperor's only other heir is killed by Lord Sethon. In desperation Dela, Eona, and Ryko try to escape but Ido orders his men to find them. As the warfare escalates and all seems to be lost, Lady Dela screams out that the dragon's name is her name: Eona. She summons her dragon, the Queen of the Heavens. They are finally united at last, with Eona's crippled leg healing in the process. Together, the Mirror Dragon and Dragoneye force compassion upon Ido and the trio make their escape to the river.
