= Glenda Larke =

Australian writer

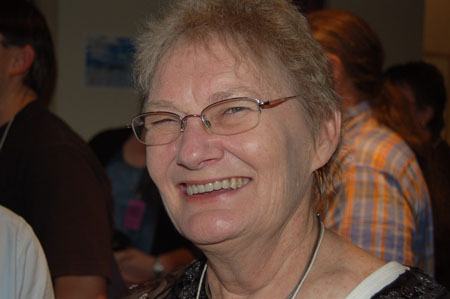
- Larke in 2007
- Born: Glenyce Larke; Western Australia
- Writing career
- Pen name: Glenda Noramly
- Genre: Fantasy
- Website: glendalarke.com

Glenda Larke, born Glenyce Larke, is an Australian writer.

== Biography ==
Larke grew up in Western Australia. She obtained a degree in history and a diploma in education at University of Western Australia and has taught English in Australia, Vienna, Tunisia and Malaysia. Since 2013 she has lived in Mandurah, Western Australia with her husband, who works with the United Nations, and two children.

Larke's first novel, Havenstar was published in 1998 by Virgin Worlds in the UK under her married name of Glenda Noramly.

In 2003, she returned to the fantasy genre under the name of Glenda Larke when Voyager Books released The Aware, the first book in The Isles of Glory trilogy. The Aware was a finalist in the 2003 Aurealis Award for Best Fantasy Novel. Gilfeather and The Tainted completed the trilogy. The Tainted was a finalist in the 2004 Aurealis Award.

The Isles of Glory was shortly followed by Larke's second trilogy The Mirage Makers. It includes Heart of the Mirage, which was released in 2006 and was a finalist in the 2006 Aurealis Award for Best Fantasy Novel, The Shadow of Tyr and Song of the Shiver Barrens, both released in 2007.

The Lascar's Dagger won both the Tin Duck Award and the Ditmar Award in 2015; The Fall of the Dagger won the Tin Duck Award in 2017.

The Watergivers (The Stormlord Trilogy) won the Sara Douglass Book Series Award in 2015.

Larke also writes non-fiction, usually articles on conservation issues, particularly those relating to bird conservation. These articles are mostly published in Malaysian nature magazines.

== Bibliography ==
- Havenstar (1998, as Glenda Noramly)

=== The Isles of Glory ===
- The Aware (2003)
- Gilfeather (2004)
- The Tainted (2004)

=== The Mirage Makers ===
- Heart of the Mirage (2006)
- The Shadow of Tyr (2007)
- Song of the Shiver Barrens (2007)

=== The Watergivers ===
Series also referred to as The Stormlord Trilogy

- The Last Stormlord (2009)
- Stormlord Rising (2010)
- Stormlord's Exile (2011)

=== The Forsaken Lands ===
- The Lascar's Dagger (2014)
- The Dagger’s Path (2015)
- The Fall of the Dagger (2016)

== Awards and nominations ==
=== Aurealis Awards ===
Best Fantasy Novel

- Finalist: The Aware (2003)
- Finalist: The Tainted (2004)
- Finalist: Heart of the Mirage (2006)
- Finalist: Song of the Shiver Barrens (2007)
- Finalist: The Last Stormlord (2009)
- Finalist: Stormlord Rising (2010)
- Finalist: Stormlord's Exile (2011)
- Finalist: The Lascar's Dagger (2014)
- Finalist: The Dagger's Path (2015)
- Finalist: The Fall of the Dagger (2016)
