= Fence (comic book) =

American comic book series

- Volume 1 cover

Publication information
- Publisher: Boom! Studios
- Format: Ongoing series
- Genre: Sports
- Publication date: November 2017 – November 2018; November 2018 – present (OGNs)
- No. of issues: 20

Creative team
- Created by: C. S. Pacat & Johanna the Mad
- Written by: C. S. Pacat
- Artist: Johanna the Mad
- Letterer: Jim Campbell
- Colorist: Joana Lafuente
- Editor(s): Shannon Watters & Dafna Pleban

Fence is an American comic book series published by Boom! Studios written by C. S. Pacat and drawn by Johanna the Mad. The story focuses on Nicholas Cox, an illegitimate son of U.S. fencing Olympic champion Robert Coste, who aspires to become a fencing champion like his father. Talented but poorly trained, Nicholas earns a scholarship at the elite boys school Kings Row and becomes roommate with his rival Seiji Katayama.

Pacat was inspired to create Fence due to her love for the sport, which she practiced in high school, and her interest in sports manga like Haikyu!!. The series received positive response from fans and critics and is noted for its queer representation.

The original Fence series ran for 12 issues from 2017 to 2018. The story has since continued in a number of original graphic novels (OGNs), limited series, and one-shots.

== Plot ==
Nicholas Cox, the illegitimate son of top fencer Robert Coste, and brother to Jesse Coste, is a wannabe fencer with a lot of natural talent but no professional training. In his first tournament match, his opponent is the legendary Seiji Katayama, who he is utterly trashed by- but not before they make a negative lasting impact on each other.

Fast forward a few months. Nicholas has been given a scholarship to Kings Row high school. His scholarship is for fencing, so him staying there depends on his being able to get on the team. Nicholas must go up against and defeat many other talented fencers for his spot, including Seiji himself.

Nicholas is again unable to defeat Seiji, but does well enough to become one of the team's reserves along with Eugene Labao. Now that Seiji and Nicholas are teammates as well as roommates, they are forced to work together. Seiji gives Nicholas some pointers, apparently out of pure annoyance to the fact that Nicholas was such an untrained fencer. But, in the latest installment, "Fence: Redemption", they went on a trip through Nicholas' home town after the Halvertown Training Camp came to its end, something that is most likely supposed to be interpreted as a date.

== Production ==
=== Development ===
Fence was first announced by Boom! Studios on August 17, 2017, to be released under their Boom! Box imprint. It was announced that the comic would be written by C. S. Pacat, writer of the Captive Prince trilogy, and drawn by Johanna the Mad. Regarding the collaboration between the two, Pacat stated that she had been a fan of Johanna for years, ever since she saw Johanna's fan art of Mulan. Similarly, one of the elements that draw Johanna to the project was the chance to work with Pacat, and also because she's interested in LGBTQ-related stories.

The first issue was given a November release date. One of the variant covers for issue one was drawn by Shanen Pae, the artist of Dream Daddy: A Dad Dating Simulator. On January 4, 2018, it was announced that Boom! Studios had upgraded Fence from a limited series to an ongoing series. Boom! Studios editor, Dafna Pleban, cited the positive response from "retailers, fans and press" as the main reason for upgrading Fence to an ongoing series.

=== Writing ===
Regarding her inspiration for Fence, Pacat revealed that she fenced épée in high school and fell in love with the sport; she particularly liked its psychological aspect, as fencers are required to make "split-second decisions with everything on the line". Another source of inspiration was her six-year stay in Japan. While there, she became interested in sports manga, including Haikyu!! and Hikaru no Go. Pacat worked with an épée coach to choreograph the fight scenes to develop the fencing characterization of each character and ensure they all have different strengths and weaknesses that can change with the narrative.

Regarding the portrayal of same-sex relationships within the story, Pacat stated that including queer characters and love stories within her stories is highly important to her. Additionally, she stated that she prefers to write "joyously and unabashedly queer" stories rather than sad ones. She also noted that quite often, sports anime, manga and comics are very "het masculine" and often exclude queer characters.

== Reception ==
=== Critical response ===
Aggregate scores

Comic Book Roundup
Issue	Rating	Reviews	Ref.
1	7.3/10	14	
2	8/10	3	
3	7.7/10	6	

Fence has received a positive response from critics. On review aggregator website Comic Book Roundup, the comic has an average rating of 7.7 out of 10, based on 23 reviews, indicating favorable reviews.

Reviewing the first issue, Kat Calamia from Newsarama gave it a score of 8 out of 10, saying that "it kept [her] entertained with its character building and peek into the world of fencing", further stating the issue's cliffhanger had her hooked regarding the future of Nicholas and Seiji's rivalry.

=== Sales ===
In October 2017, Shanen Pae's variant cover of Fence #1 was 17th most advance reordered comic book, while the main cover ranked 24th (out of the top 25 advance reorders).

== Publications ==
Comic Issues
Issue Title	Publication Date	Creators
Fence #1	Nov 15, 2017	C. S. Pacat (writer), Johanna the Mad (artist), Joana Lafuente (colorist)
Fence #2	Dec 20, 2017	C. S. Pacat (writer), Johanna the Mad (artist), Joana Lafuente (colorist)
Fence #3	Jan 17, 2018	C. S. Pacat (writer), Johanna the Mad (artist), Joana Lafuente (colorist)
Fence #4	Feb 21, 2018	C. S. Pacat (writer), Johanna the Mad (artist), Joana Lafuente (colorist)
Fence #5	Apr 18, 2018	C. S. Pacat (writer), Johanna the Mad (artist), Joana Lafuente (colorist)
Fence #6	May 16, 2018	C. S. Pacat (writer), Johanna the Mad (artist), Joana Lafuente (colorist)
Fence #7	Jun 20, 2018	C. S. Pacat (writer), Johanna the Mad (artist), Joana Lafuente (colorist)
Fence #8	Jul 08, 2018	C. S. Pacat (writer), Johanna the Mad (artist), Joana Lafuente (colorist)
Fence #9	Aug 15, 2018	C. S. Pacat (writer), Johanna the Mad (artist), Joana Lafuente (colorist)
Fence #10	Sep 26, 2018	C. S. Pacat (writer), Johanna the Mad (artist), Joana Lafuente (colorist)
Fence #11	Oct 31, 2018	C. S. Pacat (writer), Johanna the Mad (artist), Joana Lafuente (colorist)
Fence #12	Nov 28, 2018	C. S. Pacat (writer), Johanna the Mad (artist), Joana Lafuente (colorist)
Fence: Redemption #1	June 7, 2023	C. S. Pacat (writer), Johanna the Mad (artist), Joana Lafuente (colorist)
Fence: Redemption #2	July 5, 2023	C. S. Pacat (writer), Johanna the Mad (artist), Joana Lafuente (colorist)
Fence: Redemption #3	Aug 2, 2023	C. S. Pacat (writer), Johanna the Mad (artist), Joana Lafuente (colorist)
Fence: Redemption #4	Sep 13, 2023	C. S. Pacat (writer), Johanna the Mad (artist), Joana Lafuente (colorist)
Fence Challengers: Long Shot #1	July 24, 2024	C. S. Pacat (writer), Johanna the Mad (artist), Joana Lafuente (colorist)
Fence Challengers: Sweet Sixteen #1	Jan 1, 2025	C. S. Pacat (writer), Johanna the Mad (artist), Joana Lafuente (colorist)
Fence Breakthrough: Game Changer #1	Jul 30, 2025	C. S. Pacat (writer), Johanna the Mad (artist), Joana Lafuente (colorist)
Fence Breakthrough: QuarterClash #1	Jan, 2026	C. S. Pacat (writer), Johanna the Mad (artist), Joana Lafuente (colorist)

Collected Volumes and OGNs
Title	Collects	Publication Date	Creators
Fence Vol. 1	Fence #1-4	Jul 31, 2018	C. S. Pacat (writer), Johanna the Mad (artist), Joana Lafuente (colorist)
Fence Vol. 2	Fence #5-8	Jan 15, 2019	C. S. Pacat (writer), Johanna the Mad (artist), Joana Lafuente (colorist)
Fence Vol. 3	Fence #9-12	Aug 20, 2019	C. S. Pacat (writer), Johanna the Mad (artist), Joana Lafuente (colorist)
Fence Vol. 4: Rivals	OGN	Jun 30, 2020	C. S. Pacat (writer), Johanna the Mad (artist), Joana Lafuente (colorist)
Fence Vol. 5: Rise	OGN	Aug 16, 2022	C. S. Pacat (writer), Johanna the Mad (artist), Joana Lafuente (colorist)
Fence Vol. 6: Redemption	Fence: Redemption #1–4	Jan 16, 2024	C. S. Pacat (writer), Johanna the Mad (artist), Joana Lafuente (colorist)
Fence Vol. 7: Challengers	Fence Challengers: Long Shot #1, Fence Challengers: Sweet Sixteen #1	Jul 29, 2025	C. S. Pacat (writer), Johanna the Mad (artist), Joana Lafuente (colorist)

Novels
Title	Author	Publication Date
Fence: Striking Distance	Sarah Rees Brennan	Sep 29, 2020
Fence: Disarmed	Sarah Rees Brennan	May 18, 2021

=== Webtoon ===
In September 2025, it was announced that the series would be rereleased as a vertical scrolling webcomic on Webtoon.
