= Fire Angels =

Fantasy novel by Jane Routley

- Fire Angels first edition cover
- Author: Jane Routley
- Cover artist: Donato Giancola
- Language: English
- Genre: Fantasy novel
- Publisher: Avon Eos
- Publication date: 1 June 1998
- Publication place: Australia
- Media type: Print (Paperback)
- Pages: 436 pp (first edition)
- ISBN: 978-0-380-79425-6
- Preceded by: Mage Heart
- Followed by: Aramaya

Fire Angels is a 1998 fantasy fiction novel by Jane Routley. It follows the first book in the series, Mage Heart, with Dion reuniting with family and finding her homeland overrun with Witch Hunters and Fire Angels.

== Background ==
Fire Angels was first published in the United States on 1 June 1998 by Avon Eos in trade paperback format. It was released the United States and Australia in mass market paperback format in January 1999 and September 2000 respectively. Fire Angels won the 1998 Aurealis Award for best fantasy novel.
