= Dark Rise =

2021 book by C. S. Pacat

- Author: C. S. Pacat
- Genre: Young adult fantasy
- Publisher: Quill Tree Books, HarperCollins (US), A&U Children's, Allen & Unwin (AU)
- Publication date: September 28, 2021
- Pages: 464

Dark Rise is a 2021 young adult fantasy novel by Australian author C. S. Pacat. Published on September 28, 2021, it is the first book in the Dark Rise series.

The second book in the series, Dark Heir, was released on November 14, 2023.

== Synopsis ==
In 1821 England, 17-year-old orphan Will Kempen has been on the run from his mother's killers for nine months. Though unsure why he is their target, he ends up captured and imprisoned aboard the ship of Lord Crenshaw, a wealthy businessman. While captured, Will witnesses a seemingly magic sword destroy parts of the ship and kill several of Crenshaw's men. Amidst the ensuing chaos, Will is saved from drowning by Violet, the illegitimate half-Indian daughter of a lord who seeks to follow in her brother Tom's footsteps and become a well-respected member of Crenshaw's crew.

After overhearing a family secret concerning her, Violet runs away with Will and together they discover a secret society called the Stewards, an ancient order of people devoted to protecting the world from dark magic. They learn from the Stewards of a once powerful Dark King, who the Stewards believe will rise again. With reason to believe that Will is from a bloodline with powerful magic, the Stewards seek to train him and unleash his inner magic in order to defeat the Dark King.

== Reception ==
The book received mixed to positive reviews from critics, with praise for reinterpreting tropes of YA fantasy. Publishers Weekly wrote that "Pacat uses fully fleshed-out, realistically flawed characters and a rich, if occasionally rote, mythology to explore issues of faith, fate, and free will."

Natalie Zutter, in a review for Tor.com, praised the setting but felt that the Stewards were too one-dimensional and pure, while the themes of temptation and darkness were underexplored compared to Pacat's previous work.

Kirkus Reviews praised the complex characterization of the novel, but felt that the head-hopping between POV characters made it difficult to connect with the story. Carrie R. Wheadon of Common Sense Media wrote that, despite good worldbuilding, the characters were largely unlikeable with the exception of Violet.

The book received the 2021 Aurealis Award for Best Fantasy Novel.
