= The Accidental Sorcerer =

2009 novel

- The Accidental Sorcerer first edition cover.
- Author: K. E. Mills
- Language: English
- Series: Rogue Agent
- Genre: Fantasy novel
- Publisher: Orbit Books
- Publication date: 2009
- Publication place: Australia
- Media type: Print (Paperback)
- Pages: 560 pp (first edition)
- ISBN: 978-0-316-03542-2
- Followed by: Witches Incorporated

The Accidental Sorcerer is the first book in the Rogue Agent series by Australian writer Karen Miller.

== Synopsis ==
The Accidental Sorcerer follows haphazard wizard Gerald Dunwoody as he begins his employment as Royal Court Wizard to King Lional of New Ottosland, mentored by his friend Monk. Gerald takes the job reluctantly, and soon discovers that the King may not have his best interest in mind.

== Publication ==
The Accidental Sorcerer was published in September 2008 by Voyager Books, an imprint of HarperCollins.

== Response ==
Publishers Weekly called it "droll" and "whimsical". SF Site praised it for mixing humor with more serious themes but SFF World felt the combination did not work. A reviewer for the Herald Sun described the work as a "Harry Potter for grown-ups tale". In The Dominion Post, Morris noted that it reads "almost" as "fantasy satire".
