= Pamela Freeman =

Australian writer (born 1960)

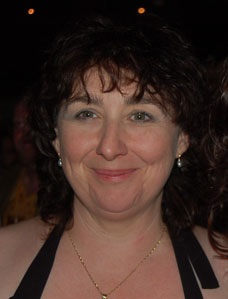
- Freeman in 2007
- Born: April 1960 (age 66); Sydney, New South Wales, Australia
- Occupation: Writer
- Writing career
- Genres: Fantasy, children's literature
- Website: pamelafreemanbooks.com

Pamela Freeman is an Australian author of books for both adults and children. Most of her work is fantasy but she has also written mystery stories, science fiction, family dramas and non-fiction. Her first adult series, the Castings Trilogy (Blood Ties, Deep Water and Full Circle) is published globally by Orbit Books. She is best known in Australia for the junior novel Victor’s Quest and an associated series, the Floramonde books, and for The Black Dress: Mary MacKillop’s Early Years, which won the NSW Premier's History Prize in 2006.

== Biography ==
Freeman was born in Sydney, Australia and grew up near Parramatta. She attended the University of Technology, Sydney from 1978 to 1980 and graduated with a Bachelor of Arts in Communications, majoring in film and television and psychology. After working in public relations in the petroleum exploration and engineering fields, she left Australia for London and spent some time there working in a variety of jobs, including a stint as a clerk for the scenery construction department of the BBC. She returned to Australia in 1984 and worked as a scriptwriter for the Powerhouse Museum in Sydney, moving from there to ABC TV's Children's and Education Department in 1987. She was researcher and scriptwriter on a number of the department's programs and first wrote prose stories for children for the series Watch! Your Language. Her first children's stories were published in the NSW School Magazine and one of these became the last chapter of her first book, The Willow Tree’s Daughter.

After leaving the ABC in late 1989, Freeman began work as a consultant in organisational communications, educational designer and trainer. She also completed a Master's degree in writing at the University of Technology, Sydney in 1996. Freeman developed a speciality in the area of corruption prevention in law enforcement, particularly the support of 'internal witnesses' (people who come forward to report misconduct or corruption). She was awarded a Churchill Fellowship in 1998 to study this issue in North America.

After the birth of her son in 2001, Freeman concentrated on writing and took the opportunity to complete a doctorate in creative arts at UTS. Debra Adelaide, author of The Household Guide to Dying, was her supervisor. Her thesis, Blood Ties, was her first book for adults, and is Book 1 in the Castings Trilogy, published globally by Orbit Books.

Victor's Challenge, a sequel to Victor's Quest, won the 2009 Aurealis Award for Best Children s Short Fiction/Illustrated Work/Picture Book and was a Notable Book in the Younger Readers Category, Children's Book Council of Australia Awards, 2010.

Freeman re-wrote stories from her first book, The Willow Tree's Daughter, to be suitable for much younger children. Princess Betony and the Unicorn (2012), Princess Betony and the Thunder Egg (2013) and Princess Betony and the Rule of Wishing (20103) were published in small hardback gift format by Walker Books Australia. In 2015, her non-fiction title Mary's Australia, about Australia in the time of Saint Mary Mackillop, was shortlisted for the Eve Pownall Award by the Children's Book Council of Australia.

In 2017, Freeman collaborated with Liz Anelli (illustrator) on Desert Lake: The story of Kati-Thanda-Lake Eyre, which became her most critically successful book, winning the ASO Librarian's choice award, being Highly Commended in the Australian Publishing Industry Awards, and being shortlisted for multiple other awards. The collaboration continues in a series of books about remarkable Australian landscapes, starting with Dry to Dry: The story of Kakadu.

In 2015, Freeman published a historical novel for adults, The Soldier's Wife, under the pen name Pamela Hart. (Hart is Freeman's husband's surname.) The novel draws on family stories of her grandfather's service in WWI and tells the story of a young woman living and working in a timber yard in Sydney while her husband of just a few weeks serves in the Gallipoli campaign. A companion novel, The War Bride, set in Sydney in the years after the war ends, published in 2017. A Letter from Italy is set in Italy during 1917, and features a woman war correspondent. It is based on the real-life story of Louise Mack, an Australian woman who was the first woman war correspondent. The Desert Nurse, published in 2018, tells the story of WWI in the Middle East through the lives of a nurse and doctor who volunteer to serve there. Pamela Hart books are published by Hachette Australia and Piatkus Books in the UK.

Freeman is Director of Creative Writing at the Australian Writer's Centre.

Freeman lives in Sydney with her husband and son.

== Awards and nominations ==
- 1994 — The Willow Tree's Daughter : Shortlisted for the NSW State Literary Awards
- 1997 — Victor's Quest : Shortlisted for Children's Book Council Book of the Year for Younger Readers
- 2001 — Pole to Pole : Shortlisted for the Children's Books Council Book of the Year Eve Pownall Award
- 2004 — Scum of the Earth : Winner of the Wilderness Society Environment Award for Children's Literature
- 2006 — The Black Dress : NSW Premier's History Prize
- 2011 — Ember and Ash : Winner of the Aurealis Award for best fantasy novel
- 2015 — Mary's Australia: Shortlisted for the Children's Books Council Book of the Year Eve Pownall Award
- 2017 — The War Bride: Shortlisted for Romantic Novel of the Year, Epic, (RONA, UK) and Romantic Book of the Year, Long-form (RUBY, Australia)
- 2017 — Desert Lake: The Story of Kati-Thanda-Lake Eyre (Illustrated by Liz Anelli): Winner of the ASO Librarian's Choice Award, Highly Commended in Australian Publishing Industry Awards, and shortlisted in four other awards
- 2021 — Dry to Dry: The Seasons of Kakadu: Shortlisted for the Children's Books Council Book of the Year Eve Pownall Award

== Bibliography ==
=== Adults ===
- 2007 Blood Ties, Book 1 of the Castings Trilogy, Orbit Books, 2007, Sydney, 2008, London, New York.
- 2008 Deep Water, Book 2 of the Castings Trilogy, Orbit Books, 2008, Sydney London, New York.
- 2009 Full Circle, Book 3 of the Castings Trilogy, Orbit Books, 2009, Sydney London, New York.
- 2010 The Castings Trilogy, Orbit Books, 2010, Sydney, London, New York.
- 2011 Ember and Ash, Orbit Books, 2011, Sydney, London, New York.

As Pamela Hart:

- 2015 The Soldier's Wife, Hachette Australia/Piatkus Books UK, Sydney, London
- 2016 The War Bride, Hachette Australia/Piatkus Books UK, Sydney, London
- 2017 A Letter from Italy, Hachette Australia/Piatkus Books UK, Sydney, London
- 2018 The Desert Nurse, Hachette Australia/Piatkus Books UK, Sydney, London

=== Young adult ===
- 2005 Chronicles of Quentaris: The Murderers' Apprentice, Lothian Books, Melbourne.
- 2006 The Black Dress, Black Dog Books, Melbourne.

=== The Floramonde books ===
- 1994 The Willow Tree's Daughter, Little Ark Books, Allen & Unwin, Melbourne.
- 1995 Windrider, Little Ark Books, Allen & Unwin, Melbourne.
- 1996 Victor's Quest, illustrated by Kim Gamble, Omnibus Books, Adelaide; re-released by Walker Books, Australia and UK, 2008
- 1998 The Centre of Magic, Allen & Unwin, Melbourne
- 2008 Victor's Challenge, Walker Books, Australia and UK

=== The Tiger Bay mysteries ===
- 2003 Hair of the Skeleton, Koala Books, Sydney.
- 2003 Scum of the Earth, Koala Books, Sydney.
- 2003 Trick of the Light, Koala Books, Sydney.

=== Standalone children's books ===
- 1997 Nanna, illustrated by Greg Somers, Koala Books, Sydney.
- 2001 Make Me the Flowergirl!, Omnibus Books, Scholastic Australia, Adelaide. Reprinted 2007, 2008.
- 2002 The Wonder Dog, Koala Books, Sydney.
- 2003 Shipborn, Koala Books, Sydney.
- 2013 Lollylegs, Walker Books Australia, Sydney

=== Picture books ===
- 2000 Cherryblossom and the Golden Bear, illustrated by Beth Norling, Omnibus Books, Scholastic Australia, Adelaide.

=== Non-fiction ===
- 1995 All for Love!, one of the True Stories series, Little Ark Books, Allen & Unwin, Melbourne
- 2000 Pole to Pole, illustrated by Philip Blythe, Koala Books, Sydney.
- 2006 Fire to Life, illustrated by Philip Blythe, Koala Books, Sydney.
- 2015 Mary's Australia, Black Dog Books, Melbourne
- 2017 Desert Lake: The story of Kati Thanda-Lake Eyre, illustrated by Liz Anelli, Walker Books Australia, Sydney.
- 2020 Dry to Dry: The Seasons of Kakadu, illustrated by Liz Anelli, Walker Books Australia, Sydney
