= Cameron Rogers =

Cameron Rogers may refer to:

- Cameron Rogers (writer)
- Cameron Rogers (cyclist)
