= Whispers of the Mist Children =

- Short story by Trudi Canavan
- Country: Australia
- Language: English
- Genre: Fantasy

Publication
- Published in: Aurealis #23
- Publication type: Periodical
- Publisher: Chimaera Publications
- Media type: Print (Magazine)
- Publication date: April 1999

"Whispers of the Mist Children" is a 1999 fantasy short story by Australian writer Trudi Canavan.

"Whispers of the Mist Children" was first published in Australia, in April 1999, in the twenty-third edition of the Aurealis magazine by Chimaera Publications. It was published alongside six other stories by the authors Robert Hood, Cameron Fade Gurr, Rjurik Davidson, Alistair Ong, Anthony Fordham, and Helen Sargeant. "Whispers of the Mist Children" won the 1999 Aurealis Award for best fantasy short story.
