= Hoa Pham =

Australian author of Vietnamese descent

- Born: Hobart, Australia
- Occupation: Author
- Writing career
- Period: 1994–present
- Website: hoapham.net

Hoa Pham is an Australian author of Vietnamese descent.

== Biography ==
Pham was born in Hobart after her parents arrived there during the 1970s to study. She lives in Melbourne. Pham's most recent novel is 'Empathy', published in 2022. Her novel The Other Shore was a co-winner of Seizure's Viva la Novella 2 competition. Her first novel, Vixen led her to win the 2001 Sydney Morning Herald's Young Writer of the Year award. Vixen also was a finalist for the 2000 Aurealis Award for best fantasy novel but lost to Juliet Marillier's Son of the Shadows. She was the founding editor of Peril, an online journal for Asian Australians.

== Bibliography ==
=== Novels ===
- Quicksilver (1998)
- Vixen (2000)
- The Other Shore (2014)
- Wave (2015)
- Lady of the Realm (2017)
- Empathy (2022)
- Miss Indochine- the last empress of Vietnam (2026)

=== Children's books ===
- No-one Like Me (1998)
- 49 Ghosts (1998)

=== Short stories ===
- "Reality" (1994) in Aurealis #13, (ed. Stephen Higgins, Dirk Strasser)
- "On the Continent" (1998) in Aurealis #20/21 (ed. Stephen Higgins, Dirk Strasser)
- Yolk (2007)
- Heroic Mother (2008)
- Immolation
- Mara

=== Plays ===
- Silence (2008–2010): about the secrets and spirits that haunt us from within. A family reunited by a death anniversary have to face the possessiveness of history and put the past to rest. Silence is on the Victorian Certificate of Education list for drama in 2010. Silence was presented at [La Mama Theatre (Melbourne)] in 2008, 2009 and 2010.
- I could be you (2009–2010): a short ten-minute play in the Melburnalia 2 series in 2009, and will be expanded into a full-length play for the Melbourne Fringe Festival in 2010.
- The Story of Chi (2024): co written with Jeremy Nguyen and Hiroki Kobayashi, produced by Terrapin puppetry company was awarded Best Children's Theatre Work by the AWGIE Awards
