= Cairo Jim =

Children's books series by Geoffrey McSkimming

- Author: Geoffrey McSkimming
- Language: English
- No. of books: 20

Cairo Jim is a popular series of children's books by author Geoffrey McSkimming. They have been described as "epic" and "imaginatively written", and compared to the Boy's Own Paper and the works of Agatha Christie.

There are currently 20 books in the series. Additionally published is Cairo Jim's Bumper Book of Flabbergasting Fragments, a book of poems, short stories and puzzles for fans of the series. The Cairo Jim and Jocelyn Osgood books are published in many different languages in the United Kingdom, Australia, Japan, Korea, Germany, Italy, Portugal, Poland, Russia, Hungary, and New Zealand.

Commencing in 2016, all titles in the Cairo Jim chronicles have been republished and e-published by 9 Diamonds Press.

== Characters ==
- Cairo Jim – The protagonist of the series, Cairo Jim is a well known archaeologist and little known poet. He lives in the fictional Valley of the Hairdressers in Cairo, along with his faithful animal companions Doris the talking macaw and Brenda the wonder camel. He is fond of wearing special desert sun spectacles and a pith helmet.
- Brenda the Wonder Camel - A camel from the Wonder Herd of Thebes, who possesses a remarkably broad knowledge of the world since accidentally swallowing a collection of encyclopedias as a calf. A long-time friend of Jim's, she is an aficionado of the Melodious Tex adventure novels.
- Doris - Doris the macaw originally met Jim in Peru (see Cairo Jim on the Trail to ChaCha Muchos) and has been his travelling companion ever since. She can speak English, is an expert in ancient languages, and enjoys quoting the works of Shakespeare.
- Captain Neptune Flannelbottom Bone - The primary villain of the series, Bone is a former friend of Jim's, having attended archaeology school with him. He seeks to exploit the treasures and secrets of antiquity for his own gain, and is obsessed by plans of wealth, power, world domination and immortality. He is described as an overweight man with a neatly clipped moustache and beard, who is fond of wearing waistcoats, plus fours, spats and fezzes in various garish and clashing colours. He takes extreme pride in his finely manicured fingernails.
- Desdemona - A red-eyed, flea-ridden talking raven and an accomplice to most of Bone's dastardly plots.
- Jocelyn Osgood - A flight attendant with Valkyrian Airways, she is described as a "'good friend' of Cairo Jim" and occasionally helps him on his adventures. She also has a pilot's licence.

== List of books ==
1. Cairo Jim on the Trail to ChaCha Muchos
2. Cairo Jim & Doris in Search of Martenarten
3. Jocelyn Osgood - After the Puce Empress
4. Cairo Jim and the Sunken Sarcophagus of Sekheret
5. Jocelyn Osgood and the Xylophones above Zarundi
6. Cairo Jim and the Alabastron of Forgotten Gods
7. Cairo Jim and the Quest for the Quetzal Queen
8. Jocelyn Osgood in Ascent into Asgard
9. Cairo Jim and the Secret Sepulchre of the Sphinx
10. Cairo Jim Amidst the Petticoats of Artemis
11. Cairo Jim and the Lagoon of Tidal Magnificence
12. Cairo Jim and the Tyrannical Bauble of Tiberius
13. Cairo Jim and the Chaos from Crete
14. Cairo Jim and the Rorting of Rameses' Regalia
15. Cairo Jim and Jocelyn Osgood in Bedlam from Bollywood
16. Cairo Jim and the Sumptuous Stash of Silenus
17. Cairo Jim at the Crossroads of Orpheus
18. Cairo Jim and the Astragals of Angkor
19. Cairo Jim and the Portal of Peristophanes: the Return of Cairo Jim
