= Trudi Canavan =

Australian writer of fantasy novels

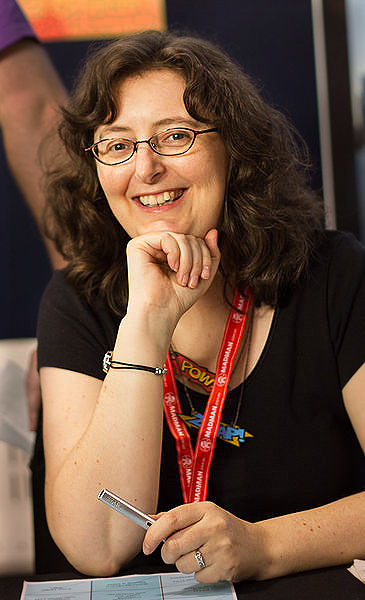
- Born: 23 October 1969; Melbourne, Australia
- Occupation: Writer
- Works: Millennium’s Rule Series; The Black Magician Trilogy; Age of the Five; The Traitor Spy
- Awards: Aurealis Award for best fantasy short story (1999); Aurealis Award for best fantasy novel (2009)
- Website: www.trudicanavan.com

Trudi Canavan (born 23 October 1969) is an Australian writer of fantasy novels, best known for her best-selling fantasy trilogies The Black Magician and Age of the Five. While establishing her writing career she worked as a graphic designer. She completed her third trilogy, The Traitor Spy trilogy, in August 2012 with The Traitor Queen. Subsequently, Canavan has written a series called Millennium's Rule, with a completely new setting consisting of multiple worlds which characters can cross between. Though originally planned as a trilogy, a fourth and final book in the Millennium's Rule series was published.

== Biography ==
Canavan was born in Kew, in Melbourne, Australia and grew up in the suburb of Ferntree Gully. From early in her childhood she was creative and interested in art, writing and music. After deciding to become a professional artist she completed an Advanced Certificate in Promotional Display at the Melbourne College of Decoration, where she received an award for Highest Aggregate Mark in Art Subjects in 1988.

In 1995 Canavan started The Telltale Art, a freelance business specialising on graphical design services. In that same year she began working for Aurealis, a magazine of Australian Fantasy and Science Fiction, working a do-it-all job as art and cover editor, reading manuscripts, creating web pages and stuffing envelopes. By taking on this job she was able to start writing in her spare time. Canavan states that until the age of 25 she dreamed of writing a novel but lacked the focus to do so. When she turned 25 she took several writing courses, worked on refining her fiction writing skills, while she fought her way through several rejections.

In 1999, Canavan's writing career took off when she won the Aurealis Award for Best Fantasy Short Story with Whispers of the Mist Children. In 2001, she further established herself with The Magicians' Guild, centring on Sonea, a slum child who is hunted for her rogue magic. The novel, which was the first of three books of The Black Magician Trilogy, brought her widespread acclaim, and the second book of the trilogy, The Novice (2002), was nominated for the Aurealis Award for Best Fantasy Novel. The third book, The High Lord, was released in December 2002 and was nominated for the Best Novel Ditmar category. All three books entered Australian top ten SF best-seller lists. The trilogy is now rated by Nielsen BookScan as the most successful debut fantasy series of the last 10 years, and in 2006 had sold over 275,000 copies in all editions. The trilogy has been translated into German, Dutch, Italian, Polish, Portuguese, Czech, Danish, Spanish and French.

Canavan's second trilogy, Age of the Five, was also well received by her readers. The first in the series, Priestess of the White reached No.3 in the Sunday Times hardback fiction best-seller list, staying in the top ten for 6 weeks. In early 2006, Canavan signed a seven-figure contract with Orbit to write the prequel and sequel to The Black Magician Trilogy. This book, The Magician's Apprentice, was released in February 2009.

Canavan's third trilogy, The Traitor Spy trilogy, is a sequel to the Black Magician Trilogy. The first book, The Ambassador's Mission, was published on 6 May 2010. The trilogy was completed in 2012.

=== On writing ===
Canavan states that "the best way to improve your writing is to write. A lot." In the "FAQ" section of her web page, she says that she does not specifically base her characters on herself or anybody else in real life. Asked about her habit of inventing new names for staples of real-world life (e.g. "bol" for spirits, "ceryni" for rat), she explains that the animals that inhabit her world are not the same as those of ours, but are bound to be similar when filling the same ecological niches as real world animals. In contrast to other fantasy/science fiction authors, Canavan is also appreciative of fan fiction.

== Awards ==
- Canavan's artwork in Aurealis and Eidolon – Australian science fiction and fantasy magazines – was nominated for a Ditmar Award for "Best Professional Artwork" in 1996.
- "Whispers of the Mist Children" won an Aurealis Award for "Best Fantasy Short Story" of 1999.
- The Novice was shortlisted for an Aurealis Award for "Best Fantasy Novel" of 2002.
- At the 2003 Ditmars, Canavan won the "Best Short Story" award with "Room for Improvement", published in Foreign Shores; The High Lord was nominated for "Best Novel" and her cover for Fables & Reflections 5 was nominated for the "Best Professional Artwork" award.
- The Magician's Apprentice (AUS / UK / US) has won the 2009 Aurealis Award for Best Fantasy Novel.

== Bibliography ==
=== Kyralia series ===
- The Magician's Apprentice (2009) (prequel stand-alone novel to the Black Magician Trilogy)
- The Black Magician Trilogy

- The Magicians' Guild (2001)
- The Novice (2002)
- The High Lord (2003)

- The Traitor Spy Trilogy (sequel to the Black Magician Trilogy)

- The Ambassador's Mission (2010)
- The Rogue (2011)
- The Traitor Queen (2012)

=== Ithania series ===
- The Age of the Five Trilogy

- Priestess of the White (2005)
- Last of the Wilds (2006)
- Voice of the Gods (2006)

=== Millennium's Rule ===
- Millennium's Rule Series

- Thief's Magic (2014)
- Angel of Storms (2015)
- Successor's Promise (2017)
- Maker's Curse (2020)

=== Short stories ===
- "Whispers of the Mist Children" (1999) in Aurealis No. 23 (ed. Dirk Strasser, Stephen Higgins)
- "Room for Improvement"
- "The Mad Apprentice"
- "Doctor Who: Salt of the Earth (Time Trips)"
- "Camp Followers" in Fearsome Journeys
