= The Last Wizard =

1995 novel by Tony Shillitoe

- The Last Wizard first edition cover.
- Author: Tony Shillitoe
- Cover artist: Otto & Chris
- Language: English
- Genre: Fantasy
- Publisher: Pan Macmillan
- Publication date: 1995
- Publication place: Australia
- Media type: Print (Paperback)
- Pages: 436 pp (first edition)
- ISBN: 0-330-35600-3

The Last Wizard is a 1995 fantasy novel by Tony Shillitoe. It follows the story of Tamesan who lives in a land where Wizards have been outlawed. Rejecting the way of the other women Tamesan chooses to study the art of healing and discovers the secret behind Dragon Mountain.

== Background ==
The Last Wizard was first published in Australia in 1995 by Pan Macmillan in paperback format. It was a short-list nominee for the 1995 Aurealis Award for best fantasy novel but lost to Garth Nix's Sabriel.

The central character was created as a homage by Shillitoe to his daughters to remind them that socio-gender stereotyping is worth challenging. The Last Wizard, despite being long out of print, is still used as a text in schools.

== Synopsis ==
Essentially a 'coming of age' teenage novel, The Last Wizard follows the efforts of Tam, daughter of the village Head, to establish her own place in the world while unravelling the dark secrets of her village culture.
