= Jo Spurrier =

Australian author of fantasy novels (born 1980)

Jo Spurrier (born 1980) is an Australian author of fantasy novels.

== Career ==
Spurrier has authored a trilogy of epic fantasy novels, Children of the Black Sun, which follow a young woman with magical talent, Sierra, in what Spurrier describes as a "fantasy version of Siberia" riven by tribal warfare and foreign incursions. The film rights for the series were optioned by Volare Pictures in 2013.

Her first novel, Winter Be My Shield, was nominated for the 2012 Aurealis Award for best fantasy novel. Spurrier was also nominated for the 2014 Ditmar Award for best new talent.

== Personal life ==
Spurrier has a Bachelor of Science degree and lives in Adelaide, South Australia.

== Works ==
Spurrier's novels have not yet been published outside Australia.

Children of the Black Sun trilogy

1. Winter Be My Shield, HarperVoyager, June 2012, ISBN 978-0732292539
2. Black Sun Light My Way, HarperVoyager, June 2013, ISBN 978-0732292553
3. North Star Guide Me Home, HarperVoyager, April 2014, ISBN 978-0732292560

Tales of the Blackbone Witches series

1. A Curse of Ash and Embers, HarperVoyager, September 2018, ISBN 978-1460710319
2. Daughter of Lies and Ruin, HarperVoyager, October 2019, ISBN 978-1460710326
