= Fallen Moon (manga) =

Japanese manga anthology

堕天の月 (Daten no Tsuki)
- Genre: Yaoi, Historical Fiction
- Manga
- Written by: Toui Hasumi
- Published by: Biblos (original); Gentosha (reprint)
- English publisher: NA: Blu Manga
- Published: April 5, 2004

Fallen Moon (堕天の月, Daten no Tsuki) is a stand-alone collection of short stories by manga artist Toui Hasumi. It is published by Blu Manga in America, the shōnen-ai and yaoi publishing division of Tokyopop.

== Description ==
An angel loses his place in Eden only to find a mysterious and dangerous new patron... A poor painter finishes a woman's portrait without his subject... Two bounty hunters face mysterious demons in the night...

== Included stories ==
This manga is split into numerous stores.

- The first and titular story, Fallen Moon, is the story of an angel, Lucas, cast from Eden on presumed interaction with demons. No life is said to exist outside of Eden, and yet, upon his departure from Eden he is found by the mysterious Seraphis, Angel of Fire. And yet something about this Angel seems odd...
- The second story, Poirtrait of Memories, is a story of an artist who recently has been commissioned to paint portraits of numerous men's beautiful lovers. And yet a strange figure approaches him one day with an odd proposition: No model will be provided, only an intricate spoken description. Upon completion of the painting, the commissioner offers to be the patron of the artist, and yet the possible patron seems to know a little too much about the artist...
- The next few pages contain the short Princess Barbello's Depression, linking together a few characters from prior stories in an unexpected way.
- After a brief insertion of plain art, Garden of Thorns begins, following an ageless magic user, Navia, who is locked far away in a tower by a medieval king, used to foretell the future. However, that king is dead and his only heir, King Uricus, born of the old Kind and a concubine of another land. Unlike his father, Uricus does not keep the ageless magician locked away in the tower, instead transports him to the castle. And yet, something seems odd about the plans Uricus is unleashing to conquer the surrounding territories, though it is only Navia who notices...
- Following a few more art inserts, the Magic Cat of Hell's Hill begins. A maid for the Viscount Kuroe is attempting to locate her patron in his large manor stumbled across a bottomless hole to nowhere, from which comes a cat boy. She is frightened and yet it is not her master who had summoned him. The cat insists he's looking for a woman called Riifa, his former owner. (Notable, this is not a Shone-ai/yaoi work.)
- The final tale, Mosaic, is of demon hunters Serei and Rui. The only story with a vaguely contemporary setting, these two must kill demons to earn their rent. However, not everyone in this work is able to see Demons and so much controversy revolves around the idea that these two can. They fled to the city Diis, where there are more like them. And yet, Rui is plagued by a strange, recurring nightmare that leads to a disturbing revelation.
