= C. S. Pacat =

Australian author

C. S. Pacat is a New York Times and USA Today bestselling Australian author, best known for the Captive Prince trilogy, published by Penguin Random House in 2015.

== Early life ==
Pacat was born in Melbourne, Australia, and was educated at the University of Melbourne. She (Note: Pacat uses both she/her and he/him pronouns. This article uses feminine pronouns for consistency.) lived in several different cities including Perugia where she studied at Perugia University, and Tokyo, where she lived for five years. Pacat wrote the Captive Prince trilogy around her day job as a translator while training as a geologist.

== Literary career ==
Pacat's first novel Captive Prince began as an online serial of original "slash" fiction on LiveJournal, where it garnered viral attention. Self-published in February 2013, Captive Prince was then acquired by Penguin Random House, and published commercially in April 2015 in multiple territories. The sequel Prince's Gambit was released in July 2015, and the final novel in the trilogy Kings Rising was released in February 2016. The series was short-listed for the Sara Douglass Book Series Award, part of the Aurealis Awards.

In 2017 she revealed that she was working on a new comic series Fence, about the world of fencing. The series has since been expanded to include a series of novels by Sarah Rees Brennan and was nominated for a GLAAD award in 2019.

In 2019 she announced a new trilogy, Dark Rise, a young adult fantasy novel series. The first installment hit the New York Times bestsellers list in October 2021 and was awarded the 2021 Aurealis Award for Best Fantasy Novel.

== Personal life ==
Pacat is queer and genderqueer, using both she/her and he/him pronouns. She identifies as "a proud wog". and states that this played an influence while writing the Captive Prince trilogy: "As for the influence on Captive Prince, I'm a bisexual wog, and Damen is a bisexual wog - so there's that....There's a lot of wog-politics in the series, although its rarely read from that perspective outside of Australia".

== Bibliography ==
=== Captive Prince trilogy ===
- Captive Prince (7 April 2015)
- Prince's Gambit (7 July 2015)
- Kings Rising (2 February 2016)

The fantasy series centres around a romance between two princes of rival countries. Damianos killed Laurent's beloved elder brother in battle when he was younger, but then he finds himself sent to Laurent's country to be his slave several years later, as a result of his own brother's plot for the throne.

==== Captive Prince short stories ====
- The Training of Erasmus (published only in the US print edition of Captive Prince)
- Green but for a Season (20 September 2016)
- The Summer Palace (5 January 2017)
- The Adventures of Charls, the Veretian Cloth Merchant (3 May 2017)
- Pet (6 January 2018)
- The Summer Palace and Other Stories: A Captive Prince Short Story Collection (20 October 2018 (Includes four of the short stories, excluding The Training of Erasmus)

==== Captive Prince bonus material ====
An extension of Prince's Gambit's chapter 19, entitled Chapter 19.5, is exclusively available in the US paperback edition.

=== Fence comic series ===
==== Issues ====
- Fence #1 (15 November 2017)
- Fence #2 (20 December 2017)
- Fence #3 (17 January 2018)
- Fence #4 (21 February 2018)
- Fence #5 (18 April 2018)
- Fence #6 (16 May 2018)
- Fence #7 (20 June 2018)
- Fence #8 (18 July 2018)
- Fence #9 (15 August 2018)
- Fence #10 (26 September 2018)
- Fence #11 (31 October 2018)
- Fence #12 (28 November 2018)
- Fence: Redemption #1 (7 June 2023)
- Fence: Redemption #2 (5 July 2023)
- Fence: Redemption #3 (2 August 2023)
- Fence: Redemption #4 (13 September 2023)
- Fence: Challengers #1: Long Shot (24 July 2024)
- Fence: Challengers #2: Sweet Sixteen (1 January 2025)
- Fence: BREAKTHROUGH #1: GAMECHANGER (30 July 2025)
- Fence: BREAKTHROUGH #2: QuarterClash (?? January 2026)

==== Collected editions ====
- Fence Vol. 1 (combines issues #1-4) (31 July 2018)
- Fence Vol. 2 (combines issues #5-8) (15 January 2019)
- Fence Vol. 3 (combines issues #9-12) (20 August 2019)

==== Graphic novels ====
- Fence Vol. 4 ("Rivals") (15 July 2020)
- Fence Vol. 5 ("Rise") (16 August 2022)
- Fence Vol. 6 ("Redemption") (16 January 2024)
- Fence Vol. 7 ("Challengers") (29 July 2025)

=== Dark Rise trilogy ===
- Dark Rise (September 2021)
- Dark Heir (November 2023)

=== DC Comics ===
- Dark Knights of Steel #1: Tales From The Three Kingdoms (September 2022)
- Nightwing Annual (November 2022)
- Lazarus Planet #1: Assault on Krypton
