= Jane Routley =

Australian writer of fantasy fiction (born 1962)

- Born: 1962 (age 63–64); Melbourne, Australia
- Writing career
- Genre: Fantasy fiction
- Notable awards: Aurealis Award; Fantasy division 1998 Fire Angels; 1999 Aramaya

Jane Routley is an Australian writer of fantasy fiction.

== Biography ==
Jane Routley was born in Melbourne, Australia. Her first book Mage Heart was released in the U.S. in 1996. It is the first book in the Mage Heart series. She has since released two more novels in the series. In 2000 all three novels were published in Australia. Dutch and German editions have also appeared. Jane had also published a novel The Three Sisters in the U.S. under the pseudonym Rebecca Locksley. She has written a number of short stories including a contribution to Paul Collins' Fantastic Worlds anthology with City of Whirlwinds. Fire Angels and Aramaya both won the Aurealis Award for best fantasy novel in 1998 and 1999 respectively. She is a recipient of the Aurealis Award for best fantasy novel.

== Bibliography ==
=== Fiction series ===
Dion Demonslayer

- Mage Heart (1996)
- Fire Angels (1998)
- Aramaya (1999)

Tari

- The Three Sisters (2004) (as Rebecca Locksley)
- The Melded Child (2018)

=== Standalone ===
- A Shining Knight (2017)
- Shadow in the Empire of Light (2017)

=== Short fiction ===
- "The Goddess Wakes" (1995) in She's Fantastical (ed. Lucy Sussex and Judith Buckrich)
- "The Empty Quarter" (1996) in Dream Weavers (ed. Paul Collins)
- "Stealing the Seed" (1997) in Eidolon, Issue 24, Autumn 1997 (ed. Jonathan Strahan, Jeremy G. Byrne, Richard Scriven)
- "To Avalon" (1998) in Dreaming Down-Under (ed. Jack Dann, Janeen Webb)
- "City of Whirlwinds" (1998) in Fantastic Worlds (ed. Paul Collins)
- "Liars Brooch" (2001) in Spinouts (ed. Paul Collins)
- "A New Creation" (2002) in Meanjin, Volume 61, Number 3 2002 (ed. Micheal McGirr)
- "Celia" (2007) in Cicada, Vol 10, No 2, Nov/Dec 2007 (ed. Marianne Carus)

== Awards and nominations ==
- 1999 Nominated for a Ditmar award for "To Avalon"
- 1998 Nominated for the Aurealis Award for Best Fantasy Short Story for "To Avalon"
- 1999 Aurealis Award for Best Fantasy Novel for Aramaya
- 1998 Aurealis Award for Best Fantasy Novel for Fire Angels
- 1989 Won the Moonee Valley Library Short Story Competition with the story "Red Roses"
