= Dave Luckett =

Australian children's writer (born 1951)

- Born: 1951 (age 74–75) Stanmore, New South Wales, Australia
- Occupation: Children's author; Writer
- Genre: Fantasy; Children's fiction; Non-fiction
- Notable works: A Dark Winter; Rhianna and the Wild Magic; School of Magic series
- Notable awards: Aurealis Award for Best Fantasy Novel (1998)

Dave Luckett (born 1951) is an Australian children's writer born in Stanmore, New South Wales. He has written three non-fiction books about cricket and medieval weapons and armour. He has also written three series of fantasy books as well as a number of standalone fantasy books. One of the series, The Rhianna Chronicles, has been reprinted in the United States and Poland. His A Dark Winter won the Aurealis Award for best fantasy novel in 1998.

== Bibliography ==
=== Children's fantasy ===
==== School of Magic ====
1. The Truth About Magic (2005)
2. The Return of Rathalorn (2005)

==== Tenabran Trilogy ====
1. A Dark Winter (1997)
2. A Dark Journey (1999)
3. A Dark Victory (1999)

==== The Rhianna Chronicle ====
1. Rhianna and the Wild Magic (2000) (US title The Girl, the Dragon, and the Wild Magic (2003))
2. Rhianna and the Dogs of Iron (2002) (US title: The Girl, the Apprentice, and the Dogs of Iron (2004))
3. Rhianna and the Castle of Avalon (2002) (US title: The Girl, the Queen, and the Castle (2004))

=== Standalone fiction books ===
- Jupiter Tonnens (1993)
- The Patternmaker (1994)
- The Adventures of Addam (1994)
- The Wizard and Me (1995)
- Night Hunters (1995)
- Switching Current (1996)
- Deals On Wheels (1996)
- The Best Batsman in the World (1996)
- The Last Eleven (1997)
- I am Cool (2000)
- City, Seen by Lightning (2003)
- Subversive Activity (2009)

=== Short fiction ===
- "Breeding season". Andromeda Spaceways Inflight Magazine. 32. 2008.
- "Runway to Heaven". Andromeda Spaceways Inflight Magazine. 41: 4–11. 2009.
- "History: Theory and Practice". Light Touch Paper, Stand Clear (2012)

=== Nonfiction ===
- Cricket Australia: Kids' Ultimate Fan's Handbook (2004)
- Iron Soldiers: A Story of Arms and Armour (2005)
- Howzat!: A Celebration of Cricket (2005) with (Max Fatchen)
