= Tony Shillitoe =

Australian fantasy writer (born 1955)

- Born: Anthony Bruce Shillitoe; 28 March 1955 (age 71); Tailem Bend, South Australia
- Occupations: Writer and Educator
- Spouse: Francesca Megen Stropin
- Children: Jaimee Shillitoe; Kim Shillitoe; Leah Stropin
- Writing career
- Period: 1992-present
- Genres: Fantasy, Young Adult, Historical Romance and Science Fiction
- Notable works: The Last Wizard (1995); Blood (2002); Caught in the Headlights (2003)
- Notable awards: shortlisted inaugural Aurealis Award (Best Fantasy Novel 1995) – The Last Wizard shortlisted Aurealis Award (Best Fantasy Novel 2002) – Blood: the First Ashuak Chronicle notable read CBC Children's Book of the Year for Older Readers (2003) – Caught in the Headlights
- Website: tonyshillitoe.com.au

Tony Shillitoe is an Australian fantasy writer.

Shillitoe's first novel, Guardians, was published in 1992 by Pan Macmillan. It was the first part of the Andrakis trilogy, soon followed by Kingmaker and Dragonlords in 1993. The trilogy was partially rewritten for the 2006 edition, and re-edited again for the 2024 release. In 1995, Shillitoe published a teenage fantasy, The Last Wizard, which was shortlisted in the inaugural Aurealis Awards for Best Fantasy Novel. Between 1996-1998, Shillitoe released several short stories and a play monologue published in various anthologies.

In 1999, Shillitoe published his first young adult novel, Joy Ride with Wakefield Press. Set in Adelaide in the mid-1990s, and inspired by a real news story in which two boys stole a bus and drove it up the South Eastern Freeway. The novel was popularly received by teenagers and young adults, but despised by most older readers, and did not receive positive publicity. It has been used in schools, and also in correctional institutions as a text for rehabilitating young males.

Shillitoe returned to the fantasy genre in 2002 when HarperCollins released Blood, the first book in the Ashuak Chronicles. Blood was also short-listed for Best Fantasy Novel in the Aurealis Awards in 2002. Passion and Freedom completed the Ashuak Chronicle trilogy in 2003.

2003 also saw the release of Shillitoe's second young adult novel, Caught in the Headlights, which was listed as a "Notable Book for Older Readers" by the Children's Book Council, and it has subsequently appeared on Premier's Reading Lists in South Australia, Victoria and New South Wales. In contrast with the previous novel Joy Ride, this novel espouses a more conventional moral attitude. Caught in the Headlights has been successful. It also reflects the author's zero tolerance for drugs, drawn from the experiences of several close friends who fell victim to drug use.

In 2006, Shillitoe released the first novel in a new fantasy series, the Dreaming in Amber quartet, published by HarperCollins. The second book, A Solitary Journey, was also released in 2006. Prisoner of Fate followed in June 2007 and the final book, The Demon Horsemen, was published in July 2008. Also in 2006, Shillitoe's agent and Altair Australia publisher, Robert N Stephenson, rebranded and republished the original Andrakis series as The Waking Dragon, A Maker of Kings and Dragonlord War in 2006 with cover artwork by Finnish artist, Kirsi Salonen. Altair also released Shillitoe's anthology of fantasy stories, Tales of the Dragon, in 2006.

In 2015, Shillitoe self-published the young adult novel, In My Father's Shadow. Set in South Australia, teenager Josh is confronted by a ghost on his Uncle's farm who leads him to unravelling a series of family mysteries, including a murder, his father's bisexuality, relationships with friends, and his own identity.

2016 saw Shillitoe publish a third teenage novel, The Need, which focuses on male obsessions with fast cars.

In 2024, Shillitoe self-published an historical romance, Girlie, based on his mother's life between the ages of 13-21. Set at the close of World War Two, and running through the post-war austerity years to 1953, the novel explores the challenges facing a young woman coming of age in Australia.

== Body of works ==
=== Andrakis Trilogy ===
- Guardians (The Waking Dragon) (Pan Macmillan 1992, Altair 2006, Amazon 2024)
- Kingmaker (The Maker of Kings) (Pan Macmillan 1993, Altair 2006, Amazon 2024)
- Dragon Lords (The Dragonlord War) (Pan Macmillan 1993, Altair 2006, Amazon 2024)

The Andrakis fantasy series follows the interwoven fates of the central characters, Andra – a warrior with a prophetic future, and A Ahmud Ki – a sorcerer determined to become a dragonlord. The Andrakis world and many of the characters originated from a host of Dungeons and Dragons style games that Shillitoe created and ran for several playing groups throughout the 1980s. The series enjoyed a run of success, although the third book struggled to make sales, perhaps because its unique cover design made it seem not to belong to the first two books.

=== The Ashuak Chronicles ===
- Blood (HarperCollins 2002, Amazon 2024)
- Passion (HarperCollins 2003, Amazon 2024)
- Freedom (HarperCollins 2003, Amazon 2024)

The central character of the series, Alwyn, is loosely based on Gandhi and Christ because the character tries to resolve the conflicts of his world through reason and passive resistance.

=== Dreaming in Amber ===
- The Amber Legacy (HarperCollins 2006, Amazon 2024)
- A Solitary Journey (HarperCollins 2006, Amazon 2024)
- Prisoner of Fate (HarperCollins 2007, Amazon 2024)
- The Demon Horsemen (HarperCollins 2008, Amazon 2024)

Book one, The Amber Legacy, focuses on the fate of Meg Farmer, a 16yo girl who discovers that she has inherited magical skill from her line of ancestors who are introduced in the Ashuak Chronicles and is the only person who can intervene in the impending doom facing her people.

The story follows Meg's life journey from age sixteen to her seventies as she is caught up in world-changing events despite her efforts to stay out of them. The series also brings back to life a key character from the original Andrakis series – A Ahmud Ki – who has a chance to redeem himself. All ten of Shillitoe's fantasy novels – the Andrakis trilogy, the Ashuak Chronicles trilogy, and the Dreaming in Amber quartet – are drawn together into a single saga by the Dreaming in Amber series.

=== The Last Wizard Saga ===
- The Last Wizard (Pan MacMillan 1995) (republished in 2025 as Tamesan)
- Chasse (Millswood Books 2025)
- Jaysin (Millswood Books 2025)
- Harmi (Millswood Books 2026)

=== Other novels ===
- Joy Ride (Wakefield Press1999)
- Caught in the Headlights (HarperCollins 2003)
- In My Father's Shadow (Amazon 2015)
- The Need (Amazon 2016)
- Girlie (Amazon 2024)
- All We Have (Millswood Books 2025)
- Mika (Millswood Books 2026)
- A Day in His Life (Millswood Books 2026)

=== Poetry ===
- Rearview Mirror: A retrospective anthology of poems (Amazon 2024)

=== Short stories ===
- "The Innkeeper" in Dream Weavers, 1996, ed. Paul Collins)
- "Jammin' in The Girl Who Married a Fly, 1997, ed. Michael Hyde)
- "The Book of Lore" in Fantastic Worlds, 1998, ed. Paul Collins)
- "The Lure" in Solo Spots, 1998, ed. Chris Tugwell and Ruth Starke)
- "Assassin" in Harbinger #2, 1999, ed.
- "Virtual God" in Altair #5 (ed. Robert N. Stephenson, Jim Deed & Andrew Collings)
- "The Mother Anger" in Altair #6 & 7, 2000, ed. Robert N. Stephenson, Jim Deed & Andrew Collings)
- "The Sculptor" in Altair #6 & 7, 2000, ed. Robert N. Stephenson, Jim Deed & Andrew Collings)
- "Hope" in From Out of the Darkness, 2015, ed. Robert N. Stephenson)
- Tales of the Dragon: a fantasy anthology (Altair 2006, Amazon 2024)
- The Red Heart: speculative Australian stories (Amazon 2016)

== Awards and nominations ==
=== Aurealis Awards ===
Fantasy division

- Finalist: The Last Wizard (1995)
- Finalist: Blood (2002)

Science fiction division

- Finalist: All We Have (2025)
