= Godspeaker =

Novel trilogy by Karen Miller

Godspeaker Trilogy
- Empress of Mijak The Riven Kingdom Hammer of God
- Author: Karen Miller
- Country: Australia
- Language: English
- Genre: Fantasy
- Publisher: HarperCollins
- Published: 2007
- Media type: Print (Paperback)
- No. of books: 3

Godspeaker is an adult trilogy of fantasy novels written by Australian author Karen Miller. The story is set in a theocratic world, fueled by politics and rivalry between two lands, Mijak and Ethrea.

The series follows the journey of a young slave girl named Hekat with a rare and mysterious power of hearing the gods as she rises to become one of the most powerful and feared leaders in the land.

As the trilogy progresses, Hekat's power and influence start to grow, and she becomes increasingly ruthless and single-minded in her pursuit of dominance. Hakat eventually comes to clash with the second protagonist of the series, queen Rhian of Ethrea.

The story explores themes of power, control and the role of religion in society.

== Series ==
Title	Year
Empress of Mijak	2007
The Riven Kingdom	2007
Hammer of God	2008

== Empress of Mijak ==
Empress of Mijak 1st edition cover art

Empress of Mijak (known as Empress in North America and the United Kingdom) is the first novel in this Godspeaker series, published in July 2007.

The first novel introduces the protagonist, Hekat, who grew up in a harsh desert wasteland unwanted by her impoverished family and her abusive father. She is sold to slave traders Abajai and Yagji. And she travels with them south of the land of Mijak, to reach the traders' home city of Et-Raklion where she flees her masters to serve the Warlord Raklion as a warrior. Hakat learns about powers and trains while she is in the service of the warlord. She starts social climbing to become the most powerful woman in the Majik empire.

=== Reviews ===
Empress of Mijtak received mixed reviews that pointed out both its strengths and its challenges for readers. Reviewers noted how different it is in tone from Miller's previous “Kingbreaker” duology, and praised the book's dark picture of Mijak as a brutal, blood filled violent society, and the way it shows religion shaping people's everyday lives. Many critics described Hekat's character as a hard to like main character since her journey starts from an abused likable slave, to a power lust ruthless leader as uncomfortable to follow. At the same time, some reviewers felt that the graphic violence, frequent swearing, as well as sexual content with sexual violation scenes, may be triggering for some. According to critics the writing style of the book contains a lot of repetitive ritual scenes, repetitive phrasing, and a lack of a clear hero made the long book tiring, and hard to “read it all at once” even though they still recommended Empress to readers who enjoy dark and detailed epic fantasy.

== The Riven Kingdom ==
The Riven Kingdom is the second novel in the series published in December 2007.

This book takes the story away from the land of Majik to the island kingdom of Ethrea. The king of Ethrea who has no male heirs is dying, his only daughter Rhian must find a way to prevent the kingdom from falling to war and chaos. Dexterity Jones, the toymaker, must work with an exile from Mijak to help Rhian as Ethrea comes ever closer to civil war.

== Hammer of God ==
Hammer of God was published in June 2008, as the third and concluding novel of the trilogy.

The story continues Queen Rhian's struggle to keep her throne and to face the threat of the Majik empire where Empress Hekat, who hears the voice of the god and believes she is commanded to conquer the known world. Queen Rhian, estranged from all her allies, must convince her counterparts of surrounding nations that Mijak is a very real threat. The story concludes with the final battle between Mijak and Ethrea.

=== Reviews ===
Hammer of God received mixed reviews, with critics praising the epic conclusion and at the same time criticising its length and rhythm. Reviewers noted that the novel successfully expresses the ongoing conflict between Mijak and Ethrea, highlighting how prophecies, faith, and family tensions shape the final confrontation between Zandakar, his relatives, and Queen Rhian. At the same time, noting the book feels longer than necessary, with relationship conflicts and political negotiations in the same cycle with repetitive, both prose and style patterns from earlier in the trilogy, which made the story seem to circle around the same issues before reaching the final battle. Review also referred to the fact that characters feature similar types of anger and arguments. Despite these remarks, reviewers described the ending itself as one that provides a logical conclusion that “makes sense” and provides a good close to the Godspeaker trilogy.
