= The Dark Griffin =

2009 fantasy novel

- First edition
- Author: K.J. Taylor
- Cover artist: Allison Jones
- Language: English
- Genre: Fantasy
- Publisher: HarperVoyager, HarperCollinsPublishers
- Publication date: 1 August 2009
- Publication place: Australia
- Media type: Print ()
- Pages: 528
- ISBN: 978-0-7322-8852-5
- Followed by: The Griffin's Flight

The Dark Griffin is a 2009 fantasy novel by K.J. Taylor, the first in the Fallen Moon series, followed by The Griffin's Flight.

== Critical reception ==
The novel was nominated for the 2009 Aurealis Award for best fantasy novel.
