= Aramaya (novel) =

1999 novel by Jane Routley

- Aramaya first edition cover.
- Author: Jane Routley
- Cover artist: Donato Giancola
- Language: English
- Genre: Fantasy
- Publisher: Avon Eos
- Publication date: 8 June 1999
- Publication place: Australia
- Media type: Print (Paperback)
- Pages: 278 pp (first edition)
- ISBN: 978-0-380-79428-7
- Preceded by: Fire Angels

Aramaya is a 1999 fantasy novel by Jane Routley. It follows the second book in the series, Fire Angels, with Dion arriving in the capitol of Akieva in search of her missing niece.

== Background ==
Aramaya was first published in the United States on 8 June 1999 by Avon Eos in trade paperback format. It was released in the United States and Australia in mass market paperback format in June 2000 and October 2000 respectively. Aramaya won the 1999 Aurealis Award for best fantasy novel and was a short-list nominee for the 2000 Ditmar Award for best novel.
