= The Innocent Mage =

2005 novel by Karen Miller

- The Innocent Mage first edition cover.
- Author: Karen Miller
- Language: English
- Series: Kingmaker, Kingbreaker
- Genre: Fantasy novel
- Publisher: HarperCollins
- Publication date: 2005-07-25
- Publication place: Australia
- Media type: Print (Paperback)
- Pages: 560 pp (first edition)
- ISBN: 0-7322-8079-6
- OCLC: 224733026
- Followed by: The Awakened Mage

The Innocent Mage is the first book in the Kingmaker, Kingbreaker fantasy series written by Australian author Karen Miller.

== Plot introduction ==
Asher of Restharven wishes to own his own boat so that he may get away from his six brothers and spend time with his father. He goes seeking fortune in Dorana and ends up in service of the young Prince Gar. Unknown to the both of them a secret organization called "the Circle" is watching Asher for he is the one foretold in the prophecy to save the kingdom.

== Plot summary ==
The Doranen have ruled Lur with magic after fleeing the evil Morg who took over their homeland. For an Olken (Lur's original inhabitants) it is unlawful to use magic. Any Olken who breaks the law will be executed.

Asher has come to Lur's capital city to make his fortune. He begins as a worker in the stables of the Royal Palace but is soon made an assistant to the magicless Prince Gar, who is the mediator between the Olken and the Doranen. Soon, he hopes to gain enough money to buy a boat and fish with his father for the rest of his life.

But unrest starts to show among the Olken. It has been prophesied that the Innocent Mage will be born, and the Circle is dedicated to preserving the magic of the Olken until the saviour arrives. The Circle have been watching Asher, and as the city streets are filled with Olken rioters, his life takes a bitter turn.
