= Cameron Rogers (writer) =

Australian writer of speculative fiction (born 1972)

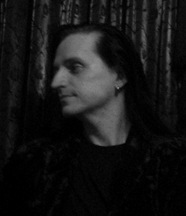
- Cameron Rogers in 2007
- Born: Cairns, Queensland, Australia
- Writing career
- Pen name: Rowley Monkfish
- Genre: Speculative fiction
- Website: www.camrogers.net

Cameron Rogers is an Australian writer of speculative fiction.

== Biography ==
Rogers was born in Cairns, Queensland, Australia. His first work to be published was a young adult novel, entitled The Vampires which he collaborated with Anthony Short who provided the illustrations. The Vampires is the twenty first book in the After Dark which was originally started in 1991 by Gary Crew.

In 2001 Rogers released his novel The Music of Razors which was published by Penguin Books in Australia and by Del Rey Books in the United States. The Music of Razors was nominated for three awards at the 2001 Aurealis Awards – fantasy, horror, and young-adult categories however lost all three. In 2005 Rodgers released Nicholas and the Chronoporter as under the name Rowley Monkfish which is part of the Aussie Chomps series. and in 2007 The Music of Razors was released in the United States by Random House as an uncorrected proofs edition which featured an additional 40,000 words than the original release.

Rogers' book Quantum Break: Zero State was published in 2016.

Rogers previously worked as lead writer for Warframe where he created and wrote for characters like Ticker, among others.

== Bibliography ==
- The Vampires (1997, part of the After Dark series)
- The Music of Razors (2001)
- Nicholas and the Chronoporter (2005, as Rowley Monkfish, part of the Aussie Chomps series)
- Quantum Break: Zero State (2016)

Source: ISFDB, cameron-rogers.com

== Nominations ==
- The Music of Razors
  - Nomination: 2002 Aurealis Award for best fantasy novel
  - Nomination: 2002 Aurealis Award for best horror novel
  - Nomination: 2002 Aurealis Award for best young-adult novel
