= Sylvia Kelso =

Australian writer

- Born: North Queensland
- Occupations: Lecturer, English Literature
- Writing career
- Genres: Fantasy, Science Fiction
- Website: kelsowrite.blogspot.com

Sylvia Kelso is an author of both fantasy and science fiction, usually set in analogue or outright Australian landscapes. She has a Creative Writing MA built around one science-fiction novel using alternate North Queenslands and she earned her Ph.D. in 1997.

Kelso's novels are densely descriptive, the worlds complex and minutely constructed, the environments, lush or bleak, brought alive with poetic force.

Her critical interests cover: Feminist Theory and History, Gothic and Horror Fiction, Science Fiction and Fantasy, and Women's Writing.

There are some stylistic similarities to the works of Patricia A. McKillip.

== Bibliography ==
=== Novels ===
- The Rihannar Chronicles, Book 1: Everran's Bane [2005]
- The Rihannar Chronicles, Book 2: The Moving Water [2007]
- The Rihannar Chronicles, Book 3: The Red Country [2008]
- Amberlight [October 2007]
- Riversend [sequel to Amberlight, 2009]
- Source [2010]

=== Blackston Gold ===
- The Solitaire Ghost [June 2011]
- The Time Seam [November 2011]

=== Non-fiction ===
- Three Observations and a Dialogue Round and About SF [Aqueduct Press, May 2009]
