= The Magicians' Guild =

2001 Book by Trudi Canavan

- First edition cover
- Author: Trudi Canavan
- Cover artist: Steve Stone
- Language: English
- Series: The Black Magician series
- Genre: Fantasy novel
- Publisher: Orbit Books
- Publication date: 2001
- Publication place: Australia
- Media type: Print (Hardback & Paperback)
- Pages: 469 pp (UK edition)
- ISBN: 1-84149-313-9 (first edition, paperback) & ISBN 1-904233-66-X (hardback edition)
- OCLC: 53391710
- Followed by: The Novice

The Magicians' Guild is the first fantasy novel in The Black Magician series by Trudi Canavan. Published in 2001, it is followed by The Novice (2002) and The High Lord (2003).

The book tells the story of Sonea, a young girl from the slums, as she discovers her magical potential. When she hurls a stone through a magical barrier, accidentally injuring a magician behind it, Sonea finds herself on the run from the powerful Magicians' Guild. The magicians must find her before her uncontrolled and untrained powers kill her and destroy the city, as well as overcome Sonea's distrust and fear of the magicians and their Guild as they try to convince her to join their ranks.

== Plot ==
Each winter in Imardin, the capital city of Kyralia, the streets are purged of the "dwells", the city's poor under-class, by magicians who drive away the inhabitants of the city's slums. Although young gang members gather to throw rocks at them, the magicians are protected by a magical shield—until Sonea, a young dwell, hurls a rock through their barrier and injures the magician Lord Fergun.

Fearing a rogue magician, the Guild begins searching for Sonea. Lords Dannyl and Rothen lead the search into the slums, worried that Sonea's increasingly uncontrolled magic will harm her and those around her. But Sonea both distrusts the Guild for their apparent lack of compassion for the poor dwells and fears their reprisal for her accidental injury of Lord Fergun. She flees with her friend Cery, eventually seeking the aid of the shady Thieves, who see the value of having their own magician and take her under their care. With Cery, she sneaks into the Magician's Guild in an attempt to gain knowledge of how to control her magic, and observes a black-robed magician covered in blood performing a strange rite on a servant. However, her attempt to learn more is unsuccessful, and Sonea continues to lose control of her powers, setting fire to her surroundings repeatedly, before Lord Rothen at last locates her.

At the magician's Guild, Lord Rothen and the sinister Fergun fight for Sonea's mentorship, though she is uninterested in training and only wants to return home to her friends and family. Lord Fergun attempts to sway Sonea to betray the Guild and thus prove that dwells are not fit to enter the Guild and goes so far as to kidnap and threaten Cery, but Fergun's plans are discovered and he is made to stand trial. In order to prove Fergun's guilt, Sonea submits to a mental examination, or 'truthreading', by Administrator Lorlen, who, finding the memory of the black-robed magician, reveals the man to be Lord Akkarin, head of the guild, explaining that she saw him practising black magic which is forbidden in Kyralia. Sonea decides then to join the Guild and train her magical potential. The next scene is the epilogue in which Lord Rothen is teaching her to create a globe light as used by magicians earlier in the books; he then questions what made her change her mind and stay, to which she replies that there is something that administrator Lorlen wants him to know; then the book ends presumably with Sonea telling him of the black magic being practised by Akkarin.

== Writing the book ==
On her webpage, Canavan describes that the main inspiration for the first chapter came from watching a documentary of the 1992 Olympic Games in Barcelona:

I was watching late night news and saw a report on how the city authorities had sent trucks around the city, into which all the homeless were loaded and then taken them to other cities. That night I dreamed that I was one among hundreds of people being driven out of a city... by magicians. We started throwing stones and instead I threw magic. I woke up and wrote down the dream, sure that in the morning I'd read it and laugh (most dreams make for bad stories). But I didn't. Later it fit with a world I'd created where magic was latent and required expert tuition, so the teaching of it became a priviledge [sic] only available to the rich.

— Trudi Canavan, author's website

== Awards and nominations ==
- Aurealis Award Nomination: Shortlist for Best Fantasy Novel of 2002
