= Singing the Dogstar Blues =

1998 novel by Alison Goodman

- Singing the Dogstar Blues first edition cover.
- Author: Alison Goodman
- Cover artist: Grant Gittus
- Language: English
- Genre: Young adult, science fiction
- Publisher: HarperCollins
- Publication date: 28 August 1998
- Publication place: Australia
- Media type: Print (hardback & paperback)
- Pages: 199 (first edition)
- ISBN: 0-7322-5967-3

Singing the Dogstar Blues is a 1998 young adult science fiction novel by Alison Goodman. It follows the story of Joss who is a student of time travel and has been given the task of being the study partner of the alien student Mavkel.

== Background ==
Singing the Dogstar Blues was first published in Australia on 28 August 1998 by HarperCollins in trade paperback format. In 1999 it was released as an audiobook by Louis Braille Books and has been released in the United States and United Kingdom in 2003 and 2004 respectively. Singing the Dogstar Blues was released in Germany under the title of Galaxy Blues in 2003 and in the Netherlands as Blues voor Sirius in 2008. Singing the Dogstar Blues won the 1999 Aurealis Award for best young-adult novel and was a short-list nominee for Aurealis Award for best science fiction novel of the same year.

== Synopsis ==
Joss gets partnered with an alien, Mavkel, who has somehow survived the usually fatal loss of his linked partner Kelmav. She gradually realises that she is expected to link with him, as she is the most open of all the students. They travel back in time to find out why and discover it was because the time-travelling Mavkel accidentally contaminated her as a pre-implantation embryo.
