= Maria Lewis =

Australian author, screenwriter and commentator

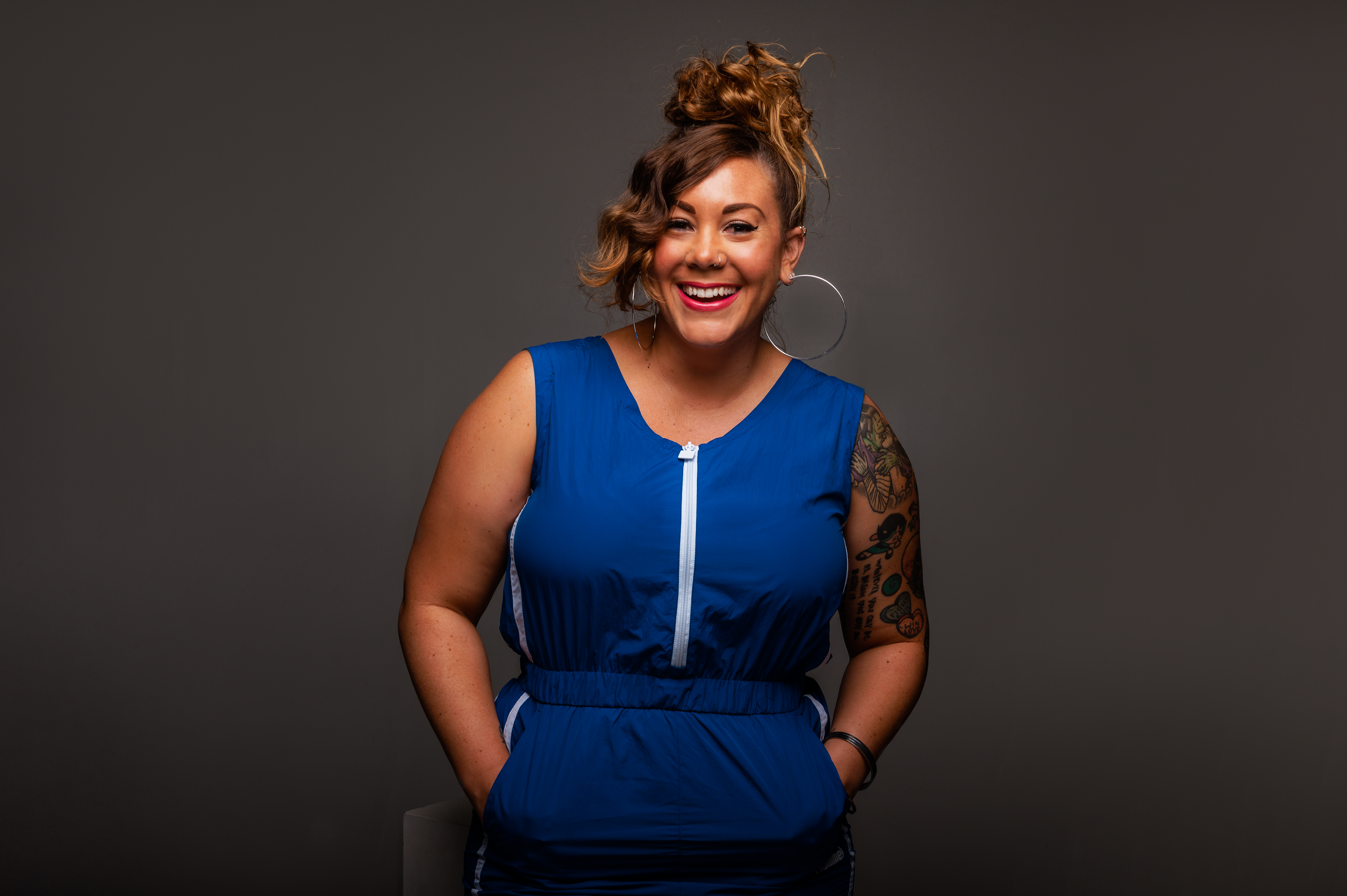
- Born: New Zealand
- Occupations: Author, screenwriter, journalist
- Website: marialewis.com.au

Maria Lewis is an author, screenwriter and pop culture commentator from Australia.

== Early life and education ==
Lewis was born in New Zealand on the South Island before moving to the Gold Coast, Queensland. She started her journalism career as a teenager at the Gold Coast Bulletin, covering crime and general news. Her work on pop culture has appeared in publications such as Empire, Penthouse, Junkee, New York Post, The Guardian, i09, The Daily and Sunday Telegraph, BuzzFeed, and others.

== Career ==
Lewis was known for her role as a panelist, presenter, writer and producer on SBS Viceland's nightly news program The Feed and is an ambassador for the Australian Stroke Foundation after surviving a Transient ischemic attack (TIA) when she was twenty-two. She was the writer, researcher, host and producer of audio documentaries Josie and the Podcats – which looked at the 2001 cult film Josie and the Pussycats – and The Phantom Never Dies, about the world’s first superhero, The Phantom. Lewis won the 2022 Audio - Non-Fiction AWGIE Award for episode two of the series - The Phantom Never Dies: ‘Fantomen’ - and silver at the Australian Podcast Awards for Best Arts & Culture program, along with a nomination for Presenter Of The Year at the Radio Today Podcast Awards. In 2023, The Phantom Never Dies was awarded the Convenors' Award for Excellence (Aurealis Award) for "highlighting diverse fans and fandoms".

She primarily works as a screenwriter for film and television, including projects for AMC, Netflix, SBS, Ubisoft, ABC, Stan, DC Comics, and has curated seasons at the Australian Centre for the Moving Image on Creature from the Black Lagoon, Aussie neo-noir (titled Yeah Noir), Australian rom-coms (Yeah The Girls) and cult classics like Birds Of Prey, Candyman and Mad Max: Fury Road (ACMI Watches). Her Aurealis Award and Ditmar Award-nominated short story The House That Hungers was adapted into a short film starring Kimie Tsuakoshi in the lead role, with Lewis serving as writer, director, and producer. It premiered at Supanova in 2023.

== Writing ==
Lewis is the author of several award-winning books and short stories. Her debut novel Who's Afraid? was published globally in 2015 and kickstarted the eight-book Supernatural Sisters series which "examined the feminine grotesque and the idea of female monsters". Each novel of the series featured a different type of classic mythological monster as its main character, with characters and timelines overlapping before the finale, Her Fierce Creatures, which was published in 2022. The series was nominated for several awards, including an Aurealis Award in 2018 for Best Horror Novel for Who's Afraid Too?, and the Aurealis Award for Best Fantasy Novel for The Wailing Woman and The Rose Daughter in 2020 and 2022, respectively. Her fourth book, The Witch Who Courted Death, won the Aurealis Award for Best Fantasy Novel in 2019.

Lewis' first crime-fiction novel, The Graveyard Shift - was acquired by Angry Robot and announced on Halloween 2022, with The Bookseller calling it "slasher-crime for the millennial generation". She told the publication: "The Graveyard Shift is the realisation of a lifelong dream of mine: to write a slasher". She was named as the author of Mockingbird: Strike Out, a new novel from Marvel featuring S.H.I.E.L.D. Agent and super-spy Bobbi Morse. The novel sees her team up with S.T.R.I.K.E.'s Lance Hunter following her divorce from Clint Barton aka Hawkeye. She is the author of the Assassin's Creed novel Mirage – Daughter of No One, which serves as a tie-in to the video game Assassin's Creed Mirage (2023) and explores the backstory of one of the game's major characters, Roshan.

== Bibliography ==
=== Novels ===
- Mockingbird: Strike Out (Lewis: 6 June 2023: Aconyte)
- The Graveyard Shift (Lewis: 10 October 2023, Angry Robot)
- Assassin's Creed Mirage – Daughter of No One (Lewis: 7 November 2023: Aconyte)

Supernatural Sisters

- Who's Afraid? - Supernatural Sisters #1 (Lewis: 12 December 2015: Hachette Australia) (Lewis: 14 July 2016: Piatkus UK)
- Who's Afraid Too? - Supernatural Sisters #2 (Lewis: 21 Jan 2017: Hachette Australia) (Lewis: 14 July 2017: Piatkus UK)
- It Came From The Deep - Supernatural Sisters #3 (Lewis: 21 October 2017: IngramSpark)
- The Witch Who Courted Death - Supernatural Sisters #4 (Lewis: 31 October 2018: Hachette Australia) (Lewis: 9 March 2019: Piatkus UK)
- The Wailing Woman - Supernatural Sisters #5 (Lewis: 1 November 2019: Hachette Australia) (Lewis: 9 March 2020: Piatkus UK)
- Who's Still Afraid? - Supernatural Sisters #6 (Lewis: 21 October 2020: IngramSpark)
- The Rose Daughter - Supernatural Sisters #7 (Lewis: 6 April 2021: Hachette Australia) (Lewis: 21 October 2021: Piatkus UK)
- Her Fierce Creatures - Supernatural Sisters #8 (Lewis: 13 March 2022: Hachette Australia) (Lewis: 4 October 2022: Piatkus UK)

=== Short stories ===
- Hot Stuff: Surfing Love (Caruso, Lewis, Sinclair. Woods: 1 Jan 2016: HarperCollins Publishers Australia)
- Doing It: A Sex Positive Anthology (Pickering, Ford, Lewis et al: 29 August 2016: University Of Queensland Press)
- And Then... The Great Big Book Of Awesome Adventure Tales: Volume 2 (Goodman, Lewis, Nette et al.: 7 August 2017: Clan Destine Press)
- Tales From Kayfabia: The Unfortunate Origins of Jimmy Havoc Audio Short Story (Lewis: 2 November 2018: Conco and the Fudge)
- The Otherworld Sister - Supernatural Sisters #4.5 (Lewis: 21 September 2020: IngramSpark)
- The House That Hungers (Lewis: 13 November 2021: Aurealis #146)
- Damnation Games (Baxter, Lee, Anderton, Lewis et al: 1 November 2022: Clan Destine Press)
