= Karen Miller =

Australian writer

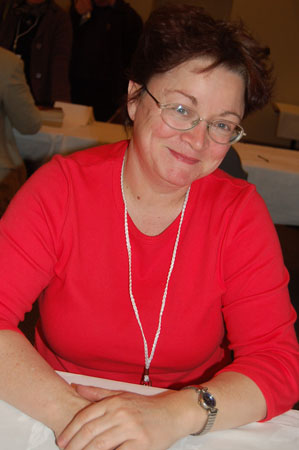
- Miller in 2007
- Born: Karen Miller; Vancouver, British Columbia, Canada
- Occupation: Novelist
- Writing career
- Pen name: K. E. Mills
- Period: 2005—present
- Genre: Fantasy
- Website: https://www.karenmiller.net

Karen Miller is an Australian writer. She is best known for The Innocent Mage, the first book in her duology Kingmaker, Kingbreaker.

== Biography ==
Miller was born in Vancouver, British Columbia, Canada and moved to Australia at the age of two. After graduating from the University of Technology, Sydney she moved to England for three years before moving back to Australia. Along with being a novelist she has written and directed plays for her local theatre group.

In 2005, Miller's first novel was released entitled The Innocent Mage. This was the first novel in the Kingmaker, Kingbreaker series and was followed shortly after by Innocence Lost. The Innocent Mage was widely acclaimed on its release in Australia and was a finalist in the 2005 Aurealis Awards fantasy division. Since then, she has written several other novels, including two for Fandemonium's Stargate SG-1 series. In 2007, she was shortlisted for the James Tiptree, Jr. Award for her novels Empress of Mijak and The Riven Kingdom.

Miller also writes under the pseudonym K. E. Mills, releasing the first novel in the Rogue Agent series, The Accidental Sorcerer, under this pen name.

== Bibliography ==
=== Kingmaker, Kingbreaker Universe ===
- Kingmaker, Kingbreaker (title of omnibus edition)
  - The Innocent Mage (2005)
  - Innocence Lost (The Awakened Mage in US/Canada/UK) (2005)
- Fisherman's Children
  - The Prodigal Mage (2009)
  - The Reluctant Mage (2010)
- Prequel
  - A Blight of Mages (2012)

=== Godspeaker ===
- Empress of Mijak (Empress in US/Canada/UK) (2007)
- The Riven Kingdom (2007)
- Hammer of God (2008)

=== Rogue Agent ===
- The Accidental Sorcerer (2008) writing as K. E. Mills. ISBN 978-0-7322-8763-4
- Witches Incorporated (2009) writing as K. E. Mills. ISBN 978-0-316-03544-6
- Wizard Squared (June 2010) writing as K. E. Mills. ISBN 978-1-84149-729-7
- Wizard Undercover (May 2012) writing as K. E. Mills. ISBN 978-1-84149-994-9

=== The Tarnished Crown ===
- The Falcon Throne (2014)

=== Star Wars ===
- The Clone Wars: Wild Space (2008)
- Clone Wars Gambit: Stealth (2010)
- Clone Wars Gambit: Siege (2010)
- "Roll of the Dice" (2012), in Star Wars Insider

=== Stargate SG-1 ===
- Alliances (2006)
- Medical Considerations (2006) in the Stargate Magazine
- Do No Harm (2008)

== Awards and nominations ==
=== Aurealis Awards ===
Fantasy division

- Finalist: The Innocent Mage (2005)
- Honoured: Empress of Mijak (2007)
- Finalist: The Riven Kingdom (2008)
- Finalist: Witches Incorporated (2009)

=== James Tiptree, Jr. Award ===
- Honoured: Empress of Mijak (2007)
- Honoured: The Riven Kingdom (2007)
