= Alison Goodman =

Australian writer

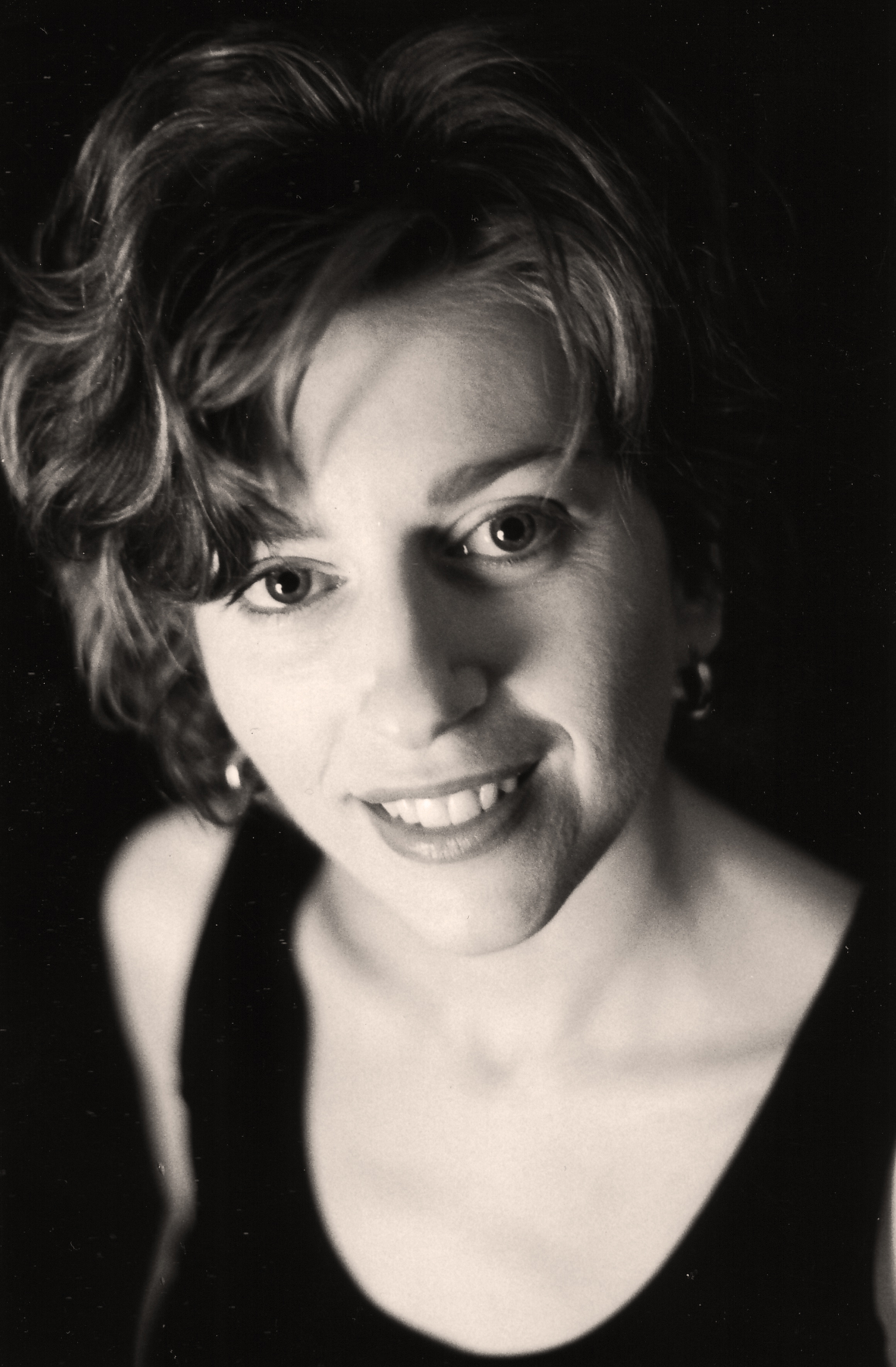
- Alison Goodman
- Born: 18 August 1966 (age 60); Melbourne, Victoria, Australia
- Occupation: Novelist
- Writing career
- Notable works: Singing the Dogstar Blues, Killing the Rabbit, Eona duology
- Website: www.alisongoodman.com.au

Alison Goodman (born 18 August 1966) is an Australian writer of books for young adults.

== Life and career ==
Goodman's debut novel Singing the Dogstar Blues (published in Australia 1998, subsequently released in several foreign editions) won an Aurealis Award for Best Young Adult Novel. In July 2007, her adult crime thriller Killing the Rabbit was published in the United States and was shortlisted for the Davitt Award.

The first book in her crossover fantasy duology The Two Pearls of Wisdom was published in Australia and the U.K in mid-2008. It was also released in the United States in late December 2008 under the title Eon: Dragoneye Reborn. It has subsequently been translated into 12 languages, and won the 2009 Aurealis Award for Best Fantasy Novel, is a 2008 James Tiptree, Jr. Award Honor Book and a Children's Book Council of Australia Notable Book.

Goodman has also written short stories for several anthologies. She has a master's degree in creative writing from RMIT University, and has taught in creative writing at the University of Ballarat.

== Bibliography ==
=== Novels ===
- Singing the Dogstar Blues (1998)
- Killing the Rabbit (2007)
- The Two Pearls of Wisdom (2008) (a.k.a. Eon: Dragoneye Reborn and Eon: Rise of the Dragoneye)
- Eona (2011) (a.k.a. Eona: The Last Dragoneye, a.k.a. The Necklace of the Gods)
- A New Kind of Death (2012) (rev. ed. of Killing the Rabbit)
- The Dark Days Club: A Lady Helen Novel (2016) (a.k.a. Lady Helen and the Dark Days Club)
- The Dark Days Pact: A Lady Helen Novel (2017)
- The Dark Days Deceit: A Lady Helen Novel (2018)
- The Benevolent Society of Ill-Mannered Ladies (2023)
- The Ladies Road Guide to Utter Ruin (2025) (a.k.a. Ill-Mannered Ladies #2)

=== Short fiction ===
- "One Last Zoom at the Buzz Bar" (1994) in The Patternmaker: Nine Science Fiction Stories (ed. Lucy Sussex)
- "Dead Spyders" (1997) in Eidolon, Issue 24, Autumn 1997 (ed. Jonathan Strahan, Jeremy G. Byrne, Richard Scriven)
- "The Real Thing" (2006) in Firebirds Rising: An Original Anthology of Science Fiction and Fantasy (ed. Sharyn November)

== Awards ==
- 2024 winner, Readers' choice Davitt Award for The Benevolent Society of Ill-Mannered Ladies
- 2010 listed on the 2010 International Readers Association Young Adult Choices List. for "Eon: Dragoneye Reborn"
- 2010 listed on the 2010 Amelia Bloomer Project for "Eon: Dragoneye Reborn"
- 2010 listed as an American Library Association Best Young Adult Book for 2010 "Eon: Dragoneye Reborn"
- 2009 Shortlisted for the 2009 Victorian Premier's Literary Award, The Prize for Young Adult Fiction, The Two Pearls of Wisdom (a.k.a. Eon: Dragoneye Reborn).
- 2009 Notable Book, Children's Book Council of Australia, The Two Pearls of Wisdom
- 2008 won Best Fantasy Novel (and was shortlisted for the Best Young Adult Novel) in the Aurealis Awards, The Two Pearls of Wisdom (a.k.a. Eon: Dragoneye Reborn)
- 2008 James Tiptree, Jr. Award Honor Book, The Two Pearls of Wisdom (a.k.a. Eon: Dragoneye Reborn)
- 2008 Shortlisted, New South Wales Premier's Literary Awards, Ethel Turner Prize, The Two Pearls of Wisdom
- 2004 listed, Best Books for Young Adults, American Library Association, Singing the Dogstar Blues
- 1999 D. J. O'Hearn memorial fellow, University of Melbourne
- 1999 shortlist, Cross Pen Prize for Young Adult Fiction, Victorian Premier's Literary Awards, Singing the Dogstar Blues
- 1999 shortlisted for Talking Book of the Year Award, young people's category, Royal Blind Society, Singing the Dogstar Blues
- 1999 Notable Book, Book of the Year Awards, Children's Book Council of Australia, Singing the Dogstar Blues
- 1998 Finalist of Aurealis Awards, Best Science Fiction Novel, Singing the Dogstar Blues
- 1998 Winner of Aurealis Awards, Best Young Adult Novel, Singing the Dogstar Blues
