= Geoffrey McSkimming =

Australian children's novelist and poet

- Born: 1 January 1962 (age 64); Sydney, New South Wales, Australia
- Occupations: Children's novelist; Poet
- Spouse: Sue-Anne Webster
- Writing career
- Genres: Children's literature; Mystery fiction; Poetry
- Notable works: Cairo Jim chronicles; Phyllis Wong mysteries; Jocelyn Osgood jaunts

Geoffrey McSkimming (born 1 January 1962) is an Australian children's novelist and poet. He is the author of the 20 volume Cairo Jim chronicles and Jocelyn Osgood jaunts and the Phyllis Wong series of mystery novels. He has also published three volumes of poetry.

McSkimming was born in Sydney, Australia. To write his Cairo Jim stories, he travelled to Egypt, Peru, Tanzania (including Zanzibar), Greece, Mexico, Turkey, Italy and Singapore and other locations.

Geoffrey McSkimming has published more than seventy short stories in magazines and has contributed verse to various poetry anthologies. He narrated the Cairo Jim chronicles as audio books for Bolinda Publishing. The audio version of his book of verse, Ogre in a Toga and Other Perverse Verses, was shortlisted in the Audie Awards (US) in 2008. He wrote five character tours which were performed in the galleries at the Art Gallery of NSW in Sydney, Australia, from 2000 through 2013. In June 2006 Geoffrey McSkimming undertook an author tour of the UK for Walker Books, who released ten titles in the Cairo Jim series in the UK. In 2009 he wrote and presented The Mysteries of the Mitchell Tour a commissioned curated tour celebrating 100 years of the Mitchell Library in Sydney. These tours ran for a number of years.

Geoffrey McSkimming's 27th novel, Phyllis Wong and the Lure of the Lighthouse, was published in 2026 by 9 Diamonds Press. His 32nd book, The Fernhurst Mysteries, was also published in 2026.

All titles in the Cairo Jim chronicles are now e-published by 9 Diamonds Press, as well as new print editions. A completely new Cairo Jim novel, Cairo Jim and the Portal of Peristophanes -- The Return of Cairo Jim, was published in October 2021.

Geoffrey McSkimming is an avid collector and reader of first editions of Victorian and Edwardian detective and mystery fiction, with a particular interest in the works of Fergus Hume and Richard Marsh.

Geoffrey McSkimming is represented by Curtis Brown Literary Agency, London.

== Books ==
- The Fernhurst Mysteries (2026)
- Phyllis Wong and the Lure of the Lighthouse (2026)
- Ogre in a Toga and More Perverse Verse (2023)
- Cairo Jim and the Portal of Peristophanes – The Return of Cairo Jim (2021)
- Phyllis Wong and the Crumpled Stranger (2020)
- Phyllis Wong and the Vanishing Emeralds (2018)
- Phyllis Wong and the Girl who Danced with Lightning (2017)
- The Startling Tale of Hamlet, Prince of Denmark (2016)
- Phyllis Wong and the Pockets of the Shadows (2016)
- Phyllis Wong and the Waking of the Wizard (2015; ebook and revised edition 2018)
- Phyllis Wong and the Return of the Conjuror (2014; ebook and revised edition 2018)
- Phyllis Wong and the Secrets of Mr. Okyto (2012; ebook and revised edition 2018)
- Ogre in a Toga and Other Perverse Verses (2008)
- Cairo Jim and the Astragals of Angkor (2007; ebook and revised edition 2017)
- Cairo Jim at the Crossroads of Orpheus (2006; ebook and revised edition 2017)
- Cairo Jim and the Sumptuous Stash of Silenus (2005; ebook and revised edition 2017)
- Cairo Jim and Jocelyn Osgood in Bedlam from Bollywood (2004; ebook and revised edition 2017)
- Cairo Jim and the Rorting of Rameses' Regalia (2003; ebook and revised edition 2017)
- Cairo Jim and the Chaos from Crete (2002; ebook and revised edition 2017)
- Cairo Jim and the Tyrannical Bauble of Tiberius (2001; ebook and revised edition 2017)
- Cairo Jim and the Lagoon of Tidal Magnificence (2000; ebook and revised edition 2016)
- Cairo Jim Amidst the Petticoats of Artemis (2000; ebook and revised edition 2016)
- Cairo Jim and the Secret Sepulchre of the Sphinx (1999; ebook and revised edition 2016)
- Jocelyn Osgood: Ascent into Asgard (1998; ebook and revised edition 2024)
- Cairo Jim and the Quest for the Quetzal Queen (1997; ebook and revised edition 2016)
- Cairo Jim's Bumper Book of Flabbergasting Fragments (1996)
- Cairo Jim and the Alabastron of Forgotten Gods (1996; ebook and revised edition 2016)
- Jocelyn Osgood: Xylophones above Zarundi (1995; ebook and revised edition 2024)
- Cairo Jim and the Sunken Sarcophagus of Sekheret (1994; e-book and revised edition 2016)
- Jocelyn Osgood: After the Puce Empress (1993; ebook and revised edition 2024)
- Cairo Jim on the Trail to ChaCha Muchos (1992; ebook and revised edition 2016)
- Cairo Jim & Doris in Search of Martenarten (1991; ebook and revised edition 2016)

His Cairo Jim and Jocelyn Osgood books have been published in many different languages in Australia, United Kingdom, Japan, Korea, Portugal, Germany, Italy, Poland, Russia, Hungary, and New Zealand.

== Inspiration ==
"When Geoffrey McSkimming was a boy he found an old motion-picture projector and a tin containing a dusty home movie in his grandmother's attic. He screened the film and was transfixed by the flickering image of a man in a jaunty pith helmet, baggy Sahara shorts and special desert sun-spectacles. The man had an imposing macaw and a clever looking camel, and Geoffrey McSkimming was mesmerised by their activities in black-and-white Egypt, Peru, Greece, Mexico, Sumatra, Turkey, Italy and other exotic locations.

Years later he discovered the identities of the trio, and has spent much of his time since then retracing their footsteps, interviewing surviving members of the Old Relics Society, and gradually reconstructing the lost true tales of Cairo Jim, which have become the enormously successful Cairo Jim chronicles."
