= Moonfall =

Moonfall may refer to:

== Fiction ==
- Moonfall (film), a 2022 film by Roland Emmerich
- Moonfall (novel), a 1998 novel by Jack McDevitt
- Moon Fall series, a 2022 novel series by James Rollins
- Operation Moonfall, a video game fan extension to The Legend of Zelda: Majora's Mask 3D
- Moonfall, a 1991 computer game released for the Commodore 64, Amiga and Atari ST; see List of space flight simulation games

== Music ==
- Moonfall, a 2005 album by Sasha Lazard
- "Moonfall", a song from the musical The Mystery of Edwin Drood (musical)
- "Moonfall", a 2006 song off the album All I Ask of You (album)by Marina Prior
