= Age of the Five =

Trilogy by Trudi Canavan

Priestess of the White
- Priestess of the White cover
- Author: Trudi Canavan
- Language: English
- Series: Age of the Five
- Genre: Fantasy
- Publication date: November 2005 (Australia); 2 February 2006 (UK)
- Publication place: Australia
- Media type: Print
- ISBN: 1-84149-386-4 (UK hardback); ISBN 1-84149-515-8 (UK Paperback)
- Followed by: Last of the Wilds

Last of the Wilds
- Last of the Wilds cover
- Author: Trudi Canavan
- Language: English
- Series: Age of the Five
- Genre: Fantasy
- Publication date: April 2006 (Australia); 1 August 2006 (UK hardback); 18 January 2007 (UK paperback)
- Publication place: Australia
- Media type: Print
- ISBN: 0-06-081591-4; ISBN 1-84149-387-2 (UK hardback); ISBN 1-84149-516-6 (UK paperback)
- Preceded by: Priestess of the White
- Followed by: Voice of the Gods

Voice of the Gods
- Voice of the Gods cover
- Author: Trudi Canavan
- Language: English
- Series: Age of the Five
- Genre: Fantasy
- Publication date: November 2006 (Australia); 1 July 2007 (UK)
- Publication place: Australia
- Media type: Print
- ISBN: 0-7322-7871-6; ISBN 1-84149-388-0 (UK hardback)
- Preceded by: Last of the Wilds

Age of the Five is a trilogy of fantasy novels by Australian author Trudi Canavan; it consists of the novels: Priestess of the White, Last of the Wilds and Voice of the Gods. The fictional series recounts the story of Auraya, a young priestess who, after rising to the highest rank in her world's religious hierarchy, subsequently discovers that the gods she worships are significantly different entities from those in whom she was originally taught to believe.

== Plot synopsis ==
Age of the Five is set in a universe overseen by a pantheon of five gods (the Circle) who are the only apparent survivors of the War of the Gods. Before this war, it is understood that hundreds of gods existed on Earth. The Five control the destiny of the northern half of the world through a priesthood known as the White (the Circle's five representatives in the human world, Ithania). In southern Ithania live opponents of the White, who claim to worship five different gods (known as the Five). Both factions vie for control over their opponents, and eventually engage in war.

Auraya (protagonist) is chosen to be a White. Beginning with diplomatic missions, she later moves on to fighting in a major battle between the north and the south. She discovers she has innate powers far exceeding those of her peers; it later turns out that she is a potential new Wild (a group of immortal sorcerers who have been persecuted by the will of the gods). Later in the series the Wilds are discovered to be at the final stage before godhood, and they discover a way to kill the existing pantheon of gods. Throughout the series Auraya's attitude towards her gods changes from obedience to distrust to hatred, as she realizes their moral defects.

In the end, the pantheon are trapped by the Wilds, whereupon one of the Gods commits suicide killing all the other gods too. The epilogue reveals that humanity spends the next fifty years warring in the power vacuum left by the gods until a new religion (with a single, all-powerful god, the Maker) is adopted by the Sennon emperor to keep the peace.

== The Five/Circle ==
After the War of the Gods (in which many deities were killed), only six gods were left alive. Following the suicide of the sixth (Sorli) the remainder established themselves as gods of Ithania, creating two rival traditions to worship them: the Pentadrians and the Circlians. Assuming different names and images for each religion, the Five spent their time playing games with humanity, pitting the religions against each other and convincing each faith that the other was heretical. The Five were known as the Circle in the Circlian religion, and as the Five to the Pentadrians; they were represented by the White in the Circlians, and the Voices of the Gods to the Pentadrians.

The Five were killed when six Wilds surrounded them, creating a void. When the Wilds drew the magic away, one area of magic was left in the center of the newly created void. Although the gods could have survived until the magic flowed back (freeing them), Chaia (trying to protect the humans from the other gods' influence) drew all the magic into himself, killing himself and the other four gods.

To the Circlians, the Five were:

- Chaia: God of Kings
- Huan: Goddess of Fertility
- Lore: God of War
- Yranna: Goddess of Women
- Saru: God of Wealth

To the Pentadrians, the Five were:

- Sheyr: God of Prosperity
- Hrun: Goddess of Love
- Alor: God of Warriors
- Ranah: Goddess of Moon and Fire
- Sraal: God of Gambling

=== Chaia/Sheyr ===
Known as Chaia (God of Kings) to the Circlians and Sheyr (God of Prosperity) to the Pentadrians, Chaia was a legendary seducer (on a par with Mirar) who was hated by the immortals and Dreamweavers for his sexual habits. Using magic to please his lovers in a way no physical sensation could match, he left young women mad (and shells of their former selves) when he grew bored and cast them aside. As Auraya's lover Chaia protected her and interceded on her behalf, showing her the treachery of Huan and saving her from being raped and killed by Nekaun. There is evidence he was sincerely attached to Auraya.

=== Huan/Hrun ===
Known as Huan (Goddess of Fertility) to the Circlians and Hrun (Goddess of Love) to the Pentadrians, Huan was notorious for her capriciousness and cruelty. Deforming and torturing thousands of humans to create mutants such as the Siyee and Elai, Huan was hated by Dreamweavers and immortals alike. She was initially a supporter of Auraya, but after the White's refusal to kill Mirar (or let the goddess possess her), Huan attempted to kill and maim her. Chaia blamed her for pushing Auraya too far. She was a proud, arrogant, scheming goddess, demanding unquestioning obedience from her followers.

Decisions were mostly made by Chaia and Huan, the other Gods were mainly persuaded to follow their point of view. They were not as united as they wanted their followers to believe.

== Reception ==
Critical reception from the fantasy press was positive. Jennifer Fallon said, "A wonderfully and meticulously detailed world, and an edge-of-the-seat plot, this book is a must for lovers of good fantasy". Emerald City called Canavan "a natural storyteller". "Containing everything you want from a fantasy tale", reported Death Ray. SFRevu called it "High calibre fantasy from one of Australia's best".
