= 2009 in Australian literature =

This article presents a list of the historical events and publications of Australian literature during 2009.

== Events ==
- HarperCollins takes over ABC Books – the publishing arm of the Australian Broadcasting Corporation.
- Caro Llewellyn, resigns as director of the new Centre for Books, Writing and Ideas (now called the Wheeler Centre) in Melbourne before taking up the role. Chrissy Sharp, the Australian general manager of Sadler's Wells Theatre in London, is appointed to take her place.
- The Australia-Asia Literary Award, based in Western Australia, is suspended.

== Major publications ==
=== Literary fiction ===
- Steven Amsterdam – Things We Didn't See Coming
- Peter Carey – Parrot and Olivier in America
- Steven Carroll – The Lost Life
- Brian Castro – The Bath Fugues
- Nick Cave – The Death of Bunny Munro
- Tracy Crisp – Black Dust Dancing
- Deborah Forster – The Book of Emmett
- Andrea Goldsmith – Reunion
- Marion Halligan – Valley of Grace
- Sonya Hartnett – Butterfly
- Eva Hornung – Dog Boy
- Katherine Johnson – Pescador's Wake
- Tom Keneally – The People's Train
- Kate Legge – The Marriage Club
- David Malouf – Ransom
- Alex Miller – Lovesong
- Jennifer Mills – The Diamond Anchor
- Liane Moriarty – What Alice Forgot
- Kristina Olsson – The China Garden
- Sonia Orchard – The Virtuoso
- Susan Varga – Headlong

=== Children's and Young Adult fiction ===
- Allan Baille – Krakatoa Lighthouse
- Alyssa Brugman – Girl Next Door
- Judith Clarke – The Winds of Heaven
- Mem Fox
  - Hello, Baby!
  - The Goblin and the Empty Chair
- Odo Hirsch – Darius Bell and the Glitter Pool
- Paul Jennings – The Nest
- Justine Larbalestier – How to Ditch Your Fairy
- Sophie Masson – The Madman of Venice
- David Metzenthen – Jarvis 24
- Tohby Riddle – The Lucky Ones
- Lili Wilkinson – Pink
- Sean Williams – The Scarecrow

=== Crime and Mystery ===
- Robert G. Barrett – High Noon in Nimbin
- Sydney Bauer – Move to Strike
- Marshall Browne – The Iron Heart
- Peter Corris – Deep Water
- Marianne Delacourt – Sharp Shooter
- Garry Disher – Blood Moon
- Kathryn Fox – Blood Born
- Leah Giarratano – Black Ice
- Kerry Greenwood – Forbidden Fruit
- Bronwyn Parry – Dark Country

=== Romance ===
- Michelle Douglas – The Aristocrat and The Single Mom
- Nicola Marsh – Two Weeks in the Magnate's Bed
- Katherine Scholes – The Hunter's Wife
- Maxine Sullivan – Valente's Baby

=== Science Fiction and Fantasy ===
- Trudi Canavan – The Magician's Apprentice
- Greg Egan
  - Crystal Nights and Other Stories
  - Oceanic
- Kim Falconer – The Spell of Rosette
- Pamela Freeman – Full Circle
- Christopher Green – "Father's Kill"
- Traci Harding – Being of the Field
- Deborah Kalin – Shadow Queen
- Glenda Larke – The Last Stormlord
- Juliet Marillier – Heart's Blood
- Ian McHugh – "Once a Month, On a Sunday"
- K. J. Taylor – The Dark Griffin
- Sean Williams – The Grand Conjunction

=== Drama ===
- Angela Betzien – The Dark Room
- Matt Cameron & Tim Finn – Poor Boy
- Joanna Murray-Smith – Rockabye
- Richard Tulloch – The Book of Everything
- David Williamson – Let the Sunshine

=== Poetry ===
- Emily Ballou – The Darwin Poems
- Judith Beveridge – Storm and Honey
- Emma Jones – The Striped World
- Jennifer Maiden – Pirate Rain
- Geoff Page – 60 Classic Australian Poems
- Dorothy Porter – The Bee Hut
- Peter Porter – Better Than God

=== Biographies ===
- Roger Averill – Boy He Cry: An Island Odyssey
- Stephen Cummings – Will It Be Funny Tomorrow, Billy?: Misadventures in Music
- Jacqueline Kent – The Making of Julia Gillard
- Harry M. Miller with Peter Holder – Harry M Miller: Confessions of a Not-So-Secret Agent
- Don Walker – Shots
- Jonathon Welch – Choir Man
- Shirley Walker – The Ghost at the Wedding
- George Whaley – Leo 'Rumpole' McKern: An Accidental Actor
- Kristin Williamson – David Williamson: Behind the Scenes

== Awards and honours ==
=== Lifetime achievement ===
| Award | Author |
|---|---|
| Christopher Brennan Award | Jennifer Strauss |
| Melbourne Prize for Literature | Gerald Murnane |
| Patrick White Award | Beverley Farmer |

=== Literary ===
| Award | Author | Title | Publisher |
|---|---|---|---|
| The Age Book of the Year | Steven Amsterdam | Things We Didn't See Coming | Sleepers Publishing |
| ALS Gold Medal | Christos Tsiolkas | The Slap | Allen & Unwin |
| Colin Roderick Award | Graham Freudenberg | Churchill and Australia | Pan Macmillan |
| Colin Roderick Award | James Boyce | Van Diemen's Land | Black Inc |
| Indie Book Awards Book of the Year | Craig Silvey | Jasper Jones | Allen & Unwin |
| Nita Kibble Literary Award | Jacqueline Kent | An Exacting Heart: The Story of Hephzibah Menuhin | Viking |

=== Fiction ===
==== International ====
| Award | Region | Category | Author | Title | Publisher |
|---|---|---|---|---|---|
| Commonwealth Writers' Prize | SE Asia and South Pacific | Best Novel | Christos Tsiolkas | The Slap | Allen & Unwin |
| Commonwealth Writers' Prize | Overall winner | Best Novel | Christos Tsiolkas | The Slap | Allen & Unwin |

==== National ====
| Award | Author | Title | Publisher |
|---|---|---|---|
| Adelaide Festival Awards for Literature | Not awarded | | |
| The Age Book of the Year Award | Steven Amsterdam | Things We Didn't See Coming | Sleepers Publishing |
| The Australian/Vogel Literary Award | Lisa Lang | Utopian Man | Allen & Unwin |
| The Australian/Vogel Literary Award | Kristel Thornell | Night Street | Allen & Unwin |
| Barbara Jefferis Award | Helen Garner | The Spare Room | Text Publishing |
| Indie Book Awards Book of the Year – Fiction | Craig Silvey | Jasper Jones | Allen & Unwin |
| Indie Book Awards Book of the Year – Debut Fiction | Sonia Orchard | The Virtuoso | Fourth Estate |
| Miles Franklin Award | Tim Winton | Breath | Random House |
| Prime Minister's Literary Award | Nam Le | The Boat | Hamish Hamilton |
| New South Wales Premier's Literary Awards | Joan London | The Good Parents | Hamish Hamilton |
| Queensland Premier's Literary Awards | Richard Flanagan | Wanting | Random House |
| Victorian Premier's Literary Award | Christos Tsiolkas | The Slap | Allen & Unwin |
| Western Australian Premier's Book Awards | Craig Silvey | Jasper Jones | Allen & Unwin |
| Western Australian Premier's Book Awards | J. M. Coetzee | Summertime | Harvill Secker |

=== Children and Young Adult ===
==== National ====
| Award | Category | Author | Title | Publisher |
|---|---|---|---|---|
| Children's Book of the Year Award | Older Readers | Shaun Tan | Tales from Outer Suburbia | Allen & Unwin |
| Children's Book of the Year Award | Younger Readers | Glenda Millard, illus. Stephen Michael King | Perry Angel's Suitcase | ABC Books |
| Children's Book of the Year Award | Picture Book | Kylie Dunstan | Collecting Colour | Lothian |
| Children's Book of the Year Award | Early Childhood | Bob Graham | How to Heal a Broken Wing | Walker Books |
| Davitt Award | Young Adult Novel | Catherine Jinks | Genius Squad | Allen & Unwin |
| Indie Book Awards Book of the Year | Children's & YA | Sally Murphy & Heather Potter (Illus) | Pearl Verses The World | Walker Books |
| New South Wales Premier's Literary Awards | Children's | Ursula Dubosarsky and Tohby Riddle | The Word Spy | Penguin |
| New South Wales Premier's Literary Awards | Young People's | Michelle Cooper | A Brief History of Montmaray | Random House Australia |
| Queensland Premier's Literary Awards | Children's | Gaye Chapman | Little Blue | Little Hare Books |
| Queensland Premier's Literary Awards | Young Adult | Glenda Millard | A Small Free Kiss in the Dark | Allen & Unwin |
| South Australian Premier's Awards | Children's | Not awarded | | |
| Victorian Premier's Literary Award | Young Adult Fiction | Sue Saliba | Something in the World Called Love | Penguin |
| Western Australian Premier's Book Awards | Children's | Bob Graham | How to Heal a Broken Wing | Walker Books |
| Western Australian Premier's Book Awards | Writing for Young Adults | Shaun Tan | Tales from Outer Suburbia | Allen & Unwin |

=== Crime and Mystery ===
==== National ====
| Award | Category | Author | Title | Publisher |
|---|---|---|---|---|
| Davitt Award | Novel | Malla Nunn | A Beautiful Place to Die | Pan Macmillan |
| Davitt Award | Young adult novel | Catherine Jinks | Genius Squad | Allen & Unwin |
| Davitt Award | True crime | Chloe Hooper | The Tall Man | Penguin |
| Davitt Award | Readers' choice | Katherine Howell | The Darkest Hour | Pan Macmillan |
| Ned Kelly Award | Novel | Peter Corris | Deep Water | Allen & Unwin |
| Ned Kelly Award | Novel | Kel Robertson | Smoke and Mirrors | Ginninderra Press |
| Ned Kelly Award | First novel | Nick Gadd | Ghostlines | Scribe |
| Ned Kelly Award | True crime | Chloe Hooper | The Tall Man | Penguin |
| Ned Kelly Award | Lifetime achievement | Shane Maloney | | |

=== Science Fiction and Fantasy ===
==== International ====
| Award | Category | Author | Title | Publisher |
|---|---|---|---|---|
| World Fantasy Award | Best Novel | Margo Lanagan | Tender Morsels | Knopf |

==== National ====
| Award | Category | Author | Title | Publisher |
|---|---|---|---|---|
| Aurealis Award | SF Novel | Andrew McGahan | Wonders of a Godless World | Allen & Unwin |
| Aurealis Award | SF Short Story | Peter M. Ball | "Clockwork, Patchwork and Ravens" | Apex Magazine |
| Aurealis Award | Fantasy Novel | Trudi Canavan | The Magician's Apprentice | Orbit Books |
| Aurealis Award | Fantasy Short Story | Christopher Green | "Father's Kill" | Beneath Ceaseless Skies |
| Aurealis Award | Fantasy Short Story | Ian McHugh | "Once a Month, On a Sunday" | Andromeda Spaceways Inflight Magazine |
| Aurealis Award | Horror Novel | Honey Brown | Red Queen | Penguin Books |
| Aurealis Award | Horror Short Story | Paul Haines | "Slice of Life – A Spot of Liver" | The Mayne Press |
| Aurealis Award | Horror Short Story | Paul Haines | "Wives" | Coeur de Lion Publishing (X6) |
| Ditmar Award | Novel | Margo Lanagan | Tender Morsels | Allen & Unwin |
| Ditmar Award | Novella/Novelette | Kirstyn McDermott | "Painlessness" | Greatest Uncommon Denominator |
| Ditmar Award | Short Story | Margo Lanagan | "The Goosle" | The Del Rey Book of Science Fiction and Fantasy |
| Ditmar Award | Collected Work | ed. Jack Dann | Dreaming Again | Voyager |
| Shadows Award | | Kaaron Warren | Slights | Angry Robot |

=== Poetry ===
| Award | Author | Title | Publisher |
|---|---|---|---|
| Adelaide Festival Awards for Literature | Not awarded | | |
| The Age Book of the Year | Peter Porter | Better Than God | Picador |
| Anne Elder Award | Emma Jones | The Striped World | Faber and Faber |
| Grace Leven Prize for Poetry | Not awarded | | |
| Mary Gilmore Prize | Not awarded | | |
| New South Wales Premier's Literary Awards | L. K. Holt | Man Wolf Man | John Leonard Press |
| Queensland Premier's Literary Awards | Emma Jones | The Striped World | Faber and Faber |
| Victorian Premier's Literary Award | Robert Adamson | The Golden Bird | Black Inc. |
| Western Australian Premier's Book Awards | Kate Middleton | Fire Season | Giramondo Publishing |

=== Drama ===
| Award | Author | Title | Publisher |
|---|---|---|---|
| Patrick White Playwrights' Award | Ian Wilding | Forever Seven | |

=== Non-Fiction ===
| Award | Category | Author | Title | Publisher |
|---|---|---|---|---|
| Adelaide Festival Awards for Literature | Non-Fiction | Not awarded | | |
| The Age Book of the Year | Non-fiction | Guy Rundle | Down to the Crossroads | Penguin Books |
| Indie Book Awards Book of the Year | Non-Fiction | Chloe Hooper | The Tall Man: Death and Life on Palm Island | Hamish Hamilton |
| Children's Book of the Year Award | Eve Pownall Award for Information Books | Lincoln Hall | Alive in the Death Zone | Random House |
| Davitt Award | True crime | Chloe Hooper | The Tall Man: Death and Life on Palm Island | Hamish Hamilton |
| National Biography Award | Biography | Ann Blainey | I Am Melba | Black Inc. |
| Prime Minister's Literary Awards | Non-fiction | Evelyn Juers | House of Exile: The Life and Times of Heinrich Mann and Nelly-Kroeger Mann | Giramondo Publishing |
| Prime Minister's Literary Awards | Non-fiction | Marilyn Lake and Henry Reynolds | Drawing the Global Colour Line | Melbourne University Press |
| New South Wales Premier's Literary Awards | Non-fiction | Chloe Hooper | The Tall Man: Death and Life on Palm Island | Hamish Hamilton |
| New South Wales Premier's History Awards | Australian History | Robin Gerster | Travels in Atomic Sunshine: Australia and the Occupation of Japan | Scribe |
| New South Wales Premier's History Awards | Community and Regional History | David Bollen | Up on the Hill: A History of St Patrick's College | UNSW Press |
| New South Wales Premier's History Awards | General History | Warwick Anderson | The Collectors of Lost Souls: Turning Kuru Scientists into Whitemen | Johns Hopkins University Press |
| New South Wales Premier's History Awards | Young People's | Anthony Hill | Captain Cook's Apprentice | Penguin Books |
| Queensland Premier's Literary Awards | Non-fiction | Chloe Hooper | The Tall Man: Death and Life on Palm Island | Hamish Hamilton |
| Queensland Premier's Literary Awards | History | Jill Roe | Stella Miles Franklin | Fourth Estate |
| Victorian Premier's Literary Award | Non-fiction | Chloe Hooper | The Tall Man: Death and Life on Palm Island | Hamish Hamilton |
| Western Australian Premier's Book Awards | Non-fiction | Iain McCalman | Darwin's Armada | W.W. Norton |
| Western Australian Premier's Book Awards | Western Australian history | Penelope Hetherington | Paupers, Poor Relief & Poor Houses | UWA Publishing |

== Deaths ==
- 14 January – Val Vallis, poet (born 1916)
- 3 June – Geoffrey C. Bingham, theological and short story writer (born 1919)
- 3 July – Frank Devine, journalist (born 1931)
- 6 September – Catherine Gaskin, author (born 1929 in Ireland)
- 8 September – Rica Erickson, botanical and historical writer (born 1908)
- 24 November – John West, poet (born 1951)

== See also ==
- 2009 in Australia
- 2009 in literature
- 2009 in poetry
- List of years in literature
- List of Australian literary awards
