= Aurealis Award for Best Young Adult Short Story =

Australian fiction award

Aurealis Award for young adult short story
- Awarded for: Excellence in young adult speculative fiction short stories
- Country: Australia
- Presented by: Chimaera Publications, Continuum Foundation
- First award: 1995
- Currently held by: Jo Hart
- Website: Official site

The Aurealis Awards are presented annually by the Australia-based Chimaera Publications and WASFF to published works in order to "recognise the achievements of Australian science fiction, fantasy, horror writers". To qualify, a work must have been first published by an Australian citizen or permanent resident between 1 January and 31 December of the corresponding year; the presentation ceremony is held the following year. It has grown from a small function of around 20 people to a two-day event attended by over 200 people.

Since their creation in 1995, awards have been given in various categories of speculative fiction. Categories currently include science fiction, fantasy, horror, speculative young adult fiction—with separate awards for novels and short fiction—collections, anthologies, illustrative works or graphic novels, children's books, and an award for excellence in speculative fiction. The awards have attracted the attention of publishers by setting down a benchmark in science fiction and fantasy. The continued sponsorship by publishers such as HarperCollins and Orbit has identified the award as an honour to be taken seriously.

The results are decided by a panel of judges from a list of submitted nominees; the long-list of nominees is reduced to a short list of finalists. Ties can occur if the panel decides both entries show equal merit, however they are encouraged to choose a single winner. The judges are selected from a public application process by the Award's management team.

This article lists all the short-list nominees and winners in the best young-adult short story category. Margo Lanagan has won the award three times and Isobelle Carmody has won it twice. Lanagan also holds the record for most nominations, with ten.

== Winners and nominees ==
In the following table, the years correspond to the year of the story's eligibility; the ceremonies are always held the following year. Each year links to the corresponding "year in literature" article. Entries with a blue background have won the award; those with a white background are the nominees on the short-list. If the short story was originally published in a book with other stories rather than by itself or in a magazine, the book title is included after the publisher's name.

* Winners and joint winners
* Nominees on the shortlist

| Year | Author(s) | Short story | Publisher or publication | Ref |
|---|---|---|---|---|
| 1995 | No award given | — | — | |
| 1996 | Isobelle Carmody* | "Green Monkey Dreams" | Viking Press (Green Monkey Dreams) | |
| 1996 | Dave Luckett | The Wizard and Me | Omnibus Books | |
| 1996 | James Moloney | The Pipe | Lothian Books | |
| 1996 | Gillian Rubinstein | "B'ku, B'ku" | Hyland House (Annie's Brother's Suit) | |
| 1996 | Keith Taylor | "At the Edge of the Sea" | Penguin Books (Dream Weavers) | |
| 1997 | Ruth Starke* | The Twist in the Tale | Lothian Books | |
| 1997 | Sheryl Gardner | The Peppercorn Tree | Lothian Books | |
| 1997 | Julie Ireland | "Hanging by a Thread" | HarperCollins (Hanging by a Thread and Other Stories) | |
| 1998 | No award given | — | — | |
| 1999 | No award given | — | — | |
| 2000 | Margo Lanagan* | "The Queen's Notice" | Allen & Unwin (White Time) | |
| 2000 | Brian Caswell | "Avalon" | Hodder Headline (Tales from the Wasteland) | |
| 2000 | Margo Lanagan | "The Boy Who Didn't Yearn" | Allen & Unwin (White Time) | |
| 2000 | Margo Lanagan | "Midsummer Mission" | Allen & Unwin (White Time) | |
| 2000 | Margo Lanagan | "White Time" | Allen & Unwin (White Time) | |
| 2001 | Isobelle Carmody* | Dreamwalker | Lothian Books | |
| 2001 | Garth Nix | "Lightning Bringer" | Simon & Schuster (Love & Sex: Ten Stories of Truth) | |
| 2002 | No award given | — | — | |
| 2003 | No award given | — | — | |
| 2004 | Margo Lanagan* | "Singing My Sister Down" | Allen & Unwin (Black Juice) | |
| 2004 | Chris Barnes | "The Glass Flower" | CSFG Publishing (Encounters) | |
| 2004 | Bill Congreve | "The Shooter at Heartrock Waterhole" | Viking Press (The Faery Reel: Tales from the Twilight Realm) | |
| 2004 | Margo Lanagan | "Rite of Spring" | Allen & Unwin (Black Juice) | |
| 2005 | Garth Nix* | "Nicholas Sayre and the Creature in the Case" | Allen & Unwin (Across the Wall: Tales of the Old Kingdom and Elsewhere) | |
| 2005 | Dirk Flinthart | "The Red Priest's Homecoming" | Andromeda Spaceways Inflight Magazine | |
| 2006 | Shaun Tan* | The Arrival | Lothian Books | |
| 2006 | Deborah Biancotti | "The Dying Light" | Eidolon Books (Eidolon I) | |
| 2006 | Simon Brown | "Leviathan" | Eidolon Books (Eidolon I) | |
| 2006 | Margo Lanagan | "Baby Jane" | Allen & Unwin (Red Spikes) | |
| 2006 | Margo Lanagan | "A Feather in the Breast of God" | Allen & Unwin (Red Spikes) | |
| 2006 | Margo Lanagan | "Forever Upward" | Allen & Unwin (Red Spikes) | |
| 2007 | Deborah Biancotti* | "A Scar for Leida" | Ticonderoga Publications (Fantastic Wonder Stories) | |
| 2007 | Shane Jiraiya Cummings | "Yamabushi Kaidan and the Smoke Dragon" | Ticonderoga Publications (Fantastic Wonder Stories) | |
| 2007 | Garth Nix | "Bad Luck, Trouble, Death and Vampire Sex" | Eclipse | |
| 2007 | Garth Nix | "Holly and Iron" | Allen & Unwin (Dark Alchemy) | |
| 2007 | Tracey Rolfe | "Cast Off" | Ticonderoga Publications (Fantastic Wonder Stories) | |
| 2008 | Trent Jamieson* | "Cracks" | Shiny | |
| 2008 | Deborah Biancotti | "The Tailor of Time" | Norilana Books (Clockwork Phoenix) | |
| 2008 | Dirk Flinthart | "This Is Not My Story" | Andromeda Spaceways Inflight Magazine | |
| 2008 | Kevin Maclean | "Eye of the Beholder" | DAW Books (Misspelled) | |
| 2009 | Cat Sparks* | "Seventeen" | CSFG Publishing (Masques) | |
| 2009 | Joanne Anderton | "Dragon Bones" | Andromeda Spaceways Inflight Magazine | |
| 2009 | Sue Isle | "Paper Dragons" | Shiny | |
| 2009 | Ian McHugh | "Once a Month, On a Sunday" | Andromeda Spaceways Inflight Magazine | |
| 2009 | Tansy Rayner Roberts | "Like Us" | Shiny | |
| 2010 | Margo Lanagan* | "A Thousand Flowers" | Allen & Unwin (Zombies Vs Unicorns) | |
| 2010 | Aidan Doyle | "Inksucker" | FableCroft Publishing (Worlds Next Door) | |
| 2010 | Dirk Flinthart | "One Story, No Refunds" | Shiny | |
| 2010 | Kaia Landelius & Tansy Rayner Roberts | "Nine Times" | FableCroft Publishing (Worlds Next Door) | |
| 2010 | Jen White | "An Ordinary Boy" | Tangled Bank Press (The Tangled Bank) | |
| 2011 | Sue Isle* | "Nation of the Night" | Twelfth Planet Press (Nightsiders) | |
| 2011 | Kathleen Jennings | "Finishing School" | Candlewick Press (Steampunk! An Anthology of Fantastically Rich and Strange Stories) | |
| 2011 | Cate Kennedy | "Seventy-Two Derwents" | Allen & Unwin (The Wicked Wood: Tales From the Tower Volume 2) | |
| 2011 | Martine Murray | "One Window" | Allen & Unwin (The Wilful Eye: Tales From the Tower Volume 1) | |
| 2011 | Tansy Rayner Roberts | "The Patrician" | Twelfth Planet Press (Love and Romanpunk) | |
| 2012 | Thoraiya Dyer* | "The Wisdom of the Ants" | Clarkesworld Magazine | |
| 2012 | Justin D'Ath | "Stilled Lifes x 11" | Ford Street Publishing (Trust Me Too) | |
| 2012 | Jack Heath | "Rats" | Ford Street Publishing (Trust Me Too) | |
| 2012 | Jack Nicholls | "The Statues of Melbourne" | Andromeda Spaceways Inflight Magazine 56 | |
| 2012 | Adrienne Tam | "The Worry Man" | BusyBird Publishing ([Untitled] 5) | |
| 2013 | Juliet Marillier* | "By Bone-light" | Ticonderoga Publications (Prickle Moon) | |
| 2013 | Joanne Anderton | "Mah Song" | FableCroft Publishing (The Bone Chime Song and Other Stories) | |
| 2013 | D. K. Mok | "Morning Star" | FableCroft Publishing (One Small Step, an anthology of discoveries) | |
| 2013 | Kim Wilkins | "The Year of Ancient Ghosts" | Ticonderoga Publications (The Year of Ancient Ghosts) | |
| 2014 | Dirk Flinthart* | "Vanilla" | Twelfth Planet Press (Kaleidoscope) | |
| 2014 | Goldie Alexander | "In Hades" | Celapene Press | |
| 2014 | Liz Argyll | "Falling Leaves" | Apex Magazine | |
| 2014 | D M Cornish | "The Fuller and the Bogle" | Omnibus Books (Tales from the Half-Continent) | |
| 2014 | Faith Mudge | "Signature" | Twelfth Planet Press (Kaleidoscope) | |
| 2015 | Deborah Kalin* | "The Miseducation of Mara Lys" | Twelfth Planet Press (Cherry Crow Children) | |
| 2015 | Kimberley Gaal | "In Sheep's Clothing" | Andromeda Spaceways Inflight Magazine 61 | |
| 2015 | Kimberley Gaal | "The Nexus Tree" | CSFG (The Never Never Land) | |
| 2015 | D. K. Mok | "The Heart of the Labyrinth" | Sorin Suciu (In Memory: A Tribute to Sir Terry Pratchett) | |
| 2015 | Faith Mudge | "Blueblood" | Ticonderoga Publications (Hear Me Roar) | |
| 2015 | Marlee Jane Ward | Welcome to Orphancorp | Seizure | |
| 2016 | Leife Shallcross* | "Pretty Jennie Greenteeth" | Belladonna Publishing (Strange Little Girls) | |
| 2016 | Lisa L. Hannett | "A Right Pretty Mate" | PS Australia (Dreaming in the Dark) | |
| 2016 | Jack Nicholls | "Dune Time" | Tor.com | |
| 2016 | Shauna O'Meara | "No One Here is Going to Save You" | FableCroft Publishing (In Your Face) | |
| 2016 | Tansy Rayner Roberts | "Did We Break the End of the World" | Twelfth Planet Press (Defying Doomsday) | |
| 2017 | Tansy Rayner Roberts* | Girl Reporter | Book Smugglers | |
| 2017 | Amie Kaufman | "One Small Step" | HarperCollins Australia (Begin, End, Begin: A #LoveOzYA Anthology) | |
| 2017 | Will Kostakis | "I Can See the Ending" | HarperCollins Australia (Begin, End, Begin: A #LoveOzYA Anthology) | |
| 2017 | Jaclyn Moriarty | "Competition Entry #349" | HarperCollins Australia (Begin, End, Begin: A #LoveOzYA Anthology) | |
| 2017 | Michael Pryor | "First Casualty" | HarperCollins Australia (Begin, End, Begin: A #LoveOzYA Anthology) | |
| 2017 | Lili Wilkinson | "Oona Underground" | HarperCollins Australia (Begin, End, Begin: A #LoveOzYA Anthology) | |
| 2018 | Shauna O'Meara* | "The Sea-Maker of Darmid Bay" | Interzone (#277) | |
| 2018 | Lee Cope | "A Robot Like Me" | Twelfth Planet Press (Mother of Invention) | |
| 2018 | D. K. Mok | "The Moon Collector" | Owl Hollow Press (Under the Full Moon's Light) | |
| 2018 | Anya Ow | "Eight Step Koan" | Ate Bit Bear (Sword and Sonnet) | |
| 2018 | Deborah Sheldon | "For Weirdless Days and Weary Nights" | Breach 08 | |
| 2019 | Jo Hart | The Jindabyne Secret | Deadset Press | |
| 2019 | K. S. Nikakis | Glass-Heart | SOV Media | |
| 2019 | Tansy Rayner Roberts | "Dragon By Subscription" | (self-published on Patreon) | |
| 2019 | Andrea Teare | "Seaweed" | Breach 11 | |
| 2019 | Ellen van Neerven | "Each City" | Walker Books Australia (Kindred: 12 Queer #LoveOzYA Stories) | |
| 2019 | Marlee Jane Ward | "Rats" | Walker Books Australia (Kindred: 12 Queer #LoveOzYA Stories) | |
| 2020 | Nikky Lee* | "Dingo & Sister" | Andromeda Spaceways Magazine (#78) | |
| 2020 | Nikky Lee | "Ram's Revenge" | Deadset Press (Aries) | |
| 2020 | Juliet Marillier | "Pea Soup" | Serenity Press (Mother Thorn and Other Tales of Courage and Kindness) | |
| 2020 | Juliet Marillier | "The Witching Well" | Serenity Press (Mother Thorn and Other Tales of Courage and Kindness) | |
| 2020 | Freya Marske | "Eat Prey, Love" | CSFG Publishing (Unnatural Order) | |
| 2020 | Tansy Rayner Roberts | "Kids These Days" | Twelfth Planet Press (Rebuilding Tomorrow) | |
| 2021 | Lisa Fuller* | "Don't Look!" | Wakefield Press (Hometown Haunts: #LoveOzYA Horror Tales) | |
| 2021 | Marianna Shek | "Hunger" | Wakefield Press (Hometown Haunts: #LoveOzYA Horror Tales) | |
| 2021 | Pamela Jeffs | "Of Slaves and Lions" | Deadset Press (Stories of Survival) | |
| 2021 | Emma Osborne | "Slaughterhouse Boys" | Wakefield Press (Hometown Haunts: #LoveOzYA Horror Tales) | |
| 2021 | Tansy Rayner Roberts | "Way-bread Rising" | Deadset Press (Stories of Survival) | |
| 2021 | Tania Fordwalker | "The Woods Echo Back" | Beneath Ceaseless Skies (#331), 3 Jun 2021 | |

== See also ==
- Ditmar Award, an Australian science fiction award established in 1969
