= Chelsea Watego =

Aboriginal Australian academic and writer

- Born: 1978 or 1979 (age 46–47); Brisbane, Queensland, Australia

Academic background
- Education: University of Queensland (B.Applied Health Science [Hons], PhD)
- Thesis: "When you're black, they look at you harder": narrating Aboriginality within public health (2007)
- Doctoral advisor: Mark Brough; Leonie Cox; Megan Jennaway

Academic work
- Discipline: Indigenous Australian health
- Institutions: Queensland University of Technology

Chelsea Joanne Ruth Watego (formerly Bond, born 1978/1979) is an Aboriginal Australian academic and writer. She is a Mununjali Yugambeh and South Sea Islander woman and is currently Professor of Indigenous Health at Queensland University of Technology. Her first book, Another Day in the Colony, was published in 2021.

== Personal life ==
Watego was born in 1978 or 1979 in Brisbane, Queensland, and is the daughter of Vern and Elaine Watego. Vern was Mununjali Yugambeh (an Australian Aboriginal group whose traditional lands are located around Beaudesert in South East Queensland) and South Sea Islander, while Elaine is of English and Irish descent. Through Vern, her great-great-great-grandfather was Bilin Bilin, a well-known Yugambeh man and diplomat who died in 1901.

She has five children (Kihi, Matt, Eliakim, Vernon and George) with her ex-husband, Matthew Kihi Toka Bond.

== Academic career ==
Watego studied a Bachelor of Applied Health Science at the University of Queensland (UQ), graduating with honours in 2001. In 2007, she received her Doctor of Philosophy for her thesis, '"When you're black, they look at you harder": narrating Aboriginality within public health,' under the supervision of Mark Brough, Leonie Cox and Megan Jennaway.

She has since worked as a researcher and lecturer at both UQ and Queensland University of Technology (QUT). She began her academic career at UQ, and worked there as Principal Research Fellow in the School of Social Sciences. However, in 2019 she lodged a race and sex discrimination complaint against UQ and left the university for QUT, where she began work as Professor of Indigenous Health on 26 July 2021. As of 2021, she is also a director and principal researcher at the Institute for Collaborative Race Research.

She has received awards for her scholarship, particularly the 2009 NAIDOC Award for Scholar of the Year and the 2012 Lowitja Institute Emerging Aboriginal and Torres Strait Islander Researcher Award. The focus of her academic work has been described as "interpreting and privileging Indigenous experiences of the health system, including critically examining the role of Aboriginal health workers, the narratives of Indigeneity produced within public health, and advocating for strength based community development approaches to Indigenous health promotion practice". She has also worked prominently on the development of the field of Indigenist health humanities, for which she received a $1.7 million grant in 2021.

== Media and writing work ==
Watego has written for numerous publications including IndigenousX, NITV, ABC News, Meanjin, SBS, The Guardian and The Conversation. Her essay Mythologies of Aboriginal Culture was nominated for the 2016 Horne Prize, but lost to Anna Spargo-Ryan's The Suicide Gene.

From 2017 to 2020, she hosted Wild Black Women with Angelina Hurley on 98.9 FM in Brisbane. The show received particular publicity for its interview of Trevor Noah in 2019. In the episode, he and the hosts discussed a controversial joke he made in 2013 about Aboriginal women which Anita Heiss had called "disgusting and offensive". Noah received criticism for refusing to apologise for the joke.

Watego has also often spoken at events and on panels, receiving praise particularly for a 2019 appearance at La Trobe University during which she spoke out against structural racism.

In 2021, her first book, Another Day in the Colony, was published by University of Queensland Press. It is a collection of essays which "[examine] the ongoing and daily racism faced by First Nations peoples in so-called Australia," and has received positive reviews. Declan Fry in The Guardian described it as "a fierce manifesto for First Nations to flourish," Kara Nicholson for "Readings" labelled it a "collection of sharply written, fiercely intelligent and engaging essays" and "absolutely essential reading," and Monique Grbec in Kill Your Darlings declared that it "[gave] agency, dignity and power in response to the shared experience of racism" and called it "Deadly". At the 2022 Queensland Literary Awards it won the People’s Choice Queensland Book of the Year Award and was shortlisted for the Queensland Premier's Award for a Work of State Significance and Nonfiction. It was shortlisted for the 2022 Victorian Premier's Literary Awards for both Indigenous Writing and Nonfiction and for the 2022 Prime Minister's Literary Award for Nonfiction. It was also longlisted for the Stella Prize in 2022 and shortlisted for the Douglas Stewart Prize for Non-Fiction and the Indigenous Writers' Prize at the 2023 New South Wales Premier's Literary Awards.

Her second book, Black thoughts matter, was published in 2025.

== Discrimination allegations ==
In 2018, Watego was arrested on charges of obstructing police and refusing to leave a licensed premise, after being forcibly removed from The Beat nightclub in Fortitude Valley. She subsequently pleaded guilty to a charge of public nuisance. Watego stated the arrest left her with post-traumatic stress disorder (PTSD). She later lodged a racial discrimination complaint against Queensland Police with the Queensland Civil and Administrative Tribunal (QCAT), retaining George Newhouse as her solicitor. In October 2022, QCAT dismissed her complaint, with Newhouse stating that "the tribunal member felt that there wasn't enough evidence to convince him that the decisions that the police made were on the basis of race". The Tribunal found Professor Watego detailed this incident in her book Another Day in the Colony but "... what is said in the book about the actions of the second and third respondents is untrue." and "... naming them could establish a cause of action in defamation ...". On 2 August 2023 the Tribunal found that the complaint was so devoid of merit that it warranted an award of costs against the complainaint in the interests of justice.

In 2019, Watego lodged racial and sex discrimination complaints against the University of Queensland, alleging that the university had provided an inadequate workspace for her team. She withdrew the complaints in 2021, criticising the National Tertiary Education Union for what she described as a lack of legal support.

== Bibliography ==
- Another Day in the Colony: 2021
- Black thoughts matter: 2025
