= Snow-White and Rose-Red =

German fairy tale

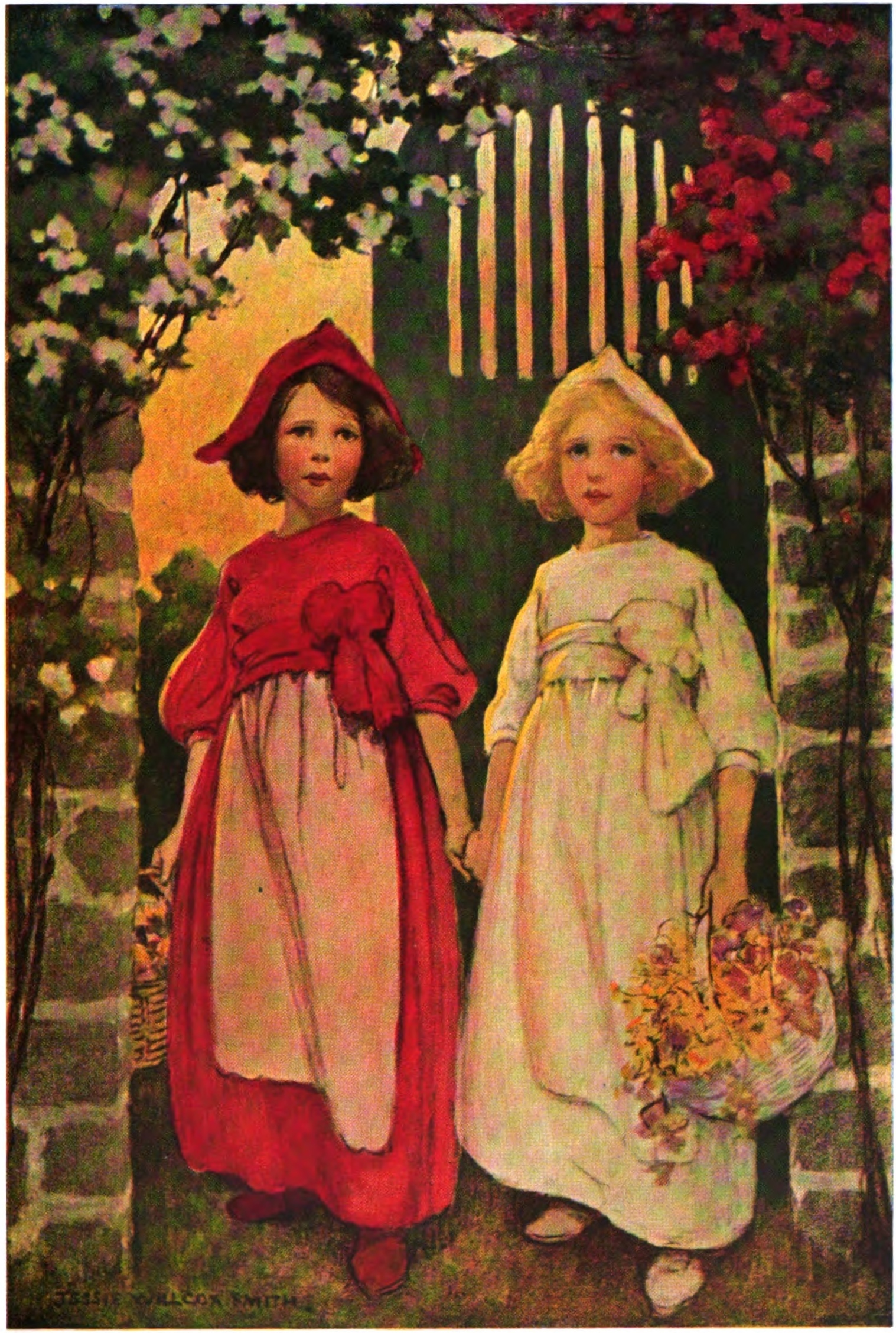
- Snow-White and Rose-Red by Jessie Willcox Smith, 1911

Folk tale
- Name: Snow-White and Rose-Red
- Aarne–Thompson grouping: ATU 426 (The Two Girls, the Bear and the Dwarf)
- Region: Germany
- Published in: Kinder- und Hausmärchen by the Brothers Grimm

"Snow-White and Rose-Red" (German: Schneeweißchen und Rosenrot) is a German fairy tale. The best-known version is the one collected by the Brothers Grimm in 1837 in the third edition of their collection Grimm's Fairy Tales (KHM 161). It was first published by Wilhelm Grimm in 1827 in Wilhelm Hauff's Märchen-Almanach. An older, somewhat shorter version, "The Ungrateful Dwarf", was written by Caroline Stahl (1776–1837). Indeed, that appears to be the oldest variant; no previous oral version is known, although several have been collected since its publication in 1818. Oral versions are very limited regionally. The tale is of Aarne–Thompson type 426 ("The Two Girls, the Bear, and the Dwarf").

Despite having a character with the same name, this story is not related to the Brothers Grimm fairy tale "Snow White" that provided the basis for the 1937 Walt Disney animated film Snow White and the Seven Dwarves. The modern German name of that heroine is Schneewittchen rather than Schneeweißchen. This story has little in common but the similar name of its fair-skinned girl.

== Plot ==
Snow-White and Rose-Red are two little girls living with their mother, a poor widow, in a small cottage by the woods. Snow-White is quiet and shy and prefers to spend her time indoors, doing housework and reading. Rose-Red is outspoken, lively and cheerful, and prefers to be outside. They are both very good girls who love each other and their mother dearly, and their mother is very fond of them as well.

One winter night, there is a knock at the door. Rose-Red opens the door to find a bear. At first, she is terrified, but the bear tells her not to be afraid. "I'm half frozen and I merely want to warm up a little at your place," he says. They let the bear in, and he lies down in front of the fire. Snow-White and Rose-Red beat the snow off the bear, and they quickly become quite friendly with him. They play with the bear and roll him around playfully. They let the bear spend the night in front of the fire. In the morning, he leaves trotting out into the woods. The bear comes back every night for the rest of that winter and the family grows used to him.

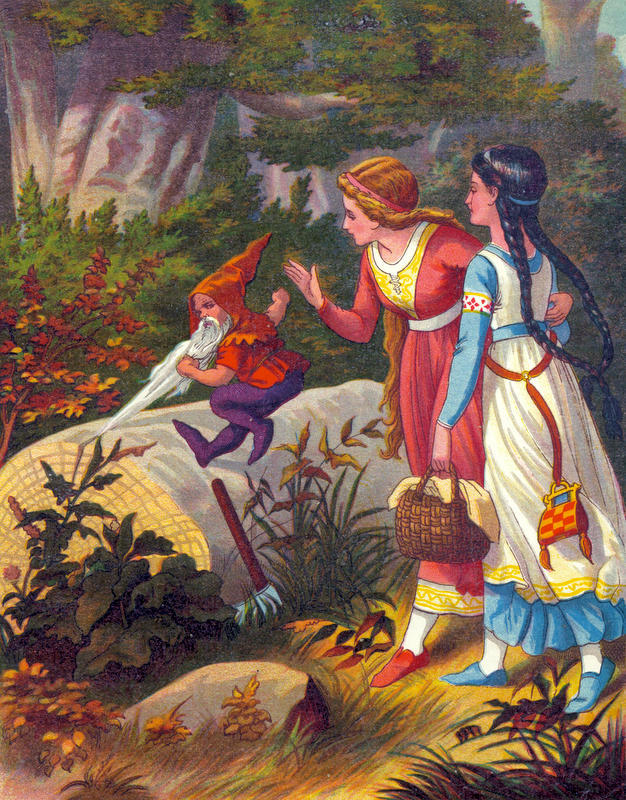
Illustration for Josephine Pollard's book Hours in Fairy Land, published in 1883

When summer comes, the bear tells them that he must go away for a while to guard his treasure from a wicked dwarf. During the summer, when the girls are walking through the forest, they find a dwarf whose beard is stuck in a tree. The girls rescue him by cutting his beard free, but the dwarf is ungrateful and yells at them for cutting his beautiful beard. The girls encounter the dwarf several times that summer and rescue him from some peril each time, for which he is ungrateful.

Then one day, they meet the dwarf once again. This time, he is terrified because the bear is about to kill him. The dwarf pleads with the bear and begs it to eat the girls. Instead, the bear pays no heed to his plea and kills the dwarf with one swipe of his paw. Instantly, the bear turns into a prince. The dwarf had previously put a spell on the prince by stealing his precious stones and turning him into a bear. The curse is broken with the death of the dwarf. Snow-White marries the prince and Rose-Red marries the prince's brother.

== Analysis ==
=== Tale type ===
The tale is classified in the international Aarne–Thompson–Uther Index as tale type ATU 426, "The Two Girls, the Bear, and the Dwarf": a pair of sisters welcome a bear into their house; the next summer, the girls rescue an ungrateful dwarf three times; at the end of the tale, the bear defeats the dwarf (who cursed him in the first place) and becomes a human prince.

According to scholars Johannes Bolte, Jiří Polívka, Stith Thompson, and Hans-Jörg Uther, the tale, in the Grimm's compilation, originated from a story written by author Karoline Stahl and published in 1818.

=== Variants ===
In an early analysis, German scholar Kurt Ranke noted that the existing variants originated from "Central Europe": Flanders, France, Germany and Switzerland.

==== Germanic languages ====
German folklorist Hans-Jörg Uther, in the Folktale Catalogue of the German-speaking Area, classifies the tale as type ATU 426, Schneeweißchen und Rosenrot ("Snow-White and Rose-Red"), which is sparsely attested in Germanophone areas. In addition, Kurt Ranke argued that the Grimm's tale influenced variants collected later, such as Wittrösken und Rautrösken.

According to Frisian scholar Jurjen van der Kooi, in the Catalogue of Frisian Folktales, the tale type is also attested in Friesland, but the heroines are named Blauwoogje ("Blue-Eyes") and Bruin-oogje ("Brown-Eyes"). In addition, Dutch scholar Theo Meder published a Dutch tale titled Rozerood en Lelieblank ("Rose-Red and Lily-White"), from a storyteller from Driebergen, Utrecht, who sent it in 1892 to linguist Gerrit Jacob Boekenoogen.

Johannes Bolte and Jiří Polívka cited a tale titled Rozenroodje, collected by J. F. Vincx from Hageland (Flanders).

In a dialectal German tale from Bobda, Banat, with the title Schneeweißje un Rosenrot, a woman lives in the forest with her two daughters, Schneeweißje and Rosenrot. One night, a bear appears to them and they welcome the animal to spend the winter with them. When spring comes, the bear prepares to leave, and gives the girls a tuft of its hairs. One day, the girls find in the forest a hurt eagle. They cover the eagle with a white shawl and the bird gives them a feather to throw in the air to summon it. Sometime later, a witch goes to attack the girls. The pair then rub the hairs to summon the bear and it comes to kill the witch. Suddenly, a large dragon appears, and the girls toss the eagle's feather in the air. The bird comes and claws out the dragon's eyes. After the danger is over, the bear and the eagle become handsome princes, who marry Schneeweißje and Rosenrot.

==== Slavic languages ====
The tale type is also attested in the East Slavic Folktale Classification (Russian: СУС, romanized: SUS), indexed as type SUS 426, "Две девушки, медведь (волк) и карлик" ("Two Girls, the Bear/Wolf and the Dwarf"), but only in Russia and Ukraine.

Philologist and folklorist Julian Krzyżanowski, establisher of the Polish Folktale Catalogue according to the international index, located a single Polish variant of type 426, Narzeczony niedźwiedź ("The Bear Groom"). However, Krzyżanowski indicated that the tale was a literary reworking that excised the dwarf and introduced other characters.

==== Other areas ====
According to the Latvian Folktale Catalogue, a similar story is found in Latvia, indexed as tale type 426, Lācis — princis ("Bear Prince"): two girls shelter a bear and rescue a dwarf; the bear defeats the dwarf and regains human form.

French scholars Paul Delarue and Marie-Louise Thèneze, establishers of the French folktale catalogue, reported only two variants in France of tale type ATU 426, Les deux fillettes, l'ours et le nain ("The Two Little Girls, the Bear and the Dwarf"), which they considered to be retellings of the Grimm's story.

== Other versions ==
=== Stories ===
- "Schneeweißchen und Rosenrot" by the Brothers Grimm (German language)
- "Snow-White and Rose-Red"; May Sellar, transl., Andrew Lang, ed., The Blue Fairy Book, 1889
- Snow-White and Rose-Red and the Big Black Bear, by Clifton Johnson (1913)
- "Snow-White and Rose-Red"; Margaret Hunt, transl., Grimm's Household Tales, Vol. 2, No. 161
- "Snow-White and Rose-Red" by Edith Wyatt – short story
- Forsyth, Kate, and Lorena Carrington. Snow-White & Rose-Red & Other Tales of Kind Young Women. Serenity Press, 2020.

=== Novels ===
- Snow White and Rose Red by Patricia C. Wrede, in the Fairy Tale Series created by Terri Windling – 1989 fantasy novel based on the tale and set in medieval England
- The Shadow of the Bear by Regina Doman – 1997 novel based on the tale and set in contemporary New York City.
- Tender Morsels by Margo Lanagan – 2008 fantasy novel based on the tale
- Snow & Rose by Emily Winfield Martin, Random House, October 10, 2017
- Rose Crown by Nina Clare - 2025 fantasy novel based on the tale, in the Fairy Tale Series All that Glitters

=== Poetry ===
- Enszer, Julie (9 April 2014). "Five Feminist Poems for National Poetry Month: 2. "Rose and Snow Tell the Field Their Troubles"". Ms. Magazine.
- Welliver, Kim (2021). "Snow White, Rose Red". Fairy Tale Review. 17 (1): 99–103. doi:10.13110/fairtalerevi.17.1.0099. S2CID 234203231. Project MUSE 812771 ProQuest 2538408847.

=== Graphic novels or comic books ===
- Fables (2002–2024), by Bill Willingham, featuring Snow White and Rose Red as two of the main characters

=== Films ===
- Schneeweisschen und Rosenrot (1955) West German film directed by Erich Kobler.
- Beni Bara, Shiro Bara (1975) Japanese animated film directed by Kazuo Nomura and Yoshiyuki Tomino.
- Schneeweißchen und Rosenrot (1979) East German film directed by Siegfried Hartmann.
- Schneeweißchen und Rosenrot (1984) West German film directed by Rita-Maria Nowotny.

=== Television ===
- Snow White and Rose Red (1954), silhouette animation made by Lotte Reiniger for the BBC.
- Grimm's Fairy Tale Classics (1987-1989), episode 7.
- Simsala Grimm (1999-2010), season 3, episode 44.
- Schneeweißchen und Rosenrot (2012) TV movie directed by Sebastian Grobler, part of the series Sechs auf einen Streich.

=== Music ===
- Snow White and Rose Red (2019), Single inspired by the tale, from symphonic-metal music group Blackbriar featuring Ulli Perhonen.

== Gallery ==
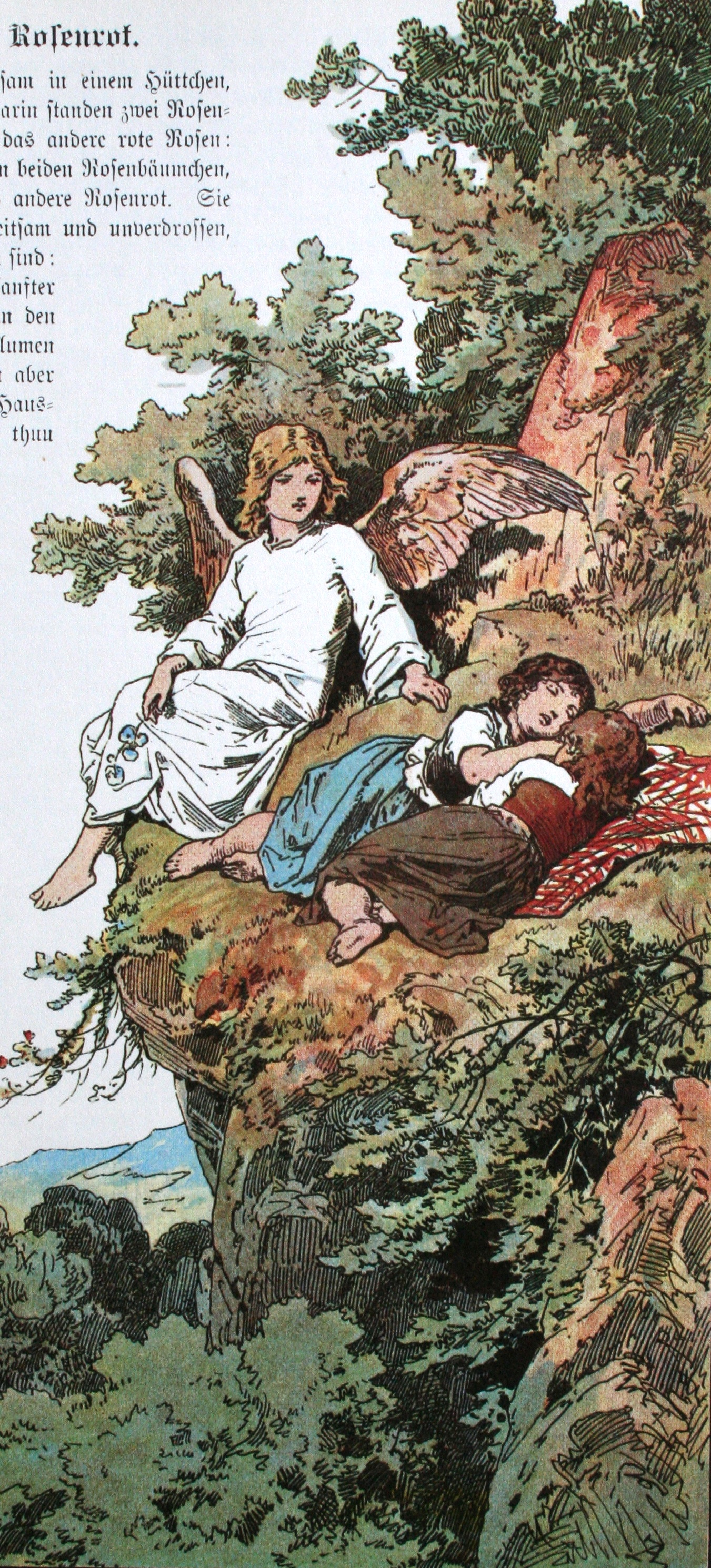
Snow-white and Rose-red, by Alexander Zick

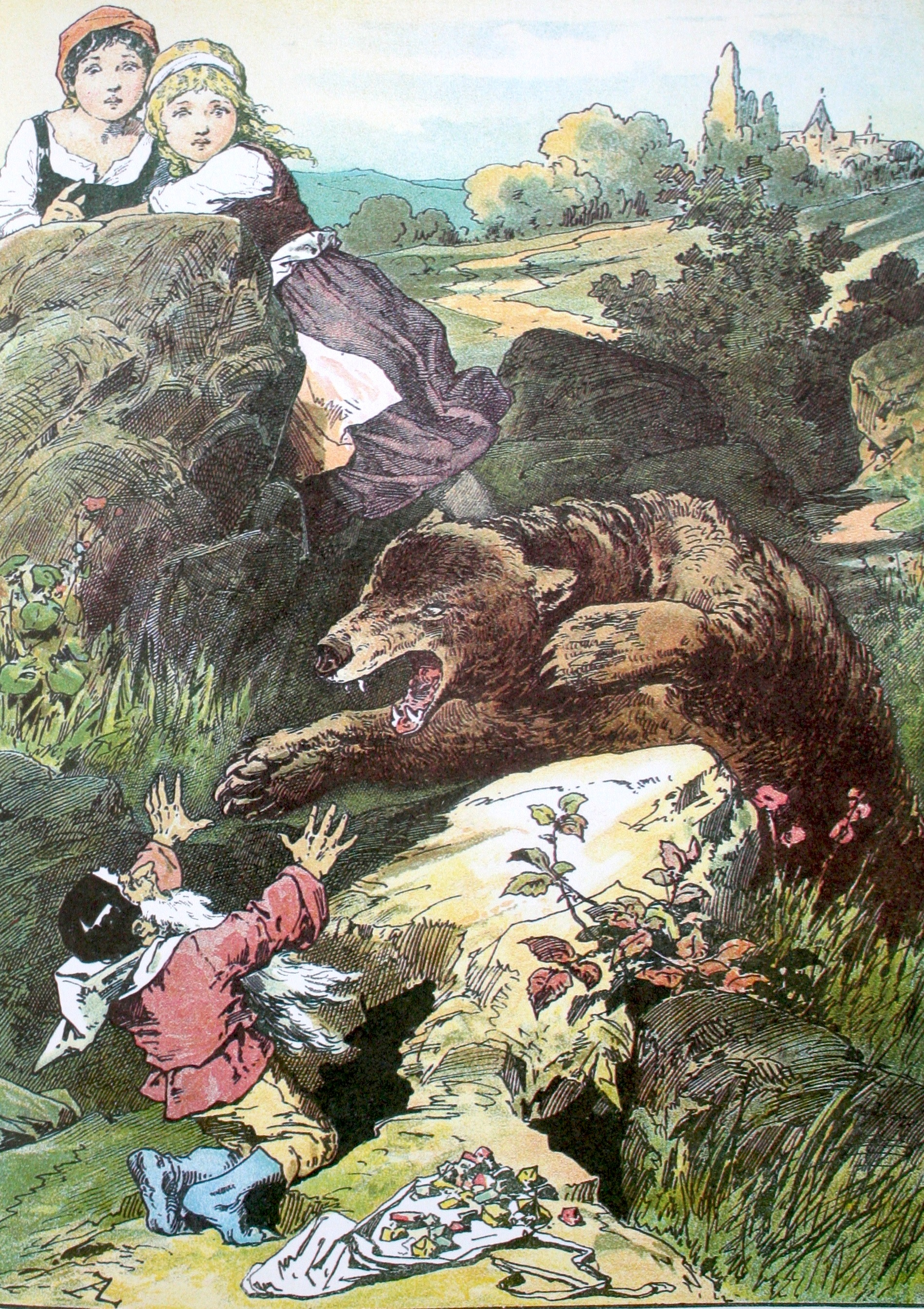
Illustration by Alexander Zick

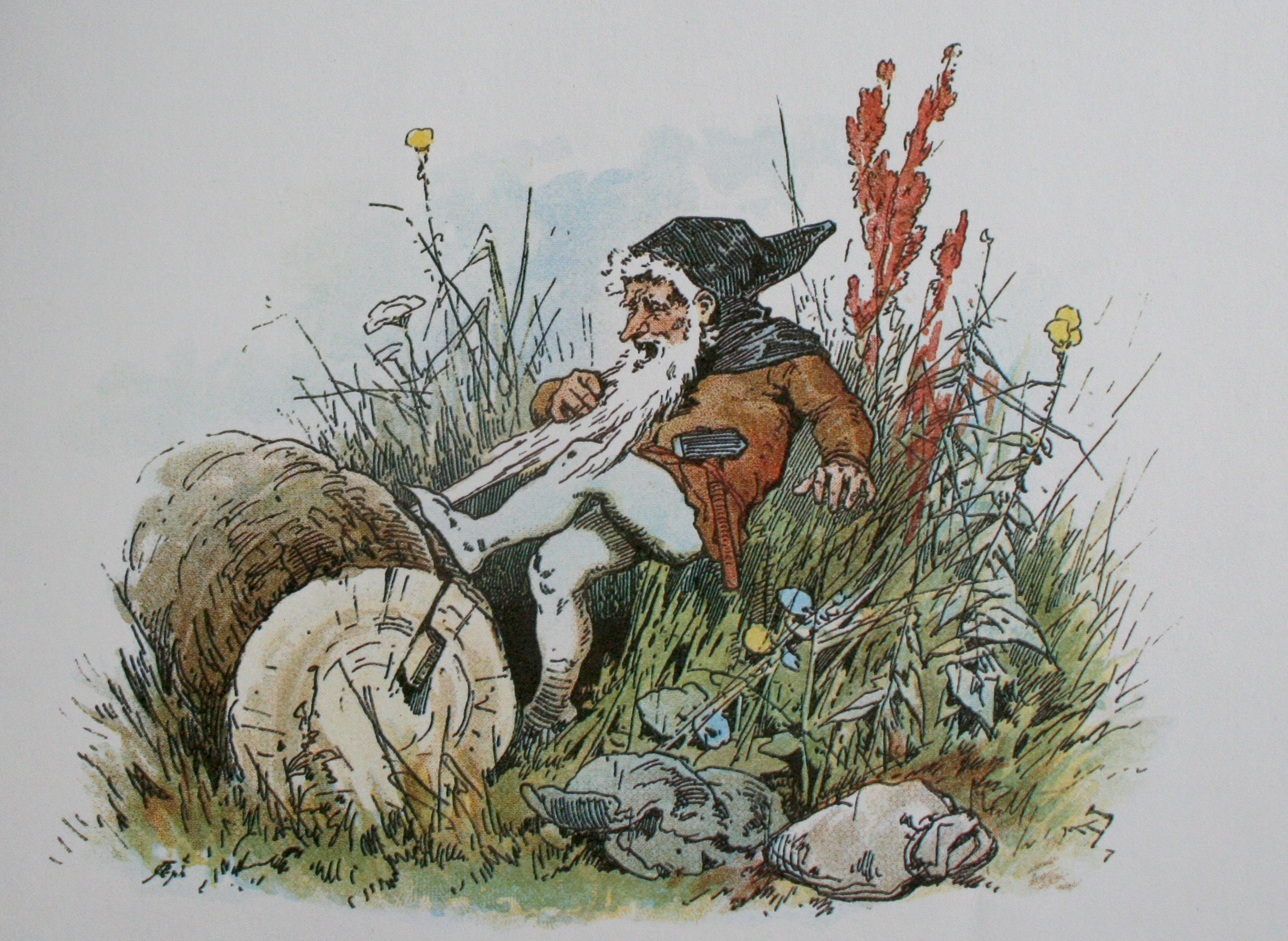
Illustration by Alexander Zick

== See also ==
- Cupid and Psyche
- Beauty and the Beast
- Graciosa and Percinet
- East of the Sun and West of the Moon

== Bibliography ==
- Friedenthal, Andrew J (2012). "The Lost Sister: Lesbian Eroticism and Female Empowerment in 'Snow White and Rose Red'". In Turner, Kay (ed.). Transgressive Tales: Queering the Grimms. Wayne State University Press. pp. 161–178. ISBN 978-0-8143-3810-0.
- Ness, Mari (25 January 2018). "Creating a Tale of Sisterhood: Snow-White and Rose-Red | Tor.com". Tor.com.
- "Snow White and Rose Red Fairytale Analysis". SLAP HAPPY LARRY. 2 January 2020.
- "Snow Queen Annotated Tale". Sur La Lune.
- Zahner-Roloff, Lee (1992). "'Snow White and Rose Red': Contained Oppositions". In Stein, Murray; Corbett, Lionel (eds.). Psyche's Stories, Volume 2: Modern Jungian Interpretations of Fairy Tales. Chiron Publications. pp. 111–122. ISBN 978-1-63051-006-0.
