= Once a Month, On a Sunday =

- Short story by Ian McHugh
- Country: Australia
- Language: English
- Genre: Fantasy

Publication
- Published in: Andromeda Spaceways Inflight Magazine #40
- Publication type: Periodical
- Publisher: ASIM Collective
- Media type: Print (magazine)
- Publication date: 2009

"Once a Month, On a Sunday" is a 2009 fantasy short story by Australian writer Ian McHugh.

== Background ==
"Once a Month, On a Sunday" was first published in 2009 in Andromeda Spaceways Inflight Magazine #40, edited by Simon Petrie and published by the ASIM Collective. It was published alongside nine other stories by the authors K. T. McRae, Melissa White, Jason Stoddard, Ruskin Drake, Darren Goossens, Dan McCormick, Felicity Dowker, K. C. Shaw, and Douglas A. Van Belle. "Once a Month, On a Sunday" joint-won the 2009 Aurealis Award for best fantasy short story along with "Father's Kill" by Christopher Green and was a short-list nominee for the 2009 Aurealis Award for best young-adult short story but lost to Cat Sparks' "Seventeen".
