= Aurealis Award for Best Fantasy Novella =

Australian fantasy writing award

Aurealis Award for best fantasy novella
- Awarded for: Excellence in fantasy fiction novels
- Country: Australia
- Presented by: Chimaera Publications, Continuum Foundation
- First award: 2015
- Currently held by: Freya Marske
- Website: Official site

The Aurealis Awards are presented annually by the Australia-based Chimaera Publications and WASFF to published works in order to "recognise the achievements of Australian science fiction, fantasy, horror writers". To qualify, a work must have been first published by an Australian citizen or permanent resident between 1 January and 31 December of the corresponding year; the presentation ceremony is held the following year. It has grown from a small function of around 20 people to a two-day event attended by over 200 people.

Since their creation in 1995, awards have been given in various categories of speculative fiction. Categories currently include science fiction, fantasy, horror, speculative young adult fiction—with separate awards for novels and short fiction—collections, anthologies, illustrative works or graphic novels, children's books, and an award for excellence in speculative fiction. The awards have attracted the attention of publishers by setting down a benchmark in science fiction and fantasy. The continued sponsorship by publishers such as HarperCollins and Orbit has identified the award as an honour to be taken seriously.

The results are decided by a panel of judges from a list of submitted nominees; the long-list of nominees is reduced to a short-list of finalists. Ties can occur if the panel decides both entries show equal merit, however they are encouraged to choose a single winner. The judges are selected from a public application process by the Award's management team.

This article lists all the short-list nominees and winners in the best fantasy novella category. Alan Baxter and Tansy Rayner Roberts share the record for most nominations (3), while Jason Fischer, Stephanie Gunn, Nikky Lee, Kirstyn McDermott, and Angela Slatter follow, each having been nominated twice. This is as of the 2021 Awards, as the winners were announced in late May 2022.

== Winners and nominees ==
In the following table, the years correspond to the year of the story's eligibility; the ceremonies are always held the following year. Each year links to the corresponding "year in literature" article. Entries with a blue background have won the award; those with a white background are the nominees on the short-list. If the short story was originally published in a book with other stories rather than by itself or in a magazine, the book title is included after the publisher's name.

* Winners and joint winners
* Nominees on the shortlist

Year	Author(s)	Novella	Publisher or publication	Ref
2015	Jason Fischer*	"Defy the Grey Kings"	Beneath Ceaseless Skies (#180)	
2015	Steve Cameron	"Lodloc and The Bear"	coeur de lion (Dimension6)	
2015	Stephanie Gunn	"Broken Glass"	Ticonderoga Publications (Hear Me Roar)	
2015	Stephanie Gunn	"The Flowers that Bloom Where Blood Touches the Earth"	Ticonderoga Publications (Bloodlines)	
2015	Dmetri Kakmi	"Haunting Matilda"	Horror Australis (Cthulhu: Deep Down Under)	
2015	Angela Slatter	"Of Sorrow and Such"	Tor.com	
2016	Andrea K. Höst*	"Forfeit"	(self-published) (The Towers, the moon)	
2016	Alan Baxter	"Raven's First Flight"	Cohesion Press (SNAFU: Black Ops)	
2016	Jason Fischer	"By the Laws of Crab and Woman"	Review of Australian Fiction (Vol 17, No 6)	
2016	Rose Mulready	The Bonobo's Dream	Seizure Press	
2016	Kirstyn McDermott	"Burnt Sugar"	PS Publishing (Dreaming in the Dark)	
2016	Angela Slatter	"Finnegan's Field"	Tor.com	
2017	Devin Madson*	In Shadows We Fall	(self-published)	
2017	Alan Baxter	The Book Club	PS Publishing	
2017	Nathan Burrage	"Remnants"	coeur de lion (Dimension6 11)	
2017	Kate Forsyth & Kim Wilkins	The Silver Well	Ticonderoga Publications	
2017	Kirstyn McDermott	"Braid"	Review of Australian Fiction (Vol 24, No 1)	
2017	Faith Mudge	Humanity for Beginners	Less Than Three Press	
2018	Garth Nix*	"The Sword in the Stone"	Penguin Random House Australia (The Book of Magic)	
2018	Michael Gardner	"This Side of the Wall"	Metaphorosis Magazine (January 2018)	
2018	Juliet Marillier	"Beautiful"	Ticonderoga Publications (Aurum)	
2018	Tansy Rayner Roberts	Merry Happy Valkyrie	Twelfth Planet Press	
2018	David Versace	"The Dressmaker and the Colonel's Coat"	(self-published) (Mnemo's Memory and Other Fantastic Tales)	
2018	Janeen Webb	The Dragon's Child	PS Publishing	
2019	Shauna O'Meara*	"Scapes Made of Diamond"	Interzone (#280)	
2019	J. S. Breukelaar	"Like Ripples on a Blank Shore"	Meerkat Press (Cohesion: Stories)	
2019	Ephiny Gale	"The Orchard"	Andromeda Spaceways Magazine (#76)	
2019	Chris Mason	"Out of Darkness"	Things in the Well (Tales of the Lost Vol 1)	
2019	Michael Pryor	"To Hell and Back"	Aurealis (#120)	
2020	Nikky Lee*	"Dingo and Sister"	Andromeda Spaceways Magazine (#78)	
2020	Thoraiya Dyer	"Generation Gap"	Clarkesworld (#161)	
2020	Lisa L. Hannett	"By Touch and By Glance"	Ticonderoga Publications (Songs for Dark Seasons)	
2020	Nikky Lee	"Karkinos"	Deadset Press (Cancer)	
2020	Tansy Rayner Roberts	The Frost Fair Affair	(self-published)	
2021	Amy Laurens*	Bones of the Sea	Inkprint Press	
2021	Tansy Rayner Roberts	"Echo and Narcissus"	Sheep Might Fly	
2021	Rebecca Fraser	"The Little One"	IFWG (Coralesque and Other Tales to Disturb and Distract)	
2021	Alan Baxter	"Mother in Bloom"	13th Dragon Books (The Gulp)	
2021	Suzanne J. Willis	The Scarab Children of Montague	Falstaff Books	
2022	Kirstyn McDermott	Winterbloom	Brain Jar Press	
2022	Lee Cope	"The Ocean, the Lighthouse Keeper, and the Sunset"	FableCroft Publishing	
2022	Dorothy-Jane Daniels	Hovering	Luna Press	
2022	Kathleen Jennings	"Merry in Time"	Beneath Ceaseless Skies #352	
2022	Faith Mudge	"Among the Faded Woods"	FableCroft Publishing	
2022	Angela Slatter	The Bone Lantern	PS Publishing	
2023	Tansy Rayner Roberts	Gate sinister	(self-published)	
2023	Alan Baxter	The leaves forget	Absinthe Books	
2023	J. S. Breukelaar	"Hole World"	Apex Magazine #141	
2023	Taylen Carver	The wizard must be stopped!	Stores Rule Press	
2023	T. R. Napper	"A marked man"	Grimdark Magazine #36	
2023	Tansy Rayner Roberts	A wicked blade	(self-published)	
2024	Will Greatwich	"Another Tide"	Beneath Ceaseless Skies #420, Firkin Press	
2024	Nikky Lee	"Doors"	Don't Forget to Shut the Gate, Northshore Press	
2024	Sue-Ellen Pashley	Talon Marked	Deadset Press	
2024	Tansy Rayner Roberts	"A Daredevil Duchess’s Guide to Castle Hauntings"	Castle of Secrets (self-published)	
2024	Tansy Rayner Roberts	Hotel Charybdis	(self-published)	
2024	Craig Rosenberg	"The Good Old Days"	Uncertainties, Swan River Press	
2025	Freya Marske	Cinder House	Pan Macmillan	
2025	Lee Cope	Hol(l)o(w)metabolism	Whimsy and Metaphor Enterprises	
2025	Jessica A. McMinn	Parasitic Omens	(self-published)	
2025	Leanbh Pearson	Trickster Tales	Brigid's Gate Press	
2025	Tansy Rayner Roberts	"Crown Tourney"	Crown Tourney: Ten Tales of Deadly Damsels, Cursed Castles and Edged Weapons (self-published)	

== See also ==
- Ditmar Award, an Australian science fiction award established in 1969
