= A Fine Magic =

- Short story by Margo Lanagan
- Country: Australia
- Language: English
- Genre: Fantasy

Publication
- Published in: Eidolon I
- Publication type: Anthology
- Publisher: Eidolon Books
- Media type: Print (paperback)
- Publication date: 2006

"A Fine Magic" is a 2006 fantasy short story by Australian writer Margo Lanagan.

== Publishing history ==
"A Fine Magic" was first published in 2006 in Eidolon I, edited by Jeremy G. Byrne and Jonathan Strahan and published by Eidolon Books.

It was published alongside 16 other stories by the authors Eleanor Arnason, Kim Westwood, Holly Phillips, Elizabeth Bear, Chris Lawson, Simon Brown, Jeff VanderMeer, Hal Duncan, Carol Ryles, Grace Dugan, Deborah Biancotti, Alistair Ong, Lucy Sussex, Tim Pratt, Deborah Roggie, and William R. Eakin.

In 2007 it was republished in Fantasy: The Best of the Year: 2007 Edition, edited by Rich Horton and published by Wildside Press under their Cosmos Books imprint.

"A Fine Magic" won the 2006 Aurealis Award for best fantasy short story and finished 15th in the 2007 Locus Awards for best short story.

The story was subsequently included in the author's short story collection Yellowcake (2011).

== See also ==
- 2006 in Australian literature
