= Cinder House =

2025 novella by Freya Marske

Cinder House is a 2025 fantasy novella by Freya Marske, retelling "Cinderella" as a ghost story. It was first published by Tordotcom.

== Synopsis ==
When Ella is sixteen, she and her father are both murdered by her stepmother. Her father is gone, but Ella rises as a ghost — bound to the house which her stepmother inherited, and visible only to its owners.

== Reception ==
Cinder House won the Aurealis Award for Best Fantasy Novella of 2025, and was a finalist for the 2026 Hugo Award for Best Novella, and the 2026 Locus Award for Best Novella.

Publishers Weekly called the story "as strong, beautiful, and clever" as Ella. Kirkus Reviews drew parallels between Ella's compulsion to obey the house's owners and Gail Carson Levine's Ella Enchanted, and commended Marske for "explor[ing] the ways limited mobility and accessibility can erode one's sense of self", and for "subvert[ing] the 'doting father' and 'wicked stepmother' archetypes."

Strange Horizons lauded it as "appealing, to the point, and hard to put down", while Locus considered it to be "tender (and) full of quiet longing", with "a finale that gently asks the reader to reconsider what a 'happy ending' might look like," and noted that it is an "elegantly written, unconventional love story" that "drop(s) hints about a wider, richly detailed world inhabited by fey, humans, magicians, and other liminal beings." Reactor emphasized that Marske spotlights "what it means, at its core, to be designated cinder. Ash, remnant," and observed the depiction of "sex through the lens of somebody who does not have access to a body in the same way most living, abled people do."
