= Father's Kill =

2009 fantasy short story by Australian author Christopher Green

- Short story by Christopher Green
- Country: Australia
- Language: English
- Genre: Fantasy short story

Publication
- Published in: Beneath Ceaseless Skies #24
- Publication type: Periodical
- Publisher: Firkin Press
- Media type: Online magazine
- Publication date: 27 August 2009

"Father's Kill" is a 2009 fantasy short story by Christopher Green.

== Publication history ==
"Father's Kill" was first published on 27 August 2009 in Beneath Ceaseless Skies #24, published by Firkin Press. It was one of two stories featured in the magazine, the other being "Sorrow’s Blade" by Rita Oakes.

== Awards ==
"Father's Kill" was a joint-winner of the 2009 Aurealis Award for best fantasy short story, winning alongside Ian McHugh's "Once a Month, On a Sunday".

== Synopsis ==
To provide food for his family of three children after their mother has died, a father takes on the role of a wolf to hunt at night. But one night he doesn't return.
