= Horne Prize =

Australian literary essay award

The Horne Prize was an Australian award presented by Aēsop and The Saturday Paper from 2016 to 2020 for a literary essay of up to 3000 words on Australian life. The prize was valued at $15,000 (Australian) and named in honour of Donald Horne (1921–2005) in recognition of his contribution to literature and journalism in Australia. The inaugural winner was Anna Spargo-Ryan for The Suicide Gene.

In 2018 a guideline was introduced concerning the need for people from minority groups to tell their own stories. On learning of this restriction two judges, Anna Funder and David Marr resigned from the panel. The restriction was subsequently removed and the closing date for entries extended by one month. The winner was selected by the remaining three judges, Erik Jensen, Suzanne Santos and Marcia Langton.

In 2021, the prize's official website announced that the award would "take a break" that year, and since then no further announcements have been made regarding the prize's future, leaving it defunct as of 2023. Meg Watson in The Sydney Morning Herald speculated that the abolition of the award may have been related to Aēsop stopping funding the Next Chapter, another Australian literary initiative.

== Award winners ==
Year	Author	Title	Judges	Reference
2016	Anna Spargo-Ryan	The Suicide Gene	Erik Jensen, Marcia Langton, David Malouf, David Marr and Suzanne Santos	
2017	Kerryn Goldsworthy	The Limit of the World	Robyn Davidson, Erik Jensen, Marcia Langton, David Marr and Suzanne Santos	
2018	Daniel James	Ten More Days	Erik Jensen, Marcia Langton and Suzanne Santos	
2019	Rachael Lebeter	Diary of a Wildlife Carer	Maddison Connaughton, Anna Krien, Marcia Langton, Nam Le and Suzanne Santos	
2020	Steven Amsterdam	There and Here	Maddison Connaughton, Anna Krien, Nam Le, Suzanne Santos and Tara June Winch	

== Shortlists ==
Winners in bold.

2016

- Chelsea Bond, Mythologies of Aboriginal Culture
- Barry Jones, The Courage Party
- Anna McGahan, Brightness
- Alexandra O’Sullivan, Losing Teeth
- **Anna Spargo-Ryan, The Suicide Gene**

2017

- Alice Bishop, Coppering
- **Kerryn Goldsworthy, The Limit of the World**
- Lucas Grainger-Brown, Without Heroes
- Jennifer Mills, Swimming with Aliens
- Sam Watson, Blood on the Boundary

2018

- Melanie Cheng, All the Other Stories
- Claire G. Coleman, After the Grog War
- Joy Goodsell, Domestic Terrorism
- **Daniel James, Ten More Days**
- Fiona Wright, State Your Intentions

2019

- Claire G. Coleman, Hidden in Plain Sight
- Mick Daley, Up Expletive Hill
- Carly Findlay, In Sickness and In Health
- **Rachael Lebeter, Diary of a Wildlife Carer**
- Thomas Mayo, A Dream That Cannot Be Denied

2020

- Kgshak Akec, When Deep Roots Unearth
- **Steven Amsterdam, There and Here**
- Rachel Ang, Magnetic Fields
- Lauren Carroll Harris, Subject Line: The Storyteller
- Melanie Cheng, The Silent Pandemic
- Jessica Friedmann, Water, Everywhere
- Leah Jing McIntosh, An Australian Body
- Atul Joshi, Marsden Park
