= Karen Attard =

Australian writer

- Born: 1958 (age 67–68)
- Writing career
- Genres: Fantasy, short fiction
- Notable awards: Aurealis Award; Best fantasy short story 1995 Harvest Bay

Karen Attard (born 1958) is an Australian writer of fantasy and short fiction.

== Biography ==
Attard's first work to be published was in 1975 with a poem published by Meuse Press, entitled Like an Omen. In 1995 she published a poetry collection published by Five Islands Press entitled Whisper Dark and a short story, Harvest Bay which was featured in the Eidolon (Australian magazine) magazine. Harvest Bay won the 1995 Aurealis Award for best fantasy short story. In 1997 she released two more short stories which were both featured in the Eidolon magazine.

== Bibliography ==
=== Collections ===
- Whisper Dark (1995)

=== Poems ===
- Like an Omen (1975)

=== Short stories ===
- "Harvest Bay" (1995) in Eidolon (Australian magazine), Spring 1995
- "A Momentary Brightness" (1997) in Eidolon, issue 24, Autumn 1997
- "Extracts from a Chronicle" (1997) in Eidolon, Issue 25/26, Spring 1997
