= Singing My Sister Down =

Short story by Margo Lanagan

- Short story by Margo Lanagan
- Country: Australia
- Language: English
- Genre: Fantasy Short story

Publication
- Published in: Black Juice
- Publication type: Short story collection
- Publisher: Allen & Unwin
- Media type: Print (Paperback)
- Publication date: 2004

"Singing My Sister Down" is a 2004 fantasy short story by Australian writer Margo Lanagan.

== Background ==
"Singing My Sister Down" was first published in 2004 in the author's first collection of short stories, Black Juice and published by Allen & Unwin. The story was later published in The Year's Best Fantasy & Horror: Eighteenth Annual Collection edited by Ellen Datlow, Kelly Link, and Gavin J. Grant; The Year's Best Australian Science Fiction and Fantasy (Volume 1) edited by Bill Congreve and Michelle Marquardt; and The Weird: A Compendium of Strange and Dark Stories edited by Jeff VanderMeer and Ann VanderMeer.

== Synopsis ==
A young boy watches as his sister Ikky is publicly executed by slow submersion in a tar pit. It is implied that Ikky killed her husband with an axe, but the crime is never explicitly stated. Weird Fiction Review writes that "Lanagan is a master of "show not tell", which adds to the puzzle of the character's backstories." They also reference that the public execution shows the shaming of the surviving family and that shame is a reoccurring theme in Lanagan's work.

== Awards ==
- 2004 Aurealis Awards – Young Adult Short Story – winner
- 2004 Bram Stoker Award – Superior Achievement in Short Fiction – nominated
- 2004 International Horror Guild Award- Best Short Form – nominated
- 2005 World Fantasy Award – Best Short Fiction – winner
- 2005 Ditmar Award – Best Short Story – winner
- 2005 Theodore Sturgeon Award – nominated
- 2006 Hugo Award – Best Short Story – nominated
- 2006 Nebula Award – Short Story – nominated
