= Eidolon I =

- Eidolon I first edition cover.
- Author: Jonathan Strahan and Jeremy G. Byrne (editors)
- Cover artist: Shaun Tan
- Language: English
- Genre: Speculative fiction
- Publisher: Eidolon Books
- Publication date: 2006
- Publication place: Australia
- Media type: Print (paperback)
- Pages: 295 pp (first edition)
- ISBN: 0-9586864-7-5

Eidolon I is a 2006 speculative fiction anthology edited by Jonathan Strahan and Jeremy G. Byrne.

== Background ==
Eidolon I was first published in 2006 by Eidolon Books in trade paperback format. It was a short-list nominee for the 2007 Ditmar Award for best collected work but lost to The Year's Best Australian Science Fiction & Fantasy Volume Two, edited by Bill Congreve and Michelle Marquardt. It also finished 25th in the 2007 Locus Awards for best anthology. Eidolon I features 17 stories by 17 authors. One of the stories featured in the anthology, Margo Lanagan's "A Fine Magic" won the 2006 Aurealis Award for best fantasy short story and also finished 15th in the 2007 Locus Awards for best short story. Four other stories were also nominated at the Aurealis Awards. Simon Brown's "Leviathan" and "The Dying Light" by Deborah Biancotti were nominated for best young-adult short story, Chris Lawson's "Hieronymous Boche" for best horror short-story, and Lucy Sussex' "The Revenant" for best fantasy short story. Biancotti's story was also a Nominee for Best Short Story in the 2006 Australian Shadows Awards.

== Contents ==
- "A Fine Magic", short fiction by Margo Lanagan
- "Big Green Mama Falls in Love", short fiction by Eleanor Arnason
- "Cassandra's Hands", short fiction by Kim Westwood
- "Gin", short fiction by Holly Phillips
- "Gone to Flowers", short fiction by Elizabeth Bear
- "Hieronymus Boche", short story by Chris Lawson
- "Leviathan", short story by Simon Brown
- "My Report on the Secret Life of Shane Hamill", short fiction by Jeff VanderMeer
- "The Angel of Gamblers", short fiction by Hal Duncan
- "The Bridal Bier", short fiction by Carol Ryles
- "The Conqueror", short fiction by Grace Dugan
- "The Dying Light", short story by Deborah Biancotti
- "The Legend of Greatmother June", short story by Alistair Ong
- "The Revenant", short fiction by Lucy Sussex
- "The Third-Quarter King", short fiction by Tim Pratt
- "Thievery", short fiction by Deborah Roggie
- "Trimalchio's Chamber Pot", short fiction by William R. Eakin (as William Eakin)
