= Harvest Bay =

- Short story by Karen Attard
- Country: Australia
- Language: English
- Genre: Fantasy

Publication
- Published in: Eidolon #19
- Publication type: Periodical
- Publisher: Eidolon Publications
- Media type: Print (Magazine)
- Publication date: October 1995

"Harvest Bay" is a 1995 fantasy short story by Australian writer Karen Attard.

== Background ==
"Harvest Bay" was first published in Australia in October 1995 in the nineteenth edition of the Eidolon (Australian magazine) magazine by Eidolon Publications. It was published alongside five other stories by the authors Garth Madsen, Brett Coulstock, Stephen Dedman, Robert Hood and Sean Williams. "Harvest Bay" won the 1995 Aurealis Award for best fantasy short story.
