= Kerryn Goldsworthy =

Australian writer (born 1953)

- Born: 14 May 1953; South Australia, Australia
- Occupations: Journalist, critic and editor
- Writing career
- Notable awards: 2013 Walkley Award — Geraldine Pascall Prize for Critical Writing — Critic of the Year, winner

Dr. Kerryn Lee Goldsworthy (born 14 May 1953) is an Australian freelance writer and former academic.

== Life and career ==
Goldsworthy has edited four anthologies of Australian writing. She has also written many articles, essays and reviews.

She has a B.A. and Ph.D. from the University of Adelaide. She taught at the University of Melbourne from 1981 to 1997 as a tutor and lecturer and has also worked briefly at Deakin, Flinders and Adelaide Universities, and at the University of Klagenfurt, in Austria. She was the editor of the Australian Book Review (May 1986 to Dec 1987); decades later she claimed that the experience involved her "learning more about human nature in those two years than in either the preceding thirty-three or the following nineteen."

Goldsworthy also served as a member of the Literature Board of the Australia Council and has also been the recipient of Australia Council grants allocated from its Literature Fund.

In 1997, Kerryn Goldsworthy returned to Adelaide and turned to freelance writing. She was a judge of the prestigious Miles Franklin Award for a year, until she resigned, along with two other judges, over a charter that changed the decision-making powers of the judges. She has also served as a visiting research fellow at the University of Adelaide where she is a guest teacher in the Graduate Certificate course in Food Writing. She also writes for a number of weblogs. Goldsworthy's political views are left-wing. She once described herself as "an old fashioned feminist." In 2013 Goldsworthy was awarded the Pascall Prize 'Australian Critic of the Year', Australia's major national award for criticism. Her essay, The Limit of the World, won her the 2017 Horne Prize.

== Bibliography ==
=== Books ===
- Goldsworthy, Kerryn (1989). North of the Moonlight Sonata. McPhee Gribble.
- Australian Short Stories, J.M. Dent & Sons (1983), ISBN 0867700211
- Coast to Coast, HarperCollins Publishers (Australia) Pty Ltd (1 November 1986), ISBN 978-0-207-15300-6
- Australian Love Stories, Oxford University Press (1997), ISBN 978-0-19-550601-3
- Helen Garner (Australian Writers series), Oxford University Press, USA (1 May 1997), ISBN 978-0-19-553281-4
- Australian Women's Stories (edited by Kerryn Goldsworthy), (1999) Oxford University Press, ISBN 978-0-19-551295-3
- Macquarie PEN Anthology of Australian Literature, Allen and Unwin, (2009), co-edited with Nicholas Jose, Anita Heiss, David McCooey, Peter Minter, Nicole Moore, and Elizabeth Webby, ISBN 9781741754407
- Adelaide, University of New South Wales Press, (2011), ISBN 9781742232621

=== Selected book reviews ===
Date	Review article	Work(s) reviewed
2014	Goldsworthy, Kerryn (September 2014). "Liminality". Australian Book Review. 364: 11.	London, Joan. The Golden Age. Vintage Australia.
