= Chris Willrich =

American science fiction and fantasy writer

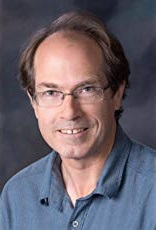
- Born: August 28, 1967 (age 59); Mount Vernon, Washington, United States
- Occupation: Author
- Writing career
- Genres: science fiction and fantasy
- Website: www.chriswillrich.com

Chris Willrich (born August 28, 1967, in Mount Vernon, Washington) is an American science fiction and fantasy writer. He is best known for his stories about Persimmon Gaunt and Imago Bone. His work has appeared in Asimov's Science Fiction, Beneath Ceaseless Skies, Black Gate, The Magazine of Fantasy & Science Fiction, Flashing Swords!, The Mythic Circle, and Strange Horizons.

== Biography ==
Willrich is from Washington State originally, and now lives with his family in Silicon Valley. He majored in English and has worked as a children's librarian.

== Bibliography ==
=== Gaunt and Bone Novels ===
- The Scroll of Years (Pyr - 2013)
- The Silk Map (Pyr - 2014)
- The Chart of Tomorrows (Pyr - 2015)

=== Gaunt and Bone Short Stories ===
- The Thief with Two Deaths (Fantasy and Science Fiction, June 2000)
- King Rainjoy's Tears (2002)
- Penultima Thule (2006)
- A Wizard of the Old School (2007)
- The Sword of Loving Kindness (2008) - appeared as a serialization in Beneath Ceaseless Skies:
  - The Sword of Loving Kindness Pt. I in issue #1,
  - The Sword of Loving Kindness Pt. II in issue #2
- The Mermaid and the Mortal Thing (Lightspeed Magazine - 2012)

=== Pathfinder Tales ===
Willrich wrote a Novel and a short story in the Pathfinder universe.

- The Dagger of Trust - novel 2014
- The Cloak of Belonging - short story, web fiction 2014

=== Poetry ===
- The Vampire Astronomer (2012)

=== Short fiction ===
- Little Death (Asimov's Science Fiction - 1994)
- Count to One (Asimov's Science Fiction - 2003)
- Sails the Morne (Asimov's Science Fiction - 2009)
- The Lions of Karthagar (Black Gate - 2011)
- The Mote-Dancer and the Firelife (Beneath Ceaseless Skies - 2012)
- How the Wicker Knight Would Not Move (Beneath Ceaseless Skies - 2012)
- Grand Tour (Fantasy & Science Fiction - 2012)
- Star Soup (Asimov's Science Fiction - 2012)
- Waiting for a Me Like You (Fantasy & Science Fiction - 2012)
- What Lies in Ice (Tales from the Magician's Skull - 2017)
- Shadowdrop (Beneath Ceaseless Skies - 2018)
- Fragments from the Library of Cygnus X-1 (Asimov's Science Fiction - 2019)
- On Magog's Pond (Beneath Ceaseless Skies - 2022)
