= Things We Didn't See Coming =

2009 short story collection by Australian author Steven Amsterdam

- Author: Steven Amsterdam
- Language: English
- Genre: Short story collection
- Publisher: Sleepers Publishing
- Publication date: 2009
- Publication place: Australia
- Media type: Print
- Pages: 174 pp.
- Awards: 2009 The Age Book of the Year Award – Fiction, winner
- ISBN: 9781740667012

Things We Didn't See Coming is a 2009 short story collection by the Australian author Steven Amsterdam originally published by Sleepers Publishing.

It was the winner of the 2009 The Age Book of the Year Award – Fiction.

The collection comprises nine inter-connected stories which follow one man over a period of three decades.

== Contents ==
- "What We Know Now"
- "The Theft That Got Me Here"
- "Dry Land"
- "Cakewalk"
- "Uses for Vinegar"
- "The Forest for the Trees"
- "Predisposed"
- "The Profit Motive"
- "Best Medicine"

== Critical reception ==
Writing in Australian Book Review Rebecca Starford noted that "Amsterdam takes the well-worn premise of the post-millennial apocalypse and reworks it, creating a dystopia of catastrophic climate change, drug addiction, viral epidemics, alternative relationships and bureaucratic wrangling. It is a familiar world." She concluded that the collection is the "perfect combination of uncanny landscapes, existential anxiety and social critique."

== Publishing history ==
After the collection's initial publication by Sleepers Publishing in Australia in 2009, it was republished as follows:

- Pantheon Books, USA, 2009
- Harvill Secker, UK, 2010
- Hachette Livre, Australia, 2016

It was also translated into Dutch in 2010, and French in 2012.

== Awards ==
- 2009 The Age Book of the Year Award – Fiction, winner
- 2009 The Age Book of the Year Award, winner

== See also ==
- 2009 in Australian literature
