= Chris Lawson (writer) =

Australian writer

- Born: 1966 (age 59–60); Melbourne, Australia
- Occupations: Writer, physician
- Writing career
- Period: 1993–present
- Genre: Speculative fiction
- Website: members.ozemail.com.au/~claw/

Chris Lawson is an Australian writer of speculative fiction.

== Early life and education ==
Lawson was born in Melbourne, Australia in 1966. During his childhood Lawson spent time in Papua New Guinea, where his father worked as a biologist on a crocodile farm and his mother studied psychology of personal identity. Later he studied medicine, attaining a graduate diploma in biostatistics, epidemiology and human genetics.

== Career ==
=== Medicine ===
Lawson worked for the Victorian Aboriginal Health Service and Merck Sharp & Dohme. As of 2011 was practising as a family doctor.

=== Writing ===
Lawson's first work was published in 1993, entitled "Metacarcinoma" his short story was published in the Summer 1993 edition of Eidolon (Australian magazine). He received his first award for his work in 2000 when his short story "Written in Blood" won both the 1999 Aurealis Award for best science fiction short story and the 2000 Ditmar Award for best short fiction.

== Personal life ==
Lawson is married and has two children and as of 2011 was living in Melbourne.

== Awards and nominations ==
Year	Award	Work	Category	Result
1999	Aurealis Award	"Chinese Rooms"	Best science fiction short story	Nomination
1999	Aurealis Award	"Written in Blood"	Best science fiction short story	Won
2000	Ditmar Award	"Written in Blood"	Best short story	Won
2003	Ditmar Award	–	Best fan writer	Nomination
2006	Aurealis Award	"Hieronymous Boche"	Best horror short story	Nomination
2006	Ditmar Award	"Body Parts"	William Atheling Jr. Award	Nomination
2006	Ditmar Award	"Countless Screaming Argonauts"	Best Australian novella or novelette	Nomination
2008	Ditmar Award	Talking Squid	Best fan production	Nomination

== Bibliography ==
=== Short fiction ===
- "Metacarcinoma" (1993) in Eidolon (Australian magazine) Summer 1993 (ed. Jeremy G. Byrne, Jonathan Strahan)
- "The Judas Kiss" (1996) in Eidolon Spring 1996 (ed. Jonathan Strahan, Jeremy G. Byrne, Richard Scriven)
- "Unborn Again" (1998) in Dreaming Down-Under (ed. Jack Dann, Janeen Webb)
- "Written in Blood" (1999) in Asimov's Science Fiction June 1999 (ed. Gardner Dozois)
- "Chinese Rooms" (1999) in Eidolon Spring 1999 (ed. Jonathan Strahan, Jeremy G. Byrne)
- "Matthew 24:36" (2000) in Eidolon Autumn 2000, (ed. Jeremy G. Byrne)
- "Lacey's Fingerprints" (2001) in Agog! Terrific Tales (ed. Cat Sparks)
- "Faster, Higher, Stronger" (2002) in Spectrum SF No. 9 (ed. Paul Fraser)
- "Your Soothsayers Are Better" (2003) in Written in Blood
- "No Man's Land" (2003, with Simon Brown) in Gathering the Bones (ed. Ramsey Campbell, Jack Dann, Dennis Etchison)
- "Countless Screaming Argonauts" (2005) in Realms of Fantasy August 2005 (ed. Shawna McCarthy)
- "The Surfing Cannibals of Norway" (2005) in Mitch?4: Stories by Writers Who Should Have Known Better
- "Empathy" (2006) in Cosmos April–May 2006, (ed. Damien Broderick, Wilson da Silva)
- "Screening Test" (2006) in Agog! Ripping Reads (ed. Cat Sparks)
- "Hieronymus Boche" (2006) in Eidolon I (ed. Jeremy G. Byrne, Jonathan Strahan)
- "Canterbury Hollow" (2011) in The Magazine of Fantasy & Science Fiction January–February 2011 (ed. Gordon Van Gelder)
- "Sundown" (2011) in Welcome to the Greenhouse (ed. Gordon Van Gelder)
- "Apologetoi" (2011) in Dead Red Heart (ed. Russell B. Farr)

=== Collections ===
- Written in Blood (2003)

=== Essays ===
- "The Tithonus Option is Not an Option" (1999)
- "Worldcon 1999 Report" (1999) in Locus No. 466
- Counter-Intuitive: "Life Without Sex" (2000) in Ticonderoga On-line
- "We Done Kill'd the Columbia" (2003) in Written in Blood
- "Evolutionary Pressure on Creationists" (2003) in Written in Blood
- "The Standard Book of Alchymical Elementals" (2003) in Written in Blood
- "Fun Experiments With Your Own Brain" (2003) in Written in Blood
- "Body Parts" (2004) in Borderlands #4
- Counter-Intuitive: "The Shape That Kills" in Ticonderoga On-line
- "Neglected Science in Science Fiction" (2004) in Fables & Reflections No. 6
- "The Triangle of Meaning" (2004) in Borderlands No. 3
- Counter-Intuitive: "Still Evolving After All These Years" (2005) in Ticonderoga On-line
- "Preservation of What Exactly?" (2005) in Borderlands #5
- "Conspiracy Theories are Deadlier Than Conspiracies" in Borderlands #6
