= Pink (Wilkinson novel) =

2009 young adult novel by Lili Wilkinson

- First edition book cover
- Author: Lili Wilkinson
- Publisher: Allen & Unwin
- Publication date: August 1, 2009
- ISBN: 9781741758344

Pink is a 2009 young adult novel by Australian writer Lili Wilkinson. It follows Ava, a teenager who transfers schools in hopes of redefining herself.

It was shortlisted for the 2010 Barbara Jefferis Award, a finalist for the 2012 Lambda Literary Award for Children's and Young Adult Literature, and a 2012 Stonewall Book Award honor book.

== Plot ==
Pink follows Ava, a 17-year-old girl who, at the beginning of the novel, asks her progressive, anti-establishment parents if she can transfer out of her low-performing public school to attend a high-performing, upscale private school "where both academic success and a smooth conformity seem the norm". Her parents reluctantly agree, and Ava starts school, leaving her girlfriend Chloe and old life behind.

Although her parents and best friend have also been proud to go against the grain, Ava is thinking about conforming. Encouraged by her new friend Alexis, who is a member of popular crowd, Ava tries out for the school play, but after an embarrassing audition, she resigns herself to being a stagehand.

As Ava befriends the other stage crew, who are known to be the school's misfits, she distances herself from Chloe, and her new friends distance themselves from her. Amidst all this, she considers kissing a boy, despite having already come out a lesbian.

Throughout the novel, Ava tries to figure out how to piece together the pieces of her old and new identities to figure out who she wants to be moving forward.

== Reception ==
Booklist's Karen Cruze highlighted the book's "snarky wit" and how it "never gets overly heavy despite all the hand-wringing".

In a similar vein, Leanne Hall, writing for Readings Books, called Pink "equally entertaining and thought-provoking" and highlighted how "Wilkinson tackles some big issues – gender, feminism, sexuality and racism – with a light touch".

On behalf of School Library Journal, Jennifer Schultz praised how "Wilkinson authentically captures the social awkwardness of high school life and love". She also referred to Ava as "a sympathetic character", though noted that "Chloe becomes increasingly insufferable".

Kirkus Reviews called the novel "funny and poignant", noting that "the delightfully authentic, bawdy dialogue and cast of intensely likable misfits energetically propel this story forward".

Multiple reviewers mentioned potential issues with conflict resolution, including the fact that "some characters are rather quick to forgive past wrongs" and that "the resolution of [Ava's] struggle is too predictable". Similarly, Publishers Weekly noted that "Ava's worlds collide in a melodramatic conclusion that strains believability".

Despite considering the conclusion "melodramatic" and potentially unbelievable, Publishers Weekly considered Ava's "final realization" to be "cogent and satisfying". They also highlighted "the thoughtful conversations [Ava] has about the complexity of gender and identity", the novel's "strongest parts".

== Awards and honors ==
In 2012, the American Library Association included Pink on their Amelia Bloomer List and Rainbow Book List.

Awards for Pink
Year	Award	Result	Ref.
2010	Barbara Jefferis Award	Shortlist	
2012	Lambda Literary Award for Children's and Young Adult Literature	Finalist	
2012	Stonewall Book Award for Children's and Young Adult Literature	Honor	
