= Anna Spargo-Ryan =

Australian writer

Anna Spargo-Ryan is an Australian author, scriptwriter and editor. She has written two novels and a memoir, in addition to works of fiction and non-fiction published in Australian newspapers and literary magazines. In 2016 she was the inaugural winner of the Horne Prize for her essay The Suicide Gene.

== Early life and education ==
Anna Spargo-Ryan was born in Adelaide, South Australia, and educated at the Pembroke School, before completing her Victorian Certificate of Education at Wesley College in Melbourne.

After leaving school she worked in digital marketing and web design, while raising her two children.

She holds a PhD in creative writing from Deakin University, and has sold essays and articles written during the process to pay for the degree.

== Writing career ==
In 2016, Spargo-Ryan published her first novel, The Paper House, which was longlisted for the 2017 Australian Book Industry Awards' Matt Richell Award for New Writer of the Year. The novel has been described as "a layered articulation of loss and grief, perception and reality".

Spargo-Ryan's essay about Australian rules football, How to Love Football was published in Black, Inc's The Best Australian Essays 2016, after featuring in the publisher's earlier collection From the Outer: Footy Like You've Never Heard It. She also wrote the essay The Suicide Gene about her family history of mental illness, which was awarded the Horne Prize for best essay up to 3,000 words about Australian life.

The following year she published her second novel, The Gulf, written in just three months. The novel is described as "a coming-of-age story dealing with themes of domestic violence, substance abuse, financial hardship; with Spargo-Ryan tempering the harshness with humour and a relatable narrator".

In 2022 Spargo-Ryan published her anticipated memoir A Kind of Magic about her personal experiences with mental illness, and the intricacies of the human brain. It was shortlisted for the Nonfiction Book Award at the 2023 Queensland Literary Awards.

== Bibliography ==
- 2016 – The Paper House (ISBN 978-1743535202)
- 2017 – The Gulf (ISBN 978-1743537176)
- 2022 – A Kind of Magic (ISBN 978-1761150739)

== Personal life ==
Anna Spargo-Ryan lives in Melbourne with her two children. Her mother Kate Spargo is currently serving on the board of the Geelong Football Club. Spargo-Ryan remains an ardent advocate for cake stalls at election voting sites in her spare time.
