= Christopher Green (author) =

Australian writer

- Born: United States
- Writing career
- Period: 2008–present
- Genre: Speculative short fiction
- Notable awards: Aurealis Award; Best fantasy short story 2009 "Father's Kill"
- Website: christophergreen.wordpress.com

Christopher Green is an Australian writer of speculative short fiction.

== Biography ==
Green is a graduate of Clarion South and currently lives in Geelong, Australia. His first story was published in 2008, entitled "Lakeside" which was published in the anthology Dreaming Again, edited by Jack Dann. "Lakeside" was a finalist at the 2008 Australian Shadow Awards. In 2009 Green had three stories on the short-list at the Aurealis Award – "Having Faith" was a finalist in the horror short story division but lost to Paul Haines' "Slice of Life", a "A Hundredth Name" was a finalist in the science fiction short story division but lost to Peter M. Ball's "Clockwork, Patchwork and Ravens", and "Father's Kill" won the fantasy short story award.

Green was also a short-listed for the 2010 Ditmar Award for new talent. In 2011 Green started writing his first novel. Entitled Arizona Afterwards he published the novel online as a free one-chapter-a-week novel. Green also released his first collection, Love and Other Losses, which contained 14 short stories. It was published by Nighttime Logic as an Amazon Kindle e-book.

== Bibliography ==
=== Collections ===
Year	Title	Publisher	Notes
2011	Love and Other Losses	Nighttime Logic	Contains 14 short stories.

=== Novels ===
Year	Title	Publisher	Notes
2011	Arizona Afterwards	–	Published online as a free one-chapter-a-week novel. Contains 53 chapters.

=== Short fiction ===
Year	Title	Original publication	Awards and nominations
2008	"Lakeside"	Dreaming Again (ed. Jack Dann)	Nomination: 2008 Australian Shadows Award
2009	"Having Faith"	Nossa Morte February 2009	Nomination: 2009 Aurealis Award for best horror short story
2009	"A Hundredth Name"	Abyss & Apex No. 31	Nomination: 2009 Aurealis Award for best science fiction short story
2009	"A Crazy Kind of Love"	Nossa Morte	
2009	"Reservations"	Expanded Horizons	
2009	"Father's Kill"	Beneath Ceaseless Skies No. 24	Win: 2009 Aurealis Award for best fantasy short story
2009	"My Rough Cut"	The Edge of Propinquity	
2010	"Darwin's Daughter"	The Tangled Bank (ed. Chris Lynch)	
2010	"Stickman"	Night Chills No. 1	
2010	"Jumbuck"	Aurealis No. 44	
2010	"Where We Go to be Made Lighter"	Midnight Echo No. 4	
2010	"Linger"	Andromeda Spaceways Inflight Magazine No. 46	
2010	"Darkling"	Fifty-Two Stitches	
2010	"Holding Hands"	Fantastique Unfettered	
2011	"Stitched"	Shock Totem No. 3	
2011	"Letters of Love from the Once and Newly Dead"	Midnight Echo No. 5	Win: 2010 AHWA Short Story Competition
