= Steven Amsterdam =

American writer (born 1966)

- Born: January 31, 1966 (age 60); New York City, U.S.
- Education: Bronx High School of Science; University of Chicago; University of Melbourne
- Occupation: Writer
- Writing career
- Notable awards: Horne Prize (2020)
- Website: stevenamsterdam.com

Steven Amsterdam (born in New York City on January 31, 1966) is an American writer. He lives in Melbourne, Australia, where he also works as a palliative care nurse.

== Biography ==
Steven Amsterdam was born and raised in New York City. He attended Bronx High School of Science, the University of Chicago and the University of Melbourne. He worked as a map editor, book jacket designer and pastry chef before moving to Australia in 2003. His writing has appeared in The Age, Condé Nast Traveller, Five Chapters, HuffPost, Meanjin, The Monthly, Monument, Overland, Sleepers Almanac and Torpedo's Greatest Hits.

His first book, Things We Didn't See Coming was published in Australia by Sleepers Publishing in 2009. Alternately described as a novel or linked story collection, the book follows the narrator from Y2K into the future. The book won The Age Book of the Year for 2009 and was shortlisted for the New South Wales Premier's Prize. In 2010, the book was published by Pantheon Books in the United States, where it was a Barnes & Noble Great New Writer selection, and by Harvill Secker in the United Kingdom, where it was longlisted for the Guardian First Book Award. The Guardian called the book "refreshingly unapocalyptic". Starting in 2011, the book was selected for the Victorian Certificate of Education for year 12 English.

What the Family Needed, a novel that follows a family with special powers over decades, was first published by Sleepers Publishing in 2011. The novel drew attention even from international prize committees, and he got shortlisted for The Age Book of the Year and the ALS Gold Medal, as well as longlisted for the Prime Minister's Literary Award and the International Dublin Literary Award.

The Easy Way Out, first published in 2016 by Hachette Australia, is set in an unnamed city where assisted dying is legal. The book, which follows the story of one such assistant, has been called "a perfect storm of a novel" by The Sydney Morning Herald and "incredibly funny" by Australian Book Review. It was shortlisted for the ALS Gold Medal and longlisted for the Miles Franklin Award.

In 2020 Steven won the Horne Prize with his essay "There and Here". The essay tackles the loneliness experienced by expatriates as a result of travel restrictions during the COVID-19 pandemic.

Amsterdam has received a grant from the Australia Council. His books have been translated into Dutch, French, Italian and Hebrew.

== Literary awards ==
Year	Work	Prize	Category	Result	Ref
2009	Things We Didn't See Coming	The Age Book of the Year	Fiction Book of the Year	winner	
2009	Things We Didn't See Coming	ALS Gold Medal	—	longlist	
2010	Things We Didn't See Coming	Guardian First Book Award	—	longlist	
2010	Things We Didn't See Coming	New South Wales Premier's Literary Awards	New Fiction	shortlist	
2012	What the Family Needed	The Age Book of the Year	Fiction Book of the Year	shortlist	
2012	What the Family Needed	Encore Award	—	shortlist	
2012	What the Family Needed	Prime Minister's Literary Awards	Fiction	longlist	
2013	What the Family Needed	International Dublin Literary Award	—	longlist	
2017	The Easy Way Out	ALS Gold Medal	—	shortlist	
2017	The Easy Way Out	Australian Book Industry Awards	Literary Fiction	longlist	
2017	The Easy Way Out	Miles Franklin Award	—	shortlist	
2017	The Easy Way Out	Prime Minister's Literary Awards	Fiction	shortlist	

== Bibliography ==
- —— (2009). Things We Didn't See Coming. Sleepers Publishing.
- —— (2012). What the Family Needed. Sleepers Publishing.
- —— (2016). The Easy Way Out. Hachette Australia.
- —— (2023). The Lives of Writers. HarperCollins Australia.
