= Black Juice =

Collected short stories by Margo Lanagan

- First edition
- Author: Margo Lanagan
- Language: English
- Genre: Horror, fantasy, science fiction
- Publisher: Allen and Unwin
- Publication date: 2004
- Publication place: Australia
- Media type: Print (paperback)
- Pages: 222
- ISBN: 1741145015

Black Juice is the first collection of short stories by Australian writer Margo Lanagan. It was released in paperback by Allen and Unwin in 2004, and features the author's widely anthologised short story "Singing My Sister Down", which won the 2005 World Fantasy Award for Best Short Story.

The collection includes 10 original short stories by the author that fall into the fantasy, science fiction, horror and young adult genres. It won the 2004 Victorian Premier's Prize for Writing for Young Adults, and the 2005 World Fantasy Award for Best Collection.

== Contents ==
- "Singing My Sister Down" – winner of World Fantasy Award, Ditmar Award, and Aurealis Award
- "My Lord's Man"
- "Red Nose Day"
- "Sweet Pippit"
- "House of the Many"
- "Wooden Bride"
- "Earthly Uses"
- "Perpetual Light"
- "Yowlinin"
- "Rite of Spring"

== Awards ==
- 2004 Victorian Premier's Prize for Writing for Young Adults – winner
- 2004 Queensland Premier's Literary Awards — Best Young Adult Book – shortlisted
- 2005 World Fantasy Award for Best Collection – winner
- 2005 Ditmar Award Best Collected Work – winner
- 2005 The Courier-Mail Book of the Year Award – shortlisted
- 2005 New South Wales Premier's Literary Awards — Christina Stead Prize for Fiction – shortlisted
- 2006 Michael L. Printz Award for Excellence in Young Adult Literature – honour book

== Critical reception ==
- Colin Greenland in The Guardian called the stories "remarkable, luminous, mysterious", and concluded that "In Lanagan's hands the implications of words and phrases, the meanings folded into them, balloon out into landscapes as complex and interrelated and hence indeterminate as life itself: life in Indonesia or New South Wales, the past or the future or anywhere."
