= Eidolon Publications =

Small press publisher

- Founded: 1990
- Country of origin: Australia
- Headquarters location: North Perth, Western Australia
- Fiction genres: Speculative fiction
- Official website: eidolon.net

Eidolon Publications was a small press publisher based in North Perth, Western Australia. The company previously published the speculative fiction magazine Eidolon which ran from 1990 to 2000 and published books under the name of Eidolon Books.

== History ==
Eidolon Publications begun in 1990 and started publishing the Eidolon magazine. In 1992 the company expanded into non-magazine publishing, releasing Terry Dowling's "The Mars You Have in Me" as a chapbook. In 1996 Eidolon begun a book-line with Robin Pen's The Secret Life of Rubber-Suit Monsters. They then signed with HarperCollins to edit The Year's best Australian Science Fiction and Fantasy anthology series which began in 1997. In 2000 Eidolon put their magazine on hiatus but continued to accept submissions. In 2002 an editorial committee attempted to restart the magazine but it proved unsuccessful. The company published Terry Dowling's Blackwater Days which won the 2001 Ditmar Award for best collected work and the story within the book "The Saltimbanques" won the best short fiction award.

== Eidolon magazine ==
Eidolon: The Journal of Australian Science Fiction and Fantasy was first released in Autumn 1990 and was released quarterly until 1996. It was reduced to two issues a year until 1998 when it was reduced to one issue a year. The magazine was put on hiatus in 2000. In total it ran for 26 issues finishing on issue #29/30. In 1992, it won the Ditmar Award for best fanzine, and in 1993 it won the Ditmar Award for best periodical. It won the Ditmar Award for best publication/fanzine/periodical in 1996, and in 1998 it won best fanzine award again. The magazine has featured short stories which have been short-listed and won literary awards. Three authors won the Aurealis Award for their story, Karen Attard's "Harvest Bay" won 1995 Aurealis Award for best fantasy short story, Sean Williams' "Passing the Bone" won 1996 Aurealis Award for best horror short story, Damien Broderick's "Infinite Monkey" won the 2000 Aurealis Award for best science fiction short story and Stephen Dedman's "The Devotee" won the 2001 Ditmar Ward for best short fiction and other various authors have been finalists for both the Ditmar Award and the Aurealis Award. Artwork featured on the magazine by Shaun Tan has also won awards; in 1995 he won the Ditmar Award for best professional Artwork and the 1996 Ditmar Award for best Artwork on the cover of the issue #19.

== Eidolon Books ==
Eidolon Books is the book publishing arm of Eidolon Publications. In 2006 they released the anthology Eidolon I. It was nominated for best collected work at the 2007 Ditmar Awards. It also featured six stories that were nominated for various Aurealis Awards, with Margo Lanagan's "A Fine Magic" winning the award for best fantasy short story and other stories also were nominees for other awards.
