= Ian McHugh =

Australian writer

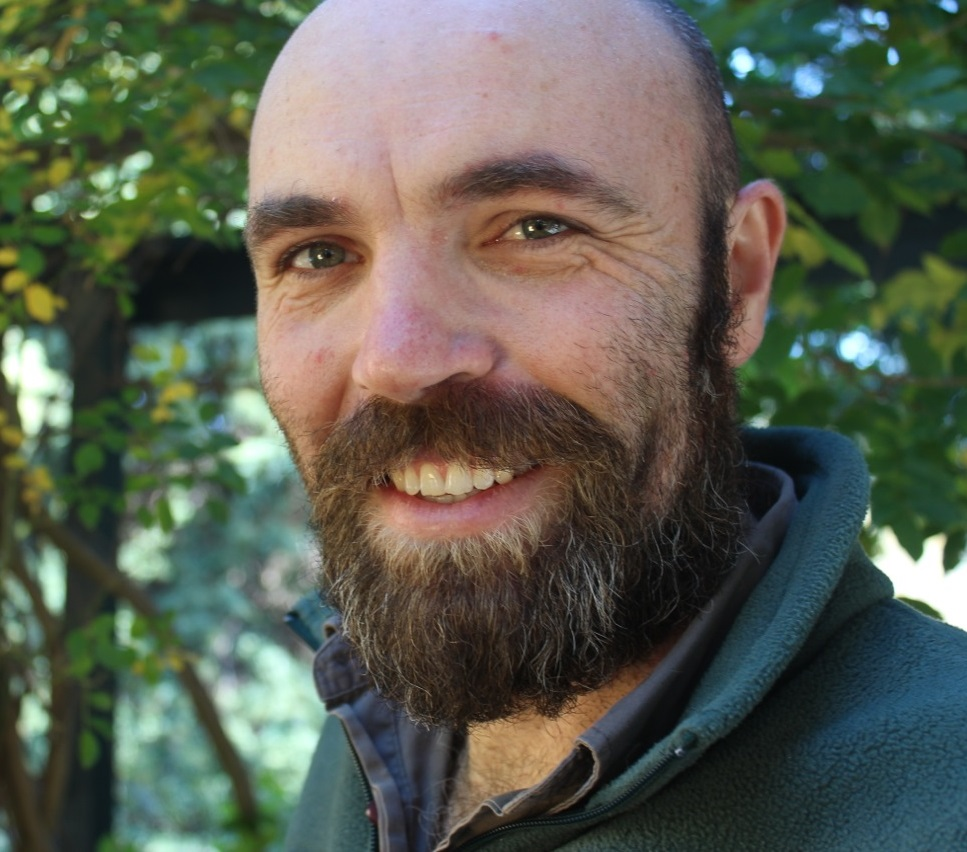
- McHugh in 2013
- Writing career
- Genre: Speculative short fiction
- Notable awards: Aurealis Award; Best fantasy short story 2009 "Once a Month, On a Sunday"; Writers of the Future; Grand prize 2008 "Bitter Dreams"
- Website: ianmchugh.wordpress.com

Ian McHugh is an Australian writer of speculative short fiction.

== Biography ==
McHugh's first story was published in 2004, entitled "The Alchemical Automaton Blues" which was published in Andromeda Spaceways Inflight Magazine #15. His first win came with his story "Bitter Dreams" which won the 2008 Writers of the Future grand prize. It was also a nominee for the writers of the Future 3rd quarter at the same awards and was a short-list nominee for the 2008 Aurealis Award for Best Horror Short Story. In 2009, McHugh's "Once a Month, On a Sunday" was a joint-winner for the 2009 Aurealis Award for best fantasy short story. McHugh currently lives in Canberra, Australia and is a member of the Canberra Speculative Fiction Guild.

== Bibliography ==
Collections

- Angel Dust (2014)

Stories

Title	Year	First published	Reprinted/collected	Notes
Extracted journal notes for an ethnography of Bnebene nomad culture	2014	McHugh, Ian (January 2014). "Extracted journal notes for an ethnography of Bnebene nomad culture". Asimov's Science Fiction. 38 (1): 30–43.		

- McHugh, Ian (2004). "The Alchemical Automaton Blues". Andromeda Spaceways Inflight Magazine. 15.
- "The Last Day of Rea" (2006) in All Star Stories presents: Twenty Epics
- "The Greatest Adventure of All" (2007) in Coyote Wild Vol. 1 No. 4, Autumn 2007
- "Grace" (2007) in Andromeda Spaceways Inflight Magazine #28 (ed. Zara Baxter)
- "The Dao of Stones" (2007) in Challenging Destiny #24
- "Requiem in D-minor (for prions, whale and burning bush)" (2007) in Hub #24
- "The Greatest Adventure of All" (2007) in Coyote Wild, Autumn 2007
- "Bitter Dreams" (2008) in Writers of the Future XXIV (ed. Algis Budrys)
- "Stiletto" (2009) in GUD #4
- "Angel Dust" (2009) in Clockwork Phoenix 2
- "Sleepless in the House of Ye" (2009) in Asimov's Science Fiction July 2009 (ed. Sheila Williams)
- "Once a Month, On a Sunday" (2009) in Andromeda Spaceways Inflight Magazine #40
- "Songdogs" (2009) in Beneath Ceaseless Skies #27
- "The Gifts of Avalae" (2010) in Blood & Devotion
- "Annicca" (2010) in Greatest Uncommon Denominator #6
- "Red Dirt" (2010) in Beneath Ceaseless Skies 58
- "Interloper" (2011) in Asimov's Science Fiction January 2011
- "Boumee and the Apes" (2011) in Analog Science Fiction and Fact May 2011
- "The Wishwriter's Wife" (2011) in Daily Science Fiction July 2011
- "The Navigator and the Sky" (2012) in Giganotosaurus 1 July 2012
- "Linger" (2012) in AntipodeanSF September 2012
- "From Sorrow's Gate" (2013) in Crowded Issue 1
- "Vandiemensland" (2013) in Next
- "Grey Snow in the Shadows" (2013) in Andromeda Spaceways Inflight Magazine #58
- "Cold, Cold War" (2013) in Beneath Ceaseless Skies 123
- "The Canal Barge Magician's Number Nine Daughter" (2013) in Clockwork Phoenix 4
- "When the Rain Comes" (2013) in Asimov's Science Fiction October-November 2013
- "Extracted Journal Notes for an Ethnography of Bnebene Nomad Culture" (2014) in Asimov's Science Fiction January 2014
- "Almost Angels" (2014) in Angel Dust
- "Apricot Finds a Treasure" (2014) in Angel Dust
- "The Beetle Road" (2014) in Angel Dust
- "The Tax Collector of Rhuin" (2014) in Angel Dust
- "When the Rain Comin" (2014) in Angel Dust
- "Demons Enough" (2015) in Beneath Ceaseless Skies 185
- "Tolerance" (2016) in In Your Face
- "The Baby Eaters" (2016) in Asimov's Science Fiction January 2016
- "Seraph" (2017) Heroic Fantasy Quarterly May 2017
- "Triceratops (2017) in Asimov's Science Fiction May-June 2017
- "Monsters Exist" (2017) in Pseudopod 546
- "The Wanderers" (2017) in Giganotosaurus August 2017
- "Story with Two Names" (2019) in Asimov's Science Fiction July-August 2019

== Awards and nominations ==
Aurealis Awards

- Best fantasy short story
- 2009: Win: "Once a Month, On a Sunday"
- Best horror short story
- 2008: Nomination: "Bitter Dreams"
- Best young-adult short story
- 2009: Win: "Once a Month, On a Sunday"

Writers of the Future

- Writers of the Future grand prize
- 2008: Win: "Bitter Dreams"
- Writers of the Future 3rd quarter
- 2008: Nominee: "Bitter Dreams"
