= Tender Morsels =

Book by Margo Lanagan

- First edition
- Author: Margo Lanagan
- Language: English
- Genre: novel
- Publisher: Allen & Unwin, Australia
- Publication date: 2008
- Publication place: Australia
- Media type: Print (Paperback)
- Pages: 362
- ISBN: 9781741147964
- Followed by: Sea Hearts

Tender Morsels (2008) is a novel by Australian author Margo Lanagan. It won the Ditmar Award in 2009 for Best Novel and was joint winner of the 2009 World Fantasy Award for Best Novel.

== Plot summary ==
Based on the Brothers Grimm story of "Snow-White and Rose-Red", this novel tells the story of 15-year-old motherless Liga, who has been repeatedly raped by her father. When she is pregnant with her third child – the first two having been forcibly miscarried – she attempts to take her own life but is instead transported to a magical place; a haven from the real world where she and her two daughters, gentle Branza and wild Urdda, are safe from threat. But the membrane separating her new world from her old begins to rupture, bringing reality and old wounds to light, and healing.

== Notes ==
- Dedication: For my sisters, Susi, Jude and Amanda.

== Reviews ==
- Meg Rosoff in The Guardian found that "Tender Morsels, by the Australian author Margo Lanagan, is funny, tragic, wise, tender and beautifully written. It also left me gasping with shock."
- Van Ikin in The Sydney Morning Herald argues that the novel is "a towering work of imagination in which a supremely talented writer opens rich new frontiers."

== Awards and nominations ==
- 2008 shortlisted Shirley Jackson Award — Novel
- 2008 shortlisted Aurealis Awards for Excellence in Australian Speculative Fiction — Fantasy Division — Best Novel
- 2009 winner Ditmar Award - Best Novel
- 2009 joint winner World Fantasy Award - Best Novel
- 2009 honour book Michael L. Printz Award for Excellence in Young Adult Literature
- 2009 finalist Locus Award for Best Young Adult Novel – 5th place
