= Freya Marske =

Australian author of fantasy novels and podcaster

- Writing career
- Genre: Fantasy
- Website: freyamarske.com

Freya Marske is an Australian fantasy and romance author and podcaster.

Marske's novels, which she has defined as romantasy, also spotlight queer romance. Her fantasy trilogy, The Last Binding, is set in a fantastic version of the Edwardian Era. The trilogy was nominated for a Hugo Award in 2024 in the "Best Series" category.

She co-hosted the Hugo-nominated podcast Be the Serpent for four years.

== Awards and recognition ==
- 2020 Ditmar Award for Best New Talent
- 2025 Aurealis Award for Best Fantasy Novella

== Personal life ==
Marske is a medical doctor. She has one child. She is a member of the LGBTQ community.

== Works ==
=== Standalone novels ===
- Swordcrossed (2024)
- Cinder House (2025)
- Bodies of Magic (2026)

=== The Last Binding trilogy ===
- A Marvellous Light (2021)
- A Restless Truth (2022)
- A Power Unbound (2023)
