= Beneath Ceaseless Skies =

Fantasy magazine

- Cover art for The Best of Beneath Ceaseless Skies Online Magazine, Year One. The work is called "Endless Skies" and was created by Rick Sardinha.
- Editor-in-Chief: Scott H. Andrews
- Categories: Fantasy adventure
- Frequency: Fortnightly
- First issue: October 9, 2008
- Company: Firkin Press
- Country: United States
- Based in: Reston, Virginia
- Language: English
- Website: http://www.beneath-ceaseless-skies.com/

Beneath Ceaseless Skies (BCS) is an online magazine published in the United States by Firkin Press. One of the preeminent journals devoted to fantasy short fiction, the magazine publishes character-centered secondary-world fantasies and has won the British Fantasy and World Fantasy Awards along with being a finalist for multiple Hugo Awards.

== History ==
Founded by Scott H. Andrews in 2008, the first issue of Beneath Ceaseless Skies featured stories by Chris Willrich and David D. Levine. From its start, the magazine focused on fantasy stories set in a secondary world. While the magazine still focuses on secondary-world fantasies, in 2012 Beneath Ceaseless Skies published its first science-fantasy special edition, focusing on science fiction stories set on secondary worlds. The magazine has continued to publish these special science-fantasy-month issues every two years.

In the magazine's first year it was runner-up for the 2008 Million Writers Award for the Best New Online Magazine, losing to Cha: An Asian Literary Journal. In 2010 Beneath Ceaseless Skies became a SFWA qualifying venue for short fiction, with the designation retroactive to the first issue. Later that year they also released their first e-book anthology, entitled The Best of Beneath Ceaseless Skies Online Magazine, Year One, which contained 14 stories which had been previously published in the magazine. Firkin Press continued to release annual Beneath Ceaseless Skies "best of" anthologies through 2018.

Selected stories from the magazine are also published as audio fiction podcasts.

Beneath Ceaseless Skies was a finalist for the Hugo Award for Best Semiprozine each year from 2013 to 2022, after which editor-in-chief Scott H. Andrews recused the magazine from further nominations in this category so other magazines could have a chance at making the award's final ballot.

In 2024, the magazine published its 400th issue. The following year, Beneath Ceaseless Skies noted the magazine averaged 95,000 uniques per month while the magazine's podcast episodes averaged 8,300 downloads.

== Contributing writers ==
R. B. Lemberg has published numerous stories set in their Birdverse in Beneath Ceaseless Skies. Other authors published in the magazine include Saladin Ahmed, Aliette de Bodard, Marie Brennan, Maurice Broaddus, Thomas Ha, Alix E. Harrow, Jordan Kurella, Yoon Ha Lee, Aimee Ogden, Cat Rambo, Bonnie Jo Stufflebeam, Natalia Theodoridou, Genevieve Valentine, and many others.

== Critical reception ==
Jeremy Brett, curator of the Science Fiction & Fantasy Research Collection at Texas A&M University, has called Beneath Ceaseless Skies "One of the preeminent online journals devoted to fantasy short fiction." He added that the magazine "is notable for its beautiful 'cover art,' as well as its frequent reprinting of wonderful stories from its archives" and that the journal is key "for readers looking to understand the evolution of modern fantasy and the many ways that the genre expresses itself today."

Writing in the The Encyclopedia of Science Fiction, Mike Ashley said that by focusing on secondary world fantasies, Beneath Ceaseless Skies "cultivates the fields that represent the hinterland of science fiction and which can often help define the distinctions between sf and fantasy." Lois Tilton praised the magazine in Locus for reviving "adventure fantasy, secondary-world fantasy, as a respectable subgenre of short fiction, raising it from the midden of disdain into which it had been cast by most of the rest of the field." In a different review, Tilton added that the magazine had become the "premier venue for fantastic fiction, not just online but for all media."

== Firkin Press ==
Beneath Ceaseless Skies is published by Firkin Press, a non-profit organisation aimed at promoting science-fiction and fantasy short literature.

== Awards and honors ==
- 2019 winner of the World Fantasy Award for Scott H. Andrews for Special Award, Non-Professional for Beneath Ceaseless Skies. Andrews has also been nominated 9 other times for the award for his work on Beneath Ceaseless Skies.
- 2016 winner of the British Fantasy Award for Best Magazine/Periodical.
- The magazine was a ten-time finalist for the Hugo Award for Best Semiprozine, from 2013 to 2022. In 2022, Andrews recused the magazine from future consideration in this category so other magazines could be finalists.
- Scott H. Andrews is a four-time finalist for the Hugo Award for Best Professional Editor (Short Form) for his work editing Beneath Ceaseless Skies.
- Finalist for the Ignyte Award for Outstanding Fiction Podcast in 2020, 2023, and 2026.
- "Father's Kill" by Christopher Green in issue #24 won the 2009 Aurealis Award for Best Fantasy Short Story.
- "The Telling" by Gregory Norman Bossert in issue #109 won the 2013 World Fantasy Award for Best Short Story.
- "Carnival Nine" by Caroline M. Yoachim from issue #225 was a finalist in the short story category for the 2018 Hugo, World Fantasy and Nebula Awards.
- "Do Not Look Back, My Lion" by Alix E. Harrow from issue #270 was a finalist for the 2020 Hugo Award for Best Short Story.
- "The Mermaid Astronaut" by Yoon Ha Lee from issue #298 was a finalist for the 2021 Hugo Award for Best Short Story.
- "A Witch's Transition In The City Of Ghosts" by Oluwatomiwa Ajeigbe from issue #380 won the 2024 Ignyte Award for Outstanding Short Story.
- "Another Tide" by Will Greatwich from issue #420 won the 2024 Aurealis Award for Best Fantasy Novella.
- "Blood and Desert Dreams" by Y.M. Pang from issue #408 won the 2025 Aurora Award for Best Short Fiction.

In addition, stories from Beneath Ceaseless Skies have been finalist for a number of other awards including the Nebula Awards for Best Short Story and Best Novelette, the Aurealis Award, the Aurora Award, the WSFA Small Press Award, the Eugie Award, and the Locus Award.
