= Lili Wilkinson =

Australian writer

- Wilkinson in 2026
- Born: 7 April 1981 (age 45); Melbourne, Australia
- Occupation: Author
- Writing career
- Genre: Young adult
- Website: liliwilkinson.com.au

Lili Wilkinson (born 7 April 1981) is an Australian author. She has written for several publications, including The Age, and managed insideadog.com.au, a website for teenagers about books, as part of her role at the Centre For Youth Literature at the State Library Victoria until January 2011.

== Early life and education ==
Wilkinson was born in Melbourne, the daughter of children's author Carole Wilkinson and film and television sound recordist John Wilkinson. She attended Spensley Street Primary School and Mac.Robertson Girls' High School. Heavily involved in drama, in Year 7 she played Aphrodite in a musical version of the Odyssey.

Wilkinson has spoken of her love for the work of Diana Wynne Jones, David Almond and Lewis Carroll in interviews. Shaun Tan is her favourite illustrator. She has been quoted as saying: "My favourite books would be Fire and Hemlock by Diana Wynne Jones and Through the Looking-Glass and What Alice Found There by Lewis Carroll. Oh, and Love That Dog by Sharon Creech. And The Last Samurai by Helen DeWitt."

In 2015, Wilkinson completed a PhD in writing. Her thesis examined the influence of young adult fiction on the politicisation of teenagers.

== Works ==
=== Novels ===
- Joan of Arc: The Story of Jehanne Darc (2006)
- Scatterheart (2007)
- The Not-Quite Perfect Boyfriend (2008)
- Pink (2009)
- Angel Fish (2009)
- Pocketful of eyes (2011)
- Love-shy (2012)
- The Zigzag Effect (2013)
- Green Valentine (2015)
- The Boundless Sublime (2016)
- After the Lights Go Out (2018)
- The Erasure Initiative (2020)
- A Hunger of Thorns (2023)
- Deep is the Fen (2024)
- Unhallowed Halls (2025)
- Lavender & Hemlock (2026)

==== Hodgepodge series ====
- Hodgepodge: How to Make a Pet Monster 1 (2020)
- Flummox: How to Make a Pet Monster 2 (2021)
- Smidgen: How to Make a Pet Monster 3 (2022)

==== Bravepaw series ====
- Bravepaw and the Heartstone of Alluria (2024)
- Bravepaw and the Clawstone of Rotwood Mire (2025)
- Bravepaw and the Fangstone of Flintfall (2026)

=== Picture books ===
- That Christmas Feeling (2017)
- Clancy the Quokka (2020)

=== Edited anthologies ===
- Short (2008)

=== Book chapters ===
- "Fantastic Worlds" & "In Defense of Pink Books" in Right Book Right Time (ed. Agnes Nieuwenhuizen) (2007)

== Awards and recognition ==
- 2020 Aurealis Award for Best Children's Fiction, shortlisted for Hodgepodge: How to Make a Pet Monster
- 2020 Aurealis Award for Best Young Adult Novel, winner for The Erasure Initiative
- 2021 Griffith University Young Adult Book Award, shortlisted for The Erasure Initiative
- 2024 Victorian Premier's Prize for Writing for Young Adults, winner for A Hunger of Thorns
- 2024 Prime Minister's Literary Award for Young Adult Fiction, shortlisted for A Hunger of Thorns
- 2026 Children's Book of the Year Award for Older Readers, shortlisted for Unhallowed Halls
