= Margo Lanagan =

Australian writer

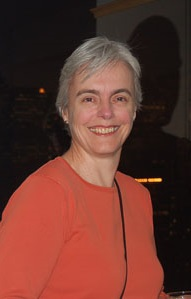
- Lanagan in 2007
- Born: 1960 (age 65–66); Waratah, New South Wales, Australia
- Occupations: Writer; Short story author; Novelist
- Writing career
- Genres: Young adult fiction; Fantasy; Children's literature; Short stories; Horror
- Notable works: Black Juice; Tender Morsels; Sea Hearts; White Time
- Notable awards: World Fantasy Award; Printz Honor Award; Shirley Jackson Award finalist

Margo Lanagan (born 1960 in Waratah, New South Wales) is an Australian writer of short stories and young adult fiction.

== Biography ==
She grew up in Raymond Terrace and moved to Melbourne circa 1971/1972. After overseas travel, she moved to Sydney in 1982.

Many of her books, including Young Adult (YA) fiction, were only published in Australia, but several have attracted worldwide attention. Her short story collection Black Juice won two World Fantasy Awards and a 2006 Printz Honor Award. It was published in Australia by Allen & Unwin, in the United Kingdom by Gollancz in 2004, and in North America by HarperCollins in 2005. It includes the much-anthologized short story "Singing My Sister Down", which was nominated for both the Hugo and the Nebula Awards for the best short story.

Her short story collection White Time (ISBN 0-06-074393-X), originally published in Australia by Allen & Unwin in 2000, was published in North America by HarperCollins in August 2006, after the success of Black Juice. It received recognition as a 2007 Best Book for Young Adults from the American Library Association.

In addition to Black Juice, a 2006 recipient, Tender Morsels also won a Printz Honor Award in 2009.

Tender Morsels was a 2008 Shirley Jackson Award finalist, and the novella Sea-Hearts (later expanded into a novel) was a 2009 finalist. Tender Morsels won a World Fantasy Award in 2009 for best novel, and was a Locus Award for Best Young Adult Book nominee. Sea-Hearts won the World Fantasy Award for Best Novella in 2010.

Lanagan is an alumna of the Clarion West Writers Workshop, 1999, and returned as a teacher in 2011 and 2013.

== Bibliography ==
=== Novels ===
==== Teenage romances ====
As Melanie Carter:

- —— (1991). The Cappuccino Kid. Random House Australia. ISBN 9781863590181.

As Belinda Hayes:

- —— (1991). Star of the Show. Random House Australia. ISBN 9781863590198.
- —— (1991). The Girl in the Mirror. Bantam. ISBN 9781863590204.

As Gilly Lockwood:

- —— (1992). Nowhere Girl. Pan Macmillan. ISBN 9780330332477.
- —— (1993). Misty Blues. Pan Macmillan. ISBN 9780330274098.
- —— (1993). On the Wildside. Pan Macmillan. ISBN 9780330274401.

As Mandy McBride:

- —— (1990). Temper, Temper. Bantam. ISBN 9780947189952.
- —— (1992). New Girl. Australia: Random House. ISBN 9781863189965.
- —— (1992). Cover Girl. Australia: Random House. ISBN 9781863590488.

==== Junior fiction ====
- —— (1991). WildGame. Sydney: Allen & Unwin.
- ——. The Tankermen. Sydney: Allen & Unwin.
- ——. Walking Through Albert. Sydney: Allen & Unwin.
- —— (2004). Treasure-Hunters of Quentaris. Lothian Books.
- —— (2007). The Singing Stones: A Tale of the Shimmaron. ABC Books.

==== Young adult fiction ====
- —— (1995). The Best Thing. Sydney: Allen & Unwin. ISBN 9781864488241.
- —— (1996). Touching Earth Lightly. Sydney: Allen & Unwin. ISBN 9781864488234.

==== Fantasy fiction ====
- —— (2008). Tender Morsels.
- —— (2012). Sea Hearts.

=== Short story collections ===
- —— (2006). White Time (hardcover 1st ed.). New York: Eos. ISBN 9780060743932.
- —— (2004). Black Juice (paperback 1st ed.). Crows Nest: Allen & Unwin. ISBN 9781741750911.
- —— (2006). Red Spikes (paperback 1st ed.). Allen & Unwin. ISBN 9781741146578.
- —— (2011). Yellowcake (paperback 1st ed.). Allen & Unwin. ISBN 9781742374789.
- —— (2012). Cracklescape (paperback 1st ed.). Twelfth Planet Press. ISBN 9780987216243.

=== Short fiction ===
- "A Fine Magic" (2006) in Eidolon I (ed. Jeremy G. Byrne, Jonathan Strahan)
- "Winkie" (2006) in Red Spikes
- "Machine Maid" (2008) in "Extraordinary Engines" (ed. Nick Gevers)
- "A Dark Red Love Knot" (2009) in How Beautiful the Ordinary: Twelve Stories of Identity (ed. Michael Chart)
- "Ferryman" (2009) in Firebirds Soaring (ed. Sharyn November)
- "Mulberry Boys" (2011) in Blood and Other Cravings (ed. Ellen Datlow)
- "Blooding the Bride" (May 2012) in Exotic Gothic 4 (ed. Danel Olson)
- "The Fifth Star in the Southern Cross" (2013) in After the End: Recent Apocalypses (ed. Paula Guran)
- "Mouth to Mouth" (2014) in Novascapes (ed. C.E. Page)
