= Andromeda Spaceways Inflight Magazine =

Science fiction magazine

- Categories: Science fiction magazine
- Frequency: Quarterly
- First issue: June 2002
- Company: Andromeda Spaceways Publishing Co-Op
- Country: Australia
- Based in: Canberra, ACT
- Website: www.andromedaspaceways.com
- ISSN: 1446-781X

Andromeda Spaceways Inflight Magazine or ASIM is a fantasy and science fiction magazine published out of Canberra, ACT, Australia. The publishers of ASIM describe it as "Australia's Pulpiest SF Magazine". The magazine is currently edited by Andromeda Spaceways Publishing Incorporated and is published quarterly. Although originally sold only in Australia, subscriptions for ASIM are now available worldwide through Amazon.com and other online vendors.

== History ==
The first issue of Andromeda Spaceways Inflight Magazine was released in June 2002 as a slightly larger than digest size print magazine. Although the publishers of ASIM continued to offer it as a print magazine, in April 2006 they began releasing an electronic PDF version of the magazine beginning with issue #22. In June 2007 ASIM released a series of "best of" anthologies in the PDF format. There are a total of three anthologies in the series; one for science fiction, one for fantasy and one for horror.

As of issue #54 ePub and mobi eBook versions also became available. As of Issue #64, in September 2016, the magazine name was simplified to Andromeda Spaceways Magazine, the magazine banner was modernised, and all issues became electronic only, with an occasional collected 'Best of' print edition.

As of September 2024, Andromeda Spaceways Magazine has published a total of 96 issues.

== Awards and recognition ==
The launch of Andromeda Spaceways Inflight Magazine won a Ditmar Award in 2003 as the "Best Australian Production", and two stories published in the magazine tied for the Sir Julius Vogel Award in 2004 as "Best Short Story". In addition the magazine and works published in it have been nominated for twelve Ditmar and five Aurealis Award. In 2008 ASIM won a special Sir Julius Vogel Award for services to New Zealand science fiction.

== Notable authors ==
Notable authors published in the magazine include:

- Lee Battersby
- Simon Brown
- David Conyers
- Shane Jiraiya Cummings
- Stephen Dedman
- Jennifer Fallon
- Paul Haines
- Simon Haynes
- Tom Holt
- Rick Kennett
- Ken Liu
- Martin Livings
- Stephen Marley
- Sean McMullen
- Nike Sulway
- Liz Williams
- Sean Williams

== Reviews ==
- Many issues of ASIM have been reviewed at Tangent Short Fiction Review.
