= John Jude Palencar bibliography =

This is a partial list of books for which American artist and illustrator John Jude Palencar was the cover artist or illustrated the cover and interior pages.

== Bibliography ==
=== Illustrated books ===
Books illustrated by the artist, both cover art and interior

- The Secret, by Byron Preiss, Bantam Books, 1982
- Stories of five decades / Hermann Hesse, edited by Theodore Ziolkowski, Franklin Library, 1984
- Restless Dead : More Strange Real-Life Mysteries by Jim Razzi, HarperTrophy, 1994
- Nightmare Island: and Other Real-Life Mysteries by Jim Razzi, Harper Collins, 1993

=== As cover artist ===
Books for which the artist created the cover art

- Star Rider by Doris Piserchia (1983)
- The Ghost Light by Fritz Leiber (1984)
- Teot's War by Heather Gladney (1986)
- The Postman by David Brin (1986)
- Lord of the Crooked Paths by David H. Adkins (1987)
- Chthon by Piers Anthony (1987)
- The Serpent's Egg by Caroline Stevermer(1988)
- Master of the Fearful Depths by David H. Adkins(1989)
- Blood Storm by Heather Gladney (1989)
- Blake House by Adrian Savage (1990)
- The Devil's Advocate by Andrew Neiderman (1990)
- Scorpio by Alex McDonough (1990)
- Scorpio Rising by Alex McDonough (1990)
- Tehanu by Ursula K. Le Guin(1991)
- Scorpio Descending by Alex McDonough (1991)
- Blood Price by Tanya Huff (1991)
- Blood Trail by Tanya Huff (1991)
- The Hollow Man by Dan Simmons (1992)
- Apparition by Graham Masterton (1992)
- Impossible Things (1993)
- Blood Pact by Tanya Huff (1993)
- Blood Lines by Tanya Huff (1993)
- The Wall at the Edge of the World, by Jim Aikin (1993)
- The Innkeeper's Song by Peter S. Beagle (1993)
- The Forest House by Marion Zimmer Bradley (1994)
- Impossible Things by Connie Willis (1994)
- The Children of Men by P.D. James (1994)
- Rhinegold by Stephan Grundy (1994)
- Dead Morn by Piers Anthony, Roberto Fuentes (1994)
- The Hollowing by Robert Holdstock (1994)
- Mind of My Mind by Octavia E. Butler (1994)
- LoveDeath by Dan Simmons (1994)
- Personal Darkness by Tanith Lee (1994)
- Earthsong by Suzette Haden Elgin (1994)
- Evolution's Shore by Ian McDonald (1995)
- Parable of the Sower by Octavia E. Butler (1995)
- Patternmaster by Octavia E. Butler (1995)
- Dreams of Terror and Death: The Dream Cycle of H.P. Lovecraft (1995)
- Testament by Valerie J. Freireich (1995)
- Sisters of the Night anthology by Martin H. Greenberg and Barbara Hambly (1995)
- Becoming Human by Valerie J. Freireich (1995)
- All the Bells on Earth by James P. Blaylock (1995)
- The Transition of H. P. Lovecraft: The Road to Madness by H.P. Lovecraft(1996)
- Return to Avalon by Jennifer Roberson (1996)
- Attila's Treasure by Stephan Grundy (1996)
- Archangel by Sharon Shinn (1996)
- Clay's Ark by Octavia E. Butler (1996)
- Lady of Avalon (1997)
- Jovah's Angel by Sharon Shinn (1997)
- Blood Debt by Tanya Huff (1997)
- Adulthood Rites by Octavia E. Butler (1997)
- Dawn by Octavia E. Butler (1997)
- Imago by Octavia E. Butler (1997)
- The Regulators by Richard Bachman (1997)
- The White Tribunal by Paula Volsky (1997)
- Desperation by Stephen King (1997)
- The Dark Tower paperback editions by Stephen King (1997)
  - The Drawing of the Three
  - The Waste Lands
  - Wizard and Glass
- The Alleluia Files by Sharon Shinn (1998)
- Tales of the Cthulhu Mythos anthology by August Derleth (1998)
- Fire Watch by Connie Willis (1998)
- Of Saints and Shadows by Christopher Golden (1998)
- The Arm of the Stone by Victoria Strauss (1998)
- Graven Images: Three Stories, by Paul Fleischman (1999)
- The Terrorists of Irustan by Louise Marley (1999)
- The Wild Swans by Peg Kerr (1999)
- Wild Seed by Octavia E. Butler (1999)
- Forests of the Heart by Charles de Lint (2000)
- Daughter of the Forest by Juliet Marillier (2000)
- Liar Liar by R.L. Stine (2000)
- Locker 13 by R.L. Stine (2000)
- The Redemption of Althalus by David Eddings and Leigh Eddings (2000)
- The Onion Girl by Charles de Lint (2001)
- The Bone Doll's Twin by Lynn Flewelling (2001)
- Kushiel's Dart by Jacqueline Carey (2001)
- Empty Cities of the Full Moon by Howard V. Hendrix (2001)
- Child of the Prophecy by Juliet Marillier (2001)
- Son of the Shadows by Juliet Marillier (2001)
- Shadows over Innsmouth anthology by Stephen Jones
- Parable of the Talents by Octavia E. Butler (2001)
- Kushiel's Chosen by Jacqueline Carey (2002)
- A Scattering of Jades by Alexander C. Irvine (2002)
- The Eye of Night by Pauline J. Alama
- Waifs and Strays by Charles de Lint (2002)
- Tales of the Lovecraft Mythos anthology by Robert M. Price (2002)
- Kushiel's Avatar by Jacqueline Carey (2003)
- Angelica by Sharon Shinn (2003)
- Hidden Warrior by Lynn Flewelling (2003)
- Dreams Underfoot by Charles de Lint
- Eragon by Christopher Paolini (2003)
- Spirits in the Wires by Charles de Lint (2003)
- Confidence Game by Michelle M. Welch
- Shadows Over Baker Street anthology by John Pelan and Michael Reaves (2003)
- Eye of Flame by Pamela Sargent (2003)
- Angel-Seeker by Sharon Shinn (2004)
- Smoke and Shadows by Tanya Huff (2004)
- The New Lovecraft Circle anthology by Robert M. Price (2004)
- The Child Goddess by Louise Marley (2004)
- The Wild Reel by Paul Brandon (2004)
- The Bright and The Dark by Michelle M. Welch (2004)
- This Immortal by Roger Zelazny (2004)
- Trader by Charles de Lint (2005)
- Smoke and Mirrors by Tanya Huff (2005)
- A Princess of Roumania by Paul Park (2005)
- Someplace to Be Flying by Charles de Lint (2005)
- Eldest by Christopher Paolini (2005)
- Chasing Fire by Michelle M. Welch (2005)
- Four and Twenty Blackbirds by Cherie Priest (2005)
- The Lord of the Rings (2005)
  - The Fellowship of the Ring (2005)
  - The Two Towers (2005)
  - The Return of the King
- Moonlight and Vines by Charles de Lint (2006)
- Widdershins by Charles de Lint (2006)
- Kushiel's Scion by Jacqueline Carey (2006)
- Smoke and Ashes by Tanya Huff (2006)
- The Greener Shore by Morgan Llywelyn (2006)
- The Oracle's Queen by Lynn Flewelling (2006)
- The Blood Books, Volume 1 by Tanya Huff (2006)
- The Blood Books, Volume 2 by Tanya Huff (2006)
- The Black Tattoo by Sam Enthoven (2006)
- Darth Bane: Path of Destruction by Drew Karpyshyn (2006)
- The Tourmaline by Paul Park (2006)
- Wings To The Kingdom by Cherie Priest (2006)
- Brisingr by Christopher Paolini (2006)
- The White Tyger by Paul Park (2007)
- Wizards: Magical Tales from the Masters of Modern Fantasy anthology by Jack Dann and Gardner Dozois (2007)
- Territory by Emma Bull (2007)
- The Winds of Marble Arch and Other Stories by Connie Willis (2007)
- The Horror in the Museum by H. P. Lovecraft (2007)
- Not Flesh Nor Feathers by Cherie Priest (2007)
- Fatal Revenant by Stephen R. Donaldson (2007)
- Feast of Souls by C. S. Friedman (2008)
- The Hidden World by Paul Park (2008)
- The Watchers Out of Time by August Derleth and H. P. Lovecraft (2008)
- Heir to Sevenwaters by Juliet Marillier (2009)
- Steal Across the Sky by Nancy Kress (2009)
- Wings of Wrath by C. S. Friedman (2009)
- The Mystery of Grace by Charles de Lint (2009)
- The Dragon Book anthology by Jack Dann and Gardner Dozois (2009)
- Darth Bane: Dynasty of Evil by Drew Karpyshyn (2009)
- Black Ships by Jo Graham (2009)
- Muse and Reverie by Charles de Lint (2009)
- Hand of Isis by Jo Graham (2010)
- Bitter Seeds by Ian Tregillis (2010)
- Stealing Fire by Jo Graham (2010)
- Against All Things Ending by Stephen R. Donaldson (2010)
- Seer of Sevenwaters by Juliet Marillier (2010)
- The Horrid Glory of Its Wings by Elizabeth Bear (2010)
- Lee at the Alamo by Harry Turtledove (2011)
- Inheritance by Christopher Paolini (2011)
- Broken Blade by Kelly McCullough (2011)
- Our Human by Adam-Troy Castro (2012)
- Bared Blade by Kelly McCullough (2012)
- Legacy of Kings by C. S. Friedman (2012)
- Flame of Sevenwaters by Juliet Marillier (2012)
- Crossed Blades by Kelly McCullough (2012)
- Daughter of Regals & Other Tales by Stephen R. Donaldson (2012)
- Rag and Bone, by Priya Sharma, Tor Books (2013)
- Blade Reforged by Kelly McCullough (2013)
- A Terror by Jeffrey Ford (2013)
- Blades in Shadow by Kelly McCullough (2013)
- The Last Dark by Stephen R. Donaldson (2013)
- Weird Shadows Over Innsmouth anthology by Stephen Jones (2013)
- Incarnations of Immortality by Piers Anthony (2013)
- The One-Eyed Man by L. E. Modesitt Jr. (2013)
- Reave the Just and Other Tales by Stephen R. Donaldson (2014)
- Drawn Blades by Kelly McCullough (2014)
- Weirder Shadows Over Innsmouth, anthology by Stephen Jones (2015)
- The Thyme Fiend by Jeffrey Ford (2015)
- Darkened Blade by Kelly McCullough (2015)
- The Runes of Earth by Stephen R. Donaldson (2015)
- Silver on the Road by Laura Anne Gilman (2015)
- The King's Justice: Two Novellas by Stephen R. Donaldson (2015)
- The Log Goblin by Brian Staveley (2015)
- That Game We Played During the War by Carrie Vaughn (2016)
- The Cold Eye by Laura Anne Gilman (2017)
- Winter Tide by Ruthanna Emrys (2017)
- Deep Roots by Ruthanna Emrys (2018)
- The Fork, the Witch, and the Worm by Christopher Paolini (2018)
- Severed Wings by Steven-Elliot Altman (2020)
- "Murtagh" by Christopher Paolini (2023)
- Nettle & Bone by T. Kingfisher (2023)
- The Sworn Soldier by T. Kingfisher (2025)
