= Líadan =

Líadan is a feminine given name in the Irish language. One possible meaning is gray.

Líadan or Liadan may refer to:

== People ==
- Líadan (poet), seventh-century Irish poet
- St. Líadan, Irish abbess and mother of Ciarán of Saigir
- Líadan (folk group), an all-female Irish folk group

== Fictional characters ==
- Liadan, character in The Sevenwaters Trilogy
- Liadan, character in Son of the Shadows
- Liadan, character in Child of the Prophecy

== See also ==
- Liaden universe
