= Vacomagi =

Ancient British people of Northern Scotland

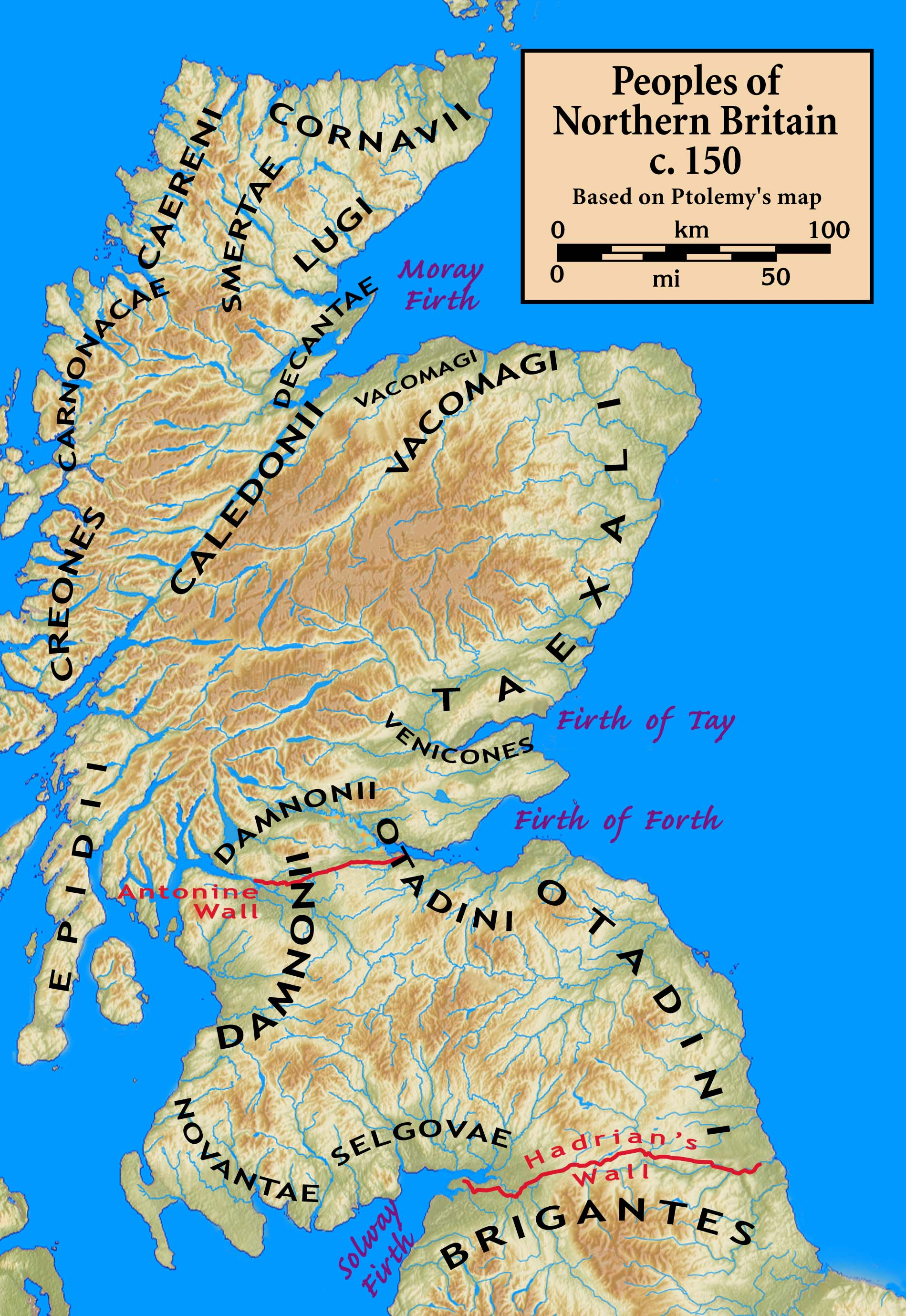
Peoples of Northern Britain according to Ptolemy's map.

The Vacomagi were a people of ancient Scotland, known from a single mention of them by the geographer Claudius Ptolemy. (Note: Other classical sources did not mention the Vacomagi by name, but used a generic term, for example Britons or Caledonians. See Contents > Name > Terminology) Their principal places are known from Ptolemy's map c.150 of Albion island of Britannia – from the First Map of Europe.

The Vacomagi were a confederacy of smaller tribes, each one a separate polity with its own hierarchy of leaders. According to the data collected by Ptolemy, (Note: There has been much speculation about the locations of the places mentioned.) the Vacomagi were spread over a wide area between the Moray Firth and the Firth of Forth; to the east of the Cairngorms and north of the isthmus between the Firth of Clyde and Firth of Forth. (Note: See Contents > Principal places)

== Name ==
=== Terminology ===
..."Warriors from Northern Briton
fought naked and used narrow shields,
a spear and a sword...

— Herodian (c.170–c.240).

The term Vacomagi was used by the Romans to distinguish between those Caledonians whose territory was in the lower plains to the east of the Grampian Mountains, from the Caledonii whose territory was in the Highland glens further west. Ptolemy's map is the only classical source to mention the Vacomagi by name; other classical sources generally used a generic term, for example Britons or Caledonians. (Note: The Roman historian Tacitus used the term Britons in his account of the Battle of Mons Graupius. See Contents > History > Mons Graupius AD c.83.)

Terminology — from 2nd century AD to 4th century AD: (Note: Sally M. Foster – Picts, Gaels and Scots: Map (a) 2nd century AD; Caledones east of the Great Glen; Vacomagi east of the Caledones.; Map (b) 3rd – 4th century AD; Caledones occupy a larger area east of the Great Glen.)

Modern name	Ptolemy	Other sources (Note: See Ancient Rome > Language > ..."The native language of the Romans was Latin...")	Geographic area
Caledonians	?	Caledonians (Note: Noble and Evans – The Picts......"The term Caledones – or the earlier Caledonii – does not occur frequently in the ancient era but the related adjective Caledonia, 'Caledonian', ...is common in classical sources...in relation to the inhabitants living north of the Firth of Forth...); Britannis ..."Britons"; Picti ..."Picts" (Note: The term Picti was first recorded in AD c.297.)	North of the Clyde–Forth isthmus.
Caledones	Caledonii	Caledones	Highland glens to the east of Loch Ness and the Great Glen Fault.
Vacomagi	Vacomagi	Caledones (Note: See Contents > History > 3rd century.)	Lower plains to the east of the Grampian Mountains.

=== Etymology ===
The name is sometimes seen as a derisory insult to the enemy of the Roman army:

1. Latin <vaco> ..."lazy, idle".
2. Latin <magi> ...plural of magus.
  1. Latin <magus> ..."sorcerer, trickster, conjurer".

Other etymologies were proposed, including Isaac (2005) etymology *wako-mago, 'Those inhabiting curved fields', Macbain (1909) referred to the "vaco" element as "obscure", mentioning its possible cognate with Welsh "gwag" (empty), possibly of Latin origin.

The Picts are reported to have believed in the magi – people with supernatural powers; for example the magus Broichan, who was alleged to have the ability to influence the weather. (Note: Noble and Evans – The Picts... Chapter 4 – From pagan magi to early mediaeval saints..."Columba battles with King Bridei's magus Broichan, who claims to be able to control the weather...the pagan magi are of course depicted in a less than glowing light...malicious, taunting, controlled by the "art of the devils" ...) (Note: See Broichan > ...Broichan used his magic to summon the weather against Columba)

== Ptolemy's map ==
=== Principal places ===
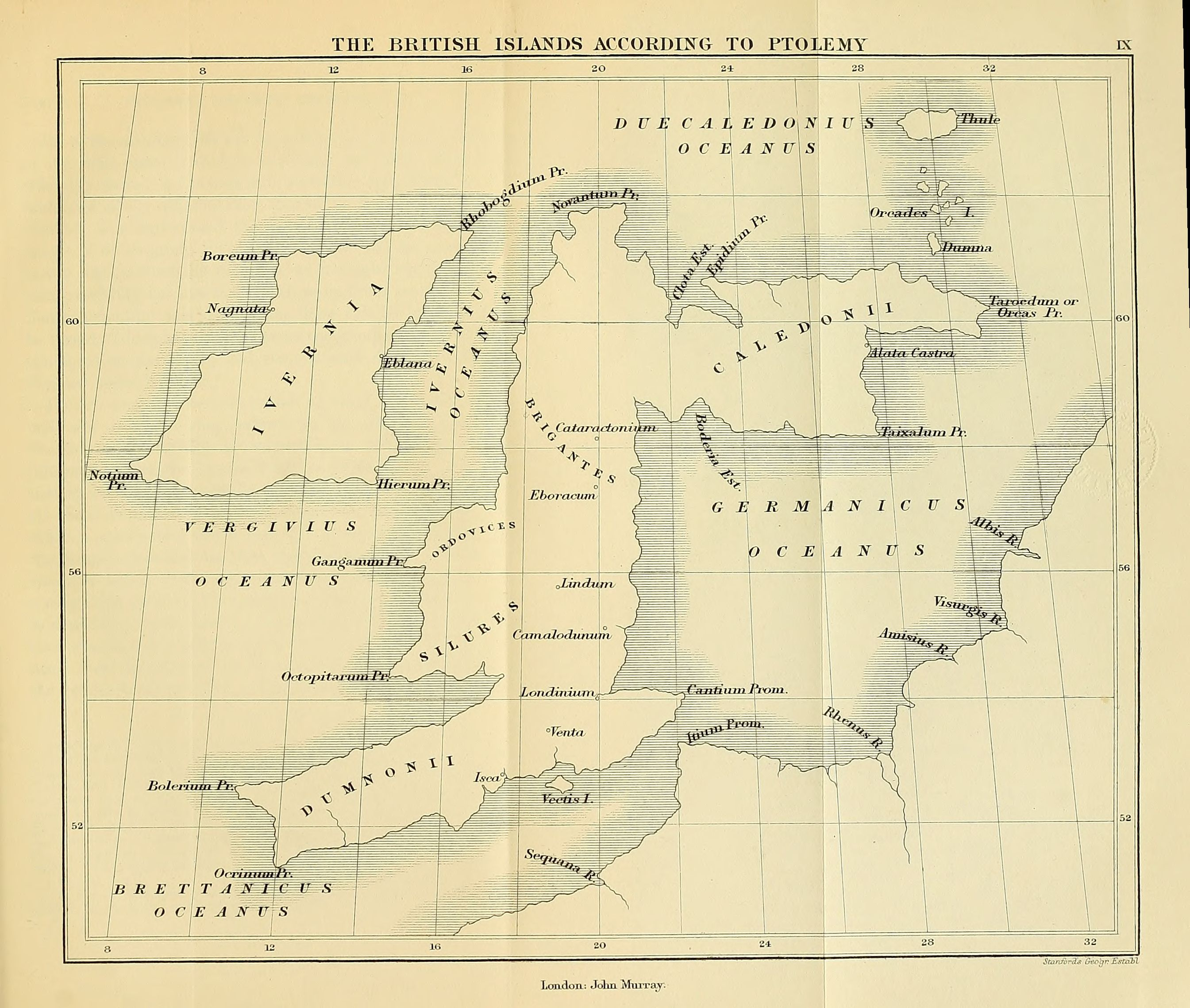
Ptolemy's map of the British Isles.

..."below Caledonia are the Vacomagi, among whom are the following settlements: (Note: Translated from the ancient Greek language.)
— Claudius Ptolemy (AD c.100–c.170)

1. Pinnata Castra
2. Tuesis
3. Tamia
4. Bannatia

The principal places of the Vacomagi are known only from Ptolemy's map of Albion island of Britannia – the First Map of Europe.

The historian Graham Robb has used scaling factors to compensate for the anomaly whereby Scotland appears to tip wildly into the North Sea, in order to determine the possible locations: Robb has calculated that Tamia and Bannatia were further south than previously thought, probably on the Tay and Forth respectively. It might be expected that those settlements were near maritime navigation routes, since most of Ptolemy's data originated from seafarer's travel records.

Place name	Latitude N – S	Longitude E – W	Navigation	Possible location
Pinnata Castra	27°15	59°20	Moray Firth	? Burghead Fort (Note: Graham Robb – The Debatable Land – Appendix Fig. 12: Ptolemy's map of Caledonia.) (Note: Sally M. Foster – Picts, Gaels and Scots..."Forts and coastal promontories...What may be one of the earliest power bases in Pictland is also the largest...the coastal promontory fort at Burghead, Moray...important naval base for the Picts from as far back as the late Roman period...it may even be Ptolemy's Pinnata Castra...)
Tuesis	26°45	59°10	Moray Firth	? Burnfield camp – River Deveron. ? Mouth of the River Spey. (Note: TVESIS AEST. – Spey Bay, Moray Firth.) (Note: Alan G. James – The Brittonic Language... < *tew >..."Ptolemy’s Toúesis [eíschusis]...is not the Tweed, perhaps the Spey...)
Tamia	25°00	59°20	Firth of Tay	? Perth – River Tay ? Bertha Roman fort – River Almond. (Note: Tim Clarkson – Perth and Bertha..."Roman fort at the mouth of the Almond...The original Roman name was probably Tamia, derived from a native name for the River Tay ...)
Bannatia	24°00	59°30	Firth of Forth	? Camelon Roman fort – River Carron. ? Bannock Burn – Forth confluence.

=== Tuesis ===
It has in the past been conjectured that Tuesis was the Romano-British name for the River Spey, however historian Graham Robb has calculated that Tuesis was further east, possibly the Burnfield camp on the River Deveron.

==== Etymology ====
The name element esis (or isis) may derive from eíschusis (*eis-sis), translated from Ptolemy’s ancient Greek text.

The name Tuesis (or Toúesis) was also discussed as being a conflation of the Gaulish deities Toutatis and Esus: (Note: Guy de la Bédoyère – Roman Britain..."conflation of deities was founded as much on complimentary qualities as on those that were similar...) (Note: Neil Oliver – Ancient Britain..."Twinning of gods and goddesses was a tactic the Romans employed all across the Empire...) (Note: See also (Contents) > Archaeology > Jupiter—Tanarus.)

1. Toú – Toutatis – God of the tribe. (Note: The local tribes were: 1. Vacomagi; 2. Taexali – to the east.; 3. Caledonii – to the west.)
2. esis – Esus – God of the river.

Toutatis and Esus were famously associated with the deity Taranis in the poem Pharsalia by the Roman poet Lucan. (Note: Miranda Aldhouse-Green – Dictionary of Celtic Myth and Legend <Esus>..."The Roman poet Lucan described in a poem, the Pharsalia ...the journey of Caesar's troops through southern Gaul and their encounter with three Gaulish gods: Taranis, Toutatis and Esus...(Pharsalia I, 444-6)...Lucan describes this triad as cruel, savage and demanding of human sacrifice......"horrid Esus with his wild altars") (Note: The triad of Gaulish deities mentioned in the poem Pharsalia: 1. Taranis (Tanarus) – God of thunder.; 2. Toutatis – God of the tribe.; 3. Esus – God of the river.)

==== Hadrian's Wall ====
The cult of Esus was possibly introduced into North Britain by the movement of legions and auxiliaries from Roman Gaul (France) and Hispania Tarraconensis (Spain). (Note: See also: Vacomagi: History; Legio XX Valeria Victrix) A bronze bowl (known as the Amiens Skillet) found at Amiens, France, has the inscription:

MAIS ABALLAVA VXELODVNVM CAMBOG...S BANNA ESICA

The inscription is a list of the Roman fort's on Hadrian's Wall. The last fort on the list is Æsica (Great Chesters); the name derives from Esus (or Æsus). (Note: Alan G. James – The Brittonic Language... < *Ẹ:s >..."Latinised as Esus, Æsus, Hesus....the fort-name Æsica or Esica...on Hadrian’s Wall at Great Chesters ...is pretty certainly formed from the Latinised name + the Celtic adjectival suffix –icā-...) A pottery mould that is believed to depict the Gaulish deity Taranis was found at the Coria Roman fort near Hexham. (Note: Guy de la Bédoyère – Roman Britain..."A pottery mould from Corbridge depicts a Celtic warrior god, usually identified as Taranis, with a wheel motif, a standard symbol of the sun...) Similar moulds were used to create relief decoration for fine pottery.

=== Tamia ===
The historian Graham Robb has calculated that Tamia was possibly near the city of Perth. It has been conjectured that the Bertha Roman fort near the River Almond – Tay confluence was originally called Tamia, derived from a native name for the River Tay.

The name element Tam is a common river name, as there are many examples in England; a famous example is the River Thame, (Note: The Th– spelling is a post-conquest Anglo-Norman influence.) one of the major tributaries of the Thames. (Note: P. H. Reaney – English Place Names..."The earliest forms of Thames, Tamesa, Tamesis ...adopted by the Anglo-Saxons as Tamis, Temes..."The common ME Tamise is a French form, as is the modern spelling with the French Th– for T– (Thamis 1220) ...) It has been conjectured that the name element Tam may derive from a Sanskrit word meaning "dark water". (Note: P H Reaney – English Place Names..."The name is considered to be related to the Sanskrit Tamasa ("dark water"), the name of a tributary of the River Ganges ...) Another possibility was suggested that Tam is the nickname of a Celtic god, goddess or deity, it is known that the Celts worshipped rivers, and gave votive offerings. (Note: P H Reaney – English Place Names..."That the Celts worshipped rivers is suggested by the name of the French Marne, Gaulish Matrona 'mother'. The Matronae were the Gaulish mother-goddesses ...) (Note: P H Reaney – English Place Names..."Dee, earlier Deva, is from Brittonic dēvā 'the goddess', 'the holy one', an interpretation confirmed by the Welsh name Aerfen 'the goddess of war'...) (Note: Noble and Evans – The Picts......"Indeed, Gildas, writing in the first half of the 6th century, stated that, in the past, people in Britain..."heaped divine honours on mountains, hills and rivers...")

==== Inchtuthil and Carpow ====
Inchtuthil and Carpow were both Roman legionary fortresses based on the River Tay. They were the only legionary fortresses north of Hadrian's Wall, and therefore of strategic importance. Inchtuthil was only occupied for a short time, and Carpow was occupied much later, from the late second century AD until the early third century AD. It is not known if there was a base at Carpow when data was collected for Ptolemy's map.

==== River Tay ====
The Legio XX Valeria Victrix built and occupied the legionary fortress at Inchtuthil on the River Tay 82–86 AD. A Roman altar found in Chester may provide evidence that the Legio XX worshipped the Gaulish deity Taranis, but using the variant name Tanarus. The Romano-British name for the Tay – Taus – may derive from Tanarus (Ta---us) – god of thunder. (Note: Alistair Moffat – A Journey to Lindisfarne......The derivation of the Tay is thought to be Taus ...) (Note: TAVS AEST.)

=== Bannatia ===
Graham Robb has calculated that Bannatia might have been Camelon Roman fort at Falkirk, south of the River Carron. The name Bannatia may derive from Welsh bannau ("peaks"). This might relate to the views of the Munro peaks, to the north of Stirling, for example Stùc a' Chroin and Ben Vorlich. The etymology suggests that Bannatia was between the Firth of Forth and the Firth of Tay, (Note: This area was later inhabited by the Maeatae tribe.) (Note: Noble and Evans – The Picts......"the inhabitants of the Maiatai territory...continued to speak ...Brittonic – a P-Celtic language, from which modern Welsh...descended..."The use of Brittonic as far north as the Ochils was perhaps due to...connections with southern neighbours...) and validates Graham Robb's methodology for re-evaluating Ptolemy's co-ordinates.

The area around Stirling was historically known as Manau (or Manaw Gododdin). (Note: Keith Coleman – Áedán of the Gaels......"The area around Stirling comprised some of the land in the territory known as Manau) This area has always been strategically important because of its location just north of the Clyde–Forth isthmus. (Note: Keith Coleman – Áedán of the Gaels......"The area of Manau and its surroundings was an area of immense strategic value, fought over repeatedly in the Early Medieval period by Britons, Scots, Irish and Picts...)

== History ==
=== Mons Graupius ===
The Battle of Mons Graupius took place in 83 or 84 AD between the Roman army and a coalition of Vacomagi, Caledonii and other native tribes. (Note: Alistair Moffat – Scotland, A History......"It seems that the kindreds of Scotland beyond the Forth had come together to form a confederacy...) The combined might of the Roman army resulted in a decisive victory for the Roman general Agricola. (Note: See also Gnaeus Julius Agricola > The invasion of Caledonia > ..."In the summer of 83, Agricola...")

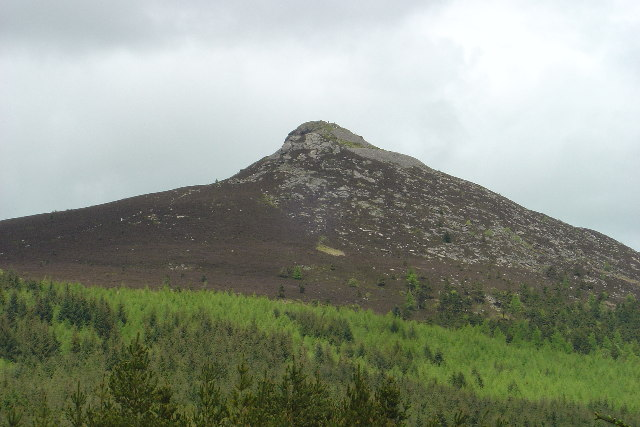
The Mither Tap of Bennachie is possibly Mons Graupius.

The location of the battle ("Graupius mountain") has never been convincingly identified, however most historians agree that it was somewhere east of the Highlands and north of the Forth (in other words – Vacomagi territory – or thereabouts). Some historians believe that Bennachie, near Inverurie in Aberdeenshire, might have been a possible location. (Note: Alistair Moffat – Scotland, A History......"The most persuasive location...Bennachie near Inverurie in Aberdeenshire...)

==== The Roman army ====
The Roman army consisted of: (Note: Guy de la Bédoyère – Roman Britain..."At the Battle of Mons Graupius in AD 83 or 84, Agricola had all, or most, of the IX and XX legions with him. Tacitus says that he also had 8,000 auxiliary infantry and 3,000 auxiliary cavalry...we have...11,000 legionaries...11,000 auxiliaries...The auxiliary cavalry were decisive...it was never necessary to order the legionaries to take part...)

Roman legion	Infantry	Cavalry	Total
IX Hispana; XX Valeria Victrix	?	?	11,000
Auxiliaries	8,000	3,000	11,000
			22,000

==== The Caledonians ====
During the previous years the Roman advance had destroyed farms and crops; (Note: Alistair Moffat – Scotland, A History......"destruction to farmland and harvest caused by the Roman advance...) this had probably been worse for the Vacomagi, whose territory was in the lower plains to the east – than for the Caledonii, whose territory in the Highland glens was more protected. (Note: Alistair Moffat – Scotland, A History......"Unless they were surprised, sensible farmers and their families will have fled into the hills and high ground where their beasts were summering...)

Tribe	Territory	Total
Vacomagi	East of the Highlands; North of the Forth	?
Caledonii	Highland glens	?
Other tribes	Coastal regions	?
		30,000 (Note: The Roman historian Tacitus (AD c.56–c.120) possibly exaggerated his estimate in order to emphasise the success of the Roman army:..."Already more than 30,000 armed men could be observed – Tacitus)

..."More than 30,000 armed men were now to be seen,
and still there were pressing in all the youth of the country,
with all whose old age was yet hale and vigorous,
men renowned in war and bearing each decorations of his own.
— Tacitus (AD c.56–c.120) (Note: Tacitus, Agricola 29)

Translated from the original Latin:
triginta milia ...30,000
armatorum ..."armed men"
aspiciebantur..."to be seen"

==== Tacitus ====
The Roman historian Tacitus gave this account: (Note: Tacitus, Agricola 29)

..."Having sent on a fleet, which by its ravages at various points might cause a vague and wide-spread alarm, he advanced with a lightly equipped force, (Note: Alistair Moffat – Scotland, A History......"Probably in the summer of AD 83, a year after the attack on the IX Legion...Agricola led his army north...hoping to force the Caledonians into a pitched battle....) including in its ranks some Britons of remarkable bravery, whose fidelity had been tried through years of peace, as far as Mons Graupius, (Note: Mons Graupius (Latin: montem Graupium).) which the enemy had already occupied.
..."For the Britons, indeed, in no way cowed by the result of the late engagement, had made up their minds to be either avenged or enslaved, and convinced at length that a common danger must be averted by union, had, by embassies and treaties, summoned forth the whole strength of all their states.
..."More than 30,000 armed men...
..."Meanwhile, among the many leaders, one superior to the rest in valour and in birth, Calgacus by name, is said to have thus harangued the multitude gathered around him and clamouring for battle...
— Tacitus (AD c.56–c.120)

==== Legio XX Valeria Victrix ====
The Legio XX Valeria Victrix from Clunia in Hispania Tarraconensis (Spain) took part in the Battle of Mons Graupius AD c.83 and built and occupied the castra at Inchtuthil on the River Tay AD 82–86. They evacuated Inchtuthill c.87 and arrived at Deva Victrix (Chester) AD 88 where they were based for another two centuries.

Chronology: (Note: See also Legio XX Valeria Victrix > History > ..."In AD 78–84...")

Date	Event
AD 78–84	Legio XX took part in Agricola's campaigns in northern Britannia.
AD 82–83	Legio XX built the base at Inchtuthill.
AD c.83	Legio XX took part in the Battle of Mons Graupius.
AD 84–86	Legio XX occupied the base at Inchtuthill.
AD 86-87	Legio XX evacuated Inchtuthill.
AD 88	Legio XX occupied Deva Victrix (Chester) for another two centuries.
AD 154	Altar dedicated to Jupiter—Tanarus.
AD 1653	Altar found in Chester.
AD 1675	Altar given to Oxford University.
AD 2024	Altar is part of the Arundel marbles collection.

==== Glen Tanar ====
A Roman altar found in Chester, AD 1653, may provide evidence that the Legio XX worshipped the Gaulish deity Taranis, but using the variant name Tanarus. There is a natural association between Tanarus – God of thunder – rain and rivers. (Note: There is a river called Tanaro in north-west Italy, historically part of Gaul.)

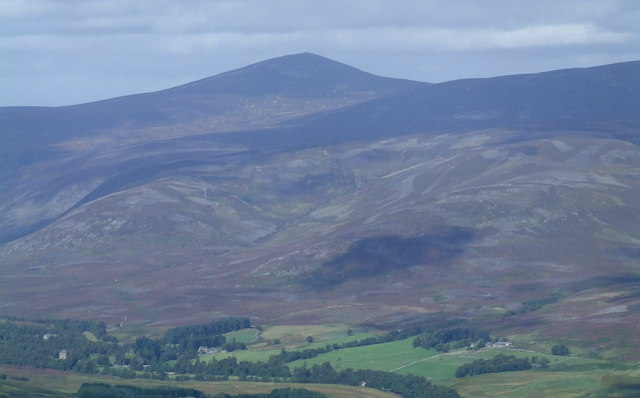
Mount Keen – from Glen Esk. (Scottish Gaelic: Monadh Caoin)

It is possible that the Water of Tanar – in Glen Tanar – derives its name from the Gaulish deity Tanarus. At the entrance to Glen Tanar is the Bridge o' Ess, suggesting that this part of the river was previously known as the Ess (or Esk, a common river name) possibly derived from the Gaulish deity Esus – God of the river. The Tanar rises on the north side of Mount Keen, the most easterly of the Scottish Munro's.

Mount Keen is in a geographic area known as the Mounth, an expanse of high plateau that extends west to east from the Cairngorms across to the North Sea coast. It forms a physical barrier to north-south travel – historians sometimes refer to the Mounth in the context of it being a geo-political border that historically separated the north and south of Pictland. (Note: Sally M. Foster – Picts, Gaels and Scots Glossary – Mounth ..."The traditional boundary between the northern and southern Picts...) (Note: Alistair Moffat – Scotland, A History......"As the 8th century opened...Bridei was succeeded by his brother Nechtan who reigned between 706 and 724 and probably established himself as Rex Pictorum, High King of all the kindreds north and south of the Mounth...)

Mount Keen is also part of a range of hills that defined the west to east boundary between the former regions of Grampian and Tayside.

The Mounth Road is a high level track that connects Glen Esk (south of the Mounth) with Aboyne on the River Dee (north of the Mounth). The track traverses the west flank of Mount Keen before descending down into Glen Tanar. Historically the Mounth Road connected the north and south of Pictland.

=== 2nd century ===
The Vacomagi were a confederacy of smaller tribes, each one a separate polity with its own hierarchy of leaders. According to the data collected by Ptolemy, the Vacomagi were spread out over a wide area between the Moray Firth and the Firth of Forth; to the east of the Cairngorms and north of the Clyde–Forth isthmus. This area was also occupied by neighbouring tribes: Taexali (north-east), Venicones (south-east) and Caledones (west).

=== 3rd century ===
By the late 2nd century – early 3rd century, only two tribes are known (from classical sources) to have occupied the original territory of the Vacomagi: Caledones and Maeatae. It has been conjectured that the Vacomagi and other tribes realigned their allegiances towards two main polities, those of the Caledones and Maeatae, in order to better coordinate their defence against the Romans. (Note: Noble and Evans – The Picts......"As elsewhere on Roman frontiers, one result of the Roman presence may have been the amalgamation of polities bordering Roman Britain, into fewer but larger units. While describing the major Roman campaigns ...north of Hadrian's Wall from AD 208–211 ...Cassius Dio ...noted that:..."the names of other British groups had been merged into these two main polities...)

=== 7th century ===
It was only by about the late 7th century that the descendants of the Vacomagi and Caledones became the contiguous group that is knows as the Picts, ruled by a single Pictish king. (Note: Sally M. Foster – Picts, Gaels and Scots..."If we follow James Fraser (2009), the political birth of the picts as a single people ruled by a single king does not take place until the late 7th century...)

== See also ==
- Insular Celts
- Celtic Britons
- Gaels
- List of ancient Celtic peoples and tribes
- List of ancient Celtic peoples and tribes § Picts / Caledonians
