= Saga of the Light Isles =

Historical fantasy duology by Juliet Marillier

- Wolfskin (2002); Foxmask (2004)
- Author: Juliet Marillier
- Country: United States
- Language: English
- Genre: Fantasy
- Publisher: Pan Macmillan, Tor Books
- Published: 2002-2004
- No. of books: 2

The Saga of the Light Isles is a historical fantasy duology by New Zealand writer Juliet Marillier, consisting of Wolfskin (2002) and Foxmask (2004).

== Wolfskin (2002) ==
Wolfskin was first published by Pan Macmillan in 2002, then by Tor Books in the United States in July 2003.

In the novel, a young Viking warrior, Eyvind, joins a voyage of discovery. In the Light Isles (Orkney) he encounters a Pictish priestess, Nessa, and experiences a clash of cultures and faiths. When his blood brother, Somerled, shows his true colours, Eyvind’s integrity is tested to the limit.

Wolfskin received reviews from Booklist, Kirkus Reviews, and Publishers Weekly.

== Foxmask (2004) ==
Foxmask was first published by Pan MacMillan, then by Tor Books in the United States on August 1, 2004.

Though the novel is a sequel to Wolfskin, it can be read alone. In the novel, Thorvald sets out on a perilous quest to find the father he has never known. With his devoted friend Creidhe and fisherman Sam, he becomes embroiled in a mysterious conflict that will change him forever.

Foxmask received a starred review from Booklist, with additional reviews from Kirkus Reviews and Publishers Weekly.
