= Wolfskin =

2002 fantasy novel by Juliet Marillier

- First edition cover
- Author: Juliet Marillier
- Cover artist: Kinuko Y. Craft
- Language: English
- Series: Saga of the Light Isles
- Genre: Fantasy novel
- Publisher: Pan Macmillan
- Publication date: 2002
- Publication place: Australia
- Media type: Print (Hardback & Paperback)
- Pages: 560
- ISBN: 0-7329-1130-3
- OCLC: 156021800
- Preceded by: -
- Followed by: Foxmask

Wolfskin is the first book of the Saga of the Light Isles series by New Zealand author Juliet Marillier.

== Plot summary ==
Eyvind is a young Viking man who wishes to be a Wolfskin (a berserker warrior of Thor) like his brother. Somerled, a quiet boy of the same age, befriends Eyvind and binds him to loyalty with a blood oath.

After becoming a Wolfskin, Eyvind voyages to the Isles of Light with Somerled, his brother Eirek, Somerled's brother Ulf (the leader of the expedition), and many others. The Vikings quickly establish a peace treaty with the native island folk, and build a settlement.

Then Ulf is murdered sadistically, suspended by ropes from a cliff's edge to die of exposure, leaving his position to Somerled - who immediately breaks the treaty. He sends out the Wolfskins to destroy the small army mustered by the natives in retaliation. Eyvind, seeing that the army is composed of the very young and the very old, suffers a breakdown brought on by the moral crisis.

The native princess and priestess, Nessa, finds him and cares for him, healing his wounds and coldness of spirit. Alone in a hidden cave, with only an old priestess for company, the two young people fall in love.

But Eyvind is soon faced with another crisis: he must face Somerled with newfound proof that the current ruler killed his own brother.

In the Viking hall, Eyvind's accusations are smothered with violence, and he is imprisoned, despite the efforts of his few remaining friends to help him.

Finally, Nessa creates and brings to the hall a harp made out of Ulf's bones, with Ulf's voice (magically restored) as the final voice of truth that cannot be ignored.

Somerled is banished from the Isles, bound by an oath to Eyvind to live as long as possible, and Eyvind stays in the Isles.

== Characters ==
- Eyvind - A young Wolfskin warrior who later falls in love with Nessa.
- Eirek - Eyvind's brother.
- Nessa - The Princess of the Isles of Light and a Priestess-in-training. She later falls in love with Eyvind.
- Somerled - A young man who is Eyvind's bond-brother. He is exiled from the Isles of Light at the end of the book.
- Ulf - Somerled's brother, killed by Somerled during the book.
- King Engus - King of the Isles of Light, killed by the Norsemen.
- Rona - Priestess of the Isles of Light, teaches Nessa.
