= Foxmask =

2003 novel by Juliet Marillier

- First edition cover
- Author: Juliet Marillier
- Language: English
- Series: Saga of the Light Isles
- Genre: Fantasy novel
- Publisher: Pan Macmillan
- Publication date: 2003
- Publication place: Australia
- Media type: Print (Hardback & Paperback)
- Pages: 554 pp (first edition, hardback)
- ISBN: 1-4050-0524-6 (first edition, hardback)
- OCLC: 56445259
- Preceded by: Wolfskin
- Followed by: -

Foxmask is a fantasy novel by Juliet Marillier. It was originally published in Australian in 2003 by Pan Macmillan.

It is the second book of the Saga of the Light Isles, also known as the Children of the Light Isles series.

== Plot summary ==
When Thorvald turns 18, his mother Margaret decides to tell her son the truth about his father's identity. Upon learning that Somerled was his father, Thorvald decided to find the man. With his friend Sam's help, Thorvald begins his journey. Unbeknownst to the two young men, Creidhe, the daughter of Eyvind and Nessa and Thorvald's best friend, stows aboard.

When the boat becomes damaged, they land on a lost isle called the Isle of Storms. The people who live there are in a state of constant fear and distrust. A difficult journey lies ahead for Thorvald, Creidhe, and Sam who will all be needed in order to overcome the troubles of the islanders, known as the Long Knife people, and return home to their lives and their families.
