= The Bridei Chronicles =

The Bridei Chronicles is Juliet Marillier's third series of historical fantasy novels. They depict the tutelage by Broichan, rise to power, and reign of King Bridei I of the Picts in the sixth century.

Like much of Marillier's work, The Bridei Chronicles are rooted in historical fact and many of the principal characters are historical personages. However, a strong element of fantasy is also present, and the author's note makes clear that history is only a starting point for her romantic tales.

== The Dark Mirror (2005) ==
The Dark Mirror is the first book of The Bridei Chronicles, published in 2005.

It tells of Bridei's education under the supervision of Broichan, the king's Druid. Bridei is sent at a very early age by his father Maelchon and mother Anfreda to Broichan at Pitnochie. One night Bridei is woken by the moon and outside discovers a baby of the Good Folk, which he takes in and later names Tuala. As the years pass, Bridei and Tuala begin to fall apart as they come to terms with their destinies. The pair are tested to the ends of their wits until their love for each other blossoms and triumphs. The book ends with Bridei elected as the new king and his announcement of his betrothal to Tuala.

The religion of the Picts is important in this book. One aspect of that religion is a yearly human sacrifice. Bridei participates in the ritual just once, and is so troubled by the experience that he decides there will be no more such sacrifice.

== Blade of Fortriu (2006) ==
Blade of Fortriu is the second book of The Bridei Chronicles, published in 2006.

It tells of Ana and Faolan's trip to the Caitt chieftain Alpin and of Bridei's war on the Gaels. This trip forces the assassin to take on roles that hit close to home. Will Faolan be able to defeat the memories of the past in order to complete his mission? Help comes from two unlikely places and the seeds of friendship form in a man who once thought that concept beyond him.

The main characters, Bridei, his wife Tuala, Faolan, Ana, Drustan, and Alpin, are well crafted. Each of them must make difficult choices. Bridei, in particular, shows restraint and compassion as a war leader.

== The Well Of Shades (2007) ==
The Well Of Shades is the third book of The Bridei Chronicles, published in 2007.

It follows Bridei's rule further and the decisions he has to make concerning the welfare of Fortriu. Faolan becomes a more central character as he keeps his promise to Ana and returns to his homeland. While there he must come face to face with the demons of his past. While in Erin he meets an unlikely travel companion who understands what it is to have blood on your hands. Tuala discovers the origins of her father. Meanwhile, a fair haired princess of the Light Isles threatens to unleash chaos in the court. Christian cleric and priest Colmcille also makes an appearance and shows the people of Bridei's kingdom just what the Christian faith can do. Could his presence ruin what Bridei and Broichan had spent so many years creating; a true Fortriu under one religion?
