= Cybele's Secret =

2007 novel by Juliet Marillier

Cybele’s Secret
- Cybele’s Secret first edition cover.
- Author: Juliet Marillier
- Cover artist: Kinuko Y. Craft
- Language: English
- Genre: Young adult, fantasy
- Publisher: Pan Macmillan
- Publication date: October 2007
- Publication place: Australia
- Media type: Print (Hardback & Paperback)
- Pages: 410 pp (first edition)
- ISBN: 978-0-330-42354-0
- Preceded by: Wildwood Dancing

Cybele's Secret (pronounced /ˈsɪbəliː/ SIB-ə-lee) is a 2007 young adult fantasy novel by Juliet Marillier. It follows the story of Paula who is accompanying her father to Istanbul to purchase a rare artifact of a lost pagan cult. Cybele’s Secret is the companion book to Wildwood Dancing.

== Background ==
Cybele's Secret was first published in Australia in October 2007 by Pan Macmillan in trade paperback format. In December 2007 it was published in the United Kingdom by Tor Books in hardback format and in 2008 it was published in the United States by Knopf Books. Cybele’s Secret joint won the 2008 Sir Julius Vogel Award for best young-adult novel with The Sea-wreck Stranger by Anna Mackenzie. It was also a short-list nominee for the 2007 Aurealis Award for best young-adult novel but lost to Anthony Eaton's Skyfall.

== Synopsis/Plot Summary ==
Cybele's Secret is the sequel to Wildwood Dancing. It is narrated by Paula, the fourth sister of five and a scholar. She accompanies her father on a business trip to Istanbul to try to find a statue of the goddess Cybele.

Paula's father thinks it appropriate to hire a bodyguard for Paula as the streets in the city are a dangerous place for a young, foreign woman. As Paula is about to make a decision on which man she will hire, another, named Stoyan, shows up. He admits to having left his previous boss alone and exposed, which proved fatal for the boss, but Paula hires him anyway.

After a while, they go to a dinner, where Paula meets an influential lady who runs a women's only library and steam room. She invites Paula to come along one day, which Paula gladly accepts, being excited about the prospects of so many books. She begins to research Cybele, to see if it would give her a clue as to where the statue was. She knows that time is running out to find the statue; one of her father's colleagues is already murdered because of it and there are rumours of a religious cult of Cybele's followers somewhere in Istanbul. Paula finds some old records with delicate pictures around the edge, on which appear strange words that only she can see. She soon realises that the faerie folk have given her a task, as they did her older sister Jena several years ago, but does not know what it is, only having a few words from the witch Dragutsa to go off; 'You must help an old friend of mine.' Paula ropes her Stoyan into helping with the quest, and also begins to teach him how to read and write.

To find the statue, Paula must join with a daring and dangerous pirate named Duarte, who has promised a friend that he would return one day to the island where they have found out that the statue is kept. Paula finds herself drawn to him as she also is to Stoyan. They set out for the island on the pirate's ship to find the statue. Paula's father does not know about this. On the island they find many perils, including the influential lady who owns the library that Paula has been using, and who turns out to be the leader of the religious cult. She admits to wanting the statue for herself and followers, and is willing to kill to get it. Paula, Stoyan and Duarte have to journey through a cave and pass certain tests such as helping Tati, (Paula's sister who goes to live with Sorrow in the Faerie realm at the end of Wildwood Dancing) without speaking to or touching her. They achieve this through Stoyan's amazing control of dogs. Then they must choose a gift each. Paula chooses a tapestry of five girls sewn to look like her and her sisters. The influential lady chooses the statue, which Paula, Duarte and Stoyan did not realise was an option.

Another task is that Paula must collect three tiny creatures which sit on her arms and head.

After the many tasks, they come out of the cave into another place on the island. The cave begins to collapse, shaking and dropping stones, with their opponents still inside. Faced with the choice of saving herself or dying with her guard, the cult's leader chooses to die with the guard she took such good care of the whole time.

The statue is placed back where it should belong, with the villagers who live on the island and who are the true worshippers of Cybele.

The adventurers return to Istanbul, upon which Paula eventually realises that yes, she is in love with Stoyan. They decide to get married back at Paula's home, which is a welcome event to everyone, including Stela, who exclaims that maybe since Tati and Jena have had their tasks, and Iulia is married, it will be her turn to go back to the Faerie realm, and she will be able to see Ildephonsus and all her other little friends again.
