= Attila's Treasure =

- Cover of the 1996 Bantam Books edition
- Author: Stephan Grundy
- Language: English
- Publication date: 1996

Attila's Treasure is a 1996 novel written by Stephan Grundy.

== Plot summary ==
Attila's Treasure is a novel in which the setting is the court of the famed warrior Attila. The book also has explorations of Christian and Pagan religious themes and spiritual undertones.

== Reception ==
Jonathan Palmer reviewed Attila's Treasure for Arcane magazine, rating it a 6 out of 10 overall, and stated that "If you're running an Ars Magica campaign, or even Vampire: The Dark Ages, then you're probably into things such as 5th century Hunnish history, and you would be well advised to read this book for its historical and geographical location, as much as for its twisting plot and heavy atmosphere. However, if you don't have such an interest, and you're just looking for an interesting read, you may well find Attila's Treasure a bit too much, especially at 500 pages."

== Reviews ==
- Review by Faren Miller (1996) in Locus, #427 August 1996
- Review by Chris Gilmore (1996) in Interzone, October 1996
- Review by Peter Heck (1997) in Asimov's Science Fiction, February 1997
- Review by Neil Walsh (1998) in SF Site, January 1998, (1998)
- Kirkus
