= Pinnata Castra =

Roman fort in Great Britain

Pinnata Castra (Ancient Greek: Πτερωτον Στρατοπεδον, Pteroton Stratopedon) was a settlement located in the north of the island of Great Britain, featuring in Ptolemy's 2nd century Geography as one of the four places listed as belonging to the Vacomagi tribe. It is also included as Pinnatis in the Ravenna Cosmography.

== Name and status ==
The site was originally referred to by Ptolemy in Ancient Greek as Πτερωτον Στρατοπεδον, which means "Winged Camp". This has been translated back into Latin as Pinnata Castra or sometimes Alata Castra, and was referred to in the locative case as Pinnatis in the Ravenna Cosmography.

Pinnata Castra is listed by Ptolemy as a polis or town. It is uncertain whether the site was a native stronghold or one built by the Romans, who had a preference for locating their sites close to established native sites and giving them names related to the earlier settlements. No purely native settlement is known to have been named by Ptolemy in southern Britain, but such settlements are listed in unoccupied Ireland. Most Roman sites in the north of Britain were not permanent forts but temporary marching camps, which were not normally given names, though it is possible that such a camp could have been given a name as the planned sites of a future fort.

== Location ==
Pinnata Castra has most often been connected with Burghead Fort in modern-day Moray, but its location has been the subject of considerable debate. The archaeologist Ian Richmond identified it in 1922 on placename and archaeological grounds with the Roman legionary fortress at Inchtuthill north of modern-day Perth, which he excavated and believed to have been constructed with merlons, which he translated into Latin as pinnae. This theory was supported in 1949 by O. G. S. Crawford, and is still the identification given by Royal Commission on the Ancient and Historical Monuments of Scotland. Later scholars have rejected this suggestion, pointing out that Ptolemy's coordinates clearly place Pinnata Castra on the Moray coast, a conclusion further supported by the fact that both Ptolemy and the Ravenna Cosmography place Pinnata Castra near Tuesis, which is generally identified with the River Spey.

Plotting the location of known sites in Ptolemy's Geography and adopting relative locations for unknown sites suggests that Pinnata Castra was located just to the east of Burghead. A precursor of the later Pictish fort at Burghead itself remains a strong candidate for the site, but alternative suggestions have included Inverness; the possible Roman camps at Thomshill near Elgin, or Balnageith near Forres; Cluny Hill in Forres or a lost site within Culbin Sands.

Pinnata Castra was one of the four points within Britain that provided Ptolemy with astronomical data, with its longest day being recorded at 18.5 hours, compared to the 17 hours recorded at London, making it the furthest point north at which readings were taken. Its status as the northernmost polis listed suggests it marked the northern limit of the advance of the Roman army of Agricola, from whom Ptolemy is considered to have ultimately derived his data.

== Bibliography ==
- Breeze, David J. (1990). "Agricola in the Highlands?" (PDF). Proceedings of the Society of Antiquaries of Scotland. 120: 55–60.
- Conquest, Robert (2000). "A Note on the 'Civitas' and 'Polis' Names of Scotland: An Alternative Approach". Britannia. 31: 347–350. doi:10.2307/526926. JSTOR 526926.
- Crawford, O. G. S. (2011) [1949]. Topography of Roman Scotland: North of the Antonine Wall. Cambridge: Cambridge University Press. ISBN 9781107684737.
- Grant, Alison E. (2007). Roman military objectives in Britain under the Flavian emperors. BAR British series. Vol. 440. Oxford: Archaeopress. ISBN 9781407301143.
- Isaksen, Leif (2017), The Hilltop Enclosure on Cluny Hill, Forres description, destruction, disappearance (PDF), Lancaster University
- Mann, John C.; Breeze, David J. (1987). "Ptolemy, Tacitus and the tribes of north Britain" (PDF). Proceedings of the Society of Antiquaries of Scotland. 117: 85–91.
- Maxwell, Gordon (2008). "The Roman Penetration of the North in the Late First Century AD". In Todd, Malcolm (ed.). A Companion to Roman Britain. Blackwell Companions to British History. London: John Wiley & Sons. pp. 75–90. ISBN 9780470998854.
- Rhys, Guto (2015). Approaching the Pictish language: historiography, early evidence and the question of Pritenic (PDF) (PhD). University of Glasgow.
- Strang, Alastair (1998). "Recreating a possible Flavian map of Roman Britain with a detailed map for Scotland" (PDF). Proceedings of the Society of Antiquaries of Scotland. 128: 425–440.
