= Daughter of the Forest =

1999 novel by Juliet Marillier

- First edition
- Author: Juliet Marillier
- Cover artist: Neal Armstrong
- Series: Sevenwaters trilogy
- Genre: Historical fantasy
- Publisher: Pan Macmillan Australia
- Publication date: 1999
- Pages: 552
- ISBN: 0-7329-0977-5
- OCLC: 48916215
- Followed by: Son of the Shadows

Daughter of the Forest is an historical fantasy novel by Juliet Marillier first published in 1999. It is loosely based on the legend of the Children of Lir and "The Six Swans" (a story that has many versions, including one by the Brothers Grimm). A girl (Sorcha) must sew six shirts from a painful nettle plant in order to save her brothers from a witch's enchantment, remaining completely mute until the task is finished. Falling in love complicates her mission.

== Plot summary ==
Sorcha, the youngest child of Irish Lord Colum of Sevenwaters, loses her mother at childbirth, and is raised almost entirely by her six older brothers. She is more or less ignored by her father. When her father's new wife, the Lady Oonagh, attacks Sorcha and her brothers, Sorcha alone is able to escape. Sorcha's brothers, however, are turned into swans.

What follows is a twist on the classic tale of "The Six Swans". Sorcha learns that if she can spin six shirts from the painful starwort, remaining absolutely silent until the last one is completed, she can free her brothers from Oonagh's spell. Sorcha agrees to this and spends several years in the forest, hiding from Oonagh as she works on the shirts.

At first she survives in the Forest, relying on the help of the Fair Folk and her only companion—her brother Cormack's dog, Linn. Her brothers are able to visit her twice a year as humans as she labors on her task to make shirts out of starwort, a needle-like plant whose touch is poison and disfigures the hands.

One day, she is raped by two brutal men, who are led to her by the village idiot, who thought her a faery. They also kill Linn, and her brothers find her hurt and bleeding. Padriac heals her while three of her other brothers, (including formerly peaceful Finbar), go out and kill her rapists with the help of the Fair Folk.

After years of solitary struggle, Sorcha is saved from drowning by a British lord, Hugh of Harrowfield (a.k.a. "Red"). When Red returns to Britain, Sorcha unwillingly accompanies him. Red correctly believes that Sorcha has information concerning his brother, Simon, whom Sorcha had nursed back to health after Simon's capture by Lord Colum. Sorcha remains with Red as she continues to work on the shirts.

Though under Red's protection, Sorcha encounters a new danger in the form of Lord Richard, Red's uncle and the one behind the attacks on Sevenwaters. Sorcha must fend off the gross advances of Richard even as she continues silently working to save her brothers. Though she earns true friends in John, Ben, and John's wife Margery, the majority of Red's household believe her to be a witch, and they play cruel tricks on her.

As the days go by, Red and Sorcha gradually fall in love, though they are separated by his need to find Simon and her fear of men after her rape—as well as her belief that he only loves her because the Fair Folk bound him to her as her protector. While his marriage to Elaine, who is Lord Richard's daughter, draws nearer (engaged since they were children) and while Elaine is kind to Sorcha, Lord Richard constantly threatens her.

Red takes Sorcha to a hidden shore, where only he and Simon ever went, and proposes, telling her that he has ended his betrothal to Elaine. She is fearful that he will try to claim his rights as a husband, but he assures her that, if she wants, the marriage will be only in name and will protect her. He gives her a ring and then leaves to search for Simon and find out the truth about Lord Richard's involvement in his brother's capture.

One summer, in Harrowfield while Red is gone, Sorcha is caught with Conor, one of her brothers, and is accused of adultery. Lord Richard turns everyone against Sorcha and decides to burn her at stake. On the day the shirts are finished, all six of her brothers come flying to her. Red returns home, outraged when he sees Sorcha tied at the stake. Unable to speak, Sorcha quickly throws the finished shirts on her brothers, but because she did not have time to finish one of the sleeves Finbar is cursed with one wing.

Her brothers are extremely protective of her, and declare her marriage invalid. They refuse to allow her to be alone with him until Sorcha insists on it, and she is the one to tell Red good-bye, believing he will forget her once she is gone and still under the delusion that he only loves her because of the Fair Folk's intervention.

He lets her go, and Sorcha and her brothers return to Sevenwaters, only to find it a mess. Some peasants recognize them and inform them that their father is not well, and they hasten to the palace, where Donal, Lord Colum's former general, informs them that their step-mother has recently disappeared.

The family slowly rebuilds Sevenwaters, and Sorcha finds out from the Lady of the Forest that Red was under no spell, but truly loved her. This causes her much pain until one day, he shows up and declares that he has abdicated his rule and wants to stay with her, and Sorcha kisses him so passionately that she makes Liam, her eldest brother, blush.

Almost all of the mysteries are solved, except for their half brother (the son of Lord Colum and Lady Oonagh). Two of the brothers set out to find him, while Conor travels away with the Druids. The seven children of Sevenwaters thus separate to lead their individual lives. Liam stays with Sorcha in Sevenwaters, and Finbar disappears in the waters, leaving only a feather behind.

== Characters ==
=== Sevenwaters Family ===
==== Sorcha ====
Sister to Liam, Diarmid, twins Cormack and Conor, Finbar and Padriac and daughter of Lord Colum of Sevenwaters. Sorcha has black hair and wide green eyes and bears a strong resemblance to their mother, who died birthing her. She is a healer, and skilled in herb lore. She can also play the harp and flute very well, and though she can hem and sew shirts well enough, she has no skill for embroidery or even fine needlework. She is sometimes said to be the "thread that weaves her brothers together".

Throughout the novel, it is her task to break her brothers' spell, and she can only do so if she sews a shirt for each of them out of a brittle, needle-like plant that causes her hands to wrinkle and deform like that of an old woman's. She is not allowed to speak or communicate through pictures/writing during this time, or else her brothers will never be free.

While hiding in the forest, she is brutally raped, which drives a wedge between herself and Red when they first meet and as they slowly fall in love. She loves her brothers dearly and has a special bond with the Fair Folk, as well as the ability to hear their voices and communicate with the Lady of the Forest and the Bright One.

Though it takes her awhile to realize it, she falls in love with Red, but leaves because she thinks he only loves her because the Fair Folk bound him to her when they named him her protector. When she realizes that they, in fact, did no such thing, she is heartbroken, but he abdicates his rule, leaves Briton, and joins her in Sevenwaters and she is overjoyed again.

==== Colum ====
Lord and Ruler of Sevenwaters, father to Sorcha and her six brothers, husband to the Lady Oonagh. He was once a carefree, handsome, and happy man who loved his wife dearly, but then she died and he threw himself into his role as the Lord of Sevenwaters, becoming proud and stern.

He has conflict with both Finbar and Sorcha at the beginning of the story, because both remind him so much of his wife—Sorcha's looks and Finbar's stillness are both qualities she once had. He angrily snaps against Finbar's insistence that the Britons are human too, and treats Sorcha as if she does not exist, though it is later revealed that he loves her very much.

Lady Oonagh effectively takes over his mind, but when his children disappear he is so shaken by loss that he regains some of his freedom.

==== Liam ====
Eldest brother of Sorcha. Liam is the peacekeeper and leader of Colum's children and a skilled warrior. He is the heir of Sevenwaters. Before he is turned into a swan, he is engaged to Eilis, though her father marries her away after he disappears.

He, like most of her brothers, is against her marrying Red. He hates Lady Oonagh bitterly for trying to poison Eilis, and tries to get his father to realize her duplicity, though she stops him before he can.

==== Diarmid ====
Sorcha's second eldest brother. Diarmid is a charismatic adventurer and a warrior, as well as very handsome. He has twin dimples that many find charming, and is the most bespelled of all the brothers by Lady Oonagh until her true nature is revealed. Consequently, he hates the sorceress the most.

==== Cormack ====
Twin to Conor and brother to Sorcha, and also a warrior. He loves battle and his dog, Linn, and Lady Ooangh uses his love for the dog against him by making him hit her. He is the first to figure out Sorcha's task.

==== Conor ====
Brother to Sorcha and twin to Cormack. Conor is a scholar rather than a warrior and is often the one to whom Sorcha goes for advice. He is also a druid, and able to read others' minds/hearts. Throughout the novel, he is the only one Sorcha can communicate with, as he is the only one who can "speak" to her without having her break her vow.

One of the only ones who is fluent in Briton, he acts as a translator between Red and the Sevenwater family, though he obviously has no liking for the man. He is furious that Red is not there to protect Sorcha when she is about to get burned alive.

==== Finbar ====
Brother to Sorcha and, along with Conor, one of Sorcha's favorite siblings. Sorcha refers to Finbar as her other half and can communicate with him without speaking. Finbar is often rebellious against his father. At the end of the novel, he is the brother who has one swan wing remaining, and it is implied that he mated while he was still a swan, and that because swans mate for life, he can never be fully human.

He suspects Lady Ooangh from the first and is the most protective of Sorcha, insisting that she run away and abandon them rather than subjugate herself to such pain. He can also see visions of the future.

==== Padriac ====
Sorcha's youngest brother. Padriac is skilled with animals and is often caught up in fixing things and finding out how things work. He is the most innocent of her brothers.

=== Britons ===
==== Hugh of Harrowfield ====
British lord and ruler of Harrowfield. Goes by the name of "Red" because of his red hair. Rescues Sorcha from drowning and takes her to his home. Eventually, he falls in love and marries her.

He is characterized as a big man and handsome, (all the village girls want him), and a skillful ruler. He loves his younger brother Simon and is desperate to find out what happens to him.

The Bright One and Lady of the Forest bind him to Sorcha as her protector, and he swears to take care of her no matter the cost. He defends her from his men, his mother, and eventually his uncle. The only time he gets truly angry with her is when she sneaks out alone to gather supplies for her shirts and his uncle corners her.

Eventually, though he is unable to do so at first, he learns how to communicate with her; although he cannot read her thoughts like Conor or Finbar can. Through this they continued to build their relationship while she could not speak.

==== Lady Anne ====
Red's mother, she is suspicious and bitter against Sorcha at first, but respects her son too much to interfere. She blames Sorcha for disturbing her household and indirectly because Sorcha's people allegedly killed Simon.

She is close to her brother, Richard, and so Red does not trust her completely, but after Sorcha is imprisoned and accused of treason and adultery, Lady Anne gives her the shirts she has been sewing, making it clear that she is only doing so on Red's orders.

==== Ben ====
One of Red's closest friends and advisers, he protects Sorcha during her time at Harrowfield. Ben was taken in as a foster son by Red's father, and is vibrant and cheerful.

Though he catches Sorcha "committing adultery", (she was really just hugging her brother), he believes in her innocence, saying that no one who looked at Red the way she did could turn unfaithful. However, because Richard, (Red's uncle), has her guarded so securely, he goes to find Red, (who is off rescuing Simon), instead.

==== John ====
One of Red's closest friend and advisers, he is more withdrawn and quieter than Ben, but just as protective of Sorcha, especially after she saves his wife's life. He later dies – sabotaged by Lord Richard's men while guarding Sorcha.

He is married to Margery and they have a son together.

==== Margery ====
John's wife and one of Sorcha's few friends at Harrowfield. She is pregnant with John's child and almost loses the babe, but Sorcha manages to save them. There is a period of time after her husband dies that she is completely withdrawn and shuts everyone else out, but eventually she pulls through to be there for Sorcha.

==== Simon ====
Red's brother. He is captured and tortured by Colum's men shortly before the arrival of Oonagh. Sorcha nurses him back to health, though he disappears before Oonagh's attack on Sorcha and her brothers. It is later revealed that he was kept safe by the Fair Folk, and he fell in love with Sorcha and wanted her to wait for him. He is said to be intense and handsome, and always jealous of his brother.

==== Elaine ====
Beautiful and wealthy, she is Richard's daughter and Red's betrothed. She was also Red and Simon's childhood friend. Her father sent Simon to die because Elaine fell in love with him, and Simon cannot inherit because he is the youngest son.

She is shown to be kind and has a mind of her own—befriending Sorcha even though the others shun her. Elaine is also the one to inform Red's household that he has cancelled their betrothal to marry Sorcha.

=== Others ===
==== Donal ====
Master of Arms at Sevenwaters, he served Lord Colum for fourteen years, training all Sorcha's brothers and watching over the army. He is dismissed after Simon's escape.

==== Father Brian ====
Christian Hermit who lives near Sevenwaters, teaches languages, reading and writing to some of Lord Colum's children. He helps Sorcha and Finbar hide Simon, and is murdered by Lady Oonagh.

==== Seamus Redbeard ====
Neighbor and Lord Colum's closest ally. His daughter, Eilis, is engaged to Liam.

==== Eilis Redbeard ====
Called "boring" by Sorcha, she is engaged to Liam and loves him dearly. When he disappears, her father marries her to another Lord, who turns out to be a traitor. She has a son with this man, though it is implied that he is cheating on her with Lady Oonagh.

==== Fat Janis ====
Head of the kitchen, she was a Tinker woman who settled at Sevenwaters. One of the few characters to appear in all three books of the trilogy

==== Lady Oonagh ====
Stepmother to Sorcha and wife of Colum. Oonagh, wanting her son by Colum to inherit Sevenwaters, attacks Sorcha and her brothers and turns the boys into swans. Even before then she tries to tear the family apart—attacking each sibling with what they love most (Cormack's dog, Liam's wife, etc.). In Child of the Prophecy it is revealed that Oonagh is a fallen member of the Fair Folk with significant magical powers.

== Literary significance and reception ==
Jackie Cassada of the Library Journal said, "The author's keen understanding of Celtic paganism and early Irish Christianity adds texture to a rich and vibrant novel that belongs in most fantasy collections."

Publishers Weekly said, "Though the novel features a stereotypically happy ending and leans more toward romance than fantasy, Marillier is a fine folklorist and a gifted narrator who has created a wholly appealing and powerful character in this daughter of the forest."

== Allusions and references ==
=== Characters of Irish mythology mentioned in the novel ===
- Deirdre

== Publication history ==
- 1999, Australia, Pan Macmillan ISBN 978-0-7329-0977-2, Pub date 1 April 1999, trade paperback
- 2000, Australia, Pan Macmillan ISBN 978-0-330-36193-4, Pub date 1 March 2000, paperback
- 2000, USA, Tor Books, ISBN 978-0-312-84879-8 Pub date 5 May 2000, hardcover
- 2001, USA, Tor Books, ISBN 978-0-312-87530-5 Pub date 4 March 2001, trade paperback
- 2002, USA, Tor Books, ISBN 978-0-7653-4343-7 Pub date 18 February 2002, paperback
- 2000, UK, Voyager Books, ISBN 978-0-00-224736-8 Pub date 3 April 2000, paperback

== Awards and nominations ==
- Daughter of the Forest won the 2001 American Library Association Alex Award
- Daughter of the Forest was a finalist for the 2000 Aurealis Awards for Fantasy Novel

== Sources, references, external links, quotations ==
- Daughter of the Forest entry on official Juliet Marillier website
- Interview with Juliet Marillier at Slow Glass Books shortly after Daughter of the Forest was published.
- In-depth interview with Juliet Marillier at Writer Unboxed, where Marillier also blogs.
- Review of Daughter of the Forest by the fantasy author Victoria Strauss
