= Burnfield =

Roman camp in Scotland

- Rothiemay
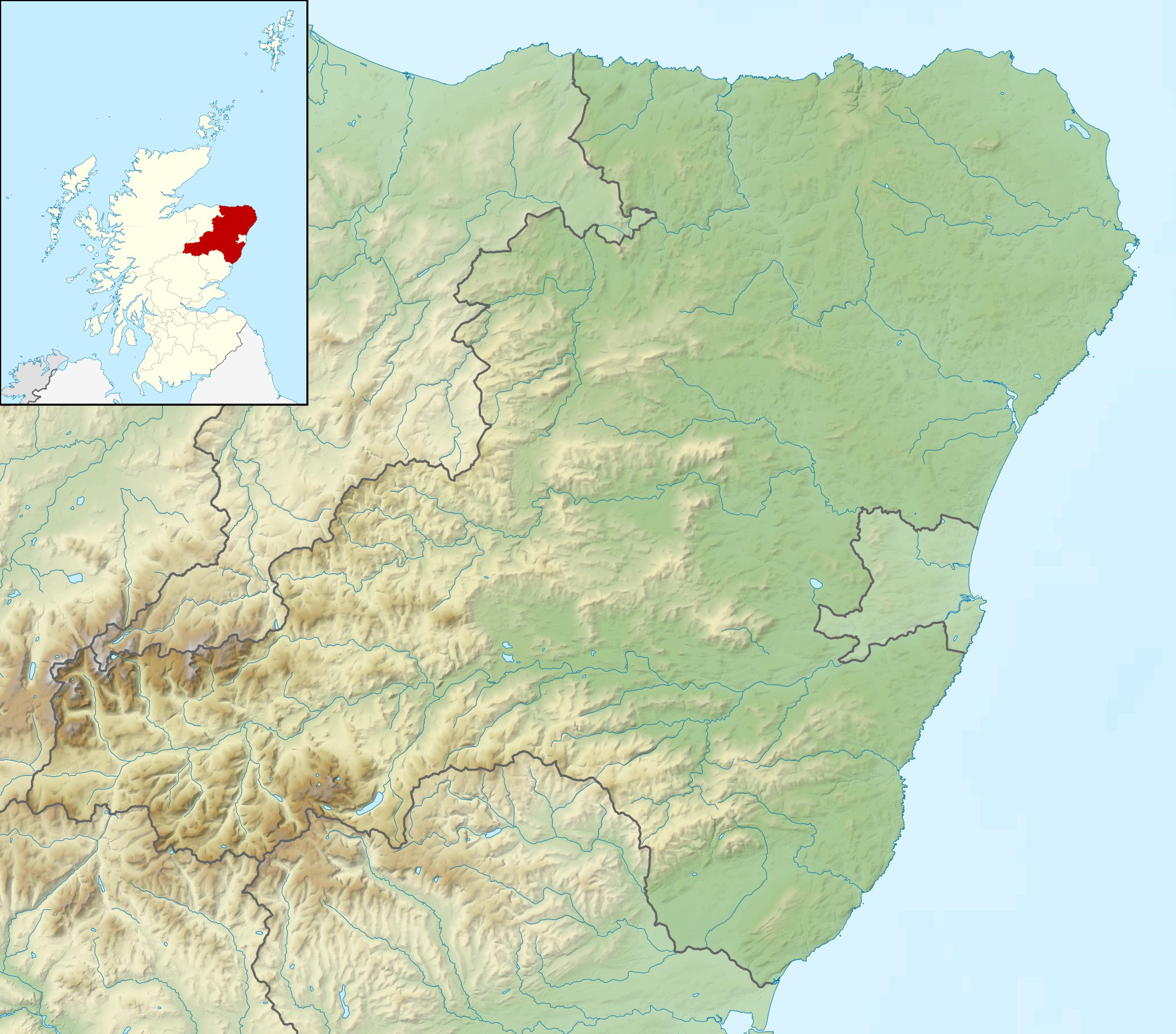
- Location within Aberdeenshire
- 57.5182°N 2.7672°W
- Type: Marching camp (probable)

Site notes
- Discovered: 1982
- Condition: Cropmark

Burnfield, located on the banks of the River Deveron in Aberdeenshire, Scotland, near Milltown of Rothiemay, is the site of a probable Roman marching camp, first discovered by aerial photography in 1982.

The area enclosed by the camp is not known but it covered at least 9.72 hectares (24.0 acres) and the topography of the site makes it unlikely to have exceeded 16 hectares (40 acres). The ditch was found to be only 0.69 metres (2.3 ft) deep, as a result of which the site has been compared to nearby camps at Auchinhove and Ythan Wells.

== Bibliography ==
- "Burnfield". Canmore. Royal Commission on the Ancient and Historical Monuments of Scotland.
- "Burnfield". Aberdeenshire Sites and Monuments Record. Aberdeenshire Council.
- Leslie, Alan F. (1995). Roman temporary camps in Britain (PhD). University of Glasgow.
