= Stephan Grundy =

American novelist and heathen scholar (1967–2021)

- Born: Stephan Scott Grundy; June 28, 1967; New York City, U.S.
- Died: September 29, 2021 (aged 54); Shinrone, County Offaly, Ireland
- Other name: Kveldulf Gundarsson
- Education: Southern Methodist University; University of Cambridge (PhD)
- Occupation: Writer
- Known for: Germanic Neopaganism; Science fiction novels
- Spouse: Melodi Grundy

Stephan Scott Grundy (June 28, 1967 – September 29, 2021), also known by the pen-name Kveldulf Gundarsson, was an American author, scholar, goði and proponent of Asatru. He published more than two dozen books and several papers. He is best known for his modern adaptations of legendary sagas and was also a non-fiction writer on Germanic mythology, Germanic paganism, and Germanic neopaganism.

== Life and career ==
Grundy was born in New York City and grew up in Dallas, where he studied English and German philology at Southern Methodist University. In 1995, he received his PhD from the Department of Anglo-Saxon, Norse and Celtic at the University of Cambridge with a dissertation on the Norse god Odin: "The Cult of Óðinn: God of Death?".

His entire catalog of works was given to The Three Little Sisters, who has spent the last few years, redoing all of his previously published and unpublished work with consent of his widow Melodi Grundy.

Before publishing his first novel, Grundy published, as Kveldulf Gundarsson, two books on Germanic neopaganism and Germanic magic. He served as Lore Warden and Master of the Elder Training Program for the Ring of Troth (now The Troth) and carried on the organization's tradition of being based in scholarship, started by Edred Thorsson. Mattias Gardell also regards him as important in the organization's move to the left and development of a "strict antiracist and antisexist ideology." He edited and co-wrote both editions of The Troth's handbook, Our Troth, and has written other works on ancient and modern Germanic paganism and Germanic culture.

He is cited by other writers on Germanic paganism inside and outside academia, for example as Grundy by Jenny Blain in her discussion of the social role of seiðr in Iceland, also as Grundy by Julia Bolton Holloway on pagan priestesses, and by Charlotte Hardman and Graham Harvey in their survey of neo-paganism for editing Our Troth as well as having "clarified the group's objection to fascism and racism".

He died in Shinrone, County Offaly, Ireland, where he was studying medicine.

== Novels ==
=== Rhinegold ===
Grundy began working on his first complete novel during his freshman year at Southern Methodist University. Originally, the novel was intended to be based on the Anglo-Saxon epic poem Beowulf, but Grundy was convinced by his professor that the Nibelung legend would be a more appropriate basis for a first novel.

Grundy wrote most of the novel in a dormitory at the University of St Andrews, Scotland, where he spent one year as an exchange student. He also spent a year as an exchange student in Bonn, Germany – virtually at the foot of the Drachenfels - spending some of his time on research for his novel (which also led him all across Scandinavia). Rhinegold – a retelling of the entire Sigurð cycle dedicated to, among others, Richard Wagner and J. R. R. Tolkien – came out in 1994, and quickly developed into an international best-seller.

Terri Windling identified Rhinegold as one of the best fantasy debuts of 1994, describing it as "both scholarly and entertaining".

=== Attila's Treasure ===
Two years later, 1996, Grundy completed Attila's Treasure, focused less on Attila the Hun than on Grundy's favorite legendary figure, Hagen. This novel, too, was an international success, but to a lesser degree than the forerunner novel Rhinegold.

=== Gilgamesh ===
This was followed in 1999 by Gilgamesh, a modern adaptation of the Sumerian Epic of Gilgamesh that attempts to address directly the homosexual nature of the original text largely ignored by modern scholars. This was less well received than the two earlier novels.

=== Falcon Dreams series ===
With Melodi Lammond-Grundy, Grundy has since published the Falcon Dreams series, a trilogy first published in German and available in English in e-book format: Falcon's Flight (2000), Eagle and Falcon (2002), and Falcon's Night (2002).

== Bibliography ==
=== Books ===
- Kveldulf Gundarsson: Teutonic Magic: The Magical & Spiritual Practices of the Germanic People, Llewellyn, 1990, ISBN 0-87542-291-8
- Kveldulf Gundarsson: Teutonic Religion: Folk Beliefs & Practices of the Northern Tradition, Llewellyn, 1993, ISBN 0-87542-260-8
- KveldúlfR Hagan Gundarsson, ed.: Our Troth, The Ring of Troth, 1993
- Stephan Grundy: Miscellaneous Studies Towards the Cult of Odinn, Everett, WA: Vikar, 1994; Troth Publications, 2014, ISBN 978-1-941136-03-4.
- Stephan Grundy: Rhinegold, Michael Joseph, 1994, ISBN 0-7181-3742-6
- Stephan Grundy: Attila's Treasure, Bantam, 1996, ISBN 0-553-37774-4
- Stephan Grundy: Gilgamesh, William Morrow, 1999, ISBN 0-380-97574-2
- Stephan Grundy and Melodi Lammond-Grundy: Falcon's Flight, 2000, e-book Double Dragon, 2006, ISBN 1-55404-326-3
- Stephan Grundy and Melodi Lammond-Grundy: Eagle and Falcon, 2002, e-book Double Dragon, 2006, ISBN 1-55404-329-8
- Stephan Grundy and Melodi Lammond-Grundy: Falcon's Night, 2002, e-book Double Dragon, 2006, ISBN 1-55404-351-4
- Kveldúlf Gundarsson, ed.: Our Troth, 2nd ed. volume 1 History and Lore Booksurge, 2006, ISBN 1-4196-3598-0; volume 2 Living the Troth Booksurge, 2007, ISBN 978-1-4196-3614-1
- Kveldulf Gundarsson: Elves, Wights, and Trolls, Studies Towards the Practice of Germanic Heathenry 1, iUniverse, 2007, ISBN 0-595-42165-2
- Stephan Grundy: The Cult of Ódinn: God of Death?, Troth Publications, 2014, ISBN 978-1-941136-01-0 (hardcover). Reprint of 1995 PhD dissertation.
- Stephan Grundy: Beowulf, TLS, 2019, ISBN 978-1-989033-10-4

=== Articles ===
- Stephan Grundy, "Chapter Four: Freyja and Frigg" in Sandra Billington and Miranda Green, eds., The Concept of the Goddess, Routledge, 1996, republished Taylor & Francis e-Library, 2000, ISBN 0-203-45638-6, pp. 56–67.
- Stephan Grundy, "Shapeshifting and Berserkergang" in Carol Poster and Richard J. Utz, eds., Translation, Transformation and Transubstantiation in the Late Middle Ages, Disputatio 3 (1998), pp. 104–22.
- Kveldulf Gundarsson: numerous articles in Idunna and Mountain Thunder.
