= Kelly McCullough =

American novelist

- Born: Kelly David McCullough; 1967 (age 58–59)
- Occupation: Author
- Writing career
- Genres: Fantasy; science fiction
- Website: kellymccullough.com

Kelly David McCullough (born 1967) is a contemporary American author of fantasy and science fiction novels living in Wisconsin.

== Early life ==
Before becoming an author, McCullough acted in the Minnesota Renaissance Festival, the Colorado Renaissance Festival, and the Arizona Renaissance Festival.

== Writing career ==
McCullough's critically acclaimed novel WebMage was released in 2006, followed by Cybermancy in 2007, CodeSpell in 2008, MythOS in 2009, and Spellcrash in 2010. The Fallen Blade series began with Broken Blade in 2011, and five other books followed. He has written three middle-grade novels: Magic, Madness, and Mischief and its sequel Spirits, Spells, and Snark and stand-alone School for Sidekicks.

Some of his 20 published short stories include The Uncola, When Jabberwocks Attack, and The Totally Secret Origin of Foxman: Excerpts from an EPIC Autobiography, a Tor.Com original; he also has written a number of poems, including The Bees: An Edgar Allan Pooh Poem. His non-fiction work includes an illustrated collection that is part of a robust middle school physical science curriculum that was funded by the National Science Foundation and has been adopted by several state boards of education, the Interactions in Physical Science curriculum.

Awards include the 2000 "Writers of the Future" winner, an international competition begun by L. Ron Hubbard.

== Political career ==
McCullough has been a county board supervisor for Dunn County, WI since 2010. He was elected as chair of the Board of Supervisors in 2022 and again in 2024. He also served as a City Council Alder for Menomonie, WI from 2021 to 2023.

== Personal life ==
McCullough lives with his wife, Laura, and a number of cats.

In 2008, McCullough donated his archive to the department of Rare Books and Special Collections at Northern Illinois University.

== Bibliography ==
=== Adult novels ===
==== Fallen Blade series ====
1. Broken Blade
2. Bared Blade
3. Crossed Blades
4. Blade Reforged
5. Drawn Blades
6. Darkened Blades

==== Webmage series ====
1. WebMage
2. Cybermancy
3. Codespell
4. MythOS
5. Spellcrash

=== Middle-grade novels ===
==== Magic, Madness, and Mischief series ====
1. Magic, Madness, and Mischief
2. Spirits, Spells, and Snark

==== Academy of Metahuman Operatives ====
- School for Sidekicks
- "The Totally Secret Origin of Foxman: Excerpts from an EPIC Autobiography" (short story)
