= Son of the Shadows =

Historical fantasy novel by Juliet Marillier

- Hardcover USA edition (Tor Books)
- Author: Juliet Marillier
- Series: Sevenwaters trilogy
- Genre: Historical Fantasy
- Publisher: Pan Macmillan
- Publication date: 1 September 2000, Paperback Edition, Australia
- Pages: 462
- ISBN: 978-0-7329-1029-7 (Paperback Edition, Australia)
- OCLC: 46874804
- Preceded by: Daughter of the Forest
- Followed by: Child of the Prophecy

Son of the Shadows is a historical fantasy novel by Juliet Marillier and the second book in the Sevenwaters Trilogy first published in 2000. It follows the path of Sorcha and Red's third child, Liadan, a girl who lives outside the pattern of the 'Fair Folk', also known as Túatha Dé Danann. Son of the Shadows won the 2001 Aurealis Awards for Fantasy Novel.

== Plot summary ==
In this novel, Liadan grows up in Sevenwaters with her twin brother Sean and her older sister Niamh. They are the offspring of Sorcha and Iubdan (formerly Hugh of Harrowfield). Liadan follows in her mothers tradition in learning the healing arts. Niamh has great beauty and is 'expected' to wed Eamonn, a neighbouring chieftain. Eamonn actually asks for the hand of Liadan, she says that she will give him an answer in one year. While staying at Sevenwaters, Eamonn tells a tale of a recent attack by a band of mercenaries. Upon this attack, all his men were killed, and his life was spared by a man called the Painted Man. He swears that he will kill him. During the festival of Imbolc, a young druid named Ciarán tells the tale of Aengus Óg and Caer Ibormeith and catches the fancy of Niamh, they are soon having a secret love affair. Liadan discovers their secret during a walk in the forest. When the truth comes out, Ciarán leaves the Druids and Sevenwaters and Niamh is forced to marry the Uí Néill chieftain, Fionn.

Liadan goes with her sister on the trip to her new home and on the way back she is kidnapped by an outlaw and brought to the camp of "The Painted Man." In order to attempt to save the life of their smith who was injured in an accident. She accepts the task and eventually falls in love with Bran, their leader. When Bran finds out that she is actually daughter of Hugh of Horrowfield, he sends her back home. When she returns to Sevenwaters, she finds she is pregnant with Bran's child. The Tuatha Dé Danann demand that she and her son remain in the forest, but she refuses to comply. With the help of Finbar she realises that she has his gift of sight and the ability to read and heal the minds of others.

Sean, Liadan's brother and heir to Sevenwaters, wants to purchase the Painted Man's fighting force in their long battle for the sacred islands. All of the leaders go to a counsel to discuss the feud with the Britons. Liadan and her sister visit Sean's future bride and Eamonn's sister at his estate called Sídhe Dubh. During this visit Liadan discovers that her sisters husband has been beating and abusing her, she uses her mind gifts to help Niamh. With the help of Bran they plan on secretly taking Niamh out of Sídhe Dubh and take her to a Christian nunnery where she can be safe. At the last moment Eamonn and Fionn return and attack Bran and Gull as they escape with Niamh. Eamonn returns from the chase and tells the tale of how Niamh slips on the rocks and fell into the bog and died, all that remained was a cord that Liadan made for Niamh that held a white stone given to her by Ciarán.

Liadan finally gives birth to her son and her mother and father realise when the child is born that his father (Bran) must have been the son of John and Margery, kinsman of Iubdan when he was Lord of Horrowfield. Liadan names the child Johnny. Shortly after the birth of Johnny, Sorcha dies. But before her death Liadan tells Sorcha, Iubdan and Finbar the story of Niamh's abuse by her husband; the escape from Sídhe Dubh with the help of Bran; and her belief that Niamh is not dead. On her deathbed Sorcha tells Iubdin that he must return to Harrowfield and learn the truth about John and Margery's son. Ciarán returned in hiding as a tinker during the ceremony for Sorcha. He tells Liadan that Niamh is indeed alive and safe. He also tells her the truth of why they could not wed. Ciarán is the son of Lord Colum and the Lady Oonagh, he is half brother to Niamh's mother. So their union was forbidden by blood. This was why they were not allowed to wed and that he could never be a druid since he carried the blood of the sorceress Lady Oonagh. Ciarán gives Liadan a gift for helping rescue Niamh for her abusive husband and returning her to Ciarán, a mysterious raven Liadan names Fiacha.

Bran comes to Sevenwaters in secret to meet with Sean and meets Liadan, she tells him of his son. After Bran leaves, Liadan has a vision of her Uncle Liam's death; a vision of Eamonn telling Aisling that she could not marry Sean and then her suicide. They then learn that Fionn was recently strangled in his sleep. Liam was indeed killed by a Britons arrow and his nephew Sean takes control of Sevenwaters. Sean fearful for Aisling convinces Liadan to go to Sídhe Dubh to bring Aisling back so they can be married. Liadan has had visions of Eamonn torturing Bran. When she arrives at Sídhe Dubh she learns from Eamonn that he indeed has Bran held prisoner. She makes a deal with Eamonn, in exchange for not revealing that Eamonn betrayed his kinsman Liam and sacrificed his life in exchange for the Painted Man capture. Aisling will be allowed to go Sevenwaters and Liadan can leaves with Bran and Gull if she can find them and leave before dusk. With the help of some magic and Fiacha they make it safely through the bog that surrounds Sídhe Dubh. Liadan learns Bran's hidden truth about his childhood during her fight to bring him back from the torture inflicted on him. She reveals this to her father Iubdan and she convinces Bran that his future might lie in returning to his roots at Harrowfield in Briton, while his men talk of setting up a school for warriors.

== Character list ==
- Liadan: Youngest child of Red and Sorcha, with the gift of Sight and the ability to resist the Fair Folk.
- Niamh: Sorcha and Red's oldest child.
- Sean: Brother to Niamh, twin of Liadan. Only heir to Sevenwaters. He and Liadan can speak directly mind to mind.
- Liam: Eldest brother of Sorcha. Liam is the current Lord of Sevenwaters.
- Conor: Brother to Sorcha, now leader of the Druids.
- Finbar: Brother to Sorcha, he was left with a swans wing as an arm at the end of Daughter of the Forest.
- Painted Man aka Bran: Mercenary for hire with a dedicated band of followers. In actuality, son of John and Margery of Harrowfield, originally named John
- Sorcha: Sister to Liam, Diarmid, twins Cormack and Conor, Finbar and Padriac and daughter of Lord Colum of Sevenwaters. Wife to Iubdan
- Iubdan: Husband of Sorcha, formerly Hugh of Harrowfield, British lord and ruler of Harrowfield. Goes by "Red" or "the Big Man."
- Ciarán: A young druid, in actuality the son of Lord Colum and the Lady Oonagh, he falls in love with Niamh.
- Fionn: A chieftain's son of the Uí Néill, he weds Niamh and abuses her.
- Eamonn: Grandson of Seamus Redbeard, Lord of Sídhe Dubh. Pursues Liadan as a wife, even after learning of Johnny's conception.
- Aisling: Eamonn's younger sister, betrothed to Sean.
- Janis: The kitchen woman, a tinker woman who settled at Severwaters. Known as "Fat Janis" in Daughter of the Forest. One of the few characters to appear in all three books of the trilogy
- Evan: The smith in the Band of the Painted Man, Liadan with the help of the Chief removed his injured arm and attempts to save his life.
- Gull: Member of the Band of the Painted Man, second in command and Bran's best friend, brings Liadan into the camp of the Painted Man to attempt to save the Evan the smith
- Snake: Member of the Band of the Painted Man, third in command
- Dog: Member of the Band of the Painted Man, Liadan mercifully ends his life after Eamonn's men leave him mortally wounded on the road
- Spider: Member of the Band of the Painted Man
- Otter: Member of the Band of the Painted Man
- Rat: Member of the Band of the Painted Man, he takes care of Johnny when Liadan and Johnny are with the band of the Painted Man
- Padriac: Sorcha's youngest brother. He became a seaman and travelled the world.
- Johnny: Liadan and Bran's son
- Fiacha: A raven given to Laidan by Ciarán who follows her everywhere.
- Danny Walker: A tinker (relative of Janis) from Kerry, he plays the pipes at Sorcha's funeral
- Margery: Bran's mother who is killed by bandits and leaves little Johnny hidden under the floorboards
- Rory: The man who finds Bran as a 3-year-old hidden under the floorboards, he abuses him and Bran kills him at the age of 9.

== Literary significance and reception ==
Publishers Weekly said that "The story, though a bit light on the magic and heavy on the romantic, is reminiscent of Jennifer Roberson's Cheysuli series. Fantasy addicts should love it".

Jackie Cassada in The Library Journal said "Marillier blends old legends with original storytelling to produce an epic fantasy that belongs in most libraries".

Booklist in 2001 said that "Marillier's virtuosic pacing and vivid, filmic style make this an engaging continuation of one of the last year's best fantasies".

== Allusions and references ==
=== Characters of Irish mythology mentioned ===
Spellings shown below are the one used in the novel

- Túatha Dé Danann: The "Fair Folk"
- Fomhóire: The "Old Ones"
- Brighid
- Dana: mother goddess
- Morrígan
- Lugh
- Dadga: "The Good God"
- Díancécht: healing god
- Manannán mac Lir: god of the Sea
- Eithne: The Sight is said to have come from her.

=== Celtic Seasonal Festivals mentioned ===
- Samhain: 1 November
- Imbolc: 1 February
- Beltaine: 1 May
- Lugnasad: 1 August
- Meán Geimhridh: winter solstice
- Meán Earraigh: spring equinox
- Meán Samhraidh: summer solstice
- Meán Fómhair: autumn equinox

=== Allusions to actual geography ===
- Tirconnell: Fionn of the Uí Néill lives here
- Isle of Man: Conor tells the story of the first guardian of Sevenwaters, Fergus and his trip to the sacred islands south of the Isle of Man.
- Cumbria: Northwoods, the Briton who took control of the sacred islands is from Cumbria.
- Ulster: Sevenwaters and Sídhe Dubh is within Ulster.
- Kerry: Dan Walker the tinker is from Kerry and Ciarán is returning there with him.
- Elvington: The village where little Johnny (Bran) loses his mother and taken in and abused by Rory.

== Publication history ==
- 2000, Australia, Pan Macmillan ISBN 978-0-7329-1029-7, Pub Date 01 Sept 2000, Trade Paperback
- 2001, Australia, Pan Macmillan ISBN 978-0-330-36267-2, Pub Date 1 July 2001, Paperback
- 2001, UK, Voyager Books, ISBN 978-0-00-224737-5 Pub Date 5 Feb 2001, Hardcover
- 2002, UK, Voyager Books, ISBN 978-0-00-648604-6 Pub Date 2 Jan 2002, Paperback
- 2001, USA, Tor Books, ISBN 978-0-312-84880-4 Pub date 18 May 2001, Hardcover
- 2002, USA, Tor Books, ISBN 978-0-312-87529-9 Pub Date 6 March 2002, Trade Paperback

== Awards and nominations ==
Son of the Shadows won the 2001 Aurealis Awards for Fantasy Novel
