= The Sevenwaters series =

Historical fantasy series by Juliet Marillier

The Sevenwaters series is a historical fantasy series by New Zealand-born author Juliet Marillier, first published as three novels between 1999 and 2001, and then later extended. The series includes six novels: Daughter of the Forest (1999), Son of the Shadows (2000), Child of the Prophecy (2001), Heir to Sevenwaters (2008), Seer of Sevenwaters (2010), and Flame of Sevenwaters (2012).

== Plot summary ==
Set mainly in 9th- century Ireland and Britain, the series covers four generations in the family of Sevenwaters, which enjoys a special relationship with the people of the Otherworld. As well as battles between the Irish Celts and the Britons, internal conflicts between neighbouring landholders are integral to the plots. However, all six books carry a strong romance element. All the books are narrated in the first person by young women of the family.

=== Daughter of the Forest ===
Daughter of the Forest is based loosely on "The Six Swans" (a story that has many versions, one of which is recounted by Hans Christian Andersen). A 13-year-old girl, Sorcha, (pronounced Sor-ka or sometimes Ser-ha) must sew six shirts from a painful nettle plant in order to save her brothers from a witch's enchantment. They have been turned into swans and can only be returned to their true forms if she creates a shirt for each brother with her own hands - and she must remain completely mute until the task is finished. Living in hiding, Sorcha must avoid discovery, survive off the land, and toil night and day to complete her task without the benefit of any tools of the trade, using only what the forest around her can provide--all while keeping silent and bearing unfathomable loneliness. Terrible events hinder her progress and eventually take her further and further away from her home. As months and even years pass by, Sorcha's lonely existence is only brightened by her hope of breaking the spell on her brothers....and a foreign man nicknamed 'Red'.

=== Son of the Shadows ===
Son of the Shadows is the story of Sorcha's younger daughter, Liadan (Lee-a-dan). Liadan is an exceptionally talented healer who is also supernaturally gifted; receiving sporadic visions of the present and future, able to hear and see beings of the Otherworld, and she has also inherited her mother's ability to communicate silently, mind-to-mind, with her twin brother Sean. While traveling through a small village, Liadan is taken by a pair of men belonging to a notorious band of outlaws. Despite a fearsome reputation, these strange warriors aren't abusive or even rude to her--all they want is for her to heal their friend, a wounded blacksmith. The outlaws respect her greatly--except for one, their Chief, the notorious "Painted Man". The fierce, tattooed leader is a mystery Liadan must unravel--who he is, where he comes from, why he cannot abide darkness, and why he despises women so much that he can't stand being in her presence. Guided by the Otherworld people known as Fair Folk, Liadan walks a long and twisted path that leads her all over the land of Erin, discovering shocking things about her family, her friends...and the Painted Man. She must separate truth from lies, and decide whether to follow the path the Fair Folk set for her, or make her own way, though her own path may lead to extreme danger, broken alliances and friendships, and a broken heart.

=== Child of the Prophecy ===
Child of the Prophecy is the story of Fainne (Faun-ya), the daughter of Niamh (Nee-av). She is raised on the coast in Kerry by her single father, a powerful sorcerer. Fainne has little time for normal childhood things, prevented by her father's lengthy lessons of practicing the craft; sorcery. What precious little time she does have, she spends with her only friend, Darragh (Darr-ah), a boy belonging to a family of travelers. As Fainne grows into a young woman, her heavy workload increases, leaving no time for anything but the practice of the craft. Her father has taught her well, but her education is not yet complete. Her grandmother, a renowned sorceress capable of awesome powers and terrifying cruelty, comes to finish her training--and to tell her the reason behind all these years of preparation. Fainne is to complete a task for her grandmother--go to her mother's home, to meet her family for the first time...and to kill her own cousin, destroying the family's chances of winning an impending battle and fulfilling an ancient prophecy. She can't refuse, or her evil grandmother will punish her by hurting those she loves--her father, her young cousins, and her most precious treasure of all; her childhood friend, Darragh. Fainne must walk a fine line between good and evil, and face an impossible choice: dance to the witch's tune in order to protect her loved ones, or defy her sorceress grandmother for the greater good of her family, the people of Sevenwaters, and ultimately all of Erin.

=== Heir to Sevenwaters ===
"Heir to Sevenwaters" is the story of Clodagh (Klo-da), daughter of Sean and Aisling (Ash-ling), an obedient, selfless, and caring young woman. Clodagh shares a psychic mind-link with her twin sister Deirdre (Dair-dra), just as her father, Sean, shares with his twin Liadan. Though Clodagh isn't gifted as a seer or with magical abilities, she is perceptive to the Otherworldly beings that share the forest around her home, sometimes seeing things others can't. Clodagh's twin is being wed to a young nobleman, and Sevenwaters is filled with visitors, including the handsome Aidan, and his best friend and foster-brother, Cathal (Ka-hall), both young men in her cousin's retinue. Aidan is the picture of a perfect future-husband; charming and caring, while Cathal is rude, insulting, and embarrassing to Aidan. Clodagh has other worries, however, with the prospect of parting with her twin sister, and her mother's unexpected and potentially dangerous pregnancy. While taking charge of the household in her mother's place, Clodagh discovers more and more about the two young guardsmen—and it turns out that neither one is as he seems. Trouble is brewing among the local nobility, and Clodagh struggles to make sense of some mysterious warnings she receives. After the birth of baby Finbar, everyone is relieved to see that mother and child are both healthy and safe—until the newborn disappears suddenly while Clodagh is babysitting him. It happened in a split second, and in the baby's place is a pile of sticks, leaves, branches, and pebbles, crudely shaped in a baby's form—until Clodagh sees that the twig-and-leaves child is much more than it appears to be. The problem is, only Clodagh can see it for what it is—a changeling. To make matters worse, her father doesn't know whom to trust anymore, as the mysterious Cathal also disappeared at the same time as the baby. While the Sevenwaters men-at-arms search fruitlessly for baby Finbar, Clodagh knows it's a waste of time. A changeling can only mean one thing: it must be brought back to its home in the Otherworld, where she must strike a bargain with the Fair Folk to retrieve her baby brother. On her way, she runs straight into Cathal. Clodagh has no other options; she must take whatever help she can get—and deep down, she can tell that Cathal is not behind the kidnapping. Together they embark on a perilous journey, compelled by powerful forces—and even more powerful feelings.

=== Seer of Sevenwaters ===
Seer of Sevenwaters follows Sibeal's (pronounced Shi-bail) last summer on Inis Eala before she makes her final vows to become a druid and live in the forest of Sevenwaters in quiet meditation and solitude. What was meant to be a peaceful visit is quickly transformed as a shipwreck on a nearby reef sends three survivors to the island, including a mysterious amnesiac who Sibeal finds herself caring for. Their lives change when, together, they must embark upon a journey of self-discovery that will lead them far away and closer to each other.

=== Twixt Firelight and Water ===
A short story about Lady Oonagh's other son, Conri. For assisting in the rescue of Ciaran, he is turned into a raven until a woman of Sevenwaters agrees to marry him. After decades as Ciaran's familiar, his story wins the sympathy of Padriac's daughter, the fierce Aisha who is visiting for the first time from norseland Xixón. Ciaran performs the wedding, the curse is broken, and Conri returns to human form.

=== Flame of Sevenwaters ===
Flame follows Maeve, one of Lord Sean's daughters, on her return to Sevenwaters after ten years away at Harrowfield. Burned in a horrible accident as a child, Maeve is reluctant to return to the place of so many difficult memories and expectations. Yet upon her return, she finds herself in the middle of a strange struggle, the heart of which lies in the Otherworld. And only Maeve and her little brother Finbar have the ability to save their family, their clan, and perhaps all of Erin.

== Awards and honors ==
In 2000, Booklist included Daughter of the Forest on their year-end list of the best "Adult Books for Young Adults". The following year, they included it on their list of the year's top ten science fiction novels. The Young Adult Library Services Association also included Daughter of the Forest on their 2001 Best Books for Young Adults list.

In 2002, Booklist included Child of the Prophecy on their list of the year's top ten sci-fi and fantasy novels.

Awards for The Sevenwaters series
Title	Year	Award	Result	Ref.
Daughter of the Forest	2000	Aurealis Award for Fantasy Novel	Finalist	
Daughter of the Forest	2001	Alex Award	Winner	
Son of the Shadows	2001	Aurealis Award for Fantasy Novel	Winner	
Child of the Prophecy	2002	Aurealis Award for Fantasy Novel	Finalist	
