= Child of the Prophecy =

2001 novel by Juliet Marillier

- Paperback USA edition (Tor Books)
- Author: Juliet Marillier
- Series: Sevenwaters trilogy
- Genre: Historical Fantasy
- Publisher: Pan Macmillan
- Publication date: 1 August 2001, Paperback Edition, Australia
- Pages: 608
- ISBN: 978-0-7329-1093-8
- OCLC: 57329849
- Preceded by: Son of the Shadows
- Followed by: Heir to Sevenwaters

Child of the Prophecy is an historical fantasy novel by Juliet Marillier and the third book in the Sevenwaters Trilogy first published in 2001. Book Three steps slightly out of the tradition of Sevenwaters, with the young heroine Fainne being raised far from the homestead, in Kerry. Fainne is the daughter of Niamh and Ciaran, and is a dangerous combination of four races.

== Explanation of the novel's title ==
The sacred islands were taken by the Britains, and that the prophecy states that it will take a child who is neither of Britain nor or Erin but at the same time both, who is marked by the raven to take the sacred island back. Without "the Child of the Prophecy" the quest to regain the sacred islands will fail.

== Plot summary ==
Fainne is a sorcerer's daughter growing up in Kerry. Her mother, Niamh (Son of the Shadows) had drowned in the sea when Fainne was quite young, her father Ciarán, the son of Lady Oonagh (Daughter of the Forest) and a former druid (Son of the Shadows), teaches her the art of sorcery during her childhood, including the Glamour, the art of changing one's appearance at will. Fainne becomes close friends with Darragh, one of the tinkers who returns every summer. When Fainne is old enough, Ciarán decides that she must go to her mother's family at Sevenwaters to learn of her heritage, after her grandmother teaches her some new lessons. Fainne's grandmother arrives just after Ciarán departs and teaches Fainne with very strict and harsh methods how to use her gift to make people bend to her will and do her bidding, especially men.

After her grandmother's training is over, Fainne is told that she must go to Sevenwaters and thwart the long scheme of the Túatha Dé Danann to get back the sacred islands. The alliance that is preparing to take back the islands forcibly from Edwin of Northwoods is led by her cousin Johnny, the child of Liadan and Bran (Son of the Shadows) and child of the prophecy (that a child of Briton and Erin and of neither, marked by the raven, would save the sacred islands). To force Fainne to do this, her grandmother threatens her father with sickness and a slow death. Her grandmother gives her a charm to wear to protect her from the people of Sevenwaters; in reality, this charm allows her grandmother to see Fainne and to partially control her thoughts.

During the trip to Sevenwaters, Fainne and Darragh's easy friendship is broken when they quarrel over the use of her sorcerer's gift. Darragh gives up the travelling life and accepts a job taking care of horses. Fainne arrives at Sevenwaters and gradually becomes accepted as part of the household. After she settles in, she is goaded by her grandmother to start a fire which disfigures her young cousin Maeve and kills a visiting druid. While Maeve is slowly recovering, Fainne and the other young girl cousins are invited to visit Eamonn at Glencarnagh, where Eamonn shows great interest in her. Disappointed at Fainne's continued lack of progress, her grandmother threatens harm to all those Fainne loves, including Darragh, who visits one day. Fainne then bargains with Eamonn for marriage in exchange for information that will allow Eamonn to kill his longtime enemy the Painted Man, Johnny's father.

Fainne returns to Sevenwaters and Eamonn's formal proposal of marriage is refused by her uncle Sean. She turns into a moth to spy on a secret meeting at Sevenwaters. Johnny and his mother Liadan decide to take Fainne to the island of Inis Eala where they are preparing for the final battle for the sacred islands. Darragh forces his way into the band of warriors by showing his prowess as a swimmer. Given hope by an unexpected encounter with her uncle Finbar (Daughter of the Forest), Fainne transforms into a dove and follows the warriors to the final battle for the islands. Johnny and Bran lead a small secret mission to sink the Britons' ships, during which Eamonn's spy mistakenly attacks Johnny instead of Bran and is killed. An injured Johnny is captured by the men of Northwoods. Johnny's men believe him dead but go on with the attack under Bran's leadership. Fainne transforms back to human and awaits the right moment to act, coached by the Old Ones.

During the battle, the overrun Britons use Johnny as hostage to force the alliance to retreat. Johnny challenges a Northwoods champion to single combat, with the terms being complete control of the islands. During their fight, Fainne comes out of hiding, pushed by her grandmother to kill Johnny at this pivotal moment. Eamonn saves Fainne from death but dies from the Briton arrow himself. At the last moment, Fainne defies her grandmother with the help of her uncles Finbar and Conor the archdruid and is punished by the sight of Darragh being pushed off a cliff. Ciarán then appears to protect his daughter from his mother, who boasts of killing his wife Niamh. Ciarán is almost killed by her himself, but Finbar throws himself in the path of Lady Oonagh's death bolt and dies in his stead.

Thwarted, Lady Oonagh reveals the second part of the prophecy, that once the child of the prophecy has retaken the islands that person must climb up to The Needle and remain in solitude watching over the islands. Johnny, a warrior and leader, is not suited to this task; all believe the prophecy has failed. Then Fainne volunteers, as she meets all the criteria of the prophecy: she is both of Erin and Britain and has a scar given her by her father's familiar Fiacha, a raven. Her childhood learning the lore in silence and solitude has prepared her for this task. The Túatha Dé Danann reveal themselves to take Fainne away. The Lady Oonagh still threatens to kill Fainne and is finally turned into a mouse by Fainne and is quickly eaten by a passing bird.

The Fair Folk then tell everyone that they all must leave the islands that night or else they die, as the prophecy has been fulfilled and they must begin their lives anew. Fainne is brought by the Fair Folk to the Needle where she and her descendants must remain performing the old rituals, shrouded in the mists hidden from the world until man again remembers his bond with the earth. How will she have descendants she asks? It seems that the Fair Folk and the old ones saved Darragh and turned him into a selkie and Fainne sings him back into a man. Darragh tells Fainne that he is willing to give up his original life to be with her. They are left alone on the island. The island is then shrouded in the mists only to be seen briefly by the occasional seaman until that time in the far future when men again remember. There is an excerpt in the end that gives the readers a peek into Fainne's life. She has two children, a boy and a girl.

== Characters in Child of the Prophecy ==
- Fainne: Daughter of Ciarán and Niamh
- Ciarán: A young druid, son of Lord Colum and the Lady Oonagh, he falls in love with Niamh.
- Darragh: Fainne's best friend and love interest. He does not like to see Fainne use her sorcerers' gift.
- Lady Oonagh: Fainne's Grandmother a powerful and dangerous sorceress.
- Sean: Lord of Sevenwaters, Fainne's uncle.
- Aisling: Wife to Sean, Lady of Sevenwaters, and mother to Murrin, Maeve, Deirdre, Clodagh, Sibeal, and Eilis.
- Conor: Leader of the Druids, Ciarán's half brother.
- Liadan: Sister to Sean, Lady of Harrowfield, married to Bran ('the Chief'), and mother to Johnny, Fintan, Cormack, and Coll.
- Bran (a.k.a. 'The Chief', and 'the Painted Man'): Husband of Liadan, Lord of Harrowfield, and father to Johnny, Fintan, Cormack, and Coll.
- Johnny: Liadan's son, believed to be 'child of the prophecy'. Heir to Sevenwaters.
- Coll & Cormack: Liadan's other sons.
- Fintan: Liadan's son who is the heir to Harrowfield
- Muirrin: Sean and Aisling's oldest daughter, she is the healer at Sevenwaters like her Aunt Liadan.
- Maeve: She is injured in the fire started by Fainne
- Deirdre, Clodagh, Sibeal, Eilis: Sean and Aisling's other daughters.
- Eamonn: Lord of Sídhe Dubh, tries to seduce Fainne, eventually agrees to marry her in exchange for information on Bran.
- Dan Walker: Darragh's father, a Tinker. He delivers messages for Ciarán.
- Peg: Darragh's mother
- Roisin: Darragh's sister
- Snake: In charge of the art of warfare on the island of Inis Eala.
- Gull: The healer on Inis Eala
- Biddy: Gull's wife, she was Evan's sweetheart, the smith who died in Son of the Shadows
- Sam and Clem: Biddy's sons from a previous marriage, they live on Inis Eala.
- Corentin, Gareth, Godric, Mikka, Snake, Waerfrith, Rat, Sigurd, Mikka and Wold: Warriors on the island of Inis Eala.
- Breanna, the fletcher and Annie, the cook: young woman who lived on Inis Eala
- Finbar: Brother of Conor, the man with a swan's wing from Daughter of the Forest, he lives in a cave on the far side of Inis Eala.
- Edwin of Northwoods: Leader of the Britons holding the sacred islands.
- Fiacha: Ciarán's raven who follows Fainne.

== Literary significance and reception ==
Publishers Weekly said that "Marillier's strong voice and rolling, lucid prose seem appropriate for a 10th-century Irish tale, and her command of a fantasy story's elements make this an excellent conclusion to a fine trilogy."

The Library Journal said that Marillier "captures the feel of myth in this Celtic-laced saga that belongs in most fantasy collections".

== Allusions and references ==
=== Characters of Irish mythology mentioned ===
Spellings shown below are the one used in the novel

- Túatha Dé Danann: The "Fair Folk"
- Fir Bolg: The "Bag Men" they inhabited Ireland before the Túatha Dé Danann
- Brighid
- Clurichaun: Dan Walker tells a tale about a Clurichaun during the trip to Sevenwaters.
- Morrígan
- Fomhóire: The "Old Ones"
- Dadga: "The Good God"
- Tír na nÓg: The isle of dreams
- Cú Chulainn:
- Fionn mac Cumhaill:
- Manannán mac Lir: god of the Sea
- Selkie: Mythological creature that can transform from seal to human.

=== Celtic seasonal festivals mentioned ===
- Imbolc: 1 February
- Beltaine: 1 May
- Lugnasad: 1 August
- Samhain: 1 November
- Meán Geimhridh: winter solstice
- Meán Fómhair: autumn equinox

=== Allusions to actual geography ===
- Kerry: Fainne and her father Ciarán live here during Fainne's childhood.
- Tirconnell: Where Fainne's mother went to live as part of her forced marriage.
- Skellig rocks: Darragh show Fainne these rocks as the last sight of the Kerry cost on their journey to Sevenwaters.
- Ulster: Sevenwaters is within Ulster.
- Northumbria: The area in Briton where Harrowfield is located.
- Armorica: Where Corentin was born
- Isle of Man: Some think that the sacred islands are either north or south of the Isle of Man.

== Awards and nominations ==
Child of the Prophecy was a finalist for the 2002 Aurealis Awards for Fantasy Novel

== Publication history ==
- 2001, Australia, Pan Macmillan ISBN 978-0-7329-1093-8, Pub Date 1 August 2001, Trade Paperback
- 2002, Australia, Pan Macmillan ISBN 978-0-330-36354-9, Pub Date 1 June 2002, Paperback
- 2002, USA, Tor Books, ISBN 978-0-312-84881-1 Pub date 20 March 2002, Hardcover
- 2003, USA, Tor Books, ISBN 978-0-7653-4501-1 Pub Date 16 June 2003, Paperback
- 2002, UK, HarperCollins, ISBN 978-0-00-224738-2, Pub Date 2 April 2002, Paperback
