= Broichan =

Name of a wizard

Broichan is the name of a wizard who lived in 6th century Pictland and served King Bridei I. Adomnán of Iona wrote about him and his relation to St Columba during the saint's travels in Pictland.

== Description ==
The wizard is mentioned by Adomnán as being close to the king and that he also possessed an Irish slave-girl who had possibly been a war captive. In Adomnán's account, when Columba met Broichan and Bridei at the king's fortress near the River Ness, Columba demanded that the girl be released but the wizard refused. Columba then went down to the river and told his companions that an angel at that moment had struck Broichan, and his cup had fallen from his hand and he was deathly ill. Moments later two messengers from King Bridei came to inform Columba of these events as they happened, and Columba gave his own messengers a pebble from the River Ness and told them that if Broichan agreed to release the slave-girl, then they were instructed to place the pebble in a cup of water and make him drink it, but if Broichan refused, then he would die immediately. They then went back to the fortress and Broichan agreed to release the girl, and so they placed the pebble in a cup of water, and it miraculously floated on top. Broichan drank from it and was healed. The pebble was then kept at the fortress and used whenever someone needed healing for a disease, but it could not be found when the time for someone to die had really come, and so on the day when King Bridei was about to die, they couldn't find the pebble anywhere.

Adomnán also recorded a story about Broichan in the same vicinity of Pictland. In the second story, Columba and his companions were getting into a boat on Loch Ness and preparing to leave, but Broichan used his magic to summon the weather against Columba and so the winds went against him. Columba then called on Christ's name and ordered the sails to be raised, and miraculously the boat then went off at a high speed directly into the oncoming wind that was blowing against them.
