= Juliet Marillier =

New Zealand fiction writer

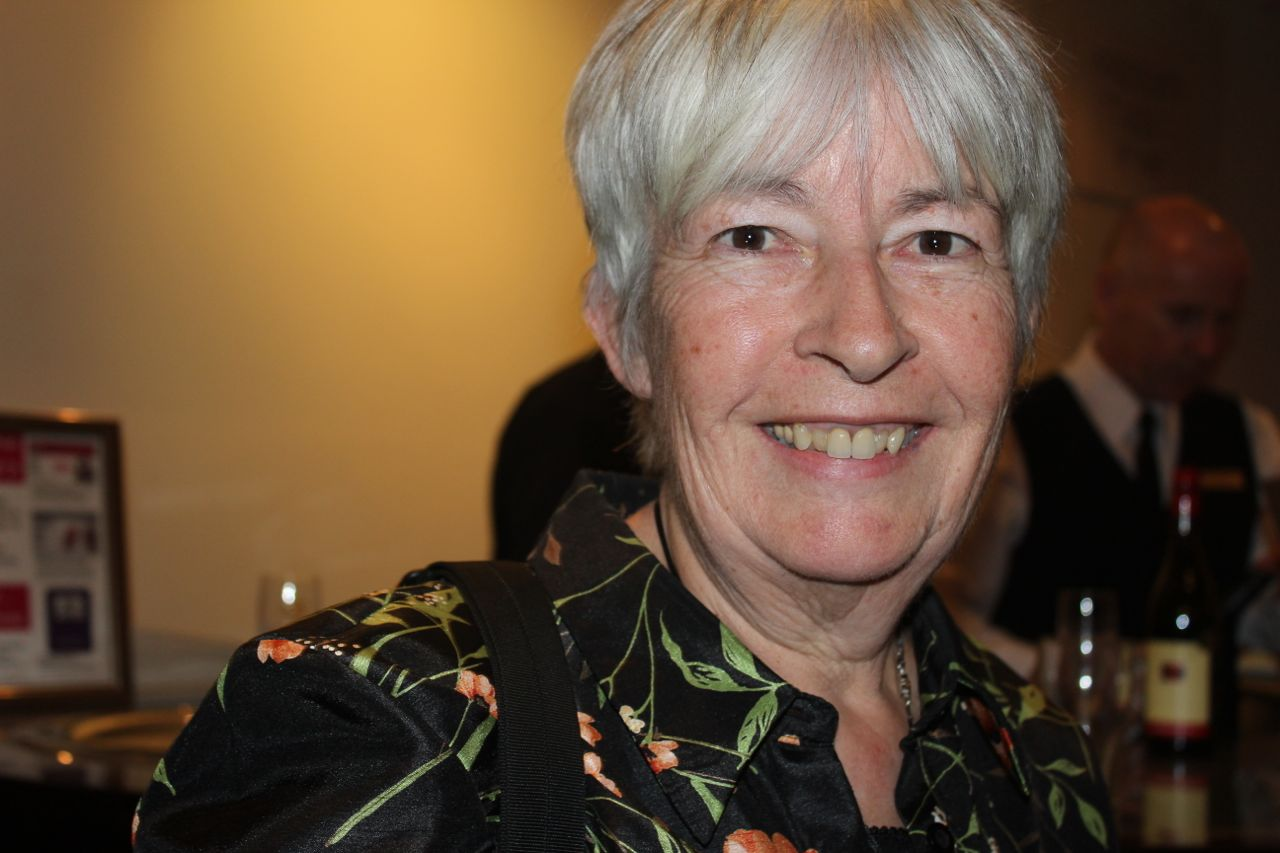
- Marillier in 2013
- Born: Juliet Marillier; 1948 (age 77–78); Dunedin, New Zealand
- Education: University of Otago
- Occupation: Author
- Children: 4
- Writing career
- Genre: Historical fantasy
- Notable awards: 2008 Sir Julius Vogel Award

Juliet Marillier (born in 1948) is a New Zealand-born writer of speculative fiction, predominantly historical fantasy.

She has been nominated for 26 Aurealis Awards, resulting in 6 wins. Additionally, she has won four Sir Julius Vogel Awards. She received the World Fantasy Award—Life Achievement in 2025.

== Biography ==
Marillier attended University of Otago. She graduated with a Bachelor of Arts in languages and a Bachelor of Music (honours). She then taught music at high school and university levels and has been a choral conductor and opera singer.

Marillier is on the Literary Advisory Committee for the Katharine Susannah Prichard Writers' Centre and is a contributor to the writing blog Writer Unboxed. She belongs to the Order of Bards, Ovates and Druids.

== Personal life ==
She has lived in the Swan Valley, Western Australia (since 2014).

== Awards ==
Year	Title	Award	Category	Ref.
2000	Son of the Shadows	Aurealis Award	Fantasy Novel	
2001	Daughter of the Forest	Alex Awards	—	
2005	Blade of Fortriu	Aurealis Award	Fantasy Novel	
2006	Wildwood Dancing	Aurealis Award	Fantasy Novel	
2008	Cybele's Secret	Sir Julius Vogel Award	Young Adult Novel	
2009	Wildwood Dancing	Beehive Book Award	Young Adult Fiction	
2010	Daughter of the Forest	Prix Imaginales	Novel in Translation	
2010	Seer of Sevenwaters	Tin Duck Awards	Professional Long Written Work	
2013	"By Bone-Light" (Prickle Moon)	Aurealis Award	Young Adult Short Story	
2013	Shadowfell	Tin Duck Awards	Speculative Fiction by Western Australian writers	
2014	"By Bone-Light" (Prickle Moon)	Sir Julius Vogel Awards	Short Story	
2014	Prickle Moon	Tin Duck Awards	Professional Long Written Work	
2014	Raven Flight	Sir Julius Vogel Awards	Youth Novel	
2015	The Caller	Sir Julius Vogel Awards	Youth Novel	
2015	Dreamer's Pool	Aurealis Award	Fantasy Novel	
2016	Tower of Thorns	Tin Duck Awards	Professional Long Written Work	
2018	Blackthorn & Grim	Aurealis Award	Sara Douglass Book Series Award	
2019	Beautiful	Tin Duck Awards	Professional Short Written Work	
2025	—	World Fantasy Award	Life Achievement	

== Bibliography ==
=== The Sevenwaters Series ===
1. Daughter of the Forest (1999)
2. Son of the Shadows (2000)
3. Child of the Prophecy (2001)
4. Heir to Sevenwaters (2008)
5. Seer of Sevenwaters (2010)
6. Flame of Sevenwaters (2012)

=== Saga of the Light Isles ===
1. Wolfskin (2002)
2. Foxmask (2003)

=== The Bridei Chronicles ===
1. The Dark Mirror (2004)
2. Blade of Fortriu (2005)
3. The Well of Shades (2006)

=== The Whistling Tor series ===
1. Heart's Blood (2009)

=== The Shadowfell series ===
1. Shadowfell (2012)
2. Raven Flight (2013)
3. The Caller (2014)

=== Blackthorn and Grim ===
1. Dreamer's Pool (2014)
2. Tower of Thorns (2015)
3. Den of Wolves (2016)

=== Warrior Bards ===
1. The Harp of Kings (September, 2019)
2. A Dance with Fate (September, 2020)
3. A Song of Flight (September, 2021)

=== The Heartwood Duology ===
1. The Amber Owl (2025)
2. The Hidden Way (2026)

=== Novels for young adults ===
- Wildwood Dancing (2006)
- Cybele's Secret (2007)

=== Short story collections ===
- Prickle Moon (2013), 16 stories.
- Mother Thorn and Other Tales of Courage and Kindness (2021), 4 stories.

=== Short stories ===
Short stories in Prickle Moon.

- "Prickle Moon"
- "Otherling"
- "Let down your hair"
- "Poppy seeds"
- "In Coed Celyddon"
- "Juggling silver"
- "'Twixt Firelight and Water (A Tale of Sevenwaters)"
- "Gift of hope"
- "Letters from Robert"
- "Jack's day"
- "Far horizons"
- "Tough Love 3001"
- "Wraith, level one"
- "Back and beyond"
- "The angel of death"
- "By bone-light"
- "Beautiful"

Dates shown are for first Australian publication.
