= The Sword of God (novelette) =

Short story by Russell Blackford

- Short story by Russell Blackford
- Country: Australia
- Language: English
- Genre: Fantasy

Publication
- Published in: Dream Weavers
- Publication type: Anthology
- Publisher: Penguin Books
- Media type: Print (Paperback)
- Publication date: 1996

"The Sword of God" is a 1996 fantasy novelette by Australian writer Russell Blackford.

== Background ==
"The Sword of God" was first published in Australia in 1996 in Paul Collins' Dream Weavers by Penguin Books. It was published alongside 12 other stories by the authors Tony Shillitoe, Melinda Ross, Sean McMullen, Jane Routley, Cadmus Evans, Shannah Jay, Howard Goldsmith, Paul Collins, Isobelle Carmody, Beverley MacDonald, Ian Hayward Robinson and Keith Taylor. In 1997 it was republished in The Years' Best Australian Science Fiction and Fantasy 1996 edited by Jonathan Strahan, Jeremy G. Byrne. In 2003 Wakefield Press and Aphelion Publications published it in Forever Shores, edited by Margaret Winch, Peter McNamara, and in 2004 it was released again in The Best Australian Science Fiction: A Fifty Year Collection, edited by Rob Gerrand and published by Black Inc. "The Sword of God" won the 1996 Aurealis Award for best fantasy short story and the 1997 Ditmar Award for best Australian short fiction.
