= Dream Weavers (anthology) =

1996 fantasy anthology by Paul Collins

- First edition cover.
- Author: Paul Collins (editor)
- Cover artist: Elizabeth Kyle
- Language: English
- Genre: Fantasy
- Publisher: Penguin Books
- Publication date: 1996
- Publication place: Australia
- Media type: Print (Paperback)
- Pages: 283 (first edition)
- ISBN: 978-0-14-026208-7

Dream Weavers is a 1996 fantasy anthology edited by Paul Collins.

== Background ==
Dream Weavers was first published in September 1996 by Penguin Books in trade paperback format. It was a short-list nominee for the 1997 Ditmar Award for best long fiction but lost to Lucy Sussex' The Scarlet Rider. Dream Weavers features 13 stories from 13 authors. One of the stories, "The Sword of God" by Russell Blackford won both the 1996 Aurealis Award for best fantasy short story and the 1997 Ditmar Award for best Australian short fiction. Another story "At the Edge of the Sea" by Keith Taylor was a short-list nominee for the 1996 Aurealis Award for best young-adult short story but lost to Isobelle Carmody's "Green Monkey Dreams".

== Contents ==
- Introduction by Paul Collins
- "The Innkeeper", novelette by Tony Shillitoe
- "The Scribe of a Hundred Lies", short story by Melinda Ross
- "Lucky Jonglar", short story by Sean McMullen
- "The Empty Quarter", short story by Jane Routley
- "The Weakest Link", short story by Sean McMullen (as Roger Wilcox)
- "Sunchosen", short story by Cadmus Evans
- "Walk the Wildwoods", novelette by Shannah Jay
- "Dream Weaver", short story by Howard Goldsmith and Paul Collins
- "The Keystone", novelette by Isobelle Carmody
- "Princess Melodia and the White Catherine", novelette by Beverley MacDonald
- "The Sword of God", novelette by Russell Blackford
- "The Crypt of Fleeting Hope", novelette by Ian Hayward Robinson
- "At the Edge of the Sea", novelette by Keith Taylor
