= The Quentaris Chronicles =

The Quentaris Chronicles is a shared universe series of fantasy books initially published by Lothian Books, but now published by Ford Street Press. The books in the series are written by various Australian authors including Isobelle Carmody, Pamela Freeman and John Heffernan. Though they are written by different authors and usually star new characters, they are all set in the magical city of Quentaris. There are also several recurring characters that play minor roles e.g. Stanas the water magician. The series editors are Paul Collins and Michael Pryor.

== List of books ==
No	Title	Author	Publication year
1	Beneath Quentaris	Michael Pryor	2003
2	Slaves of Quentaris	Paul Collins	2003
3	The Perfect Princess	Jenny Pausacker	2003
4	The Revognase	Lucy Sussex	2003
5	Swords of Quentaris	Paul Collins	2003
6	Quentaris in Flames	Michael Pryor	2003
7	Dragonlords of Quentaris	Paul Collins	2004
8	Stones of Quentaris	Michael Pryor	2004
9	Angel Fever	Isobelle Carmody	2004
10	The Ancient Hero	Sean McMullen	2004
11	Treasure Hunters of Quentaris	Margo Lanagan	2004
12	The Mind Master	John Heffernan	2004
13	The Plague of Quentaris	Gary Crew	2005
14	Rifts Through Quentaris	Karen Brooks	2005
15	Princess of Shadows	Paul Collins	2005
16	The Cat Dreamer	Isobelle Carmody	2005
17	The Murderers' Apprentice	Pamela Freeman	2005
18	Nightmare in Quentaris	Michael Pryor	2005
19	Stolen Children of Quentaris	Gary Crew	2006
20	Stars of Quentaris	Michael Pryor	2006
21	The Forgotten Prince	Paul Collins	2006
22	Pirates of Quentaris	Sherryl Clark	2006
23	The Prisoner of Quentaris	Anna Ciddor	2006
24	The Skyflower	Justin D'Ath	2006
25	Vampires of Quentaris	Paul Collins	2008
26	Battle for Quentaris	Michael Pryor	2008
27	The Spell of Undoing	Paul Collins	2008
28	The Equen Queen	Alyssa Brugman	2008
29	The Gimlet Eye	James Roy	2009
