= Green Monkey Dreams =

- Short story by Isobelle Carmody
- Country: Australia
- Language: English
- Genre: Fantasy

Publication
- Published in: Green Monkey Dreams
- Publication type: Collection
- Publisher: Viking Press
- Media type: Print (Paperback)
- Publication date: 1996

"Green Monkey Dreams" is a 1996 fantasy short story by Australian writer Isobelle Carmody.

"Green Monkey Dreams" was first published in 1996 as part of a collection of Isobelle Carmody's short stories entitled Green Monkey Dreams by Penguin Books under their Viking Press imprint. It was featured alongside 13 other stories by Carmody. "Green Monkey Dreams" won the 1996 Aurealis Award for best young-adult short story and was a short-list nominee for the 1996 Aurealis Award for best fantasy short story but lost to Russell Blackford's "The Sword of God".
