= Michael Pryor =

Australian writer of speculative fiction (born 1957)

- Born: 23 April 1957; Swan Hill, Victoria
- Writing career
- Genre: Speculative fiction
- Website: michaelpryor.com.au

Michael Pryor (born 23 April 1957) is an Australian writer of speculative fiction.

== Biography ==
Pryor was born in Swan Hill, Victoria and currently lives in Melbourne with his wife and two daughters. His first work to be published was the short story "Talent" in 1990, which was published in Aurealis No. 1. He received his first nomination for his work in 1993 when the short story "It's All in the Way You Look at It" was nominated for the Ditmar Award for best short fiction, however it lost to Greg Egan's "Closer". In 1996 Pryor released his first novel, The Mask of Caliban, which was a finalist for the 1997 Aurealis Award for best young-adult novel. In 2003 he started writing novels in The Quentaris Chronicles, a shared universe with several other authors. In 2015, Pryor switched gears to writing books for children. He first published Leo da Vinci Vs. The Ice-Cream Domination League in 2015, then three other books for children up to the present, with Gap Year in Ghost Town being nominated for the Aurealis Award for best fantasy novel in 2017. Pryor has been nominated for an Aurealis Award a total of nine occasions with the most recent being in 2018 for his short story "First Casualty".

== Bibliography ==
=== Novels ===
Doorways Trilogy

- The House of Many Rooms (1998)
- The Book of Plans (1998)
- The Unmaker (1999)

The Quentaris Chronicles

- Beneath Quentaris (2003)
- Quentaris in Flames (2003)
- Stones of Quentaris (2004)
- Nightmare in Quentaris (2005)
- Stars of Quentaris (2006)
- Battle for Quentaris (2008)

The Laws of Magic

- Blaze of Glory (2006)
- Heart of Gold (2007)
- Word of Honour (2008)
- Time of Trial (2009)
- Moment of Truth (2010)
- Hour of Need (2011)

The Chronicles of Krangor

- The Lost Castle (2007)
- The Missing Kin (2008)
- The King in Reserve (2009)

The Extraordinaires

- The Extinction Gambit (2011)
- The Subterranean Stratagem (2013)

Leo Da Vinci

- Leo da Vinci Vs. The Ice-Cream Domination League (2015)
- Leo Da Vinci Vs. The Furniture Overlord (2016)

Ghost Town

- Gap Year in Ghost Town (2017)
- Graveyard Shift in Ghost Town (2019)

Other novels

- The Mask of Caliban (1996)
- Talent (1997)
- Cosmic Cook (2002)
- Blackout (2000)
- Bruno Trask & The Dark Lady's Jewel (2002)
- 10 Futures (2012)
- Machine Wars (2014)

=== Short fiction ===
- "Talent" (1990) in Aurealis No. 1 (ed. Stephen Higgins, Dirk Strasser)
- "Softly They Go Feral in the Night" (1991) in Aurealis No. 4 (ed. Stephen Higgins, Dirk Strasser)
- "Long Live the King" (1991) in Aurealis No. 6 (ed. Stephen Higgins, Dirk Strasser)
- "It's All in the Way You Look at It" (1992) in Aurealis No. 10 (ed. Stephen Higgins, Dirk Strasser)
- "Shadows on the Heart" (1993) in Aurealis No. 12 (ed. Stephen Higgins, Dirk Strasser)
- "Home Free" (1994) in The Patternmaker : Nine Science Fiction Stories (ed. Lucy Sussex)
- "Hunter of Darkness, Hunter of Light" (1994) in Aurealis No. 15 (ed. Stephen Higgins, Dirk Strasser)
- "Time to Burn" (1996) in Aurealis No. 18 (ed. Stephen Higgins, Dirk Strasser)
- "Australian Visions" (1998) in Aurealis #20/21 (ed. Stephen Higgins, Dirk Strasser)
- "Room for Improvement" (1999) in Gadgets and Gizmos (ed. Meredith Costain, Paul Collins)
- "Sewercide" (2000) in Aurealis #25/26 (ed. Dirk Strasser, Stephen Higgins)
- "EvilCo" (2001) in Aurealis #27/28 (ed. Dirk Strasser, Stephen Higgins)
- "Waste" (2003) in Forever Shores (ed. Margaret Winch, Peter McNamara)

=== Essays ===
- The Science Fiction Hall of Fame: Otto Greenbach (1990) in Aurealis No. 1 (ed. Stephen Higgins, Dirk Strasser)
- The Science Fiction Hall of Fame: E. Freeport Rickenbacker (1990) in Aurealis No. 2 (ed. Stephen Higgins, Dirk Strasser)
- The Science Fiction Hall of Fame: Wanda Stambridge (1991) in Aurealis No. 4 (ed. Stephen Higgins, Dirk Strasser)
- The Science Fiction Hall of Fame: Bamber Fortescue (1991) in Aurealis No. 5 (ed. Stephen Higgins, Dirk Strasser)
- The Science Fiction Hall of Fame: Cosmo Tucker (1991) in Aurealis No. 6 (ed. Stephen Higgins, Dirk Strasser)
- The Science Fiction Hall of Fame: G. K. "Doc" Tolliday, D.D. (1992) in Aurealis No. 7 (ed. Stephen Higgins, Dirk Strasser)
- The Science Fiction Hall of Fame: Anna Michailovna Tikhonova (1992) in Aurealis No. 8 (ed. Stephen Higgins, Dirk Strasser)
- The Science Fiction Hall of Fame: Gaston La Rue (1992) in Aurealis No. 9 (ed. Stephen Higgins, Dirk Strasser)
- The Science Fiction Hall of Fame: Malcolm Corkindale (1992) in Aurealis No. 10 (ed. Stephen Higgins, Dirk Strasser)
- Classic SF (2001) in Aurealis #27/28 (ed. Dirk Strasser, Stephen Higgins)
- The Art of Successful Collaboration (2004 with Paul Collins) in Aurealis #33–35, (ed. Keith Stevenson)

Source: ISFDB.com, michaelpryor.com.au

== Nominations ==
Aurealis Awards

- Best fantasy novel
  - 2006: Nomination: Blaze of Glory
  - 2007: Nomination: Heart of Gold
  - 2017: Nomination: Gap Year in Ghost Town
- Best horror short story
  - 2000: Nomination: "Sewercide"
- Best science fiction short story
  - 1998: Nomination: "Australian Visions"
- Best young-adult novel
  - 1996: Nomination: The Mask of Caliban
  - 2007: Nomination: Heart of Gold
- Sara Douglass Book Series
  - 2016: Nomination: The Laws of Magic
- Best young-adult short story
  - 2018: Nomination: "First Casualty"

Ditmar Awards

- Best short fiction
  - 1993: Nomination: "It's All in the Way You Look At It"
