= The Miocene Arrow =

2000 novel by Sean McMullen

- First edition cover
- Author: Sean McMullen
- Language: English
- Series: Greatwinter
- Genre: Science fiction
- Publication date: 2000
- ISBN: 0-7653-4455-6
- OCLC: 59352683
- Preceded by: Souls in the Great Machine
- Followed by: Eyes of the Calculor

The Miocene Arrow is a post-apocalyptic novel by Australian writer Sean McMullen. It is the middle book of the Greatwinter trilogy.

== Plot summary ==
In isolated pockets of what used to be America, humans fight stylized duels in small, biodiesel-powered airplanes. In a land where chivalry and honor are everything, what happens when rebels from Australia, enamored of the amazing technology held by the Americans, hatch a plot to bring some of it back to their homes?

== Reception ==
Publishers Weekly that "the tale features labyrinthine politics, a large cast of engaging, thorny and occasionally rather cartoonish characters, and many well depicted scenes of aerial warfare. The authors inventive use of several oddball technologies is particularly noteworthy, and veteran SF readers may well be reminded of L. Sprague de Camp."

== Sources ==
- Cassada, Jackie (1 August 2000). "The Miocene Arrow (Book Review)". Library Journal. 125 (13). p168. ISSN 0363-0277.
- Johnson, Roberta (August 2000). "Adult Books: FICTION". Booklist. 96 (22): 2126. ISSN 0006-7385.
