= Morgan Bell =

Australian writer

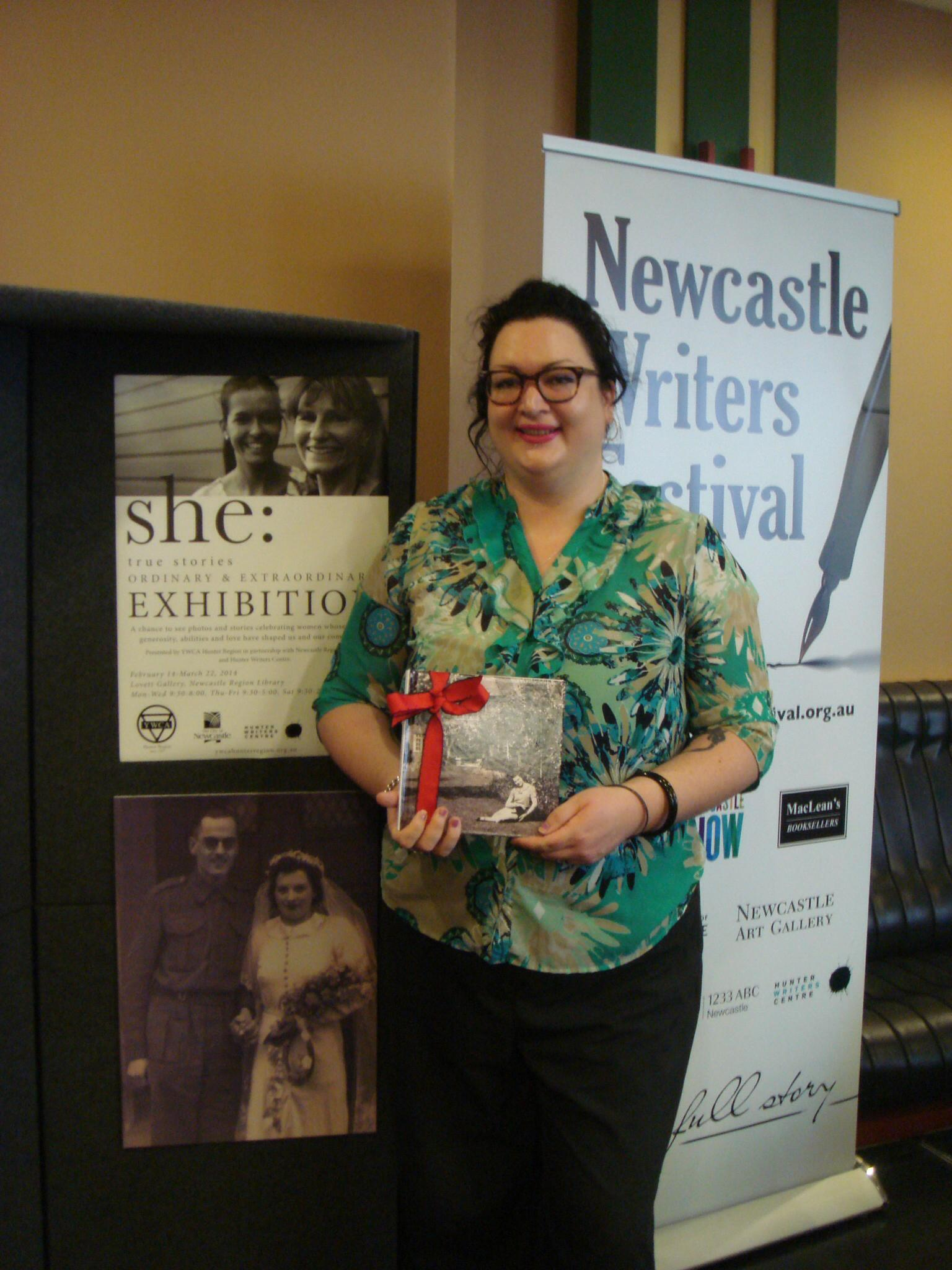
- Morgan Bell in 2014
- Born: 1981 (age 44–45); Melbourne, Victoria, Australia
- Occupations: Author, civil engineer
- Writing career
- Period: Postmodern literature, minimalism
- Genres: Literary fiction, speculative fiction
- Subject: Mental health
- Website: sniggerlessboundulations.webs.com

Morgan Bell is an Australian writer of short stories. Bell is the author of short story collection Sniggerless Boundulations (2014), and Laissez Faire (2017). She is a story contributor to local anthologies and community projects, and in 2014 was short-listed for the Hunter Writers Centre Travel Writing Prize for her anti-travel story Don't Pay the Ferryman. In 2016 Bell edited Sproutlings: A Compendium of Little Fictions, a speculative fiction anthology, for Invisible Elephant Press. In 2017 her Short Story Workshop taught creative writing at Tomaree Community Centre and she taught a Writing For Pleasure course at Port Stephens U3A.

== Early life and education ==
Morgan Bell was born in Melbourne, Victoria, the eldest of two daughters to Glenys Joy and Stephen Paul Bell. Her mother is from New Zealand, and her father is from England. She grew up in Newcastle, New South Wales, and attended high school in Newcastle.

== Career ==
Bell is a member of Hunter Writers Centre in Newcastle, New South Wales, speaking at the 2014 Newcastle Writers' Festival on a panel celebrating the contributions of women to the enrichment of everyday life. Bell read her short story "Midnight Daisy" at the YWCA Newcastle She: True Stories session at the festival. Bell also recorded an audio version of Midnight Daisy for Newcastle's ABC1223 radio station and received a high commendation and prize at the exhibition launch at Lovett Gallery, Newcastle Regional Library.

Bell revealed in an interview that the eponymous Daisy from Midnight Daisy was a 93-year-old British ex-pat who was a close family friend. Bell interviewed Daisy, a process she describes as her proudest achievement, about a month before Daisy undertook a final trip to her birthplace in rural northern England. Daisy died on her UK holiday in October 2013 and was laid to rest at her mother grave. The story contrasts the harsh living conditions of Daisy's mother in Shropshire in the 1920s and 1930s with the worldly experiences of Daisy herself, including World War II, a mixed-race marriage, and relocating to Australia.

The transcript I prepared of Daisy's childhood stories was originally intended to be read at a school assembly of the primary school she attended in the 1930s in England, to give the current students an idea of how much daily life had changed in the last century. It was instead used in the UK funeral service and Australian memorial service. I crafted elements of the six-page transcript into a 500-word short story for a competition celebrating inspirational women.

— Morgan Bell, Writers on Wednesdays

=== Sniggerless Boundulations ===
Bell published her debut collection of short stories, entitled Sniggerless Boundulations, on 21 January 2014. The collection is experimental in length, form and scope, mostly generated from flash fiction prompts and short story competitions. The collection contains fifteen stories but runs only 68 pages long, as many are vignettes and micro-fictions. The promotional Twitter tagline was Sniggerless Boundulations: the horrors of life in fifteen slices.

The collection is largely about domestic tensions, with a few speculative fiction pieces. The overarching themes are fear, anxiety, time, aging, and jealousy.

About the title, Bell has said it is a nonsense phrase that came to her in a dream but "Linguistically it translates to a calculated series of steps forward. I like the riddle quality and the weightlessness of the phrase." and "Semantically the intention is to evoke a progression of steps away from creeping paranoia."

Bell has made the following statements about the flash fiction collection's likeness to the concept albums of her teen years in the 1990s:

- "Read some other single-author collections to see how the stories are arranged. I find a short story collection to be a bit like the old "mixed tape" or the modern iPod playlist, there is an art in the order. If your stories have an evolving theme they can be like a concept album."
- "I like Strings & Ribbons for its poetry and reprieve. Its placement in the collection is like a lighter musical interlude on a heavy rock album."
- "I write with so much tension, sometimes it is difficult to sustain over a long time, I often need to construct deliberate ebbs and flows to add some reprieve to all the suspense."

=== Influences ===
Bell learnt about the free indirect speech method of writing from James Wood's How Fiction Works.

Australian short-story collections that have inspired her are Margo Lanagan's Black Juice, Cate Kennedy's Dark Roots, of which she has said "For perfecting the craft of the short form Australian author Cate Kennedy does it best in her collection Dark Roots, every story sticks with you and haunts you, she is the master," Tim Winton's The Turning (stories), and Angela Meyer's Captives. She has said that the minimalism and dirty realism of short-stories by Tobias Wolff and Raymond Carver have struck a chord with her.

Bell has repeatedly cited Angela Carter as an influence. She has said the appeal of Angela Carter's works is the juxtaposition of oddities, and has singled out The Passion of New Eve as a favourite saying "it’s a real trip and a gender bender. You will question everything you know about relations between men and women, and the imagery will stay with you forever."

In interviews Bell has cited the following authors as influences: Ursula K. Le Guin, Aldous Huxley, Virginia Woolf, Oscar Wilde, Jane Austen, DBC Pierre, James Frey, Deborah Levy, Lauren Beukes, Julienne van Loon, Jim Crace; and the following books as influences: Stephen King’s The Eyes of the Dragon, Amy Tan’s The Joy Luck Club, Virginia Woolf’s Mrs Dalloway, Dathan Auerbach’s Penpal.

Her recent reading has included Sharp Objects and Gone Girl by Gillian Flynn, and The Good House by Ann Leary, which she called an "extraordinary debut novel" and the "perfect delicate balance of intrigue and poetic justice". Bell has said she likes "suspense, some domestic drama, and strong deeply flawed characters".

Bell has said a good last line or paragraph is her favourite part of a story. Citing the last lines of Aldous Huxley’s Brave New World as a favourite: "Just under the crown of the arch dangled a pair of feet. Slowly, very slowly, like two unhurried compass needles, the feet turned towards the right; north, north-east, east, south-east, south, south-south-west; then paused, and, after a few seconds, turned as unhurriedly back towards the left. South-south-west, south, south-east, east...."

In 2015an audiobook version of Sniggerless Boundulations, spoken by voice artist Jon Severity, was made available on Audible.

=== Laissez Faire ===
Bell published her second short story collection on 8 September 2017. Bell announced it was three years in the making. The collection contains fifteen stories plus a "bonus track" (poem) and runs only 48 pages long. Feminist writer Ruby Hamad posted an except from the story The Permanence of Ceramics pertaining to May–December marriage, referring to it as "micro-fiction", "ultra short stories", and remarking "It's amazing what creative minds can do with so little words." The promotional tagline is Laissez Faire: Awkward. Weird. Excruciating.

=== Hunter anthologies ===
Bell contributed a short story to Novascapes, the 2014 Hunter Speculative Fiction Anthology, alongside award-winning authors such as Margo Lanagan, Kirstyn McDermott, and Russell Blackford. Bell's story, The Switch, is based on Germanic folklore. The Anthology was published 30 September 2014 by Invisible Elephant Press. The cover art was designed by local illustrator Tallulah Cunningham.

Novascapes was launched at the 2015 Newcastle Writers Festival at a session hosted by Russell Blackford at 10am-11am Sunday 22 March 2015 at Newcastle City Hall. Editor Cassandra Page (C.E. Page) gave an introduction and then readings of excerpts were performed by the following contributing authors: Janeen Webb, Sheree Christoffersen, Danuta Electra Raine, and Samantha Fisher. The line-up represented a cross-section of genres and author experience.

The anthology was mentioned as a prime example of successful Australian speculative fiction crowdfunding collections on Tor.com's introduction post to their new Australian-focussed Aurora Australis - Series blog. Blogger Alexandra Pierce said "Australian press has recently gone in for crowdfunding: like Twelfth Planet Press’ Kaleidoscope anthology, Fablecroft's Cranky Ladies of History, and Novascapes (stories from authors of the Hunter region)."

Bell received an acknowledgement from the editor in the paperback edition regarding promoting the crowdfunding campaign on Twitter and other social media. It stated "I want to thank Morgan Bell for her efforts in creating a last minute social media storm that helped the Pozible campaign reach its goal."

Hunter Anthologies put a call out for submissions for Novascapes Volume 2 between 1 October 2014 and 31 January 2015. Successful entries are to be notified by 28 February 2015. The anthology will be published by Invisible Elephant Press.

Bell has stated on her website that she submitted two stories for consideration: A Deer In The Shunting Yard, and The Lost Art of Transportation.

Novascapes 2 was launched at the 2016 Newcastle Writers Festival at a 3pm-4pm session on Sunday 3 April 2016 at Newcastle City Hall hosted by editor Cassandra Page (C.E. Page) with a cover illustrator Q&A with Tallulah Cunningham and readings from Jan Dean, Janeen Webb, Magdalena Ball, and Leonie Rogers.

Bell committed to editing Hunter Anthologies' first themed collection, Sproutlings, a 2015 short story project based on wicked plants.

== Personal life ==
Bell has been outspoken about her experiences with anxiety and depression, stating that the intention of many of her stories is to replicate the "sense of that horrifying panic or despair" of mental illness. Bell has stated that her story Garsdale is an allegory for struggling with depression. In interviews Bell has characterised herself as neurotic, paranoid, and self-doubting stating that she is prone to exhausting herself with over-thinking. She has a fear of amusement park rides, a fear of heights, and a fear of pregnancy.

By occupation Bell manages road traffic, working as a traffic engineer and technical writer for local government. Bell has described herself as an idealist (from watching too much Star Trek: The Next Generation and Star Trek: Voyager as a kid), a gossip and a people-watcher. She is also open about her asexuality, being interviewed by the Hack program on Triple J radio on 19 July 2011, and her atheism, and is described as self-professed feminist and nerd.

Bell's hobbies include mosaic, digital art, pub trivia, drag queens, and goldfish.
