= Tigers of the Sea =

1974 book by Robert E. Howard

- Cover of the first edition
- Author: Robert E. Howard
- Illustrator: Tim Kirk
- Cover artist: Tim Kirk
- Language: English
- Series: Cormac Mac Art
- Genre: Fantasy
- Publisher: Donald M. Grant, Publisher, Inc.
- Publication date: 1974
- Publication place: United States
- Media type: Print (hardback)
- Pages: 212 pp
- OCLC: 1372467

Tigers of the Sea is a collection of fantasy short stories by Robert E. Howard about the pirate Cormac Mac Art, a Gael who joins a band of Danish Vikings during the reign of King Arthur.

Howard was inspired by Cormac Mac Art, a famous High King of Ireland who possibly existed circa 200 AD, but takes considerable creative liberties with the source material. Except for one, the stories are pure historical fiction, dealing with struggles between various groups of humans. The exception is the fantasy-horror tale "The Temple of Abomination", in which Cormac Mac Art and his Viking fellows defeat the last of the monstrous Serpent Men, whom King Kull fought in the much earlier Howardian cycle.

Tigers of the Sea was first published in 1974 by Donald M. Grant, Publisher, Inc. in an edition of 3,400 copies. The volume was edited by Richard L. Tierney.

== Contents ==
- Introduction, by Richard L. Tierney
- "Tigers of the Sea" (by Howard, completed by Tierney)
- "Swords of the Northern Sea"
- "The Night of the Wolf"
- "The Temple of Abomination" (by Howard, completed by Tierney)

== Editions ==
The stories of Cormac Mac Art were also printed by Baen Books in 1995 as Robert E. Howard Library Vol. I: Cormac Mac Art.. This edition included the same stories from Tigers of the Sea with an additional new story, "The Land Towards Sunset", published by author David Drake

== Plot summary ==
Originally, Cormac Mac Art (nicknamed an Cluiun - "The Wolf") was a member of the Irish Reivers - bold pirates who range far among the ruins of the Roman Empire, reaching Spain and on occasion even Egypt, though their ships are less sound than those of the Scandinavian Vikings. Usually, Reivers and Vikings are on bad terms with each other - being competitors for the same loot.

However, at one point, Cormac Mac Art (for unspecified reasons) became an outlaw and had to leave Ireland in a hurry. Soon, he found refuge and a new home among the Danish Vikings led by Wulfhere the Skull-Splitter. He became Wulfhere's right hand man, the two of them complementing each other and working harmoniously together.

The giant Wulfhere is a bellicose and formidable fighter, quite deserving of his nickname. He is impetuous, easily roused, and on bad terms with most of the other Viking leaders - though not overtly cruel and capable at times of surprising compassion. Cormac Mac Art, though a formidable swordsman in his own right when in need, is a more subtle man: well-informed on the affairs of the numerous kingdoms, tribes, and factions inhabiting the turbulent British Islands and beyond. He's also a fluent speaker of many languages, a competent spy able to infiltrate enemy strongholds, and the originator of complicated or intricate plots. Cormac has many enemies, Irish as well as Scandinavian, who would dearly love to put an end to his career - but he manages to elude them, again and again.

Wulfhere appreciates Cormac's advice and mostly follows it, while Cormac accepts Wulfhere's leadership of the band and has no intention of challenging it. Together, they go through many dangerous adventures and emerge from various near-fatal traps.

Like most Irish people of his time, Cormac is a Pagan, a staunch believer of the Druidic religion, and his opinion towards Christianity is far from positive - though in "The Temple of Abomination" he (like his Danish fellows) comes to respect the courage and dedication of a Christian priest whom they save from the monstrous snake-man.

== Andrew Offutt novels ==
Andrew Offutt continued Cormac Mac Art's adventures beyond where Howard left off, writing six such novels, including two in collaboration with Keith Taylor).

- Sword of the Gael (1975)
- The Undying Wizard (1976)
- The Sign of the Moonbow (1977)
- The Mists of Doom (1977)
- When Death Birds Fly (1980, with Keith Taylor)
- The Tower of Death (1982, with Keith Taylor)

== Reception ==
The volume received a number of reviews:

- Review by Stuart David Schiff in Whispers, November 1974
- Review by L. Sprague de Camp in Amra, vol. 2, no. 63, April 1975
- Review by W. N. MacPherson in The Science Fiction Review (Monthly), July 1975
- Review by Stuart David Schiff in Whispers, June 1975
- Review by B. A. Fredstrom in Luna Monthly, no. 65, Fall 1976
- Review by Arthur Byron Cover in Delap's F & SF Review, January 1977
- Review by Thomas M. Egan in Science Fiction & Fantasy Book Review, January 1980; reprinted in Science Fiction & Fantasy Book Review: The Complete Series, Vol. I, No. 1–Vol. II, No. 13, January 1979–February 1980 (2009)
- Review by Tomasz Kołodziejczak in Fenix, no. 2, 1990 (in Polish). p. 107-109
