= Eyes of the Calculor =

2001 novel by Sean McMullen

- First edition cover
- Author: Sean McMullen
- Language: English
- Series: Greatwinter
- Genre: Science fiction
- Publication date: 2001
- Preceded by: Souls in the Great Machine, The Miocene Arrow

Eyes of the Calculor is a post-apocalyptic novel by Australian writer Sean McMullen, published in 2001. It is the third part of the Greatwinter trilogy.

== Plot summary ==
Mirrorsun, which orbits Earth and prevents electrical machines from functioning, has been defunct for some time. However, when it comes back to life with a vengeance, the new Highliber must reform the Calculor, a large computer whose components are human beings. At the same time, Americans are working with an underground group to bring their airplanes and weapons to Australia. Can the Highliber and the Overmayor of Rochester, the capital of Australia, stop the American technology from destroying their way of life?

== Literary significance and reception ==
Jackie Cassady in her review for the Library Journal said that "McMullen's sf epic examines the implications of low technology and religious idealism set against a world in the throes of transformation."
