= Convenors' Award for Excellence =

The Convenors' Award for Excellence is one of the Aurealis Awards presented annually by the Australia-based Chimaera Publications and WASFF to published works in order to "recognise the achievements of Australian science fiction, fantasy, horror writers". The Convenors' Award, awarded at the discretion of the convenors, recognises "a particular achievement in speculative fiction or related areas" that cannot otherwise be judged for the Aurealis Awards, usually because it does not fit into any of the Aurealis categories. Works nominated for the Convenor's Award for Excellence can be non-fiction, artwork, film, television, electronic or multimedia work. The work can be speculative fiction, or a speculative fiction related work "which brings credit or attention to the speculative fiction genres".

Between 2004 and 2012 the award was known as the Peter McNamara Award for Excellence, in honour of the publisher, editor and original convenor of the awards, who died in 2004. It was renamed in 2012 to avoid confusion with the Peter McNamara Achievement Award, presented at the Ditmar Awards ceremony at the Australian National Science Fiction Convention.

To qualify, a work must have been first published by an Australian citizen or permanent resident between 1 January and 31 December of the corresponding year; the presentation ceremony is held the following year.

== Winners ==
In the following table, the years correspond to the year of the work's eligibility; the ceremonies are always held the following year. Each year links to the corresponding "year in literature" article.

| Year | Winner(s) | Work (when a single work was cited) | Ref |
|---|---|---|---|
| 1998 | Shaun Tan | artwork in The Rabbits (Lothian) | |
| 1999 | Terry Dowling | Antique Futures (MP Books) | |
| 2000 | Paul Collins and Meredith Costain | editing Spinouts: Bronze (Pearson Education) | |
| 2000 | Shaun Tan | The Lost Thing (Lothian) | |
| 2001 | Emily Rodda and Marc McBride | The Deltora Quest series (Scholastic) | |
| 2001 | Emily Rodda and Marc McBride | The Deltora Book of Monsters (Scholastic) | |
| 2001 | Peter McNamara | | |
| 2002 | Robbie Matthews | | |
| 2003 | Nick Stathopoulos | | |
| 2004 | Cat Sparks | | |
| 2005 | Grant Stone | | |
| 2006 | Bill Congreve | | |
| 2007 | Terry Dowling | Ryneomonn (Coeur de Lion) | |
| 2008 | Jack Dann | | |
| 2009 | Justin Ackroyd | Slow Glass Books (bookshop) | |
| 2010 | Helen Merrick | | |
| 2011 | Alisa Krasnostein, Alex Pierce, Tansy Rayner Roberts, and producer Andrew Finch | Galactic Suburbia (podcast) | |
| 2012 | Kate Eltham | | |
| 2013 | Jonathan Strahan | | |
| 2014 | David Ashton, Petra Elliott, Ben McKenzie, John Richards and Lee Zachariah | Night Terrace (audio series) | |
| 2015 | Alexandra Pierce and Alisa Krasnostein | Letters to Tiptree (Twelfth Planet Press) | |
| 2016 | Kate Forsyth | The Rebirth of Rapunzel: A Mythic Biography of the Maiden in the Tower | |
| 2017 | Tansy Rayner Roberts | The Fictional Mother | |
| 2018 | Cat Sparks | The 21st Century Catastrophe: Hyper-capitalism and Severe Climate Change in Science Fiction | |
| 2018 | Kim Wilkins, Lisa Fletcher, and Beth Driscoll | Genre Worlds: Australian Popular Fiction in the 21st Century | |
| 2019 | Jason Nahrung | Watermarks: Science Fiction, Mitigation and the Mosaic Novel Structure in Australian Climate Fiction | |
| 2020 | Kirstyn McDermott | Never Afters: Female Friendship and Collaboration in Contemporary Re-visioned Fairy Tales by Women | |
| 2021 | Iain McIntyre and Andrew Nette, eds. | Dangerous Visions and New Worlds: Radical Science Fiction, 1950 to 1985 | |
| 2022 | Maria Lewis | The Phantom Never Dies (Nova Entertainment) | |
