= Bard (novel) =

1981 novel by Keith Taylor

Bard is a 1981 novel written by Keith Taylor.

== Plot summary ==
Bard is a novel in which Felimid mac Fal, a bard of Erin, becomes a fugitive in England, where he must rely on his wit and charm rather than brute force to survive. He navigates danger primarily through clever speech, occasionally using the magic of his harp to instill deep sorrow or lull listeners into sleep.

== Reception ==
John T. Sapienza Jr. reviewed Bard for Different Worlds magazine and stated that "Bard is an exciting adventure novel of ancient times. It is also a tale of magics of many different kinds and sources, and full of ideas to enliven and enrich your role-gaming."

== Reviews ==
- Review by Charles Platt (1982) in The Patchin Review, Number Three
- Review by Lynn F. Williams (1982) in Science Fiction & Fantasy Book Review, #3, April 1982
- Review by Paul McGuire (1982) in Science Fiction Review, Fall 1982
- Review by Peter Tremayne (1989) in Paperback Inferno, #81
