= Sean McMullen =

Australian science fiction and fantasy author (born 1948)

Sean Christopher McMullen
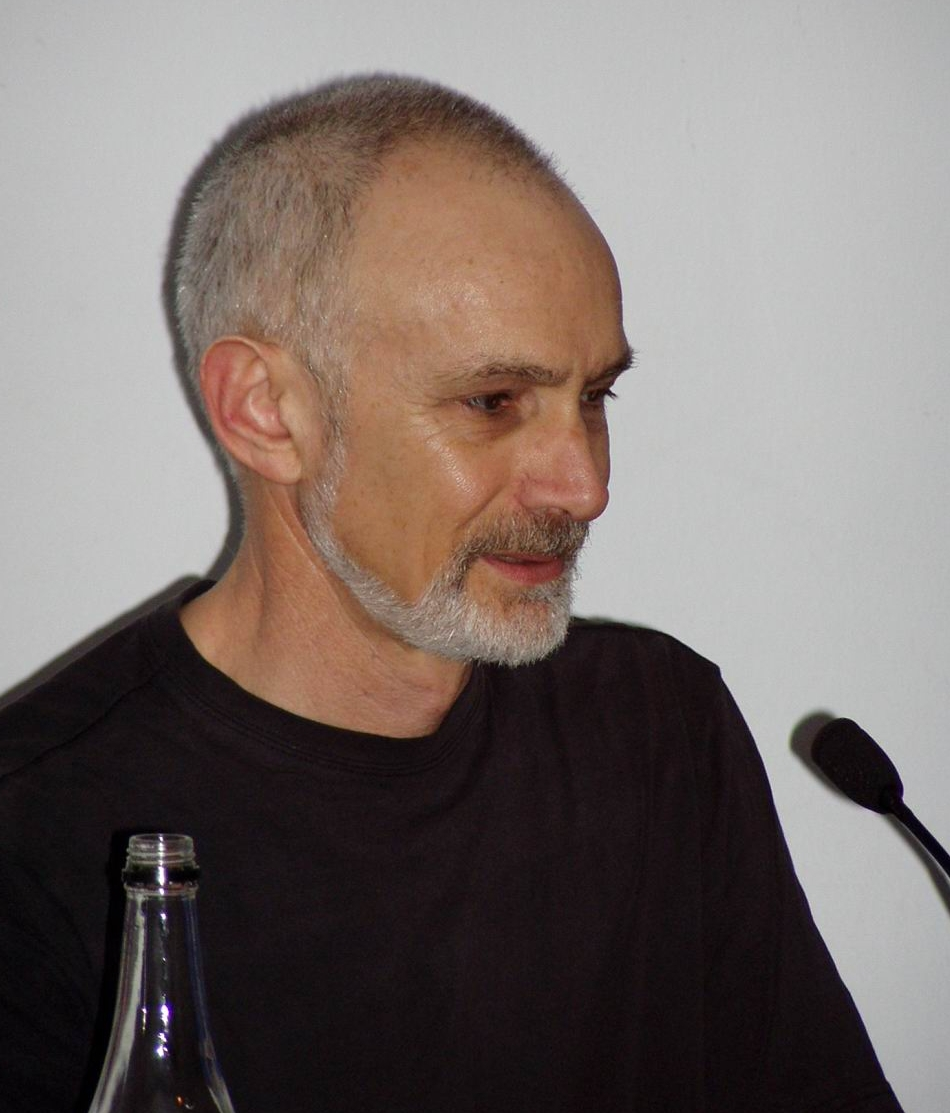
- McMullen at the 63rd World Science Fiction Convention in Glasgow, August 2005
- Born: 21 December 1948 (age 77); Victoria, Australia
- Occupations: Writer, critic, musician
- Writing career
- Pen name: Roger Wilcox
- Genres: Science fiction and fantasy
- Website: www.seanmcmullen.net.au

Sean Christopher McMullen (born 21 December 1948 in Sale, Victoria) is an Australian science fiction and fantasy author, considered one of the country's leading writers in the genre. He has published more than 100 stories and 26 books. His novelette "Eight Miles" was a finalist for the Hugo Award, and his story "Voice of Steel" was nominated for the British Science Fiction Association Award. He has won the Analog Reader's Award three times, most recently for "Wheel of Echoes" in 2020.

== Biography ==
McMullen grew up in Gippsland, Victoria. He earned a degree in physics and history from Melbourne University in 1974, a postgraduate degree in library and information science, and a PhD in medieval literature from the same university. He worked as a musician through the 1970s, singing and playing guitar, and spent two years with the Victorian State Opera. He spent 33 years in scientific computing at the Bureau of Meteorology before leaving to write full-time. He holds a fourth-dan black belt in karate and is a master instructor at the Melbourne University Karate Club.

He is the father of Catherine Smyth-McMullen, an Australian screenwriter. Her debut feature The Other Lamb premiered at the Toronto International Film Festival in 2019 and was featured on the Black List. She wrote Episode 11 of Season 1 of The Sandman ("Dream of a Thousand Cats / Calliope"), for which she received a 2023 Australian Writers' Guild Award nomination, and two episodes of The Killings at Parrish Station. She has won the John Hinde Award for Science Fiction and the International Emmy Ustinov Award for Television Writing.

== Writing career ==
McMullen's first professional sale was "The Pharaoh's Airship," published in Omega Science Digest in 1986; he had won the short story competition at the 1985 World Science Fiction Convention the year before. His first novel appeared in Australia as two volumes, Voices in the Light (1994) and Mirrorsun Rising (1995), the latter winning the Australian SF Award (Ditmar). He revised and combined the two for US publication as Souls in the Great Machine (1999), the first book of the Greatwinter series, followed by The Miocene Arrow (2000) and Eyes of the Calculor (2001), a mix of the generally opposed genres of steampunk and cyberpunk. His first internationally published novel was The Centurion's Empire (1998), which follows its central character from the Roman Empire to the near future through repeated periods of suspended animation.

His next series, the Moonworlds saga (Voyage of the Shadowmoon, 2002; Glass Dragons, 2004; Voidfarer, 2006; The Time Engine, 2008), saw McMullen move away from science fiction and into fantasy. In the 2000s, as well as continuing his short fiction, he began writing science fiction and fantasy for young readers, including The Ancient Hero (2004, part of the Quentaris Chronicles), Before the Storm (2007) and Changing Yesterday (2011), and, with Paul Collins, the six-book Warlock's Child series (2015–16). His story "Voice of Steel" (2001) was nominated for the British Science Fiction Association Award in 2003 and won Poland's Nova Fantastyka Reader's Award.

McMullen has also developed several of his works for screen and stage. After meeting producers Dean Toovey and Mal Cumpson of Inventive Entertainment, he received a Film Victoria grant to develop the screenplay Icekeeper, and several of his other stories and novels were later optioned for screen development. In 2013 his story "Hard Cases" was adapted into a short film directed by Terry Shepherd, in which McMullen made a cameo appearance. In 2010 he adapted and directed a revival of Norma Hemming's 1958 play The Matriarchy of Renok, staged at that year's World Science Fiction Convention.

He continued to publish short fiction through the 2010s, including "Technarion" (2013), which won the Interzone Readers' Poll, and "Exceptional Forces" (2016), a finalist for the Asimov's Readers' Award. In 2020 and 2021 he won the Analog Reader's Award and was nominated for the Sidewise Award for Alternate History for "Wheel of Echoes."

His short story "The Precedent" (2010), published in The Magazine of Fantasy & Science Fiction, became the basis for his 2022 novel Generation Nemesis (Wizard's Tower Press), a story of generational reckoning over climate change. It was included in Aurealis magazine's reviewers' picks for best speculative fiction of 2023. The fourth Greatwinter novel, Keys to the Dragon Machine, was published by Hybrid Publishers in 2025.

== Critical acclaim and awards ==
McMullen has won the Aurealis Award three times, for Best Science Fiction Novel (The Centurion's Empire, 1999; The Miocene Arrow, 2001) and Best Science Fiction Short Story ("Walk to the Full Moon," 2003). He has also won the Australian SF Award (Ditmar) eight times, mostly for short fiction and criticism, including five William Atheling Jr Awards. His novelette "Eight Miles" was a finalist for the Hugo Award in 2011, and he has been nominated twice for the Sidewise Award for Alternate History and once for the British Science Fiction Association Award. He has won the Analog Reader's Award three times and placed first in the 2014 Interzone Readers' Poll.

Kirkus Reviews gave Voyage of the Shadowmoon a starred review, writing that McMullen "writes like Roger Zelazny at the peak of his powers." Publishers Weekly also starred its sequel, Glass Dragons. Reviewing the collection Dreams of the Technarion in Interzone (#275, May/June 2018), critic Ian Sales called McMullen a "cannier sf writer than Philip K. Dick ever was." The Encyclopedia of Science Fiction credits McMullen's "chaste chill control of narrative devices" with giving "what might seem to be no more than enjoyable tales of adventure a sense of solid significance."

His short fiction has been reviewed extensively, and is often featured in 'Year's Best' Anthologies. Writing for Locus Online, Lois Tilton called "The Precedent" the best story in an issue of The Magazine of Fantasy & Science Fiction that was "full of good ones," and praised it for avoiding "the trap of absurdity." A year later, Tilton named "Enigma" one of the year's best stories published in Analog. Reviewing Ghosts of Engines Past for Escape Pod, Josh Roseman named "Voice of Steel," "Svyatagor" and "Steamgothic" as highlights of the collection.

Reviewing his novel Generation Nemesis, The New York Review of Science Fiction wrote that it is "deftly" critical of "the authoritarian excesses of environmentalism," and BestSF called it "as bleakly intense a take on climate change and its consequences as you'll find." Aurealis magazine called it "a grim but eerily poignant and relevant look at a dark future in a world destroyed by environmental collapse." Lightspeed and Nightmare editor John Joseph Adams featured the novel in his newsletter, rating it 9/10 and calling it "a really great read."

== Academic and non-fiction work ==
McMullen was assistant editor, alongside fellow Australian SF writer Steven Paulsen, under general editor Paul Collins, of The MUP Encyclopaedia of Australian Science Fiction & Fantasy (Melbourne University Press, 1998). With Russell Blackford and Van Ikin, he wrote Strange Constellations: A History of Australian Science Fiction (Greenwood Press, 1999), which won a William Atheling Jr Award and is still cited as a useful reference by the Encyclopedia of Science Fiction. With Steven Paulsen, he also wrote the first histories of Australian fantasy and Australian horror, each of which also won a William Atheling Jr Award. His article "Shot in Australia," in the anthology Projections, is described on his own website as the first history of Australian science fiction for the screen.

With Simon Litten, he wrote Fantastical Worlds and Futures at the World's Edge: A History of New Zealand Science Fiction and Fantasy (2020), produced for that year's Worldcon in New Zealand. It was a finalist for Best Professional Production/Publication at the 2021 Sir Julius Vogel Awards. His essay "Outpost of Wonder," a 37,000-word history of Australian science fiction from 1832 to 2017, is included in his 2018 collection Dreams of the Technarion.

== Awards and nominations ==
Year	Award	Category	Work	Result
1991	Australian SF Award (Ditmar)	Australian Short Fiction	"While the Gate Is Open"	Won
1992	Australian SF Award (Ditmar)	Short Fiction	"Alone in His Chariot"	Won
1992	William Atheling Jr Award for Criticism	—	"Going Commercial and Becoming Professional"	Won
1993	William Atheling Jr Award for Criticism	—	"Australian SF Art Turns 50"	Won
1996	Australian SF Award (Ditmar)	Long Fiction	Mirrorsun Rising	Won
1996	William Atheling Jr Award for Criticism	—	"The Hunt for Australian Horror Fiction" (with Bill Congreve and Steven Paulsen)	Won
1998	William Atheling Jr Award for Criticism	—	"Australia: Australian Contemporary Fantasy" (with Steven Paulsen)	Won
1999	Aurealis Award	Best Science Fiction Novel	The Centurion's Empire	Won
2000	William Atheling Jr Award for Criticism	—	Strange Constellations (with Van Ikin and Russell Blackford)	Won (tie)
2001	Aurealis Award	Best Science Fiction Novel	The Miocene Arrow	Won
2002	Analog Readers' Award	Novelette	"Tower of Wings"	Won
2003	Aurealis Award	Best Science Fiction Short Story	"Walk to the Full Moon"	Won
2003	Nova Fantastyka Reader's Award	Best Foreign Story	"Voice of Steel"	Won
2003	British Science Fiction Association Award	Short Fiction	"Voice of Steel"	Nominated
2011	Hugo Award	Novelette	"Eight Miles"	Nominated (runner-up)
2013	Analog Readers' Award	Novelette	"Ninety Thousand Horses"	Won
2013	Sidewise Award for Alternate History	Short Form	"Steamgothic"	Nominated
2014	Interzone Readers' Poll	—	"Technarion"	Won (tied for first)
2014	WSFA Small Press Award	—	"Acts of Chivalry"	Nominated
2021	Analog Readers' Award	Short Story	"Wheel of Echoes"	Won
2021	Sidewise Award for Alternate History	Short Form	"Wheel of Echoes"	Nominated
2021	Sir Julius Vogel Award	Best Professional Production/Publication	Fantastical Worlds and Futures at the World's Edge (with Simon Litten)	Nominated

== Bibliography ==
=== Novels ===
- Voices in the Light (Aphelion Publications, 1994)
- Mirrorsun Rising (Aphelion Publications, 1995)
- The Centurion's Empire (Tor, 1998)
- The Ancient Hero (Lothian Books, 2004, part of the Quentaris Chronicles)
- Before the Storm (Hybrid Publishers/Ford Street Publishing, 2007)
- Changing Yesterday (Hybrid Publishers/Ford Street Publishing, 2011)
- Generation Nemesis (Wizard's Tower Press, 2022)
- This Spells Trouble (Ford Street Publishing, 2023, with Paul Collins)

Greatwinter series

- Souls in the Great Machine (Tor, 1999, a rewritten version of Voices in the Light and Mirrorsun Rising)
- The Miocene Arrow (Tor, 2000)
- Eyes of the Calculor (Tor, 2001)
- Keys to the Dragon Machine (Hybrid Publishers, 2025)

The Moonworlds Saga series

- Voyage of the Shadowmoon (Tor, 2002)
- Glass Dragons (Tor, 2004)
- Voidfarer (Tor, 2006)
- The Time Engine (Tor, 2008)

Warlock's Child series (with Paul Collins)

- The Burning Sea (Hybrid Publishers/Ford Street Publishing, 2015)
- Dragonfall Mountain (Hybrid Publishers/Ford Street Publishing, 2015)
- The Iron Claw (Hybrid Publishers/Ford Street Publishing, 2016)
- Trial by Dragons (Hybrid Publishers/Ford Street Publishing, 2016)
- Voyage to Morticas (Hybrid Publishers/Ford Street Publishing, 2016)
- The Guardians (Hybrid Publishers/Ford Street Publishing, 2016)

=== Short fiction ===
Collections

- Call to the Edge (Aphelion Publications, 1992)
- Walking to the Moon (Wildside Press, 2007)
- Ghosts of Engines Past (ReAnimus Press, 2013)
- Colours of the Soul (ReAnimus Press, 2013)
- Dreams of the Technarion (ReAnimus Press, 2018)

Stories

Title	Year	First published	Reprinted/collected	Notes
"The Pharaoh's Airship"	1986	Omega Science Digest, July/August 1986		McMullen's first professional sale
"At the Focus"	1986/1990	Eidolon, Spring 1990 (ed. Jeremy G. Byrne)		With Paul Collins
"The Deciad"	1986	Call to the Edge		
"The Colors of the Masters"	1988	The Magazine of Fantasy & Science Fiction, March 1988 (ed. Edward L. Ferman)	Glass Reptile Breakout (ed. Van Ikin, 1990); Mortal Fire: Best Australian SF (Hodder & Stoughton, 1993)	Nominee, Australian SF Award, 1989
"While the Gate Is Open"	1990	The Magazine of Fantasy & Science Fiction, February 1990 (ed. Edward L. Ferman)	Call to the Edge	Winner, Australian SF Award, 1991
"A Rich Fantasy Life"	1990	Inter Alia (ed. Macphail, Coventry University, 1990)		Lead story of anthology
"Alone in His Chariot"	1991	Eidolon, Summer 1991 (ed. Jeremy G. Byrne)	Call to the Edge	Winner, Australian SF Award, 1992
"The Dominant Style"	1991	Aurealis No. 4 (ed. Stephen Higgins, Dirk Strasser)	Call to the Edge; Centaurus (ed. Damien Broderick and David G. Hartwell, Tor, 1999); Hayakawa's SF (Japan, April 2000)	Nominee, Australian SF Award, 1992
"The Eyes of the Green Lancer"	1992	Call to the Edge		
"Destroyer of Illusions"	1992	Call to the Edge		
"The Porphyric Plague"	1992	Intimate Armageddons (ed. Bill Congreve)		
"Pax Romana"	1992	Call to the Edge		
"The Devils of Langenhagen"	1992	Call to the Edge		
"An Empty Wheelhouse"	1992	Analog Science Fiction and Fact, January 1992 (ed. Stanley Schmidt)	Metaworlds: Best Australian Science Fiction (Penguin, 1994)	
"Souls in the Great Machine"	1992	Universe 2 (ed. Karen Haber, Robert Silverberg)		
"The Glasken Chronicles"	1992	Eidolon, Autumn 1992 (ed. Jeremy G. Byrne)		
"Pacing the Nightmare"	1992	Interzone, May 1992 (ed. David Pringle, Lee Montgomerie)		
"A Greater Vision"	1992	Analog Science Fiction and Fact, October 1992 (ed. Stanley Schmidt)		
"The Way to Greece"	1993	Eidolon, Winter 1993 (ed. Jeremy G. Byrne, Jonathan Strahan)		
"Charon's Anchor"	1993	Aurealis No. 12 (ed. Stephen Higgins, Dirk Strasser)		
"The Miocene Arrow"	1994	Alien Shores: An Anthology of Australian Science Fiction (ed. Peter McNamara, Margaret Winch)		
"The Blondefire Genome"	1994	The Lottery: Nine Science Fiction Stories (ed. Lucy Sussex)		
"A Ring of Green Fire"	1994	Interzone, November 1994 (ed. David Pringle, Lee Montgomerie)		
"Lucky Jonglar"	1996	Dream Weavers (ed. Paul Collins)		
"The Weakest Link"	1996	Dream Weavers (ed. Paul Collins)		
"Slow Famine"	1996	Interzone, May 1996 (ed. David Pringle)		
"Queen of Soulmates"	1998	Dreaming Down-Under (ed. Jack Dann, Janeen Webb)		
"Chronicler"	1998	Fantastic Worlds (ed. Paul Collins)		
"Rule of the People"	1998	Aurealis #20/21 (ed. Stephen Higgins, Dirk Strasser)		
"Souls in the Great Machine"	1999	Excerpt in The Centurion's Empire		
"New Words of Power"	1999	Interzone, August 1999 (ed. David Pringle)	Walking to the Moon	
"Colours of the Soul"	2000	Interzone, February 2000 (ed. David Pringle)	Walking to the Moon	
"Unthinkable"	2000	Analog Science Fiction and Fact, June 2000 (ed. Stanley Schmidt)		
"Mask of Terminus"	2000	Analog Science Fiction and Fact, October 2000 (ed. Stanley Schmidt)	Walking to the Moon	
"Voice of Steel"	2001	sf.com, 2002	Walking to the Moon; translated for Anticipatia (Romania), Nova Fantastyka (Poland), ESLI (Russia, 2005)	Nova Fantastyka Reader's Award winner (best translation), 2004; BSFA Award nominee, 2003
"Tower of Wings"	2001	Analog Science Fiction and Fact, December 2001 (ed. Stanley Schmidt)	The Best Australian Science Fiction Writing (ed. Rob Gerrand, Black Inc, 2004); Walking to the Moon	Analog Readers' Award winner, 2002
"Svyatagor"	2002	Andromeda Spaceways Inflight Magazine No. 3 (ed. Ian Nichols)		
"Walk to the Full Moon"	2002	The Magazine of Fantasy & Science Fiction, December 2002 (ed. Gordon Van Gelder)	Walking to the Moon	Aurealis Award winner, 2003
"The Last Page"	2003	Big Night In (ed. Jessica Adams, Juliet Partridge and Nick Earls, Penguin/Puffin)		With Paul Collins; charity anthology
"The Cascade"	2004	Agog! Smashing Stories (ed. Cat Sparks)	Year's Best SF 10 (ed. David G. Hartwell); Walking to the Moon	
"The Empire of the Willing"	2005	Future Washington (ed. Ernest Lilley)		
"The Engines of Arcadia"	2006	Futureshocks (ed. Lou Anders)		
"Electrisarian"	2006	Polder (ed. Mendlesohn, OEB)		
"The Measure of Eternity"	2006	Interzone No. 205, August 2006		
"Dragon Black"	2007	Pandora 01 (Germany, Shayol, trans. Jochen Schwarzer)	Walking to the Moon	Prequel to Souls in the Great Machine; German title "Schwarzdrache"
"The Twilight Year"	2008	The Magazine of Fantasy & Science Fiction, January 2008 (ed. Gordon Van Gelder)		
"Oblivion"	2008	2012 (ed. Alisa Krasnostein and Ben Payne, Twelfth Planet Press)		
"Striking Fear"	2008	Trust Me (ed. Paul Collins, Ford Street Publishing)		
"The Constant Past"	2008	Dreaming Again (ed. Jack Dann)		
"The Spiral Briar"	2009	The Magazine of Fantasy & Science Fiction, April–May 2009 (ed. Gordon Van Gelder)	Translated for Esli (Russia, September 2009)	
"The Art of the Dragon"	2009	The Magazine of Fantasy & Science Fiction, August–September 2009 (ed. Gordon Van Gelder)	Solaris (French Canadian, Autumn 2010)	
"Mother of Champions"	2009	Interzone No. 222 (ed. Andy Cox)		
"The Precedent"	2010	The Magazine of Fantasy & Science Fiction, July/August 2010 (ed. Gordon Van Gelder)		Basis for the 2022 novel Generation Nemesis
"Eight Miles"	2010	Analog, September 2010 (ed. Stanley Schmidt)	Year's Best SF 16 (ed. David G. Hartwell)	Hugo Award finalist, 2011
"Enigma"	2010	Analog, Jan/Feb 2010 (ed. Stanley Schmidt)		
"Spacebook"	2011	Anywhere But Earth (ed. Keith Stevenson)		
"Ninety Thousand Horses"	2012	Analog, Jan/Feb 2012 (ed. Stanley Schmidt)		Analog Readers' Award winner, 2013
"Electrica"	2012	The Magazine of Fantasy & Science Fiction, March/April 2012 (ed. Gordon Van Gelder)	Year's Best SF 18 (ed. David G. Hartwell)	
"Steamgothic"	2012	Interzone, July/August 2012 (ed. Andy Cox)	The Year's Best Science Fiction (30th Annual Collection, ed. Gardner Dozois); Ghosts of Engines Past	Sidewise Award nominee, 2013
"Hard Cases"	2012	Light Touch Paper, Stand Clear (ed. Edwina Harvey and Simon Petrie)		
"The First Boat"	2012	Aurealis, March 2012 (ed. Michael Pryor)		
"Running Invisible"	2012	Trust Me Too (ed. Paul Collins)		
"Culverelle"	2012	The Feathered Edge (ed. Deborah J. Ross)		
"Lost Faces"	2013	The Magazine of Fantasy & Science Fiction, March/April 2013 (ed. Gordon Van Gelder)		
"The Firewall and the Door"	2013	Analog, March 2013 (ed. Trevor Quachri)		
"Acts of Chivalry"	2013	Tales of Australia – Great Southern Land (ed. Stephen C. Ormsby)		
"Technarion"	2013	Interzone, Sept/Oct 2013 (ed. Andy Cox)		Interzone Readers' Poll winner (tied), 2014
"The Audience"	2015	McMullen, Sean (June 2015). "The Audience". Analog Science Fiction and Fact. 135 (6): 92–104.	McMullen, Sean (2016). "The Audience". In Clarke, Neil (ed.). The best science fiction of the year : volume 1. San Francisco: Night Shade Books.	Novelette
"Exceptional Forces"	2016	Asimov's Science Fiction, February 2016	Dreams of the Technarion	Asimov's Readers' Award finalist
"Two Hours at Frontier"	2017	Analog, November/December 2017 (ed. Trevor Quachri)		
"Wheel of Echoes"	2020	Analog, January/February 2020 (ed. Trevor Quachri)		Analog Readers' Award winner, 2021; Sidewise Award nominee, 2021
"The Chrysalis Pool"	2020	Analog, September/October 2020 (ed. Trevor Quachri)		
"The Elektron Mill"	2021	ParSec No. 2 (ed. Ian Whates)		Sean McMullen's 100th professional story
"After the Winter Solstice"	2024	Asimov's Science Fiction, January/February 2024		
"The Light of Darian"	2026	Analog, September/October 2026		Novelette

=== Non-fiction ===
Books

- The MUP Encyclopaedia of Australian Science Fiction & Fantasy (1998, assistant editor with Paul Collins)
- Strange Constellations: A History of Australian Science Fiction (1999 with Russell Blackford and Van Ikin)
- Fantastical Worlds and Futures at the World's Edge: A History of New Zealand Science Fiction and Fantasy (2020, with Simon Litten)

Essays and articles

- Beyond Our Shores (1990) in Eidolon Winter 1990
- The High Brick Wall (1990) in Eidolon Spring 1990 (ed. Jeremy G. Byrne)
- Not in Print but Worth Millions (1991) in Eidolon Winter 1991 (ed. Jeremy G. Byrne)
- Book Review (1991) in Aurealis No. 5 (ed. Stephen Higgins, Dirk Strasser)
- Going Commercial and Becoming Professional (1991) in Eidolon Spring 1991 (ed. Jeremy G. Byrne)
- Australian SF Art Turns 50 (1992) in Eidolon Summer 1992 (ed. Jonathan Strahan, Jeremy G. Byrne)
- Far from Void: The History of Australian SF Magazines (1992) in Aurealis #7 (ed. Stephen Higgins, Dirk Strasser)
- Skirting the Frontier (1992) in Eidolon Autumn 1992 (ed. Jeremy G. Byrne)
- Showcase or Leading Edge: Australian SF Anthologies 1968–1990 (1992) in Aurealis #9 (ed. Stephen Higgins, Dirk Strasser)
- From Science Fantasy to Galileo (1992) in Eidolon Spring 1992 (ed. Jeremy G. Byrne, Jonathan Strahan)
- Australian Content: The State of Quarantine (1993) in Eidolon Summer 1993 (ed. Jeremy G. Byrne, Jonathan Strahan)
- Australian Content: Suffering for Someone Else's Art (1993) in Eidolon Autumn 1993 (ed. Jonathan Strahan, Jeremy G. Byrne)
- Protection, Liberation and the Cold, Dangerous Universe: The Great Australian SF Renaissance (1993) in Aurealis #11 (ed. Stephen Higgins, Dirk Strasser)
- No Science Fiction Please, We're Australian (1993) in Eidolon Winter 1993 (ed. Jeremy G. Byrne, Jonathan Strahan)
- The Quest for Australian Fantasy (1994, with Steven Paulsen) in Aurealis No. 13 (ed. Stephen Higgins, Dirk Strasser)
- Australian Content: The Great Transition (1994) in Eidolon Winter 1994 (ed. Jonathan Strahan, Jeremy G. Byrne)
- The Hunt for Australian Horror Fiction (1994, with Steven Paulsen) in Aurealis No. 14 (ed. Stephen Higgins, Dirk Strasser)
- A History of Australian Horror (1995, with Bill Congreve and Steve Paulsen) in Bonescribes: Year's Best Australian Horror: 1995 (ed. Bill Congreve, Robert Hood)
- SF in Australia (1995, with Terry Dowling) in Locus January 1995 (ed. Charles N. Brown)
- Australian Content: Recognition Australian Style (1995) in Eidolon Summer 1995 (ed. Jeremy G. Byrne)
- Australia: Australian Contemporary Fantasy (1997, with Steven Paulsen)
- George Turner and the Nova Mob (1997) in Eidolon, Issue 25/26 Spring 1997 (ed. Jonathan Strahan, Jeremy G. Byrne, Richard Scriven)
- The Road to 1996 (1998, with Terry Dowling) in Nebula Awards 32 (ed. Jack Dann)
- The British Benchmark (1999) in Interzone August 1999 (ed. David Pringle)
- Time Travel, Times Scapes, and Timescape (2000, with Russell Blackford, Alison Goodman, Damien Broderick, Aubrey Townsend, Gregory Benford) in The New York Review of Science Fiction August 2000 (ed. Kathryn Cramer, David G. Hartwell, Kevin J. Maroney)
- 25 (Celebrating 25 Years of Interzone) (2007) in Interzone September–October 2007 (ed. Andrew Hedgecock, Jetse de Vries, Andy Cox)
- Shot in Australia, in the anthology Projections — described on McMullen's own website as the first history of Australian science fiction for the screen
- Outpost of Wonder: SF in Australia 1832–2017 (2018), a 37,000-word history of Australian science fiction, included in Dreams of the Technarion
