= Jack Wodhams =

British author

- Born: 3 September 1931; Dagenham, United Kingdom
- Died: 3 August 2017 (aged 85)
- Writing career
- Language: English
- Years active: 1967-2015

Jack Wodhams (1931–2017) was an English-born science fiction writer who lived in Australia from 1955 until his death. He also wrote as Trudy Rose and Caroline Edwards. Wodhams was born on 3 September 1931, in Dagenham (London) and died on 3 August 2017.

He was first published in Analog Science Fiction and Fact in 1967 with the story There Is a Crooked Man. He was largely known for the kind of "problem oriented" stories that Analog itself is known for. These stories have been called "generally clever and often ingenious" and good on military matters, but occasionally criticised as facetious. From 1970 to 1982, he was nominated for the Ditmar Award several times.

== Bibliography ==
=== Novels ===
- The Authentic Touch (1971)
- Looking for Blucher (1980)
- Ryn (1982)

=== Short story collection ===
- Future War (1982)

=== Prose collection ===
- The Small Book of Controversies (2003)

=== Short stories ===
- "Homespinner" (Galaxy Science Fiction, October 1968)
