= Keith Taylor (author) =

Australian writer (born 1946)

- Born: 26 December 1946; Tasmania, Australia
- Writing career
- Pen name: Dennis More, Cadmus Evans
- Period: 1975–present
- Genres: science fiction, fantasy

Keith John Taylor (born 26 December 1946) is an Australian science fiction and fantasy writer. He also wrote as Dennis More, Cadmus Evans and Melinda Ross.

== Biography ==
Born in Tasmania, Taylor now resides in Melbourne, Australia. Getting his start in Ted White's Fantastic, Taylor went on to collaborate with Andrew J. Offutt on two novels based upon the Robert E. Howard hero, Cormac Mac Art – an Irish Viking active in King Arthur's time.

Taylor's series of novels centering on an Irish character of his own creation – the bard Felimid mac Fal – was published throughout the 1980s. Much of Taylor's fictional output in the 1990s was in the Arthurian fantasy subgenre. Many stories featuring his character, Kamose the Magician, were published in Weird Tales in the late 1990s and early 2000s.

Taylor suffered a protracted illness beginning in 2003. He is reported to be working on new fiction.

== Bibliography ==
=== Novels ===
Bard

- Bard (1981)
- Bard II (1984, also known as Bard II: The First Long Ship)
- Bard III: The Wild Sea (1986)
- Bard IV: Ravens' Gathering (1987)
- Bard V: Felimid's Homecoming (1991)

Danans

- The Sorcerer's Sacred Isle (1989)
- The Cauldron of Plenty (1989)
- Search for the Starblade (1990)

Other novels

- When Death Birds Fly (1980, with Andrew J. Offutt, part of the Cormac Mac Art series)
- Lances of Nengesdul (1982)
- The Tower of Death (1982, with Andrew J. Offutt, part of the Cormac Mac Art series)

=== Short fiction ===
- "Fugitives in Winter" (1975, as Dennis More) in Fantastic October 1975 (ed. Ted White)
- "The Atheling's Wife" (1976, as Dennis More) in Fantastic August 1976 (ed. Ted White)
- "The Forest of Andred" (1976, as Dennis More) in Fantastic November 1976 (ed. Ted White)
- "On Skellig Michael" (1977, as Dennis More) in Swords Against Darkness II (ed. Andrew J. Offutt)
- "Buried Silver" (1977, as Dennis More) in Fantastic February 1977 (ed. Ted White)
- "Hungry Grass" (1979) in Swords Against Darkness V (ed. Andrew J. Offutt)
- "Buried Silver" (Excerpt from Bard) (1981) in The Pendragon Chronicles: Heroic Fantasy from the Time of King Arthur (ed. Mike Ashley)
- "Where Silence Rules" (1981) in Distant Worlds (ed. Paul Collins)
- "The Lost Ship" (1983) in Frontier Worlds (ed. Paul Collins)
- "Spirit Places" (1985) in Faery! (ed. Terri Windling)
- "The Conqueror of Vectis" (1985) in Day of the Tyrant (ed. Jerry Pournelle)
- "Men from the Plain of Lir" (1988) in Weird Tales Fall 1988 (ed. George H. Scithers, Darrell Schweitzer, John Gregory Betancourt)
- "The Haunting of Mara" (1988) in Weird Tales Fall 1988 (ed. George H. Scithers, Darrell Schweitzer, John Gregory Betancourt)
- "The Ordeal Stone" (1988) in Weird Tales Fall 1988 (ed. George H. Scithers, Darrell Schweitzer, John Gregory Betancourt)
- "The Unlawful Hunter" (1988) in Weird Tales Spring 1988 (ed. George H. Scithers, Darrell Schweitzer, John Gregory Betancourt)
- "The Harvest of Malice" (1988) in Argos: Fantasy and Science Fiction Magazine Spring 1988 (ed. Ross Emry)
- "The Demon Cat" (1989) in Weird Tales Winter 1989/1990 (ed. George H. Scithers, Darrell Schweitzer, John Gregory Betancourt)
- "Revenant" (1991) in Weird Tales Winter 1991/1992 (ed. Darrell Schweitzer)
- "Spears of the Sea-Wolves" (1991) in Weird Tales Summer 1991 (ed. Darrell Schweitzer)
- "The Brotherhood of Britain" (1992) in The Camelot Chronicles: Heroic Adventures from the Time of King Arthur (ed. Mike Ashley)
- "The Castles of Testing" (1996) in The Chronicles of the Holy Grail (ed. Mike Ashley)
- "The Favour of a Tyrant" (1996) in Classical Whodunnits: Murder and Mystery from Ancient Greece and Rome (ed. Mike Ashley)
- "The Walking Walls of Rome" (1996) in Classical Stories: Heroic Tales from Ancient Greece and Rome (ed. Mike Ashley)
- "Sunchosen" (1996, as Cadmus Evans) in Dream Weavers (ed. Paul Collins)
- "At the Edge of the Sea" (1996) in Dream Weavers (ed. Paul Collins)
- "The Scribe of a Hundred Lies" (1996, as Melinda Ross) in Dream Weavers (ed. Paul Collins)
- "The White Doe" (1996) in Fantasy Stories (ed. Mike Ashley)
- "Tournament of Rogues" (1997) in The Chronicles of the Round Table (ed. Mike Ashley)
- "Sir Lionel in Tournament of Rogues" (1997) in The Chronicles of the Round Table (ed. Mike Ashley)
- "The Bath-house" (1998) in Fantastic Worlds (ed. Paul Collins)
- "Daggers and a Serpent" (1999) in Weird Tales Summer 1999 (ed. George H. Scithers, Darrell Schweitzer)
- "Emissaries of Doom" (1999) in Weird Tales Winter 1999 (ed. George H. Scithers, Darrell Schweitzer)
- "Dragon Hunter" (1999) in Dragon Tales (ed. Paul Collins, Meredith Costain)
- "Haunted Shadows" (2000) in Weird Tales Fall 2000 (ed. George H. Scithers, Darrell Schweitzer)
- "The Lady and the Demon" (2001, with Paul Collins) in Stalking Midnight (ed. Paul Collins)
- "The Emerald Scarab" (2001) in Weird Tales Spring 2001 (ed. George H. Scithers, Darrell Schweitzer)
- "Lamia" (2001) in Weird Tales Winter 2001–02 (ed. George H. Scithers, Darrell Schweitzer)
- "A Spear in the Night" (2002) in Legends of the Pendragon (ed. James Lowder)
- "What Are You When the Moon Shall Rise?" (2002) in Weird Tales Summer 2002 (ed. George H. Scithers, Darrell Schweitzer)
- "The Company of the Gods" (2003) in Weird Tales Spring 2003 (ed. George H. Scithers, Darrell Schweitzer)
- "The Archpriest's Potion" (2003) in Weird Tales July–August 2003 (ed. George H. Scithers, Darrell Schweitzer)
- "Corpse's Wrath" (2006) in Weird Tales August–September 2006 (ed. George H. Scithers, Darrell Schweitzer, John Gregory Betancourt)

Source: ISFDB.com

== Awards and nominations ==
Wins

- Ditmar Award, Best short Australian science fiction or fantasy, 1982: "Where Silence Rules"
- Ditmar Award, Best Australian novel, 1987: Bard III: The Wild Sea

Nominations

- Ditmar Award, Best long Australian science fiction or fantasy, 1982: Bard
- Ditmar Award, Best Australian science fiction or fantasy, 1983: Lances of Nengesdul
- Ditmar Award, Best Australian long fiction, 1988: Bard IV: Ravens' Gathering
- Ditmar Award, Best Australian long fiction, 1990: The Sorcerers' Sacred Isle
- Aurealis Award for Best Young Adult Short Story, 1997: "At the Edge of the Sea"
- Aurealis Award for Best Fantasy Short Story, 1999: "The Bath-house"
