= Russell Blackford =

Australian philosopher

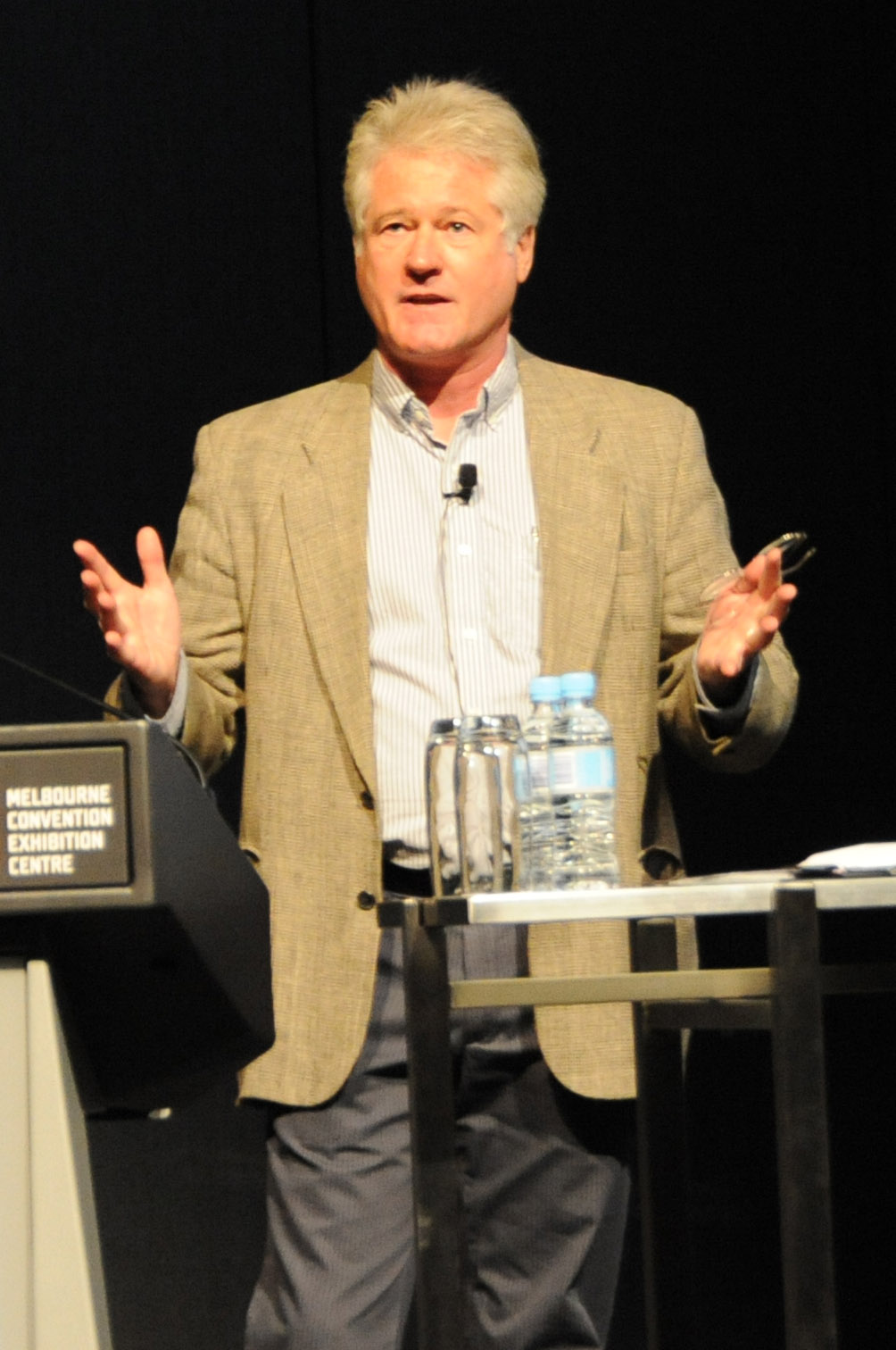
- Russell Blackford speaking at 2010 Global Atheist Convention
- Born: 1954 (age 71–72); Sydney
- Occupations: Writer, philosopher and critic
- Writing career
- Genres: Science fiction, fantasy & horror
- Website: russellblackford.com

Russell Blackford (born 1954) is an Australian writer, philosopher, and literary critic.

== Early life and education ==
He completed a PhD at Monash University for a thesis entitled "The philosophy of human enhancement". His supervisor was Justin Oakley.

== Career ==
As a fiction writer, Blackford specialises in science fiction, fantasy and horror fiction. His work includes four novels published by iBooks, three of them forming an original trilogy (The New John Connor Chronicles) set in the world of the Terminator movies. His non-fiction work frequently deals with issues involving science and society, particularly philosophical bioethics, cyberculture, transhumanism, and the history and current state of the science fiction genre. His work has appeared in many magazines, journals, and reference books, and has been featured most prominently in Quadrant, a monthly journal of literature and policy. It draws on his academic qualifications in a number of fields.

Since 2008, he has also been a Fellow of the Institute for Ethics and Emerging Technologies. He was a speaker at the 2010 Global Atheist Convention and a contributor to The Australian Book of Atheism.

== Bibliography ==
=== Novels ===
- The Tempting of the Witch King, Melbourne, Cory & Collins, 1983, ISBN 0-909117-18-7.
- The New John Connor Chronicles:
  - Dark Futures: Book One of Terminator 2: The New John Connor Chronicles, iBooks, August 2002, 336p, ISBN 0-7434-4511-2.
  - An Evil Hour: Book Two of Terminator 2: The New John Connor Chronicles, iBooks, May 2003, 368p, ISBN 0-7434-5863-X.
  - Times of Trouble: Book Three of Terminator 2: The New John Connor Chronicles, iBooks, September 2003, 384p, ISBN 0-7434-7483-X.
- Kong Reborn, ibooks, Inc. November 2005, 320p, ISBN 1-59687-133-4.

=== Non-fiction books ===
- Hyperdreams: Damien Broderick's Space/Time Fiction (OCLC 44838585), Originally published in 1998 as chapbook 8 in the Babel Handbooks series on Fantasy and Science Fiction Writers. Review of the writings of SF author Damien Broderick.
- Strange Constellations: A History of Australian Science Fiction (with Van Ikin and Sean McMullen), Greenwood Press, Contributions to the Study of Science Fiction and Fantasy, May 1999, 264p, ISBN 0-313-25112-6.
- Freedom of Religion and the Secular State, Wiley-Blackwell, 2012. ISBN 978-0-470-67403-1.
- 50 Great Myths About Atheism (with Udo Schuklenk), Wiley-Blackwell, 2013. ISBN 978-0470674055.
- Humanity Enhanced: Genetic Choice and the Challenge for Liberal Democracies, MIT Press, 2014. ISBN 978-0262026611.
- The Mystery of Moral Authority, Palgrave Pivot, 2016. ISBN 978-1-137-56269-2.
- Science Fiction and the Moral Imagination: Visions, Minds, Ethics, Springer, 2017. ISBN 978-3319616834.
- The Tyranny of Opinion: Conformity and the Future of Liberalism, Bloomsbury, 2018 ISBN 978-1350056008.
- How We Became Post-Liberal: The Rise and Fall of Toleration, Bloomsbury, 2023 ISBN 978-1350322943.

=== Editor ===
- Urban Fantasies, anthology of 13 stories, edited with David King, Ebony, 1985. ISBN 978-0-9590655-1-0.
- Contrary Modes, proceedings of the academic track of Aussiecon 2, edited with Jenny Blackford, Lucy Sussex and Norman Talbot, 1985. ISBN 978-0-9590655-2-7.
- 50 Voices of Disbelief: Why We Are Atheists, co-editor with Udo Schuklenk, 2009. ISBN 978-1-4051-9045-9.
- Intelligence Unbound: The Future of Uploaded and Machine Minds, co-editor with Damien Broderick, 2014. ISBN 978-1118736289.
- Philosophy's Future: The Problem of Philosophical Progress, co-editor with Damien Broderick, 2017. ISBN 978-1119210092.

Blackford in 2005

=== Academic articles ===
- "Judicial Power, Political Liberty and the Post-Industrial State." Australian Law Journal 71 (1997): 267–93.
- "Thinking about Cloning: A Reply to Judith Thomson." Journal of Law and Medicine 9 (2001): 238–50.
- "Stranger Than You Think: Arthur C. Clarke's Profiles of the Future." Prefiguring Cyberculture: An Intellectual History. Ed. Darren Tofts, Annemarie Jonson, and Alessio Cavellaro. Sydney: Power Publications, 2002; co-published Boston: MIT Press, 2003: 252–63.
- "Try the Blue Pill: What's Wrong with Life in a Simulation?" Jacking In to the Matrix Franchise: Cultural Reception and Interpretation. Ed. Matthew Kapell and William Doty. New York: Continuum, 2004: 169–82.
- "Should We Fear Death? Epicurean and Modern Arguments." Immortality Institute, ed. The Scientific Conquest of Death: Essays on Infinite Lifespans. Buenos Aires: LibrosEnRed, 2004: 257–69.
- "Human Cloning and 'Posthuman' Society." Monash Bioethics Review 24 (2005): 10–26.
- "Stem cell research on other worlds, or why embryos do not have a right to life." Journal of Medical Ethics 32 (2006): 177–80.

=== Short stories ===
- "The Load on Her Mind", Westerly Volume 27, (1982). ISSN 0043-342X.
- "Crystal Soldier" (1983) in Dreamworks: Strange New Stories (ed. David King) ISBN 978-0-909106-11-9.
- "Glass Reptile Breakout" (1985) in Strange attractors: Original Australian speculative fiction (ed. Hale and Iremonger) ISBN 978-0-86806-208-2.
- "The Sword of God" (1996) in Dream Weavers (ed. Paul Collins).
- "Lucent Carbon" (1997) in Eidolon (Australian magazine), #25/26.
- "The Soldier in the Machine" (1998) in Dreaming Down-Under (ed. Jack Dann, Janeen Webb).
- "Byzantium vs Republic of Australia" (1998) in Aurealis #20/21.
- "The King with Three Daughters" (2000) in Black Heart, Ivory Bones (ed. Ellen Datlow, Terri Windling) ISBN 978-0-380-78623-7
- "Two Thousand Years" (2000) in Eidolon (Australian magazine) #29/30.
- "Smoke City" (2003) in Gathering the Bones (ed. Ramsey Campbell, Jack Dann, Dennis Etchison) ISBN 978-0-7322-8068-0
- "The Name of the Beast Was Number" (2004) in Microcosms (ed. Gregory Benford) ISBN 978-0-7564-0171-9
- "Idol" (2004) in Oceans of the Mind XII - reprinted (2014) in Novascapes (ed. C.E. Page).
- "Manannan's Children" (2008) in Dreaming Again: Thirty-five New Stories Celebrating the Wild Side of Australian Fiction (ed. Jack Dann).
