= Anna Jacobs =

English novelist (born 1941)

- Born: 1941 (age 84–85) Rochdale, Lancashire, England

Website
- www.annajacobs.com

Anna Jacobs (born 1941) is an English novelist. She graduated from the University of Leeds in 1962, before emigrating to Australia in 1973. She has written 109 novels, the majority of which are historical sagas (published by Hodder & Stoughton) or familial or relationship stories (published by Allison & Busby) published under her own name. She has also written fantasy novels, published under the name Shannah Jay. In 2006, her novel Pride of Lancashire won the Australian Romantic Novel of the Year Award.

== Books ==
=== Published by Hodder & Stoughton ===
The Gibson Family:

- Salem Street (1994)
- High Street (1994)
- Ridge Hill (1995)
- Hallam Square (1995)
- Spinners Lake (1996)

The Kershaw Sisters:

- Our Lizzie (1998)
- Our Polly (2000)
- Our Eva (2002)
- Our Mary Ann (2003)

The Settlers:

- Lancashire Lass (2000)
- Lancashire Legacy (2001)

The Staley Family:

- Down Weavers Lane (2002)
- Calico Road (2005)

The Irish Sisters:

- A Pennyworth of Sunshine (2003)
- Twopenny Rainbows (2004)
- Threepenny Dreams (2004)

The Music Hall Series (Preston Family):

- Pride of Lancashire (2005)
- Star of the North (2006)
- Bright Day Dawning (2006)
- Heart of the Town (2006)

Lady Bingram's Aides:

- Tomorrow's Promises (2007)
- Yesterday's Girl (2008)

The Swan River Saga:

- Farewell to Lancashire (2009)
- Beyond the Sunset (2010)
- Destiny's Path (2013)

The Traders:

- The Trader's Wife (2011)
- The Trader's Sister (2012)
- The Trader's Dream (2012)
- The Trader's Gift (2013)
- The Trader's Reward (2014)

The Rivenshaw Saga:

- A Time to Remember (2015)
- A Time for Renewal (2015)
- A Time to Rejoice (2016)
- Gifts For Our Time (2017)

The Ellindale Saga:

- One Quiet Woman (2017)
- One Kind Man (2018)
- One Special Village (2018)
- One Perfect Family (2019)

The Birch End Saga:

- A Daughter's Journey (2019)
- A Widow's Courage (2020)

Backshaw Moss:

- A Valley Dream (2021)
- A Valley Secret (2021)
- A Valley Wedding (2022)

Standalone Novels:

- Jessie (1997)
- Like No Other (1999)
- Freedom's Land (2008)

=== Published by Allison & Busby ===
The Wiltshire Girls:

- Cherry Tree Lane (2010)
- Elm Tree Road (2011)
- Yew Tree Gardens (2012)

The Hope Trilogy:

- A Place of Hope (2012)
- In Search of Hope (2013)
- A Time for Hope (2014)

Greyladies Trilogy:

- Heir to Greyladies (2013)
- Mistress of Greyladies (2014)
- Legacy of Greyladies (2015)

Peppercorn Street:

- Peppercorn Street (2014)
- Cinnamon Gardens (2015)
- Saffron Lane (2017)
- Bay Tree Cottage (2018)
- Christmas in Peppercorn Street (2019)

Honeyfield:

- The Honeyfield Bequest (2016)
- A Stranger in Honeyfield (2017)
- Peace Comes to Honeyfield (2018)

Penny Lake:

- Changing Lara (2019)
- Finding Cassie (2020)

Waterfront:

- Mara's Choice (2021)
- Sarah's Gift (2022)

=== Published under Shannah Jay ===
The Chronicles of Tenebrak:

- Quest (1994)
- Lands of Nowhere (1995)
- Shadow of the Serpent (1995)
- The Price of Wisdom (1996)

Second Chronicles of Tenebrak:

- Tenebrak the Founding (2010)

Standalone novels:

- Envoy (1994)
- Sword of Azaray (2012)
