= Paul Collins (fantasy writer) =

Australian writer & editor (born 1954)

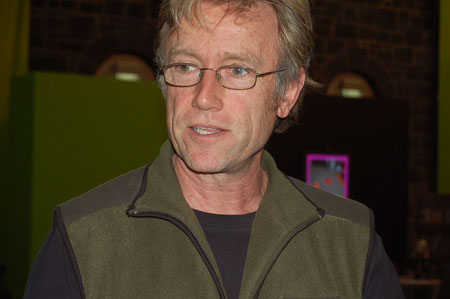
- Paul Collins in 2007
- Born: 21 May 1954 (age 72); Canvey Island, England
- Occupations: Writer & Editor
- Writing career
- Genres: science fiction, fantasy
- Notable work: the Quentaris Chronicles The Jelindel Chronicles
- Website: www.paulcollins.com.au

Paul Collins (born 21 May 1954) is an Australian writer and editor who specializes in science fiction and fantasy.

Collins has written many books for younger readers. He is best known for his fantasy series, The Jelindel Chronicles (Dragonlinks, Dragonfang, Dragonsight and Wardragon) and The Quentaris Chronicles (Swords of Quentaris, Slaves of Quentaris, Dragonlords of Quentaris, Vampires of Quentaris, Princess of Shadows, The Forgotten Prince and The Spell of Undoing), and his science fiction series, The Maximus Black Files (Mole Hunt, Dyson's Drop and The Only Game in the Galaxy).

Paul's latest fantasy books, written in collaboration with Sean McMullen, are six titles in The Warlock's Child series: The Burning Sea, Dragonfall Mountain, The Iron Claw, Trial by Dragons, Voyage to Morticas and The Guardians.

In addition to his novels, Collins has written over a hundred chapter books, around thirty non-fiction hardcovers for the education market (published both in Australia and the USA), and 150 short stories, the best of which appeared in two collections. He co-edited four boxed sets of anthologies with Meredith Costain (Spinouts and Thrillogies), edited around fifteen trade anthologies, and was the principal editor of The MUP Encyclopaedia of Australian Science Fiction and Fantasy.

== Biography ==
Paul Collins was born in England, raised in New Zealand and moved to Australia in 1972. His first published work was the Western novel Hot Lead-Cold Sweat (1975). That same year, in order to support himself so that he could write, Collins launched Void, the first professional science fiction magazine Australia had seen since the demise of the joint Australian and British production Vision of Tomorrow. Collins edited and published five issues of Void between August 1975 and March 1977, and while it only covered costs, the magazine was instrumental in encouraging lapsed writers Wynne Whiteford and Jack Wodhams to take up writing again, as well as encouraging a new generation of Australian science fiction writers and readers.

In 1978, Collins moved from magazine to book publishing, initially with the Worlds original anthology series, but later with a series of original Australian science fiction and fantasy novels. In 1981 Collins was joined by Rowena Cory (A.K.A. Cory Daniells) who painted many of the covers for their books, and Cory and Collins went on to publish fourteen Australian science fiction and fantasy novels by authors, such as Wynne Whiteford, A. Bertram Chandler, Jack Wodhams, Keith Taylor, Russell Blackford, and David Lake. With the posthumous publication of Chandler's novel The Wild Ones, however, Collins decided that publishing was interfering with his own writing and he closed the business.

Collins pioneered the publishing of adult heroic fantasy in Australia and did much to raise the profile of Australian genre writing. Many of the books and stories he published have been republished overseas. He sold his first professional fantasy story in 1977 to the United States magazine Weirdbook, and by 1980 he had sold another eleven stories to magazines and books in Australia and overseas.

Collins has a black belt in both Taekwondo and jujitsu and was a kickboxer, experience he puts to good use in his recent, fast-paced cyber-oriented tales, which have culminated in the cyberpunk novel Cyberskin. The latter has been published by clocktowerfiction.com (USA), Hybrid Publishers (Australia) and Heyne Verlag (Germany). His stories have sold to a wide variety of mainstream and genre magazines. The best of his work has been collected in The Government in Exile, published by Melbourne's Sumeria Press in 1994. A later collection, Stalking Midnight, has been published by cosmos.com in both POD and e-book.

Collins returned to editing in 1994 to compile Metaworlds, an anthology of Australia's best recent science fiction, for Penguin Books. This was followed by Strange Fruit, an anthology of dark fantasy tales with a literary bent. About this time Collins began to develop an interest in young adult literature, in terms of both his writing and editing. Angus & Robertson published his children's fantasy novel The Wizard's Torment, which was likened by Sophie Masson (Reading Time, May 1996) to the classic fantasies The Worm Ourobouros and The Well at the World's End. It has since been selected by the New South Wales Department of Education and Training for their Bookshelf List, and extracts were published in School Magazine. Meanwhile, Collins compiled the young adult anthology Dream Weavers for Penguin, the first original Australian heroic fantasy anthology ever. This was followed by a similar book called Fantastic Worlds and the Shivers series of children's horror novels from HarperCollins. Hodder published Paul's next anthology, Tales from the Wasteland in 2000. Collins has also written under the name Marilyn Fate, and he and Sean McMullen have both used the pseudonym Roger Wilcox.

Collins' recent output has been mostly for children. Certainly the success of his YA anthology, Dream Weavers, and possibly its sequel, Fantastic Worlds, has encouraged him to write and edit for younger readers. His young adult science fiction novel trade books, The Earthborn and The Skyborn, were published by TOR in the States, and the third book in the trilogy, The Hiveborn, was published by Bohemian Ink. His 100,000-word fantasy novels, Dragonlinks, Dragonfang and Dragonsight were published by Penguin Australia. The fourth title in The Jelindel Chronicles, Wardragon, was published by Ford Street Publishing.

His story with Rick Kennett, "The Willcroft Inheritance', appeared in Charles L. Grant's Gothic Ghosts, TOR, 1997 and was picked up by Ellen Datlow and Terri Windling for their Recommended Reading List Year's Best. Other recent stories appeared in Australian Short Stories and the award-winning Dreaming Down-Under. His adult horror novel, The Beckoning, was published by Damnation Books in 2013.

Paul and partner Meredith Costain have written 18 books on countries, all of which have sold to American publisher Chelsea. Paul's eight books on martial arts also sold into America.

Paul compiled and edited a seven-volume boxed set, called Book People — Meet Australia's Favourite Children's Authors and Illustrators. Macmillan released these early 2002. He and Meredith also compiled and edited the science fiction series Spinouts. There were three sets: Spinouts Silver, Bronze and Sapphire. They also put together a series called Thrillogy, for Pearson Education. Authors featured are, among others, Richard Harland, Christine Harris, Glyn Parry, Jackie French, Jenny Pausacker, John Heffernan, Allan Baillie, Justin D'Ath and Robert Hood. Illustrators include Shaun Tan, Terry Denton, Craig Smith and Sally Rippin.

Paul's latest writing includes a fantasy trilogy written in collaboration with Danny Willis. The World of Grrym comprises Allira's Gift, Lords of Quibbitt and Morgassa's Folly. In November 2009 Celapene Press published his much-acclaimed The Slightly Skewed Life of Toby Chrysler.

Paul also teaches writing in schools and has an increasing demand on his time for school visits.

Currently Paul has three plays to be published by Pearson Australia and two short story collections written in collaboration with Meredith Costain for Scholastic Australia.

== Creative Net Speakers' Agency ==
Collins founded Creative Net Speakers' Agency to showcase some of the authors and illustrators he now publishes. He represents some of Australia's best-known authors and illustrators including Leigh Hobbs (Australia's Children's Laureate), Isobelle Carmody, Kirsty Murray, Gabrielle Wang, Scot Gardner and Archimede Fusillo.

== Ford Street Publishing ==
Collins is the founder and publisher of Ford Street, "a successful small independent Australian publisher [which publishes] around eight titles a year, ranging from picture books through to novels and non-fiction for older readers." It has published books by, among others, Michael Salmon, Doug MacLeod, Sean McMullen, Justin D'Ath, Alyssa Brugman, James Roy, David Miller, Jenny Mounfield, Gary Crew, Hazel Edwards, Dianne Bates, Isobelle Carmody and Collins himself.

== Awards ==
- 1980s – 2000s a handful of nominations for Best Editor and Best Short Fiction in the Australian SF Achievement Awards
- 1999 – Winner William Atheling Jr. Award for work on The MUP Encyclopaedia of Australian Science Fiction and Fantasy; Shortlisted for the Aurealis Convenor's Award.
- 2000 – The Dog King, Notable Book Children's Book Council; Shortlisted for the Clayton's Award.
- 2001 – (With Co-editor Meredith Costain) Winner the Aurealis Convenor's Award for Spinouts Bronze published by Pearson Education. (Joint winner was Shaun Tan for The Lost Thing.)
- 2002 – Winner of the inaugural Peter McNamara Award for lifetime achievement in SF.
- 2004 – Home Run, Notable Book Children's Book Council.
- 2009 – Morgassa's Folly (in collaboration with Danny Willis), short-listed for the Chronos Award.
- 2010 – The Slightly Skewed Life of Toby Chrysler, short-listed for The Speech Pathology Award.
- 2011 – The Glasshouse (illustrated by Jo Thompson) chosen by international IBBY as an Outstanding Book; short-listed for the CBCA's Crichton Award.
- 2011 – Recipient of the Chandler Award for "Outstanding Achievement in Australian Science Fiction".
- 2013 – Trust Me Too Notable Book (Younger Readers) Children's Book Council of Australia (editor).
- 2013 – Trust Me Too White Raven selection (International Youth Library in Germany) (editor)

== Quote ==
- "Australia is not the science fiction capital of the world; in fact we are probably not even on the map. This unfortunate fact would change if we could produce more writers like Paul Collins." Michael Hanrahan, Australian Book Review.
