= Feast of Souls =

2007 novel by C. S. Friedman

- First edition (hardcover)
- Author: C. S. Friedman
- Cover artist: Michael Whelan (hardcover) and John Jude Palencar (paperback)
- Language: English
- Series: Magister Trilogy
- Genre: Fantasy
- Publisher: DAW Books
- Publication date: January 2, 2007
- Publication place: United States
- Media type: Print (hardcover)
- Pages: 464 (hardcover)
- ISBN: 0-7564-0432-0 (hardcover)
- OCLC: 77486446
- Followed by: Wings of Wrath

Feast of Souls (ISBN 0756404630) is a fantasy novel by American writer Celia S. Friedman. It is the first book in the Magister Trilogy. It was published in 2007 by DAW books.

In this first book of the trilogy, Friedman introduces readers to a world of high fantasy, replete with vampire-like magical powers, erotic interludes, treachery, war, sorcery, and a draconic creature of horrific power and evil.

== Summary ==
In this fantasy, the first of a new trilogy, the world's magic comes at a terrible cost: a witch's own finite life force, which drains away with each spell. The sole exceptions are the immortal Magisters, who secretly tap a more murderous fuel for their power. No woman has ever found its source, until young Kamala, hardened by life as a child whore, insists on an apprenticeship and secretly becomes an unheard-of female Magister. Meanwhile, Prince Andovan, third son of the avaricious King Danton, is expiring from the baffling Wasting disease, which can only be caused by a Magister. When the enraged king banishes his right-hand Magister, the mysterious and sinister Kostas takes his place, much to the dismay of Andovan's mother, Queen Gwynofar. As an ancient, monstrous power stirs and threatens to drag the world toward a dark age, Kamala and Andovan find their fates entwined.

== Characters ==
- Kamala, a Magister woman from an impoverished, nightmarish background.
- Colivar, a Magister of indeterminate age and background.
- Danton Aurelius, king of the High Kingdom.
- Andovan, third son of Danton.
- Gwynofar, queen and wife of Danton, mother of Andovan. Daughter of the Lord and Lady Protector of Kierdwyn.
- Rhys, bastard half-brother of Gwynofar.
- Ramirus, Magister contracted to the service of Danton and the High Kingdom.
- Kostas, a Magister with apparent sinister motives.
- Sideria, Witch-queen of the Free Peoples and frequent fraternizer with many different Magisters.
- Ethanus, A Magister living a solitary life, disconnected from typical Magister society.
