= This Alien Shore =

1998 novel by C.S. Friedman

First edition (publ. DAW Books) Cover art by Michael Whelan

This Alien Shore is a science fiction novel by American author Celia S. Friedman. It was originally released in hardcover in August 1998 and in paperback in June 1999.

This Alien Shore, which explores the second age of space colonization, was selected as a New York Times Notable Book of the Year.

== Plot ==
An explosion in her habitat sends young Jamisia Shido scrambling through the corridors to an escape capsule. Intercepted by an interstellar passenger ship, she sets out for the stars pursued by inner demons, as well as terran and galactic pursuers. Demons hide in the depths of jump-space as well, much as killer whales pursue seals diving from one ice-floe to the next.

=== History of Interstellar Travel ===
The book takes place in the far future when interstellar flight has caused mutations in the human race. Some were minute differences, some to the point of grotesquerie. These mutations eventually lead to the cessation of interstellar flight, stranding a majority of the population away from their culture and supplies that were rooted on Earth. This causes worlds to reinvent themselves, with some coming out stronger. Eventually, one planet discovers a method of interstellar travel that does not cause adverse effects. They create a company called the Outspace Guild. Due to the mutations, the Guild is the only one that can use this method of travel, and it quickly becomes a monopoly.

=== Computers advances ===
Throughout this time, computers have advanced to a point that they are necessary for all facets of life. It is introduced early in the book that each person is entitled to have a computer installed in their brain at birth. Unfortunately, it is impossible to reinstall different computers due to the complexity of the nervous system and how it is intricately tied into the body. It is possible to have additional "brainware" installed later in life, though this is both dangerous and illegal. Even so, some people have it done; they refer to themselves as "moddies" or "being mod". In this future, it is extremely important to make sure that the best hardware is installed. The government in this future has guaranteed that all people shall be entitled to hardware, but the rich will tend to upgrade it for their children to guarantee them a better lifestyle.

The computers that are integrated into the brain help regulate bodily functions, such as causing a regular release of adrenaline at a scheduled time. They can also set up tasks and reminders for the mind, and can be used for communication with others. Computer viruses have become more dangerous, as the computer can control base functions, thus making a person vulnerable to attack on a much different level.

== Characters ==
Dr. Kio Masada - A scientist from the Guild planet that works to learn about a virus that shows up as something that could destroy society in the current state.

Jamisia Shido - A female from a space habitat near Earth. Secret illegal therapy for a disaster that killed her parents has left Jamisia with an acute form of dissociative identity disorder and may have made her the key in the fight against the virus.

Alternate personalities residing in Jamisia Shido

Derik - One of only two (confirmed) male personalities residing in Jamisia, he is violent and reckless and considers himself the protector of the group. He usually swears profoundly when things go wrong.

Raven - A smart person taught how to fly spaceships by Shido Corporation as part of their plan to unseat the Guild monopoly.

Verina - The smartest person residing in Jamisia's body, she knows a lot, and gives the impression of being a more mature woman.

Katlyn - A female who enjoys seducing men and pleasures of the flesh.

Zusu - A girl who is always frightened, though not as much as the unnamed one. Her whimpering often annoys the Others, who usually tell her to shut up.

The Children - Several unnamed personalities who don't play much of a role in the story, but when they do appear, they usually just voice a child's concern about what is happening.

The Unnamed One - This unnamed boy spends much of the story curled up in a tight ball in a corner of Jamisia's brain, alone with his monstrous fears. He only speaks at the end of the book, to help Raven and Jamisia navigate the ainniq. He has Outpilot's Syndrome, the insanity required to see the sana (the most vicious predators known to humanity, they reside in the ainniq and feed on human souls).
