= Celia S. Friedman =

American speculative fiction author

- Friedman in 2026
- Born: January 12, 1957 (age 69); New York City, U.S.
- Occupations: Fiction writer and teacher
- Writing career
- Period: 1987–present
- Genres: Science fiction, fantasy
- Website: csfriedman.com

Celia S. Friedman (born January 12, 1957) is an American speculative fiction author who often writes as "C. S. Friedman". Originally a costume designer, Friedman began her publishing career in 1986. She quit costuming in 1996 to write full-time. As of 2022, she has published fourteen novels, numerous short stories—several of which were included in her 2021 collection The Dreaming Kind—and a sourcebook for White Wolf's Vampire: The Masquerade role-playing game.

Friedman was nominated for the John W. Campbell award for Best New Writer in 1988 (now called the Astounding Award, and her novel This Alien Shore was a New York Times Notable Book of the Year in 1998.

In August 2022, Deadline reported that Bohemia Group, a global management firm, was shopping a potential television series based on The Coldfire Trilogy, which was a finalist for NPR's Science Fiction and Fantasy Vote in 2011.

== Works ==
No.	Title	Release date	ISBN	Comments
The Endless War/Azean Empire duology
1	In Conquest Born	April 1986	ISBN 0-88677-198-6	paperback with two covers, each the reverse of the other
1	In Conquest Born	April 1989	–	hardcover; Science Fiction Book Club edition
1	In Conquest Born	August 1992	ISBN 0-09-960690-9	paperback; UK edition
1	In Conquest Born	November 2001	ISBN 0-7564-0043-0	paperback; 15th anniversary edition – includes a new intro and glossary.
1	In Conquest Born	May 15, 2012	–	audiobook
2	The Wilding	July 2004	ISBN 0-7564-0164-X	hardcover
2	The Wilding	July 2005	ISBN 0-7564-0202-6	paperback
2	The Wilding	May 15, 2012	–	audiobook
The Coldfire trilogy
	Nightborn: Coldfire Rising	July 18, 2023	ISBN 0-75641-092-4	hardcover; prequel
	Dominion	January 9, 2012	-	eBook; short story set between prequel and main trilogy
1	Black Sun Rising	October 1991	ISBN 0-88677-485-3	hardcover
1	Black Sun Rising	March 1992	–	hardcover; SFBC edition
1	Black Sun Rising	September 1992	ISBN 0-88677-527-2	first paperback printing
1	Black Sun Rising	September 2005	ISBN 0-7564-0314-6	trade paperback
1	Black Sun Rising	May 15, 2012	–	audiobook
2	When True Night Falls	September 1993	ISBN 0-88677-569-8	hardcover
2	When True Night Falls	December 1993	–	hardcover; SFBC edition
2	When True Night Falls	August 1994	ISBN 0-88677-615-5	paperback
2	When True Night Falls	October 2005	ISBN 0-7564-0316-2	trade paperback
2	When True Night Falls	May 15, 2012	–	audiobook
3	Crown of Shadows	October 1995	ISBN 0-88677-664-3	paperback
3	Crown of Shadows	February 1996	–	hardcover; SFBC edition
3	Crown of Shadows	July 1996	ISBN 0-88677-717-8	paperback
3	Crown of Shadows	November 2005	ISBN 0-7564-0318-9	trade paperback
3	Crown of Shadows	May 15, 2012	–	audiobook
The Outworlds series
1	This Alien Shore	August 1998	ISBN 0-88677-798-4	hardcover
1	This Alien Shore	June 1999	ISBN 0-88677-799-2	paperback
1	This Alien Shore	January 2000	ISBN 0-00-648375-5	paperback; United Kingdom edition
1	This Alien Shore	May 15, 2012	–	audiobook
2	This Virtual Night	November 2, 2020	ISBN 0-7564-0988-8	hardcover
3	This Variant Seed	TBA	-	work in progress
The Magister trilogy
1	Feast of Souls	January 2007	ISBN 0-7564-0432-0	hardcover
1	Feast of Souls	February 2008	ISBN 0-7564-0463-0	paperback
1	Feast of Souls	May 15, 2012	–	audiobook
2	Wings of Wrath	February 3, 2009	ISBN 0-7564-0535-1	hardcover
2	Wings of Wrath	February 2, 2010	ISBN 0-7564-0594-7	paperback
2	Wings of Wrath	May 15, 2012	–	audiobook
3	Legacy of Kings	August 23, 2011	ISBN 0-7564-0693-5	hardcover
3	Legacy of Kings	September 4, 2012	ISBN 978-0756407483	paperback
3	Legacy of Kings	May 15, 2012	–	audiobook
Dreamwalker Series
1	Dreamwalker	February 4, 2014	ISBN 0-75640-888-1	hardcover
2	Dreamseeker	November 3, 2015	ISBN 0-75640-895-4	hardcover
3	Dreamweaver	December 6, 2016	ISBN 0-75640-908-X	hardcover
Standalone books
	The Madness Season	September 1990	ISBN 0-88677-444-6	paperback
	The Madness Season	May 15, 2012	–	audiobook
	The Erciyes Fragments	April 1998	ISBN 1-56504-297-2	hardcover; a Vampire: The Masquerade novella
Short Works
	The Dreaming Kind	1989	ISBN 0-88677-355-5	in Catfantastic
	Downtime	2002	ISBN 0-7564-0064-3	in 30th Anniversary DAW Science Fiction Collection
	Terms of Engagement	June 2006	ISSN 1095-8258	in The Magazine of Fantasy and Science Fiction
	Shall We Dance?	2006	ISBN 0-7564-0369-3	in Hags, Sirens, and other Bad Girls of Fantasy
	Soul Mate	November 30, 2010	ISBN 1-5960-6336-X	in Speculative Horizons by Subterranean Press
	Perfect Day	March 1, 2012	ISSN 0024-984X	in The Magazine of Fantasy & Science Fiction

There are at least two other shorts: "Downtime" and "Eye of the Needle".
