= Wings of Wrath =

2009 novel by C. S. Friedman

- Author: C. S. Friedman
- Cover artist: John Jude Palencar
- Language: English
- Series: Magister Trilogy
- Genre: Fantasy
- Publisher: DAW Books
- Publication date: February 3, 2009
- Publication place: United States
- Media type: Print (Hardcover)
- Pages: 496 (Hardcover)
- ISBN: 0-7564-0535-1 (Hardcover)
- OCLC: 233548315
- Preceded by: Feast of Souls
- Followed by: Legacy of Kings

Wings of Wrath (ISBN 0756405351) is a fantasy novel by American writer Celia S. Friedman. It is the second book in the Magister Trilogy. It was published in 2009 by DAW books.

Its plot follows almost immediately after the plots of the previous book, Feast of Souls. While the point of view is always in third-person, the focus shifts between many different characters, including minor ones, to hear their thoughts during the course of a section of story.

== Plot summary ==
The story opens with Kamala returning to Ethanus, despite the usual unwillingness of Magisters to show weakness around others of their kind. He willingly protects her while she heals, but tells her that he will turn her over to the Magisters to face justice for her violation of their Law (although he tells her this only so that she will flee to safety).

Meanwhile, Salvator returns to the High Kingdom after his mother offers him the throne. A great deal of the political intrigue of the novel centers around the fact that Salvator is a monk of a monotheistic religion at odds with that of his mother, and that he will have to give up his monastic vows to take the throne, with many believing he will cling to pacifism, and others believing he will turn from his religion - if he turns either way, his political enemies can celebrate victory.

Rhys returns to Kierdwyn with evidence of an attack by a souleater, including some pieces of its armored hide and a tale of how quickly the beast disintegrated after its death. Fearing that a souleater south of the Wrath means that there must be a weak point along it, the Lord Protector sends Rhys and another guardian to look for the point where the Wrath may have become so damaged. On their way, Kamala watches them from high above as a bird, and seeks to find a way to join their company. Seeing a trap laid for them, she tries to return to human form, but the power of the Wrath is too great and she nearly dies, passing out until after they have fallen into the trap. Rhys is captured and his companion apparently killed. Kamala sets aside her power and manages to rescue him via subterfuge and a lot of luck, and they finally ride north together to investigate the Wrath.

When they arrive, they discover that the Spears that make up the Wrath were not cast down by gods, as myth indicated, but rather were created by witches who built their own tombs around themselves, and slowly died within. Their sufferings provided the power for the Wrath to function. This drives Rhys into a great crises of faith, as there is suddenly no evidence of divine interaction and thus he believes there are no gods (or that they are not involved in the world). He does not share these thoughts with anyone other than Kamala.

Returning to Kierdwyn, they share some information about the Wrath itself, and Kamala trades a handful of brick she had taken from the Spear to Ramirus in exchange for a promise of future aid.

Meanwhile, Sideria has been approached with an offer from a mysterious stranger, claiming to be able to make her immortal. Intrigued, she accepts his offer and accompanies him far from her castle to a ravine, blocked at both ends, where a female souleater has been trapped. Sideria, already seeming to bond with the creature, is furious at those who brought her, and climbs down into the pit. The souleater accepts her, and they form a bond that gives Sideria access to the souleater's power, and thus seeming immortality. They can also communicate telepathically, and sometimes their psyches seem to be merging into one (with either one alternately the stronger personality in different situations) such as the case when a guest visits Sideria's palace, only to be killed later by Sideria, who was temporarily being taken over by the souleater queen. Colivar visits her shortly thereafter and takes note of an unusual smell, but cannot remember where he has encountered it previously.

Ramirus helps translate a prophecy regarding the Lyr, and those present at the meeting in Kierdwyn (including Lazaroth, Kamala, Rhys, and Gwynofar) immediately recognize the need for a massive effort to be carried out. The ultimate goal will be finding a person with Lyr blood who has all seven Lyr clans equally represented, and having that person sit on an ancient throne that resides in a tower next to the keep Rhys had been imprisoned at. To achieve this, they coordinate a fake war with Salvator, bringing both Kierdwyn and High Kingdom forces to bear in a combined attack. While doing this, Gwynofar, Rhys, Kamala, and several others sneak to that tower and climb it. While inside, they discover enemies lying in wait, and have to fight. Gwynofar barely manages to reach the chair, and activates its power. Suddenly, all Lyr in the world are connected, and they all receive a shared vision (to varying degrees) that, among other things, leads them to the same truth that Rhys had discovered regarding the formation of the Wrath and the apparent inactivity of the gods. Gwynofar and Kamala are allowed to walk out quietly, as everyone on both sides of the battle is stunned by their discovery. Rhys, however, has fallen in battle.

Colivar, having remembered what the unusual smell means (created by bonding with a souleater), takes Lazaroth, Ramirus, and one other Magister, return to Sideria's castle in an attempt to find her and confront her. They discover that most of the people in the castle have been killed or at least placed into a coma by souleater attack, and Sideria has gotten away.

== Characters ==
- Kamala, the only known female Magister.
- Colivar, a Magister of indeterminate age and background.
- Salvator, son of the late Danton Aurelius and heir to the throne.
- Gwynofar, queen and wife of Danton, mother of Salvator. Daughter of the Lord and Lady Protector of Kierdwyn. Full-blooded lyr.
- Rhys, bastard half-brother of Gwynofar. Half-lyr.
- Ramirus, Magister contracted to the service of Gwynofar and the High Kingdom.
- Sideria, Witch-queen of the Free Peoples.
- Ethanus, The Magister who trained Kamala, who she still turns to as a master.
- Lazaroth, Magister Royal of Kierdwyn.
- Nyuku, a young Kannoket boy who lives north of The Wrath and dreams of serving the gods. His narrative is told in flashback.
