= Magister Trilogy =

The Magister Trilogy is a fantasy trilogy written by Celia S. Friedman. It includes:

- Feast of Souls (2007)
- Wings of Wrath (February 3, 2009)
- Legacy of Kings (August 23, 2011).
