= Coldfire Trilogy =

1991–1995 science fiction/fantasy series by Celia S. Friedman

The Coldfire Trilogy is a science fiction/fantasy trilogy written by Celia S. Friedman. It includes:

- Black Sun Rising (1991)
- When True Night Falls (1993)
- Crown of Shadows (1995).

== Synopsis ==
The main events of the trilogy take place on the fictional planet of Erna, which was colonized by a group of humans from a future Earth 1200 years before the period in which Friedman's trilogy is set.

Erna is a primarily hospitable environment; although a planet with severe and intense seismic activity, it is similar enough to Earth to allow for habitability.

However, unlike Earth, the entire surface of Erna is wrapped in a powerful energy field known as "the Fae"--a type of energy that comes up to the surface from the core of the planet via a plethora of volcanoes and earthquakes which rock the planet's surface. This is an energy that the native animals of Erna sense and utilize to help them survive (i.e. the Fae is often able to tell a Sensitive individual when an earthquake is coming or if the tides are about to shift). Similar to the Earth's magnetic field, C.S. Friedman explains how if magic existed, it would be a natural force governed by consistent rules. "Like fire, it should be useful when controlled, dangerous if uncontrolled," she says.

The energy is also sensitive to the human psyche, as the colonists discovered to their dismay. The Fae reacts to human cerebral activity, bringing to life dreams and manifesting fears. In fact, many of the first colonists were killed by Fae-constructs, demons and beasts that fed off of their human progenitors, both physically and mentally. It was only by a Great Sacrifice, the loss of all the technology and knowledge the colonists had brought with them, that humanity came to terms with the Fae, at least enough to learn a rudimentary level of control over the power.

For a few hundred years, humanity has managed to eke out a scant existence on the harsh surface of Erna, keeping an uneasy balance with the Fae. Mankind grows weary of its tumultuous battle with the energy-force however, and multiple organizations try to find ways to render the human psyche unable to mold the Fae. One of these groups was the Church of Human Unification, an organization that sought to bring mankind together in prayer to accomplish two things: 1) make the Fae recognize man as a regular race on Erna, allowing them to live in harmony with the energy, and 2) allow for a human afterlife by bringing mankind to the bosom of a God that either already exists, or will be made by the power of the faith of man, and the Fae it will mold. This Church eventually brought forth a man who would be their salvation and damnation, their Prophet, one Gerald Tarrant.

=== When True Night Falls ===
When True Night Falls
- First edition
- Author: Celia S. Friedman
- Cover artist: Michael Whelan
- Language: English
- Series: Coldfire Trilogy
- Genre: Fantasy
- Publisher: DAW Books
- Publication date: October 1, 1993
- Publication place: United States
- Media type: Print (hardcover)
- Pages: 553
- ISBN: 0-88677-569-8
- OCLC: 29001423
- Dewey Decimal: 813/.54 20
- LC Class: PS3556.R5184 W44 1993
- Preceded by: Black Sun Rising
- Followed by: Crown of Shadows

In When True Night Falls, Damien, Hesseth, and Tarrant land on the shores of the Eastern Continent where the order of the Church have managed to subdue the unconscious working of the Fae. Consequently, the technology of the civilization is far more advanced than the Western Continent as is seen by the casual use of explosive weapons and fireworks. While conversing with various leaders, the group learns that only women are allowed to rise to the highest ranks in the Eastern Church. Many rarely see the Matria or holy women of the Church except for odd snippets of time and it is discovered by the group that the Matria and holy women are in fact rakh disguised with tidal fae.

After learning of the corruption starting on the Eastern Continent the group manage to trace it south, to the crystal palace of the Immortal Prince, and his Iezu servant, Calesta. Along the way, they rescue a young girl, Jenseny, whose father was killed and impersonated by the Prince's rakh servants. Jenseny is driven near to madness by events she has seen and her rare ability to see and control tidal fae. While scared and untrustful she manages to form a bond with Hesseth who is unable to bear children as was ritual to the rakh who journey away from their homes to mingle with humans.

The Prince makes a deal with Tarrant; in return for immortality, the Hunter must lead Hesseth, Damien, and Jenseny into a trap. But there was one catch to the deal: the Immortal Prince's plans include the corruption of the Church, and the former Prophet is not willing to accept that.

Meanwhile, Damien, Hesseth and Jenseny cross a seemingly endless desert populated with scraggly white trees and skeletons. Damien is hesitant to cross the desert as the skeletons indicate some form of predator but sees nothing that could possibly pose a true threat. The group decides to cross and settle down for the night under a tree. Damien and Hesseth awaken to find that the tree's roots have begun to grow into their bodies. While at first they cannot move, they both eventually break free of the trees and find that Jenseny's body has also been invaded by the roots. Damien cut away the roots but feared that they might still be harmful to the young girl. The trio keeps traveling without rest to avoid the roots of the trees. They finally find rest on a granite outcropping. That evening when Gerald returns, he kills the roots of the tree that are still inside Jenseny. Damien then Heals the wounds that are left when Gerald is finished.

Soon afterwards the group notice that there are large quadrupeds headed towards them with the intent purpose of killing them. In the escape that follows, Hesseth willingly gives up her life to save Jenseny - feeling that Jenseny was much akin to a child of her own and thereby willing to possess the greatest honor in sacrifice.

Tarrant joins the group at nightfall and leads Damien and Jenseny into the trap in the Prince's lands but finds a way to smuggle a coldfire-worked knife into Damien's hands. Damien attempts to kill the Prince, but the Prince's soul jumps into the body of his rakh captain. Jenseny finds the coldfire knife, and, hiding it, makes a deal with the Immortal Prince: he can have her body, and with it, her ability to work the tidal fae, a newly evolved human trait. The Prince agrees, but just as he is entering her body, Jenseny weaves a bond between herself and the Prince, and sacrifices herself to kill the Prince.

Following the Prince's death, Damien and Gerald Tarrant return north where civil unrest has broken out due to the revealing of the corruption in the Church. The new leader of the Church plans to purge the Eastern Continent which in turn infuriates Tarrant as that was not Tarrant's conception of the Church. However, in Tarrant's confrontation with the new leader, Tarrant accidentally shares a "divining" of the possible fall of the Church thereby bringing the new leader to his senses and stopping the slaughter of thousands of innocent lives. By doing so, Tarrant breaks his oath to the Unnamed and endangers his life in the process - a fact Calesta is quick to catch on to.

== Erna ==
The planet upon which the entirety of the series takes place. It is the only habitable planet that a landing crew from Earth found in their many centuries of searching. The terrain of Erna is, for the most part, much like Earth. The primary difference is Erna's severe seismic activity; earthquakes, large or small, are a common phenomenon on virtually every corner of the planet. An energy field called the Fae envelops and wraps every inch of Erna.

=== Day and Night ===
The night-day schedule of Erna is much different and less regular than Earth's, given the strange schedules of Erna's heavenly bodies. Daylight is provided by the star of Erna's system, a much dimmer entity than Earth's Sol, as well as the slightly less luminous Core, a cluster of stars in the middle of the galaxy visible by Ernans. The night is dominated by three moons, of differing sizes; the erratic lunar schedule created makes mapping the tides of Erna almost impossible. Erna's peculiar placement in the galaxy also provides for an infrequent and mysterious phenomena: every few months, the sun and the Core, as well as the three moons and every visible star manage to set and disappear, enveloping Erna in total blackness. Creating what is known as True Night, a time of particular mystique and power for the series.

=== Geography ===
The series takes place in the Eastern and Western Hemispheres of the planet, with the majority taking place in the Western continent(s). The Western lands are more populated in the eastern and southern portions of the continent, the east centralized around the port city and human hub of Jaggonath. To the west are the Rakhlands, a wild, untamed testament to the old nature of Erna, where the aboriginal species of the rakh live. Human lands and Rakhlands are separated by the Canopy, a Bermuda Triangle-esque anomaly in the Fae. To the north are seismically active mountain ranges, and the famed/dreaded Mount Shaitan, a hub of wild and powerful Fae. The Eastern lands have an almost opposite population distribution, with most people residing in the west and north, getting less populated toward the east and south. The lands themselves are separated into two notable geographic landmasses, one to the north, and one the south. The two lands are apparently in pitched warfare during the series, and are separated by a dangerous stretch of ocean. The southernmost portion of the South-Eastern continent are colloquially referred to as the blacklands, a deserted patch of cracked, black terrain that is notoriously uninhabited and hostile.

== Characters ==
=== Damien Vryce ===
A Warrior Priest of the Church of Human Unification on Erna. He is the trilogy's main character, and the plot is mostly explored through his perspective. At the start of the tale he is firmly devoted to his faith, almost to the point of zealotry. He is highly experienced in combat, having traveled all over the Western Continent battling demons and malignant Fae-Constructs in service of his Church. Ironically enough, he is also a moderately skilled sorcerer, one of the few in his order.

He comes from the jurisdiction of the Matriarch of the West, one of the two primary leaders of the Church. She is more flexible in regards to the teachings of their faith, and believes that it may actually be of use to the Church for certain priests to be allowed to Work the Fae, just as the Neocount of Merentha once suggested. Damien is part of the order of knights she enlisted with the task of learning to Work the Fae, and to teach the ability to fledgling warriors across the world.

In traveling with the fallen Prophet, Gerald Tarrant, his initially stern views on right and wrong are tested and warped, as he is forced to accept the help of and to save the life of an individual he normally would have died to kill. In the end, he must find a way to meld his faith with necessity, risking everything he is to save humanity.

=== Gerald Tarrant ===
The Neocount of Merentha, the Prophet of the Church for Human Unification on Erna. He was a visionary, an individual who sought more adamant uses of the Fae to tame the planet, which was contrary to the Church's primary goal of rendering humans null to the Fae. He sacrifices his humanity to gain untold control over the Fae by murdering his wife and children in a dark ritual. Thus was born the Hunter.

The Hunter is an Adept with unfathomable capability and power. In the sacrifice he gained a control over the Fae no man had ever dared dream of before. Not only can he control the Earth Fae with ease, he can now utilize the elusive and tantalizing Dark Fae, with which he can perform the most arcane and dark of Workings.

He becomes a vital component to the trilogy's story, which centers around the travels of the priest Damien Vryce. One of the primary plots of this series revolves around the Hunter's redemption, something that is thrust upon him as the story progresses.

=== Ciani ===
A powerful Adept of Jaggonath. She serves as Damien's first romantic interest in the books, and the catalyst for the events of the series.

She makes her living selling Worked objects to the people of Jaggonath: wards and talismans to protect people from Fae-made demons (Constructs). A group of mysterious demons, later revealed to be Rakh, assaults her in Black Sun Rising, sapping her of her memories and Adeptitude, thus setting Damien and Senzei on a quest to the Rakhlands to hunt down her assailant in hope of Ciani's resulting restoration.

She is a wise and powerful woman, capable of Workings many Adepts would be jealous of. She is, however, helpless without her abilities, and latches on to the Hunter, becoming his apprentice in hopes of restoring some vestige of the power she lost.

She stays in the rakhlands at the end of the first book, forsaking her old life to live amongst the rakh.

=== Senzei Reese ===
A sorcerer of average ability and extensive knowledge of the Fae. He works as Ciani's assistant at her shop in Jaggonath.

He is a man possessed of an inherent desire for knowledge, consumed by an ever-ravenous hunger to become an Adept. He is jealous of their ability to see and interact with the Fae, and is deeply sorrowful of the fact that Adeptitude is something one is born with, rather than something learned.

This desire costs him dearly. One of the first things he loses is his betrothed. She had been with him for years, and loved him dearly, but could no longer tolerate being second in his life to something she could not compete with. His desire for the Fae was something she could do nothing about, and eventually she left him. Ultimately he loses his life to his obsession. In a spurt of madness induced by the Iezu Calesta, he steals a vial of Sacred Fire (pure, liquified solar fae) from Damien, believing it would give him the powers of an Adept. Instead he is incinerated.

=== Hesseth ===
A female of the Rakh race, and one of the few of her kind capable of human speech. She joins Damien's group in the Rakhlands in order to defeat the Keeper of the Souls. As the Rakh are a native species, she has the ability to manipulate the Tidal Fae like an Adept would Earth Fae.

A fierce warrior with a fiery hatred of humans, Hesseth struggles with her prejudice while in the company of Damien Vryce, a human possessed of an understanding she thought humans were incapable of. After starting off hostile towards him and the other group members, she develops an uneasy friendship with Damien and follows him to the Eastern Continent, even though the threat there was not necessarily of her concern. In encountering the young Adept Jenseny, she discovers a strong maternal side to herself, coming to love and care for the lost little girl as if she were her own. In the end, she gives her life to allow Damien and Jenseny a chance to survive in the harsh lands of the Undying Prince.

=== Jenseny ===
The young daughter of a powerful dignitary in the lands of the Undying Prince. She is an Adept struggling with her newfound abilities, and possesses the capacity to manipulate the Tidal Fae, an ability heretofore unheard of among humans.

She runs away from home after her father is killed and impersonated by a member of the corrupted rakh serving the Prince. She is captured by a savage group of humans under the Prince's manipulation, all forced into an illusion that makes them look perpetually young. Eventually she is rescued by Damien and his party, developing a strong familial bond to Hesseth, who reciprocates.

The body-shifting Prince sought to make her his new body, and captured her for this purpose. As his soul moved into her physical self, she used the few moments where she still had control to kill herself, and trap the Prince in her mind, preventing him from moving back to his original body and escaping death.

=== Andrys Tarrant ===
The last living human member of the Tarrant line. He is introduced in the third book of the trilogy, and plays a key role in the story's culmination. He is an almost exact duplicate of Gerald Tarrant, merely more human-looking.

While his family was alive, he was their black sheep. A womanizing, booze-guzzling, pill-popping miscreant, his brothers and sisters all pressured him to change his ways, which he refused to do, being addicted to the thrill of it all. He was a care-free youth, until he returned home one day.

He is the descendant of Gerald Tarrant's eldest son, the one he let live so his family line could continue. Tarrant gave his son an irrevocable commandment: he was the one and only Neocount of Merentha, and no one else was to claim that title. If one of his male descendants did, Tarrant vowed to slaughter them all. Defying this warning, Andrys' eldest brother, Samuel took the title for himself, and sealed his fate, as well as those of many of his siblings. Andrys would come home one day after that to discover his entire family brutally and mercilessly slaughtered, Tarrant appearing to tell him that he was only left alive to ensure the survival of his line. This has damaged Andrys severely, making him dependent on many different kinds of powerful narcotics, and alcohol.

He is instilled with a very powerful need for revenge, that the Patriarch of the Church helps him realize, joining the latter's campaign to eliminate the Hunter once and for all.

=== The Patriarch of the East ===
One of the two prime leaders of the Church for Human Unification on Erna. An adamant zealot of his faith, he finds anything that has to do with the Fae abhorrent. He is immediately disposed to hate Damien given his connection to the Fae, and what he might represent for the Church.

A fierce, stern man, one whom even the pagans of the world respect for his opinions and presence. He hates the beliefs of the pagans, yet he is benevolent towards them.

Ironically enough, he is an Adept, and a very powerful one. This is something he had realized years ago, but had repressed in himself. Much to his dismay, Gerald Tarrant awakens the power in him, and instills in him the plot to cleanse the Forest.

In the end, he gives his life for the sake of mankind: he dies to ensure that the will of man cannot touch the Fae, unless he is willing to endure death for it.

=== The Keeper of Souls ===
A powerful Sorcerer who lives in the heart of the rakhlands. She serves as the primary antagonist of the first book of the trilogy, being the one who sent the Soul Stealers to Ciani's shop to steal her essence. Not being an Adept herself, she steals this essence from Adepts to augment her own abilities.

She lives on a fault line, a place most Adepts or Sorcerers wouldn't dare live by due to the high likelihood of sudden earthquakes, fatal to anyone who may be Working at the time. She however, has managed to Ward off the entire fault, managing to stabilize the fault albeit temporarily. This stabilization has welled up an incredible amount Earth Fae for her to use, allowing her to expand her powers steadily. She fails to see the folly in trying to stabilize a fault line of seismically active Erna however; Tarrant realizes that the Wards are doomed to fail, and might do so at any time. He uses this knowledge to eventually destroy her.

It is revealed soon after, that the Iezu Calesta was manipulating her the entire time.

=== The Undying Prince ===
The Adept antagonist of the second book of the trilogy. He resides in the dead lands south of the thriving portion of the Eastern continent. As Damien and the others make their way to his fortress, he attempts to derail them with an army of corrupted rakh.

He is a body-shifter. Using his immense abilities with the Fae, he transfers his soul from one body to another when needed, keeping his original preserved in a subterranean capsule. It is this ability that offsets Gerald Tarrant's initial attempt to end him, changing bodies when the Prophet made his move. And it is through this ability that he meets his end; Jenseny, as a child possessed of the ability to see and manipulate the Tidal Fae, the Prince believed her to be the next link in the human evolutionary chain, and sought her out to be his new vessel. But with her abilities, she entraps him in her mind, and then kills herself, taking him along with her.

He was another of Calesta's manipulations.

=== Calesta ===
The ultimate antagonist to the series. He is an Iezu, a mysterious breed of demon that feed exclusively on human emotion, and seem unaffected by human alterations of the Fae. The emotion on which he feeds is sadism, and his primary goal is to provide himself eternal sustenance.

He has orchestrated events in the world of men so that humanity will be transformed in his wake. He sought to recreate mankind into a species that existed to continually hate and destroy each other, offering him a never-ending feast until the death of the species.

The only way to destroy Iezu is to force upon it the emotion negative to the one on which it feeds. In Calesta's case, that is altruism. A damned Tarrant manages to kill the demon by forcing his altruistic intent upon Calesta at the climax of the novels.

== The Fae ==
As mentioned earlier, the Fae is a vast energy field that comes from within and around Erna to envelop its surface. Some individuals are possessed of the ability to manipulate, or Work it, to perform spectacular feats of magical ability. The Fae consists of at least four different types:

=== Earth ===
The most basic form of the Fae, the energy that wells up from the core of the planet. This is the Fae most Adepts and sorcerers can manipulate. It follows seismic activity and currents of lava flow, but the Fae that generates directly from earthquakes and volcanic eruptions is far too concentrated and volatile for humans to manipulate without allowing it time to dilute. If any sorcerer attempts to handle Fae made by an earthquake or eruption, his or her mind is instantly and painfully incinerated.

=== Tidal ===
A more mysterious and temperamental form of Fae than the Earth Fae, the Tidal Fae is very particular in who it lets manipulate it. Among humans, there are almost no men who can even see or feel this Fae, much less manipulate it. Some women can see it, but only one has ever been able to Work it. The rakh (an indigenous species to Erna that rapidly evolved from cat-like mammals to feline humanoids thanks to the Fae and the presence of the humans) however are able to Work this Fae extensively. It is a far less stable form of Fae than the Earth Fae, and is very unpredictable, its power level and Workability fluctuating with the tides, so using it for long-term Workings or for a long time is inadvisable, especially given the volatile tides generated by Erna's many moons.

=== Solar ===
The most powerful Fae, this is Fae generated by Erna's suns and the Core (a cluster of stars that make up the center of the Galaxy). While it is undeniably powerful, it is imperceptible to most individuals, and almost impossible to Work. The only instance in history where the Solar Fae was Worked was by a collective of Church Adepts who anointed and sanctified water with the Solar Fae in order to create weapons capable of penetrating and purifying the Dark Forest of the Hunter. The technique for Working Solar Fae has been lost to time, and there remain only a scant number of Church artifacts that still hold the Worked Solar Fae, the greatest of which was stolen and lost by Senzei Reese. This Fae will instantly neutralize any Dark Fae it comes into contact with, and is lethal to the Hunter.

=== Dark ===
The most powerful form of Fae accessible to humans, this energy originates from the darkness within the human heart. It appears only in unlit places and during True Night, a rare phenomenon occurring every few months when the sun, all moons, the Core, and visible stars set, leaving Erna in complete darkness. This subtle and sensitive form of Fae possesses considerable power and can achieve remarkable effects, though its use comes with significant consequences.
