= Crown of Shadows =

1995 novel by C.S. Friedman

- Author: C.S. Friedman
- Cover artist: Michael Whelan
- Language: English
- Series: Coldfire Trilogy
- Genre: Fantasy
- Publisher: DAW Books
- Publication date: October 1, 1995
- Publication place: United States
- Media type: Print (Hardcover)
- Pages: 448 pp (hardcover edition)
- ISBN: 0-88677-664-3 (hardcover edition)
- Preceded by: When True Night Falls

Crown of Shadows is a fantasy novel by American writer C.S. Friedman, first published in 1995 by DAW Books. It is the final book of the Coldfire Trilogy.

== Plot summary ==
Damien and Tarrant return to the west and Jaggonath, where they agree to work together long enough to kill Calesta. Damien discovers that the Patriarch of the Church, who is firmly against sorcery, is actually an Adept himself. Tarrant further strains relations with the Unnamed by revealing this fact to the Patriarch, and is dragged off to Hell for his pains. Damien convinces another Iezu, Karril, to lead him through Tarrant's personal Hell to the Unnamed, where he bargains for the Adept's life. The Unnamed agrees, on the condition that its contract with Tarrant will be broken in thirty-one days. If the Hunter has not found another way to sustain his immortal life by then, he will die. The Patriarch, already displeased at Damien's saving Tarrant for the first time in the Rakhlands, comes extremely close to casting him out of the priesthood. In the end, however, it is Damien who chooses to no longer be a priest, because his faith has been questioned too much by the Hunter, by himself, even by the Patriarch. Gerald Tarrant, on the other hand, has found a way to destroy an Iezu: feed it with the opposite emotion it normally thrives on. Karril, who lives off Pleasure, can also accept Pain, but Apathy will destroy him. Calesta, who embodies sadism, can only be destroyed by Altruism- the ultimate sacrifice, which Tarrant, amazingly, is willing to pay.

The pair make their way to Mount Shaitan, a Volcano exuding an amazing amount of earth fae. Tarrant forcefully binds Calesta by showing the depth of his sadism, then sacrificing himself, despite his belief he could still have lived forever, killing Calesta by exposing him to pure altruism. By this point, however, the Iezu's mother has been introduced. She created her children by taking emotions from human beings- in Karril's father's case, pleasure, in Calesta's, sadism. She takes away Gerald Tarrant's Hunter, the part of him that lives off pain and fear, creating the Iezu Riven Forrest. In the process, she shocks him back to life- human life. The Neocount of Merentha has been given a second chance. However, all is not well back in the forest. In the second book, readers learned that Tarrant had not killed all of his children when he made the sacrifice to the Unnamed- he let his eldest son live.

Now, after many generations, Andrys Tarrant has joined with the Patriarch in a campaign of vengeance. Gerald and Damien return to the Forest secretly, but are accosted by Andrys in the library, where they are trying to rescue the Hunter's Iezu notes from the destruction. Knowing he is about to die again, Gerald sends Damien from the room. Andrys emerges outside minutes later with the Hunter's severed head. Gerald Tarrant's original sacrifice, however, has changed the nature of the fae, so now any human willing to work it must also be willing to die. The Patriarch sacrifices himself, in a moving semi-final chapter, to ensure this effect will be permanent. Damien Vryce is left wondering what to do with the rest of his life, mourning the loss of Tarrant when he is approached by an arrogant youth who suggests that if Tarrant had been willing to sacrifice his identity, so he could never reclaim his former life, he could have created the illusion of his death and survived.
