= Black Sun Rising =

1991 science fantasy novel by C. S. Friedman

- Author: C. S. Friedman
- Cover artist: Michael Whelan
- Language: English
- Series: Coldfire Trilogy
- Genre: Science fiction
- Publisher: DAW Books
- Publication date: November 1, 1991
- Publication place: United States
- Media type: Print (hardback)
- Pages: 496 (hardcover reissue edition)
- ISBN: 0-88677-485-3 (hardcover reissue edition)
- OCLC: 24646990
- Dewey Decimal: 813/.54 20
- LC Class: PS3556.R5184 B5 1991
- Followed by: When True Night Falls

Black Sun Rising, published in 1991, is a science fantasy novel by American writer C. S. Friedman. It is the first book in the Coldfire Trilogy, followed by When True Night Falls.

== Plot introduction ==
Black Sun Rising takes place on the fictional planet of Erna, following the perspective of Damien Vryce, a priest of the Church of Human Unification on Erna. The tale begins with him entering the great city of Jaggonath, a mimicry of modern-day Jerusalem, as the pagan religions that advocate the worship of personal gods and the church of the One God share the city. He has come to assist the Patriarch of his Church with a new, somewhat controversial mission: teaching initiates of his Order the rudiments of sorcery with the energy force known as the Fae (detailed further in Coldfire Trilogy section). As the Church primarily resists human reliance on the Fae, the classes are opposed by the Patriarch, though held with high regard by the Matriarch whom Damien serves.

While in the city, Damien Vryce enters the shop of an Adept (individuals with the ability to sense the Fae on a level akin to a sixth sense) named Ciani, with whom he begins a light-hearted courtship. Their fledgling love is abruptly put on hold, however, when Ciani's shop explodes in a Fae-related accident. Damien presumes she is dead, but her assistant, Senzei "Zen" Reese, informs him otherwise. Ciani was alive, but mortally wounded, not physically but mentally and spiritually. She had been assaulted by a gang of unknown creatures that stole from her memories, and her skills as an Adept. This has left her bereft of a will to live; an Adept sees the Fae every waking moment, giving their vision a "life" to it that regular humans could not comprehend. Without her skill however, all she can see is a dead world. Senzei had set off the store as a Sacrifice, so as to hide the fact that Ciani was still alive.

Damien vows to help Ciani, and prepares to set off after the mysterious thieves. The Patriarch does not fully approve, but offers his blessing, and the aid of the Church's most valued relic: a vial of pure, liquified Solar Fae, the sacred Fire of the Church. Together with Ciani and Senzei, the trio leaves Jaggonath, tailing the sadistic creatures.

== Plot summary ==
As they make their way north, they encounter a man by the name of Gerald Tarrant, who marks himself as the servant of the Hunter, a powerful Adept who lives in the middle of a vortex of Fae. He accompanies them for a time, for unexplained reasons.

One night as the party rests at an inn near the Forest, they are accosted by the Soul Eaters responsible for Ciani's current condition. In the immense confusion of the battle, not helped by the mysterious appearance of a hooded woman who utilized the Tidal Fae, Tarrant loses self-control, and accidentally feeds upon the vulnerable Ciani, sapping her of her remaining memories. In a rage, Damien attempts to confront a strangely weakened Tarrant, who flees with Ciani. The two remaining of the party rush off to rescue Ciani from where she must have been taken; the Forest. The Priest and the Sorcerer manage to combat the dread creatures that feed on the Dark Fae swirling around the Forest, a winded Damien and a mortally wounded Senzei stumble upon an immense castle; a castle Damien eventually recognizes to be of Church-design. The Hunter's servants welcome them inside, and ask them to wait for their Master. To the surprise of all, the Hunter is none other than Gerald Tarrant himself; furthermore, Tarrant reveals himself to be the former Neocount of Merentha, and Prophet of the Church for Human Unification on Erna, Damien's church.

While Damien buckles under this revelation, Zen succumbs to wounds he sustained from the dark beasts of the Forest, which the Hunter offers to cleanse. As payment, Tarrant demands to be allowed to accompany the three of them on their journey. The Hunter is an insurmountably arrogant man; the assault by the Soul Eaters made him feed upon Ciani, a woman he vowed not to harm. Ironically, part of the forces that protect his existence is his honor, and reneging on any vow he makes could destroy him. He refused to allow anyone to make a fool of him, for which he seeks to find the Master of the Soul Eaters in order to punish him. Damien grows conflicted: on the one hand, the oaths of his Order demand that he do what he can to destroy this evil standing before him, and entering into a pact with him would be the blackest anathema; yet without the Hunter's help, it was very likely that the three of them would not survive to find Ciani's violators. With a heavy heart, he accepts.

The group then begin their way to the Rakhlands: a land inhabited by an intelligent and indigenous species of Erna called the Rakh. The Rakh are somewhat feline in appearance, but are very much humanoid, having evolved rapidly from their smaller, cat-like ancestors thanks to the appearance of the humans. They are primarily hostile to humans, given the latter's attempt at eradicating their race some hundreds of years ago.

To enter the Rakhlands, the party must cross the Canopy, an odd anomaly in the Fae, where it fluctuates in intensity and power randomly and rapidly. As Gerald Tarrant relies upon the Fae to live, this crossing nearly kills him. While he survived, he is hopelessly weakened, and would require months to heal under normal circumstances. Knowing this, Damien volunteers to feed Tarrant, as the Adept would be useless in his current condition, and the group needed him to survive. Tarrant reluctantly accepts, chafing at the idea of having to rely on another for his continued existence, and establishes a link between them that would allow the Hunter to feed on Damien's fears.

The Keeper sends a fae-born creature, Calesta, who uses Senzei's longing to be an Adept as a means to kill him. Calesta traps Tarrant with an image of his murdered wife, and binds him over a subterranean fire, where the Keeper of Souls feeds off his pain. Damien then must make a decision: should he rescue the Hunter, and unleash his evil power over the world again, or should he leave him to his fate and try to defeat the Keeper of Souls without an Adept's power? He ultimately decides to save Tarrant and worry about the consequences later. They defeat the Keeper of Souls by triggering an earthquake in the fault zone upon which the palace is built. As the party flees the Soul Eaters, they end up trapped in a dead-end tunnel. Tarrant collapses the tunnel, forming an escape route for Damien, Ciani, and Hesseth, exposing the Soul Eaters - and himself - to the killing sun.

Damien and Ciani return with Hesseth to the rakh village, where Ciani chooses to stay. Damien is ready to head back to the human lands when he receives a surprising visitor: Gerald Tarrant, who had somehow managed to survive his exposure to sunlight. Damien asks the Hunter to join him in his journey to the Eastern Continent of Erna, where he believes the corruption that turned rakh into Soul Eaters originates. Tarrant refuses; he has been badly burned by the sun, and doesn't relish the thought of traveling miles above the earth fae, which cannot be reached through deep water, with the man who has sworn to kill him. But, after a visit from Calesta nearly results in the breaking of an oath he had sworn long ago, the Hunter changes his mind and goes with Damien. Their experiences in the Eastern Continent are documented in the next book, When True Night Falls.

== Reception ==
John C. Bunnell of Amazing Stories wrote that Friedman "wields her world-builder’s paintbrush with sweeping strokes, creating a rich yet spare landscape and conveying a fineness of detail that’s often brutally sharp." Gail E. Roberts of Kliatt wrote that while the novel is "a bit long and involved", it is also "well written and well worth the effort", featuring "just the right mix of adventure, magic, humor, violence, and fantasy." Baird Searles of Asimov's Science Fiction opined that while Friedman has "developed the premise with a science fictional logic that gives the novel a different flavor from high fantasy", "her prolixity [...] really overbalances [her ideas]".

== Release details ==
- 1991, United States, DAW Books ISBN 0-88677-485-3, Pub date 1 November 1991, Hardcover reissue
- 1992, United States, DAW Books ISBN 0-88677-527-2, Pub date 1 September 1992, Paperback reissue
- 2005, United States, DAW Trade ISBN 0-7564-0314-6, Pub date 6 September 2005, Paperback reprint
