= In Conquest Born =

1986 science fiction novel by Celia S. Friedman

First edition (publ. DAW Books) Cover art by Michael Whelan

In Conquest Born is a 1986 science fiction novel by American author C. S. Friedman, which led to Friedman being nominated for the John W. Campbell Award for Best New Writer in 1988. The novel blends elements of space opera, anthropological science fiction, and military science fiction. The story takes place in the distant future where two societies of humans, the Azeans and Braxins, vie for control of their proximate interstellar territory, each using its distinctive talents and abilities.

The first edition DAW paperback has two covers. One shows the Azean female on the front with the Braxin male on the back, and vice versa.

There is a 15th Anniversary edition (DAW, 2001) that adds (1) a 1-page "Once Upon a Time", (2) a 3-page Introduction, and (3) a highly useful 30-page Glossary. Reading the Glossary first provides significant help in understand the work's setting and mythology. The Azean female and Braxin male from the 1st edition are shown together on the front cover.

== Characters ==
- Zatar – a Braxin general who is a Kaim'era
- Anzha lyu Mitethe – an Azean general with powerful psychic abilities
- Vinir – a Kaim'era and the father of Zatar
- Yiril – a Kaim'era and part of the trio alliances, with Vinir and Sechaveh and then with Zatar and Sechaveh.
- Darmel lyu Tukone – the father of Anzha lyu Metethe

== Groups ==
- Braxins – a human, space-faring society that is stratified, patriarchal, sexually dimorphous, racially disparate, and polygamous. They rule over a region of space called the Holding.
- Azeans – a human, space-faring society that created and now preserves racial uniformity (golden skin and white hair), male and female equality (both in body size and societal power), and monogamous pair-bonding—all through genetic manipulation. They rule over a region of space called the Star Empire, which borders the Holding.
- Braxaná – once an isolated, spartan, warrior tribe of pale-skinned, dark-haired Braxins, they have become the highest caste in Braxin society.
- Kaim'era – a member of the ruling oligarchy of Braxin society. A Kaim'era has the right to kill a commoner at any time for any reason and is not required to state the reason.
