= Ditmar Award results =

Results of Australian science fiction, fantasy and horror award

The Ditmar Award is Australia's oldest science fiction, fantasy and horror award, presented annually since 1969, usually at the Australian "Natcon". The historical nominations and results (listed in boldface) of the Award follow.

== 1969: Eighth Australian Science Fiction Convention, Melbourne ==
=== Best Australian Science Fiction of any length, or collection ===
- Pacific Book Of Australian SF, John Baxter
- **False Fatherland, A. Bertram Chandler**
- "Final Flower", Stephen Cook

=== Best International Science Fiction of any length, or collection ===
- An Age, Brian Aldiss
- **Camp Concentration, Thomas M. Disch**
- The Ring of Ritornel, Charles Harness

=== Best Contemporary Writer of Science Fiction ===
- **Brian Aldiss**
- R.A. Lafferty
- Samuel R. Delany
- Roger Zelazny

=== Best Australian Amateur Science Fiction Publication or Fanzine ===
- **Australian Science Fiction Review, John Bangsund**
- The Mentor, Ronald L Clarke
- Rataplan, Leigh Edmonds

== 1970: Ninth Australian Science Fiction Convention, Melbourne ==
=== Best Australian Science Fiction ===
- **"Dancing Gerontius", Lee Harding**
- "Anchor Man", Jack Wodhams
- "Split Personality", Jack Wodhams
- "The Kinsolving's Planet Irregulars", A. Bertram Chandler

=== Best International Publication ===
- Amazing Stories
- **Vision of Tomorrow**

=== Best International Fiction ===
- The Left Hand of Darkness, Ursula K. Le Guin
- **Cosmicomics, Italo Calvino**

=== Best Australian Fanzine ===
- S.F. Commentary, Bruce Gillespie
- **The Journal of Omphalistic Epistemology, John Foyster**

== 1971: Tenth Australian Science Fiction Convention, Melbourne ==
=== Best Australian SF ===
- After Ragnarok, Robert Bowden
- **"The Bitter Pill", A. Bertram Chandler**
- Squat, David Rome

=== Best International Fiction ===
- Time and the Hunter, Italo Calvino
- "The Region Between", Harlan Ellison
- Tower of Glass, Robert Silverberg
- **No Award**

=== Best Australian Fanzine ===
- S.F. Commentary, Bruce Gillespie
- **The Somerset Gazette, Noel Kerr**
- The New Forerunner, Gary Mason

=== Special awards ===
- **Science Fiction in the Cinema, John Baxter**
- **Vision of Tomorrow, Ron Graham**

== 1972: Syncon 2, Sydney ==
=== Best Australian Fiction ===
- "What You Know", A. Bertram Chandler
- **"Fallen Spaceman", Lee Harding**
- "The Immortal", Olaf Ruhen
- "The Man Of Slow Feeling", Michael Wilding
- The Authentic Touch, Jack Wodhams

=== Best International Fiction ===
- To Your Scattered Bodies Go, Philip José Farmer
- "Continued On Next Rock", R.A. Lafferty
- The Lathe of Heaven, Ursula K. Le Guin
- **Ringworld, Larry Niven**
- A Time of Changes, Robert Silverberg

=== Best Australian Fanzine ===
- Scythrop, John Bangsund
- The Mentor, Ron L. Clarke
- The Fanarchist, David Grigg
- Chao, John Alderson
- **S.F. Commentary, Bruce Gillespie**

== 1973: Advention 2, Adelaide ==
=== Best Australian Fiction ===
- The Hard Way Up, A. Bertram Chandler
- **"Let it Ring", John Ossian (John Foyster)**
- "Gone Fishing", David Rome
- "Budnip", Jack Wodhams

=== Best International Fiction ===
- **The Gods Themselves, Isaac Asimov**
- The Gorgon Festival, John Boyd
- The IQ Merchant, John Boyd
- Dying Inside, Robert Silverberg

=== Best Dramatic Presentation ===
- **Aussiefan**
- A Clockwork Orange
- Slaughterhouse Five
- Tales From The Crypt

=== Best Australian Fanzine ===
- Chao, John Alderson
- Gegenschein, Eric Lindsay
- Rataplan, Leigh Edmonds
- **S.F. Commentary, Bruce Gillespie**

== 1974: Ozcon, Melbourne ==
(The programme book for the 1990 Natcon, Danse Macabre, records that no Ditmar Awards were presented in 1974.)

== 1975: Syncon '75, Sydney ==
=== Best Australian SF ===
- **The Bitter Pill, A. Bertram Chandler**
- The Soft Kill, Colin Free
- "The Ark of James Carlyle", Cherry Wilder

=== Best International Fiction ===
- **Protector, Larry Niven**
- The Dispossessed, Ursula K. Le Guin
- Frankenstein Unbound, Brian Aldiss

=== Best Australian Fanzine ===
- **Osiris, Del & Dennis Stocks**
- Forerunner, Sue Clarke
- Fanew Sletter, Leigh Edmonds
- Chao, John Alderson
- Gegenschein, Eric Lindsay

== 1976: Bofcon, Melbourne ==
=== Best Australian Fiction ===
- **The Big Black Mark, A. Bertram Chandler**
- "Way Out West", Cherry Wilder
- The Frozen Sky, Lee Harding (ruled ineligible, because published in 1976)

=== Best International Fiction ===
- The Indian Giver, Alfred Bester
- The Shockwave Rider, John Brunner
- **The Forever War, Joe Haldeman**
- Inferno, Larry Niven & Jerry Pournelle
- "Down to a Sunless Sea", Cordwainer Smith

=== Best Australian Fanzine ===
- Chao, John Alderson
- **Fanew Sletter, Leigh Edmonds**
- Mad Dan's Review, Marc Ortlieb
- Osiris, Del & Dennis Stocks
- Interstellar Ramjet Scoop, Bill Wright

=== William Atheling Jr Award ===
- Algis Budrys, "Foundation & Asimov"
- James Gunn, Alternative Worlds
- David Ketterer, New Worlds For Old
- **George Turner, "Paradigm and Pattern; Form and Meaning in "The Dispossessed""**
- George Turner, "Philip Dick by 1975"

== 1977: A-Con 7, Adelaide ==
=== Best Australian Science Fiction ===
- "The Ins and Outs of the Hadhya City State", Phillipa Maddern
- Kelly Country, A. Bertram Chandler
- Future Sanctuary, Lee Harding
- **Walkers on the Sky, David Lake**

=== Best International Fiction ===
- A World Out of Time, Larry Niven
- **The Space Machine, Christopher Priest**
- The Hand of Oberon, Roger Zelazny
- "Piper at the Gates of Dawn", Richard Cowper

=== Best Australian Fanzine ===
- **S.F. Commentary, Bruce Gillespie**
- Mad Dan's Review, Marc Ortlieb
- Enigma, Van Ikin
- South of Harad, East of Rhun, Jon Noble

=== William Atheling Award ===
- George Turner, "Theme as an Element of Fiction"
- **George Turner, "The Jonah Kit"**
- George Turner & Peter Nicholls, "Plumbers of the Cosmos"

=== Special committee award ===
- **"The Ins and Outs of the Hadhya City State", Phillipa Maddern**

== 1978: Unicon IV, Melbourne ==
=== Australian Science Fiction, Best Novel ===
- The Right Hand of Dextra, David Lake
- The Wildings of Westron, David Lake
- The Weeping Sky, Lee Harding
- **The Luck of Brin's Five, Cherry Wilder**

=== Australian Science Fiction, Best Short Fiction ===
- **"Albert's Bellyful", Francis Payne (Yggdrasil, Feb '77)**
- "Ignorant of Magic", Phillipa C. Maddern (View From The Edge)
- "The Two Body Problem", Bruce Barnes (View From The Edge)
- "The Long Fall", A. Bertram Chandler (Amazing, July '77)

=== Best International Fiction ===
- In the Hall Of the Martian Kings, John Varley, F&SF, Feb '77
- **The Silmarillion, J. R. R. Tolkien (Allen & Unwin)**
- Our Lady Of Darkness, (aka The Pale Brown Thing) Fritz Leiber, (Berkeley Putnam/F&SF, Jan February 77)
- A Dream of Wessex, Chris Priest (Faber)
- "The House of Compassionate Sharers", Michael Bishop (Cosmos No 1)
- The Silver in the Tree, Susan Cooper (Chatto & Windus)
- Gateway, Frederik Pohl (Gollancz or Ballantine)

=== Best Amateur Australian Publication (Fanzine) ===
- Yggdrasil, Dennis Callegari & Alan Wilson
- **Enigma, Van Ikin**
- Minardor, Marc Ortlieb
- Fanew Sletter, Leigh Edmonds
- Epsilon Eridani Express, Neville J. Angove

=== William Atheling Jr Award ===
- George Turner, "The Martial Art of SF Criticism", Yggdrasil, Feb, May & August 1977
- **Andrew Whitmore, "The Novels of D.G. Compton", SF Commentary, No 52.**
- Robert Scholes & Eric S. Rabkin, Science Fiction: History Science Vision, O.U.P
- George Turner, "The Silverberg Phenomenon", SF Commentary, No 51
- Van Ikin, Review of 'Going'

== 1979: Syncon '79, Sydney ==
=== Best Australian Fiction ===
- To Keep The Ship, A. Bertram Chandler (DAW)
- **Beloved Son, George Turner (Faber)**
- Play Little Victims, Kenneth Cook (Pergamon Press)
- "Pie Row Joe", Kevin McKay, Rooms of Paradise (Quartet)

=== Best International Fiction ===
- The Far Call, Gordon R. Dickson (Quantum)
- Dreamsnake, Vonda McIntyre (Houghton & Mifflin)
- Stardance II, Spider and Jeanne Robinson, Analog, Sept to November 1978
- "The Persistence of Vision", John Varley, F&SF, March 1978
- **The White Dragon, Anne McCaffrey**

=== Best Australian Fanzine ===
- Forerunner, Jack R. Herman
- Yggdrasil, Dennis Callegari & Alan Wilson
- Scytale, Peter Toluzzi
- The Epsilon Eridani Express, Neville J. Angove
- **Chunder!, John Foyster**

=== Best Australian Fanwriter ===
- Leanne Frahm
- John Bangsund
- **Marc Ortlieb**
- Anthony Peacy
- Eric Lindsay
- John Foyster

=== William Atheling Jr Award ===
- **Susan Wood, "Women and Science Fiction", Algol 33, 1978**
- John Bangsund, Parergon Papers 10, ANZAPA, October 1978
- John McPharlin, "On The Ebb Tide of the New Wave", Auto Delerium, March 1978
- Lloyd Biggle Jr, "The Morasses of Academe Revisited", Analog, September 1978

== 1980: Swancon 5, Perth ==
=== Australian fiction ===
- Moon in the Ground, Keith Antill
- Displaced Person, Lee Harding
- **Australian Gnomes, Robert Ingpen**
- "One Clay Foot", Jack Wodhams

=== Best International Fiction ===
- **The Hitch-Hiker's Guide to the Galaxy, Douglas Adams**
- Castle Roogna, Piers Anthony
- The Flight of Dragons, Peter Dickinson
- Dragondrums, Anne McCaffrey
- Titan, John Varley

=== Best Australian Fanzine ===
- Bionic Rabbit, Damian Brennan
- The Wasffan, Roy Ferguson
- Chunder, John Foyster
- **S.F. Commentary, Bruce Gillespie**
- Forerunner, Jack Herman

=== Best Australian Fan Writer ===
- Damian Brennan
- Roy Ferguson
- **Leanne Frahm**
- Jack R. Herman
- Marc Ortlieb

=== Best Australian SF or Fantasy Artist ===
- Bevan Casey
- Chris Johnston
- Rob McGough
- John Packer
- **Marilyn Pride**
- Jane Taubman

=== William Atheling Award for Criticism in SF or Fantasy ===
- Terry Dowling, "The Art of Xenography", Science Fiction 3
- Bruce Gillespie, "The Man Who Filled the Void" & "By Our Fruits", S.F. Commentary 55/56
- **Jack R. Herman, "Paradox as a Paradigm: A Review of Thomas Covenant the Unbeliever by Stephen Donaldson", Forerunner, May 1979**
- George Turner, "Delany: A Victim of the Great Applause", Yggdrasil 3/79

== 1981: Advention '81, Adelaide ==
=== Best Australian Novel ===
- **The Dreaming Dragons, Damien Broderick**
- Breathing Space Only, Wynne Whiteford
- Looking for Blucher, Jack Wodhams
- The Fourth Hemisphere, David Lake

=== Best Australian Short Fiction ===
- **"Deus Ex Corporus", Leanne Frahm**
- "The Pastseer", Phillipa Maddern
- "Passage to Earth", Leanne Frahm
- "Horg", Jay Hoffman

=== Best International Fiction ===
- Mockingbird, Walter Tevis
- The Snow Queen, Joan D. Vinge
- **Timescape, Gregory Benford**
- The Wounded Land, Stephen R. Donaldson

=== Best Australian Fanzine ===
- Australian Science Fiction News, Mervyn R. Binns
- **Q36, Marc Ortlieb**
- Chunder, John Foyster
- S.F. Commentary, Bruce Gillespie

=== Best Australian Fanwriter ===
- Leigh Edmonds
- Leanne Frahm
- David Grigg
- **Marc Ortlieb**

=== Best Australian SF or Fantasy Artist ===
- John Packer
- **Marilyn Pride**
- Jane Taubman
- Julie Vaux

=== William Atheling Jr Award ===
- Algis Budrys, "Charting Paradise"
- Christopher Priest, "Outside the Whale"
- John Sladek, "Four Reasons for Reading Thomas M. Disch"
- **George Turner, "Frederik Pohl as a Creator of Future Societies", and "Samuel Delany: Victim of Great Applause"**

== 1982: Tschaicon, Melbourne ==
(The Australian newszine Thyme records that Tschaicon was the "First Australasian Science Fiction Convention", the relevant constitution having had "Australian" replaced with "Australasian" throughout; that the award categories used "Australasian" rather than "Australian"; and that the constitution was modified, at Tschaicon, to have "Australasian" changed back to "Australian".)

There was an award from the committee, in the form of a miniature Ditmar Award, to Marc Ortlieb for Best Toastmastering.

=== Best Long Australasian Science Fiction or Fantasy ===
- The Anarch Lords, A. Bertram Chandler
- Bard, Keith Taylor
- Behind the Wind, Patricia Wrightson
- City of Women, David Ireland
- **The Man Who Loved Morlocks, David Lake**

=== Best Short Australasian Science Fiction or Fantasy ===
- Armstrong, Jack Wodhams
- Tales of Mirric, Elizabeth Travers
- **Where Silence Rules, Keith Taylor**

=== Best International Fiction ===
- **The Affirmation, Chris Priest**
- The Claw of the Conciliator, Gene Wolfe
- Radix, A.A. Attanasio
- The Sirian Experiments, Doris Lessing

=== Best Australasian Fanzine ===
- Australian SF News, ed. Merv Binns
- **Q36, ed. Marc Ortlieb**
- S.F. Commentary, ed. Bruce Gillespie
- Thyme, ed. Andrew Brown and Irwin Hirsh
- Weberwoman's Wrevenge, ed. Jean Weber

=== Best Australasian Fan Writer ===
- Leigh Edmonds
- Judith Hanna
- Eric Lindsay
- **Marc Ortlieb**

=== Best Australasian SF or Fantasy Artist ===
- Steph Campbell
- Chris Johnston
- John Packer
- **Marilyn Pride**

=== William Atheling Award ===
- Damien Broderick, "The Lately Great Alfred Bester", S.F. Commentary 62–66
- Thomas Disch, "The Labor Day Group" F&SF, February 1981
- **Bruce Gillespie, "Sing a Song of Daniel", S.F. Commentary 62–66**

== 1983: Syncon '83, Sydney ==
=== Best Australian Science Fiction or Fantasy ===
- **"The Man Who Walks Away Behind the Eyes", Terry Dowling, Omega, May 1982**
- The Lances of Nengesdul, Keith Taylor
- Vaneglory, George Turner

=== Best International Science Fiction or Fantasy ===
- No Enemy But Time, Michael Bishop
- The One Tree, Stephen R. Donaldson
- **Ridley Walker, Russell Hoban**
- Roderick, John Sladek

=== Best Australian Fanzine ===
- Ornithopter, Leigh Edmonds
- **Q36, Marc Ortlieb**
- Science Fiction, Van Ikin
- Thyme, eds. Andrew Brown & Irwin Hirsh; ed. Roger Weddall
- Weberwoman's Wrevenge, Jean Weber

=== Best Australian Fanwriter ===
- Terry Dowling
- Leigh Edmonds
- **Marc Ortlieb**

=== Best Australian SF or Fantasy Artist ===
- Kerrie Hanlon
- Chris Johnston
- **Marilyn Pride**
- Nick Stathopoulos

=== Best Australian SF or Fantasy Cartoonist ===
- Terry Frost
- Michael McGann
- **John Packer**
- Jane Taubman
- Julie Vaux

=== Best Australian SF or Fantasy Editor ===
- Neville Angove
- Mervyn Binns
- Ron L. Clarke
- Paul Collins
- **Van Ikin**
- Norstrilia Press

=== William Atheling Award (for critical writings) ===
- **Terry Dowling, "Kirth Gersen: The Other Demon Prince", Science Fiction 11**
- Terry Dowling, "The Lever of Life: Winning and Losing in the Fiction of Cordwainer Smith", Science Fiction 10
- Bruce Gillespie, S.F. Commentary: The First Year, Bruce Gillespie

=== Special Award ===
- **Robin Johnson, Contribution to Fandom**

== 1984: Eureka!con, Melbourne ==
There were insufficient nominations for the William Atheling Jr Award.

=== Best Australian Long Science Fiction or Fantasy ===
- The Tempting of the Witch King, Russell Blackford (Cory & Collins)
- The Judas Mandala, Damien Broderick (Timescape)
- Valencies, Damien Broderick & Rory Barnes (University of Queensland Press)
- Kelly Country, Bertram Chandler (Penguin)
- **Yesterday's Men, George Turner, (Faber)**
- Thor's Hammer, Wynne Whiteford (Cory & Collins)

=== Best Australian Short Science Fiction or Fantasy ===
- "Crystal Soldier", Russell Blackford (Dreamworks, ed. David King, Norstrilia Press)
- "Life the Solitude", Kevin McKay (Dreamworks, ed. David King, Norstrilia Press)
- "Land Deal", Gerald Murnane (Dreamworks, ed. David King, Norstrilia Press)
- **"Above Atlas His Shoulders", Andrew Whitmore** (Dreamworks, ed. David King, Norstrilia Press)

=== Best International Fiction ===
- The Birth of the People's Republic of Antarctica, John Calvin Batchelor (Dial Press)
- The Tempting of the Witch King, Russell Blackford (Cory and Collins)
- Dr Who (BBC)
- Pilgerman, Russell Hoban (Jonathan Cape)
- Yesterday's Men, George Turner (Faber)
- Thor's Hammer, Wynne Whiteford (Cory & Collins)
- **No Award**

=== Best Australian Fanzine ===
- Australian Science Fiction News, Merv Binns
- **Rataplan/Ornithopter, Leigh Edmonds**
- Science Fiction, Van Ikin
- Thyme, Roger Weddall
- Wahf-full, Jack Herman

=== Best Australian Fanwriter ===
- **Leigh Edmonds**
- Terry Frost
- Jack Herman
- Seth Lockwood

=== Best Australian SF or Fantasy Artist ===
- Neville Bain
- Steph Campbell
- Mike Dutkiewicz
- Chris Johnston
- **Nick Stathopoulos**

=== Best Australian SF or Fantasy Cartoonist ===
- Bill Flowers
- Terry Frost
- Craig Hilton
- Mike McGann
- **John Packer**
- Clint Strickland

=== Best Australian SF or Fantasy Editor ===
- Paul Collins
- **Van Ikin**
- David King
- Norstrilia Press - Bruce Gillespie, Carey Handfield and Rob Gerrand

== 1985: Advention '85, Adelaide ==
The awards ceremony included presentation of the A. Bertram Chandler Award to Lee Harding, and another three special awards to Damien Broderick, for Transmitters; John Foyster, for past work in fandom; and the Nova Mob, for going on for a long time.(The A. Bertram Chandler Award is a separate award.)

=== Best Australian Novel ===
- **The Beast of Heaven, Victor Kelleher**
- The Last Amazon, A. Bertram Chandler
- The Wild Ones, A. Bertram Chandler
- Suburbs of Hell, Randolph Stow

=== Best Australian Short Fiction ===
- **"Terrarium", Terry Dowling, Omega, May/June 1984**
- "The Maze Man", Terry Dowling, Men's Journal, Summer 1984
- "Resurrection", Damien Broderick, IASFM, August 1984
- "Three Star Trek", Ron Ferguson, Omega, Sept/October 1984

=== Best International Fiction ===
- **Neuromancer, William Gibson (Ace)**
- The Final Encyclopedia, Gordon R. Dickson (Tor)
- Native Tongues, Suzette Haden Elgin, (DAW)
- Damiano's Lute, R.A. MacAvoy (Bantam)

=== Best Australian Fanzine ===
- **Australian SF News, Merv Binns**
- The Mentor, Ron L. Clarke
- Rataplan, Leigh Edmonds
- Science Fiction, Van Ikin

=== Best Australian Fanwriter ===
- **Leigh Edmonds**
- David Grigg
- Leanne Frahm
- Yvonne Rousseau

=== Best Australian SF or Fantasy Artist, Cartoonist or Illustrator ===
- **Nick Stathopoulos**
- Craig Hilton
- Kerrie Hanlon
- Peter Reading

=== Best Australian SF or Fantasy Editor ===
- Paul Collins
- Van Ikin
- Philip Gore
- **Bruce Gillespie**

=== Best Australian SF or Fantasy Dramatic Presentation ===
- Boiling Frog, Stage play with productions in Adelaide & Sydney
- Beach Blanket Tempest, Rock Fantasy stage musical (Half Moon Production)
- Iceman, Fred Schepisi Director
- Iceman, Bruce Smeaton Musical score
- Thief of Sydney, Animated feature 15 minutes
- **Kindred Spirits, ABC Telemovie**

=== William Atheling Jr Award ===
- **George Turner, In The Heart or in the Head**
- John Foyster, Article on George Turner, ASFN 1984
- Damien Broderick, SF Reviews, The Age, 1984
- John Baxter, SF Reviews, The Australian, 1984

== 1986: Swancon XI, Perth ==
=== Best Australian Science Fiction Novel ===
- Landscape With Landscapes, Gerald Murnane (Norstrilia)
- **Illywhacker, Peter Carey (UQP)**
- The Changelings of Chaan, David Lake (Hyland House)
- The Transing Syndrome, Kurt von Trojan (Rigby)

=== Best Australian Short Fiction ===
- "The Twist of Fate", David Grigg, Urban Fantasies
- "Glass Reptile Breakout", Russell Blackford, Strange Attractors/Omega
- "Montage", Lucy Sussex, Urban Fantasies
- "The Fittest", George Turner, Urban Fantasies
- "The Lipton Village Society", Lucy Sussex, Strange Attractors
- **"The Bullet That Grows in the Gun", Terry Dowling, Urban Fantasies**

=== Best International Fiction ===
- Devil in a Forest, Gene Wolfe (Granada)
- Tik Tok, John Sladek (Corgi)
- Free Live Free, Gene Wolfe (Gollancz)
- Peace, Gene Wolfe (Chatto)
- **The Compass Rose, Ursula K. Le Guin (Bantam, also Underwood & Miller, and Harper and Row)**
- Elleander Morning, Jerry Yulsman (Orbit/Futura)

=== Best Australian Fanzine ===
- The Notional, Leigh Edmonds
- **The Metaphysical Review, Bruce Gillespie**
- Thyme, Roger Weddall & Peter Burns
- Tigger, Marc Ortlieb
- Sikander, Irwin Hirsh

=== Best Australian Fanwriter ===
- Bruce Gillespie
- Damien Broderick
- **Leigh Edmonds**
- Yvonne Rousseau
- Marc Ortlieb

=== Best Australian SF or Fantasy Artist ===
- Lewis Morley
- John Packer
- Betty de Gabrielle
- **Nick Stathopoulos**
- Marilyn Pride
- Craig Hilton

=== William Atheling Jr Award ===
- Norman Talbot
- Russell Blackford
- **George Turner, "Neuromancer et al."**
- Yvonne Rousseau

== 1987: Capcon, Canberra ==
=== Best Australian Science Fiction or Fantasy Novel ===
- **Bard III: The Wild Sea, Keith Taylor (Ace)**
- "Oasis", Patrick Urth, Aphelion 1-4
- Taronga, Victor Kelleher (Viking Kestrel)
- The Black Grail, Damien Broderick (Avon)
- Adventures Of Christian Rosy Cross, David Foster (Penguin)

=== Best Australian Science Fiction or Fantasy Short Fiction ===
- "Shut the Door When You Go Out", George Turner, Aphelion 4
- **"The Man Who Lost Red", Terry Dowling**
- "Time of the Star", Terry Dowling, Aphelion 3
- "A Dragon Between His Fingers", Terry Dowling, Omega, May/June
- "For the Man Who Has Everything", Chris Simmons, Aphelion 1

=== Best Australian Fanzine ===
- The Space Wastrel, Mark Loney, Michelle Muijsert, Julian Warner
- Motional, Anonymous
- Larrikin, Irwin Hirsh & Perry Middlemiss
- Metaphysical Review, Bruce Gillespie
- **Thyme, Roger Weddall and Peter Burns**

=== Best Australian SF or Fantasy Artist ===
- **Craig Hilton**
- Nick Stathopoulos
- Kerrie Hanlon
- Betty deGabriele
- John Packer

=== Outstanding Contribution to Australian Fandom ===
- **Carey Handfield, T.R.O. (The Real Official.)**
- Jessica Aldridge
- Peter McNamara
- Michelle Muijsert
- John Foyster

=== William Atheling Jr Award for Criticism or Review ===
- **Russell Blackford, "Debased and Lascivious"**
- Dave Luckett
- Margaret Winch, "Frank's Tank"
- Michael J Tolley

== 1988: Conviction, Sydney ==
=== Best Australian Long Fiction ===
- **For As Long As You Burn, Terry Dowling, Aphelion 5**
- The Makers, Victor Kelleher (Viking, Kestrel)
- Bard IV: Raven's Gathering, Keith Taylor (Ace)
- The Sea and the Summer, George Turner (Faber)
- The Hyades Contact, Wynne Whiteford (Ace)

=== Best Australian Short Fiction ===
- The Dirty Little Unicorn, Stephen Dedman
- **"The Last Elephant", Terry Dowling, Australian Short Stories #20**
- "Marmordesse", Terry Dowling, Omega, January 1987
- "The Supramarket", Leanne Frahm, Doom City
- "The Celestial Intervention Agency", Karen Herkes, Time Loop #70

=== Best Australian Fanzine ===
- Australian Science Fiction Review, Melbourne Collective eds
- Larrikin, Irwin Hirsh, Perry Middlemiss
- **Science Fiction, Van Ikin**
- The Space Wastrel, Mark Loney, Michelle Muijsert, Julian Warner

=== Best Australian Fan Writer ===
- Karen Herkes
- Jack R. Herman
- Irwin Hirsh
- Van Ikin
- **Perry Middlemiss**

=== Best Fan Artist ===
- Donna Angus
- Kerrie Hanlon
- Craig Hilton
- David Kenyon
- Stephen McArthur
- **Lewis Morley**

=== William Atheling Jr Award for Criticism or Review ===
- Russell Blackford, "Deconstructing the Demon: John Calvin Bachelor's Novels" ASFR #11
- Richard Erlich & Peter Hall, "A Prefilmic, Post-Poststructurialist Prostruction of Alien/Alien3", ASFR #11
- John Foyster, Review of Trillion Year Spree, ASFR #7
- **Van Ikin, "Mirror Reversals and the Tolkien Writing Game", Science Fiction #25**
- Susan Margaret, "Structural Analysis of SF. Why?", The Space Wastrel
- Janeen Webb, "I Know Who I am, But What is my Brand Name?"

== 1989: Swancon 14, Perth ==
=== Best Australian Long Fiction ===
- **Striped Holes, Damien Broderick (Avon)**
- West of the Moon, David Lake (Hyland)
- Huaco of the Golden God, Carolyn Logan (A&R)
- Beyond The Labyrinth, Gillian Rubinstein, (Hyland)

=== Best Australian Short Fiction ===
- "A Tale of Nine Cats", Katherine Cummings, Conviction Programme
- "Scatter My Ashes", Greg Egan, Interzone #23
- "Things fall apart", Philippa Maddern, Matilda at the Speed of Light
- "The Colors of the Masters", Sean McMullen, F&SF March 1988
- **"My Lady Tongue", Lucy Sussex, Matilda at the Speed of Light**

=== Best International Fiction ===
- Dawn, Octavia Butler (Gollancz)
- **Seventh Son, Orson Scott Card (Legend)**
- Aegypt, John Crowley (Gollancz)
- Mona Lisa Overdrive, William Gibson (Gollancz)
- On Stranger Tides, Tim Powers (Grafton)
- Life During Wartime, Lucius Shepard (Grafton)
- Islands in the Net, Bruce Sterling (Century)

=== Best Australian Fanzine ===
- SFR, SF Collective
- **Get Stuffed, Jacob Blake**
- Larrikin, Perry Middlemiss & Irwin Hirsh
- Science Fiction, Van Ikin

=== Best Australian Fanwriter ===
- **Bruce Gillespie**
- Jack Herman
- Van Ikin
- Perry Middlemiss

=== Best Fan Artist ===
- **Ian Gunn** (Get Stuffed, Australian Playbeing, etc.)
- Kerrie Hanlon (Conviction Programme, T-shirt, etc.)
- Craig Hilton (Larrikin, Thyme, etc.)
- Mike McGann (Get Stuffed, mediazines, etc.)
- Kiera McKenzie (Australian Realms)
- Phil Wlodarczyk (Get Stuffed, Ethel the Aardvark, etc.)

=== William Atheling Jr Award ===
- **Russell Blackford, ASFR articles**
- Martin Bridgstock, "Sea & Summer" (ASFR), and "Counter Earth/Counter Humanity" (Metaphysical Review)
- Janeen Webb, ASFR articles
- Arthur Webster, "Speaker for the Dead" (Get Stuffed)

== 1990: Danse Macabre, Melbourne ==
The William Atheling Jr Award for Criticism or Review was withdrawn due to insufficient nominations.

=== Best Australian Long Fiction ===
- Victor Kelleher, The Red King (Viking Kestrel)
- Keith Taylor, The Sorcerer's Sacred Isle (Ace)
- **Wynne Whiteford, Lake of the Sun (Ace)**

=== Best Australian Short Fiction ===
- **Terry Dowling, "The Quiet Redemption of Andy the House", Australian Short Stories #26 (June 1989)**
- Rosaleen Love, "If You Go Down to the Park Today", Total Devotion Machine (Women's Press)
- Rosaleen Love, "Total Devotion Machine", Total Devotion Machine(Women's Press)
- Petrina Smith, "Over the Edge", Mirrors: Redress Novellas (Women's Redress Press)

=== Best Australian Fanzine ===
- SF Collective, ASFR
- **Melbourne Science Fiction Club, Ethel The Aardvark (ed. Alan Stewart)**
- Jacob Blake, Get Stuffed
- Jack R. Herman, Sweetness and Light

=== Best Australian Fanwriter ===
- Terry Frost
- **Bruce Gillespie**
- **Ian Gunn**
- Jack Herman
- Yvonne Hintz
- Alan Stewart

=== Best Fan Artist ===
- **Ian Gunn**
- Kerrie Hanlon
- Craig Hilton
- Phil Wlodarczyk

== 1991: Suncon, Brisbane ==
=== Best Fannish Cat ===
- Apple Blossom, humans: Elaine Cochrane & Bruce Gillespie
- Constantinople, human: Phil Wlodarczyk
- Emma Peel, human: Terry Frost
- Godzilla, humans: Ian Gunn & Karen Pender-Gunn
- Honey, humans: Gerald [Smith] & Womble
- Satan, human: Phil Wlodarczyk
- Truffle, humans: Mark Loney & Michelle Muijsert
- **Typo, human: Roger Weddall**

=== Best Fanzine ===
- **Australian Science Fiction Review, (Second series), edited by the Science Fiction Collective**
- Doxa!, Roman Orszanski
- Doxy, John Foyster
- Ethel the Aardvark, Alan Stewart
- Pink, Karen Pender-Gunn
- StunGunn, Ian Gunn

=== Best Australian Novel or Anthology ===
- A Pursuit of Miracles, George Turner(Aphelion Press)
- Fortress of Eternity, Andrew Whitmore (Avon Books)
- My Lady Tongue and Other Tales, Lucy Sussex (William Heinemann)
- **Rynosseros, Terry Dowling (Aphelion Press)**
- The Specialist, Wynne Whiteford (Ace)

=== Best Australian Short Fiction ===
- "Generation Gap", George Turner, A Pursuit of Miracles (Aphelion)
- "God and Her Black Sense of Humour", Lucy Sussex, My Lady Tongue and Other Tales (William Heinemann)
- "Red Ochre", Lucy Sussex, My Lady Tongue and Other Tales (William Heinemann)
- "The Caress", Greg Egan, Isaac Asimov's SF Magazine January 1990
- "Turtle Soup", Rosaleen Love, Eidolon 3, December 1990
- **"While the Gate is Open", Sean McMullen, F&SF February 1990**

=== Best Australian Fan Artist ===
- **Ian Gunn**
- Craig Hilton
- Marion Plumridge
- Phil Wlodarczyk

=== Best Australian Fan Writer ===
- Terry Frost
- **Bruce Gillespie**
- Ian Gunn
- Marc Ortlieb
- Alan Stewart

=== William Atheling Jr Award ===
- Russell Blackford, "Analogues of Anomie: Lee Harding's Novels" in Science Fiction 30 & Australian Science Fiction Review (Second Series)
- **Bruce Gillespie, "The Non-SF Novels of Philip K. Dick", ANZAPA 136, October 1990**
- Peter Nicholls, "Fantastic World" reviews in the Melbourne Sunday Herald
- Alan Stewart, Reviews in Ethel the Aardvark and SF Commentary

== 1992: Syncon, Sydney ==
The awards ceremony included presentation of five special awards from the Syncon committee to Jack R. Herman, Eric B. Lindsay, Ron Clarke, Sue Clarke, and Shayne McCormack.

=== Best Novel or Collection ===
- From Sea to Shining Star, A. Bertram Chandler
- **Wormwood, Terry Dowling**
- Brother Night, Victor Kelleher
- Del-Del, Victor Kelleher
- Brainchild, George Turner

=== Best Short Fiction ===
- "Vanities", Terry Dowling
- "Nobody's Fool", Terry Dowling
- "A Deadly Edge Their Red Beaks Pass Along", Terry Dowling
- "Olive Truffles", Leanne Frahm
- "The Dominant Style", Sean McMullen
- **"Alone in his Chariot", Sean McMullen (Eidolon)**

=== Best Fanzine ===
- **Eidolon, ed Jonathan Strahan, Richard Scriven and Jeremy Byrne**
- Ethel the Aardvark, Alan Stewart
- Inconsequential Parallax, Tim Richards & Narrelle Harris
- Thyme, LynC & Clive Newall
- Thyme, Greg Hills & Mark Loney

=== Best Fan Writer ===
- James Allen
- Terry Frost
- **Bruce Gillespie**
- Greg Hills
- Alan Stewart

=== Best Artist ===
- Ian Gunn
- Craig Hilton
- **Nick Stathopoulos**
- Phil Wlodarczyk

=== William Atheling Jr Award for Criticism or Review ===
- "Jonathan Carroll, Storyteller", Bruce Gillespie
- **"Going Commercial", Sean McMullen (Eidolon 6)**
- Review of The Fantastic Civil War, Blair Ramage

== 1993: Swancon 18, Perth ==
=== Best Long Fiction ===
- Blue Tyson, Terry Dowling
- **Quarantine, Greg Egan**
- Back Door Man, Ian M. Hails
- Call to the Edge, Sean McMullen
- Brainchild, George Turner
- And Disregards the Rest, Paul Voermans

=== Best Short Fiction ===
- "Privateer's Moon", Terry Dowling (Blue Tyson)
- "Ship's Eye", Terry Dowling (Eidolon 8)
- **"Closer", Greg Egan (Eidolon 9)**
- "Worthless", Greg Egan (In Dreams)
- "The Seas of Castle Hill Road", Rick Kennett (Eidolon 9)
- "It's All in the Way You Look at It", Michael Pryor (Aurealis 10)

=== Best Periodical ===
- Slow Glass Books Catalog, Justin Ackroyd
- **Eidolon, Jeremy G. Byrne, Richard Scriven, Jonathan Strahan**
- Ethel the Aardvark, Alan Stewart
- Thyme, Alan Stewart
- Aurealis, Dirk Strasser & Stephen Higgins

=== Best Fan Writer ===
- Paul Ewings
- Terry Frost
- **Robin Pen**
- Karen Pender-Gunn
- Alan Stewart
- Roger Weddall

=== Best Artwork ===
- "Fanimals", Ian Gunn
- "Space Time Buccaneers", Ian Gunn (Inconsequential Parallax)
- 1992 Ditmar Award, Lewis Morley
- **Cover art for Blue Tyson, Nick Stathopoulos**
- "Relics", Shaun Tan (Eidolon 9)
- "Snowman", Leisl Yvette (Eidolon 9)

=== William Atheling Jr Award ===
- "Five Go Camping with 12.1 Club", Paul Ewins (Ethel the Aardvark 41)
- "James Morrow and the ERNI", Bruce Gillespie (Nova Mob, ANZAPA 148)
- **"Australian SF Art Turns 50", Sean McMullen (Eidolon 7)**
- "From Fantasy to Gallileo", Sean McMullen(Nova Mob, Eidolon 10)
- Reviews in Ethel the Aardvark, Karen Pender-Gunn

== 1994: Constantinople, Melbourne ==
=== Best Long Fiction or Collection ===
- **The Destiny Makers, George Turner**
- Graffiti, Dirk Strasser
- Twilight Beach, Terry Dowling
- The Weird Colonial Boy, Paul Voermans

=== Best Short Fiction ===
- **"Catalyst", Leanne Frahm, Terror Australis**
- "Starbaby", Rosaleen Love, Overland, December 93
- "The Lottery", Lucy Sussex, Overland, December 93
- "Ghosts of the Fall", Sean Williams, Writers of the Future IX

=== Best Professional Art Work ===
- Galaxy Bookshop Dragon, Lewis Morley
- **Twilight Beach Cover, Nick Stathopoulos**

=== Best Fan Writer ===
- Paul Ewins
- Terry Frost
- **Bruce Gillespie**
- Jan MacNally

=== Best Fan Artist ===
- Ian Gunn
- Craig Hilton
- Pamela Rendall
- Steve Scholz
- **Kerri Valkova**
- Phil Wlodarczyk

=== Best Fanzine ===
- Black Light
- **Ethel the Aardvark, Paul Ewins**
- Get Stuffed
- SF Commentary
- The Mentor
- Thyme

=== William Atheling Jr Award ===
- "Five Bikers of the Apocalypse", Leigh Edmonds, Eidolon #12
- **"SF Sucks", James Allen, Get Stuffed #6**
- "Silverberg Not Moving", Damien Broderick, SF Commentary 73/74/75

== 1995: Thylacon, Hobart ==
=== Best Australian Long Fiction ===
- Deersnake, Lucy Sussex (Hodder)
- Genetic Soldier, George Turner (William Morrow)
- **Permutation City, Greg Egan (Millennium)**
- Voices in the Light, Sean McMullen (Aphelion)

=== Best Australian Short Fiction ===
- **"Cocoon", Greg Egan, Asimov's SF, May 1994**
- "Jinx Ship", Leanne Frahm, The Patternmaker
- "Land's End", Leanne Frahm, Alien Shores
- "Our Lady of Chernobyl", Greg Egan, Interzone 83, May 1994
- "The Patternmaker", Dave Luckett, The Patternmaker

=== Best Professional Artwork ===
- **Shaun Tan, for artwork in Aurealis and Eidolon**

=== Best Fanzine ===
- Gegenschein, Eric Lindsay
- The Mentor, Ron Clarke
- Sirius, Garry Wyatt
- **Thyme, Alan Stewart**

=== Best Fan Writer ===
- **Terry Frost**
- Ian Gunn
- Graham Stone

=== Best Fan Artist ===
- **Ian Gunn**
- Kerri Valkova

=== Special Committee Award ===
- **Peter Nicholls**

== 1996: Swancon 21, Perth ==
=== Best Long Fiction ===
- An Intimate Knowledge of the Night, Terry Dowling (Aphelion)
- **Mirrorsun Rising, Sean McMullen (Aphelion)**
- Sabriel, Garth Nix (Moonstone/HarperCollins)
- She's Fantastical, Lucy Sussex & Judith Buckrich (Sybylla)
- The Unknown Soldier, Sean Williams & Shane Dix (Aphelion)

=== Best Short Fiction ===
- "Entropy", Leanne Frahm, She's Fantastical (Sybylla)
- **"Schrödinger's Fridge", Ian Gunn, Aurealis #15**
- "A Sky Full of Ravens", Sue Isle, She's Fantastical (Sybylla)
- "Angel Thing", Petrina Smith, She's Fantastical (Sybylla)
- "A Map of the Mines of Barnath", Sean Williams, Eidolon #16, February 1995
- "The Perfect Gun", Sean Williams, Eidolon #17/18, June 1995

=== Best Publication/Fanzine (Periodical) ===
- **Eidolon, J. Byrne, R. Scriven & J. Strahan**
- Ethel the Aardvark, Paul Ewins
- The Metaphysical Review, Bruce Gillespie
- Pinkette, Karen Pender-Gunn
- Thyme, Alan Stewart

=== Best Artwork ===
- Thyme 106 (Cover), Ian Gunn
- An Intimate Knowledge of the Night (Cover), Nick Stathopoulos
- **Eidolon 19 (Cover), Shaun Tan**

=== Best Non-Professional/Fan Writer ===
- Terry Frost
- **Ian Gunn**
- Cheryl Morgan
- Alan Stewart

=== Best Non-Professional/Fan Artist ===
- **Ian Gunn**
- Steve Scholz
- Kerri Valkova

=== William Atheling Jnr Award ===
- Reading by Starlight, Damien Broderick (Routledge)
- **"The Hunt for Australian Horror Fiction", Bill Congreve, Sean McMullen & Steven Paulsen, The Scream Factory #16, November 1995**

== 1997: Basicon 2, Melbourne ==
=== Best Australian Long Fiction ===
- Dreamweavers, Paul Collins (ed) (Penguin Books)
- The Memory Cathedral, Jack Dann (Bantam)
- **Scarlet Rider, Lucy Sussex (Tor/Forge)**
- Metal Fatigue, Sean Williams (HarperCollins)

=== Best Australian Short Fiction ===
- **"The Sword of God", Russell Blackford, Dreamweavers**
- "The Ichneumon and the Dormeuse", Terry Dowling, Interzone #106
- "Borderline", Leanne Frahm, Borderline (MirrorDanse Books)
- The Stray Cat, Steven Paulsen (Lothian)

=== Best Fanzine ===
- The Communicator, Derek Screen
- Emerald City, Cheryl Morgan
- Oscillation Overthruster, Sue Ann Barber
- Pinkette, Karen Pender-Gunn
- Science Fiction, Van Ikin
- **Thyme, Alan Stewart**

=== Best Fan Writer ===
- Terry Frost
- **Bruce Gillespie**
- Ian Gunn
- Cheryl Morgan
- Karen Pender-Gunn

=== Best Fan Artist ===
- **Ian Gunn**
- Steve Scholz
- Kerri Valkova
- Phil Wlodarczyk

=== Best Professional Artwork ===
- Trudi Canavan for art in Aurealis #17, and Eidolon #22/23
- Norm & Margaret Hetherington for Mr Squiggle, ABC TV
- **Elizabeth Kyle, Cover of Dreamweavers**
- Shaun Tan for artwork in Eidolon and the cover of The Stray Cat
- Jason Towers for "Valdo Over Evora" cover, Australian Realms #28

=== William Atheling Jr. Award for Criticism or Review ===
- Russell Blackford, for "The Tiger in the Prison House", Science Fiction #37, Reviews of Distress in Science Fiction and NYRSF, and "Jewels in Junk City" in Review of Contemporary Fiction
- **Alan Stewart, for reviews in Thyme**
- Janeen Webb, for "Post human SF: Lost in Cyberspace", The Festival of Imagination Program Book

== 1998: Thylacon II, Hobart ==
=== Best Long Fiction ===
- **The White Abacus, Damien Broderick (Avon Books)**
- Winter, Simon Brown (HarperCollins)
- Darkfall, Isobelle Carmody (Penguin)
- Old Bones, Paul Collins
- Sinner, Sara Douglass (HarperCollins)

=== Best Short Fiction ===
- **"Niagara Falling", Janeen Webb & Jack Dann, Black Mist**
- "Lucent Carbon", Russell Blackford, Eidolon 25/26
- "The Willcroft Inheritance", Rick Kennett and Paul Collins, Gothic Ghosts
- "Reasons to Be Cheerful", Greg Egan, Interzone #118, [Withdrawn.]
- "Grievous Music", Carole Nomarhas, Eidolon 24

=== Best Dramatic Presentation ===
- **Spellbinder 2, Nine Network**
- Degree Absolute, Bedlam Theatre Company
- Multiverse Ceremonies Video

=== Best Artwork/Artist ===
- Kerri Valkova
- Marc McBride, Shivers Series
- **Nick Stathopoulos**
- Robert Jan
- R & D Studios, Eidolon Cover
- Shaun Tan, The Viewer

=== Best Fanzine ===
- **Eidolon**
- Frontier
- Thyme
- Captain's Log
- Oscillation Overthruster

=== Best Fan Writer ===
- George Ivanoff
- Terry Frost
- Bruce Gillespie
- **Leanne Frahm**
- Karen Johnson
- Cathy Cupitt

=== William Atheling Jr Award ===
- Katharine and Darren Maxwell, for X-files episode reviews in Frontier
- **Sean McMullen and Steven Paulsen, "Australia": Australian Contemporary Fantasy, Encyclopedia of Fantasy (Orbit)**

== 1999: Spawncon II, Melbourne ==
Presented as part of Aussiecon Three

=== Best Australian Long Fiction ===
- Pilgrim, Sara Douglass (HarperCollins)
- Feral, Kerry Greenwood (Hodder and Stoughton)
- The Centurion's Empire, Sean McMullen (Tor)
- The Tilecutter's Penny, Caiseal Mór (Random House)
- **The Resurrected Man, Sean Williams (HarperCollins)**

=== Best Australian Short Fiction ===
- "The Marsh Runners", Paul Brandon, Dreaming Down Under
- "The Evil Within", Sara Douglass, Dreaming Down Under
- "Dream Until God Burns", Andrew Enstice, Dreaming Down Under
- **"The Truth About Weena", David Lake, Dreaming Down Under**
- "Queen of Soulmates", Sean McMullen, Dreaming Down Under
- "To Avalon", Jane Routley, Dreaming Down Under

=== Best Australian Magazine or Anthology ===
- Altair, Rob Stephenson
- Aurealis, Stephen Higgins & Dirk Strasser
- **Dreaming Down-Under, Jack Dann & Janeen Webb (HarperCollins)**
- Eidolon, Jonathan Strahan & Jeremy Byrne
- Fantastic Worlds, Paul Collins (HarperCollins)
- MUP Encyclopedia of Australian Science Fiction, Paul Collins (M.U.P.)

=== Best Australian Fanzine ===
- The Captain's Log, Rose Mitchell
- Ethel the Aardvark, Ian Gunn
- Interstellar Ramjet Scoop, Bill Wright
- **Metaphysical Review, Bruce Gillespie**
- Out of the Kaje, Karen Johnson
- Thyme, Alan Stewart

=== Best Australian Fan Artist ===
- **Ian Gunn**
- Robert Jan
- Dick Jenssen
- Marco Nero
- Kerri Valkova

=== Best Australian Professional Artwork ===
- Emma Barber, Cover Cannibals of the Fine Light and/or Cover A View Before Dying
- Mark McBride, Cover Fantastic Worlds
- Marilyn Pride, A3 PRs and/or Peregrine Besset
- **Nick Stathopoulos, Cover The Man Who Melted and/or Cover Dreaming Down Under**
- Shaun Tan, The Rabbits

=== William Atheling Jr. Award ===
- Damien Broderick Reviews, The New York Review of Science Fiction
- **Paul Collins, MUP Encyclopaedia of Australian Science Fiction**
- Steven Paulsen, Contributions to MUP Encyclopedia of Australian Science Fiction
- Jonathan Strahan, Reviews in Locus
- Janeen Webb and Andrew Enstice, Aliens & Savages (HarperCollins)
- Sean Williams & Simon Brown, "No Axis No Boundary", in Altair 1

== 2000: Swancon 2000, Perth ==
An awards ceremony was held 16 December 2000; the actual trophies were presented later at Swancon 2001.

Original Nominations

=== Best Written Work (Professional) ===
- Paul Collins & Jack Wodhams, "Generation X", Cicada Nov/Dec 1999
- Stephen Dedman, The Lady of Situations (Ticonderoga Publications)
- Dave Luckett, A Dark Journey (Omnibus)
- Paul Collins, "The Nabakov Affair", in Australian Short Stories #63
- Rory Barnes & Damien Broderick, The Book of Revelation (HarperCollins)

=== Best Written Work (Unpaid or Fan) ===
- Colin Sharpe & Kate Langford, "Magical Cream Puff Destiny", in JAMWAF Magazine (JAFWA)
- Kyla Ward, "Night Cars", in Abaddon #2
- Robin Pen, Eidolist 1999 Reviews, in Eidolist
- Bill Wright, Interstellar Ramjet Scoop
- Alan Stewart, Thyme

=== Best Professional Production in Any Medium ===
- Sarah Endacott (ed), Orb 0
- Russell B. Farr (ed), The Lady of Situations (Ticonderoga Publications)
- Roadshow and Warner Brothers, The Matrix
- Paul Collins & Meredith Costain (ed), Spinouts (Pearson Education)
- MP Books, Antique Futures: The Best of Terry Dowling (MP Books)

=== Best Non-Professional Production in Any Medium ===
- Jonathan Strahan & Steven Paulsen, The Coode Street Review of Science Fiction
- Team, Twenty3, Swancon 2000 Launch Video
- Cathy Cupitt, The Rhizome Factor
- Danny Heap, The Opening Ceremony Video at Aussiecon Three
- Ion Newcombe, The Antipodean SF website

=== Best Artwork (Professional.) ===
- Nick Stathopoulos, The Cover of Antique Futures
- Graeme Bliss, The Cover of Clementine
- Marc McBride, The Cover of Spinouts
- Shaun Tan, The Cover of Orb 0
- Nick Stathopoulos, The Cover of The Aussiecon Three Souvenir Book

=== Best Artwork (Unpaid or Fan) ===
- Jeremy Nelson, The Cover of The Rhizome Factor #4
- Colin Sharpe, Illustrations for "The Magical Cream Puff Destiny"
- Dick Jenssen, Body of Work
- Phil Wlodarczyk, Cover of Ethel the Aardvark

=== William Atheling Award for Criticism or Review ===
- Van Ikin, Russell Blackford & Sean McMullen, Strange Constellations: A History of Australian Science Fiction (Greenwood)
- Judith Buckrich, George Turner: A Life 1916-1997 (M.U.P.)
- Robert Hood, Articles in i.am ezine
- Janeen Webb & Andrew Enstice, The Fantastic Self (Eidolon Press)
- Jonathan Strahan & Steven Paulsen, The Coode Street Review of Science Fiction

Second Round Nominations and Winners

=== Best Novel ===
- Damien Broderick and Rory Barnes, The Book of Revelation
- **Greg Egan, Teranesia (Award declined.)**
- Richard Harland, Hidden From View
- Dave Luckett, A Dark Victory
- Stephen Dedman, Foreign Bodies
- Jane Routley, Aramaya
- Sean McMullen, Souls in the Great Machine

=== Best Short Fiction ===
- Paul Collins, "The Nabakov Affair", in Australian Short Stories 63
- Robert Hood, "Ground Underfoot", in Aurealis 23
- Paul Collins and Jack Wodhams, "Generation X", in Cicada, Nov/Dec 99
- Robert Hood, "Primal Etiquette", in Orb 0
- **Chris Lawson, "Written in Blood", in Asimov's, June 1999**

=== Best Collected Work ===
- **Sean Williams, New Adventures in Sci-Fi**
- Damien Broderick and David Hartwell, Centaurus
- Terry Dowling, Antique Futures
- Paul Collins and Meredith Costain, Spinouts
- Stephen Dedman, The Lady Of Situations

=== Best Artwork ===
- **Shaun Tan, Cover to The Coode St Review Of Science Fiction**
- Nick Stathopoulos, Cover to Aussiecon 3 Programme Book
- Nick Stathopoulos, Cover to Dreaming Down Under Volume 2, (withdrawn as ineligible (published in 2000))
- Marc McBride, Covers to Spinouts

=== Best Fan Writer ===
- Bruce Gillespie
- Alan Stewart
- Karen Johnson
- **Robin Pen**
- Merv Binns

=== Best Fan Artist ===
Brad Foster withdrawn as ineligible (non-Australian)

- Dick Jenssen
- **Catriona Sparks**

=== Best Fan Production ===
- Jonathan Strahan and Steven Paulsen, The Coode St Review Of Science Fiction
- Alan Stewart, Thyme
- Cathy Cupitt, The Rhizome Factor
- Danny Heap, Nick Stathopoulos, Aussiecon 3 Masquerade Ceremony
- **Danny Heap, Aussiecon 3 Opening Ceremony Video**
- Bill Wright, Interstellar Ramjet Scoop
- Ethel The Aardvark

=== William Atheling Jr. Award ===
- Robert Hood, Writings in i.am website
- **Tess Williams and Helen Merrick, Women of Other Worlds**
- Jonathan Strahan, reviews in Locus
- **Russell Blackford, Van Ikin and Sean McMullen, Strange Constellations: A History Of Australian Science Fiction**
- Jonathan Strahan and Steven Paulsen, The Coode St Review of Science Fiction

== 2001: Swancon 2001: Masquerade, Perth ==
=== Best Novel ===
- Cyberskin, Paul Collins (Hybrid Publishers)
- The Miocene Arrow, Sean McMullen (Tor Books)
- Sea as Mirror, Tess Williams (HarperCollins Australia)
- **Evergence 2: The Dying Light, Sean Williams and Shane Dix (Ace Books)**

=== Best Short Fiction ===
Included Best Novella or Novelette eligible nominees

- "That Old Black Graffiti", Robert Hood, Tales from the Wasteland, ed. Paul Collins (Hodder Headline)
- **"The Devotee", Stephen Dedman, Eidolon 29/30**
- "The First and Final Game", Deborah Biancotti, Altair #6/7
- "The King with Three Daughters", Russell Blackford, Black Heart, Ivory Bones, eds. Ellen Datlow and Terri Windling (Avon)
- **"The Saltimbanques", Terry Dowling, Blackwater Days (Eidolon Publications)**
- "Basic Black", Terry Dowling, Blackwater Days (Eidolon Publications)

=== Best Collected Work ===
- Tales from the Wasteland, ed. Paul Collins (Hodder Headline)
- **Blackwater Days, Terry Dowling (Eidolon Publications)**
- White Time, Margo Lanagan (Allen and Unwin, Australia)

=== Best Artwork ===
- **Shaun Tan, The Lost Thing (Lothian Books)**
- Otto Schmidinger, "Space", Stamp Issue, Australia Post
- Marc McBride, Cover to Tales from the Wasteland (Hodder Headline)

=== Best Fan Writer ===
- Grant Watson
- **Robin Pen**
- Bruce Gillespie
- Alan Stewart

=== Best Fan Artist ===
- **Grant Watson**
- Jade Todd
- Dick (Ditmar) Jenssen

=== Best Fan Production ===
- The Rhizome Factor, ed. Cathy Cupitt
- First Sight, dir. Chris Dickinson
- **"The Angriest Video Store Clerk in the World", Grant Watson**
- SwanCon 2001 Launch Video
- The Unrelenting Gaze: SF Commentary # 76, ed. Bruce Gillespie
- Mitch? Short Stories for Short Attention Spans, ed. Mitch?

=== William Atheling Jr Award for Criticism and Review ===
- **Waking Henson: A Jim Henson Retrospective, Grant Watson and Simon Oxwell**
- The Unrelenting Gaze: SF Commentary # 76, ed. Bruce Gillespie
- Reviews in Locus: The Newspaper of the Science Fiction Field, Jonathan Strahan
- Transrealist Fiction, Damien Broderick (Greenwood)
- "Time Travel, Time Scapes and Timescape", Russell Blackford, The New York Review of SF #150

=== Best New Talent ===
- **Deborah Biancotti**

=== Best Professional Achievement ===
Two items ruled ineligible; category withdrawn

- Farscape, Channel 9/Henson Productions
- Spinouts Bronze, eds. Paul Collins & Meredith Costain (Pearson Educational)
- The Lost Thing, Shaun Tan (Lothian Books)

== 2002: Convergence, Melbourne ==
Best Novella/Novelette category left off the nomination form
Best Australian Artwork and William Atheling Jr. removed for insufficient nominees

=== Best Australian Novel ===
- Eyes of the Calculor, Sean McMullen (Tor)
- **Lirael, Garth Nix (Allen and Unwin)**
- The Year of the Intelligent Tigers, Kate Orman (BBC.)

=== Best Australian Short Fiction ===
Included Best Novella or Novelette eligible nominees

- **"Absolute Uncertainty", Lucy Sussex, F&SF, April 2001**
- "The Boneyard", Kyla Ward, Gothic.Net, September 2001
- **"The Diamond Pit", Jack Dann, Jubilee (HarperCollins)**
- "Rotten Times", Robert Hood, Aurealis 27/28
- "Tower of Wings", Sean McMullen, Analog, December 2001
- "Whispers", Rick Kennett & Paul Collins, Stalking Midnight (Cosmos Books)

=== Best Australian Collected Work ===
- **Earth is But a Star, Damien Broderick (UWA Press)**
- Jubilee, Jack Dann, (HarperCollins)
- Orb #2, Sarah Endacott
- Stalking Midnight, Paul Collins (Cosmos Books)

=== Best Fan Writer ===
Adrian Gaetano withdrew nomination

- Geoff Allshorn
- Deb Biancotti
- Bill Wright
- **Bruce Gillespie**

=== Best Fan Artist ===
- Miriam English
- **Dick Jenssen**
- Cat Sparks

=== Best Australian Fan Production, Fanzine ===
- Diverse Universe, Geoff & Miriam
- Fables and Reflections, Lily Chrywenstrom
- Interstellar Ram Jet Scoop, Bill Wright
- **SF Commentary, Bruce Gillespie**
- Solar Spectrum, Geoff & Miriam

=== Best Australian Fan Production, Other ===
Included Best Australian Fan Achievement eligible nominee

- Consensual, Stephen Dedman, Cathy Cupitt & Elaine Kemp
- JB Resurrection, Garth Thomas
- **Mitch? 2, Tarts of the New Millennium, Anthony Mitchell**
- **Spaced Out website** (www.vicnet.net.au/~spaceout/), Geoff & Miriam
- Tabula-Rasa, David Carroll & Kyla Ward

=== Best Australian Professional Achievement ===
- Meredith Costain and Paul Collins, Editing
- Robert Hood for the Young Adult Series, Shades (Hodder Headline)
- **Dirk Strasser & Stephen Higgins, for editing and production of Aurealis over so many years**

=== Best New Talent ===
- **Cat Sparks**

== 2003: Swancon 2003, Perth ==
=== Best Australian Novel ===
- Transcension, Damien Broderick
- **Echoes of Earth, Sean Williams & Shane Dix**
- Sovereign, Simon Brown
- The Storm Weaver and the Sand, Sean Williams
- Blue Silence, Michelle Marquardt
- The Sky Warden and the Sun, Sean Williams
- Time Past, Maxine McArthur

=== Best Australian Short Fiction ===
- "Father Muerte and the Thief", Lee Battersby, Aurealis 29
- "Stealing Alice", Claire McKenna, Agog! Fantastic Fiction
- "Scratches in the Sky", Ben Peek, Agog! Fantastic Fiction
- "Cigarettes and Roses", Ben Peek, Passing Strange
- **"King of All and The Metal Sentinel", Deborah Biancotti, Agog! Fantastic Fiction**

=== Best Australian Collected Work ===
- Machinations, ed. Chris Andrews (CSFG Publishing)
- **Agog! Fantastic Fiction, ed. Cat Sparks (Agog! Press)**
- Andromeda Spaceways Inflight Magazine, ed. ASIM Collective
- AustrAlien Absurdities, ed. Chuck McKenzie & Tansy Rayner Roberts (Agog! Press)
- Passing Strange, ed. Bill Congreve (MirrorDanse)

=== Best Australian Artwork ===
- **Passing Strange Cover, Cat Sparks**
- Andromeda Spaceways Inflight Magazine Cover Issue #3, Les Petersen
- AustrAlien Absurdities Cover, Dion Hamill
- Andromeda Spaceways Inflight Magazine Cover Issue #1, Les Petersen
- Andromeda Spaceways Inflight Magazine Cover Issue #4, Les Petersen
- Andromeda Spaceways Inflight Magazine Cover Issue #2, Les Petersen

=== Best Australian Fan Writer ===
- Edwina Harvey
- Chris Lawson
- **Robin Pen**
- Dave Cake
- Jonathan Strahan
- Grant Watson
- Bill Wright

=== Best Australian Fan Artist ===
- Miriam English
- Les Petersen
- Sarah Xu
- Dick Jenssen
- Colin Sharpe
- **Cat Sparks**

=== Best New Talent ===
- Lily Chrywenstrom
- Chris Mowbray
- Brendan Duffy
- **Lee Battersby**

=== Best Australian Fanzine ===
- Interstellar Ramjet Scoop, ed. Bill Wright
- **Fables & Reflections, ed. Lily Chrywenstrom**
- Australian SF Bullsheet, ed. Edwina Harvey
- Visions, ed. Stephen Thompson
- Antipodean SF, ed. Antipodean Computer Services

=== Best Australian Production ===
- **Andromeda Spaceways Inflight Magazine Launch**
- Spaced Out Website
- The View From Mt. Pootmootoo
- Eidolon Website

=== Best Australian Professional Achievement ===
- Lee Battersby
- Trent Jamieson
- **Jonathan Strahan**

=== Best Australian Fan Achievement ===
- **Borderlands: That which scares us..., ed. Simon Oxwell, Grant Watson and Anna Hepworth**
- Robin Pen
- Spaced Out Website, ed. Miriam and Geoff

=== The William Atheling Jr Award for Criticism or Review ===
- Tama Leaver
- **Jonathan Strahan**
- Robin Pen
- Bill Congreve
- Justine Larbalestier

== 2004: Conflux, Canberra ==
=== Best Novel ===
- **The Etched City, K. J. Bishop (Prime Books)**
- The High Lord, Trudi Canavan (HarperCollins)
- Abhorsen, Garth Nix (Allen & Unwin)
- Fallen Gods, Jonathan Blum & Kate Orman, (Telos Publishing)
- Orphans of Earth, Sean Williams & Shane Dix (HarperCollins)

=== Best Novella or Novelette ===
- "Alien Space Nazis Must Die", Chuck McKenzie, Elsewhere
- "Sigmund Freud & the Feral Freeway", Martin Livings, Agog! Terrific Tales
- "Louder Echo", Brendan Duffy, Agog! Terrific Tales
- "Uncharted", Leigh Blackmore, Agog! Terrific Tales
- "Rynemonn", Terry Dowling, Forever Shores
- **"La Sentinelle", Lucy Sussex, Southern Blood**

=== Best Short Story ===
- "The Mark of His Hands", Chuck McKenzie, Orb #5, April 2003
- "The Singular Life of Eddy Dovewater", Deborah Biancotti, Agog! Terrific Tales
- "Kijin Tea", Kyla Ward, Agog! Terrific Tales
- **"Room for Improvement", Trudi Canavan, Forever Shores**
- "The Truth About Pug Roberts", Kirstyn McDermott, Southern Blood: New Australian Tales of the Supernatural
- "Frozen Charlottes", Lucy Sussex, Forever Shores

=== Best Collected Work ===
- **Agog! Terrific Tales - Cat Sparks ed. (Agog! Press)**
- Elsewhere - Michael Barry ed. (CSFG Publishing)
- Andromeda Spaceways Inflight Magazine - ASIM Publishing Cooperative
- Southern Blood - Bill Congreve ed. (Sandglass Enterprises)
- **Forever Shores - Peter McNamara & Margaret Winch eds. (Wakefield Press)**

=== Best Fan Production ===
- Swancon 2003 Opening Ceremony & Video - Swancon 2003 Committee
- Spaced Out website - Geoff & Miriam
- **Elsewhere Book Launch - CSFG**
- "The Mega Panel" - Arron Jacks & Mitch, Continuum 2003
- "Mondys's Perfect Match" - Ian Mond, Continuum 2003

=== Best Fanzine ===
- **The Australian SF Bullsheet** - Edwina Harvey & Edwin Scribner (ed.)
- Three-Eyed Frog - Paul Ewins & Sue Ann Barber
- Fables & Reflections - Lily Chrywenstrom
- Dark Animus - James Cain
- No Award - Russell B. Farr
- Fandom is my life - Danny Oz

=== Best Fan Writer ===
- **Bruce Gillespie**
- Edwina Harvey
- Danny Oz
- Grant Watson
- Paul Ewins

=== Best Fan Artist ===
- **Les Petersen - for "Battle Elf" (Conflux) poster**
- Dick Jenssen - for extensive body of work
- Phil Wlodarczyk - for cartoons in Ethel the Aardvark
- Miriam English - for Diverse Universe

=== Best Artwork ===
- Greg Bridges - Cover of Axis Trilogy by Sara Douglass
- Les Petersen - Cover of Elsewhere by Michael Barry (ed.)
- **Cat Sparks - Cover of Agog! Terrific Tales by Cat Sparks (ed.)**
- Les Petersen - Cover of The High Lord by Trudi Canavan
- Trudi Canavan - Cover of Fables & Reflections 5 by Lily Chrywenstrom (ed.)

=== Best New Talent ===
- **K. J. Bishop**
- Ben Peek
- Brendan Duffy
- Glenda Larke
- Anna Tambour
- Monica Carroll

=== William Atheling Jr. Award ===
- **Bruce Gillespie**
- Jonathan Strahan
- Lee Battersby
- Jason Nahrung
- Grant Watson

== 2005: Thylacon 2005, Hobart ==
=== Best Novel ===
- The Black Crusade, Richard Harland
- Less than Human, Maxine McArthur
- **The Crooked Letter, Sean Williams**

=== Best Collected Work ===
- Agog! Smashing Stories - Cat Sparks (ed.)
- **Black Juice - Margo Lanagan**
- Andromeda Spaceways Inflight Magazine - Lyn Triffitt, Edwina Harvey, Andrew Finch, Zara Baxter, Robbie Matthews & Tehani Croft (ed.)
- Orb 6 - Sarah Endacott (ed.)
- Encounters - Donna Hanson and Maxine McArthur (ed.)

=== Best Novella or Novelette ===
- Simon Brown: "Water Babies", Agog! Smashing Stories, April
- Stephen Dedman: "The Whole of the Law", ASIM 13
- **Paul Haines: - "The Last Days of Kali Yuga", NFG Magazine, Volume 2 Issue 4, August 2004**
- Richard Harland: "Catabolic Magic", Aurealis #32
- Cat Sparks: "Home by the Sea", Orb #6, July

=== Best Short Story ===
- Deborah Biancotti: "Number 3 Raw Place", Agog! Smashing Stories, April
- Rjurik Davidson: "The Interminable Suffering of Mysterious Mr Wu", Aurealis #33
- **Margo Lanagan: - "Singing My Sister Down", Black Juice**
- Ben Peek: "R", Agog! Smashing Stories, ed by Cat Sparks

=== Best Professional Artwork ===
- Les Petersen: cover of ASIM 12
- **Kerri Valkova: - Cover of The Black Crusade (Chimaera Publications)**
- Cat Sparks: Agog! Smashing Stories cover
- Les Petersen: Encounters Book Cover
- Les Petersen: cover and internal ASIM 16

=== Best Professional Achievement ===
- **The Clarion South Team (Fantastic Queensland; Convenors Robert Hoge, Kate Eltham, Robert Dobson & Heather Gammage): negotiating with the US Clarion people, then promoting and establishing Clarion South which gives emerging writer the chance to work with the best in the business.**
- Cat Sparks: editing and writing including winning third place in the writers of the future award
- Margo Lanagan: for Black Juice
- Geoff Maloney: for Tales of the Crypto-System, his short story publications
- Sean Williams for The Crooked Letter and efforts in teaching
- Jonathan Strahan for work over the year in internationally published reviews and in editing anthologies

=== Best Fan Achievement ===
- Super Happy Robot Hour
- **Conflux convention committee**
- Continuum 2 convention committee

=== Best Fan Artist ===
- **Sarah Xu**

=== Best Fan Website/Zine ===
- Antipodean SF - Ion Newcombe (ed.)
- **Australian Science Fiction Bullsheet - ed Edwina Harvey & Ted Scribner**
- Gynaezine - Emma Hawkes and Gina Goddard (ed.)

=== Best Fan Writer ===
- Edwina Harvey
- **Bruce Gillespie**

=== Best New Talent ===
- Chris Barnes
- Stuart Barrow
- Grace Dugan
- **Paul Haines**
- Barbara Robson
- Brian Smith

=== William Atheling Jnr. Award for Criticism or Review ===
- **Robert Hood - review of Weight of Water at HoodReviews, asking "is this film a ghost story?"**
- **Jason Nahrung - "Why are publishers afraid of horror?", BAM, Courier-Mail, 20 March 2004**
- Ben Peek - review of Haruki Murakami's work in the Urban Sprawl Project

== 2006: Conjure, Brisbane ==
=== Best Novel ===
- Magic or Madness - Justine Larbalestier (Razorbill, 17 March 2005)
- Drowned Wednesday - Garth Nix (Allen & Unwin, Jan 2005)
- Midnight 2: Touching Darkness - Scott Westerfeld (Eos, 1 March 2005)
- Peeps - Scott Westerfeld (Razorbill, 25 August 2005)
- Uglies - Scott Westerfeld (Simon Pulse, 8 February 2005)
- **Geodesica: Ascent - Sean Williams & Shane Dix (Ace)**

=== Best Collected Work ===
- Shadowed Realms (www.shadowedrealms.com.au) - Angela Challis & Shane Jiraiya Cummings
- Years Best Australian SF & Fantasy - Bill Congreve & Michelle Marquardt (MirrorDanse)
- **Daikaiju! Giant Monster Tales - Robert Hood & Robin Pen (Agog! Press)**
- A Tour Guide in Utopia - Lucy Sussex (MirrorDanse Books)
- The Grinding House - Kaaron Warren, ed. Donna Maree Hanson, (CSFG Publishing)

=== Best Novella or Novelette ===
- "Passing of the Minotaurs" - Rjurik Davidson, SciFi.com, April 2005
- "The Red Priest's Homecoming "- Dirk Flinthart, Andromeda Spaceways Inflight Magazine #17
- "Countless Screaming Argonauts" - Chris Lawson, Realms of Fantasy
- "The Memory of Breathing" - Lyn Triffitt (Battersby), Andromeda Spaceways Inflight Magazine #17
- **"The Grinding House" - Kaaron Warren, The Grinding House, CSFG Publishing**

=== Best Short Story ===
- "Summa Seltzer Missive" - Deborah Biancotti, Ticonderoga Online #6
- "Leviathan" - Simon Brown, Eidolon SF: Online
- "Once Giants Roamed the Earth" - Rosaleen Love, Daikaju! (Agog! Press)
- "Matricide" - Lucy Sussex, SciFiction
- **"Fresh Young Widow" - Kaaron Warren, The Grinding House (CSFG Publishing)**

=== Best Professional Artwork ===
- cover art for The Blood Debt by Sean Williams (HarperCollins Australia) - Greg Bridges
- cover art for The Grinding House by Karon Warren, ed. Donna Maree Hanson (CSFG) - Robin Evans
- cover art for **Australian Speculative Fiction: A Genre Overview, ed. Donna Hanson - Nick Stathopoulos**
- Fell #3 - Ben Templesmith (Image Comics)

=== Best Professional Achievement ===
- Damien Broderick, Wilson de Silva and Kylie Ahern - Cosmos
- **Robert Dobson, Robert Hoge, Kate Eltham, Heather Gammage - Clarion South 2005, Clarion South Workshop**
- Donna Maree Hanson - Australian Speculative Fiction: a genre overview (Australian Speculative Fiction Project)
- Michael Rymer - Screenwriting and directing, Battlestar Galactica Season 2.0, Sci-Fi Channel
- Jonathan Strahan - for editing Best Short Novels: 2005 (SFBC), and co-editing Science Fiction: Best of 2004 (ibooks) and Fantasy: Best of 2004 (ibooks)

=== Best Fan Production ===
- **Edwina Harvey and Ted Scribner - The Australian Science Fiction Bullsheet website and newsletter**
- Alisa Krasnostein - ASif!: Australian SpecFic In Focus (http://asif.dreamhosters.com/doku.php)
- Tony Plank - Inkspillers website (www.inkspillers.com)
- Conflux Committee - Conflux 2 convention
- Continuum Committee - Continuum 3 convention

=== Best Fan Artist ===
- Dick Jenssen - Artwork in American fan Earl Kemp's ezines eI 20 (June 2005) and eI 23 (Dec 2005) published via efanzines.com, and Ditmar graphics (cover illustrations) for IRS ( 5 issues) published by Bill Wright
- Elaine Kemp - ConSensual a Trois interior artwork, ConSensual a Trois April 2005
- **Shane Parker - Conflux Poster Art, Conflux**

=== Best Fanzine/website ===
- Horrorscope - Shane Jiraiya Cummings et al.
- **Ticonderoga Online - Russell B. Farr et al.**
- Interstellar Ramjet Scoop - Bill Wright (ed)

=== Best Fan Writer ===
- **Shane Jiraiya Cummings - Writer/reviewer, Horror Scope**
- Bruce Gillespie - Writer/reviewer, Steam Engine Time and Science Fiction Commentary, *brg*, Earl Kemp's ezines
- Stephanie Gunn - Writer/reviewer, Horror Scope
- Martin Livings - "Skeletor_Hordak", LiveJournal web comic
- Bill Wright - Interstellar Ramjet Scoop, published by Bill Wright

=== Best New Talent ===
- Lyn Battersby (née Triffit)
- **Rjurik Davidson**
- Karen Miller

=== The William Atheling Jr. Award ===
- Ferocious Minds: Polymathy and the New Enlightenment (Wildside Press) - Damien Broderick
- **"Divided Kingdom: King Kong vs Godzilla", in King Kong is Back (Benbella Books) - Robert Hood**
- "Body Parts", in Borderlands - Chris Lawson
- "PK Dick: The Exhilaration and the Terror", in Borderlands - Rosaleen Love
- "The 2005 Snapshot: Australian Speculative Fiction writers, editors, publishers" () - Ben Peek

== 2007: Convergence 2, Melbourne ==
=== Best Novel ===
- Carnies, Martin Livings (Lothian)
- Prismatic, Edwina Grey (Lothian)
- The Mother, Brett McBean (Lothian)
- **The Pilo Family Circus, Will Elliott (ABC Books)**
- The Silver Road, Grace Dugan (Penguin)

=== Best Novella/Novelette ===
- "Aftermath", David Conyers, Agog! Ripping Reads (Agog! Press)
- "The Dead of Winter", Stephen Dedman, Weird Tales, #339
- **"The Devil in Mr Pussy (Or how I found God inside my wife)", Paul Haines, C0ck (Coeur de Lion Publishing)**
- "The Souls of Dead Soldiers are for Blackbirds, Not Little Boys", Ben Peek, Agog! Ripping Reads, (Agog! Press)
- "Under the Red Sun", Ben Peek, Fantasy Magazine #4, (Prime Books)
- "World's Whackiest Upper Atmosphere Re-Entry Disasters Dating Game", Brendan Duffy, Agog! Ripping Reads (Agog! Press)

=== Best Short Story ===
- "Burning from the Inside", Paul Haines, Doorways for the Dispossessed (Prime Books)
- "Cold", Kirstyn McDermott, Shadowed Realms #9
- "Honeymoon", Adam Browne and John Dixon, C0ck, (Coeur de Lion Publishing)
- "Surrender 1: Rope Artist", Deborah Biancotti, Shadowed Realms #9
- "The Bat's Boudoir", Kyla Ward, Shadowed Realms #9
- **"The Fear of White", Rjurik Davidson, Borderlands #7**

=== Best Collected Work ===
- Agog! Ripping Reads, Cat Sparks (ed.) (Agog! Press)
- C0ck, Keith Stevenson & Andrew Macrae (eds.)
- Doorways for the Dispossessed, Paul Haines and Geoffrey Maloney (eds.) (Prime Books)
- **The Year's Best Australian Science Fiction and Fantasy Vol.2, Bill Congreve & Michelle Marquardt (eds.) (Mirrordanse Books)**
- Eidolon I, Jonathan Strahan and Jeremy Byrne (eds.) (Eidolon Books)

=== Best Artwork/Artist ===
- **26Lies/1Truth, cover art by Andrew MacRae (Wheatland Press)**
- Agog! Ripping Reads, cover art by Cat Sparks (Agog! Press)
- Daughters of Earth: Feminist Science Fiction in the Twentieth Century cover art by Cat Sparks (Wesleyan University Press)
- The Devoured Earth, cover art by Greg Bridges (HarperCollins Press)
- The Arrival, cover art by Shaun Tan (Lothian)

=== Best Fan Writer ===
- Stephanie Gunn
- Shane Jiraiya Cummings
- **Danny Oz**
- Miranda Siemienowicz
- Mark Smith-Briggs
- Matthew Tait

=== Best Fan Artist ===
- Christopher Johnstone
- **Jon Swabey**

=== Best Fan Production ===
- **ASif website, Alisa Krasnostein – Executive Editor**
- Inkspillers website, Tony Plank
- Outland, Directed by John Richards
- Tabula Rasa website, David Carroll
- The Bullsheet website & ezine, Edwina Harvey & Ted Scribner

=== Best Fanzine ===
- AntipodeanSF, editor Ion Newcombe
- ASIF – Australian SpecFic in Focus, editor Alisa Krasnostein
- The Captain's Log, Austrek clubzine. Edited by Clare McDonald
- Ethel the Aardvark, MSFC clubzine
- **HorrorScope, editor Shane Jiraiya Cummings**

=== Best Professional Achievement ===
- Angelia Challis for establishing Brimstone Press as a mass market publisher
- **Bill Congreve for Mirrordanse Press and 2 issues of the Australian Year's Best Science Fiction and Fantasy**
- Russell B. Farr for Ticonderoga Publications
- Gary Kemble for work on ABC's Articulate and promoting the genre through radio and other mediums
- Alisa Krasnostein for providing new paying markets for readers and writers of both fiction/ non-fiction, art as well as forums for reviews/interviews within the speculative fiction genre, enhancing the profile of Australian speculative fiction.
- Justine Larbalestier, for editing Daughters of Earth: Feminist Science Fiction in the Twentieth Century

=== Best Fan Achievement ===
- Marty Young for his work establishing and promoting the Australian Horror Writers Association
- **Alisa Krasnostein for establishing ASIf**
- Tony Plank for establishing and maintaining the Inkspillers website

=== Best New Talent ===
- Stephanie Campisi
- David Conyers
- Shane Jiraiya Cummings
- **Alisa Krasnostein**
- Brett McBean

=== William Atheling Jr Award ===
- Miranda Siemienowicz for her review of Paraspheres appearing in Horrorscope
- **Justine Larbalestier for Daughters of Earth: Feminist Science Fiction in the Twentieth Century**
- Robert Hood for "Man and Super-Monster: A History of Daikaiju Eiga and its Metaphorical Undercurrents", Borderlands #7
- Grant Watson for "Bad Film Diaries - Sink or Swim: The Truth Behind Waterworld", Borderlands #8
- Kathryn Linge for her review "Through Soft Air", ASif

== 2008: State of the Art: Swancon 2008, Perth ==
=== Best Novel ===
- The Company of the Dead, David Kowalski (PanMacmillan)
- Extras, Scott Westerfeld (Simon & Schuster)
- Dark Space, Marianne de Pierres (Orbit)
- **Saturn Returns, Sean Williams (Orbit)**
- Magic's Child, Justine Larbalestier (Penguin)
- The Darkness Within, Jason Nahrung (Hachette Livre)

=== Best Novella/Novelette ===
- "Yamabushi Kaidan and the Smoke Dragon", Shane Jiraiya Cummings, Fantastic Wonder Stories, edited by Russell B. Farr
- "Where is Brisbane and How Many Times Do I Get There?", Paul Haines, Fantastical Journeys to Brisbane, edited by Geoffrey Maloney, Trent Jamieson and Zoran Zivkovic
- "The Bluebell Vengeance", Tansy Rayner Roberts, Andromeda Spaceways Inflight Magazine #28 edited by Zara Baxter
- **"A Lady of Adestan", Cat Sparks, Orb #7, edited by Sarah Endacott**
- Cenotaxis, Sean Williams (MonkeyBrain Books)
- "Sir Hereward and Mister Fitz Go To War Again", Garth Nix Jim Baen's Universe

=== Best Short Story ===
- **"The Dark and What It Said", Rick Kennett Andromeda Spaceways Inflight Magazine #28, edited by Zara Baxter**
- "Domine", Rjurik Davidson, Aurealis #37, edited by Stephen Higgins and Stuart Mayne
- "A Scar for Leida", Deb Biancotti, Fantastic Wonder Stories, edited by Russell B. Farr
- "Bad Luck, Trouble, Death and Vampire Sex", Garth Nix, Eclipse One, edited by Jonathan Strahan
- "The Sun People", Sue Isle, Shiny #2, edited by Alisa Krasnostein, Ben Payne and Tansy Rayner Roberts
- "His Lipstick Minx", Kaaron Warren, The Workers' Paradise, edited by Russell B. Farr and Nick Evans

=== Best Collected Work ===
- Orb #7, Sarah Endacott (ed.) (Orb Publications)
- The Workers' Paradise, Russell B. Farr and Nick Evans (eds.) (Ticonderoga Publications)
- New Ceres, Alisa Krasnstein (ed.) (Twelfth Planet Press)
- **The New Space Opera, Jonathan Strahan (ed.) (HarperCollins Australia)**
- **Fantastic Wonder Stories, Russell B. Farr (ed.) (Ticonderoga Publications)**

=== Best Artwork/Artist ===
- Daryl Lindquist for the ASIM #28 cover
- Nick Stathopolous for the Daikaju #3 cover
- Eleanor Clark for ASIM #31 internal art
- Amanda Rainey for The Workers' Paradise cover
- **Nick Stathopolous for the Rynemonn cover**
- Eleanor Clark for ASIM #30 internal art

=== Best Fan Writer ===
- Alexandra Pierce for Last Short Story on Earth and for ASiF! reviews
- Shane Jiraiya Cummings for Horrorscope
- Grant Watson for the 'angriest' Livejournal
- **Rob Hood for film reviews on his website**

=== Best Fan Art ===
- **"Exterminate!" Dalek Postcards - Kathryn Linge**
- 'Nights Edge' Convention Poster Art - John Parker

=== Best Fan Production ===
- **2007 Snap Shot Project - interviews with influential members of the Australian speculative fiction scene conducted by Alisa Krasnostein, Ben Payne, Alexandra Pierce, Tansy Rayner Roberts, Katherine Linge, Kaaron Warren and Rosie Clark**
- Inkspillers Website - Tony Plank
- "The Liminal" short film - directed by Claire McKenna
- Daikaju Limerick Competition - Robert Hood on his website
- Talking Squid Website - Chris Lawson

=== Best Fanzine ===
- The Australian Science Fiction Bullsheet, Ted Scribner and Edwina Harvey (eds.)
- **Not If You Were the Last Short Story on Earth, Alisa Krasnostein, Ben Payne, Alexandra Pierce, Tansy Rayner Roberts (eds.)**
- Steam Engine Time, edited by Bruce Gillespie
- Horrorscope, Shane Jiraiya Cummings (ed.)

=== Best Professional Achievement ===
- Gary Kemble for his continued coverage of speculative fiction on Articulate and ABC news online
- Russell B. Farr for Ticonderoga Publications; in 2007, Russell produced an issue of Ticonderoga Online, The Workers' Paradise and Fantastic Wonder Stories, which produced five Aurealis Award nominees
- Jonathan Strahan for a prolific body of work editing The Jack Vance Treasury, The Best Science Fiction and Fantasy of the Year, Best Short Novels of 2007, The New Space Opera, Ascendancies: The Best of Bruce Sterling and Eclipse One: New Science Fiction and Fantasy
- **Andromeda Spaceways Publishing Co-Operative Ltd for five issues in 2007, including three electronic Best Of anthologies**
- Jonathan Strahan, Garth Nix, Deb Biancotti and Trevor Stafford for compiling and promoting the new Australian Fantasy and SF catalogue in the United States to increase awareness and appreciation of forthcoming Australian SF and to expand creative and professional opportunities for writers

=== Best Fan Achievement ===
- **Alisa Krasnostein for ASiF! Australian Speculative Fiction in Focus**
- Marty Young for his work as President of the Australian Horror Writers Association
- John Parker, Sarah Parker and Sarah Xu for Night's Edge Convention
- Sarah Xu for the CyPEC Cyber-feminist Conference held as part of Night's Edge convention

=== Best New Talent ===
- Angela Slatter
- Jason Nahrung
- Nathan Burrage
- **Tehani Wessely**
- David Conyers

=== William Atheling Jr Award ===
- Ian Nichols for "Seriatem, Seriatum, omnia Seriatem" (Published by Andromeda Spaceways Inflight Magazine #30, edited by Robbie Matthews)
- Tansy Rayner Roberts and Alexandra Pierce for review of Elizabeth Bear's New Amsterdam (Published as Podcast #2 on ASiF!)
- Jonathan Strahan for editorial for The New Space Opera (Published in The New Space Opera by HarperCollins Australia)
- **Grant Watson for "The Bad Film Diaries" (Published in Borderlands #9)**
- Ben Peek for the Aurealis Awards Shortlist Feature Article (Published on ASiF!)
- Shane Jiraiya Cummings for review of David Conyers' and John Sunseri's The Spiraling Worm (Published on Horrorscope)
- Ian Nichols for "The Shadow Thief" (Published by The West Australian Weekend Magazine on 22 September 2007)

== 2009: Conjecture, Adelaide ==
=== Best Novel ===
- Hal Spacejock: No Free Lunch, Simon Haynes
- Daughter of Moab, Kim Westwood
- Earth Ascendant, Sean Williams
- Fivefold, Nathan Burrage
- How to Ditch Your Fairy, Justine Larbalestier
- **Tender Morsels, Margo Lanagan**

=== Best Novella/Novelette ===
- "Creeping in Reptile Flesh", Robert Hood
- "Soft Viscosity", David Conyers
- "Angel Rising", Dirk Flinthart
- "Night Heron's Curse", Thoraiya Dyer
- **"Painlessness", Kirstyn McDermott**

=== Best Short Story ===
- **"The Goosle", Margo Lanagan**
- **"This Is Not My Story", Dirk Flinthart**
- "Pale Dark Soldier", Deborah Biancotti
- "Sammarynda Deep", Cat Sparks
- "Her Collection of Intimacy", Paul Haines
- "Ass-Hat Magic Spider", Scott Westerfeld
- "Moments of Dying", Robert Hood

=== Best Collected Work ===
- Black: Australian Dark Culture Magazine, edited by Angela Challis
- Creeping in Reptile Flesh, Robert Hood
- 2012, edited by Alisa Krasnostein and Ben Payne
- Canterbury 2100, edited by Dirk Flinthart
- Midnight Echo, edited by Kirstyn McDermott and Ian Mond
- **Dreaming Again, edited by Jack Dann**
- The Starry Rift, edited by Jonathan Strahan

=== Best Artwork ===
- **Tales from Outer Suburbia, Shaun Tan**
- The Last Realm, Book 1: Dragonscarpe, Michal Dutkiewicz
- Gallery in Black Box, Andrew McKiernan
- Aurealis #40 cover, Adam Duncan
- Creeping in Reptile Flesh cover, Cat Sparks
- 2012 cover, Cat Sparks

=== Best Fan Writer ===
- Mark Smith-Briggs, for work in Horrorscope
- Edwina Harvey, for work in The Australian Science Fiction Bullsheet
- Chuck McKenzie, for work in Horrorscope
- Craig Bezant, for work in Horrorscope
- Brenton Tomlinson, for work in Horrorscope
- **Robert Hood, for work in Undead Backbrain**

=== Best Fan Artist ===
- **Cat Sparks, for Scary Food Cookbook**
- Anna Tambour, for "Box of Noses" and other works
- Rachel Holkner, for "Gumble Soft" toy and other works
- Tansy Rayner Roberts, for "Daleks are a Girl's Best Friend"
- Andrew McKiernan, for body of work
- David Schembri, for body of work
- Nancy Lorenz, for body of work

=== Best Fan Publication in Any Medium ===
- **ASif! (Australian SpecFic in Focus), edited by Alisa Krasnostein and Gene Melzack**
- Horrorscope, edited by Shane Jiraiya Cummings et al.
- The Australian SF Bullsheet, edited by Edwina Harvey and Ted Scribner
- Scary Food Cookbook, edited by Cat Sparks

=== Best Achievement ===
- **Angela Challis, for Black: Australian Dark Culture Magazine and Brimstone Press**
- Damien Broderick, for fiction editing in Cosmos
- Talie Helene, for her work as AHWA News Editor
- James "Jocko" Allen and KRin Pender-Gunn, for "The Gunny Project: A tribute to Ian Gunn 1959-1998"
- Steven Clark, for Tasmaniac Productions
- James Doig, for preserving colonial Australian horror fiction and editing Australian Gothic and Australian Nightmares
- Marty Young and the AHWA Committee, for promoting Australian horror through the AHWA

=== Best New Talent ===
- Amanda Pillar
- Jason Fischer
- Peter M. Ball
- **Felicity Dowker**
- Gary Kemble

=== William Atheling Jr Award ===
- **Kim Wilkins, for "Popular genres and the Australian literary community: the case of fantasy fiction"**
- Shane Jiraiya Cummings, for "Dark Suspense: The End of the Line"
- Grant Watson, for "Bad Film Diaries - Sometimes the Brand Burns: Tim Burton and the Planet of the Apes"
- Robert Hood, for "George A. Romero: Master of the Living Dead"

== 2010: Dudcon III, Melbourne ==
=== Best Novel ===
- Leviathan, Scott Westerfeld (Penguin)
- Liar, Justine Larbalestier (Bloomsbury)
- World Shaker, Richard Harland (Allen & Unwin)
- **Slights, Kaaron Warren (Angry Robot Books)**
- Life Through Cellophane, Gillian Polack (Eneit Press)

=== Best Novella or Novelette ===
- "Siren Beat", Tansy Rayner Roberts (Twelfth Planet Press)
- "Black Water", David Conyers, Jupiter
- "After the World: Gravesend", Jason Fischer (Black House Comics)
- Horn, Peter M. Ball (Twelfth Planet Press)
- **"Wives", Paul Haines, X6 (Coeur de Lion)**

=== Best Short Story ===
- "The Piece of Ice in Ms Windermere's Heart", Angela Slatter, New Ceres Nights (Twelfth Planet Press)
- "Six Suicides", Deborah Biancotti, A Book of Endings (Twelfth Planet Press)
- "Black Peter" Marty Young, Festive Fear (Tasmaniac Publications)
- **"Seventeen", Cat Sparks, Masques (CSFG)**
- "Tontine Mary", Kaaron Warren, New Ceres Nights (Twelfth Planet Press)
- "Prosperine When it Sizzles", Tansy Rayner Roberts, New Ceres Nights (Twelfth Planet Press)

=== Best Collected Work ===
- The New Space Opera 2, edited by Jonathan Strahan and Gardner Dozois (HarperCollins)
- New Ceres Nights, edited by Alisa Krasnostein and Tehani Wessely (Twelfth Planet Press)
- **Slice Of Life, Paul Haines, edited by Geoffrey Maloney (The Mayne Press)**
- A Book of Endings, Deborah Biancotti, edited by Alisa Krasnostein and Ben Payne (Twelfth Planet Press)
- Eclipse Three, edited by Jonathan Strahan (Night Shade Books)

=== Best Artwork ===
- Cover art, New Ceres Nights (Twelfth Planet Press), Dion Hamill
- Cover art, The Whale's Tale (Peggy Bright Books), Eleanor Clarke
- Cover art and illustrations, Shards: Short Sharp Tales (Brimstone Press), Andrew J. McKiernan
- **Cover art, Andromeda Spaceways Inflight Magazine #42, Lewis Morley**
- Cover art, Horn (Twelfth Planet Press), Dion Hamill
- Cover art, Masques (CSFG), Mik Bennett

=== Best Fan Writer ===
- Tansy Rayner Roberts for body of work
- Chuck McKenzie for work in Horrorscope
- **Robert Hood for Undead Backbrain (roberthood.net/blog**)
- Tehani Wessely for body of work
- Bruce Gillespie for work in Steam Engine Time

=== Best Fan Artist ===
- Dave Schembri for work in Midnight Echo
- Kathleen Jennings for body of work
- **Dick Jenssen for body of work**

=== Best Fan Publication in Any Medium ===
- Interstellar Ramjet Scoop, edited by Bill Wright
- A Writer Goes on a Journey (http://awritergoesonajourney.com), edited by Nyssa Pascoe et al.
- ASif! (http://asif.dreamhosters.com/), edited by Alisa Krasnostein, Gene Melzack et al.
- Australian Science Fiction Bullsheet (http://bullsheet.sf.org.au), edited by Edwina Harvey and Ted Scribner
- **Steam Engine Time, edited by Bruce Gillespie and Janine Stinson**

=== Best Achievement ===
- Alisa Krasnostein, Liz Grzyb, Tehani Wessely, Cat Sparks and Kate Williams for the New Ceres Nights book launch
- H. Gibbens for the Gamers' Quest CGI-animated book trailer (https://www.youtube.com/watch?v=0vCC-l34Fgo)
- Ruth Jenkins and Cathy Jenkins-Rutherford for the children's program at Conjecture
- Amanda Rainey for the cover design of Siren Beat/Roadkill (Twelfth Planet Press)
- **Gillian Polack et al. for the Southern Gothic banquet at Conflux**

=== Best New Talent ===
- Pete Kempshall
- Kathleen Jennings
- Thoraiya Dyer
- Jason Fischer
- Simon Petrie
- Christopher Green
- **Peter M. Ball**

=== William Atheling Jr Award for Criticism or Review ===
- Chuck McKenzie for "The Dead Walk! … Into a Bookstore Near You", Eye of Fire #1 (Brimstone Press)
- Ian Mond for reviews on his blog (http://mondyboy.livejournal.com)
- Grant Watson for reviews and articles for Eiga: Asian Cinema (http://www.eigaasiancinema.com)
- **Helen Merrick for The Secret Feminist Cabal: a cultural history of science fiction feminisms (Aqueduct Press)**

== 2011: Swancon Thirty Six | Natcon Fifty, Perth ==
There was a version of the ballot on which the cover design by Lisa L. Hannett for The Girl With No Hands was nominated as cover art under Best Artwork. When it was reclassified as cover design under Best Achievement, cover art by Andrew J. McKiernon for Savage Menace and Other Poems of Horror got onto the ballot under Best Artwork.

=== Best Novel ===
- Death Most Definite, Trent Jamieson (Hachette)
- Madigan Mine, Kirstyn McDermott (Pan Macmillan)
- **Power and Majesty**, **Tansy Rayner Roberts (Voyager)**
- Stormlord Rising, Glenda Larke (Voyager)
- Walking the Tree, Kaaron Warren (Angry Robot Books)

=== Best Novella or Novelette ===
- "Acception", Tessa Kum (Eneit Press)
- "All the Clowns in Clowntown", Andrew J McKiernan (Brimstone Press)
- "Bleed", Peter M. Ball (Twelfth Planet Press)
- "Her Gallant Needs", Paul Haines (Twelfth Planet Press)
- **"The Company Articles of Edward Teach", Thoraiya Dyer (Twelfth Planet Press)**

=== Best Short Story ===
- **"All the Love in the World", Cat Sparks, Sprawl (Twelfth Planet Press)**
- "Bread and Circuses", Felicity Dowker, Scary Kisses (Ticonderoga Publications)
- "One Saturday Night With Angel", Peter M. Ball, Sprawl (Twelfth Planet Press)
- **"She Said", Kirstyn McDermott, Scenes From the Second Storey (Morrigan Books)**
- "The House of Nameless", Jason Fischer, Writers of the Future XXVI (Galaxy Press)
- "The February Dragon", Angela Slatter and Lisa L. Hannett, Scary Kisses (Ticonderoga Publications)

=== Best Collected Work ===
- Baggage, edited by Gillian Polack (Eneit Press)
- Macabre: A Journey through Australia's Darkest Fears, edited by Angela Challis and Marty Young (Brimstone Press)
- Scenes from the Second Storey, edited by Amanda Pillar and Pete Kempshall (Morrigan Books)
- **Sprawl**, **edited by Alisa Krasnostein (Twelfth Planet Press)**
- Worlds Next Door, edited by Tehani Wessely (FableCroft Publishing)

=== Best Artwork ===
- Cover art, The Angaelien Apocalypse/The Company Articles of Edward Teach (Twelfth Planet Press), Dion Hamill
- Cover art, Australis Imaginarium (FableCroft Publishing), Shaun Tan
- Cover art, Dead Sea Fruit (Ticonderoga Publications), Olga Read
- Cover art, Savage Menace and Other Poems of Horror (P'rea Press), Andrew J McKiernan
- **"The Lost Thing" short film (Passion Pictures), Andrew Ruhemann and Shaun Tan**

=== Best Fan Writer ===
- Robert Hood, for Undead Backbrain
- Chuck McKenzie, for work in Horrorscope
- **Alexandra Pierce, for body of work including reviews at Australian Speculative Fiction in Focus**
- Tehani Wessely, for body of work including reviews at Australian Speculative Fiction in Focus

=== Best Fan Artist ===
- Rachel Holkner, for Continuum 6 props
- Dick Jenssen, for cover art of Interstellar Ramjet Scoop
- **Amanda Rainey, for Swancon 36 logo**

=== Best Fan Publication in Any Medium ===
- Australian Speculative Fiction in Focus, edited by Alisa Krasnostein et al.
- Bad Film Diaries podcast, Grant Watson
- **Galactic Suburbia podcast, Alisa Krasnostein, Tansy Rayner Roberts, and Alex Pierce**
- Terra Incognita podcast, Keith Stevenson
- The Coode Street podcast, Gary K. Wolfe and Jonathan Strahan
- The Writer and the Critic podcast, Kirstyn McDermott and Ian Mond

=== Best Achievement ===
- Lisa L. Hannett, cover design for The Girl With No Hands and Other Tales (Ticonderoga Publications)
- Helen Merrick and Andrew Milner, Academic Stream for Aussiecon 4
- Amanda Rainey, cover design for Scary Kisses (Ticonderoga Publications)
- Kyla Ward, Horror Stream and The Nightmare Ball for Aussiecon 4
- Grant Watson and Sue Ann Barber, Media Stream for Aussiecon 4
- **Alisa Krasnostein, Kathryn Linge, Rachel Holkner, Alexandra Pierce, Tansy Rayner Roberts, and Tehani Wessely, Snapshot 2010**

=== Best New Talent ===
- **Thoraiya Dyer**
- Lisa L. Hannett
- Patty Jansen
- Kathleen Jennings
- Pete Kempshall

=== William Atheling Jr Award for Criticism or Review ===
- Leigh Blackmore, for "Marvels and Horrors: Terry Dowling's Clowns at Midnight" in 21st Century Gothic (Scarecrow Press)
- Damien Broderick, for editing Skiffy and Mimesis: More Best of Australian Science Fiction Review (Wildside Press)
- Ross Murray, for "The Australian Dream Becomes Nightmare - Visions of Suburbia in Australian Science Fiction" in Andromeda Spaceways Inflight Magazine 44.
- **Tansy Rayner Roberts, for "A Modern Woman's Guide to Classic Who"**

== 2012, Continuum 8: Craftonomicon, Melbourne ==
=== Best Novel ===
- Debris (The Veiled Worlds 1), Jo Anderton (Angry Robot)
- Burn Bright, Marianne de Pierres (Random House Australia)
- The Shattered City (Creature Court 2), Tansy Rayner Roberts (HarperCollins)
- Mistification, Kaaron Warren (Angry Robot)
- **The Courier's New Bicycle, Kim Westwood (HarperCollins)**

=== Best Novella or Novelette ===
- "And the Dead Shall Outnumber the Living", Deborah Biancotti (Ishtar)
- "Above", Stephanie Campisi (Above/Below)
- **"The Past is a Bridge Best Left Burnt", Paul Haines (The Last Days of Kali Yuga)**
- "Below", Ben Peek (Above/Below)
- "Julia Agrippina's Secret Family Bestiary", Tansy Rayner Roberts (Love and Romanpunk)
- "The Sleeping and the Dead", Cat Sparks (Ishtar)

=== Best Short Story ===
- "Bad Power", Deborah Biancotti (Bad Power)
- "Breaking the Ice", Thoraiya Dyer (Cosmos 37)
- "The Last Gig of Jimmy Rucker", Martin Livings & Talie Helene (More Scary Kisses)
- **"The Patrician", Tansy Rayner Roberts (Love and Romanpunk)**
- "Alchemy", Lucy Sussex (Thief of Lives)
- "All You Can Do Is Breathe", Kaaron Warren (Blood and Other Cravings)

=== Best Collected Work ===
- Bad Power, Deborah Biancotti (Twelfth Planet)
- **The Last Days of Kali Yuga, Paul Haines (Brimstone)**
- Nightsiders, Sue Isle (Twelfth Planet)
- Ishtar, Amanda Pillar & K.V. Taylor, eds. (Gilgamesh)
- Love and Romanpunk, Tansy Rayner Roberts (Twelfth Planet)

=== Best Artwork ===
- **"Finishing School", Kathleen Jennings, in Steampunk!: An Anthology of Fantastically Rich and Strange Stories (Candlewick)**
- Cover art for The Freedom Maze (Small Beer), Kathleen Jennings

=== Best Fan Writer ===
- Bruce Gillespie, for body of work including "The Golden Age of Fanzines is Now", and SF Commentary 81 & 82
- **Robin Pen, for "The Ballad of the Unrequited Ditmar"**
- Alexandra Pierce, for body of work including reviews at Australian Speculative Fiction in Focus, Not If You Were The Last Short Story On Earth, and Randomly Yours, Alex
- Tansy Rayner Roberts, for body of work including reviews at Australian Speculative Fiction in Focus, and Not If You Were The Last Short Story On Earth
- Sean Wright, for body of work including "Authors and Social Media" series in Adventures of a Bookonaut

=== Best Fan Artist ===
- Rebecca Ing, for work in Scape
- **Kathleen Jennings, for work in Errantry, including "The Dalek Game"**
- Dick Jenssen, for body of work including work in IRS, Steam Engine Time, SF Commentary, and Scratchpad
- Lisa Rye, for "Steampunk Portal" series
- Rhianna Williams, for work in Nullas Anxietas Convention Programme Book

=== Best Fan Publication in Any Medium ===
- SF Commentary, Bruce Gillespie, ed.
- Galactic Chat podcast, Alisa Krasnostein, Tansy Rayner Roberts & Sean Wright
- Galactic Suburbia podcast, Alisa Krasnostein, Tansy Rayer Roberts, & Alex Pierce
- **The Writer and the Critic podcast, Kirstyn McDermott & Ian Mond**
- The Coode Street Podcast, Gary K. Wolfe & Jonathan Strahan

=== Best New Talent ===
- **Joanne Anderton**
- Alan Baxter
- Steve Cameron

=== William Atheling Jr. Award for Criticism or Review ===
- Russell Blackford, for "Currently reading: Jonathan Strange and Mr. Norrell by Susanna Clarke", in Metamagician and the Hellfire Club
- Damien Broderick & Van Ikin, for editing Warriors of the Tao: The Best of Science Fiction: A Review of Speculative Literature
- Liz Grzyb & Talie Helene, for "2010: The Year in Review", in The Year's Best Australian Fantasy and Horror 2010
- David McDonald, Tansy Rayner Roberts & Tehani Wessely, for "Reviewing New Who" series, in A Conversational Life
- **Alexandra Pierce & Tehani Wessely, for reviews of Vorkosigan Saga, in Randomly Yours, Alex**

== 2013, Conflux 9, Canberra ==
=== Best Novel ===
- **Sea Hearts, Margo Lanagan (Allen & Unwin)**
- Bitter Greens, Kate Forsyth (Random House Australia)
- Suited (The Veiled Worlds 2), Jo Anderton (Angry Robot)
- Salvage, Jason Nahrung (Twelfth Planet Press)
- Perfections, Kirstyn McDermott (Xoum)
- The Corpse-Rat King, Lee Battersby (Angry Robot)

=== Best Novella or Novelette ===
- "Flight 404", Simon Petrie, in Flight 404/The Hunt for Red Leicester (Peggy Bright Books)
- "Significant Dust", Margo Lanagan, in Cracklescape (Twelfth Planet Press)
- **"Sky", Kaaron Warren, in Through Splintered Walls (Twelfth Planet Press)**

=== Best Short Story ===
- "Sanaa's Army", Joanne Anderton, in Bloodstones (Ticonderoga Publications)
- **"The Wisdom of Ants", Thoraiya Dyer, in Clarkesworld 75**
- "The Bone Chime Song", Joanne Anderton, in Light Touch Paper Stand Clear (Peggy Bright Books)
- "Oracle's Tower", Faith Mudge, in To Spin a Darker Stair (FableCroft Publishing)

=== Best Collected Work ===
- Cracklescape by Margo Lanagan, edited by Alisa Krasnostein (Twelfth Planet Press)
- Epilogue, edited by Tehani Wessely (FableCroft Publishing)
- **Through Splintered Walls by Kaaron Warren, edited by Alisa Krasnostein (Twelfth Planet Press)**
- Light Touch Paper Stand Clear, edited by Edwina Harvey and Simon Petrie (Peggy Bright Books)
- Midnight and Moonshine by Lisa L. Hannett and Angela Slatter, edited by Russell B. Farr (Ticonderoga Publications)
- The Year's Best Australian Fantasy and Horror 2011, edited by Liz Grzyb and Talie Helene (Ticonderoga Publications)

=== Best Artwork ===
- Cover art, Nick Stathopoulos, for Andromeda Spaceways Inflight Magazine 56 (ASIM Collective)
- **Cover art, Kathleen Jennings, for Midnight and Moonshine (Ticonderoga Publications)**
- Illustrations, Adam Browne, for Pyrotechnicon (Coeur de Lion Publishing)
- Cover art and illustrations, Kathleen Jennings, for To Spin a Darker Stair (FableCroft Publishing)
- Cover art, Les Petersen, for Light Touch Paper Stand Clear (Peggy Bright Books)

=== Best Fan Writer ===
- Alex Pierce, for body of work including reviews in Australian Speculative Fiction in Focus
- **Tansy Rayner Roberts, for body of work including reviews in Not If You Were The Last Short Story On Earth**
- Grant Watson, for body of work including the "Who50" series in The Angriest
- Sean Wright, for body of work including reviews in Adventures of a Bookonaut

=== Best Fan Artist ===
- **Kathleen Jennings, for body of work including "The Dalek Game" and "The Tamsyn Webb Sketchbook"**

=== Best Fan Publication in Any Medium ===
- **The Writer and the Critic, Kirstyn McDermott and Ian Mond**
- Galactic Suburbia, Alisa Krasnostein, Tansy Rayner Roberts, and Alex Pierce
- Antipodean SF, Ion Newcombe
- The Coode Street Podcast, Jonathan Strahan and Gary K. Wolfe
- "Snapshot 2012", Alisa Krasnostein, Kathryn Linge, David McDonald, Helen Merrick, Ian Mond, Jason Nahrung et al.
- Australian Speculative Fiction in Focus, Alisa Krasnostein, Tehani Wessely, et al.
- Galactic Chat, Alisa Krasnostein, Tansy Rayner Roberts, and Sean Wright

=== Best New Talent ===
- **David McDonald**
- Faith Mudge
- Steve Cameron
- Stacey Larner

=== William Atheling Jr Award for Criticism or Review ===
- Alisa Krasnostein, Kathryn Linge, David McDonald, and Tehani Wessely, for review of Mira Grant's Newsflesh, in ASIF
- **Tansy Rayner Roberts, for "Historically Authentic Sexism in Fantasy. Let's Unpack That.", in tor.com**
- David McDonald, Tansy Rayner Roberts, and Tehani Wessely, for the "New Who in Conversation" series
- Liz Grzyb and Talie Helene, for "The Year in Review", in The Year's Best Australian Fantasy and Horror 2011
- Rjurik Davidson, for "An Illusion in the Game for Survival", a review of Reamde by Neal Stephenson, in The Age

== 2014, Continuum X, Melbourne ==
=== Best Novel ===
- Ink Black Magic, Tansy Rayner Roberts (FableCroft Publishing)
- **Fragments of a Broken Land: Valarl Undead, Robert Hood (Wildside Press)**
- The Beckoning, Paul Collins (Damnation Books)
- Trucksong, Andrew Macrae (Twelfth Planet Press)
- The Only Game in the Galaxy (The Maximus Black Files 3), Paul Collins (Ford Street Publishing)

=== Best Novella or Novelette ===
- "Prickle Moon", Juliet Marillier, in Prickle Moon (Ticonderoga Publications)
- "The Year of Ancient Ghosts", Kim Wilkins, in The Year of Ancient Ghosts (Ticonderoga Publications)
- "By Bone-Light", Juliet Marillier, in Prickle Moon (Ticonderoga Publications)
- **"The Home for Broken Dolls", Kirstyn McDermott, in Caution: Contains Small Parts (Twelfth Planet Press)**
- "What Amanda Wants", Kirstyn McDermott, in Caution: Contains Small Parts (Twelfth Planet Press)

=== Best Short Story ===
- "Mah Song", Joanne Anderton, in The Bone Chime Song and Other Stories (FableCroft Publishing)
- "Air, Water and the Grove", Kaaron Warren, in The Lowest Heaven (Jurassic London)
- "Seven Days in Paris", Thoraiya Dyer, in Asymmetry (Twelfth Planet Press)
- **"Scarp", Cat Sparks, in The Bride Price (Ticonderoga Publications)**
- "Not the Worst of Sins", Alan Baxter, in Beneath Ceaseless Skies 133 (Firkin Press)
- "Cold White Daughter", Tansy Rayner Roberts, in One Small Step (FableCroft Publishing)

=== Best Collected Work ===
- The Back of the Back of Beyond, Edwina Harvey, edited by Simon Petrie (Peggy Bright Books)
- Asymmetry , Thoraiya Dyer, edited by Alisa Krasnostein (Twelfth Planet Press)
- Caution: Contains Small Parts, Kirstyn McDermott, edited by Alisa Krasnostein (Twelfth Planet Press)
- The Bone Chime Song and Other Stories, Joanne Anderton, edited by Tehani Wesseley (FableCroft Publishing)
- **The Bride Price, Cat Sparks, edited by Russell B. Farr (Ticonderoga Publications)**

=== Best Artwork ===
- Cover art, Eleanor Clarke, for The Back of the Back of Beyond by Edwina Harvey (Peggy Bright Books)
- Illustrations, Kathleen Jennings, for Eclipse Online (Nightshade Books)
- Cover art, Shauna O'Meara, for Next, edited by Simon Petrie and Rob Porteous (CSFG Publishing)
- Cover art, Cat Sparks, for The Bride Price by Cat Sparks (Ticonderoga Publications)
- **Rules of Summer, Shaun Tan (Hachette Australia)**
- Cover art, Pia Ravenari, for Prickle Moon by Juliet Marillier (Ticonderoga Publications)

=== Best Fan Writer ===
- Tsana Dolichva, for body of work, including reviews and interviews in Tsana's Reads and Reviews
- **Sean Wright, for body of work, including reviews in Adventures of a Bookonaut**
- Grant Watson, for body of work, including reviews in The Angriest
- Foz Meadows, for body of work, including reviews in Shattersnipe: Malcontent & Rainbows
- Alexandra Pierce, for body of work, including reviews in Randomly Yours, Alex
- Tansy Rayner Roberts, for body of work, including essays and reviews at www.tansyrr.com

=== Best Fan Artist ===
- Nalini Haynes, for body of work, including "Defender of the Faith", "The Suck Fairy", "Doctor Who vampire" and "The Last Cyberman" in Dark Matter
- **Kathleen Jennings, for body of work, including "Illustration Friday"**
- Dick Jenssen, for body of work, including cover art for Interstellar Ramjet Scoop and SF Commentary

=== Best Fan Publication in Any Medium ===
- Dark Matter Zine, Nalini Haynes
- SF Commentary, Bruce Gillespie
- The Writer and the Critic, Kirstyn McDermott and Ian Mond
- **Galactic Chat Podcast, Sean Wright, Alex Pierce, Helen Stubbs, David McDonald, and Mark Webb**
- The Coode Street Podcast, Gary K. Wolfe and Jonathan Strahan
- Galactic Suburbia, Alisa Krasnostein, Alex Pierce, and Tansy Rayner Roberts

=== Best New Talent ===
- Michelle Goldsmith
- **Zena Shapter**
- Faith Mudge
- Jo Spurrier
- Stacey Larner

=== William Atheling Jr Award for Criticism or Review ===
- Reviews in Randomly Yours, Alex, Alexandra Pierce
- "Things Invisible: Human and Ab-Human in Two of Hodgson's Carnacki stories", Leigh Blackmore, in Sargasso: The Journal of William Hope Hodgson Studies #1 edited by Sam Gafford (Ulthar Press)
- **Galactic Suburbia Episode 87: Saga Spoilerific Book Club, Alisa Krasnostein, Alex Pierce, and Tansy Rayner Roberts**
- **The Reviewing New Who series, David McDonald, Tansy Rayner Roberts, and Tehani Wessely**
- "A Puppet's Parody of Joy: Dolls, Puppets and Mannikins as Diabolical Other", Leigh Blackmore, in Ramsey Campbell: Critical Essays on the Master of Modern Horror edited by Gary William Crawford (Scarecrow Press)
- "That was then, this is now: how my perceptions have changed", George Ivanoff, in Doctor Who and Race edited by Lindy Orthia (Intellect Books)

== 2015, Swancon 40, Perth ==
=== Best Novel ===
- **The Lascar's Dagger, Glenda Larke (Hachette)**
- Bound (Alex Caine 1), Alan Baxter (Voyager)
- Clariel, Garth Nix (HarperCollins)
- **Thief's Magic (Millennium's Rule 1), Trudi Canavan (Hachette Australia)**
- The Godless (Children 1), Ben Peek (Tor UK)

=== Best Novella or Novelette ===
- "The Ghost of Hephaestus", Charlotte Nash, in Phantazein (FableCroft Publishing)
- **"The Legend Trap", Sean Williams, in Kaleidoscope (Twelfth Planet Press)**
- "The Darkness in Clara", Alan Baxter, in SQ Mag 14 (IFWG Publishing Australia)
- "St Dymphna's School for Poison Girls", Angela Slatter, in Review of Australian Fiction, Volume 9, Issue 3 (Review of Australian Fiction)
- "The Female Factory", Lisa L. Hannett and Angela Slatter, in The Female Factory (Twelfth Planet Press)
- "Escapement", Stephanie Gunn, in Kisses by Clockwork (Ticonderoga Publications)

=== Best Short Story ===
- "Bahamut", Thoraiya Dyer, in Phantazein (FableCroft Publishing)
- "Vanilla", Dirk Flinthart, in Kaleidoscope (Twelfth Planet Press)
- "Cookie Cutter Superhero", Tansy Rayner Roberts, in Kaleidoscope(Twelfth Planet Press)
- **"The Seventh Relic", Cat Sparks, in Phantazein (FableCroft Publishing)**
- "Signature", Faith Mudge, in Kaleidoscope (Twelfth Planet Press)

=== Best Collected Work ===
- **Kaleidoscope, edited by Alisa Krasnostein and Julia Rios (Twelfth Planet Press)**
- The Year's Best Australian Fantasy and Horror 2013, edited by Liz Grzyb and Talie Helene (Ticonderoga Publications)
- Phantazein, edited by Tehani Wessely (FableCroft Publishing)

=== Best Artwork ===
- Illustrations, Kathleen Jennings, in Black-Winged Angels (Ticonderoga Publications)
- **Cover art, Kathleen Jennings, of Phantazein (FableCroft Publishing)**
- Illustrations, Kathleen Jennings, in The Bitterwood Bible and Other Recountings (Tartarus Press)

=== Best Fan Writer ===
- **Tansy Rayner Roberts, for body of work**
- Tsana Dolichva, for body of work
- Bruce Gillespie, for body of work
- Katharine Stubbs, for body of work
- Alexandra Pierce for body of work
- Grant Watson, for body of work
- Sean Wright, for body of work

=== Best Fan Artist ===
- Nalini Haynes, for body of work, including "Interstellar Park Ranger Bond, Jaime Bond", "Gabba and Slave Lay-off: Star Wars explains Australian politics", "The Driver", and "Unmasked" in Dark Matter Zine
- **Kathleen Jennings, for body of work, including Fakecon art and Illustration Friday series**
- Nick Stathopoulos, for movie poster of It Grows!

=== Best Fan Publication in Any Medium ===
- "Snapshot 2014", Tsana Dolichva, Nick Evans, Stephanie Gunn, Kathryn Linge, Elanor Matton-Johnson, David McDonald, Helen Merrick, Jason Nahrung, Ben Payne, Alex Pierce, Tansy Rayner Roberts, Helen Stubbs, Katharine Stubbs, Tehani Wessely, and Sean Wright
- It Grows!, Nick Stathopoulos
- Galactic Suburbia, Alisa Krasnostein, Alexandra Pierce, Tansy Rayner Roberts, and Andrew Finch
- **The Writer and the Critic, Kirstyn McDermott and Ian Mond**
- Galactic Chat, Sean Wright, Helen Stubbs, David McDonald, Alexandra Pierce, Sarah Parker, and Mark Webb

=== Best New Talent ===
- **Helen Stubbs**
- Shauna O'Meara
- Michelle Goldsmith

=== William Atheling Jr Award for Criticism or Review ===
- Reviews in The Angriest, Grant Watson
- The Eddings Reread series, Tehani Wessely, Jo Anderton, and Alexandra Pierce, in A Conversational Life
- Reviews in Adventures of a Bookonaut, Sean Wright
- **"Does Sex Make Science Fiction Soft?", in Uncanny Magazine 1, Tansy Rayner Roberts**
- Reviews in FictionMachine, Grant Watson
- The Reviewing New Who series, David McDonald, Tansy Rayner Roberts, and Tehani Wessely

== 2016, Contact2016, Brisbane ==
=== Best Novel ===
- The Dagger's Path, Glenda Larke (Orbit)
- Day Boy, Trent Jamieson (Text Publishing)
- Graced, Amanda Pillar (Momentum)
- **Lament for the Afterlife, Lisa L. Hannett (ChiZine Publications)**
- Zeroes, Scott Westerfeld, Margo Lanagan, and Deborah Biancotti (Simon and Schuster)

=== Best Novella or Novelette ===
- "The Cherry Crow Children of Haverny Wood", Deborah Kalin, in Cherry Crow Children (Twelfth Planet Press)
- "Fake Geek Girl", Tansy Rayner Roberts, in Review of Australian Fiction, volume 14, issue 4 (Review of Australian Fiction)
- "Hot Rods", Cat Sparks, in Lightspeed Science Fiction & Fantasy 58 (Lightspeed Science Fiction & Fantasy)
- "The Miseducation of Mara Lys", Deborah Kalin, in Cherry Crow Children (Twelfth Planet Press)
- **"Of Sorrow and Such", Angela Slatter, in Of Sorrow and Such (Tor.com)**
- "The Wages of Honey", Deborah Kalin, in Cherry Crow Children (Twelfth Planet Press)

=== Best Short Story ===
- "2B", Joanne Anderton, in Insert Title Here (FableCroft Publishing)
- "The Chart of the Vagrant Mariner", Alan Baxter, in Fantasy & Science Fiction, Jan/Feb 2015 (Fantasy & Science Fiction)
- **"A Hedge of Yellow Roses", Kathleen Jennings, in Hear Me Roar (Ticonderoga Publications)**
- "Look how cold my hands are", Deborah Biancotti, in Cranky Ladies of History (FableCroft Publishing)

=== Best Collected Work ===
- Bloodlines, Amanda Pillar (Ticonderoga Publications)
- Cherry Crow Children, Deborah Kalin, edited by Alisa Krasnostein (Twelfth Planet Press)
- **Cranky Ladies of History, Tansy Rayner Roberts and Tehani Wessely (FableCroft Publishing)**
- Letters to Tiptree, Alexandra Pierce and Alisa Krasnostein (Twelfth Planet Press)
- Peripheral Visions: The Collected Ghost Stories by Robert Hood (IFWG Publishing Australia)

=== Best Artwork ===
- Cover art, Rovina Cai, for "Tom, Thom" (Tor.com)
- Cover art, Kathleen Jennings, for Bloodlines (Ticonderoga Publications)
- **Cover and internal artwork, Kathleen Jennings, for Cranky Ladies of History (FableCroft Publishing)**
- Cover, Shauna O'Meara, for The Never Never Land (CSFG Publishing)
- Illustrations, Shaun Tan, for The Singing Bones (Allen & Unwin)

=== Best Fan Publication in any Medium ===
- The Angriest, Grant Watson
- The Coode Street Podcast, Jonathan Strahan and Gary K. Wolfe
- **Galactic Suburbia, Alisa Krasnostein, Alexandra Pierce, and Tansy Rayner Roberts**
- SF Commentary, Bruce Gillespie
- The Writer and the Critic, Kirstyn McDermott and Ian Mond

=== Best Fan Writer ===
- Tsana Dolichva, for body of work, including reviews and interviews in Tsana's Reads and Reviews
- Foz Meadows, for body of work, including reviews in Shattersnipe: Malcontent & Rainbows
- Ian Mond, for body of work, including The Hysterical Hamster
- Alexandra Pierce, for body of work, including reviews in Randomly Yours, Alex
- Katharine Stubbs, for body of work, including Venture Adlaxre
- **Grant Watson, for body of work, including reviews in The Angriest**

=== Best Fan Artist ===
- **Kathleen Jennings, for body of work, including Illustration Friday**
- Belinda Morris, for body of work, including Belinda Illustrates

=== Best New Talent ===
- **Rivqa Rafael**
- T. R. Napper
- D. K. Mok
- Liz Barr

=== William Atheling Jr. Award for Criticism or Review ===
- **Letters to Tiptree, Alexandra Pierce and Alisa Krasnostein (Twelfth Planet Press)**
- The Rereading the Empire Trilogy review series, Tansy Rayner Roberts
- The Reviewing New Who series, David McDonald, Tansy Rayner Roberts and Tehani Wessely
- "Sara Kingdom dies at the end", Tansy Rayner Roberts in Companion Piece (Mad Norwegian Press)
- "SF Women of the 20th Century", Tansy Rayner Roberts
- Squeeing over Supergirl, David McDonald and Tehani Wessely series

== 2017: Continuum 13, Melbourne ==
=== Best Novel ===
- **The Grief Hole, Kaaron Warren, IFWG Publishing Australia.**
- The Lyre Thief, Jennifer Fallon, HarperCollins.
- Squid's Grief, D.K. Mok, D.K. Mok.
- Vigil, Angela Slatter, Jo Fletcher Books.
- The Wizardry of Jewish Women, Gillian Polack, Satalyte Publishing.

=== Best Novella or Novelette ===
- "All the Colours of the Tomato", Simon Petrie, in Dimension6 9.
- "By the Laws of Crab and Woman", Jason Fischer, in Review of Australian Fiction, Vol 17, Issue 6.
- **"Did We Break the End of the World?", Tansy Rayner Roberts, in Defying Doomsday, Twelfth Planet Press.**
- "Finnegan's Field", Angela Slatter, in Tor.com.
- "Glass Slipper Scandal", Tansy Rayner Roberts, in Sheep Might Fly.
- "Going Viral", Thoraiya Dyer, in Dimension6 8.

=== Best Short Story ===
- "Flame Trees", T.R. Napper, in Asimov's Science Fiction, April/May 2016.
- **"No Fat Chicks", Cat Sparks, in In Your Face, FableCroft Publishing.**
- "There's No Place Like Home", Edwina Harvey, in AntipodeanSF 221.

=== Best Collected Work ===
- Crow Shine by Alan Baxter, Ticonderoga Publications.
- **Defying Doomsday, Tsana Dolichva and Holly Kench, Twelfth Planet Press.**
- **Dreaming in the Dark, Jack Dann, PS Publishing.**
- In Your Face, Tehani Wessely, FableCroft Publishing.

=== Best Artwork ===
- cover and internal artwork, Adam Browne, for The Tame Animals of Saturn, Peggy Bright Books.
- **illustration, Shauna O'Meara, for Lackington's 12.**

=== Best Fan Writer ===
- James 'Jocko' Allen, for body of work.
- Aidan Doyle, for body of work.
- Bruce Gillespie, for body of work.
- **Foz Meadows, for body of work.**
- Tansy Rayner Roberts, for body of work.

=== Best Fan Artist ===
- Kathleen Jennings, for body of work, including Illustration Friday series.
- **No award presented**

=== Best Fan Publication in Any Medium ===
- **2016 Australian SF Snapshot, Greg Chapman, Tehani Croft, Tsana Dolichva, Marisol Dunham, Elizabeth Fitzgerald, Stephanie Gunn, Ju Landéesse, David McDonald, Belle McQuattie, Matthew Morrison, Alex Pierce, Rivqa Rafael, Tansy Rayner Roberts, Helen Stubbs, Katharine Stubbs and Matthew Summers.**
- The Coode Street Podcast, Jonathan Strahan and Gary K. Wolfe
- Earl Grey Editing Services (blog), Elizabeth Fitzgerald.
- Galactic Chat, Alexandra Pierce, David McDonald, Sarah Parker, Helen Stubbs, Mark Webb, and Sean Wright.
- Galactic Suburbia, Alisa Krasnostein, Alex Pierce, and Tansy Rayner Roberts.
- The Writer and the Critic, Kirstyn McDermott and Ian Mond.

=== Best New Talent ===
- T R Napper
- **Marlee Jane Ward**

=== William Atheling Jr Award for Criticism or Review ===
- Kat Clay for essays and reviews in Weird Fiction Review
- Tehani Croft & Marisol Dunham, for Revisiting Pern: the great McCaffrey reread review series.
- Tsana Dolichva, for reviews, in Tsana's Reads and Reviews.
- **Kate Forsyth, for The Rebirth of Rapunzel: a mythic biography of the maiden in the tower, FableCroft Publishing.**
- Ian Mond, for reviews, in The Hysterical Hamster.
- Alexandra Pierce, for reviews, in Randomly Yours, Alex.
- Gillian Polack, for History and Fiction: Writers, their Research, Worlds and Stories, Peter Lang.

== 2018: Swancon 2018, Perth ==
=== Best Novel ===
- Corpselight, Angela Slatter, Hachette Australia.
- **Crossroads of Canopy, Thoraiya Dyer, Tor.**
- How to Bee, Bren MacDibble, Allen & Unwin.
- In the Dark Spaces, Cally Black, Hardie Grant Egmont.
- Lotus Blue, Cat Sparks, Skyhorse Publishing.

=== Best Novella or Novelette ===
- "Island Green", Shauna O'Meara, in Ecopunk!, Ticonderoga Publications.
- **"Girl Reporter", Tansy Rayner Roberts, in Girl Reporter, Book Smugglers Publishing.**
- "Matters Arising from the Identification of the Body", Simon Petrie, in Matters Arising from the Identification of the Body, Peggy Bright Books.
- "Monkey Business", Janeen Webb, in Ecopunk!, Ticonderoga Publications.
- "My Sister's Ghost", Kate Forsyth and Kim Wilkins, in The Silver Well, Ticonderoga Publications.

=== Best Short Story ===
- "A Harem of Six Legs", Edwina Harvey, in An Eclectic Collection of Stuff and Things, Peggy Bright Books.
- "Mr Mycelium", Claire McKenna, in Ecopunk!, Ticonderoga Publications.
- **"A Pearl Beyond Price", Janeen Webb in Cthulhu Deep Down-Under Vol 1, IFWG Publishing Australia.**
- "Prayers to Broken Stone", Cat Sparks, in Kaleidotrope, Spring 2017.
- "Trivalent" by Rivqa Rafael, in Ecopunk!, Ticonderoga Publications.

=== Best Collected Work ===
- An Eclectic Collection of Stuff and Things by Edwina Harvey, Peggy Bright Books.
- **Ecopunk!, Cat Sparks and Liz Grzyb, Ticonderoga Publications.**
- The Silver Well, Kate Forsyth and Kim Wilkins, Ticonderoga Publications.
- Singing My Sister Down and other stories by Margo Lanagan, Allen & Unwin.

=== Best Artwork ===
- **Cover art, Lewis Morley, for Matters Arising from the Identification of the Body, Peggy Bright Books.**
- The Grief Hole Illustrated: An Artist's Sketchbook Companion to Kaaron Warren's Supernatural Thriller, Keely Van Order, IFWG Publishing Australia.

=== Best Fan Publication in any Medium ===
- Earl Grey Editing (blog), Elizabeth Fitzgerald.
- Galactic Suburbia, Alisa Krasnostein, Alexandra Pierce, Tansy Rayner Roberts.
- No Award (blog), Liz Barr and Stephanie Lai.
- **SF Commentary, edited by Bruce Gillespie.**
- The Writer and the Critic, Kirstyn McDermott and Ian Mond.

=== Best Fan Writer ===
- Elizabeth Fitzgerald, for writing at Earl Grey Editing.
- Leigh Edmonds, for writing in iOTA.
- Liz Barr, for writing at No Award.
- **Stephanie Lai, for writing at No Award.**

=== Best Fan Artist ===
- **Shauna O'Meara, for "How to Bee"** (based on the novel by Bren MacDibble).

=== Best New Talent ===
- Claire G. Coleman
- **Stephanie Lai**

=== William Atheling Jr. Award for Criticism or Review ===
- Liz Barr, for Star Trek: Discovery reviews, in No Award.
- Russell Blackford, for Science Fiction and the Moral Imagination: Visions, Minds, Ethics, Springer.
- **Ambelin Kwaymullina, for "Reflecting on Indigenous Worlds, Indigenous Futurisms and Artificial Intelligence", Twelfth Planet Press.**
- Alexandra Pierce and Mimi Mondal, for Luminescent Threads: Connections to Octavia E. Butler, Twelfth Planet Press.
- Cat Sparks, for "Science fiction and climate fiction: contemporary literatures of purpose", in Ecopunk! Speculative tales of radical futures, Ticonderoga Publications.

== 2019: Continuum 15, Melbourne ==
=== Best Novel ===
- Devouring Dark, Alan Baxter, Grey Matter Press.
- The Subjugate, Amanda Bridgeman, Angry Robot.
- Faerie Apocalypse, Jason Franks, IFWG Publishing Australia.
- **City of Lies (Poison Wars 1), Sam Hawke, Tom Doherty Associates.**
- The Beast's Heart, Leife Shallcross, Hodder & Stoughton.
- Tide of Stone, Kaaron Warren, Omnium Gatherum.

=== Best Novella or Novelette ===
- "Triquetra", Kirstyn McDermott, in Triquetra, Tor.com.
- **"Cabaret of Monsters", Tansy Rayner Roberts, in Cabaret of Monsters, The Creature Court**.
- "The Dragon's Child", Janeen Webb, in The Dragon's Child, PS Publishing.

=== Best Short Story ===
- "The Art of Broken Things", Joanne Anderton, in Mother of Invention, Twelfth Planet Press.
- "A Man Totally Alone", Robert Hood, The Mammoth Book of Halloween Stories: Terrifying Tales Set on the Scariest Night of the Year!, Skyhorse Publishing.
- **"The Heart of Owl Abbas", Kathleen Jennings, in Tor.com.**
- "Junkyard Kraken", D.K. Mok, in Mother of Invention, Twelfth Planet Press.

=== Best Collected Work ===
- Sword and Sonnet, edited by Aidan Doyle, Rachael K. Jones and E. Catherine Tobler, Ate Bit Bear.
- Mountains of the Mind, Gillian Pollack, Shooting Star Press.
- **Mother of Invention, Rivqa Rafael and Tansy Rayner Roberts, Twelfth Planet Press.**
- A Hand of Knaves, Leife Shallcross and Chris Large, CSFG Publishing.
- Tales from the Inner City, Shaun Tan, Allen & Unwin.

=== Best Artwork ===
- **Cover art, Likhain, for Mother of Invention, Twelfth Planet Press.**
- Cover and internal illustrations, Shauna O'Meara, for A Hand of Knaves, CSFG Publishing.

=== Best Fan Publication in Any Medium ===
- **Earl Grey Editing, Elizabeth Fitzgerald.**
- Pratchat, Elizabeth Flux, Ben McKenzie, Splendid Chaps Productions.
- SF Commentary, Bruce Gillespie.
- Galactic Suburbia, Alisa Krasnostein, Alexandra Pierce, and Tansy Rayner Roberts.

=== Best Fan Writer ===
- **Liz Barr, for writing in squiddishly.**
- Bruce Gillespie, for writing in SF Commentary and ANZAPA articles.

=== Best New Talent ===
- Elizabeth Fitzgerald
- **Sam Hawke**
- Bren MacDibble (aka Cally Black)
- Leife Shallcross

=== William Atheling Jr Award for Criticism or Review ===
- Damien Broderick, for Pscience Fiction, McFarland.
- Damien Broderick, for Consciousness and Science Fiction, Springer.
- Tansy Rayner Roberts, for Gentlewomen of the Press, Sheep Might Fly.
- **Cat Sparks, for "The 21st Century Catastrophe: Hyper-capitalism and Severe Climate Change in Science Fiction" PhD exegesis.**

== 2020: Swancon 2020, Perth ==
(The convention was cancelled.) There were insufficient nominations for the Best Artwork and Best Fan Artist categories.

There was a preliminary ballot on which Bruce Gillespie was nominated for Best Fan Writer "for writing in SF Commentary and ANZAPA articles".

=== Best Novel ===
- Claiming T-Mo, Eugen Bacon, Meerkat Press.
- **The Year of the Fruit Cake, Gillian Polack, IFWG Publishing Australia.**

=== Best Short Fiction ===
- "into bones like oil", Kaaron Warren, in Into Bones like Oil, Meerkat Press.
- **"Whom My Soul Loves", Rivqa Rafael, in Strange Horizons, 11 November 2019.**

=== Best Collected Work ===
- **Collision, J.S. Breukelaar, Meerkat Press.**

=== Best Fan Publication in Any Medium ===
- **Be The Serpent podcast, Alexandra Rowland, Jennifer Mace and Freya Marske.**
- **SF Commentary, Bruce Gillespie.**

=== Best Fan Writer ===
- Bruce Gillespie, for writing in SF Commentary.
- **Elizabeth Fitzgerald, for reviews in Skiffy and Fanty.**

=== Best New Talent ===
- **Freya Marske.**

=== William Atheling Jr. Award for Criticism or Review ===
- Eugen Bacon, for Writing Speculative Fiction, Red Globe Press.
- **Grant Watson, for reviews on FictionMachine.**

== 2021: Conflux, Canberra ==
(The convention was cancelled.)

=== Best Novel ===
- **The Left-Handed Booksellers of London, Garth Nix (Allen & Unwin)**
- The Crying Forest, Venero Armanno (IFWG Publishing Australia)
- Hollow Empire, Sam Hawke (Penguin)
- The Animals in That Country, Laura Jean McKay (Scribe)
- Monstrous Heart, Claire McKenna (HarperCollins)
- Poison & Light, Gillian Polack (Shooting Star)
- Repo Virtual, Corey J. White (Tor)

=== Best Novella or Novelette ===
- **Flyaway, Kathleen Jennings (Pan Macmillan Australia)**
- “The Attic Tragedy”, J. Ashley-Smith (The Attic Tragedy)
- The Roo, Alan Baxter (self-published)
- “Bad Weather”, Robert Hood (Outback Horrors Down Under)
- “The Weight of the Air, The Weight of the World”, T.R. Napper, (Neon Leviathan)

=== Best Short Story ===
- **“The Calenture”, Kaaron Warren (Of Gods and Globes 2)**
- “The Genetic Alchemist’s Daughter, Elaine Cuyegkeng (Black Cranes: Tales of Unquiet Women)
- “Hacking Santorini”, Cat Sparks (Dark Harvest)

=== Best Collected Work ===
- **Dark Harvest, Cat Sparks (NewCon)**
- Rebuilding Tomorrow, Tsana Dolichva (Twelfth Planet)
- The Zookeeper's Tales of Interstellar Oddities, Aiki Flinthart & Pamela Jeffs (CAT)
- Songs for Dark Seasons, Lisa L. Hannett (Ticonderoga)
- Neon Leviathan, T.R. Napper (Grimdark)

=== Best Artwork ===
- **Kathleen Jennings for illustrations in Mother Thorn and other tales of courage and kindness (Serenity)**
- Keely Van Order for the cover of Drive, She Said by Tracie McBride (IFWG Publishing Australia)
- Rovina Cai for illustrations in The Giant and the Sea (Lothian)

=== Best Fan Publication in Any Medium ===
- **The Coode Street Podcast, Jonathan Strahan & Gary K. Wolfe**
- Pratchat, Elizabeth Flux & Ben McKenzie (Splendid Chaps)
- Ethel the Aardvark, LynC (Melbourne Science Fiction Club)
- The AntipodeanSF Radio Show, Ion Newcombe

=== Best Fan Writer ===
- **Bruce Gillespie for writing in SF Commentary**
- LynC for writing in Ethel the Aardvark

=== Best Fan Artist ===
- **Lyss Wickramasinghe for fanart on Tumblr including Elsie, Hold On, The Gem and the Other, and Vesuvia Pride**

=== Best New Talent ===
- **Nikky Lee**

=== William Atheling, Jr. Award for Criticism or Review ===
- **Terry Frost for reviews in Terry Talks Movies**
- Kathleen Jennings for “Contracts and Calcifer, or ‘In Which A Contract Is Concluded Before Witnesses’: the transactional structure of Howl's Moving Castle”, The Proceedings of the Diana Wynne Jones Conference, Bristol 2019 [paper published 2020]
- Grant Watson for reviews in FictionMachine

Some categories had more than five nominees due to ties, and some had fewer due to insufficient nominations.

== 2022: Conflux 16, Canberra ==
=== Best Novel ===
- **The Bridge, J.S. Breukelaar (Meerkat)**
- The Councillor, E.J. Beaton (DAW)
- Papa Lucy & The Boneman, Jason Fischer (Outland)
- The Rose Daughter, Maria Lewis (Hachette Australia/Little Brown)
- A Marvellous Light, Freya Marske (Tor)
- She Who Became the Sun, Shelley Parker-Chan (Tor)
- All the Murmuring Bones, A.G. Slatter (Titan)

=== Best Novella or Novelette ===
- **Ariadne, I Love You, J. Ashley-Smith (Meerkat)**
- Ghost Recall, Alan Baxter (Grey Matter)
- Dirty Heads, Aaron Dries (Black T-Shirt)
- "The Little One", Rebecca Fraser (Coralesque and Other Tales to Disturb and Distract)
- "A Vast Silence", T.R. Napper (F&SF, November/December 2021)

=== Best Short Story ===
- **"The King in Yella", Kaaron Warren (Under Twin Suns: Alternate Histories of the Yellow Sign)**
- "Goon of Fortune", Geneve Flynn (Midnight Echo, November 2021)
- "Legacy of the Species", Pamela Jeffs (The Terralight Collection)
- "The House That Hungers", Maria Lewis (Aurealis, November 2021)
- "A Good Big Brother", Matt Tighe (Spawn: Weird Tales of Pregnancy, Birth and Babies)
- "A Whisper in the Death Pit", Kyla Lee Ward (Weirdbook, May 2021)

=== Best Collected Work ===
- **Tool Tales, Ellen Datlow & Kaaron Warren (IFWG Australia)**
- The Gulp, Alan Baxter (self-published)
- Relics, Wrecks & Ruins, Aiki Flinthart (CAT)
- Coralesque and Other Tales To Disturb and Distract, Rebecca Fraser (IFWG Australia)
- The Terralight Collection, Pamela Jeffs (Four Ink)

=== Best Fan Publication in Any Medium ===
- **Earl Grey Editing**, Elizabeth Fitzgerald
- SF Commentary, Bruce Gillespie

=== Best Fan Writer ===
- **Kat Clay, for interviews and reviews on YouTube and katclay.com**

=== Best Fan Artist ===
- **C.H. Pearce, for fanart on Instagram, including "Em and Gyre", "Lysande", "Cruelty Free", and "Rocket Launch Good"**

=== William Atheling, Jr. Award for Criticism or Review ===
- **Ian Mond, for reviews in Locus**
- Eugen Bacon, for Aurealis reviews (editor and reviewer)
- Claire Fitzpatrick, for "How Mary Shelley Continues to Influence Modern Science Fiction" (Aurealis 145)
- Andrew Nette & Iain McIntyre, for editing Dangerous Visions and New Worlds: Radical Science Fiction, 1950 to 1985 (PM Press)
- Kyla Lee Ward, for "Vampire Poetry" (Penumbra 2)

== 2023: Conflux 17, Canberra ==
Results of the preliminary ballot were declared in August, with the winners announced on 30 September 2023:

=== Best Novel ===
- Sallow Bend, Alan Baxter (Cemetery Dance)
- X-Dimensional Assassin Zai Through the Unfolded Earth, Jason Franks (IFWG)
- Scavengers, Robert Hood, (Clan Destine)
- The Stone Road, Trent Jamieson (Erewhon)
- **36 Streets, T.R. Napper (Titan)**

=== Best Novella or Novelette ===
- "Gulpepper Curios", Alan Baxter (The Fall)
- The Dark Matter of Natasha, Matthew R. Davis (Grey Matter)
- Bluebells, Leanbh Pearson (Black Hare)
- **"Remnants and Bad Water", Kaaron Warren (Damnation Games)**
- **"The Smell of Waiting", Kaaron Warren (Screams from the Dark)**

=== Best Short Story ===
- "Greatheart", Juliet Marillier (The Art of Being Human)
- "The Quick Study", C.H. Pearce (Etherea 10)
- **"Everything so slow and quiet", Kaaron Warren (The Art of Being Human)**
- "Songs We Sing at Sea are the Lies We Tell Ourselves", Kaaron Warren (Looming Low 2)

=== Best Collected Work ===
- Damnation Games, Alan Baxter, ed. (Clan Destine)
- The Fall, Alan Baxter (13th Dragon)
- Phase Change, Matthew Chrulew, ed. (Twelfth Planet)
- The Art of Being Human, Tehani Croft & Stephanie Lai, eds. (FableCroft)
- **Cut to Care: A Collection of Little Hurts, Aaron Dries (IFWG)**
- Midnight Echo 17

=== Best Fan Publication in Any Medium ===
- Ethel the Aardvark, LynC, ed.
- **Pratchat Podcast, Ben McKenzie & Elizabeth Flux**

=== Best Fan Writer ===
- **Kat Clay**
- Bruce Gillespie
- David Grigg
- Perry Middlemiss

=== Best Fan Artist ===
- Erin-Claire Barrow
- **C.H. Pearce**
- David L Russell

=== Best New Talent ===
- Zachary Ashford
- **Aaron Dries**
- C.H. Pearce
- Leanbh Pearson
- C.Z. Tacks
- Matt Tighe

=== William Atheling, Jr. Award for Criticism or Review ===
- Eugen Bacon, for An Earnest Blackness (Anti-Oedipus)
- Angharad Lodwick, for Tinted Edges
- **Ian Mond, for reviews in Locus**
- Gillian Polack, for Story Matrices: Cultural Encoding and Cultural Baggage in Science Fiction and Fantasy (Luna)

== 2024: Continuum 16, Melbourne ==
Nominations were opened on the last day of the Natcon. A preliminary ballot was released in September. Awards were presented at Conflux.

=== Best Novel ===
- Polyphemus', Zachary Ashford (DarkLit)
- The Tangled Lands, Glenda Larke (Wizard's Tower)
- **The Sinister Booksellers of Bath, Garth Nix (Allen & Unwin)**
- Dream Weaver, Steven Paulsen (IFWG)
- When Dark Roots Hunt, Zena Shapter (MidnightSun)
- Traitor’s Run, Keith Stevenson (coeur de lion)

=== Best Novella or Novelette ===
- "The Measure of Sorrow", J. Ashley-Smith (The Measure of Sorrow: Stories)
- "The Leaves Forget", Alan Baxter (The Leaves Forget)
- "Quicksilver", J.S. Breukelaar (Vandal: Stories of Damage)
- "Eight or Die", Thoraiya Dyer (Clarkesworld November 2023 – December 2023)
- "A Marked Man", T.R. Napper (Grimdark October 2023)
- **"Bitters", Kaaron Warren (Bitters, Cemetery Dance)**
- "The Deathplace Set", Kaaron Warren (Vandal: Stories of Damage)

=== Best Short Story ===
- "Highway Requiem", T.R. Napper (F&SF May–June 2023)
- **"Jimmy Flip Brings His Little One to Work, and It Comes My Turn to Hold It", C.H. Pearce (Body of Work)**
- "Antarctica Starts Here", Lucy Sussex (Overland Autumn 2023)
- "There Are Things on Me", Matt Tighe (Killer Creatures Down Under)
- "Trial by Fire", Matt Tighe (Etherea Magazine Winter 2023)

=== Best Collected Work ===
- **The Measure of Sorrow: Stories, J. Ashley-Smith (Meerkat)**
- This Fresh Hell, Katya de Becerra & Narrelle M. Harris, eds. (Clan Destine Press)
- Body of Work, C.Z. Tacks, ed. (CSFG)
- Vandal: Stories of Damage, Kaaron Warren, Aaron Dries, J.S. Breukelaar (Crystal Lake)

=== Best Artwork ===
- Cover art, Greg Chapman for Polyphemus (DarkLit Press)
- Illustrations and cover art, Marc McBride for Glow (Allen & Unwin)
- Illustrations, Steve Simpson for Texture of Silence (Independent Legions Publishing)
- **Cover art, Meg Wright (Red Wallflower) for Midnight Echo 18**

=== Best Fan Writer ===
- **Leigh Edmonds**
- Bruce Gillespie
- Jan MacNally
- Perry Middlemiss

=== Best Fan Artist ===
- Stella Marie
- **C.H. Pearce**
- David L. Russell
- Lyss Wickramasinghe

=== Best Fan Publication in Any Medium ===
- Ethel the Aardvark
- **Let the Cat In**
- SF Commentary
- Terry Talks Movies
- The Writer and the Critic

=== Best New Talent ===
- **C.H. Pearce**
- Leanbh Pearson
- C.Z. Tacks

=== William Atheling Jr Award for Criticism or Review ===
- **Claire Fitzpatrick, ed., A Vindication of Monsters: Essays on Mary Shelley and Mary Wollstonecraft (IFWG Publishing)**
- Claire Fitzpatrick, "The Continuing Longevity of Speculative Fiction Spin-offs" (Aurealis April 2023)
- Ian Mond, for reviews in Locus
- Gillian Polack, "An Introduction to Dr Nikola, Guy Boothby’s Infamous Invention" (Aurealis September 2023)

== 2025: Conflux 19, Canberra ==
Winners were announced at the 2025 Ditmar Awards ceremony, hosted during Conflux 19, held October 3-6, 2025 in Canberra, Australia.

=== Best Novel ===
- **The Underhistory, Kaaron Warren (Serpent’s Tail)**
- Blood Covenant, Alan Baxter (Cemetery Dance)
- Ghost Cities, Siang Lu (University of Queensland Press)
- The Medusa Situation, Gabiann Marin (Clan Destine)
- The Escher Man, T. R. Napper (Titan)

=== Best Novella or Novelette ===
- '**Ghost of the Neon God', T. R. Napper (Titan)**
- Wilder, Pamela Jeffs (Four Ink)
- Cruel Nights, Jason Nahrung (Brain Jar)
- “Maleficium”, Kyla Lee Ward (Discontinue if Death Ensues)
- “The Emporium”, Kaaron Warren (Calvaria Fell)
- Shattered, Pauline Yates (Black Hare)

=== Best Short Story ===
- **“Bellow of the Steamship Cow”, Aaron Dries (Where the Silent Ones Watch)**
- “Archive of the Dead”, Pamela Jeffs (SNAFU: AI Insurrection)
- “The Market of Loss”, Matt Tighe (Aurealis 11/24)
- “Bright Hearts”, Kaaron Warren (Reactor 10/16/24)

=== Best Collected Work ===
- **Calvaria Fell, Cat Sparks & Kaaron Warren (Meerkat)**
- Nightmare Logic: Tales of the Macabre, Fantastic and *Cthulhuesque, Leigh Blackmore (IFWG)
- Monsters in the Mills, Christa Carmen & L.E. Daniels (Glass House)
- Kindling, Kathleen Jennings (Small Beer)

=== Best Artwork ===
- **C.H. Pearce for the cover art of in the aftermath (Prismatica)**
- Greg Chapman for the cover art of Black Days & Bloody Nights (IFWG)
- Kathleen Jennings for the cover art of Kindling (Small Beer)
- Meg Wright (Red Wallflower) for the cover art of The Black Beacon of Ghosts (Black Beacon)

=== Best Fan Writer ===
- **Ian Mond**
- Bruce Gillespie
- LynC
- Jan MacNally

=== Best Fan Artist ===
- **David Russell**
- Annalise Jensen
- Lyss Wickramasinghe

=== Best Fan Publication in Any Medium ===
- **Let the Cat In**
- Ethel the Aardvark
- Going Prose
- Ornithopter
- SF Commentary
- Terry Talks Movies

=== Best New Talent ===
- **Sarah K. Balstrup**
- K.A. Burgess
- J.J. Carpenter
- Jeff Clulow

=== William Atheling Jr Award for Criticism or Review ===
- **Joanne Anderton for “Nice Safe Emotions: How Murderbot copes with the real world through the fictional, and so do we” (Speculative Insight 1/24)**
- Leigh Blackmore for “A Dark Magician Meets a Victorian Sleuth” (Dead Reckonings Fall ’24)
- Rjurik Davidson for “Critical Choices: Time Travel and Identity” (Speculative Insight 9/7/24)
- Ian Mond for reviews in Locus
- Gillian Polack for “A Thing Called the Glugs of Gosh: CJ Dennis and Satirical Fantasy” (Aurealis 6/24)
- Kyla Lee Ward for “Long Be-nightmar’d: on dreams in gothic and weird fiction” (JOURN-E: Volume 3.1)

== 2026: Swancon 50, Perth ==
The Ditmar awards will be presented at Swancon in Perth on the 31st of May 2026.

=== Best Novel ===
- The Crimson Road, AG Slatter (Titan Books)
- Veil, Jeff Clulow, (Third Eye Press)
- Honeyeater, Kathleen Jennings (Pan Macmillan)
- Upon a Starlit Tide, Kell Woods (Harper Collins)
- When Dark Waters Burn, Zena Shapter (Midnight Sun Publishing)

=== Best Novella/Novelette ===
- ‘The Hidden God’, Tim Napper (Asimov’s March/April)
- ‘Cinder House’, Freya Marske
- ‘The Cold House’, AG Slatter
- ‘A Second Coming’, Janeen Webb
- ‘Drowning in the Dark’, Matt Tighe

=== Best Short Story ===
- ‘A Shortcut via the New Tunnel, M-ate’, CH Pearce, (Never Say Die, CSFG)
- ‘Bitter Skin’, Kaaron Warren (Night and Day, Saga)
- ‘Phantom Loop’, S L Johnson [with Gio Clairval] (Tales from the Crosstimbers, Crosstimbers Publications LLC)
- ‘Scorpion Girl’, Janeen Webb (Scorpion Girl, PS Publishing)
- ‘The Girlfriend Experience’, CZ Tacks (Lightspeed Magazine)
- ‘Through These Moments, Darkly’, Samantha Murray, (Clarkesworld)

=== Collected Work ===
- Drowning in the Dark and Other Stories, Matt Tighe (IFWG)
- This Dark Architect and Other Grim Tales, Pamela Jeffs (Four Ink Press)
- Songs of Shadow, Words of Woe, Matthew R Davis (JournalStone)
- The Leper’s Garden and Other Contagions, Jeff Clulow (Third Eye Press)
- Scorpion Girl and Other Stories, Janeen Webb (PS Publishing)

=== Best New Talent ===
- KA Burgess
- Fionn MacPherson
- Scott Steensma
- Greg Foyster
- Meg Wright / Red Wallflower
- Emmi Khor
- Adam Richard
- Roanne Lau
- Jeff Clulow

=== Professional Artwork ===
- Honeyeater internal art, Kathleen Jennings
- Never Say Die cover, Maddison Lee
- The Ship’s Big Steaming Log: the Book of Bladderwrack, Adam Browne
- Rebels & Rainbows cover, C.H. Pearce

=== Fan Art ===
- Gideon the Ninth fan art, Annalise Jensen
- Brave New Wardrobe, Conflux 19 art show, Kaaron Warren
- Instagram art, Elise Miller

=== Fan Writer ===
- Leigh Edmonds, Ornithopter
- Jan MacNally reviews, Ethel the Aardvark fanzine (MSFC)
- Ian Mond reviews, Substack
- Rob Masters, writings on aus.social
- Claire Fitzpatrick, ‘Frankenstein in Pop-Culture’ (Aurealis)

=== Fan Publication ===
- Aurealis Awards: Behind the Curtain podcast, Alexandra Pierce
- Going Prose podcast, A.D. Ellicott and C.Z. Tacks
- Recent Reads book reviews blog, Leanbh Pearson
- The Narratives Library, Karena Wynn-Moylan
- Terry Talks Movies, Youtube, Terry Frost

=== William Atheling Jr Award for Criticism or Review ===
- Eugen Bacon, ‘Spec Fic and the Politics of Identity: Finding the Self in Other’, Strange Horizons
- Ian Mond for review in Locus
- Story Thinking and the Real-world Applications of Sci-Fi and Fantasy Writing by Helen Marshall, Kim Wilkins & Lisa Bennett
- ‘The Horror of Australian Literary Censorship’, Louise Zedda Sampson, in Midnight Echo #20
- ‘When ‘EAT THE RICH’ Is Not Enough: Horror Meets Late-Stage Capitalism’, Kirstyn McDermott, Ruadán Books
- ‘Almost a Witch’, Freyja Stokes, Speculative Insight
- Stephen Herczeg, ‘The Lost World: its influence on modern science fiction’, Steel True Blade Straight 2025/26, Belanger Books
- Stephen Herczeg, ‘August Derleth and the rise of the Cthulhu Mythos’, The Pontine Dossier Millenium Edition 2025, Belanger Books
- Russell Blackford, ‘Mass Appeal: Stephen Dedman’s Genre Alchemy’, Science Fiction: A Review of Speculative Literature, issue 57
- Russell Blackford, ‘Remembering Damien Broderick: A starlit mind in the cosmos of ideas’, SF Commentary 120
