= Australasian Shadows Awards =

Australian horror fiction literary award

- Awarded for: Excellence in horror fiction
- Location: Australia
- Country: Australia
- Presented by: Australasian Horror Writers Association
- First award: 2005
- Website: Australasian Horror

The Australasian Shadows Awards, formerly known as the Australian Shadows Awards, are annual literary awards established by the Australasian Horror Writers Association (AHWA) in 2005 to honour the best published works of horror fiction written or edited by an Australian/New Zealand/Oceania resident in the previous calendar year.

== Awards Criteria and History ==
Works are judged on their overall effect within the horror genre based on the author's skill, delivery, and the work's lasting resonance. Each year, a director is appointed by the AHWA to administer the award. Shortlists for each category are determined by a panel of judges, and the shortlisted nominees are announced in March/April every year.

From 2005 to 2008, the Australian Shadows Award evaluated novels, anthologies, and short stories against each other in a single category. In 2009, the award was expanded into three categories: Short Fiction, Long Fiction, and Edited Publication.

From 2011, the award was restructured to consist of five categories: Novel; Long Fiction (novellas and novelettes); Short Fiction (short stories); Collection (single author collections); and Edited Publication (anthologies and magazine issues). In 2013, the 'Long Fiction' award category was renamed the 'Paul Haines Award for Long Fiction' in honour of New Zealand/Australian author Paul Haines. In 2015, two additional categories were added: Best Comic/Graphic Novel and The Rocky Wood Award for Non-Fiction and Criticism.

The Australian Shadows Awards were sponsored by Altair Australia Books in its first two years, through the donation of two statuettes created by dark fantasy artist Brom (supplied by The Franklin Mint). Currently, winners of the awards receive a gravestone-shaped trophy hand-crafted by Sydney-based artist, Adam Galea.

== Winners and Nominees ==
In the below list, the years correspond to the year of the book's eligibility; the awards are always announced the following year. If the short story was originally published in an anthology with other stories rather than by itself or in a magazine, the anthology title and anthology publisher's name is included.

== 2005 ==
=== Judges ===
- Guest judge: Kim Wilkins
- Award Director: Marty Young

=== Winner ===
- Father Muerte and the Flesh, Lee Battersby, Aurealis #36

=== Nominees ===
- Pater Familias, Lee Battersby, Shadowed Realms #3
- Shadow Box, Shane Jiraiya Cummings & Angela Challis (eds) (Brimstone Press)
- The Red Priest's Homecoming, Dirk Flinthart, Andromeda Spaceways Inflight Magazine #17
- The Grinding House, Kaaron Warren (CSFG Publishing)

== 2006 ==
=== Judges ===
- Judging panel: David Schembri, Miranda Siemienowicz, Mark Smith-Briggs
- Guest judge: Robert Hood
- Award Director: Marty Young

=== Winner ===
- The Pilo Family Circus, Will Elliott (ABC Books)

=== Nominees ===
- Father Renoir's Hands, Lee Battersby, Through Soft Air (Prime Books)
- The Dying Light, Deborah Biancotti, Eidolon I (Eidolon Books)
- The Blow-Off, Stephen Dedman, Brutarian #47
- The Bridal Bier, Carol Ryles, Eidolon I (Eidolon Books)

==== Honourable Mentions ====
- Silk and Pearls, K. J. Bishop, Shadowed Realms #9
- The Cup of Nestor, Simon Brown (Ticonderoga Publications)
- Basic Black: Tales of Appropriate Fear, Terry Dowling (Cemetery Dance Publications)
- The Mother, Brett McBean (Lothian Books)

== 2007 ==
=== Judges ===
- Judging panel: Shane Jiraiya Cummings, Gary Kemble, Mark Smith-Briggs
- Guest judge: Richard Harland
- Award Director: Kirstyn McDermott

=== Winner ===
- Toother, Terry Dowling, Eclipse 1 (Night Shade Books)

=== Nominees ===
- Between the Memories, Matthew Chrulew, Aurealis #38/39
- Subtle Invasion, David Conyers, The Black Book of Horror (Mortbury Press)
- The Dark and What It Said, Rick Kennett, Andromeda Spaceways Inflight Magazine #28
- There Was Darkness, Martin Livings, Fantastic Wonder Stories (Ticonderoga Publications)
- The Darkness Within, Jason Nahrung (Hachette Livre)

==== Honourable Mentions ====
- The Spiraling Worm, David Conyers & John Sunseri (Chaosium)
- Cooling the Crows, Kaaron Warren, In Bad Dreams (Eneit Press)
- The Wildflowers, Marty Young, Fantastic Wonder Stories (Ticonderoga Publications)

== 2008 ==
=== Judges ===
- Judging panel: Shane Jiraiya Cummings, Brett McBean, Chuck McKenzie
- Guest judge: Sarah Endacott
- Award Director: Kirstyn McDermott

=== Winner ===
- The Claws of Native Ghosts, Lee Battersby, The Beast Within (Graveside Books)

=== Nominees ===
- This Way To The Exit, Sara Douglass, Dreaming Again (HarperVoyager)
- Rick Gets A Job, Jason Fischer, Andromeda Spaceways Inflight Magazine #37
- Lakeside, Christopher Green, Dreaming Again (HarperVoyager)
- Her Collection of Intimacy, Paul Haines, Black: Australian Dark Culture #2

== 2009 ==
=== Judges ===
- Judging panel: Craig Bezant, Stephanie Gunn, Chuck McKenzie
- Guest judges: Bill Congreve (Short Fiction), James Doig (Edited Publication), Martin Livings (Long Fiction)
- Award Director: Shane Jiraiya Cummings

=== Long Fiction ===
==== Winner ====
- Slights, Kaaron Warren (Angry Robot)

==== Nominees ====
- A Book of Endings, Deborah Biancotti (Twelfth Planet Press)
- Red Queen, Honey Brown (Penguin Australia)
- Wives, Paul Haines, X6 (Coeur de Lion Publishing)
- The Dead Path, Stephen M. Irwin (Hachette Australia)

=== Edited Publication ===
==== Winner ====
- Grants Pass, Jennifer Brozek & Amanda Pillar (Morrigan Books)

==== Nominees ====
- Festive Fear, Stephen Clark (Tasmaniac Publications)
- Aurealis #42, Stuart Mayne (Chimaera Publications)

=== Short Fiction ===
==== Winner ====
- Six Suicides, Deborah Biancotti, A Book of Endings (Twelfth Planet Press)

==== Nominees ====
- The Emancipated Dance, Felicity Dowker, Midnight Echo #2
- Busking, Jason Fischer, Midnight Echo #3
- The Message, Andrew J. McKiernan, Midnight Echo #2
- The Gaze Dogs of Nine Waterfalls, Kaaron Warren, Exotic Gothic 3, Ash-Tree Press

== 2010 ==
=== Judges ===
- Judging panel: Craig Bezant, Stephanie Gunn, Jeff Ritchie
- Guest judges: Kaaron Warren (Short Fiction), Rocky Wood (Edited Publication), Chuck McKenzie (Long Fiction)
- Award Director: Shane Jiraiya Cummings

=== Long Fiction ===
==== Winner ====
- Under Stones, Bob Franklin (Affirm Press)

==== Nominees ====
- Bleed, Peter M. Ball (Twelfth Planet Press)
- Guardian of the Dead, Karen Healy (Allen & Unwin)
- Madigan Mine, Kirstyn McDermott (Picador Australia)
- The Girl With No Hands, Angela Slatter (Ticonderoga Publications)

=== Edited Publication ===
==== Winner ====
- Macabre: A Journey through Australia's Darkest Fears, Angela Challis & Marty Young (eds) (Brimstone Press)

==== Nominees ====
- Midnight Echo #4, Lee Battersby (ed) (Australian Horror Writers Association)
- Scary Kisses, Liz Grzyb (ed) (Ticonderoga Publications)
- Scenes From the Second Storey, Amanda Pillar & Pete Kempshall (eds) (Morrigan Books)

=== Short Fiction ===
==== Winner ====
- She Said, Kirstyn McDermott, Scenes from the Second Storey (Morrigan Books)

==== Nominees ====
- Bread and Circuses, Felicity Dowker, Scary Kisses (Ticonderoga Publications)
- Brisneyland by Night, Angela Slatter, Sprawl (Twelfth Planet Press)
- All The Clowns In Clowntown, Andrew J. McKiernan, Macabre: A Journey through Australia's Darkest Fears (Brimstone Press)
- Dream Machine, David Conyers, Scenes from the Second Storey (Morrigan Books)

== 2011 ==
=== Judges ===
- Judging panel: Marty Young, James A. Moore

=== Novel ===
==== Winner ====
No award

==== Honourable Mention ====
- The Broken Ones, Stephen M. Irwin (Random House)

=== Long Fiction ===
==== Winner ====
- The Past is a Bridge Best Left Burnt, Paul Haines, The Last Days of Kali Yuga (Brimstone Press)

==== Nominees ====
- And the Dead Shall Outnumber the Living, Deborah Biancotti, Ishtar (Gilgamesh Press)
- Sleeping and the Dead, Cat Sparks, Ishtar (Gilgamesh Press)
- From the Teeth of Strange Children, Lisa L. Hannett, Bluegrass Symphony (Ticonderoga Publications)

=== Short Fiction ===
==== Winner ====
- Shovel Man Joe, Amanda J. Spedding, Shades of Sentience

==== Nominees ====
- Out Hunting for Teeth, Joanne Anderton, Midnight Echo #6
- The Sea at Night, Joanne Anderton, Dead Red Heart (Ticonderoga Publications)
- Taking It for the Team, Tracie McBride, Dead Red Heart (Ticonderoga Publications)
- The Wanderer in Darkness, Andrew J. McKiernan, Midnight Echo #6

=== Edited Publication ===
==== Winner ====
- Dead Red Heart, Russell B. Farr (ed) (Ticonderoga Publications)

==== Nominees ====
- More Scary Kisses, Liz Grzyb (ed) (Ticonderoga Publications)
- Midnight Echo #6, David Kernot, David Conyers and Jason Fischer (eds) (Australian Horror Writers Association)
- The Year's Best Fantasy and Horror, Liz Grzyb and Talie Helene (eds) (Ticonderoga Publications)

=== Collection ===
==== Winner ====
- Tales of Sin and Madness, Brett McBean (Thunderstorm Books/Legume Man Books)

==== Nominees ====
- Bluegrass Symphony, Lisa L. Hannett (Ticonderoga Publications)
- The Last Days of Kali Yuga, Paul Haines (Brimstone Press)
- Matilda Told Such Dreadful Lies, Lucy Sussex (Ticonderoga Publications)
- Apocrypha Sequence, Shane Jiraiya Cummings (self-published)

== 2012 ==
=== Judges ===
- Short Stories/Collections/Edited Works panel: Steve Gerlach, Greg Chapman, Stephen Clark
- Novels/Novellas panel: Gerry Huntman, Jenny Blackford, B. Michael Radburn

=== Novel ===
==== Winner ====
- Perfections, Kirstyn McDermott (Xoum Publishing)

==== Nominees ====
- The Corpse Rat King, Lee Battersby (Angry Robot Books)
- Blood and Dust, Jason Nahrung (Xoum Publishing)

=== Long Fiction ===
==== Winner ====
- Sky, Kaaron Warren, Through Splintered Walls (Twelfth Planet Press)

==== Nominees ====
- Critique, Daniel I. Russell (Dark Continents Publishing)
- Escena de un Asesinato, Robert Hood, Exotic Gothic 4 (PS Publishing)

=== Short Fiction ===
==== Winner ====
- Birthday Suit, Martin Livings, Living with the Dead (Dark Prints Press)

==== Nominees ====
- To Wish On A Clockwork Heart, Felicity Dowker, Bread and Circuses (Ticonderoga Publications)
- Pigroot Flat, Jason Fischer, Midnight Echo #8
- They Don't Know That We Know What They Know, Andrew J. McKiernan, Midnight Echo #8
- Creek, Kaaron Warren, Through Splintered Walls (Twelfth Planet Press)
- Mountain, Kaaron Warren, Through Splintered Walls (Twelfth Planet Press)
- Road, Kaaron Warren, Through Splintered Walls (Twelfth Planet Press)
- A Monstrous Touch, Marty Young, Dangers Untold (Alliteration Ink)

=== Edited Publication ===
==== Winner ====
- Surviving The End, Craig Bezant (Dark Prints Press)

==== Nominees ====
- Cthulhu Unbound 3, David Conyers and Brian M. Sammons (eds) (Permuted Press)
- The Year's Best Australian Fantasy & Horror, Liz Grzyb and Talie Helene (eds) (Ticonderoga Publications)

=== Collection ===
==== Winner ====
- Through Splintered Walls, Kaaron Warren (Twelfth Planet Press)

==== Nominees ====
- Bread and Circuses, Felicity Dowker (Ticonderoga Publications)
- Living With The Dead, Martin Livings (Dark Prints Press)

== 2013 ==
=== Judges ===
- Short Stories/Collections/Edited Works panel: Steve Gerlach, Gitte Christensen, Lee Pletzers
- Novels/Novellas panel: Gerry Huntman, Geoff Brown, Chuck McKenzie

=== Novel ===
==== Winner ====
- 809 Jacob Street, Marty Young (Black Beacon Books)

==== Nominees ====
- Undead Kelly, Timothy Bowden (Severed Press)
- Topsiders, Scott Tyson (Legume Man Books)

=== Paul Haines Award for Long Fiction ===
==== Winner ====
- The Unwanted Women of Surrey, Kaaron Warren, Queen Victoria's Book of Spells (Tor Books)

==== Nominees ====
- Soul Killer, Robert Hood, Zombies vs Robots: Diplomacy (IDW Publishing)
- The Home For Broken Dolls, Kirstyn McDermott, Caution: Contains Small Parts (Twelfth Planet Press)

=== Short Fiction ===
==== Winner ====
- Caterpillars, Debbie Cowens, Baby Teeth - Bite Sized Tales of Terror (Paper Road Press)

==== Nominees ====
- Nip, Tuck, Zip, Pluck, John Paul Fitch, Psychopomp Volume 4 (Artifice Comics)
- Fence Lines, Joanne Anderton, The Bone Chime Song and other stories (FableCroft Publishing)
- The Nest, C. S. McMullen, Nightmare Magazine #12
- The Dead Way, J. C. Hart, Baby Teeth - Bite Sized Tales of Terror (Paper Road Press)

=== Edited Publication ===
==== Winner ====
- Baby Teeth - Bite Sized Tales of Terror, Dan Rabarts and Lee Murray (eds) (Paper Road Press)

==== Nominees ====
- Midnight Echo #9, Geoff Brown (ed) (Australian Horror Writers Association)
- A Killer Among Demons, Craig Bezant (ed) (Dark Prints Press)
- Star Quake 1, Sophie Yorkston (ed) (IFWG Publishing)

=== Collection ===
==== Winner ====
- The Bone Chime Song and other stories, Jo Anderton (FableCroft Publishing)

==== Nominees ====
- There was no nominee shortlist in 2013

== 2014 ==
=== Judges ===
- Short Stories/Collections/Edited Works panel: Christine Ferdinands, Natalie Satakovski, B. R. de Loryn
- Novels/Novellas panel: Jay Caselberg (novellas only), Kathy Williams-DeVries, Lee Pletzers, B. R. de Loryn

=== Novel ===
==== Winner ====
- Wolf Creek: Origin, Aaron Sterns and Greg McLean (Penguin)

==== Nominees ====
- Suicide Forest, Jeremy Bates (Ghillinnein Books)
- Book of the Dead, Greig Beck (Momentum Books)
- Dark Deceit, Lauren Dawes (Momentum Books)
- Davey Ribbon, Matthew Tait (HodgePodge Press)

=== Paul Haines Award for Long Fiction ===
==== Winner ====
- Dreams of Destruction, Shane Jiraiya Cummings (self-published)

==== Nominees ====
- Ghost Camera, Darcy Coates (self-published)
- The Shark God Covenant, Robert Hood, Dimension6 #3

=== Short Fiction ===
==== Winner ====
- Shadows of the Lonely Dead, Alan Baxter, Suspended in Dusk (Books of the Dead Press)

==== Nominees ====
- Mephisto, Alan Baxter, Daily Science Fiction
- Mummified Monk, Rebecca Fung, Daylight Dims Volume 2
- Bones, Michelle Jager, SQ Mag #14
- Last Year When We Were Young, Andrew J. McKiernan, Last Year When We Were Young (Satalyte Publishing)

=== Edited Publication ===
==== Winner ====
- SQ Mag #14, Sophie Yorkston (ed) (IFWG Publishing)

==== Nominees ====
- SNAFU, Geoff Brown and Amanda J. Spedding (eds) (Cohesion Press)
- Suspended in Dusk, Simon Dewar (ed) (Books of the Dead Press)

=== Collection ===
==== Winner ====
- Last Year When We Were Young, Andrew J. McKiernan (Satalyte Publishing)

==== Nominees ====
- There was no nominee shortlist in 2014

== 2015 ==
=== The Paul Haines Award for Long Fiction ===
==== Winner ====
- In Vaulted Halls Entombed, Alan Baxter

==== Nominees ====
- The Haunting of Gillespie House, Darcy Coates
- Night Shift, Dirk Flinthart
- The Whimper, Robert Hood

=== Edited Work ===
==== Winner ====
- Blurring the Line, Marty Young

==== Nominees ====
- Bloodlines, Amanda Pillar
- Lighthouses, Cameron Trost
- Midnight Echo 11, Kaaron Warren

=== Collected Work ===
==== Winner ====
- Peripheral Visions: The Collected Ghost Stories, Rob Hood

==== Nominees ====
- The Abandonment of Grace and Everything After, Shane Jiraiya Cummings
- Cherry Crow Children, Deborah Kalin

=== Short Fiction ===
==== Winner ====
- Mine Intercom, Kaaron Warren

==== Nominees ====
- The Bone Maiden, Greg Chapman
- Eight Seconds, Pandora Hope
- El Caballo Muerte, Martin Livings
- Perfect Little Stitches, Deborah Sheldon

=== Comic/Graphic Novel ===
==== Winner ====
- The Road to Golgotha, G. N. Braun & Amanda J. Spedding

==== Nominees ====
- Troll, Michael Michalandos
- The Monster, Ben Rosenthal
- Undad, Shane W. Smith

=== The Rocky Wood Award for Non-fiction and Criticism ===
==== Winner ====
- The Literary Gothic, Marija Elektra Rodriguez

=== Novel ===
==== Winner ====
- The Catacombs, Jeremy Bates

==== Nominees ====
- The Haunting of Blackwood House, Darcy Coates
- The Transgressions Cycle: The Mother, Mike Jones
- The Transgressions Cycle: The Reparation, Mike Jones
- The Big Smoke, Jason Nahrung

== 2016 ==
Award Director: Claire Fitzpatrick

=== Short Fiction ===
==== Winner ====
- His Shining Day, Richard Harland (Dreaming in the Dark)

==== Nominees ====
- D Is for Death, Pete Aldin (C is for Chimera)
- Midnight in the Graffiti Tunnel, Terry Dowling (Dreaming in the Dark)
- Protege, Anthony Ferguson (Monsters Among Us)
- No Other Men in Mitchell, Rose Hartley (Nightmare 2/16)
- Selfie, Lee Murray (SQ Mag 5/16)
- What the Sea Wants, Deb Sheldon (SQ Mag 2/16)
- Uncontainable, Helen Stubbs (Apex Magazine 12/16)
- All Roll Over, Kaaron Warren (In Your Face)
- Fade to Grey, Janeen Webb (Dreaming in the Dark)

=== Comic/Graphic Novel ===
No award

=== Collected Work ===
==== Winner ====
- Crow Shine, Alan Baxter (Ticonderoga)

==== Nominees ====
- Concentration, Jack Dann (PS)
- Everything Is Fine, Grant Stone (Racket House)

=== Edited Work ===
==== Winner ====
- Dead of Night, Shane Jiraiya Cummings, ed. (Australian Horror Writers Association)

==== Nominees ====
- Dreaming in the Dark, Jack Dann, ed. (PS Australia)
- At the Edg'e, Dan Rabarts & Lee Murray, eds. (Paper Road)

=== Novel ===
==== Winner ====
- The Grief Hole, Kaaron Warren (IFWG)

==== Nominees ====
- Hollow House, Greg Chapman (Omnium Gatherum)
- The Devil's Prayer, Luke Gracias (self-published)
- Presumed Dead, Rick Kennett (self-published)
- The Invasion, Brett McBean (Sinister Grin)
- Into the Mist, Lee Murray (Cohesion)
- Unbidden, TJ Park (HarperImpulse)
- Devil Dragon, Deborah Sheldon (Severed)

=== Paul Haines Award for Long Fiction ===
==== Winner ====
- Tipuna Tapu, Dan Rabarts (And Then...: The Great Big Book of Awesome Adventure Tales, Vol I)

==== Nominees ====
- Box Of Bones, Jeremy Bates (Ghillinnein)
- Served Cold, Alan Baxter (Dreaming in the Dark)
- The Eschatologist, Greg Chapman (Voodoo)
- The Heart of the Mission, Matthew R. Davis (Oz Horror Con)
- Burnt Sugar, Kirstyn McDermott (Dreaming in the Dark)

== 2017 ==
Award Director: J. Ashley Smith

=== The Rocky Wood Award for Non-Fiction and Criticism ===
==== Winner ====
- The Body Horror Book, Claire Fitzpatrick (Oscillate Wildly Press)

==== Nominees ====
- 101 Weird Writers #46 – Ryūnosuke Akutagawa, Kat Clay (Weird Fiction Review)
- Literary Serial Killer Fiction: The Evolution of a Genre, William Cook (Victoria University, Wellington NZ)
- It Follows is the Millennial STD Parable of Our Time, Maria Lewis (SBS)
- A Shared Ambition: Horror Writers in Horror Fiction, Kyla Lee Ward (AHWA, Midnight Echo #12)

=== Written Work in a Comic/Graphic Novel ===
No award

=== Edited Work ===
==== Winner ====
- Cthulhu Deep Down Under Volume 1, Steve Proposch, Christopher Sequeira & Bryce J. Stevens (IFWG Publishing)

==== Nominees ====
- Midnight Echo #12, Shane Jiraiya Cummings & Anthony P. Ferguson (AHWA)
- Below the Stairs – Tales from the Cellar, Steven Dillon (Things in the Well)

=== Collected Work ===
==== Winner ====
- Perfect Little Stitches and Other Stories, Deborah Sheldon (IFWG Publishing)

==== Nominees ====
- Singing My Sister Down and Other Stories, Margo Lanagan (Allen & Unwin)

=== Short Fiction ===
==== Winner ====
- The Banksia Boys, Matthew J. Morrison (Andromeda Spaceways Inflight Magazine #66)

==== Nominees ====
- Outside a Drifter, Lisa L. Hannett (Looming Low Vol.1, Dim Shores Press)
- The Hand Walker, Rue Karney (Pacific Monsters, Fox Spirit Press)
- The Circle Line, Martin Livings (Between the Tracks, Things in the Well)
- The Little Mermaid, in Passing, Angela Slatter (The Review of Australian Fiction, April 2017)
- The Big Reveal, David Stevens (Kaleidotrope)

=== The Paul Haines Award for Long Fiction ===
==== Winner ====
- Ismail's Expulsion, Brian Craddock (Between the Tracks, Things in the Well)

==== Nominees ====
- Hope and Walker, Andrew Cull (Vermillion2One)
- This Impossible Gift, Matthew R. Davis (Midnight Echo #12, AHWA)
- No Good Deed, Angela Slatter (New Fears, Titan Books)
- Furtherest, Kaaron Warren (Dark Screams Vol. 7, Cemetery Dance)
- Eden in the End, Ashlee Scheuerman (Perpetual Motion Machine Publishing)

=== Novel ===
==== Winner ====
- Corpselight (Verity Fassbinder Book 2), Angela Slatter (Jo Fletcher Books)

==== Nominees ====
- Aletheia, J. S. Breukelaar (Crystal Lake Publishing)
- Slithers, W. W. Mortensen (Self Published)
- Soon, Lois Murphy (Transit Lounge)
- Providence Place, Matthew Tait (Dark Crib Publications)

== 2018 ==
Award Director: Silvia Brown

=== Poetry ===
==== Winner ====
- Revenants of the Antipodes, Kyla Lee Ward (HWA Poetry Showcase, Volume V)

==== Nominees ====
- Polarity, Jay Caselberg (The Literary Hatchet 8-9/18)
- The Middle of the Night, Rebecca Fraser (Breach #09)
- Your Mortician Knows, Bee Nielsen (A Little Ray of Obsidian Black)
- Matinee, Hester J. Rook (Chrome Baby 4/12/18)

=== Written Work in a Comic/Graphic Novel ===
==== Winner ====
- The Demon: Hell is Earth, Andrew Constant (DC)

==== Nominees ====
The judges for Graphic Novel unanimously agreed on a winner but not a shortlist

=== Edited Work ===
==== Winner ====
- Hellhole: An Anthology of Subterranean Horror, Lee Murray, ed. (Adrenaline)

==== Nominees ====
- Behind the Mask, Steve Dillon, ed. (Oz Horror Con)
- Cthulhu: Land of the Long White Cloud and Cthulhu Deep Down Under, Volume 2, Steve Proposch, Christopher Sequeira & Bryce J. Stevens, eds. (IFWG)

=== Collected Work ===
==== Winner ====
- Shadows on the Wall, Steven Paulsen (IFWG Publishing)

==== Nominees ====
- Singing My Sister Down and Other Stories, Margo Lanagan (Allen & Unwin)
- Bones, Andrew Cull (Vermillion2One)
- The Dalziel Files, Brian Craddock (Broken Puppet Books)
- Exploring Dark Fiction #2: A Primer to Kaaron Warren, Eric J. Guignard, ed. (Dark Moon)
- Beneath the Ferny Tree, David Schembri (Close-Up)

=== Short Fiction ===
==== Winner ====
- Riptide, Dan Rabarts (Suspended in Dusk II)

==== Nominees ====
- The House of Jack's Girls, Lee Battersby (PseudoPod 10/12/18)
- The Ward of Tindalos, Debbie Cowens & Matt Cowens (Cthulhu: Land of the Long White Cloud)
- Planned and Expected, Piper Mejia (Breach #09)
- Slither, Jason Nahrung (Cthulhu Deep Down Under, Volume 2)

=== The Paul Haines Award for Long Fiction ===
==== Winner ====
- The Black Sea, Chris Mason (Beneath the Waves: Tales from the Deep)

==== Nominees ====
- Time and Tide, Robert Hood (Cthulhu Deep Down Under, Volume 2)
- Thylacines, Deborah Sheldon (Severed)
- Love Thee Better, Kaaron Warren (Creatures: The Legacy of Frankenstein)

=== Novel ===
==== Winner ====
- Tide of Stone, Kaaron Warren (Omnium Gatherum)

==== Nominees ====
- Devouring Dark, Alan Baxter (Grey Matter)
- Teeth of the Wolf, Dan Rabarts & Lee Murray (Raw Dog Screaming)
- Contrition, Deborah Sheldon (IFWG)

== 2019 ==
The winners were announced in June 2019:

=== Poetry ===
==== Winner ====
- "Taxonomy of Captured Roses", Hester J. Rook (Kaleidotrope, Autumn '19)

==== Nominees ====
- Separation, Jay Caselberg (The Literary Hatchet #23)
- Please Do Not Feed the Animals, Anne Casey (out of emptied cups)
- Ode to a Black Hole, Charles Lovecraft (Spectral Realms Winter '19)
- Brine and Vanishings, Hester J. Rook (Luminality #21)
- Boat of a Million Years, Kyla Lee Ward (The Macabre Modern and Other Morbidities)

=== Written Work in a Comic/Graphic Novel ===
==== Winner ====
- DCeased, Tom Taylor, (art by Trevor Hairsine, Stefano Gaudiano, Laura Braga, Richard Friend, James Harren, Darick Robertson, Trevor Scott and Neil Edwards) (DC)

==== Nominees ====
- The Eldritch Kid: The Bone War, Christian D. Read (art by Paul Mason)
- Matinee, Emmet O'Cuana (art by David Parsons)
- Geebung Polo Club, Jason Fischer (adapted from a Banjo Patterson poem), (art by Shauna O'Meara)

=== Edited Work ===
==== Winner ====
- Midnight Echo Volume 14, Deborah Sheldon, ed. (Australasian Horror Writers Association)

==== Nominees ====
- Beside the Seaside: Tales from the Day-Tripper, Steve Dillon, ed. (self-published)
- Trickster's Treats, Volume 3: The Seven Deadly Sins Edition, Marie O'Regan & Lee Murray, eds. (self-published)

=== Collected Work ===
==== Winner ====
- Served Cold, Alan Baxter (Grey Matter)

==== Nominees ====
- Collision: Stories, J. S. Breukelaar (Meerkat)
- Figments and Fragments, Deborah Sheldon (IFWG)

=== Short Fiction ===
==== Winner ====
- Steadfast Shadowsong, Matthew R. Davis (Dig Two Graves)

==== Nominees ====
- The Ocean Hushed the Stones, Alan Baxter (Served Cold)
- Ave Rune, J. S. Breukelaar (Collision: Stories)
- Vivienne & Agnes, Chris Mason (Beside the Seaside: Tales from the Daytripper)

=== The Paul Haines Award for Long Fiction ===
==== Winner ====
- Supermassive Black Mass, Matthew R. Davis

==== Nominees ====
- 1862, C. J. Halbard (Man on Fire)
- Enemy of My Enemy, Rick Kennett (War of the Worlds: Battleground Australia)
- Out of Darkness, Chris Mason (Tales of the Lost, Volume 1)
- The Neverwhere Line, Matthew J. Morrison (Midnight Echo #14)

=== Novel ===
==== Winner ====
- Shepherd, Catherine Jinks (Text)

==== Nominees ====
- The Flower and the Serpent, Madeleine D'Este (self-published)
- Fusion, Kate Richards (Raw Dog Screaming)
- Contrition, Deborah Sheldon (IFWG)

=== Rocky Wood Award for Non-Fiction and Criticism ===
==== Winner ====
- The Danse Macabre, Kyla Lee Ward (The Macabre Modern and Other Morbidities)

==== Nominees ====
- Suffer the Little Children, Kris Ashton (Aurealis #119)
- Horror and the paranormal, Eugen Bacon (Writing Speculative Fiction)
- Horror Movies That Mean Something and Childhood Trauma Manifested, Maria Lewis (flicks.com.au)

== 2020 ==
=== Judges ===
- Short Fiction: Paul Sheldon, Paul Mannering, Chris Jacobs
- Non-Fiction: Rebecca Fraser, Tracie McBride, Al Hodge
- Graphic Novel: Eugen Bacon, Bernie Rutkay, Jason Franks
- Poetry: Kathryn Hore, Lee Murray, Kyla Lee Ward
- Novel: Joanne Anderton, Paul Sheldon, Cem Bilici
- Long Fiction: Al Hodge, Joanne Anderton, Paul Mannering
- Collected Works: Louise Zedda-Sampson, Lynette Watters, Alannah Pearson
- Edited Works: Dominique Davidson, Lynette Watters, Bernie Rutkay

=== Poetry ===
==== Winner ====
- This Soundless Murk, Hester J. Rook (The Future File)

==== Nominees ====
- Separation, K.S. Nikakis (Journey: Seeking the Sacred, Spirit and Soul in the Australian Wilderness)
- The King of Eyes, P. S. Cottier (Monstrous)
- Ode to a Black Hole, P. S. Cottier (Monstrous)
- The Tongueless Dead, Leigh Blackmore (Spectral Realms #13)

=== Rocky Wood Award for Non-Fiction and Criticism ===
==== Winner ====
- Exploration of Menstruation in Horror and Dark Fiction, Tabatha Wood

==== Nominees ====
- Queer Vampires in Modern Cinema, Tabatha Wood
- Cthulu in California, Emmet O’Cuana
- What Makes Good Horror, Tim Hawken
- Phantasmagoria and the Earliest Forms of Horror Storytelling, Maria Lewis
- Sandalwood and Jade: The Weird and Fantastic Verse of Lin Carter, Leigh Blackmore

=== Graphic Novel ===
==== Winner ====
- Hellblazer: Rise and Fall, Tom Taylor, (art by Darick Robertson) (DC Comics)

==== Nominees ====
- DCeased: Unkillables, Tom Taylor and Karl Mostert (DC Comics)
- The Mycelium Complex, Daniel Reed
- Redback Armageddon, Nathan Grixti (Self-published)
- Undad Volume Three, Katie Walsh-Smith, Miranda Richardson, Tim Stiles, Ryan Lindsay, Shane W Smith, Mitchell Collins and Simon Robins (Self-published)

=== Edited Work ===
==== Winner ====
- Midnight Echo Volume 15, Lee Murray, ed. (Australasian Horror Writers Association)

==== Nominees ====
- Black Cranes: Tales of Unquiet Women, Lee Murray and Geneve Flynn, eds. (Omnium Gatherum)
- Hadithi & the State of Black Speculative Fiction, Eugen Bacon and Milton Davis, eds. (Luna Press Publishing)
- Black Dogs, Black Tales – Where the Dogs Don't Die, Tabatha Wood and Cassie Hart, eds. (Things in the Well)
- Trickster's Treats 4 – Coming, Buried or Not!, Louise Zedda-Sampson and Geneve Flynn, eds. (Things in the Well)

=== Collected Work ===
==== Winner ====
- The Heart is a Mirror for Sinners, Angela Slatter (PS Publishing)

==== Nominees ====
- Behind the Midnight Blinds, Marty Young (Things in the Well)
- Red New Day, Angela Slatter (Brain Jar Press)
- Bleak Precision, Greg Chapman (self-published)
- Grotesque, Lee Murray (Things in the Well)

=== Short Fiction ===
==== Winner ====
- Brumation, Anthony Ferguson (Midnight Echo Volume 15)

==== Nominees ====
- Vision Thing, Matthew R. Davis (Black Dogs, Black Tales)
- Let Shadows Slip Through, Kali Napier (New Gothic Review 2)
- The Bone Fairy, Martin Livings (Midnight Echo Volume 15)
- Hideous Armature, Joanne Anderton (Midnight Echo Volume 15)
- Needles, Kali Napier (The Dark #62)

=== The Paul Haines Award for Long Fiction ===
==== Winner ====
- By Touch and By Glance, Lisa L Hannett (Songs for Dark Seasons)

==== Nominees ====
- New Wine, Angela Slatter (Cursed)
- The Attic Tragedy, Joseph Ashley-Smith
- Barralang, pop. 63, Deborah Sheldon (Dimension6 #19)
- Kua Hinga Te Kauri, Dan Rabarts (Outback Horrors Down Under)

=== Novel ===
==== Winner ====
- Deception Pass, Matthew Tait (Dark Crib)

==== Nominees ====
- The Crying Forest, Venero Armanno (IFWG Publishing)
- Gutterbreed, Marty Young (Eclectic Trio)
- Flyaway, Kathleen Jennings (Picador)

== 2021 ==
=== Rocky Wood Award for Non-Fiction and Criticism ===
==== Winner ====
- I'm Looking Right At You, HP Lovecraft, Jack Dann (IFWG)

==== Nominees ====
- Vampire Poetry, Kyla Lee Ward (Hippocampus Press)
- The Curious Reclassification of Peter Benchley's Jaws, Kris Ashton (Aurealis Magazine)
- Capturing Ghosts on the Page, Kaaron Warren (Brain Jar Press)
- Murder Down Under, Anthony Ferguson (Exposit Books)

=== Poetry ===
==== Winner ====
- Cheongsam, Lee Murray (Tortured Willows: Bent. Bowed. Unbroken)

==== Nominees ====
- When The Girls Began To Fall, Geneve Flynn (Tortured Willows: Bent. Bowed. Unbroken.)
- Sonnet for a Scarecrow, Rebecca Fraser (Curioser Magazine, issue 1)
- Guest of Honour, Geneve Flynn (Tortured Willows: Bent. Bowed. Unbroken.)
- Snip, P.S. Cottier (Midnight Echo #16)
- Exquisite, Lee Murray (Tortured Willows: Bent. Bowed. Unbroken.)

=== Graphic Novel ===
==== Winner ====
- The Mycelium Complex Issue 2, Daniel Reed (Nautilus Illustrations)

==== Nominees ====
- Frankie's Drive-In Ozploitation Double Feature, Aaron Harvie (Badharvie)
- Goetia, Robert Buratti (Sub Rosa Publishing)

=== Edited Work ===
==== Winner ====
- Spawn: Weird Horror Tales About Pregnancy, Birth and Babies, Deborah Sheldon, ed. (IFWG Publishing)

==== Nominees ====
- SNAFU: Holy War, Amanda J. Spedding and Geoff Brown, eds. (Cohesion Press)
- Midnight Echo #16, Tim Hawken, ed. (AHWA)

=== Collected Work ===
==== Winner ====
- Tool tales, Kaaron Warren (IFWG Publishing)

==== Nominees ====
- The Tallow-Wife and Other Tales, Angela Slatter (Tartarus Press)
- Seeds, Tabatha Wood (Wild Wood Books)
- Inanimates, Joanne Anderton (Brain Jar Press)
- Danged Black Thing, Eugen Bacon (Transit Lounge Publishing)

=== Short Fiction ===
==== Winner ====
- A Good Big Brother, Matt Tighe (Spawn: Weird Horror Tales About Pregnancy, Birth and Babies)

==== Nominees ====
- Bad Apple by Louise Pieper (Good Southern Witches)
- Tagged by Chuck McKenzie (Andromeda Spaceways Inflight Magazine)
- The Best Medicine by Pauline Yates (Midnight Echo #16)
- The Steering Wheel Club by Kaaron Warren (Giving the Devil His Due)

=== The Paul Haines Award for Long Fiction ===
==== Winner ====
- Ariadne, I Love You, J. Ashley-Smith (Meerkat Press)

==== Nominees ====
- The Waiting Room, Matthew Davis (It Calls from the Doors)
- Cryptid Killers, Alister Hodge
- The Little One, Rebecca Fraser (Coralesque and Other Tales to Disturb and Distract)
- Dirty Heads, Aaron Dries

=== Novel ===
==== Winner ====
- The Girls Left Behind, J.P. Townley

==== Nominees ====
- Butcherbird, Cassie Hart
- An Ill Wind, Martin Livings
- Papa Lucy and the Boneman, Jason Fischer
- The Airways, Jennifer Mills
- Merfolk, Jeremy Bates

== 2022 ==
=== Rocky Wood Award for Non-Fiction and Criticism ===
==== Winner ====
- The Slow Burn Brilliance of Midnight Mass, Kris Ashton (Aurealis Magazine)

==== Nominees ====
- I Don't Read Horror (and other weird tales) by Lee Murray (Interstellar Flight Magazine)
- Vampire, the Ageless Monster, Tim Hawken (Aurealis Magazine)
- No Horror Without the Body, Tabatha Wood (Self-published)

=== Poetry ===
==== Winner ====
- Hip Gnomes, P. S. Cottier (Antipodean SF)

==== Nominees ====
- Night Terrors, L. E. Daniels
- How Does Your Garden Grow?, Gene Flynn (Hybrid: Misfits, Monsters and Other Phenomena)
- If I Touch You, You'll Know, Rebecca Fraser (Nightmare Fuel Magazine)

=== Graphic Novel ===
==== Winner ====
- Gorilla My Dreams Team-Up #1: When Freaks Collide, Big Tim Stiles (Big Tim's Funny Books)

==== Nominees ====
- How to Win a Raid, Emmet O’Cuana (Bird's Eye Comics)
- Batrisha and the Creepy Caretaker, Dillon Naylor (Comicoz)

=== Edited Work ===
==== Winner ====
- Death in the Mouth: An Anthology of Original Horror by People of Colour, Cassie Hart and Sloane Leong, eds. (self-published)

==== Nominees ====
- Found: An Anthology of Found Footage Horror Stories, Andrew Cull & Gabino Iglesias, eds. (Vermillion2One Press)
- Midnight Echo #17, Greg Chapman, ed. (AHWA)

=== Collected Work ===
==== Winner ====
- Hard Places, Kirstyn McDermott (Trepidation Publishing)

==== Nominees ====
- Cut to Care: A Collection of Little Hurts, Aaron Dries (IFWG Australia)
- Liminal Spaces: Horror Stories, Deborah Sheldon (IFWG Australia)
- The Devil Took Her: Tales of Horror, Michael Botur (The Sager Group)
- Reflections, Tabatha Wood (Wild Wood Books)

=== Short Fiction ===
==== Winner ====
- Little Balloons, Aaron Dries (Cut To Care: A Collection of Little Hurts)

==== Nominees ====
- Break the Skin If You Have To, Emma Osborne, Cadwell Turnbull and Jess Essey (Nightmare Magazine)
- They Call Me Mother, Geneve Flynn (Classic Monsters Unleashed)
- The Tub, J. Ashley Smith (Midnight Echo #17)

=== The Paul Haines Award for Long Fiction ===
==== Winner ====
- And Then I Woke Up, Malcolm Devlin (Tor.com)

==== Nominees ====
- Among The Faded Woods, Faith Mudge (The Art of Being Human)
- Kookaburra Cruel by Aaron Dries (Damnation Games)

=== Novel ===
==== Winner ====
- The Path of Thorns, Angela Slatter (Titan Books)

==== Nominees ====
- The Stone Road, Trent Jamieson (Erewhon Books)
- Denizen, James McKenzie Watson (Viking)
- Red Ruin, Ian J. Middleton and Denver Grenell (Self-published)

== 2023 ==
=== Rocky Wood Award for Non-Fiction and Criticism ===
==== Winner ====
- A Vindication of Monsters, Claire Fitzpatrick, ed. (IFWG Publishing International)

==== Nominees ====
- Displaced Spirits: Ghosts of the Diaspora by Lee Murray (Unquiet Spirits: Essays by Asian Women in Horror)
- Holy Revelations, Grace Chan (Unquiet Spirits: Essays by Asian Women in Horror)

=== Poetry ===
==== Winner ====
- What It Means to be With You, Pauline Yates (HWA Poetry Showcase Volume X)

==== Nominees ====
- The Broonie, Deborah Sheldon (Nightmare Fuel Magazine)
- Dancers on the Road, K. S. Nikakis (SOV Media)
- Guiding Star, Tim Jones (Remains to be Told Dark Tales of Aotearoa)
- Never Leave the Path, Kyla Lee Ward (Eternal Haunted Summer)

=== Graphic Novel ===
==== Winner ====
- Fables of Fear, Karl Brandt, (art by David Parsons) (KB Comics)

==== Nominees ====
- Monomyth, David Hazan (Mad Cave Studios)
- Splitting Sides 2, David Schembri (North Forest Books)
- Yuletide Flame, Hayden Fryer (Siberian Productions)

=== Edited Work ===
==== Winner ====
- Killer Creatures Down Under, Deborah Sheldon, ed. (IFWG Publishing)

==== Nominees ====
- Black Beacon Book of Horror, Cameron Trost, ed. (Black Beacon Books)
- Remains to be Told, Lee Murray, ed. (Clan Destine Press)
- SNAFU Punk’d, Geoff Brown and Amanda J. Spedding, eds. (Cohesion Press)

=== Collected Work ===
==== Winner ====
- Midnight Masquerades, Greg Chapman (IFWG Publishing International)

==== Nominees ====
- Bites Eyes, Matthew R. Davis (Brain Jar Press)
- Precarious Waters, Pamela Jeffs (Four Ink Press)
- Stingers, Noel Osualdini & T.M. McLean (Self-published)

=== Short Fiction ===
==== Winner ====
- All the Eyes That See, Alan Baxter (Cosmic Horror Monthly #42)

==== Nominees ====
- Camp Never, J. S. Bruekelaar
- Death Interrupted, Pamela Jeffs
- What Bones These Tides Bring, Nikky Lee (Remains to be Told Dark Tales of Aotearoa)

=== The Paul Haines Award for Long Fiction ===
==== Winner ====
- Bitters, Kaaron Warren (Cemetery Dance Books)

==== Nominees ====
- After I Found Her, Claire Low (This Fresh Hell)
- Those That Pursue Us Yet, Kyla Ward (Independent Legion Publishing)
- We Called it Graffitiville, Aaron Dries (Vandal: Stories of Damage)

=== Novel ===
==== Winner ====
- When Ghosts Call Us Home, Katya de Becerra (Page Street Publishing (US), Pan Macmillan (UK/AU/NZ))

==== Nominees ====
- Cretaceous Canyon, Deborah Sheldon (Severed Press)
- The Graveyard Shift, Maria Lewis (Angry Robot/Datura)
- Polyphemus, Zachary Ashford (Darklit Press)

== 2024 ==
=== Rocky Wood Award for Non-fiction and Criticism ===
==== Winner ====
- Long be nightmar’d [Kyla Ward] (JOURN-E 3.1, Mind's Eye Publications)

==== Nominees ====
- A Little Bit of Adrenaline is my Favourite Medicine, Tee Wood (Tabatha Wood, self-published)

=== Poetry ===
==== Winners ====
- Fox Spirit on a Distant Cloud, Lee Murray (The Cuba Press)
- You Swallowed Your Tongue, Geneve Flynn (Bestiary of Blood: Modern Fables & Dark Tales, Crystal Lake Publishing)

==== Nominees ====
- You Had to Learn How to Live After Her, Monica Carroll (Midnight Echo #19, Australasian Horror Writers Association)
- Galérien, Deborah Sheldon (Illumen Magazine Summer 2024, Hiraeth Publishing)
- Hot Enough to Collapse, Eugen Bacon (Galaxy Science Fiction #263, Starship Sloane Publishing Company, Inc.)
- Just an Unnerving Sensation, Pauline Yates (HWA Poetry Showcase Volume XI, HWA)

=== Graphic Novel or Comic ===
==== Winner ====
- Gourmand Go, Jason Franks

==== Nominees ====
No shortlist

=== Edited work ===
- Death in the Mouth Volume 2: Original Horror from the Margins, Sloane Leong and Cassie Hart (eds) (Sloane Leong and Cassie Hart)

==== Nominees ====
- Nosferatu Unbound, Steven Paulsen and Christopher Sequeira (eds) (IFWG Publishing International)
- Found 2: More Stories of Found Footage Horror, Andrew Cull and Gabino Iglesias (eds) (Vermillion2One Press)
- Monsters in the Mills, L. E. Daniels and Christa Carmen (eds) (Interactive Publications Pty Ltd)
- Midnight Echo #19, Dan Rabarts (ed) (Australasian Horror Writers Association)

=== Collected Work ===
==== Winner ====
- Black Days and Bloody Nights, Greg Chapman (IFWG Publishing)

==== Nominees ====
- Remixed Myths, Jeff Clulow (Third Eye Press)
- The Dark Man, by Referral and Less Pleasant Tales, Chuck McKenzie (Daft Notions)

=== Short Fiction ===
==== Winner ====
- Archive of the Dead, Pamela Jeffs (SNAFU: AI Insurrection, Cohesion Press)

==== Nominees ====
- The Absolute, Aaron Dries (Grimdark Magazine)
- The Gift, Chuck McKenzie (Daft Notions, self-published)
- We Have Children Now, Anthony O’Connor (Spawn 2: More Weird Horror Tales About Pregnancy, Birth and Babies, IFWG)
- Sleep, Empty, Matt Tighe (The NoSleep Podcast S21E11, The NoSleep Podcast)
- Envelopes, Matt Tighe (Spawn 2: More Weird Horror Tales About Pregnancy, Birth and Babies, IFWG)

=== Paul Haines Award for Long Fiction ===
==== Winner ====
- Redhead Town, Deborah Sheldon (PsychoToxin Press, USA)

==== Nominees ====
- The Emporium, Kaaron Warren (Meerkat Press)
- Maleficium, Kyla Lee Ward (Discontinue If Death Ensues, Flame Tree Publishing, UK)
- Shattered, Pauline Yates (Black Hare Press)
- Effigy in Flagrante, Matthew R. Davis (The Black Beacon Book of Ghosts, Black Beacon Books)

=== Novel ===
==== Winner ====
- The Dead Spot, Caroline Angel (Red Cape Publishing)

==== Nominees ====
- The Briar Book of the Dead, Angela Slatter (Titan Publishing)
- Jasper Cliff, Joshua Kemp (Fremantle Press)
- Remedy, JS Brukelaar (PS Publishing)
- The Underhistory, Kaaron Warren (Viper Books, UK)

== 2025 ==
=== Rocky Wood Award for Non-fiction and Criticism ===
==== Winner ====
- The Horror of Australia's Literary Censorship, Louise Zedda-Sampson

==== Nominees ====
- Folklore Beginnings for Horror Writers, Monica Carroll
- Frankenstein in Pop Culture - Atomic Adaptations, Claire Fitzpatrick
- August Derleth and the Rise of the Cthulhu Mythos, Stephen Herczeg
- Fox Girl: A Speculative Journey, Lee Murray

=== Poetry ===
==== Winner ====
- Anatomy of a Haunting, Katya de Becerra

==== Nominees ====
- Speak, L.E. Daniels
- A Pocket of Soil, Geneve Flynn
- Charcoal Skies, Lee Murray

=== Graphic Novel or Comic ===
==== Nominees ====
No award

=== Edited work ===
==== Winner ====
This Way Lies Madness, Dave Jeffery & Lee Murray, eds

==== Nominees ====
No shortlist

=== Collected work ===
==== Winner ====
- The Leper's Garden: And Other Contagions, Jeff Clulow

==== Nominees ====
- This Dark Architect and Other Grim Tales, Pamela Jeffs
- Shadows of Razorhurst, Craig Stanton
- The Connections We Keep, Pauline Yates

=== Short Fiction ===
==== Winner ====
- If I am to Earn my Tether, Geneve Flynn

==== Nominees ====
- Wrong, Emma Gertz
- Whispers, Martin Livings
- It Will Only Hurt If I Want It To, Kirstyn McDermott
- The Shelter, Carol Ryles
- Bitter Skin, Kaaron Warren

=== Paul Haines Award for Long Fiction ===
==== Winner ====
- The Cold House, A.G. Slatter

==== Nominees ====
- The Leper's Garden, Jeff Clulow
- The Hidden God, T.R. Napper
- The Meatamorphosis, Aaron Sterns
- Drowning in the Dark, Matt Tighe

=== Novel ===
==== Winner ====
- Slashed Beauties, A. Rushby

==== Nominees ====
- Black Soil White Bread, Madeleine D'Este
- The Woman in the Well, Dmetri Kakmi
- The Obituary, Martin Livings
- This Stays Between Us, Margaret McGovern
- The Crimson Road, A.G. Slatter
