= Aurealis Award for Best Horror Novella =

Australian horror novella award

Aurealis Award for best horror novella
- Awarded for: Excellence in fantasy fiction novels
- Country: Australia
- Presented by: Chimaera Publications, Continuum Foundation
- First award: 2015
- Currently held by: Ron Schroer
- Website: Official site

The Aurealis Awards are presented annually by the Australia-based Chimaera Publications and WASFF to published works in order to "recognise the achievements of Australian science fiction, fantasy, horror writers". To qualify, a work must have been first published by an Australian citizen or permanent resident between 1 January and 31 December of the corresponding year; the presentation ceremony is held the following year. It has grown from a small function of around 20 people to a two-day event attended by over 200 people.

Since their creation in 1995, awards have been given in various categories of speculative fiction. Categories currently include science fiction, fantasy, horror, speculative young adult fiction—with separate awards for novels and short fiction—collections, anthologies, illustrative works or graphic novels, children's books, and an award for excellence in speculative fiction. The awards have attracted the attention of publishers by setting down a benchmark in science fiction and fantasy. The continued sponsorship by publishers such as HarperCollins and Orbit has identified the award as an honour to be taken seriously.

The results are decided by a panel of judges from a list of submitted nominees; the long-list of nominees is reduced to a short-list of finalists. Ties can occur if the panel decides both entries show equal merit, however they are encouraged to choose a single winner. The judges are selected from a public application process by the Award's management team.

This article lists all the short-list nominees and winners in the best horror novella category.

== Winners and nominees ==
In the following table, the years correspond to the year of the story's eligibility; the ceremonies are always held the following year. Each year links to the corresponding "year in literature" article. Entries with a blue background have won the award; those with a white background are the nominees on the short-list. If the short story was originally published in a book with other stories rather than by itself or in a magazine, the book title is included after the publisher's name.

Kaaron Warren and Chris Mason are the first persons to record two wins, while others like Alan Baxter and Angela Slatter have been nominated four times. Data as of the 2025 ceremonies announcing the 2024 winners and the 2025 finalists.

* Winners and joint winners
* Nominees on the shortlist

| Year | Author(s) | Novella | Publisher or publication | Ref |
|---|---|---|---|---|
| 2015 | Deborah Kalin* | "The Miseducation of Mara Lys" | Twelfth Planet Press (Cherry Crow Children) | |
| 2015 | Dirk Flinthart | "Night Shift" | FableCroft Publishing (Striking Fire) | |
| 2015 | Deborah Kalin | "The Cherry Crow Children of Haverny Wood" | Twelfth Planet Press (Cherry Crow Children) | |
| 2015 | Deborah Kalin | "Wages of Honey" | Twelfth Planet Press (Cherry Crow Children) | |
| 2015 | Jay Kristoff | "Sleepless" | Penguin Books (Slasher Boys and Monster Girls) | |
| 2015 | Angela Slatter | "Ripper" | Jo Fletcher Books (Horrorology) | |
| 2016 | Kirstyn McDermott* | "Burnt Sugar" | PS Publishing (Dreaming in the Dark) | |
| 2016 | Jeremy Bates | "Box of Bones" | Ghillinnein Books | |
| 2016 | Alan Baxter | "Served Cold" | PS Publishing (Dreaming in the Dark) | |
| 2016 | Deborah Biancotti | Waking in Winter | PS Publishing | |
| 2016 | Christopher Ruz | "Pan" | Andromeda Spaceways Inflight Magazine (#62) | |
| 2017 | Chris Mason* | "The Stairwell" | Things in the Well (Below the Stairs -- Tales from the Cellar) | |
| 2017 | Bates Jeremy | The Mailman | Ghillinnein Books | |
| 2017 | Andrew Cull | Hope and Walker | Vermillion Press | |
| 2017 | Michael Grey | "Bind" | Fox Spirit Books (Pacific Monsters) | |
| 2017 | Angela Slatter | "No Good Deed" | Titan Books (New Fears 1) | |
| 2017 | Kaaron Warren | "Furtherest" | Cemetery Press (Dark Screams Volume 7) | |
| 2018 | Kaaron Warren* | Crisis Apparition | Dark Moon Books | |
| 2018 | Matthew R. Davis | "Andromeda Ascends" | Things in the Well (Beneath the Waves - Tales from the Deep) | |
| 2018 | David Kuraria | "Kopura Rising" | IFWG Publishing Australia (Cthulhu: Land of the Long White Cloud) | |
| 2018 | Chris Mason | "The Black Sea" | Things in the Well (Beneath the Waves - Tales from the Deep) | |
| 2018 | Kirstyn McDermott | Triquetra | Tor.com | |
| 2018 | Angela Rega | "With This Needle I Thee Thread" | Ticonderoga Publications (Aurum) | |
| 2019 | Kaaron Warren* | "Into Bones Like Oil" | Meerkat Press (Into Bones Like Oil) | |
| 2019 | Alan Baxter | "Yellowheart" | Grey Matter Press (Served Cold) | |
| 2019 | Matthew R. Davis | "Supermassive Black Mass" | (independent) (Short Sharp Shocks! 21) | |
| 2020 | Chris Mason* | "The Saltbush Queen" | Things in the Well (Outback Horrors Down Under) | |
| 2020 | J. Ashley-Smith | "The Attic Tragedy" | Meerkat Press | |
| 2020 | Andrew Cull | "The Cockroach King" | Beneath Hell Publishing | |
| 2020 | Michael Gardner | "Foundations" | Galaxy Press (Writers of the Future Volume 36) | |
| 2020 | Robert Hood | "Bad Weather" | Things in the Well (Outback Horrors Down Under) | |
| 2021 | Alf Simpson* | "All the Long Way Down | IFWG Publishing Australia (Cthulhu Deep Down Under Volume 3) | |
| 2021 | Alan Baxter | "The Band Plays On" | (self-publish) (The Gulp) | |
| 2021 | Alister Hodge | Cryptid Killers | Severed Press | |
| 2021 | Matthew R. Davis | "Hell's Teeth" | Specul8 Publishing (Haunted: An Anthology) | |
| 2021 | Zachary Ashford | When the Cicadas Stop Singing | Horrific Tales Publishing | |
| 2022 | Aaron Dries | "Kookaburra Cruel" | Damnation Games, Clan Destine Press | |
| 2022 | Jeff Clulow | "Rat's Alley" | From the Wasteland, PS Publishing | |
| 2022 | Matan Elul | "Glyphlight" | The New Mythic, Precipice Fiction | |
| 2022 | Kirstyn McDermott | The New Wife | Brain Jar Press | |
| 2022 | Faith Mudge | "Among the Faded Woods" | The Art of Being Human, FableCroft Publishing | |
| 2022 | Angela Slatter | "Songs from Dark Annie's Bower" | Gaslight Ghouls: Uneasy Tales of Sherlock Holmes, Belanger Books | |
| 2023 | J. S. Breukelaar | "Quicksilver" | Vandal: Stories of damage, Crystal Lake Entertainment | |
| 2023 | Zachary Ashford | The morass | Crystal Lake Entertainment | |
| 2023 | Alan Baxter | The leaves forget | Absinthe Books | |
| 2023 | J. S. Breukelaar | "Hole World" | Apex Magazine #141 | |
| 2023 | Madeleine D'Este | Radcliffe | Deadset Press | |
| 2023 | Kaaron Warren | Bitters | Cemetery Dance | |
| 2024 | Pauline Yates | Shattered | Black Hare Press | |
| 2024 | Nikky Lee | "We Who Remain" | Night So Dark and Full of Stars, Deadset Press | |
| 2024 | Tansy Rayner Roberts | "A Daredevil Duchess's Guide to Castle Hauntings" | (self-published) | |
| 2024 | Angela Slatter | "Bell, Book and Lamp" | Bound in Blood, Titan Books | |
| 2024 | Kyla Ward | "Maleficium" | Discontinue If Death Ensues, Flame Tree Publishing | |
| 2025 | Ron Schroer | "Walpurgis" | Strange Legacy 2025: Creature Feature, Thorncroft Legacy | |
| 2025 | Eugen Bacon | The Nga'phandileh Whisperer | Stars and Sabers | |
| 2025 | J. J. Carpenter | Sideshow Souls | (self-published) | |
| 2025 | Jessica A. McMinn | Parasitic Omens | (self-published) | |
| 2025 | Helena O'Connor | Willow Close | IFWG | |
| 2025 | A. G. Slatter | The Cold House | Titan Books | |

== See also ==
- Ditmar Award, an Australian science fiction award established in 1969
