= Andrew J. McKiernan =

Australian writer and illustrator

Andrew J McKiernan
- Born: 25 September 1970 (age 55); Sydney, Australia
- Occupation: Writer/Illustrator
- Writing career
- Pen name: Andrew McKiernan
- Period: 2006 to present
- Genre: Horror fiction/Science Fiction/Fantasy/Speculative fiction
- Website: andrewmckiernan.com

Andrew J McKiernan (born 1970, Sydney, Australia) is an Australian speculative fiction writer and illustrator.

Andrew J McKiernan is a member of the Australian Horror Writers Association, and was the Art Director for Aurealis Magazine for eight years (2006–2017). He was listed as a featured illustrator in the 2005 release Australian Speculative Fiction: A Genre Overview. McKiernan is also a founding editor of the HorrorScope: The Australian Dark Fiction Web Log, an online news and reviews webzine.

In 2003, McKiernan founded Kephra Design, a business specialising in graphic design, illustration and web development. McKiernan's web development work has mainly been focussed in servicing the particulars of the publishing market. Through Kephra Design he has designed and developed, or been involved with the development of, websites for authors such as Russell Kirkpatrick, Karen Miller, Kylie Chan, Trudi Canavan, Marianne de Pierres and Nathan Burrage, as well as publishers and organisations such as Eneit Press, Good Reading magazine, Aurealis and the Australian Horror Writers Association. In 2009, McKiernan received Ditmar Award nominations for Best Artwork and Best Fan Artist.

In 2010, McKiernan's short story "The Message" received short listing nominations for both a 2009 Aurealis Award (Horror Short Story) and 2009 Australian Shadows Award (Short Fiction).

In 2011, McKiernan's novelette "All the Clowns in Clowntown" received nominations for the 2010 Australian Shadows Award (Short Fiction), an Aurealis Award (Fantasy Short Story) and a Ditmar Award (Novella or Novelette). His wrap-around dust jacket for the hard-cover edition of Richard L. Tierney's "SAVAGE MENACE & Other Poems of Horror" was also short-listed for a Best Artwork Ditmar Award.

In July 2014, his first collection of short stories, "Last Year, When We Were Young" was published by Melbourne based Satalyte Publishing.

He currently lives on the Central Coast (New South Wales) with his wife and two children.

== Bibliography ==
=== Illustrations ===
- Shards: Forty Short Sharp Tales by Shane Jiraiya Cummings, colour cover plus 39 internal illustrations – Brimstone Press (ISBN 978-0-980-56772-4)
- Sobek's Tears by Shane Jiraiya Cummings, black and white internal illustration – Aurealis #33/34/35 (2004)
- Cover Illustration for Aurealis No. 37 (2006)
- In The Arms of Medusa by Nathan Burrage, black and white internal illustration – Orb No. 7 (2007)
- In Bad Dreams anthology edited by Mark S Deniz and Sharyn Lilley, 5 black and white internal illustration, Eneit Press (ISBN 978-1-873-67100-9) (2007)
- Spirals in the Sky by Nathan Burrage, black and white internal illustration – Aurealis No. 40 (April 2008)
- Ladies Day by Helen Patrice, black and white internal illustration – Aurealis No. 41 (December 2008)
- The Dumbshow by Andrew J McKiernan, black and white internal illustration – Masques Anthology, CSFG (May 2009) (ISBN 978-0-9775192-1-7)
- Coppernic's Sky by Ariella Adler, black and white internal illustration – Masques Anthology, CSFG (May 2009) (ISBN 978-0-9775192-1-7)
- Savage Menace & Other Poems of Horror by Richard L. Tierney, colour wrap-around dust jacket plus internal illustrations – P'rea Press (January 2010) (ISBN 978-0-9804625-5-5)

=== Short stories ===
- "Calliope: A Steam Romance" – Shadow Plays (ed. Elise Bunter), (ISBN 978-0-646-47127-3) (2007)
- "Sleep" – Black Box e-anthology (ed. Shane Jiraiya Cummings, Brimstone Press), (2008)
- "The Dumbshow" – Masques Anthology, CSFG (ed Gillian Polack and Scott Hopkins) (May 2009) (ISBN 978-0-9775192-1-7)
- "The Haunting that Jack Built" – Aurealis No. 42 (ed. Stuart Mayne, Chimaera Publications), (May 2009)
- "The Message" – Midnight Echo #2 (ed. Shane Jiraiya Cummings and Angela Challis, Australian Horror Writers Association), (June 2009)
- "Daivadana" – In Bad Dreams 2: Where Death Stalks (ed. Sharyn Lilley, Eneit Press), (2009) (ISBN 978-0-9806911-0-8)
- "The Memory of Water" – Ecleticism e-zine #13 (ed. Craig Bezant), (July 2010) ()
- "All the Clowns in Clowntown" – Macabre: A Journey Through Australian Horror (ed. Angela Challis and Dr. Marty Young, Brimstone Press), (September 2010)
- "The Desert Song" – Scenes from the Second Storey (ed. Amanda Pillar and Pete Kempshall, Morrigan Books), (September 2010)
- "Love Death" – Aurealis No. 45 (ed. Stuart Mayne, Chimaera Publications), (Forthcoming June 2011)
- "The Wanderer in the Darkness" – Midnight Echo #6 (ed. David Conyers, David Kernot and Jason Fischer, Australian Horror Writers Association), (Forthcoming July 2011)
- "White Lines, White Crosses" – Night Terrors Anthology (ed. Karen Henderson), Kayelle Press, (2012)
- "Torch Song" – From Stage Door Shadows (ed. Jodi Gleghorn), Emergent Publishing (2012)
- "The Final Degustation of Doctor Ernest Blenheim" – Midnight Echo #7 (ed. Daniel Russell, Australian Horror Writers Association), (2012)
- "They Don't Know That We Know What They Know" – Midnight Echo #8 (ed. Marty Young, AJ Spedding, Mark Farrugia, Australian Horror Writers Association), (2012)
- "A Prayer for Lazarus" – original to Last Year, When We Were Young – (Satalyte Publishing), (2014) (ISBN 978-0-9925095-2-1)
- "Last Year, When We Were Young" – original to Last Year, When We Were Young – (Satalyte Publishing), (2014) (ISBN 978-0-9925095-2-1)

=== Collections ===
- "Last Year, When We Were Young" – (Satalyte Publishing), (2014) (ISBN 978-0-9925095-2-1)

=== Articles ===
- "Black Roads, Dark Highways: Snake Tales and Outback Hooplah" – article and comic strip in 'Black: Australian Dark Culture Magazine' issue No. 2 (Sept 2008)
- "Black Roads, Dark Highways: Killer Outback, Outback Killers" – article and comic strip in 'Black: Australian Dark Culture Magazine' issue No. 3 (Nov 2008)
