= Brett McBean =

Australian writer

- Born: December 1978 (age 47); Melbourne, Australia
- Occupation: Writer
- Writing career
- Period: 2002–
- Genres: Horror fiction, thriller fiction, speculative fiction
- Notable works: The Mother, Wolf Creek: Desolation Game
- Website: brettmcbean.com

Brett McBean is best known as an award-winning Australian horror, thriller and speculative fiction writer. He was born and raised in Melbourne. He is also a drummer and has an Advanced Diploma from Box Hill College of Music

McBean's novel The Mother was nominated as the "Best Novel" for the 2007 Ditmar Awards (where he was also nominated as "Best New Talent"), a Ned Kelly Award for "Best Novel" of 2007, a 2007 Aurealis Award for "Best Novel," and it received a 2006 honorable mention by the Australian Shadows Awards. His short story collection Tales of Sin and Madness won the 2011 Australian Shadows Award for "Best Collection".

He also has a keen interest in true crime, in particular the infamous Jack the Ripper murders of 1888. He runs a Jack the Ripper website, Saucy Jacky, in which he reviews Ripper movies and literature, and shares his thoughts about popular suspects and Ripper victims.

== Selected bibliography ==
=== Novels ===
- Wolf Creek: Desolation Game (2014, Penguin Books Australia, co-written with Greg McLean)
- The Awakening (2012, Tasmaniac Publications)
- The Mother (2006, Lothian Books)
- The Last Motel (2002, Wild Roses Productions/2005, Biting Dog Press) (2011, LegumeMan Books updated edition)

=== Novellas and novelettes ===
- Buk and Jimmy Go West (2013, LegumeMan Books)
- Dead Tree Forest (2011, Delirium Books)
- "Jungle" trilogy (Concrete Jungle / Neighbourhood Jungle / Suburban Jungle 2010, 2011, 2013, Tasmaniac Publications)
- The Familiar Stranger (2006, Necessary Evil Press)

=== Short story collections ===
- Tales of Sin and Madness (2008, Thunderstorm Books) (2010, LegumeMan Books updated edition)

=== Articles ===
- "On Research, Dead Trees and Horror in Australia," for the Australian Horror Writers Association
