= Southern Blood (book) =

2003 anthology edited by Bill Congreve

Southern Blood: New Australian Tales of the Supernatural
- Southern Blood first edition cover.
- Author: Bill Congreve (editor)
- Cover artist: Nick Stathopoulos
- Language: English
- Genre: Speculative fiction anthology
- Publisher: Sandglass Enterprises
- Publication date: June 2003
- Publication place: Australia
- Media type: Print (Paperback)
- Pages: 320 pp (first edition)
- ISBN: 0-9580739-0-2

Southern Blood: New Australian Tales of the Supernatural is a 2003 speculative fiction anthology edited by Bill Congreve.

== Background ==
Southern Blood was first published in Australia in June 2003 by Sandglass Enterprises in trade paperback format. It was a short-list nominee for best anthology at the 2004 Bram Stoker Awards and the 2004 International Horror Guild Awards and for best collected work at the 2004 Ditmar Awards. Southern Blood features 16 stories from 16 authors. One of the stories, "La Sentinelle" by Lucy Sussex won the 2003 Aurealis Award for best fantasy short story and the 2004 Ditmar Award for best novella or novelette. It was also a short-list nominee at the 2004 International Horror Guild Awards for best medium fiction but lost to Glen Hirshberg's "Dancing Men". Kirstyn McDermott's "The Truth About Pug Roberts" was a short-list nominee for the 2004 Ditmar Award for best short story but lost to Trudi Canavan's "A Room for Improvement".

== Contents ==
- "Waiting at Golgotha", short story by Simon Brown
- "The Truth About Pug Roberts", short fiction by Kirstyn McDermott
- "Relish", short fiction by David Carroll
- "The Pique of Death", short fiction by Naomi Hatchman
- "Legacy", shortfiction by Bill Congreve
- "Stone by Stone", short fiction by Deborah Biancotti
- "La Sentinelle", novelette by Lucy Sussex
- "Madly", short fiction by Stephen Dedman
- "In the Shadow of the Stones", short fiction by Rosaleen Love
- "In Quinn's Paddock", short fiction by Rick Kennett
- "Hunting Ground", short fiction by Sean Williams
- "Doing Shadow Time", short fiction by Sue Isle
- "Blue Eyes", short fiction by George Ivanoff
- "Beware! The Pincushionman", short fiction by Robert Hood
- "Basic Black", novelette by Terry Dowling
- "A Sixpence for Sophie", short fiction by Geoffrey Maloney
