= Karen Simpson Nikakis =

Australian fantasy author, writer and poet

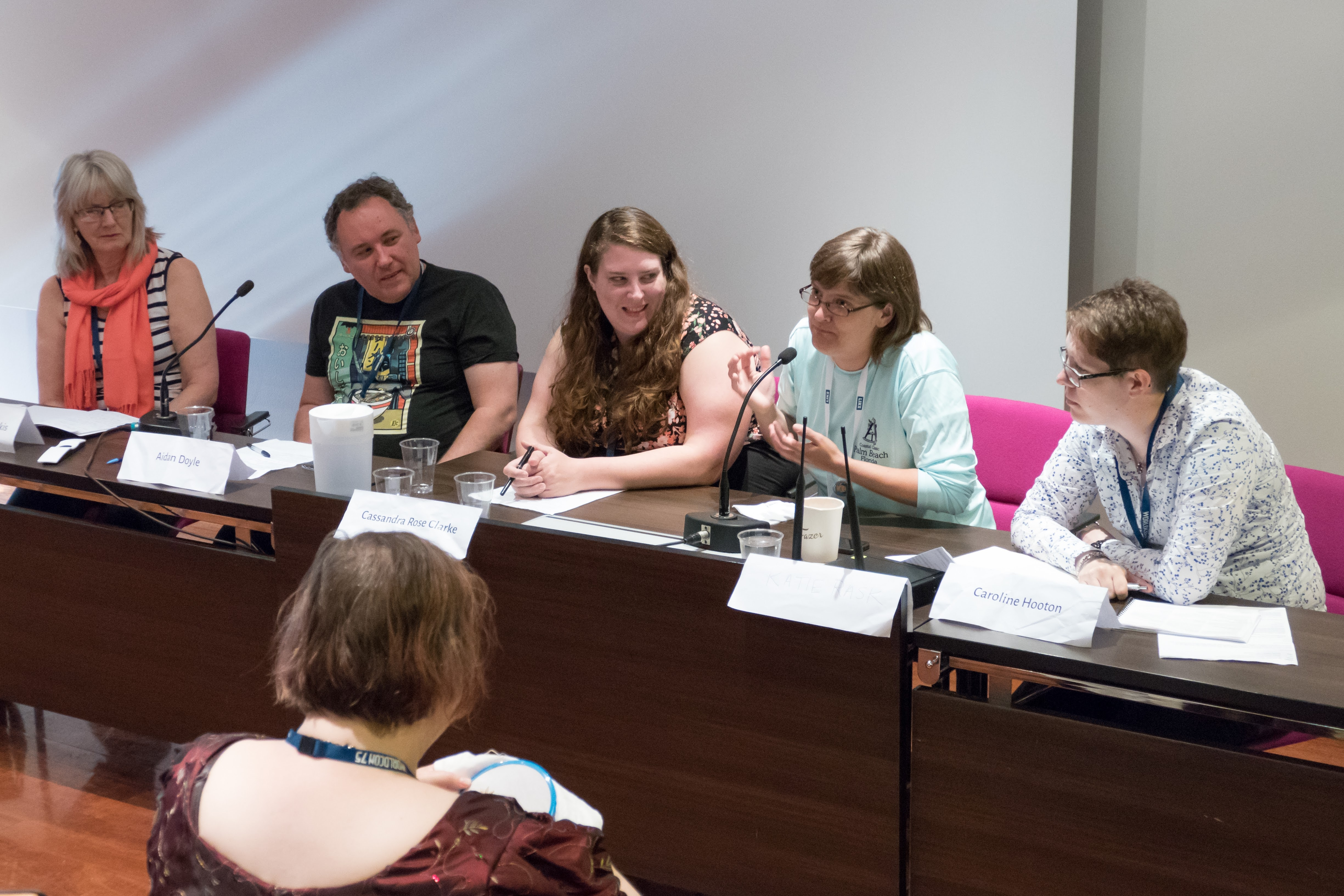
- Nikakis, far left, 2017
- Born: Mansfield, Victoria, Australia
- Occupations: Novelist, lecturer in writing
- Writing career
- Period: 2007–present
- Genre: Fantasy
- Notable awards: Australian Shadows Awards (2020 runner up, poetry); Aurealis Awards (2020, two nominations)
- Website: www.ksnikakis.com

Karen Simpson Nikakis, known commonly as K. S. Nikakis, is an Australian fantasy author, writer and poet who lives at Melton, who has written the fantasy novel The Whisper of Leaves (2007). She was nominated for an Aurealis Awards twice in 2020.

== Early life ==
Nikakis was raised in the central Victorian town of Mansfield, surrounded by the mountains of the Victorian Alps. Her interest in fantasy occurred at age 19, when she read Tolkien's fantasy epic The Lord of the Rings. She has since written a number of published academic essays on myth and fantasy writing.

She has worked as a secondary teacher, a technical and further education teacher, and as a lecturer in business communications at Deakin University. She completed a Master in Education in young adult literature with her thesis being on The Purpose of Dragons in Selected Children’s Literature in the Twentieth Century at Charles Sturt University and went on to complete a PhD in 1997 in fantasy fiction from Victoria University with her thesis on The Use of Narrative in Order to Break the Masculine Domination of the Hero Quest.

== Writing ==
During the 1980s, she started writing picture story books, which she also illustrated. Her first fantasy novel was published by Allen & Unwin in 2007 as The Whisper of Leaves, the first book in a fantasy series: the Kira Chronicles. A second book The Song of the Silvercades was released in July 2008.

In 2008, she was appointed the foundation head of the bachelor's degree in Writing and Publishing for Northern Melbourne Institute of TAFE.

In 2020, she was a runner up for Australian Shadows Awards poetry award. The same year her book I Heard the Wolf Call My Name was nominated for a Aurealis Awards for Young Adult Novel and her short story Glass-Heart was nominated for the Young Adult Short Story award.

== Works ==
=== Novels ===
- The Whisper of Leaves: Book 1 of the Kira Chronicles (2007) Allen & Unwin, ISBN 0-8093-2480-6
- The Song of the Silvercades: Book 2 of the Kira Chronicles (2008) Allen & Unwin
- The Cry of the Marwing: Book 3 of the Kira Chronicles (July 2009) Allen & Unwin

=== Short stories ===
- The gift in Aurealis #40, Chimaera Publications, Australia, 2008
- Redemption in Moondance – E-zine: USA
- Lovers in Smokelong Quarterly – E-zine: USA
- Song of the frog prince in Zahir #4: USA
