= Chuck McKenzie =

Australian writer of speculative fiction (born 1970)

- Born: 1970 (age 55–56); Melbourne, Australia
- Occupation: Author
- Writing career
- Period: 1999–present
- Genre: Speculative fiction

Chuck McKenzie is an Australian writer of speculative fiction.

== Biography ==
McKenzie was born in Melbourne, Australia, in 1970. He holds a Bachelor of Arts in Professional Writing & Literature from Deakin University. McKenzie's varied work history includes stints as a telemarketer, a restaurant manager, a retail lighting salesman, Club DJ, television actor, and bookseller.

Between 1990 and 1998, McKenzie enjoyed some success as a playwright and feature writer for mainstream publications, with his first work of fiction - the novel Worlds Apart - published in 1999.

From 2012 to 2014 McKenzie owned and operated Notions Unlimited Bookshop, which specialized in science fiction, fantasy, horror, and related genres. He has also sat on the judging panels for both the Aurealis and Australian Shadows awards on several occasions.

He received his first award nomination in 2002 for the anthology AustrAlien Absurdities which he co-edited with Tansy Rayner Roberts. It was nominated for the 2003 Ditmar Award for best Australian collected work but lost to Cat Sparks' anthology Agog! Fantastic Fiction.

McKenzie has been nominated on seven other occasions for his work in short fiction and as a fan writer.

== Awards and nominations ==
Year	Award	Work	Category	Result
2003	Ditmar Award	AustrAlien Absurdities (with Tansy Rayner Roberts as editors)	Best Australian collected work	Nomination
2004	Ditmar Award	"Alien Space Nazis Must Die"	Best Australian novella or novelette	Nomination
2004	Ditmar Award	"The Mark of His Hands"	Best short story	Nomination
2005	Aurealis Award	"Eight-Beat Bar"	Best horror short story	Nomination
2009	Ditmar Award	For work in HorrorScope	Best fan writer	Nomination
2010	Ditmar Award	For work in HorrorScope	Best fan writer	Nomination
2010	Ditmar Award	"The Dead Walk! ... Into a Bookstore Near You"	William Atheling Jr. Award	Nomination
2011	Ditmar Award	For work in HorrorScope	Best fan writer	Nomination

== Bibliography ==
=== Novels ===
- Worlds Apart (1999), Hybrid Publishers

=== Anthologies ===
As editor

- AustrAlien Absurdities (2002, co-edited with Tansy Rayner Roberts), Agog! Press

=== Collections ===
- Confessions of a Pod Person (2005) Mirrordanse Books

=== Short fiction ===
- "Old Habits Die" (2001) in Antipodean SF (ed. Ion Newcombe)
- "Conquest!" (2002) in Antipodean SF (ed. Ion Newcombe)
- "Tools of the Trade" (2002) in AustrAlien Absurdities (ed. Chuck McKenzie & Tansy Rayner Roberts)
- "Confessions of a Pod Person" (2002) in Passing Strange (ed. Bill Congreve)
- "Catflap" (2002) in Aurealis No. 29, (ed. Keith Stevenson)
- "Incident at Five Mile Creek" (2002) in Agog! Fantastic Fiction (ed. Cat Sparks)
- "Boarding Pass" (2002) in Andromeda Spaceways Inflight Magazine No. 1, (ed. Ben Payne)
- "Janus" (2002) in Antipodean SF (ed. Ion Newcombe)
- "Alien Space Nazis Must Die!" (2003) in Elsewhere (ed. Michael Barry)
- "The Mark of His Hands" (2003) in Orb Speculative Fiction No. 5 (ed. Sarah Endacott)
- "Predatory Instincts" (2003) in Borderlands
- "Full Circle" (2003) in Antipodean SF (ed. Ion Newcombe)
- "Customer Service" (2003) in Planet Relish
- "Retail Therapy" (2004) in Orb Speculative Fiction No. 6 (ed. Sarah Endacott)
- "Eight-Beat Bar" (2004) in Aurealis (ed. Keith Stevenson)
- "Daily Grind" (2004) in Infinitas Bookshop Newsletter
- "Literality" (2004) in AurealisXpress
- "Ten Tales of Speculative Fiction" (2004) in Antipodean SF (ed. Ion Newcombe)
- "Tragedy" (2005) in Antipodean SF (ed. Ion Newcombe)
- "Like a Bug Underfoot" (2005) in Daikaiju! Giant Monster Tales (ed. Robin Pen & Robert Hood)
- "The Shadow Over Bexley" (2005) in Simulacrum Issue 6
- "All I Want For Christmas" (2005) in Confessions of a Pod Person (collection)
- "Howler" (2005) in Confessions of a Pod Person (collection)
- "Wiping the Smile Off" (2005) in Antipodean SF (ed. Ion Newcombe)
- "Chrysalis" (2006) in Infinitas Bookshop Newsletter
- "Marlowe Strawl" (2006) in Antipodean SF (ed. Ion Newcombe)
- "Moth" (2006) in Antipodean SF (ed. Ion Newcombe)
- "The Second-Hand Bookshop of Al Hazred" (2006) in Andromeda Spaceways Inflight Magazine No. 24, (ed. Edwina Harvey)
- "What Goes Uptime" (2006) in Antipodean SF (ed. Ion Newcombe)
- "Bad Meat" (2010) in Andromeda Spaceways Inflight Magazine No. 44, (ed. Felicity Dowker)

=== Essays ===
- "Laugh, You Alien Scum!" (1999) in Altair No. 4 (ed. Andrew Collings, Jim Deed, Robert N. Stephenson)
- "The Dead Walk! ... Into a Bookstore Near You" (2009) in Eye of Fire No.1 (Brimstone Press)

=== Other ===
- Introduction to Johnny Phillips, Werewolf Detective: The Complete Case Files (2008) by Robbie Matthews (ASF)
- "Cthulhu Cultus Australis: The Australian Perspective on H. P. Lovecraft" (2008), symposium in Studies in Australian Weird Fiction Issue 2 (ed. Benjamin Szumskyj)
- "Horrors in Store" column (2008) in Black Magazine, Issues 1-3
- Staff Reviewer for HorrorScope, 2008-2011
- Editor-in-Chief of NecroScope: The Australian Zombie Review Blog, 2010-2012
