= Zeroes (novel) =

2015 novel

- Author: Scott Westerfeld; Margo Lanagan; Deborah Biancotti
- Language: English
- Series: Zeroes
- Genre: Science fiction
- Publisher: Simon & Schuster
- Publication date: 29 September 2015
- Media type: Print (hardback & paperback)
- ISBN: 1471124908
- OCLC: 939706938
- Followed by: Swarm

Zeroes is a science fiction novel by Scott Westerfeld, Margo Lanagan and Deborah Biancotti. It is the first novel in the Zeroes series.

== Plot ==
The book follows six teenagers, all born in the year 2000, who have superpowers with huge drawbacks.

== Reception ==
Tasha Robinson of NPR gave a positive review of the book, stating "Zeroes is a trilogy launch, and it openly leaves room for development that's still to come. But it also leaves room for a little joy amid the turmoil, and a sense that even limited, troublemaking supernatural abilities would be worth the hassle." Michael Berry of Common Sense Media gave the book four stars out of five, calling it a "Clever but overlong tale of superpowered misfit teens." Kirkus Reviews states "In this series opener by three acclaimed authors, intriguing protagonists and cinematic powers will surely please adventure fans who don't mind an ensemble developed at the expense of the individual."
