= Deborah Biancotti =

Australian writer

- Born: 1971 (age 54–55); Cairns, Queensland, Australia
- Writing career
- Period: 2000–present
- Genre: Speculative fiction
- Website: deborahbiancotti.net

Deborah Biancotti is an Australian writer of speculative fiction.

== Biography ==
Biancotti was born in 1971 in Cairns, Queensland, Australia. Her first work was published in 2000 with her short story "The First and Final Game" which was featured in Altair and won the 2000 Aurealis Award for best horror short story. In 2001 she won the Ditmar Award for best new talent. Biancotti's fifth short story, "King of All and the Metal Sentinel" was published in 2002 and won the 2003 Ditmar Award for best Australian short fiction. In 2007 her story "A Scar for Leida" won the Aurealis Award for best young-adult short story. Biancotti is now based in Sydney.

== Awards and nominations ==
| Year | Award | Work | Category | Result |
|---|---|---|---|---|
| 2000 | Aurealis Award | "The First and Final Game" | Best horror short story | Won |
| 2001 | Ditmar Award | – | Best new talent | Won |
| 2001 | Ditmar Award | "The First and Final Game" | Best short story | Nomination |
| 2002 | Ditmar Award | – | Best fan writer | Nomination |
| 2003 | Ditmar Award | "King of All and the Metal Sentinel" | Best Australian short fiction | Won |
| 2004 | Ditmar Award | "The Singular Life of Eddy Dovewater" | Best short story | Nomination |
| 2005 | Ditmar Award | "Number 3 Raw Place" | Best short story | Nomination |
| 2006 | Aurealis Award | "The Dying Light" | Best young-adult short story | Nomination |
| 2006 | Australian Shadows Award | "The Dying Light" | – | Nomination |
| 2006 | Ditmar Award | "Summa Seltzer Missive" | Best short story | Nomination |
| 2007 | Aurealis Award | "A Scar for Leida" | Best young-adult short story | Won |
| 2007 | Ditmar Award | "Surrender 1: Rope Artist" | Best short story | Nomination |
| 2008 | Aurealis Award | "Pale Dark Soldier" | Best horror short story | Nomination |
| 2008 | Aurealis Award | "The Tailor of Time" | Best young-adult short story | Nomination |
| 2008 | Ditmar Award | – (with Jonathan Strahan, Garth Nix, Trevor Stafford) | Professional achievement | Nomination |
| 2008 | Ditmar Award | "A Scar for Leida" | Best short story | Nomination |
| 2009 | Aurealis Award | A Book of Endings | Best collection | Nomination |
| 2009 | Australian Shadows Awards | A Book of Endings | Best long fiction | Nomination |
| 2009 | Australian Shadows Awards | "Six Suicides" | Best short fiction | Won |
| 2009 | Ditmar Award | "Pale Dark Soldier" | Best short story | Nomination |
| 2010 | Crawford Award | A Book of Endings | – | Nomination |
| 2010 | Ditmar Award | A Book of Endings | Best collected work | Nomination |
| 2010 | Ditmar Award | "Six Suicides" | Best short story | Nomination |
| 2010 | Locus Award | A Book of Endings | Best collection | Nomination |

== Bibliography ==
=== Short fiction ===
- "The First and Final Game" (2000) in Altair #6/7 (ed. Robert N. Stephenson, Jim Deed, Andrew Collings)
- "All the Monochrome Butterflies" (2001) in Mitch?2: Tarts of the New Millennium
- "Fixing the Glitch" (2001) in Mitch?3: Hacks to the Max
- "Life's Work" (2002) in Passing Strange (ed. Bill Congreve)
- "The Razor Salesman" (2002) in Ideomancer Unbound (ed. Chris Clarke, Mikal Trimm)
- "Silicon Cast" (2002) in Redsine Seven (ed. Garry Nurrish)
- "King of All and the Metal Sentinel" (2002) in Agog! Fantastic Fiction (ed. Cat Sparks)
- "The Distance Keeper" (2003) in Borderlands No. 1
- "The Singular Life of Eddy Dovewater" (2003) in Agog! Terrific Tales (ed. Cat Sparks)
- "Stone by Stone" (2003) in Southern Blood: New Australian Tales of the Supernatural (ed. Bill Congreve)
- "Number 3 Raw Place" (2004) in Agog! Smashing Stories (ed. Cat Sparks)
- "Cinnamon Gate" (2004) in Orb Speculative Fiction No. 6 (ed. Sarah Endacott)
- "Syrup" (2005) in ConSensual a Trois (ed. Cathy Cupitt, Stephen Dedman, Elaine Kemp)
- "Six of One" (2005) in Mitch? 4: Slow Dancing Through Quicksand
- "Summa Seltzer Missive" (2005) in Ticonderoga Online No. 6 (ed. Russell B. Farr, Liz Grzyb, Lyn Battersby)
- "Surrender I: Rope Artist" (2006) in Shadowed Realms (ed. Angela Challis, Shane Jiraiya Cummings)
- "Stealing Free" (2006) in Agog! Ripping Reads (ed. Cat Sparks)
- "The Dying Light" (2006) in Eidolon I (ed. Jeremy G. Byrne, Jonathan Strahan)
- "A Scar for Leida" (2007) in Fantastic Wonder Stories (ed. Russell B. Farr)
- "The Tailor of Time" (2008) in Clockwork Phoenix (ed. Mike Allen)
- "Conversations" (2008) in Dog Versus Sandwich (ed. Ben Payne)
- "Watertight Lies" (2008) in 2012 (ed. Alisa Krasnostein, Ben Payne)
- "The Tailor of Time" (2008) in Clockwork Phoenix (ed. Mike Allen)
- "Pale Dark Soldier" (2008) in Midnight Echo (ed. Kirstyn McDermitt, Ian Mond)
- "Seven Ages of the Protagonist" (2008) in Scary Food (ed. Cat Sparks)
- "Coming Up for Air" (2009) in A Book of Endings (ed. Alisa Krasnostein, Ben Payne)
- "Diamond Shell" (2009) in A Book of Endings (ed. Alisa Krasnostein, Ben Payne)
- "This Time, Longing" (2009) in A Book of Endings (ed. Alisa Krasnostein, Ben Payne)
- "Six Suicides" (2009) in A Book of Endings (ed. Alisa Krasnostein, Ben Payne)
- "Problems of Light and Dark" (2009) in A Book of Endings (ed. Alisa Krasnostein, Ben Payne)
- "Hush" (2009) in A Book of Endings (ed. Alisa Krasnostein, Ben Payne)
- "And the Dead Shall Outnumber the Living" (2010) in Ishtar (ed. Mark Deniz)
- "Home Turf" (2010) in Baggage (ed. Gillian Polack)
- "No Going Home" (2010) in Sprawl (ed. Alisa Krasnostein)
- "All the Lost Ones" (2013) in Exotic Gothic 5, Vol. I (ed. Danel Olson)

=== Collections ===
- A Book of Endings (2009)
- Bad Power (2011)

=== Novella ===
- Waking in Winter (2016)

=== Novels ===
- Zeroes (2015) (co-authored with Scott Westerfeld and Margo Lanagan)
