= Shane Jiraiya Cummings =

Australian author and editor (born 1974)

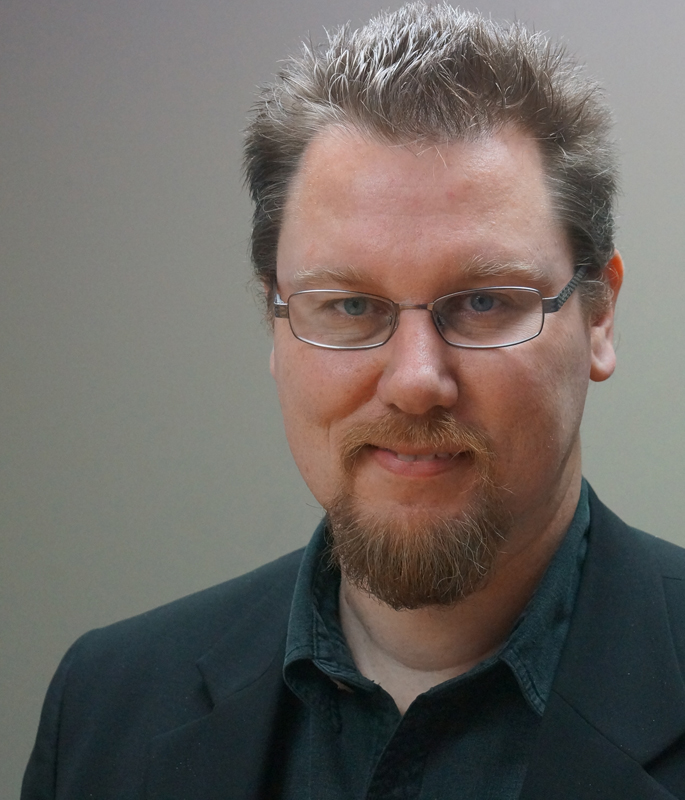
- Cummings in 2014
- Born: 24 April 1974 (age 52); Sydney, Australia
- Occupations: Writer editor
- Writing career
- Period: 2003 to present
- Genres: Horror fiction Fantasy; Speculative fiction
- Movement: Dark fiction
- Website: jiraiya.com.au

Shane Jiraiya Cummings (born 24 April 1974) is an Australian horror and fantasy author and editor. He lives in Sydney. Cummings is best known as a short story writer. He has had more than 100 short stories published in Australia, New Zealand, North America, Europe, and Asia. As of 2015, he has written 12 books and edited 10 genre fiction magazines and anthologies, including the bestselling Rage Against the Night.

== Early life ==
Born in Sydney, Australia as Shane Cummings, he has used "Jiraiya" as his part of his legal name since his Iga-ryu Ninjutsu and Sports Chanbara sensei Kazuo "Crando" Saito bestowed the name to him in the early 1990s when he attained his black belt in Ninjutsu.

He lived for many years in Perth, Western Australia and Wellington, New Zealand, before returning to Sydney in 2015.

== Education ==
Cummings graduated from Whitireia New Zealand's Creative Writing programme with a Bachelor of Applied Arts (Creative Writing) in 2014.

== Writing and publishing ==
In 2004, Cummings co-founded Australian independent publisher Brimstone Press and Shadowed Realms online magazine. In 2005, Cummings founded HorrorScope: The Australian Dark Fiction Blog, a news and review blog. He has edited the fiction anthologies Rage Against the Night, Shadow Box, Black Box, Robots and Time, and Australian Dark Fantasy & Horror 2006 edition, and the co-edited the magazines Shadowed Realms, Midnight Echo (issue 2) and Black: Australian Dark Culture.

Cummings is a member of the Australian Horror Writers Association, the Horror Writers Association (US), and a graduate of the Clarion South writers workshop (2005).

Cummings has won two Ditmar Awards (for HorrorScope in 2005 and 2006), and in 2015, he won the Australian Shadows Award - Paul Haines Award for Long Fiction - for his novella Dreams of Destruction. He has been nominated for more than twenty other genre awards for his writing and editing, including Spain's Premio Ignotus.

In 2007, Cummings was the Convenor of the Horror judging panel in the Aurealis Awards. He was a judge for the Australian Shadows Awards in 2007 and 2008. Cummings continued on with the Australian Shadows Award as Director in 2009 and 2010.

Shane Jiraiya Cummings served as Vice President of the Australian Horror Writers Association from 2008 to 2010 .

Cummings self-published seven e-books simultaneously in January 2011.

== Bibliography ==
=== Books ===
- Dreams of Destruction, 2014.
- The Mist Ninja, 2011.
- Requiem for the Burning God, 2011.
- The Smoke Dragon, 2011.
- Apocrypha Sequence: Deviance, 2011.
- Apocrypha Sequence: Divinity, 2011.
- Apocrypha Sequence: Inferno, 2011.
- Apocrypha Sequence: Insanity, 2011.
- Shards (e-book edition), 2011.
- Phoenix and the Darkness of Wolves, Damnation Books, 2009. ISBN 978-1-61572-055-2
- Shards: Damned and Burning (illustrated by Andrew J McKiernan), Brimstone Press, 2009
- Shards (illustrated by Andrew J McKiernan), Brimstone Press, 2009. ISBN 978-0-9805677-2-4

=== Publications Edited ===
- Rage Against the Night, Brimstone Press 2012
- HorrorScope, Brimstone Press, 2005 to 2011
- Medical Forum (Managing Editor), Health Publications, 2006 to 2009
- Midnight Echo Issue #2 (with Angela Challis), Australian Horror Writers Association, 2009
- Black: Australian Dark Culture Magazine (Managing Editor), Brimstone Press, 2008
- Black Box, Brimstone Press, 2008
- Australian Dark Fantasy & Horror 2006 edition (with Angela Challis), Brimstone Press 2006. ISBN 978-0-9802817-0-5
- Shadow Box, (with Angela Challis), Brimstone Press, Nov 2005.
- Robots & Time (with Robert N. Stephenson), Altair Australia Books, 2004. ISBN 0-9577238-4-9

== Awards ==
=== Wins ===
- 2015 Australian Shadows Award, Paul Haines Award for Long Fiction: Dreams of Destruction
- 2007 Ditmar Award, Fanzine: HorrorScope (ed. Shane Jiraiya Cummings et al.)
- 2006 Ditmar Award, Fan Writer

=== Nominations ===
- 2012 Australian Shadows Award, Best Collection: Apocrypha Sequence (all four volumes: Deviance, Divinity, Inferno, Insanity)
- 2010 Tin Duck Award, Best Professional Production: Shards (Brimstone Press)
- 2009 Premios Ignotus, Best Foreign Short Story, "The Autopsy Room" (Paura 4)
- 2009 William Atheling Jr Award: "Dark Suspense: The End of the Line" in Black: Australian Dark Culture Magazine #3
- 2009 Ditmar Award, Fanzine: HorrorScope (ed. Shane Jiraiya Cummings et al.)
- 2008 Ditmar Award, Novella/novelette: "Yamabushi Kaidan and the Smoke Dragon"
- 2008 Ditmar Award, Fan Writer
- 2008 Ditmar Award, Fanzine: HorrorScope (ed. Shane Jiraiya Cummings et al.)
- 2008 William Atheling Jr Award: Review of David Conyers' & John Sunseri's The Spiraling Worm on HorrorScope
- 2008 Aurealis Award, Young Adult short story: "Yamabushi Kaidan and the Smoke Dragon"
- 2007 Ditmar Award, Best New Talent
- 2007 Ditmar Award, Fan Writer
- 2007 Tin Duck Award, Professional Short Fiction: "Colossus of Roads" (Ticonderoga Online #9)
- 2007 Tin Duck Award, Professional Short Fiction: "Prescience" (Borderlands #8)
- 2006 Ditmar Award, Fanzine: HorrorScope (ed. Shane Jiraiya Cummings et al.)
- 2006 Ditmar Award, Fan Writer
- 2006 Australian Shadows Award: Shadow Box (with Angela Challis)
- 2006 Tin Duck Award, Professional Short Fiction: "Ian" (Ticonderoga Online #5)
- 2006 Tin Duck Award, Professional Short Fiction: "Hear No Evil" (Borderlands #4)
- 2006 Tin Duck Award, Professional Production: Shadow Box (with Angela Challis)
- 2006 Tin Duck Award, Fan Production: HorrorScope (edited by Shane Jiraiya Cummings et al.)
- 2005 Tin Duck Award, Professional Fiction: "Sobek's Tears" (Aurealis #33-35)

=== Honourable mentions ===
- 2006 Aurealis Award, Horror short story: "Revision is Murder" (Simulacrum #11)

== Reviews ==
- ASif! reviews of Cummings' work
- Tangent Online review of Australian Dark Fantasy & Horror 2006
- Tangent Online review of Shadow Box
- Ticonderoga Online review of Robots & Time
