= Martin Livings =

Australian author

- Born: 1970 (age 55–56); Western Australia
- Occupations: Writer, Information Technology
- Writing career
- Period: 1990 to present
- Genres: Horror fiction Science fiction Fantasy

Martin Livings (born 1970) is an Australian author of horror, fantasy and science fiction. He has been writing short stories since 1990 and has been nominated for both the Ditmar Award and Aurealis Award. Livings resides in Perth, Western Australia.

Livings' short fiction has appeared in the award-winning anthology Daikaiju! (Agog! Press), as well as in Borderlands, Agog! Terrific Tales (Agog! Press) and Eidolon, among many others. His work has been listed in the Year's Best Horror and Fantasy Recommended Reading, and reprinted in Year's Best Australian Science Fiction and Fantasy, Volume 2 (MirrorDanse Books, 2006), Australian Dark Fantasy and Horror, Volume 1 (Brimstone Press, 2006), and The Year's Best Australian Fantasy and Horror in 2010, 2012, 2013 and 2015 (Ticonderoga Publications).

His first novel, Carnies, was published by Lothian Books in Australia in June 2006. Carnies was nominated for an Aurealis Award and won the 2007 Tin Duck Award for Best Novel by a Western Australian. His collection of short stories, Living with the Dead, was released in 2012 by Dark Prints Press, and an original story from the collection, "Birthday Suit", won the Australian Shadows Award for Best Short Fiction that year.

== Bibliography ==
=== Novels and Books ===
- Carnies, Lothian Books, 2006
  - Carnies, Cohesion Press, 2014
  - Carnies, Self-published on Amazon, 2017
- Rope, Dark Prints Press, 2012
  - Rope, Self-published on Amazon, 2017
- The Final Twist, Self-published on Amazon, 2018
- Skinsongs, Self-published on Amazon, 2019
- An Ill Wind (2021)
- Light Falling from a Long Dead Star (2022)
- The Temp (2024)

=== Short story collections ===
- Living with the Dead, Dark Prints Press, 2012
  - Living with the Dead, Self-published on Amazon, 2017

=== Short fiction ===
- "Shifter", Aurealis issue 9, 1992
- "Ghost Card", Eidolon issue 10, 1992
- "Living With the Dead", Eidolon issue 16, 1995
- "Hunters", published on the Ticonderoga web site, 1999
- "Wrevelation", Mitch? Short Stories for Short Attention Spans, 2000
- "Sweetheart", Antipodean SF issue 35, 2001
- "Alternator", Mitch? Tarts of the New Millennium, 2001
- "Quicksilver", Mitch? Hacks to the Max, 2002
- "Halo", AustrAlien Absurdities, 2002
- "Into the Valley", Borderlands: That Which Scares Us convention book (winner of short story competition), 2002
- "The Last Laugh", Borderlands: That Which Scares Us convention book, 2002
- "The Last Dolphin", Fables and Reflections 4, 2003
- "The Proverbial", Fables and Reflections 4, 2003
- "Sigmund Freud and the Feral Freeway", Agog! Terrific Tales, 2003
- "House Call", Antipodean SF Issue 62, 2003
- "Mrs Mary Unicorn", Borderlands: Trilogies convention book, 2003
- "Know-It-All", Antipodean SF Issue 67, 2003
- "The Art of Suffering", Ticonderoga Online, 2003
- "Wood Whispers", Fables and Reflections 6, 2004
- "Tangled", Andromeda Spaceways Inflight Magazine issue 11, 2004
- "Maelstrom", Agog! Smashing Stories, 2004
- "Armageddon for Dummies", Antipodean SF Issue 75, 2004
- "I, Assassin", Shadowed Realms Issue 2, Nov/Dev 2004
- "M’Boy Cain", Ticonderoga Online Issue 3, 2005
- "Hooked", Borderlands Issue 5, 2005
- "Running", Daikaiju Anthology, 2005
- "Future Shock", Mitch? 4: Slow Dancing through Quicksand: Stories from Aussie writers who should’ve known better, 2005
- "In Nomine Patris", Shadowed Realms issue 5, May/June 2005
- "Hell Desk", Antipodean SF Issue 85, July/August 2005
- "Playtime", Shadow Box e-anthology, Halloween 2005
- "Killing Time", "Robots and Time" anthology, 2005
- "Mine", The Outcast anthology, 2006
- "Running", The Year's Best Australian SF & Fantasy, Volume Two, 2006
- "The Dark Dimension", Antipodean SF issue 100, 2006
- "Dwar7es", Ticonderoga Online, 2006
- "Hooked", Australian Dark Fantasy & Horror: 2006 edition, 2006
- "Silence", Horror Day Anthology 2006, 2006
- "There Was Darkness", Fantastic Wonder Stories, 2007
- "Tangled", Andromeda Spaceways Inflight Magazine Best of Horror, 2007
- "An Evil Twin", Antipodean SF Issue 113, 2007
- "Skin Songs", 2012, 2007
- "3:17AM", Black Box, 2007
- "Catharsis", Black Box, 2007
- "Piggies", Midnight Echo Issue 1, 2008
- "The Dead Priest’s Tale", Canterbury 2100, 2008
- "Bedbugs", Voices, 2008
- "The Velocitous and the Vexed", Hope Issue #2, 2009
- "There Was Darkness", Australian Dark Fantasy and Horror Volume 3, 2009
- "Blessed Are the Dead That the Rain Falls Upon", New Ceres Nights, 2009
  - "Blessed Are the Dead That the Rain Falls Upon", Devil Dolls and Duplicates in Australian Horror Fiction, 2011
- "Ascension", Grants Pass, 2009
- "Smiley", In Bad Dreams 2: Where Death Stalks, 2009
- "Zero Point", Antipodean SF, Issue 137, 2009
- "Silence", Midnight Echo Issue 3, 2009
- "I’m Dreaming…", Festive Fear, 2009
- "Lollo", Close Encounters of the Urban Kind, 2010
- "The Valley", Scary Kisses, 2010
- "Hearts of Ice", Blade Red Dark Pages, 2010
- "Downtown", Eclecticism Issue 13, 2010
- "Little Arkham", Worlds Next Door, 2010
- "Ascension", The Year's Best Australian SF & Fantasy, Volume 5, 2010
- "Crawling", Macabre, 2010
- "Home", Scenes from the Second Storey, 2010
- "The Last Gig of Jimmy Rucker" (with Talie Helene), More Scary Kisses, 2011
- "The Tide" (creator and co-contributor), Dead Red Heart, 2011
- "The Rider", Dead Red Heart, 2011
- "Home", Year's Best Fantasy & Horror Volume 1, 2011
- "Unwanted", Surviving the End, 2012
- "Trick Or…", Eclecticism Issue 17, 2012
- "Birthday Suit", Living with the Dead, 2012
- "You Ain’t Heard Nothin' Yet", Living With the Dead, 2012
- "The Ar-Dub", Living With the Dead, 2012
- "Art, Ink", Antipodean SF Issue 180, 2013
- "Cause and Effect", Next, 2013
- "Black Peter", Midnight Echo Issue 9, 2013
- "La Mort d’un Roturier", This is How You Die: Machine of Death 2, 2013
- "In His Name", Coins of Chaos, 2013
- "You Ain’t Heard Nothin' Yet", Year's Best Australian Fantasy and Horror 2012, 2013
- "Stillegeist", Midnight Echo Issue 10, 2013
- "Birthday Suit", Focus 2012, 2013
- "La Mort D’un Roturier", The Year's Best Australian Fantasy and Horror 2013, Late Nov 2014
- "Closer to God", Antipodean SF, issue 200, 2015
- "A Red Mist", Bloodlines, 2015
- "The Death of a Cruciverbalist", Smashwords on its own, or in Refuge Volume 1, 2015
- "Running", The Mammoth Book of Kaiju, 2016
- "In Nomine Patris", 100 Lightnings, 2016
- "Piggies", 100 Lightnings, 2016
- "Boxing Day", At The Edge, 2016
- "Stillegeist", Dead of Night, 2016
- "Tradition", Hell's Bells, 2016
- "The Circle Line", Between the Tracks, 2017
- "El Caballo Muerte", Fat Zombie, 2015
- "Closer to God", Antipodean SF, issue 200, 2015
- "La Mort D’un Roturier", The Year's Best Australian Fantasy and Horror 2015, 2017
- "Sparks", Antipodean SF, issue 250, 2019

== Awards ==
- Honorable Mention, Ellen Datlow's Year's Best Horror, 2012, "Birthday Suit", Living With the Dead, 2013
- Australian Shadows winner for Best Short Fiction, 2012, "Birthday Suit", Living With the Dead, 2013
- Australian Shadows finalist for Best Collection, 2012, N/A, Living With the Dead, 2013
- Aurealis Award nomination for Best Collection, 2012, N/A, Living With the Dead, 2013
- Tin Duck nomination for Best WA Professional Short Written Work, 2012, "Birthday Suit", Living With the Dead, 2013
- Tin Duck winner for Best WA Professional Short Written Work, 2011, "The Last Gig of Jimmy Rucker" (co-written with Talie Helene), More Scary Kisses, 2012
- Honorable Mention, Best Horror of the Year Volume One, 2008, "Piggies", Midnight Echo Issue 1, 2008
- Listed in Recommended Reading List, Horrorscope Editorial: Dark Fiction in 2008, "Skinsongs", 2012, 2008
- Listed in Recommended Reading List, Years Best Fantasy and Horror volume 21, 2008, "There Was Darkness", Fantastic Wonder Stories, 2007
- Nominated for Tin Duck, Best Short Work, 2008, "There Was Darkness", Fantastic Wonder Stories, 2007
- Nominated for Australian Shadows Award, 2008, "There Was Darkness", Fantastic Wonder Stories, 2007
- Listed in Recommended Reading List, Years Best Fantasy and Horror volume 20, 2007, "Mine", The Outcast, 2006
- Nominated for Ditmar award, Best Novel, Carnies, Lothian Books, 2006
- Tin Duck award, Best WA Professional Long Work 2007, Carnies, Lothian Books, 2006
- Runner-Up for Tin Duck award, Best WA Professional Short Work 2007, "Dwar7es", Ticonderoga Online, 38961
- Shortlisted for Aurealis Awards, Best Horror Novel, Carnies, Lothian Books, 2006
- Nominated for the AntiSF Awards 2004, "Know-It-All", Antipodean SF Issue 67, 2004
- The Year's Best Australian SF & Fantasy One, Recommended Reading List, "Wood Whispers", Fables and Reflections 6, 2004
- The Year's Best Australian SF & Fantasy One, Recommended Reading List, "The Art of Suffering", Ticonderoga Online, 38047
- The Year's Best Australian SF & Fantasy One, Recommended Reading List, "Armageddon For Dummies", Antipodean SF Issue 75, 38200
- Highly Commended Notice in KSP SF Awards, "Deadline", N/A, 2005
- Listed in Recommended Reading List, Years Best Fantasy and Horror volume 18, 2005, "Maelstrom", Agog! Smashing Stories, 2004
- Chronopolis Short Story competition 2003, "Killing Time", N/A, 2003
- Shortlisted for Aurealis Awards, Best SF Short Story, "Sigmund Freud and the Feral Freeway", Agog! Terrific Tales, 2003
- Shortlisted for Ditmar Awards, Best Novella, "Sigmund Freud and the Feral Freeway", Agog! Terrific Tales, 2003
- Shortlisted for Tin Duck Awards, Best Short Story, "Sigmund Freud and the Feral Freeway", Agog! Terrific Tales, 2003
- Borderlands: That Which Scares Us short story competition winner, "Into the Valley", Borderlands: That Which Scares Us convention book, 2002
- Winner, Tin Duck Award, Best Short Story, "Living with the Dead", Eidolon issue 16, 1995
- Listed in Recommended Reading List, Years Best Fantasy and Horror 1993, "Ghost Card", Eidolon issue 10, 1992
