= Australasian Horror Writers Association =

Non-profit Organisation

The Australasian Horror Writers Association (AHWA) is a non-profit organisation founded in 2003 as the Australian Horror Writers Association with the goal of providing a unified voice and sense of community for Australian writers of dark fiction (horror and dark fantasy) and to further the development of dark fiction in Australia. The AHWA has in more recent times changed its name to The Australasian Horror Writers Association and is currently (2025) active. It conducts the Shadows Awards for horror writing.

== History ==
The AHWA built to some extent on the work of previous horror writers' associations in Australia such as the Sydney-based Gargoyle Club (1987–92)(see Leigh Blackmore) and the Melbourne-based Australian Horror Writers (1994-1998) (see Bryce J. Stevens), which grew out of Bloodsongs magazine (its president being Bryce J. Stevens, and its newsletter/journal Severed Head having been edited first by Stevens, then Aaron Sterns). However, the AHWA was a far more ambitious effort, conceived by its founding committee as drawing together horror writers and fans nationwide in Australia.

The AHWA was officially launched during the Continuum 3 science fiction convention in Melbourne on 17 July 2005 by author Richard Harland.

The founding committee members were Dr Marty Young (President), Kirstyn McDermott (Vice President), Mick Piemontese (Secretary), Carl Schaller (Treasurer), James R Cain and Angela Challis.

In 2005, the AHWA established the Australian Shadows Award as an annual literary award to honour the best published work of horror fiction written or edited by an Australian. The award was sponsored by Altair Australia Books in its first two years, through the donation of two statuettes created by dark fantasy artist Brom (supplied by The Franklin Mint).

Other projects established by the AHWA include the Southern Horror Yahoo! Group mailing list for members, an annual flash fiction and short story competition (winning entries are published in Midnight Echo magazine), online chatrooms and forums, a Market Hive (markets database for current horror fiction markets), an annual mentorship programme, and ongoing story critiquing groups.

Renowned Australian horror & ghost story anthologist James Doig has provided the AHWA website with a historical checklist of important Australian horror and fantasy works.

The AHWA also maintains links with the British Fantasy Society and Horror Writers of America.

The AHWA news service was amalgamated with Brimstone Press's news and review webzine HorrorScope between March 2007 and Sept 2010. With AHWA news editor Talie Helene joining the HorrorScope editorial team, the combined serviced provided a single, streamlined source for Australian horror publishing news until early 2011.

== Midnight Echo magazine ==
AHWA produces a regular print publication Midnight Echo (Oct 2008 - ). It is designed to showcase the best in Australian horror writing, though it also publishes work by non-Australian writers. The magazine began as a PDF publication with limited hardcopies being printed outside Australia. As from Issue 5, the hardcopy magazine is printed in Australia by Black House Comics.

The Executive Editor of Midnight Echo Issues 1-5 was Australian author Scott Wilson. Leigh Blackmore became Acting Executive Editor with Issue 5. Previous President Dr Marty Young returned to the AHWA as Executive Editor for Midnight Echo in Sept 2011 in time for the release of Issue 6. Marty Young launched the new Midnight Echo website in Oct 2011.

Each issue is edited by a different editor or editorial team drawn from AHWA's membership. The Art Director for Issues 1-3 was David Schembri. On Issue 5 the Art team consisted of Juliet Bathory and David Schembri. Issue 5 was the first issue printed entirely in Australia.

Colour cover artwork has featured on all issues from Issue 1 onwards. Issues 1 and 2 contained no poetry or colour internal artwork. Poetry was featured prominently alongside fiction in Issue 3, which was also the first issue to include a graphic novel (in black and white).

Individual issues of Midnight Echo have been edited by

- Kirstyn McDermott and Ian Mond (Issue 1, Oct 2008))
- Angela Challis and Shane Jiraiya Cummings (Issue 2 (June 2009))
- Stephen Studach (see The Australian Horror and Fantasy Magazine) (Issue 3 (Nov 2009))
- Lee Battersby (Issue 4 (July 2010)
- Leigh Blackmore (Issue 5, Feb 2011).
- David Conyers, Jason Fischer and David Kernot (Issue 6, Nov 2011)
- Daniel I Russell (Issue 7, May 2012)
- Marty Young, Mark Farrugia, and Amanda J Spedding (Issue 8, November 2012)
- GN Braun AKA Geoff Brown (Issue 9, May 2013)

== AHWA officeholders ==
In Sept 2010 all committee positions of the AHWA were declared vacant and new officeholders were elected. Leigh Blackmore replaced Dr Marty Young as the organisation's second President and served in that role for the year 2010–2011. Horrorscope also ceased to be amalgamated with the AHWA.

At the Oct 2011 AGM of the Association, writer Geoff Brown was elected as the AHWA's third President.
