= Kate Richards =

Australian writer, doctor and medical researcher

Kate Richards is an Australian writer, doctor and medical researcher. She writes and speaks about her experiences with mental illness, and is the author of two books on the subject.

== Early life and education ==
Richards is a graduate of RMIT University in Melbourne, and Monash University, where she trained as a doctor while battling mental illness in the form of severe depression.

== Career ==
After battling depression for fifteen years, including periods of self-harm and attempted suicide, Richards wrote a detailed account of her personal experiences, both with the illness itself and with the many psychiatrists and other health professionals who treated her. The book, titled Madness: A Memoir, was published by Penguin Books in 2013, and has been widely discussed and positively reviewed by both the literary and the medical communities. In 2014 the book won the $5000 Dobbie Literary Award for a first book by an Australian female writer and the Adelaide Festival Award for Literature (non-fiction).

In 2014, Richards' second book. Is There No Place For Me? Making Sense of Madness was published by Penguin Books. This book was shortlisted for the Government of Australia Human Rights Non-Fiction Literature Award.

In 2019 her first novel, Fusion, was published by Penguin Books. It was shortlisted for Best Novel at the 2019 Australian Shadow Awards.

Richards works as a medical researcher, and also writes and lectures about the writing process and about her experiences with mental illness.

== Works ==
- Madness: A Memoir, Penguin Books, 2014
- Is There No Place For Me? Making Sense of Madness, Penguin Books, 2014
- Wild Minds: Writing from the Heart of Madness, Alternativas, 2018
- Fusion, Penguin Books, 2019
