= Alan Baxter (author) =

British-Australian author

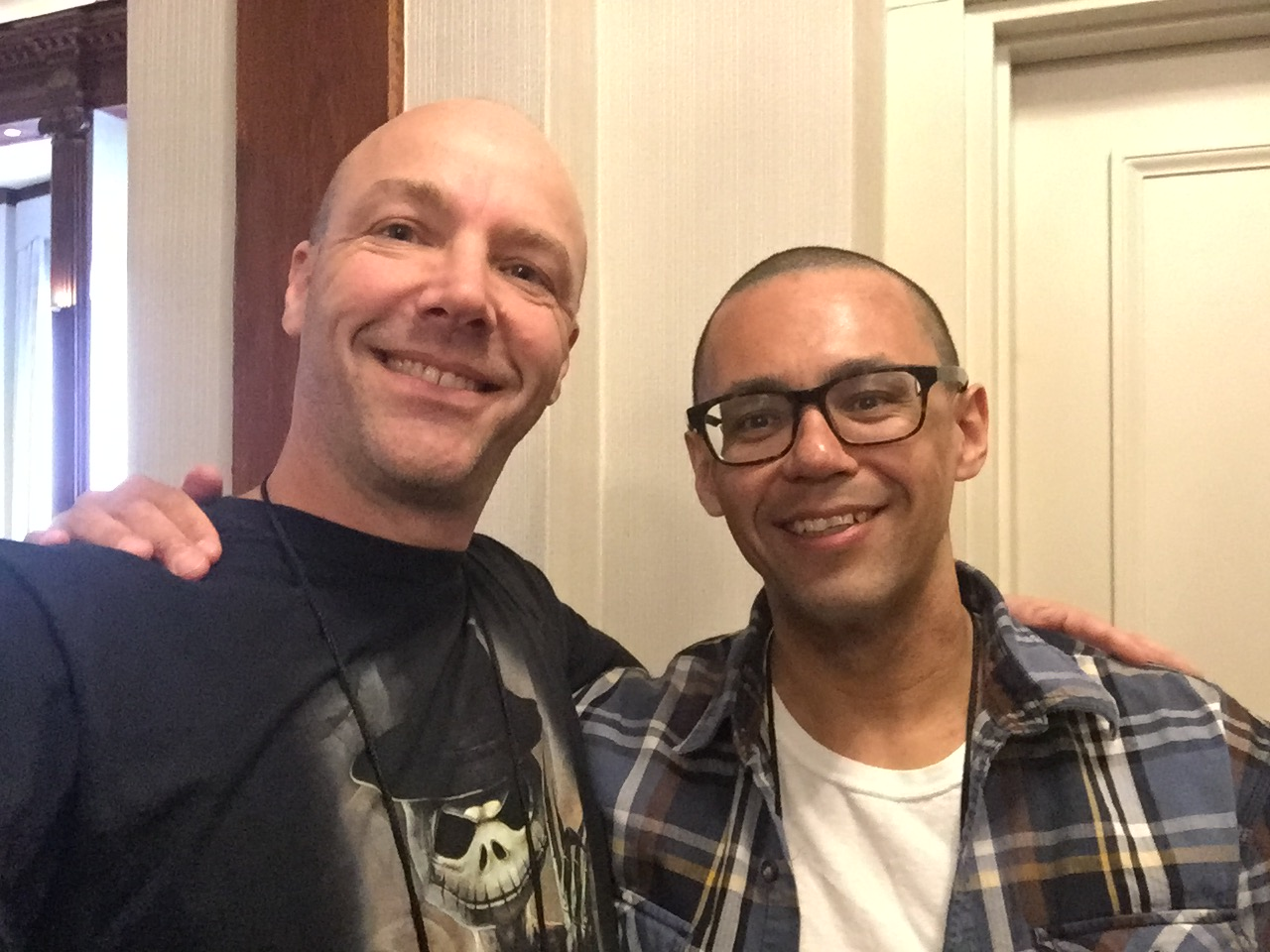
- Alan Baxter (left) with American writer, Victor LaValle, at StokerCon, Providence, RI in March 2018
- Born: 18 April 1970; Sussex, United Kingdom
- Occupations: Writer, martial artist, personal trainer
- Writing career
- Notable works: Sallow Bend; The Alex Caine Series; The Gulp; The Roo

Alan Richard Baxter (born 18 April 1970, Sussex, United Kingdom) is a British-Australian author of supernatural thrillers, horror and dark fantasy, and a teacher and practitioner of kung fu and qi gong.

He has published several novels, novellas, collections, and over 100 short stories. He has also co-written several novels with American action-adventure author, David Wood. He has won four Australian Shadows Awards and one Aurealis Award.

== Early life and influences ==
Baxter was born in 1970 in Crawley, Sussex, UK. At the age of 7, his family moved to Surrey where Baxter remained until emigrating to Australia permanently in 1999 after 2 years of world travel. His earliest writing was an infamous short story in school, aged 7.

His interest in speculative and genre fiction persisted from childhood into adulthood. He maintains that everyone reads speculative fiction as children, but at some point some people choose to stop. Drawn especially to dark fiction and horror, Baxter cites among his influences people such as Clive Barker, H P Lovecraft, Shirley Jackson, Kaaron Warren, and Stephen King. Baxter has also cited comic books as being big influences on his work, in particular work like Garth Ennis's "Hellblazer" and Neil Gaiman's "Sandman". Baxter's dark urban horror thrillers often feature realistic violence, often gleaned from first-hand experience, the author having spent a lifetime training and teaching martial arts. Baxter has often expressed his love of mashing genres and writing across formats. His work regularly addresses themes of death and mortality, and the justices and injustices in life.

== Personal life ==
Aside from writing, the other main professional focus of Baxter's life has been martial arts. He says that running up against bullies in school drove him towards competitive martial arts in his childhood, and that he found a lifelong path there. After studying a variety of arts, he is now a practitioner and teacher of Choy Lee Fut Kung Fu, and is an international master and Fire Dragon Disciple of Grandmaster Chen Yong Fa. Baxter has competed in a number of competitions in the UK, Australia, and China. In 1996 he won the British Wutan Federation National Championship title in the UK.

Baxter is married to Glover Prize-winning Australian artist, Halinka Orszulok.

== Awards ==
Baxter's writing accolades include being a thirteen-time finalist in the Aurealis Awards, an eight-time finalist in the Australian Shadows Awards and a fourteen-time finalist in the Ditmar Awards. He won the 2014 Australian Shadows Award for Best Short Story ("Shadows of the Lonely Dead"), the 2015 Australian Shadows Paul Haines Award For Long Fiction ("In Vaulted Halls Entombed"), the 2016 Australian Shadows Award for Best Collection (Crow Shine), and the 2019 Australian Shadows Award for Best Collection (Served Cold). He is also a past winner of the AHWA Short Story Competition ("It's Always the Children Who Suffer"). Alan's work has made the Preliminary Ballot for the Bram Stoker Awards three times (Crow Shine, 2016 Bram Stoker Award (TM) for Superior Achievement in a Fiction Collection, The Gulp 2021 Bram Stoker Award (TM) for Superior Achievement in a Fiction Collection, and Sallow Bend 2022 Bram Stoker Award for Superior Achievement in a Novel).

Alan's 2015 Australian Shadows Paul Haines Award-winning story, "In Vaulted Halls Entombed", was adapted for Season 3 of the Netflix Original Series, Love, Death & Robots.

From November 2020 to November 2023, Baxter was President of the Australasian Horror Writers Association. He's also a Full Active Member of the US-based Horror Writer's Association.

- THE LEAVES FORGET – a supernatural mystery novella (Absinthe Books, September 2023) – Finalist for the 2023 Aurealis Award for Best Horror Novella; Finalist for the 2023 Aurealis Award for Best Fantasy Novella
- "All the Eyes That See" – Cosmic Horror Monthly issue #42, ed. Charles Tyra (December 2023) Finalist for the 2023 Australian Shadows Award for Short Fiction
- SALLOW BEND – Finalist for the 2022 Aurealis Award for Best Horror Novel; Finalist for the 2022 Ditmar Award for Best Novel
- DAMNATION GAMES – Finalist for the 2022 Ditmar Award for Best Horror Collected Work
- THE FALL: Tales From The Gulp 2 – Finalist for the 2022 Aurealis Award for Best Collection; Finalist for the 2022 Ditmar Award for Best Horror Collected Work
- "Gulpepper Curios" – 2022 Ditmar Award finalist for Best Novella
- THE GULP: Tales From The Gulp 1 – Australian cosmic horror novella collection/mosaic novel (Self-published, January 2021) – Winner of the 2021 Aurealis Award for Best Collection; preliminary ballot for the 2021 Bram Stoker Award (TM) for Best Collection; 2021 Ditmar Awards Finalist for Best Collected Work
- "The Band Plays On" (from The Gulp) – 2021 Aurealis Awards Finalist for Best Horror Novella
- "Mother in Bloom" (from The Gulp) – 2021 Aurealis Awards Finalist for Best Fantasy Novella
- GHOST RECALL: Eli Carver 3 – Finalist for the 2021 Ditmar Award for Best Novella
- THE ROO – Finalist for the 2020 Ditmar Award for Best Novella
- SERVED COLD – (Grey Matter Press, ed. Anthony Rivera, September 2019) – Winner of the 2019 Australian Shadows Award for Best Collected Work.
- "The Ocean Hushed The Stones" – Served Cold (Grey Matter Press, September 2019) – Finalist for the 2019 Australian Shadows Award for Best Short Story.
- "Yellowheart" – Served Cold (Grey Matter Press, September 2019) – Finalist for the 2019 Aurealis Award for Best Horror Novella.
- DEVOURING DARK – (Grey Matter Press, 2018) Finalist for the 2018 Australian Shadows Award for Best Novel.
- DEVOURING DARK – (Grey Matter Press, 2018) Finalist for the 2018 Ditmar Award for Best Novel.
- DEVOURING DARK – (Grey Matter Press, 2018) Finalist for the 2018 Aurealis Award for Best Fantasy Novel.
- "Crying Demon" – Suspended In Dusk 2 (ed. Simon Dewar, Grey Matter Press, August 2018). Finalist for the 2018 Aurealis Award for Best Fantasy Short Story.
- The Book Club – (PS Publishing, May 2017) – Finalist for the 2017 Aurealis Award for Best Fantasy Novella.
- Crow Shine – (Ticonderoga Publications, September 2016) – Winner of the 2016 Australian Shadows Award for Best Collected Work; Finalist for the 2016 Aurealis Award for Best Collection, Finalist for the 2016 Ditmar Award for Best Collected Work.
- "Served Cold" – Dreaming in the Dark anthology (ed. Jack Dann, PS Publishing, December 2016) – Finalist for the 2016 Aurealis Award for Best Horror Novella]; Finalist for the 2016 Australian Shadows Paul Haines Award for Long Fiction.
- "Raven's First Flight" – SNAFU: Black Ops anthology (ed. Geoff Brown & A J Spedding, Cohesion Press, September 2016) – Finalist for the 2016 Aurealis Award for Best Fantasy Novella.
- "In Vaulted Halls Entombed" – SNAFU: Survival of the Fittest anthology (ed. Geoff Brown & A J Spedding, Cohesion Press, September 2015) Winner Australian Shadows Paul Haines Award for Long Fiction 2015 – Novelette
- "The Chart of the Vagrant Mariner" nominated for the 2015 Ditmar Award for Best Short Story; included on the Tangent Online 2015 Recommended Reading List; reprinted in Year's Best Australian Fantasy & Horror 2015 (Ticonderoga Publications); included on Ellen Datlow's Honorable Mentions Long List for The Best Horror of the Year, Volume 8.
- "Shadows of the Lonely Dead" (Suspended In Dusk anthology, Books of the Dead Press, ed. Simon Dewar) Winner of the 2014 Australian Shadows Award for Best Short Story
- "Mephisto" finalist in the 2014 Australian Shadows Awards for Best Short Story
- "Obsidian: Alex Caine #2" finalist for the 2014 Aurealis Award for Best Horror Novel
- "Bound: Alex Caine #1" finalist for the 2014 Ditmar Award for Best Novel
- "The Darkness in Clara" finalist for 2014 Ditmar Award for Best Novelette or Novella; included on Ellen Datlow's Best Horror of the Year Vol. 7 Recommended Reading Long List; included on Recommended Reading List, Year's Best Dark Fantasy & Horror 2014, ed. Liz Grzyb & Talie Helene, Ticonderoga Publications
- "Not the Worst of Sins" finalist for Best Short Story Ditmar Award, 2013
- "It's Always the Children Who Suffer" – Joint winner of the 2013 AHWA Short Story Competition
- Nominated for a Ditmar Award – Best New Talent, 2011

== Bibliography ==
=== Novels ===
- 2024: Blood Covenant (Cemetery Dance Publications)
- 2022: Sallow Bend (Cemetery Dance Publications)
- 2018: Devouring Dark (Grey Matter Press)
- 2018: Hidden City (Gryphonwood Press)
- 2014: Abduction – Alex Caine Book 3 (HarperVoyager)
- 2014: Obsidian – Alex Caine Book 2 (HarperVoyager)
- 2014: Bound – Alex Caine Book 1 (HarperVoyager)
- 2010: MageSign – The Balance Book 1 (Gryphonwood Press
- 2010: RealmShift – The Balance Book 2 (Gryphonwood Press)

=== Novels (Co-Authored with David Wood) ===
- 2020: Sanctum – Jake Crowley Adventures Book 0 (Adrenaline Press)
- 2019: Crocalypse – Sam Aston Investigations Book 3 (Adrenaline Press)
- 2019: Revenant – Jake Crowley Adventures Book 3 (Adrenaline Press)
- 2018: Overlord – Sam Aston Investigations Book 2 (Adrenaline Press)
- 2017: Primordial – Sam Aston Investigations Book 1 (Adrenaline Press)
- 2017: Anusbis Key – Jake Crowley Adventures Book 2 (Adrenaline Press)
- 2016: Blood Codex – Jake Crowley Adventures Book 1 (Adrenaline Press)
- 2013: Dark Rite (Gryphonwood Press)

=== Collections ===
- 2021: The Fall: Tales From The Gulp 2 (self-published)
- 2020: The Gulp: Tales From The Gulp #1 (self-published)
- 2019: Served Cold (Grey Matter Press)
- 2016: Crow Shine (Ticonderoga Publications)

=== Novellas ===
- 2023: The Leaves Forget (Absinthe Books)
- 2021: Ghost Recall (Grey Matter Press)
- 2020: The Roo (self-published)
- 2020: Recall Night (Grey Matter Press)
- 2018: Manifest Recall (Grey Matter Press)
- 2017: The Book Club (PS Publishing)
- 2010: Ghost of the Black (self-published)

=== Short stories ===
- A full bibliography of Baxter's work can be found on his website.
