= Jay Caselberg =

Australian science fiction writer

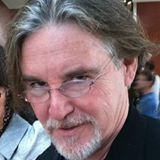
- Caselberg at the World Science Fiction Convention 2012 in Chicago, Illinois
- Born: Australia
- Education: University of Wollongong
- Occupation: novelist
- Writing career
- Pen name: James A. Hartley, Jackson Creed, J.A. Caselberg
- Period: 1996–present
- Genres: Science fiction, horror, fantasy, literary
- Website: www.caselberg.net

Jay Caselberg (born 1958) is an Australian science fiction writer. He has also used the name 'James Hartley' for some of his short fiction. His four novels to date are the Jack Stein series, comprising Wyrmhole, Metal Sky, The Star Tablet and Wall of Mirrors, published 2003–2006 by Roc Books. Subsequent works appeared mostly in the small press, comprising "Empties", "The Jackal Dreaming" as J.A Caselberg, "The Memory Box" and "Breath" as Jackson Creed.
