= Jeremy Bates (author) =

Canadian-Australian author (born 1978)

- Born: July 8, 1978 (age 48); Toronto, Ontario, Canada
- Education: University of Western Ontario; Charles Darwin University
- Occupations: Novelist, short story writer
- Writing career
- Genres: horror, suspense, thrillers, science fiction
- Website: www.jeremybatesbooks.com

Jeremy Bates (born July 8, 1978) is a Canadian/Australian author. He writes suspense and horror fiction, which typically explores the darker side of human nature. His work is rich in atmosphere and sensory details. The novels in his "World's Scariest Places" series are all set in real locations, such as Aokigahara in Japan, The Catacombs in Paris, Helltown in Ohio, and Island of the Dolls in Mexico. They have been translated into several languages including Russian, Czech, and German among others.

== Biography ==
Bates was born in Toronto. He attended St. Michael's College School, a private, all boys Roman Catholic high school, and The University of Western Ontario in London, Ontario, where he earned a Bachelor of Arts in English Literature and Philosophy. He also holds a graduate teaching diploma from Charles Darwin University in Darwin, Australia. Bates currently lives on the Gold Coast, Australia.

== Novels and short story collections ==
- White Lies (Oceanview Publishing, 2012)
- The Taste of Fear (Ghillinnein Books, 2012)
- Suicide Forest (Ghillinnein Books, 2014)
- Black Canyon (Ghillinnein Books, 2015)
- The Catacombs (Ghillinnein Books, 2015)
- Run (Ghillinnein Books, 2015)
- Helltown (Ghillinnein Books, 2015)
- Rewind (Ghillinnein Books, 2015)
- Neighbors (Ghillinnein Books, 2015)
- Dark Hearts (Ghillinnein Books, 2015)
- New America: Utopia Calling (Ghillinnein Books, 2015)
- Six Bullets (Ghillinnein Books, 2016)
- Island of the Dolls (Ghillinnein Books, 2016)
- Box of Bones (Ghillinnein Books, 2016)
- The Mailman (Ghillinnein Books, 2017)
- Re-Roll (Ghillinnein Books, 2018)
- Mountain of the Dead (Ghillinnein Books, 2018)
- Mosquito Man (Ghillinnein Books, 2019)
- The Man from Taured (Ghillinnein Books, 2019)
- The Sleep Experiment (Ghillinnein Books, 2019)
- The No-End House (Kensington, 2025)

== Nominations, awards and contests ==
- Winner, "Reader Views Literary Awards" Horror Novel Award, 2018-2019, for Mountain of the Dead
- Finalist, "Aurealis Award for Excellence in Speculative Fiction" Horror Novella Award, 2017, for The Mailman
- Finalist, "Australian Horror Writers Association" Shadows Award, 2017, for The Mailman
- Winner, "Foreword INDIES" Horror Book of the Year Award Gold Medal, 2016, for Island of the Dolls
- Finalist, "Next Generation Indie Book Awards" Horror Novel Award, 2017, for Island of the Dolls
- Finalist, "Aurealis Award for Excellence in Speculative Fiction" Horror Novella Award, 2016, for Box of Bones
- Finalist, "Australian Horror Writers Association" Shadows Award, 2016, for Box of Bones
- Winner, "Crime Writers of Canada" Arthur Ellis Award/The Lou Allen Memorial Award, 2016, for Black Canyon
- Winner, "Australian Horror Writers Association" Shadows Award, 2015, for The Catacombs
- Winner, "IPPY (Independent Publisher Book Awards)" Bronze Medal/Horror, 2016, for The Catacombs
- Finalist, "Next Generation Indie Book Awards" Horror Novella Award, 2016, for Black Canyon
- Winner, "Reader Views Literary Award" Global Award, 2014-2015, for Suicide Forest
- Honorable Mention, "Reader Views Literary Award" Mystery/Thriller/Suspense/Horror Award, 2014-2015, for Suicide Forest
- Finalist, "Goodreads" Choice Awards 2015, for Suicide Forest
- Finalist, "Australian Horror Writers Association" Shadows Award, 2014, for Suicide Forest
- Finalist, "Foreword INDIES" Horror Book of the Year Award, 2014, for Suicide Forest
- Finalist, "Foreword INDIES" Thriller & Suspense Book of the Year Award, 2012, for White Lies
