= Brimstone Press =

Brimstone Press was an Australian independent publisher of dark fiction (horror and dark fantasy). Brimstone Press was established in 2004 by Shane Jiraiya Cummings and was based in Western Australia.

The first publication from Brimstone Press was Shadowed Realms, an online flash fiction horror magazine that was active from 2004 to 2007. Authors published in Shadowed Realms include Terry Dowling, Richard Harland, Robert Hood, Poppy Z Brite, Stephen Dedman, Kurt Newton, Martin Livings, Lee Battersby, Paul Haines, Steven Cavanagh and Kaaron Warren. Shadowed Realms gained professional status from the Science Fiction and Fantasy Writers of America (SFWA) in 2005 and was nominated for the Best Collected Work Ditmar Award in 2006.

Brimstone Press also published HorrorScope: The Australian Dark Fiction Web Log, a news and review webzine. In December 2006, Brimstone Press moved into book publication. Among their published anthologies are Shadow Box and the Australian Dark Fantasy & Horror series.

Brimstone Press produced a newsstand-quality horror magazine, Black: Australia's Dark Culture magazine which ran for three issues in 2008. Many of Australia's best-known horror writers including Rob Hood, Leigh Blackmore and others appeared in its pages.

Several stories and projects published by Brimstone Press have won, or been nominated for, Australian and international literary awards.

== Publications ==
- Shadowed Realms online magazine, ed. Angela Challis (2004 to 2007). ISSN 1832-0651
- HorrorScope: The Australian Dark Fiction Web Log, ed. Shane Jiraiya Cummings et al. (2005 to present).
- Shadow Box, ed. Angela Challis & Shane Jiraiya Cummings (2005).
- Australian Dark Fantasy & Horror 2006 edition, ed. Angela Challis & Shane Jiraiya Cummings (2006). ISBN 978-0-9802817-0-5
- Book of Shadows Volume One, ed. Angela Challis (2006) ISBN 978-0-9802817-1-2
- Australian Dark Fantasy & Horror 2007 edition, ed. Angela Challis (December 2007) ISBN 978-0-9802817-2-9
- Black Box, ed. Shane Jiraiya Cummings (March 2008).

== Awards ==
=== Wins ===
- 2007 Ditmar Award, Fanzine: HorrorScope (ed. Shane Jiraiya Cummings et al.)
- 2006 Aurealis Award, Horror short story: "Pater Familias" by Lee Battersby (Shadowed Realms #3)

=== Nominations ===
- 2010 Bram Stoker Award, Anthology: Macabre: A Journey through Australia's Darkest Fears (edited by Angela Challis and Marty Young)
- 2010 Bram Stoker Award, Long Fiction: "Monsters Among Us" by Kirstyn McDermott (Macabre)
- 2010 Australian Shadows Award, Edited Publication: Macabre: A Journey through Australia's Darkest Fears (edited by Angela Challis and Marty Young)
- 2010 Australian Shadows Award, Short Fiction: "All The Clowns In Clowntown" by Andrew J. McKiernan (Macabre)
- 2008 Ditmar Award, Fanzine: HorrorScope (ed. Shane Jiraiya Cummings et al.)
- 2008 William Atheling Jr Award: "The Spiraling Worm review" by Shane Jiraiya Cummings (HorrorScope)
- 2007 Ditmar Award, Short Story: "Surrender 1: Rope Artist" by Deborah Biancotti (Shadowed Realms #9)
- 2007 Ditmar Award, Short Story: "Cold" by Kirstyn McDermott (Shadowed Realms #9)
- 2007 Ditmar Award, Short Story: "The Bat's Boudoir" by Kyla Ward (Shadowed Realms #9)
- 2007 Ditmar Award, Professional Achievement: Angela Challis (for Brimstone Press)
- 2007 William Atheling Jr Award: "Paraspheres review" by Miranda Siemienowicz (HorrorScope)
- 2006 Ditmar Award, Collected work: Shadowed Realms (ed. Angela Challis)
- 2006 Ditmar Award, Fanzine: HorrorScope (ed. Shane Jiraiya Cummings et al.)
- 2006 Australian Shadows Award: Shadow Box (ed. Angela Challis & Shane Jiraiya Cummings)
- 2006 Australian Shadows Award: "Pater Familias" by Lee Battersby (Shadowed Realms #3)

== Reviews ==
- ASif! reviews of Shadowed Realms issues
- ASif! reviews of Brimstone Press anthologies
- Tangent Online review of Australian Dark Fantasy & Horror 2006
- Tangent Online review of Shadow Box
- Tangent Online reviews of Shadowed Realms issues
- Whispers of Wickedness review of Book of Shadows
