= Jason Fischer (writer) =

Australian writer

- Born: Australia
- Occupations: Writer, novelist
- Writing career
- Genre: Speculative fiction
- Notable awards: Aurealis Award; Best Fantasy Novella; 2015 Defy the Grey Kings Writers of the Future; Writers of the Future; 2009 The House of Nameless
- Website: jasonfischer.com.au

Jason Fischer is a speculative fiction writer from South Australia. He is predominantly recognised as a writer in the science fiction, fantasy and horror genres.

== Works ==
Fischer's stories have appeared in a number of publications including Beneath Ceaseless Skies, On Spec, Review of Australian Fiction, Aurealis and Andromeda Spaceways Inflight Magazine. His stories have been included in many year's best anthologies, particularly in The Year's Best Australian Fantasy and Horror, which ran for years in the early 2010s; the books were edited by Liz Grzyb and Talie Helene. Titles included "The School Bus", "Hunting Rufus", and "Pigroot Flat". Also, "For Want of a Jesusman" was reprinted in The Year's Best Australian Science Fiction and Fantasy: Volume 5, edited by Bill Congreve.

His zombie apocalypse novel Quiver was published in 2012 by Black House Comics, and his first short story collection Everything Is a Graveyard was published by Ticonderoga Publications in 2013.

== Awards ==
Fischer won the inaugural 2015 Aurealis Award for Best Fantasy Novella, and was 1st Place Winner for Writers of the Future, 2nd Quarter 2009. He has been nominated for the Ditmar Award several times.

== Bibliography ==
=== Books of Before & Now ===
1. Papa Lucy & the Boneman (2021)
2. The Jawbone & the Junkman (2023)

=== The Tamsyn Webb Chronicles ===
1. Quiver (2012)
2. Go to Hell (2021)

=== Chapbooks ===
- After the World: Gravesend (2009)

=== Collections ===
- Everything Is a Graveyard (2013)

=== Notable short fiction ===
- Jesusman
  - "For Want of a Jesusman" (2009)
  - "Gunning for a Tinkerman" (2010)

==== Standalone ====
- "Plebiscite AV3X" (2008)
- "Undead Camels Ate Their Flesh" (2008)
- "A Bride Beyond the Gate" (2008)
- "Rick Gets a Job" (2008)
- "The Patchwork Palace" (2009)
- "A Rose for Becca" (2009)
- "The Imogen Effect" (2009)
- "Houndkin" (2009)
- "Busking" (2009)
- "Starship Zamedi" (2009)
- "The School Bus" (2010)
- "Sebastian" (2010)
- "The House of Nameless" (2010)
- "Goodnights to Heaven" (2010)
- "Goggy" (2011)
- "Hunting Rufus" (2011)
- "Eating Gnashdal" (2011)
- "Rolling for Fetch" (2012)
- "Pigroot Flat" (2012)
- "The Ward of Hours" (2012)
- "Art, Ink" (2013) with Martin Livings
- "Everything Is a Graveyard" (2013)
- "L'Hombre" (2013)
- "When the Cheerful Misogynist Came to True Town" (2013)
- "The Glorious Aerybeth" (2014)
- "Strange Encounters" (2014)
- "Percy's War" (2014)
- "The Dog Pit" (2015)
- "Defy the Grey Kings" (2015)
- "By the Laws of Crab and Woman" (2016)
- "Ladyflies" (2016)
- "Milk and Honey" (2017)
- "Riding the Snails" (2019)
- "Posse Comitatus" (2019)
- "Mutata Superesse" (2019) with Sean Williams
- "Of Meat and Man" (2019)
- "Brother Bound" (2022)
- "A City Beneath (and How to Hide from It)" (2023) with Martin Livings
