= Ticonderoga Publications =

Australian independent publisher

- Status: active
- Founded: 1996
- Founder: Russell B. Farr
- Country of origin: Australia
- Headquarters location: Greenwood, Western Australia
- Fiction genres: Speculative fiction
- Official website: ticonderogapublications.com

Ticonderoga Publications is an Australian independent publishing house founded by Russell B. Farr in 1996, which specializes in science fiction, fantasy, and horror short stories. Farr now runs the publisher alongside Liz Grzyb, an editor.

== History and current ==
The publisher initially specialized in collections of science fiction short stories. Between 1996 and 1999, it published collections by Steven Utley, Sean Williams, Stephen Dedman, and other writers. According to Ben Peek, "Under Farr, Ticonderoga Publications gathered a reputation for producing sturdy, thick-papered, elegant collections."

Ticonderoga Publications suspended their production of books in 1999 due to the Australian GST (Goods and Services Tax) that raised the price of books by ten percent, with the editor concentrating on his Ticonderoga Online webzine instead.

In 2005, they resumed publication with two new anthologies in late 2006-early 2007. In 2006, it published Troy, a collection by Simon Brown. In 2007, it published the Ditmar Award-winning Fantastic Wonder Stories, edited by Russell B. Farr.

Ticonderoga Publications has published several anthologies, including The Workers' Paradise (2007) edited by Russell B. Farr and Nick Evans, Australia's first SF anthology to explore the future of work; Scary Kisses (2010) edited by Liz Grzyb, Australia's first paranormal romance anthology; Belong (2010) edited by Russell B. Farr, twenty-three stories of interstellar immigration with writers from Australia, Bulgaria, Canada, USA, UK, and New Zealand; and Dead Red Heart (2011) edited by Russell B. Farr, thirty-three Australian vampire stories.

In 2008 it published Magic Dirt: the best of Sean Williams, winner of the inaugural Aurealis Award for Best Collection.

Russell Farr's co-partner is editor Liz Grzyb. From 2010 to 2015, they published The Year's Best Australian Fantasy and Horror series, edited by Grzyb and Talie Helene.

The West Australian newspaper has described Ticonderoga Publications as one of "the most important micro presses in Australia".

== Authors ==
=== Published ===
- Howard Waldrop
- Steven Utley
- Simon Brown
- Sean Williams
- Stephen Dedman
- Lewis Shiner
- Terry Dowling
- Kim Wilkins
- Kaaron Warren
- Angela Slatter
- Justina Robson
- Lucy Sussex
- Lisa L. Hannett
- Sara Douglass
- Felicity Dowker
- Greg Mellor
- Juliet Marillier
- Cat Sparks
- Glenda Larke
- Jason Fischer
- Patty Jansen
- Janeen Webb
- Ian McHugh
- R. J. Ashby
- Christine Daigle
- Stewart Sternberg
- Anna Tambour
- Alan Baxter
