= Felicity Dowker =

Australian writer

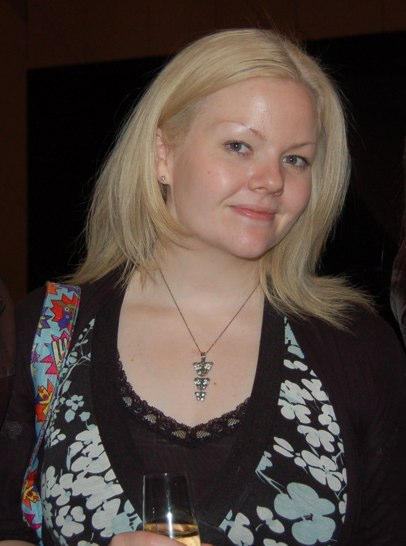
- Felicity Dowker in 2010.
- Born: 1980 (age 45–46); Australia
- Writing career
- Genre: Speculative fiction
- Notable works: "Bread and Circuses", "Jesse's Gift"
- Notable awards: Ditmar Award; 2009
- Website: felicitydowker.livejournal.com

Felicity Dowker is a speculative fiction writer from Victoria, Australia. She is predominantly recognised as a writer in the horror genre.

In 2009, she won the Ditmar Award (Australian SF Award) for Best New Talent. Her story "Jesse's Gift" was nominated for the Aurealis Award for Horror Short Story.

Dowker's stories have appeared in a number of Australian publications including Borderlands, Aurealis and Andromeda Spaceways Inflight Magazine. One story in particular, "Bread and Circuses", was the recipient of positive reviews after appearing in the Scary Kisses anthology, and was described in Scoop magazine as one of the highlights of the collection.

Her story, "Bread and Circuses" is a finalist for the 2010 Ditmar Award for Short Fiction as well as the 2010 Australian Shadows Award for Short Fiction.

Dowker's first story collection, Bread and Circuses, was published in 2012.
