= Kirstyn McDermott =

Australian writer

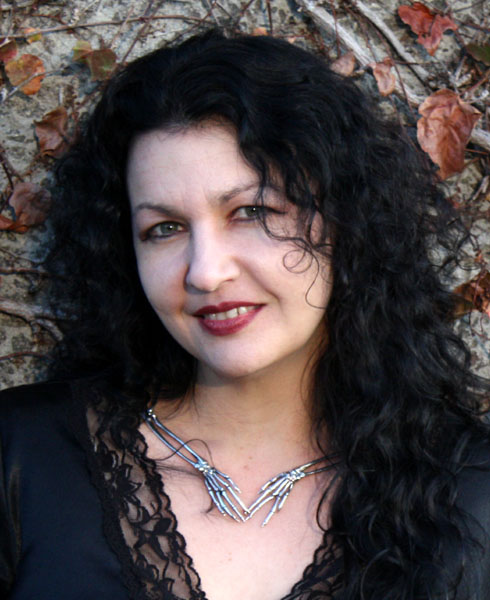
- Born: Newcastle, New South Wales, Australia
- Occupation: Writer
- Spouse: Jason Nahrung
- Writing career
- Period: 1993–present
- Genre: Speculative fiction
- Notable awards: 2020 Convenors' Award for excellence (Aurealis Award)
- Website: kirstynmcdermott.com

Kirstyn McDermott is an Australian writer of speculative fiction.

== Biography ==
McDermott was born in Newcastle, New South Wales, Australia on 31 October. She grew up in Woodberry, New South Wales and attended the University of Newcastle where she completed a Bachelor of Arts. In 1995 McDermott moved to Melbourne where she currently lives with her husband Jason Nahrung. McDermott is a member of the SuperNOVA writers group.

McDermott was first published in 1993 with the short story "I Am the Silent Voyeur" being featured in Daarke Worlde No. 4. Her 2003 short story "The Truth About Pug Roberts", featured in the anthology Southern Blood: New Australian Tales of the Supernatural, was nominated for the 2004 Ditmar Award for best short story. Her short story "Painlessness" won the 2008 Aurealis Award for Best Horror Short Story and the 2009 Ditmar Award for best novella or novelette. In 2010 her first novel, Madigan Mine, was published by Picador and won the 2010 Aurealis Award for best horror novel as well as being nominated for three other awards.

== Awards and nominations ==
Year	Award	Work	Category	Result
2001	Aurealis Award	"Smile for Me"	Best horror short story	Honourable mention
2004	Ditmar Award	"The Truth About Pug Roberts"	Best short story	Nomination
2007	Ditmar Award	"Cold"	Best short story	Nomination
2008	Aurealis Award	"Painlessness"	Best horror short story	Won
2009	Chronos Award	"Painlessness"	Best short fiction	Won
2009	Ditmar Award	Midnight Echo (with Ian Mond)	Best collected work	Nomination
2009	Ditmar Award	"Painlessness"	Best Australian novella or novelette	Won
2010	Aurealis Award	Madigan Mine	Best horror novel	Won
2010	Australian Shadows Award	Madigan Mine	Best long fiction	Nomination
2010	Australian Shadows Award	"She Said"	Best short fiction	Won
2010	Bram Stoker Award	"Monsters Among Us"	Best long fiction	Nomination
2011	Chronos Award	Madigan Mine	Best long fiction	Won
2011	Ditmar Award	Madigan Mine	Best novel	Nomination
2011	Ditmar Award	"She Said"	Best short story	Won
2012	Aurealis Award	Perfections	Best horror novel	Won
2020	Aurealis Award	Never Afters: Female Friendship and Collaboration in Contemporary Re-visioned Fairy Tales by Women	Convenors’ award for excellence	Won

== Bibliography ==
=== Novels ===
- Madigan Mine (2010)
- Perfections (2012)

=== Short fiction ===
- "I Am the Silent Voyeur" (1993) in Daarke Worlde No. 4
- "Softly, Softly Tread the Night" (1993) in Opus
- "The Publican's Tale" (1994) in Opus
- "Rage" (1994) in Shadows of Life
- "And the Moon Yelps" (1994) in Bloodsongs No. 3 (ed. Chris A. Masters, Steve Proposch)
- "Running with the Gods" (1995) in Skintomb No. 6
- "Every Time She Spoke His Name" (1996) in Skintomb No. 7
- "Red" (1996) in Cosmopolitan
- "Tears for Broken Toys" (1997) in Bloodsongs No. 8 (ed. Steve Proposch)
- "Smile for Me" (2001) in Redsine No. 6
- "Silver and Gold, My Love, Silver and Gold" (2002) in Tourniquet Heart
- "Louisa" (2002) in Redsine No. 7 (ed. Garry Nurrish)
- "RavensPerch: A Faerie Tale" (2003) in Andromeda Spaceways Inflight Magazine No. 5 (ed. Danuta Shaw)
- "The Truth About Pug Roberts" (2003) in Southern Blood (ed. Bill Congreve)
- "Cold" (2006) in Shadowed Realms No. 9
- "Somewhere Else: Jane" (2006) in Mitch? No. 4
- "Shadow Puppet" (2007) in FlashSpec No. 2
- "Golden" (2007) in Island No. 110
- "Painlessness" (2008) in Greatest Uncommon Denominator No. 2 (ed. Kaolin Fire, Sue Miller, Julia Bernd, Debbie Moorhouse)
- "Feather" (2008) in Black Box
- "Indigo in Absentia" (2008) in Southerly No. 68/3
- "Soon the Teeth" (2009) in Antipodean SF No. 128
- "She Said" (2010) in Scenes from the Second Storey (ed. Amanda Pillar, Pete Kempshall)
- "Monsters Among Us" (2010) in Macabre: A Journey through Australia's Darkest Fears (ed. Angela Challis, Marty Young)
- "We All Fall Down" (2010) in Aurealis No. 44 (ed. Stuart Mayne)
- "Frostbitten" in More Scary Kisses
- "She Said" in Novascapes (ed. C.E. Page)
- "Triquetra" (2018) on Tor.com (available online)

== Links ==
- Official website
- Kirstyn McDermott at the Internet Speculative Fiction Database
