= Aurealis Award for Best Horror Short Story =

Literary award

Aurealis Award for best horror short story
- Awarded for: Excellence in horror fiction short stories
- Country: Australia
- Presented by: Chimaera Publications, Continuum Foundation
- First award: 1995
- Currently held by: Chris Mason (writer)
- Website: Official site

The Aurealis Awards are presented annually by the Australia-based Chimaera Publications and WASFF to published works in order to "recognise the achievements of Australian science fiction, fantasy, and horror writers". To qualify, a work must have been first published by an Australian citizen or permanent resident between 1 January and 31 December of the corresponding year; the presentation ceremony is held the following year. It has grown from a small function of around 20 people to a two-day event attended by over 200 people.

Since their creation in 1995, awards have been given in various categories of speculative fiction. Categories currently include science fiction, fantasy, horror, speculative young adult fiction—with separate awards for novels and short fiction—collections, anthologies, illustrative works or graphic novels, children's books, and an award for excellence in speculative fiction. The awards have attracted the attention of publishers by setting down a benchmark in science fiction and fantasy. The continued sponsorship by publishers such as HarperCollins and Orbit has identified the award as an honour to be taken seriously.

The results are decided by a panel of judges from a list of submitted nominees; the long-list of nominees is reduced to a short-list of finalists. Ties can occur if the panel decides both entries show equal merit, however they are encouraged to choose a single winner. The judges are selected from a public application process by the Award's management team.

This article lists all the short-list nominees and winners in the best horror short story category, as well as short stories that have received honourable mentions or have been highly commended. A work of fiction is defined as a short story if it is fewer than 40,000 words long. Since 2001, honourable mentions and high commendations have been awarded intermittently. Paul Haines has won the award four times, while three people have won the award twice – Simon Brown, Kaaron Warren and Sean Williams. Warren holds the record for most nominations, with nine. Robert Hood holds the record for most nominations without winning, having been a losing finalist four times.

== Winners and nominees ==
In the following table, the years correspond to the year of the story's eligibility; the ceremonies are always held the following year. Each year links to the corresponding "year in literature" article. Entries with a blue background have won the award; those with a white background are the nominees on the short-list. If the short story was originally published in a book with other stories rather than by itself or in a magazine, the book title is included after the publisher's name.

* Winners and joint winners
* Nominees on the shortlist

Year	Author(s)	Short story	Publisher or publication	Ref
1995	Francis Payne*	"Olympia"	Bambada Press (Olympia)	
1995	Terry Dowling	"Scaring the Train"	MirrorDanse (The Man Who Lost Red)	
1995	Leanne Frahm	"Entropy"	Sybylla (She's Fantastical)	
1995	Philip Neilsen	"Rock and Roll Has to Die"	Reed Books (Dark House)	
1995	Kaaron Warren	"Skin Holes"	Penguin (Strange Fruit)	
1996	Sean Williams*	"Passing the Bone"	Eidolon	
1996	Stephen Dedman	"Never Seen by Waking Eyes"	F&SF (Vol 91 No 2)	
1996	Terry Dowling	"Beckoning Nightframe"	Eidolon	
1996	Patricia MacCormack	"The Bloom of Decay"	Bloodsongs	
1996	Kaaron Warren	"The Hanging People"	Bloodsongs	
1997	Terry Dowling*	"Jenny Come to Play"	Eidolon	
1997	Bill Congreve	"The Mullet That Screwed John West"	MirrorDanse (Epiphanies of Blood)	
1997	J. M. Earle	"Ten Minutes of Midnight"	Aurealis (#18)	
1997	Sean Williams	"The Freezing of Sarah"	Bloodsongs	
1998	Kaaron Warren*	"A Positive"	Bloodsongs	
1998	Paul Brandon	"The Marsh Runners"	Voyager (Dreaming Down-Under)	
1998	Glyn Parry	"Dawn Chorus"	Moonstone (Fantastic Worlds)	
1998	Aaron Sterns	"The Third Rail"	Voyager (Dreaming Down-Under)	
1998	Kaaron Warren	"The Glass Woman"	Aurealis (#22)	
1999	Sean Williams & Simon Brown*	"Atrax"	Ticonderoga (New Adventures in Sci-Fi)	
1999	Allan Baillie	"The Mouth"	Longman (SpinOuts)	
1999	Stephen Dedman	"Honest Ghosts"	Gothic.net	
1999	Kain Massin	"Escape from Stalingrad"	Harbinger	
1999	Alison Venugoban	"Funeral Rights"	Harbinger	
2000	Deborah Biancotti*	"The First and Final Game"	Altair	
2000	Jack Dann	"Marilyn"	Eidolon	
2000	Stephen Dedman	"A Sentiment Open to Doubt"	Ticonderoga Online	
2000	Robert Hood	"That Old Black Graffiti"	Hodder (Tales from the Wasteland)	
2000	Michael Pryor	"Sewercide"	Aurealis	
2001	Simon Haynes*	"Sleight of Hand"	Potato Monkey	
2001	Stephen Dedman	"Probable Cause"	Orb	
2001	Robert Hood	"Rotten Times"	Aurealis	
2001	Rick Kennett & Paul Collins	"Whispers"	Cosmos Books (Stalking Midnight)	
2001	Alison Venugoban	"Happy Birthday to Me"	CSFG Publishing (Nor of Human...)	
2002	Kim Westwood*	"Oracle"	Redsine	
2002	Stephen Dedman	"Wastelands"	Agog! (Agog! Fantastic Fiction)	
2002	Claire McKenna	"What the Tide Brings"	Fables and Reflections	
2002	Chris McMahon	"Within Twilight"	Redsine	
2003	Simon Brown*	"Love is a Stone"	HarperCollins (Gathering the Bones)	
2003	Stephen Dedman	"The Wind Shall Blow For Ever Mair"	HarperCollins (Gathering the Bones)	
2003	Sue Isle	"Amy's Stars"	Orb	
2003	Kyla Ward	"Kijin Tea"	Agog! (Agog! Terrific Tales)	
2003	Janeen Webb	"Blake's Angel"	HarperCollins (Gathering the Bones)	
2004	Paul Haines*	"The Last Days of Kali Yuga"	NFG	
2004	Stephen Dedman	"Twilight of the Idols"	DAW (Conqueror Fantastic)	
2004	Richard Harland	"The Border"	Agog! (Agog! Smashing Stories)	
2004	Ben Peek	"Dr Who (or the day I learned to love Tom Baker)"	Wakefield Press (Forever Shores)	
2004	Alinta Thornton	"Kathleen, Furnished with Bees"	Dark Animus	
2005	Lee Battersby*	"Pater Familias"	Shadowed Realms	
2005	James Cain	"The Ride"	Dark Krypt	
2005	Paul Haines	"Doof, Doof, Doof"	Dark Animus	
2005	Chuck McKenzie	"Eight-Beat Bar"	Aurealis	
2005	Cat Sparks	"Macciato Lane"	Ticonderoga Online	
2006	Stephen Dedman*	"Dead of Winter"	Weird Tales	
2006	Margo Lanagan	"Winkie"	Allen & Unwin (Red Spikes)	
2006	Chris Lawson	"Hieronymous Boche"	Eidolon Books (Eidolon I)	
2006	Kaaron Warren	"Dead Sea Fruit"	Fantasy Magazine	
2006	Kaaron Warren	"Woman Train"	CSFG Publishing (The Outcast)	
2007	Anna Tambour*	"The Jeweller of Second-Hand Roe"	Subterranean	
2007	Terry Dowling	"Toother"	Night Shade Books (Eclipse One)	
2007	Richard Harland	"Special Perceptions"	Ash-Tree Press (At Ease with the Dead)	
2007	Rick Kennett	"The Dark and What It Said"	Andromeda Spaceways Inflight Magazine (#28)	
2007	Ben Peek	"Black Betty"	Lone Star Stories	
2008	Kirstyn McDermott*	"Painlessness"	Greatest Uncommon Denominator	
2008	Lee Battersby	"In From the Snow'"	HarperVoyager (Dreaming Again)	
2008	Deborah Biancotti	"Pale Dark Soldier"	Midnight Echo	
2008	Trent Jamieson	"Day Boy"	Murky Depths	
2008	Ian McHugh	"Bitter Dreams"	Galaxy Press (L. Ron Hubbard Presents Writers of the Future Volume XXIV)	
2009	Paul Haines* (tie)	"Slice of Life – A Spot of Liver"	The Mayne Press (Slice of Life)	
2009	Paul Haines* (tie)	"Wives"	Coeur de Lion Publishing (X6)	
2009	Felicity Dowker	"Jesse's Gift"	Andromeda Spaceways Inflight Magazine (#40)	
2009	Christopher Green	"Having Faith"	Nossa Morte	
2009	Andrew J. McKiernan	"The Message"	Midnight Echo	
2010	Richard Harland*	"The Fear"	Brimstone Press (Macabre: A Journey Through Australia's Darkest Fears)	
2010	Bob Franklin	"Take the Free Tour"	Affirm Press (Under Stones)	
2010	Paul Haines	"Her Gallant Needs"	Twelfth Planet Press (Sprawl)	
2010	Robert Hood	"Wasting Matilda"	Constable & Robinson (Zombie Apocalypse!)	
2010	Martin Livings	"Lollo"	Apex Publishing (Close Encounters of the Urban Kind)	
2011	Paul Haines* (tie)	"The Past is a Bridge Best Left Burnt"	Brimstone Press (The Last Days of Kali Yuga)	
2011	Lisa L. Hannett* (tie)	"The Short Go: a Future in Eight Seconds"	Ticonderoga Publications (Bluegrass Symphony)	
2011	Deborah Biancotti	"And the Dead Shall Outnumber the Living"	Gilgamesh Press (Ishtar)	
2011	Margo Lanagan	"Mulberry Boys"	Tor Books (Blood and Other Cravings)	
2011	Angela Slatter	"The Coffin Maker's Daughter"	Quercus Books (A Book of Horrors)	
2012	Kaaron Warren*	"Sky"	Twelfth Planet Press (Through Splintered Walls)	
2012	Joanne Anderton	"Sanaa's Army"	Ticonderoga Publications (Bloodstones)	
2012	Jodi Cleghorn	"Elyora"	Review of Australian Fiction, Rabbit Hole Special Issue	
2012	Felicity Dowker	"To Wish Upon a Clockwork Heart"	Ticonderoga Publications (Bread And Circuses)	
2012	Robert Hood	"Escena de un Asesinato"	PS Publishing (Exotic Gothic 4)	
2013	Kim Wilkins*	"The Year of Ancient Ghosts"	Ticonderoga Publications (The Year of Ancient Ghosts)	
2013	Joanne Anderton	"Fencelines"	FableCroft Publishing (The Bone Chime Song and Other Stories)	
2013	Terry Dowling	"The Sleepover"	PS Publishing (Exotic Gothic 5)	
2013	Kirstyn McDermott	"The Home for Broken Dolls"	Twelfth Planet Press (Caution: Contains Small Parts)	
2013	Kaaron Warren	"The Human Moth"	Miskatonic Press (The Grimscribe's Puppets)	
2014	Angela Slatter*	"Home and Hearth"	Spectral Press (Home and Hearth)	
2014	Deborah Biancotti	"The Executioner Goes Home"	Review of Australian Fiction (Vol 11, No 6)	
2014	James Bradley	"Skinsuit"	Island Magazine (#137)	
2014	Kirstyn McDermott	"By The Moon's Good Grace"	Review of Australian Fiction (Vol 12, No 3)	
2014	Garth Nix	"Shay Corsham Worsted"	ChiZine Publications (Fearful Symmetries)	
2015	Joanne Anderton*	"Bullets"	AHWA (In Sunshine Bright and Darkness Deep)	
2015	Lisa L. Hannett	"Consorting With Fish"	Cohesion Press (Blurring the Line)	
2015	Lisa L. Hannett	"Heirloom Pieces"	Apex Publications (Apex Magazine)	
2015	Deborah Kalin	"The Briskwater Mare"	Twelfth Planet Press (Cherry Crow Children)	
2015	Tracie McBride	"Breaking Windows"	Aurealis (#84)	
2015	Kirstyn McDermott	"Self, Contained"	TDM Press (The Dark)	
2016	T. R. Napper*	"Flame Trees"	Asimov's Science Fiction, April/May 2016	
2016	R. P. L. Johnson	"Non Zero Sum"	Cohesion Press (SNAFU: Hunters)	
2016	Garth Nix	"Penny for a Match, Mister?"	Saga Press (The Starlit Wood: New Fairy Tales	
2016	Angela Slatter	"The Red Forest"	PS Publishing (Winter Children and Other Chilling Tales)	
2016	Kaaron Warren	"68 Days"	Broken Eye Books (Tomorrow's Cthulhu	
2016	Durand Welsh	"Life, or Whatever Passes For It"	Grey Matter Press (Peel Back the Skin)	
2017	J. Ashley Smith*	"Old Growth"	IFWG Publishing Australia (SQ Mag 31)	
2017	Kat Clay	"Reef"	IFWG Publishing Australia (SQ Mag 31)	
2017	Lisa L. Hannett	"Outside, a Drifter"	Dim Shores (Looming Low)	
2017	Deborah Sheldon	"Angel Hair"	IFWG Publishing Australia (Perfect Little Stitches and Other Stories)	
2017	Alfie Simpson	"The Endless Below"	Breach (#2)	
2017	J. Ashley Smith	"On the Line"	Australasian Horror Writer's Association (Midnight Echo 12)	
2018	Alfie Simpson*	"Sub-Urban"	Breach (#7)	
2018	Michael Gardner	"The Offering"	Aurealis (#112)	
2018	Jason Nahrung	"Slither"	IFWG Publishing Australia (Cthulhu Deep Down Under 2)	
2018	Jessica Nelson-Tyers	"By Kindle Light"	AntipodeanSF (#235)	
2018	Jessica Nelson-Tyers	"Hit and Rot"	Breach (#8)	
2018	J. Ashley Smith	"The Further Shore"	Bourbon Penn (#15)	
2019	Chris Mason*	"Vivienne and Agnes"	(self-published) Beside the Seaside – Tales from the Day Tripper	
2019	Joanne Anderton	"Loose Stones"	Xoum (Infinite Threads)	
2019	Grace Chan	"The Mark"	Monash University Publishing (Verge 2019, Uncanny)	
2019	Matthew R Davis	"Pilgrimage"	Breach (#10)	
2019	Terry Dowling	"The Unwrapping"	Saga Press (Echoes)	
2019	Jason Fischer	"Of Meat and Man"	Cohesion Press (SNAFU: Last Stand, Cohesion Press)	
2019	J Ashley Smith	"The Moth Tapes"	Aurealis (#117)	
2020	Jessica Nelson-Tyers*	"Phoenix Pharmaceuticals"	Deadset Press (Cancer, The Zodiac Series #7)	
2020	Elaine Cuyegkeng	"The Genetic Alchemist's Daughter"	Omnium Gatherum (Black Cranes: Tales of Unquiet Women)	
2020	Martin Livings	"The Bone Fairy"	Midnight Echo (#15)	
2020	Garth Nix	"Many Mouths to Make a Meal"	Anchor Books (Final Cuts)	
2020	Helena O'Connor	"How We Felt"	Aurealis (#136)	
2021	Lisa Fuller	"Don’t Look!"	Wakefield Press (Hometown Haunts: #LoveOzYA Horror Tales)	
2021	Ephiny Gale	"Traces of Us, Hot Enough for Dinner"	The Dread Machine (#1.3)	
2021	Maria Lewis	"The House that Hungers"	Aurealis (#146)	
2021	Martin Livings	"The Quiet Room"	Midnight Echo (#16)	
2021	Tracie McBride	"Sins of the Mother"	IFWG (Spawn: Weird Horror Tales About Pregnancy, Birth and Babies)	
2021	Antoinette Rydyr	"Mother Dandelion"	IFWG (Spawn: Weird Horror Tales About Pregnancy, Birth and Babies)	
2022	Geneve Flynn	"They Call Me Mother"	Classic Monsters Unleashed	
2022	Aaron Dries	"Nona Doesn't Dance"	Cut to Care: A Collection of Little Hurts	
2022	Geneve Flynn	"Lidless Eyes That See"	Tales from the Waste Land	
2022	Pamela Jeffs	"Dread Circus"	That is TOO Wrong! An Anthology of Offbeat Horror Vol 2	
2022	Martin Livings	"The Hunt"	Light Falling from a Long Dead Star	
2022	Matt Tighe	"Beach Memories"	The NoSleep Podcast, S18E06	
2023	Pamela Jeffs	"Death interrupted"	Body of Work	
2023	Matthew R. Davies	"Il re Giallo"	Strange Aeon	
2023	Pamela Jeffs	"Stokehold"	SNAFU: Punk'd	
2023	Matt Tighe	"There are things on me"	Killer creatures down under: Horror stories with bite	
2023	Matt Tighe	"Trial by fire"	Etherea Magazine #18	
2023	Pauline Yates	"Blood born"	Midnight Echo #18	
2024	Ben Matthews	"Flesh of My Flesh"	Spawn 2: More Weird Horror Tales About Pregnancy, Birth and Babies	
2024	Jeff Clulow	"Hackles"	Remixed Myths	
2024	Michael Gardner	"Changeling"	Aurealis #167	
2024	Kirstyn McDermott	"These Pale Shadows"	Nosferatu Unbound	
2024	Matt Tighe	"Envelopes"	Spawn 2: More Weird Horror Tales About Pregnancy	
2024	Guan Un	"An Object of Vision"	Fission #4	
2025	Kirstyn McDermott	"It Will Only Hurt If I Want It To"	Midnight Echo #20	
2025	Ella T. Holmes	"Catch and Consume"	Aurealis #185	
2025	Fionn MacPherson	"The Bottom Feeders"	Lost Souls Issue 2	
2025	Carol Ryles	"The Shelter"	Midnight Echo #20	
2025	Kaaron Warren	"Bitter Skin"	Night and Day	
2025	Corey Jae White and Maddison Stoff	"Me, Espresso"	Patreon	

== Honourable mentions and high commendations ==
In the following table, the years correspond to the year of the book's eligibility; the ceremonies are always held the following year. Each year links to the corresponding "year in literature" article. Entries with a grey background have been noted as highly commended; those with a white background have received honourable mentions. If the short story was originally published in a book with other stories rather than by itself or in a magazine, the book title is included after the publisher's name.

* Highly commended
* Honourable mentions

Year	Author	Short story	Publisher or publication	Ref
2001	Kirstyn McDermott	"Smile for Me"	Redsine	
2001	Stephen Dedman	"Ravens"	Interzone	
2002	Robert Hood	"Number 7"	MirrorDanse (Immaterial)	
2002	Deborah Biancotti	"Silicon Cast"	Redsine	
2004	Paul Haines*	"They Say It’s Other People"	Agog! (Agog! Smashing Stories)	
2005	Peter Barber*	"Dust"	Aurealis	
2005	Shane Jiraiya Cummings*	"Revision Is Murder"	Simulacrum	
2005	Greg Guerin*	"The Deviation Road"	Borderlands	
2005	Paul Haines*	"The Light in Autumn’s Leaves"	Borderlands	
2005	Martin Livings*	"In Nomine Patris"	Shadowed Realms	
2006	Jacinta Butterworth	"Love Affair"	Coeur de Lion Publishing (C0ck)	
2006	Dirk Flinthart	"One Night Stand"	Agog! (Agog! Ripping Reads)	
2006	Margo Lanagan	"Under Hell, Over Heaven"	Allen & Unwin (Red Spikes)	
2006	A. M. Muffaz	"Mosquito Story"	Fantasy Magazine	
2007	Margo Lanagan	"She-Creatures"	Night Shade Books (Eclipse One)	
2007	Martin Livings	"There was Darkness"	Ticonderoga (Fantastic Wonder Stories)	
2007	Miranda Siemienowicz	"Lion’s Breath"	Island	

== See also ==
- Ditmar Award, an Australian science fiction award established in 1969
