= Catabolic Magic =

Short story by Richard Harland

- Short story by Richard Harland
- Country: Australia
- Language: English
- Genre: Fantasy

Publication
- Published in: Aurealis #32
- Publication type: Periodical
- Publisher: Chimaera Publications
- Media type: Print (Magazine)
- Publication date: April 2004

"Catabolic Magic" is a 2004 fantasy short story by English writer Richard Harland.

== Background ==
"Catabolic Magic" was first published in April 2004 in Aurealis #32, edited by Keith Stevenson and published by Chimaera Publications. It was published alongside five other stories by the authors Paul Haines, Stephen Dedman, Sue Isle, Tansy Rayner Roberts, and Brendan Duffy. "Catabolic Magic" joint-won the 2004 Aurealis Award for best fantasy short story along with Louise Katz' "Weavers of the Twilight" and was a short-list nominee for the 2005 Ditmar Award for best Australian novella or novelette.
