= Aurealis Award for Best Collection =

Aurealis Award for best collection
- Awarded for: Excellence in speculative fiction collections
- Country: Australia
- Presented by: Chimaera Publications, Continuum Foundation
- First award: 2008
- Currently held by: Alan Baxter
- Website: Official site

The Aurealis Awards are presented annually by the Australia-based Chimaera Publications and WASFF to published works in order to "recognise the achievements of Australian science fiction, fantasy, horror writers". To qualify, a work must have been first published by an Australian citizen or permanent resident between 1 January and 31 December of the corresponding year; the presentation ceremony is held the following year. It has grown from a small function of around 20 people to a two-day event attended by over 200 people.

Since their creation in 1995, awards have been given in various categories of speculative fiction. Categories currently include science fiction, fantasy, horror, speculative young adult fiction—with separate awards for novels and short fiction—collections, anthologies, illustrative works or graphic novels, children's books, and an award for excellence in speculative fiction. The awards have attracted the attention of publishers by setting down a benchmark in science fiction and fantasy. The continued sponsorship by publishers such as HarperCollins and Orbit has identified the award as an honour to be taken seriously.

The results are decided by a panel of judges from a list of submitted nominees; the long-list of nominees is reduced to a short-list of finalists. The judges are selected from a public application process by the Award's management team.

The award for best collection was first awarded in 2008 along with two other categories; best anthology and best illustrated book or graphic novel to replace the discontinued Golden Aurealis awards.

This article lists all the short-list nominees and winners in the best collection category. As of the 2021 awards, and August 2022, Angela Slatter holds the record for most wins, having won four times. Slatter also holds the record for most nominations, having been nominated ten times.

== Winners and nominees ==
In the following table, the years correspond to the year of the book's eligibility; the ceremonies are always held the following year. Each year links to the corresponding "year in literature" article. Entries with a blue background have won the award; those with a white background are the nominees on the short-list.

* Winners and joint winners
* Nominees on the shortlist

| Year | Author & Editor | Collection | Publisher | Ref |
|---|---|---|---|---|
| 2008 | Sean Williams* & Russell B. Farr* (editor) | Magic Dirt: The Best of Sean Williams | Ticonderoga Publications | |
| 2008 | Robert Hood | Creeping in Reptile Flesh | Altair Australia Books | |
| 2009 | Greg Egan*^{[I]} | Oceanic | Gollancz | |
| 2009 | Deborah Biancotti & Alisa Krasnostein (editor) | A Book of Endings | Twelfth Planet Press | |
| 2009 | Paul Haines & Geoffrey Maloney (editor) | Slice of Life | The Mayne Press | |
| 2009 | Robbie Matthews & Donna Hanson (editor) | Johnny Phillips Werewolf Detective | Australian Speculative Fiction | |
| 2010 | Angela Slatter* | The Girl With No Hands | Ticonderoga Publications | |
| 2010 | Rjurik Davidson | The Library of Forgotten Books | PS Publishing | |
| 2010 | Bob Franklin | Under Stones | Affirm Press | |
| 2010 | Angela Slatter | Sourdough and Other Stories | Tartarus Press | |
| 2010 | Kaaron Warren | Dead Sea Fruit | Ticonderoga Publications | |
| 2011 | Lisa L. Hannett* | Bluegrass Symphony | Ticonderoga Publications | |
| 2011 | Deborah Biancotti | Bad Power | Twelfth Planet Press | |
| 2011 | Paul Haines | Last Days of Kali Yuga | Brimstone Press | |
| 2011 | Sue Isle | Nightsiders | Twelfth Planet Press | |
| 2011 | Tansy Rayner Roberts | Love and Romanpunk | Twelfth Planet Press | |
| 2012 | K. J. Bishop* | That Book Your Mad Ancestor Wrote | K. J. Bishop | |
| 2012 | Isobelle Carmody | Metro Winds | Allen & Unwin | |
| 2012 | Lisa L. Hannett & Angela Slatter | Midnight and Moonshine | Ticonderoga Publications | |
| 2012 | Martin Livings | Living With the Dead | Dark Prints Press | |
| 2012 | Kaaron Warren | Through Splintered Walls | Twelfth Planet Press | |
| 2013 | Joanne Anderton* | The Bone Chime Song and Other Stories | FableCroft Publishing | |
| 2013 | Thoraiya Dyer | Asymmetry | Twelfth Planet Press | |
| 2013 | Kirstyn McDermott | Caution: Contains Small Parts | Twelfth Planet Press | |
| 2013 | Cat Sparks | The Bride Price | Ticonderoga Publications | |
| 2013 | Kim Wilkins | The Year of Ancient Ghosts | Ticonderoga Publications | |
| 2014 | Lisa L. Hannett* & Angela Slatter* | The Female Factory | Twelfth Planet Press | |
| 2014 | Rosaleen Love | Secret Lives | Twelfth Planet Press | |
| 2014 | Ian McHugh | Angel Dust | Ticonderoga Publications | |
| 2014 | Simon Petrie | Difficult Second Album: more stories of Xenobiology, Space Elevators, and Bats Out of Hell | Peggy Bright Books | |
| 2014 | Angela Slatter | The Bitterwood Bible and Other Recountings | Tartarus Press | |
| 2014 | Angela Slatter | Black-Winged Angels | Ticonderoga Publications | |
| 2015 | Garth Nix* | To Hold the Bridge | Allen & Unwin | |
| 2015 | Shane Jiraiya Cummings | The Abandonment of Grace and Everything After | Brimstone Press | |
| 2015 | Dirk Flinthart | Striking Fire | FableCroft Publishing | |
| 2015 | Deborah Kalin | Cherry Crow Children | Twelfth Planet Press | |
| 2015 | Carole Nomarhas | The Fading | (self-published) | |
| 2015 | Anna Tambour | The Finest Ass in the Universe | Ticonderoga Publications | |
| 2016 | Angela Slatter* | A Feast of Sorrows | Prime | |
| 2016 | Alan Baxter | Crow Shine | Ticonderoga Publications | |
| 2016 | Jack Dann | Concentration | PS Publishing | |
| 2016 | Angela Slatter | Winter Children | PS Publishing | |
| 2017 | Kate Forsyth* & Kim Wilkins* | The Silver Well | Ticonderoga Publications | |
| 2017 | Peter M. Ball | The Birdcage Heart & Other Strange Tales | Brain Jar Press | |
| 2017 | Donna Maree Hanson | Beneath the Floating City | (self-published) | |
| 2017 | Margo Lanagan | Singing My Sister Down and Other Stories | Allen & Unwin | |
| 2017 | Tansy Rayner Roberts | Please Look After This Angel & Other Winged Stories | (self-published) | |
| 2017 | Deborah Sheldon | Perfect Little Stitches and Other Stories | IFWG Publishing | |
| 2018 | Shaun Tan* | Tales from The Inner City | Allen & Unwin | |
| 2018 | Peter M. Ball | Not Quite the End of the World | Brain Jar Press | |
| 2018 | Margo Lanagan | Phantom Limbs | PS Publishing | |
| 2018 | Kaaron Warren | Exploring Dark Short Fiction 2: A Primer to Kaaron Warren | Dark Moon Books | |
| 2019 | J. S. Breukelaar* | Collision: Stories | Meerkat Press | |
| 2019 | Aiki Flinthart | Blackbirds Sing | CAT Press | |
| 2019 | Narrelle M. Harris | Scar Tissue and Other Stories | Clan Destine Press | |
| 2019 | Pamela Jeffs | Five Dragons | Four Ink Press | |
| 2019 | Margo Lanagan | Stray Bats | Small Beer Press | |
| 2019 | Charlie Nash | Men and Machines I: Space Operas and Special Ops | Flying Nun Publications | |
| 2020 | Angela Slatter* | The Heart is a Mirror for Sinners and Other Stories | PS Publishing | |
| 2020 | Lisa L. Hannett | Songs for Dark Seasons | Ticonderoga Publications | |
| 2020 | Juliet Marillier | Mother Thorn and Other Tales of Courage and Kindness | Serenity Press | |
| 2020 | Tansy Rayner Roberts | Castle Charming | (self-published) | |
| 2020 | Tansy Rayner Roberts | Unreal Alchemy | (self-published) | |
| 2020 | Cat Sparks | Dark Harvest | NewCon Press | |
| 2021 | Alan Baxter* | The Gulp | (self-published) | |
| 2021 | Eugen Bacon | Danged Black Thing | Transit Lounge | |
| 2021 | Sean Williams | Little Labyrinths: Collection Microfictions | Brain Jar Press | |
| 2021 | Angela Slatter | The Tallow-Wife & Other Tales | Tartarus Press | |
| 2021 | Pamela Jeffs | The Terralight Collection | Four Ink Press | |
| 2022 | Chris Flynn | Here be Leviathans | University of Queensland Press | |
| 2022 | Joanne Anderton | The Art of Broken Things | Trepidatio Publishing | |
| 2022 | Alan Baxter | The Fall: Tales From The Gulp 2 | 13th Dragon Books | |
| 2022 | Else Fitzgerald | Everything Feels Like the End of the World | Allen & Unwin | |
| 2022 | Kirstyn McDermott | Hard Places | Trepidatio Publishing | |
| 2022 | Tansy Rayner Roberts | Team Queen | self-published | |
| 2023 | John Morrissey | Firelight | Text | |
| 2023 | J Ashley-Smith | The Measure of Sorrow: Stories | Meerkat Press | |
| 2023 | Helen Marshall | The Gold Leaf Executions | Unsung Stories | |
| 2024 | D. K. Mok | The Heart of the Labyrinth and Other Stories | self-published | |
| 2024 | Ephiny Gale | Pick Your Potion | Foxgrove Press | |
| 2024 | Kathleen Jennings | Kindling | Small Beer Press | |
| 2025 | Jeff Clulow | The Leper’s Garden and Other Contagions | Third Eye Press | |
| 2025 | Alex Cothren | Playing Nice Was Getting Me Nowhere | Pink Shorts | |
| 2025 | Matthew R. Davis | Songs of Shadow, Words of Woe | JournalStone | |
| 2025 | Pamela Jeffs | This Dark Architect and Other Grim Tales | Four Ink Press | |
| 2025 | Matt Tighe | Drowning in the Dark and Other Stories | IFWG Publishing | |

I

Egan declined to accept the award for Oceanic.

== See also ==
- Ditmar Award, an Australian science fiction award established in 1969
