= Agog! Smashing Stories =

- Agog! Smashing Stories first edition cover
- Author: Cat Sparks (editor)
- Cover artist: Cat Sparks
- Language: English
- Genre: Speculative fiction
- Publisher: Agog! Press
- Publication date: 2004
- Publication place: Australia
- Media type: Print (paperback)
- Pages: 291 (first edition)
- ISBN: 0-9580567-3-0

Agog! Smashing Stories is a 2004 Australian speculative fiction anthology edited by Cat Sparks.

== Background ==
Agog! Smashing Stories was first published in Australia in 2004 by Agog! Press in trade paperback format. It was a short-list nominee for best collected work at the 2005 Ditmar Awards but lost to Black Juice by Margo Lanagan. Agog! Smashing Stories features 20 stories by 20 authors. Two of the stories featured in the anthology won an Aurealis Award. Brendan Duffy's, "Come to Daddy" won the 2004 Aurealis Award for best science fiction short story and Louise Katz' "Weavers of the Twilight" won the 2004 Aurealis Award for best fantasy short story. Four other stories were also short-list nominees and the Ditmar Awards and the Aurealis Awards – "The Border" by Richard Harland was a finalist for the Aurealis Award for best horror short story, Simon Brown's, "Water Babies" was a nominee for the 2005 Ditmar Award for best novella or novelette, and Ben Peek's "R" and Deborah Biancotti's "Number 3 Raw Place" were both short-list nominees for the 2005 Ditmar Award for best short story. Artwork by Cat Sparks for Agog! Smashing Stories was also a short-list nominee but lost to Kerri Valkova who created the cover for Richard Harland's The Black Crusade.

== Contents ==
- Foreword by Cat Sparks
- "Regolith", short fiction by Robert Hood
- "Warchalking", short fiction by Paul Haines and Claire McKenna
- "Humosity", short story by Jeremy Shaw
- "Number 3 Raw Place", short story by Deborah Biancotti
- "Gaslight à Go Go", short fiction by Dirk Flinthart
- "The Cascade", short story by Sean McMullen
- "Seven Wives", short story by Bryn Sparks
- "Where Did You Sleep Last Night?", short story by Justine Larbalestier
- "Temenos", short story by Kim Westwood
- "Maelstrom", short fiction by Martin Livings
- "They Say It's Other People", short story by Paul Haines
- "Inside the Mountain", short story by Grace Dugan
- "R", short story by Ben Peek
- "Gin Jackson: Neophyte Ranger", short story by Marianne de Pierres
- "The Border", short story by Richard Harland
- "Water Babies", novelette by Simon Brown
- "Weavers of the Twilight", short story by Louise Katz
- "Endure", short story by Trent Jamieson
- "Come to Daddy", short fiction by Brendan Duffy
- "Porn Again", short story by Iain Triffitt
