= Weavers of the Twilight =

"Weavers of Twilight"
- Short story by Louise Katz
- Country: Australia
- Language: English
- Genre: Fantasy short story

Publication
- Published in: Agog! Smashing Stories
- Publication type: Anthology
- Publisher: Agog! Press
- Media type: Print (Paperback)
- Publication date: 2004

"Weavers of Twilight" is a 2004 fantasy short story by Louise Katz.

== Background ==
"Weavers of Twilight" was first published in 2004 in Agog! Smashing Stories, edited by Cat Sparks and published by Agog! Press. It was published alongside 19 other stories by the authors Robert Hood, Paul Haines, Claire McKenna, Jeremy Shaw, Deborah Biancotti, Dirk Flinthart, Sean McMullen, Bryn Sparks, Justine Larbalestier, Kim Westwood, Martin Livings, Grace Dugan, Ben Peek, Marianne de Pierres, Richard Harland, Simon Brown, Trent Jamieson, Brendan Duffy and Iain Triffitt. "Weavers of Twilight" joint-won the 2004 Aurealis Award for best fantasy short story along with Richard Harland's "Catabolic Magic".
