= Shadowed Realms =

Australian online magazine

- Website type: Dark flash fiction
- Owner: Brimstone Press
- Creators: Angela Challis and Shane Jiraiya Cummings
- Editor: Angela Challis
- Website: www.shadowedrealms.com.au
- Launched: September 2004
- Current status: Ceased publication October 2006

Shadowed Realms was a dark flash fiction online magazine produced by Australian independent publisher Brimstone Press. A number of stories published in Shadowed Realms won, or were nominated for, several speculative fiction awards.

== Publication history ==
The first issue was published in September 2004. Issue #11 was published in October 2006 and was the last issue released prior to editor Angela Challis' announcement that the webzine was to close. Shadowed Realms is currently on hiatus until the final two issues are published.

The online magazine released two special issues during its run: Issue #6 - the Continuum 3 convention/Australian Horror Writers Association launch issue (featuring Continuum 3 guests Poppy Z Brite and Richard Harland, plus Robert Hood, Terry Dowling, and the winners of the inaugural AHWA flash fiction competition); and Issue #9 - the "Redback" themed issue (featuring nine prominent female horror/speculative fiction writers, including K J Bishop, Kaaron Warren, Deborah Biancotti, and Kirstyn McDermott.)

All Shadowed Realms issues have been electronically archived as part of the National Archives of Australia's Pandora project.

The magazine ceased publication some time in 2007.

=== Published authors ===
Shadowed Realms published many prominent Australian horror writers such as Stephen Dedman, Lee Battersby, Martin Livings, and Paul Haines, and a number of US and UK horror authors including Kurt Newton, Greg Beatty, Alistair Rennie and Eric Marin.

=== Milestones ===
Shadowed Realms was the first Australian horror webzine to be recognised by the Science Fiction and Fantasy Writers of America (SFWA) as a professional short fiction publication. Shadowed Realms was also the first electronic magazine to be nominated for the Best Collected Work. Ditmar Award

== Awards ==
=== Wins ===
- 2006 Aurealis Award, Horror short story: "Pater Familias" by Lee Battersby (Shadowed Realms #3)

=== Nominations ===
- 2007 Ditmar Award, Short Story: "Surrender 1: Rope Artist" by Deborah Biancotti (Shadowed Realms #9)
- 2007 Ditmar Award, Short Story: "Cold" by Kirstyn McDermott (Shadowed Realms #9)
- 2007 Ditmar Award, Short Story: "The Bat's Boudoir" by Kyla Ward (Shadowed Realms #9)
- 2006 Ditmar Award, Collected work: Shadowed Realms (ed. Angela Challis)
- 2006 Australian Shadows Award: "Pater Familias" by Lee Battersby (Shadowed Realms #3)
- 2005 Tin Duck Award, Professional fiction: "A Life in Art" by Adam Wieland (Shadowed Realms #1)

==== Honourable Mentions ====
- 2007 Australian Shadows Award: "Silk and Pearls" by K J Bishop (Shadowed Realms #9)
- 2006 Aurealis Award, Horror short story: "In Nomine Patris" by Martin Livings (Shadowed Realms #5)
