= Light Touch Paper, Stand Clear =

Short story anthology

Light Touch Paper, Stand Clear is a speculative fiction short story anthology edited by Edwina Harvey and Simon Petrie, and published by Peggy Bright Books in 2012. It contains thirteen original short stories, mostly by Australian writers. The anthology accrued Ditmar Award nominations for Best Collected Work, for Best Short Story ("The Bone Chime Song", by Joanne Anderton) and for Best Artwork (cover art by Les Petersen), two Chronos Award nominations for Best Short Story (for "Five Ways To Start A War", by Sue Bursztynski and "The D—d", by Adam Browne), and won a Sir Julius Vogel Award for Best Professional Artwork (cover art by Les Petersen).

== Contents ==
- "Introduction" by Edwina Harvey and Simon Petrie
- "The Bone Chime Song" by Joanne Anderton
- "Five Ways to Start a War" by Sue Bursztynski
- "History: Theory and Practice" by Dave Luckett
- "The D—d" by Adam Browne
- "The Travelling Salesman and the Farmer's Daughter" by Katherine Cummings
- "Faet's Fire" by Thoraiya Dyer
- "Murder at the Tip" by Anna Tambour
- "The Subjunctive Case" by Robert Porteous
- "Mary Had a Unicorn" by Ripley Patton
- "Between Lines" by Brenda Cooper
- "The Godbreaker and Unggubudh the Mountain" by Ian McHugh
- "Hard Cases" by Sean McMullen
- "Kindling" by Kathleen Jennings
