= The Woman of Endor =

- Short story by Sue Isle
- Country: Australia
- Language: English
- Genre: Fantasy novelette

Publication
- Published in: Orb #2
- Publication type: Periodical
- Publisher: Orb Publications
- Media type: Print (Magazine)
- Publication date: 2001

"The Woman of Endor" is a 2001 fantasy novelette by Sue Isle.

== Background ==
"The Woman of Endor" was first published in 2001 in the second edition of the Orb Speculative Fiction magazine, edited by Sarah Endacott and published by Orb Publications. It was published alongside 12 other stories by the authors Kaaron Warren, Reilly McCarron, Aidan Doyle, Tracey Rolfe, Claire McKenna, Adam Browne, Helen Patrice, Stephen Dedman, Paul Haines, Geoffrey Maloney, Andrew Tompkins, and Carolyn Scott. "The Woman of Endor" won the 2001 Aurealis Award for best fantasy short story.
