= Aurealis Award for Best Science Fiction Novella =

Australian science fiction award

Aurealis Award for best science fiction novella
- Awarded for: Excellence in fantasy fiction novels
- Country: Australia
- Presented by: Chimaera Publications, Continuum Foundation
- First award: 2015
- Currently held by: T. R. Napper
- Website: Official site

The Aurealis Awards are presented annually by the Australia-based Chimaera Publications and WASFF to published works in order to "recognise the achievements of Australian science fiction, fantasy, horror writers". To qualify, a work must have been first published by an Australian citizen or permanent resident between 1 January and 31 December of the corresponding year; the presentation ceremony is held the following year. It has grown from a small function of around 20 people to a two-day event attended by over 200 people.

Since their creation in 1995, awards have been given in various categories of speculative fiction. Categories currently include science fiction, fantasy, horror, speculative young adult fiction—with separate awards for novels and short fiction—collections, anthologies, illustrative works or graphic novels, children's books, and an award for excellence in speculative fiction. The awards have attracted the attention of publishers by setting down a benchmark in science fiction and fantasy. The continued sponsorship by publishers such as HarperCollins and Orbit has identified the award as an honour to be taken seriously.

The results are decided by a panel of judges from a list of submitted nominees; the long-list of nominees is reduced to a short-list of finalists. Ties can occur if the panel decides both entries show equal merit, however they are encouraged to choose a single winner. The judges are selected from a public application process by the Award's management team.

This article lists all the short-list nominees and winners in the best science fiction novella category. T. R. Napper holds the record for most wins (three) and most nominations (five). Sean Monaghan holds the record for most nominations without winning (four).

== Winners and nominees ==
In the following table, the years correspond to the year of the story's eligibility; the ceremonies are always held the following year. Each year links to the corresponding "year in literature" article. Entries with a blue background have won the award; those with a white background are the nominees on the short-list. If the short story was originally published in a book with other stories rather than by itself or in a magazine, the book title is included after the publisher's name.

* Winners and joint winners
* Nominees on the shortlist

Year	Author(s)	Novella	Publisher or publication	Ref
2015	Garth Nix*	"By Frogsled and Lizardback to Outcast Venusian Lepers"	Random House (Old Venus)	
2015	Jack Bridges	"Blood and Ink"	Prizm Books	
2015	Sean Monaghan	"The Molenstraat Music Festival"	Asimovs' Science Fiction	
2016	Nick T. Chan*	"Salto Mortal"	Lightspeed (#73)	
2016	Deborah Biancotti	Waking in Winter	PS Publishing	
2016	Thoraiya Dyer	"Going Viral"	Dimension6 (#8)	
2016	Rose Mulready	The Bonobo's Dream	Seizure Press	
2016	Simon Petrie	"All the Colours of the Tomato"	Dimension6 (#9)	
2016	Tansy Rayner Roberts	"Did We Break the End of the World?"	Twelfth Planet Press (Defying Doomsday)	
2017	Tansy Rayner Roberts*	Girl Reporter	(self-published)	
2017	Stephanie Gunn	"This Silent Sea"	Review of Australian Fiction (Vol 24 No 6)	
2017	Will Kostakis	"I Can See the Ending"	HarperCollins Australia (Begin, End, Begin: A #LoveOzYA Anthology)	
2017	D. K. Mok	"The Wandering Library"	Ticonderoga Publications (Ecopunk!)	
2017	Shauna O'Meara	"Island Green"	Ticonderoga Publications (Ecopunk!)	
2017	Simon Petrie	Matters Arising from the Identification of the Body	Peggy Bright Books	
2018	Stephanie Gunn*	"Pinion"	Ticonderoga Publications (Aurum)	
2018	Joanne Anderton	"I Almost Went to the Library Last Night"	Ticonderoga Publications (Aurum)	
2018	Jodi Cleghorn	The Starling Requiem	eMergent Publishing	
2018	Stephanie Gunn	Icefall	Twelfth Planet Press	
2018	Samantha Murray	"Singles' Day"	Interzone (#277)	
2018	Corey J. White	Static Ruin	Tor.com	
2019	Shauna O'Meara*	"'Scapes Made Diamond"	Interzone (#280)	
2019	Sean Monaghan	"Ventiforms"	Asimov's Science Fiction	
2019	Cat Sparks	"You Will Remember Who You Were"	Dimension6 (#16)	
2019	Marlee Jane Ward	Prisoncorp	Seizure, an imprint of Brio Books	
2020	T. R. Napper*	"The Weight of the Air, The Weight of the World"	Grimdark Magazine (Neon Leviathan)	
2020	Grace Chan	"Jigsaw Children"	Clarkesworld (#161)	
2020	Thoraiya Dyer	"Generation Gap"	Clarkesworld (#161)	
2020	Nikky Lee	"Dingo & Sister"	Andromeda Spaceways Magazine (#78)	
2021	Samantha Murray	"Preserved in Amber"	Clarkesworld (#178)	
2021	Baden Chant	"Access Denied"	Aurealis (#142)	
2021	Craig Cormick	The Cruise to the End of the World	Merino	
2021	D. K. Mok	"The Birdsong Fossil"	World Weaver Press (Multispecies Cities: Solarpunk Urban Futures)	
2021	Sean Monaghan	"Problem Landing"	Analog (March/April 2021)	
2021	T. R. Napper	"A Vast Silence"	F&SF (Nov/Dec 2021)	
2022	Amanda Cool	Resembling Lepus (WINNER)	Grey Matter Press	
2022	T. R. Napper	“The Goruden-Mairu Job”	Night, Rain, and Neon, NewCon Press	
2022	Garth Nix	“The Sisters of Saint Nicola of The Almost Perpetual Motion vs the Lurch”	Tor.com	
2022	Matthew Reilly	Cobalt Blue	Pan Macmillan	
2023	Thoraiya Dyer	“Eight or die”	Clarkesworld #206/207	
2023	Tim Hawken	Killware	Seahawk Press	
2023	Nikky Lee	Once we flew (WINNER)	self-published	
2023	A D Lyall	The last to go	Shawline Publishing Group	
2023	Garth Nix	“Showdown on planetoid Pencrux”	Asimov’s Science Fiction, July/August 2023	
2023	Kaaron Warren	Bitters	Cemetery Dance	
2024	John Birmingham & Jason Lambright	The Javan War	Gigantic Bombs Corporation	
2024	Tracy Cooper-Posey	“Captain Santiago and the Sky Dome Waitress”	Celestial Hearts	
2024	Nikky Lee	“We Who Remain”	A Night So Dark and Full of Stars	
2024	Sean Monaghan	“Daisy and Maisie, External Hull Maintenance Experts”	Analog	
2024	T. R. Napper	Ghost of the Neon God (WINNER)	Titan	
2024	Ben Peek	“Shadow Films”	Lightspeed	
2025	Cameron Cooper	Quiet Like Fire	Stories Rule Press	
2025	Callum Lewis	'Photo in the Chip'	Andromeda Spaceways Magazine #98	
2025	T R Napper	'The Hidden God' (WINNER)	Asimov's Science Fiction March/April 2025	
2025	Thomas K Slee	Homecoming	Refraction Publishing	
2025	Corey Jae White & Maddison Stoff	All My Guns are Trans and Gay and They're Ruining My Fucking Life	Patreon	

== See also ==
- Ditmar Award, an Australian science fiction award established in 1969
