= Matters Arising from the Identification of the Body =

2017 novella by Simon Petrie

Matters Arising from the Identification of the Body is a science fiction / crime novella by Simon Petrie. It was published by Peggy Bright Books in 2017.

== Plot summary ==
The novella is set on the Saturnian moon Titan. It concerns an investigation into the troubling death, by exposure to Titan's atmosphere, of a young woman, Tanja Morgenstein, the daughter of wealthy and influential industrialist Joshua Hainan. The investigation, conducted by caseworker Guerline Scarfe, begins with an evidence-supported presumption that the death was a suicide, but anomalies are uncovered as the various persons of interest in Ms Morgenstein's life are interviewed.

== Awards and nominations ==
- 2017 shortlisted Aurealis Award for Best Science Fiction Novella
- 2018 nominated Ditmar Award for Best Novella or Novelette
- 2018 winner Sir Julius Vogel Award for Best Novella or Novelette
