= Tracie McBride =

Tracie McBride may refer to:

- Tracie Joy McBride (1975–1995), victim of Murder of Tracie McBride
- Tracie McBride (writer), author, winner of Aurealis Award for Best Horror Short Story and other awards
