= A Walk-On Part in the War =

- Short story by Stephen Dedman
- Country: Australia
- Language: English
- Genres: Fantasy, short story

Publication
- Published in: Dreaming Down-Under
- Publication type: Anthology
- Publisher: Voyager Books
- Media type: Print (hardback & paperback)
- Publication date: November 1998

"A Walk-On Part in the War" is a 1998 fantasy short story by Stephen Dedman.

== Background ==
"A Walk-On Part in the War" was first published in Australia November 1998 in the Dreaming Down-Under anthology, edited by Jack Dann and Janeen Webb and published by Voyager Books. In 2004 it was republished in The Best Australian Science Fiction Writing: A Fifty Year Collection, edited by Rob Gerrand and published by Black Inc.

== Award ==
- 1998 Aurealis Award for best fantasy short story.
