= Disembodied =

Disembodied means having no material body, being immaterial incorporeal or insubstantial. The name Disembodied or The Disembodied may refer to:

- Disembodied (band), an American metalcore band
- Disembodied (Buckethead album), a 1997 album by Buckethead under the name Death Cube K
- The Disembodied (film), a 1957 science fiction horror film

== See also ==
- Immaterial (disambiguation)
