= Toother =

- Short story by Terry Dowling
- Country: Australia
- Language: English
- Genre: Horror

Publication
- Published in: Eclipse One
- Publication type: Anthology
- Publisher: Night Shade Books
- Media type: Print (Paperback)
- Publication date: October 2007

"Toother" is a 2007 horror short story by Terry Dowling.

== Background ==
"Toother" was first published in the United States in 2007 in the science fiction and fantasy anthology Eclipse One, edited by Jonathan Strahan and published by Night Shade Books. In 2008 "Toother" was republished in The Year's Best Fantasy and Horror 2008: Twenty-First Annual Collection edited by Kelly Link, Gavin J. Grant, Ellen Datlow.

"Toother" won the 2007 Australian Shadows Award beating works by Matthew Chrulew, David Conyers, Rick Kennett, Martin Livings, and Jason Nahrung. "Toother" was also a short-list nominee for the 2007 Aurealis Award for best horror short story but lost to Anna Tambour's "The Jeweller of Second-Hand Roe".
