= The Other Face of Janus =

Book by Louise Katz

- The Other Face of Janus first edition cover.
- Author: Louise Katz
- Cover artist: Lore Foye
- Language: English
- Genre: Young adult
- Publisher: Angus & Robertson
- Publication date: 2001
- Publication place: Australia
- Media type: Print (Paperback)
- Pages: 240 (first edition)
- ISBN: 978-0-207-19709-3

The Other Face of Janus is a 2001 young adult novel by Louise Katz. It follows the story of Edwina Nearly who after facing a range of problems decides to get away from it all by visiting an art gallery only to fall into a painting in which laws of physics don't apply.

== Background ==
The Other Face of Janus was first published in Australia in 2001 by Angus & Robertson in trade paperback format. In 2002 it was published as an audiobook by Louis Braille Books. The Other Face of Janus won the 2001 Aurealis Award for best young-adult novel.

== Plot summary ==
Edwina Nearly finds life difficult to handle. She is happy when she enters the painting of The Garden of Earthly Delights and meets Janus. But everything goes wrong when Janus decides to visit her world and gets out of the painting. There he becomes a monster, and it is Edwina's responsibility to lure him back into the Garden.
