= Francis Payne (author) =

Australian writer

- Born: 1953 (age 72–73); Scotland
- Writing career
- Genre: Speculative fiction

Francis Payne (born 1953) is an Australian writer of speculative fiction.

== Biography ==
Payne was born in 1953 in Scotland. In 1967 Payne emigrated to Australia. Payne won his first award in 1978 with his work "Albert's Bellyful" which won the Ditmar Award for best Australian short fiction. In 1995 he won the Aurealis Award for best horror short story with his chapbook "Olympia". Payne has a wife and child and is currently living outside Melbourne, Victoria, Australia.

== Awards and nominations ==
Year	Award	Work	Category	Result
1978	Ditmar Award	"Albert's Bellyful"	Best Australian short fiction	Won
1995	Aurealis Award	"Olympia"	Best horror short story	Won

== Bibliography ==
=== Short fiction ===
- "Albert's Bellyful" (1977) in Yggdrasil February 1977
- "What the Stone of Ciparri Says" (1995) in Bloodsongs #6 (ed. Steve Proposch)
- "Olympia" (1995)
