= Use Only As Directed =

Anthology of Australian science fiction

First edition, cover art by Lewis Morley

Use Only As Directed is a speculative fiction short story anthology edited by Simon Petrie and Edwina Harvey, and published by Peggy Bright Books in 2014. The book features fourteen short stories by Australian and New Zealand speculative fiction writers. The anthology's opening story, 'Dellinger' by Charlotte Nash, was shortlisted for the Aurealis Award for Best Science Fiction Short Story.

== Contents ==
- "Introduction" by Simon Petrie and Edwina Harvey
- "Dellinger" by Charlotte Nash
- "The Blue Djinn's Wish" by Leife Shallcross
- "The Kind Neighbours of Hell" by Alex Isle
- "Mister Lucky" by Ian Nichols
- "Home Sick" by M. Darusha Wehm
- "Always Falling Up" by Grant Stone
- "Yard" by Claire McKenna
- "Never More" by Dave Freer
- "Fetch Me Down My Gun" by Lyn McConchie
- "Uncle Darwin's Bazooka" by Douglas A. Van Belle
- "The Climbing Tree" by Michelle Goldsmith
- "Large Friendly Letters" by Stephen Dedman
- "Future Perfect" by Janeen Webb
- "The Eighth Day" by Dirk Flinthart
