= Karen Lee Field =

English born Australian novelist

- Born: 1961 (age 64–65); London, England
- Occupations: Writer and Administrator
- Writing career
- Genres: Fantasy, children's books, Dark Fiction
- Website: www.karenleefield.com

Karen Lee Field (born 1961) is an author of fantasy novels for younger readers, 9- to 12-year-olds, as well as adults. She also writes short fiction.

Born in the UK, Field moved to Australia with her parents in 1969 and settled in Sydney. In 2009 she moved to the Blue Mountains in New South Wales. She works part-time for the Australian Government, which pays the bills and allows her more time to pursue her writing career. In 2010 she founded her own business, Kayelle Press. However, the business was shut down in 2016 due to a death in the family and having to care for her mother, who had Alzheimer's disease.

== Bibliography ==
=== Novels ===
- 2018 Domino Effect: A Dark Novel (ebook)

=== Middle Grade Books ===
==== Cat and Mouse Adventures ====
- TBA The House on the Hill (trade paperback) and (ebook)

==== The Land of Miu Series ====
- 3 May 2015 The Land of Miu (The Land of Miu, #1, 3rd Ed.) (ebook)
- 22 May 2015 The King's Riddle (The Land of Miu, #2, 2nd Ed.) (ebook)
- 1 June 2018 The Lion Gods (The Land of Miu, #3) (ebook)

===== Forthcoming =====
- Whispering Caves - a fantasy novel for adults

==== Out of Print ====
- 2010 Cat's Eyes (Land of Miu, #1) (Kayelle Press, December 2010)
- 25 Nov 2011 The Land of Miu (2nd Edition, Land of Miu, #1) – originally published with the title "Cat's Eyes"
- 25 Jan 2012 The King's Riddle (Land of Miu, #2) (Kayelle Press, 2011)

=== Short stories ===
- Where Strength Lies (Speculative Realms, July 2008)
- Amunet's Gift (100 Stories for Queensland, eMergent Publishing, May 2011)
- Boundaries (Hope Anthology, Kayelle Press, October 2011)

==== Forthcoming ====
None at present

=== Articles ===
- To Assess or Not to Assess, That is the Question (The Scriptorium, June 2003)
