= Paul Haines (fiction writer) =

New Zealand-born writer

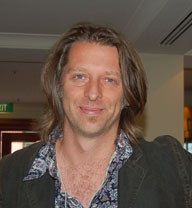
- Haines in 2007
- Born: 8 June 1970; New Zealand
- Died: 5 March 2012 (aged 41); Victoria, Australia
- Occupations: Writer; IT consultant
- Writing career
- Period: 1999 to 2012
- Genres: Horror fiction Speculative fiction
- Website: paulhaines.com

Paul Haines (8 June 1970 – 5 March 2012) was a New Zealand-born horror and speculative fiction writer. He lived in Melbourne with his wife and daughter.

Raised in Auckland, New Zealand, Haines moved to Australia in the 1990s after completing a university degree in Otago, where he became an Information Technology consultant. He attended the inaugural Clarion South writers workshop in 2004 and was a member of the SuperNOVA writers group. Haines had more than thirty short stories published in Australia, North America, and Greece. In 2007, he volunteered as a mentor for the Australian Horror Writers Association.

Haines won the Australian Ditmar Award three times (Best New Talent in 2005, and Best novella/novelette for "The Last Days of Kali Yuga" (2005) and "The Devil in Mr Pussy (Or How I Found God Inside My Wife)" (2007)). He won the 2004 Aurealis Award (horror short story) for "The Last Days of Kali Yuga" and was nominated for the Pushcart Prize in 2003 and 2004. Several of his short stories received Honourable Mentions in the annual Year's Best Fantasy and Horror anthologies, ed. Ellen Datlow, Gavin Grant, and Kelly Link (St. Martins).

Haines' first short story collection Doorways for the Dispossessed was published by Prime Books in 2006. It won the New Zealand 2008 Sir Julius Vogel Award for Best Collection and was nominated for the 2007 Australian Ditmar for Best Collection.

In 2007 Haines was diagnosed with cancer. The anthology Scary Food: A Compendium of Gastronomic Atrocity (ed. Cat Sparks, Agog! Press, 2008) was put together as part of a donation drive to raise funds to partially cover the cost of Haines' medical treatment. Authors represented include Kaaron Warren, Margo Lanagan, Robert Hood, Richard Harland, Paul Haines, Terry Dowling, Stephen Dedman, Deborah Biancotti, Lee Battersby, Lucy Sussex, Gillian Polack, Lourdes Ndaira and Anna Tambour. Haines died in March 2012.

He was influenced by Iain Banks, Clive Barker, James Herbert, Stephen King, George R. R. Martin, Robert Silverberg, Peter Straub, and Irvine Welsh.

== Critical acclaim ==
In praise of Haines' writing, Simon Petrie wrote "The danger of reading Haines’ stories in this vein is that the reader can come perilously close to accepting cannibalism, sexual sadism, or any of a myriad other vices as representing innately reasonable behaviour – because, in the context of Haines’ stories, this is very much the category such activity falls into. If iniquity needs a poster child (and I'm not sure, in this day and age, that it does), then the protagonist in stories such as “Slice of Life” will do just nicely, thank you."

R.J. Burgess wrote "Take a slab of Hunter S. Thompson, add some Philip K. Dick, and throw them into a blender for a while. Add a little dash of Brother's Grimm and a spoonful of American Psycho and what do you end up with? In all honesty, probably a great galumphing mess, but if anyone could come close to making such a bizarre union of styles and genres work then it's this man—Paul Haines—a young, up-and-coming author from down under."

Tim Lieder writes that Paul Haines parodied both Disney cartoons and desperate living stories, comparing him favorably to Hubert Selby Jr. and William Kennedy.

== Death ==
Paul Haines, 41, died on March 5, 2012, in Melbourne, Australia of cancer. He was survived by his wife and daughter.

== Bibliography ==
=== Collections ===
- The Last Days of Kali Yuga (Brimstone Press, 2011)
- Slice of Life (The Mayne Press, 2009)
- Doorways for the Dispossessed (Prime Books, 2006)

=== Short stories ===
- "The Garden of Jahal'Adin", Orb No. 2 (2001)
- "Yum Cha", Antipodean SF No. 48 (2002)
  FlashSpec No. 1 (2006)
- "The Skin Polis", Fables & Reflections No. 3 (2002)
- "Doorways for the Dispossessed", Agog! Fantastic Fiction (2002)
- "Slice of Life", Dark Animus No. 2 (2002)
- "Shot in Loralai", NFG 1 (2003)
- "www.rebirth.!@$", Ideomancer (2003)
- "The Feastive Season", NFG No. 2 (2003)
- "Cooking for the Heart", Lullaby Hearse No. 4 (2003)
- "The Last Days of Kali Yuga", NFG No. 4 (2004)
- "Jealousy", NFG No. 4 (2004)
- "The Gift of Hindsight", Aurealis No. 32 (2004)
- "The Punjab's Gift", StoryHouse (2004)
- "Hamlyn", Andromeda Spaceways Inflight Magazine No. 11, (2004)
- "This Is The End, Harry, Goodnight!", NFG No. 5 (2004)
- "They Say It's Other People", Agog! Smashing Stories (2004)
- "Warchalking" (with Claire McKenna), Agog! Smashing Stories (2004)
- "The War Against Ignorance", Right Hand Pointing Left No. 1, 2004)
- "Doof Doof Doof", Dark Animus No. 7 (2005)
  Teddy Bear Cannibal Massacre (2005)
- "The Light in Autumn's Leaves", Borderlands No. 5 (2005)
- "Malik Rising", Shadowed Realms (2005)
  Australian Dark Fantasy & Horror 2006 edition (2006)
- "The Devil in Mr Pussy (Or How I Found God Inside My Wife)", c0ck (2006)
- "Father Father", c0ck (2006)
  Australian Dark Fantasy & Horror 2007 edition (2006)
- "Lifelike and Josephine", Agog! Ripping Reads (2006)
- "Going Down With Jennifer Aniston's Breasts", Ripples No. 5 (2006)
- "Mnemophonic", Doorways for the Dispossessed (2006)
- "Burning from the Inside", Doorways for the Dispossessed (2006)
- "Where Is Brisbane And How Do I Get There?", Fantastical Journeys to Brisbane (2007)
- "Inducing", Orb #7 (2007)
- "Necromancing The Bones", Dark Animus #10/11 (2007)
- "The Festival of Colour", GUD #2 (2008)
  Aurealis #40 (2008)
- "Her Collection of Intimacy", Black: Australian Dark Culture Magazine No. 2 (2008)
- "Wives", X6 (Coeur De Lion, 2009)
- "Slice of Life – A Spot of Liver", Slice of Life, (2009)
- "High Tide at Hot Water Beach", Hope Anthology (Kayelle Press, 2011)

== Awards ==
=== Wins ===
- 2011 Chronos Award, Best Short Fiction: "Her Gallant Needs"
- 2011 Sir Julius Vogel Award, Best Short Story: "High Tide At Hot Water Beach"
- 2011 Sir Julius Vogel Award, Best Novella: "A Tale Of The Interferers: Hunger For Forbidden Flesh"
- 2010 Ditmar, Best Novella: "Wives"
- 2010 Sir Julius Vogel Award, Best Novella: "Wives"
- 2010 Ditmar, Best Collection: Slice Of Life
- 2010 Chronos Award, Best Collection: Slice Of Life
- 2009 Aurealis Award, Best Horror Short Story TIE: "Wives"
- 2009 Aurealis Award, Best Horror Short Story TIE: "Slice of Life – A Spot of Liver"
- 2008 Sir Julius Vogel Award, Collection: Doorways For The Dispossessed
- 2007 Ditmar Award, Novella/novelette: "The Devil In Mr Pussy (Or How I Found God Inside My Wife)"
- 2005 Ditmar Award, Novella/novelette: "The Last Days of Kali Yuga"
- 2005 Ditmar Award, Best New Talent
- 2004 Aurealis Award, Horror short story: "The Last Days of Kali Yuga"

=== Nominations ===
- 2012 Aurealis Award, Collection: "The Last Days of Kali Yuga"
- 2012 Aurealis Award, Horror Short story: "The Past is a Bridge Best Left Burnt"
- 2011 Sir Julius Vogel Award, Short Story "I've Seen The Man"
- 2011 Sir Julius Vogel Award, Novella: "Her Gallant Needs"
- 2011 Ditmar Award, Novella/novelette: "Her Gallant Needs"
- 2010 Aurealis Award, Horror Short Story: "Her Gallant Needs"
- 2010 Sir Julius Vogel Award, Collection: "Slice of Life"
- 2010 Sir Julius Vogel Award, Short Story: "Slice of Life – A Spot of Liver"
- 2009 James Tiptree Jr Honours List: "Wives"
- 2009 Aurealis Award, Best Collection: Slice Of Life
- 2008 Chronos Award, Short story: "Her Collection of Intimacy"
- 2008 Chronos Award, Short story: "Failed Experiments From The Frontier: The Pumpkin"
- 2009 Sir Julius Vogel Award, Novella/novelette: "A Tale of The Interferers: Necromancing The Bones"
- 2009 Ditmar Award, Short story: "Her Collection of Intimacy"
- 2009 Australian Shadows Award: "Her Collection of Intimacy"
- 2008 Ditmar Award, Novella/novelette: "Where Is Brisbane And How Many Times Do I Get There?"
- 2007 Ditmar Award, Collection: Doorways For The Dispossessed
- 2007 Ditmar Award, Short story: "Burning From The Inside"
- 2007 Sir Julius Vogel Award, Short story: "Burning From The Inside"
- 2007 Sir Julius Vogel Award, Short story: "Mnemophonic"
- 2005 Aurealis Award, Horror short story: "Doof Doof Doof"
- 2004 Aurealis Award, Fantasy short story: "The Gift Of Hindsight"

=== Highly commended ===
- 2005 Aurealis Award, Horror short story: "The Light In Autumn's Leaves"
- 2004 Aurealis Award, Horror short story: "They Say It's Other People"

== Reviews ==
- Review of Slice Of Life on The Specusphere
- Review of Slice Of Life on Scary Minds
- Review of Slice Of Life on HorrorScope
- Review of Doorways for the Dispossessed on HorrorScope
- Review of Doorways for the Dispossessed on Strange Horizons
- Review of Doorways for the Dispossessed in Ticonderoga Online issue #10
- Reviews of Haines' work on ASif!
