= Immaterial =

Immaterial may refer to:

- The opposite of matter, material, materialism, or materialistic
- Maya (illusion), a concept in all Indian religions, that all matter is a grand illusion
- Incorporeality
- Immaterialism, including subjective idealism (and other idealism/mentalism/spiritualism)
- Immaterial financial matters, in accounting and auditing terms
- Immaterial (collection), a 2002 short story collection by Robert Hood
- Immaterial labor
- It's Immaterial, British pop music band
- "Immaterial" (song), by Sophie from Oil of Every Pearl's Un-Insides (2018)
