= Corpselight =

2017 book by Angela Slatter

- Author: Angela Slatter
- Language: English
- Series: Verity Fassbinder
- Genre: Urban fantasy
- Publisher: Jo Fletcher Books
- Publication date: July 11, 2017
- Publication place: Australia
- Pages: 400
- ISBN: 9781784294342
- Preceded by: Vigil

Corpselight is a 2017 urban fantasy novel by Angela Slatter. It is the sequel to Vigil, and the second installment in the Verity Fassbinder series.

== Synopsis ==
Half-human, half-Weyrd detective Verity has become pregnant with her partner David, and must deal with both an investigation into mysterious Weyrd-caused drownings while preparing for the arrival of their daughter.

== Reception ==
The book received mixed reviews from critics, who praised the story but described the characterization of Verity and David as flat. M.L. Clark of Strange Horizons wrote that the book was "proudly Australian and eloquently told" but that Verity was not given enough opportunity for depth or self-reflection, and was less relatable as a result. In a review for the British Fantasy Society, Matthew Johns compared the novel to Jim Butcher's The Dresden Files, which also features a protagonist investigating fantasy phenomena.

It was nominated for the 2018 Ditmar Award for Best Novel, but lost to Thoraiya Dyer's Crossroads of Canopy.
