= Vigil (novel) =

2016 book by Angela Slatter

- Author: Angela Slatter
- Language: English
- Series: Verity Fassbinder
- Genre: Urban fantasy
- Publisher: Jo Fletcher Books
- Publication date: July 7, 2016
- Publication place: Australia
- ISBN: 9781784294021
- Followed by: Corpselight

Vigil is a 2016 urban fantasy novel by Angela Slatter. It is the first novel in the Verity Fassbinder series.

== Synopsis ==
The series is set in an alternate Brisbane in which Weyrds, magical beings from European and Judeo-Christian mythology, live alongside normal humans. Verity Fassbinder is half human, half Weyrd and uneasily moves between their spheres as a detective who investigates supernatural cases. Her father was a Kinderfresser who consumed human children, while her mother was an ordinary human.

== Reception ==
The book received mixed to positive reviews from critics. Rjurik Davidson of The Sydney Morning Herald wrote that "Slatter handles the interaction of the modern digital world with the lost world of myth with considerable control", but felt that the portrayal of Brisbane was not as localized as it could be.

Duncan Lawrie, writing for Vector, praised the book's setting, plot and use of mythology, while commenting that it would have benefited from more editing. Lawrie noted that Verity's status as a human/Weyrd hybrid allowed Slatter to explore themes of alienation and the immigrant experience.

It was nominated for a Ditmar Award and Aurealis Award.
