= Wheatland Press =

American independent book publisher

- Status: On hiatus
- Founded: 2002
- Founder: Deborah Layne
- Country of origin: United States
- Headquarters location: Wilsonville, Oregon
- Publication types: Books
- Fiction genres: science fiction, fantasy, and horror
- Official website: www.wheatlandpress.com

Wheatland Press is an independent book publisher, specializing in science fiction, fantasy, and horror short story and poetry collections. It was founded in 2002 by Deborah Layne. Although the number of books it produced tailed off significantly in 2006, Wheatland Press has published some remarkable work in a very short time, including works by Ben Peek, Bruce Holland Rogers, Lucius Shepard, Steven Utley, Jerry Oltion, and Howard Waldrop. The Press's series of original anthologies, Polyphony, has consistently ranked among the best in the field.

On January 29, 2009, Layne announced the press was going on hiatus.
