= Dead of Winter (short story) =

- Short story by Stephen Dedman
- Country: Australia
- Language: English
- Genre: Horror

Publication
- Published in: Weird Tales March–April 2006
- Publication type: Periodical
- Publisher: Wildside Press
- Media type: Print (Magazine)
- Publication date: March 2006

"Dead of Winter" is a 2006 horror short story by Stephen Dedman.

== Background ==
"Dead of Winter" was first published in the United States in 2006 in the March–April edition of horror and fantasy magazine Weird Tales, edited by George H. Scithers, Darrell Schweitzer, John Gregory Betancourt and published by Wildside Press. "Dead of Winter" won the 2006 Aurealis Award for best horror short story, beating works by Kaaron Warren, Chris Lawson, and Margo Lanagan.
