= The Black Crusade =

Book by Richard Harland

- The Black Crusade first edition cover.
- Author: Richard Harland
- Cover artist: Kerri Valkova
- Language: English
- Genre: Horror
- Publisher: Chimaera Publications
- Publication date: January 2004
- Publication place: Australia
- Media type: Print (Paperback)
- Pages: 217 pp (first edition)
- ISBN: 0-9752143-0-6
- Preceded by: The Vicar of Morbing Vyle

The Black Crusade is a 2004 horror novel by Richard Harland. It is a prequel to Harland's earlier novel The Vicar of Morbing Vyle. It describes the journey of the hapless Basil Smorta, a multilingual bank clerk, who is forced into the company of a group of "fundamental Darwinists" by their imprisonment of the object of his undying love, Australian singer, Volusia, in a mobile iron box. The group travel across Eastern Europe during 1894, and encounter ghosts, blood donating vampires and other comic horror curiosities.

== Background ==
The Black Crusade was first published in Australia in January 2004 by Chimaera Publications in trade paperback format. It won the 2004 Aurealis Award for best horror novel and the 2004 Golden Aurealis for best novel.
