= Ian Whates =

British speculative fiction author

Ian Whates is a British speculative fiction author and editor. In 2006 he launched the independent publishing house NewCon Press. He lives with his partner Helen in Cambridgeshire.

As of 2009 Whates is currently a director of both the Science Fiction Writers of America (SFWA) and the British Science Fiction Association (BSFA). He has had short fiction published in Nature, Hub and TQR. In 2007 his short story The Gift of Joy was nominated for the British Science Fiction Award. His space opera novel, Pelquin's Comet (The Dark Angels Book 1), was published in 2015.

== Bibliography ==
=== City of a Hundred Rows ===
1. City of Dreams & Nightmare (2010)
2. City of Hope & Despair (2011)
3. City of Light & Shadow (2012)

=== Noise ===
1. The Noise Within (2010)
2. The Noise Revealed (2011)

=== The Dark Angels ===
1. Pelquin's Comet (2015)
2. The Ion Raiders (2017)
3. Dark Angels Rising (2020)

=== Collections ===
- The Gift of Joy (2009)

=== Short stories and essays ===
- The Gun published in Speculative Realms Anthology, 2008; ebook re-released by Kayelle Press in 2013
- In Praise of Short Stories by Ian Whates published in Story Behind the Book : Volume 1, 2013;
- Return to Arden Falls in the 2013's "Legends", a collection of short stories in honor of David Gemmell.

=== As editor ===
- Solaris Rising (2011)
- Solaris Rising 1.5 (2012)
- Solaris Rising 2 (2013)
- Solaris Rising 3
- Legends: Stories in Honour of David Gemmell (2013)
- Legends II: Stories in Honour of David Gemmell (2015)
