= Angela Slatter =

Australian writer (born 1967)

- Born: 1967 (age 58–59); Australia
- Writing career
- Genre: Speculative fiction
- Notable works: Sourdough and Other Stories; The Girl with No Hands and Other Tales
- Notable awards: Ditmar Award 2010 The Piece of Ice in Ms Windermere's Heart; Aurealis Award 2010 The Girl With No Hands and Other Tales; Aurealis Award 2010 The February Dragon; British Fantasy Award 2012 The Coffin Maker's Daughter
- Website: angelaslatter.com

Angela Slatter (born 1967) is a writer based in Brisbane, Australia. Primarily working in the field of speculative fiction, she has focused on short stories since deciding to pursue writing in 2005, when she undertook a Graduate Diploma in Creative Writing. Since then she has written a number of short stories, many of which were included in her two compilations, Sourdough and Other Stories (2010) and The Girl with No Hands and Other Tales (2010).

== Education ==
Slatter is a graduate of Clarion South 2009 and the Tin House Summer Writers Workshop 2006. She has an MA and a PhD in creative writing. In 2013 she was awarded one of the inaugural Queensland Writers Fellowships.

Slatter occasionally teaches creative writing at the Queensland University of Technology.

== Writing ==
Angela Slatter's short stories have appeared in anthologies and journals in Australia and internationally. Her work has been listed as an honourable mention by Ellen Datlow, Gavin Grant and Kelly Link in their Year's Best Fantasy and Horror. She has been nominated three times for the Aurealis Award for Best Fantasy Short Story. Along with the Aurealis Awards, Slatter has been nominated for the Ditmar Award on two occasions: as Best New Talent in 2008, and for Best Short Story in 2010.

In 2010, Slatter published two short story collections: Sourdough and Other Stories with Tartarus Press (UK) which received a starred review at Publishers Weekly, and The Girl with No Hands and Other Tales (Ticonderoga Publications).

In 2016, her first solo full-length novel Vigil was released.

== Reception ==
Slatter's works have been well received. She received praise from Publishers Weekly for her "evocative and poetic prose" in Sourdough and Other Stories, and Jeff VanderMeer described her writing as "brilliant, muscular, and original". In particular, Slatter has received critical acclaim for her fairytale retellings.

Her individual short stories have also been highlighted by reviewers. In particular, her story "The Jacaranda Wife" was noted as one of the best stories in Jack Dann's Dreaming Again anthology by The Australian, as well as being praised by The Cairns Post and The Sydney Morning Herald, who wrote: "Angela Slatter's haunting The Jacaranda Wife, set in colonial Australia, seems to build towards a climax truly sinister, yet instead leaves you with beautiful imagery that is as otherworldly as it is strangely touching." Similarly, Scoop Magazine described her collaborative story, "The February Dragon" (with Lisa L. Hannett), as being a "highlight" of Scary Kisses, edited by Liz Grzyb.

Her first collection, The Girl with No Hands and Other Tales, was a finalist for the 2010 Australian Shadows Award for Long Fiction, and her story "Brisneyland by Night" was a finalist for Short Fiction.

Slatter was the subject of a feature in Issue 21 of Black Static, which had her photograph on the cover. Its review of Sourdough and Other Stories states: "The effect is almost as if Quentin Tarantino had decided to write fairy stories instead of scripting Pulp Fiction." (page 44)

In May 2011, Slatter was the winner of 2010 Aurealis Award for Best Collection with The Girl with No Hands and Other Taes and for Best Fantasy Short Story with "The February Dragon" (co-written with Lisa L. Hannett). The latter award was jointly awarded to Thoraiya Dyer for Yowie.

Her collection Sourdough and Other Stories was a finalist for the World Fantasy Award—Collection in 2011.

Kim Wilkins cites Slatter as a science fiction author of note in the chapter "Genre in Speculative Fiction" of the Cambridge Companion to Creative Writing (2012).

Slatter was awarded the British Fantasy Award in 2012 for her short story "The Coffin-Maker's Daughter".

Her collection The Bitterwood Bible and Other Recountings was co-winner of the World Fantasy Award—Collection in 2015.

The Path of Thorns won the 2022 Aurealis Award for Best Fantasy Novel and the Australian Shadows Award for Best Novel.

== Publications ==
=== Verity Fassbinder series, as Angela Slatter[[ ===
1. Vigil (2016), Jo Fletcher Books. ISBN 978-1-78429-402-1
2. Corpselight (2017), Jo Fletcher Books. ISBN 978-1-78429-434-2
3. Restoration (2018), Jo Fletcher Books. ISBN 978-1-78429-437-3

=== Other novels, as A. G. Slatter ===
- All the Murmuring Bones (2021), Titan Books. ISBN 9781789094343
- The Path of Thorns (2022), Titan Books. ISBN 9781789094374
- The Briar Book of the Dead (2024), Titan Books. ISBN 9781803364544
- The Crimson Road (2025), Titan Books. ISBN 9781803364575
- A Forest, Darkly (2026), Titan Books. ISBN 9781835412572

=== Collections ===
- Sourdough and Other Stories (2010), Tartarus Press. ISBN 978-1-90578-425-7
- The Girl with No Hands and Other Tales (2010), Ticonderoga Publications. ISBN 978-0-980628-87-6
- Midnight and Moonshine (2012), with Lisa L. Hannett, Ticonderoga Publications. ISBN 978-1921857300
- The Bitterwood Bible and Other Recountings (2014), Tartarus Press. ISBN 9781905784653
- Black-Winged Angels (2014). Ticonderoga Publications. ISBN 9781921857546
- The Female Factory (2014), with Lisa L. Hannett, Twelfth Planet Press. ISBN 9781922101150
- The Heart Is a Mirror for Sinners and Other Stories (2020), PS Publishing. ISBN 978-1-786365-62-0
- The Tallow-Wife and Other Tales (2021), Tartarus Press. ISBN 978-1912586240

=== Short stories ===
==== In anthologies ====
- "The Curious Case of Physically-Manifested Bedsheet Mania & Other Tales", co-authored with Lisa Hannett, in Jeff VanderMeer's and Ann VanderMeer's Steampunk II: Steampunk Reloaded, Tachyon Publications, 2010.
- "Genevieve and the Dragon", Worlds Next Door, 2010.
- "The February Dragon", co-authored with Lisa L. Hannett, Scary Kisses, 2010.
- "Brisneyland by Night", Sprawl, 2010.
- "Sister, Sister", Strange Tales III, 2009.
- "Light as Mist, Heavy as Hope", Needles & Bones, 2009.
- "The Piece of Ice in Miss Windermere's Heart", New Ceres Nights, 2009.
- "The Jacaranda Wife", Dreaming Again edited by Jack Dann (HarperCollins), 2008.
- "I Love You Like Water", 2012.
- "The Nun's Tale", Canterbury 2100, 2008.
- "Sourdough", Strange Tales II, 2007.
- "Lavinia's Wood", She Walks in Shadows, 2015 (ed. Silvia Moreno-Garcia)
- "Funhouse", The Thirteenth Floor Anthology, Rebellion 2026 (ed. Guy Adams)

==== In magazines and journals ====
- Of Sorrow and Such, Tor.Com Novella, 2015
- "The Chrysanthemum Bride", Fantasy Magazine, December 2009
- "Words", The Lifted Brow # 5, June 2009 issue
- "Frozen", Mort Castle's Doorways Magazine, Issue 8, April 2009
- "The Girl with No Hands", Lady Churchill's Rosebud Wristlet No. 23, 2008
- "Dresses, three", Shimmer 2008
- "The Hummingbird Heart", Shimmer 2008
- "Skin", The Lifted Brow #3
- "Little Radish", Crimson Highway
- "Pressina's Daughters", Winter 2007/2008, issue No. 71 of ONSPEC: The Canadian Magazine of the Fantastic.
- "The Danger of Warmth", Crimson Highway 2007.
- "Cedar Splinters", Artworker Magazine, October 2007.
- "The Little Match Girl", Shimmer #3, 2006.
- "Bluebeard", Shimmer #4, 2006.
- "The Angel Wood", Shimmer #5, 2006.
- "The Juniper Tree", Lady Churchill's Rosebud Wristlet #18, 2006.
- "Red Skein", Walking Bones Magazine, 2006.

==== Flash fiction ====
- "Inheritance", The Daily Cabal, June 2009.
- "Brisneyland by Night – Part Four", The Daily Cabal, June 2009.
- "Aeaea Street", The Daily Cabal, May 2009.
- "Lantern", The Daily Cabal, May 2009.
- "Brisneyland by Night – Part Three", The Daily Cabal, May 2009.
- "Brisneyland by Night – Part Two", The Daily Cabal, April 2009.
- "The Impatient Dead", The Daily Cabal, April 2009.
- "Hermione's Farewell", The Daily Cabal, April 2009.
- "Red New Day", The Daily Cabal, March 2009.
- "Foundation", The Daily Cabal, February 2009.
- "Beggar-maid", The Daily Cabal, January 2009.
- "Sunday Drivers", The Daily Cabal, October 2008.
- "Things Best Left Alone", The Daily Cabal, October 2008.
- "Seek", The Daily Cabal, November 2008.
- "Brisneyland by Night", The Daily Cabal, December 2008.
- "The Problem of Thorns", The Daily Cabal, December 2008.
- "Binoorie", The Daily Cabal, December 2008.
- "Little Green Apples", Microfiction in Antipodean SF, issue 110
- "Crush", Microfiction in Antipodean SF, issue 103
- "Swept Off Her Feet", Microfiction in Antipodean SF, issue 74
- "Mating Season", Microfiction in Antipodean SF, issue 72
- "Shades and Shadows", Microfiction in Antipodean SF, issue 71
- "The Halite Chronicles", Microfiction in Antipodean SF, issue 70
- "Midnight Swim", Microfiction in Antipodean SF, issue 69
- "Icon of the Underworld", Microfiction in Antipodean SF, issue 67

==== Articles ====
- "Finding a Literary Agent: The Ugly Truth", in The Australian Writer's Marketplace, 11th edition, 2011/12, August 2010.
- "Getting Published: The Good, the Bad and the Ugly", feature article with Katherine Lyall-Watson, November 2008 issue of Writing Queensland.
- "To Review or Not to Review", feature article, October 2007 issue of Writing Queensland.
- "Zen and the Art of PhD Maintenance", Issue 4 of The Definite Article, October 2007.
- "Little Red Riding Hood: Life off the Path", Apex Science Fiction and Horror Digest, Volume 1, Issue 12, 2008.
- "Tin House: What I Did on My Summer Vacation", feature article, October 2006 issue of Writing Queensland.
- "Postcard from Tin House", June 2006 issue of Writing Queensland.
- "Kim Wilkins: Brisbane Gothic", Feature Article in Antipodean SF, issue 75
