= Stephen Dedman =

Australian writer (born 1959)

- Born: 27 June 1959 (age 67); Adelaide, South Australia
- Occupation: Writer
- Writing career
- Period: 1977 to present
- Genres: Science fiction; dark fantasy
- Website: stephendedman.com

Stephen Dedman (born 1959) is an Australian writer of dark fantasy and science fiction stories and novels.

== Biography ==
Dedman's short stories have appeared in Year's Best Fantasy and Horror, Year's Best SF, and The Best Australian Science Fiction Writing: A Fifty Year Collection.

Contributing as a story editor, Dedman is also one of the team members behind Borderlands, a tri-annual Australian science fiction, fantasy and horror magazine published between 2003-2009 from Perth, Western Australia.

In 2007, he contributed to the Doctor Who short-story collection, Short Trips: Destination Prague.

== Bibliography ==
=== Novels ===
- The Art of Arrow-Cutting (Tor Books, 1997)
- Shadows Bite (Tor, 2001) (sequel to The Art of Arrow-Cutting)
- Foreign Bodies (Tor, 1999)
- Shadowrun: A Fistful of Data (ROC, 2006).
- Shadowrun: For a Few Nuyen More (Catalyst Game Labs) 2021

=== Story collections ===
- The Lady of Situations (Ticonderoga Publications, 1999)
- Never Seen By Waking Eyes (Prime, 2005)
- Charm, Strangeness, Mass and Spin (Norstrilia Press, 2022)

=== Anthology contributions ===
- Black Box e-anthology (Brimstone Press, 2008)

=== Non-fiction works ===
- Bone Hunters: On the Trail of the Dinosaurs (Omnibus, 1998)
- May the Armed Forces Be With You: The Relationship Between Science Fiction and the United States Military (McFarland) 2016

=== Chapbooks ===
- The Dirty Little Unicorn (Self-published, 1987)

=== Short stories ===
- "The Lady of Situations" (1994) in Little Deaths (ed. Ellen Datlow)
- "Never Seen by Waking Eyes" (1996) in F&SF (ed. Kristine Kathryn Rusch)
- "Schrödinger's catalyst". F&SF. 93 (6). December 1997.
- "A Walk-On Part in the War" (1998) in Dreaming Down-Under (ed. Jack Dann and Janeen Webb)
- "Honest Ghosts" (1999) in Gothic.net July 1999
- "A Sentiment Open to Doubt" (2000) in Ticonderoga Online May 2000
- "Probable Cause" (2001) in Orb Speculative Fiction No. 2 (ed. Sarah Endacott)
- "Wastelands" (2002) in Agog! Fantastic Fiction
- "Madly" (2003) in Southern Blood: New Australian Tales of the Supernatural (ed. Bill Congreve)
- "The Wind Shall Blow For Ever Mair" (2003) in Gathering the Bones (ed. Ramsey Campbell, Jack Dann, Dennis Etchison)
- "Twilight of the Idols" (2004) in Conqueror Fantastic (ed. Pamela Sargent)
- "Dead of Winter" (2006) in Weird Tales March–April 2006 (ed. George H. Scithers, Darrell Schweitzer, John Gregory Betancourt)
- "Sleep no more". Andromeda Spaceways Inflight Magazine. 41: 12–22. 2009.
- "Empathy" (2008) in Exotic Gothic 2 (ed. Danel Olson)
- "Wetwork" (2010) in Spells & Chrome (ed. Roc Books)
- "Fall" (May 2012) in Exotic Gothic 4 (ed. Danel Olson)
- "Large Friendly Letters" (2014) in Use Only As Directed (ed. Simon Petrie, Edwina Harvey)
- "From Whom All Blessings Flow" Asimov's April 1995

=== Works edited ===
- Consensual (co-edited)
- Consensual: the Second Coming (co-edited)
- Consensual a trois. (co-edited)
- Borderlands Magazine

== Awards ==
The Art of Arrow-Cutting was nominated for a Bram Stoker Award in the category of Best First Novel. In 1998 Dedman's "A Walk-On Part in the War" won the 1998 Aurealis Award for best fantasy short story. In 2001 "The Devotee" tied for the win with Terry Dowling's "The Saltimbanques" of the 2001 Ditmar Award for best short story. "Dead of Winter" won the 2006 Aurealis Award for best horror short story. Dedman has also received over 30 nominations for his work in awards such as the Aurealis Awards, Ditmar Awards, Gaylactic Spectrum Awards, the Bram Stoker Awards, and the Locus Awards.
