= Alex Isle =

Australian author (born 1963)

Alex Isle is an Australian author. He writes both novels and short stories in the science fiction/fantasy genre, as well as books and articles of nonfiction, for both adult and young adult audiences.

In 2014 Isle changed his name from Susan to Alex to reflect a gender identity change and adopted the male pronouns. Publications before 2014 are under the name Sue Isle.

Isle's books include the young adult novel Scale of Dragon, Tooth of Wolf (1996), about a rebellious teen in an alternate world 16th century joining a group of sorceresses, and nonfiction children's book Wolf Children (1998), as well as a collection of post-apocalyptic stories set in Perth, Nightsiders, published in 2011. Isle has sold numerous stories to publications such as Aurealis, Orb, ASIM, Agog, Sword and Sorceress, Tales of the Unanticipated (USA) and Shiny, a YA fiction magazine.

Isle's other interests include history, science fiction conventions, roleplay gaming, gardening and working out how best to turn his hometown into a post-apocalypse scenario.

== Bibliography ==
=== Novel ===
- Scale of Dragon, Tooth of Wolf (1996)

=== Nonfiction ===
- Wolf Children (1998)

=== Collection ===
- Nightsiders (2011)

=== Short fiction ===
- "To Here the Midnight Fled" in Thyme Fiction 2 (1989?)
- "Her Father's Daughter" (1990) in Sword And Sorceress VII (ed. Marion Zimmer Bradley)
- "Nightwings" (1990) in Aurealis #1 (ed. Stephen Higgins, Dirk Strasser)
- "The Last Guardian" (1990) in Glass Reptile Breakout and other Australian Speculative Stories (ed. Van Ikin)
- "Remembering Names" (1991) in Aurealis #4 (ed. Stephen Higgins, Dirk Strasser)
- "A Sprig of Aconite" (1992) in Intimate Armageddons (ed. Bill Congreve)
- "Daybreak" (1992) in Aurealis #8 (ed. Stephen Higgins, Dirk Strasser)
- "Makeover" (1993) in Terror Australis: The Best of Australian Horror (ed. Leigh Blackmore)
- "Kill Me Once" (1994) in Alien Shores : An Anthology of Australian Science Fiction (ed. Peter McNamara, Margaret Winch)
- "A Sky Full of Ravens" (1995) in She's Fantastical
- "Ice Harvest" (1995) in Aurealis #16 (ed. Stephen Higgins, Dirk Strasser)
- "Chadriki Dance" (1998) in Tales of the Unanticipated, August 1998 (ed. Eric M. Heideman)
- "Habits of Empire" (1998) in Aurealis #20/21 (ed. Stephen Higgins, Dirk Strasser)
- "Sisterchild" (1999) in Orb Speculative Fiction #0 (ed. Sarah Endacott)
- "The Woman of Endor" (2001) in Orb Speculative Fiction #2 (ed. Sarah Endacott)
- "Life and a Chance" (2001) in Tales of the Unanticipated #22 (ed. Eric M. Heideman)
- "Amy's Stars" (2003) in Orb Speculative Fiction #5 (ed. Sarah Endacott)
- "Catbones" (2003) in Andromeda Spaceways Inflight Magazine, Issue #5 (ed. Danuta Shaw)
- "Witness of Blood" (2003) in Agog! Terrific Tales (ed. Cat Sparks)
- "Doing Shadow Time" (2003) in Southern Blood: New Australian Tales of the Supernatural (ed. Bill Congreve)
- "Dog Years" (2004) in Aurealis #32 (ed. Keith Stevenson
- "Mary Bennet Goes Postal" (2005) in Tales of the Unanticipated #26 (ed. Eric M. Heideman)
- "Daughter of the Red Cranes" (2006) in Agog! Ripping Reads (ed. Cat Sparks)
- "Mary Bennet Gets a Life" (2006) in Borderlands #7
- "The Sun People" (2007) Shiny (magazine) #2 (ed. Alisa Krasnostein)
- "Heartsblood" (2008) in Tales of the Unanticipated #29 (ed. Eric M. Heideman)
- "I Can Run Faster" (2008) in Aurealis #41 (ed. Stuart Mayne)
- "Paper Dragons" (2008)
- "Candle to the Devil" [New Ceres Nights] (2009) Twelfth Planet Press
- "Nightsiders" [collection of short fiction by Sue Isle] 2011 by Twelfth Planet Press
- "Mars Peacemaker" in Review of Australian Fiction (2013)
- "The Kind Neighbours of Hell" (2014) in Use Only As Directed (ed. Simon Petrie, Edwina Harvey)
- "Pay Back" (2020) in Oz Is Burning (ed. Phyllis Irene Radford)

Some of these stories may be found at: https://curiousfictions.com/authors/503-alex-isle

=== Articles ===
- Dogs Who Are Wolves (1998) in School Magazine Reprinted 2016.
- Worldcon (2000) in Write Away Magazine (Fremantle Arts Centre)
- The Wolf Girls (2001) in School Magazine
- Roleplaying for Authors (2001) in Write Away Magazine
- Why Science Fiction Isn't Scary (2002) in Write Away Magazine
- Kept by Rats (2002) in Pets, Vets and People
- A Person, More or Less Wicked (2003 in Fables and Reflections Easter 2003

== Awards and nominations ==
Aurealis Awards

- Best Fantasy Short Story
  - 2001: Win: "The Woman of Endor"
- Best Horror Short Story
  - 2003: Nomination: "Amy's Stars"
- Best Science Fiction Short Story
  - 2003: Nomination: "Amy's Stars"

Ditmar Awards

- Best short fiction
  - 1996: Nomination: "A Sky Full of Ravens"
- Best short story
  - 2008: Nomination: "The Sun People"
