= Dreaming Down-Under =

Anthology edited by Jack Dann and Janeen Webb

- Dreaming Down-Under first edition cover.
- Author: Jack Dann, Janeen Webb
- Cover artist: Nick Stathopoulos
- Language: English
- Genre: Speculative fiction anthology
- Publisher: Voyager Books
- Publication date: November 1998
- Publication place: Australia
- Media type: Print (hardback & paperback)
- Pages: 554 (first edition)
- ISBN: 0-7322-5917-7

Dreaming Down-Under is a 1998 speculative fiction anthology edited by Jack Dann and Janeen Webb.

== Publishing history ==
Dreaming Down-Under was first published in Australia in November 1998 by Voyager Books in trade paperback format. In 1999 and 2000 it was republished as two separate volumes. It was released in the United Kingdom by Swift Publishers in 2000 and in the United States by Tor Books in hardback and paperback formats in 2001 and 2002 respectively.

== Response ==
Dreaming Down-Under won the 1999 World Fantasy Award for best anthology and the 1999 Ditmar Award for best Australian magazine or anthology. It was also a shortlist nominee for the 1998 Aurealis Award's Peter McNamara Conveners' Award for Excellence and it finished 16th out of 20 in the Locus Award for Best Anthology.

The 1999 Ditmar Award for Best Short Fiction had six shortlist nominees all of which were taken from Dreaming Down-Under: "The Marsh Runners" by Paul Brandon, "Dream Until God Burns" by Andrew Enstice, "To Avalon" by Jane Routley, "The Evil Within" by Sara Douglass, and "Queen of Soulmates" by Sean McMullen, which were all nominees lost to "The Truth About Weena" by David J. Lake. "The Truth About Weena" by David J. Lake also won the 1998 Aurealis Award for Best Science Fiction Short Story, while "To Avalon" by Jane Routley and "Queen of Soulmates" by Sean McMullen were also shortlist nominees for the Aurealis Award for Best Fantasy Short Story and "The Marsh Runners" by Paul Brandon was also a shortlist nominee for the Aurealis Award for Best Horror Short Story. Another winning story was "A Walk-On Part in the War" by Stephen Dedman which won the Aurealis Award for Best Fantasy Short Story. While "The Third Rail" by Aaron Sterns was a shortlist nominee for the Aurealis Award for Best Horror Short Story, "Jetsam" by Kerry Greenwood was a shortlist nominee for best fantasy short story in the Aurealis Awards, "Real Men" by Rosaleen Love was a shortlist nominee for the Aurealis Award for best science fiction short story and "The Body Politic" by Tess Williams was a long-list nominee 1999 James Tiptree Jr. Memorial Award.

== Contents ==
Dreaming Down-Under features 31 stories from 30 authors.

- What Stands for a Preface by Harlan Ellison
- Introduction by Jack Dann and Janeen Webb
- "Entre les Beaux Morts en Vie (Among the Beautiful Living Dead)", novelette by Sean Williams
- "The Dancing Floor", novelette by Cherry Wilder
- "Descent", short story by Cecily Scutt
- "The Soldier in the Machine", novelette by Russell Blackford
- "Matilda Told Such Dreadful Lies", short story by Lucy Sussex
- "The Womb", novelette by Damien Broderick
- "A Walk-On Part in the War", short story by Stephen Dedman
- "Wired Dreaming", short story by Paul Collins
- "The Body Politic", short story by Tess Williams
- "The Truth About Weena", novelette by David J. Lake (part of the H. G. Wells' The Time Machine universe)
- "The Marsh Runners", short story by Paul Brandon
- "Prelude to a Nocturne", novelette by Cory Daniells (as Rowena Cory Lindquist)
- "Real Men", short story by Rosaleen Love
- "The Latest Dream I Ever Dreamed", short story by Norman Talbot
- "Ma Rung", short story by Steven Paulsen
- "Dream, Until God Burns", short story by Andrew Enstice
- "Night of the Wandjina", short story by Wynne Whiteford
- "To Avalon", short story by Jane Routley
- "He Tried to Catch the Light", novelette by Terry Dowling
- "The Third Rail", short story by Aaron Sterns
- "Jetsam", short story by Kerry Greenwood
- "And Now Doth Time Waste Me", novella by George Turner
- Afterword (to "And Now Doth Time Waste Me") by Judith Raphael Buckrich
- Afterword (to "And Now Doth Time Waste Me") by Bruce Gillespie
- "The Man Who Lost His Shadow", short story by Isobelle Carmody
- "Unborn Again", short story by Chris Lawson
- "The Evil Within", novella by Sara Douglass
- "Two Recipes for Magic Beans", short story by Rosaleen Love
- "The Doppelgänger Effect", short story by Dirk Strasser
- "Tamed", short story by Robert Hood
- "Queen of Soulmates", novelette by Sean McMullen
- "The Last Dance", short story by Ian Nichols
- "With Clouds at Our Feet", short story by Simon Brown
