= Louise Katz =

Australian novelist and academic

- Born: Canberra, Australia
- Occupations: Writer, academic
- Writing career
- Genres: Fantasy, science fiction, young adult
- Notable awards: Aurealis Award; Best young-adult novel 2001 The Other Face of Janus; Best fantasy short story 2004 Weavers of the Twilight

Louise Katz is an Australian fantasy and science fiction novelist and academic.

== Biography ==
Katz was born in Canberra, Australia, and attended art school in Adelaide. She is a Doctor of Creative Arts and has taught creative writing and academic writing at the University of Technology, Sydney and the University of Sydney.

In 1996 Katz' first book, Myfanwy's Demon, was published. Her second novel, The Other Face of Janus, was released in 2001; the book won the 2001 Aurealis Award for best young-adult novel. The Orchid Nursery from 2016 won the Norma K. Hemming award for that year. Katz has also published short fiction, including the short story "Weavers of the Twilight" which was a joint winner of the 2004 Aurealis Award for best fantasy short story.

== Awards ==
- 2001 – Aurealis award, for The Other Face of Janus
- 2004 – Co-winner, Aurealis Award, for "Weavers of the Twilight"
- 2016 – Winner, Norma K. Hemming award, for The Orchid Nursery

== Selected bibliography ==
=== Novels ===
- Myfanwy's Demon (1996) HarperCollins, ISBN 0732251672
- The Other Face of Janus (2001) HarperCollins, ISBN 0207197091
- The Orchid Nursery (2015) Lacuna Publishing, ISBN 9781922198204

=== Short fiction ===
- 2004 "Weavers of the Twilight", short story, in Agog! Smashing Stories, Wollongong, Australia: Agog! Press
- 2000 "The Little Demon", short story, in Mystery, Magic, Voodoo, Sydney: HarperCollins
- 2009 "The Absent Men", novella, in X-6 Anthology, Sydney: Coeur de Lion Publishing
