= Jo Anderton =

Australian writer

- Occupation: marketing coordinator
- Writing career
- Genres: Fantasy, Horror, science fiction
- Subject: Speculative fiction
- Notable works: Debris; Bone Chime Song and other stories
- Notable awards: Aurealis Award (2013); Australian Shadows Award (2013)
- Website: joanderton.com

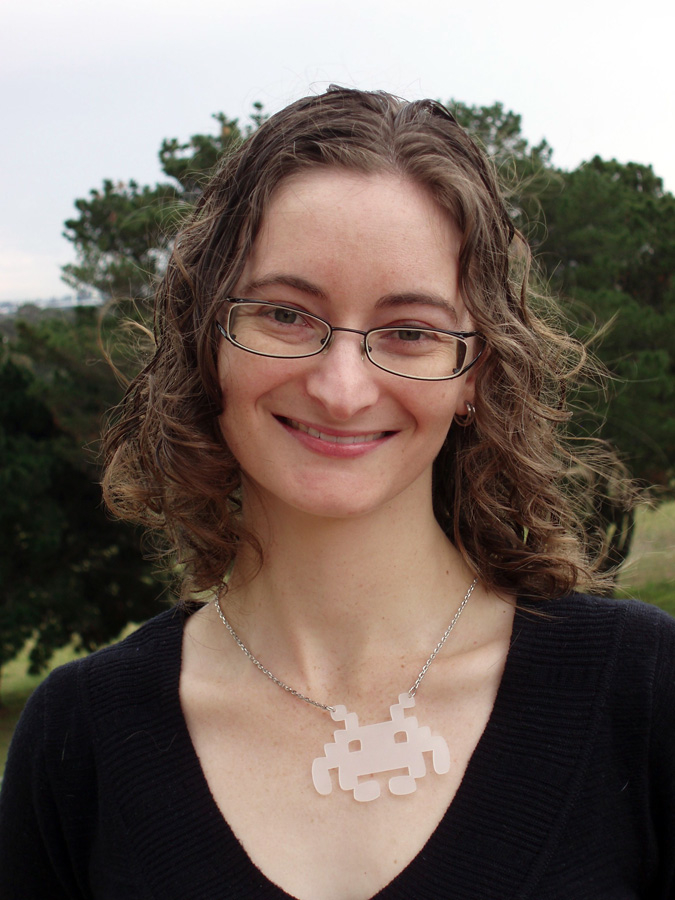
Jo Anderton

Jo Anderton is an Australian author of fantasy, horror, and other forms of speculative fiction. She has been a finalist for, and recipient of, multiple literary awards recognizing her work.

By day, Anderton works as a marketing coordinator for an Australian book distributor. In her spare time, she writes dark fantasy, science fiction, and horror.

In 2011, she published her first book in the Veiled Worlds trilogy, Debris. Her second book in the trilogy, Suited, appeared in 2012. The third book, Guardian, was published by FableCroft Publishing in 2014.

In 2013, Anderton published her first short story collection, Bone Chime Song and other stories (FableCroft Publishing). The collection received critical acclaim, winning both the Aurealis Award and the Australian Shadows Award for Best Collection. It was also shortlisted for the Ditmar Award Best Collected Work.

== Awards and shortlistings ==
- "Mah Song" from The Bone Chime Song and other stories (FableCroft Publishing), Best Short Fiction, 2013 Ditmar Awards shortlist.
- "Mah Song" from The Bone Chime Song and other stories (FableCroft Publishing), Best Young Adult Short Story, 2013 Aurealis Awards shortlist.
- "Mah Song" from The Bone Chime Song and other stories (FableCroft Publishing), Best Science Fiction Short Story, 2013 Aurealis Awards shortlist.
- "The Last Tiger" from Daily Science Fiction, Best Science Fiction Short Story, 2013 Aurealis Awards shortlist.
- "Fencelines" from The Bone Chime Song and other stories (FableCroft Publishing), Best Horror Short Story, 2013 Aurealis Awards shortlist.
- "Fencelines" from The Bone Chime Song and other stories (FableCroft Publishing), Short Fiction, 2012 Australian Shadows Awards shortlist.
- The Bone Chime Song and other stories (FableCroft Publishing), Best Collected Work, 2013 Ditmar Awards shortlist.
- The Bone Chime Song and other stories (FableCroft Publishing), Best Collection, 2013 Australian Shadows Awards WINNER.
- The Bone Chime Song and other stories (FableCroft Publishing, Best Collection, 2013 Aurealis Awards WINNER.
- Suited (Angry Robot), Best Novel, 2012 Ditmar Awards shortlist.
- Suited (Angry Robot), Best Science Fiction Novel, 2012 Aurealis Awards shortlist.
- "The Bone Chime Song" from Light Touch Paper Stand Clear (Peggy Bright Books), Best Short Fiction 2012 Ditmar Awards shortlist.
- "Sanaa's Army" from Bloodstones (Ticonderoga Publications), Best Short Fiction, 2012 Ditmar Awards shortlist.
- "Sanaa's Army" from Bloodstones (Ticonderoga Publications), Best Science Fiction Short Story, 2012 Aurealis Awards shortlist.
- "Sanaa's Army" from Bloodstones (Ticonderoga Publications), Best Horror Short Story, 2012 Aurealis Awards shortlist.
- "Flowers in the Shadow of the Garden" from Hope (2011), (Kayelle Press), 2012 WSFA Small Press Award shortlist.
- "Flowers in the Shadow of the Garden" from Hope (Kayelle Press), 2011 Best Science Fiction Short Story, 2011 Aurealis Awards shortlist.
- "Dragon Bones" from Andromeda Spaceways Inflight Magazine, No. 39, Best Young Adult Short Story, 2009 Aurealis Awards shortlist.
- Debris (Angry Robot), Best Fantasy Novel, 2012 Aurealis Awards shortlist.
- "The Sea at Night" from Dead Red Heart (Ticonderoga Publications), Short Fiction, 2011 Australian Shadows Awards shortlist.
- "Out Hunting for Teeth" from Midnight Echo No. 6, Short Fiction, 2011 Australian Shadows Awards shortlist.
- Jo Anderton, Best New Talent Ditmar Awards WINNER, 2012.
- “Nice Safe Emotions: How Murderbot copes with the real world through the fictional, and so do we” (Speculative Insight 1/24) winner William Atheling Jr Award for Criticism or Review 2025.

== Bibliography ==
=== Fiction ===
==== Novels ====
Veiled Worlds series

1. Anderton, Jo (2011). Debris. Oxford: Angry Robot.
2. Suited, (2012), Angry Robot Books.
3. Guardian, (2014), FableCroft Publishing.

==== Collected stories ====
- The Bone Chime Song and other stories, (2013), FableCroft Publishing.

==== Short fiction ====
- "The Feast", published in Shadowed Realms, 2005.
- "Bond", published by Deep Magic, 2006.
- "Swinging the World". Won the Lightning Flash Fiction competition at Flash Me magazine, October 2006.
- "Threefold", published at Bewildering Stories, 2007.
- "Darkened", published in Staffs & Starships Magazine, 2007.
- "Mirror Dirt", published in Flashspec, vol. 2, 2007.
- "Thread Embrace", published at The Harrow, 2007.
- "Flightless", published at Arcane Twilight, 2007.
- "Whale Fall", published at Daikaijuzine, 2007.
- "When the Mountain Weeps", published in Touched by Wonder by Meadowhawk Press, 2007.
- "Trail of Dead", published in Zombies by Altair Australia, 2007.
- "Demons and Gin", published in Niteblade, 2007.
- "Dogs", published in Aurealis, 2007.
- "Wordwitch", the issue feature story at A Fly in Amber, July 2008.
- "Cold Beneath the Bougainvillea", published in the Black Box, 2008.
- "Death Masque", published in CSFG anthology, Masques, March 2009.
- "Trail of Dead", reprinted in Australian Dark Fantasy and Horror vol. 3 by Brimstone Press, 2009.
- "Dragon Bones", published in Andromeda Spaceways Inflight Magazine, no. 39, June 2009. Shortlisted for the Aurealis Award for Best Young Adult Short Story.
- "Shadow of Drought", published in Midnight Echo 2, June 2009.
- "Albatross Ghosts", published in Kaleidotrope No. 7, October 2009.
- "Little Ghost Boy", published in Midnight Echo 3, November 2009.
- "A Little Courage", autobiographical story published in Out of the Frying Pan: Bittersweet Tales of Stumbling into Adulthood by Finch Publishing, March 2010.
- "Graffiti", a Young Adult story published in Worlds Next Door by FableCroft Publishing, August 2010.
- "Breathtaker", published in Andromeda Spaceways Inflight Magazine issue No. 44, August 2010.
- "The Sea at Night", published in Dead Red Heart by Ticonderoga Publications, April 2011. Received an honourable mention in the 2011 Australian Shadows Award for best short story.
- "From the Dry Heart to the Sea", published in After the Rain by FableCroft Publishing, April 2011.
- "Flowers in the Shadow of the Garden", published in the Hope Anthology from Kayelle Press, October 2011. Finalist for the Aurealis Award for Best Science Fiction Short Story.
- "Out Hunting for Teeth", published in Midnight Echo 6, November 2011. It received an honourable mention in the 2011 Australian Shadows Awards for best short story.
- "High Density", published in ASIM, February 2012.
- "Tied to the Waste", published in Tales of the Talisman, March 2012.
- "A Memory Trapped in Light", published in Epilogue from Fablecroft Publishing, June 2012.
- "The Bone Chime Song", published in Light Touch Paper Stand Clear from Peggy Bright Books, June 2012.
- "Luminaire" published in From Stage Door Shadows, eMergent Publishing, September 2012.
- "Sanaa's Army" in Bloodstones, October 2012
- "Always a Price" in Midnight Echo No. 8, 2012.
- "Dredging" in 100 Lightnings
- "Mah Song" in The Bone Chime Song and other stories from FableCroft Publishing, 2013.
- "Fencelines" in The Bone Chime Song and other stories from FableCroft Publishing, 2013.
- "Sand and Seawater" (with Rabia Gale) in One Small Step, an anthology of discoveries from FableCroft Publishing, 2013.
- "The Last Tiger" at Daily Science Fiction, 2013.

Title	Year	First published	Reprinted/collected	Notes
Simulation theory	2013	Anderton, Jo (February–March 2014). "Simulation theory". Coda. Fiction. Cosmos. 55. Illustrated by James Nathan: 97–103. Archived from the original on 12 April 2017.		

=== Non-fiction ===
- "Story behind "The Bone Chime Song and Other Stories"" (2013), from "Story Behind the Book : Volume 1"
