= Kayelle Press =

- Status: Active
- Founded: 2010
- Country of origin: Australia
- Headquarters location: Blue Mountains, NSW
- Distribution: Worldwide
- Fiction genres: Speculative Fiction
- Official website: KayellePress.com

Kayelle Press, founded in September 2010, was an independent publisher of speculative fiction (fantasy, science fiction, and horror) for younger readers (aged between 9 and 12 years), young adults and adults. Currently (July 2015), its webpage says that the press is "closed," and it thanks both readers and writers for having supported it.

It was located in the Blue Mountains, New South Wales, Australia.

== Titles ==
=== 2010 ===
- Cat's Eyes (Land of Miu, #1) by Karen Lee Field (ISBN 978-0-9808642-0-5 (pbk.) and ISBN 978-0-9808642-1-2 (eBook)) — 10 December 2010.

=== 2011 ===
- Hope: An anthology of speculative fiction to help raise suicide awareness edited by Sasha Beattie (ISBN 978-0-9808642-2-9 (pbk.) and ISBN 978-0-9808642-3-6 (eBook)) — 7 October 2011.
- The Land of Miu (Land of Miu, #1) — originally published with the title of "Cat's Eyes" in Dec 2010 (ISBN 978-0-9808642-7-4 (pbk.) and ISBN 978-0-9808642-4-3 (ebook)) — 25 Nov 2011.

=== 2012 ===
- The King's Riddle (Land of Miu, #2) by Karen Lee Field (ISBN 978-0-9808642-5-0 (pbk.) and ISBN 978-0-9808642-6-7 (eBook) — 25 January 2012
- Night Terrors Anthology edited by Karen Henderson (ISBN 978-0-9808642-8-1 (pbk.) and ISBN 978-0-9808642-9-8 (ebook)) — 13 April 2012

=== 2013 ===
- Speculative Realms: An Anthology edited by Sasha Beattie (ISBN 978-1-4523-0501-1 (3rd ed. ebook)) — 6 January 2013
- Tomorrow: Apocalyptic short stories edited by Karen Henderson (ISBN 978-0-9875657-0-9 (pbk.) and ISBN 978-0-9875657-1-6 (ebook)) — 22 June 2013

=== Upcoming ===
2013 — The Obelisk Trap by Margaret Pearce (Book 1 in the Awesome Aussie Tales series)
2014 — Hope Vol. 2 (anthology) edited by Karen Henderson
TBA — The Lion Gods (Land of Miu, #3) by Karen Lee Field

== Authors ==
Joanne Anderton
Jason Andrew
Reece A. A. Barnard
Warren Bartik
Alan Baxter
Sasha Beattie
Mike Brooks
Jodi Cleghorn
Janette Dalgliesh
Rowena Cory Daniells
Lorne Dixon
Chris Donahue
Robert Essig
Ryan Neil Falcone
Karen Lee Field
Pamela Freeman
Lindsey Goddard
Paul Haines
Carole Hall
JC Hemphill
Lyall Henderson
Joshua S Hill
Craig Hull
Davin Ireland
Tim Jeffreys
Calvin D. Jim
C. I. Kemp
Lancer Kind
Robin Kirk
Lisamarie Lamb
Andrew J McKiernan
Dr Myfanwy Maple
Susan May
David Meadows
Robert J. Mendenhall
Jeff Parish
Stephen Patrick
Margaret Pearce
Sherry D. Ramsey
Rob Rosen
Jonathan Shipley
Steve Simpson
Benjamin Solah
Graham Storrs
Aric Sundquist
Joseph S. Walker
Sabrina West
Ian Whates
Sean Williams
TW Williams
Suzanne J. Willis
William R.D. Wood

== Editors ==
Sasha Beattie
Karen Henderson

== Awards ==
=== Finalist ===
- 2011 Aurealis Award, Science Fiction Short Story: “Flowers in the Shadow of the Garden” by Joanne Anderton
- 2012 WSFA Small Press Award: “Flowers in the Shadow of the Garden” by Joanne Anderton
