= Immaterial (short story collection) =

Book by Robert Hood

- Author: Robert Hood
- Cover artist: Cat Sparks
- Language: English
- Genre: Horror
- Publisher: MirrorDanse Books
- Publication date: May 2002
- Publication place: Australia
- Media type: Print (paperback)
- Pages: 191
- ISBN: 0-9586583-6-6

Immaterial is a collection of horror stories by Australian horror writer Robert Hood. Immaterial collects fifteen tales featuring ghosts and grue in plenty, aptly demonstrating his range of concerns and effects.

== Background ==
In 2001 Bill Congreve approached Hood with the idea of putting together a retrospective-style collection of his works. Immaterial was published in May 2002 by Congreve's publishing company MirrorDanse Books.

== Contents ==
- "An Apocalyptic Horse" – a bleak post-endtimes tale.
- "Number 7" – a holidaying couple encounter the legend that a double and not Rudolf Hess himself died in Spandau prison; there is the suggestion that Hess stole some of the Führer's demonic science.
- "Peripheral Movement in the Leaves Under an Orange Tree" – is a finely judged tale of haunted leaf litter and skewed perception;
- "Resonance of the Flesh" – concerns a ritual based on the protagonist's theory of morphic resonance and magic, the idea that there is a hidden continuum of reality (which he dubs the ‘neomorphuum’).
- "Housewarming" (with Paul Collins) – one of the weaker tales in the collection, concerns the revenge of a house upon a group of seven teenagers who burned it down, killing old Edith Withers and her two children.
- "Rough Trade" – the gargoyle made by sculptor Max Rusch twenty years ago now seeks to take on humanity; the outcome of their Frankenstein-like relationship is affecting.
- "Grandma and the Girls" – is a tensely macabre story of a domineering grandmother who haunts her family and is haunted by them. *"Dead in the Glamour of Moonlight”, one of Hood's best tales, features a revenant of the murdered Nicole haunting her killer, Virgil; it is simultaneously a crime/zombie story.
- "Maculate Conception" – in which a man suffering separation from his wife seeks to obliterate a stain on his wall which ultimately proves the result of his own suicide, is rich with Hood's deep feeling for the protagonist's situation.
- "A Place for the Dead" – is equally grim, dark, and unrelenting in its concept of the New Dead (corpses who will not stay dead) and its dealing with child sexual abuse.
- "Dem Bones" – supernatural revenge
- "Occasional Demons" – a dead princess haunts the young Republic of future Australia
- "Nasty Little Habits" – a mother is tormented by her son's ghost
- "The Calling" – evokes a cosmic being in the best spirit of Algernon Blackwood.
