= Chimaera Publications =

Australian publisher of speculative fiction

- Country of origin: Australia
- Headquarters location: Mount Waverley, Victoria
- Fiction genres: Speculative fiction
- Official website: Aurealis.com.au

Chimaera Publications is a publisher based in Mount Waverley, Victoria, Australia. The company currently publishes the speculative fiction magazine Aurealis as well as running the Aurealis Awards.

== History ==
Chimaera Publications begun publishing the Aurealis magazine in 1990. In 1995 Chimaera established the Aurealis Awards which is held yearly to reward the achievement in Australian speculative fiction. Chimaera also publishes books and in 2004 they published the multi-award-winning novel The Black Crusade by Richard Harland. The Black Crusade won the 2004 Aurealis Award for best horror novel and was named the 2004 Golden Aurealis novel. It was a short-list nominee for the 2005 Ditmar Award for best novel. The artwork featured on the cover of The Black Crusade also won the 2005 Ditmar award for best artwork for Kerri Valkova.

== Aurealis magazine ==
Aurealis was first released in April 1990 and was edited by Dirk Strasser and Stephen Higgins. It is currently edited by Stuart Mayne. In 1993 it was a short-list nominee for the Ditmar Award for best periodical, losing to the Eidolon (Australian magazine) magazine. In 1999 it was a short-list nominee for the Ditmar Award for best Australian magazine or anthology, losing to Jack Dann and Janeen Webb's Dreaming Down-Under. The artwork also received nominations at the Ditmar Awards Trudi Canavan was a finalist for best professional artwork for the cover Aurealis #17 as well as her work on Eidolon #22/23 but lost to Elizabeth Kyle's cover of Dream Weavers and Adam Duncan was a short-list nominee for best artwork in 2009 but lost to Shaun Tan's Tales from Outer Suburbia. The magazine has featured short stories which have been short-listed and won literary awards. These stories have won five Aurealis Awards and a Ditmar Award and have been short-list nominees at these awards on 21 other occasions.

== Aurealis Awards ==
The Aurealis Awards have been running since 1995 and were developed to award work in speculative fiction. They were administered by Fantastic Queensland from 2004 to 2010 in partnership with Chimaera. The Aurealis Awards were created to differ from the Ditmar Award and the Australian Children’s Book Council Awards which don't distinguish between different genres of speculative fiction. The Aurealis Awards give separate awards for fantasy, horror and science fiction works across different age ranges.
