= Janeen Webb =

Australian writer, critic and editor

- Born: 29 August 1951 (age 75); Charlestown, New South Wales
- Occupation: Author
- Writing career
- Genres: Science fiction, fantasy

Janeen Webb (née Pemberton) is an Australian writer, critic and editor, working mainly in the field of science fiction and fantasy.

== Biography ==
The daughter of a Second World War Australian Army commando and salesman, Webb was brought up in the Newcastle suburb of Charlestown and was educated at local schools. She then studied at the University of Newcastle, New South Wales where she gained a Ph.D. in literature in 1983. For many years, she taught at the Institute of Catholic Education (later part of the Australian Catholic University) in Melbourne, Victoria where she was Associate Professor and Reader in literature.

From 1987 to 1991, Webb was a member of the editorial collective of Australian Science Fiction Review: Second Series, and is currently on the advisory board of Science Fiction Studies. She is perhaps best known for her co-editorship, with her second husband, Jack Dann, of a major anthology of Australian science fiction and fantasy, Dreaming Down-Under (Sydney: HarperCollins, 1998; New York: Tor Books, 1999), which won its editors a World Fantasy Award for Best Anthology, as well as a 1999 Ditmar Award.

Her other publications include Aliens & Savages: Fiction, Politics and Prejudice (1998), The Fantastic Self (an edited collection of critical essays on fantasy and science fiction) (1999) and a scholarly edition of The Yellow Wave, Kenneth Mackay's important 1895 scientific romance (2003). These books were written and edited with her colleague, Andrew Enstice.

Webb wrote a series of novels for young adults, The Sinbad Chronicles. The two books are Sailing to Atlantis (2001) and The Silken Road to Samarkand (2003).

In 1995, she married Jack Dann, an American science fiction author, with whom she resides near Foster in rural Victoria.

== Works ==
ISFDB is one source, which Webb's website incorporates with modification.

=== Non-fiction ===
- Aliens & Savages: Fiction, Politics and Prejudice in Australia, by Webb and Andrew Enstice (1998)
- Fantastic Self: Essays on the Subject of the Self, edited by Webb and Enstice

=== Fiction as editor ===
- Dreaming Down-Under (1998), Webb and Jack Dann – anthology, reissued 1999–2000 in 2 vols.
- Yellow Wave: A Romance of the Asiatic Invasion of Australia, by Kenneth Mackay (2003), Webb and Enstice – 1895 novel

=== Novels ===
The Sinbad Chronicles

- Sailing to Atlantis (2001)
- The Silken Road to Samarkand (2003)

Dragons of Hong Kong

- The Dragon's Child (PS Publishing, 2018) – novella
- The Gold-Jade Dragon (2020)

=== Short fiction ===
- "Death at the Blue Elephant" (1996) in Enter: HQ/Flamingo Short Story Collection
- "Niagara Falling" (1997, with Jack Dann) in Black Mist and Other Japanese Futures (ed. Orson Scott Card, Keith Ferrell)
- "Incident on Wolfe Street" (1998) in HQ Magazine Jan/Feb 2000
- "Ali Baba and the Forty Aliens" (2000) in A Wolf at the Door and Other Retold Fairy Tales (ed. Ellen Datlow, Terri Windling)
- "The Fire-eater's Tale" (2000, with Jack Dann) in Strange Attraction (ed. Edward E. Kramer)
- "Gawain and the Selkie's Daughter" (2002) in The Road to Camelot (ed. Sophie Masson)
- "Tigershow" (2003) in Agog! Terrific Tales (ed. Cat Sparks)
- "Blake's Angel" (2003) in Gathering the Bones (ed. Ramsey Campbell, Jack Dann, Dennis Etchison)
- "Red City" (2004) in Year's Best SF 10 (ed. David G. Hartwell, Kathryn Cramer)
- "The Lion Hunt" (2004) in Conqueror Fantastic (ed. Pamela Sargent)
- "A Faust Films Production" (2004) in Little Red Riding Hood in the Big Bad City, (ed. Martin H. Greenberg, John Helfers)
- "Paradise Design'd" (2008) in Dreaming Again, ed. Jack Dann; rpt. in Novascapes, (ed. C.E. Page, 2014)
- "Future Perfect" (2014) in Use Only As Directed (ed. Simon Petrie, Edwina Harvey)
- Death and the Blue Elephant (Ticonderoga, 2014) – collection of 18 stories

=== Essays ===
- "The Vampire of Shalott" (1993) in The New York Review of Science Fiction, December 1993 (ed. Kathryn Cramer, L. W. Currey, Samuel R. Delany, David G. Hartwell, Donald G. Keller, Robert K. J. Killheffer, Gordon Van Gelder)
- "Post-Romantic Romance: Guy Gavriel Kay's Tigana and A Song for Arbonne" (1995) in The New York Review of Science Fiction January 1995, (ed. Kathryn Cramer, L. W. Currey, Samuel R. Delany, Gordon Van Gelder, David G. Hartwell, Donald G. Keller, Robert K. J. Killheffer)
- "Introduction" (1998, with Jack Dann) in Dreaming Down-Under
- "Introduction" and "Notes" (2003, with Andrew Enstice) in The Yellow Wave, by Kenneth Mackay
- "Foreword" (2004, with Dena Bain Taylor) in The Summer Tree, ed. Guy Gavriel Kay
