= Lee Battersby =

Australian author

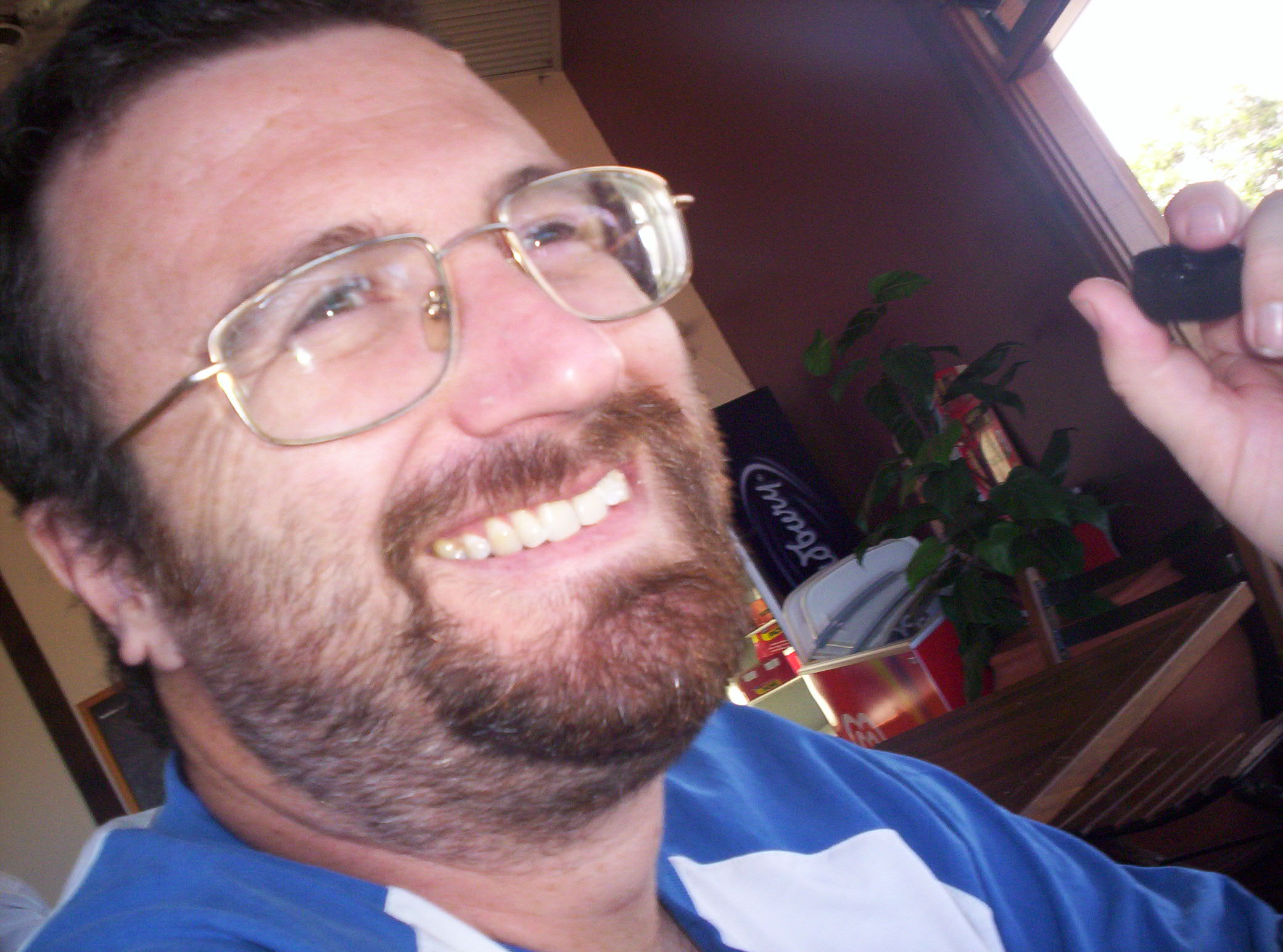
- Born: 1970 (age 55–56); Nottingham, United Kingdom
- Occupation: Writer
- Writing career
- Period: 2002–present
- Genres: Science fiction, fantasy, horror

Lee Battersby (born 1970) is an Australian author of science fiction, fantasy, and horror fiction. His story "Carrying The God" made him the first Western Australian winner in the Writers of the Future Competition in 2002, and was awarded the 2003 Ditmar Award for Best New Talent. His short story "Tales of Nireym" was a finalist in the Fantasy section of the 2005 Aurealis Awards, and "Pater Familias" won Best Horror Short Story in the 2006 awards. Another story, "Father Muerte & The Flesh", the third in his popular Father Muerte series, was awarded the inaugural Australian Shadows Award for outstanding literary achievement by the Australian Horror Writers Association in 2006. He won the award again in 2008 for "The Claws of Native Ghosts", a story which appeared in Graveside Tales' anthology "The Beast Within".

Battersby was one of the tutors at Clarion South 2007, along with SF writers Robert Hood, Simon Brown, Margo Lanagan and Kelly Link; and editor Gardner Dozois.

His first collection, Through Soft Air, was released by US Publisher Prime Books in March 2006. It contains 25 stories, including both "Tales of Nireym" and "Pater Familias". "Dark Ages", a story exclusive to the collection, was nominated for both best Fantasy Short Story and Best SF Short Story in the 2006 Aurealis Awards.

In 2007, he contributed a story to the Doctor Who short-story collection, Short Trips: Destination Prague.

In 2013, he contributed an essay to the Upcoming4.me charity non-fiction anthology, Story Behind the Book : Volume 1.
