= Orb Publications =

Australian publishing company

- Country of origin: Australia
- Headquarters location: Ringwood, Victoria
- Fiction genres: Speculative fiction
- Official website: Official site

Orb Publications is a publisher based in Ringwood, Victoria, Australia. The company currently publishes the speculative fiction magazine Orb Speculative Fiction.

== History ==
Orb Publications began publishing the Orb Speculative Fiction magazine in 1999.

== Orb Speculative Fiction ==
Orb Speculative Fiction (also known simply as Orb) was first released in 1999 and was edited by Sarah Endacott. In 2002 Orb #2 was a short-list nominee in the Ditmar Awards for best collected work but lost to Earth Is But a Star, edited by Damien Broderick.

Orb again was nominated for best collected work in 2005 and 2008 for the issues six and seven respectively. Two authors have won awards for their stories featured in Orb. Sue Isle's "The Woman of Endor" won the 2001 Aurealis Award for best fantasy short story and Cat Sparks' "A Lady of Adestan" won the 2008 Ditmar Award for best novella as well as being a finalist in the 2007 Aurealis Award for best fantasy short story. The magazine has also featured ten other short stories which have been finalists at the Aurealis and Ditmar Awards.
