= Ben Peek =

Australian writer

Benjamin Michael Peek
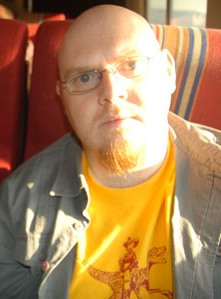
- Ben Peek at the 2007 World Fantasy Convention
- Born: Ben Michael Peek; 12 October 1976 (age 49); Sydney, New South Wales
- Occupation: Author
- Writing career
- Genre: Speculative fiction
- Website: benpeek.livejournal.com

Ben Peek (born 12 October 1976 in Sydney, New South Wales) is an Australian author. His middle name is Michael.

Peek's short stories have been published in a variety of genre magazines, including Fantasy Magazine and Aurealis. His fiction has been reprinted in various Year's Best volumes. In 2000, he created a zine called The Urban Sprawl Project, a black and white pamphlet of photography and prose, and this remains the name of his online journal. In 2006 his autobiography, Twenty-Six Lies/One Truth, was published by Wheatland Press with artwork from Andrew Macrae and Anna Brown. In 2007, Black Sheep, a dystopian novel, was published by Prime Books. In 2007, Peek also began collaborating with artist Anna Brown on Nowhere Near Savannah, an online comic that in part follows on from their original collaboration on Twenty-Six Lies/One Truth. Peek has claimed that every incident described in Nowhere near Savannah is true.

Peek holds a Bachelor of Arts (Hons) from the University of Western Sydney, and a PhD in Creative Writing from the University of New South Wales, during which he wrote the novel A Year in the City. His reviews have appeared on several websites including, PopImage, Sequential Tart, and Strange Horizons. In 2005 he interviewed over forty Australian speculative fiction writers, editors and publishers as part of The 2005 Snapshot: Australian Speculative Fiction.

Peek's writing is best described as speculative fiction. However, he often takes fundamental elements of the genre and combines them into other styles. Recurring themes in Peek's work include the representation of race and multiculturalism. Peek has also written a number of works that play with story form, including Twenty-Six Lies/One Truth and Johnny Cash.

== Published fiction ==
=== Novels and longer works ===
- Leviathan's Blood: Book Two of the Children Trilogy (2016) Thomas Dunne Books
- The Godless (2014), Thomas Dunne Books.
- Dead Americans (2013), short story collection, ChiZine Publications.
- Below in Above/Below with Stephanie Campisi, (2011), Twelfth Planet Press.
- Black Sheep, a dystopian novel (2007), Prime Books.
- Twenty-Six Lies/One Truth (2006), Wheatland Press.
- The Enigma Variant (1999), with Chris Mowbray. MirrorDanse Books.

== Award nominations ==
Peek has been nominated for the Ditmar Awards (Australian SF Award) nine times. He is the second most nominated individual not to win a Ditmar. He has twice been nominated for the Aurealis Award.
