= Simon Petrie =

New Zealand writer

- Born: New Zealand
- Children: Tycho Petrie (Son)
- Writing career
- Genre: Speculative fiction
- Notable awards: Sir Julius Vogel Award
- Website: simonpetrie.wordpress.com

Simon Petrie is a New Zealand-born speculative fiction writer now based in Canberra, Australia. He is predominantly recognised as a writer in the science fiction and fantasy genres. Petrie's stories have appeared in a number of Australian publications including Borderlands, Aurealis and Andromeda Spaceways Inflight Magazine, in New Zealand publications such as Semaphore Magazine and several Random Static anthologies, and in magazines elsewhere in the English-speaking world such as Redstone Science Fiction, Murky Depths and Sybil's Garage. He is a former member of the Andromeda Spaceways Inflight Magazine collective and has edited five issues of the magazine.

Petrie's work has seen several nominations for Australian and New Zealand speculative fiction awards and he has won the Sir Julius Vogel Award (New Zealand SF Award) three times: in 2010 for Best New Talent, and in 2013 and 2018 for Best Novella or Novelette. He is best known for two series of stories: his 'Gordon Mamon' stories ("Murder on the Zenith Express", "Single Handed", "The Fall Guy", The Hunt For Red Leicester, "A Night To Remember", "Elevator Pitch" and "This Guy's The Limit") centred around the exploits of a space-elevator operative who doubles as a reluctant detective and his 'Titan' stories (Wide Brown Land, a collection of eleven short stories, and the novella Matters Arising from the Identification of the Body) exploring human colonization of the Saturnian satellite.

== Bibliography ==
Collected short fiction

- Rare Unsigned Copy: tales of Rocketry, Ineptitude, and Giant Mutant Vegetables (2010, Peggy Bright Books)
- Difficult Second Album: more stories of Xenobiology, Space Elevators, and Bats Out Of Hell (2014, Peggy Bright Books)
- Wide Brown Land: stories of Titan (2018, Peggy Bright Books)
- 80,000 Totally Secure Passwords That No Hacker Would Ever Guess (2018)
- Murder on the Zenith Express: the Gordon Mamon collection (2018)

Novellas

- Flight 404/The Hunt for Red Leicester (2012, Peggy Bright Books)
- Matters Arising from the Identification of the Body (2017, Peggy Bright Books)

Anthologies—as editor or coeditor

- Andromeda Spaceways Inflight Magazine issues 35, 40, 51, 54, 61 (2008–2015, Andromeda Spaceways Publishing Co-operative)
- Light Touch Paper, Stand Clear (2012, Peggy Bright Books, coeditor with Edwina Harvey)
- Next (2013, CSFG Publishing, coeditor with Robert Porteous)
- Use Only As Directed (2014, Peggy Bright Books, coeditor with Edwina Harvey)

== Awards and nominations ==
In the following table, entries with a blue background won the award; those with a white background were the nominees on the short-list.

* Award winner
* Nominee on the shortlist

Year	Work	Award	Category	Ref.
2008	"Murder on the Zenith Express"	Sir Julius Vogel Award	Best Short Story	
2008	(body of work)	Sir Julius Vogel Award	Best New Talent	
2010	(body of work)	Ditmar Award	Best New Talent	
2010	"Single Handed"	Sir Julius Vogel Award	Best Novella or Novelette	
2010	"Downdraft"	Sir Julius Vogel Award	Best Short Story	
2010	(body of work)	Sir Julius Vogel Award	Best New Talent	
2011	Rare Unsigned Copy	Sir Julius Vogel Award	Best Collected Work	
2013	Flight 404	Ditmar Award	Best Novella or Novelette	
2013	Light Touch Paper, Stand Clear	Ditmar Award	Best Collected Work	
2013	Flight 404	Sir Julius Vogel Award	Best Novella or Novelette	
2013	The Hunt For Red Leicester	Sir Julius Vogel Award	Best Novella or Novelette	
2014	Difficult Second Album	Aurealis Award	Best Collection	
2016	"All the Colours of the Tomato"	Aurealis Award	Best Science Fiction Novella	
2017	"All the Colours of the Tomato"	Ditmar Award	Best Novella or Novelette	<
2017	Matters Arising from the Identification of the Body	Aurealis Award	Best Science Fiction Novella	
2018	Matters Arising from the Identification of the Body	Ditmar Award	Best Novella or Novelette	
2018	Matters Arising from the Identification of the Body	Sir Julius Vogel Award	Best Novella or Novelette	
