= Anna Tambour =

Australian writer

- Occupations: Writer and poet
- Writing career
- Language: English
- Years active: 2001-

Anna Tambour is an author of satire, fable and other strange and hard-to-categorize fiction and poetry.

Her novel Crandolin was shortlisted for the 2013 World Fantasy Award. Tambour's collection Monterra's Deliciosa & Other Tales & was published in 2003, and Spotted Lily, a novel, in 2005. Ebook editions of both of these were published by infinity plus in 2011.

== Reviews ==
Locus listed both Tambour's collections and both novels in their Recommended Reading lists. Her 2015 collection The Finest Ass in the Universe was shortlisted for an Aurealis Award for Best Collection. Spotted Lily was shortlisted in 2006 for the William L. Crawford Fantasy Award, and was recommended for a British Fantasy Society Award (Best Novel). In 2008, The Jeweller of Second-hand Roe won the Aurealis Award for best horror short story.

Tambour lives in the Australian bush, but has lived all over the world and is, in Tambour's words, "of no fixed nationality". In addition to writing fiction, Tambour also writes about and takes photographs of what she calls "magnificants — magnificent insignificants".

== Bibliography ==
=== Novels ===
- Spotted Lily. Canton, OH: Wildside, 2005, ISBN 0-8095-4483-0
  - Spotted Lily. Ebook. Wivenhoe, UK: infinity plus ebooks, 2011, ASIN B004JKNQK8
- Crandolin. Chomu Press, UK: 2012, 987-1-907681-19-6
  - Crandolin. Ebook. Cheeky Frawg Books, Tallahassee, FL, USA, 2016, ASIN B01B264SNK
- Smoke, Paper, Mirrors. Infinity Plus, UK: 2017, ISBN 978-0995752214

=== Short fiction ===
Collections

- Monterra's Deliciosa & Other Tales &. Canton, OH: Prime, 2003, ISBN 1-894815-94-7
  - Monterra's Deliciosa & Other Tales &. Ebook. Wivenhoe, UK: infinity plus ebooks, 2011, ASIN B004JKNQJ4
- The Finest Ass in the Universe. Ticonderoga Publications, Greenwood, WA, Australia, 2015, ISBN 978-1925212150
- The Road to Neozon. Obsidian Sky Books, Detroit, MI, USA, 2018, ISBN 978-1732298002

Selected stories (Note: Short stories unless otherwise noted.)

Title	Year	First published	Reprinted/collected	Notes
The gun between the Veryush and the Cloud Mothers	2015	Tambour, Anna (April–May 2015). "The gun between the Veryush and the Cloud Mothers". Asimov's Science Fiction. 39 (4–5): 96–121.		Novelette
The age of fish, post-flowers	2021	Out of the Ruins, edited by Preston Grassman, Titan Books, 2021, ISBN 978-1789097399		

Bibliography notes
