= Richard Harland =

Australian writer (born 1947)

- Born: Huddersfield, United Kingdom
- Education: BA, English Literature, PhD. Literary Theory
- Occupation: Novelist
- Spouse: Aileen
- Website: richardharland.au

Richard Harland is an Australian fantasy and science fiction writer, academic, and performance artist, living in New South Wales, Australia. He was born in Huddersfield, United Kingdom and migrated to Australia in 1970. Throughout his authorship career, he has published 17 full-length works of fiction, three academic books, short stories and poems.

He is best known for his Eddon and Vail science fiction thriller series, the illustrated Wolf Kingdom series for children and three YA steampunk fantasies: Worldshaker, Liberator and Song of the Slums. He has been awarded the Australian Aurealis Award on six occasions for his fiction.

== Life and academic career ==
Harland completed undergraduate studies for the English major at Cambridge University, and later graduated with a BA. After he earned his Bachelor's degree, he planned an ambitious doctoral thesis that would focus on a global theory of poetry language, and approached numerous universities around the globe seeking funding for his research.

Support was unforthcoming until an offer from the University of Newcastle in New South Wales. He migrated to Australia in 1970 to take advantage of this opportunity. He originally only intended to remain in the country until his PhD was completed, but after some months decided to settle permanently.

Work on his thesis was slow, and he eventually reduced its scope to a MA. For several years, he eventually moved away from his studies, as he worked as a singer, songwriter and poet around Sydney. He published poetry and short stories during this period in a number of literary magazines. He returned to academic life in the 1980s through a tutoring position at the University of New South Wales and continued work on his doctoral thesis, which was published by Methuen (UK) as Superstructuralism: The Philosophy of Structuralism and Post-Structuralism in 1987. The volume sold well, was received well, and secured him a lecturing position in English at the University of Wollongong. Other academic books he published are Beyond Superstructuralism: The Syntagmatic Side of Language (Routledge, UK) and Literary Theory from Plato to Barthes (Macmillan, UK). He taught at (the University of) Wollongong for ten years before resigning to become a full-time fiction writer.

== Fiction writing ==
He scored an early success in childhood with a short story that won a prominent United Kingdom competition. He also wrote and distributed stories while at school, exchanging ongoing installments for sweets and other tokens, when other pupils were reluctant to part with legal tender.

He is best known for several series of novels, but commenced his novel writing career relatively late in life. He had been eager to write full length tales from late childhood but suffered from writer's block, which prevented him making significant headway with novel projects (and also many short stories) for much of the next 25 years. He once attributed his writer's block partly to his belief that he had to write serious literary novels rather than what he found most enjoyable to work on. It was not until writing the comic horror novel The Vicar of Morbing Vyle (1993) that he managed to conquer this obstacle. However he had published short stories prior to this, some of which (along with poetry) were collected in Testimony (1981).

He was still lecturing at Wollongong when he wrote The Dark Edge, the first instalment in the Eddon and Vail series. His senior lecturing role was a secure tenured position, much sought after by other professional scholars. However, with his publisher Pan Macmillan Australia's commission of a sequel to The Dark Edge for the next year, he could not meet the demands of full-time academic life while writing fiction. Despite an uncertain future in a small Australian publication market—where books with relatively low volume sales were considered best-sellers and there were few full-time writers—he resigned from his academic role in 1997 to concentrate on his fiction. He has written full-time since. For many more years, he remained an Honorary Senior Fellow in English at Wollongong, and also taught summer courses on YA fantasy fiction there.

=== Novels ===
Many of Harland's novels contain maps. He has confessed to a fascination with maps: he states that he sometimes spends hours studying them. He has also admitted to often viewing his fictional worlds as though seen from an elevated distance, something he feels is a common feature among fantasy writers.

From the 1999 release of Hidden from View, the final volume to his Eddon and Vail series, every novel has been written either for young adults or children, with the exception of The Black Crusade (2004). Some of his novels have also been adapted into audiobooks.

==== The Vicar series ====
The first volume, The Vicar of Morbing Vyle, was Harland's first published novel. When Karl Evans Publishing started distributing the book, he approached individual booksellers in Brisbane, Canberra, Melbourne and Sydney to promote it. Although out of print, it has since attained a cult status, something he claims was his original hope and dream when marketing the book.

The Black Crusade, a prequel to The Vicar of Morbing Vyle, was released 11 years later in 2004. It describes the journey of the hapless Basil Smorta, a multi lingual bank clerk, who is forced into the company of a group of "fundamental Darwinists" because they've imprisoned the object of his undying love, an Australian singer Volusia, in a mobile iron box. The group travel across Eastern Europe during 1894, and encounter ghosts, blood donating vampires and other comic horror curiosities. The novel shows the origin of the 'vyle' principle, which has descended from the Marquis of Morbol Villica to the Vicar in the first volume in the series. The Black Crusade plays with the notion of the tale's reliability as a factual narrative, including fictional footnotes apparently inserted by the book's publishers, who deplore Basil's actions and despise his unheroic qualities.

The novel was published by Chimaera Publications, which also produces Aurealis, a magazine which publishes and promotes Australian speculative fiction, and originated the Aurealis Awards (although these awards have been administered entirely independently from Chimaera by another organisation since 2004). The novel won an Aurealis Award in both the "Best Horror Novel" and the overarching "Golden Aurealis Best Novel" categories.

==== The Eddon and Vail series ====
In this series of three science fiction novels, there are both detective mystery elements and supernatural elements. Inspector Eddon Brac, a male detective with traditional sleuth leanings, is partnered with assistant Vail ev Vessintor, a goth woman aristocrat with expertise in the psychic sciences. Each novel explores the tension between the pair as they confront murder mysteries of unorthodox and surprising origin.

The series is set against the background of the planet Terra's colonial hegemony: its influence has spread across the cosmos, but is increasingly threatened by the Anti-Human, an unknown menace. The Anti-Human follows a steady path from the boundaries of the universe towards the core, consuming Terran colonies as it advances.

The first volume, The Dark Edge was a finalist for the 1997 Aurealis Award in both the "Horror Novel" and" Science Fiction Novel" categories. The third volume, Hidden from View, was nominated for the 1999 Ditmar Award in the Best Novel category.

==== The Heaven and Earth trilogy ====
This trilogy for young adults is set in Australia 1000 years into the future, and concerns a war between heaven and Earth. Each book includes an 'angelology'.

In preparation for writing the trilogy, Harland extensively researched angels and cosmology, including both the mainstream and unorthodox sources of Christian, Islamic and Judaic lore on the subjects. He was particularly concerned to present angels as awe inspiring, beautiful and numinous beings. He liked to have angels possess personalities that allow for the reader to empathise, yet be far removed from 'Disney-fied' images of sweetness-and-light. The first book he read on angels was A Dictionary of Angels by American poet Gustav Davidson. He returned to this book numerous times since to help with inspiration for all the books in the trilogy. He has also stated that the Ghent Altarpiece by Jan van Eyck greatly assisted in creating his vision of heaven.

==== The Wolf Kingdom series ====
The series comprises four illustrated fantasy books. They are aimed at older pre-adolescents, commencing with Escape! and completed by The Heavy Crown, all published in 2008. Harland wrote the story, and Laura Peterson provided (mostly full page) illustrations for each chapter. Each tale functions as a self-contained narrative, but the series also interlinks as a larger story arc.

The books were launched in association with the Children's Book Council of Australia.

A race of talking, bipedal wolves have overrun and enslaved humankind, leaving only a determined resistance, known as the "Free Folk", who shelter in a subterranean refuge and plot to liberate themselves from their overlords. The revelation unfolded over the larger story arc turns upon the mystery of how these creatures have risen from their former animal state, to become oppressive rulers of humankind. The books focus on two children, a brother and sister, whose parents are taken by the wolves, and who subsequently join the "Free Folk" and become key to the success of the rebellion. Harland was long fascinated with wolves. He credits this obsession to a childhood experience in the UK, when he passed an ominous wood named 'Wolves Wood' on daily basis in a school bus. This left a marked impression upon him.

The series won the 2008 Aurealis Award for the "best children's illustrated work/picture book" category. In awarding the series an Aurealis, the judges acknowledged the dual work of Harland and his illustrator partner, Peterson: "The illustrations help to bring alive aspects of the story – muscular pictures for a muscular tale. Laura Peterson has shown attention to detail in all the artwork pertaining to the wolves and helps to support the atmosphere of peril that Richard Harland has created."

==== Other children's fiction ====
- Walter Wants to Be a Werewolf (2003)

It is part of the Aussie Chomps series aimed at teenagers. Walter is a young member of a family of werewolves, but struggles to manifest true werewolf characteristics when the full moon rises. Subsequently visits a doctor hoping to find a cure for his condition.

- Sassycat: The Night of the Dead (2005)

Published by Scholastic, the novel is mostly in the voice of Sassycat, a truly superior cat. She moves to a new home with her mistress/carer, Rebecca, and does not think much of her new animal neighbours. But she has to work with them in order to defeat the ghosts who are invading their territory from a nearby cemetery.

==== Worldshaker, Liberator, Song of the Slums ====
Harland's series of YA steampunk novels commenced with Worldshaker, partly inspired by the works of Mervyn Peake and Charles Dickens. It was released in May 2009 in Australia, then in the United States, UK, France, Germany and Brazil. The main inspiration for this book was the dream he had which is now one of the scenes in the book. The principal character is Col, who lives in the privileged upper sections of a mountain-sized city-ship. He has been selected to become the next commander of the craft, but is forced to question his world when a girl who has escaped from the lower decks, seeks his help and reveals to him the poverty and exploitation below the elite world of his upbringing. The novel sold to American publisher Simon & Schuster for a substantial advance.

The story bears a resemblance to the plot of the 1927 film Metropolis. Both feature a young male heir to a position of power in an unfair class-based society, with a young woman of the worker class teaming together with the young man to overthrow the cruel establishment.

Harland began developing the ideas for Worldshaker in the mid-1990s and took five years to write the novel, passing through 3 complete rewrites. It was first entitled Leviathan, later Juggernaught, before finally being published as Worldshaker. The sequel to Worldshaker was published globally by the same publishers as Liberator.

For his third steampunk novel, Harland shifted the setting to an earlier period in the same world, later than the Napoleonic invasion of England (by a tunnel which was planned, but never built, in real history), but before the launching of the great city-ships or juggernauts. The principal character is Astor, who starts out from a refined and privileged background and ends up in the incredibly polluted, fog-bound slums of 'London Town'. There she falls in with a gang and discovers a talent as a drummer playing a new kind of rhythmical music—which is essentially rock 'n roll—only a century before Elvis and Bill Haley. The novels tells the story of the triumph of 'gang music' and the rise to popularity of Astor's band. It also contains a subplot to take power by a group of oligarchs, and explores Astor's relationship with the enigmatic Verrol.

==== The Ferren trilogy ====
Ferren and the Angel, a dystopian YA novel published by IFWG Publishing in 2023, is the first book in the Ferren trilogy and a rewritten version of the novel first published in the Heaven and Earth trilogy.

The setting is the far future, when only scattered ruins remain from the civilization of the present. While artificially created beings called "Humen" conduct an endless war against Heaven, descendants of the original human beings have been reduced to a degraded existence, surviving in ignorance in isolated tribes.

Fifteen-year-old Ferren belongs to a tribe called "the People". Like other tribes, the People consider themselves allies of the Humen, although they go in fear of them. Especially terrifying are the black-clad Selectors who select one tribal member for "military service" each year.

Ferren’s life changes when he sees a "Celestial" shot down and crashing to the Earth. He investigates and finds the angel Miriael, semi-conscious and awaiting extinction. Feeling pity for his tribe’s supposed enemy, he feeds her mortal food and thereby "corrupts" her spiritual purity, even as he enables her to live in the terrestrial atmosphere.

From Miriael, Ferren learns truths about the nature of his world. Then, after being temporarily exiled by the People, he ventures into the military-industrial complex of the Humen Camp and learns the truth about "military service". In the end, his relationship with Miriael proves crucial in protecting his tribe through the cataclysmic violence of a great terra-celestial battle.

=== Shorter works of fiction ===
Harland has published over 20 short stories and novellas in magazines and anthologies in the United States, Australia, Canada and France. His work has been included in 'best of' anthologies such as Dreaming Again, Dreaming in the Dark and Ghosts by Gaslight, compiled by American editor and anthologist, Jack Dann, The Best Horror of the Year, (ed Ellen Datlow, US), Year's Best Fantasy 9 (ed Hartwell and Cramer, US), Year's Best Australian Science Fiction & Fantasy 4 (ed Congreve and Marquardt), The Year's Best Australian Fantasy & Horror 2011 (ed Grzyb and Helene), and in France, Ténebres 2007, (ed Benoit Domis). Several of his stories have received honourable mentions in the Year's Best Fantasy and Horror anthologies, edited by Ellen Datlow & Terri Windling. His shorter fiction has been both nominated for and won Australian speculative fiction awards.
