= Trent Jamieson =

Australian writer of speculative fiction

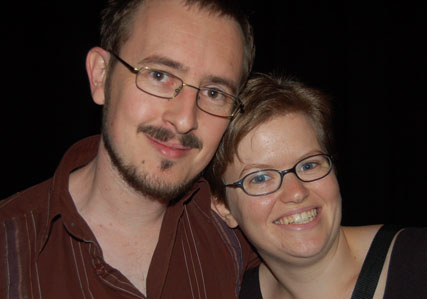
- Trent Jamieson with Grace Dugan at the 2007 Aurealis Awards.
- Occupations: Writer, bookseller, teacher
- Writing career
- Period: 1994–present
- Genre: Speculative fiction
- Website: www.trentjamieson.com.au

Trent Jamieson is an Australian writer of speculative fiction.

== Biography ==
Jamieson was first published in 1994 with the short story "Threnody" which was published in the winter edition Eidolon (Australian magazine). In 2003 Jamieson was nominated for the Ditmar Award for best professional achievement but lost to Jonathan Strahan. In 2005 Jamieson won the Aurealis Award for best science fiction short story with his story "Slow and Ache". In 2008 he won his second Aurealis Award. "Cracks" won the Aurealis Award for best young-adult short story, beating works by Deborah Biancotti, Dirk Flinthart and Kevin MacLean. In 2010 his first novel, Death Most Definite, was published by Orbit Books and was nominated for the Aurealis Award for best horror novel and the Aurealis Award for best fantasy novel. Death Most Definite is the first part of the Death Works series and was followed by a sequel Managing Death in early 2011. Jamieson is currently writing a duology for Angry Robot Books and the third novel in the Death Works series.

Jamieson is a former teacher at Clarion South Writers Workshop and is a seasonal academic at the Queensland University of Technology. He is also a former editor for the magazine Redsine. Jamieson currently lives in Brisbane, Queensland, Australia and works at The Avid Reader Bookshop.

== Awards and nominations ==
Year	Work	Award	Category	Result	Ref.
2003	—	Ditmar Award	Australian Professional Achievement	Nomination	
2005	"Slow and Ache"	Aurealis Award	Science Fiction Short Story	Won	
2008	"Cracks"	Aurealis Award	Young Adult Short Story	Won	
2008	"Day Boy"	Aurealis Award	Horror Short Story	Nomination	
2008	"Delivery"	Aurealis Award	Science Fiction Short Story	Nomination	
2010	Death Most Definite	Aurealis Award	Fantasy Novel	Nomination	
2010	Death Most Definite	Aurealis Award	Horror Novel	Nomination	

== Bibliography ==
=== Novels ===
Death Works

- Death Most Definite (2010)
- Managing Death (2011)
- The Business of Death (September 2011)

Other

- Roil (30 August 2011)
- Night's Engines (2012)
- Day Boy (2015)
- The Stone Road (2022)

=== Short fiction ===
- "Threnody" (1994) in Eidolon Winter 1994 (ed. Jonathan Strahan, Jeremy G. Byrne)
- "Naked" (1999) in Altair No. 3 (ed. Robert N. Stephenson, Jim Deed, Andrew Collings)
- "Carousel" (2000) in Aurealis #25/26 (ed. Dirk Strasser, Stephen Higgins)
- "A Thief Is a King in the Halls of the Night" (2001) in AustrAlien Absurdities (ed. Chuck McKenzie, Tansy Rayner Roberts)
- "Tar Baby" (2002) in Agog! Fantastic Fiction (ed. Cat Sparks)
- "The Catling God" (2002) in Andromeda Spaceways Inflight Magazine No. 1 (ed. Ben Payne)
- "Wind Down" (2002) in Aurealis No. 30 (ed. Keith Stevenson)
- "Endure" (2004) in Agog! Smashing Stories (ed. Cat Sparks)
- "Don't Got No Wings" (2004) in Encounters (ed. Maxine McArthur, Donna Maree Hanson)
- "Generous Furniture" (2004) in Glass Onion (ed. D. F. Lewis)
- "Porcelain Salli" (2004) in Aurealis #33–35, (ed. Keith Stevenson)
- "Five Bells" (2005) in Daikaiju! Giant Monster Tales (ed. Robin Pen, Robert Hood)
- "Tumble" (2005) in Australian Dark Fantasy and Horror 2006 (ed. Shane Jiraiya Cummings, Angela Challis)
- "Neighbours" (2005) in The Devil in Brisbane (ed. Zoran Zivkovic)
- "Slow and Ache" (2005) in Aurealis No. 36 (ed. Ben Payne, Robert Hoge)
- "Marco's Tooth" (2006) in Andromeda Spaceways Inflight Magazine No. 22 (ed. Tansy Rayner Roberts)
- "Cracks" (2008) in Shiny No. 2
- "Delivery" (2008) in Cosmos Magazine June–July 2008 (ed. Damien Broderick, Wilson da Silva)
- "The New Deal" (2008) in Dreaming Again (ed. Jack Dann)
- "The Lighterman's Tale" (2009) in Canterbury 2100: Pilgrimages in a New World (ed. Dirk Flinthart)
- "The Neighbourhood of Dead Monsters" (2009) in Aurealis No. 42 (ed. Stuart Mayne)
- "Iron Temple" (2009) in X6 (ed. Keith Stevenson)
- "Temptation" (2010) in Scenes from the Second Storey (ed. Amanda Pillar, Pete Kempshall)

=== Anthologies ===
- Fantastical Journeys to Brisbane (2008) edited with Geoffrey Maloney and Zoran Zivkovic

=== Collections ===
- Reserved for Travelling Shows (2006)

=== Children's Books ===
- The Giant and the Sea (2020)
- Mr Impoppable (2023)

=== Editor contributions ===
- Redsine, fiction editor for the magazine
- The Etched City (2003), a novel by K. J. Bishop
