= Elsewhere (anthology) =

Short story anthology

- Elsewhere first edition cover.
- Author: Michael Barry (editor)
- Cover artist: Les Petersen
- Language: English
- Genre: Speculative fiction anthology
- Publisher: CSFG Publishing
- Publication date: October 2003
- Publication place: Australia
- Media type: Print (Paperback)
- Pages: 218 pp (first edition)
- ISBN: 0-9581390-1-6

Elsewhere: An Anthology of Incredible Places is the third short story anthology published by the Canberra Speculative Fiction Guild. Printed in 2003 and edited by Michael Barry, it contains stories from several Australian speculative fiction authors.

== Background ==
Elsewhere was first published in Australia in October 2003 by CSFG Publishing. It was a short-list nominee for the 2004 Ditmar Award for best collected work but lost to Agog! Terrific Tales, edited by Cat Sparks. Elsewhere features 26 stories by 26 authors, with two of the stories featured receiving nominations. "Alien Space Nazis Must Die" by Chuck McKenzie was a finalist for the 2004 Ditmar Award for best novella or novelette but lost to "La Sentinelle" by Lucy Sussex and "State of Oblivion" by Kaaron Warren was a short-list nominee for the 2004 Aurealis Award for best science fiction short story but lost to Brendan Duffy's "Louder Echo".

== Contents ==
- Interior artwork by Les Petersen
- Introduction by Michael Barry
- "One Rainy Sunday in a Circus Far Away" short story by Craig Cormick
- "Devil in the Text" short story by Richard Harland
- "Orion's Womb" short story by Carol Ryles
- "Web of Reality" short story by Alison Venugoban
- "Widdershins" short story by Stuart Barrow
- "The Surge" short story by Cory Daniells
- "Kidnapping" short story by Euan Bowen
- "617 Instances of Eleanor and Rising" short story by Robert Hoge
- "Merrie Dawn" short story by Chris Andrews
- "The Recipe" short story by Ben Peek
- "City, Seen by Lightning" short story by Dave Luckett
- "Armageddon Café" short story by Mik Bennett
- "State of Oblivion" short story by Kaaron Warren
- "Heritage Planet" short story by David Walker
- "Night Watch" short story by Jay d'Argo
- "The Birdcage" short story by Cat Sparks
- "Chance Meetings" short story by Robbie Matthews
- "Impossible Railways" short story by Zara Baxter
- "Sword of Liberation" short story by Maxine McArthur
- "Run the Program" short story by Nicole R. Murphy
- "Alien Space Nazis Must Die!" short story by Chuck McKenzie
- "The Hero and the Swordsmith" short story by Tessa Kum
- "Oilcan Sam" short story by Scott Hopkins
- "The Mind of the Almighty" short story by Anna Key
- "Other" short story by Donna Maree Hanson
- "A Stone to Mark My Passing" short story by Lee Battersby

== See also ==
- Nor of Human, a 2001 anthology edited by Geoffrey Maloney
- Machinations: An Anthology of Ingenious Designs, a 2002 anthology edited by Chris Andrews
- Encounters (anthology), a 2004 anthology edited by Maxine McArthur and Donna Maree Hanson
- Gastronomicon, a 2005 anthology edited by Stuart Barrow
- The Grinding House, a 2005 anthology edited by Donna Maree Hanson
- The Outcast (anthology), a 2006 anthology edited by Nicole R. Murphy
- Body of Work, a 2023 anthology edited by C. Z. Tacks
