= Alma Books =

British publishing house

- Founded: 2005
- Founder: Alessandro Gallenzi and Elisabetta Minervini
- Country of origin: United Kingdom
- Headquarters location: London
- Distribution: Macmillan Distribution (UK); Bloomsbury Publishing (Australia, India, United States); Raincoast Books (Canada); Pansing (Singapore)
- Publication types: Books
- Imprints: Alma Classics, Overture Publishing
- Official website: www.almabooks.com

Alma Books is a publishing house based in Richmond, London, founded in 2005 by Alessandro Gallenzi and Elisabetta Minervini, the founders of Hesperus Press. It publishes mainly fiction, both by authors from the English-speaking world and in translation from languages such as French, German, Italian, Russian, Spanish and Japanese.

It has published books by authors such as Anthony McCarten, Robert M. Pirsig, William T. Vollmann, Colson Whitehead, Jane Hawking, Tibor Fischer, Tom McCarthy, Carmen Posadas, Yasutaka Tsutsui, Alberto Manguel, Peter Benson, Rosie Alison and Giuseppe Tomasi di Lampedusa, among others. In 2012 Alma published Blooms of Darkness by Aharon Appelfeld, which won the Independent Foreign Fiction Prize.

In 2007 Alma Books launched Oneworld Classics, a joint venture with the Oxford-based publishing house Oneworld Publications, which published newly commissioned classics titles and acquired Calder Publications. In 2012, Alma Books acquired full stakes in Oneworld Classics, which was renamed Alma Classics. In the same year Alma Books received the Premio Nazionale per la Traduzione by the Italian Ministero per i Beni e le Attività Culturali for their contribution to the promotion of Italian culture abroad. Since the award's inauguration in 1989, it had never before been awarded to a British publisher.

In 2013 Alma Books won the Bookseller Independent Publisher of the Year Industry Award.
