= Less Than Human =

Less Than Human may refer to:

- Less Than Human (album), a 2005 album by The Juan MacLean
- Less Than Human (novel), a 2004 science fiction novel by Maxine McArthur
- "Less than Human", a single on The Chameleons' 1983 album Script of the Bridge
