= Geoffrey Maloney =

Australian writer

- Writing career
- Genre: Speculative fiction short fiction
- Notable awards: Aurealis Award; Best fantasy short story 2000 "The World According to Kipling (A Plain Tale from the Hills)"

Geoffrey Maloney is an Australian writer of speculative short fiction.

== Biography ==
Maloney's first story, "5 Cigarettes and 2 Snakes", was published in 1990 in Aurealis No. 1. In 1997 Maloney's "The Embargo Traders" was nominated for Aurealis Award for best science fiction short story. Along with Maxine McArthur and others, he helped set up the Canberra Speculative Fiction Guild in 1999. This produced the anthology Nor of Human... An Anthology of Fantastic Creatures with Maloney as the editor. In 2001 he won the 2000 Aurealis Award for best fantasy short story for "The World According to Kipling (A Plain Tale from the Hills)". Maloney has since received four other nominations at the Aurealis Awards and two at the Ditmar Awards.

He currently lives in Brisbane with his wife and three children.

== Bibliography ==
=== Anthologies ===
- Nor of Human... An Anthology of Fantastic Creatures (2001) (as editor, part of the Canberra Speculative Fiction Guild Anthologies)
- Fantastical Journeys to Brisbane (2008) (with Trent Jamieson & Zoran Živković)

=== Collections ===
- Tales from the Crypto-System (2005)

=== Essays ===
- Speculative Fiction Reaches Critical Mass in Canberra? Surely Not! (2001)
- Notes on Authors (Nor of Human... An Anthology of Fantastic Creatures) (2001)

=== Short fiction ===
- "5 Cigarettes and 2 Snakes" (1990) in Aurealis No. 1
- "Age of Democracy" (1990) in Eidolon (Australian magazine), Spring 1990
- "The Last Lion in Africa is Dead" (1991) in Eidolon (Australian magazine), Summer 1991
- "Cock of the Dunghill" (1991) in Eidolon (Australian magazine), Winter 1991
- "Green on Red" (1991) in Eidolon (Australian magazine), Spring 1991
- "Meat Puppets" (1992) in Intimate Armageddons (ed. Bill Congreve)
- "Requiem for the General" (1992) in Eidolon (Australian magazine), Summer 1992
- "Greening" (1992) in Eidolon (Australian magazine), Autumn 1992
- "The Taxi-Driver" (1992) in Aurealis No. 8
- "The Shifting Sands of the Interior" (1992) in Tales from the Crypto-System
- "Memories of the Colour-Field" (1992) in Eidolon (Australian magazine), Spring 1992
- "Moving with the Herd" (1992) in Aurealis No. 9
- "Remnants of the Virago Crypto-System" (1995) in The Silver Web, Summer 1995
- "The Embargo Traders" (1995) in Aurealis No. 16
- "Keeping the Motor Running" (1998) in Aurealis #20/21
- "Keeping the Meter Running" (1998) in Tales from the Crypto-System
- "The Parallax Garden (1999) in Tales from the Crypto-System
- "Green-Keeping" (1999) in Tales from the Crypto-System
- "In the Service of the Shogarth" (1999) in Tales from the Crypto-System
- "The Elephant Sways as it Walks" (2000) in Eidolon (Australian magazine), No.29/30, Autumn 2000
- "The World According To Kipling" (2000) in Tales from the Crypto-System
- "Hotel Terminus" (2000) in Tales from the Crypto-System
- "The World According to Kipling (A Plain Tale from the Hills)" (2000) in Aurealis #25/26
- "The Imperfect Instantaneous People Mover" (2001) in Agog! Fantastic Fiction (ed. Cat Sparks)
- "Remembering Aoteoroa" (2001) in Orb Speculative Fiction No. 2, 2001
- "Elecktra Dreams" (2002) in Redsine Eight (ed. Garry Nurrish)
- "The Kaladashi Covenant" (2003) in Andromeda Spaceways Inflight Magazine, Issue No. 6
- "A Sixpence for Sophie" (2003) in Southern Blood: New Australian Tales of the Supernatural (ed. Bill Congreve)
- "Birds of the Brushes and Scrubs" (2004) in The Year's Best Australian Science Fiction & Fantasy: Volume One (ed. Bill Congreve, Michelle Marquardt)
- "Conversations with Eternity" (2004) in Orb Speculative Fiction No. 6, 2004
- "The Dust Beneath Her Feet" (2004) in Aurealis #33–35
- "Bush of Ghosts" (2005) in Tales from the Crypto-System
- "A Very Long War" (2005) in Tales from the Crypto-System
- "A Colombian Breakfast" (2005) in Tales from the Crypto-System
- "The Writer Who Could Have Been Dostoyevsky" (2005) in The Devil in Brisbane (ed. Zoran Živković)
- "When the World Was Flat" (2006) in Agog! Ripping Reads (ed. Cat Sparks)
- "The Mana Bar Kid" (2006) in Andromeda Spaceways Inflight Magazine, Issue No. 25
- ""P" is for Power Station" (2007) in Fantastic Wonder Stories (ed. Russell B. Farr)
- "Blonde on Blonde" (2007) in Albedo One No. 33
- "The Catherine Wheel" (2007) in New Writings in the Fantastic (ed. John Grant)
- "The Secret Life of Mars" (2008) in Barren Worlds (ed. Eric T. Reynolds)
- "In the Kaladashi Fashion" (2008) in Andromeda Spaceways Inflight Magazine, Issue No. 35
- "Through a Lens Darkly" (2009) in Aurealis No. 42

=== As editor ===
- Doorways for the Dispossessed (2006) (with Paul Haines)

== Awards and nominations ==
Aurealis Awards

- Best fantasy short story
  - 2000: Win: "The World According to Kipling (A Plain Tale from the Hills)"
- Best science fiction short story
  - 1996: Nomination: "The Embargo Traders"
  - 2002: Nomination: "The Imperfect Instantaneous People Mover"
  - 2003: Nomination: "Bush of Ghosts"
- Convenors' award
  - 2001: Nomination: for Nor of Human... An Anthology of Fantastic Creatures, as editor
  - 2004: Nomination: for himself

Ditmar Awards

- Best collected work
  - 2007: Nomination: Doorways for the Dispossessed (with Paul Haines)
- Professional achievement
  - 2004: Nomination: Tales of the Crypto-System
