= The Outcast (anthology) =

First edition Cover art by Les Peterson

The Outcast is the seventh short story anthology published by the Canberra Speculative Fiction Guild. Printed in 2006 and edited by Nicole R. Murphy, it contains stories from several Australian speculative fiction authors.

== Stories ==
The collection contains the following stories:

- The Future Gun by Shane M Brown
- Things of Beauty by Susan Wardle
- Sacrifice for the Nation by Monica Carroll
- Woman Train by Kaaron Warren
- Bakemono by Maxine McArthur
- The Fallen by Mik Bennett
- The Returned Soldier by Siobhan Bailey
- Awakening the Spirit by Kylie Seluka
- Twisted Beliefs by Cory Daniells
- Blue Stars for All Saviors' Day by Cat Sparks
- $ave G@1axy F@$t! by Steven Cavanagh
- Holding Out for a Hero by Tansy Rayner Roberts
- Watcher by Ross Hamilton
- An Offer Too True To Be Good by Andrew Sullivan
- The Mudfish Goddess by A.M. Muffaz
- The Rubbish Witch by Lily Chrywenstrom
- The Little Wooden Flute by Robert Hoge
- On The Way to Habassan by Richard Harland
- Lead Us Out of the Wilderness by David L Kok
- Mine by Martin Livings

All stories are illustrated by Brian Smith. The cover art is by Les Petersen.

ISBN 0-9775192-0-1

== See also ==
- Nor of Human
- Elsewhere
- Encounters
- The Grinding House
