= Encounters (anthology) =

2004 science fiction short story collection

Encounters (cover by Les Petersen)

Encounters is the fourth short story anthology published by the Canberra Speculative Fiction Guild. Printed in 2004 and edited by Maxine McArthur and Donna Maree Hanson, it contains stories from Australian speculative fiction authors (ISBN 0-9581390-2-4).

== Stories ==
The anthology includes these stories:

- "Vortle" by Lee Battersby
- "The Souvenir" by Richard Harland
- "Don't Got No Wings" by Trent Jamieson
- "Stella's Transformation" by Kim Westwood
- "Guarding the Mound" by Kaaron Warren
- "Meltdown my Plutonium Heart" by Cat Sparks
- "Happy Faces For Happy Families" by Gillian Polack

A review in SF Site said "Over the past several years, Australia has been exporting numerous speculative fiction authors...The anthologies of the Canberra Speculative Fiction Guild provide another outlet for these talents, some raw, some seasoned, to make their voices heard."

== See also ==
- Nor of Human
- Elsewhere
- The Outcast
- The Grinding House
