= Slights (novel) =

2009 novel by Kaaron Warren

- First edition cover
- Author: Kaaron Warren
- Language: English
- Genre: Horror fiction
- Publisher: HarperCollins / Angry Robot
- Publication date: July 2009
- Publication place: United Kingdom / Australia
- Media type: Print (paperback original)
- Pages: 528
- Awards: Australian Shadows Awards for Best Long Fiction; Australian Ditmar Award for Best Novel
- ISBN: 978-0-00-732242-8

Slights is a 2009 horror novel by Australian writer Kaaron Warren. It is her debut novel and is about a woman who withdraws from society and has near-death experiences in which she enters a dark room where she is tormented by people she had previously slighted. It was first published as a paperback original and e-book in the United Kingdom and Australia in July 2009 by Angry Robot, an offshoot of HarperCollins, and in the United States by Angry Robot in September 2010.

In general Slights was well received by critics, and went on to win the 2009 Australian Shadows Award for Best Long Fiction, and the 2010 Australian Ditmar Award for Best Novel.

== Plot ==
Slights is a first-person narrative by a troubled woman, Stevie, who lost her father when she was nine, and her mother when she was 18. Her father, a police officer, was killed during a mysterious shooting incident on the job, and her mother died when Stevie crashed their car while driving recklessly. The accident left Stevie badly injured and she had a near-death experience in which she found herself in a dark room filled with angry people threatening her. Usually nothing frightened Stevie, but that room terrified her, and she was relieved when she was revived in hospital.

From an early age Stevie was anti-social and soon earned herself a bad reputation. After her mother's death she had the house to herself and began digging in the backyard, an activity her father had often indulged in. She stopped cleaning the house, and herself, and berated and abused most people she encountered. Her indifference to herself and others led to a suicide attempt when she was 21. She returned to that dark room filled with angry people clawing and tearing at her, and she was very grateful when someone found her unconscious and took her to hospital. While the room frightened her, she was intrigued by it and realised that the people in it were those she had slighted at some point in her life. She wanted to find out what other people's rooms were like and took a job at a local hospice to be close to people near death, but was frustrated when she could not get the information she wanted. Then she resorted to picking up strangers and bringing them home. She would get them drunk or drug them, and start killing them, but revive them as they lost consciousness so she could interrogate them. She never got much out of them and they all died. She buried the bodies in the backyard amongst her father's secrets. Stevie's backyard excavations had uncovered toys and trinkets from her childhood, but also objects she had never seen before, and bones.

Indifference to life and fascination with death led to several more suicide attempts and trips to her dark room. Each time Stevie was discovered and revived. But when she was 35 she hung herself and no one found her in time to save her. She had learnt that her father had been under investigation for the deaths of several people, and with the reported disappearances of those she had murdered, it was only a matter of time before the police arrived at her house. For a very long time she lay in her dark room and endured the biting and scratching of those she had slighted. Then suddenly her tormentors were finished with her and left the room, and after a while Stevie heard her mother and father's voices and she began to rise along a "golden path".

== Background ==
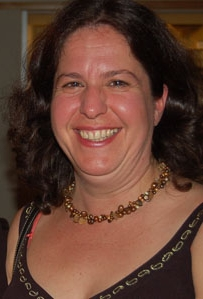
Kaaron Warren, 2007

Kaaron Warren is an Australian born author currently living in Fiji. She began her literary career writing short stories, and won several awards, including the Australian Ditmar and Aurealis Awards. Her short story collection, The Grinding House won the 2006 ACT Writing and Publishing Awards. Her first published story, "White Bed" was later dramatised for the stage, and the short film, Patience was based on her story, "A Positive".

Warren began Slights as a short story, but as the main character Stevie developed, she found herself writing a "far deeper story" than she had intended, and it grew into her first novel. Stevie was originally male (Steve) but Warren made him female when she realised she could make the character more believable as a woman. Warren said that she wanted to convey the possibility that each person creates their "own version of hell". As a child she had seen pictures of different hells, depending on your sin, in a Hare Krishna text book, and these images had remained with her ever since. While working on Slights, she also wrote "The Speaker of Heaven", a short story about different versions of heaven.

== Reception ==
Martin Livings of the Australian Horror Writers Association wrote in his Long Fiction Report for the 2009 Australian Shadows Award that Slights is "an extraordinary achievement". He described the book as "an intimate portrait of an awful person", who after a broken childhood, never grows up and is unable to have meaningful relationships with others. Livings said it is "a punch in the face, a kick in the testicles" and will remain with you for a "long, long time".

Publishers Weekly selected Slights as its "Pick of the Week" in August 2009, and said that Warren "manipulates Stevie’s voice to create a portrait of horror that in no way reads like a first novel". Ariel Berg wrote in the San Francisco Book Review that while Stevie is an "antisocial ... sociopath" who is "virtually impossible to like", Warren does instil some sympathy for her protagonist by suggesting that Stevie cannot control or understand her actions. Berg felt that the book's plot is a little thin and that Stevie’s misfortunes tend to become repetitive, but added her ramblings do "crawl under your skin".

Slights won the 2009 Australian Shadows Award for Best Long Fiction, and the 2010 Australian Ditmar Award for Best Novel.

== Work cited ==
- Warren, Kaaron (2009). Slights (EPUB ed.). HarperCollins. ISBN 978-0-00-733299-1.
