= The World According to Kipling (A Plain Tale from the Hills) =

- Short story by Geoffrey Maloney
- Country: Australia
- Language: English
- Genre: Fantasy

Publication
- Published in: Aurealis #25/26
- Publication type: Periodical
- Publisher: Chimaera Publications
- Media type: Print (Magazine)
- Publication date: October 2000

"The World According to Kipling (A Plain Tale from the Hills)" is a 2000 fantasy short story by Australian writer Geoffrey Maloney.

"The World According to Kipling (A Plain Tale from the Hills)" was first published in October 2000 in the 25th/26th edition of the Aurealis magazine by Chimaera Publications. It was published alongside nine other stories by the authors John Higgins, Michael Pryor, Trent Jamieson, Simon Ng, Alistair Ong, Adam Browne, Kathryn Dean, Stephen Higgins, and Anthony Morris. In 2003 it was republished in Wonder Years: The Ten Best Stories from a Decade Past, edited by Peter McNamara and published by MirrorDanse Books. "The World According to Kipling (A Plain Tale from the Hills)" won the 2000 Aurealis Award for best fantasy short story.
