= Nor of Human =

Book by Geoffrey Maloney

Nor of Human--cover by Les Petersen

Nor of Human: An Anthology of Fantastic Creatures is the first short story anthology published by the Canberra Speculative Fiction Guild. Printed in 2001 under ISBN 0-646-41393-7 and edited by Geoffrey Maloney, it contains stories from several Australian speculative fiction authors.

The anthology was one of the first projects the newly founded CSFG embarked on, as a way to provide a focus for members' activities and as a showcase for their work. The theme of "fantastic creatures" was inspired by a guest speaker at one of the Guild meetings, the Australian cryptozoologist known as "Tim the Yowie Man", and two of the anthology stories feature yowies (a creature roughly comparable to the American Bigfoot). The book was launched by SF writer Jack Dann.

The book was shortlisted for four Aurealis Awards: "The Trojan Rocks", "Tales from the True Desert" and "Happy Birthday To Me" were listed for the science fiction, fantasy and horror categories respectively while Geoffrey Maloney was shortlisted for his work in editing the collection. Although the shortlist performance was strong the book did not take out the awards themselves.

The collection is "Dedicated to all the creators of speculative fiction, past, present and future; whether or not of human…" All stories in the collection are illustrated by Les Petersen.

== Stories ==
The collection contains the following stories:

- The Trojan Rocks by Michael Barry
- Wyvern's Blood by Chris Andrews
- Cacachatol by Peter Barrett
- Tales From The True Desert by Matthew Farrer
- Playing Possum by Maxine McArthur
- Fringe Dwellers by Robbie Matthews
- Perfect Parasite by Carole Nomarhas
- Sasquatch Winter by Les Petersen
- Quacaha by Allan Price
- Claw by Paul Ryan
- Flap by Antony Searle
- Stark Raving Mad by Geoff Skellams
- Camp Yowie by Krystle and Mark Snitch
- Happy Birthday to Me by Alison Venugoban

== See also ==
- Elsewhere
- Encounters
- Gastronomicon
- Machinations: An Anthology of Ingenious Designs
- The Grinding House
- The Outcast
- Body of Work
