= Angry Robot =

British publisher of SF and fantasy

- Parent company: Watkins Media
- Founded: 2008
- Country of origin: United Kingdom
- Headquarters location: Nottingham
- Distribution: Penguin Random House (US); Grantham Book Services (UK); Simon & Schuster (Australia); Pansing (Singapore)
- Publication types: books
- Fiction genres: Science fiction and fantasy
- Official website: www.angryrobotbooks.com

Angry Robot is a British-based publishing house dedicated to producing modern adult science fiction and fantasy, or as they call it “SF, F and WTF?!?”. The Nottingham-based company first released books in the UK in 2009, and since September 2010 has simultaneously been publishing its titles in the US as well, as a distributed client of Random House. All titles are released as paperbacks and eBooks.

== History ==
Angry Robot was founded in August 2008, when Marc Gascoigne, previously publisher of Games Workshop’s Black Library and Solaris imprints, was hired by HarperCollins UK to create a new science fiction imprint. The intention was to create an experimental line that would complement the existing Voyager imprint, which focussed mainly on big-selling fantasy titles. Angry Robot would be able to trial some different business methods – buying world rights to allow co-publishing in the US and UK, issuing eBooks and potentially audiobooks as standard alongside print editions, and maximising online marketing through bloggers, Twitter and Facebook.

Editor Lee Harris, previously best known for Hub, an online short story magazine, was recruited at the start of 2009. The first titles published by the imprint, released in July of that year, were Slights by Kaaron Warren and Moxyland by Lauren Beukes. Both met with praise (Slights won the Australian Ditmar Award for best novel, and the Shadows Award for Best Fiction). The company continued to release two or three titles every month, but in April 2010, book production was temporarily halted when HarperCollins and the imprint parted.

Gascoigne purchased the imprint from HarperCollins for a nominal sum, in partnership with Oxford-based Osprey Publishing. The imprint remained based in Nottingham. The monthly release of new titles resumed in September of that year, with titles publishing in the US as well as the UK for the first time.

Among the first titles in the new wave of release was Lauren Beukes’ Zoo City, which went on to win the Arthur C. Clarke Award for best science fiction book of the year in April 2011. The novel was also nominated for a British Science Fiction Association Award (it came second, but its cover art – by Joey HiFi - won a separate BSFA Award) and a World Fantasy Award. Also notable was a reprint of K. W. Jeter’s pair of seminal steampunk novels, Morlock Night and Infernal Devices.

The imprint makes great capital out of its “Robot Army”, which is a street team of bloggers, reviewers and influential commentators from the science fiction world, who can access exclusive content and advance reading copies of Angry Robot’s novels. Angry Robot also uses its quirky branding to sell merchandise and eBooks (either singly or in multiples via ongoing subscriptions) direct to readers.

In October 2011, at the World Fantasy Convention, Marc Gascoigne won the World Fantasy Special Award (Professional) for Angry Robot.

== Strange Chemistry and Exhibit A ==
In November 2011, Angry Robot announced that they were planning a sister imprint, Strange Chemistry, that would be devoted to young adult (teen) science fiction, fantasy and supernatural novels. Headed by blogger-turned-editor Amanda Rutter, it was launched in September 2012.

A crime fiction imprint, Exhibit A, was launched in 2014.

Both Strange Chemistry and Exhibit A imprints were closed in June 2014, after they were "unable to carve out their own niches".

== Sale ==
In 2014 Angry Robot was sold by Osprey to Watkins Media, owned by Etan Ilfeld.
