= Kaaron Warren =

Australian writer

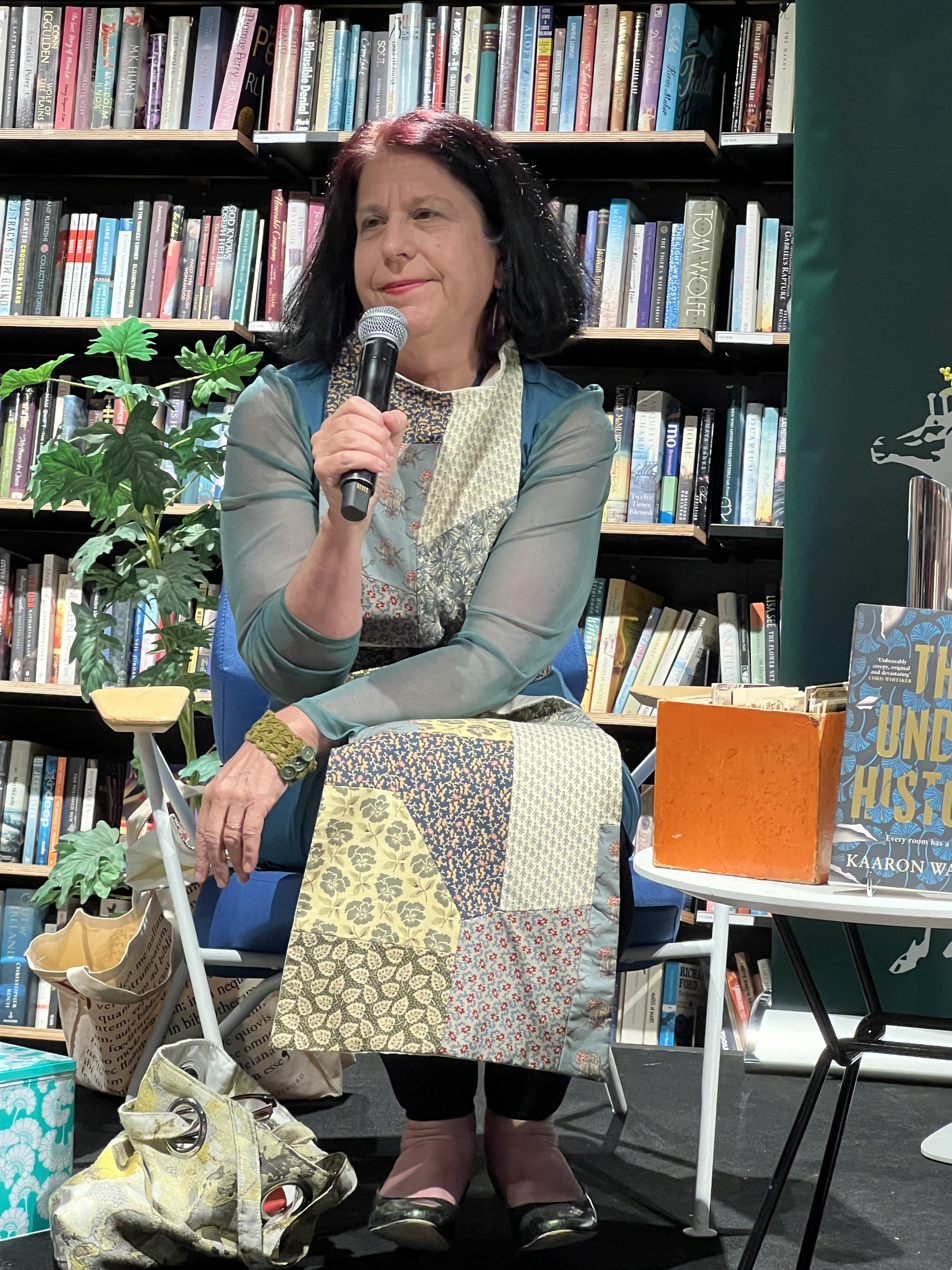
- In June 2024
- Occupation: Writer
- Writing career
- Genres: Speculative fiction Horror fiction

Kaaron Warren is an Australian author of horror, science fiction, and fantasy short stories and novels.

She is the author of the short story collections Through Splintered Walls, The Grinding House, and Dead Sea Fruit. Her short stories have won Australian Shadows Awards, Ditmar Awards and Aurealis Awards.

Her six novels are Slights, Walking the Tree, Mistification (published by Angry Robot), The Grief Hole, Tide of Stone, and The Underhistory.

Kaaron was Special Guest at the 2013 Australian National Science Fiction Convention.

== Bibliography ==
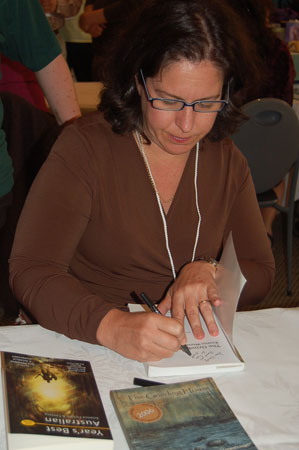
In 2007

=== Novels ===
- Slights (Angry Robot, July 2009 [UK, Australia]/September 2010 [US/rest of world]) ISBN 978-0-85766-007-7 (US)
- Walking the Tree (Angry Robot, February 2010 [UK/Australia]/January 2011 [US/rest of world]) ISBN 978-0-85766-043-5 (US)
- Mistification (Angry Robot, June 2011 [UK, Australia]/July 2011 [US/rest of world) ISBN 978-0-85766-108-1 (UK), ISBN 978-0-85766-109-8 (US)
- The Grief Hole (IFWG Publishing Australia, August 2016 [Worldwide-Hardcover August 2016] ISBN 978-1-925496-05-5, [Worldwide -Trade paperback August 2016] ISBN 978-1-925496-04-8)
- Tide of Stone (Omnium Gatherum Media, April 2018) ISBN 978-0615827995
- The Underhistory (Viper, April 2024) ISBN 9781800812024
- Going to Summertime (Meerkat Press, October 2026) ISBN 9781965740156

=== Contributed chapters ===
- In: Sherlock Holmes: the Australian casebook: all new Holmes stories (Victoria Echo, a division of Bonnier Publishing Australia, November 2017) ISBN 9781760404673
- In: Evil is a matter of perspective: an anthology of antagonists (Grimdark Magazine, April 2017) ISBN 9780648010562

=== Collections ===
- The Gate Theory (Cohesion Press, 2013)
- Through Splintered Walls (Twelfth Planet Press, 2012)
- The Grinding House (CSFG Publishing, 2005) ISBN 0-9581390-3-2
- Dead Sea Fruit (Ticonderoga Publications, 2010)

=== Short fiction ===
- "White Bed" (1993) in Shrieks
- "The Blue Stream" (1994) in Aurealis No. 14 (ed. Stephen Higgins, Dirk Strasser)
- "The Salamander" (1994) in Don't Cross the Water and Other Warnings
- "Summer Coming" (1994) in Narcissus Magazine No. 10
- "The Wrong Seat" (1994) in Calling Up the Devil and Associated Misdemeanours
- "The First Interview" (1995) in UQ Social Alternatives Magazine, Volume 14, No. 3
- "Loud Music" (1995) in Spies, Lies and Watching Eyes
- "The Paper Room" (1995) in Going Down Swinging No. 15
- "Skin Holes" (1995) in Strange Fruit (ed. Paul Collins)
- "The Hanging People" (1996) in Bloodsongs No. 7 (ed. Steve Proposch)
- "A Positive" (1998) in Bloodsongs No. 10
- "The Glass Woman" (1998) in Aurealis No. 22 (ed. Stephen Higgins, Dirk Strasser)
- "My Smile" (1999) in Nasty Snips (ed. Christopher C. Teague)
- "The School Fair" (1999) in Ghosts and Ghoulies (ed. Paul Collins, Meredith Costain)
- "The Left Behind" (2000) in Orb Speculative Fiction No. 1 (ed. Sarah Endacott)
- "The Speaker of Heaven" (2001) in Orb Speculative Fiction No. 2 (ed. Sarah Endacott)
- "Survival of the Last (2001) in Aurealis #27/28 (ed. Dirk Strasser, Stephen Higgins)
- "State of Oblivion" (2003) in Elsewhere (ed. Michael Barry)
- "Bone Dog" (2003) in Agog! Terrific Tales (ed. Cat Sparks)
- "Guarding the Mound" (2004) in Encounters (ed. Maxine McArthur, Donna Maree Hanson)
- "The Capture Diamonds" (2005), in Shadow Box
- "Doll Money" (2005) in Fables and Reflections, No. 7
- "Fresh Young Widow" (2005) in The Grinding House
- "The Grinding House" (2005) in The Grinding House
- "The Smell of Mice" (2005) in The Grinding House
- "Smoke" (2005) in The Grinding House
- "Smoko" (2005) in The Grinding House
- "The Sameness of Birthdays" (2005) in The Grinding House
- "Tiger Kill" (2005) in The Grinding House
- "Working for the God of the Love of Money " (2005) in The Grinding House
- "Al's Iso Bar" (2005) in The Grinding House
- "The Gibbet Bell" (2006) in Borderlands No. 7
- "The Softening" (2006) in Shadowed Realms No. 9
- "Woman Train" (2006) in The Outcast (ed. Nicole R. Murphy)
- "Dead Sea Fruit" (2006) in Fantasy magazine (ed. Sean Wallace)
- " Ghost Jail" (2007) in 2012 (ed. Alisa Krasnostein and Ben Payne)
- "Cooling the Crows" (2007) in In Bad Dreams, Volume One: Where Real Life Awaits (ed. Mark S. Deniz, Sharyn Lilley)
- "Coalescence" (2007) in Aurealis #37 (ed. Stephen Higgins, Stuart Mayne)
- "His Lipstick Minx" (2007) in The Workers' Paradise
- "Polish" (2007) in Andromeda Spaceways Inflight Magazine No. 28 (ed. Zara Baxter)
- "The Census-Taker's Tale" (2008) in Canterbury 2100 (ed. Dirk Flinthart)
- "Buster and Corky" (2008) in Scary Food (ed. Cat Sparks)
- "Down to the Silver Spirits" (2008) in Paper Cities: An Anthology of Urban Fantasy (ed. Ekaterina Sedia)
- "The Edge of a Thing" (2009) in The Edge of a Thing
- "Tontine Mary" (2009) in New Ceres Nights (ed. Alisa Krasnostein)
- "The Gaze Dogs of Nine Waterfall" (2009) in Exotic Gothic 3 (ed. Danel Olson)
- "The Tell" (2009) in Poe (ed. Ellen Datlow)
- "That Girl" (2010) in Haunted Legends (ed. Ellen Datlow, Nick Mamatas)
- "Hive of Glass" (2010) in Baggage (ed. Gillian Polack)
- "The New Rat in Town " (2010) in Worlds Next Door (ed. Tehani Wessely)
- "Purity " (2010) in Scenes from the Second Storey (ed. Mark Deniz)
- "Loss" (2010) in Sprawl (ed. Alisa Krasnostein)
- "Sins of the Ancestors" (2010) in Dead Sea Fruit (ed. Alisa Krasnostein)
- "The Coral Gatherer" (2010) in Dead Sea Fruit (ed. Russell Farr)
- "The List of Definite Endings" (2011) in Teeth (ed. Ellen Datlow and Terri Windling)
- "The Five Loves of Ishtar" (2011) in Ishtar (ed. Amanda Pillar and K. V Taylor)
- "All You Can Do Is Breathe" (2011) in Blood and Other Cravings (ed. Ellen Datlow)
- "Lucky Fingers" (2011) in Steampunk Cookbook (ed. Sharyn Lilley)
- "The Rude Little Girl" (2011) in Black Static Magazine Real Horror issue (ed. Christopher Fowler and Maura McHugh
- "The History Thief" (2012) in Visions Fading Fast (ed. Gary McMahon)
- "Blame the Neighbours" (2012) in Slices of Flesh (ed. Stan Swanson)
- "The River of Memory" (2012) in Robots vs Zombies (ed. Jeff Conner)
- "The Pickwick Syndrome" (2012) in Stories of the Smoke (ed. Jared Shurin and Anne C. Perry)
- "The Unwanted Women of Surrey" (2012) in Queen Victoria's Book of Spells (ed. Ellen Datlow)
- "Blood is Blood" (2013) in Twisted Histories (ed. Scott Harrison)
- "Eleanor Atkins is Dead and Her House is Boarded Up" (2014) in SQ Mag Edition 14 (ed. Sophie Yorkston)
- "Exurbia" (2021) in Out of the Ruins, edited by Preston Grassman, Titan Books ISBN 978-1789097399

=== Reprints in Year's Best Anthologies ===
- "The River of Memory" (2012) in Year's Best Australian Fantasy and Horror (Ticonderoga Publications, ed. Talie Helene)
- "All You Can Do Is Breathe" (2012) in Year's Best Horror and Fantasy (Prime Books, ed. Paula Guran)
- "All You Can Do Is Breathe" (2012) in Najlepsze horrory (Best Horror Stories) anthology (Poland) (ed. Bartlomiej Paszylk)
- "That Girl" (2011) in Year's Best Australian Fantasy and Horror anthology (Ticonderoga Publications, ed. Talie Helene)
- "The Census-Taker's Tale" (2010) in Year's Best Science Fiction and Fantasy anthology (Mirrordanse Books, ed. Bill Congreve and Michelle Marquardt)
- "Polish" (2010) in Best Horror anthology (ASIM, ed. Juliet Bathory and Mark Farrugia)
- "The Gaze Dogs of Nine Waterfall" (2010) in Year's Best Horror 2 anthology (NightShade Books, ed. Ellen Datlow)
- "Dead Sea Fruit" (2006) in Year's Best Horror and Fantasy 20 (Tor Books, ed. Ellen Datlow, Gavin Grant and Kelly Link)
- "Dead Sea Fruit" (2006) in Year's Best Science Fiction and Fantasy (Mirrordanse Books, ed. Bill Congreve and Michelle Marquardt)
- "Fresh Young Widow" (2006) in Year's Best Horror (Brimstone Press, ed. Angela Challis)
- "Fresh Young Widow" (2006) in Year's Best Science Fiction and Fantasy (Mirrordanse Books, ed. Bill Congreve and Michelle Marquardt)

== Awards ==
=== Wins ===
Year	Award name/type	Title	References
1999	Aurealis Award, Horror short story	A Positive	
2006	ACT Writing and Publishing Award, fiction	The Grinding House	
2006	Ditmar Award, Novella/novelette	The Grinding House	
2006	Ditmar Award, Short story	Fresh Young Widow	
2009	Australian Shadows Award, Best Novel	Slights	
2009	Canberra Critics Circle Fiction Award	Slights	
2010	Ditmar Award, Best Novel	Slights	
2011	ACT Writing and Publishing Awards, Fiction	Dead Sea Fruit	
2012	Ditmar Award, Best Collected Work	Through Splintered Walls	
2012	Canberra Critics Circle Fiction Award	Through Splintered Walls	
2012	Australian Shadows Award, Best Collected Work	Through Splintered Walls	
2012	Aurealis Award, Best Horror Story	Sky	
2012	Australian Shadows Award, Best Novella	Sky	
2013	Aurealis Awards for Excellence in Australian Speculative Fiction, Science Fiction Division, Best Short Story	Air, Water and the Grove: The Lowest Heaven, Focus 2013: Highlights of Australian Short Fiction, 2013	
2013	Australian Shadows Award, Paul Haines Shadow Award for Long Fiction	The Unwanted Women of Surrey: Queen Victoria's Book of Spells: An Anthology of Gaslamp Fantasy, 2013	
2013	Shirley Jackson Awards: Novella	Sky	
2013	Ditmar Award, Best Novella	Sky	
2013	ACT Writing and Publishing Awards, Non-fiction-Fiction	Through Splintered Walls	
2015	Australian Shadows Award, Short Fiction		
2016	Australian Shadows Award, Novel	The Grief Hole	
2016	Aurealis Awards for Excellence in Australian Speculative Fiction, Horror Division, Novel	The Grief Hole	
2017	Ditmar Award, Best Novel	The Grief Hole	
2021	Ditmar Award, Short Story	The Calenture	
2022	Ditmar Award, Short Story	The King in Yella	
2022	Ditmar Award, Collection	Tool Tales (with Ellen Datlow)	
2023	Ditmar Award, Best Novella or Novelette	Remnants and Bad Water	
2023	Ditmar Award, Best Novella or Novelette	The Smell of Waiting	
2023	Ditmar Award, Best Short Story	Everything so slow and quiet	
2024	Ditmar Award, Best Novella or Novelette	Bitters	
2025	Ditmar Award, Best Novel	The Underhistory	
2025	Ditmar Award, Best Collection	Calvaria Fell (with Cat Sparks)	

=== Nominations ===
Year	Award name/type	Title	References
1996	Aurealis Award, Horror short story	Skin Holes	
1996	Aurealis Award, Fantasy short story	The Blue Stream	
1997	Aurealis Award, Horror short story	The Hanging People	
1998	Aurealis Award, Horror short story	The Glass Woman	
2001	Aurealis Award, Fantasy short story	The Left Behind	
2002	Aurealis Award, Fantasy short story	The Speaker of Heaven	
2004	Aurealis Award, Science Fiction short story	State of Oblivion	
2006	Ditmar Award, Collected work	The Grinding House	
2006	Australian Shadows Award	The Grinding House	
2007	Aurealis Award, Horror short story	Woman Train	
2007	Aurealis Award, Horror short story	Dead Sea Fruit	
2008	Ditmar Award, Short story	His Lipstick Minx	
2009	Aurealis Award, Best Horror Short Story	The Gaze Dogs of Nine Waterfall	
2009	Australian Shadows Award, Best Short Story	The Gaze Dogs of Nine Waterfall	
2009	Aurealis Awards for Excellence in Australian Speculative Fiction, Best Horror Novel	Slights	
2010	Aurealis Awards for Excellence in Australian Speculative Fiction, Best Collection	Dead Sea Fruit	
2010	Ditmar Award, Best Short Story	Tontine Mary: New Ceres Nights, Dead Sea Fruit	
2010	Ditmar Award, Best Novel	Walking the Tree	
2010	Ned Kelly Awards for Crime Writing, Best First Novel	Slights	
2011	Aurealis Awards for Excellence in Australian Speculative Fiction, Anthology Division	Ishtar	
2011	Bram Stoker Award (Final Ballot), Superior Achievement in Short Fiction	All You Can Do Is Breathe	
2011	Ditmar Award, Best Horror Story	All You Can Do Is Breathe	
2012	Shirley Jackson Award, Best Novella	Sky	
2012	Australian Shadows Award, Best Short Story	Road	
2012	Australian Shadows Award, Best Short Story	Mountain	
2012	Australian Shadows Award, Best Short Story	Creek	
2012	Aurealis Awards for Excellence in Australian Speculative Fiction, Science Fiction Division, Best Short Story	Lighthouse Keeper’s Club	
2012	Aurealis Awards for Excellence in Australian Speculative Fiction, Best Collection	Through Splintered Walls	
2013	Aurealis Awards for Excellence in Australian Speculative Fiction, Horror Division, Best Short Story	The Human Moth: The Grimscribe's Puppets, 2013	
2014	Ditmar Awards, Best Short Story	Air, Water and the Grove: The Lowest Heaven, Focus 2013: Highlights of Australian Short Fiction, 2013	
2015	Australian Shadows Award, Edited Publication	Midnight Echo: The Magazine of the Australian Horror Writers Association, no. 11 April 2015	
2015	Aurealis Awards for Excellence in Australian Speculative Fiction, Science Fiction Division, Short Story	Witnessing: The Canary Press Story Magazine, no. 6 December 2015	
2015	World Fantasy Award, Best Short Fiction	Death's Door Cafe: Shadows and Tall Trees, Spring no. 6 Focus 2014: Highlights of Australian Short Fiction, Nightmare, no. 43, April 2014	
2016	Australian Shadows Award, Short Fiction	All Roll Over	
2016	Aurealis Awards for Excellence in Australian Speculative Fiction, Science Fiction Division, Short Story	68 Days Tomorrow's Cthulhu: Stories at the Dawn of Posthumanity	
2016	Aurealis Awards for Excellence in Australian Speculative Fiction, Horror Division, Short Story	68 Days Tomorrow's Cthulhu: Stories at the Dawn of Posthumanity	
2019	Ditmar Awards, Novel	Tide of Stone	
2020	Ditmar Awards, Short Story	into bones like oil	
2021	Australian Shadows Award, Collected Works	Tool Tales	
2021	Australian Shadows Award, Short Fiction	The Steering Wheel Club	
2021	Australian Shadows Award, Non-fiction	Capturing Ghosts on the Page	
2023	Ditmar Awards, Short Story	Songs We Sing at Sea are the Lies We Tell Ourselves	
2024	Ditmar Awards, Novella or Novelette	The Deathplace Set	
2024	Ditmar Awards, Collected Work	Vandal: Stories of Damage	
2025	Ditmar Awards, Novella or Novelette	The Emporium	
2025	Ditmar Awards, Short Story	Bright Hearts	
2026	Ditmar Awards, Short Story	Bitter Skin	
2026	Ditmar Awards, Fan Art	Brave New Wardrobe, Conflux 19 art show	
