= Less Than Human (novel) =

2004 novel by Maxine McArthur

- Less Than Human first edition cover.
- Author: Maxine McArthur
- Cover artist: Shasti O'Leary Soudant
- Language: English
- Genre: Science fiction
- Publisher: Warner Aspect
- Publication date: October 1, 2004
- Publication place: United States
- Media type: Print (Paperback)
- Pages: 400 (first edition)
- ISBN: 978-0-446-61342-2

Less Than Human is a 2004 science fiction novel by Maxine McArthur. It follows the story where a factory worker is killed by a robot in mysterious circumstances and a group of teenagers appear to have committed group suicide.

== Background ==
Less Than Human was first published in the United States on October 1, 2004, by Warner Aspect in paperback format. It won the 2004 Aurealis Award for best science fiction novel and was a short-listed nominee for the 2005 Ditmar Award for best novel, losing to Sean Williams' The Crooked Letter.
