= A Positive =

- Short story by Kaaron Warren
- Country: Australia
- Language: English
- Genre: Horror

Publication
- Published in: Bloodsongs #10
- Publication type: Periodical
- Publisher: Implosion Publishing
- Media type: Print (Magazine)
- Publication date: 1998

"A Positive" is a 1998 horror short story by Kaaron Warren.

== Background ==
"A Positive" was first published in Australia in 1998 in issue #10 of the horror magazine Bloodsongs. The issue was edited by Steve Proposch and David G. Barnett and published by Implosion Publishing and was the last issue of Bloodsongs to be published. In 2005 "A Positive" was republished in Kaaron Warren's collection, The Grinding House which was edited by Warren and published by CSFG Publishing. "A Positive" won the 1998 Aurealis Award for best horror short story beating works by Paul Brandon, Glyn Parry, Aaron Sterns, as well as her other work that was nominated, "The Glass Woman".
