= Bill Congreve =

Australian writer (born 1959)

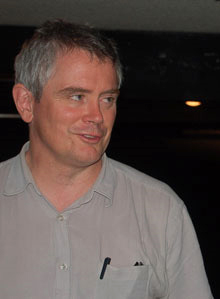
- Bill Congreve at the 2007 Aurealis Awards.
- Born: William David Congreve; 1959 (age 66–67)
- Partner: Michelle Marquadt
- Writing career
- Pen name: Jacci Olson
- Period: 1987–present
- Genre: Speculative fiction

Rob Hood

Bill Congreve is an Australian writer, editor and reviewer of speculative fiction. He has also published the work of Australian science fiction and horror writers under his MirrorDanse imprint.

== Biography ==
William (Bill) David Congreve was born in Nairobi, Kenya, in 1959. He moved to Australia in 1962 at the age of 3. He completed a BA in Communications from Macquarie University in 1985.. He then spent two years travelling North America, Britain and Africa. He has worked as a bar attendant, tree planter (52,000 in all), freelance journalist, public servant, mail sorter, bank clerk, and assistant manager of the SF store Infinitas Bookshop (Parramatta, Sydney).

His first stories were mainly published in university magazines. "Night Run" appeared in Union Recorder 60, No 6/7/8 (1980). This was followed by "Home Ground," which appeared in Don Boyd's SF magazine Futuristic No 5 (Feb 1982). Arena published his next three stories: "The Telephone" (in 16, No 4, Apr 1983), "Reservation" (in 17, No 4, Apr 1984) and "The Unproductive Murderer' (in 18, 1985).

Congreve's first professionally-published work was his short story "Collector" (Aphelion 5, 1987). He published further tales in the Australian small press in such fanzines as The Mentor and Esoteric Order of Dagon.

In 1992, Congreve's first edited anthology, Intimate Armageddons was released by Five Islands Press, featuring a short story and introduction by Congreve as well as 10 other horror stories by Australian authors. It was launched at Sydney's Galaxy Bookshop by Leigh Blackmore.

His tale "Red Ambrosia" appeared in Leigh Blackmore's anthology Terror Australis: The Best of Australian Horror in 1993 and was reprinted in the small-press anthology Deeds of Doom, ed. Anthony Markidis (Galley Press, 1994). Congreve's tale "I Am My Father's Daughter" was anthologised in Crosstown Traffic, ed. Stuart Coupe, Julie Ogden and Robert Hood, Five Islands Press, 1993.

In 1994, Congreve founded (with Rob Hood) his publishing company MirrorDanse Books, which specialised in science fiction and horror.

Throughout 1994-95, Congreve published further horror stories in professional magazines such as Aurealis ("Sit on My Grave and Tell Me That You Love Me", Aurealis 13, June 1994) and Bloodsongs ("Mind the Gap and "The Zombie Revolution" both in Bloodsongs 2, July 1994; "The Restaurant with No Name" Bloodsongs 3, (Dec 1994) and fanzines such as Cold Cuts ("The Corpse", Cold Cuts 1, 1995). His tale "Souls Along the Meridian" (under the pseudonym 'Jacci Olson') first appeared in the anthology Bonescribes: Year's Best Australian Horror, 1995, co-edited by Congreve and Rob Hood (MirrorDanse, 1996). "Fade to Black" appeared in Aurealis 17 (1996).

Congreve won his first award in 1996, winning the William Atheling Jr. Award for his essay "The Hunt for Australian Horror Fiction" which he co-authored with Sean McMullen and Steven Paulsen. At the 2007 Ditmar Awards Congreve won the Professional Achievement Award (for his work in MirrorDanse Books and the first two volumes of his anthology Year's Best Australian Science Fiction & Fantasy which he co-edited with his partner, novelist Michelle Marquardt); and the award for Best Collected Work for The Year's Best Australian Science Fiction & Fantasy: Volume Two.

In 1997, Congreve published his story "The Mullet That Screwed John West" as a standalone chapbook in an edition of 50 numbered copies, under the imprint of The Neanderthal Man Publishing Co (an imprint of MirrorDanse Books). A portion of this story had been published previously as "Interview" in Arena (16, No 8, 1984) and EOD (July 1991). Laid into some copies of this chapbook was a four-page leaflet titled "Triptych: Three Vampire Stories Hollywood Hasn't Done Yet," featuring the very brief tales "First Blood,""Me and Me" and "The Old Man and the Sea of Sand."

In 1998, he published Epiphanies of Blood: Tales of Desperation and Thirst, (MirrorDanse Books), a collection of six vampire stories, three previously unpublished. "The Mullet That Screwed John West" was reprinted here. The volume (which also included a bibliography of his short fiction to 1998) was edited by Robert Hood, with cover art by Kyla Lee Ward and back cover and interior artwork by Marianne Plumridge.

In 2007, Congreve published a revised version of the story "Turing Test" (from his 1998 collection Epiphanies of Blood) on the web at www.tabula-rasa.info/MirrorDanse/. The revised version was subsequently issued as a limited-edition (unnumbered) 24-page standalone chapbook under the title Until Sunrise (Chatswood NSW: The Neanderthal Man Publishing Co/ MirrorDanse Books).

Congreve and his family are based in Sydney. MirrorDanse Books has been inactive since 2009.

== Awards and nominations ==
Year	Award	Work	Category	Result
1996	Ditmar Award	The Hunt for Australian Horror Fiction (with Sean McMullen & Steven Paulsen)	William Atheling Jr. Award	Won
1997	Aurealis Award	"The Mullet That Screwed John West"	Best horror short story	Nomination
2003	Ditmar Award	–	William Atheling Jr. Award	Nomination
2003	Ditmar Award	Passing Strange	Best Australian collected work	Nomination
2004	Aurealis Award	"The Shooter at Heartrock Waterhole"	Best young adult short story	Nomination
2004	Bram Stoker Award	Southern Blood: New Australian Tales of the Supernatural	Best anthology	Nomination
2004	Ditmar Award	Southern Blood: New Australian Tales of the Supernatural	Best collected work	Nomination
2004	International Horror Guild Award	Southern Blood: New Australian Tales of the Supernatural	Best anthology	Nomination
2006	Ditmar Award	The Year's Best Australian Science Fiction & Fantasy: Volume One (with Michelle Marquardt)	Best collected work	Nomination
2007	Ditmar Award	–	Professional achievement	Won
2007	Ditmar Award	The Year's Best Australian Science Fiction & Fantasy: Volume Two (with Michelle Marquardt)	Best collected work	Won
2008	Aurealis Award	The Year's Best Australian Fantasy and Science Fiction: Fourth Annual Volume (with Michelle Marquardt)	Best anthology	Nomination

== Bibliography ==
=== Selected Short fiction ===
- "Collector" (1987) in Aphelion Science Fiction Magazine Summer 1986/1987 (ed. Peter McNamara)
- "Interview" (1991) in EOD No. 3 (ed. Chris A. Masters)
- "Dream" (1992) in Intimate Armageddons (ed. Bill Congreve)
- "The Milkman Comes" (1991) in EOD No. 5 (ed. Chris A. Masters)
- "In Search of Clean Air" (1992) in EOD No. 8 (ed. Chris A. Masters)
- "Totally Gratuitous Horror Story: Part 3: ...and then You Pay Taxes" (1992) in EOD #8 (ed. Chris A. Masters)
- "Red Ambrosia" (1993) in Terror Australis: Best Australian Horror (ed. Leigh Blackmore)
- "I Am My Father's Daughter" (1993) in Epiphanies of Blood: Tales of Desperation and Thirst (ed. Bill Congreve)
- "Sit on My Grave and Tell Me That You Love Me" (1994) in Aurealis No. 13 (ed. Stephen Higgins, Dirk Strasser)
- "Mind the Gap" (1994) in Bloodsongs No. 2 (ed. Chris A. Masters, Steve Proposch)
- "The Corpse" (1995) in Bonescribes: Year's Best Australian Horror: 1995 (ed. Bill Congreve, Robert Hood)
- "Souls Along the Meridian" (1995, as Jacci Olson) in Bonescribes: Year's Best Australian Horror: 1995 (ed. Bill Congreve, Robert Hood)
- "Fade to Black" (1996) in Aurealis #17, (ed. Stephen Higgins, Dirk Strasser)
- "The Mullet That Screwed John West" (1997) in Epiphanies of Blood: Tales of Desperation and Thirst (ed. Bill Congreve)
- "Boy" (1998) in Epiphanies of Blood: Tales of Desperation and Thirst (ed. Bill Congreve)
- "Turing Test" (1998) in Epiphanies of Blood: Tales of Desperation and Thirst (ed. Bill Congreve)
- "The Death of Heroes" (1998) in Epiphanies of Blood: Tales of Desperation and Thirst (ed. Bill Congreve)
- "The Desertion of Corporal Perkins" (2002) in Passing Strange (ed. Bill Congreve)
- "Legacy" (2003) in Southern Blood: New Australian Tales of the Supernatural (ed. Bill Congreve)
- "The Shooter at the Heartrock Waterhole" (2004) in The Faery Reel: Tales from the Twilight Realm (ed. Terri Windling, Ellen Datlow)
- "The Traps of Tumut" (2010) in Aurealis No. 43, (ed. Stuart Mayne)

=== Anthologies ===
- Intimate Armageddons (1992)
- Bonescribes: Year's Best Australian Horror: 1995 (1996) with Robert Hood
- Passing Strange (2002)
- Southern Blood: New Australian Tales of the Supernatural (2003)
- The Year's Best Australian Science Fiction & Fantasy: Volume One (2005, with Michelle Marquardt)
- The Year's Best Australian Science Fiction & Fantasy: Volume Two (2006, with Michelle Marquardt)
- The Year's Best Australian Science Fiction and Fantasy: Third Annual Volume (2007, with Michelle Marquardt)
- The Year's Best Australian Science Fiction and Fantasy: Fourth Annual Volume (2008, with Michelle Marquardt)

=== Collections ===
- Epiphanies of Blood: Tales of Desperation and Thirst (Parramatta, NSW: MirrorDanse Books, 1998)
- Souls Along the Meridian (Jamberoo, NSW: Blade Red Press, 2010). Foreword by Stephen Dedman.

=== Essays ===
- "The Rise of Australian Fantasy" (1993) in Aurealis #12 (ed. Stephen Higgins, Dirk Strasser)
- "Out of the Comfort Zone" (1994) in Bloodsongs #1 (ed. Chris A. Masters, Steve Proposch)
- "Out of the Comfort Zone" (1994) in Bloodsongs #2 (ed. Chris A. Masters, Steve Proposch)
- "Out of the Comfort Zone" (1994) in Bloodsongs #3 (ed. Chris A. Masters, Steve Proposch)
- "The Hunt for Australian Horror Fiction" (1995, with Sean McMullen and Steven Paulsen) in Bonescribes: Year's Best Australian Horror: 1995 (ed. Bill Congreve, Robert Hood)
- "Australian Horror: 1995" (1996, with Robert Hood) in Bonescribes: Year's Best Australian Horror: 1995 (ed. Bill Congreve, Robert Hood)
- "Intimate Armageddons: A History of a Book." The Australian SF Writers' News No 3 (Sept 1992), 26-30.
