= Pansing =

Singaporean company

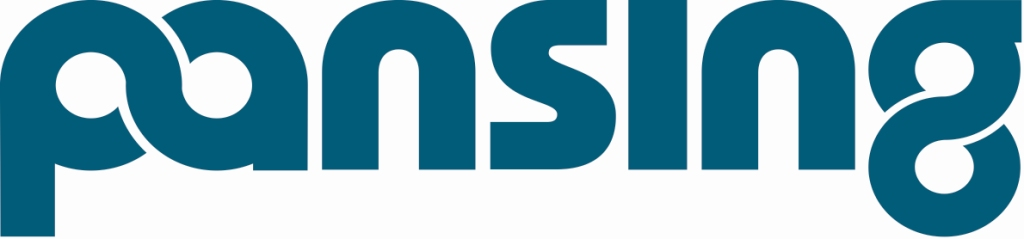
- Industry: Books and Magazine distribution
- Founded: 1975
- Headquarters: Singapore
- Products: Distribution,
- Owner: Times Publishing Limited
- Website: www.pansing.com

Pansing is a subsidiary company of Times Publishing Group, the printing and publishing subsidiary of Singapore-based conglomerate Fraser and Neave and at present is a distributor of books, magazines and related media in the Asia-Pacific region.
