= Zoran Živković (writer) =

Serbian writer and university professor

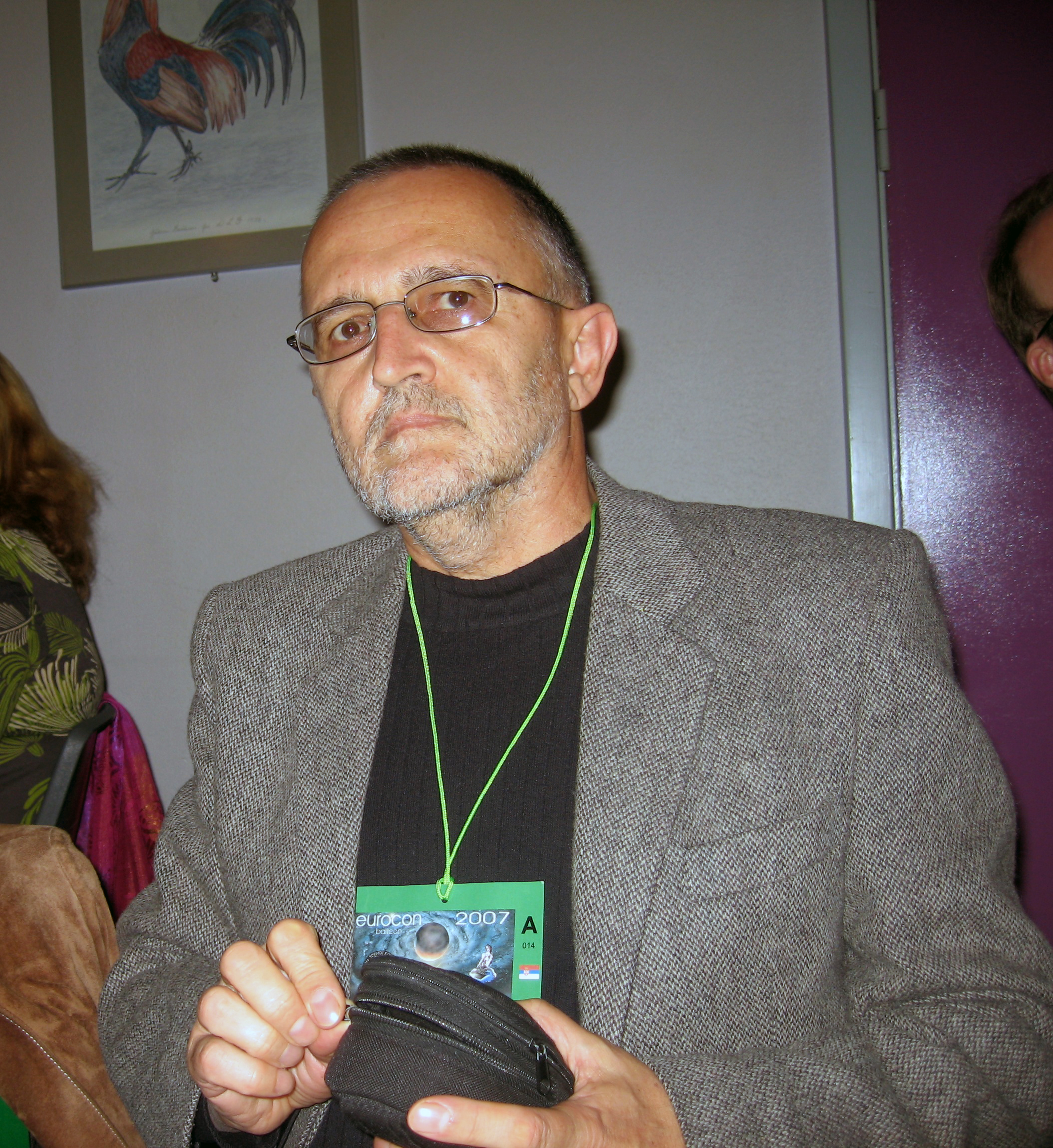
- Zoran Živković at Eurocon in Copenhagen, 2007
- Born: 5 October 1948 (age 77); Belgrade, Yugoslavia
- Education: University of Belgrade
- Occupation: Writer • University professor
- Writing career
- Language: Serbian
- Genres: Novel, Novella, Short story, Essay, Encyclopedia
- Notable works: The Library; Hidden Camera

Zoran Živković (Serbian Cyrillic: Зоран Живковић, pronounced [zɔ̌ran ʒǐːvkɔvitɕ], born October 5, 1948) is a Serbian writer, university professor, essayist, encyclopedist, publisher and translator. Živković's works have been translated into 20 languages. He was awarded the 2003 World Fantasy Award for his novella "The Library".

== Biography ==
In 1973, Zoran Živković graduated in literary theory from the Department of Comparative Literature in the Faculty of Philology at the University of Belgrade. He received his master's degree in 1979 with the work "Anthropomorphism and the motif of the first contact in the works of Arthur C. Clarke" ("Antropomorfizam i motiv prvog kontakta u delima Artura Klarka") and his doctorate in 1982 from the same university. His dissertation was "The Appearance of Science Fiction as a Genre of Artistic Prose" ("Nastanak naučne fantastike kao žanra umetničke proze").

From the mid-1970s to the early 1990s, Živković was widely involved with science fiction. Apart from his two theses, he was a publisher (founding the Polaris press, through which he released over two hundred books), a translator (translating more than 70 books, mostly from English), an essayist (four of Živković's books of essays appeared in this period), a researcher (producing a large, richly illustrated, two-volume Encyclopedia of Science Fiction) and a TV host (he wrote and hosted a television series about science fiction cinema, titled The Starry Screen).

From the mid-1990s onward, Živković discontinued his engagement in SF and turned entirely to writing non-genre fiction. In this capacity, he defines himself as "a writer without any prefixes – a humble practitioner of the ancient and noble art of prose." An early agent of his suggested Živković publish under the name "Donald Livingston," to make his work more marketable in the U.S., a suggestion which Živković rejected. Between 1993 and early 2016, he wrote 21 books of fiction which were published in 81 foreign editions, 20 languages and 23 countries.

Živković has won several literary awards for his fiction. In 1994, his novel The Fourth Circle won the "Miloš Crnjanski" award. In 2003, Živković's mosaic novel The Library won a "World Fantasy Award" for Best Novella. In 2007 his novel The Bridge won the "Isidora Sekulić" award. In 2007 Živković received the "Stefan Mitrov Ljubiša" award for his life achievement in literature. In 2014 and 2015 Živković received three awards for his contribution to the literature of fantastika: "Art-Anima", "Stanislav Lem" and "The Golden Dragon".

In 2005, Belgrade TV station Studio B produced The Collector (Sakupljač) TV series, based upon Živković's mosaic novel Twelve Collections. In 2007, notable Serbian film author Puriša Đorđević directed the film Two (Dva), based on Živković's fictional themes.

Two of Živković's stories were produced as radio broadcasts by the BBC: "The Train" (2005) and "Alarm Clock on the Night Table" (2007).

The prestigious US literary magazine World Literature Today brought a special section on Živković's writing in the November/December 2011 issue.

From 2007 to 2017, Živković was a professor in the Faculty of Philology at the University of Belgrade where he taught Creative Writing. He was initiator of the Workshop for Creative Writing (Radionica kreativnog pisanja „PričArt”) in 2011.

In 2019 his collected works have been published in English in the USA.

As of 2020, his works have been translated to 20 languages.

== Bibliography ==
=== Fiction ===
- The Fourth Circle (Četvrti krug, 1993.)
- Time Gifts (Vremenski darovi, 1997.)
- The Writer (Pisac, 1998.)
- The Book (Knjiga, 1999.)
- Impossible Encounters (Nemogući susreti, 2000.)
- Seven Touches of Music (Sedam dodira muzike, 2001.)
- The Library (Biblioteka, 2002.)
- Steps through the Mist (Koraci kroz maglu, 2003.)
- Hidden Camera (Skrivena kamera, 2003.)
- Compartments (Vagon, 2004.)
- Four Stories till the End (Četiri priče do kraja, 2004.)
- Twelve Collections and The Teashop (Dvanaest zbirki i Čajdžinica, 2005.)
- The Bridge (Most, 2006.)
- Miss Tamara, The Reader (Čitateljka, 2006.)
- Amarcord (Amarkord, 2007.)
- The Last Book (Poslednja knjiga, 2007.)
- Escher's Loops (Esherove petlje, 2008.)
- The Ghostwriter (Pisac u najam, 2009.)
- The Five Wonders of the Danube (Pet dunavskih čuda, 2011.)
- The Grand Manuscript (Nađi me, 2012.)
- The Compendium of the Dead (Zbornik mrtvih, 2015.)
- The Image Interpreter (Tumač fotografija, 2016.)
- The White Room (Bela soba, 2021.)
- Four Deaths and One Resurrection of Fyodor Mihailovič ("Četiri smrti i vaskrsenje Fjodora Mihailoviča", 2023.)
- The Black Room (Crna soba, 2026.)

=== Nonfiction ===
- Contemporaries of the Future (Savremenici budućnosti, 1983)
- The Starry Screen (Zvezdani ekran, 1984)
- First Contact (Prvi kontakt, 1985)
- The Encyclopedia of Science Fiction I-II (Enciklopedija naučne fantastike I-II, 1990)
- Essays on Science Fiction (Ogledi o naučnoj fantastici, 1995)
- On Genre and Writing (O žanru i pisanju, 2010)
- The Clay Writer: Shaping in Creative Writing (Pisac od gline — oblikovati u kreativnom pisanju, 2013)
- Challenges of Fantastika (2013)

=== Anthologies edited ===
- The Devil in Brisbane (2005)
- Fantastical Journeys to Brisbane (2007)

=== Critical editions ===
- Dostoyevsky's Demons (Zli dusi, Dostojevski, 2021)

== Awards ==
- Miloš Crnjanski Award
- World Fantasy Award
- Isidora Sekulić Award
- Stefan Mitrov Ljubiša Award
- Art-Anima Award
- Stanislav Lem Award
- Dublin Literary Award
