= Maxine McArthur =

Australian writer of science fiction (born 1962)

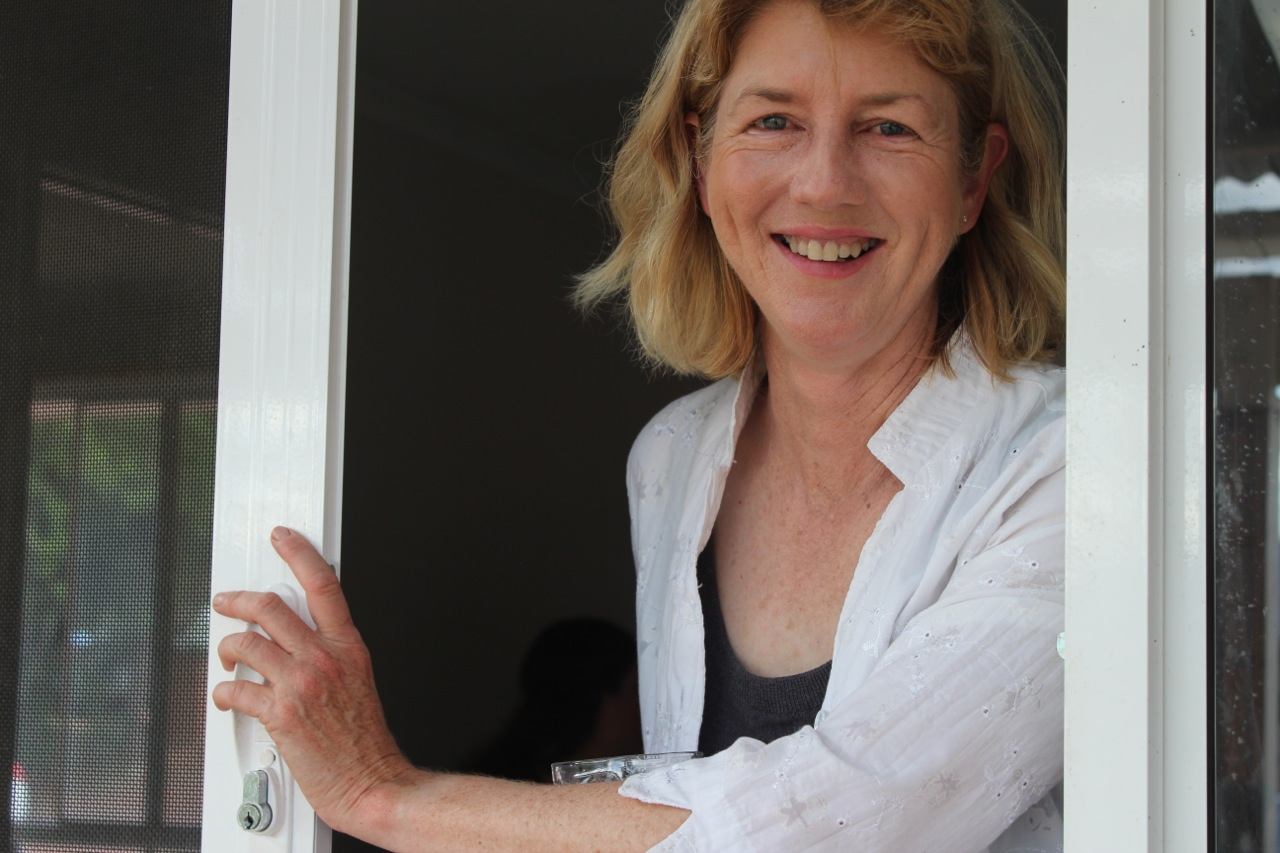
- Maxine McArthur in 2012.
- Born: 1962 (age 63–64)
- Writing career
- Genre: Science fiction
- Notable awards: Aurealis Award; Science fiction division 2004 Less Than Human
- Website: www.maxinemcarthur.com/Default.htm

Maxine McArthur is an Australian writer of science fiction.

== Biography ==
McArthur spent 16 years living in Japan but returned to live in Canberra in 1996. In 1999 McArthur's first book was released in Australia, entitled Time Future. It won the 1999 George Turner Award and finished ninth in 2000 Locus Awards for best first novel. In 2002 she released the sequel to her first novel entitled Time Past which was a short-list nominee for the 2003 Ditmar Award for best Australian novel. In 2004 her third novel Less Than Human won the 2004 Aurealis Award for best science fiction novel which also was a short-list nominee for the 2005 Ditmar Award for best novel. In the 2005 Ditmar Awards McArthur and co-editor Donna Hanson were short-list nominees for best collected work with their anthology Encounters.

== Bibliography ==
=== Novels ===
- Time Future (1999)
- Time Past (2002)
- Less Than Human (2004)

=== Short stories ===
- Playing Possum (2001) in Nor of Human... An Anthology of Fantastic Creatures (ed. Geoffrey Maloney)
- Remembering Bathys (2002) in Machinations: An Anthology of Ingenious Designs (ed. Chris Andrews)
- The Dragon Bell (2002) in Aurealis #30 (ed. Keith Stevenson)
- Sword of Liberation (2003) in Elsewhere: An Anthology of Incredible Places (ed. Michael Barry)
- Kappas (2004) in Andromeda Spaceways Inflight Magazine, Issue #13 (ed. Andrew Finch)
- Bakemono (2006) in The Outcast : An Anthology of Exiles and Strangers (ed. Nicole R. Murphy)
- Breaking the Ice (2007) in Daikaiju! 2 Revenge of the Giant Monsters (ed. Robin Pen, Robert Hood)

=== Anthologies ===
- Encounters: An Anthology of Australian Speculative Fiction (2004) (with Donna Hanson)

=== Non-fiction ===
- Historical Dictionary of Japanese Science and Technology (2002) (with Morris Low)
