= Celia Humphris =

English singer and voice artist (1950–2021)

Celia Drummond (née Humphris; 26 December 1950 – 11 January 2021) was an English singer and voice artist. She is best known as the lead singer of the folk rock band Trees, a position which she held throughout the band's active years.

== Early life and education ==
Humphris was born on 26 December 1950; her father was Frank Humphris, an illustrator for the Eagle comic series. She attended Arts Educational Schools in Chiswick, where she studied singing, dance and drama.

== Trees (1969–1972) ==
Humphris auditioned for Trees at the request of acoustic guitarist David Costa. The band did not yet have a lead vocalist, and Costa thought of Humphris, whom he knew as the sister of an acquaintance.

Humphris was the lead vocalist for both albums produced by the original group, The Garden of Jane Delawney (1970) and On the Shore (1971). She continued as lead vocalist for the band's second incarnation in 1972 after the original group dissolved.

== After Trees ==
After the breakup of Trees, Humphris continued as a singer. She co-hosted several radio music shows and became a regular voice on Capital Radio. She provided guest vocals for several songs on Judy Dyble's Talking With Strangers album in 2009, Dodson and Fogg, a folk-rock project released in 2012, and Galley Beggar's 2017 album Heathen Hymns.

Humphris was a highly sought-after voice artist, providing vocals for a wide variety of environments, including television adverts, radio drama, and cartoon characters. Her voice was widely used at railway stations across the British railway network, often being used alongside voice artist Phil Sayer. She also provided the voice of onboard announcements on London Underground Jubilee and Northern Line trains.

In Provence, France, where she lived in her later years, Humphris provided services as a wedding celebrant.

== Personal life ==
Humphris was married to BBC Radio 1 DJ Pete Drummond from August 1972 until their divorce in 1995.

For much of her later life, Humphris lived in Provence. She married Trent Ford, a former American fighter pilot, and had a Ragdoll cat (named Silkenrags) in Roquebrune sur Argens. She died on 11 January 2021, at the age of 70.
