= Trees (band) =

Folk rock band

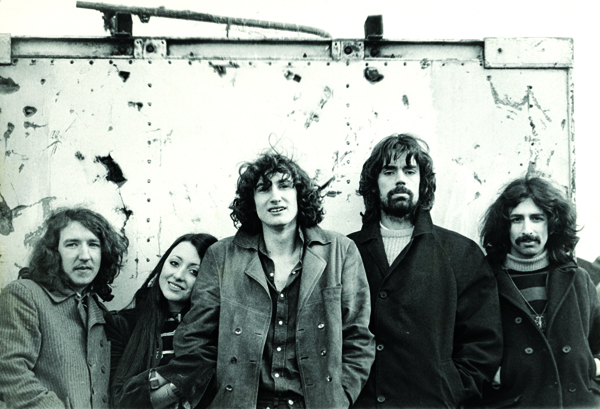
- Trees, circa 1970. Left to right: Bias Boshell, Celia Humphris, Barry Clarke, Unwin Brown, and David Costa

Background information
- Origin: London, England
- Genres: Folk rock; acid folk
- Years active: 1969-1972; 2008
- Labels: CBS, BGO, Sony BMG, Sunbeam, Habla
- Past members: Celia Humphris; Barry Clarke; David Costa; Bias Boshell; Unwin Brown; Barry Lyons; Alun Eden; Chuck Fleming

Trees was a British folk rock band recording and touring throughout 1969, 1970 and 1971, reforming briefly to continue performing throughout 1972. Although the group met with little commercial success in their time, the reputation of the band has grown over the years, and underwent a renaissance in 2007 following Gnarls Barkley's sampling of the track "Geordie" (from Trees' second album On the Shore) on the title track of their multi-million selling album St. Elsewhere.

== Formation ==
The original band comprised five members – bass and keyboard player Bias Boshell, lead guitarist Barry Clarke, acoustic guitarist David Costa, drummer Unwin Brown and singer Celia Humphris.

David Costa, son of British singer and radio presenter Sam Costa, was reading Fine Arts at the recently opened University of East Anglia when he met Barry Clarke (who had been working at Royd's advertising agency in London) through a mutual girlfriend who had suggested, as they were both guitar players, that they should connect. In David's words, following their first meeting—"I never went back to University, and Barry never went back to his office." Barry Clarke was living at the time in a house in Barnes, shared with Bias Boshell.

Bias Boshell and Unwin Brown had both attended Bedales School in Petersfield, Hampshire, and within a short time, all four were sharing their diverse musical experiences, exploring their different tastes and bringing together what they each enjoyed in common with each other. Lacking a singer, Costa suggested they audition the sister of an acquaintance of his and introduced Celia Humphris into the mix, who had just left Arts Educational where she had studied dance, drama, and singing. Humphris' father was the painter and illustrator Frank Humphris (e.g. for the Riders of the Range strip in the boys' comic The Eagle).

The five of them began rehearsing in the early spring of 1969, starting to do their first gigs and early demo tracks throughout June and July of the same year.

== Career ==
Signed to CBS in August 1969, Trees produced two studio albums in relatively quick succession, The Garden of Jane Delawney (released April 1970) and On the Shore (released January 1971), both recorded at Chelsea's Sound Techniques studios, and both produced by Tony Cox. On the Shore featured cover artwork by Storm Thorgerson of the Hipgnosis studio. Like other folk contemporaries, Trees was compared with Fairport Convention, but regarded as delivering with a more psychedelic edge. The group's material was divided between adaptations of traditional songs and original compositions, primarily by Bias Boshell. In a 2020 interview, Costa commented: "We got labelled as a folk-rock band, full stop, but our influences were generally far more American than British."

The original group disbanded in 1971 after recording the two albums. A second Trees incarnation formed in 1972 and played until 1973; this group featured Celia Humphris, Barry Clarke, Barry Lyons (ex-member of Mr. Fox), Alun Eden (also ex-member of Mr. Fox) and Chuck Fleming (ex-member of the JSD Band). Recordings by this line-up can be found on bootleg releases.

This latest formation also contributed to Phil Trainer's solo album Trainer (BASF, 1972)

=== Performance ===
Trees performed extensively throughout their career, predominantly on the university circuit but appearing twice at Fairfield Halls and at the Queen Elizabeth Hall on London's South Bank, with varying degrees of success and at times recognised with significant critical praise. Throughout their touring career they supported acts including Fotheringay, Fairport Convention, Matthew's Southern Comfort, Fleetwood Mac; Free and Faces on the same bill, Genesis, Family and Yes, and appeared at the Evolution Music Festival in Le Bourget, Paris in 1970 alongside Ginger Baker's Air Force, Pink Floyd and Procol Harum. A very early gig in London's Notting Hill had them appearing with a virtually unknown David Bowie. The band were often accompanied on the road and supported by singer-songwriter Marc Ellington. They were originally managed by Douglas Smith and Clearwater Productions, a Notting Hill Gate company who also managed contemporaries such as High Tide, Cochise and Skin Alley and went on to manage Hawkwind and Thunderclap Newman.

Trees achieved ongoing support from early in their performing and recording career by radio DJs John Peel and Bob Harris, for whom they were later to appear twice in his Sounds of the Seventies TV series, and also Pete Drummond, who was later to marry singer Celia Humphris.

== Post-Trees ==
Following the demise of the original lineup

- Barry Clarke went on to join the Vigrass and Osborne band, subsequently to rejoin David Costa in the 1973 band and eponymous album Casablanca (Rocket Records). He continued into the jewellery business, now living part-time in France.
- Bias Boshell went on to work as a keyboard player and songwriter with The Kiki Dee Band, writing her hit song "I've Got the Music in Me", before joining Barclay James Harvest and subsequently The Moody Blues, replacing keyboard player Patrick Moraz. He now lives in North Wales.
- David Costa went on to become art director and designer for many notable artists such as Elton John, George Harrison, Eric Clapton, the Rolling Stones and the Beatles.
  - Costa and Boshell performed together as the "reunion" On the Shore Band in 2018.
- Unwin Brown, after a brief spell as drummer with the pop foursome Capricorn, went on to enjoy a long career as a teacher, eventually at Thomas's School in Kensington until his death in 2008.
- Celia Humphris continued with Trees' second lineup. She provided guest vocals for several songs on Judy Dyble's Talking With Strangers album in 2009, Dodson and Fogg, a folk-rock project released in 2012, and as guest vocalist on Galley Beggar's 2017 album Heathen Hymns, released on Rise Above Records. Outside of music, she became a sought-after voice-over artist, providing voices for many different environments, notably train announcements on the British railway network. She later lived in Provence, France. She died on 11 January 2021.

== Personnel ==
- Celia Humphris – lead vocals (1969–1972; died 2021)
- Barry Clarke – lead guitar (1969–1972)
- David Costa – acoustic guitar, mandolin (1969–1971)
- Bias Boshell – bass guitar, guitar, vocals, piano (1969–1971)
- Unwin Brown – drums, vocals (1969–1971)
- Barry Lyons – bass guitar (1971–1972)
- Alun Eden – drums (1971–1972)
- Chuck Fleming – fiddle (1971–1972)

== Discography ==
Year	Album	Label
1970	The Garden of Jane Delawney	CBS Records, 2007 Sony Rewind, Sunbeam Records
1971	On the Shore	CBS Records, 2007 Sony Rewind, Sunbeam Records
1989	Trees LIVE! (Italian)	Habla (bootleg)
2020	Trees (50th Anniversary Edition)	Fire Records
2025	Fore And After	Earth Records

Both The Garden of Jane Delawney and On the Shore have been continuously available since their original release in either vinyl, cassette or CD formats. A deluxe two-disc edition of On the Shore was released in 2007, containing previously unreleased and remixed material. A new edition of The Garden of Jane Delawney followed in 2008, also containing previously unreleased material as well as some new recordings. Both double packages featured an extensive essay by comedian, director and writer Stewart Lee.

A four-album box set of Trees' recordings, including demos, remixes, plus live recordings from the Trees' 2018 "reunion" On the Shore Band, was released in 2020 to mark the band's fiftieth anniversary.
