= 4th English Album =

Studio album by Françoise Hardy
- Released: 1971 (South Africa)
- Studios: Sound Techniques, London England; Studio CBE, Paris; Studio Davout, Paris France
- Genre: Folk rock
- Length: 37:28
- Language: English
- Label: MvN
- Producer: Françoise Hardy

Françoise Hardy chronology
La question (1971)	4th English Album (1971)	Et si je m'en vais avant toi (1972)

Alternative covers
- French edition (1972)

Alternative cover
- French reissue (2000)

4th English Album is a studio album by the French singer Françoise Hardy released in South Africa in 1971. A French edition was released with no title in 1972. Since its French reissue in 2000 on CD, the album has a new cover and bears the title of its most commercially successful song: If You Listen (See section: "Other editions").

== First edition ==
- South Africa, December 1971: LP, 4th English Album, MvN (MVC 3520).

=== Background ===
- Arrangements and artistic direction: Tony Cox (A1 to A5 + B1 to B4), Hervé Roy (A6), Tommy Brown and Micky Jones (B5)
- Sound engineers: Victor (A1 to A5 + B1 to B4 + B6), Bernard Estardy (A6), René Ameline (B5)

=== Track listing ===
Side A
No.	Title	Lyrics	Music	Length
1.	"If You Listen"	Tommy Brown, Micky Jones	Tommy Brown, Micky Jones	3:34
2.	"Ocean" (original title: The Ocean)	Beverley Martyn	Beverley Martyn	3:50
3.	"Until It's Time for You to Go"	Buffy Sainte-Marie	Buffy Sainte-Marie	2:57
4.	"The Garden of Jane Delawnay"	Bias Boshell	Bias Boshell	3:34
5.	"Sometimes"	Miles Wootton	Allan Taylor	3:10
6.	"Let My Name Be Sorrow" (original title: Quand je te regarde vivre)	Martine Habib	Bernard Estardy	3:05
Total length:				20:17

Side B
No.	Title	Lyrics	Music	Length
1.	"Brûlure" (Sung in French language.)	Françoise Hardy	Françoise Hardy	2:52
2.	"Can’t Get The One I Want"	Beverley Martyn	Beverley Martyn	2:50
3.	"I Think It's Going to Rain Today"	Randy Newman	Randy Newman	2:41
4.	"Take My Hand for A While"	Buffy Sainte-Marie	Buffy Sainte-Marie	2:58
5.	"Bowm Bowm Bowm" (original title: Bown, Bown, Bown)	Tommy Brown, Micky Jones	Tommy Brown, Micky Jones	3:50
6.	"Till The Morning Comes"	Neil Young	Neil Young	1:32
Total length:				17:11

== Others editions ==
- Australia, 1972: LP, Let My Name Be Sorrow, éd. Kundalini/Interfusion (SITFL 934.290).
- New Zealand, 1972: LP, Let My Name Be Sorrow, éd. Kundalini/Interfusion (SITFL 934.290).
- France, September 1972: LP, Kundalini Editions (KUN 65057).
- Netherlands, 1972: LP, Kundalini/CBS (S 65057).
- Brazil, 1974: LP, Kundalini/Som Livre (404.7039).
- Japan, 1975: LP, Love Songs, Kundalini/Epic (ECPO 18).

== Reissues ==
- Japan, 1979 : LP, Love Songs, éd. Kundalini/Epic/Sony (25-3P-75).
- Japan, 1990: CD, Love Songs, éd. Kundalini/Epic/Sony (ESCA 5190).
- France, September 2000: CD (digipak), If You Listen, Virgin (7 24384 99452 5).
- Great Britain, April 2013: CD, Midnight Blues – Paris . London . 1968-72, Ace International (CDCHD 1358).
- Europe, June 2017: CD (digipak), If You Listen, Parlophone/Warner Music.
- Europe, June 2017: LP (black 180 g), If You Listen, Parlophone/Warner Music.
