= Disco 2 (TV series) =

British television music show

- Presented by: Tommy Vance, Pete Drummond, Richard Williams, Mike Raven
- Country of origin: United Kingdom

Production
- Executive producer: Rowan Ayers

Original release
- Network: BBC2
- Release: 10 January 1970 – 8 July 1971

Disco 2 (or Disco Two) is a BBC2 television music show that ran between January 1970 and July 1971. It was the successor to Colour Me Pop and the precursor of The Old Grey Whistle Test. The earliest programmes were billed as Line Up's Disco 2, the programme – like Colour Me Pop before it – originally being a spin-off of Late Night Line-Up.

The series was produced by Rowan Ayers (the father of musician Kevin Ayers) and directed by Granville Jenkins. The regular presenter of the first series was Tommy Vance, who was replaced for the second series by Pete Drummond; other presenters used occasionally included Mike Harding, Richard Williams and Mike Raven. The theme music was initially by Elton John. This was later replaced with the opening riff of Led Zeppelin's "Moby Dick". Programmes were initially broadcast on Saturday evenings, later occasionally moving to Friday evening and then Thursday evening.

Only a few performances from the show are known to survive.

== Appearances ==
=== First series ===
- 10 January 1970: Joe Cocker, Lou Christie, Elton John
- 17 January 1970: Procol Harum, Juicy Lucy, The Peddlers
- 24 January 1970: Chicken Shack
- 31 January 1970: Pentangle, Richie Havens
- 7 February 1970: Taste, Jimmy Ruffin
- 14 February 1970: Wild Angels
- 21 February 1970: The Strawbs, Judas Jump
- 28 February 1970: Blodwyn Pig
- 7 March 1970: The Tremeloes, Fleetwood Mac
- 14 March 1970: The Faces, Toe Fat
- 21 March 1970: Slade, The Keef Hartley Band
- 28 March 1970: Yes, The Move
- 4 April 1970: Fairport Convention, Hookfoot
- 11 April 1970: Honeybus
- 18 April 1970: Juicy Lucy
- 25 April 1970: Slade, Legend
- 2 May 1970: Pretty Things, Trader Horne
- 9 May 1970: Family, Groundhogs
- 16 May 1970: Buddy Knox, Daddy Longlegs
- 23 May 1970: Stone the Crows, Duster Bennett
- 30 May 1970: Fleetwood Mac, Quintessence
- 6 June 1970: Groundhogs
- 13 June 1970: Free, Bobby Darin
- 20 June 1970: Procol Harum, Affinity
- 27 June 1970: The Roy Young Band, Audience
- 4 July 1970: "Bob Dylan Special"
- 11 July 1970: Alan Bown, Justine, Steeleye Span
- 25 July 1970: Matthews Southern Comfort, Mighty Baby, Savoy Brown

=== Second series ===
- 12 September 1970: Humble Pie, Taste, Melanie
- 19 September 1970: Strawbs, Caravan, Kris Kristofferson
- 26 September 1970: Quiver, Turley Richards
- 3 October 1970: Eric Burdon, The Mark-Almond Band, Orange Bicycle
- 10 October 1970: Bridget St John, Mott The Hoople
- 17 October 1970: Love Affair, Rare Bird, U.F.O., Jimmy Campbell & Peter Campbell
- 24 October 1970: Stone The Crows
- 31 October 1970: Slade, The Move, Clarence Carter, Sweet Box
- 7 November 1970: Cat Stevens, Good News
- 14 November 1970: Duncan Browne, Dream Police, Genesis, Zoo
- 21 November 1970: Curved Air, Fleetwood Mac, Curtis Mayfield
- 27 November 1970: Trapeze, Lindisfarne, Jonathan Kelly, Satisfaction
- 5 December 1970: James Taylor, Wishbone Ash
- 12 December 1970: Golden Earring, High Broom, Which What, Ray Fenwick
- 19 December 1970: Elton John
- 2 January 1971: Compilation programme
- 9 January 1971: Bill Fay, Stephen Stills, Tear Gas, Van der Graaf Generator
- 16 January 1971: Juicy Lucy, Livingston Taylor
- 23 January 1971: The Roy Young Band, Bronco
- 30 January 1971: Yes, Rod Demmick, Herbie Armstrong
- 25 February 1971: Nico, Argent, Tom Gerricky
- 4 March 1971: Graham Bond, Trees
- 11 March 1971: Atomic Rooster, Fairweather, Leon Russell
- 18 March 1971: The Alan Bown, Patto
- 25 March 1971: Jade, Stray
- 1 April 1971 Leon Russell & Friends
- 8 April 1971: Stray, Quintessence, Yvonne Elliman
- 15 April 1971: Mott The Hoople, Seals and Crofts, Hookfoot
- 22 April 1971: The Faces
- 29 April 1971: Loudon Wainwright III, Cochise
- 6 May 1971: The Keef Hartley Band, Seals and Crofts
- 13 May 1971: Allan Taylor, Warhorse
- 20 May 1971: James Taylor, Livingston Taylor, Uriah Heep
- 27 May 1971: The Byrds
- 3 June 1971: Assagai, Arthur 'Big Boy' Crudup, blues documentary feature
- 10 June 1971: Gordon Lightfoot
- 17 June 1971: Loudon Wainwright III, Help Yourself, Ernie Graham
- 24 June 1971: Iain Matthews, Stefan Grossman
- 1 July 1971: Brewer and Shipley
- 8 July 1971: Heaven
