= Annie Nightingale =

British DJ and television broadcaster (1940–2024)

Annie Nightingale CBE
- BBC Radio 1 publicity photo
- Born: Anne Avril Nightingale; 1 April 1940; Osterley, Middlesex, England
- Died: 11 January 2024 (aged 83); London, England
- Years active: 1963–2023
- Spouses: Gordon Thomas (divorced) Binky Baker (divorced)
- Children: 2
- Presenting career
- Style: Disc jockey
- Website: Annie Nightingale presents...

Annie Avril Nightingale (1 April 1940 – 11 January 2024) was an English radio and television broadcaster. She was the first female presenter on BBC Radio 1 in 1970 and the first female presenter for BBC Television's The Old Grey Whistle Test, where she stayed for four years.

Nightingale specialised in championing new and underground music, and encouraged other women to become DJs and broadcasters. She was the longest-serving broadcaster in BBC Radio 1's history and held the Guinness World Record for the longest career as a female radio presenter.

== Early life and education ==
Anne Avril Nightingale was born in Osterley, Middlesex, England, on 1 April 1940, the daughter and only child of Celia and Basil Nightingale. Her father ran a family wallpaper business. She attended St Catherine's School, Twickenham beginning at age five, although her family was not Catholic. She became a fan of blues music as a teenager. She later attended Lady Eleanor Holles School, Hampton, Middlesex (by scholarship), and the School of Journalism at the Polytechnic of Central London (now the University of Westminster).

== Journalism and television career ==
Nightingale began her career as a journalist in Brighton, East Sussex. She spent a short time at the Brighton and Hove Gazette as a general reporter, and then moved to become the only woman in the newsroom at The Argus in Brighton. She wrote a pop music column called Spin With Me and worked as a general reporter, court reporter, feature writer, and diarist. The last capacity involved interviews with Sean Connery in his first James Bond role, and Peter Sellers on location. She later recalled facing little overt sexism at the paper, and that she was allowed to publish feminist pieces.

During the early to mid-1960s, Nightingale worked in television, both as a reporter for BBC's Southampton- and Bristol-based news programme South Today, and light entertainment and music programmes for the ITV network's regional station Southern TV (now ITV Meridian).

In the early 1960s, as a result of meeting Dusty Springfield and her manager Vicki Wickham, editor of the new ground-breaking pop TV show Ready Steady Go!, Nightingale was invited to host a new sister TV show. She joined Associated-Rediffusion TV and hosted her own show in the 1960s, That's For Me. Nightingale presented the pop culture show, booked guest musicians who had not previously been seen on television such as the Yardbirds, and introduced the Who's first promotion film. At this time, she also hosted other specials for Associated-Rediffusion, including The Glad Rag Ball at Wembley, starring the Rolling Stones, and the British Song Festival in Brighton. She also covered the Sanremo Music Festival in Italy. Nightingale made numerous appearances on Ready Steady Go! and was a guest on their New Year's Eve Specials, which included some of the biggest pop, soul and rock stars of the era.

The following year, Nightingale co-hosted the music series Sing A Song Of Sixpence with host Ronan O'Casey. Later she appeared in the BBC TV series A Whole Scene Going, and made appearances on Juke Box Jury with such artists as Marianne Faithfull.

In the mid-1960s, inspired by her friend Pauline Boty, a pop art painter, she launched a chain of fashion boutiques, as a 'front person' and publicist. This swiftly became a chain called Snob. Nightingale put on fashion shows and took part in them, notably a charity show for Bernard Fitzalan-Howard, 16th Duke of Norfolk, at Arundel Castle, West Sussex. She also became a well-known fashion model, with sessions with photographers including Philip Townsend and Dezo Hoffmann. At this time Nightingale wrote regular columns and was both featured in and a feature-writer for leading youth magazines such as Town, Fabulous, Honey 19, and Petticoat. She specialised in writing about teen issues, burgeoning feminist perspectives and social issues. Nightingale also wrote for the music magazine Disc and Music Echo. Nightingale was the pop music columnist and feature writer for Cosmopolitan when it launched in the UK in 1970. Later and until the mid-1980s, she wrote regularly for the Sunday Mirror, and penned music columns for the Daily Sketch and the Daily Express.

Early in the 1970s, Nightingale hosted a documentary film series for BBC One, Before The Event. The series was filmed across the UK in locations such as The Lake District and Derbyshire. The series recorded the build-up to major events in the British sporting calendar, such as the Hennessy Gold Cup steeplechase and the Formula 1 British Grand Prix motor race at Silverstone. A little later, she appeared in her first feature film, Home Before Midnight, starring James Aubrey and Chris Jagger. Nightingale played a talk show TV host and was billed as playing the part of herself.

Nightingale worked with BBC TV on The Old Grey Whistle Test for four years. In 1978, she became the show's main presenter, as a replacement for long-time host Bob Harris. During her tenure, the show moved away from its traditional bias under Harris towards country music, blues rock and progressive rock and embraced popular modern styles such as punk rock and new wave. She left the series in 1982. During her tenure on the show, Nightingale introduced and championed artists including The Ramones, The Adverts, Talking Heads, Siouxsie and the Banshees, Ian Dury and The Blockheads, Public Image Ltd, Gang of Four, Linton Kwesi Johnson, The Au Pairs, Patti Smith, Iggy Pop, Blondie, Robert Fripp, John Cooper Clarke, U2, The Clash, Wreckless Eric, Nina Hagen, Elvis Costello and The Attractions, X-Ray Spex, Spandau Ballet, Duran Duran, Adam and The Ants, The Teardrop Explodes, The Damned, Madness, The Specials, The Selecter, The Undertones. Nightingale interviewed artists for the show, including Mick Jagger, Mick Taylor, Jeff Beck, Frank Zappa, Dusty Springfield and Paul Simon.

In December 1980 Nightingale presented a special edition immediately after the murder of John Lennon (who had appeared on the show in 1975). This particular episode consisted almost entirely of interviews with various people about Lennon's life and career.

She worked further with the BBC team, presenting long-running shows such as Late Night In Concert in addition to her weekly The Old Grey Whistle Test slot and Christmas specials.

In 1980, Nightingale accompanied The Police on their first world tour, which included places that had seldom hosted foreign performers—including Mexico, India, Taiwan, Hong Kong, Greece and Egypt, with the tour filmed for a documentary.

For Live Aid in 1985, Nightingale was commissioned by the Live Aid team to be the BBC's sole presenter at the Philadelphia US special. She commentated and presented, introducing artists including Duran Duran, Madonna, the Pretenders, Eric Clapton, Led Zeppelin, and Crosby Stills and Nash.

Between 1989 and 1990, Nightingale hosted an interview TV series for ITV entitled One To One. She conducted in-depth interviews with Debbie Harry, Paul McCartney, Cliff Richard, Stevie Nicks, Peter Gabriel, Robert Palmer, John Taylor of Duran Duran, Mike Oldfield and Status Quo.

In her later years, Nightingale wrote for The Guardian, The Times, Daily Telegraph, and The Spectator.

== Radio career ==
=== Presenter and writer ===
==== 1963–1969 ====
Nightingale's first broadcast on the BBC was on 14 September 1963 as a panellist on Juke Box Jury, and she contributed to Woman's Hour from January 1964 and hosted programmes such as Melody Fare on the BBC Light Programme in 1966.

She briefly worked at Radio Luxembourg in the 1960s.

Nightingale, at the time a pop music columnist, was inspired by pop pirate ships, broadcasting into Great Britain from international waters, to want to become a disc jockey. The pirate ships were outlawed by the UK government and shut down. Prime Minister Harold Wilson decreed that the BBC would run a new pop music station on land from London to replace them. This became BBC Radio 1, and was launched in September 1967. It was decreed by the production teams launching Radio 1 (many of whom were male ex-RAF staff), that there would be no women on air. Nightingale applied for a job as a Radio 1 DJ but was firmly rejected on the grounds of being a woman. Radio 1 decreed that its all-male DJ team were 'husband substitutes', and that a woman among them would alienate what they perceived to be a mostly female audience. Nightingale persisted for three years, and was only given a chance to audition by her friends The Beatles and their staff at Apple Records.

==== 1970–1981 ====
Nightingale was given a trial run of six programmes before she was signed as the first female DJ on Radio 1. Her early shows were stressful, as she was not taught how to use the station's technology and her male coworkers were unfriendly. However, she did form a friendship with John Peel. Nightingale started at BBC Radio 1 on 8 February 1970 with a Sunday evening show. However, after a trial run on Sunday nights, her first shows were daytime afternoon slots, handed over from Terry Wogan. In April 1970 she became one of the hosts of the singles review show What's New before graduating to a late-night progressive rock show, Sounds of the 70s, with Alan Black, John Peel, Bob Harris, Pete Drummond, and Mike Harding which was simulcast on the BBC Radio 2's FM frequency. Nightingale remained the only female DJ at Radio 1 for 12 years, from 1970 until 1982 when she was joined by Janice Long. By then, Nightingale was granted her request to broadcast her show in the evenings, which gave her more scope to play emerging underground and experimental music.

Nightingale hosted a Sunday afternoon request show on Radio 1 from September 1975 till 1979. The show was one of the first on British radio to regularly play music from CDs, taking advantage of its FM carriage before BBC Radio 1 had its own higher-quality frequencies.

From 1979 till 1982, Nightingale hosted a breakthrough Radio 1 Friday night music chat show, featuring live studio guests including Clive James, Rowan Atkinson, Michael Palin, Sting, Duran Duran and the Who.

==== 1982–1999 ====
Nightingale's Sunday afternoon request show was revived in 1982, which was broadcast at 7 pm on Sundays, immediately following the Top 40 show. It aired from 1982 to 1994. She opened the show by playing the intro of the show's first song before saying "Hi" in the last second before the vocals started. Nightingale credited Bernie Andrews, the producer for the team, for his success with this show, and later Pete Ritzema. When Nightingale was away, guest star 'deps' including Annie Lennox and Paula Yates were brought in to present and feature on the show.

During this period, Nightingale presented another Radio 1 show, a current affairs Wednesday evening show called Mailbag, which concentrated on politics and issues for young people. Nightingale's live studio guests included the government minister for Nuclear Procurement, and the budding comedians Dawn French and Jennifer Saunders. At one stage, Mailbag was produced by Juliet Blake. Nightingale also hosted a live Friday night slot, produced by another Radio 1 producer, Jeff Griffin.

In the late 1980s, Nightingale considered leaving radio after becoming disillusioned with popular music. However, she became interested and involved with acid house music from 1989 onwards, playing it on her Radio 1 show, before it became mainstream. This electronic and dance music involved the production and release of extended tracks and 12-inch singles that broke away from the traditional three-minute pop song. It suited this style of music to be played later in the evening, and so Nightingale went on to present a later slot on Radio 1 on Sunday nights, and then late-night party slots on Friday and Saturday nights.

Between 1989 and 1991, in addition to continuing her Radio 1 show, Nightingale hosted a Sunday lunchtime show featuring live phone-ins for Greater London Radio. Live guests included Ronnie Wood of the Rolling Stones, comedian Jack Dee and actor Dirk Bogarde. She also took on the GLR mid-morning daily show.

In 1994, Nightingale moved to a weekend overnight dance music show, initially called The Chill Out Zone, which she was still presenting at the time of her death in 2024.

As a DJ, Nightingale travelled and performed all over the world from Ibiza to Paris, New York City, Los Angeles, Austin, Barcelona, Warsaw and at major European festivals such as Sziget in Budapest, Roskilde in Denmark as well as at all the major British festivals such as Glastonbury, Bestival, Wickerman, Rockness, Lovebox, Kendal Calling and numerous others. She also broadcast TV and Radio documentaries during visits to Russia, Romania, Iraq, Chile, Philippines, United States, France, Ibiza, Japan, China, India and Cuba. At the same time she was a regular contributor to BBC Radio 4 news programmes such as The Today Programme, The World At One and The World This Weekend. While in Havana in 1996, she was injured during a mugging, resulting in multiple injuries requiring an air-lift to a London hospital, after which she wore the distinctive shades that became part of her image.

==== 2000–2009 ====
From the mid-2000s she hosted a breaks show, often featuring major breaks DJs such as Plump DJs, Freestylers, Noisia and Meat Katie. Nightingale regularly DJed live at clubs and festivals around the UK and Europe.

On 30 September 2007, the 40th anniversary of BBC Radio 1 was celebrated, Nightingale co-hosted a special return of the Request Show with Annie Mac featuring contributions from musicians such as Paul McCartney and Chemical Ed, excerpts from the original show and Nightingale's recollections of regular contributors such as "Night Owl of Croydon". The show featured many classic tracks which had been requested over the years and closed with one of Nightingale's favourites, Cristina's version of "Is That All There Is?".

A version of The Smiths song "Panic" interpreted by Mancunian cult comedian Frank Sidebottom dedicates its choruses to "Anne the DJ" (in place of the original song's "Hang the DJ") and asks "Anne Nightingale what's your blinking game; I waited for your roadshow, but your roadshow never came". In 2014, she appeared in The Life of Rock with Brian Pern as herself.

==== 2010–2019 ====
In 2013, Nightingale was featured in the BBC Radio 4 programme Getting on Air: the Female Pioneers, presented by Jane Garvey.

In 2015, it was revealed that Nightingale had been approached by the BBC to sign a letter warning Prime Minister David Cameron that his plans to reform the corporation would damage it. Nightingale, one of the letter's 29 signatories, revealed later on that she had not read the letter prior to signing it.

In 2015, Nightingale was commissioned by Paul McCartney to write the accompanying fully illustrated book as part of the deluxe re-release of his classic albums Tug of War and Pipes of Peace. In the same year, she appeared at ITV's gala spectacular The Nation's Favourite Beatles Number One.

==== 2020–2023 ====
In July 2020, Nightingale appeared as a guest on the long-running BBC Radio 4 show Desert Island Discs, choosing a saxophone as her luxury item and "Space Oddity" as the one track she would save if marooned on a tropical island.

In 2021, Nightingale's regular weekly Radio 1 show, then in its 52nd year was moved to an earlier slot, 11 pm on Tuesdays. In November 2021, Nightingale launched the Radio 1 scholarships. Nightingale discovered female and non-binary DJs, three who were given a special one-off slot on a Saturday night. The DJs were Martha from London, LCY from Bristol, and Godlands from Australia.

Her final appearance on BBC Radio 1 was in December 2023, when she presented a "Best of 2023" show.

=== BBC Radio 2 ===
In April 2012, Nightingale presented a show on BBC Radio 2 called Annie Nightingale's Eternal Jukebox. She continued presenting this on an occasional basis, usually on bank holidays. The Eternal Jukebox showcases "enjoyably unexpected musical pairings." Listeners were invited to suggest a song, and Annie paired it up with another song, often of a different genre, and suggested a link between the two songs. On 25 June 2012, she also presented a documentary for Radio 2 called Is It Worth It?, about the Falklands War in 1982. It was described on the Radio 2 website as "30 years on from the Falklands conflict, Annie Nightingale considers the impact of the war through the song Shipbuilding."

Nightingale returned to Radio 2 on 1 January 2014 for another one-off show entitled Annie Nightingale: Whatever Next?, broadcast between 8pm and 10pm. The show featured a variety of genres from the seven decades from the 1950s onwards.

=== 50th Anniversary at Radio 1 and Radio 2 ===
In 2020, Nightingale celebrated her 50th anniversary in broadcasting with a series of BBC specials, and a compilation album on Ministry of Sound. This features tracks by the Rolling Stones and Paul McCartney.

Nightingale's 50th anniversary at Radio 1 was marked by two documentaries on BBC TV and the release of her new memoir on 3 September 2020, published by White Rabbit Books, an imprint of Weidenfeld & Nicolson. The book looks at pop culture and social history over five decades, covering never-before-seen interviews with artists ranging from the Beatles to Billie Eilish, and includes Bob Marley, Marc Bolan, Primal Scream, the Streets, Dusty Springfield, Keith Moon, Elvis Costello, Little Simz and more. The memoir covers Nightingales's 50 years at BBC Radio 1 and book contains recollections of Paris in the 1950s, early raves in London, the Falklands War and the 1992 Los Angeles riots. She was the station's first female DJ, and also the longest-serving broadcaster on the station of any gender. She also held the Guinness World Record for the longest career as a female radio presenter.

== Personal life and death ==
Nightingale was married twice. At age 19, she eloped to Brighton with writer Gordon Thomas, with whom she had two children. They divorced in 1968. In 1978, she married actor Anthony Baker, who later appeared in Gangster No. 1 (2000), whom she also later divorced.

Nightingale died on 11 January 2024, aged 83, following a short illness.

== Publications ==
Nightingale published two autobiographical books: Chase The Fade (1981) ISBN 0-7137-1167-1 and Wicked Speed (1999) ISBN 0-283-06197-9. Chase the Fade was a vividly illustrated art book, illustrated with images from Nightingale's photo archive, as well as images from her collection of pop memorabilia. The text featured descriptions of The 1970 Isle of Wight Festival, the Who, and her experience touring with the BBC TV documentary, Police In The East.

She compiled three albums: Annie on One (1996, Heavenly Recordings), in which she included the then unsigned and undiscovered Daft Punk, her own instalment of the Breaks DJ mix series Y4K (2007, Distinctive Records), and 'Masterpiece' on the Ministry of Sound compilation series of that name (July 2015).

=== Hey Hi Hello ===
Nightingale's 2020 memoir, entitled Hey Hi Hello, celebrates five decades of pop culture and Nightingale's 50th anniversary as the first female DJ/presenter on radio was published by White Rabbit in 2020. It became an Amazon bestseller, was named a Rough Trade Book Of The Year in 2020 and was nominated for the Penderyn Music book prize.

Hey Hi Hello received glowing reviews, including praise from Trainspotting's author Irvine Welsh. The book's publication was celebrated with a BBC Radio 2's Christmas Special hosted by Zoe Ball.

The hardback published in September 2020 was soon followed by the paperback publication in 2021. Nightingale recorded an audiobook version to coincide with the hardback publication.

The publication of Hey Hi Hello coincided with the celebrations of her 50th anniversary, including an Annie Nightingale Night on BBC 4. This consisted of two back-to-back documentaries focussing on the punk and new wave eras that Nightingale championed during her five-year residency as anchor of The Old Grey Whistle Test. Nightingale was the first woman to host a rock music TV show singlehandedly. Following the documentary was a showing of the BBC TV film, Bird On The Wireless, directed by Simon Brook, acclaimed film director and son of theatre director Peter Brook and international movie star Natasha Parry. This was followed by a screening of Police In The East, the groundbreaking TV documentary directed by Derek Burbidge. This featured Nightingale narrating, commentating on and interviewing the new wave rock/pop group the Police as they were emerging as the best-selling group in the world. This film was shot in Japan, Hong Kong, India, Egypt and Greece, and gave Nightingale a lifelong desire for long-distance travel and documentary-making exploration adventures.

== Recognition and honours ==
In 2001, Muzik named Nightingale "Caner of the Year" for her appearances as a DJ in Ibiza.

In 2002 Nightingale was appointed a Member of the Order of the British Empire for her services to radio broadcasting. In 2004 she was the first female DJ from Radio 1 to be inducted into the Radio Academy Hall of Fame. In both 2006 and 2007 she won The International Breakspoll Award for Best Radio Show.

On 20 May 2011, Nightingale was featured in the BBC Four documentary Annie Nightingale: Bird on the Wireless, documenting her life and passion for music. The film has been shown three times on BBC Four and features tributes from Paul Weller and Tinie Tempah and interviews with Paul McCartney, Mani from The Stone Roses and Primal Scream, DJ Starscream and The Clash's Mick Jones. Also in 2011, Nightingale won the Best Special Radio Award for the sixth year running at the International Breakbeat Awards, and the BBC A&M award for the mammoth A Night With Annie Nightingale on BBC Radio 1, and the BBC launched its new BBC Archive Centre and named one of its vaults after Annie Nightingale, where she is in the company of Michael Palin and Sir David Frost.

Nightingale was made an honorary Doctor of Letters at the University of Westminster in December 2012. She was an ambassador at Prince Charles' The Prince's Trust and a patron of Sound Women, an organisation to promote women in broadcasting.

Already Member of the Order of the British Empire (MBE), Nightingale was also appointed Commander of the Order of the British Empire (CBE) in the 2020 New Year Honours for services to radio broadcasting. She is the only BBC Radio 1 broadcaster ever to receive this honour. In 2020, Nightingale was nominated for an Aria Award. She was awarded a lifetime achievement award by the Audio Production Awards.

In 2022, Nightingale was included in 100 Voices that represented significant BBC figures to celebrate the corporation's centenary. An extended video interview conducted and produced by the University of Sussex History department has now been lodged within its archive.
