= Jackie McAuley =

Musical artist (born 1946)

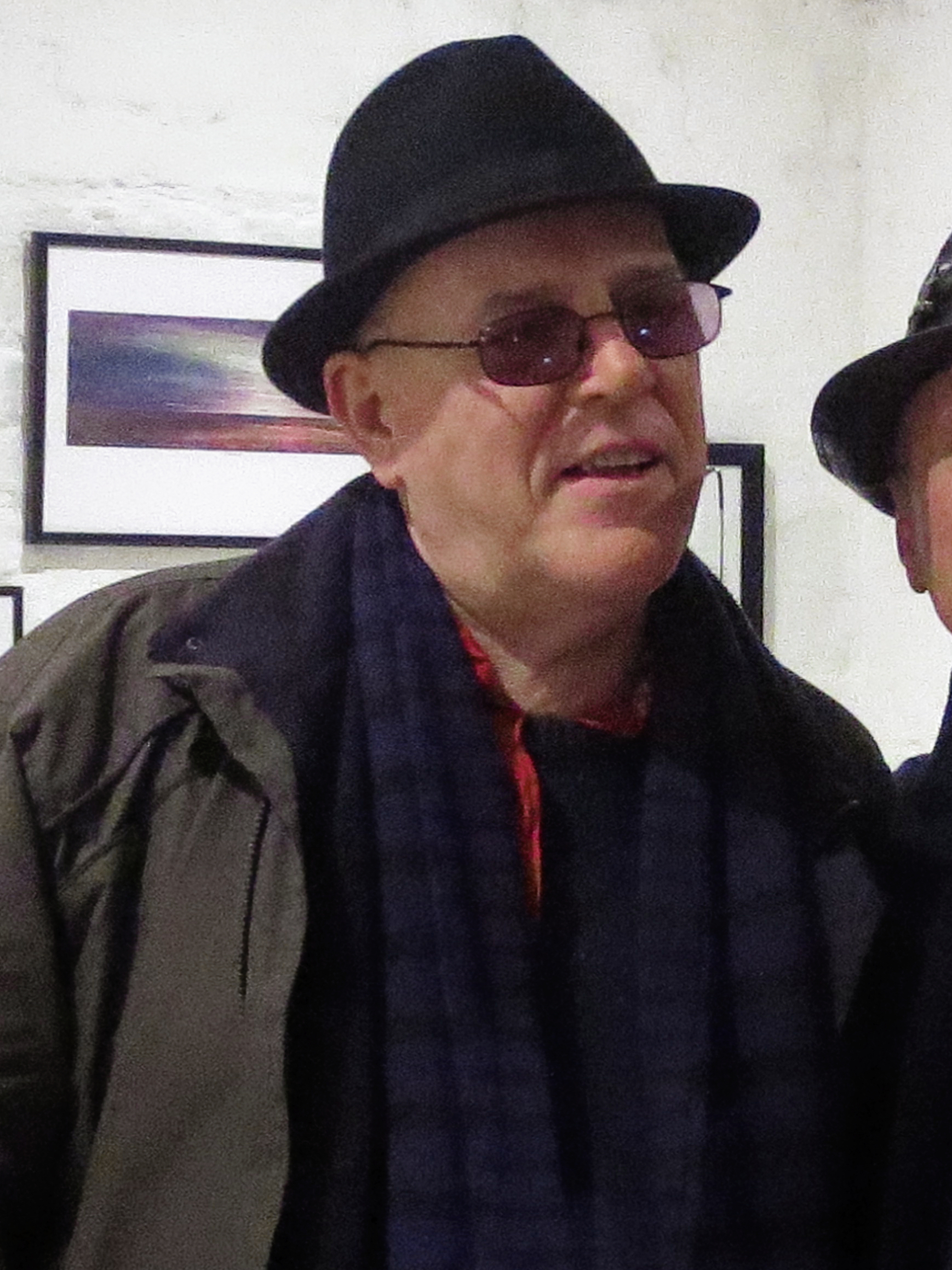
- McAuley in 2015

Background information
- Born: John James McAuley; 14 December 1946 (age 79); Derry, Northern Ireland
- Occupations: Musician, songwriter, record producer, author
- Instruments: Guitar, keyboards, mandolin
- Years active: 1960 – present

Jackie McAuley (born 14 December 1946) is a Northern Irish guitarist and keyboard player, known particularly for his work with the bands Them and Trader Horne.

== Career ==
As a member of Them (on keyboards) he recorded and toured with Van Morrison behind hit records "Baby, Please Don't Go", "Gloria" and "Here Comes the Night"; sharing stages with The Beatles, The Rolling Stones, The Who and The Kinks. Later when Van Morrison went solo, McAuley joined Paul Brady in Dublin band, The Kult. Moving back to London he formed his own Them, recording one album Belfast Gypsies for the Swedish Sonet label, which was partly produced by Kim Fowley. The album is hailed as one of the rawest and most powerful to emerge during the 1960s R&B boom.

McAuleys psych-folk duo Trader Horne, with ex Fairport Convention singer Judy Dyble also only released one album Morning Way in 1970. The album, much played by BBC Radio 1 DJ John Peel at the time, has been re-released seven times since. Through the 1970s and beyond, McAuley recorded and worked with artists such as Viv Stanshall of the Bonzo Dog Do Da Band to Clodagh Rodgers, Jamaican reggae group The Heptones, Rick Wakeman and also as musical director with Lonnie Donegan on guitar and fiddle.

In 1982, his songwriting came to fruition when he and John Gustafson of Roxy Music penned the hit song, "Dear John", for Status Quo. Meanwhile they formed Rowdy with Billy Bremner (The Pretenders) and Les Binks (Judas Priest).

In the late 1980s, McAuley led for several years the Celtic rock outfit Poor Mouth (band), recording the album Gael Force (album). McAuley later began to write more solo driven material and since breaking up the band in the 1990s, he has released several albums under his own name.

Recently McAuley and Dyble reformed Trader Horne for a one-off London gig, which was awarded four stars in a review in The Times and his songwriting was recognised once again in the Hollywood movies Humble Pie, American Fork (William Baldwin) and Stranger Things (Winona Ryder).

In 2017, McAuley played at the "A New Day Festival" in Kent, England and finished writing his memoirs titled I, Sideman. Up until 2020 he was working as the Jackie McAuley Band with PierLuigi Cioci and Joe Toal, but since then McAuley has worked as a solo musician.

== Discography ==
- Them
  - "Here Comes The Night" (1965)
  - The Angry Young Them
  - Belfast Gypsies (1967)
- Trader Horne
  - "Sheena" (1969)
  - "Here Comes The Rain" (1970)
  - Morning Way (1970)
- Jackie McAuley
  - Jackie McAuley (1970)
  - "Turning Green" (1970)
  - "Rockin' Shoes" (1971)
- Schooners Rig
  - Producer (1982)
- Status Quo
  - "Dear John" (1982) (co-writer with John Gustafson)
- The Poor Mouth
  - Gael Force (1989)
  - Big Pete’s Birthday
- Jackie McAuley
  - Headspin (1991)
  - Fretwork (1996)
  - Shadowboxing (1998)
  - Bad Day At Black Rock (2000)
- The Harbour Band
  - Cruisin' (2004)
- Jackie McAuley & the Regular Gas Band
  - Them Good Old Songs (2015)
- Jackie McAuley Band
  - The Radio Waves (EP, 2016)
- Jackie McAuley
  - The Cherryvale Files (2020)
