= I Dream to Sleep =

Single by H_{2}O

from the album Faith
- B-side: "Burn to Win"
- Released: 1983
- Genre: New wave; electronic; synth-pop
- Length: 3:51
- Label: RCA
- Songwriter(s): Ian Donaldson; Ross Alcock; Colin Gavigan; Pete Keane; Kenny Dorman; Colin Ferguson
- Producer(s): Tony Cox

H_{2}O singles chronology
"Hollywood Dream" (1981)	"I Dream to Sleep" (1983)	"Just Outside of Heaven" (1983)

"I Dream to Sleep" is a song by the Scottish pop band H_{2}O, composed by all of the band members and produced by Tony Cox. Initially released in 1983, the song was later included on H_{2}O's debut studio album, Faith (1984). The single features the non-album track, "Burn to Win" as its B-side, which was later included as a bonus track on the CD reissue of the Faith album. It was their first release on the label RCA and it peaked at No. 17 on the UK Singles Chart.

Lead singer Ian Donaldson was inspired to write the song's lyrics after seeing Yazoo perform "Only You" on Top of the Pops. It makes reference to and quotes David Bowie's song "Young Americans", of whom Donaldson was a fan.

== Track listing ==
- 12" maxi
1. "I Dream to Sleep" – 5:21
2. "I Dream to Sleep" (Short Version) – 3:51
3. "Burn to Win" – 3:34
4. "I Dream to Sleep" (Engineer's Mix) – 3:47
- 7" single
1. "I Dream to Sleep" – 3:51
2. "Burn to Win" – 3:34

== Chart performance ==
Chart	Position
UK Singles Chart	17
