= Faith (H2O album) =

Studio album by H_{2}O
- Released: 1984
- Recorded: October 1983 – March 1984
- Studio: Livingston Studios, London
- Genre: Pop; new wave; electronic; synthpop
- Length: 38:38
- Label: RCA
- Producer: Tony Cox; David Bascombe

Singles from Faith
- 1. "I Dream to Sleep" Released: 1983; 2. "Just Outside of Heaven" Released: 1983; 3. "All That Glitters (Rusts in Time)" Released: 1983; 4. "Who'll Stop the Rain" Released: 1984

Professional ratings
Review scores
Source	Rating
AllMusic	2/5 stars

Faith is the debut and only studio album by the Scottish pop band H_{2}O. It was originally released in 1984 on the label RCA. The album was recorded over a period of five months between October 1983 and March 1984, in sessions that took place at Livingston Studios, in London. It features their bestselling singles, "I Dream to Sleep" and "Just Outside of Heaven", both of which preceded the album being released the year before.

In 2009, a digitally remastered CD of the album was released with six bonus tracks by Cherry Red.

== Critical reception ==
Pemberton Roach of AllMusic gave the album two out of five stars and called the album "an obscure gem of 1980's New Romantic synth pop" adding that Faith "makes a strong bid for lost classic status."

== Track listing ==
All tracks are written by Ian Donaldson, Ross Alcock, Colin Gavigan, Pete Keane, Kenny Dorman and Colin Ferguson, except where noted.

Side one
No.	Title	Writer(s)	Length
1.	"Success"		3:23
2.	"I Dream to Sleep"		3:59
3.	"Who'll Stop the Rain"	Ian Donaldson; Ross Alcock	3:33
4.	"Just Outside of Heaven"		4:18
5.	"Leonard"	Donaldson; Alcock	4:25

Side two
No.	Title	Writer(s)	Length
6.	"Action"		3:35
7.	"Sundays Are Blue"		3:22
8.	"All That Glitters (Rusts in Time)"		3:43
9.	"Another Face"		4:07
10.	"It's in You"	Donaldson; Alcock	4:13
Total length:			38:38

2009 reissue bonus tracks
No.	Title	Length
11.	"Burn to Win"	3:36
12.	"Stranger to Stranger"	2:57
13.	"Turn Back in Anger"	2:49
14.	"Telling Lies"	3:28
15.	"Just Outside Heaven (Extended Mix)"	4:19
16.	"Just Outside Heaven (6AM Mix)"	5:34

== Personnel ==
H_{2}O

- Ian Donaldson – vocals
- Ross Alcock – keyboards; synthesizer; piano; vocoder
- Colin Gavigan – saxophone
- Pete Keane – guitar
- Kenny Dorman – drums; percussion
- Colin Ferguson – bass guitar

Additional personnel

- Sylvia James – backing vocals on "Just Outside of Heaven"
- Dee Lewis – backing vocals on "Just Outside of Heaven"
- Shirley Lewis – backing vocals on "Just Outside of Heaven"

Production team

- Tony Cox – producer
- David Bascombe – producer; engineer
- Felix Kendall – assistant engineer
- Andrew Christian – art direction
- Shoot That Tiger! – design
- Allan Ballard – photography
