= Just Outside of Heaven =

Single by H_{2}O

from the album Faith
- B-side: "Stranger to Stranger"
- Released: 1983
- Genre: New wave; electronic; synth-pop
- Length: 4:18
- Label: RCA
- Songwriter(s): Ian Donaldson; Ross Alcock; Colin Gavigan; Pete Keane; Kenny Dorman; Colin Ferguson
- Producer(s): Tony Cox

H_{2}O singles chronology
| "I Dream to Sleep" (1983) | "Just Outside of Heaven" (1983) | "All That Glitters (Rusts in Time)" (1983) |

Music video
- "Just Outside of Heaven" on YouTube

"Just Outside of Heaven" is a song by the Scottish pop band H_{2}O, composed by all of the band members and produced by Tony Cox. Initially released in 1983, the song was later included on H_{2}O's debut studio album, Faith (1984). The single features the non-album track, "Stranger to Stranger" as its B-side, which was later included as a bonus track on the CD reissue of the Faith album. It was their last single to make the Top 40 on the UK singles chart, peaking at No. 38.

== Track listing ==
- 12" Maxi
1. "Just Outside of Heaven (Extended Mix)"
2. "Stranger to Stranger"
3. "Just Outside of Heaven (6 A.M. Mix)"
- 7" Single
1. "Just Outside of Heaven"
2. "Stranger to Stranger"

== Chart performance ==
| Chart | Position |
|---|---|
| UK singles chart | 38 |
