= On the Shore =

Studio album by Trees
- Released: January 1971
- Recorded: October 1970
- Studios: Sound Techniques, Chelsea, London
- Genre: Folk rock
- Length: 49:11
- Label: CBS
- Producer: Tony Cox

Trees chronology
The Garden of Jane Delawney (1970)	On the Shore (1971)

On the Shore is the second, and final, album by British folk rock band Trees. It was recorded in October 1970, and released in January 1971 on CBS Records (64168). It was later released on CD by the BGO label.

Sleeve design by Hipgnosis. The cover photographs were taken at The Hill Garden, part of Inverforth House, Hampstead Heath in North West London, designed by landscape architect Thomas Mawson. The model in the photo was Katie Meehan, daughter of Tony Meehan from The Shadows.

== Track listing ==
1. "Soldiers Three" (Traditional) – 1:51
2. "Murdoch" (Bias Boshell) – 5:10
3. "Streets of Derry" (Traditional) – 7:32
4. "Sally Free and Easy" (Cyril Tawney) – 10:11
5. "Fool" (Boshell, David Costa) – 5:21
6. "Adam's Toon" (A. Della Halle) – 1:10
7. "Geordie" (Traditional) – 5:06
8. "While the Iron is Hot" (Boshell) – 3:21
9. "Little Sadie" (Traditional) – 3:11
10. "Polly on the Shore" (Traditional) – 6:08

== 2007 SONY/BMG release "disc 2" ==
1. "Soldiers Three" (remix)
2. "Murdoch" (remix)
3. "Streets of Derry" (remix)
4. "Fool" (remix)
5. "Geordie" (remix)
6. "Little Sadie" (remix)
7. "Polly on the Shore" (remix)
8. "Forest Fire" (1971 BBC session)
9. "Little Black Cloud" (1970 demo)

== Musicians and production ==
Trees

- Celia Humphris - vocals
- Barry Clarke - lead guitar, dulcimer
- David Costa - acoustic and electric 12-string guitar, mandolin
- Bias Boshell - bass, vocals, piano, acoustic 12-string guitar
- Unwin Brown - drums, vocals, tambourine

Technical

- Produced by Tony Cox
- Engineered by Vic Gramm
- Originally recorded October 1970 at Sound Techniques, London
- on CD 1;
  - Tony Cox - bass (track 04), arrangement (track 08)
  - Michael Jefferies - harp (track 08)
  - Partly recorded at Island Studios, London. Engineer: Roger Quested.
  - Remastered: January 2007 by Paschal Byrne, Audio Archive, London
- on CD 2;
  - Pre-production and restoration by Bias Boshell
  - Additional keyboards arranged and played by Bias Boshell
  - Acoustic guitar intro to track 02 recorded by Raf Costa
  - Tracks 01–07 remixed January 2007 by Adrian Hardy, Bias Boshell and David Costa at Panic, London
  - Track 08 was produced by John Muir and recorded for the Bob Harris Show, BBC Radio 1, date of first transmission 8 February 1971. Remastered by Adrian Hardy at Panic, London
