= Heaven (British band) =

Heaven were a British jazz-influenced rock band from Portsmouth who appeared at the Isle of Wight Festivals in 1969 and 1970, when managed by festival compere Rikki Farr. The band released one album in 1971 before splitting up.

== History ==
The band was formed in 1968 by Brian Kemp (bass guitar, banjo, vocals) (1945 – 25 September 1992, Oueen Alexandra Hospital, Cosham, Hampshire, England), Andy Scarisbrick (lead guitar, vocals) (1951 – 2006), Ray "Ollie" Holloway (tenor saxophone, flute) (born 1947), Dave Gautrey (trumpet, flugelhorn) (born 1945), Ray King (baritone & tenor saxophone, clarinet, penny whistle, vocals) (born 1946), Mick Cooper (piano, organ) (born 1945), and Malcolm "Nobby" Glover (drums) (1948 – 5 February 2018). Several members had previously played in a soul band, the Universal Trash Band. They stated their influences to be West Coast bands such as Love and Moby Grape, and after performing on the opening free day of the 1969 Isle of Wight Festival they recorded unissued tracks in the Spark Records studio below Southern Music in Denmark Street, London.

The original band split up in early 1970. However, King, Gautrey and Glover then reconstituted Heaven with new members Terry Scott Jr. (vocals) (born 1949, Southampton, Hampshire, England), Barry Paul (lead guitar), and John Gordon (bass), who had all previously been in another band, Paper. Farr took over as manager, and found them a place on the 1970 Isle of Wight Festival stage on the same day as Jimi Hendrix, Leonard Cohen, Free, Donovan, Jethro Tull, Pentangle, and The Moody Blues. By that time, Paul had been replaced by Eddie Harnett (lead guitar), and the band added Dave Horler (keyboards, trombone), Butch Hudson (trumpet, flugelhorn), and Derek Somerville (saxophone, flute, trombone), giving the band a much more brass-oriented sound that was sometimes compared to Chicago and Blood, Sweat & Tears. They were immediately offered a recording contract by CBS Records, and recorded their only album, Brass Rock 1, a double album with a lavish gatefold sleeve which appeared in 1971. Most of the tracks were written by Eddie Harnett. The band also appeared in the final edition of the BBC 2 music show Disco 2 in July 1971.

The band is described at AllMusic as "progressive with nary a commercial bone in their body, a wild amalgamation of bluesy, R&B inspired prog rock, with pastoral leanings and a strong improvisational bent". The reviewer described the album as "stunning", and "an awe-inspiring set, a jazz-rock-folk-blues fusion that trod down virtually unexplored musical avenues. But even for the time, the album was just too adventurous, with poor sales leading to Heaven's demise". Despite critical acclaim the record failed to sell, and the band split up soon afterwards.

== Later activities ==
Singer Terry Scott Jr. formed a third version of Heaven which toured in Europe, then signed a contract as a solo singer with CBS in France. He released several singles in France in the 1970s and a solo album, Survivor, in 1979. He continues to perform with his band in Normandy.

After the original Heaven split up, Mick Cooper continued to play in local bands. Lead guitarist Andy Scarisbrick was in several local bands, including Alice and country rock outfit Panama Red, eventually relocating to Bristol in the mid 1970s and joining the Overlanders. He later moved to London and was a founder member of the Mental Health Act. He died in Islington, North London in 2006. Guitarist and songwriter Eddie Harnett also played in various local bands before emigrating to the US where he died in 2011. Barry Paul was later a member of the Heavy Metal Kids, then joined Savoy Brown in the early 1980s and later ran a recording studio in Los Angeles. John Gordon went on to play with Highway, and then with Alan Price, Bill Haley, and Joe Brown. He latterly worked with Bernie Marsden and various gigging bands around London. The other members worked outside the music business. Brian Kemp died in 1992 following a road accident; subsequently Cooper, Holloway, Scarisbrick, Glover, and Somerville reunited as Heaven for a one-off tribute performance.

Brass Rock 1 was reissued on CD by Cherry Red Records in 2008.
