= Jackie Morris =

British writer and illustrator (born 1961)

- Born: 1961 (age 64–65); Birmingham, England, UK
- Education: Bath Academy of Art
- Occupations: Illustrator, writer
- Writing career
- Genre: Children's

Jackie Morris (born 1961) is a British writer and illustrator. She was shortlisted for the Kate Greenaway Medal in 2016 and won it in 2019 for her illustration of The Lost Words, voted the most beautiful book of 2016 by UK booksellers. She is a recipient of the Tir na n-Og Award for children's book Seal Children.

== Life ==
Morris was born in Birmingham in 1961. Her family moved to Evesham when she was four. As a child she was told that she couldn't be an artist, but despite this she learned to paint. Morris went to High school at Prince Henry's High School in Evesham, Hereford College of Arts and afterward the Bath Academy of Art.

On leaving college she found work in editorial, illustrating magazines like Radio Times, New Statesman, New Society and Country Living. She worked for years illustrating books and in 2016, she was shortlisted for the Kate Greenaway Medal for Something About a Bear. The book includes her water colours of different types of bear.

She lives in a small house by the sea in Wales, painting and writing.

== Career ==
The Lost Words is a book of "spells" by Robert Macfarlane with illustrations by Morris. The book has clues to words like acorn, blackberry and conker. The book was inspired by 21st-century editions of the Oxford Junior Dictionary in which some words like kingfisher associated with nature were omitted in order to include technical terms like attachment, broadband and chatroom. In 2017, Laurence Rose organised a protest letter to the dictionary and it was signed by Margaret Atwood, Sara Maitland, Michael Morpurgo, Andrew Motion, Macfarlane, and Morris. Much debate ensued but the creative outcome was an idea for joint work by McFarlane and Morris. This book was voted the most beautiful book by UK booksellers in 2016.

An exhibition of The Lost Words was held at Compton Verney in 2017, featuring immersive floor to ceiling graphics of the poems and illustrations in the book. The exhibition subsequently toured Britain, hosted by the Foundling Museum in London, Inverleith House in Edinburgh, Royal Albert Museum in Exeter, and the North York Moors National Park’s art gallery in Danby.

A Welsh language version of The Lost Words 'Geiriau Diflanedig' was published by Graffeg in 2019 with author Mererid Hopwood adapting Macfarlane's acrostic spell-poems within Morris' illustrations.

An audiobook of The Lost Words has been narrated by Guy Garvey, Edith Bowman, Benjamin Zephaniah, and Cerys Matthews, with ambient sound recordings Chris Watson.

== Works ==
As author and illustrator

- Cities in the Sea (1996) with Sian Lewis
- The Seal Children (2004)
- Can You See a Little Bear (2005) with James Mayhew
- Compilation and illustration of The Barefoot Book of Classic Poems (2006)
- The Snow Leopard (2007)
- Tell Me a Dragon (2009)
- The Ice Bear (2010)
- The Cat and the Fiddle: A Treasury of Nursery Rhymes (2011)
- Queen of the Sky (2011)
- I am Cat (2012)
- Song of the Golden Hare (2013)
- East of the Sun, West of the Moon (2013)
- Words of Little Evie in the Wild Wood (2013) illustrated by Catherine Hyde
- Something About a Bear (2014)
- The Wild Swans (2015)
- Cat Walk (2015)
- The Quiet Music of Gently Falling Snow (2016)
- The While Fox (2016)
- The Lost Words (2017) with Robert Macfarlane
- Words of Mrs Noah's Pockets (2018) illustrated by James Mayhew
- The Secret of the Tattered Shoes (2019) with Ehsan Abdollahi
- The Lost Spells (2020) with Robert Macfarlane
- Words of Mrs Noah's Garden (2020) illustrated by James Mayhew
- Words of Mrs Noah's Song (2022) illustrated by James Mayhew
- The Book of Birds (2026), with Robert Macfarlane

As illustrator

- The Snow Whale (1996) by Caroline Pitcher
- Out of the Ark: Stories from the World's Religions (1996) by Anita Ganeri
- The Time of the Lion (1998) by Caroline Pitcher
- The Fourth Wise Man (1998) by Susan Summers
- Stories from the Stars: Greek Myths of the Zodiac (1998) by Juliet Sharman-Burke
- Lord of the Dance (1998) by Sydney Carter
- Grandmother's Song (2000) by Barbara Soros
- New edition of How the Whale Became (1963) by Ted Hughes (2000)
- Marianna and the Merchild (2000) by Caroline Pitcher
- Parables: Stories Jesus Told (2000) by Mary Hoffman
- Animals of the Bible (2003) by Mary Hoffman
- Lord of the Forest (2004) by Caroline Pitcher
- Little One, We Knew You'd Come (2006) by Sally Lloyd-Jones
- Singing to the Sun (2008) by Vivian French
- Starlight Sailor (2013) by James Mayhew
- Walking on Water: Miracles Jesus Worked (2017) by Mary Hoffman
- Lost and Found: Parables Jesus Told (2017) by Mary Hoffman

Notable artwork

- Cover art for many books by Robin Hobb
- Three Hares print
- Judy Dyble's album, Talking with Strangers, featured her art for its second pressing

== Awards and recognitions ==
Awards

- 1997 Tir na n-O Award for Cities in the Sea
- 2005 Tir na n-O Award for The Seal Children
- 2017 Books Are My Bag Readers' Award for The Lost Words
- 2019 Kate Greenaway Medal for The Lost Words
- 2026 Wainwright Prize Book of the Year, and category winner for Illustrative books, for The Book of Birds, with Robert Macfarlane

Shortlisted

- 2016 Kate Greenaway Medal for Something About a Bear
