= A Young Person's Guide to King Crimson =

Compilation album by King Crimson
- Released: February 1976
- Recorded: 1968–1974
- Genre: Progressive rock
- Length: 74:12
- Labels: Island (UK); Atlantic Records (Canada); Polydor Records (UK); E.G. Records; Virgin Records; Discipline Global Mobile
- Producer: King Crimson

King Crimson chronology
USA (1975)	A Young Person's Guide to King Crimson (1976)	Discipline (1981)

Singles from A Young Person's Guide to King Crimson
- 1. "Epitaph" Released: 20 February 1976

Professional ratings
Review scores
Source	Rating
AllMusic	4.5/5 stars

A Young Person's Guide to King Crimson is a 2-LP compilation album by English progressive rock band King Crimson, released in 1976. At the time of release, the band had been disbanded for nearly two years. Guitarist Robert Fripp selected the tracks for inclusion.

Its name is most likely derived either from the famous orchestral work The Young Person's Guide to the Orchestra by composer Benjamin Britten or the 1960s television series Young Person's Guide to the Orchestra, created by conductor/composer Leonard Bernstein.

The gatefold sleeve featured artwork by Scottish artist Fergus Hall, with the front cover being The Landscape Player and the back cover being Earth. Included as part of the package was a booklet, replete with photographs, and detailing gig history and notable events; this was compiled by Robert Fripp from his own archive. The only studio album not represented is Lizard (1970).

To date, its sole CD release has been in Japan, in 1990. This 2-CD set, which faithfully duplicated the vinyl running order, included a reproduction of the booklet, scaled-down. Playing times are approximately 40 minutes long for CD1 and 35 minutes for CD2.

== Track listing ==
=== Side one ===
No.	Title	Writer(s)	Original album	Length
1.	"Epitaph" (including "March for No Reason" and "Tomorrow and Tomorrow")	Robert Fripp, Ian McDonald, Greg Lake, Michael Giles, Peter Sinfield	In the Court of the Crimson King	8:52
2.	"Cadence and Cascade" (Abridged version)	Fripp, Sinfield	In the Wake of Poseidon	3:36
3.	"Ladies of the Road"	Fripp, Sinfield	Islands	5:27
4.	"I Talk to the Wind"	McDonald, Sinfield	Early version (Note: Recorded at 93A Brondesbury Road, London, England, UK, July 1968; it differs from the version released on In the Court of the Crimson King. The most notable difference is in the vocals, which are sung by Judy Dyble (Fairport Convention) rather than Greg Lake. This version is also available on The Brondesbury Tapes (1968) under the name of Giles, Giles and Fripp (VP235CD))	3:15

=== Side two ===
No.	Title	Writer(s)	Original album	Length
1.	"Red"	Fripp	Red	6:18
2.	"Starless"	David Cross, Fripp, John Wetton, Bill Bruford, Richard Palmer-James	Red	12:17

=== Side three ===
No.	Title	Writer(s)	Original album	Length
1.	"The Night Watch"	Fripp, Palmer-James, Wetton	Starless and Bible Black	4:38
2.	"Book of Saturday"	Fripp, Wetton, Palmer-James	Larks' Tongues in Aspic	2:52
3.	"Peace: A Theme"	Fripp	In the Wake of Poseidon	1:14
4.	"Cat Food" (Abridged version)	Fripp, McDonald, Sinfield	"Cat Food/Groon" single (Note: unedited version available on In the Wake of Poseidon)	2:43
5.	"Groon"	Fripp	"Cat Food/Groon" single	3:30
6.	"Coda from Larks' Tongues in Aspic (Part I)"	Cross, Fripp, Wetton, Bruford, Jamie Muir	Larks' Tongues in Aspic	2:09

=== Side four ===
No.	Title	Writer(s)	Original album	Length
1.	"Moonchild" (Abridged version)	Fripp, McDonald, Lake, Giles, Sinfield	In the Court of the Crimson King	2:24
2.	"Trio"	Cross, Fripp, Wetton, Bruford	Starless and Bible Black	5:36
3.	"The Court of the Crimson King" (including "The Return of the Fire Witch" and "The Dance of the Puppets")	McDonald, Sinfield	In the Court of the Crimson King	9:21
