= Phil Sayer =

Voice artist, newsreader and radio presenter

Philip Clift Sayer (18 May 1953 – 14 April 2016) was an English voice artist, newsreader and radio presenter. He was one half of the Sayer Hamilton voice studio, based in Bolton, Greater Manchester, in partnership with his wife, Elinor Hamilton.

== Early life and career ==
Sayer was born Philip Clift, on 18 May 1953, in Norwich, Norfolk, the son of Cyril Clift, a town planner. His parents’ marriage was not a success, and his mother Hazel moved the family to Liverpool, where she later remarried. He was educated at Merchant Taylors' Boys' School at Great Crosby on Merseyside, where he was a member of the successful public speaking team.

From 1976 Sayer, having adopted his stepfather's surname as a stage name, was a newsreader on BBC North West Tonight, where he remained for ten years. After that he was a presenter on several radio stations, including Piccadilly Radio, where he began in 1976, Red Rose Radio, BBC GMR (now BBC Radio Manchester), Radio City, Jazz FM and Smooth FM.

From the early 1990s onwards, Sayer's voice was used at many British railway stations, particularly those in Southern and Western England, providing announcements regarding train arrivals, departures and cancellations or delays, as well as general information for the travelling public. At many of these stations, his voice would be used alongside that of Celia Drummond, who Sayer would refer to as his "railway wife". Sayer could also frequently be heard on the London Underground system, warning passengers to ”mind the gap” and "stand clear of the doors please". Sayer's obituary in The New York Times suggested that the 'mind the gap' warning is "one of the system's most distinctive features". Rail staff referred to his voice as "Metal Mickey".

Sayer's voice may also be heard in announcements on the West Midlands Metro, on The Smiler rollercoaster at Alton Towers, and on the audio at the Beatles Story Exhibition, Albert Dock Liverpool.

== Death ==
On 4 April 2016 it was announced, on the Sayer Hamilton website, that due to a rapid and unexpected decline in Sayer's health, the company was temporarily closing for business and that Sayer would be retiring. Sayer died of oesophageal cancer on 14 April. Announcing his death on Facebook, his wife wrote that "We are sorry to announce that this service terminates here", echoing the wording of a train announcement. He had four children, two from his first marriage and twin boys from his marriage to Hamilton.
