= The Conspirators (band) =

- Origin: Bedale, England
- Genres: indie, folk
- Years active: 2006 to present
- Labels: Transcend Media Group, Reeltime Records
- Website: www.theconspirators.co.uk www.facebook.com/theconspiratorsband

The Conspirators were a British northern indie / folk band. The band consisted of five members (as of 2008).

In 2008, the band signed a management deal with Jon Shellers Brilliant Management, and released the double A-side single featuring Judy Dyble, former Fairport Convention vocalist. (Who was also managed by Sheller). The single included a remake of Fairport Convention's song "One Sure Thing" and The Conspirators song "Take Me To Your Leader". It reached No.7 in the official uk indie singles chart, spending 3 weeks in the top 10.

The promotion for this single saw Dyble make two rare live appearances, at the Harrogate International Conference Centre, and at an in-store live gig at HMV's superstore in Leeds city centre on 3 March 2008.

In 2012 Conspirators released their debut album "What's Going On". The album featured guest performances from Dodgy lead guitarist Andy Miller, as well as Echobelly's Glenn Johansson. In 2017, most of the 2008 named members reformed under the new name The Doubtful Bottle.

== Members ==
- John Gillies - rhythm guitar/vocals
- Genevieve Parker - vocals
- Laura Goodacre - Drums
- Mike Cinnamond - Bass
- Jim Beadle - drums
- Nathan Reeve - bass
- Jim Gillies - keys
- Darren Banner - lead guitar
- Lee Potter - lead guitar (The Doubtful Bottle)
- Marco Ramsay - Bass (The Doubtful Bottle)
