= H2O (Scottish band) =

Scottish pop band

H_{2}O
- Origin: Glasgow, Scotland
- Genres: New wave; synth-pop
- Years active: 1978–1985; 1986-1987; 1993; 1994; 2003
- Labels: Spock; RCA; Legend
- Past members: Ian Donaldson; Kenny Dorman; Alan McGee; Andrew Innes; David Wells; Frank O'Hare; George Sinclair; Colin Ferguson; Ross Alcock; John Harton; Pete Kean; David Edgar; Ali McLeod; Colin Gavigan; Edmund Farquhar; Johnny McBrier

H_{2}O were a Scottish pop band that formed in Glasgow in 1978. The band had two UK top 40 hits in 1983 with the singles "I Dream to Sleep" and "Just Outside of Heaven".

== History ==
H_{2}O were formed in Glasgow in 1978 by lead singer Ian Donaldson (who used to be a member of punk rock band Skroo), bassist Alan McGee (who later managed rock band Oasis in the 1990s – but was eventually replaced by Colin Ferguson), drummer Kenny Dorman (who, latterly, introduced keyboardist Ross Alcock, both of them from Largs in North Ayrshire), guitarist David Wells and saxophonist Colin Gavigan, who all participated in the writing of the band's compositions. Andrew Innes had a very short stint as guitarist, but together with Alan McGee the two moved to London to form The Laughing Apple. H_{2}O's first independent single, "Hollywood Dream" was released in 1981 on their own independent label Spock Records. During this time they managed to garner some radio airplay, initially via Slik drummer Kenny Hyslop and on BBC Scotland's Street Buzz. In the 1980s they were supported by the band "Synchronisation". in the 110 bar in Ayr.

In 1982, with the addition of new guitarist Pete Kean, the band signed a recording contract with RCA Records. Their biggest chart success (as they opened up for Kajagoogoo on their UK tour) was "I Dream to Sleep", which peaked at No. 17 on the UK Singles Chart in June 1983. Their follow-up single "Just Outside of Heaven" reached No. 38 later the same year. The following year, they released their only studio album Faith, but further success eluded them. In 1985, as a result, the band broke-up soon after.

Despite the break-up, Donaldson and Alcock continued to write and demo new material, in an attempt to obtain a new record deal. In early 1986, with the help of John O'Reilly who managed indie rock band the Bluebells, they reformed once more, but this time with former Skroo guitarist Frank O'Hare, drummer David Edgar and bassist George Sinclair. They signed to Legend Records, a fledgling record company which offered the best chance of keeping H_{2}O a priority band. At this point they parted ways with John O'Reilly due to professional differences.

The band released the single "Blue Diamond" which just failed to reach the top 40 in 1987, despite a lot of airplay from major radio stations. Frank O'Hare left the band in late 1987 due to creative differences and family commitments and was replaced by former Hipsway guitarist Ali McLeod, but following the closure of Legend Records the band broke-up again.

Since then, they still occasionally reunited for a few local gigs, notably in 1993 for Radio Clyde's Cash for Kids, in 1994 for the opening gig for the newly converted venue The Renfrew Ferry, and in King Tut's in June 2003 for 20 Years of Dream to Sleep.

Donaldson (no relation to Ian Stuart Donaldson) has since pursued a solo career and was in a band called FourGoodMen, alongside Bruce Watson and former Simple Minds members Derek Forbes and Mick MacNeil. Ross Alcock returned to solo work with 2023's Dreamsongs - a collection written during Covid-19 lockdowns - and formed The Sound of Water in November 2024, whose first album, Life In Gravity Town, was released in February 2025.

== Discography ==
Studio album

Year	Title	Label
1984	Faith	RCA

Singles

Year	Title	B-side	Album	UK Singles Chart
1981	"Hollywood Dream"	"Children"	Non-album single	–
1983	"I Dream to Sleep"	"Burn to Win"	Faith	17
1983	"Just Outside of Heaven"	"Stranger to Stranger"	Faith	38
1983	"All That Glitters (Rusts in Time)"	"Turn Back in Anger"	Faith	–
1984	"Who'll Stop the Rain"	"Telling Lies"	Faith	–
1984	"You Take My Breath Away"	"Leonard"	Non-album single	93
1987	"Blue Diamond"	"Go On"	Non-album single	77
