= David Costa (graphic designer) =

English graphic designer, art director and musician

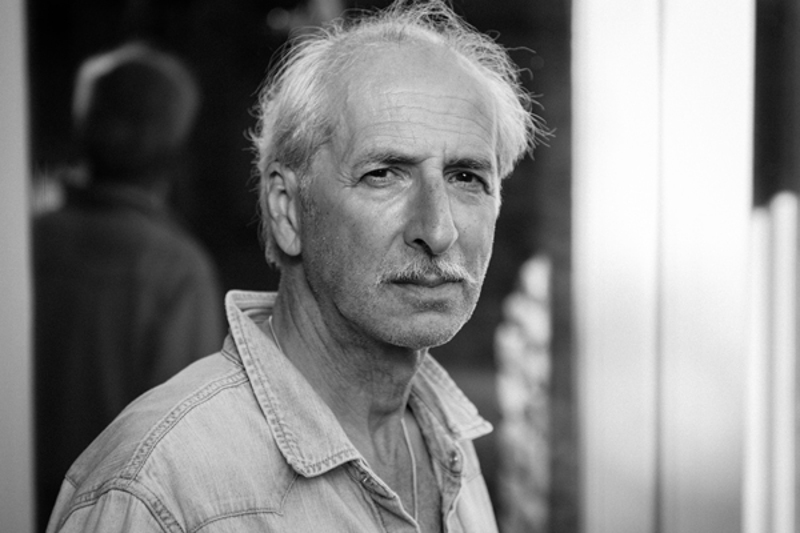
- 2016 photo by Judith Costa

Background information
- Birth name: David Costa
- Born: 18 November 1947 (age 77); Westminster, London, England
- Genres: Folk rock
- Occupation(s): Graphic Designer, Art Director, Musician
- Years active: 1969–present
- Labels: CBS, Rocket, Sony

David Costa (born 18 November 1947) is an English graphic designer, art director and musician. Notable design collaborations include those for Queen, Elton John, Anastacia, Eric Clapton, George Harrison, The Beatles, The Moody Blues, Genesis, The Rolling Stones and Phil Collins.

== Early life ==
Costa was born in London, England. His grandfather was a songwriter and pianist with the Savoy Orpheans. His father was the singer and radio presenter Sam Costa. He attended Merchant Taylors' public school, pursuing Fine Arts at the University of East Anglia in 1966.

== Career ==
In early 1969 he left university and brought together Barry Clarke, Bias Boshell, Unwin Brown and Celia Humphris to form the folk-rock band Trees, subsequently recording two albums: The Garden of Jane Delawney and On the Shore. In 1971 he left Trees to pursue freelance graphic design, eventually with Dick James Music in 1972, leading to a sequence of album sleeves for Elton John, and subsequently as art director in the UK offices of Rocket Records. During this period, Costa and guitarist Barry Clarke went on to write, record and produce the band Casablanca and subsequent eponymous album in 1973.

Throughout the 1970s and 1980s freelance design projects included work with ex-Beatles press officer Derek Taylor to instigate the "Brighton Pier" label for Warner Bros. Records UK. From 1977 through 1979 Costa ran his studio Jubilee Graphics from the previous offices of the Rocket Record Company in Wardour Street, London. Over the ensuing decade he worked as a freelance designer/art director on the re-launched Tatler magazine with Tina Brown; redesign and art direction on the relaunched The Field magazine; early visual proposals for Today, Eddie Shah's publication that pioneered the use of computer systems with photo-typesetting and full-colour offset printing, and, the redesign and frequent illustration of covers for Encounter magazine.

== Discography ==
=== Musician ===
Year	Album	Artist	Label
1969	The Garden of Jane Delawney	Trees	CBS Records, 2007 Sony Rewind, Sunbeam Records
1970	On the Shore	Trees	CBS Records, 2007 Sony Rewind, Sunbeam Records
1973	Casablanca	Casablanca	Rocket

=== Graphic art, design and packaging ===
Year	Album	Artist	Label
1973	Goodbye Yellow Brick Road	Elton John	DJM
1975	A Night at the Opera	Queen	EMI, Elektra
1976	A Day at the Races	Queen	EMI, Elektra
1976	Blue Moves	Elton John	Rocket
1977	Elton John's Greatest Hits Volume II	Elton John	DJM
1977	First Thing in the Morning	Kiki Dee	Rocket
1978	A Single Man	Elton John	Rocket
1983	Secret Messages	Electric Light Orchestra	Jet
1987	Cloud Nine	George Harrison	Dark Horse Records
1987	Live in Australia	Elton John	Rocket, MCA
1988	Traveling Wilburys Vol. 1	Traveling Wilburys	Wilbury/Warner Bros. Records
1988	Reg Strikes Back	Elton John	Rocket
1989	Sleeping with the Past	Elton John	Rocket
1989	The Best of Dark Horse	George Harrison	Dark Horse Records
1990	Traveling Wilburys Vol. 3	Traveling Wilburys	Wilbury/Warner Bros. Records
1990	The Very Best of Elton John	Elton John	DJM
1990	To Be Continued...	Elton John	Rocket
1990	Serious Hits... Live!	Phil Collins	Virgin, Atlantic
1991	24 Nights	Eric Clapton	Duck Records/Reprise Records
1992	Rare Masters	Elton John	Polydor
1992	The One	Elton John	Rocket
1993	Are You Experienced? (repackage)	Jimi Hendrix	MCA
1993	Axis: Bold as Love (repackage)	Jimi Hendrix	MCA
1993	Electric Ladyland (repackage)	Jimi Hendrix	MCA
1993	The Ultimate Experience	Jimi Hendrix	MCA
1994	From the Cradle	Eric Clapton	Duck Records/Warner Bros. Records
1994	Time Traveller	Moody Blues	Polydor, PolyGram
1995	Made in England	Elton John	Rocket
1995	The Finer Things	Steve Winwood	Island
1996	Crossroads 2	Eric Clapton	Polydor
1996	Golden Heart	Mark Knopfler	Vertigo, Warner
1996	Dance into the Light	Phil Collins	Atlantic
1997	Anyway the Wind Blows: The Anthology	J. J. Cale	Universal
1997	Calling All Stations	Genesis	Virgin, Atlantic
1998	Genesis Archive 1967–75	Genesis	Virgin, Atlantic
1998	Pilgrim	Eric Clapton	Reprise Records
1998	Hits	Phil Collins	Virgin, Atlantic
1999	Turn It On Again: The Hits	Genesis	Virgin, Atlantic
2000	Riding with the King	Eric Clapton	Duck Records/Reprise Records
2000	Genesis Archive 2: 1976–1992	Genesis	Virgin, Atlantic
2000	The Very Best of Cat Stevens	Cat Stevens	PolyGram
2001	Vagabonds Kings Warriors Angels	Thin Lizzy	Vertigo
2001	Re-release of All Things Must Pass	George Harrison	Gnome Records
2003	Let It Be... Naked	The Beatles	Apple
2004	Love Songs: A Compilation... Old and New	Phil Collins	Atlantic/Rhino/Virgin
2004	The Capitol Albums, Volume 1	The Beatles	Apple
2005	The Concert for Bangladesh	George Harrison	Apple
2006	The Captain & the Kid	Elton John	Mercury/Interscope

== Books ==
=== Graphic art, design and packaging ===
Year	Title	Author/Artist	Publisher
1990	Blinds & Shutters	Michael Cooper	Genesis Publications
1991	24 Nights	Eric Clapton/Peter Blake	Genesis Publications
1994	Liverpool Days	Astrid Kirchherr/Max Scheler	Genesis Publications
1994	Lady Cottington’s Pressed Fairy Book	Brian Froud/Terry Jones	Pavilion Books
1995	Mason's Yard to Primrose Hill	Gered Mankowitz	Genesis Publications
1995	Sometime in New York City	Bob Gruen	Genesis Publications
1996	Strange Stains and Mysterious Smells	Brian Froud/Terry Jones	Pavilion Books/Simon & Schuster
1996	Stuart: The Life and Art of Stuart Sutcliffe	Stuart Sutcliffe	Genesis Publications
1997	Raga Mala	Ravi Shankar	Genesis Publications
1998	Eye-Contact	Gered Mankowitz	Genesis Publications
1998	Wyman Shoots Chagall	Bill Wyman	Genesis Publications
1998	The Rolling Stones: A Life on the Road	Philip Dodd/The Rolling Stones	Virgin Books
1999	Hamburg Days	Astrid Kirchherr/Klaus Voormann	Genesis Publications
1999	The Vogue Book of Blondes	Kathy Phillips	Pavilion Books
2000	The Beatles Anthology	The Beatles	Cassell/Chronicle Books
2001	The Book of Rock	Philip Dodd	Pavilion Books
2002	Shooting Sex: The Definitive Guide to Undressing Beautiful Strangers	Bob Carlos Clarke	Bob Carlos Clarke
2002	Martin Guitar Masterpieces	Martin Guitars/Dick Boak	Bulfinch Press
2003	Punk: A Life Apart	Stephen Colegrave/Chris Sullivan	Cassell/Chronicle Books
2005	Drawing Blood Forty Five Years of Scarfe Uncensored	Gerald Scarfe	Little, Brown Book Group
2006	Will The Circle Be Unbroken: Country Music in America	Country Music Hall of Fame	DK Publishing
2007	Genesis: Chapter & Verse	Genesis	Weidenfeld & Nicolson
2009	Woodstock: Three Days That Rocked the World	Mike Evans, Paul Kingsbury, Museum at Bethel Woods	Sterling
2011	No Direction Home: The Life and Music of Bob Dylan	Robert Shelton	Backbeat Books
2013	Starting at Zero	Alan Douglas/Peter Neal	Bloomsbury Publishing

=== Tour programmes and books ===
Year	Artist	Tour
1976	Elton John	Louder Than Concorde
1979	Elton John & Ray Cooper	Back in the U.S.S.A.
1980	Peter Gabriel	Tour of China 1984
1985	Elton John	World Tour
1987	Prince	Sign o' the Times Tour
1990	Phil Collins	The Serious Tour
1994	Phil Collins	Both Sides of the World Tour
1997	Phil Collins	The Trip into the Light World Tour
1997 - 1998	The Rolling Stones	Bridges to Babylon
2002 - 2003	The Rolling Stones	Forty Licks
2003	Simon & Garfunkel	World Tour
2003 - 2004	Shania Twain	Up! Tour
2004 - 2005	Anastacia	Live at Last Tour
2004 - 2009	Elton John	Red Piano, Las Vegas
2005 - 2007	The Rolling Stones	A Bigger Bang
2005	Destiny's Child	DC Weekly World Tour
2006 - 2008	Elton John	The Captain and the Kid Tour
2007	Beyoncé	The Beyoncé Experience
2007	Spice Girls	The Return of the Spice Girls
2007 - 2008	The Police	The Police Reunion Tour
2007 - 2010	Elton John	Rocket Man: Greatest Hits Live
2008	Robert Plant & Alison Krauss	Raising Sand Tour
2009	Elton John & Billy Joel	Face to Face 2009
2009	Elton John	The Red Piano: Live in Europe
2009	Take That	The Circus Live
2010 - 2011	Rihanna	Last Girl on Earth Tour
2011 - 2018	Elton John	Million Dollar Piano, Las Vegas
2011	Elton John	Million Dollar Piano, 40th anniversary edition
2011	Elton John	World Tour
2014	Elton John	Showbook
