= Morning Way =

Studio album by Trader Horne
- Released: March 1970
- Genre: Psychedelic folk; folk rock
- Length: 44:51
- Label: Pye Records & Dawn Records (UK) Janus Records (US)
- Producer: Barry Murray

Singles from Morning Way
- 1. "Sheena / Morning Way" Released: 1969; 2. "Here Comes The Rain / Goodbye Mercy Kelly" Released: 1970

Professional ratings
Review scores
Source	Rating
AllMusic	4.5/5 stars

Morning Way is a 1970 album by Trader Horne. It was released by Pye Records in 1970. The album was the only release by Trader Horne and sold limited numbers at the time. The album was re-released on CD in 2008 by Esoteric Records. Through the years this LP has reached legendary status and it is considered one of the lost gems of the 1960s..

== Track listing ==
Side one
No.	Title	Writer(s)	Length
1.	"Jenny May"	Jackie McAuley	2:26
2.	"Children of Oare"	McAuley	4:03
3.	"Three Rings for Elven Kings"	McAuley	2:13
4.	"Growing Man"	McAuley	4:04
5.	"Down and Out Blues"	Arranged Ray Elliot, McAuley, Traditional	4:33
6.	"The Mixed Up Kind"	McAuley	6:26
7.	"Better Than Today"	McAuley	3:11
8.	"In My Loneliness"	McAuley	2:22
9.	"Sheena"	McAuley	2:42
10.	"The Mutant"	McAuley	2:54
11.	"Morning Way"	Judy Dyble	4:35
12.	"Velvet to Atone"	Dyble, Martin Quittenton	2:26
13.	"Luke That Never Was"	McAuley	2:56

2008 re-issue by Esoteric Records
No.	Title	Length
14.	"Goodbye Mercy Kelly" (McAuley)	3:18
15.	"Here Comes the Rain" (McAuley)	2:36

== Personnel ==
- Judy Dyble – Vocals, electric autoharp and piano
- Jackie McAuley – vocals, guitar, harpsichord, organ, piano, flute, congas and celeste
- Ray Elliot – alto flute, bass clarinet
- Andy White – drums
- John Godfrey – bass, arrangements
- Paul Winter – sleeve design
