= If I Had a Ribbon Bow =

1968 debut single by Fairport Convention

Single by Fairport Convention
- B-side: "If (Stomp)"
- Released: 23 February 1968
- Recorded: 10 August 1967
- Studio: Sound Techniques, London
- Label: Track 604020
- Songwriters: Hughie Prince, Louis Singer
- Producer: Joe Boyd for Witchseason Productions

Fairport Convention singles chronology
"If I Had a Ribbon Bow" (1968)	"Meet on the Ledge" (1968)

Official Audio
- "If I Had A Ribbon Bow" on YouTube

"If I Had a Ribbon Bow" is Fairport Convention's debut single.

The song written by Hughie Prince and Lou Singer had been recorded previously by Maxine Sullivan (a.k.a. Marietta Williams) in 1936, Odetta (1956), Carolyn Hester (1961), The Simon Sisters and Mildred Bailey. Fairport Convention recorded their first album for Track Records in 1968. Their American producer Joe Boyd suggested they release a single. He suggested the old 1930s dance song "If I Had a Ribbon Bow."

The band cut the song with singer Judy Dyble playing the harmonium. Her legs were not long enough to reach the pedals/bellows so two other members of the group had to pump them. Tristan Fry, a friend of the group, played the vibes at the beginning and end of the song. Iain Matthews, who was then a new member of the group, added a few spoken words. "If I had a Ribbon Bow" was released as a 45 with "If (Stomp)", a track from their first album, as the B-side. It was a minor hit on the BBC.

== Personnel ==
- Judy Dyble – vocals, harmonium
- Ian MacDonald – spoken word
- Richard Thompson – electric guitar
- Simon Nicol – electric guitar
- Ashley Hutchings – bass guitar
- Martin Lamble – drums

with

- Tristan Fry – vibes
