= The Garden of Jane Delawney =

Studio album by Trees
- Released: April 24, 1970
- Recorded: early 1970
- Genre: Folk rock
- Length: 47:28
- Label: CBS
- Producers: David Howells, Tony Cox

Trees chronology
The Garden of Jane Delawney (1970)	On the Shore (1971)

Professional ratings
Review scores
Source	Rating
AllMusic	3/5 stars

The Garden of Jane Delawney is the debut album of British folk rock band Trees.

== Track listing ==
All songs written by Bias Boshell except where noted.

1. "Nothing Special" (Boshell, Unwin Brown, Barry Clarke, David Costa, Celia Humphris) – 4:31
2. "The Great Silkie" (Traditional) – 5:15
3. "The Garden of Jane Delawney" – 4:19
4. "Lady Margaret" (Traditional) – 7:14
5. "Glasgerion" (Traditional) – 5:18
6. "She Moved Thro' the Fair" (Traditional) – 8:09
7. "Road" – 4:36
8. "Epitaph" – 3:26
9. "Snail's Lament" – 4:40

Bonus Tracks

1. "She Moved Thro' the Fair" (demo)
2. "Pretty Polly" (demo)
3. "Black Widow" (2008)
4. "Little Black Cloud Suite" (2008)

== Personnel ==
Trees

- Celia Humphris - vocals
- Barry Clarke - lead and acoustic guitars
- David Costa - acoustic and 12-string guitars, design, cover painting
- Bias Boshell - bass, vocals, acoustic guitar
- Unwin Brown - drums

Technical

- Mike FitzHenry, Vic Gamm - engineer

== Covers ==
- Françoise Hardy covered "The Garden of Jane Delawney" on her album If You Listen.
- All About Eve covered "The Garden of Jane Delawney" as a B-side to their single "What Kind of Fool" in 1988. They also did a similar interpretation of "She Moved Through the Fair".
- Dark Sanctuary, a French goth/neo-classical band, also covered "The Garden of Jane Delawney" on their album Exaudi Vocem Meam - Part I, released in 2005.
- Dooz Kawa, a French rap artist, sampled "The Garden of Jane Delawney" in its title "à l'arrière des bars" on its album Narcozik #2, released in 2014 (at 1:01).
