= Alan Black (broadcaster) =

Alan Black (15 January 1943 – 5 March 2007) was known as one of the presenters of BBC's Sounds of the Seventies.

After having worked as a disc jockey for a series of commercial radio stations in the mid-1960s, Black joined the BBC in July 1968, with a programme on BBC Radio 1: Midday Spin. He also presented In Concert, on BBC Radio 1, the What's New programme and Radio 1's Sounds of the Seventies, with Anne Nightingale.
