= Ian Donaldson =

Scottish singer

- Origin: Govan, Glasgow, Scotland
- Genres: Pop; new wave; electronic; synth-pop; punk rock
- Occupations: Singer; songwriter; composer; record producer; writer
- Instrument: Vocals
- Years active: 1978–present
- Labels: Spock; RCA; Legend; World@Love; Toy Town

Ian Donaldson is a Scottish singer and writer.

Donaldson's music career spans more than 40 years. He came to prominence in the early 1980s as co-founder and lead singer of new wave band H_{2}O, which released two UK Top 40 hits in 1983 with the singles "I Dream to Sleep" and "Just Outside of Heaven". After the band's break-up, he pursued a solo career and played in a band called FourGoodMen.

Donaldson released his debut novel, A Rainbow in the Basement, in 2016.

In 2018, he released his debut solo studio album, From Stars We Came on Toy Town Records. Two sold-out concerts in Glasgow commemorated his official return to the music industry.

== Early life ==
Donaldson grew up in Govan, Glasgow, and showed early interest in music. He studied Art & Design in Glasgow, and by age 16 he was singing in the band 8 Miles Out.

== Career ==
Trying to stand out from other bands in the area, Donaldson formed the punk band Skroo with Alan McGee, where he also performed as lead singer. The band performed its first gig from the back of a lorry at the Campaign for Nuclear Disarmament (CND) Rally in Elder Park, and went on to be a local success, playing gigs at the Mars Bar in Glasgow. The band signed a recording contract and played on the TV music show Top of the Pops.

After Donaldson left Skroo, he founded H_{2}O with Davie Wells (guitar), Colin Ferguson (bass), Ross Alcock (keyboards), Kenny Dorman (drums) and Colin Gavison (saxophone). In 1981, the band released its first single "Hollywood Dream". H_{2}O signed with RCA in 1983, and made the Top 20 UK charts with their single "I Dream to Sleep". The band released their sole studio album Faith in 1984. H_{2}O broke up in 1988 over creative differences, but reunited periodically for one-off gigs.

After H_{2}O disbanded, Donaldson went on to pursue a solo career. He also played in a band called FourGoodMen with Big Country's guitarist Bruce Watson, former Simple Minds bassist Derek Forbes and keyboardist Mick MacNeil. The group released an album in 2006 titled Heart of Winter: 2006 Tour Sampler.

In September 2016, Donaldson released a debut novel titled A Rainbow in the Basement.

In February 2018, Donaldson released his debut solo studio album, From Stars We Came. The album got an official launch at Websters Theatre in Glasgow, which saw two nights of concerts with a full band.

== Discography ==
=== With H_{2}O ===
Year	Album
1984	Faith

=== Solo ===
Studio album

Year	Album
2018	From Stars We Came

Singles

Year	Title	B-side
1987	"The Sun Ain't Gonna Shine Anymore"	"USA Son"
2016	"Angel Pale"	--
2017	"Ticker Tape Parade"	--

== Bibliography ==
- A Rainbow in the Basement (I Dream Books, 2016) ISBN 0995614709
