= Pete Drummond =

British disc jockey (born 1943)

- Born: Peter Drummond-Hay; 29 July 1943 (age 81); Bangor, Wales
- Occupation(s): Disc jockey voice artist
- Spouses: Carolyn Macdonald (m. 1966; div. 1972) Celia Humphris (m. 1972; div. 1995) Julie Margaret White (m. 2002)

Peter Drummond-Hay (born 29 July 1943), known professionally as Pete Drummond, is a British voice artist and former BBC and pirate radio disc jockey and announcer.

== Biography ==
=== Early years and pirate radio ===
He was born in Bangor, Wales. His parents were Geoffrey Francis Drummond-Hay and Margaret Felon, married in 1936. His father fought in the First World War.

As a child he lived in Australia and France, before attending Millfield School alongside later BBC Radio 1 colleague Tony Blackburn. He trained as an actor and toured the US, where he realised that, following the "British Invasion", English accents were in demand on radio stations. He worked as an announcer in Wichita and Topeka, Kansas, before returning to Britain in 1966. He then joined the staff of pirate station Radio London, where he had his own shows during the station's final months on air. His nickname was “Dum Dum” and the music he adopted as his theme tune was the 1966 track "Marble Breaks, Iron Bends" recorded on Fontana records by Peter Fenton. Each of his shows ended with a piece of advice: "Smile, it makes everyone else wonder what you've been up to." The station closed at 3pm on Monday 14 August 1967.

=== BBC Radio 1 years ===
He joined Radio 1 from its start in September 1967, and, as someone who was seen as both avant garde and reliable, was used as one of the early presenters of Top Gear, along with John Peel who later took over the programme. In 1977 the BBC chose him to present a series of 11 radio programmes, scripted by Pete Frame and John Tobler, called Summer of '67 which concentrated on the music and sounds that had made an impact ten years earlier. Between September 1978 and March 1981 he presented the BBC2 rock programme titled Rock Goes to College, which featured bands playing at university campuses.

Drummond continued presenting radio and occasionally TV programmes for the BBC until the early 1990s, often featuring progressive rock music on programmes such as Disco 2, Sounds of the Seventies and Sight and Sound In Concert (a BBC initiative to provide simultaneous pictures on BBC2 television and stereo radio broadcasts on BBC Radio 1, as stereo television broadcasts and receivers did not exist at the time).

He also worked for the BBC World Service and Radio Luxembourg. He left the BBC in 1991. On 11 July 1997 he attended, along with other DJs, the launch of the BBC documentary The Radio One Story, which commemorated the 30th anniversary of the radio station.

=== Voice-over experience ===
After leaving the BBC he became a leading voice-over performer in Britain, his voice often appearing in advertisements and film trailers. In 2004 he was the voice-over for the TV movie about Alexander the Great titled Charging for Alexander. On 29 April 2011 Drummond did the voice commentary for the Wedding of Prince William and Catherine Middleton on the live broadcast made by the Discovery Channel.

== Personal life ==
Drummond married Carolyn McDonald in 1966; they divorced in 1972. He married Celia Humphris (1950–2021), the singer with the Trees folk band, on 26 August 1972 at Kensington Register Office. They divorced in 1995; in later life Celia Drummond-Ford became an automated announcer on the British railway network. She died in France, aged 70, on 11 January 2021. Drummond married Julie Margaret White in 2002. His sister Alison Drummond-Hay was born in 1946 and died from leukaemia in France, aged 63, in 2009. He has two children, a daughter born 1966 from his first marriage, and a son born 1974 from his second marriage.
