= Talking with Strangers =

Studio album by Judy Dyble
- Released: August 2009
- Label: FiXiT/Brilliant/Gonzo Multimedia
- Producer: Tim Bowness, Alistair Murphy

Judy Dyble chronology
The Whorl (2006)	Talking with Strangers (2009)	Flow and Change (2013)

Alternate cover (second pressing)

Talking with Strangers is an album first issued in the UK in 2009, by Judy Dyble featuring various musicians including Robert Fripp, Ian McDonald, Julianne Regan, Simon Nicol, Tim Bowness, Jacqui McShee and Pat Mastelotto.

== Releases ==
The album was initially issued by Dyble's manager, Jon Sheller, credited on the inlay as 'Jon the m' on his own Brilliant/Fixit via Universal imprint, and has subsequently been re-issued twice on vinyl, with different artwork on both versions. In Scandinavia a CD version was issued by Termo. Dyble, Bowness and Murphy made promotional TV appearances and radio broadcasts.

Dyble made numerous radio appearances to promote the release and appeared on national Norwegian television and radio, including a live performance on God morgen Norge.

Additionally, Dark Peak productions released an imported version in Japan. Late 2012 saw a deal signed for the first official release of the album in the USA via Gonzo Multimedia. The release date being late February 2013.

The album features a near 20-minute biopic of Dyble's life ("Harpsong").

The UK release received reviews including being described as a "sophisticated triumph" and was selected as HMV stores 'recommended album of the year' 2009 in the specialist music sector.

The first UK pressing featured the artwork of 1960s psychedelic artist John Hurford and inner sleeve illustration by Koldo Barroso. This version is sold out and deleted as of December 2009. The second UK pressing (and subsequent releases feature the artwork and designs of Jackie Morris.

Upon the UK release, Dyble played a press and a headline show at the 100 club, this was the first time she had appeared on stage in London since the days of her being the lead singer of Fairport Convention and Trader Horne in the late 1960s. The band included Simon Nicol, Tim Bowness, Alistair Murphy and Rachel Hall from Big Big Train.

== Reception ==
David Kidman wrote a review in August 2009. Of "Harpsong" he writes "the experimental wyrd-folk of Trader Horne meets the nascent prog-rock of King Crimson head-on".

== Track listing ==
#	Title	Writer(s)	Guest musician(s)
1.	"Neverknowing"	(Tim Bowness, Alistair Murphy)	Dyble (voice) – Bowness (additional voice) – Simon Nicol (acoustic guitar)
2.	"Jazzbirds"	(Bowness, Judy Dyble, Murphy)	Dyble (voice + autoharp) – Bowness/McShee (additional voices) – Murphy (acoustic guitar, organ, keyboards)
3.	"C'est La Vie"	(Greg Lake, Pete Sinfield)	Dyble (voice) – Bowness, Regan, Humphris (additional voices) – Murphy (acoustic guitar, organ, keyboards) – Ian McDonald (flute) – Fletcher (bass) – Pat Mastelotto (drums and percussion).
4.	"Talking with Strangers"	(Dyble, Bowness, Murphy)	Dyble (voice) – Bowness (additional voice) – Murphy (piano and Dynatron)
5.	"(In the) Dreamtime"	(Dyble, John Gillies)	Dyble (voice + autoharp) – Bowness/McShee (additional voices) – Murphy (acoustic guitar, 12 string guitar, electric guitar, organ, piano, keyboards) – Gillies (acoustic guitar) – McDonald (alto flute) – Fletcher (bass) – Mastelotto (drums and percussion).
6.	"Grey October Day"	(Dyble, Bowness, Murphy)	Dyble/Bowness (voices) – Murphy (piano, organ, acoustic guitar) – A'Court (tenor + alto sax) – Fletcher (bass) – Mastelotto (drums and percussion)
7.	"Harpsong"	(Dyble, Bowness, Murphy)	Dyble (voice + autoharp) – Bowness (additional voice, electric guitar) – A'Court (tenor + alto sax) – Murphy (numerous instruments 10+) – Fletcher (H) (electric guitar) – Fletcher (bass) – Robert Fripp (guitar and soundscapes) – Rachel Hall (violin) – McShee, Regan, Humphris (additional voices) – Sanchia Pattinson (oboe) – Nicol (acoustic guitar) – McDonald (lead alto sax, flute, alto flute, ukulele) – Mastelotto (drums and percussion) – Paul Robinson (electric guitar)

== Release history ==
Label	Catalogue no.	Released	Region	Notes
FiXiT/Brilliant	FXTR CD113	10 August 2009	UK	1st issue, 'Hurford sleeve' First 1000 numbered, first 500 also signed
FiXiT/Brilliant	FXTRR CD113	Jan 2010	2nd UK	'Jackie Morris artwork'
Tonefloat	TF70	Sept 2009	Vinyl	500 pressed, with signed postcard
Termo	TermoCD006	25 Jan 2010	Scandinavian issue	revised artwork, bonus track 'Fragile'
Tonefloat	TF70	November 2012	Vinyl	reissue 500 only with Jackie Morris Artwork
Gonzo	HST123CD	February 2013	US/Canada issue	revised artwork, bonus tracks 'Waiting' 'Sparkling'
