= Chris Wade (writer) =

English-born writer

Chris Wade is an English born writer, musician and filmmaker. He has recorded some thirty albums as founder member of the acid-folk music project Dodson and Fogg, which has featured guest performers including Toyah Willcox, Nik Turner, Judy Dyble and Nigel Planer. Dodson and Fogg has had BBC airplay and received positive reviews. He also writes fiction and non-Fiction books. He worked with Rik Mayall on his Cutey and the Sofaguard audiobook, which Mayall narrated, and runs Scenes Magazine, a cult and classic film publication. Wade also makes documentaries, such as George Melly: The Certainty of Hazard and The Immortal Orson Welles, the latter which premiered on Talking Pictures TV. His art film, The Apple Picker, won Best Film at Sydney's World Film Festival in 2017 and featured singer and actress Toyah Willcox. Wade also wrote the book The Films of James Woods, for which he interviewed American actor James Woods, Sharon Stone and Oliver Stone, plus others. For Scenes Magazine, Hound Dawg, various books and documentaries, he has interviewed such people as Rik Mayall, Adrian Edmondson, Nigel Planer, Neil Innes, Carol Cleveland, Norman Eshley, Tim Brooke-Taylor, Donovan, Dave Davies of The Kinks, Michael Palin, Ian Anderson of Jethro Tull, Moe Tucker of The Velvet Underground, Stephen Frears, Debbie Harry, Stacy Keach, Sharon Stone, Bertrand Blier, Donald Sutherland, Harris Yulin, Roger McGough, Henry Jaglom, and many others.
