= Sounds of the 70s =

Radio programme

Sounds of the 70s is the name of a BBC radio programme, currently broadcast on Sundays on BBC Radio 2, with the Sounds of the Seventies name also having been used by BBC Television for a number of themed music compilations, now repeated on BBC Four.

== Sounds of the Seventies (BBC Radio 1) ==
The original Sounds of the Seventies was a Radio 1 programme broadcast on weekdays, initially 18:00–19:00, subsequently 22:00–00:00, on during the early 1970s. Among the DJs were Mike Harding, Alan Black, Pete Drummond, Annie Nightingale, John Peel (who alone had two shows per week), and Bob Harris (who started presenting the show on 19 August 1970 by playing Neil Young's "Cinnamon Girl"). For contractual reasons one of Peel's two weekly shows was known as Top Gear, but the format and content of the show on every weekday was in essence identical for most of the early 1970s.

Unlike most other Radio 1 programmes, Sounds of the Seventies concentrated on albums rather than singles, and rock music rather than pop. Sessions recorded exclusively by the BBC and featuring major musicians of the day were a regular feature; the Musicians' Union insisted that "needle time" — time given to playing recorded music — should be limited.

In 1974 the Thursday show was replaced by a show without DJs known as the Thursday Night Sequence. Album tracks were played without interruption or introduction, and Pete Drummond gave the artist's name, album name and track name after the piece. It had sound effects such as footsteps or a match lighting up just before the DJ spoke. The programme, also known as "The Sequence", was produced by John F. Muir, with his name in stereo, sounding John (left channel), F (left and right channel), Muir (right channel)

In early 1975 Sounds of the Seventies was dropped. In September of that year the loss of a nightly slot for progressive rock music was restored by the introduction of the nightly John Peel Show, which initially broadcast from 23:00 to 00:00. Peel carried on and expanded the practice of hosting exclusive sessions by major musicians. The Peel Show format lasted until Peel's death in 2004.

=== Theme tune ===
The theme tune for the programme was usually a George Martin piece known as "Theme One", played in baroque style on a church organ. It was the version by Van der Graaf Generator. Martin had written the piece some years earlier as a theme tune for Radio 1. Variations included Mike Harding's use of the central guitar solo from "Heartbreaker" by Led Zeppelin, and Alan Black's regular closing theme, which was the piano and voice coda from "Pilgrim's Progress" by Procol Harum.

== Sounds of the 70s (BBC Radio 2) ==
In 2000, another programme with the name Steve Harley: Sounds of the 70s, but unrelated to the original, began broadcasting on BBC Radio 2. Hosted by Steve Harley, the thirty-minute programme featured rock and pop tracks from the 1970s. In 2008, following several series, the show was dropped from the Radio 2 schedule for a year. The last programme was aired on 27 March 2008.

=== Johnnie Walker-era ===
A new series of Sounds of the 70s with Johnnie Walker began on Sunday 5 April 2009 with disc-jockey Johnnie Walker now hosting. It is broadcast on Radio 2 as part of the station's retro music output, which also includes Sounds of the 60s (which was formerly hosted by Brian Matthew, who was replaced in 2017 by Tony Blackburn). Sounds of the 70s is broadcast from 15:00-17:00. During Walker's time as host, the show had features such as Johnnie's Jukebox, which added an "essential" seven inch single each week to the list and which had 567 entries at the time of Walker's departure. Other features included One of a Kind and Better Than the Original.

On 10 January 2022, Bob Harris announced he was returning to the programme, after more than fifty years away, by sitting in for Walker on the episodes to be broadcast on 16 and 23 January.

On 6 October 2024, Walker announced he would retire from the show and broadcasting on 27 October 2024, with Walker also announcing that Bob Harris would become the permanent host from 3 November. On 4 June 2026, Harris announced that he would retire from broadcasting due to ill health. It was announced on the same day that Shaun Keaveny, who stood in for Harris during his cancer treatment, would take over the programme.

=== Other similar series (BBC Radio) ===
In addition to Sounds of the 70s and Sounds of the 60s, there is also Sounds of the 80s, which debuted in 2013, first hosted by Sara Cox, who was then replaced in 2018 by Gary Davies. It was first broadcast on Saturdays at 22:00, and is now broadcast at 20:00 on Saturdays, while the 22:00 to 00:00 slot was given over to Sounds of the 90s, which was launched in 2020, with Fearne Cotton hosting.

== Sounds of the Seventies (BBC Two/BBC Four) ==
As well as the radio programmes, BBC Television also made two series of shows under the title Sounds of the Seventies, which was broadcast originally by BBC2 in 1993 (with Sounds of the 70s 2 being made in 2012) and repeated by UKTV's Yesterday channel in the 2010s. The programmes are used regularly as schedule filler by BBC Four, with the programmes sometimes cut down to 10-15 minute runtime. Sounds of the Seventies compiled 1970s performances from the BBC's music archives, taken from programmes such as Top of the Pops and The Old Grey Whistle Test, with each programme compiled around a music genre or theme, such as the "Rock 'n' Roll Revisited" episode which featured acts whose sound owed a debt to the sounds of the late 1950s and the "Anarchy on the BBC" edition which featured punk acts. The series also used some short clips used to set the scene of the 1970s theme being used that week.

=== Series 2: Sounds of the 70s 2 (2012) ===
No. overall	No. in series	Title
9	1	"Arthouse Glam - Get in the Swing (The Kinks, Roxy Music, Elton John, New York Dolls, Queen, Sparks, Rod Stewart and David Bowie)"
10	2	"Reggae - Stir It Up (Ken Boothe, Steel Pulse, Janet Kay, Althea and Donna)"
11	3	"Troubadours – Peaceful Easy Feeling (Crosby and Nash, Neil Young, Joni Mitchell, James Taylor)"
12	4	"Guilty Pleasures - Love Will Keep Us Together (The Carpenters, Bread, Charles Aznavour, John Denver, 10cc, Bellamy Brothers, Exile, Captain and Tennille, and Dr Hook)"
13	5	"Rock - The Boys Are Back in Town (Alice Cooper, The Faces, Nazareth, Bad Company, AC/DC, Thin Lizzy and Black Sabbath)"
14	6	"Soul: Keep On Keeping On (Aretha Franklin, Billy Preston, Curtis Mayfield, Bill Withers, The Stylistics and Gil Scott-Heron)"
15	7	"Disco - Ain't No Stopping Us Now (The Jacksons, Sylvester, George McCrae, Sister Sledge, and McFadden and Whitehead)"
16	8	"Rock 'n' Roll Revisited - Get It On (Electric Light Orchestra, T-Rex, 10cc, Alvin Stardust, Mott the Hoople and Meatloaf)"
17	9	"Punk - Anarchy on the BBC (The Stranglers, the Damned, Sex Pistols, Buzzcocks)"
18	10	"New Wave - Hit Me with Your Rhythm Stick (Elvis Costello, the Police, Squeeze, Blondie)"

=== Other similar series (BBC Television) ===
Sounds of the Seventies followed on from Sounds of the Sixties which was first broadcast on BBC2 on 5 October 1991, with an episode called "The First Steps" which featured performances from acts such as The Beatles, Gerry and the Pacemakers and The Rolling Stones, along with puppets Pinky & Perky doing the Twist. Due to the nature of the BBC's 1960s Top of the Pops archive, the series compiled each episode from a wide range of BBC programmes such as cutting-edge pop show The Beat Room and children's programmes like Blue Peter and Crackerjack, with some short clips used to set the scene of the 1960s theme being used that week.

On 12 January 1996, an eight-part series called Sounds of the Eighties was first shown by BBC2, with the first episode featuring Duran Duran, Culture Club, ABC, Bananarama and Kylie Minogue. Both the 1960s and 1980s series have been repeated many times on BBC Four, with the programmes also being used by UKTV's Yesterday channel as part of their Saturday night music programming block. In the late 2010s, Sounds of the 80s with Gary Davies had an hour long video version of the show simulcast by BBC Radio 2 and BBC Television (via the Red Button on Freeview channel 601), with pop stars from the 1990s and early 2000s (like Louise and Dido) picking their favourite 1980s hits.

== See also ==
- Sounds of the Sixties
