= Trader Horne (band) =

British musical group

- Origin: England
- Genres: Folk, British folk rock
- Years active: 1969–1970
- Label: Pye Records
- Past members: Judy Dyble; Jackie McAuley; Hugh Thomas; Ian Gumblefinger
- Website: http://www.myspace.com/traderhorne

Trader Horne was a British duo, consisting of multi-instrumentalist and former Them keyboard player and vocalist Jackie McAuley, and former Fairport Convention lead vocalist Judy Dyble. The short-lived musical partnership broke up after releasing only one LP, Morning Way, in 1970. The band was named after DJ John Peel's nanny, Florence Horne, nicknamed "Trader" in reference to explorer Trader Horn.

== History ==
=== Formation ===
McAuley, born John McAuley to a musical family (14 December 1946, in Coleraine, County Londonderry, Northern Ireland), came to London in 1963 where he met up with Gene Vincent and joined his brother Pat as keyboard player with Them from January to April 1965. McAuley left and moved to Dublin where he joined The Kult with Paul Brady from about April to December 1965. He then rejoined his brother in The Belfast Gypsies, with whom he recorded two singles and one album before their split in November 1966.

After her stint with Fairport Convention, Dyble (and her then-boyfriend Ian McDonald) joined pop band Giles, Giles and Fripp, and contributed to demo recordings, but she left after her relationship with McDonald ended. Giles, Giles and Fripp - retaining McDonald - would later evolve into King Crimson. After moving to Fulham in early 1969, Dyble befriended the members of the band Steamhammer. Her roommate started a romantic relationship with the band's guitarist, Martin Quittenton and the three of them moved to Notting Hill Gate. Quittenton was recording and writing with Rod Stewart and working with Pete Sears, whom Quittenton had known from Steamhammer days) amongst others, on Stewart's solo albums, Gasoline Alley and Every Picture Tells A Story. Sears was sharing a flat with Jackie McAuley and they, together with Dyble, rehearsed a number of songs and were planning to perform as a trio, but Sears decided to go to the US to join Silver Metre (with Leigh Stephens), then Stoneground, Copperhead, Jefferson Starship and Hot Tuna, leaving Dyble and McAuley to continue as a duo.

=== Breakthrough ===
Steamhammer's manager, Barry Taylor, got the band to perform in small venues until they were found by Barry Murray, Pye Record's producer for their new psychedelic subsidiary label, Dawn. Red Bus Company was in charge of the management. The band started touring, and shared stages with acts such as Humble Pie, Yes, and Genesis.

=== On the Road ===
In Dyble's own words:

Trader Horne set off on the road. And what a road it was. We seemed to be careering from one side of the country to another, then up and down with not a lot of breaks in between. I seem to remember being really tired and as for Jack – well he was doing a lot of the driving as well as playing. At one time we were appearing on a lot of those local TV magazine shows, the ones that followed the six o’clock news. We did travel to Belfast, it was in the middle of the dreadful times there. It looked forlorn in the rain with all the barbed wire. But the welcome at the TV station was warming.

One nice memory of Trader Horne: appearing on a Grampian TV music programme along with Cat Stevens amongst others. The flight back from Aberdeen was delayed by fog, so Jack and I listened to ‘Tea for the Tillerman’ being virtually written in front of our ears, and singing along with it. That was magical.

The album Morning Way was recorded and Brian Patten wrote the sleeve notes. The songs are knitted together with short instrumentals, celeste and flute on one side and piano on the other. A single called "Sheena" was released. Its B-side was a Dyble-written song called "Morning Way". The songs were a departure from the music either had performed or written before. The duo recruited Hugh Thomas on guitar and Ian Gumblefinger on bass to tour the album. Another single was released shortly after the LP's release: "Here Comes The Rain" / "Goodbye Mercy Kelly".

=== Breakup ===
A music festival was organized to launch the band: the Hollywood Music Festival in Newcastle-under-Lyme. Shortly before the performance, in May 1970, Judy Dyble decided to leave the band. Instead, a band called Mungo Jerry was launched. Trader Horne briefly continued after Judy's departure; she was replaced by Saffron Summerfield.

== Aftermath ==
Shortly after, Jackie McAuley decided to pursue a solo career, to form The Poor Mouth, and to work as a valued session musician and as Lonnie Donegan's musical director and sideman. He is still recording and playing.

Judy Dyble went on to marry DJ and lyricist Simon Stable and joined a short-lived band called Dyble, Coxhill & the Miller Brothers. She retired from music in 1973. She returned to music and performed at Fairport Convention's Cropredy Festival in the 'Anniversary' years of 1997, 2002 and 2007 and pursued a solo recording career.

Over the years the Morning Way album has acquired mythical status. The band's singles are now highly collectable. Trader Horne was featured in Kingsley Abbott's book 500 Lost Gems of the 60s. To coincide with this, Stuart Maconie made a one-hour biopic radio special on Dyble's career for his BBC 6 Music programme "Freak Zone", as well as a significant piece in Record Collector.

Jackie and Judy agreed to reunite as Trader Horne for a one-off show on 29 November 2015 at Bush Hall in London, to celebrate 45 years since Morning Way was first released. They played solo spots, then the whole of the album, but not in the original track order. Positive reviews included a 5 star review in The Times. They also appeared at the 2016 Green Man Festival.

== Discography ==
Year	Album
1970	Morning Way
