= Bias Boshell =

British singer (born 1950)

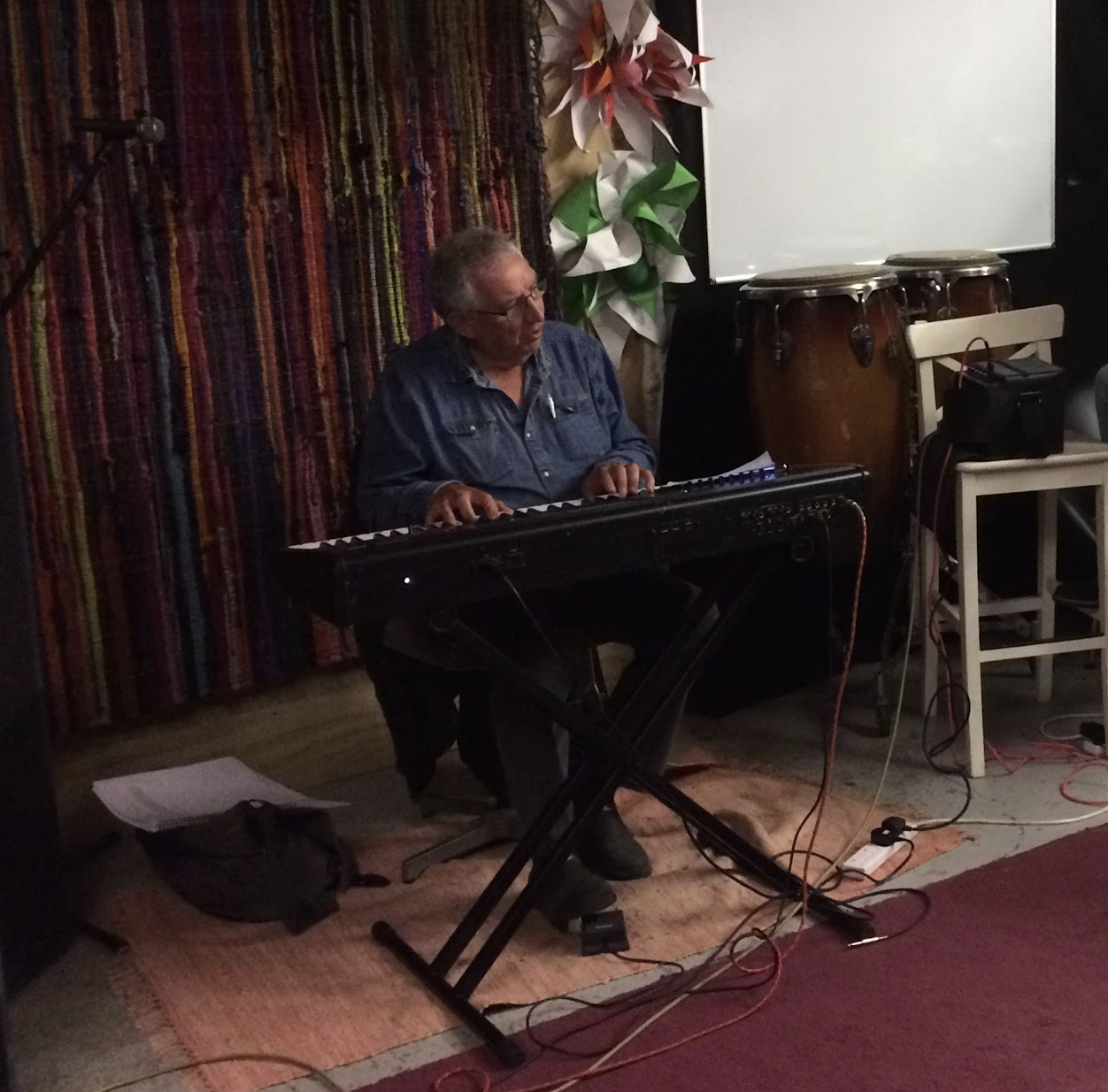
- Boshell in 2018

Background information
- Born: Tobias Boshell; 20 July 1950 (age 75); Wye, Kent, England
- Genres: Folk rock
- Occupation(s): Musician, songwriter
- Instruments: Vocals; keyboards; guitar; piano; bass
- Years active: 1969–present
- Labels: Columbia
- Website: www.bjharvest.co.uk

Tobias Boshell (born 20 July 1950) is an English songwriter and musician, best known as the founder of the folk rock band Trees.

He was born in Wye, Kent, was educated at Bedales and the Royal College of Music. Boshell formed Trees in 1969 with Celia Humphris on vocals, Barry Clarke on lead guitar, Unwin Brown on drums/vocals, and David Costa on acoustic guitar & dulcimer. Bias sang and played bass, guitar and piano on their two CBS albums, The Garden of Jane Delawney (1970) and On the Shore (1971), and wrote much of their material. On the Shore was remastered in January 2007 and re released on CD.

After the original group broke up in the early 1970s, Boshell worked with Kiki Dee, writing her hit songs "I've Got the Music in Me" and "First Thing in the Morning," among others.

In the 1980s, Boshell became a guest musician for Barclay James Harvest, touring and recording with them. In 1987 he moved on to The Moody Blues, becoming their lead keyboard player after the departure of Patrick Moraz in 1991. He stayed with the Moody Blues until their 2001 tour. He has also recorded with Sheena Easton, Kevin Ayers, Beverley Craven, Chris Farlowe, and Duane Eddy.
