= Judy Dyble =

British singer (1949–2020)

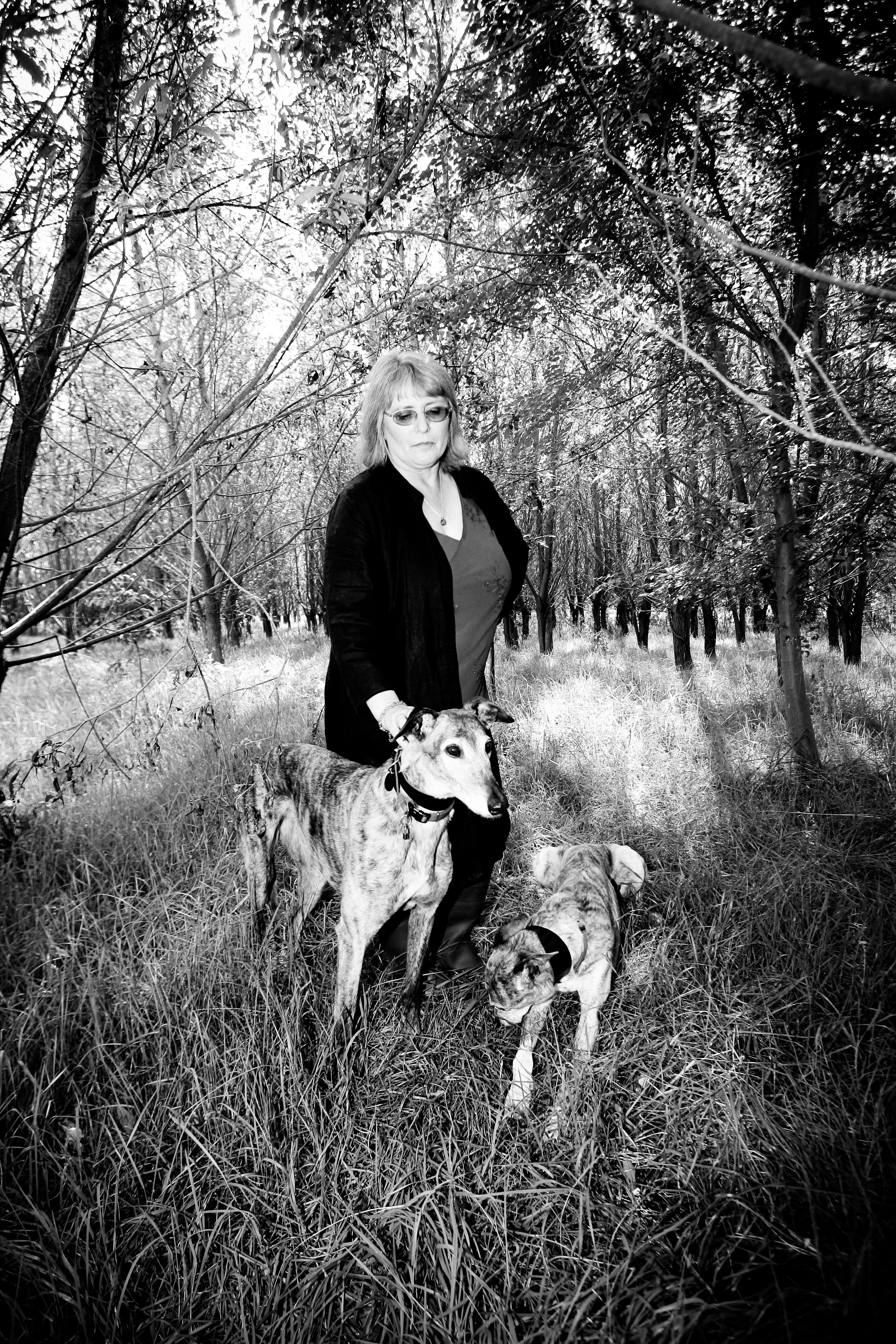
- Dyble in Oxfordshire, 2009

Background information
- Born: Judith Aileen Dyble; 13 February 1949; London, England
- Died: 12 July 2020 (aged 71) Oxfordshire, England
- Occupations: Musician; singer; songwriter
- Instruments: Vocals; autoharp; piano; recorder
- Years active: 1960s–2020
- Formerly of: Fairport Convention; Giles, Giles and Fripp; Trader Horne
- Website: www.judydyble.com

Judith Aileen Dyble (Note: /daɪˈbəl/ DIE-bull) (13 February 1949 – 12 July 2020) was an English musician, most notable for being a vocalist and a founding member of Fairport Convention and Trader Horne. In addition, she and Ian McDonald joined and recorded several tracks with Giles, Giles and Fripp, who later became King Crimson. These tracks surfaced on the Brondesbury Tapes CD and Metaphormosis vinyl LP.

== Early years ==
Dyble was born on 13 September 1949, at the Middlesex Hospital, central London. Her first band was Judy and The Folkmen (which existed between 1964 and 1966). They made homemade demo recordings, none of which were released, but some are included on a mooted anthology of Dyble's career. (Sanctuary Records set a release date in 2007 for this, but the release was cancelled when Sanctuary was taken over by Universal.) She then became the original vocalist with Fairport Convention from 1967 to 1968.

In November 1966 Ashley 'Tyger' Hutchings asked her to sing and play with Richard Thompson, Simon Nicol, and himself. This became the nucleus of Fairport Convention, initially with Shaun Frater as a drummer and later Martin Lamble. The group recorded their first album with her, their repertoire at the time consisting of American singer-songwriter works, plus originals. The first single was a cover of a 1930s American song, "If I Had a Ribbon Bow". The band covered and re-worked numerous American recordings with the band members choosing some tracks to work with from manager Joe Boyd's record collection. The band also picked up on the works of Joni Mitchell before she was known in the UK, and covered two of her songs on their first album, Fairport Convention.

Fairport's early live shows in London in the late 1960s saw Dyble share stages with acts such as Jimi Hendrix, and Syd Barrett-era Pink Floyd. Famously, she sat on the front of the stage at the Speakeasy Club knitting, while Hendrix and Richard Thompson jammed. Dyble guested on The Incredible String Band's 1968 album The Hangman's Beautiful Daughter (on "The Minotaur's Song"), and on G. F. Fitz-Gerald's 1970 album Mouseproof (on "Ashes of an Empire"). Writing on her own website, of her departure from the band, Dyble later said she had been "unceremoniously dumped".

After her stint with Fairport Convention, Dyble (along with her then-boyfriend Ian McDonald) joined the English pop band Giles, Giles and Fripp by advertising in Melody Maker. Dyble contributed to demo recordings for the group, but left after her relationship with McDonald ended. Giles, Giles, and Fripp – retaining McDonald – would later evolve into the foundation progressive rock band King Crimson.

Dyble would go on to become one half of the duo Trader Horne, with ex-Them member Jackie McAuley. Pete Sears was originally the third member of the band, but flew to the United States before recording began. The group took its name from John Peel's nanny Florence, called "Trader" Horne—a reference to explorer Trader Horn. The duo signed to Dawn (a subsidiary of Pye Records) releasing one album, Morning Way, in 1969, and two highly prized, collectible vinyl singles. Dyble wrote the title track, "Morning Way", and co-wrote "Velvet to Atone" with Martin Quittenton for the album. The pairing shared stages with acts such as Humble Pie, Yes, and Genesis. They split a few days before they were due to headline the Hollywood festival in Newcastle-under-Lyme that saw Mungo Jerry first come to public attention. In 2008, Trader Horne was featured in Kingsley Abbott's book, 500 Lost Gems of the 60s; to coincide with this, Stuart Maconie did a one-hour biopic radio special on Dyble's career on his BBC6 radio programme the Freak Zone, as well as a piece in Record Collector.

She also worked with Lol Coxhill, Phil Miller and his brother Steve in a group called DC & the MBs (Dyble, Coxhill and the Miller Brothers) or Penguin Dust.

In 1973, Dyble left the music business to work with her husband, DJ and scenester Simon Stable (who had played bongos on albums by Bridget St John and Ten Years After under his real name, Count Simon de la Bédoyère). Later on, Dyble (by now a mother) worked as a librarian.

At the 1981 Fairport Convention Annual Reunion (held that year at Broughton Castle), Dyble appeared on stage as a surprise guest: backed by Fairport's Full House lineup, she sang Joni Mitchell's "Both Sides, Now" and the Everly Brothers' "When Will I Be Loved". She also appeared as a guest in 1982 (A Week-End in The Country), 1997 (30th anniversary), 2002 (35th anniversary) and 2007 (40th anniversary).

== 2000s ==
For a long time, the only Dyble recordings available in the retail trade had been the first Fairport Convention album but Morning Way was reissued on CD in November 2000. In 2003, almost a decade after the death of Stable, Dyble began writing and performing again. She released the first of several new works – Enchanted Garden – in 2004, followed by Spindle and The Whorl in 2006. The last two albums received only limited releases with little if any distribution. Occasional live appearances saw her appear at Cropredy (alongside what was virtually the original Fairport line up) in 2007.

Dyble released a single on 3 March 2008 with northern indie/folk band The Conspirators through independent label Transcend Media Group. It was a double A-side featuring Dyble's vocals on a remake of Fairport Convention's song "One Sure Thing" and The Conspirators song "Take Me To Your Leader". It reached No.7 in the official UK Indie Singles Chart, spending 3 weeks in the top 10. The promotion for this single saw Dyble make a couple of rare live appearances, at the Harrogate International Conference Centre, and at an in-store live gig at HMV's superstore in Leeds city centre on 3 March 2008.

Her next album, Talking with Strangers, was recorded throughout 2008 with Tim Bowness (No-Man) and Alistair Murphy co-writing and producing. Collaborators include Robert Fripp, Simon Nicol, Pat Mastelotto, Ian McDonald, Julianne Regan, Celia Humphris, Jacqui McShee, Laurie A'Court and Mark Fletcher. During work on the album, she played a rare outdoor show at the Llama festival in North Devon, in June 2008.

Dyble took her place at the head of Fairport Convention's initial line up, at Witchseason's 40th anniversary celebration show at the Barbican Theatre on 18 July 2009, for the first time in nearly 40 years, excluding very brief occasional outings at Cropredy. Talking With Strangers was released in August 2009 becoming the recommended choice on the bbc.co.uk homepage, and receiving favourable reviews from, among others, the Mail on Sunday, Record Collector, Shindig!, R2 (Rock'n'Reel), and All About Jazz, and was described as a "sophisticated triumph" on the BBC music website. A number of radio stations aired the near 20-minute track "Harpsong" in full, and Dyble undertook a run of BBC local radio interviews, including BBC Radio Oxford, Solent, Suffolk, Devon, Cornwall, Lancashire, and Manchester.

In May 2009, early review copies of the new album with Robert Fripp were sent out. Dyble's Myspace showed samplers of some of the album tracks, and directly from her, and from Tim Bowness's Burning Shed, signed numbered early release copies sold out very quickly. 27 August 2009 saw an intimate gig by Dyble at the 100 Club in London, supported by Tim Bowness, Alistair Murphy, and Simon Nicol, her first solo gig in London in over 40 years. Dutch label Tonefloat released a vinyl version of the album in 2010, and Dyble added additional vocals to the 2 November 2009 single release "Every Sentimental Moment" by UK rock band Kings Cross. Termo records in Norway announced a Scandinavian release in February 2010, with revised artwork by noted artist and children's illustrator Jackie Morris, and a bonus track from the album sessions "Fragile". This release was supported by promotional television appearances in Norway, notably on the breakfast show God morgen, Norge!. Two tracks were performed live, "Jazzbirds", and "Grey October Day". Dyble, Bowness, and Murphy also recorded an as yet unseen clip for the programme Lydverket.

Harpsong won the award for Best Original Song voted for by the online community Talkawhile in January 2010, and the album featured in the Best of 2009 lists in Classic Rock magazine by noted writers Jo Kendall, and Sid Smith. The album was also promoted by UK music store HMV as one of its best specialist sector albums.

In December 2009, producer/arranger Lee Fletcher announced via online networks that he and touch guitarist Markus Reuter would be collaborating (along with a number of other musicians including Robert Fripp) with Dyble on new work. The project was subsequently revealed by Dyble to be titled Newborn Creatures and as of 11 February 2011 the album was said to be complete. Mastering duties were undertaken by Simon Heyworth, who produced, mixed and mastered Tubular Bells as well as mastering work by Nick Drake, Simple Minds and others. Subsequent to this announcement, Dyble announced via her own website that the project had run into difficulties and would not be released in the form she had intended, and that she had been removed from the project altogether.

She stated:

I am very sorry to have to say seemingly my album, Newborn Creatures will now not be released in its current incarnation. Lee Fletcher and Markus Reuter have decided to remove my songwords and my vocals and artwork and anything to do with me from the recording. I do not know what they intend to do with what is left, but they have stated that they intend to release my album without me in some form and at some point in the future.

== Last work ==
She completed an album with Alistair Murphy, titled Flow and Change, which was released by Gonzo Multimedia on 1 July 2013. Mostly co-written with Murphy, who also engineered and produced the album, others are co-written with Julianne Regan, Simon House and Dean Frances-Hawksley/Andy Suttie. Guest collaborators were Matt Malley (ex Counting Crows) Mike Mooney (Spiritualized), Julianne Regan (All About Eve) and Pat Mastelotto (King Crimson).

During 2013, Dyble collaborated with Oliver Kersbergen of Sleepyard in co-writing three songs, one of which "Blue Barracuda" was released on the Füxa album Dirty D in August 2013 and two more, "Rainy Day Vibration" and "Satellite Calling" were released on Sleepyard's album Black Sails, on USA label Global Recording Artists in January 2014. She sang "1000 Year Vacation (reprise)" on the same album. Having completed a 3CD anthology of, in most cases, the lesser known music she has been involved with over the last 50 years, Gathering the Threads (Fifty Years of Stuff), was released in March 2015.

In October 2015, Earth Recordings re-released the Trader Horne album Morning Way on sunset red vinyl and CD in time for the Trader Horne reunion concert at Bush Hall in London on 29 November 2015. In November 2015, Earth recordings released the first part of the Gathering the Threads Anthology as Anthology Part One on vinyl and CD.

In November 2015, Dyble and Jackie McAuley re-united as Trader Horne to perform the whole of the Morning Way album live at Bush Hall in London. They were accompanied by Jackie's brother Brendan McAuley and members of Dyble's own Band of Perfect Strangers—Alistair Murphy, Mark Fletcher, Phil Toms and Ian Burrage with Steve Bingham.

Dyble spent most of 2015 and the early part of 2016 writing her autobiography with the assistance of Dave Thompson. An Accidental Musician was published in April 2016 by Soundcheck Books. During 2016–17, Dyble concentrated on finishing a new album of her work—Summer Dancing — with various collaborators, and a new collection of songs recorded with Andy Lewis which was released in August 2017. She recorded a duet with David Longdon on "The Ivy Gate" with Big Big Train for the album Grimspound, which was released in April 2017.

Dyble performed at Fairport's Cropredy Convention Festival with her own Band of Perfect Strangers; and she also appeared with the surviving original members of Fairport Convention, celebrating the 50th Anniversary of the formation of the band in 2017. The songs sung by the "early years" line-up were "Time Will Show The Wiser", "I Don't Know Where I Stand" and "Reno Nevada". All three songs were often performed in the first year of the band's live performances in 1967–68.

In 2018, she released the album Earth is Sleeping on Acid Jazz Records whose final track was titled "Newborn Creatures"; it is not clear how this album related to the aborted 2009 album. It featured collaborations with The Fierce and the Dead's Matt Stevens and King Crimson's Pat Mastelotto.

A new album in collaboration with David Longdon, Between A Breath and a Breath, containing seven new songs with lyrics written by Dyble and music by Longdon, was released in September 2020.

Dyble died on 12 July 2020, at the age of 71, in Oxfordshire. She had lung cancer in the years leading up to her death, and revealed the diagnosis in November 2019 when she began chemotherapy.

== Discography ==
=== Singles ===
A-side	B-side	Artist	Label	Catalogue no.	Released	Region	Chart/Notes
"If I Had a Ribbon Bow"	"If (Stomp)"	Fairport Convention	Track	604 020	February 1968	UK	
"Sheena"	"Morning Way"	Trader Horne	Pye	7N17846	November 1969	UK	
"Here Comes the Rain"	"Goodbye Mercy Kelly"	Trader Horne	Dawn	DNS1003	February 1970	UK	
"One Sure Thing" "Take Me To Your Leader"	"Connected" "Robots" (CD only)	Judy Dyble with the Conspirators	Transcend	TR178CD; TR178V	March 2008	UK	No. 7 Official Indie chart, 1000 vinyl, First 50 numbered + signed
"Every Sentimental Moment"	"Lone"	Kings Cross with Judy Dyble	Brilliant/FiXiT	FXTR V111	November 2009	UK	500 numbered clear Vinyl / Download only
Fragile EP	Sparkling/Waiting	Judy Dyble	Brilliant	BMV1011	December 2010	UK	500 numbered picture discs / download

=== Albums ===
Title	Artist	Label	Catalogue no.	Released	Region	Notes
Fairport Convention	Fairport Convention	Polydor	583 035	June 1968	UK	
Morning Way	Trader Horne	Dawn	DNLS 3004	March 1970	UK	
Morning Way	Trader Horne	Janus	JLS3012		USA	
Enchanted Garden	Judy Dyble	Talking Elephant	TECD 068	September 2004	UK	
Spindle	Judy Dyble	Talking Elephant	TECD 084	February 2006	UK	
The Whorl	Judy Dyble	Talking Elephant	TECD 094	July 2006	UK	
Talking with Strangers	Judy Dyble	FiXiT/Brilliant	FXTRCD 113	August 2009	UK	First 1000 numbered, first 500 of these signed
Talking With Strangers – Limited vinyl	Judy Dyble	Tonefloat	TF70	September 2009	Europe	500 only, with signed postcard
Talking With Strangers	Judy Dyble	Termo	CD006	March 2010	Scandinavia	Exclusive bonus track 'Fragile'
Talking With Strangers – Reissue vinyl	Judy Dyble	Tonefloat	TF70	November 2012	Europe	500 only, with Jackie Morrisa/w
Talking With Strangers	Judy Dyble	Gonzo	HST123CD	February 2013	USA/Can	Exclusive bonus tracks 'Waiting' 'Sparkling'
Flow and Change	Judy Dyble	Gonzo	HST 150CD	July 2013	World	
Flow and Change – Limited Vinyl	Judy Dyble	Plane Groovy	PLG025	March 2014	World	
Live at WMJazz	Judy Dyble	Cromerzone	CZ00019	July 2014	World	
Gathering The Threads-Fifty Years of Stuff – Limited 3-CD set	Judy Dyble	Starcrazy	SC001-SC002-SC003	March 2015	World	450 (250 numbered and signed)
Morning Way 500 copies Limited deluxe edition w/7" single	Trader Horne	Flashback	FBLP1001	October 2014	World	
Morning Way Limited edition Red vinyl + CD	Trader Horne	Earth Recordings	EarthLP006	October 2015	World	
Anthology Part One Limited edition vinyl + CD	Judy Dyble	Earth Recordings	EarthLP008	November 2015	World	
Songs in Waiting Limited edition sampler EP	Judy Dyble	Starcrazy	SC004	July 2017	World	
Summer Dancing CD + Vinyl	Judy Dyble & Andy Lewis	Acid Jazz/[PIAS]	AJXCD 416	August 2017	World	
Earth Is Sleeping CD + Vinyl	Judy Dyble	Acid Jazz	AJXCD 447	July 2018	World	
Weavings of a Silver Magic (Live at St Barnabas Church Cambridge) CD	Judy Dyble	Cromerzone	CZ00022	April 2020	World	
Between a Breath and a Breath CD	Dyble Longdon	English Electric Recordings	EERCD0026	2020	World	

=== Compilations and guest appearances ===
Title	Artist	Tracks	Label	Catalogue no.	Released	Region
BackTrack Two	(various artists)	"If I Had a Ribbon Bow"	Track	2407 002	May 1970	UK
A Young Person's Guide to King Crimson	King Crimson	"I Talk to the Wind"	Island	ISLP7	1976	UK
(guitar, vocal)	Richard Thompson	"Time Will Show the Wiser"	Island		May 1976	
Moat on the Ledge	Fairport Convention	"Both Sides Now"	Woodworm	WR 001	1982	UK
The Guv'nor Vol.4	Ashley Hutchings	"Both Sides Now"	No label	HTD CD 66	1996	UK
The Guv'nor presentation 4 (cd wallet)	Ashley Hutchings	"Both Sides Now"	No label	HTD BOX1	1996	UK
Ashley Hutchings 5	Ashley Hutchings	"If I Had a Ribbon Bow"	No label	TECD 037	2002	UK
Burning Bright	Ashley Hutchings	"One Sure Thing"	Free Reed	FRQCD 50	2005	UK
The Fairport Companion	(various artists)	"Morning Way" (Trader Horne) "Velvet to Atone" (Trader Horne)	Castle Music	CMDDD 1337	10 April 2006	UK
Live at the BBC	Fairport Convention	(Disc 4, tracks 1–8, see below)	Island	984 5385	April 2007	UK
Dirty D	Fuxa	"Blue Barracuda"	Rocketgirl Records	rgirl97	August 2013	UK
Thee Faction	Songs To Remind The Class of the Glorious Victory To Come and the Work That Must Be Done To Get There	"Relentless"	Soviet Beret	EP-CD SOV05	December 2013	World
Black Sails	Sleepyard	"Rainy Day Vibration" / "Satellite Calling" / "1000 Year Vacation" (Reprise)	Global Recording Artists	GRA 13442	March 2014	US
The Honey Pot	Ascending Scales	"Sitting All Alone"	Fruits De Meur (Regal Craboniophone)	winkle 25	October 2016	World
The Roadmap in Your Head	Spirits Burning & Clearlight	"The Roadmap in Your Head"	Gonzo Multimedia	HST 423 CD	November 2016	World
Grimspound	Big Big Train	"The Ivy Gate"	English Electric Recordings	EERCD 0019CD/GEPCD 1054	April 2017	World
Another Roadmap in Your Heart	Spirits Burning & Daevid Allen	"The Roadmap in Your Heart"	Gonzo Multimedia	HST 463 SIN	April 2017	World
Thankful Villages Vol.2	Darren Hayman	"Upper Slaughter"	Caught by the River	Rivertones 9	May 2017	
Green Leaves	Judy Dyble and Andy Lewis	"Northern Sky"	Mojo Magazine Covermount CD		March 2018	World
What We Did on Our Saturday	Fairport Convention	"Time Will Show the Wiser"; "Reno Nevada"; "Meet on the Ledge"	Matty Grooves	MG2CD 055	May 2018	
Sleepyard	Winter Crickets	"Blue Barracuda"	Global Recording Artists	GRA	June 2018	US
Sand Snowman	Seven Sisters, Seven Seas - LP Viny	"Sunset (Tired of Waiting)" / "The Tides"	Tonefloat Records	TFLP182A	July 2018	World
A Tree With Roots – Fairport Convention and the Songs of Bob Dylan	Fairport Convention	"Jack O'Diamonds"; "Lay Down Your Weary Tune"	Island	675 893-1	3 August 2018	

Note: the eight tracks included on Live at the BBC were recorded for John Peel's Top Gear programme. Four – Let's Get Together, One Sure Thing, Lay Down Your Weary Tune and Chelsea Morning – date from the period prior to Ian Matthews joining Fairport, and were broadcast 10 December 1967; the other four – Violets of Dawn, If (Stomp), Time Will Show the Wiser and If I Had a Ribbon Bow – were broadcast 3 March 1968, a week after the release of the debut single. All eight come from "off air" recordings, not original BBC tapes.
