= Tony Cox (music producer) =

British record producer and arranger

- Genres: Progressive rock
- Occupations: Musician; record producer; composer; arranger
- Instruments: Piano; synthesizer
- Years active: 1966–present
- Known for: Sawmills Studios

Tony Cox is a British record producer and arranger. As such he was influential in late 1960s and 1970s folk rock developments and the fledgling progressive rock scene, and has since worked primarily as a composer and orchestrator.

== Career ==
Cox entered the music business as a performer in 1966, and as a duo with Douglas MacRae-Brown, released The Young Idea LP in 1967. He had a UK top-ten hit single with a cover version of the Lennon–McCartney song "With a Little Help from My Friends". (The album was re-issued on CD in 2009 with previously unreleased tracks.) He continued performing in the studio with various acts he produced, such as Trees and Mick Softley. He was an early adopter of the EMS VCS 3 synthesizer, and in 1971, played on the Spirogyra album St. Radigunds and Mike Heron's album Smiling Men With Bad Reputations. In 1972, he played piano with The Bunch alongside Sandy Denny on vocals, and in 1976, he played synth on Martin Carthy's Crown of Horn LP.

In 1974, he founded Sawmills Studios in Cornwall, one of the first residential recording studios in the UK.

In 1978, he married the singer-songwriter Lesley Duncan and produced her single "The Magic's Fine". In 1979, he produced and arranged the charity single "Sing Children Sing" for the International Year of the Child. In 1982, he produced Duncan's cover version of Bob Dylan's single "Masters of War". They moved to the Isle of Mull, Scotland, in 1996.

From 1988 to 1990, he worked for Andrew Lloyd Webber's Really Useful Group as music supervisor, overseeing various shows.

Recently, Cox has been composing for instrumental ensembles, utilizing unusual modal scales and unorthodox harmonies (which he has named "Pleiomodalism") and mixing rigid compositional rules with John Cage–like chance elements.

== Credits ==
=== Producer ===
- Caravan
- Mick Softley (arranger)
- Tír na nÓg
- Magna Carta (arranger)
- Trees (arranger)
- Françoise Hardy (arranger)
- Mick Greenwood (arranger)
- Amory Kane

=== Arranger and orchestrator ===
- Family
- Yes
- Renaissance
- John and Beverley Martyn
