= Robin Hobb bibliography =

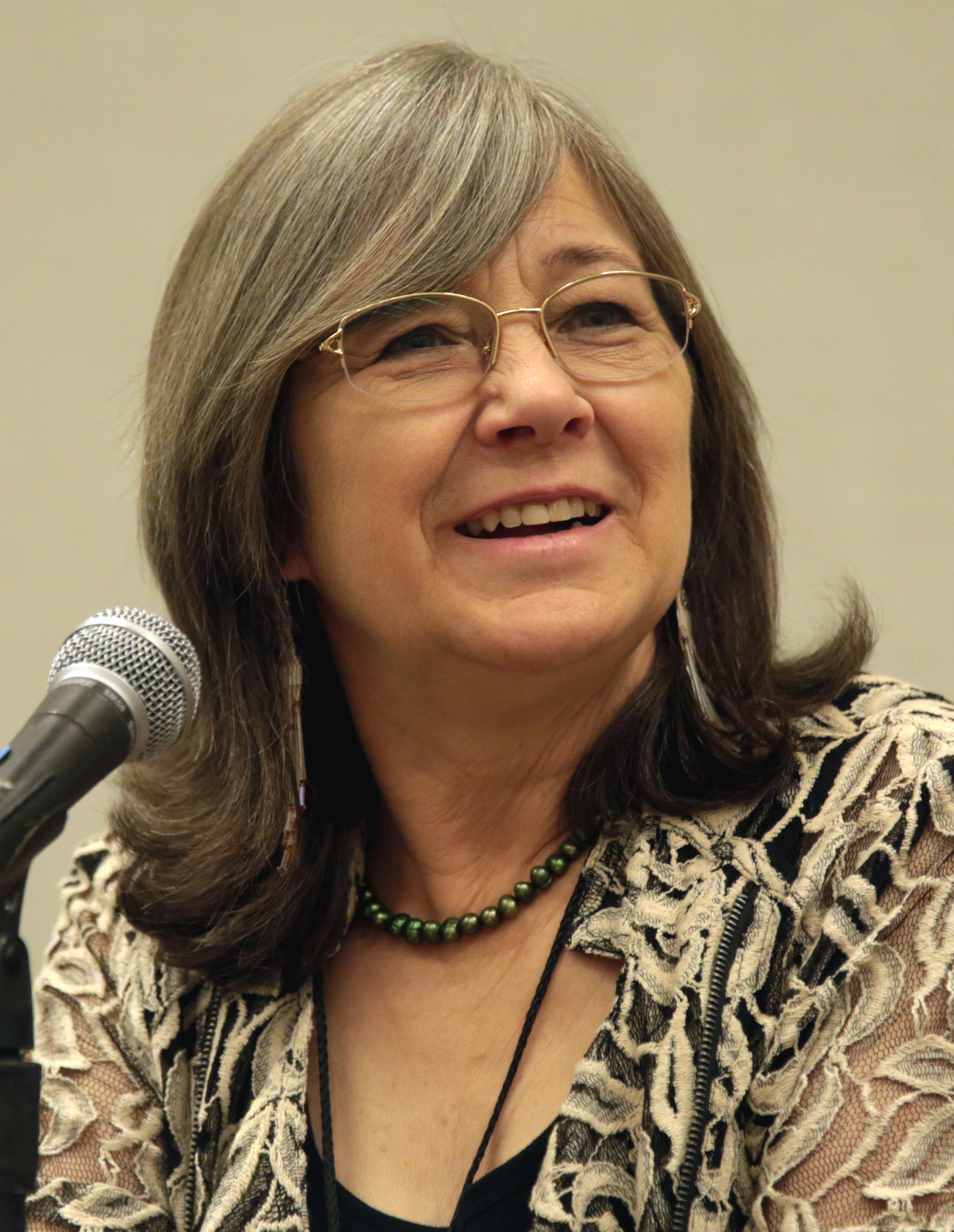
Hobb in 2017

This is a complete list of works by American author Robin Hobb, the pen name of Margaret Astrid Lindholm Ogden, who also writes under the pen name Megan Lindholm.

== Writing as Megan Lindholm ==
=== Novels (Lindholm) ===
Novels by Megan Lindholm
Series	Title	Year	Publisher	Ref.
Windsingers	Harpy's Flight	1983	Ace	
Windsingers	The Windsingers	1984	Ace	
Windsingers	The Limbreth Gate	1984	Ace	
Windsingers	Luck of the Wheels	1989	Ace	
Reindeer People	The Reindeer People	1988	Ace	
Reindeer People	Wolf's Brother	1988	Ace	
Standalone novels	Wizard of the Pigeons	1986	Ace	
Standalone novels	Cloven Hooves	1991	Bantam	
Standalone novels	Alien Earth	1992	Bantam	
Standalone novels	The Gypsy (with Steven Brust)	1992	Tor	

=== Short fiction (Lindholm) ===
Short fiction by Megan Lindholm
Type	Title	Date	Published in/by	Notes	Ref.
Individual stories	"Koko's Day Out"	Mar 1977	Humpty Dumpty's Magazine, no. 246	(Note: Written under the name M. Lindholm)	
Individual stories	"Bones for Dulath"	1979	Amazons!	(Note: The first work published under the Megan Lindholm pseudonym. Features the protagonists of the Windsingers series. Edited by Jessica Amanda Salmonson; winner of the 1980 World Fantasy Award for Best Anthology)	
Individual stories	"The Small One"	Oct 1980	Fantastic Science Fiction, vol. 27, no. 11		
Individual stories	"The Poaching"	1981	Finding the Boundaries	(Note: Appeared under the name M. Lindholm in Finding the Boundaries, an anthology of poems and short stories that had won statewide literary contests in Alaska; published by the Alaska State Council on the Arts in 1981. The council awarded Lindholm a grant for her story.)	
Individual stories	"The Beholder"	Jan 1981	Space and Time, no. 58		
Individual stories	"Shadow Box"	Apr 1981	Space and Time, no. 59		
Individual stories	"Faunsdown Cottage"	Winter 1981	Space and Time, no. 61		
Individual stories	"Superior Graphics"	Winter 1983	Space and Time, no. 65		
Individual stories	"A Coincidence of Birth"	1985	Liavek	(Note: Edited by Will Shetterly and Emma Bull)	
Individual stories	"Pot Luck"	1986	Liavek: The Players of Luck		
Individual stories	"An Act of Mercy"	1987	Liavek: Wizard's Row	(Note: Written with Steven Brust; edited by Will Shetterly and Emma Bull)	
Individual stories	"An Act of Love"	1988	Liavek: Spells of Binding	(Note: Written with Steven Brust and Gregory Frost; edited by Will Shetterly and Emma Bull)	
Individual stories	"The Unicorn in the Maze"	1988	The Unicorn Treasury	(Note: Edited by Bruce Coville)	
Individual stories	"Silver Lady and the Fortyish Man"	Jan 1989	Asimov's Science Fiction, vol. 13, no. 1	(Note: Nebula Award finalist. Reprinted in The Inheritance)	
Individual stories	"A Touch of Lavender"	Nov 1989	Asimov's Science Fiction, vol. 13, no. 11	(Note: Hugo and Nebula Award finalist and Asimov's Readers Award winner. Reprinted in The Inheritance)	
Individual stories	"The Fifth Squashed Cat"	1994	Xanadu II	(Note: Edited by Jane Yolen. Reprinted in The Inheritance)	
Individual stories	"Strays"	1998	Warrior Princesses	(Note: Edited by Elizabeth Ann Scarborough and Martin H. Greenberg. Reprinted in The Inheritance)	
Individual stories	"Cut"	May 2001	Asimov's Science Fiction, vol. 25, no. 5	(Note: Nebula Award finalist. Reprinted in The Inheritance)	
Individual stories	"Grace Notes"	2005	The Fair Folk	(Note: Edited by Marvin Kaye; winner of the 2006 World Fantasy Award for Best Anthology)	
Individual stories	"Drum Machine"	2011	The Inheritance	(Note: A collection of 7 stories by Megan Lindholm and 3 stories by Robin Hobb. Originally titled The Inheritance; later editions switched to the title The Inheritance & Other Stories: By Lindholm: A Touch of Lavender, "Silver Lady and the Fortyish Man", "Cut", "The Fifth Squashed Cat", "Strays", "Finis", "Drum Machine"; By Hobb: "Homecoming", "The Inheritance", "Cat's Meat" (set in the Realm of the Elderlings))	
Individual stories	"Finis"	2011	The Inheritance		
Individual stories	"Old Paint"	Jul 2012	Asimov Science Fiction, vol. 36, no. 7		
Individual stories	"Neighbors"	2013	Dangerous Women	(Note: Edited by George R.R. Martin and Gardner Dozois. Reprinted in The Inheritance)	
Individual stories	"Community Service"	2018	The Book of Magic	(Note: Edited by Gardner Dozois)	
Individual stories	"Second Chances"	2019	Unfettered III	(Note: Edited by Shawn Speakman)	
Individual stories	"Generations"	Jul 2020	Asimov's Science Fiction, vol. 44, no. 7		
Individual stories	"Giving Up the Ghost"	Jul 2021	Asimov's Science Fiction, vol. 45, no. 7		
Individual stories	"A Dime"	Nov 2021	F&SF, vol. 141, no. 5		
Collections	The Inheritance	2011	Voyager		

== Writing as Robin Hobb ==
=== Novels (Hobb) ===
Novels by Robin Hobb
Series	Sub-series	Title	Year	Publisher (1st ed.)	Notes	Ref.
Realm of the Elderlings	Farseer trilogy	Assassin's Apprentice	1995	Bantam	(Note: The first work published under the Robin Hobb pseudonym. Written under the working title Chivalry's Bastard)	
Realm of the Elderlings	Farseer trilogy	Royal Assassin	1996	Voyager		
Realm of the Elderlings	Farseer trilogy	Assassin's Quest	1997	Voyager		
Realm of the Elderlings	Liveship Traders	Ship of Magic	1998	Bantam, Voyager		
Realm of the Elderlings	Liveship Traders	The Mad Ship	1999	Voyager	(Note: Titled The Mad Ship in the UK and Mad Ship in the US)	
Realm of the Elderlings	Liveship Traders	Ship of Destiny	2000	Voyager		
Realm of the Elderlings	Tawny Man trilogy	Fool's Errand	2001	Voyager		
Realm of the Elderlings	Tawny Man trilogy	The Golden Fool	2002	Voyager	(Note: Titled The Golden Fool in the UK and Golden Fool in the US)	
Realm of the Elderlings	Tawny Man trilogy	Fool's Fate	2003	Voyager		
Realm of the Elderlings	Rain Wild Chronicles	Dragon Keeper	2009	Voyager	(Note: Titled The Dragon Keeper in the first UK edition and Dragon Keeper in later editions. The series is also known as the Rain Wilds Chronicles.)	
Realm of the Elderlings	Rain Wild Chronicles	Dragon Haven	2010	Voyager	(Note: The series is also known as the Rain Wilds Chronicles.)	
Realm of the Elderlings	Rain Wild Chronicles	City of Dragons	2012	Voyager		
Realm of the Elderlings	Rain Wild Chronicles	Blood of Dragons	2013	Voyager		
Realm of the Elderlings	Fitz and the Fool trilogy	Fool's Assassin	2014	Del Rey, Voyager		
Realm of the Elderlings	Fitz and the Fool trilogy	Fool's Quest	2015	Del Rey		
Realm of the Elderlings	Fitz and the Fool trilogy	Assassin's Fate	2017	Voyager		
Soldier Son trilogy	Soldier Son trilogy	Shaman's Crossing	2005	Voyager		
Soldier Son trilogy	Soldier Son trilogy	Forest Mage	2006	Voyager		
Soldier Son trilogy	Soldier Son trilogy	Renegade's Magic	2007	Voyager		

=== Short fiction (Hobb) ===
Short fiction by Robin Hobb
Type	Series	Title	Date	Published in/by	Notes	Ref.
Individual stories	Realm of the Elderlings	"The Inheritance"	2000	Voyager 5: Collector's Edition	(Note: Reprinted in The Inheritance)	
Individual stories	Realm of the Elderlings	"Homecoming"	2003	Legends II	(Note: Edited by Robert Silverberg. Reprinted in The Inheritance)	
Individual stories	Realm of the Elderlings	"Words Like Coins"	2009	A Fantasy Medley	(Note: Edited by Yanni Kuznia)	
Individual stories	Realm of the Elderlings	"Blue Boots"	2010	Songs of Love and Death		
Individual stories	Realm of the Elderlings	"Cat's Meat"	2011	The Inheritance		
Individual stories	Realm of the Elderlings	The Willful Princess and the Piebald Prince	2013	Subterranean		
Individual stories	Realm of the Elderlings	"Her Father's Sword"	2017	The Book of Swords		
Individual stories	—	"The Triumph"	2010	Warriors		
Collections	—	The Inheritance	2011	Voyager		

=== Nonfiction (Hobb) ===
Non-fiction by Robin Hobb
Title	Date	Published in	Notes	Ref.
"A Bar and a Quest"	2001	Meditations on Middle-Earth	(Note: Edited by Karen Haber)	
"Fantasy and Clichés"	Jun 2002	Deep Magic, no. 1		
"What Joe Lansdale Means to Me"	2020	Fishing for Dinosaurs and Other Stories		

== Works cited ==
- Blaschke, Jayme Lynn (2005). Voices of Vision: Creators of Science Fiction and Fantasy Speak. University of Nebraska Press. ISBN 978-0-8032-6239-3.
- Brown, Charles N.; Contento, William G. (1999). The Locus Index to Science Fiction: 1984–1998. Locus.
- Brown, Charles N.; Contento, William G. (2001). The Locus Index to Science Fiction: 2000. Locus.
- Brown, Charles N.; Contento, William G. (2002). The Locus Index to Science Fiction: 2001. Locus.
- Brown, Charles N.; Contento, William G. (2003). The Locus Index to Science Fiction: 2002. Locus.
- Brown, Charles N.; Contento, William G. (2004). The Locus Index to Science Fiction: 2003. Locus.
- Brown, Charles N.; Contento, William G. (2006). The Locus Index to Science Fiction: 2005. Locus.
- Brown, Charles N.; Contento, William G. (2007). The Locus Index to Science Fiction: 2006. Locus.
- Brown, Charles N.; Contento, William G. (2008). The Locus Index to Science Fiction: 2007. Locus.
- Contento, William G. (2015). Index to Science Fiction Anthologies and Collections. Locus.
- Contento, William G. (2022). Stephensen-Payne, Phil (ed.). The FictionMags Index. Galactic Central.
- Crane, Ralph; Fletcher, Lisa (2017). Island Genres, Genre Islands: Conceptualisation and Representation in Popular Fiction. Rowman & Littlefield International. ISBN 978-1-78348-207-8.
- Holliday, Liz; Morgan, Chris (1996). "Lindholm, Megan". In Pringle, David (ed.). St. James Guide to Fantasy Writers. St. James Press. ISBN 978-1-55862-205-0.
- Miller, Stephen T.; Contento, William G. (2022). Stephensen-Payne, Phil (ed.). The Science Fiction, Fantasy, & Weird Fiction Magazine Index. Locus and Galactic Central.
- Storm, Sue (1996). "The Windsinger Series". In Shippey, T. A. (ed.). Magill's Guide to Science Fiction and Fantasy Literature. Salem Press. ISBN 978-0-89356-907-5.
