= Fitz and the Fool trilogy =

Trilogy of fantasy novels by Robin Hobb

- UK edition
- Fool's Assassin; Fool's Quest; Assassin's Fate
- Author: Robin Hobb
- Cover artist: Alejandro Colucci, Jackie Morris, Stephen Raw
- Country: United Kingdom, United States
- Language: English
- Genre: Fantasy
- Publisher: Del Rey (US), Voyager (UK)
- Published: 2014–2017
- Preceded by: Rain Wild Chronicles

The Fitz and the Fool trilogy is the concluding subseries of the Realm of the Elderlings, a 16-book fantasy series by American author Robin Hobb. Published from 2014 to 2017, it features the protagonist FitzChivalry Farseer in his fifties, and follows his life with his wife Molly and daughter Bee Farseer. It was well-received by critics, with the Los Angeles Review of Books praising Hobb's characterization and portrayal of aging, and The Guardian positively viewing how the final book consolidated plot threads from across the series.

== Background ==
The core idea for Hobb's 16-book Realm of the Elderlings series was "What if magic were addictive? And what if the addiction was destructive or degenerative?". Published over a span of 22 years, the series is divided into five parts: the Farseer trilogy, the Liveship Traders trilogy, the Tawny Man trilogy, the Rain Wild Chronicles, and finally the Fitz and the Fool trilogy. In the concluding trilogy, Hobb said that the birth of the character Bee was motivated by her interest in biological magic: "What if something happens when people live alongside dragons for a long time?” What if there is an exchange of genetic material? What [happens if] an ordinary human [is] in long-term contact with a white [prophet], with the Fool?"

Fool's Assassin, the first book of Fitz and the Fool, was released simultaneously in the US and the UK on August 12, 2014. Fool's Quest followed a year later, on August 11 in the US and August 13 in the UK. The series concluded in 2017 with the release of Assassin's Fate, on May 4 in the UK and May 7 in the US. The UK editions were published by Harper Voyager and illustrated by Jackie Morris and Stephen Raw; the US publisher was Del Rey and the cover artist was Alejandro Colucci.

== Plot ==
The trilogy follows Fitz in his fifties, and is told alternately from the point of view of Fitz and his daughter Bee Farseer.

== Themes ==
Scholars see queer themes in Hobb's portrayal of the Fool, a character who alternately presents as masculine and feminine in different segments of the Elderlings series, and in Fitz's possession of the Wit, a form of magic seen by society as an unnatural inclination. The dynamic between Fitz and the Fool, described in the series as "two halves of a whole, sundered and come together again" when they connect via the Skill, has romantic overtones, and critic Amanda Craig sees Fitz as "half in love with his friend". While positively viewing how Hobb's work blurs gender boundaries, Lenise Prater criticizes Hobb's emphasis on "monogamous, romantic love" in the Rain Wild Chronicles, seeing that series as a conservative representation of queer relationships. Peter Melville disagrees, viewing the concluding image of Fitz and the Fool trilogy as "confirm[ing] the series' place within the larger history of queerness in the fantasy genre".

Mariah Larsson views the series as ecocentric in nature, questioning the intrinsic value of human over other forms of life. The re-emergence of dragons in the series poses a challenge to anthropocentrism, or the supremacy of man's place in the world, with humans forced to re-adjust in relation to a stronger, more intelligent predator. The Wit, an ill-regarded ability associated with the animal world, is shown through Fitz's perspective as a natural extension of the senses and as an interconnectedness to all living things.

== Reception ==
Fantasy reviewer Justin Landon found Fool's Assassin slower-paced than the prior Elderlings books, writing on Tor.com that it was closer to a "pastoral family drama" than an epic fantasy. He also felt that it was highly successful, calling Hobb "an absolute master of the craft" and stating that "her prose sparkles, her characters leap off the page." Critic Jane Shilling agreed, comparing the book to a literary novel and terming it "high art" in her review for The Telegraph. She wrote of Hobb's characters that "their longings and failings are our own, and we find our view of the world indelibly changed by their experiences", and went on to describe the series as transcending the fantasy genre. The Los Angeles Review of Books praised Hobb's portrayal of aging, writing that traumas experienced in childhood "linger and take on new shapes" as her protagonist aged. The review felt that the complexity of Hobb's characters, along with the layered interactions between them, were central to her appeal, stating "it is watching Fitz struggle to bridge those spaces, struggle with those layers, that is more captivating than any magic."

Critic Amanda Craig, reviewing Fool's Quest for The Independent, felt that Hobb's writing had a Shakespearean flavor. She found the mood "nothing like as bleak as George R R Martin’s, nor as Manichean as Tolkien’s, but close to Ursula Le Guin’s redemptive humanism". While wishing for more action in the plot, she described Hobb's focus on characters as compelling and said the book "had me waking at 6 am" to keep reading. The Guardian's book reviewer Alison Flood praised how Assassin's Fate, the final novel, consolidated plot threads from across the 16-book series. She described the book as both "exciting and deeply introspective", and "a breathtaking conclusion".

== Works cited ==
- Larsson, Mariah (2021). "Bringing Dragons Back into the World: Dismantling the Anthropocene in Robin Hobb's The Realm of the Elderlings". In Höglund, Anna; Trenter, Cecilia (eds.). The Enduring Fantastic: Essays on Imagination and Western Culture. McFarland & Company. ISBN 978-1-4766-8012-5.
- Melville, Peter (2018). "Queerness and Homophobia in Robin Hobb's Farseer Trilogies". Extrapolation. 59 (3): 281–303. doi:10.3828/extr.2018.17. ProQuest 2156322163.
- Prater, Lenise (2016). "Queering Magic: Robin Hobb and Fantasy Literature's Radical Potential". In Roberts, Jude; MacCallum-Stewart, Esther (eds.). Gender and Sexuality in Contemporary Popular Fantasy. Routledge. doi:10.4324/9781315583938. ISBN 978-1-317-13054-3.
