= Wizard of the Pigeons =

Book by Margaret Lindholm

- First edition cover
- Author: Megan Lindholm
- Cover artist: Robert Gould
- Language: English
- Genre: Urban fantasy
- Publisher: Ace Books
- Publication date: 28 January 1986
- Publication place: United States
- Pages: 214
- ISBN: 0-441-89467-4
- OCLC: 14054439

Wizard of the Pigeons is a 1986 fantasy novel set in Seattle by Megan Lindholm, and a forerunner of the urban fantasy genre. It was the first work to draw wider attention to Lindholm (who also writes as Robin Hobb). The novel explores themes of homelessness, poverty, and mental illness. It was issued as a paperback original by Ace Books in 1986, and was reprinted in hardcover by Hypatia Press in 1994 and as a 35th Anniversary Edition (illustrated by Tommy Arnold) by Grim Oak Press in 2020. Several UK editions have also been published.

== Plot ==
The plot focuses on the homeless character Wizard and his battle with a malignant force from his forgotten past. In order to survive, Wizard must rely on his powerful gift of 'Knowing'. This allows him to know the truth of things, to receive fortunes and to reveal to people the answers to their troubles. Aiding him in his battle for survival is the enigmatic Cassie and several other people from the streets.

== Style ==
Scholar Farah Mendlesohn describes Wizard of the Pigeons as liminal fantasy that pairs "plain descriptions of the fantastic [...] with baroque descriptions of the real". The novel has been cited as a forerunner of the urban fantasy genre, with author Jo Walton stating: "here are people who aren’t reaching back to Tolkien or to British and European folklore, they are doing something new, they are writing American fantasy!". Literary allusions to the Arthurian legend have been also identified in the story, with the title character identified with Merlin Ambrosius.

== Reception ==
Wizard of the Pigeons was the first work to draw wider attention to Megan Lindholm. Author Orson Scott Card praised the novel as "miraculously good" and "so real, so original", but faulted Lindholm's use of "a vague, amorphous fog-like Evil Force" as the primary antagonist. In 1987, critic David Langford considered it to be "based on a cunning insight" and "(f)resh, original, (and) exciting." Sixteen years later, after the author began writing as Robin Hobb, publishers in France were interested in her Lindholm backlist and a translation titled Le Dernier Magicien was released. In 2004, Le Monde described it as "a work of undeniable originality and great poetic strength".

The setting of the novel has received praise from critics. Scholar Alexei Kondratiev, writing for Mythlore in 1986, argued that Lindholm's portrayal of Seattle was "depict[ed] with the same eye for mythopoeic detail that Saunders Ann Laubenthal brought to her evocation of Mobile in Excalibur". Stating that the novel was very different from Lindholm's earlier Ki/Vandien tales, Kondratiev said it "singled her out as a writer to watch" and "showed the scope of her talent". Academic Brian Attebery viewed the setting of the novel as sharing the aesthetic of works by Peter S. Beagle, Emma Bull and Nancy Willard, and suggested that it had "a particular concreteness that [...] provided firm ground and vivid detail to the narratives".

Writing in 2010, Jo Walton lauded the book as "glitteringly brilliant" with "a genuine fairytale feel and genuine fairytale logic while being both totally original and firmly grounded in the reality of Seattle", but observed that it "falls down a bit when it's trying to have a plot". She also noted that the book's opening "no longer seems so charmingly, astonishingly odd as it did [when she first read it] in 1987", and emphasized her own discomfort with "glamourizing the homeless and making their lives and problems magical". In a different view, the themes in the novel were described by scholar Stefan Ekman as challenging and subverting stereotypes of homelessness.

The book was featured in Bloomsbury's guide to the 100 best fantasy novels, where it was regarded as "a key work in the development of the urban fantasy subgenre", with praise for Lindholm's "original, stylish narrative". The 2003 French edition was awarded the Prix Imaginales for best fantasy novel.

== Sources ==
- Attebery, Brian (1992). Strategies of Fantasy. Indiana University Press. ISBN 978-0-253-31070-5.
- Carroll, Siobhan (2012). "Imagined Nation: Place and National Identity in Neil Gaiman's American Gods". Extrapolation. 53 (3): 307–326. doi:10.3828/extr.2012.17. ProQuest 1346869196.
- Ekman, Stefan (2005). "Down, Out and Invisible in London and Seattle". Foundation. 34 (94): 64–74. urn:nbn:se:kau:diva-86315.
- Howey, Ann F.; Reimer, Stephen Ray (2006). A Bibliography of Modern Arthuriana, 1500-2000. Boydell & Brewer. ISBN 978-1-84384-068-8.
- Kondratiev, Alexei (1986). "Tales Newly Told". Mythlore. 12 (4): 30–31. JSTOR 26812997.
- Lupack, Barbara Tepa (2002). "King Arthur and Vietnam". In Sklar, Elizabeth S.; Hoffman, Donald L. (eds.). King Arthur in Popular Culture. McFarland Publishers. ISBN 978-0-7864-1257-0.
- Mendlesohn, Farah (2013). Rhetorics of Fantasy. Wesleyan University Press. ISBN 978-0-8195-7391-9.
- Rennison, Nick; Andrews, Stephen E. (2009). 100 Must-Read Fantasy Novels. Bloomsbury. ISBN 978-1-4081-3607-2.
