= Renegade's Magic =

2007 novel by Robin Hobb

- First edition (UK)
- Author: Robin Hobb
- Cover artist: John Howe (UK)
- Language: English
- Series: Soldier Son Trilogy
- Genre: Fantasy
- Publisher: Voyager Books (UK)
- Publication date: 2 July 2007 (UK); 2 July 2007 (Australia); September 2007 (USA)
- Publication place: United States
- Media type: Print (hardback & paperback)
- Pages: 620 (hardback edition)
- ISBN: 0-00-719618-0 (UK hardback edition)
- OCLC: 85828631
- Preceded by: Forest Mage

Renegade's Magic is a fantasy novel by American writer Robin Hobb, the third in her Soldier Son Trilogy. The book follows Nevare, protagonist from the previous two novels, Forest Mage and Shaman's Crossing. Forced to hang for his alleged nefarious crimes, Nevare finally embraces the magic within himself and escapes. The battle between his Gernian and Speck identities is a central feature of the novel, highlighting themes such as loss of identity, and the impact of colonialism on native populations.

== Plot ==
The story begins with Nevare Burvelle scheduled for execution. However, Burvelle has been framed, and manages to escape with the help of his former lover, Lisana. The Gernia people (Nevare's ethnic peoples) plan to cut down a forest full of Elder Trees, which house the spirits of the ancestors of the Speck people. Soldier's Boy, a Speck spirit, inhabits Nevare's body and takes full control. Much of the novel is told from Nevare's perspective trapped behind this larger personality. Nevare embarks on his attempt to undermine the effort to build the road, often horrified by what his alter ego is doing with his body, even though he is powerless to stop it. The Specks and Gernia come to a peaceful solution at novel's end, with Nevare ultimately accepting his abilities and personality.

== Themes ==
The novel features themes of colonialism and its impact on native people (the Specks vs. Gernians), the struggle of identity that one faces (specifically, Soldier Boy and Nevare battling for one body), spiritualism (protecting the ancestors), and technological advance (the link between the use of magic and weight gain representing technological advance).

== Critical reception ==
The novel has received mixed to positive reviews. SFSite praised Hobb's usage of fantasy conventions to explore weighty concepts such as identity and fellowship, rights and duties, and permanence and change, noting that her writing is unique in a genre overpopulated with adolescent epics. Publishers Weekly called it a stunning conclusion to the series but criticized the confusing magical system and glacial pacing of the story.

== Taxonomy ==
Renegade's Magic details the story of Nevare Burvelle, a boy with magical powers. His world is also filled with other people who have a degree of magical prowess, and the world surrounding them generally regards the use of magic or possession of the ability as the "norm". The novel can therefore be defined generally as an immersive fantasy novel (in which magic is an inherent part of the world), as opposed to (for example) a portal quest novel, in which one enters a world of magic through a portal of some form. (The classic example being The Lion, The Witch, and the Wardrobe)
