= Windsingers series =

Fantasy series by Megan Lindholm

Windsingers
- 1985 omnibus of the first three books
- Harpy's Flight; The Windsingers; The Limbreth Gate; Luck of the Wheels
- Author: Robin Hobb as Megan Lindholm
- Illustrator: Kinuko Y. Craft, Richard Hescox
- Country: United States, United Kingdom
- Language: English
- Genre: Fantasy
- Publisher: Ace Books, Corgi Books
- Published: 1983–1989

The Windsingers is the debut fantasy series of American author Robin Hobb under her pen name Megan Lindholm, published between 1983 and 1989. It follows a woman named Ki as she recovers from the death of her family and forms a companionship with a man called Vandien. Over the course of four books, the duo face fictional creatures including harpies, who can grant visions of the dead, and Windsingers, beings who can control the weather through music. The characters Ki and Vandien first appeared in a short story in Amazons!, an anthology focused on female heroes in fantasy. The anthology won a World Fantasy Award in 1980, and Lindholm's story drew the interest of an editor at Ace Books, leading to the development of the series.

Critics regard Ki and Vandien as a man and woman portrayed as equals, in both the series and the preceding short story. Through their companionship, Ki comes to terms with her grief at the loss of her family. Lindholm's characterization of Ki and Vandien received praise, as did as her worldbuilding. A 1996 reference work said the protagonists had a warm and human dynamic that made the story "come alive". While some reviewers found the Windsingers a promising debut, others described it as a conventional fantasy that lacked the creativity of Lindholm's later writings. Sales of the first book made it a midlist title, according to Lindholm, and it did not earn back its author's advance.

== Background ==
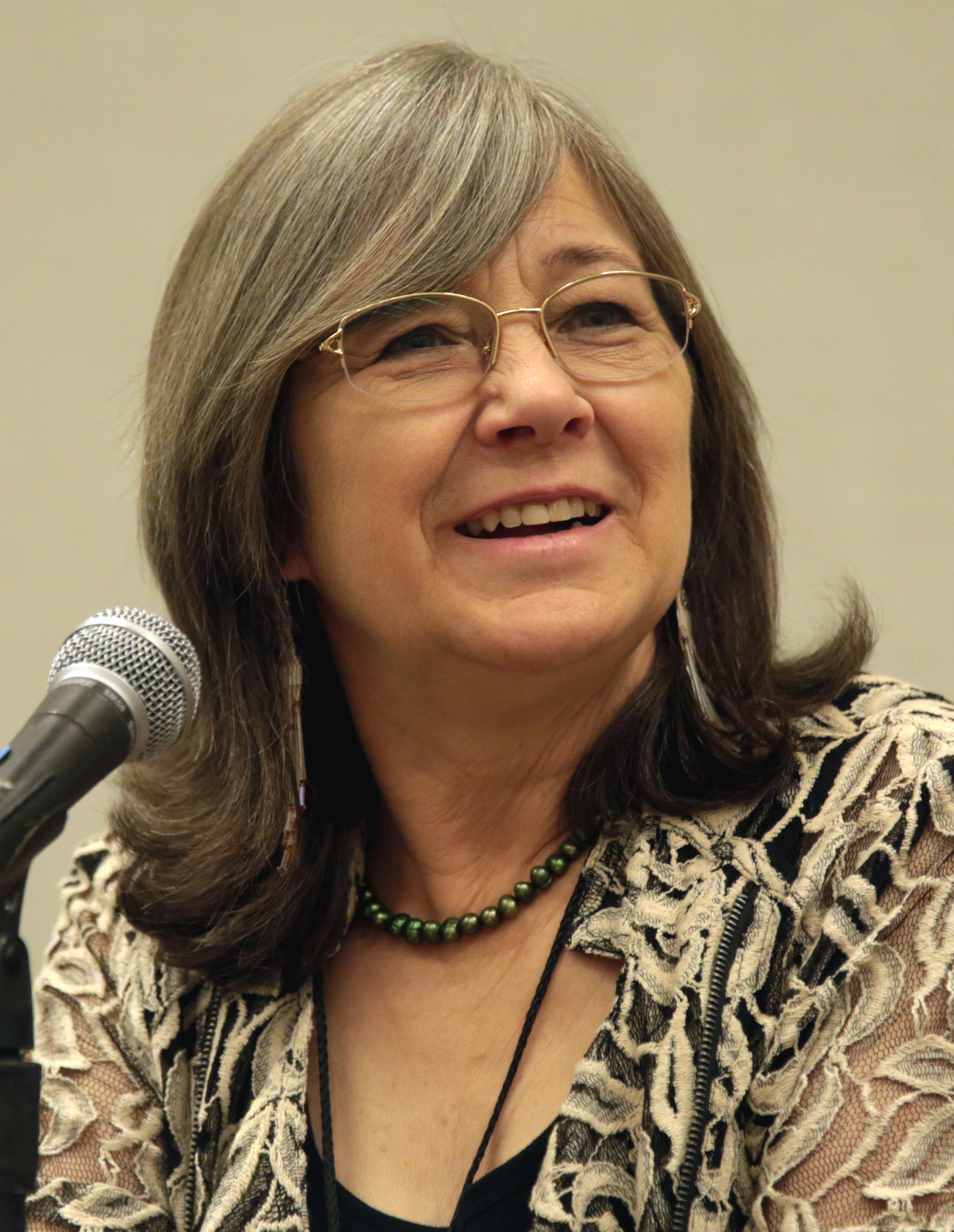
Lindholm in 2017

In 1979, editor Jessica Amanda Salmonson sought to highlight female protagonists in heroic fantasy, a genre that was male-dominated at the time, through an anthology of short stories titled Amazons!. While the book focused on women warriors who were independent of men, Salmonson wanted to include in it an example of male–female friendship. For this theme, she selected the story "Bones for Dulath" by Margaret Astrid Lindholm Ogden, an American author who wrote as M. Lindholm. Feeling that women writers should not need to mask their identity to be successful, Salmonson asked Lindholm to use her full name for the story. Lindholm replied that she was not fond of her first name Margaret, and that while "Megan's not too bad", she preferred the initial "M.". Salmonson instead credited her in the anthology as Megan Lindholm. Amazons! went on to win a World Fantasy Award in 1980, and Lindholm's story attracted the attention of Terri Windling, an editor at Ace Books, leading to the publication of her debut novel Harpy's Flight.

The novel was influenced by a short story from Fritz Leiber in which his protagonist Fafhrd's hand is cut off. Lindholm was upset by the story and wrote to Leiber, an author she had admired, asking him how he could be so harsh to a hero he had written frequently about. Leiber replied with a handwritten letter. Stating his view that characters could not be static, but had to face challenges and evolve, he questioned if there could be any point in happy endings if stories simply ended the same way they began. Lindholm felt this was a wake-up call and found that in her own writing, she had been overly protective of her protagonists. She then reworked an unfinished story and "finally allowed life to happen to some of my characters", which developed into Harpy's Flight. At the time she wrote the book, Lindholm was aged thirty and worked as a waitress. She balanced between writing and raising children while her husband, a commercial fisherman, worked offshore for seven to eight months of the year.

In the US, Harpy's Flight was published by Ace Books in 1983. Since its protagonists Ki and Vandien had appeared earlier in "Bones for Dulath", the book was released under the same byline as the short story, Megan Lindholm. The author said she had "mixed feelings" about her new byline, under which she would continue to publish novels for the next decade. Ki and Vandien featured in three further books that are known along with Harpy's Flight as the Windsingers series and also as the Ki and Vandien quartet. According to Lindholm, all four novels can be read independently. The next two books followed in 1984: The Windsingers and The Limbreth Gate, both illustrated by Kinuko Y. Craft. The Windsingers is also the title of a UK omnibus of the first three books, published in 1985 by Corgi Books. The fourth volume Luck of the Wheels was released by Ace in 1989, with a cover drawn by Richard Hescox.

== Plot ==
Harpy's Flight begins with a woman named Ki scaling a mountain to reach a harpy's nest. Seeking to avenge her husband and children who were killed by harpies, Ki battles and slays a female harpy and its eggs. A male is burned but survives. Since harpies have the power to grant visions of the dead, they are worshipped as gods by a section of human society, including the family of Ki's husband Sven. Ki tries to prevent Sven's family from learning of his death and her actions against the harpies, but she fails. Fleeing, she takes up a job to transport jewels across a mountain. There she meets Vandien, a starving swordsman who tries to steal her horse. Ki and Vandien become friends. They are betrayed by Sven's family to the surviving male harpy, who attacks them and wounds Vandien before being defeated.

Vandien is left with a scar on his face that he seeks to heal in the second volume, The Windsingers. He is promised treatment if he steals a treasure from the Windsingers, beings with the ability to control the weather through songs. He hides this quest from Ki, who accepts a job from Dresh, a wizard who is in conflict with the Windsingers. Wishing to obtain the treasure for himself, Dresh tricks Ki into entering the world where the Windsingers live; he is opposed by a Windsinger called Rebekeh. A battle ensues between them, which Ki enters to ensure that Rebekah wins. Vandien ends the story retaining his scar as Ki tells him that she likes him regardless of his disfigurement.

In The Limbreth Gate, Ki is manipulated by a faction of the Windsingers into walking through the Limbreth Gate, on the other side of which she finds a strange world. People are lulled into a peaceful, dream-like state while a being called the Limbreth consumes their humanity. Vandien breaks through the Gate and attempts to free Ki, but she refuses to leave, believing that she no longer likes Ki and has found happiness with the Limbreth. Vandien is conflicted and does not want to act against her wishes, but his companion Brujan frees Ki with the help of the Windsinger Rebekah.

== Themes ==
Over the course of the Windsingers series, Ki comes to terms with her grief at the loss of her family through her companionship with Vandien. In a 1996 reference work on science fiction and fantasy, contributor Sue Storm positions the series within the emergence of female heroes in the fantasy genre in the 1970s and 1980s. While most such characters were "larger-than-life" heroines, according to Storm this is not the case with Ki, who is more down-to-earth. Storm writes that the dynamic between Ki and Vandien, a man and woman portrayed as equals, is gentle and centers on the principle of "never giving anything that is not freely given and never taking what is not freely offered". In a similar view, scholar Alexei Kondratiev states that the focus of the series is on "essentially, married life, the role of freedom and attachment in a mature love-relationship." Author Mary Gentle adds that feminist themes are explored through the two characters in the preceding short story "Bones for Dulath".

== Reception ==
Harpy's Flight was a midlist title in the United States and did not recoup its author's advance, according to Lindholm. She described its sales as "mediocre" and as "a nice little addendum to your income, but don't quit your day job". Two decades after its publication, in the wake of the author's commercial success as Robin Hobb, publishers in France began to be interested in her Lindholm backlist and a translation of the Windsingers series was released in 2004. In a review of the French editions, Le Monde described the books as pleasurable reads but found them lacking in creativity, in contrast to Lindholm's later writings. Agreeing that the series was not as original as Lindholm's later works, Brian Stableford referred to it as "stereotypical commodified fantasy". While terming Harpy's Flight conventional, scholar Darren Harris-Fain wrote that it was a promising debut, and author Charles de Lint felt the series made Lindholm "a bright new talent in the fantasy field" in 1986.

Lindholm's portrayal of the characters Ki and Vandien received critical praise. In a review of the first novel, Black Gate found the protagonists multifaceted and felt that they had a "real, palpable friendship" that grew as the narrative progressed. Storm argued that as a man and woman who lived as equals, their dynamic was "more human-to-human" than could be found in most speculative fiction of the time. Describing their companionship as warm and filled with "life-affirming banter", she wrote that they made the series "come alive". de Lint similarly remarked on Lindholm's "gift for characterization" in the first three volumes. In a review of the fourth book Luck of the Wheels, SF Site commented that Vandien was "very dashing, a bit devil-may-care", while Ki was "very common-sensical, very independent", and that they were well-constructed, with personalities that evolved over the course of the story. SF Site also praised the depiction of the side-characters Willow and Goat.

The worldbuilding of the series was described by Kondratiev as one of its strengths. Black Gate remarked on Lindholm's "tremendous talent for creating truly strange, alien worlds", writing that the harpies' ability to allow communion with the dead made their relationship with human society "terrible, almost heartbreaking". SF Site added that the fourth volume had a well-portrayed nomadic society. Critic Don D'Ammassa agreed that the setting was interesting, but he found the story as a whole to be unremarkable.

Several reviewers found the plot fast-paced and filled with action, and the preceding short story "Bones for Dulath" was well-received as a work of sword and sorcery. Le Monde praised the way in which Lindholm interspersed Ki's flashbacks about her husband's family with her trek through the mountains in the first volume. While agreeing that the structure of the book was clever, Vector criticized Harpy's Flight as lacking tension, feeling that the most exciting part of the story, the encounter with the harpies, occurred at the beginning. The reviewer found its ending to be an anticlimax.

== Editions ==
- Harpy's Flight. Ace Books. 1983. ISBN 978-0-441-31746-2.
- The Windsingers. Ace Books. January 1984. ISBN 978-0-441-89248-8.
- The Limbreth Gate. Ace Books. July 1984. ISBN 978-0-441-48358-7.
- The Windsingers (omnibus of Harpy's Flight, The Windsingers and Limbreth Gate). Corgi Books. 1985. ISBN 978-0-55-299182-7.
- Luck of the Wheels. Ace Books. December 1989. ISBN 978-0-441-50436-7.
