= Alien Earth (novel) =

1992 science fiction novel by Megan Lindholm

- Author: Megan Lindholm
- Cover artist: Oscar Chichoni
- Genre: Science fiction
- Publisher: Bantam Spectra
- Publication date: 1992
- Publication place: United States
- ISBN: 0-553-29749-X

Alien Earth is a science fiction novel by American author Megan Lindholm, published in 1992 by Bantam Spectra. A French translation has been released. In the United States, it went out of print in 1992 and was unavailable until an ebook edition was released in 2011.

== Synopsis ==
In a future where Earth is highly polluted, an alien race evacuates humans to distant planets via sentient spacecraft called Beastships. The book begins long after the evacuation has occurred, when a secret group of humans seek to return to Earth to find if it is now habitable. It follows a Beastship called Evangeline and her passengers: her captain, a crewmember and a stowaway.

== Reception and analysis ==
In 1992, Booklist said the novel showed Lindholm's "excellence and versatility", and the Chicago Sun-Times called her "a skilled hand" in both fantasy and science fiction. Describing Alien Earth as a "marvelous book" with likable characters, 2AM magazine compared it to the works of Frederick Pohl and Sherri Tepper. The reviewer Irwin Chapman said that he had nominated it for consideration for a Nebula. In 2006 Le Monde, reviewing the French translation, called it "pure science fiction, of a beautiful richness". Locus had a mixed reaction to the book.

Ecological themes are portrayed through the story, where the aliens are deceptive in their claim that Earth is inhospitable to humans. Over the course of the book, humanity discovers the necessity of a balanced ecology. Its science fictional motifs include space travel via suspended animation. According to John Clute, the Beastships of Alien Earth share resemblances to liveships, sentient nautical ships in the author's later work as Robin Hobb.
