= Ship of Magic =

1998 novel by Robin Hobb

- First edition (US)
- Author: Robin Hobb
- Audio read by: Anne Flosnik and Lucy Tregear
- Cover artist: Stephen Youll (US) and John Howe (UK)
- Language: English
- Series: Liveship Traders Trilogy
- Genre: Fantasy
- Publisher: Bantam Spectra (US); Voyager Books (UK)
- Publication date: March 2, 1998
- Publication place: United States
- Media type: Print (Hardback & Paperback)
- Pages: 880
- ISBN: 0-00-225478-6 (first edition, hardback)
- OCLC: 43258997
- Followed by: The Mad Ship

Ship of Magic is a 1998 fantasy novel by American writer Robin Hobb, the first in her Liveship Traders Trilogy. These books centre around the Vestrit family, a trader family residing in Bingtown.

The Liveship Trilogy is the second from the Realm of the Elderlings series, which follows on from the events of the Farseer Trilogy.

== Synopsis ==
=== Setting ===
A "liveship" is a ship made of Wizardwood, a mystical substance from up the Rain Wild River. When three generations of a ship's owners die on board, a liveship "quickens", becoming a sentient being with a personality, the memories of the dead ancestors, and a psychic connection to living family members. Only a liveship is capable of crossing the perilous Rain Wild River to trade with the Rain Wilders, who have valuable goods plundered from an ancient Elderling ruin. Vivacia is the ship bought by the Vestrit family, who are still in debt to the Rain Wilders for the price of the Wizardwood.

The Vestrits live in Bingtown, which borders the sea and Jamaillia, Chalced, and the Rain Wilds. Their charter comes from Jamaillia; however, the Satrap, the current leader of Jamaillia, has ignored the promises his ancestors have made with Bingtown. Chalced's influence and customs are spreading throughout the world. In Bingtown, the culture is increasingly patriarchal and the practice of slavery puts a financial strain on many Trader families.

=== Plot summary ===
Captain Ephron Vestrit dies on the Vivacia and she quickens. His daughter, Althea, thought she would be the ship's new captain and is shocked to learn that Ephron has given Vivacia to her sister, Keffria, who in turn gives captainship to Kyle, her Chalcedean husband. Kyle believes he can restore the family fortune by entering the slave trade and banishes Althea from the ship. Althea sets off to prove she is a capable sailor. Amber, a foreign carpenter in Bingtown, aids her before she leaves. Because a blood relative of the Vestrit family must sail with the ship, Kyle forces his son Wintrow, who is training to be a priest of Sa, to serve aboard the ship. Wintrow has a growing bond with Vivacia, but finds it hard to adjust to life on the ship and cruel treatment from Kyle and the crew. Ronica, the Vestrit matriarch, begins to fear the control Kyle has over the family.

The ambitious pirate captain Kennit desires to unite all pirate townships under himself as king. He intends to capture and sail a liveship in order to do so. Kennit's first mate convinces him to capture slaver ships to free the slaves while throwing the slavers overboard. Because of this, Kennit unwittingly gains support, influence, and legendary status in the pirate townships. Etta, a whore in Divvytown who Kennit has favored and who loves him, is brought on board. Kennit is attacked by a sea serpent; Etta severs his leg in order to rescue him.

In Bingtown, Keffria and Ronica attempt to manage the Vestrit family's finances. They bring Malta, Keffria's rebellious daughter, to a meeting between the Bingtown traders and the Rain Wild Traders. Malta inadvertently captures the attention of Reyn Khuprus, the son of an influential Rain Wilder family; he begins courting her.

Althea works on board a slaughtership, disguised as a young boy, in order to prove her seaworthiness. Brashen Trell, former first mate on the Vivacia and a disowned son of another prominent Bingtown family, is also serving on the ship. He keeps her identity secret and they have a brief relationship. Althea is rejected when the captain of the slaughtership discovers her true name. Althea and Brashen separate after a romantic dispute. Brashen takes a position on a pirate's trader ship. Althea joins the crew of the liveship Ophelia (owned by the Tenira family), and heads back to Bingtown to negotiate with her family.

Wintrow attempts to escape Kyle and abandons Vivacia, but he is captured by slavers and is tattooed as a slave. Kyle buys Wintrow and declares him the property of Vivacia. Separation from Wintrow, the violence and suffering of the slaves, and Wintrow's negative emotions cause Vivacia to become unstable. Slaves on the ship revolt, killing the entire crew except for Kyle and Wintrow, forcing Vivacia to feel the suffering of all. Shortly after, Kennit and his crew set their sights on Vivacia and board her. Wintrow bargains with Kennit, offering to treat Kennit's infected leg and help sail Vivacia in exchange for keeping Kyle alive. Vivacia, intrigued by Kennit, agrees to become his pirate ship.

== Reception ==
Ship of Magic has generally received positive reviews. Reviewers praised the novel’s complex characters and plotlines. Wayne MacLaurin for SF Site said the book "weaves an intricate web of sword play, intrigue, family conflict and personal struggle all the while dropping delicious hints of darker secrets and unknown magic."

Kirkus Reviews gave a more tentative review, saying the book had "plenty of promising ideas and material, but heavily padded and with utterly inconclusive plotlines".

Criticism of the novel mostly revolves around the story length, with some feeling the book is "perhaps a hundred pages too long."
