= Soldier Son trilogy =

Fantasy novel series by Robin Hobb

- UK edition
- Shaman's Crossing; Forest Mage; Renegade's Magic
- Author: Robin Hobb
- Cover artist: Jackie Morris
- Country: United Kingdom
- Language: English
- Genre: Fantasy
- Publisher: Voyager (UK), Eos (US)
- Published: 2005–07

The Soldier Son trilogy is a fantasy novel series by Robin Hobb. Set in a new world unrelated to her previous trilogies, the Soldier Son trilogy follows the life of Nevare Burvelle, the second son of a newly elevated Lord of the Kingdom of Gernia.

== Plot ==
The career of a person living in Gernia is heavily influenced by their parentage. The sons that are born to common parentage follow their father's career. However, it is different for the sons of a noble. The eldest son inherits his father's title, the second son serves as an officer in the army, the third son enters priesthood, and the fourth son becomes an artist. This allocation continues for further sons. Daughters are relegated to submissive roles, being primarily used to forge social links with arranged marriages.

The first book, Shaman's Crossing, concerns Nevare's education. As a young boy on the vast plains, his position as the second son, the Soldier Son, is cemented from birth. From an early age, Nevare is drilled in mounted cavalla (Cavalry) techniques, riding, survival, tactics, and all aspects of life as an officer in the King's Cavalla. As a teenager, he has a first encounter with the Specks' magic (see below), which will influence the rest of his life. Later, as a young man, Nevare's education at the King's Cavalla Academy begins. Nevare suffers the consequences of being the son of a New Noble, when the struggle between Old Nobles and New Nobles in the court of Gernia affects the supposedly independent Academy.

Book two, Forest Mage, concerns Nevare's trip in disgrace to a town near Gettys, and his time at this furthest outpost in the King's Road construction. His connection with the Specks, a race of tree people who live on after their corporeal lives, develops further. The changes imposed to his body by the Specks' magic he wields, causes rejection and discrimination by most Gernians, including his family. In spite of it, he still pursues his dream of a military career. At the same time, he also attempts to save the Specks' ancestors forest from the devastations produced by the Gernian's road advance.

The third and final book, Renegade's Magic, details Nevare's sojourn with the Specks in their extensive forest near the Barrier Mountains. His cousin and her husband Spink continue to deal with events in Gettys. Nevare's disjoint personalities are united to realize the initial goal of the magic, in spite of the serious consequences it has on Nevare's life. However, balance is finally achieved.

== Themes ==
The Soldier Son trilogy is set in a post-colonial secondary world that has drawn resemblance to the nineteenth century American frontier. Scholars have identified critiques of colonialism in Hobb's writing, as well as an examination of culture-specific honor systems that blurs boundaries between the "self" and the "other".

A civilised and warlike nation, Gernia, has taken to expanding its boundaries inland as a result of its coastal lands being lost to a neighbour's vastly superior naval force. The move inland involves conquering and assimilating native people, the Plainsmen and the Specks. It has been only one or two generations since the Plainsmen were beaten into submission, and racial and cultural tensions simmer underneath the thin veneer of civilization. Even earlier, the Specks had beaten the fiercest Plainsmen warriors with magic. Both Gernians and Specks consider their societies, philosophies, and ways of life the only "civilized" options.

The greater themes of the series are: post-colonial backlash, loss of cultural identity, racial preconception and discrimination, and "Going Native"- a term applied to those of "civilized" nature who abandon their own culture and adopt the lifestyle of a more "savage" persuasion. Rigid class and gender stratification and limited opportunities for everybody are consistent with post-colonial times. Explicit magic and shamanism opposes conventional religion and rationalism.

== Reception ==
Writing in The Times, critic Amanda Craig said the Soldier Son trilogy was filled with believable characters, and commended the series as "the kind of fantasy that Anthony Trollope would have written if he lived now". Craig described Hobb's writing as having a "gloriously original touch", and viewed the series' themes as a critique of military aggression in the wake of the Iraq War. The Guardian likewise felt the Soldier Son novels were "intelligent and deep", but critiqued them for lacking "the heart and page-turning spark" of Hobb's Elderlings series.

== Sources ==
- Carroll, Siobhan (2007). "Honor-bound: Self and Other in the Honor Culture of Robin Hobb's Soldier Son Series". Journal of the Fantastic in the Arts. 18 (3): 308–318. JSTOR 24351005.
- Larsson, Mariah (2021). "Bringing Dragons Back into the World: Dismantling the Anthropocene in Robin Hobb's The Realm of the Elderlings". In Höglund, Anna; Trenter, Cecilia (eds.). The Enduring Fantastic: Essays on Imagination and Western Culture. McFarland. ISBN 978-1-4766-8012-5.
- Young, Helen (2014). "Critiques of Colonialism in Robin Hobb's Soldier Son Trilogy". Extrapolation. 55 (1): 33–50. doi:10.3828/extr.2014.4.
