= The Mad Ship =

Novel by Robin Hobb

- 2000 Voyager paperback cover
- Author: Robin Hobb
- Cover artist: John Howe
- Language: English
- Series: Liveship Traders Trilogy
- Genre: Fantasy
- Publisher: Voyager
- Publication date: 19 November 1998
- Publication place: United Kingdom
- Media type: Print (Hardcover)
- Pages: 906
- ISBN: 0-00-225479-4
- OCLC: 41214530
- Preceded by: Ship of Magic
- Followed by: Ship of Destiny

The Mad Ship is a 1999 fantasy novel by American writer Robin Hobb, the second in her Liveship Traders Trilogy, which itself is the second trilogy of her 16-book Realm of the Elderlings series. The title appeared in the United States as simply Mad Ship.

== Plot ==
Aboard Vivacia, Wintrow saves Kennit's life by amputating the infected part of his leg. Kennit quickly charms Vivacia and she comes to believe in Kennit and his goal of becoming King of the Pirate Isles, aiding him in his piracy against slavers. Wintrow is wary of Vivacia's growing attachment to Kennit, but comes to believe in him as well, and bonds with Etta. Kennit imprisons Kyle on the secret isle where his mother lives in seclusion. Kennit was taken prisoner as a child by Igrot the pirate, who killed Kennit's father, cut out his mother's tongue, and made Kennit a pirate and abused him, a past which he hides from all.

Althea serves aboard the liveship Ophelia, which returns to Bingtown. Captain Tenira attempts to resist the Chalcedean galley that serves the Satrap and collects his taxes. This heightens political tensions in Bingtown as more of the Old Traders consider rebelling against the Satrap and his Chalcedean mercenaries. Althea returns to her family to attempt to repair their relationship.

Brashen, serving with a pirate ship, learns in Divvytown that Kennit has captured Vivacia. He returns to Bingtown to inform the Vestrit family. Ronica, Keffria, Althea, and Malta decide to put aside their differences to work on rescuing the ship. Malta appeals to Reyn Khuprus to help save her father, but he has his own problems. The Khuprus family owns the last Wizardwood log in the Rain Wilds, and Reyn has formed a psychic connection with the ancient dragon trapped within it. The dragon torments Reyn's dreams, attempting to convince him to set it free.

Brashen, Althea, and Amber come up with a plan to refit the mad liveship Paragon and sail him after Vivacia. They purchase Paragon and gather a crew before setting off for the pirate isles with Brashen as captain, Althea as second mate, and Amber aboard, but there is a high risk that Paragon will kill the crew.

In Jamailia, Serilla is a Heart Companion to the Satrap Cosgo and an expert of Bingtown history. The lazy, pleasure-seeking Satrap is cruel to anyone that does not flatter him, increasingly influenced by Chalcedeans, and uninterested in politics. The Satrap plans a trip to Bingtown and sets sail with Serilla; Serilla hopes to escape there to have a life free of him. When Serilla continues to criticize the Satrap, he gives her over to the Chalcedean captain to be held captive and raped. When the Satrap falls ill, Serilla coerces him into signing a document that gives her his full political authority in Bingtown.

At Malta's presentation ball, she is introduced to the recently arrived Satrap. Serilla tells Reyn of a coup that is about to be launched: the Satrap will be killed and Bingtown blamed. The Vestrits are in Davad Restart's coach with the Satrap when it is taken by highwaymen. Davad is killed, the Satrap is abducted, and the Vestrits flee with Reyn to the Rain Wilds while the Chalcedeans torch Bingtown. Ronica stays behind to face the political upheaval.

Some time later, Malta recovers while the Rain Wilders house the Satrap. The cocooned dragon calls to Malta, promising to rescue Vivacia and Kyle if she frees it. Malta enters the buried city, but a large earthquake strikes. She rescues the Satrap from a damaged chamber. Reyn and Selden search for Malta in the ruins and successfully free the dragon by exposing her log to sunlight. The dragon leaves, determined to reestablish dragons after their long absence, but decides to honor her promises and rescue the people who freed her.

Maulkin the serpent manages to make some wild serpents remember their names. The tangle comes upon a liveship which they believe is somehow one of them. They destroy the ship, in the process awaking the original memories in the wizardwood, revealing that it was a dragon once. The serpents eat the wood that was his cocoon and recover more memories. Serpents are meant to journey up the Rain Wild rivers in order to create cocoons for the winter. Through this, serpents metamorphose and hatch as full-fledged dragons when exposed to sunlight. "Wizardwood" of the Rain Wilds is actually the cocoons of ancient dragons that did not hatch after the Elderling city was buried. With each wizardwood log cut down, a dormant dragon is killed and filled with human memories. Without dragons to lead the serpents, they are in danger of extinction.

Kennit and his ships return to Divvytown to find it ransacked. Wintrow talks the survivors out of killing Kennit, further establishing him as King of the pirates. Kennit decides that Wintrow must go to the Other's Isle and receive a prophecy. There, Wintrow goes off to look along the beach, but instead of an artifact, finds a path that leads him to a cage with a trapped serpent. He breaks her out of the cage, coming in contact with her and gaining her memories. The serpent, whom the Others imprisoned to be their oracle, is She Who Remembers, one who carries the memories of many and leads others to the cocooning grounds. She Who Remembers searches for other serpents.

== Reception ==
Reviews of The Mad Ship varied. One reviewer called the book "a strong and vivid novel", and another stated the book held "a spell-binding story full of wonderful characters and intrigue". Multiple reviewers commented on the multi-dimensional characters used in the story, highlighting it as one of the novel's strengths.

About the plot of the book, Kirkus Reviews said "Hobb displays a wonderful imagination but has cast aside any remaining inclination toward control."

== Editions ==
- A British English paperback edition was issued in London by Voyager/HarperCollins in 1999 with ISBN 0-00-649886-8. This edition's cover is illustrated by John Howe.
- A new version of the Liveship Traders Trilogy series audiobook was re-released by Audible in February 2026, narrated by actress, Lucy Tregear.
