= Reindeer People =

Book series by Megan Lindholm

- Omnibus edition
- The Reindeer People; Wolf's Brother
- Author: Megan Lindholm
- Illustrator: Vincent Segrelles, Tom Kidd
- Country: United States
- Language: English
- Genre: Prehistoric fiction, fantasy
- Publisher: Ace Books, SFBC
- Published: 1988

The Reindeer People is a prehistoric fiction series by American author Megan Lindholm, published in 1988 by Ace Books.

== Synopsis ==
The story centers on a female healer called Tillu who is kidnapped by reindeer herders and bears a son, Kerlew, who has disabilities. It follows their move to a different tribe in pursuit of freedom, Kerlew's apprenticeship to a shaman and the growth of Tillu's relationship with a herdsman.

== Reception and analysis ==
Reviewing the French edition in 2004, Le Monde described it as "a remarkable novel, fascinating, harsh" with a strong female protagonist, and lamented the delay in its release in France. Scholar Nicholas Ruddick praised Lindholm's portrayal of "the flowering of Tillu’s selfhood" in a society where she does not fit in. In 1989, Vector found the first novel well-characterized, and Interzone praised the second book's depiction of prehistoric tribes as realistic. A 1996 reference work was more critical, writing that Tillu was portrayed in "too modern" a fashion to fit within a historical setting. In 1990, Vector stated that the depiction of magic in Wolf's Brother was "refreshingly subtle" but was overall critical of the book, finding the characters "sketchily drawn", the story unengaging and the ending anticlimactic.

According to Ruddick, the Reindeer People is set in Bronze Age Lapland and features a Paleo-Lappish society. Describing the series as a prehistoric romance, he writes that it has thematic similarities to Jean M. Auel's Earth's Children series, in particular her historical romance The Plains of Passage. A theme explored in the story is the liberty of women in the prehistoric tribe.

== Editions ==
- The Reindeer People. Ace Books. May 1988. ISBN 0-441-71233-9.
- Wolf's Brother. Ace Books. October 1988. ISBN 0-441-71234-7.
- A Saga of the Reindeer People (omnibus of The Reindeer People and Wolf's Brother). SFBC. May 1989.
