= Forest Mage =

2006 novel by Robin Hobb

- First edition (UK)
- Author: Robin Hobb
- Cover artist: John Howe (UK)
- Language: English
- Series: Soldier Son Trilogy
- Genre: Fantasy
- Publisher: Voyager Books (UK) & EOS (US)
- Publication date: 3 July 2006 (UK) & September 2006 (US)
- Publication place: United States
- Media type: Print (hardback & paperback)
- Pages: 660 (hardback edition)
- ISBN: 0-00-719615-6 (UK hardback edition)
- OCLC: 65202841
- Preceded by: Shaman's Crossing
- Followed by: Renegade's Magic

Forest Mage is a 2006 fantasy novel by American writer Robin Hobb, the second in her Soldier Son Trilogy.

== Plot introduction ==
The Gernian Cavalla Academy that has been established according to the King's wishes has suffered from the rivalry between the Old Lords and the King's New Lords. These are newly raised soldiers who won distinction in the push east and the conflicts with the plains people. However a new foe appears in the guise of the "Specks".

The book is written in first person, in the perspective of the main character, Nevare Burvelle.

== Plot summary ==
The story picks up where Shaman's Crossing left off. The Gernian Cavalla Academy is recovering from the devastating effects of Speck plague, a disease causing severe dysentery. The disease has run through the ranks of all the academy (and civilian) population of Old Thares, killing many of the Old and New Noble soldier sons and leaving the academy ranks severely depleted. Many who were fortunate enough to have survived the outbreak, including Nevare Burvelle's friend Spinrek "Spink" Kester, have been forced to resign from the academy and return to their homes to struggle with the long-term effects of the disease.

Cadet Burvelle also returns home, to attend his brother Rosse's wedding. Nevare continues to have dreams about a seductive Speck woman (usually referred to as "Tree Woman") whom he fought to stop the plague epidemic in the dreamworld. On the way home, he stops as a tourist to see a giant spindle-shaped monument belonging to the Kidona plains people, but the Speck magic working through him causes him to accidentally destroy it.

Unlike most of those who were affected by the plague, Nevare was not left weak and gaunt after his bout of plague; in fact, he is swiftly gaining weight. This fact is annoying but does not affect his thinking too much as he travels home expecting to meet with his betrothed, a beautiful young noblewoman, Carsina. Yet the reaction he receives on returning home brings into stark relief the physical problem that he struggles with: the Speck plague has caused him to "grow" rather than shrink and waste away. This is a virtually unknown reaction to the plague and is seen by Nevare's father, who will not listen to his excuses, as the result of gluttony.

Nevare also visits his old mentor, the Kidona warrior Dewara who introduced him to the dream world. The Kidona tribe has been reduced to a bunch of derelicts living on a reservation due to the actions of the Gernian government. Dewara also blames Nevare for being seduced by Tree Woman and destroying the Spindle, the source of Kidona magic.

Nevare's betrothal to Carsina, though informal, is cancelled. After his fruitless attempts to lose weight, Nevare is locked away by his father and his meals regulated. However, while Nevare is locked away, a plague ravages the Widevale Estate, killing many, including his mother, eldest sister and brother Rosse. Nevare and his sister Yaril survive and run the estate while their father is in mourning, but when their father recovers, he banishes and disowns Nevare. Nevare travels east toward the remote outpost Gettys.

On the way, he stops at a small settlement called "Dead Town" and helps a widow, Amzil, and her three children by doing odd jobs to make their lives easier, in exchange he gets to eat and sleep there. Nevare wants to win Amzil's trust, but she finds it hard to trust men, having had to work as a prostitute to feed herself and her children. One day, a wounded cavalla scout named Buel Hitch reaches the town and asks Nevare's assistance in getting to Gettys, to which Nevare agrees. As they leave, he uses his dormant Speck magic to create a bountiful vegetable garden for Amzil, and his Speck self comes closer to the surface. On their journey to Gettys, Nevare realises that Hitch is in a similar position to his: he is a tool of the Speck magic also.

The Gernian goal of building a highway through the forest is being blocked by Speck magic. He enlists in the army there, but only as a lowly cemetery guard, a far cry from his former goal of a cavalla officer. He works very hard and the colonel is thinking about promoting him. After a while he meets two Specks, a girl named Olikea and her father. Olikea brings Nevare food that satisfies the magic that runs through his veins. He is getting pulled between two worlds, the Gernian world and the Specks' magical forests. He does not know where to settle down and he does not wish to betray his own people. Nevare's reputation is damaged by his gross appearance and his attempts to talk to his ex-fiancée Carsina, who has moved to Gettys with her new husband. Spink Kester and Nevare's Cousin Epiny, married, are also in town, but he distances himself so as not to ruin their reputation.

One day at his way home he gets attacked and shot in the head. His horse is stolen and he is left on the ground with his head bleeding. However, he survives and the wound heals rapidly due to his magic. Unfortunately, Nevare's magic is not as strong as it could be, since he has been avoiding the Specks so he could not get the magical food that Olikea brought. The cavalla scout Buel Hitch (also a Gernian seduced by the Specks) uses the stolen horse's bridle to strangle a prostitute who was friendly with Nevare, thus framing him for murder.

As days go by, the Speck plague sweeps by the outpost of Gettys so Nevare is kept busy as cemetery guard/gravedigger. Among the dead is Carsina, who revives briefly at the cemetery and is cared for by Nevare, then dies in his bed. He is accused of necrophilia in addition to the earlier murder, and sentenced to be tortured and hanged. But fortunately for Nevare, the Tree Woman comes and frees him from his cell and impending doom. During his escape, confrontations with Spinrek and Amzil and the townspeople force Nevare to finally give in to the magic. With his magic, he gives the townspeople false memories of his death before embracing his future life in the forest.
