= Ship of Destiny =

Novel by Robin Hobb

- First edition (UK)
- Author: Robin Hobb
- Cover artist: John Howe
- Language: English
- Series: Liveship Traders Trilogy
- Genre: Fantasy
- Publisher: Voyager
- Publication date: August 1, 2000
- Publication place: United States
- Media type: Print (hardcover)
- Pages: 903
- ISBN: 0-553-10323-7
- OCLC: 43798455
- Dewey Decimal: 813/.54 21
- LC Class: PS3558.O33636 S53 2000
- Preceded by: The Mad Ship

Ship of Destiny is a book by American writer Robin Hobb, the third and last in her Liveship Traders Trilogy.

== Plot summary ==
Much of Bingtown has been destroyed after the night of the Satrap's disappearance. Factions in Bingtown struggle against each other even as they hold off the invading Chalcedeans. Ronica Vestrit comes to accept that Bingtown must turn away from its traditions to survive. She clashes with Serilla, the companion to the Satrap who has assumed his authority to protect herself. With the help of Rache, a slave, Ronica seeks to unite the Old Traders, New Traders, Three Ships folk, and the ex-slave Tattooed to form a new, independent order in Bingtown.

In the Rain Wilds, Tintaglia, the dragon freed by Reyn and Selden, saves them from the ruins of the underground city. Malta is stranded in a boat with the Satrap floating down the Rain Wild River. They are rescued by a Chalcedean ship. Malta ensures their survivals by influencing the Satrap's behavior. The Vestrits and some Rain Wilders return to Bingtown, where they help negotiate a united Bingtown. Tintaglia is determined to rescue her kind from extinction. She defeats the Chalcedean warships and proposes an alliance with the Bingtowners. Reyn and Selden are changed by their connection to the dragon, becoming like the ancient Elderlings. Reyn agrees to help Tintaglia on the condition that she helps him find Malta.

On Vivacia, Wintrow recovers from his contact with the serpent She Who Remembers. He now knows liveships are created from the cocoons of dead dragons. When Vivacia learns this, she is so distraught that she flees inside herself. She reawakes with the memories of a conniving dragon named Bolt. Bolt bargains with Kennit: she communicates Kennit's orders to the serpents in exchange for Kennit eventually letting the ship guide the serpents up the Rain Wild River. With the serpents serving him, Kennit's power grows. Etta secretly aims to become pregnant with his child, while Wintrow grows to love Etta.

Althea and Brashen sail the mad liveship Paragon in hopes of retrieving Vivacia. Paragon arrives in Divvytown and it is revealed that Paragon is the liveship Igrot the Terrible sailed. Kennit is a descendent of the Ludluck family who was bonded with Paragon and kept hostage on him. Paragon pursues Vivacia. Althea and Brashen plan to negotiate, but Kennit attacks Paragon with the serpents. He speaks with Paragon about their past agreement: they contrived that Paragon would absorb all Kennit's memories of Igrot's abuse so that Kennit could start over. Paragon then attempted to sink himself, but eventually returned to Bingtown. Kennit believes he must erase his painful past by gaining all the power that Igrot had, so he orders Paragon to die again, sending the ship into a storm. Kennit then takes Althea hostage and attempts to manipulate her to join him. While she is drugged, Kennit rapes her. When Althea later manages to escape, her story is not believed even by Wintrow and the reawakened Vivacia, who trust that Kennit is doing good for the Pirate Isles. Only Etta realizes that Althea is telling the truth, creating a rift in her relationship with Kennit and eventually Wintrow's as well.

Brashen manages to sail Paragon to safety. Despite still loving Kennit, Paragon decides he must confront the pirate again. Paragon allows Amber to carve him a new face, lessening his madness somewhat. He tells the crew where they can find Kennit's mother, whom they take hostage along with Kyle (now mentally broken from his long-term isolation) before pursuing Vivacia again.

Malta decides to secure the Satrap's life by having him ally with Kennit. They board Vivacia with the promise that Jaimaillia will recognize Kennit's kingship of the Pirate Isles, but they are soon attacked by Jamaillian and Chalcedean ships attempting to assassinate the Satrap. During the battle, Tintaglia arrives with Reyn, dropping him off before leading the serpents away. The Satrap is captured; Kennit attempts to take him back and is mortally wounded. Paragon arrives in time for Kennit to die on his deck so that Paragon absorbs his memories and becomes complete. Wintrow takes command of Vivacia's crew while Althea chooses to reunite with Brashen. Kyle is killed by an arrow barrage as Paragon and Althea escape their attackers.

In the aftermath, the Satrap is restored to power and an alliance is formed between the separate states of Jamaillia, Bingtown, and the Pirate Isles. Etta will rule as Pirate Queen with Wintrow's help until Kennit's child comes of age. Ronica, Keffria, and Serilla work to establish the new political order of Bingtown. Reyn and Malta, now engaged and becoming Elderlings, represent the Rain Wilders' and Tintaglia's interests. Althea is first mate to Brashen on Paragon, and the ship eventually helps her let go of the trauma of her rape. Wintrow captains Vivacia and helps Tintaglia lead the serpents to their cocooning grounds, where they prepare to become dragons.

== Reception ==
Reviews of Ship of Destiny have varied, but were generally positive. Many reviewers have praised Hobb's writing skill with one stating in Ship of Destiny she "has woven her storylines and subplots into an extraordinarily vivid and complex tapestry." However, some reviewers felt the book was excessively long, referring to it as a "doorstop". Still, reviewers felt the book brought a satisfying conclusion to the Liveship Traders Trilogy.
