= Fool's Assassin =

2014 book by Robin Hobb

- First edition (US)
- Author: Robin Hobb
- Cover artist: Alejandro Colucci
- Language: English
- Series: Fitz and the Fool Trilogy
- Genre: Fantasy novel
- Publisher: Voyager Books (UK); Del Rey Books (US)
- Publication date: 12 August 2014
- Publication place: United States
- Media type: Print (Hardback)
- Pages: 640 pp (first edition, hardback)
- ISBN: 978-0-5533-9243-2
- OCLC: 869308079
- Followed by: Fool's Quest

Fool's Assassin is the first book in the epic fantasy trilogy Fitz and the Fool, written by American author Robin Hobb. Ten years after the events of Fool's Fate, it resumes the story of FitzChivalry Farseer, a former assassin, as a middle-aged husband and father whose quiet life is disrupted by a new crisis.

== Plot summary ==
FitzChivalry ("Fitz") is a bastard of the royal Farseer family of the Six Duchies, who had previously used his inherited magical Skill in the service of his king. After his past heroic sacrifices, Fitz had allowed all but his closest family and friends to believe that he had been killed. Under the name Tom Badgerlock, Fitz had enjoyed ten peaceful years with his wife and step-children as landholder of Withywoods, once the country estate of his father.

The book opens during Winterfest at Withywood. A pale messenger had arrived at the beginning of Winterfest, but disappears soon after three menacing, white strangers arrive. Blood is found, and the messenger presumed dead. Fitz is on alert, but soon goes back into the routine of Withywood.

Fitz's wife Molly informs him she is pregnant. Fitz doubts she is indeed pregnant, as she is long past her child bearing years. Fitz and Nettle (Molly and Fitz’s first daughter) fear Molly is losing her mind. When finally the baby is born nearly two years later, she is tiny and slow to develop. Molly names her Bee.

The book continues interplaying the narration between Fitz and Bee, with some chapters told by Fitz and some by Bee.

Bee is unusually small, pale, and develops much slower than other children. Almost everyone, including Fitz, think she may be simple. Molly does not, and seems to understand Bee’s garbled words. Bee spies on the a few of the other children of Withywoods and they torment her for being different. Slapping her, one of them releases her tongue, seeming to explain that Bee was born tongue-tied and therefore unable to speak clearly until the incident. She also teaches herself to read and write, amazing her parents.

When Bee is around 9 years old, Molly dies suddenly of a heart attack. Fitz goes to pieces and Nettle wishes to take Bee with her to Buckkeep, but Fitz manages to convince her to let him prove himself as a father. He comes to know Bee much better, finding she is wise beyond her years. Lant, a failed apprentice of Chade, comes to Withywood to be scribe and tutor to Bee and the Withywood children. Chade also asks Fitz to take care of Shun, a spoiled lady a year or two younger than Lant. During this time, Bee becomes friends with the stable boy, Per (short for Perseverance).

As winter approaches, another mysterious pale messenger arrives at Withywood. The messenger is severely injured, but she passes on a message from the Fool before she dies: Fitz must look out for, and protect, the unexpected son.

Fitz and Bee go to Oaksbywater to buy things for Winterfest. It is supposed to be a father-daughter day and Bee looks forward to it. Riddle goes with them and - to Bee's dismay - Lant and Shun join them to buy baubles for Shun and some supplies for Lant. Fitz, Bee and Riddle witness a man torturing his dog to get people to buy her pups (though it turns out they are not truly hers). Fitz, overcome by the dog's feelings, kills her out of mercy and nearly kills her owner. His rage scares Bee and Riddle, but also makes her proud of him.

They stop at a tavern to eat and Lant and Shun join them. Bee does not enjoy them being there and leaves to use the privy. When she is outside, she encounters a beggar and decides to be brave like her father. She helps the blind beggar and when she touches him, he can see through her, and she sees visions like a white prophet. Just as he hugs her, Fitz comes looking for Bee, overcome with fear that something has happened to her. He stabs the beggar, thinking he is trying to harm Bee. The beggar turns out to be the Fool, appearing haggard and wraith like from extreme torture. Fitz attempts to save him, but can't. He decides to take the Fool to Buckkeep to be skill-healed and sends Bee home with Lant and Shun, who are upset their day has been ruined and that Fitz does not respect them. Riddle, Fitz and the Fool travel by skill-pillar to Buckkeep.

Lant and Shun are neglectful of Bee when they arrive at Withywoods. The next day, Bee and Perseverance are in class with the other children. Withywoods is attacked and Bee and Perseverance hide the children in the spy passages, but the other children close the passages on them. The attackers are a group of pale people dressed in white. Their leader is a woman and with her is a "fog-man" who seems like a child. They are aided by a group of Chalcedean mercenaries who kill, rape and pillage Withywoods, including killing Perseverance's father and grandfather inside. Perseverance managed to secure two horses and he and Bee attempt to escape. Perseverance is shot with an arrow and left for dead. Bee is taken by the pale people who declare she is the Unexpected Son.

== Reception ==
Critical reception for Fool's Assassin have been mostly positive. The Telegraph and Tor.com both gave favorable reviews for the work, which The Telegraph called "high art".
