= Space and Time (magazine) =

Speculative fiction magazine

- Editor: Angela Yuriko Smith
- Categories: Speculative fiction
- Frequency: Four times a year
- Publisher: Space and Time Publications
- Founded: 1966
- First issue: June 3, 1966
- Country: United States
- Based in: Independence, Missouri
- Language: English
- Website: spaceandtime.net
- ISSN: 0271-2512
- OCLC: 6584329

Space and Time is an American magazine featuring speculative fiction. Publication of Space and Time started by Gordon Linzner on June 3, 1966. It publishes strange and unusual fiction, poetry, and art. A new issue has been released four times a year since 2008.

Gordon Linzner edited and published the magazine from its start in 1966 to 2007 when Hildy Silverman succeeded him in the post. Silverman published the magazine for the next 12 years before announcing its closure in late 2018. Angela Yuriko Smith took over on January 1, 2019, as the new owner and publisher beginning with issue #133.

== Space and Time Books ==
In 1984, Space and Time went into publishing books, with the first book The Steel Eye by Chet Godfried. The press was taken over by Faith L. Justice in 2020.
