= Fool's Quest =

2015 book by Robin Hobb

- First edition (US)
- Author: Robin Hobb
- Cover artist: Alejandro Colucci
- Language: English
- Series: Fitz and the Fool Trilogy
- Genre: Fantasy novel
- Publisher: Voyager Books (UK); Del Rey Books (US)
- Publication date: 11 August 2015
- Publication place: United States
- Media type: Print (Hardback)
- ISBN: 978-0-00-744421-2
- OCLC: 919000626
- Preceded by: Fool's Assassin
- Followed by: Assassin's Fate

Fool's Quest is the second book in the epic fantasy trilogy Fitz and the Fool, written by American author Robin Hobb. It was published by HarperCollins and released in August, 2015 and continues the story of FitzChivalry Farseer and his daughter Bee after the events of Fool's Assassin, published in 2014.

== Plot summary ==
Fitz, Riddle and the Fool arrive at Buckkeep. They cannot risk a Skill-healing for the Fool since he is too weak. They have arrived for Winterfest. Since he is there, Chade puts him to work, and Fitz plays the part of a minor noble to explain his presence. He tries to heal the Fool as best he can, but the Fool remains near death. The Fool tells him how he returned to Clerres with Prillkop and that the Servants, the pale people who tend to While Prophets, are the ones who tortured him. They wanted him to tell them where the Unexpected Son was. The Fool thought they meant a son he was supposed to have, although the Fool knew of no such child.

Web asks Fitz to meet a crow who is not bonded with a human, but is in danger from other crows by having white feathers among her black ones. She can speak some words. Through Fitz, she meets the Fool and they connect. The Fool names her Motley. Chade has a new apprentice - Ash. Ash is very capable and both Fitz and the Fool grow to like him.

Despite the king forbidding her to marry, Nettle becomes pregnant with Riddle's child. Eliannia helps them marry, and recognizes Nettle and Riddle's unborn child and thinks it will be a girl. She wants to claim the child for her Motherhouse, and does so publicly on the last day of Winterfest, recognizing Nettle as Fitz's daughter. So she is not known as the son of a traitor, Kettricken has Starling finally sing the song she had made of Fitz, the journey into the mountains, and the stone dragons. Overcome by the moment, Chade tells Fitz it is time he is recognized for who he is. Dutiful recognizes Fitz in front of the court, and he is crowned Prince FitzChivalry.

News of what happened at Withywoods finally reaches Buckkeep, and both Fitz and Chade immediately return to Withywoods through the pillars. Chade reveals that both Lant and Shun (really named Shine) are both his children from different mothers. The staff do not remember what happened and do not remember Bee, Shun, or any of those killed. Per is the only one who knows what happened. Realizing some sort of skill spell has been placed on them, Chade and Fitz revive the staff's memory with elfbark tea. They gather as much information that they can, but cannot determine which way the invaders left.

Thinking the attack may have something to do with the servants who tortured the Fool, they plan to return to Buckkeep via the pillars to get information from him. They are attacked on the way by the guard accompanying them, who were after a reward for Chade's death. Chade is in very bad shape from the attack, but goes through the pillars anyway. He faints just as he enters, and Fitz has a hard time keeping Chade's essence together (one of the risks of the pillars). They are lost in the pillar for a day before Dutiful and his coterie help pull him out. Chade never fully recovers, and is forbidden from using the skill for fear he would completely lose himself in it.

While they had been gone, Ash gave the Fool dragon blood which puts him on the path to healing and turns his eyes gold. Fitz and the Fool discover Ash is really a girl named Spark; Spark can shift back and forth between being Ash and Spark, at Chade's encouragement.

Meanwhile, the Servants take Bee and Shun on a long journey. Shun tells Bee to make sure they don't realize she is a girl, since they think she is a boy. Shun thinks that this is the only reason they are keeping Bee and Shun alive. Bee becomes very ill with a high fever and begins to shed her skin. She is whiter underneath.

Ellik and his mercenaries figure out that the Servants are controlling them using Vindeliar, a white who has the ability to cause forgetfulness or change the thoughts of large groups of people at once (such as the forgetfulness of those at Withywoods). They take Vindeliar with them to town to test his powers and pillage. Once they get back to camp with all of their loot, they get drunk. Hogen, the handsome rapist, convinces Ellik to let him have one of the women. He gives him one of the Servants. Shun realizes what is happening and drags Bee away. The two of them try to escape.

In the meantime, Fitz is told by Dutiful and Nettle that they have figured out where Bee and Shun/Shine are. Soldiers are sent to intercept the Servants and their Chalcedean mercenaries. Fitz decides not to wait for others to find Bee for him, and leaves immediately. Riddle, Lant and Per catch up with Fitz, wanting to join him in finding Bee and Shun immediately. When they stop for the night, Fitz drugs them all and leaves. After travelling for long hours, Motely the crow leads him to the camp. Fitz finds the Servants’ camp in disarray with many of the soldiers dead - having apparently killed each other - and some of the Servants dead and Bee and Shun gone. Ellik and Hogen remain. By subduing and threatening the two men, Fitz learns Ellik agreed to follow the Servants and help them find the Unexpected Son for gold and in hope of regaining his status as heir to the Chalcedean throne. Everything went wrong at the camp when the Servant Dwalia tried to stop the rape of one of her followers. They attacked Dwalia and Vindeliar became distressed. His panic spilled over into the camp, turning soldiers against each other.

When Riddle, Per, Lant, and the soldiers arrive the remaining Chalcedean soldiers are killed. Parties are sent to look for Shun and Bee, but there is no sign of them until they begin the journey back to Buckkeep and come across Shun. She tells them that they had been recaptured by Dwalia and the remaining whites. Bee had been taken to one of the skill pillars and dragged in. Shun would have been dragged in too, if Bee had not bit one of the captors to make him let go of Shun.

One of Nettle's skill coteries goes through the pillar to try to get Bee back, but there is no trace of them on the other side. They are forced to conclude that the group has been lost in the skill pillar, and knowing that those in group did not seem to be too powerful in the skill, assume they were all swept away in the skill current, and Bee was lost forever.

After spending a few months recovering and regaining some of his old skills, Fitz sets off on his journey to Clerres to seek vengeance. He plans to go alone, but as he goes into a skill pillar for the first leg of his journey, both Lant and Per grab onto him and are dragged along too. Shortly after, Spark and the Fool join them, having used dragons blood on the Fool's fingers to go through the pillars. Spark and the Fool also go to Kelsingra so the Fool can resilver his hand from the skill well.

For the next part of the journey, all five of them go to Kelsingra. There, Fitz heals many of the children of the elderlings though he is nearly lost in the skill doing so because of how strong the skill current is in Kelsingra. The fool, as Amber, saves him with her newly skilled hand.

In the last chapter, Bee and her captors emerge from the stone pillar in spring, having been lost inside for months.
