= Cloven Hooves =

1991 fantasy novel by Megan Lindholm

- Author: Megan Lindholm
- Cover artist: Richard Bober
- Genre: Fantasy
- Publisher: Bantam Spectra
- Publication date: 1991
- Publication place: United States
- ISBN: 0-553-29327-3

Cloven Hooves is a 1991 fantasy novel by Megan Lindholm, published in the US by Bantam Spectra. UK and French editions have also been released. The book went out of print in the US, where it was unavailable for nearly thirty years before a Voyager Classics edition was issued in 2019.

== Synopsis ==
The story follows a woman named Evelyn as her imaginary childhood companion, a faun called Pan, makes a real-world appearance in the midst of a crisis in her adult life.

== Reception ==
Critic Don D'Ammassa considered it the best work written under the author's Lindholm byline. In 1992 author Orson Scott Card, writing in The Magazine of Fantasy & Science Fiction, described the story as passionately written and having a quality of "mythic resonance", while finding its structure awkward. He concluded: "you must experience it, if only to feel again the hard, driving pulse of raw storytelling that is so commonly drained out of more traditional, predictable tales". In a review of the French edition, Le Monde described it as "a singular and moving novel that is a magnificent ode to Mother Nature", and as a "major work" of the author. A 1996 reference work was less positive and found the book "at times, quite tedious".

Several reviewers felt that Cloven Hooves was semi-autobiographical, seeing resemblances between Evelyn's childhood in the Alaskan wilderness and the author's own life. Lindholm said she had been frequently asked about this and replied, "No more so than any of my books".
