= Robin Hobb =

American fiction writer (born 1952)

- Hobb at the World Fantasy Convention 2026
- Born: Margaret Astrid Lindholm; March 5, 1952 (age 74); Berkeley, California, U.S.
- Education: University of Denver (no degree)
- Occupation: Writer
- Spouse: Fred Ogden
- Writing career
- Pen name: Robin Hobb, Megan Lindholm
- Period: 1983–present
- Genre: Fantasy fiction
- Notable works: Wizard of the Pigeons (1986); Realm of the Elderlings (1995–2017)
- Website: robinhobb.com meganlindholm.com

Margaret Astrid Lindholm Ogden (née Lindholm; born March 5, 1952), known by her pen names Robin Hobb and Megan Lindholm, is an American writer of speculative fiction. As Hobb, she is best known for her fantasy novels set in the Realm of the Elderlings, which comprise the Farseer, Liveship Traders and Tawny Man trilogies, the Rain Wild Chronicles, and the Fitz and the Fool trilogy. Lindholm's writing includes the urban fantasy novel Wizard of the Pigeons and science fiction short stories, among other works. As of 2018, her fiction has been translated into 22 languages and sold more than 4 million copies.

Born in California, Lindholm grew up in Alaska and the Pacific Northwest and married a mariner at age 18. The Alaskan wilderness and the ocean were prominent aspects of her life, influencing her writing. After an early career in short fiction, at age 30, Lindholm published her first novel while working as a waitress and raising children. The first work to bring her recognition was the 1986 novel Wizard of the Pigeons, a liminal fantasy set in Seattle. A forerunner of the urban fantasy genre, it received praise for Lindholm's depiction of understated magic and poverty. Her science fiction novella "A Touch of Lavender" was nominated for the Hugo and Nebula Awards. While critically well received, Lindholm's work did not sell well; she began writing under the pen name Robin Hobb in 1995.

Hobb achieved commercial success with her debut work under this pseudonym, the Farseer trilogy. An epic fantasy told as a first-person retrospective, it has been described as a character-driven and introspective work. Hobb went on to write four further series set in the Realm of the Elderlings, which received praise from critics for her characterization, and in 2005 The Times described her as "one of the great modern fantasy writers". Through her writing, Hobb explores otherness, ecocentrism, queerness, and gender as themes. She concluded the Elderlings series in 2017 and won the World Fantasy Award—Life Achievement in 2021.

== Early life ==
Margaret Astrid Lindholm was born in Berkeley, California, in 1952; from the age of 10, she grew up in Fairbanks, Alaska. She recalls growing up in the middle of an oil boom in Alaska, which led to a rapid growth in population of the rural town she lived in. A shortage of classroom space caused some of her high school classes to be held on staircases. Lindholm did not like how the town's urbanization intruded on the nature trails around her house, which she had enjoyed exploring, but said her childhood was overall a happy one and described herself as more of a solitary than social child. Her family raised a half wolf called Bruno and hunted caribou and moose; this would later inspire the wolf character Nighteyes and the descriptions of wilderness survival in Lindholm's writing. After graduating from Lathrop High School, she studied at the University of Denver for a year before returning to Alaska.

At 18, Lindholm married Fred Ogden, a merchant mariner; they had been dating for a year. The couple moved to Hawaii; they lived there for more than a year, but found it too hot to acclimate to and returned to Fred's hometown of Kodiak, located at the tip of Kodiak Island in south-central Alaska. Margaret enjoyed journeying on Fred's ships and said the sea was a prominent aspect of her life, inspiring the maritime focus of her Liveship books. She published her first novel at age 30, while working as a waitress; she balanced between writing and caring for her four children while her husband worked offshore as a commercial fisherman. The family experienced financial difficulties at the time and said their income "depended entirely on fish and editors". Margaret described her writing process as: "writing fits into odd corners. It's during the naptime, it's sitting by the bath tub writing, it's writing after the children are in bed". She also worked part-time, including in waitressing and mail delivery, early in her career.

== Writing career ==
Hobb's work has appeared under several pen names: as M. Lindholm and Megan Lindholm from 1979, and as Robin Hobb from 1995. The change from Margaret, her first name, to Megan was due to a misunderstanding with her first editor. Megan Lindholm's writing received critical praise, including Hugo and Nebula Award nominations for her short fiction, but did not sell well. In 1995, the author started writing in a new fantasy subgenre and deliberately chose an androgynous pen name, Robin Hobb, for her new work written as a first-person male narrator. Her writing as Hobb was commercially successful, and has appeared on New York Times bestseller lists. She continues to write under both Hobb and Lindholm bylines.

=== As Megan Lindholm ===
Lindholm sold her first short story to a children's magazine, leading to an early career writing for children. Her short fiction for children appeared in magazines such as Humpty Dumpty, Jack and Jill, and Highlights for Children. She also composed educational material, short works of fiction created to a very specific vocabulary list, which were used in SRA's programmed reading material.

In the 1970s, Lindholm also began to write short fantasy, publishing stories in fanzines such as Space and Time (edited by Gordon Linzner). Her first professional sale as a fantasy writer was the short story "Bones for Dulath", which appeared in the 1979 Amazons! anthology, and which introduced her recurring characters Ki and Vandien. The anthology, published by DAW Books, won a World Fantasy Award for Year's Best Anthology. A second story featuring Ki and Vandien, "The Small One", was published in Fantastic Stories in 1980.

Until 1995, she continued to publish exclusively under the name Megan Lindholm. Her fiction under that name spans several slices of the fantasy genre, from fantasy adventure (the Ki and Vandien tales) to urban fantasy. Her 1986 novel Wizard of the Pigeons was one of the precursors of the urban fantasy genre, and was the first work to bring her wider attention.

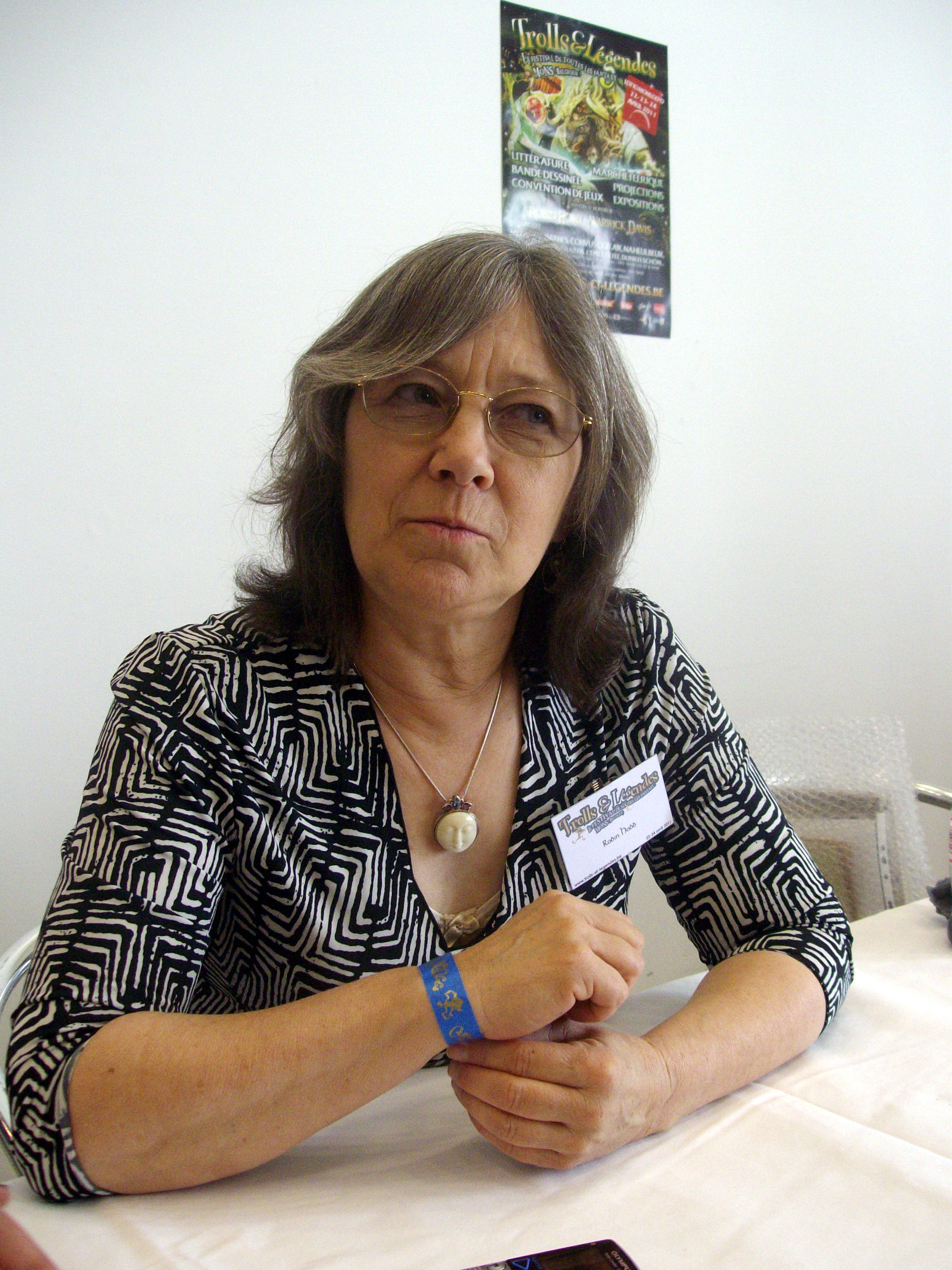
Hobb at the Trolls & Legends festival in Mons, Belgium in April 2011

Lindholm's first novel, Harpy's Flight, was published by Ace in 1983. It was the first of four novels about the characters Ki and Vandien, the last of which was published in 1989. She contributed short stories to a shared world anthology entitled Liavek from 1985 to 1988, and co-wrote a novel, The Gypsy, with Steven Brust. The Gypsy was released both as a traditional paper book and as part of an enhanced multimedia CD which included the text of the novel as well as the Boiled in Lead album Songs From the Gypsy, which was considered the soundtrack to the novel and featured songs written by Brust and his Cats Laughing bandmate Adam Stemple which had inspired the creation of both the novel and the album.

She has continued to publish short stories as Megan Lindholm, including an appearance in the 2013 anthology Year's Best SF 18.

=== As Robin Hobb ===
Robin Hobb, a pseudonym that Lindholm has used for writing works of epic traditional fantasy, first appeared in 1995. Her writing has mainly focused on the Realm of the Elderlings, a series of 16 books written in five parts. The series comprises four trilogies and one tetralogy – the Farseer, the Liveship Traders, the Tawny Man, the Rain Wild, and the Fitz and the Fool – set in the same world.

Hobb's first work was the Farseer trilogy, narrated in first person by FitzChivalry Farseer, illegitimate son of a prince, and featuring an enigmatic character called the Fool. The first volume of the trilogy, Assassin's Apprentice, was published in 1995, followed by Royal Assassin in 1996 and Assassin's Quest in 1997. Hobb next wrote a nautical fantasy series, the Liveship Traders, set in a different part of the Elderlings world and featuring pirates, sea serpents, a family of traders and their living ships. The books of the trilogy, Ship of Magic, The Mad Ship and Ship of Destiny, were published between 1998 and 2000. Over the following three years, Hobb returned to the first-person narrative of Fitz in the Tawny Man trilogy, set after the events of the Liveship novels and comprising Fool's Errand, The Golden Fool, and Fool's Fate. As of 2003, Robin Hobb had sold over one million copies of her first nine novels, which formed three trilogies set in the Realm of the Elderlings.

The three books of the Soldier Son trilogy (Shaman's Crossing, Forest Mage, and Renegade's Magic) are Hobb's only works to be set outside of the Elderlings world; the books were published between 2005 and 2009. In addition, The Inheritance, published in 2011, was a collection of short stories written both as Robin Hobb and as Megan Lindholm.

From 2009 to 2013, Hobb released the four novels of the Rain Wild Chronicles (Dragon Keeper, Dragon Haven, City of Dragons and Blood of Dragons). This series is set in the same world, the Realm of the Elderlings, as Hobb's earlier trilogies. In 2014, Hobb resumed the story, decades later in life, of her two most popular characters in the Fitz and the Fool trilogy, with its three volumes, Fool's Assassin, Fool's Quest and Assassin's Fate, published from 2014 to 2017. The last novel, Assassin's Fate, concludes not only her earlier books featuring Fitz, but also the Liveship and Rain Wild books.

In 2022, she protested against the eviction of Stéphanie Nicot from the festival Les imaginales by publishing a letter of support for Nicot with other authors among whom Floriane Soulas, Silène Edgar, Sylvie Lainé, Ïan Larue, Estelle Faye, Sara Doke, Sylvie Denis, Lucie Chenu, Sarah Buschmann, Charlotte Bousquet and Anne Besson.

== Style and themes ==
=== Genre and style ===
Hobb's writing spans the speculative fiction genre. Her most famous work, the Realm of the Elderlings, is secondary-world fantasy, with the Farseer novels narrated as first-person retrospective. This has been described as an unusual approach in fantasy, with greater focus on the characters' internal conflicts over the external. Her earlier writing as Megan Lindholm comprises short-form science fiction and urban fantasy. Her 1986 novel Wizard of the Pigeons has been cited as a forerunner of the urban fantasy genre, with scholar Farah Mendlesohn describing it as liminal fantasy that pairs "plain descriptions of the fantastic [...] with baroque descriptions of the real". Hobb herself has said that she employs different voices for the two pseudonyms, with Lindholm's voice "a little more snarky, a little more sarcastic, a little less optimistic, less emotional", and more attuned to dark, urban fantasy.

Hobb's novels have sometimes been compared to fellow author George R. R. Martin, with both their best-known works published during the 1990s. While Martin and Hobb's series are considered more realistic than most epic fantasy, they differ in how they depict said realism. According to scholar Sylvia Borowska-Szerszun, Martin's work focuses on the brutality and violence of its realism, while Hobb's narrative focuses more on the individual, and is interested in exploring psychological aspects of trauma. Critic Amanda Craig describes Hobb's writing as having a Shakespearean flavor, and calls the mood "nothing like as bleak as George R R Martin's, nor as Manichean as Tolkien's, but close to Ursula Le Guin's redemptive humanism".

Literary allusions to the works of Robert Louis Stevenson and R. M. Ballantyne have been identified in Hobb's Liveship Traders series, which academics Ralph Crane and Lisa Fletcher described as an immersive portrayal of a world that is water-centric, aided by unique perspectives such as a serpent's-eye view of the ocean (the serpents view the sea as "the Plenty", while the air above is termed "the Lack"). The larger map of the Realm of the Elderlings has been recognized as resembling the U.S. state of Alaska, where Hobb grew up. Scholar Geoffrey B. Elliott views the setting of the Tawny Man trilogy as drawing from the geography and indigenous culture of the Pacific Northwest, noting the glacier-filled isles and matrilineal culture of Hobb's Out Islands.

=== Themes ===
Tolerance for otherness is a theme that runs through the fantasy elements of Hobb's Elderlings series. The books feature two kinds of magic: the socially acceptable Skill, practiced by the ruling class, and the despised Wit, relegated with the lower classes. The Wit, the ability to bond with animals, is viewed as an unnatural inclination, as emasculating and shameful, with its practitioners publicly hanged and forced into hiding. Scholars have described it as an allegory for queerness and homophobia. The protagonist Fitz, who is both Skilled and Witted, leads conflicting identities. His bond with his Witted partner, a wolf, is portrayed as central to his life as his human relationships, but is forced to operate in secret due to social prejudice. This personal struggle, as well as the larger struggle for de-ostracization of the Witted, form a key theme of the series.

Hobb explores gender as a theme in the Liveship Traders, which focuses on the lives of three generations of women in a patriarchal society. The women of the series often defy stereotypical expectations of their femininity: Althea, a rebellious sailor who dresses as a man to work on a ship, re-kindles her sensitive side; Keffria, a submissive housewife, discovers her independence; and Ronica, a conservative, traditional matriarch adapts to social change. The Fool, an enigmatic character whose presentation shifts through the series, appears as a young woman in some sections and as a man in others. Scholars have described this depiction of gender as subversive, and as challenging the notion of a rigid boundary between genders.

Ecological themes have also been identified in Hobb's work. The resurgence of dragons in the Elderlings series poses a challenge to anthropocentrism, or the supremacy of man's place in the world, with humans forced to re-adjust in relation to a stronger, more intelligent predator. The Wit, an ill-regarded ability associated with the animal world, is shown through Fitz's perspective as a natural extension of the senses and as an interconnectedness to all living things. Scholar Mariah Larsson view the series as ecocentric in nature, questioning the intrinsic value of human over other forms of life.

Other themes in Hobb's writing include critiques of colonialism and examination of culture-specific honor systems in the Soldier Son trilogy, a series set in a post-colonial secondary world that has drawn resemblance to the 19th century American frontier.

== Reception ==
Lindholm's work did not sell well, causing her to remain a midlist author for several years. Her works as Hobb have been commercially successful: the first three sub-series of the Realm of the Elderlings had sold more than a million copies by 2003, and at the time of the series' conclusion in 2017, more than 1.25 million copies had been sold in the UK alone. As of 2018, Hobb's fiction has been translated into 22 languages and sold more than 4 million copies in France. Following her success as Hobb, her Lindholm works such as Wizard of the Pigeons and Alien Earth were translated to French, and Cloven Hooves, which had been out of print for more than two decades, was reprinted in the US.

Hobb has received recognition for her characterization. In a column for The Times, critic Amanda Craig called Hobb "one of the great modern fantasy writers". She described Hobb's characters as believable people who "age, change, waver and suffer lasting scars", and highlighted the portrayal of Fitz, the protagonist of the Farseer trilogy. The New Statesman remarked on the "striking portraits of three generations of women" in the sequel Liveship Traders trilogy, and stated that though Hobb's works had a medieval setting, her themes resonated in the modern world. In a review of the first book of the Fitz and the Fool trilogy, The Telegraph said of her characters that "their longings and failings are our own, and we find our view of the world indelibly changed by their experiences". Comparing her writing with that of literary novelists, The Telegraph described Hobb's novels as transcending the fantasy genre. The Los Angeles Review of Books found Hobb's characters in the final trilogy interesting even in middle age, writing that traumas experienced in childhood "linger and take on new shapes" as her characters aged. The LARB described the psychological complexity of Hobb's characters, along with the layered interactions between them, as central to the appeal of her writing. In a similar view, Library Journal described the Elderlings series as "masterworks of character-based epic fantasy".

Some of Hobb's works have received less positive a reception: The Guardian criticized the Soldier Son books as lacking the "heart and page-turning spark" of her Fitz novels, and viewed the Rain Wild novels as "flimsy in comparison". Scholar Lenise Prater positively viewed how Hobb's Elderlings novels blurred gender boundaries; she however critiqued Hobb's emphasis on "monogamous, romantic love", viewing it as heteronormative and as a conservative representation of queer relationships. A different view was offered by scholar Peter Melville, who described the final Elderlings trilogy as "confirm[ing] the series' place within the larger history of queerness in the fantasy genre".

As Megan Lindholm, she has received praise for the depiction of understated magic, poverty and mental illness in the novel Wizard of the Pigeons and other themes such as aging in her short fiction. Other aspects of Hobb's writing that have drawn commentary include her prose, described by The Times as having "a sinewy simplicity close to that of myths and fairytales", her portrayal of gender as a theme, in particular through the ambiguity of the character known as the Fool, and her depiction of psychological aspects of trauma, including that arising from violence and rape. Fellow authors of speculative fiction have praised Hobb's work. Orson Scott Card stated that she "arguably set the standard for the modern serious fantasy novel", and cited the Liveship Traders as his favorite work of Hobb's. George R.R. Martin has praised her work, writing that her books are like "diamonds in a sea of zircons". In 2014, Hobb was a Guest of Honor at the 72nd World Science Fiction Convention in London.

== Awards ==
In 1981, Megan Lindholm was awarded an Alaska State Council of the Arts prize for her short story "The Poaching". As Megan Lindholm, her short fiction works have been finalists for both the Nebula and the Hugo awards, and winner of the Asimov's Readers Award. In 2021, Lindholm won the World Fantasy Award for Life Achievement, presented to individuals who have demonstrated outstanding service to the fantasy field.

Awards and nominations
Award	Category	Year	Work	Result	Ref.
British Fantasy Award	Novel	1997	Assassin's Apprentice	Nominated	
David Gemmell Award	Novel	2018	Assassin's Fate	Won	
Endeavour Award	Novel	1999	Ship of Magic	Nominated	
Endeavour Award	Novel	2000	The Mad Ship	Nominated	
Endeavour Award	Novel	2007	Forest Mage	Won	
Geffen Award	Fantasy Novel	2016	Fool's Assassin	Won	
Geffen Award	Fantasy Novel	2018	Fool's Quest	Won	
Hugo Award	Novella	1990	"A Touch of Lavender"	Nominated	
Inkpot Award		2017	Robin Hobb	Won	
Locus Award	Fantasy Novel	1997	Royal Assassin	Nominated	
Locus Award	Fantasy Novel	1998	Assassin's Quest	Nominated	
Nebula Award	Novella	1990	"A Touch of Lavender"	Nominated	
Nebula Award	Novelette	1990	"Silver Lady and the Fortyish Man"	Nominated	
Nebula Award	Short Story	2003	"Cut"	Nominated	
Prix Imaginales (Note: Hobb received the Prix Imaginales, an award for fantasy published in France, for the French editions of Wizard of the Pigeons (Le Dernier magicien), Shaman's Crossing (La Déchirure et le cavalier rêveur) and "Homecoming" ("Retour au pays").)	Novel	2004	Wizard of the Pigeons	Won	
Prix Imaginales	Foreign Novel	2007	Shaman's Crossing	Won	
Prix Imaginales	Short Story	2006	"Homecoming"	Won	
World Fantasy Award	Life Achievement	2021	Megan Lindholm	Won	

== Personal life ==
She currently publishes under both her pen names, and lives on a small farm outside of Roy, Washington.

== Sources ==
- Blaschke, Jayme Lynn (2005). Voices of Vision: Creators of Science Fiction and Fantasy Speak. University of Nebraska Press. ISBN 978-0-8032-6239-3.
- Borowska-Szerszun, Sylvia (2019). "Representation of Rape in George R. R. Martin's A Song of Ice and Fire and Robin Hobb's Liveship Traders". Extrapolation. 60 (1): 1–22. doi:10.3828/extr.2019.2. S2CID 166766551. ProQuest 2222490097.
- Carroll, Siobhan (2007). "Honor-bound: Self and Other in the Honor Culture of Robin Hobb's Soldier Son Series". Journal of the Fantastic in the Arts. 18 (3): 308–318. JSTOR 24351005.
- Crane, Ralph; Fletcher, Lisa (2017). "An Imaginary Water World: Robin Hobb's The Liveship Traders Trilogy". Island Genres, Genre Islands: Conceptualisation and Representation in Popular Fiction. Rowman & Littlefield International. ISBN 978-1-78348-207-8.
- D'Ammassa, Don (2006). Encyclopedia of Fantasy and Horror Fiction. Infobase Publishing. ISBN 978-0-8160-6192-1.
- Elliott, Geoffrey B. (2006). "Shades of Steel-Gray: The Nuanced Warrior-Hero in the Farseer Trilogy". Studies in Fantasy Literature. 4: 70–78. OCLC 133466088.
- Elliott, Geoffrey B. (2015). "Moving beyond Tolkien's Medievalism: Robin Hobb's Farseer and Tawny Man Trilogies". In Young, Helen (ed.). Fantasy and Science Fiction Medievalisms: From Isaac Asimov to A Game of Thrones. Cambria Press. ISBN 978-1-62499-883-6.
- Larsson, Mariah (2021). "Bringing Dragons Back into the World: Dismantling the Anthropocene in Robin Hobb's The Realm of the Elderlings". In Höglund, Anna; Trenter, Cecilia (eds.). The Enduring Fantastic: Essays on Imagination and Western Culture. McFarland. ISBN 978-1-4766-8012-5.
- Melville, Peter (2018). "Queerness and Homophobia in Robin Hobb's Farseer Trilogies". Extrapolation. 59 (3): 281–303. doi:10.3828/extr.2018.17. ProQuest 2156322163.
- Mendlesohn, Farah (2013). Rhetorics of Fantasy. Wesleyan University Press. ISBN 978-0-8195-7391-9.
- Prater, Lenise (2016). "Queering Magic: Robin Hobb and Fantasy Literature's Radical Potential". In Roberts, Jude; MacCallum-Stewart, Esther (eds.). Gender and Sexuality in Contemporary Popular Fantasy: Beyond Boy Wizards and Kick-Ass Chicks. Routledge. doi:10.4324/9781315583938. ISBN 978-1-317-13054-3.
- Rennison, Nick; Andrews, Stephen E. (2009). 100 Must-Read Fantasy Novels. Bloomsbury. ISBN 978-1-4081-3607-2.
- Storm, Sue (1996). "The Windsinger Series". In Shippey, T. A. (ed.). Magill's Guide to Science Fiction and Fantasy Literature. Salem Press. ISBN 978-0-89356-907-5.
- Young, Helen (2014). "Critiques of Colonialism in Robin Hobb's Soldier Son Trilogy". Extrapolation. 55 (1): 33–50. doi:10.3828/extr.2014.4. ProQuest 1522791672.
