= Assassin's Fate =

2017 book by Robin Hobb

- First edition (UK)
- Author: Robin Hobb
- Cover artist: Jackie Morris
- Language: English
- Series: Fitz and the Fool Trilogy
- Genre: Fantasy novel
- Publisher: Voyager Books (UK); Del Rey Books
- Publication date: 4 May 2017
- Publication place: United States
- Media type: Hardcover, Ebook
- ISBN: 978-0-553-39295-1
- Preceded by: Fool's Quest

Assassin's Fate is the third book in the epic fantasy trilogy Fitz and the Fool, written by American author Robin Hobb. It continues the story of FitzChivalry Farseer and his daughter Bee after the events of Fool's Quest, published in 2015.

== Plot summary ==
Bee fights furiously with her captors as they struggle to bring her the long distance back to Clerres, and Bee slowly comes to understand her own ability with the Skill. When Dwalia and Vindeliar finally succeed in bringing her to Clerres Castle, the Four who rule there punish Dwalia severely for her many failures. Bee hides her abilities and pretends to be a frail little girl who does not have prophetic dreams. When Symphe (one of the ruling Four) brings Bee to one of the lower cells in the castle, where prisoners are held for torture, Bee recognizes her danger. When Symphe asks her to bring an oil lantern closer, Bee throws the lantern, splashing oil onto Symphe, whose clothes quickly catch fire. While Symphe is distracted, Bee makes use of a broken glass vial, which she uses to slit Symphe's throat. The broken glass vial contained sea serpent essence, and when Bee touches the essence, it supercharges her Skill ability. She tells Dwalia to die, and Dwalia does. Bee quietly returns to her cell and pretends that she had been there the whole time.

Fitz, the Fool, Per, Spark, and Lant arrive at Clerres on the liveship Paragon. The Fool tricks the team into waiting until the beginning of the next day while he slips into the castle that night. The Fool manages to kill a few guards in the Servants' castle, but then is caught and sent to the dungeons. With Symphe's death the castle gates are now closed and Fitz, with the rest of the team, have no way into the castle. However, Bee manages to slip them a cryptic message that "The way out is a way in," by which Fitz realizes that she is telling them to try entering the castle through its sewage tunnel. The team makes the disgusting trip through the tunnel and emerge into bowels of the castle, where they find and release the Fool. They next go in search of Bee.

Meanwhile, Bee has decided to take the keys she stole from Symphe and escape from her cell before anyone comes again, since she feels they will come to kill her. She slips into the huge castle library and begins dumping oil lamps one after another onto the floor, where she has thrown many of the books and scrolls. When she sets flame to the oil, the entire library quickly erupts, and she tries to find a way to escape the smoke. By chance she runs into Fitz' team, and they retrace their steps towards the dungeon, where they believe there is a secret passage out. As the castle burns above them, they rush to destroy the wall blocking the passage, and the castle begins to come down around them. Fitz is caught with his legs trapped by falling debris; the others are forced to go on without him, thinking Fitz had died.

After they leave, a vial of Silver explodes and coats much of Fitz, healing his immediate wounds and giving him a means of cutting the debris trapping him. By the time he escapes, the team members have all left with Bee. Dragons have reduced the castle and nearby city to ruins. Fitz uses his now-ferocious Skill ability to convince a ship captain to take him to the mainland, where he finds a Skill pillar in an attempt to go home. The Skill-pillar, however, takes him to the quarry near Kelsingra. Fitz slowly comes to realize that he is dying, and that he cannot return to Buckkeep. At Clerres castle, when he was attacked by the castle guards, he was hit by several darts, and he now realizes that these must have contained the parasites that eat away at people from the inside. So, he begins to carve a wolf for himself from the stone in the quarry, just as Verity carved a dragon, to contain his memories. While he works at it, the people at Buckkeep learn of him and arrive at the quarry to be with him in his final days.

The Fool helps Fitz complete his wolf by putting his own memories into the stone as well. They both disappear into the stone wolf, which then awakens and goes off into the forest to hunt.
