= Shaman's Crossing =

2005 novel by Robin Hobb

- First UK edition cover by John Howe (www.john-howe.com)
- Author: Robin Hobb
- Cover artist: John Howe (UK)
- Language: English
- Series: Soldier Son Trilogy
- Genre: Fantasy
- Publisher: Voyager Books (UK) & EOS (US)
- Publication date: 4 July 2005 (UK) & September 2005 (US)
- Publication place: United States
- Media type: Print (hardback & paperback)
- Pages: 400 (hardback edition) & 544 (paperback edition)
- ISBN: 0-00-719612-1 (UK hardback edition)
- OCLC: 62264166
- Followed by: Forest Mage

Shaman's Crossing is a fantasy novel by American writer Robin Hobb, the first in her Soldier Son Trilogy. It is written in first-person narrative from the viewpoint of Nevare Burvelle and follows his life through his first year in the King's Cavalla Academy.

== Plot summary ==
Young Nevare Burvelle is the second son of a second son in the fantasy nation of Gernia. According to Gernian religious practice, firstborn noble sons are heir to the family fortunes, second sons bear swords as soldiers, and third sons are consecrated to the priesthood. Holy Writ specifies other roles as well for subsequent sons. Nevare will follow his father – newly made a lord by the King – into the Cavalla (cavalry); to the frontier and thence to an advantageous marriage to carry on the Burvelle name. It is a golden future, and Nevare looks forward to it with relish. From the age of eight, Nevare is schooled daily in math, physics, engineering, and of course combat and military strategy. With the help of Sergeant Duril, a man who once served under Nevare's father, he learns to live off the land and survive in the harsh plains environment.

For twenty years King Troven's cavalla have pushed the frontiers of Gernia out across the grasslands by building King's Road, Troven's vision of future trade with the east, and also subduing the fierce tribes of the plain on its way. Now they have driven the frontier as far as the Barrier Mountains, home to the enigmatic Speck people. The specks – a light sensitive, dapple-skinned, forest-dwelling folk – are said to retain vestiges of magic in a world which is becoming progressive and technologised. The 'civilised' peoples base their convictions on a rational philosophy founded on their belief in the good god, who displaced the older deities of their world. To them, the Specks are primeval savages, little better than beasts. Superstitions abound; it is said that they harbour strange diseases and worship trees. Sexual congress with them is regarded as both filthy and foolhardy, though not unheard of; the Speck plague, which has ravaged the frontier, has decimated entire regiments.

During Nevare's youth, his father hires a man named Dewara, a plainsman of the Kidona tribe and a former enemy of Lord Burvelle, to teach Nevare things he cannot learn from a friendly tutor. After a grueling set of lessons, Dewara offers Nevare the chance to "become a Kidona" by participating in a ritual and killing an enemy of the Kidona. During the ritual, Dewara places a dried poisonous toad in Nevare's mouth and Nevare experiences a vision. The vision involves Nevare crossing a strangely constructed series of bridges and culminates in a meeting with Tree Woman. Dewara urges Nevare to kill her, because she is the enemy. However, Nevare falls off the final bridge and only with Tree Woman's aid can he survive. He accepts her assistance and as payment, she claims him as her weapon to halt the destruction of her people.

Nevare awakens at his father's house, nearly dead from beating and exposure and missing a patch of hair and skin from his scalp.

Soon after his 18th birthday, Nevare heads to the King's Cavalla Academy to begin his formal training. His upbringing and tutors' lessons serve him well at the Academy, but his progress there is not as simple as he would wish. He experiences prejudice from the old aristocracy; as the son of a 'new noble' he is segregated into a patrol comprising other new nobles' sons, all of whom will encounter injustice, discrimination and foul play in that hostile and deeply competitive environment. In addition, his world view will be challenged by his unconventional girl-cousin Epiny; and by the bizarre dreams which visit him at night. And then, on Dark Evening, the carnival comes to Old Thares, bringing with it the first Specks Nevare has ever seen...

This first contact proves to be a dramatic one, as the other self of Nevare comes to the fore and instructs the Specks to do the "dust dance". This dance, which consists of the dancers showering the on-lookers with dust, results in a widespread Speck plague both in the Academy of the cavalla and in Old Thares. Seized by a fever, Nevare finds himself once again crossing the bridge sealed by his own sword during the ritual set up by Dewara. He is not alone however, as he finds himself with what appears to be ghostly forms of all the people dying from the plague, including notably Caulder, and Spink. He does not end his crossing, as he is expelled from that realm, as Tree woman still needs him in the physical world.

Joined by Epiny in the infirmary, Nevare finds Spink dying next to him. Aided by his cousin, he journeys once more to the bridge in what ends up to be a climactic battle between him, his other self and the Tree woman. Despite the odds stacked against him, he manages to turn the tide of the battle by retrieving his sword, the "iron magic of his people". The bridge disappears and Nevare manages to slash the Tree woman, allowing Epiny to save his friend, before being once more expelled.

Nevare eventually recovers and this part of the story ends as he finds himself returning to the Academy.
