= Liveship Traders =

Trilogy of fantasy novels by Robin Hobb

- UK edition
- Ship of Magic; The Mad Ship; Ship of Destiny
- Author: Robin Hobb
- Cover artist: John Howe, Stephen Youll
- Country: United Kingdom, United States
- Language: English
- Genre: Fantasy
- Publisher: Voyager (UK), Spectra (US)
- Published: 1998–2000
- Media type: Print (hardback & paperback)
- Preceded by: Farseer trilogy
- Followed by: Tawny Man trilogy

The Liveship Traders is a trilogy of fantasy novels by American author Robin Hobb. A nautical fantasy series, the Liveship Traders is the second trilogy set in the Realm of the Elderlings and features pirates, sea serpents, a family of traders and their living ships. Several critics regard it as Hobb's best work.

== Publication ==
The first volume of the trilogy, Ship of Magic, was published in March 1998 by HarperCollins Voyager in the UK, and simultaneously in the US by Bantam Spectra. The second book followed in March 1999 in the UK, where it was titled The Mad Ship; a US edition titled Mad Ship followed one month later. The concluding volume, Ship of Destiny, was released in March 2000 in the UK and in August 2000 in the US. The series was stylized as The Liveship Traders, and also as the Liveship Traders. All the first editions were hardcovers: the UK covers were illustrated by John Howe, while the US versions were designed by Stephen Youll.

== Plot overview ==
The Liveship Trader's Trilogy takes place in Jamaillia, Bingtown and the Pirate Isles, on the coast far to the south of the Six Duchies. The war in the north has interrupted the trade that is the lifeblood of Bingtown, and the Liveship Traders have fallen on hard times despite their magic sentient ships. At one time, possession of a Liveship, constructed of magical wizardwood, guaranteed a Trader's family prosperity. Only a Liveship can brave the dangers of the Rain Wild River and trade with the legendary Rain Wild Traders and their mysterious magical goods, plundered from the enigmatic Elderling ruins. Althea Vestrit expects her families to adhere to tradition, and pass the family Liveship on to her when it quickens at the death of her father. Instead, the Vivacia goes to her sister Keffria and her scheming Chalcedean husband Kyle. The proud Liveship becomes a transport vessel for the despised but highly profitable slave trade.

Althea, cast out on her own, resolves to make her own way in the world and regain control of her family's living ship. Her old shipmate Brashen Trell, the enigmatic woodcarver Amber and the Paragon, the notorious mad Liveship are the only allies she can rally to her cause. Pirates, a slave rebellion, migrating sea serpents and a newly hatched dragon are but a few of the obstacles she must face on her way to discovering the true nature of Liveships.

== Style ==
Literary allusions to the works of Robert Louis Stevenson and R. M. Ballantyne have been identified in the Liveship Traders series. Academics Ralph Crane and Lisa Fletcher describe the trilogy as an immersive portrayal of a world that is water-centric, aided by unique perspectives such as a serpent's-eye view of the ocean: for instance, the serpents view the sea as "the Plenty", while the air above is termed "the Lack". Hobb's writing in the Liveship Traders novels has sometimes been compared to fellow author George R. R. Martin's works, with both their best-known works published during the late 1990s. While their series are considered more realistic than most epic fantasy, they differ in how they depict said realism. According to scholar Sylvia Borowska-Szerszun, Martin's work focuses on the brutality and violence of its realism, while Hobb's narrative focuses more on the psychological aspects of trauma, including that arising from violence and rape.

== Themes ==
Hobb explores gender as a theme in the Liveship Traders, which features the lives of three generations of women in a patriarchal society. The women of the series often defy stereotypical expectations of their femininity: the rebellious sailor Althea Vestrit, who dresses as a man to work on a ship, re-kindles her sensitive side; the submissive housewife Keffria discovers her independence; and the conservative, traditional matriarch Ronica adapts to social change.

In Ship of Destiny, the character known as Amber carves a liveship's figurehead in the likeness of FitzChivalry Farseer, thus revealing herself as the Fool from the Farseer trilogy. An enigmatic character whose presentation shifts through the Elderlings series, Amber/the Fool appears as a woman in some books and as a man in others. Scholars have described this portrayal of gender as subversive, and as challenging notions of rigid boundaries between genders. The New Statesman wrote that Hobb explored themes including slavery, political upheaval and gender equality, and said that despite its medieval setting, the series' themes echoed in the modern world.

== Reception ==
Describing the Liveship Traders as his favorite work by Hobb, author Orson Scott Card felt that she "arguably set the standard for the modern serious fantasy novel". A similar sentiment was expressed by Booklist, who regarded the series as "probably the best fantasy trilogy of the past decade and a prospective fantasy classic", and Publishers Weekly likewise held that it was "one of the finest fantasy sagas to bridge the millennium". In a survey of Hobb's writing under both pseudonyms up to 2006, critic Don D'Ammassa called the Liveship Traders "certainly her best work to date", and The Weekend Australian echoed this view in 2009.

Praise was directed at Hobb's construction and development of characters over the course of the series. Interzone's Chris Gilmore lauded how Hobb's characters "come alive" with a mix of strengths and human flaws, in a way that made the reader "care for them", even the wooden liveships. He praised the conflict between Kennit and his mate in Ship of Magic as "the finest aspect of an exceptional book". Strange Horizons's Stephanie Dray similarly wrote that Kennit was "one of the most captivating villains of all time". Remarking on the "striking portraits of three generations of women" in the Liveship Traders, the New Statesman wrote that Hobb's novels did not ignore women's stories. Dray also praised Hobb's characterization of women, and described the series as "revolutionary nautical fantasy".

The plot of the trilogy was described by D'Ammassa as "engaging and exciting" due to the way it explored the "ramifications of the setting". Gilmore felt that the first book's "complex but tightly controlled" plot was driven by the character's motivations in a way that made it highly believable. He however found the ending abrupt and summed up the first book as "rich, complex, unfinished". In a more negative review, Kirkus faulted Hobb for yielding to "Doorstopper Syndrome"; they also felt Ship of Magic failed due to "bloat, irresolution, logorrhea, and brake failure". Kirkus went on to criticize the second book as having "cast aside any remaining inclination toward control", while Gilmore conversely found it constructed with "exceptional skill, deployed on a grand scale but without longueurs".

== Sources ==
- Borowska-Szerszun, Sylvia (2019). "Representation of Rape in George R. R. Martin's A Song of Ice and Fire and Robin Hobb's Liveship Traders". Extrapolation. 60 (1): 1–22. doi:10.3828/extr.2019.2. S2CID 166766551.
- Crane, Ralph; Fletcher, Lisa (2017). "An Imaginary Water World: Robin Hobb's The Liveship Traders Trilogy". Island Genres, Genre Islands: Conceptualisation and Representation in Popular Fiction. Rowman & Littlefield International. ISBN 978-1-78348-207-8.
- D'Ammassa, Don (2006). Encyclopedia of Fantasy and Horror Fiction. Infobase Publishing. ISBN 978-0-8160-6192-1.
- Larsson, Mariah (2021). "Bringing Dragons Back into the World: Dismantling the Anthropocene in Robin Hobb's The Realm of the Elderlings". In Höglund, Anna; Trenter, Cecilia (eds.). The Enduring Fantastic: Essays on Imagination and Western Culture. McFarland. ISBN 978-1-4766-8012-5.
- Melville, Peter (2018). "Queerness and Homophobia in Robin Hobb's Farseer Trilogies". Extrapolation. 59 (3): 281–303. doi:10.3828/extr.2018.17.
- Prater, Lenise (2016). "Queering Magic: Robin Hobb and Fantasy Literature's Radical Potential". In Roberts, Jude; MacCallum-Stewart, Esther (eds.). Gender and Sexuality in Contemporary Popular Fantasy: Beyond Boy Wizards and Kick-Ass Chicks. Routledge. ISBN 978-1-317-13054-3.
