= Alexei Kondratiev =

American author, linguist, and teacher of Celtic languages, folklore and culture

Alexei Kondratiev (February 15, 1949–May 28, 2010) was an American author, linguist, and teacher of Celtic languages, folklore and culture. He taught the Irish language and Celtic history at the Irish Arts Center in Manhattan, New York from 1985 until his death on May 28, 2010. Nine editions of his book, The Apple Branch, were published in English and Spanish from 1998 to 2004. At various times, he taught all six of the living Celtic languages.

A long-time member of the Mythopoeic Society, Kondratiev was the Scholar Guest of Honor at the organization's Mythcon 33 convention in 2002, papers coordinator for Mythcon 39 in 2008, and maintained a book review column in its publication, Mythlore. In 2010, the society named a new award after Kondratiev, the Alexei Kondratiev Memorial Student Paper Award, to be presented for the first time at its Mythcon 41 convention in Dallas, July 9–12, 2010.

He contributed significant portions of the text used on the website of the Celtic League's American Branch and book reviews for the organization's magazine, Keltoi.

On the File 770 science fiction fandom blog, Ken Gale reported that Kondratiev "spoke over 60 languages and was fluent in 13 to 20 of them". In the Northeast Tolkien Society's tribute to Kondratiev, co-chairs Anthony S. Burdge and Jessica J. Burke reminisced about how he offered advice on the pronunciation of key Algonquian terms for a paper at Mythcon 37 in 2006, and his passion for the Polynesian culture and language at the Hawaii Mythcon.

Kondratiev encouraged students to think of language as a tool to connect with and understand the culture of its people. The collection of languages he acquired included the Native American languages of Cherokee, Lenape, Lakota, and Navajo.

== Early years ==
Born on February 14, 1949 in New York, son of a Russian father and French mother, Kondratiev became fluent in the languages spoken by his parents: Russian, French and English. English was the later of these three languages; he did not speak it until he started school in New York. He was the eldest of six children, with four sisters and one brother.

Kondratiev grew up in both New York City and Bourgogne, France, as he traveled back and forth between the home of his parents in New York City and his grandparents' home in the Saone Valley. His interest in the Celtic culture began as a child, exploring the ancient Celtic ruins near his grandparents' home in eastern France. He began learning the Irish language from library books.

In the 1960s, Kondratiev studied the Celtic languages and culture while traveling through Brittany, Wales, Ireland and Scotland. He lived for a while among native speakers of the Irish language on Inishmaan, the middle island of the Aran Islands group, where he acquired fluency in Irish Gaelic. During that period, the Aran Islands were still home to elderly Gaeilge monoglots.

=== Education ===
A graduate of New York's Columbia University (anthropology and linguistics), Kondratiev also studied Celtic philology at the Ecole des Hautes Etudes in Paris. His studies at both schools included archaeology. During the 1970s, he took music courses at the Mannes College in New York.

== Neopagan community ==
A frequent participant and occasional speaker at science fiction conventions, Kondratiev met Judy Harrow at a science fiction convention in the early 1980s. During an interview at the Etheracon convention in Poughkpeepsie in January 1993, Kondratiev commented about how Harrow practiced a "heretic" form of Gardnerian Wicca. He attributed his gradual attraction to Neopaganism in the 1980s to his contact with science fiction fans who had become Neopagans. When he met Harrow, Kondratiev still considered himself a Christian, and continued to identify himself as such throughout the 1980s while attending Neopagan religious ceremonies.

=== "Children of Memory" ===
Although he did not join Harrow's Proteus Coven, Kondratiev was initiated into the "Proteus tradition" by Night Rainbow. After his initiation, he joined Mnemosynides Coven. This group was founded by Len Rosenberg (known in the Neopagan community as "Black Lotus") with Erich Heinemann ("Ophion") in 1988. Mnemosynides, which means "Children of Memory," was named after the titaness of Greek mythology, Mnemosyne. Mnemosynides Coven belonged to the Protean-Gardnerian tradition of Wicca, which originated with Judy Harrow's Proteus Coven. Kondratiev remained a member of Mnemosynides, and a Christian, until his death in 2010.

At the time of his death, Kondratiev had been high priest of Mnemosynides for more than 20 years. In her "Memoriam" to the group's former high priest, published by Circle Sanctuary, Mnemosynides high priestess Lisa Bodo explained how he taught her the importance of "the bridge between Celtic Paganism and early Celtic Christianity." He did not consider his Neopagan and Christian beliefs to be in conflict and never renounced his Christianity.

=== Guest speaker and teacher ===
His knowledge of Celtic mythology and language made Kondratiev a frequent guest speaker at conventions, conferences and retreats, especially events with an emphasis on magic, Neopaganism or Wicca. He taught classes and served as program director for the Esotericon convention (which focused on science fiction, fantasy, magick and Neopaganism) in New Jersey from 1985 until 1991, when the convention discontinued. Then he served as a guest speaker for Etheracon, a similar convention which was started in Poughkeepsie, New York in 1992. In more recent years, Kondratiev has been a guest at the Sacred Space and Ecumenicon conferences in Maryland, and the CWPN Harvest Gathering in Connecticut. As a featured guest at the Chesapeake Pagan Summer Gathering (Maryland) in 2008, he recited 108 names of the Hindu goddess, Kali, at a puja led by Len Rosenberg.

== Bird watcher ==
His friends remember Kondratiev as an avid bird watcher. Queens was one of his favorite locations for studying birds, as well as a center for cultural diversity. He commented that over 100 different species of birds could be observed in a single day while walking through the park in Queens. Birds and animals are one of the interests Alexei Kondratiev had for all of his life.

== Bibliography ==
=== Books ===
- Devoted to You: Honoring Deity In Wiccan Practice. Co-authored with Judy Harrow, Geoffrey W. Miller, and Marueen Reddington-Wilde. Kensington Publishing Corp. (2003). ISBN 0-8065-2392-1.
- Celtic Rituals: A Guide to Ancient Celtic Spirituality. Scotland: New Celtic Pub. (1999). ISBN 1-902012-18-6.
- The Apple Branch: A Path to Celtic Ritual. Cork, Ireland: The Collins Press (1998). American edition: Citadel Press (2003). ISBN 0-8065-2502-9.
- Learning the Celtic languages: a resource guide for the student of Irish, Welsh, Scottish Gaelic, Breton, Manx, or Cornish. Co-authored with Liam O Caiside. New York: Celtic League American Branch (1991).

=== Comic books ===
- Dangerous Times, Featuring Beleagean Days and Vidorix the Druid, Evolution Comics (1989). A series of six comic books, with Vidorix the Druid by Alexei Kondratiev and Beleagean Days by Margie Spears. Artwork for Vidorix the Druid was by Jim Fletcher, Don Hudson, Jordan Raskin and Sandu Florea. The series of six comic books published under the trade name, Evolution Comics, by Ken Gale and Mercy Van Vlack in 1989, is unrelated to a comic book publisher with the same trade name founded by Nicholas Ahlhelm in 2007. Cover art for volume 1 of the series was by Michael Kaluta.

=== Significant articles and papers ===
- "Samhain: Season of Death and Renewal". An Tríbhís Mhór: The IMBAS Journal of Celtic Reconstructionism, volume 2, issue 1/2, Samhain 1997, Iombolg 1998.
- "Basic Celtic Deity Types". IMBAS website. Retrieved 2010-06-01.
- "Thou Shalt Not Suffer a Witch to Live: an Enquiry into Biblical Mistranslation." Enchante, Number 18 (1994). pp. 11–15.

=== Contributions to periodicals ===
Alexei Kondratiev also contributed articles about folklore, mythology and Celtic culture to the following publications.

- Mythlore. Semi-annual journal of the Mythopoeic Society.
- Mythprint. Monthly bulletin of the Mythopoeic Society.
- Keltoi. Magazine published by the Celtic League American Branch.
- CARN. Quarterly magazine of the International Celtic League.
- Keltria: A Journal of Druidism and Keltic Magick. Quarterly publication by the Henge of Keltria, an organization of modern Druids.
- Six Nations, One Soul. Quarterly newsletter of the Celtic League American Branch.
- Butterbur's Woodshed. Mythopoeic Society's discussion group.

=== Radio show guest ===
- Nuff Said!, a radio show devoted to comic books and related subjects, produced by Ken Gale for WBAI radio. Alexei Kondratiev was a guest on five of the show's broadcasts from 1993 to 2002, speaking on the subjects of comic books, Celtic culture, mythology, history, and works of J. R. R. Tolkien. Notes in the show's archives for February 5, 2002, when Kondratiev talked about Tolkien, claimed that he could also speak Elvish, but did not identify which of the Elvish languages fabricated from Tolkien's stories.
- Moorish Orthodox Radio Crusade, a radio show about radical environmentalism, produced by Bill Weinberg for WBAI radio. Kondradiev was an occasional guest of the show, talking about the works of J. R. R. Tolkien.
- "Eco-Logic," a radio show on environmental issues, produced for WBAI-FM by Ken Gale. Alexei was on the Dec. 29, 2009 episode speaking on "Natural Cycles."
