= Extrapolation (journal) =

Academic journal

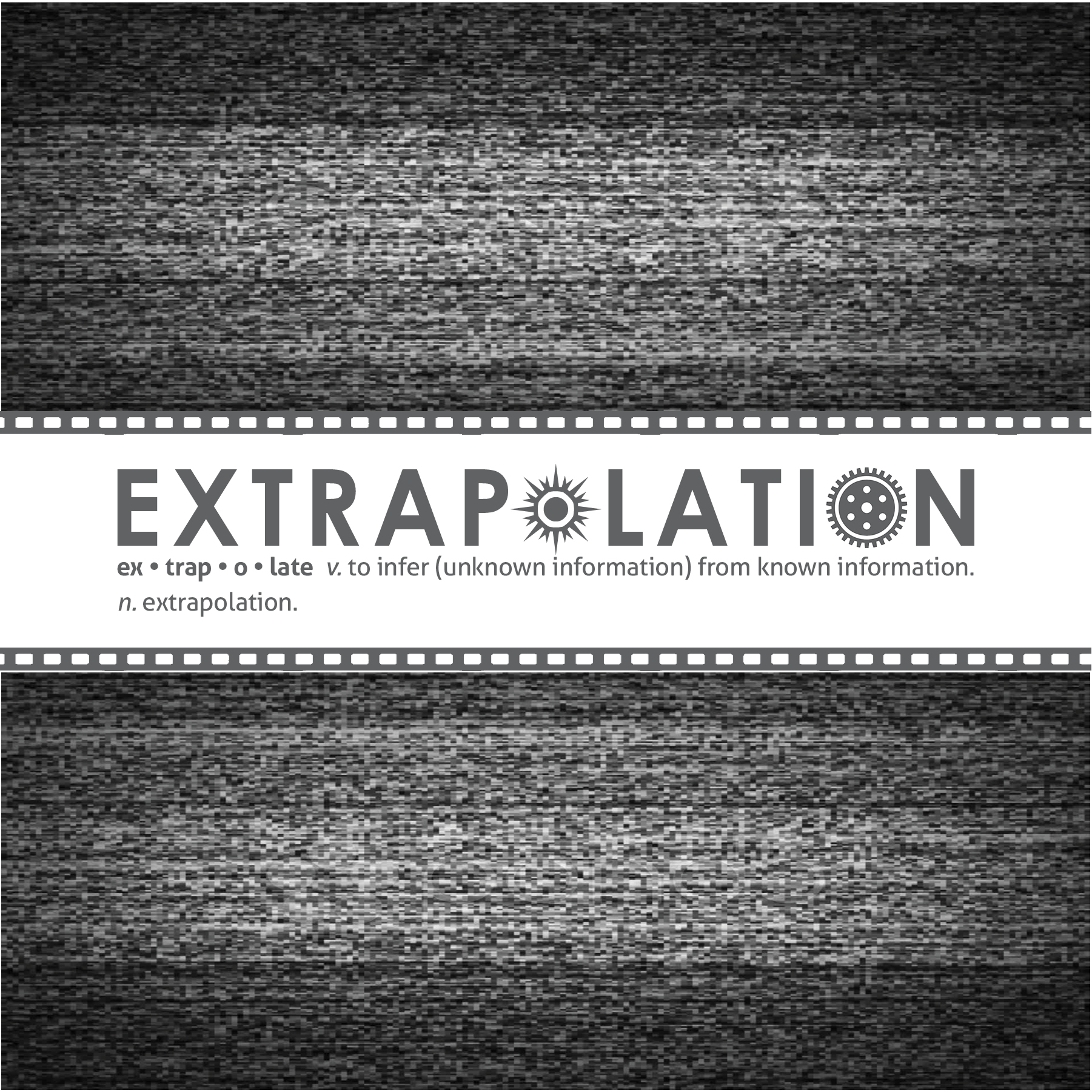
- Discipline: Speculative fiction
- Language: English
- Edited by: Javier A. Martinez, Andrew M. Butler, Michael Levy, Wendy Pearson, John Rieder

Publication details
- History: 1959–present
- Publisher: Liverpool University Press
- Frequency: Triannual

Standard abbreviations
- ISO 4: Extrapolation

Indexing
- ISSN: 0014-5483 (print); 2047-7708 (web)
- LCCN: 72206280
- OCLC no.: 1568678

Links
- Journal homepage; Online access; Online archive

Extrapolation is an academic journal covering speculative fiction, established in 1959. It was the first journal in its field and is published by Liverpool University Press.

== History ==
Extrapolation was established in 1959 by Thomas D. Clareson and was published at the College of Wooster. It was the first academic journal in the field of speculative fiction. (Note: The Encyclopedia of Science Fiction refers to Extrapolation as both an academic journal and a critical magazine.) In 1979, it moved to the Kent State University Press. A decade later, Clareson stepped down as editor-in-chief and was succeeded by Donald M. Hassler of the KSU English Department. In 2002 the journal was transferred to the University of Texas at Brownsville. At that time Donald M. Hassler became executive editor, and the position of editor was filled by Javier A. Martinez of UTB/TSC's Department of English. In 2007, Hassler retired and the current editors are Martinez, Andrew M. Butler (Canterbury Christ Church University), Gerry Canavan (Marquette University), Rachel Haywood-Ferreira (Iowa State University) and John Rieder (University of Hawaii). The reviews editor is D. Harlan Wilson (Wright State University).

The journal is currently published by Liverpool University Press.

== Contents ==
Extrapolation covers all areas of speculative culture, including print, film, television, comic books, and video games, and particularly encourages papers which consider popular texts within their larger cultural context. The journal publishes papers from a wide variety of critical approaches including literary criticism, Utopian studies, genre criticism, feminist theory, critical race studies, queer theory, and postcolonial theory. It is interested in promoting dialogue among scholars working within a number of traditions and in encouraging the serious study of popular culture.

Extrapolation appears three times a year.

== See also ==
- Femspec
- Foundation – The International Review of Science Fiction
- The Internet Review of Science Fiction
- Mythlore
- The New York Review of Science Fiction
- Science Fiction Studies
