= Assassin's Apprentice =

1995 novel by Robin Hobb

- First edition (US)
- Author: Robin Hobb
- Cover artist: Michael Whelan
- Language: English
- Series: The Farseer Trilogy
- Genre: Fantasy
- Publisher: Spectra (US); Voyager Books (UK)
- Publication date: 1 April 1995 (US)
- Publication place: United States
- Media type: Print (Paperback & Hardback in the UK, Paperback in the US)
- Pages: 400 pp (first edition, hardback)
- ISBN: 0-00-224606-6 (first edition, hardback)
- OCLC: 60223865
- Followed by: Royal Assassin

Assassin's Apprentice is a fantasy novel by American writer Robin Hobb, the first book in The Farseer Trilogy. It was Margaret Astrid Lindholm Ogden's first book under this pseudonym, and was published in 1995. The book was written under the working title Chivalry’s Bastard.

The novel covers the early life of FitzChivalry, a royal bastard living in Buckkeep Castle as he begins his training as an assassin and successfully safeguards the throne from his over-ambitious uncle Regal, almost at the cost of his life. The stories of characters found in the Farseer Trilogy continue in the Tawny Man Trilogy and the Fitz and the Fool Trilogy. Other series, The Liveship Traders and The Rain Wild Chronicles, are set in the same world and in the same timeframe, with some crossover.

== Plot ==
A six-year-old boy is taken by his maternal grandfather to the Farseers' army base in Moonseye, the Six Duchies' outpost on the border of the Mountain Kingdom. His grandfather says he is King-in-Waiting Chivalry's bastard son. The boy is brought to Prince Verity, the second Son of King Shrewd who is currently in command of Moonseye. Verity orders that the boy be given into the care of Burrich, Chivalry's right-hand man and stableman, who calls the boy (who does not know his own name) "Fitz". With Burrich, Fitz travels to Buckkeep, the seat of the Farseer throne. Before Fitz arrives, Chivalry abdicates from the post of King-in-Waiting so that there will not be uncertainty about his bastard son's claim to the throne. Chivalry retires to the royal holdings of Withywoods with his wife Lady Patience without ever meeting Fitz. Chivalry's and Verity's younger half-brother, Prince Regal, despises Fitz and treats him badly when he arrives.

Burrich is left with the task of raising Fitz and trains him as a stable boy. Fitz is treated poorly for being a bastard, so he becomes a close friend of a young dog named Nosy. Fitz possesses what is known as Wit, an ancient and distrusted magic which allows him to communicate telepathically with animals. He 'bonds' with Nosy, but this is discovered by Burrich. With apparent disgust, he takes Nosy away, thus breaking the bond, and warns Fitz not to use the Wit, which is widely seen as a perversion. The only other companionship Fitz finds is with children living in Buckkeep town — in particular, a girl called Molly.

Fitz is desperately lonely and seemingly has no prospects. However, he catches the attention of King Shrewd, who sees that a bastard can be either a threat or an asset to the royal line. Fitz swears fealty to the king. He is taken into the castle proper and is schooled, taught combat skills, and develops a sense of loyalty to the Farseer line, especially King-in-Waiting Verity. One night he is introduced to a recluse named Chade Fallstar, who is a skilled assassin and spy. Fitz agrees to secretly learn Chade's skills and complete minor assassin work for King Shrewd. Meanwhile, Chivalry dies when thrown from a horse, but it is strongly suspected that Queen Desire, King Shrewd's second wife and Regal's mother, has had him assassinated. The widowed Lady Patience arrives at Buckkeep, where she and Fitz become close, and he adopts the name "FitzChivalry." Lady Patience gives Fitz a puppy, which he names Smithy and secretly forms a Wit bond with.

The coastal regions of the Six Duchies are being attacked by Outislanders known as the Red-Ship Raiders. The Raiders rampage through villages and towns, killing and taking hostages while stealing little, making their attacks seem to lack a motive. The hostages are returned, reduced to a brutal, emotionless state driven only by desire; they are named the Forged Ones. Forged Ones become robbers that plunder the countryside; Fitz is ordered by Chade to secretly kill many of them, and he finds he cannot sense them with his Wit at all. Verity fights the Raiders with the Skill, a magic found in the Farseer bloodline which allows its users to share thoughts and strength, which weakens him. Fitz becomes "King's Man" to Verity, allowing Verity to link with him to draw out Skill strength for his own use.

Fitz is made part of a class of students to be taught in the Skill to help Verity. The teacher, Galen, despises Fitz, treating him without respect and abusing the students. He tries to kill Fitz, then, with more success, sabotages his Skill training with mental blocks. During the last test of Galen's Skill classes, Galen sends Fitz to Forge, ostensibly to see if he can use the Skill to get back. Fitz is attacked by Forged Ones, although he manages to return safely. While he is away, Galen arranges an assassination attempt on Burrich which Fitz witnesses through Smithy's eyes. Smithy saves Burrich but is killed.

To gain allies against the Raiders, Prince Verity is to be married to Princess Kettricken of the neighboring Mountain Kingdom. Fitz travels there with orders from Shrewd to assassinate Kettricken's brother, Prince Rurisk, to bring Verity closer to the throne, based on information from Regal. However, this is compromised when Regal reveals Fitz's secret mission to Kettricken while drunk and Regal's information proves to be false. Fitz discovers a plan to steal the throne for Regal with the help of Galen, who tries to assassinate Verity using the Skill. Rurisk is poisoned and killed, leaving Kettricken the sole heir of the Mountain Kingdom. Fitz is poisoned by Regal but manages to contact Verity using the Skill to help him kill Galen. Fitz is rescued by his dog Nosy, who was not killed by Burrich, but sent to the Mountain Kingdom as a gift. Fitz recovers slowly, with lasting effects on his health. He laments the death of Nosy during that event and the pain of an older narrator at writing this.

== Reception ==
Assassin’s Apprentice earned generally positive reviews. Publishers Weekly stated the book was "a gleaming debut in the crowded field of epic fantasies and Arthurian romances." Kirkus Reviews found the story to be "satisfyingly self-contained yet leaving plenty of scope for future extensions and embellishments." Reviewer Adam Miller praised the novel's characters for being "deep and complex."

== Influence ==
The Dutch symphonic metal band Within Temptation used this book as inspiration for their song "Hand of Sorrow" from their album The Heart of Everything. British group Kitchen Party cited the novel as an inspiration for their 2013 single "Fitz's Poem".

== Editions ==
- An American English paperback edition was issued in New York by Bantam Books in 1995 with ISBN 0-553-37445-1. The cover of this edition is illustrated by Michael Whelan.
- A British English hardback edition was issued in London by Voyager/HarperCollins in 1995 with ISBN 0-00-224606-6. This edition's cover is illustrated by John Howe.
- A British English clothbound edition was issued in London by Voyager/HarperCollins in 2013 with ISBN 978-0-00-749155-1.
- In September 2020, Folio Society released an illustrated hardback edition of the trilogy, with illustrations by David Palumbo.
- An American English audiobook edition was recorded by Paul Boehmer and published by Tantor Media in 2010 with ISBN 978-1-4001-8434-7.
