= Duchy =

Territory ruled by, or representing the title of, a duke or duchess

A duchy, also called a dukedom, is a country, territory, fief, or domain ruled by a duke or duchess. In Western European tradition, the title of duke ranked among the highest nobility, generally just below the monarch and above counts or earls.

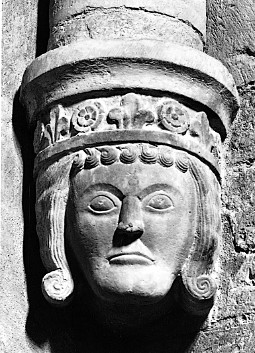
Birger Jarl (†1266) was Sweden's first prince consort and as Dux sveorum et guttorum and regent for his minor son wore a ducal coronet

Historically, there was a significant distinction between sovereign dukes, who ruled independent states, and dukes who were simply noblemen within larger kingdoms. Some duchies functioned as sovereign states in regions that only later became unified nation‑states, such as Germany (once the Holy Roman Empire, a federal empire) and Italy (later a unified kingdom). By contrast, other duchies were subordinate territories within kingdoms that had already consolidated, either partially or fully, during the medieval era: examples include France, Spain, Sicily, Naples, and the Papal States.

== Examples ==
In France, several duchies existed in the medieval period, including Normandy, Burgundy, Brittany, and Aquitaine.

The medieval German stem duchies (German: Stammesherzogtum, literally "tribal duchy," the official title of its ruler being Herzog or "duke") were associated with the Frankish Kingdom and corresponded with the areas of settlement of the major Germanic tribes. They formed the nuclei of the major feudal states that comprised the early era of the Holy Roman Empire of the German nation (961–1806; in German: Heiliges Römisches Reich Deutscher Nation). These were Schwaben (Swabia, mainly the present-day German state of Baden-Württemberg), Bayern (Bavaria), and Sachsen (Saxony) in pre-Carolingian times, to which Franken (Franconia, at present the northern part of the German state of Bavaria) and Lothringen (Lorraine, nowadays mostly part of France) were added in post-Carolingian times. As mentioned above, such a duke was styled Herzog (literally "the one who is leading [the troops]").

In medieval England, duchies associated with the territories of Lancashire and Cornwall were created, with certain powers and estates of land accruing to their dukes. The Duchy of Lancaster was created in 1351 but became merged with the Crown when, in 1399, Henry Bolingbroke, Duke of Lancaster, ascended the throne of England as Henry IV. Nowadays, the Duchy of Lancaster always belongs to the sovereign and its revenue is the Privy Purse. The Duchy of Cornwall was created in 1337 and held successively by the Dukes of Cornwall, who were also heirs to the throne. Nowadays, the Duchy of Cornwall belongs to the sovereign's heir apparent, if there is one: it reverts to the Crown in the absence of an heir apparent and is automatically conferred on the heir apparent upon birth. These duchies today have mostly lost any non-ceremonial political role, but generate their holders' private income. During the Wars of the Roses, the Duke of York made a successful entry into the City of York, by merely claiming no harm and that it was his right to possess "his duchy of York." Any feudal duchies that made up the patchwork of England have since been absorbed into the Royal Family. Other than Cornwall and Lancaster, British royal dukedoms are titular and do not include landholdings. Non-royal dukedoms are associated with ducal property, but this is meant as the duke's private property, with no other feudal privileges attached. At present, all independent (i.e., sovereign) duchies have disappeared.

== List of duchies ==
=== Baltic provinces and governorates ===
- Duchy of Courland and Semigallia
- Duchy of Estonia (disambiguation)
- Duchy of Livonia
- United Baltic Duchy
- Duchy of Lithuania
- Grand Duchy of Lithuania

=== Croatia ===
- Lower Pannonia
- Duchy of Croatia
- Pagania
- Poljica duchy

=== Czechia ===
- Duchy of Bohemia
- Duchy of Bruntal
- Duchy of Krnov
- Duchy of Troppau

=== Denmark ===
- Duchy of Schleswig
- Duchy of Holstein (formerly part of the Holy Roman Empire)

=== England ===
- Duchy of Cornwall
- Duchy of Lancaster

=== France ===
- Duchy of Anjou
- Duchy of Aquitaine
- Duchy of Berry
- Duchy of Bourbon
- Duchy of Brittany
- Duchy of Burgundy
- Duchy of Gascony
- Duchy of Guyenne
- Duchy of Normandy
- Duchy of Orléans
- Duchy of Lorraine

=== Georgia ===
- Duchy of Aragvi
- Duchy of Kldekari
- Duchy of Ksani
- Duchy of Tskhumi
- Duchy of Racha

=== Holy Roman Empire ===
- Duchy of Alsace (in English also 'Alsatia')
- Duchy of Austria (later Archduchy of Austria, in German: Erzherzogtum Österreich)
- Duchy of Bavaria
- Duchy of Bohemia
- Duchy of Brabant
- Duchy of Bremen
- Duchy of Brunswick
- Duchy of Carinthia
- Duchy of Carniola
- Duchy of Franconia
- Duchy of Gelders
- Duchy of Holstein
- Duchy of Jülich
- Duchy of Lauenburg
- Duchy of Limburg
- Duchy of Upper Lorraine
- Duchy of Lower Lorraine
- Duchy of Luxemburg (a Grand Duchy since 1815; see above)
- Duchy of Magdeburg
- Duchy of Mecklenburg
- Duchy of Oldenburg
- Duchy of Palatinate-Zweibrücken
- Duchy of Pomerania
- Duchy of Salzburg
- Duchy of Savoy
- Duchy of Saxe-Altenburg
- Duchy of Saxe-Coburg and Gotha
- Duchy of Saxe-Meiningen
- Duchy of Saxony
- Duchy of Styria
- Duchy of Swabia
- Duchy of Thuringia
- Duchy of Westphalia
- Duchy of Württemberg

The following duchies were part of the medieval Kingdom of Italy, which itself was part of the Holy Roman Empire:

- Duchy of Milan
- Duchy of Mantua
- Duchy of Sabbioneta
- Duchy of Montferrat
- Duchy of Guastalla
- Duchy of Modena and Reggio
- Duchy of Mirandola
- Duchy of Massa and Carrara

=== Indonesia ===
- Duchy of Sumenep
- Duchy of Surabaya

=== Naples ===
- Duchy of Acerenza
- Duchy of Apulia
- Duchy of Bari
- Duchy of Sora

=== Papal States (Holy See) ===
- Duchy of Ferrara
- Duchy of Romagna
- Duchy of Urbino
- Duchy of Camerino
- Duchy of Castro
- Duchy of Parma

=== Poland ===
- Duchy of Poland
- Duchy of Prussia
- Duchy of Racibórz
- Duchy of Warsaw

=== Russia ===
- Grand Duchy of Moscow

=== Slovakia ===
- Duchy of Nitra

=== Spain ===
- Dukedoms of Spain

=== Sweden ===
All provinces of Sweden have the right to have a ducal coronet in their arms. The king gives princes and princesses ducal titles of them. The current such royal duchies are:

- Västergötland
- Värmland
- Gästrikland and Hälsingland combined
- Östergötland
- Gotland
- Ångermanland
- Skåne
- Södermanland
- Dalarna
- Blekinge
- Halland
- Uppland

=== Crusader states ===
- Duchy of Athens
- Duchy of the Archipelago
- Duchy of Neopatras
- Duchy of Philippopolis

=== Other current or historical duchies ===
- Duchy of the Franks
- Duchy of Lower Pannonia
- Duchy of Gascony
- Duchy of Limburg
- Duchy of Livonia
- Duchy of Vasconia
- Duchy of Pakualaman
- Duchy of Mangkunegaran

== See also ==
- Constitutional status of Cornwall
- Ducat
- Duchies in England
- Duchies in Sweden

=== Fictional duchies ===
- Underland, ruled by Underbeit, on The Venture Brothers
- Duchy of Castamar (from The Cook of Castamar)
- Duchy of Atreides from the Dune series by Frank Herbert
- Soleanna from Sonic the Hedgehog
- Duchy of Dollet (from Final Fantasy VIII)
- Grand Duchy of Jeuno (from Final Fantasy XI)
- Duchy of Grand Fenwick
- Borogravia, Quirm (from the Discworld series)
- Duchy of Sto Helit, in the kingdom of Sto Lat (from the Discworld series)
- The Six Duchies (from The Farseer Trilogy and Tawny Man Trilogy by Robin Hobb)
- Zeon (from the Mobile Suit Gundam series, also sometimes translated as a Principality, as the Japanese language does not distinguish between the two)
- Erat, Asturia, Mimbre, Wacune (from the Belgariad series)
- Crydee, Yabon, Krondor, Olasko, Rillanon, Ran, Rodez, Salador, The Sunset Isles (from the Riftwar saga)
- Kolvir, ruled by main character Prince Corwin in The Chronicles of Amber
- Freid (from The Vision of Escaflowne series)
- Cagliostro from Lupin III: The Castle of Cagliostro
- Duchy of Nuts from Adventure Time with Finn & Jake
- Duchy of Harrington from the Honorverse
- Duchy of Toussaint, from The Witcher series.
- Duchy of Serkonos, from Dishonored 2
- Duchy of Urnst, from the Dungeons & Dragons Greyhawk Campaign Setting.
