= Fool's errand (disambiguation) =

Fool's errand is an English idiom referring to a foolish undertaking or a task certain to fail. It may also refer to:

== Books ==
- A Fool's Errand, an 1879 novel by Albion W. Tourgée
- A Fool's Errand, a 1921 book by Jessie Louisa Rickard
- Fool's Errand (novel), a 2001 novel by Robin Hobb
- A Fool's Errand, a 2010 collection of poetry by Dermot Healy
- Fool's Errand, a 2017 book by Scott Horton

== Films ==
- "A Fool's Errand", a 1927 silent short film from the Krazy Kat film series
- "A Fool's Errand", a 2003 episode of animated series Funky Cops

== Other uses ==
- "Do You Really Love Me Too (Fool's Errand)", a 1963 British Top 20 single by Billy Fury
- The Fool's Errand, a 1987 computer game by Cliff Johnson
- A brand of snack cracker, popular in the 1980s
- "Fool's Errand", a song on the Fleet Foxes 2017 album, Crack-Up
