= Royal Assassin =

1996 fantasy novel by Robin Hobb

- UK first edition cover (Voyager)
- Author: Robin Hobb
- Cover artist: John Howe
- Language: English
- Series: The Farseer Trilogy
- Genre: Fantasy
- Publisher: Voyager Books (UK) & Spectra (US)
- Publication date: April 1996 (US), 21 March 1996 (UK)
- Publication place: United States
- Media type: Print (Paperback & Hardback in the UK, Paperback in the US)
- Pages: 580 (UK hardback ed.), 752 (UK paperback ed.)
- ISBN: 0-00-224607-4
- OCLC: 43134636
- Preceded by: Assassin's Apprentice
- Followed by: Assassin's Quest

Royal Assassin is a fantasy novel by American writer Robin Hobb, the second book in The Farseer Trilogy. It was published in 1996.

== Plot summary ==
FitzChivalry has survived Prince Regal's attempt to poison him, but is left weak and prone to unpredictable seizures. Fitz vows to never return to Buckkeep and his king. A vision of Molly fending off an attack by Red-ship Raiders convinces him otherwise, and he returns to the royal court of the Six Duchies.

At Buckkeep, Fitz is immediately embroiled in the intrigues of the royal family. Molly is alive, but she has been left a pauper by her father's death and debts, and serves as a lady's maid at Buckkeep. She and Fitz admit their love for each other and begin a relationship. When Fitz approaches King Shrewd for permission to marry, Shrewd reveals he has already pledged Fitz to the daughter of a duke. Fitz and Molly are left to conduct their courtship in secret, not only because of Shrewd's command, but to keep Molly safe from Fitz's enemies at the court.

King-in-Waiting Verity is consumed by the need to protect the Duchies' coast from the Red-ships, using his Skill to stave off Raider attacks, but failing to give attention to Kettricken, his new queen. King Shrewd suffers a mysterious wasting disease whose pain only mind-clouding drugs can abate, which Fitz suspects is the doing of Regal and his followers. Bands of Forged Ones begin to converge on Buckkeep, which Fitz secretly assassinates. Fitz rescues a young wolf, Nighteyes, and forms a Wit bond with him despite the danger of discovery. Regal and his lackeys come close to discovering that Fitz is Witted, and Fitz struggles to use the Skill to guard his mind.

After their relationship is strained by Fitz's duties and inability to marry her, Molly tells him that she is leaving him and Buck forever for the sake of another. Fitz desperately reveals his biggest secret, that he is an assassin. Molly is instead repulsed and rejects Fitz with finality. Galen's Skill coterie is supposed to help Verity fight the Raiders, but unsent messages and late warnings leave the coastal Duchies easy prey. Verity decides to journey to the mountains to seek the Elderlings, legendary beings that defended the Six Duchies in the past. This leaves Regal free to begin amassing power and loyalty to himself. Shrewd grows more weak and addled. Even the Fool is not safe from Regal, though he hints to Fitz that he has a great destiny. Fitz and Kettricken leave to quell a Raider attack on the coast. While they are gone, Regal announces that word has come that Verity is dead, and makes himself King-in-Waiting.

Using his mostly uncontrollable Skill, Fitz discovers that Verity is still alive, but to say this in the court where Regal now holds power would mean death. After an attempt is made on the life of Verity's unborn heir, Fitz and his mentors Chade and Burrich make plans to spirit King Shrewd and Kettricken, now pregnant, safely out of Regal's reach. Shrewd dies in an attempt to Skill to Verity before the plans can be carried out. However, Fitz gets a glimpse of the true source of the King's long illness and death: Serene and Justin, two members of the coterie, have been using their Skill to slowly drain King Shrewd's life away. Fitz takes the King's blade and immediately assassinates Serene, then hunts down and kills Justin in front of much of the court. Meanwhile, Kettricken manages to escape Buck with the Fool.

Fitz is imprisoned and accused of homicide, regicide, and exposed for using the Wit. Regal, in an attempt to get Fitz to confess to his alleged crimes, tortures Fitz both physically and mentally by having him beaten while a member of the coterie, Will, assaults Fitz with the Skill. Fitz, knowing his mind and body cannot sustain any more punishment, uses the Wit to leave his body behind and join with his wolf, Nighteyes.

After his death, Fitz is publicly pronounced guilty of all charges, and his body is buried by his last remaining supporter, Lady Patience. However, Burrich and Chade exhume Fitz's body and, after much coaxing, convince him to leave Nighteyes' mind and go back into his own body. Looking back on his past, an older Fitz laments the loss of freedom and simplicity he experienced as a wolf.

== Reception ==
Royal Assassin has received mostly positive reviews. Reviewers have generally praised the book's characterization and its climactic ending. Of the book, Kirkus Reviews stated the novel is a "spellbinding installment, built of patient detail, believable characters, and mature plotting—though, at an unwarranted 608 pages, there are ominous signs that Hobb's beginning to lose control of her narrative."

== Editions ==
- An American English paperback edition was issued in New York by Bantam Books in 1996 with ISBN 0-553-37563-6.
- A British English hardback edition was issued in London by Voyager/HarperCollins in 1996 with ISBN 0-00-224607-4. This edition's cover is illustrated by John Howe.
- In September 2020, Folio Society released a new illustrated hardback edition of the trilogy, with illustrations by David Palumbo.
