= Assassin's Quest =

1997 novel by Robin Hobb

- UK first edition cover (Voyager)
- Author: Robin Hobb
- Cover artist: John Howe
- Language: English
- Series: The Farseer Trilogy
- Genre: Fantasy
- Publisher: Voyager Books (UK) & Spectra (US)
- Publication date: 3 March 1997 (UK), April 1997 (US)
- Publication place: United States
- Media type: Print (Paperback & Hardback in the UK, Paperback in the US)
- Pages: 742 (UK hardback ed.), 848 (UK paperback ed.)
- ISBN: 0-00-224608-2
- OCLC: 43211976
- Preceded by: Royal Assassin

Assassin's Quest is a 1997 fantasy novel by American writer Robin Hobb, the third and final book in The Farseer Trilogy. It follows the exploits of FitzChivalry Farseer. While Fitz's narrative continues in The Tawny Man Trilogy, the Liveship Traders Trilogy is next in the chronology of the Realm of the Elderlings.

== Plot summary ==
FitzChivalry Farseer has been resurrected but spends months with the mind of a wolf after sharing minds with Nighteyes. He lives in a remote cabin watched by Burrich and Chade, the only ones who know he is alive. Fitz gradually regains his humanity but struggles with the loss of his former life and the trauma of his torture by King Regal. Fitz decides only a personal quest to kill Regal will bring him peace. Before departing, Fitz is attacked by and kills Forged Ones. Through his uncontrollable Skill dreams, Fitz later learns that Burrich found the scene and believes him dead. Burrich is caring for Molly, Fitz's former lover who is now pregnant with his child. Meanwhile, Lady Patience leads Buckkeep's remaining resistance against the Red Ship Raiders.

Fitz travels to Regal's palace in Tradeford but fails to assassinate him thanks to the remaining coterie members. Verity aids his escape and imprints the command "Come To Me" into Fitz's mind. Unable to disobey, Fitz follows the path of Verity's quest to find the Elderlings in the Mountain Kingdom. His bond with his Wit companion, Nighteyes, deepens as they become more similar. The wolf begins to think as a human does. Fitz meets other Witted people who call themselves "Old Blood," but declines to learn more about their ways.

Fitz and Nighteyes are joined by Starling, a minstrel, and Kettle, an old woman seeking the White Prophet. They evade Regal's men and reach the Mountain Kingdom. Fitz is tended back to health by the White Prophet, revealed to be the Fool. The Fool has prophesied that Fitz is a Catalyst and essential to the future of the Six Duchies. Verity and Kettricken's child was stillborn. Kettricken and Chade decide to take Fitz and Molly's daughter to become the Farseer heir, despite Fitz's pleas against it.

As Regal attempts to conquer the Mountain Kingdom, Fitz, Kettricken, the Fool, and Starling set off to find Verity, followed by Kettle, who is mysteriously knowledgeable about the Skill. The group encounter a road leading to a ruined city, both constructed of a black stone imbued with Skill. The road is perilous for those sensitive to the Skill. Fitz survives with the guidance of Kettle and his bond with Nighteyes, and also develops a bond with the Fool. They discover a garden full of dragon sculptures that Fitz senses as alive, realizing they may be the Elderlings.

Beyond the garden is a quarry of Skill stone where they find Verity, frail and obsessed with carving a dragon of his own. Kettle reveals she is the last remaining member of a former royal coterie, though her Skill ability was taken from her. She reveals that the stone dragons were carved by Skilled Farseers and their coteries by Skilling their own memories and emotions into the stone, sacrificing themselves to animate the dragons. Fitz uses his Skill and Wit to help Verity and Kettle restore each other's Skill strength. They nearly complete the dragon, but Verity does not have enough power. After learning that Molly and Burrich have fallen in love while caring for her daughter, Fitz offers his own life on the condition that they be left alone. Instead, Verity and Fitz's minds switch bodies, allowing Verity to share a last night with Kettricken and providing a final surge of emotion and memory. Verity becomes the dragon and flies with Kettricken and Starling to defend Buckkeep.

The Fool inadvertently wakes another incomplete dragon while Fitz faces Regal's men. He learns how to wake the other dragons with a combination of blood and Wit. The risen dragons defeat the soldiers and Will, and are then led by Verity-as-Dragon to defeat the Red Ship Raiders. With his coterie broken, Regal has no defense against Fitz. Instead of killing him, Fitz imprints him with fanatical loyalty to Kettricken and the Six Duchies. Regal restores Buckkeep and ensures the legitimacy of Kettricken and Verity's heir, Prince Dutiful.

After the Raiders are defeated, the dragons return to the mountains to sleep as stone. The Fool disappears, his prophecy apparently fulfilled. Fitz retires into anonymity and travels for several years. Chade and Starling are some of the few who know he still lives, attempting to write about his history.

== Themes ==
Assassin’s Quest has been called a coming of age story. A starred review from Publishers Weekly stated that the story holds a lesson "that the pursuit of truth demands a price in loneliness only a few can or will pay." Other reviewers have pointed to a sense of hopelessness in the narrative and how often Hobb makes use of failure.

== Reception ==
Assassin’s Quest received positive reviews from critics. Reviewers have called the novel a fun and enjoyable read. Publishers Weekly gave the novel a starred review and commented on the "shimmering language". Kirkus Reviews called the novel "an enthralling conclusion to this superb trilogy, displaying an exceptional combination of originality, magic, adventure, character, and drama."

== Editions ==
- An American English paperback edition was issued in New York by Bantam Books in 1997 with ISBN 0-553-10640-6.
- A British English hardback edition was issued in London by Voyager/HarperCollins in 1997 with ISBN 0-00-224608-2. This edition's cover is illustrated by John Howe.
- In September 2020, Folio Society released a new illustrated hardback edition of the trilogy, with illustrations by David Palumbo.
