= Blood of Dragons =

2013 novel by Robin Hobb

- First edition (UK)
- Author: Robin Hobb
- Language: English
- Series: The Rain Wild Chronicles
- Genre: Fantasy
- Published: March 2013; HarperVoyager (UK)
- Publication place: United Kingdom
- Media type: Print (hardback)
- Preceded by: City of Dragons

Blood of Dragons is a fantasy novel by American writer Robin Hobb, the fourth and final book in The Rain Wild Chronicles. It was released in March 2013; it is a direct continuation of the previous novel, City of Dragons.

== Plot summary ==
The keepers and their dragons have to adapt to Kelsingra and their new reality as elderlings. Frictions arise with the Duke of Chalcede who believes that dragon flesh and/or blood could cure him. Tintaglia gets shot by a poisoned arrow and has to seek elderling help. Hest gets tangled up with a chalcidian merchant who threatens him. Many traders and merchants are pressured to bring back anything that could heal the Duke and people get curious about the elderling city and its riches. Rapscal gets more and more swept by the memory stones and start to lose himself.
