= Dragon Keeper =

Fantasy novel by American writer Robin Hobb

- First edition (UK)
- Author: Robin Hobb
- Cover artist: Jackie Morris
- Language: English
- Series: The Rain Wild Chronicles
- Genre: Fantasy
- Publisher: HarperVoyager (UK)
- Publication date: 25 June 2009 (UK)
- Publication place: United Kingdom
- Media type: Print (hardback & paperback)
- Pages: 553 (both editions)
- ISBN: 978-0-00-727374-4 (UK hardback edition)
- OCLC: 316002555
- Followed by: Dragon Haven

Dragon Keeper is a 2009 fantasy novel by American writer Robin Hobb, the first in The Rain Wild Chronicles. It is written in a third-person narrative from the viewpoint of several of the key characters. The narrative follows a party of malformed newly hatched dragons, their spurned and mistrusted human keepers and other supporters who set out on a quest to find safety in the legendary Elderling city of Kelsingra.

== Plot summary ==
The book opens as a group of sea serpents have nearly finished their long journey upriver to encase themselves so they might hatch into dragons. It is late in the year and the serpents are older than is normal to make the journey. The last known dragon, Tintaglia, is overseeing this journey in the hopes that dragons will be reintroduced to the world. The Rain Wilds Council has agreed to help in exchange for her helping the Rain Wilds people in their war against Chalced. Sisarqua, a queen serpent, struggles to finish her casing and is assisted by Tintaglia.

The captain of the Tarman, Leftrin, comes across a piece of wizardwood, an encased dragon that has been washed away by the river. At first he thinks to sell it for an immense profit, but then decides to use it for his ship to protect it against the acidic river.

Thymara, an 11-year-old girl with claws and scaling, consistent with Rain Wilds defects from birth, goes with her father to watch the hatching of the dragons. She is shocked to find that the new hatchlings are weak and malformed. She communicates with one when her father is almost killed and eaten. Sisarqua has turned into a dragon, naming herself Sintara; she is distraught to realize that her proportions are all wrong and she is not what she should be, and will likely never fly.

Alise Kincarron is a plain, freckled young woman, past the prime age for marriage and suspecting spinsterhood. Most of her time is consumed by her passion for dragons and her studies thereof. She is unsure of the attention she is getting from a handsome local Trader, Hest Finbok. When finally confronting him, he admits that he is not in love with her, but is wishing for a marriage of convenience for both of them. If she can provide him with an heir, he will fund her fancies, including her research of dragons, including a trip to study the hatchling dragons since he had caused her to miss a trip she had already planned to watch them hatch. Agreeing, Alise begins to hope for a real marriage to her handsome suitor, but is desperately disappointed on her wedding night. She learns that the marriage was suggested by her childhood friend, Sedric. She ultimately decides that if she sold herself, she would demand a high price, and begins to use Hest's money freely to pursue her studies of dragons and Elderlings.

With some time having passed on the Tarman, the work with the wizardwood is finished. Captain Leftrin wants to give a lifetime contract to all of the workers to protect the secret of their illegal use of the forbidden substance. The only remaining man to sign is Swarge, who admits that he is betrothed and does not want to be separated from his new wife-to-be. Leftrin agrees to give a contract to Swarge's wife so that they may be together and Swarge signs the contract. Some time later, Captain Leftrin is blackmailed by a Chalcedean man, Sinad Arich, for passage to Trehaug. Leftrin hopes that he will never hear from the man again.

Meanwhile, Alise has given up on all efforts to make Hest attracted, or even interested in her, as they have all been met with failure or worse. Hest is displeased with Alise's inability to produce an heir and comes for another one of his unpleasant attempts to impregnate her. When she is unwilling, he rapes her. After the shame of this event, she accuses him of being unfaithful to her, in the hopes of ending their marriage contract, and provides proof in certain things she has noted, such as his luxurious perfumes and a second house that he rents. Hest is furious and demands that Sedric, his secretary and constant companion, confirm his fidelity. Sedric confirms that Hest is not having an affair with a woman, though it is later revealed Sedric is, in fact, Hest's lover.

Four years have passed since the hatching and Sintara is sad and tormented by the dragon memories that she is filled with. The dragons are weak and unable to feed themselves, relying on hunters to provide them with a limited amount of food. As the more feeble dragons die off, the stronger ones consume them to claim their ancestral memories. Tintaglia has gone missing, not having been seen for some time. It is rumored that she has found a mate and no one, including the young dragons, believes that she will return. The dragons begin to yearn to find their way to the lost Elderling city of Kelsingra, or die trying. The dragon Mercor makes a plan to convince the Rain Wilds Council that it is their idea to transport the dragons toward the lost city using their ancestral memories as a guide.

Alise confronts Hest about the promise he made on their marriage contract that she would be allowed to go on a trip to study the newly hatched dragons. Hest is furious but when she threatens to spread the fact that he has put very little effort into conceiving a child on her, thus damaging his reputation, he agrees. In his anger, he sends Sedric with her, furious that Sedric took her side in the argument. Alise and Sedric travel to Trehaug on the liveship Paragon, a ship made of wizardwood that has gained sentience due to the wizardwood from which it was made. She learns about the truth of the malformed young dragons and how they are not like the dragons of old, and she begs Paragon to tell her of his dragon memories to make up for the disappointment. The liveship refuses, claiming that he has accepted his fate and that he does not want to recall those memories of what he could have been.

Alise arranges to go from Trehaug to Cassarick to speak with the dragons. She and Sedric, much to his chagrin, are taken aboard the Tarman and Captain Leftrin is immediately infatuated with Alise. She is surprised by his attention but finds him charming and enjoys his company. He is summoned to the Rain Wilds Council to be a part of the voyage, carrying supplies and providing a safe place for the keepers. Alise agrees to join the expedition as a dragon expert in the place of the Eldering, Malta, who is with child and unable to go herself. Alise is simultaneously thrilled and terrified by the idea.

Captain Leftrin soon finds a message from Sinad Arich, terrified to realized that his blackmailer is not completely out of his life. The Trader tells him to keep an eye out for someone that he should recognize, and Leftrin hopes that it is not a hunter hired to help feed the dragons that he is acquainted with.

As the dragons' plan succeeds, Thymara is offered a job as a dragon keeper, to select a dragon and tend to it and hunt for it on the journey towards Kelsingra. Her father, who loved her enough to save her from being abandoned as a child (as per the norm for disfigured infants), refuses to let her go. Thymara, with high hopes for adventure and a life of her own, convinces him to let her go. Her friend, Tats, a Tattooed slave who had moved to the Rain Wilds when they were freed, also joins the expedition. Thymara notes that he is the only one not bearing Rain Wilds taint, and that he was discouraged from going, leading her to believe that the trip will be dangerous and that the council is intending to risk the lives of only those who are unworthy of life in the Rain Wilds, others bearing extensive taint like herself. She signs the contract and says farewell to her father, giving him the first part of her payment in the hopes that he will use it if her family has any financial troubles. When they go to meet the dragons, she selects Sintara as the dragon she wants to look after, though their introduction does not seem to go as smoothly as everyone elses'. It is hinted that Thymara is possibly immune to the dragon's glamour. Though Thymara is initially thrilled by the new companionship in the group of keepers, Greft tries to assert himself as leader, leading her to distrust him and his strange advances. Tensions continue to build as Thymara kills an elk and Greft claims part of it for himself and two others.

As the first few days pass, Sedric's attempts to convince Alise to give up her journey and go back fall on deaf ears. She continues to find herself more and more infatuated with Leftrin, despite his differences from the posh traders she has grown up around. She tries to speak to Sintara, who basks in her compliments and enjoys making Thymara fight to get her attention away from Alise. Alise finds it hard to get any real information from her.

Two of the weaker dragons do not have keepers. Thymara, Tats, and a young girl named Sylve, try tending to the wounds on the weak silver dragon's tail. Sedric comes to help with the hopes of getting some valuable dragon items, keeping some pieces of festering flesh. He thinks back on how Hest slowly took over his life. He befriends Thymara so that she will translate for him when Alise speaks to the dragons, as he cannot understand them when they speak. Later on, he sneaks out at night to take some scales from a copper dragon, near death, and gets some blood from it as well, which he tastes. When the keepers realize that the dragon will not last much longer, there is an argument as to what should be done with it, where Greft thinks that they can use the dragon. Mercor arrives to tell them that dragons belong only to dragons and he will watch over the copper with Sylve until it dies. It is uncertain at this point if they realize that Sedric had stolen body parts from it. Sedric goes on to tell Alise that they must leave because he fears that the obvious attraction between her and Captain Leftrin will make her unfaithful.

The book closes with the last letter between the pigeon keepers, revealing Alise's father's concern about her agreement to travel up the Rain Wilds River with the expedition.

== Editions ==
- 2009, UK, HarperVoyager ISBN 978-0-00-727374-4, Pub date 26 June 2009, Hardback
- 2009, Australia, HarperVoyager ISBN 978-0-00-727376-8, Pub date 1 July 2009, Paperback
