= City of Dragons =

2011 fantasy novel by Robin Hobb

- First edition (UK)
- Author: Robin Hobb
- Cover artist: Jackie Morris
- Language: English
- Series: The Rain Wild Chronicles
- Genre: Fantasy
- Publisher: HarperVoyager (UK)
- Publication date: September 2011 (NL)
- Publication place: United Kingdom
- Media type: Print (hardback)
- Preceded by: Dragon Haven
- Followed by: Blood of Dragons

City of Dragons is a 2011 fantasy novel by American writer Robin Hobb, the third book in The Rain Wild Chronicles. It was released in September 2011 and is a direct continuation of the previous novel: Dragon Haven.

== Plot summary ==
The dragon Tintaglia and her mate IceFyre fly to a sandy oasis they visit often where they are ambushed by men. They manage to fight off the men but Tintaglia is stabbed by a spear in her armpit and is struck in the wing by an arrow. When feasting on the corpses of the men a boy, still alive, reveals they were blackmailed by the Duke of Chalced in order to harvest some of the dragons body parts, which the Duke believes will cure his illness.

In a tent, Selden, an Elderling is being kept a slave and sideshow attraction.

Sintara and the other dragons have reached Kelsingra but only Heeby can fly. Rapskal takes the other keepers over to Kelsingra on Heeby and gets lost in the skill memories of a statue. He is brought back by Leftrin and warned of getting lost forever.

Malta and Reyn travel to Cassarack. Malta is heavily pregnant and must decide what to do if the baby is born with severe defects. Leftrin and the Tarman arrive in Cassarack as well and ask for payment for successfully moving the dragons upriver.

Rapskal and Thymara travel to Kelsingra and Rapskal shows her an Elderling memory where they are lovers. Sintara manages to fly across the river to Kelsingra and activates the city, lighting it up and re-starting the warming baths. Rapskal and Thymara sleep together. Sintara and Heeby spend the night in the dragon baths and become stronger.

Malta goes into labor and is attacked by Chalcedeans who wish to sell her baby as dragon parts. She escapes and brings her newborn to the deck of the Tarman. The Tarman tells her the baby will die unless he is helped by a dragon. Leftrin and his crew realize they need to flee back to Kelsingra, and are followed.

On one of the ships following the Tarman is Hest Finbock, Alise's husband who is convinced that he owns a portion of Kelsingra due to his marriage to Alise and his employment of Sedric.

The Duke of Chalced realizes that his daughter and only heir is trying to kill him. He agrees to marry her off to one of his minor lords, who brings him skin from Selden's shoulder as a gesture of goodwill.

Tintaglia realizes the arrow that shot her was likely poisoned and needs to be removed with human hands. She decides to fly back to Kelsingra without IceFyre.

== Characters ==
- Alise Kincarron Finbok – one of the main protagonists, a self-taught scholar of dragons.
- Thymara – one of the main protagonists, keeper to Sintara.
- Sintara – one of the main protagonists, a blue dragon queen with gleaming copper eyes (Thymara's dragon).
- Captain Leftrin – one of the main protagonists, Captain of the barge Tarman.
- Sedric – one of the main protagonists, secretary to Hest Finbok, he is assigned to accompany Alise Finbok on her journey. Keeper of Relpda.
- Tats – keeper of the dragon Fente, childhood friend of Thymara and a former tattoo slave.
- Sylve – keeper of the dragon Mercor.
- Rapskal – keeper of the dragon Heeby.

Minor Characters

- Carson Lupskip – a hunter and an old friend of Leftrin's. Tends to the dragon Spit
- Davvie – a hunter (bowman) and nephew to Carson. Tends to Kalo.
- Ranculos – a scarlet, male dragon.
- Sestican – an azure male dragon with an orange filigreed mane, kept by Lecter.
- Mercor – a golden dragon with black eyes and false eye markings on his wings. tended by Sylve. Implied to have previously been the sea serpent Maulkin.
- Heeby – a small red dragon queen, tended by Rapskal. The first to fly
- Jerd – keeper of the dragon Veras.
- Fente – a green dragon queen with a nasty temperament, tended by Tats.
- Veras – a dragon, tended by Jerd.
- Arbuc – Alum's dragon.
- Kalo – a blue-black male dragon with green eyes, the largest of their clan, tended by Davvie.
- Spit – a small silver dragon tended to by Carson.
- Relpda – a small copper dragon queen, tended by Sedric.
- Kase – tends to an unnamed orange dragon, cousin to Boxter.
- Boxter – tends to an unnamed orange dragon, cousin to Kase.
- Alum – a dragon keeper to Arbuc.
- Nortel – a dragon keeper.
- Harrikin – a dragon keeper, foster brother to Lecter. He is the second oldest keeper at 20 years.
- Lecter – a dragon keeper, foster brother to Harrikin.
- Skelly – Deckhand on Tarman and niece of Leftrin.
- Big Eider – Deckhand on Tarman.
- Hennesey – Mate on Tarman.
- Hest Finbok – Husband of Alise Finbok, a rich and important Bingtown trader.
- Swarge – Tillerman of the barge Tarman.
- Bellin – Wife to Swarge, a poleman on Tarman.
- Tarman – A liveship river barge made from wizardwood.
