= Fool's Errand (novel) =

2001 novel by Robin Hobb

- First edition
- Author: Robin Hobb
- Cover artist: John Howe
- Language: English
- Series: Tawny Man Trilogy
- Genre: Fantasy
- Publisher: Voyager/HarperCollins
- Publication date: 15 October 2001
- Media type: Print (hardback)
- ISBN: 0002247267
- OCLC: 47665323
- Followed by: The Golden Fool

Fool's Errand is a fantasy novel by American writer Robin Hobb, the first in her Tawny Man Trilogy. It commences 15 years after the events in Assassin's Quest, a period covered by The Liveship Traders Trilogy (Ship of Magic, The Mad Ship, Ship of Destiny); it resumes the story of FitzChivalry Farseer after he has wandered the world and finally settled to a quiet, cottage-dwelling life with his adopted son Hap.

== Plot summary ==
Fifteen years have passed since the end of the Red Ship War. Since then, Fitz has wandered the world accompanied only by his wolf and Wit-partner, Nighteyes, finally settling in a tiny cottage as isolated from the Farseers and Buckkeep politics as possible. He raises his adopted son, Hap, who was brought to him by Starling, whose visits are Fitz's only connection to his old life. Fitz now goes by the name "Tom Badgerlock."

Chade finds Fitz and asks him to return to Buckkeep to instruct Prince Dutiful, Kettricken's son, in the Skill, but Fitz refuses. Later, the Fool finds Fitz. The Fool hints at his adventures in the last fifteen years and reveals that he has now foreseen that he must return to Buckkeep, but Fitz declines to join. Shortly after the Fool leaves, Fitz receives an urgent summons from Chade and goes to Buckkeep. Chade reveals that Dutiful has gone missing just before his crucial diplomatic wedding to an Outislander princess. Fitz's assignment to fetch Dutiful back in time for the ceremony, while also keeping the secret that Dutiful is Witted. As Tom Badgerlock, Fitz becomes the servant of Lord Golden, the Fool's new identity at Buckkeep, to track down the Prince.

Fitz and the Fool, joined by Queen's Woman Laurel, travel to the home of the Bresingas, nobles suspected to be Witted. There, they come to understand that Prince Dutiful was given a hunting cat and coerced into bonding with it, which is an abomination in the eyes of the "Old Blood" (Witted traditionalists). At the same time, the party becomes more aware of the danger posed by the "Piebalds" (Witted extremists).

It is revealed that one of the leaders of the Piebalds, Peladine, is a dead Witted woman whose consciousness resides in the Prince's cat. Peladine intends to deepen the Wit bond with Dutiful and take over his body. Dutiful is initially enraptured with Peladine and distrustful of Fitz, but comes to understand the danger he is in.

The Prince's cat fights off Peladine's control long enough to let Fitz kill her, ending the threat for the moment. Nighteyes dies in Fitz's arms through a combination of injuries sustained in the battle and his old age. The Prince and Fitz gradually begin to grow closer, although the nature of their relationship is not revealed

== Editions ==
- A British English paperback edition was issued in London by Voyager/HarperCollins in 2001 with ISBN 0-00-224726-7.
- An American English paperback edition was issued in New York by Bantam Books in 2002 with ISBN 0-553-58244-5.
- A British paperback edition was issued in London by Voyager/Harpercollins in 2002 with ISBN 0-00-648601-0.
