= The Golden Fool =

2002 novel by Robin Hobb

- First edition
- Author: Robin Hobb
- Cover artist: John Howe
- Language: English
- Series: Tawny Man Trilogy
- Genre: Fantasy
- Publisher: Voyager/HarperCollins
- Publication date: 21 October 2002
- Media type: Print (hardback)
- ISBN: 0007160380
- Preceded by: Fool's Errand
- Followed by: Fool's Fate

The Golden Fool is a fantasy novel by American writer Robin Hobb, the second in her Tawny Man Trilogy. It was published in 2002.

== Plot summary ==
Fitz, though bitter and grieving after the death of his beloved wit-partner Nighteyes, reluctantly takes the post of Skillmaster to teach Prince Dutiful the Skill. He feels he must since he is almost Dutiful's father. Dutiful, the heir to the throne, was conceived by Verity using Fitz's body fifteen years earlier with the use of the Skill, and because of this is both Skilled and Witted. Fitz is not a great teacher and barely has control of his own Skill, but he is the only one left that has been actually taught how to use it. He knows that Dutiful must be protected from the addictive qualities of the Skill, as well as the dangerous temptations of the Wit and the political machinations surrounding both as the Piebalds threaten to throw the Six Duchies into civil war.

Maintaining a pose as the servant Tom Badgerlock to the Fool's own pose as the decadent noble Lord Golden, rumors surrounding the relationship between Fitz and the Fool start to wear on Fitz. The two have a large fight as Fitz demands answers of the Fool that the Fool does not want to give and they go for a time without speaking.

As Fitz acclimatizes to the secret room once owned by Chade, he meets Thick; Thick is a young man with mental limitations who is stronger in the Skill than anyone that Fitz has ever met. Initially, Thick dislikes Fitz strongly but the two come to understand each other. Thick unknowingly reveals that he has been coerced for information on Fitz by the Piebalds. Using this information, Fitz tracks the Piebalds to Buckkeep town and kills three of them including Laudwine, as well as Laudwine's wit-beast. Fitz also sustains a mortal injury while rescuing Civil Bresinga who likewise was coerced to serve the Piebalds.

Dutiful, The Fool, Thick, and Chade all work together to use the Skill in order to save Fitz's life, cementing themselves as Dutiful's coterie. This causes Chade's Skill ability to manifest for the first time, and also cures Fitz of many other injuries, such as the ones he sustained in Regal's dungeon. Fitz begins training the coterie in earnest with varying success.

At the same time, the Six Duchies also faces what may be its salvation in a long-term peace, or a new threat to the fragile peace that has existed since the end of the Red Ship War. Queen Kettricken plans to betroth Dutiful to the Outislander Narcheska (Clan-Leader) Elliania, to forge a lasting alliance between the two lands as her marriage to Verity once did. The task is less simple than it appears, and Fitz becomes aware of wheels within wheels, as different interests war with each other with the stakes higher than anyone has imagined. These finally come to a head as Elliania declares she will not wed Dutiful without his undertaking a quest to slay Icefyre, one of the last true dragons. As Fitz and the Fool reconcile, the Fool reveals that he foresaw his own death while on the quest.

== Editions ==
- A British English edition was issued in London by Voyager/HarperCollins in 2002 with ISBN 0-00-716038-0. This edition's cover is illustrated by John Howe.
