= Fool's Fate =

2003 novel by Robin Hobb

- First edition (UK)
- Author: Robin Hobb
- Cover artist: John Howe
- Language: English
- Series: Tawny Man Trilogy
- Genre: Fantasy
- Publisher: Voyager/HarperCollins
- Publication date: 1 November 2003
- Media type: Print (hardback)
- ISBN: 0002247283
- Preceded by: The Golden Fool

Fool's Fate is a fantasy novel by American writer Robin Hobb, the third in her Tawny Man Trilogy. It was published in 2003.

== Plot summary ==
At the Narwhal Clan motherhouse, Dutiful and Elliania are formally betrothed, on condition that Dutiful will slay the dragon Icefyre. The two begin to grow closer.

The small party of Dutiful's Wit and Skill coteries and Elliania's retinue arrive on Aslevjal, greeted by the Fool, who Fitz had left behind to prevent his death. His intention to save the dragon is opposed to Chade who is determined to slay the dragon to secure the marriage which he thinks will bring peace. In addition, Fitz and Chade learn that there is a certain “Black Man" who is a figure of superstition and reverence to the Outislanders.

The band on the island begin digging down to the dragon. Investigating a disappearance, Fitz and the Fool fall into a snow chasm and arrive at the realm of the Pale Woman, who had kidnapped and Forged Elliana’s mother and sister in order to ensure her loyalty. First through seduction and then through coercion, the Pale Woman tries to make Fitz her Catalyst. She chains the Fool to memory stone and threatens to slowly Forge him unless Fitz kills Icefyre. Fitz promises to kill the dragon and is thrown out of the Pale Woman's realm. He finds his way to camp where Burrich has come, having learned of Fitz’s survival.

As Fitz prepares to detonate Chade's explosives and kill the dragon, he realizes that the death of Icefyre would appear to be an attack by the Six Duchies on the Outislands, and respark war between the two countries. He decides to trust the Fool’s prophecy and free the dragon. Tintaglia arrives.

Once Icefyre is freed, the Pale Woman unleashes her own dragon, made of memory stone and embodying Kebal Rawbread. The dragon attacks Icefyre and Tintaglia, wounding the latter. Burrich is mortally hurt but successfully uses the Wit to pause the stone dragon long enough for Swift to kill it with a wizardwood arrow. The Forged Outislanders return to themselves. Icefyre and Tintaglia unite and begin to usher in a new age of dragons.

Fitz finds the Fool dead and tortured in the Pale Woman's realm and brings him through the Skill Pillars to the Quarry. He is able to heal the Fool’s body with the Wit and draw his consciousness from the Rooster Crown (a wizardwood relic) back into his body. While in the Quarry, the Fool extracts Fitz’s memories from Girl-on-a-Dragon, and Fitz feels fully whole for the first time since.

While the Fool heals, the Black Man reveals that he is also a White Prophet who was alive during the age of the Elderlings. The Black Man and the Fool decide to go back to the place they were raised in order to improve it. The Fool says farewell to Fitz and removes their Skill bond.

Going through the Skill Pillars too many times in quick succession, Fitz is lost in the Skill and encounters an entity who helps him to remember who he is and travel back to Buckkeep. He discovers that he was gone for a month.

Nettle becomes the head of Dutiful’s coterie and one of her brothers joins. She and Fitz begin to get to know each other and, while she knows that Fitz fathered her, she still considers Burrich to be her father.

Fitz finally reveals his survival to Patience, Molly, and Burrich’s children, who he promised to take care of. After Molly grieves for Burrich, she and Fitz slowly rekindle their relationship and marry.

== Editions ==
- A British English paperback edition was issued in London by Voyager/HarperCollins in 2003 with ISBN 0-00-224728-3. This edition's cover is illustrated by John Howe.
