= Dragon Haven =

2010 novel by Robin Hobb

- First edition cover
- Author: Robin Hobb
- Cover artist: Jackie Morris
- Language: English
- Series: The Rain Wild Chronicles
- Genre: Fantasy
- Publisher: HarperVoyager (UK)
- Publication date: 4 March 2010 (UK)
- Publication place: United Kingdom
- Media type: Print (hardback)
- Pages: 570 (Hardback)
- ISBN: 978-0-00-733581-7 (UK hardback edition)
- OCLC: 316002555
- Preceded by: Dragon Keeper
- Followed by: City of Dragons

Dragon Haven is a fantasy novel by American writer Robin Hobb, the second novel in The Rain Wild Chronicles. In a blog post Robin Hobb wrote: "The untitled book I am working on now picks up the tale of the Tarman expedition in search of Kelsingra. It’s my work in progress and threatens to be a long book!". Dragon Haven is written in third-person narrative from the viewpoint of several key characters. The narrative joins these separate threads together as a party of malformed dragons, their human keepers and other supporters are on a quest for the legendary Elderling city of Kelsingra.

== Plot summary ==
The book opens where the previous book left off following the dragons, the keepers and the barge Tarman as they continue their trek up the river.

Sedric tastes some of the copper dragon's blood and it makes him ill. He is nursed back to health by Alise and Carson. Once he starts to feel better, he is plagued by the thoughts of the copper dragon.

It is revealed that one of the hunters, Jess, was sent by the Chalcedeans to kill a dragon and harvest it for parts. Jess threatens Leftrin in an attempt to blackmail him into helping. Leftrin meets him at the side of the copper dragon, Relpda, and they start to fight. Their fight is interrupted by a flood that everyone gets swept up in.

Sintara saves Alise and Thymara from the water, and they rejoin the rest of the group. Rapskal and Heeby are missing and presumed dead, along with the silver dragon, Relpda, Warken and Sedric.

Sedric wakes up in the river with Relpda and helps her get to shore. He is joined by Jess who asks for help killing the dragon. Sedric is conflicted but ultimately decides to kill Jess. A fight ensues, ending when Relpda eats Jess.

Greft confronts Thymara and tells her she must choose a man to mate with to avoid conflict within the keepers, but she refuses. He reveals that Jerd is pregnant.

The keepers are rescued by the Tarman and its crew, who found Warken dead along the river bank. Alise discovers a locket in Sedric’s things that contains a portrait of Hest and a lock of his hair. She assumes this locket is a gift from Hest to her. She begins a relationship with Leftrin.

Carson finds Sedric on the river and they rejoin the Tarman. Alise asks Sedric about the locket and he reveals the affair he was having with Hest.

Tats and Thymara kiss but Thymara says she is not ready to make a choice. Carson and Sedric also begin a relationship.

The dragons reveal that by giving their keepers a taste of their blood, they can turn their keepers into Elderlings. This prompts a fight between Kalo and Greft when Kalo refuses to turn Greft into an Elderling. Kalo asks for a new keeper and selects Davvie. The silver dragon names himself Spit and requests Carson as his keeper.

Jerd miscarries her baby and Bellin takes the opportunity to remind the women what happens when you get pregnant in the Rain Wilds.

Greft disappears in the night. Carson and Sedric search for him and find that he was attacked and killed by a gallator. They also find that he stole Sedric’s stash of dragon parts and ate them in an attempt to become an Elderling. Sedric confesses to Carson that he was planning on selling dragon parts, and when they return to the Tarman, he confesses to Alise as well.

Thymara confronts Sintara about her back wounds and Sintara reveals that she is growing wings. Thymara is upset by this and she and Sintara begin to argue. Their argument is interrupted by Rapskal and Heeby descending from the skies - Heeby has learned to fly and has found Kelsingra, only a few days journey away.

The dragons arrive at the banks of Kelsingra and Sintara takes her first flight.

== Characters ==
- Alise Kincarron Finbok – one of the main protagonists, a self-taught scholar of dragons.
- Thymara – one of the main protagonists, keeper to Sintara.
- Sintara – one of the main protagonists, a blue dragon (Thymara's dragon).
- Captain Leftrin – one of the main protagonists, Captain of the barge Tarman.
- Sedric – one of the main protagonists, secretary to Hest Finbok, he is assigned to accompany Alise Finbok on her journey.
- Tats – keeper of the dragon Fente, childhood friend of Thymara and a former slave.
- Sylve – keeper of the dragon Mercor.
- Rapskal – keeper of the dragon Heeby.
- Greft – keeper of the dragon Kalo. In his mid twenties, he is the oldest keeper and their unofficial leader.

Minor Characters

- Carson Lupskip – a hunter and an old friend of Leftrin's.
- Davvie – a hunter (bowman) and nephew to Carson.
- Jess – a hunter.
- Ranculos – a scarlet, male dragon kept by Harrikin.
- Sestican – an azure, male dragon, kept by Lecter.
- Mercor – a golden dragon, tended by Sylve. Implied to have previously been the sea serpent Maulkin.
- Heeby – a small red dragon queen, tended by Rapskal.
- Jerd – keeper of the dragon Veras, she is implied to be promiscuous.
- Fente – a green dragon queen with a nasty temperament, tended by Tats.
- Veras – a green dragon queen, tended by Jerd.
- Arbuc – Alum's silver-green dragon.
- Kalo – a blue-black male dragon, the largest of their clan, tended by Greft.
- Spit – an unclaimed, stunted silver dragon with a wounded tail.
- Relpda – an unclaimed, sickly copper dragon queen.
- Tinder – a lavender dragon, tended by Nortel.
- Baliper – a red dragon, tended by Warken.
- Kase – a dragon keeper, cousin to Boxter.
- Boxter – a dragon keeper, cousin to Kase.
- Alum – a dragon keeper to Arbuc.
- Nortel – a dragon keeper to Tinder; one of Greft's closest supporters.
- Warken – keeper of the dragon Baliper.
- Harrikin – a dragon keeper to Ranculos, foster brother to Lecter. He is the second oldest keeper at 20 years.
- Lecter – a dragon keeper to Sestican, foster brother to Harrikin.
- Skelly – Deckhand on Tarman and niece of Leftrin.
- Big Eider – Deckhand on Tarman.
- Hennesey – Mate on Tarman.
- Hest Finbok – Husband of Alise Finbok, a rich and important Bingtown trader.
- Swarge – Tillerman of the barge Tarman.
- Bellin – Wife to Swarge, a poleman on Tarman.
- Tarman – A liveship river barge made from wizardwood.
