= Duchy of Estonia =

The Duchy of Estonia may refer to:

- Duchy of Estonia (1219–1346) – Hertugdømmet Estland, a Dominum directum of King of Denmark
- Duchy of Estonia (1561–1721) – Hertigdömet Estland, a dominion of the Kingdom of Sweden
- Duchy of Estonia (1721–1917) or Governorate of Estonia – Эстляндская губерния, Estlyandskaya guberniya, a viceroyalty of the Russian Empire
