= Rain Wild Chronicles =

Quartet of fantasy novels by Robin Hobb

- UK edition
- Dragon Keeper; Dragon Haven; City of Dragons; Blood of Dragons
- Author: Robin Hobb
- Cover artist: Jackie Morris
- Country: United Kingdom
- Language: English
- Genre: Fantasy
- Publisher: Voyager (UK)
- Published: 2009–13
- Preceded by: Tawny Man trilogy
- Followed by: Fitz and the Fool trilogy

The Rain Wild Chronicles is a quartet of fantasy novels by American author Robin Hobb, published from 2009 to 2013. It is her fourth series of novels set in the fictional Realm of the Elderlings, taking place between the Tawny Man and Fitz and the Fool trilogies. Introducing an almost entirely new cast of characters, Hobb chronicled the re-emergence of dragons in the Rain Wilds region and examined the reaction of humans to a new predator in the world.

Reviewers welcomed Hobb's return to the setting of the Liveship Traders, and writer Lisa Goldstein called the Rain Wilds a "strange and fascinating place". Hobb's characterization of dragons received praise. Her human characters in the first book drew mixed reactions, but the sequels fared better; the second book in particular was described by Elizabeth Bear as "highly successful". Scholar Lenise Prater noted the series' depiction of gay relationships and wrote that Hobb promoted queer themes, but felt that her writing was conservative due to its negative portrayal of promiscuity. The first book's pacing was criticized by several reviewers, but the plot of the sequels and the conclusion of the series were well received.

== Background ==
Hobb said that in writing about dragons, she was motivated by a "what-if" scenario: "What if the human race had to contend with another set of intelligent beings, ones that would compete with them for territory [...] What if they didn't respect our claims to own things any more than we respected the claims of elephants or wolves or – dare I say it? – indigenous, so-called primitive people?" She originally conceived the story as a single, standalone book. However, to its length, it was published as two volumes: Dragon Keeper (2009) and Dragon Haven (2010). Hobb then planned to write one more title in the same setting. A similar issue occurred with its length, which resulted in the release of two further entries, City of Dragons (2012) and Blood of Dragons (2013). All four books were published by HarperCollins Voyager in the UK, with covers illustrated by Jackie Morris. The series is variously titled as the Rain Wild Chronicles and the Rain Wilds Chronicles.

== Plot ==
The Rain Wild Chronicles take place in the Rain Wilds of the Realm of the Elderlings. The Rain Wilds are a large, marshy territory to the southwest of Chalced. The books in this series occur between the Liveship Traders Trilogy and the Tawny Man Trilogy of Robin Hobb.

Dragons have returned to the Rain Wilds. The Dragon Queen Tintaglia and her mate Icefyre have left the Bingtown Traders and Rain Wilders to tend their weak, flightless, helpless offspring. It is rapidly apparent that the young dragons pose everyone more harm than anyone can afford or contain and it is decided that they must be moved.

The goal is to deliver the dragons to the mythical Elderling city of Kelsingra. A group of people come together to usher the young dragons up the uncharted waters of the Rain Wilds. The journey is treacherous to everyone, dragon and dragon keeper alike. With doubt of the city of Kelsingra's existence accompanying the expedition, they are plagued by the dangers of the region and the greed of men alike.

Self-discovery and memory feature strongly as themes throughout the plot, along with the exploration of the physical world. Even when they do reach the destination of the mythical city, their trials continue until they are collectively able to plumb the depths of their ancestral memories to help them unlock the secrets buried in Kelsingra. Time is against them, between the city wanting to keep its secrets, and the humans hunting the dragons for their blood and scales.

If the dragon keepers fail at their mission, dragons may face extinction.

== Style and themes ==
Memory is a recurring motif in the magic system of Hobb's world: the dragons, in particular, retain memories of all their ancestors. The series explores ecological themes, as the return of the dragons is seen as important to maintain the natural balance. Mariah Larsson writes further that the series is ecocentric in nature, as while the dragons help enable the utopian civilization of the Elderlings, they also deplete natural resources, have an adverse, mutative effect on the humans around them, and are a stronger and more intelligent predator than humans. She argues that the thematic role of dragons in the Elderlings world is to "give competition to the human drive to dominate", and thus the series challenges anthropocentrism, or the supremacy of man's place in the world.

== Reception ==
Hobb's return to the setting of the Liveship Traders was welcomed by reviewer George Williams, who referred to her as "the modern queen of the fantasy trilogy" and felt that the Liveship Traders was her best work. Writer Lisa Goldstein found the Rain Wilds a "strange and fascinating place", highlighting its treetop dwellings set above the deadly Rain Wild River, and said that the setting differentiated the series from the typical fantasy novel. Nisi Shawl agreed, writing that Hobb's world was "delightfully complex", and commented that readers would be drawn in by its "marvelous interplay of power, magic and beauty".

Dragon Keeper's "flawed characters" drew praise from Williams, who suggested that their weaknesses made their victories "all the more remarkable and precious". Goldstein took a more mixed view, writing that while Hobb's human protagonists were interesting, they repeatedly emulated "the Cinderella story" in being unhappy outcasts. Author Elizabeth Bear criticized the first book's characters as "self-absorbed and static" and felt that it had a young adult tone, but praised their evolution in Dragon Haven, which she described as "highly successful" and centered around character development. The Contra Costa Times' Clay Callam agreed, writing that the second book in particular saw Hobb "on top of her craft". Reviewing the third book, Shawl commented positively on the protagonists' "appealing stubbornness and bravery", and a Free-Lance Star review of the fourth book added that Hobb's talent lay in creating "characters that feel real". Bear also highlighted the conversations between pigeon keepers in the background of the series, calling it a "deeply entertaining political gloss".

According to fantasy scholar Lenise Prater, while the Rain Wild quartet "promotes acceptance of queer relationships", it is limited by "conservative impulses". She notes the existence of several gay relationships in the series and remarks that the gay couple Sedric and Carson have a bond that deepens over the course of the books. Sex between gay characters is described as explicitly as with heterosexual couples. Yet she concludes that the series is conservative, because all its relationships – whether gay or straight – are "monogamous and based on romantic love"; characters who stray from this notion, such as the promiscuous Jerd, are portrayed negatively. She also comments that child rearing is limited to heterosexual couples and that gay women are absent.

Hobb's portrayal of dragons was well received. Bear expressed delight at their snarkiness, and their "crabby, whiny, self-centered, vain, and generally unprepossessing" nature. The Monroe News-Star commented that Hobb's dragons were different from the ones typically seen in fantasy, as they blended dragon-like "mystical grandeur" with human flaws arising from their stunted nature, which made them unable to fly. The reviewer found their growth in the second book interesting, writing that they had progressed closer to the beings of myth but retained flaws which he compared to "the chink in Smaug's armor".

The pacing of the first book was criticized by multiple reviewers. Williams faulted its unresolved nature, suspecting that it was part of a larger story that had been cut into two parts. In a more positive review of the second book, Bear praised Hobb's "sheer inventiveness" in consolidating plot threads, and highlighted how changes in the setting mirrored internal developments in Hobb's characters. Goldstein agreed that the pacing had improved and labelled the second book "exciting, full of adventure", but found the ending predictable and concluded that it left her with "a vague taste of disappointment". Callam praised Hobb's "command of narrative" in the third volume, and a review in The Age remarked on her "talent for action sequences". Reviewing the concluding volume, the British Fantasy Society reviewer Elloise Hopkins called it a "superb end" to the series.

The first book's prose was critiqued by Bear, who said that Hobb was typically a "fine stylist", but felt that her writing in Dragon Keeper suffered from too much exposition. Goldstein agreed, describing Hobb's prose as "a little tired" in Dragon Keeper, but commented that the second book featured tighter writing.

== Works cited ==
- Larsson, Mariah (2021). "Bringing Dragons Back into the World: Dismantling the Anthropocene in Robin Hobb's The Realm of the Elderlings". In Höglund, Anna; Trenter, Cecilia (eds.). The Enduring Fantastic: Essays on Imagination and Western Culture. McFarland & Company. ISBN 978-1-4766-8012-5.
- Melville, Peter (2018). "Queerness and Homophobia in Robin Hobb's Farseer Trilogies". Extrapolation. 59 (3): 281–303. doi:10.3828/extr.2018.17. ProQuest 2156322163.
- Prater, Lenise (2016). "Queering Magic: Robin Hobb and Fantasy Literature's Radical Potential". In Roberts, Jude; MacCallum-Stewart, Esther (eds.). Gender and Sexuality in Contemporary Popular Fantasy. Routledge. doi:10.4324/9781315583938. ISBN 978-1-317-13054-3.
- Waller, Rhian (2022). "Fantasy and Ecofeminism". In Vakoch, Douglas A. (ed.). The Routledge Handbook of Ecofeminism and Literature. pp. 490–499. doi:10.4324/9781003195610-49. ISBN 978-1-003-19561-0.
