= David Palumbo =

American illustrator and fine artist

- Born: 1982; Marquette, Michigan, U.S.
- Known for: Fantasy art
- Website: dvpalumbo.com

David Palumbo (born 1982) is an American illustrator and fine artist.

== Life ==
Palumbo is the son of science fiction scholar Donald Palumbo and illustrator Julie Bell, brother of artist Anthony Palumbo, and stepson of illustrator Boris Vallejo. He lives in Philadelphia.

He studied painting at the Pennsylvania Academy of Fine Art in Philadelphia from 2000 to 2004. He was "informally mentored" by Bell and Vallejo and also studied with artist Burt Silverman.

According to the science fiction scholar and critic Gary Westfahl, concluding a short biography late in 2012, "If he continues upon his upward path, Palumbo may be able to prove, unlike his stepbrother Dorian Vallejo, that it is not always a burden to have a famous parent."

== Artwork ==
As an illustrator, Palumbo works mainly in the fantasy and science fiction genres, where he has painted cover art and interior art for dozens of books and magazines as well as numerous illustrations for Magic: The Gathering. Palumbo has also been a regular contributor to Heavy Metal magazine since 2008 as one of the creators involved in the Tarot feature. He has provided artwork for collectible card games, comic covers, album covers, film posters, magazine covers, advertisements, and film preproduction and his artwork has appeared in such publications as Spectrum, ImagineFX, and 2D Artist Magazine. Other clients include Marvel Comics, Tor.com, Lucasfilm, Night Shade Books, Pyr, and Road Runner Records. His client list also includes Acclaim Entertainment, Black Library, Riley Films, Science Fiction Book Club, Solaris Books, Upper Deck Entertainment, and Wizards of the Coast.

He often uses models from the Cabaret Red Light and Revival Burlesque troupes.

Palumbo has also been showing personal works in fine art galleries since 2003. Since then, he has shown in galleries in Philadelphia, New York, Chicago, London, and Paris. In 2010, Brand Studio Press released a collected volume of Palumbo's fine art nudes.
