= Tawny Man trilogy =

Trilogy of fantasy novels by Robin Hobb

- UK edition
- Fool's Errand; The Golden Fool; Fool's Fate
- Author: Robin Hobb
- Cover artist: John Howe
- Country: United Kingdom
- Language: English
- Genre: Fantasy
- Publisher: Voyager
- Published: 2001–2003
- Preceded by: Liveship Traders
- Followed by: Rain Wild Chronicles

The Tawny Man trilogy is a series of novels by American author Robin Hobb, and the third trilogy in the Realm of the Elderlings sequence. Narrated in first person by FitzChivalry Farseer, it follows his life in his mid-thirties, and is set after the events of the Farseer Trilogy and the Liveship Traders.

== Background and publication ==
As the third trilogy in the Realm of the Elderlings series, the events of Tawny Man occur after (and are influenced by) the Farseer and Liveship novels. Hobb described her personal response to going back to Fitz's narrative voice as akin to "putting on a really comfortable pair of jeans", finding it a relaxing writing experience. She stated that her goal was for the trilogy to stand independently of the conclusion of the Farseer novels, following Fitz's life 15 years after its events.

Fool's Errand was published in October 2001 by HarperCollins Voyager in the UK, and in January 2002 by Bantam Spectra in the US. The second volume followed exactly one year later in each country, and was titled The Golden Fool in the UK and Golden Fool in the US. The concluding book, Fool's Fate, was released in October 2003 in the UK, and in February 2004 in the US. The series was marketed as The Tawny Man trilogy, and is also known as the Tawny Man trilogy. The UK covers were illustrated by John Howe, while the US versions were designed by Stephen Youll.

The setting of the Elderlings novels, in particular the Tawny Man trilogy, has been recognized as resembling the Pacific Northwest, where Hobb grew up. Scholar Geoffrey B. Elliott notes that the Out Islands feature ice- and glacier-filled isles as well as a group of people with a matrilineal system of rule; this shares resemblance to Northwestern geography and indigenous cultures. Hobb wrote two further series in the same world: the Rain Wild Chronicles and the Fitz and the Fool trilogy, which the series concluded with in 2017.

== Plot ==
=== Fool's Errand ===
The start of the trilogy finds Fitz in his mid-thirties, living in a cottage with the wolf Nighteyes and his adopted son Hap. Visitors to his home include the Fool, who prompts him to recount memories of life away from society, as well as the minstrel Starling, who shares his bed on occasion. In remembrance of old times, Fitz proceeds on a hunt with Nighteyes and the Fool; however, it ends with Nighteyes' collapse, a first sign in the book of the wolf's aging body. Fitz heals him with the Skill, bringing the wolf back from the brink of death. Fitz nearly dies himself; however, he is saved by the Fool. He is also visited by Chade, who requests his help training prince Dutiful in the Skill; Fitz however refuses, preferring the quietness of life away from the crown.

Fitz eventually returns to Buck at the behest of his son Hap, who wishes to apprentice in the town. He becomes unwittingly embroiled in a quest to find the prince, who has disappeared, and tracks him to a distant estate filled with strange hunting cats. Fitz eventually realizes that the prince is Witted and bonded to a cat; he further discovers that while the animal has the body of a cat, it is controlled by its previous Wit-partner, who moved to the cat's body in violation of its desires. The prince's capture was engineered by a group of Witted called the Piebald, who seek to overthrow the Farseer throne by force. Fitz, the Fool and Nighteyes stand against the Piebald, but suffer injuries; Fitz breaks away with the prince using a series of Skill-pillars and defeats his captors.

On a wintry night, Fitz shares a Wit-dream with Nighteyes where the wolf bounds away alone to hunt in the snow; awakening, he finds that Nighteyes has passed away. Distraught, he returns to Buck.

=== The Golden Fool ===
Fitz's evolving relationships with Dutiful and the Fool form a prominent plot thread of The Golden Fool. Dutiful regards Fitz as a father figure, even displaying jealousy on learning of Hap, his foster son; this catches Fitz unawares, and he agrees to return to Buck and teach Dutiful the Skill. In the castle he meets Thick, a servant who is strong in the Skill, and from whom Fitz learns the location of the remaining Piebald. He encounters and kills them in the city, but is grievously injured and arrested; a group led by Chade smuggle him to the palace and attempt a Skill healing on him. Fitz lies in a coma, but eventually awakens, to find that Dutiful has now learnt his true identity. Fitz is brought almost to a breaking point on hearing what he terms a terrible secret spoken out loud; a secret he kept masked for more than a decade. Recovering, he finds that Dutiful now looks to him in adulation, an emotion Fitz is unused to receiving.

Through these events, Fitz stays masked in the palace as a servant of the Fool, who dresses as Lord Golden. He learns that the Fool spent the events of the Liveship Traders trilogy as a woman, Amber, and that she loves Fitz, carving a ship's masthead in his likeness. Unable to process either of these statements, Fitz testily states to the Fool that he does not desire him physically, in response to which the Fool withdraws. In another plot thread, the Old Blood venture out of their exile to negotiate with Queen Kettricken, resulting in the establishment of a Witted coterie in the court of the Six Duchies.

In a parallel thread, the Narcheska, princess of the Out Islands, visits the Six Duchies in preparation for marriage with Dutiful. She asserts, however, that her marriage is conditioned on Dutiful bringing to her hearth the head of the dragon IceFyre, rumored to be an icy mountain in the north. Dutiful accepts, but the Fool is dismayed, and tries to persuade Fitz that he must instead return the dragons to the world.

=== Fool's Fate ===
Fitz, Dutiful and his Skilled and Witted coteries travel to the Out Islands by ship. Distrusting the Fool's intentions about dragons, Fitz bars him from their travels and leaves him on the shores of Buck before they depart. In the Out Islands, they meet the Narcheska's clans and its neighbors, who harbor distrust for them and their quest. They then journey to Aslevjal to slay the dragon IceFyre, where Fitz is surprised to discover the Fool waiting for him; using the Witness stones, the Fool teleported to the quarry in the Mountain Kingdom, where he persuaded the stone Girl-on-a-Dragon to fly him to Aslevjal. Fitz and the Fool reconcile, despite their opposing goals, and travel in search of IceFyre; however, all they find is an icy land, with little sign of the dragon.

Unknown to them, the Pale Woman, a self-styled White Prophet who claims to see the future, waits underground in the icy caverns of Aslevjal. She has IceFyre imprisoned in chains; it is later revealed that Dutiful's quest was a ploy by her to end the Farseer dynasty as well as to capture the Fool, the true prophet. She succeeds in the latter, torturing the Fool to death. Fitz manages to free the dragon IceFyre, with a battle ensuing between him and a stone dragon Forged by the Pale Woman; the dragon Tintaglia from the Liveship novels flies in to assist. The stone dragon is eventually defeated with the aid of Burrich, who wields the Wit as a weapon, but at the cost of personal injury and death. Fitz finds the Fool dead underground, wearing the crown of the Rooster King; finding a version of the Fool trapped in the crown, he swaps bodies with him and heals the Fool using the Skill.

Much to Fitz's reluctance, the Fool leaves him on a journey to his home Clerres. Over a score of years, Fitz meets and reconciles with Molly; the trilogy ends with them together in Chivalry's former estate.

== Themes ==
Fitz's internal conflicts in the Farseer trilogy – in particular, the sense of shame and trauma that result from his being Witted – have been described by scholars as an allegory for queerness. Fitz leads a closeted life as a Witted practitioner, largely due to his negative experiences with his guardian Burrich, whose shame for being Witted he internalizes. He later meets a like group of Witted outcasts who, akin to a queer support group, impart in him a sense of belonging and self-acceptance for his identity. In an evolution of this narrative, the Tawny Man trilogy shifts focus from Fitz's personal struggle to the larger struggle for equal rights for the Witted.

Fool's Errand features a group of Witted revolutionaries called the Piebalds, who attempt a military uprising against the Farseer throne. While the Piebalds' actions are extremist, even endangering their brethren who disagree with their methods, their perception of the Wit intrigues Fitz. In contrast to his Witted shame, the Piebalds take pride in their identity. Their assertions, which scholar Peter Melville compares to slogans from 1990s queer activism, create a conflict between Fitz's Witted identity and his allegiance to the throne. However, he finally sides with the latter. Melville describes Fitz as "inhibited by the hegemonic hold the state has on him", bound in service to a social structure that denies him the right to live as himself.

Hobb further portrays themes of queerness and otherness through the Fool and his relationship with Fitz. An enigmatic character whose presentation shifts through the series, the Fool appears as a man in the Farseer novels, and as the woman Amber in the Liveship Traders. In Golden Fool, Fitz struggles both with the revelation that the Fool and Amber are the same person and with the Fool's romantic feelings toward him. He reacts negatively, feeling betrayed and disturbed by these revelations, and testily tells the Fool that he is not attracted to men and he does not desire him physically. This conversation creates a rift between them, which is healed only by the end of the series. Ultimately, through the magic of the Skill, Fitz is able to come to terms with the Fool's otherness. In Fool's Fate, when Fitz heals the Fool's battered body and they swap selves, Fitz realizes that the Fool is not completely human. He muses: "That night, I confronted completely his strangeness. [...] in those hours of rebuilding, I realized and accepted him as he was. [...] He was human only in the same way that I was a wolf". This dynamic is further developed in the concluding Fitz and The Fool trilogy.

== Reception ==
Writing in the magazine Tor.com, author Natasha Pulley remarked on how the trilogy built its characterization through details, stating that "Fitz is one of the most meticulously imagined characters I’ve read, in one of the most meticulously imagined worlds". Reviewing the conclusion of The Tawny Man trilogy, The Birmingham Post likewise commented positively on the series' flawed and believable characters. The reviewer critiqued the epilogue as overly long, but otherwise praised the series, describing Hobb as "one of the best writers of the fantasy genre currently operating".

== Sources ==
- Blaschke, Jayme Lynn (2005). Voices of Vision: Creators of Science Fiction and Fantasy Speak. University of Nebraska Press. ISBN 978-0-8032-6239-3.
- Elliott, Geoffrey B. (2015). "Moving beyond Tolkien's Medievalism: Robin Hobb's Farseer and Tawny Man Trilogies". In Young, Helen (ed.). Fantasy and Science Fiction Medievalisms: From Isaac Asimov to A Game of Thrones. Cambria Press. ISBN 978-1-62499-883-6.
- Larsson, Mariah (2021). "Bringing Dragons Back into the World: Dismantling the Anthropocene in Robin Hobb's The Realm of the Elderlings". In Höglund, Anna; Trenter, Cecilia (eds.). The Enduring Fantastic: Essays on Imagination and Western Culture. McFarland. ISBN 978-1-4766-8012-5.
- Melville, Peter (2018). "Queerness and Homophobia in Robin Hobb's Farseer Trilogies". Extrapolation. 59 (3): 281–303. doi:10.3828/extr.2018.17.
- Prater, Lenise (2016). "Queering Magic: Robin Hobb and Fantasy Literature's Radical Potential". In Roberts, Jude; MacCallum-Stewart, Esther (eds.). Gender and Sexuality in Contemporary Popular Fantasy: Beyond Boy Wizards and Kick-Ass Chicks. Routledge. doi:10.4324/9781315583938. ISBN 978-1-317-13054-3.
