= Lynn Flewelling =

American fantasy fiction author

- Born: Lynn Elizabeth Beaulieu; October 20, 1958 (age 67); Presque Isle, Maine, U.S.
- Occupation: Fantasy author
- Writing career
- Genre: Fantasy
- Notable work: Nightrunner Series

Lynn Flewelling (born Lynn Elizabeth Beaulieu on October 20, 1958) is an American fantasy fiction author.

== Biography ==
Born at Presque Isle, Flewelling grew up in northern Maine, United States. She has worked as a teacher, a house painter, a necropsy technician, and a freelance editor and journalist. She has been married to Douglas Flewelling since 1981, and has two sons. She currently lives in Redlands, California, where she continues to write, and offers lectures and creative writing workshops at the University of Redlands. Flewelling is a convert to Thiền Buddhism, having taken her vows with Engaged Buddhist monk Thich Nhat Hanh, and is a practitioner of Buddhist meditation. Flewelling's writings promote feminism and LGBT causes, having said in relation to these topics, "I’ve always believed that people are people, and it’s wrong to discriminate against them just because of what gender or group they fall into."

== Writings ==
Her first Nightrunner novel, Luck in the Shadows, was a Locus Editor's Pick for Best First Novel and a finalist for the Compton Crook Award. Her novels Traitor's Moon (2000) and Hidden Warrior (2004) were both finalists for the Spectrum Award. Her novels are currently published in 13 countries, and in 2005, the first volume of the Japanese-language version of Luck in the Shadows was published. Flewelling is accessible to readers through her website, her LiveJournal blog, her Yahoo! group, and numerous guest appearances at conventions including Comic-Con and Smith College's ConBust. Her work has been praised by other fantasy authors, including George R. R. Martin, Orson Scott Card, Elizabeth Hand, Robin Hobb, and Katherine Kurtz. Independent film company Csquared Pictures has acquired film rights to the first three books in the Nightrunner series, but they have not yet started production.

Flewelling has cited a number of authors as being major influences on her work, including Ray Bradbury, William Faulkner, T. S. Eliot, Homer, Stephen King, Joyce Carol Oates, William Shakespeare, Ernest Hemingway, Mary Renault, Anne Rice, and Arthur Conan Doyle, and has also expressed her admiration for works by additional authors, including Isaac Asimov, William Kotzwinkle, Ellen Kushner, C. S. Lewis, Toni Morrison, Shirley Jackson, E. B. White, J. M. Barrie, and Michael Moorcock.

Flewelling's work has frequently promoted LGBT themes as well as topics related to gender. The protagonists of the Nightrunner books are both bisexual, and Flewelling has stated their creation was in response to the near-absence of LGBT characters in the genre and marginalization of existing ones. The Tamir Triad, combining elements of psychological drama with ghost story horror, features a protagonist who transforms from one sex and gender to the other. Flewelling's works have drawn academic attention in relation to these themes.

== Bibliography ==
=== Novels ===
==== The Nightrunner Series ====
- Luck in the Shadows. Bantam Spectra. 1996. ISBN 0-553-57542-2.
- Stalking Darkness. Bantam Spectra. 1997. ISBN 0-553-57543-0.
- Traitor's Moon. Bantam Spectra. 1999. ISBN 0-553-57725-5.
- Shadows Return. Bantam Spectra. 2008. ISBN 978-0-553-59008-1.
- The White Road. Bantam Spectra. 2010. ISBN 978-0-553-59009-8.
- Casket of Souls. Bantam Spectra. 2012. ISBN 978-0-345-52230-6.
- Shards of Time. Del Rey. 2014. ISBN 978-0-345-52231-3.

==== Tamír Triad ====
- The Bone Doll's Twin. Bantam Spectra. 2001. ISBN 0-00-711307-2.
- Hidden Warrior. Bantam Spectra. 2003. ISBN 0-00-711310-2.
- Oracle's Queen. Bantam Spectra. 2006. ISBN 0-00-711312-9.

=== Shorts ===
- "Letter To Alexi", Prisoners of the Night #9, 1995
- "Raven's Cut", Assassin Fantastic anthology, Martin Greenberg and Alex Potter, ed. DAW Books, 2001
- "The Complete Nobody's Guide to Query Letters", Speculations, 1999; reprinted on SFWA website and in The Writer's Guide to Queries, Pitches and Proposals by Moira Allen, Allsworth Press, 2001
- "Perfection", Elemental: The Tsunami Relief Anthology: Stories of Science Fiction and Fantasy, Steven Savile and Alethea Kontis, ed., Tor Books, 2006
- Glimpses: A Collection of Nightrunner Short Stories. Three Crow Press. 2010. ISBN 978-1-453-62491-3.
