= Stalking Darkness =

1997 book by Lynn Flewelling

- First edition
- Author: Lynn Flewelling
- Cover artist: Gary Ruddell
- Language: English
- Series: The Nightrunner Series
- Genre: Fantasy
- Publisher: Bantam Spectra
- Publication date: February 3, 1997
- Publication place: United States
- Media type: Print (Paperback)
- Pages: 512
- ISBN: 0-553-57543-0
- OCLC: 36388524
- Preceded by: Luck in the Shadows
- Followed by: Traitor's Moon

Stalking Darkness is a fantasy novel by American writer Lynn Flewelling, the second book in her Nightrunner series. It is preceded by Luck in the Shadows and followed by Traitor's Moon, Shadows Return and The White Road.
