= The White Road =

2010 Fantasy novel by Lynn Flewelling

- First edition
- Author: Lynn Flewelling
- Cover artist: Michael Komarck
- Language: English
- Series: Nightrunner
- Genre: Fantasy
- Publisher: Bantam Spectra
- Publication date: May 25, 2010
- Publication place: United States
- Media type: Print (Paperback)
- Pages: 400
- ISBN: 0-553-59009-X
- Preceded by: Shadows Return
- Followed by: Casket of Souls

The White Road is a fantasy novel by American writer Lynn Flewelling, the fifth novel in her Nightrunner series. Set in a fictional universe, the novel follows the adventures of a complex thief and his apprentice. It is preceded by Luck in the Shadows, Stalking Darkness, Traitor's Moon and Shadows Return. The White Road was released on May 25, 2010.

== Plot ==
Having escaped death and slavery in Plenimar, Alec and Seregil want nothing more than to go back to their nightrunning life in Rhíminee. Instead they find themselves saddled with Sebrahn, a strange, alchemically created creature—the prophesied "child of no woman". Its moon-white skin and frightening powers make Sebrahn a danger to all whom Alec and Seregil come into contact with, leaving them no choice but to learn more about Sebrahn’s true nature.

As Sebrahn will never be accepted in the Sarikali, Seregil and Alec travel over to the Bôkthersa clan to talk to a "dragon friend" for guidance. He presents them to his dragon, who immediately recognizes Sebrahn, and tells them that the Hâzadriëlfaie have dragon blood in their veins and that the alchemists hunt them to create a serum to prolong life. As a result, to their problem he counsels that they must destroy Yhakobin's books. At the same time, Ulan's people find Ilar and bring him over to Virrése. He coaxes the story from him and takes Ilar over to Riga to recover the books.

The Hâzadriëlfaie receive word of Sebrahn from the retha'noi and, realizing that Alec is still alive, send the Ebrados, a group of hunters, to retrieve him and Sebrahn, along with Tyrmari, a male witch, as a guide. They catch Alec, Seregil and Micum on Tamír's Road with the help of the local retha'noi and Seregil manages to strike a bargain with them. Their leader, Rieser goes with them over to Riga to get the books and Sebrahn remains as a hostage.

They take board Green Lady and Thero creates a pair of brands for each of them, while Seregil forges warrants of ownership for Micum. On the port they recognize Ulan's Virrése ship and guess that he has come on the same errand. Unfortunately, he gets ahead of them and steals the books from Yhakobin's house the morning before the planned theft. In order to not risk Alec falling into the Ulan's hands, Seregil ventures into Ulan's Riga house alone. Ilar spots him and begs him to forgive him, despite Ulan order that he turn Seregil in on sight. Instead he allows himself to be tricked into revealing the hiding place of the books before Seregil knocks him out.

He meets Rieser, Micum and Alec and they all speed toward the port, hoping to elude the chase, which they do, for a while. When they find out they cannot burn the books, Seregil cuts them in two and each of them takes half. The soldiers find them again and they make a stand at a cottage near the shore. Seregil sneaks out and, after encountering captain Rhal, he returns to the cottage and they all break through, but Rieser catches an arrow in his collarbone.

Back in Skala, Hâzadriën heals him and he announces that he will leave Alec alone as he doesn't believe he'll let himself be caught once again. This is received with anger by the retha'noi who resolve to destroy Sebrahn, which they call an abomination. He calls upon the owls, who blind the retha'noi archers while Sebrahn himself kills the witches. In the aftermath, Alec understands that he has to give up Sebrahn as he cannot care for him and he seems to need the presence of the other tayan'gil. They return to Rhíminee, and resume their Watcher lives.
