= The Nightrunner Series =

Fantasy novel series by Lynn Flewelling

- An official logo for The Nightrunner Series.
- Books: Luck in the Shadows; Stalking Darkness; Traitor's Moon; Shadows Return; The White Road; Glimpses; Casket of Souls; Shards of Time
- Author: Lynn Flewelling
- Country: United States
- Language: English
- Genre: Heroic fantasy
- Publisher: Random House
- Published: August, 1996 – Current
- Media type: Print (Paperback), (Kindle, only available in the United States of America and Canada), Audio (Cassette), (CD/MP3)
- Followed by: The Tamír Triad

The Nightrunner Series is a multi-part series of heroic fantasy novels by American writer Lynn Flewelling. It currently contains seven novels and a collection of related short stories.

'Nightrunning' refers to espionage, the principal occupation of the series' two protagonists, Seregil and Alec. The books also explore sexuality and gender roles, presenting a world where bi- and homosexuality are as accepted as heterosexuality, as well as a realm (Skala) which is ruled by Queens rather than Kings, and in whose army women warriors have a major role.

The series has been published by Bantam Spectra and Del Rey Books. Both companies are owned by Random House, Inc.

A prequel trilogy titled The Tamir Triad, written by Flewelling, takes place centuries beforehand.

== Synopsis ==
=== Luck in the Shadows ===
Seregil rescues Alec, a poor orphaned hunter mistakenly arrested for spying. After hiring Alec to guide him through the Northern Lands, Seregil notes Alec's quick learning ability and fast hands, and offers him a job as his apprentice. Alec, though wary of Seregil at first due to his suspicion that Seregil is a thief or spy, accepts the offer. They fall into a mystery that involves the fast deterioration of Seregil's mind and sanity, and Alec must find a way to save his new teacher and friend. Alec manages to deliver Seregil into the hands of Nysander, a wizard of Skala, but the mystery only deepens. At the same time, a traitorous plot against the Queen seems to be unfolding, and Seregil must solve it quickly before he is found guilty of treason himself.

=== Stalking Darkness ===
The seemingly harmless wooden disc that nearly caused Seregil's death and loss of sanity in Luck in the Shadows is revealed to be part of a broken, evil helm belonging to the 'Eater of Death', a forsaken god named Seriamaius. A plan to retrieve all the pieces of the helm is attempted by a Plenimaran, Mardus, who wishes to use it to conquer Skala and Mycena and rule over the three lands. A prophecy long foretold takes place, and Seregil has to kill his mentor, Nysander, in order to destroy the helm. In the last paragraphs of the book, Seregil, and Alec admit romantic feelings for one another.

=== Traitor's Moon ===
Seregil and Alec are sent to Aurënen, Seregil's homeland, with Princess Klia, in a Skalan delegation to ask for open ports, warriors and supplies in the deepening war between Skala and Plenimar, but the attempted murder of the Princess means trouble. Seregil and Alec must unravel the mystery before all chance of a treaty is ruined. At the same time, Seregil must readjust himself to the country he was exiled from more than thirty years previously.

=== Glimpses ===
A collection of short stories, including the story of how Seregil, Nysander, and Micum all meet.

=== Shadows Return ===
Seregil and Alec are kidnapped by Zengati slave traders and bought by a Plenimaran alchemist. Using Alec's unique blood as a half-Northerner, half-hâzadriëlfaie, the alchemist intends to create a creature called a rhekaro, who appears to be a young child and yet is decidedly inhuman. Seregil eventually escapes with Alec and Sebrahn, while coming to terms with his own past as he reunites with a former lover and enemy.

=== The White Road ===
Having escaped death and slavery in Plenimar, Seregil and Alec want nothing more than to go back to their nightrunning life in Rhíminee. Instead, they find themselves saddled with Sebrahn, a strange, alchemically created creature—the prophesied "child of no woman". Its moon-white skin and frightening powers make it a danger to all whom Seregil and Alec come into contact with, leaving them no choice but to learn more about Sebrahn's true nature. But what then? With the help of old friends and Seregil's clan, the pair sets out to discover the truth about this living homunculus—a journey that can lead only to danger... or death. For Seregil's old nemesis Ulan í Sathil of Virèsse and Alec's own long-lost kin (Hâzadrielfaie) are after them, intent on possessing both Sebrahn and Alec. On the run and hunted, Alec and his friends must fight against time to accomplish their most personal mission ever.

=== Casket of Souls ===
As noble spies working on behalf of the crown, Alec and Seregil work as intelligence agents. The political situation becomes complicated as the two discover a plot that pits Queen Phoria against Princess Klia during the war between the kingdom of Plenimar. On the other hand, there is a mysterious outbreak of plague in the city of Rhíminee, and they begin investigating the connection between the disease and the political plot.

=== Shards of Time ===
The last novel in the series. The governor of the sacred island of Kouros and his wife have been killed inside a locked and guarded room. The sole witnesses to the crime—guards who broke down the door, hearing the screams from within—have gone mad with terror, babbling about ghosts and other supernatural phenomena. Dispatched to Kouros by the queen, master spies Alec and Seregil encounter excitement and danger, including an ancient evil has been awakened there: a great power that will not rest until it has escaped its prison and taken revenge on all that lives. Alec and Seregil must find a way to stop it and save the island and its residents from certain doom.

== Characters ==
=== Seregil í Korit Solun Meringil Bôkthersa ===
Seregil is one of the protagonists and a full-blooded Aurënfaie. He is 57 at the beginning of the series, but looks 25 because of his people's long lifespan though according to him he would be not much older than Alec if human and has not yet reached the age of maturity. He is described as medium height and fair-skinned with grey eyes and dark brown hair.

After being seduced by Ilar í Sontir into breaking atui during a treaty and accidentally killing a man, he is exiled to Skala by the rhui'auros request where he becomes a Watcher, a spy in the queen's service. As a Watcher, he has many personas: Aren Windover, a bard known in the north; Lord Seregil of Rhíminee, a noble in Skalan court; the Rhíminee Cat, a burglar for nobles of the Skalan court in Luck in the Shadows.

Seregil is a skilled lover and has had numerous sexual relations with both men and women—though with a clear preference for men. However, he did not find real love until meeting Alec.

=== Alec í Amasa ===
Alec is the son of Amasa and Ireya ä Shaar, He is a ya'shel because of his mother's Hâzadrielfaie blood and his father's human blood. A boy of sixteen at the beginning of the series, he is described as being very like Seregil in size, not tall, slender, blond and blue-eyed. Because of his looks and his conservative Dalnan upbringing, he is generally perceived as naive and innocent, though he shows great intelligence and cunning over the books.

He is captured and thrown in prison where he meets Seregil. After Seregil helps him escape he contracts Alec to guide him to Wolde. Impressed by Alec's talent and intelligence, he asks Alec to be his apprentice and learn "the acquisition of goods and information".

=== Cavish Family ===
==== Micum Cavish ====
A master swordsman and dear friend of Seregil who met Seregil years before the events of Luck in the Shadows. At the beginning of the series he is in his forties. Already settled down with a family of three, later four children and a foster son, he does not always accompany Seregil on his adventures. Micum himself is a Watcher and father of Beka, Elsbet, Illia and Gherin. At the end of Stalking Darkness, he and his wife Kari adopt Luthas.

==== Kari Cavish ====
She is married to Micum and mother of Beka, Elsbet, Illia, Gherin and later, Luthas. She runs the farm and house at Watermead since Micum is almost always away. She used to have a rivalry with Seregil, since they were both in love with Micum at the same time, and since he used to arrive and steal Micum away on Watcher business for months at a time, but Micum chose her. Seregil is like a brother to Micum now, and Kari like a sister, or sometimes a mother.

==== Beka ä Kari Thallia Grelenda of Watermead ====
Eldest daughter of Micum and Kari, she is a Commander in the Queen's Horse Guard. She is held in high regard by Commander Klia and the officers under her. A major love interest of hers is Nyal in Traitor's Moon—later her husband. She is skilled with a bow, a sword, close quarters combat and tracking, and is a devious tactician, as she learned from her father. She becomes a Watcher in Traitor's Moon.

==== Elsbet Cavish ====
Second oldest daughter of the Cavish family, she is interested in knowledge and literature. With Lord Seregil's help, she becomes an initiate studying at Illior's temple in Skala.

==== Illia Cavish ====
Youngest daughter of the Cavish family, she is the most "ladylike" and interested in marriage and running a home and the court, out of all the sisters. After her older sisters leave home, she helps her mother with Luthas and Gherin and running the household. She was named after Seregil's mother. In Casket of Souls, her life is in grave danger, and she is saved by her father and his companions with great effort and risk.

==== Gherin Cavish ====
Born at the end of Stalking Darkness, he is named by Seregil Gherin, which means 'early blessing' in Aurënfaie.

=== Wizards ===
==== Nysander ====
Nysander is the last disciple and heir of Arkoniel and guardian of the necromancer Helm. He is described as kind and eccentric. Thero is his apprentice—Nysander being disappointed with Thero's often cold and arrogant attitude, but nevertheless regards him as having great potential (which in fact would be realized only after Nysander's death).

He was the first to befriend Seregil after his exile from Aurënen and offered him an apprenticeship at the Orëska House. When that did not work, he hired him as a Watcher, one of the spies under his command.

In Stalking Darkness, Nysander requests (indeed demands and orders) Seregil to kill him—as that is the only way to finally destroy the evil Helm. After this he appears twice more in visions to offer guidance.

==== Thero í Procepios ====
Thero is a wizard who was Nysander's apprentice after Seregil. At first he and Seregil are bitter rivals, but become more respectful of each other after the events of Stalking Darkness. Originally cold and arrogant, his character gradually changes and he strives to emulate the generous character of the dead Nysander. He becomes head of the Watchers after Nysander's death. He and Princess Klia fall in love with each other—the first ever relationship between a wizard and a member of the Skalan Royal family—and at the end of Shards of Time, they have a baby daughter, the first known case of a wizard having a child (made possible by a magical dragon biting Thero).

==== Magyana ====
A powerful Wizard of the Third Oreska and once Nysander's love interest, and his soul mate, despite her being celibate and him taking other women as lovers. After Nysander's death, she takes over Thero's apprenticeship.

=== Skalan Royal Family ===
==== Queen Idrilain the Second ====
Mother of Klia and Phoria and Queen of Skala at the beginning of the series. Mortally wounded by a Plenimaran arrow, she holds on long enough to send Princess Klia on the vital mission to re-establish relations with Aurënen—since she does not trust Phoria, her eldest daughter and heir, to do it.

==== Queen Phoria ====
Eldest Princess of Skala, inherited the throne after Idrilain's passing. She managed to push back the Plenimarians back into their homeland, but died on the threshold of victory. She wanted to conquer Plenimar so that the land could see a peace that lasted without threat. Under her rule, even though Aurenen were allies, the style of the Aurenfaie went out of fashion. She tried to alienate all things not Skalan, including magic, and saw it as doing more harm than good.

==== Korathan ====
Son of Idrilain, twin of Phoria, to whom he was devoted. Was Seregil's first lover after he was exiled to Skala. While the Skalan system of having only Queens excluded him from the throne, he was appointed Viceregent, taking care of the Skalan home front while his mother and sister were busy on the front with Plenimar. One of the most powerful people in Skala.

==== Klia ä Idrilain Elesthera Klia Rhíminee ====
Klia is the only surviving child of Queen Idrilain and her last consort, the youngest princess of her generation. She is 23 years old at the beginning of the series. She is the Commander of the Queen's Horse Guard, respected by most as a competent tactician and fighter. Falling in love with Thero (and vice versa), she succeeds in convincing him to consummate their unprecedented love. Having no design on the throne, she does not use the occasion of being in command of the victorious army after Queen Phoria's death in battle to seize power for herself. Rather, she orderly hands power to her young niece Elani, Phoria's designated heir.

==== Elani ====
Designated at a young age to be heir to the throne of Queen Phoria. Her mother—and heir apparent—Aralain, was considered unsuitable to lead. Intensively trained by her aunt in both war and statecraft, she rises to the throne at the age of sixteen, following her aunt's death in battle. She proves a capable and sensitive ruler; developing a strong friendship with Alec, due especially to their shared passion for archery.

=== Aurënfaie ===
==== Nyal í Nhekai Beritis of Ra'Basi ====
Nyal is introduced as the interpreter for the Skalan soldiers who are assigned as Klia's royal guard in her visit to Aurënen in Traitor's Moon. He is a traveler of many lands, knowing many languages and understanding the customs and cultures of many people. He is a capable fighter and is a soldier when needed. He becomes a love interest of Beka's in Traitor's Moon, eventually her husband and fellow-fighter in the war with Plenimar.

==== Ilar í Sontir of Chyptaulos ====
Ilar, also known as Khenir, was introduced in Shadows Return, although mentioned often in previous books.

Seregil's first lover, Ilar seduced him at Ulan í Sathil's bidding and manipulated him into breaking his clan's atui, when Seregil was 22 years old. As a consequence Seregil was exiled from Aurënen. After his escape, Ilar was caught by Ulan and sold into slavery in Plenimar. He spent 40 years under the false name Khenir, blaming Seregil for his condition. Seeking revenge, he helped his master, Yakhobin, catch Seregil and Alec. Once under his possession, Ilar physically, psychologically and sexually abused Seregil. But later he helped Seregil and Alec escape when his master vowed to sell him back in the slave market.

Found again by Ulan's men, he was taken back to Viresse in The White Road, where the khirnari came to know of the story of the rhekaro. Ulan took him back to Plenimar to help him steal Yakhobin's books. Later Seregil tricked Ilar into giving him the location of the books but left him in Plenimar as revenge for what Ilar did to Alec.

==== Adzriel ä Illia ====
Adzriel ä Illia is Seregil's oldest sister and has acted as a mother figure for him. After her father, she becomes the khirnari of the Bôkthersa. Though he is officially no longer a member of the clan, Adzriel offers him (and Alec) a warm welcome in his ancestral home.

==== Ulan í Sathil ====
Ulan í Sathil is the khirnari of the Virèsse clan. Until the events of Traitor's Moon, his clan held monopoly over trade with Skala and as a result holds a grudge against Seregil and Alec for enabling the opening of Gedre. He is 270 years old and suffers from a sickness of the lungs and severe arthritis. He is found to be involved in extensive secret dealings with the Plenimarans, including a tacit complicity with the enslavement of Aurënfaie from other clans—while striving to ransom and repatriate enslaved members of his own clan. He is described as cunning, ruthless and devoted to his clan's welfare. He dies in Riga at the end of The White Road, Seregil and Alec deciding not to reveal what they know of his dark deeds.

==== Riagil í Molan Uras Illien Gedre ====
The Khirnari of Gedre. Knew Seregil when he was very young.

=== Rekharos ===
Rekharos or tayan'gil (silver blood) are humanoid creatures created from the blood of the Hâzadrielfaie. They can heal, though no one except Sebrahn can speak or bring back the dead.

==== Sebrahn ====
A rhekaro, Sebrahn is described as very pale with silver-colored eyes and shining white hair. Because of his appearance, Alec named him moonlight in Aurënfaie.

The prophesied child of no woman, Sebrahn was created in Shadows Return by the Plenimaran alchemist Yhakobin for Ulan í Satil in hopes of distilling a healing elixir to prolong his life. He was created using Alec's Hâzadrielfaie blood, and as a result is only able to feed by drinking Hâzadrielfaie blood. Alec took him along when he escaped the alchemist's house.

Later Alec let him be taken into the care of the Hâzadrielfaie in The White Road when he realised that could not continue his lifestyle and still care for Sebrahn.

==== Hâzadriën ====
Another rhekaro, he was made from the blood of Hâzadriël herself and has since hunted with the Ebrados by her wish. He is pale and silver-haired like Sebrahn, though he does not speak, and has wings.

== Significant Places ==
=== Skala ===
Capital: Rhíminee. Ruled by: Queen Idrilain, then Queen Phoria and finally Queen Elani.

Location: To the north is the Inner Sea and Mycena, to the east is Plenimar and The Strait of Bal, to the south is Aurënen and to the west is the Oisiat Sea and Zangat.

Significant Cities: Ero (former capital), Cirna, Ardinlee and Tes.

==== Rhíminee ====
The capital of Skala, it holds the Royal Palace, the Skalan Court and the Orëska. It is also where The Cockerel Inn and Wheel Street are located. Rhíminee was founded by Queen Tamir the Great (who was personally involved in the details of city planning) after the earlier capital Ero was destroyed by the Plenimarans. Rhíminee has strong defenses, to ensure that this would not happen again, and in some earlier wars they were severely tested. There are the double walls forming a ring around the city, plentiful supplies ready for the possibility of a siege, and streets designed for defense against any attacker who might breach the outer defences. Rhíminee also has a sophisticated sewage system—a lesson from the bad sewage of the earlier capital which had been nicknamed "Stinking Ero". In peacetime, Rhíminee is a major trading port through which enormous wealth passes daily. This wealth is divided unequally—there is an enormous disparity between the rich quarters at the northern part and the slums to the south; Alec and Seregill are at home in both, with some preference for the poorer areas.

==== The Orëska House ====
Technically the Third Orëska House, it is commonly referred to simply as ″the Orëska″ and is the home of all wizards. Though some choose not to live there, like Magyana who travels a lot, most do, choosing to be among their own kind, with all the resources and amenities that are provided. It has many libraries and rooms filled with books in numerous languages, a vault of ancient and magical artifacts, state-of-the-art baths and rooms for master wizards, their students, apprentices and servants. The garden within the Orëska grounds is constantly in a sunny summer state through magical means. When Nysander was alive, he inhabited one of the towers, using up several rooms and floors, along with his apprentice Thero and his servant Wethis.

==== Wheel Street ====
In the Upper City on the edge of the Noble's Quartet, Lord Seregil owns a house on Wheel Street that is referred to simply as "Wheel Street". He and Alec live and host court events there when they are in the city, or if it makes practical sense for them as Watchers. Runcer is a full-time butler who lives in and cares for the house. After he passes on, his grandson Runcer the younger takes over. He also covers for Lord Seregil and Lord Alec when he needs to, never asking questions. During Sakor Festival or when they're in the city, the Cavish family stays here. Two large white Zangeti hounds named Mârag and Tir also live here.

==== The Cockerel Inn ====
When in Rhíminee, Seregil and Alec usually stay here in the Lower City, since they can come and go at all hours unobserved. There is a full-time staff who run the Inn a family. They operate efficiently and are always helpful to Seregil and Alec, never asking questions about their eccentricities and never shocked by the strange things they require. Up the back staircase that leads to the attic, where the managing family lives, with a secret door and apartment concealed by magic from both the outside and inside, and with magic security codes in Aurënfaie, set in place by Nysander. Inside are a huge living room with a dining area, a study, and many books and tools, filled with knickknacks Seregil has picked up throughout his travels and a large bedroom. Before Seregil and Alec were involved, Alec had a bed in the main living room. Towards the end of Stalking Darkness, the managing family is murdered by Plenimaran spies who tracked down Seregil. Upon discovering their bodies in his inner sanctum, he finds Luthas, then burns the place down as their funeral pyre. Originally intending never to return to a place with such painful memories, at the end of Traitor's Moon, Alec and Seregil decide they really do miss and need this home, so they will rebuild it. They call the new one "The Stag and Otter", inspired by Seregil and Alec's animal forms from Nysander's intrinsic nature spell. Linking the old and new inns is the surviving cat, Ruatha.

==== Watermead ====
Less than a day's ride north of Rhíminee, it is the land the royal family gave Micum Cavish in gratitude for his work as a Watcher for Skala. Seregil and Alec come here often to get away from busy city life, and are part of the family.

=== Mycena ===
Location: North of the Inner Sea and Skala and west of Plenimar.

Significant Cities and Towns: Isil, Wyvern Dug, Nanta, Keston, Wolde, Boersby, Stook and Kerry. Parts of the war between Plenimar and Skala are fought there. Alec spent most of his youth in towns and villages north of or in Mycena, although he usually says he's from Kerry. Mycena is militarily much weaker than Skala and Plenimar, and depends on Skala during the frequent wars. Wars between Skala and Plenimar usually take place mainly on Mycenan soil, causing great hardship to the country's civilian population. Mycenans and Skalans speak essentially the same language and can understand each other, while Plenimarans speak a completely different language.

=== The Golden Road ===
Location: North of Mycena. "The Golden Road" is the unofficial collective name for a cluster of towns and minor principalities that have no central government and are scattered to the north of Mycena, up to the mountains behind which lies the forbidden land of the Hâzadrielfaie. Inhabitants have many linguistic and cultural similarities with the Mycenans, and indeed there is some ambiguity as whether or not it should count as part of Mycena. Much of this area is thinly inhabited, and there are many wild parts where the only humans are itinerant hunters such as Alec's father (and Alec himself in his early years). Kerry, Alec's hometown, is part of this region. So is the Domain of Asengai, where Alec and Seregil were imprisoned and first met. The most important part is the rich and prosperous city-state of Wolde. The Golden Road gets its name from the gold—as well as other commodities (wine, wool)—that goes southwards, mainly by river, through this trade route. This makes the Golden Road a valuable economic and strategic asset, a regular bone of contention in the wars between Skala and Plenimar. During Luck in the Shadows, the Plenimarans are well on their way to secure effective control of the Golden Road—using more diplomacy and less blunt force than normal, and especially working hard to woo the Mayor of Wolde. Later books mention heavy fighting at the Golden Road, but it takes place offstage and is not described in detail. The war ends with Plenimar forced to cede any possessions beyond its own borders, which means that Skala gained effective control of the Golden Road—though Plenimar is sooner or later likely to dispute that in a new war.

=== Plenimar ===
Capital: Benshâl. Ruled by: Ashnazai family, who bear the title "Overlord" rather than "King".

Location: A peninsula east of Skala and the Inner Sea, southeast of Mycena; only the Gatchwayd Ocean lies to the east and south. Repeatedly at war with Skala, it is the home to a harsh people who keep slaves and among whom necromancers practice dark rites.

Much of Plenimar is arid—which partly explains why its inhabitants try to conquer other lands. Plenimar is a major naval power, its ships often dominating the seas in wartime and conducting massive raids on Skalan shores. Plenimarans have extensive contacts with lands across the Gatchwayd Ocean to their east—of which other peoples know only little. In the early Nightrunner books, the depiction of the Plenimarans is wholly negative—its soldiers habitually perpetrating atrocities and civilians at home maintaining extensive slave markets. In later books, there is some effort at creating a more nuanced picture: Some Plenimarans greatly dislike the necromancers employed by their Overlord, and Princess Klia speaks of some honorable Plenimaran officers. In Casket of Souls, the Plenimarans sue for peace and it is the Skalan Queen Phoria who rejects these overtures and prolongs the fighting. The final book, Shards of Time, introduces a positive Plenimaran character, a doctor who is humane, dedicated to healing her people, opposed to slavery and descended from a like-minded family. From the glimpse of history given in Shards of Time, it seems that originally, when Skala and Plenimar were parts of the old Hierophantic realm, there were few cultural differences between them. However, the cataclysmic appearance of the monstrous Rhazat, "Mother of Necromancy", precipitated a civil war. Though Rhazat herself was trapped in a "shard of time" through the self-sacrifice of the last Hierophant, Rhazat's sinister disciples eventually took firm control of Plenimar, while being decisively repelled from Skala and Mycena. The opponents to the civil war eventually congealed into the separate, mutually hostile realms seen in later times.

=== Aurënen ===
Location: South of Skala and the Osiat Sea, east of Zengat; to the south and east lies only Gatchwayd Ocean.

Significant Clans/Territories: Bôkthersa, Silmai, Haman, Datsia, Lhapnos, Akhendi, Gedre, Khatme, Goliníl, Virésse, Bry'kha.

Aurënen has no true central government, its inhabitants divided into numerous self-governing clans, each of which has divergent economic interests and considerable social and cultural differences from each other. (For example, the Khatme tend to be fanatic in religious matters and consider Skalans blasphemous for combining the worship of Aura/Illior with that of other gods; other clans are more tolerant.) They have no aristocracy other than the khirnari heading each clan, who is elected for life (which may be a very long time). The closest they have to a central government is the Ia'sidra, a council of the eleven most powerful khirnari that meets at Sarikali, a holy city fully intact and abandoned by an ancient race—serving as neutral ground for settling disputes between the clans and for celebrations. Deliberations of the Ia'sidra can be long and cumbersome before a decision is reached—the main theme of Traitor's Moon. When the Is'sidra is not in town, Sarikali is deserted, save for ghosts of the ancients and omniscient priests.

All magic is commonly considered to come from Aurënen, which is considered as "The First Orëska" (a view that ignores the little-known—and no less potent—Retha'noi magic). All Skalan wizards have some Aurënfaie ancestry—and since wizards cannot have children, in order to have new wizards Skala needs Aurënfaie to continue having relations with Skalans (with or without a formal marriage) and have Skalan children. However, some in Aurënen dislike and distrust the Skalan wizards and the variations they have made to the original Aurënen magic—which was an underlying reason for the "Edict of Separation".

Traditionally, Aurënen (in particular, the clan of Bôkthers—not coincidentally Seregil's clan) were considered allies of Skala in its wars with Plenimar, and often this alliance was crucial for Skala's survival. As depicted in the Tamir Triad, help from Aurënen was also crucial in helping Tamir the Great gain her throne. The alliance was tightened with Queen Idrilain the First taking an Aurënfaie Consort. This, however, precipitated a reaction from Skalan bigots, who after the Queen's death assassinated her Consort—which in turn led to a counter-reaction by those in Aurënen who frowned at close relations with Skala. This led to 200 years of the "Edict of Separation", when relations between Aurënen and the outside world were almost completely cut off—only Virésse remaining open to foreign traders. With the renewal of major warfare with Plenimar, changing this situation was vital for Skala's survival—and Princess Klia managed to change this (despite considerable difficulties, and with the great help of Seregil and Alec). The clan of Gedre—far more friendly to Skala than Virésse—was able to open its port to Sklan ships, at least for the duration of the war, and Aurënfaie wanting to volunteer for service in the Skalan army were allowed to do so. That was a turning point in the war, where a Plenimaran victory seemed in the offing, and greatly facilitated Skala's eventual victory.

=== Hâzadrielfaie ===
The Hâzadrielfaie are descended from a group of Aurënfaie who very long ago (even by the standards of these long-lived people) embarked on a mass migration under the leadership of a woman called Hâzadriël (for whom they named themselves), settling in the mountains far north of Mycena and severing all contact with their Aurënfaie kin. Other Aurënfaie had no idea of the reasons for this migration—just that Hâzadriël gathered people from various clans and took them away, never to return. The Hâzadrielfaie keep many Aurënfaie customs, such as being led by an elected khirnari who might be either a man or a woman, wearing the distinctive Aurënfaie headdress, and speaking a dialect of the Aurënfaie language. However, the Hâzadrielfaie are all one clan and have none of the constant competition and rivalry between clans that are central to Aurënen life. More important, in contrast to the customary hospitality of Aurënfaie society, the Hâzadrielfaie are intensely hostile to any strangers straying into their territory, often killing them out of hand (including Aurënfaie who tried to make contact). They have a strong taboo against intermarriage or interbreeding with outsiders, any such act punishable by death and any offspring of such a relationship are ruthlessly pursued and killed. The only exception is the Retha'noi who live in the mountains near the Hâzadrielfaie, who have their own good reasons to distrust outsiders and with whom intermarriage is permitted. In the early books, the Hâzadrielfaie appear negative, a bigoted and xenophobic society—particularly in Glimpses, where the tragic story of Alec's parents is told: how his Hâzadrielfaie mother was killed by her own brothers, how the Hâzadrielfaie sought to kill the baby Alec as well and how Alec's father exacted a terrible revenge. Later the Hâzadrielfaie's point of view is given and the reason for their behavior is revealed: their blood could be used to make creatures called Rekharos, who have enormous healing power. The process of making them is extremely painful and humiliating; Hâzadriël, who had undergone it herself, was determined not to let it happen again, gathering all possessors of that kind of blood, taking them away, and ensuring that they will be no longer available to alchemists. Though determined to prevent new Rekharos from being created, the Hâzadrielfaie take good care of those who already exist. In The White Road, a band of Hâzadrielfaie come into greater contact with the outside world than they had for many generations, and are forced into alliance with Seregil, Alec and Micum—which lessens their prejudice, if only a little.

=== Zengat ===
A desert country located to the west of Aurënen, it is inhabited by clans of nomadic barbarians, some of whom get along with Aurëfaie clans, but are just as likely to ally themselves with Plenimar in a war. Some Zengatis are slavers, constantly kidnapping Aurëfaie and others and selling them in the Plenimaran slave markets. Serengil's father had made a considerable effort to establish peace between Aurëfaie and Zengat. This was foiled by the provocation organized secretly by Ulan í Sathil, which caused Seregil's exile. When starting the war with Skala, the Plenimarans tried to get the Zengati to attack Aurënen, in order to prevent the Aurëfaie aiding Skala—but were prevented due to civil war breaking out among the Zengati clans themselves.

=== Kouros ===
The holy Island of Kouros, in the Inner Sea, was where the Hierophantic people—ancestors of the Skalans, Plenimarans and Mycenians alike—originally settled, arriving from somewhere across the sea to the south, some 1500 years before the time of Alec and Seregil. They were drawn there by an oracle and the strong aura of magic clinging to the island. At the time, the island's soil was fertile (later becoming eroded) and it had extensive forests. From there, the migrants later spread to the lands all around the Inner Sea, but Kouros remained the center of Hierophantic government until it collapsed. The documents describing this cataclysmic event were mostly lost in later wars, and only in the events of Shards of Time is revealed the major role played by the monstrous Rhazat, "Mother of Necromancy". Later, after the Three Kingdoms went their own divergent and contradictory ways, Kouros was a highly sought prize in the wars between Skala and Plenimar—as a prestige object, since both kingdoms claimed the heritage of the lost Hierophantic realm, but also because of Kouros' rich gold mines, not exhausted even after being continually worked for over a thousand years. Queen Phoria prolonged a war with Plenimar for a whole year after the Plenimarans sued for peace, mainly to force them to cede Kouros—which was eventually achieved, but at the price of Phoria's own life. Whatever the outcome of a war, at its end it is customary for Skalans and Plenimarans to conduct the final negotiations on Kouros. No less than eighteen successive Treaties of Kouros are mentioned as having been signed between Skala and Plenimar—each eventually violated, leading to a new war that would be concluded by yet another treaty. There is a permanent population on Kouros, mostly sticking to the island and adapting to whatever rule. Peasants on Kouros still speak a form of Middle Konic—an archaic language, long extinct elsewhere and only studied by scholars. Plenimaran rule on Kouros involves the introduction of slavery and importing new slaves, while Skalan rule brings about emancipation. Seregil made considerable efforts to help the Aurënfae former slaves that he found on the island and encourage them to organize into a new clan. Deep Harbor, Kouros' modern capital, is some distance from the ruins of the old Hierophantic capital. The newly installed Skalan governor's attempt to renovate these ruins resulted in waking up the secretly present Rhazat, leading to the death of the governor and many other people, and only with great effort and sacrifice was the monstrous being finally overcome.

=== The Retha'noi ===
The Retha'noi are the indigenous inhabitants of what became Skala, Mycena and Plenimar. Prior to the arrival of the settlers whom the Retha'noi called "Southlanders", the Retha'noi were intrepid sailors and fishers, many of their holy places located on the seashore. The settlers arrived about 1500 years before the time of Serengil and Alec, first establishing themselves on Kuoros and then spreading in all directions, forcibly uprooting the Retha'noi and driving them off the sea and deep inland. Some of the Retha'noi were assimilated by the conquerors and lost their identity; Skalans were not eager to acknowledge such an ancestry. Those Retha'noi who stubbornly retained their identity ended up living deep in the mountains, where they were able to maintain themselves over the centuries. This was due both to their isolated mountain valleys being easily defended and not particularly desirable real estate, and to the Retha'noi having developed a potent magic of their own, very different from that of the Skalan wizards. Retha'noi's magic is clearly divided between men's magic and women's. Male Retha'noi witches practice their magic mainly through the oo'lu, a nearly body-length horn created in a complicated and meticulous ritual process. The oo'lu is not magical in itself, its function being to focus and amplify the user's inherent magic. Oo'lu music, emulating the sounds made by animals and birds, can be used for a thorough healing. Using the oo'lu, a witch can send an ill person's soul out of the body—preferably on a night of the Full Moon, whose light is considered to be healing and soothing—while the witch can minutely perceive the inside of the patient's body and magically heal many (though not all) diseases and wounds, whereupon the soul is returned to the healed body. The same oo'lu music, however, can be turned into a deadly weapon by the addition of a single sharp note, severing the soul's link to the body and killing instantly. Another application of oo'lu music is to hide the witch himself and people he wants to protect, and render them effectively invisible to pursuing enemies. Female witches do not use the oo'lu. They have their own elaborate magic connected especially with sex and birth, and which might also be turned at need into an offensive weapon. Retha'noi in the mountains of Skala are self-governing, their communities effectively independent of the Skalan Queens' power—a situation tacitly tolerated by the Queens and their officials. The career of Tamir the Great was greatly helped by Retha'noi. It was the female witch Lhel who performed the magic by which the young Tamir was disguised as a boy and saved her from her murderous usurping uncle, and the male witch Mahti saved the lives of several of Tamir's followers—particularly Tamir's beloved companion Ki, who would become her consort and the ancestor of all later Skalan royalty. The Retha'noi also pointed out the secret route through the mountains by whose use Tamir's army gained its victory, and the location where Tamir would build her new capital. Indeed, the name "Rhíminee" itself was derived from the Retha'noi language. Moreover, Lhel had been the lover and teacher of the Skalan wizard Arkoniel, and several spells later used by the Oreska—particularly translocation—were derived from Retha'noi magic. Being so beholden to them, it was Tamir's wish—not only to cease any harassment and persecution of the Retha'noi, but also to more closely integrate them in Skalan society. That, however, did not happen. In later generations, the Retha'noi withdrew even deeper into the mountains, and by Seregil and Alec's time, Skalans were hardly aware of their existence. A second cluster of Retha'noi communities were located in the mountains north of Mycena, where they formed an alliance with the Hâzadrielfaie—both groups having their own reasons to distrust and avoid outsiders. Though cut off from each other for centuries, Retha'noi from Mycena and Skala could easily interact when coming in contact with each other, speaking the same language and sharing the same magic and customs. There is no reference to any Retha'noi surviving in Plenimar. Plenimaran necromancers sometimes appropriated and abused Retha'noi sacred sites for their own dark rites, as described in Stalking Darkness. Along the Sklan seashore, former Retha'noi sacred sites were abandoned and not recognized for what they were.

=== The Dravinians ===
The Dravinians live in the mountains of north Aurënen. They are physically similar to the Retha'noi and can be mistaken for them, and they share the way of life of small, self-sustaining communities in mountain valleys—as well as the same unique sexual mores as the Retha'noi, whereby women are encouraged to mate with strangers and the children born of such unions are treasured and cherished. However, the Dravinian language is quite different to that of the Retha'noi, and the Dravinians have neither the Retha'noi magic nor their worship of The Mother. Rather, they have their own different and complicated religious system. Geographically, the configuration of the Dravinians vis-a-vis the Aurënfaie is similar to that of the Retha'noi vis-à-vis the Skalans—i.e., the Dravinians live in valleys among the mountains, while the Aurënfaie inhabit the lowlands. However, in the case of the Dravinians, there is no bitter history of conquest and dispossession. The rare Aurënfaie who wander into the mountains can count on a warm, friendly welcome in any Dravinian village. As Serengil noted, "Dravinian hospitality was legendary among those few who knew of it. Members of a neighboring village were greeted as family, which they often were. Anyone from beyond the limiting peaks was regarded as a veritable marvel. Seeing from afar such a rare visitor approaching would be enough for the villagers to start slaughtering goats, to have a feast ready for their guest". Nowhere is the history of the Dravinians and their relationship with the Retha'noi explained.

== Themes ==
=== LGBT ===
The series' two male protagonists fall in love during the course of the story. This is not the main plot, and their relationship is not established until the end of the second book, Stalking Darkness. There are hints of romantic potential throughout the first two books, but the fantasy adventure plots take up more of the readers' attention. In Lynn Flewelling's words: "I wanted to handle it the way I would with a straight character—an important part of who [Seregil] is and how he functions in society, but not the sum of who he is. I also created a culture where homosexuality is more accepted, if not universally so." Two of the stories in Glimpses include explicit homoerotic scenes.

=== Mythopoeia: Setting ===
Flewelling created a unique world in Luck in the Shadows, continued throughout the rest of the series, and expanded upon in her sister series The Tamír Triad. The main setting takes place in a country called Skala, which is part of the Three Lands: Skala, Mycena, and Plenimar. She gives the land a history deep with detail and realism, from war, trade and racism to natural corrosion. The politics are easy to understand, yet rich with intrigue and, if one knows where to look for them, falsities.

Flewelling's setting similar to medieval Europe, with farming and hunting as the primary occupations of the populace. Horses and ships are the only real modes of transportation, and the country is ruled by a Queen put there by her mother's bloodline and a prophecy from Afra: "So long as a daughter of Thelátimos' line defends and rules, Skala shall never be subjugated." Flewelling also added religious aspects as well as magical ones. She created a society known as the Third Oreska: wizards, and seamlessly integrated them into her setting.

At the time of the Tamir Triad, Skala has a clearly feudal society, with nobles living in castles and maintaining their own armed forces—those of the greater nobles nearly rivaling in power the Royal Army. Winning a civil war, like in The Oracle's Queen, depends on winning the support of enough nobles who bring their own feudal levies to support one of the contending parties. This situation has changed fundamentally by the time of the Nightrunner series 600 years later. While some things have not changed from Tamir's time (e.g. Skala's perennial enmity with Plenimar), the Skala where Alec and Seregil live is no longer feudal. The only army is the Royal Army, completely under the Queen's control. The nobility live mainly in urban villas or at the Royal court, drawing on the income of their estates for a life of luxury, but no longer have their own armed forces—a situation reminiscent of Western Europe in the 17th or 18th century.

=== Mythopoeia: Religion ===
Flewelling wrote a religion into her stories that goes deep into her characters' backgrounds, influencing the series as religion does in the real world. From language to prayer and magic, the religious aspects slide their way into every book. In Skala, most citizens believe in four notable deities, although depending on the part of the country, certain deities may receive special attention. There is Illior, the Lightbearer or Lightbringer. In Aurënen, he is called Aura. He is the god of the moon, wisdom and insanity, whose priests maintain oracles and to whom is attributed Skala's tradition of being ruled by Queens rather than Kings. There is Sakor, the Flamebringer, god of the Sun, war and victory; a devoted soldier is said to be "Sakor-touched". There is Dalna, the Maker, goddess of fertility, land and hearth; the Drysians, healers on whom Skalans depend for their medical services, are priests of Dalna, and when witnessing a horrifying scene, people are apt to exclaim "Maker's Mercy!" And there is Astellus, the Traveller, god of the sea and death, nicknamed "The Old Sailor". The gods can be male or female depending on region and perspective and share a dual nature; however, most often characters speaking of one of the gods use the word "he".

Officially "The Four" are referred to as co-equals and any Skalan community—from the capital Rhíminee down to the smallest village—has at its center a square flanked by their four temples. However, the reality is far less harmonious. Illior and Sakor are the main gods of Skala, and the Skalans' coat of arms is composed of Sakor's flame surmounted by Illior's sickle moon. The Tamir Triad relates a period where Illior and Sakor (or at least, their human devotees) were in conflict and the Sakorans actively persecuted the Illiorans; by the time of the Nightrunner series, this breach is long forgotten.

Still, Sakorans are sometimes heard to express preference for their "straightforward god" who can be counted on to reward bravery on the battlefield—as compared with the countless subtleties and ambiguities of Illior and his priesthood.

In Skala, the worship of Dalna is of lesser importance and there are few Dalnans to be found in Skala. Conversely, Dalna is the chief god of the northern Mycena, where Illior and Sakor are not much regarded. In Mycena, Illior is mainly seen as the patron god of thieves. Astellus seems to be the specific god of only a minority everywhere—mainly the patron god of sailors and fishers. The Heralds, who in time of war go between warring camps to deliver messages, are especially devoted to Astellus, and anyone harming a Herald risks this god's revenge.

In general there is no animal sacrifice. The only things burned on the various gods' altars are incense and, in the case of Illior, owl feathers—the owl being sacred to Illior. The only exception is the mid-winter Mourning Night, a central date in Skalan calendar, when the death of the old Sakor is mourned and on the following day the birth of the new Sakor is celebrated (similar to the historical Tammuz/Adonis religion). On that occasion a single black bull is sacrificed by the Queen in person, in a major ceremony involving all of Sakala's civic and religious dignitaries.

There are also minor deities, acknowledged throughout the country, but not worshiped at the same level as The Four. One of the more popular deities is Bilairy, said to guard the gate of the afterlife. While there is no mention of temples or priests of Bilairy, dying (especially in battle) is often referred to as "going to Bilairy's Gate". The most common expletives, frequently used by everybody from nobles down to beggars, are "Bilairy's Balls!", "Bilairy's Guts!", "Bilairy's Stinking Codpiece!" and the like. Both Astellus and Bilairy are associated with death; Astellus is said to ferry the souls of the departed up to Bilairy's Gate, which seems like an effort to harmonize gods derived from different pantheons. There is no mention of any detailed belief in afterlife, and no reference to what happens after a soul had crossed Bilairy's Gate.

The Retha'noi—indigenous inhabitants of Skala who were displaced and pushed into the mountains—worship a goddess known as "The Mother". They call her that both in their own language and in Skalan, and she does not seem to have any other name; the Retha'noi appear to have no other gods. The Mother is a fertility goddess and sex is part of her worship—in particular, making love in the open fields under the Full Moon, a practice that contributes to Skalan prejudice against the Retha'noi. Worship of The Mother is restricted to the Retha'noi; she is offended by any attempt of Skalans to call upon her, due to their harsh treatment of the Retha'noi. The Mother and Illior are both Moon deities, but are clearly not identical: The Mother is unquestionably female while Illior is usually depicted as male; Illior's emblem is the Crescent Moon while The Mother's most propitious time is the Full Moon; most significant, the wizards who are Illior's followers are barren, while the witches who follow The Mother are incredibly fertile, male witches remaining virile even at a hundred years old and each may sire hundreds of children in a lifetime (which the Retha'noi encourage).

Distinct and antithetical to other gods is Serimaius, worshiped in Plenimar. Serimaius is a harsh and cruel god who requires human sacrifice and encourages his followers to acts of cruelty and the perpetration of atrocities; such ruthless acts, for example by Plenimaran troops in wartime, might serve concrete political and strategic aims, but are pleasing to Serimaius in themselves. Necromancers are Serimaius' followers as wizards are those of Illior; the two gods and their respective followers are mortal enemies. Those who do not follow Serimaius consider the uttering of his name as unlucky and dangerous, and use various euphemisms instead: "The Empty God", "The Dark One", "The Evil One". Serimaius' followers sometimes call him "The Beautiful One"; when under the malign influence of a fragment of Serimaius' helmet, Seregil heard a deceptively beautiful singing that apparently came from Serimaius. Early books give the impression that Serimaius is the sole god of Plenimar, but with the closer glimpse of Plenimaran society in Shadows Return and The White Road it is shown that in fact worship of Serimaius is mainly concentrated at the Overlord's court where necromancers are active, and many other Plenimarans frown at it. Ordinary Plenimarans are mentioned as sometimes worshipping Sakor (which would be natural in a warlike nation), though probably not Illior.

== Books and other media ==
In September 2009, the independent film company C-Squared Productions optioned the rights to the first two books, Luck in the Shadows and Stalking Darkness, with the intention of adapting the text to film. Due to budget concerns, the project has since been called off.

#	Title	Pages	Audio	Release
1.	Luck in the Shadows	496	17h, 52m	August 1, 1996
2.	Stalking Darkness	512	19h, 15m	February 3, 1997
3.	Traitor's Moon	560	21h, 58m	July 6, 1999
4.	Shadows Return	544	12h, 2m	June 24, 2008
5.	The White Road	400	12h, 9m	May 25, 2010
6.	Casket of Souls	476	14h, 7m	May 29, 2012
	Glimpses	128	x	September 19, 2010
7.	Shards of Time	409	12h, 55m	April 1, 2014

== Concept and publication ==
Lynn Flewelling originally wrote Luck in the Shadows and Stalking Darkness as one book. The editor proposed splitting it in two due to the length and "so a series was born".

The series has been published by Bantam Spectra and Ballantine Books. Both companies are owned by Random House, Inc.
