= Tamír Triad =

Fantasy novel trilogy by Lynn Flewelling

The Tamír Triad
- Books: The Bone Doll's Twin; Hidden Warrior; The Oracle's Queen
- Author: Lynn Flewelling
- Country: United States
- Language: English
- Genre: Fantasy, Adventure
- Publisher: Bantam Spectra
- Published: October, 2001 – June, 2006
- Media type: Print (Paperback)
- Preceded by: The Nightrunner Series

The Tamír Triad is a fantasy trilogy by American writer Lynn Flewelling. It contains three novels--The Bone Doll's Twin (2001), Hidden Warrior (2003), and Oracle's Queen (2006)--and has a sister series, The Nightrunner Series, which contains seven. The series contains mythopoeia. The resounding issue dealt with within the series is the on-and-off war between two fictional countries, Skala and Plenimar, and their citizens, with other countries and people often becoming caught in the crossfire.

The series focuses on Queen Tamír II, known throughout her childhood as Prince Tobin, and how she goes from being a sad, haunted child to a Warrior Queen. Dark magic was used to disguise her in childhood from her uncle, who would have all the women in his line killed in case they tried to take his throne, but the Oracle predicts that Tamír will be Queen, and many people go to unbelievable lengths to make sure that it happens.

It has been translated into multiple languages and published in multiple countries, including Russia. Bantam Spectra is the publishing company of all three, as well as the sister series, The Nightrunner Series.

== Synopsis ==
In the fictional kingdom of Skala, an ancient prophecy states that the realm will prosper only when ruled by a daughter of the royal line. The King Erius seizes the throne from his younger sister Ariani, Skala falls into political instability, famine, plague, and war. Fearing a rival claimant, Erius orders the deaths of all female heirs connected to the royal bloodline.

When Ariani becomes pregnant, the wizards lya and Arkoniel discover through prophecy that her child is destined to restore the rightful line and rule as queen. To protect the infant from the king, the wizards conceal the children's identity using magic. Following the birth of twins, the male child dies, and the surviving daughter is magically disguised as a boy named Tobin. The court is told that the girl died at birth.

Raised as a prince, Tobin grows up unaware of his true identity or lineage. His isolated childhood is shaped by political secrecy, his mother's deteriorating mental state, and the haunting presence of his dead twin brother's spirit. As he grows older, Tobin forms a close bond with a boy named Ki and is eventually brought to the royal court to serve among the companions of Prince Korin. While training as a noble and future knight, Tobin becomes increasingly entangled in court politics, prophecy, and magical forces surrounding the throne of Skala. Over time, he begins to confront questions surrounding his identity and destiny, ultimately facing the possibility of challenging the existing royal order to fulfill the prophecy tied to the kingdom's survival.

== Characters ==
Tamír í Ariani Gherilain, also known as Queen Tamír II, and previously known as Prince Tobin, was introduced in the first book, The Bone Doll's Twin. She is the main character in every book of the trilogy.

The main character of the 'Tamír Triad', Queen Tamír II was introduced as Prince Tobin. She was disguised as a boy so as to easily hide from her uncle, who would have her killed as a threat to his place on the throne, which was rightfully her mother's. Eventually she must reveal herself as female, and fight her cousin in civil war, in order to take her place on the throne and repair the country her uncle had tarnished in his rejection of the Oracle's declaration that there must be a Queen of Skala. She is mentioned in the Nightrunner Series as one of the greatest Skalan Queens, being responsible for the Great Canal, the new capital of Rhiminee', and the Third Oreska.

== Countries and cultures ==
One defining feature of Skala is that the throne is always held by a Queen, power traveling matrilineally. The queen takes an active role in the defense of Skala, riding out and taking part in battles, and holds the military title of "War Commander." She is also in charge of helping her people in times of peace, by acting as the judge for public disputes, as well as controlling taxes, food availability, plague and more. This is due to the prophecy made at the Afran Oracle in Skala, which states:

So long as a daughter of Thelátimos’ line defends and rules, Skala shall never be subjugated.

This prophecy was made during The Great War with Plenimar, and King Thelatimos instantly handed the crown to his daughter Gherilain, who quickly led the country to victory. Other than the Queen, there are many important roles within the Skalan government, such as Commanders, Generals, Secretaries, Treasurers, etc. Many nobles own their own land and armies, though swear fealty to the Queen and give her their forces in times of war.

Following Queen Gherilain the First, there have been many Queens, and occasionally Kings. Those known are Tamír, who was poisoned by her own brother, Pelis, who became King until plague struck him down and his niece, Agnalain, became Queen. Then Gherilain II; followed by Iaair, who was known to have fought a dragon; Klia, who killed a lion; Klie; Markira; Oslie, who had six fingers; and Marnil, who began the tradition of having more than one consort. Having a King is not completely ruled out, but it is still very much the exception - a Queen is considered the obviously preferable option (the opposite of how things were in historical feudal monarchies); having a King instead of a Queen involves the risk of pestilence, drought and/or foreign invasion - all attributed to the Illior's curse. In the generation preceding that of Tamír II, Queen Agnalain III was the first mad Queen and Erius, her son, became King because his sister was still just a child at the time of their mother's death - but Tamír II, his niece, became Queen instead of his son when he died.

== Moral issues ==
At the center of the Tamír Triad is the moral issue of whether the end justifies the means. This is presented at the beginning. In order to save the future of Skala, the True Queen, Tamír, must survive the murderous schemes of her usurper uncle and live to grow to maturity. But in order to provide the magical disguise which alone could preserve her life, the well-meaning protagonists must perpetrate a terrible act - to kill an innocent baby, the future Queen's twin brother, at the moment of his drawing his first breath. Throughout the three volumes, all those involved in this act not only suffer pangs of conscience but are also quite literally haunted by the vengeful ghost of the murdered baby.

In later stages of the plot, there are further cases where it is considered that the end justifies the means, and that anyone discovering the secret must be killed though they are completely innocent. There is a clear difference between the wizard Arkoniel - who tends to be more compassionate - and his teacher and mentor Iya, who while a positive character is more ready to make ruthless decisions. Arkoniel's approach is vindicated when he refrains from killing Ki, Korin/Tamír's beloved friend, though Ki was on the point of discovering the secret. As later seen, the living Ki plays a major role in helping Tamír realize her destiny.

== Transgender issues ==
Transgender issues have a central role in the Tamír Triad as they virtually never were in earlier generations of fantasy writing. To begin with, Prince Tobin is to all appearances male - both in his own perception and in that of others. Boys who swim naked with Tobin have no reason to doubt his male anatomy. Yet, due to the magical reasons which are an important part of the plot, in the underlying, essential identity Tobin had always been a disguised girl. In the cataclysmic scene of magical change this becomes an evident physical fact, and Prince Tobin becomes Queen Tamír, shedding the male body and gaining a fully functioning female one. Yet it takes Tamír considerable time and effort to come to terms with her female sexuality. She feels especially queasy at the prospect of eventually becoming pregnant - as she must, since producing an heir is an important part of a Queen's duty. There is also the problematic relationship with Ki, who had been the close boy companion of Prince Tobin and whose transformation into the Queen's lover or Consort is far from smooth or easy.
