= Traitor's Moon =

Book by Lynn Flewelling

- First edition
- Author: Lynn Flewelling
- Cover artist: Gary Ruddell
- Language: English
- Series: Nightrunner
- Genre: Fantasy
- Publisher: Spectra
- Publication date: July 6, 1999
- Publication place: United States
- Media type: Print (Paperback)
- Pages: 560
- ISBN: 0-553-57725-5
- OCLC: 41829526
- Preceded by: Stalking Darkness
- Followed by: Shadows Return

Traitor's Moon is a fantasy novel by American writer Lynn Flewelling, the third book in Nightrunner series. It was published in the Bantam Spectre division of Penguin Random House. It is preceded by Luck in the Shadows and Stalking Darkness and followed by Shadows Return and The White Road.

The book continues from events in the previous book in the series. Events continue from the point of view of the monarchy of Skala. For aid in its war with Plenimar, the ruling Skalan Queen's youngest daughter is sent on a mission to Aurënen. She is accompanied by an escort of troops and courtiers that include several of the characters from the previous novels in the series. This includes an exile Aurënen nobleman.

The book focuses on describing the land of Aurënen, which is not open to outsiders, and where magic is common. Its climax shows how the exiled noble is reconciled with his family and situation, and how the mission results in aid for Skala.

After publication, reviews mentioned the well-realised description of the world together with the pace and invention in the story as reasons for readers to enjoy the book.
