= Shadows Return =

2008 book by Lynn Flewelling

- First edition
- Author: Lynn Flewelling
- Cover artist: Michael Komarck
- Language: English
- Series: Nightrunner
- Genre: Fantasy
- Publisher: Bantam Spectra
- Publication date: July 2008
- Publication place: United States
- Media type: Print (Paperback)
- Pages: 522
- ISBN: 978-0-553-59008-1
- Preceded by: Traitor's Moon
- Followed by: The White Road

Shadows Return is a fantasy novel by American writer Lynn Flewelling, the fourth novel in her Nightrunner series. It is preceded by Luck in the Shadows, Stalking Darkness and Traitor's Moon, and is followed by The White Road.

== Plot ==
After their victory in Aurënen, Alec and Seregil have returned home to Rhíminee. But with most of their allies dead or away, it is difficult for them to settle in. Hoping for diversion, they accept an assignment from queen Phoria to go to Seregil's homeland and call Klia to Skala. En route, however, they are ambushed and separated, and both are sold into slavery to the Plenimarans.

There they are bought by the alchemist Yhakobin who hopes to use Alec's Hâzadrielfaie blood to create a rhekaro, a sexless creature that can heal everything and prolong life. The first doesn't meet his expectations and he has it butchered. Alec takes pity on the rhekaro and hates Yhakobin for torturing and killing it, and is determined to save the second one from a similar fate. Increasingly, Alec feels paternal towards rhekaro, who has Alec's own face - reminding himself of the Dragon Oracle's prophecy that he would "beget a child of no woman". Eventually, Seregil and Alec escape, the first with the help of a servant woman and the second by picking his lock. Knowing that the rhekaro will die without his blood, Alec is determined to save him and takes him along, while Seregil brings his betrayer, Ilar í Sontir, to show them a secret tunnel.

The atmosphere is initially tense when Alec finds Ilar's identity and Seregil, too, has doubts about the uncommon-looking child, but they fare well for several days, with Alec's hunting skills and the food they had stolen. Later, the rhekaro, whom Alec names Sebrahn, shows extraordinary healing powers, which they use to get rid of their slave brands so that they are not found out by other slavers.

Near the port they are found by their former master. Ilar flees in panic, but Alec and Seregil stand firm. The archers target Seregil but Alec jumps in front of him and is killed. Anguished, Seregil kills Yhakobin before Sebrahn starts singing and kills the soldiers. His tears then fall on Alec's wound and create the white blossoms that the alchemist had been trying to create and brings him back to life.

During this time Alec's shade quickly finds Thero and directs him and Micum to Seregil. Thero helps them they continue their journey, but they are soon found by a necromancer, presumably sent to retrieve the rekharo. When Thero can't stop him, Sebrahn sings again and kills him. Together they get aboard and head for Aurënen. On their landing, Magyana lays eyes upon the child and says she sees the a dragon in his aura.

The plot gives some explanation as to why the Hâzadrielfaie left their homeland long ago and went into the far north, and why they keep to themselves, kill any outsider venturing into their land and especially forbid any sexual relationship with outsiders and kill anyone involved in such as a relationship - as they killed Alec's mother and tried to kill Alec himself and his father. That is all because they very strongly object to their blood being used in order to create a rhekaro. At the very end of the book, the Hâzadrielfaie are for the first time seen onstage - discovering that despite all their efforts a rhekaro was created and resolving to loose their hunters.

== Reception ==
The book was also nominated for Best Fantasy novel in 2008 by Romantic Times.
