= Oracle's Queen =

2006 book by Lynn Flewelling

The Oracle's Queen
- First edition cover
- Author: Lynn Flewelling
- Cover artist: David Wyatt
- Language: English
- Series: Tamír Triad
- Genre: Fantasy
- Publisher: Voyager Books
- Publication date: 2 May 2006
- Publication place: United States
- Media type: Print (Hardback & Paperback)
- Pages: 400 (first edition, paperback)
- ISBN: 0-00-711312-9 (first edition, paperback)
- OCLC: 65202822
- Preceded by: Hidden Warrior

Oracle's Queen is a fantasy novel by American writer Lynn Flewelling, the last book in her The Tamír Triad. It was published in 2006. It is preceded by Hidden Warrior and by The Bone Doll's Twin.

== Plot introduction ==
Having been revealed as a girl in Hidden Warrior, Tamír (previously Tobin), tries to rule her kingdom with the wizard Arkoniel at her side, and trying to hide the love she feels for Ki. But what she doesn't understand is why Brother, her dead demon brother, has come back with more power than before, stronger as she draws closer to a battle with Korin...

== Plot summary ==
More and more people flock to Tamír's cause as they find out that she is Skala's promised Queen and that only by putting her on the throne will everything be put aright once more.

Tamír is much loved by the people and very popular, but she faces problems of her own. Ki, whom she loves, does not feel physical love in return, while Brother is back with more power than ever, introducing himself with only this line: "The dead do not rest until they have had vengeance." With every day that the two opposing could-be-future monarchs of Skala (Korin and Tamír), the soldiers become more and more restless, itching for a fight.

However, Tamír doesn't want to fight her beloved cousin and tries to delay the battle as much as she can. She also does not relish the prospect of a civil war in which the people of Skala will fight and kill each other - so soon after Skala's hereditary enemies from Plenimar had landed a devastating blow.
