= Glimpses: A Collection of Nightrunner Short Stories =

2010 book by Lynn Flewelling

- Author: Lynn Flewelling
- Cover artist: Anne Cain
- Language: English
- Series: The Nightrunner Series
- Genre: Fantasy novel
- Publisher: Three Crow Press
- Publication date: September 19, 2010
- Publication place: United States
- Media type: Print (Paperback)
- Pages: 128
- ISBN: 1-453-62491-0

Glimpses: A Collection of Nightrunner Short Stories is a short story collection for Lynn Flewelling's Nightrunner series. Set in a fantasy world, the collection follows the adventures of a complex 'faie thief and his apprentice. It fills gaps in the main story. Glimpses: A Collection of Nightrunner Short Stories was released on September 19, 2010.

== Plot ==
Glimpses explores "lost" moments from Flewelling's popular Nightrunner series, events alluded to or passed over - Alec's parents and childhood, Seregil's early liaisons in Skala, Seregil and Alec's first night as lovers, and how Seregil and Micum met. Each story offers a new perspective on events readers have speculated about for years.

== Stories ==
- "Misfit"
- "The Wild"
- "By the River"
- "The Bond"
- "The Summer Players" (an excerpt from The Summer Players, the working title of what became Casket of Souls)

== Characters ==
- Seregil
- Alec
- Micum
- Nysander
- Thero
