= Hidden Warrior =

2003 novel by Lynn Flewelling

The Hidden Warrior
- First edition cover
- Author: Lynn Flewelling
- Cover artist: David Wyatt
- Language: English
- Series: Tamír Triad
- Genre: Fantasy
- Publisher: Voyager Books
- Publication date: 2003
- Publication place: United Kingdom
- Media type: Print (hardback & paperback)
- Pages: 551
- ISBN: 0-00-711310-2
- OCLC: 52145804
- Preceded by: The Bone Doll's Twin
- Followed by: Oracle's Queen

Hidden Warrior is a fantasy novel by American writer Lynn Flewelling, the second book in the Tamír Triad. It is followed by Oracle's Queen.

== Plot summary ==
Following the events in The Bone Doll's Twin, Prince Tobin awakens after the witch Lhel reveals that he was born as a girl, but in view of the king's purge of all possible female heirs that threaten him, Tobin was disguised by magic, wearing the shape of his stillborn brother, whose bones are encased in the little doll his mother carried everywhere with her. Tobin's squire Ki (Kirothius) was gravely injured in coming to find Tobin. They recover for a time under the care of the wizard Iya. Tobin is haunted by the ghost of his brother, who coldly watches over him.

Once Ki recovered, they return to the capital city beset by plague, as was prophesied, if the matriarchal throne is usurped. All female warriors and females holding important roles, were ordered to leave, leaving the city completely under male rule. A prominent court wizard, Niryn, directs and leads the city, driving out all other wizards, claiming they are the cause of the city's difficulties. He commands the Harriers, a force dedicated to eradicating opposing wizards. Despite the Harriers, who are busily killing and exterminating all wizards, the old magics are not only being preserved, but the mages are making discoveries that they are determined to use to come back, and put the rightful Queen back on the throne of Skala. Niryn, however, has provided himself with insurance. After finding a distant relative to the Royal Family with a female baby, he promptly murdered and her husband - to raise himself the child, Nalia, with the intention of ultimately making her a Queen completely dependent on himself.

Tobin, meanwhile, has rejoined the Companions, a small group of noble and high born boys, around Tobin's cousin Prince Korin, the heir to the throne. Tobin becomes interested in battle strategies and war, and outdoes himself in regards to fencing, though he also has the artist's touch. As he and the rest of the Companions pass from children to teens and young men, Tobin encounters more and more difficulty in coming to terms with who he really is. He must carefully hide his identity from the other Companions, and even from his close friend and companion Ki. Moreover, though having an outwardly male body and genitals, Tobin begins to experience menstrual pains, and unlike the wild boys around him, feels no interest in sex with girls (some of whom are quite attracted to him).

Meanwhile, the increasingly uninhibited Prince Korin impregnates several serving girls, who are quietly disposed of by the wizard Niryn. However, when Lady Aliya is pregnant with prince Korin's child, Niryn is unable to prevent a wedding, instead causing Aliya to miscarry and bring forth a monstrous fetus with neither arms nor face.

The wizards are gathering, plotting against the reign of King Erius, who possesses the Sword of Gherilain, a symbol of the ruler of Skala, which no King or Queen can rule without.

Tobin begins to attract attention form the other boys, with his refusals to join them in the brothels and his stunted growth. However, he proves himself in battle against brigands, rallying the Companions to him, while Prince Korin freezes in the heat of battle. Pregnant again, Aliya gives birth to a dead, hideously deformed child without face or legs, Niryn's work (which he quickly blames on the renegade wizards). Lady Aliya then dies in the birth, along with the child, destroying Prince Korin's royal line.

Soon afterwards, there is a deadly surprise attack from Plenimar, Skala's hereditary enemy. Having first used biological warfare, leaving mute children infected with pox along the Skalan coastline, thousands of Plenimaran troops land by night. Aided by sinister Necromancers, they capture Skala's capital Ero which was weakened by rampant plague, and proceed to indiscriminately torture, enslave and massacre its population and burn down the entire city, making of it a wasteland.

The desperate and severely wounded King Erius, besieged with the few remaining soldiers at the palace compound, sends Prince Tobin to rally troops from the city of Atyion to the north, the hereditary fief of Tobin's father. A treacherous noble who had seized control of Atyion tries to bar him, but Tobin rallies the people who rebel and hang the traitor. Thereupon comes the moment for Tobin to enact the magic which would restore his/her true shape as a girl and the long-awaited Rightful Queen of Skala. Tobin makes the perilous magical transformation, involving a deep cut into his chest which brings about a magical explosion, while standing stark naked in front of the gathered people of Atyion - so that there would be no trace of doubt about the veracity of the sex change. Having become an unquestioned woman, Tobin must take a woman's name - choosing the name of Tamír, an ancient Queen who was murdered by here brother and whose ghost had encouraged Tobin.

Gathering the troops of Atyion and of various other fiefs, Tobin/Tamir heads back to Ero. Meanwhile, the freed Brother appears at the palace, stopping the heart of the King, and leaving Korin to be King in his stead. Though outnumbered, Tamír's army engages in furious fighting with the Plenimaran invaders, Tamír leading the troops and proving herself a true Warrior Queen, and aided by the wizards. Most of the Plenimarans are killed - only a few managing to flee back to their homeland. Tamír formally proclaims herself to the gathered wizards, priests and common people, who rejoice that the true Queen has returned - though the capital was totally devastated and very many died.

However, in final stages of the Plenimaran siege, Niryn had spread lies to the prince and turned him against his formerly beloved cousin. Shortly before Tamír's victorious arrival at devastated palace, Niryn made Korin flee with him to the strategic fortress of Cirna, which Niryn took over by treacherously massacring its garrison. Nalia already is there, and the frightened girl is told that Korin is her new husband - Niryn planning to have her impregnated with a rival heir for the Skalan throne.

Although Tamír is Queen, exercising real power, she cannot be formally crowned without the Sword of Gherilain, which is the Badge of Office of a Skalan Monarch (as well as being a formidable weapon, still sharp after centuries, and effectively used by Queens and Kings in battle). Tamír needs to retrieve this sword from Korin. At the same time, she is extremely reluctant to fight Korin, who had always been on good terms with his cousin. She also hopes to spare Skala, already devastated by plague and a cruel foreign invasion, the additional agony of civil war. However, being Queen often involves hard choices and the need to take actions which one finds repugnant - as would be told in the sequel, Oracle's Queen.

== Characters in "Hidden Warrior" ==
- Squire Kirotheius
- Tobin
- Prince Korin
