= The Bone Doll's Twin =

2001 novel by Lynn Flewelling

- First edition cover
- Author: Lynn Flewelling
- Cover artist: George Underwood
- Language: English
- Series: Tamír Triad
- Genre: Fantasy
- Publisher: Voyager Books
- Publication date: 16 July 2001
- Publication place: United States
- Media type: Print (hardback & paperback)
- Pages: 448 (first edition, hardback)
- ISBN: 0-00-711307-2 (first edition, hardback)
- OCLC: 59549619
- Followed by: Hidden Warrior

The Bone Doll's Twin is a fantasy novel by American writer Lynn Flewelling, the first in her Tamir Triad. It is followed by Hidden Warrior and then by Oracle's Queen.

== Plot ==
Set in the troubled kingdom of Skala, once protected by a divine prophecy and a line of warrior queens, the story follows the rise of the usurper king Erius, whose rule brings plague, drought, and war with Plenimar. Determined to secure a male heir, he ensures that any female born to the royal line is killed, even as whispers persist that only a true queen can restore balance.

When his sister secretly bears a daughter, a small group of allies, including the wizard Iya Ta'Sia use forbidden magic to disguise the child as a boy, Tobin, binding her sacrificed twin brother’s spirit to a bone doll to conceal her identity. Raised as the king’s nephew, Tobin grows up isolated and haunted, while those who know the truth struggle to protect her from the king’s wrath, her mother’s instability, and the vengeful spirit bound to her fate, as the kingdom’s survival increasingly depends on her reclaiming her rightful destiny.

== Reception ==
The book was generally acclaimed by readers and other authors. George R. R. Martin wrote "The Bone Doll’s Twin is a thoroughly engrossing new fantasy. It got its hooks into me on the first page, and didn’t let loose until the last. I am already looking forward to the next installment.", while according to Robin Hobb the novel is "A relentless tale that examines whether the ends can ever completely justify the means."
