= Bantam Spectra =

Science fiction division of Bantam Books

- Parent company: Bantam Books/Random House
- Founded: 1945
- Founder: Walter B. Pitkin, Jr.; Sidney B. Kramer; and Ian and Betty Ballantine
- Country of origin: United States
- Headquarters location: New York City, New York
- Publication types: Books
- Fiction genres: Science fiction, Fantasy
- Official website: www.unboundworlds.com

Bantam Spectra is the science fiction division of American publishing company Bantam Books, which is owned by Random House.

According to their website, Spectra publishes "science fiction, fantasy, horror, and speculative novels from recognizable authors". Spectra authors have collectively won 31 such awards in the fields of science fiction and fantasy, and been nominated on 132 occasions. These authors include the following:

- Anthony Ballantyne
- Bruce Sterling
- Catherine Asaro
- Catherynne Valente
- Charles Platt
- Christopher Barzak
- Connie Willis
- Dan Simmons
- David Brin
- David J Williams
- Doug Beason
- Elisabeth Vonarburg
- Elizabeth Bear
- Elizabeth Hand
- Ellen Kushner
- George R. R. Martin
- Gregory Benford
- Ian McDonald
- Jamil Nasir
- Joe Lansdale
- John Ford
- Justina Robson
- Karen Joy Fowler
- Kelley Armstrong
- Kevin J. Anderson
- Kim Stanley Robinson
- Lisa Goldstein
- Liz Williams
- M. K. Hobson
- Maggie Furey
- Margaret Ogden
- Margaret Weis
- Mark Budz
- Michael McQuay
- Neal Stephenson
- Patrice Murphy
- Patricia Geary
- Paula Volsky
- Richard Grant
- Robert Charles Wilson
- Roberta MacAvoy
- Roger MacBride Allen
- Scott Lynch
- Sheri Tepper
- T. A. Pratt
- Tim Lebbon
- Tracy Hickman
- William Gibson
- William McCarthy

== Bantam Spectra series ==
=== Star Wars ===
More than 20 Star Wars novels have been published under the Bantam Spectra Imprint. Notable Spectra Star Wars novels include Timothy Zahn's blockbuster Thrawn Trilogy, Barbara Hambly's Children of the Jedi, and others. Eventually Lucasfilm, which owns Star Wars, decided to have Scholastic and Del Rey publish their books, leading to the end of the Bantam Spectra Star Wars era.
