= Cultural depictions of Richard II of England =

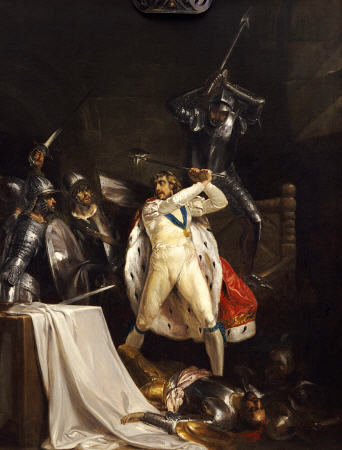
Fanciful depiction of the death of Richard II.

Richard II of England has been depicted in popular culture a number of times.

== Literature ==
- Richard is the central character in Richard II, a play by William Shakespeare dating from around 1595.
- Richard is also the main antagonist in an anonymous, incomplete play, often known as Thomas of Woodstock (play) or Richard II, Part 1, whose composition is dated between 1591 and 1595.
- He is the protagonist of the play Richard of Bordeaux by Gordon Daviot.
- Richard appears in the novel The New June by Henry Newbolt, along with Henry IV and William Langland.
- He is a character in the novel The Named by Marianne Curley.
- He is one of the main characters in The Crucible Trilogy by Sara Douglass.
- He is one of the main characters in The Gentle Falcon by Hilda Lewis.
- He is an important character in Das Lächeln der Fortuna by the German historical novel writer Rebecca Gablé.
- Richard is a main character in Within The Hollow Crown by Margaret Campbell Barnes.
- Richard appears with his wife Anne of Bohemia and their friend Robert de Vere in Anthony Minghella's play Two Planks and a Passion.

== Television ==
Richard has been portrayed a number of times on television, mainly in versions of Shakespeare's play. In this context he has been played by:

- Alan Wheatley in a BBC version, The Tragedy of King Richard II (1950)
- Maurice Evans in an American version, Richard II (1954)
- David William in the BBC series An Age of Kings (1960), which contained all the history plays from Richard II to Richard III
- Ric Hutton in an Australian TV version of Richard II (1960)
- Hannes Messemer in a West German version, König Richard II (1968)
- Ian McKellen in another BBC version, The Tragedy of King Richard II (1970)
- Tamás Jordán in a Hungarian version, II. Richárd (1976)
- Derek Jacobi in the BBC Shakespeare version, King Richard the Second (1978)
- Michael Pennington in the BBC series The Wars of the Roses (1989), which included all of Shakespeare's history plays performed by the English Shakespeare Company
- Aleksandr Romantsov in a Russian version, Richard Vtoroi (1992)
- Fiona Shaw in a British TV film, Richard II (1997)
- Michael Maertens in another German version, Richard II (2001)
- Mark Rylance in another BBC film, Richard II (2003), broadcast live from the Globe Theatre in London
- Ben Whishaw in Richard II (2012) as part of the BBC's The Hollow Crown, a series of four of Shakespeare's history plays, which also includes Henry IV, Part 1, Henry IV Part 2 and Henry V.

Richard has also been played on television by:

- Andrew Osborn in a BBC adaptation of Richard of Bordeaux (1938)
- Peter Cushing in another BBC adaptation of Richard of Bordeaux (1955)
- Roger Allam in a BBC film, Henry IV (1995), a version of Shakespeare's Henry IV, Part 1

== Film ==
Richard has been played on film by:

- Woody Norman in The Uprising (2026)

== Video ==
- Richard was played by Mattie Osian in a straight-to-video film adaptation of Shakespeare's Richard the Second (2001).
- David Birney played him in an American video Richard II (1982), which was intended to simulate an Elizabethan stage production of the play.
