= Cultural depictions of Henry IV of England =

Henry IV of England has been depicted in popular culture a number of times.

== Literature ==
- Almost two hundred years after his death, Henry became the subject of two plays by William Shakespeare, Henry IV, Part 1 and Henry IV, Part 2, as well as featuring prominently in Richard II.
- As the Earl of Derby, Henry is a character in Gordon Daviot's 1932 play Richard of Bordeaux.
- Henry appears in a historical novel by Henry Newbolt, The New June (1909).
- Ellis Peters's novel A Bloody Field by Shrewsbury (1972, US title The Bloody Field) revolves around the relationship between Henry, Prince Hal and Hotspur.
- Also in 1972, Martha Rofheart wrote a novel featuring Henry IV, Fortune Made His Sword (UK title Cry God For Harry).
- Henry is a supporting character in Georgette Heyer's 1975 historical novel My Lord John, which details the early life of his son, John of Lancaster.
- Anya Seton included Henry in her 1954 novel Katherine which depicted the relationship between Henry's father John of Gaunt and his eventual step-mother Katherine Swynford.
- Henry is a main character in Sara Douglass's The Crucible Trilogy, a work of historical fiction.
- Henry is the king in Howard Pyle's fictional Men of Iron. The protagonist's father's loyalty to Richard II is the reason that the family is in hiding for most of the book.

== Film ==
Henry has been portrayed on screen by:

- Ian Keith in The Black Shield of Falworth (1954), with Tony Curtis
- John Gielgud in Chimes at Midnight (1965), a merger of several Shakespeare plays
- Carl Wharton in Henry IV - Part 2 (2012), a film by The Co-operative British Youth Film Academy.
- Ben Mendelsohn in The King (2019), a film by Netflix

== Television ==
Henry has been portrayed a number of times on television, mainly in versions of Shakespeare's plays. In this context he has been played by:

- Clement McCallin in a BBC version of The Tragedy of King Richard II (1950)
- Kent Smith in an American version of Richard II (1954)
- Tom Fleming in the BBC series An Age of Kings (1960), which contained all the history plays from Richard II to Richard III
- Erik Hell in Henrik IV (1964), a Swedish version of Henry IV
- Hartmut Reck in König Richard II (1968), a West German version of Richard II
- Timothy West in another BBC version of The Tragedy of King Richard II (1970)
- Sándor Lukács in II. Richárd (1976), a Hungarian version of Richard II
- Jon Finch in the BBC Shakespeare version of King Richard the Second (1978) and both parts of Henry IV (1979)
- Michael Cronin in the BBC series The Wars of the Roses (1989), which included all of Shakespeare's history plays performed by the English Shakespeare Company
- Nikolai Lavrov in Richard Vtoroi (1992), a Russian version of Richard II
- Ronald Pickup in a BBC film, Henry IV (1995), a version of Henry IV, Part 1
- Richard Bremmer in a British TV film, Richard II (1997)
- Veit Schubert in another German version of Richard II (2001)
- Liam Brennan in another BBC film, Richard II (2003), broadcast live from the Globe Theatre in London
- Jeremy Irons in the TV miniseries The Hollow Crown (in the 'Henry IV' episodes) (2012)
- Rory Kinnear also played the younger Henry IV (Bolingbroke) in The Hollow Crown (in the 'Richard II' episode) (2012)

Henry has also been played on television by:

- Ralph Truman in a BBC adaptation of Richard of Bordeaux (1938)
- John Arnatt in another BBC adaptation of Richard of Bordeaux (1955)

== Video ==
- Henry was played by Barry Smith in a straight-to-video film adaptation of Shakespeare's Richard the Second (2001).
- Paul Shenar played him in an American video Richard II (1982), in an Elizabethan style stage production of the play.

== Naming ==
Henry IV of England has also influenced an increased precedence in the use of "Henry" as a first name. In fact, it was so popular as to top the Telegraph's list of most popular baby names in 2014. Examples of the name in use include Prince Harry, whose given name is Henry, and Henry Fippinger.
