= Enchanter (novel) =

1996 fantasy novel by Sara Douglass

- Enchanter first edition cover.
- Author: Sara Douglass
- Cover artist: Rob Kiely
- Language: English
- Series: The Axis Trilogy
- Genre: Fantasy
- Publisher: Voyager
- Publication date: 28 February 1996
- Publication place: Australia
- Media type: Print (Paperback)
- Pages: 672 (first edition)
- ISBN: 978-0-7322-5129-1
- Preceded by: Battleaxe
- Followed by: StarMan

Enchanter is a 1996 fantasy novel by Australian writer Sara Douglass. It follows the first book in the series, Battleaxe, with Axis journeying to the Icarii stronghold to receive his heritage.

== Background ==
Enchanter was first published in Australia in 1996 by HarperCollins in paperback format. It was later released in the United States in hardback and paperback in 2001 and 2002 respectively. Enchanter won the 1996 Aurealis Award for best fantasy novel in a three-way tie with Douglass' other novel StarMan and Jack Dann's The Memory Cathedral.
