= StarMan =

1996 novel by Sara Douglass

- StarMan first edition cover
- Author: Sara Douglass
- Cover artist: Shaun Tan
- Language: English
- Series: The Axis Trilogy
- Genre: Fantasy
- Publisher: Voyager
- Publication date: 30 October 1996
- Publication place: Australia
- Media type: Print (hardback & paperback)
- Pages: 704 (first edition)
- ISBN: 978-0-7322-5159-8
- Preceded by: Enchanter

StarMan is a 1996 fantasy novel by Australian writer Sara Douglass. It follows the second book in the series, Enchanter, with Axis marching north with his army to confront a formidable enemy.

== Background ==
StarMan was first published in Australia on 30 October 1999 by Voyager in paperback format. It was later released in the United States and the United Kingdom in both hardback and paperback formats. StarMan won the 1996 Aurealis Award for best fantasy novel in a three-way tie with Douglass' other novel Enchanter and Jack Dann's The Memory Cathedral.
