= Troy Game =

Troy Game may refer to:

- Troy Game, a modern dance work by Robert North (choreographer)
- The Troy Game, a book series by Australian author Sara Douglass
