= George Villiers, 1st Duke of Buckingham =

English courtier and statesman (1592–1628)

His Grace The Duke of Buckingham KG
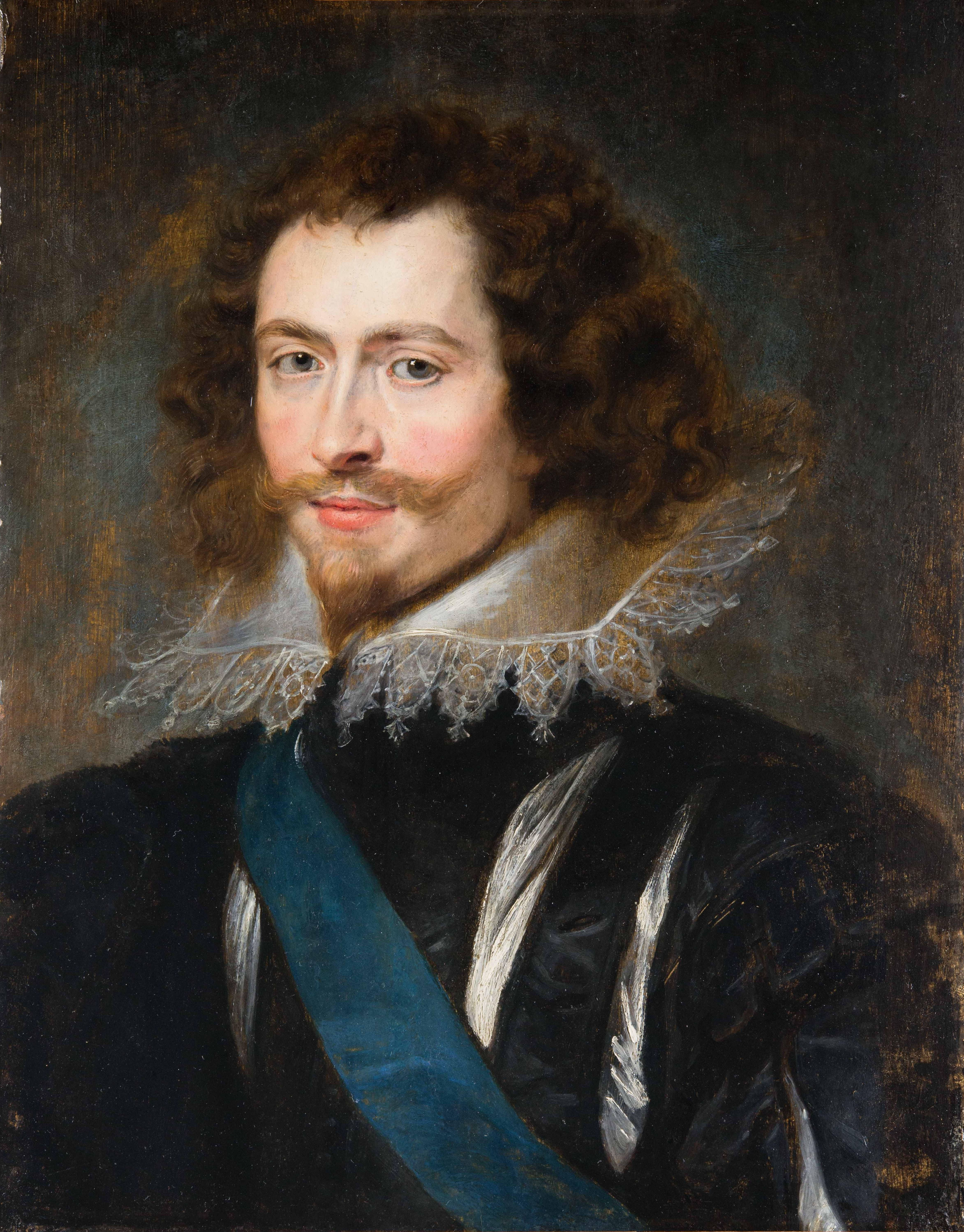
- Portrait by Peter Paul Rubens, 1625

Master of the Horse
- In office 4 January 1616 – 23 August 1628
- Monarchs: James VI and I Charles I
- Preceded by: The Earl of Worcester
- Succeeded by: The Earl of Holland

Lord High Admiral
- In office 28 January 1619 – 23 August 1628
- Preceded by: The Earl of Nottingham
- Succeeded by: Board of Admiralty

Lord Lieutenant of Buckinghamshire
- In office 16 September 1616 – 23 August 1628
- Preceded by: Sir Francis Fortescue
- Succeeded by: The Earl of Bridgewater

Lord Lieutenant of Middlesex
- In office 6 May 1622 – 23 August 1628
- Preceded by: In commission
- Succeeded by: The Earl of Dorset; The Earl of Holland

Lord Lieutenant of Kent
- In office 31 May 1620 – 8 June 1620
- Preceded by: The Lord Wotton
- Succeeded by: The Duke of Lennox

Personal details
- Born: 20 August 1592 Brooksby, Leicestershire, England
- Died: 23 August 1628 (aged 36) Portsmouth, Hampshire, England
- Cause of death: Assassination
- Resting place: Westminster Abbey
- Spouse: Katherine Manners, Baroness de Ros
- Children: Mary Stewart, Duchess of Richmond; Charles Villiers, Earl of Coventry; George Villiers, 2nd Duke of Buckingham; Francis Villiers
- Parents: George Villiers; Mary Beaumont
- Relatives: Villiers family
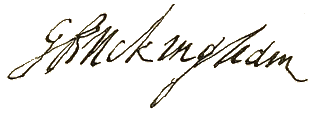
- Signature

George Villiers, 1st Duke of Buckingham (/ˈvɪlərz/ VIL-ərz; 20 August 1592 – 23 August 1628), was an English courtier and statesman who was a notable patron of the arts. He was a favourite and self-described "lover" of King James VI and I. Buckingham remained at the height of royal favour for the first three years of the reign of James's son, Charles I, until he was assassinated.

Villiers was born in Brooksby, Leicestershire, into a family of minor gentry. His ascent began notably in 1614 when, aged 21, he caught the attention of the King. His achievements include being knighted and climbing the ranks of nobility, eventually becoming the Duke of Buckingham in 1623. Villiers was the last in a succession of handsome young favourites on whom the King lavished affection and patronage. The pair were often accused of sodomy and most historians today believe the relationship was sexual in nature.

Villiers's influence extended beyond the King's favour; he played a significant role in political and military affairs, including the negotiation of royal marriages and leading military expeditions. His tenure as Lord High Admiral and de facto foreign minister was marked by a series of failed military campaigns, such as the ill-fated Cádiz expedition (1625), which damaged his reputation and public image. Buckingham's assassination in 1628 by John Felton, a disgruntled army officer, highlighted the extent of his unpopularity among the public.

== Early life ==
Villiers was born in Brooksby, Leicestershire, on 20 August 1592, the second son of the minor gentleman Sir George Villiers (1550–1606) by his second wife. His mother, Mary (1570–1632), daughter of Anthony Beaumont of Glenfield, Leicestershire, was widowed early. She educated her son for a courtier's life and sent him to travel in France with John Eliot.

Villiers took to the training set by his mother: he could dance and fence well, spoke a little French, and overall became an excellent student. Godfrey Goodman (Bishop of Gloucester from 1624 to 1655) declared Villiers "the handsomest-bodied man in all of England; his limbs so well compacted, and his conversation so pleasing, and of so sweet a disposition".

== Ascent at court ==
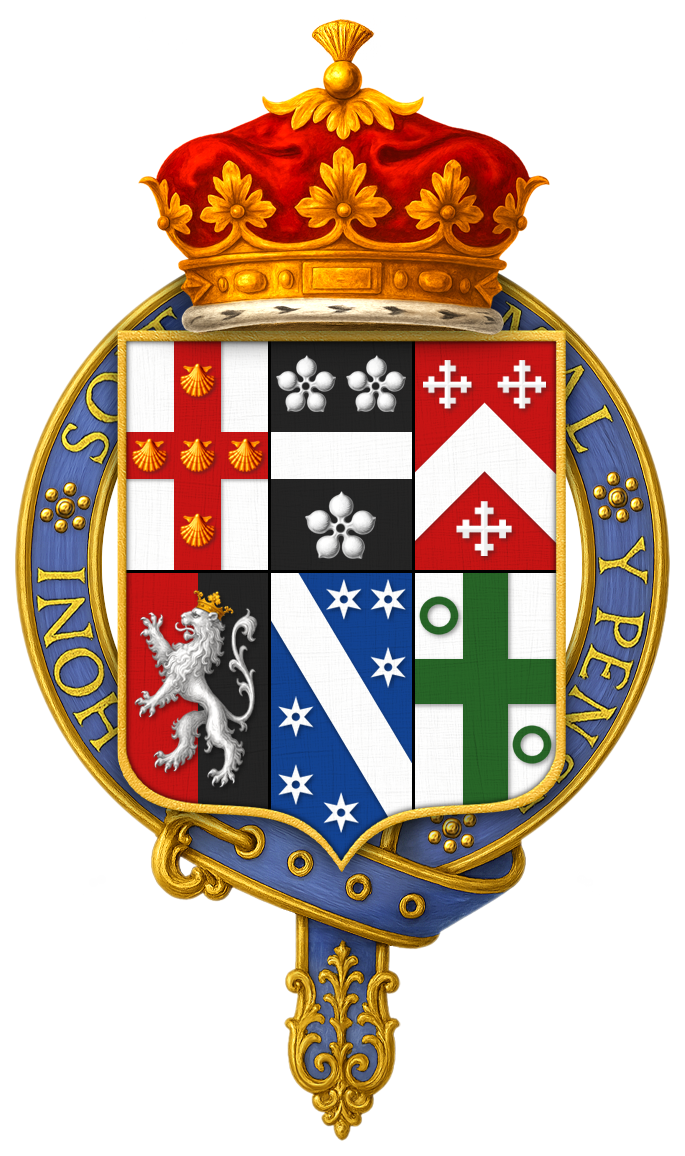
Garter-encircled arms of George Villiers, 1st Duke of Buckingham, KG, as quartered on his stall plate (N19/9) within St George's Chapel

In August 1614, at age twenty-one, Villiers caught the eye of King James VI and I at a hunt in Apethorpe. Opponents of the King's then favourite, the 1st Earl of Somerset, saw an opportunity to displace Somerset and began promoting Villiers. Money was raised to purchase Villiers a new wardrobe, and intense lobbying secured his appointment as Royal Cup-bearer, a position that allowed him to make conversation with the King. Villiers began to appear as a dancer in masques from 1615, in which he could exhibit his grace of movement and beauty of body, a recognised avenue to royal favour since the time of Queen Elizabeth I.

Under the King's patronage, Villiers advanced rapidly through the ranks of the nobility, and his court appointments grew in importance. In April 1615 he was knighted as a Gentleman of the Bedchamber. In 1616, when he became the King's Master of the Horse, he was elevated to the peerage as Baron Whaddon, Viscount Villiers, and made a Knight of the Garter. The next year he was made Earl and in 1618 he was promoted to being Marquess of Buckingham; then finally in 1623, he was created Duke of Buckingham. Villiers's new rank allowed him to dance side by side with the royal heir Charles, with whom his friendship developed through his tutoring of the Prince in dance.

Villiers was appointed Lord High Admiral of England in 1619, and in 1623 the former Dukedom of Buckingham was recreated for him when he was negotiating abroad on the King's behalf. Since the Dukedom of Norfolk had lapsed in 1572 with the attainder and execution of the 4th Duke of Norfolk, Buckingham now became the only English duke who, at the time, was not a member of the royal family (James's two sons were Duke of Cornwall and Duke of York).

== Relationship with James VI & I ==
Villiers was the last in a succession of handsome young favourites on whom the King lavished affection and patronage. The extent to which the relationship between the two was sexual has been much discussed. James's nickname for Buckingham was "Steenie", after St. Stephen, who was said to have had "the face of an angel". Speaking to the Privy Council in 1617, James tried to clarify the situation:

You may be sure that I love the Earl of Buckingham more than anyone else, and more than you who are here assembled. I wish to speak in my own behalf and not to have it thought to be a defect, for Jesus Christ did the same, and therefore I cannot be blamed. Christ had John, and I have George.

Historian David M. Bergeron claims "Buckingham became James's last and greatest lover" citing flowery letters that followed 17th-century styles of masculinity.

In a letter to Buckingham in 1623, the King ended with the salutation, "God bless you, my sweet child and wife, and grant that ye may ever be a comfort to your dear father and husband". Buckingham reciprocated the King's affections, writing back to James: "I naturally so love your person, and adore all your other parts, which are more than ever one man had", "I desire only to live in the world for your sake" and "I will live and die a lover of you". Buckingham himself provides ambiguous evidence, writing to James many years later that he had pondered "whether you loved me now...better than at the time which I shall never forget at Farnham, where the bed's head could not be found between the master and his dog".

Speculation about the close relationship between King and favourite was not confined to Great Britain. It was carried back to France by the poet Théophile de Viau, who was resident in England in 1621 and had then addressed to Buckingham the flattering ode Au marquis du Boukinquan. On his return, he went on to justify his own masculine preferences by a witty appeal both to Classical mythology and to the contemporary gossip:

Apollo with his songs
Debauched young Hyacinth
...
And that learned English king,
Wasn't Buckingham his fuck?

== Influence under James VI & I ==
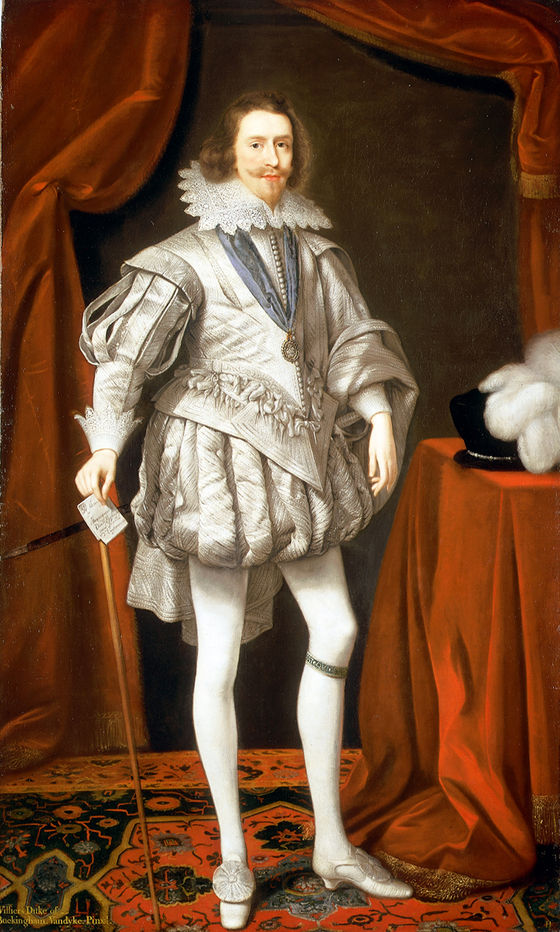
Villiers as Lord High Admiral, a portrait by Daniel Mytens the Elder, 1619

Until King James died in March 1625, Buckingham was the King's constant companion and closest advisor, enjoying control of all royal patronage. Buckingham used his influence to prodigiously enrich his relatives and advance their social positions, which soured public opinion towards him.

In his rise to power, Buckingham became connected with the philosopher and jurist Sir Francis Bacon. Bacon wrote letters of advice to the young favourite and drafted the patent of nobility when Buckingham ascended to the peerage. With Buckingham's support, Bacon was appointed Lord Chancellor in 1618. In gratitude, Bacon honoured Buckingham's many requests for favours from the court for friends and allies. Following an investigation by Parliament into royal grants of monopoly, financial speculation and corrupt officials, Bacon was convicted of corruption and forced into retirement. Neither Buckingham nor the King attempted to intervene on Bacon's behalf. Many of Buckingham's contemporaries believed he had sacrificed Bacon to save himself from Parliamentary scrutiny, as he had been liberally spending public funds and accepting gifts and bribes.

From 1616, Buckingham also established a dominant influence in Irish affairs, beginning with the appointment of his client, Sir Oliver St John, as Lord Deputy, 1616–22. Thence, he acquired control of the Irish customs farm (1618), dominated Irish patronage at court, particularly with the sale of Irish titles and honours, and (from 1618) began to build substantial Irish estates for himself, his family and clients—with the aid of a plantation lobby, composed of official clients in Dublin. To the same end, he secured the creation of an Irish Court of Wards in 1622. Buckingham's influence thus crucially sustained an aggressive Irish plantation policy into the 1620s.

When Parliament began its investigation into monopolies and other abuses in England, and later Ireland in 1621, Buckingham made a show of support to avoid action being taken against him. However, the King's decision to send a commission of inquiry to Ireland, which included parliamentary firebrands, threatened to expose Buckingham's growing, often clandestine, interests there. Knowing that the King had assured the Spanish ambassador that the Parliament would not be allowed to imperil a Spanish matrimonial alliance, he therefore surreptitiously instigated a conflict between the Parliament and the King over the Spanish match, which resulted in the Parliament's premature dissolution in December 1621 and a hobbling of the Irish commission in 1622. Irish reforms introduced in 1623–24 by Lionel Cranfield, 1st Earl of Middlesex, the Lord Treasurer, were largely nullified by Middlesex's impeachment and disgrace in the violently anti-Spanish 1624 parliament—spurred on by Buckingham and Prince Charles.

== Charles I, the Lord Admiral and foreign affairs ==
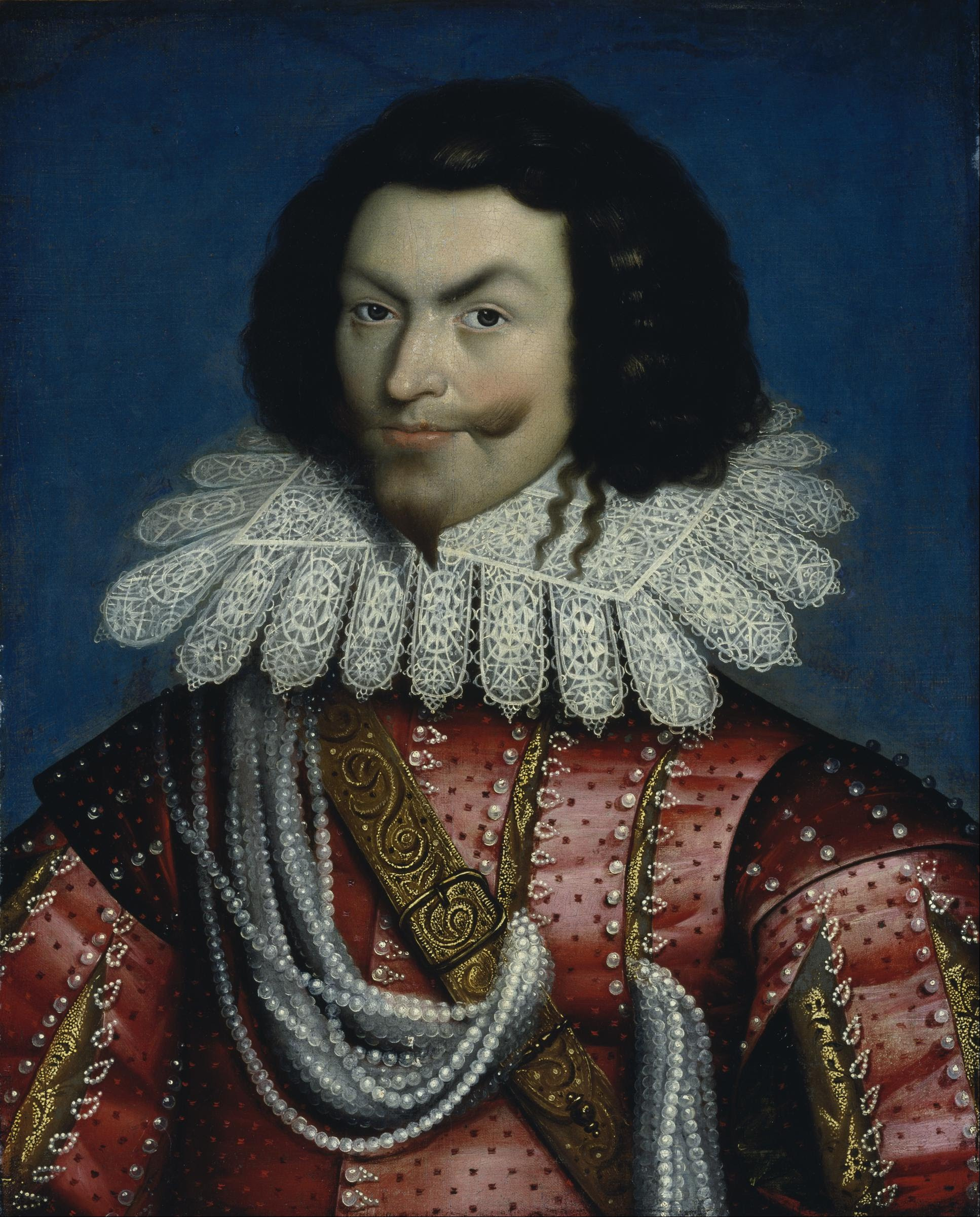
Portrait by Paul van Somer I, before 1622

In 1623 Buckingham, now Lord Admiral and effective Foreign Minister, accompanied Charles I, then Prince of Wales, to Spain for marriage negotiations regarding the Infanta Maria. The negotiations had long been stuck, but it is believed that Buckingham's crassness was key to the total collapse of the agreement, and they returned in a black mood. The Spanish ambassador asked Parliament to have Buckingham executed for his behaviour in Madrid, but Buckingham gained popularity by calling for war with Spain on his return.

Buckingham headed further marriage negotiations, but when, in December 1624, the betrothal to Henrietta Maria of France was announced, the choice of a Catholic was widely condemned. He visited France in May 1625 to assist in the negotiations, during which he was allegedly "embroiled in a plot to seduce the Queen of France", Anne of Austria, according to historian Desmond Seward. At Amiens, "where the court took official leave of the English embassy, Buckingham climbed into a private garden where the queen was taking an evening walk", and "may even have tried to rape her", although "Anne's shrieks summoned her attendants." King Louis XIII "was so affronted that henceforward he refused to think seriously of an English alliance."

Buckingham, whose popularity had suffered a further setback as a result of these events, took a decision to help the rebellious Huguenot Admiral Benjamin, Duke of Soubise. An ardent Protestant, Buckingham ordered Sir John Penington to help; but the Royal Navy only succeeded in attacking Cardinal Richelieu's enemies, defeating his objects in August 1625 and losing La Rochelle. Similarly he was blamed for the failure of the military expedition under the command of Ernst von Mansfeld, a famous German mercenary general, sent to the continent to recover the Electorate of the Palatinate in 1625, which had belonged to Frederick V, Elector Palatine, son-in-law of King James I of England. However, when the Duke of York became King Charles I, Buckingham was the only man from the court of James to maintain his position.

In 1625, Buckingham proposed sending an expedition to Spain in an attempt to reenact what he viewed as the glorious actions of Sir Francis Drake by once again seizing the main Spanish port at Cádiz and burning the Spanish fleet in its harbour. Buckingham's past failures had provoked the House of Commons to refuse further levies of taxation to fund his extravagant adventures, but at the same time Parliament was intrigued by the prospect of dealing a blow to the international Catholic conspiracy, and the expedition was authorized. Yet even before the troops set sail the food prepared for the expedition was consumed awaiting the Board of Ordnance to deliver the required cannonry and musket balls. On this occasion, Buckingham himself was not in command. As experienced admirals were unavailable, Buckingham assigned command of the expedition to Sir Edward Cecil, a battle-hardened soldier who had won renown fighting on behalf of the Dutch against the Spanish. This choice of commander proved foolhardy, as while Cecil was a good soldier on land he had no knowledge of the sea.

Although Buckingham's plan was tactically sound, calling for landing further up the coast and marching the militia army on the city, the troops were badly equipped, ill-disciplined, and poorly trained. Coming upon a warehouse filled with wine, they simply got drunk, and the attack had to be called off. The English army briefly occupied a small port further down the coast before re-boarding its ships. After the embarrassing fiasco at Cádiz, Cecil decided to try to intercept a Spanish silver fleet on its way back to Spain from America. However, the Spanish were forewarned by their intelligence and easily avoided the planned ambush. With supplies running out and men sick and dying from starvation and disease, the English limped home in disgrace. Public opinion blamed Buckingham for yet another disaster, leading to serious political consequences. The Parliament of 1626 began the process of impeachment against Buckingham, causing King Charles to dissolve Parliament rather than risk a successful impeachment of his favourite.

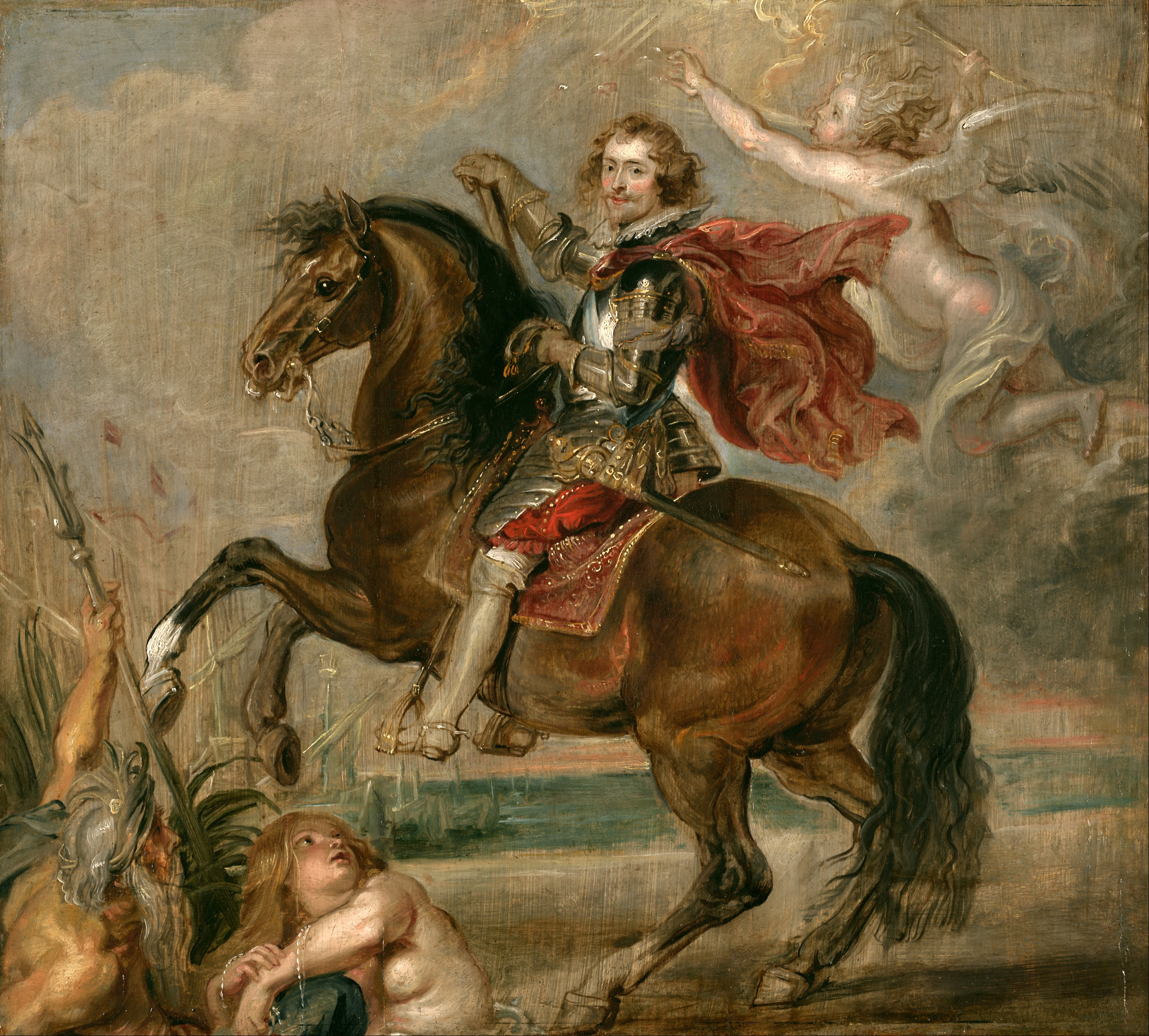
Study for Rubens's equestrian portrait, 1625, Kimbell Art Museum

Buckingham then negotiated with the French Chief Minister, Cardinal Richelieu, for English ships to aid Richelieu in his fight against the French Protestant Huguenots, in return for French aid against the Spanish occupying the Palatinate. Seven English warships participated in operations against La Rochelle and in the siege of Saint-Martin-de-Ré, but Parliament was disgusted and horrified at the thought of English Protestants fighting French Protestants. The plan only fuelled their fears of crypto-Catholicism at court. In the end, seven English ships were delivered to the French after much debate and were employed in the conflict, although they were essentially manned by French crews, as most of the English crews had refused to serve against their coreligionists and had disembarked in Dieppe. Following the successful recovery of Ré island by the French forces, the Treaty of Paris (1626) was signed between the city of La Rochelle and King Louis XIII on 5 February 1626, preserving religious freedom but imposing some guaranties against possible future rebellions. Moreover, the French made peace with the Spanish in April 1626, destroying any remaining hope of an Anglo-French alliance against the Habsburgs and obviating any further need to make a show of siding with the French crown against the Huguenots.

In 1627, Buckingham led another expeditionary force to relieve La Rochelle, once again attempting to aid the Huguenots rather than oppose them. To the remnants of the disastrous Cádiz expedition of 1625 were added newly pressed men, which allowed Buckingham to cobble together a force of around 6,000 men. As Parliament was still refusing to appropriate funds for further adventures as long as Buckingham was in charge, and Buckingham himself was nearly bankrupt, he funded the force with help from Sir William Russell, the two men raising approximately £70,000 between them to pay for the men, food, and supplies out of their own pockets. Raising the money took time, and the troops looted the King's stores after going unpaid for 10 months. Finally arriving in France in the summer of 1627, Buckingham besieged the fortress of Saint Martin on the isle of Ré, which was now controlled by royalist forces, but soon found himself trapped between the besieged forces and relief forces sent by Cardinal Richelieu. Realizing he risked annihilation, Buckingham abandoned the siege and fought his way back to his ships, but at a heavy cost: altogether, Buckingham lost more than 5,000 men in the brief campaign.

In April 1628, another English fleet was sent to relieve the Huguenots, this time under the command of William Feilding, 1st Earl of Denbigh, but Denbigh proved hesitant to fight the large, well-armed French fleet, and returned to Portsmouth without engaging the enemy. Thereafter, Buckingham tried to organise a third expedition, once again under his direct command, and was engaged in this enterprise when he was felled in Portsmouth by an assassin.

== Self-promotion through the arts ==
As a means of manoeuvring for political as well as court advancement, Villiers commissioned masques in which he was able to promote himself in a leading role. By appearing there as a dancer himself his grace of movement and beauty of body was put on show. By 1618 his elevation in rank allowed him to dance side by side with the royal heir, with whom his friendship developed through his tutoring of the prince in dance. "Command over his body had provided him with the privilege of commanding the moves of a future king". This culminated in connivance by his supporters in licensing Thomas Middleton's notorious play A Game at Chess (1624) as an extension of their anti-Spanish foreign policy. The duke and Prince Charles are acknowledged as figuring there as The White Duke and The White Knight, while very obvious depictions of the Spanish monarch and his former ambassador in England eventually brought about the play's closure.

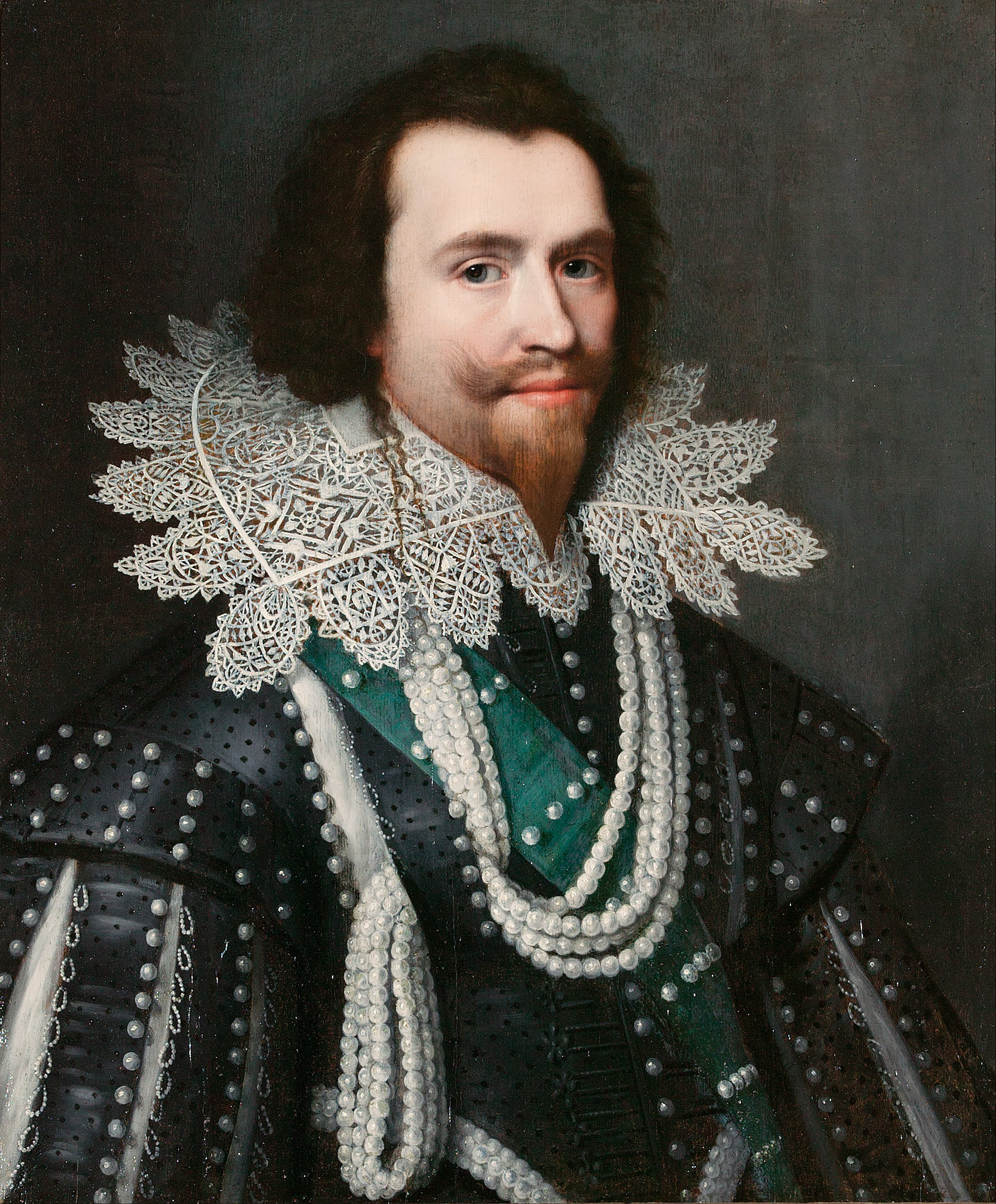
Michiel Jansz. van Mierevelt's pearl-studded portrait of the duke, 1625

Villiers also commissioned portraits of himself as "a medium for the cultivation of his personal image". William Larkin's portrait of 1616 records the start of his climb, showing him in the dress of a Knight of the Garter and emphasising the felicity of his stance and sumptuousness of dress. A 1619 portrait by Daniel Mytens the Elder is equally elegant. There he is dressed in white brocade and white silk hose, wearing the Garter and standing in a decor of costly silks. Another full-length portrait by the same artist celebrates his appointment as Lord High Admiral in 1619. Here he wears three-quarter armour; on the right, behind a balustrade, is a shoreline with the fleet beyond. Buckingham's growing wealth was emphasised by the detail of his clothes. This is evident in the lovingly depicted lace about his collar and cuffs in the full-length portrait by Cornelis Janssens van Ceulen. and the head and shoulders by Anthony van Dyck. The 1625 painting by Michiel van Miereveld is not only of unparalleled magnificence, with a jacket encrusted with pearls which also hang in ropes across it, but may also contain a reference to his diplomatic coup that year in negotiating the marriage of the future Charles I. At his entry to the French Court, he is recorded as wearing a grey velvet suit from which the loosely threaded pearls dropped to the ground as he advanced to make his bow to the queen, to the general wonder.

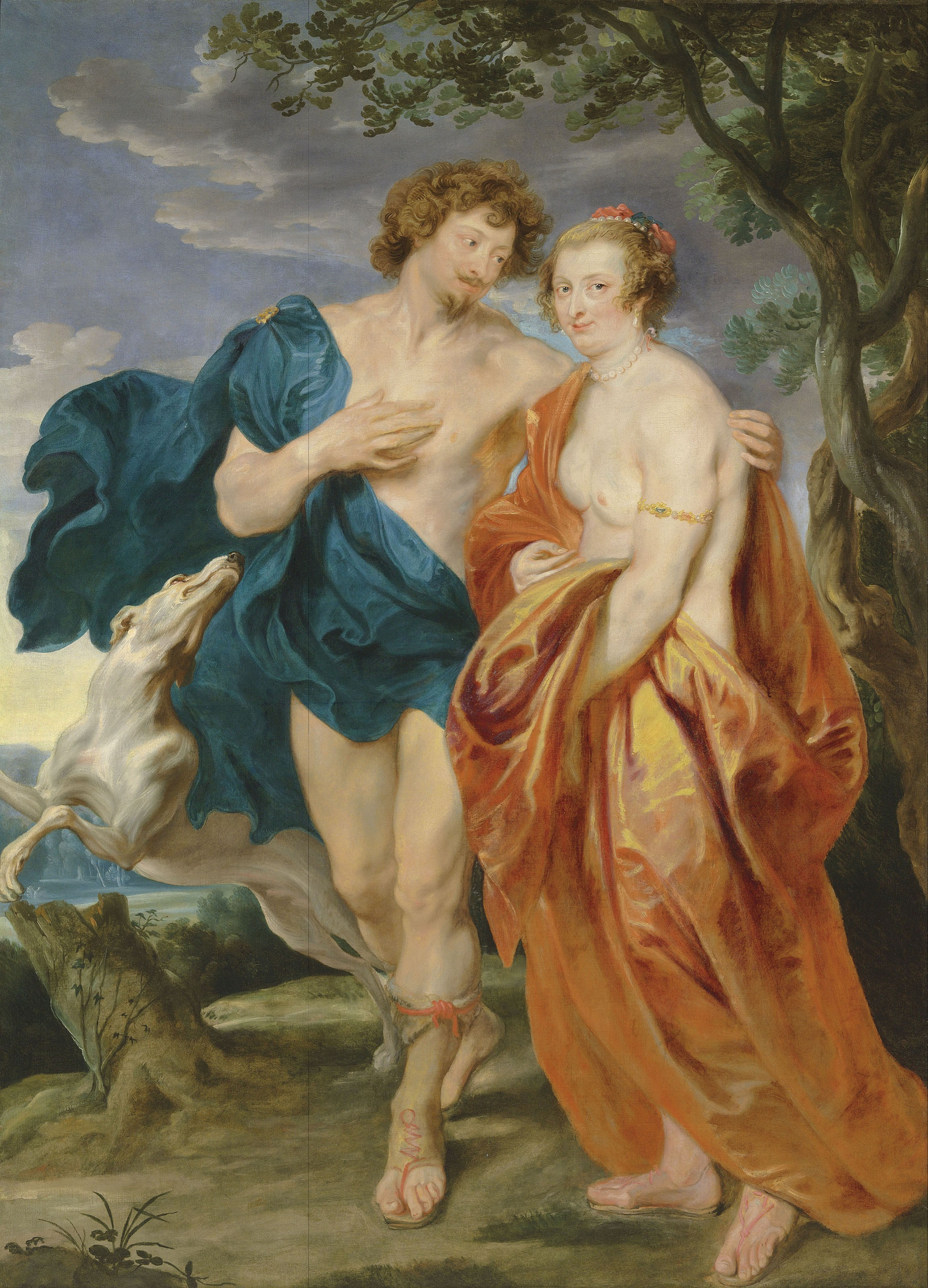
Van Dyck's double portrait of Buckingham and Manners

A series of more theatrical depictions heighten Buckingham's self-dramatisation and in certain cases make policy statements as well. Two of these are connected with his betrothal to and marriage with Lady Katherine Manners in 1620. In Anthony van Dyck's historical painting The Continence of Scipio, Buckingham is clearly recognisable standing at the centre, receiving from Scipio the hand of his captured betrothed. A mythical composition commissioned from van Dyck later commemorates the actual marriage. In contrast to the former painting, this was highly unconventional at the time. The couple are pictured all but naked as Venus and Adonis, emphasising heterosexual love and so countering all the rumours of the Duke's relations with the King. There is a further literary connection since the story is found in Ovid, but the picture again defies convention by hinting at a different, happier ending.

Buckingham probably met Peter Paul Rubens while conducting the royal marriage negotiations in Paris in 1625 and commissioned two ambitious advertisements of his standing from the painter. The first of these was destined for the ceiling of his York House residence and depicts a masque-like theme in which Minerva and Mercury conduct the Duke of Buckingham to the Temple of Virtue (also known as The Apotheosis of the Duke of Buckingham and The Duke of Buckingham Triumphing over Envy and Anger). In front of the marble temple to which he is carried upwards are the probable figures of Virtue and Abundance; the three Graces offer the Duke a crown of flowers, while Envy seeks to pull him down and a lion challenges him. The picture is an allegory of Buckingham's political aspirations and the forces that he saw as impeding him. Though the painting was destroyed in a fire in 1949, it was survived by a preparatory oil sketch now held in the National Gallery in London and by a copy of that sketch made by William Etty. Yet another Rubens portrait was rediscovered in 2017, when the painter's preparatory portrait of Buckingham was identified at Pollok House in Scotland.

Rubens's other major commission, Equestrian Portrait of the Duke of Buckingham (1625) is accounted "the finest state portrait of its date in England". The original was destroyed in a fire at the Le Gallais depository in St Helier, Jersey, on 30 September 1949, but a sketch by Rubens is now in the Kimbell Art Museum. A summation of his career to date, it depicts Buckingham as Lord High Admiral of the fleet that is just visible in the background. Several other personal references are also incorporated. As Master of the King's Horses, he sits on a Spanish jennet (a breed he introduced to Britain), lifting a baton as his horse rears on command. Beneath him, the sea god Neptune and a naiad adorned with pearls indicate the duke's dominion over the sea. Overhead, a winged allegory of Fame signals victory (which nevertheless evaded the commander in real life) with trumpet in hand. Privately Rubens noted Buckingham's "arrogance and caprice" and predicted that he was "heading for the precipice".

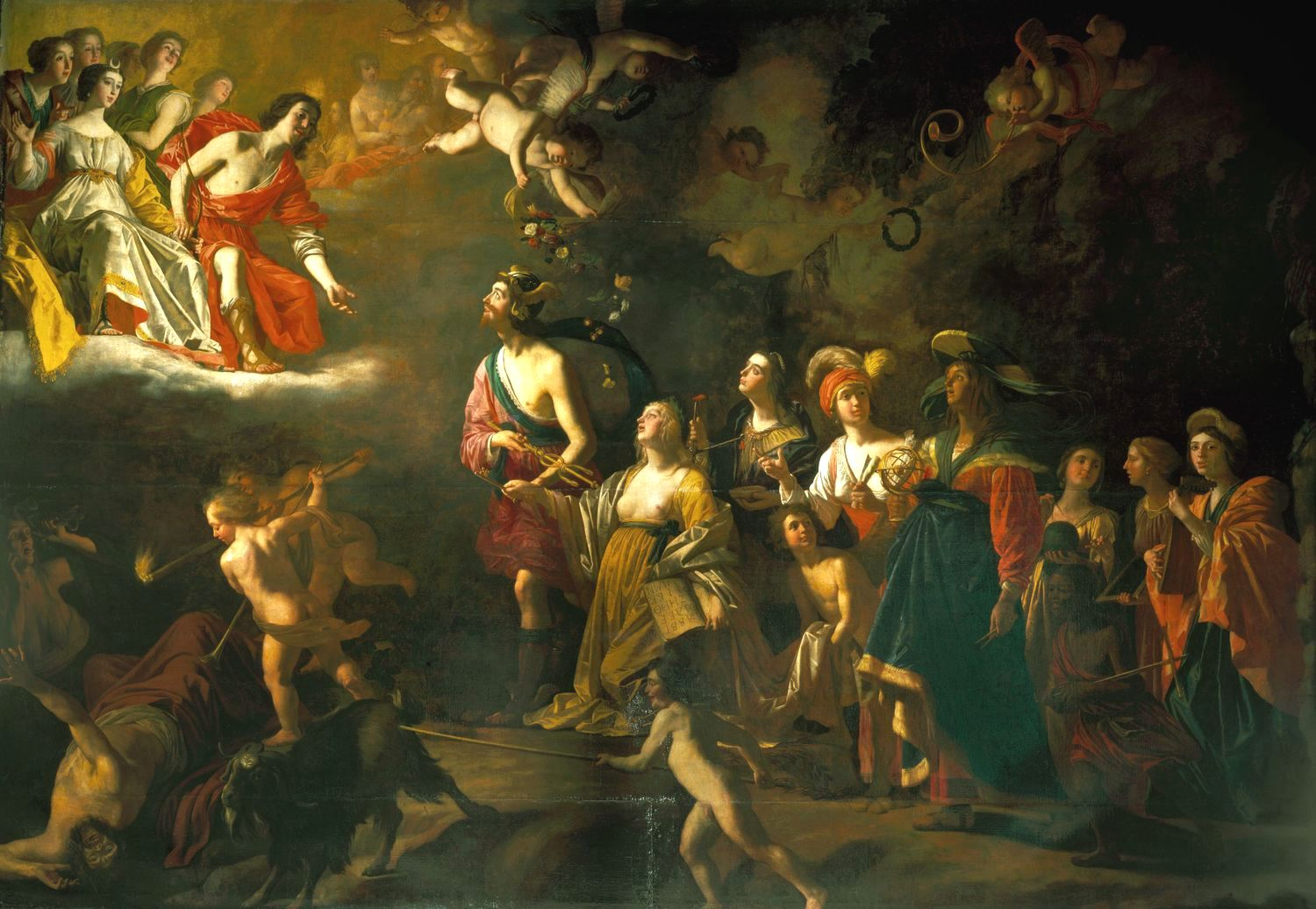
A mythological treatment of Buckingham in Gerrit van Honthorst's allegorical The Liberal Arts presented to King Charles and Henrietta Maria

Popular prints, often drawing on his painted portraits, particularly Miervelt's of 1625, had served to advertise Buckingham's position more broadly over the years. These now form part of the collection at the National Portrait Gallery. At the same time martial statements were being made through this medium in support of Buckingham's foreign policy, as for instance in Willem de Passe's equestrian portrait of the Duke, executed at the same time as Rubens was engaged on his monumental work on the same theme. There he is similarly depicted as Lord Admiral with a military baton in his right hand. During the 1627 expedition that he led personally, Buckingham was recorded as sponsoring "an unprecedented campaign of intensive print propaganda".

In 1628, during the political turmoil that culminated in his assassination, Buckingham commissioned another masque-like painting from Gerard van Honthorst, The Liberal Arts presented to King Charles and Henrietta Maria. In this the Duke is cast as Mercury, the patron of the arts, the procession of whom is brought in his train to the presence of the King and Queen in the guise of Apollo and Diana. Buckingham had taken part in the masque Mercury Vindicated at the start of his career in 1615.

== Assassination ==
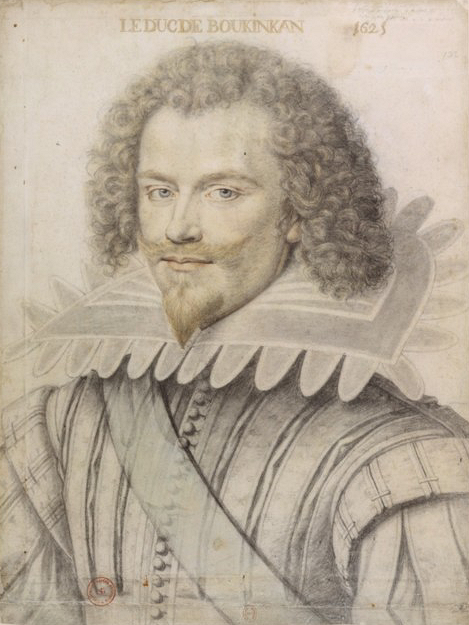
Drawing made in Paris by Daniel Dumonstier, 1625

During the course of the Duke's incompetent leadership, Parliament twice attempted to impeach him. The King rescued him both times by dissolving Parliament, but public feeling was so inflamed as a result that the Duke was widely blamed as a public enemy. Eventually his physician, Dr. John Lambe, popularly supposed to assert a diabolic influence over him, was mobbed in the streets and died as a result. Among the pamphlets issued afterwards was one that prophesied

Let Charles and George do what they can,
The Duke shall die like Doctor Lambe.

The Duke was stabbed to death on 23 August 1628 at the Greyhound Inn in Portsmouth, where he had gone to organise yet another campaign to aid La Rochelle. According to the eyewitness account sent by Dudley Carleton, 1st Viscount Dorchester to the Queen, "he turned about, uttering only this word, villaine! and never spoke more: but presently, plucking out the knife from himself, before he fell to the ground, he made towards the traitor two or three paces, and then fell against a table." The assassin was John Felton, an army officer who had been wounded in the earlier military adventure and believed he had been passed over for promotion by Buckingham.

Such was the Duke's unpopularity by this time that Felton was widely acclaimed as a hero by the public. A large number of poems celebrating Felton and justifying his action were published. Copies of written statements Felton carried in his hat during the assassination were also widely circulated. Many of these described Buckingham as effeminate, cowardly and corrupt, and contrasted him with Felton, who was held up as an example of manliness, courage and virtue. The son of Alexander Gill the Elder was sentenced to a fine of £2000 and the removal of his ears, after being overheard drinking to the health of Felton, and stating that Buckingham had joined King James in hell. However, these punishments were remitted after his father and Archbishop William Laud appealed to King Charles I. Felton was hanged on 29 November and his body was taken to Portsmouth for public display. However, this proved to be a miscalculation by the authorities as it became an object of veneration by the public.

== Tomb ==
Buckingham was buried in a side-chapel of the Lady Chapel of Westminster Abbey. His lavish tomb bears a Latin inscription that may be translated as "The Enigma of the World". Here, too, he was depicted surrounded by mythical figures. The black marble sculptures at each corner include Mars and Neptune, in reference to his military and naval exploits; on the catafalque lie bronze-gilt effigies of the Duke and his wife (who long survived him), cast by Hubert Le Sueur. Buckingham is clad in armour, enriched with crossed anchors and with an ermine cloak over it. He wears on his breast the chain and Great George pendant of the Garter and on his head a ducal coronet, summing up the principal steps in his brief career. He had died at the age of 35.

== Marriage and children ==
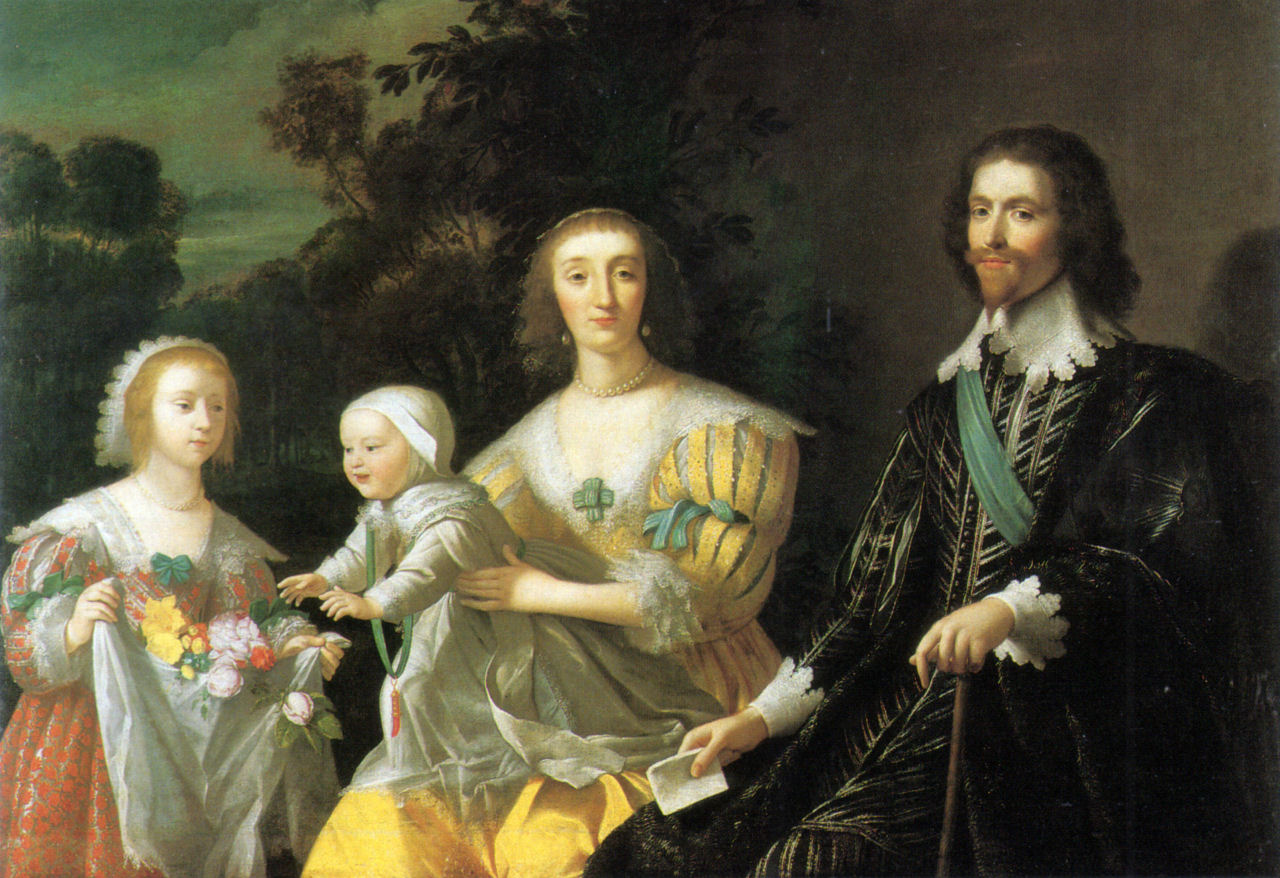
Buckingham with his wife Katherine Manners, their daughter Mary and son George. Gerrit van Honthorst, 1628

Buckingham married Lady Katherine Manners, the daughter of Francis Manners, 6th Earl of Rutland, later suo jure Baroness de Ros, on 16 May 1620, against her father's objections. The children of this marriage were:

1. Mary Villiers (before 30 March 1622 – November 1685), married firstly Charles Herbert, Lord Herbert; secondly James Stewart, 1st Duke of Richmond and thirdly Colonel Thomas Howard.
2. Charles Villiers, Earl of Coventry (17 November 1625 – 16 March 1627), died in infancy.
3. George Villiers, 2nd Duke of Buckingham (30 January 1628 – 16 April 1687).
4. Lord Francis Villiers (bef. 21 April 1629 – 7 July 1648), died in a skirmish at Kingston during the Second English Civil War.

== Legacy ==
Crop of Christopher and John Greenwood's 8 inch-to-mile map published in 1827 from an 1830 republication (click to view all), showing George Court, Villiers Street, Duke Street, Of Alley and Buckingham Street; some have since been renamed.

During the Duke's short tenure as Chancellor of the University of Cambridge, he had initiated the purchase of Thomas van Erpe's collection of oriental books and manuscripts on its behalf, although his widow only transferred it to Cambridge University Library after his death. With it came the first book in Chinese to be added to the library's collections.

After Buckingham's assassination, a large amount of satirical verse was circulated on the subject. Most of this reflected on how pride goes before a fall and the damage he had done to the kingdom, while several pieces commended John Felton's action.

The Duke's residence of York House occupied what eventually became the Adelphi district in London. When his son sold the area to developers, it was on condition that his father and titles were commemorated in naming the new streets. These were, accordingly, George Court, Villiers Street, Duke Street, Of Alley and Buckingham Street.

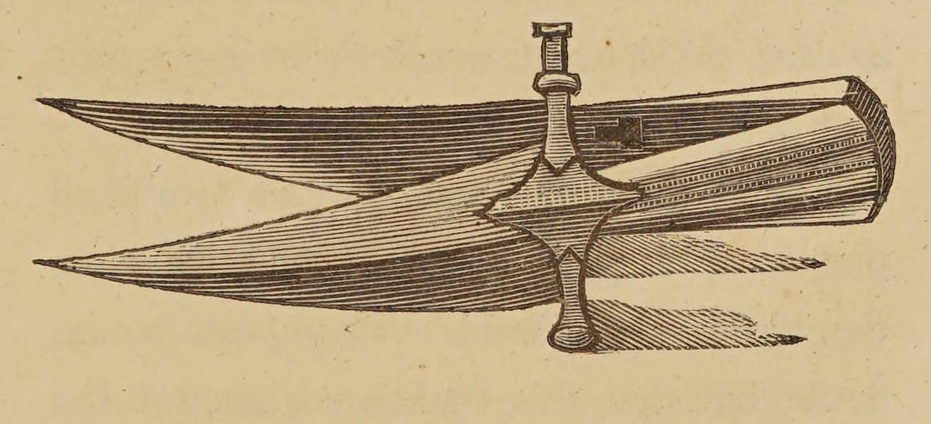
A 1795 sketch by Samuel Ireland of the dagger purportedly used by Felton to assassinate Buckingham

There are 18th and 19th century accounts of a dagger on display at Newnham Paddox in Warwickshire, that was claimed to be the one used to assassinate Buckingham. Newnham Paddox was the family seat of the Earls of Denbigh and Buckingham's sister, Susan, had married William Feilding, 1st Earl of Denbigh. How the dagger (if authentic) came to be at Newnham Paddox was explained by it being recovered after the assassination and sent to Buckingham's widow, who was also living there.

== Fictional appearances ==
A fictionalised Buckingham is one of the characters in Alexandre Dumas's celebrated 1844 novel The Three Musketeers, which paints him as in love with Anne of Austria, as well as dealing with the siege of La Rochelle and his assassination by Felton. He is described:

At thirty-five, which was then his age, he passed, with just title, for the handsomest gentleman and the most elegant cavalier of France or England. The favourite of two kings, immensely rich, all-powerful in a kingdom which he disordered at his fancy and calmed again at his caprice, George Villiers, Duke of Buckingham, had lived one of those fabulous existences which survive, in the course of centuries, to astonish posterity.

In the 1973 two-film, Anglo-American adaptation of the book – The Three Musketeers and The Four Musketeers – Simon Ward plays Buckingham, in a prominent role as an ally of the main characters. The second film includes his assassination by Felton, but (following the original novel in this) depicts the killing as being orchestrated by the fictional Milady de Winter, an agent of the principal villain, Cardinal Richelieu.

Taylor Caldwell's The Arm and the Darkness (1943) also deals with this period in France, while Hilda Lewis' Wife to Great Buckingham (1959) goes so far as to make Buckingham's love for the French queen the main cause of his undoing. The Duke also figures in historical romances like Evelyn Anthony's Charles, The King (1963) and Bertrice Small's Darling Jasmine (2007), although the main focus there is on other protagonists. The Spanish match and Buckingham's part in it is made an episode in Spanish author Arturo Pérez-Reverte's novel El Capitán Alatriste (1996). There he and the then Prince of Wales are the subjects of an assassination attempt by Spanish plotters.

In Philippa Gregory's Earthly Joys (1998), which has as its subject the famous gardener John Tradescant the Elder, the Duke appears halfway through the novel as the object of Tradescant's love. Another historical fiction, Ronald Blythe's The Assassin (2004), is written from his killer's point of view as a final confession while awaiting execution in the Tower of London.

In 2011 Buckingham was portrayed by Orlando Bloom in a film version of The Three Musketeers. In 2023–24 Buckingham featured in various filmed dramas; he was played by Nicholas Galitzine in the TV miniseries Mary & George in Britain, and by Jacob Fortune-Lloyd in the paired French films The Three Musketeers: D'Artagnan and The Three Musketeers: Milady.

== Notes ==
Political offices
Preceded by The Earl of Worcester	Master of the Horse; 1616–1628	Succeeded by The Earl of Holland
Preceded by The Baron Ellesmere	Lord Lieutenant of Buckinghamshire; 1616–1628	Succeeded by The Earl of Montgomery
Preceded by Sir Francis Fortescue	Custos Rotulorum of Buckinghamshire; 1617–1628	Succeeded by The Earl of Bridgewater
Preceded by The Earl of Nottingham	Lord High Admiral; 1619–1628	Succeeded by In Commission (First Lord: The Earl of Portland)
Preceded by The Lord Wotton	Lord Lieutenant of Kent; 1620	Succeeded by The Duke of Lennox
Preceded by In Commission	Lord Lieutenant of Middlesex; 1622–1628	Succeeded by The Earl of Dorset; The Earl of Holland
Preceded by The Earl of Exeter	Custos Rotulorum of Rutland; 1623–1628	Succeeded by The Lord Noel
Honorary titles
Preceded by The Lord Zouche	Lord Warden of the Cinque Ports; 1625–1628	Succeeded by The Earl of Suffolk
Legal offices
Preceded by The Earl of Shrewsbury	Justice in Eyre north of the Trent; 1616–1619	Succeeded by The Earl of Rutland
Preceded by The Earl of Nottingham	Justice in Eyre south of the Trent; 1625–1628	Succeeded by The Earl of Pembroke
Peerage of England
New creation	Duke of Buckingham; 1623–1628	Succeeded by George Villiers
New creation	Marquess of Buckingham; 1618–1628	Succeeded by George Villiers
New creation	Earl of Buckingham; 1617–1628	Succeeded by George Villiers
New creation	Viscount Villiers; 1616–1628	Succeeded by George Villiers
