= Sinner (Douglass novel) =

Novel by Sara Douglass

- Sinner first edition cover.
- Author: Sara Douglass
- Language: English
- Series: The Wayfarer Redemption
- Genre: Fantasy
- Publisher: HarperCollins
- Publication date: 1997
- Publication place: Australia
- Media type: Print (Paperback & Hardback)
- Pages: 495 (first edition)
- ISBN: 0-7322-5857-X
- OCLC: 37835909
- Dewey Decimal: 823 21
- LC Class: PR9619.3.D672 G56 1997
- Followed by: Pilgrim

Sinner is a fantasy novel by Sara Douglass, the first novel in The Wayfarer Redemption Trilogy. In the United States it is also considered the fourth in The Wayfarer Redemption sextet. It is followed by Pilgrim and concludes in Crusader.

== Plot summary ==
Axis chooses to leave the mortal world with his wife Azhure, leaving his son Caelum to rule as the Starson.

Matters worsen when Caelum finds himself engaging in affair with his sister Riverstar, who eventually becomes pregnant and threatens to blackmail her brother with this fact. The ancient and deadly WolfStar also returns to the world of Tencendor; seeking to cause the rebirth of his lover Niah within a powerful body. He selects Zenith as the perfect host, displacing her soul and replacing it with Niah's. However, WolfStar is not the only one to return; the newly empowered Faraday arrives and aids Zenith in expelling both Niah's soul and WolfStar's child from her body.

Meanwhile, Drago discovers an odd oasis in the universe outside the Star Gate, containing an insane Icarii woman, many children with the likeness of hawks and five dark and dangerous beings known as the Timekeepers who offer great power. This promise proves false however, when they steal Drago's life force and use it to shatter the Star Gate and destroy most of the world's magic in the process.

== Reception ==
Lynne Bispham of Vector wrote: "It is as though this first volume is really just setting the scene for later volumes in the trilogy, and it may be unfair to judge it until it can be read in conjunction with volumes two and three."

== See also ==
- Wayfarer Redemption
