= Art patronage of George Villiers, 1st Duke of Buckingham =

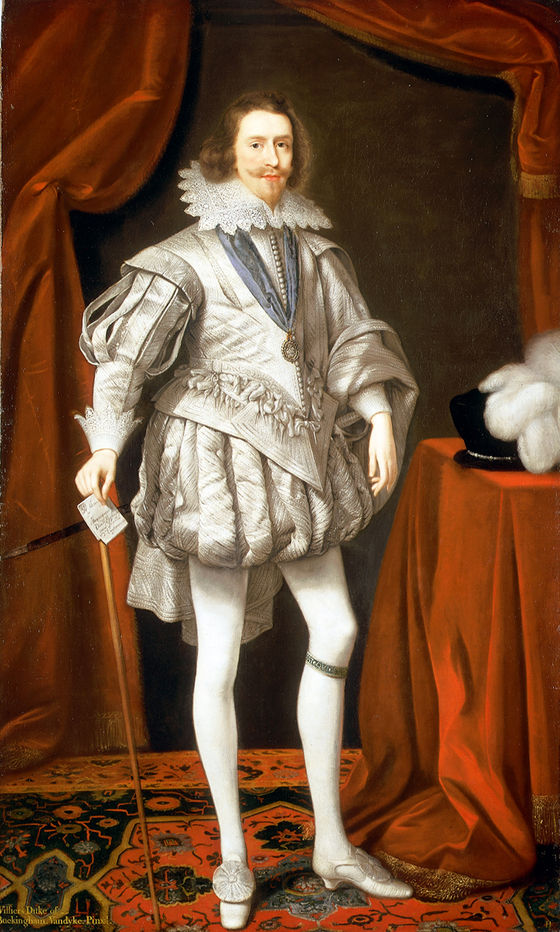
Villiers as Lord High Admiral, a portrait by Daniel Mytens the Elder, 1619

George Villiers, 1st Duke of Buckingham commissioned works of art (paintings and plays) to enhance his personal image, as a means to aid his political career and advancement at court.

== History ==
As a means of maneuvering for political as well as court advancement, Villiers commissioned masques in which he was able to promote himself in a leading role. "Command over his body had provided him with the privilege of commanding the moves of a future king". This culminated in connivance by his supporters in licensing Thomas Middleton's notorious play A Game at Chess (1624) as an extension of their anti-Spanish foreign policy. The Duke and Prince Charles are acknowledged as figuring there as The White Duke and The White Knight, while very obvious depictions of the Spanish monarch and his former ambassador in England eventually brought about the play's closure.

Villiers commissioned portraits of himself as "a medium for the cultivation of his personal image". William Larkin's portrait of 1616 records the start of his climb, showing him in the dress of a Knight of the Garter and emphasising the felicity of his stance and sumptuousness of dress. A 1619 portrait by Daniel Mytens the Elder is equally elegant. There he is dressed in white brocade and white silk hose, wearing the Garter and standing in a decor of costly silks. Another full-length portrait by the same artist celebrates his succession as Lord High Admiral in 1619. Here he wears three-quarter armour; on the right, behind a balustrade, is a shoreline with the fleet beyond. Buckingham's growing wealth was emphasised by the detail of his clothes. This is evident in the lovingly depicted lace about his collar and cuffs in the full-length portrait by Cornelis Janssens van Ceulen. and the head and shoulders by Anthony van Dyck. The 1625 painting by Michiel van Miereveld is not only of unparalleled magnificence, with a jacket encrusted with pearls which also hang in ropes across it, but may also contain a reference to his diplomatic coup that year in negotiating the marriage of the future Charles I. At his entry to the French Court, he is recorded as wearing a grey velvet suit from which the loosely threaded pearls dropped to the ground as he advanced to make his bow to the queen, to the general wonder.

A series of more theatrical depictions heighten Buckingham's self-dramatisation and in certain cases make policy statements as well. Two of these are connected with his betrothal to and marriage with Lady Katherine Manners in 1620. In Van Dyck's historical painting The Continence of Scipio, Buckingham is clearly recognisable standing at the centre, receiving from Scipio the hand of his captured betrothed. A mythical composition commissioned from Van Dyck later commemorates the actual marriage. In contrast to the former painting, this was highly unconventional at the time. The couple are pictured all but naked as Venus and Adonis, emphasising heterosexual love and so countering all the rumours of the Duke's relations with the king. There is a further literary connection, since the story is found in Ovid, but the picture again defies convention by hinting at a different, happier ending.

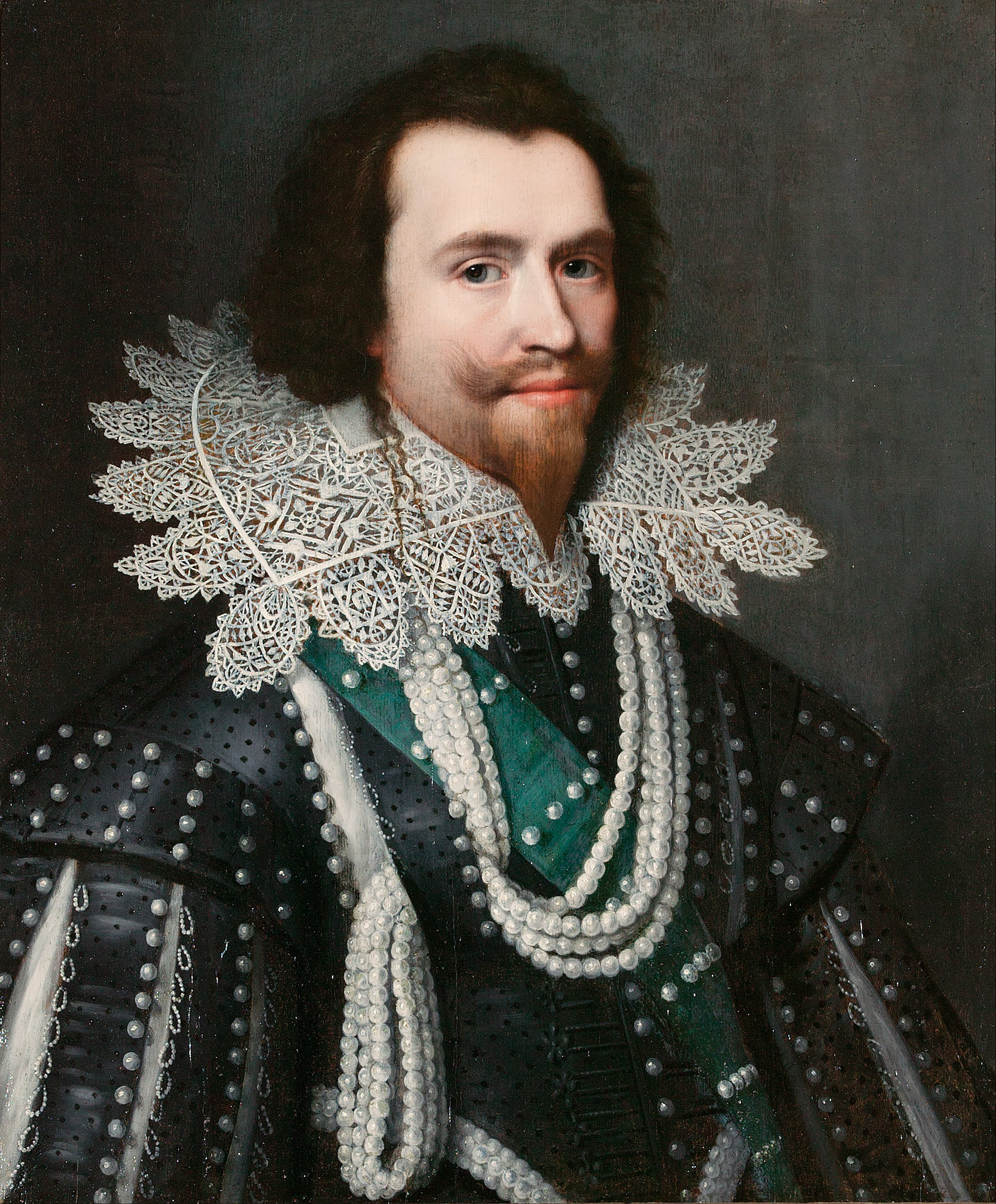
Michiel J. van Miereveld's pearl-studded portrait of the Duke, 1625

Buckingham probably met Peter Paul Rubens while conducting the royal marriage negotiations in Paris in 1625 and commissioned two ambitious advertisements of his standing from the painter. The first of these was destined for the ceiling of his residence, York House that depicts a masque-like theme in which Minerva and Mercury conduct the Duke of Buckingham to the Temple of Virtue (also known as The Apotheosis of the Duke of Buckingham and The Duke of Buckingham Triumphing over Envy and Anger). In front of the marble temple to which he is carried upwards are the probable figures of Virtue and Abundance; the three Graces offer the Duke a crown of flowers, while Envy seeks to pull him down and a lion challenges him. The picture is an allegory of Buckingham's political aspirations and the forces that he saw as impeding him. Though the painting was destroyed in a fire in 1949, it was survived by a preparatory sketch now held in the National Gallery in London and by a copy made by William Etty. Yet another study for the painting was rediscovered in 2017, when the painter's preparatory portrait of Buckingham, previously presumed lost, was identified at Pollok House in Scotland.

Rubens’ other major commission, Equestrian Portrait of the Duke of Buckingham (1625) is accounted "the finest state portrait of its date in England". The original was destroyed in a fire at the Le Gallais depository in St Helier, Jersey, on 30 September 1949, but a sketch by Rubens is now in the Kimbell Art Museum. A summation of his career to date, it depicts Buckingham as Lord High Admiral of the fleet that is just visible in the background. Several other personal references are also incorporated. As Master of the King's Horses, he sits on a Spanish jennet (a breed he introduced to Britain), lifting a baton as his horse rears on command. Beneath him, the sea god Neptune and a naiad adorned with pearls indicate the duke's dominion over the sea. Overhead, a winged allegory of Fame signals victory (which nevertheless evaded the commander in real life) with trumpet in hand. Privately Rubens noted Buckingham's "arrogance and caprice" and predicted that he was "heading for the precipice".

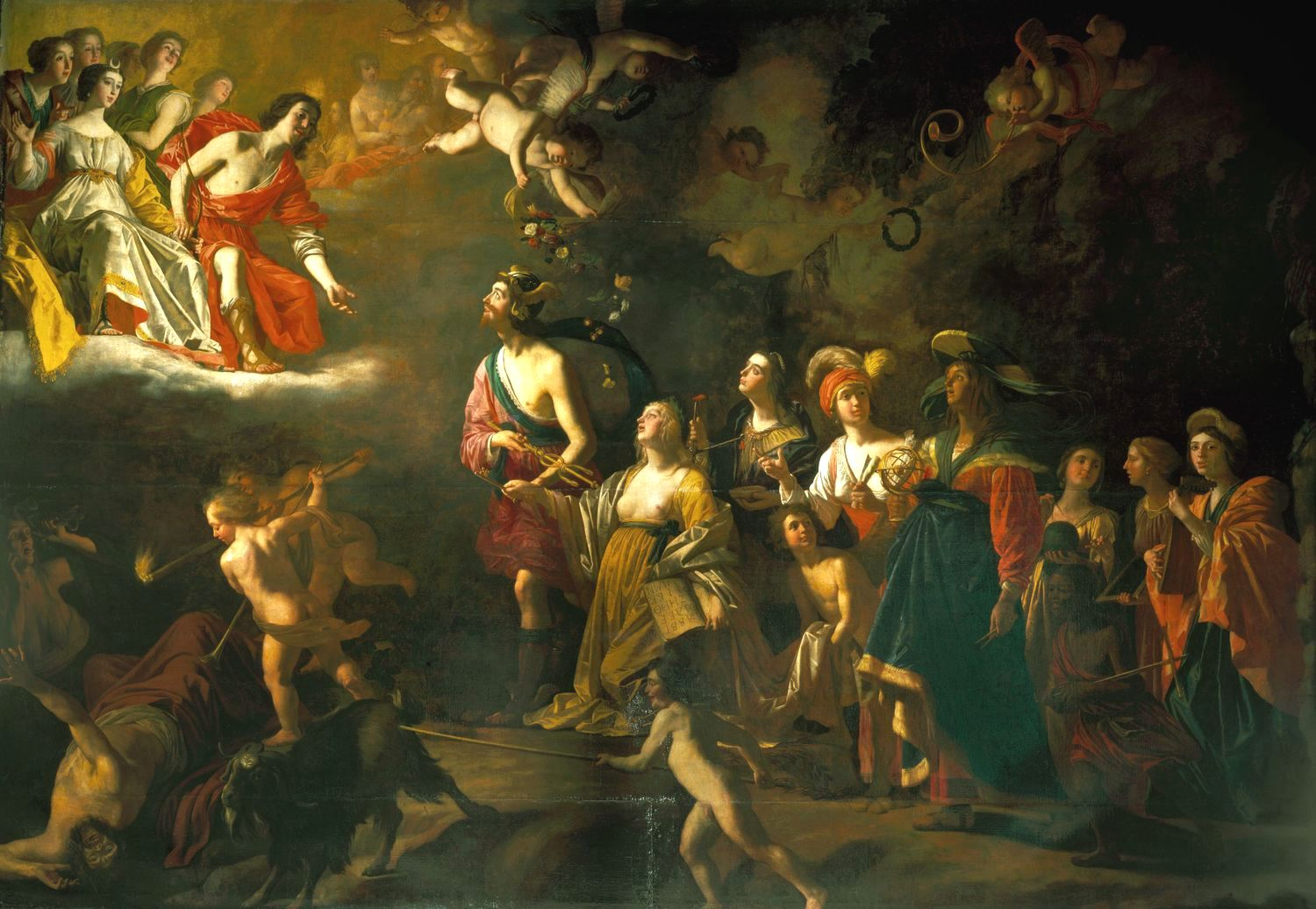
A mythological treatment of Buckingham in Gerrit van Honthorst's allegorical The Liberal Arts presented to King Charles and Henrietta Maria

Popular prints, often drawing on his painted portraits, particularly Miervelt's of 1625, had served to advertise Buckingham's position more broadly over the years. These now form part of the collection at the National Portrait Gallery. At the same time martial statements were being made through this medium in support of Buckingham's foreign policy, as for instance in Willem de Passe's equestrian portrait of the Duke, executed at the same time as Rubens was engaged on his monumental work on the same theme. There he is similarly depicted as Lord Admiral with a military baton in his right hand. During the 1627 expedition that he led personally, Buckingham was recorded as sponsoring "an unprecedented campaign of intensive print propaganda".

In 1628, during the political turmoil that culminated in his assassination, Buckingham commissioned another masque-like painting from Gerrit van Honthorst, The Liberal Arts presented to King Charles and Henrietta Maria. In this the Duke is cast as Mercury, the patron of the arts, the procession of whom is brought in his train to the presence of the king and queen in the guise of Apollo and Diana. In this validation of his artistic credentials, it is appropriate to remember that Buckingham had taken part in the masque Mercury Vindicated at the start of his career in 1615.
