= Battleaxe (novel) =

1995 novel by Sara Douglass

- Battleaxe first edition cover.
- Author: Sara Douglass
- Language: English
- Series: The Axis Trilogy
- Genre: Fantasy
- Publisher: Voyager Books
- Publication date: 7 May 1995
- Publication place: Australia
- Media type: Print (hardback & paperback)
- Pages: 674 (first edition)
- ISBN: 0-7322-5119-2
- OCLC: 37076305
- Followed by: Enchanter

Battleaxe is a fantasy novel by Australian author Sara Douglass, the first book in the Axis Trilogy.

== Plot summary ==
In the land of Achar, Faraday, the beautiful daughter of Earl Isend, is betrothed to Borneheld, son of the Princess Rivkah's son and King Priam's likely heir. Faraday is far more interested in Borneheld's half-brother, Axis, a warrior who is Rivkah's illegitimate son.

Evidence suggests that the Forbidden, who were driven out of Achar long ago, have returned. Axis embarks on an assignment to support the towns that may be facing the Forbidden. Faraday rides with him, but she is separated from Axis along the journey.

Faraday and her companions now travel to Gorkenfort, where Borneheld lives. She is unsettled by ideas and people she encounters, both along the way and by her husband's side.

As Axis continues his journey, he finds long-held belief challenged. He is told that his fate is intertwined with a prophecy about a world in which the human and the Forbidden live side by side, and that he may be the one to defeat Gorgrael, who is mounting a campaign to take over Achar.

== Reception ==
Kirkus Reviews wrote that while the "ingredients are familiar", Douglass "handles matters impressively" and the characters are "fully drawn". Publishers Weekly wrote that the novel is "strongest at the beginning", and that it "soon loses dramatic tension". Jackie Cassada of Library Journal wrote that "epic storytelling" makes the novel a "solid selection for most fantasy collections."
