= Threshold (Douglass novel) =

Novel by Sara Douglass

- Threshold first edition cover.
- Author: Sara Douglass
- Language: English
- Genre: Fantasy novel
- Publisher: Voyager Books
- Publication date: 29 January 1997
- Publication place: Australia
- Media type: Print (Hardback & Paperback)
- ISBN: 0-7322-5749-2
- OCLC: 38408586

Threshold is a 1997 fantasy novel by South Australian author Sara Douglass. The novel forms a prequel to Douglass's 'Darkglass Mountain' trilogy

== Plot ==
Set in the Egypt-like kingdom of Ashdod and primarily narrated by the glass-working slave Tirzah, the novel takes place during the final stages of the construction of the titular Threshold, an enormous glass-clad pyramid. Designed by the Magi, an order of mathematically obsessed sorcerers, it is meant to open a gateway into Infinity, allowing the Magi to pass through and unite themselves with the One, an abstract proto-Platonic ideal of perfection. When the pyramid is activated, however, it instead allows the demonic entity Nzame to cross from Infinity into Ashdod, taking control of its people and turning most of the land into stone and black glass. Among those who escape are Tirzah, who is secretly an "elemental cantomancer," able to communicate with the spirits of objects, principally those of glass, and her former master, the conflicted Magus Boaz, who may hold the key to the destruction of both Nzame and Threshold.
