= The Troy Game =

Novel series by Sara Douglass

- First edition covers.
- Hades' Daughter; God's Concubine; Darkwitch Rising; Druid's Sword
- Author: Sara Douglass
- Country: Australia
- Language: English
- Genre: Fantasy novel
- Publisher: HarperCollins
- Published: 2002-2006
- Media type: Print (hardback & paperback)

The Troy Game is a quartet of fantasy novels by Australian author Sara Douglass consisting of four books: Hades' Daughter, God's Concubine, Darkwitch Rising and Druid's Sword. It centres on a group of characters who are reincarnated at the end of each book and take the form of renowned historical figures from different ages. The entire series is set in London and focuses on the characters trying to complete the Troy Game, a kind of spell cast in the first book to protect the city.

== Books ==
=== 1. Hades' Daughter ===
Blurb: Created by gods. Destroyed by revenge. Reborn in the darkest magic of all. THE TROY GAME. The ancient Aegean sorcery lives on.
Theseus bested the Minotaur with the aid of Ariadne, Mistress of the Labyrinth. So when Theseus betrays her, Ariadne turns her wrath upon him and all his world, the catastrophe strikes the Mediterranean. Thera explodes, Atlantis sinks below the waves, poisons fill the air, tidal waves inundate nations, entire peoples are destroyed.
Amid the chaos, the great city of Troy falls, undone as much by Ariadne's revenge as by Greek cunning. Among the scattered Trojans wanders one man, Brutus, who carries with him the Troy Game, the greatest secret the western world has ever known. And Ariadne wants it – badly. As do her wicked daughter-heir successors.
The Greek goddess, Artemis appears to Brutus and offers him a splendid and powerful future if only he can resurrect the Troy Game. Hungry for power and a home for his people, Brutus accepts her challenge. And so the Troy Game begins, on the shores of the Thames in ancient Iron Age Britain.
But the malevolent Minotaur, Asterion, has escaped death and seeks to destroy the Game completely. And Cornelia, Brutus’ strange, unknowable wife, trails death in her wake.
Everywhere lurks Ariadne’s legacy of hatred, carrying western Europe into a maelstrom of darkness.

Taken from: Hades' Daughter, Sara Douglass, (c) 2002

=== 2. God's Concubine ===
Blurb: The Troy Game lives - but can anyone control it?
For 2000 years the Troy Game has survived Asterion’s murderous attempts to find Brutus’ Trojan kingship bands. Admitting defeat, Asterion must allow the rebirth of the Game’s creators…to lead him to the magical golden bands of Troy.
Now, two millennia after Genvissa and Brutus founded the Game, they find themselves reborn into a vastly different world, a world where they are separated by ambitions and hatreds endangered by the approaching Norman invasion of England. They discover that Cornelia has also returned, apparently more determined than previously to thwart them. And Coel has been reborn at her side, but this time with a sword in his hand.
Yet Brutus and Genvissa’s most deadly enemy may be the Troy Game itself. Left on its own for 2000 years, the Game has changed. Become aware. Become manipulative. Become devious. Become alive.
And Asterion, abroad in Anglo-Saxon London, is desperate to find it.

Taken from: God's Concubine, Sara Douglass, (c) 2004

=== 3. Darkwitch Rising ===
Blurb: Out of a city devastated by plague and fire rises the most powerful Darkwitch in history.
It is the seventeenth century, and once more the players of Troy Game are drawn back into its intricate dance. But this life there is a difference.
This life the Troy Game itself takes flesh, and walks.
Restoration London becomes the field of the most desperate battle yet. Can the Troy Game outmanoeuvre Asterion, who lurks in a nightmare lair he has built against the rear wall of the bone house of St Dunstan-in-the-East? It is here that Asterion traps Cornelia-reborn Noah Banks, and Genvissa-reborn Jane Orr. It is here that he manages the ultimate trickery in order to obtain the kingship bands, the Game and Noah.
But no one – not Asterion, not Brutus, not even Noah – could have anticipated an ancient Darkwitch rising from the dead with a secret so terrible it would not merely tear both the Game and land apart, but devastate any chance that Noah and her lover, Brutus can be together.

Taken from: Darkwitch Rising, Sara Douglass, (c) 2005

=== 4. Druid's Sword ===
Blurb: As Hitler unleashes his bombs on London, another, more ancient, terror emerges...
It is the early days of the Second World War. Grace - daughter of Asterion and Noah - remains bound in agony to Catling, her wrists cruelly scarred by the otherworldly restraints.
There are none, it seems, who can help Grace. Certainly not her mother or father.
Jack Skelton, Brutus-reborn and the love of Noah’s life, is the only one able to break through Grace’s carefully constructed barriers. It may be that Grace is not entirely helpless after all…
And while Genvissa-reborn and Coel-reborn attempt to identify exactly how to deal with the grip of the malevolent Troy Game, a killer stalks the streets of London creating terror upon terror as the bombers shadow the land.

Taken from: Druid's Sword, Sara Douglass, (c) 2006

Set during 1939-1941, mainly during the period of the London Blitz, from 7 September 1940 to 10 May 1941, the book centres on Jack Skelton's (Brutus') desperate search for a means to not only save London, but the Faerie and all those he loves. He seems helplessly trapped, unable to find a solution, watching many of those he loves best lost to death for all time, until one day he finds himself in a long forgotten crypt, staring at a piece of marzipan fruit on a chipped plate, a half-full decanter of whisky and two dirty glasses, and a receipt from a seedy hotel, all of which sit on a crumbling altar. Suddenly, he has an idea ...

== Recurring characters ==
- Brutus of Troy; later William the Conqueror, Louis De Silva, Major Jack Skelton and Ringwalker
- Cornelia; later Caela, Noah Banks and Eaving
- Coel; later Harold Godwinson, Charles II of England, Harold Cole and Lord of the Faerie
- Genvissa; later Swanne, Jane Orr, Stella Wentworth and the Caroller
- Asterion (The Minotaur); later Amorian the Poiteran, Aldred the Archbishop of York and Weyland Orr
- Grace Orr
- Catling (the Troy Game incarnate)
- Ecub; later Marguerite Carteret
- Erith; later Judith and Catherine (Kate) Pegge
- Matilda of Flanders; later Catharine of Braganza and Mrs Matilda Flanders
- Loth; later Saeweald, James Duke of York (eventually James II of England) and Walter Herne
- Long Tom the Sidlesaghe
- Reverend John Thornton; later George VI of the United Kingdom
- Ariadne
- Silvius; later Silvius Makris
- The Imps; later Bill and Jim Philpot (the Pentinent Rippers in Druid's Sword)
- Gog and Magog, legendary protectors of London
- Mag, previous goddess of the waters, predecessor to Eaving
- Og, previous god of the forests, predecessor to Ringwalker
- Prasutagus, husband of Boudicca; later Malcolm, Jack's servant in Druid's Sword
- The White Queen

== Books in the series ==
- Douglass, Sara (2002). Hades' Daughter. HarperCollins
- Douglass, Sara (2004). God's Concubine. HarperCollins
- Douglass, Sara (2005). Darkwitch Rising. HarperCollins
- Douglass, Sara (2006). Druid's Sword. HarperCollins

== Historical significance ==
Each book in the Troy Game series relates to a significant historical event in Britain's (particularly London's) history.
