= Pilgrim (Douglass novel) =

Novel by Sara Douglass

- Pilgrim first edition cover.
- Author: Sara Douglass
- Language: English
- Series: The Wayfarer Redemption
- Genre: Fantasy
- Publisher: HarperCollins
- Publication date: 1998
- Publication place: Australia
- Media type: Print (Paperback & Hardback)
- Pages: 749 (first edition)
- ISBN: 0-7322-5956-8
- OCLC: 222311705
- Preceded by: Sinner
- Followed by: Crusader

Pilgrim is the 1998 fantasy novel by Australian author Sara Douglass. It was first published in Australia as the second part of the "Wayfarer Redemption" series, then republished in the US and most of Europe as the fifth book of the Wayfarer Redemption sextet.

== Plot summary ==
Upon arriving through the Star Gate, the Time Keeper Demons begin 'feeding' by expelling a grey miasma from their mouths which spreads across the land, corrupting and maddening any being not sheltered. They depart the vicinity of the now destroyed Star Gate and travel through the woods to Cauldron Lake. Meanwhile Faraday uses her new powers to bring Drago back to life.

The newly resurrected Drago, Faraday, and Zenith then join Caelum's army in the woods surrounding the Barrows and set plans. Despite a pledge to help Caelum however possible, Axis, Azhure, and Caelum remain distrustful and loathing towards him with Axis even stabbing Drago.

Axis, Azhure, Caelum, and a small contingent from the army resolve to travel to Star Finger to search through the ancient texts there for an answer. Zared is left in command of the combined armies tasked with preserving what he can of the land. Faraday and Drago leave on a pair of white donkeys with a feathered lizard from the woods to attempt to beat the demons to Cauldron Lake. There the voice that spoke to Faraday during her transformation, Noah, awaits.

Isfrael and Shra confront the demons as they pass through the forest. Their combined power is a match for the still weak demons, but one of the newly acquired demonic mounts sneaks behind them and disembowels Shra. The demons are the first to arrive at Cauldron Lake and proceed to drain/kill it to expose the craft of the Enemy and a crystal forest. Surviving the reflective trap, the demons find a pool of blood and throw StarLaughter's dead child into the blood. It emerges as a toddler and possessing the warmth of the greatest of the demons, Qeteb. After their departure but still sensed by them, WolfStar comes forth from the waterways and places his own dead child in the blood with similar results.

Drago enters the craft and meets a dying Noah, the last of the Enemy. Noah tells Drago of how the Enemy separated Qeteb and journeyed through space to find a place to store the component parts. When they discovered the constituent parts of Qeteb could not be destroyed, four craft fled across the universe with them. Noah informs Drago that Qeteb must be reconstituted before he can be destroyed, that Tencendor must be destroyed before it can live again. Drago also learns that the land is highly magical and magic still exists for those who know how to find it. He also is informed that a Sanctuary exists somewhere in the waterways that can hold Tencendor's population when the land is destroyed.

Drago sends the Lake Guard to scout out Sanctuary, Zared's army to Carlon to gather the Acharites, StarDrifter and Zenith to Star Finger to collect the Icarii, and extracts a half-promise from Isfrael for the Avar. As he instructs the leaders, it dawns on them that Caelum is not the StarSon mentioned on the Maze Gate, but Drago is. Isfrael helps the army construct cloth for portable tents so they can venture across the plains and the groups separate.

Zenith still suffers hesitations about her relationship with StarDrifter. While a relationship between grandparent and grandchild is acceptable in Icarii culture, she cannot cope the idea of StarDrifter being her lover. They arrive at the Minaret Peaks to find the magic-reliant Icarii in dire straits, not only from the Demonic Hours, but a lack of food and basic survival skills.

When Caelum and company enter an ancient tunnel to quickly transverse the Fortress Ranges, they fear a trap in the making. Only too soon are they prove right as the Hawkchilds kill the sentries behind them. The demons create an illusion of the hunt dream Caelum suffers from that Axis, Azhure, and Caelum all fall for. They survive to find all the others in the party destroyed and the Alaunt further ahead after running from the horror.

Zared's army travels towards Carlon, but an army composed of animals and men that were maddened has been marshalled by the brown and cream badger. When the animals attack, Zared's army survives only thanks to two mysterious white figures that drive off many of foes. Unnoticed until later, the discontent Askam and four hundred men desert during the night. Unfortunately for them, the badger set up a trap and they are all dragged from under the shade into the demonic miasma to become like the mad animals. Under control of the badger, Askam and his men rejoin Zared's force as they ride. Although no other attack is forthcoming, when the last of the army is entering Carlon, Askam abducts Zared's wife Leagh. When the next Demonic Hour falls, she too is driven insane.

Drago and Faraday travel north to Gorkenfort to meet their "ancestral mother." On the way, Drago expresses his love for Faraday. Although she knows that she loves him, she denies it as she fears that it would mean she would need to be sacrificed again. She also worries about the dreams of a girl calling for help that are trying to draw her to Star Finger. On the path, they find a senile white horse that Drago recognizes as Belaguez, Axis's old warhorse. They also discover that they are immune to the demons' feedings. The demons feel the resistances but cannot identify them. Although later confronted by a Hawkchild speaking for the demons, they do not connect the resistance with Drago. They are confused by him being alive, but are diverted from killing him as the white donkeys (revealed to be extremely powerful magicians and those that previously saved the army) destroy Askam's force and return Leagh to Zerad.

Caelum, Axis, and Azhure are taunted by the Hawkchilds continually as they travel the mountain paths to Star Finger. Eventually, the Hawkchilds stage an attack and nearly destroy who they believe to be the StarSon. The former Star Gods and Alaunt manage to stave off the attack and get the wounded party to Star Finger.

Drago and Faraday arrive at Gorkenfort. Shortly afterward Urbeth the icebear arrives to reveal that she is the being known as the Enchantress and the Mother of Races. Although she mothered the Acharites, the Charonites, and the Icarii, her eldest (the Acharite forerunner) rejected magic and she cast him out of her life. However, both he and the Acharites do have innate magic but it now can only be accessed if they die and are brought back to life. Drago and Faraday leave towards Star Finger but leave Belaguez for Urbeth who then transforms him into the star stallion and sends him south.

Meanwhile, a mourning Zared is convinced to send part of the army and the whole Strike Force to the Murkle Mines where some 20,000 men, women, and child are holed up. When their ships are destroyed in the bay, the remains of the men convince the refugees to head towards Carlon. The demons learn of this progress and set a trap on the path that eventually drives all of the refugees into the madness of Demonic Hours. Only Theod survives and rides to Carlon on the reborn Belaguez to tell the tale.

The demons arrive at the Lake of Life and kill it to access Qeteb's breath, DragonStar now gaining the body of an adolescent and breath. Again, WolfStar follows their example with the Niah-corpse and slips away. After giving StarLaughter a small amount of power, the demons decide to investigate Sigholt. When Rox crosses the bridge, it transforms into a spider-like shape and devours the demon releasing nighttime from terror. The demons and StarLaughter flee towards Fernbrake Lake.

The Lake Guard have figured out the mystery of Sanctuary determining it must be a magical keep. As the other lakes each have a keep, Fernbrake's keep must have sunken to the waterways and show the way to Sanctuary. Some of the Lake Guard, StarDrifter, and Zenith travel to Fernbrake. There they not only discover the way to the keep, but that the Star Dance can be accessed through dance. When StarDrifter attempts to cross the bridge to Sanctuary, it rejects him as he is not 'he who is true.' They depart on the waterways to find Drago.

At Star Finger, Axis, Azhure, Caelum, and the former Star Gods find a mysterious girl in the lower levels holding a book titled Enchanted Songbook. Unfortunately no one can reach her until Drago and Faraday enter the chamber. Caelum, who has now realized that he is only a decoy for the real StarSon, keeps Axis from killing Drago and sends them all from the room. When they are alone, Caelum asks for Drago's forgiveness for their past. More specifically, for Caelum framing Drago for RiverStar's murder. Caelum and RiverStar were secretly lovers and he killed her when she revealed she was pregnant. Drago, Faraday, StarDrifter's party, and the Alaunt depart on the waterways to Sigholt and then Sanctuary. At Sigholt, Drago retrieves the Wolven and the keep's cat population and learns of another way to access the pattern of the Star Dance, through hand movements. They open Sanctuary and begin the evacuation of the Icarii.

Drago, Faraday, and the girl Katie travel to Carlon via Spiredore only to discover it besieged by the animal army and of the loss of the 20,000. With the help of the lizard and Katie, Drago removes the demonic madness from Leagh, in essence returning her from the dead and giving her access to her magic. They leave for the site of the ambush of the 20,000 and gather them together. Drago cures Goldman, Theod's wife Gwendylyr, and DareWing FullHeart of their madness and dispatches the rest so the demons cannot use them anymore.

WolfStar appears at Fernbrake Lake only to be captured by StarDrifter and Isfrael to await trail. When the demons arrive, they free WolfStar only to torment him and hold him captive. They shatter Fernbrake and summon the craft to the surface as StarDrifter, Isfrael, and Goodwife Renkin mourn the death of the Mother. The demons invest both DragonStar and Niah with the movement of Qeteb and leave for Grail Lake and the Maze.

Caelum departs for the hunt and for Drago to summon him. He has learned that the Enchanted Songbook shows dances to access magic and more or less successfully used one to destroy a Hawkchild. As he waits, he visits with Urbeth and her two daughters, the white donkeys turned icebear.

The animal army stages an attack led by the patchy-bald rat and his minions from the sewers that leaves the population of Carlon in panic and the city on fire. With the help of his new magicians, Drago evacuates the remaining Acharites through Spiredore to Sanctuary. He sends the magicians off to the rest of Tencendor to collect the remaining populations which turn out to include animal and insect as well. Faraday confronts Isfrael with his stance that the Avar should keep to themselves by showing a vision of Barsarbe doing the same. The Avar and the rest of Tencendor descend into Sanctuary, but not before the Mother reveals herself to Faraday urging her to let herself love Drago. Mother then retreats to the Sacred Grove and closes the pathways.

Drago enters the Maze and races on Belaguaz to the Dark Tower within. There he opens a gate and travels to Caelum to bring him to Spiredore and the hunt. The demons pass through the maze and fully resurrect Qeteb in the body that was once DragonStar. Malice sweeps across the land, destroying everything not already corrupted save for Caelum, Urbeth, her daughters, and the wooden bowl given to Faraday by the silver-backed Horned One. Qeteb starts the hunt and they eventually corner Caelum who they still believe to be the StarSon. However, rather than cowering in fear and then pain, Caelum dies with a smile on his face as all he sees is a field full of flowers.
