= Hades' Daughter =

Book by Sara Douglass

- Hades' Daughter first edition cover
- Author: Sara Douglass
- Cover artist: David Wyatt
- Language: English
- Series: The Troy Game
- Genre: Fantasy
- Publisher: Voyager Books
- Publication date: December 2002
- Publication place: Australia
- Media type: Print (hardback & paperback)
- Pages: 621 (first edition)
- ISBN: 0-7322-7164-9
- OCLC: 52686527
- Followed by: God’s Concubine

Hades' Daughter is a fantasy novel by Australian writer by Sara Douglass, the first book in the Troy Game series. It is inspired, with some differences, by the legend of Theseus.

== Plot summary ==
Hade's Daughter opens at the Troy Game quartet. It is set in the Late Bronze Age (approx. 1000–1200 BC) during the time of the great Aegean Catastrophe and some years after the fall of Troy. The story's actions are mainly between Naxos, western Greece and the mysterious land of Llangarlia in the Isle of Albion (Britain). Much of the action focuses on Brutus of Troy's banishment, after he accidentally kills his father with an arrow. After wandering among the islands of the Tyrrhenian Sea and through Gaul, where he founds the city of Tours, Brutus eventually comes to the Isle of Albion, Britain, names it after himself, and fills it with his descendants. The main characters are as follows:

- Genvissa, sixth daughter-heir of Ariadne (lover of Theseus), and the MagaLlan of Llangarlia.
- Brutus, leader of the Trojans.
- Membricus, Brutus' former lover and now his adviser.
- Asterion, the murdered Minotaur, half-brother to Ariadne.
- Cornelia, Brutus' wife, and the central character of the first three books of the series.
- Corineus, Brutus' captain.
- Coel, a Llangarlian mystic and warrior; also temporary lover of Cornelia.
- Loth, a strange, enigmatic Llangarlian man with a distorted antler-shaped head.
- Aerne, Gormagog of Llangarlia.
- Mag, Mother Goddess of the Waters of Llangarlia.
- And a host of various supporting characters.

== Critical reception ==
Steven H. Silver wrote on SF Site:

From the very first pages of Sara Douglass's Hades' Daughter, it is clear that Douglass has a tightly packed and plotted series in mind. Epic in proportion, she is tackling nothing less than the course of Western civilization, from the fall of Troy until the Second World War, all set against a rotating cast of eternal heroes and villains and the Byzantine game they play – The Troy Game...Douglass draws her background from Greek mythology, the Iliad and Aeneid, as well as Geoffrey of Monmouth's account in Historia Regum Britanniae of the founding of Britain by Brutus, a descendent of Aeneas. She weaves these disparate mythical backgrounds together well, along with conjecture on the pre-Brutus beliefs indigenous to the British Isles...One of the strengths of Hades' Daughter is Douglass's decision not to present any of her characters as heroes or villains of the piece...Douglass's greatest strength is her ability to create interesting, believable, and well-researched worlds. Her characters are strong and flawed in a way to maintain the reader's interest. Her prose is, at times, plodding, but not to the extent that it stands in the way of either enjoying the story or reading through the hefty length of her works."
