= Mandy (1952 film) =

- Original UK cinema poster
- Directed by: Alexander Mackendrick
- Screenplay by: Nigel Balchin; Jack Whittingham
- Based on: The Day Is Ours by Hilda Lewis
- Produced by: Michael Balcon; Leslie Norman
- Starring: Phyllis Calvert; Jack Hawkins; Terence Morgan; Godfrey Tearle; Mandy Miller
- Cinematography: Douglas Slocombe
- Edited by: Seth Holt
- Music by: William Alwyn
- Color process: Black and white
- Production company: Ealing Studios
- Distributed by: General Film Distributors
- Release date: 29 July 1952 (UK)
- Running time: 93 minutes
- Country: United Kingdom
- Language: English

Mandy is a 1952 British drama film about a family's struggle to give their deaf daughter a better life. It was directed by Alexander Mackendrick and is based on the novel The Day Is Ours by Hilda Lewis. It stars Phyllis Calvert, Jack Hawkins and Terence Morgan, and features the first film appearance by Jane Asher. In the US the film was released as The Story of Mandy, and later was sold to television as Crash of Silence.

A high proportion of the film looks at educational methods for deaf people in the 1950s and focuses on oralism, a now controversial approach which relies on teaching the child to speak and lipread and discourages sign language.

== Plot ==
Christine Garland has a young deaf daughter, Mandy. Her husband Harry is away from home.

As they realise their daughter's situation, the parents enrol Mandy in special education classes to try to get her to speak. They quarrel in the process and their marriage comes under strain. There are also hints of a possible affair between Christine and Dick Searle, the headmaster of the school for the deaf where Mandy is enrolled. Mandy's first speech is achieved by using a balloon. She is able to feel the vibrations of sound onto the balloon and know she had made a sound.

Harry Garland returns to Christine and Mandy and wants Mandy taken out of the school and sent to a private school. Christine strongly resists.

Searle perseveres and eventually, the training succeeds to the point where Mandy says "Mama". Searle's boss Ackland is unhappy about the relationship between Searle and Christine and word of this reaches Searle. Word also reaches Harry Garland who is staying with his parents in a large London townhouse. Harry goes to speak to Ackland. Then he confronts Christine.

He takes Mandy out of the school and takes her to his parents' house. Mandy is sad. The back garden looks onto a bomb-site where children are playing. The children ask her to play and ask her name. With her parents behind she says "Mandy" for the first time.

== Cast ==
- Phyllis Calvert as Christine Garland
- Jack Hawkins as Dick Searle
- Terence Morgan as Harry Garland
- Godfrey Tearle as Mr Garland
- Mandy Miller as Mandy Garland
- Marjorie Fielding as Mrs Garland
- Nancy Price as Jane Ellis
- Edward Chapman as Ackland
- Patricia Plunkett as Miss Crocker
- Eleanor Summerfield as Lily Tabor
- Colin Gordon as Wollard (junior)
- Dorothy Alison as Miss Stockton
- Julian Amyes as Jimmy Tabor
- Gabrielle Brune as Secretary
- John Cazabon as Davey
- Gwen Bacon as Mrs Paul
- W. E. Holloway as Woollard (senior)
- Phyllis Morris as Miss Tucker
- Gabrielle Blunt as Miss Larner
- Jean Shepherd as Mrs Jackson
- Jane Asher (aged six) as Nina
- Marlene Maddox as Leonie

== Production ==
The film's screenplay was written by Nigel Balchin and Jack Whittingham. The film was shot at the Ealing Studios in west London, and also at the Royal Schools for the Deaf outside Manchester.

== Reception ==
=== Box office ===
Mandy premiered in London on 29 July 1952, and was the fifth most popular at the British box office that year.

=== Awards ===
The film was nominated for six BAFTA awards at the 1953 British Academy Film Awards ceremony, but did not win any. Alexander Mackendrick was awarded the Special Jury Prize at the 1952 Venice Film Festival for his direction, and the film was nominated for the Golden Lion at the same festival.

== See also ==
- List of films featuring the deaf and hard of hearing
