= Apollo and Diana =

1628 painting by Gerrit van Honthorst

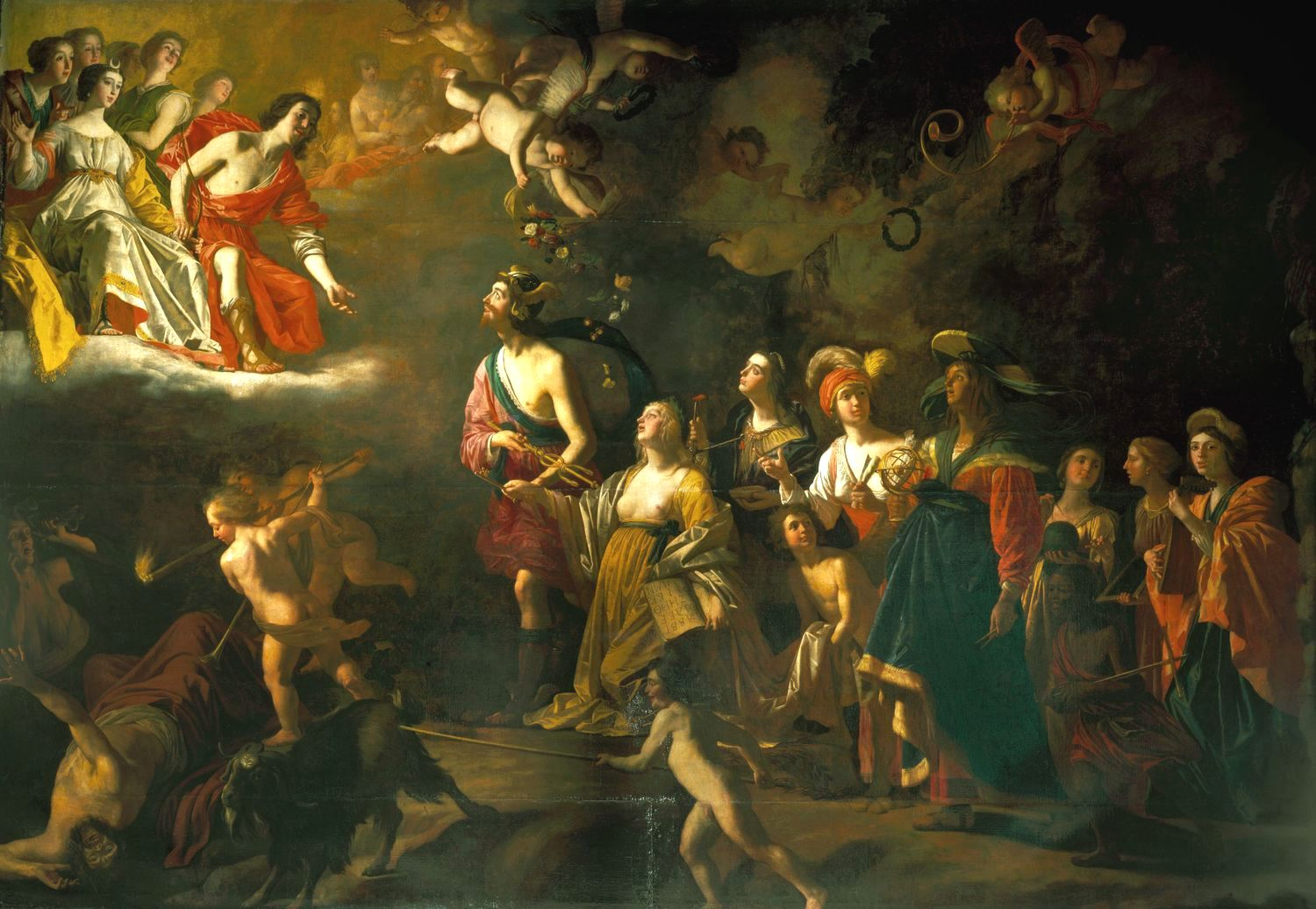
- Artist: Gerard van Honthorst
- Year: 1628
- Medium: Oil on canvas
- Dimensions: 357 cm × 640 cm (141 in × 250 in)
- Location: Hampton Court Palace, Richmond upon Thames, London
- Owner: Royal Collection
- Accession: RCIN 405746

Apollo and Diana or The Liberal Arts presented to King Charles and Henrietta Maria is a 1628 painting by Gerard van Honthorst, now on the Queen's Staircase at Hampton Court Palace as part of the Royal Collection.

The artist spent the last nine months of 1628 in London working for Charles I of England, having previously been commissioned several times by Charles' sister Elizabeth. The work's original location is unknown, but it was commissioned by the Duke of Buckingham in an attempt to compete with Rubens' recent Marie de' Medici cycle, whose creation Buckingham had seen in Paris.

At top left are Charles himself in the guise of Apollo and his wife Henrietta Maria as Apollo's sister Diana, with Buckingham as Mercury in the centre. The work's first mention in the written records places it in storage near Banqueting House.

"The picture's structure is very similar to that of Titian's Ecce Homo, which Von Honthorst could have studied in York House".
