= Venissa =

Fictional daughter of the Roman Emperor Claudius

Venissa (Gwenissa, Genissa, Genvissa, Genuissa), according to Geoffrey of Monmouth's 12th century Historia Regum Britanniae, was a daughter of the Roman Emperor Claudius, whom he gave in marriage to the British king Arvirargus once he had submitted to Rome.

According to Geoffrey's account she was very beautiful, and so enchanted Arvirargus that he preferred her company to anyone else's. He founded Gloucester, supposedly named after Claudius, in her honour. When Arvirargus fell out with Rome and Vespasian was sent to enforce a reconciliation, Venissa acted as mediator between them.

Venissa cannot be considered historical. She is not mentioned in authentic Roman history; her supposed husband Arvirargus is known only from a cryptic reference in a 2nd-century satirical poem by Juvenal; and it is in any case inconceivable that a daughter, even an illegitimate daughter, of a Roman emperor could be given in marriage to a barbarian without attracting comment. Nonetheless, she and her husband, identified with the historical Caratacus, appear in many uncritical genealogies originating in the Tudor period.
