= Crusader (Douglass novel) =

1999 novel by Sara Douglass

- Crusader first edition cover.
- Author: Sara Douglass
- Language: English
- Series: The Wayfarer Redemption
- Genre: Fantasy
- Publisher: HarperCollins
- Publication date: 1999
- Publication place: Australia
- Media type: Print (Paperback & Hardback)
- Pages: 584 (first edition)
- ISBN: 0-7322-6529-0
- OCLC: 154318041
- Preceded by: Pilgrim

Crusader is the 1999 fantasy novel by Australian author, Sara Douglass. It was first published in Australia as the conclusion of The Wayfarer Redemption trilogy, and then published in the United States and Europe as the finale of the Wayfarer Redemption sextet. It is preceded by Pilgrim.

== Plot summary ==
Raging at the escape of the StarSon, Qeteb has the Hawkchilds scour the remains of Tencendor. Although they don't immediately find Sanctuary, a Hawkchild does find and return the wooden bowl given to Faraday by the Mother, though they do not know how to use it. Unaware of this oversight, the Mother, Ur, and the Horned Ones wait in the Sacred Groves, slowly dying. Meanwhile, at sanctuary many are discontented and impatient, finding it more of a prison then a sanctuary. Axis walks to the bridge and begins talking to it, though halfway through it begins screaming and it dies, and Axis nearly falls into the chasm below until Drago saves him, and though Axis notices some sort of power in him, he still stubbornly refuses to forgive him for Caelum's death, thinking he is still the malevolent man he was when he was a baby, who always wanted Caelum's inheritance. Drago then talks to Azhure, who also recognises he has some sort of power, and on departure recognises him as Dragonstar, not Drago.

== Critical reception ==
A reviewer on the Kara Reviews website had some problems with the novel: "In many ways, Crusader is like one of the Avengers movies. There are a lot of people with powers wandering around, stepping on each other's toes, and internecine disputes abound. Everyone is out for the most screen time they can wrangle from the screenwriter, not realizing the director's final cut is going to change everything...This is a flawed ending to a flawed series. With a few exceptions, I felt like each subsequent book brought me diminishing returns. Douglass is an author full of big ideas, but her eagerness to include every big idea in one story results in a cluttered playground with too many characters, too many grudges, too many stories for one book to contain coherently. Crusader isn't bad, but it also isn't good."

== Awards ==
- Aurealis Award for Best Fantasy Novel, 2000, shortlisted
