= Sara Douglass =

Australian writer

- Born: Sara Warneke; 2 July 1957; Penola, South Australia, Australia
- Died: 27 September 2011 (aged 54); Hobart, Tasmania, Australia
- Writing career
- Pen name: Sara Douglass
- Period: 1995–2011
- Genre: Fantasy
- Notable awards: Aurealis Award; Fantasy division 1996 Enchanter & StarMan; 2001 The Wounded Hawk
- Website: www.saradouglassworlds.com

Sara Warneke (2 July 1957 – 27 September 2011), better known by her pen name Sara Douglass, was an Australian fantasy writer who lived in Hobart, Tasmania. She was a recipient of the Aurealis Award for best fantasy novel.

== Biography ==
A great-granddaughter of psychic Robert James Lees, Douglass was born in Penola, South Australia. She attended Annesley College, in Wayville, a suburb of Adelaide. She studied for her BA while working as a registered nurse, and later completed her PhD in early modern English History. She became a lecturer in medieval history at La Trobe University, Bendigo. While there she completed her first novel, BattleAxe, which launched her as a popular fantasy author in Australia, and later as an international success.

Until the mid-2000s, Douglass hosted a bulletin board on her website, with the aim of encouraging creative thinking and constructive criticism of others' work. She maintained an online blog about the restoration project of her house and garden entitled Notes from Nonsuch in Tasmania.

In 2008, Douglass was diagnosed with ovarian cancer. She underwent treatment; however, in late 2010 the cancer returned. She died on 27 September 2011, aged 54.

== Works ==
=== Fantasy fiction ===
Douglass mainly focused her efforts on fantasy writings. Her first trilogy, The Axis Trilogy, is set in the fantasy world of Tencendor. Of The Axis Trilogy, Enchanter and StarMan won the 1996 Aurealis Fantasy division award and Battleaxe was nominated for the 1995 award. Douglass's second series, The Wayfarer Redemption, two stand alone novels and her most recent series, Darkglass Mountain also focus on the fantasy world used in The Axis Trilogy. The Wayfarer Redemption also did well in the Aurealis Fantasy division with all three novels reaching the finals for their published years.

In addition to the fantasy novels set in the world of Tencendor and Escator, Douglass wrote two unrelated historical fantasy series, The Crucible trilogy and The Troy Game. Some of these novels also reached the Aurealis Fantasy division finals with The Nameless Day and The Crippled Angel from The Crucible finishing as finalists and The Wounded Hawk winning the award in 2001. Hades' Daughter and Darkwitch Rising from The Troy Game also were finalists in the Fantasy division.

=== Other works ===
Douglass also wrote a non-fiction book, The Betrayal of Arthur, and several short stories.

== Bibliography ==
Note: In the US, and most European countries, The Axis Trilogy and The Wayfarer Redemption have been combined into one six-book series, Wayfarer Redemption.

=== The Axis Trilogy ===
In the United States, these novels were published as the first three books of the Wayfarer Redemption series.

- Battleaxe (1995) (published as The Wayfarer Redemption in the United States)
- Enchanter (1996)
- StarMan (1996)

=== The Wayfarer Redemption ===
- Sinner (1997)
- Pilgrim (1998)
- Crusader (1999)

=== The Crucible ===
- The Nameless Day (2000)
- The Wounded Hawk (2001)
- The Crippled Angel (2002)

=== The Troy Game ===
- Hades' Daughter (2002)
- Gods' Concubine (2004)
- Darkwitch Rising (2005)
- Druid's Sword (2006)

=== Darkglass Mountain ===
- The Serpent Bride (2007)
- The Twisted Citadel (2008)
- The Infinity Gate (2010)

Prequels to 'Darkglass Mountain' trilogy

- Beyond the Hanging Wall (1996) - set just prior to the events in the trilogy.
- Threshold (1997) - set approximately 2,000 years before the events in the trilogy.

Note: The Darkglass Mountain series, is a sequel to the Axis Trilogy and the Wayfarer Redemption.

=== Other ===
- The Devil's Diadem (2011)
- The Hall of Lost Footsteps (a collection of stories, Ticonderoga Publications, due 2011)

=== Short stories ===
- "Of Fingers and Foreskins" (1996) in Eidolon #21 and The Best of Australian Science Fiction and Fantasy 1996 (ed. Jonathan Strahan and Jeremy Byrne)
- "The Evil Within" (1998) in Dreaming Down-Under (ed. Janeen Webb and Jack Dann) and The Year's Best Fantasy and Horror (ed. Ellen Datlow and Terri Windling)
- "The Field of Thorns" (2000) in Australian Women's Weekly
- "St Uncumber" (2001) in Australian Women's Weekly
- "The Mistress of Marwood Hagg" (2003) in Gathering the Bones (ed. Dennis Etchison, Ramsey Campbell & Jack Dann)
- "This Way to the Exit" (2008) in Dreaming Again (ed. Jack Dann)

=== Non-fiction ===
- Images of the Educational Traveller in Early Modern England (E. J. Brill, 1995)
- The Betrayal of Arthur (1998)

== Awards and nominations ==
=== Aurealis Awards ===
Fantasy division

- Finalist: Battleaxe (1995)
- Won: Enchanter and Starman (1996) tie with Jack Dann's The Memory Cathedral
- Finalist: Sinner (1997)
- Finalist: Pilgrim (1998)
- Finalist: Crusader (1999)
- Finalist: The Nameless Day (2000)
- Won: The Wounded Hawk (2001)
- Finalist: The Crippled Angel (2002)
- Finalist: Hades' Daughter (2002)
- Finalist: Darkwitch Rising (2005)

=== Australian Shadows Award ===
- Finalist: "This Way to the Exit" (Dreaming Again, ed. Jack Dann, HarperVoyager 2008)
