= The Gentle Falcon =

1952 novel by Hilda Lewis

- First edition
- Author: Hilda Lewis
- Illustrator: Evelyn Gibbs
- Language: English
- Genre: Historical fiction
- Publication date: 1952
- Publication place: United Kingdom
- Media type: Print
- Pages: 250

The Gentle Falcon is a historical novel for young readers by Hilda Lewis, based on the story of King Richard II and his child bride, Isabella, written in first person from the point of view of a close companion of the Queen. It was published by Oxford University Press in 1952 and adapted as a television series by the BBC in 1954. In 1957 the first American edition was published by Criterion Books.

Hilda Lewis, a prolific writer of adult historical fiction, also wrote two other historical novels for young adult readers, Harold Was My King (about Harold Godwinson) and Here Comes Harry (set in 15th century London).

== Plot summary ==
Isabella Clinton is the daughter and only child of a French noblewoman, from the House of Valois, and an English soldier. With her father dead, she is heir to his estate but prefers working in the fields to learning to be a proper noblewoman. This is made clear from her sharp tongue and blunt way of speaking.

After the death of her father, it seems that the Black Prince has forgotten Isabella and her mother. It is quite a long time before Isabella is finally summoned to court by King Richard – and when she finally is, it is to be companion to her young kinswoman, Isabella of the House of Valois, Madame of France and soon to be Queen of England.

We see the love that Queen Isabella develops for King Richard through her companion's eyes. Although the queen is a mature seven-year-old at her first appearance, what happens to her throughout the story causes her great sorrow (even though she does not show it on the outside).

== Reception ==
In a star review, Kirkus Reviews described The Gentle Falcon as a "sparkling, poignant fictionalized biography" and "princely reading fare." while the Wisconsin library bulletin reprinted a review by the Bulletin of the Children's Book Center that called it "An intriguing story..."

== Television adaptation ==
The British Broadcasting Corporation produced a seven-episode television series based on The Gentle Falcon, which was broadcast from 15 June 1954. Glen Alyn played the adult Isabella, while Victoria Nolan played her as a girl.

== Sources ==
- The Gentle Falcon, by Hilda Lewis
