= The Crucible (trilogy) =

Novel series by Sara Douglass

- First edition covers.
- The Nameless Day; The Wounded Hawk; The Crippled Angel
- Author: Sara Douglass
- Country: Australia
- Language: English
- Genre: Fantasy
- Publisher: Voyager Books
- Published: 2000–2002
- Media type: Print (hardback & paperback)

The Crucible is a series of three historical fantasy novels written by Australian author Sara Douglass. The series is set around the adventures of English friar and nobleman Thomas Neville – who finds himself caught up between the eternal struggle of the angels of Heaven and the demons of Hell, all against the backdrop of England and Europe in the throes of the profound crisis of the Late Middle Ages.

== Books ==
The trilogy comprises the following titles:

- The Nameless Day (2000)
- The Wounded Hawk (2001)
- The Crippled Angel (2002)
