= Hilda Lewis =

British writer

- Born: Hilda Winfred Maizels; 1896; Whitechapel, London, England
- Died: 1974 (aged 77-78)
- Occupation: Novelist
- Known for: historical, children's fiction, horror

Hilda Winifred Lewis (nee Maizels, 1896–1974) was a British writer of historical and children's fiction.

== Biography ==
She was born Hilda Winifred Maizels in Whitechapel, London in 1896. Her father, Joseph Maizels, was a Jewish jeweller and silversmith who had immigrated to England from Kalisz, Poland; he married her mother, Deborah Lipman, in London in 1893.

Lewis originally worked as a teacher, but started writing when she moved to Nottingham in the 1920s.

Most of her works were historical novels, some of which, such as I Am Mary Tudor (1972), received critical attention. Her young adult historical novel The Gentle Falcon, was adapted for television.

She also wrote a noted children's book, The Ship that Flew (1939) which concerns Norse mythology and time travel.

The 1946 novel The Day is Ours about a young deaf girl was the basis of the film Mandy. The novel in turn was inspired by the work of her husband Professor M. Michael Lewis who was a specialist in the education of the deaf at the University of Nottingham.

Most of Lewis's works are out of print; however, a number are available either in print or as e-books. The Ship that Flew was republished in the Oxford Children's Modern Classics series in 1998. Four of her young adult novels, Harold Was My King, Here Comes Harry, The Ship That Flew and The Gentle Falcon are available as ebooks from Beebliome Books. Wife to Charles II and I, Jacqueline are available in The Book People's historical fiction paperback collection. The Witch and the Priest (1956), a horror novel about the seventeenth century Lincolnshire witch trials was republished in Dennis Wheatley's paperback Library of the Occult. A number of works are being made available by The History Press. In 2013, Valancourt Books reissued The Witch and the Priest with an introduction by Alison Weir. Bromley House Library published a reprint of Penny Lace in 2011.

== Selected works ==
- The Ship that Flew (1939)
- Penny Lace (1942), reprint 2011
- The Day Is Ours (1946) – Formed the basis of the screenplay of the 1952 film Mandy.
- The Gentle Falcon (1952)
- The Witch and the Priest (1956)
- I, Jacqueline (1957)
- Wife to Great Buckingham (1959)
- Here Comes Harry (1960)
- Wife to Charles II (1965)
- Wife to the Bastard (1966)
- Harold Was My King (1968), about the struggle between Harold Godwinson, William the Conqueror and Edgar the Atheling for the English throne.
- Harlot Queen (1970), about Isabella of France
- I Am Mary Tudor (1972)
- Rose of England (1977 – published posthumously)
- Heart of a Rose (1978 – published posthumously)
