= The Memory Cathedral =

1995 novel by Jack Dann

- The Memory Cathedral first edition cover.
- Author: Jack Dann
- Cover artist: Tim Jacobus
- Language: English
- Genre: Fantasy, historical
- Publisher: Bantam Books
- Publication date: December 1995
- Publication place: Australia
- Media type: Print (hardback & paperback)
- Pages: 485 pp (first edition)
- ISBN: 978-0-553-09637-8

The Memory Cathedral: A Secret History of Leonardo da Vinci is a 1995 historical fantasy fiction novel by Jack Dann. It follows Leonardo da Vinci constructing his flying machine and then travelling to the East.

== Background ==
The Memory Cathedral was first published by Bantam Books in December 1995, and has been published in ten languages to date.

It won the Australian Aurealis Award for best fantasy novel in 1997, and was #1 on The Age bestseller list. In 1996, a novella based on the novel, Da Vinci Rising, was awarded the Nebula Award for Best Novella. The Memory Cathedral was shortlisted for Audio Book of the Year, which was part of the 1998 Braille & Talking Book Library Awards, and was nominated for the 1997 Ditmar Award for Best Australian Long Fiction.

== Synopsis ==
Dann's major historical novel depicts a version of the Renaissance in which Leonardo da Vinci actually constructs a number of his inventions, such as a flying machine, whose designs are well-known from his surviving sketches. He later employs some of his military inventions during a battle in the Middle East, while in the service of a Syrian general – events which Dann projects into a year of Leonardo's life about which little is known. The novel also presents a detailed imagining of the life and character of the inventor and painter during this period, and describes his encounters with other historical characters residing in Florence, including Machiavelli and Botticelli.

The title refers to an ancient system of memory recall, known as the Method of loci, in which a building, such as a cathedral, is constructed in the mind as a container for imagined objects which are deliberately connected to particular memories. The building can later be mentally navigated to re-encounter those objects and retrieve the memories with which they are associated. Leonardo's memory cathedral functions in the narrative as a device through which he reviews his experiences as death approaches.
