= 2003 in Australian literature =

This article presents a list of the historical events and publications of Australian literature during 2003.

== Events ==
- Peter Carey and Joan London join the list of authors who have withdrawn from contention for the Tasmania Pacific Region Prize. In 2002 Richard Flanagan and Tim Winton also declined to have their books nominated for the prize in protest at the involvement of Forestry Tasmania as a sponsor of the Ten Days on the Island festival at which the award winner is to be announced.
- Members of The Australian Society of Authors (ASA) voted in their Society's 40th anniversary poll to select Australia's favourite book. Tim Winton's Cloudstreet headed the poll followed by The Man Who Loved Children by Christina Stead and The Fortunes of Richard Mahony by Henry Handel Richardson.
- Nevil Shute's 1950 novel, A Town Like Alice was included in a BBC-sponsored UK survey of 100 popular novels, but has failed to make a similar Australian list.

== Major publications ==
=== Literary fiction ===
- Alan Atwood – Burke's Soldier
- Peter Carey – My Life as a Fake
- Brian Castro – Shanghai Dancing
- J. M. Coetzee – Elizabeth Costello
- Julian Davies – The Boy
- Nikki Gemmell – The Bride Stripped Bare
- Peter Goldsworthy – Three Dog Night
- Shirley Hazzard – The Great Fire
- Kathryn Heyman – The Accomplice
- Janette Turner Hospital – Due Preparations for the Plague
- M. J. Hyland – How the Light Gets In
- Annamarie Jagose – Slow Water
- Nada A. Jarrar – Somewhere, Home
- Tom Keneally – The Tyrant's Novel
- Kathy Lette – Dead Sexy
- Colleen McCullough – The Touch
- Nerida Newton – The Lambing Flat
- Elliot Perlman – Seven Types of Ambiguity
- D. B. C. Pierre – Vernon God Little
- Patricia Shaw – The Five Winds
- Sue Woolfe – The Secret Cure

=== Children's and Young Adult fiction ===
- Pamela Allen – Cuthbert's Babies
- Paul Collins – The Earthborn
- Kate Constable – The Waterless Sea
- Marianne Curley – The Dark
- Justin D'Ath – Shaedow Master
- Garry Disher – Eva's Angel
- John Heffernan – GBH
- Melina Marchetta – Saving Francesca
- David Metzenthen – Boys of Blood & Bone
- Jaclyn Moriarty – Finding Cassie Crazy
- Martine Murray – How to Make a Bird
- Garth Nix
  - Abhorsen
  - Mister Monday
- Emily Rodda – Rowan of the Bukshah
- Janeen Webb – The Silken Road to Samarkand

=== Crime ===
- Kirsty Brooks – The Vodka Dialogue
- Ian Callinan – Appointment at Amalfi
- Lindy Cameron – Thicker Than Water
- Jon Cleary – Degrees of Connection
- Peter Corris – Master's Mates
- Michelle de Kretser – The Hamilton Case
- Garry Disher – Kittyhawk Down
- Kerry Greenwood – The Castlemaine Murders: A Phryne Fisher Mystery
- Wayne Grogan – Junkie Pilgrim
- Gabrielle Lord – Lethal Factor
- Barry Maitland – The Verge Practice
- Matthew Reilly – Scarecrow
- Gregory David Roberts – Shantaram
- Michael Robotham – The Suspect
- Steve J. Spears – Murder at the Fortnight
- Peter Temple – White Dog
- Lee Tulloch – The Cutting: A Nullin Mystery
- Robin Wallace-Crabbe – The Forger

=== Romance ===
- Ally Blake – The Wedding Wish
- Lucy Clark – Englishman at Dingo Creek
- Barbara Hannay – A Wedding at Windaroo
- Stephanie Laurens – A Gentleman's Honor
- Di Morrissey – Barra Creek
- Candice R. Proctor – Beyond Sunrise
- Meredith Webber – Outback Encounter

=== Science Fiction and Fantasy ===
- Max Barry – Jennifer Government
- K. A. Bedford – Orbital Burn
- K. J. Bishop – The Etched City
- Russell Blackford – An Evil Hour
- Trudi Canavan – The High Lord
- Bill Congreve – Southern Blood: New Australian Tales of the Supernatural
- Marianne Curley – The Dark
- Cecilia Dart-Thornton – The Battle of Evernight
- Sara Douglass – God's Concubine
- Jennifer Fallon
  - Eye of the Labyrinth
  - Lord of the Shadows
- Lian Hearn – Grass for His Pillow
- Ian Irvine – Terminator Gene
- Victor Kelleher – Born of the Sea
- Glenda Larke – The Aware
- Fiona McIntosh – Myrren's Gift
- Anthony O'Neill – The Lamplighter
- Kate Orman – Blue Box
- Tony Shillitoe – Freedom
- Kim Wilkins – The Autumn Castle
- Sean Williams and Shane Dix – Heirs of Earth

=== Drama ===
- Mireille Juchau – White Gifts
- Hannie Rayson – Inheritance
- Henri Szeps – One Life, Two Journeys
- David Williamson – Birthrights

=== Poetry ===
- Judith Beveridge – Wolf Notes
- Laurie Duggan – Mangroves
- Stephen Edgar – Lost in the Foreground
- Brook Emery — Misplaced Heart
- Clive James – The Book of My Enemy : Collected Verse, 1958–2003
- John Kinsella – Peripheral Light

=== Non-fiction ===
- Fiona Capp – That Oceanic Feeling
- Inga Clendinnen – Dancing with Strangers
- Patricia Crawford and Ian Crawford – Contested Country: A History of the Northcliffe Area
- David Hollinsworth – They Took the Children
- Stuart Macintyre and Anna Clark – The History Wars
- David Marr & Marian Wilkinson – Dark Victory
- Peter Robb – A Death in Brazil

=== Biographies ===
- Graeme Blundell – King: The Life and Comedy of Graham Kennedy
- Lorraine Day – Gordon of Dingley Dell: The Life of Adam Lindsay Gordon (1833–1870): Poet and Horseman
- Edward Duyker – Citizen Labillardiere: A Naturalist's Life in Revolution and Exploration (1755–1834)
- Greg Growden – The Snowy Baker Story
- Tom Keneally – Abraham Lincoln
- Jonathan King – Gallipoli: Our Last Man Standing: The Extraordinary Life of Alec Campbell
- Garry Linnell – Playing God: The Rise and Fall of Gary Ablett
- Peter Singer – Pushing Time Away: My Grandfather and the Tragedy of Jewish Vienna
- Nicholas Thomas – Discoveries: The Voyages of Captain Cook
- Anne Whitehead – Bluestocking in Patagonia

== Awards and honours ==
Note: these awards were presented in the year in question.

=== Lifetime achievement ===
Award	Author
Christopher Brennan Award	Philip Salom
Patrick White Award	Janette Turner Hospital

=== Literary ===
Award	Author	Title	Publisher
The Age Book of the Year Award	Sonya Hartnett	Of a Boy	Viking
ALS Gold Medal	Kate Jennings	Moral Hazard	Picador
Colin Roderick Award	Tom Keneally	The Tyrant's Novel	Doubleday
Nita Kibble Literary Award	Gail Jones	Black Mirror	Picador

=== Fiction ===
==== International ====
Award	Category	Author	Title	Publisher
Commonwealth Writers' Prize	Best Novel, SE Asia and South Pacific region	Sonya Hartnett	Of a Boy	Viking Books

==== National ====
Award	Author	Title	Publisher
Adelaide Festival Awards for Literature	Not awarded		
The Age Book of the Year Award	Sonya Hartnett	Of a Boy	Viking Books
The Australian/Vogel Literary Award	Nicholas Angel	Drown Them in the Sea	Allen and Unwin
The Australian/Vogel Literary Award	Ruth Balint	Troubled Waters	Allen and Unwin
Miles Franklin Award	Alex Miller	Journey to the Stone Country	Allen & Unwin
New South Wales Premier's Literary Awards	Kate Jennings	Moral Hazard	Fourth Estate
Queensland Premier's Literary Awards	Janette Turner Hospital	Due Preparations for the Plague	HarperCollins
Victorian Premier's Literary Award	Brian Castro	Shanghai Dancing	Giramondo Publishing
Western Australian Premier's Book Awards	Brett D'Arcy	The Mindless Ferocity of Sharks	Vintage Books

=== Children and Young Adult ===
==== National ====
Award	Category	Author	Title	Publisher
Children's Book of the Year Award	Older Readers	Markus Zusak	The Messenger	Macmillan Publishers
Children's Book of the Year Award	Younger Readers	Catherine Bateson	Rain May and Captain Daniel	University of Queensland Press
Children's Book of the Year Award	Picture Book	Norman Jorgensen, illus. Brian Harrison-Lever	In Flanders Fields	Fremantle Arts Centre Press
Children's Book of the Year Award	Early Childhood	Penny Matthews, illus. Andrew McLean	A Year on Our Farm	Omnibus Books
New South Wales Premier's Literary Awards	Children's	Simon French	Where in the World	Little Hare Books
New South Wales Premier's Literary Awards	Young People's	Markus Zusak	The Messenger	Macmillan Publishers
Queensland Premier's Literary Awards	Children's	Catherine Bateson	Rain May and Captain Daniel	University of Queensland Press
Queensland Premier's Literary Awards	Young Adult	David Metzenthen	Boys of Blood and Bone	Penguin Books
Victorian Premier's Literary Award	Young Adult Fiction	Margo Lanagan	Black Juice	Allen & Unwin
Western Australian Premier's Book Awards	Writing for Young Adults	Colin Bowles	Nights in the Sun	Penguin Books
Western Australian Premier's Book Awards	Children's	Mark Greenwood	The Legend of Lasseter's Reef	Cygnet Books

=== Crime and Mystery ===
==== National ====
Award	Category	Author	Title	Publisher
Davitt Award	Novel	Gabrielle Lord	Baby Did a Bad Bad Thing	Hodder Headline Australia
Davitt Award	Novel	Alex Palmer	Blood Redemption	HarperCollins
Davitt Award	Readers' Choice	Cathy Cole	Skin Deep	Duffy and Snellgrove
Davitt Award	Young Adult Novel	Natalie Jane Prior	Fireworks and Darkness	Angus & Robertson
Ned Kelly Award	Novel	Peter Temple	White Dog	Text Publishing
Ned Kelly Award	First novel	Alex Palmer	Blood Redemption	HarperCollins
Ned Kelly Award	True crime	Peter Lalor	Blood Stain	Allen & Unwin
Ned Kelly Award	Lifetime Achievement	Kerry Greenwood		

=== Science fiction ===
Award	Category	Author	Title	Publisher
Aurealis Award	Sf Novel	Jonathan Blum and Kate Orman	Fallen Gods	Telos Publishing
Aurealis Award	Sf Short Story	Brendan Duffy	"Louder Echo"	Agog! Terrific Tales
Aurealis Award	Fantasy Novel	Garth Nix	Abhorsen	Allen and Unwin
Aurealis Award	Fantasy Short Story	Lucy Sussex	"La Sentinelle"	Southern Blood: New Australian Tales of the Supernatural
Aurealis Award	Horror Novel	Victor Kelleher	Born of the Sea	Viking Books
Aurealis Award	Horror Short Story	Simon Brown	"Love is a Stone"	Gathering the Bones
Aurealis Award	Young Adult Novel	Garth Nix	Abhorsen	Allen and Unwin
Aurealis Award	Young Adult Novel	Carole Wilkinson	Dragonkeeper	Black Dog Books
Ditmar Award	Novel	Sean Williams and Shane Dix	Echoes of Earth	HarperCollins
Ditmar Award	Short Fiction	Deborah Biancotti	"King of All and The Metal Sentinel"	Agog! Fantastic Fiction
Ditmar Award	Collected Work	Cat Sparks ed.	Agog! Fantastic Fiction	Agog! Press

=== Poetry ===
Award	Author	Title	Publisher
Adelaide Festival Awards for Literature	Not awarded		
The Age Book of the Year	Laurie Duggan	Mangroves	University of Queensland Press
Anne Elder Award	Chris Andrews	Cut Lunch	Indigo
Anne Elder Award	Kathryn Lomer	Extraction of Arrows	University of Queensland Press
Grace Leven Prize for Poetry	Stephen Edgar	Lost in the Foreground	Duffy & Snellgrove
Mary Gilmore Prize	Not awarded		
New South Wales Premier's Literary Awards	Jill Jones	Screens Jets Heaven: New and Selected Poems	Salt Publishing
Victorian Premier's Literary Award	Emma Lew	Anything the Landlord Touches	Giramondo Publishing
Western Australian Premier's Book Awards	John Kinsella	Peripheral Light	Fremantle Arts Centre Press

=== Drama ===
Award	Author	Title	Publisher
Patrick White Playwrights' Award	David Milroy and Ningali Lawford	Windmill Baby	Currency Press

=== Non-Fiction ===
Award	Category	Author	Title	Publisher
Adelaide Festival Awards for Literature	Non-Fiction	Not awarded		
The Age Book of the Year	Non-Fiction	Ann Galbally	Charles Condor: The Last Bohemian	Miegunyah Press
National Biography Award	Biography	Peter Rose	Rose Boys	Allen & Unwin
National Biography Award	Biography	Don Watson	Recollections of a Bleeding Heart : a Portrait of Paul Keating PM	Random House
New South Wales Premier's Literary Awards	Non-Fiction	Mark McKenna	Looking for Blackfellas' Point: An Australian History of Place	University of New South Wales Press
New South Wales Premier's History Awards	Australian History	James Bowen and Margarita Bowen	The Great Barrier Reef: History, Science, Heritage	Cambridge University Press
New South Wales Premier's History Awards	Community and Regional History	Erik Eklund	Steel Town: The Making and Breaking of Port Kembla	Melbourne University Press
New South Wales Premier's History Awards	General History	David Garrioch	The Making of Revolutionary Paris	University of California Press
New South Wales Premier's History Awards	Young People's	Alan Tucker	My Story: The Bombing of Darwin, The Diary of Tom Taylor	Scholastic Press
Queensland Premier's Literary Awards	Non-fiction	Margaret Simons	Meeting of the Waters	Hachette Australia
Queensland Premier's Literary Awards	History	Richard Bosworth	Mussolini	Oxford University Press
Victorian Premier's Literary Award	Non-fiction	Barry Hill	Broken Song: T.G.H. Strehlow and Aboriginal Possession	Knopf

== Deaths ==
- 16 March – Susan McGowan, poet (born 1907 in Edinburgh, Scotland)
- 18 March – Julie Lewis, short story writer (born 1925)
- 30 March – Nick Enright, playwright and screenwriter (born 1950)
- 2 April – Joan Phipson, writer for children and young adults (born 1912)
- 20 April – Bill Wannan, editor (born 1915)
- 1 May – Stephen Estaban Kelen, dramatist (born 1912 in Budapest, Hungary)
- 28 June – Clem Christesen, poet and founding editor of Meanjin (born 1911)
- 30 June – Oriel Gray, playwright and screenwriter (born 1920)
- 23 November – Hesba Brinsmead, writer for children (born 1922)

== See also ==
- 2003 in Australia
- 2003 in literature
- 2003 in poetry
- List of years in literature
- List of years in Australian literature
