= The Hythrun Chronicles =

Fantasy novels by Jennifer Fallon

The Hythrun Chronicles is a fantasy set of novels by Australian writer Jennifer Fallon, told in two trilogies, The Demon Child Trilogy and The Wolfblade Trilogy. The Demon Child Trilogy follows R'shiel Tenragan as she accepts her fate as the demon child and tries to hold the fabric of her world together while defeating the Karien god, Xaphista, and bringing about some much-needed changes to the four main countries of Medalon, Hythria, Fardohnya and Karien with help from multiple influential characters she befriends. The Wolfblade Trilogy, set about 30 years before, follows the life of Marla Wolfblade from the age of 15 until she is in her 40s. It also follows stories of various characters intertwined with that of Marla Wolfblade and explains much of the history in The Demon Child History as it follows Damin Wolfblade and Marla's other children growing up and how the state of affairs presented in The Demon Child Trilogy came to be. There is a fifth country introduced to the trilogy as well, Denika. It is off the map and indicated as south of Hythria and Fardohnya across the Dregian Ocean, accessed by ship.

== The Demon Child Trilogy ==
- Medalon (2000)
- Treason Keep (2001)
- Harshini (2001)

== The Wolfblade Trilogy ==
- Wolfblade (2004)
- Warrior (2004)
- Warlord (2005)
