= The Bride Stripped Bare =

The Bride Stripped Bare may refer to:

- The Bride Stripped Bare by Her Bachelors, Even (La mariée mise à nu par ses célibataires, même), most often called The Large Glass, an artwork by Marcel Duchamp
- The Bride Stripped Bare (album), a 1978 album by Bryan Ferry
- The Bride Stripped Bare (novel), a 2003 novel written by the Australian writer Nikki Gemmell, originally published anonymously
- "The Bride Stripped Bare," a track on the 1969 Bonzo Dog Band album Keynsham
- "The Bride Stripped Bare," a track on the 2007 Shriekback album Glory Bumps
