= Mangrove (disambiguation) =

A mangrove is a shrub or tree that grows in coastal saline or brackish water.

Mangrove may also refer to:

- USLHT Mangrove, lighthouse tender ship
- The Mangrove, former Caribbean restaurant in Notting Hill, west London
- Mangrove (film), 2020 historical drama film directed by Steve McQueen
- Multitree, a data structure sometimes referred to as a mangrove
- Mangroves (poetry collection), a collection of poetry by Laurie Duggan
- Mangrove fish, a species of fish
