= Oyster (novel) =

1996 novel by Janette Turner Hospital

- Author: Janette Turner Hospital
- Language: English
- Genre: Novel
- Publisher: Sydney: Knopf
- Publication date: 1996
- Publication place: Australia
- Media type: Print (Hardback & Paperback)
- Pages: 453 pp

Oyster is a novel from 1996 by Janette Turner Hospital.

== Plot introduction ==
In Outer Maroo, a fictional town in the outback which doesn't appear on maps, outsiders disappear and there is a queerly pungent smell, the Old Fuckatoo...

== Plot summary ==
In a town highly suspicious of the government and of outsiders in general, the arrival of a man they see as charismatic from the desert—Oyster—occasions an intensification of the town's insularity and lack of free speech. The interactions between conservative forms of Christianity and anti-government landowners is influenced by the presence of Oyster and the cult community he establishes, a community closely integrated into the capitalism of the area's illegal opal trafficking.

The fragmented structure of the novel, in which various moments in the past are interspersed with events in the present, generates heightened suspense and tension as its several sub-plots come together in the apocalyptic destruction of the town and the cult. The paranoia and violence with which the town polices its "lost" status are repeatedly delineated, until events come to a head and the vicious forms of control begin to unravel.

Women are crucial to the destabilisation and destruction of the menace represented above all by powerful men. The discourse of proud outsiderness on the part of these men is highlighted as being hypocritical and self-serving, while the real outsiders are revealed to be mostly women, and men who do not wield social power.

== Characters ==
- Ma Beresford
- Bill Beresford, Ma's husband.
- Charles Given, a former preacher.
- Vivian Given, Charles Given's wife.
- Mercy Given, a sixteen-year-old girl who works at the local post-office after school. She is a member of the Living Word church and as such is not allowed to watch television or listen to the radio, though she craves for it. When younger, she would spend her days reading the Bible.
- Brian Given, Mercy's brother. He is a favourite of Oyster's, who uses him for sexual pleasure.
- Oyster, a stranger at first, he soon becomes the local guru. He is bisexual.
- Susannah Rover, the local schoolteacher, who is killed after provoking the town-dwellers.
- Jake Digby, a man who drives strangers to Outer Maroo.
- Andrew Godwin, he is unfaithful to his wife.
- Dorothy Godwin, Andrew's wife. She is a kleptomaniac. She went to an elite boarding-school in Brisbane as her family were rich wool sellers. She disparages opal mining as 'grubby' work.
- Alice Godwin, the Godwins's daughter. She later lives with Junior and Delia.
- Junior Godwin, the Godwins' son. He grows up to be a cattle herder, and Andrew calls him a 'Communist' for questioning the status quo
- Delia, Junior's wife.
- Ross Godwin, Andrew Godwin's middle son who shot himself because he was in love with Josie O'Leary.
- Josie O'Leary, Andrew Godwin's stockman's teenage daughter, whom he has sex with.
- Mr Prophet, whose real name is Dukke vanKerk. He is from South Africa and lives 100 miles away from Outer Maroo.
- Beverley Prophet, Mr Prophet's daughter.
- Ethel, a Murri girl. She lives with the Godwins and Andrew has sex with her.
- Major Miner. He was in Singapore when he was a junior officer in the army.
- Robert John Blow, Major Miner's friend when he was in Singapore, who was a Taoist.
- Pete Burnett
- Amy, an American girl from Boston there as a tourist. She is later renamed Rose of Sharon by Oyster. Her mother left home to live with artists, and her father does research in mathematics and is unstable. After high school she decided not to go to Wellesley College and bought a flight ticket to India with the tuition refund. There she stayed in a community with a guru, who enjoined her to go to the reef, which she took to be the Great Barrier Reef. She then met Gideon and Oyster, and moved to Outer Maroo.
- Stephen, Amy's brother. He has a cottage in Maine.
- Sarah Cohen, Amy's stepmother. She is an American Jew. Although she lost her grandparents in the Holocaust, she is unorthodox, so much so that her sister, who has moved to Israel, spurns her for having married a non-Jew. She doesn't understand the people from Outer Maroo's passivity and lack of civil disobedience.
- Angelo, a.k.a. Gideon. He is Nick's son.
- Nick McCree, whose real name is Nikos Makarios. He was born in Greece but his family moved to Australia when he was a child. He retains a faint foreign accent. His wife left him for another man and he won custody.
- Donny Becker, a man who helpe Mercy get away from the Reef.
- Bernie O'Donoghue, the local publican.
- Jess Hyde, she works in the pub. She tends to keep silent and therefore people tell her their secrets. Her father was a railway ganger who killed a man in a drunken scuffle, was sent to jail and killed himself there. Subsequently, her mother took to drinking and was sent to a rehabilitation centre in Goodna. Jess was sent to a convent in Roma at age seven. She then ran away, was nearly raped, and eventually arrived at Outer Maroo.
- Mrs Dempsey, an old lady whom Charles Given visits on her deathbed.
- Tim Doolan, an opal-grinder for Bernie.
- Bugger Harvey, an opal fossicker and a bushie. He is friends with Murris.
- Simon Peter, a.k.a. Rob. In a letter he says he loves Outer Maroo and enjoins Luce, his ex-girlfriend, to come join him.
- Matt. In a letter he writes to his brother Jimbo, to say he needs money to leave Outer Maroo.

== Main themes ==
- Life in the outback, with the small-town culture, opal-mining, the fact that inhabitants are often people who wanted to forget about their previous life.
- Cults and their corrosive effect on members of a cult.

== References to other works ==
- The Book of Revelation is a leitmotif throughout the novel. More broadly speaking, the Bible is also pervasive.
- Several painters are alluded to by Susannah Rover : Georges-Pierre Seurat (La Baignade), Monet, Russell Drysdale and Rembrandt.
- Susannah also refers to John Locke and to Lewis Carroll's Alice in Wonderland and The Walrus and the Carpenter.
- Robert John Blow is said to have read Confucius, Tao Te Ching and Chuang-Tzu.
- Other references include W. B. Yeats, Charles Dickens' The Pickwick Papers, and Jonathan Swift.
