= Medalon =

Novel by Jennifer Fallon

- Medalon first edition cover.
- Author: Jennifer Fallon
- Language: English
- Series: The Demon Child
- Genre: Fantasy
- Publisher: HarperCollins
- Publication date: 26 July 2000
- Publication place: Australia
- Media type: Print (Paperback)
- Pages: 616 (first edition)
- ISBN: 0-7322-6477-4
- Followed by: Treason Keep

Medalon is a fantasy novel written by Australian author Jennifer Fallon. It is the first in a trilogy titled The Demon Child; the other two are Treason Keep and Harshini.

== Summary ==
Medalon Country is surrounded by Karien, threatening from the north with Fardohnya and Hythria in the south. For hundreds of years the Medalonians co-existed peacefully with the Harshini, a mythical race that is now long gone and the Sisters of the Blade now rule from the Citadel. The Harshini and their demons are thought to be extinct and Medalon has an uneasy peace with the other countries.

R'shiel Tenragan and her half-brother Tarja, children of the current First Sister, find themselves caught up in the political schemes of the Sisters. When their mother's plotting becomes too much the siblings flee and find a world in turmoil. Meanwhile, Brak, a Harshini outcast, is called to find the demon child, the half-human child of the dead Harshini King, Lorandranek.
