= The Last Albatross =

2000 novel by Ian Irvine

- Australian cover
- Author: Ian Irvine
- Language: English
- Series: The Human Rites Trilogy
- Genre: Future eco-thriller
- Publisher: Simon & Schuster Australia
- Publication date: November 2000
- Publication place: Australia
- Media type: Print (Paperback), ePub
- Followed by: Terminator Gene

The Last Albatross is the first book in Ian Irvine's Eco-thriller titles, set in 2010. It depicts what our world might be like in a few years time, focusing on environmental depletion and cultural degeneration. There is a large emphasis on green cults and terrorists, as well as a love story. The ePub version of the eBook is available to download for free on Ian Irvine's website. It is also available on the Amazon Kindle, but is not free.

== Characters ==
- Jemma Elizabeth Hardey: is wife to Ryn Hardey. After finding out that Ryn and Hercus Barges stole plutonium from Maralinga, she enters her name into the Death Lottery and is haunted by emails encouraging her to commit suicide, like thousands of others around the world. She returns home to Ryn where they are chased and tracked. Jemma is a timid character who grows with confidence throughout the novel.
- Ryn Hardey: is the husband of Jemma Hardey. He steals some plutonium from Maralinga with Hercus Barges, a dominant friend from university. Years later he and his wife are threatened by desperate green cults, determined to get their hands on the explosive material.
- Hercus Barges:
- Levi Seth:
- Ulf Bamert:

== Reception ==
Jackie Cassada said in her review for Library Journal that "the author of The View from the Mirror crafts a chilling sf suspense story set against a backdrop of 21st-century environmental depletion and cultural degeneration. First published in Australia, Irvine's latest novel, the first in a trilogy of eco-thrillers, portrays a frighteningly plausible near future".

== Titles of the Human Rites Sequence ==
- The Last Albatross (November 2000)
- Terminator Gene (April 2003)
- The Life Lottery (August 2004)

== Publishers ==
- Simon & Schuster Australia
- Mobipocket
