= The Lady of the Sorrows =

Book by Cecilia Dart-Thornton

- Author: Cecilia Dart-Thornton
- Cover artist: Paul Gregory
- Language: English
- Series: The Bitterbynde Trilogy
- Genre: Fantasy novel
- Publisher: Pan Macmillan Australia Pty Ltd and Leaves of Gold Press Pty Ltd
- Publication date: 15 May 2003
- Publication place: Australia
- Media type: Print (Hardback & Paperback)
- ISBN: 0-330-36411-1
- OCLC: 155999396
- Preceded by: The Ill-Made Mute
- Followed by: The Battle of Evernight

The Lady of the Sorrows is the second book in The Bitterbynde Trilogy written by Cecilia Dart-Thornton. It is preceded by The Ill-Made Mute and followed by the last book in the trilogy, The Battle of Evernight, which closes the trilogy.

== Plot summary ==
Imrhien, who has had her face and voice cured but not her memory, has not completed her mission yet. Maeve One-Eye, the carlin who cured her, gets Imrhien a new identity: Lady Rohain Tarrenys of the Sorrow Isles. Imrhien/Rohain, under cover of night to escape mysterious watchers, heads to Caermelor. After unloading her information with the Duke of Roxburgh, getting assigned a maid, Viviana, and enduring a strenuous dinner with the cruel, jealous Dianella, Rohain heads on a Dainnan frigate to the treasure cache at Waterstair where her friend Sianadh was killed. There the plunderers are captured and the treasure is recovered. Rohain is subsequently rewarded. Afterwards, Rohain travels Isse Tower, where she learns about an unseelie place called Huntingtowers. However, the owner of Huntingtowers leads an attack on Isse Tower, which the King-Emperor and the Dainnan thwart. Back at Isse Tower, Rohain is reunited with Thorn. They leave for Caermelor with Caitri, a kind servant who helped Rohain when she was a servant. Then Thorn is forced to go to Namarre, and despite her pleas to go with him, sends Rohain, in the company of friends, to the royal island sanctuary, Tamhania/Tavaal. When unseelie birds destroy the island, Tamhania is evacuated. Rohain, Viviana and Caitri survive the catastrophe and shelter in a house on the mainland that seems familiar to Rohain. She sends the others to Isse tower while she continues her journey to Huntingtowers, but they follow her. In the wilderness, she renames herself Tahquil, meaning 'warrior'. When they get to Huntingtowers, Imrhein/Rohain/Tahquil discovers a bracelet her father once gave her. This triggers her memory, and she remembers her name, Ashalind, her childhood and how she lost her memory. She also remembers her original quest, to find the exiled Faeran High King Angavar and his entourage and inform him of the whereabouts of the last gate between the Faeren world and Erith, without tipping off his brother Morragan, who is also exiled.

== Characters ==
- 'Imrhien is the main protagonist of the Bitterbynde Trilogy.
- Dianella is a minor antagonist in the story. She attempts to remove Rohain from the Royal Court.
- Thomas is a protagonist, Finvarnan duke, a Dainnan commander and Rohain's first suitor.
- Viviana Wellesly is Rohain's faithful maid.
- Caitri L. is a little girl who was nice to Rohain when she was a servant and became one of Rohain's companions.
- Thorn is the King-Emperor who posed as a Dainnan Ranger/Knight and won Rohain's heart.
- Ustorix is the future lord of Isse Tower
- Tamlain Conmor is the Duke of Roxburgh and the Commander in Chief of the Dainnan
