= Wolfblade =

2004 novel by Jennifer Fallon

- First edition cover
- Author: Jennifer Fallon
- Language: English language
- Series: The Hythrun Chronicles
- Genre: Fantasy
- Publisher: HarperCollins
- Publication date: 30 June 2004
- Publication place: Australia
- Media type: Print (hardback & paperback)
- Pages: 640 (first edition)
- ISBN: 0-7322-7890-2
- Followed by: Warrior

Wolfblade is a fantasy novel written by Australian author Jennifer Fallon. It is the first in a trilogy titled the Wolfblade Trilogy.

Wolfblade is a prequel to the author's The Hythrun Chronicles, set perhaps thirty years before The Demon Child Trilogy, but written later—which explains the confusing alternate designation of the Wolfblade novel as a part of a six book "Hythrun Chronicles" including "The Demon Child Trilogy".

== Synopsis ==
In Wolfblade the novel, Marla Wolfblade begins her rise, from naive sister of a decadent High Prince, to politically aware mother of the heir to the throne. As a noblewoman of Hythria, the young Marla is little more than a valuable womb for sale. She is sold to a neighbouring king then kidnapped—with her consent—by Hythrian "Royalists", determined that the father of the next ruler will be Hythrian. As Marla gains experience in the politics of the land, she also gains in understanding that her son is in constant danger, from those who would replace the heir to the throne with one of their own choosing.

As Marla loses some friends and supporters, she gains others. Her honesty and compassion—supported by the political advice of Elezaar, the dwarf slave—win her loyal friends. This includes Wrayan Lightfinger, self-proclaimed as the greatest thief in Hythria. He is also inheritor of the magical powers of the mysterious, pacifist and believed disappeared race of the Harshini.

Most of the action of this fantasy novel is political, supported by threats of battle, occasional sword fights and assassinations. There is strong magic, which plays only a minor role. Even the gods take a hand, dropping by for discussion and debate with the magic users. The gods generally use their influence, magic users keep a low profile, and the human nobility do all of the dirty work.

== Characters ==
- Marla Wolfblade – Princess of Hythria and lead protagonist.
- Elezaar – Dwarf, Court'esa and Marla's closest advisor. He teaches Marla the infamous rules of gaining and wielding power.
- Alija Eaglespike – Lead Antagonist, Innate of the Sorcerers Collective, Wife of the Warlord Barnardo Eaglespike.
- Nashan Hawksword – Marla's Love interest, Son of the Warlord of one of the Hythrian provinces.
- Kagan Palenovar – Head of the Sorcerer's Collective, and a powerful political entity in Hythria.
- Wrayan Lightfinger – Apprentice to Kagan, and possessor of inexplicably strong magical power, which he must learn to channel.
- Brak – Lord Brakandaran te Carn.
- Laran Krakenshield – Warlord of Krakandar.
- Lernen Wolfblade – High Prince and ruler of Hythria. Marla's sexually perverse older brother.
- Damin Wolfblade – Marla and Laran Krakenshield's first child and heir to the Hythrun throne.
- Hablet – King of Fardohnya.
- Dacendaran – God of Thieves, appears in the form of an unkempt young boy with mismatched clothing.
- Kalianah – Goddess of Love. Typically appears in the form of a young girl-child.
- Zegarnald – God of War.
- Geri Almodavar – Captain of Damin Wolfblade's Raiders.
