= Due Preparations for the Plague =

2003 crime novel by Australian author Janette Turner Hospital

- Author: Janette Turner Hospital
- Language: English
- Genre: Crime novel
- Publisher: HarperCollins
- Publication date: 2003
- Publication place: Australia
- Media type: Print
- Pages: 390 pp.
- Awards: 2003 Queensland Premier's Literary Awards — Best Fiction Book, winner; 2004 Davitt Award, Best Adult Novel, winner
- ISBN: 0732277302

Due Preparations for the Plague is a 2003 crime novel by Australian author Janette Turner Hospital.

It was the winner of the Queensland Premier's Literary Awards — Best Fiction Book in 2003, and the Davitt Award for Best Adult Novel in 2004.

== Synopsis ==
Lowell Hawthorne's mother was killed during a 1987 hijacking of an Air France flight. His life is falling apart around him: his marriage appears over, he is distanced from his children and he is now being harassed by a woman named Samantha, who, as a child, survived the same hijacking that killed Lowell's mother. She is a member of the Phoenix Club, a group of hijack survivors, who take it upon themselves to try to solve the mystery of this hijacking. Lowell's father had collected a sackful of notes about the hijacking which seem to point to a high-level Government cover-up.

== Critical reception ==
Liam Davison, reviewing the novel for The Sydney Morning Herald, wrote: "As a political thriller, Due Preparations for the Plague works remarkably well. It is taut and well paced with the pieces of the puzzle dossiers, video transcripts, coded messages falling compellingly into place. Its engagement with current world politics and the threads it draws from the recent past make it a particularly timely work and force a reassessment of who holds the political high moral ground."

A reviewer for Publishers Weekly concluded of the novel: "In intense, lyrical prose, Hospital introduces seemingly disparate characters and places and connects them through an elaborate and poignantly tragic plot, only disrupted by the distracting inclusion of overelaborate descriptions of terrorist tactics. In this age of global terrorism, Hospital's sophisticated psychological thriller offers a thought-provoking glimpse of the sociopolitical intricacies of the individuals and organizations that track terrorism, as well as of the enduring personal struggles of those left behind after an attack."

== Awards ==
- 2003 Queensland Premier's Literary Awards — Best Fiction Book, winner
- 2004 Davitt Award for Best Adult Novel, winner
- 2004 Adelaide Festival Awards for Literature, shortlisted
- 2004 New South Wales Premier's Literary Awards — Christina Stead Prize for Fiction, shortlisted

== Notes ==
- Epigraph:

I have often asked myself what I mean by preparations for the plague...and I think that preparations for the plague are preparations for death. But what is it to make preparations for death? or what preparations are proper to be make for death?

— Daniel Defoe, Due Preparations for the Plague (1722)

To state quite simply what we learn in a time of pestilence: that there are more things to admire in men than to despise.

— Albert Camus, The Plague

- Sally Blakeney interviewed the author about the novel for The Weekend Australian
- Jane Sullivan interviewed the author about the novel, and provided some history as to how it came about, for The Age newspaper.

== Publication history ==
After the novel's initial publication by HarperCollins in 2003 it was reprinted as follows:

- 2003 W. W. Norton, USA
- 2004 Harper Perennial, UK
- 2014 HarperCollins, Australia
- 2016 Fourth Estate, UK

The novel was also translated into French and Dutch in 2003, Spanish in 2004, and Japanese in 2007.

== See also ==
- 2003 in Australian literature
