= The Key (Curley novel) =

2005 novel by Marianne Curley

- First edition
- Author: Marianne Curley
- Cover artist: Ian Butterworth
- Language: English
- Series: Guardians of Time Trilogy
- Genre: Science fiction, Fantasy novel
- Publisher: Bloomsbury Press
- Publication date: 2005
- Publication place: Australia
- Media type: Print (Hardback & Paperback)
- Pages: 413
- ISBN: 0-7475-7334-4
- OCLC: 65749076
- Preceded by: The Dark

The Key is a fantasy novel written by Marianne Curley. It is the third book in the Guardians of Time Trilogy.

== Narration ==
As with all of the Guardians of Time books, the prologue is written in the third person, while all the chapters are written in the first person switching points of view between two narrators. In this book, the two narrators are Rochelle and Matt.

In this installment of the series, Matt and Rochelle struggle to deal with the impending battle, which has been predicted to decide the fate of the Named. Meanwhile, tensions have been mounting as romance between the Named forms, much to the displeasure of some characters. A traitor has also been discovered. This book basically states the struggles between different characters point of view mostly from Rochelle, but finds a way to get through them by ignoring the accusations

== Setting ==
The story is set in Angel Falls which is located above the ancient city of Veridian.

The story is set in the present or near-present time. Some of the story takes place in the past, in a variety of times/places. It also takes place in the Underworld realm and the Heavenly realm.

More so than in the previous two novels, the story takes place in the lost city and a mythical city of Atlantis, pre-sinking. Other locations of action include the high school in Angel Falls and the woods surrounding the city, where the epic battle takes place.

== Reception ==
Shelle Rosenfeld in her review for Booklist said that "Matt and Rochelle's alternating, present-tense first-person narratives add suspense to an engrossing, if not dense, read, driven by detailed descriptions of a dizzying array of magic devices, events, time periods and settings." School Library Journal said in their review that "other than brief references, the book relies entirely on familiarity with the earlier volumes for understanding the causes of action and all other background. The characters never really develop and the dialogue borders on being overwrought. The constant action may appeal to fans of the earlier volumes."

== See also ==
- The Named
- The Dark
