= The Iron Tree =

2004 fantasy novel by Australian author Cecilia Dart-Thornton

- First edition
- Author: Cecilia Dart-Thornton
- Cover artist: Julek Heller
- Series: The Crowthistle Chronicles
- Genre: Fantasy novel
- Publisher: Tor Books
- Publication date: August 2004
- ISBN: 0-330-43301-6

The Iron Tree is a fantasy novel written by Australian author Cecilia Dart-Thornton. It was originally published by Tor books in 2004 and is the first book in the Crowthistle Chronicles.

== The Crowthistle Chronicles ==
Although the inside of The Iron Tree states that the Crowthistle Chronicles will consist of three books,

1. The Iron Tree
2. The Well of Tears
3. Fallowblade

There are four books in the series:

1. The Iron Tree (2004)
2. The Well of Tears (2005)
3. The Weatherwitch (2006)
4. Fallowblade (2007)

== Synopsis ==
The story begins in a small desert town of R'shael in the kingdom of Asqualeth. Jarred and his friends set off on an adventure to explore the world of The Four Kingdoms of Tir. On the way they are ambushed by Marauders, mountain folk that are deformed and spend their lives pillaging villages and unwary travelers. Jarred is found out by his friends to be invulnerable however one of their party is injured and they are forced to take refuge in Marsh Town in the kingdom of Slievmordhu. There Jarred falls in love at first sight with a Marsh daughter Lilith. When the party are to depart Jarred decides to stay and start a family with Lilith; it is soon learned however a terrible curse runs in the family of Lilith and Jarred must try to find the cure before it devours Lilith. Little do they know, they will find Jarred's gift and Lilith's curse stem from a past that intertwines them.

== Reception ==
Kliatt called the book "uneven and flawed", but "more successful in the latter part of her tale".
