= Lion of Senet =

2002 novel by Jennifer Fallon

- Lion of Senet first edition cover
- Author: Jennifer Fallon
- Language: English
- Series: Second Sons
- Genre: Fantasy
- Publisher: HarperCollins
- Publication date: October 1, 2002
- Publication place: Australia
- Media type: Print (Paperback)
- Pages: 657 (first edition)
- ISBN: 0-7322-7512-1
- OCLC: 52686537
- Followed by: Eye of the Labyrinth

Lion of Senet is a fantasy novel written by Australian author Jennifer Fallon. It is the first in a trilogy titled the Second Sons.

== Plot summary ==
The novel is set in the fantasy world of Ranadon, where there is no night time. Two suns orbit the earth and bathe it in light constantly. A religious sect known as the Shadowdancers claim this is the work of the Goddess, a deity both benign and merciless, whom most in the world believe in. The back story is that many years ago the second sun mysteriously vanished and left Ranadon in the Age of Shadows. At the insistence of the self-appointed High Priestess of the Shadow dancers, Belegren, the lion of Senet, a powerful and devout man named Antonov, sacrificed his baby son Gunta, after which the second sun returned and so it has been ever since. Dirk Provin, the second son of the Duke Wallin Provin of Elcast, saves a wounded sailor from a shipwreck, brought about by a volcanic eruption and consequent earthquake. Through the course of the man's recovery it is revealed that he is in fact, Johan Thorn, the exiled King of Dhevyn who was utterly defeated by Antonov during the Age of Shadows, and is now the most wanted man in Ranadon. News of this reaches the Lion of Senet himself, who arrives with Belegren the High Priestess, on Elcast, and the secret web of lies which had been built up around Dirk and everything he ever knew begins to slowly unravel, as the apprentice physician comes to realise that others are slowly drawing their own plans around him.
