= The Guardians of Time =

Novel trilogy by Marianne Curley

Guardians of Time is a trilogy of novels written by Marianne Curley. The plot of the trilogy consists of the Guardians of Time (the Guard), trying to protect the past, present, and future by traveling into the past to thwart their enemies, and the Order of Chaos (the Order), who are trying to change past events to give themselves more power.

The original books in this trilogy are The Named, The Dark, and The Key. In 2018, Curley added a fourth book to the series by publishing The Shadow.

== Setting ==
The story is set in a fictionalized Angel Falls (for the real place, see Angel Falls) which is directly above the ancient city of Veridian. The town is set in Australia, somewhere in the outback or a national park, not far from Sydney, according to the coordinates given in The Dark. This town is secluded and borders the Australian bush. Waterfalls, forests and streams encase the town. Most importantly, the town people do not know that their town is located directly above the ancient lost city of Veridian, which is where an ancient prophecy exists. From context, the town appears to be small and spread out, the [high] school having a small population.

The story appears to be set in the present or just a few years in the past.

== Universe ==
=== The Guard ===
The Guardians of Time (known also as The Guard) is a society dedicated to preserving history against the attempts of the Order of Chaos to alter it. It is headed by a sexless immortal called Lorian who is backed by a Tribunal of nine members, each a representative of a house.

The headquarters of the Tribunal, as well as the Guard itself, is located in Athens, year 200 BC, outside of the mortal measurements of time. For their purposes they also use a place called the Citadel, connected to another area known as the labyrinth (also used by Order of Chaos) which serves as a disembarkation point for the Guards' missions into the past. Guard meetings frequently take place in Arkarian's, a Guard member's abode hidden within the depths of a mountain. Connected to this mountain is the hidden city of Veridian and later learned, also connected to Neriah's fortress.

=== The Order ===
The Order of Chaos (known also as The Order) is the collective group of villains in the series. It was created by, and is currently led by Lathenia, the Goddess of Chaos. The Order seeks to alter the Prophecy predicting their fall by changing the events of the past. As the Goddess of chaos, Lathenia attempts to manipulate the past in order to alter the present to create chaos (floods, famines, etc.) for her own benefit. Her ultimate goal is to gain control of the world because she believes that she should have been born first, rather than her brother Lorian. The identities of the members of the Order are kept secret, even from each other, so we don't find out how many of them are in the books. The Guard battles against the Order, trying to protect the present from their attempts at destroying it.

=== Realms ===
Realms are separate locations existing in alternate dimensions. To travel to another realm a rift must be opened to it, allowing travel to the other realm. Only Immortals or several other powerful beings acting together can create a rift. A single person with the given power of agelessness which endows the receiver with some reduced immortal powers, generally cannot force a rift to open by themselves.

==== Earthly realm ====
The Earthly realm is where most of the book takes place. The Citadel, Tribunal, etc. are all in the Earthly realm.

The Earthly realm is unique in that it is the last of the living realms - that is, it's the only realm that is still creating new souls. In order for the realm to remain living, evil must not be allowed to completely dominate the realm. For instance the Underworld was once a living realm but ceased to be after evil took over.

==== Middle realm ====
The Middle realm is where lost souls wander until they reach the afterlife. They "cross over" when they cross a bridge over a river leading them presumably to the Heavenly realm. This bridge is destroyed in The Key and replaced with a portal leading directly to the Underworld.

Souls generally wind up here when someone dies outside of their time. If the body their soul inhabits dies while they are in the past, their soul will enter the Middle realm instead of passing directly to the Heavenly realm. Souls trapped in this realm can be returned to their bodies in the present but the person's Soul-mate must enter the middle realm and call out to them; they can hear no other person's voice and cannot exit any other way than the passover otherwise.

==== Heavenly realm ====
The Heavenly realm is an extremely large place; in The Key, Matt arrives somewhere in the middle of the realm, and travels 90 billion kilometers to reach the edge of the realm.

The Heavenly realm is divided into seven levels, each with its own sun. On higher levels you can see the suns of all the levels below you. Any souls not trapped in the Underworld can enter this realm upon death (it can also be visited by those who are not dead as well, as long as guided with an Immortal). John Wren enters this realm on level 1 after being freed from the Underworld. All levels below 7 appear to be some sort of purgatory where the soul is cleansed before it is allowed to the next level (John Wren murdered his wife and then killed himself).

Dartemis hides by being just slightly outside of this realm's borders. It is unclear how this is accomplished or what realm he may be considered to be in but it is clear that this convinces everyone that he is dead as they cannot sense him anywhere in any realm.

There are a number of other ways to move from the middle realm to the heavenly realm. The key one is to seek forgiveness on what brings the soul to the middle realm.

There are also a number of additional reasons why souls can be in the middle realm. Currently there are millions (not hundreds of millions or billions) of souls in the middle realm. The oldest soul in the middle realm is likely to have been there for thousands of years.

==== Underworld ====
The Underworld is very dark and full of strange creatures. These creatures are souls that have been trapped in the Underworld and have become deformed because of this. The land itself has developed trials that one must endure to cross the land.

At the center of an acid lake there is a building capable of opening a rift into a similar room inside the Citadel. This building was constructed and used by the survivors. The survivors were people who fled the Underworld as it was about to be taken over by evil. They escaped into the Earthly realm and made the city of Atlantis. Their technology at that time was significantly more advanced than current technology. When Atlantis sank into the ocean the survivors then built the Citadel and made it invisible to natives of the Earthly realm, as their technology was far too advanced to be seen by them. Since then the survivors have also been known as the angels and they help operate the Citadel.

==== Other realms ====
In the books there are references to "other realms" and it is said that there are many of these other realms. They are never visited or spoken about in more detail than this.

In Marianne Curley's Guardians of Time Trilogy series of fictional books, members of the Guard and Order usually have two birth powers, sometimes three. They are taught to use these powers by their trainers. When they are initiated they are given gifts by each of the members of the Tribunal. These gifts can be a strengthening or focusing of existing powers, abilities, additional powers (rare), or reinforcement of a character's weak area.

=== Powers ===
Members of the Guard and Order usually have two birth powers, sometimes three. They are taught to use these powers by their trainers. When they are initiated, they are given gifts by each of the members of the Tribunal. These gifts can be a strengthening or focusing of existing powers, abilities, additional powers (rare), or reinforcement of a character's weak area.

- Illusion

Description: The ability to create illusions and recreate scenes in midair. These objects, if a person believes in them, become real and usable.
Uses: It may be used to confuse an enemy, re-create an event in full detail (for telling a story), and to encouraging belief (used to help *Isabel cross an invisible bridge on the way to Veridian).
Characters: Ethan

- Animation

Description: This power gives the user the ability to move and animate objects.
Uses: This power can be used to levitate objects, 'Call' objects to hand, and to move objects too heavy for normal means.
Characters: Ethan

- Identifying Touch

Description : The ability to tell what objects are made of and details about them
Uses: This power may be used to identify poisons or other dangerous substances, identifying contents of an object, and finding out what is below ground.
Combined uses: This power can be combined with Truth seeing, giving the power to see into a person's mind. Among other things, this can be used to determine a person's true loyalty.
Characters: Rochelle

- Trust in the Prophecy

Description: Unnatural instincts that turn out to be right, even if there is no explanation for them at the time. Generally characterized as an unexplained need to do something despite it making no logical sense, and usually involving some kind of risk. This power can be given as a gift, however, the birth power is more pronounced, where the given power may simply indicate a choice to make, the birth power may bring up whole schemes out of nothing.
Uses: This power activates whenever the situation requires it.
Characters: #Ethan

- Truth seeing

Description: The ability to hear other people's thoughts, although Guard and Order members are often taught how to screen or scramble their thoughts so others cannot read them. A person with this ability is called a Truthseer. This power is given to every member of the Tribunal in order for them to render judgements more accurately. Because of this, it is generally considered improper to hide your thoughts from Tribunal members while at a hearing. This also allows the Tribunal members to deliberate without speaking.
Uses: Nonverbal communication with other Truth seers, and people with the power of Enhanced Hearing
Combined uses: This power can be combined with Identifying Touch, giving the power to see into a person's mind. Among other things, this can be used to determine a person's true loyalty.
Characters: Rochelle, Neriah (given), Matt, Arkarian, Lorian, Lathenia, Marduke, Dartemis, and all Tribunal members (given)

- Healing

Description: The ability to heal a person by touch and concentration.
Uses: Healing can be used to heal wounds during battle, to Remove poisons, identify the cause of an illness (so as to prevent inadvertent modification of the past, if the disease or injury is natural or supposed to happen)
Combined uses: After the power amplification given at the beginning of The Key, this power can be combined with Psychic Prediction to heal at a distance.
Characters: Isabel

- Enhanced Strength

Description: The ability to have an unnaturally high amount of strength.
Uses: Enhanced Strength can be used to carry heavy loads, and during combat.
Characters: Dillon

- Extrasensory Hearing

Description: This ability amplifies the hearing of the recipient, and can be used to communicate with others, and hear extremely quiet or faraway sounds.
Uses: Enhanced Hearing may be used for communication, detecting sounds, and being able to hear coming dangers.
Characters: Mr. Carter

- Psychic Prediction

Description: This ability gives the person dreams or trances in which the character can see images of the future. They can be rather sudden, and can predict events in the near or later future.
Uses: Psychic Prediction may be used to communicate with beings in different Realms, and to predict future events(unreliable due to inability to induce future sight and image faintness).
Combined uses: After the power amplification given at the beginning of The Key, this power can be combined with the Healing power to heal at a distance.
Characters: Isabel

- Agelessness

Description This power stops the ageing process. If this power is given before the receiver's 18th birthday, it does not take effect until that time. This power can only be given by an Immortal and is given to every Tribunal member.
Uses: Gives user the power to stop aging at the age of 18, extending their life.
Characters: Arkarian, Isabel, Marduke, and all Tribunal members (except for Lorian, who is Immortal)

- Shape-Shifting

Description: The power to transform one-self into an animal
Uses: Shape-Shifting into different animals to adapt to their surroundings (Matt turns into a shark to save Ethan and a dolphin to save Rochelle)
Characters: Neriah, Matt

- Animation of Drawings

Description: This allows the person with this power to make their drawings come to life, and also with great practice can open up portals to different realms through drawings.
Uses: This skill is used for creating lifelike drawings (Neriah drew a mouse on a rock and it came to life temporarily), and opening up portals between realms.
Characters: Neriah

== Characters ==
=== Immortals ===
- Lorian is the head of the Guardians of Time, and the Tribunal. He is the first-born son of gods; Lathenia and Dartemis are his siblings. Born male, he chooses to identify as genderless in order to remain unbiased in his position of power. Unnaturally tall with skin that emanates brightness and violet eyes, his aura is too powerful for many members of the Guard to bear; in The Named, Isabel falls out of her seat after making eye contact with him. Upon realizing that his sister could become too powerful, Lorian secretly fathered Arkarian in an attempt to create a new Immortal. When that fails, he compensates by gifting Arkarian with agelessness. Lorian dies in The Key, in an ultimate battle between himself and Lathenia.
- Lathenia is the leader of the Order of Chaos. From birth she is jealous of Lorian, believing that he robbed her of the honor of being first-born. Referred to as 'The Goddess', she created an army whose sole purpose is to alter the events of history in order to change the present to suit her desires. Her goal is total domination over the realms, and various disasters from wide-spread disease to natural disasters are credited to her Order. She holds control over the underworld and employs some of the beasts that wander there, including wrens (man-like bird creatures), vultons (massive birds with pouches that can be used for carrying poison), and demons. Her closest soldier Marduke is also her soulmate. After his disfiguration and first death, her rage against the Guard reaches new heights. Lathenia believes that Lorian killed their youngest brother Dartemis in order to secure more power over her. Lathenia dies in the Key in an ultimate battle between herself and Lorian.
- Dartemis is the youngest of the Immortal triplets, though his power is greatest. Lorian sensed his power and secured him away in the Heavenly realm beyond time and space, where he lives unnoticed by Lathenia. When Lorian failed to create another immortal, Dartemis met and fell in love with a woman on Earth, and succeeded in conceiving Matt, but left shortly after. He places Jimmy in charge of protecting Matt's mother, hoping that he will one day be able to bring her to his palace to live with him. When it comes time for Matt's training, Dartemis spends six months teaching his son everything he can in order to prepare Matt to lead the Named.
- Matthew "Matt" Becket grew up in Angel Falls believing that he was normal, born to two human parents. When his abusive "father" walks out on the family, he makes Matt promise to take care of his mother and sister. In The Dark, it is revealed that their father left because he learned that Matt was not his biological son. Matt takes his promise seriously and spends a majority of time looking out for Isabel, who finds him arrogant and smothering. He lives in ignorance of the Guard, the Order, and the Named, happy to date his girlfriend Rochelle and keep and eye on his former best friend, Ethan. Matt's life changes dramatically when he is kidnapped by Marduke and he learns that his girlfriend is a spy and that he is destined to lead the Named in the final battle against the Order of Chaos. Brought into the Guard before his powers have shown, his first year of training with Ethan is difficult. He trusts very few people, believing the prophecy is wrong in naming him. On his first mission into the past, he survives a dynamite blast and is sent to train with Dartemis, who teaches him the powers of an immortal, one of which is the ability to gift immortality to his soulmate. As he is pulled into the Guard before his natural powers show, it is unclear what skills he learned and what skills he was born with.
- Neriah Gabriel, the ninth member of the Named and last to join the Guard, was Marduke's daughter. She makes her first appearance in the series at the end of The Named, as an illusion Ethan uses to distract Marduke. She does not appear again until The Dark. Neriah and her mother spent most of their lives in hiding, and it is referenced in The Key that she grew up on an island. A small staff of people sent in by the Guard maintain Neriah's home with her mother. The other members of the Named, with the exception of Arkarian, believe that Neriah is not aware of her destiny or the Guard. Quiet and shy, she joins public school for the first time and is shown around by Isabel. Both Dillon and Matt develop strong feelings for her, causing Dillon to act rashly, which leads Matt to pull away. It is later revealed that she and Matt are soulmates, and she is awarded the gift of immortality in order to spend eternity with him.

=== Tribunal members ===
The Tribunal is the governing body of the Guard. They are responsible for initiating new members into the Guard, deciding on important issues, and rendering judgments cases such as power abuse, etc. Each represents a house, has a sector of the Earth to watch over, and an army of the Guard.

- Lady Devine is leader of the House of Divinity.
- Meridian is leader of the House of Kavanah.
- Queen Brystianne is leader of the House of Averil.
- 'Sir Syford is leader of the House of Syford.
- Elenna is leader of the House of Isle.
- Lord Alexandon is leader of the House of Criers.
- Lady Arabella is leader of the House of Sky and Water. Lady Arabella is kind to animals and cares for them. In The Key, it is revealed that Lady Arabella loved Lorian. She was wrongfully accused of being a traitor by Matt when she was found caring for birds that were actually Neriah's missing dogs Silos and Aysher. Arabella also helped to transport Ethan, Matt, and Isabel to the Underworld. She is one of the allies Lorian took with him on his meeting with Lathenia in The Key.
- Lord Penbarin is leader of the House of Samartyne. He helped Ethan in a lot of situations, including transporting Ethan, Matt, and Isabel to the Underworld. He was one of the allies Lorian took with him on his meeting with Lathenia in The Key.
- King Richard is leader of the House of Veridian. Once King Richard II of England, he was brought to Athens by Ethan, which fulfilled part of the prophecy. He was the last Tribunal member to be found. In The Key, he was Lorian's spy and pretended to be the lover of Lathenia.
- Lorian (Located in the "Immortals" section)

=== Members of The Guard ===
It is inferred that there are thousands of members of the Guard, but only nine belong to the Named, an elite group destined to take on the Order of Chaos. Characters are listed by their allegiances at the end of the trilogy.

- Arkarian Baguette is the son of Lorian. He has violet eyes and vibrant blue hair. As the son of an immortal, he has more power than the other members of the Guard. Arkarian was born in France to the daughter of a Lord, but grew up in poverty. He was indicted into the Guard at age 18, when he was given the power of agelessness, and spent the next 200 years under the apprenticeship of Lorian. When Ethan meets him, he is already 600 years old. Arkarian was supposed to be the mentor for Sera, but after her murder he had to take the responsibility of training Ethan, a job initially intended for Ethan's father, Shaun. Because of his skill, patience, and all-around good nature, Arkarian becomes the most trusted and most respected member of the Named. He discovers that he is Isabel's soulmate after he saves her from the Middle Realm and later pursues a romantic relationship, much to the annoyance of Matt. He is a narrator in The Dark.
- Ethan Roberts was Arkarian's apprentice, and trained Isabel, Matt, and Neriah. When he was younger, he and Matt were best friends, but when Rochelle arrived they grew apart. He sensed, as did she, that they were soul-mates, but they do not get together until the end of the Key. He is a narrator in The Named and plays a main role in The Dark and The Key. When Rochelle trudges down the hill during Neriah's training because Ethan didn't trust her, Ethan runs to her and admits that he trusts her and that he wanted her to know that he's always trusted her from the beginning she was accused.
- Isabel Becket is Matt's half-sister. She spent her childhood following Matt, Ethan and their friends around, partially because she had a crush on Ethan, and partially because she was into boyish things. She was Ethan's first Apprentice; she was physically fit, but needed help to use her powers. At the beginning of the first book, she is 15 years old. The Tribunal paired her up with Ethan, as it was known they were a good team. Later, she went on a mission with Arkarian, and they then start to pursue a relationship. She is awarded the Power of Agelessness, after Arkarian offers to give up his in order to live a normal life with her. Named. Powers: Healing, Psychic and Agelessness. She is a narrator in both The Named and The Dark.
- Rochelle Thallimar was Marduke's spy. As a child she was beaten by her father. She was sent in to break up the friendship between Matt and Ethan as part of Marduke's revenge against Ethan's father, Shaun. She had feelings for Ethan, but knew that she had to go out with Matt, so she ignored her feelings. She spent the years following pretending to love Matt, having succeeded in breaking up him and Ethan. She finally left the Order after rescuing Matt from Marduke. While in the Guard not many people trust her, Arkarian was the only person to trust her initially. After Lorian gives her a Power that makes her a target to the traitor, she has a curse laid on her that anyone who kills her will turn to stone by sunset. After some time of flirting back and forth, she and Ethan get together at the end of The Key; but she makes the ultimate sacrifice to save her love by jumping in front of a poisoned tip arrow that was meant for Ethan. It is unknown whether she went to the Heavenly realm, if so she can properly be contacted by Matt. Named. Powers: Truth seeing, analytic touch, & the ability to see someone's loyalty. She is one of 2 narrators in The Key
- Jimmy is selected by the immortal Dartemis to be the "protector" of his love, Matt and Isabel's mum, and his son, Matt. Jimmy is Matt and Isabel's mother's boyfriend during their time on earth. He also created the booby traps that surround the city of Veridian. His skills prove quite useful and he is granted with the highest access of security. He is also one of the most trusted members of the Guard. Named. Powers: To fix things & unlock anything.
- Shaun Roberts is the father of Ethan and Sera. He was once an honored member of the Guard. His partner and best friend Marduke fell in love with a woman in the past who was supposed to die. Marduke went against orders and laws to save the woman, altering the future. Shaun and Marduke's dispute ended in Shaun severely disfiguring Marduke's face. In order to save his children from Marduke's revenge, Shaun took it upon himself to leave the Guard. He returns later as he finds out about Ethan's training with the Guard and takes his rightful place within the prophecy's fulfillment. Named. Power: Unknown
- Dillon Sinclair first belonged to the Order as a highly classed soldier under Lathenia, who referred to him as Bastian. As a child, Dillon spent most of his time alone as his parents were alcoholics which fueled Dillon's dark desires. Despite his allegiance to the Order, he wishes to have been in the Guard, believing Arkarian had the power to choose who was Named. Dillon helps Arkarian after he is left as bait in the temple on Obsidian Island. After their escape, he is debriefed, and joins the Guard. Dillon's surname is listed as Kirby in The Named, but it later becomes Sinclair. Power: Super strength. He attains his "Wings" prior to The Dark.

=== Members of the Order ===
- Keziah is the dark wizard, ancient, kept alive by Lathenia who uses him to bid her will. In the Dark, he used his powers to make sure that Arkarian couldn't use his gifts to escape.
- Marduke was Shaun's partner in the guard, until he became traitor and left to join the Order. He became obsessed with both revenge upon Shaun, and his Family. He wanted to find his wife, who stole their child Neriah to save her from his wickedness, though he never wanted to kill Neriah. He began an affair with the Immortal, Lathenia, which continued even after his death and severe mutilation in the middle world, though it was implied that Lathenia was 'seeing' King Richard when he was sent in as a spy.
- Marcus Carter was at first a selected member of the Named, controlling navigation throughout the citadel. He is also Ethan, Isabel, Rochelle, and Dillon's history teacher. Ethan immediately has a bad vibe about him, though he and Ethan have never really gotten along to begin with. Ethan often calls him 'Croc-face'. At the end of The Key it is revealed that Mr. Carter is in fact Marduke's brother, Neriah's uncle, and a loyal member to the Order. He is last seen trapped in the Underworld, pursued by demons of the Underworld after attempting to throw Rochelle to a similar fate.

=== Miscellaneous ===
- John was a wren in the underworld. He was stuck there after he murdered his wife and himself. Unlike other wrens he has a conscience, and offers help to Ethan, Matt and Isabel when they travel to the underworld. In Key he is shown in the lowest level of the Heavenly realm.
- Coral Becket Mothered both Matt and Isabel, her relationship with Matt's father was cut off when he wiped her memory and left to reside in his palace at the edge of the Universe. After Isabel's father left, she met Jimmy, who was secretly sent by the guard to protect her and her family. She knows nothing about the guard.
- Laura Roberts is married to Shaun, and mother to Ethan and Sera. After her daughter's death, she became reclusive and depressed, and even after her husband's recovery her condition continued to worsen. Unbeknown to the others on Earth, this was caused by Sera trying to contact her mother, through dreams and thoughts. After Sera was freed from the underworld, she began to recover. She knows nothing about the Guard.
- Sera was the older sister of Ethan, and the daughter of Shaun and Mrs. Roberts. After being killed by Marduke, she taught herself how to control one of her skills in the underworld (as her spirit was trapped). She used her paranormal skills to send messages to her mother and Ethan. In 'The Dark' she helped Arkarian survive by bringing him food and sheltering him. She also contacted and guided Isabel, Ethan, and Matt while they were searching for Arkiarian in the Underworld. Her spirit crossed over to the heavenly realm along with John Wren's at the end of The Dark. Power: psychic.

== The series ==
1. The Named (2002) ISBN 0-7475-7539-8
2. The Dark (2003) ISBN 0-7475-7433-2
3. The Key (2005) ISBN 0-7475-7334-4
4. The Shadow (2017) ISBN 978-0648263609
