= Thorn Castle =

2008 children's fantasy novel by Ian Irvine

- First edition cover
- Author: Ian Irvine
- Illustrator: D. M. Cornish
- Cover artist: D. M. Cornish
- Language: English
- Series: The Sorcerer's Tower
- Genre: Fantasy novel
- Publisher: Omnibus Books
- Publication date: March 2008
- Publication place: Australia
- Media type: Print (Paperback)
- Pages: 96
- ISBN: 978-1-86291-658-6
- OCLC: 225343978
- Followed by: Giants Lair

Thorn Castle is a children's fantasy novel by Australian author Ian Irvine. It is the first of The Sorcerer's Tower series. The Sorcerer's Tower was a finalist for the 2008 Aurealis Award for best children's (8–12 years) illustrated work/picture book.

Thorn Castle has been reviewed by The Courier Mail and Reading Time.
