= The Named =

2002 fantasy novel by Marianne Curley

- Front cover
- Author: Marianne Curley
- Language: English
- Series: Guardians of Time Trilogy
- Publication date: 2002
- Publication place: Australia
- Pages: 333 (US Edition)
- ISBN: 0-7475-7539-8
- OCLC: 57063678
- Followed by: The Dark

The Named is a 2002 fantasy novel written by Marianne Curley. The first novel in the Guardians of Time Trilogy, it follows Ethan, a member of The Named, and his new apprentice, Isabel, who he is training under the guidance of his mentor Arkarian.

== Narration ==
As with all of the Guardians of Time books, the prologue is written in third person while all the chapters are written in first person, switching points of view between the two narrators, Ethan and Isabel. They are together for most of the book.

== Setting ==
The story is set in Angel Falls, which is located above the fictional ancient city of Verdiana. Angel Falls is a small, fictional town set near the Australian bush. The description of the high schools implies that the town is smaller than average.

The story is set in the present or near-present time. Some of the story takes place in the past, in a variety of times and places. For example, one of the earlier missions that Isabel takes with Ethan is to Medieval England, as well as colonial America.

== Plot summary ==
The Named opens with a prologue in which two children, Sera and Ethan, are running to witness a rare flower bloom. Ethan, at age four, recognizes his older sister's love for all things strange and otherworldly, and loves being included in her wonder. The moment of wonder is ruined by the appearance of a monster, Marduke, who murders 10-year-old Sera. Ethan's scream marks the transition from the prologue to the first chapter, where 16-year-old Ethan laments the recurring nightmare, he has about the death of his sister twelve years before.

Ethan's life changed drastically after the death of his sister; his parents, Laura and Shaun, are mere shells of themselves. Laura suffers from severe depression while Shaun exists in a state of perpetual numbness. His only solace is his position in The Guardians of Time, a group of soldiers organized by the immortal Lorian, whose sole purpose is to defeat the goddess Lathenia and her Order of Chaos. The Order's soldiers exist to alter the course of history in order to benefit their goddess; the more chaos created in the past increases her strength in the present. Ethan and his friend and mentor Arkarian spent the majority of the twelve years since Sera's death in training and going on missions to the past to stop the Order from derailing history. Ethan and Arkarian are not only members of the Guard, but also Named by an ancient prophecy that predicts the final battle between the Guard and the Order.

After years of devotion to the Guard, Ethan is rewarded with an apprentice. Should he train her well, he could be awarded the Guard's highest honor; the power of flight. His only concern is that his would-be apprentice is Isabel Beckett, the kid sister to his former best friend Matt. Isabel spent her childhood chasing after Ethan, Matt, and their friends, wishing to be included in their adventures while harboring a not-so-secret crush on Ethan. He remembers her as a pest, and knows that Matt, who believes Ethan is after his girlfriend, will make training difficult. After overcoming multiple difficulties, including accidentally showing one of his powers to his history teacher, Ethan and Isabel reconnect and form a strong friendship. They succeed on several missions, revealing other members of the Named along the way. Isabel's crush on Ethan grows and then dwindles as she gets closer with Arkarian, and her passion for the cause and her skills makes her a powerful member of the Named. With the prophecy slowly being fulfilled, more identities of the Order are made known. Ethan and Isabel learn that Marduke, the monster of Ethan's nightmares, is actually a member of the Order, who holds a vendetta against Shaun, a former member of the Named. In an effort to speed up the prophecy, Marduke challenges Shaun to a battle, where the members of the Named face off against Marduke and his best soldiers.

In a battle between the Named and Marduke, it is revealed that Matt's girlfriend Rochelle is also a member of the Order, and was planted by Marduke to break up Matt and Ethan's friendship. In a moment of compassion, Isabel frees her from the battle, with a promise that Arkarian will protect her from the Order. Ethan successfully defeats Marduke, and the battle ends.

== Reception ==
The Irish Independent compared the book favourably to Curley’s debut novel Old Magic, writing that “once more Marianne Curley pulls off a thrilling, complicated and magical story while keeping a firm grip on the reality of present day life”.

In a positive review, Kirkus wrote that “anguished heartbreak and suppressed longing are bound to continue to spice up the history-hopping sword-and-sorcery, making the sequels an ongoing guilty pleasure”.

Publishers Weekly described the alternating viewpoint structure as “convincing”, and that “readers will likely be swept up by the ever-growing complications and want to return for the series' next installments”.

== See also ==
- Guardians of Time Trilogy
- The Dark
- The Key
- List of Characters
