= The Life Lottery =

2004 novel by Ian Irvine

- The Life Lottery Australian cover
- Author: Ian Irvine
- Language: English
- Series: The Human Rites Trilogy
- Genre: Future eco-thriller
- Publisher: Simon & Schuster Australia
- Publication date: August 2004
- Publication place: Australia
- Media type: Print (Paperback)
- Preceded by: Terminator Gene
- Followed by: -

The Life Lottery by Ian Irvine is a futuristic eco-thriller first published in 2004.

It is the final book in the author's Human Rites Sequence, set after the events in Terminator Gene.

After the books' initial publication in 2004, it was reprinted by Simon and Schuster in Australia in 2010.

== Titles of the Human Rites Sequence ==
- The Last Albatross (November 2000)
- Terminator Gene (April 2003)
- The Life Lottery (August 2004)

== Critical reception ==
Writing in The Sydney Morning Herald reviewer Tim Cadman noted: "Despite its incredibly gloomy theme the book is simply impossible to put down. The pace never slacks off, almost to the point of nervous exhaustion for the reader, since the relentless, action-driven narrative scarcely leaves time even for a coffee break. Besides the morbid attraction of seeing just how bad things can get (and as a scientist, Irvine knows what he's talking about), the addition of satire and farce makes the torment worthwhile."

== Publishers ==
- Simon & Schuster Australia
- Mobipocket

== See also ==
- Clathrate gun hypothesis
