= Bitterbynde =

Book trilogy by Cecilia Dart-Thornton

- The Ill-Made Mute (2001); The Lady of the Sorrows (2002); The Battle of Evernight (2003)
- Author: Cecilia Dart-Thornton
- Country: Australia
- Language: English
- Genre: Fantasy
- Publisher: Warner Books
- Published: 2001–2003
- Media type: Print (hardcover and paperback), audiobook, e-book
- No. of books: 3

The Bitterbynde is a fantasy trilogy written by Australian writer Cecilia Dart-Thornton. It comprises The Ill-Made Mute, The Lady of the Sorrows, and The Battle of Evernight.

== Books ==
=== The Ill-Made Mute ===
The Ill-Made Mute is the first book in the series and was released in June 2001.

In The Ill-Made Mute, the story is about a mute with no memory, eventually named Imrhien, whose face is deformed due to a poisonous plant. The mute is trying to find a cure against the poisoning, a name and lost memory.

=== The Lady of the Sorrows ===
The Lady of the Sorrows is the second installment in the series, released on April 1, 2002.

In The Lady of the Sorrows, the Lady Rohain travels to the royal court, presided over by the King-Emperor James the Sixteenth. The King-Emperor is the Supreme Ruler of the Empire of (The Known Lands of) Erith, which dominates the world, Aia (or as some believe, the southern half. Others think Aia is a half orb because of a barrier called the Ringstorm at the equator).

=== The Battle of Evernight ===
The third and final book, The Battle of Evernight, was released on April 18, 2003.

In The Battle of Evernight, the protagonist, first called Tahquil and later by her real name, Ashalind, sets out to find the gate to a lost "Fair Realm" called Faerie, on the northern half of the world, Aia. However, she is deterred and is taken prisoner by the main antagonist, a Faeren rebel and crown prince named Morragan. It's during this time that Ashalind finds out that James the Sixteenth is dead and that Thorn is actually Angaver, the High King of Faerie and the Faeren, and brother of Morragan, to whom James gave the Empire to until the Prince is old enough to rule. Ashalind is later freed and Morragan killed by Angaver. The Bitterbynde Trilogy ends with Angaver and Ashalinnd going to be wed in Faerie, but being separated by the reincarnated Morragan and one of his followers, Nuckeluvee. seven years later, in the epilogue, Angaver is reunited with Ashalind, who loses her memory again because of a bitterbynde, and the two leave Erith forever as an eagle (Angaver) and a seabird called an elindor (Ashalind).

A 'Bitterbynde' refers to an unbreakable promise or oath.
