= Jennifer Fallon =

Author

Jennifer Fallon (born 1959) is an Australian author of fantasy and science fiction. She is also a businesswoman, trainer and business consultant.

Jennifer has a master's degree from the Creative Arts faculty of QUT. A computer trainer and application specialist in her "day job", Jennifer currently works in the IT industry and spends a month each year working at Scott Base in Antarctica.

== Biography ==
Jennifer Fallon was born in Melbourne, Australia and after living in Central Australia for a number of years, now resides in the South Island of New Zealand. She has sold over 750,000 books world-wide, including three trilogies and one tetralogy.

She is published by Snapping Turtle Books worldwide, in addition to some titles through Voyager Books in Australia, Tor and Random House in the United States, Orbit in the United Kingdom, AST in Russia, Heyne and Egmont in Germany and Luitingh Fantasy in the Netherlands. She has also co-authored a tie-in novel, Stargate SG-1: Roswell.

== Bibliography ==
Note: In the US and Canada, The Demon Child and Hythrun Chronicles have been marketed under the same series, The Hythrun Chronicles.

=== The Demon Child Trilogy ===
1. Medalon (2000)
2. Treason Keep (2001)
3. Harshini (2001)

=== The Second Sons Trilogy ===
1. Lion of Senet (2002)
2. Eye of the Labyrinth (2003)
3. Lord of the Shadows (2003)

=== The Hythrun Chronicles ===
1. Wolfblade (2004)
2. Warrior (2004)
3. Warlord (2005)

=== The Tide Lords ===
1. The Immortal Prince (2007)
2. Gods of Amyrantha (2007)
3. The Palace of Impossible Dreams (2008)
4. The Chaos Crystal (2008)

=== Rift Runners ===
1. The Undivided (2011)
2. Dark Divide (2012)
3. Reunion (2013)

=== Lyre Thief Trilogy ===
1. The Lyre Thief (2016)
2. Retribution (2017)
3. Covenant (2018)
4. Brakandaran the Halfbreed (TBA)

=== Slave Queen Trilogy ===
1. The Slave Queen (TBA)
2. The Pirate Prince (TBA)
3. The Assassin King (TBA)

=== Other ===
- Stargate SG-1: Roswell (2007) (coauthored with Sonny Whitelaw)
- Elezaar's Rules of Faining and Weilding Power (2014)
- First Kill (2016)

=== Short stories ===
Stories are featured in the following anthologies:

- Baggage (2010) edited by Gillian Polack "MacReadie V The Love Machine"
- More Tales of Zorro "Yours and Mine" (2009)
- Australia's Legends of Fantasy (2009) edited by Jack Dann and Jonathan Strahan "The Magic Word"
- Chicks In Capes "Diary of a Superchick" (2010)

== Sources ==
- Jennifer Fallon's Homepage
- Bibliography of works at Fantastic Fiction
