= Janette Turner Hospital =

Australian-born novelist and short story writer

- Born: Janette Turner; 1942 (age 83–84); Melbourne, Victoria, Australia
- Education: University of Queensland; Kelvin Grove Teachers College
- Alma mater: Queen's University at Kingston
- Occupation: Novelist
- Writing career
- Pen name: Alex Juniper
- Language: English
- Years active: 1976–present
- Notable work: Due Preparations for the Plague
- Notable awards: Queensland Premier's Award; 2004 Davitt Award

Janette Turner Hospital (née Turner) (born 1942) is an Australian-born novelist and short story writer who has lived most of her adult life in Canada or the United States, principally Boston, Massachusetts, Kingston, Ontario.and Columbia, South Carolina. She also uses the penname "Alex Juniper".

== Early life and education ==
Turner was born in Melbourne, Australia, on 12 November 1942 and grew up in Queensland. She studied at the University of Queensland and Kelvin Grove Teachers College, gaining a BA degree in 1965. She holds an MA degree from Queen's University, Canada, 1973.

== Career ==
Turner Hospital published her first story in Atlantic Monthly in 1978, and her first novel, The Ivory Swing, in 1982.

She also teaches literature and creative writing and has been writer-in-residence at universities in Australia, Canada, England and the United States (MIT, Boston University, Colgate University and the University of South Carolina).

She visited the Writer-in-Residence in the MFA program at Columbia University in 2010.

She has published six novels as well as three story collections. Her 2003 novel Due Preparations for the Plague received the Queensland Premier's Award for Fiction.

Her books, such as Oyster and Due Preparations for the Plague, are published in multiple translations.

She is known for her penchant for beginning books with intricate riddles, continuing this pattern with her 2014 novel The Claimant, which delves into the complexities of identity, class, and morality against the backdrop of a wealthy Vanderbilt family's fortune.

== Honours and awards ==
Turner Hospital was awarded an honorary D.Litt. from the University of Queensland, Australia, for "services to Australian Literature". She has won a number of international literary awards, including the Steele Rudd Award for Best Collection of Short Stories, 2012. She was also a finalist (one of five) for Prime Minister's Literary Award for Fiction and for the Melbourne Age Book of the Year Award for Fiction.

== Bibliography ==
=== Novels ===
- The Ivory Swing. Hodder & Stoughton. 1982.
- The Tiger in the Tiger Pit (1983)
- Borderline (novel) (1985)
- Charades (novel) (1988)
- A Very Proper Death, as Alex Juniper (1990)
- The Last Magician (1992)
- Oyster (1996)
- Due Preparations for the Plague (2003)
- Orpheus Lost (2007)
- The Claimant (2014)

=== Short story collections ===
- Dislocations (1986)
- Isobars (1990)
- Collected Stories (1995)
- North of Nowhere, South of Loss (2003)
- Forecast : turbulence, Fourth Estate, 2011, ISBN 978-0-7322-9444-1

=== Selected articles ===
- "Missing : in search of missing links". Fryer Folios. 12 (1). University of Queensland Library: 10–21. December 2019.
