= Nada Awar Jarrar =

Lebanese novelist

Nada Awar Jarrar is a Lebanese novelist. Her novel, Somewhere, Home, won the Commonwealth Writers' Prize, Best First Book, South East Asia and South Pacific.

She has lived in London, Paris, Sydney and Washington D.C. She is married; they have a daughter and live in Beirut.

== Works ==
- Somewhere, home, Heinemann, 2003, ISBN 978-0-434-01033-2
- Dreams of Water, Harper, 2007, ISBN 978-0-00-722196-7
- A good land, HarperCollins, 2009, ISBN 978-0-00-722197-4
- An Unsafe Haven, The Borough Press, 2016

== Non-fiction ==
- Henderson, Mark (July 27, 2006). "A family at war". The Times. London.
