= Ian Irvine =

Australian fantasy and eco-thriller author and marine scientist

- Born: 1950 (age 75–76); Bathurst, New South Wales, Australia
- Occupations: Novelist, marine scientist
- Writing career
- Period: 1998 – present
- Genres: Fantasy, futuristic eco-thrillers
- Website: www.ian-irvine.com

Ian Irvine (born 1950) is an Australian fantasy and eco-thriller author and marine scientist. To date Irvine has written 27 novels, including fantasy, eco-thrillers and books for children. He has had books published in at least 12 countries and continues to write full-time.

== Career ==
Irvine was born in Bathurst, New South Wales, Australia, in 1950. He was educated at Chevalier College and the University of Sydney where he received a PhD in marine science, studying the management of contaminated sediments.

Setting up his own environmental consulting firm in 1986, Irvine has worked in many countries in the Asia-Pacific region, including Australia, Indonesia, Singapore, Philippines, South Korea, Papua-New Guinea, Mauritius, Bali, Fiji and Western Samoa. During the course of his career he played a role in developing Australia's national guidelines for protection of the oceanic environment and still works in this field. He was the principal author of Australia's National Environmental Assessment Guidelines for Dredging, 2009.

During 1987 Irvine began writing the first in his The View from the Mirror series. He continued working full-time as an environmental scientist and so wrote the series in his spare time. The first book in the series was published in 1998 and since this time Irvine has been a full-time author, although he still undertakes some environmental consulting work when he has time.

Irvine is married with four grown-up children and lives in the mountains of northern New South Wales.

== Writing ==
Thus far, Irvine has written 27 novels, including fantasy, eco-thrillers and books for children. He has had books published in Australia, the United States, the United Kingdom, Germany, Russia, Netherlands, Bulgaria, Greece, Poland, Czech Republic, Turkey and South Korea.

=== Books for older readers ===
==== Three Worlds Cycle series ====
Irvine's most popular series is the Three Worlds fantasy series, comprising The View from the Mirror, The Well of Echoes and The Song of the Tears and selling over a million copies worldwide. The series comprises eleven currently published books set on the three linked worlds of Santhenar, Aachan and Tallallame. The cycle details the struggle for survival between four human species: old humans, Aachim, Faellem and Charon. The View from the Mirror series has also been published in audiobook format.

A complete list of books in the Three Worlds Cycle series is:

- The View from the Mirror Quartet
  - A Shadow on the Glass (1998)
  - The Tower on the Rift (1998)
  - Dark is the Moon (1999)
  - The Way Between the Worlds (1999)
- The Well of Echoes Quartet
  - Geomancer (2001)
  - Tetrarch (2002)
  - Scrutator / Alchymist (UK title) (2003)
  - Chimaera (2004)
- The Song of the Tears Trilogy
  - Torments of the Traitor / The Fate of the Fallen (UK title) (2006)
  - The Curse on the Chosen (2007)
  - The Destiny of the Dead (January 2008)
- Short Stories Collection
  - A Wizard's War and Other Stories (2015)
- The Gates of Good and Evil Quartet
  - The Summon Stone (2016)
  - The Fatal Gate (2017)
  - The Perilous Tower (2020)
  - The Sapphire Portal (2020)

==== Other books for adults ====
Irvine's eco-thriller trilogy The Human Rites Trilogy, comprising The Last Albatross, Terminator Gene, and The Life Lottery, explores a world undergoing catastrophic climate change. They are set a little way in Earth's future and shows the impact climate change is having on politics, the economy and life in general. The series was originally published between 2000 and 2003, and many of the events described in the books (such as the destruction of New Orleans by a huge hurricane) have since come true. A revised and updated edition of the Human Rites trilogy was published in Australia between 2008 and 2010.

Irvine has written two novellas. Poisoned Chalice was published in Mystery, Magic, Voodoo and the Holy Grail (2000), and Tribute to Hell was published in Legends of Australian Fantasy in 2010.

In addition to fantasy fiction Irvine has also written a number of other works including The Truth About Publishing and The Art and Science of Book Promotion which both 'tell it like it is' about being a successful author.

=== Books for children ===
Irvine published 11 books for adults before he began his first children's series, Runcible Jones, in 2006. The series comprises four books (Runcible Jones: The Gate to Nowhere (2006), Runcible Jones: The Buried City (2007), Runcible Jones: The Frozen Compass (2008), and Runcible Jones: The Backwards Hourglass (2010)) for children aged 10 and up. His second children's series, The Sorcerer's Tower, is a quartet of short books for younger readers (from around eight years and up) and was published in 2008 and illustrated in black and white by Australian artist and fantasy novelist D. M. Cornish. The first book in the series is Thorn Castle. This was followed by the Grim and Grimmer quartet of humorous fantasy novels (2010 and 2011).

Many of Irvine's books (for both children and adults) are now available as ebooks.

Irvine has also produced "book trailers" (similar to movie trailers) for a number of his children's and adults books and has placed them on YouTube.

== Awards, honourable mentions, listings ==
- A Shadow on the Glass. Shortlisted for the Aurealis Award, best fantasy novel (1998). Listed in ScienceFiction.com's Best of 2001 (US edition).
- The Tower on the Rift. Listed in Sydney Morning Herald's Best Books of 1998. Listed in ScienceFiction.com’s Best of 2001 (US edition).
- The Last Albatross. Listed in The Australian's Best of Summer Reading (2000).
- Terminator Gene. Shortlisted for the Aurealis Award, best SF Novel (2003).
- Scrutator. Honourable Mention, Aurealis Award, best fantasy novel (2003). Listed in the Sydney Morning Herald's Best Books of 2003.
- Chimaera. Listed in the Sydney Morning Herald's Best Books of 2004.
- The Art & Science of Book Promotion. Chapter, The Art & Science of Book Promotion in The Complete Guide to Writing Science Fiction, Dragon Moon Press, Canada, 2007. Winner of the 2007 Eppie Award, best non-fiction book.
- The Sorcerer's Tower. Shortlisted for the 2008 Aurealis Award for best children's novel.

== Interviews ==
- Interview on wotmania.com
- Interview at SFFWorld.com
- interview conducted by Nalini Haynes of Dark Matter Zine, October 2011
