= Nikki Gemmell =

Australian writer

- Born: 17 November 1966; Wollongong, New South Wales, Australia
- Occupation: Novelist

Nikki Gemmell (born 17 November 1966) is an Australian novelist and journalist. She is also a cultural commentator, and since 2026 the chief film critic for The Australian. She resides in Sydney, Australia.

== Education ==
Gemmell was born in Wollongong, New South Wales, and attended Kincoppal-Rose Bay school, Sydney, on a scholarship. She graduated from the University of Technology Sydney with a master's degree in writing.

== Career ==
=== Journalism ===
Gemmell began her career as a radio journalist for ABC Radio and the BBC World Service.

For 14 years, she wrote a weekly column for The Weekend Australian, which earned her the 2022 Walkley Award for commentary, analysis, opinion, and critique.

In January 2026, Gemmell concluded her tenure as a columnist to take on the role of chief film critic for The Australian.

=== Books ===
Gemmell is the author of fourteen works of fiction and seven non-fiction books.

Her best-known work is the 2003 novel The Bride Stripped Bare, an explicit exploration of female sexuality originally published anonymously. Gemmell was identified publicly as the author before publication. The book went on to become a worldwide publishing sensation and the best-selling book by an Australian author in 2003. In 2022, it was named as one of the 25 best Australian novels of the past 25 years.

In 1999 Cleave was shortlisted in the Fiction category of the Queensland Premier's Literary Awards. Four books by Gemmell, Shiver, Cleave, The Bride Stripped Bare and The Book of Rapture, made the longlist of "Favourite Australian Novels" as chosen by readers of the Australian Book Review.

She has also published two series of books for children. One of these, The Kensington Reptilarium, was shortlisted for an Australian Book Industry Award in the category of Book of the Year for Older Children.

Gemmell's writing often utilises a second-person narrative, a style that has garnered both critical and popular acclaim. In 2007, the French literary magazine Lire included her in its list of the fifty most important writers in the world – those it believed would have a significant influence on the literature of the 21st century. In France she has also been described as a "female Jack Kerouac".

=== Screenwriting ===
In 2025, Gemmell's debut novel, Shiver (1997), was greenlit for a major feature film adaptation. Co-written by Gemmell and director Robert Connolly, the screenplay is a contemporary retelling of her semi-autobiographical account of a journalist on an Antarctic expedition.

== Bibliography ==
=== Adult novels ===
- Shiver (1997)
- Cleave (1998); published as Alice Springs in the United States (1999)
- Lovesong (2002)
- The Bride Stripped Bare (2003)
- The Book of Rapture (2009)
- With My Body (2011)
- I Take You (2013)
- The Ripping Tree (2021)
- Wing (2024)

=== For children ===
- The Luna Laboratorium (2015)
- The Icicle Illuminarium (2013)
- The Kensington Reptilarium (2013)
- Coco Banjo and the Super Wow Surprise (2016)
- Coco Banjo Has Been Unfriended (2015)
- Coco Banjo is Having a Yay Day (2015)

=== Non fiction ===
- Why You Are Australian – A Letter to My Children (2009)
- Pleasure: An Almanac of the Heart (2006), published as Plaisir : Un florilège du coeur in France (2011)
- Honestly – Notes on Life (2012)
- Personally – Further Notes on Life (2013)
- After (2017; written in response to her mother's suicide)
- On Quiet (2018)
- Dissolve (2021)

=== Anthologies ===
- Desire (Head of Zeus, 2016) Ed. Mariella Frostrup
- Just Between Us: Australian Writers Tell The Truth About Female Friendship (Pan Macmillan Australia, 2013) Ed. Maya Linden, Christie Nieman, Maggie Scott, Natalie Kon-Yu, Miriam Sved
- Better than Fiction: True Travel Tales from Great Fiction Writers (Lonely Planet, 2012) Ed. Don George
- The Divided Heart: Art and Motherhood (Red Dog Books, 2012) Ed. Rachel Power
- Inside Notting Hill (Umbrella Books, 2007). Ed. Miranda Davies, Sarah Anderson
- Some Girls Do ... My Life as a Teenager (Arena, 2006) Ed. Jacinta Tynan
- Come Away With Me (Bantam, 2004) Ed. Sarah Macdonald
- Writers on Writing (Penguin Books Australia, 2004). Ed. Roberts, Barry Mitchell, Roger Zubrinich
- Australian Expats: Stories from Abroad (Global Exchange, 2003) Ed. Bryan Havenhand, Anne MacGregor
- Gas and Air: Tales of Pregnancy, Birth and Beyond (Bloomsbury UK, 2002). Ed. Jill Dawson, Margo Daly
- Neverland: What Australia Might Have Been (Pluto Press, 2002). Ed. Kevin Murray
- My One True Love (Random House Australia, 2000). Ed. Caro Llewellyn
- Australian Summer Stories (Penguin Australia, 1999)
- Partners (HarperCollins Australia, 1999). Ed. Ross Fitzgerald, Anne Henderson
