= Cecilia Dart-Thornton =

Australian writer (born 1961)

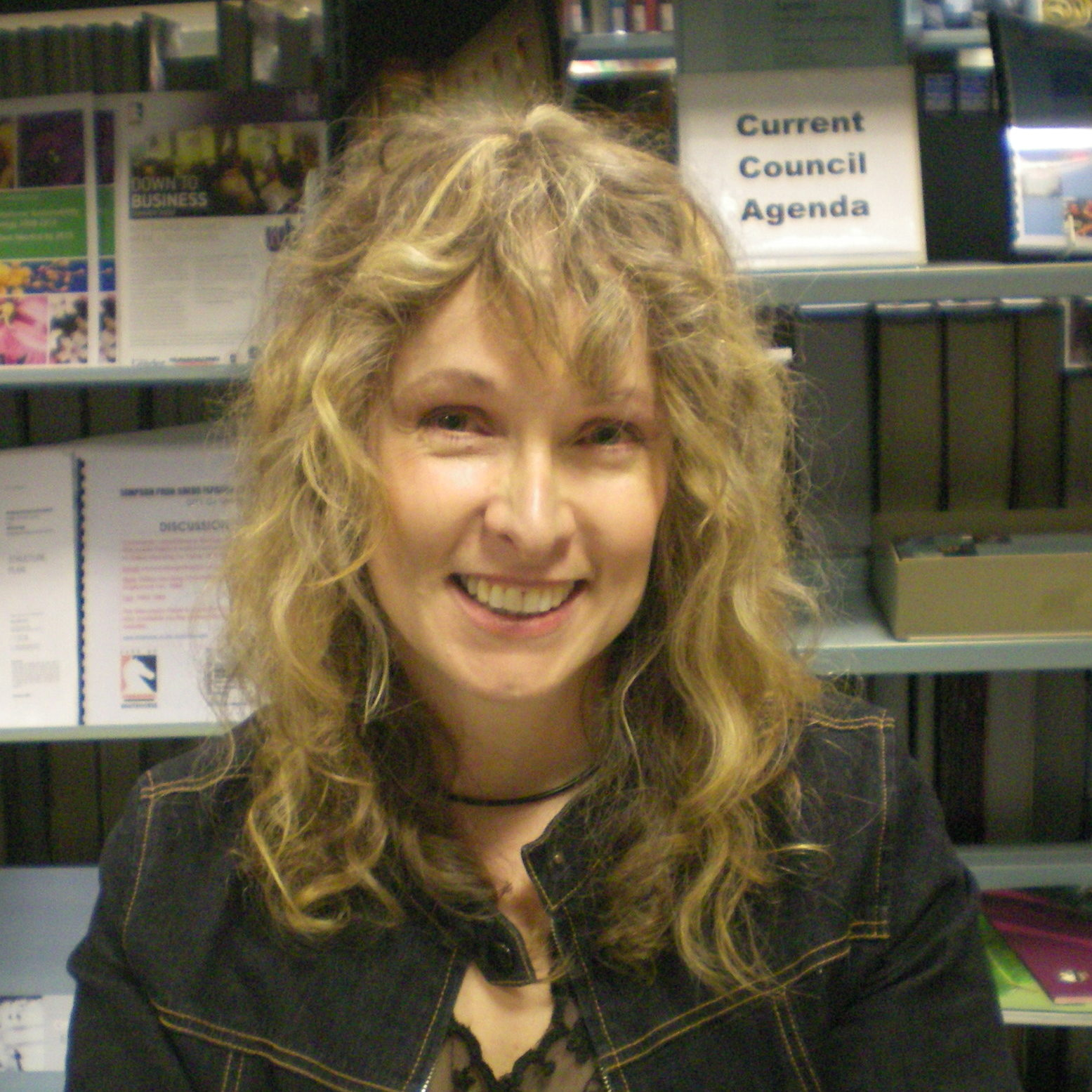
- Cecilia Dart-Thornton (2009)
- Born: Melbourne, Australia
- Writing career
- Genre: Fantasy
- Website: dartthornton.com

Cecilia Dart-Thornton (born 1961) is an Australian author of fantasy novels, notably the Bitterbynde Trilogy.

Dart-Thornton was educated at Monash University where she completed a Bachelor of Arts, majoring in sociology.

== Published works ==
=== The Bitterbynde Trilogy ===
The Bitterbynde Trilogy follows the journey of a mute, amnesiac foundling through a world of beauty and peril.

1. The Ill-Made Mute (2001)
2. The Lady of the Sorrows (2002)
3. The Battle of Evernight (2003)

=== The Crowthistle Chronicles ===
A four-part epic fantasy describing the adventures that befall a cursed and gifted family.

1. The Iron Tree (2005)
2. The Well of Tears (2005)
3. Weatherwitch (2006)
4. Fallowblade (2007)

=== Other works ===
==== Short stories ====
1. Long the Clouds Are Over Me Tonight (Published in the anthology Emerald Magic: Great Tales of Irish Fantasy; Tor Books, 2004)
2. The Stolen Swanmaiden (Published in Australian Women's Weekly, September 2005)
3. The Lanes of Camberwell (Published by HarperCollins in the anthology Dreaming Again, 2008)
4. The Enchanted (Published by HarperCollins in the anthology Legends of Australian Fantasy, 2010)
