= How to Make a Bird =

2003 children's novel by Martine Murray

- First edition cover
- Author: Martine Murray
- Publisher: Levine/Scholastic
- Publication date: June 1, 2010
- ISBN: 978-0-439-66951-1

How to Make a Bird is a 2003 children's novel by Australian author Martine Murray about a young adolescent girl called Mannie. Mannie has faced a myriad of losses and challenges throughout her short life. Little by little, she begins to question her identity. In order to escape insecurities about who she is, Mannie embarks on a journey of self-discovery, enlightenment and acceptance.

How to Make a Bird won the 2004 Queensland Premier's Literary Award in the young adult category in 2004.

== Setting ==
How to Make a Bird is set primarily in a small country town somewhere near Castlemaine and Harcourt in Victoria. The other main setting is Melbourne, where Mannie goes when she runs away.
