= The Dark (Curley novel) =

2003 novel by Marianne Curley

- The cover
- Author: Marianne Curley
- Language: English
- Series: Guardians of Time Trilogy
- Genre: Science fiction, Fantasy
- Publication date: 2003
- Publication place: Australia
- Pages: 336 (US edition)
- ISBN: 0-7475-7433-2
- OCLC: 57063653
- Preceded by: The Named
- Followed by: The Key

The Dark is a 2003 fantasy novel written by Marianne Curley. It is the second book in the Guardians of Time Trilogy.

== Narration ==
As with all of the Guardians of Time books, the prologue is written in the third person, while all the chapters are written in first person switching points of view between two narrators. In this book, the two narrators are Isabel and Arkarian.

== Setting ==
The story is set in Angel Falls which is located above the ancient city of Veridian.

The story is set in the present or near-present time. Some of the story takes place in the past, in a variety of times/places. It also takes place in the Underworld.

== Plot summary ==
Arkarian is kidnapped by the Order of Chaos, who plan to weaken the Guard by erasing his birth. Isabel is determined to save him, but that means defying Lorian's orders, risking her life, and facing the underworld itself. Going through many hardships in the underworld with her friend Ethan, and brother Matt. They meet a new friend along the way ( John Wren ) but also rescuing Ethan's sister who was killed when he was a boy ( she is a ghost/spirit ) - ( a wren is a birdlike creature but still has somewhat the appearance of a human ). When rescuing Arkarian, they gain another member of the guard Dillon who was working for the Order of Chaos but came to the good side. Arkarian and Isabel realise they love each other and Arkarian saves them by opening a rift. When they return Lorian summons Isabel to a hearing and Arkarian pleads for her life and finds out Lorian is his father. At the hearing Isabel is pardoned and Lorian grants her the power to cease ageing so she and Arkarian can be together.

== Reception ==
Kirkus Reviews described this book in their review as "Pure soap-opera fluff with only the lightest sprinkling of the fantastic".

Susan L. Rogers was mixed in her review for School Library Journal saying "There is enough action and excitement here to keep non-discriminating readers involved, but little else."

== See also ==
- The Named
- The Key
