= Anthony O'Neill =

Australian writer

Anthony O'Neill is an Australian fiction novelist.

== Early life ==
O'Neill was born in Melbourne in 1964. His father was a policeman and his mother, from whom he inherited a 'rich strain of Scottish blood', was a stenographer. Educated at the Christian Brothers College in St Kilda, he went straight into the workforce after school and devoted himself to his passion, writing. O'Neill has described his journey to publication as 'unspeakably long'.

== Writing and film career ==
In October 2014, 20th Century Fox preemptively purchased the film rights to his unpublished science fiction novel The Dark Side. The book was acquired for publication by Simon & Schuster at the Frankfurt Book Fair, and was published in 2016.

== Personal life ==
O'Neill has lived now for a number of years in Edinburgh which he has called 'a deliriously atmospheric city - for me the most stimulating in the world.'

== Works ==
- SCHEHERAZADE
- THE LAMPLIGHTER
- THE EMPIRE OF ETERNITY
- THE UNSCRATCHABLES (as Cornelius Kane)
- THE DARK SIDE
- DR. JEKYLL & MR. SEEK
- THE DEVIL UPSTAIRS
- CIRCUS MAXIMUS (as A.D. O'Neill)
