= Terminator Gene =

2003 novel by Ian Irvine

- Author: Ian Irvine
- Series: The Human Rites Trilogy
- Genre: Future eco-thriller
- Publisher: Simon & Schuster Australia
- Publication date: April 2003; September 2009
- Publication place: Australia
- Media type: Paperback
- Preceded by: The Last Albatross
- Followed by: The Life Lottery

Terminator Gene is the second book in Ian Irvine's Eco-thriller titles. Set after The Last Albatross, this is the story of Jemma Hardey's daughter. This book is due to be re-released as a revised edition in September 2009. The ePub version of the eBook is available to download for free on Ian Irvine's website. It is also available on the Amazon Kindle, but is not free.

== Characters ==
- Jemma Hardey - Now at the age of 55, and is a widow after Ryn's death, mother to Irith Hardey. She is being hunted for revenge by Ulf Barmet.
- Irith Hardey - Small, like her mother and has slightly frizzy pale brown hair. She has brown eyes, and is a striking woman, though timid and well brought up to be conservative. She is a great rifle shooter and is the heroine of the story.
- Levi Seth - Now in his 50s, he wears glasses, is slim, dark-skinned. He has a bald skull rimmed with fluffy grey hair and kind eyes. He has an Indian appearance but no apparent accent, and a firm handshake. He is very good at security, and is the main character in helping the team succeed.
- Bragg - Takes Irith to London, is part of Levi's team.
- Thornton - Twin to Gretel, is sexually attractive (and knows how to get what he wants), a control freak and "the explosives guy" in Levi Seth's team.
- Gretel - A tall attractive woman, with a luscious figure, not much over 20. She has jet black hair to midway down her back. She is twin to Thornton and with a fiery temper is very protective to her twin.
- Siah - Gives Levi's team a place to stay, which gets burnt down. Has family in the New Orleans.
- Ulf Bamert - President of the Global Congress and is the villain.
- Hercus Barges - Deceased character from The Last Albatross.
- James Barchitt - Director of Security at the office in London. He is condescending, has "meaty hands" and is a pervert.

== Titles of the Human Rites Sequence ==
- The Last Albatross (November 2000)
- Terminator Gene (April 2003)
- The Life Lottery (August 2004)

== Publishers ==
- Simon & Schuster Australia
- Mobipocket
