= Treason Keep =

2001 novel by Jennifer Fallon

Treason keep
- Treason Keep first edition cover.
- Author: Jennifer Fallon
- Language: English
- Series: The Demon Child
- Genre: Fantasy
- Publisher: HarperCollins
- Publication date: 24 January 2001
- Publication place: Australia
- Media type: Print (Paperback & Hardback)
- Pages: 674 (first edition)
- ISBN: 0-7322-6621-1
- Preceded by: Medalon
- Followed by: Harshini

Treason Keep is a fantasy novel written by Australian author Jennifer Fallon. It is the second in The Demon Child trilogy; the other two are Medalon and Harshini.
