= Martine Murray =

Australian author and illustrator

- Born: 1965 (age 60–61)
- Occupations: Author; Illustrator
- Writing career
- Years active: 2000–present
- Genres: Children's literature Young adult fiction
- Notable works: How to Make a Bird; The Slightly True Story of Cedar B. Hartley
- Notable awards: Queensland Premier's Literary Awards – Young Adult (2004); Queensland Premier's Literary Awards – Children's Book (2006)

Martine Murray (born 1965) is an Australian author and illustrator residing in Melbourne. She has written many critically acclaimed books, including How to Make a Bird, winner of the Queensland Premier's Literary Awards Young Adult award in 2004, and The Slightly True Story of Cedar B. Hartley, winner of the Queensland Premier's Literary Awards Children's Book award in 2006.

She has studied filmmaking at Prahran College, art at the Victorian College of the Arts and Movement & Dance at Melbourne University. She has formed a dance theatre company called Bird on a Wire, and recently received Arts Victoria funding to develop and perform a full-length work, as part of Melbourne's Next Wave Festival. She also teaches yoga and has been involved in community circus.

Martine is enrolled in Professional Writing at RMIT and plans further study in screen writing and short story.

Martine is the subject of The Whitlams' 1997 song 'Melbourne'. She calls her dog 'The Bear'.

== Books ==
- A Dog Called Bear, Random House Australia, 2000 ISBN 0091838711
- A Moose Called Mouse, Allen & Unwin, 2001 ISBN 978-1-86508-494-7
- How to Make a Bird, Allen & Unwin, 2003 ISBN 1-74114-109-5
- Mannie and the Long Brave Day, with Sally Rippin, Allen & Unwin, 2009, ISBN 9781741758863
- Molly and Pim and the Millions of Stars, Text Publishing, 2015, ISBN 9781925240085
- Marsh and Me, Text Publishing, 2017, ISBN 9781925498011
- The Last Summer of Ada Bloom, Text Publishing, 2018 ISBN 9781925498714

=== Cedar B. Hartley series ===
- The Slightly True Story of Cedar B. Hartley (Who Planned to Live an Unusual Life), Allen & Unwin, 2002 ISBN 978-0-439-48623-1
- The Slightly Bruised Glory of Cedar B. Hartley (Who Can't Help Flying High and Falling in Deep), Allen & Unwin, 2005 ISBN 1-74114-711-5

=== Henrietta series ===
- Henrietta: There's No One Better, Allen & Unwin, 2004 ISBN 1-74114-436-1
- Henrietta the Great Go-Getter, Allen & Unwin, 2006 ISBN 9781741149296
- Henrietta Gets a Letter, Allen & Unwin, 2008 ISBN 9781741754513
- Henrietta and the Perfect Night, Allen & Unwin, 2017 ISBN 9781760290245
- Henrietta the Greatest Go-Getter, Allen & Unwin, 2017 ISBN 9781760112417 (compilation)

== Awards ==
The Slightly True Story of Cedar B. Hartley was shortlisted for the CBC's young readers category in 2003. How to Make a Bird won the Young Adult Book Award at the 2004 Queensland Premier's Literary Awards.
