= Eye of the Labyrinth =

2003 fantasy novel by Jennifer Fallon

- Eye of the Labyrinth first edition cover.
- Author: Jennifer Fallon
- Language: English
- Series: Second Sons
- Genre: Fantasy
- Publisher: HarperCollins
- Publication date: 26 February 2003
- Publication place: Australia
- Media type: Print (Paperback)
- Pages: 628 (first edition)
- ISBN: 0-7322-7513-X
- Preceded by: Lion of Senet
- Followed by: Lord of the Shadows

Eye of the Labyrinth is a 2003 fantasy novel written by Australian author Jennifer Fallon. It is the second in The Second Sons trilogy.

== Plot summary ==
This novel picks up two years after the events of the previous one, with Dirk fleeing Avacas a wanted man and seeking sanctuary in the Baenlands. Obsessed with Dirk's capture Antonov arrests Morna Provin at her husband's funeral and announces that he will have her burned at the stake come Landfall. Despite the best efforts of Tia and Reithan Dirk still finds out and demands that they attempt to save her. The other major plot follows the domestic quarrels of Alenor and Kirsh, who is still besotted with the acrobat Marquel. At Dirk's suggestion, Alenor invites Marquel to Kalarada willingly in the hope that keeping Kirsh distracted will give her some measure of control over her kingdom. Arriving on Elcast too late, Dirk has only time to beg Tia to end his mother's suffering. She refuses at first, but forced to listen to Morna's screams, Tia relents and shoots the former duchess through the eye, ending her pain. The two escape with Master Helgrin and row back to the Wanderer, watching as Reithan Seranov's diversion burns Antonov's flagship to the waterline in retribution. Tired of running, Dirk announces that night that he is going to Omaxin in an attempt to break through the labyrinth and discover the truth that sent Neris Veran into madness. The strain of her husband openly flaunting a mistress takes its toll on Alenor and her relationship with Kirsh grows fractious. She eventually begins an affair with the captain of her guard.

== Critical reception ==
Writing for January magazine Sue Bursztynski wrote that with this series Fallon "has created yet another world with its own politics and culture. This is science fiction posing as fantasy. The cover blurb compares Fallon to George R.R. Martin and Guy Gavriel Kay and this is not a bad comparison."

== Publication history ==
After the novel's initial publication in Australia in HarperCollins, the novel was reprinted as follows:

- 2004, Bantam Books, USA
- 2005, Orbit, UK
- 2010, Harpercollins, Australia

== Notes ==
- Dedication: For TJ, and as always, Adele Robinson.
- Epigraph: There was a door to which I found no key: There was a veil past which I could not see .. The Rubaiyat of Omar Khayyam (translation by Edward J. Fitzgerald, 1859).
