= Marianne Curley =

Australian author

- Born: 20 May 1959 (age 67); Windsor, New South Wales, Australia
- Occupation: Novelist
- Writing career
- Genre: Fantasy/Historical
- Subject: Fantasy
- Website: www.mariannecurley7.com

Marianne Curley (born 20 May 1959) is an Australian author best known for her Guardians of Time Trilogy and Old Magic books.

== Life ==
According to her official biography, Marianne Curley formerly lived in Coffs Harbour, on the Mid North Coast of New South Wales (Australia). She is married with three children.

In 2004, Curley battled Myeliofibrosis also known as bone marrow cancer. Curley received a life saving stem-cell bone marrow transplant from her sister.

== Bibliography ==
- Old Magic
- Guardians of Time Trilogy
  - The Named
  - The Dark
  - The Key
  - The Shadow
- The Avena Trilogy
  - Hidden
  - Broken
  - Fearless
- Kids' Night in: Anthology (short story)

== See also ==
- Guardians of Time Trilogy
