= Laurie Duggan =

Australian poet, editor, and translator

Laurence James Duggan (born 1949), known as Laurie Duggan, is an Australian poet, editor, and translator.

== Life ==
Laurie Duggan was born in Melbourne and attended Monash University, where his friends included the poets Alan Wearne and John A. Scott. Both he and Scott won the Poetry Society of Australia Prize (Scott 1970, Duggan 1971). He moved to Sydney in 1972 and became involved with the poetry scene there, in particular with John Tranter, John Forbes, Ken Bolton and Pam Brown. Duggan lectured at Swinburne College ( 1976) and Canberra College of Advanced Education (1983).

His poetry grew out of contemplation of moments and found texts. His interest in bricolage started early: while still at Monash he was working on a series of 'Merz poems', short poems about discarded objects, inspired by the work of Kurt Schwitters. His book-length poem The Ash Range (1987) uses diaries, journals of pioneers, and newspaper articles in its construction of a history of Gippsland.

== Awards ==
- 1971 – Poetry Society of Australia Award for the poem East.
- 1976 – Anne Elder Poetry Award for East: Poems 1970-1974.
- 1988 – Victorian Premier's Award for The Ash Range.
- 1989 – Wesley Michel Wright Prize for The Epigrams of Martial.
- 2003 – The Age Poetry Book of the Year for Mangroves.
- 2004 – ALS Gold Medal for Mangroves.
- 2007 – Queensland Premier's Literary Awards, Poetry Collection – Arts Queensland Judith Wright Calanthe Award for The Passenger.
- 2012 – Grace Leven Prize for Poetry for The Collected Blue Hills.

== Bibliography ==
=== Poetry ===
==== Collections ====
- —— (1976). East: Poems 1970–74. Rigmarole of the Hours.
- —— (1978). Under the Weather. Wild & Woolley.
- —— (1982). Adventures in Paradise.
- —— (1985). The Great Divide: Poems 1973–83. Hale & Iremonger.
- —— (1987). The Ash Range. Picador.
- —— (1989). Two Epigrams from Martial. Catnip Press.
- —— (1989). All Blues: Eight Poems. Northern Lights.
- —— (1990). Blue Notes. Picador. ISBN 9780330271929.
- —— (1991). The Home Paddock: Blue Hills 21-35. Noone's Press.
- —— (1996). New and Selected Poems 1971–1993. University of Queensland Press. ISBN 9780702226243.
- —— (2003). Mangroves. University of Queensland Press. ISBN 9780702233517.
- —— (2003). Compared to What: Selected Poems 1971–2003. Shearsman. ISBN 9780907562610.
- —— (2005). Let's Get Lost. Vagabond Press.
- —— (2006). The Passenger. University of Queensland Press. ISBN 9780702235559.
- —— (2011). Allotments. Fewer and Fewer Press.
- —— (2012). Catnips. Donnithorne Street Press.
- —— (2012). The Pursuit of Happiness. Shearsman Books.
- —— (2012). Leaving Here. light-trap press.
- —— (2012). The Collected Blue Hills. Puncher & Wattmann.
- —— (2014). East & Under the Weather. Puncher & Wattmann.
- —— (2018). Selected Poems 1971–2017. Shearsman Books. ISBN 9781848615731.
- —— (2018). Afterimages. Polar Bear.
- —— (2020). Homer Street. Giramondo. ISBN 9781925818468.

==== List of poems ====
Title	Year	First published	Reprinted/collected
An ordinary evening in Newtown	2013	"An ordinary evening in Newtown". Australian Book Review. 350: 58. April 2013.	

=== Non-fiction ===
- Ghost Nation:Imagined Space and Aust Visual Culture 1901-1939 (UQP, 2001) ISBN 978-0-7022-3189-6

=== Translations ===
- The Epigrams of Martial (Pressed Wafer, 2010) ISBN 978-0-9824100-7-3
