= The Battle of Evernight =

Book by Cecilia Thornton

- First edition hardback frontcover
- Author: Cecilia Dart-Thornton
- Cover artist: Paul Gregory
- Language: English
- Series: Bitterbynde
- Genre: Fantasy novel
- Publisher: Warner Aspect, a division of Time Warner U.S.A.
- Publication date: 1 Aug 2003
- Publication place: Australia
- Media type: Print (Hardback & Paperback)
- Pages: 480 pp (first edition, hardback)
- ISBN: 0-333-90757-4
- OCLC: 52325021
- Preceded by: The Lady of Sorrows
- Followed by: –

The Battle of Evernight is a fantasy novel written by Australian author Cecilia Dart-Thornton, published in 2003 by Warner Aspect. It is the third and final novel in the Bitterbynde trilogy and the sequel to The Lady of Sorrows.

== Plot summary ==
The war, detailed in the previous books in the trilogy, continues between the immortals High King Angavar and Prince Morragan. Unable to return to the Fair Realm until they find the last remaining gate, the protagonist, Tahquil, along with her friends Caitri and Viviana, vow to find the gate and return to their homeland.

== Critical reception ==
Publishers Weekly called this novel a "strong conclusion" to the trilogy. They also noted: "Those who esteem the Irish and Scottish myths of faerie folk will be delighted by the magic folklore and tales within tales that fill the book. Those looking for straightforward fantasy adventure, however, may be disappointed."

Kirkus Reviews also thought it would appeal to the author's readers: "Beneath the padding, overblown prose, and interminable description, a genuinely moving tragedy sometimes glimmers through. Would that Dart-Thornton had simply let her characters find their way. Still, fans of the previous shouldn't be disappointed."
