= The Bride Stripped Bare (novel) =

2003 novel by Nikki Gemmell

- Author: Nikki Gemmell
- Publisher: Fourth Estate
- Publication date: 2003
- ISBN: 978-0-007-16353-3

The Bride Stripped Bare is a 2003 novel by the Australian writer Nikki Gemmell, originally published anonymously. The title is borrowed from the painting The Bride Stripped Bare by Her Bachelors, Even (also known as The Large Glass) by Marcel Duchamp. It went on to become the best-selling book by an Australian author in 2003.

In 2005, it was announced that Australian screenwriter Andrew Bovell, who penned the award-winning film drama, Lantana, was to adapt The Bride Stripped Bare for the screen.

The book is written in the form of a diary by a young wife who has disappeared. In it, the author talks frankly about oral sex and love, and chronicles her relationship with a mysterious man she meets at a library group.

The author has said that she "loved the idea of writing a book that dived under the surface of a woman's life, a seemingly contentedly married woman, and explored her secret world - with ruthless honesty". The act of writing the work anonymously she has described as "liberating".

A follow-up novel entitled With My Body was published in Australia and the UK in October 2011 and was scheduled to be published in the United States in 2012. According to the publisher, it is a companion piece but not explicitly a sequel to The Bride Stripped Bare.
