= Harshini =

2001 novel by Jennifer Fallon

- Harshini first edition cover
- Author: Jennifer Fallon
- Language: English
- Series: The Demon Child
- Genre: Fantasy
- Publisher: HarperCollins
- Publication date: September 26, 2001
- Publication place: Australia
- Media type: Print (Paperback & Hardback)
- Pages: 648 (first edition)
- ISBN: 0-7322-6613-0
- Preceded by: Treason Keep

Harshini is a fantasy novel written by Australian author Jennifer Fallon. It is the third in The Demon Child trilogy.
