= Mangroves (poetry collection) =

2003 book of poetry by Laurie Duggan

- Author: Laurie Duggan
- Language: English
- Genre: poetry
- Publisher: University of Queensland Press
- Publication date: 2003
- Media type: Print
- Pages: 186 pp
- ISBN: 978-0-7022-3351-7
- Preceded by: Laurie Duggan: Selected Poems 1971-1993
- Followed by: Compared to What: Selected Poems 1971-2003

Mangroves (2003) is a collection of poetry by Australian poet Laurie Duggan. It won the ALS Gold Medal in 2004.

The collection consists of 74 poems, some previously published and some published for the first time in this volume.

The poems in this collections are grouped into two main sections: Part I Mangroves (2000-2002) and Part II The Night Watch (1988-1994). An author's note (p.ix) explains the significance of this grouping.

== Contents ==
- "Blue Hills 45"
- "Blue Hills 46"
- "Blue Hills 47"
- "Blue Hills 48"
- "Blue Hills 49"
- "Blue Hills 50"
- "Blue Hills 51"
- "No Name"
- "Election Day"
- "The Submerged Cathedral"
- "At Three in the Afternoon"
- "Air Time"
- "Die Welt uber dem Wasserspiegel"
- "August 7th"
- "Little History"
- "November 11th"
- "Rapture"
- "Difference and Repetition"
- "Louvres"
- "Composizione (1914)"
- "The Day 'The Don' Died"
- "Sites"
- "In Memory of the Academic Poem"
- "Art"
- "Music"
- "Lines for a Reading"
- "Florida"
- "The Last Days of Deja Vu"
- "Blue Skies"
- "The Inner Western Dreaming"
- "Blue Hills 24"
- "Blue Hills 25"
- "Blue Hills 26"
- "Blue Hills 27"
- "Blue Hills 28"
- "Blue Hills 29"
- "Blue Hills 30"
- "Blue Hills 31"
- "Blue Hills 32"
- "Blue Hills 33"
- "Blue Hills 34"
- "Blue Hills 35"
- "The Resident"
- "Homage to the 'Charm' School"
- "Compared to What"
- "66 Tears"
- "Judder Bars"
- "Themes for Painting"
- "Comparative Atmospherics"
- "Harlem Nocturne"
- "Across 110th Street"
- "West"
- "At Jonathan and Tom's"
- "Rainbow" by Ardengo Soffici, Laurie Duggan (translator)
- "Florence" by Ardengo Soffici, Laurie Duggan (translator)
- "Morning" by Ardengo Soffici, Laurie Duggan (translator)
- "Studio" by Ardengo Soffici, Laurie Duggan (translator)
- "Boredom" by Ardengo Soffici, Laurie Duggan (translator)
- "Crossroads" by Ardengo Soffici, Laurie Duggan (translator)
- "Cafe Paszkowski" by Ardengo Soffici, Laurie Duggan (translator)
- "Currents" by Ardengo Soffici, Laurie Duggan (translator)
- "Aeroplane" by Ardengo Soffici, Laurie Duggan (translator)
- "Field Hospital 026" by Ardengo Soffici, Laurie Duggan (translator)
- "Pet Cemetery"
- "Blue Hills 36"
- "Blue Hills 37"
- "Blue Hills 38"
- "Blue Hills 39"
- "Blue Hills 40"
- "Blue Hills 41"
- "Blue Hills 42"
- "Blue Hills 43'
- "Blue Hills 44"
- "The Minutes"

== Reviews ==
Writing in Jacket magazine Angela Rockel concluded: "The structure of this collection invites a spiral of readings in which earlier poems are re-experienced in the light of later work, and later work is understood differently in relation to its origins in earlier patterns. Rather than pro- or regression, the shift that occurs in the space between Part II and Part I is imaged as a change in location, and, as for the costumed figures of The Night Watch in the photograph, nothing has changed/ everything has changed. Having found and lost and found again the foothold of writing, Duggan creates a poetic that first of all acknowledges the mutability of things, and within that understanding, asks how dwelling can be found."

David McCooey, in his review in Westerley, had a wider view: "Mangroves is notable for its power, its multiplicity, and its wit. Humour, as ever, is important to Duggan and Mangoves is enlightened by many great jokes. Mangroves is an ambitious book. It is not only large and varied; but it also takes the idea of poetry to its limits. This is both ambitious and consistent with the condition of poetry."

== Awards and nominations ==
- 2004 — winner ALS Gold Medal
