= Aurealis Award for Best Children's Fiction (told primarily through words) =

Literary award category

Aurealis Award for best children's fiction (told primarily through words)
- Awarded for: Excellence in children's speculative fiction told primarily through words
- Country: Australia
- Presented by: Chimaera Publications, Conflux Inc
- First award: 2001
- Website: Official site

The Aurealis Awards are presented annually by the Australia-based Chimaera Publications and Conflux Inc to published works in order to "recognise the achievements of Australian science fiction, fantasy, horror writers". To qualify, a work must have been first published by an Australian citizen or permanent resident between 1 January and 31 December of the current year; the presentation ceremony is held the following year. It has grown from a small function of around 20 people to a two-day event attended by over 200 people.

Since their creation in 1995, awards have been given in various categories of speculative fiction. Categories currently include science fiction, fantasy, horror, speculative young adult fiction—with separate awards for novels and short fiction—collections, anthologies, illustrative works or graphic novels, children's books, and an award for excellence in speculative fiction. The awards have attracted the attention of publishers by setting down a benchmark in science fiction and fantasy. The continued sponsorship by publishers such as HarperCollins and Orbit has identified the award as an honour to be taken seriously.

The results are decided by a panel of judges from a list of submitted nominees; the long-list of nominees is reduced to a short-list of finalists. Ties can occur if the panel decides both entries show equal merit, however they are encouraged to choose a single winner. The judges may declare a "no award" if there is unanimous agreement that none of the nominees are worthy. The judges are selected from a public application process by the Award's management team.

This article lists all the short-list nominees and winners in the best children's fiction (told primarily through words) category, as well as works that have received honourable mentions or have been highly commended. The best children's fiction (told primarily through words) award was created in 2001, as best children's long fiction, along with an award for children's short fiction. In 2008 the award was renamed "best children's novel" and in 2010 was renamed again to "best children's fiction (told primarily through words)". Since 2001, honourable mentions and high commendations have been awarded intermittently. Of the 11 winners, three people have won the award twice – Garth Nix, Lian Tanner and Gabrielle Wang. John Flanagan holds the record for most nominations with five.

This award has been merged with that for best children's fiction (told primarily through pictures) into an award for best children's book.

== Winners and nominees ==
In the following table, the years correspond to the year of the book's eligibility; the ceremonies are always held the following year. Each year links to the corresponding "year in literature" article. Entries with a blue background have won the award; those with a white background are the nominees on the short-list. If the short story was originally published in a book with other stories rather than by itself or in a magazine, the book title is included after the publisher's name.

* Winners and joint winners
* Nominees on the shortlist

Year	Author(s)	Work(s)	Publisher	Ref
2001	Sally Odgers*	Candle Iron	Angus & Robertson	
2001	Kirsty Murray	Market Blues	Allen & Unwin	
2001	Michael Stephens	Blat Magic	Angus & Robertson	
2002	Gabrielle Wang*	In the Garden of Empress Cassia	Puffin Books	
2002	Justin D’Ath	Astrid Spark, Fixologist	Allen & Unwin	
2002	Catherine Jinks	Eglantine	Allen & Unwin	
2002	Dave Luckett	Rhianna and the Dogs of Iron	Scholastic	
2002	Natalie Jane Prior	Lily Quench and the Treasure of Mote Ely	Hodder Headline	
2003	Garth Nix*	Mister Monday	Allen & Unwin	
2003	Deborah Abela	Max Remy Superspy: The Hollywood Mission	Random House	
2003	Catherine Jinks	Eustace	Allen & Unwin	
2003	James Valentine	Jumpman Rule 2	Random House	
2003	Carole Wilkinson	Dragonkeeper	Black Dog Books	
2004	Colin Thompson*	How to Live Forever	Random House	
2004	John Flanagan	The Ruins of Gorlan	Random House	
2004	Cassandra Golds	Claire de Lune	Penguin Books	
2004	Sophie Masson	Snow, Fire, Sword	Random House	
2004	Gabrielle Wang	The Pearl of Tiger Bay	Penguin Books	
2005	Garth Nix*	Drowned Wednesday	Allen & Unwin	
2005	Isobelle Carmody	Little Fur	Penguin Books	
2005	Morris Gleitzman	Worm Story	Penguin Books	
2005	Richard Harland	Sassycat: The Night of the Dead	Omnibus Books	
2006	Mardi McConnochie*	Melissa, Queen of Evil	Pan Macmillan	
2006	Isobelle Carmody	A Fox Called Sorrow	Viking Press	
2006	John Flanagan	Oakleaf Bearers	Random House	
2006	Nury Vittachi	Twilight in the Land of Nowhen	Allen & Unwin	
2006	Kim Wilkins	The Sunken Kingdom Quartet	Omnibus Books	
2007	Kate Forsyth*	The Silver Horse, The Herb of Grace, The Cat’s Eye Shell, The Lightning Bolt, The Butterfly in Amber	Pan Macmillan	
2007	Isobelle Carmody	A Mystery of Wolves	Penguin Books	
2007	Emily Rodda	The Key to Rondo	Omnibus Books	
2007	Carole Wilkinson	Dragon Moon	Black Dog Books	
2008	Emily Rodda*	The Wizard of Rondo	Omnibus Books	
2008	Simon Higgins	Moonshadow	Random House	
2008	Sophie Masson	Thomas Trew and the Island of Ghosts	Hodder Children's	
2008	Carole Wilkinson	Dragon Dawn	Black Dog Books	
2008	Sean Williams	The Changeling and The Dust Devils	Angus & Robertson	
2009	Gabrielle Wang*	A Ghost in My Suitcase	Puffin Books	
2009	Deborah Abela	The Remarkable Secret of Aurelie Bonhoffen	Random House	
2009	Kate Constable	Cicada Summer	Allen & Unwin	
2009	Jen Storer	Tensy Farlow and the Home for Mislaid Children	Viking Press	
2010	Lian Tanner	The Keepers	Allen & Unwin	
2010	Deborah Abela	Grimsdon	Random House	
2010	John Flanagan	Halt's Peril	Random House	
2010	Stephen M. Giles	The Vultures of Somerset	Pan Macmillan	
2010	Jen Storer & Gus Gordon	Haggis McGregor and the Night of the Skull Moon	Penguin Books	
2011	Lian Tanner*	City of Lies	Allen & Unwin	
2011	John Flanagan	The Outcasts	Random House	
2011	Catherine Jinks	The Paradise Trap	Allen & Unwin	
2011	Thalia Kalkapsakis	"It Began With a Tingle"	Allen & Unwin (Headspinners)	
2011	Andrew McGahan	The Coming of the Whirlpool	Allen & Unwin	
2012	John Flanagan*	Brotherband: The Hunters	Random House Australia	
2012	Pamela Freeman	Princess Betony and the Unicorn	Walker Books	
2012	Emily Rodda	The Silver Door	Scholastic	
2012	Leah Swann	Irina the Wolf Queen	Xoum Publishing	

== Honourable mentions and highly commended novels ==
In the following table, the years correspond to the year of the book's eligibility; the ceremonies are always held the following year. Each year links to the corresponding "year in literature" article. Entries with a grey background have been noted as highly commended; those with a white background have received honourable mentions.

* Highly commended
* Honourable mentions

Year	Author	Novel	Publisher	Ref
2001	Janeen Webb	Sailing to Atlantis	Angus & Robertson	
2004	James Moloney	Tunnel of Ferdinand	HarperCollins	
2005	Carole Wilkinson	Garden of the Purple Dragon	Black Dog Books	
2005	John Flanagan	The Icebound Land	Random House	
2007	Alexandra Adornetto	The Shadow Thief	HarperCollins	
