= Aurealis Award for Best Children's Fiction (told primarily through pictures) =

Literary award category

Aurealis Award for best children's fiction (told primarily through pictures)
- Awarded for: Excellence in children's speculative fiction told primarily through pictures
- Country: Australia
- Presented by: Chimaera Publications, Conflux Inc
- First award: 2001
- Website: Official site

The Aurealis Awards are presented annually by the Australia-based Chimaera Publications and Conflux Inc to published works in order to "recognise the achievements of Australian science fiction, fantasy, horror writers". To qualify, a work must have been first published by an Australian citizen or permanent resident between 1 January and 31 December of the current year; the presentation ceremony is held the following year. It has grown from a small function of around 20 people to a two-day event attended by over 200 people.

Since their creation in 1995, awards have been given in various categories of speculative fiction. Categories currently include science fiction, fantasy, horror, speculative young adult fiction—with separate awards for novels and short fiction—collections, anthologies, illustrative works or graphic novels, children's books, and an award for excellence in speculative fiction. The awards have attracted the attention of publishers by setting down a benchmark in science fiction and fantasy. The continued sponsorship by publishers such as HarperCollins and Orbit has identified the award as an honour to be taken seriously.

The results are decided by a panel of judges from a list of submitted nominees; the long-list of nominees is reduced to a short-list of finalists. Ties can occur if the panel decides both entries show equal merit, however they are encouraged to choose a single winner. The judges are selected from a public application process by the Award's management team.

This article lists all the short-list nominees and winners in the best children's fiction (told primarily through pictures) category, as well as works that have received honourable mentions or have been highly commended. The best children's fiction (told primarily through pictures) award was created in 2001, as best children's short fiction, along with an award for children's long fiction. In 2008 the award was renamed "best children's illustrated work/picture book" and in 2010 was renamed again to "best children's fiction (told primarily through pictures)". Since 2001, hounarable mentions and high commendations have been awarded intermittently. Of the 20 winners, Kim Gamble is the only person to have won the award multiple times, with two wins. Anna Fienberg holds the record for most nominations with six, and Barbara Fienberg has the most nominations without winning, having been a losing finalist four times.

This award has been merged with that for best children's fiction (told primarily through words) into an award for best children's book.

== Aurealis Award for Best Children's Short Fiction ==
=== Winners and Nominees ===
In the following table, the years correspond to the year of the book's eligibility; the ceremonies are always held the following year. Each year links to the corresponding "year in literature" article. Entries with a blue background have won the award; those with a white background are the nominees on the short-list.

* Winners and joint winners
* Nominees on the shortlist

Year	Author(s)	Short story	Publisher or publication	Ref
2001	Jackie French*	Café on Callisto	Koala	
2001	Kim Caraher	Zip Zap	Random House Australia	
2001	Claire Carmichael	Saving Aunt Alice	Random House Australia	
2001	Christine Harris	Hairy Legs	Random House Australia	
2002	Anna Fienberg* & Kim Gamble*	Tashi and the Haunted House	Allen & Unwin	
2002	Terry Denton	The Golden Udder	Allen & Unwin	
2002	Justin D'Ath	The Two Natalies	Reel Trouble, Spinouts Sapphire (Longman)	
2002	Andrew Chapman	In the Blink of an Eye	Reel Trouble, Spinouts Sapphire (Longman)	
2002	Gary Crew & Marc McBride	Old Ridley	Hodder	
2003	Natalie Jane Prior*	Lily Quench and the Lighthouse of Skellig Mor	Hodder Headline Australia	
2003	Duncan Ball	Emily Eyefinger and the Balloon Bandits	HarperCollins	
2003	Roseanne Hawke	Wolfchild	Lothian	
2003	Anna Fienberg & Barbara Fienberg	Tashi and the Royal Tombs	Allen & Unwin	
2003	Natalie Jane Prior*	Lily Quench and the Magicians' Pyramid	Hodder Headline Australia	
2004	Gary Crew* & Steven Wollman*	Beneath the Surface	Hodder	
2004	Stephen Axelsen	The Very Messy Inspection	Random House	
2004	Duncan Ball	Emily Eyefinger and the Ghost Ship	HarperCollins	
2004	Anna Fienberg & Barbara Fienberg	There Once Was a Boy Named Tashi	Allen & Unwin	
2004	Gregory Rogers	The Boy, The Bear, The Baron, The Bard	Allen & Unwin	
2005	Stephen Axelsen*	Piccolo & Annabel 2: The Disastrous Party	Random House Australia	
2005	Goldie Alexander	The Space Gypsies	The School Magazine 7	
2005	Stephen Axelsen	Piccolo & Annabel 3: The Stinky Cheese Gypsies	Random House Australia	
2005	Gary Crew & Jeremy Geddes	The Mystery of Eilean Mor	Lothian	
2006	Jane Godwin*	The True Story of Mary Who Wanted to Stand on Her Head	Allen & Unwin	
2006	Margaret Wild* & Anne Spudvilas*	Woolvs in the Sitee	Penguin	
2006	Victor Kelleher & Stephen Michael King	The Magic Violin	Penguin	
2007	Marc McBride*	World of Monsters	Scholastic Australia	
2007	Briony Stewart*	Kumiko and the Dragon	UQP	
2007	Luke Edwards	Ock Von Fiend	Omnibus Books	
2007	Anna Fienberg & Barbara Fienberg	Tashi and the Mixed Up Monster	Allen & Unwin	

=== Honourable mentions and highly commended short stories ===
In the following table, the years correspond to the year of the short story's eligibility; the ceremonies are always held the following year. Each year links to the corresponding "year in literature" article. Entries with a grey background have been noted as highly commended; those with a white background have received honourable mentions.

* Highly commended
* Honourable mentions

Year	Author	Work	Publisher^{[I]}	Ref
2001	Paul Collins	Movie World	HarperCollins (Longman)	
2001	Andrew Whitmore	Ark of Dreams The Ark of Dreams	Black Dog Books	
2004	John Marsden*	Roomful of Magic A Roomful of Magic	Pan Macmillan	

I Publisher names in parentheses indicate the imprint under which the book was published.

== Aurealis Award for Best Children's Illustrated Work/Picture Book ==
=== 2008–2009 ===
In the following table, the years correspond to the year of the book's eligibility; the ceremonies are always held the following year. Each year links to the corresponding "year in literature" article. Entries with a blue background have won the award; those with a white background are the nominees on the short-list.

* Winners and joint winners
* Nominees on the shortlist

Year	Author(s)	Illustrator(s)	Work	Publisher^{[I]}	Ref
2008	Richard Harland*	Laura Peterson*	Escape!, Under Siege, Race to the Ruins, The Heavy Crown (The Wolf Kingdom series)	Omnibus Books	
2008	Anna Fienberg & Barbara Fienberg	Kim Gamble	Tashi and the Phoenix	Allen & Unwin	
2008	Ian Irvine	David Cornish	Thorn Castle, Giant's Lair, Black Crypt, Wizardry Crag (The Sorcerer's Tower series)	Omnibus Books	
2008	Sally Morgan with Ezekiel, Ambelin and Blaze Kwaymullina	Adam Hill	Curly and the Fent	Random House Australia	
2008	Richard Tulloch	Terry Denton	Twisted Tales	Random House Australia	
2009	Pamela Freeman*	Kim Gamble*	Victor's Challenge	Walker Books Australia	
2009	Graeme Base		Enigma	Penguin (Viking)	
2009	Anna Fienberg	Kim Gamble	Tashi and the Golem	Allen & Unwin	
2009	Dan McGuiness		Pilot and Huxley	Omnibus Books	
2009	Gregory Rogers		The Hero of Little Street	Allen & Unwin	

I Publisher names in parentheses indicate the imprint under which the book was published.

== Aurealis Award for Best Children's Fiction (told primarily through pictures) ==
=== 2010 onwards ===
In the following table, the years correspond to the year of the book's eligibility; the ceremonies are always held the following year. Each year links to the corresponding "year in literature" article. Entries with a blue background have won the award; those with a white background are the nominees on the short-list.

* Winners and joint winners
* Nominees on the shortlist

Year	Writer(s)	Illustrator(s)	Work	Publisher	Ref
2010	Sonya Hartnett*	Lucia Masciullo*	The Boy and the Toy	Viking Press	
2010	Isobelle Carmody	Anne Spudvilas	Night School	Viking Press	
2010	Luke Davies	Inari Kiuru	Magpie	ABC Books	
2010	Julie Hunt & Sue Moss	Gaye Chapman	Precious Little	Allen & Unwin	
2010	David Richardson	Steven Hunt	The Cloudchasers	ABC Books	
2011	Christopher Cheng*	Sarah Davis*	Sounds Spooky	Random House	
2011	Aaron Blabey	Aaron Blabey	The Ghost of Miss Annabel Spoon	Viking Press	
2011	Norman Jorgensen	James Foley	The Last Viking	Fremantle Press	
2011	Tom Taylor	James Brouwer	The Deep: Here Be Dragons	Gestalt Publishing	
2011	Margaret Wild	Andrew Yeo	Vampyre	Walker Books	
2012	Graeme Base*	Graeme Base	Little Elephants	Viking Penguin	
2012	Gary Crew	Ross Watkins	The Little Boy Who Grew into a Tree	Penguin Group Australia	
2012	Gary Crew	Den Scheer	In the Beech Forest	Ford Street Publishing	
2012	Mark Wilson	Mark Wilson	Inside the World of Tom Roberts	Lothian Children's Books	
