= Children's Book of the Year Award: Younger Readers =

Australian literary award from 1982

- Awarded for: Excellence in Australian middle to upper primary school books
- Country: Australia
- Presented by: Children's Book Council of Australia
- First award: 1982
- Website: cbca.org.au

The Children's Book of the Year Award: Younger Readers has been presented annually since 1982 by the Children's Book Council of Australia (CBCA). Note: from 1982 to 1986 this award was titled Junior Book of the Year.

The Award "will be made to outstanding books of fiction, drama, poetry or concept books for readers who have developed independent reading skills but are still developing in literary appreciation. Generally, books in this category will be appropriate in style and content for readers from the middle to upper primary years."

== Award winners ==
The most awarded author is Emily Rodda, with six awards.

=== 1980s ===
| Year | Author | Title | Publisher | Ref |
|---|---|---|---|---|
| 1982 | Christobel Mattingley, illus. Patricia Mullins | Rummage | Angus and Robertson | |
| 1983 | Robin Klein, illus. Alison Lester | Thing | Oxford University Press | |
| 1984 | Max Dann, illus. Ann James | Bernice Knows Best | Oxford University Press | |
| 1985 | Emily Rodda, illus. Noela Young | Something Special | Angus and Robertson | |
| 1986 | Mary Steele | Arkwright | Hyland House | |
| 1987 | Emily Rodda, illus. Noela Young | Pigs Might Fly | Angus and Robertson | |
| 1988 | Nadia Wheatley and Donna Rawlins | My Place | Collins Dove | |
| 1989 | Emily Rodda, illus. Noela Young | The Best-Kept Secret | Angus and Robertson | |

=== 1990s ===
| Year | Author | Title | Publisher | Ref |
|---|---|---|---|---|
| 1990 | Jeanie Adams | Pigs and Honey | Omnibus Books | |
| 1991 | Emily Rodda, illus. Noela Young | Finders Keepers | Omnibus Books | |
| 1992 | Anna Fienberg, illus. Kim Gamble | The Magnificent Nose and Other Marvels | Allen & Unwin | |
| 1993 | Garry Disher | The Bamboo Flute | Angus & Robertson | |
| 1994 | Emily Rodda | Rowan of Rin | Omnibus Books | |
| 1995 | Wendy Orr, illus. Kerry Millard | Ark in the Park | HarperCollins | |
| 1996 | James Moloney | Swashbuckler | University of Queensland Press | |
| 1997 | Libby Gleeson, illus. Ann James | Hannah Plus One | Puffin Books | |
| 1998 | Elaine Forrestal | Someone Like Me | Puffin Books | |
| 1999 | Meme McDonald and Boori Pryor | My Girragundji | Allen & Unwin | |

=== 2000s ===
| Year | Author | Title | Publisher | Ref |
|---|---|---|---|---|
| 2000 | Jackie French | Hitler's Daughter | HarperCollins | |
| 2001 | Diana Kidd | Two Hands Together | Penguin Books | |
| 2002 | John Heffernan, illus. Andrew McLean | My Dog | Margaret Hamilton Books | |
| 2003 | Catherine Bateson | Rain May and Captain Daniel | University of Queensland Press | |
| 2004 | Carole Wilkinson | Dragonkeeper | Black Dog Books | |
| 2005 | Sonya Hartnett | The Silver Donkey | Viking Books | |
| 2006 | Elizabeth Fensham | Helicopter Man | Bloomsbury Press | |
| 2007 | Catherine Bateson | Being Bee | University of Queensland Press | |
| 2008 | Carole Wilkinson | Dragon Moon | Black Dog Books | |
| 2009 | Glenda Millard, illus. Stephen Michael King | Perry Angel's Suitcase | ABC Books | |

=== 2010s ===
| Year | Author | Title | Publisher | Ref. |
|---|---|---|---|---|
| 2010 | Odo Hirsch | Darius Bell and the Glitter Pool | Allen & Unwin | |
| 2011 | Isobelle Carmody | The Red Wind | Viking Books | |
| 2012 | Kate Constable | Crow Country | Allen & Unwin | |
| 2013 | Sonya Hartnett | The Children of the King | Viking Books | |
| 2014 | Catherine Jinks | City of Orphans: A Very Unusual Pursuit | Allen & Unwin | |
| 2015 | Libby Gleeson | The Cleo Stories : The Necklace and the Present | Allen & Unwin | |
| 2016 | Morris Gleitzman | Soon | Viking Books | |
| 2017 | Trace Balla | Rockhopping | Allen & Unwin | |
| 2018 | Bren MacDibble | How to Bee | Allen & Unwin | |
| 2019 | Emily Rodda | His Name Was Walter | HarperCollins | |

=== 2020s ===
| Year | Author | Title | Publisher | Ref. |
|---|---|---|---|---|
| 2020 | Pip Harry | The Little Wave | University of Queensland Press | |
| 2021 | Kate Gordon | Aster's Good, Right Things | Riveted Press | |
| 2022 | Shirley Marr | A Glasshouse of Stars | Puffin | |
| 2023 | Craig Silvey | Runt | Allen & Unwin | |
| 2024 | Tristan Bancks | Scar Town | Penguin Random House Australia | |
| 2025 | Maryam Master, illus. Astred Hicks | Laughter Is the Best Ending | Pan | |
| 2026 | Karen Wasson, illus. Jake A. Minton | Inked | Figment Books | |

== See also ==
- List of CBCA Awards
- List of Australian literary awards
