= Dragonkeeper (film) =

- Spanish theatrical release poster
- Directed by: Salvador Simó; Li Jianping
- Written by: Carole Wilkinson; Pablo Castrillo; Ignacio Ferreras; Rosanna Checcini
- Based on: Dragonkeeper by Carole Wilkinson
- Produced by: Larry Levene
- Music by: Arturo Cardelús
- Production companies: Guardián de Dragones AIE; China Film Animation; China Film Group Corporation; Movistar Plus+; Atresmedia Cine
- Distributed by: A Contracorriente Films (Spain); China Film Group (China)
- Release dates: 1 March 2024 (Málaga); 19 April 2024 (Spain)
- Running time: 98 minutes
- Countries: Spain; China
- Budget: €24 million
- Box office: $3.8 million

Dragonkeeper is a 2024 animated fantasy adventure film directed by Salvador Simó and Li Jianping, with a script written by Carole Wilkinson, Pablo Castrillo, Ignacio Ferreras and Rosanna Checcini, based on Carole Wilkinson's 2003 novel Dragonkeeper. A Spanish-Chinese co-production, it opened the 27th Málaga Film Festival on 1 March 2024.

== Plot ==
In an alternate Han Imperial China, dragons are banished from the kingdom due to matters of distrust, with the Chinese Emperor enslaving and imprisoning dragons in large pens, harnessing their Qi (psychic energy) to extend his life. An orphan girl named Ping is raised as a slave at a large pen by a kindly elderly woman named Lao Ma, who are tasked with feeding the captive dragons Long Danzi and Lu Yu. The pen is run by Master Lan, who mistreats Ping and Lao Ma. Ping also befriends a rat named Hua.

During a dream, Ping experiences an encounter with the female dragon Lu Yu, who entrusts her with looking after her and Danzi's dragon egg, which contains their child. Shortly later, Lu Yu dies in captivity. In response, the Emperor dispatches the civil servant and dragon hunter Diao to bring the remaining dragon Long Danzi to the Emperor, who intends to harness his Qi. Diao also punishes Master Lan for his failure to keep Lu Yu alive. Diao discovers that Ping is able to harness Qi and attempts to use her as a hostage to force Danzi to come with them. While the soldiers attempt to force Danzi into a large cage, Ping helps him escape with Hua.

Diao, however, is able to secure the dragon egg, which he brings to the Emperor who uses its Qi to prolong his life. In secret, Diao seeks to harness the psychic energy inside the egg to achieve immortality. In the wild, Danzi befriends Ping and teaches her how to use Qi. He also tells Ping that she is part of a long line of Dragon Keepers. Together with Hua, the three embark on a mission to rescue the dragon egg containing Danzi's unhatched son from the Imperial royal palace. Along the way, Ping befriends Wang Chao, a herbalist who is secretly working for Diao.

Danzi attacks the royal palace, battling Imperial soldiers led by Kwan. Working together, Ping and Hua manage to infiltrate the palace and recover the dragon egg. Pursued by the Emperor's soldiers, they escape with the help of Wang Chao, who leads them to an underground catacomb where Diao has a secret laboratory. Chao betrays Ping and travels with Diao via an underground river to his secret laboratory. Danzi, Kwan, Ping and Hua eventually converge at Diao's laboratory, where the dragon hunter uses sorcery to transfer the dragon egg's Qi into himself, transforming himself into a giant dragon-like monster.

A repentant Wang Chao sacrifices himself to free the dragon egg from Diao's transformation chamber. The transformed Diao gains the upper hand over the wounded Danzi, but Ping convinces Danzi to let the ravenous Diao absorb more of his Qi, making him grow so big he is crushed to death by falling rocks within the cavern. While the Imperial soldiers escape to the surface, Ping and Hua escape with Danzi and the dragon egg to the coast, where they find the pool that will allow the egg to hatch. Ping uses her Qi to lift the mortally wounded Danzi into the air, allowing him to fly across the ocean to the Isle Of the Blest, where he can be healed, while Ping and Hua look after his newly hatched son.

== English-language voice cast ==
- Mayalinee Griffiths as Ping
- Bill Nighy as Danzi the Dragon
- Anthony Howell as Diao
- Bill Bailey as Wang Chao
- Paul McEwan as Emperor
- Beth Chambers as Lu Yu

== Production ==
The project, an adaptation of the first novel of Carole Wilkinson's 6-book-saga, was reported in 2017 as a Spanish-Chinese co-production between China Film Group's China Film Animation alongside Spain's Dragoia Media, Movistar Plus+ and Atresmedia Cine. The film's budget was €24 million.

Spanish animation was begun by Ilion Animation Studios, but after that company was purchased by Skydance Animation, a new studio called Guardián de Dragones was created to finish production. Sergio Pablos's SPA Studios in Madrid also worked on some of the early development and production.

== Release ==
The film secured theatrical releases in Spain (by A Contracorriente), China (by China Film Group) and Latin America (by Imagem Filmes). Viva Kids bought the North American distribution rights to the film, while Hulu secured streaming rights for the post-theatrical window in the region. Dragonkeeper was scheduled to open in Spanish theaters on 22 September 2023, but its release was postponed from 2023 to 2024. The film opened the 27th Málaga Film Festival on 4 March 2024, ahead of its theatrical debut in Spain in 300 screens on 19 April. In the same year, Viva Pictures released the film in the United States on 3 May, while Vertigo Releasing released the film in the United Kingdom and Ireland on 27 September in 460 sites. Umbrella Entertainment released the film on 16 January 2025 in Australia and New Zealand.

== Reception ==
=== Critical response ===
On the review aggregator website Rotten Tomatoes, 67% of 9 critics' reviews are positive, with an average rating of 5.8/10.

=== Accolades ===
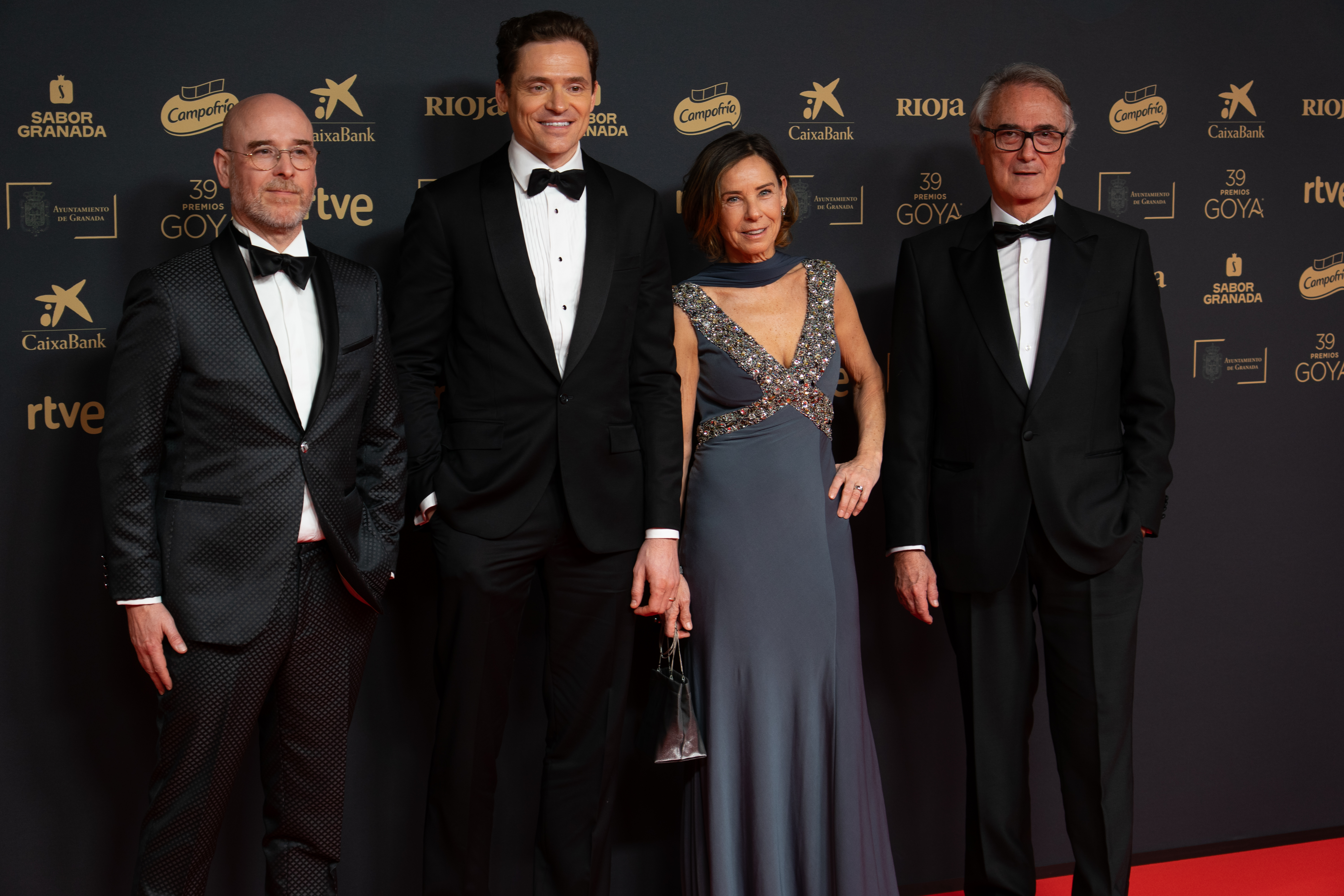
Crew of Dragonkeeper attending the 39th Goya Awards in February 2025

Year	Award	Category	Nominee(s)	Result	Ref.
2024	37th Golden Rooster Awards	Best Animation Film		Won	
2024	15th Hollywood Music in Media Awards	Best Original Score in an Animated Film	Arturo Cardelús	Nominated	
2024	30th Forqué Awards	Best Animation Film		Nominated	
2025	39th Goya Awards	Best Animation Film		Nominated	
2025	39th Goya Awards	Best Original Score	Arturo Cardelús	Nominated	
2025	39th Goya Awards	Best Special Effects	Li Xin	Nominated	

== See also ==
- List of Spanish films of 2024
