= Aurealis Award for Best Children's Fiction =

Australian children's literary award

Aurealis Award for best children's fiction
- Awarded for: Excellence in children's speculative fiction
- Country: Australia
- Presented by: Chimaera Publications, Continuum Foundation
- First award: 2013 (merging two previous categories)
- Currently held by: Karen Foxlee
- Website: Official site

The Aurealis Awards are presented annually by the Australia-based Chimaera Publications and WASFF to published works in order to "recognise the achievements of Australian science fiction, fantasy, horror writers". To qualify, a work must have been first published by an Australian citizen or permanent resident between 1 January and 31 December of the corresponding year; the presentation ceremony is held the following year. It has grown from a small function of around 20 people to a two-day event attended by over 200 people.

Since their creation in 1995, awards have been given in various categories of speculative fiction. Categories currently include science fiction, fantasy, horror, speculative young adult fiction—with separate awards for novels and short fiction—collections, anthologies, illustrative works or graphic novels, children's books, and an award for excellence in speculative fiction. The awards have attracted the attention of publishers by setting down a benchmark in science fiction and fantasy. The continued sponsorship by publishers such as HarperCollins and Orbit has identified the award as an honour to be taken seriously.

The results are decided by a panel of judges from a list of submitted nominees; the long-list of nominees is reduced to a short-list of finalists. Ties can occur if the panel decides both entries show equal merit, however they are encouraged to choose a single winner. The judges may declare a "no award" if there is unanimous agreement that none of the nominees are worthy. The judges are selected from a public application process by the Award's management team.

This article lists all the short-list nominees and winners in the best children's fiction category which replaces the following two previous categories for children's fiction:

- Aurealis Award for best children's fiction (told primarily through words)
- Aurealis Award for best children's fiction (told primarily through pictures)

In 2013, this award was known as the Aurealis Award for best children's book.

== Winners and nominees ==
In the following table, the years correspond to the year of the work's eligibility; the ceremonies are always held the following year. Each year links to the corresponding "year in literature" article. Entries with a blue background have won the award; those with a white background are the nominees on the short-list. If the work was originally published in a book with other stories rather than by itself or in a magazine, the book title is included after the publisher's name.

As of February 2026, Bren MacDibble has won twice and the following have received multiple nominations:

- Lian Tanner (5)
- Bren MacDibble (5)
- Emily Rodda (4)
- Zana Fraillon (3
- Angelica Banks (2)
- Anna Ciddor (2)
- Karen Foxlee (4)
- Emily Gale (2)
- Rebecca Lim (3)
- Meg McKinlay (2)
- Jaclyn Moriarty (2)
- Judith Rossell (2)
- Lili Wilkinson (2)

* Winners and joint winners
* Nominees on the shortlist

Year	Author(s)	Work(s)	Publisher	Ref
2013	Kirsty Murray*	The Four Seasons of Lucy McKenzie	Allen & Unwin	
2013	Isobelle Carmody	Kingdom of the Lost, book 2: Cloud Road	Penguin Books Australia	
2013	Jackie French	Refuge	HarperCollins	
2013	Julie Hunt	Song for a scarlet runner	Allen & Unwin	
2013	Shaun Tan	Rules of Summer	Hachette Australia	
2013	Lian Tanner	Icebreaker: The Hidden 1	Allen & Unwin	
2014	Carole Wilkinson*	Shadow Sister: Dragonkeeper 5	Black Dog Books	
2014	John Flanagan	Slaves of Socorro: Brotherband 4	Random House Australia	
2014	Karen Foxlee	Ophelia and the Marvellous Boy	Hot Key Books	
2014	Norman Jorgensen & James Foley	The Last Viking Returns	Fremantle Press	
2014	Judith Rossell	Withering-by-Sea	ABC Books	
2014	Lian Tanner	Sunker's Deep	Allen & Unwin	
2015	Meg McKinlay*	A Single Stone	Walker Books Australia	
2015	Angelica Banks	A Week Without Tuesday	Allen & Unwin	
2015	Jack Heath	The Cut-Out	Allen & Unwin	
2015	Meg McKinlay	Bella and the Wandering House	Fremantle Press	
2015	A. L. Tait	The Mapmaker Chronicles: Prisoner of the Black Hawk	Hachette Australia	
2016	Kim Kane*	When the Lyrebird Calls	Allen & Unwin	
2016	Angelica Banks	Blueberry Pancakes Forever	Allen & Unwin	
2016	Lee Battersby	Magrit	Walker Books Australia	
2016	Caleb Crisp	Somebody Stop Ivy Pocket	Bloomsbury	
2016	Mick Elliott	The Turners	Hachette Australia	
2016	Emily Rodda	The Hungry Isle	Omnibus Books	
2017	Jessica Townsend*	Nevermoor	Hachette Australia	
2017	Bren MacDibble	How to Bee	Allen & Unwin	
2017	Jaclyn Moriarty	The Extremely Inconvenient Adventures of Bronte Mettlestone	Allen & Unwin	
2017	Emily Rodda	The Shop at Hoopers Bend	HarperCollins Australia	
2017	Jo Sandhu	The Exile	Penguin Random House Australia	
2017	Lian Tanner	Accidental Heroes	Allen & Unwin	
2018	Penni Russon*	The Endsister	Allen & Unwin	
2018	Rebecca Lim	The Relic of the Blue Dragon	Allen & Unwin	
2018	Jaclyn Moriarty	The Slightly Alarming Tales of the Whispering Wars	Allen & Unwin	
2018	Lian Tanner	Secret Guardians	Allen & Unwin	
2018	Gabrielle Wang	Ting Ting the Ghosthunter	Penguin Random House Australia	
2018	Rhiannon Williams	Ottilie Cotter and the Narroway Hunt	Hardie Grant Egmont	
2019	Bren MacDibble*	The Dog Runner	Allen & Unwin	
2019	Amie Kaufman	Scorch Dragons	HarperCollins	
2019	Rebecca Lim	Race for the Red Dragon	Allen & Unwin	
2019	Rebecca McRitchie (with Sharon O'Connor, illustrator)	Jinxed! the Curious Curse of Cora Bell	HarperCollins	
2019	Emily Rodda (with Marc McBride, illustrator)	The Glimme	Scholastic	
2019	Heather Waugh	The Lost Stone of SkyCity	Fremantle Press	
2020	Zana Fraillon*	The Lost Soul Atlas	Lothian	
2020	Nicholas J. Johnson	Tricky Nick	Pan	
2020	Bren MacDibble	Across the Risen Sea	Allen & Unwin	
2020	Frances Watts	The Chicken's Curse	Allen & Unwin	
2020	Lili Wilkinson (with Dustin Spence, illustrator)	Hodgepodge: How to make a pet monster	Allen & Unwin	
2020	Sean Williams	Her Perilous Mansion	Allen & Unwin	
2021	Karen Foxlee*	Dragon Skin	Allen & Unwin	
2021	Anna Ciddor	The Boy Who Stepped Through Time	Allen & Unwin	
2021	James Foley	Stellarphant	Fremantle	
2021	Zana Fraillon & Phil Lesnie	The Curiosities	Hachette Australia	
2021	Emily Gale & Nova Weetman	Elsewhere Girls	Text	
2021	Nicholas Snelling	Barebum Billy	BAD DAD	
2022	Melanie La'Brooy	The Wintrish Girl	UQP	
2022	Victoria Carless	Gus and the Starlight	HarperCollins	
2022	Karen Foxlee (with Frieda Chui, illustrator)	The Wrath of the Woolington Wym	Allen & Unwin	
2022	Zana Fraillon & Bren MacDibble	The Raven's Song	Allen & Unwin	
2022	Emily Gale	The Goodbye Year	Text	
2022	H. M. Waugh	Mars Awakens	Allen & Unwin	
2023	Lian Tanner	Spellhound	Allen & Unwin	
2023	Reece Carter	The Lonely Lighthouse of Elston-Fright	Allen & Unwin	
2023	Remy Lai	Ghost Book	Allen & Unwin	
2023	Rebecca Lim	The Letterbox Tree	Walker Books	
2023	Skye Melki-Wegner	Deadlands: Hunted	Walker Books	
2023	Jessica Miller	The Hotel Witch	Text	
2024	Bren MacDibble	The Apprentice Witnesser	Allen & Unwin	
2024	Gabriel Bergmoser	Andromache Between Worlds	HarperCollins	
2024	Karen Foxlee, ill. Freda Chiu	The Bother with the Bonkillyknock Beast	Allen & Unwin	
2024	Emily Rodda	Landovel	Allen & Unwin	
2024	Judith Rossell	The Midwatch	HGCP	
2024	L. M. Wilkinson, ill. Lavanya Naidu	Bravepaw and the Heartstone of Alluria	Albert Street Books	
2025	Sandy Bigna	Little Bones	UQP	
2025	Adrian Beck	Villain	Scholastic	
2025	Anna Ciddor	Moonboy	Allen & Unwin	
2025	Rachel Jackson	Escape from Firestone Fortress	Riveted Press	
2025	Paul Russell	The Last Seed Keeper	E K Books	
2025	Matt Shanks	When the Mountain Wakes	Affirm	
