= Zana Fraillon =

Australian writer

- Born: January 1981 (age 45); Melbourne, Australia
- Occupation: Teacher/Writer
- Website: zanafraillon.com

Zana Fraillon (born 1981) is an Australian writer of fiction for children and young adults based in Melbourne, Australia.

Fraillon is known for writing in fiction about human rights abuses and in 2017 she won an Amnesty CILIP Honour for her book The Bone Sparrow which highlights the plight of the Rohingya people. The Bone Sparrow was translated to the stage and premiered in the York Theatre Royal, England, on 25 February 2022.

== Biography ==
Fraillon was born in Melbourne and spent her early childhood in San Francisco. She was an avid reader as a child and grew up surrounded by books. She attributes a vision problem that was not diagnosed until she was seven as the reason she was more focused on books than the world around her. Fraillon studied history, spent a year teaching in China and returned to Melbourne to study and work as a teacher. She is from a family of writers and began writing fun picture books with her son. A friend encouraged her to submit these to a publisher and her writing career was born.

== Bibliography ==
- When No One's Looking At the Zoo Hardie Grant Egmont 2009
- When No One's Looking On the Farm Hardie Grant Egmont 2012
- Monstrum House Hardie Grant Egmont 2012
- No Stars to Wish On Allen & Unwin 2014
- The Bone Sparrow Lothian Children's Books 2016
- The Ones That Disappeared Hachette Children's Group 2017
- Wisp - A Story of Hope Lothian Children's Books 2018
- The Lost Soul Atlas Lothian Children's Books 2020
- The Curiosities Lothian Children's Books 2021
- The Way of Dog (UQP, 2022)
- The Raven's Song written with Bren MacDibble (Allen & Unwin, Aus/NZ, 2022) (Old Barn Books, UK, 2022)
- Song of a Thousand Seas (UQP, 2025)

== Awards ==
- The Bone Sparrow
  - Winner of the Amnesty CILIP Honor Prize 2017
  - Winner of the ABIA Book of the Year for Older Children 2017
  - Winner of the Readings Young Adult Book Prize 2017
  - International Board on Books for Young People (IBBY) Australian Honour Book 2018
  - Children's Book Council of Australia (CBCA) Honour Book 2017 - Older Readers
  - Shortlisted in the Prime Minister's Literary Awards 2017
  - Shortlisted for a CILIP Carnegie Medal 2017
  - Shortlisted for the Victorian Premier's Literary Award 2017
  - Shortlisted in the Queensland Literary Awards 2017
  - Shortlisted in the Guardian Children's Fiction Prize 2016
  - Shortlisted in the Inky Awards 2017
- The Ones that Disappeared
  - Winner of the NSW Premier's Literary Awards Ethel Turner Prize for Young People's Literature 2018
  - A Children's Book Council of Australia (CBCA) Notable Book 2018
  - Shortlisted in the Prime Minister's Literary Awards 2018
  - Nominated for the 2018 CILIP Carnegie Medal
  - Shortlisted for the UK CrimeFest Award - Best Crime Novel for Young Adults
- Wisp
  - Longlisted in the 2020 Kate Greenaway Award
- The Lost Soul Atlas
  - Nominated for the 2021 CILIP Carnegie Medal
  - Shortlisted for the 2021 CBCA Children's Book of the Year Award: Older Readers
  - Winner, 2020 Aurealis Award for best children's fiction
- The Raven's Song
  - Shortlisted for the 2023 CBCA Children's Book of the Year Award: Younger Readers
  - Shortlisted for the 2023 WA Premier's Prize for Children's Book of the Year
- The Way of Dog
  - Shortlisted for the 2023 CBCA Children's Book of the Year Award: Younger Readers
  - Shortlisted for the 2023 Children's Book Award at the Queensland Literary Awards
- Song of a Thousand Seas
  - Winner, Children's Prime Minister's Literary Awards 2026
