= Purple Dragon =

Purple Dragon may refer to:

- Lamium maculatum, a plant
- A group of thugs called the Purple Dragons in the Teenage Mutant Ninja Turtles franchise.
- A standard computer science textbook Compilers: Principles, Techniques, and Tools
- A type of dragon in Dungeons & Dragons

== See also ==
- Garden of the Purple Dragon, a fantasy novel
