= The True Story of Mary =

Book by Jane Godwin

- Author: Jane Godwin
- Illustrator: Drahos Zak
- Language: English
- Genre: chapter book, nonsense poetry
- Published: 2005 (Allen & Unwin)
- Publication place: Australia
- Media type: Print (hardback)
- Pages: 49
- ISBN: 9781741147162
- OCLC: 76888580

The True Story of Mary: Who Wanted To Stand On Her Head is a 2005 Children's chapter book by Jane Godwin. It is a rhyming story about a girl called Mary who, upon standing on her head, has a number of adventures.

Godwin described it as "probably the strangest story I have written".

== Reception ==
The True Story of Mary has been reviewed by Australian Bookseller & Publisher.

It is a 2006 Aurealis Award children's short story joint winner, and a 2006 Children's Book Council of Australia shortlisted book of the year for younger readers.

== See also ==
- Dr. Seuss bibliography
- Edward Lear
- The Walrus and the Carpenter
