= Tomodachi =

Tomodachi (友達; ともだち; or トモダチ) is a Japanese word meaning "friend(s)". It can also refer to:

== Songs ==
- "Tomodachi", a song by Ketsumeishi
- "Tomodachi", a song by Milk & Bone
- "Tomodachi no Wao!", a song by Puffy AmiYumi
- "Tomodachi", a song by Kyu Sakamoto, appearing on the compilation album Kyu Sakamoto Memorial Best
- "Tomodachi", a song by Maaya Sakamoto released with the song "Yakusoku wa Iranai"
- "Tomodachi e Say What You Will", a song by SMAP
- "Tomodachi (song)", a song by Utada Hikaru, appearing on the album Fantôme
- "Odd Couple" ("O tomodachi" in Japanese), a song by Gen Hoshino
- "Team Tomodachi", a Song by Yuki Chiba

== Manga and other literature ==
- Tomodachi, the fictional leader of a fictional apocalyptic sect in the manga 20th Century Boys by Naoki Urasawa
- Tomodachi, an award-winning play by Kōbō Abe
- Tomodachi, a chapter in volume one of the One Piece manga by Eiichiro Oda
- Tomodachi – Edge of the World, a novel by author Simon Higgins
- Tomodachi Game, a manga series conceptualized by Mikoto Yamaguchi and written and illustrated by Yuki Sato.

== Other ==
- Tomodachi (film), a film featuring Yūsaku Matsuda
- Tomodachi Collection, a game released in Japan on Nintendo DS
- Tomodachi Life (video game), a game released on Nintendo 3DS
- Tomodachi Life: Living the Dream, a game released on Nintendo Switch
- Operation Tomodachi, an operation to assist to support Japan after the 2011 Tōhoku earthquake and tsunami
- Tomo-Dachi, an anime convention in Northern Ireland

== See also ==
- Tamagotchi (disambiguation), egg pet
- 友達 (disambiguation)
