= Fienberg =

Fienberg is a surname. Notable people with the surname include:

- Anna Fienberg (born 1956), Australian writer
- Gregg Fienberg (born 1960), American television producer and director
- Stephen Fienberg (1942–2016), Canadian professor
