= Kirsty Murray =

Australian children's fiction writer

- Born: Kirstin Doris Boyd; 1960 (age 65–66); Melbourne, Victoria, Australia
- Education: Professional Writing and Editing at RMIT
- Occupation: Author
- Known for: Children of the Wind series
- Website: http://www.kirstymurray.com/

Kirsty Murray (born 1960) is an Australian author. Murray writes children's fiction with a focus on Australian history. She is known for the Children of the Wind series of children's novels. She is a recipient of the Aurealis Award for best children's fiction.

== Biography ==
Kirsty Murray was born in 1960 in Melbourne, Victoria. Murray has lived in Canada, France, and Wales and her current home is in Melbourne Australia. Murray worked in the graphic arts field, before enrolling in Professional Writing and Editing at RMIT. Her works are studied at La Trobe University in the children's literature genre. Murray is an Ambassador for the Victorian Premier's Reading Challenge, and has been a Creative Fellow of the State Library of Victoria (2006). Murray was an Asialink Literature Resident at the University of Madras in South India in 2007. Murray serves on the board of the Australian Society of Authors and the Australian Copyright Agency, representing the rights of Australian authors at a national level.

== Awards ==
- 2025 - ASA Medal
- 2021 - Shortlisted - Children's Book of the Year Award: Eve Pownall Award for Information Books: Strangers on Country (co-written with David Hartley)
- 2019 - Shortlisted - Children's Book Council of Australia - Book of the Year: Early Childhood: "When Billy was a Dog"
- 2019 - Shortlisted - WA Premier’s Book Awards - Writing for Children: "Puddle Hunters"
- 2018 - Nominee - Astrid Lindgren Memorial Award
- 2015 - Notable Book – Older Readers – Children's Book Council of Australia: "The Year it All Ended"
- 2013 - Winner - Aurealis Award Best Children's Book: "The Four Seasons of Lucy McKenzie"
- 2013 - Honour Book - Children's Book Council of Australia - Eve Pownall Award for Non-fiction: "Topsy Turvy World"
- 2000 - Winner - WA Premier's Book Award for Children's Writing: Zarconi's Magic Flying Fish
- 2005 - Winner - WA Premier's writing for Young Adults Award: A Prayer for the Blue DelaneyWestern Australian Premier's Book Awards#2005 winners
- 2004 NSW Premier's History Awards - Shortlist for The Young People's History Prize
- 2010 NSW Premier's Literary Awards - Shortlist for the Ethel Turner Prize for Young People's Literature
- 2011 - Winner - NSW Premier's History Awards - The Young People's History Prize: "India Dark"
- Shortlisted for Aurealis Fantasy and Science Fiction Award 2001 Aurealis Award for best children's novel
- Nominated for the West Australian Young Readers Book Award 2007 for Older Readers for the Secret Life of Maeve Lee Kwong
- CBCA Notable Book - 2002 for Market Blues, 2003 for Walking Home with Marie Claire, 2004 for Bridie's Fire, 2005 for Becoming Billy Dare, 2006 for A Prayer for Blue Delaney, 2011 for India Dark

== Bibliography ==
=== Fiction ===
- "The Year it All Ended" (September 2014)
- "The Four Seasons of Lucy McKenzie" (August 2013)
- The Clever Cats' Bookclub (March 2013)
- India Dark (AU - August 2010) - India Dark (UK - January 2012) - The Lilliputians (India - October 2012)
- Vulture's Gate (AU - August 2009) - Vulture's Wake (US - May 2010)

Children of the Wind series:

- Book I Bridie's Fire (November 2003)
- Book II Becoming Billy Dare (December 2004)
- Book III A Prayer for Blue Delaney (September 2005)
- Book IV The Secret Life of Maeve Lee Kwong (September 2006)

- Zarconi's Magic Flying Fish (November 1999)
- Market Blues (February 2001)
- Walking Home With Marie-Claire (October 2002)
- A Penny to Remember (September 2007)
- The Red Camel (February 2009)

=== Non-fiction ===
- Strangers on Country, co-written with David Hartley (2020)
- Kids Who Did (2019)
- Topsy Turvy World (2013)
- Tough Stuff: True Stories About Kids and Courage (June 1999)
- Howard Florey Miracle Maker (October 1998)
- Man-eaters and Bloodsuckers (April 1998)

=== Picture books ===
- Puddle Hunters (2018)
- When Billy was a Dog (2019)
- Shadow Catchers (2023)
