= Someone Like Me (novel) =

1996 novel by Elaine Forrestal

- First edition
- Author: Elaine Forrestal
- Language: English
- Genre: Fiction
- Published: 1996 (Puffin Books)
- Publication place: Australia
- Media type: Print (Paperback)
- Pages: 162
- ISBN: 9780140380927
- OCLC: 988921332

Someone Like Me is a 1996 children's novel by Australian author Elaine Forrestal. It is about a boy 'Tas', who becomes friends with his neighbour, a girl called Enya.

== Plot ==
The main protagonist is Thomas Alexander St. John "Tas" Kennedy, a preteen boy. He lives on a farm in Australia with his parents and two sisters, and his dog, Reebok. He is also frequently subject to being transferred to a special school.

A Northern Irish girl called Enya Dunleavy moves in next door to Tas, and they quickly become friends. However, when they find a box full of explosives near their house, Enya is scared for reasons unknown to Tas.

One day, Tas tries to play a prank on the school bully, Darren "Dreadlock", but his teacher, Mr. McKinlay "Mac", takes the bait and faints, causing everyone to be sent home early. As Enya was absent, Tas goes to her house and notices her parents in an argument with another man, which ends with Tas being shot.

Tas is sent to the hospital, where he is nearly choked to death by Enya's uncle, Seamus, for spying on their argument, but is saved by Mr. Mac. The two of them spend weeks in the hospital together before returning to school. After a run-in with Dreadlock and his cronies, Tas meets up with Enya, who reveals that she was the one who shot Tas and that it was an accident.

After a good performance at a play of Peter and the Wolf, Tas is invited to audition for admittance to a music school. After the audition, he returns home to find Reebok dying after having eaten snail pellets. Seamus is later arrested for stockpiling ammonium nitrate, as well as his attempted murder of Tas. As a result, Enya's family becomes more accepting of visitors.

Tas is later awarded a scholarship to the music school. It is here that he reveals that he is blind.

== Reception ==
Someone Like Me won the West Australian Young Readers' Book Award in the Hoffman Award category in 1998. Someone Like Me won the 1998 Children's Book Council of Australia's Children's Book of the Year Award: Younger Readers award. A review in Bookbird noted the themes of school bullying, family relationships and violence in Ireland in Someone Like Me. Forrestal's "believable characters" have been praised, as well as the growing air of "menace" that mounts in Someone Like Me. In 2007, the book was used as stimulus for a two to four-week program of curriculum activities on violence in connection with the National Day of Reading, a joint initiative of the Australian Association for the Teaching of English (AATE) and the Australian Literacy Educators' Association (ALEA). Material relating to the publication of Someone Like Me, including draft manuscripts, newspaper clippings and reader correspondence is held in a collection of Elaine Forrestal's manuscripts by the State Library of Western Australia.

== See also ==
- The Troubles
