= Danny Katz =

Australian columnist and author (born 1963)

Danny Katz (born 1963) is a Canadian-born, Jewish Australian columnist and author who writes for The Age and the Sydney Morning Herald. His column was syndicated in The West Australian until its unexplained removal in 2016. He is the Modern Guru in the Good Weekend magazine, a parody on modern etiquette advice columns.

Originally from Canada, Katz's father had worked in Sri Lanka as a geologist, before moving to Sydney.

Living in Melbourne, Katz started out as a stand-up comedian and wrote columns for The Age since the mid-1990s before giving up his column in 2021.

Katz is also known as the author of the award-winning children's book series, Little Lunch, published by Black Dog Books and features illustrations by Katz's wife Mitch Vane, which has been adapted into television series Little Lunch.

Katz has two children.

== Bibliography ==
- 1999 – Spit the Dummy (ISBN 1864489448)
- 2002 – Dork Geek Jew (ISBN 1865087912)

Books for children (featuring illustrations by Mitch Vain)

- 2000 – Smart Alec (ISBN 0733916007)
- 2000 – The Incredible Something (ISBN 0733916090)
- 2001 – A Really Good Scare (ISBN 0733916171)
- 2006 – Big, Bad Bunnies (ISBN 0143302280)
- 2007 – A Little Election (ISBN 978-1921167591)
- 2008 – The Parents are Revolting (ISBN 978-0143303077)
- 2008 – The Little Lunch Games (ISBN 978-1742030241)
- 2011 – No-Thanks-Hanks and Other Unmannerly Tales (ISBN 978-1742485829)
- 2012 – Click, Clack: Buckled in Your Booster Seat (ISBN 978-1742035260)
- 2012 – That's the Sound the Street Makes (ISBN 978-1742035307)
- 2012 – S.C.U.M (ISBN 978-1742379241)
- 2013 – Mucked Up (ISBN 978-1742379258)
- 2013 – A Book About Scary (ISBN 978-1743460443)
- 2018 – The Poppa Platoon in Operation Dessert Storm (ISBN 978-1742769240)
- 2018 – The Poppa Platoon in World War Chew (ISBN 978-1742769189)
- 2019 – The Poppa Platoon in Saving Private Rabbit (ISBN 978-1742769257)

Little Lunch series

- The Slide
- The School Gate
- The Old Climbing Tree
- The Monkey Bars
- The Bubblers
- Triple the Treats
- Triple Snack Pack
- Triple the Trouble
- Triple the Laughs
- Triple the Games
- The Block B Roof
- The Off-limits Fence
- The Bin Shed
