= Darius Bell and the Glitter Pool =

2009 novel by Odo Hirsch

- Author: Odo Hirsch
- Language: English
- Genre: Children's novel
- Published: 2009 (Allen & Unwin)
- Publication place: Australia
- Media type: Print (paperback)
- Pages: 232
- ISBN: 9781741757163
- OCLC: 277160254
- Followed by: Darius Bell and the Crystal Bees

Darius Bell and the Glitter Pool is a 2009 children's novel by Australian author Odo Hirsch.

== Synopsis ==
Darius Bell and his family are living in the Bell estate, the mansion given to his ancestors, under the condition that every 25 years they would produce a gift for the town. The next gift (meant to be given by Darius’ father) is coming up shortly. Darius discovers that his father has no gift to give to the town and that his family is broke. Even though the gift can be anything, Darius’ father insists that the gift needs to be astonishing to honour the Bell name.

An earthquake occurs and Darius goes outside to assess the damage. He discovers that a hole in the ground ha opened up. Along with his two friends, Oliver and Paul, Darius goes down into the hole, and they discover what they believe to be rubies and gold. Darius is excited about the “gems” and believes that this Glitter Pool is the solution to all his problems, fantasizing about revealing the Glitter Pool to his parents. Darius decides that he needs to go to an expert to confirm the contents. He seeks help from a geology professor, Professor Heggarty, who breaks the truth to Darius and tells him that he has found limonite and vanadinite instead of rubies and gold.

Darius takes Marguerite down to the Glitter Pool and tells her that it is worthless. She then tells him that she prefers it that way, because if it had high financial value, all the gems would be removed, but this way, the beauty of it is intact and she can look at it. She specified that she would rather have this sight as a gift than any number of gems around her neck.

Darius decides that if Marguerite likes the Glitter Pool for its beauty, then others will too. He decides to give the town the gift of being able to see the Glitter Pool. But first, he needs to fix up the Glitter Pool so it is safe for visiting. After requesting help from friends to fix up the pool, Darius discovers that the Glitter Pool can’t be used as the gift because it is on the land that is part of the Bell estate. Darius and his family have no choice but to give a barrel of vegetables as their gift and the mayor starts mocking them, but then Hector (Darius’ father) stands up to Mayor Podcock. Darius then realises that an extreme gift wasn’t necessary, not even the Glitter Pool. He also learns that a gift is better given from free will rather than from obligation. Afterwards, as the Bells are driving home, they notice people are crowded around the Glitter Pool, and Darius’ parents find out about everything that Darius has done and are proud of him.

== Reception ==
A review in Booklist of Darius Bell and the Glitter Pool wrote ".. this gentle, appealing story would make a terrific read-aloud for a young audience.", and The Horn Book Magazine called it ".. a satisfying read." The School Library Journal found it ".. not religious, nor is it about any particular holiday, but it is a brilliant book to use and recommend for those who want to read about the true spirit of gift giving and receiving."

Darius Bell and the Glitter Pool has also been reviewed by Magpies, Kirkus Reviews, Australian Women Online, The Age, and Library Media Connection.

It won the 2010 CBCA Children's Book of the Year Award for Younger Readers.
