= Tashi (TV series) =

Australian animated television series

- Title card
- Genre: Animated
- Based on: Tashi by Anna Fienberg and Barbara Fienberg
- Directed by: Marc Wasik
- Voices of: James Buckingham; Leon Williams; Jacqueline Marriott
- Theme music composer: Caitlin Yeo; Jonathan Dower
- Opening theme: Tashi's World
- Countries of origin: Australia; Ireland
- Original language: English
- No. of seasons: 1
- No. of episodes: 52

Production
- Executive producers: Jim Ballantine; Chris Rose
- Producer: Barbara Stephen
- Running time: 11 minutes
- Production companies: Flying Bark Productions; Telegael; Discreet Art Productions

Original release
- Network: 7TWO
- Release: November 27, 2014 – January 8, 2015

Tashi is an Australian animated television series based on a series of Tashi books by mother and daughter Anna Fienberg and Barbara Fienberg and illustrated by Kim Gamble. It first screened on 7TWO in 2015 and was repeated on the ABC.

== Plot ==
Tashi's distant cousin Jack has been sent to stay with him. With the help of creature-whisperer Lotus Blossom, they encounter wild adventures filled with giants, ghosts, witches, bandits, demons and dragons.

== Characters ==
- Tashi (voiced by James Buckingham)
- Jack (voiced by Leon Williams)
- Lotus Blossom (voiced by Jacqueline Marriott)

== International ==
Tashi has also screened in Germany, France, Belgium, The Netherlands, UK and Ireland.

== Awards ==
- Nominated for "Most Outstanding Children's Program" at the 2015 Logie Awards (Australia)
- Nominated for "Best Children's Television Program" at the SPA Awards (Australia)
- Nominated for "Tricks For Kids" category at the Stuttgart Festival of Animated Film (Germany)
- Nominated for "Best Animation Series" at the AEAF Awards (Australia)
