= Kim Caraher =

Australian writer

- Born: Belfast, Northern Ireland
- Died: 19 May 2007 Australia
- Occupation: Author
- Genre: Children's fiction
- Years active: 1990s–2000s
- Notable works: The Cockroach Cup (1998); Zip Zap (2001)
- Notable awards: CBCA Notable Book (1998); Aurealis Award for Best Children's Short Fiction (2002)

Kim Caraher was an Australian author. She was born in Belfast, Northern Ireland, moved to Africa at age seven, and lived in three countries before settling in the Northern Territory, Australia. She died on 19 May 2007 after suffering from cancer for a long time. After Caraher died her son posted a blog of her death, along with blogs that she had written.

In 1998, she earned a Children's Book Council Notable Book award for The Cockroach Cup, which was also shortlisted for the 2000 West Australian Young Readers' Book Award. Also her book Zip Zap earned an Aurealis Award for Best Children's Short Fiction in 2002.

== Books ==
- There's a Bat on the Balcony (1994)
- My Teacher Turns Into a Tyrannosaurus (1996)
- Up A Gum Tree (1997)
- Yucky Poo (1998)
- The Cockroach Cup (1998)
- Goanna Anna (1999)
- Kakadu Nightmare (2001)
- Zip Zap (2001)
- Clinging To The Edge (2003)
- Mark Of The Beast (2004)
