= Bren MacDibble =

Australian author

- Born: 1966 (age 59–60); Whanganui, New Zealand
- Occupation: Writer
- Writing career
- Genres: Children's and young adult
- Website: macdibble.com calantheblack.com

Bren MacDibble (née McGregor; born 1966) is a New Zealand-born writer of children's and young adult books based in Australia. Bren also writes under the name Cally Black. She uses the alias to distinguish between books written for younger children (under the name Bren MacDibble) and books written for young adults (under the name Cally Black).

== Biography ==
MacDibble was born in Whanganui, New Zealand. She was raised on farms around the central North Island of New Zealand. Bren lived in Melbourne, Victoria, Australia for 20 years and now lives on the midwest coast of Western Australia.

In 2015, Bren won the Ampersand Prize with Hardie Grant Egmont for her first trade novel In the Dark Spaces. This was quickly followed by her first children's trade novel How to Bee with Allen & Unwin. Both books won New Zealand Book Awards in 2018. The first time any author has picked up awards in two different categories in the same year. How to Bee picked up a Children's Book Council of Australia (CBCA) Book of the Year - Younger readers that same year.

In 2018, Bren was awarded a Neilma Sidney Literary Travel Fund to research her children's novel The Dog Runner. It won the 2019 Aurealis Award for Best Children's Fiction, while The Apprentice Witnesser won the same award in 2024.

== Publications ==
- How to Bee (Allen & Unwin, Aus/NZ, 2017) (Old Barn Books, UK, 2018) (Groundwood Books, Can/US, 2020) La Deniere Abeille (Helium Editions, France, 2020)
- In the Dark Spaces (Hardie Grant Egmont, Aus/NZ 2017)
- The Dog Runner (Allen & Unwin, Aus/NZ, 2019) (Old Barn Books, UK, 2019)
- Across the Risen Sea (Allen & Unwin, Aus/NZ, 2020) (Old Barn Books, UK, 2020)
- The Raven's Song written with Zana Fraillon (Allen & Unwin, Aus/NZ, 2022) (Old Barn Books, UK, 2022)
- The Apprentice Witnesser (A&U Children's, 2024)

== Awards ==
- How to Bee
  - Winner: New Zealand Book Awards for Children and Young Adults - Junior Fiction (the Wright Family Foundation Esther Glen Award) 2018
  - Winner: Children's Book Council of Australia (CBCA) Book of the Year 2018 - Younger readers
  - Winner: Patricia Wrightson Prize, New South Wales Premier's Literary Awards, 2018
  - Shortlisted: South Australian Festival Literary Prize
  - Shortlisted: Norma K Heming Award 2018
  - Shortlisted: Aurealis Award
  - Shortlisted: Ditmar Award results 2018
  - Shortlisted: Book of the Year, Speech Pathology Australia
  - Longlisted: The North Somerset Teachers' Book Awards, UK, Moving On Category 2018
- In the Dark Spaces (as Cally Black)
  - Winner: Ampersand Prize with Hardie Grant Egmont
  - Winner: New Zealand Book Awards for Children and Young Adults - Young Adult Fiction (the Copyright Licensing NZ Award)
  - Winner: Queensland Literary Awards - Griffiths University Young Adult Book Award 2018
  - Winner: Aurealis Award for best young adult novel 2017
  - Honour Book: Children's Book Council of Australia (CBCA) 2018
  - Highly Commended: the Victorian Premier's Literary Prize
  - Shortlisted: West Australian Young Readers' Book Awards 2019
  - Shortlisted: YABBAs - Fiction for Years 7-9 2019
  - Shortlisted: Inky Award 2018
  - Shortlisted: Ditmar Award results 2018
  - Shortlisted: Ethel Turner Prize in the NSW Premiers Awards 2018
- The Dog Runner
  - Winner: New Zealand Book Awards for Children and Young Adults - Junior Fiction (the Wright Family Foundation Esther Glen Award) 2019
  - Winner: Aurealis Award for Best Children's Fiction 2019
  - Shortlisted: Children's Book Council of Australia, Book of the Year, Younger Readers
  - Shortlisted in the Readings Children's Book Prize 2020
  - Nominated for the 2020 CILIP Carnegie Medal
  - Shortlisted: The Yabba Awards
  - Honour Book: The Koala Awards
- Across the Risen Sea
  - Longlisted: UK Literary Association Awards 2022
  - Shortlisted: Western Australian Premier's Book Awards for Writing for Children 2020
  - Shortlisted: Aurealis Award for best children's fiction
  - Nominated for the 2021 CILIP Carnegie Medal
  - Shortlisted: Patricia Wrightson Prize, New South Wales Premier's Literary Awards, 2021
  - Shortlisted: New Zealand Book Awards for Children and Young Adults – Junior Fiction, 2021
  - Shortlisted: Speech Pathology Book of the Year Awards 2021
  - A Children's Book Council of Australia Notable Book 2021
  - Shortlisted: The Yabba Awards
- The Raven's Song (with Zana Fraillon)
  - Honour Book in the 2023 CBCA Children's Book of the Year Award: Younger Readers
  - Shortlisted: Aurealis Award for best children's fiction
  - Shortlisted: Western Australian Premier's Book Awards for Writing for Children 2023
- The Apprentice Witnesser
  - Shortlisted: New Zealand Book Awards for Children and Young Adults, Wright Family Foundation Esther Glen Junior Fiction Award 2025
  - Winner: Aurealis Award for best children's fiction 2024
  - Shortlisted: Western Australian Premier's Book Awards for Writing for Children 2025
  - Shortlisted: The Wilderness Society Environment Award for Children's Literature 2025
