= Elaine Forrestal =

Western Australian children's writer

- Born: 1941 (age 84–85); Perth, Western Australia
- Education: Edith Cowan University; University of Western Australia
- Occupation: Writer
- Writing career
- Years active: 1983–present
- Genres: Children's literature Young adult fiction
- Notable works: Someone Like Me; The Watching Lake; Leaving No Footprints; Goldfields Girl
- Notable awards: CBCA Book of the Year: Younger Readers (1998); West Australian Young Readers' Book Award – Hoffman Award (1997); Muriel Barwell Award for Distinguished Service to Children's Literature (2012)

Elaine Forrestal (born 1941) is a Western Australian writer of books for children and young adults, including her 1996 book, Someone Like Me.

== Career ==
Elaine Forrestal was born in Perth, Western Australia in 1941. She graduated with a Bachelor of Education and Diploma of Teaching from Edith Cowan University. She worked as a school teacher prior to taking up full-time writing in 1999. She also holds a higher degree in creative writing from the University of Western Australia.

Forrestal began publishing short stories in 1983. The Watching Lake, published in 1991, was her first novel and was shortlisted for the 1992 Western Australian Premier's Book Awards.

In 2012 Forrestal was presented with the Muriel Barwell Award for Distinguished Service to Children's Literature by the Western Australian branch of the Children's Book Council of Australia.

Her papers, including manuscripts and correspondence, are held in the State Library of Western Australia.

== Awards and recognition ==
=== Someone Like Me ===
- Winner, West Australian Young Readers' Book Award – Hoffman Award, 1997
- Winner, CBCA Children's Book of the Year Award: Younger Readers, 1998
- Shortlisted, YABBA – Fiction for Older Readers, 1999

== Selected works ==
- The Watching Lake, Puffin, 1991
- Someone Like Me, Puffin, 1996
- Leaving No Footprints, Puffin, 2001
- Miss Llewellyn Jones, Fremantle Press, 2008
- Black Jack Anderson, Penguin, 2008
- Goldfields Girl, Fremantle Press, 2020
