= The Magnificent Nose and Other Marvels =

1991 children's picture book by Anna Fienberg

- Author: Anna Fienberg
- Illustrator: Kim Gamble
- Cover artist: Kim Gamble
- Genre: Children's picture book
- Publisher: Allen & Unwin
- Publication date: 1991
- Publication place: Australia
- Media type: Paperback
- Pages: 48
- ISBN: 1-86373-110-5

The Magnificent Nose and Other Marvels is a children's picture book written by Anna Fienberg and illustrated by Kim Gamble. It won the 1992 Children's Book of the Year Award for Younger Readers, and the 1992 Crichton Award for Children's Book Illustration. It tells five interconnected stories about children with unusual gifts.

== Plot ==
The book is divided into six parts. Each of the first five parts tells the story of a character, and the final part features all of the main characters together.

=== Lindalou ===
Lindalou is born with a golden hammer and nail, the use of which is her main interest. She learns to make wooden boxes, and meets Aristan, a magic spider. After making a trio of boxes, she opens them to find more tiny golden tools: a saw, a clamp and a plane. With these tools, she builds a house in the shape of a boat. Lindalou's story ends when she and her family fly the boat to Kathmandu.

=== Andy Umm ===
The timid boy Andy Umm becomes a Cleaner and Animal Feeder at Silliaza Circus. The lion tamer at the circus, Sir. Leonard, refuses to work with the bad-tempered lion Fidel the Ferocious, and leaves. Andy, who can speak to animals, is told by Aristan that Fidel is troubled by the departure of his friend Daphne, a mouse. So Andy finds Daphne in a field, who returns to the circus, appeasing Fidel. The circus show that night is successful, and Andy is made Head Lion Tamer of the circus.

=== Curious Ferdinand ===
Ferdinand Feedelbenz, a very curious boy, is fascinated by the human body. One day, he is given spectacles that allow him to see inside the bodies of others and diagnose their illnesses. He becomes a famous doctor, and is called to see the Prime Minister of the land. Aristan is found to be inside the Prime Minister's ear.

=== Ignatius Binz ===
Ignatius Binz grows up in a perfume factory, and has a highly sensitive nose. After meeting Aristan, Ignatius eaves home and searches for adventure. After successfully preventing a fire in a bottled gas factory, Ignatius becomes captain of a fire brigade.

=== Valentina Lookwell ===
Acting upon the advice of Aristan, Valentina Lookwell makes paintings that reflect the inner characters of people. After resolving a conflict between a postman and dog, it is discovered that Sir. Grimbald, the landlord of the street, is intending to replace the existing homes with a Crocodile Park. After Valentina makes a painting for Mr. Grimbald, the plans to replace the street are dropped.

=== The Last Word ===
Lindalou, Andy, Ferdinand, Ignatius and Valentina gather on an aeroplane and meet Aristan and a writer. The writer is implied to be the author of the book.
