= 友達 =

友達 may refer to:

- AUO Corporation, Taiwanese company
- Tomodachi (disambiguation), Japanese transliterated which means "friend".
