= Tamagotchi (disambiguation) =

Tamagotchi is a handheld digital pet created in Japan.

Tamagotchi may also refer to:

- Tamagotchi!, a TV series based on the digital pet
- "Tamagotchi" (song), by Omar Apollo, 2022

== See also ==
- Tamagotchi (Tschoopapa...), a song by Squeezer
- "Tamagochi", a song by Lola Índigo from La niña
- Tomodachi (disambiguation)
