= Deborah Abela =

Australian author (born 1966)

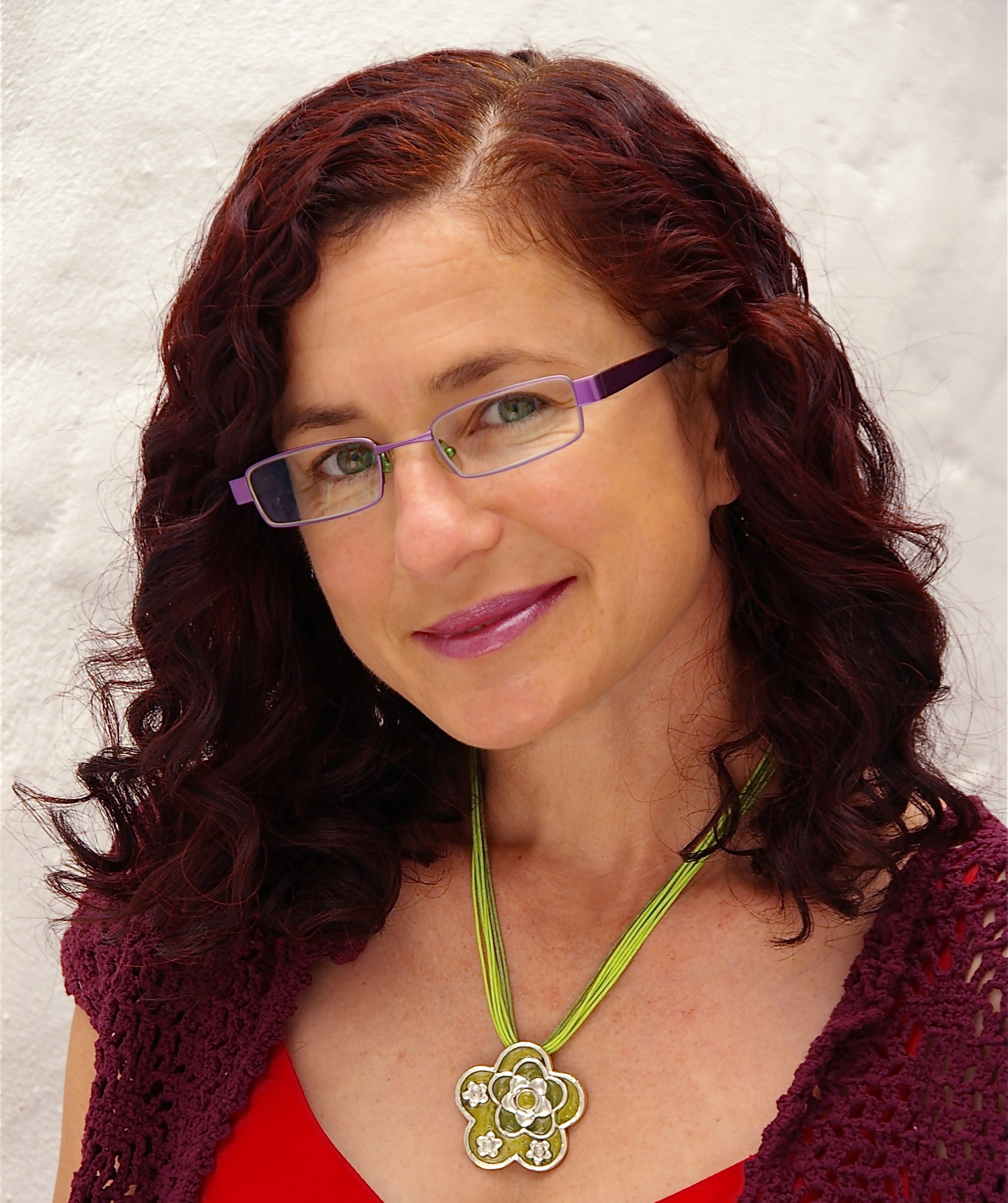
- Deborah Abela; Self-portrait photograph
- Born: 13 October 1966 (age 60); Sydney, New South Wales, Australia
- Occupation: Writer
- Writing career
- Genre: Children's literature
- Notable awards: Shortlisted REAL awards 2015, 2014, 2012, 2011 Maurice Saxby Award for Services to Children's Literature 2013, Sisters in Crime Davitt Awards 2013, Shortlisted Aurealis Awards 2011, 2010, 2003, Shortlisted Speech Pathology Awards 2011, Shortlisted USBBY Outstanding International Book 2012, Children's Book Council Notable Book 2010
- Website: deborahabela.com

Deborah Abela (born 13 October 1966) is an Australian author of children's books, most notably the Max Remy, Super Spy series, Grimsdon and Teresa – A New Australian. She was born in Sydney, Australia, and has been writing for 15 years. She does the Virtual Book Week Dart Session for kids.

== Awards ==
- 2026 CBCA (NSW) Lady Cutler Award for Distinguished Services to Children's Literature
- 2017 KOALA Legend (Kids Own Literature Awards)
- 2017, 2012, 2011 Grimsdon Shortlisted for YABBA and KOALA awards
- 2017 Teresa – A New Australian Shortlisted for WAYRBA Awards (Western Australian Young Readers Book Awards)
- 2017 Teresa – A New Australian Best Book in Translation, Malta Book Awards
- 2017 The Stupendously Spectacular Spelling Bee shortlisted for the Australian Family Therapists Awards
- 2015 Ghost Club series shortlisted for KOALA, YABBA, CROC awards
- 2015 New City shortlisted for the KOALA, YABBA, CROC awards
- 2013 Ghost Club series shortlisted for Sisters In Crime Davitt Awards
- 2013 Maurice Saxby Award for Services to Children's Literature
- 2012 The Remarkable Secret of Aurelie Bonhoffen shortlisted Outstanding International Book Award USBBY
- 2011 Grimsdon awarded Most Enthralling Junior Fiction Award
- 2011 Grimsdon shortlisted Aurealis Awards
- 2011 Grimsdon shortlisted Speech Pathology Awards
- 2010 The Remarkable Secret of Aurelia Bonhoffen, was shortlisted for best children's book in the 2010, and was awarded "Notable Book of 2010" by the Children's Book Council of Australia.
- 2010 The Remarkable Secret of Aurelie Bonhoffen shortlisted for the Aurealis Awards
- 2010, 2007, 2005 Max Remy Superspy voted best series KOALA and YABBA awards
- 2008 Max Remy Superspy Angus and Robertson's Top 50 books
- 2007 Max Remy Superspy shortlisted USA Children's Choice Awards and WAYRBA awards

In 2008, she was awarded the May Gibbs Fellowship for Children's Literature.

Awarded the 2006 Oppenheim Toy Portfolio Gold Seal Best Book Award.

== Bibliography ==
=== Max Remy Superspy Books ===
- In Search of the Time and Space Machine – Random House (Milsons Point, NSW) (2002) ISBN 978-1-74051-765-2
- Spyforce Revealed – Random House (Milsons Point, NSW) (2002) ISBN 1-74051-766-0
- The Nightmare Vortex – Random House (Milsons Point, NSW) (2003) ISBN 1-74051-858-6
- The Hollywood Mission – Random House (Milsons Point, NSW) (2003) ISBN 1-74051-859-4
- The Amazon Experiment – Random House (Milsons Point, NSW) (2004) ISBN 1-74051-912-4
- Blue's Revenge – Random House (Milsons Point, NSW) (2004) ISBN 1-74051-913-2
- The Venice Job – Random House (Milsons Point, NSW) (2005) ISBN 1-74166-031-9
- Mission in Malta – Random House (Milsons Point, NSW) (2006) ISBN 1-74166-065-3
- The French Code – Random House (Milsons Point, NSW) (2007) ISBN 978-1-74166-119-4
- The Final Curtain – Random House (Milsons Point, NSW) (2008) ISBN 978-1-74166-125-5

=== Jasper Zammit Soccer Legend ===
- The Game of Life with Johnny Warren – Random House (Milsons Point, NSW) (2005) ISBN 978-1-74166-066-1
- The Striker with Johnny Warren – Random House (Milsons Point, NSW) (2005) ISBN 1-74166-086-6
- The Finals with Johnny Warren – Random House (Milsons Point, NSW) (2006) ISBN 1-74166-100-5

=== Other books ===
- Wolfie – An Unlikely Hero, Penguin Random House (North Sydney, NSW) (2017) ISBN 9780143781509
- The Stupendously Spectacular Spelling Bee Penguin Random House (North Sydney, NSW) (2017) ISBN 978-1-925324-82-2
- Teresa – A New Australian - Scholastic Australia (2016) ISBN 978-1-74299-094-1
- New City – Random House (North Sydney, NSW) (2014) ISBN 978-1-74275-855-8
- Jasper Zammit – Soccer Legend (Bind-up 3 books in 1) Random House (North Sydney, NSW) (2014)
- Grimsdon – Random House (North Sydney, NSW) (2010)
- The Remarkable Secret of Aurelie Bonhoffen – Random House (North Sydney, NSW) (2009) ISBN 978-1-74166-095-1
- The Ghosts of Gribblesea Pier – Farrar, Straus and Giroux (US) (2011) ISBN 978-0374362393
- Bug Club Charlie and Alice – Heinemann Secondary Education (2012) ISBN 978-0435075934
- Ghost Club 1: The New Kid – Random House (2012) ISBN 9781742750804
- Ghost Club 2: The Haunted School – Random House (2012) ISBN 978-1-74275-083-5
- Ghost Club 3: A Transylvanian Tale – Random House (2013) ISBN 978-1-74275-853-4
