= Colin Thompson (writer) =

Writer and illustrator of children's books

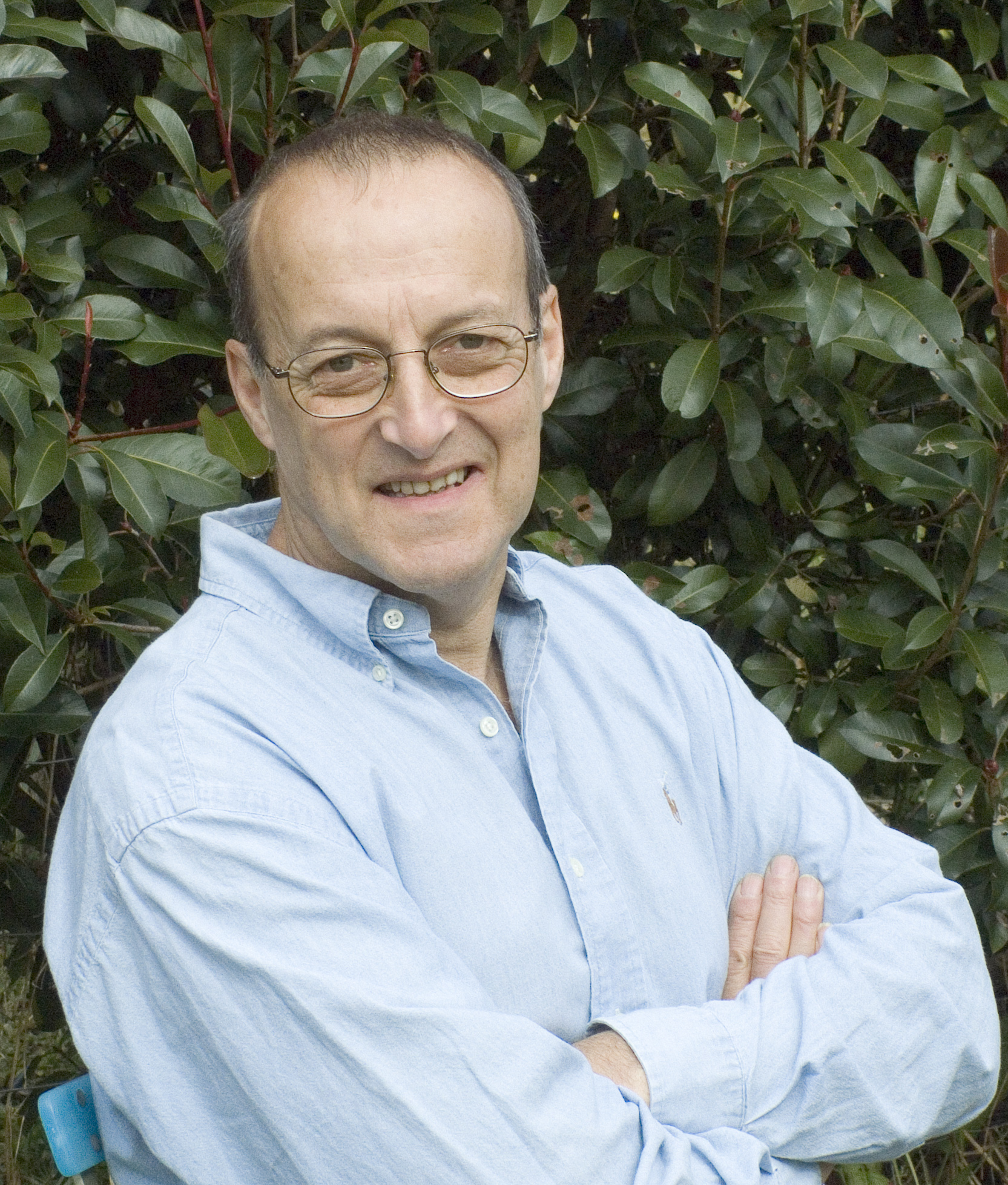
- Born: Colin Edward Willment; 18 October 1942 (age 83); Ealing, Middlesex, UK
- Occupations: Writer, illustrator
- Writing career
- Period: 1990–present
- Genres: Children's books, poetry, young adult novels, picture books

Colin Edward Thompson (born 18 October 1942) is an English-Australian writer and illustrator of children's books. He has had over 70 works published and also draws pictures for jigsaw puzzles. In 2004, Thompson was awarded the Aurealis Award in the children's long fiction category for his novel How to Live Forever.

== Early life and careers ==
Colin Edward Thompson was born on 18 October 1942 in Ealing, then in Middlesex and now in west London, United Kingdom. His mother changed his surname to Thompson when she remarried in 1953. Thompson states that he only met his father once, when he was nineteen. Thompson attended boarding school in Yorkshire and later a grammar school in West London.

Thompson studied art for two years at college in Ealing and Hammersmith, where he met his first wife. He worked as a silk-screen printer and a graphic designer for a while, before attending London Film School and working on documentaries for the BBC. After a divorce, he married a second time and after living briefly in Mallorca in 1968, moved to the Outer Hebrides. He and his wife set up a business as ceramicists, continuing the profession after moving to Cumbria in 1975. Thompson has one daughter from his first marriage and two from his second. He moved to Australia in 1995 and gained Australian citizenship. In 1999 he married Anne, an Australian librarian who had arranged for him to visit a Sydney school.

== Writing and illustration career ==
Thompson's career as a writer and illustrator began quite late in his life. He first took black-and-white illustrations to a publisher in 1990, assuming a story would be written by someone else to go with his images. He was, however, instructed to write the story himself and re-do his illustrations in colour. His first picture book was published in 1991, Ethel the Chicken. As of 2015, he has had over 70 books published. Many of them are books for children and are self-illustrated. He has also published a few series of novels for pre-teens and young adults.

Thompson's detailed, whimsical, colourful illustrations are popular as jigsaw puzzles and cross stitch kits with many of his works featured in jigsaws by Ravensburger and cross stitch kits by GeckoRouge.

== Awards ==
Colin Thompson's first literary recognition came in 1995 when Ruby was awarded the English 4–11 Picture Book Award by the English Association.

In 1999 Staircase Cat was shortlisted in the picture book category for the Children's Book of the Year Award by the Children's Book Council of Australia. In the following years, Thompson had success in this category four more times, winning the award for best picture book in 2006 with The Short and Incredibly Happy Life of Riley. His titles that were finalists in other years are The Violin Man, Dust, and The Big Little Book of Happy Sadness, in 2004, 2008, and 2009 respectively.

In 2004, Thompson's novel How to Live Forever was awarded the Aurealis Award in the children's long fiction category. The Floods Family Files was a finalist in the best graphic novel category in 2008. Thompson was added to the International Board on Books for Young People honour list in 2002 for his illustrations in Falling Angels.

Castles was awarded the Hampshire Illustrated Book Award in 2007.

== Publications ==
=== Children's stories ===
Picture books (self-illustrated)

1. Ethel the Chicken (1991)
2. A Giant Called Norman Mary (1991)
3. The Paper Bag Prince (1992)
4. Pictures of Home (1993)
5. Looking for Atlantis (1993)
6. Sid the Mosquito and Other Wild Stories (1993)
7. Ruby (1994)
8. Attila the Bluebottle and More Wild Stories (1995)
9. How to Live Forever (1996)
10. Venus the Caterpillar and Further Wild Stories (1996)
11. The Haunted Suitcase and Other Stories (1996)
12. The Tower to the Sun (1996)
13. Castle Twilight and Other Stories (1997)
14. The Paradise Garden (1998)
15. The Last Alchemist (1999)
16. Falling Angels (2001)
17. Violin Man (2003)
18. Castles (2006)
19. Sometimes Love is Under Your Foot (2008)
20. The Big Little Book of Happy Sadness (2008)
21. Wild Stories (2009) (contains previously published material)
22. Free to a Good Home (2009)
23. The Naughty Corner (2011)
24. Barry (2011)

Picture books

1. Sailing Home (1996) (with illustrator Matt Ottley)
2. The Last Circus (1997) (with illustrator Kim Gamble)
3. The Staircase Cat (1998) (with illustrator Anna Pignataro)
4. The Puzzle Duck (1999) (with illustrator Emma Quay)
5. Unknown (2000) (with illustrator Anna Pignataro)
6. The Last Clown (2001) (with illustrator Penelope Gamble)
7. No Place Like Home (2001) (with illustrator Anna Pignataro)
8. One Big Happy Family (2002) (with illustrator Karen Carter)
9. Round and Round and Round and Round (2002) (with illustrator Penelope Gamble)
10. Gilbert (2003) (with illustrator Chris Mould)
11. The Great Montefiasco (2005) (with illustrator Ben Redlich)
12. The Short and Incredibly Happy Life of Riley (2005) (with illustrator Amy Lissiat)
13. Gilbert Goes Outside (2005) (with illustrator Chris Mould)
14. Norman and Brenda (2006) (with illustrator Amy Lissiat)
15. Dust (2007) (with thirteen illustrators)
16. Fearless (2009) (with illustrator Sarah Davis)
17. The Bicycle (2011) (with fifteen illustrators)
18. Fearless in Love (2012) (with illustrator Sarah Davis)
19. Fearless: Sons and Daughter (2015) (with illustrator Sarah Davis)

Children's poetry

1. The Dog's Been Sick in the Honda (1999) (with illustrator Peter Viska) (revised in 2000 as Fish Are So Stupid with illustrator Chris Mould)
2. My Brother Drinks out of the Toilet (2000) (with illustrator Peter Viska)
3. There's Something Really Nasty on the Bottom of My Shoe (2003) (with illustrator Peter Viska)

=== Young adult fiction ===
Novels

1. Castle Twilight (1997)
2. Future Eden (1999)
3. Pepper Dreams (2003)
4. How to Live Forever (2004) (based on Thompson's picture book of same title)
5. Future Eden 2: Space: the Final Effrontery (2005)
6. The Second Forever (2012)

The Floods series

1. Neighbours (2005)
2. Playschool (2006)
3. Home and Away (2006)
4. Survivor (2007)
5. Prime Suspect (2007)
6. The Great Outdoors (2008)
7. Top Gear (2008)
8. Better Homes and Gardens (2009)
9. Who Wants to Be a Billionaire (2010)
10. Lost (2011)
11. Disasterchef (2012)
12. Bewitched (2013)
13. The Royal Family (2014)
14. The Floods Family Files (2007)
15. The Amazing Illustrated Floodsopedia (2012)

The Dragons series

1. Camelot (2009)
2. Excalibur (2010)
3. Mordred (2011)

Watch This Space series

1. Out to Launch (2015)

=== Fiction ===
1. Laughing for Beginners (2002)
