= Catherine Bateson =

Australian writer

- Born: 1960 (age 65–66); Sydney, New South Wales, Australia
- Education: Bachelor of Arts (Art History), University of Queensland
- Occupations: Writer, poet, educator
- Years active: 1990–present
- Notable work: Painted Love Letters (2002); Rain May and Captain Daniel (2002); Being Bee (2006); Lisette's Paris Notebook (2017)
- Children: 2
- Awards: CBCA Book of the Year (Younger Readers) (2003, 2006); John Shaw Neilson Award for Poetry

Catherine Bateson (born 1960 in Sydney) is an Australian writer.

== Career ==
Born in Sydney in 1960, Bateson grew up in a second-hand bookshop in Brisbane. She attained a Bachelor of Arts from the University of Queensland, with a major in art history.

Her first published novel was Painted Love Letters, a portrait of a family coping with death. She has published two volumes of poetry, and three verse novels for young adults using a variety of poetic forms including haiku, free verse, free renga and acrostic.

Bateson has taught creative writing for the past thirteen years, and has been a guest writer at many schools. Her work has been read on radio and featured on television. She has also appeared at various poetry and writers festivals throughout Australia. She coordinated La Mama Poetica at La Mama Theatre in Melbourne.

Bateson is the mother of two children, Alasdair, born in 1991 and Helen, born 1992.

She currently teaches creative writing at GippsTafe, Victoria and lives in the Dandenong Ranges, Victoria.

== Bibliography ==
- Pomegranates from the Underworld (1990)
- The Vigilant Heart (1998)
- A Dangerous Girl (2000) ( Catherine's 1st published novel )
- The Year It All Happened (2001)
- Painted Love Letters (2002)
- Rain May and Captain Daniel (2002)
- The Airdancer of Glass (2004)
- Millie and the Night Heron (2005)
- His Name in Fire (2006)
- Being Bee (2006)
- The Wish Pony, Woolshed Press (2008)
- Magenta McPhee, Woolshed Press (2009)
- Marriage for Beginners: And other poems, John Leonard Press (2009)
- Mimi and the Blue Slave, Woolshed Press (2010)
- Hanging Out, Omnibus Books (2010)
- Star, Omnibus Books (2012)
- Lisette's Paris Notebook, Allen & Unwin (2017)

== Awards and nominations ==
"This is a Poem..."
John Shaw Neilson Award for poetry

2003 – Rain May and Captain Daniel
winner of the Children's Book of the Year Award: Younger Readers
shortlisted for New South Wales Premier's Literary Awards, Patricia Wrighton Prize for Children's Literature
Queensland Premier's Literary Awards, Children's Book Award

2003 – Painted Love Letters
winner 2003 Australian Family Therapists' Award for Children's Literature
2003 shortlisted for the New South Wales Premier's Literary Awards, Ethel Turner Prize for young people's literature
2003 Honour Book Children's Book of the Year Award: Older Readers

2005 – Millie and the Night Heron
2006 Honour Book Children's Book of the Year Award: Younger Readers

2006 – The Stray Dogs Cafe
2006 FAW Mary Grant Bruce Short Story Award For Children's Literature

2007 – Being Bee
2007 Winner Children's Book of the Year Award: Younger Readers

2009 – The Wish Pony, Woolshed Press
2009 Honour Book Children's Book of the Year Award: Younger Readers
