= Falling from Grace (novel) =

Book by Jane Godwin

- First edition
- Author: Jane Godwin
- Language: English
- Genre: Fiction, Mystery
- Publisher: Penguin Australia
- Publication date: 2006
- Publication place: Australia
- Media type: Print (hardcover)
- Pages: 187
- ISBN: 978-0-8234-2105-3
- OCLC: 81916765
- LC Class: PZ7.G54377 Fal 2007

Falling from Grace is a mystery novel for young adults by Jane Godwin. It is set in Victoria, Australia and was first published in 2006.

It is studied at Years 7 and 8 level.

== Plot summary ==
Young sisters Annie and Grace squeeze in one last game of "Tracking" with their dad at the seashore, the beach by Point Nepean. There is a storm coming and it is getting dark. Annie, younger by eleven months and more agile than Grace, scrambles up the side of a steep hill. Grace struggles to follow when suddenly the ground falls away. The search for her begins, but is hampered by bad weather. The police become convinced that the young man, Kip, who found Grace's backpack on the beach, and Ted, who was too inebriated to remember much of what he did that night on the beach, may have had something to do with her disappearance. The police initially are unable to successfully interrogate Ted, but as the story is gradually assembled, it looks worse and worse for Kip and Ted, the longer Grace cannot be found.

== Writing style ==
Falling from Grace is written in alternating narration between Kip, Grace and Annie (Grace's younger sister). Only 3 short chapters are narrated by Grace. They are not very clear either since she has been lost for a few days.

== Reception ==
Kirkus Reviews wrote "Annie and Kip tell this riveting story of disappearance and search in alternating voices laced with insights about their own journey from innocence to experience."

== Awards ==
- Queensland Premier's Award (Children's Books)
- NSW State Literary Award
