= Anna Fienberg =

Australian writer

Anna Fienberg AM
- Born: 1956 (age 69–70); England
- Writing career
- Genres: Young adult fiction, children's literature

Anna Fienberg AM is an Australian writer of young adult fiction and children's literature.

== Biography ==
Fienberg was born in 1956 in England before moving to Australia at the age of three. She has worked as an editor for School Magazine. In 1988 her first work was published, entitled Billy Bear and the Wild Winter. In 1989 Fienberg released her first novel, The Nine Lives of Balthazar. She has won the Children's Book of the Year Award: Younger Readers in 1992 for The Magnificent Nose and Other Marvels and has been a short-list nominee on four other occasions. Fienberg has also won the Alan Marshall Award for Children's Literature in 1993 for Ariel, Zed & the Secret of Life and the 2003 Aurealis Award for best children's short fiction for Tashi and the Haunted House. She has also been an Aurealis Award finalist on four other occasions. Fienberg was made a Member of the Order of Australia (AM) in the 2019 Queen's Birthday Honours in recognition of her "significant service to literature as an author".

== Bibliography ==
=== Novels ===
- The Nine Lives of Balthazar (1989, with Donna Gynell)
- Ariel, Zed and the Secret of Life (1992, Kim Gamble)
- Power to Burn (1995)
- Borrowed Light (1999)
- The Witch in the Lake (2001)
- Horrendo's Curse (2002)
- Number 8 (2007)

=== Chapter books ===
Tashi (with Barbara Fienberg and Kim Gamble)

- Tashi (1995)
- Tashi and the Giants (1995)
- Tashi and the Ghosts (1996)
- Tashi and the Genie (1997)
- Tashi and the Baba Yaga (1998)
- Tashi and the Demons (1999)
- Tashi and the Big Stinker (2001)
- Tashi and the Dancing Shoes (2002)
- Tashi and the Haunted House (2002)
- Tashi and the Royal Tomb (2003)
- There Once Was a Boy Called Tashi (2003)
- Tashi Lost in the City (2004)
- Tashi and the Forbidden Room (2005)
- Tashi and the Stolen Bus (2006)
- Tashi and the Mixed-up Monster (2007)
- Tashi and the Phoenix (2008)
- Tashi and the Golem (2009)

Other books

- Billy Bear and the Wild Winter (1988)
- Wiggy and Boa (1988, with Ann James)
- Dead Sailors Don't Bite (1996, with Ann James)
- Pirate Trouble for Wiggy and Boa (1996, with Ann James)

=== Collections ===
- X-Change: Stories for a New Century (2000)
- The Big, Big, Big Book of Tashi (2001, with Barbara Fienberg and Kim Gamble). Includes Tashi (1995), Tashi and the Giants (1995), Tashi and the Ghosts (1996), Tashi and the Genie (1997), Tashi and the Baba Yaga (1998), Tashi and the Demons (1999), Tashi and the Big Stinker (2001).
- Tashi: 2 Books in One (2003, with Barbara Fienberg)
- The Second Big Big Book of Tashi (2006, with Barbara Fienberg and Kim Gamble). Includes Tashi and the Dancing Shoes (2002), Tashi and the Haunted House (2002), Tashi and the Royal Tomb (2003), Tashi Lost in the City (2004), and Tashi and the Forbidden Room (2005).
- The Great Big Enormous Book of Tashi (Tashi #1–16)
- Minton Goes!: Underwater & Home at Last (2008, with Kim Gamble)
- Minton Goes!: Driving and Trucking (2008, with Kim Gamble)
- Minton Goes!: Sailing and Flying (2008, with Kim Gamble)

=== Picture books ===
Minton (with Kim Gamble)

- Minton Goes Flying (1998)
- Minton Goes Sailing (1998)
- Minton Goes Driving (1999)
- Minton Goes Trucking (1999)
- Minton Goes Home (2000)
- Minton Goes Under (2000)

Other books

- The Magnificent Nose and Other Marvels (1991, with Kim Gamble)
- The Hottest Boy Who Ever Lived (1995, with Kim Gamble)
- Madeline the Mermaid and Other Fishy Tales (1995, with Ann James)
- Joseph (2001, with Kim Gamble)

=== Short fiction ===
- "Eyeball to Eyeball" in Weird: Twelve Incredible Tales (ed. Penny Matthews)

=== Other works ===
- Eddie (1988)
- Con the Whiz Kid (1989, with Felicity Meyer and the Roads & Traffic Authority)
- The Champion (1989, with Felicity Meyer and the Roads & Traffic Authority)
- My Goldie (1989, with Felicity Meyer and the Roads & Traffic Authority)
- Stefano's Nonna (1989, with Felicity Meyer and the Roads & Traffic Authority)
- A Teddy for Louise, Please (1994, with Felicity Meyer and the Roads & Traffic Authority)
- Snugglepot and Cuddlepie (1997, with Vicky Kitanov)
- Snugglepot and Cuddlepie Meet Little Obelia (1997, with Vicky Kitanov and May Gibbs)
- Snugglepot and Cuddlepie at Sea (1997, with Vicky Kitanov)
- Cuddlepie Goas to the Dentist (1997, with Vicky Kitanov and May Gibbs)
- The world of May Gibbs (1997, with May Gibbs and Vicky Kitanov)
- The Doll's Secret (1997, with Australia Post)
- Snugglepot and Cuddlepie and the Banksia Men (1997, with Vicky Kitanov and May Gibbs)
- Snugglepot and Cuddlepie Go Home (1997, with Vicky Kitanov and May Gibbs)
- Hans Christian Andersen's Thumbelina (2002, with Mark Jackson, Heather Potter, HC Andersen)
- Escape (2009)
- The Amazing Tashi Activity Book (2009, with Barbara Fienberg and Kim Gamble)

=== Animation ===
- Tashi (2014-2015, Seven Network)

== Nominations and awards ==
Alan Marshall Award

- Children's Literature
  - 1993: Win: Ariel, Zed & the Secret of Life

Aurealis Awards

- Best children's short fiction
  - 2002: Win: Tashi and the Haunted House
  - 2003: Nomination: Tashi and the Royal Tomb
  - 2004: Nomination: There Was Once a Boy Called Tashi
  - 2007: Nomination: Tashi and the Mixed-up Monster
- Best young-adult novel
  - 2001: Nomination: The Witch in the Lake

CBCA Book of the Year Award

- Older Readers
  - 1999: Nomination: Borrowed Light
- Younger Readers
  - 1988: Nomination: Wiggy and Boa
  - 1992: Win: The Magnificent Nose and Other Marvels
  - 1996: Nomination: Tashi
  - 2001: Nomination: Joseph
  - 2014
