= Garden of the Purple Dragon =

Book by Carole Wilkinson

Dragon Keeper: Garden of the Purple Dragon
- Author: Carole Wilkinson
- Language: English
- Series: Dragonkeeper
- Genre: Children's fantasy novel
- Publisher: Black Dog Books
- Publication date: September 2005
- Publication place: Australia
- Media type: Print (hardback)
- Pages: 352 pp (first edition, hardback)
- ISBN: 0-330-44111-6
- OCLC: 73954463
- Preceded by: Dragonkeeper
- Followed by: Dragon Moon

Dragon Keeper: Garden of the Purple Dragon is a children's fantasy novel by Carole Wilkinson, published in September 2005 by Macmillan Publishers. It is the second book in the Dragonkeeper series and is followed by Dragon Moon. It is set in ancient China, during the Han dynasty, and continues the story of Ping, a slave girl turned dragonkeeper.

== Plot ==
Ping is living on the top of Tai Shan mountain trying to raise Kai, Danzi's son. Ping learns that Kai can shape-change and turns into firstly a soup ladle. They are living happily until one day their goat is found with its throat slit. Hua also returns to Ping on a red phoenix's back. Ping and Kai flee but they run into the necromancer. After Hua uses his newfound powers to hold off the necromancer while Ping and Kai escape, Ping, Kai and Hua are later captured by guards and taken to Liu Che, Emperor of China, and Ping's 'friend' who drops all charges against them. Ping stays in the palace and meets Princess Yangxin and the two become friends, and the Princess begins to teach Ping how to read and write, since she is unable to do so already. Ping eventually convinces the Emperor to search for any other Dragon Keepers, as she hopes to find her family. She, Kai and Dong Fang Suo (Fatso as Kai had begun to call him) go to the village in search of the next Dragon Keeper, but they do not find Ping's family there, but a boy named Jun who is taken to be instructed as a Dragonkeeper. Ping becomes jealous when Kai seems to prefer Jun over her. During the journey back to the palace, Ping is nearly killed in an accident and left for dead, but she survives and finds her real family. After staying with them for a short time, she decides to return to the palace for Kai, but the Necromancer is there, bleeding Kai. They duel and Ping, without Kai, escapes to warn the Emperor who reveals that he is in league with the Necromancer. She is stripped of her position as Imperial Dragonkeeper and taken off to be sacrificed. During the sacrifice, Dong Fang Suo, Jun, Hua and Kai come to her aid and they defeat the necromancer though Dong Fang Suo is killed (who says it was the Emperor who ordered him and the necromancer to make the accident that almost killed Ping before he dies). While Jun takes his body away, Ping and Kai (Ping had let Hua go free with other rats) escape with Princess Yangxin, who asks them to go with her to the Duke's at the Kunlun Mountains, and the two agree, hoping to find a place to live in safety from the Empire.

== Awards ==
Awards for Dragon Keeper: Garden of the Purple Dragon
Year	Award	Result	Ref.
2006	COOL (Canberra's Own Outstanding List) Award	Shortlist	
2006	Kids Own Australian Literary Awards (KOALA)	Shortlist	
2006	Queensland Premier's Literary Awards	Shortlist	
2006	West Australian Young Book Readers Awards	Winner	

== Reception ==
Booklist's Sally Estes wrote: "This sequel to Dragon Keeper (2005) is as exciting as its predecessor, and once again the tightly bonded relationship between girl and a dragon forms the story's appealing heart".

School Library Journal's Quinby Frank highlighted the novel's protagonist, calling Ping "an appealingly feisty heroine". Frank also noted that "the dragon's baby talk that Ping hears inside her head makes him seem more real, if a bit silly". Frank also praised Wilkinson's ability to "a vivid picture of life in the Imperial Ming Yang Lodge" but warned about some of the "horrifyingly graphic" scenes related to "the necromancer's practices".

In contrast, Kirkus Reviews called the novel "glacially paced" and noted that the main quest, which "jump-starts a chain of revelations and betrayals that culminate in a second", "ends anticlimactically".
