= Jane Godwin =

Australian writer

- Born: 1964 (age 61–62)
- Occupation: Author
- Known for: Works with Pupils and school pupils[1] and Indigenous children through the Indigenous Literacy Foundation
- Awards: Pixie O’Harris Award

Jane Godwin (born 1964 in Melbourne, Australia) is an Australian author, and is a publisher at Penguin Books Australia for children and young adult books.

She was inducted into the Australian Book Industry Awards Hall of Fame on 9 May 2024; she also won the 2024 Pixie O’Harris Award.

She lives in Melbourne and works with school pupils and Indigenous children through the Indigenous Literacy Foundation.

== Recognition and awards ==
Godwin has sole-authored many books which have been published internationally, and she has earned many commendations.

- 1999: shortlisted for New South Wales State Literary Award Patricia Wrightson Prize - Sebby, Stee, The Garbos and Me
- 1999: finalist Young Australian Best Book Award - Sebby, Stee, The Garbos and Me
- 2000: winner of the Queensland Premier's Literary Award - The Family Tree
- 2006: shortlisted for CBC Book of the Year Awards in the Younger Readers category - The True Story of Mary
- 2021: shortlisted for the Children's prize at the Indie Book Awards - Sing Me The Summer
- 2021: shortlisted for CBCA Children's Book of the Year Award: Older Readers - When Rain Turns to Snow
- 2024: winner of Australian Book Industry Awards (ABIA) - Children's Picture Book of the Year (ages 0–6) - A Life Song
- 2025: shortlisted for the Colin Roderick Award

She lives in Melbourne with her husband and has two children, including Wil Wagner.

== Books ==
- The Family Tree (1998)
- Poor Fish (2000)
- When Anna Slept Over (2001)
- Millie Starts School (2001)
- Jessie and Mr Smith (2003)
- The Day I Turned Ten (2004)
- Minnie and The Super Guys (2004)
- The True Story of Mary (2005)
- When Elephants Lived In The Sea (2006)
- Falling from Grace (2006)
- Little Cat and the Big Red Bus (2008)
- Sam Sullivan's Scooter (2009)
- Where's Sunday? (2010)
- ’All Through the Year (2010)
- Today We Have No Plans (2012)
- Starting School (2013)
- Animal Tales (2014) (contributor)
- How Big is Too Small? (2016)
- Go Go and the Silver Shoes (2018)
- What Do You Wish For? (2018)
- As Happy as Here (2019)
- Poor Fish (2019)
- Sing Me The Summer (2020)
- When Rain Turns to Snow (2020)
- Don’t Forget (2021)
- Arno and His Horse (2021)
- All the Words I Need to Know (2022)
- A Life Song (2023)
- Look Me in the Eye (2024)
