= Pilot & Huxley =

Australian comic book series by Dan McGuiness

Pilot and Huxley (stylized as Pilot & Huxley) is a comic book series that is edited and created by Dan McGuiness. It is published by the Graphix division of the Scholastic Corporation.

== Plot ==
Huxley is in his house when Pilot calls him and tells him to go to his house. When he arrives, Pilot says that his wardrobe has a door to a magical land (which is a hole in the wardrobe that leads to his parents' room.) Then, Huxley had found a note that said: To Huxley, I hate you. I never want to see you again. From P. Which was actually a note from Pilot saying that Huxley deleted Pilot's saved game file in Alien vs Terminator vs Predator vs Robocop vs Jim Carrey, a rented game from Awesome Video. Meanwhile, in Awesome Video, the Vorcons (a type of alien) plan to take over the earth with "The weapon of doom" but the weapon's password to activate it had been transferred to the rented game that Pilot and Huxley have. Back in Pilot's house, a flash of Pilot's future had been shown, saying: I think it's broken, like the leader said. After the flash, the Grim Reaper had arrived in his machine, the Death-Bot 200 had appeared, and he was going to get the game. The Grim Reaper had zapped them to another dimension, a "nauseating mélange of snot, boogers and more snot", where they meet Brett.

== Reception ==
In Wired's Geekdad column, Jonathan H. Liu wrote that he found the comic "weird" and "very bizarre", citing its alien video game rental store and its debt-collecting Grim Reaper, but added that his daughter enjoyed it. Renee Hand wrote in the New York Journal of Books that the comic is a combination of Beavis & Butthead and South Park and warned that some parents might find it inappropriate for their children, though others may enjoy its uniqueness. Kirkus Reviews called the second volume derivative, saying, "The book is full of inspired nonsense. It's just too easy to see who inspired it." In her review at CBGxtra.com, Whitney Grace praised McGuiness's childlike ability to "generate random thoughts and turn them into stories that do not make logical sense."
