= Dragon Moon =

Book by Carole Wilkinson

- Book cover
- Author: Carole Wilkinson
- Cover artist: Rob Davies
- Language: English
- Series: Dragonkeeper
- Genre: Children's fantasy novel
- Publisher: Black Dog Books
- Publication date: April 2007
- Publication place: Australia
- Media type: Print (hardback)
- Pages: 352 pp (first edition, paperback)
- Award: COOL Award – Fiction for Years 7–9 (2008)
- ISBN: 0-330-44111-6
- OCLC: 73954463
- Preceded by: Garden of the Purple Dragon
- Followed by: Blood Brothers

Dragon Moon is a children's fantasy novel by Carole Wilkinson, first published in 2007.

It is the third book of the Dragonkeeper series. The books before it are Dragonkeeper and Garden of the Purple Dragon. It is followed by Blood Brothers, Shadow Sisters and Bronze Bird Tower. The trilogy, based in ancient China, during the Han dynasty, has won many awards. Dragon Moon continues the story of the Dragonkeeper Ping, as she tries to fulfill her first dragon's wishes to care for his son, Kai, and take him to the Dragon Haven, where he can be raised by his kind.

== Plot ==
When the story starts, Liu Che (Ping's former friend and the emperor of China), has his troops attack the Duke of Yan's palace where Ping has been living for a year because he believes that they kidnapped his former imperial dragon Kai. Meanwhile, Ping decides to wake Kai up from his winter hibernation for his safety, and finds that he has not only grown greatly in size, but knowledge as well.

Ping leaves the palace with Kai to search for the Dragon Haven to further ensure his safety. On the way, they find the emperor, Liu Che, wounded with a shard of Kai's dragon stone in his hand. He repents his crimes and decides to abandon his quest for immortality.

In the morning, Ping refuses his offer of love and continues on her journey. As they near the Great Wall of China, they are held hostage by imperial soldiers, who ignore her claim of being the Dragonkeeper. Kai and her are then rescued by barbarians, who also give them a horse. On the way, she meets Jun, and together they find an old man, "Lao Long Zi", one of Danzi's former dragon keepers, at Tinkling Village. He brings them most of the way to Long Gao Yuan before dying.

After getting there, however, Ping discovers only a heap of dragon bones from a massacre by dragon hunters. Ping and Kai are discouraged, and Kai refuses to leave. One day, a yellow dragon swoops down from the sky and carries Kai away. Ping stumbles towards the mountain in a half-dead state, until she too is picked up by the dragon. The dragon spits in her face to obscure her vision to see the location of the Dragon Haven, and brings them to the real, current dragon haven.

There, she learns that many years ago, Hei Lei's dragon keeper had abandoned him for a woman and that his girlfriend, in her old age, had then betrayed the location of the dragon haven to a band of dragon hunters for three pieces of gold. They had killed many of the dragons in hibernation. Only Hei Lei, the black dragon, was awake and attacked the hunters just in time. Still, they managed to get away with many dead dragons in their hands, with only a handful escaping. Ping is distraught as she watches Kai pick up many of the wild dragons' habits and feels him slowly drawing away from her.

During a moon gathering, Kai and Hei Lei end up in a fight, and Kai, who wins, is revealed to be a "dragon of five colors" (green, yellow, black, white, and red). A "dragon of five colors" will automatically assume the position of leader (and no one can challenge them, as the dragons formerly had none). Ping eventually wins the trust and friendship of all the dragons, but realizes that she does not belong with the other dragons, and decides to leave, despite Kai's wish for her to stay till spring. She is taken away from the Haven, and dropped in an empty grassland, where she is rescued by Hei Lei, who she manages to convince to go back to the Dragon Haven. The book ends with Ping beginning a new life with Jun, as she saw in one of her visions of her future.

== Sequel ==
Carole Wilkinson wrote a short prequel called Dragon Dawn. Based on Danzi's past, it does not mention Ping or any recent characters in it except for a few minors. A sequel to Dragon Moon, titled Blood Brothers, was released in 2012.
