= Jen Storer =

Australian children's author (born 1961)

- Born: 25 April 1961 (age 65); Horsham, Victoria, Australia
- Occupation: Writer
- Writing career
- Genre: Children's fiction
- Website: www.jenstorer.com

Jen Storer (born 25 April 1961) is an Australian children's author. Many of her works have been short-listed for major Australian awards such as, the Prime Minister's Literary Awards, the Children's Book Council of Australia Book of the Year and the Aurealis Awards. Her works feature strong female characters, humour, adventure and, occasionally, elements of horror.

== Biography ==
The youngest of four children, Storer was born in Horsham, Victoria.

Storer graduated from Monash University with a Bachelor of Arts (Honors) degree in 2000. After graduating she worked as an editor and in creative development for a publishing house in Melbourne. Storer then went on to write children's fiction. Her first title I Hate Sport was published by Penguin Australia in 2004 as part of their Aussie Chomps series.

Storer lives and works as a writer in Melbourne from a studio at the Abbotsford Convent.

== Books ==
- Wibble Wobble (2019) Illustrated by Lisa Stewart
- Truly Tan: Baffled! (2017) Illustrated by Claire Robertson
- Danny Best: Me First! (2017) Illustrated by Mitch Vane
- Truly Tan: Trapped! (2017) Illustrated by Claire Robertson
- Blue, the Builder's Dog (2016) Illustrated by Andrew Joyner
- Clarrie's Pig Day Out (2016) Illustrated by Sue deGennaro
- Danny Best: Never Wrong (2016) Illustrated by Mitch Vane
- Truly Tan: Hoodwinked! (2016) Illustrated by Claire Robertson
- The Fourteenth Summer of Angus Jack (2015) Illustrated by Lucinda Gifford
- Danny Best: Full On (2015) illustrated by Mitch Vane
- Truly Tan: Freaked! (2014) Illustrated by Claire Robertson
- Romy Bright: Crystal Bay Girls (Book 2) (2014)
- Quincy Jordan: Crystal Bay Girls (Book 1) (2014)
- Truly Tan: Spooked! (2013)
- Truly Tan: Jinxed! (2012)
- Truly Tan (2012)
- The Accidental Princess (2011)
- Norman Does Nothing: Aussie Bites (2011)
- Haggis McGregor and the Night of the Skull Moon : Aussie Bites (2010)
- Tensy Farlow and the Home for Mislaid Children (2009)
- Tan Callahan's Secret Spy Files: The Mystery of Purple Haunt (2008)
- Sing, Pepi, Sing! : Aussie Bites (2006)
- I Hate Sport: Aussie Chomps (2004) – this title written under the pseudonym Prue Storer

== Nominations and awards ==
Australian Publishers Association Book Design Awards

- Short-listed in 2010 for Tensy Farlow and the Home for Mislaid Children (Best Children's Cover)
- Winner 2010 for Tensy Farlow and the Home for Mislaid Children (Best Design Children's Fiction))

Aurealis Award

- Short-listed in 2011 for Haggis McGregor and the Night of the Skull Moon (Children's Fiction – told primarily through words)
- Short-listed in 2009 for Tensy Farlow and the Home for Mislaid Children (Children's Novel)

CBCA Book of the Year

- Notable Book 2014 for Truly Tan: Jinxed! (Younger Readers)
- Notable Book 2012 for The Accidental Princess (Younger Readers)
- Notable Book 2012 for Norman Does Nothing (Younger Readers)
- Notable Book 2010 for Tensy Farlow and the Home for Mislaid Children (Younger Readers)
- Short-listed in 2010 for Tensy Farlow and the Home for Mislaid Children (Younger Readers)

Prime Minister's Literary Award

- Highly Commended in 2012 for The Accidental Princess (Children's Fiction)
- Short-listed in 2010 for Tensy Farlow and the Home for Mislaid Children (Children's Fiction)

Davitt Award

- Winner in 2014 for Truly Tan: Spooked! (Best Children’s Novel)
- Short-listed in 2014 for Truly Tan: Jinxed! (Best Children’s Novel)

W.A. Young Readers Book Award (WAYRBA)

- Short-listed in 2010 for Tensy Farlow and the Home for Mislaid Children (Younger Readers)
