= Odo Hirsch =

Australian writer

- Born: David Kausman; 1962 (age 63–64); Melbourne, Victoria, Australia
- Education: Master's degree in Political Thought, Cambridge University
- Occupations: Author; Doctor
- Writing career
- Notable works: Bartlett series, Darius Bell series, Hazel Green series
- Notable awards: Blue Peter Book Award for Bartlett and the Ice Voyage

Odo Hirsch (born 1962) is the pen name of David Kausman, an Australian author of children's books. He was born in Melbourne, where he trained to be a doctor, but moved to London, where he currently lives.

After working as a doctor in both Melbourne and London, he joined Amnesty International, where he reported on torture victims and examined hospital conditions in Eastern Europe. After doing a master's degree in political thought at Cambridge University, he joined McKinsey & Company in 1997. This was when his first novel for children, Antonio S and the Mystery of Theodore Guzman, was published. His other books include Bartlett and the Ice Voyage, which won the Blue Peter Book Award. His novels have been shortlisted many times for the Children's Book Council of Australia Awards.

== Books ==
=== Bartlett series ===
- Bartlett and the Ice Voyage (1998)
- Bartlett and the City of Flames
- Bartlett and the Forest Of Plenty
- Bartlett and the Island of Kings (2003)

=== Darius Bell series ===
- Darius Bell and the Glitter Pool (2009)
- Darius Bell and the Crystal Bees (2012)

The bees of Darius' town are mysteriously disappearing, and it's up to Darius and his friends to figure out what's causing them to disappear.

=== Frankel Mouse series ===
- Frankel Mouse (2000)
- Frankel Mouse and the Bestish Lair (2002)

=== Hazel Green series ===
- Hazel Green (1999)
- Something's Fishy, Hazel Green! (2000)
- Have Courage, Hazel Green! (2001)
- Think Smart, Hazel Green! (2003)

=== Will Buster series ===
- Will Buster and the Gelmet Helmet (2004)
- Will Buster and the Carrier's Flash (2006)
- Will Buster and the Crucible Choice (2007)

=== Other books ===
- Antonio S. and the Mystery of Theodore Guzman (1997), also published as Antonio S. and the Mysterious Theodore Guzman, and as Antonio S. and the Secret Room
- Yoss (2001)
- Pincus Corbett's strange adventure (2002)
- Slaughterboy (2005)
- The Book of Changing Things (and other oddibosities) (2005)
- Amelia Dee and the Peacock Lamp (2007)
