= Stephen M. Giles =

Australian writer

- Occupation: Children's book author

Stephen M. Giles is a children's book author, best known for the gothic series, Silas and the Winterbottoms and the Anyone But Ivy Pocket series, written under the pseudonym, Caleb Krisp. As of 2010, he is 38 and lives in Sydney. He formerly worked as a film classifier and a market researcher. Giles' biography states that he lives in a shambolic apartment not far from the beach and spends most days wandering around his imagination – which is where he met the Winterbottoms.

His first novel for adults, The Boy at the Keyhole, will be published in September 2018 by Penguin in Australia and Hanover Square Press. The film rights have been sold to New Regency prior to publication.

== Silas and the Winterbottoms ==
The rights to the Silas and the Winterbottoms series have been sold for the United States, Australia, New Zealand, Israel, Germany and Italy.

Silas and the Winterbottoms was described as "a gothic tale of intrigue, adventure and humour, complete with evil relatives, orphans, crocodiles, secret schemes and great escapes. Young fans of series such as Lemony Snicket will enjoy this one, the first in a series."

== Books ==
- Silas and the Winterbottoms (2009) Published in Australia by Pan Macmillan, ISBN 9781741984873; published in the US as The Body Thief.
- The Vulture of Sommerset (2010) Published in Australia by Pan Macmillan, ISBN 9781742620817
- The Death (and Further Adventures) of Silas Winterbottom: The Body Thief (2010) Published in the United States by Sourcebooks Jabberwocky.

=== For adults ===
- The Boy at the Keyhole (2018) Published in Australia by Michael Joseph, ISBN 9780143790631

=== As Caleb Krisp ===
- Anyone But Ivy Pocket, Greenwillow Books, 2015, ISBN 978-0062364340
- Somebody Stop Ivy Pocket, Greenwillow Books, 2016, ISBN 978-0062364371
- Bring Me the Head of Ivy Pocket, Greenwillow Books, 2017, ISBN 978-0062364401
