= Dragonkeeper =

Book by Carole Wilkinson

- Author: Carole Wilkinson
- Cover artist: Blue Boat Design
- Language: English
- Series: Dragonkeeper
- Genre: Folktale and adventure novel
- Publisher: Black Dog Books
- Publication date: 2003
- Publication place: Australia
- Media type: Paperback
- Pages: 339 pp
- ISBN: 978-1-876372-89-7
- OCLC: 156762942
- Followed by: Garden of the Purple Dragon

Dragonkeeper is a fantasy novel written by Australian author Carole Wilkinson. It is the first book of the Dragonkeeper series, which consists of six books (two trilogies) and a prequel. The second book is called Garden of the Purple Dragon and the third book is Dragon Moon. The second trilogy of the series consists of the titles Blood Brothers, Shadow Sister and Bronze Bird Tower. There is also a prequel to the original Dragonkeeper novel known as Dragon Dawn.

The novel is set in ancient China. Ping, a slave girl who works for the evil master Lan, saves the life of an aging dragon and escapes her brutal master. Pursued by a ruthless dragon hunter, the girl and the dragon make an epic journey across China carrying a mysterious stone that must be protected.

== Plot introduction ==
In the far western mountains of the Han Empire in ancient China, a young slave girl is used, abused and neglected by the cruel Master Lan, whose job is to care for the two aged imperial dragons, Long Danzi and Lu Yu. Nameless and alone, the slave girl is without hope and her only friend is her pet rat, Hua. After Lu Yu suddenly dies, the slave girl feels guilty and responsible.

When the girl discovers that the Emperor intends to sell the one remaining dragon, Danzi, to a dragon hunter to be butchered, she and the dragon escape from Huangling together. Long Danzi tells the girl her true name, Ping, and asks her to accompany him to the ocean. She must protect a mysterious stone that is vital to the dragon's legacy. Along the way, they meet Wang Cao, a herbalist previously acquainted with Danzi. The dragon hunter, Diao, catches up with them in a rural village, and though they manage to escape, Diao seizes the stone.

Danzi and Ping travel via the Yellow River to Wucheng, a town of sorcerers, to recover the stone. They find the stone in the possession of a necromancer and reacquire it. Danzi teaches Ping how to use qi (psychic energy) and explains to Ping that she is the hereditary Dragon Keeper. Before she can respond, however, their boat collides with an imperial yacht, and Ping and Danzi are taken into custody at the Emperor's hunting lodge. The Emperor, Liu Che, befriends Ping. Liu Che invites a group of lore masters to the lodge. Wang Cao is one of them. He drugs Ping, convinces Danzi that he is the true Dragon Keeper, and escapes with him and the dragon stone.

Seeing Ping heartbroken, Liu Che invites her to climb Tai Shang Mountain with him. At the peak, Ping realizes that Wang Cao and Danzi are also on Tai Shang, with Diao attacking them. Diao kills Wang Cao, but Ping and Hua arrive. Ping uses qi to defeat Diao, though Hua is mortally wounded. Danzi reconciles with Ping, and the two fly the final leg of their journey to the coast. Ping, however, drops the dragon stone while in flight, and it cracks on impact with the ground. It releases a baby dragon, and Ping realizes that the dragon stone was Lu Yu's last egg. Leaving his son in Ping's care, Danzi bids Ping farewell and flies across the ocean to the Isle Of The Blest, where he and Hua can be healed.

== Film adaptation ==
An animated film adaptation of the book was released in 2024. It is a Spain-Chinese production with the animation by China Film Animation, Dragoia Media, Movistar Plus+, Atresmedia Cine, Ilion Animation Studios and Guardián de Dragones. The film is directed by Salvador Simó and Li Jianping, with the screenplay written by Ignacio Ferreras, Carole Wilkinson, Rosanna Checcini and Pablo Castrillo.

== Awards ==
- 2003 Best Young Adult Book Aurealis Award - winner
- 2004 Children's Book Council of Australia Book of the Year (Younger Readers) - winner
- 2004 Queensland Premier's Literary Best Children's Book Award - winner
- 2004 New South Wales Premier's Literary Awards - shortlist
- 2006 Kids Own Australian Literary Awards (KOALA) Older Readers - winner
- 2006 Kalbacher Klapperschlange Award (Germany) - winner
- 2006 Canberra's Own Outstanding List (COOL) Award - shortlist
