= Kim Gamble =

Australian illustrator (1952–2016)

- Born: 13 July 1952; Sydney, Australia
- Died: 19 February 2016 (aged 63)
- Occupations: Illustrator; teacher
- Years active: 1991–2016
- Children: 2

Kim Gamble (13 July 1952 – 19 February 2016) was an Australian illustrator of children's books. He is best known for the Tashi books, which have been translated into more than 20 languages and adapted for television.

== Early life ==
Kim Hunter Gamble was born in Sydney on 13 July 1952. Whilst initially working as a teacher and in other jobs, he eventually became a children's illustrator later in life.

== Career ==
Gamble trained as a teacher and worked in a variety of occupations.

Gamble was a self-taught artist. Beginning to illustrate stories for children at the age of 24, his first assignment in 1976 was for The Land Behind the World by Anne Spencer Parry and three sequels. In 1989, he illustrated for the School Magazine, and he continued illustrating for the magazine for many years. Gamble met author Anna Fienberg, with whom he produced more than 20 books, at the School Magazine where she was the editor.

He illustrated The Magnificent Nose and Other Marvels by Anna Fienberg, published in 1991. His collaborations with Fienberg included award winning The Magnificent Nose and Other Marvels, the Tashi series and Tashi picture books, the Minton series and Joseph. Joseph was shortlisted for the 2002 CBCA Picture Book of the Year Award. The Tashi series of books were translated into more than 20 languages and adapted for television.

He worked with many authors and illustrated over seventy books in his career. Some of Gamble's artwork for The Hottest Boy Who Ever Lived by Anna Fienberg is held in the National Centre for Australian Children's Literature (formerly the Lu Rees Archives).

== Works ==
- Parry, Anne Spencer, 1931–1985; Gamble Kim, 1952–2016, (illustrator.) (1976), The Land Behind the World, Pinchgut Press, ISBN 0-9598913-2-3
- Parry, Anne Spencer, 1931–1985; Gamble Kim, 1952–2016, (illustrator.) (1977), The Lost Souls of the Twilight, Pinchgut Press, ISBN 0-9598913-4-X
- Parry, Anne Spencer, 1931–1985; Gamble Kim, 1952–2016, (illustrator.) (1979), The Crown of Darkness, Pinchgut Press, ISBN 0-9598913-6-6
- Parry, Anne Spencer, 1931–1985; Gamble Kim, 1952–2016, (illustrator.) (1980), The Crown of Light, Pinchgut Press, ISBN 0-9598913-7-4
- Fienberg, Anna; Gamble, Kim, 1952–2016, (illustrator.) (1991), The magnificent nose and other stories, Allen & Unwin, ISBN 978-1-86448-666-7 (the Children's Book of the Year Award: Younger Readers in 1992)
- Fienberg, Anna; Gamble, Kim, 1952–2016 (1992), Ariel, Zed and the secret of life, Little Ark Book, ISBN 978-1-86373-277-2
- Fienberg, Anna; Gamble, Kim, 1952–2016, (illustrator.) (1993), The hottest boy who ever lived, St Leonards, NSW Allen & Unwin, ISBN 978-1-86373-477-6
- Gamble, Kim (1994), You can draw anything, St. Leonards, NSW Allen & Unwin, ISBN 978-1-86373-680-0
- Rodell, Susanna; Gamble, Kim, 1952–2016 (1994), Dear Fred, Viking, ISBN 978-0-670-85493-6
- Freeman, Pamela; Gamble, Kim, 1952–2016, (illustrator.) (1996), Victor's quest, Norwood, South Australia Omnibus Books, ISBN 978-1-86291-286-1
- Fraser, Janine M; Gamble, Kim, 1952–2016 (1996), Abdullah's butterfly, Angus & Robertson; London : HarperCollins, ISBN 978-0-207-19080-3
- Gamble, Kim (1997), Amazing faces, Dorling Kindersley, ISBN 978-0-7513-5564-2
- Wild, Margaret; Gamble, Kim, 1952–2016, (illustrator.) (1998), First day, St. Leonards, N.S.W. Allen & Unwin, ISBN 978-1-86448-103-7
- Orr, Wendy; Gamble, Kim, 1952–2016, (illustrator.) (1998), Arabella, Pymble, N.S.W. HarperCollins, ISBN 978-0-207-19904-2
- Lee, Lyn; Gamble, Kim, (illustrator.) (2000), Pog, Omnibus Books, ISBN 978-1-86291-412-4
- Fienberg, Anna; Gamble, Kim, 1952–2016 (2001), Joseph, Allen & Unwin, ISBN 978-1-86448-170-9
- Fraser, Janine M; Gamble, Kim, 1952–2016, (illustrator.) (2001), Sarindi and the lucky bird (Repr. ed.), Pymble, Sydney, NSW Angus & Robertson, ISBN 978-0-207-19914-1
- McKinnon, Ferg; Gamble, Kim, 1952–2016 (2002), A bee in Ben's bonnet, Random House Australia, ISBN 978-1-74051-721-8
- Fienberg, Anna; Gamble, Kim, (illustrator.) (2002), Horrendo's curse, Crows Nest, N.S.W. Allen & Unwin, ISBN 978-1-86508-603-3
- Lee, Lyn; Gamble, Kim, 1952–2016 (2004), Mary, the big brown hairy spider, Omnibus Books, ISBN 978-1-86291-533-6
- Lee, Lyn; Gamble, Kim, 1952–2016 (2006), Eight (Pbk. ed.), Omnibus Books, ISBN 978-1-86291-519-0
- Freeman, Pamela; Gamble, Kim, 1952–2016 (2009), Victor's challenge (1st ed.), Newtown, NSW Walker Books Australia Pty Ltd, ISBN 978-1-921150-32-6
- Whittle, Cate; Gamble, Kim, 1952–2016, (illustrator.) (2016), Trouble at home, Parkside SA Omnibus Books, ISBN 978-1-74299-076-7

=== Tashi books ===
- Fienberg, Anna; Gamble, Kim, 1952–2016; Fienberg, Barbara (1995), Tashi, St Leonards, NSW Allen & Unwin, ISBN 978-1-86373-806-4
- Fienberg, Anna; Fienberg, Barbara, (author.); Gamble, Kim, 1952–2016, (illustrator.) (1995), Tashi and the giants, St. Leonards, NSW Allen & Unwin, ISBN 978-1-86373-945-0
- Fienberg, Anna; Gamble, Kim, 1952–2016; Fienberg, Barbara (1996), Tashi and the ghosts, Allen & Unwin, ISBN 978-1-86448-090-0
- Fienberg, Anna; Fienberg, Barbara, (author.); Gamble, Kim, 1952–2016, (illustrator.) (1997), Tashi and the genie, St. Leonards, NSW Allen & Unwin, ISBN 978-1-86448-296-6
- Fienberg, Anna; Fienberg, Barbara, (author.); Gamble, Kim, 1952–2016, (illustrator.) (1998), Tashi and the Baba Yaga, St. Leonards, NSW Allen & Unwin, ISBN 978-1-86448-688-9
- Fienberg, Anna; Gamble, Kim, 1952–2016; Fienberg, Barbara (1999), Tashi and the demons, Allen & Unwin, ISBN 978-1-86508-084-0
- Fienberg, Anna; Fienberg, Barbara, (author.); Gamble, Kim, 1952–2016, (illustrator.) (2000), Tashi and the big stinker, St Leonards, NSW Allen & Unwin, ISBN 978-1-86508-350-6 ;
- Fienberg, Anna; Gamble, Kim, 1952–2016; Fienberg, Barbara (2001), Tashi and the dancing shoes, Allen & Unwin, ISBN 978-1-86508-552-4
- Fienberg, Anna; Gamble, Kim, 1952–2016; Fienberg, Barbara (2002), Tashi and the haunted house, Allen & Unwin; Andover : Ragged Bears, ISBN 978-1-86508-840-2
- Fienberg, Anna; Gamble, Kim, 1952–2016; Fienberg, Barbara (2003), Tashi and the royal tomb, Allen & Unwin, ISBN 978-1-74114-090-3
- Fienberg, Anna; Gamble, Kim, 1952–2016, (illustratior.); Fienberg, Barbara, (author.) (May 2008), There once was a boy called Tashi, Crows Nest, N.S.W. Allen & Unwin, ISBN 978-1-74114-719-3 ;
- Fienberg, Anna; Fienberg, Barbara; Gamble, Kim, 1952–2016, (ill.) (2004), Tashi lost in the city, Allen & Unwin, ISBN 978-1-74114-401-7
- Fienberg, Anna; Gamble, Kim, 1952–2016; Fienberg, Barbara (2005), Tashi and the forbidden room, Allen & Unwin, ISBN 978-1-74114-731-5
- Fienberg, Anna; Fienberg, Barbara, (author.); Gamble, Kim, 1952–2016, (illustrator.) (April 2007), Tashi and the stolen bus, Crows Nest, N.S.W. Allen & Unwin, ISBN 978-1-74114-877-0 ;
- Fienberg, Anna; Fienberg, Barbara; Gamble, Kim, 1952–2016 (2007), Tashi and the mixed-up monster, Allen & Unwin, ISBN 978-1-74175-191-8
- Fienberg, Anna; Fienberg, Barbara; Gamble, Kim, 1952–2016 (June 2009), Tashi and the phoenix, Allen and Unwin, ISBN 978-1-74175-474-2
- Fienberg, Anna; Fienberg, Barbara, (author.); Gamble, Kim, (illustrator.) (March 2010), Tashi and the golem, East Melbourne, Victoria Allen and Unwin, ISBN 978-1-74175-792-7 ;
- Fienberg, Anna; Fienberg, Barbara, (author.); Gamble, Kim, (illustrator.) (May 2014), Once Tashi met a dragon, Sydney Allen & Unwin, ISBN 978-1-74175-887-0 ;
- Fienberg, Anna; Fienberg, Barbara, (author.); Kelly, Geoff, 1957–, (illustrator.); Gamble, Kim, 1952–2016, (illustrator.) (November 2014), Tashi and the wicked magician and other stories, Crows Nest, N.S.W. Allen & Unwin, ISBN 978-1-74331-508-8 ;

=== Minton books ===
- Fienberg, Anna; Gamble, Kim, 1952–2016 (1999), Minton goes driving, Allen & Unwin, ISBN 978-1-86448-594-3
- Fienberg, Anna; Gamble, Kim, (illustrator.); Fienberg, Anna, (author.) Contains (work) Minton goes! underwater; Fienberg, Anna, (author.) Contains (work) Minton goes! home at last (2008), Minton goes! underwater & home at last, Crows Nest, NSW Allen & Unwin, ISBN 978-1-74175-429-2
- Fienberg, Anna; Gamble, Kim (2008), Minton goes! : sailing & flying, Allen & Unwin, ISBN 978-1-74175-428-5
- Fienberg, Anna; Gamble, Kim, 1952–2016; Fienberg, Anna. Minton goes driving; Fienberg, Anna. Minton goes trucking (2008), Minton goes driving & trucking, Allen & Unwin, ISBN 978-1-74175-427-8
- Fienberg, Anna; Gamble, Kim, 1952–2016, (illustrator.) (January 2015), Minton goes!, Crows Nest, NSW Allen & Unwin, ISBN 978-1-76011-196-0

== Awards ==
- 1992 Crichton Award for Children's Book Illustration for The magnificent nose and other stories, Allen & Unwin, 1991, ISBN 978-1-86448-666-7

== Personal life ==
Gamble had two daughters, Greer (biol.) and Arielle. He died on 19 February 2016 at the age of 63.
