= Simon Higgins =

Australian screenwriter

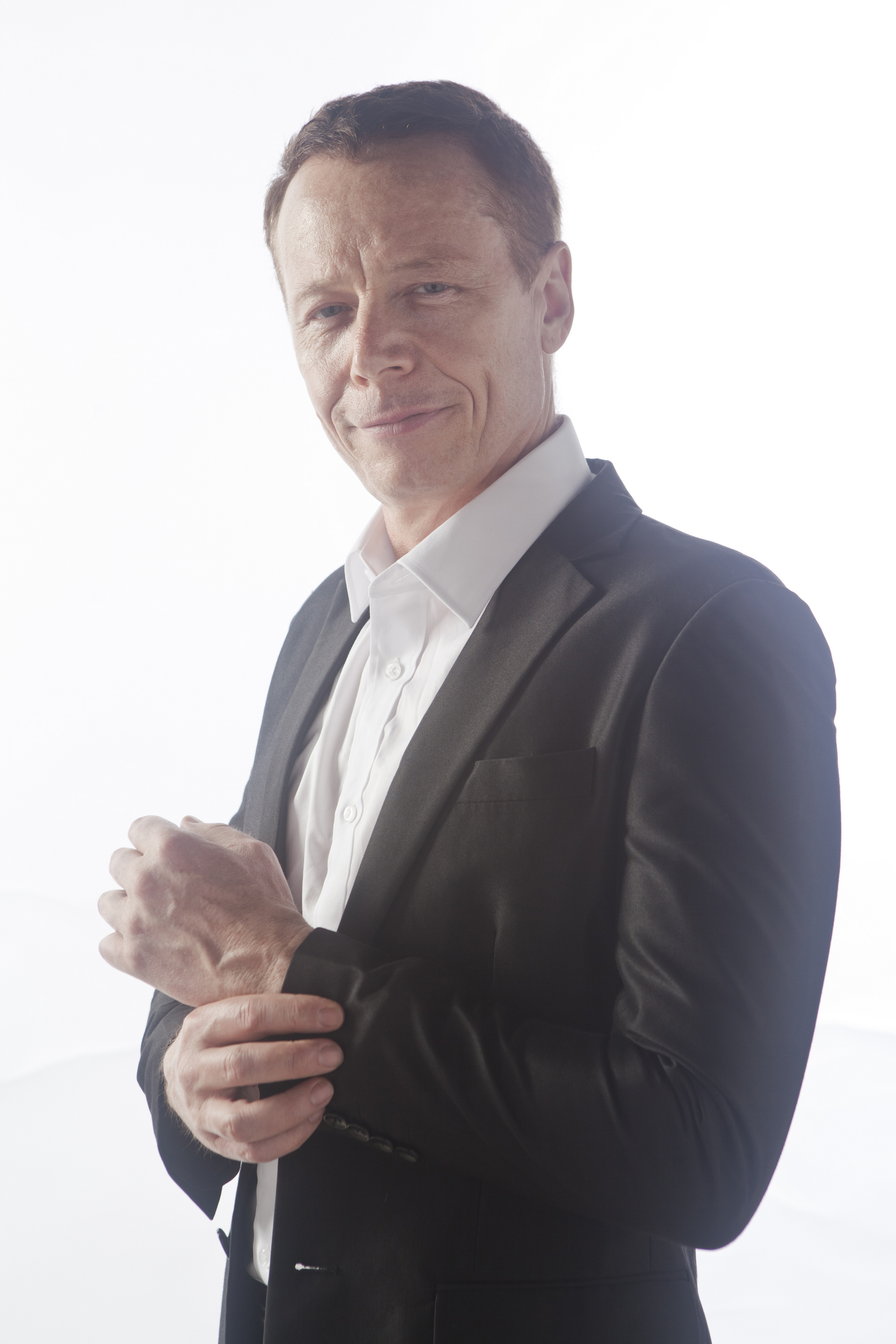
- Born: Aldershot, England
- Occupations: Novelist, screenwriter
- Writing career
- Notable works: Tomodachi: The Edge of the World, Moonshadow series, Gemini Fables TV series
- Website: simonhiggins.net

Simon Higgins is an Australian screenwriter and author of books for young adults, born in 1958 in England. He arrived in Australia in 1963 after first living in Nigeria.

== Career ==
Originally a police officer then private investigator in Adelaide, South Australia, working predominantly on homicide cases, Higgins turned to writing in 1998.

He has published 12 novels, often combining the crime, speculative fiction and historical adventure genres. His works have been divided between Random House, the Hachette Group and Pulp Fiction Press. His short stories have also been published by Pan Macmillan/Ford Street Publishing.

His debut novel, Doctor Id, was published in Australia in 1998, and subsequently released in Italy and serialised in Japan. It was listed as a 1999 Notable Book of the Year by the Children's Book Council of Australia.

Higgins' second novel, Thunderfish, was also listed as a 2000 Notable Book by the CBCA.

One of the sequels to Thunderfish, titled Under No Flag, was shortlisted for a Ned Kelly Crime Writing Award in 2002.

In 2007, Higgins won a Fellowship of Australian Writers (FAW) National Literary Award for an unpublished novel about historical Asia.

He trained and competed in Japan in the traditional sword art of Iaido, and placed fifth in Iaido's world titles in Kyoto in 2008 He has stated that this personal immersion in traditional Asian warrior culture and discipline inspired his most successful novels, which featured samurai and ninja.

His 2008 novel, Moonshadow: Eye of the Beast, was an Australian bestseller, was shortlisted for the 2008 Aurealis Fantasy Award and was subsequently published in the United States, Germany, Indonesia and England. Higgins was invited to appear on Australia's highest rating children's TV show, Saturday Disney, to discuss the book and demonstrate swordplay.

He has written short stories for several anthologies, in the horror, science fiction and historical adventure genres. He has also authored numerous articles on the craft of writing and creative brainstorming.

A prolific public speaker and teacher of creative writing, he is known for incorporating martial arts demonstrations into his presentations to middle school, high school and university-level writing students in Australia, England and Asia.

Higgins has been repeatedly noted in teaching journals and the Australian media for his efforts to 'masculinise reading'.

In 2010, in recognition of his efforts to promote greater understanding of Asian cultures, Higgins was invited by the Australian government's Asia Education Foundation to become an ambassador for Asia Literacy.

His novel Moonshadow: Eye of the Beast was made a recommended school curriculum text by the Asia Education Foundation.

In 2013, Higgins received an Australian Government Endeavour Executive Fellowship Award to live and study 'Screenwriting for Film & TV Animation' in China. This led to his ongoing creative collaboration with Crane Animation, based in Guilin, China, first in the role of creative consultant, then as a screenwriter for their award-winning series Gemini Fables, and as coach of the company's in-house writing team.
