= Carole Wilkinson =

Australian writer (born 1950)

- Born: 12 July 1950 (age 76); Derby, England
- Occupation: Writer
- Writing career
- Notable work: Dragonkeeper series
- Notable awards: Children's Book of the Year Award: Younger Readers (2008)
- Website: carolewilkinson.com.au

Carole Wilkinson (born 1950) is an Australian writer, best known for Dragonkeeper (2003).

== Career ==
Wilkinson was born in Derby, England. The family emigrated to Australia when she was 12 in 1963. She worked as a laboratory assistant until the age of 40, when she decided on a change of career.

To help achieve her goal she studied at a tertiary level. During her time at University she showed some of her writing to a friend who worked in the publishing industry. This sample led to a commission to write her first novel for teenagers.

Since that time she has gone on to write numerous books for educational and trade publishers in Australia. She has also written episodes for children's television production.

In 2011 Carole went to St. Ignatius College, Adelaide. Classes Year 5 Red, Yr 5 Gold and Year 5 Blue were reading the books as well.

Wilkinson's daughter Lili Wilkinson also writes for young adults.

== Dragonkeeper ==
Dragonkeeper was published in 2003 by Black Dog Books. Set in Han dynasty China, the story describes the adventures of Ping and an ageing dragon. It has won a number of awards including:

- 2003 Aurealis Award (Young Adults)
- 2004 Children's Book Council of Australia Book of the Year Award (Young Readers)
- 2004 Queensland Premier's Literary Awards (Best Children's Book)
- 2006 Kalbacher Klapperschlange (German Children's Choice Award)

Dragonkeeper was also shortlisted for the New South Wales Premier's Literary Awards (2004) for the Patricia Wrightson Prize for Children's Books. The US version of the book was published in April 2005 and was published in the UK on 30 April of the same year.

The first sequel to Dragonkeeper was published in September 2005, titled Garden of the Purple Dragon. Dragon Moon followed in 2007. There is also a prequel to Dragonkeeper, a book called Dragon Dawn, about Danzi's adventures before he was put in Huangling mountain.

== Published books ==
=== Dragonkeeper series ===
- Dragonkeeper (Black Dog Books, 2003)
- Garden of the Purple Dragon (2005)
- Dragon Moon (2007)
- Dragon Dawn (2008) – prequel
- Blood Brothers (2012)
- Shadow Sister (2014)
- Bronze Bird Tower (2017) – "The final part ...", OCLC 953577197

=== Ramose series ===
- Ramose: Prince in Exile (2003)
- Ramose and the Tomb Robbers (2003)
- Ramose: Sting of the Scorpion (2006)
- Ramose: Wrath of Ra (2006)

=== The Drum series ===
- Black Snake (2002)
- Fire in the Belly (2004)
- Alexander the Great (2004)

=== Nonfiction ===
- Black Snake: The Daring of Ned Kelly (2002)
- Ned Kelly's Jerilderie Letter, ed. Wilkinson (2007)
- The Dragon Companion: An Encyclopedia, illus. Dean Jones (Black Dog Books, 2007), OCLC 180190705
- Fromelles: Australia's Bloodiest Day at War (2011)
- Atmospheric: The Burning Story of Climate Change (2015)
- Matthew Flinders: Adventures on leaky ships (2020)

=== Other books ===
- Stagefright (1996)
- Deepwater (1999)
- Out of Orbit (1999)
- Bertrand's Quest (2000)
- Knight's Progress (2000)
- Watery Graves (2000)
- Careless Wishes (2001)
- Careless Wishes (2001)
- Sugar Sugar (2010)
