= Black Dog Books (Australian publisher) =

Australian publisher

- Parent company: Walker Books (Walker Books Australia)
- Country of origin: Australia
- Headquarters location: Fitzroy, Victoria
- Fiction genres: Children's literature

Black Dog Books was an independent publisher and production house based in Fitzroy, Victoria, Australia. Since 2011 it is an imprint of Walker Books. It focuses on children's literature (as does the Walker Group) but publishes books in all genres.

== History ==
Black Dog Books publishes books in all genres but focuses mainly on children's literature. The company's books are distributed in Australia by Murdoch Books, New Zealand by Scholastic Corporation, and in South Africa by Rynew Educational Enterprises. Black Dog Books is also a production house, producing books for Horwitz Martin and Pearson Education. The company has published multiple award-winning and short-list nominee titles. Their first winning title was in 2002 with When Mum Was Little by Mini Goss which won the Crichton Award for Children's Book Illustration. A notable author that they publish is Carole Wilkinson whose works published by Black Dog Books have won more than five awards, including the Children's Book of the Year Award: Younger Readers and the Aurealis Award for Best Young Adult Novel. Other winning authors include Sue Lawson, Mark Norman, Pamela Freeman, Danny Katz, Ben Beaton, Leon Davidson, and Paula Hunt.

In 2011, the company was acquired by Walker Books and became an imprint.
