= Aurealis Award for Best Young Adult Novel =

Annual Australian award for fiction

Aurealis Award for best young adult novel
- Awarded for: Excellence in young adult speculative fiction novels
- Country: Australia
- Presented by: Chimaera Publications, Continuum Foundation
- Status: Active
- First award: 1995
- Currently held by: Kathryn Barker
- Website: Official site

The Aurealis Awards are presented annually by the Australia-based Chimaera Publications and WASFF to published works to "recognise the achievements of Australian science fiction, fantasy, horror writers". To qualify, a work must have been first published by an Australian citizen or permanent resident between 1 January and 31 December of the corresponding year; the presentation ceremony is held the following year. It has grown from a small function of around 20 people to a two-day event attended by over 200 people.

Since their creation in 1995, awards have been given in various categories of speculative fiction. Categories currently include science fiction, fantasy, horror, speculative young adult fiction—with separate awards for novels and short fiction—collections, anthologies, illustrative works or graphic novels, children's books, and an award for excellence in speculative fiction. The awards have attracted the attention of publishers by setting down a benchmark in science fiction and fantasy. The continued sponsorship by publishers such as HarperCollins and Orbit has added weight to the honour of the award.

The results are decided by a panel of judges from a list of submitted nominees; the long-list of nominees is reduced to a short-list of finalists. Ties can occur if the panel decides that both entries show equal merit, however they are encouraged to choose a single winner. The judges are selected from a public application process by the Award's management team.

This article lists all the short-list nominees and winners in the best young-adult novel category, as well as novels that have been highly commended. Four people have won the award twice – Isobelle Carmody, Garth Nix, Scott Westerfeld, and most recently Kathryn Barker. Nix and Westerfeld hold the record for most nominations with nine, and Rory Barnes has the most nominations without winning, having been a losing finalist five times.

== Winners and nominees ==
In the following table, the years correspond to the year of the book's eligibility; the ceremonies are always held the following year. Each year links to the corresponding "year in literature" article. Entries with a blue background have won the award; those with a white background are the nominees on the short-list.

* Winners and joint winners
* Nominees on the shortlist

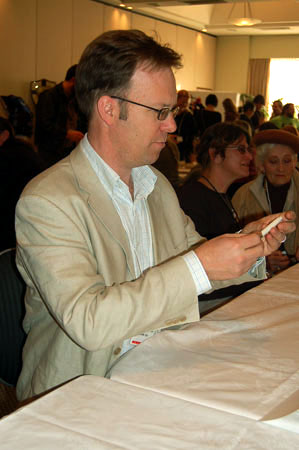
Garth Nix has been a finalist on nine occasions, winning in 1995 and 2003.

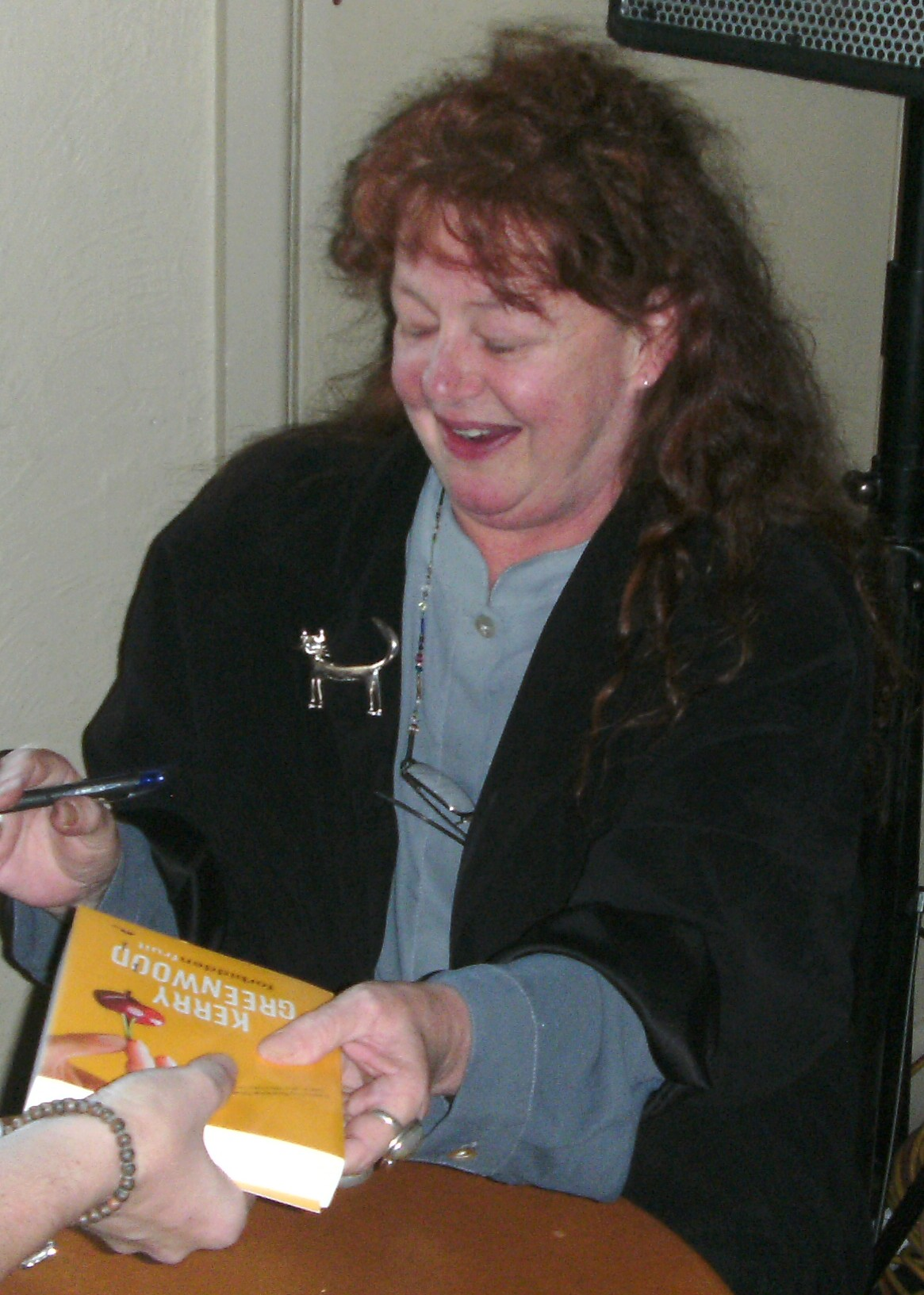
Kerry Greenwood has won once in 1996 and received a high commendation in 2005.

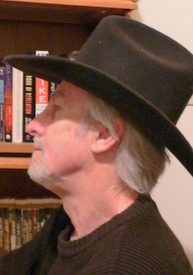
Damien Broderick has been a short-list nominee twice with his collaborations with Rory Barnes.

Richard Harland has been a finalist once in 2000.

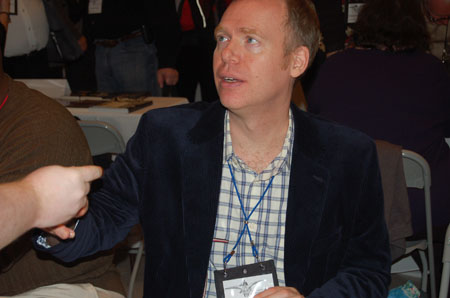
Scott Westerfeld has received the most nominations with nine and has been a winner on two of those occasions.

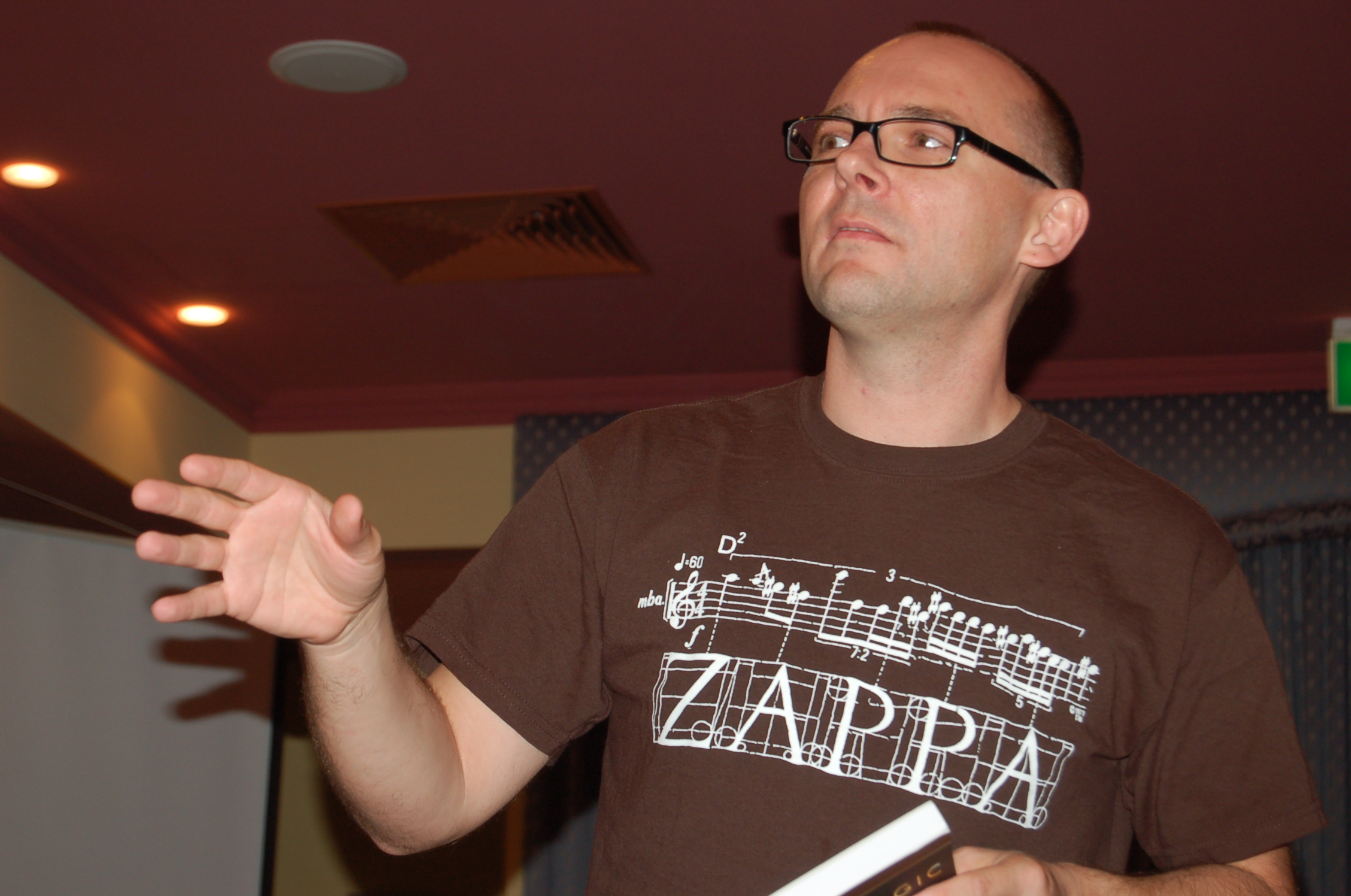
Sean Williams has been a finalist twice, most recently in 2009.

Year	Author(s)	Novel	Publisher	Ref
1995	Brian Caswell*	Deucalion	UQP	
1995	Garth Nix*	Sabriel	Moonstone	
1995	Isobelle Carmody	Ashling	Viking Press	
1995	Catherine Jinks	Witch Bank	Puffin Books	
1995	John Marsden	The Third Day, The Frost	Pan Macmillan	
1996	Hilary Bell*	Mirror, Mirror	Hodder Headline	
1996	Kerry Greenwood*	The Broken Wheel	Moonstone	
1996	Sara Douglass	Beyond the Hanging Wall	Voyager Books	
1996	Victor Kelleher	Firedancer	Penguin Books	
1996	Michael Pryor	The Mask of Caliban	Hodder Headline	
1997	Isobelle Carmody*	Greylands	Puffin Books	
1997	Catherine Jinks*	Eye to Eye	Puffin Books	
1997	Patricia Bernard	The Outcast	Moonstone	
1997	Damien Broderick & Rory Barnes	Zones	Moonstone	
1997	Garth Nix	Shade's Children	Allen & Unwin	
1998	Alison Goodman*	Singing the Dogstar Blues	HarperCollins	
1998	Rory Barnes	Horsehead Boy	HarperCollins	
1998	Melissa Lucashenko	Killing Darcy	UQP	
1998	Dave Luckett	A Dark Winter	Omnibus Books	
1998	John Marsden	The Night Is for Hunting	Pan Macmillan	
1999	Dave Luckett*	A Dark Victory	Omnibus Books	
1999	Rory Barnes	Horsehead Man	HarperCollins	
1999	Damien Broderick & Rory Barnes	Stuck in Fast Forward	HarperCollins	
1999	Victor Kelleher	Into the Dark	Viking Press	
1999	Victor Kelleher	The Ivory Trail	Viking Press	
2000	Sonya Hartnett*	Thursday's Child	Penguin Books	
2000	Rory Barnes	Horsehead Soup	HarperCollins	
2000	Richard Harland	Ferren and the Angel	Penguin Books	
2000	Christine Harris	Omega	Random House	
2000	Sophie Masson	The Green Prince	Hodder Headline	
2001	Louise Katz*	The Other Face of Janus	Angus & Robertson	
2001	Anna Fienberg	The Witch in the Lake	Allen & Unwin	
2001	Garth Nix	Lirael	Allen & Unwin	
2001	Cameron Rogers	The Music of Razors	Penguin Books	
2001	Gillian Rubinstein	Terra-Farma	Viking Press	
2002	Sophie Masson*	The Hand of Glory	Hodder Headline	
2002	Kate Forsyth	The Starthorn Tree	Pan Books	
2002	David McRobbie	Mum, Me, the 19th C	Angus & Robertson	
2002	Natalie Jane Prior	Fireworks and Darkness	Angus & Robertson	
2003	Garth Nix*	Abhorsen	Allen & Unwin	
2003	Carole Wilkinson*	Dragonkeeper	Black Dog Books	
2003	Janeen Webb	The Silken Road to Samarkand	HarperCollins	
2004	Scott Westerfeld*	The Secret Hour	Eos	
2004	Jackie French	Flesh and Blood	HarperCollins	
2004	Penni Russon	Undine	Random House	
2004	Matt Zurbo	Hot Nights, Cool Dragons	Allen & Unwin	
2005	Isobelle Carmody*	Alyzon Whitestarr	Penguin Books	
2005	Anthony Eaton	Nightpeople	UQP	
2005	Justine Larbalestier	Magic or Madness	Penguin Books	
2005	Scott Westerfeld	Peeps	Penguin Books	
2005	Scott Westerfeld	Uglies	Simon & Schuster	
2006	D. M. Cornish*	Foundling	Omnibus Books	
2006	Amanda Holohan	The King's Fool	ABC Books	
2006	Justine Larbalestier	Magic Lessons	Penguin Books	
2006	Juliet Marillier	Wildwood Dancing	Pan Macmillan	
2006	Scott Westerfeld	The Last Days	Penguin Books	
2007	Anthony Eaton*	Skyfall	UQP	
2007	Kate Constable	Taste of Lightning	Allen & Unwin	
2007	Juliet Marillier	Cybele's Secret	Pan Macmillan	
2007	Michael Pryor	Heart of Gold	Random House	
2007	Scott Westerfeld	Extras	Simon Pulse	
2008	Melina Marchetta*	Finnikin of the Rock	Viking Press	
2008	Isobelle Carmody	The Stone Key	Viking Press	
2008	D. M. Cornish	Lamplighter	Omnibus Books	
2008	Alison Goodman	The Two Pearls of Wisdom	HarperCollins	
2008	Sean Williams	The Changeling	Angus & Robertson	
2009	Scott Westerfeld*	Leviathan	Penguin Books	
2009	Kate Forsyth	The Puzzle Ring	Pan Macmillan	
2009	Cassandra Golds	The Museum of Mary Child	Puffin Books	
2009	Glenda Millard	A Small Free Kiss in the Dark	Allen & Unwin	
2009	Sean Williams	The Scarecrow	HarperCollins	
2010	Karen Healey*	Guardian of the Dead	Allen & Unwin	
2010	Ananda Braxton-Smith	Merrow	Black Dog Books	
2010	Sonya Hartnett	The Midnight Zoo	Penguin Books	
2010	Doug MacLeod	The Life of a Teenage Body-Snatcher	Penguin Books	
2010	Scott Westerfeld	Behemoth	Penguin Books	
2011	Penni Russon*	Only Ever Always	Allen & Unwin	
2011	Em Bailey	Shift	Hardie Grant Egmont	
2011	Ananda Braxton-Smith	Secrets of Carrick: Tantony	Black Dog Books	
2011	Karen Healey	The Shattering	Allen & Unwin	
2011	Meg Mundell	Black Glass	Scribe Publications	
2012	Kaz Delaney* (tie)	Dead, Actually	Allen & Unwin	
2012	Margo Lanagan* (tie)	Sea Hearts	Allen & Unwin	
2012	Andrea K. Höst	And All the Stars	Andrea K. Hosth	
2012	Ambelin Kwaymullina	The Interrogation of Ashala Wolf	Walker Books	
2012	Louis Nowra	Into That Forest	Allen & Unwin	
2013	Amie Kaufman & Meagan Spooner* (tie)	These Broken Stars	Allen & Unwin	
2013	Allyse Near* (tie)	Fairytales for Wilde Girls	Random House Australia	
2013	Tony Davies	The Big Dry	HarperCollins	
2013	Andrea K. Höst	Hunting	Andrea K. Hösth	
2013	Claire Zorn	The Sky So Heavy	University of Queensland Press	
2014	Jaclyn Moriarty*	The Cracks in the Kingdom	Pan Macmillan Australia	
2014	Rebecca Lim	The Astrologer's Daughter	Text Publishing	
2014	Lynnette Lounsbury	Afterworld	Allen & Unwin	
2014	Garth Nix	Clariel	Allen & Unwin	
2014	Nova Weetman	The Haunting of Lily Frost	UQP	
2014	Scott Westerfeld	Afterworlds	Penguin Books Australia	
2015	Kathryn Barker*	In the Skin of a Monster	Allen & Unwin	
2015	Alison Goodman	Lady Helen and the Dark Days Club	HarperCollins	
2015	Francesca Haig	The Fire Sermon	HarperVoyager	
2015	Trent Jamieson	Day Boy	Text Publishing	
2015	Amie Kaufman and Jay Kristoff	Illuminae	Allen & Unwin	
2015	Skye Melki-Wagner	Hush	Penguin Random House Australia	
2016	Alison Goodman*	Lady Helen and the Dark Days Pact	HarperCollins Publishers	
2016	Jane Abbott	Elegy	Penguin Random House Australia	
2016	Alison Croggon	The Bone Queen	Penguin Books Australia	
2016	Emily Gale	The Other Side of Summer	Penguin Random House Australia	
2016	Amie Kaufman and Jay Kristoff	Gemima: The Illuminae Files 2	Allen & Unwin	
2016	Garth Nix	Goldenhand	Allen & Unwin	
2017	Cally Black*	In the Dark Spaces	Hardie Grant Egmont	
2017	Alison Evans	Ida	Bonnier Publishing Australia	
2017	Garth Nix	Frogkisser!	Allen & Unwin	
2017	Emily Suvada	This Mortal Coil	Puffin UK	
2017	Marlee Jane Ward	Psynode	Seizure	
2017	Paula Weston	The Undercurrent	Text Publishing	
2018	Ambelin Kwaymullina & Ezekiel Kwaymullina*	Catching Teller Crow	Allen & Unwin	
2018	Sarah Epstein	Small Spaces	Walker Books Australia	
2018	Jay Kristoff	Lifel1k3	Allen & Unwin	
2018	Emily Rodda	His Name Was Walter	HarperCollins Publishers	
2018	Jo Spurier	A Curse of Ash and Ember	HarperCollins Publishers	
2018	Scott Westerfeld	Impostors	Allen & Unwin	
2019	Amie Kaufman & Jay Kristoff*	Aurora Rising	Allen & Unwin	
2019	P. M. Freestone	The Darkest Bloom	Scholastic	
2019	Lisa Fuller	Ghost Bird	University of Queensland Press	
2019	Jay Kristoff	Dev1at3	Allen & Unwin	
2019	Juliet Marillier	The Harp of Kings	Macmillan	
2019	K. S. Nikakis	I Heard the Wolf Call My Name	SOV Media	
2020	Lili Wilkinson*	The Erasure Initiative	Allen & Unwin	
2020	Asphyxia	Future Girl	Allen & Unwin	
2020	Amie Kaufman and Jay Kristoff	Aurora Burning	Allen & Unwin	
2020	Amie Kaufman and Meagan Spooner	The Other Side of the Sky	Allen & Unwin	
2020	Jay Kristoff	Truel1f3	Allen & Unwin	
2020	Garth Nix	The Left-Handed Booksellers of London	Allen & Unwin	
2021	Kathryn Barker*	Waking Romeo	Allen & Unwin	
2021	Amie Kaufman and Jay Kristoff	Aurora's End	Allen & Unwin	
2021	Maree Kimberley	Dirt Circus League	Text	
2021	Cameron Nunn	Echo in the Memory	Walker Books Australia	
2021	Gabrielle Williams	It's Not You, It's Me	Allen & Unwin	
2021	Garth Nix	Terciel & Elinor	Allen & Unwin	
2022	Vanessa Len	Only a Monster	Allen & Unwin	
2022	Sarah Epstein	Night Lights	Fourteen Press	
2022	Nikky Lee	The Rarkyn's Familiar	Parliament House Press	
2022	Ann Liang	If You Could See the Sun	HQ Fiction	
2022	Kate Murray	We Who Hunt the Hollow	Hardie Grant	
2023	Katya de Becerra	When Ghosts Call Us Home	Macmillan	
2023	Graham Akhurst	Borderland	UWA	
2023	Caleb Finn	Archives of Despair	Penguin Random House Australia	
2023	Melanie Kanicky	The Weaver	MidnightSun	
2023	sydney khoo	The Spider and Her Demons	Penguin Random House Australia	
2023	Nathan Taylor	The Non-Magical Declan Moore	Magpie Drive	

Most nominations (as of the 2022 ceremony celebrating 2021 nominees):

- Garth Nix (9)
- Scott Westerfeld (9)
- Jay Kristoff (8)
- Amie Kaufman (7)
- Isobelle Carmody (4)
- Alison Goodman (4)
- Rory Barnes (3)
- Victor Kelleher (3)
- Juliet Marillier (3)

Double wins (as of the 2022 ceremony celebrating 2021 nominees):

- Kathryn Barker (2)
- Isobelle Carmody (2)
- Garth Nix (2)
- Scott Westerfeld (2)

== High commendations ==
The high commendations are announced alongside the list of finalists for their respected year of eligibility. In the following table, the years correspond to the year of the book's eligibility; the ceremonies are always held the following year. Each year links to the corresponding "year in literature" article.

Year	Author	Novel	Publisher	Ref
2005	Kerry Greenwood	The Rat and the Raven	Lothian Books	
2005	Penni Russon	Breathe	Random House	
2005	Scott Westerfeld	Pretties	Simon & Schuster	

== See also ==
- Ditmar Award, an Australian science fiction award established in 1969
