= Girlfriend (magazine) =

Australian teen girls magazine

- Editor: Bree Player
- Categories: Teen magazine
- Frequency: Quarterly (with online mid-issues)
- Total circulation: 80,014 (2012)
- Founded: 1988
- Company: Are Media
- Country: Australia
- Language: English
- Website: girlfriend.com.au
- ISSN: 1033-7288

Girlfriend magazine is an Australian teen girls magazine established in December 1988 by Futura Publications. Since 2020, the magazine has been owned by Are Media.

== Girlfriend Model Search ==
The Girlfriend Model Search is a modelling competition. In past years, the model search has been sponsored by Priceline, Schwarzkopf, CoverGirl and Rimmel London. with selected 2007 national finalists even being appointed as the faces of "Schwarzkopf LIVE Colour" semi-permanent hair colorant products.

Finalists

Year	Winner	Finalists
1990	Kristina Thornton	Karen James, Elizabeth Gray, Caroline Bailey, Lynda Gerritsen
1991	Amanda Gleeson	
1992	Tina Cianci	Rhye Costello, Brydie Cavanagh, Kylie Geihlick, Chantelle Leahy
1993	Wanita Wright	Olivia Treharne, Kate Millis, Jane Bourne, Samantha Froggatt
1994	Tenille Petrelli	Suzi Kojic, Kathryn Heal, Solae Riley, Jessica De Ryk, Tiffany Power, Zrinka Lovrencic
1995	Emma Scanlon	Lidija Bosnjak, Lisa Seiffert, Justine Davis, Kelsey Bryne, Agnes Buscu
1996	Jodie Hunter	Juliette Jasinski, Angelique Naude, Nicole Abbott, Rebecca Seidel, Ivona Cablewski
1997	Alyssa Sutherland	Adrienne Nicholls, Tammy Knox, Korrin Reardon, Melissa Bain
1998	Tione Hawkins	Joanna Hughes, Lavina Hart, Aliescha Parks, Kristy Ryan, Ana Mikulic
1999	Amelia Chandler, Kate McGinnity	Kali Dempster, Jemma Maio, Belinda Slater
2000	Madelin Tomelty	Tamara Gitsham, Julia Olah, Kasia Grabowski, Angela McKay, Keita Van Ewyk
2002	Victoria Keon-Cohen	Lauren Walshe, Michelle Reilly, Sarah Arnold, Pania Rose, Natalie Hodges
2003	Catherine McNeil	Amber Vucka, Ruby Rose Langenheim, Talisha King, Rikki Stowers, Tully Smyth
2004	Abbey Lee Kershaw	Kathryn, Allegra Carpenter, Elle Treleven, Samantha Harris, Amelia Jennings
2005	Amy Fromm	Mia Saffer, Kristie-Lee, Lauren, Danielle, Emma, Maddie
2006	Sarah Stephens	Abbie, Danielle, Anastazia, Georgia, Casey
2007	Aimee and Morgan Hurst	L Gourluck, Lucy Fry, Meg Lindsay, Emma Power, Catriona Gray
2008	Kate Budrodeen	Alex Klages, Karla Reid, Josie Vann, Karina White, Gemma Weaver
2009	Karri Pledger	Abbey O'Connell, Madison Borbely, Jessica Ridolfi, Kailyn Allen, Rebecca Downes
2010	Jemma Baines	Tiffany Adcock, Bridgit Hollitt, Maddison Brown, Jacqui McGrath, Loren Harrison-Gorton
2011	Chloe Glassie	Yasmeena Osman, Zara Dobbie-Smitham, Isabella Vick, Rebecca Dupain, Claudia Reed, Dominique Roussetos, Monique Jensen
2012	Grace Simmons	Elizabeth Love, Sharnee Gates, Georgana Coles, Jade Burton, Jessica Picton-Warlow, Molly Grace Nylander, Stephanie Field
2013	Olivia Ludington	Leilani Mendez, Elizabeth Greenwood, Caitlin Brown, Caitlin Clarke, Clare Stunzner, Mikayla Schnabel, Selina Polyak, Hollyarabella Thomas, Rose Freemantle, Brook Crompton, Rebecca Bomgaars
2014	Lilli Watt	Leah Bell, Meg Thurston, Avril Campbell, Rhiannon Proper, Emily McDonald
2015	Emily Rink	Ava Peterson, Viviana Harris, Netra Hankins, Paloma Hill, Tiarna Elle Herbert
2016	Imani Dilworth	Alysha Bandy, Lilly Moreau, Paris Julia, Rose Lowrie, Chanice Jean-Pierre

== Girlfriend Fiction ==
Girlfriend Fiction is a collaboration with Allen & Unwin. There are 20 novels in the series. The novels are written by a variety of authors, who write from a teenage girl's point of view.

=== Novels ===
- My Life and Other Catastrophes – Rowena Mohr (February 2008, Allen & Unwin) ISBN 978-1-74175-286-1
- The Indigo Girls – Penni Russon (February 2008, Allen & Unwin) ISBN 978-1-74175-292-2
- She's With the Band – Georgia Clark (May 2008, Allen & Unwin) ISBN 978-1-74175-287-8
- Always Mackenzie – Kate Constable (May 2008, Allen & Unwin) ISBN 978-1-74175-293-9
- The (Not Quite) Perfect Boyfriend – Lili Wilkinson (August 2008, Allen & Unwin) ISBN 978-1-74175-346-2
- Step Up and Dance – Thalia Kalkipsakis (August 2008, Allen & Unwin) ISBN 978-1-74175-555-8
- Sweet Life – Rebecca Lim (November 2008, Allen & Unwin) ISBN 978-1-74175-531-2
- Cassie – Barry Jonsberg (November 2008, Allen & Unwin) ISBN 978-1-74175-347-9
- Bookmark Days – Scot Gardner (January 2009, Allen & Unwin) ISBN 978-1-74175-578-7
- Winter of Grace – Kate Constable (January 2009, Allen & Unwin) ISBN 978-1-74175-620-3
- Something More – Mo Johnson (April 2009, Allen & Unwin) ISBN 978-1-74175-528-2
- Big Sky – Melaina Faranda (April 2009, Allen & Unwin) ISBN 978-1-74175-711-8
- Little Bird – Penni Russon (July 2009, Allen & Unwin) ISBN 978-1-74175-864-1
- What Supergirl Did Next – Thalia Kalkipsakis (July 2009, Allen & Unwin) ISBN 978-1-74175-867-2
- Fifteen Love – R. M. Corbet (October 2009, Allen & Unwin) ISBN 978-1-74237-015-6
- A Letter from Luisa – Rowena Mohr (October 2009, Allen & Unwin) ISBN 978-1-74175-874-0
- Dear Swoosie – Kate Constable and Penni Russon (January 2010, Allen & Unwin) ISBN 978-1-74237-198-6
- Thirteen Pearls – Melaina Faranda (April 2010, Allen & Unwin) ISBN 978-1-74237-202-0
- The Boy/Friend – R. M. Corbet (June 2010, Allen & Unwin) ISBN 978-1-74237-286-0
- Three Things About Daisy Blue – Kate Gordon (October 2010, Allen & Unwin) ISBN 9781742372129
