= Fireworks and Darkness =

2002 novel by Natalie Jane Prior

- First edition
- Author: Natalie Jane Prior
- Cover artist: Getty Images, Shutterstock
- Language: English
- Genre: Young adult, crime, speculative fiction
- Publisher: Angus & Robertson
- Publication date: 1 May 2002
- Publication place: Australia
- Media type: Print (Paperback)
- Pages: 211 (first edition)
- ISBN: 0-207-19971-X
- Followed by: Star Locket

Fireworks and Darkness is a 2002 young adult novel by Natalie Jane Prior. It follows the story of Simeon Runciman who is a firework maker and former dark magician who is caught up in murder and magic when his enemy reappears. It is followed by a companion book entitled Star Locket which was published in 2006.

== Background ==
Fireworks and Darkness was first published in Australia on 1 May 2002 by Angus & Robertson in trade paperback format. In 2006 it was re-released in mass market paperback format. Fireworks and Darkness won the 2003 Davitt Award for best young-adult novel and was a short-list nominee for the 2002 Aurealis Award for best young-adult novel but lost to The Hand of Glory by Sophie Masson.

== Synopsis ==
Set in Ostermark, an analogue of 18th and 19th century Vienna, the book follows the story of Casimir, son of Simeon Runciman, a political activist and firework maker. Magic exists and is known in Ostermark, but is heavily restricted or outright forbidden.

Magic in the world of Ostermark is an unnatural and risky practice that involves manipulating causality to alter events in ways that suit the magician, but which always have a price. During the opening events of the novel, Casimir falls from a scaffolding to his death, but is saved by Simeon’s magic, who reveals himself to be a former magician in the process; it is revealed that in order to save Casimir’s life, another young boy somewhere in the world simultaneously died to preserve balance.

Casimir’s peaceful life is upended when his father vanishes following this event and an old rival of Simeon’s determined to destroy him arrives in the city. In searching for his father and trying to clear his name, Casimir becomes embroiled in a political conspiracy involving Ostermark’s ruling royal family, who accuse him of not just being a magician but being involved in his father’s anarchist political activities.
