= Zones (novel) =

1997 novel by Damien Broderick

- Zones first edition cover
- Author: Damien Broderick and Rory Barnes
- Language: English
- Genre: Young adult, science fiction
- Published: 1997 (Moonstone)
- Publication place: Australia
- Media type: Print (Paperback)
- Pages: 224 (first edition)
- ISBN: 0-7322-5760-3

Zones is a 1997 young adult science fiction novel by Damien Broderick and Rory Barnes. It follows the story of Jenny who receives a phone call from another year.

== Publishing history ==
Zones was first published in Australia in 1997 by Moonstone, a division of HarperCollins Australia, in trade paperback format. In 2004 it was released as a braille book by Vision Australia Information and Library Service. In 2012, it appeared in print in the US for the first time, from Borgo/Wildside.

== Synopsis ==
The protagonist is a teenager called Jenny who lives in Melbourne in the late 1990s with her father and enjoys physics. She has a typical life until receiving a phone call from a boy from the year 1965.

== Awards ==
Zones was a short-list nominee for the 1997 Aurealis Award for best young-adult novel and best science fiction novel but lost to Catherine Jinks' Eye to Eye and Greylands by Isobelle Carmody in the young-adult category and to Broderick's The White Abacus in the science fiction category.
