= Monster Blood Tattoo: Foundling =

Book by D. M. Cornish

Monster Blood Tattoo Book One: Foundling
- First United States edition cover art.
- Author: D.M. Cornish
- Cover artist: D.M. Cornish
- Language: English
- Genre: Fantasy novel
- Set in: The Half-Continent
- Publisher: G.P. Putnam's Sons
- Publication date: 2006
- Publication place: Australian
- Media type: Print (Hardback)
- Pages: 434 pp
- ISBN: 0-399-24638-X
- OCLC: 62888380
- LC Class: PZ7.C816368 Fou 2006
- Followed by: Monster Blood Tattoo: Lamplighter

Foundling is the first book of Monster Blood Tattoo, a children's/young adult's fantasy trilogy written by Australian author D.M. Cornish, published in 2006 to a mixed reception. It won Best Young Adult Novel at the 2006 Aurealis Awards and was put on the Best Books for Young Adults list by the American Library Association in 2007.

The story follows Rossamünd Bookchild, a boy unfortunately christened with a girl's name, who has lived his entire life in a foundlingery (kind of an orphanage) before he is chosen to become a lamplighter in a far away city. The book's action takes place entirely on the Half-Continent, a Dickensian world run by arcane science and alchemy, and plagued with deadly (and not-so-deadly) monsters.

Prejudice, Identity, and Growth are key themes of the book as Rossamünd struggles to define himself and his feelings towards monsters and others in society after leaving the Foundlingery.

== Narrative ==
=== Plot summary ===
Much to Rossamünd's surprise, instead of a sailing life he is summoned to begin life as a lamplighter in the coastal city of High Vesting, far away to the south. After being prepared for his journey by his masters, he receives his instructions from a leer (a spy who has a special box with organs in it to enhance his sense of smell) and sets off on a river voyage on the Hogshead, a ram captained by an intimidating man named Poundinch. However he soon learns that he has been tricked onto the wrong ship, and is now slave to a band of criminals. He learns little of their trade other than that they are smuggling some kind of terrible contraband. Rossamünd only narrowly escapes fate as a captive cabin boy when, unwilling to reveal their cargo to river gatekeepers, the criminals are attacked by rams of the navy.

Rossamünd, having escaped the river battle, reaches the riverbank and struggles through the wilderness on his own. He comes close to death before being found by Miss Europe, a fulgar (a type of lahzar, or monster hunter) who can fire lightning from her hands. Her powers are demonstrated to Rossamünd as they come across the Misbegotten Schrewd, an ettin (a very large monster). It shows some level of intelligence and no outward hostility, and so Rossamünd cannot help but sympathise with it as it is slain by Miss Europe.

Their party is attacked soon after by grinnlings (also known as nimbleschrewds, a small and particularly nasty breed of monster) and the creepy leer Licurius, Miss Europe's personal servant, is killed. Rossamünd drags the badly-wounded and unconscious fulgar to Harefoot Dig, a wayhouse on the road to High Vesting, where she is healed and rested. While staying at the Dig, Rossamünd becomes privy to Miss Europe's reputation and hears her referred to as the Branden Rose, a name with infamy attached to it. Miss Europe also begins to refer to Rossamünd as her factotum (a servantile position previously held by Licurius). Rossamünd is torn between his predestined career of lamplighting, and this new prospect. To replace the deceased Licurius in the short term however, Rossamünd is charged with hiring a new carriage driver in the nearby town of Silvernook. There he finds the postman Fouracres, a friendly man who is all too willing to help, who seems to be a monster-sympathiser. The party now leave the wayhouse and after uneventful travel they reach High Vesting - Rossamünd's original destination.

Two weeks having passed since Rossamünd left the Marine Society, he is eager to get to his new place of employment but Miss Europe has business to attend to. Rossamünd is left to explore the city. He comes across the Hogshead docked in the harbour, and is confronted by Poundinch. The captain, assuming Rossamünd to be snooping into his mysterious, live, and probably-illegal cargo, ties Rossamünd to one of the crates in the hold and leaves him there. Rossamünd gives up hope of being rescued until whatever is inside the crate begins talking to him. It turns out to be a glamgorn (a friendly, little, human-like bogle) named Freckle. The other crates do not contain such friendly creatures however, and Rossamünd realises Poundinch's trade: smuggling deceased human bodyparts to be put together into new, horrible creatures like those in the other crates. The captain soon returns and removes Rossamünd from the hold, but not before Freckle hints at some hidden significance to the foundling's name.

Poundinch leads Rossamünd to one of his other ships, but Rossamünd escapes the captain and flees - right to the safety of Fouracres and Miss Europe. Miss Europe takes the captain out with one electric shock, and Poundinch falls into the caustic water of the harbour. Rossamünd insists that the three of them go back to the Hogshead to rescue Freckle, and they do just that (Freckle immediately disappearing into the sea), but the subsequent realisation that Freckle is a bogle sparks momentary hostility between Miss Europe and the foundling. However, they continue on to find Rossamünd's employers. On the way, Miss Europe reveals that she is suffering from an undetermined illness, and must travel far away to where she was altered into a lahzar so she can be treated. She promises to return after a while to see how Rossamünd is faring in his lamplighting career, and to again offer him the position of her factotum. Accepting this, he bids Miss Europe and Fouracres farewell.

Rossamünd discovers that Mister Germanicus, whom he was supposed to report to in High Vesting, had given up waiting for the foundling and had moved on north to Winstermill. He sets off in a coach, accompanied now only by parting gifts from Miss Europe: food, more gold than Rossamünd had ever seen in his life, and a note revealing the lahzar's true identity - Europa, a duchess-in-waiting, set to one day rule over the rich city of Naimes. Soon enough Rossamünd reaches Winstermill, and is signed into service by two registrars, friendly Inkwill and nasty Witherscrawl. He is also given a letter, written five days earlier by Verline from the Marine Society. This letter reveals that Master Fransitart will soon be on his way to see Rossamünd, and is bearing some kind of distressing news. Completely confused, Rossamünd goes to bed. He will begin his career as a lamplighter at the dawn.

=== Characters ===
- Rossamund Bookchild: The protagonist, a young boy with an unfortunate girl's name. He is an orphan raised in a foundlingery and embarks on a journey to become a lamplighter. Rossamund is kind-hearted, curious, and brave, though often unsure of himself.
- Miss Europe (The Branden Rose): A fulgar (a type of monster hunter) who can wield lightning. She is a fierce and enigmatic character who becomes a protector and mentor to Rossamund during his journey.
- Licurius: Miss Europe's leer (a spy with enhanced senses). He is a mysterious and somewhat unsettling figure who meets a tragic fate.
- Poundinch: The captain of the Hogshead, a ship Rossamund mistakenly boards. He is a gruff and intimidating character involved in criminal activities.
- Madam Opera: The headmistress of the foundlingery where Rossamund grows up. She is strict but cares deeply for the children under her care.
- Gosling: A bully at the foundlingery who torments Rossamund because of his name.

== Supplementary material ==
The last 120 pages of the book consist of supplementary material, the large part of which is an extensive glossary. Also included are numerous charts, diagrams, illustrations and maps.

=== Explicarium ===
The major part of the book's supplementary material is the Explicarium, an extensive alphabetical glossary of terms and explanations, names and place-names. This glossary includes definitions for commonly used terms in the Half-Continent, and biographical information about characters. The glossary often steps outside of the book's narrative and explains things in terms of our world. It also includes information on people and things not present in the first book of the series, but may be coming in later books.

=== Appendices ===
Following the Explicarium are a series of eight appendices, listed below.

- Appendix 1a: The 16-month calendar of the Half-Continent.
- Appendix 1b: Days of the week and vigils (days of observance).
- Appendix 2: A labelled illustration of a haubardier (foot-soldier), detailing the uniform.
- Appendix 3: The Körnchenflecter (a diagram of the reactions between the four elements).
- Appendix 4: A labelled illustration of a navigator of the Empire's navy, again detailing the uniform.
- Appendix 5: A labelled illustration of a wayfarer of the Soutlands.
- Appendix 6: Diagrams of the rams-of-war (boats of the navy).
- Appendix 7: Diagram of the Hogshead, the ram Rossamünd sails on for a part of the book.
- Appendix 8: An illustration: "Harold faces the Slothog alone before the gates of Clementine".

=== Maps ===
Following the appendices is an exploded view of the Half-Continent. This is a large version (divided into eight pages) of the map provided at the start of the book. One other map is provided at the front of the book, being an even closer view of the area of the world in which Foundling's events take part.

=== Illustrations ===
Not counting the maps and drawings in the Explicarium, the book contains 16 full-page illustrations by the author, one included in each chapter. These detail characters and costumes, as well as various monsters from the book's storyline. The book's cover art is also by Cornish himself, and differs slightly between the Australian and American editions of the book. Both editions depict, in silhouette form, the satyr-like monster Rossamünd and Fouracres encounter on the road from Silvernook back to the Harefoot Dig.

== Major characters ==
Rossamund Bookchild: An orphan living a sheltered life at Madam Opera's Estimable Marine Society For Foundling Boys And Girls, where he is trained to be a sailor. He is later hired into the lamplighting service, and departs upon a ram to go to the headquarters a Winstermill. Along the way he falls in with various extraordinary characters. He is skilled with potives, and has dangerous feelings for monsters.

Europe: Better known as The Branden Rose, Europe is a famous monster hunter who, along with her treacherous manservant Licurious, meets Rossamund in the wild. She is cold and distant at times, and very mysterious. She is a fulgar, or a person who can shoot electricity from her hands.

Poundinch: A ram's captain, and smuggler, Poundinch goes up and down the river in his boat the Hogshead, dealing in dark supplies. He tricks Rossamund onto his boat, and holds him hostage

Fouracres: A traveling postman who befriends Rossamund, and has a strange view on the world.

Fransitart: A teacher at Madam Opera's and an old sailor, he is one of Rossamund's few friends. He harbors a terrible secret he must tell Rossamund.

Craumpalin: The potives teacher at Madam Opera's and Fransitart and Rossamund's friend. He was a sailor with Fransitart, and taught Rossamund all he knows about potives.
