= Rory Barnes =

Australian writer of popular fiction

- Born: 1946 (age 79–80); London
- Writing career
- Period: 1983–present
- Genre: Speculative fiction
- Website: members.optusnet.com.au/~rory.barnes

Rory Barnes (born 1946) is an Australian writer of popular fiction. Although born in London, he has lived most of his life in Australia.

== Bibliography ==
- Valencies (1983 with Damien Broderick)
- The Bomb-Monger's Daughter (1984)
- Water From The Moon (1989 with James Birrell)
- Zones (1997 with Damien Broderick)
- The Book of Revelation (1998 with Damien Broderick) Reprinted in the US as Dark Gray (2010)
- Horsehead Boy (1998)
- Horsehead Man (1999)
- Stuck in Fast Forward (1999 with Damien Broderick, revised and extended as The Hunger of Time)
- Horsehead Soup (2000)
- Night Vision (2006)
- I'm Dying Here (2009 with Damien Broderick, also known as I Suppose a Root's Out of the Question)
- The Dragon Raft (2010)
- Human's Burden (2010 with Damien Broderick)
- Space Junk (2011)
- The Valley of the God of Our Choice, Inc. (2014 with Damien Broderick)

== Nominations ==
Aurealis Awards

- Best science fiction novel
  - 1997: Nomination: Zones (with Damien Broderick)
  - 1999: Nomination: The Book of Revelation (with Damien Broderick)
- Best young-adult novel
  - 1997: Nomination: Zones (with Damien Broderick)
  - 1998: Nomination: Horsehead Boy
  - 1999: Nomination: Horsehead Man
  - 1999: Nomination: Stuck in Fast Forward (with Damien Broderick)
  - 2000: Nomination: Horsehead Soup

Ditmar Awards

- Best Australian long science fiction or fantasy
  - 1984: Nomination: Valencies (with Damien Broderick)
- Best novel
  - 2000: Nomination: The Book of Revelation (with Damien Broderick)

Children's Book Council of Australia

- 1998: Listed as Notable Australian Children's Book: Zones
- 1999: Listed as Notable Australian Children's Book: Horsehead Boy
