= Magic Lessons =

2nd part of Magic or Madness trilogy

- cover image
- Author: Justine Larbalestier
- Language: English
- Series: Magic or Madness
- Publisher: Razorbill
- Publication date: 2006
- Publication place: Australia
- Pages: 275
- ISBN: 978-1-59514-124-8
- OCLC: 61687593
- Preceded by: Magic or Madness
- Followed by: Magic's Child

Magic Lessons is the second installment in Justine Larbalestier's Magic or Madness trilogy. It was released in 2006.

== Plot summary ==
When a golem pulls Reason into New York, she calls Danny Galeano, Jay-Tee's eighteen-year-old brother, for help. Danny allows Reason to stay with him while she tries to trace the golem, although her feelings for him grow until she eventually sleeps with him, despite Danny continually saying that it is not right. Meanwhile, Jay-Tee nearly dies while running, and Tom is forced to give her some of his magic.

Reason, who is 15 finds out that she's pregnant with Danny's baby and is happy, because her own mother was pregnant with Reason at 15.

== Awards ==
The sequel, Magic Lessons, was shortlisted for an Aurealis Award for best young adult novel as well as a Locus award. It was a best book of the year selection for Inside a Dog and the CCBC Choices List, as well as making the 2006 Locus Recommended Reading List.
