= Magic's Child =

2007 novel by Justine Larbalestier

- cover image
- Author: Justine Larbalestier
- Language: English
- Series: Magic or Madness
- Genre: Fantasy novel
- Publisher: Razorbill
- Publication date: March 22, 2007
- ISBN: 1-59514-064-6
- OCLC: 82673251
- LC Class: PZ7.L32073 Mah 2007
- Preceded by: Magic Lessons

Magic's Child is the third installment in Justine Larbalestier's Magic or Madness trilogy. Here, Reason Cansino tries to tell Danny Galeano that she is pregnant with his child and that Jason Blake is coming close to succeeding.
