= Glenda Millard =

Australian writer

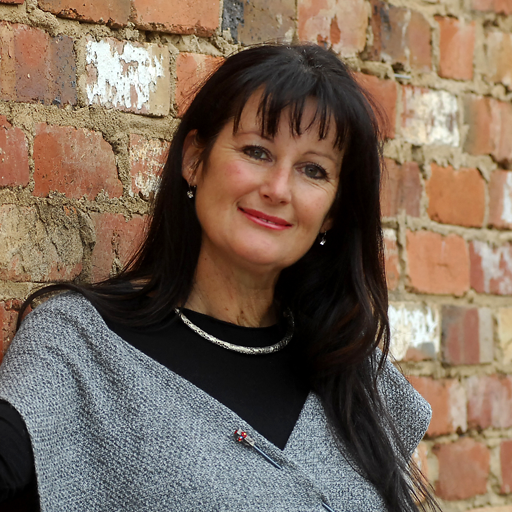
- Born: Victoria, Australia
- Writing career
- Genres: Children's literature, young adult fiction
- Website: glendamillard.com

Glenda Millard is an Australian writer of children's literature and young adult fiction.

== Biography ==
Millard was born in Victoria, Australia. Her first work was published in 1999 by Margaret Hamilton Books, entitled Unplugged!. In 2003 she released The Naming of Tishkin Silk which was named as an honour book at the 2004 CBCA Awards and was a finalist for the 2004 New South Wales Premier's Literary Awards. In 2007 Layla, Queen of Hearts, a follow-up to The Naming Of Tishkin Silk, won the 2007 Queensland Premier's Literary Award for Children's Book and was a short-list nominee for the Children's Book of the Year Award for younger readers. In 2009 Millard released her young-adult fiction novel A Small Free Kiss in the Dark and the children's novel Perry Angel's Suitcase. A Small Free Kiss in the Dark was a short-list nominee for the 2009 Aurealis Award for best young-adult novel but lost to Scott Westerfeld's Leviathan and Perry Angel's Suitcase won the 2009 Children's Book of the Year Award for younger readers. Millard is currently an ambassador for the Victorian Premier's Reading Challenge.

== Bibliography ==
=== Novels ===
The Kingdom of Silk series

- The Naming Of Tishkin Silk (2003, illustrations by Caroline Magerl)
- Layla, Queen of Hearts (2006, illustrations by Stephen Michael King)
- Perry Angel's Suitcase (2008, illustrations by Stephen Michael King)
- All the Colours of Paradise (2009, illustrations by Stephen Michael King)
- Plum Puddings and Paper Moons (2010, illustrations by Stephen Michael King)
- The Tender Moments of Saffron Silk (2012, illustrations by Stephen Michael King)
- Nell's Festival of Crisp Winter Glories (2013, illustrations by Stephen Michael King)

Other novels

- When the Angels Came (2003, illustrations by Janine Dawson)
- Bringing Reuben Home (2004)
- The Novice (2005)
- A Small Free Kiss in the Dark (2009)
- The Stars at Oktober Bend (2016)

=== Picture books ===
- Unplugged! (1999, illustrated by Dee Huxley)
- Bones Maloney and the Raspberry Spiders (2002, illustrated by Matt Cosgrove)
- Heart of the Tiger (2004, illustrated by Gaye Chapman)
- Mrs Wiggins' Wartymelons (2004, with Steven Axelson)
- Angel Breath (2005, illustrated by Dee Huxley)
- Kaito's Cloth (2006, illustrated by Gaye Chapman)
- Applesauce and the Christmas Miracle (2008, illustrated by Stephen Michael King)
- Isabella's Garden (2009, illustrated by Rebecca Cool)
- Mbobo Tree (2010, illustrated by Annie White)

Source: WorldCat

== Awards and nominations ==
- The Naming of Tishkin Silk
  - Nomination: 2004 New South Wales Premier's Literary Awards
  - Honoured: 2004 CBCA Awards
- Heart of the Tiger
  - Nomination: 2005 Crichton Award
- The Novice
  - 2006 White Raven
- Kaito's Cloth
  - 2007 White Raven
  - Nomination: 2007 Queensland Premier's Literary Awards – Children's Book Award
- Layla, Queen of Hearts
  - Win: 2007 Queensland Premier's literary Awards – Children's Book Award
  - Nomination: 2007 Children's Book of the Year Award: Younger Readers
- A Small Free Kiss in the Dark
  - Nomination: 2009 Aurealis Award for best young-adult novel
- Perry Angel's Suitcase
  - Win: 2009 Children's Book of the Year Award: Younger Readers
- The Duck and The Darklings
  - Short-listed: 2015 Patricia Wrightson Prize for Children's Literature, New South Wales Premier's Awards 2015 (with Stephen Michael King)

Source: showtell.com.au
