= Anthony Eaton =

Australian writer

- Born: 1972 (age 53–54); Papua New Guinea
- Occupation: Writer
- Writing career
- Period: 2000-present
- Genres: Children's, Fantasy, history, Young adult
- Notable awards: Aurealis Award; Best young-adult novel 2007 Skyfall
- Website: www.anthonyeaton.com

Anthony Eaton is an Australian writer of fantasy and young adult fiction.

== Biography ==
Eaton was born in Papua New Guinea in 1972 and moved to Perth, Western Australia and the Cocos Islands during his childhood. After attending university he worked as a literature and drama teacher at Trinity College, Perth for eight years. He later graduated from the University of Western Australia with a PhD for his thesis "Nightpeople, book one of the Darklands trilogy: and 'Young adult friction: the blurring of adolescence and adulthood as reflected in Australian young adult literature, 1982–2006'".

He currently lives in Canberra and is a lecturer at the University of Canberra.

=== Writing ===
In 2000 Eaton's first novel was released in Australia, entitled The Darkness. It won the 2001 Western Australian Premier's award for Young Adult Literature and was a short-list nominee for the 2000 Aurealis Award for best fantasy novel. He then released two more books in 2001 and in 2003. In 2004 Eaton released Fireshadow, which won the Western Australian Premier's award for Young Adult Literature and was named as an honour book in the CBCA Book of the Year Awards. In 2005 he started his Darklands Trilogy with the first book, Nightpeople, being a short-list nominee for the 2005 Aurealis Award for best fantasy novel and best young-adult novel. In 2007 the second book in the trilogy, Skyfall won the 2007 Aurealis Award for best young-adult novel and in 2008 Into White Silence was named an honour book in the 2009 CBCA Book of the Year awards and was a short-list nominee for the Queensland Premier's Literary Awards.

== Bibliography ==
=== Novels ===
- The Darkness (2000)
- A New Kind of Dreaming (2001)
- Fireshadow (2004)
- Into White Silence (2008)

The Darklands Trilogy

- Nightpeople (2005)
- Skyfall (2007)
- Daywards (2010)

=== Children's fiction ===
Nathan Nuttboard Trilogy

- Nathan Nuttboard Hits the Beach (2003)
- Nathan Nuttboard Family Matters (2006)
- Nathan Nuttboard Upstaged (2008)

Other children's fiction

- The Girl In The Cave (2005)
