= Monster Blood Tattoo: Lamplighter =

Young adult fantasy novel by D. M. Cornish

Monster Blood Tattoo Book Two: Lamplighter
- Author: D.M. Cornish
- Language: English
- Series: Monster Blood Tattoo Series
- Genre: Fantasy novel
- Publisher: G.P. Putnam's Sons
- Publication date: 2006
- Publication place: Australia
- Media type: Print (Hardback)
- Pages: 433 pp
- Preceded by: Monster Blood Tattoo: Foundling
- Followed by: Monster Blood Tattoo: Factotum

Lamplighter is a 2006 young adult fantasy novel by D. M. Cornish and is the second in the Monster Blood Tattoo Series.

The book covers Rossamünd's final weeks as a prentice-lighter, the internal politics of the Lamplighters, his first posting, court-martial and leaving the service.

== Background ==
Lamplighter was due for release in May 2007 but was delayed to late April 2008. On 16 October 2007, D.M. Cornish announced on his blogsite that the Australian and New Zealand version of Lamplighter had just gone to the printers.

== Reception ==
In a starred review, Booklist's Sally Estes wrote,

The setting, characterizations, and relationships are as well limned as in Foundling (2006), and the suspense is palpable as the two young people find themselves facing incredible survival odds. Once again, Cornish's black-and-white drawings and the Explicarium, a glossary more than 100 pages long, add to the whole, and once again, the conclusion is a cliff-hanger.

Kirkus Reviews critiqued Cornish's writing style, writing that he "again buries a likable protagonist and perfectly viable plot under a mountain of obscure words and pretentious prose". They further explained,

Cornish characterizes Rossamünd with a light touch, fear and sadness mingling with hints about unusual roots, as he does Numps, mentally wounded from a monster attack and living underground with his friend, a plant that makes lamps glow. However, the turgid narrative voice clashes with Rossamünd’s gentleness as he ponders moral subtleties in a forcefully verbose prose, crammed with archaic English words on top of a fantasy terminology that apparently requires a 94-page glossary (which, despite its length, often fails to clarify).

Booklist reviewed the audiobook, as well.
