= How to Ditch Your Fairy =

2008 young adult novel by Justine Larbalestier

- Cover image
- Author: Justine Larbalestier
- Language: English
- Publisher: Bloomsbury
- Publication date: March 2008
- Publication place: Australia
- Media type: Print (Paperback, Hardback)
- Pages: 320
- ISBN: 978-1-59990-301-9
- OCLC: 213358000

How to Ditch Your Fairy is a young adult novel by Australian writer Justine Larbalestier. It was published in 2008 by Bloomsbury.

== Plot ==
How to Ditch Your Fairy is set in a world where many people have their own personal fairy. These fairies bestow certain kinds of luck on the possessor: there are loose-change-finding fairies, good-hair fairies, clothes-shopping fairies, all-boys-will-like-you fairies, parking fairies, etc. Charlie (short for Charlotte) has a parking fairy; if she is in a car, a perfect parking spot is found on the first try. But Charlie is only 14 and she does not drive, so she thinks she has been cursed. She wants a fairy similar to that of her best friend Rochelle, who has a clothes-shopping fairy, or her frenemy Fiorenze, who has an every-boy-will-like-you fairy.

Charlie's attempts to starve her fairy away by walking everywhere collects her demerits for lateness at her school, New Avalon Sports High, where the focus is on sports. The water polo star, Danders Anders (who seems to have very poor communication and does not understand no), virtually kidnaps her in his car to go to illegal gambling places and which drastically halts her attempt to remove the fairy. And when the pulchritudinous new boy, Steffi, on whom she has a crush appears to fall for Fiorenze, Charlie gets drastic.

She and Fiorenze, who actually hates her fairy, join forces, with Charlie discovering that Fiorenze is not a bad person, and they hatch a plan to switch their fairies, and she learns to be careful about what she wishes for and how the grass is always greener. With the every-boy-will-like-you fairy, girls turn on Charlie, and she wonders whether Steffi likes her or if he is just responding to her fairy.

The story is about Charlie’s quest to get rid of her fairy, get her first boyfriend, stay out of trouble at school, and get a new even better fairy to replace the old one.

== Reception ==
Critical reception for How to Ditch Your Fairy has been mostly positive, with the School Library Journal writing that it is "a typical coming-of-age story, but the addition of the fairies, the slightly alternative setting, and the made-up slang make it much more". Kirkus Reviews stated that "Fans of Larbalestier's award-winning Magic or Madness trilogy... might be put off initially by the glib tone, but this comic coming-of-age novel will entertain teen readers." Publishers Weekly praised the book, saying that it was a "vividly imagined story will charm readers". A librarian for the New York Public Library wrote that the character of Charlie was a "familiar girl" but that "by the end of the story it will be clear that this book is completely original and completely entertaining."
