= Magic or Madness =

2005 novel by Justine Larbalestier

- Cover image
- Author: Justine Larbalestier
- Language: English
- Series: Magic or Madness
- Genre: Fantasy Fiction
- Publisher: Razorbill
- Publication date: 2005
- Publication place: Australia
- Pages: 788
- ISBN: 978-1-59514-022-7
- OCLC: 56386932
- Followed by: Magic Lessons

Magic or Madness is a fantasy novel for young adults by Justine Larbalestier. First published in 2005, it is the first installment in the Magic or Madness trilogy. The novel won the 2007 Andre Norton Award for Young Adult Science Fiction and Fantasy.

== Plot summary ==
The three main characters are Reason Cansino, Sarafina Cansino and Esmeralda Cansino. Reason and her mother Sarafina have been on the run from her grandmother Esmeralda for fifteen years staying in one place for seldom more than a few months. Her whole life Reason has been brought up with a hate for Esmeralda who believes in the practicing of magic and horrifying ritual. Only once does she recall being within her grasp but now Sarafina has had an unexpected mental breakdown, and Reason is forced back to the one place she never thought she would go back to. But after finding a portal within Esmeralda's house she starts to question her mother's beliefs and face the truth, that magic is real.

== Characters ==
- Reason Cansino
- Esmeralda Cansino
- Sarafina Cansino
- Julieta (Jay-Tee)
- Tom
- Jason Blake

== Reception ==
By turns a fantasy adventure and a thoughtful examination of relationships, this radiant gem stands alone, but expect readers to be impatient for the rest of the trilogy

—School Library Journal

Magic or Madness is a breath of fresh air. The characters are unforgettable, the voice delightful, the plot tense and compelling.This is the kind of book you take in at a gulp and, having reached the last page, put it down reluctantly. More please!"

—Karen Joy Fowler, author of The Jane Austen Book Club

=== Awards ===
Magic or Madness won the 2007 Andre Norton Award. It was shortlisted for the Ethel Turner Award, one of the New South Wales Premier's Literary Awards for 2006, as well as an Aurealis Award for best young adult novel and a Ditmar Award for Best Novel. It was also nominated for The Teen Services Division of the Michigan Library Association's Thumbs Up Award. Magic or Madness was a best book of the year selection for the School Library Journal, Tayshas (the Young Adult Round Table of the Texas Library Association), the Australian children’s literature magazine Magpies, as well as making the ALA (American Library Association) 2006 Best Books for Young Adults list, the Locus Recommended Reading List and the Bank Street Best Teen Books of the Year list.
