= Jemma Baines =

South Australian fashion model (born 1994)

- Born: 17 August 1994 (age 32); Adelaide, Australia
- Occupation: Model
- Years active: 2010–present
- Modeling information
- Height: 1.78 m (5 ft 10 in)
- Hair color: Blonde
- Eye color: Blue

Jemma Baines (born 17 August 1994), is a South Australian fashion model. Baines won the annual model search hosted by Girlfriend Magazine in 2010 when she was 16, and has since been named one of Australia's new top models and one of the top forty international models of the Autumn/Winter 13/14 season by Vogue Germany.

== Early life ==
Baines was born in Adelaide and was raised in Grange, a coastal suburb of Adelaide. She was born to Jacqueline and popular Adelaide surrealist artist Andrew Baines. She has two sisters, Skye and Amber. Even as a child at age 2, she says that she knew that she wanted to become a model, and she confesses to The Daily Telegraph that she was "sitting in class reading Vogue magazines instead of doing [her] school work." She had braces up until the end of 2010 and was attending St Aloysius College as her career was kick-started.

== Career ==
=== 2010–11 ===
Baines' father had told her earlier to postpone her dreams of becoming a model until she grew taller, so she was finally named a state finalist in the inaugural Girlfriend Rimmel Model Search when she was 15 in 2010. She was eventually announced the overall winner at Sydney function venue Simmer on the Bay in November 2010, scoring the contracts with Chic Model Management, NEXT Model Management and the December fashion shoot with Girlfriend Magazine.

She made her runway debut at the 2011 RAFW in Sydney, modelling for labels such as Zimmerman, Romance Was Born, Miss Unkon, Christopher Esber and Lover. Her first editorial was for Grazia Australia fashion in early 2011. She soon after modelled for popular Australian names such as Peter Alexander, Russh and the Australian version of Harper's Bazaar.

=== 2012–present ===
Baines scored her first international cover in February 2012 for L'Officiel Singapore after the magazine was impressed by the results of the shoot, which was based in Glenorchy, New Zealand. She has since modelled for names such as Request QJ Magazine, Marie Claire Australia, Elle, L'Express Style, Glamour, Oyster, Grazia France and Blugirl.

In September 2014, Baines scored her first Vogue shoot for Vogue Australia beauty.
