= Striped Holes =

1988 sf novel by Australian author Damien Broderick

- First edition cover
- Author: Damien Broderick
- Language: English
- Series: The Faustus Hexagram
- Genre: Novel
- Publisher: Avon
- Publication date: November 1988
- Publication place: USA
- Media type: Print
- Pages: 179 pp.
- Awards: 1989 Ditmar Award, Best Australian Long Fiction, winner
- ISBN: 0-380-75377-4
- Preceded by: The Black Grail
- Followed by: The Sea's Furthest End

Striped Holes is a 1988 science fiction novel by Damien Broderick. Published by Avon, it won the Ditmar Award in 1989 (in the Best Australian Long Fiction category). It is the fifth novel in the author's The Faustus Hexagram series.

== Plot ==
The novel is a humorous story about how one individual, George Bone, became a God.

== Critical reception ==
In his review in Analog Science Fiction and Fact in 1989 Tom Easton concluded that the novel was "a little thin perhaps, but fun."

Reviewing the Mandarin Australia edition of the novel in 1991 critic Bruce Gillespie noted that "the prose is amusing and attractive." He went on to comment that the novel "comes into its own as soon as Broderick leaves [Douglas] Adams territory, as soon as he forgets the form and makes Broderick jokes and Melbourne references."

Other reviews include:

- Review by Janice M. Eisen in Aboriginal Science Fiction, March–April 1989
- Review by Nicholas Mahoney in Paperback Inferno, no. 78
- Review by Artur Starski in Isaac Asimov's Science Fiction 01 (02) 1992 (Polish edition)

== Publication history ==
After the novel's initial publication in USA by Avon in 1988 it was reprinted as follows:

- 1990, Mandarin, UK
- 2020, Gateway/Orion, UK
