= The Waterless Sea =

Book by Kate Constable

- First edition
- Author: Kate Constable
- Cover artist: Beth Norling
- Language: English
- Series: The Chanters of Tremaris
- Genre: Fantasy novel
- Published: 2003 (Allen & Unwin)
- Publication place: Australia
- Media type: Print (Hardback & Paperback)
- Pages: 314 (US paperback edition)
- ISBN: 0-439-55481-0
- OCLC: 55535275
- LC Class: PZ7.C7656 Wat 2005
- Preceded by: The Singer of All Songs
- Followed by: The Tenth Power

The Waterless Sea is the second book in the Chanters of Tremaris trilogy by Kate Constable.

== Premise ==
Having defeated the sorcerer Samis in the previous book, The Singer of All Songs, Calwyn and her friends encounter Heben, an exiled princeling, who tells them that children, including his siblings, are being kidnapped and imprisoned for practicing magic. The group sets off for the desert of Merithuros to rescue the captured children.they meet Darrow again there on their way back from the Palace of cobwebs with 4 of the 5 kids (one killed). They head to the Black Palace where Darrow claims the position as Lord of the Black Palace.

== Reception ==
The book received mixed reviews from critics. Timnah Card, writing for The Bulletin of the Center for Children's Books, described it as a "fast-moving epic" that fantasy fans would enjoy, but criticized the "blandness of Calwyn's character". Melissa Moore of the School Library Journal concurred, commenting that some of the secondary characters were "flat" and that parts of the plot were predictable, but still praised it as an "excellent fantasy" and more well written than the first book in the series.
