= The Singer of All Songs =

2002 novel by Kate Constable

- First edition
- Author: Kate Constable
- Cover artist: Beth Norling
- Language: English
- Series: The Chanters of Tremaris
- Subject: First edition
- Genre: Fantasy novel
- Published: 2002 (Allen & Unwin)
- Publication place: Australia
- Media type: Print (Hardback & Paperback)
- Pages: 297 (US paperback edition)
- ISBN: 0-439-55479-9
- OCLC: 234428929
- LC Class: PZ7.C7656 Si 2004
- Followed by: The Waterless Sea

The Singer of All Songs is the first novel in the Chanters of Tremaris trilogy by Kate Constable.

== Plot summary ==
Calwyn is a young priestess who lives inside Antaris, a community enclosed by an ice wall. The priestesses must maintain the wall by singing certain songs, the knowledge of which is passed down to them through the temple. Legend has it that a Singer of All Songs will someday be born, who will know and use all the songs.

One day, the Wall is breached by a traveler called Darrow, who is also a chanter. Samis, a greedy sorcerer who wants to become the Singer of All Songs and rule the world of Tremaris, follows Darrow to Antaris. Darrow and Calwyn flee by jumping into the river that flows under the Wall.

They meet Darrow's friends Tonno and Xanni to ask them for help. All four sail to Mithates to seek the help of a chanter who can help them defeat Samis. In Mithates, the men leave to try finding remnants of the fire chantments. Calwyn meets Trout, a college student, who has acquired a trumpet-like device called the Clarion of Flame. It is the last remnant of the Chantments of Fire.

Samis attacks the group to take the Clarion for himself. Everyone escapes from Mithates except Xanni, who dies from Samis' attack.

The crew are captured by pirates. Calwyn is taken aboard the pirates' ship, where she befriends the pirates' chanter, Mica. Mica teaches Calwyn how to sing a breeze.

After another narrow escape from Samus, the crew docks at the Wildlands, where they are confronted by the draconic Arakin. Calwyn uses her powers of chantment to make peace with them, revealing that she has the Power of Beasts. Darrow realizes that Calwyn is the true Singer of All Songs.

The sailors are befriended by Halasaa, one of the mute, telepathic Tree People, who is the last guardian of the powers of Becoming. He escorts the outsiders to the ancient, abandoned city of Spareth, where they meet Samis once more. Samis forces the crew into singing the different chantments. Instead of transforming Samis into a god, the Great Power he has summoned absorbs and overwhelms him. The crew are left to ponder how to realize Samis’ vision for a peaceful and united Tremaris without tyranny.

=== Reception ===
The Kirkus reviews said "the actual workings of enchantment, definitions of the powers, various characters' emotions are well sketched," however, it added, the novel "lack[s] depth." It is "not meaty, but creative," the reviewer hedged. "Calwyn," Kirkus added, is "a fairly passive protagonist."

Publishers Weekly complained that "the sheer level of detail is overwhelming at first." The review adding, however, that "those who press on through the overwhelming detail will find their efforts rewarded." The review praised "Constable for imagining a rich satisfying universe."
