= Liar (novel) =

2009 young adult thriller novel by Justine Larbalestier

- Author: Justine Larbalestier
- Language: English
- Publisher: Allen & Unwin (AU); Bloomsbury Press (US)
- Publication date: 1 October 2009
- Publication place: Australia
- Pages: 344
- ISBN: 9781741758726

Liar is a 2009 young adult thriller novel by Justine Larbalestier, published by Allen & Unwin. It is written in first person from the point of view of Micah Wilkins, who introduces herself to the reader as an unreliable narrator.

== Summary ==
The protagonist of the novel, Micah Wilkins, is a seventeen-year-old biracial girl living in New York with her parents. When the novel opens, Micah's boyfriend Zachary, who's been missing, is found dead. The story is told in segments of past and present, moving between Micah's family history (and how she met her boyfriend) and the investigation into Zach's death unfolds.

The concept of the story is that Micah is a compulsive liar. The novel is written as though Micah is writing the words, so she is aware of and refers to the audience in the text, to whom she is telling the story. In the opening she promises to tell the whole truth, but as the story continues she retracts or "corrects" statements she'd said before, claiming the new truth to be the real one.

== Reception ==
=== Awards ===
- 2009 Carl Brandon Kindred Award
- 2009 WA Premier’s Literary Award, Young Adult Prize
- 2009 Fellowship of Australian Writers (FAW) Christina Stead Award
- 2010 Davitt Award, Best Young Adult Novel, winner

== Cover art controversy ==
Liar became the focus of Internet-centered controversy when the cover of its advance reading copy (ARC) featured a young white woman with long, straight hair, while the book describes its protagonist as an African American girl with "nappy" hair. Larbalestier was among those critical of this, saying "the problem is longstanding and industry-wide. Whitewashing of covers, ghettoizing of books by people of color, and low expectations (reflected in the lack of marketing push behind the majority of these books) are not new things". The cover was changed for the mass market edition.
