= The Lost Girl (Kwaymullina book) =

Australian children's picturebook

- Author: Ambelin Kwaymullina
- Illustrator: Leanne Tobin
- Language: English
- Genre: Children's picture book
- Published: 2014 (Walker Books Australia)
- Media type: Print (hardback)
- Pages: 28 (unpaginated)
- ISBN: 9781921529634
- OCLC: 838047667

The Lost Girl is a 2014 Children's picture book written by Ambelin Kwaymullina and illustrated by Leanne Tobin. It is about an Aboriginal girl who wanders away from her mob but is then looked after, and returned, by Mother Nature.

== Reception ==
A review in Education described The Lost Girl as "an empowering voice for young Indigenous girls". A reviewer for Reading Time noted that "...she [Kwaymullina] is still teaching us by telling a story about respect for the environment, having courage and finding our way home to our elders.", and "It is Leanne Tobin’s first picture book, beautifully created and designed it showcases the landscape and imparts a strong sense of place.".

The Lost Girl has also been reviewed by The Conversation, The Sydney Morning Herald, Magpies, Australian Book Review, and Books+Publishing.

== Awards ==
- 2015 Crichton Award for Children's Book Illustration shortlist
- 2015 Speech Pathology Australia Book of the Year For Indigenous Children shortlist
- 2015 West Australian Young Readers' Book Award shortlist
