= Gabrielle Williams (author) =

Australian writer (1963–2023)

Gabrielle Eve Williams
- Born: 20 August 1963
- Died: 21 January 2023 (aged 59)
- Organization: Australian author of young adult fiction
- Known for: Australian author
- Notable work: Beatle Meets Destiny (2009); The Reluctant Hallelujah (2012); The Guy, The Girl, the Artist and His Ex (2015); My Life as a Hashtag (2017); It's Not You, It’s Me (2021)
- Spouse: Andrew Williams
- Children: 3

Gabrielle Eve Williams (20 August 1963 – 21 January 2023) was an Australian author of young adult fiction. Her books include Beatle Meets Destiny and My Life as a Hashtag.

== Career ==
Before becoming a writer, Williams worked in television and advertising. In 2009, she published her first novel, Beatle Meets Destiny, which was followed three years later by The Reluctant Hallelujah (2012). Her 2015 novel The Guy, The Girl, the Artist & his Ex was loosely based on the 1986 theft of Picasso's painting The Weeping Woman. My Life As A Hashtag, published in 2017, is a cautionary tale about the pitfalls of social media; to accurately depict her teen characters' use of social media, Williams interviewed her own children about their online habits. To develop the time travel elements in her 2021 novel It's Not You, It's Me, Williams researched both metaphysics and mysticism. This work was nominated for Best Young Adult Novel at the 2022 Aurealis Awards, which recognises the best in Australian speculative fiction. In addition to writing novels, Williams worked as a bookseller at Readings Bookshops, was a grants officer for the Readings Foundation, and managed the Readings Prizes.

== Personal life and death ==
On 16 January 2023, Williams suffered a stroke at a Readings Bookstore in Melbourne, Victoria, and was taken to hospital. She died five days later, on 21 January 2023, at the age of 59. She was survived by her husband, Andrew, and three children, Dominique, Harry and Charlie.

== Bibliography ==
- Beatle Meets Destiny (2009)
- The Reluctant Hallelujah (2012)
- The Guy, The Girl, the Artist & his Ex (2015)
- My Life as a Hashtag (2017)
- It’s Not You, It’s Me (2021)
