= The Interrogation of Ashala Wolf =

2012 novel by Ambelin Kwaymullina

- First edition
- Author: Ambelin Kwaymullina
- Language: English
- Publication date: 2012

The Interrogation of Ashala Wolf is a 2012 speculative fiction novel by Ambelin Kwaymullina. Kwaymullina's debut novel, it tells the story of a nearly utopian world after an apocalypse, where some people have begun to have magical abilities, and are persecuted and detained for it. The book's protagonist, Ashala Wolf, attempts to fight these injustices in her system and save the group of runaways she leads.

== Summary ==
Ashala Wolf, leader of a group of runaways, has been captured by the government after being betrayed by her supposed ally, Justin Connor. As Ashala attempts to survive her detainment and protect her secrets, she begins to realize that there is more going on than she knows and that she can't trust anything - even her thoughts.

== Reception ==
The Interrogation of Ashala Wolf received mostly positive reviews. Kirkus Reviews wrote that it was a "vivid, original debut" and an "exhilarating dystopia", noting that Kwaymullina's Aboriginal Australian heritage adds "a vast, rich cultural tapestry". Booklist noted that the book contained "well-trod territory with familiar themes", but added that the Aboriginal creation stories mixed in brought "much-needed diversity to the genre". Many reviewers also commented on the novel's original storyline and unexpected twists, with Genie in a Book saying it had "a unique twist unlike anything else out there".

== Awards ==
The Interrogation of Ashala Wolf was shortlisted for the Aurealis Awards for best young adult novel and best science fiction novel.

== Sequels ==
In 2013, Kwaymullina published a sequel, The Disappearance of Ember Crow. The final book in the series, The Foretelling of Georgie Spider, was published in 2015.
