= Natalie Jane Prior =

Australian writer

- Born: November 1963 (age 62); Brisbane, Australia
- Writing career
- Genres: Children's literature, young adult fiction
- Website: www.nataliejaneprior.com

Natalie Jane Prior is an Australian writer of children's literature and young adult fiction.

== Biography ==
Prior was born in 1963 in Brisbane, Australia, where she also currently lives with her husband and daughter. She is best known for her internationally successful children's fantasy series, Lily Quench, which has been published in more than twenty countries. Her first fiction book, The Amazing Adventures of Amabel, was published in 1990. She is also the author of The Minivers series and many other books including the picture book PomPom, illustrated by long-time collaborator, Cheryl Orsini, and three picture books about The Paw, illustrated by Terry Denton. Her most recent book is The Fairy Dancers, also illustrated by Cheryl Orsini. Prior's work has been a finalist at the Children's Book Council of Australia Awards as well as being honoured and named as notable. Her book, Fireworks and Darkness, won the 2003 Davitt Awards for best young-adult novel and Lily Quench and the Lighthouse of Skellig Mor won the 2003 Aurealis Award for best children's short fiction. She has also been nominated for an Aurealis Award on three other occasions for best short fiction, long fiction and young-adult novel.

== Bibliography ==
=== Novels ===
- The Amazing Adventures of Amabel (1990)
- Amabel Abroad (1992)
- Tasha's Witch (1995)
- Yesterday's Heroes (1995)
- West End Shuffle (1996)
- London Calling (1997)
- The Loft (1997)
- Squish (2002)

Lily Quench

- Lily Quench and the Dragon of Ashby (1999)
- Lily Quench and the Black Mountains (2001)
- Lily Quench and the Treasure of Mote Ely (2002)
- Lily Quench and the Lighthouse of Skellig Mor (2003)
- Lily Quench and the Magician's Pyramid (2003)
- Lily Quench and the Hand of Manuelo (2004, aka The Secret of Manuelo in the UK)
- Lily Quench and the Search for King Dragon (2004)
- Lily Quench's Companion and Guide to Dragons and the Art of Quenching (2007)

The Ostermark novels

- Fireworks and Darkness (2002)
- The Star Locket (2006)

The Dolls

- Fashion Follies (2005)
- Susannah's Notebook (2005)
- Horse Fever (2005)
- Kiki's Caravan (2006)

The Minivers

- Minivers on the Run (2008)
- Minivers Fight Back (2009, known as Minivers in Danger in the UK)
- Minivers and the Most Secret Room (2010, known as Minivers and the Secret Room in the UK)
- Minivers Forever (2011)

=== Picture books ===
The Paw (with illustrator Terry Denton)

- The Paw (1993)
- The Paw in Destination: Brazil (1995)
- The Paw in The Purple Diamond (1998)
- The Paw Collection (2007, omnibus of the three books with new b/w artwork)

Other books

- Minnie Pearl and the Undersea Bazaar (2007; illustrator Cheryl Orsini)
- Star (2008; illustrator Anna Pignataro)
- Sun (2008; illustrator Anna Pignataro)
- PomPom (2012; illustrator Cheryl Orsini)
- The Fairy Dancers (2015; illustrator Cheryl Orsini)
- Tales of Mrs Mancini (Forthcoming November 2016; illustrator Cheryl Orsini)
- "Lucy's Book" (2017; Illustrator Cheryl Orsini)

=== Non fiction ===
- Bog Bodies, Mummies and Curious Corpses (1994)
- Mysterious Ruins, Lost Cities and Buried Treasure (1994)
- Dance Crazy: Star Turns from Ballet to Belly Dancing (1995)
- Caves, Graves, and Catacombs: Secrets from Beneath the Earth (1996)
- The Demidenko Diary (1996)
- Cleopatra: Last Queen of Egypt (1998)
- Nero: Evil Emperor of Rome (1998)
- Chewing Gum: How it Fed the Gods, Went into Space and Helped Win the War (2000)
- The Recorder: How it Changed the World, Saved the Universe and Topped the Charts (2000)
- Chocolate: How it Saved a Life, Built a City and Conquered the World (2000)
- The Encyclopedia of Preserved People: Pickled, Frozen, and Mummified Corpses from Around the World (2002)

== Nominations and awards ==
Aurealis Awards

- Best children's long fiction
  - 2002: Nomination: Lily Quench and the Treasure of Mote Ely
- Best children's short fiction
  - 2003: Win: Lily Quench and the Lighthouse of Skellig Mor
  - 2003: Nomination: Lily Quench and the Magicians' Pyramid
- Best young-adult novel
  - 2002: Nomination: Fireworks and Darkness

Children's Book Council of Australia Awards

- Picture Book of the Year
  - 1994: Honour: The Paw
- Eve Pownall Award for Information Books
  - 1995: Nominated: Bog Bodies, Mummies and Curious Corpses

Davitt Awards

- Best young-adult novel
  - 2003: Won: Fireworks and Darkness
