= Fireshadow =

2004 novel by Australian writer Tony Eaton

- Author: Anthony Eaton
- Genre: Novel
- Publisher: University of Queensland Press
- Publication date: 2004
- Pages: 337pp
- ISBN: 978-0-702-23381-4

Fireshadow (2004) is a novel written by Australian writer Anthony Eaton and first published by University of Queensland Press. It is set in two timelines, flashing between them and following a character in each. One timeline is set between 1941 and 1949 and follows a young German man named Erich Peiters. The other timeline follows an Australian boy named Vinnie Santani and is set in the present day.

== Plot ==
Taking place during World War II, Fireshadow follows two seventeen-year-old boys. Erich Pieters joins the German Wehrmacht to fight for Chancellor Adolf Hitler in 1941, and winds up in an Australian prisoner of war camp after fighting in North Africa. Half a century later, Vinnie Santiani flees into the remote Australian bush in an effort to cope with the death of his sister. Despite the fact that they live in different times, the boys' lives intertwine in the novel. A reviewer for Magpies commented that the award-winning book's "language is exceptional throughout ... while the author's insights into the emotional lives of the young people are sensitively conveyed."

The main character is Erich Pieters who is 17 years old. Erich grew up in a small family of a mother, father and younger sister. His father was not around much when he was younger as he was an army officer who worked for Hitler. When the war started, Erich signed up for the army to the disapproval of his mother and sister but not his father. His father was a proud man and Erich took after him. Soon after Erich went to war, he was captured and sent to Australia to a prisoner of war camp. As he developed into a man, he became less proud and his personality developed as he tried to overcome his adversity of adapting to such different surroundings and treatment. As Erich aged he became wiser and more caring for those around him. As shown at the end of the novel, Erich is a gentle caring man who as he says "I may be sick, but my eyesight, hearing and memories are as strong as ever!"

== Publication history ==
After the book's initial print release in 2004, it was reissued by the University of Queensland Press in 2013.

== Awards and honors ==
Awards for Fireshadow
Year	Award	Result	Ref.
2004	Western Australian Premier's Book Award for Young Adult	Winner	
2005	CBCA Book of the Year Award for Older Readers	Honour	
2006	IBBY Australia Ena Noël Award	Winner	
2006	South Australian Literary Award for Children's Literature	Shortlist	
