= Stuck in Fast Forward =

1999 novel by Damien Broderick and Rory Barnes

- Stuck in Fast Forward first edition cover.
- Authors: Damien Broderick; Rory Barnes
- Cover artist: Luke Causby
- Language: English
- Genre: Young adult, science fiction
- Publisher: HarperCollins
- Publication date: 1999
- Publication place: Australia
- Media type: Print (paperback)
- Pages: 227 (first edition)
- ISBN: 0-7322-6562-2

Stuck in Fast Forward, also known as The Hunger of Time in an expanded edition, is a 1999 young adult science fiction novel written by Damien Broderick and Rory Barnes. It follows the story of Donald and his family, who decide to travel forward in time in order to wait out the disaster and destruction that the world has become.

== Background ==
Stuck in Fast Forward was first published in 1999 by HarperCollins in paperback format. In 2003, it was expanded and released in the United States by E-Reads under the title The Hunger of Time. It was a short-list nominee for the 1999 Aurealis Award for best young-adult novel but lost to Dave Luckett's A Dark Victory.

== Reception ==
The Courier-Mail (Brisbane, Australia) praised Stuck in Fast Forward as hilarious and clever and stating it "has enough quirks to appeal to the most curious future time-traveller".
