= Guardian of the Dead =

2010 fantasy novel by Karen Healey

- Author: Karen Healey
- Language: English
- Publisher: Little & Brown
- Publication date: April 12, 2010
- Pages: 352
- ISBN: 978-0-316-04430-1

Guardian of the Dead is a 2010 fantasy novel by New Zealand author Karen Healey. It tells of Ellie Spencer, a teenager, as she investigates a series of murders with supernatural perpetrators, and explores her own magical powers. The book draws heavily on Māori mythology. Healey's characterisation of Ellie was praised by reviewers, but the novel's pacing received some criticism.

== Synopsis ==
The novel follows Ellie Spencer, a 17-year-old student at a boarding school with an interest in Classical studies. Her mundane existence is interrupted by a series of murders. Her friend Mark reveals that he is not human, but a Patupaiarehe (a supernatural being from Māori mythology), and that other members of his race are responsible for the murders. The duo become involved in investigating, and Ellie explores her own supernatural gifts.

== Publication and reception ==
Guardian of the Dead was published in April 2010 by Little & Brown. It was shortlisted for the William C. Morris Award, given for a work by a "first-time author writing for teens" by the American Library Association, but lost to The Freak Observer by Blythe Woolston.

Kirkus highlighted Healey's protagonist, praising Ellie's "funny, occasionally profane and often self-deprecating voice", and described the book as a "fast-paced adventure" with an "unfamiliar [and] frightening" antagonist. Publishers Weekly also praised Ellie's characterisation, calling her a "charismatic heroine", but criticised the pacing, stating there was "too much ground covered and too delayed a reward". According to the review, the main plot was revealed too slow, while the finale felt rushed.

Guardian of the Dead draws heavily on Māori mythology, a usage that Healey later distanced herself from, describing it as an act of cultural appropriation. A scholarly commentary from 2019 stated that the book could also be described as a "respectful celebration of Māori myth within a multicultural New Zealand context". Elements of Māori legend referenced in the book include Patupaiarehe and Hine-nui-te-pō, the goddess of the night.
