= Justine Larbalestier =

Australian author (born 1967)

- Born: 1967 (age 58–59); Sydney, Australia
- Occupation: Writer
- Spouse: Scott Westerfeld (m. 2001)
- Writing career
- Period: 1997–present
- Genre: Young adult fantasy
- Website: justinelarbalestier.com

Justine Larbalestier (/ˌlɑːrbəˈlɛsti.ɛər/ LAR-bə-LEST-ee-air; born 1967 is an Australian writer of young adult fiction best known for her 2009 novel, Liar.

== Personal life ==
Larbalestier was born and raised in Sydney. She now alternates residence between Sydney and New York City.

In 2001 she married the American science fiction writer Scott Westerfeld, whom she met in New York City in 2000.

== Selected works ==
=== YA Novels ===
Magic or Madness trilogy

- Magic or Madness (Penguin, 2005). ISBN 978-1-59514-022-7
- Magic Lessons (Penguin, 2006). ISBN 978-1-59514-124-8
- Magic's Child (Penguin, 2007). ISBN 9781595140647

Other

- How to Ditch Your Fairy (Bloomsbury, 2008). ISBN 978-1-59990-301-9
- Liar (Bloomsbury, 2009). ISBN 978-1-59990-305-7
- Team Human (HarperTeen, 2012), Larbalestier and Sarah Rees Brennan. ISBN 978-0-06-208964-9
- Razorhurst (Allen & Unwin, 2014). ISBN 9781743319437
- My Sister Rosa (Soho Press, 2016). ISBN 9781616956745

=== Books edited ===
- Zombies vs. Unicorns (Margaret K. McElderry Books, 2010), eds. Larbalestier and Holly Black. ISBN 978-1-4169-8-953-0

=== Adult Novels ===
- The Mortons (with Scott Westerfeld) (Penguin Random House, upcoming, 2026)

=== Short fiction ===
- "The Cruel Brother" (2001), Strange Horizons, 22 October
- "Where Did You Sleep Last Night?" (2004) in Agog! Smashing Stories (Agog! Press), ed. Cat Sparks
- "Elegy" (2019) in Foreshadow edited by Emily X R Pan and Nova Ren Sum
- "When I Was White" (2020) in Come On In edited by Adi Alsaid, Inkyard Press

=== Nonfiction ===
- "Ending the Battle of the Sexes? Hermaphroditism in 'Venus Plus X' by Theodore Sturgeon and 'Motherhood, Etc.' by L. Timmel Duchamp", The New York Review of Science Fiction, January 1997, pp. 14–16.
- Opulent Darkness: The Werewolves of Tanith Lee (New Lambton: Nimrod Publications, 1999). ISBN 978-0-909242-52-7 – Babel Handbooks on Fantasy and SF Writers, no. 9 (20 pages)
- The Battle of the Sexes in Science Fiction (Wesleyan University Press, 2002).
- Daughters of Earth: Feminist Science Fiction in the Twentieth Century, edited (Wesleyan, 2006).

== Awards ==
Magic or Madness won the 2007 Andre Norton Award for Young Adult Science Fiction and Fantasy—as the year's best book published in the US according to American speculative fiction writers. Daughters of Earth: Feminist Science Fiction won one of Australia's Ditmar Awards in 2007, the William Atheling Jr. Award for Criticism or Review and the Susan Koppelman Award.

Her works have also been among the runners-up for several annual book awards (whose definitions of the award year may vary).

- The Battle of The Sexes in Science Fiction (2002) was nominated for the Peter McNamara Convenors' Award (one of the Aurealis Awards for Australian publications), for the William J. Atheling Ditmar, and for the Hugo Award for Best Related Work in 2003.
- Magic or Madness (2005) was shortlisted for the 2006 Ethel Turner Award as well as for an Aurealis Award, best Australian YA book, and a Ditmar Award, best Science Fiction or Fantasy novel. It was nominated for the Michigan Library Association Teen Services Division "Thumbs Up Award".
- Magic Lessons (2006) was shortlisted for an Aurealis Award, best Australian YA book, and it was one runner-up for a Locus Award, best YA book—namely, 3rd place in the voting by Locus readers.
- Daughters of Earth (2006) was shortlisted for a BSFA Award.
- Liar (2009) was another 3rd-place runner-up for a Locus Award, best YA book. It was a 2010 recipient of the Davitt Award.
- Razorhurst (2014) was shortlisted for the Ethel Turner Prize for Young People's Literature, New South Wales Premier's Literary Awards 2015, and won the 2014 Aurealis Award for Best Horror Novel.
