= D. M. Cornish =

Australian illustrator and fantasy writer

D.M. Cornish
- Born: 1972 (age 53–54); Adelaide, South Australia
- Occupations: Illustrator, writer
- Writing career
- Genres: Fantasy, picture books

David M. Cornish (born 1972) is an illustrator and fantasy writer from Adelaide, South Australia.

== Biography ==
Cornish studied illustration at the University of South Australia, where in 1993 he began to compile a series of notebooks: over the next ten years he filled 23 journals with his pictures, definitions, ideas and histories of his world, the "Half-Continent".

It was not until 2003 that a chance encounter with a children's publisher gave him an opportunity to develop these ideas further. Learning of his journals, she urged him to write a story from his world. Cornish was sent away with the task of delivering 1,000 words the following week and each week thereafter. Abandoning all other paid work, he spent the next two years propped up with one small advance after another.

== Awards and honours ==
Awards for Cornish's writing
Year	Title	Award	Result	Ref.
2006	Foundling	Aurealis Award for Best Young Adult Novel	Winner	
2007	Foundling	Children's Book Council of Australia Older Readers Book of the Year	Honour	
2008	Lamplighter	Aurealis Award for Best Young Adult Novel	Finalist	
2008	Thorn Castle, Giant’s Lair, Black Crypt, Wizardry Crag	Aurealis Award for Best Children's Fiction	Finalist	
2009	Lamplighter	Andre Norton Award	Finalist	
2014	"The Fuller and the Bogle"	Aurealis Award for Best Young Adult Short Story	Finalist	

== Publications ==
=== As writer ===
==== Monster Blood Tattoo series ====
- Foundling (2006, G.P. Putnam's Sons Books for Young Readers)
- Lamplighter (2008)
- Factotum (2010)
- Tales from the Half-Continent (2014)

=== As illustrator ===
==== Standalone books ====
- Emily and the Dragon, written by Lyn Lee (2005, Scholastic Press)

==== The Sunken Kingdom series ====
Cornish illustrated The Sunken Kingdom series, which was written by Kim Wilkins.

1. Ghost Ship (2006, Random House)
2. Tide Stealers (2006, Random House)
3. Sorcerer of the Waves (2008, Random House)
4. The Star Queen (2008, Random House)
