= Caleb Finn =

Australian social media contributor

- Born: 9 December 1994 (age 31); Frankston, Melbourne, Australia
- Occupation: Social media influencer
- Children: 2

TikTok information
- Page: caleb.finn
- Followers: 15.6m

Caleb Finn (born 9 December 1994) is an Australian entertainer and social media influencer known for his avant-garde, dress-ups, and short horror stories. Finn's popularity on several social media platforms including TikTok, Instagram, YouTube and extensive media coverage has made him a noted online personality. Finn has over 16.5 million followers on his numerous social media channels with 15 million on TikTok alone. Finn is also the most followed Victorian content creator, and the second most followed Australian creator.

== Personal life ==
Finn has a partner named Soup (known on social media as xlilsoup), with whom he shares a young son who they refer to as Finley online, and a newborn daughter who they refer to as Fawn online.

== Social media career ==
After finishing secondary school, Finn worked in education, first at an early-childhood care provider and then at a primary school. Finn commenced as a casual user on TikTok, and eventually started gaining increasing popularity. Finn has described the pressure of having an audience for the first time, particularly that as his subscriber count reached 500,000, students at the school he was working at started to recognise him from his content. At just short of 1 million followers, children from other schools started to arrive at Finn's workplace, and this caused the principal to approach Finn and ask him to resign from his employment due to the horror themes in his content and the unwanted attention his creations caused. At this point, Finn made the transition from teaching to fulltime work on his social media channels.
