= Victoria Keon-Cohen =

Australian fashion model and activist

- Born: 1989 (age 36–37)
- Other name: Victoria Boston
- Occupation: fashion model
- Notable work: spokesperson for models' rights
- Father: Bryan Keon-Cohen
- Relatives: Emily Keon-Cohen (sister)

Victoria Keon-Cohen (born 1989) is an Australian fashion model and activist.

== Modelling career ==
Keon-Cohen started her modelling career at 15 in Australia upon winning the Girlfriend magazine model search competition in 2002 (under the stage name Victoria Boston). She has walked the runway for designers such as Chanel, Vogue, Dior, Replay and Armani and appeared in advertising for brands including Levis, David Jones.

== Education ==
Keon-Cohen was educated at Lauriston Girls' School in Melbourne, Australia class of 2003.

== Activism ==
In December 2007, Keon-Cohen approached Actors Equity in the UK to represent models for Union protection. Keon-Cohen became a spokesperson for models' rights on behalf of Equity. She was the founding chair of the Equity Models' Committee from 2007 to 2012. The Guardian named her in the top 30 names to watch as a new radical and Marie Claire magazine described her work as a "pioneering campaign". Working with Equity, the Model Programme was formed, an alliance between the British Fashion Council, Association of Model agencies, the Equity models committee and the Greater London Authority to address the fashion industries health issues and wellbeing of models, including the first Code of Conduct for London Fashion Week. She continues as an active member of the Equity Models Committee and representative in the media. In 2013 Equity announced the first agreement signed with British Vogue.

== Filmography ==
In 2011 Keon-Cohen worked as personal costumer to Robert De Niro on the film Killer Elite. In 2012 she arranged the UK premiere screening of Girl Model, a documentary about the supply chain of young girls from Siberia in to the Japanese modelling market. In 2012 she made her first short film, Eternal Return, also raising awareness of charity Bipolar UK. Victoria's second film titled A Civilized Life was produced by Oscar winning producer Lawrence Bender and features Dean Winters and Britt Lower. She has received multiple awards including Best Director from the California International Film Festival, Official selection at Oscar qualifying Fickerfest in Australia, Phoenix Film Festival, New York City Independent Film Festival and Los Angeles Women's International Film Festival.

== Personal life ==
Victoria is the youngest of three daughters of prominent Australian barrister Bryan Keon-Cohen QC, junior counsel for the plaintiff in Mabo v Queensland (No 2). Her sister Emily Keon-Cohen also worked as an international fashion model. Victoria was romantically linked with Irish actor Jonathan Rhys Meyers in 2012.
