= Ambelin Kwaymullina =

Palyku novelist, illustrator, and assistant professor of law

- Born: 1975 (age 50–51); Perth, Western Australia, Australia
- Education: University of Western Australia (LLB Hons)
- Occupations: Novelist; Illustrator; Academic; Assistant Professor of Law
- Writing career
- Genres: Young adult fiction; Children's literature; Science fiction; Indigenous Futurism
- Notable works: The Interrogation of Ashala Wolf; Tender Morsels; Catching Teller Crow; The Lost Girl
- Notable awards: Victorian Premier's Prize for Writing for Young Adults 2019; CBCA Book of the Year Older Readers – Notable 2019

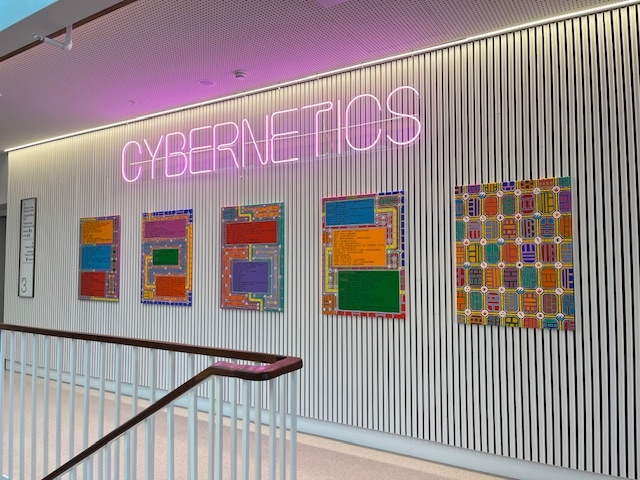
Indigenous Futurisms and AI, Amberlin Kwaymullina, in situ, ANU School of Cybernetics 2024

Ambelin Kwaymullina (born 1975 in Perth, Western Australia) is a Palyku novelist, illustrator, and assistant professor of law at the University of Western Australia.

She was born as the eldest of three children to Sally Morgan, an author and artist, and Paul Morgan, a teacher. She graduated from the University of Western Australia in 1998 with a Bachelor of Laws with honours. Kwaymullina's academic research focuses on both public law, and on Indigenous peoples and the law. Her works of fiction include both young adult science fiction novels and children's picture books. Kwaymullina was a Cybernetic Imagination Resident at Australian National University in 2023-2024, to amplify Indigenous Futurisms.

== Bibliography ==
=== Academic ===
- "Indigenous Holistic Logic: Aspects, Consequences and Applications", (with Blaze Kwaymullina), Journal of Australian Indigenous Issues, Volume 17, Number 2, June 2014.
- "Living Texts: A Perspective on Published Sources", (with Blaze Kwaymullina, B and Lauren Butterly) Indigenous Research Methodologies and Indigenous Worldviews, International Journal of Critical Indigenous Studies, Vol 6, No. 1, 2013.
- "Learning to Read the Signs: Law in an Indigenous Reality", (with Blaze Kwaymullina) Journal of Australian Studies, Vol 34, Issue 2, 2010, pp. 195–208.
- "Solid Rock, Sacred Ground: Cultural Vandalism in the Pilbara", (with Sally Morgan) Australian Feminist Law Journal, Vol 26, 2007.
- "Living Together in Country: Creation, terra nullius and 'the trouble with tradition'", in Young, Simon The Trouble with Tradition: Native Title and Cultural Change, Federation Press, 2007.
- "Bulldozing Stonehenge: Fighting for Cultural Heritage in the Wild Wild West", (with Sally Morgan and Blaze Kwaymullina) in Indigenous Law Bulletin, Vol. 6, Issue 20, 2006, pp 6–9.
- "Seeing the Light: Aboriginal Law, Learning and Sustainable Living in Country", in Indigenous Law Bulletin, Vol. 6, Issue 11, 2005, pp 13–15.
- "Tradeable Water Rights Implementation in Western Australia", (with R. Banyard) Environmental Law and Planning Journal, Vol. 17, No. 4, 2000.

=== Non-fiction ===
- "Growing up, Grow up, Grown-Ups", Growing Up Aboriginal in Australia, Black Inc, Australia, 2018
- Living on Stolen Land, Magabala Books, Australia, 2020

=== Novels ===
==== The Tribe series ====
- The Interrogation of Ashala Wolf, Walker Books, Australia, 2012. (Shortlisted for Aurealis Award)
- The Disappearance of Ember Crow, Walker Books, Australia, 2013.
- The Foretelling of Georgie Spider, Walker Books, Australia, 2015.

==== Young adult fiction, co-authored with Ezekial Kwaymullina ====
- Catching Teller Crow, Allen & Unwin, 2018. (Winner, 2019 Victorian Premier's Prize for Writing for Young Adults) (2019 CBCA Book of the Year Older Readers - Notable)
- Liar's Test: The Silverleaf Chronicles, Book One, Text Publishing, 2024. (Shortlisted for 2025 Victorian Premier's Prize for Writing for Young Adults and the 2025 Ethel Turner Prize for Young People's Literature, NSW Premier's Literary Awards)

=== Picture books ===
- Crow and the Waterhole, Fremantle: Fremantle Press, 2007.
- Caterpillar and Butterfly, Fremantle: Fremantle Press, 2009.
- How Frogmouth Found Her Home, Fremantle: Fremantle Press, 2010.
- The Two-Hearted Numbat, Fremantle Press, 2012.
- The Lost Girl, Perth: Walker Books, 2014.

=== Artwork ===
- Indigenous Futurisms and AI, Canberra: ANU School of Cybernetics, 2024.
