= Kate Constable =

Australian author

- Born: 1966 (age 59–60); Sandringham, Melbourne, Australia
- Occupation: Author
- Writing career
- Genre: Fantasy fiction Contemporary fiction
- Website: www.kateconstable.com

Kate Constable (born 1966) is an Australian author. Her first novel was The Singer of All Songs, the first in the Chanters of Tremaris trilogy. It was later followed by The Waterless Sea and The Tenth Power.

== Biography ==
Constable was born in Sandringham, Melbourne. When she was six, her family moved to Papua New Guinea for her father's work as a pilot.

She enrolled in an Arts/Law degree at Melbourne University. She finished her degrees in seven years, working part-time in various jobs. She settled into the job that was to become her main source of income for the next thirteen years: phone sales, administration assistant and occasional receptionist at Warner Music.

She started writing after many years at law school and at Warner. In 1993, her first short story, "Graham Remains", was published in the literary magazine Meanjin. In 1996 she won second prize in the annual HQ short story competition.

After her first attempt at a novel, she met and fell in love with the man who is now her husband. She started to write fantasy books, the first of which became known as The Singer of All Songs. In 2001, she and her husband had a baby daughter, and The Singer of All Songs was accepted for publication only a few weeks later.

== Bibliography ==
=== Novels ===
Chanters of Tremaris

- The Singer of All Songs (2002)
- The Waterless Sea (2005)
- The Tenth Power (2006)
- Chanters of Tremaris Trilogy (2009, omnibus of the three novels)

Other novels

- The Taste of Lightning (2007)
- Always Mackenzie (2008, book 4 in the Girlfriend Fiction series)
- Cicada Summer (2009)
- Winter of Grace (2009, book 10 in the Girlfriend Fiction series)
- Dear Swoosie (2010, with Penni Russon, book 17 in the Girlfriend Fiction series)
- Crow Country (2011)
- New Guinea Moon (2013)
- The January Stars (2020)
- Tumbleglass (2023)

=== Short fiction ===
- "Graham Remains" (1993) in Meanjin

== Awards and honors ==
Aurealis Awards

- Best young-adult novel
- 2007 Nomination for The Taste of Lightning
- 2009 Short-listed (Best Children's Long Fiction) for Cicada Summer

The Children's Book Council of Australia Book of the Year Awards

- 2003 Notable Book (Older Readers) for Singer of All Songs
- 2004 Notable Book (Older Readers) for The Waterless Sea
- 2008 Notable Book (Older Readers) for The Taste of Lightning
- 2010 Notable Book (Older Readers) for Winter of Grace
- 2012 Winner: Children's Book of the Year Award: Younger Readers for Crow Country

Other awards

- 2009 joint winner Children's Peace Literature Award for Winter for Grace
- 2021 short-listed Prime Minister's Literary Award for January Stars
