= The White Abacus =

1997 novel by Damien Broderick

- The White Abacus trade paperback edition cover.
- Author: Damien Broderick
- Cover artist: Chris Moore
- Language: English
- Genre: Science fiction
- Publisher: Avon Eos
- Publication date: March 1997
- Publication place: United States
- Media type: Print (Hardback & Paperback)
- Pages: 342 (first edition)
- ISBN: 978-0-380-97476-4

The White Abacus is a 1997 science fiction novel by Damien Broderick. It follows the story of Telmah Lord Cima who travels to Earth from a far-off world and becomes friends with a computer-augmented being called Ratio.

== Background ==
The White Abacus was first published in the United States in March 1997 by Avon Eos in hardback and trade paperback formats. In April 1998 it was republished in mass market paperback format. The White Abacus won the 1997 Aurealis Award for best science fiction novel and the 1998 Ditmar Award for best Australian long fiction.
