= Penni Russon =

Australian writer (born 1974)

- Born: 27 December 1974 (age 51); Tasmania, Australia
- Education: Monash University
- Occupation: freelance editor
- Writing career
- Genres: Children's literature, young adult fiction
- Notable awards: 2018: Winner: The Endsister Children's Peace Literature Award

Penni Russon (born 27 December 1974) is an Australian writer of children's literature and young adult fiction.

== Biography ==
Russon was born in 1974 in Tasmania, Australia. Russon studied children's literature at Monash University and professional writing and editing at RMIT University. She is a freelance editor and originally wrote poems. In 2004, her first novel was published by Random House, entitled Undine. Undine was a finalist in the 2004 Aurealis Award for best young-adult novel but lost to Scott Westerfeld's The Secret Hour. In 2005, she released the sequel to Undine, entitled Breathe, which was published by Random House, and in 2007 she concluded the Undine trilogy with Drift. Breathe received a note of high commendation at the 2005 Aurealis Awards. Russon has written three novels in the Girlfriend Fiction series, one in collaboration with Kate Constable, and in 2007 she released Josie and the Michael Street Kids, which was a finalist for the 2009 Children's Peace Literature Award. In 2020, she completed a PhD in comics as therapy in youth mental health, titled Seeing feeling, feeling seen: a reparative poetics of youth mental health in graphic medicine.

== Bibliography ==
Undine trilogy

- Undine (2004)
- Breathe (2005)
- Drift (2007)

Other novels

- Josie and the Michael Street Kids (2007, part of the Aussie Chomps series)
- Indigo Girls (2008, book 2 in the Girlfriend Fiction series)
- Little Bird (2009, book 13 in the Girlfriend Fiction series)
- Dear Swoosie (2010, with Kate Constable, book 17 in the Girlfriend Fiction series)
- Only Ever Always (2011)
- The Endsister (2018)

== Awards and nominations ==
Aurealis Awards

- Best young-adult novel
  - 2004: Nomination: Undine
- Best children's fiction
  - 2018: Winner: The Endsister

Children's Peace Literature Award

- 2009: Nomination: Josie and the Michael Street Kids
