= The Hand of Glory =

Novel by Sophie Masson

- The Hand of Glory first edition cover
- Author: Sophie Masson
- Cover artist: Danielle Cairis
- Language: English
- Genre: Young adult
- Publisher: Hodder Headline
- Publication date: July 2002
- Publication place: Australia
- Media type: Print (Paperback)
- Pages: 266 pp (first edition)
- ISBN: 0-7336-1443-4

The Hand of Glory is a 2002 young adult novel by Sophie Masson. Set in Melbourne in the mid 19th century, it follows the stories of two young people: Sylvia Hoveden who has come from Britain to search for her brother, and Anje Otsoa who is searching for his parents' killer.

== Background ==
The Hand of Glory was first published in Australia in July 2002 by Hodder Headline in trade paperback format. In 2004 it was published as an audiobook by Bolinda Publishing. The Hand of Glory won the 2002 Aurealis Award for best young-adult novel.
