= Damien Broderick =

Australian writer (1944–2025)

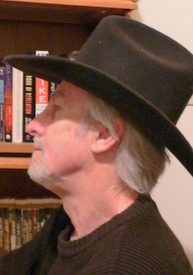
- Born: 22 April 1944; Reservoir, Victoria, Australia
- Died: 19 April 2025 (aged 80); Castelo Branco, Portugal
- Occupations: Writer and editor
- Writing career
- Genres: Science fiction, popular science
- Notable works: The Spike; The Judas Mandala

Damien Francis Broderick (22 April 1944 – 19 April 2025) was an Australian science fiction and popular science writer and editor of some 74 books. The Encyclopedia of Science Fiction credits him with the first usage of the term virtual reality in science fiction, in his 1982 novel The Judas Mandala.

== Background ==
Broderick held a Ph.D. in Literary Studies from Deakin University, Australia, with a dissertation (Frozen Music) comparing the semiotics of scientific, literary, and science fictional textuality. He was for several years a Senior Fellow in the School of Culture and Communication at the University of Melbourne.

He was the founding science fiction editor of the Australian popular science magazine Cosmos from mid-2005 to December 2010.

Broderick lived in San Antonio, Texas, with his wife, tax attorney Barbara Lamar, before they moved to Portugal in 2022. He died in Castelo Branco on 19 April 2025, at the age of 80.

== Career ==
Five of Broderick's books have won Ditmar Awards (including the non-SF Transmitters, which was given a special award); the first, The Dreaming Dragons, was runner-up for the John W. Campbell Memorial Award for Best Science Fiction Novel. He has also won the Aurealis award four times. In November 2003, Broderick was awarded a grant for 2004–05 by the Australia Council to write fiction exploring technological singularity. In 2005 he received the Distinguished Scholarship Award of the International Association for the Fantastic in the Arts. In 2010, he tied for second place in the juried Theodore Sturgeon Award for best sf short story of 2009, and at the World Science Fiction Convention received the A. Bertram Chandler Memorial Award for 2010.

Broderick's best-known works as a futurist and science writer are The Spike (1997; revised 2001), a nonfiction book exploring the future of technology, and in particular the concept of the technological singularity; The Last Mortal Generation (1999) on the prospect of radically extended youthful longevity; and Outside the Gates of Science, on the scientific evidence for some anomalous or paranormal phenomena (2007). A revised and updated edition of The Spike was published in 2001 as The Spike: How Our Lives Are Being Transformed by Rapidly Advancing Technologies.

His critical studies, x, y, z, t: Dimensions of Science Fiction (2004), Ferocious Minds: Polymathy and the New Enlightenment (2005), and Unleashing the Strange (2009) were released by a small US press, Wildside. Several of his books feature cover art by Swedish transhumanist Anders Sandberg, including Earth is but a Star (2001), Broderick's anthology of science fiction stories, and thematically related critical discussions, concerned with the far future. In 2012, with Paul Di Filippo, he published Science Fiction: The 101 Best Novels, 1985–2010, which was short-listed for a 2013 Locus Award.

His most recent novels were the diptych Godplayers (2005) (selected in the annual Recommended Reading List from Locus), and K-Machines (2006) (winner of the 2007 Aurealis Award for year's best SF novel), and, with Rory Barnes, a comic noir crime novel, I'm Dying Here: A Comedy of Bad Manners (2009), first released in very limited numbers as I Suppose a Root's Out of the Question? (2007). With his wife, Barbara Lamar, he wrote the near-future sf thriller Post Mortal Syndrome, serialised online by Cosmos magazine (2007). He edited a book of original essays on the far future, Year Million (2008), which was favorably reviewed by Nature, the Wall Street Journal, etc. In 2010 Climbing Mount Implausible, a collection of mostly early stories, interspersed with memoir commentary, appeared from Borgo/Wildside Books, as did (in 2011) Embarrass My Dog, a collection of mostly early articles on sex, religion, and politics, framed by commentary recalling life in the 1960s and 1970s.

Broderick also wrote radio plays, both adaptations of his own stories (including a 90-minute version of Transmitters) and original works. His commissioned drama Schrödinger's Dog, first broadcast in 1995, was Australia's entry in the Prix Italia; and his novella adaptation of the radio play, published the following year, was selected for Gardner Dozois' Year's Best Science Fiction anthology for that year. His work has been translated into French, German, Dutch, Spanish, Portuguese, Italian, Danish, Polish, Czech, Hungarian, Lithuanian, and Russian.

In 2009, he returned to short fiction, with five stories published in Asimov's magazine, one online at Tor.com, and several others elsewhere. Two of these stories were selected for three 2010 Year's Best anthologies. Another, "Under the Moons of Venus," appeared in five 2011 Year's Best anthologies. The novelette "Walls of Flesh, Bars of Bone", co-written with Broderick's wife Barbara Lamar, appeared in the 2010 anthology Engineering Infinity, edited by Jonathan Strahan. "The Beancounter's Cat" was selected in Gardner Dozois' 2012 Year's Best volume. "This Wind Blowing and this Tide" was reprinted online in Clarkesworld 100 in 2015.

"Quicken", a 2013 commissioned sequel to Grand Master Robert Silverberg's 1974 novella "Born with the Dead", appeared with the original work as Beyond the Doors of Death. This was selected to close Gardner Dozois' 2014 Year's Best Science Fiction and Fantasy anthology. In the same year, a comic fantasy "--And Your Little Dog, Too", written with Rory Barnes, appeared in the short-lived Omni Reboot.

Broderick's first horror fiction, "The Unheimlich Maneuver", opened Luis Ortiz's original anthology The Monkey's Other Paw: Revised Classic Stories of Dread and the Dead (2014).

== Selected bibliography ==
=== Novels and novellas ===
- Sorcerer's World (Signet, 1970)
  - The Black Grail (Avon, 1986) (revised reprint)
- The Dreaming Dragons (Norstilia Press; Penguin Australia; Pocket Books, 1980) – Ditmar Award 1981, runner-up John W. Campbell Memorial Award 1981
  - The Dreaming (Fantastic Books, 2009) (revised reprint)
- The Judas Mandala (Pocket Books, 1982)
  - Mandala (Mandarin, 2002; Fantastic Books, 2009) (revised reprint)
- Valencies (University of Queensland Press, 1983; extended, Borgo/Wildside, 2013) (co-authored with Rory Barnes)
- Transmitters (Ebony Books, 1984) (received special Ditmar Award 1985)
  - Quipu (E-Reads, 2009) (revised reprint)
- Striped Holes (Avon, 1988) (Ditmar Award 1989)
- The Sea's Furthest End (Aphelion, 1993)
- The White Abacus (Avon, 1997) (Ditmar Award 1998, Aurealis award 1998)
- Zones (HarperCollins, 1997) (with Rory Barnes)
- Stuck in Fast Forward (Voyager, 1999) (with Rory Barnes)
  - The Hunger of Time (E-Reads, 2003) (revised reprint)
- The Book of Revelation (Voyager, 1999), also published in the US Dark Gray (Fantastic Books, 2010) (with Rory Barnes)
- Transcension (Tor, 2002) (Aurealis award 2002)
- Yggdrasil Station
  - Godplayers (Thunder's Mouth, 2005) (originally published independently, later collected in 2020 as the first half of Yggsdrasil Station e-book)
  - K-Machines (Thunder's Mouth, 2006) (Aurealis award 2006) (a continuation of the above, collected in 2020 in ebook form as the secondhalf of Yggsdrasil Station)
- Post Mortal Syndrome (2007) (online serialisation, no longer available for download from Cosmos Magazine), first print edition (Wildside, 2011) (with Barbara Lamar)
- I'm Dying Here (Wildside, 2009) (with Rory Barnes)
- Human's Burden (Wildside, 2010) (with Rory Barnes)
- "Quicken" (Arc Manor, 2013, a sequel to the Robert Silverberg novella "Born With the Dead" and published with it as Beyond the Doors of Death)
- The Valley of the God of Our Choice, Inc. (Wildside, 2015) (with Rory Barnes)
- Threshold of Eternity (Arc Manor, 2017) (a rewrite and fix-up by Broderick of two novellas by John Brunner)
- Kingdom of the Worlds (Orion/SF Gateway, 2021) (with John Brunner)

=== Radio and film scripts ===
- Gaia to Galaxy (BearManor Media, 2012)
- Restore Point (BearManor Media, 2012)

=== Children's books ===
- Jack and the Aliens (Word Weavers Press, 2002)
- Jack and the Skyhook (Word Weavers Press, 2003)

=== Short story collections ===
- A Man Returned (Horwitz, Australia, 1965)
- The Dark Between the Stars (Mandarin, Australia, 1991)
- Uncle Bones: Four Science Fiction Novellas (Fantastic Books, 2009) —Introduction by George Zebrowski
- Climbing Mount Implausible: The Evolution of a Science Fiction Writer (Borgo Wildside, 2010) —Foreword by Russell Blackford
- The Qualia Engine: Science Fiction Stories (Fantastic Books, 2011) —Foreword by Mary Robinette Kowal
- Adrift in the Noösphere: Science Fiction Stories (Borgo Wildside, 2012) —Foreword by Rich Horton
- Under the Moons of Venus: Best Science Fiction Stories of Damien Broderick (Ramble House, October 2021) —Introduction by Paul Di Filippo

=== Edited and co-edited science fiction anthologies ===
- The Zeitgeist Machine: A New Anthology of Science Fiction (Angus & Robertson, Australia, 1977)
- Strange Attractors: Original Australian Speculative Fiction (Hale & Iremonger, Australia, 1985)
- Matilda at the Speed of Light: A New Anthology of Australian Science Fiction (Angus & Robertson, Australia, 1988)
- Not the Only Planet: Science Fiction Travel Stories (Lonely Planet, 1998)
- Centaurus: Best of Australian Science Fiction (Tor, 1999)—with David G. Hartwell
- Earth is But a Star: Excursions through Science Fiction to the Far Future (University of Western Australia Press, 2001) Ditmar Award 2002
- The Daymakers: Selected Stories from Science Fantasy (Surinam Turtle Press, 2014)—with John Boston
- You're Not Alone: 30 Science Fiction Stories (Surinam Turtle Press, 2015)
- City of the Tiger: More Selected Stories from Science Fantasy (Surinam Turtle Press, 2015)—with John Boston
- Perchance to Wake: Stories from Science Fantasy, Impulse, and SF Impulse (Surinam Turtle Press, 2016)—with John Boston

=== Edited and co-edited non-fiction anthologies ===
- Year Million: Science at the Far Edge of Knowledge (Atlas, 2008)
- Chained to the Alien: The Best of Australian Science Fiction Review (Second Series) (Wildside/Borgo, 2009)
- Skiffy and Mimesis: More Best of Australian Science Fiction Review (Second Series) (Wildside/Borgo, 2010)
- Warriors of the Tao: Best of Science Fiction, A Review of Speculative Literature —with Van Ikin (Wildside/Borgo, 2011)
- Xeno Fiction: More Best of Science Fiction, A Review of Speculative Literature —with Van Ikin (Wildside/Borgo, 2013)
- Fantastika at the Edge of Reality: Yet More Best of Science Fiction, A Review of Speculative Literature —with Van Ikin (Wildside, 2014)
- Intelligence Unbound: The Future of Uploaded and Artificial Minds —with Russell Blackford (Wiley-Blackwell, 2014)
- Other Spacetimes: Interviews with Speculative Fiction Writers —with Van Ikin (Wildside, 2015)
- Philosophy's Future: The Problem of Philosophical Progress —with Russell Blackford (Wiley-Blackwell, 2017)

=== Non-fiction ===
- Frozen Music: Transcoding literature, science and science fiction (Deakin University PhD dissertation, two volumes, 1989)
- The Architecture of Babel: Discourses of Literature and Science (Melbourne University Press, 1994)
- Reading by Starlight: Postmodern Science Fiction (Routledge, 1995)
- Theory and Its Discontents (Deakin University Press, 1997)
- The Spike: How Our Lives are being Transformed by Rapidly Advancing Technology (Reed, 1997) (revised Forge, 2001)
- The Last Mortal Generation (New Holland, 1999)
- Transrealist Fiction (Greenwood Press, 2000), about Transrealism
- x, y, z, t: Dimensions of Science Fiction (Wildside, 2004)
- Ferocious Minds: Polymathy and the New Enlightenment (Wildside, 2005)
- "Cultural Dominants and Differential MNT Uptake" Essay at Wise Nano
- Unleashing the Strange: Twenty-First Century Science Fiction Literature (Wildside, 2009)
- Climbing Mount Implausible: The Evolution of a Science Fiction Writer (Wildside, 2010)
- Embarrass My Dog: The Way We Were, the Things We Thought (Wildside, 2011)
- Science Fiction: The 101 Best Novels, 1985–2010—with Paul Di Filippo (Nonstop Press, 2012)
- Strange Highways: Reading Science Fantasy—with John Boston (Wildside, 2013)
- Building New Worlds: New Worlds Science Fiction. The Carnell Era, Volume One—with John Boston (Wildside, 2013)
- New Worlds: Before the New Wave. The Carnell Era, Volume Two—with John Boston (Wildside, 2013)
- Starlight Interviews: Conversations with a Science Fiction Writer (Surinam Turtle Press, 2017; corrected edition, 2018)
- Psience Fiction: The Paranormal in Science Fiction Literature (McFarland, 2018)
- Consciousness and Science Fiction (Springer, 2018)
- The Time Machine Hypothesis (Springer, 2019)

==== Parapsychology ====
- The Lotto Effect: Towards a Technology of the Paranormal (Hudson: Hawthorn, 1992)
- Outside the Gates of Science: Why It's Time for the Paranormal to Come In From The Cold (Thunder's Mouth, 2007)
- Evidence for Psi: Thirteen Empirical Research Reports —with Ben Goertzel (McFarland, 2015)
- Knowing the Unknowable (Surinam Turtle Press, 2015)
