= Darklands Trilogy =

Novel series by Australian author Anthony Eaton

- The Covers of each book in the trilogy: Nightpeople, Skyfall, and Daywards respectively.
- Nightpeople; Skyfall; Daywards
- Author: Anthony Eaton
- Cover artist: Greg Bridges
- Country: Australia
- Language: English
- Genre: fantasy action
- Publisher: University of Queensland Press
- Published: 2005 – 2010
- Media type: Print (hardcover and paperback)

The Darklands trilogy is a series of books by Australian author Anthony Eaton. They are published by University of Queensland Press.

== Overview ==
Over a millennia in the future, humanity has polluted Earth to the extent of ruining present day cilivation. The books centre on Saria, a "darklander" living in the wasats (Nightpeople), Larinan Mann of Port City (Skyfall), and Dara, Saria's granddaughter (Daywards), respectively.

== Books ==
- Nightpeople (2005)
- Skyfall (2007)
- Daywards (2010)

== Reception ==
=== Nightpeople ===
Sally Murphy at Aussie Reviews.com called the series "a well-woven, absorbing tale". It was shortlisted in "Best Adult Fantasy" and "Best Young Adult Fantasy" category of the 2006 Aurealis Awards

=== Skyfall ===
Sally Murphy of Aussie Reviews.com commends the book as "challenging and absorbing". She also comments that "The world is alien enough to intrigue, but familiar enough for readers to connect with. The action is fast paced and the characters both diverse and believable". Skyfall was the winner of the 2007 Aurealis Award for "Best Young Adult Fantasy" category. It was also shortlisted for the 2007 Western Australian Premier's Book Awards for "Literature - Young Adult" Category.

=== Daywards ===
The highly anticipated conclusion to the trilogy was received well overall with paper reviews dubbing it "a great read". However this book is yet to either receive, or even be shortlisted for, any awards. Readers found Daywards "the least convincing" of the trilogy but "a fantastic end to a well-received and talked about trilogy".

== The World of the Darklands Trilogy ==
=== Geography ===
In the world of the Darklands Trilogy, the surface of the earth is split into the Darklands, huge walled expanses of land designed to contain environmental and genetic defects. The remainder has virtually no population, with the vast, vast majority of humanity living in the dome cities.

=== The setting ===
==== Towns ====
There were once many towns dotted across the huge expanse of the Darklands, but there are now only a few. This is because some towns got smaller, then some people wanting to escape their failing towns moved to the larger settlements, and then their original towns really did die off. The remaining towns are nothing more than collections of ramshackle huts, made from rusted corrugated tin, and propped up with whatever was available.

==== The Valley ====
The valley, also known as Ma's Valley, was a secret valley far away from all other pockets of civilization, and was known only to a select few. Its only permanent occupant was Ma, an aging woman who took care of children sent to her. Over the years, a number of children were sent there for protection. None were ever found and the valley was never discovered.

==== Ruins of the Shifting House ====
Theis is a decaying structure left over from before the shifting. It is avoided by most Darklanders. It is renowned by most people within the Darklands, for its air of death, destruction and mystery, and because it sits in a circle of ruined, acrid ground. The Shifting House is implied to be a former nuclear power station.

==== Dome Cities ====
These were the pinnacle achievement of generations before; eternal containers of society, made of near impervious permacrete and clearcrete, two materials that revolutionized construction, and along with the invention of the Governors (Massive Computers that controlled every aspect of life within the domes) enabled the building of the Dome Cities. One of the Dome Cities ('Port') is featured on the cover of 'Skyfall'.

==== The Underworld ====
The underworld is made up of fields of decaying skyscrapers and apartment blocks, all abandoned for a thousand years or more.

==== Fliers ====
Flyers are aerial vehicles that are used for travel between the dome cities, as well as research trips into the Darklands. A large variety of fliers exist, although the most famous ones belong to DGAP (Darklands Genetic Adaption Program) and resemble a squat bug. These fliers have three seats (Pilot, Co-Pilot and Commander/Observer) in the cockpit (The Front Dome) arranged in a triangle (Pilot Front-Left, Co-Pilot Front-Right and Commander/Observer Rear-Center), as well as space behind the front dome. This space includes an equipment rack for suits and helmets.
