= Sophie Masson =

Australian author

- Born: 18 May 1959 (age 67); Jakarta, Indonesia
- Occupation: Writer
- Writing career
- Period: 1990–present
- Genres: Short Story, Young Adult, Fantasy, Adult.

Sophie Masson AM is a French-Australian fantasy and children's author.

== Early life and education ==
Sophie Masson was born in Indonesia of French parents who are of mixed ancestry (French, Basque, Spanish and Portuguese). Masson, the third in a family of seven children, came to Australia at the age of five and spent most of the rest of her childhood shuttling back and forth between Australia and France.

== Career ==
Her first two novels, one for adults entitled The House in the Rainforest; the second, for children, called Fire in the Sky, were published in Australia in 1990. Having written forty books, for children, young adults and adults, she is now published in the UK, United States, Thailand, France, Indonesia, Poland, Turkey, China, Korea and Germany as well as Australia. Many of her novels are in the fantasy genre, but she has also written realistic fiction, as well as crime, mystery and romance. She has also had many short stories, essays, articles and reviews published, in books, magazines, newspapers and internet journals.

== Nominations and awards ==
- 2005: Aurealis Award The YA category for The Hand of Glory
- 2011: New South Wales Premier's Literary Awards Patricia Wrightson Prize for Children's Literature for The Hunt for Ned Kelly
- 2019 Australia Day Honours: made Member of the Order of Australia (AM) for "significant service to literature as an author and publisher, and through roles with industry organisations".
- Aurealis Award for Excellence in Speculative Fiction
- 2025: New South Wales Premier's History Awards, Young People's History Prize for Our History: Ben Hall

== Bibliography ==
=== Novels ===
- Masson, Sophie (1990). The house in the rainforest. St. Lucia, Qld., Australia; Portland, Or.: University of Queensland Press; Distributed in the USA and Canada by International Specialized Book Services. ISBN 978-0-7022-2261-0. OCLC 22211182.
- Masson, Sophie (1995). A blaze of summer. Enfield, N.S.W.: Royal Blind Society. OCLC 221407942.
- Sooner or later, South Yarra, Vic.: Louis Braille Books, 1994, ISBN 978-0-7320-1202-1, OCLC 221204866
- Masson, Sophie (1996). The sun is rising. St. Lucia, Qld.; Portland, Ore.: University of Queensland Press; Distributed in the USA and Canada by International Specialized Book Services. ISBN 9780702227899. OCLC 606044086.
- Masson, Sophie (1996). The gifting. London: Moonstone. ISBN 978-0-7322-5180-2. OCLC 422800675.
- Carabas (1996) (US title Serafin)
- The Hoax (1997)
- The Tiger (1998)
- Red City (1998)
- The First Day (2000)
- The Green Prince (2000)
- The Firebird (2001)
- The Hand of Glory (2002)
- The Tempestuous Voyage of Hopewell Shakespeare (2003)
- In Hollow Lands (2004)
- Snow, Fire, Sword (2004)
- Malvolio's Revenge (2005)
- The Madman of Venice (2009)
- The Hunt for Ned Kelly (2010)
- The Phar Lap Mystery (2010)
- My Father's War (2011)
- The Understudy's Revenge (2011)
- The Boggle Hunters (2012)
- Moonlight and Ashes (2012)
- Ned Kelly's Secret (2012)
- Scarlet in the Snow (2013)
- The Crystal Heart (2014)
- Trinity: The False Prince (2015)
- Hunter's Moon (2015)
- Jack of Spades (2017)
- War and Resistance (2019)
- Four On the Run (2020)
- Four All At Sea(2021)
- The Ghost Squad(2021)
- Four Up In Lights (2022)
- A Hundred Words for Butterfly (2022)
- Sydney Under Attack (2022)
- The Key to Rome (2023)
- Our History: Ben Hall (2025)

==== Picture books ====
- Two Trickster Tales from Russia (ill. by David Allan, 2013)
- Two Rainbows (ill. by Michael McMahon, 2017)
- Building Site Zoo (ill. by Laura Wood, 2017)
- Once Upon An ABC (ill. by Christopher Nielsen, 2017)
- See Monkey (ill. by Kathy Creamer, 2018)
- Join the Armidale Parade (ill. by Kathy Creamer, 2019)
- There's A Tiger Out There (ill. by Ruth Waters, 2019)
- On My Way (ill. by Simon Howe, 2019)
- The Snowman's Wish (ill. by Ronak Taher, 2020)
- Santagram (ill. by Shiloh Gordon, 2020)
- A House of Mud (ill. by Katrina Fisher, 2020)
- Cock-a-doodle-doo (ill by Kathy Creamer, 2022)
- Satin (ill. by Lorena Carrington, 2023)

==== Lay Lines series ====
Her Lay Lines trilogy is based on the life and work of the 12th century French poet, Marie de France, and involves love and magic, werewolves and fairy lovers. It evokes the medieval world and world view, notably through the device of the "book within a book".

- Knight by the Pool (1998)
- The Lady of the Flowers (1999)
- Stone of Oakenfast (2000)
- The Forest of Dreams (2001) Omnibus edition

==== StarMaker series ====
Her StarMaker trilogy for young adults is a set of unrelated fairytale fantasies set in an historical context. The books are based on Tattercoats and A Midsummer Night's Dream (Malkin), Sleeping Beauty (Clementine) and Puss in Boots (Serafin).

- Malkin (1998) (also published as Cold Iron)
- Clementine (1999)
- Serafin (1999) (also published as Carabas)

==== Thomas Trew series ====
Her Thomas Trew series for children is set in the Hidden Land, a fantasy world of several realms, each dominated by a particular type of mythical being: Middler Land, a mixed collection of magic-using villagers including pixies and werefoxes; Pandemonium, the realm of the brutish Uncouthers; Arkadia, populated by beings from Greek mythology; Montaynard country, land of dwarves and trolls; Oceanopolis, where selkies and mermaids live; Seraphimia in the sky, home of the winged ariels; and the Island of Ghosts, ruled by Mister D, the lord of death.

The series was published by Hodder & Stoughton between 2006 and 2008. There are six titles, all illustrated by Ted Dewan.

- Thomas Trew and the Hidden People (2006)
- Thomas Trew and the Horns of Pan (2007)
- Thomas Trew and the Klint-King's Gold (2007)
- Thomas Trew and the Selkie's Curse (2007)
- Thomas Trew and the Flying Huntsman (2007)
- Thomas Trew and the Island of Ghosts (2008)

=== Short stories ===
- Masson, Sophie, Carrington, Lorena, (2023) Secrets of the Good Fairy House (Pardalote Press)
- Masson, Sophie, Carrington, Lorena (2022) Magical Tales from French Camelot (Serenity Press)
- Masson, Sophie, Carrington, Lorena, (2022) Bird's Eye View (Pardalote Press)
- Masson, Sophie; Carrington, Lorena (2020). French fairy tales. Australia: Serenity Press. ISBN 978-0-6487624-4-7. OCLC 1257752059.

=== Non-fiction ===
- "Chain reaction : anti-French hysteria in Australia". Quadrant. 39 (12): 26–29. December 1995.
- "Artichoke fields". First Person. Quadrant. 40 (1–2): 22–24. January–February 1996.
- "Angels, faeries and aliens". Culture. Quadrant. 40 (3): 54–58. March 1996.
- Life, Literature, Legends: Collected Essays 1996–2011 (2011)
