= Leviathan (TV series) =

Japanese anime television series

- Promotional poster featuring protagonists Deryn Sharp (foreground) and Aleksandar von Hohenberg (back)

リヴァイアサン (Rivaiasan)
- Genre: Steampunk
- Created by: Scott Westerfeld
- Original net animation
- Directed by: Christophe Ferreira
- Produced by: Katrina Minett; Yoshihiro Watanabe
- Written by: Yuichiro Kido; Yukata Yasunaga
- Music by: Nobuko Toda; Kazuma Jinnouchi
- Studio: Qubic Pictures; Orange
- Licensed by: Netflix
- Released: July 10, 2025
- Runtime: 22–29 minutes
- Episodes: 12

Leviathan (Japanese: リヴァイアサン, Hepburn: Rivaiasan) is a Japanese original net animated (ONA) series directed by Christophe Ferreira and produced by Qubic Pictures and Orange. Based on the novel of the same name by Scott Westerfeld, it premiered globally on Netflix on July 10, 2025.

== Background and premise ==
The English-language novel Leviathan was published in 2009 by American author Scott Westerfeld, followed by Behemoth in 2010 and Goliath in 2011. The series adapts each book in the trilogy as a four-episode arc.

The series follows an alternate history of the First World War with science fiction, steampunk, and dieselpunk elements. The protagonists are Deryn Sharp, who crossdresses as Dylan Sharp to join the British Air Navy aboard the genetically engineered HMA Leviathan, and Prince Aleksandar, who flees the Austro-Hungarian Empire in a mechanized walker after the assassination of his father, Archduke Franz Ferdinand.

== Characters ==
Deryn/Dylan Sharp (ディラン・シャープ, Diran Shāpu)
Voiced by: Natsumi Fujiwara (Japanese); Broghanne Jessamine (English)
Aleksandar von Hohenberg (アレクサンダル・フォン・ホーエンブルク, Arekusandaru fon Hōenberuku)
Voiced by: Ayumu Murase (Japanese); Dor Gvirtsman (English)
Count Volger (ヴォルガー伯爵, Vorugā-hakushaku)
Voiced by: Shunsuke Sakuya (Japanese); Rob Nagle (English)
Klopp (クロップ, Kuroppu)
Voiced by: Yasuhiro Mamiya (Japanese); Gregory Cupoli (English)
Dr. Nora Barlow (ノーラ・バーロウ, Nōra Bārō)
Voiced by: Mie Sonozaki (Japanese); Michelle Lukes (English)
Newkirk (ニューカーク, Nyūkāku)
Voiced by: Ivan Shibata (Japanese); Knox Collier (English)
Lilit (リリット, Riritto)
Voiced by: Fairouz Ai (Japanese); Ren Holly Liu (English)
Nikola Tesla (ニコラ・テスラ, Nikora Tesura)
Voiced by: Hiroki Touchi (Japanese); Christopher Jones (English)
Nene (ネネ)
Voiced by: Ikuko Tani (Japanese); Deborah Geffner (English)
Hoffman (ホフマン, Hofuman)
Voiced by: Genta Nakamura (Japanese); Jacob Nichols (English)
Rigby (リグビー, Rigubī)
Voiced by: Daichi Hayashi (Japanese); Matthew Crowley (English)
Matthews (マシューズ, Mashūzu)
Voiced by: Satoshi Niwa (Japanese); Piers Stubbs (English)
Thomas (トーマス, Tōmasu)
Voiced by: Naoto Kobayashi (Japanese); Jason Anthony (English)
Hirst (ハースト, Hāsuto)
Voiced by: Yukitaro Namura (Japanese); Connor Keene (English)
George Darwin (ジョージ・ダーウィン, Jōji Dāwin)
Voiced by: Michio Hazama (Japanese); John P. Mawson (English)
Pavel (パベル, Paberu)
Voiced by: Takahiro Fujiwara (Japanese); Caleb Hafen (English)
Zaven (ザブン, Zabun)
Voiced by: Naomi Kusumi (Japanese); Michael Benyaer (English)
Sultan (スルタン, Surutan)
Voiced by: Tessyo Genda (Japanese); Marcelo Tubert (English)

== Production ==
An original net animation adaptation of Leviathan by Scott Westerfeld was announced in June 2024. It is directed by Christophe Ferreira and produced by Qubic Pictures and Orange, with Nobuko Toda and Kazuma Jinnouchi composing the music. A teaser trailer was released in September 2024. The opening theme song is "Paths Combine" by Joe Hisaishi, and its closing theme "The Sky Ahead" is performed by Hisaishi featuring Diana Garnet.

== Episodes ==
No.	Title	Directed by	Written by	Original release date
1	"Into the Storm"; Transliteration: "Arashi no naka e" (Japanese: 嵐の中へ)	Christophe Ferreira	Yuichiro Kido	July 10, 2025
2	"Prelude to War"; Transliteration: "Senran no Pureryūdo" (Japanese: 戦乱のプレリュード)	Kotaro Tamura	Yuichiro Kido	July 10, 2025
3	"Clankers and Darwinists"; Transliteration: "Kurankā to Dāwinisuto" (Japanese: クランカーとダーウィニスト)	Yoshifumi Sueda	Yuichiro Kido	July 10, 2025
4	"The Weight of the Past"; Transliteration: "Kako no Omomi" (Japanese: 過去の重み)	Chie Yamashiro	Yuichiro Kido	July 10, 2025
5	"Far to the East"; Transliteration: "Haruka Higashi e" (Japanese: 遥か東へ)	Kotaro Tamura	Yuichiro Kido	July 10, 2025
6	"Shadows of Istanbul"; Transliteration: "Isutanbūru no Kage" (Japanese: イスタンブールの影)	Yoshifumi Sueda	Yuichiro Kido	July 10, 2025
7	"Stormy Seas"; Transliteration: "Aranami" (Japanese: 荒波)	Kyohei Ishiguro	Yuichiro Kido	July 10, 2025
8	"Behemoth"; Transliteration: "Behimosu" (Japanese: ベヒモス)	Takashi Noto	Yuichiro Kido	July 10, 2025
9	"Tunguska"; Transliteration: "Tsungūsuka" (Japanese: ツングースカ)	Yoshifumi Sueda	Yukata Yasunaga	July 10, 2025
10	"Truth and Lies"; Transliteration: "Shinjitsu to Uso" (Japanese: 真実と嘘)	Chie Yamashiro	Yukata Yasunaga	July 10, 2025
11	"Goliath"; Transliteration: "Goriate" (Japanese: ゴリアテ)	Chie Yamashiro	Yuichiro Kido	July 10, 2025
12	"Under the Same Sky"; Transliteration: "Onaji Sora no Shita de" (Japanese: 同じ空の下で)	Christophe Ferreira	Yuichiro Kido	July 10, 2025

== Release and reception ==
The series released on July 10, 2025, worldwide on Netflix.

The series received average to positive reviews in the English-speaking world. Praise was widely directed at the worldbuilding, action, themes, and art direction, however Polygon and Ready Steady Cut criticized the young adult tone and underuse of the premise. Gizmodo, calling the anime "imperfect" and criticizing animation that "may occasionally falter", still praised it for rising "above its visual shortcomings".

IGN's Kristen Carey lauded the series as a potential "modern classic", comparing the animation and setting to that of Studio Ghibli. Carey noted the explicitly queer characterization of Sharp towards the latter portion of the series, where they choose to maintain their more masculine identity even after their assigned gender is revealed.

Mir Fantastiki claimed that the adaptation lacks "the craziness that made the book so appealing", however concluded that it was "heartfelt and engaging" and "a largely faithful adaptation".
