= Dimorphism =

Dimorphism or dimorphic may refer to:

== Science ==
- Dimorphic root systems, plant roots with two distinctive forms for two separate functions
- Polymorphism (biology), for the occurrence of two or more different morphs or forms of the same species
  - Sexual dimorphism, a phenotypic difference between males and females of the same species
- Nuclear dimorphism, when a cell's nuclear apparatus is composed of two structurally and functionally differentiated types of nuclei
- Frond dimorphism, differing forms of fern fronds between the sterile and fertile fronds
- Phenotypic dimorphism, switching between two cell-types
  - Dimorphic fungi, fungi which undergo this type of switching
- Dimorphism (geology), the property of some substances to exist in two distinct crystalline forms

== Mathematics ==
- Semilinear map, a homomorphism between modules, paired with the associated homomorphism between the respective base rings

== See also ==
- Polymorphism (disambiguation)
- Monomorphic (disambiguation)
