= Jessica Day =

Jessica Day may refer to:

- Jessica Day (New Girl), the title character in the television sitcom New Girl
- Jessica Day (Midnighters trilogy), a character in the science-fiction fantasy series written by Scott Westerfeld
- Jessica Day George, author
