= Polymorphism =

Polymorphism, polymorphic, polymorph, polymorphous, or polymorphy may refer to:

== Computing ==
- Polymorphism (computer science), the ability in programming to present the same programming interface for differing underlying forms
- Ad hoc polymorphism, applying polymorphic functions to arguments of different types
- Parametric polymorphism, abstracts types, so that multiple can be used with a single implementation
  - Bounded quantification, restricts type parameters to a range of subtypes
- Subtyping, different classes related by some common superclass can be used in place of that superclass
- Row polymorphism, uses structural subtyping to allow polymorphism over records
- Polymorphic code, self-modifying program code designed to defeat anti-virus programs or reverse engineering

== Science ==
=== Biology ===
- Chromosomal polymorphism, a condition where one species contains members with varying chromosome counts or shapes
- Cell polymorphism, variability in size of cells or nuclei
- Gene polymorphism, the existence of more than one allele at a gene's locus within a population
- Lipid polymorphism, the property of amphiphiles that gives rise to various aggregations of lipids
- Polymorphic, a wave pattern seen on an electrocardiogram; see QRS complex
- Polymorphism (biology), the occurrence of more than one form in the same population of a species
- Polymorphism (RLFP), a technique that exploits variations in homologous DNA sequences

=== Other sciences ===
- Crystal polymorphism, the existence of a solid material in two or more crystal structures, known as polymorphs
- Polymorph, a marketing name for polycaprolactone, a type of thermoplastic which fuses at 60 °C

== Fiction ==
- Polymorph, a shapeshifting being in:
  - "Polymorph" (Red Dwarf), third episode of series III of the science fiction sitcom
  - "Emohawk: Polymorph II", fourth episode of series VI of the science fiction sitcom
  - Polymorph (novel), a 1997 cyberpunk novel by Scott Westerfeld
- Polymorph, a magical spell in many fantasy role-playing games that transforms a target into one of many different creatures for a period of time

== See also ==
- Dimorphism (disambiguation)
- Monomorphic (disambiguation)
- Polymorphism in Lepidoptera
- Shapeshifter (disambiguation)
