= The Last Days (Westerfeld novel) =

Novel by Scott Westerfeld

- The Last Days first edition cover
- Author: Scott Westerfeld
- Language: English
- Series: Peeps
- Genre: Young adult Science fiction
- Publisher: Razorbill
- Publication date: September 7, 2006
- Publication place: United States
- Media type: Print (paperback)
- Pages: 286
- ISBN: 1-59514-128-6
- OCLC: 68786628
- Preceded by: Peeps

The Last Days is a 2006 horror novel by Scott Westerfeld and a companion book to Peeps. It takes place in New York, during the end of civilization hinted upon in Peeps.

== Plot summary ==
The narrative focuses around Moz, Zahler, Pearl, Alana Ray and Minerva, in an apocalyptic New York. Odd occurrences are taking place, the sewers are gushing black water, the earth shakes, and people are inexplicably going mad.

In the midst of it all, two friends begin to see their dreams realized. Moz and Zahler have been friends for six years, playing their guitars without any clear direction. They have always dreamed of forming a band, but have never managed to quite get it done. Moz meets Pearl, a mysterious girl with a knack for music, who he teams up with to save a guitar that a crazy woman throws out of her window. When they begin learning more about one another, the image of a band becomes clear. With Pearl at their head, the band begins to recruit new members and take form.

As the band becomes more and more real, new members join. Alana Ray, a skilled drummer and street performer with a mysterious condition that is never quite made clear (although is most likely to be some advanced form of synesthesia), joins them under the condition that Moz pays her. However, Moz keeps this deal secret from Pearl to gain something resembling control over the band.

Alana Ray has the ability to see colored lights, which she considers to be hallucinations at times, and realistic at others. She often mentions that she is able to "see" the music they play. Pearl also convinces Minerva, her long-term friend, to join the band as their lead singer. Minerva was in a band with Pearl previously, but they broke up when Minerva contracted the parasite causing the madness in the city and begins to hate all the people she once loved, and she begins to hate her boyfriend, another member of the band, causing her to break up with him, thus breaking up the band.

Minerva's parents have hired a woman, Luz, who believes in natural means to fight the parasite instead of the artificial means of modern doctors. Minerva uses these traditional methods such as garlic and rosemary to keep off the worst effects of the parasite, taught to her by Luz.

Zahler eventually changes over from his position as lead guitarist to playing the bass, due to the fact he normally plays lower parts regardless and his fingers are suited for the larger instrument. Initially, he is unhappy that Pearl and Moz had devised this plan without his consent. However, he soon grows used to the bass. Meanwhile, Moz and Minerva begin to date in secret, causing the parasite to be passed on from Minerva to Moz.

The band soon receives a recording contract with Astor Michaels, a man who is a carrier, who is known for having discovered a new type of music called "New Sound". He has been searching for a new type of music which involves a member of the band being infected, creating quite a unique effect. Because of Minerva, and soon the newly infected Moz, Astor Michaels soon believes he has discovered the perfect band. The five are still struggling to agree on a name for their band, but otherwise their band seems to be making its way quickly to fame.

Moz begins playing in the subway to help raise money for the band, until things turn strange one night. A giant worm lurks in the nearby tunnels, and Moz is instinctively drawn to it, all of his instincts screaming to kill it. Before he gets the chance to attack it, the "Angels" - seemingly defenders of the city against the people who have lost their minds - jump down to fight the worm. They soon reveal themselves to actually be carriers of the parasite from the New Watch (featured in Peeps), including Cal and Lace from Peeps. They attempt to bring Moz to New Jersey to treat his parasite, but he runs away, fearing letting down the band by missing their first gig.

The band plays for its first time in a club at night, but it does not go perfectly as planned. Zahler freezes up in the beginning, although he eventually overcomes his stage fright and starts the song. But Minerva's song causes another giant worm to break through the ground, killing many people in the process. The New Watch comes to defeat the worm, and rounds up the whole band to take them to the New Jersey lab, but not before Moz smashes his beloved guitar because of the parasite.

Moz receives treatment for the parasite in New Jersey, and when he has almost completely recovered, he and the rest of the band members visit the Shrink, a character included in Peeps. The Shrink believes that Minerva's singing has called up the worm, and that she can use this ability to help defeat them. Even the Nightmayor, centuries old, can barely remember this ancient talent as it was used in the previous resurfacing of the worms. None of the previous bands employed by Astor Michaels were able to achieve this same result because one member was infected, but not the lead singer. The New Watch recruits the band to sing to cause the worms to surface all around the country, thus allowing the New Watch to fight them on their own terms.

The band goes on tour, travelling wherever they are needed, and Pearl finally comes up with the perfect name for the band: The Last Days. They become heroes of sorts, and finally achieve their dreams of fame, although not in the way that they originally planned. In the end, the worm attacks have ended, and civilization is rebuilding itself. Moz and Minerva are revealed to still be together, although they have broken up and gotten back together numerous times. Pearl has become a politician and is running for mayor of New York "again", leaving the fate of the rest of the characters unknown.

== Characters ==
The novel has several narrators, all of which are members of the band formed by Moz and Pearl. The book was originally only from one character's perspective, but was switched so the perspective was shared between the characters. This method is used to show different story lines existing simultaneously, and reactions of different characters to events that have transpired among the others.

=== Moz ===
Moz is bitter, pessimistic and witty about life. He is described as 'small', thus his nickname comes from 'mosquito'. He plays lead guitar in the band. Good friends with Zahler, Moz is oblivious to Pearl's romantic advances, and is interested in Minerva. His involvement with Minerva leads him to contract the parasite Minerva is infected with, but treatment allows him to escape the worst of its effects.

=== Zahler ===
Moz's good friend, the two had played guitar together for years before meeting Pearl and forming a real band. Zahler was originally playing the lead guitar alongside Moz, but eventually learns to play the bass guitar, as he is much more well suited for this position. He is very skittish, and characterized by the other narrators as being slow-witted.

=== Pearl ===
The band's keyboardist, manager, music synthesizer and founder, Pearl's meeting with Moz essentially set the events in motion that would form the band. Pearl is shown as being wealthy, attending a private school, living in a large apartment with several floors and having a mother who frequently attends social events. She has romantic feelings for Moz, who does not notice her advances. At the end of the novel, Moz reveals that, in the future, Pearl runs for mayor of New York "again".

=== Minerva ===
Pearl's friend from musical school, Minerva (often called simply Min) has a strange disease, revealed in Peeps to be a parasite. She is lead singer of the band and has a fateful affair with Moz.

Scott Westerfeld has described Minerva as another in his long line of 'sexy but crazy' girls he writes about, much like Melissa from Midnighters.

=== Alana Ray Jones ===
The drummer of the band, Alana Ray is the only character whose surname is provided. However, it is strongly implied that this is not her original name, considering her history in a special needs school that left her oddly tainted from a possibly negative experience. It is likewise stated that she needs to take medication. Although her exact condition is never stated, it is implied to be a type of Autism. The band discovered her playing the drums on paint buckets in Times Square, and Moz paid her for a time before they signed contracts with recording companies and had pays of their own.

=== Astor Michael ===
Astor Michaels is a carrier of the parasite and a talent scout for a recording company. He signs Moz and Pearl's band, and is known for discovering the "New Sound". Astor Michaels searches for a new band with the sound of one member with the parasite. When he finds Minerva as lead singer, he finds that this will be much more powerful than another member with the parasite, as these bands have all failed. He stumbles upon the secret to destroying the worms, although when questioned by the New Watch, he knows nothing of the ancient singers that helped defeat the worms originally.

=== Cal Thompson ===
Featured as the main character of Peeps, Cal is included in the second novel in brief appearances later in the novel, continuing his duty that began in Peeps.

=== Lacey ===
Lacey, referred to simply as Lace for the best part of the novel and its predecessor, makes brief appearances alongside Cal.

=== The Nightmayor ===
The Nightmayor (a pun on the word nightmare), who was only alluded to in Peeps, has short introductions to all parts of the book, describing historical events from a unique perspective.
