= Specials (novel) =

2006 novel by Scott Westerfeld

- Author: Scott Westerfeld
- Language: English
- Genre: Young adult science fiction/fantasy
- Publisher: Simon & Schuster
- Publication date: March 2006
- Publication place: United States
- Media type: Print (Hardcover)
- Pages: 372
- ISBN: 1-4169-4795-7
- OCLC: 68043561
- Preceded by: Pretties
- Followed by: Extras

Specials is the third novel in the Uglies series of novels, written by the American author Scott Westerfeld. It continues the story of the protagonist, Tally Youngblood.

== Plot summary ==
The third novel in the Uglies series begins two months after events in Pretties in which Tally Youngblood has become a member of an elite group of "Specials," surgically enhanced super-humans, called the Cutters, who were founded by Shay. She invented the use of ritual self-harm to become "bubbly" and clear-headed in spite of brain lesions used to make her pretty-minded. All of the specials in the group have gotten rid of the brain lesions on their own and now live in the wild. They were adopted into Special Circumstances and given enhanced senses, strength, and reflexes and are among the youngest agents working for Dr. Cable.

The Cutters disguise themselves as Uglies to crash a party in Uglyville and search for members of the New Smoke. Tally successfully finds a girl giving out pills that cure the pretty lesions, which she encourages the Uglies to take to the Crims: Tally and Shay's old clique. The Cutters attempt to capture the girl, but she escapes on a hoverboard with David's help. Giving chase, the Cutters are ambushed by Smokies with unusually advanced technology, including infrared masking sneak suits and electrical weapons. The Smokies kidnap Fausto, one of the Cutters, and leave Shay and Tally injured.

Hearing that the pills are intended for Zane, Tally insists on going to see her boyfriend, who suffered brain damage in New Pretty Town and has been hospitalized since Tally became Special. Tally discovers that while Zane is free of the pretty lesions, his brain has been damaged, and his physical infirmity now disgusts her.

She begins to wonder if she received a brain operation when she was made Special that has given her feelings of superiority.

Eager to show Dr. Cable that Zane is cured so that he will be made Special, Shay and Tally break into the Armory to steal something so that they can cut off Zane's tracking necklace. They succeed but accidentally destroy much of the Armory and put the city on high alert. They begin secretly tracking Zane and the Crims as they journey to the New Smoke, although both split up when Tally receives a guide to the New Smoke from her friend Andrew Simpson Smith, an escapee villager from a reservation of primitive culture. Shay follows the guide straight to the Smoke, but Tally insists on staying with Zane.

During the journey, Zane notices Tally and confronts her about her reasons for following him. The pair kiss, but Tally is still repulsed by Zane's tremors and runs away from him. Tally continues to follow the group to the New Smoke, a city called Diego, which accepts runaways freely. It widely adopts the Pretty cure, rejects the rules about surgery, and allows anyone to look how they please rather than follow the international standard. Tally is amazed by that but is horrified to hear that Diego is beginning to expand into the wild by clear-cutting forest like the Rusties.

Tally finds Fausto at a party for newly arrived runaways but realizes his Special brain surgery has been cured. He had given informed consent before he became special to take a "cure" for having a special brain. Tally barely escapes being forcibly injected. Her escape attempt leaves her helpless, as she jumps off a cliff with only crash bracelets to catch her fall. She is picked up by Diego's authorities and locked up for her lethal strength and weapon-sharp teeth and fingernails, which they insist on removing. The doctors inform her that she has received brain surgery to give her flashes of anger and euphoria, along with feelings of superiority, although they will not change that without her consent. With Shay's help, Tally escapes just before the surgery begins.

Shay and the other Cutters have all been cured by Fausto, but they want Tally's help to protect Diego from imminent attack by Dr. Cable, who blames the so-called New System for the attack on the Armory. Tally assists in the evacuation of the hospital, but learns after the attack that Zane, having just received surgery to cure his tremors, died of complications during the confusion of the attack. Grief-stricken, Tally leaves immediately to tell Dr. Cable the truth about the attack on the Armory. Just before she reaches the city, she meets David, who took a helicopter to talk to her in time. He tells her that he still believes she can think her own way out of her brain surgery but gives her an injector full of the cure so that she has the option of curing herself.

Arriving at Special Circumstances headquarters, Tally finds that Dr. Cable and the Specials have taken control of the city. Dr. Cable knows that Tally was responsible for the attack but has chosen to use the attack as a way to seize control over both this city and Diego. Tally tricks Dr. Cable into stabbing herself with the injector and is imprisoned underground for a month. Tally watches the feeds as Dr. Cable slowly loses her grip on the city, and the cure begins to spread. Diego publishes scans of Tally's Special body and calls her a "morphological violation," and the world is outraged by Dr. Cable's "secret" experiments on unconsenting teenagers.

Eventually, Tally is taken as the last remaining Special to be "despecialized" but resists the surgeons and breaks out with Dr. Cable's help. She becomes the only true Special left. She returns to David, still waiting at the Rusty Ruins, and realizes that her other friends have all found their places in the New System. She decides that she wishes to remain in the wild, free from surgery, and with David will form the "New Special Circumstances" to ensure that nature is protected from humanity's excesses.

== See also ==
- Dystopian fiction
- Uglies
- Pretties
