= Monomorphic =

Monomorphic or Monomorphism may refer to:

- Monomorphism, an injective homomorphism in mathematics
- Monomorphic QRS complex, a wave pattern seen on an electrocardiogram
- Monomorphic, a linguistic term meaning "consisting of only one morpheme"
- Monomorphic phenotype, when only one phenotype exists in a population of a species

- Sexual monomorphism, when both biological sexes are phenotypically indistinguishable from each other.

- Monomorphism (computer science), a programming concept

== See also ==
- Dimorphism (disambiguation)
- Polymorphism (disambiguation)
