= Evolution's Darling =

2000 novel by Scott Westerfeld

- Author: Scott Westerfeld
- Language: English
- Genre: Science fiction
- Publisher: Running Press
- Publication date: 2000
- Publication place: United States
- Media type: Print (Paperback)
- Pages: 352
- ISBN: 978-1-56858-149-1

Evolution's Darling is a science fiction novel by Scott Westerfeld.

== Awards ==
Evolution's Darling was a New York Times Notable Book (2000), and won a Special Citation for the 2000 Philip K. Dick Award.

== Reviews ==
- Adrienne Martini (July 12, 2000). "Evolution's Darling". Baltimore City Paper.
- Claude Lalumière (March 2000). "Gender Questions". January Magazine.
