= So Yesterday (novel) =

Novel by Scott Westerfeld

- Author: Scott Westerfeld
- Language: English
- Genre: Young adult
- Publisher: Penguin Group
- Publication date: September 9, 2004
- Publication place: United States
- Media type: Print (hardback); Print (paperback)
- Pages: 240 (hardback); 256 (paperback)
- ISBN: 978-1-59514-000-5

So Yesterday is a young adult suspense novel by Scott Westerfeld published in 2004. It has won a Victorian Premier's Award and is also an ALA Best Book for Young Adults. So Yesterday, the author's third publication, is considered his "breakout novel" and has been optioned to be made into a film by one of the producers of Fahrenheit 9/11 and Bowling for Columbine. This novel explores issues surrounding marketing, especially marketing targeted at youth, the Technology adoption life cycle, and culture jamming.

== Synopsis ==
A seventeen-year-old high schooler named Hunter works as a cool hunter, finding and selling new trends to his corporate sponsors. His latest find is Jen, an honest-to-goodness 'Innovator' whom he spots based on her unique shoelaces. Together they are drawn into a mystery when one of Hunter's bosses disappears after she runs a 'cool tasting' for a new brand of shoe. What he finds ends up to be nothing like he had expected.

== Characters ==
- Hunter is a teenage boy who is what is known as a 'cool hunter.' He is paid by corporations to go out on the streets and figure out what is 'cool.'
- Jen is a teenage girl and potential love interest for Hunter. She is what is known as an 'innovator,' meaning she is creative and comes up with new fashion trends.
- Mandy is Hunter's boss. She works for 'the client,' which is a shoe company (presumably Nike) and at the beginning of the novel, she mysteriously goes missing.
- The Bald Man is someone involved with Mandy's disappearance who follows Hunter and Jen.
- NASCAR Man is a mysterious person working with the Bald Man in some sort of conspiracy.
- Mwadi Wickersham is a roller skate enthusiast who is also involved in Mandy's disappearance.
- Futura Garamond is a mysterious man who has been fired from countless jobs and is known for creating text that is unreadable (his name is a combination of two different text fonts).
- Hilary Winston-Smith is also a cool hunter like Hunter. She is a socialite and reluctantly helps Hunter and Jen in their search for Mandy. Hunter tends to refer to her as Hilary Winston-Hyphen-Smith, or simply Hillary Hyphen, to poke fun at her aristocratic tendencies and lifestyle.
- Tina Catalina is a friend of Hunter's who is obsessed with Japanese pop culture. She helps Hunter and Jen solve Mandy's disappearance.
