= Uglies =

2005 novel by Scott Westerfeld

- Uglies, the first book in the series
- Author: Scott Westerfeld
- Cover artist: Russell Gordon and Rodrigo Corral
- Series: Uglies
- Media type: Print (Paperback)
- Pages: 436
- ISBN: 0-689-86538-4
- OCLC: 57686394
- LC Class: PZ7.W5197 Ugl 2013
- Followed by: Pretties

Uglies is a 2005 dystopian science fiction novel by Scott Westerfeld. It is set in a futuristic post-scarcity world in which everyone is considered an "Ugly" until they are then turned "Pretty" by extreme cosmetic surgery when they reach the age of 16. It tells the story of a teenager, Tally Youngblood, who rebels against society's enforced conformity after her friends Shay and David show her the downsides to becoming a "Pretty".

Written for young adults, Uglies deals with themes of change, both emotional and physical. The book is the first installment in what was originally a trilogy, the Uglies series, which also includes the books Pretties, Specials, and a behind the scenes expansion work, Extras. In 2018, four new installments were announced, collectively titled the Impostors Series.

== Plot ==
Three hundred years in the future, the government provides everything, including plastic surgery operations. Everyone on their 16th birthday receives the "Pretty" operation, transforming them into society's standard of beauty. After the operation, new Pretties cross the river that divides the city and lead a new life with no responsibilities or obligations. There are two other operations available: one to transform new Pretties into "Middle-Pretties" (adults with a job; performed at age 25) and another to transform Middle-Pretties into "Crumblies" (late Pretties who live in the suburbs). There are also Life-and-Vitality-extending operations performed on these elders every few decades, though the precise extent (age 120, 150?) is not clarified.

Former cities have decayed after bacteria infected the world's petroleum and made it unstable. The old society, so dependent on oil, fell apart when cars and oil fields exploded, and food could no longer be transported. People who lived before the catastrophe (i. e. ourselves) are called the "Rusties." (This is also a term of contempt.)

Tally Youngblood is almost sixteen. Like every other Ugly, she awaits the operation with great anticipation. Her best friend, Peris, has already had the operation, and motivated by her desire to see him, Tally sneaks across the river to New Pretty Town. There, she meets Shay, another Ugly. They become friends, and Shay teaches Tally how to ride a hoverboard. Shay also mentions rebelling against the operation. At first, Tally ignores the idea, but is forced to deal with it when Shay runs away a few days before their shared sixteenth birthday, leaving behind cryptic directions to her destination, a "renegade settlement" called the Smoke, where city runaways go to escape the operation.

On the day of Tally's operation, she is taken to Special Circumstances, a division that is likened to "gremlins" and "[blamed] when anything weird happens." Dr. Cable, a woman who is described as "a cruel pretty," is the head of Special Circumstances. She gives Tally an ultimatum to help locate Shay and the Smoke or never become a pretty. Tally cooperates, and Dr. Cable gives her a hoverboard and all the needed supplies to survive in the wild, along with a heart locket that contains a tracking device. Once activated with Tally's eye, it will show the location of the Smoke to Special Circumstances. By following Shay's clues, Tally sets off to find her friend.

When Tally arrives at the Smoke, she finds Shay, her friend David, and an entire community of runaway Uglies. She is reluctant to activate the pendant, and it eventually becomes clear that David is in love with her. David takes her to meet his parents, Maddy and Az, who are the original runaways from the city. They explain how the operation does more than "cosmetic nipping and tucking." It also causes lesions in the brain that make the people placid, or "pretty-minded." Horrified, Tally decides to keep the Smoke secret and throws the locket into a fire to destroy it. However, the flames' heat causes the tracker to activate and give away the Smoke's location.

The following morning, Special Circumstances arrive at the camp, and Tally tries to escape. She fails and is caught and taken to a rabbit pen in which other caught Smokies are kept, tied up. Eye scans are taken of all the captured Smokies and identify from which city they fled. Tally is then taken to Dr. Cable, who explains how they found the Smoke. Because of how long it took to activate the pendant, Dr. Cable suspects that Tally betrayed her but activated it by accident. Dr. Cable tests Tally by ordering her to retrieve the locket, which should be intact. Tally escapes on a hoverboard. After a long and stressful chase, she hides in a cave in which they cannot track her heat signature. There, she finds David also hiding, and together, they begin to plan a rescue.

Tally and David return to his house, where they find evidence that Special Circumstances took Maddy and Az. David leads Tally to a secret stash of survival equipment, where they find everything they need and load them onto the four hoverboards stashed there. As Tally and David travel back to the city to free their friends, they fall in love. Arriving at the Special Circumstances complex, they discover that Shay has already been "turned" and is now a Pretty. After meeting Dr. Cable, David knocks her out and takes her work tablet, which contains all the necessary information to reverse the brain lesions created by the Pretty operation. Tally and David then free all the Smokies held in the complex. As they escape the complex, Maddy tells David that his father, Az, is dead.

Once everyone is safe at the Rusty Ruins, Maddy begins working on a cure by using Dr. Cable's tablet. She then offers it to Shay, who refuses and does not want to become a "vegetable." Since Tally feels responsible for her betrayal, she decides to become a Pretty and take the cure as a "willing subject." To convince David to let her go back to the city, she tells him about her involvement with Special Circumstances and searching for the Smoke to betray them. While David is absorbing what Tally admitted, Maddy advises Tally to go back with Shay before she changes her mind. Once there, Tally announces to a Middle Pretty, "I'm Tally Youngblood. Make me pretty," the final phrase of the novel.

== Characters ==
=== Uglies ===
- Tally Youngblood is the main character of the story. She is notably clever and loves tricks. Her Ugly nickname is Squint. As the story progresses, she begins to stray from the rules of her city and her assignment. She falls in love with David at the Smoke. Together, Tally and David rescue the Smokies after the Smoke is captured by Special Circumstances. In the end, she gives herself up to be Pretty and helps Shay.
- Shay is Tally's new friend in Uglyville. She is an Ugly nicknamed Skinny. They meet while Tally is fleeing from New Pretty City. Shay teaches Tally how to hoverboard and more about the outside world and the Rusties. Shay prefers to refer to Tally by her name, but they occasionally call each other by their Ugly nicknames to provoke each other. After a fight, Shay decides to "grow up" and go to the Smoke. Shay grows jealous of Tally's presence in the Smoke, especially of her relationship with David. Shay realizes Tally's ultimate betrayal but no longer cares once she is made Pretty.

=== Smokies ===
- David, the son of the founders of the Smoke, was not born in any city. Shay has an interest in David, but he does not reciprocate her feelings. After Tally arrives at the Smoke, his interest in her makes Shay jealous. David helps change Tally's feeling towards the cities. He wears hand-sewn clothing, which is made from animal skins, and has survival skills that he passes on to Tally.
- Maddy is David's mother. She tells Tally about the brain lesions caused by the Pretty surgery, and later develops a cure for the lesions. She is a founder of the Smoke.
- Az is David's father and dies in an operation. As part of the Pretty Special Committee, he discovered the brain lesions that the Pretty surgery causes and suspects the lesions are intentional. He is a founder of the Smoke.
- Croy is another Smokie. He is originally from Uglyville and knows Shay. He is originally suspicious of Tally but grows to trust her.
- The Boss is a figure called the "Boss" but is not in charge of the leaderless Smoke; however, he is in charge of the library. He was killed when the Specials arrived.

=== Specials ===
- Dr. Cable is the head of Special Circumstances and denies Tally the operation until she finds Shay. She sends Specials to destroy the Smoke. She is described as having an aquiline nose, non-reflective gray eyes, a razor-like voice, and sharp teeth.

=== Pretties ===
- Peris, Tally's best friend, is three months older than Tally and thus has become a Pretty. He helps Tally decide to betray Shay. His Ugly nickname was Nose.
- Ellie Youngblood is Tally's mother who helps Tally decide to turn in Shay. She is a Middle Pretty.
- Sol Youngblood is Tally's father who helps Tally decide to turn in Shay. He is a Middle Pretty.

== Major motifs ==
=== Identity ===
According to critics, Uglies contains themes of identity, particularly regarding teenagers. Phillip Gough said the government of Tally's city, which controls what happens within the operation, "removes responsibility for identity," creating sameness and uniformity. By placing heavy emphasis on the role of individualism, the novel shows the importance of teen's self-concept. Because identity is formed by "displacement," and all citizens are carefully sheltered, there is no chance for them to branch out into independence. "Physical identity is determined by committees," notes Gough in his essay discussing Westerfeld's novel. The lack of choice causes all "markers of physical identity" to be destroyed by their government.

=== Beauty ===
Kristi N. Scott and M. Heather Dragoo note that another recurring theme in the "image-obsessed society" is beauty, and its recurring relationship with individuality. Gough agreed and commented that "when everyone is equal, beauty loses its meaning." Beauty went hand in hand with identity: Uglies were taught to think of their bodies and faces as "temporary," which would be replaced later with cosmetic surgery. A strong line is drawn to connect features with personality, and one critic stated that the characters develop "ugly" and "pretty" personalities with each stage of their operations.

=== Dystopian society ===
A "utopia resting on ruthless suppression of individual freedom" was the Times' Amanda Craig's description of Tally's city. Several critics identified the trend of a controlling government in the novel. People in the protagonist's world are "programmed and designed by the Pretty committee, " with no choice or control in their operation, and identity is placed firmly "in the hands of the state". Dragoo and Scott point out how segregated the city is, with Pretties, Uglies, Middlies, and Crumblies neatly divided into different sections. Many reviewers have commented on the way in which the city manipulates its inhabitants, including the supposedly rebellious "uglies" and the ones who are nothing more than "docile bodies". Besides, the dystopian society depicted by Westerfeld includes a particularly common trope in the genre: the duality of spaces, the metropolis representing the totalitarian civilization and nature as a field for freedom.

=== Humanity ===
Various critics also found a theme of humanity within Uglies. Phillip Gough noted that Pretties and Specials (those who worked for Special Circumstances) are "posthuman" because of their operations. Others, including Scott and Dragoo, argued against this by claiming "the human body provides an artistic and political canvas for intentional manipulation" and that the physical transformation can be an "outlet for humanity." The novel Uglies seems to take no definite stance on it, but clearer points are shown in Pretties and Specials, the following books in the trilogy.

== Background ==
When asked how he came up with the idea of Uglies, Westerfeld said that the inspiration came from an email sent by a friend who had recently moved from New York to Los Angeles who experienced culture shock after an appointment with a local dentist who "asked him to consider getting cosmetic surgery." He is the son of a computer programmer for UNIVAC, which meant that he grew up familiar with the cutting edge of 1960s technology. Amanda Craig said that "it is his prescient perception of how such inventions will lead to absolute loss of privacy which has elicited as much fan-mail as the issue of how looks dominate our lives."

The book shares many themes with the 1964 The Twilight Zone episode "Number 12 Looks Just Like You". The author of the books noted that he saw the episode in his childhood but had forgotten the details.

In the dedication page for Uglies, Westerfeld says: "This novel was shaped by a series of e-mail exchanges between me and Ted Chiang about his story "Liking What You See: A Documentary". His input on the manuscript was also invaluable." In another interview, Westerfeld says that the short story is about a new technology that enables individuals to turn off their ability to see beauty so they can focus on the deeper and more important parts of another individual. In a 2012 interview on Bookyurt, Westerfeld explained that his point in writing the book was not to make a big commentary on the issues with beauty but to make people aware of the culture of retouching that is developing in the world and to be aware of our own ideas about beauty and our need to think for ourselves.

== Reception ==
The novel has received mostly positive reviews. The Baroque Body praised the novel as having "creative slang, unique technical gadgets, and defining characteristics of personhood." Cory Doctorow complimented its "perfect parables of adolescent life" and stated that it is "fine science fiction for youth." Jennifer Mattson claimed it to be "ingenious." Reed Business Information praised the "convincing plot" and noted that it is "highly readable."

However, Publishers Weekly commented that Tally was a "rather passive protagonist," and the Times complained that "Tally herself is a bit too vague as a character." The critic Jennifer Mattson noted that the brisk pace of the novel as being "bad for convincing relationships."

The novel sparked discussion over the use of plastic surgery to improve one's looks. The author said he has "received many letters from girls who have decided against having surgery since reading Uglies, pondering the ethics of changing your body's appearance. Westerfeld has forecast that "having extreme cosmetic surgery will be like buying a $1,000 Gucci bag, an indication that you are a member of the privileged class." While some critics agree, others cite its tremendous benefits to people who genuinely need it. Westerfeld himself "wouldn't hesitate [to use plastic surgery] if he had a kid with port-wine stain. We have all been altering our appearances ever since clothing was invented."

There is also some moderate debate sparked by Uglies over the issue of monitoring people. The state has started to track teens through their cell phones and on occasion through dental implants. Westerfeld feels this will "result in a total loss of privacy," however, others feel that this technology is necessary to "properly supervise" people.

== Adaptations ==
=== Film ===
20th Century Fox and producer John Davis (Eragon) bought the film rights to the novel in 2006. The movie was reportedly supposed to be released in 2011, but was delayed multiple times and ultimately entered development hell.

In September 2020, it was announced that Netflix had acquired the rights for a film based on the novel. Joey King, who had previously worked with Netflix on The Kissing Booth, served as the movie's executive producer in addition to the lead actress, where she portrayed the protagonist, Tally Youngblood. American filmmaker McG served as its director.

Upon its release on September 13, 2024, the film was panned by critics; review aggregator Rotten Tomatoes listed 15% of 46 available reviews as positive, while Metacritic, which uses a weighted average, assigned it a score of 34 out of 100, indicating “generally unfavorable” reception.

=== Graphic novel ===
Steven Cummings illustrated Uglies in a manga-style graphic novel written by Westerfeld and Devin K. Grayson called Shay's Story, which tells the story from Shay's perspective. It was published in a black-and-white 5¾ x 8¼ inches format by Del Rey Manga in 2012.

== Publication history ==
The novel Uglies was first published in 2005, and the photograph was made by photographer Carissa "Car" Pelleteri. It later re-released in 2011 with a new cover. It is the first part of a trilogy, with sequels Pretties, and Specials and the further book Extras. The trilogy featured on the New York Times bestseller list for a significant amount of time. There has also been an audio recording made of the book that was published in 2006 and made available on both CD and cassette.

== Bibliography ==
- Westerfeld, Scott (2005). Uglies. Uglies Tetralogy. Vol. one (two ed.). New York: Simon Pulse. pp. 406. ISBN 978-1-4424-1981-0.
