= Uglies (novel series) =

Novel series by Scott Westerfeld

- Uglies; Pretties; Specials; Extras
- Author: Scott Westerfeld
- Language: English
- Genre: Young adult, Science fiction, Fantasy
- Publisher: Simon Pulse
- Published: 2005–2007
- Media type: softcover/hardcover

Uglies is a young adult book series by Scott Westerfeld, set in a post-apocalyptic future where the government strictly controls their citizens by separating society into Uglies, young people who haven't turned sixteen yet, and Pretties, who have an operation to become when they're sixteen and every few decades thereafter.

Westerfeld originally intended for Uglies to be a trilogy, with the novels Uglies, Pretties, and Specials. However, he ultimately wrote an additional book, Extras. This fourth book is dedicated to "everyone who wrote to me to reveal the secret definition of the word 'trilogy'."

On February 2, 2018, Westerfeld announced a continuation of the series consisting of four new novels, starting with Impostors which was released in September of that year.

== Plot summary ==
The original trilogy of 'Uglies', 'Pretties', and 'Specials' focus on the exploits of Tally Youngblood.

Tally lives in a post-apocalyptic future where people long ago destroyed the world in their excess, and most of humanity died out. The people who remain live in concentrated cities that have strictly defined population limits. In those cities, all of society has developed to be built around "Pretties", people who have had a surgery to mold them into a 'perfect' person: inhumanly beautiful, which allows them to continue their life in privilege. The government mandates that everyone has this surgery on their sixteenth birthday.

In the first novel, Tally is still 'Ugly', as is everyone between twelve and sixteen, and eagerly awaiting her Pretty transformation. Her new friend Shay runs away to the Smoke, a secret refuge for those who oppose the system. Tally is contacted by Dr. Cable, the head of the mysterious Special Circumstances arm of the government. Dr. Cable cuts Tally a deal: betray her friends and help the city locate the runaways or remain an "Ugly" forever. When Tally joins the Smokies, she learns a chilling truth: the Pretty transformation surgery changes everyone's brain, making them shallow, unintelligent, and ultimately easier to control.

Over the course of the series, Tally struggles to maintain her sense of self within a society that is constantly trying to shape her into something it can use.

Ultimately, Tally succeeds in defining her own identity, and opts to abandon society altogether in favour of protecting the wilderness from the expansion of humanity if it grows too quickly and risks re-damaging the world.

The fourth novel centers on Aya Fuse, a girl struggling to find her place in the chaotic world after Tally frees people to think for themselves.

== Setting ==
In humanity's future, a new type of society has been formed after a disastrous oil-bug was released upon the planet that killed 98% of the human population and left many cities in ruins. The new society is composed of about one hundred small post-scarcity, independently run city states, spread out across the seven continents, which now have different coastlines as a result of global warming. Tally's city is located somewhere in Washington state, west of the Cascade Mountains. A name is never given to Tally's city. It is north-east of Diego, presumed to be San Diego, and east of The Rusty Ruins which were once Seattle, Washington.

The new society holds three values at its core: Sustainability, Peace, and Equality. The new society promotes these values through the use of The Surge, a type of extreme cosmetic surgery that all citizens undergo at the age of 16. The Surge transforms ordinary teenagers, or "Uglies", into paragons of beauty. In addition, a secret part of the surgery exists: artificial lesions are placed on people's brains, to make them more docile, slower-thinking, and ultimately easier to control. Though the most important operation, it is only the first of many. Within the post-Surge part of a person's life, everyone's common beauty inspires peace and equality among the citizens.

"New Pretties", teenagers who have recently had the operation, are given access to life in New Pretty Town, the innermost part of the city where food, shelter, and entertainment are provided by the government free of charge.

When a New Pretty reaches a certain age (25 or so), they are given the surgery that transforms them into "Middle Pretties". This surgery is entirely cosmetic and performed in an afternoon; unless the pretty is entering a job which requires creativity and quick-thinking, in which case some lesions are removed. The second operation gives the Pretty light crows feet and a few grey hairs, which inspire trust and convey authority.

There is no official third surgery. However, "late Pretties", also called "crumblies" by their children, often undergo multiple life-extension treatments which allow them to live into their mid two-hundreds comfortably and attractively.

Outside of Pretty society, there is a fourth category of operation that equips people to become 'Specials'. Specials are a secret task force who are chosen to carry out arrests, kidnappings, and assassinations of any citizens who betray the city's governments or break important laws. It is believed that the Specials were created by Dr. Cable to stop humans from expanding into the wild. They are described as frighteningly beautiful, or a "cruel pretty", with features like large coal black eyes and sharp cheekbones. Specials' bodies are heavily altered to have multiple fighting advantages, such as incredible strength, agility, and antenna chips implanted in their spines to allow constant communication with each other.

== Inspiration for the series ==
In a promotional interview prepared by Westerfeld's publisher, Simon & Schuster, he talks about his inspiration for the series, stating: "We are definitely heading toward a world in which lots of people will get to decide how they look… [I] wanted to write a future in which these technologies were fairly common." In the same promotional material, Westerfeld also cites the 2002 short story "Liking What You See: A Documentary", by Ted Chiang, as an inspiration.

Reviews noted the extensive similarities between the plot of the series and that of "Number Twelve Looks Just Like You", a 1964 episode of The Twilight Zone. In a blog posting, Westerfeld noted that he had seen the episode in his childhood, but assures that it was not plagiarism, and was not his inspiration for the series, claiming that he had forgotten all about the television episode by the time he started writing the series.

== Characters ==
=== Tally Youngblood ===
Tally is the protagonist of the books, first appearing in Uglies as a young fifteen year-old girl, waiting for her sixteenth birthday so that she can be turned pretty. Throughout the series, Tally undergoes significant changes physically and mentally from Ugly, to Pretty, to Special, and eventually rewires her brain to become only herself.

=== Shay ===
Shay is Tally's on-and-off best friend throughout the series. They meet when Tally returns from visiting her friend in New Pretty Town. Shay has a secret about 'The Smoke', a remote camp in the woods where citizens can escape the city. She believes Tally can keep her secret and is ultimately betrayed, though by accident. Shay becomes a Pretty, and Tally follows, and once again when she becomes a Special. In the third book, Shay is cured of her Specialness and remains in Diego, a city that does not force The Surge on its people.

=== David ===
David is Tally and Shay's contact from The Smoke. Shay met him when her friends were running away from the city, and David showed them they could live out in the wild. David is the son of Maddy and Az; he was born and raised in the wild, after his parents left Tally's city. He and Shay were in a relationship, but David soon fell in love with Tally while she was in the Smoke, which causes tension between Tally and Shay throughout the first two books. In the end of Specials, he accompanies Tally in creating the new "Special Circumstances" that is set on keeping the Wild safe, and making sure people weren't pushing too far.

=== Croy ===
Croy is one of Shay's friends who moved out to The Smoke. He is suspicious of Tally most of the time, but after she fights against the specials, he trusts her. He brings the cure to Tally at the beginning of Pretties after crashing a party in New Pretty Town.

=== Dr. Cable ===
Dr. Cable is the head of Special Circumstances and the creator of 'Specials'. Dr. Cable is described by Tally as a "cruel pretty", like her creations. At the end of the third book, Cable helps Tally escape because she wished for at least one of them to remain alive.

== Film adaptation ==
In September 2020, a feature film adaptation titled The Uglies was announced to be in development with 20th Century Fox and Joey King signed on to star in the lead role as Tally Youngblood. McG signed on to direct, with Krista Vernoff serving as screenwriter. John Davis, Jordan Davis, Robyn Meisinger, Dan Spilo, McG, and Mary Viola will produce the movie. The project will be a joint-venture production between Davis Entertainment Company, Anonymous Content, Industry Entertainment, Wonderland Sound and Vision, and Netflix Original Films. The film is intended to release through streaming exclusively on Netflix. Later that year, Keith Powers, Brianne Tju, Chase Stokes, and Laverne Cox joined the supporting cast.

In February 2022, King revealed that production had already finished, and had taken place in Atlanta, Georgia in December 2021.

Uglies was released on September 13, 2024 on Netflix. It received negative reviews from most critics.
