= Afterworlds =

2014 novel by Scott Westerfeld

- Afterworlds book cover
- Author: Scott Westerfeld
- Audio read by: Sheetal Sheth; Heather Lind
- Language: English
- Publisher: Simon Pulse
- Publication date: September 23, 2014
- Publication place: United States
- Pages: 599
- ISBN: 978-1481422345
- OCLC: 903329534

Afterworlds is a fiction novel by New York Times bestselling author Scott Westerfeld that was published on September 23, 2014. The slogan for the book is, "Darcy writes the words. Lizzie lives them."

== Plot ==
Darcy Patel has put college and everything else on hold to move to New York to rewrite and publish her teen novel, 'Afterworlds'. Arriving with no apartment or friends she wonders whether she's made the right decision, until she falls in with a crowd of other seasoned and fledgling writers who take her under their wings. Darcy weathers on through the whirlwind that is a first publication and learns multiple lessons not just in YA writing, but also in romance and relationships. Told in alternating chapters is Darcy's novel, a suspenseful thriller about Lizzie, a teen who slips into the Afterworld to survive a terrorist attack. Upon venturing into the underworld, Lizzie meets another mortal afterlife transcender who has been in the Afterworld for thousands of years and attempts to support Lizzie's transition as a psychopomp. But the Afterworld is a place between the living and the dead, and as Lizzie drifts between our world and that of the Afterworld, she discovers that many unsolved - and terrifying - stories need to be reconciled.

== Characters ==
=== Darcy's Story ===
- Darcy Patel - an 18 year old Hindu girl from Philadelphia who writes a novel in 30 days after discovering that her mother's childhood friend had been murdered. Upon gaining a two-book deal for her original manuscript, Darcy defers college for a year to move to New York City to conduct her rewrites and begin her second novel. Darcy is quickly swept up in the world of YA writing as she navigates her newly adult freedom, her career, and even a blossoming romance.
- Imogen Gray - a fellow author with the same publisher as Darcy, Imogen quickly becomes Darcy's main confidant and eventual love interest in the city. Her book is Pyromancer, the first of a trilogy focusing on people with special powers. But there is a secrecy behind Imogen's real identity and inspiration for Pyromancer that Darcy struggles with.
- Nisha Patel - Darcy's 14-year-old sister who is in charge of Darcy's New York budget, even though the budget is largely ignored by Darcy. Nisha is often credited as being wiser than the average 14 year old.
- Annika Patel - Darcy's mother whose own childhood story serves as the inspiration for Afterworlds
- Darcy's father - an engineer who wants Darcy to be a successful career woman
- Carla and Sagan - Darcy's friends from high school who visit her in New York

=== Lizzie's Story ===
- Lizzie Scofield - the protagonist in Darcy's story. After pretending to be dead in order to survive a terrorist attack in an airport, Lizzie finds that she has actually crossed over and now has the ability to communicate with and see ghosts in the real world while also holding the power to transcend into the Afterworld. Mortals who can cross over are referred to as ‘psychopomps’.
- Yamaraj - The first psychopomp to cross over to the Afterworld. He stayed there for thousands of years and even became the protector for numerous souls. Yamaraj begins as a guide for Lizzie as she begins exploring the Afterworld. He is based on a Bollywood actor and stories from the Hindu Vedas; he is often referred to as a ‘Hindu death God’ by Darcy and others in the real world.
- Anna Scofield - Lizzie's mother whose childhood friend was murdered and is based on the story Darcy learns of her own mother.
- Mindy - childhood friend of Anna who was murdered. She has stayed around the Scofield household for the majority of her afterlife journey and forms a friendship with Lizzie.

== Reception ==
The majority of the reviews for Afterworlds are positive and applaud Westerfeld for representing the passion of reading and writing in Darcy. Most reviewers felt that Darcy's story was the stronger of the two. Stephanie Zacharek of the New York Times writes, "the otherworldly story Darcy has invented for Lizzie isn't nearly as compelling as Darcy's real-world one." Tasha Robinson of NPR writes, "while Lizzie's story is briskly thrilling, it's ultimately more valuable as a window into Darcy's mind."
