= Pretties =

2005 novel by Scott Westerfeld

- Author: Scott Westerfeld
- Language: English
- Series: The Uglies Trilogy
- Genre: Young adult novel/Dystopian
- Publisher: Simon Pulse
- Publication date: May 5, 2005
- Publication place: United States
- Media type: Print (Paperback)
- Pages: 370
- ISBN: 0-689-86539-2
- OCLC: 62149214
- LC Class: PZ7.W5197 Pr 2005
- Preceded by: Uglies
- Followed by: Specials

Pretties is a 2005 science fiction novel and the second book of the Uglies Trilogy written by Scott Westerfeld. The novel is set in a future dystopian world in which everyone is turned "Pretty" by extreme cosmetic surgery upon reaching age 16. It tells the story of teenager, Tally Youngblood, who finds that life as a partygoing "Pretty" is not as attractive as she thought. She and her new boyfriend take a pill which wakes them up from their "fog" and forms a risky plan to save others.

== Plot ==
The book begins with Tally, the main protagonist, as a Pretty debating what to wear to a bash. While attending the bash at which she is to be voted into the "Crims" clique, she is followed by someone who appears to be a "Special," a member of Special Circumstances. She soon finds him and discovers that it is Croy, a Smokey she knew before she turned Pretty. He tells her that he left a note for Tally in Valentino Mansion. Real Specials arrive and so he leaves and Tally tries to follow him by jumping off a balcony with Peris, who is wearing a bungee jacket. They bounce, but Tally is hit in the head hard enough to make her bleed and is voted into the Crims because of her "bubbly" stunt.

Tally returns to her carefree life as a Pretty. Her peace is disrupted when Zane, the leader of the Crims, asks her about David, whom she loved while she lived in the Smoke. Zane and Tally kiss and fall in love.

Zane had once known Croy and had been determined to escape to the Smoke before his surgery. He regrets that he failed to go into the wilderness at the time. Zane is eager to accompany Tally to find the object Croy has hidden for her. They face strenuous, dangerous physical challenges to locate the item, which is accompanied by a letter from Tally to herself, written before she was turned pretty. The letter explains to her future self why she became a Pretty: to test two pills that will cure her from the foggy-headed life of a Pretty. Tally was afraid to take the pills alone and so she and Zane split them right before Special Circumstances arrive. They are fitted with cuffs similar to interface rings, but they cannot come off.

After taking the pills, Zane starts getting bad headaches, but he seems to be more cured than Tally. One day, the Crims pull a bubbly trick by using alcohol to melt a hovering ice rink and crash a soccer game, which causes the clique to become famous. Later that night at the bonfire, Shay and Tally get into a huge fight, causing Shay to turn on Tally. Afterwards, Dr. Cable offers Tally a job as a Special, which she immediately turns down.

One day, Tally and Zane are found by Sussy and Dex, two Uglies who helped Tally and David back when she was at the Smoke. While in Uglyville, they find out that Shay has started a clique with Crim rejects, the Cutters in which they cut themselves to cure the lesions. Zane has a headache attack, and Tally takes him to the hospital under the guise of an injured hand.

Zane and Tally soon get to decide to escape the city with a few other Crims. Fausto helps Zane and Tally get the cuff off, and they soon escape the city by hoverboarding out of a hot-air balloon. Peris, Tally's friend from her Ugly days, decides in the balloon that he does not want to go to the New Smoke, but he agrees to stall for Tally. Tally's hoverboard crashes, and she falls into a reservation with rather primitive people who seem to be very violent. She is considered a god there because of her beauty. There, she meets Andrew Simpson Smith, the village holy man, who is the only one who speaks her language, which they call the language of the gods, with significant fluency.

Andrew tries to help her reach the Rusty Ruins, though he says that they are beyond the end of the world. Through their travels, Tally comes to deduce that the villagers are living in a forcefield-protected reservation in which Specials and Pretty Scientists conduct experiments about violence and ways to reduce mankind's violent nature. During this time, Tally starts to wonder if Dr. Cable's words to her have some truth. Perhaps the Pretty operation that clouds everyone's minds is the only way that humans can live in peace without destroying each other or the planet.

Tally steals a hovercar from the visiting scientists to escape to the Rusty Ruins. When she calls, she sees someone coming down on a hoverboard and is shocked to find that it is David who has come to take her to the New Smoke. When she arrives, Maddy tells her that the pills she and Zane that took separately were meant to be taken together. Zane's pill contained the nanos that were supposed to eat away the lesions, but they ate more of Zane's brain tissue than the lesions because they needed the pill that Tally took to stop them. Tally, in fact, cured herself, since the pill that she took only stopped nanos; it did not contain nanos itself to heal the lesions.

They soon discover that when Zane went to the hospital, a tracker chip was put in his tooth. Tally decides to stay with Zane instead of escaping with David. David believes that she wants to stay with Zane only because he is a Pretty. To make David leave and not get caught himself, Tally tells him to "get his ugly face out of here." It has the desired result and he flees. She stays with Zane which leads to her getting caught by the Specials along with Fausto. She discovers Shay has been turned into a Special. The book ends with Shay saying, "Face it Tally-wa, you're special."

== Reception ==
A review in Horn Book Magazine said that while Pretties "suffers from some typical middle-book problems" as the second installment in a trilogy, "the world Westerfeld creates is both appealing and appalling; the pace moves quickly with twists; and Tally is a memorable, believable character".

A review in The Guardian said: 'Pretties is an excellent book that shows the reader another side of Tally's world. There are some major twists and changes in character, and I loved following Tally on her heart–pounding, heart–wrenching journey'.

== See also ==
- The Uglies series
- Scott Westerfeld
- Dystopian fiction
