= The Risen Empire =

2003 novel by Scott Westerfeld

- First edition
- Author: Scott Westerfeld
- Original title: Succession
- Cover artist: Stephan Martinière
- Language: English
- Series: Succession
- Genre: Hard Science Fiction
- Published: March 1, 2003 Tor Books
- Publication place: United States
- Media type: Print (hardback & paperback)
- Pages: 304
- ISBN: 0-7653-0555-0 (first edition, hardback)
- OCLC: 51086881
- Dewey Decimal: 813/.54 21
- LC Class: PS3573.E854 R5 2003
- Followed by: The Killing of Worlds

The Risen Empire is a science fiction novel by American writer Scott Westerfeld.

== Setting and plot ==
The novel is set in an undefined distant future (although it is implied to exist roughly 5,000 years from now), in which there is a galactic empire spanning eighty worlds, amongst other human civilizations. The empire is ruled by the Risen Emperor, who has discovered the secret of immortality through means of a symbiont (spelled "symbiant" in the novel). Immortality is conferred on favored Imperial citizens, referred to as the 'grays'. The life of the 'grays' is governed by strict ritual and a form of worship towards the Emperor, including long pilgrimages in his honor. To create balance, the living citizens of the Empire are represented by an elected Imperial Senate, and by elected governments on each world. Another prominent group within the Empire includes the Plague Axis, a group that deliberately leave themselves vulnerable to disease to preserve human genetic diversity. Faster than light travel is impossible (although FTL communication via quantum entanglement is used), and the result of more mundane interstellar travel between the eighty worlds of the empire results in relativistic effects due to the high speeds involved; as such, the ages of space travelers become out of sync with those of their friends and family, an effect known as the "Time Thief". Other parties in the Empire, such as the Imperial Senate, are also subject to the "Time Thief" due to the use of cryogenic freezing. The Empire, protected by the Imperial Navy, is at war with a cult of fanatical cyborgs known as the Rix, who worship compound artificial intelligences. These emergent intelligences arise from sufficiently interconnected computer networks, ranging from public communications to traffic lights to classified government computers.

The central characters are Captain Laurent Zai of the Imperial Navy, and Senator Nara Oxham, a member of the Secularist Party, which opposes worship of the Emperor and the use of the symbiont to create immortality. Despite their political differences, the two become lovers. Zai is sent away to fight the Rix; due to the death of the Emperor's sister at the hands of the Rix, Zai is expected to commit ritual suicide to mark his failure, but chooses not to do so. Senator Oxham, appointed to the Emperor's War Council, opposes unpalatable war plans that would lead to the sacrifice of billions of Imperial citizens in order to preserve state secrets contained in the compound intelligences.

The storyline is continued in The Killing of Worlds, released in 2003.

== Reception ==
Publishers Weekly called it "exceptionally smart and empathetic", and noted that Westerfeld "keep(s) the reader constantly off-balance". Kirkus Reviews was less positive, faulting the book for having "horrendously slow" flashback sequences and judging the book as a whole to be "an exposition-heavy introduction to a sequel" (while conceding that it was "sprightly" and had "breathless action sequences").

SF Signal considered it an "excellent example of space opera", with "strong characters" and "lots of cool technology", but criticized Westerfeld for excessive portrayal of politics. John Clute described it as "considerably better than good", and praised Westerfeld for providing "some of the neatest, most kinetically exact, clearest-written hi-tech action (Clute has) come across".
