= Leviathan (Westerfeld novel) =

Novel by Scott Westerfeld

- Author: Scott Westerfeld
- Illustrator: Keith Thompson
- Cover artist: Keith Thompson; Sammy Yuen Jr.
- Language: English
- Series: Leviathan Trilogy
- Genre: Biopunk, Alternate history, Dieselpunk
- Publisher: Simon Pulse
- Publication date: October 6, 2009
- Publication place: United States
- Media type: Print (hardback)
- Pages: 434 (USA Version)
- ISBN: 978-1-4169-7173-3
- OCLC: 290477162
- Followed by: Behemoth

Leviathan is a 2009 novel written by Scott Westerfeld and illustrated by Keith Thompson. It is the first work in the trilogy of the same name, followed by sequels Behemoth and Goliath. The trilogy is set in an alternative version of World War I in which the Central Powers (known in-universe as "Clankers") use mechanized walkers and the Triple Entente (known in-universe as "Darwinists") genetically fabricate living creatures for use in battle. Leviathan was named the Best Young Adult Novel by the Aurealis Award in 2009, Locus in 2010, and Mir Fantastiki in 2011.

== Plot ==
The novel opens at the beginning of an alternative version of World War I, where the Austro-Hungarians and Germans use Clankers, diesel-driven mecha loaded with guns and ammunition, while the British Darwinists employ genetically engineered animals as their weaponry. The titular Leviathan is a whale airship, the most masterful beast in the British fleet.

The novel follows two characters: Aleksandar "Alek" of Hohenberg, a prince of the Austro-Hungarian Empire; and Deryn Sharp, a commoner girl. Aleksandar is on the run after his people turn against him and his family. Deryn, by contrast, is posing as a boy ("Dylan") to be allowed into the British airship navy.

After an accident during a flying attempt to prove her airworthiness, Deryn is rescued by the Leviathan and inducted into its crew. She learns the ship's mission is to transport Dr. Barlow (a top British "boffin", or scientist) and a secret package to Constantinople.

The book follows the ship's flight across Europe, until it's attacked by German airplanes. The crew fights back and defeats the planes, but crash-land in Switzerland where Aleksandar and his fencing teacher, Volger, are hiding.

The two witness the crash from their refuge. Volger insists they do nothing to interfere, as they will risk being captured. Despite this, Alek secretly leaves the fortress to bring medicine to the crew of the fallen ship. Alek finds an unconscious Deryn and revives her. Deryn is suspicious of him and sounds the alarm, resulting in Alek's capture. The secret cargo brought by Dr. Barlow is revealed to be eggs of some kind, though most were destroyed in the crash.

Alek's "family" comes to his rescue, and battle almost erupts between the two sides, but Deryn's quick thinking convinces everyone to call a truce and speak to each other. Realizing that the group's differences are outweighed by their similarities, Alek offers a sizable chunk from their food storage so the ship can replenish its hydrogen supply and take off again. As they travel back to the ship, two German zeppelins appear and send out commandos to capture them, severely damaging the Stormwalker walking machine that Alek and Volger had fled in.

The two groups decide to combine their technologies and leave together. Alek also admits his true origins to Deryn and Dr. Barlow when he realizes he let a few too many things slip. The Austrians dismantle the Stormwalker and use its engines to replace those lost by the Leviathan. The Clanker engines prove to be much more powerful than their previous ones, propelling them quickly away from danger.

In the aftermath, Dr. Barlow reveals information about a fabricated ship in England that was sold to the Ottoman Empire but then taken back by Winston Churchill despite being paid in full, thus creating tension between the British and the Ottomans. The novel closes with the Leviathan continuing its flight towards Constantinople, with Alek watching the mysterious eggs that will hatch into some unknown fabricated species.

== Development ==
The idea of incorporating illustrations into the Leviathan Trilogy began back in 2007 when author Westerfeld discovered illustrations for the Japanese translation of his earlier work Uglies, which he had shared on his blog. He was met with feedback from English-speaking fans who complained of how their novels were lacking in such features; until one reader pointed out how they are a norm in Japanese novels, particularly light novels. Further research by Westerfeld also found it to be a commonality in old Western novels before the invention of the camera. Inspiration also came from adventure novels that were around during the World War I era, which became one basis of research for the series' settings.

== Anime adaptation ==
In June 2024, Netflix announced an anime series based on the novels. Produced by Qubic Pictures with animation production by Orange, the series was released globally on July 10, 2025.

== Reception ==
Leviathan received a starred review from Kirkus Reviews and was compared to works by Hayao Miyazaki, Kenneth Oppel, and Naomi Novik. Even such, Kirkus Reviews stated that the novel could "stand—or fly—on its own". It also gained a starred review from School Library Journal, who said it was "full of nonstop action" and that "this steampunk adventure is sure to become a classic". The ALSC selected it as a 2010 Notable Children's Book and the YALSA listed it on their 2010 Best Books for Young Adults. In addition, Leviathan won the 2009 Aurealis Award for Best Young Adult Novel.
