= Peeps (novel) =

2005 novel by Scott Westerfeld

- Peeps first edition cover.
- Author: Scott Westerfeld
- Cover artist: Jason Ralls
- Language: English
- Genre: Young adult Science fiction
- Publisher: Penguin Group
- Publication date: February 8, 2005
- Publication place: United States
- Media type: Print (Paperback)
- Pages: 304
- ISBN: 1-59514-083-2
- OCLC: 71337973
- Followed by: The Last Days

Peeps (also Parasite Positive) is a 2005 novel by Scott Westerfeld revolving around a parasite which causes people to become cannibalistic and repelled by that which they once loved. It follows the protagonist, Cal Thompson, as he lives with this parasite and tries to uncover a possible threat to the whole population of the world. The apocalyptic threat to the world that begins in Peeps continues in The Last Days, which features some of the same characters.

== Plot summary ==
Two days after arriving in New York for college, Cal loses his virginity to a girl who picks him up. From that encounter Cal picks up an STD, but it is an unusual one since it turns its victims into "peeps"—parasite positives—raving cannibalistic monsters with unusual strength, night vision, heightened senses, and an affinity with rats. Cal himself turns out to be immune, but he is a carrier. He gets the strength and senses without the nasty side effects. However, before he knows it, he has infected others.

Cal is recruited by the Night Watch, a secret government organization that has existed for centuries to contain the disease and its victims. His first assignment is to capture all the girls he has infected. But soon Cal realizes that there is more going on than he has been told since the disease is changing in response to mysterious forces from under the earth that are waking up after centuries of slumber.

== Characters ==
=== Cal Thompson ===
The protagonist of the novel, Cal is a "carrier" of the parasite. Essentially, his body contains the parasite that in most people causes dementia, cannibalism, and other vampiric symptoms. Cal gains the advantages of the parasite without suffering from the dementia and suffers only minor side effects. Because the parasite is transferred through almost any bodily fluid, it causes Cal to feel sexually aroused at all times. Its effects on people who are not carriers, however, force him to resist these urges, which prevents him from having any natural relationships.

Cal is nineteen years of age, and has been a carrier of the parasite for a year when the novel begins. He is a hunter for the Night Watch, hunting down out of control Peeps (or Parasite Positives) beginning with his ex-girlfriends, whom he infected. The Night Watch dates back to colonial times in America but has never revealed itself to society for fear of causing widespread panic. The novel focuses primarily on his hunt for Morgan, the mysterious woman who infected him with the parasite. Along the way, he forms a relationship with Lace and discovers that the Night Watch has not told him all that they should have.

=== Lace ===
Lacey, known primarily as Lace, meets Cal by chance in the elevator of her apartment building. Because of her conviction in wanting to keep her expensive apartment at the amazingly low price she currently lives in it for, she tags along in Cal's investigation in search of the means to which she can blackmail her landlord. She becomes entangled in Cal's life and duties as a member of the Night Watch after being infected by his cat Cornelius, who had made her a carrier, and on the way begins to form an emotional tie with him.

=== Morgan Ryder ===
Cal's progenitor, Morgan changed his life eternally when she infected him with the parasite. She met him a year prior to the beginning of the novel at a gay bar called "Dick's Bar". She is from one of the city's "old families," and her parasite is part of the "old strain," meaning that she does not go crazy from the parasite but still gets things like superhuman hearing and strength.

== Setting ==
The novel itself begins in Hoboken, New Jersey but mostly takes place in the heart of New York City. Also, it takes place a lot in the sewers below New York.

== Parasite ==
The parasite featured in the novel is portrayed as being the source of many myths and legends. The symptoms in a carrier are only a craving for fresh meat and sexual arousal around the clock, but the symptoms of the normally affected are quite different. The parasite causes dementia and cannibalism, which were suggested as causing legends of most notably vampires, but also werewolves and zombies, among others. The protagonist describes the superhuman strength, speed, and vision as the human body simply operating on emergency power. He describes it as being the same as a mother protecting her child, specifically the rush of adrenaline provided so that she can act as she needs to. The parasite simply causes the body to act on this emergency adrenaline all the time, requiring extra food.

The superior abilities are shown in the novel several times by Cal. He claims to need to tape over the light of his DVD player to be able to sleep at night and can read fine print by starlight. He jumps fearlessly from a balcony to the one beside it, which causes suspicion from Lace, not afflicted with the parasite at the time. The parasite can be spread either directly from human to human, or via an infected rat or cat. Rats are shown to be attracted to infected persons. The parasite also seems to give those infected with it either immortality or at least extreme longevity, as shown by the Nightmayor, who had lived for centuries.

Two different strains were featured in the novel. The first to appear is a new strain, the symptoms and possible treatments for which have been known to Cal prior to the events of the novel. The body can react in two ways to this strain. The more common one causes dementia, cannibalism and a painful response to light of any kind. Other symptoms involved hatred of what was once loved, which can range from a singer to a skyline, which can be used to capture the infected, and nearly-total reliance of primitive instincts. Seemingly-supernatural strength is present in this response, but it is used most often in instinctive reactions and basic needs, primarily food. To keep the parasite spreading through the population of the earth, the infected can spread the parasite to rats, who defend them and continue to spread the parasite even if their progenitors cannot. The out-of-control cannibals who contract the disease and exhibit these symptoms are hunted down by the Night Watch, a group which fights to contain this strain of the parasite. There is no true cure for this reaction to the strain, and hospitalization coupled with an experimental plan of drugs is the only known treatment to contain a threat, apart from imprisonment.

The second possible reaction to this strain which is the much less common, involves a more subtle response. People who contract this strain of the parasite and receive this reaction are known as "carriers" of the disease since they do not suffer from its worst effects but have the possibility of spreading the disease nonetheless. A craving for meat remains, involving that of the human variety, but a carrier of the strain is no longer forced to succumb totally to their instincts. It is possible for the carriers of this strain to live a near normal life, because the stronger symptoms are absent. However, they must shy away from any close contact with others humans, involving simple things such as kissing and sharing a toothbrush, for fear of spreading the disease further. The worst of the remaining reactions, primarily sexual arousal and cravings for meat, can be overcome. The carriers are compared to Mary Mallon, most commonly referred to as Typhoid Mary, by the protagonist.

The second and older strain presents itself in a different manner. To the untrained eye, it may appear to be the same as the new strain. However, this strain is much more manageable. It appeared in ancient times, long before the new strain existed, and aided in defeating the attack of a race of large worms. By infecting as many people as possible, an army was created to defeat the giant worms threatening humanity. This older strain all but disappeared after it was no longer needed, existing only in a brood of rats living underground. When the giant worms that once threatened the existence of the human race return, they force the infected rats to the surface who then spread the old strain back into the human population. The strain is used to defeat the giant worms once again, allowing the human race to survive, but not without a certain degree of damage done to the world. The dementia and cannibalism are present towards the beginning of the infection, and is much more easily treatable. Old methods which were used in the last large-scale parasite infection are rediscovered and used, such as garlic and rosemary, which is evidently meant to represent the beginnings of vampire legends involving garlic as protection.

The parasite is further explained in The Last Days, which adds another dimension to the parasite. It is revealed that in ancient times, there were certain "singers" that could call up giant worms from within the Earth so that they could be more easily killed. That allowed the army of fighters against the giant worms to attract the worms under their preferred conditions, such as time and location, with sufficient preparation. The singers were able to attract the worms by singing words that were guided by the parasite living within them, sounding meaningless to the average human, but captivating nonetheless. Dr. Prolix ("The Shrink"), an age old carrier of the parasite has vague memories of seeing one of these singers calling a giant worm up to be killed, and Minerva, a prominent character in The Last Days, has inherited that ability from the parasite positives of centuries ago. She experiences receiving these songs from underground in her home, where old burial grounds are located, giving a possible origin to that ability.

== Other parasites ==
Many other parasites are discussed within the story, each one adding to the plausibility of the story, One of them is Toxoplasmosis, a parasitic disease caused by the protozoan Toxoplasma gondii. Another is Trematoda, a parasitic worm that is commonly referred to as a fluke. Wolbachia, a bacterium, was also mentioned.

== Awards and nominations ==
Peeps was nominated for the 2006 Andre Norton Award, bestowed in May 2007. It was listed as one of the 2006 ALA Best Books YA Awards and selected as one of the "Best Books of the Year" in 2005 by School Library Journal.
