= Fine Prey =

1998 novel by Scott Westerfeld

- Author: Scott Westerfeld
- Cover artist: Peter Gudynas
- Language: English
- Genre: Science fiction
- Publisher: Roc
- Publication date: 1998
- Publication place: United States
- Media type: Print (Paperback)
- Pages: 288
- ISBN: 978-0-451-45697-7

Fine Prey is a science fiction novel by Scott Westerfeld.
