= The Killing of Worlds =

2003 novel by Scott Westerfeld

- Author: Scott Westerfeld
- Cover artist: Stephan Martiniere
- Language: English
- Series: Succession
- Genre: Hard Science Fiction
- Publisher: Macmillan Books
- Publication date: 2003
- Publication place: United States
- Media type: Print
- Pages: 336 pp
- ISBN: 978-0-7653-0850-4
- Preceded by: The Risen Empire

The Killing of Worlds is a science fiction novel by American writer Scott Westerfeld.

The events detailed below immediately follow those of the novel The Risen Empire.

== Plot summary ==
Imperial Captain Laurent Zai is sent on a suicide mission to defeat an incursion by the Rix, a space-faring nation who worship planet-sized artificial intelligences (AIs). The planet he is protecting from the Rix is home to a newly emergent AI named Alexander, which the local population is helpless to remove. Although severely outclassed, and in spite of deadly mutineers, Captain Zai is successful in destroying his Rix opponent; he also discovers that the Rix ship was shielding and transporting a vast swarm of silicon particles.

Alexander uses the help of a surviving Rix commando and her Imperial lover to project his consciousness into space, inhabiting the silicon particles as an independent entity. Although political guardians on Captain Zai's ship try to prevent it, he makes peaceful contact with both Alexander and with the Rix commando. From them, he learns the greatest secret of his Emperor; the Emperor's claim that he can revive people from death and give them an eternal post-life is false. In fact, the Emperor's 'symbiont' technology gives a semblance of life after death, but not the eternal life that is promised.

Laurent Zai's empathic lover is Senator Nara Oxham, a woman who is elevated to the Emperor's war cabinet. She discovers that the Emperor has assigned Zai a suicidal mission, and that the Emperor intends to destroy the AI by destroying the planet which Laurent Zai is protecting. Another member of the war cabinet, a member of the plague axis, warns her that the paranoia of the Empire is leading them all into genetic inviability. When the Nara warns Zai of his danger, she is arrested for treason. Immediately before her trial, Laurent shares the Emperor's secret, and she exposes his story to the entire population.

== Bibliography ==
- The Killing of Worlds. Macmillan. 2003. ISBN 978-0-7653-0850-4.; reprint Macmillan, 2008, ISBN 978-0-7653-2052-0

== Reviews ==
- "REVIEW: The Killing of Worlds by Scott Westerfeld", SFSignal, December 3, 2004
- "Review: The Killing of Worlds and The Risen Empire, by Scott Westerfeld", Only the Best Science Fiction and Fantasy, 6/08/2010
