= Dimorphic root system =

Two-part root system

A dimorphic root system is a plant root system with two distinct root forms, which are adapted to perform different functions. One of the most common manifestations is in plants with both a taproot, which grows straight down to the water table, from which it obtains water for the plant; and a system of lateral roots, which obtain nutrients from superficial soil layers near the surface. Many plants with dimorphic root systems adapt to the levels of rainfall in the surrounding area, growing many surface roots when there is heavy rainfall, and relying on a taproot when rain is scarce. Because of their adaptability to water levels in the surrounding area, most plants with dimorphic root systems live in arid climates with common wet and dry periods.
