= Polymorph (novel) =

1997 novel by Scott Westerfeld

- Author: Scott Westerfeld
- Cover artist: Peter Gudynas
- Language: English
- Genre: Science fiction
- Publisher: Roc Books
- Publication date: December 1, 1997
- Publication place: United States
- Media type: Print (Hardcover & Paperback)
- Pages: 288
- ISBN: 0-451-45660-2
- OCLC: 38008743

Polymorph is a 1997 cyberpunk novel by American science fiction author Scott Westerfeld.

== Plot ==
"Milica Raznakovic" is the principal alias employed by the protagonist, a shape-changer or "polymorph". Living in a recession-hit future New York, she spends her time partying anonymously, each night in a different body, enjoying casual sex and absolutely no personal attachments. She believes herself to be unique. However, one night she meets another polymorph: older, malicious and much more powerful than herself. The brief and ultimately hostile encounter leads her to place herself in danger by attempting to determine the newcomer's objective, which somehow involves a wealthy industrialist. In the process of her investigation, she finds it necessary to seek an ally, reaching out to her last one-night stand, a young man she would normally not have sought out again.
