= Scott Westerfeld =

American writer of young adult fiction (born 1963)

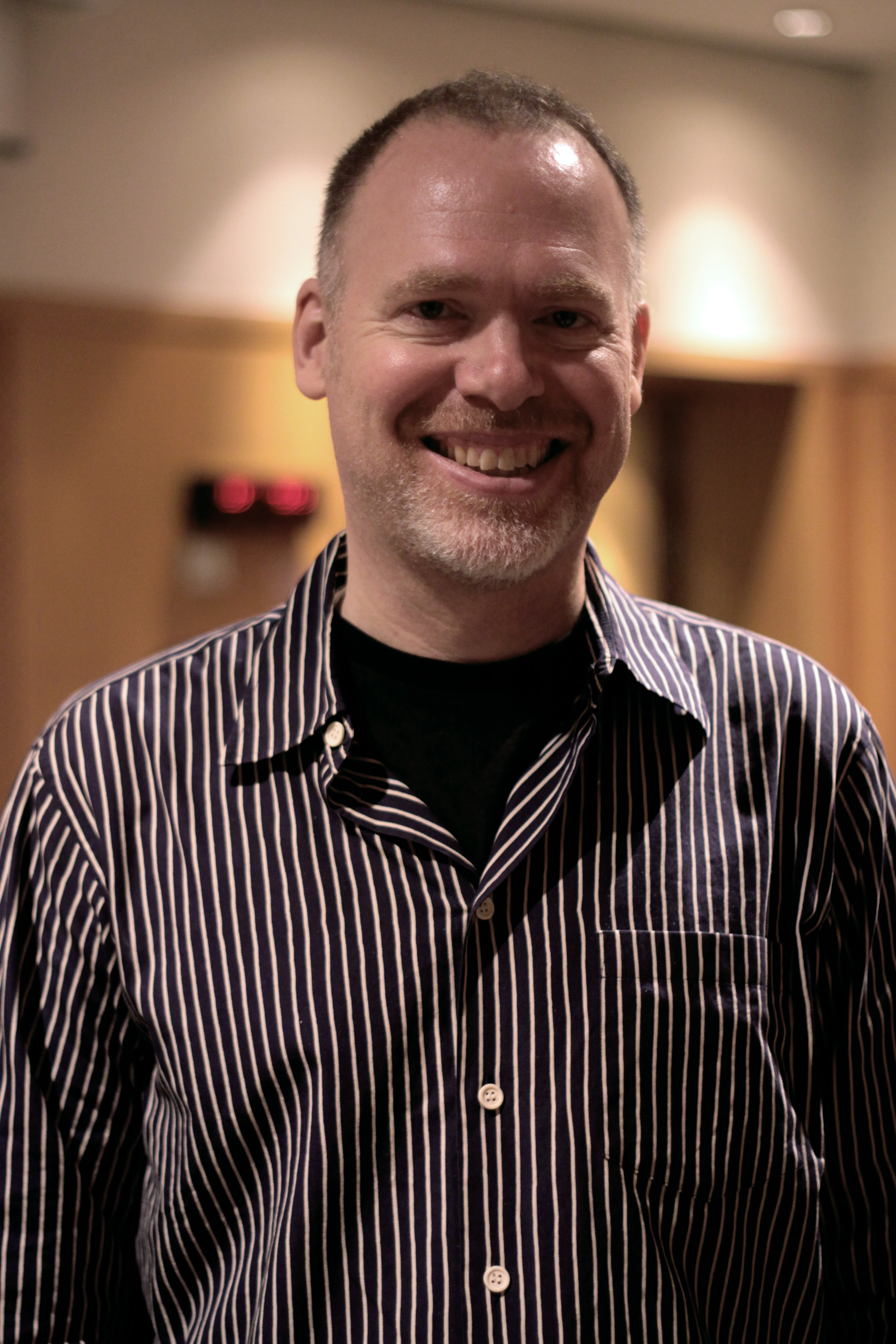
- Westerfeld at Utopiales 2010
- Born: May 5, 1963 (age 63); Dallas, Texas, U.S.
- Education: Vassar College (AB)
- Occupations: Writer; composer; media designer
- Spouse: Justine Larbalestier (m. 2001)
- Writing career
- Period: 1990s–present
- Genres: Young adult, science fiction
- Website: scottwesterfeld.com

Scott David Westerfeld (born May 5, 1963) is an American writer of young adult fiction, best known as the author of the Uglies and the Leviathan series.

== Early life ==
Scott Westerfeld was born in Dallas, Texas. As a child, he moved to Connecticut for his father Lloyd, who had a job as a computer programmer for UNIVAC. He saw his father working with planes for Lockheed Martin, submarines for Electric Boat, and NASA's Apollo missions; these projects made his family move across the states frequently, and he developed a penchant for storytelling to his peers and teachers who often asked him about his hometown.

Westerfeld graduated from Vassar College with an A.B. in Philosophy in 1985. He began composing music as a teenager and composes music for modern dance. In 2001, Westerfeld married Australian author Justine Larbalestier.

As of 2013, Westerfeld divided his time between Sydney, Australia and New York City.

== Books ==
Westerfeld is best known for the Uglies series and its spin-offs. Other novels of his include Afterworlds and, for adults, The Risen Empire and The Killing of Worlds, parts one and two of Succession.

Westerfeld began his career writing novels for adults, but switched to YA literature with his Midnighters trilogy. He has written four YA novels that take place in New York City: Peeps, The Last Days, So Yesterday, and Afterworlds. While The Last Days is not a sequel to Peeps, it follows a group of different characters in the same setting. So Yesterday is not related to these novels, but is often grouped with them because it is also set in New York City.

He has also written the Leviathan series, an alternate history trilogy set in World War I consisting of Leviathan, Behemoth and Goliath, plus its illustrated guide The Manual of Aeronautics.

In 2017, Westerfeld produced a graphic novel with illustrations by Alex Puvilland titled The Spill Zone. The graphic novel, released officially in October 2016 as an online syndication prior to the 2017 print release, tells of a photographer who ventures back into her upstate New York hometown abandoned by a mysterious event to take pictures of the occurrences happening there since.

In a blogpost in 2006, Westerfeld claimed to have ghostwritten five Goosebumps books, one of which was All-Day Nightmare, one of the entries in the Give Yourself Goosebumps series which came out in February 2000.

Several of his novels have been optioned for films. So Yesterday has been optioned to be made into a film by one of the producers of Fahrenheit 9/11 and Bowling for Columbine. However, this option 'slowly died', as Scott Westerfeld wrote on his blog. The Uglies series was optioned in 2006 by Twentieth Century Fox as a possible film series.

== Themes ==
A major theme in Westerfeld's work is the idea of free thinking or questioning authority. In Uglies, the protagonist Tally rebels against her society's rules first with harmless pranks and eventually by leaving the city altogether. She finds a group of runaway uglies who refuse to conform to social norms that includes undergoing cosmetic surgery. Similarly, So Yesterday examines popularity and why certain trends are considered 'cool.' The novels praises innovators who think outside the box and come up with new fashion statements entirely on their own.

Another common theme in Westerfeld's novels is coming of age. Because Westerfeld writes primarily for young adult audiences, his protagonists are usually teenagers who find themselves over the course of the novel or series. Tally in Uglies, Cal in Peeps and Hunter in So Yesterday all struggle with finding where they belong until they come to terms with who they are.

Courage is another common theme in Westerfeld's work. His protagonists often face frightening or dangerous problems and have to rely on their own courage to overcome the problem. Often adults are not present during the time of crisis and the protagonist is left to his or her own devices. For example, Cal in Peeps is trained by adults on how to track down vampires, but he goes alone to actually catch them and must accomplish this task completely on his own.

== Awards ==
- Evolution's Darling was a New York Times Notable Book (2000), and won a Special Citation for the 2000 Philip K. Dick Award
- So Yesterday won a Victorian Premier's Award
- The Secret Hour won an Aurealis Award
- Peeps and Uglies were both named as "Best Books for Young Adults" in 2006 by the American Library Association (ALA), and Peeps was in the Top Ten. Uglies was also selected for the ALA Popular Paperbacks for Young Adults 2006 list.
- Leviathan won the 2010 Locus Award for Best Young Adult Fiction and was nominated for an ORCA (Oregon Reader's Choice Award) in the intermediate division. The Russian translation of Leviathan was awarded by Mir Fantastiki as Best Young Adult Fiction in 2011.

== Bibliography ==
=== Adult ===
- Polymorph (1997)
- Fine Prey (1998)
- Evolution's Darling (2000)

==== Succession series ====
- The Risen Empire (2003)
- The Killing of Worlds (2003)

The two books were re-published in 2005 in one volume, also titled The Risen Empire.

==== The Mortons series (with Justine Larbalestier) ====
- The Mortons (upcoming, 2026)

=== Young adult ===
- So Yesterday (2004)
- Afterworlds (2014)
- Horizon (2017)

==== Midnighters trilogy ====
- The Secret Hour (2004)
- Touching Darkness (2005)
- Blue Noon (2006)

==== Peeps series ====
- Peeps (2005) (also known as Parasite Positive in Britain and V-Virus or Peeps in Canada)
- The Last Days (2006)

==== Uglies universe ====
===== Uglies series =====
- Uglies (2005)
- Pretties (2005)
- Specials (2006)
- Extras (2007)

===== Impostors series =====
- Impostors (2018)
- Shatter City (2019)
- Mirror's Edge (2021)
- Youngbloods (2022)

===== Related works =====
- Bogus to Bubbly: An Insider's Guide to the World of Uglies (2008)
- Graphic novel retellings from Shay's point of view:
  - Uglies: Shay's Story (with Devin Grayson and Steven Cummings) (2012)
  - Uglies: Cutters (with Devin Grayson and Steven Cummings) (2012)

==== Leviathan series (illustrated by Keith Thompson) ====
- Leviathan (2009)
- Behemoth (2010)
- Goliath (2011)

===== Related works =====
- The Manual of Aeronautics (illustrated guide) (2012)

==== Spill Zone graphic novel series (illustrated by Alex Puvilland) ====
- Spill Zone (2016)
- Spill Zone: The Broken Vow (2019)

===== Related works =====
- Spill Night (short story for Free Comic Book Day) (2017)

==== Zeroes trilogy (with Margo Lanagan and Deborah Biancotti) ====
- Zeroes (2015)
- Swarm (2016)
- Nexus (2018)
