= Goliath (Westerfeld novel) =

2011 Book by Scott Westerfeld

- First edition (US)
- Author: Scott Westerfeld
- Illustrator: Keith Thompson
- Cover artist: Evan Schwartz; Keith Thompson; Sammy Yuen, Jr.
- Language: English
- Series: Leviathan Trilogy
- Genre: Steampunk, alternate history
- Publisher: Simon & Schuster
- Publication date: US September 20, 2011 AUS October 3, 2011
- Publication place: United States
- English publication date: 2011
- Media type: print (Hardback)
- Pages: 545
- ISBN: 9781416971771
- Preceded by: Behemoth

Goliath is a biopunk/steampunk novel by Scott Westerfeld, and illustrated by Keith Thompson. The novel is the third and final installment in the Leviathan series after Behemoth, released on September 20, 2011.

Heir to the Austro-Hungarian throne in hiding Prince Aleksander, and Scottish midshipman Deryn "Dylan" Sharp rescue Serbian inventor Nikola Tesla from the site of a 1908 Siberian Tunguska event meteorite blast. Along the way, Alek sees through Deryn's male disguise of Dylan on the organic airship Leviathan while gradually learning of Tesla's motives of using his invented weapon Goliath to end the war on his own. Alek destroys the inventor and his Goliath weapon under German attack in New York, triggering the entry of U.S. into World War I.

== Plot ==
As the airship Leviathan travels over Russia, Aleksandar, Deryn, and Newkirk are in the middy's mess with the perspicacious loris Bovril, talking about great circle routes. Alek mentions Deryn's father was an airman, but Newkirk says that the airman was Deryn's uncle. A living two-headed messenger eagle from the Czar heads towards the bridge, interrupting their discussion. A message lizard sends Deryn to the bridge and Newkirk to the cargo deck. Alek goes with Deryn, and there, Dr. Barlow tells them to take the bird to the rookery and feed it. Deryn nearly confesses her secret to Alek, but hesitates to do so thus resisting herself. She quickly asks for a fencing lesson to cover it up. Count Volger tries to expose her gender unless she discloses the imperial message, but drops the attempt after some convincing from Deryn, who dares not to shake the confidence of Alek, who admires 'Dylan' unaware of her masquerade as a boy.

The imperial message is to pick up a crate from the back of a fighting bear, but it is much heavier than expected, overloaded by metal parts and tools, and drags Deryn and Newkirk down into the trees until the crew manages to compensate by dumping clart (waste water) and other supplies. Dr. Barlow orders Alek, Klopp, Hoffman, and Bauer to assemble the metal contraption and keep it secret. The loris shows them how it detects metal with Barlow's necklace.

Flying over Tunguska, Siberia, they notice the area has been destroyed, trees have been flattened and point in one direction, and many stripped corpses are present, including that of another organic airship. By dropping dried beef at a distance to distract giant starving fighting bears, they rescue Nikola Tesla, his Russian soldiers and airship crew, who are holed up near the center of the destruction. Tesla's electrified fence, which had kept the bears away, is deactivated to allow the Leviathan to land, so he scares off the rogue bears with his electrified walking stick.

Later at night, as Alek is unable to fall asleep, he reads a newspaper article about "Dylan" and the Dauntless by Eddie Malone. He realizes something is off about the story Deryn has told him about her family and past: Artemis Sharp had a surviving daughter named Deryn. Alek eventually becomes tired and falls asleep, with Bovril whispering "Mr. Deryn Sharp" into Alek's ear. Not long after, Dr. Barlow requests Alek and Deryn to use Tesla's device to pinpoint the inventor's bedroom. Deryn sneaks into the room and discovers a metal lump hidden under Tesla's bed, and scrapes off a sample that they discovered to have magnetic properties. Amidst their discussion, Alek takes up the chance of asking her, "Can I trust you, Deryn?" to which she spontaneously responds, and Alek leaves the room hiding his disappointment. Deryn, immensely shocked at the realization of Alek knowing her true identity, chases after him and they get into an argument. As the pressure eventually recedes and Deryn leaves him alone, Alek considers the fact that Deryn might have hidden her real identity out of her love for him.

For a few days, Alek and Deryn are not on speaking terms. Alek decides to support Tesla in his mission to end the war with his magnetic beam, the Goliath, but sadly misses Deryn; who meanwhile is angry of his dismissal of her just because she is a girl. Sent to Tokyo just to brandish the British flag, the Leviathan battles an Austrian ship and two German zeppelins in support of the Japanese. When one of the engines is shot, both Deryn and Alek arrive to help, and Alek admits he wants Deryn back as his friend. When Dr. Barlow wants Deryn to get new clothes, Alek saves her from discovery being measured by offering himself to the tailor's hands.

In Tokyo, Tesla demonstrates the Goliath publicly at a conference in the Imperial Hotel, claiming the sky color will change in London. A quick correspondence with the British royal family confirms the visible colors and orders the ship to New York for Tesla. While crossing the Pacific Ocean in a storm, Alek hits his head protecting Deryn. To keep him awake after a concussion, Deryn kisses him. They promise not to keep secrets from each other, and for Alek to lie protecting her secret.

Arriving at William Randolph Hearst's estate in California, Philip Francis, one of Hearst's assistants, films them. Reporter Eddie Malone is fleeing from Hearst's men, so Deryn helps him escape by letting him onboard. He suggests that Francis may be a German spy because he changed his last name from German. They use Tesla's detector to find arms and film hidden in kitten barrels after dinner and a cliff-hanger episode of the film Perils of Pauline, the adventuresome American female lead, which impresses Alek mightily.

As the Leviathan crosses Mexico, one of its engines suddenly stops. Several men who work for the Mexican revolutionary Pancho Villa offer to help them in exchange for sugar. Deryn sends one message about suspicious walkers, then dons gliding wings to investigate. She semaphores C-A-M-E-R-A in time, but injures her knee on landing. Alek gets Pancho Villa's physician, Dr. Azuela, to treat Deryn instead of the ship's Dr. Busk, but Eddie Malone overhears Deryn's secret when Azuela tells Pancho Villa. Pancho Villa and Mr. Francis film the Leviathan as part of Hearst's movie deal with Pancho.

Alek takes meals and helps Deryn keep her secret from the crew, but Deryn fears punishment in New York when Eddie Malone publishes his article. Alek is planning to stay in New York and help Tesla promote Goliath, and he asks Deryn to stay in New York with him to help Tesla. Dr. Barlow offers Deryn a job with the Zoological Society of London, but retracts her offer fearing a scandal from deception on the British government and the Royal Air Service after learning of Deryn's secret.

Meanwhile, Alek saves Eddie Malone from falling off when a rocket hits the jitney they were leaving on. Deryn, watching from the bridge, gets them to douse the flames with waste water. Alek shows Malone the Pope's letter to his claim to the throne as emperor so the reporter will keep Deryn's secret.

Dr. Barlow shows Deryn the article with Alek's story, not her secret, and offers Deryn the job again. At the Serbian consulate, Lilit (who has been made the assistant to the newly founded Ottoman Republic's ambassador since the events of Behemoth) reappears and tells Deryn about a German water-walker coming to attack Goliath, so Dr. Barlow convinces Captain Hobbes to keep watch. When the Leviathan sees approaching bubbles underwater, they bomb the escorts, while they leave the largest to land to prove the attack and encourage the Americans to join the war, so she sends a warning by eagle to Alek.

Tesla hosts a dinner at his tower, hoping to do a demonstration that the Goliath can change the color of the Berlin sky, but under attack decides to fire for real, despite danger to the nearby Leviathan. Volger uses a smoke bomb for surprise, and Alek has to use Tesla's own electrified cane to kill him. The suppressed energy electrocutes and destroys the water-walker, and the U.S. enters the war on the Darwinist side when they see the wreckage. Dr. Barlow receives a message that tells her that the sample Deryn stole from under Tesla's bed was from a meteorite, proving Goliath did not cause the Tunguska event.

Alek receives a medal for going with Deryn to fix Tesla's wire on the spine. After the ceremony, Alek and the barely-healed Deryn again climb the spine together. Alek tells her the truth about Tesla's death, declares his love by kissing her, and throws the Pope's scroll overboard. He rejects his past which he has already lost. When he admits to needing a job next, Deryn suggests joining her and Dr. Barlow at the London Zoological Society.

The last chapter is an epilogue in the form of a newspaper article by Eddie Malone. Alek relinquished his royal title as prince, with his only comment being a phrase associated with the Habsburgs: Bella gerant alii, tu felix Austria, nube or "Let others wage war. You, lucky Austria, shall marry." He and Deryn also accepted positions to work with the Zoological Society.

== Bonus chapter ==
On December 16, 2011; Westerfeld published a bonus chapter to the novel on his website.
