= Extras (novel) =

2007 novel by Scott Westerfeld

- Extras by Scott Westerfeld
- Author: Scott Westerfeld
- Language: English
- Genre: Young adult, Science fiction novel
- Publisher: Simon & Schuster
- Publication date: October 2, 2007
- Publication place: United States
- Media type: Print (hardback & paperback)
- Pages: 417
- ISBN: 1-84738-126-X
- OCLC: 148318216
- Preceded by: Specials

Extras is a young adult science fiction novel written by Scott Westerfeld. The novel was published and released by Simon & Schuster on October 2, 2007, and is a companion book to the Uglies series. However, Extras differs from its predecessors in that its protagonist is fifteen-year-old Aya Fuse, not Tally Youngblood. Tally is not the main character but still appears in the book's later chapters in a major role.

The book was generally received well by critics.

== Premise ==
Three years after the events of Specials freed the world from the pretty lesions that forced them to be obedient, society is beginning to settle into a new form. Each city has been forced to find a way of dealing with the new pressure on its resources, caused by the freed creativity of the inhabitants. In Japan, one city has chosen a "reputation economy" that rewards citizens either with merits for productive tasks that help the city or with face rank, a measure of popularity. Every inhabitant has their own feed, obsessively tracks their face rank, and hopes to gain fame and lose their status as an "extra." Aya Fuse tries to win fame as a "kicker," or journalist, filming stories with her modified hovercam Moggle and posting them for the whole city to see.

== Plot synopsis ==
Aya Fuse is a 15-year-old girl living in the futuristic city of Yokohama. One night, accompanied by her hovercam Moggle, she crashes a party in New Pretty Town in the hope of tracking down a group she saw surfing a mag-lev train, a story that she believes will make her famous. She follows one of the group's members, Eden Maru, out of the party, but they nearly get away when she is distracted by Frizz Mizuno, a more beautiful and far more famous person who compliments Aya. Aya leaves without telling Frizz her full name because she is embarrassed by her comparatively low face rank. She then follows Eden into a cave, where she is ambushed by the mag-lev riders, who call themselves the Sly Girls. The group's leader Lai gives Aya a chance to join them, but to do, so she is forced to drop Moggle into an underground lake.

The next day, she visits her famous brother Hiro in New Pretty Town, another kicker who is celebrating reaching the "top thousand," a list of the thousand most famous people in the city. Hiro and his friend Ren Machino refuse to believe Aya's tale of the Sly Girls, who are an urban legend in the city, but Ren, who designed Moggle, agrees to help Aya retrieve him. Aya also happens upon a story about Frizz and discovers that he started a clique based around a brain surgery called Radical Honesty, which enforces honesty and makes a person unable to lie. That evening, Aya goes mag-lev surfing with the Sly Girls and enjoys the experience in spite of not having a camera to film it. During the journey, the girls are surprised when the train stops, and they see inhuman figures loading the train up with a variety of items hidden within a secret underground room.

Aya retrieves Moggle and uses him to film her next excursion with the Sly Girls, a mag-lev surfing trip that ends in exploration of the underground room that they discovered. Inside are many large cylinders of metal and a large chute leading to the top of the mountain, neither of which is understood by the Sly Girls. They plan to return to explore further, but Aya's credibility is ruined by the kicking of a news story about Frizz Mizuno coming to talk to her by her dorm. Aya is forced to break off contact with Frizz in order to lose fame, which the Sly Girls despise, and the story leaves her disillusioned by the hateful comments of the kickers. However, she has the chance to tell Hiro and Ren about the Sly Girls story, and from her description, Ren guesses that the chute inside the mountain is a mass driver, which, combined with the steel projectiles, could be used to launch an attack on the city.

When Aya next meets the Sly Girls, they reveal that they knew she was a kicker, and have decided to allow her to kick the story of the mass driver in spite of their hatred of fame. They launch themselves and Aya out of the mass driver with homemade parachutes and give her one last thrill before they part ways, and they also give themselves time to move on to a different city. Aya kicks her story and becomes instantly famous but is concerned when she receives a message from Tally Youngblood telling her to "run and hide" and is nearly captured by the inhumans while trying to do so. Eventually, Aya uses her fame to take control of a high-security apartment and waits there until Tally arrives, accompanied by Shay and Fausto.

After talking, the Cutters (Tally, Shay, and Fausto) go hoverboarding with Aya, Hiro, Frizz, and Ren. Aya has a signal up for her hovercam, and the Cutters boost it so the inhumans could find them. They are soon captured and are on the inhumans' ship headed for a camp outside of the rusty ruins of Singapore. Frizz ruins their plan because of his Radical Honesty and so the Cutters knock out the inhumans and put the hovercar on autopilot, where more inhumans wait. The Cutters, Aya, Frizz, Hiro, and Ren jump out of the hovercar since they do not want to meet more inhumans. Soon, they have to travel through a jungle to meet David.

After deciding Aya, Ren, Hiro, and Frizz would get in the way, Tally, Shay, and Fausto plan to leave them where they were. Meanwhile, they, the Cutters, would go to destroy the ships of the inhumans. After they have left, Aya says that she is going as well. Ren, Hiro, and Frizz come with her. Soon, they are caught by the inhumans and meet Andrew Simpson Smith, who mistakes Aya for Tally. The inhumans, calling themselves Extras, explain they are using the metal for two things - to stop the human expansion, and to build space stations and rockets so that humans can start living in space as an answer to environmental problems. Soon, everyone is working together to stop the fire that Shay and Tally started.

With the mystery solved, Aya, Frizz, Hiro, and Ren all become global celebrities. Aya especially benefits and becomes the third most famous person in Yokohama after she kicks a story about the Extras that is appropriately called "Leaving Home." Aya, her friends, and the Cutters go to a party for only the most famous people in Yokohama: The Thousand Faces Party. There, Aya met Lai, the Sly Girls' leader. Lai tells Aya that the cake will explode (non-lethally) when it is cut and makes Aya promise not to tell anyone. After, Frizz tells Aya that he might leave Radical Honesty and decides that he did not need the group to tell the truth. Aya and Frizz watch Tally and David escape from the party on a balcony before going to watch (and possibly film) the cutting of the cake.

== Characters ==
Aya Fuse: The main character of the book, Aya is fifteen years old. Aya falls in love with Frizz Mizuno and becomes his girlfriend. Aya originally wanted to use the Sly Girls as an anchor to bring her miserable face rank up but turned out to save the world in the end. Her face rank went from 451,369 to 3.

Moggle: Aya's hovercam, with near artificial intelligence. Aya was forced to lose Moggle to join the Sly Girls but recovered it. Moggle constantly blinds her with its night-lights. She cannot stand being without Moggle, as it makes it somewhat hard to put things on her feeds; for example, Tally informed Aya not to send a transmission signal to Moggle so that the Extras would not see, but she did so anyway, which was used by Tally as a trap. Moggle was used as a tool for the Extras to convey to Aya the goodness in their actions.

Hiro Fuse: Aya's older brother. He was a pretty during the Prettytime but was cured thanks to the mind-rain, when all the Pretties were cured of the lesions on their brain. Being famous, he has become somewhat arrogant, and is still harping about fame.

Frizz Mizuno: A leader of a clique called "Radical Honesty" in which the members must have a brain surgery that gets rid of all deception. He becomes Aya's boyfriend. His surgery did not agree somewhat with the story as he was unable to hide anything and especially did not agree with Tally. She convinced him that he was not strong enough to tell the truth all the time (he had undergone the surgery because he lied constantly, especially to girls). His Radical Honesty saved the day as a tool to prove to Tally that he was not lying about the Extras. At the end of the story, Frizz decides to give up the clique.

Ren Machino: Hiro's friend who is good with technical things. He installed the mods on Moggle to make him waterproof, able to fly, able to carry Aya, and have artificial intelligence.

Jai/Kai/Lai and the Sly Girls: The clique did crazy things, but were forced to keep their face ranks down, or the wardens would catch and stop them. They keep their face ranks down by changing nicknames every so often. Aya joins them and tries to betray them to the public but realizes that she must do so anyway to save the world. Their original plan was to leave town once Aya kicked her story. However, Lai is seen at the Thousand Faces Party as a recruit to the Extras, and when Aya asks where the others are, Lai replies, "Probably all watching this party on their wallscreens." Their last trick was to have the cake explode at the Thousand Faces Party as soon as it is cut. It is unsure whether that was accomplished as the book ends before it can happen. Scott Westerfeld has stated that Lai's original name is Ai, using variations of the name as a cover-up, going in alphabetical order.

Eden Maru: Eden Maru, an 18-year-old pretty, is the most famous of the Sly Girls, with a face rank of less than 10,000. She is well known for being a city hoverball champion, as well has a tech-head, and is always seen floating around in her hoverball rig. Eden reveals to Aya that she joined the Sly Girls to get away from her fame. She adopts the nickname "Nosey" for Aya, in reference to her big nose, and all the questions that Aya bugs the Sly Girls with.

Miki: An ugly and member of the Sly Girls, who befriends Aya.

Tally Youngblood: The most famous person in the world, the architect of the mind-rain, and the original protagonist of the Uglies trilogy. Tally is almost 20 years old. Still a Special, Tally flocks to Japan when she sees Aya's City Killer story. She is still somewhat destructive thanks to the Special wiring in her brain. It is hinted that she may like David and be in a romantic relationship. She is ranked number 1 in the face rank.

David: David is an ugly and has never had any surgery at all. He used to be part of the Smokies and hates cities. He also helps Tally and the "Cutters" with different missions. He runs the new Special Circumstances with Tally. He has always been in love with Tally. In the book, it is hinted that they may like each other and be in a romantic relationship.

The Cutters : Characters from the Uglies series. The two Cutters seen are Shay and Fausto. They help David and Tally with different missions and help with Special Circumstances.

The Extras: Aya considers herself earlier in the novel as an Extra, someone with a low face rank, no popularity, etc. Eden Maru later explains to her the concept of film extras from the Rusties' era, which is the true origin of this term. The word eventually gains new meaning as being an abbreviation of "extraterrestrial".

Andrew Simpson Smith: The man from the village of little men that the scientists from Tally's City created.

== Critical reception ==
In his 2007 New York Times book review, James Hynes described Extras as being "just as thrilling as its predecessors, but it's also a thoughtful novel of ideas, a brilliant parody of the modern obsession with fame."

== See also ==
- The Uglies series
- Scott Westerfeld
