= Behemoth (novel) =

2010 novel by Scott Westerfeld

- First edition
- Author: Scott Westerfeld
- Illustrator: Keith Thompson
- Cover artist: Evan Schwartz; Keith Thompson; Sammy Yuen, Jr.
- Language: English
- Series: Leviathan Trilogy
- Genre: Steampunk, alternate history
- Publisher: Simon Pulse
- Publication date: October 5, 2010
- Publication place: United States
- Media type: Print (hardback)
- Pages: 496
- ISBN: 978-1-4169-7175-7
- Preceded by: Leviathan
- Followed by: Goliath

Behemoth is the second installment in the Leviathan series by Scott Westerfeld. It was published on October 5, 2010.

As with the series' first book, Leviathan, the audiobook is read by Alan Cumming.

The sequel, Goliath, was released on September 20, 2011.

== Plot ==
The novel is set in a fantasy version of World War I where Austro-Hungarians and German forces fight using "Clankers", diesel-driven mecha, while the British use genetically engineered "fabricated" animals as their weaponry and transport. The titular Leviathan is a whale airship, the flagship beast in the British fleet.

The plot picks up directly from 'Leviathan'. It follows Deryn Sharp, a commoner girl masquerading as a boy to be allowed in the British Navy, and Aleksandar "Alek" of Hohenberg, a previous prince of the Austro-Hungarian Empire who's now been exiled by his own family.

At the start of 'Behemoth', the Leviathan sights two German ships and decides to attack them. Alek and his mechanic, Klopp, are controlling the engines, with Mr. Hirst, the Leviathan's chief engineer, observing. However, they discover that one of the ships is preparing a threatening Tesla cannon, a lightning generator that would decimate the Leviathan.

Klopp immediately puts the engines on full retreat without permission. Mr. Hirst, seeing this as an act of mutiny, attempts to interfere and shoot Klopp with a compressed air pistol. However, Alek leaps at Mr. Hirst and ends up getting shot in the ribs, though not fatally. The lightning still hits and another boy, Newkirk, is almost killed, but is saved by Deryn.

After the escape Alek gets a visit from Deryn and Dr. Barlow, a celebrated British scientist. He explains what happened on the ship.

Later, Deryn delivers a message to Alek's previous tutor, Count Volger, who learns that Alek had told her of his identity as a prince.

After landing in Istanbul, Aleksandar plots an escape from the Leviathan. The night of the escape, Alek is taking watch over Dr. Barlow's eggs when one egg hatches revealing a "perspicacious" loris, as identified later by Dr. Barlow, that seems to understand and repeat various sounds and words in seemingly useful ways. The creature then latches onto Alek and flees with him. In their escape Volger and Hoffman remain behind in order to allow Alek and the others to flee. The group manages to head into the city of Istanbul, where they try to remain hidden among the commoners. Alek and Corporal Bauer leave the hotel after laying low for a while with Klopp, one of the masters of mechanics. Alek discovers a very nosy American reporter by the name of Eddie Malone, in which he discovers some information about the Leviathan that he finds interesting. At that point, a few German soldiers walk in, searching for Bauer. They make a hasty escape only to be caught by Zaven, a leader of one of many resistance groups against the sultan's rule collective known as the Committee of Union and Progress.

Back on the Leviathan, Deryn finds Eddie Malone who is aboard the ship to relay Alex's message to a now-captured Volger. Deryn reluctantly brings him to the count's room. The count this time proposes that Deryn help him escape the ship. Deryn refuses initially, until Volger threatens to divulge her masquerade -that he had figured out all by himself- to Malone, to which she agrees with a heavy heart. Hours later, Deryn is assigned a secret mission in the Gallipoli peninsula to plant a fabricated barnacle that destroys metal into the Ottoman Empire's kraken net in order for Britain to attack once the Ottoman Empire joins sides with Germany. The mission is successful, but the others in her four-member team are captured or killed. Deryn manages to evade capture and enters Ottoman territory, deciding to find Alek.

Meanwhile, Alek hides from the public view, he ends up scuffling with a girl who turns out to be Zaven's daughter, Lilit. Zaven formally introduces the young lady and his mechanical bed-ridden mother Nene, who both are also taking part in a revolution prepared by the Committee. Alek then agrees to join the Committee as an ally, wishing to strike a blow at the Germans. They then stage a revolt, using a gold bar Alek has saved for funding. They buy up parts and much spice at the advice of Deryn, who used it as a weapon against a German agent trying to hijack the British embassy's walker. They prepare the Committee's walkers for throwing spice bombs. Because Deryn reveals that the Behemoth, a massive fabricated sea creature of Britain, will eliminate the ironclads with the guidance of the Leviathan, the Committee executes a mission unknown to much of the group to destroy a massive Tesla cannon in Istanbul. While the revolt is successful, Zaven is killed destroying the Tesla cannon. Deryn, Alek and Lilit meet up again with the former two giving the tragic news to Lilit. As planned, the British invade and use the Behemoth to obliterate the ironclads Goebon and Breslau. Before leaving the cliffs for the now chaotic Istanbul by body kite to continue fighting in the revolution, Lilit bids "Dylan" and Alek goodbye; while mentioning to the former that she also knows of "his" secret. The others all escape aboard the Leviathan. When all of the people on the ship discover that Alek is a prince from Eddie Malone's newspaper, they treat him with great respect. The third novel, Goliath, is set in motion when they find out they are going to the Far East.

== Reception ==
Publishers Weekly wrote "This exciting and inventive tale of military conflict and wildly reimagined history should captivate a wide range of readers. Thompson's evocative and detailed spot art (as well as the luridly gorgeous endpapers) only sweetens the deal." while Common Sense Media called it a "Sci-fi stand-out with high adventure, great characters."
