= Midnighters trilogy =

Sci-fi book series by Scott Westerfeld

The Midnighters Trilogy is a science-fiction fantasy series written by Scott Westerfeld. It was published by Eos in 2004. It comprises three books: The Secret Hour, Touching Darkness. and Blue Noon. Over the course of the trilogy, Jessica encounters other Midnighters with whom she allies herself. The protagonists in the trilogy are the eponymous Midnighters Desdemona (referred to as Dess), Rex, Jonathan, and Melissa. The antagonists of the series are Darklings and Slithers, dangerous and powerful beings that created and live in the Blue Hour.

== The Midnighters ==
In the Midnighters Trilogy, individuals born at midnight are able to live within the Blue Time in Bixby, Oklahoma. These individuals are referred to as "Midnighters". As well as the ability to travel within the Blue Time, each Midnighter is gifted with super-human abilities. It is implied in Blue Noon that a Midnighter's power will not work outside of Bixby, but that remains unconfirmed, as none of the Midnighters leave the town during the course of the trilogy. Alongside their superhuman abilities, comes the disadvantage of being highly sensitive to intense light.

In The Secret Hour, it is revealed that prior to the current generation of Midnighters, there used to be a large collective of Midnighters that, for all intents and purposes, ran the small town of Bixby in an attempt to protect it from the Darklings Rex manages to deduce that from both historical accounts and "The Lorem" notes made by previous Midnighters. However, approximately 50 years before the beginning of the book The Lore ceased to be updated for unknown reasons. The disappearance of the previous generation of Midnighters remains a mystery until the second book, Touching Darkness.

The Midnighters Trilogy features five main protagonists, all of whom are Midnighters. Despite all possessing the ability to pass into the Blue Time, they do not always work together, which results from personal conflicts between members.

=== Jessica Day ===
For the majority of The Secret Hour, Jessica's ability is unknown. At the conclusion of the novel, it is revealed that Jessica is a "flame bringer," a rare talent that allows her to create fire and use electrical devices during the Blue Time. This makes her a valuable addition to the team, as she can use this ability to be a formidable opponent against the Darklings, who fear light, fire, and technology. Her first use of this power was a flashlight initially named Serendipitous. As both fire and technology can be used outside the Blue Time, Jessica's power is effectively useless in regular time. (However, she is the only one who does not suffer adverse effects from being in daylight; Rex is effectively blind, Dess becomes photophobic, Melissa is plagued by the thoughts of humanity, and Jonathan must constantly shift between low and normal gravity.)

At the climax of Blue Noon, Jessica uses her ability to harness the power of a lightning bolt to fight the Darklings. That proves effective and wipes out the majority of the Darklings, but it also has the side effect of trapping Jessica within the Blue Hour.

Jessica is in a romantic relationship with Jonathan.

Jessica has red hair and green eyes. She is on the cover of The Secret Hour, the first book in the trilogy.

=== Desdemona ("Dess") ===
Desdemona, called Dess for short, is a polymath, which in the books means that she has an inherent aptitude for mathematics, not the usual definition of polymath. Her skill with numbers is seemingly unparalleled. In the books, it is even suggested that ability is so extensive that she can process mathematical data at a greater rate than even a regular computer. Throughout the series, she uses that ability to deduce the "shape" of the Blue Time, which allows her to predict abnormalities in the fabric of time and space within midnight. Along with her skill at mathematics, she is also easily able to locate and identify 13-letter words. As a result, she is the group's expert on anti-Darkling defense and weaponry. Dess's power is useful in both the Blue Time and regular time. Dess has dark brown hair and eyes, with olive skin.

She is the only Midnighter who is not dating someone. She is bothered by it, but it does not consume her.

Dess has an extreme dislike for Mindcaster, Melissa, whom she thinks to be manipulative, nasty, and bordering insanity. In the epilogue, she acknowledges that her hatred towards Melissa has "evaporated."

=== Rex Greene ===
Rex is the only natural-born Midnighter in the group, a Seer, and can read The Lore, which is the history of all Midnighters in Bixby. During the day, he wears glasses. Without them, he can see the other Midnighters and anything touched by Darklings or Slithers in a strange focus, and everything else is blurry. Rex loses his need for glasses at the end of Touching Darkness after the Darklings turn him into one of them, which makes him able to go without them during Blue Noon. He is the self-imposed leader of the group because he is the seer and he enjoys being in control.

After Rex is changed into a Halfling, he begins to struggle with the Darkling forces inside of him. When he returns to school, he begins to view his classmates as prey and notes that they look "delicious." Rex also finds himself hating and being incredibly uncomfortable around all human things and often describes things made by humans as "clever."

Melissa is his best and oldest friend, and he has known her since they were 8.

Over the course of the series, Rex and Melissa develop a romantic relationship.

=== Jonathan Martinez ===
Jonathan is an acrobat. During the Blue Time, Jonathan's personal gravity is reduced, increasing his jumping distance dramatically. Jonathan enjoys the freedom this allows him and in turn dislikes regular time. By making physical contact, Jonathan can share the effects of reduced gravity with both people and objects. Unlike the powers of Dess, Rex, and Melissa, Jonathan's acrobatic skills function only during the Blue Time. That makes his movement back into real time more physically intense, as he must readjust to regular gravity.

He is constantly in trouble with the police and has spent a weekend in police custody after being caught during curfew hours with Jessica. His father has also been to jail, but the specifics are left untold.

Before the events of The Secret Hour, Jonathan rarely associates with any of the other Midnighters because of a personality conflict with Rex.

Over the course of the series, Jonathan develops a romantic relationship with Jessica.

He gave Jessica his mother's bracelet in the book, The Secret Hour.

=== Melissa ===
Melissa has the ability of "Mindcasting." As a mindcaster, she has the powers of telepathy and mental manipulation, which are active both in and out of the Blue Time. She likens the sensation of mind reading to the sense of taste and associates certain behaviours, moods, and thoughts with particular tastes. For most of her life, that ability has proven to be problematic, as she had limited control over the thoughts that she read. Her inability to control her power results in her reading the minds of all those within a certain proximity. That makes her often feel overwhelmed by the overpowering emotions of others. Melissa relishes her times spent in the Blue Time, as the only human thoughts that she must tolerate are those of the other Midnighters. There are a number of factors that can influence Melissa's mindcasting abilities, such as proximity to the subject, physical contact, and wrinkles inherent within space and time.

Melissa's power of mental manipulation allows her to control the thoughts and actions of other individuals she has touched. It is possible for her to do that during regular time, she prefers to do so during the Blue Time because the subject is unaware and cannot resist.

Melissa found Rex when she was 8 by through Bixby on her bare feet and in her Cowgirl PJ's. Throughout the series, Rex refers to her as "Cowgirl." She refers to him as "Loverboy." Later in the series, Rex and Melissa become romantically involved. Melissa then begins to let Rex touch her which allows him to enter her mind and relieve the strenuous pressure caused by the thoughts of others.

It is revealed in the last chapter of Blue Noon that Melissa chooses to leave Rex in Bixby while she and Jonathan go to find the new midnighters of the world.

Melissa is often referred to as rude, uncouth, untrusting, and generally nasty to everyone with the exception of Rex.

While all of the Midnighters except Rex dislike Melissa and tolerate her only because she is useful, Dess expresses the most disapproval of Melissa's cold and manipulative behaviour.

One of Melissa’s abilities is what she calls a "mind rip." Melissa has the ability to enter someone's psyche and force them to go insane to the point that they cannot take care of themselves and are left completely incompetent. She once accidentally did so to Rex's father when he gave Rex beatings and let spiders, Rex's greatest fear, crawl all over him in attempt to make him a "man."

== Darklings and Slithers ==
The darklings and slithers are ancient creatures that were once the dominant species on the planet. Darklings come in many shapes and forms and have the power to change their physical form at will, and slithers are generally serpentine in nature. As humans began to grow in intelligence they hunted the darklings and slithers by exploiting their weakness to new concepts, such as mathematics and language (particularly the number "13" and words with 13 letters), light and heat, and new "technologyé" The technology consisted of anything crafted by humans. Stone spearheads were effective weapons against the Darklings, but as time progressed, the Darklings adapted and grew immune to the effects of simpler technology. However, humans continued to advance and began to forge weapons of other materials such as bronze and iron. As the balance of power began to shift in favor of humans, the darklings created the Blue Hour to escape to by collapsing the twenty-fifth hour of the day.

At the time the novel begins, steel and other alloys, particularly newer and more advanced alloys, are the most common and effective tools used by Midnighters to combat darklings. The Midnighters use those things to defend themselves against the darklings. However, the metals they use must be untouched by darklings or slithers for them to be effective. To maximize the effectiveness of the Midnighters' weapons, they are often given names with 13 letters or names with a number of letters equal to a multiple of 13, and they are sometimes inscribed with certain patterns representing mathematical concepts. The names given to objects can be used only once, but the metal can be used several times, depending on how strong a Darkling it is used against.

== Setting ==
The Midnighters trilogy is set mainly in the town of Bixby, Oklahoma, with reference to the nearby towns of Broken Arrow and Jenks. Particular reference is made to its latitude and longitude: 36°00′00″N 96°00′00″W. It is implied that the Blue Hour occurs only in Bixby and its surrounding areas because 36 (as a multiple of 12) is a number strongly associated with the Darklings, as is 96, and the digits of these numbers added together is 24, another multiple of 12. In reality Bixby, Jenks and Broken Arrow are all real towns in Oklahoma, however they are not located in the formation described in the book, and the point 36 N, 96 W, located in a backyard in a Jenks subdivision, is not where it is described as being.

== Television adaptation ==
The rights to a television adaptation of the Midnighters Trilogy were optioned to The WB. Brad Kern, former executive producer of the TV series Charmed, expressed an interest in helping launch a Midnighters series. Despite Kern's support for the series, Scott Westerfeld has stated on his blog that he is not in favour of Kern's vision of the show, which would have the Midnighters aged into their mid-to-late twenties. Apparently, since then, this idea was abandoned.

As of October 10, 2012, the idea was once again brought up with the creators of Chuck, Chris Fedak and Josh Schwartz. Midnighters received a script commitment, but no television show was produced.

In 2019, WB successor channel The CW was developing a Midnighters television show, which was to be written by Chris Pozzebon and executive produced by Pozzebon and Blindspot producer Martin Gero. Again, no show was produced.
