= List of fictional lesbian characters =

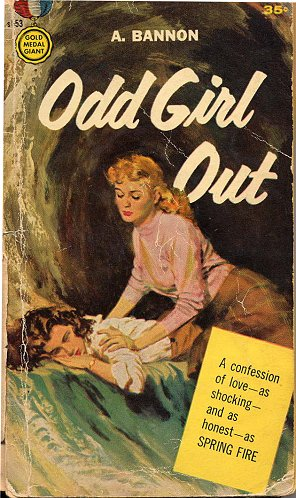
Cover of Odd Girl Out, first novel in The Beebo Brinker Chronicles by Ann Bannon.

This is a list of lesbian characters in fiction, i.e. characters that either self-identify as lesbian or have been identified by outside parties to be lesbian. Listed characters are either recurring characters, cameos, guest stars, or one-off characters. This page does not include lesbian characters in television, animation, or film.

For fictional characters in other parts of the LGBTQ community, see the lists of gay, trans, bisexual, non-binary, pansexual, aromantic, asexual, and intersex characters.

The names are organized alphabetically by surname (i.e. last name), or by single name if the character does not have a surname. If more than two characters are in one entry, the last name of the first character is used.

== Comics and graphic novels ==
Characters	Title	Year	Notes	Country
Anode and Lug	The Transformers	2005–present	Anode and Lug are a transgender lesbian couple in the IDW Transformers comic series.	United States
Arcee	The Transformers	2005–present	The Autobot Arcee is a transgender lesbian within the IDW Transformers comic series.	United States
Donna Cavanagh	The Sandman	1989–2015	Donna and Judy are lovers. After Judy dies, Donna changes her name to Foxglove and starts a relationship with Hazel. Foxglove and Hazel have a child, Alvie, the result of one heterosexual encounter by Hazel.	United States
Judy	The Sandman	1989–2015	Donna and Judy are lovers. After Judy dies, Donna changes her name to Foxglove and starts a relationship with Hazel. Foxglove and Hazel have a child, Alvie, the result of one heterosexual encounter by Hazel.	United States
Hazel McNamara	The Sandman	1989–2015	Donna and Judy are lovers. After Judy dies, Donna changes her name to Foxglove and starts a relationship with Hazel. Foxglove and Hazel have a child, Alvie, the result of one heterosexual encounter by Hazel.	United States
America Chavez	Young Avengers	2005–2014	America Chavez is an openly gay character, who has had relationships with a male personification of the Ultimate Nullifier and a female emergency medical technician named Lisa Halloran.	United States
Tomoyo Daidouji	Cardcaptor Sakura & Cardcaptor Sakura: Clear Card	1996–present	Tomoyo is in love with the protagonist of the show, Sakura. Sakura does not return Tomoyo's feelings. The creators intended for Tomoyo to have romantic feelings for Sakura. At some point, Tomoyo confesses her love to Sakura, but Sakura misunderstands her, thinking she means "love" as a friend, and Tomoyo says that she'll explain when Sakura is older. She simply doesn't have romantic feelings for Tomoyo in particular. Tomoyo's mother, Sonomi, confesses that she was in love with Sakura's mother (despite being her first cousin).	Japan
Sonomi Daidouji	Cardcaptor Sakura & Cardcaptor Sakura: Clear Card	1996–present		Japan
Haruka Tenoh (Sailor Uranus)	Sailor Moon	1991-1997	Haruka and Michiru are in a romantic relationship.	Japan
Michiru Kaioh (Sailor Neptune)	Sailor Moon	1991-1997	Haruka and Michiru are in a romantic relationship.	Japan
Seiya Kou (Sailor Star Fighter)	Sailor Moon	1991-1997	Seiya falls in love with Usagi who does not reciprocate her feelings. In the 90s anime, Seiya transforms into male when she's not in her sailor senshi form, while in the manga shes always female.	Japan
Batwoman	52	2006–2007	The first appearance in this comic book series: 52 #7 (2006) and when DC Comics rebooted their universe with the series 52 in 2006, they reintroduced Batwoman as Kate Kane and identified her as a lesbian, making her the highest profile lesbian in the DC universe.	United States
Batwoman	DC Comics Bombshells & Bombshells United	2015–present	The comics series is set in an alternate reality where DC Comics superheroines are depicted as 1940s pin-up style heroes during World War II. Despite being set in the 1940s, the setting has no era-appropriate homophobia. Kate Kane is a lesbian and lives with her girlfriend, Detective Maggie Sawyer, at the start of the series. Kate Kane and Renee Montoya are revealed to be ex-lovers in issue #45.	United States
Maggie Sawyer	DC Comics Bombshells & Bombshells United	2015–present	The comics series is set in an alternate reality where DC Comics superheroines are depicted as 1940s pin-up style heroes during World War II. Despite being set in the 1940s, the setting has no era-appropriate homophobia. Kate Kane is a lesbian and lives with her girlfriend, Detective Maggie Sawyer, at the start of the series. Kate Kane and Renee Montoya are revealed to be ex-lovers in issue #45.	United States
Renee Montoya	DC Comics Bombshells & Bombshells United	2015–present	The comics series is set in an alternate reality where DC Comics superheroines are depicted as 1940s pin-up style heroes during World War II. Despite being set in the 1940s, the setting has no era-appropriate homophobia. Kate Kane is a lesbian and lives with her girlfriend, Detective Maggie Sawyer, at the start of the series. Kate Kane and Renee Montoya are revealed to be ex-lovers in issue #45.	United States
Karma	New Mutants	1980–present	Karma had been hinted to be a lesbian since her first introduction. In Uncanny X-Men #508 she is shown on panel with another woman.	United States
Kya	The Legend of Korra: Turf Wars	2017–present	Kya's sexuality is not mentioned in the animated series The Legend of Korra. However, in the sequel graphic novel The Legend of Korra: Turf Wars, she is shown to be lesbian and gives advice to Korra and Asami about coming out.	United States
Shuichi Nitori	Wandering Son	2002–2013	The protagonist of Wandering Son, Shu, is a transgender girl. Shu is attracted to and dates women throughout the series and when she officially comes out as a girl, her girlfriend Anna states "I guess this means I'm a lesbian.".	Japan
Anna Suehiro	Wandering Son	2002–2013	The protagonist of Wandering Son, Shu, is a transgender girl. Shu is attracted to and dates women throughout the series and when she officially comes out as a girl, her girlfriend Anna states "I guess this means I'm a lesbian.".	Japan
Hothead Paisan	Hothead Paisan: Homicidal Lesbian Terrorist	1991	Created by Diane DiMassa, Hothead Paisan's presentation was cathartic to lesbians, but so graphically violent that the strip was banned in Canada.	United States
Resine de Poisson	Shiroi Heya no Futari	1971	Set in all-girls Catholic boarding school in France. Shiroi Heya no Futari tells the story of Resine de Poisson and Simone D'Arc. Simone is initially hostile towards the naïve Resine, the two girls gradually grow closer, with Simone going so far as to recite a love poem by Rainer Maria Rilke in front of their class that she dedicates to Resine. Considered the originating work of the yuri genre.	Japan
Simone D'Arc	Shiroi Heya no Futari	1971	Set in all-girls Catholic boarding school in France. Shiroi Heya no Futari tells the story of Resine de Poisson and Simone D'Arc. Simone is initially hostile towards the naïve Resine, the two girls gradually grow closer, with Simone going so far as to recite a love poem by Rainer Maria Rilke in front of their class that she dedicates to Resine. Considered the originating work of the yuri genre.	Japan
Quanxi	Chainsaw Man	2018–2026	Kishibe's former partner in Public Safety and crush, Quanxi is a Chinese devil hunter and one of the assassins sent to steal Denji's heart. She is in a polyamorous relationship with four female Fiends: Long, Pingtsi, Tsugihagi, and Cosmo. Quanxi is regarded to be one of few openly gay characters in mainstream shonen.	Japan
Long	Chainsaw Man	2018–2026	Kishibe's former partner in Public Safety and crush, Quanxi is a Chinese devil hunter and one of the assassins sent to steal Denji's heart. She is in a polyamorous relationship with four female Fiends: Long, Pingtsi, Tsugihagi, and Cosmo. Quanxi is regarded to be one of few openly gay characters in mainstream shonen.	Japan
Pingtsi	Chainsaw Man	2018–2026	Kishibe's former partner in Public Safety and crush, Quanxi is a Chinese devil hunter and one of the assassins sent to steal Denji's heart. She is in a polyamorous relationship with four female Fiends: Long, Pingtsi, Tsugihagi, and Cosmo. Quanxi is regarded to be one of few openly gay characters in mainstream shonen.	Japan
Tsugihagi	Chainsaw Man	2018–2026	Kishibe's former partner in Public Safety and crush, Quanxi is a Chinese devil hunter and one of the assassins sent to steal Denji's heart. She is in a polyamorous relationship with four female Fiends: Long, Pingtsi, Tsugihagi, and Cosmo. Quanxi is regarded to be one of few openly gay characters in mainstream shonen.	Japan
Cosmo	Chainsaw Man	2018–2026	Kishibe's former partner in Public Safety and crush, Quanxi is a Chinese devil hunter and one of the assassins sent to steal Denji's heart. She is in a polyamorous relationship with four female Fiends: Long, Pingtsi, Tsugihagi, and Cosmo. Quanxi is regarded to be one of few openly gay characters in mainstream shonen.	Japan
Roxanne "Roxie" Richter	Scott Pilgrim	2004–2010	The book's protagonist, Ramona Flowers has seven evil exes: six ex-boyfriends and her ex-girlfriend Roxie. Ramona repeatedly corrects him by pointing out that "exes" is correct, not "ex-boyfriends", but she does not actually tell him about her ex-girlfriend until Scott meets Roxie in person. While Ramona says that dating a girl was just a phase, she later spends the night at Roxie's house and they make out offscreen.	Canada
Doctor Aphra	Star Wars: Darth Vader #3	March 25, 2015	A human female archaeologist recruited by Darth Vader, but ends up in prisons of the Empire and the Rebel Alliance. She only shows attraction to other women, such as her lover, Magna Tolvan, Kieron Gillen, the creator of Doctor Aphra, in a conversation with the comic's co-writer, Si Spurrier, and Bria LaVorgna, said, "I normally say Aphra’s a lesbian. I’ve never written her with any romantic interest in men." Gillen also argued that "homophobia...doesn't really exist in the Star Wars universe."	United States
Doctor Aphra	Star Wars: Doctor Aphra	2016-2019	A human female archaeologist recruited by Darth Vader, but ends up in prisons of the Empire and the Rebel Alliance. She only shows attraction to other women, such as her lover, Magna Tolvan, Kieron Gillen, the creator of Doctor Aphra, in a conversation with the comic's co-writer, Si Spurrier, and Bria LaVorgna, said, "I normally say Aphra’s a lesbian. I’ve never written her with any romantic interest in men." Gillen also argued that "homophobia...doesn't really exist in the Star Wars universe."	United States
Doctor Aphra	Doctor Aphra	2020–present	A human female archaeologist recruited by Darth Vader, but ends up in prisons of the Empire and the Rebel Alliance. She only shows attraction to other women, such as her lover, Magna Tolvan, Kieron Gillen, the creator of Doctor Aphra, in a conversation with the comic's co-writer, Si Spurrier, and Bria LaVorgna, said, "I normally say Aphra’s a lesbian. I’ve never written her with any romantic interest in men." Gillen also argued that "homophobia...doesn't really exist in the Star Wars universe."	United States
Holly Robinson	Catwoman vol. 3	2002–2010	Issue where her open lesbian identity begins: Catwoman vol. 3 #1 (2002). Holly Robinson is a friend of Catwoman and was one of the few openly lesbian characters in the early 2000s DC world.	United States
Scandal Savage	Villains United	2005	The Villains United miniseries is the first appearance of Scandal. In this comic, she becomes a member of the Secret Six, says at one point "Lawton, do you know what the word 'lesbian' means?" and later calls Knockout "beloved" as they hug after a battle.	United States
Knockout	Villains United	2005	The Villains United miniseries is the first appearance of Scandal. In this comic, she becomes a member of the Secret Six, says at one point "Lawton, do you know what the word 'lesbian' means?" and later calls Knockout "beloved" as they hug after a battle.	United States
Mo Testa	Dykes to Watch Out For	1983–2008	Mo is a semi-autobiographical representation of the creator Alison Bechdel who started the strip in 1983 because she wanted to see representations of her life that were not available in the media at the time.	United States
Maggie Thrash	Honor Girl	2015	Honor Girl is a graphic novel memoir recounting writer Maggie Thrash's experience of falling in love with an older female camp counselor during a summer all-girls' camp.	United States
Raven Xingtao	Princeless	2012–present	Raven, a character in Princeless and the protagonist in the spin-off Princeless: Raven the Pirate Princess, is a lesbian.	Canada
Raven Xingtao	Princeless: Raven the Pirate Princess	2012–present	Raven, a character in Princeless and the protagonist in the spin-off Princeless: Raven the Pirate Princess, is a lesbian.	Canada
Ymir	Attack on Titan	2009–2021	The official website mentions Ymir is in love with Historia (Krista Lenz) Also at the series panel for Animagic 2014, producer George Wada confirmed that Ymir and Krista are a couple.	Japan

== Literature ==
Characters	Work	Author	Year	Description
Aisling "Ash"	Ash	Malinda Lo	2009	This story tells the classic Cinderella story, but Ash falls in love with a beautiful woman, rather than a prince, named Kaisa, who saves her "from her oppressive new existence." The twist to this story is described by some as important, especially for "those looking for a girl romance."
Kaisa	Ash	Malinda Lo	2009	This story tells the classic Cinderella story, but Ash falls in love with a beautiful woman, rather than a prince, named Kaisa, who saves her "from her oppressive new existence." The twist to this story is described by some as important, especially for "those looking for a girl romance."
Alice	Bury Our Bones in the Midnight Soil	V.E. Schwab	2025	This novel follows three women, who all become vampires, across three different timelines. María is seduced by a mysterious women in the 1530s, and later begins a relationship with Charlotte in the 1800s. Alice is a Scottish lesbian attending Harvard University in 2019, who becomes accidentally entangled in Charlotte and María's dramas.
Charlotte	Bury Our Bones in the Midnight Soil	V.E. Schwab	2025	This novel follows three women, who all become vampires, across three different timelines. María is seduced by a mysterious women in the 1530s, and later begins a relationship with Charlotte in the 1800s. Alice is a Scottish lesbian attending Harvard University in 2019, who becomes accidentally entangled in Charlotte and María's dramas.
María	Bury Our Bones in the Midnight Soil	V.E. Schwab	2025	This novel follows three women, who all become vampires, across three different timelines. María is seduced by a mysterious women in the 1530s, and later begins a relationship with Charlotte in the 1800s. Alice is a Scottish lesbian attending Harvard University in 2019, who becomes accidentally entangled in Charlotte and María's dramas.
Nancy "Nan" Astley	Tipping the Velvet	Sarah Waters	1998	Nan has sexual/romantic relationships with Florence and Diana; all three have also been with other women.
Florence Banner	Tipping the Velvet	Sarah Waters	1998	Nan has sexual/romantic relationships with Florence and Diana; all three have also been with other women.
Diana Leathaby	Tipping the Velvet	Sarah Waters	1998	Nan has sexual/romantic relationships with Florence and Diana; all three have also been with other women.
Therese Belivet	The Price of Salt (a.k.a. Carol)	Patricia Highsmith	1952	A married woman, Carol Aird, meets and falls in love with Therese Belivet, which results in her sexuality being used against her and relinquishing custody of her daughter, with Therese comes out to herself after meeting Carol, while Abby is also a lesbian character. Later made into a 2015 Hollywood film.
Abby Gerhard	The Price of Salt (a.k.a. Carol)	Patricia Highsmith	1952	A married woman, Carol Aird, meets and falls in love with Therese Belivet, which results in her sexuality being used against her and relinquishing custody of her daughter, with Therese comes out to herself after meeting Carol, while Abby is also a lesbian character. Later made into a 2015 Hollywood film.
Berdine	Blood of the Fold &Temple of the Winds	Terry Goodkind	1996 & 1997	In these books, the two Mord-Sith are in a relationship with each other. Berdine comes out as a lesbian in the third book of this series and says she loves Raina. This was later turned into a TV series, The Legend of the Seeker.
Raina	Blood of the Fold &Temple of the Winds	Terry Goodkind	1996 & 1997	In these books, the two Mord-Sith are in a relationship with each other. Berdine comes out as a lesbian in the third book of this series and says she loves Raina. This was later turned into a TV series, The Legend of the Seeker.
Beebo Brinker	The Beebo Brinker Chronicles	Ann Bannon	1957-1960	These books focus on gay and lesbian love, sexual adventure, with a positive, "yet still complicated look at lesbian relationships," in all five of the books in this series. In the first book, Odd Girl Out, a college girl named Laura gets seduced by Beth, and in the next book, I Am A Woman, Laura goes to a bar and meets a butch lesbian, Beebo Brinker, and talks about coming out to her father. In the following book, Women In The Shadows, the relationship between Laura and Beebo continues, while Laura's first girlfriend returns in Journey To A Woman, leading to a "drama-laden lesbian love triangle" of Beebo, Beth, and Laura. In the next book, Beebo Brinker looks back to the formative years of Beebo.
Beth Ayers (Note: Also named Cullison)	The Beebo Brinker Chronicles	Ann Bannon	1957-1960	
Laura Landon	The Beebo Brinker Chronicles	Ann Bannon	1957-1960	
Molly Bolt	Rubyfruit Jungle	Rita Mae Brown	1973	Molly has numerous romantic and sexual relationships with other women. In this novel, she confronts the "hypocrisies of both heterosexual and homosexual societies."
Calixte	Strange the Dreamer series	Laini Taylor	2017-2018	Calixte and Tzara are in a long-term lesbian relationship with each other at the start of the series. Thyon Nero has never been romantically or sexually attracted to a woman, but finds himself drawn to Ruza, who seems to reciprocate his interest, making them both gay or in Ruza's case at least bisexual.
Tzara	Strange the Dreamer series	Laini Taylor	2017-2018	Calixte and Tzara are in a long-term lesbian relationship with each other at the start of the series. Thyon Nero has never been romantically or sexually attracted to a woman, but finds himself drawn to Ruza, who seems to reciprocate his interest, making them both gay or in Ruza's case at least bisexual.
Carmilla	Carmilla	Sheridan Le Fanu	1872	Carmilla, published as part of the book, In a Glass Darkly, is considered the first lesbian vampire story. In this story, Laura, who lives with her father, meets Carmilla, and they form a close relationship, with Laura becoming ill as Carmilla draws nourishment from her.
Clarissa Dalloway	Mrs Dalloway	Virginia Woolf	1925	This novel tells the day in the life of Clarissa Dalloway, a fictional woman in post–war, and she is strongly attracted to Sally Seton, with both sharing a kiss. Clarissa also recognizes that Septimus dies without revealing his homosexuality, perceiving his failure to speak out as "protecting her private lesbian passion," while Doris later encourages Clarissa to name, at least privately, her "lesbian desires."
Doris Kilman	Mrs Dalloway	Virginia Woolf	1925	This novel tells the day in the life of Clarissa Dalloway, a fictional woman in post–war, and she is strongly attracted to Sally Seton, with both sharing a kiss. Clarissa also recognizes that Septimus dies without revealing his homosexuality, perceiving his failure to speak out as "protecting her private lesbian passion," while Doris later encourages Clarissa to name, at least privately, her "lesbian desires."
Anne Damer	Life Mask	Emma Donoghue	2004	This book is set in late 18th century London, telling the story of three women caught in a love triangle, one of whom is Anna, whose "lesbian side" is not realized until the end of the book.
Elinor "Lakey" Eastlake	The Group	Mary McCarthy	1954	Elinar is a lesbian, and graduate from Vassar College in 1933, with the lives of the stories proatgonists involving the men in their lives. The Baroness is her lesbian lover, which her fellow seven female graduates realize when she returned from Europe. It was later adapted into a film in 1966.
Lucy Farinelli	Kay Scarpetta novels	Patricia Cornwell	1994–2003	Lucy has romantic relationships and casual sexual encounters with other women. Lucy is not well accepted due to her suspected sexual orientation, has occasional one-night stands, mostly with women and occasionally with men, but she is seduced by Carrie Grethen, early in her career, a relationship which haunts her and those close to her across several books.
Stephen Gordon	The Well of Loneliness	Radclyffe Hall	1928	This book, a candid novel about "coming to terms with a lesbian identity," was challenged as obscene, under the Obscene Publications Act 1857, for its "frank portrayal of lesbianism." Although the book has no language that is explicitly sexual, the lesbian themes were seen as a threat to the existing social order, seen as unpalatable, remained banned until 1959 when the Obscene Publications Act was amended, and was published in the U.S. in April 1929 when courts agreed that "lesbianism in and of itself was neither obscene nor illegal," meaning the book wasn't either.
Valérie Seymour	The Well of Loneliness	Radclyffe Hall	1928	
Joan Gilling	The Bell Jar	Sylvia Plath	1963	The novel has a central relationship between Joan and Esther, and it addresses the question of socially acceptable identity, examining Esther's "quest to forge her own identity, to be herself rather than what others expect her to be" while highlighting the problems with oppressive patriarchal society in mid-20th-century America. There was the 1979 film adaption of the book, and a lawsuit by Jane V. Anderson claiming that she was not a lesbian and didn't have a relationship with Sylvia Path.
Esther Greenwood	The Bell Jar	Sylvia Plath	1963	The novel has a central relationship between Joan and Esther, and it addresses the question of socially acceptable identity, examining Esther's "quest to forge her own identity, to be herself rather than what others expect her to be" while highlighting the problems with oppressive patriarchal society in mid-20th-century America. There was the 1979 film adaption of the book, and a lawsuit by Jane V. Anderson claiming that she was not a lesbian and didn't have a relationship with Sylvia Path.
Rosemary Harper	The Long Way to a Small, Angry Planet	Becky Chambers	2015	Rosemary Harper and Sissix are either lesbians or bisexuals as the two women enter a relationship with each other over the course of the novel. In her review, Casey Stepaniuk describes the book as "Star Trek but with lesbians and more aliens."
Sissix	The Long Way to a Small, Angry Planet	Becky Chambers	2015	Rosemary Harper and Sissix are either lesbians or bisexuals as the two women enter a relationship with each other over the course of the novel. In her review, Casey Stepaniuk describes the book as "Star Trek but with lesbians and more aliens."
Hurley	The Adventure Zone	Carey Pietch	2018–present	In the third graphic novel, Petals to the Metal, there are two secondary female characters named Hurley and Sloane who have a relationship/feelings for each other. The Hurley-Sloane lesbian couple survived to the end of the story, surviving a near-death experience.
Sloane	The Adventure Zone	Carey Pietch	2018–present	In the third graphic novel, Petals to the Metal, there are two secondary female characters named Hurley and Sloane who have a relationship/feelings for each other. The Hurley-Sloane lesbian couple survived to the end of the story, surviving a near-death experience.
Ijeoma	Under the Udala Trees	Chinelo Okparanta	2015	Ijeoma and Amina fall in love with each other as children and keep loving each other way into adulthood.
Amina	Under the Udala Trees	Chinelo Okparanta	2015	Ijeoma and Amina fall in love with each other as children and keep loving each other way into adulthood.
Wilma Irrling	Die Wilden Hühner und die Liebe	Cornelia Funke	2003	Wilma comes out as lesbian to her friends. She falls in love with a girl from her theatre group who is called Leonie.
Leonie	Die Wilden Hühner und die Liebe	Cornelia Funke	2003	Wilma comes out as lesbian to her friends. She falls in love with a girl from her theatre group who is called Leonie.
Ashlinn Järnheim	Godsgrave (Note: Part of The Nevernight Chronicle series)	Jay Kristoff	2017	Mia Corvere is an infamous assassin and fugitive slave fleeing from the Blades of the Red Church and Luminatii legion, with her family wanting her to die and her mentor in hands of her foes. She works with many individuals, like her lover, Ashlinn, to find out the "final answer to the riddle of her life."
Holland Jeager	Keeping You a Secret	Julie Anne Peters	2003	In this coming out novel, Holland is intrigued by a student transferring to her school who "wants to start a Lesbigay club at school." In the process, Holland faces homophobia, and begins a relationship with Cece, adjusting to her new sexuality quickly.
Cece	Keeping You a Secret	Julie Anne Peters	2003	In this coming out novel, Holland is intrigued by a student transferring to her school who "wants to start a Lesbigay club at school." In the process, Holland faces homophobia, and begins a relationship with Cece, adjusting to her new sexuality quickly.
Jeanette	Oranges Are Not the Only Fruit	Jeanette Winterson	1985	This book is a coming-of-age story about a lesbian girl named Jeanette who grows up in an English Pentecostal community. Key themes of the book include transition from youth to adulthood, complex family relationships, same-sex relationships, and religion. A television adaptation of the book was made and aired by the BBC in 1990, starring Charlotte Coleman and Geraldine McEwan, which won the Prix Italia in 1991.
Jo	Ukiah Oregon series	Wen Spencer	2001–2004	In this series of books, Jo and Lara are the mothers of Ukiah Oregon, the story's protagonist. In the first book, Alien Taste, it is revealed that Ukriah was raised first by wolves, then by Jo and Lara. Jo and Lara also appear in the three other books in the series, Tainted Trail, Bitter Waters, and Dog Warrior, but only as minor characters.
Lara	Ukiah Oregon series	Wen Spencer	2001–2004	In this series of books, Jo and Lara are the mothers of Ukiah Oregon, the story's protagonist. In the first book, Alien Taste, it is revealed that Ukriah was raised first by wolves, then by Jo and Lara. Jo and Lara also appear in the three other books in the series, Tainted Trail, Bitter Waters, and Dog Warrior, but only as minor characters.
Annie Kenyon	Annie on My Mind	Nancy Garden	1982	This book is a retrospect by Liza, remembering her first semester at MIT, how she met Annie, struggled to recognize her lesbian identity, and they reaffirm their love for each other on the phone at the end of the book. Due to these themes, religious fundamentalists burned a copy of the book, a Kansas superintendent removed it from school libraries, and a lawsuit ensued, with a judge ruling on the side of the ACLU, ordering the book to be returned to the libraries shelves. The book is well-regarded as a "canonical lesbian-coming-of-age novel."
Liza Winthrop	Annie on My Mind	Nancy Garden	1982	
Keren	Arrows of the Queen	Mercedes Lackey	1987	Keren, a minor character, is life bonded to Ylsa and then Sherrill.
Daja Kisubo	The Will of the Empress	Tamora Pierce	2005	Daja is a main character who realizes she is gay and begins a relationship with a woman named Rizu throughout the course of the novel, while Lark is a mostly off-screen character in a long-term relationship with another woman. Lark appears more in other books within Pierce's Emelan universe. Daja's relationship in this book ends badly. She is forced to choose between Rizu and her chosen family; she chooses the latter.
Rizuka fa Dalach "Rizu"	The Will of the Empress	Tamora Pierce	2005	Daja is a main character who realizes she is gay and begins a relationship with a woman named Rizu throughout the course of the novel, while Lark is a mostly off-screen character in a long-term relationship with another woman. Lark appears more in other books within Pierce's Emelan universe. Daja's relationship in this book ends badly. She is forced to choose between Rizu and her chosen family; she chooses the latter.
Lark	The Will of the Empress	Tamora Pierce	2005	Daja is a main character who realizes she is gay and begins a relationship with a woman named Rizu throughout the course of the novel, while Lark is a mostly off-screen character in a long-term relationship with another woman. Lark appears more in other books within Pierce's Emelan universe. Daja's relationship in this book ends badly. She is forced to choose between Rizu and her chosen family; she chooses the latter.
Renee LaRoche	Along the Journey River	Carole LaFavor	1996	In this novel, originally published in 1996, and re-released in 2017, it is the first detective novel to have "an openly out Indigenous lesbian," the protagonist, Renee.
Anna Lightwood	The Shadowhunter Chronicles	Cassandra Clare	2007–present	Anna is a genderqueer lesbian, as confirmed by author Cassandra Clare, who has had many lovers but has never truly gotten over her first love, Ariadne Bridgestock, a closeted lesbian who entered a lavender engagement with Charles, becoming his fiancé. Anna also, according to the author, outright rejects the gender binary but uses female pronouns because the book is set in 1903.
Ariadne Bridgestock	The Shadowhunter Chronicles	Cassandra Clare	2007–present	Anna is a genderqueer lesbian, as confirmed by author Cassandra Clare, who has had many lovers but has never truly gotten over her first love, Ariadne Bridgestock, a closeted lesbian who entered a lavender engagement with Charles, becoming his fiancé. Anna also, according to the author, outright rejects the gender binary but uses female pronouns because the book is set in 1903.
Helen Blackthorn	The Shadowhunter Chronicles	Cassandra Clare	2007–present	Anna is a genderqueer lesbian, as confirmed by author Cassandra Clare, who has had many lovers but has never truly gotten over her first love, Ariadne Bridgestock, a closeted lesbian who entered a lavender engagement with Charles, becoming his fiancé. Anna also, according to the author, outright rejects the gender binary but uses female pronouns because the book is set in 1903.
Aline Penhallow	The Shadowhunter Chronicles	Cassandra Clare	2007–present	Anna is a genderqueer lesbian, as confirmed by author Cassandra Clare, who has had many lovers but has never truly gotten over her first love, Ariadne Bridgestock, a closeted lesbian who entered a lavender engagement with Charles, becoming his fiancé. Anna also, according to the author, outright rejects the gender binary but uses female pronouns because the book is set in 1903.
Maiju Montevideo; Claude Singapore	Carnival	Elizabeth Bear	2006	This story revolves around two spies sent to steal alien tech from Amazonia, a "planet ruled by man-enslaving lesbians" like Claude and Maiju. Additionally, the two spies, Vincent and Michelangelo are homosexuals from a world with "regressive and repressive mores."
Moff Delian Mors	Star Wars: Lords of the Sith	Paul S. Kemp	2015	Moff, the first LGBT character in the Star Wars canon, was introduced in this book. (Note: There were same gender relationships in Star Wars: The Old Republic online roleplaying game after an outcry, introduced in 2015.) She is an Imperial officer who makes mistakes, is very capable, and happens to be a lesbian as well, with those who included it saying that Star Wars should be diverse, apart from stories about "straight, white males." Reviewers for the New York Daily News stated her sexuality is not a major concern in the novel, suggesting that "homophobia isn't an issue in the Empire," and something the Imperial Army doesn't worry about, even as they fight rebels.
Cassie Peskin-Suso; Nadine Suso	Simon vs. the Homo Sapiens Agenda	Becky Albertalli	2015	Abby's cousin Cassie Peskin-Suso, a principal character in the sequel novel The Upside of Unrequited, is a lesbian and Mina is her pansexual girlfriend while Cassie also has two mothers Nadine, who is a lesbian, and Patty, who is bisexual.
Margaret Prior	Affinity	Sarah Waters	1999	Margaret also called "Peggy" and "Aurora" is an unmarried woman from an upper-class family. She becomes a visitor at a prison and meets Selina. Margaret is a prisoner in her life being "dictated by gender rules and societal expectations, as Selina is in her physical cell." This novel is set in a women's prison in London, explores the "Victorian world of spiritualism," and won the Somerset Maugham Award for Lesbian and Gay Fiction. Like her first novel, Affinity contains overarching lesbian themes and was acclaimed by critics on its publication. Later it was turned into a feature film.
Selina Dawes	Affinity	Sarah Waters	1999	
Imogene "Idgie" Threadgoode	Fried Green Tomatoes at the Whistle Stop Cafe	Fannie Flagg	1998	This novel weaves together the past and the present through the blossoming friendship between Evelyn Couch, a middle-aged housewife, and Ninny Threadgoode, an elderly woman who lives in a nursing home, while her sister-in-law, Idgie, and her friend, Ruth, ran a café. Idgie is a lesbian and has a long-term romantic relationship with another woman, and sexual encounters with one other woman. Although it is not explicitly labeled as a lesbian relationship, every resident both knows about and accepts Idgie and Ruth's relationship, making lesbianism a theme in the novel while in the film adaptation, a story of Southern female friendship and love, Ruth had been in love with Buddy Threadgoode, Idgie's brother.
Aud Torvingen	The Blue Place	Nicola Griffith	2007	Aud Torvingen, an 18-year-old coming to the U.S., who is the daughter of a rich diplomat, rents an apartment near Atlanta, and becomes an Atlanta cop, but falls into passionate encounters. One of these encounters is with Julia. She remains a protagonist in the book's two sequels, Stay and Always, and becomes "one of the most human and intriguing lesbians in crime fiction."
Jaret Tyler	Happy Endings Are All Alike	Sandra Scoppettone	1978	This young adult book is the first one with a "clearly lesbian main character," named Jaret Taylor who comes out in the book's first line: "Even though Jaret Tyler had no guilt or shame about her love affair with Peggy Danziger she knew there were plenty of people in this world who would put it down." Jaret, a future lawyer, endures hardship and discrimination but remains strong even as Peggy, her girlfriend, "wavers in the face of family and small-town prejudices." Scoppettone would go on to write a popular mystery novel series featuring a lesbian detective named Lauren Laurano.
Peggy Danziger	Happy Endings Are All Alike	Sandra Scoppettone	1978	
Clodagh Unwin	A Village Affair	Joanna Trollope	1989	In this story, Alice Meadows questions her identity, having an affair with a lesbian woman named Clodagh Unwin, while she remains married, with her awakening depending on "a heart-wrenching choice between her lover and her family."
Clarissa Vaughan	The Hours	Michael Cunningham	1998	In this novel, which has strong parallels with Virginia Woolf's Mrs Dalloway, Clarissa rejects a relationship with Richard, a gay man, for the love of her life, Sally, who is invigorated by this love. Louis is also Richard's former lover, with Richard later taking his own life, while Clarissa comes to a full realization of her own identity.
Sally	The Hours	Michael Cunningham	1998	In this novel, which has strong parallels with Virginia Woolf's Mrs Dalloway, Clarissa rejects a relationship with Richard, a gay man, for the love of her life, Sally, who is invigorated by this love. Louis is also Richard's former lover, with Richard later taking his own life, while Clarissa comes to a full realization of her own identity.
Patience White	Patience and Sarah	Isabel Miller	1969	This book, which captures "Lesbian-feminist consciousness" in the U.S. in the 1960s, is not only a love story of Patience and Sarah but also became important in the "lesbian literary-political tradition," with Miller's experience as a woman and lesbian shaping the book itself.
Sarah Dowling	Patience and Sarah	Isabel Miller	1969	This book, which captures "Lesbian-feminist consciousness" in the U.S. in the 1960s, is not only a love story of Patience and Sarah but also became important in the "lesbian literary-political tradition," with Miller's experience as a woman and lesbian shaping the book itself.
Felicity Worthington	Gemma Doyle Trilogy	Libba Bray	2003	Felicity is an "alpha girl," who becomes friends with the protagonist, Gemma, and has an "obsession with power," and has a tortured lesbian relationship with Pippa Felicity is revealed to be either bisexual or a lesbian (although most likely lesbian as she seemed to use men as a cover-up) in the last book when she shares a passionate kiss with Pippa, before leaving the corrupt Pippa behind forever.

== Video games ==
Characters	Title	Year	Notes	Developer
A ghost couple	Kindred Spirits on the Roof	2012	In the English release of this Japanese visual novel, the main character Toomi Yuna helps a female ghost couple, create other lesbian couples at her school. This game is notable for being the first erotic visual novel released on Steam not to be censored.	Liar-soft
Other couples	Kindred Spirits on the Roof	2012	In the English release of this Japanese visual novel, the main character Toomi Yuna helps a female ghost couple, create other lesbian couples at her school. This game is notable for being the first erotic visual novel released on Steam not to be censored.	Liar-soft
Asellus	SaGa Frontier	1997	This Japanese role-playing game features a female main character named Asellus who was infused with mystical blood that causes her to be highly attractive to other women.	Square
Athena	Borderlands: The Pre-Sequel	2014	In Borderlands: The Pre-Sequel (2014) the playable character Athena and the supporting character Janey Springs are lesbian. Janey repeatedly flirts with Athena, causing her to become embarrassed.	2K Australia & Gearbox Software
Sophia	Borderlands: The Pre-Sequel	2014	In Borderlands: The Pre-Sequel (2014) the playable character Athena and the supporting character Janey Springs are lesbian. Janey repeatedly flirts with Athena, causing her to become embarrassed.	
Himiko Yumeno	Danganronpa V3: Killing Harmony	2017	This visual novel has the player meeting two young adult girls named Tenko Chabashira and Himiko Yumeno who are almost always near each other. While at first, they appear to be merely close friends, Tenko develops a large crush on Himiko heavily showing they are lesbians.	Spike Chunsoft
Tenko Chabashira	Danganronpa V3: Killing Harmony	2017	This visual novel has the player meeting two young adult girls named Tenko Chabashira and Himiko Yumeno who are almost always near each other. While at first, they appear to be merely close friends, Tenko develops a large crush on Himiko heavily showing they are lesbians.	Spike Chunsoft
Abigail Black	Clive Barker's Jericho	2007	Lt. Abigail Black, a telekinetic sniper and playable character, is confirmed to be lesbian in this Spanish first-person shooter and survival horror game.	MercurySteam & Alchemic Productions
Caithe	Guild Wars 2	2012	This MMORPG game includes the sylvari race of plant-like humanoids who don't reproduce sexually. As such, they do not base their relationships upon reproduction, but rather love, sensuality, and finding beauty in one another. Caithe and Faolain are minor characters, two female sylvari in a lesbian relationship. Eladus and Dagdar are two young male sylvari in a gay relationship. The player is able to encounter and save Eladus and Dagdar from the Knight Bercilak the Green in an optional quest.	ArenaNet
Faolain	Guild Wars 2	2012	This MMORPG game includes the sylvari race of plant-like humanoids who don't reproduce sexually. As such, they do not base their relationships upon reproduction, but rather love, sensuality, and finding beauty in one another. Caithe and Faolain are minor characters, two female sylvari in a lesbian relationship. Eladus and Dagdar are two young male sylvari in a gay relationship. The player is able to encounter and save Eladus and Dagdar from the Knight Bercilak the Green in an optional quest.	ArenaNet
Crystal	Dead Rising 2	2010	It's hinted that two minor villains, twin sisters Crystal and Amber Bailey, are in an incestuous lesbian relationship in this Canadian survival horror and beat 'em up game.	Blue Castle Games
Amber Bailey	Dead Rising 2	2010	It's hinted that two minor villains, twin sisters Crystal and Amber Bailey, are in an incestuous lesbian relationship in this Canadian survival horror and beat 'em up game.	Blue Castle Games
Ellie	The Last of Us	2013	In The Last of Us (2013), Ellie is one of the main characters and Riley is sometimes mentioned. In the DLC prequel The Last of Us: Left Behind (2014), players control Ellie as she spends time with Riley, and it is implied Ellie has feelings for Riley, culminating in a kiss between them near the climax. The developers Naughty Dog later confirmed they have romantic feelings for each other and the writer for Ellie's character, Neil Druckmann, said he wrote her to be gay.	Naughty Dog
Riley Abel	The Last of Us	2013	In The Last of Us (2013), Ellie is one of the main characters and Riley is sometimes mentioned. In the DLC prequel The Last of Us: Left Behind (2014), players control Ellie as she spends time with Riley, and it is implied Ellie has feelings for Riley, culminating in a kiss between them near the climax. The developers Naughty Dog later confirmed they have romantic feelings for each other and the writer for Ellie's character, Neil Druckmann, said he wrote her to be gay.	Naughty Dog
Elster	Signalis	2022	Elster and Ariane Yeong are a lesbian couple in the survival-horror video game Signalis.	rose-engine
Ariane Yeong	Signalis	2022	Elster and Ariane Yeong are a lesbian couple in the survival-horror video game Signalis.	rose-engine
Garnet	Steven Universe: Save the Light	2017	Garnet (composed of two Gems in a relationship, Ruby and Sapphire), and Pearl, are lesbian characters in this action-adventure, and role-playing game.	Grumpyface Studios
Pearl	Steven Universe: Save the Light	2017	Garnet (composed of two Gems in a relationship, Ruby and Sapphire), and Pearl, are lesbian characters in this action-adventure, and role-playing game.	Grumpyface Studios
Steph Gingrich	Life Is Strange: Before the Storm	2015-2017	Steph has a crush on Rachel and can mention it to Chloe in episode 2. Her voice actress, Katy Bentz, later confirmed during a Reddit AMA that Steph is a lesbian.	Deck Nine
Tracker McDyke	Caper in the Castro	1988	A murder mystery problem solving and adventure game for Apple Mac computers written in the HyperCard language, distributed on underground gay bulletin boards, starring the lesbian detective Tracker McDyke. C. M. Ralph, who wrote the game, later released a straightwashed version called "Murder on Main Street" and published by Heizer Software.	C. M. Ralph
Fiona	The Longest Journey	1999	This computer game features Fiona and Mickey, a lesbian landlady and her long-time lover. The game also features a gay cop. While the game used a futuristic Blade Runner type setting, the gay characters are seen as normal and well adjusted secondary characters.	Funcom
Mickey	The Longest Journey	1999	This computer game features Fiona and Mickey, a lesbian landlady and her long-time lover. The game also features a gay cop. While the game used a futuristic Blade Runner type setting, the gay characters are seen as normal and well adjusted secondary characters.	Funcom
Kendall Flowers	Don't Take It Personally, Babe, It Just Ain't Your Story	2011	Kendall and Charlotte have recently broken up as of the start of this Canadian visual novel game.	Love Conquers All Games
Charlotte Grewal	Don't Take It Personally, Babe, It Just Ain't Your Story	2011	Kendall and Charlotte have recently broken up as of the start of this Canadian visual novel game.	Love Conquers All Games
Juhani	Star Wars: Knights of the Old Republic	2003	The party member Juhani is lesbian, though bugged coding on the initial release allowed her to be attracted to the player character regardless of gender. In subsequent patches, she reverts to same-sex preferences. She and another female Jedi were also heavily implied to be lovers. This would make Juhani the first known gay character in the Star Wars universe.	BioWare
Another female Jedi	Star Wars: Knights of the Old Republic	2003	The party member Juhani is lesbian, though bugged coding on the initial release allowed her to be attracted to the player character regardless of gender. In subsequent patches, she reverts to same-sex preferences. She and another female Jedi were also heavily implied to be lovers. This would make Juhani the first known gay character in the Star Wars universe.	BioWare
Kassandra	Assassin's Creed Odyssey	2018	The player may choose to play as either Alexios or Kassandra; a pair of siblings. The game presents both opposite-sex and same-sex relationship options for the player character. They are potentially lesbian, gay, or bisexual.	Ubisoft Montreal
Alexios	Assassin's Creed Odyssey	2018	The player may choose to play as either Alexios or Kassandra; a pair of siblings. The game presents both opposite-sex and same-sex relationship options for the player character. They are potentially lesbian, gay, or bisexual.	Ubisoft Montreal
Paige	The Walking Dead: Michonne	2016	Paige has feelings for her friend Samantha.	Telltale Games
Melody	Angry Birds 2	2015	Melody is a brown potoo with the power to inhale objects and spit them back out. In the pride-themed "better together" microtransaction, the player can buy her an outfit with the colors of the lesbian pride flag.	Rovio Entertainment
Vivien Pentreath	Moonmist	1986	In one of the possible storylines, it is revealed that Vivien, a friend of Lord Jack, was in a relationship with his former fiancée, Deirdre, before her apparent suicide and was jealous that she chose Lord Jack over her in this interactive fiction.	Infocom
Seiko Shinohara	Corpse Party: BloodCovered	2006	Seiko is shown to have romantic feelings for her best friend, Naomi Nakashima in this Japanese survival horror, adventure, and dōjin soft game.	Team GrisGris
Hiyu Shinosaki	Bokuhime Project	2020	Hiyu, a supporting character attending the same school as the protagonist, is attracted to women in this Japanese adventure game.	Nippon Ichi Software
Sole Survivor	Fallout 4	2015	The player character, "Sole Survivor", can romance their companions, regardless of their sex.	Bethesda Game Studios
Tiny Tina	Borderlands 2	2012	Tiny Tina confesses that she likes Maya and asks if she likes her in turn. It was confirmed by lead writer Anthony Burch on his ask.fm that she is lesbian. Also, during the production of the DLC Mr. Torgue's Campaign of Carnage (2012), it was planned to depict Tiny Tina having a crush on Moxxi, but the dialogue concerning this was ultimately deleted before the DLC was released. However, in Borderlands 3, echo logs reveal that she had been in relationships with both men and women.	Gearbox Software
Two female lovers	The Dagger of Amon Ra	1992	This adventure game features a woman from a small town who gets a job for a New York paper in the 1920s. Two of the women she meets are involved in a secret love affair.	Sierra On-Line
Various girls	A Kiss for the Petals	2006–2016	A series of adult yuri visual novels.	Fuguriya
Teachers	A Kiss for the Petals	2006–2016	A series of adult yuri visual novels.	Fuguriya
Nurses	A Kiss for the Petals	2006–2016	A series of adult yuri visual novels.	Fuguriya
Various girls	Nurse Love Addiction	2015	This is a Japanese yuri game, in the visual novel genre, centered around lesbian nursing school students.	Kogado Studio

== Webcomics ==
Characters	Title	Year	Notes
Donna	Bruno	1996–2007	In this Christopher Baldwin webcomic, Bruno, a bisexual, and free-spirited woman, and later becomes involves with Sophia, who "has male and female lovers within the bounds of a polyamorous relationship." The webcomic also features a trans woman named Judi, with Baldwin offering "brief flashes inside Judi's private sexual life," even though most of the main characters don't know she is trans. In one comic, Bruno admits her bisexuality, and in others, she goes on a date with Frank, has a one-night-stand with Patricia, and sleeps with her friend Donna. In the later case, Bruno and Donna have a passionate relationship, but due to Bruno's alcoholism and somewhat turbulent personality, they break up. After the breakup, Bruno expresses interest in a boy and Donna is seen with a new girlfriend.
Gyp	Bucko	2011–2012	This Jeff Parker and Erika Moen webcomic features an "uninhibited" lesbian main character, Gyp. who is the housemate of the protagonist, Rich "Bucko" Richardson.
Jane	Jane's World	1998–2018	In this webcomic by Paige Braddock, most of the central characters, including the titular Jane, are lesbians.
Other characters	Jane's World	1998–2018	In this webcomic by Paige Braddock, most of the central characters, including the titular Jane, are lesbians.
Rose Lalonde	Homestuck	2009-2016	In this webcomic by Andrew Hussie, Rose Lalonde is a lesbian human who eventually dates Kanaya Maryam, a lesbian troll.
Mal	Lumberjanes	2014–2020	This series, created by Grace Ellis and Shannon Watters, (Note: Apart from writing by Ellis and Watters, ND Stevenson, Kat Leyh, and Faith Erin Hicks wrote stories for this series.)features two campers, Mal and Molly, who discover they have mutual crushes for each other, with their friends accepting their relationship.
Molly	Lumberjanes	2014–2020	This series, created by Grace Ellis and Shannon Watters,features two campers, Mal and Molly, who discover they have mutual crushes for each other, with their friends accepting their relationship.
Malori	Mage & Demon Queen	2018 – 2023	This webcomic by Kuru, (Note: Also known as Color LES) is focused on Malori, a young woman and mage, who is told to kill the Demon Queen, Velverosa, but is deeply in love with her, with the queer relationship between them a central part of the story. In the second chapter of the comic, Princess Lenora and Malori go on a date in Folstina. It is also shown that Lenora has a crush on Malori.
Velverosa	Mage & Demon Queen	2018 – 2023	This webcomic by Kuru, is focused on Malori, a young woman and mage, who is told to kill the Demon Queen, Velverosa, but is deeply in love with her, with the queer relationship between them a central part of the story. In the second chapter of the comic, Princess Lenora and Malori go on a date in Folstina. It is also shown that Lenora has a crush on Malori.
Lenora	Mage & Demon Queen	2018 – 2023	This webcomic by Kuru, is focused on Malori, a young woman and mage, who is told to kill the Demon Queen, Velverosa, but is deeply in love with her, with the queer relationship between them a central part of the story. In the second chapter of the comic, Princess Lenora and Malori go on a date in Folstina. It is also shown that Lenora has a crush on Malori.
Kabi Nagata	My Lesbian Experience With Loneliness	2016	This autobiographical manga is by a lesbian author named by Kabi Nagata.
Nimona	Nimona	2012–2015	ND Stevenson, the author of this webcomic, described Nimona, the series protagonist, as a person who is stocky, wears pink but is "still very kind of butch," referring to a woman with masculine traits, beyond what is considered typical of a tomboy, specifically a lesbian identity.
Mo Testa	Dykes to Watch Out For	1983–2008	This webcomic by Alison Bechdel features multiple lesbian characters, specifically a lesbian feminist named Mo Testa, a drag king named Lois MacGiver who dates Jasmine and the mother of a trans teen: Janis (whose birth name is Jonas), and a self-described "bisexual lesbian" named Sparrow Pidgeon (whose birth name is Prudence). There's also the college girlfriend of Mo (Clarice Clifford), the married partner of Clarice (Toni Ortiz), the current lover of Mo (Dr. Sydney Krukowski), and a Jewish lesbian named Thea who was Sydney's lover in college, along with other central characters, like Jezanna and Audrey who are in a relationship, and Harriet, Mo's ex-girlfriend.
Sparrow Pidgeon	Dykes to Watch Out For	1983–2008	
Clarice Clifford	Dykes to Watch Out For	1983–2008	
Toni Ortiz	Dykes to Watch Out For	1983–2008	
Dr. Sydney Krukowski	Dykes to Watch Out For	1983–2008	
Thea	Girls With Slingshots	2004–2015	This webcomic, by Danielle Corsetto, focuses on the adventures of Jaime, Hazel, and their friends, and at one point "Thea and Angel have the safe lesbian sex talk." Corsetto also leads the readers through the "wonderful world of sex with girls," reminding readers that "sexuality comes in a number of flavors."
Angel	Girls With Slingshots	2004–2015	This webcomic, by Danielle Corsetto, focuses on the adventures of Jaime, Hazel, and their friends, and at one point "Thea and Angel have the safe lesbian sex talk." Corsetto also leads the readers through the "wonderful world of sex with girls," reminding readers that "sexuality comes in a number of flavors."
Lisa van Gogh	Venus Envy	2001–2014	Friends with Zoë and is on the soccer team, which is filled with other lesbians.
Maria Strongwell	Rain	2010–2022	Friends with Rain. She was a (then) closeted lesbian who eventually came out once she gained enough confidence.

== See also ==
- Media portrayal of lesbians
- Lesbian literature
- List of lesbian characters in television
- List of feature films with lesbian characters
- List of lesbian fiction
- Lesbian pulp fiction
- Epicenity
- Class S (culture)
- LGBT themes in comics
- List of yuri works
- List of animated series with LGBT characters
- List of fictional polyamorous characters
- List of LGBT-themed speculative fiction
- List of LGBT characters in soap operas
- List of LGBT-related films
- Lists of LGBT figures in fiction and myth
- List of made-for-television films with LGBT characters
