= Meagan Spooner =

American author of science fiction and fantasy for young adults

- Education: Hamilton College
- Occupation: Author
- Writing career
- Years active: 2012–present
- Genres: science fiction, fantasy
- Website: meaganspooner.com

Meagan Spooner is an American author of science fiction and fantasy for young adults. She is best known for the Starbound Trilogy and Unearthed, which she co-authored with Amie Kaufman, as well as for her solo Skylark trilogy and her standalone fairytale retelling Hunted.

== Biography ==
Meagan Spooner was raised in the United States and graduated from Thomas Jefferson High School for Science and Technology. She graduated from Hamilton College with a degree in playwriting. She has spent time living in Australia and has traveled to all seven continents, but currently resides in Asheville, North Carolina.

== Works ==
Spooner's debut, Skylark, was published by Carolrhoda Lab in 2012, and followed by sequels Shadowlark and Lark Ascending.

Spooner's Starbound trilogy began with These Broken Stars, co-authored with Amie Kaufman, published by Disney Hyperion. The book was a New York Times bestseller and won an Aurealis Award for Best Young Adult novel of the year. The book was also shortlisted for a Golden Inky in the Australian Inky Awards and was named the Huffington Post Best YA Novel of 2013. The series is currently in development for TV with Freeform in the US and Sky UK, with MGM the studio and Eric Balfour and Warren Littlefield producing. The sequel, This Shattered World was a nominee for the Aurealis Award for best science fiction novel.

Spooner began a series of historical-style retellings in 2017 with Hunted, inspired by Beauty and the Beast and the Russian story of the Firebird. The book was given a starred review by Kirkus. Spooner studied archery to prepare for writing the book.

Spooner's next series with Kaufman began with Unearthed in January 2018. In June 2017, ahead of the book's publication, it was announced that film rights had been acquired by Columbia Pictures. Director Doug Liman is attached to the project, set to produce alongside Cross Creek Productions. Screenwriters Jez Butterworth and John-Henry Butterworth are penning the script.

== Bibliography ==
=== Novels ===
Skylark Trilogy

1. Skylark (2012)
2. Shadowlark (2013)
3. Lark Ascending (2014)

Starbound Trilogy (co-authored with Amie Kaufman)

1. These Broken Stars (2013)
2. This Shattered World (2014)
3. Their Fractured Light (2015)

Retellings series

1. Hunted (2017)
2. Sherwood (2019)

Unearthed series (co-authored with Amie Kaufman)

1. Unearthed (2018)
2. Undying (2019)

The Other Side of the Sky series

1. Kaufman, Amie & Meagan Spooner (2020). The Other Side of the Sky. HarperTeen.

=== Critical studies and reviews of Spooner's work ===
The Other Side of the Sky

- Chandler, Benjamin (January–February 2021). "The End of the World: Three New Young Adult Novels". Australian Book Review. 428: 47–48.
