= Stormdancer =

2012 book by Jay Kristoff

- Author: Jay Kristoff
- Genre: Adult fantasy, steampunk
- Publisher: Thomas Dunne Books
- Publication date: 2012

Stormdancer is a 2012 adult fantasy steampunk book by Jay Kristoff. It is inspired by Japanese history and mythology and is the first installment in the Lotus Wars series.

== Synopsis ==
The book is set in the Shima Imperium, an island nation based on a steampunk, Shogun-era Japan, in which society is dependent upon the harvest of a psychotropic "Blood lotus" flower which poisons the environment in which it is grown. The teenage Yukiko's father is commanded by his shogun to capture an arashitora, a tiger-eagle chimera. As she accompanies him, the quest is complicated by her ability to commune with animals, which is punishable by death.

== Reception ==
The book received mixed to positive reviews from critics, who praised its worldbuilding and inclusion of East Asian mythology, as well as its environmental themes. The book received some criticism online for alleged cultural appropriation.

Susan Carpenter of Los Angeles Times wrote that the book was fast-paced and featured rich worldbuilding that built on themes of environmental degradation. Publishers Weekly praised the book's "innovative setting, fast-moving plot, vivid descriptions, and thrilling action scenes."

Matt Hilliard of Strange Horizons was more critical, writing that the book relied on established tropes of young adult fiction, and that its story was forgettable in comparison to the setting.

The book was shortlisted for the 2013 David Gemmell Awards for Fantasy, and was a finalist for the Compton Crook Award, and Aurealis Award for Best Fantasy Novel.
