= Empire of the Vampire =

2019 book by Jay Kristoff

- Author: Jay Kristoff
- Language: English
- Series: Empire of the Vampire
- Genre: Action, Dark Fantasy
- Publisher: HarperCollins
- Publication date: September 7, 2021
- Publication place: Australia
- ISBN: 9781250245281
- Followed by: Empire of the Damned
- Website: https://jaykristoff.com/books/empire-of-the-vampire/empire-of-the-vampire/

Empire of the Vampire is a 2021 illustrated horror-fantasy novel by Australian novelist Jay Kristoff.

== Plot ==
=== Present ===
Twenty-seven years after Daysdeath, a mysterious phenomenon that has cast the world into perpetual darkness, vampires have successfully conquered humanity. Gabriel de Leon, the last living vampire hunter, is held prisoner awaiting execution for killing the Forever King, Fabien Voss. However, the Undying Empress orders Gabriel to tell her personal historian, Jean-Francois Chastain, his entire life story.

=== Twenty Years Previous ===
At thirteen, Gabe encountered his first vampire when his younger sister and her friend vanished, returning days later as "wretched" (feral, zombie-like vampires that revive after decomposition has set in). When he was fifteen, he succumbs to a sudden bloodlust and bites a girl to drink her blood. Before a lynch mob could kill him, members of the Order of San Michon (a monastic Order of vampire hunters, colloquially known as "Silversaints") arrive and take Gabe into their custody, learning his true father was a vampire.

While hunting a vampire plaguing nearby villages, Gabe discovers he is a bloodmage, meaning his father was of the fifth, presumed extinct, vampire bloodline (Esani). Seeking to learn more about his heritage, Gabriel sneaks into the forbidden section of the Order's library where he encounters two novices, Astrid Rennier, the emperor's bastard, and Chloe Sauvage, researching what caused Daysdeath and how to end it. The three of them begin meeting secretly in the library to research both Daysdeath and the Esani bloodline.

Eventually, Gabe is brought along on a hunt after Laure Voss, Fabien's favorite daughter. Gabe manages to wound her, save his fellow Silversaints and intercept her message to her father. The Silversaints march to defend the route the message claims the Forever King plans to invade by, while Gabe is forced to stay behind due to insubordination. However, he discovers secret writing in Laure's message indicating the vampires will actually invade via an unguarded mountain pass. Gabe gathers all the nuns, monks, and blacksmiths in service to the Silversaints to stop the vampires. During the battle, Laure taunts Gabe with the knowledge she destroyed his village and killed his family; enraged, Gabe slays her using his blood magic while his comrades trigger an avalanche that destroys the approaching vampire army. For slaying Laure, Gabe is initiated into the Order and knighted by the empress for stopping the invasion. For the next five years, Gabe becomes the greatest of the Silversaints. However, he and Astrid concurrently stay as lovers over the years, resulting in their expulsion from the Order when she becomes pregnant.

=== Three Years Previous ===
After eleven years of being exiled, an older and bitter Gabe comes out of retirement. While travelling he meets Chloe, who has found the Holy Grail, Dior Lanchance; as a direct descendant of the Redeemer, her blood can destroy vampires and heal injuries. They are quickly pursued by Danton Voss, Fabien's youngest son and best hunter, and a mysterious masked vampire of the Esani bloodline called Liathe. Danton catches up to them at an abandoned monastery and kills their companions, but Gabe and Dior escape him by jumping off a cliff into a river.

Dior reveals that she discovered her powers as a young orphan and Chloe saved her from being executed for witchcraft and heresy. Gabe in turn reveals that after being excommunicated, he and Astrid married and had a daughter named Patience. For over a decade, they lived happily as a family, until Fabien arrived at their home. Seeking revenge for Laure, he murdered Patience and turned Astrid into a vampire. Gabriel swore to kill Fabien and his entire bloodline in retaliation for his family's deaths.

After escaping Inquisition agents hunting Dior, they find refuge in a town protected by two Silversaint comrades of Gabe's, but a pack of vampires led by Danton arrive and threaten to destroy the town unless Dior is surrendered to them. Dior flees to avoid risking innocent lives, but Gabe and Danton both pursue her. In the ensuing battle, Liathe arrives and slays the other vampires, while Gabe duels Danton until Dior stabs the distracted vampire in the back with a sword smeared with her blood, destroying him.

Finally reaching the Silversaints' monastery, Gabe discovers the Silversaints intend to sacrifice Dior to end Daysdeath. Gabe tries to stop them, but his former brothers slit his throat and throw him into a chasm. Liathe saves Gabe, revealing herself as his half-sister Celene Castia; turned into a vampire by Laure when she destroyed their village. With Liathe's help, Gabe saves Dior, killing several Silversaints in the process.

=== Present ===
Jean-François, has filled up his tome and must leave for the day. However, Gabe tries to kill him, but he is saved by his thrall. Gabe continues to wait in his cell for him to return and tell the rest of his tale, while also thinking about having Patience.

== Reception ==
Empire of the Vampire was an international bestseller, being listed on the New York Times, USA Today, Wall Street Journal and Sunday Times bestseller lists. It was a #1 bestseller at Barnes & Noble and Dymocks Booksellers, and would become the #1 bestselling Fantasy hardback in the United Kingdom for 2021. The book subsequently became a #1 bestseller in France and Spain, also achieving bestseller status in Germany and Italy, marking it as Kristoff's most commercially successful debut to date.

The book was well received by critics, who praised its exploration of vampire lore and the character of Gabriel. Janelle Janson, in a review for Cemetery Dance Publications, wrote that "Kristoff's visceral writing style, vivid imagery, and knack for the macabre made me swoon."

Critics debated as to Empire of the Vampire's genre, with Publishers Weekly calling it "dark fantasy" and Janson describing it as "an adult fantasy series with horrific elements." Rob H. Bedford, in a review for SFF World, dubbed the book "epic horror" which depicted the themes and tones of the horror genre on a larger scale more closely associated with epic fantasy. Some reviewers have compared to fantasy novels such as Patrick Rothfuss' The Name of the Wind.
