= Illuminae =

2015 science fiction novel by Amie Kaufman and Jay Kristoff

- Author: Amie Kaufman, Jay Kristoff
- Language: English
- Genre: Science fiction, Young Adult fiction, Fiction
- Publisher: Knopf Books for Young Readers
- Publication date: October 20, 2015
- Publication place: Australia
- Media type: Book
- Pages: 608
- Awards: Prime Minister's Literary Award, ABIA, Aurealis Award, Inky Award
- ISBN: 978-0553499117
- Followed by: Gemina, Obsidio

Illuminae is a 2015 young adult space opera epistolary novel written by Amie Kaufman and Jay Kristoff. This is the first novel of the three-book series The Illuminae Files. The story is told through a series of documents; including classified reports, censored emails, camera transcriptions, and interviews, all of which were curated for a court case against the main antagonist company, BeiTech. Illuminae is set in 2575 and is the collective story of teenage colonist Kady Grant and her boyfriend Ezra Mason, as they become refugees after becoming caught in a political crossfire.

The series was acquired by Random House in a preempt in 2013. The first book in the series was published in late October 2015. It debuted at #5 on the New York Times Best Seller List Young Adult Hardcover list, and eventually reached the #2 spot. Illuminae was nominated for the 2016 Prime Minister's Literary Award, won the 2015 Aurealis Award for Best Science Fiction Novel, the 2016 Gold Inky Award for best teen fiction, and the 2016 Australian Book Industry Award Book of the Year for Older Children.

The sequel, Gemina, debuted at #3 on the New York Times bestseller list and won the 2016 Aurealis Award for Best Science Fiction novel.

The third book in the series, Obsidio, debuted at #6 on the New York Times children's series list, as the #1 young adult bestseller in Australia, and as a USA Today bestseller.

An 82-page prequel novella, Memento, was released as a pre-order bonus in the United States for the authors' subsequent unrelated novel, Aurora Rising.

== Synopsis ==
An illegal heavy metals production plant and colony are taken under siege by a rival company, BeiTech. The two main protagonists of this book (Kady Grant and Ezra Mason) manage to escape from the planet, along with several thousand other refugees, but they are being pursued by a BeiTech warship. In an effort to survive, they have to deal with a biological weapon, a mentally unstable AI, and military coups, and through the book Kady strives to find the true meaning of all of this. The contents of this book reflect the story they have gathered in a case against BeiTech for crimes against humanity.

== Film adaptation ==
In November 2015, Brad Pitt's production company, Plan B Entertainment, and Warner Bros. bought the rights to Illuminae. Pitt, Dede Gardner, and Jeremy Kleiner are set to produce.

== Audio adaptation ==
The audiobook Illuminae, produced for Penguin Random House, is an Audie Award Winner. It is a full cast audio adaptation rather than a narrated audiobook, and features a cast of twenty starring Olivia Taylor Dudley as Kady Grant, Lincoln Hoppe as AIDAN and Jonathan McCain as Ezra Mason. It is 11 hours, 40 minutes long.
