= Darkdawn =

2019 book by Jay Kristoff

- Author: Jay Kristoff
- Language: English
- Series: Nevernight Chronicle
- Genre: Action, Dark Fantasy, Fiction
- Publisher: St. Martin's Press
- Publication date: September 3, 2019
- Publication place: Australia
- Pages: 512
- Preceded by: Godsgrave (2017)

Darkdawn is a 2019 adult dark fantasy novel by Jay Kristoff and is the conclusion to the Nevernight Chronicle trilogy. It was published by St. Martin's Press.

== Synopsis ==
After winning the gladiator games in Godsgrave, Mia is now a fugitive of the Red Church, the Republic of Itreya, and even the gods themselves. With her last target on the brink of total dominance of the Republic, she is left with few options. Night is finally falling on the world and Mia must take a perilous journey to complete her quest and finally learn the truth about her powers.

== Reception ==
The book received mostly positive reviews from critics as a conclusion to the trilogy. Kirkus Reviews called it a "fast-paced, epic conclusion to this dark and bloody tale." Publishers Weekly and Fiona Denton of Grimdark Magazine wrote that the book satisfyingly concluded the trilogy's plot thread's, and introducing twists to the metanarrative. Denton singled out the reveal of the narrator's identity as a particularly well written revelation.

The book debuted on the Sunday Times bestseller list, Kristoff's first entry on the list for his solo work. It was included on Gizmodo's list of the best science fiction and fantasy novels of 2019. It won the 2019 Aurealis Award for Best Fantasy Novel.
