= Godsgrave =

2017 book by Jay Kristoff

- Author: Jay Kristoff
- Language: English
- Series: Nevernight Chronicle
- Genre: Action, Dark Fantasy, Fiction
- Publisher: Thomas Dunne Books
- Publication date: September 5, 2017
- Publication place: Australia
- Pages: 464
- Preceded by: Nevernight (2016)
- Followed by: Darkdawn (2019)

Godsgrave is a 2017 adult dark fantasy novel by Jay Kristoff. It is the second installment in the Nevernight Chronicle, after Nevernight (2016).

== Synopsis ==
Assassin Mia Corvere continues her quest to avenge her family, while mastering her Darkin abilities to control shadows. She begins training as a gladiator in the arenas as a way to grow closer to her next target.

== Reception ==
The book received mostly positive reviews from critics for its swift pacing, dark humor and bloody violence. The book won the 2017 Aurealis Award for Best Fantasy Novel.
