= Nevernight =

2016 novel by Jay Kristoff

- Author: Jay Kristoff
- Language: English
- Series: Nevernight Chronicle
- Genre: Action, Dark Fantasy, Fiction
- Publisher: Thomas Dunne Books
- Publication date: August 9th, 2016
- Publication place: Australia
- Pages: 429
- ISBN: 9781466885035
- Followed by: Godsgrave (2017)

Nevernight is a 2016 adult, dark fantasy novel by Jay Kristoff. It is the first installment in the Nevernight Chronicle. Set in the Republic of Itreya, it follows fledgling assassin Mia Corvere seeking revenge for her family.

== Synopsis ==
The book follows assassin Mia Corvere as she seeks revenge against the most powerful people in the Republic of Itreya for destroying her family. After training under the tutelage of former assassin Mercurio, she trains at the Red Church to become an assassin, while also learning to master her abilities as a Darkin, a mysterious being who can control shadows. Her powers are limited by the fact that the world has three suns, and night only occurs every two and a half years.

== Characters ==
- Mia Corvere: The main protagonist, the last daughter of House Corvere who seeks to avenge her family, also a Darkin accompanied by her familiar Mister Kindly.
- Tric: A Dweymeri bastard, acolyte of the Red Church and Mia's love interest.
- Ashlin Jarnheim: An acolyte of the Red Church and a daughter of a former assassin who befriends Mia and Tric.
- Mercurio: A former assassin of the Red Church, Mia's mentor and adopted father.
- The Ministry: Mother Drusilla, Solis, Mouser, SpiderKiller, and Aelea, the leaders and teachers of the Red Church.
- Hush: A mute acolyte of the Red Church.
- Marius and Marielle: Twin albino sorcerers employed by the Red Church.
- Lord Cassius: Head of the Red Church and a Darkin accompanied by his familiar Eclipse.
- Chronicler Aelius: The centuries-old librarian of the Red Church.
- Markus Remus: Commanding officer for the Illuminati legionnaires who Mia seeks to kill.

== Reception ==
Nevernight received mostly positive reviews from critics, with praise for its worldbuilding, heroine and writing style. The book earned Kristoff his second David Gemmell Awards nomination, and won the 2016 Aurealis Award for Best Fantasy Novel.

Publishers Weekly gave the book a positive review, writing that it balanced "beauty and decay" and "the ancient and the magical" as the story unfolded. The book received four out of five stars from Becky Vosburg of Seattle Book Review.

== Adaptation ==
In 2019, an adaptation of the book was created with funding assistance from Screen Australia. A three-part mini-series based on the first several chapters of Nevernight was released on YouTube in 2019.
