= Amie Kaufman =

Australian writer

- Kaufman in 2026
- Born: Melbourne, Victoria, Australia
- Occupation: Author
- Writing career
- Years active: 2013–present
- Genres: Science fiction, fantasy, young adult fiction
- Notable awards: Aurealis Award, Australian Book Industry Award, Gold Inky Award
- Website: amiekaufman.com

Amie Kaufman is an Australian author. She has authored New York Times bestselling and internationally bestselling science fiction and fantasy for young adults. She is known for the Starbound Trilogy and Unearthed, which she co-authored with Meagan Spooner; for her series The Illuminae Files, co-authored with Jay Kristoff; and for her solo series, Elementals. Her books have been published in over 35 countries.

== Biography ==
Kaufman grew up in both Ireland and Melbourne, Australia. She earned undergraduate degrees, with honours, in law, history and literature. Later, she earned a Master's Degree in conflict resolution, and worked for seven years as a mediator before becoming a full-time author. She is as of May 2018 a PhD candidate in Creative Writing. She lives in Melbourne, Australia with her husband and dog.

== Literary career ==
Kaufman's debut, These Broken Stars, was co-authored with Meagan Spooner. The book was a New York Times bestseller and won an Aurealis Award for Best Young Adult novel of the year. The book was also shortlisted for a Golden Inky in the Australian Inky Awards and was named the Huffington Post Best YA Novel of 2013, The series was in development for TV in 2016, with Freeform in the US and Sky UK, with MGM the studio and Eric Balfour and Warren Littlefield producing. The sequel, This Shattered World was a nominee for the Aurealis Award for best science fiction novel.

Kaufman's Illuminae, co-authored with Jay Kristoff, was acquired by Random House in a preempt in 2013. The first book in the series was published in late October 2015. It debuted at #5 on the New York Times Best Seller List Young Adult Hardcover list, and eventually reached the #2 spot. In November 2015, it was announced that Brad Pitt and his production company, Plan B Entertainment, had acquired the film rights to Illuminae. Illuminae was nominated for the 2016 Prime Minister's Literary Award, won the 2015 Aurealis Award for Best Science Fiction novel, the 2016 Gold Inky Award for best teen fiction, and the 2016 Australian Book Industry Award Book of the Year for Older Children. The sequel Gemina, debuted at #3 on the New York Times bestseller list and won the 2016 Aurealis Award for Best Science Fiction novel. The third book in the series, Obsidio, debuted at #6 on the New York Times children's series list, as the #1 young adult bestseller in Australia, and as a USA Today bestseller.

Kaufman's next series with Spooner began with Unearthed in January 2018. In June 2017, ahead of the book's publication, it was announced that film rights had been acquired by Columbia Pictures, with Doug Liman as director and producer alongside Cross Creek Productions. Screenwriters were Jez Butterworth and John-Henry Butterworth.

Kaufman's first solo series and first series for younger readers, Elementals, began with Ice Wolves in March 2018. The book was a Spring 2018 Indie Next Pick, and earned a starred review from Kirkus.

== List of works ==
=== Novels ===
Starbound trilogy

The Starbound trilogy, co-authored with Meagan Spooner, consists of the following novels: These Broken Stars (2013), This Shattered World (2014), and Their Fractured Light (2015).

These Broken Stars received a starred review from Booklist, as well as the following accolades:

- Aurealis Award for Best Young Adult Novel (2013) (Tied with Fairytales for Wilde Girls by Allyse Near)
- Inky Awards shortlist for Gold Inky (2014)
- Goodreads Choice Award Nominee for Young Adult Fantasy & Science Fiction (2014)

This Shattered World was shortlisted for the Aurealis Award for both Best Fantasy Novel and Best Science Fiction Novel (2014)

Their Fractured Light was shortlisted for the Aurealis Award for Best Science Fiction Novel (2015)

On May 2, 2016, the trilogy was acquired by MGM Television to be adapted into a television series for Freeform and Sky UK.

Unearthed series

The Unearthed series, co-authored with Meagan Spooner, consists of the following novels: Unearthed (2017) and Undying (2018).

The Illuminae Files series

The Illuminae Files series, co-authored with Jay Kristoff, consists of the following novels: Illuminae (2015), Gemina (2016), Obsidio (2018), and the novella, Memento (2020).

Illuminae was a New York Times Bestseller. It received a starred review from Booklist and Kirkus, as well as the following accolades:

- Kirkus Reviews' Best Books Of 2015
- Australian Book Industry Award (ABIA) for Older Children (ages 8–14) (2015)
- Aurealis Award - winner for Best Science Fiction Novel and shortlisted for Best Young Adult Novel (2015)
- Goodreads Choice Award Nominee for Young Adult Fantasy & Science Fiction (2015)
- American Library Association's (ALA) Amazing Audiobooks for Young Adults Top Ten (2016)
- ALA Best Fiction for Young Adults (2016)
- ALA Teens' Top Ten (2016)
- The Inky Awards Shortlist for Gold Inky (2016)
- Premio El Templo de las Mil Puertas Nominee for Mejor novela extranjera perteneciente a saga (2016)
- Audie Award for Multi-Voiced Performance (2016)
- The Inky Awards for Gold Inky (2016)
- Rhode Island Teen Book Award Nominee (2017)
- Evergreen Teen Book Award Nominee (2018)
- Lincoln Award Nominee (2019)

Gemina received the following accolades:

- Aurealis Award for Best Science Fiction Novel
- Goodreads Choice Award Nominee for Young Adult Fantasy & Science Fiction (2016)
- American Library Association Amazing Audiobooks for Young Adults Top Ten (2017)

Obsidio received starred reviews from Kirkus and Booklist, as well as the following accolades:

- Goodreads Choice Award Nominee for Young Adult Fantasy & Science Fiction (2018)
- American Library Association's Amazing Audiobooks for Young Adults (2019)

Elementals trilogy

The Elementals trilogy consists of the following novels: Ice Wolves (2018), Scorch Dragons (2019), and Battle Born (2020).

Ice Wolves received a starred review from Kirkus.

Aurora Cycle trilogy

The Aurora Cycle trilogy, co-authored with Jay Kristoff, consists of the following novels: Aurora Rising (2019), Aurora Burning (2020), and Aurora’s End (2021).

Aurora Rising received starred reviews from Kirkus and Booklist, as well as the following accolades:

- Booklist Editors' Choice: Youth Audio (2019)
- Aurealis Award for Best Science Fiction Novel and for Best Young Adult Novel (2019)
- Goodreads Choice Award Nominee for Young Adult Fantasy & Science Fiction (2019)
- American Library Association's (ALA) Teens' Top Ten (2020)
- ALA Best Fiction for Young Adults (2020)

Aurora Burning was a Goodreads Choice Award Nominee for Young Adult Fantasy & Science Fiction (2020) and Australian Independent Booksellers' Indie Book Award Nominee for Young Adult (2020).

The Other Side of the Sky series

1. Kaufman, Amie & Meagan Spooner (2020). The Other Side of the Sky. HarperTeen.
2. Beyond the End of the World: The Other Side of the Sky 2, co-authored with Meagan Spooner, was published 18 January 2022 by Allen & Unwin.

The World Between Blinks

The World Between Blinks, co-authored with Ryan Graudin, was published on 5 January 2021 by Quill Tree Books. The book received a starred review from Booklist.

The Isles of the Gods Series

The Isles of the Gods was published on 2 May 2023 by Random House Children's Books.

The Heart of the World was published on 19 September 2024 by Rock The Boat.

Lady's Knight series

Lady's Knight, co-authored with Meagan Spooner, was published in June 2025 by A&U Children's in Australia, Electric Monkey (Harper) in the UK and Storytide/HarperCollins in the United States.

The sequel, One Knight Stand, also co-authored with Spooner, will be published in June 2026.

Standalone Novels

Red Star Rebels was published on 10 February 2026 by Knopf Books for Young Readers.

=== Short fiction ===
- "One Small Step..." in Begin, End, Begin, edited by Danielle Binks (2017)
- "I Swear This Part Is True" in Where The Shoreline Used To Be, edited by Susan La Marca and Pam Macintyre (2016)

=== Critical studies and reviews of Kaufman's work ===
The Other Side of the Sky

- Chandler, Benjamin (January–February 2021). "The End of the World: Three New Young Adult Novels". Australian Book Review. 428: 47–48.
