= Nevernight Chronicle =

Trilogy of fantasy books by Jay Kristoff

- Nevernight; Godsgrave; Darkdawn
- Author: Jay Kristoff
- Country: Australia
- Language: English
- Genre: Dark fantasy
- Publisher: Thomas Dunne Books
- Published: August 9, 2016 – September 3, 2019
- No. of books: 3

The Nevernight Chronicle is a trilogy of adult fantasy novels by Australian novelist Jay Kristoff.

== Plot ==
The book centers on Mia Corvere, an assassin with the ability to manipulate darkness who plots revenge against her family's killers.

== Series ==
- Nevernight (2016)
- Godsgrave (2017)
- Darkdawn (2019)

== Reception ==
The series was well received by critics, with praise for its pacing, dark humor, worldbuilding, and conclusion. It was noted for its dark themes, and mature subject matter dealing with violence and sexuality. Each installment in the series received the Aurealis Award for Best Fantasy Novel the year of its release.

The character of Mia Corvere was also praised as a three-dimensional female protagonist. In an article for the journal Gender Forum, Marthe-Siobhán Hecke argued that Corvere's nuanced characterization subverted expectations of both female protagonists and of revenge narratives.

The series' conclusion, Darkdawn, was published in 2019 and appeared on several year's end lists' of the best fantasy books and series conclusions. It debuted on the Sunday Times bestseller list, the first of Kristoff's solo works to do so.

== Adaptations ==
In 2019, Piera Forde produced a web series adaptation of Nevernight on YouTube.
