= Inky Awards =

Australian literary award

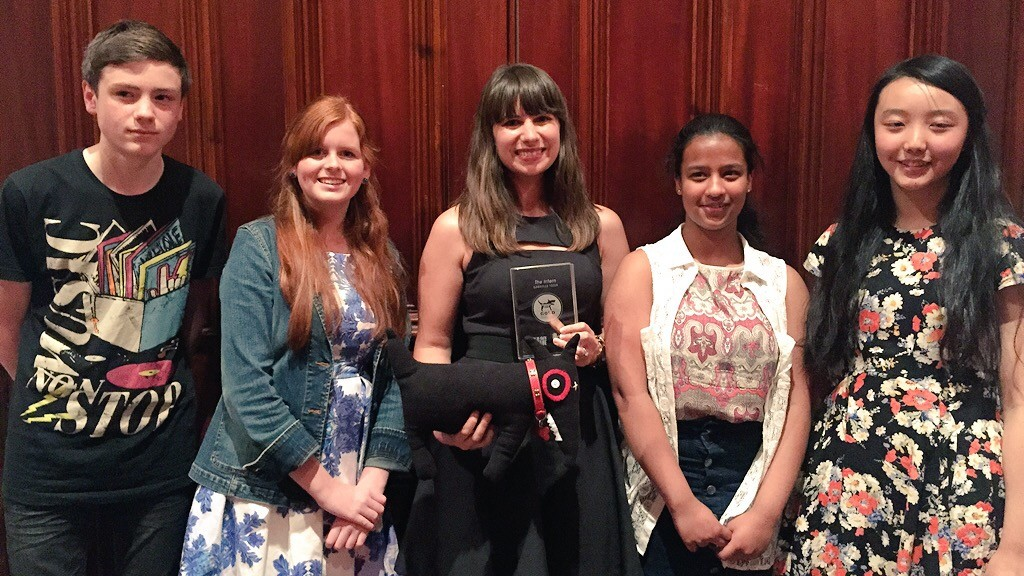

The Inky Awards recognise high-quality young adult literature, with the longlist and shortlist selected by young adults, and the winners voted for online by the teen readers of the Inside a Dog website. There are two awards: the Gold Inky Award for an Australian young adult title, and the Silver Inky Award for an international (non-Australian) young adult title.

The Awards are named after Inky – the Inside a Dog mascot and all-round wonder-dog.

The Inky Awards were founded by the Centre for Youth Literature at the State Library Victoria in 2007 as Australia's first national teen choice awards for young adult literature.

In 2020, the INKY awards were discontinued indefinitely as part of State Library timetabling changes.

== Gold Inky Award Winners (Australian) ==
Year	Author	Title	Publisher
2019	Lynette Noni	Whisper	Pantera
2018	Peter Vu	Paper Cranes Don’t Fly	Ford Street
2017	Cath Crowley	Words in Deep Blue	Pan Macmillan
2016	Amie Kaufman & Jay Kristoff	Illuminae	Allen and Unwin
2015	Gabrielle Tozer	The Intern	HarperCollins
2014	Will Kostakis	The First Third	Penguin Random House
2013	Barry Jonsberg	My Life as an Alphabet	Allen and Unwin
2012	Em Bailey	Shift	Hardie Grant Egmont
2011	James Moloney	Silvermay	HarperCollins
2010	Lucy Christopher	Stolen	Scholastic
2009	Randa Abdul-Fattah	Where the Streets Have No Name	HarperCollins
2008	James Roy	Town	University of Queensland Press
2007	Simmone Howell	Notes from the Teenage Underground	Pan Macmillan

== Silver Inky Award Winners (Non-Australian) ==
Year	Author	Title	Publisher	Ref.
2019	Holly Black	The Cruel Prince	Allen & Unwin	
2018	Angie Thomas	The Hate U Give	Walker	
2017	Alice Oseman	Radio Silence	HarperCollins	
2016	Jandy Nelson	I'll Give You the Sun	Walker Books	
2015	Rainbow Rowell	Fangirl	Pan Macmillan	
2014	Julie Berry	All The Truth That's In Me	HarperCollins	
2013	Maggie Stiefvater	The Raven Boys	Scholastic	
2012	John Green	The Fault in Our Stars	Penguin Random House	
2011	Cassandra Clare	Clockwork Angel	Walker Books	
2010	Maggie Stiefvater	Shiver	Scholastic	
2009	Suzanne Collins	The Hunger Games	Scholastic	
2008	Jenny Downham	Before I Die	Penguin Random House	
2007	John Green	Looking for Alaska	HarperCollins	

== The Process ==
Eligible books are submitted for consideration by publishers via a nomination form on InsideaDog.com.au.

A longlist of 10 Australian books and 10 international books is then selected by "Inky Awards teen alumni", with the Centre for Youth Literature staff acting as the filter for coordination and eligibility.

The longlist is read by a panel of teenaged judges, who whittle the list down to a shortlist of ten books (5 Australian, 5 international).

The shortlist is published on Inside a Dog and individuals aged 12–18 can vote for their favourite. The Australian book with the most votes receives the Gold Inky Award and a cash prize ($2000), and the international book with the most votes wins the Silver Inky Award.
