= Jay Kristoff =

Australian fantasy and science fiction writer (born 1973)

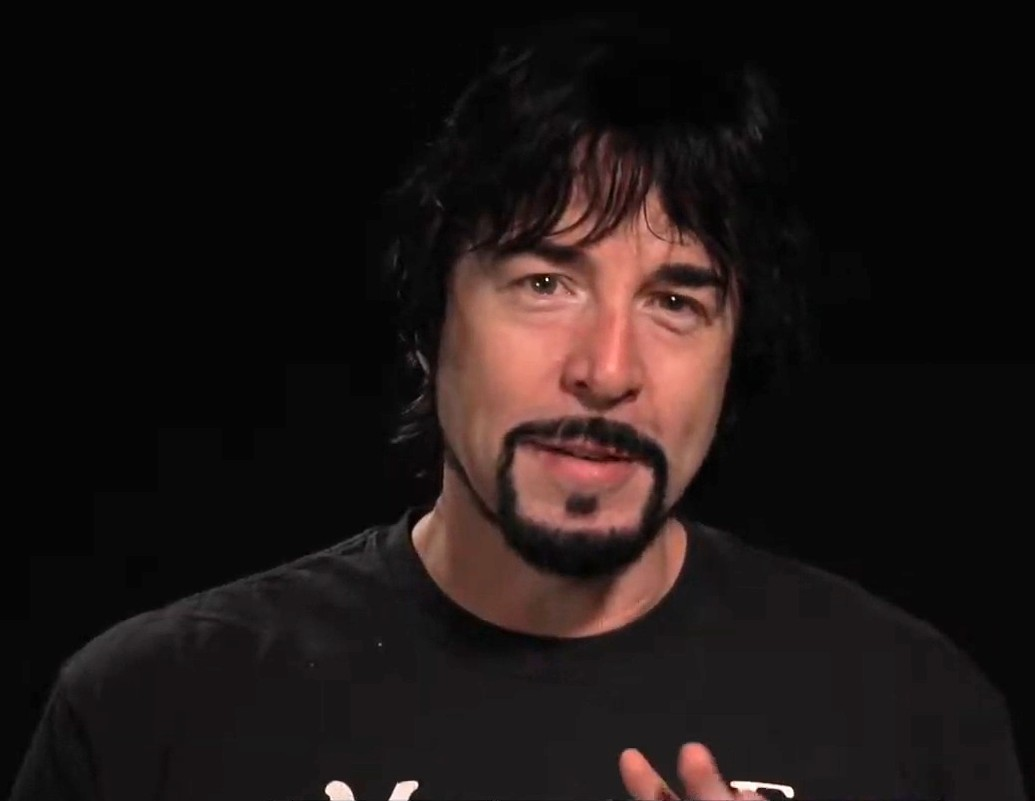
- Kristoff in 2022
- Born: 11 November 1973 (age 52); Perth, Western Australia, Australia
- Occupation: Author
- Writing career
- Period: 2012–present
- Genres: Fantasy, science fiction
- Notable awards: Aurealis Award, Australian Book Industry Award, Gold Inky Award
- Website: jaykristoff.com

Jay Kristoff (born 11 November 1973) is an Australian author of fantasy and science fiction novels. As of 2025, he has published 18 novels, both for adult readers and young adults. He currently resides in Melbourne.

== Biography ==
Kristoff was born in Perth, Western Australia in 1973. As a child, Kristoff read frequently and played tabletop games, including Dungeons & Dragons. Kristoff is 6 ft 7 in (201 cm) tall. He graduated from college with an Arts degree. He worked in creative advertising for television for eleven years before beginning his literary career. He lives in Melbourne, Australia, with his wife.

== Works ==
The Lotus War

Kristoff is the author of The Lotus War, a Steampunk series inspired by Tokugawa-era Japan. The first novel, Stormdancer, was a finalist for a 2012 Aurealis Award, was shortlisted for two 2013 David Gemmell Awards (for best novel and best debut novel), and was a finalist for the 2013 Compton Crook Award. The prequel novella The Last Stormdancer was the winner of the 2013 Aurealis Award for Best Fantasy Short Fiction. Kristoff refers to the series as crossover fiction that appeals to older young adults and adults.

The Illuminae Files

Kristoff's second series, The Illuminae Files, was acquired by Random House in a preempt in 2013. Kristoff co-wrote the series with fellow Melbourne author, Amie Kaufman. The first book in the series, titled Illuminae, was published in late October 2015. It debuted at #5 on the New York Times Best Seller List Young Adult Hardcover list, and eventually reached the #2 spot. In November 2015, it was announced that Brad Pitt and his production company, Plan B Entertainment, had acquired the film rights to Illuminae. Illuminae was nominated for the 2016 Prime Minister's Literary Award, won the 2015 Aurealis Award for Best Science Fiction novel, the 2016 Gold Inky Award for best teen fiction, and the 2016 Australian Book Industry Award Book of the Year for Older Children. The sequel to Illuminae, Gemina, debuted at #3 on The New York Times bestseller list and won the 2016 Aurealis Award for Best Science Fiction novel. The final book in the series Obsidio, was published in May 2018, and debuted at #6 on The New York Times bestselling series list as the #1 young adult bestseller in Australia, and as a USA Today bestseller. Kristoff refers to the series as young adult fiction.

The Nevernight Chronicle

Kristoff's second solo series, an adult epic fantasy entitled the Nevernight Chronicle, commenced publication with Nevernight in August 2016. Nevernight earned Kristoff his second David Gemmell Awards nomination, and won the 2016 Aurealis Award for Best Fantasy Novel. The sequel Godsgrave was published in October, 2017, and won the 2017 Aurealis Award for Best Fantasy novel. In 2019, it was announced Screen Australia had funded a film adaptation of the first novel. The series finale Darkdawn was published in September, 2019, debuting on the Sunday Times and USA Today bestseller lists. In the same month, the trilogy was published in Italy by Arnoldo Mondadori Editore and became an instant bestseller. The series has subsequently achieved bestseller status in Germany, Spain and France.

Lifelike

In March 2016, Kristoff announced another young adult series, entitled Lifel1k3. Lifel1k3 was published in May, 2018, and won Kristoff his fifth Aurealis Award, again for best Science Fiction Novel. The sequel, Dev1at3, was published in June, 2019. The third and final book in the series, Truel1f3, was published in 2020. The series was shortlisted for the Sara Douglass Award For Best Series as part of the Aurealis Awards in 2021.

The Aurora Cycle

Kristoff and his Illuminae co-author Amie Kaufman announced a new science fiction series, entitled Aurora Rising, which was acquired by Random House, the publishers of the Illuminae series. Aurora Rising was published in May 2019, and debuted at #2 on The New York Times bestseller list, as the #1 young adult bestseller in Australia, and as a USA Today bestseller. In June 2019, it was announced that Metro-Goldwyn-Mayer had acquired the television rights to Aurora Rising. A sequel, titled Aurora Burning, was published in May 2020, and the final book, Aurora's End, was published in November 2021.

Empire of the Vampire

In January 2019, Kristoff announced his next adult series, an illustrated fantasy epic entitled Empire of the Vampire, which was acquired by Macmillan Publishers, the publisher of his Nevernight and Stormdancer series. Empire of the Vampire was published in September 2021. It debuted on the New York Times, Wall Street Journal, USA Today bestseller lists in the US and was a Sunday Times bestseller in the UK, as well as hitting #1 bestseller spots at Barnes and Noble in the USA and Dymocks Books in Australia. Empire of the Vampire would become the #1 bestselling Fantasy hardback in the United Kingdom for 2021, and subsequently achieved #1 bestseller status in France and Spain, also achieving bestseller status in Germany and Italy, marking it as Kristoff's most commercially successful debut to date.The sequel, Empire of the Damned, was published in March 2024. In October 2025, the third and final installment of the trilogy, Empire of the Dawn, was published.

=== Themes ===
Kristoff's works deal with themes of familial bonds, friendship, love, loss, and betrayal. His fiction suggests that "victory without sacrifice is meaningless".

== Books ==
=== The Lotus War Series ===
1. Stormdancer (Thomas Dunne Books, 2012)
2. Kinslayer (Thomas Dunne Books, 2013)
3. Endsinger (Thomas Dunne Books, 2014)
- The Last Stormdancer (prequel novella to Stormdancer; Thomas Dunne Books, 2013)
- "Praying for Rain" (free short story, posted online 2013)

=== The Illuminae Files (co-authored with Amie Kaufman) ===
1. Illuminae (Random House, 2015)
2. Gemina (Random House, 2016)
3. Obsidio (Random House, 2018)
- Memento (Prequel novella; Random House, 2019)

=== The Nevernight Chronicle ===
1. Nevernight (Thomas Dunne Books, 2016)
2. Godsgrave (Thomas Dunne Books, 2017)
3. Darkdawn (Thomas Dunne Books, 2019)

=== Lifel1k3 ===
1. Lifel1k3 (Random House, 2018)
2. Dev1at3 (Random House, 2019)
3. Truel1f3 (Random House, 2020)

=== The Aurora Cycle (co-authored with Amie Kaufman) ===
1. Aurora Rising (Random House, 2019)
2. Aurora Burning (Random House, 2020)
3. Aurora's End (Random House, 2021)

=== Empire of The Vampire ===
1. Empire of the Vampire (HarperCollins, 2021)
2. Empire of the Damned (HarperCollins, 2024)
3. Empire of the Dawn (HarperCollins, 2025)
