= 1997 in Australian literature =

This article presents a list of the historical events and publications of Australian literature during 1997.

== Events ==
- David Foster won the Miles Franklin Award for The Glade Within the Grove
- The list of The Sydney Morning Herald Best Young Australian Novelists is published for the first time.

== Major publications ==
=== Novels ===
- John Birmingham — The Tasmanian Babes Fiasco
- James Bradley — Wrack
- Peter Carey — Jack Maggs
- J. M. Coetzee — Boyhood: Scenes from Provincial Life
- Marele Day — Lambs of God
- Luke Davies — Candy
- Delia Falconer — The Service of Clouds
- Richard Flanagan — The Sound of One Hand Clapping
- Elizabeth Jolley — Lovesong
- Rod Jones — Nightpictures
- Melissa Lucashenko — Steam Pigs
- Colleen McCullough — Caesar
- Madeleine St John — The Essence of the Thing
- Tim Winton — Blueback
- Alexis Wright — Plains of Promise

=== Children's and young adult fiction ===
- Damien Broderick and Rory Barnes — Zones
- Kim Caraher — Up a Gum Tree
- Isobelle Carmody
  - Darkfall
  - Greylands
- Gary Crew and Michael O'Hara — The Blue Feather
- Sonya Hartnett — Princes
- Catherine Jinks — Eye to Eye
- Garth Nix — Shade's Children
- Sarah Walker — The Year of Freaking Out
- Tim Winton — Lockie Leonard, Legend

=== Science fiction and fantasy ===
- Damien Broderick — The White Abacus
- Damien Broderick & David G. Hartwell (edited) — Centaurus: The Best of Australian Science Fiction
- Sara Douglass
  - Sinner
  - Threshold
- Greg Egan
  - Diaspora
  - "Reasons to Be Cheerful"
- Kim Wilkins — The Infernal

=== Crime ===
- Jon Cleary — A Different Turf
- Peter Corris
  - The Reward
  - The Washington Club
- Garry Disher — Fallout
- Kerry Greenwood — Raisins and Almonds

=== Poetry ===
- Peter Boyle — The Blue Cloud of Crying
- Alison Croggon — The Blue Gate
- Philip Hodgins — Selected Poems
- Coral Hull — Broken Land
- Jill Jones — The Book of Possibilities
- Emma Lew — The Wild Reply
- Rhyll McMaster — Chemical Bodies: A diary of probable events, 1994–1997
- Peter Porter — Dragons in Their Pleasant Palaces
- Fay Zwicky — The Gatekeeper's Wife

=== Drama ===
- Hilary Bell — Wolf Lullaby
- Leah Purcell and Scott Rankin — Box the Pony
- David Williamson — After the Ball

=== Non-fiction ===
- Mark Raphael Baker — The Fiftieth Gate
- Barbara Blackman — Glass after Glass
- Lynne Hume — Witchcraft and Paganism in Australia
- Roberta Sykes — Snake Cradle

== Awards and honours ==
- Morris West AO "for service to literature"
- Barbara Buick AM "for service to women, particularly through Equal Employment Opportunity Tribunal in Western Australia and to librarianship and publishing, particularly through the promotion of children's literature"
- Ken Goodwin (academic) AM "for service to literature, art administration and education"
- Manfred Jurgensen AM "for service to literature as a novelist, poet and critic, and as founder of the journal Outrider"
- Edna Laing OAM "for service to the arts and literature through the Creativity Centre, Brisbane"
- Rodney Lumer OAM "for service to the arts through the promotion and publication of works by Australian playwrights"
- Sydney John Trigellis-Smith OAM "for service to military history as a researcher, author and publisher of several unit histories of campaigns of World War II"
- Albert Ullin OAM "for service to the promotion of children's literature in Australia and overseas"

=== Lifetime achievement ===
Award	Author
Christopher Brennan Award	Not awarded
Patrick White Award	Vivian Smith

=== Literary ===
Award	Author	Title	Publisher
The Age Book of the Year Award	Peter Carey	Jack Maggs	University of Queensland Press
ALS Gold Medal	Robert Dessaix	Night Letters	Macmillan Books
Colin Roderick Award	Peter Edwards	A Nation at War	Allen & Unwin
Nita Kibble Literary Award	Helen Garner	True Stories: Selected Non-Fiction	Text Publishing

=== Fiction ===
==== International ====
Award	Category	Author	Title	Publisher
Commonwealth Writers' Prize	Best Novel, SE Asia and South Pacific region	Sue Woolfe	Leaning Towards Infinity	Random House

==== National ====
Award	Author	Title	Publisher
Adelaide Festival Awards for Literature	Not awarded		
The Age Book of the Year Award	Peter Carey	Jack Maggs	University of Queensland Press
The Australian/Vogel Literary Award	Eva Sallis	Hiam	Allen and Unwin
Kathleen Mitchell Award	Not awarded		
Miles Franklin Award	David Foster	The Glade Within the Grove	Vintage
New South Wales Premier's Literary Awards	Robert Drewe	The Drowner	Pan Macmillan Australia
Victorian Premier's Literary Awards	Robert Drewe	The Drowner	Pan Macmillan Australia
Western Australian Premier's Book Awards	Robert Drewe	The Drowner	Pan Macmillan Australia
Western Australian Premier's Book Awards	Gail Jones	Fetish Lives	Fremantle Arts Centre Press

=== Crime and Mystery ===
==== National ====
Award	Category	Author	Title	Publisher
Ned Kelly Award
Ned Kelly Award	Novel	Shane Maloney	The Brush-Off	Text Publishing
Ned Kelly Award	First novel	Peter Temple	Bad Debts	HarperCollins
Ned Kelly Award	First novel	Peter Doyle	Get Rich Quick	Mandarin Publishing
Ned Kelly Award	Lifetime Achievement	Alan Yates		

=== Children and Young Adult ===
Award	Category	Author	Title	Publisher
Children's Book of the Year Award	Older Readers	James Moloney	A Bridge to Wiseman's Cove	University of Queensland Press
Children's Book of the Year Award	Picture Book	Elizabeth Honey	Not a Nibble!	Little Ark
New South Wales Premier's Literary Awards	Young People's Literature	Junko Morimoto	The Two Bullies	Random House Australia
Victorian Premier's Prize for Young Adult Fiction		Catherine Jinks	Pagan's Scribe	Omnibus Books

=== Science fiction and fantasy ===
Award	Category	Author	Title	Publisher
Aurealis Award	Sf Novel	Sean Williams	Metal Fatigue	HarperCollins Publishers
Aurealis Award	Sf Short Story	Leanne Frahm	"Borderline"	Borderline
Aurealis Award	Fantasy Novel	Sara Douglass	Enchanter and StarMan (The Axis Trilogy)	HarperCollins Publishers
Aurealis Award	Fantasy Novel	Jack Dann	The Memory Cathedral	Bantam Books
Aurealis Award	Fantasy Short Story	Russell Blackford	"The Sword of God"	Dream Weavers
Aurealis Award	Horror Novel	Not awarded		
Aurealis Award	Horror Short Story	Sean Williams	"Passing the Bone"	Eidolon #20, Summer 1996
Aurealis Award	Young Adult Novel	Kerry Greenwood	The Broken Wheel	HarperCollins Publishers
Aurealis Award	Young Adult Novel	Hilary Bell	Mirror, Mirror	Hodder Headline
Aurealis Award	Young Adult Short Story	Isobelle Carmody	"Green Monkey Dreams"	Green Monkey Dreams
Australian SF Achievement Award	Best Australian Long Fiction	Lucy Sussex	The Scarlet Rider	Tor/Forge
Australian SF Achievement Award	Best Australian Short Fiction	Russell Blackford	"The Sword of God"	Dream Weavers

=== Poetry ===
Award	Author	Title	Publisher
Adelaide Festival Awards for Literature	Not awarded		
The Age Book of the Year Award	Emma Lew	The Wild Reply	Black Pepper
The Age Book of the Year Award	Peter Porter	Dragons in Their Pleasant Palaces	Oxford University Press
Anne Elder Award	Morgan Yasbincek	Night Reversing	Fremantle Arts Centre Press
Grace Leven Prize for Poetry	Geoffrey Lehmann	Collected Poems	Heinemann
Mary Gilmore Award	Morgan Yasbincek	Night Reversing	Fremantle Arts Centre Press
New South Wales Premier's Literary Awards	Anthony Lawrence	The Viewfinder	University of Queensland Press
Victorian Premier's Literary Awards	Les Murray	Subhuman Redneck Poems	Duffy and Snellgrove
Western Australian Premier's Book Awards	Alec Choate	The Wheels of Hama: Collected War Poems	Victor Publishing

=== Drama ===
Award	Category	Author	Title
New South Wales Premier's Literary Awards	FilmScript	Trevor Graham	Mabo: Life of an Island Man
New South Wales Premier's Literary Awards	Play	Michael Gurr	Jerusalem
Victorian Premier's Literary Awards	Drama	Michael Gurr	Jerusalem

=== Non-fiction ===
Award	Category	Author	Title	Publisher
Adelaide Festival Awards for Literature	Not awarded			
The Age Book of the Year Award	Non-Fiction	Roberta Sykes	Snake Cradle	Allen and Unwin
National Biography Award	Biography	Not awarded		
New South Wales Premier's Literary Awards	Non-Fiction	Alan Atkinson	The Europeans in Australia: A History, Volume One	Oxford University Press
Victorian Premier's Literary Awards	Non-Fiction	Peter Robb	Midnight in Sicily	Duffy and Snellgrove

== Deaths ==
A list, ordered by date of death (and, if the date is either unspecified or repeated, ordered alphabetically by surname) of deaths in 1997 of Australian literary figures, authors of written works or literature-related individuals follows, including year of birth.

- 14 February — Marian Eldridge, short story writer, poet and book reviewer (born 1936)
- 16 February — Gilbert Mant, journalist and writer (born 1902)
- 8 March — Rupert Lockwood, journalist and author (born 1908)
- 14 April — Kit Denton, writer and broadcaster (born 1928)
- 8 June — George Turner, writer and critic, best known for science fiction novels (born 1916)
- 11 June — Jill Neville, novelist, playwright and poet (born 1932)
- 16 June — Dal Stivens, novelist and short story writer (born 1911)
- 19 June — David Denholm, author and historian who published fiction under the pseudonym David Forrest and history under his own name (born 1924)
- 1 July — David Martin, novelist, poet, playwright, journalist, editor, literary reviewer and lecturer (born 1915)
- 2 August — Joyce Dingwell, writer of more than 80 romance novels for Mills & Boon from 1931 to 1986, who also wrote under the pseudonym of Kate Starr (born 1909)

Unknown date

- Roger Bennett, actor and playwright (born 1948)

== See also ==
- 1997 in Australia
- 1997 in literature
- 1997 in poetry
- List of years in literature
- List of years in Australian literature
