= Patricia Bernard =

Australian writer of speculative fiction

- Born: 1942 (age 83–84); Melbourne, Australia
- Writing career
- Pen name: P. Scot-Bernard, Judy Bernard-Waite, Trish Bernard
- Genres: Speculative fiction, Travel Fiction, Non-fiction

Patricia Bernard (born 1942) is an Australian writer of speculative fiction.

== Biography ==
Patricia was born in 1938 in Melbourne, Australia. She left home at 15 to explore the United Kingdom.

Patricia's first work to be published was in 1981 under the pseudonym of Judy Bernard-Waite with The Riddle of the Trumpalar which was co-written with Judy Nunn and Fiona Waite. In 1983 she wrote her first solo book, We Are Tam, and in 1986 she, along with Nunn and Waite, wrote the sequel to The Riddle of the Trumpalar, entitled Challenge of the Trumpalar. From 1988 to 1999 Bernard wrote six more novels including The Outcast Trilogy and one piece of short-fiction which was featured in an anthology edited by Paul Collins. Book one of The Outcast Trilogy, The Outcast was a short-list nominee for the 1997 Aurealis Award for best young-adult novel but lost to Isobelle Carmody's Greylands and Eye to Eye by Catherine Jinks. During her life Bernard has travelled to many countries including Cuba where she was the first resident of New South Wales to be given a visa for Cuba.

== Bibliography ==
=== Series ===
The Trumpalar

- The Riddle of the Trumpalar (1981, as Judy Bernard-Waite) with Judy Nunn and Fiona Waite
- Challenge of the Trumpalar (1986, as Judy Bernard-Waite) with Judy Nunn and Fiona Waite

The Outcast Trilogy

- The Outcast (1997)
- The Punisher (1997)
- The Rule Changer (1998)

=== Other novels ===
- We Are Tam (1983)
- Aida's Ghost (1988)
- Dream Door of Shinar (1992)
- Jacaranda Shadow (1993)
- Deadly Sister Love (1999, as P. Scot-Bernard)
- Bladers Rule (2001)
- JB and the Worry Dolls (1994)
- Kangaroo Kids (1989)
- Sex is a Deadly Exercise (1987)
- Monkey Hill Gold (1992)
- Jacaranda Shadow (1993)
- Fords and Flying Machines: The Diary of Jack McLaren (2003)
- Stegosaur Stone (2004)
- The Mask (2005)
- Claw of the Dragon: The Diary of Billy Shanghai Hamilton (2008)
- Legends of the Three Moons (2013)
- Calling Up the Devil (1994)

=== Short fiction ===
- Spook Bus (1997) in Shivers: A Real Corpse
- Techno Terro (1999)
- Into The Future (2000)
- Basil Bigboots (2005)
- Galaxy 4 (2009)
- Ty the Terrific (2009
- Outer Space Spy (1992)
- Monster Builder (1996)
- No Sooks on the Starship (1998)
- Jumping Dogs and Jellyfish (1999)
- The Pizza Caper (1999)
- Wolfman (1999)
- The Stolen Giant Cheesecake (2000)
- Bladers Rule, or, The Stolen Bag Lady (2001)
- Dolphin Magic (2001)
- Marucs the mighty (2001)
- Cool Dude and Honey Magnet (2002)
- Splash, Dash, Smash! (2004)
- Queen of Crime Anthology (1999)
- Partners in Crime Anthology (2000)

=== Sparklers Asian Stories Set ===
- The Stolen Tea Tray (2014)
- Has Anyone Seen My Chook (2014)
- The Special Present (2014)
- Narama's Last Chance (2014)
- The Sacred Monkey (2014)
- The Paper Wish (2014)
- Race for a Motorbike (2014)
- Grandma Chau's Glasses (2014)
- Goat Girl, Garden Boy (2015)
- The Talking Hand Guest House (2015)
- Little Brother (2015)
- The Magic Stories (2015)
- Almost Twins (2015)
- Emilio and the Volcano (2015)
- Apricot Moon (2015)
- Humbug Mary (2015)

=== Non-fiction ===
- With the Kamasutra Under My Arm: An Indian Journey (2005)
- The You Can Do It! Little Book for Busy Students (1993)

=== Picture Books ===
- Duffy Everyone's Dog (1992)
- The Lost Tail (2013)
- Poddys Jumper (2023)

Source: ISFDB.org, WorldCat.org
