= Shade's Children =

1997 novel by Garth Nix

- Cover of the hardback, first edition
- Author: Garth Nix
- Cover artist: Elliot Earls (paperback edition)
- Language: English
- Genre: Science fiction, Fantasy novel
- Publisher: HarperCollins
- Publication date: September 1997
- Publication place: Australian
- Media type: Print (hardback & paperback)
- Pages: 310 (first edition, hardback)
- ISBN: 0-06-027324-0 (first edition, hardback) & ISBN 0-06-447196-9 (paperback edition)
- OCLC: 36246055
- Dewey Decimal: [Fic] 21
- LC Class: PZ7.N647 Sh 1997

Shade's Children is a young adult science fiction novel by Garth Nix. It was first published in Australia in 1997 by HarperCollins.

== Background ==
Shade's Children takes place in a not-so-distant future where evil Overlords have ruled for fifteen years due to a catastrophic "Change" which caused all people over the age of fourteen to simply disappear. Since then, the children have been rounded up and placed in prison-like dorms. No child may live past their fourteenth birthday (known as a "Sad Birthday"), when they are taken to the Meat Factory and their muscles, brain, and other organs are harvested to create creatures. These creatures are servants of the Overlords, and as such both fight in the Overlords' ceremonial territorial battles and hunt for the rare escapees who have managed to remove the tracer implanted in their wrist. There is only one exception to this rule: some young women are kept for "breeding" to maintain the supply of children, until a suggested maximum age of eighteen.

Escape is rare, based both on courage and ability. These teens are gifted, however, with "Change Talents" (side effects of the Change that are unique to each individual and generally fall into the category of psychic powers.) These talents are also dependent on Change Radiation, a mysterious field distributed by Change Projectors. This radiation allows the Overlords to control the weather and warp certain physical laws, which is critical for some creatures such as the Wingers, which would otherwise be too heavy to fly. The strength of the field is greatly weakened by water.

Several teams of escapees recruited by Shade live in a beached submarine, near a sewer pipe that allows access to an extensive sewer system. Shade is the only "adult" to have survived the Change. This, however, is mitigated by the fact that he is merely the uploaded consciousness of a real human scientist - a Dr. Robert Ingman. Shade knows that he is an uploaded consciousness and thus continually questions his humanity.

== Plot summary ==
A boy nicknamed Gold-Eye, a fifteen-year-old, was born near the time of the Change. He was physically affected by the Change radiation and his eyes, including his pupils, are a bright golden color. He has a very special talent known as being able to see in the "soon to be now." He is also unusual in that he managed to escape and elude the Trackers and Myrmidons for a time. Yet as the story begins, he is finally trapped by the Myrmidons, and prepares to kill himself to prevent his organs from being harvested. This turns out to be unnecessary as he is saved by a team of strangers who stun the Myrmidons with a flashbang grenade and lift him to safety. These strangers are a team of Shade's Children, and after the group eludes some Ferrets by hiding in a tall building, he accompanies them back to the Submarine, Shade's Children's hideout.

Gold-Eye joins Shade's Children, and is soon sent off on his first mission with the team that saved him: Ella, Ninde, and Drum. Each team member is unique, and has Change abilities that correspond somewhat to their personality.

This mission is a critical one: to retrieve the equipment and data from Shade's abandoned laboratory on the university campus in the Department of Abstract Computing, including a device that measures Change radiation. It is also one of the most dangerous missions: All of the teams who have previously attempted this retrieval have been killed or captured in the process. Ella's team is successful, even when the Overlord Black Banner surrounds and invades the building, alerted by Leamington, a pre-Change artificial intelligence who calls the police on detection of the intruders. Leamington is notably different from Shade in that he is an artificial intelligence as opposed to an uploaded consciousness.

After resting at the Sub, Shade unveils the reward created with the recovered data: metal crowns called Deceptors which scramble the sensory input of the Overlords' creatures, effectively making a human wearer invisible and non-olfactive to them as long as the power supply is maintained. It also is later revealed that scent trails are equally scrambled, although footprints are not. With this sudden new advantage and information, Shade is more curious about the method of distribution of Change radiation and sends Ella's team on a newer, even more dangerous mission: to steal a Change Projector from Fort Robertson, the stronghold of the Overlord named Red Diamond. This mission is not successful: on entry, the team discovers that the stronghold stretches underground, allowing for the unforeseen presence of creatures. The team's Deceptors run out prematurely as they discover a Myrmidon barracks, and they escape with a conch-shaped Overlord device called a Thinker, but without Drum who, having been winded, stays behind to fight. It is presumed by the rest of the team that he is killed.

On return to the Sub, however, Gold-Eye has a vision in which he sees Drum being stored temporarily in the Meat Factory, indicating that Drum is still alive. The group presents the device to Shade, who appreciates the Overlord device Ninde took from Fort Robertson but refuses a request to rescue Drum, as the Meat Factory is one of the most heavily guarded Overlord facilities.

The team, led by Ella, defies Shade's orders and infiltrates the Meat Factory, successfully rescuing Drum. They then leave cautiously, using the Deceptors to mask their trail. While resting among the branches of a large tree, Ninde telepathically detects an Overlord. The detection proves not only to be hard mentally on her since the Overlord is of human or greater intelligence, but also emotionally hard: Ninde discovers that the Overlords are essentially human. Despite the difficulty, she discovers that the Overlord may know something about "a mind in a machine" -a dangerous thing for them, since Shade - a machine intelligence- is their leader and benefactor. They continue, to discover on reaching the Submarine that it has been invaded by an Overlord, Red Diamond, and that all of the people inside have been killed or captured. Fortunately, Shade had realized long before that the Sub was not a permanent base, and established multiple supply caches throughout the city in case a team was stranded in the field or the Sub was taken. True to their training, the team heads immediately to the nearest cache - to discover Shade, who escaped, apparently by chance, while testing a mobile robotic body for himself based around the Thinker. Shade's escape is doubly fortuitous in that the Overlord used an electromagnetic pulse weapon to disable the Submarine; had he been within range of the weapon, he would have been incapacitated.

Despite the loss of all of Shade's Children except for Ella's team, the meeting is a good one: Shade has discovered how to defeat the Overlords. Examining and measuring Change radiation, he had discovered that all known Change Projectors were actually redistributors of Change radiation from a single source, a so-called Grand Projector. Were this projector destroyed, all creatures would cease to function, and the Overlords would likely be removed whence they came. Having discovered the source of the Change Radiation - at Mount Silverstone - they set out with Deceptors to find and destroy the source, which would hopefully bring reality back to normal.

But soon the team is betrayed by Shade, who had made a deal with the Overlords. Desiring a body with which to survive the Overlords' destruction (since the Thinker is also a product of the Change), he betrayed the children, bartering them and the knowledge of their Change talents in exchange for Overlord body technology (his Thinker is destroyed by an Overlord later). Gold-Eye and Ninde are taken prisoner. Ella and Drum, managing to escape, climb to the top of Mount Silverstone, meet a hologram of Shade, who though having been physically destroyed, is spread through the Overlords' computer systems. His original personality had been attempting to manifest itself, such as when Shade was speaking to Gold-Eye and Ninde about their fate at the hands of the Overlords, or when Shade was inwardly arguing with himself. However, it only managed to when the Thinker was destroyed. He guides them to the Grand Projector, when, about to disable it, they hear an Overlord approaching. Ella, desperate, destroys the Thinker which regulates the Grand Projector, causing it to overload. This has the positive effect of disabling all Overlord creatures and removing the Overlords, but exposes Ella and Drum to lethal amounts of Change radiation, killing them. The burst of Change radiation, while not lethal where Ninde and Gold-Eye are (they are being executed by an Overlord), enables them to respectively read the minds of thousands of newly freed children, and see a distant future, at which time he and Ninde are the parents of two children named for Ella and Drum. Ninde sends this "soon to be now" to Ella and Drum through her Change Talent, and those thoughts are the last things that they see.

== Characters in Shade's Children ==
=== Main characters ===
==== Shade ====
Shade was originally named Robert Ingman, who somehow managed to upload his consciousness into the machines and systems in his lair at a time before the Change occurred. He serves as a mentor to his Children, and sends them on missions for supplies and information. After transferring himself to the Thinker, Robert develops multiple personalities and one of these, "Shade", becomes so obsessed with gaining a human body that he does not care how many children must die or be captured for him to get one. His true personality, "Robert", tries to reason with Shade, but is usually over-ridden. While the Shade personality is obsessed with gaining a physical body, the true Robert attempts to proclaim his status as the original Robert Ingman personality, rather than the evil Thinker form. Once the Thinker is destroyed, the original Robert attempts to right the wrongs he has done to the children, regardless of the personal cost: his existence.

==== Ella ====
Ella, the leader of her group, is resourceful and strong but cold and withdrawn emotionally. Her Change Talent is the ability to summon or "conjure" inanimate objects of limited mass at will, usually weapons. This is how she escaped the Overlords' dormitories, conjuring a razor blade to cut a tracking device out of her wrist. She seems closest to Drum, and there is evidence of a romantic attachment to him, but his permanent emasculation by steroids prevents any sexual relationship. Ninde once remarks sarcastically, "Sure! And Ella will care about someone other than Drum!"

==== Ninde ====
Ninde is somewhat childish and watches many pre-Change movies to escape from her reality to that older world, into which she would probably be integrated well—she is emotional, dramatic, and attractive. Her Change Talent is telepathy: she can read minds within a limited level of complexity (she can't comfortably read human minds or Overlord minds) and distance, and tends to chew her knuckles when concentrating. She develops a romantic relationship with Gold-Eye over the course of the novel. After the Change was reversed, she studied to become a doctor.

==== Drum ====
Drum is an embodiment of physical strength and is described as having to use special clothing on account of his size (he is much bulkier than the average teenager), but has been emasculated by steroids given to him by the Overlords since he was to become a Myrmidon. Unfortunately for him, the steroids stopped him from going through puberty. His Change Talent is telekinesis, limited by mass.

==== Gold-Eye ====
Gold-Eye is constantly nervous and moving, still paranoid from his life spent constantly eluding the Trackers and Myrmidons that hunted him. His Change Talent is, unusually, not under his control, but comes to him in the form of visions of the future that he calls the "soon-to-be-now". Gold-Eye's English, both written and spoken, is bad after his years alone—he has not spoken to another human for some time as of the beginning of the novel, since his older brother Petar (probably a corruption of "Peter") and his brother's friend Jemmie are recaptured before the story begins. Gold-Eye is attracted to Ninde. At the end of the story, he has a vision showing that he and Ninde will have two children, named after Ella and Drum.

=== Minor characters ===
Alen

Lost on a fossicking mission around a month before the novel begins, Alen's sleeping body is discovered by Ella's team as they infiltrate the Meat Factory to rescue Drum, who was caught while covering Ella and the rest of her team's retreat on a previous mission. Ninde is in favor of rescuing him, but Ella makes the difficult decision to leave him behind.

Brat

Brat is a former operative of Shade and friend to Ella, who was captured by the Overlords around two years (according to Shade) before the start of the novel. When Stelo's team captures a Winger and, later, Shade vivisects it, this Winger is revealed to be Brat upon the removal of one particular device. Drum, a witness to the vivisection, kills him out of mercy almost immediately after this is revealed.

Lisa

Lisa was the leader of one of Shade's teams until nine years before the novel begins, when her entire team is lost attempting the university mission later accomplished by Ella's team. She was dedicated to Shade and his cause, much like Ella, and is furious when her teammate Sal suggests leaving the Sub rather than tackling the dangerous mission.

Mac

Mac was one of the oldest of Shade's Children when Ella first arrived at the Sub. At one point, his team retrieved hardware for Shade's computer. He was lost on the university mission two years before the book began.

Rick

Rick and his team were sent to the university prior to Ella's team. They were expected to return the day before Ella and her team began it. However, Rick is severely injured during the mission and never returns.

Sam Allen

Sam is supposedly captured at least nine years before the novel begins, after leaving the Sub in anger at Shade's ruthlessness. He is used in one of the elite Myrmidon guards that belong to no particular Overlord, which are ordered to drown Gold-Eye and Ninde near the end of the book. When the Change Projector is destroyed, the device controlling his brain is disabled, giving him a few moments of humanity during which he recites a small poem in English and tells Gold-Eye that he was once Sam Allen; after this, he falls into the water and dies due to the lack of Projector radiation energy.

Sim

Sim shows all of Shade's new recruits round the Sub, and seems to have some authority over the other children. He picks up on Gold-Eye's lack of sexual knowledge, and points him towards the relevant lessons.

Stelo

Stelo is the leader of one of the other teams and - initially - the target of Ninde's flirtation, despite no apparent attraction on his part and Shade's attempts to discourage Ninde. On orders from Shade, his team sets out to capture a Winger. Stelo pretends to be injured as part of this trap. The Winger they successfully catch is later revealed to be Brat. Following the mission in question, Stelo requires medical attention, having been scratched. Stelo and Marg survived the attack on the sub after Marg saw one of Shade's robots leaving and they decide to follow it. Stelo is shown carrying his dead teammate Peter and traveling with Marg through the sewer system. They encounter one of Shade's rat robots. Stelo begins to yell at the robot, and hits it, angry at Shade for a perceived betrayal. Shade then orders the rat robot to self-destruct.

=== The Overlords ===
The Overlords are evil beings from another dimension. They appear human but are subtly different. They view all life other than themselves as utterly worthless, referring repeatedly to humans as animals. As such, they have no moral problems with harvesting children's bodies to construct their creatures, for no purpose other than sadistic enjoyment of gladiatorial violence between the creatures.

They do not normally use audible speech to communicate, though they are capable of it. Instead, they subvocalize, using their technology to carry their speech among them. When they subvocalize, their throat muscles twitch noticeably.

There are three female and four male Overlords.

The Overlords disdain combat and never enter hand-to-hand combat themselves, but have a variety of technologically advanced weapons. Two are used by Overlords during the book: a "fusion lance:" a tube-shaped, laser-like ranged weapon, and an undescribed electromagnetic pulse weapon.

- Black Banner

The first Overlord featured. He wears black, spiked armour with a horned helmet. In conjunction with Red Diamond he plans to capture deceptor technology for use in battle. He expresses an interest in harvesting Gold Eye's abilities.

- Red Diamond

A highly aggressive male Overlord who wears a red armour and a fire-like cloak. He is greasy, fat, and balding. He is also attempting to capture deceptor technology for his use in battle.

- Blue Star

Very little is mentioned about Blue Star. Blue Star is the fourth male Overlord.

- Gold Claw

Apparently the oldest of the Overlords, Gold Claw, a female Overlord, is also quite arrogant.

- Silver Sun

An attractive female who wears mirrored armour, Silver Sun is very intelligent and sadistic. Her teeth are filed to points and she can speak English. When torturing Gold Eye and Ninde she explains that she lived among the humans for years as an infiltrator to prepare the way for the Change, and as such has the most familiarity with humans.

- Gray Crescent

An old male, Grey Crescent was asleep when Ninde and Gold-Eye were brought to see the Overlords.

- Emerald Crown

Emerald Crown, who dresses in flexible green metal armour and a crown of emerald spikes, is female.

=== List of creatures ===
The cover of this softcover edition is an artist's depiction of two Myrmidons and a Tracker in the Meat Factory.

The Overlords' creatures are numerous and vicious predators of several homogenous types. They are reasonably intelligent, being able to strategize and fear risks. This intelligence is particularly evident in the more advanced creations, such as the Myrmidons, which have a simple language. All of the creatures are created using human organs and body parts processed in the Meat Factory, and are heavily specialized for their purpose to the detriment of other attributes. Some creatures use amulet-shaped devices called "mind-calls" which allow for telepathic communication with fellow creatures or Overlords. Most, if not all, of the creature types have weaknesses or aversions exploited by the main characters.

- Drones

Drones are the Overlord's workers: although they do not have enhanced senses or any defense, these workers who maintain and run the Meat Factory (and presumably other Overlord facilities) are super-strong; they lift Drum without strain. They are only found in Overlord installations, where there are invariably others nearby to defend them. A standard size of Drone groups is not mentioned in the book, although when Ella, Ninde, and Gold-Eye infiltrated the Meat Factory, they met a pair of them together.

- Ferrets

Ferrets are similar to their real-life counterparts in appearance, but are notedly larger, more intelligent, and have hollow fangs with which to partially exsanguinate their victims. They are nocturnal, and seem to act merely as hunters of escapees rather than also fighting for the Overlords. They are mentioned to have great strength. Ferrets also have an affinity for underground locales, are afraid of heights, and hate water. They operate in "fangs" of five, and make hissing noises to communicate.

- Myrmidons

Myrmidons, unlike some of the other creatures, are humanoid: Larger than most, (the teens from which they are made are given steroids) these creatures are always seen wearing full armour and usually carry a mêlée weapon or a net gun, used to capture escapees. They have barrel chests, long arms, spade-shaped hands, and six fingers. They use fist-sized glowing globes called witchlights for light, and are mentioned as using "battle sprayers" that spray acid. They are the shock troops of the Overlords and the primary fighting units. The Myrmidons have a language for battlefield communication known as Battlespeech. They appear in "maniples" of seven.

- Myrmidon Masters

A Myrmidon Master is a larger, more intelligent Myrmidon which commands other Myrmidons. In the field, they are second in command only to a visiting Overlord. Myrmidon Masters are not generally seen in groups with other Myrmidon Masters, but rather among groups of the lesser Myrmidons.

- Screamers

Although no Screamers are ever seen in the book, they are heard - their scream is so loud as to be able to deafen and daze people far away from it. They are also the primary method of alarm for sleeping Myrmidons - only a Screamer can wake a Myrmidon quickly. They do not travel in groups. It is mentioned that when a human is close to the screamer while it screams it can peel away the skin on the insides of their ears.

- Trackers

Trackers are the scouts of Overlord forces - their noses, ears, and eyes are larger than normal and further enhanced with Overlord cyborg technology. They travel in "trios" of three, using whistling noises to indicate their status. They wear leather armor and do not fight unless attacked. At the beginning of the novel, one of the Trackers the team fights is a "Senior Tracker."

- Watchwards

No Watchwards are ever seen in the book, but they are mentioned several times. Drum, in his video recording, mentions having strangled one to escape the Training Ground. Ninde mentions that there are no Watchwards guarding the Meat Factory, and when the burglar alarm in Shade's old lab is set off, a "vaguely human creature" with a mind-call is mentioned as having received the alarm. Watchwards are most likely sentries and guards in the Dorms and other Overlord installations.

- Wingers

Wingers are flying creatures resembling humanoid bats. They have no nose, and their lower jaw is extended for enhanced killing ability. As with the other creatures, a mind control unit is kept near its brain, which forbids human thoughts and speech (although speech becomes difficult anyway due to the repositioning of the mouth). When one Winger has this removed, it recognizes Ella and pleads for death. Wingers use Change energy anti-gravity boosters to help them fly, since they are theoretically too heavy to fly. There are also special, vehicle-sized Wingers used as the personal flying mounts of Overlords. Normal Wingers appear in "flights" of nine.

== Main themes ==
The book is about survival at all costs against a seemingly invincible foe. Shade's increasing lack of humanity is a constant threat to the reader and characters in the book. Ninde and Gold-Eye's growing relationship throughout the story is a touching account of love against adversity. In contrast to this, Drum and Ella are more serious about the situation they are in. However, they are constantly supporting each other and provide comfort at the end of the novel. Ella is a strong leader, yet her respect for her teammates, especially Ninde, grows considerably during the book's events. One interesting literary device are the interludes between the chapters. They add to the book's depth, provide the readers with extra information and sometimes reveal events elsewhere. For instance, when the Sub is attacked by creatures, the interlude is part of the training session for creature attacks. All interludes are taken from Shade's computer archive.

The book also touches on the idea of humans being the lesser race. Interaction with the Overlords finds them considering humans as animals, bred for their amusement and violent battles, lesser in mind and speech.

== Awards ==
Shade's Children was a short-list nominee for the 1997 Aurealis Award for best young-adult novel but lost to Catherine Jinks' Eye to Eye and Isobelle Carmody's Greylands. It is also an ALA Notable Book. The book won the 1998 Golden Duck Award.

== Release details ==
- 1997, USA, HarperCollins (ISBN 0-06-027324-0), Pub date September ? 1997, hardback (First edition)
- 1998, USA, Eos (ISBN 0-06-447196-9), Pub date October ? 1998, paperback
- 1999, USA, Rebound by Sagebrush (ISBN 0-613-10529-X), Pub date ? October 1999, hardback (library edition)
- 2006, USA, HarperCollins Children's Books (ISBN 0-00-723212-8), Pub date August 7, 2006, hardback
- 2006, UK, HarperCollins, Pub date August 7, 2006, hardback
