= David McCooey =

- Born: 1967 (age 58–59); London, United Kingdom
- Occupations: Poet, critic, musician, and academic

David McCooey (born 1967 in London), poet, critic, musician, and academic. He is Personal Chair in Literary Studies and Professional & Creative Writing at Deakin University in Geelong.

== Early life and education ==
David McCooey was born in London in 1967. He moved to Perth, Western Australia, with his family in 1970. He studied for a BA (hons) at University of Western Australia (1985–1988), and completed his doctorate at Sydney University (1990–1993).

== Career ==
McCooey is Personal Chair in Literary Studies and Professional & Creative Writing at Deakin University in Geelong and regularly writes reviews for Australian Book Review and The Age. He has been the recipient of a number of ARC (Australian Research Council) awards. From 2004 to 2006 he was associate editor of Space: New Writing and in 2013 he was inaugural poetry editor of Australian Book Review.

McCooey is described by Nicholas Birns in The Australian as "one of the pioneers of Australian studies of life writing". Supported by his first wife, McCooey authored a key critical work in Australian autobiography, Artful Histories: Modern Australian Autobiography, which was published by Cambridge University Press in 1996, and re-published in 2009. Artful Histories won a NSW Premier's Literary Award in 1996, and was shortlisted for the Colin Roderick Award for Best Australian Book in 1997.

McCooey's first poetry collection, Blister Pack (Salt Publishing), won the 2006 Mary Gilmore Award, and was shortlisted for four other major awards. McCooey is the Deputy General Editor of the Macquarie PEN Anthology of Australian Literature (Allen & Unwin, published internationally by Norton as The Literature of Australia), which won the "Special Award" in the 2010 NSW Premier's Literary Awards and a 2010 Australian Educational Publishing Award. McCooey's latest book of poetry Outside (Salt Publishing) was published in 2011, and in 2012 it was shortlisted for the Queensland Literary Awards and was a finalist for the Melbourne Prize for Literature's "Best Writing" award. In her review of Outside in The Australian, Fiona Wright commented on the collection's "remarkable power to draw the reader in" and its "shifting and subtle exploration of creativity". McCooey's poetry has appeared widely in Australian journals, newspapers, and anthologies, including The Best Australian Poems annual anthology in 2006, 2007, 2008, 2009, 2011, 2012, 2013, 2014, 2015, 2016, and 2017 (the final year of the series). His "poetry soundtracks" (original poetry, music, and sound design) have appeared in various CD issues of literary journals, and have been broadcast on ABC Radio National, 3RRR and elsewhere. An album of poetry soundtracks, Outside Broadcast, was released as a digital download in 2013. His third full-length collection of poetry, Star Struck was published by UWA Publishing in 2016. Writing in The Australian, Geoff Page described the collection as "disturbingly good and arguably his best so far", concluding that it is an example of "contemporary Australian poetry at its engaging best". The Book of Falling, McCooey's fourth full-length collection of poetry, was published in 2023 by Upswell. In addition to lyric poetry, the collection includes three "photo poems", featuring found photographs and photographs by McCooey. A photograph by McCooey is also used for the book's cover art. John Kinsella, writing in The Saturday Paper described "McCooey's gift" as his "control of tone", noting "an uncanny sense of that dynamic of distance and intimacy in which McCooey is so proficient".

McCooey is now married to the writer and academic Maria Takolander.

== Awards and nominations ==
- 2012 Finalist, Melbourne Prize for Literature's "Best Writing Award", for Outside
- 2012 Short-listed, Queensland Literary Awards (Poetry), for Outside
- 2010 New South Wales Premier's Literary Awards for the Macquarie PEN Anthology of Australian Literature
- 2010 Winner, Australian Educational Publishing Awards, Tertiary (Wholly Australian) Scholarly Reference, for the Macquarie PEN Anthology of Australian Literature
- 2010 Short-listed, Australian Book Industry Awards, General Non-Fiction, for the Macquarie PEN Anthology of Australian Literature
- 2006 Winner, Mary Gilmore Award for the best first book of poetry in the preceding two calendar years for Blister Pack
- 2006 Finalist, the Melbourne Prize for Literature (New Writing Award), for Blister Pack
- 2005 Short-listed, New South Wales Premier's Literary Awards for Blister Pack
- 2005 Short-listed, Western Australian Premier's Book Awards for Blister Pack
- 2005 Short-listed, The Age Book of the Year Award for Blister Pack
- 1997 Short-listed, Colin Roderick Award for Best Australian Book, for Artful Histories: Modern Australian Autobiography
- 1996 Winner, New South Wales Premier's Literary Awards, Gleebooks Prize for Critical Writing, for Artful Histories: Modern Australian Autobiography

== Publications ==
=== Poetry ===
- The Book of Falling (2023)
- Star Struck (2016)
- Outside (2011)
- Graphic (2010)
- Blister Pack (2005)

=== Audio ===
- The Apartment (with Paul Hetherington, 2018)
- The Double (2017)
- Outside Broadcast (2013)

=== Anthology ===
As Deputy General Editor: Macquarie PEN Anthology of Australian Literature (2009), published internationally as The Literature of Australia (2009)

=== Literary criticism ===
Artful Histories: Modern Australian Autobiography (1996)

== Professional associations ==
- American Association of Australian Literary Studies
- Antipodes: The North American Journal of Australian Literature Life Writing
- Association for the Study of Australian Literature
