= The Wild Reply =

1997 Australian poetry collection by Emma Lew

- Author: Emma Lew
- Language: English
- Genre: Poetry collection
- Publisher: Black Pepper
- Publication date: 1997
- Publication place: Australia
- Media type: Print
- Pages: 56 pp
- Awards: 1997 Dinny O'Hearn Poetry Prize, joint winner; 1998 Mary Gilmore Prize, winner
- ISBN: 1876044136

The Wild Reply is the debut collection of poems by Australian poet Emma Lew, published by Black Pepper in 1997.

The collection contains 56 poems from a variety of sources.

The book was joint winner of the Dinny O'Hearn Poetry Prize in 1997, with Dragons in Their Pleasant Palaces by Peter Porter, and winner of the 1998 Mary Gilmore Prize for a First Book of Poetry.

== Contents ==
- "Of Quite Another Order"
- "Afterlife"
- "Procedure"
- "In the Busy and Populous Belgium of Yesterday"
- "Holes and Stars"
- "Mythic Bird of Panic"
- "Alliance IV"
- "Berchtesgaden"
- "Cheap Silhouette"
- "The Baby's Diamonds"
- "Chernobyl: Small Talk"
- "They Flew Me in on the Concorde from Paris"
- "Caught in the Act of Admiring Myself"
- "Goodbye to Maybe"
- "Message"
- "The Power of Loose Change"
- "I'm Being Blackmailed Again"
- "Multiple Kronstadts"
- "Latecomer"
- "Trench Music"
- "Broken Coast"
- "The Way Out of Hungary"
- "Before Heraldry"
- "My Adventurer"
- "Accountancy"
- "Aubade"
- "Facts About You"
- "Remnant of Sunset"
- "Pleiades"
- "Sugar King"
- "New Moon"
- "Pond"
- "The Last Colours"
- "Words for Night"
- "Lumber"
- "Squall"
- "Don't be Miserable"
- "Little Sister"
- "The Truth about Love Fearlessly Told"
- "How Like You"
- "In a Sense All His Voyages Were Failures"
- "Small Stakes"
- "Lace Trade"
- "Infamous Poem"
- "Evolution of Rogues"
- "The Tides"
- "Neptune Street"
- "Earlier Cartographers of the Moon"
- "Bungalows"
- "Thebes"
- "Coal"
- "The Understudy"
- "The Wild Reply"
- "Cartouche"
- "City of Light"
- "The Recidivist"

== Critical reception ==
In her review of the book for the Age Book of the Year Awards judge Gig Ryan noted that the book "has an astonishing originality in its vivacious imperatives". She concluded that the author's "brisk, puzzling intelligent narrators have not been heard before."

== Awards ==
- 1997 Dinny O'Hearn Poetry Prize, joint winner
- 1997 Kenneth Slessor Prize for Poetry, shortlisted
- 1998 Mary Gilmore Prize for a First Book of Poetry, winner

== Notes ==
- Dedication: For the memory of my mother, Frances Lew, and my grandmother, Greta Wahl.

== See also ==
- 1997 in Australian literature
