= Quinn Eades =

Researcher

- Alma mater: University of Newcastle; University of Technology Sydney; University of Melbourne; La Trobe University
- Occupation: Researcher; poet
- Awards: Mary Gilmore Award (2018); XYZ Prize for Spoken Word (2017)
- Website: scholars.latrobe.edu.au/display/qeades
- Academic career
- Fields: Queer theory, transgender studies, poetry, autobiography, human body
- Institutions: La Trobe University (2015–); La Trobe University (2012–2015)

Quinn Eades is a Senior Lecturer in Gender, Sexuality & Diversity Studies, best known for both academic work and poetry on queer theory and experience. He is particularly known for integrating his trans-masculine perspective into both academic and personal writing.

== Early life and education ==
After studying a BA in sociology at University of Newcastle from 1993-2000, he studied creative writing, gaining a graduate certificate from University of Technology Sydney in 2003 and a postgraduate diploma from University of Melbourne in 2010. He did his PhD from 2011 to 2015 in English and gender studies under Sue Martin at La Trobe University, also publishing a collection of poems as a companion volume.

== Career and impact ==
During his PhD, he founded the interdisciplinary gender, sexuality and diversity academic journal: Writing from Below in 2012, and is currently the co-managing editor. He also worked as a sessional lecturer in interdisciplinary studies, being made a full lecturer upon being awarded his PhD in 2015 and subsequently made senior lecturer in gender, sexuality & diversity studies.

It was also in 2015 that he began transitioning to be a non-binary trans masculine person at the age of 41, whilst completing a PhD thesis and having recently given birth to his youngest child. He draws significantly on this experience in both his academic writing and poetry, for example his experience of male motherhood.

Alongside his academic work, he is also known for his published poetry. He employs a hybrid writing style; mixing academic writing on queer and trans theory with poetry and autobiography.

== Awards and honours ==
- Association for the Study of Australian Literature's 2018 Mary Gilmore Award.
- Arts Queensland's 2017 XYZ Prize for Spoken Word.

== Works ==
- Eades, Quinn (2017). Rallying. Crawley, Western Australia. ISBN 978-1-74258-919-0. OCLC 962355415.
