= Judy Nunn =

Australian actress and author (born 1945)

Judy Nunn AM
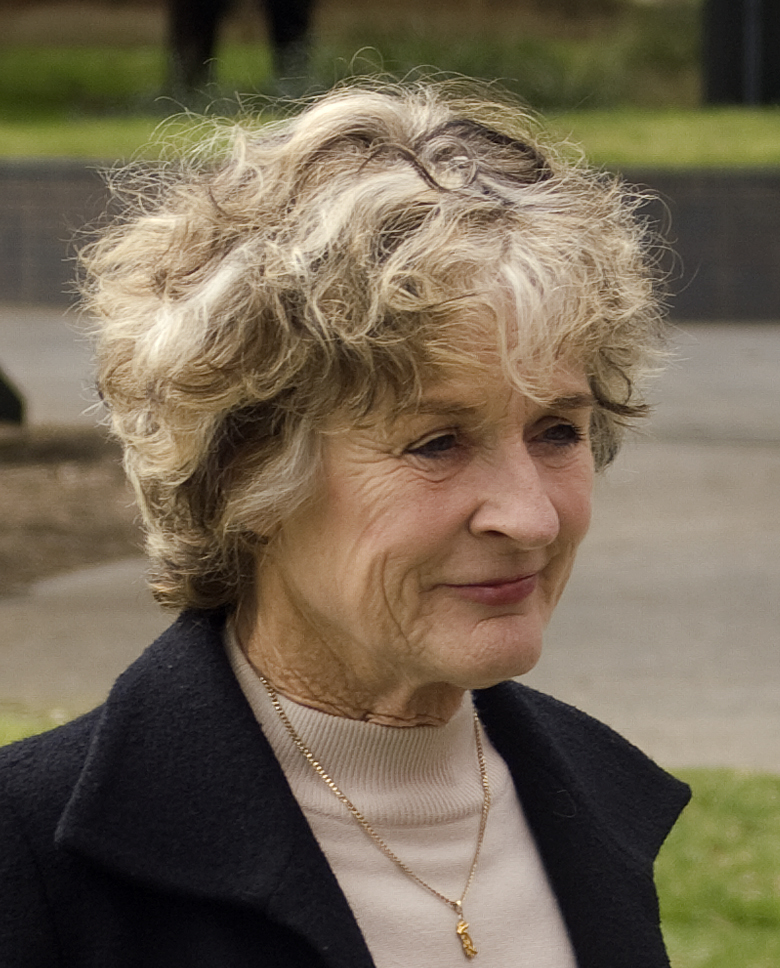
- Nunn in 2010
- Born: Judith Anne Nunn; 13 April 1945 (age 81); Perth, Western Australia
- Other name: Judy Bernard-Waite (pen name)
- Occupations: Author; Actress; Radio and Television Screenwriter
- Years active: 1964–2003 (acting); 1981–present (author)
- Notable work: The Box as Vicki Stafford (1974–1977); Sons and Daughters as Dr. Irene Fisher (1984–1986); Prisoner as Joyce Martin (1979); Home and Away as Ailsa Hogan/Stewart (1988–2000, 2002–2003)
- Spouse: Bruce Venables (m. 1988)
- Website: https://judynunn.com.au

Judith Anne Nunn (born 13 April 1945), also published under the pen name of Judy Bernard-Waite, is an Australian retired actress, and author of both adult and children's fiction titles. She has collaborated with writers Patricia Bernard and Fiona Waite.

Nunn is a former theatre and television actress and radio and television screenwriter for nearly 50 years, best known for her roles as Vicki Stafford The Box, Irene Fisher on Sons and Daughters, and her 15-year tenure in TV soap opera Home and Away as original character Ailsa Hogan.

Nunn was appointed a Member of the Order of Australia in the 2015 Australia Day Honours for her service to the performing arts as a scriptwriter and actor of stage and screen, and to literature as an author.

== Career ==
=== Acting ===
Nunn worked for many years as a leading stage actress, starting in 1964.

Her breakout television role was in the risque soap opera The Box, as scheming bisexual reporter Vicki Stafford. Her character became a popular cult figure in the series and Nunn continued in the role for the show's entire 1974–1977 three year run and reprised in the feature film version in 1975.

In 1979, she briefly played Joyce Martin in the Australian TV series Prisoner, followed by Dr. Irene Fisher in television serial Sons and Daughters from 1984 until 1986.

Nunn is known for her role as original character Ailsa Stewart in the soap opera Home and Away, from 1988 until the character was killed off in 2000 after deciding to leave the series to devote more time with novels. In 2002, she returned in a guest role playing the same character – it transpired this was actually an hallucination of her former on-screen husband, Alf Stewart, caused by a brain tumour.

=== Screenwriting ===
Nunn is a screenwriter of radio and television, as well as an author. She has written scripts for television series Neighbours and Possession.

=== Literary career ===
In the 1980s, Nunn decided to turn her hand to prose. The result was two adventure novels for children, Eye in the Storm and Eye in the City, which remain popular in Australia and Europe.

Embarking on adult fiction in the early 1990s, Judy's three novels, The Glitter Game, Centre Stage and Araluen, set respectively in the worlds of television, theatre and film, became bestsellers. A specialist in Australian period fiction, other books she has written include Kal, Beneath the Southern Cross, Territory, Pacific, Heritage, Floodtide, Maralinga, Tiger Men in 2011, Elianne in 2013 and Spirits of the Ghan in 2015.

In May 2025, Magi Pictures had acquired the rights of Nunn's novel Khaki Town.

== Personal life ==
Nunn attended Presbyterian Ladies' College, Perth. She married her husband, actor and writer and former Tasmanian & Royal Hong Kong police officer Bruce Venables, the same week in which she filmed her character Ailsa's marriage to Alf (Ray Meagher) in Home and Away in 1988. Formerly long-time residents of Bondi, New South Wales, Nunn and her husband now reside on the Central Coast, New South Wales.

== Filmography ==
=== Film ===
Acting
Year	Title	Role	Type
1975	The Box	Vicki Stafford	Feature film
1978	Bit Part	Jo	TV movie
1978	The Newman Shame	Veronica	TV movie
1983	Hostage: The Christine Meresch Story	Mrs. Lewis	Feature film
1983	David Copperfield	Voice	Animated TV film
1983	Sherlock Holmes and the Valley of Fear	Voice	Animated film
1983	Sherlock Holmes and a Study in Scarlet	Voice	Animated film
1983	Outbreak of Hostilities	Edna Starling	TV movie
1984	Crime of the Decade	Rolly's Mother	TV movie
1985	The Pickwick Papers	Voice	Animated TV film

=== Television ===
Acting
Year	Title	Role	Type
	Z-Cars		TV series, 1 episode
1971	The Onedin Line	Woman	TV series, Season 1, Episode 12: "Cry of the Blackbird"
1972	The Befrienders	Mother	TV series, Season 1, Episode 7: "Lots of Friends in the Big City"
1974	Matlock Police	Stella Davis	TV series, Episode: "The Prowler"
1974–1977	The Box	Vicki Stafford	Seasons 1–6, 206 episodes
1979	Prisoner	Joyce Martin	TV series, Season 1, 9 episodes
1980	Skyways	Bessie Langhurst	TV series, 2 episode: "The Return of Bessie Langhurst"
1981	Holiday Island	Ruby Palmer	TV series, 1 episode 42: "The Great Frederico"
1982	A Country Practice	Nancy Brewer	TV series, Season 2, Episodes 23 & 24:"Shootin' Through" (2 episodes)
1984–86	Sons and Daughters	Irene Fisher	Seasons 3–5, 150 episodes
1988–2000, 2002–03	Home and Away	Ailsa Stewart (née Hogan)	Seasons 1–13 (main), Seasons 15–16 (recurring) (1313 episodes)
Self appearances
Year	Title	Role	Notes
1978	The Mike Walsh Show	Guest - Herself with Lois Ramsay	TV series, 1 episode
1978	The Mike Walsh Show	Guest - Herself	TV series, 1 episode
1995	Good Morning Australia	Guest	TV series, 1 episode
1996	Midday with Kerri-Anne	Guest	TV series, 1 episode
1996	Monday to Friday	Guest	TV series, 1 episode
1996	Burke's Backyard	Guest	TV series, 1 episode
1996	Good Morning Australia	Guest	TV series, 1 episode
1997	Surprise Surprise	Guest	Light entertainment show, 1 episode
1998	E! News	Herself	TV series, 1 episode
1999	Denise	Guest	TV series, 1 episode
2000	The Morning Show	Guest	TV series, 1 episode
2001–02	Beauty and the Beast	Panellist	Panel show
2001	Ground Zero	Herself	TV series, 1 episode
2002	This Is Your Life - Judy Nunn	Herself	TV series, 1 episode
2002	The Best of Aussie Drama	Herself	Documentary
2006	It Takes Two	Contestant	Music competition show, 3 episodes
2006	Where Are They Now?	Herself	TV series, 1 episode
2011	The Morning Show	Herself	TV series, 1 episode
2012	First Tuesday Book Club	Panellist	Panel Show, 1 episode
2014–15	The Daily Edition	Guest	TV series, 1 episode
2015, 2016, 2022	Studio 10	Guest	TV series, 3 episodes
2015–21	A Current Affair	Guest	TV series
2015	The Daily Edition	Guest	TV series, 1 episode
2016	The Daily Edition	Guest	TV series, 1 episode
2018	Endless Summer: 30 Years of Home and Away	Herself	Video Documentary
2018	News Breakfast	Guest	TV series, 1 episode
2018	Weekend Sunrise	Guest	TV series, 1 episode
2020	7.30	Guest	TV series, 1 episode
2021,2023	A Current Affair	Guest	TV series, 1 episode
2021	Today Extra	Guest	TV series, 1 episode
2022	This Is Your Life: Ray Meagher	Herself	TV series, 1 episode
2023	Lest We Forget	Herself	TV special
2023	A Current Affair	Herself	TV series, 1 episode
2024	The Morning Show	Herself	TV series, 1 episode
Additional credits
Year	Title	As	Notes
1985	Possession	Writer	
1985	Neighbours	Writer	Season 1 (3 episodes)

== Bibliography ==
=== Children’s fiction ===
Year	Title	Notes
1981	The Riddle of the Trumpalar	(as Judy Bernard-Waite) with Patricia Bernard and Fiona Waite)
1986	Challenge of the Trumpalar	(as Judy Bernard-Waite) with Patricia Bernard and Fiona Waite
1988	Eye in the Storm	
1991	Eye in the City	

=== Adult ===
Year	Title	ISBN
1991	The Glitter Game	
1994	Center Stage	
1994	Araluen	
1996	Kal	
1999	Beneath the Southern Cross	
2002	Territory	
2004	Pacific	
2005	Heritage	
2008	Floodtide	
2009	Maralinga	
2011	Tiger Men	
2013	Elianne	
2015	Spirits of the Ghan	
2017	Sanctuary	
2019	Khaki Town	ISBN 9780143795186
2022	Showtime!	ISBN 9781761042546
2022	A Poem for Sally	ISBN 9780143777076
2023	Black Sheep	ISBN 9781761340123
2023	The Long Weekend (short story collection)	ISBN 9781761344619
2024	The Otto Bin Empire	

== Sources ==
- Nunn, Judy (27 November 2004). "Prime time for peeping Toms". The Weekend Australian. p. 21.
