= Spirits of the Ghan =

Book by Judy Nunn

- First edition
- Author: Judy Nunn
- Language: English
- Publisher: Random House Australia
- Publication date: 2015
- Publication place: Australia
- Media type: Print (Paperback)

Spirits of the Ghan is 2015 Australian novel by writer Judy Nunn. It is Nunn's thirteenth novel. The book was inspired by a journey that Nunn took on the Ghan.

== Overview ==
The novel follows the final stages of the completion of the Ghan railway line across central Australia. It focuses on the characters of Jessica Manning, a negotiator who engages with the local Aboriginal inhabitants, and Matthew Witherton, the leader of a survey team tasked with ensuring the railway line is completed.
