= Mary Gilmore Award =

Australian award for the best first book of poetry

The Mary Gilmore Award is currently an annual Australian literary award for poetry, awarded by the Association for the Study of Australian Literature. Since being established in 1956 as the ACTU Dame Mary Gilmore Award, it has been awarded in several other categories, but has been confined to poetry since 1985. It was named in honour of writer and journalist Mary Gilmore (1865–1962).

== History ==
The Mary Gilmore Award was established in 1956 by the Australian Council of Trade Unions (ACTU) as the ACTU Dame Mary Gilmore Award to encourage literature "significant to the life and aspirations of the Australian people". Over the years it has been awarded for a range of categories, including novels, poetry, a three-act (full-length) play, and a short story.

In 1959 it was organised by the May Day Committees of Melbourne, Sydney and Newcastle in partnership with the New Theatre in Newtown, Sydney, as an award for the best new play.

The Mary Gilmore Award for a First Book of Poetry was established in 1985, named in honour of the Australian writer and journalist Dame Mary Gilmore. Since 2022 it has been known simply as the Mary Gilmore Award.

The award currently conducted by the Association for the Study of Australian Literature and given to a first book of poetry published in Australia in the previous year. From 1998 to 2016, it was awarded every two years; prior to 1998 it was awarded annually.

== Poetry ==
Past winners of the poetry prize include:

- 2026: Liv Moriarty Gravity and Gravel (No More Poetry)
- 2025: Hasib Hourani Rock Flight (Giramondo)
- 2024: Dan Hogan Secret Third Thing (Cordite Books)
- 2023: Harry Reid Leave Me Alone (Cordite Books)
- 2022: Jelena Dinic In the Room with the She Wolf (Wakefield Press)
- 2021: Em König Breathing Plural (Cordite Books)
- 2020: Thom Sullivan Carte Blanche (Vagabond Press)
- 2019: Marjon Mossammaparast That Sight (Cordite Books)
- 2018: Quinn Eades Rallying (UWA Publishing)
- 2017: Aden Rolfe False Nostalgia (Giramondo Publishing)
- 2016: Benedict Andrews Lens Flare (Pitt Street Poetry)
- 2014: Rose Lucas Even in the Dark (UWA Publishing)
- 2012: Fiona Wright Knuckled (Giramondo Publishing)
- 2010: Joanna Preston The Summer King (Otago University Press)
- 2008: Nathan Shepherdson Sweeping the Light Back Into the Mirror (University of Queensland Press)
- 2006: David McCooey Blister Pack (Salt Publishing)
- 2004: Michael Brennan Imageless World (Salt Publishing)
- 2002: Geraldine McKenzie Duty (Paper Bark Press)
- 2000: Lucy Dougan Memory Shell (Five Islands Press)
- 1998: Emma Lew The Wild Reply (Black Pepper Publishing)
- 1997: Morgan Yasbincek Night Reversing (Fremantle Press)
- 1996: Jordie Albiston Nervous Arcs (Spinifex Press)
- 1995: Aileen Kelly Coming Up for Light (Pariah Press)
- 1994: Deborah Staines Now, Millennium (Spinifex Press)
- 1993: Jill Jones The Mask and Jagged Star (Hazard Press)
- 1992: Alison Croggon This is the Stone (Penguin Books)
- 1991: Jean Kent Verandahs (Hale & Iremonger)
- 1990: Kristopher Rassemussen In the Name of the Father (False Frontiers)
- 1989: Alex Skovron The Re-arrangement (Melbourne University Press)
- 1988: Judith Beveridge The Domesticity of Giraffes (Black Lightning Press)
- 1987: Jan Owen Boy with Telescope (Angus & Robertson)
- 1986: Stephen J. Williams A Crowd of Voices (Pariah Press)
- 1985: Doris Brett The Truth about Unicorns (Jacaranda Press)

== See also ==
- List of poetry awards
- List of years in poetry
- List of years in literature
