= Mabo: Life of an Island Man =

1997 Australian documentary film by Trevor Graham

- Directed by: Trevor Graham
- Distributed by: Film Australia
- Release date: June 13, 1997
- Running time: 87 minutes
- Country: Australia
- Language: English

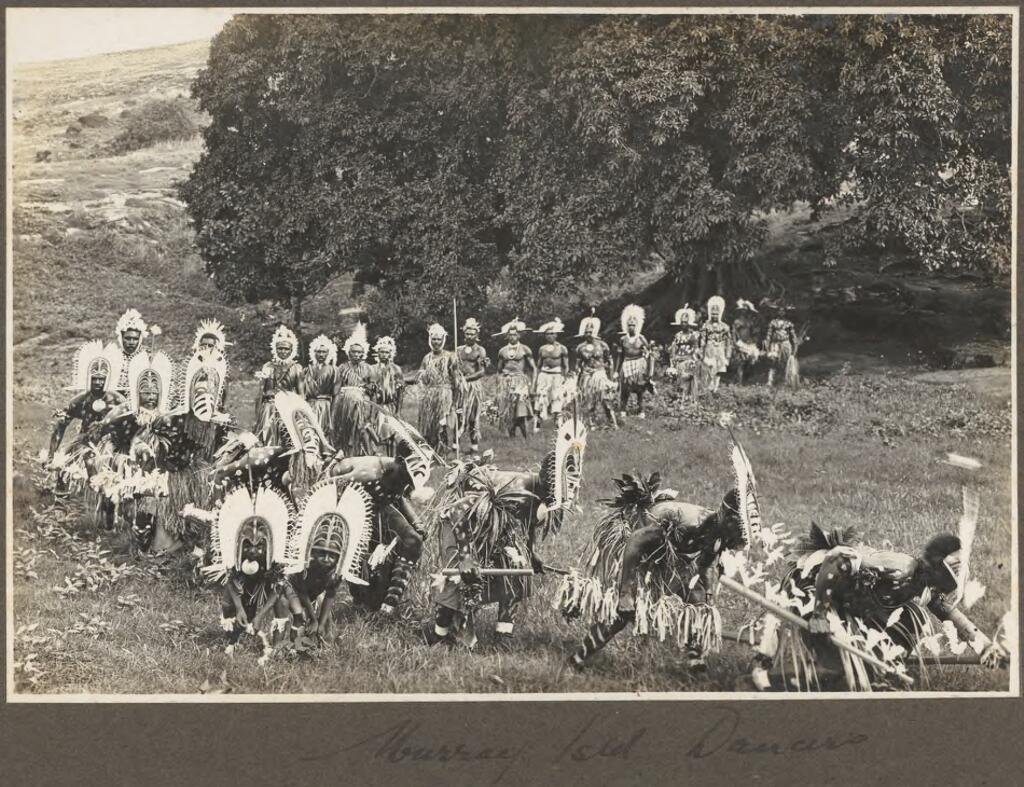
Traditional dancing on Murray Island, Eddie Mabo's place of birth.

Mabo: Life of an Island Man is a 1997 Australian documentary film on the life of Indigenous Australian land rights campaigner Eddie Koiki Mabo, directed by Trevor Graham.

It was awarded Best Documentary at the Australian Film Institute Awards and the Sydney Film Festival. It also received the Script Writing Award at the New South Wales Premier's Literary Awards.

== Background ==
Although, Eddie Mabo's name is recognisable in the Australian household and part of the nation's identity the purpose of the film was to provide a face to the name. By placing an emphasis on faces as a metaphor, director Trevor Graham reconstructs a more personal and intimate version of Mabo, Graham portrays him as a man, husband and respected Indigenous leader. The biographical movie details a chronological portrayal of Eddie Mabo's life, his upbringing and continual struggle for land rights. The film is a combination of archival footage and family interviews spanning since spanning a time period from 1989 until its release in 1997.

== Synopsis ==
The film starts off with the first act titled "Piadarma Man", which roughly translates to "Island Man" and reviews Eddie Mabo through the eyes of his immediate family and friends. He is portrayed as a generous and loving family man concerned with the wellbeing of his people. During this section of the film, there are several interviews from friends and relatives. Initially, the audience is introduce to Mabo's neighbours in Townsville, George and Cath Carter briefly mention their longstanding friendship. Margaret Reynolds (friend) describes his character as "political person whereas Gail (Mabo’s daughter) describes him as a "radical" and determined. As shown, he is depicted as family oriented person but also as a typical Australian battler. Following this, Graham portrays the relaxing and frugal lifestyle of the Torres Strait Islander people, the obvious connection between culture and land immediately reveals itself. The audience is presented with Jack Wailu (close friend) one of Mabo's neighbours on Mer; who consequently performs at Mabo's final celebratory funeral towards the film. Throughout the interviews, there is constant switching between archival photographs and footage of local island activities, such as land cultivation and tribal rituals. Another important individual is James Rice (cousin) who briefly discusses the traditional stories and dances conducted. After this, the audience is introduced to a photograph of Benny Mabo (Mabo's uncle) and Magai Mabo (aunt) who via traditional ‘blood relation adoption’ become Mabo's adoptive parents. The segment following this short family history describes the white occupation of Murray Island in 1879. At this time, Robert Miles (Mabo's school teacher) recognised Mabo's intelligence and determination, encouraging Mabo's rudimentary learning of English when he was 14. As a young man Mabo was exiled from the island having broken customary Island laws by having an altercation with a young girl. His encounter with a girl in conjunction with his newfound ambition meant that Mabo began to question not only the imposition of Queensland law on his personal crime, but also the question of white rule on all Mer people. After this incident, Mabo began working on the Torres Strait pearling fleets where he witness an injustice of lower pay towards Indigenous workers in comparison with Malaysian/Europeans. He then worked a variety of labouring jobs in Cairns, including a Queensland railway track worker, a sugar cane cutter and fettler. It was on 10 October 1959 that he married his current wife Bonita (Netta) Neehow. The film provides a quick vignette into their romance and yet hardship as a family surviving in northern Queensland.

Through the usage of the campus library and presentations in professor Noel Loos’(friend) racial relations class, Mabo began his journey in academic life. It was at James Cook University that Mabo also formed a friendship with historian Henry Reynolds (friend) who fostered Mabo's interest in land rights and ownership. During this time, Mabo also worked at the harbour in which the unions combined with communist party street meetings furthered his interest in racial equality. In 1967 after the Aboriginal Referendum campaign in which Indigenous people were recognised, Mabo started conducting interracial seminars with the purpose of Aboriginal advancement in the areas of education, employment and housing. This montage of political footage and photographs is when interviewee Margaret Reynolds reveals that the seminars were indeed monitored and Mabo's alleged paranoia of the Queensland Government was rightly appropriate.

Following this, he began a string of activism and participated in many political campaigns. In light of the election of Labour Prime Minister Gough Whitlam in 1972, an influx of Commonwealth funding which allowed Mabo to engage in several projects such as the Yumba-Meta Housing Association, Aboriginal Task Force, Department of Aboriginal Affairs, and other legal/health co-operative services. However, despite all his political success and aligned with the film's purpose to provide a personal portrayal of Mabo's life, he is also shown to have troubles with alcoholism and domestic abuse within the household. It is at this moment when Bonita reveals that Eddie was routinely violent when drunk and he "took it out on me". Additionally, Bonita states that Eddie was also "sitting there crying" due to stress to show his emotional capacity as a human being. After this, Mabo's daughter discusses how her father would overcome this issue by getting up to dance and everyone else would "join in with him singing". The film then uses the tribal music to transition into a montage of Mer and Mabo's watercolour paintings to reveal how he was "homesick".

In the similar vein of cultural preservation the documentary then focuses on year of 1973 in which Mabo opened the first Black Community School in South Townsville. In some black and white archival footage of classes at JCU, Mabo states that individuals especially Indigenous people must "retain [their] identity", and his will not be able to pass on traditional customs or language to his children when he dies. As a result, with the help of his wife Bonita and cousin Donald Whaleboat, Mabo creates a school with the intention of Indigenous cultural preservation and teaching. At this point, through the narration, director Trevor Graham makes a statement that those Indigenous children have "learned white culture…and lost their own". The independent education system showed that an Indigenous curriculum provided by elders and supplemented by white teachers was beneficial. However, due to educational bureaucracy and scrutiny via the Townsville Daily Bulletin, the school was closed. Additionally, as shown in the film, there was also backlash from other Aboriginal communities based in Palm Island who had fought for a ‘proper education’. During this year, Mabo's adoptive father Benny became ill. As such, Mabo is sought permission via the Murray Island Council and the Queensland Department of Aboriginal Affairs to return to Mer to visit. However, this request is denied and several years later his father dies in the year 1975. Consequently, Mabo organised a family trip in 1977 to return to Mer.

This transitions into the second part of the film known as "The Battle of his Life" whereby the audience is introduced to barrister Bryan Keon-Cohen in charge of Mabo's case. Following this there is an introduction to Supreme Court Justice, Martin Moynihan representing the government of Queensland. The rest of the proceedings are captured as Mabo accompanies the legal team to the Island of Mer to discuss the customary and continued practices of land ownership. The system of land ownership is exhibited as elders step forth claiming different lots.

The final part of the film is title "The Journey Home" and details the celebratory aspects of his burial. Initially, Mabo was buried with a small wooden cross on 1992 in his hometown of Townsville, Queensland. This final part of the film documents the last transition, as Mabo's family has to deal the renewed mourning as a result of the vandalism. His family then decides to have a traditional re-burial on Murray Island to signify his return to his homeland. Here they have a tribal dance accompanied with traditional drums and music to display this commemoration of Mabo's life. The film shows montage of the tombstone unveiling and subsequent defacement. (see below). A scene shows a young boy asking "what does Abo mean" in reference to the graffiti upon the tombstone. The ending sequence depicts a gathering of people engaging in the Malo dance as Jack Wailu (friend) sings, this is cross cut with a slowed video of Mabo fishing on his rightful land. The last shot shows Mabo fishing in the waters of Mer, as if he has completed his journey home, a protector of his land and people.

== Production ==
Principal photography took place in Murray Island (Mer) and Townsville Queensland, placing focus on Mabo's close family relatives.

== Themes ==
=== Meaning of the face ===
A running motif within the documentary is putting a face to the name, such that Mabo wider social recognition could be married with his private life. The face is a metaphor which is represented through the photographic closeups to paint a portrait of Mabo's character. However, this portrayal is also construed as literal in the defacement of Mabo's tombstone.

=== Tombstone defacement ===
As shown in the film, Mabo's family conducted a tombstone opening ceremony, a tradition within Torres Strait Islander culture, where the tombstone is unveiled to signify the release of the spirit of the deceased. On 3 June 1995, several years after Mabo's death and the date of the 3rd anniversary of the High Court Judgement, Mabo's family decided to host a celebration.

A traditional tombstone opening within Melanesian culture is usually a time of celebration as it marks a time when the spirit of the deceased is free, thus the family is also free from mourning. The widow of the deceased is also allowed to remarry after this occasion.

In the film, they show iconic individuals such as Mrs Anita Keating (the Prime Minister's wife) and Robert Tickner (Aboriginal and Islander Affairs Minister) as representation for the Federal Government. Following this they cut the ribbon and proceeded with the unveiling of the tombstone, to signify not only Mabo's life achievements but the improvement of rights for Aboriginal and Torres Strait Islanders into the future.

== Origins of the film ==
This is joyous send-off is usually performed several years after the funeral. However, the following night several vandals defaced the tombstone with spray paint. This also led to the origins of the film as director Trevor Graham stated that "Bonita [Mabo] was pestering me to go and film the tombstone opening… so I got a crew together who went up to Townsville to film the tombstone opening and the celebrations. Then, of course, the day after the grave was trashed…the real reason for making the second film was a sense of outrage about his grave being trashed."

== Critical reception ==
After the release of this documentary, there was an impact on the Australian film landscape such that Trevor Graham's personalised and intimate style of cinematography altered how documentaries were made. Graham employs a variety of first-person narration, inter-splicing of archival footage and family interviews. At the time, the documentary on Mabo was needed to address the racial tension between Australians. The film not only reveals his troublesome upbringing, subsequent exile and difficulty living in Australia, but also reveals his natural aptitude for leadership.

== Legacy ==
The film has been screened by organisations such as the National Film and Sound Archive and SBS under programs to mark events such as the 50th Anniversary of the 1967 Aboriginal Indigenous Referendum, the 25th anniversary of the 1992 High Court Ruling decision, and the annual Reconciliation Week.

== Accolades ==
- 1997 AFI Award, Best Documentary
- 1997 Sydney Film Festival, Best Documentary
- 1997 Logie Award Nominee
- 1997 New South Wales Premier's Literary Awards, Betty Roland Prize for Script Writing
- 1998 NSW Premier's History Award, Digital History Prize
- 1997 Brisbane International Film Festival, Most Popular Film
- 2001 Winner, Amnesty International Film Festival (Vancouver, Canada)
