= Morgan Yasbincek =

Australian poet, novelist and academic

- Born: 1964 (age 61–62); Sydney, New South Wales, Australia
- Occupation: Poet
- Writing career
- Notable awards: 1997 Anne Elder Award winner; 1997 Mary Gilmore Award winner

Morgan Yasbincek (born 1964) is a contemporary Australian poet, novelist and academic.

Morgan Yasbincek lives in Western Australia where she completed her PhD at Murdoch University. She has held a residency at the University of East Anglia, United Kingdom in 1998 and currently teaches creative writing at Murdoch. Her writing, in both poetry and prose, deals with everyday concerns refracted through the lens of contemporary literary theory. Her first collection of poems, Night Reversing, won both the Anne Elder and the Mary Gilmore Awards for poetry.

== Works ==
Poetry

- Night Reversing (Fremantle Arts Centre Press, 1996) ISBN 1-86368-166-3
- Firelick (Fremantle Arts Centre, 2004) ISBN 1-920731-50-4
- White Camel (John Leonard Press, 2009) ISBN 978-0-9805269-4-3

Novel

- Liv: A novel. (Fremantle Arts Centre, 2000) ISBN 1-86368-284-8

== Awards ==
- 1997 Anne Elder Award, winner for Night Reversing
- 1997 Mary Gilmore Award, winner for Night Reversing
- 2000 ALS Gold Medal, shortlisted for Liv
- 2005 Victorian Premier's Literary Awards – Poetry, shortlisted for Firelick
- 2010 New South Wales Premier's Literary Awards – Kenneth Slessor Prize for Poetry, shortlisted for White Camel
