= Emma Lew =

Australian poet

- Born: 1952 (age 73–74); Richmond, Victoria, Australia
- Occupation: Poet
- Writing career
- Notable awards: 1998 Mary Gilmore Prize for a First Book of Poetry, winner; 1997 Dinny O'Hearn Poetry Prize, joint winner; 2003 Victorian Premier's Prize for Poetry, winner

Emma Lew (born 1962) is a contemporary Australian poet.

Born in Melbourne, Emma Lew studied arts at Melbourne University and worked as a deckhand, shop assistant, proof-reader, and clerical assistant, only beginning to write poetry in 1993.

Her work has appeared in numerous journals and anthologies in Australia and overseas. Her first volume of poems, The Wild Reply, won the 1998 Mary Gilmore Prize and was joint winner of The Age 1998 Poetry Book of the Year Prize. Her second book, Anything the Landlord Touches, published in 2002 and reissued in the UK by Shearsman Books in 2006, won the 2003 C. J. Dennis Prize for Poetry (Victorian Premier's Prize) and the 2003 Judith Wright Calanthe Award (Queensland Premier's Prize).

A collection of German language translations of selected poems, Nesselgesang, was published in 2008 (translations by Mirko Bonné).

== Works ==
=== Poetry ===
- The Wild Reply. (Black Pepper publishing, 1997) ISBN 1-876044-13-6 reviews
- Anything the Landlord Touches. (Giramondo, 2002; Shearsman 2006) ISBN 0-907562-92-2 review
- Nesselgesang. (yedermann Verlag, 2008) ISBN 978-3-935269-38-4
- Luminous Alias. (Vagabond Press, 2013)
- Crow College: New and selected poems. (Giramondo, 2019) ISBN 978-1-925818-05-5
