= Dragons in Their Pleasant Palaces =

1997 Australian poetry collection by Peter Porter

- Author: Peter Porter
- Language: English
- Genre: Poetry collection
- Publisher: Oxford University Press
- Publication date: 1997
- Publication place: Australia
- Media type: Print
- Pages: 56 pp
- Awards: 1997 The Age Book of the Year Award – Dinny O'Hearn Poetry Prize, joint-winner
- ISBN: 0192880284

Dragons in Their Pleasant Palaces is a collection of poems by Australian poet Peter Porter, published by Oxford University Press in 1997.

The collection contains 38 poems reprinted from a number of Australian and UK literary journals and newspapers, with several published here for the first time.

== Contents ==
- "Kings and Messengers"
- "A Great Reckoning in a Little Room"
- "Hardy, 1913"
- "About Auden's Juvenilia"
- "National Service"
- "Old Goldfields, Maryborough"
- "Breakfasting with Cockatoos"
- "Mobile Pool Cleaner"
- "Men Die, Women Go Mad"
- "Displacement"
- "The Western Canoe"
- "Two Cultures"
- "Dragons in Their Pleasant Palaces"
- "Fat and Salt"
- "Anxiety's Air Miles"
- "Too Many Miracles"
- "The Deaths of Poets"
- "John Ford Answers T.S. Eliot"
- "Bellini and Heine Come to Dinner"
- "Browning Meets Wagner at the Schlesingers'"
- "Collateral Damage"
- "Fafner's Needlework"
- "The Tenor is Too Close"
- "A Dance of Death"
- "Skinning a Skunk"
- "Verdi's Villa, Santa Agata"
- "The Lion of Antonello Da Messina"
- "What Borromini Saw"
- "Pines of Rome"
- "The Cocks of Campagnatico"
- "The Rose Garden on the Aventine"
- "Three Otrantos"
- "A Lament"
- "A Short Ballad of Unbelief"
- "A Reinterpretation"
- "Il Lacerato Spirito"
- "Mutant Proverbs"
- "Death and the Moggie"

== Critical reception ==
In a review of the collection for The Age newspaper, critic Peter Craven called Porter "the Australian poet of his generation who has the greatest tonal range and who succeeds in writing poems with great depth of feeling on one page only to engage the reader with some exercise of wit or ridiculousness on the next." He went on to note that there "is a world of storm and feeling behind even the most jokey of Porter's poems but there is also the technique".

Tim Kendall in The Guardian (UK) noted of the book that in "these difficult, some impenetrable poems, Porter dismisses the specific as having no poetic value except insofar as it provides a gateway to the universal."

== Awards ==
- 1997 The Age Book of the Year Award – Dinny O'Hearn Poetry Prize, joint-winner
- 1997 Kenneth Slessor Prize for Poetry, shortlisted
- 1997 Victorian Premier's Prize for Poetry, shortlisted
- 1998 Festival Awards for Literature (SA) Adelaide Festival Awards for Literature South Australian Literary Awards — John Bray Award for Poetry, shortlisted

== See also ==
- 1997 in Australian literature
