= Night Reversing =

1996 poetry collection by Morgan Yasbincek

- Author: Morgan Yasbincek
- Language: English
- Genre: Poetry collection
- Publisher: Fremantle Press
- Publication date: 1996
- Publication place: Australia
- Media type: Print
- Pages: 66 pp
- ISBN: 1863681663

Night Reversing is a 1996 collection of poetry by the Australian writer Morgan Yasbincek, published by Fremantle Press.

The collection consists of 41 poems, with the bulk of them being published for the first time here.

== Contents ==
- "A Hundred Years of Sleeping"
- "Sleeping"
- "See Me"
- "Tomb"
- "White Owl"
- "Selvedge : I : Hiding Something"
- "Selvedge : II : Orientation"
- "Selvedge : III : Ghost of a Train Station"
- "Selvedge : IV : It Moves Glass on Glass"
- "Body Language"
- "Morning"
- "Death of the Angel"
- "If I Could Pour Wine for You"
- "Hole in the Wall"
- "Laundromat"
- "Jack"
- "Veil"
- "Father/Daughter"
- "She is Teaching"
- "Other Women/Other Messages"
- "?"
- "After Language"
- "Sole Custody"
- "Mercury"
- "The Last of It"
- "Face"
- "Night Fever"
- "Amphibia"
- "Cows and Bulls"
- "Stepfathers"
- "Shame"
- "Crocodiles"
- "losing Open"
- "A Survival Thing"
- "Onymous"
- "Psych Rats"
- "Izzie's Dog"
- "Stories"
- "Rottnest Resort"
- "January"
- "Canada Poems"

== Critical reception ==
Reviewing the collection for Australian Book Review Lauren Williams noted the "shadowy partialness of many of Yasbincek’s poems." She went on to indicate that "there are two styles at work; one which hints and leaves things unresolved, the other which (more satisfyingly) has focus and resolution", which was enough "to indicate a poet of skill and heart."

== Awards ==
- 1997 Anne Elder Award, winner
- 1997 Mary Gilmore Award, winner

== Notes ==
- Epigraph: 'For the necessity of reading and being read is a dream from which we cannot awaken.' - Barbara Johnson

== See also ==
- 1996 in Australian literature
