= The Fiftieth Gate =

Book by Mark Raphael Baker

The Fiftieth Gate cap
- Author: Mark Raphael Baker
- Cover artist: Brett Odgers
- Language: English
- Publisher: HarperCollins
- Publication date: 1997
- Publication place: Australia
- Media type: Print (Paperback)
- Pages: 339
- ISBN: 978-0-7322-5804-7
- OCLC: 37702477
- Dewey Decimal: 940.53/18/0922 21
- LC Class: DS135.P63 A124 1997

The Fiftieth Gate is a book written by Mark Raphael Baker and published by HarperCollins in 1997. The book documents his exploration of his parents' memories and past in relation to the Holocaust. The book won a New South Wales Premier's Literary Award in 1997, and the Ethnic Affairs Commission Community Relations Commission Award in 2001.

== Themes ==
Baker explores many themes including the interplay between history and memory, the impacts of guilt on the children of Holocaust survivors, the value of individual memory and much more. Cultural themes are also an important element in The Fiftieth Gate, with sustained references to Jewish ritualism and the life following diaspora in Australia.
