= Greylands =

Novel by Isobelle Carmody

- Greylands first edition cover.
- Author: Isobelle Carmody
- Language: English
- Genre: Fantasy
- Publisher: Puffin Books
- Publication date: 1 September 1997
- Publication place: Australia
- Media type: Print (Paperback)
- Pages: 175 pp (first edition)
- ISBN: 0-14-038749-8

Greylands is a 1997 young adult novel by Isobelle Carmody. It follows the story of Jack who in order to come to terms with his mother's death writes a story in which he enters another world where he confronts his fears and finds answers to his questions. In 2012, Greylands was self-published into an ebook and republished by Ford Street Publishing.

== Background ==
Greylands was first published in Australia on 1 September 1997 by Puffin Books in trade paperback format. In 1998 it was published as an audiobook by Louis Braille Books. Greylands was a joint winner, along with Catherine Jinks' Eye to Eye, of the 1997 Aurealis Award for best young-adult novel.

== Synopsis ==
Jack and his sister Ellen are suffering in the aftermath of their mother's death, which has caused their father to withdraw into himself. There is some unsolved mystery which Jack tries to explore. To him, the mystery has something to do with the "greylands", a world on the other side of his mirror. Much of the action takes place in these greylands, where Jack meets a strange girl and discovers that his soul is at risk. The adventure is described from Jack's point of view, and within the context of the novel may be a true account of his experiences or a story he is inventing.

== Movie ==
Isobelle Carmody herself is writing the screenplay to a movie adaptation, which will be produced by Tara Morice.
