= Association for the Study of Australian Literature =

Australian organization

Association for the Study of Australian Literature Ltd
- Founded: 1977
- Type: Literary and educational; Australian public company, limited by guarantee (from date 17 May 1984)
- VAT ID no.: ABN 37 002 755 599
- Registration no.: ACN 002 755 599
- Location: Burwood, Victoria
- Region served: Australia
- Website: www.asal.org.au

Journal of the Association for the Study of Australian Literature
- Discipline: Australian literature
- Language: English
- Edited by: Joe Cummins, Helen Groth, Susan Lever, Brigitta Olubas, Tony Simoes da Silva, Jay Daniel Thompson

Publication details
- Former names: Notes and Furphies
- History: 1978–present
- Publisher: Association for the Study of Australian Literature (Australia)
- Frequency: Biannually
- Open access: Yes
- License: CC BY-NC-SA 2.1 Australia

Standard abbreviations
- ISO 4: J. Assoc. Study Aust. Lit.

Indexing
- Journal of the Association for the Study of Australian Literature
- ISSN: 1447-8986
- OCLC no.: 71365111
- Notes and Furphies
- ISSN: 0156-806X

Links
- Journal homepage; Online access; Online archive; Journal page at association's website

The Association for the Study of Australian Literature (ASAL) is an Australian organisation which promotes the creation and study of Australian literature and literary culture especially through the interaction of Australian writers with teachers and students. It administers several awards, holds a yearly conference, publishes a newsletter and journal, and has sponsored several publications.

== Awards ==
The Australian Literature Society, which had been formed in Melbourne in 1899, merged into ASAL which, since 1982, has administered the ALS Gold Medal. In addition, ASAL administers the following awards:

- Mary Gilmore Award
- A.D. Hope Prize, awarded annually for the best paper delivered by a postgraduate student to the ASAL annual conference
- Walter McRae Russell Award, for the best book of literary scholarship on an Australian subject published in the preceding two calendar years; before 1994, it was awarded to a young or unestablished author for an outstanding work of literary scholarship
- the Magarey Medal for biography, a biennial prize for the best published biographical writing by a female author on an Australian subject in the preceding two years
- the A.A. Phillips Award, an occasional award for a work or the work of an author which the ASAL executive considers an outstanding contribution to Australian literature or literary studies

== History ==
In May 1978, writer and academic Mary Lord organized the inaugural ASAL conference at Monash University. At this conference, the Association adopted its constitution and appointed A.D. Hope and Judith Wright as patrons.

== Life members ==
ASAL has conferred life membership upon Clem Christesen, Mary Lord, Judith Wright, Thea Astley, Peter Cowan, Rosemary Dobson, Gwen Harwood, Eric Irvin, Ken Stewart, Julian Croft, and Ian McLaren.

== Publications ==
From October 1978 until October 2000, ASAL published 43 issues of a bulletin, Notes and Furphies. The bulletin was merged with ASAL's publication of conference proceedings to form the Journal of the Association for the Study of Australian Literature.

ASAL initiated the ASAL Literary Studies Series of specialist monographs on Australian writing. The following volumes have appeared:

- Paul Genoni, Subverting the Empire: Explorers and Exploration in Australian Fiction (2004) ISBN 1863355537
- Anne Pender, Christina Stead: Satirist (2002) ISBN 1863350837
- Susan Lever, Real Relations: The Feminist Politics of Form in Australian Fiction (2000) ISBN 1875684417
- Alison Bartlett, Jamming the Machinery: Contemporary Australian Women’s Writing (1998) ISBN 0958712123
- Leigh Dale, The English Men: Professing Literature in Australian Universities (1997) ISBN 0646311611
- David Carter, A Career in Writing: Judah Waten and the Cultural Cringe (1997) ISBN 0958712107

Other publications ASAL has sponsored are:

- The Oxford Literary Guide to Australia (1987, revised 1993)
- the Penguin New Literary History of Australia (1988) and
- the Macquarie Dictionary of Australian Quotations (1990).
