= Eye to Eye (Jinks novel) =

1997 novel by Catherine Jinks

- Eye to Eye hardback edition cover.
- Author: Catherine Jinks
- Language: English
- Genre: Young adult, science fiction
- Publisher: Puffin Books
- Publication date: September 1997
- Publication place: Australia
- Media type: Print (Hardback & Paperback)
- Pages: 150 (first edition)
- ISBN: 0-14-038444-8

Eye to Eye is a 1997 young adult science fiction novel by Catherine Jinks. It follows the story of Jansi who while scavenging in the desert comes across a damaged star ship which contains a computer that has the ability to project thought, expression and friendship.

== Background ==
Eye to Eye was first published in Australia in 1997 by Puffin Books in trade paperback format and by Bolinda Publishing as an audiobook. It was also released in the United Kingdom in 1997 in hardback format. Eye to Eye was a joint winner, along with Isobelle Carmody's Greylands, of the 1997 Aurealis Award for best young-adult novel.

== Awards ==
- Won - CBCA Children's Book of the Year Award: Older Readers (1998)
