= Catherine Jinks =

Australian writer

- Born: 1963 (age 62–63); Brisbane, Queensland, Australia
- Writing career
- Language: English
- Years active: 1986-present

Catherine Jinks (born 1963) is an Australian writer of fiction books for all age groups. She has won many awards including the Children's Book Council of Australia Book of the Year Award four times, the Victorian Premier's Literary Award, the Aurealis Award for science fiction, the IBBY Australia Ena Noel Encouragement Award, the Adelaide Festival Award, and the Davitt Award for crime fiction.

== Early life ==
Jinks was born in Brisbane, Queensland, and grew up in Papua New Guinea where her father worked as a patrol officer. She went to Ku-ring-gai High School in Sydney, where the library was named after her in 2007.

== Books ==
- This Way Out (1991)
- The Future Trap (1993)
- Witch Bank (1995)
- The Secret of Hermitage Isle (1996)
- An Evening with the Messiah (1996)
- Little White Secrets (1997)
- Eye to Eye (1998)
- The Horrible Holiday (1998)
- Piggy in the Middle (1998)
- The Stinking Great Lie (1999)
- The Inquisitor (2000)
- The Notary (2000)
- You'll Wake the Baby (2000)
- What's Hector McKerrow Doing These Days (2000)
- Bella Vista (2001)
- The Rapture (2001)
- The Gentleman's Garden (2002)
- Daryl's Dinner (2002)
- The Road (2004)
- Spinning Around (2004)
- The Secret Familiar (2006)
- Katie & Cleo Move In (2007)
- Living Hell (2007)
- Dark Mountain (2008)
- The Paradise Trap (2011)
- Saving Thanehaven (2013)
- Theophilus Grey and the Demon Thief (2015)
- Shepherd (2019)
- Shelter (2021)
- The Attack (2021)

=== Fiction series ===
Pagan's Chronicles

- Pagan's Crusade (1992)
- Pagan in Exile (1994)
- Pagan's Vows (1995)
- Pagan's Scribe (1995)
- Pagan's Daughter (2006)

Allie's Ghost Hunters

- Eglantine (2002)
- Eustace (2003)
- Eloise (2004)
- Elysium (2007)

Genius

- Evil Genius (2005)
- Genius Squad (2008)
- The Genius Wars (2009)

Support Group

- The Reformed Vampire Support Group (2009)
- The Abused Werewolf Rescue Group (2010)

City of Orphans

- A Very Unusual Pursuit (2013)
- A Very Peculiar Plague (2013)
- A Very Singular Guild

== Awards ==
- 1996 winner Children's Book of the Year Award: Older Readers – Pagan's Vows
- 1997 co-winner Aurealis Award for best young-adult novel – Eye to Eye
- 1998 winner Children's Book of the Year Award: Older Readers – Eye to Eye
- 2001 winner Children's Book of the Year Award: Younger Readers – You'll Wake the Baby
- 2006 winner Davitt Award — Best Young Adult Book – Evil Genius
- 2009 winner Davitt Award — Best Young Adult Book – Genius Squad
- 2014 winner Children's Book of the Year Award: Younger Readers – A Very Unusual Pursuit
- 2019 winner Best Novel, Australian Shadow Awards – Shepherd
- 2020 shortlisted Colin Roderick Award — Shepherd
