= Western Australian Premier's Book Awards =

Australian literary award

Western Australian Premier’s Book Awards
- Location: Perth, Western Australia
- Country: Australia
- First award: 1982; 44 years ago
- Website: WA Premier's Book Award

The Western Australian Premier's Book Awards is an annual book award provided by the Government of Western Australia, and managed by the State Library of Western Australia.

== History and format ==
Annual literary awards were inaugurated by the Western Australian Government in 1982 to honour and celebrate the literary achievements of Western Australian writers. Until 1990 the Western Australian Premier's Book Awards were called the WA Week Literary Awards. The title of the award refers to the year of publication, rather than the year in which the awards were announced e.g.the 2011 awards for works published that year were announced in 2012. This changed to the award year in 2023.

The categories included poetry, non-fiction, fiction, Western Australian history, children's book, YA fiction, scripts and digital narrative. There was also a Premier's Prize, which was awarded to an overall winner.

The Barnett government downgraded the awards from an annual event to a biennial one much to the disappointment of the WA arts sector.

The McGowan government reinstated the annual award format in 2018. There were four categories – the Western Australian Writer's Fellowship (valued at $60,000), the Premier's Prize for Writing for Children ($15,000), the Premier's Prize for an Emerging Writer ($15,000) and the Daisy Utemorrah Award for Indigenous Authors ($15,000 and publishing contract with Magabala Books). A fifth award was added in 2023, the Premier's Prize for Book of the Year ($15,000).

There have been calls for the awards to be restored to their previous levels as there are currently no categories for established poets and non-fiction writers.

In 2025 four new categories were introduced for fiction, nonfiction, poetry and young adult. Also new is the Book of the Year to be chosen from the category winners.

== Honorees ==
=== 1990s ===
Year	Category	Author	Title	Publisher
1993	Children's Books	Gracie Green	Tjarany Roughtail: The Dreaming of the Roughtail Lizard and Other Stories told by the Kukatja Gracie Green	Magabala Books
1993	Fiction	Gail Jones	The House of Breathing	Fremantle Arts Centre Press
1993	Historical & Critical Studies	Elizabeth Jolley	Central Mischief: Elizabeth Jolley on Writing, Her Past and Herself	Viking
1993	Poetry	John Kinsella	Full Fathom Five	Fremantle Arts Centre Press
1993	Special Award	Heather Nimmo	One small step and Witchplay	Currency Press
1994	Children's Books	Mike Lefroy and Peter Kendall	Rosa's Famous Elbow	Fremantle Arts Centre Press
1994	Fiction	Joan London	Letter to Constantine	Fremantle Arts Centre Press
1994	Historical & Critical Studies	David Horton	The Encyclopaedia of Aboriginal Australia	Aboriginal Studies Press
1994	Poetry	Dorothy Hewett	Peninsula	Fremantle Arts Centre Press
1994	Premier's Prize	Dorothy Hewett	Peninsula	Fremantle Arts Centre Press
1994	Script	Lois Achimovich	Meekatharra	Black Swan Theatre Company
1994	Special Award	Peter Holland	Summer Shorts	Fremantle Arts Centre Press
1995	Children's & Young Adult's Books	Glyn Parry	Radical Take-offs	Allen & Unwin
1995	Fiction	Simone Lazaroo	The World Waiting to be Made	Fremantle Arts Centre Press
1995	Historical & Critical Studies	George Seddon	Searching for the Snowy	Allen & Unwin
1995	Poetry	Andrew Taylor	Sandstone	University of Queensland Press
1995	Premier's Prize	Glyn Parry	Radical Take-offs	Allen & Unwin
1995	Script	Heather Nimmo	Whispering Demons	Perth Theatre Company
1995	Special Award	Elizabeth Rippey and Barbara Rowland	Plants of the Perth Coast and Islands	University of Western Australia Press
1996	Overall	Banjo Woorunmurra and Howard Pedersen	Resistance: Jandamarra and the Bunuba	Magabala Books
1996	Children & Young Adult's Books	Helen Bell	Idjhil	University of Western Australia Press
1996	Fiction	Heather Grace	The Lighthouse Spark	Fremantle Arts Centre Press
1996	Fiction	Dave Warner	City of Light	Fremantle Arts Centre Press
1996	Historical & Critical Studies	Banjo Woorunmurra and Howard Pedersen	Resistance: Jandamarra and the Bunuba	Magabala Books
1996	Poetry	Dorothy Hewett	Collected Poems	Fremantle Arts Centre Press
1996	Script Award	Sarah Rossetti	Culture Clash	Rosenbaum Whitbread
1996	Special Award	Mike Leonard	The Kimberley: A journey through Northwest Australia	CIS Cardigan Street Publishers
1997	Overall	Gail Jones	Fetish Lives	Fremantle Arts Centre Press
1997	Overall	Robert Drewe	The Drowner	Pan Macmillan Australia
1997	Children & Young Adult's Books	Deborah Lisson	A Place of Safety	Mammoth (Reed Books)
1997	Fiction	Gail Jones	Fetish Lives	Fremantle Arts Centre Press
1997	Fiction	Robert Drewe	The Drowner	Pan Macmillan Australia
1997	Historical & Critical Studies	Phillip Playford	Carpet of Silver: The Wreck of the Zuytdorp	University of Western Australia Press
1997	Poetry	Alec Choate	The Wheels of Hama: Collected War Poems	Victor Publishing
1997	Script Award	Dickon Oxenburgh and Andrew Ross	Merry-Go-Round-In -the Sea	Black Swan Theatre
1997	Special Award		Songs of Strength: Sixteen Women Talk About Cancer	Women's Cancer Group (Macmillan)
1998	Overall	Carolyn Polizzotto	Pomegranate Season	Fremantle Arts Centre Press
1998	Children's book	Pat Lowe and Jimmy Pike	Desert Dog	Magabala Books
1998	Fiction	Pat Jacobs	Going Inland	Fremantle Arts Centre
1998	Historical & Critical Studies	Quentin Beresford and Paul Omaji	Our State of Mind: Racial Planning and the Stolen Generations	Fremantle Arts Centre Press
1998	Poetry	Fay Zwicky	The Gatekeeper's Wife	Brandl & Schlesinger
1998	Poetry	John Kinsella	The Hunt and Other Poems	Fremantle Arts Centre Press
1998	Script Award	Ingle Knight	Milk and Honey	Perth Theatre Company
1998	Writing for Young Adults	Deborah Lisson	Red Hugh	Lothian
1999	Children's book	Reg Bolton	Showtime: Over 75 Ways to Put on a Show	Dorling Kindersley
1999	Fiction	Kim Scott	Benang: From the Heart	Fremantle Arts Centre Press
1999	Fiction	Kim Scott	Benang: From the Heart	Fremantle Arts Centre Press
1999	Historical & Critical Studies	Estelle Blackburn	Broken Lives	Stellar Publishing
1999	Poetry	Tracy Ryan	The Willing Eye	Fremantle Arts Centre Press
1999	Special Award	Victor France, Larry Mitchell, and Alison Wright	Abrolhos Islands Conversations	Fremantle Arts Centre Press
1999	Writing for Young Adults	Glyn Parry	Scooterboy	Hodder Headline

=== 2000s ===
Year	Category	Author	Title	Publisher
2000	Overall	Michèle Drouart	Into the Wadi	Fremantle Arts Centre
2000	Children's book	Kirsty Murray	Zarconi's Magic Flying Fish	Allen & Unwin
2000	Fiction	Simone Lazaroo	The Australian Fiancé	Pan Macmillan
2000	Non-fiction	Robert Drewe	The Shark Net: Memories and Murder	Viking
2000	Non-fiction	Michèle Drouart	Into the Wadi	Fremantle Arts Centre
2000	Poetry	Mark Reid	Parochial	Fremantle Arts Centre
2000	Writing for Young Adults	Anthony Eaton	The Darkness	University of Queensland Press
2001	Overall	Tim Winton	Dirt Music	Picador
2001	Children's book	Deborah Lisson	The Yankee Whaler	Scholastic
2001	Fiction	Tim Winton	Dirt Music	Picador
2001	Non-fiction	Jan Gothard	Blue China: Single Female Migration to Colonial Australia	Melbourne University Publishing
2001	Non-fiction	John Bailey	The White Divers of Broome	Macmillan
2001	Poetry	Dorothy Hewett	Halfway up the Mountain	Fremantle Arts Centre
2001	Script	Sally Riley and Archie Weller	Confessions of a Headhunter	
2001	Writing for Young Adults	Julia Lawrinson	Obsession	Fremantle Arts Centre
2002	Overall	Richard Bosworth	Mussolini	Edward Arnold
2002	Children's book	Mark Greenwood and Frané Lessac	The Legend of Moondyne Joe	Cygnet/University of Western Australia
2002	Fiction	Gail Jones	Black Mirror	Picador
2002	Non-fiction	Richard Bosworth	Mussolini	Edward Arnold
2002	Non-fiction	Walmajarri storytellers, ed. Joyce Hudson, Pat Lowe, and Eirlys Richards	Out of the Desert: Stories from the Walmajarri Exodus	Magabala Books
2002	Poetry	Barbara Temperton	Going Feral	Fremantle Arts Centre
2002	Script	Hellie Turner	Bench	
2002	Writing for Young Adults	Pat Lowe	Feeling the Heat	Penguin
2003	Overall	Reg Cribb	Last Cab to Darwin	Pork Chop Productions/Black Swan Theatre Company
2003	Children's book	Mark Greenwood	The Legend of Lasseter's Reef	Cygnet/University of Western Australia
2003	Fiction	Brett D'Arcy	The Mindless Ferocity of Sharks	Vintage
2003	Non-fiction	John Dowson	Old Fremantle	University of Western Australia Press
2003	Non-fiction	Stephen Kinnane	Shadow Lines	Fremantle Arts Centre
2003	Poetry	John Kinsella	Peripheral Light	Fremantle Arts Centre
2003	Script	Reg Cribb	Last Cab to Darwin	Pork Chop Productions/Black Swan Theatre Company
2003	Writing for Young Adults	Colin Bowles	Nights in the Sun	Penguin
2004	Overall	Gail Jones	Sixty Lights	
2004	Children's book	Joanne Crawford and Grace Fielding	A Home for Bilby	Magabala Books
2004	Fiction	Gail Jones	Sixty Lights	Random House Australia
2004	Non-fiction	Greg Craven	Conversations with the Constitution	University of New South Wales
2004	Non-fiction	Kate Lance	Redbill: From Pearls to Peace: The Life and Times of a Remarkable Lugger	Fremantle Arts Centre
2004	Poetry	Miriam Wei Wei Lo	Against Certain Capture	Five Islands Press
2004	Script	Jolly Read	Yandy	Black Swan Theatre Company
2004	Western Australian History	Anthony Barker	Behind the Play	West Australian Football Commission
2004	Writing for Young Adults	Anthony Eaton	Fireshadow	University of Queensland
2005	Overall	Sue Davenport, Peter Johnson, and Yuwali	Cleared Out: First Contact in the Western Desert	
2005	Children's book	Wendy Binks	Where's Stripey?	Stunned Emu Press
2005	Fiction	Carrie Tiffany	Everyman's Rules for Scientific Living	Picador
2005	Non-fiction	Philippa Nikulinsky and Stephen D Hopper	Soul of the Desert	Fremantle Arts Centre
2005	Non-fiction	Richard Bosworth	Mussolini's Italy: Life Under the Dictatorship 1915-1945	Allen Lane/Penguin
2005	Poetry	Rod Moran	The Paradoxes of Water: Selected and New Poems, 1970-2005	Salt Publishing
2005	Script	Reg Cribb	Last Train to Freo	Sue Taylor Media
2005	Western Australian History	Sue Davenport, Peter Johnson, and Yuwali	Cleared Out: First Contact in the Western Desert	Aboriginal Studies Press
2005	Writing for Young Adults	Kirsty Murray	A Prayer for Blue Delaney	Allen & Unwin
2006	Overall	Shaun Tan	The Arrival	
2006	Children's book	Shaun Tan	The Arrival	Hachette Livre Australia
2006	Fiction	Simone Lazaroo	The Travel Writer	Pan Macmillan Australia
2006	Non-fiction	Quentin Beresford	Rob Riley: An Aboriginal Leader's Quest for Justice	Aboriginal Studies Press
2006	Nonfiction	Peter Edwards	Arthur Tange: Last of the Mandarins	Allen & Unwin
2006	Poetry	Dennis Haskell	All the Time in the World	Salt Publishing
2006	Script	Hellie Turner	Sardines	Tropic Sun Theatre Queensland
2006	Western Australian History	Bobbie Oliver	The Workshops: A History of the Midland Government Railway Workshops	University of Western Australia Press
2006	Writing for Young Adults	Kate McCaffrey	Destroying Avalon	Fremantle Arts Centre Press
2007	Overall	Liz Lofthouse and Robert Ingpen	Ziba Came on a Boat	
2007	Children's book	Liz Lofthouse and Robert Ingpen	Ziba Came on a Boat	Viking Press
2007	Fiction	Stephen Scourfield	Other Country	Allen & Unwin
2007	History Section	Lucy Taksa	Bobbie Oliver and Patrick Bertola: The History of the Westrail Midland Railway Workshops	University of Western Australia Press
2007	Non-fiction	Antonio Buti	Sir Ronald Wilson: A Matter of Conscience	University of Western Australia Press
2007	Poetry	Hal Colebatch	The Light River	Connor Court Publishing
2007	Script	Elissa Down and Jimmy the Exploder	The Black Balloon	Black Balloon Film Productions
2007	Western Australian History	Ruth Marchant James	Cottesloe: A Town of Distinction	Town of Cottesloe
2007	Writing for Young Adults	Ken Spillman	Love Is a UFO	Pan Macmillan Australia
2008	Overall	Chloe Hooper	The Tall Man	
2008	Children's book	Bob Graham	How to Heal a Broken Wing	
2008	Fiction	Richard Flanagan	Wanting	
2008	Non-fiction	Chloe Hooper	The Tall Man	
2008	Poetry	Bronwyn Lea	The Other Way Out	
2008	Script	Damien Millar	The Modern International Dead	
2008	Western Australian History	Brian Dibble	Doing Life: A biography of Elizabeth Jolley	
2008	Writing for Young Adults	Shaun Tan	Tales from Outer Suburbia	
2009	Overall	Shirley Barrett	South Solitary	
2009	Children's book	Margaret Wild and Freya Blackwood	Harry & Hopper	
2009	Fiction	Craig Silvey	Jasper Jones	
2009	Fiction	J. M. Coetzee	Summertime	
2009	Non-fiction	Iain McCalman	Darwin's Armada	
2009	Poetry	Kate Middleton	Fire Season	
2009	Script	Shirley Barrett	South Solitary	
2009	Western Australian History	Penelope Hetherington	Paupers: Poor Relief & Poor Houses	
2009	Writing for Young Adults	Justine Larbalestier	Liar	

=== 2010s ===
Year	Category	Author	Title	Result
2010	Overall	Kim Scott	That Deadman Dance	Winner
2010	Children's book	Sally Murphy and Rhian Nest James	Toppling	Winner
2010	Digital Narrative	Robin Craig Clark	The Garden	Winner
2010	Fiction	Kim Scott	That Deadman Dance	Winner
2010	Non-fiction	Jim Davidson	The Historian: W K Hancock	Winner
2010	People's Choice	Lisa Lang	Utopian Man	Winner
2010	Poetry	Mark Tredinnick	Fire Diary	Winner
2010	Script	Tommy Murphy	Gwen in Purgatory	Winner
2010	Western Australian History	Susanna Iuliano	Vite Italiane, Italian Lives in Western Australia	Winner
2010	Writing for Young Adults	Scot Gardner	Happy as Larry	Winner
2010	Writing for Young Adults	James Roy	Anonymity Jones	Winner
2011	Overall	Fiona Skyring	Justice: A History of the Aboriginal Legal Service of Western Australia	Winner
2011	Children's book	Michele Gillespie and Sonia Martinez	Sam, Grace and the Shipwreck	Winner
2011	Digital Narrative	Max Barry	Machine Man	Winner
2011	Fiction	Anna Funder	All That I Am	Winner
2011	Non-fiction	Alice Pung	Her Father's Daughter	Winner
2011	People's Choice	Anna Funder	All That I Am	Winner
2011	Poetry	Tracy Ryan	The Argument	Winner
2011	Script	Tim Winton and Ellen Fontana	Cloudstreet: The Screenplay	Winner
2011	Western Australian History	Fiona Skyring	Justice: A History of the Aboriginal Legal Service of Western Australia	Winner
2011	Writing for Young Adults	Penni Russon	Only Ever Always	Winner
2012	Overall	Michelle de Kretser	Questions of Travel	Winner
2012	Children's book	Peter Macinnis	Australian Backyard Naturalist	Winner
2012	Children's book	Steven Herrick	Pookie Aleera Is Not My Boyfriend	Winner
2012	Digital Narrative	David Reiter	My Planets Reunion Memoir	Winner
2012	Fiction	Michelle de Kretser	Questions of Travel	Winner
2012	Non-fiction	Roger Averill	Exile: The Lives and Hopes of Werner Pelz	Winner
2012	People's Choice	Deborah Forster	The Meaning of Grace	Winner
2012	Poetry	Robert Gray	Cumulus	Winner
2012	Script	Ingle Knight	The Fremantle Candidate	Winner
2012	Western Australian History	Aboriginal Studies Press	Kurlumarniny: We come from the Desert	Winner
2012	Writing for Young Adults	Margo Lanagan	Sea Hearts	Winner
2014	Overall	Richard Flanagan	The Narrow Road to the Deep North	Winner
2014	Children's book	Jan Ormerod and Andrew Joyner	The Swap	Winner
2014	Children's book	Dianne Wolfer and Brian Simmonds	Light Horse Boy	Winner
2014	Digital Narrative	Christy Dena	AUTHENTIC IN ALL CAPS	Winner
2014	Emerging Writer's Award	Yvette Walker	Letters to the End of Love	Winner
2014	Fiction	Richard Flanagan	The Narrow Road to the Deep North	Winner
2014	Non-fiction	Kristina Olsson	Boy, Lost: A Family Memoir	Winner
2014	People's Choice	Tim Winton	Eyrie	Winner
2014	Poetry	Paul Hetherington	Six Different Windows	Winner
2014	Script	Van Badham	The Bull, the Moon and the Coronet of Stars	Winner
2014	Western Australian History	Margaret Simons	Kerry Stokes: Self-Made Man	Winner
2014	Writing for Young Adults	Alyssa Brugman	Alex as Well	Winner
2016	Overall	Helen Garner	This House of Grief	Winner
2016	Children's Books	Glenda Millard, illustrated by Stephen Michael King	The Duck and the Darklings	Winner
2016	Digital Narrative	David P. Reiter	Timelord Dreaming	Winner
2016	Fiction	Joan London	The Golden Age	Winner
2016	Non-fiction	Helen Garner	This House of Grief	Winner
2016	People's Choice Award	Miles Allinson	Fever of Animals	Winner
2016	Poetry	Lucy Dougan	The Guardians	Winner
2016	Script	Suzie Miller	Dust	Winner
2016	Western Australian Emerging Writers Award	Brooke Davis	Lost and Found	Winner
2016	Western Australian History	Ruth A. Morgan	Running Out? Water in WA	Winner
2016	Young Adult	Claire Zorn	The Protected	Winner
2018	Daisy Utemorrah Award for Indigenous Authors	Kirli Saunders	Mother Speaks	Winner
2018	Premier's Prize for an Emerging Writer	Reneé Pettitt-Schipp	The Sky Runs Right Through Us	Winner
2018	Premier's Prize for Writing for Children	Kelly Canby	The Hole Story	Winner
2018	Western Australian Writer's Fellowship	A. J. Betts		Winner
2019	Western Australian Writers Hall of Fame	Kim Scott		Winner
2019	Western Australian Writer's Fellowship	Amanda Curtin		Winner
2019	Western Australian Writer's Fellowship	Lucy Dougan		Shortlist
2019	Western Australian Writer's Fellowship	Rafeif Ismail		Shortlist
2019	Western Australian Writer's Fellowship	Caitlin Maling		Shortlist
2019	Western Australian Writer's Fellowship	Carl Merrison		Shortlist
2019	Premier's Prize for an Emerging Writer	Holden Sheppard	Invisible Boys	Winner
2019	Premier's Prize for an Emerging Writer	Bindy Pritchard	Fabulous Lives	Shortlist
2019	Premier's Prize for an Emerging Writer	Virginia Jealous	Rapture's Roadway	Shortlist
2019	Premier's Prize for an Emerging Writer	David Pollock	The Wooleen Way	Shortlist
2019	Premier's Prize for an Emerging Writer	Helen Milroy	Wombat, Mudlark and Other Stories	Shortlist
2019	Daisy Utemorrah Award for Indigenous Authors	Teela May Reid	Our Matriarchs Matter	Winner
2019	Daisy Utemorrah Award for Indigenous Authors	Ellen van Neerven	18 Comments	Shortlist
2019	Daisy Utemorrah Award for Indigenous Authors	Elizabeth Stuart	Swell	Shortlist
2019	Daisy Utemorrah Award for Indigenous Authors	Jannali Jones	Yenda	Shortlist
2019	Daisy Utemorrah Award for Indigenous Authors	Krista Dunstan	Noble Intentions	Shortlist
2019	Premier's Prize for Writing for Children	Meg McKinlay	Catch a Falling Star	Winner
2019	Premier's Prize for Writing for Children	Kathryn Lefroy	Alex and the Alpacas Save the World	Shortlist
2019	Premier's Prize for Writing for Children	Meg McKinlay, illustrated by Leila Rudge	Let me Sleep, Sheep!	Shortlist
2019	Premier's Prize for Writing for Children	Michael Speechley	The Gift	Shortlist
2019	Premier's Prize for Writing for Children	Fiona Burrows	Violet and Nothing	Shortlist

=== 2020s ===
Year	Category	Writer	Title	Publisher	Result
2020	Western Australian Writer's Fellowship	Sisonke Msimang			Winner
2020	Western Australian Writer's Fellowship	Amanda Bridgeman			Shortlist
2020	Western Australian Writer's Fellowship	Donna Mazza			Shortlist
2020	Western Australian Writer's Fellowship	Jon Doust			Shortlist
2020	Western Australian Writer's Fellowship	Madelaine Dickie			Shortlist
2020	Premier's Prize for an Emerging Writer	Rebecca Giggs	Fathoms: The World in the Whale	Scribe	Winner
2020	Premier's Prize for an Emerging Writer	Yuot A. Alaak	Father of the Lost Boys	Fremantle Press	Shortlist
2020	Premier's Prize for an Emerging Writer	Pattie Lees and Adam C. Lees	A Question of Colour	Magabala Books	Shortlist
2020	Premier's Prize for an Emerging Writer	Sophie McNeill	We Can't Say We Didn't Know	ABC Books	Shortlist
2020	Premier's Prize for an Emerging Writer	Catherine Noske	The Salt Madonna	Pan Macmillan Australia	Shortlist
2020	Daisy Utemorrah Award for Indigenous Authors	Carl Merrison and Hakea Hustler	Dirran		Winner
2020	Daisy Utemorrah Award for Indigenous Authors	Natasha Leslie	Home Is Calling		Shortlist
2020	Premier's Prize for Writing for Children	Meg McKinlay, illustrated by Matt Ottley	How to Make a Bird		Winner
2020	Premier's Prize for Writing for Children	Kelly Canby	Littlelight	Fremantle Press	Shortlist
2020	Premier's Prize for Writing for Children	Shirley Purdie	Shirley Purdie: My Story, Ngaginybe Jarragbe	Magabala Books	Shortlist
2020	Premier's Prize for Writing for Children	Bren MacDibble	Across The Risen Sea	Allen & Unwin	Shortlist
2020	Premier's Prize for Writing for Children	Helen Milroy	Willy-willy Wagtail: Tales from the Bush Mob	Magabala Books	Shortlist
2021	Western Australian Writers Hall of Fame	Doris Pilkington Garimara			Winner
2021	Western Australian Writer's Fellowship	Nandi Chinna			Winner
2021	Western Australian Writer's Fellowship	Caitlin Maling			Shortlist
2021	Western Australian Writer's Fellowship	David Whish-Wilson			Shortlist
2021	Western Australian Writer's Fellowship	John Mateer			Shortlist
2021	Western Australian Writer's Fellowship	Julia Lawrinson			Shortlist
2021	Premier's Prize for an Emerging Writer	Elfie Shiosaki	Homecoming	Magabala Books	Winner
2021	Premier's Prize for an Emerging Writer	Cindy Solonec	Debesa	Magabala Books	Shortlist
2021	Premier's Prize for an Emerging Writer	Josephine Taylor	Eye of a Rook	Fremantle Press	Shortlist
2021	Premier's Prize for an Emerging Writer	David Allan-Petale	Locust Summer	Fremantle Press	Shortlist
2021	Premier's Prize for an Emerging Writer	Emily Sun	Vociferate	Fremantle Press	Shortlist
2021	Daisy Utemorrah Award for Unpublished Indigenous Junior and YA Writing	Mariah Sweetman	Robert Runs		Winner
2021	Daisy Utemorrah Award for Unpublished Indigenous Junior and YA Writing	Sean Owen	Jack Trials: Whistling Spider		Shortlist
2021	Daisy Utemorrah Award for Unpublished Indigenous Junior and YA Writing	Shirleyann Wilson	That One Summer		Shortlist
2021	Premier's Prize for Writing for Children	Shirley Marr	A Glasshouse of Stars	Puffin	Winner
2021	Premier's Prize for Writing for Children	Steve Heron	One Thousand Snapshots	Shawline	Shortlist
2021	Premier's Prize for Writing for Children	James Foley	Stellarphant	Fremantle Press	Shortlist
2021	Premier's Prize for Writing for Children	Cristy Burne and Denis Knight	Wednesday Weeks and the Tower of Shadows	Lothian	Shortlist
2021	Premier's Prize for Writing for Children	Katie Stewart	Where Do the Stars Go?	Fremantle Press	Shortlist
2023	Western Australian Writer's Fellowship	Tracy Ryan			Winner
2023	Western Australian Writer's Fellowship	Carolyn Wadley Dowley			Shortlist
2023	Western Australian Writer's Fellowship	Madison Godfrey			Shortlist
2023	Western Australian Writer's Fellowship	Michael Trant			Shortlist
2023	Western Australian Writer's Fellowship	Norman Jorgensen			Shortlist
2023	Premier's Prize for Book of the Year	Nathan Hobby	The Red Witch: A Biography of Katharine Susannah Prichard	Melbourne University Publishing	Winner
2023	Premier's Prize for Book of the Year	Robert Drewe	Nimblefoot	Penguin Random House	
2023	Premier's Prize for Book of the Year	Joe Fox	The Shield and the Spear: the Kimberley Land Council	Magabala Books	
2023	Premier's Prize for Book of the Year	Louise Helfgott	Thistledown Seed: A Memoir	Brandl & Schlesinger	
2023	Premier's Prize for Book of the Year	Scott-Patrick Mitchell	Clean	Upswell Publishing	
2023	Premier's Prize for an Emerging Writer	Josh Kemp	Banjawarn	UWA Publishing	Winner
2023	Premier's Prize for an Emerging Writer	Alan Fyfe	T	Transit Lounge	Shortlist
2023	Premier's Prize for an Emerging Writer	Thomas Simpson	Bone Picker	Ginninderra Press	Shortlist
2023	Premier's Prize for an Emerging Writer	Vivien Stuart	Acacia House	self-published	Shortlist
2023	Premier's Prize for an Emerging Writer	Madeline Te Whiu	The Assassin Thief	New Dawn Publishing	Shortlist
2023	Daisy Utemorrah Award for Unpublished Indigenous Junior and YA Fiction	Jared Thomas	Uncle Xbox (Book 2) - Getting Dusty		Winner
2023	Daisy Utemorrah Award for Unpublished Indigenous Junior and YA Fiction	Kristie Harris	A Queen's Glory		Shortlist
2023	Daisy Utemorrah Award for Unpublished Indigenous Junior and YA Fiction	Kim Morrison	The Ultimate AGD		Shortlist
2023	Premier's Prize for Children's Book of the Year	Leonard Cronin (Chris Nixon, illustrator)	Wild Australian Life	Allen & Unwin	Winner
2023	Premier's Prize for Children's Book of the Year	Moira Court	Lion Is That You	Fremantle Press	Shortlist
2023	Premier's Prize for Children's Book of the Year	Zana Fraillon and Bren MacDibble	The Raven's Song	Allen & Unwin	Shortlist
2023	Premier's Prize for Children's Book of the Year	Helen Milroy	Owl and Star	Fremantle Press	Shortlist
2023	Premier's Prize for Children's Book of the Year	Judith Vun Price and Jacqui Vun	Nenek Tata and the Mangrove Menace	Crotchet Quaver noteworthy publications	Shortlist
2024	Western Australian Writer's Fellowship	Kylie Howarth			Winner
2024	Western Australian Writer's Fellowship	Lucy Dougan			Shortlist
2024	Western Australian Writer's Fellowship	Alan Fyfe			Shortlist
2024	Western Australian Writer's Fellowship	Laurie Steed			Shortlist
2024	Western Australian Writer's Fellowship	Emma Young			Shortlist
2024	Premier's Prize for Book of the Year	Stephen Daisley	A Better Place	Text	Winner
2024	Premier's Prize for Book of the Year	John Kinsella	Cellnight: A Verse Novel	Transit Lounge	Shortlist
2024	Premier's Prize for Book of the Year	Viki Cramer	The Memory of Trees	Thames & Hudson	Shortlist
2024	Premier's Prize for Book of the Year	Paul Grace	Operation Hurricane	Hachette	Shortlist
2024	Premier's Prize for Book of the Year	Jill Griffiths	What's for Dinner?	Thames & Hudson	Shortlist
2024	Premier's Prize for an Emerging Writer	Michael Thomas	The Map of William	Fremantle Press	Winner
2024	Premier's Prize for an Emerging Writer	Chemutai Glasheen	I Am the Mau and Other Stories	Fremantle Press	Shortlist
2024	Premier's Prize for an Emerging Writer	Georgia Tree	Old Boy	Fremantle Press	Shortlist
2024	Premier's Prize for an Emerging Writer	Molly Schmidt	Salt River Road	Fremantle Press	Shortlist
2024	Premier's Prize for an Emerging Writer	Gemma Nisbet	The Things We Live With	Upswell	Shortlist
2024	Daisy Utemorrah Award for Unpublished Indigenous Junior and YA Fiction	Marly and Linda Wells	"Dusty Tracks"		Winner
2024	Daisy Utemorrah Award for Unpublished Indigenous Junior and YA Fiction	Stephen Hagan	"Acacia: 6 Eyes on Yesterday"		Shortlist
2024	Daisy Utemorrah Award for Unpublished Indigenous Junior and YA Fiction	Maureen Glover	"Brothers in Arms"		Shortlist
2024	Daisy Utemorrah Award for Unpublished Indigenous Junior and YA Fiction	Elise Thornthwaite	"Underneath the Surface"		Shortlist
2024	Premier's Prize for Children's Book of the Year	Dianne Wolfer	Scout and the Rescue Dogs	Walker Books	Winner
2024	Premier's Prize for Children's Book of the Year	Julia Lawrinson (Heather Potter & Mark Jackson, illustrators)	City of Light	Wild Dog	Shortlist
2024	Premier's Prize for Children's Book of the Year	Ash Harrier	The Eerie Excavation: An Alice England mystery	Pantera	Shortlist
2024	Premier's Prize for Children's Book of the Year	Gabriel Evans	A Friend for George	Puffin	Shortlist
2024	Premier's Prize for Children's Book of the Year	Mark Greenwood (Frané Lessac, illustrator)	Our Country: Where History Happened	Walker Books	Shortlist
2025	Book of the Year	Alan Fyfe	G-d, Sleep, and Chaos	Gazebo	Winner
2025	Fiction Book of the Year	Louise Wolhuter	Shadows of Winter Robins	Ultimo	Winner
2025	Fiction Book of the Year	Annie Raser-Rowland	Once	Gratton Street	Shortlist
2025	Fiction Book of the Year	Sarah Winifred Searle	A Home in Her	Gestault	Shortlist
2025	Fiction Book of the Year	Alexander Thorpe	Death Holds the Key	Fremantle	Shortlist
2025	Fiction Book of the Year	David Whish-Wilson	Cutler	Fremantle	Shortlist
2025	Nonfiction Book of the Year	Gerard McCann	Anatomy of a Secret	Fremantle	Winner
2025	Nonfiction Book of the Year	Wayne Bergmann & Madelaine Dickie	Some People Want to Shoot Me	Fremantle	Shortlist
2025	Nonfiction Book of the Year	Paul Hardisty	In Hot Water: Inside the battle to save the Great Barrier Reef	Affirm	Shortlist
2025	Nonfiction Book of the Year	Julia Lawrinson	How to Avoid a Happy Life	Fremantle	Shortlist
2025	Nonfiction Book of the Year	Tracy Westerman	Jilya	UQP	Shortlist
2025	Poetry Book of the Year	Alan Fyfe	G-d, Sleep, and Chaos	Gazebo	Winner
2025	Poetry Book of the Year	Nandi Chinna and Anne Poelina	Tossed Up by the Beak of a Cormorant	Fremantle	Shortlist
2025	Poetry Book of the Year	Chris Palazzolo	Personal Logistics	Fremantle	Shortlist
2025	Emerging Writer	Emily Tsokos Purtill	Matia	University of Western Australia Press	Winner
2025	Emerging Writer	Katherine Allum	The Skeleton House	Fremantle Press	Shortlist
2025	Emerging Writer	Shaeden Berry	Down the Rabbit Hole	Echo Books	Shortlist
2025	Emerging Writer	Daniel Juckes	The Moment of the Essay: Australian Letters and the Personal Essay	University of Western Australia Press	Shortlist
2025	Emerging Writer	Khin Myint	Fragile Creatures: A Memoir	Black Inc.	Shortlist
2025	Daisy Utemorrah Award for Unpublished Indigenous Junior and YA Fiction	Beau Windon	" Jax Paperweight and the Neon Starway "		Winner
2025	Daisy Utemorrah Award for Unpublished Indigenous Junior and YA Fiction	Krista Dunstan	" Noble Intentions "		Shortlist
2025	Daisy Utemorrah Award for Unpublished Indigenous Junior and YA Fiction	Jannali Jones	" The Takeback Heist "		Shortlist
2025	Children's Book of the Year	Kelly Canby	A Leaf Called Greaf	Fremantle	Winner
2025	Children's Book of the Year	Jenny Davis	Courage be my Friend	Fremantle	Shortlist
2025	Children's Book of the Year	Juluwarlu Group, illustrated by Juluwarlu Art Group & Alex Mankiewicz	When the World Was Soft	Allen & Unwin	Shortlist
2025	Children's Book of the Year	Bren MacDibble	The Apprentice Witnesser	Allen & Unwin	Shortlist
2025	Children's Book of the Year	Renée Treml	Goodnight, Joeys	Puffin	Shortlist
2025	Young Adult Book of the Year	Kate Emery	My Family and Other Suspects	Allen & Unwin	Winner
2025	Young Adult Book of the Year	Donna Hughes	Trackers	Currency	Shortlist
2025	Young Adult Book of the Year	Ambelin Kwaymullina	Liar's Test	Text	Shortlist
2025	Young Adult Book of the Year	Karleah Olson	A Wreck of Seabirds	Fremantle	Shortlist
2025	Young Adult Book of the Year	Scott Wilson & Molly Hunt, illustrated by Chris Wood	Dreamwalker #1	Gestalt	Shortlist
2026	Book of the Year	Mabel Gibson	CryBaby	Night Parrot Press	Winner
2026	Fiction Book of the Year	David Whish-Wilson	O'Keefe	Fremantle Press	Winner
2026	Fiction Book of the Year	Rosanne Dingli	Chance and Necessity: A Novel of Narrogin and Williams	self-published	Shortlist
2026	Fiction Book of the Year	Sara Foster	When She Was Gone	HarperCollins	Shortlist
2026	Fiction Book of the Year	Holden Sheppard	King of Dirt	Pantera Press	Shortlist
2026	Fiction Book of the Year	Tasma Walton	I Am Nannertgarrook	Bundyi	Shortlist
2026	Nonfiction Book of the Year	Jan Turner and Lizzie Marrkilyi Giles Ellis	Tjukurrpa Kurranyu. Tjukurrpa in the Front: The Yarnangu foundation for joint management in the Pila Nature Reserve	Warnpurru Aboriginal Corporation	Winner
2026	Nonfiction Book of the Year	David Blacker	My FIGHT with PD: A Neurologist with Parkinson's Disease	The Book Reality Experience	Shortlist
2026	Nonfiction Book of the Year	Elizabeth Green	No Time for Makeup: The Life of a Flying Doctor and Paediatrician	Exisle	Shortlist
2026	Nonfiction Book of the Year	Geoff Hutchison	How Not to Become a Grumpy Old Bugger: A Bloke's Guide to Living a Better Life	Affirm Press	Shortlist
2026	Nonfiction Book of the Year	David Price	The Shameful Isles: The True Story of North-West Australia's Fatal Experiment with Medical Apartheid	Fremantle Press	Shortlist
2026	Dr Charmaine Papertalk Green Smith Poetry Prize	Kaya Ortiz	Past & Parallel Lives	UWA Publishing	Winner
2026	Dr Charmaine Papertalk Green Smith Poetry Prize	Lisa Collyer	Gold Digger	NewSouth	Shortlist
2026	Dr Charmaine Papertalk Green Smith Poetry Prize	Jennifer Kornberger	The Twilight Observatory	5 Islands Press	Shortlist
2026	Dr Charmaine Papertalk Green Smith Poetry Prize	Shey Marque	The Hum Hearers	UWA Publishing	Shortlist
2026	Emerging Writer	Mabel Gibson	CryBaby	Night Parrot Press	Winner
2026	Emerging Writer	Patrick Marlborough	Nock Loose	Fremantle Press	Shortlist
2026	Emerging Writer	Andrew H. C. McDonald	The Montegiallo School of Swearing	Fremantle Press	Shortlist
2026	Emerging Writer	Stephen B. Platt	Inner Demons	New Dawn	Shortlist
2026	Emerging Writer	Andrea Thompson	Geraldine	Fremantle Press	Shortlist
2026	Daisy Utemorrah Award for Unpublished Indigenous Junior and YA Fiction	Amanda Lott	"Barefoot Running"		Winner
2026	Daisy Utemorrah Award for Unpublished Indigenous Junior and YA Fiction	Junaidah Mamid	"Off by a Mark"		Shortlist
2026	Daisy Utemorrah Award for Unpublished Indigenous Junior and YA Fiction	Elise Thornthwaite	"Saltwater, City Lights"		Shortlist
2026	Children's Book of the Year	Gavin Aung Than	Creature Clinic	Hardie Grant Children's Publishing	Winner
2026	Children's Book of the Year	Kitty Black	Everglade 1: Rise of the Witch	Affirm Kids	Shortlist
2026	Children's Book of the Year	James Foley	Bigfoot vs Yeti	Fremantle Press	Shortlist
2026	Children's Book of the Year	Shirley Marr and Michael Speechley	One Day	Walker Australia Studio	Shortlist
2026	Children's Book of the Year	H. M. Waugh	The Surface Trials	A&U Children's	Shortlist
2026	Young Adult Book of the Year	Kate Emery	A Murder is Going Down	A&U Children's	Winner
2026	Young Adult Book of the Year	Bianca Breen	Made of Steam and Stardust	Stag Beetle Books	Shortlist
2026	Young Adult Book of the Year	Cristy Burne, Jackson Harvey and Alex Towler	A New World Rises: Tales of a LEGO® Future	Fremantle Press	Shortlist
2026	Young Adult Book of the Year	Julia Lawrinson	Trapped!	Fremantle Press	Shortlist
2026	Young Adult Book of the Year	Peter Purchase	The Dreams of Summer Dartson	Dune Publishing	Shortlist
