= 1998 in Australian literature =

This article presents a list of the historical events and publications of Australian literature during 1998.

== Events ==
- Peter Carey (novelist) won the Miles Franklin Award for Jack Maggs
- The NSW Premier's Literary Awards were not presented as the eligibility dates were amended

== Major publications ==
=== Novels ===
- Murray Bail – Eucalyptus
- Carmel Bird – Red Shoes
- Bryce Courtenay – Jessica
- Luke Davies – Candy: A Novel of Love and Addiction
- Martin Flanagan – The Call
- Marion Halligan – The Golden Dress
- Colleen McCullough – The Song of Troy
- Roger McDonald – Mr Darwin's Shooter
- Les Murray – Fredy Neptune: A Novel in Verse
- Elliot Perlman – Three Dollars
- Morris West – Eminence

=== Short story anthologies ===
- Jack Dann & Janeen Webb (ed) – Dreaming Down-Under

=== Science fiction and fantasy ===
- Stephen Dedman – "A Walk-On Part in the War"
- Sara Douglass – Pilgrim
- Greg Egan
  - Luminous (short story collection)
  - "Oceanic"
  - "The Planck Dive"
- Ian Irvine – A Shadow on the Glass
- Dave Luckett – A Dark Winter
- Jane Routley – Fire Angels

=== Crime & mystery ===
- Jon Cleary – A Different Turf
- Peter Corris – The Black Prince
- Peter Doyle – Amaze Your Friends
- Gabrielle Lord – The Sharp End
- Shane Maloney – Nice Try
- Andrew Masterson – The Last Days
- Matthew Reilly – Ice Station
- Peter Temple – An Iron Rose

=== Children's and young adult fiction ===
- Kim Caraher – The Cockroach Cup
- Garry Disher – The Divine Wind
- Alison Goodman – Singing the Dogstar Blues
- Phillip Gwynne – Deadly, Unna?
- James Moloney – Angela

=== Poetry ===
- Lee Cataldi – Race Against Time
- Lucy Dougan – Memory Shell
- Jean Kent – The Satin Bowerbird
- John Kinsella – The Hunt and Other Poems
- Anthony Lawrence – New and Selected Poems
- Gig Ryan – Pure and Applied

=== Drama ===
- Jane Harrison – Stolen
- Katherine Thomson – Navigating

=== Non-fiction ===
- Diane Armstrong – Mosaic: A Chronicle of Five Generations
- Bruce Bennett and Jennifer Strauss (eds.) – The Oxford Literary History of Australia
- Raimond Gaita – Romulus, My Father
- Dorothy McRae-McMahon – Everyday Passions: A Conversation on Living
- Peter Robb – M
- Mandy Sayer – Dreamtime Alice

== Awards and honours ==
- John Harber Phillips AC "for service to the law, the administration of justice, law reform and education as Chief Justice of the Supreme Court of Victoria, and for his contributions to literature, the visual arts and the community"
- John R. Philip AO "for service to the science of hydrology, to scientific communication in promoting the interests of science for the community, and the Australian culture through architecture and literature"
- Anne Fairbairn AM "for service to Australian literature as a poet and to international relations, particularly between Australia and the Middle East through translations of poetry and cultural exchanges"
- A. W. Martin AM "for service in the field of Australian historiography as a teacher and scholar, and biographer and as foundation professor of the History Department at La Trobe University"
- Elizabeth Burchill OAM "for service to nursing, particularly as an historian, author and philanthropist"
- Michael Noonan OAM "for service to the arts as an author of numerous novels, works of non-fiction, television scripts and plays"

=== Lifetime achievement ===
Award	Author
Christopher Brennan Award	Jennifer Maiden
Patrick White Award	Alma De Groen

=== Literary ===
Award	Author	Title	Publisher
The Age Book of the Year Award	Elliot Perlman	Three Dollars	Picador
ALS Gold Medal	James Cowan	A Mapmaker's Dream	Shambhala Publications
Colin Roderick Award	Robert Dessaix	(And So Forth)	Pan Macmillan
Nita Kibble Literary Award	Roberta Sykes	Snake Cradle	Allen & Unwin

=== Fiction ===
==== International ====
Award	Category	Author	Title	Publisher
Commonwealth Writers' Prize	Best Novel, SE Asia and South Pacific region	Peter Carey	Jack Maggs	University of Queensland Press
Commonwealth Writers' Prize	Best First Novel, SE Asia and South Pacific region	Emma Tom	Deadset	Random House
Commonwealth Writers' Prize	Best Overall Novel	Peter Carey	Jack Maggs	University of Queensland Press

==== National ====
Award	Author	Title	Publisher
Adelaide Festival Awards for Literature	Robert Drewe	The Drowner	Pan MacMillan
The Age Book of the Year Award	Elliot Perlman	Three Dollars	Picador
The Australian/Vogel Literary Award	Jennifer Kremmer	Pegasus in the Suburbs	Allen and Unwin
Kathleen Mitchell Award	James Bradley	Wrack	Random House Australia
Miles Franklin Award	Peter Carey	Jack Maggs	University of Queensland Press
New South Wales Premier's Literary Awards	Not awarded		
Victorian Premier's Literary Awards	Richard Flanagan	The Sound of One Hand Clapping	Pan Macmillan Australia
Western Australian Premier's Book Awards	Pat Jacobs	Going Inland	Fremantle Arts Centre Press

=== Crime and Mystery ===
==== National ====
Award	Category	Author	Title	Publisher
Ned Kelly Award
Ned Kelly Award	Novel	Not awarded		
Ned Kelly Award	First novel	Not awarded		
Ned Kelly Award	Lifetime Achievement	Not awarded		

=== Children and Young Adult ===
Award	Category	Author	Title	Publisher
Adelaide Festival Awards for Literature	Children's	Robin Klein	The Listmaker	Viking Penguin
Children's Book of the Year Award	Older Readers	Catherine Jinks	Eye to Eye	Puffin Books
Children's Book of the Year Award	Picture Book	Junko Morimoto, translated by Isao Morimoto	The Two Bullies	Random House
New South Wales Premier's Literary Awards	Young People's Literature	Not awarded		
Victorian Premier's Prize for Young Adult Fiction		Judith Clarke	Night Train	Penguin

=== Poetry ===
Award	Author	Title	Publisher
Adelaide Festival Awards for Literature	Peter Boyle	The Blue Cloud of Crying	Hale and Ironmonger
The Age Book of the Year Award	John Kinsella	The Hunt and Other Poems	Fremantle Press
Anne Elder Award	Amanda Stewart	I/T: Selected Poems 1980-1996	Here and There Books
Anne Elder Award	Jane Williams	Outside Temple Boundaries	Five Islands Press
Grace Leven Prize for Poetry	Not awarded		
Mary Gilmore Award	Emma Lew	The Wild Reply	Black Pepper Publishing
New South Wales Premier's Literary Awards	Not awarded		
Victorian Premier's Literary Awards	Coral Hull	Broken Land	Five Islands Press
Western Australian Premier's Book Awards	Fay Zwicky	The Gatekeeper's Wife	Brandl & Schlesinger
Western Australian Premier's Book Awards	John Kinsella	The Hunt and Other Poems	Fremantle Arts Centre Press

=== Drama ===
Award	Category	Author	Title
New South Wales Premier's Literary Awards	FilmScript	Not awarded	
New South Wales Premier's Literary Awards	Play	Not awarded	
Victorian Premier's Literary Awards	Drama	Daniel Keene	Every Minute, Every Hour, Every Day

=== Non-fiction ===
Award	Category	Author	Title	Publisher
Adelaide Festival Awards for Literature	Non-Fiction	David Day	Claiming a Continent: A History of Australia	HarperCollins
The Age Book of the Year Award	Non-Fiction	Stuart MacIntyre	The Reds	Allen and Unwin
National Biography Award	Biography	Roberta Sykes	Snake Cradle	Allen and Unwin
New South Wales Premier's Literary Awards	Non-Fiction	Not awarded		
Victorian Premier's Literary Awards	Non-Fiction	Raimond Gaita	Romulus, My Father	Text Publishing

== Deaths ==
A list, ordered by date of death (and, if the date is either unspecified or repeated, ordered alphabetically by surname) of deaths in 1998 of Australian literary figures, authors of written works or literature-related individuals follows, including year of birth.

- 23 January – John Forbes, poet (born 1950)
- 11 May – John Morrison, novelist and short story writer (born 1904)
- 14 May – Kay Glasson Taylor, novelist (born 1893)
- 3 July – Elizabeth Riddell, poet and journalist, also known as Betty Riddell (born 1910)
- 4 September – Elizabeth Kata, writer whose real name was Elizabeth Katayama (born 1912)
- 17 September – Geoffrey Dutton, author and historian (born 1922)
- 27 November – Vicki Viidikas, poet and writer (born 1948)
- 19 December – James McQueen (writer), novelist and short story writer (born 1934)

== See also ==
- 1998 in Australia
- 1998 in literature
- 1998 in poetry
- List of years in literature
- List of years in Australian literature
