= James Foley (author) =

Australian children's writer and illustrator (born 1982)

- Born: 1982 (age 43–44); East Fremantle, Australia
- Education: University of Notre Dame Australia (Bachelor of Behavioural Science)
- Occupations: Children's author and illustrator
- Spouse: Renae Hayward
- Children: 2
- Website: www.jamesfoley.com.au

James Foley (born 1982) is an Australian children's writer and illustrator.

His notable works include Stellarphant (2021), My Dead Bunny (2015), the Secret Agent Mole series (2023–2024), Chickensaurus (2020), Brobot (2016), In The Lion (2012) and The Last Viking (2011). Foley's picture books, graphic novels and chapter books are known for "their humour, understanding of children and witty illustrations". His work has received recognition both in Australia and internationally.

== Early life ==
Foley was born in East Fremantle, Australia in 1982. The earliest children's books he remembers reading are Sunshine and Moonlight by Jan Ormerod; as they were wordless, he could 'read' the stories to himself. Animalia and The Eleventh Hour by Graeme Base were later favourites. As a teenager, Foley attended workshops run by Shaun Tan at The Literature Centre; seeing Tan's original art provided much inspiration.

In 1994 when Foley was in grade 7, he entered a picture book into the Children's Book Council of Australia (WA Branch) Make Your Own Story Book competition; he received third place in the year 6-7 picture book category. Foley later made cartoons and comics for his high school newspaper, then for his university newspapers: the Western Independent at Curtin University, and Quasimodo at the University of Notre Dame Australia, Fremantle. Foley spent three years at Curtin University: he studied journalism and graphic design for one year before switching to primary teaching, but did not finish the degree. He ultimately completed a Bachelor of Behavioural Science at Notre Dame, Fremantle, graduating 'with distinction' in 2006.

Foley's first major illustration job was creating cover cartoons for the Quokka newspaper between 2003 and 2010.

== Career ==
Foley's first picture book, The Last Viking, was written by Norman Jorgensen and published by Fremantle Press in 2011. The book won the 2012 Society of Children's Book Writers and Illustrators Crystal Kite Award for Australia and New Zealand. It was also shortlisted for the 2022 CBCA Book of the Year Award: Early Childhood.

Foley's second picture book In The Lion was also his first as both author and illustrator. In The Lion received a Notable Book in the 2013 CBCA Children's Book of the Year Award: Picture Book category, and was included as one of the recommended Australian titles in the International Youth Library's 2012 White Ravens list.

My Dead Bunny was released in 2015. Written by Sigi Cohen, this tongue-in-cheek picture book for older readers was shortlisted in the 2016 CBCA Children's Book of the Year Award: Picture Book category, and received recognition in several Australian children's choice awards.

Foley's 2021 picture book Stellarphant was critically acclaimed and received multiple awards: it won the 2022 CBCA Sun Project: Shadowers’ Choice Award for Picture Book of the Year, received an Honour Book award in the 2022 CBCA Children's Book of the Year Award: Picture Book category, was listed in the International Youth Library’s 2022 White Ravens List, and was number 36 in the 2022 Better Reading Top 50 Kids' Books. Stellarphant was also shortlisted in the Western Australian Premier's Book Awards, the Aurealis Awards and several Australian children's choice awards. Stellarphant has been published in North America, Turkey, the Netherlands, South Korea, China and Italy, and was adapted for the stage by Western Australia's Barking Gecko Theatre Company.

== Community work ==
Foley has been a member of the Society of Children's Book Writers and Illustrators Australia West regional team since 2012, holding roles including Illustrator Coordinator, Regional Advisor and Treasurer.

Foley is a judge for the Shaun Tan Award for Young Artists.

Foley is an ambassador for Books in Homes Australia and Room to Read.

== Personal life ==
Foley lives and works in Fremantle, Western Australia. He is married to fellow children's author Renae Hayward. They have two children and a labrador named Frankie.

== Awards ==
Bigfoot vs Yeti: A Love Story

- Notable Book, 2026 Children's Book Council of Australia Awards: Picture Book of the Year category
- Shortlist, 2026 Young Australian Best Book Awards (YABBAs): Picture Book category
- Shortlist, 2026 Kids’ Own Australian Literature Awards (KOALAs): Picture Book category
- Shortlist, 2025 Australian Psychological Society Children's Peace Literature Award
- Shortlist, 2026 Children's Book of the Year, Western Australian Premier's Book Awards

Happy Barry Capybara

- Honour Book, 2025 YABBAs: Picture Book category
- Honour Book, 2025 KOALAs: Picture Book category
- Shortlist, 2025 Kids’ Reading Oz Choice Awards (KROCs): Picture Book category
- Shortlist, 2026 Western Australian Young Readers Book Awards, (WAYRBAs): Picture Book category

Secret Agent Mole book 3: Dr Nude

- Shortlist, Australian Library and Information Association Graphic Notables of 2024
- Shortlist, 2026 WAYRBAs: Younger Readers category

Secret Agent Mole book 2: The Boar Identity

- Shortlist, 2024 Comic Arts Awards of Australia

Secret Agent Mole book 1: Goldfish-Finger

- Shortlist, 2024 Comic Arts Awards of Australia
- Shortlist, 2024 WAYRBAs, Younger Reader category

Stellarphant

- Winner, 2022 Children's Book Council of Australia Sun Project: Shadowers’ Choice Awards: Picture Book of the Year category
- Honour Book, 2022 Children’s Book Council of Australia Awards: Picture Book of the Year category
- Shortlist, 2023 KOALA Awards: Picture Book category
- Shortlist, 2023 YABBA Awards: Picture Book category
- Shortlist, 2023 KROC Awards: Picture Book category
- Shortlist, 2023 WAYRBAs: Picture Book category
- International Youth Library’s White Ravens List, 2022
- #36 in the 2022 Better Reading Top 50 Kids' Books
- Shortlist, 2021 Aurealis Awards: Best Children’s Fiction category
- Shortlist, 2022 Society of Children’s Book Writers and Illustrators Crystal Kite Award (Australia/New Zealand)
- Shortlist, 2021 Western Australian Premier’s Book Awards: The Premier’s Prize for Writing for Children
- Shortlist, 2022 Speech Pathology Australia's Book of the Year Awards

Chickensaurus

- Shortlist, 2021 Comic Arts Awards of Australia
- Longlist, 2020 Australian Library and Information Association Notable Australian Graphic Novels

Toffle Towers, Book 1

- Shortlist, 2021 and 2025, KOALA Awards: Fiction for Older Readers category
- Shortlist, 2021 and 2025, YABBA Awards: Fiction for Older Readers category
- Shortlist, 2021 and 2025, KROC Awards: Fiction for Older Readers category

Dungzilla

- Finalist, 2017 Aurealis Awards: Graphic Novel/Illustrated Work category
- Shortlist, 2019 West Australian Young Readers’ Book Awards: Younger Readers category

Brobot

- Shortlist, 2017 West Australian Young Readers’ Book Awards: Younger Readers category
- Finalist, 2016 Aurealis Awards: Graphic Novel/Illustrated Work category

My Dead Bunny

- Shortlist, 2016 Children’s Book Council of Australia Awards: Picture Book of the Year category
- Honour Award, 2017 KOALA Awards: Fiction for Older Readers category
- Shortlist, 2017 YABBA Awards: Fiction for Older Readers category
- Shortlist, 2017 KROC Awards: Fiction for Older Readers category

The Last Viking Returns

- Winner, 2015 West Australian Young Readers’ Hoffman Award
- Shortlist, 2015 West Australian Young Readers’ Book Awards: Picture Book category
- Finalist, 2014 Aurealis Awards: Best Children's Fiction

In The Lion

- International Youth Library’s White Raven list 2013
- Notable Book, 2013 Children’s Book Council of Australia Awards: Picture Book of the Year category
- Shortlist, 2014 West Australian Young Readers’ Book Awards: Picture Book category

The Last Viking

- Winner, 2012 Society of Children’s Book Writers and Illustrators Crystal Kite Award (Australia/New Zealand)
- Winner, 2012 West Australian Young Readers’ Hoffman Award
- Shortlist, 2012 Children's Book Council of Australia Awards, Early Childhood Book of the Year
- Notable Book, 2012 Children’s Book Council of Australia Awards, Picture Book of the Year
- Shortlist, 2012 Adelaide Festival Awards for Literature
- Finalist, 2011 Aurealis Awards

== Bibliography ==
Picture books

- Oh No!, 2026
- Fuzzball, 2026 (written by Nathan Luff)
- Happy Barry Capybara Gone Bananas, 2026
- Bigfoot vs Yeti: A Love Story, 2025
- Happy Barry Capybara, 2024
- Stellarphant, 2021
- There's Something Weird About Lena, 2020 (written by Sigi Cohen)
- My Dead Bunny, 2015 (written by Sigi Cohen)
- The Last Viking Returns, 2014 (written by Norman Jorgensen)
- In The Lion, 2012
- The Last Viking, 2011 (written by Norman Jorgensen)

Graphic novels

- Chickensaurus (colour edition), 2025
- Dungzilla (colour edition), 2025 (includes the One Small Step for Mammoth comic serial)
- Gastronauts (colour edition), 2024 (includes the Get Kraken comic serial)
- Brobot (colour edition), 2024 (includes the Sallymander comic serial)
- Secret Agent Mole, book 3: Dr Nude, 2024
- Secret Agent Mole, book 2: The Boar Identity, 2023
- Secret Agent Mole, book 1: Goldfish-Finger, 2023
- Chickensaurus, 2020
- Gastronauts, 2018
- Dungzilla, 2017
- Brobot, 2016

Comic serials

- Sallymander, 2022 (published in the School Magazine)
- Get Kraken, 2021 (published in the School Magazine)
- One Small Step for Mammoth, 2021 (edited version of the Stellarphant comic serial from 2019, published in The West Australian newspaper)
- Dungzilla, 2020 (abridged version, published in The West Australian newspaper)
- Stellarphant, 2019 (published in the School Magazine)
- Brobot, 2019 (abridged version, published in The West Australian newspaper)

Chapter books

- Paw Prints: Fuzzball, 2026 (written by Nathan Luff)
- Toffle Towers 3: Order in the Court, 2020 (written by Tim Harris)
- Toffle Towers 2: The Great River Race, 2020 (written by Tim Harris)
- Toffle Towers 1: Fully Booked, 2019 (written by Tim Harris)

Anthologies

- Right Way Down, 2024 (edited by Rebecca Newman and Sally Murphy)
- Funny Bones, 2019 (edited by Kate and Jol Temple)
- Total Quack Up, 2018 (edited by Adrian Beck and Sally Rippin)
