= University of Western Australia Library =

Library at the University of Western Australia

Coordinates: 31.9790°S 115.8178°E

- View across the Great Court to Reid Library
- Location: Perth, Western Australia, Australia
- Type: Academic Library
- Established: 1913

Other information
- Parent organization: University of Western Australia
- Website: uwa.edu.au/library/home

The University of Western Australia Library is a library system consisting of five library sites on and near the campus. The libraries are known to support a wide range or services and facilities, including teaching. learning, research and IT support, and learning spaces.

== History ==
When the University of Western Australia began teaching students in 1913 and the first building was constructed at the Irwin Street site, just £2000 was set aside to purchase roughly one hundred books.

A Music branch library had been set up as early as 1935, many years before the UWA Music department was established. In the 1960s, the library was named the Wigmore Music Library following substantial gifts from violinist Alice Ivy Wigmore, in honour of her mother. A purpose-built building for the Wigmore Music Library was opened in 1976, including discussion rooms and areas for informal study. This library building was repurposed in 2020 by the UWA Conservatorium of Music as a space for practice and performance, and is now called the Wigmore Music Studio. The Music Library collection, now housed in Reid Library, includes scores, performing editions of musical works, sound recordings, DVDs/videos, reference books, and scholarly journals.

Technological improvements became even more significant in the 1980s as Arthur Ellis, Jolley's successor as University Librarian, worked to expand the collections of audio-visual and electronic materials and began the process of computerising the library's catalogues.

A steady increase in the number of UWA students owning laptops and tablets resulted in demand for student IT support and for the first time in Semester 1, 2013, students could go to the information desks in the libraries for assistance with Pheme passwords, Unifi connections, Learning Management System (LMS) troubleshooting, online class registrations (OLCR) and other university applications and systems.

== Buildings ==
=== Reid Library ===
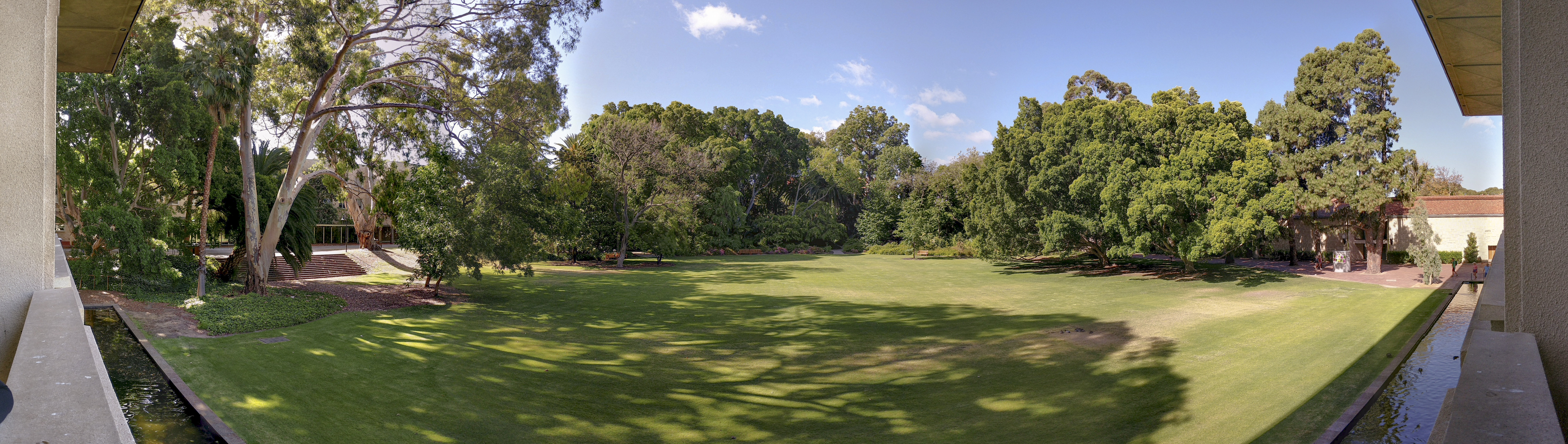
A panoramic view from the first floor entrance of the Reid Library looking North in the direction of the Tropical Grove

Named after Sir Alexander Reid (UWA Chancellor 1956–1968), the Reid Library opened its doors to readers in February 1964, with its official opening taking place the following May 1964. The building opened to widespread acclaim, winning the Royal Institute of British Architects (RIBA) 1964 Bronze Medal and being regarded as one of Australia's most attractive university buildings.

=== Barry J Marshall Library ===
Formerly known as the Science Library, the Barry J Marshall Library was renamed in 2015 after Professor Barry J Marshall.

The Science Library opened in 2009, as an extension to the existing Biological Sciences library. It combined collections from the Maths and Physical Sciences, Undergraduate Physical Sciences, Geology, Maps, and Biological Sciences Libraries.

=== Education, Fine Arts and Architecture (EDFAA) Library ===
The Education, Fine Arts and Architecture (EDFAA) Library is located on the Nedlands campus and was opened in 1993.

The EDFAA Library sustained significant flood damage during the 2010 Western Australian storms, which ruined nearly 12,000 items in the collection. The new EDFAA Library re-opened in February 2012. Items in the EDFAA collection are tagged with both Radio-frequency identification (RFID) tags and traditional barcodes.

=== J Robin Warren Library ===
The J Robin Warren Library (formerly known as Medical and Dental Library) is located on Monash Avenue next to the Oral Health Centre of Western Australia and the Queen Elizabeth II Medical Centre. The opening of the library at the end of 2001 brought together the collections from the Medical Library on the Queen Elizabeth II Hospital site and the Dental Library housed in the Perth Dental Hospital. At the time of its official opening in April 2002 by Sir Ronald Wilson, it was recognised as the largest medical and dental collection in Western Australia. The library is named after Professor (John) Robin Warren, a co-recipient, with Professor Barry J Marshall, of the Nobel Prize for Medicine in 2005 for their discovery that stomach ulcers were caused by the bacteria Helicobacter pylori.

=== Beasley Law Library ===
The Beasley Law Library, named after Professer Frank Beasley, opened in 1967 and was designed by Gus Ferguson, who later received a Royal Australian Institute of Architects Bronze Medal in 1969 for his contribution. It is the primary law library of the university and was refurbished in 2017 as part of the law school's 90 year anniversary celebrations.

== Special Collections ==
The library's Special Collections are housed on the second floor of the Reid Library building and focus on Australian literature and the history of the Indian Ocean Region. The Australian literature collection includes over 700 volumes of poetry by Western Australian writers and personal papers from many well-known Australian authors including Albert Facey, Arthur Upfield, Robert Drewe, John Kinsella, Tracy Ryan, Dave Warner, Dennis Haskell and Peter Cowan. The archives of the literary magazine Westerly are also available.

The Indian Ocean collections also include the Frank Broeze Memorial Library which contains a considerable amount of Dutch and German material on maritime history and shipping, and the Erulkar Collection focused on the history of the Eastern Indian Ocean region, especially the maritime history of India.

== The Friends of the UWA Library ==
The Friends of the UWA Library held their inaugural meeting in Winthrop Hall on July 25, 1965. Later that year, Sir Walter Murdoch became the patron and they hosted their first talk with Mr G.G. Allen presenting on 'Old Books in a Modern Library'. Over the years, the Friends have supported the library and donated many rare and valuable items for Special Collections in the Reid Library.

The Friends of the Library dissolved in 2020 due to declining membership

== Digital research initiatives ==
The library developed and manages the UWA Research Repository which is an open access platform to capture, store, index, and distribute globally a wide range of research outputs produced by the university's researchers and postgraduate students. It contains peer-reviewed journal articles, book chapters, books, conference papers, creative works and UWA theses (masters and doctorate degrees by research).

The library (previously, as Information Services) developed two digital services for the management of research data:

- The Institutional Research Data Store (IRDS) provides researchers with a centralised, secure and UWA-supported data storage facility in which to store electronic research data, enabling ongoing access to these assets. This service is now managed by Information Governance Services (IGS); and
- Research Data Online (RDO) provides open or mediated access to research datasets held at The University of Western Australia.

=== Australian digital initiatives ===
The library has also developed or contributed to the following Australian digital services:

- Management of Australian National Data Service (ANDS) projects and contribution to Research Data Australia;
- AustLit is a resource for information about Australian literature, for which the UWA Library is the Western Australian node;
- Australian Data Archive;
- Guide to Australian Literary Manuscripts: a collection of more than eighty finding aids for literary manuscript collections in major Australian research libraries (using Encoded Archival Description); and
- HuNI (Humanities Networked Infrastructure) Virtual Laboratory.
