= Locust Summer =

2021 novel by David Allan-Petale

- Author: David Allan-Petale
- Publisher: Fremantle Press
- Publication date: 2021
- Pages: 240
- ISBN: 9781925816365

Locust Summer is a 2021 book by the West Australian journalist David Allan-Petale. The book, which was Allan-Petale's debut novel, was shortlisted for The Australian/Vogel Literary Award and the Western Australian Premier's Prize for an Emerging Writer.

== Plot ==
Locust Summer is set in 1986. A man named Rowan Brockman reluctantly returns home to his family farm to help with the harvest after a decline in his father's health and the death of his brother, while the family prepares to sell the property.

== Reception ==
Locust Summer was reviewed in The Age, Westerly, The Australian, and The West Australian.

== Awards ==
Awards for Locust Summer
Year	Award	Category	Result	Ref.
2017	The Australian/Vogel Literary Award	—	Shortlisted	
2022	Western Australian Premier's Book Awards	Premier's Prize for an Emerging Writer	Shortlisted	
