= Destroying Avalon =

2006 teen novel by Kate McCaffrey

Avalon
- First edition
- Author: Kate McCaffrey
- Language: English
- Genre: novel
- Set in: Perth
- Publisher: Fremantle Arts Centre Press
- Publication date: 2006
- Publication place: Australia
- Media type: Print
- Pages: 264
- ISBN: 9781921064579
- OCLC: 7

Destroying Avalon is a 2006 teen novel by Australian author Kate McCaffrey. The story follows fourteen-year-old Avalon as she moves from the country to an urban high school.

In 2006, the book was the winning entry in the "Young Adult's Books" category of the Western Australian Premier's Book Awards. In 2010, the book was added to the optional reading list for the New South Wales HSC English syllabus in Australia.

== Synopsis ==
Avalon and her family move from Grace Point to a coastal suburb in Perth for the start of Year 10. Her new school is huge, an environment vastly different from her old country school. Intimidated by the sophistication of the other students and embarrassed by her sheltered background Avalon attempts to ingratiate herself with the popular peer group and as a consolation, she is befriended by the social outcasts, the Weirdos and Queeros. Desperate not to be labelled the same, Avalon attempts to find another social group but her advances are crushed by the Bitches, who make their feelings to the school body known.

A text message directing her to an email leads her to a blog site, used by students at her school, and a hate campaign begins.

Daily, vicious lies are spread about her across the Net and through text messages. The organiser of the hate campaign is Dragon Girl — who Avalon believes is Alice, the leader of the Bitches. Avalon is hassled at school by students she does not even know and becomes obsessed and introverted at home, spending hours surfing the Net.

After several weeks the attack against her dies down, but then she learns that her friend Marshall is being targeted. The attacks against him become physical and he is assaulted at school. In a confrontation on the school grounds Tamara, another of Avalon's friends, breaks a bully's nose and the small group is called to Administration, to be dealt with by teaching staff. Avalon and Marshall are terrified of discovery. Marshall is frightened of the consequences of being labelled a dobber, and Avalon is worried about her parents' reaction.

Finally the stress breaks Avalon's resolve to keep the secret and she reveals all to her parents. The cyber campaign is exposed and her parents spring into action. Unfortunately it is too late. At the same time Avalon confesses, Marshall has been beaten up on his way home from school. Also broken, he falls into deep despair and ends his own life. The police investigate his suicide. Computers are accessed and charges of cyber stalking are laid against the culprits. The identity of Dragon Girl is finally revealed to Avalon as her own insecure and socially inept friend Sukey.

== Awards ==
- Winner, Western Australian Premier's Book Awards, 2007.
- Notable Book, Children's Book Council of Australia, 2007.
- Winner, West Australian Young Readers' Book Award, 2007.

== Cyber bullying ==
A survey conducted in Australia found that 42 percent of girls aged between 12 and 15 reported being intimidated or denigrated online or via mobile phone messaging. This is one of the negative sides of modern technology like the Internet. The author's novel Destroying Avalon focuses on the new and destructive phenomenon of cyber bullying.

Cyberbullying affects individuals continuously, as digital connectivity extends past traditional environments. Unlike traditional bullying, which typically concludes at the end of the school day, online harassment can occur at any time, including at home, during evenings, and on weekends. A primary factor in the prevalence of cyberbullying is the central role technology plays in teenage socialization; turning off devices or disconnecting can result in exclusion from peer groups.

Another characteristic of this form of bullying is the anonymity it provides. It allows kids who probably would not engage openly in such behaviour an opportunity to hide behind the faceless nature of the internet and torment others. These are the sort of kids who probably would not bully face to face because they would not like to see the pain on the victim's face, or because they do not want to get caught. Cyber bullying – particularly in chat rooms – takes on a Lord of the Flies mentality: it whips the kids into frenzy. They find themselves sucked in because everyone else is doing it and no one knows who they are!

The act of cyber bullying can be punishable by law, as it's always evolving to incorporate cyber crime. But this can be hard as victims of bullying, traditional-style and cyber, often suffer in silence. Fear of further reprisal and lack of faith in any form of justice or help keeps their mouths shut. Their secrecy, in turn, allows bullies to continue.

== Cyber bullying in this novel ==
In the novel, Avalon becomes the target of a campaign of cyber harassment. Throughout the novel, Avalon experiences many of the forms of cyber bullying outlined in Campbell (2005) "Cyber Bullying: An Old Problem in a New Guise?" Australian Journal of Guidance & Counseling, 15(1). 68-73.

The bullying is relentless, continuing into the night and on weekends. Avalon also has to deal with the publicity around her abuse as students in the school publicly mock her.

== McCaffrey's inspiration ==
Before McCaffrey became a full-time writer she was a high school teacher. The last school she worked in was a technology school, and it was at this school she saw the beginnings of cyber bullying. Kids were using email and internet accounts to sledge other kids. Teachers had to attend IT sessions to help 'catch up' with the students' advanced computer knowledge.

According to McCaffrey, "one day, when I was working on a different novel, I saw a talk show with a young American girl telling the host about the ordeal she'd just endured at her school. She spoke about the kids creating blog sites to spread rumours about her, the constant threatening emails and text messages, how there was no escape from it... I put aside my current work and quickly penned the outline of Destroying Avalon."

She has also written that, "My initial purpose of Destroying Avalon was to raise awareness. It was to create a book that made people shake their heads in disbelief and say "Is that really happening?" I wanted teachers, parents, and decision makers to see how serious the situation is and say "What can we do it about it?" I wanted education programs in place, measures taken to reduce the 'anonymity' the internet provides by preventing access to sites with only a web-based email account. I wanted accountability. I wanted parents to put in place tighter restrictions on their kids' mobile phone access, I wanted to draw attention to it and work towards a solution. Because at the moment there isn't one, this thing has the potential to explode."

== Suitability for study in schools ==
The novel follows 14-year-old Avalon Maloney as she navigates the shift from her small town home of Grace Point and its small country school to an "enormous metropolitan high school". An important part of reading any text is being able to relate to the characters, especially the protagonist whose journey is followed throughout the narrative. The central character is likable and her humour and wit should appeal to the students. Moreover, the fact that she is of a similar age, and has to go through something that all students have experienced, being the new kid, will allow student to empathise with Avalon.

Avalon is a well-rounded character and different elements of her circumstance will marry up with the students in this class. She is sporty, "the captain of the hockey team and member of the swimming squad," but also academic, doing well at school with plans to leave town to attend university. Students will relate to descriptions of the school, the town and its people featured throughout the book.

This text deals with issues of identity, belonging, isolation, peer pressure and sexuality as well as the major issue of cyber bullying. Cyber bullying is an issue which significantly affects adolescents as De Jong notes, explaining "students who are in the middle grades of their schooling − namely Years 6–10 − have a range of personal, intellectual and social needs" and are increasingly vulnerable during this stage of life. He adds that, "developing a healthy self-esteem is probably the most important life task facing young adolescents [and] they can be susceptible to feelings of anxiety, insecurity and poor self-worth" (De Jong, 205). Thus the issues of social acceptance and alienation encountered in this novel and how different characters deal with the pressure imposed by their peers is beneficial to the students of that century zr25.

Throughout the novel, Avalon experiences many forms of cyber bullying, including harassing text messages which are relentless, continuing into the night and on weekends. She also has to deal with the publicity around her abuse as students in the school publicly mock her. It shows how she tries to cope with the bullying and eventually learns not to care what others say about her. However, another boy in the school is not so lucky. He had already been grappling with issues of identity, belonging and sexuality before becoming the next target of the cyber bullies. His suicide part way through the novel is confronting and indicates the severe consequences which can stem from cyber bullying.
