= Chris Mansell =

Australian poet and publisher (born 1953)

- Born: 1953 (age 72–73); Sydney, Australia
- Citizenship: Australia
- Education: University of Sydney
- Occupations: Poet, publisher
- Website: www.chrismansell.com

Chris Mansell (born 1953) is an Australian poet and publisher.

Born in Sydney, Chris Mansell grew up on the Central Coast of New South Wales and in Lae, Papua New Guinea, later studying economics at the University of Sydney. She was active in Sydney in the 1970s and 1980s as an editor and poet and since the 1980s has lived on the south coast of NSW, Australia where she continues to write, perform, publish and edit. In 1978, she and Dane Thwaites began a magazine called Compass Poetry & Prose which published many of the young Australian poets of the time. She closed the magazine in 1987 and soon after, was a member of the collective (which included David Reiter among others) who founded Five Islands Press. She now runs PressPress, a small independent poetry press she founded in 2002.

Like many poets of her generation, Mansell has made her living by performing her work, publishing and teaching writing at various institutions. Primarily a poet, she has also written a number of plays including Some Sunny Day. Her collection Mortifications & Lies has been described as a 'groundbreaking work' because of its experimentation with form and its overtly political content. Love Poems is less political, a livre composé which takes subtler formal risks. Spine Lingo: new and selected poems appeared with Kardoorair in 2011. Always interested in experimentation with form, she now also works in digital media and artist editions which are experimental in physical form as well as content. On this front, her newest works (Stung and Stung More) comprise poems in the 'quad' form which combines strict restrictions with uninhibited content. The quads definitive collection is in 101 Quads. She directed the Shoalhaven Poetry Festival in 2002, 2003 and 2005.

She was a winner of the Queensland Premier's Literary Award (poetry) and has been shortlisted for the NSW Premier's Literature Award, and the Banjo Award (Victoria). She won the Meanjin Dorothy Porter Poetry Prize in 2014.

== Works ==
Poetry

- Head, Heart & Stone (Fling Publishers, Melbourne, 1982)
- Redshift/Blueshift (Five Islands Press, Wollongong, 1988)
- Raptors Blue (Audio, with music by Rob Cousins) (Well Sprung Productions, Sydney, 1989)
- Shining Like a Jinx (Amelia, California, USA, 1992)
- Day Easy Sunlight Fine in Hot Collation (Penguin, Melbourne, 1995) ISBN 978-0-14-024540-0
- Stalking the Rainbow (PressPress, 2002)
- Fickle Brat (IP Digital, Brisbane, 2002)
- Mortifications & Lies (Kardoorair Press, Armidale, 2005) ISBN 0-908244-60-6
- Love poems (Kardoorair Press, Armidale, 2006) ISBN 978-0-14-024540-0
- Letters (Kardoorair Press, Armidale, 2009)
- The view from a beach (PressPress, 2010) ISBN 978-0-9807718-6-2
- Spine Lingo: new and selected poems (Kardoorair Press, Armidale, 2011) ISBN 978-0-908244-83-6
- Love Cuts with Richard Tipping (Well Sprung Productions, 2013) ISBN 9780980771886
- Seven Stations(Well Sprung Productions, 2013) ISBN 9780987305732 and as CD with Andrew Batt-Rawden (composer)(Hospital Hill, 2013)
- 101 Quads (Puncher & Wattmann/Thorny Devil Press, 2020) ISBN 978-0-9807718-6-2
- artist books including Aves, the quiet book, Stung and Stung More.

Fiction

- Schadenvale Road (Interactive Press, Brisbane, 2011) ISBN 9781925780451

Children's book

- Little Wombat (New Holland, Sydney, 1996)
