= The Hunt and Other Poems =

1998 Australian poetry collection by John Kinsella

- Author: John Kinsella
- Language: English
- Genre: Poetry collection
- Publisher: Fremantle Arts Centre Press
- Publication date: 1998
- Publication place: Australia
- Media type: Print
- Pages: 88 pp
- Awards: 1998 Dinny O'Hearn Poetry Prize, winner; 1998 Western Australian Premier's Book Awards — Poetry, joint winner
- ISBN: 1863682112

The Hunt and Other Poems is a collection of poems by Australian poet John Kinsella, published by Fremantle Arts Centre Press in 1998.

The collection contains 60 poems from a variety of sources. The volume is also known by the alternative title of The Hunt : Poems.

The book was winner of the Dinny O'Hearn Poetry Prize in 1998, and joint winner of the 1998 Western Australian Premier's Book Awards for Poetry.

== Contents ==
- "The Well"
- "Wild Radishes"
- "The Tower"
- "Drowning in Wheat"
- "The Fruits of the Auger"
- "Superphosphate"
- "Hessian"
- "Dogs"
- "Death of a Roo Dog"
- "Emu Hunt"
- "Echidna (for Jacques Derrida)"
- "The Disappearing"
- "Dam and Globe of Death"
- "Fences"
- "A Black Moon"
- "A Lynching Under the Southern Cross"
- "The Hunt"
- "Death of an Infant"
- "A Tale from Sand-Plain Country"
- "The Hastings Fence-Post Digger"
- "The Publican"
- Relics, poetry sequence
  - "The Anthropologist"
  - "Rock Paintings"
- "Ne Plus Ultra"
- "Reticulating the Avocados"
- "The Faulty Bolt Action"
- "Jackknife"
- "Ultralight P(r)oem"
- The A-Type Wheat Bin, poetry sequence
  - "The A-Type Wheat Bin : Dreadnought"
  - "The A-Type Wheat Bin : Fumigation"
  - "The A-Type Wheat Bin : Roof Space"
  - "The A-Type Wheat Bin : Sampling Hut"
  - "The A-Type Wheat Bin : Weighbridge"
  - "The A-Type Wheat Bin : Grid"
  - "The A-Type Wheat Bin : Stack"
  - "The A-Type Wheat Bin : View From the Tower"
  - "The A-Type Wheat Bin : Quarters"
- "Wrapping the Hay"
- "On the Random Distribution of King Parrots (for Harold Bloom)"
- "An Aerial View of Wheatlands in Mid Autumn"
- "Firebreak"
- "Corrugations (for Paul Kane)"
- "Mementoes"
- "The Journey"
- "The Whistle"
- "The Trap"
- "Paddy Melons"
- "Pig Melons"
- "Courtship and Country Towns"
- "Waterbag"
- "Death of a Farm Boy"
- "The Widower's Daughter"
- "Hammock"
- "The Rearing Tractor"
- "The Fall"
- "Warren"
- "The Rabbiters: A Pastoral"
- "Mange"
- "The Machine of the Twentieth Century Rolls Through the High-Yielding Crop"
- "Dematerialising the Poisoned Pastoral"

== Critical reception ==
In a short review of the collecton for The Age newspaper after its win in The Age Book of the Year Awards, a reviewer noted that this "is a book of memorable language, especially when Kinsella works vernacular narratives against classic forms (his sestinas and terz rima, for example). He tells the tallest stories and renders local history, and what one's happy to accept as his particular Australian landscape."

== Awards ==
- 1998 Dinny O'Hearn Poetry Prize, winner
- 1998 Western Australian Premier's Book Awards for Poetry, joint winner

== See also ==
- 1998 in Australian literature
