= Dennis Haskell =

Australian poet, critic and academic (born 1948)

- Born: Dennis Haskell; 1948 (age 77–78); Sydney, New South Wales, Australia
- Education: PhD in English Literature, University of Sydney
- Occupation: Emeritus Professor/Senior Honorary Research Fellow
- Writing career
- Years active: 1977-
- Notable awards: ASAL (Association for the Study of Australian Literature): A.A. Phillips Award, 2011

Dennis Haskell is an Australian poet, critic and academic.

== Life and work ==
Haskell was born in Sydney, New South Wales, and studied for a Bachelor of Commerce degree at the University of NSW before completing a PhD in literature at the University of Sydney.

Haskell began teaching English in 1973 in Sydney before moving to Perth in 1984. He was later Emeritus Professor/Senior Honorary Research Fellow in the School of English and Cultural Studies at the University of Western Australia (UWA).

Haskell co-edited the literary magazine Westerly from 1985 to 2009, and was later (and as of 2020) director of the Westerly Centre at UWA. He was chair of the Australia Council's Literature Board from 2009 to 2011.

Apart from writing his own poetry, Haskell has produced a number of critical studies of the works of Australian poets such as Bruce Dawe and Kenneth Slessor.

In 2011 Haskell was awarded the ASAL (Association for the Study of Australian Literature): A.A. Phillips Award for his "long period of excellence in the editing of Westerly".

== Awards ==
- 2003: shortlisted, New South Wales Premier's Literary Awards — Gleebooks Prize for Critical Writing, for Attuned to Alien Moonlight: The Poetry of Bruce Dawe
- 2006: winner, Western Australian Premier's Book Awards — Poetry for All the Time in the World
- 2017: longlisted, ALS Gold Medal for Ahead of Us

== Bibliography ==
=== Poetry collections ===
- Listening at Night (1984) ISBN 0207149399
- A Touch of Ginger with Fay Zwicky (1992) ISBN 064609503X
- Abracadabra (1993) ISBN 186368039X
- The Ghost Names Sing: Poems (1997) ISBN 186368199X
- All the Time in the World (2006) ISBN 1844712532
- Acts of Defiance: New and Selected Poems (2010) ISBN 9781844715275
- Poetry D'Amour 2013: Love Poetry for Valentine's Day (2013) ISBN 9780987363312
- What are We Doing Here? : Selected Poems ISBN 9789715427685
- Ahead of Us (2016) ISBN 9781925163285
- And Yet... (2020) ISBN 9780648685029

=== Critical studies ===
- Kenneth Slessor: Poetry, Essays, War Despatches, War Diaries, Journalism, Autobiographical Material and Letters (1991)
- Kenneth Slessor: Collected Poems edited with Geoffrey Dutton (1994)
- Attuned to Alien Moonlight: The Poetry of Bruce Dawe (2002)

=== Edited ===
- Wordhord: A Critical Selection of Contemporary Western Australian Poetry edited with Hilary Fraser (1989)
- Whose Place?: A Study of Sally Morgan's 'My Place' edited with Delys Bird (1992)
- Myths, Heroes and Anti-Heroes: Essays on the Literature and Culture of the Asia-Pacific Region edited with Bruce Bennett (1992)
- Westerly Looks to Asia: A Selection from Westerly 1956-1992 with Bruce Bennett, Susan Miller, and, Peter Cowan (1993)
- Tilting at Matilda: Literature, Aborigines, Women and the Church in Contemporary Australia (1994)
- Sightings: poems for International PEN 62nd World Congress edited with John Kinsella (1995)
- Interactions: Essays on the Literature and Culture of the Asia-Pacific Region edited with Ron Shapiro (2000)
- Beyond Good And Evil? Essays on the Literature and Culture of the Asia-Pacific Region edited with Megan McKinlay and Pamina Rich (2005)
- Poems 2013: Volume of the Australian Poetry Members Anthology edited with Jessica Friedman and Chris Wallace-Crabb
