= John Mateer (disambiguation) =

John Mateer (born 2004) is an American football player for the University of Oklahoma.

John Mateer may also refer to:

- John Mateer (poet) (born 1971), Australian poet
- John Mateer (musician), American musician and filmmaker
