= Westerly (magazine) =

Australian literary magazine

- The cover of issue 42.2, published in 1997
- Categories: Literature, culture
- Frequency: Biannual
- Format: Online; print
- Publisher: Westerly Centre
- Founded: 1956; 70 years ago
- Based in: Crawley, Western Australia
- Website: westerlymag.com.au

Westerly is a literary magazine that has been produced at the University of Western Australia since 1956. In June 2026, the magazine moved to a publishing schedule of two issues each year, while the website has continual updates.

== History ==
Westerly was launched at the University of Western Australia in 1956.

From November 2000, Salt Magazine, which had been founded in 1990 by Western Australian poet John Kinsella and later renamed Salt: An International Journal of Poetry and Poetics, was published in affiliation with Westerly. Salt was published in the first half of the year, covering European and American literature, while Westerly, published each November, covered Asian and Australian literature. Salt ceased publication around 2003.

In 2015, Westerly ran a campaign called Word Matters, a response in publication to the funding cuts seen in the arts in federal and state budgets. The campaign published poetry from two young emerging poets, and sought reader engagement in the tweeting of responses online (#westerlywordmatters). Around that time, Westerly developed a more extensive online presence with a new website and social media engagement. The magazine, with the redesign of their website, broadened their publications to include special issues and regular online pieces.

In early 2016, the magazine ran a crowdfunding campaign, exceeding their target funding. Funding has also been received from the Copyright Agency Ltd to support a writers development program, which runs annually.

In 2016, Westerly released its first online special issues.

== Description and people ==
The magazine maintains a specific focus on the Australian and Asian regions, but has published literary and cultural content from international authors. It publishes fiction, poetry, cultural, autobiographic, and scholarly essays, and interviews. The print magazine is published twice a year in July and November, with content published on the website on an ongoing basis.

It is based at the Westerly Centre at the University of Western Australia in Crawley, Western Australia.

As of June 2026, editor of Westerly is Daniel Juckes. The Westerly archives are housed in special collections in the University of Western Australia Library, with a complete digital version of the backset available at the website.

== Notable contributors ==
Notable Westerly writers include Randolph Stow, Dorothy Hewett, T.A.G. Hungerford, and Elizabeth Jolley; contemporary writers, including Tim Winton, Kim Scott, and Sally Morgan; and local poets John Kinsella, Tracy Ryan, John Mateer, and Lucy Dougan. It has a remit to focus on Western Australian writing, with other interests including the Asia region and Australian literature more generally.

The Patricia Hackett prize has been awarded by the University of Western Australia for the best original contribution to Westerly each year since 1965.

== See also ==
- List of literary magazines
