= The Fur =

2004 novel by Nathan Hobby

- Cover of First Edition (Softcover)
- Author: Nathan Hobby
- Cover artist: Adrienne Zuvela
- Language: English
- Genre: Science fiction novel
- Publisher: Fremantle Arts Centre Press
- Publication date: 2004
- Publication place: Australia
- Media type: Print (Paperback)
- Pages: 283
- ISBN: 1-920731-01-6
- OCLC: 62541120
- Dewey Decimal: A823.4 21
- LC Class: PR9619.4.H63 F87 2004

The Fur (softcover ISBN 1-920731-01-6) is a science fiction novel by author Nathan Hobby, published in 2004 after winning the 2002 T. A. G. Hungerford Award for unpublished new writers.

== Plot summary ==
The Fur follows the late high school and early university years of the protagonist Michael Sullivan in an Alternate Reality version of Western Australia in the late 1990s. Following a meteor strike in the 1970's carrying an infectious and lethal fungus-like plague ('The Fur'). The entire state has been under forced quarantine by Commonwealth and UN military forces for 30 years.

The novel revolves largely around Sullivan's struggles with his religious beliefs and dilemma on whether or not to attempt to break quarantine and start a new life in the uninfected Eastern States of Australia, at the risk of death and certain cost of abandoning his family and friends forever.

== Reception ==
The journal Reading Time in their review said "this is an uneven, but always interesting novel, one that will appeal to young boys who are feeling their way into adolescense, into deeper relationships with others, and into the questions of idealism, faith and decision making".
