= James Roy (writer) =

Australian writer

- Born: 1968 Trundle, New South Wales, Australia
- Occupation: Writer
- Genre: Young adult fiction Children's literature
- Notable works: Town; Almost Wednesday; Billy Mack's War
- Notable awards: Ethel Turner Prize (2008); Golden Inky Award (2008)

James Roy (born in Trundle, New South Wales, 1968) is an Australian writer. He writes primarily for young adults and children, and in addition to his native Australia, his books are published in the United States, the United Kingdom, Ireland, France, Germany and South Korea.

Roy's parents were Seventh-day Adventist missionaries to Papua New Guinea and Fiji. Roy has often said that growing up in such an environment was key to his development as a writer.

His first novel, Almost Wednesday, was published by University of Queensland Press in 1996, and since that time he has released more than 30 books, ranging from novels and short story collections to chapter books for older readers.

Roy is a visitor to schools and festivals throughout Australia, where he conducts author talks and creative writing workshops across a wide range of audiences.

He lives in the Blue Mountains with his wife and two daughters.

== Books ==
- One Thousand Hills (2016)
- City (2012)
- Miss Understood (2012)
- Edsel Grizzler: Ghostly Shadows (2011)
- Edsel Grizzler: Rescue Mission (2010)
- Anonymity Jones (2010)
- Edsel Grizzler: Voyage to Verdada (2009)
- Quentaris: The Gimlet Eye (2009)
- Hunting Elephants (2008)
- Queasy Rider (2008)
- Town. Eine Stadt (2007)
- Problem Child (2007) - published in the US as Max Quigley, Technically Not a Bully
- Broken Wings (2006)
- The 'S' Word - a boys' guide to sex, puberty and growing up (2006)
- The Legend of Big Red (2005)
- Billy Mack's War (2004)
- Wrestlefest Fever (2003)
- Ichabod Hart and the Lighthouse Mystery (2003)
- A Boat for Bridget (2001)
- Captain Mack (1999)
- Full Moon Racing (1999)
- Almost Wednesday (1996)

== Awards ==
- In 2011 the German edition of Town, titled "Town; Irgendwo in Australien" (Gerstenberg Verlag) was shortlisted for the prestigious Deutscher Jugendliteraturpreis (German Youth Literature Prize) in the Young Adult category.
- In 2008 Town was awarded the Ethel Turner Prize for Young People's Literature, a category of the New South Wales Premier's Literary Awards.
- In 2008 Town was also short-listed for the Queensland Premier's Awards; and won the Golden Inky, a readers' choice award run by the Victorian Centre for Youth Literature.
- Anonymity Jones was co-winner of the 2010 Western Australian Premier's Book Awards (Young Adult category), alongside "Happy as Larry", by Scot Gardner.
- Two of Roy's books have named as Honour Books in the Children's Book Council of Australia "Children's Book of the Year Awards": Captain Mack, in 2000; and Billy Mack's War, in 2005. Several other of his titles have been named as Notable Books in the same awards.
