= Dianne Wolfer =

Australian children's author (born 1961)

- Born: 1961 (age 64–65)
- Occupation: Writer for children
- Writing career
- Language: English
- Years active: 1991-

Dianne Wolfer (born 1961) is an Australian children's author who lives on the south coast of Western Australia.

== Writing career ==
In 2009 Wolfer published Lighthouse Girl which won the 2010 West Australian Young Readers' Book Award for Picture Books, and was shortlisted for the 2009 New South Wales Premier's History Awards. It is based on the true story of Fay Howe, daughter of the Breaksea Island lighthouse keeper, who relayed messages for the departing ANZAC troops in 1914. Lighthouse Girl was part inspiration for the Royal de Luxe The Giants story at the 2015 Perth International Arts Festival and has been adapted for stage by Black Swan Theatre. In 2018 Black Swan Theatre's production toured regional Western Australia.

Partner title Light Horse Boy won the Children's Book Category of the 2014 Western Australian Premier's Book Awards, was shortlisted and awarded Honour Book for the 2014 Children's Book Council of Australia Awards.

A third title, In the Lamplight was published in 2018 and launched in Western Australia and Harefield, UK.

A fourth title, The Last Light Horse, was published in 2022. This title completes Wolfer's Light series. All four books were illustrated by Western Australian fine artist Brian Simmonds.

Wolfer's first picture book Photographs in the Mud was inspired by a research trip along the Kokoda Track and is used as a reference for international workshops promoting peaceful "Discourse Analysis". It has been published in Japanese. It was illustrated by Brian Harrison-Lever.

Her second picture book Granny Grommet and Me was illustrated by Karen Blair. The book was shortlisted for the 2014 Children's Book Council of Australia Awards. Nanna's Button Tin was published by Walker Books Australia in 2017 and republished by Candlewick Press in 2018; it was illustrated by Heather Potter.

Wolfer completed PhD research at the University of Western Australia in 2017, with a focus on anthropomorphism and Crafting Animal Characters in Australian Children's Literature. Two novels for young adult (YA) readers were created as part of this study; The Shark Caller and The Dog with Seven Names, both published by Penguin Random House. "The Shark Caller" was shortlisted for the 2016 West Australian Young Readers' Book Awards and was a 2017 Children's Book Council of Australia (CBCA) Notable book. 'The Dog with Seven Names' was shortlisted for the 2019 NSW Premier's Literary Awards.

An earlier YA title, Choices, was commended for the Family Therapists Children's Literature Award and is also published in Polish.

From 2006 to 2012 Wolfer was the Western Australian Advisor for the Society of Children's Book Writers and Illustrators (SCBWI).

In 2024 Scout and the Rescue Dogs (illustrated by Tony Flowers) won the Premier's Prize for Children's Book of the Year at the WA Premier's Book Awards.

== Books ==
- Cattle Muster (2025), illustrated by Frané Lessac. Walker Books Australia ISBN 978-1-76065-733-8
- The Colt from Old Regret (2025), illustrated by Erica Wagner. National Library of Australia ISBN 978-1-922507-68-6
- Soaring with the Sugarbird Lady: The Robin Miller Story (2025). Fremantle Press ISBN 978-1-76099-527-0
- Scout and the Rescue Dogs (2023), illustrated by Tony Flowers. Walker Books Australia ISBN 9781760655860
- Mia (2022) Allen & Unwin ISBN 9781760877026
- Aussie STEM Stars: Skye Blackburn-Lang (2022). Wild Dingo Press ISBN 9781925893694
- The Last Light Horse (2022), illustrated by Brian Simmonds. Fremantle Press
- Aussie STEM Stars: Munjed Al Muderis (2020). Wild Dingo Press ISBN 9781925893373
- Nanna's Button Tin (2018). Candlewick Press ISBN 9780763680961
- The Dog with Seven Names (2018). Penguin Random House ISBN 9780143787457
- In the Lamplight (2018), illustrated by Brian Simmonds. Fremantle Press ISBN 9781925591224
- Nanna's Button Tin (2017), illustrated by Heather Potter. Walker Books Australia
- The Shark Caller (2016). Penguin Random House ISBN 978-0-14-378055-7
- Annie's Snails (2014), illustrated by Gabriel Evans
- Granny Grommet and Me (2013), illustrated by Karen Blair
- Light Horse Boy (2013), illustrated by Brian Simmonds
- Lighthouse Girl (2009), illustrated by Brian Simmonds
- The Kid Whose Mum Kept Possums in Her Bra (2006)
- Photographs in the Mud (2005), illustrated by Brian Harrison-Lever
- Horse Mad (2005), illustrated by Sharon Thompson
- Scuba Kid (2004), illustrated by Margaret Krajnc
- Iron Kid (2003), illustrated by Margaret Krajnc
- Being Billy (2003), illustrated by Meredith Thomas
- Jungle Trek (2003), illustrated by Mark Wilson
- Butterfly Notes (2002), illustrated by Diana Platt
- Choices (2001)
- Border Line (1998)
- Dolphin Song (1995)
