= Fogarty Literary Award =

Australian literary award

The Fogarty Literary Award is an Australian award that was established in December 2018 by Fremantle Press in association with the Fogarty Foundation. It is a biennial award for an unpublished manuscript by a Western Australian writer aged 18 to 35 valued at AU$20,000. In addition, the winning author receives a publishing contract for their manuscript.

== Award winners ==
Year	Title	Author	References
2019	"The History of Mischief"	Rebecca Higgie	
2021	"The Glass House"	Brooke Dunnell	
2023	"The Skeleton House"	Katherine Allum	
2025	"Glimmers in the Sea Glass"	Chuckie Raven	

== Shortlists ==
=== 2019 ===
- "Where the Line Breaks" by Michael Peregrine Burrows
- "The History of Mischief" by Rebecca Higgie
- "The Last Bookstore" by Emma Young

=== 2021 ===
- "The Glass House" by Brooke Dunnell
- "A Horse Held at Gunpoint" by Patrick Marlborough
- "Old Boy" by Georgia Tree

=== 2023 ===
- "The Skeleton House" by Katherine Allum
- "The Anatomy of Witchcraft" by Prema Arasu
- "Jasper Cliff" by Josh Kemp
- "Nock Loose" by Patrick Marlborough
- "A Wreck of Seabirds" by Karleah Olson
- "The Dreamers" by Emily Paull

=== 2025 ===
- "Glimmers in the Sea Glass" by Chuckie Raven
- "Boy Friends" by Seth Malacari
- "Out There, In Here" by Jessica Baker
- "Wreckage" by Serena Moss.
