= David Reiter =

American poet

- Born: 1947 (age 78–79); Cleveland, Ohio, USA
- Education: University of Oregon; University of Alberta; University of Denver
- Occupations: Writer; poet
- Spouses: Carol Geneva Rechard (m. 1969; div. 1980); Cherie Lorraine Dawson (1992– )
- Writing career
- Language: English

David Philip Reiter (born 1947) is a poet and writer of fiction and multimedia based in Brisbane, Australia.

== Biography ==
=== In North America ===
Born in Cleveland, Ohio, in the USA in 1947, he was adopted shortly after birth by Jewish parents Alexander and Freda Reiter, and brought up in a working-class neighbourhood. His adoptive father, a self-employed truck driver, died of a heart attack in 1958, leaving his mother to raise Reiter as an only child. Aged 19, Reiter moved to Oregon, where he completed his BA in the Independent Studies Program at the University of Oregon. He married Carol Geneva Rechard in 1969 and moved to Alberta, Canada, where both attended the University of Alberta. Reiter completed his master's degree in American Literature, writing his thesis on William Faulkner's The Wild Palms owing to his interest in interdisciplinary subjects. He began publishing stories in prestigious journals like The Fiddlehead (University of New Brunswick) and poems in journals like Canadian Literature. His first paid employment was as a technical editor with the Aerospace Engineering Test Establishment in Cold Lake, followed by an appointment as a scientific editor at the Northern Forest Research Centre in Edmonton, Alberta. His interest in environmental matters led him to be a publishing consultant for several Government departments such as Environment Canada.

In 1975, he accepted a position as a lecturer at Cariboo College, a two-year university level institution in the interior of British Columbia, where he taught literature and writing for ten years. During this time, he was President of the College's Faculty Association, and active in the Provincial organisation representing college teaching staff. He also acted as Chief Negotiator for the faculty during several contract rounds. In 1980 he took leave of absence to attend the University of Denver, where he completed his PhD in Creative Writing, with a collection of stories as his dissertation, and American Literature as his literary field of speciality. Shortly after he returned to Cariboo College, he and his wife were divorced. He was invited to run as a candidate for Provincial parliament for the New Democratic Party in 1982 in an election campaign narrowly lost to the incumbent Social Credit Party. Soon after, he and his partner Helen Gilbert moved to Vancouver, where he taught for a year at the British Columbia Institute of Technology then briefly at the University of British Columbia before migrating to Australia in November 1986.

=== In Australia ===
His first job in Australia was as a lecturer in professional writing at the then Canberra College of Advanced Education where he set up one of the country's first electronic editing programs and was founding editor of the literary magazine Redoubt. During that time he was invited to join the Five Islands Press cooperative, which subsequently published his first volume of poetry, The Snow in Us, which focuses on life among the Inuit, in 1989. His second volume, Changing House, was a transitional work, mostly set in Canada, continuing his interest in historical research and mythology. It was published in 1991 by Jacaranda Press, a division of Jacaranda-Wiley.

He married Cherie Lorraine Dawson in 1992 shortly after resigning his position at the University of Canberra and becoming publishing manager for the Board of Senior Secondary School Studies in Brisbane. In 1993 he became publishing manager for the Criminal Justice Commission where he worked for three years. He founded IP (Interactive Publications Pty Ltd) in 1994 in his consultancy work for a number of government departments. Departing from the Criminal Justice Commission in 1996, he changed the primary focus of IP to a literary publishing company, publishing Hemingway in Spain and Selected Poems as its first title after Penguin Books, which had originally offered to publish it, discontinued their poetry publishing program. Several ex-Penguin poets came to IP to be published. Hemingway in Spain was subsequently shortlisted for the John Bray Award at the Adelaide Festival in 1998.

IP has expanded to an international publishing company with four imprints under his direction, and Reiter continues to publish his work under those imprints, especially his transmedia and children's titles. In demand as a speaker and workshop leader, Reiter undertakes national tours and residencies in Australia and overseas. His interest in digital composing and publishing has led him to become regarded as an expert in Australia on the subject, where IP is a market leader in the development and distribution of digital titles. IP has also forged a number of partnerships with overseas companies such as Lightning Source, google.com, apple.com, Createspace, Amazon, OverDrive, gardners.com and kobo.com in promoting its digital program.

Reiter has been a writer-in-residence at the Banff Centre for the Arts, Canada; the Katharine Prichard Centre in Perth; Bundanon in New South Wales, and in Auckland, New Zealand, at the Michael King Writers Centre in 2008. His work has been translated into several languages including French, German, Spanish and Portuguese, and is currently being translated into Chinese.

== Awards and nominations ==
- 1994 Queensland Premier’s Poetry Award, The Cave After Saltwater Tide – Winner
- 2012 Western Australian Premier's Book Awards - Digital Narrative, My Planets Reunion Memoir – winner
- 2013 Canadian Children's Book Centre Best Book for Teens and Kids, Bringing Down the Wall – winner
- 1998 Adelaide Festival Awards for Literature, Hemingway in Spain and Selected Poems – shortlisted
- 2000 Steele Rudd Award, Triangles – shortlisted
- 2011 WA Premier's Award, Nullarbor Song Cycle – Winner
- 2013 ACT Chief Minister's Reading Challenge, Bringing Down the Wall – shortlisted
- 2016 WA Premier's Award, "Timelord Dreaming" – Winner

== Bibliography ==
=== Poetry ===
Collections

- Reiter, David P. (1989). The snow in us. Wollongong: Five Islands Press.
- Hemingway in Spain and Selected Poems.
- The Cave After Saltwater Tide. Penguin. 1994.
- Kiss & Tell. ipoz.biz. 2002.
- Timelord Dreaming. ipoz.biz. 2015.
- Time Lords Remixed. ipoz.biz. 2020.
- 75 for the 75th: a selected 2002-2022. ipoz.biz. 2022.

List of poems

Title	Year	First published	Reprinted/collected
After the world has ended	1996	Reiter, David P. (May 1996). "After the world has ended". Quadrant. 40 (5): 57.	

=== Novels ===
- Liars and Lovers. 2003.
- Primary Instinct. 2008.
- Black Books Publishing. 2018.

=== Short fiction ===
Collections

- Triangles.

=== Anthologies ===
- Reiter, David P., ed. (2007). Rainshadows (multimedia CD anthology).
- Reiter, David P., ed. (2017). Just Off Message (multimedia CD anthology).
- Reiter, David P., ed. (2021). Outer Space, Inner Minds (multimedia CD anthology).

=== Children's books ===
- The Greenhouse Effect. 2007.
- Real Guns (picture book). 2008.
- Global Cooling. 2008.
- Bringing Down the Wall (children's picture book). 2013.
- Tiger Tames the Min Min. Project Earth-mend Series. 2013.
- Tiger Takes the Big Apple. Project Earth-mend Series. 2014.
- DISinformation. Sir Humphrey & Woody Series. 2023.

=== Other ===
- My Planets Reunion Memoir. 2012.

== Filmography ==
- The Gallery (2000)
- Paul & Vincent (2007)
- Hemingway in Spain (2011)
- Nullarbor Song Cycle (2013)
