= David Whish-Wilson =

Australian author (born 1966)

David Whish-Wilson (born 1966) is an Australian author of 12 novels and three non-fiction books.

Whish-Wilson was born in Newcastle, New South Wales but raised in Singapore, Victoria and Western Australia. He left Australia in 1984 to live in Europe, Africa and Asia, where he worked as a barman, actor, streetseller, labourer, exterminator, factory worker, gardener, clerk, travel agent, teacher and drug trial guinea pig.

His first novel in the Frank Swann crime series, Line of Sight (Penguin Australia) was shortlisted for a Ned Kelly Award in 2012, and his novel True West was shortlisted for a Ned Kelly Award for Best Fiction in 2020. He has since written three more in the series – the first three being published in Germany by Suhrkamp Verlag.

Whish-Wilson wrote the Perth book in the NewSouth Books city series, which was shortlisted for a WA Premier's Book Award. He also teaches in the prison system in Perth and previously in Fiji, where he started the country's first prisoner writing program.

He currently lives in Fremantle, Western Australia, where he coordinates the creative writing program at Curtin University.

== Awards and nominations ==
- 2010 Ned Kelly Awards: Shortlisted for Line of Sight
- 2014 Shortlisted WA Premier's Book Awards for Perth
- 2015 Winner Patricia Hackett Prize for Fiction for The Cook
- 2020 Ned Kelly Awards: Shortlisted for True West
- 2022 WA Premiers Book Awards Fellowship: shortlisted
- 2022 ARA Historical Novel Prize: longlisted for The Sawdust House
- 2025 Western Australian Premier’s Book Awards Fiction Book of the Year: shortlisted for Cutler
- 2026 Western Australian Premier’s Book Awards Fiction Book of the Year: winer for O'Keefe

== Works ==
=== Novels ===
- The Summons (2006, Random House)
- Line of Sight (2010, Penguin)
- "In Savage Freedom" in Hard Labour (Crime Factory, 2012)
- Zero at the Bone (2013, Penguin)
- Perth (2013, New South Publishing)
- Old Scores (2016, Fremantle Press)
- The Coves (2018, Fremantle Press)
- True West (2019, Fremantle Press)
- Shore Leave (2020, Fremantle Press)
- The Sawdust House (2022, Fremantle Press)
- I Am Already Dead (2023, Fremantle Press)
- O'Keefe (2025, Fremantle Press)
- Cutler (2026, Fremantle Press)
- Free World (2026, Fremantle Press)

== See also ==
- Peter Whish-Wilson
