= Diane Armstrong =

Australian writer (born 1939)

- Born: Danuta Julia Boguslawski; 1939 (age 85–86); Kraków, Poland
- Occupation: Novelist, biographer, freelance journalist and travel writer
- Notable works: Mosaic
- Spouse: Michael Armstrong
- Children: 2, daughter and son

Website
- www.dianearmstrong.com

Diane Armstrong (born 1939) is an Australian novelist, biographer and freelance journalist and travel writer.

== Early life and move to Australia ==
Armstrong was born Danuta Julia Boguslawski in 1939 in Kraków, Poland, the family moving to Lwów soon after the Nazi invasion. She came to Australia on the SS Derna with her parents in November 1948, clearing customs in Melbourne, before disembarking in Brisbane. Six months later the family moving to Sydney. Her father was a dentist who had to re-qualify before he could practice in Australia.

== Awards and recognition ==
- National Biography Award, shortlisted for Mosaic
- Victorian Premier's Prize for Nonfiction, shortlisted for Mosaic
- New South Wales Premier's Literary Awards, Douglas Stewart Prize for Non-Fiction, shortlisted for The Voyage of Their Lives
- Commonwealth Writers' Prize, Best First Book, South East Asia and South Pacific Region, shortlisted for the Winter Journey, 2006
- Society of Women Writers, New South Wales, SWW Book Awards, winner for Nocturne, 2009

== Works ==
=== Non-fiction ===
- Mosaic: A Chronicle of Five Generations, Random House, Sydney, 1998 ISBN 0091837138; St Martin's Press, New York, 2001 ISBN 0312274556
- The Voyage of Their Lives: The Story of the SS Derna and its Passengers, Flamingo, Sydney, 2001 ISBN 9780732268268

=== Fiction ===
- Nocturne, Fourth Estate, London, 2008 ISBN 9780732284305
- Winter Journey, Fourth Estate, Sydney, London & New York, 2005 ISBN 0732276942
- Empire Day, HarperCollins, Sydney, 2011 ISBN 9780732290900; Fourth Estate, London, 2011 ISBN 9780732290900
- The Collaborator, HarperCollins, Sydney, 2019 ISBN 9781489251664
- Dancing with the Enemy, HarperCollins, Sydney, 2022 ISBN 9781867206545
