= Hope and Greenwood =

English confectionery business

- Trade name: Hope and Greenwood
- Industry: Confectionery
- Founded: 2004; 22 years ago Dulwich, London
- Headquarters: London, England
- Area served: Worldwide, Dulwich, Covent Garden, Tokyo
- Brands: Hope and Greenwood
- Owner: Honeycomb Project Management
- Website: http://www.hopeandgreenwood.co.uk

Hope and Greenwood is a traditional confectionery business based in London, England.

== Origins ==
Hope and Greenwood was founded in 2004 by husband and wife team Kitty Hope and Mark Greenwood.

Owning a sweetshop was said to have been a "childhood dream" of Miss Hope. The Hope and Greenwood brand sells retro sweets, such as lemon sherbets, cola bottles, gobstoppers and flying saucers, with branding inspired by the founders' love of 1950's-style designs, such as The Boy's Own Paper and Laura Ashley floral prints.

== Products ==
=== Retail and Wholesale ===
They have created their own range of sweets, which are then sold directly to the customer in two retail outlets.

Hope and Greenwood's flagship store was opened in Lordship Lane, East Dulwich, London in 2004. The company opened a second UK shop in Covent Garden in 2006, which later won best original store in the 2006 Living London awards. The outlets have won a number of awards and are regularly used for location shoots and filming.

In 2007, the business expanded globally, opening a store in Japan in partnership with PlazaStyle.

Hope and Greenwood sell to major UK Department stores, including Harrods, Selfridges and John Lewis and supermarkets such as Ocado and Waitrose, as well as a large number of independent stores across the UK. Internationally, Hope and Greenwood also export to over 35 countries worldwide.

The business also accepts orders through their website.

=== Home-ware range ===
In 2012, Hope and Greenwood launched range of "Life is Sweet" home-wares, to complement their confectionery range. This included kitchenware - such as utensils, appliances, dishes, and cookware - as well as a range of stationery. They can be found in a variety of retailers across the UK, as well as the aforementioned retail stores.

=== Books ===
Miss Hope is the author of four recipe books:

- Hope, Kitty (2009). Life is Sweet: A Collection of Splendid Old-Fashioned Confectionery. London: Ebury Press. ISBN 978-0091932664.
- Hope, Kitty (2011). Miss Hope's Chocolate Box. London: Ebury Press. ISBN 978-0091940393.
- Hope, Kitty (2012). Miss Hope's Teatime Treats. London: Ebury Press. ISBN 978-0091946654.
- Hope, Kitty (2014). Sweets Made Simple. London: BBC Books. ISBN 978-1849908238.

Miss Hope’s Chocolate Box won Sainsbury’s Book Title of the Month.

== Television appearances ==
Kitty Hope and Mark Greenwood have made regular appearances on television, in such shows as The Alan Titchmarsh Show, The One Show, Heston's Fantastical Food, and are often acknowledged as industry experts. In 2012 the couple appeared in the final of the eighth series of The Apprentice, as consultants for the final task, which centered on creating a luxury brand.

August 2014 saw the pair present Sweets Made Simple, a four-episode series broadcast on BBC 2. The series featured Hope and Greenwood as they moved around the UK demonstrating the process behind a variety of their favourite sweets, as well as behind the scenes information on topics like sourcing the best ingredients and tweaking to suit individual tastes. A fourth recipe book accompanies the series. The series saw viewing figures peak at 1.8 million. Miss Hope described her reaction to the show as "tickled pink".

== Investment and Administration ==
In February 2013 Luke Johnson became an investor and shareholder.

In 2015, it was announced that Hope and Greenwood had entered into administration. In August 2015, it was announced that Honeycomb Project Management had acquired the intellectual property from the administrators in order to keep the brand alive. Since 21 April 2017, the company's Twitter profile has hinted at a relaunch of the brand and its products but, to date, there have been no further developments.
