= Tracy Ryan (writer) =

Australian poet and novelist

- Born: 1964 (age 61–62); Western Australia
- Occupations: Poet and novelist
- Writing career
- Notable awards: 2011 Western Australian Premier's Book Awards Prize for Poetry, winner

Tracy Ryan (born 1964) is an Australian poet and novelist. She has also worked as an editor, publisher, translator, and academic.

== Life ==
Tracy Ryan was born in Western Australia, where she grew up as part of a large family. She graduated with a Bachelor of Arts in Literature from Curtin University and studied European languages at the University of Western Australia; her PhD (2013) was also from that university.

She has lived in Cambridge, England, where she worked as a bookseller, tutor, editor, and writer. She was Judith E. Wilson Junior Visiting Fellow at Robinson College, Cambridge in 1998. She taught Australian Literature and Film at the University of East Anglia. She has also lived in Ohio in the USA.

She is married to poet John Kinsella and has two children.

== Literary career ==
Tracy Ryan has published over fifteen books, including five novels. Her poetry has appeared in several magazines, such as Salt, Literary Review, and Cordite. She has also appeared in anthologies. Ryan has translated several French writers, including Hélène Cixous, Maryline Desbiolles, and Francoise Han.

In the 1990s, Ryan, with Australian poet John Kinsella, developed Folio(Salt), an offshoot of Salt Magazine.

Reviewer Tim Allen, reviewing the anthology Foil, wrote of her poetry as follows: "Tracy Ryan's poems are tightly packed vibrations of spiky conceits. They have a restless intelligence which seems to suspect everything they touch; the references are scholarly and the contention is feminist but the result is polychromatic."

The John Kinsella and Tracy Ryan Poetry Prize was established in 2005 and is open to members of the University of Cambridge. The award is for an original verse composition in any form, of 500 lines or less.

== Themes and inspiration ==
Ryan's poetry has been compared, by poet Dorothy Hewett, with Sylvia Plath, and Debra Zott, in her review of Hothouse, agrees, saying that "certainly, there are [in Ryan's poetry] the mythic underpinnings one finds in Plath's poetry, as well as that quality of imbuing the personal with highly dramatised mythic proportions" and that "it is no secret that Ryan has been influenced by Plath". However, she argues that "the very mention of Plath's name shapes, and threatens to place limits on, the reader's experience of Ryan's poetry", that "Tracy Ryan's poetry does not need the Plath myth to prop it up".

In 2001, Ryan said the following about her writing:

I don't adhere to any particular school of thought, except in the broadest sense that my writing is inextricably bound up with my feminism. This would be the only real connector between my books. I am interested in trying to find ways in which language may be interrupted, disrupted and rejigged for feminist purposes (among others). Usually this attempt would arise from something in either my personal life or the world around me. My home state is currently enacting a legal clamp-down on women, with regard to street prostitution—passing laws that restrict women's movements and rights to occupy space. Though such factors are often what 'provokes' me into a poem, the poem equally draws life off other books (like most poets, I spend a lot of time reading). I work by a kind of principle of immersion in particular poets at particular times.

== Awards and nominations ==
- 1987 Mattara Poetry Prize, Winner
- 1994 Western Australian Premier's Book Awards Prize for Poetry: Shortlisted for Killing Delilah
- 1995 T. A. G. Hungerford Award for Fiction: Shortlisted for Vamp
- 1996 John Bray Poetry Award, Adelaide Festival: Shortlisted for Killing Delilah
- 1996 Times Literary Supplement: Poems on the Underground short poem competition: Joint winner
- 1997 National Book Council Banjo Award, Commended
- 1998 Western Australian Premier’s Book Award, Shortlisted for Bluebeard in Drag
- 2000 Western Australian Premier's Book Awards Prize for Poetry: Winner for The Willing Eye
- 2007 Trudie Graham Award for Memoir, Winner
- 2008 The Age Book of the Year Award (poetry), Shortlisted for Scar Revision
- 2009 Australian Book Review Poetry Prize, Winner
- 2011 Western Australian Premier's Book Awards Prize for Poetry: Winner for The Argument
- 2023 Western Australian Writer's Fellowship

== Works ==
=== Poetry ===
- Killing Delilah (1994, Fremantle Arts Centre Press) ISBN 1863680683
- Intensities of Blue (1995, Folio, with John Kinsella) ISBN 0646270648
- Bluebeard in Drag (1996, Fremantle Arts Centre Press) ISBN 1863681345
- Slant (1997, rempress) ISBN 1901361039
- Lines of Sight (1997, Folio, with John Kinsella) ISBN 1901994007
- The Willing Eye (1999, Fremantle Arts Centre Press) ISBN 1863682392
- ex opere operato (2000, vagabond)
- Hothouse (2002, Fremantle Arts Centre Press) ISBN 1863683518
- Conspiracies (2003, Salt, with John Kinsella) ISBN 1844710181
- bloc notes (2007, equipage)
- Scar Revision (2008, Fremantle Press) ISBN 9789213610671
- The Argument (2011, Fremantle Press) ISBN 9781921361807
- Unearthed (2013, Fremantle Press) ISBN 1921888636
- The Water Bearer (2018, Fremantle Press) ISBN 9781925164961
- Rose Interior (2022, Giramondo) ISBN 9781925818963

=== Novels ===
- Vamp (1997, Fremantle Arts Centre Press) ISBN 1863681728
- Jazz Tango (2002, Fremantle Arts Centre Press) ISBN 1863683615
- Sweet (2008, Fremantle Press) ISBN 9781921361302
- Claustrophobia (2014, Transit Lounge) ISBN 9781921924729
- We Are Not Most People (2018, Transit Lounge) ISBN 9781925760040
- The Queen's Apprenticeship (2023, Transit Lounge) ISBN 9781923023031
- The War Within Me (2025, Transit Lounge) ISBN 9781923023390

=== Edited ===
- Fremantle Poets 1: New Poets (2010, Fremantle Press) ISBN 9781921361814

=== Plays ===
- Smith Street (Between Heaven and Hell) (2001, three-act play, produced at University of Western Australia, with John Kinsella)

== Sources ==
- Hull, Coral (1998) "Australian Poets at Work Series 1: Tracy Ryan" in Thylazine: The Australian Journal of Arts, Ethics & Literature, No. 3 Accessed: 14 May 2008
- Geoff Page reviews Scar Revision by Tracy Ryan, on The Book Show, ABC-Radio National, 11 February 2008 Accessed: 14 May 2008
- Tracy Ryan: Author Accessed: 14 May 2008
- Tracy Ryan Manuscripts at the University of Western Australia Accessed: 14 May 2008
- Fremantle Press : Books : Unearthed by Tracy Ryan Accessed: 8 September 2013
