= Simone Lazaroo =

Australian author

Simone Lazaroo is an Australian author. Born in Singapore, she migrated with her family to Western Australia as a young child. Her background is Eurasian. She lives in Fremantle, Western Australia and teaches Creative Writing at Murdoch University.

Lazaroo's first novel The World Waiting to be Made won the TAG Hungerford award and was published in 1994. She has won the Western Australian Premier's Book Awards for fiction for three of her published novels, and has been shortlisted for national and international awards. The World Waiting to be Made was inspired by Lazaroo's own experiences and is about a woman who is searching for belonging in Australia, Singapore, and Malacca. It has been translated into French and Mandarin.

Lazaroo's narrative themes often address issues of racial identity and cultural heritage, belonging and dislocation. Her work has been widely studied by literary scholars, particularly those interested in Asian Australian writing.

She was an Erasmus Mundus scholar at the University of Oviedo (Spain) in 2014, and a David TK Wong Writing Fellow at the University of East Anglia (UK) in 2000.

In 2000, her first novel World Waiting To Be Made was shortlisted for the Kiriyama Prize. Lazaroo has also been a regional judge for the Commonwealth Writers' Prize in 2004.

== Bibliography ==
- World Waiting To Be Made (1994)
- The Australian Fiance (2000)
- The Travel Writer (2006)
- Sustenance (2010)
- Lost River: Four Albums (2014)
- ‘Between Water and the Night Sky’ (2023)
