= Quasimodo (magazine) =

Australian student newspaper (1998–2007)

- Type: Student newspaper
- Format: Magazine
- Owner: Fremantle Student Association
- Founded: 1998
- Ceased publication: 2007 (intermittent revivals since)
- Political alignment: Conservative
- Language: English
- Website: Fremantle SA publications (archived)

Quasimodo was a student newspaper published by the Fremantle Student Association at the University of Notre Dame Australia in Fremantle. The magazine takes its name from Quasimodo, Victor Hugo's fictional bell-ringer and protagonist of The Hunchback of Notre-Dame.

== History ==
Quasimodo was preceded by The Ru'bric, which ran in 1996 and 1997. Quasimodo published its first issue in summer 1998.

In 2005, former Quasimodo editor Chris Bailey charged that the university's Catholic hierarchy sought to restrict the range of topics discussed in the magazine, claiming that he and other contributors were "unofficially told by university staff that students involved in defying the university may be kicked out of uni." Upcoming issues were vetted by a review committee of university and student representatives – "Quasimodo now is very much G-rated" as a result, Bailey claimed. One Quasimodo issue, containing an article on the morning-after pill, was banned by vice-chancellor Peter Tannock.

Quasimodo ceased publication in 2007, and numerous revivals have since been attempted.
