= Sally Murphy =

Australian children's author and poet (born 1968)

Sally Murphy OAM
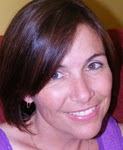
- Born: Perth, Western Australia, Australia
- Occupation: Author
- Writing career
- Genre: Children's literature
- Website: sallymurphy.com.au

Sally Murphy is an Australian children's author and poet. Her works include verse novels, picture books, and educational titles.

== Early life and education ==
Sally Murphy was born in Perth, Western Australia, the youngest of six children, and grew up in the southwest town of Collie. She started writing stories at a young age, entering local writing competitions throughout her childhood.

After leaving school she completed a Bachelor of Arts degree at the University of Western Australia and a Teaching Diploma at Edith Cowan University.

== Career ==
=== Writing ===
Her first book, a book of printable educational activities, Speak Out, was published by Ready Ed Publications in 1997. Since then she has had many books published, including verse novels Pearl Verses the World (2009) and Toppling (2010), picture books, junior novels, and educational titles.

As of June 2022 she had published over 50 books.

=== Academia ===
Murphy has undertaken research in creative writing; early childhood education; education; English and literacy curriculum and pedagogy; and literary studies.

From 2012 to 2013, she was sessional lecturer and learning advisor at Edith Cowan University.

From 2017 to 2019, she was a sessional lecturer at Curtin University, becoming a lecturer in literacy and early childhood in the School of Education in 2019, and course coordinator in early childhood education in 2020.

== Other activities ==
In 2001, Murphy founded the Aussie Reviews website.

Since 2005 she has been a member of the Australia and New Zealand Society of Children's Book Writers and Illustrators.

== Recognition and awards ==
- 2018: Asialink Arts Residency, Hanoi, Vietnam
- 2019: Creative Time Fellowship, May Gibbs Children's Literature Trust
- 2022: Medal of the Order of Australia (OAM) in the 2022 Queen's Birthday Honours

=== Pearl Verses the World ===
- Winner, Children's Book category, Indie Book Award, 2009
- Winner, Family Therapist Literary Award, 2010
- Winner, Hoffmann Award (for the highest ranked West Australian author), West Australian Young Readers' Book Award, 2010
- Winner, Western Australian Premier's Book Awards (Children's Book Category)
- Shortlisted for the Indie Book of the Year Award, 2009
- Shortlisted for Mary Ryan's Award, Queensland Premier's Literary Awards, 2009
- Shortlisted for Junior Category, Red Dot Book Award 2009-2010 (International School Libraries Network, Singapore)
- Honour Book, Children's Book of the Year Award: Younger Readers, 2010 (called one of "two outstanding verse novels" by the judges)

=== Other book awards ===
- 2010: Winner, Mary Ryan's Award, Queensland Premier's Literary Awards, for Toppling
- 2016: Notable Book, Children's Book of the Year Award: Younger Readers, for Roses are Blue
- 2018: Notable Book, Children's Book of the Year (Younger Readers), for Looking Up
- 2021: Honour Book, Children's Book of the Year Award: Younger Readers

== Selected works ==
=== Verse novels ===
- Pearl Verses the world
- Toppling, illustrated by Rhian Nest James (2010)
- Worse Things

=== Picture books ===
- Snowy’s Christmas, illustrated by David Murphy (2009)
- Pemberthy Bear, illustrated by Jacqui Grantford (2006)
- The Floatingest Frog, illustrated by Simon Bosch (2004)

=== Chapter books ===
- The Big Blowie, illustrated by Craig Longmuir (2008)
- R is for Rolf, illustrated by Trevor Pye (2006)
- Bugged, illustrated by Stephen Axelsen (2006)
- Stuck, illustrated by Stephen Axelsen (2006)
- Doggy Duo, illustrated by Teresa Culkin-Lawrence (2003)

=== Educational titles ===
- Two Tricky Tales
- Marty’s Birthday
- Buzzy Fly
- Be Careful
- Remember Me
- Over the Fence
- Sonoran Desert Animals
- The Extraordinary House
- Icecream
- Who Wants to Be a Millionaire
- Desert critters
- Frogs: Awesome Amphibians
- Aussie Authors
- Aussie Authors 2
- Writing the News
- Speak Out
- Speak Up
- Spellbound
- The Book Book
- Assembly: Poems to perform
