= The Drowner =

Book by Robert Drewe

- First edition
- Author: Robert Drewe
- Language: English
- Genre: novel
- Publisher: Pan Macmillan, Australia
- Publication date: 1996
- Publication place: Australia
- Media type: Print (hardback & paperback)
- Pages: 329
- ISBN: 0732908582
- Preceded by: Our Sunshine
- Followed by: Grace

The Drowner (1996) is a novel by Australian author Robert Drewe.

It was shortlisted for Miles Franklin Award, and won the Vance Palmer Prize for Fiction and New South Wales Premier's Literary Awards — Book of the Year in 1997.

== Plot summary ==
In the late 19th century an Englishman irrigator or "drowner", Will Dance, utilises ancient water-knowledge and modern technology to save a drought-ridden town in Western Australia.

== Reviews ==
- Publishers' Weekly noted: "The desert mining town,..., comes fully to life, invigorated by crisp and moving portrayals of Drewe's minor characters and the monotonous beauty of the hostile (blessedly arid) countryside."
- Garth Crawford in Woroni stated: "In his mastery of image, and spare but beautiful descriptions of this quest, Drewe reveals his strongest claim to pre-eminence. The Drowner is by an author who enjoys words, weighs and places each without mistaking linguistic asceticism for aestheticism."

== Awards and nominations ==
- 1997 winner New South Wales Premier's Literary Awards — Christina Stead Prize for Fiction
- 1997 winner New South Wales Premier's Literary Awards — Book of the Year
- 1997 shortlisted Commonwealth Writer's Prize — South East Asia and South Pacific Region - Best First Novel
- 1997 winner Vance Palmer Prize for Fiction
- 1998 winner Adelaide Festival Awards for Literature
- 1998 winner Adelaide Festival Awards for Literature — Premier's Award for the Best Overall Published Work

== Notes ==
A film adaptation of the novel was reportedly arranging funding in 2010, and was in pre-production in 2013. It was to be directed by Jeff Darling from a screenplay by Justin Monjo, and produced by Michael Boughen and Matthew Street and production company Ambience Entertainment.
