= John Mateer (poet) =

Australian poet (born 1971)

- Born: 1971 (age 54–55); John Mateer
- Occupation: Poet
- Writing career
- Notable awards: 2001 Victorian Premier's Literary Awards — Prize for Poetry, winner

John Mateer (born 1971) is a South African-born Australian poet and author.

== Early life and education ==
He was born in Roodepoort, South Africa in 1971, and grew up on the outskirts of Johannesburg. He spent some of his childhood in Canada, before returning to South Africa in 1979. In 1989 he moved to Australia with his family. He attended the International Writing Program at the University of Iowa. Since then, he has lived in Melbourne and Perth.

== Literary career ==
Mateer has published several collections of poems. Barefoot Speech won the 2001 C. J. Dennis Prize for Poetry and Loanwords was shortlisted for the 2002 Western Australian Premier's Book Awards. Unbelievers, or The Moor was shortlisted for the Kenneth Slessor Prize for Poetry, New South Wales Premier's Literary Awards, 2015. He was also a recipient of the Centenary Medal for his contributions to Australian literature.

He has read his work at poetry festivals in Asia and Europe, and most recently in Japan and in Malaysia. His works have been translated into Japanese and Portuguese. Mateer was granted a fellowship to travel to Indonesia, and later published a non-fiction travelogue entitled Semar's Cave: an Indonesian Journal.

== Works ==
=== Poetry collections ===
- Burning Swans (1994)
- Anachronism (1997)
- Echo (1998)
- Spitting Out Seeds (1999)
- Mister! Mister! Mister! (1999)
- Poems (1999)
- Barefoot Speech (2000)
- Loanwords (2002)
- The Brewery Site : Six Poems (2004)
- The Ancient Capital of Images (2005)
- Brian McKay (2005)
- Elsewhere (2007)
- Republic of the East (2008)
- Southern Barbarians (2009)
- Ex-White: South African Poems (2009)
- The West: Australian Poems 1989–2009 (2010)
- Unbelievers, or the Moor (2013)
- João (2018) Giramondo ISBN 978-1-925336-62-7

=== Travel ===
- Semar's Cave: an Indonesian Journal (2004)
