= Scot Gardner =

Australian writer

- Occupation: Writer
- Spouse: Robyn Grant
- Children: Jen, Belle, Bryce
- Writing career
- Language: English
- Notable works: Burning Eddy; The Dead I Know
- Notable awards: WA Premiers Award, CBC Award for Young Adults
- Website: scotgardner.com

Scot Gardner is an Australian writer known for his young adult novels. He has worked as a counselor and youth worker before becoming a full-time novelist.

== Career ==
"I'm not exactly sure how I ended up a writer. I wanted to be a veterinarian when I was at school, but I did work experience as a vet and it was nothing like I'd imagined." - Scot Gardner

== Bibliography ==
- One Dead Seagull (2001)
- White Ute Dreaming (2002)
- Burning Eddy (2003)
- The Legend of Kevin the Plumber (2004)
- Kite Dude (2004)
- Gravity (2006)
- The Other Madonna (2007)
- The Lonely Lady (2023)
- Jacobs Last Walk (2022)
- Fall from the Slippery Cliff (2021)
- The Anti-Biotics Didn't Work (2020)
- Jequis Ain't No Sucker (2001)
- One Wheel Drive (2007)
- The Lost King (2008)
- The Detachable Boy (2008)
- Bookmark Days (2009)
- The Detachable Boy: With One Loose Foot (2010)
- Happy as Larry (2010)
- The Dead I Know (2011)
- The Way We Roll (2016)
- Sparrow (2017)
- Changing Gears (2018)
- Off the Map (2020)

== Critical studies and reviews of Gardner's work ==
- Mansfield, Stephen (September 2011). "Living without remembering". Australian Book Review (334): 66–67. Review of The Dead I Know.
