= Lucy Dougan =

Australian poet

Lucy Dougan (born 1966) is an Australian poet whose first collection was published in 1998.

== Early life and education ==
Dougan was born in Perth, Western Australia in 1966.

In 2009, she completed her PhD thesis at the University of Western Australia in dual format ‘’On the Circumvesuviana’’ (poetry) and ‘’The Vesuvian Imaginary: The Woman's Journey to Naples in Three Texts’’ (dissertation). Her thesis formed the basis of her 2012 publication, On the Circumvesuviana.

== Works ==
=== Poetry ===
- Dougan, Lucy (1998), Memory shell, Five Islands Press Associates, ISBN 978-0-86418-506-8
- — (2008), White clay, Giramondo Publishing Company, ISBN 978-1-920882-32-7
- — (2011), Against Lawns : and other poems, Picaro Press
- — (2012), On the Circumvesuviana, Picaro Press, ISBN 978-1-921691-27-0
- — (2015), The Guardians, Artarmon NSW Giramondo Publishing Company, ISBN 978-1-922146-75-5

=== As editor ===
- Zwicky, Fay (2017), Dougan, Lucy; Dolin, Tom (eds.), The collected poems of Fay Zwicky, UWA Publishing, ISBN 978-1-74258-932-9

== Awards and recognition ==
- Memory Shell won the 2000 Mary Gilmore Award for a First Book of Poetry at the ASAL Awards
- White Clay won the 2006 Alec Bolton Award for an Unpublished Manuscript, ACT Poetry Prize
- The Guardians was shortlisted for the 2015 Judith Wright Calanthe Award
- The Guardians was shortlisted for the 2016 Victorian Premier's Awards: Prize for Poetry
- The Guardians won the 2016 Western Australian Premier’s Book Awards — Poetry
