= John Kinsella (poet) =

Australian poet and novelist

- Born: 1963 (age 62–63); Perth, Western Australia
- Occupations: Poet, novelist, critic, essayist, and editor.
- Writing career
- Notable awards: 2012 Grace Leven Prize for Poetry, co-winner; 2013 Prime Minister's Literary Awards — Poetry, winner

John Vincent Kinsella is an Australian poet, novelist, critic, essayist, and editor. Mainly known for his poetry, his writing is strongly influenced by landscape, and he espouses an "international regionalism" in his approach to place. He has also frequently worked in collaboration with other writers, artists, and musicians. He has also written under the names John Heywood and Ern Malley. Kinsella was a founding editor of the literary journal Salt: An International Journal of Poetry and Poetics in 1990.

== Early life and education ==
John Vincent Kinsella was born in Perth, Western Australia, in 1963. His mother was a poet and he began writing poetry as a child.

He worked in a variety of places, including laboratories, a fertiliser factory, and on farms, before becoming a full-time writer.

== Career ==
=== Overview ===
Kinsella has published around 64 books and is one of Australia's most prolific contemporary poets. He has published some work under the pseudonyms "John Heywood" and "Ern Malley" (the latter referring to the Ern Malley literary hoax). His writing is strongly influenced by landscape, and he espouses an "international regionalism" in his approach to place. He has said that all of his work is placed on a patch of land in the Western Australian wheatbelt. Author David Brooks, wrote in 2022: "If his poetry can be seen and understood as project (as I think it can: I think this is its real achievement), evolving into what he might describe as an ecopoetics, then these wheatbelt meditations are its core. They are an attempt to adjust the mindset and language of more traditional poetry to the needs of the ravaged landscape and the environmental crisis in which we find ourselves".

His awards include three Western Australian Premier's Book Awards, the Grace Leven Prize for Poetry, the John Bray Award for Poetry, the 2008 Christopher Brennan Award, the Victorian Premier's Literary Award for Poetry, the Judith Wright Calanthe Award for poetry (twice) and the Australian Prime Minister's Literary Award for Poetry.

=== Poetry and novels ===
Kinsella published his first collections of poems in the 1980s: The Frozen Sea (1983), under the name John Heywood, and, in 1989, The Book of Two Faces: Poems and The Night Parrots.

His poems have appeared in journals such as Stand, The Times Literary Supplement, The Kenyon Review, Poetry Salzburg Review, The New Yorker, the London Review of Books and Antipodes. His poetry collections include: Poems 1980-1994, The Silo, The Undertow: New & Selected Poems, Visitants (1999), Wheatlands (with Dorothy Hewett, 2000) and The Hierarchy of Sheep (2001). His book, Peripheral Light: New and Selected Poems, includes an introduction by Harold Bloom and his poetry collection, The New Arcadia, was published in June 2005. Drowning in Wheat: Selected Poems appeared in 2016, and Insomnia in 2019. After these came the first two volumes of his collected poems: The Ascension of Sheep (2021) and Harsh Hakea (2022).

Kinsella has published various books of autobiographical writing including Auto (2001) and Displaced: A Rural Life (2020). He has also written plays, short stories and the novels Genre and Post-colonial.

Kinsella's 2010 book, Activist Poetics: Anarchy in the Avon Valley, was published by Liverpool University Press and was edited by Niall Lucy.

=== Editor and critic ===
Kinsella was a founding editor of the literary journal Salt: An International Journal of Poetry and Poetics in 1990, which was published until around 2003, and became the foundation of Salt Publishing in 1999.

He was international editor of The Kenyon Review, an American journal. He co-edited a special issue on Australian poetry for the American journal Poetry and various other issues of international journals. He was a poetry critic for The Observer and is an editorial consultant for Westerly.

He was Cambridge correspondent for the Australian literary magazine Overland, and co-editor of the British literary journal Stand.

He edited the Penguin Anthology of Australian Poetry (2008), and co-edited, with Tracy Ryan, Fremantle Press Anthology of Western Australian Poetry (2017).

His critical works include the poetics of place trilogy, Disclosed Poetics: beyond landscape and lyricism (2007), Polysituatedness (2017) and Beyond Ambiguity (2021). In these he posits his theory of "international regionalism" and "polysituatedness". The recent critical work Legibility: an anti-fascist poetics extends Kinsella's thinking around the intersections of pacifism, protest, human rights, animal rights, environmentalism, anarchism, veganism, and the role of poetry in resisting fascism.

Kinsella is a frequent contributor, of both poetry and criticism, to the Australian newspaper The Saturday Paper.

=== Academia ===
Kinsella was appointed Richard L Thomas Professor of Creative Writing at Kenyon College, United States, in 2001. He also taught at Cambridge University, where he was made a Fellow of Churchill College in 1997.

He has also been adjunct professor of English at Edith Cowan University in Perth.

In 2022 Kinsella was visiting DAAD professor in English at University of Tübingen, Germany.

As of June 2026 he is emeritus professor in the School of Media, Creative Arts and Social Inquiry at Curtin University.

=== Blog ===
Since 2008 and as of 2026 Kinsella co-hosts a blog with Tracy Ryan entitled "Mutually Said: Poets Vegan Anarchist Pacifist", subtitled "A blog shared between poets John Kinsella and Tracy Ryan: vegan, anarchist, pacifist and feminist".

== Manuscript collections ==
Kinsella's manuscripts are housed in the University of Western Australia, the National Library of Australia, the University of New South Wales, Kenyon College, and the University of Leeds. The main collection is in Special Collections in the University of Western Australia Library.

== Awards ==
- 1993: Full Fathom Five, Western Australian Premier's Book Awards — Poetry, winner
- 1996: The Silo: A Pastoral Symphony, Adelaide Festival Awards for Literature, winner
- 1996: The Undertow : New and Selected Poems, Grace Leven Prize for Poetry, winner
- 1998: The Hunt and Other Poems, Western Australian Premier's Book Awards — Poetry, joint winner
- 1998: The Hunt and Other Poems, The Age Book of the Year Award — Dinny O'Hearn Poetry Prize, winner
- 2003: Peripheral Light : New and Selected Poems, Western Australian Premier's Book Awards — Poetry, winner
- 2006: The New Arcadia, Queensland Premier's Literary Awards — Judith Wright Calanthe Prize for Poetry, winner
- 2012: Armour, Victorian Premier's Literary Awards — Prize for Poetry, winner
- 2012: The Jaguar's Dream, Grace Leven Prize for Poetry, joint winner
- 2013: Jam Tree Gully: Poems, Queensland Literary Awards — Judith Wright Calanthe Prize for Poetry, winner
- 2013: Jam Tree Gully: Poems, Prime Minister's Literary Awards — Poetry, winner

== Personal life and views ==
Kinsella has called himself an anarchist since he was a teenager, and is a vegan, pacifist, and environmental activist.

== Bibliography ==
=== Poetry ===
Collections

- The Frozen Sea (as John Heywood, 1983)
- The Book of Two Faces: Poems. 1989.
- Night Parrots. 1989.
- Ultramarine: Poems (1991)
- Eschatologies (1991)
- Poems (1991)
- Full Fathom Five (1993)
- Syzygy (1993)
- The Silo: A Pastoral Symphony: Poems (1995)
- Erratum / Frame(d) (1995)
- Intensities of Blue: Poems (1995)
- The Radnoti Poems (1996)
- Lightning Tree (1996)
- The Undertow: New and Selected Poems (1996)
- Poems, 1980–1994 (1997)
- Lines of Sight (1997)
- The Hunt and Other Poems (1998)
- Pine: Poems (1998)
- Counter-Pastoral (1999)
- Visitants (1999)
- Fenland Pastorals (1999)
- Zone (2000)
- Wheatlands (2000)
- Rivers (2002)
- Peripheral Light: New and Selected Poems (2003)
- Doppler Effect (2004)
- The New Arcadia (2005)
- Love Sonnets (2006)
- America, or Glow: (A Poem) (2006)
- Divine Comedy: Journeys Through Regional Geography (2008)
- Shades of the Sublime and Beautiful (2008)
- Sacre Coeur–A Salt Tragedy (2009)
- Sand with Robert Drewe (2010)
- Armour (2011)
- Synopticon (2012)
- Jam Tree Gully: Poems (2011)
- The Ballad of Moondyne Joe (2012)
- The Jaguar's Dream (2012)
- The Vision of Error: A Sextet of Activist Poems (2013)
- A Remarkable Grey Horse (2014)
- Sack (2014)
- Drowning in Wheat: Selected Poems (2016)
- Graphology Poems 1995-2015 (2016)
- Firebreaks (2016)
- On the Outskirts (2017)
- Renga: 100 Poems (2017)
- Polysituatedness: A Poetics of Displacement (2017)
- The Wound (2018)
- Open Door (2018)
- Insomnia (2019)
- Supervivid Depastoralism (2021)
- Collected Poems, published by UWA Press
  - The Ascension of Sheep (Collected Poems, vol. 1) (2021)
  - Harsh Hakea (Collected Poems, vol. 2) (2022)
  - Spirals (Collected Poems, vol. 3) (2024)
- Ghost of Myself (2025)
- The Darkest Pastoral: Selected Poems by John Kinsella (W. W. Norton, 2025)

Selected list of poems

- "Fall of windchime" (1989)
- "The Fable of the Great Sow" (2012)
- "Hiss" (2014)

=== Novels ===
- Genre (1997)
- Post-colonial (2009)
- Lucida Intervalla (2018)
- Hollow Earth (2019)
- Hotel Impossible (2020)
- Cellnight: a verse novel (2023)
- The Argonautica Inlandica (2023)
- Mahler Erasures (2024)

=== Short fiction ===
Collections

- Kinsella, John (1998). Grappling Eros : fiction.
- Conspiracies (2003)
- In the Shade of the Shady Tree (Ohio University Press, 2012)
- Tide (Transit Lounge, 2013)
- Crow's Breath and Other Stories (Transit Lounge, 2015)
- Old Growth (Transit Lounge, 2017)
- Pushing Back (2021)
- Beam of Light (Transit Lounge, 2024)

=== Plays ===
- Kinsella, John (2003). Divinations : four plays.

=== Non-fiction ===
- Kinsella, John, ed. (1992). The bird catcher's song : a Salt anthology of contemporary poetry.
- —, ed. (1995). Sightings : poems for International PEN 62nd World Congress.
- —, ed. (1999). Landbridge : contemporary Australian poetry.
- —, ed. (2002). The owner of my face : new and selected poems.
- —, ed. (2002). Michael Dransfield : a retrospective.
- —, ed. (2003). Western Australian writing : an online anthology.
- —, ed. (2006). School days.
- —, ed. (2008). Over there : poems from Singapore and Australia.
- — (2008). Contrary rhetoric : lectures on landscape and language.
- —, ed. (2009). The Penguin anthology of Australian poetry.

Autobiography / memoir

- Kinsella, John (2001). Auto.
- — (2006). Fast, Loose Beginnings: A Memoir of Intoxications.
- — (2020). Displaced: A Rural Life.

Essays and reporting

- Kinsella, John (December 2014). "Fall of windchime". From Pen to Paper. The National Library of Australia Magazine. 6 (4): 7.
- "Parrotology: On the Necessity of Parrots in Poetry", Australian Book Review, October 2005.

Miscellaneous

- Kinsella, John; Drewe, Robert (2010), Sand, Fremantle Press
