= Fremantle Press =

Publisher based in Fremantle, Western Australia

- Founded: 1976
- Founder: Fremantle Arts Centre
- Country of origin: Australia
- Headquarters location: Fremantle
- Publication types: Books
- Official website: fremantlepress.com.au

Fremantle Press (formerly known as Fremantle Arts Centre Press) is an independent publisher in Western Australia. Fremantle Press was established by the Fremantle Arts Centre in 1976. It focuses on publishing Western Australian writers and writing.

It publishes works of fiction, literary prose and poetry, social history, autobiography, biography, trade books in areas such as food and photography, children's picture books and fiction for young readers.

== History ==
The Fremantle Arts Centre Press was started in the mid-1970s when it published the first of its books which included a poetry anthology. The first author of a whole book was Elizabeth Jolley who wrote Five Acre Virgin and other Stories which was one her first published works in 1976.

Known initially for fiction works, the press had a substantial financial success with a non-fiction work about an Australian autobiography entitled A Fortunate Life written by an 85-year-old Albert Facey. This work was licensed to Penguin books and sold over 750,000 copies. The arrangement with Penguin grew to a permanent distribution deal with the publication of My Place by the Indigenous author Sally Morgan in 1987. This was a national success and in 2000 when they published Benang, another award-winning novel by the indigenous author Kim Scott.

The press celebrated its first ten years of publishing in 1986. In the 1990s, the press was involved in publishing archival materials.

The press changed its name to Fremantle Press in 2007.

In the late 1970s and early 1980s, the press had a dedicated series edited by William Grono called West Coast Writing – of books of short stories and poetry. It included works by Nicholas Hasluck, Tom Hungerford, Alan Alexander, Andrew Burke, Lee Knowles, Alec Choate, Justina Williams, Peter Cowan, Julie Lewis, and James Legasse.

The press published a poetry anthology of Western Australian works by Ryan and Kinsella in 2017.

Subsequent published authors include Albert Facey, Sally Morgan, Elizabeth Jolley, Tim Winton, Liz Byrski, Julia Lawrinson, Kim Scott, John Kinsella, John A. Long, Tracy Ryan, Richard Woldendorp, Frances Andrijich, Carolyn Polizzotto, Wayne Ashton, Anna Haebich, Philip Salom, Eoin Cameron, Kate Lamont, Kate McCaffrey, Katherine Summers, Simon Haynes, Craig Silvey and Stephen Kinnane.

Since 1988, Fremantle Press has sponsored the TAG Hungerford Award, a biennial award given to an unpublished writer for a work of adult fiction, narrative non-fiction or young adult fiction.

Fremantle Press established the Fogarty Literary Award in association with the Fogarty Foundation in December 2018. This biennial award is for an unpublished manuscript by a Western Australian writer aged 18 to 35 valued at $20,000. In addition, the winning author receives a publishing contract for their manuscript.

In June 2025, Fremantle Press and CircusWA jointly purchased the historic SEC Substation building on Fremantle's Parry Street for use as the home for both organisations.
