= Hazel Rowley Literary Fellowship =

Australian literary award

The Hazel Rowley Literary Fellowship was set up in 2011 in memory of Hazel Rowley by her sister, Della Rowley and friends, in association with Writers Victoria Inc. The Fellowship was originally valued at AU$10,000, but was increased to AU$15,000 in 2017 and then to AU$20,000 in 2022. The Fellowship will conclude after its 15th edition in 2026.

== Winners ==
Year	Author	Project
2012	Mary Hoban	biography of Julia Arnold, published in 2019 as An Unconventional Wife: The life of Julia Sorell Arnold
2013	Stephany Steggall	biography of Thomas Keneally, published in 2015 as Interestingly enough... : The life of Tom Keneally
2014	Maxine Beneba Clarke	memoir, The Hate Race, published in 2016
2015	Caroline Baum	biography of Lucie Dreyfus
2016	Matthew Lamb	biography of Frank Moorhouse, published in 2023 as Frank Moorhouse: Strange Paths
2017	Ann-Marie Priest	biography of Gwen Harwood, published in 2022 as My Tongue Is My Own: a life of Gwen Harwood
2018	Jacqueline Kent	biography of Vida Goldstein, published in 2020 as Vida: A woman for our time
2019	Eleanor Hogan	biography of Ernestine Hill and Daisy Bates, published in 2021 as Into the Loneliness : The unholy alliance of Ernestine Hill and Daisy Bates
2020	Lance Richardson	biography of Peter Matthiessen, published in 2025 as True Nature: The Lives of Peter Matthiessen
2021	Mandy Sayer	biography of Australian silent filmmakers, the McDonagh sisters, published in 2022 as Those Dashing McDonagh Sisters: Australia's First Female Filmmaking Team
2022	Naomi Parry Duncan	biography of Gai-mariagal man, Musquito
2023	Diane Bell	biography of Louisa Karpany and George Mason, ‘The Queen and the Protector’
2024	Kate Fullagar	biography of Marguerite Wolters
2025	Michelle Staff	biography of Bessie Rischbieth and Olive Evans
2026	Jennifer Martin	biography of journalist Eva Sommer

== Shortlists ==
Year	Author	Project
2012	Patrick Allington	
2012	Martin Edmond	
2012	Mary Hoban	
2012	Anne Houen	
2012	Heather Long	
2012	Chris Pash	
2012	Loretta Smith	
2012	Michelle Scott Tucker	
2012	Sally Percival Wood	
2013	Lisa Milner	
2013	John Murphy	
2013	Helen O'Neill	
2013	Sheridan Palmer	
2013	Ann-Marie Priest	
2013	Stephany Steggal	
2013	Elizabeth Taylor	
2014	Maxine Beneba Clarke	autobiography – The Hate Race
2014	Lesley Harding and Kendrah Morgan	John and Sunday Reed – Rebels with a Cause
2014	Rodney James	art critic Alan McCulloch – Letters to a Critic
2014	Sylvia Martin	Amy Witting – The Survivor
2014	Michelle Potter	authorised biography of Margaret Scott
2014	Ruth Starke	politician Don Dunstan – Between the Lines
2014	Warren Ward	the love lives of seven philosophers – Lovers of Philosophy
2014	Nadia Wheatley	A Memoir of Memory
2015	Patrick Allington	Australian writer David Malouf
2015	Caroline Baum	Lucie Dreyfus
2015	Barry Divola	Happy Man – Australian band The Sunnyboys and singer-songwriter Jeremy Oxley
2015	Lyn Gallacher	Discurio record store owners Ruth and Peter Mann
2015	Naomi Parry	Indigenous bushranger Musquito
2015	Ann-Marie Priest	Australian poet Gwen Harwood
2015	Ronnie Scott	Agatha Christie – her journey across three countries
2015	Biff Ward	memoir – Vietnam, Mon Amour
2016	Shannon Burns	Australian writer Gerald Murnane
2016	Philip Dwyer	Napoleon Bonaparte – volume 3
2016	Kitty Hauser	art teacher Geoffrey Bardon
2016	Eleanor Hogan	"Into the Loneliness: The Literary Alliance of Ernestine Hill and Daisy Bates"
2016	Sharon Huebner	Noongar woman Bessy Flowers
2016	Jacqueline Kent	Robert Helpmann
2016	Matthew Lamb	Frank Moorhouse
2016	Alec O'Halloran	Mick Namarari Tjapaltjarri
2016	Jeff Sparrow	African-American singer Paul Robeson
2017	Peter Edwards	Robert Marsden Hope
2017	Thornton McCamish	actor Robert Hughes
2017	Craig Munro	Literary Lions – A. G. Stephens, P. R. 'Inky' Stephensen, Beatrice Davis and Kenneth Slessor
2017	Ann-Marie Priest	poet Gwen Harwood
2017	Judith Pugh	Artist in a Suit – William Dargie
2017	Suzanne Spunner	Indigenous artist Rover Thomas
2017	Terri-ann White	epidemiologist Fiona Stanley
2018	Catherine Bishop	"Annie Lock: A Challenging Woman"
2018	Clem Gorman	Australian artist David Rankin
2018	Jillian Graham	Australian composer Margaret Sutherland
2018	Diana James	"Open Hearted Country: Nganyinytja's Story"
2018	Jacqueline Kent	Vida Goldstein
2018	Drusilla Modjeska	memoir, First Half Second: Volume 2
2018	Andrew Ramsey	Mark Oliphant and Ernest Rutherford
2018	Judith White	"Colin Lanceley: The Artist's World"
2019	James Boyce	Governor Lachlan Macquarie
2019	Stephenie Cahalan	Australian artist Jean Bellette
2019	Gabrielle Carey	Australian writer Elizabeth von Arnim
2019	Eleanor Hogan	Australian writers Ernestine Hill and Daisy Bates
2019	Diana James	"Open Hearted Country: Nganyinytja's Story"
2019	James Mairata	Australian producer Hal McElroy
2019	Brigitta Olubas	Australian writer Shirley Hazzard
2019	Maggie Tonkin	Australian choreographer Meryl Tankard
2020	Margo Beasley	Australian doctor and political activist Eric Dark
2020	Diane Bell	"The Queen and the Protector" – Ngarrindjeri woman Louisa Karpany and South Australian "Sub-Protector of Aborigines" George Mason
2020	Tegan Bennett Daylight	New Zealand-born writer Ruth Park
2020	Stephenie Cahalan	Australian artist Jean Bellette
2020	Gabrielle Carey	Australian writer Elizabeth von Arnim – Highly commended
2020	Madelaine Dickie	Kimberley Indigenous leader Wayne Bergmann
2020	Shakira Hussein	memoir – "Nine Eleven-itis"
2020	Lance Richardson	American writer, naturalist and Zen Buddhist Peter Matthiessen
2020	Suzanne Robinson	"Decadent Melbourne" – art, artists and immorality in the 1890s
2021	Jillian Graham	Australian composer and arts activist Margaret Sutherland
2021	Amanda Lourie	English-born Australian anthropologist and explorer A. W. Howitt
2021	Jo Oliver	Australian artist Adelaide Perry
2021	Sheila Ngoc Pham	Australian science-fiction writer and psychotherapist Anne Spencer Parry
2021	Kate Rice	Australian mother and daughter Marian Dunn and Marian Marcus Clarke
2021	Mandy Sayer	Australia's first female filmmakers – the McDonagh sisters
2021	Michelle Scott Tucker	memoir for Torres Strait Islander Aaron Fa'aoso
2022	Lorin Clarke	memoir of her father, John Clarke
2022	Melanie Duckworth	biography of Christobel Mattingley
2022	Hannah Fink	biography of Rosalie Gascoigne
2022	Kelly Gellatly	biography of Rosalie Gascoigne
2022	Sylvia Martin	artists Eirene Mort and Nora Kate Wilson (highly commended)
2022	Mark Mordue	biography of Nick Cave
2022	Aunty Joy Murphy and Jessica Horton	biography of Aunty Joy’s father, Jarlo Wandoon
2022	Naomi Parry Duncan	biography of Gai-mariagal man, Musquito
2022	Michelle Nayahamui Rooney	biography of Nahau Rooney
2023	Diane Bell	biography of Louisa Karpany and George Mason
2023	Gabrielle Carey	biography of Alex Carey
2023	Aunty Elly Chatfield	memoir of her Stolen Generations experience
2023	Carolyn Dowley	biography of Sadie Canning
2023	Jane McCredie	biography of Jane Eastment
2023	Jo Oliver	biography of Yvonne Boyd
2023	Belinda Probert	biography of Bill Probert, 'Secrets and War: Ambition and identity in 20th-century Britain'
2023	Charlie Ward	biography of Jean Zakaria/Xullwy
2023	Susan Wyndham	biography of Elizabeth Harrower
2024	Kate Fullagar	biography of Marguerite Wolters
2024	Sophie Cull	biography of Calvin Duncan
2024	Carolyn Dowley	biography of Sadie Canning
2024	Erik Jensen	biography of Rafael Bonachela, Sydney Dance Company
2024	Jane McCredie	biography of Jane Eastment
2024	Suzanne Robinson	"Becoming Modern: Australian women composers in London between the wars"
2024	Michelle Scott Tucker	biography of Louisa Lawson
2024	Helen Trinca	biography of Elizabeth Harrower
2024	Charlie Ward	biography of Jean Zakaria and family
2025	Michelle Staff	biography of Bessie Rischbieth and Olive Evans
2025	Lucas Jordan	"Touching the dream-dime"
2025	Jennifer Martin	biography of Eva Sommer
2025	Jo Oliver	biography of Isobel Rae
2025	Monique Rooney	biography of Ruth Park
2025	Melanie Saward	memoir, "With the Feathers"
2025	Michelle Scott Tucker	biography of Louisa Lawson
2025	Yen Tran	memoir of her Vietnamese family
2025	Julienne van Loon	biographical essays on women scientists
2026	Cath Bowdler	"Afterburn" on the 2019–2020 Black Summer fires
2026	Theodore Ell	biography of Les Murray
2026	Jillian Graham	biography of Elena Kats-Chernin
2026	Ali Keshtkar	memoir, "Twelve Hours to Silence"
2026	Flavia Marcello	Italian resistance fighter Carla Capponi
2026	Jennifer Martin	biography of Eva Sommer
2026	Monique Rooney	biography of Ruth Park
2026	Jeff Sparrow	poet and activist Lesbia Harford
2026	Ashleigh Wilson	biography of Barry Humphries
