= Allan & Maria Myers Academic Centre =

Library in Melbourne

The Allan and Maria Myers Academic Centre is a residential college library and resource centre, serving the communities of St Mary's College and Newman College, University of Melbourne. The creation of the academic centre was supported by philanthropists Allan Myers and Maria Myers, who were residents of Newman College and St Mary's College respectively.

== Location ==
The centre is located in the grounds between St Mary's College and Newman College, on Swanston Street, Parkville, a suburb of Melbourne.

== Building ==
The building was designed in 2002 by architects Peter Corrigan and Maggie Edmond, principals of the Melbourne-based architectural firm Edmond and Corrigan, and opened in 2004.

== Facilities ==
The library is open 24 hours a day, 365 days a year. Access is limited to current students of St Mary's and Newman Colleges. Researchers and scholars from outside the College communities may consult library resources by appointment only.

=== Library ===
The centre's library was established by bringing together the collections from the Francis Frewin Library at St Mary's College and the Jerimiah Murphy Library at Newman College. The library presently contains over 50,000 items, from current academic texts to rare and historic books and manuscripts.

The Irish Studies Collection was initially assembled from donations by Nicholas O'Donnell and include pamphlet, softcover, and ephemera holdings of the early Gaelic Revival, mid to late nineteenth-century historical and travel accounts of Ireland, publications of scholars of old and classical Irish from the 19th and early 20th centuries, and Irish religious history.

The Medieval and Renaissance (Early Modern) Manuscript Studies Collection consists of books about medieval and renaissance art which have been assembled over almost half a century of teaching and research by Margaret Manion, an emeritus professor of the University of Melbourne.

=== Tutorial and music practice rooms ===
Ten tutorial rooms support the tutorial programs of both colleges, and four music practice rooms provide space for music practice and rehearsal. The Choir of Newman College rehearses in the Jabiru room, the largest of the practice rooms.

=== Student Lounge ===
The centre also includes a student lounge with tea and coffee making facilities and leisure reading material.
