= Marcus Garvey Library =

Public library in Tottenham, London

Coordinates: 51.5885°N 0.0739°W

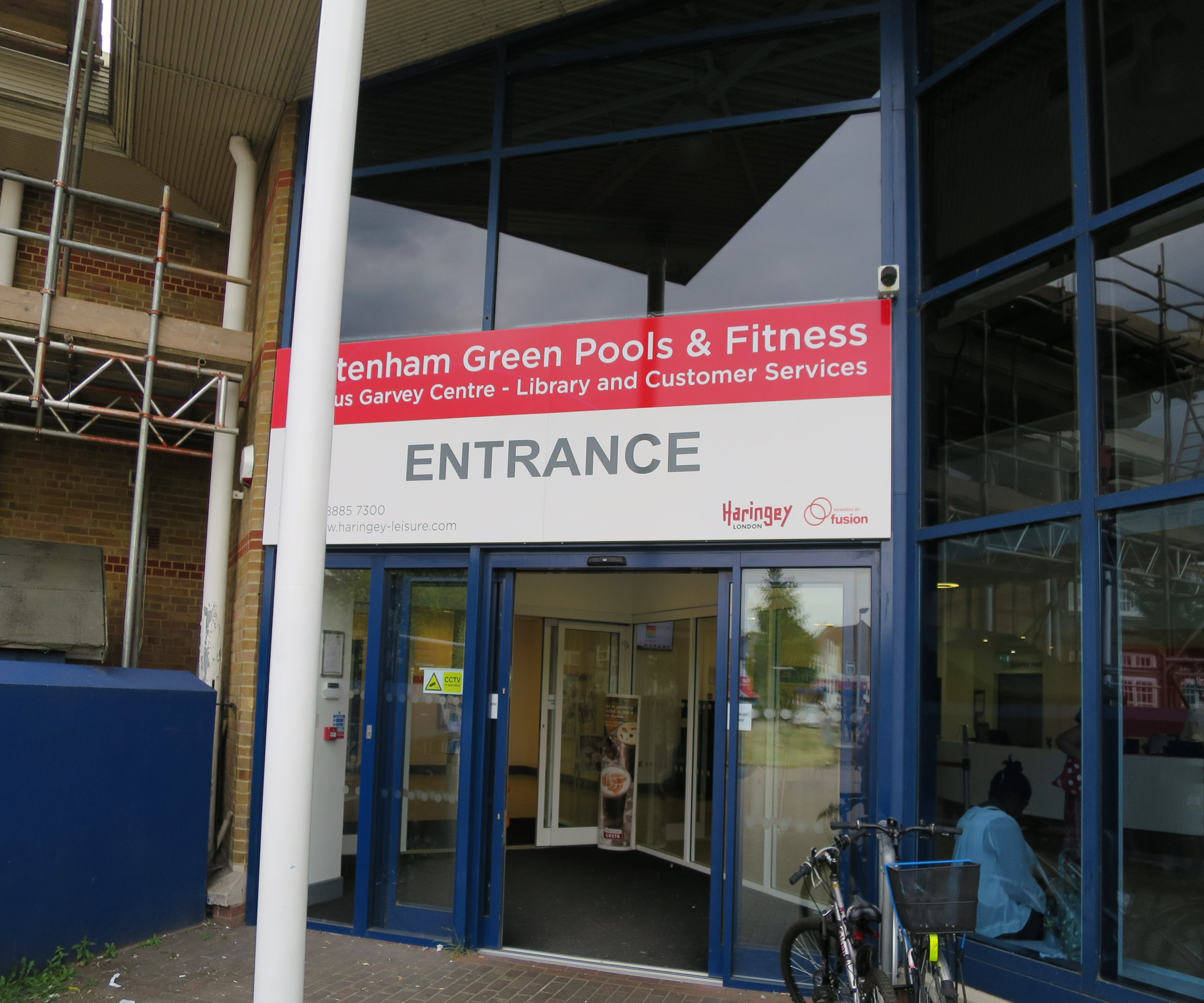
- Location: Tottenham, north London
- Type: public library
- Established: 1987
- Branch of: Haringey Library

Collection
- Size: 13,862 items

Other information
- Website: https://www.haringey.gov.uk/libraries-sport-and-leisure/libraries/marcus-garvey-library

The Marcus Garvey Library in Tottenham, North London, first opened in 1987. It is a branch of Haringey Libraries run by the London Borough of Haringey and is open seven days a week. It has an active friends group; the Friends of Marcus Garvey Library. Its Black Literature and Marcus Garvey collections are among the resources used by a local Black diasporan community.

== History ==
The library as a central library in Tottenham replaces the Carnegie 1907 built Tottenham Central Library; the building still stands on Tottenham High Road.

The library is named after Black activist and businessman Marcus Garvey.

Marcus Garvey's son, Marcus Garvey III, was invited to visit the site of the new library in the Afrikan Jubilee Year in 1987, to lay the building's foundation stone with an inscription which is now displayed with a bust of Garvey in the library foyer.

The building that contains the library, initially called the Tottenham Green Centre (also known as the Marcus Garvey Centre), first opened on 7 August 1987; the library shares the building with a leisure centre.

The library finally opened in 1993. Its development was largely instigated by Bernie Grant, then a Councillor in Haringey.

The building's design has postmodern cladding with yellow and red brick.

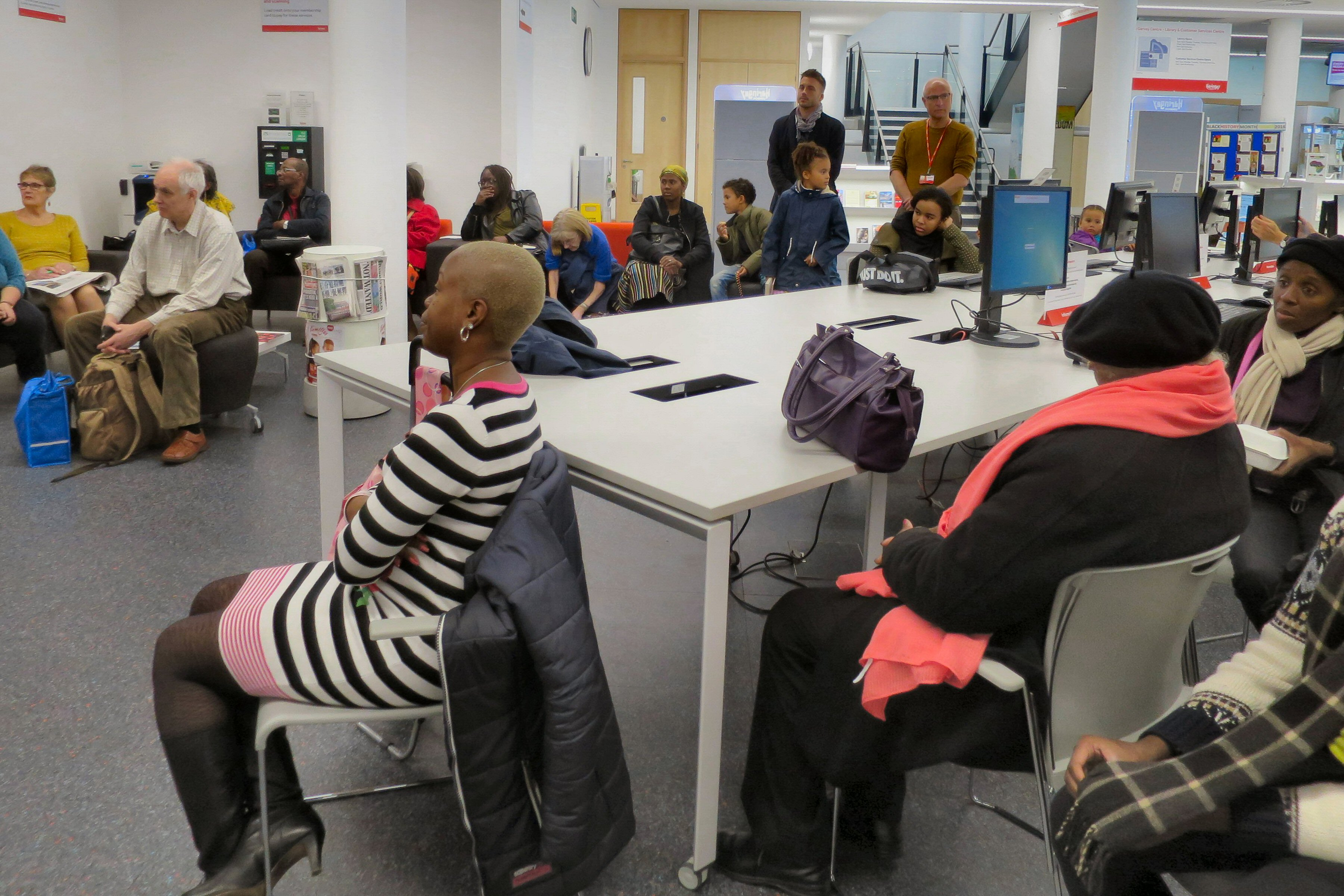
Marcus Garvey Library - Friends Group event in 2016.

In 2015, the council announced plans to move Customer Service Centre facilities into the building, therefore presenting a risk of the library being downgraded and made smaller, to which the Friends of the library launched a campaign and petition. The campaign was supported by local politicians such as Jeremy Corbyn and David Lammy who said he was frustrated that Haringey's public consultation had been "poor".

The library reopened in 2016 with this change which included a £3 million refurbishment.

In early 2024, Haringey Council proposed a 31% cut to the library service, as reported by the Friends of the library.

== Services and collection ==
The library has a Black literature section, as well as a large collection relating to Marcus Garvey, including biographical books, speeches and essays about Garvey. There are also portraits of Marcus Garvey on the library's walls.

The library has a children's section and a garden.

Black History Month celebrated at the library annually in October includes guest speakers, plays, dances and new book launches.

Patrick Vernon in 2011 described the library as having "a large diaspora community of Jamaicans and people from the Caribbean who frequently use it to be inspired or to learn about the black contribution to British and world history... I have given talks on family genealogy, screened films and promoted authors and publications here."

The library is one of Haringey's nine Libraries, and in 2022 the service joined The Library Consortium (TLC).

== Exhibitions ==
A selection of exhibitions that have been at the library over the years include:

- Making Freedom: Riots, rebellions and revolutions by the Windrush Foundation. August 2013.
- Celebrating the Life of Cy Grant – Touring Exhibition. 1–30 November 2016.
- Bernie Grant Exhibition. Organised by Friends of Marcus Garvey Library, CONEL, Sharon Grant, the Bernie Grant Archives and artists Sharon Foster and Caroline Rault. September 2018.

In December 2023 a music night headlined by Hot Chip's Alexis Taylor at the library was the launch of the Alexandra Palace Rhythm Stick festival.

== In popular culture ==
The library is mentioned in a story in Foreign Soil by Maxine Beneba Clarke
