= Albert Power (priest) =

British Jesuit (1870–1948)

The Very Reverend Albert Power SJ
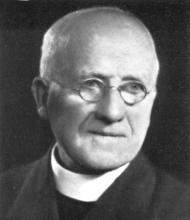
- Born: 12 November 1870; Dublin, Ireland
- Died: 12 October 1948 (aged 77); Melbourne, Australia
- Resting place: Boroondara, Kew
- Occupations: Priest, author, academic
- Title: The Very Reverend

Albert Power SJ (12 November 1870 – 12 October 1948) was a Roman Catholic Jesuit priest, academic and author. He was considered to be one of the best-known Jesuit priests in Australia and had the nickname "The Mighty Atom".

== Biography ==
=== Early years ===
Albert Power was born in Dublin, Ireland, in 1870. His education started at Belvedere College, Dublin, and continued at Tullabeg College, County Offaly.

After Tullabeg College he studied at Milltown Park Theological College, Dublin.

He was ordained as a Roman Catholic priest in 1906 in the Society of Jesus.

=== Career ===
After his ordination, Power became the director of studies at Riverview College (now called Saint Ignatius' College, Riverview) in Sydney for six years (c. 1910).

Power returned to Europe to study philosophy and literature in Valkenburg, Holland. He was there for two years and then returned to Milltown Park Theological College, Dublin, to study the same subjects. He lectured in theology, Scripture and ecclesiastical history for ten years as the Professor of Sacred Scriptures at Milltown Institute of Theology and Philosophy. For the latter eight years he was also the rector of the college.

Power returned to Australia in 1919 to become the rector of Newman College, Melbourne. The Archbishop of Melbourne, Daniel Mannix, insisted that Power, a classical scholar, was appointed to the role. In a telegram Mannix wrote "Power or nobody." Upon taking up the role he said that his policy would be "to act in accordance with the great cardinal after whom it was named, and to provide a liberal Christian education". Power started at Newman College with a "big reputation for scholastic attainments". At the end of his first year as rector, Power wrote that expenses had not been covered and that they had nothing to pay to the Jesuits. He held the role of rector of Newman College until 1923.

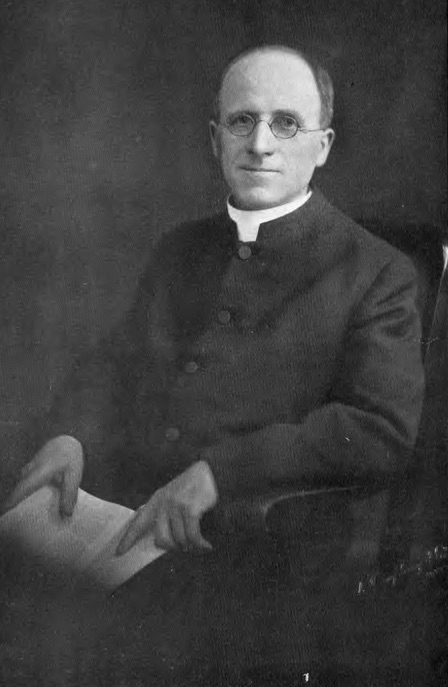
Power as rector of Newman College, Melbourne

In 1923 he became the first rector, at the request of Mannix, of Corpus Christi College, Melbourne, when it was founded in the same year.

=== Retirement ===
After retiring in 1948 he resided at Xavier College, Kew, for a number of years.

=== Death ===
After Power's death a Solemn Pontificial Requiem Mass was celebrated by Archbishop Daniel Mannix at St Patrick's Cathedral, Melbourne. The choir was made up of students from Corpus Christi College.

== Under surveillance ==
On 19 April 1918 a letter was passed between Australian security officials advising the recipient to keep "Power under observation". The letter writer commented that "he [Power] is an eloquent speaker, and has great influence" and that "the object of his visit [to Australia] is unknown".

A further letter was written on 13 July 1918 in which the writer supports the rumour that the position of chaplain on-board a troop ship is an "excellent way of taking Sinn Féin propagandists into the Commonwealth of Nations".

== Father Albert Power Burse ==
In January 1952, "A Grateful Friend" wrote to the editor of The Advocate (Melbourne) noting that a burse was being created in memory of Power to educate a priest for the Jesuit Indian Mission.

== Albert Power Debating Society ==
In the 1954 Newman College yearbook the Albert Power Debating Society is reported as having had large numbers participating in the society. Issues debated included "That Newman should have a moat" and "that the press is worth of its freedom". Perhaps the most engaging debate was with a team of ladies from St Mary's Hall when the subject was "that it was better to have loved and lost then never to have loved at all".

The Albert Power Debating Society is known to have run between 1927 and 1967 when its activities were reported in the Newman College yearbooks. The society is known to have had problems with numbers of students participating in its activities in 1937 when the annual magazine of the Newman College Students' Club reported that the society had to close for a year.

In 2010 the Albert Power SJ Medallion for Debating was awarded to Tom Litfin and Patrick McDonald.

== Publications ==
Power had a number of books published and wrote pamphlets for the Australian Catholic Truth Society.

- Are They All Wrong?, publication date unknown.
- Six World Problems, 1927.
- Our Lady's Titles, 1928.
- Why We Honor St.Joseph, 1930.
- Plain Reasons For Being a Catholic, 1929.
