= St Mary's College, Melbourne =

St Mary's College, Melbourne may refer to:

- St Mary's College, Melbourne (residential college), a Catholic residential college affiliated with the University of Melbourne, Victoria
- St Mary's College, Melbourne (school), a Catholic school, with campuses located in St Kilda and Windsor, Melbourne, Victoria
