= Peter Steele (poet) =

Australian poet (1939–2012)

- Born: Peter Daniel Steele; 22 August 1939; Perth, Western Australia
- Died: 27 June 2012 (aged 72); Kew, Victoria, Australia
- Education: University of Melbourne
- Occupations: Poet and academic
- Known for: Plenty: Art into Poetry
- Awards: Christopher Brennan Award (2010)

Peter Daniel Steele AM (22 August 1939 – 27 June 2012) was an Australian poet and academic at the University of Melbourne. He was also a member of the Jesuit order and a Catholic priest. He was awarded the Christopher Brennan Award, for lifetime achievement in poetry, in 2010.

== Early life and education ==
Peter Daniel Steele was born on 22 August 1939, the eldest of three sons, to an English immigrant father and Irish-English-Australian mother, Jesse. His father became Catholic when he married Jesse, and Peter was pious as a boy.

Steele grew up in Perth, Western Australia. He was educated at Christian Brothers' College there, then Loyola College in Melbourne. He attended the University of Melbourne (MA and PhD); Canisius College in Sydney, and the Jesuit Theological College in Melbourne.

== Career ==
In 1966, Steele joined the English Department at the University of Melbourne, and was appointed to a personal chair in English there in 1993. He went on to become emeritus professor of English at the university after his retirement in 2005.

The poem "Saying" was published in Meanjin Quarterly in March 1965.

Steele became a much published poet, critic, and commentator in books, magazines, and journals.

== Recognition and honours ==
He was a Fellow of the Australian Academy of the Humanities and Lockie Fellow at the University of Melbourne. He was a visiting professor at the University of Alberta, at Georgetown University in Washington, D.C., and at Loyola University Chicago.

In 2012, he was made a Member of the Order of Australia, for service to literature and higher education as a poet, author, scholar and teacher, and to the Catholic Church.

Other recognition and honours include:

- 2008: Honorary doctorate (DLitt), by the University of Melbourne
- 2009: Philip Hodgins Memorial Medal at Mildura Writers' Festival
- 2010: Christopher Brennan Award for Lifetime Achievement at the Fellowship of Australian Writers Victoria National Literary Awards
- 2010: Honorary doctorate, Notre Dame University, Indiana, US
- 2011: Honorary doctorate, Australian Catholic University, Canberra

== Death and legacy ==
Steele died of liver cancer several years after diagnosis, on 27 June 2012 at Caritas Christi Hospice in Kew, Melbourne, aged 72. He was survived by one brother, Jack.

=== Peter Steele Poetry Award ===
The Peter Steele Poetry Award is a scholarship available to PhD students at the University of Melbourne, funded by the Peter Steele Poetry Trust Fund, which was established by Susan Crennan AC QC in November 2017. The endowment is supplied by a group of donors, including Susan Crennan, Michael Crennan QC, Allan Myers AC QC, and Maria Myers AC, Peter's brother Jack Steele, and others.

=== Peter Steele Poet in Residence ===
The Peter Steele Poet in Residence is a residency set up in late 2022. The inaugural poet in residence, from January 2023, is Maxine Beneba Clarke.

== Selected bibliography ==
=== Poetry collections ===
- Word from Lilliput : poems. 1973.
- Marching on Paradise. 1984.
- Invisible Riders (1999)
- Plenty: Art into Poetry (2003)
- The Whispering Gallery: Art Into Poetry (2006)
- White Knight with Beebox: New and Selected Poems (2008)
- A Local Habitation: Poems and Homilies (2010)
- The Gossip and the Wine (2011)

=== Non-fiction ===
- Jonathan Swift: Preacher and Jester (1978)
- The Autobiographical Passion: studies in the self on show (1989)
- "Joseph Brodsky 1940–1996". Tribute. Quadrant. 40 (3): 16–17. March 1996.
- Bread for the Journey: Homilies (2002)
- Braiding the Voices: Essays in Poetry (2012)
