= Daniel Madigan =

Australian Jesuit priest and Quranic studies scholar (born 1954)

Daniel A. Madigan SJ (born 1954) is an Australian Jesuit priest and Quranic studies scholar, who serves as Rector of Newman College at the University of Melbourne. He is the Matteo Ricci Professor of Interreligious Theology and serves as the director of the Loyola Institute at Australian Catholic University. He is an associate professor emeritus and a former Jeanette W. and Otto J. Ruesch Distinguished Jesuit Scholar at Georgetown University.

== Life and career ==
Before joining Georgetown, Madigan taught in Rome from 2000 to 2007, where he founded and directed the Institute for the Study of Religions and Cultures at the Pontifical Gregorian University from 2002 to 2007. He became a member of Georgetown's Department of Theology in 2008 as the Jeanette W. and Otto J. Ruesch Family Professor and was named emeritus in 2021. Additionally, he has served as a visiting professor at Columbia University, Ankara University and Boston College.

Since 2013, Madigan has been chair of the Building Bridges Seminar, an annual meeting of Muslim and Christian scholars begun in 2002 by the then Archbishop of Canterbury, George Carey, and continued by his successor, Rowan Williams, from 2003 to 2012. The seminar meets for five days of small-group study of scriptural texts relevant to a particular topic of common interest.

== Works ==
- The Qur'ân's Self-Image: Writing and Authority in Islam's Scripture (2001)
- The Routledge Companion to the Qur'an (ed.) (2022) with George Archer and Maria Massi Dakake

== See also ==
- A.H. Mathias Zahniser
