= Mandy Sayer =

Australian writer (born 1963)

External videos
- One Plus One: Mandy Sayer, One Plus One, ABC News

Mandy Sayer (born 1963) is an Australian novelist and narrative non-fiction writer.

She was born in 1963 in the Sydney suburb of Marrickville, the third of three children. She began writing poetry and stories at the age of six. Her parents separated when she was aged ten. In 1983, she travelled to the United States with her father Gerry, a jazz drummer. To earn a living, they busked on the streets of New York City, New Orleans and Colorado for three years; Gerry played drums and Mandy tap danced. Her first memoir, Dreamtime Alice (1998), was based on these experiences. It was published to acclaim in Australia, the United States, the United Kingdom, Germany, and Brazil, and won the 2000 National Biography Award and Australian Audio Book of the Year.

In 1985 in New Orleans during Mardi Gras she met Yusef Komunyakaa, an African-American war poet (later to win a Pulitzer Prize). They discovered a mutual interest in jazz and the novels of Patrick White. That year they married, and he became a professor at Indiana University, where she studied for an MA in English and Creative Writing. and where she became a member of the Bill Evans Dance Company. She also studied narrative non-fiction writing with the celebrated author, Maxine Hong Kingston. During this time, she won the Vogel Award for her first novel, Mood Indigo (1990), which was followed by Blind Luck (1993), and The Cross (1995). Sayer and Komunyakaa divorced in 1995, after the birth of his child from a one-night stand he had with a former girlfriend. During their marriage, Sayer miscarried one child and terminated another pregnancy against Komyunakaa's wishes. She discusses this in her third memoir, The Poet's Wife (2014), the writing of which was prompted by the 2003 murder-suicide of Komunyakaa’s subsequent partner, Reetika Vazirani, and their two-year-old son, Jehan.

On return to Australia, she gained a Doctorate from the University of Technology Sydney. In 1997, she was named one of Ten Best Young Australian Novelists by The Sydney Morning Herald. In 2003, she married novelist and playwright Louis Nowra, becoming his third wife. They had worked together when they co-edited the anthology In the Gutter ... Looking at the Stars in 2000. Shortly after their marriage Sayer wrote and published her second memoir, Velocity, about her unconventional and chaotic childhood, which won the South Australian Premier’s Award for Non-Fiction, and The Age Book of the Year for Non-Fiction. Sayer and Nowra have separate homes not far from each other near Kings Cross, in which their daytime writing activities are conducted, and they come together in the evening.

Sayer’s poetry has been published in the Jazz Poetry Anthology, the Australian newspaper, and the Best Australian Poetry series. Between 2006 and 2016 she was a columnist for Sydney newspaper, The Wentworth Courier, and for two years penned a humorous column in The Australian. Her investigative journalism, reviews, and essays have appeared in The Monthly, The Good Weekend, Griffith Review, The Spectator, The Australian Weekend Magazine, Australian Geographic, the Sydney Morning Herald, and many other journals and magazines.

In 2009, Sayer was named the annual Scholar-in-Writing at the University of Technology, Sydney, and in February 2014, she and Nowra were named joint holders of the 2014 Copyright Agency Non-Fiction Writer-in-Residence at the University of Technology.

In 2021, she was the recipient of the Hazel Rowley Literary Fellowship to complete her biography, Those Dashing McDonagh Sisters: Australia’s First Female Filmmaking Team.

== Work ==
Mandy Sayer's writings include:

Non-Fiction

- 'Dreamtime Alice (1998; won the 2000 National Biography Award (joint winner); Australian Audio Book of the Year Award; and New England Booksellers' Award)
- Velocity (2005; won the 2006 South Australian Premier's Award for Non-Fiction and the 2006 The Age Book of the Year (Non-Fiction))
- The Poet's Wife (2014)
- Coco: Autobiography of my Dog (2012)
- Australian Gypsies: Their Secret History (2017)
- Misfits and Me: Collected Non-Fiction (2018)
- Those Dashing McDonagh Sisters: Australia's First Female Filmmaking Team (2022)

Novels

- Mood Indigo (1990; won The Australian/Vogel Literary Award)
- Blind Luck (1993)
- The Cross (1995; finalist in the Ned Kelly Award for first crime novel, shortlisted for the Nita Kibble Literary Award, and nominated for the International Dublin Literary Award)
- The Night has a Thousand Eyes (2007; won the 2008 Davitt Award for Young Adult Fiction)
- Love in the Years of Lunacy (2011)

Short story collections

- Fifteen Kinds of Desire (2001)

Anthologies

- In the Gutter ... Looking at the Stars (2000; co-edited with Louis Nowra)
- The Australian Long Story (2009)
