= Maxine Beneba Clarke =

Australian writer

Maxine Beneba Clarke is an Australian writer of Afro-Caribbean descent, whose work includes fiction, non-fiction, plays and poetry. She is the author of over fifteen books for children and adults, notably a short story collection entitled Foreign Soil (2014), and her 2016 memoir The Hate Race, which she adapted for a stage production debuting in February 2024. Her poetry collections include Carrying the World (2016), How Decent Folk Behave (2021), It's the Sound of the Thing: 100 New Poems for Young People (2023), Stuff I'm (NOT) Sorry For: 99 more poems for young people (2025), and Beautiful Changelings (2025). From 2023 to 2025, Clarke was the inaugural Peter Steele Poet in Residence at the University of Melbourne.

== Early life and education ==
Maxine Beneba Clarke was born and raised in the Sydney suburb of Kellyville. Her mother was an actress of Guyanese heritage and her father an academic of Jamaican descent, who migrated to Australia from England in 1976. She has said: "Cousins, aunts, and uncles of mine have settled all over the world: including in Germany, America, Switzerland, Australia, England, and Barbados. Mine is a complex migration history that spans four continents and many hundreds of years: a history that involves loss of land, loss of agency, loss of language, and loss, transformation, and reclamation of culture."

Beneba Clarke attended school in Kellyville and Baulkham Hills, before going on to earn a Bachelor of Creative Arts and law degree (with majors in creative writing and human rights) from the University of Wollongong.

She moved to Melbourne.

== Career ==
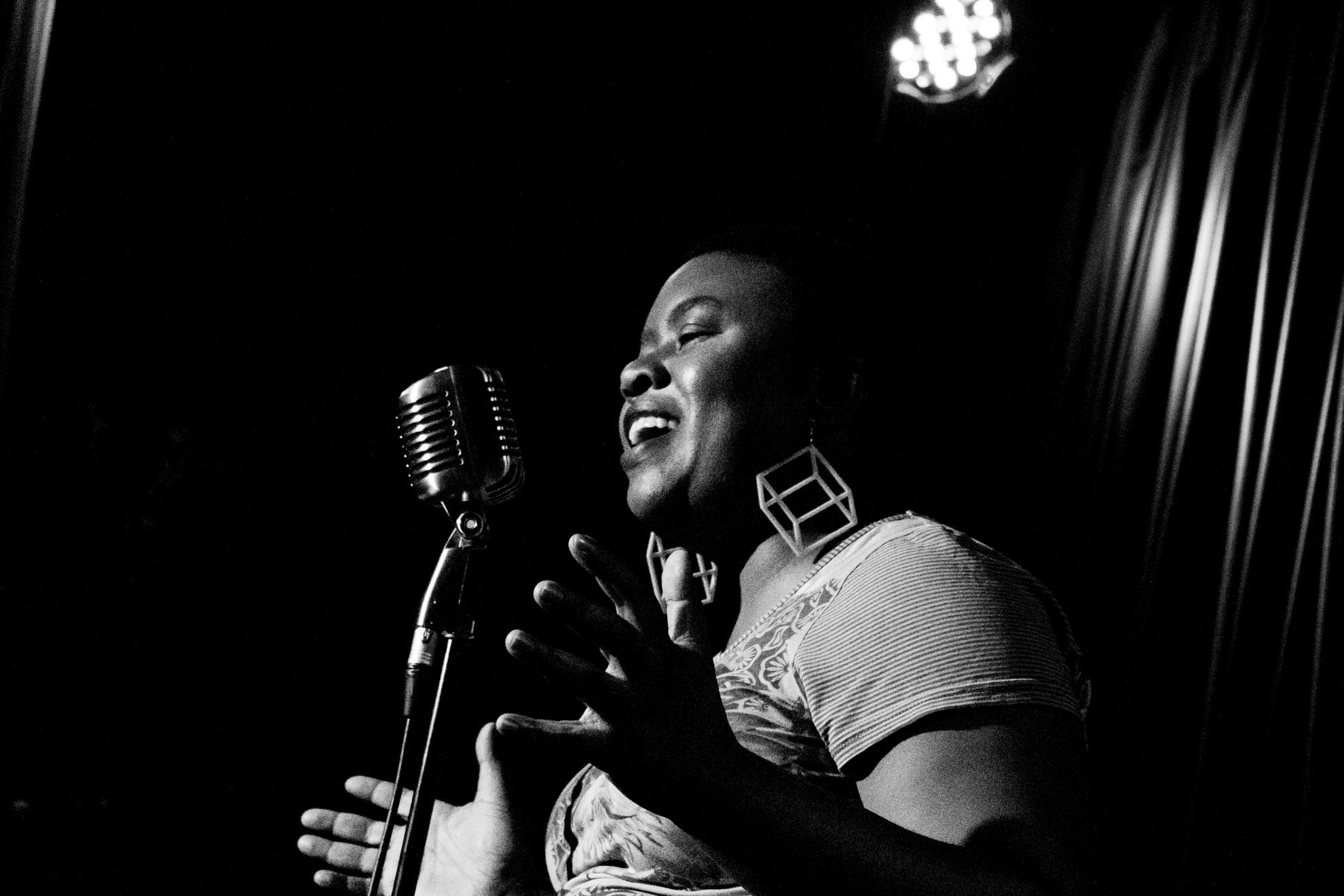
Maxine Beneba Clarke performing at the Melbourne Spoken Word and Poetry Festival, May 2018

Clarke published a number of short works, before publishing a collection of short stories that focuses on the African diaspora, called Foreign Soil, in 2014. She went on to publish many more works of different genres, including poetry.

She has been a contributor to The Saturday Paper. Her work is included in the 2019 anthology New Daughters of Africa, edited by Margaret Busby.

In December 2022 Clarke was announced as the University of Melbourne's inaugural Peter Steele Poet in Residence, named in honour of Australian poet Peter Steele (1939–2012). The residency, which began in January 2023, was planned to last for a year; however, this was extended until 2025.

Clarke wrote a stage adaptation of The Hate Race for Malthouse Theatre in Melbourne, which debuted in February 2024. It is performed as a one-woman show by Zahra Newman, with sounds and music provided by musician Kuda Mapeza.

== Recognition and awards ==
Clarke's collection of short stories Foreign Soil won the 2013 Victorian Premier's Unpublished Manuscript Award, the 2015 Australian Book Industry Award (ABIA) for Best Literary Fiction, and the 2015 Indie Book Award for Best Debut Fiction, and was shortlisted for the 2015 Stella Prize.

Her memoir The Hate Race (2016) won the New South Wales Premier's Literary Award, and was shortlisted for the Stella Prize, the Victorian Premier's Literary Award for non-fiction and an ABIA for non-fiction.

Her poetry collection Carrying The World won the 2017 Victorian Premier's Prize for Poetry. Her picture book The Patchwork Bike (2016), illustrated by Melbourne artist Van Thanh Rudd, won the Crichton Award for Children's Book Illustration.

In 2021, Clarke was voted the "People's Choice" for the triennial Melbourne Prize for Literature, for an outstanding body of work.

Clarke has received several writing awards and fellowships, including:

- 2013: Ada Cambridge Poetry Prize
- 2013: Australia Council grant
- 2014: Hazel Rowley Literary Fellowship
- 2015: Winner, Indie Book Award for Best Debut Fiction, for Foreign Soil
- 2015: Australian Book Industry Awards (ABIA) – Australian Literary Fiction Book of the Year (2015)
- 2015: Sydney Morning Herald Best Young Novelist of the Year
- 2017: Winner, Victorian Premier's Prize for Poetry, for Carrying the World
- 2017: Winner, NSW Multicultural Award in the New South Wales Premier's Literary Award, for The Hate Race
- 2017: Honour Book, Crichton Award for Children's Book Illustration, for The Patchwork Bike (with Van Thanh Rudd)
- 2019: Winner, Boston Globe–Horn Book Award, Picture Book Award for The Patchwork Bike, illustrated by Melbourne artist Van Thanh Rudd
- 2021: Melbourne Prize for Literature, Civic Choice Award
- 2021: Longlisted, Kate Greenaway Medal, for When We Say Black Lives Matter
- 2022: Appointed Peter Steele Poet in Residence; ongoing as of 2024
- 2024: Australian Book Industry Awards (ABIA) - Book of the Year for Younger Children (ages 7–12) for It's the Sound of the Thing.
- 2024: Critics Award for Best Play for The Hate Race (a stage adaptation) - Time Out Melbourne Awards 2024
- 2025: Green Room Award nomination for Best New Australian Writing for The Hate Race (a stage adaptation)

== Works ==
Clarke's works include:

=== As author ===
- Sagittarius Rising, a verse novel for children (2026)
- Beautiful Changelings, a poetry collection (2025)
- Stuff I'm (NOT) Sorry For: 99 more poems for young people, a poetry collection (2025)
- The Hate Race: a stage adaptation (2024)
- We Know a Place, a picture book illustrated by the author (2023)
- It’s the Sound of the Thing: 100 new poems for young people, a poetry collection (2023).
- 11 Words for Love, a picture book written by Randa Abdel-Fattah - as illustrator (2022).
- How Decent Folk Behave (2021), a poetry collection
- When We Say Black Lives Matter (2020), a picture book illustrated by the author
- Meet Taj at the Lighthouse (2020), an early reader chapter book in the Aussie Kids book series.
- The Saturday Portraits (2019), a collection of creative non-fiction profiles published in The Saturday Paper
- Fashionista (2019), a picture book illustrated by the author
- Wide Big World (2018), a picture book illustrated by Isobel Knowles
- The Hate Race (2016), an autobiography
- Carrying The World (2016), a collection of poetry
- The Patchwork Bike (2016), a picture book illustrated by Van Thanh Rudd
- Foreign Soil (2014), a collection of short stories
- Nothing Here Needs Fixing (2013), a collection of poetry
- Gil Scott Heron is on Parole (2008), a collection of poetry

=== As editor ===
- Growing Up African in Australia (Black Inc., 2019)
- The Best Australian Stories 2017 (Black Inc., 2017)

=== As illustrator ===
- 11 Words for Love (by Randa Abdel-Fattah, 2022)
