= The Patchwork Bike =

Book by Maxine Beneba Clarke

- 1st Edition Cover
- Author: Maxine Beneba Clarke
- Illustrator: Van Thanh Rudd
- Language: English
- Genre: Children's picture book
- Publisher: Lothian Children's Books
- Publication date: October 25, 2016
- Publication place: Australia
- Pages: 30 (unpaginated)
- ISBN: 978-0-73441-668-1
- OCLC: 1037337688

The Patchwork Bike is a 2016 children's book by Maxine Beneba Clarke and illustrated by Van Thanh Rudd.

== Plot ==
A girl who lives at the edge of a "no-go desert" describes the titular bike that she and her brothers made out of found materials.

== Publication history ==
- 2016, Australia, Lothian Children's Books ISBN 978-0-73441-668-1
- 2018, USA, Candlewick Press ISBN 978-1-53620-031-7

== Reception ==
The book was well reviewed, receiving starred reviews in The Bulletin of the Center for Children's Books, The Horn Book Magazine, Kirkus Reviews, Publishers Weekly, and School Library Journal, who also named it to their list of best picture books of 2018. The New York Times Book Editor Maria Russo called it an "exuberant... Clarke’s poetically compressed language hurtles joyfully along, while Rudd’s illustrations, made on cardboard boxes with spirited swaths of paint, burst with irrepressible life."

It has also been reviewed by Reading Time, Books+Publishing, and Magpies.

== Awards ==
- 2019 ALSC Notable Children's Book
- 2019 Boston Globe–Horn Book Award winner
- 2019 Charlotte Zolotow Award highly commended
- 2019 Notable Social Studies Trade Books For Young People - Social Interactions/Relationships
- 2019 USBBY Outstanding International Book
- 2018 The Bulletin of the Center for Children's Books Blue Ribbon
- 2018 Patricia Wrightson Prize for Children’s Literature shortlist
- 2017 Children's Book of the Year Award: Picture Book honour
- 2017 Crichton Award for Children's Book Illustration winner
