= Yusef Komunyakaa =

American poet (born 1940s)

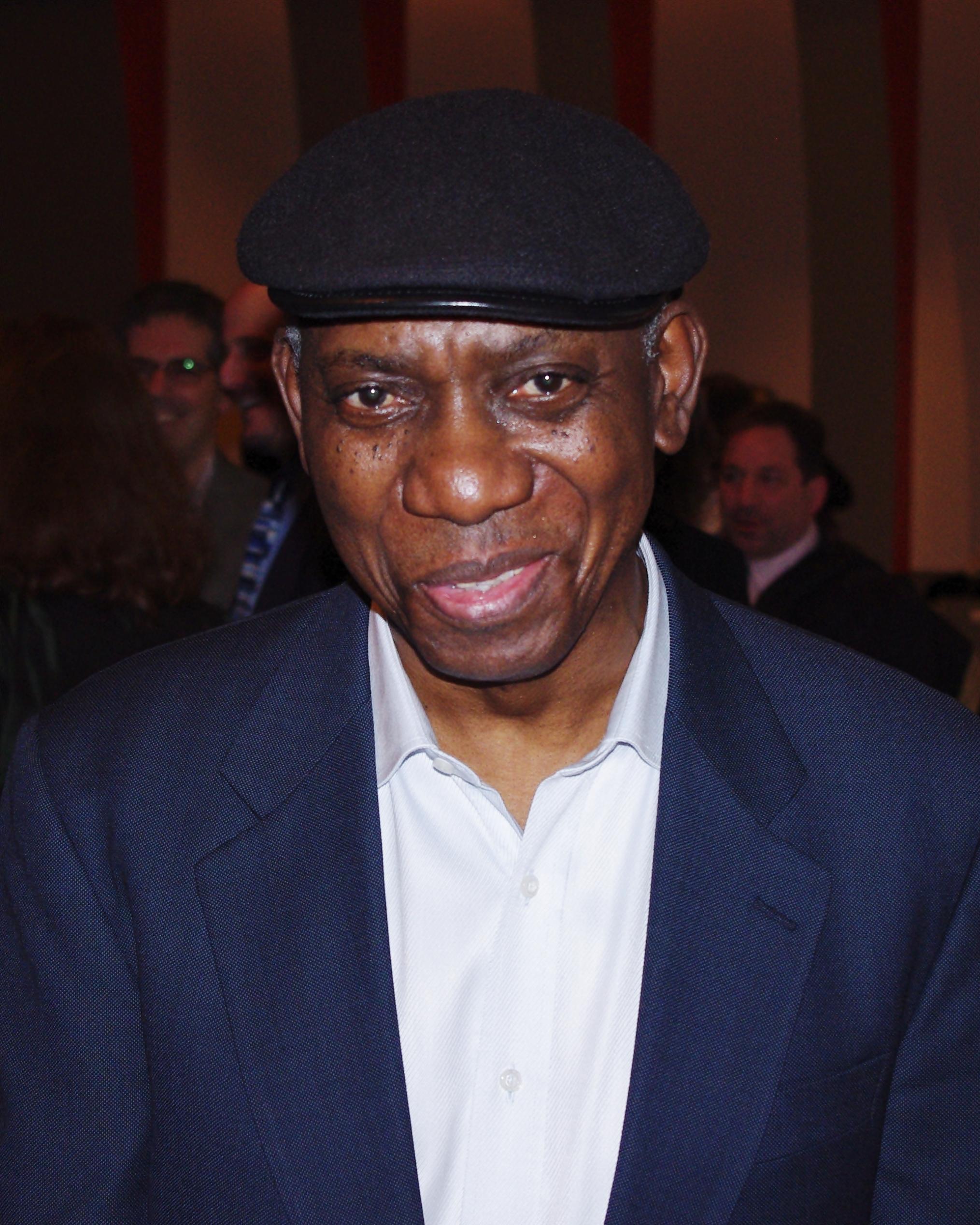
- Komunyakaa at the 2011 National Book Critics Circle Awards in March 2012.
- Born: James William Brown; April 29, 1941 (age 85); Bogalusa, Louisiana, U.S.
- Education: University of Colorado, Colorado Springs (BA); Colorado State University (MA); University of California, Irvine (MFA)
- Employer: New York University
- Writing career
- Genre: Poetry
- Notable work: Facing It
- Notable awards: Kingsley Tufts Poetry Award; Pulitzer Prize for Poetry; Ruth Lilly Poetry Prize; Zbigniew Herbert Award.

Yusef Komunyakaa (born James William Brown Jr.; April 29, 1941 or 1947) is an American poet who teaches at New York University and is a member of the Fellowship of Southern Writers. Komunyakaa is a recipient of the 1994 Kingsley Tufts Poetry Award for Neon Vernacular and the 1994 Pulitzer Prize for Poetry. He also received the Ruth Lilly Poetry Prize in 2001. Komunyakaa received the 2007 Louisiana Writer Award for his contribution to poetry.

His subject matters include the Black experience, rural Southern life before the civil rights movement, and his experience as a soldier during the Vietnam War.

== Early life and education ==
Komunyakaa was born in 1947 and was given the name James William Brown Junior (although his former wife said in her memoir that he was born in 1941). He grew up in the small town of Bogalusa, Louisiana. As an adult, he reclaimed the name Komunyakaa, the name of his grandfather who had reached the United States as a stowaway in a ship from Trinidad.

Komunyakaa served in the U.S. Army, serving one tour of duty in South Vietnam during the Vietnam War. According to his former wife, Mandy Sayer, he was discharged on 14 December 1966. He worked as a specialist for the military paper Southern Cross, covering actions and stories, interviewing fellow soldiers, and publishing articles on Vietnamese history, which earned him a Bronze Star. He has since used these experiences as the source of his war poetry collections Toys in a Field (1986) and Dien Cai Dau (1988). Following his return to the United States, he found the American people's rejection of Vietnam veterans to be as painful as the racism he had experienced while growing up in the American South before the Civil Rights Movement.

== Education ==
After his service, he attended college at the University of Colorado Colorado Springs, where he was an editor for and contributor to the campus arts and literature publication riverrun. He began to write poetry in 1973 and took the name Yusef Komunyakaa. He earned his M.A. in writing from Colorado State University in 1978, and an M.F.A. in creative writing from the University of California, Irvine, in 1980.

== Teaching career ==
After receiving his M.F.A., Komunyakaa began teaching poetry in the New Orleans public school system and teaching creative writing at the University of New Orleans.

In 1985, he was hired as an associate professor at Indiana University Bloomington. He also held the Ruth Lilly Professorship for two years from 1989 to 1990. Komunyakaa taught there through 1996. In the fall of 1997, he became a professor in the Program in Creative Writing at Princeton University. Yusef Komunyakaa is a professor in the Creative Writing Program at New York University.

== Poetry ==
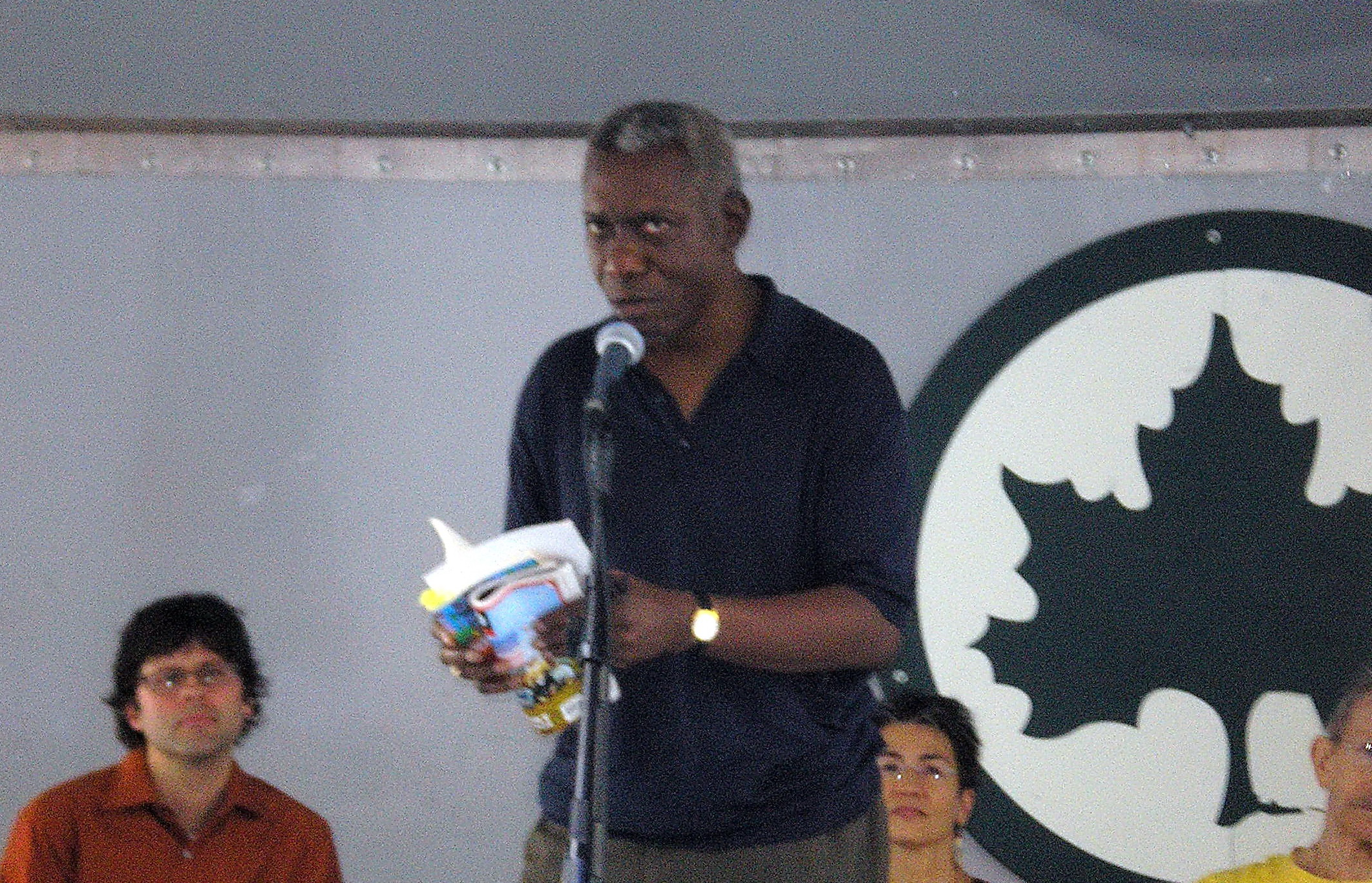
Komunyakaa at the 2006 Brooklyn Book Festival.

Komunyakaa's I Apologize for the Eyes in My Head, published in 1986, won the San Francisco Poetry Center Award. Dien Cai Dau, published in 1988, focused on his experiences in Vietnam and won the Dark Room Poetry Prize.

His 1993 book Neon Vernacular won the 1994 Pulitzer Prize for Poetry.

Komunyakaa collaborated with dramaturge and theater producer Chad Gracia on a dramatic adaptation of the Epic of Gilgamesh, published in 2006 by Wesleyan University Press. In spring 2008, New York's 92nd Street Y staged a one-night reading directed by Robert Scanlon. In May 2013 it received a full production by the Constellation Theatre Company in Washington, D.C. His 2011 book The Chameleon Couch was a finalist for the 2012 International Griffin Poetry Prize.

In 2026, he received the Rebekah Johnson Bobbitt National Prize for Lifetime Achievement in Poetry from the Library of Congress.

== Personal life ==
Komunyakaa married Australian novelist Mandy Sayer in 1985. He and Sayer were married for ten years and have a daughter.

Komunyakaa later had a relationship with India-born poet Reetika Vazirani, with whom he had a child. Vazirani died in a murder-suicide, killing their son Jehan and herself in 2003; he was two years old.

== Style and influences ==
In a 2018 interview, Komunyakaa compared his work to that of a painter or carpenter. He also stated that he finds his poetic work more violent than journalism and that it is a violence like that of the natural world.

In another interview, Komunyakaa described the biblical influences in his work. He recalled reading the Bible in his youth and discovering its underlying poetic elements. Komunyakaa also mentions early influences such as Langston Hughes, Paul Laurence Dunbar, and Phillis Wheatley.

== Bibliography ==
=== Poetry ===
Collections

- Dedications and Other Darkhorses, R.M.C.A.J. Books, 1977
- Lost in the Bone Wheel Factory, Lynx House, 1979, ISBN 0-89924-018-6
- Copacetic, Wesleyan University Press, 1984, ISBN 0-8195-1117-X
- I Apologize for the Eyes in My Head, Wesleyan University Press, 1986, ISBN 0-8195-5144-9
- Toys in a Field, Black River Press, 1986
- Dien Cai Dau, Wesleyan University Press, 1988, ISBN 0-8195-1164-1
- Magic City, Wesleyan University Press, 1992, ISBN 0-8195-1208-7
- Neon Vernacular, Wesleyan University Press, 1993 ISBN 0-8195-1211-7
- Thieves of Paradise, Wesleyan University Press, 1998 ISBN 0-8195-6422-2
- Pleasure Dome, Wesleyan University Press, 2001, ISBN 0-8195-6425-7
- Talking Dirty to the Gods, Farrar, Straus and Giroux, 2001, ISBN 0-374-52793-8
- Taboo, Farrar, Straus and Giroux, 2004, ISBN 0-374-29148-9
- Gilgamesh, Wesleyan University Press, 2006, ISBN 0-8195-6824-4
- Warhorses, Farrar, Straus and Giroux, 2008, ISBN 978-0-374-53191-1
- The Chameleon Couch, Farrar, Straus and Giroux, 2011, ISBN 978-0-374-12038-2
- The Emperor of Water Clocks Farrar, Straus and Giroux, 2015 ISBN 978-0-374-14783-9

List of poems

Title	Year	First published	Reprinted
After Summer Fell Apart	2001	Pleasure Dome	
Blues Chant Hoodoo Revival	2001	Pleasure Dome	
Camouflaging the Chimera	2001	Pleasure Dome	
Confluence	2001	Pleasure Dome	
English	2011	The Chameleon Couch	
Envoy to Palestine	2015	The Emperor of Water Clocks	
Facing It	2001	Pleasure Dome	
Fortress	2014	"Fortress". The New Yorker. 90 (12): 48–50. May 12, 2014.	
Ghazal, After Ferguson	2015	The Emperor of Water Clocks	
Grunge	2011	The Chameleon Couch	
Infidelity	2001	Talking Dirty to the Gods	
Instructions for Building Straw Hut	2015	The Emperor of Water Clocks	
Latitudes	2001	Pleasure Dome	
Lime	2001	Talking Dirty to the Gods	
Moonshine	2001	Pleasure Dome	
Night Gigging	2013	"Night gigging". The New Yorker. 89 (7): 47. April 1, 2013.	
Please	2001	Pleasure Dome	
Poetics	2001	Pleasure Dome	
Praise Be	2015	The Emperor of Water Clocks	
Reflections	2001	Pleasure Dome	
Rock Me, Mercy	2015	The Emperor of Water Clocks	
Slam, Dunk, & Hook	2001	Pleasure Dome	
Slingshot	2016	"Slingshot". The New Yorker. 92 (22): 56–57. July 25, 2016.	
South Carolina Morning	2001	Pleasure Dome	
Toys in a Field	2001	Pleasure Dome	
Urban Renewal	2001	Pleasure Dome	
We Never Know	1988	Dien Cai Dau	
Yellow Dog Cafe	2001	Pleasure Dome	
Yellow Jackets	2001	Pleasure Dome	

Anthologies

- Ghost Fishing: An Eco-Justice Poetry Anthology, University of Georgia Press, 2018.

=== Essays ===
- Condition Red: Essays, Interviews, and Commentaries, edited by Radiclani Clytus, University of Michigan Press, 2017, ISBN 978-0-472-07344-3
- Blue Notes: Essays, Interviews, and Commentaries, edited by Radiclani Clytus Michigan, 2000, ISBN 978-0-472-09651-0
