= Van Thanh Rudd =

Australian artist (b.1973)

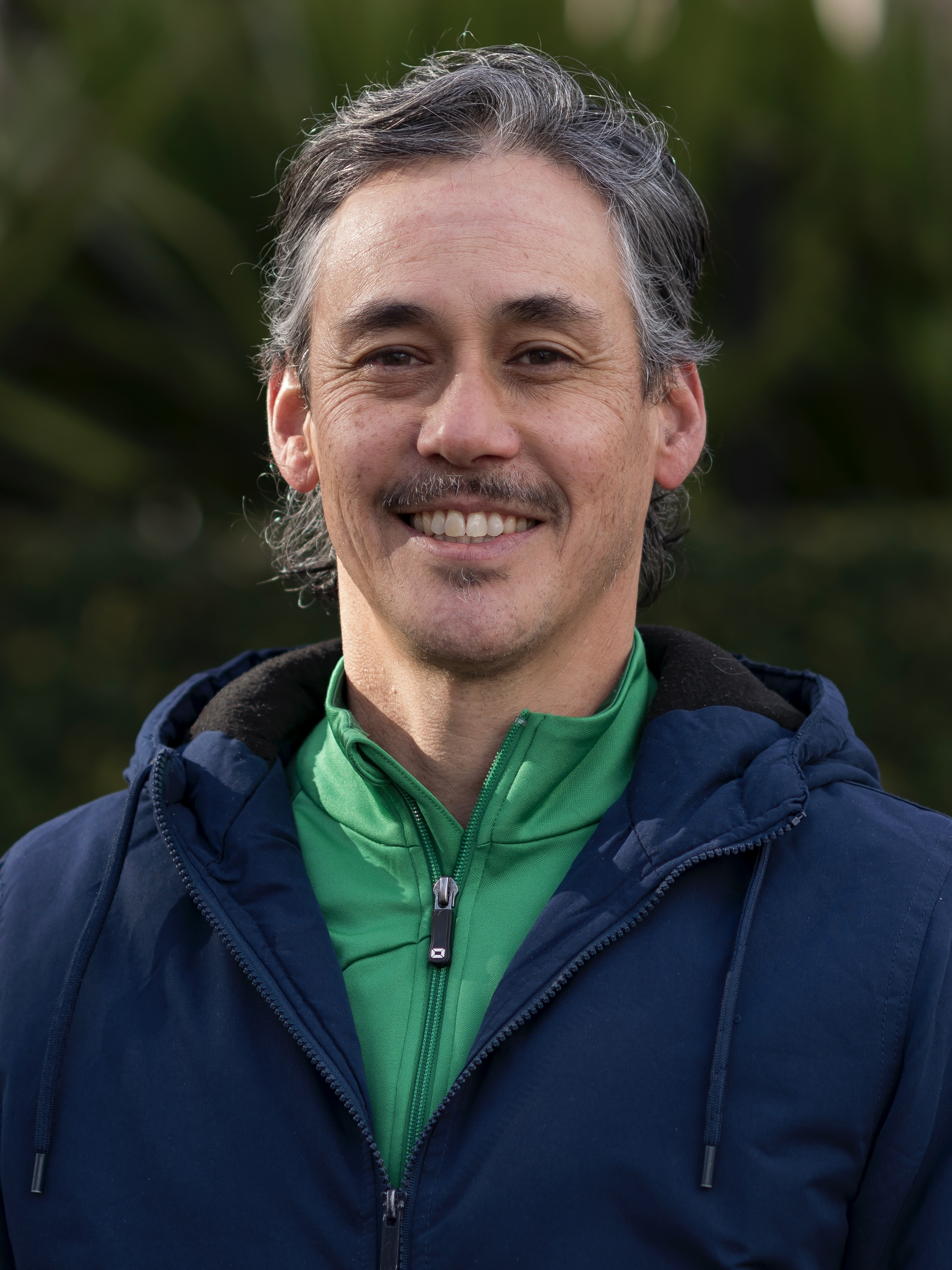
- Rudd in 2022
- Born: 1973 (age 52–53); Queensland, Australia
- Education: Victorian College of the Arts, RMIT University, Griffith University
- Known for: Contemporary art
- Political party: Victorian Socialists (2018–present)
- Other political affiliations: Revolutionary Socialist Party (2012–2013); Socialist Alternative (2013–present)
- Movement: Political satire, street art, conceptual art

Van Thanh Rudd (born 1973), also known as Van Nishing, is an Australian artist.

== Personal life ==
Rudd was born in Nambour, Queensland, to Vietnam veteran Malcolm Rudd and Tuoi. Rudd is the nephew of former Australian Prime Minister, Kevin Rudd.

Rudd resides in Footscray, Melbourne.

== Career ==
=== Artwork ===
In 2009, Rudd made an artwork critical of Connex Melbourne's parent company Veolia Environnement, which had won a contract to construct a light rail link from Jerusalem to Israeli settlements in the West Bank. The artwork was displayed at Platform Artists Group's public gallery, adjacent to Flinders Street station, a major railway station in Melbourne.

Rudd won the 2017 Crichton Award for his illustrations in Maxine Beneba Clarke's The Patchwork Bike.

In January 2020 Rudd was arrested when painting his mural of Nelligen RFS volunteer Paul Parker.

=== Anti-racism protest ===
On Australia Day 2010, Rudd and an associate were arrested and fined $200 for "inciting a riot".

=== Relationship with Kevin Rudd ===
In a 2010 interview on 3AW, Kevin Rudd told Neil Mitchell that he was not a fan of his nephew's political views but supported the notion of free speech in Australia. Rudd was the subject of an episode of ABC program Australian Story, broadcast in August 2010, which also reported his uncle had declined an invitation to appear.

=== Political career ===
Rudd contested the seat of Lalor for the House of Representatives in the 2010 federal election against Labor Prime Minister Julia Gillard on behalf of the unregistered Revolutionary Socialist Party. He garnered a total of 516 votes, which was 0.5% of the vote. Rudd claimed on an ABC radio interview his reason for running in the election was that the appointment of Gillard as PM marked "a more conservative path for Labor" and that she was "influenced by the mining magnates... [and] the conservative unions".

Rudd was the Victorian Socialists candidate for the seat of St Albans at the 2022 Victorian state election.
