= Elizabeth Alexander (businesswoman) =

Australian academic and accountant

Elizabeth Anne Alexander AO (born 16 April 1943), an Australian accountant and company director, was the 21st Chancellor of the University of Melbourne between 2011 and 2016.

== Biography ==
Alexander is a Fellow of the Society of Certified Practising Accountants, a Fellow of the Institute of Chartered Accountants in Australia, and a Fellow of the Australian Institute of Company Directors where she was a past national president. Alexander is a past national president of CPA Australia. She served as a non-executive director of CSL Limited for twenty years, including five as chairman; is a non-executive director of Dexus and Medibank Private; and has previously served on the boards of Boral, Amcor. The first woman in Australia to be appointed as a partner of one of the big eight accounting firms, Alexander specialised in the area of risk management and corporate governance issues, and was responsible for the establishment of these practices within Australia at PricewaterhouseCoopers. Alexander also served on government regulatory bodies including the Australian Prudential Regulation Authority, the Australian Takeovers Panel, and the Australian Financial Reporting Council.

In 2011, Alexander was appointed as Chancellor of the University of Melbourne and succeeded Alex Chernov, who was appointed as Governor of Victoria.

Alexander was appointed a Member of the Order of Australia in 1990 "In recognition of services to accountancy". She was appointed an Officer in the 2019 Queen's Birthday Honours for "distinguished service to higher education administration, to accounting and corporate governance, and as a role model."

Academic offices
Preceded by Alex Chernov	Chancellor of the University of Melbourne; 2011–2016	Succeeded by Allan Myers
