= Margaret Manion =

Australian art historian and curator (1935–2024)

Margaret Mary Manion AO FAHA (7 March 1935 – 3 September 2024) was an Australian art historian and curator recognised internationally for her scholarship on the art of the illuminated manuscript. She published on Medieval and Renaissance liturgical and devotional works, in particular, on Books of Hours – the Wharncliffe Hours, the Aspremont-Kievraing Hours, the Très Riches Heures. She was instrumental in cataloguing Medieval and Renaissance illuminated manuscripts in Australian and New Zealand collections. She was Herald Chair Professor of Fine Arts at the University of Melbourne from 1979 to 1995, also serving as Deputy Dean and Acting Dean in the Faculty of Arts, Associate Dean for Research, Pro-Vice-Chancellor from 1985 to 1988, and in 1987, the first woman to chair the university's Academic Board.

== Early life and education ==
Born in Nowra, New South Wales, Manion was educated at Loreto Convent, Normanhurst and subsequently became a member of the Loreto Sisters. She completed a Bachelor of Arts in Education and master's degree at the University of Melbourne, writing her thesis on the Wharncliffe Hours in the National Gallery of Victoria (1962). She researched the frescoes of San Giovanni a Porta Latina in Rome for her doctoral dissertation (1972) under the supervision of Charles Mitchell (1912–1995) at Bryn Mawr College, Pennsylvania.

== Career ==
In the 1960s Manion worked as a teacher, then as Principal of Loreto Abbey Mary's Mount, Ballarat (now Loreto College, Victoria). Between 1972 and 1978 Manion was a lecturer at the University of Melbourne, designated the second Herald Chair Professor of Fine Arts at the University of Melbourne in 1979 (until 1995), the first woman to be appointed to an established chair in the university. She also served as Deputy Dean and Acting Dean in the Faculty of Arts, Associate Dean for Research, and Pro-Vice-Chancellor from 1985 to 1988. She was the first woman to chair the Academic Board (1987–1988). Since 1995, Manion has been an emeritus Professor, and also Visiting Scholar at Newman College (University of Melbourne). An international conference was held in her honour in 2001, with a festschrift published the following year.

She was a foundation member for Australia of the Comité International d'Histoire de l'Art; a foundation member of the Società di Storia della Miniatura, Italy; and served for two terms as Foreign Advisor to the International Center of Medieval Art, New York. She was a Life Member of the National Gallery of Victoria, a member of the Council of Adult Education (1989–1994), the Arts Centre Melbourne Trust (1980–90), the Australia Council (1981–1984), and the Australian Tapestry Workshop, formerly the Victorian Tapestry Workshop (1992–2000).

=== Honours ===
Manion was elected a Fellow of the Australian Academy of the Humanities in 1986. She was a Life Member of the National Gallery of Victoria and an honorary curator of its collection of Early Medieval and Renaissance Art. She was a trustee of the National Gallery of Victoria for fifteen years and its Deputy President (1984–1990). In 2004, she was appointed Trustee emeritus of the National Gallery of Victoria in recognition of her continuing contribution to the Gallery. In 1989, Manion was appointed an Officer of the Order of Australia for her contribution to the arts and education. In 2001 she was awarded an Honorary doctorate from the University of Melbourne.

== Scholarship ==
Together with Vera Vines and Christopher de Hamel, Manion produced the first census of Medieval and Renaissance manuscripts in Australia (in 1984) and in New Zealand (in 1989). Between 2009 and 2012 Manion led an Australian Research Council Linkage Project, in conjunction with Shane Carmody, Bernard Muir and Toby Burrows, to create an on-line catalogue and digitisation of the twenty-seven manuscripts in the State Library of Victoria and other important collections in Victoria. This material subsequently was incorporated into the Europa Inventa database.

In 2005 she authored a scholarly study on the development of the illuminated book from the twelfth century to the advent of printing accompanied by detailed visual analysis of the Gospel Book of Theophanes, the Aspremont-Kievraing Hours, the Melbourne Livy, the Wharncliffe Hours, the Strozzi-Acciaioli Hours and a fragment of a Universal Chronicle, all in the collection of the National Gallery of Victoria. Manion was guest curator of The Medieval Imagination, an international exhibition at the State Library of Victoria between 28 March to 15 June 2008 of 91 illuminated manuscripts from Cambridge and British libraries and public collections in Australia and New Zealand, which attracted some 110,000 visitors.

Books and journals donated from Manion's research library form the core of the Medieval and Renaissance (Early Modern) Manuscript Studies Collection established at the Allan & Maria Myers Academic Centre, serving the communities of St Mary's College and Newman College, University of Melbourne.

== Death and legacy ==
Manion died on 3 September 2024, at the age of 88.

An exhibition, "Illuminating Minds", will be held at the University of Melbourne in February 2026 to honour Manion's contribution to the field of medieval and Renaissance manuscripts.

== Published works ==
=== As author ===
- M. M. Manion, V. F. Vines and C. de Hamel, Medieval and Renaissance Manuscripts in New Zealand Collections, London: Thames and Hudson, 1989.
- M. M. Manion and V. F. Vines, Medieval and Renaissance Illuminated Manuscripts in Australian Collections, London: Thames and Hudson, 1984.
- The Felton Illuminated Manuscripts in the National Gallery of Victoria, The National Gallery of Victoria and Macmillan Art Publishing, 2005.
- "Medieval and Renaissance Manuscripts in Australia: Resources, Research and Opportunities" [Special Issue: Transitus: Medieval and Renaissance Manuscripts in Australia and New Zealand eds., J. Lowry, M. Manion, and P. Spedding], Script & Print: Bulletin of the Bibliographical Society of Australia and New Zealand 32, no. 1 (2008), 7–20.
- "The Book and Church Services: Liturgy and Ritual"; "The Book and Knowledge: Science, Law, Literature and History", in The Medieval Imagination: Illuminated Manuscripts from Cambridge, Australia and New Zealand eds., B. Stocks and N. Morgan, Melbourne: Macmillan Art Publishing, 2008.
- "The Princely Patron and the Liturgy: Mass texts in the Grandes Heures of Philip the Bold and related Valois Books of Hours" in The Cambridge Illuminations. The Conference Papers, ed., S. Panayotova, London and Turnhout: Harvey Miller/Brepols, 2007, 193–203.
- "Imaging the Marvelous and fostering Marian Devotion: The Miracles de Notre Dame and French Royalty", in Tributes to Lucy Freeman Sandler: Studies in Illuminated Manuscripts, eds., K. A. Smith and C. Krinsky, London: Harvey Miller, 2007, 253–270.
- "Authentication, Theology and Narrative in the Gospel Book of Theophanes", Byzantine Narrative. Papers in Honour of Roger Scott, ed. J Burke and others, Australian Association for Byzantine Studies Byzantina Australiensia 16 (2006), 320–333.
- "The Angers Tapestries of the Apocalypse and Valois Patronage", in Proceedings of the 2000 Harlaxton Symposium: Prophecy, Apocalypse and the Day of Doom, ed., Nigel Morgan, Harlaxton Medieval Studies XII New Series, Paul Watkins Publishing, 2004, 220–238.
- "The Art of Illumination" Art on View 21 (Autumn 2000), 9–12.
- "The Early Illuminated Gospel Book" in Prayer and Spirituality in the Early Church, eds., P. Allen, W. Mayer and L. Cross, Centre for Early Christian Studies, Brisbane 1999, 155–171.
- "Women, Art, and Devotion: Three French Fourteenth-Century Royal Prayer Books" in The Art of the Book: Its Place in Medieval Worship, eds., M. M. Manion and B. J. Muir, University of Exeter Press, 1998, 21–66.
- "The Limbourg Brothers, Pol, Jean, Herman"; "The Très Riches Heures"; "The Master of the Cité des Dames"; "The Rohan Master"; "Maître François"; "Jacques de Besançon", in The MacMillan Dictionary of Art, London, 1996.
- "Psalter Illustration in the Très Riches Heures of Jean de Berry", Gesta (1995), 147–161.
- “Illustrated Hours of the Trinity for French Royalty” in Medieval Codicology, Iconography, Literature, and Translation: Studies for Keith Val Sinclair, eds., P. R. Monks and D.D.R. Owen, Leiden: E.J. Brill, 1994, 120–133.
- "The Codex Sancti Paschalis", La Trobe Journal, 51&52 (1993), 11–21.
- "Illuminating Words", National Gallery of Victoria Art Journal, 28 (1987), 17–33.
- The Wharncliffe Hours: A Fifteenth-century Illuminated Prayerbook in the Collection of the National Gallery of Victoria, Australia, London: Thames and Hudson, 1981
- The Wharncliffe Hours, Sydney University Press, 1972.

=== As editor ===
- An Illumination: The Rothschild Prayer Book and other works from the Kerry Stokes Collection c. 1280–1685 Freemantle: Australian Capital Equity, 2015.
- M. M. Manion and C. Zika, eds., Celebrating Word and Image 1250–1600: Illuminated Manuscripts from the Kerry Stokes Collection Freemantle: Australian Capital Equity, 2013.
- M. M. Manion and B. Muir, eds., The Art of the Book: Its Place in Medieval Worship, Exeter University Press, 1998; Second edition, 2006.
- M. M. Manion and B. Muir, eds., Medieval Texts and Images, Studies in Medieval Manuscripts, Melbourne and New York: Harwood Academic and Craftsman House, 1991.
