= The Choir of Newman College =

- Choir
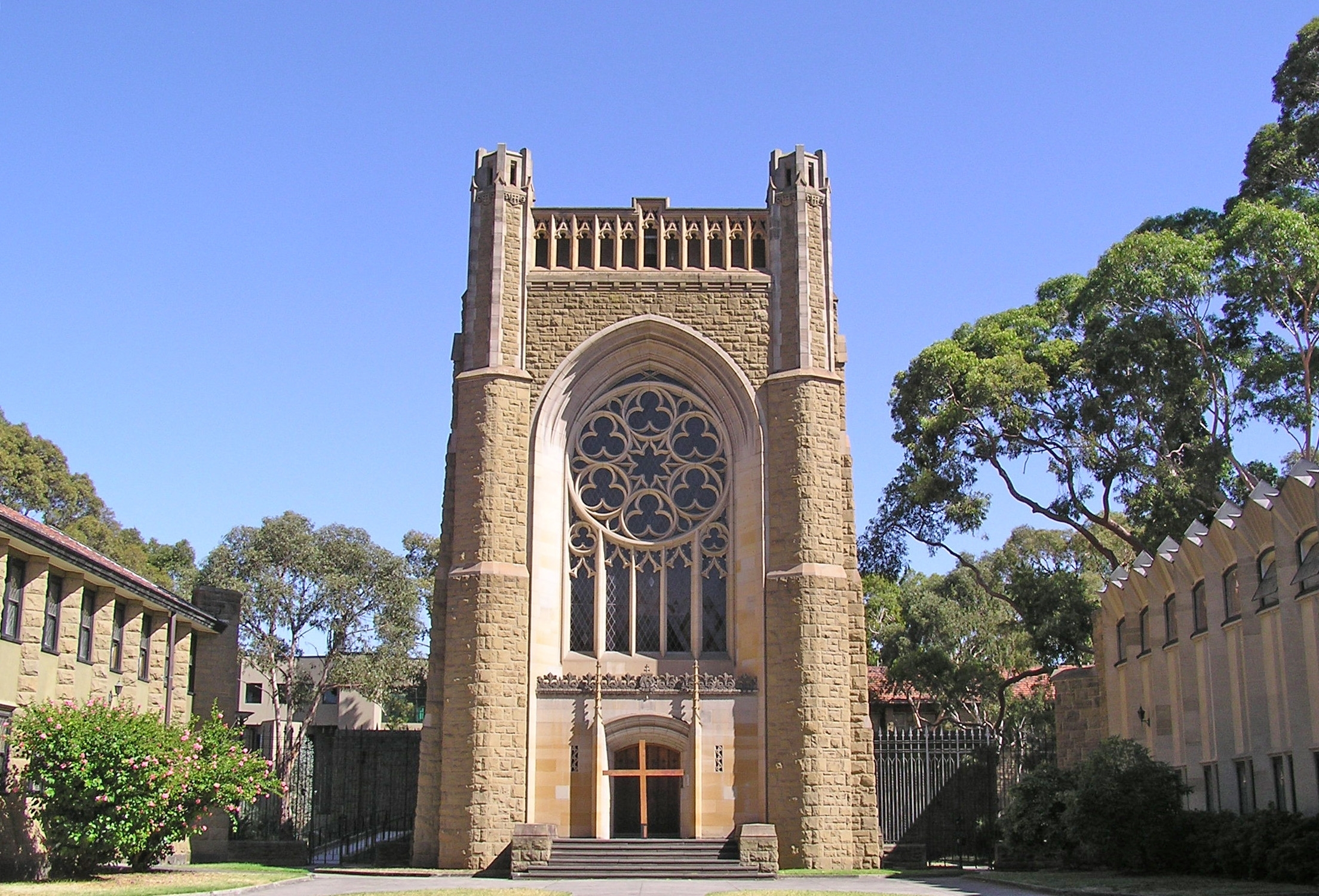
- Chapel of the Holy Spirit at Newman College
- Origin: Newman College
- Founded: 2002 (24 years ago)
- Founder: Dr. Gary Ekkel
- Website: Newman College Choir Website

The Choir of Newman College is a collegiate chapel and concert Choir affiliated with Newman College, a Catholic residential college of the University of Melbourne. Founded by Dr Gary Ekkel in 2002, the Choir consists of 27 choral scholars drawn predominantly from residents of the college and recent alumni. The Choir sings at a Choral Eucharist at 11am on Sundays during the University semester, as well as singing a Compline service on the first Thursday of each month.

== History ==
The Choir was established in 2002 under the Rectorship of Fr Peter L’Estrange when Dr Ekkel, who had previously worked with the choir of the nearby Ormond College, approached Newman College with the suggestion of forming a chapel and concert Choir. L’Estrange, a great patron of the Arts at Newman College, agreed and invited Dr Ekkel to form a collegiate choir to contribute to the liturgical and musical life of Newman College.

Since its inception in 2002, the repertoire of the Choir has predominantly focused on sacred music from the Renaissance and Baroque periods as well as 20th century music. Under the Rectorship of Fr Bill Uren, the Choir has transformed from being composed chiefly of non-resident scholars to being mostly resident scholars. Choral scholars of The Choir of Newman College have also gone on to perform in vocal ensembles such as Alchemy and Schola Cantorum as well as becoming founding members of The Regional Victorian Byrd Choir.

== Concerts and Tours ==
Typically, the Choir’s Concert Series consists of three concerts per year performed in the Chapel of the Holy Spirit at Newman College. However, the Choir also regularly sings outside of this concert series in festivals such as the Organs of the Ballarat Goldfields where it has performed major works such as Biber’s Missa Salisburgensis and Bach’s St Matthew Passion.

In 2015, the Choir embarked on its first international tour taking Monteverdi’s 1610 Vespers to the New Zealand cities of Auckland, Christchurch, Hamilton, Dunedin, and Oamaru. On this tour, the Choir collaborated with the New Zealand-based early music ensemble The Affetto Players.

== Recordings ==
In 2010, the Choir released its first album Behind Closed Doors with the Australian viol ensemble, Consort Eclectus, and the College Organist, David Macfarlane. This album showcases music written and sung by English Catholics during a period “dominated by a more or less consensual and emphatically Protestant regime”, which witnessed the persecution of Catholics and saw Catholic composers such as William Byrd “sail... close to the wind”

In 2018, as part of the centenary celebrations at Newman College, the Choir released the album Luceat Lux Vestra featuring music: set to texts written by the patron of the College, Cardinal John Henry Newman; tied to the Jesuit order who administer the College; and linked to the history and key figures of the College.

The Choir has also contributed to the CD Gallipoli: A Tribute, commissioned to commemorate the centenary of the ANZAC’s Gallipoli campaign.
