= Facing It =

Poem by Yusef Komunyakaa

"Facing It" is a poem by American poet and author Yusef Komunyakaa. It is a reflection on Komunyakaa's first visit to the Vietnam Veterans Memorial. Komunyakaa served in Vietnam and was discharged from the Army in 1966, during which time he wrote for army newspaper Southern Cross. It is the second poem written by Komunyakaa about Vietnam. R. S. Gwynn has referred to the poem as "the most poignant elegy that has been written about the Vietnam War."

== Background ==
The poem was his second to deal with the topic of the Vietnam War. He first wrote a poem dealing with Vietnam fourteen years after returning from the war. "Facing It" was written approximately a year after visiting the Vietnam Veterans Memorial. Komunyakaa has said "Facing It" influenced the other poems of the collection in which it was first published, Dien Cai Dau.

== Content ==
The poem concerns the speaker's visit to the Vietnam Veterans Memorial, a black gabbro wall engraved with the names of American soldiers who died in the war. The wall is polished so that it is reflective.

== Composition ==
Like jazz, the poem appears to be free of form, but it is in fact split into a verse-bridge-verse structure similar to many jazz songs. The first thirteen lines reflect on the speaker's reaction, and the final thirteen reflect on the reactions of others; these two sections are separated by a shorter section describing the act of finding and touching a name.

== Context ==
The poem is one of several by Vietnam veterans to deal with memorials. Andrew Palmer and Sally Minogue have contrasted the "ambivalent response" of "Facing It" with W. D. Ehrhart's "The Invasion of Grenada", in which the speaker rejects the idea of a Vietnam memorial and refuses to engage with "...that vast black wall of broken lives".

The poem has been anthologized in a number of collections, and is perhaps Komunyakaa's best known work.
