= Caroline Baum =

Australian journalist and broadcaster

Caroline Baum is an Australian journalist and radio and television broadcaster. She was the founding editor of Good Reading magazine.

== Early life and education ==
Born in London to migrant parents, Baum attended secondary school at the Lycée Français Charles de Gaulle, and studied philosophy and politics at the University of York.

== Career ==
On graduating, Baum worked as a writer and researcher for Time-Life Books on a 29-volume series of cook books called The Good Cook, before moving to the BBC, where she worked with Michael Parkinson and later worked for London Weekend Television on The South Bank Show.

She moved with her then-partner to Australia in 1985 and was married soon afterwards.

Baum was the founding editor of Good Reading magazine and worked as features editor for the Australian edition of Vogue. She was also the long-term presenter of the ABCTV book program Between the Lines until the program ended in 1998 and worked as an executive producer with ABC Radio National.

In 1995, Baum took leave from the ABC, working as a researcher / producer on The World on a Plate, a history of food around the world and in 2006, produced and co-wrote her first TV documentary, about Australian writer Arthur Upfield, shown on SBS TV.

Until recently Baum was editorial director of Booktopia, Australia's largest online bookseller. She curates and hosts talks, blogging for arts organisations, and providing media consultancy. She has also designed a collection of rugs based on her photographic images for Designer Rugs. In 2018 Baum was Reader in Residence at the State Library of New South Wales.

Caroline's first book, Only: A Singular Memoir, was published in March 2017. It is the story of her unconventional childhood and explores what it means to be an only child—as both child and adult. Also what it means to be the daughter of two people damaged by trauma and tragedy, particularly a domineering and explosive father. Secrets are revealed and differences settled.

== Bibliography ==
- Baum, Caroline and Carter, Earl (1989) 'Artists of the Australian Ballet' Sydney:Waterford Wedgwood Australia Ltd.,
- Baum, Caroline and McGuinness, Jan (1996) 'New York Stories' Sydney: Australian Broadcasting Corporation with Village Roadshow Pictures; VHS video
- Aplin, Brett; Baum, Caroline; Bell, Janet; Matthews, Lisa; Steininger, Karin; (2007) 'In search of Bony'. Eight Mile Plains, Qld: Marcom Projets; DVD video
