= Foreign Soil =

2014 collection of short fiction by Maxine Beneba Clarke

- Author: Maxine Beneba Clarke
- Cover artist: Allison Colpoys
- Language: English
- Published: 2014
- Publisher: Hachette
- Publication place: Australia
- Pages: 272
- Awards: Victorian Premier's Unpublished Manuscript Award; ABIA for Best Literary Fiction; Indie Award for Best Debut Fiction
- ISBN: 9780733632426
- OCLC: 931590129
- Dewey Decimal: 823.914
- LC Class: PR9619.3.C46

Foreign Soil is a collection of short fiction by Maxine Beneba Clarke published in 2014 by Hachette. It won the 2013 Victorian Premier's Unpublished Manuscript Award, the 2015 ABIA for Best Literary Fiction, the 2015 Indie Award for Best Debut Fiction, and was shortlisted for the 2015 Stella Prize.
