= Zahra Newman =

Australian actress

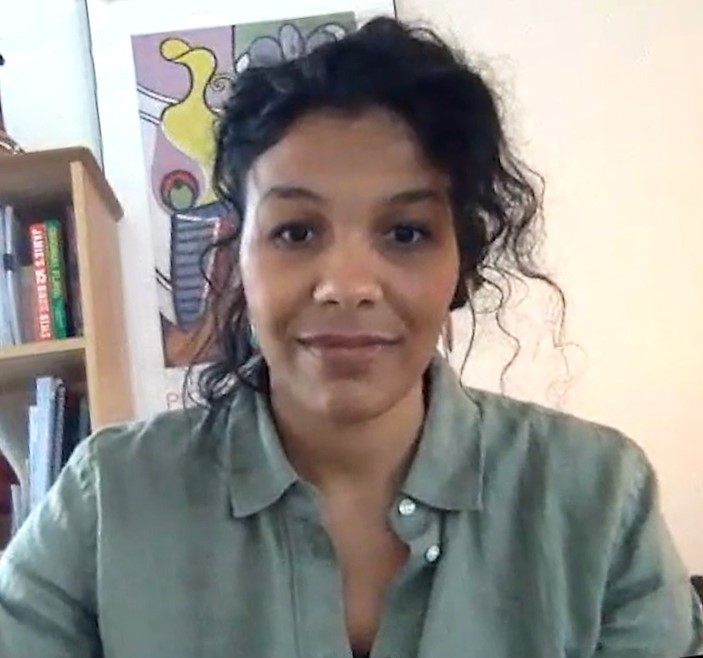
Newman in 2021

Zahra Newman is a Jamaica-born Australian actress.

== Early life and education ==
Zahra Newman was born in Jamaica. She migrated to Australia at the age of 14 with her mother.

She graduated from the Victorian College of the Arts in 2008.

== Career ==
=== Stage ===
Newman appeared as Nabalungi in the original Australian cast of The Book of Mormon.

She has performed extensively with leading theatre companies in Melbourne and Sydney. Her theatre credits include Miss Julie, The Effect, The Mountaintop, The Cherry Orchard, Clybourne Park, The Drowsy Chaperone, Richard III and Rockabye for Melbourne Theatre Company; Rosalind in As You Like It for Bell Shakespeare; The Blind Giant is Dancing, Ivanov and Private Lives for Belvoir; Love and Information for Malthouse Theatre and Sydney Theatre Company; The Government Inspector for Belvoir and Malthouse Theatre; and Random for the Sydney Opera House, Melbourne Theatre Company and Brisbane Powerhouse. She appeared in the original Australian cast of the musical An Officer and A Gentleman.

In August 2023, Newman appeared alongside Bert La Bonté in Fences. In October 2023 she played music legend Billie Holiday in Lady Day at Emerson's Bar and Grill.

In 2024, Newman played all 23 characters in Sydney Theatre Company's Dracula.

=== Screen ===
Newman's television and film credits include Wentworth, Rush, Childhood's End, and Neighbours.

In 2026 she plays DSS Isabel Pena in the Apple TV+ drama series Last Seen, originally titled The Dispatcher.

== Filmography ==
=== Film ===
Year	Title	Role	Notes	Ref
2012	Hold	Lily	Short film	
2015	Truth	Dana Roberson		
2020	I Met a Girl	Olivia		
2021	Long Story Short	Leanne	Feature film	
2022	Thirteen Lives	Olivia Taft		
2023	Our Haunt	Abby	Short	
2024	Addition		Film	

=== Television ===
Year	Title	Role	Notes	Ref
2010	Rush	Kara Davidson	2 episodes	
2015	Childhood's End	Bridget Rodricks	Episode: "The Overlords"	
2016	Comedy Showroom	Fran Wright	Episode: "Bleak"	
2017	Wentworth	Iman Farah	5 episodes	
2017	Sisters	Felicity	4 episodes	
2019	Diary of an Uber Driver	Beck	6 episodes	
2020	Rosehaven	Amy	2 episodes	
2020–2021	Neighbours	Audrey Hamilton	Recurring character	
2021	Spreadsheet	Helena	8 episodes	
2022	Pieces of Her	Sgt Wilson	2 episodes	
2023	Erotic Stories	Lelia	1 episode (Imperfect Paw Paw)	
2024-25	Austin	Monica	3 episodes	
2026	Last Seen	Isabel Pena	TV series	

== Theatre credits ==
Year	Title	Role	Notes	Ref
2024	Dracula	Various	Sydney Theatre Co	
2024	The Hate Race	Maxine	Sydney Theatre Co	
2023	Lady Day at Emerson's Bar and Grill	Billie Holiday	Melbourne	
2023	Fences	Rose Maxon	Sydney Theatre Co	
2022	A Raisin in the Sun	Ruth Younger	Sydney Theatre Co	
2021	Girl From North Country	Marianne Lane		
2019-20	Wake in Fright	John Grant	Sydney Theatre Co / Malthouse	
2019	Cat on a Hot Tin Roof	Maggie	Sydney Theatre Co	
2018	random	Various	Belvoir St	
2016	The Mill on the Floss	Maggie		
2016	Miss Julie	Kristin	Sydney Theatre Co	
2012	An Officer and a Gentleman	Seegar		

== Awards and nominations ==
In 2014, Newman was nominated for Helpmann Awards for both Best Female Actor in Play for The Mountaintop and Best Female Actor in a Supporting Role in a Play for The Government Inspector. She received a Green Room Award for Female Actor for Random in 2012.
