= The Hate Race =

2016 book by Maxine Beneba Clarke

- Author: Maxine Beneba Clarke
- Genre: Memoir
- Publisher: Hachette Book Group
- Publication date: 9 August 2016
- Publication place: Australia
- Pages: 272
- ISBN: 9780733632280

The Hate Race is a 2016 memoir by Maxine Beneba Clarke. The book explores Clarke's experiences growing up Black in Australia during the 1980s and 1990s. It was the winner of the 2017 Multicultural NSW Award at the New South Wales Premier's Literary Awards and was shortlisted for the 2017 Stella Prize. The memoir was adapted into a play, which was staged at the Malthouse Theatre in a 2024 production starring Zahra Newman.

== Publication history ==
The Hate Race was published in Australia by Hachette in August 2016. The book was slated for publication in the United States by an imprint of Simon & Schuster until Clarke withdrew it from US publication after finding out that the imprint was also set to publish a work by alt-right figure Milo Yiannopoulos. Clarke explained her decision by saying, "It's a book about hate speech; how could I let them publish it?".

== Reception ==
The Hate Race received generally positive reviews. In The Sydney Morning Herald, Fiona Wright described Clarke's voice as powerful and unlike anything else in Australian literature, but wrote that the book featured a degree of unevenness and inconsistency. In The Australian, Beejay Silcox praised Clarke's poetic prose and use of humour, while writing that the book could have benefited from a greater exploration of its historical context. A review in The Monthly suggested that the book would spur a timely conversation about racism in Australian society.

== Theatre adaptation ==
A theatre adaptation of the book, also written by Clarke, was performed at the Malthouse Theatre in February 2024. The adaptation was performed as a one-woman show starring Zahra Newman and was directed by Courtney Stewart and Tariro Mavondo. It received a four-star review in The Guardian, which praised the simplicity of the staging and the show's use of humour. A review in ABC News praised the show's humour and Newman's performance. The show received a five-star review in Time Out, which highlighted the show's balancing of "joy, humour and pain". Clarke said in an interview that she hoped that the play would help Australians learn to recognise direct and indirect racism, and that it would validate the experiences of those who had experienced discrimination themselves.

== Awards ==
Awards for The Hate Race
Year	Award	Category	Result	Ref.
2018	Nita Kibble Literary Awards	Nita B Kibble Literary Award	Shortlisted	
2017	Stella Prize	—	Shortlisted	
2017	Victorian Premier's Literary Awards	Victorian Premier's Prize for Nonfiction	Shortlisted	
2017	New South Wales Premier's Literary Awards	NSW Multicultural Award	Won	
2017	Australian Book Industry Awards	Biography Book of the Year	Shortlisted	
2017	Indie Book Awards	Non-Fiction Book Award	Shortlisted	
