= St Mary's College, Melbourne (residential college) =

St Mary's College, University of Melbourne
- University of Melbourne
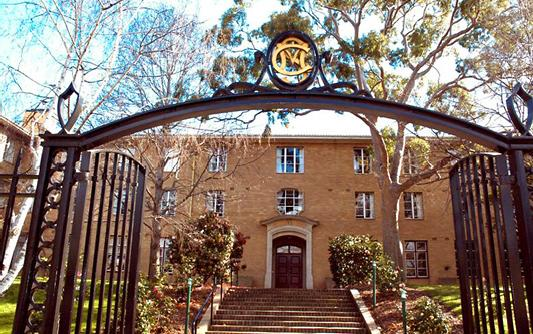
- The front gate of St Mary's College

- Shield of the college
- Location: 871 Swanston Street, Parkville, Melbourne, Victoria, Australia
- Coordinates: 37°47′46″S 144°57′50″E
- Motto: Latin: Ut Testimonium Perhibeam Veritati
- Motto in English: That I may bear witness to the truth (John 18:38)
- Founder: Sisters of Loreto
- Established: 1918; 108 years ago
- Named for: Mary (mother of Jesus)
- Former names: St Mary's Hall
- Colours: Navy blue and red
- Principal: Dr Darcy McCormack
- Undergraduates: 161
- Postgraduates: 8
- Tutors: 8
- Website: St Mary's College website

St Mary's College is a medium-sized Roman Catholic co-educational residential college affiliated with the University of Melbourne. Founded in 1918, St Mary's was the first Roman Catholic residential college for women at an Australian university. From its humble origins of just ten students, the college is today home to approximately 160 undergraduate and several postgraduate students during the university year.

== Location ==
The college is located on the corner of Tin Alley and Swanston Street in Parkville, a suburb of Melbourne.

== History ==
St Mary's College was originally established as St Mary's Hall in 1918, catering to women primarily from country Victoria, and directly affiliated with the nearby male-only Newman College. Formerly housed in a stately home on the Avenue in Parkville known as 'Barbiston', the college moved to its present location in 1966. It was in that year, following the approval of Archbishop Daniel Mannix, that it became independent - a college in its own right - under the leadership of Mother Francis Frewin. A renowned educationalist with a great love of English and French literature, Mother Frewin was a noted art expert and established the college's excellent fine art collection, as well its comprehensive academic library, before her retirement in 1969.

In 1977, St Mary's became co-educational, seeing its first male president of the student body elected in 1980. In 1993, the college celebrated its 75th anniversary with a weekend of celebrations, including a ball in the Great Hall of the National Gallery of Victoria and a garden party in the presence of the Vice-Chancellor of the University of Melbourne, Dr David Pennington AC.

For 96 years, from its foundation until 2013, the college was administered by the Sisters of Loreto, whose spiritual charism and educational philosophy remains a guiding force in the college's mission today. Today, the leadership and governance of the college is the responsibility of the Catholic Archdiocese of Melbourne and the Catholic Bishops of the Country dioceses of Victoria in cooperation with the College Council, who appoint a Principal. The incumbent Principal is Dr Darcy McCormack.

In 2004, the Alan & Maria Myers Academic Centre, a joint facility shared between St Mary’s and Newman College, was opened. It was designed by Maggie Edmond and Peter Corrigan to reflect the overall academic vision of both colleges to merge and enhance the educational facilities and opportunities available to the students of the University's Roman Catholic colleges. The centre contains a library, tutorial rooms, music practice rooms, student lounges and information technology facilities. It also houses the college's art collection which was for many years curated and managed by the internationally renowned art historian, and College alumna, Sr Margaret Manion AO FAHA.

== Student body ==
It is home to approximately 160 students, the majority of whom are undergraduate students attending the University of Melbourne, although a very small percentage also attend either the Australian Catholic University, Monash University, Parkville campus, or RMIT University.

The St Mary's College Student Club (to which all members of the student body belong) is a self-governing incorporated organisation which runs day-to-day social, cultural and academic events during term time in the college.

The majority of students at St Mary's are from rural and regional Victoria, others from Melbourne, and some are interstate or international students.

The college has a very strong sporting tradition, particularly in the disciplines of Australian rules football and netball. Its official colours are navy blue and red. In 2016 the St Mary's Women's Rowing VIII rowed their way to a drought-breaking victory in the second division, the first win since 1962. This victory was repeated in 2017.
