= Maria Myers =

Australian philanthropist

Maria Myers AC
- Occupation(s): Businesswoman, philanthropist
- Spouse: Allan Myers

Maria Josephine Myers AC (née Jens) is an Australian philanthropist, and advocate for the rock art of the indigenous Australians of the Kimberley region. She is married to Allan Myers.

Myers holds the position of Chairman of the Kimberley Foundation Australia; director of the Australian String Quartet (since 2002), and commercial organisations. She is also a member of the State Library of Victoria Foundation Council (since 2007), Loreto College Ballarat School Council (since 2010) and a member of St Mary's College Council, University of Melbourne. She previously served on the board of the Burnet Institute (2004–2011).

Myers was appointed Companion of the Order of Australia in the Australia Day Honours, 2016, "for eminent service to the community through philanthropic leadership in support of major visual and performing arts, cultural, education, and not-for-profit organisations, and to the advancement of the understanding of Indigenous rock art". She was appointed Officer of the Order of Australia in 2007.
