= Peter L'Estrange =

Australian historian and Jesuit

- Education: St Aloysius' College, BA (Hons) Melbourne University BD Melbourne College of Divinity, DPhil Oxford University
- Occupations: Priest; historian; university administrator

Peter John L'Estrange, AO is an Australian Jesuit priest and historian. He was the Master of Campion Hall at the University of Oxford in England from 2006 to 2008.

== Early life and education ==
Pierre L'Estrange was educated at St Aloysius' College, Sydney. In 1966, he was both school captain and dux, the title conferred on the boy achieving the highest marks in public examinations. From 1981 to 1983, he was the Roman Catholic chaplain to the University of Queensland.

He undertook graduate study at Campion Hall, Oxford and in 1991 was awarded the degree of Doctor of Philosophy (DPhil) for his thesis, The nineteenth-century British Jesuits, with special reference to their relations with the vicars apostolic and the bishops.

== Career ==
From 1991 until 2006, he was Rector of Newman College, University of Melbourne. He was Master of Campion Hall, Oxford 2006 – 2008 and then worked at Georgetown University in Washington, D.C., before returning to Australia in 2013, taking up residence in Canberra.

He is also an Honorary Fellow of Mannix College, Monash University.

== Sources and further information ==
- Peter L'Estrange new master of Campion Hall, Oxford, Australian Jesuits
- University of Oxford Annual Review 2005/06
- This is Oxfordshire: CommuniGate: Campion Hall (Jesuits)
- Mannix College Fellows and Tutors
- Roman Catholic Chaplaincy at the University of Queensland
- St Aloysius' College Old Boys' Newsletter
- https://web.archive.org/web/20100302151624/http://www.catholic-chaplaincy.org.uk/history/list-of-chaplains
