= Newman College, Melbourne =

Australian Roman Catholic college

Newman College
- University of Melbourne
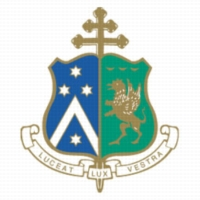
- Location: 887 Swanston St, Parkville, Victoria, Melbourne
- Coordinates: 37.7950°S 144.9636°E
- Motto: Luceat Lux Vestra
- Motto in English: Let Your Light Shine
- Established: 1918
- Architect: Walter Burley Griffin; Marion Mahony Griffin
- Architectural style: Art Deco
- Colours: Blue, Green and White
- Gender: Co-educational
- Rector: Daniel Madigan SJ
- Provost: Guglielmo Gottoli
- Undergraduates: 225
- Postgraduates: 55
- Website: newman.unimelb.edu.au

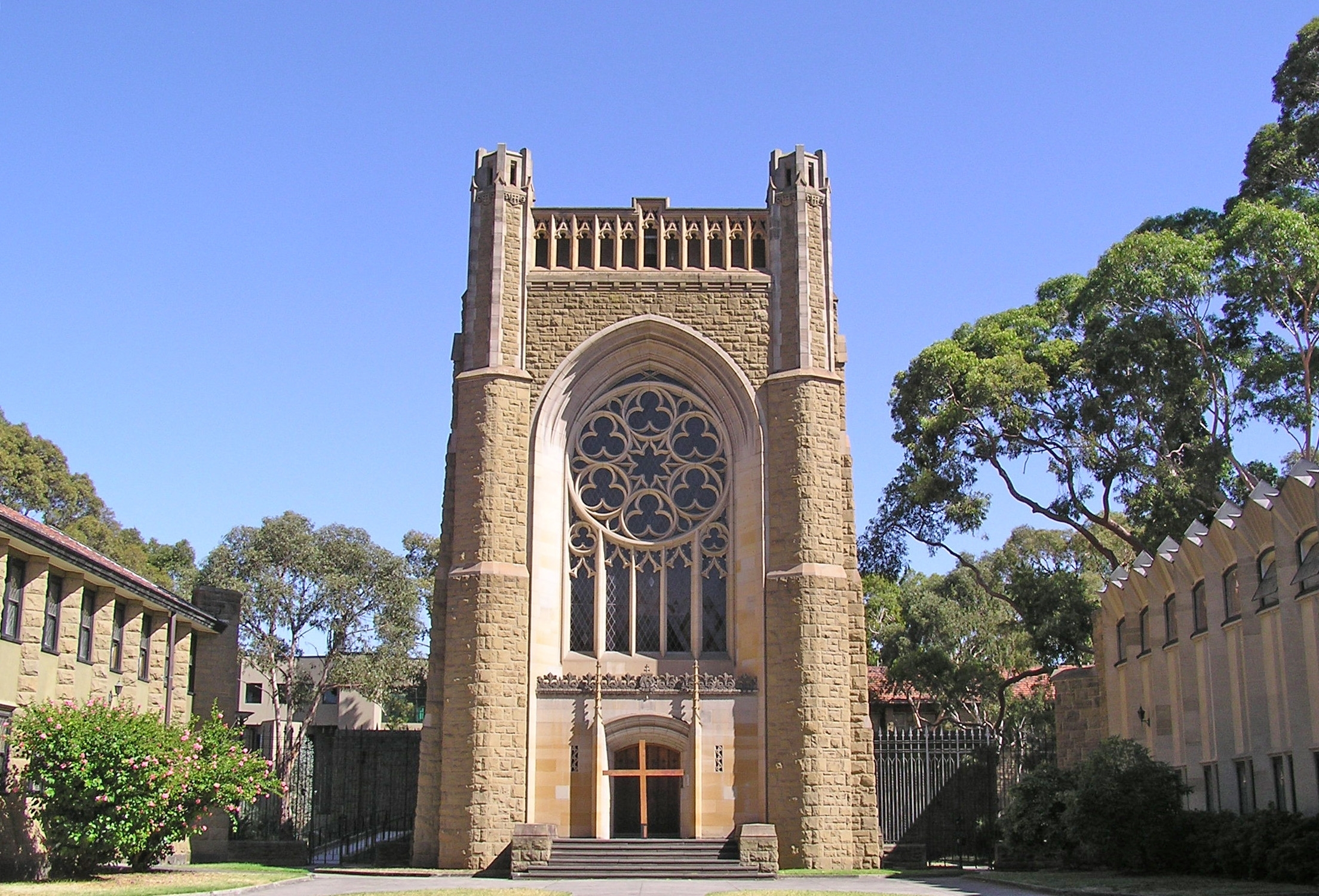
Newman College Chapel

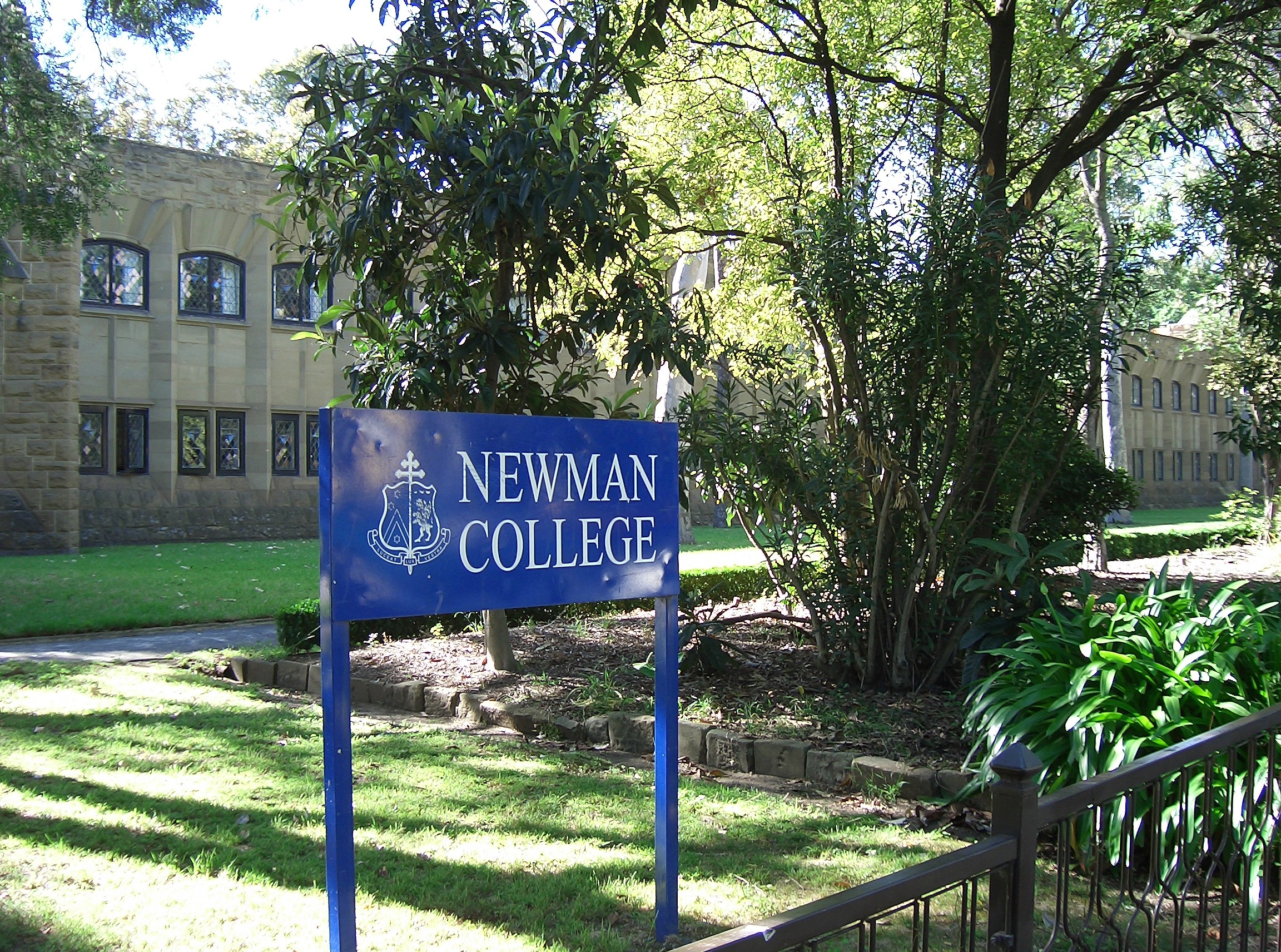
The Mannix wing faces Swanston Street

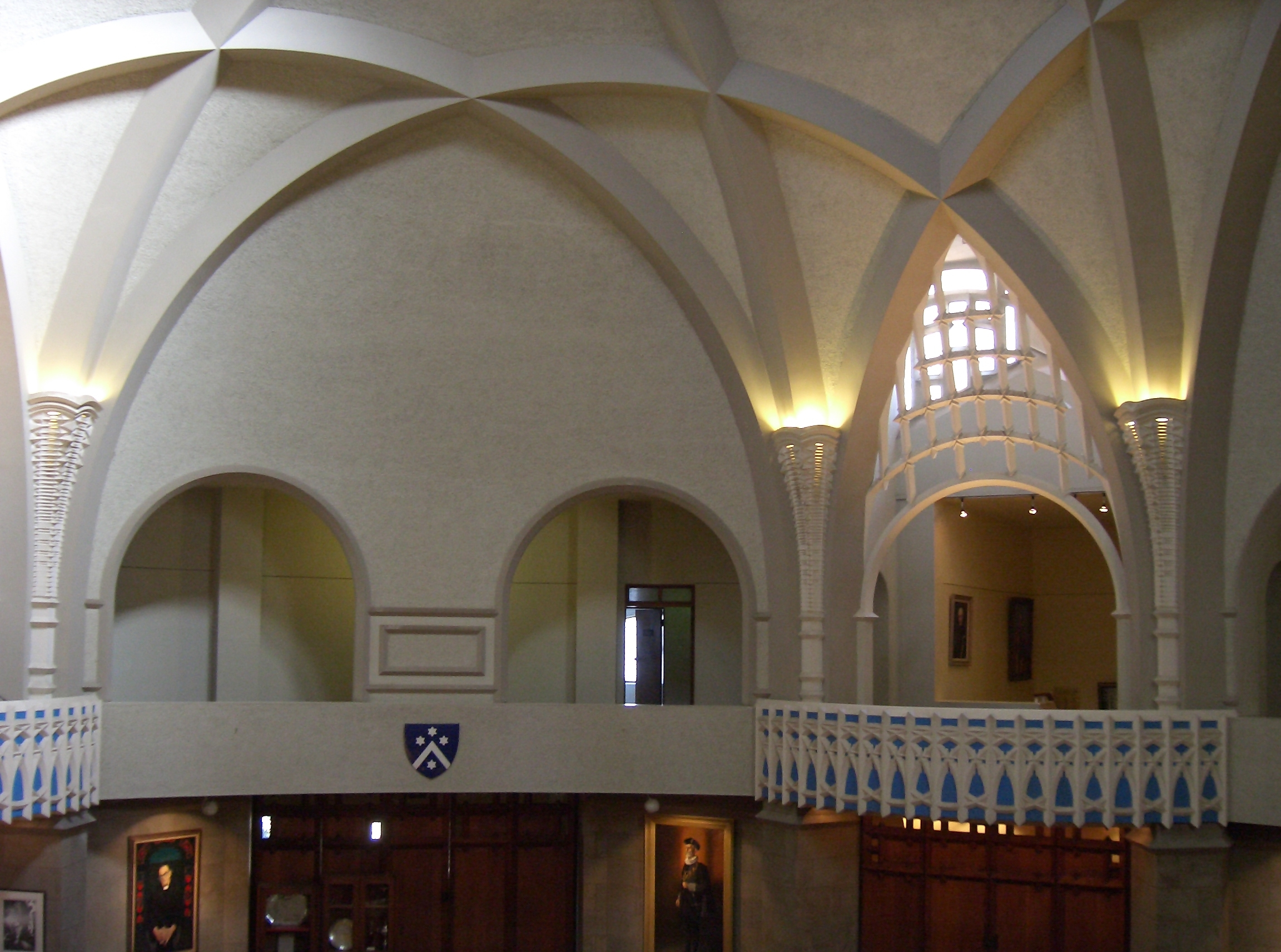
Interior of the dining room

Newman College is an Australian Roman Catholic co-educational residential college affiliated with the University of Melbourne. It houses about 225 undergraduate students and about 55 postgraduate students and tutors.

The college is named after John Henry Newman, a former Anglican and major figure in the Oxford Movement who became a Catholic in the 19th century. Although affiliated with the University of Melbourne, a small number of students attend the Australian Catholic University, RMIT University and Monash University's Parkville campus.

The college motto is Luceat Lux Vestra, translated from Latin as "Let Your Light Shine".

== Student life ==
=== Facilities ===
The majority of undergraduates live in the Carr and Mannix wings, which flank the domed dining room and are connected by a parapet. Undergraduates also live in the balcony rooms in Donovan wing, and in Fleming House at 950 Swanston St. Graduate students are accommodated in a variety of terrace houses opposite the college on Swanston St and in self-contained apartments behind the Donovan wing.

=== Students' Club ===
All undergraduate members of Newman College are accepted into the Newman College Students' Club, a self-governing incorporated organisation which runs day-to-day and special events in the college. A general committee is elected annually. The portfolios include vice-president, secretary, community service, culture, equity and female and male sports representatives.

=== Postgraduates ===
All members of the college administration, as well as tutors, academics in residence and postgraduate students (and some senior undergraduate students), comprise the Senior Common Room (SCR). Like the Students' Club, the SCR annually elect a president, secretary and treasurer, among other portfolios, to organise several events throughout the year.

=== Co-curricular activities ===
The college places a strong emphasis on participation in co-curricular activities, with music, sport and the dramatic arts playing a large role in life at Newman. Soirées are held many times throughout the year, showcasing the talents of the students, with the Peter L'Estrange SJ Prize awarded to the best performing artist in college. The Michael Scott SJ Prize is the annual art competition. The Albert Power SJ Medallion for Debating is named after Newman's second rector, Albert Power SJ. The Choir of Newman College, established in 2002, is a chapel and concert choir.

Newman has a strong sporting culture, having won more than half of the intercollegiate football premierships ever played. The college is also a strong participant in intercollegiate art, music and culture events, winning the 2022 Intercollegiate Culture Cup.

== Scholarships and bursaries ==
Newman awards financial aid in the form of scholarships and bursaries to around 75% of residents. Scholarships are awarded to both domestic and international students, of total value of up to $10,000.

Newman applicants may also apply for the University of Melbourne Residential College Access Scholarship, which supports Indigenous students and regional students from a disadvantaged financial background to stay in college during their degree.

== Public seminars ==
The college hosts regular Irish studies seminars which are open to the public.

=== Archbishop Daniel Mannix Memorial Lecture ===
The Archbishop Daniel Mannix Memorial Lecture, formerly referred to as the Daniel Mannix Memorial Lecture, or simply Mannix Memorial Lecture, was started by the Students' Club in 1977 and is a highlight of the university and college calendar. It is named in honour of the third Archbishop of Melbourne, Daniel Mannix, who was a driving force behind the formation of the college and for improving the opportunities of Catholic students.

The second lecture, by Sir Zelman Cowen, also marked the occasion of the 60th anniversary of the foundation of Newman College. His lecture was later republished as a book on Sir Isaac Isaacs by Melbourne University Press in 1979. Similarly, Sir Bernard Callinan's lecture was later published as a book on Sir John Monash.

Past lecturers have included Malcolm Fraser, Kim Beazley, Sir Joh Bjelke-Petersen, Patrick Dodson, Ita Buttrose, Sir Gustav Nossal, Alexander Downer, Manning Clark, Peter Garrett, Christine Nixon, Justice Alastair Nicholson and Tanya Plibersek.

Year	Speaker	Topic
1977	Bartholomew Augustine Santamaria	Archbishop Mannix and his contribution to the art of public leadership in Australia
1978	Sir Zelman Cowen	Sir Isaac Isaacs
1979	Sir Paul Hasluck	Sir Robert Menzies and his contribution to the art of public leadership in Australia
1980	Sir Bernard Callinan	Sir John Monash
1981	Ranald Macdonald	David Syme
1982	Dr Philip Law	Sir Douglas Mawson
1983	Sir Ninian Stephen	Chief Justice Higinbotham
1984	Professor Leonie Kramer	James McAuley
1985	Professor Manning Clark	Rt. Hon. John Curtin
1986	Patrick McCaughey	Fred Williams
1987	Rt. Hon. Malcolm Fraser	Sir Robert Menzies: in search of balance
1988	Rt. Hon. Sir Harry Gibbs	Sir Samuel Griffith
1989	Ita Buttrose	Mother Mary MacKillop
1990	Sir Joh Bjelke-Petersen	Sir Henry Bolte
1991	John Ralph	Sir Maurice Mawby
1992	Peter Garrett	Dr H.C. 'Nugget' Coombs
1994	Hon. Alexander Downer	The Constitutional Forefathers
1995	Hon. Gareth Evans	Rt. Hon. Dr H. V. Evatt
1996	Patrick Dodson	Paddy Djiagween
1998	Sir Gustav Nossel	Sir Frank McFarlane Burnett
1999	Hon. Kim Beazley	Hon. Gough Whitlam
2000	Maj. General Peter Cosgrove	Lt. Gen. Sir Leslie Morshead
2001	Dr. Peter Hollingworth	Fr. Gerard Tucker
2002	Hon. John Button	Imagining Leadership
2004	Rev. Tim Costello	Professor Manning Clark
2005	John Lewis	Man, Leadership and Machine
2006	Waleed Aly	Michael Long: Sport and Public Leadership
2007	Julian Burnside	Leading the Wrong Way
2008	Sir James Gobbo	Caroline Chisholm and Profiles in Leadership
2009	Hon. Alastair Nicholson	A Failure in Leadership? A Reluctance to Enforce Human Rights Requirements in Australia
2010	Susan Crennan	Recollections of Daniel Mannix and Vincent Buckley
2011	Christine Nixon APM	Leadership in Challenging Times
2012	Hon. Barry Jones AO	Gough Whitlam in context: a revisionist exercise
2013	Hon. John Brumby	Federation - The Power and the Promise
2015	Michael McGirr	Peter Steele - Priest, Poet and Inspiration
2016	Hon. Kevin Andrews	Joseph Lyons
2018	Gabi Hollows	The life and legacy of Fred Hollows
2022	Tanya Plibersek	Contemporary Australian politics and political leadership
2025	Hon. Malcolm Turnbull AC	Defending Australia’s Democracy in a Might-Is-Right World

== Endowed chairs ==
Newman College hosts a number of endowed chairs at the University of Melbourne. They include the Gerry Higgins Chair of Irish Studies, the Gerry Higgins Lecturer in Philosophy, the Gerry Higgins Lecturer in Medieval Art History, the Gerry Higgins Lecturer in Shakespeare Studies and the Gerry Higgins Chair of Positive Psychology.

== Buildings ==
Newman College
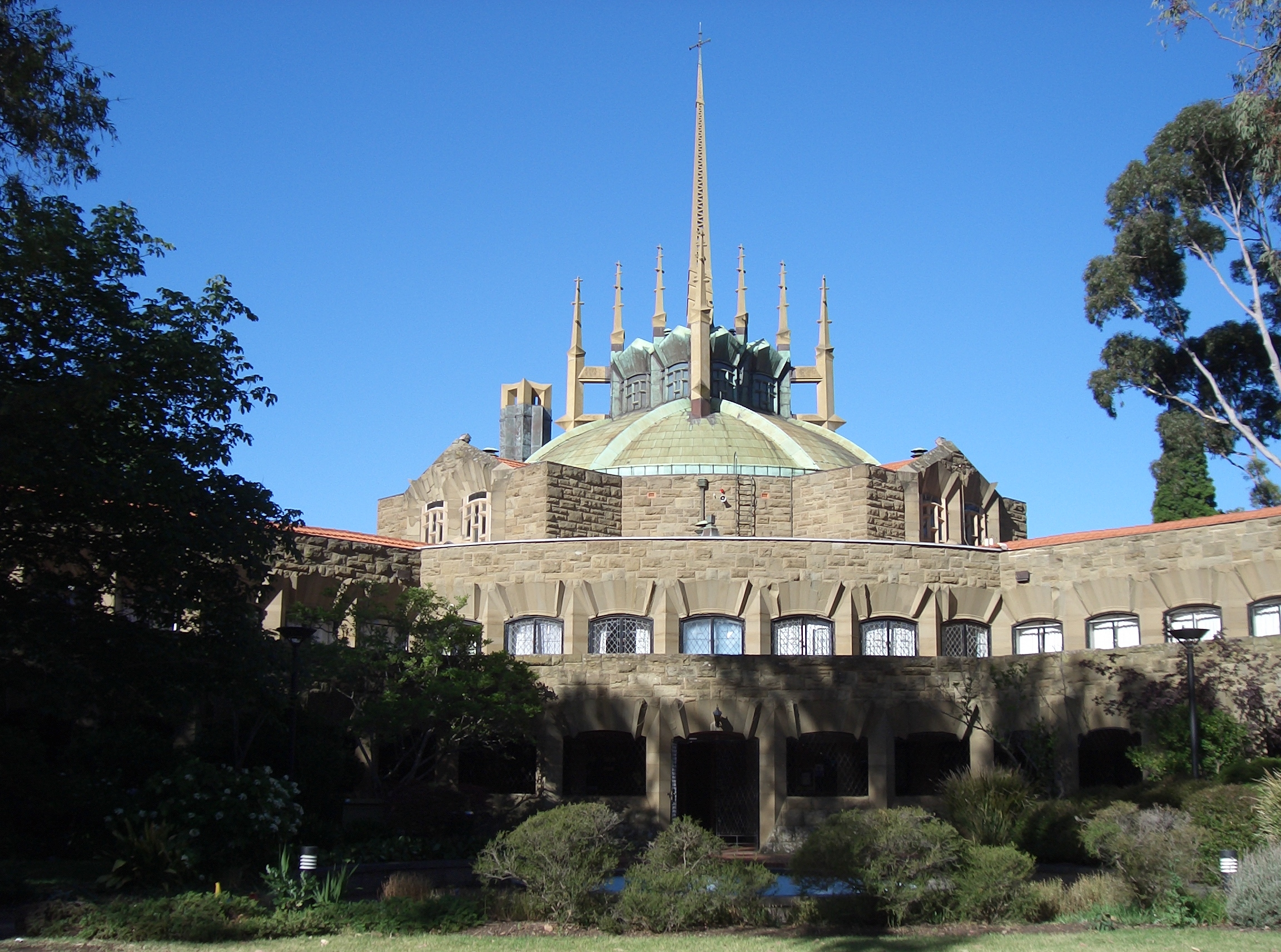
- Dining room façade
- Former names: Roman Catholic College

General information
- Type: Residential college
- Architectural style: Gothic Revival Chicago influence
- Location: 887 Swanston Street, Parkville, Melbourne, Australia
- Construction started: April 1916
- Completed: March 1918
- Owner: Roman Catholic Trusts Corporation

Design and construction
- Architects: Walter Burley Griffin; Marion Mahony Griffin
- Main contractor: Bart Moriarty
- Awards: Australian Institute of Architects (Victorian Chapter) Heritage Architecture Award 2010
- Designations: Register of the National Estate (1978); Australian National Heritage List (2005); National Trust of Australia; Melbourne City Council Heritage Register; RAIA National Register of Twentieth Century Architecture; Victorian Heritage Register

The original set of campus buildings were built during 1916 to 1918 and were designed by American architects Walter Burley Griffin and Marion Mahony Griffin. The Burley Griffins also designed furniture for the college, including distinctive chairs, tables and bookshelves for the dining room and the original bedrooms of the college. Much of this furniture remains in day-to-day use at the college, but some of it has found its way into various art galleries and private collections. This was recognised by its inclusion on the Australian National Heritage List on 21 September 2005, citing "one of the best examples of Griffin’s architecture in Australia" and "Newman College is significant as an outstanding expression of Griffin’s architectural style". The stonework has had substantial renovation to repair over 80 years of damage through exposure and natural degradation of the original stone and received the Australian Institute of Architects (Victorian Chapter) Heritage Architecture Award 2010.

=== Allan & Maria Myers Academic Centre ===
The Allan & Maria Myers Academic Centre is a library shared by St Mary's College and Newman College. It is open to students 24 hours a day. It offers a program of public events and hosts several special collections that are available to researchers.

The centre houses the Newman College Irish collection (O'Donnell Collection), which was formed in 1924 with a bequest to the college. It originally consisted of around 700 books and 300 pamphlets, many in the Irish language, which were the personal library of Nicholas O’Donnell, a Melbourne Irish language scholar of the early 20th century. Around half the collection consists of historical works. The rest deals with language, literature, biography, religion, politics, description and travel, with some works on music and a few on education.

Every year an O'Donnell Fellowship is bestowed on a visiting scholar so that the holder may do research in the O'Donnell Collection.

== Administration ==
At its opening in 1918 the administration of the college was entrusted to the Society of Jesus (Jesuits) who continue its administration to the present day.

The college council, chaired by the Archbishop of Melbourne, oversees the governance of the college. Members include the Rector, the other three diocesan bishops of Victoria (Sandhurst, Ballarat and Sale dioceses), college alumni and members of the university. Members are appointed by the Archbishop. Each year the Provost selects two students to be members as student representatives. The presidents of the Students' Club and SCR are observers who reports to the council on the life of the college.

The college council has instituted the positions of provost, deputy provost, dean of studies and dean of students to oversee the everyday administration of the college. The Provost is the official head of the college. These positions are currently held by:

- Rector: The Very Reverend Daniel Madigan SJ
- Provost: Guglielmo Gottoli
- Deputy Provost: Rebecca Daley
- Dean of Studies: Mitch Robertson
- Dean of Students: Alicia Deak

The college chaplain and operations manager are also members of the college administration.

=== Rectors ===
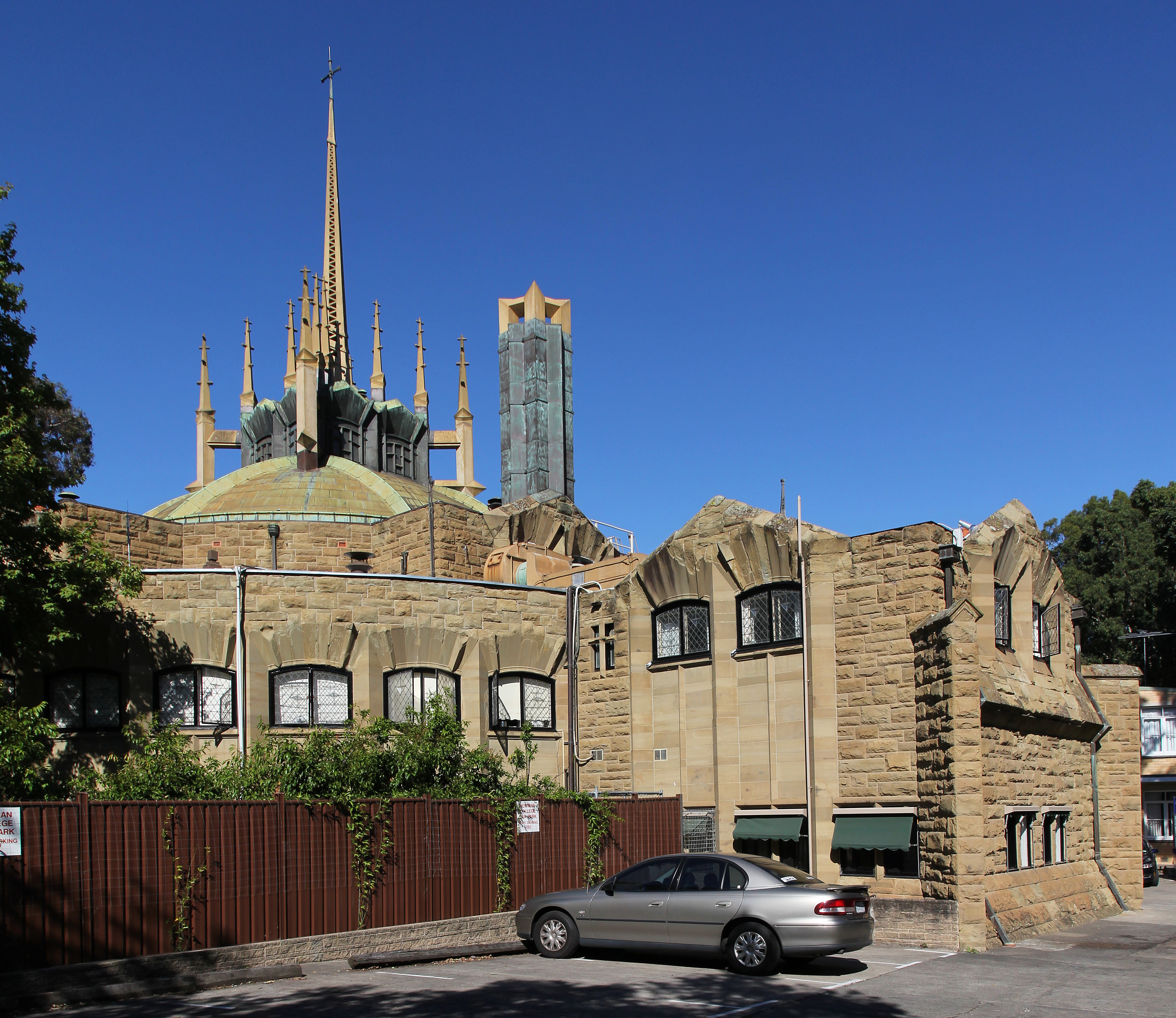
Dome of Newman College

As of 2024, the rector of the college is Daniel Madigan SJ, a Jesuit priest, Islamic studies scholar and academic.

Order	Title	Rector	Term start	Term end	Time in office	Notes
1	The Very Rev.	James O'Dwyer SJ	1918	1919	0–1 years	
2	The Very Rev.	Albert Power SJ	1919	1923	3–4 years	
3	The Very Rev.	Jeremiah Murphy SJ	1923	1954	30–31 years	
4	The Very Rev.	Philip Gleeson SJ	1954	1961	6–7 years	
5	The Very Rev.	Michael Scott SJ	1961	1968	6–7 years	
6	The Very Rev.	Gerald Daily SJ	1968	1977	8–9 years	
7	The Very Rev.	Brian Fleming SJ	1977	1986	8–9 years	
8	The Very Rev.	William Uren SJ	1987	1990	4 years	
9	The Very Rev.	Peter L'Estrange SJ	1991	2005	15 years	Moved to Campion Hall, Oxford
10	The Very Rev.	William Uren SJ AO	2006	2019	15 years	Remains a scholar-in-residence
11	The Very Rev.	Frank Brennan SJ AO	2020	2023	4 years	Moved to Brisbane
12	The Very Rev.	Daniel Madigan SJ	2024	present		

== Notable alumni ==
Notable alumni of the college include:

- Kevin Andrews – former Australian Cabinet Minister (2001-7) and (2013-15). Mr Andrews served as Minister for Defence (Australia) and was also Father of the House, having been a Member of Parliament continuously from 1991 until 2022.
- Jim Bowler - geologist and archaeologist, famous for the Lake Mungo remains
- Frank Brennan – Jesuit priest, human rights lawyer and academic
- Ben Buckingham - Australian Olympian
- Peta Credlin – chief of staff to the former Prime Minister of Australia, Tony Abbott
- Greg Dening - Australian historian
- Neale Daniher – former AFL footballer (Essendon Football Club), 2025 Australian of the Year
- Marg Downey – comedian and actress
- Frank Galbally CBE – criminal defence lawyer
- John Galbally CBE, QC – former Labor politician
- Sir James Gobbo – 25th Governor of Victoria and former Victorian Supreme Court judge, a former Rhodes Scholar
- James P. Gorman – CEO and chairman of Morgan Stanley
- Sir Gregory Gowans - left-leaning intellectual, lawyer and former Victorian Supreme Court judge
- Jack Hibberd – playwright
- John Mulvaney - archaeologist and historian
- Allan Myers – barrister, philanthropist and chancellor of the University of Melbourne
- Brenda Niall – biographer, literary critic and journalist
- Gemma Sisia – humanitarian, founder of the School of St Jude
- Charles Sweeney QC – Federal Court of Australia judge
- Richard Tracey – Federal Court of Australia judge

== See also ==
- List of Jesuit sites
