= Allan Myers =

Australian lawyer, academic and philanthropist

Allan Myers AC, KC
- Born: 17 October 1947 (age 79); Hamilton, Victoria, Australia
- Education: University of Melbourne; University of Oxford
- Occupations: Lawyer, academic, landowner, businessman, philanthropist
- Spouse: Maria Myers AC
- Children: 3
- Parent(s): John and Betty Myers
- Awards: Companion of the Order of Australia (AC) (2016); Centenary Medal (2001)

Allan James Myers AC, KC (born 17 October 1947) is an Australian barrister, academic, businessman, landowner and philanthropist, and the previous Chancellor of the University of Melbourne.

== Early life and education ==
Allan Myers was born in 1947 in Hamilton, Victoria. He was raised in Dunkeld, Victoria, where his father, John Norman Myers, worked as a butcher following his service as a stoker in the Royal Australian Navy Reserve during World War II. He has five siblings. He graduated from the University of Melbourne, where he received a Bachelor of Arts and a Bachelor of Laws, and resided at Newman College. He was editor of the Melbourne University Law Review from 1967 to 1969. He received the Supreme Court Prize in 1969. He went on to receive a Bachelor of Civil Law from the University of Oxford.

== Career ==
=== Legal career ===
He became a lawyer in 1971. He taught as a tutor at the Melbourne Law School. He later taught at Osgoode Hall Law School of York University in Toronto, Canada, from 1972 to 1974. He returned to the University of Melbourne in 1974, where he taught Security Law and Taxation Law from 1974 to 1988. He served as Assistant Editor of the Australian Taxation Law Review.

He was admitted to the Victorian Bar in 1975 and took Silk in 1986. He serves on the advisory council of the Oxford University Law Foundation. He has represented George Pell, Kerry Stokes, Lloyd Williams, Alan Bond, John Elliott, Andrew Forrest and Gina Rinehart as well as Citibank and BHP.

=== Business career ===
He sits on the board of directors of Grupa Żywiec, a Polish brewery in which he is now a small shareholder, alongside investor John Higgins. He serves on the board of directors of Norinvest Holding, a Swiss financial corporation, and owns the Royal Mail Hotel, a restaurant in Dunkeld, and the Dunkeld Pastoral Company, as well as 10,000 hectares (25,000 acres) around Dunkeld. He also owns land in the Kimberley and the Tipperary Station near Adelaide River in the Northern Territory, which he purchased from businessman Warren Anderson.

=== Philanthropy and other roles ===
He is a former president of the National Gallery of Victoria (NGV), to which he has made significant contributions. In 2013, he donated A$10 million to his alma mater, the University of Melbourne. Additionally, he served as chairman of its BELIEVE fundraising campaign. He has served on the Boards of Trustees of the Alfred Felton Bequest, the Catholic Education Commission, the Monivae College Foundation, the Florey Institute of Neuroscience and Mental Health, the Ian Potter Foundation, and the Newman College Foundation. He has also donated to the University of Oxford.

He helped found the Grattan Institute, a non-partisan public policy think tank, and serves as its chairman. He was a member of Liberty Victoria, formerly known as the Victorian Council for Civil Liberties. He joined the board of the Minderoo Foundation in 2014 and became its chairman in 2024.

Myers endowed the Allan Myers Oxford University Scholarships, enabling law students at the University of Melbourne to attend the University of Oxford. He received an Honorary Doctor of the University from the Australian Catholic University and an Honorary Doctor of Laws from his alma mater, the University of Melbourne.

Myers served as Chancellor of the University of Melbourne, from 2017 to December 2022. He and Maria Myers are two of the donors to the trust that funds the Peter Steele Poetry Award, a scholarship available to PhD students in the Faculty of Arts at the university.

== Personal life ==
Allen Myers is married to Maria Myers AC, and they live in the Melbourne suburb of Carlton. They have two daughters, Clare and Cecilia, and one son, John. Myers is a Roman Catholic and a member of the Order of Malta.

=== Net worth ===
Year	Financial Review Rich List		Forbes Australia's 50 Richest	
Year	Rank	Net worth (A$)	Rank	Net worth (US$)
2014		$700 million		
2015				
2016				
2017		$682 million		
2018	102 ▲	$749 million ▲		
2019	123 ▼	$771 million ▲		
2020	127 ▼	$791 million ▲		
2021	131 ▼	$834 million ▲		
2022	151 ▼	$883 million ▲		
2023	166 ▼	$844 million ▼		
2024		$928 million ▲		
2025	169	$939 million ▲		

Legend
Icon	Description
Steady	Has not changed from the previous year
▲	Has increased from the previous year
▼	Has decreased from the previous year

=== Honours ===
Myers was awarded the Centenary Medal in 2001 for his philanthropic and business achievements. In 2016 he was appointed Companion of the Order of Australia for "eminent service to the community through philanthropic leadership in support of major visual arts, higher education, medical research and not-for-profit organisations, to the law, and to professional learning programs". His wife, Maria, was appointed a Companion on the same day.

Academic offices
Preceded by Elizabeth Alexander	Chancellor of the University of Melbourne; 2017–2022	Succeeded by Jane Hansen
