= Good Reading =

Australian magazine on books and reading

- Good Reading, June 2009 issue
- Editor: Rowena Morcom
- Categories: Books and reading
- Frequency: Monthly
- Founded: 2001
- First issue: 1/07/2001
- Company: Good Reading Magazine Pty Ltd
- Country: Australia
- Based in: Sydney
- Language: English
- Website: www.GoodReadingMagazine.com.au

Good Reading is an Australian monthly magazine about books and reading. It was launched in July 2001 and is published in Sydney. Its content includes author profiles and interviews, book extracts, news of book-related events, and independent reviews of Australian and international fiction and non-fiction for adults, young adults and children.

The print magazine featured more than 5,000 author interviews since its inception. High-profile and bestselling international authors who were interviewed and featured include Maeve Binchy, Tim Winton, Michael Ondaatje, Sir David Attenborough, Alexander McCall Smith, Amitav Ghosh, Sebastian Faulks, Linwood Barclay, and Joanna Trollope.

In 2011 the publication launched a digital version of the magazine and in 2025 relaunched its online platform, carrying reviews, interviews, articles about books and digital editions of the magazine. A digital edition is also available to library members through subscriptions to Australian and New Zealand and international public libraries and schools.
