= Belinda Probert =

Australian social scientist (born 1949)

Belinda Probert (born 1949) is an Australian social scientist and writer who has advised non-government organisations and state and national governments in Australia. Her academic research and writing has been in the areas of employment policy, gender equity, and work and welfare reform, including households and the domestic division of labour. She has held senior leadership roles in several universities as well as with the Australian Research Council, where she was a member and Deputy Chair of the Research Training and Careers Committee (1993–1998), and member of the Social, Behavioural and Economic Sciences Expert Advisory Committee.

In 2000, Probert was elected as a Fellow of the Academy of the Social Sciences in Australia. Other key appointments have been Chair of the Best Value in Local Government Commission Victoria, member of the Work Family and Community Life Advisory Committee of the Office of Women’s Policy in the Department of Premier and Cabinet of the Victorian State Government, and commissioner of the Australian Council of Social Service Future of Work Commission. Probert was a foundation member of the Carrick Institute/Australian Learning and Teaching Council (2004–2009).

After retiring from her university career, Probert became a writer of narrative nonfiction, with books published in 2021 and 2025.

== Early life ==
Born in Brentwood, Essex, England, Probert gained her BSc (economics) in 1971 at University College, London. After two years as a research assistant at the Northern Ireland Research Institute, Belfast, United Kingdom, she gained a Social Science Research Council scholarship for postgraduate studies at Lancaster University, where she was awarded a PhD in 1976 for her thesis on protestant politics in Northern Ireland. She settled in Australia in 1976 to take up a lectureship in social and political theory at Murdoch University in Western Australia.

== Career ==
In 1980, Probert moved from Murdoch to a research fellowship in the School of Social Sciences at Flinders University, South Australia. The next year, she moved to Monash University, Melbourne, where she held the positions of lecturer (1981–1984) and senior lecturer (1984–1990) in sociology.

She then gained a senior research fellowship at the Centre for International Research on Communication and Information Technologies (CIRCIT), in Melbourne (1990–1993). From 1993 to 2004, she was employed at RMIT University, Melbourne as professor and head of the Department of Social Science (1993–1996), as well as Executive Editor of the journal Labour and Industry. She was subsequently appointed director of the Centre for Applied Social Research (1997–2000), head of the School of Social Science and Planning (1998–2001), dean of the faculty of the Constructed Environment (2001–2002), and pro vice-chancellor (design and social context) (2003–2004).

Towards the end of her term, the university became embroiled in controversy when the software system crashed. The chancellor suddenly resigned the following year and factions formed around the role of the vice-chancellor. Probert publicly supported the vice-chancellor, an outsider with no background as a working academic and the first female head of a university in Victoria.

In 2004, she moved back to Perth to the University of Western Australia as pro vice-chancellor (academic) (2004–2006). In 2005 she represented the Department of Education and Training on the Curriculum Council of Western Australia. Also in 2005 her research paper, "‘I Just Couldn’t Fit It In’: Gender and Unequal Outcomes in Academic Careers" was published in the journal Gender, Work and Organization.

At the beginning of 2006, she moved to Victoria for a five-year appointment as dean of the Faculty of Arts at the University of Melbourne (2006–2007). She began her task of guiding the faculty through a difficult and controversial restructure of the university to a two-tier US-style teaching model that involved significant cuts (including shedding the Department of Geography and Environmental Studies) and strident staff reaction. She resigned after only sixteen months, citing personal reasons: she wanted time to care for her elderly mother in France and to be with her daughter in London.

She returned, however, to Australia the following year as deputy vice-chancellor at La Trobe University (2008–2012), When the university restructured in 2011 with the departure of the vice-chancellor, she retired from active university service to focus on policy and research work, remaining an adjunct professor role in the College of Arts, Social Sciences and Commerce at the university.

She was seconded to the Office for Learning and Teaching in the Department of Education (2013–2015), and has acted as a consultant and media commentator in educational services.

== Bibliography ==
=== Books ===
- Probert, Belinda (1978). Beyond Orange and Green : the political economy of the Northern Ireland crisis. London: Zed Press.
- Working Life: Arguments about Work in Australian Society, Belinda Probert. McPhee Gribble, 1989. ISBN 9780869140666
- Pink Collar Blues: Work, Gender & Technology, Belinda Probert and Bruce W Wilson (eds). Melbourne University Press, 1993. ISBN 9780522845204
- Gender Pay Equity in Australian Higher Education, Belinda Probert, Peter Ewer, and Kim Whiting. National Tertiary Education Union, 1998. ISBN 9780958520911
- Double Shift: Working Mothers and Social Change in Australia, Patricia Grimshaw, John Murphy and Belinda Probert (eds)., Melbourne Publishing Group. 2005 ISBN 9780958093880
- Imaginative Possession: Learning to Live in the Antipodes, Belinda Probert. Upswell Publishing, Perth, 2021. ISBN 978-0-6450763-0-1
- Bill's Secrets: Class, War and Ambition, Belinda Probert. Upswell Publishing, Perth 2025
