= BIP =

Bip or BiP or BIP may refer to:

== Software ==
- BiP – Messaging, Voice and Video Calling: a smartphone application

== Entertainment ==
- Bip (channel), a comedy channel
- Bip the clown, a famous character of mime Marcel Marceau
- Bachelor in Paradise (American TV series)

== Organizations ==
- BIP Brewery, (Serbian: Beogradska industrija piva), a brewery in Belgrade, Serbia
- BIP Investment Partners, an investment company
- Botswana Independence Party, a political party in Botswana
- British International Pictures, a British film production, distribution and exhibition company

== People ==
- Bip Apollo, a formerly anonymous painter and sculptor
- Ethel "Bip" Pares (1904–1977), Art Deco illustrator, designed over 600 book covers, created iconic posters for London Transport
- Bip Roberts (born 1963), American Major League Baseball player
- Boom Bip (born 1974), American record producer and musician
- Bipasha Basu (born 1979), Indian actress, sometimes abbreviated simply as "Bip"

== Technology ==
- bip! (Red Metropolitana de Movilidad), a contactless smartcard fare system used in Transantiago and Metro de Santiago, in Santiago de Chile
- Basic Imaging Profile, a Bluetooth profile for sending images between devices
- Bearer Independent Protocol
- Binary integer programming, a special case of integer programming
- Bit interface parity, parity protection on computer interfaces
- BiP chemical formula for bismuth phosphide
- Bitcoin Improvement Proposal (BIP)

== Transport ==
- Bishopstone railway station, a railway station in Sussex, England

== Other uses ==
- Binding immunoglobulin protein (BiP), a molecular ER chaperone that regulates protein folding
- Biuletyn Informacji Publicznej (Bulletin of Public Information), a government-sponsored public information system in Poland
- Bishopstone, East Sussex (also known as Bip), a village in East Sussex located near Seaford.

== See also ==
- Basis point (bp), pronounced as bip
- Bips (disambiguation)
- BP (disambiguation)
- Beep (disambiguation)
- Bop (disambiguation)
