= 2003 in poetry =

Nationality words link to articles with information on the nation's poetry or literature (for instance, Irish or France).

== Events ==
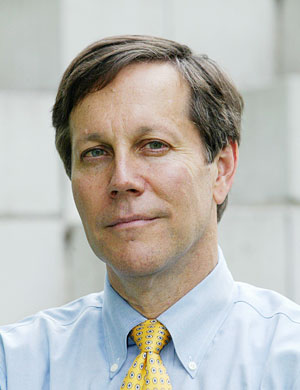
Dana Gioia

- January 29 – Poet Dana Gioia, who had retired early from his career as a corporate executive at General Foods to write full-time, becomes chair of the National Endowment for the Arts, the United States government's arts agency.
- February 12 – After First Lady Laura Bush invites a number of poets to the White House for this date, one of them, Sam Hamill, starts organizing a protest in which poets would bring anti-war poems. The conference is postponed, but Hamill organizes a "Poets Against the War" Web site with contributions from others. More than 5,000 poems are contributed, including work by John Balaban, Gregory Orr, Rita Dove, Lawrence Ferlinghetti and Adrienne Rich, Stanley Kunitz, Marilyn Nelson, Jay Parini, Jamaica Kincaid, Grace Paley and U.S. Poet Laureate Billy Collins. Also on the Web site, W. S. Merwin contributes the statement: "To arrange a war in order to be re-elected outdoes even the means employed in the last presidential election. Mr. Bush and his plans are a greater danger to the United States than Saddam Hussein." The new group, "Poets Against the War", organizes poetry readings for February 12 across the country, demonstrating the strong links between many established poets and left-wing pacifism.
- July 2 – In the aftermath of public controversy ignited by state poet laureate Amiri Baraka (b. 1934) reading his incendiary and anti-Semitic poem "Somebody Blew Up America" about the September 11th Attacks, and Baraka's subsequent refusals to resign from the position, New Jersey Governor Jim McGreevey signs legislation abolishing the post of Poet Laureate of New Jersey.
- Early November – Carl Rakosi celebrates his 100th birthday with friends at the San Francisco Public Library.

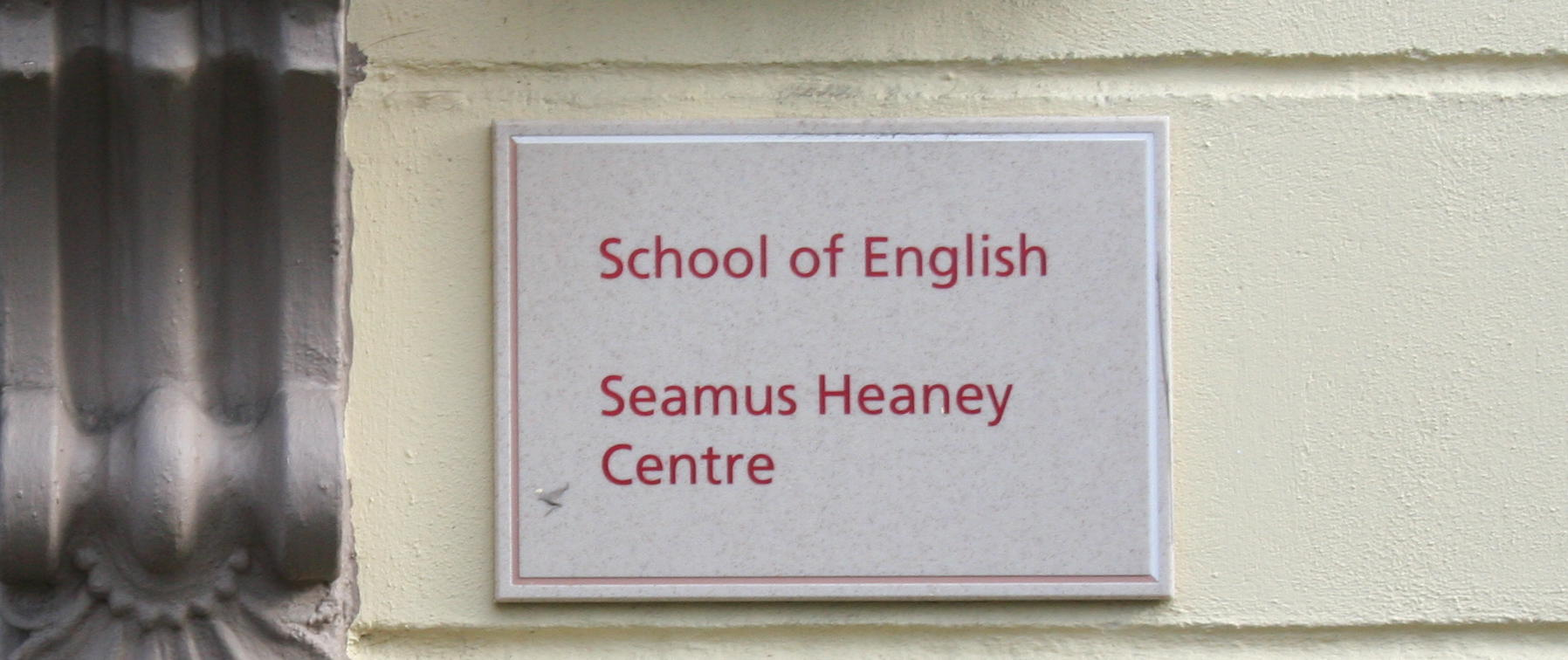

- The Seamus Heaney Centre for Poetry is opened at Queens University, Belfast, this year. It houses the Heaney Media Archive, a unique record of Heaney's entire oeuvre, as well as a full catalogue of his radio and television presentations. This same year Heaney decides to lodge a substantial portion of his literary archive at Emory University.
- Call: Review, an American little magazine, is founded by poet John Most.

== Works published in English ==
Listed by nation where the work was first published and again by the poet's native land, if different; substantially revised works listed separately:

=== Australia ===
- Judith Beveridge, Wolf Notes, winner of the 2004 Arts Queensland Judith Wright Calanthe Award
- Pam Brown, Dear Deliria (New & Selected Poems), winner of the 2004 NSW Premier's Award for Poetry.
- Laurie Duggan, Mangroves
- Brook Emery, Misplaced Heart, Five Islands Press. ISBN 978-1-7412-8018-0
- John Kinsella, Peripheral Light
- Alison Croggon, The Common Flesh: Poems 1980–2002, Arc, ISBN 1-900072-72-6
- Geoff Page, editor The Indigo Book of Modern Australian Sonnets, Indigo (anthology)
- Chris Wallace-Crabbe, A Representative Human, Brunswick: Gungurru Press

=== Canada ===
- Derek Beaulieu, with wax (Coach House Books) ISBN 978-1-55245-118-2
- George Bowering, Baseball: A Poem in the Magic Number 9 (Coach House Books) ISBN 978-1-55245-123-6
- Di Brandt, Now You Care (Coach House Books) ISBN 978-1-55245-127-4
- Anne Compton, Opening the Island
- Joe Denham, Flux
- Jill Hartman, A Painted Elephant (Coach House Books) ISBN 978-1-55245-117-5
- Raymond Knister, After Exile. complete poems compiled by Gregory Betts (Exile, 2003)
- Dennis Lee, Un. Toronto: Anansi.
- Tim Lilburn, Kill-site, winner of the Governor General's Award
- Don McKay, Varves, a chapbook
- W.W.E. Ross, Irrealities, Sonnets & Laconics. (Exile Editions, 2003) ISBN 978-1-55096-561-2
- Anne Simpson Loop, shortlisted for the 2003 Governor General's Award, winner of the 2004 Canadian Griffin Poetry Prize, ISBN 0-7710-8075-1
- Raymond Souster, Twenty-three New Poems. Ottawa: Oberon Press.
- Nathalie Stephens, Paper City (Coach House Books) ISBN 978-1-55245-126-7
- Suzanne Zelazo, Parlance (Coach House Books) ISBN 978-1-55245-128-1

=== India, in English ===
- Hemant Divate, Virus Alert, translated from the original Marathi language poetry- by Dilip Chitre; Mumbai : Poetrywala
- Jerry Pinto, Asylum and Other Poems (Poetry in English), Allied Publishers, ISBN 81-7764-527-7
- Sudeep Sen:
  - Distracted Geography: An Archipelago of Intent (Poetry in English), Wings Press, ISBN 0-930324-95-1; Leeds: Peepal Tree, ISBN 1-900715-34-1; (reprinted 2004, New Delhi : Indialog Publications, 2004, ISBN 978-1-900715-34-8)
  - Prayer Flag (Poetry in English) with a compact disc and photographs; New York : Wings Press, 2003, ISBN 0-930324-97-8; Leeds: Peepal Tree, ISBN 1-900715-12-0
- Sachin Ketkar, A Dirge for the Dead Dog and other Incantations (Poetry in English), New Delhi : Sanbun Publishers
- Ajmer Rode, Selected Poems, by a Punjabi; Third Eye Publications, ISBN 0-919581-76-5

=== Ireland ===
- Rosita Boland, Dissecting the Heart, Oldcastle: The Gallery Press, ISBN 978-1-85235-344-5
- Ciaran Carson, Breaking News, Oldcastle: The Gallery Press, ISBN 978-1-85235-340-7
- Michael Coady, One Another, (poems and prose), Oldcastle: The Gallery Press, ISBN 978-1-85235-357-5
- Gerald Dawe, Lake Geneva, Oldcastle: The Gallery Press, ISBN 978-1-85235-342-1

=== New Zealand ===
- Jenny Bornholdt, Summer
- Robin Hyde, Young Knowledge: the poems of Robin Hyde, edited and introduced by Michele Leggott, Auckland: Auckland University Press, posthumous

==== Poets in Best New Zealand Poems ====
Poems from these 25 poet s were selected by Elizabeth Smither for Best New Zealand Poems 2002, published online this year:

- Jenny Bornholdt
- Diana Bridge
- Rachel Bush
- Kate Camp
- Glen Colqu houn
- Murray Edmond
- Paula Green
- Michael Harlow
- David Howard
- Andrew Johnston
- Anne Kennedy
- Michele Leggott
- Emma Neale
- Bob Orr
- Chris Orsman
- Vincent O'Sullivan
- Bill Sewell
- Anna Smaill
- Kendrick Smithyman
- C. K. Stead
- Robert Sullivan
- Jo Thorpe
- Rae Varcoe
- Louise Wrightson
- Sonja Yelich

=== United Kingdom ===
- Gerry Cambridge, Madame Fi Fi's Farewell and other poems, Luath Press, ISBN 1-84282-005-2
- Vahni Capildeo, No Traveller Returns, Caribbean poet
- Ciarán Carson, Breaking News, Gallery Press, Wake Forest University Press, awarded the 2003 Forward Prize for Best Poetry Collection
- Julia Darling, Sudden Collapses in Public Places
- Carol Ann Duffy, The Good Child's Guide to Rock N Roll, Faber and Faber (children's poetry)
- James Fenton, The Love Bomb, verse written as a libretto for a composer who rejected it; Penguin / Faber and Faber
- Lavinia Greenlaw, Minsk, Faber and Faber
- Peter Redgrove, Sheen
- Simawe, Saadi, editor, Iraqi Poetry Today, London: King's College, ISBN 0-9533824-6-X

==== Criticism, scholarship and biography in the United Kingdom ====
- R. F. Foster, W. B. Yeats: A Life, Vol. II: The Arch-Poet 1915–1939, Oxford University Press ISBN 0-19-818465-4
- Matthew Campbell, editor, The Cambridge Companion to Contemporary Irish Poetry, Cambridge University Press

=== United States ===
- Dick Allen, The Day Before: New Poems (Sarabande Books)
- Mark Bibbins, Sky Lounge (Graywolf Press)
- Charles Bukowski, sifting through the madness for the Word, the line, the way (Ecco)
- Henri Cole, Middle Earth (Farrar, Straus & Giroux); a New York Times "notable book of the year"
- Cid Corman, Now/Now
- Annie Finch, Calendars
- Richard Greenfield, A Carnage in the Lovetress (University of California Press)
- John Hollander, Picture Window
- William Logan, Macbeth in Venice
- Howard Nemerov, The Selected Poems of Howard Nemerov, edited by Daniel Anderson (Swallow/Ohio University) published posthumously); a New York Times "notable book of the year"
- Mary Oliver, Owls and Other Fantasies: poems and essays
- Willie Perdomo, Smoking Lovely
- James Reiss, Riff on Six: New and Selected Poems
- Kenneth Rexroth, Complete Poems (posthumous)
- Margaret Reynolds, The Sappho History (scholarship), Palgrave Macmillan, ISBN 978-0-333-97170-3 ISBN 0-333-97170-1
- C. J. Sage, editor, And We The Creatures: Fifty-one Contemporary American Poets on Animal Rights and Appreciation (Dream Horse Press)
- Charles Simic, The Voice at 3:00 a.m.: Selected Late & New Poems (Harvest Books)(Harcourt); a New York Times "notable book of the year"
- Tracy K. Smith, The Body's Question won the 2002 Cave Canem Prize for best first book by an African American poet (Graywolf Press)
- Rosmarie Waldrop, Love, Like Pronouns (Omnidawn Publishing)
- William Carlos Williams and Louis Zukofsky, The Correspondence of William Carlos Williams & Louis Zukofsky, edited by Barry Ahearn (Wesleyan University Press)
- Kirby Wright, Before the City (Lemon Shark Press); winner of the San Diego Book Award for Poetry

==== Poets included in The Best American Poetry 2003 ====
The 75 poets included in The Best American Poetry 2003, edited by David Lehman, co-edited this year by Yusef Komunyakaa:

- Jonathan Aaron
- Beth Anderson
- Nin Andrews
- Wendell Berry
- Frank Bidart
- Diann Blakely
- Bruce Bond
- Catherine Bowman
- Rosemary Catacalos
- Joshua Clover
- Billy Collins
- Michael S. Collins
- Carl Dennis
- Susan Dickman
- Rita Dove
- Stephen Dunn
- Stuart Dybek
- Charles Fort
- James Galvin
- Amy Gerstler
- Louise Glück
- Michael Goldman
- Ray Gonzalez
- Linda Gregg
- Mark Halliday
- Michael S. Harper
- Matthea Harvey
- George V. Higgins
- Edward Hirsch
- Tony Hoagland
- Richard Howard
- Rodney Jones
- Joy Katz
- Brigit Pegeen Kelly
- Galway Kinnell
- Carolyn Kizer
- Jennifer L. Knox
- Kenneth Koch
- John Koethe
- Ted Kooser
- Philip Levine
- J. D. McClatchy
- W. S. Merwin
- Stanley Moss
- Heather Moss
- Paul Muldoon
- Peggy Munson
- Marilyn Nelson
- Daniel Nester
- Naomi Shihab Nye
- Ishle Yi Park
- Robert Pinsky
- Kevin Prufer
- Ed Roberson
- Vijay Seshadri
- Myra Shapiro
- Alan Shapiro
- Bruce Smith
- Charlie Smith
- Maura Stanton
- Ruth Stone
- James Tate
- William Tremblay
- Natasha Trethewey
- David Wagoner
- Ronald Wallace
- Lewis Warsh
- Susan Wheeler
- Richard Wilbur
- C. K. Williams
- Terence Winch
- David Wojahn
- Robert Wrigley
- Anna Ziegler
- Ahmos Zu-Bolton II

== Works published in other languages ==
=== French language ===
==== France ====
- Seyhmus Dagtekin, Couleurs démêlées du ciel, publisher: L'Harmattan; Kurdish Turkish poet writing in French
- Abdellatif Laabi, Moroccan author writing in French:
  - L'automne promet, La Différence, coll. Clepsydre, Paris
  - Les Fruits du corps, La Différence, coll. Clepsydre, Paris
  - Œuvre poétique, La Différence, coll. Œuvre complète, Paris

==== Canada, in French ====
- Denise Desautels, La marathonienne, avec estampes de Maria Cronopoulos, Montréal: Éditions de la courte échelle
- 2003 * Jean Royer, Demeures du silence, Trois-Rivières: Écrits des Forges / Esch-sur-Alzette: Éditions Phi

=== Germany ===
- Christoph Buchwald, general editor, and Michael Krueger, guest editor, Jahrbuch der Lyrik 2004 ("Poetry Yearbook 2004"), publisher: Beck; anthology
- Daniel Falb, Daniela Seel, and Andrew Potterof, die räumung dieser parks ("the clearance of these parks"), Kookbooks
- Bjoern Kuligk and Jan Wagner, editors, Lyrik von Jetzt ("Poetry of Now"), publisher: Dumont Verlag, featuring poetry by 74 authors born since 1965 (Lyrik von Jetzt 2) followed in 2008

=== Bengali language ===
==== Bangladesh ====
- Chandan Chowdhury, Jabe he majhi, diksonnopur, Balaka prakash, Chittagong, Bangladesh

=== India ===
In each section, listed in alphabetical order by first name:

==== Bengali ====
- Debarati Mitra, Khonpa Bhare Achhe Tarar Dhuloy, Kolkata: Ananda Publishers; India, Bengali-language
- Mallika Sengupta:
  - Purushke Lekha Chithi, Kolkata: Ananda Publishers
  - Editor, Dui Banglar Meyeder Shreshtha kabita, Kolkata: Upasana
- Nirendranath Chakravarti, Bhalobasha Mondobasha, Kolkata: Ananda Publishers; Bengali-language
- Udaya Narayana Singh, Kham-kheyali, Kolkata: Ebang Mushayera

==== Other in India ====
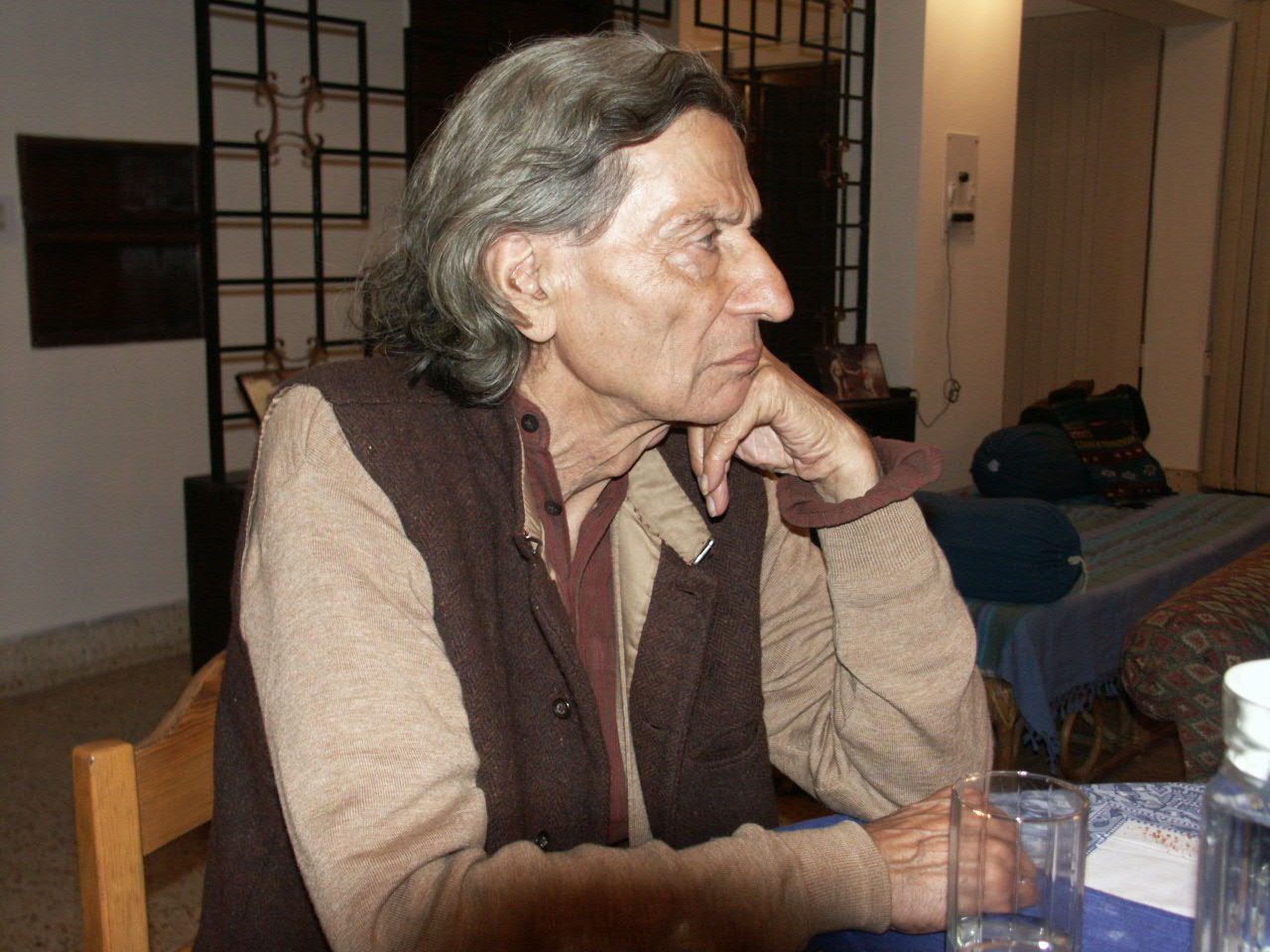
Indian poet Keshav Malik, also a writer and arts curator, in a photograph taken this year

- Gagan Gill, Thapak Thapak Dil Thapak Thapa, New Delhi: Rajkamal Prakashan; Punjabi-language
- Kynpham Sing Nongkynrih, editor, Anthology of Contemporary Poetry from the Northeast, North-Eastern Hill University; Kahsi-language
- Kanaka Ha Ma, translator, Battalike, a translation of Javed Akhtar's Tarkash from the original Urdu into Kannada; Puttur, Karnataka: Karnataka Sangha
- Kutti Revathi, Thanimaiyin Aayiram Irakkaigal ("One Thousand Wings of Solitude"), Chennai: Panikkudam Pathippagam; Tamil-language
- Malathi Maithri, Neerindri Amaiyaathu Ulagu, ("There Can Be No Earth Without Water"), Nagercoil: Kalachuvadu Pathippagam; Tamil-language
- Nilmani Phookan, Alop Agota Ami Ki Kotha Pati Ashilo, Guwahati, Assam: Students’ Store, Assamese-language
- Rajendra Kishore Panda; Oraya-language:
  - Collected Poems – Sada Prusthha, Bhubaneswar: Metanym, Oraya-language
  - Drohavakya, Bhubaneswar: Metanym,
  - Dujanari, Bhubaneswar: Metanym,
  - Vairagi Bhramar, Bhubaneswar: Metanym,
  - Satyottara, Bhubaneswar: Metanym,
  - Bahwarambhe, Bhubaneswar: Metanym,
- S. Joseph, Meenkaran, Kottayam: DC Books, ISBN 81-264-0616-X; Malayalam-language
- Salma, Pachchai Devathai, Nagercoil: Kalachuvadu Pathippagam; Tamil-language
- Saroop Dhruv, Gujarati-language:
  - Hastkshep, Ahmedabad: Samvedan Sanskritic Manch, Ahmedabad
  - Sahiyara Suraj Ni Khoj Ma, Ahmedabad: Samvedan Sanskritic Manch
- Thangjam Ibopishak Singh, Manam ("The Human Scent"), Imphal: Writer's Forum; Meitei language poet and academic
- Rustam (Rustam Singh), Rustam ki Kavitaen, a collection of poetry in Hindi, (ISBN 81-8143-046-8), Vani Prakashan, New Delhi.

=== Poland ===
- Ewa Lipska, Ja ("I"); Kraków: Wydawnictwo literackie
- Bronisław Maj, Elegie, treny, sny; Kraków: Znak
- Czesław Miłosz, Orfeusz i Eurydyka ("Orpheus and Eurydice"); Kraków: Wydawnictwo Literackie
- Tomasz Różycki, Świat i Antyświat ("World and Antiworld"), Warsaw: Lampa i Iskra Boża
- Eugeniusz Tkaczyszyn-Dycki:
  - Daleko stąd zostawiłem swoje dawne i niedawne ciało
  - Przyczynek do nauki o nieistnieniu
- Adam Zagajewski, Powrót, Kraków: a5
- Wisława Szymborska: Rymowanki dla dużych dzieci ("Rhymes for Big Kids")

=== Other languages ===
- Pope John Paul II, Roman Triptych. Meditations, Polish poet published in the Vatican City and in Italian translation (Trittico romano, Meditazioni)
- Inga Kuznetsova, Sni-Sinitsi ("Chickadee Dreams"), winner of the Triumph youth prize and the Moscow Score Award for best first book; Russia
- Marie Šťastná, Krajina s Ofélií ("Scenery with Ophelia"), Czech Republic
- Yi Sha, Yi Sha shixuan ("Yi Sha's Poems"), China

== Awards and honors ==
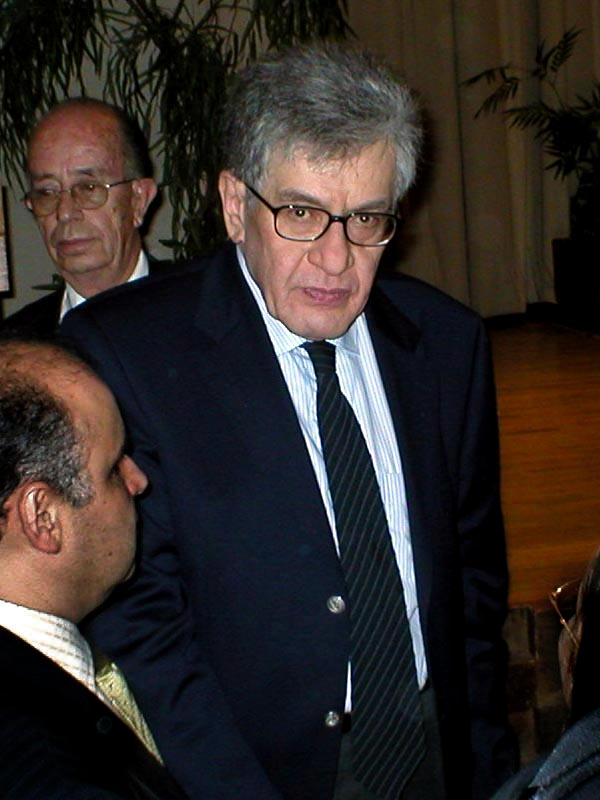
José Emilio Pacheco at the Octavio Paz award this year

=== Australia ===
- C. J. Dennis Prize for Poetry: Emma Lew, Anything the Landlord Touches
- Dinny O'Hearn Poetry Prize: Mangroves by Laurie Duggan, University of Queensland Press
- Grace Leven Prize for Poetry: Stephen Edgar, Lost in the Foreground, Duffy & Snellgrove
- Ipswich Poetry Feast: RT Edwards Awards – Open - Other Poetry First Prize, Denis Kevans, Dots Before the Eyes; Chairperson's Encouragement Award, Dan O’Donnell, Sydney's Central Station
- Kenneth Slessor Prize for Poetry: Jill Jones, Screens Jets Heaven

=== Canada ===
- Gerald Lampert Award: Kathy Mac, Nail Builders Plan for Strength and Growth
- Archibald Lampman Award: Shane Rhodes, Holding Pattern
- Atlantic Poetry Prize: Anne Compton, Opening the Island
- Governor General's Award for English-language poetry: Tim Lilburn, Kill-site
- Governor General's Award for French-language poetry: Pierre Nepveu, Lignes aériennes
- Griffin Poetry Prize Canada: Margaret Avison, Concrete and Wild Carrot; International, in the English Language: Paul Muldoon, Moy sand and gravel
- Pat Lowther Award: Dionne Brand, thirsty
- Prix Alain-Grandbois: Danielle Fournier, Poèmes perdus en Hongrie
- Dorothy Livesay Poetry Prize: bill bissett, peter among th towring boxes / text bites
- Prix Émile-Nelligan: Jean-Simon DesRochers, Parle seul

=== New Zealand ===
- Prime Minister's Awards for Literary Achievement:
- Montana New Zealand Book Awards First-book award for poetry: Kay McKenzie Cooke, Feeding the Dogs, University of Otago Press

=== United Kingdom ===
- Cholmondeley Award: Ciaran Carson, Michael Donaghy, Lavinia Greenlaw, Jackie Kay
- David Cohen Prize: Thom Gunn (joint winner with novelist Beryl Bainbridge) (joint winners)
- Eric Gregory Award: Jen Hadfield, Zoë Brigley, Paul Batchelor, Olivia Cole, Sasha Dugdale, Anna Woodford
- Forward Poetry Prize Best Collection: Ciaran Carson, Breaking News (The Gallery Press); Best First Collection: A. B. Jackson, Fire Stations (Anvil Press)
- Queen's Gold Medal for Poetry: U. A. Fanthorpe
- T. S. Eliot Prize (United Kingdom and Ireland): Don Paterson, Landing Light
- Whitbread Award for poetry: Mark Haddon, The Curious Incident of the Dog in the Night-Time

=== United States ===
- Agnes Lynch Starrett Poetry Prize awarded to David Shumate for High Water Mark
- American Academy of Arts and Letters Gold Medal in Poetry, W.S. Merwin
- Bernard F. Connors Prize for Poetry, Julie Sheehan for “Brown-headed Cow Birds”
- Bollingen Prize for Poetry, Adrienne Rich
- Brittingham Prize in Poetry, Brian Teare, The Room Where I Was Born
- Frost Medal: Lawrence Ferlinghetti
- National Book Award for poetry: C.K. Williams, The Singing
- Poet Laureate Consultant in Poetry to the Library of Congress: Louise Glück appointed
- Pulitzer Prize for Poetry (United States): Paul Muldoon, Moy Sand and Gravel
- Rhysling Award:
  - Charles Sapiak & Mike Allen, Epochs in Exile: A Fantasy Trilogy (Long Form, tie)
  - Sonya Taffe, Matlacihuatl's Gift (Long Form, tie)
  - Ruth Berman, Potherb Gardening (Short Form)
- Robert Fitzgerald Prosody Award: George T. Wright
- Ruth Lilly Poetry Prize: Linda Pastan
- Wallace Stevens Award: Richard Wilbur
- Whiting Awards: Major Jackson
- William Carlos Williams Award: Gary Young, No Other Life, Judge: Angela Jackson
- Fellowship of the Academy of American Poets: Li-Young Lee

== Deaths ==
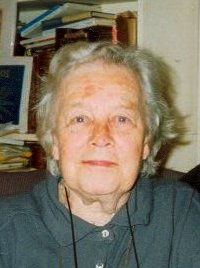
English poet Kathleen Jessie Raine

Birth years link to the corresponding "[year] in poetry" article:

- March 16 – Susan McGowan (born 1907), Australian poet
- June 28 – Clem Christesen (born 1911), Australian poet, founding editor of Meanjin
- July 6 – Kathleen Raine (born 1908), English poet and literary scholar
- July 8 – Subhash Mukhopadhyay (born 1919), Bengali poet
- July 9 – Josephine Jacobsen (born 1908), American poet, short story writer and critic
- July 15 – Roberto Bolaño, 50 (born 1953), Chilean fiction writer, poet and essayist, liver disease
- August 7 – F. T. Prince (born 1912), South African-English poet and academic
- September 3 – Alan Dugan (born 1923), American poet
- October 26 – Heinz Piontek (born 1925), German writer
- November 3 – Rasul Gamzatov, 80 (born 1923), Avarian/Soviet/Russian poet, "People's poet of Dagestan"
- November 27 – Talal al-Rasheed, 41?, Saudi poet
- December 12 – Fadwa Tuqan, 86 (born 1917), Palestinian poet
- December 23 – John Newlove (born 1923), Canadian poet

== See also ==
- Poetry
- List of years in poetry
- List of poetry awards

== Notes ==
- "A Timeline of English Poetry" Web page of the Representative Poetry Online Web site, University of Toronto
