= Meep =

Meep or MEEP may refer to:

== Fiction ==
- Beep the Meep, a fictional alien who appeared in the Doctor Who weekly comic strip
- The Meeps, a fictional anthropomorphic animal band/dance troupe created by American Idol showrunner Simon Fuller
- Meep (American Horror Story), a character in the television series American Horror Story
- Meeps, an alien life form depicted in the War Against the Chtorr series of novels by David Gerrold
- "Meep", the primary vocabulary of Beaker on The Muppet Show
- "Meep meep", an imitation of the sound produced by Looney Tunes character Road Runner
- Meep, a 2015 picture book by Andy Geppert

== Science and technology ==
- Meep!, a computer tablet made by the company Oregon Scientific
- Mir Environmental Effects Payload
- Meep (software)

== See also ==
- Beep, beep (disambiguation)
