= Lost Property (Moloney novel) =

2005 young adult novel

- Author: James Moloney
- Language: English
- Publication date: 2005

Lost Property (ISBN 9780670029433) is a young adult novel by Australian author James Moloney. First published in 2005, it is about a teenage boy in Sydney who loses direction in his life. It was a Children's Book Council of Australia Honour Book for 2006, and was also shortlisted for the ABPA Book Design Awards, the Children's Peace Literature Award 2007, the New South Wales State Literary Award and the NSW Premier's Literary Award.

Moloney wrote the following about Lost Property :

... up to a third of Australia’s young people are educated in schools professing a religious base and more Australian’s than not claim belief in some kind of creator/deity. One of the things my protagonist, Josh Tambling has lost in Lost Property, is his religious faith... But Josh’s creation of himself as a human being has been built more solidly on his spirituality than he realises. He’s vaguely aware of feeling empty at his core and he doesn’t like it. His need to replace that sense of the spiritual with something that means just as much lies at the heart of this novel ... that it’s what is lost within in him that he’s searching for.

== Synopsis ==
The book is about Josh Tambling who is well loved and cared for by his Mum and Dad. Josh and his mates have formed a band and dream of being rock gods. But when he lands a holiday job in the Lost Property Office at Sydney's Central station, Josh starts to sense the loss of some important things in his life. One is that his brother Michael has drifted off and will not let anyone know where he is. The stress this is putting on his family grows, so when Josh discovers a clue to Michael's whereabouts while handling lost items in his work, he sets out to find him.

Josh Tambling is the son of a famous footballer and a very well known radio station host. He is in a band with his mates. He has a girlfriend named Alicia. During the holidays he works at the Lost Property office. On his first day a lady requests a coat and Josh gives it to her but she doesn't find what she really wanted, a brooch. Josh's supervisor, Clive, explains that sometimes they separate clothing and other valuable items. Clive finds the brooch in that was kept in the safe and it belongs to the woman. She is overcome with emotion and explains that even though it is of little monetary value, it is a family heirloom and very important to her. Here, Josh realises how important small things can be to people. He goes for a band practice with his boys and they meet his friend Steve's sister, Gemma. The next night Josh goes to Alicia's house and goes into the pool. They play around and look at the stars and Josh confesses that he believes that the universe is big for no reason. His trust in God slowly decreases. He goes to work again and in the afternoon goes for another band practice. He talks to Gemma about the same conversation he had with Alicia and she responds that there is more out there than just a big waste of space. The band decide to go to The Domain for New Year's Eve. When they go Josh sits next to Alicia and his friend Neven sits next to Gemma and their relationship is revealed.

That evening Josh finds himself dwelling on the last thing Clive said to him, which was “Don’t forget, two in the hand is worth three in the bush”. Josh is in the train home when he answers to a calling, he starts picking up all the lost plastic in his carriage then follows on to do all the carriages. He continues to do this on another train, then another until he reaches Cronulla Station. There was not a train until 5:30am. He was lost.

== Characters ==
Pam Macintyre writes,

This is terrific book for examination as there are few clear cut situations: Moloney does not deal in moral absolutes and we the reader are invited to make up our minds about the characters, their motivations, the effects of their actions.

Josh Tamling. Josh is the narrator of the story, a young man from a good family. He has lost his belief in God and is feeling lost. He sees the joy people experience it the Lost Property Office when finding something they had thought lost is found. He feels that finding his brother Michael will have the same result but discovers that each person has to make their own journey.

Michael Tamling. Michael is the older brother who was thrown out of the home for his rebellious behavior. He has changed and is a different person but he doesn't want to contact his parents and renew their relationship.

Phil Tamling. Phil is the boys father, a good man who enjoys sport and is supported by his religion. He knows where Michael is but doesn't contact him or tell Josh or his wife.

== Themes ==
- Betrayal
- Interpersonal relationships
- Spirituality
- Family
- Humanism
- Religious belief
- Rites of passage
