= BEP =

BEP may refer to:

- Behoa language of Sulawesi, Indonesia (ISO 639-3 code: bep)
- Bellary Airport, India (IATA code BEP)
- Best efficiency point, the point on a pump curve that yields the most efficient operation
- BitTorrent enhancement proposal
- Break-even point, where any difference between plus or minus or equivalent changes side
- Bureau of Engraving and Printing of the US Treasury
- Black Eyed Peas, an American hip-hop group
- BOP clade of grasses, formerly BEP clade
- Bell–Evans–Polanyi principle, a relation between activation energies and reaction energies in chemistry
- Brookfield Renewable Energy Partners, LP, NYSE:BEP
- Blocul Electoral Patriotic, the Romanian name of the Patriotic Electoral Bloc, a pro-Russian left-wing electoral alliance in Moldova

== Medicine ==
- Benign enlargement of the prostate, or benign prostatic hyperplasia, noncancerous increase in size of the prostate
- BEP chemotherapy consisting of bleomycin, etoposide and cisplatin for testicular, ovarian and other cancers

== People ==
- Bep Schrieke (1890–1945), Dutch politician
- Bep Stenger (1922–2016), aid worker who resisted the Japanese in the Dutch East Indies
- Bep Voskuijl (1919–1983), Dutch secretary who helped conceal Anne Frank
- Bep Vriend (born 1946), Dutch bridge player

== See also ==
- Beep (disambiguation)
- BEF (disambiguation)
