= Master of the Books =

2007 novel by James Moloney

- Author: James Moloney
- Language: English
- Genre: Fantasy novel
- Published: 1 June 2007 HarperCollins
- Publication place: Australia
- Media type: Print (Paperback)
- Pages: 414
- ISBN: 978-0-207-20083-0
- OCLC: 174091853
- Preceded by: The Book of Lies
- Followed by: The Book from Baden Dark

Master of the Books is the second novel in a fantasy series by James Moloney. It is the sequel to The Book of Lies, which was released on 25 May 2004.

== Plot ==
The book mostly deals with Fergus's attempts to kill Damon, who tracks Damon all over the Mortal Kingdoms. When Marcel puts a curse over Elster to prove that Fergus would never kill his father, the curse backfires on Fergus, putting him in mortal danger, and Marcel journeys to Noam to try and undo the curse. However, along the way, he discovers that Fergus is not the only person that needs Marcel's help.
