= Beep =

Beep may refer to:

== Science and technology ==
- Beep (sound), a single tone onomatopoeia, generally made by a computer or a machine
- BEEP, a network protocol framework
- Beep (locomotive), a locomotive built in 1970
- Beep (smart card), contactless card payment scheme in the Philippines initially intended for use in railway stations and some buses.

== Entertainment ==
- Beep (short story), a 1954 novelette by James Blish
- "Beep" (The Pussycat Dolls song), a 2006 song performed by the Pussycat Dolls
- "Beep!!", a 2011 song performed by Superfly
- "Beep" (Bobby Valentino song), a 2008 song performed by Bobby Valentino
- "Beep", a 2022 song performed by M.I.A. from Mata
- Beep (video game), a 2011 2D-platforming action and adventure game by Big Fat Alien
- "Beep" (Not Going Out), a 2023 television episode
- Beep: A Documentary History of Game Sound, a 2016 documentary by Karen Collins
- Gemaga, a Japanese video game magazine once known as Beep
- Beep (film), a 2026 Indian film

== Other ==
- Beep (soft drink), a former Canadian fruit drink
- Beep test, oxygen uptake measuring multi-stage fitness test
- Basis point, one part per ten thousand
- BEEPS, Business Environment and Enterprise Performance Survey
- Beep, an informal nickname for borough presidents in New York City.

== See also ==
- Beep, beep (disambiguation)
- BEP (disambiguation)
- Beeb (disambiguation)
- Beeper (disambiguation)
