= Ullin =

Ullin as a personal name can refer to:

- Ullin, in Germanic paganism, the female counterpart of Ullr in the theorized fertility pair Ullr and Ullin; or referring to the form Ullinn found in placenames
- Ullin Place (1924–2000), British philosopher and psychologist
- Albert Ullin (1930–2018), German-Australian bookseller, founder of Australia's first children's bookstore

Ullin as a place name can refer to:

- Ullin, Illinois
- Glen Ullin, North Dakota
- Ullin, Alberta
