= Qaisra Shahraz =

British-Pakistani novelist and scriptwriter

Qaisra Shahraz MBE is a British-Pakistani novelist and scriptwriter.

Shahraz is a Fellow of the Royal Society of Arts and a former director of Gatehouse Books, publishing books written by students for Skills of Life classes. She is a member of the Pakistani community in the UK. She has hosted many workshops and training sessions on "Quality in Education" in Pakistan and India through the British Council. Her work is mostly focused on the diversity of mankind exploring aspects of racial, gender, and cultural divides. In 2016 she won the Lifetime Achiever Award at the National Diversity Awards held at Liverpool's Anglican Cathedral.

== Early life ==
Qaisra Shahraz was born in Pakistan in 1958 and raised in England. She has lived in Manchester since nine. She obtained three degrees [BA honours in English literature classical civilization from The University of Manchester as well as two master's degree of Europe literature and scriptwriting for University of Salford. She is also a screenwriter}. She worked as an advisor for the University of Lancaster, as well as a college inspector and a journalist. She also obtained higher degree in Islamic studies in order to enhance her knowledge in cultural, religious and historical prospectives.

== Career ==
Qaisra Shahraz career ranges from teaching, teacher training, lectures, college inspector of Ofsted and adult learning inspectorate.

Shahraz writes on women issues and is inspired by ordinary people but never uses them as a fictional character in her books. In Dawn interview she says:

"I never use real people in my books. I don't think it is fair to them to be fictional characters"

A critical analysis of her work appeared in The Holy and the Unholy: Critical Essays on Qaisra Shahraz’s Fiction (2011).

Qaisra Shahraz has been published in magazines and newspapers including The Times. Originally she concentrated on short stories, but progressed to writing longer works. Her novel The Holy Woman was published in multiple countries and languages. She wrote a drama serial Dil he to hay that reached Pakistan Television (PTV). This drama series was nominated for five awards in Pakistan television and received two awards.

Her early creation, "A pair of Jeans" was published in the UK in 1988. It explores the issue of clothing, female modesty, multiple identities and cultural clashes. In 1989, it was picked by a German Professor/Editor, Dr. Liesel Hermes, as a literary text to be used in German schools for the German Abitur examination. She has been active in Cochin for inaugurating the DC international book fair.

Shahraz was appointed Member of the Order of the British Empire (MBE) in the 2020 Birthday Honours for services to gender equality and cultural learning.

== Works ==
"A Pair of Jeans" has been published twelve times, including eight in Germany and was featured in the local literary scenes of many other countries.

=== Novels ===
- The Holy Woman (2002)
- Typhoon (2007)
- Revolt (2013)

=== Short stories ===
Publication-UK

- "A Pair of Jeans"
- "Holding Out"
- "Black And Priceless"
- "What Big Eyes You Have Got"
- "Acclaim Magazine"
- "No Limits"
- "Rabbits English"
- "Dragon Fly In The Sun"
- "Pakistani Writing in English"
- "The Elopement"

Publication-Germany

- "A Pair of Jeans"
- "Raabits English" (1994) Cornelsen
- "One Language Many Voices" (2005–2006) Cornelsen, Diesterweg, Klett, Schönigh, Stark, Reclam etc. Other Short Stories
- "Invitations To Literature" (1990)
- "Writing Women" – Twentieth Century Short Stories (1991)
- "Emerging India" co-authored textbook for literature (2008), Diesterweg

Publication-Holland

- "Tyfoon" (2003) Van Gennep (Dutch).

Publication-India

- "The Holy Woman" (2008) Penguin / Yatra Books (Hindi, Urdu & English)
- "Typhoon" (2008) Penguin / Yatra Books (Hindi, Urdu & English)
- "And the World Changed" – Writing by Pakistani women Writers (2005) Women Unlimited
- "Neither Night nor Day" – 13 Stories by Women Writers from Pakistan (2007), HarperCollins.
- "Typhoon" – Malayalam edition, Dc books (2011)
- "Jeans" – Short story "A Pair of Jeans" – Malayalam version (2010)

Publication-Indonesia

- "Perempuan Suci" (2006), Mizan Pustaka
- "Perempuan Terluka" (2007) Mizan Pustaka

Publication-Pakistan

- "Dragonfly in the Sun" (1997) Oxford University Press
- "The Holy Woman" (2002), Alhamra (English)
- "And the World Changed" – Writing by Pakistani Women Writers (2007) Oxford University Press
- "Pakistani literature & Women Writers of Pakistan" (2007)
- "Pakistani Literature in English" (2007) Academy of Letters
- "Typhoon" (2003), Alhamra (English)
- "Zarri Bano" (Urdu Version) of The Holy Woman (2013)

Publication-Turkey

- "Kutsal Kadin" (2005), Truva
- "Tayfun" (2005), Truva

== Recognition ==
- 1988 Commonword Prize (New Horizons, New Spheres)
- 1994 Ian St James Award (Perchavah)
- 2001 The Holy Woman – Best Book of the Month, Bradford Waterstone's
- 2002 Asian Women of Achievement Awards (Arts category) (shortlist)
- 2003 Jubilee Award The Holy Woman
- 2003 Muslim News Awards for Excellence (Arts category) (shortlist)
- 2004 Pakistan Television Awards Dil Hee to Hai (The Heart Is It)
- 2011 The Holy Woman screenplay shortlisted for Muslim Writers Award
- 2012 Recognised as being one of 100 influential Pakistani women in Pakistan Power 100 List
- 2016 National Diversity Awards: Lifetime Achiever Awards (Won)

== See also ==
- List of British Pakistanis
