= Touch Me (novel) =

2000 novel by Australian author James Moloney

- Author: James Moloney
- Cover artist: Peter Evans
- Language: English
- Genre: Young adult novel
- Publisher: University of Queensland Press
- Publication date: 2000
- Publication place: Australia
- Pages: 243 pp
- ISBN: 0-7022-3151-7
- OCLC: 45151610
- LC Class: PZ7.M7353 To 2000

Touch Me (ISBN 0702231517) is a novel written by Australian author James Moloney. It was published in April 2000 by University of Queensland Press. The National Library of Australia holds eleven editions of this title including as a book, braille, sound recording, MP3 and electronic resource. It is also included in the Kerry White collection of Australian children's books.

James Moloney wrote that the characters were not based on any particular individual but several events in his life influenced him:

I had been thinking a great deal about the nature of masculinity. How does a man act in this day and age? After 30 years of feminist influence, are new things expected of men? Have men responded to the challenge for change in the face of differing roles and expectations among women? I wanted to explore this in a novel from the point of view of young adults. I thought it would be interesting to make my character a footballer, with all the baggage that this can sometimes bring - the bravado, the camaraderie along narrow lines, the expectations of loyalty.

Of course, I had to challenge Xavier and Nuala Magee seemed like the appropriate young woman to do it.

== Plot summary ==
Touch Me tells the story of a young Australian named Xavier McLachlan, who is in his final year of high school. A keen sportsman, his aim for the year is to be selected in the school Rugby team and help his friends and teammates win the first premiership in twenty years. All is going according to plan until he meets Nuala Magee, an unusual girl with her own agenda; she cross-dresses, and acts in a deliberately confrontational manner towards boys. Xavier is intrigued by her and against the advice of his friends, becomes very close to her, eventually starting a relationship with her. Xavier also befriends a new boy, Alex Murray and this friendship helps Xavier begin to change his ideas about what it means to be a man. The tension between Xavier and his friends begins to isolate him and when he betrays Nuala out of weakness, and a tragedy befalls Alex Murray, he is faced with difficult decisions about who he is and what he holds most dear.

== Characters ==
Xavier McLachlan - The main character of the story is a teenage footballer who always strives to win in every game. He attends St. Matthews College, an all-boys school in a large Australian city.

Nuala "Boong" Magee - An unusual and rather unsettling girl whom Xavier meets at a train station and finds interesting.

Alex Murray - A keen and thoughtful student who Xavier befriends and who helps him find out more about Nuala.

Brother Allbecker - Deputy Principal at Xavier's school who provides useful advice and encouragement to him.

Ben Preston - the St Matthew's Rugby Coach brought in by the Old Boys Association especially to win the premiership. He is 'old school' and loses sight of responsibility to the boys in his care.

Scott Watson - St Matthew's football team captain and Xavier's best friend until events between himself and Nuala cause them to fight.

== Issues and themes ==
- Coming of age
- Guilt
- Sportsmanship
- Interpersonal relationship
- Loyalty
- Bullying
- Death
- Emotional trauma
- Betrayal
- Identity
- Sport
- Winning at all costs
- Power and gossip
- Sexism
- Sexual stereotypes
- Mateship/Friendship
- Homophobia
- Revenge

== Awards and nominations ==
- Won the Victorian Premier's Prize (Premier's Literary Awards) in 2001.
- Winner Children Peace Literature Prize 2001
- Shortlisted for Children's Book Council of Australia Book of the Year Award for Older readers 2001.
