= National Centre for Australian Children's Literature =

Australian children's literature archive

Coordinates: 35.238256°S 149.083609°E

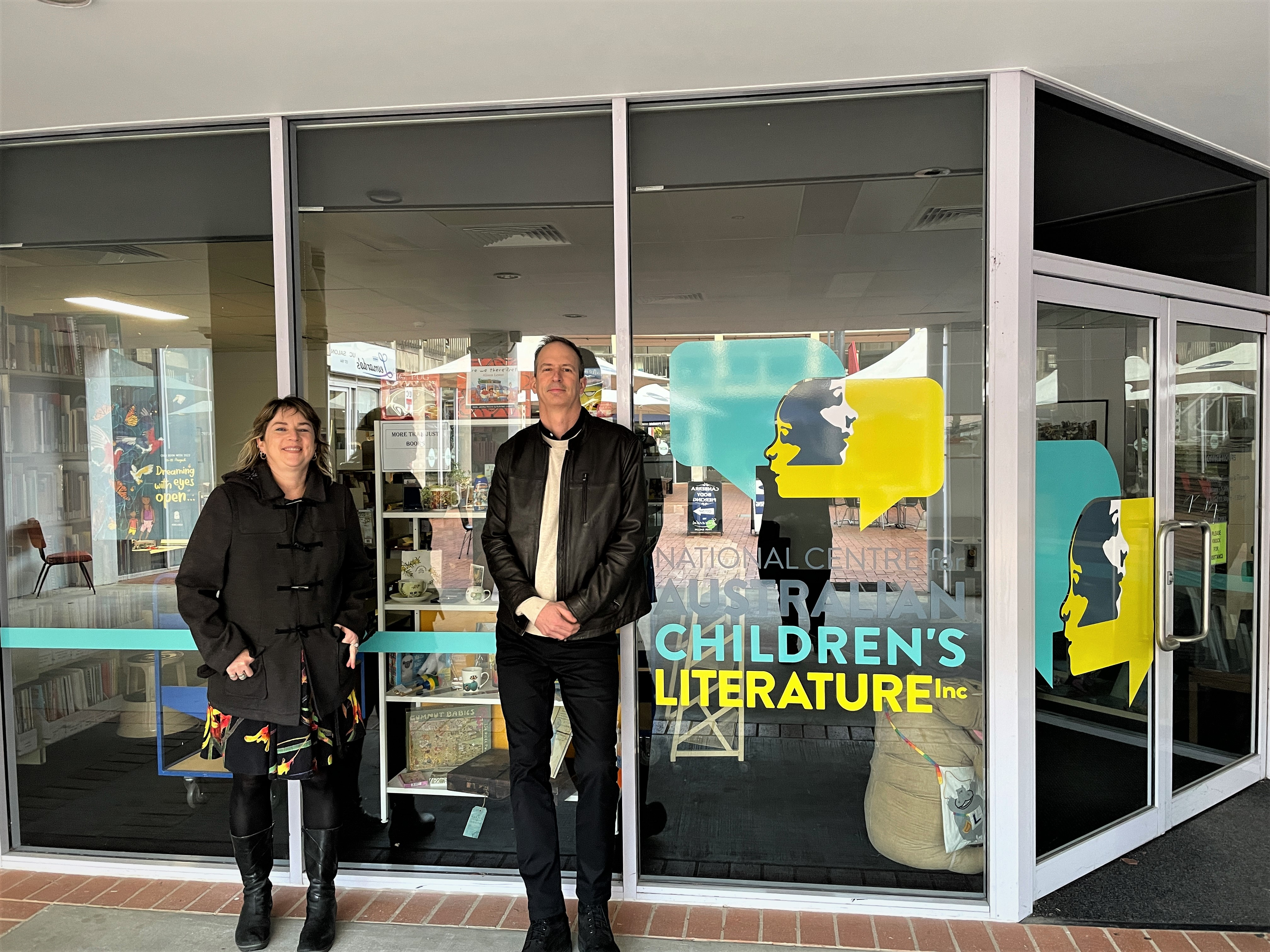
Professors from University of Canberra outside the National Centre for Australian Children's Literature

The National Centre for Australian Children's Literature Inc, formerly known as the Lu Rees Archives, is a not-for-profit study and research centre housed at the University of Canberra. The founding donation was by Lu Rees. Its director in 2018 was Dr Belle Alderman who is an Emeritus Professor of Children's Literature.

== History ==
In 1974, Lu Rees, then President of the ACT Branch of The Children's Book Council of Australia instigated a collection of biographical files on Australian children’s authors and illustrators and a collection of their works.

In 1980, the collection of 1000 books and 50 research files, named the Lu Rees Archives, were moved to the Canberra College of Advanced Education (now the University of Canberra). In 1981, Australian publishers agreed to donate copies of their children’s books, a practice which has continued.

== Management ==
From 1983 till 1990, the Centre, or the Lu Rees Archives as it was then known, was managed by the Lu Rees Archives Management Committee. In July, the University and ACT Branch of The Children's Book Council of Australia signed a formal agreement outlining roles and responsibilities of both parties in the management of the Archives.

In 2012 the Archives became an incorporated body in the ACT and a Board was established. A Deed of Agreement was signed transferring the responsibility for the Archives to the new Board.

In October 2015, the Lu Rees Archives changed their name to the National Centre for Australian Children’s Literature Inc.

An agreement outlining the respective roles and responsibilities exists between the University of Canberra and The National Centre for Australian Children’s Literature. This agreement is reviewed and renewed every five years.

In 2018 Dr Belle Alderman who is an Emeritus Professor of Children's Literature was the director of the National Centre for Australian Children's Literature.

== Collections ==
=== Collections ===
The Centre has a Collection Development Policy which outlines the scope, conservation, use and management of the Centre’s holdings.

The Centre collects material by, and about Australian children’s authors and illustrators. The collection includes books, manuscripts, artworks, artifacts, journals, rare books, reference material, theses and ephemera related to the books. The Centre’s book collection holds over 50,000 volumes including different editions, reprints, and translations of published works. The Centre also holds some 5000 translations of Australian children’s books in over 68 languages

Important to the research function of the Centre is the collection of Research files. These contain 30 different categories of material on more than 550 individual authors and illustrators of Australian children’s books

The Centre has also compiled Finding Aids to the donated papers from several Australian children’s literature creators.

The Centre has been registered to receive donations under the Australian Cultural Gifts Programme since 1988 and received its first donation in 1992.

=== Artworks ===
A large part of the Centre’s collections is its holdings of original artwork, both final and preliminary as well as documentation that showcases the creative process involved in the production of a children’s book. The artwork is numbered and described in the NCACL Artwork Frameworks.

The John Barrow collection of 130 framed original artworks was donated to the Centre in 2016.

Since 1984, the Centre has stored, conserved, and managed, on behalf of The Children’s Book Council of Australia, the original artwork created by various artists for the annual celebration of Children’s Book Week. In 2017, an exhibition of this artwork and related material was held at the University of Canberra.

=== Accessing and sharing the collection ===
All books in the Centre’s collection are listed in the Centre’s catalogue which can be accessed through the Centre’s website.

The Centre has created two subject orientated databases of books.

The NCACL Cultural Diversity Database was launched in 2019. This lists Australian children’s and young adult books that feature Australia’s culturally diverse population and understanding the similarities and differences between cultures.

The NCACL Aboriginal and/or Torres Strait Islander Resource was launched in 2020 This resource has over 500 books by, for and about First Nations people. Stage One of the Resource was initially aimed at Early Childhood and was funded by the Australian Government Department of Education, Skills and Employment. The Resource has been extended to contain books up to and including material for secondary students.

The Centre’s website lists other resources created to assist in accessing material on specific subjects or the Centre’s holdings in particular genres including graphic novels and verse novels.

From 2000 to 2014 the Centre indexed children’s literature publications for The Australian Literature Resource (AustLit). At the launch of AustLit, the Centre provided 12,000 bibliographic records including indexed reviews and articles on Australian children’s literature as the basis for AustLit’s children’s literature records.

== Outreach ==
The Centre conducts a range of outreach activities to share the collection and knowledge of the creative process.

The Centre is involved with the University’s study programme with undergraduate and graduate students from several disciplines.

=== Exhibitions and Seminars ===
The Centre holds exhibitions of artworks and other material from its collection. A number have been in collaboration with other institutions such as the ACT Public Libraries, IBBY Australia, the Belconnen Arts Centre and the National Library of Australia. In 2018 Dr Belle Alderman the centre's director organised an exhibition at the University of Canberra of children's book illustrations. Artists included May Gibbs, Kylie Dunstan, Vivienne Goodman, Graeme Base, Bob Graham, Shaun Tan and Kerry Argent.

The Centre also loans its artwork collections to regional and state libraries and galleries throughout Australia

=== Publications ===
The Centre produces publications that provide information about its work.

From 1981 - 2013 the Centre published an annual journal The Lu Rees Archives: Notes, Books and Authors. This ceased in 2013 and was replaced by an on-line journal ‘Behind the Imagined: The Journal of the National Centre for Australian Children’s Literature’.

In 2014, for its fortieth birthday the Centre published Showcasing Treasures which details the history of the Centre, its collections, and its activities.

The Centre publishes on its website its Annual Reports, a quarterly E-Newsletter and various information brochures.

== Funding ==
The Centre is a ‘not-for-profit’ organisation. The Centre receives in kind support from the University of Canberra as part of its ongoing agreement with the University.

In 1988, the Centre was granted deductible gift recipient status with eligibility to receive gifts under the Australian Government’s Cultural Gifts Program

== Volunteers ==
Since the Centre’s establishment in 1974, volunteers have contributed to its growth and development. In recent years, the hours contributed by the Centre’s volunteers is the equivalent of 4.5 full time staff.

== Access ==
The National Centre for Australian Children’s Literature’s website provides information on how to access the catalogue, the Centre’s databases, and other resources such as the artwork, and author/illustrator files.

The Centre is based at the University of Canberra and is open 9-5 Monday, Tuesday, and Thursday. Access at other times can be arranged by appointment.

== See also ==
- AustLit: The Australian Literature Resource
- Australian literature
- Category:Australian children's writers
- Children's Book Council of Australia
- Children's literature
- University of Canberra Library
- Aora Children's Literature Research Centre
