= Andy Geppert =

Australian illustrator and children's author

- Born: 1976 (age 49–50) Nambour, Queensland, Australia
- Occupation: Illustrator; Author; Graphic designer
- Genre: Children's literature Picture books
- Years active: 2000s–present
- Notable works: Little Big Tree; Meep; Joy
- Notable awards: Crichton Award for New Illustrators (2010)

Andy Geppert is an Australian illustrator and author of children's books. He won the Crichton Award for new illustrators for his work on Little Big Tree in 2010. His follow up picture book Meep was selected as a Notable Book by the Children's Book Council of Australia (CBCA) in 2016.

== Early life and education ==
Geppert was born in Nambour Queensland in 1976 and grew up on Queensland's Sunshine Coast. He studied graphic design at Design College and represented Australia at the Cannes Young Creative competition in 2001.

== Career ==
He has spent 14 years in the advertising industry working across multiple roles including senior art director, head of art, and two creative director titles.

In 2010 Geppert was jointly awarded the Crichton Award for new Australian illustrator for his work on Little Big Tree written by Tim Brown. In 2015 he released his first solo picture book tilted Meep. The First edition hardcover with dust jacket was published by Tiny Owl Workshop and was selected as a Notable Book by the Children's Book Council of Australia (CBCA) in 2016. It features a baby peacock who gives away his feathers to help his friends feel better about the way they look. It's a story about kindness, friendship and ultimately being happy with the oddities and beautiful imperfections that make you, you and me, me. Or as the author says (inside the dust jacket): For all the people who answer NO to the following question: Are you beautiful?

A year later Geppert released his second picture book along a similar theme of creating picture books with heart titled Joy, published in hardcover by Tiny Owl Workshop. It is picture book made for grandchildren and their grandparents. A granny rainbow wanders along seemingly unaware of the incredible transformations happening right behind her. If only she'd stop and look back.

== Bibliography ==
- Little Big Tree written by Tim Brown, Andy Geppert (illustrator), Kidiki Publishing, 2010
- Meep written and illustrated by Andy Geppert, Tiny Owl Workshop, 2015
- Joy written and illustrated by Andy Geppert, Tiny Owl Workshop, 2016
- Best Bug 2018 written and illustrated by Andy Geppert, Tiny Owl Workshop, 2018
- Backyard Birdies written and illustrated by Andy Geppert, Lothian, 2021
- Australian Backyard Buddies written and illustrated by Andy Geppert, Lothian, 2022
- The Baloon Blow Up written and illustrated by Andy Geppert, Lothian, 2023

== Awards ==
- 2010 Crichton Award
- 2016 Notable Book CBCA
