= Albert Ullin =

German Australian bookseller (1930 – 2018)

Albert Ullin OAM
- Born: 29 April 1930; Frankfurt, Germany
- Died: 12 September 2018 (aged 88); Melbourne, Victoria, Australia
- Citizenship: Australian
- Occupation: Bookseller

Albert Henry Ullin OAM (29 April 1930 – 12 September 2018) was a German Australian bookseller and the founder of Australia's first children's bookstore, The Little Bookroom. He nurtured emerging children's writers and illustrators.

== Early years ==
Ullin was born in Frankfurt, and arrived in Melbourne in 1939 as a nine-year-old, escaping pre-war Germany via Italy with his family.

== Career ==
Ullin developed his interest in children's picture-books while working for booksellers Robertson & Mullens in Melbourne. Ullin promoted Australian children's books at the Bologna Book Fair. Ullin served as judge on both the Victorian Premier’s Literary Award and the Children's Book Council of Australia Crichton Award.

=== The Little Bookroom ===
Ullin founded Australia’s first children’s bookstore, The Little Bookroom, opening on 13 October 1960. Ullin sold the business to staff in 2004. The bookstore was first established in the Metropol Arcade before moving to an Elizabeth St location, opposite the GPO. The store later relocated to Carlton with a small branch at Degraves Street. The bookstore was named after Eleanor Farjeon's book of short stories "The Little Bookroom" and Ullin wrote to Farjeon to request the use of the name and to illustrator Edward Ardizzone requesting an illustration to be the logo for the bookstore.

=== Writing fellowships ===
Ullin was the National Mentorship Coordinator for the May Gibbs Literature Trust which supports Australian creators of books for children through fellowships and residencies for authors and illustrators.

=== Children's Book Council of Australia ===
Ullin held various positions in the Children's Book Council of Australia Victoria Branch between 1979 and 1988. Ullin served as judge on both the Victorian Premier’s Literary Award and the CBCA Crichton Award for New Illustrators. In 2009, he was awarded the Leila St John Award by CBCA Victoria and an honorary lifetime membership, in recognition of his services to children’s literature in Victoria.

== Awards ==
- 1986 Dromkeen Medal for outstanding achievement in the advancement of Australian children's and young adult literature
- 1997 Medal of the Order of Australia for services to children's literature in Australia and beyond
- 2009 lifetime achievement award by the Australian Booksellers Association
- 2009 Leila St John Award by the Children's Book Council of Australia, Victorian branch
- Honorary Life Member of the Children’s Book Council of Australia

== Legacy ==
Ullin donated his personal collection of Australian children’s book illustrations to the National Gallery of Victoria. Ullin created the Ullin Prize for Children's Illustration at the Wheeler Centre for Books Writing and Ideas. The inaugural prize was awarded to Andrew McLean in 2020 in recognition of his 40 year career in book illustration. Jane Tanner and Judith Rossell won in 2022 and 2024 respectively.
