= Aora Children's Literature Research Centre =

Australian children's literature collection

Aora Children’s Literature Research Centre NSW Inc. was a volunteer managed research collection of children's literature that existed from 1992 - 2013 in Sydney, New South Wales.

The collection was established to preserve a perspective on Australian literary heritage, including a selection of books children in New South Wales had grown up reading since white settlement. The collection was not limited to Australian titles and included a professional collection of books and reviewing journals. The material in the collection had been sourced from donations by New South Wales public libraries, New South Wales Department of Education and Training Offices at Ryde, the New South Wales School Magazine office and private individuals. The collection included more than 20,000 items.

The AORA patron was Dr Maurice Saxby AM, a world-renowned authority on Australian Children's Literature.

== History ==
Aora can trace its history back to the 1960s when Dr Margaret Trask AM, a lecturer in children's literature, saved discarded books from public libraries to be a historical resource collection for her students. This collection was returned to Sydney public libraries in 1992 and a group of former children's librarians maintained the collection as it expanded with donations from the New South Wales Department of Education offices at Ryde, bibliographer Dr Kerry White, Penguin publishing, authors, public library deleted materials and individual donors.

Housed at St Peters Public School in Sydney, the collection was jointly supported by the Metropolitan Public Libraries Association and New South Wales Department of Education and Training from 1992 until 2006. In 2008 ownership of the collection was handed over to a community volunteer committee in partnership with Department of Education and Training, New South Wales. A new management committee was established and work began to develop a plan for the future. The aim of the collection was to make it the children's literature research collection for New South Wales, available to students and researchers of children's literature and the general public. A newsletter was produced and circulated to public library librarians, school librarians, teachers, academics, publishers, bookshops and parents of students at the school. A business plan for its future launched by the State Librarian of New South Wales in 2010 was only partly implemented.

Aora closed in December 2013 due to rising insurance costs and low membership. The collection was dispersed into the hands of many individuals.

== See also ==
- Lu Rees Archives
