= Leila St John Award =

Children's literary award in Victoria, Australia

The Leila St John Award is an annual award presented in the Children's Book Council of Australia Awards by the Victorian branch. The award was first made in 1999, the most recent in 2021.

The CBCA Victoria Branch established the award in recognition of the Leila St John, a founding member in the branch. St John was very active in the branch activities and appeals.

To see the history of the CBCA and other CBCA Awards, see: List of CBCA Awards

== Award category and description ==
The Leila St John Award is awarded for services to children's literature in Victoria.

== List of winners ==
Leila St John Award winners
Year	Winner	Ref.
1999	Bea Fincher	
2000	Moira Robinson	
2001	Ann Haddon	
2001	Ann James	
2002	Margaret Dunkle	
2003	Kay Keck	
2004	No Award	
2005	Nell Bell	
2006	No Award	
2007	Anne Hanzl	
2008	Dr. Pam Macintyre	
2009	Albert Ullin OAM	
2010	Pam Horsey	
2011	Eileen Nelson	
2012	No Award	
2013	Kim Yeomans	
2014	Jo Goodman	
2015	Dr. Virginia Lowe	
2016	Geri Coughlin	
2017	Geraldine Woolnough	
2018	Kathy Kozlowski	
2019	No Award	
2020	Christine Oughtred	
2021	Paul Collins	

== See also ==
- List of Australian literary awards
