= The Holy Woman =

Novel written by Pakistani-British Qaisra Shahraz

- First edition
- Author: Qaisra Shahraz
- Language: English
- Genre: Novel
- Publisher: Arcadia Books
- Publication date: 2001
- Publication place: United Kingdom
- Media type: Print (paperback)

The Holy Woman is an English language novel by Pakistani-British novelist Qaisra Shahraz first published in 2001 and is the debut novel of the author. The novel deals with the themes of the deeply rooted issues of a Pakistani society such as women rights, feudalism and feminism. Set in contemporary Pakistan (Sindh), London and Egypt, the story revolves around a 28-years old brave, bold and beautiful Zarri Bano, the daughter of a wealthy landowner who stands against the injustice and shows resilience.

== Plot summary ==
Zarri Bano, a liberal and modern woman from Sindh, falls in love with Sikander, but her influential father disapproves of their relationship. After his son's death, her father forces Zarri to marry the Holy Quran and become the "Holy Woman", an old family tradition. Zarri sacrifices her love and freedom, but ultimately finds a way to challenge this custom and defeats its underlying myth.
