= Dougy =

Novel by James Moloney

- First edition cover
- Author: James Moloney
- Publisher: University of Queensland Press
- Publication date: 1993
- ISBN: 978-0-702-22499-7
- Followed by: Gracey (1994)

Dougy is a 1993 young adult novel written by James Moloney, first published in 1993 by University of Queensland Press. By 2013 the National Library of Australia listed 18 editions of the novel in a variety of formats including book, audio book, braille and e-book. It is the first book in the Gracey trilogy, followed by Gracey (1994) and Angela (1998).

In 1994, Dougy was an Honour Book in the category of Older Readers in the Children's Book Council of Australia Awards. James Moloney taught for 2 years in outback Queensland and his observation from that time developed into the novel. "I watched aboriginal children growing up, the difficulties they faced, the close family relations that mean so much and the ingrained prejudice of the dominant white culture around them." The book is dedicated to Douglas Collins, a student Moloney taught, who collapsed and died during a rugby game.

== Plot summary ==
The story as told by Dougy tells us about an aboriginal family living in a dump in Australia. Dougy is thirteen years old and lives in government subsidised housing with a seldom seen alcoholic father. His sister Gracey is a talented runner who wins a scholarship to a private school and this leads to resentment from the white community who see it as another government handout. The blacks and whites live an uneasy co-existence, but when an alarming incident occurs the underlying racial tension surfaces and violence erupts.

== Themes ==
There are several themes in the book relevant to teenagers and these make it a useful set text in senior schools

- Relationships: between Dougy and Gracey and their family, mistrust between black and white communities; the closeness and support within the black community
- Identity: Dougy and Gracey lack of knowledge of and interest in their Aboriginality
- Racial issues: the uneasy co-existence of the black and white communities; resentment by white of blacks receiving government money; stereotyped attitudes
- Aboriginal Spirituality: connection to the land and stories through the legend of the Moodagudda
