= Children's Book of the Year Award for New Illustrator =

Australian award for children's book illustration

The CBCA Award for New Illustrator (previously Crichton Award for Children's Book Illustration) is one of several awards presented annually by the Children's Book Council of Australia (CBCA).

The award was originally set up from a legacy made to the Victorian Branch of the CBCA by Wallace Raymond Crichton in 1985. The first award was presented in 1988.

In 2019, the award transferred to the CBCA Book of the Year Awards and was renamed the CBCA Award for New Illustrator. It is managed by the national awards committee and funded by the CBCA Awards Foundation.

== Award category and description ==
The CBCA Award for New Illustrator is for recognising new talent in the field of Australian children's book illustration.

== CBCA Award for New Illustrator winners (2019–present) ==
CBCA Award for New Illustrator winners
Year	Illustrator	Title	Ref.
2019	Daniel Gray-Barnett	Grandma Z	
2020	Jasmine Seymour	Baby Business	
2021	Zeno Sworder	This Small Blue Dot	
2022	Michelle Pereira	The Boy Who Tried to Shrink His Name	
2023	Sally Soweol Han	Tiny Wonders	
2024	Erica Wagner	Hope is the Thing	
2025	Sarah Capon	Grow Big, Little Seed	
2026	Eleri Harris	A Loo of One's Own	

== Crichton Award winners (1988–2018) ==
Crichton Award winners
Year	Author	Title	Ref.
1988	Raymond Meeks	The Pheasant and the Kingfisher	
1989	Marilyn Pride	Australian Dinosaurs	
1990	Jeanie Adams	Pigs and Honey	
1991	Grace Fielding	Bip, the Snapping Bungaroo	
1992	Kim Gamble	The Magnificent Nose & Other Marvels	
1993	Donna Leslie	Alitiji in Dreamland	
1994	Jenny Sands	Is it True Grandfather?	
1995	Astri Baker	I Wish I'd Gone to the Moon with Neil Armstrong	
1995	Geoff Kelly	Power and Glory	
1996	Anne Spudvilas	The Race	
1997	Sally Rippin	Fang Fang's Chinese New Year	
1998	Anna Pignataro	I'm in the Sky and I Can't Come Back	
1998	Shaun Tan	The Viewer	
1999	No winner		
2000	Lorette Broekstra	Baby Bear goes to the Zoo	
2001	Caroline Magerl	Grandma's Shoes	
2002	Mini Goss	When Mum was Little	
2003	Naomi Mairou	The Dugong Meadow	
2004	Freya Blackwood	Two Summers	
2005	Declan Lee	Wings	
2006	Jeremy Geddes	The Mystery of Eilean Mor	
2007	Vince Agostino	When elephants lived in the sea	
2008	Anna Walker	Santa’s Aussie Holiday	
2009	Sarah Davis	Mending Lucille	
2010	Andy Geppert	Little Big Tree	
2010	Andrew Joyner	The Terrible Plop	
2011	Clare McFadden	The Flying Orchestra	
2012	Sara Acton	Ben & Duck	
2013	Marc Martin	A Forest	
2014	Graham Byrne	Big Red Kangaroo	
2015	Michael Camilleri	One Minute's Silence	
2016	Allison Colpoys	The Underwater Fancy Dress Parade	
2017	Van T. Rudd	The Patchwork Bike	
2018	Rovina Cai	Tintinnabula	

== See also ==
- List of CBCA Awards
- List of Australian literary awards
