= List of Australian literary awards =

A list of Australian literary awards and prizes:

== Literature ==
- ABC Fiction Award (2005–2009)
- ACT Book of the Year
- ACT Writing and Publishing Awards
- Ada Cambridge Prize
- The Age Book of the Year
- ARA Historical Novel Prize
- Asher Award (2005–2017)
- Australian Book Industry Awards
- Australian Literature Society Gold Medal
- The Australian/Vogel Literary Award
- Banjo Awards (1974–1997)
- Barbara Jefferis Award
- Chief Minister's NT Book Awards, originally Territory Read, from 2009
- Colin Roderick Award (1967-)
- David Unaipon Award
- Deborah Cass Prize for Writing, established 2015 for writers from a migrant background
- Dorothy Hewett Award
- Fogarty Literary Award
- Indie Book Awards (2008-)
- MARION Book Awards
- Melbourne Prize for Literature (2006-)
- Miles Franklin Award (1957-)
- MUD Literary Prize
- Nib Literary Award (fiction or nonfiction)
- Ned Kelly Awards (1996-)
- New South Wales Premier's Literary Awards
- Nita Kibble Literary Award
- Patrick White Award
- Prime Minister's Literary Awards
- Queensland Literary Awards (2012–)
- Queensland Premier's Literary Awards (1999–2011)
- Readings Prize (2014–)
- S. H. Prior Memorial Prize (1934–1946)
- South Australian Literary Awards
- Stella Prize (2013-)
- The Sydney Morning Herald Best Young Australian Novelists
- T. A. G. Hungerford Award
- Tasmanian Premier's Literary Prizes
- TDK Australian Audio Book Awards (1989–1999)
- Vance Palmer Prize for Fiction
- Victorian Premier's Literary Awards, including:
  - Victorian Premier's Literary Award for Indigenous Writing
- Western Australian Premier's Australia-Asia Literary Award (2008 only)
- Western Australian Premier's Book Awards
- Woollahra Digital Literary Award
- Voss Literary Prize

== Short stories ==
- The Age Short Story Award
- Albury City Short Story Award
- Aurealis Awards
  - Best Fantasy Short Story
  - Best Horror Short Story
  - Best Science Fiction Short Story
  - Best Young-Adult Short Story
- Elizabeth Jolley Short Story Prize

== Poetry ==
- Anne Elder Award
- Bruce Dawe National Poetry Prize
- The Blake Poetry Prize
- Christopher Brennan Award
- C. J. Dennis Prize for Poetry
- Grace Leven Prize for Poetry
- Griffith University Josephine Ulrick Poetry Prize
- Gwen Harwood Poetry Prize
- Ipswich Poetry Feast
- Judith Wright Calanthe Award
- Judith Wright Prize
- Kenneth Slessor Prize for Poetry
- MARION Book Awards (ACT)
- Mary Gilmore Award
- Newcastle Poetry Prize
- Peter Porter Poetry Prize
- Philip Hodgins Memorial Medal
- Queen's Gold Medal for Poetry
- The Roland Robinson Literary Award
- Thomas Shapcott Poetry Prize
- Val Vallis Award
- The Vincent Buckley Poetry Prize
- Wesley Michel Wright Prize

== Plays ==
- NSW Philip Parsons Fellowship for Emerging Playwrights (2013–2018; was Philip Parsons Young Playwrights Award 1995–2012)
- Patrick White Playwrights' Award (2000–)
- Queensland Premier's Drama Award (2002-2013?)

== Youth literature ==
- Inky Awards

== Children's books ==
=== Defunct awards ===
- Australian Multicultural Children's Literature Awards, awarded by the Office of Multicultural Affairs from 1991 to 1995

=== Ongoing awards ===
- Children's Book Council of Australia awards
  - Australian Children's Choice Awards
    - Books I Love Best Yearly (BILBY Awards) — CBCA Queensland Branch
    - Canberra's Own Outstanding List (COOL Awards) — CBCA ACT Branch
  - Children's Book of the Year Awards
    - Early Childhood
    - Younger Readers
    - Older Readers
    - Picture Book of the Year
    - New Illustrator (2019–
    - Eve Pownall Award for Information Books
  - Crichton Award for Children's Book Illustration (1988–2018)
  - Dame Annabelle Rankin Award
  - Leila St John Award
  - Nan Chauncy Award
- Children's Peace Literature Award
- DANZ Children's Book Award
- Dromkeen Medal
- Environment Award for Children's Literature, awarded by the Wilderness Society
- Speech Pathology Australia Book of the Year Awards

== History ==
- Australian History Awards
- Chief Minister's Northern Territory Book History Awards
- Ernest Scott Prize
- New South Wales Premier's History Awards (1997–)
- Prime Minister's Prize for Australian History (2007–)
- Victorian Community History Awards (1998–)

== Science fiction, horror, and other speculative fiction ==
- Aurealis Award
- Australian Shadows Award
- Chandler Award
- Ditmar Award

== Crime writing ==
- Davitt Award
- CWA Duncan Laurie Dagger Awards
- Ned Kelly Awards

== Non-fiction ==
- ACT Writing and Publishing Awards
- Educational Publishing Awards Australia
- The Bragg UNSW Press Prize for Science Writing
- Hazel Rowley Literary Fellowship
- The Iremonger Award (2004–2008)
- National Biography Award (1996–)
- Peter Blazey Fellowship
- Walkley Book Award
- Whitley Awards (Australia)

== Other ==
- Barbara Ramsden Award (fiction or nonfiction) (1971–2015)
- Russell Prize (humour)

== See also ==
- Australian literature
- Commonwealth Writers Prize
- List of literary awards
- List of years in Australian literature
