= Jeremy Geddes =

New Zealand photo-realistic painter

- Born: New Zealand
- Education: Victorian College of the Arts, Melbourne
- Occupation: Painter
- Website: http://www.jeremygeddesart.com/

Jeremy Geddes is a photo-realistic painter from Wellington, New Zealand. He is widely known for the Cosmonaut series of paintings, and has illustrated for comic book covers, in collaboration with friend Ashley Wood. Geddes won the Spectrum Gold Award for his cover art for the comic, Doomed. His children's picture book, The Mystery of Eilean Mor, was shortlisted for The Aurealis Awards, won the Crichton Award, and was named as one of CBC Notable Books in 2006.

Geddes is also a gaming enthusiast. He worked for the video games company Torus Games in the early 2000s, creating art for memorable title like Duke Nukem for the Game Boy Color.Game Credits.
