= James Moloney =

Australian children's author (born 1954)

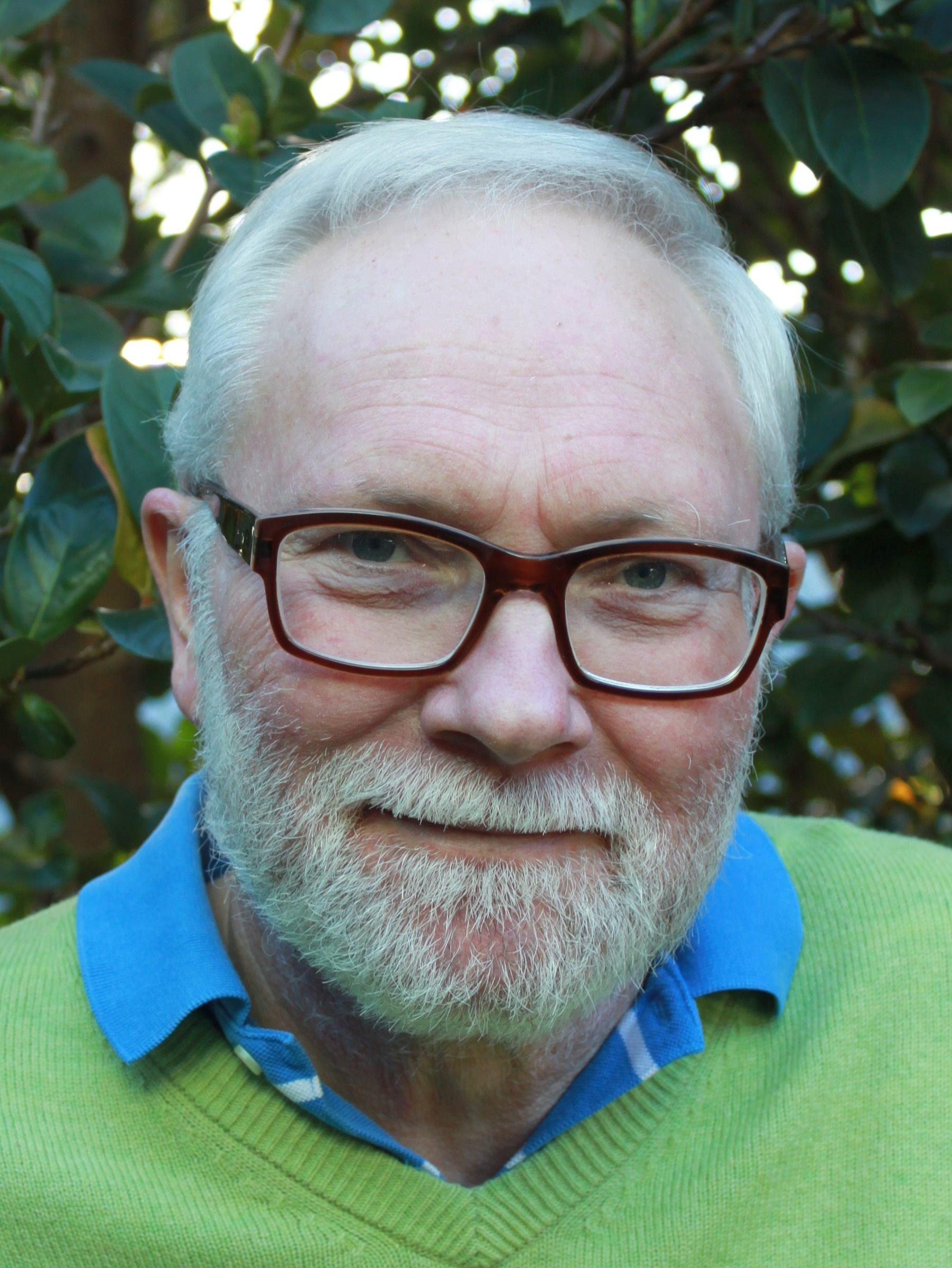
- James Moloney
- Born: 20 September 1954 (age 71); Sydney, New South Wales, Australia
- Occupation: Author
- Writing career
- Notable works: Swashbuckler, A Bridge to Wiseman's Cove, Dougy, Gracey, Angela (Gracey Trilogy), Lost Property

James "Jim" Moloney (born 20 September 1954) is an Australian children's author. A prolific writer whose books span an age range from seven- to seventeen-year-olds, he is best known for his young adult novels. He has been nominated and won awards for his books in the Children's Book Council of Australia Awards. His books have been translated into French, Korean, Lithuanian and Flemish/Dutch.

Moloney was born in Sydney but grew up in Brisbane where he still lives today with his wife, Kate a retired teacher-librarian. He trained as a teacher (Griffith University) and holds diplomas in Teacher–Librarianship and Computer Education. His role as a Teacher Librarian sparked his interest in children's literature and eventually led to his early attempts at writing. His first book, Crossfire, was published in 1992 and he continues to publish. In 1998 he resigned from teaching at Marist College Ashgrove and now writes full-time in a cabin in his backyard affectionately known by the family as 'Dad's Shed'.

His says of his writing

I like to get inside the head of today's adolescents to connect with the passion they have for like and understand what they care about. The challenge then is to express it in a story.

His themes in his novels for older readers include family, love, belonging, body image, rites of passage, sexism, mateship/friendship, winning at all costs, relationships, identity, disability and racial issues.

== Bibliography ==
- Crossfire (UQP 2015, 2007, 1992)
- Swashbuckler (UQP 2011, 1995)
- The House on River Terrace (1995)
- Trapped (Stone Arch Books 2008, 1996)
- Buzzard Breath and Brains (UQP 1998)
- Boys and books : building a culture of reading around our boys (ABC Books 2002, 2000) (Non fiction)
- Touch Me (UQP 2007, 2000)
- Intergalactic Heroes (World Weavers Press 2002)
- Black Taxi (HarperCollins 2004)
- Lost Property (Puffin Books 2005)
- A Bridge to Wiseman's Cove (UQP 2007)
- Kill the Possum (Penguin Books 2008)
- How to Talk to a Frill Neck Lizard (Omnibus Books 2010)
- The Tower Mill (UQP 2012)
- 1844 do you dare? : the last horse race (Puffin Books 2014)
- Disappearing act (HarperCollins 2014)
- The beauty is in the walking (HarperCollins 2015)
- Bridget (Omnibus Books 2015)
- The Love That I Have (HarperCollins 2018)

=== Gracey Trilogy ===
- Dougy (UQP 2009, 1993)
- Gracey (UQP 2009, 1994)
- Angela (UQP 2009, 1998)

=== The Book of Lies series ===
- The Book of Lies (Angus & Robinson 2004)
- Master of the Books (Angus & Robinson 2005)
- The Book from Baden Dark (HarperCollins 2009)

=== The Doomsday Rats series ===
- The Tunnels of Ferdinand (HarperCollins 2004)
- The Scorpion's Tail (HarperCollins 2005)
- Malig Tumora (HarperCollins 2005)
- In the Lair of the Mountain Beast (HarperCollins 2005)
- Doomsday (HarperCollins 2006)

=== Aussie Bites and Nibbles ===
- David, The Best Model Maker in the World (Puffin Books 2000)
- Blue Hair Day (Puffin Books 2000)
- Moving House (Puffin Books 2001)
- Duck Sounds (Puffin Books 2004)
- A Box of Chicks (Penguin Books 2004)

=== Aussie Chomps ===
- Grommet Saves the World (Puffin Books 2003)
- 68 Teeth (Puffin Books 2005)
- The Trolley Boys (Penguin Group 2007)
- The Mobile Phone Detective (Penguin Books 2010)
- Driving the Fishy Frog (Puffin Books 2012)

=== Silvermay Trilogy ===
- Silvermay (Angus & Robinson 2011)
- Tamlyn (HarperCollins 2012)
- Lucien (HarperCollins 2013)

== Awards ==
Children's Book Council of Australia Awards

- 1993 Notable - Older Readers : Crossfire
- 1994 Honour Book - Older Readers : Dougy
- 1995 Honour Book - Older Readers : Gracey
- 1996 Book of the Year - Younger Readers : Swashbuckler
- 1996 Shortlisted for Book of the Year - Older Readers : The House on River Terrace
- 1997 Book of the Year - Older Readers : A bridge to Wiseman's Cove
- 1999 Shortlisted for Book of the Year - Younger Readers : Buzzard Breath and Brains
- 2001 Shortlisted for Book of the Year - Older Readers : Touch me
- 2004 Shortlisted for Book of the Year - Older Readers : Black Taxi
- 2006 Honour Book - Older Readers : Lost property
- 2009 Shortlisted for Book of the Year - Older Readers : Kill the possum
- 2016 Notable - Older Readers : The beauty is in the walking
- 2018 Winner - Dame Annabelle Rankin Award
- 2019 Nan Chauncy Award

Winner Children's Peace Literature Award 1997 : A bridge to Wiseman's Cove

Recommended Book Children's Peace Literature Award 1999 : Buzzard Breath and Brains

Honourable Mention - UNESCO Prize for Children's Literature in the Service of Tolerance and Peace : Angela (published 2009, 1993)

Winner Victorian Premiers Award 2001 Young adult category : Touch me

Winner Children's Peace Literature Award 2001 : Touch me

Shortlisted Children's Peace Literature Award 2007 : Lost Property

Winner Gold Inky 2011 : Silvermay

Shortlisted Best Designed Children's Fiction Book 2015 : Disappearing Act
