= Gracey (novel) =

1994 novel written by James Moloney

- Author: James Moloney
- Language: English
- Series: The Gracey Trilogy
- Genre: Young adult novel
- Publisher: University of Queensland Press
- Publication place: Australia
- Media type: Print
- Pages: 164 pp.
- ISBN: 0702226106
- Preceded by: Dougy
- Followed by: Angela

Gracey is a young adult novel written by Australian author James Moloney and first published in 1994 by University of Queensland Press.

By 2013 the National Library of Australia listed 24 editions of the novel in a variety of formats including book, audio book, braille and e-book. It is the second book in the Gracey trilogy, the first being Dougy (1993) and the third Angela (1998). In 1995 it was an Honour Book in the category of Older Readers in the Children's Book of the Year Awards. It is also part of the Kerry White collection of Australian children's books.

James Moloney wrote about his reasons for writing Gracey:

After Dougy, I didn't intend to keep the story going.... For young black kids in their late teens and early twenties, there were few opportunities - for jobs, for esteem in the community, for access to the things that most young men want such as a car, a bit of money in the pocket, a bit of excitement. This leads into a cycle of helplessness and then hopelessness, often getting them into trouble with the law for mainly petty offences.

I thought Raymond might go the same way ... Gracey had gone off to a boarding school and started to wonder whether she would lose her identity. The idea for the bones ...makes an interesting concept - that a modern Australian town is built over the bones of those killed so that it could be built.

== Plot summary ==
Gracey and her friend Angela are spending their last holidays in Cunningham with her brothers Dougy and Raymond. They attend school in Australia and are visiting where Gracey's family have moved. Gracey is uncomfortable and embarrassed by her family while Angela is enjoying the visit.

While playing in some trenches Dougy comes across some bones which appear to him to be human like. At Gracey's suggestion he, Gracey and Angela take them to the police where the bones are taken away from him. The police investigate and discover more bones.

Back in Brisbane, Gracey's English teacher gives Gracey a few books on aboriginal history and deaths. Gracey is at first disinterested as she wants to fit in and be a part of the 'white community', but further research reveals the origin of the bones Dougy found. Gracey returns to Cunningham when her mother dies and a series of violent and tragic incidents cause Gracey to reassess her outlook. The story is narrated by Gracey and Dougy.

== Themes ==
- Interpersonal relationships : Gracey prefers her white friend Angela and is embarrassed by her black family and their seeming hopelessness. She lacks a closeness with her brothers Dougy and Raymond, her mother and their community
- Identity : Gracey feels more at home with her white friends and the community in Brisbane. She doesn't want to be black living in Cunningham although events bring about a change in her attitudes
- Racial issues : the issues facing an Aboriginal person and their struggles in a white dominated community race

== The Gracey Trilogy ==
The Gracey Trilogy includes:

- Dougy (Book 1)
- Gracey (Book 2)
- Angela (Book 3)
