= Beeper =

A beeper is a device that makes a beep sound.

Beeper may also refer to:

== Devices ==
- Avalanche transceiver
- Buzzer
- Pager
- PC speaker, an internal loudspeaker integrated into most IBM PC compatible computers
- Piezoelectric speaker, used in early microcomputers

== Music ==
- "Beeper" (song), the debut single by The Count and Sinden
- The Beepers, an American band
- "Beepers", a song by American rapper Sir Mix-a-Lot from the 1989 album Seminar

== Other uses ==
- Beeper (application), an instant messaging application and service
- Beeper (film), a 2002 film

== See also ==
- Beep (disambiguation)
