= University of Canberra Library =

Principal library of the University of Canberra

Coordinates: 35.238068°S 149.08336°E

The University of Canberra Library is the principal Library of the University of Canberra, located in Bruce, Australian Capital Territory. The Library is located in Building 8, University main campus.

== History ==
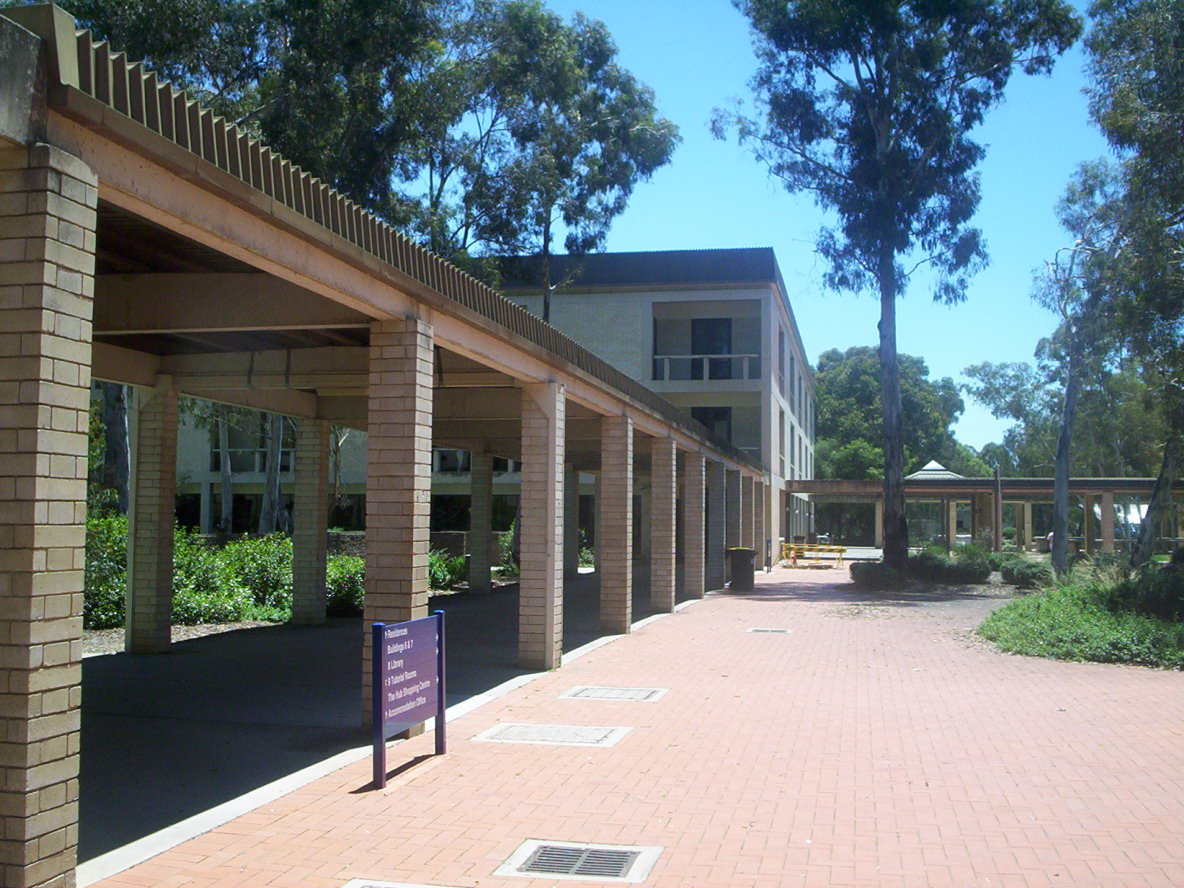
The University of Canberra Library in 2003

The Library was established by foundation Librarian Victor Crittenden before the official opening of the Canberra College of Advanced Education (CCAE), now the University of Canberra. The Library was located in the old Canberra High School building from 1969. The collection was initially transferred to Building 1 on the CCAE campus in 1970 while Building 8 was planned and constructed, then moved to its current location in 1972. The 100,000th volume was added to the collection in 1974.

== Collections ==
The Library has extensive print and electronic collections across the full range of disciplines supported by the University of Canberra. Material is organised using Library of Congress Classification and Moys Legal Classification.

=== Special collections ===
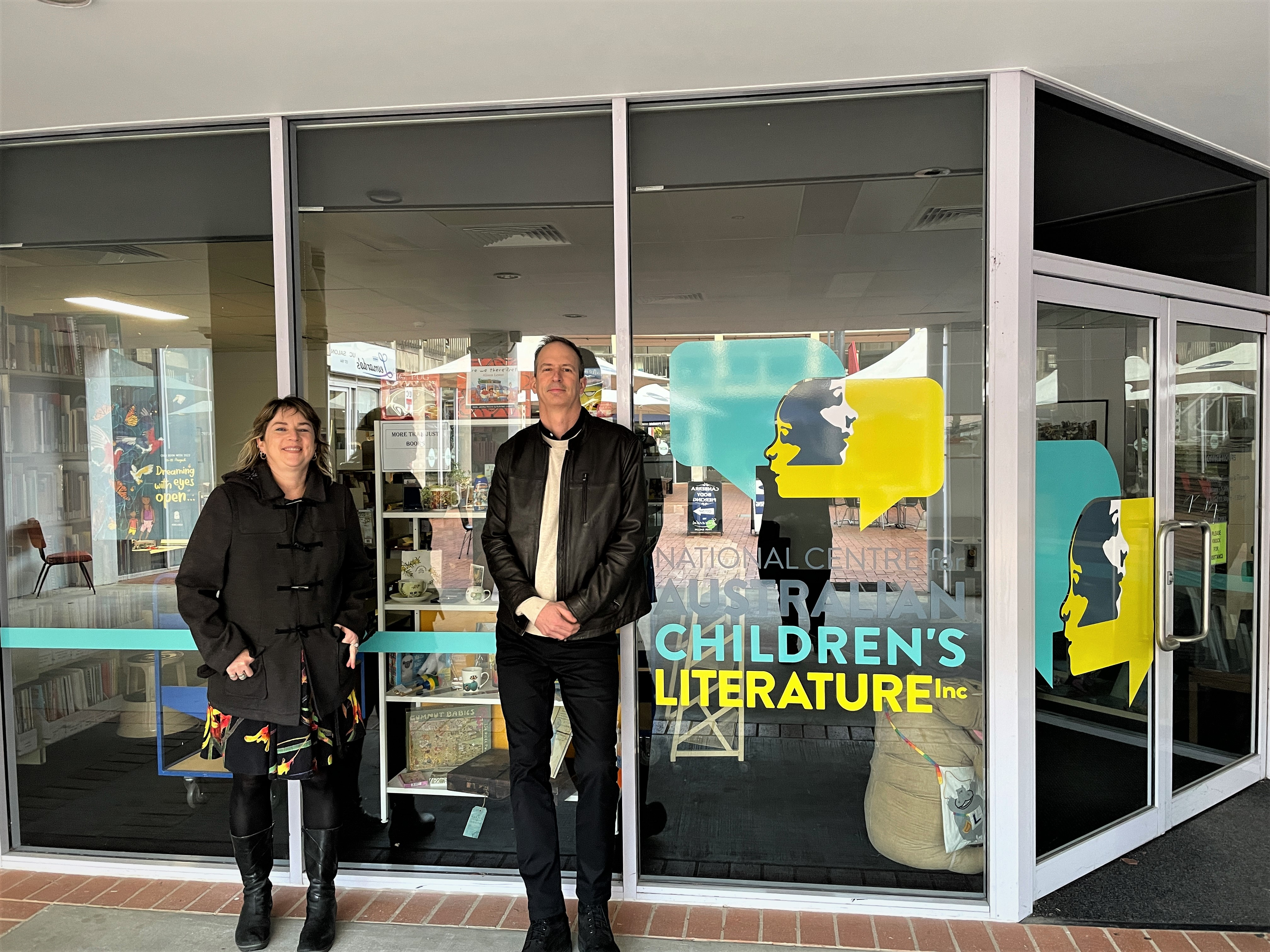
National Centre for Australian Children's Literature

The Library houses a number of special collections, these include:

- University Deposit Collection: closed archive containing preservation copies of documents published by the University
- Theses Collection: PhD, Masters, and some Honours theses produced by UC students;
- National Centre for Australian Children's Literature: a research centre formerly owned by the Children's Book Council of Australia which houses a collection of resources encouraging the study and research of Australian children's literature
- Clough Collection: materials purchased from landscape architect Dr Richard Clough in 1974
- Rare Books Collection: comprises rare or fragile books with an imprint pre-1900, plus some special or limited editions

=== Research repository ===
The University of Canberra Research Repository "preserves and provides access to the research outputs of the University to local, national and international communities".

Content includes:

- Details of books, chapters, journal articles, conference papers, and theses completed by UC researchers;
- Where possible, links to open access documents; and
- The full text of recent theses completed at UC, and abstracts for older theses.
