= The Book from Baden Dark =

Novel by James Moloney

The Book From Baden Dark is the third book in The Book of Lies series written by James Moloney.

== Author ==
James Moloney is one of Australia's most respected and awarded children's authors. He has won the Children's Book Council of Australia Book of the Year Award twice - for Swashbuckler in 1996 and for A Bridge to Wiseman's Cove in 1997. His comic novel Black Taxi was shortlisted for the CBCA Award for Older Readers in 2004, and The Book of Lies was a Notable Book in 2005 and was also featured in the 2006 Books Alive campaign.
