= Angela (novel) =

Young adult novel by James Moloney

- First edition cover
- Author: James Moloney
- Publisher: University of Queensland Press
- Publication date: 1 January 1998
- ISBN: 978-0-702-23084-4

Angela is a young adult novel written by Australian author James Moloney, first published in 1998 by University of Queensland Press. By 2013 the National Library of Australia listed 19 editions of the novel in a variety of formats including book, audio book, braille and e-book. It is the third book in the Gracey trilogy, the first being Dougy (1993) and the second Gracey (1994) It won an Honourable Mention in the UNESCO Prize for Children's Literature in the Service of Tolerance and Peace. It is also part of Kerry White collection of Australian children's books.

== Background ==
James Moloney wrote the following about Angela:

Angela was written six years after "Gracey". Again, I never intended to keep the story going. However, when the report about the "stolen" generation was published, I took a special interest ... I obtained a copy of the report "Bringing Them Home" and read it. This led me to read another report titled, "For the Benefit of the Child," ... some cases, children were taken away by force. In others, they were reluctantly surrendered by their parents who had no legal rights and no idea of what the government was really trying to do. Either way, the children were stolen. When I realised this, I wanted to write about it. It would have to be a story through a write [white] person's eyes this time because I had reached an end to my observations of aboriginal life. I chose Angela, Gracey's friend from the earlier book as my heroine.

== Plot summary ==
The friends Angela and Gracey are now in the first year of university and their once close relationship is strained by the new environment and new friendships. Gracey a Murri is trying to immerse herself in the indigenous culture on campus and while Angela tries to be encouraging their former close relationship is gradually disintegrating. The Stolen Generation stories cause Gracey to struggle with decisions made by whites in the past. Through a painful journey Gracey is able to accept and move towards reconciliation of black and white Australia. Angela is the narrator of the novel.

== Themes ==
- Interpersonal relationships : Angela and Gracey relationship changes as they find new friendships. Angela struggles with Graceys embracing of her aboriginality and her anger
- Identity : Gracey accepts being a Murri and Angela discovers events in her past which cause her to rethink her own history. The bond between the two girls is strengthened
- Racial issues : Stolen Generation, inequality between black and white, reconciliation
