= List of CBCA Awards =

The Children's Book Council of Australia Awards was started by the Children's Book Council of Australia (CBCA) in 1946 with one category. The awards have grown and now there are five categories in the Book of the Year Awards and numerous other awards presented annually by the National Office and CBCA branches in each State and Territory.

The winner of the inaugural award received a flower, "a camellia". In more recent times the awards have been funded through Government grants (1966–1988), and lately by individual and corporation donations and sponsorships. The CBCA decided in 1995 to establish an Award Foundation to secure the funding for these awards for the future.

== Children’s Book Council of Australia Book of the Year Awards ==
Five award categories are selected annually. They are:

- CBCA Book of the Year: Older Readers — for readers in their secondary years of schooling
- CBCA Book of the Year: Younger Readers — for readers from the middle to upper primary years
- CBCA Book of the Year: Early Childhood — for children who are at pre-reading or early stages of reading
- CBCA Book of the Year: Picture Book — for outstanding books of the Picture Book genre
- Children's Book of the Year Award: New Illustrator – for new talent in the field of Australian children's book illustration
- Eve Pownall Award for Information Books — for books that document factual material

== Other CBCA Awards ==
- Dame Annabelle Rankin Award – presented for distinguished services to children’s literature in Queensland.
- Nan Chauncy Award – a national biennial award presented to recognise a person’s outstanding contribution to the field of children’s literature in Australia.
- Crichton Award for Children's Book Illustration (1988–2018), now the Children's Book of the Year Award: New Illustrator
- Leila St John Award – for services to children’s literature in Victoria.
- Lady Cutler Award – presented for distinguished services to children's literature in NSW.

== Australian Children's Choice Awards ==
The CBCA Book of the Year awards are a literary award. Recognising that children themselves may have differing opinions on the books, the CBCA support several awards which seek to poll the views of children themselves.

- Books I Love Best Yearly (BILBY Awards) — CBCA Queensland Branch.
- Canberra’s Own Outstanding List (COOL Awards) — Libraries ACT have been convening the COOL Awards since 1991.
- Kanga (previously CROW Awards) — The CROW Award (Children Reading Outstanding Writers) was a South Australian popular choice award. After 1998 it went into recess, in 2003 it was briefly resurrected as the Kanga Awards by a consortium of bookshops, government and enthusiast bodies.
- Kids Own Australian Literature Awards (KOALA) — The KOALA Awards for NSW children are managed by a volunteer committee.
- Kids' Reading Oz Choice (KROC Awards) — Managed by the City of Darwin Libraries.
- West Australian Young Readers' Book Awards (WAYRBA) — Was started by members of the CBCA Western Australia Branch, but is now run by a separate committee.
- Young Australian Best Book Awards (YABBA) — The YABBA Awards is operated and managed by a volunteer committee.

== Young Reviewer of the Year Awards ==
- Queensland Young Reviewer of the Year Award
- Victoria Young Reviewer of the Year Award
- Western Australia Young Reviewer of the Year Award

== See also ==
- Children's Book Council of Australia
- List of Australian literary awards
- List of literary awards
