= Bips =

Bips or BIPS may refer to:

- Basis point, colloquially referred to in plural as bips
- Bipasha Basu (born 1979), an Indian actress whose nickname is Bips

== See also ==
- BIP (disambiguation)
