= The Book of Lies (Moloney novel) =

Novel by James Moloney

- Australian novel cover
- Author: James Moloney
- Cover artist: James Moloney
- Language: English
- Genre: Fantasy
- Published: 26 May 2004 HarperCollins
- Publication place: Australia
- Media type: Print (Paperback)
- Pages: 392
- ISBN: 978-0-207-19831-1
- Followed by: Master of the Books

The Book of Lies is the debut fantasy novel by Australian novelist James Moloney, published in 2004 by HarperCollins.

The novel is the first in a fantasy series, also titled The Book of Lies. Book two, titled Master of the Books, was released on 1 June 2007 and a third and final novel concluding the series was released on 1 June 2009, called The Book from Baden Dark.

== Plot ==
A 12-year-old boy wakes up in an orphanage one morning with no memory of who he is. The only thing he remembers clearly his name, Robert and his mother is dead. Other memory are vague and hard to grasp.

But Robert is not his name. He meets Bea, who tells of his name. His real name is Marcel. She was there when Lord Alwyn, a mysterious figure, erased all of his memory using the powerful Book of Lies.

He encounters the mighty Fergus and the haughty Nicola during his stay at the orphanage, both of whose memories are nothing more than lies.

One day a mysterious man called Starkey claims to know the real lives of Nicola, Fergus and Marcel.

Upon meeting his mother, imprisoned by the evil usurper King Pelham, he suddenly is not sure. Is Starkey all that he claims to be? Is his mother his real mother? Is King Pelham really evil, or was that a lie as well? Danger lurks at every corner, and Marcel must stop the most feared Mortregis, beast of war, from rising once again.

== Awards ==
The Book of Lies was listed as notable in the Younger Readers category of the 2005 Children's Book Council of Australia Awards, and was the winner in its category at the 2005 APA Book Design Awards.
