= Children's Book Council of Australia =

Australian not-for-profit organization

- Type: Non-profit organization
- Industry: Children's literature
- Founded: 1945
- Revenue: 494,000 Australian dollar (2023)
- Total assets: 612,228 Australian dollar (2023)
- Number of employees: 2 (2023, 2022, 2021, 2020)
- Website: cbca.org.au

The Children's Book Council of Australia (CBCA) is a not-for-profit organisation which aims to engage the community with literature for young Australians. The CBCA presents the annual Children's Book of the Year Awards to books of literary merit, recognising their contribution to Australian children's literature.

== History ==
After World War II the US Children's Book Council, which had been sponsoring an annual Children's Book Week in the United States, decided to initiate an International Children's Book Week, with the theme "United through Books". In September 1945, the US Information Library in Sydney, on the initiative of Mary Townes Nyland, discussed the idea with a group of people representing the Australian Broadcasting Commission, the New South Wales Department of Education, schools, children's libraries, and publishers, who received it with enthusiastism.

The inaugural national International Children's Book Week was celebrated across Australia, with the theme of "United Through Books", in November 1945. The Children's Book Council of New South Wales was established in 1945, and similar organisations followed in South Australia and Tasmania in 1946, in Western Australia in 1947. Each state Council organised an annual exhibition for Children's Book Week, at first using posters produced by the American Children's Book Council.

In 1959, the various state councils amalgamated to form the Children's Book Council of Australia, with the National Council rotated through the states.

== Description and governance ==
The Children's Book Council of Australia (CBCA) is a not-for-profit organisation which aims to engage the community with literature for young Australians.

The CBCA is a national organisation with branches in every state and territory of Australia. Some branches also have sub-branches. Branches are mostly autonomous, but generally adhere to guidelines set by the National Board. The National Board was established in 2012 and represents every branch of the CBCA. The Board is responsible for the annual Book of the Year Awards, plus the presentation of the prizes as well as Children's Book Week and the annual range of merchandise, as well as the online reviewing journal Reading Time and the biennial National Conferences.

== Awards ==
The inaugural Australian Children's Book of the Year Award was presented in 1946, to The Story of Karrawingi the Emu, by Leslie Rees. Until 1952, there was a single award category (now the CBCA Book of the Year: Older Readers Award).

In 1952 a category for the Picture Books was created, followed by a Younger Readers category in 1982; the Eve Pownall Award for Non-Fiction in 1993; and the Early Childhood Award category in 2001, bringing the total number of categories to five.

In 2019 the New Illustrator Award, formerly the Crichton Award for Children's Book Illustration, was added. In 2022 Shadow Judging was added to each category with panels of children selecting their preferred winners.

=== Funding ===
Initially the awards were funded through Government grants (1966–1988), and later by individual and corporation donations and sponsorships. A major five-year partnership with the Myer Group provided $50,000.00 per year. When this ceased the CBCA decided to establish the CBCA Awards Foundation. This was set up in 1996 and raised over one million dollars. Proceeds from investments now fund prizes for the awards in perpetuity. Benefactors (donations $20,000.00 and over) and Major Donors ($5000.00 and over) are permanently acknowledged on all printed and electronic matter emanating from the CBCA.

== Other CBCA Awards ==
- Dame Annabelle Rankin Award – presented for distinguished services to children's literature in Queensland.
- Nan Chauncy Award – a national biennial award presented to recognise a person's outstanding contribution to the field of children's literature in Australia.
- Crichton Award for Children's Book Illustration – an award to recognise new talent in the field of Australian children's book illustration (1988–2018).
- Leila St John Award – for services to children's literature in Victoria.
- Lady Cutler Award – presented for distinguished services to children's literature in NSW.

== The National Centre for Australian Children's Literature ==
The National Centre for Australian Children's Literature (previously known as the Lu Rees Archives) is a comprehensive collection of books and other resources about authors, illustrators, publishers and their creative works. Lu Rees, the founding president of the ACT Branch of the Children's Book Council of Australia, proposed in 1974 that there should be a collection of research files about Australian children's authors and illustrators together with a collection of their books. In 1980 this collection was deposited at the University of Canberra Library so it could be publicly available. The collection was largely developed with donations from CBCA members. In 1979, in response to the International Year of the Child, Rees initiated a plan to collect overseas translated editions of Australian authors.

Since 1984, the Centre has stored, conserved, and managed, on behalf of the CBCA, the original artwork created by various artists for the annual celebration of Children's Book Week.

== See also ==
- List of CBCA Awards
- List of Australian literary awards

== Bibliography ==
1. Alderman, B (2006). "The Children's Book Council of Australia Awards 1977–1992". Reading Time. 50 (3): 16–19.
2. Buckley, Trish; Kirkland, Marj (September 2010). "The Children's Book Council of Australia". Access. ProQuest 751284821.
3. Hamilton, Margaret (2005). "Thanks a Million!". Reading Time. 49 (4): 9.
4. Hateley, Erica (2013). "Paranoid Prizing : Mapping Australia's Eve Pownall Award for Information Books, 2001–2010". Bookbird: A Journal of International Children's Literature. 51 (1): 41–50. doi:10.1353/bkb.2013.0008. S2CID 143926047. Project MUSE 496257 ProQuest 1445353282.
5. Macleod, Mark (21 April 2011). "The Children's Book Council of Australia and the Judging of Literary Excellence". New Review of Children's Literature and Librarianship. 17 (1): 20–35. doi:10.1080/13614541.2011.562792. S2CID 143611192.
6. MacLeod, Mark (March 2011). "The Children's Book Council of Australia Book of the Year and the Image Problem". Access. ProQuest 861637419.
7. Richards, Diana (October 2013). "Lu Rees archives: A world class treasury of Australian children's literature". Incite. 34 (10): 26–27.
8. Saxby, HM (2006). "C B C A Awards 1961–1976". Reading Time. 50 (2): 6–9.
9. Saxby, Maurice (2005). "CBC Sixty Years On". Reading Time. 49 (4): 6–9.
10. Wells, J (2013). "CBCA and the new National Board". Reading Time. 57 (2): 2–5.
