= Beep, beep =

Beep, beep may refer to:

- Beep, beep (sound), an onomatopoeia representing a noise
- Beep, Beep (film), a 1952 cartoon starring Wile E. Coyote and the Road Runner

== Music ==
- Beep Beep (band), an American rock band
- Beep Beep (EP), by BTOB, 2014
- Beep Beep, an EP by Jessica Jung, 2023
- "Beep Beep" (song), by the Playmates, 1958
- "Beep! Beep!", a song by 13 Stories, 2006
- "Beep Beep", a song by Girls' Generation, a B-side of the single "Flower Power", 2012
- "Beep Beep", a song by Little Mix from Glory Days, 2016
- "Beep Beep", a song by Nicki Minaj from Pink Friday 2
- "Beep Beep", a song by Ruann, 2019

== See also ==
- Beep (disambiguation)
