= Denis Kevans =

Australian singer and poet

Peter Denis Kevans (15 January 1939–2005) was an Australian poet, songwriter and folk singer born in Canberra, who lived in Sydney and the Blue Mountains. Known as Australia's "poet lorikeet", he wrote mainly on political, human rights and environmental topics. He also worked for 20 years as a journalist and teacher.

== Life ==
Kevans was born in Westlake, Canberra in 1939. His mother, Mona Knight, was the daughter of Alfred Knight of No. 1 Westlake, which is today the site of a memorial to the families who lived in the area, located close to the grounds of the Mexican Embassy in Yarralumla. The sites of the majority of Westlake Cottages (1924-1965) are in the grounds of the nearby Stirling Park in Yarralumla. Kevans attended St Christopher's Convent School in Manuka. His younger brother, Anthony John "Jacko" Kevans (1942–2005) was a bush musician and a teacher; the brothers performed together and Anthony Kevans was also a member of Monaro Boys and of the Larrikins.

Kevans won a scholarship to St Josephs College, Sydney, where he played cricket and rugby for the school first teams of 1956. Upon leaving St. Joseph's College he continued playing cricket, being selected by Robert Menzies for the Prime Minister's XI, which played the touring English team in 1958. Although initially studying medicine, at his father's urging for him to become a writer he switched courses to complete a Bachelor of Arts and Diploma of Education and a Master of Arts in Australian Literature at Sydney University, while working on building sites and becoming a member of the New South Wales Builders Labourers Federation.

Kevans became active in pro-peace political and cultural movements, including the Realist Writers Group associated with the Bush Music Club. He wrote humorous poems and original songs on political topics, and published several books and two CDs. He received a number of poetry awards during his lifetime. Kevans died in 2005 of complications following heart surgery. He is survived by his daughter, Sophia Kevans, and granddaughter Anastasia.

== Recognition ==
A bushland reserve located on the corner of Armstrong Street and Valley Road in Wentworth Falls, New South Wales, was posthumously dedicated to his memory, as the "Denis Kevans Bushland Gardens". One of the sandstone plinths at famous Echo Point in Katoomba has his poem “Passing Mist” carved into it and bears his name.

Several concerts in honour of Kevans have been held since his passing, including one held on 24 April 2009. The Blue Mountains Music Festival holds an annual Denis Kevans Poetry event in his honour.
