= BEF =

BEF may refer to:

== Arts and media ==
- BEF (image format), used by HDR PhotoStudio
- Bibliothèque des Ecoles françaises d'Athènes et de Rome, mediaeval history books (1877–1960)
- British Electric Foundation, a band (1981–2013)

== Military ==
- Brazilian Expeditionary Force, 1942–1945
- British Expeditionary Force (World War I), 1914–1918
- British Expeditionary Force (World War II), 1939–1940

== Transport ==
- Benfleet railway station, Essex, England (BEF)
- Bluefields Airport, Nicaragua (IATA:BEF)

== Other uses ==
- Belgian franc, a defunct currency (ISO 4217:BEF)
- Binary entropy function, in information theory
- Bonus Expeditionary Force, an American veterans' protest
- Bovine ephemeral fever
- British Equestrian Federation, in horse racing
- Black Eye Friday, British pre-Christmas revelry
