= Bismuth phosphide =

Names
- Other names Phosphanylidynebismuth

Identifiers
CAS Number	12330-83-5
3D model (JSmol)	Interactive image
PubChem CID	22234758
- InChI: InChI=1S/Bi.P/q+3;-3 Key: UKKKTITYQGAFLZ-UHFFFAOYSA-N
- SMILES: [P-3].[Bi+3]

Properties
Chemical formula	BiP
Molar mass	239.9
Appearance	Black solid
Density	g/cm^{3}
- Except where otherwise noted, data are given for materials in their standard state (at 25 °C [77 °F], 100 kPa). Infobox references

Bismuth phosphide is a proposed inorganic compound with the chemical formula BiP. The structure of this material is unknown.

== Synthesis ==
One route entails the reaction of sodium phosphide and bismuth trichloride in toluene (0 °C):

Na_{3}P + BiCl_{3} → BiP + 3 NaCl

Another method uses tris(trimethylsilyl)phosphine in place of the sodium phosphide.

== Physical properties ==
When heated in air, bismuth phosphide burns.

When heated in an atmosphere of carbon dioxide, a gradual volatilization of phosphorus is observed.

== Chemical properties ==
This compound is oxidized when boiled in water.

All strong acids dissolve it.
