= Bip Apollo =

American graffiti artist

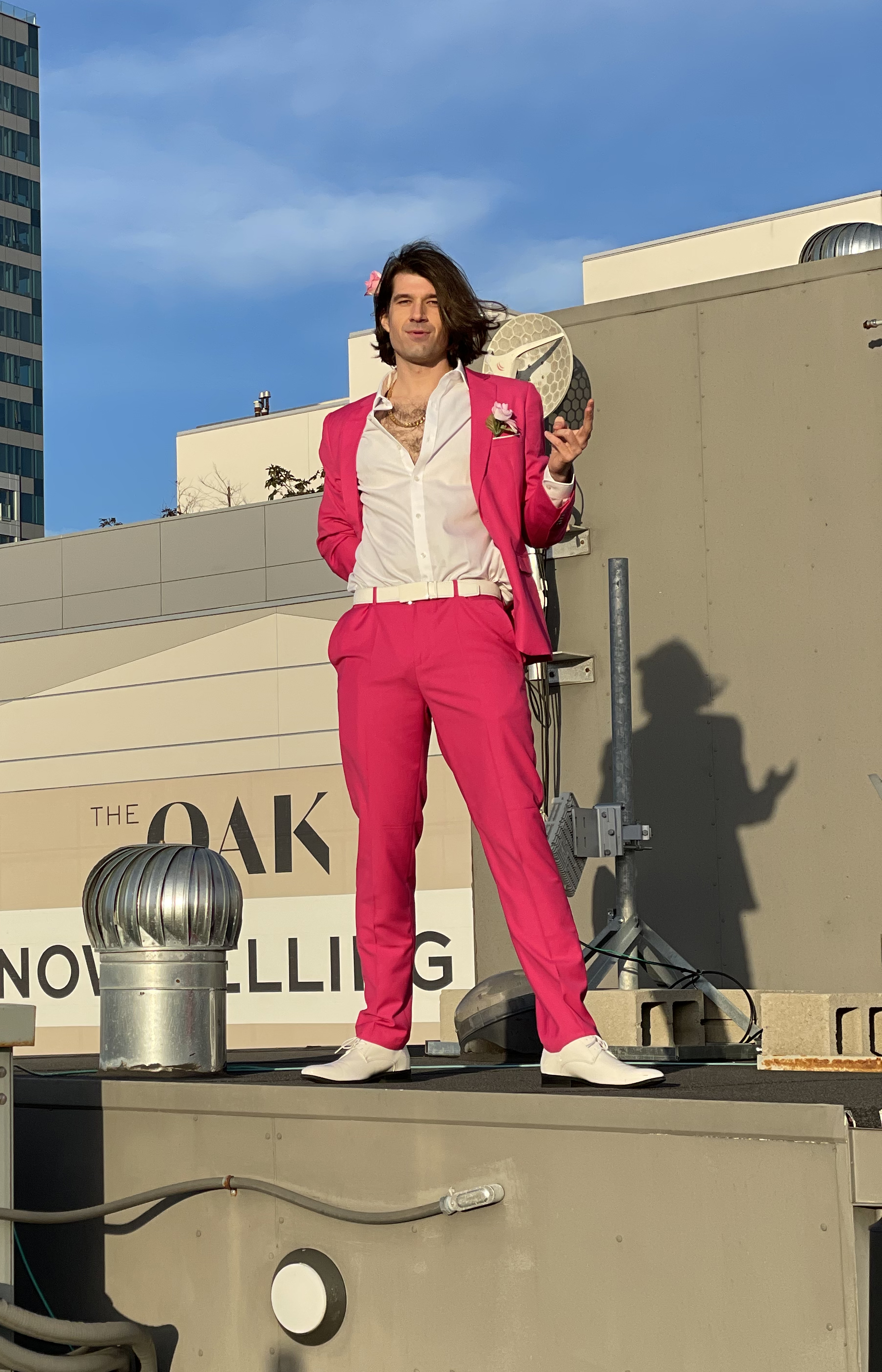
- Bip Apollo on a rooftop in San Francisco 2022
- Known for: Luxury sculpture and urban art
- Website: www.BipApollo.com

Bip Apollo (also known online as "Bip Graffiti", "BiP", and "Believe in People") is a formerly anonymous painter and sculptor who is "known internationally for his role in spear-heading the North American street art revival" and creating in-demand luxury art. He initially came to public attention in 2010 around New Haven, Connecticut, moved to the San Francisco around 2013, and began extensively traveling internationally in 2015. Bip Apollo's studio is currently based between Monte Carlo, Monaco and San Francisco.

== Practice ==
Bip Apollo produces work internationally in both the luxury art market and urban art scene as a painter and sculptor. Likewise, Bip has claimed publicly that his work is not committed to graffiti for graffiti's sake but rather, dedicated to a spirit of resistance to skepticism and estrangement, so as to positively change the way people interact with their environment.

"My main motivation is that I want to change the way people interact with their environment in a positive way. Seeing even a slight smile in an onlooker is deeply satisfying. Knowing that you were able to communicate a thought or feeling … It’s worth it .”

Bip's private artwork sells to celebrities and high end collectors, which he uses to fund non-profit public art.

== East Coast Period ==
In 2011, Bip allowed Kimberly Chow, a 2009 Yale University alumnus and former Yale Daily News reporter, to interview him and witness him in action painting a piece that visualizes the origins to his creative work. According to Chow, the name, "Bip", as an abbreviation of "believe in people", is a manifesto in response to a theme the artist discovered repeated throughout his deceased childhood friend's journals.

Bip's spray-paint and stencil murals began popping up during nighttime hours around New Haven beginning in October 2010. Early in his career, Bip illegally painted buildings and spaces around Yale University in New Haven. One of his highest-profile paintings in New Haven is a large smiling portrait of Anne Frank located outside of Partner's Cafe, a bar on Crown Street, a nightlife district.

During this time, reactions to Bip's work were polarizing. While his illegal work was celebrated by some city residents and journalists, some city officials condemned his works as acts of vandalism. Abigail Rider, real estate manager for Yale University said:

Our position on graffiti is that no matter how beautiful it may be (and most of it is far from beautiful) it is an act of vandalism which if not promptly removed sends a signal to people in the area that the owners and residents of the area think it’s not worth it to maintain their property.

— Abigail Rider, real estate manager for Yale University

After he was invited to produce a mural at a lumberyard, NBC Connecticut speculated about his identity and intentions.

== West Coast Period ==
In what is confirmed from news articles to be 2013 or 2014, Bip relocated to a permanent residence in San Francisco, California. After re-location, Bip began to paint gigantic murals. In 2015, Bip completed a 7-story mural in the Tenderloin district of San Francisco, depicting a man examining his own heart under a microscope.

The following year, Bip created a 5-story mural in downtown Oakland, California, of an elderly Oakland resident listening to a heavy metal album.

Bip followed this growth with a string of large buildings throughout the Bay Area and by 2018 had become synonymous with the West Coast street art revival.

Bip's most well known mural is a 2017 5-story building for the San Francisco Westfield Centre, known as "No Ceiling", depicting a young African-American resident with artificially large muscles. In 2018 Bip announced plans to continue with up to ten additional buildings in San Francisco.

== International Touring Period ==
In 2015 Bip began to travel aggressively for international museums and public art festivals while maintaining total anonymity. Beginning with an eight-story mural for the Museum of Krasnoyarsk, Russia, Bip followed with a tour of South America sponsored by Montana Colors Spraypaint as well as a four-story mural for the Museum of Contemporary Art in Taipei, Taiwan.

Throughout this time, Bip continued to wear a mask that has become a part of his public persona.

In a 2017 interview with reporter Jonathan Curiel of San Francisco Weekly, Bip reflected on the changes brought on by international success as a young artist.

To date, the artist has created installations in over 25 countries which he publishes on his website.

== Monaco/South of France Period ==
In 2023, Bip Apollo relocated his studio to Monte Carlo, Monaco where he has created large scale sculpture work and participated in local events such as The Monaco Yacht Show.
