= Bulletin of Public Information =

- BIP current logo
- Headquarters: ul. Królewska 27, 00-060 Warszawa
- Key people: Tadeusz Mąkosa, Editor-in-chief
- Website: https://www.gov.pl/web/bip

The Bulletin of Public Information (Polish: Biuletyn Informacji Publicznej, stylised as bip) is a Polish system of unified public records online, consisting of an array of standardized pages created with the general public in mind. For those interested in the operation of any particular institution in Poland or in finding a way of contacting them in order to settle a particular matter, the BIP given entry is often the optimal source of data and background information. The offices of BIP are located at Królewska 27 Street in Warsaw. Its Editor-in-chief is Tadeusz Mąkosa.

== Legislation ==
Data made available by BIP is regulated by the Polish Law on Access to Public Information passed on 6 September 2001, based on Article 61 of the Constitution of Poland which provides for the right to information and mandates that Parliament enact a law setting out this right. The Law went into effect in January 2002.

The Biuletyn Informacji Publicznej BIP gives access to public information, public data and public assets held by public bodies, private bodies that exercise public tasks, trade unions and political parties. The requests regarding specific items can be made either orally in person or by writing. The bodies must respond within 14 days. The regulation of the Minister of Internal Affairs and Administration regarding the Public Information Bulletin BIP was passed on 18 January 2007, replacing Regulation of 17 May 2002. The minimum requirements for submitting public records to BIP in electronic form were established by Council of Ministers of the National Interoperability on 12 April 2012.

== See also ==
- Freedom of information laws by country
