= Diann Blakely =

American poet

Diann Blakely (June 1, 1957 – August 5, 2014) was an American poet, essayist, editor, and critic. She taught at Belmont University, Harvard University, Vanderbilt University, led workshops at two Vermont College residencies, and served as senior instructor and the first poet-in-residence at the Harpeth Hall School in Nashville, Tennessee. A "Robert Frost Fellow" at Bread Loaf, she was a Dakin Williams Fellow at the Sewanee Writers' Conference at which she had worked earlier as founding coordinator.

== Life and work ==
Born Harriet Diann Blakely in Anniston, Alabama on June 1, 1957, Blakely graduated with a Bachelor of Arts in art history from the University of the South in 1979, she subsequently received a Master of Arts in literature from Vanderbilt University in 1980 and a Master of Fine Arts from Vermont College in 1989. Her first volume of poetry, Hurricane Walk, was published under the name Diann Blakely Shoaf in 1992. Subsequently, the St. Louis Post Dispatch named it as one of the ten best verse collections published that year. Her second book, Farewell, My Lovelies, published in 2000 and influenced by "noir" shading, was listed as a Choice of the Academy of American Poets' Book Club. Her third volume, Cities of Flesh and the Dead, won Elixir Press's 7th annual publication prize after being distinguished by the Poetry Society of America's Alice Fay di Castagnola Award, given for a year's best manuscript-in-progress. Anthologized in several volumes, including Best American Poetry 2003 and Pushcart Prize Anthologies XIX and XX, Prior to her death, Blakely was working on two new manuscripts entitled Rain in Our Door: Duets with Robert Johnson and Lost Addresses: New and Selected Poems

Diann Blakely’s much anticipated Lost Addresses: New & Selected Poems was published by Salmon Poetry in February 2017.

Blakely was a former poetry editor at the Antioch Review and at New World Writing and served on Plath Profiles' board. She contributed essays, poetry, and reviews to that journal and to many other publication, including the Harvard Review, Nashville Scene, Village Voice Media, Pleiades, and Smartish Pace.

Blakely died in Brunswick, GA, on August 5, 2014 after complications from a chronic lung disorder. She was 57.

== Awards ==
- Pushcart Prize (1994, 1995)
- Poetry Society of America's Alice Fay di Castagnola Award (1999)

== Selected publications ==
- Rain in Our Door: Duets with Robert Johnson (White Pine Press, 2018)
- Lost Addresses: New & Selected Poems (Salmon Poetry, 2017)
- Cities of Flesh and the Dead (Elixir Press, 2008)
- Farewell, My Lovelies (Story Line Press, 2000)
- Hurricane Walk (BOA Editions, Ltd., 1992)

=== Poems ===
- "Walking Blues: Duet with Robert Johnson #31" at Harvard Review
- "Two Poems" at Bomb Magazine
- "The Storm," "Reunion Banquet, Class of '79," and "Chorale" at Levure Littéraire
- "Magi" and "Georgia Pilgrimage" at The Enchanting Verses Literary Review
- "Antonioni’s blow-up" at Dublin Poetry Review
- "Santa Ana," "Charlotte Brontë's Gloves," and "Another Art" at Mezzo Cammin
- "The Story of Their Lives" at New World Writing
- "92 Johnson Avenue, 1985" and "Two Poems" at Plath Profiles
- "Ten Poems" at storySouth
- "Afterwords (IM William Matthews)" at The Best American Poetry
- "Bad Blood" at Verse Daily
- "Dead Shrimp Blues" at The Chronicle of Higher Education
- "Before the Flood: A Solo From New Orleans" at Chapter 16

=== Anthologies ===
- Whatever Remembers Us: An Anthology of Alabama Poetry (Negative Capability Press, 2007)
- Best American Poets 2003 (Scribner, 2003)
- Orpheus and Company: Contemporary Poems on Greek Mythology (UPNE, 1999)
- The Movies: Texts, Receptions, Exposures (University of Michigan Press, 1997)
- Pushcart Prize Anthologies XIX and XX (Pushcart Press, 1996 and 1997)
- Lights, Camera, Poetry!: American Movie Poems, The First Hundred Years (Mariner Books, 1996)
- Homewords (University of Tennessee Press, 1986)

=== Reviews and essays ===
==== Harvard Review ====
- Intruder by Jill Bialosky

==== The Best American Poetry ====
- The New Black
- Ave Atque Vale: William Matthews by Diann Blakely

==== New World Writing ====
- She Do the Police In Different Voices
- The Zanesville Bear Cub & the Puritan Tradition

==== Nashville Scene ====
- Excitable Boys: This year's best books for music lovers

==== Plath Profiles ====
- Heptonstall Cemetery: A Memoir, A Tribute, A Defense, and A Eulogy
- Review of Heather Clark's The Grief of Influence: Sylvia Plath and Ted Hughes
- Bee-Stung in October

==== Poets.org ====
- Women of the New Gen: Refashioning Poetry

==== Smartish Pace ====
- Jonathan Galassi: Left-Handed; John FitzGerald: The Mind; David St. John: The Auroras

==== Swampland ====
- In the Sanctuary of Outcasts: A Memoir
