= BiP (software) =

Instant messaging app by Turkcell

- Other names: BiP – Messaging, Voice and Video Calling
- Developer: Lifecell Ventures Cooperatief U.A.
- Release: 2013
- Website: Official website

BiP is a freeware instant messaging application developed by Lifecell Ventures Cooperatief U.A., a subsidiary of Turkcell incorporated in the Netherlands. It allows users to send text messages, voice messages and video calling, and it can be downloaded from the App Store, Google Play, and Huawei AppGallery. BiP has over 53 million users worldwide, and was first released in 2013.

== Functions ==
BiP is a secure, and free communication platform. BiP allows making video and audio calls, allows sharing images, videos and location. BiP includes instant translations to 106 languages and exchange rates. President Erdoğan's Communications Office opposed WhatsApp's enforcement of its updated privacy policy and announced that Erdoğan left WhatsApp and opened an account in Telegram and BiP. The Turkish Ministry of National Defense has announced that it will move information groups to BiP for the same reason.

== Others ==
Banglalink announced a BiP messenger partnership in Bangladesh The Communications Office of President Erdoğan opposed WhatsApp's enforcement of its updated privacy policy and announced that Erdoğan left WhatsApp and opened an account in Telegram and BiP. The Turkish Ministry of National Defense has announced that it will move information groups to BiP for the same reason.

The CEO of BiP is Burak Akinci.

The number of downloads of the app is 80 million globally.

== See also ==
- Comparison of instant messaging clients
- Comparison of VoIP software
- List of most-downloaded Google Play applications
- Comparison of user features of messaging platforms
