= Beep (video game) =

2011 video game

- Developer: Big Fat Alien
- Platforms: Windows, Mac OS X, Linux
- Release: Windows, Mac; 3 March 2011; Linux; 12 July 2011
- Genre: Platform
- Mode: Single-player

Beep is a 2D platform game released on 3 March 2011 by Canadian studio Big Fat Alien for Windows, Mac OS X and Linux. The Linux version arrived on Gameolith on 12 July 2011 and in the Ubuntu Software Center on 22 July 2011.

== Gameplay ==
In Beep, the player controls a robot sent from Earth who must find anti-matter in order to power his ship, and continue exploring. The player begins in a spaceship and is able to navigate to different planets within the Solar System. When arriving at a level on a planet, a robot is deployed and the player must control the robot through the level. Collecting anti-matter, and anti-matter nuggets unlocks new levels and planets; there are 24 levels total. In each level, the player controls a four-wheeled robot, attacking enemy robots with your gun, and using an anti-gravity beam to move objects and platforms in order to access different parts of the level. Some objects can even be used to destroy hostile robots. In some instances, players must stack dead enemies' bodies in order to advance. Environments include swamp, ice, desert, and caves. The game is heavily physics-based and allows the robot to jump, glide, swim, and cling to surfaces.

== Reception ==
Beep has received mixed praise and criticism from a couple of reviewers. Eurogamer's Matteo Lorenzetti praised the game's physics, comparing the robot's anti-gravity beam to Half-Life 2's gravity gun. While he also lauded the game's overall enjoyment factor, he criticized its lack of customization, saying that players are forced to use a mouse and WASD keys. PC Gamer's Rachel Weber noted that the controls were very sensitive. She also bemoaned the game's bland graphics, noting the "distinct lack of eye candy" and "that final slick of lipstick and blusher". Gamezebo's Alicia Ashby criticized the game's physics as "mushy and imprecise", adding that players would be fighting against the controls instead of enjoying the game.
