= BEEPS =

The Business Environment and Enterprise Performance Survey (BEEPS) is an extensive economic survey undertaken as a joint initiative of the World Bank and the European Bank for Reconstruction and Development.

The BEEPS surveys are conducted in the countries of Eastern Europe and Central Asia and gather information about key indicators on topics important for business environment such as problems doing Business, informal payments and corruption, Finance, Labor, Crime, Infrastructure, innovation, legal and judicial issues, taxation, customs and cross border trade, and more. Survey results are made public as The BEEPS-At-A-Glance Country Profiles as well as the Cross Country Report.

== History ==
The first survey was conducted in 1999-2000 to assess the business environment and performance of firms in the countries of Eastern Europe and Central Asia. The sample included about 4000 firms. Since then three other rounds of the survey have been conducted. The 2008-2009 survey covered more than 11,000 firms. The 2008 round survey questionnaire and the sampling methodology were significantly modified, making direct cross-period comparisons problematic. This survey was conducted in the following 28 countries: Albania, Armenia, Azerbaijan, Belarus, Bosnia and Herzegovina, Bulgaria, Croatia, Czech Republic, Estonia, Georgia, Hungary, Kazakhstan, Kyrgyz Republic, Montenegro, Lithuania, Latvia, Macedonia, Moldova, Poland, Russian Federation, Romania, Serbia, Slovak Republic, Slovenia, Tajikistan, Turkey, Ukraine, Uzbekistan.

== Other business surveys ==
Several other projects are conducted with a similar purpose of describing business environment in different countries, most notably The Doing Business Report. Unlike The Doing Business Report, BEEPS are only conducted in the countries of Eastern Europe and Central Asia.
