= Dame Annabelle Rankin Award =

The Dame Annabelle Rankin Award was a biennial award presented by the Queensland Branch of the Children's Book Council of Australia.

In 1977, Dame Annabelle Rankin was one of the first people to be made a Life Member of the Queensland Branch of Children’s Book Council of Australia. The inaugural winner was Lyn Linning in 2004 and the most recent winner was James Moloney in 2018.

== Winners ==
Dame Annabelle Rankin Award winners
Year	Winner	Ref.
2004	Lyn Linning	
2005	Jill Morris	
2006	Kerry Mallan	
2007	David Cox	
2009	Jenny Stubbs	
2011	Robyn Sheahan-Bright	
2013	Judith Russell	
2016	Leonie Tyle	
2018	James Moloney	

== See also ==
- List of CBCA Awards
- List of Australian literary awards
