= Lu Rees =

Book collector and children's literature advocate (1901–1983)

Lu Rees AM MBE
- Born: Lucy Frances Harvey Waugh; 19 September 1901; Armidale, New South Wales
- Died: 23 January 1983 (aged 81); Canberra
- Occupations: Bookseller, book collector

Lucy Frances Harvey "Lu" Rees AM MBE (19 September 1901 – 23 January 1983) was an Australian bookseller, book collector and children's literature advocate. She founded the National Centre for Australian Children's Literature

== Life and career ==
Rees was born Lucy Frances Harvey Waugh at Guy Fawkes Station in Armidale, New South Wales on 19 September 1901. She was interested in literature from an early age, reading poetry and the classics in her father's collection.

Rees married in October 1925 and moved to Bogan Gate. She and her husband, Wilfred Rees, moved together to Brisbane in 1931, where Rees opened an office of the Australian War Memorial. In Brisbane she also became a member of the Queensland Bibliographic Society, the group responsible for establishing the John Oxley Library as a centre for studies relating specifically to Queensland.

Rees and her family moved to Canberra in 1938 and she became a research assistant to Dr Graham Butler, writer of the official history of the Australian Army Medical Services. She opened Cheshire's bookshop in Garema Place in 1955. In 1950 she had been appointed the first secretary of the Canberra branch of the Fellowship of Australian Writers. She stayed with the fellowship until 1975.

In 1957 Rees founded the Canberra Children's Book Council, becoming its first president. The council's first meeting in October 1957, at University House, saw more than 20 Canberra organisations represented, including the parents and citizens' associations of most Canberran schools and other children's and community bodies.

Rees and her husband divorced in 1962. Rees left her position as manager of Cheshire's bookshop in January 1968, with plans to go on a trip abroad before setting up an Australian book information service. In mid-1968 she embarked on a three-month world tour with her youngest son Lauron; it was Rees' first time overseas. They visited Israel, Istanbul, Greece, Italy, Germany, Switzerland, the Netherlands, England, Canada and the United States.

In 1980, having amassed a collection of more than 1500 children's books, Rees officially deposited the collection in the Canberra College of Advanced Education Library.

Rees died on 23 January 1983 in Canberra.

== Awards ==
Rees was appointed a Member of the Order of the British Empire in 1964. She was made a Member of the Order of Australia in 1983. Her collection of children's books and manuscripts became the Lu Rees Archives, which is now known as the National Centre for Australian Children's Literature.

Posthumously, Rees was awarded the Dromkeen Medal for services to children's literature.

Rees' family presented her medals to the University of Canberra in June 2005 so that the medals could be stored at the Lu Rees Archives.
