= C. J. Sage =

American poet and artist

C. J. Sage is an American poet and artist best known for her precise wordplay, internal rhymes, and lyrical poetry. Sage was also the editor of the National Poetry Review and Press until 2015.

== Biography ==
C. J. Sage was born and raised in California.

After taking her M.F.A. in Creative Writing/Poetry at San Jose State University, she taught poetry, writing, and literature at De Anza and Hartnell College.

She is author of four collections of poetry, most recently, Open House (Salmon Poetry, 2017). Her third collection was The San Simeon Zebras (Salmon Poetry, 2010). Her second collection, Odyssea (Word Press, 2007), is a gender role-reversal of the Odyssey tale retold in modern times. Her first collection is, Let's Not Sleep (Dream Horse Press, 2001). Sage has also edited one animal rights poetry anthology, And We the Creatures (Dream Horse Press, 2003), and one literature textbook Field Notes in Contemporary Literature (Dream Horse Press, 2005). Her poems have appeared in The Antioch Review, Barrow Street, Black Warrior Review, Boston Review, Copper Nickel, Orion, Ploughshares, POOL, Prairie Schooner, Shenandoah, The Southeast Review, The Threepenny Review, and others. She has also judged many poetry book contests, including those for her first publisher.

Sage resides in Rio del Mar, California, a coastal town on the Monterey Bay.
