= A Bridge to Wiseman's Cove =

1996 novel by James Moloney

- Author: James Moloney
- Language: English
- Genre: Young adult novel
- Published: 1996 (UQP)
- Publication place: Australia

A Bridge to Wiseman's Cove (1996) is a novel by Australian author James Moloney. The novel features the life of a 15-year-old boy, Carl Matt, and his dysfunctional family, who begin to suffer from physical and emotional problems after his mother's disappearance.

== Plot summary ==
When Carl Matt's mother, Kerry Matt, disappears, his sister Sarah sends him and his brother Harley to Wattle Beach to live with their Aunt Beryl. Aunt Beryl doesn't want them to stay with her and after numerous encounters with the police she says Carl has to get a job to pay his Aunt. He tries to work for Skip Duncan on his barge. He later is rejected. He learns this is because his grandfather had an accident that crippled Skip for life, and accidentally killed his son. After some consideration, Skip reluctantly lets Carl work on his barge.

After numerous events that boost the popularity of Skip's barge, including a free car washing business in the barge, it is eventually revealed that a bridge will be built and therefore put all barges out of business.

In the end, it is discovered that Kerry Matt died in a bus accident when she was trying to get home to her children, Sarah, Harley and Carl. Once this is unearthed, Carl returns home to find that Aunt Beryl has run off in true Matt spirit to join her boyfriend, Bruce. Because Carl has nowhere else to stay, Joy Duncan invites him to come and live with them at Wiseman's Cove with his brother, Harley, who has already claimed the Duncans as his surrogate family.

== Characters ==
Carl Matt - Carl Matt is the protagonist of "A Bridge to Wiseman's Cove". Carl is 15 years of age and is described as a low self-esteemed child. He is the second eldest of the three Matt siblings (Sarah, Carl and Harley). Carl's mother, Kerry, abandons him and his two other siblings. This makes Carl feel neglected and at the same time worried for his mother's well-being as she is nowhere to be found. Throughout the story, Carl struggles through many obstacles; however, with the help of his new friends soon to meet, he is able to grow and become more confident about himself and towards others. He struggles to find friends in this vast ocean of bodies. He is also described as having a large, cumbersome body.

Kerry Matt - Kerry Matt is the mother of the main protagonist, Carl. She is also the mother of Sarah, (Carl's older Sister) and Harley, (Carl's younger brother). Throughout the novel, it is said that Kerry is known for going on what her children call 'holidays'. In her last 'holiday', she does not come back. It is revealed that she had three different male partners in her lifetime, and struggled meeting ends as a single mother.

Sarah Matt - Carl and Harley's older sister is Sarah, who had become accustomed to taking care of them during Kerry's 'holidays'. After some time of caring for Carl and Harley, she too left to go her own holiday in which she doesn't return.

Harley Matt - Little brother of Carl and Sarah, who spends most his time outside on his bike, unless he is called to eat. He also commits a few acts of vandalism in the book.

Skip Duncan - Owner of the barge Carl works on and husband to Joy. Skip initially is reluctant to hire Carl as he is a Matt, but begins to trust and eventually rely on him. Skip is bossy and stubborn and earns little income from his business of ferrying cars across the cove.

Joy Duncan - Joy is Skip's wife. In the novel, she is portrayed to be a kind, loving motherly figure. Although her son had died because of Carl's grandfather, she had shown little contempt towards him, and eventually adopted Carl and Harley into the Duncan household.

Beryl Matt - Beryl Matt is Carl Matt's aunt, who is an alcoholic, smoking gambler with a rough personality who is forced to care for Carl and Harley. She only took them under her wing due to the welfare payment which had been redirected to her address, and forced Carl out of school to be employed in order for them to remain in the household.

Bruce Trelfo - Bruce is the Boyfriend of Beryl Matt, runs a towing service on Wattle Beach, and is revealed near the end of the story to be holding shares in the Wattle Lady, a competing barge to Skip's. He is shown to be a dodgy character, willing to take advantage of customers whenever necessary.

Justine Ivanov - The best friend of Maddie Duncan, and later the girlfriend of Carl Matt, is referred to as ‘a queen at making pizza’.

Maddie Duncan - The daughter of Skip and Joy Duncan. When Carl first arrives on Wattle Beach, he immediately falls in love with her, and later becomes a family friend.

Nathan Trelfo - Maddie Duncan's boyfriend (whom she starts to hate after the arrival of Carl in the Wattle Beach), brother of Bruce Trelfo, does not like Carl Matt.

Nugent- Shopkeeper in Wattle Beach, does not like Harley for stealing sweets from his shop.
