= 13 Stories =

Musical Group

13 Stories is an Atlanta, Georgia based pop-band. Keyboards and leading vocals are provided by Cheri D, lead guitar is by Cat, bass guitar is by J3, and drums are by Max. They have released a CD entitled FunkyPopSexyHouseRap with the single Beep! Beep!. Beep! Beep! was used in 2006 for a series of television commercials for Ford automobiles which featured not only the song, but also the band playing it.
