= Ipswich Poetry Feast =

The Ipswich Poetry Feast is an annual literary event held in Australia since 2003. Sponsored by the Ipswich City Council, the competition aims to encourage the writing of poetry and raise community awareness of this literary art through an annual international showcase event highlighting the vibrant and rich cultural diversity of the region. It attracts participants from throughout the country along with some international entries.
