= IBBY Australia =

The International Board on Books for Young People (IBBY) is a nonprofit organization to bring books and children together. In 1966, IBBY Australia was established and Ena Noël became its first president and remained in this role for over 20 years.

== IBBY Award Honours ==
In 1986 both Hans Christian Andersen Awards were won by Australians, Patricia Wrightson for writing and Robert Ingpen for illustration.

== IBBY Honour List – Australian Titles ==
The IBBY Honour List is a biennial selection of outstanding, recently published books, honoring writers, illustrators and translators from IBBY member countries. The titles are selected by the National Sections of IBBY who are invited to nominate books characteristic of their country and suitable to recommend for publication in different languages. One book can be nominated for each of the three categories: writing, illustration and translation.

Over the years many Australian children's authors and illustrators have been included in the Honour List:

- 1962 Under the entry for Great Britain Writer: Nan Chauncy. Tangara, illustrated by Brian Wildsmith. London OUP 1961
- 1970 Writer: Patricia Wrightson I Own the Racecourse. London Hutchinson. 1969
- 1971 Illustrator: Ted Greenwood Joseph and Lulu and the Prindiville House Pigeons. Sydney A & R 1972
- 1972 Writer: Colin Thiele Blue Fin. Adelaide Rigby 1969
- 1973 Illustrator: Kilmeny & Deborah Niland Mulga Bill's Bicycle by A. B. Paterson Sydney Collins 1973
- 1974 Writer: Ivan Southall Josh. A & R
- 1976 Illustrator: Robert Ingpen The Runaway Punt Adelaide Rigby
- 1976 Writer: Patricia Wrightson The Nargun and the Stars. Syd. Hutchinson.
- 1978 Illustrator: Percy Trezise and Dick Roughsey The Quinkins Sydney. William Collins. 1978
- 1978 Writer: Eleanor Spence The October Child Melbourne OUP
- 1980 Illustrator: Heather Philpott The Rainforest Children OUP 1980
- 1980 Writer: Lilith Norman A Dream of Seas. Sydney Collins
- 1982 Illustrator: Pamela Allen Who Sank the Boat Thomas Nelson 1982
- 1982 Writer: Ruth Park Playing Beatie Bow Thomas Nelson
- 1984 Illustrator: Julie Vivas Possum Magic, text by Mem Fox. Omnibus 1983
- 1984 Writer: Joan Phipson The Watcher in the Garden Methuen
- 1986 Illustrator: Bob Graham First there was Frances Lothian 1985
- 1986 Writer: Nadia Wheatley Dancing in the Anzac Deli. Melbourne. OUP
- 1987 Illustrator: Jeannie Baker Where the Forest meets the Sea. Julia MacRae 1987
- 1988 Writer: Alan Baillie Riverman Thomas Nelson
- 1990 Illustrator: Rodney McRae Aesop's Fables Margaret Hamilton 1990
- 1990 Writer: Nadia Wheatley and Donna Rawlins My Place. Melbourne Collins Dove
- 1992 Illustrator: Patricia Torres Do Not Go Around the Edges, text by Daisy Utemorrah. Magabala Books 1990
- 1992 Writer: Libby Gleeson Dodger Turton & Chambers.
- 1993 Illustrator: Peter Gouldthorpe First Light, text by Gary Crew Lothian. 1993
- 1994 Writer: Garry Disher Bamboo Flute. A & R
- 1995 Illustrator: John Winch The Old Woman Who Loved to Read Scholastic 1996
- 1996 Writer: Emily Rodda Rowan of Rin. Omnibus
- 1998 Illustrator: Graeme Base The Worst Band in the Universe Viking 1999
- 1998 Writer: Peter Carey The Big Bazoohley. UQP
- 1999 Illustrator: Ron Brooks Fox, text by Margaret Wild Allen & Unwin 2000
- 2000 Writer: Margaret Wild First Day Allen & Unwin
- 2002 Illustrator: Andrew McLean A Year on Our Farm, text by Penny Matthews Omnibus 2002
- 2002 Writer: David Metzenthen Stony Heart Country Penguin
- 2004 Illustrator: Jan Ormerod Lizzie Nonsense Little Hare Press 2004
- 2004 Writer: Simon French Where in the World? Little Hare Press
- 2006 Writer: Sonya Hartnett The Silver Donkey. Viking
- 2008 No candidates submitted
- 2010 Illustrator: Shaun Tan The Arrival. Lothian
- 2010 Writer: Sonya Hartnett The Ghost's Child. Penguin
- 2012 Illustrator: Gregory Rogers The Hero of Little Street. Allen & Unwin
- 2012 Writer: Glenda Millard A Small Free Kiss in the Dark. Allen & Unwin
- 2014 Illustrator: Patricia Mullins Lightning Jack, text by Glenda Millard. Scholastic
- 2014 Writer: Ursula Dubosarsky The Golden Day. Allen & Unwin
- 2016 Illustrator: Freya Blackwood Banjo and Ruby Red, text by Libby Gleeson. Hardie Grant
- 2016 Writer: Felicity Castagna The Incredible Here and Now. Giramondo
- 2018 Illustrator: Matt Ottley Teacup, text by Rebecca Young. Scholastic
- 2018 Writer: Zana Fraillon The Bone Sparrow. Hachette Australia
- 2020 Illustrator: Lisa Kennedy Wilam: A Birrarung Story, text by Joy Wandin Murphy and Andrew Kelly. Black Dog Books
- 2020 Writer: Clare Atkins Between Us. Blank Inc.
- 2022 Illustrator: Philip Bunting Wombat. Omnibus
- 2022 Writer: Vikki Wakefield This is How We Change the Ending. Text

== International Children's Book Day ==
In 1987, Australia hosted International Children's Book Day.

== IBBY Australia Presidents ==
- Ena Noël OAM (1966–1990)
- Juliana Bayfield (1990–2001)
- Dr John Foster (2001–2006)
- Dr Margaret Zeegers (2006–2008)
- Dr Robin Morrow (2009–2018)
- Dr Robyn Sheahan-Bright (2018–current)

== Ena Noël Award for Encouragement ==
Ena Noel Award for Encouragement

In 1994, founding president of IBBY Australia, Ena Noël, founded her own biennial prize - the Ena Noel Award - to encourage young emerging writers and illustrators. The name was chosen so that it was apparent to all concerned that someone highly regarded in the field was fostering young Australian authors and illustrators for children. The award is a mounted silver medallion designed by the first winner of the award, the Australian Aboriginal writer/illustrator Arone Raymond Meeks.

From 1994–2008 this biennial award was presented during the congress of the Australian Library and Information Association (ALIA). From 2010, the award was presented at an independent IBBY Australia function.

Up until 2023, only books by Australian creators published in the two years prior to the particular closing date could be nominated by the publishers for the Ena Noël award. To mark the 30th anniversary there will be two awards, one for a writer and one for an illustrator. Secondly, the nominated creator must be under the age of 35 at the time the title (or titles) for which they are nominated was published. Thirdly, any nominated author or illustrator has to be deemed by the judges to be worthy of encouragement.

The award winners:

- 1994 Arone Raymond Meeks, won for his third picturebook, Enora and the Black Crane (1991)
- 1996 Sonya Hartnett, won for Wilful Blue (1994)
- 1997 Steve Woolman, won a special award for his body of work
- 1998 Tohby Riddle, for The Tip at the End of the Street (1996)
- 2000 Catherine Jinks for Piggy in the Middle (1998)
- 2002 Beth Norling, for Cherryblossom and the Golden Bear (2000)
- 2004 Alyssa Brugman, for Walking Naked
- 2006 Anthony Eaton, for Fireshadow and The girl in the cave
- 2008 Markus Zusak for The Book Thief
- 2010 Lili Wilkinson for Scatterheart
- 2012 Amy Barker for Omega Park
- 2014 Melissa Keil for Life in Outer Space
- 2016 Kate Gordon for Writing Clementine
- 2018 Will Kostakis for The Sidekicks
- 2020 Jack Heath for 500 Minutes of Danger
- 2022 Gary Lonesborough for The Boy from the Mish
- 2024
  - Meg Gatland-Veness for When Only One
  - Holden Sheppard for The Brink
  - Sher Rill Ng, illustrator for Be Careful, Xiao Xin!
