= Anne Ingram =

Anne Ingram may refer to:

- Anne Ingram, Viscountess Irvine (c.1696–1764), British court official
- Anne Bower Ingram (1937–2010), Australian author
- Anne Ingram (New Zealand writer) (born 1947), New Zealand children's author and radio producer
