= Lady Cutler Award =

Australian award for children's literature

The Lady Cutler Award is an Australian children's literature award administered by the Children's Book Council of Australia NSW Branch, for distinguished service to children's literature.

The award was established in 1981 to honor Lady Helen Cutler, the first patron of the Children's Book Council of Australia NSW Branch from 1966 until her death in 1990. Lady Cutler recognised the needs of children and encouraged CBCA NSW Branch members to advance the cause of children's literature throughout New South Wales. Eve Pownall was presented with the inaugural award in 1981.

== Award category and description ==
The Lady Cutler Award is presented for distinguished service in the field of Australian children's literature.

== Winners ==
CBCA NSW Branch Lady Cutler Award Recipients

- 2026 Deborah Abela
- 2024 Dr Bronwyn Bancroft
- 2022 Gail Erskine
- 2020 Libby Hathorn
- 2018 Karen Jameyson
- 2016 Paul Macdonald
- 2015 Heather Fisher
- 2014 Jill B Bruce
- 2013 Vivienne Nicoll-Hatton
- 2012 Professor Robyn Ewing
- 2011 Margaret Wild
- 2010 Sarah Foster
- 2009 Christopher Cheng
- 2008 Dianne (Di) Bates
- 2007 Susanne Gervay
- 2006 Ernie Tucker
- 2005 Val Noake
- 2004 Robin Morrow
- 2003 Donna Rawlins
- 2002 Sandy Campbell
- 2001 Mark Macleod
- 2000 Helen Sykes
- 1999 Miranda Harrowell
- 1998 Kate Colley
- 1997 Libby Gleeson
- 1996 Glenise Meldrum
- 1995 Jean Walter Morgan
- 1994 Jean Ferguson
- 1993 Myra Lee
- 1992 June Smith
- 1991 Margaret Hamilton
- 1990 Jean Chapman
- 1989 Maurice Saxby
- 1988 Lydia Pender
- 1987 Val Watson
- 1986 Patricia Wrightson
- 1985 Walter Cunningham
- 1984 Anne Bower Ingram
- 1983 Ena Noel
- 1982 Joyce Fardell
- 1981 Eve Pownall

== See also ==
- List of Australian literary awards
