= Margaret Hamilton (publisher) =

Australian children's literature publisher (1941–2022)

- Born: Margaret Dawn Watson; 23 June 1941; Surry Hills, New South Wales, Australia
- Died: 24 November 2022 (aged 81); Springwood, New South Wales, Australia
- Occupations: Children's literature publisher and author
- Years active: 1963–2022

Margaret Dawn Hamilton AM (23 June 1941 – 24 November 2022) was an Australian children’s literature publisher who served as the National President of the Children’s Book Council of Australia from 1991 to 1992 and as a National Board Member until April 2017 when she formally retired. She also published seven books.

== Early life ==
Margaret Hamilton was born in Surry Hills, Sydney. Her family moved to Parramatta when she was around 10 years old. She attended Macarthur Girls High School. As a child, she did not have access to picture books but read comic books given to her by her uncle and did not enjoy the books she was required to read in her high school days.

== Career ==
Hamilton studied librarianship in her higher education at the University of Sydney. Following her schooling, she first worked as a librarian at the Parramatta City Library where she was a children's librarian. During her librarianship, she encountered Maurice Saxby, a well known figure in the children's book industry, whom she credits with inspiring her passion towards children's books, for sixteen years and then a bookseller in a bookshop. She also worked at the publishing company Hodder & Stoughton Australia eventually becoming Director of Publishing there.

In 1987, she discontinued her current job as Director of Publishing at Hodder & Stoughton to begin her own publishing company Margaret Hamilton Books with her husband Max Hamilton. Her philosophy in starting the company Margaret Hamilton Books was 'that children have a right to the best of everything, especially books’.

To promote Margaret Hamilton Books, Hamilton personally attended book fairs such as the Bologna Children's Book Fair, a fair centred around the children's book industry in Italy, 27 times in order to promote her books to a widespread audience. She received the Dromkeen Medal and Nan Chauncy Award in 2004. In 2008, she also received the Order of Australia Medal, ‘for service to the arts through the promotion of children’s literature and literacy and through support for authors and illustrators’. Margaret Hamilton Books, was an imprint of Scholastic Australia from 1996 to 2001.

Hamilton served as National President of the Children’s Book Council of Australia from 1991 to 1992, and was a National Board Member of the CBCA until April 2017 when she formally retired.

Margaret Hamilton retired from publishing in 2001 but occasionally worked with other children's books authors and illustrators such as Glenda Millard, Stephen Michael King, and Patricia Mullins as a freelancer.

On 13 November 2010, she opened a centre for children's books in a cottage called Pinerolo in Blackheath in the Blue Mountains. Her aim for Pinerolo is to “promote Australian picture books and their creators, educate children and adults about picture books, provide a venue for the exhibition of original artwork and bring people interested in picture books together in an inspiring environment.” Pinerolo, the children’s book cottage, contains the biggest collection of original picture book artworks in all of New South Wales. It also has a research library collection of children’s books. The cottage also has regular programs, courses, workshops, and school talks with authors and illustrators affiliated with the centre. It also serves as a peaceful retreat location and residence for children’s books writers and artists.

In 2014, she published her first picture book B is for Bedtime (illustrated by Anna Pignataro). Her second picture book Counting Through the Day was published in May 2016 at the Children's Book Council of Australia annual National Conference.

== Personal life and death ==
She met her husband Max Hamilton who was a fellow librarian at the Parramatta City Library and married him in 1967. They had their daughter Melissa Hamilton in 1981 who also worked in the children's book industry where she was a bookseller as well as an educational specialist who worked with her mother as creative director at Pinerolo.

Hamilton died on 24 November 2022 in Springwood, New South Wales. She was surrounded by family, her husband Max and daughter Melissa.

== Awards ==
- 1991 Lady Cutler Award from The Children's Book Council of Australia New South Wales Branch
- 1998 Pixie O'Harris Award
- 2004 Dromkeen Medal
- 2004 Nan Chauncy Award
- 2006 Distinguished Services Citation from The Children's Book Council of Australia
- 2008 Member of Order of Australia - "For service to the arts through the promotion of children's literature and literacy and through support for authors and illustrators."
- 2014 Children's Book Council of Australia Notable Book for B IS FOR BEDTIME
- 2022 Children's Book Council of Australia Notable Book for RAINBOW DAYS

=== Works ===
- The picture people: illustrators of contemporary Australian picture books (1993)
- Life's little guide to children's books (1995)
- The ABC book of Australian children's illustrators (2005)
- Creative connections: Blue Mountains writers and artists (2009)
- B IS FOR BEDTIME (illustrated by Anna Pignataro) (Little Hare Books, 2014)
- COUNTING THROUGH THE DAY (illustrated by Anna Pignataro) (Little Hare Books, 2016)
- RAINBOW DAYS (illustrated by Anna Pignataro) (Little Hare Books, 2022)
