= School Magazine =

Australian children's magazine

The School Magazine
- Categories: Children's magazine
- Frequency: 10 per year
- Founded: 1916
- Company: New South Wales Department of Education and Communities
- Country: Australia
- Based in: Darlinghurst, New South Wales
- Language: English
- Website: theschoolmagazine.com.au

The School Magazine is a literary magazine for children which has been published continuously by the New South Wales Department of Education and Communities in its many incarnations since its first issue in 1916. It was originally subtitled 'A Magazine of Literature for Our Boys and Girls'. Established during World War One, the magazine was intended to expand the range of reading material available to New South Wales primary school students. Stephen Henry Smith was the magazine's first editor, followed by Doris Chadwick, who held the position of editor from 1922 to 1959. Over its 100-year history, its editors have included some of the best known names of Australian children's literature: Noreen Shelley, Patricia Wrightson, Lilith Norman, Duncan Ball, Anna Fienberg, Jonathan Shaw and Tohby Riddle. The list of past and present editorial staff features many authors who have been recognised by awards or by popular acclaim: these include Joanne Horniman, Dianne Bates, Cassandra Golds, Margrete Lamond, Geoffrey McSkimming, Ursula Dubosarsky and Sue Murray. Some of the many illustrators are Kim Gamble, Tohby Riddle, Aaron Blabey, Stephen Axelsen, Noela Young, Sheila Hawkins, Craig Phillips, Sarah Davis and David Legge. The School Magazine publishes four literary magazines for children: Countdown (ISSN 1440-4907), Blast Off (ISSN 1440-4885), Orbit (ISSN 1440-4893) and Touchdown (ISSN 1440-4877. Each 36-page full-colour magazine contains a mix of stories, plays, poetry, nonfiction articles, book reviews, puzzles, comic serials and other texts.

Published continually since February 1916, the School Magazine is the oldest magazine in Australia and the longest running literary magazine for children in the world.

== See also ==
- List of literary magazines
