= Nadia Wheatley =

Australian writer

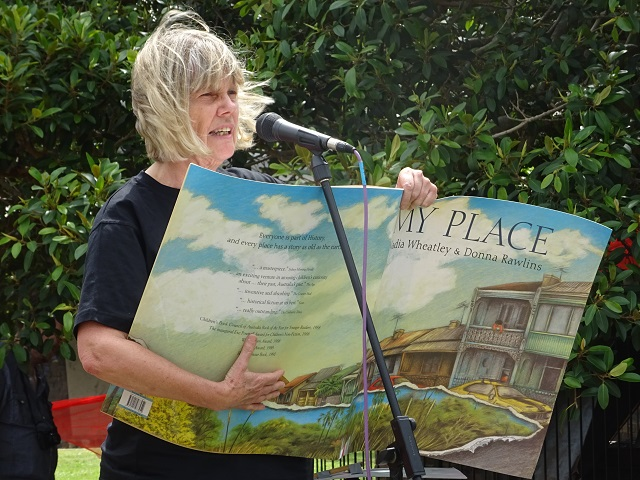
- Wheatley in 2015
- Born: 30 April 1949 (age 77); Sydney, New South Wales, Australia
- Occupation: Writer
- Known for: Children's fiction, historical fiction, short stories, articles
- Website: www.nadiawheatley.com

Nadia Wheatley (born 30 April 1949) is an Australian writer whose work includes picture books, novels, biography and history. Perhaps best known for her classic picture book My Place (illustrated by Donna Rawlins), the author's biography of Charmian Clift was described by critic Peter Craven as 'one of the greatest Australian biographies'. Another book by Wheatley is A Banner Bold, a historical novel.

While some of the author's books for children and young adults have been honoured in the annual awards of the Children's Book Council of Australia, in 2014 Nadia was nominated by IBBY Australia for the Hans Christian Andersen Award for Writing — the highest international recognition given to a living author whose complete works have made a lasting contribution to children's literature.

In 2014 Wheatley was admitted by the University of Sydney to the degree of Doctor of Letters (honoris causa), in recognition of 'her exceptional creative achievements in the field of children's and adult literature, her work as a historian and her contribution to our understanding of Indigenous issues, cultural diversity, equity and social justice and the environment through story'.

== Life ==
Nadia Wheatley was born in Sydney. She was educated at Meriden School, the University of Sydney (BA Hons 1970) and Macquarie University (MA Hons 1976).

In 1975, Wheatley went to Greece to live, with her then-partner, poet Martin Johnston, son of Australian writers George Johnston and Charmian Clift. It was there that she began to write seriously. The couple lived in the town of Chania, Crete, and in a coastal village in the Peloponnese, and had a routine of writing six days a week. On her return to Australia in 1978, Wheatley lived in the Sydney suburb of Newtown, which provided the setting for her first three books — Five Times Dizzy, Dancing in the Anzac Deli and The House that was Eureka.

After spending some years in Apollo Bay, Victoria, and the Blue Mountains, the author returned to Sydney in 1995, where she lives in the Cooks River Valley — the ‘place’ of her classic picture book, My Place.

== Career ==
Wheatley's first book, Five Times Dizzy (1983) was acclaimed as Australia's first multicultural book for children. Awarded the New South Wales Premier's Literary Awards Special Children's Book Award, it became a television mini-series that went to air on the new multicultural channel SBS in 1986.

The picture book, My Place, has also been produced as television mini-series 26-part television adaptation, with Nadia Wheatley acting as history consultant and story consultant. Released on the ABC in 2009 and 2011, My Place was acknowledged as Most Outstanding Children's Series in the 2012 Logie Awards.

Wheatley also used her background as a historian in the writing of the historical novel, The House That Was Eureka (1986), set in the turbulent anti-eviction battles of the Great Depression. Described by critic Maurice Saxby as ‘a novel of enduring significance’, this was republished in 2014 as a Text Classic.

While Wheatley was producing these books for children and young adults, she was also researching and writing a biography of the acclaimed Australian author, Charmian Clift. Published by HarperCollins, The Life and Myth of Charmian Clift won The Age Book of the Year — Non Fiction (2001) and the Australian History Prize in the New South Wales Premier's History Awards (2002).

Over the last decade, Nadia Wheatley has collaborated with artist Ken Searle to produce a set of non-fiction books that exemplify the Papunya Model of Education — an Indigenous curriculum model that puts the Country at the centre of learning.

This journey began during the period 1998 to 2001, when Wheatley and Searle worked as consultants at the school at Papunya (an Aboriginal community in the Western Desert, Northern Territory). While assisting the Anangu staff and students to develop resources for their curriculum, the two consultants helped produce the multi-award-winning Papunya School Book of Country and History (Allen & Unwin, 2002).

Wheatley and Searle subsequently took part in the Australian Society of Authors funded mentorship program for Indigenous authors, supporting Papunya artist and teacher, Mary Malbunka, to write and illustrate her picture book memoir, When I Was Little, Like You (2003, Allen & Unwin).

In 2026, Wheatley published Strange New World: Belsen’s First Year of Freedom, an account of the first year post liberation at Bergen-Belsen concentration camp.

== "Going Bush" project ==
Going Bush
- Author: Nadia Wheatley
- Illustrator: Ken Searle
- Language: English
- Genre: Children's non-fiction
- Publisher: Allen and Unwin
- Publication date: March 2007
- Publication place: Australia
- Media type: Print (hardback)
- ISBN: 978-1-74114-911-1
- OCLC: 174105642

Nadia's book Going Bush grew out of a Harmony Day project developed in 2003 by eight inner-Sydney city schools. The initial plan was to break down barriers between the communities but it developed into a larger project which included learning about the environment, Indigenous culture, and living in multicultural communities, and involved sixteen Muslim, Catholic and government schools. In 2005 Nadia Wheatley and Ken Searle were invited by the committee to work with the children on "the theme of freedom". Wheatley and Searle used an educational model they had developed with others in the 1990s at Papunya School in Central Australia which "puts country at the core of the curriculum". The result was the book, Going Bush, which captures what the children learnt through exploring a section of urban bushland along Wolli Creek.

== Awards and nominations ==
=== Five Times Dizzy ===
- New South Wales Premier's Literary Awards Special Children's Book Award (1983)
- Highly Commended – CBCA Children's Book of the Year: Older Readers (1983)
- Honorary Diploma – International Board on Books for Young People (1983)
- AWGIE Awards for Best Adaptation, Children's Television Drama (for the television mini-series) (1987)

=== Dancing in the Anzac Deli ===
- Commended – CBCA Children's Book of the Year Award: Older Readers (1984)
- Honorary Diploma – International Board on Books for Young People (1985)

=== The House that Was Eureka ===
- Shortlisted – The Australian/Vogel Literary Award (1984)
- New South Wales Premier's Literary Awards Children's Book Award (1985)
- Commended – CBCA Children's Book of the Year Award: Older Readers (1985)

=== My Place ===
- Won – CBCA Children's Book of the Year Award: Younger Readers
- Won – CBCA Children's Book of the Year Award: Eve Pownall Award for Information Books
- Won – Kids' Own Australian Literature Award (1988)
- Won – White Raven Award Award (1988)
- Won – Young Australian Best Book Awards (1990)
- Honorary Diploma – International Board on Books for Young People (1990)
- Listed US Library Best Books for Young People (1988)

=== Lucy in the Leap Year ===
- Shortlisted – CBCA Children's Book of the Year Award: Younger Readers (1994)
- Shortlisted – New South Wales Ministry for the Arts Awards (1994)
- Shortlisted – Multicultural Award (1994)

=== The Night Tolkien Died ===
- Honour Book – CBCA Children's Book of the Year Award: Older Readers (1995)

=== Highway ===
- Honour Book – CBCA (1999)

=== Papunya School Book of Country and History ===
- Shortlisted – CBCA (2002)

=== The Life and Myth of Charmian Clift ===
- Won – NSW History Awards: The Australian History Prize (2002)

=== Going Bush ===
- Shortlisted – Australian Awards for Excellence in Educational Publishing (2007)

=== Australians All ===
- Winner, NSW Premier's History Award, Young People's History Award, 2014

== Selected bibliography ==
=== Children's ===
- Five Times Dizzy (1982, Oxford University Press)
- Dancing in the Anzac Deli (1984, Oxford University Press)
- The House that Was Eureka (1985, Viking Kestrel)
- 1 is for One (illus. Helen Leitch, 1986, Oxford University Press)
- My Place (illus. Donna Rawlins, 1987, Collins Dove)
- Lucy in the Leap Year (1993, Omnibus)
- The Night Tolkien Died (1994, Random House)
- The Greatest Treasure of Charlemagne the King (illus. Deborah Klein, 1997)
- Highway (illus. Andrew McLean, 1998)
- Luke's Way of Looking (illus. Matt Ottley, 1999)
- Vigil (2000, Viking)
- Papunya School Book of Country and History (2002, illus, Ken Searle; in collaboration with Anangu staff and students, Papunya School)
- A Banner Bold: The Diary of Rosa Aarons, Ballarat goldfield, 1854 (2000, Scholastic)
- Listening to Mondrian (2006, Allen and Unwin)
- Going Bush (illus. Ken Searle, 2007, Allen and Unwin)
- Playground (illus. Ken Searle, 2011, Allen and Unwin)
- Australians All (illus. Ken Searle, 2013, Allen and Unwin)
- Flight (illus. Armin Greder, 2015, Windy Hollow Books)

=== Adult ===
- The Life and Myth of Charmian Clift (2001, HarperCollinsPublishers)
- Her Mother's Daughter (2018, Text Publishing)
- Strange New World: Belsen’s First Year of Freedom (2026, Monash University Publishing)
