= Robin Morrow =

Australian writer and academic

Robin Morrow AM
- Born: Robin Moncrieff Morrow; 1942 (age 83–84); Australia
- Education: Meriden School; University of Sydney
- Occupations: Lecturer; critic; editor
- Known for: Children's literature criticism and advocacy
- Awards: Pixie O'Harris Award (1996); John Hirst Award (1998); Lady Cutler Award (2004); Member of the Order of Australia (2014)

Robin Morrow AM (born 1942) is an Australian lecturer, critic and editor in children's literature. She is a past president of the Australian section of the International Board on Books for Young People IBBY Australia.

== Early life ==
Robin Moncrieff Morrow was born in 1942. She was educated at Meriden School and at Sydney University. She spent some years teaching English, French and ESL (English as a Second Language).

== Australian children's literature expert ==
In 1971, together with her mother, Beryl Moncrieff Matthews, opened The Children's Bookshop, Beecroft, the first specialist children's bookshop in New South Wales. Robin managed the shop for 25 years.

Robin has taught children's literature courses at Macquarie University, Australian Catholic University, University of Technology, Sydney and Simmons College, Boston. Robin has reviewed children's books for The Weekend Australian and other review journals.

Her work on literary judging panels includes:

- NSW judge for the Children's Book Council of Australia national awards 2001–2002
- NSW Premier's Literary Awards
- Dorothea Mackellar National Poetry Competition for Schools
- International Board on Books for Young People Hans Christian Andersen Awards

== Awards ==
- 1996: Pixie O'Harris Award for Dedicated and Distinguished Service to the Development and Reputation of Australian Children's Literature
- 1998: John Hirst Award for outstanding service to teacher librarianship and school libraries in New South Wales
- 2004: Lady Cutler Award for Distinguished Service to Children’s Literature in NSW (Children's Book Council of Australia, NSW)
- 2014: Member (AM) in the General Division of the Order of Australia

== Works ==
- Indigenous languages in some Australian picture books. Presented at IBBY International Congress, Santiago de Compostela 2010
- Ursula Dubosarsky: In Love with Language in Magpies Vol 26 no 3 July 2011;
- Advocate for Children's Literature : Maurice Saxby in Magpies vol. 25 no. 1 March 2010;
- Reviews and commentary articles in The Weekend Australian;
- Articles in Sydney’s Child; Classroom magazine; Bookseller and Publisher; Magpies and other journals
- Robin Morrow. (2007). Surreal Picturebooks: Binette Schroeder and Anthony Browne. Bookbird: A Journal of International Children's Literature (3)
- Robin Morrow. (2009). Mapping Australia’s past in picture books. Bookbird: A Journal of International Children's Literature 47(2), 18-26.
- 'A reality check: the challenges of publishing and selling books for children' in Scates, B (ed) A Future for the Past: The State of Children's History, History Council of NSW 2004
- 'Case study: Penguins and Puffins' in Paper empires: a history of the book in Australia 1946-2005 By Craig Munro, Robyn Sheahan-Bright pp. 307
- Robin Morrow (1999) More of a Club Than a Bookshop — The Children's Bookshop, Beecroft: The First 25 Years
- Morrow, Robin; King, Stephen Michael; Morrow, Robin, 1942- (1996), Beetle soup : Australian stories and poems for children, Scholastic Australia, ISBN 978-1-86388-592-8 Shortlisted for CBCA Book of the Year Award, Younger Readers, reissued in paperback as King, Stephen Michael; Morrow, Robin, 1942- (2004), And the 'roo jumped over the moon : Australian stories and poems for children ([New] ed.), Scholastic Press, ISBN 978-1-86504-782-9
