= Fardell =

Fardell is a surname. Notable people with the surname include:

- Dawn Fardell (born 1947), Australian politician
- George Fardell (1833–1917), British Conservative Party politician
- John Fardell (born 1967), English cartoonist
- Joyce Fardell (1923–2007), Australian teacher librarian

== See also ==
- Fardel (disambiguation)
