= Nan Chauncy Award =

Australian award for children's literature

The Nan Chauncy Award is an Australian children's literature award. It was initially established as a quinquennial award and is now presented biennially in the Children's Book Council Awards.

The award was established to honour Nan Chauncy, who is recognised as a significant Tasmanian author.

== Award category and description ==
The Nan Chauncy Award is to recognise a person’s outstanding contribution to the field of children’s literature in Australia.

== Winners ==
Nan Chauncy Award winners
Year	Winner	Ref.
1983	Marcie Muir	
1988	Joyce Oldmeadow	
1993	Laurie Copping	
1998	Walter McVitty AM	
2000	Belle Alderman	
2002	Maurice Saxby AM	
2004	Margaret Hamilton AM	
2006	Muriel Barwell	
2008	Margaret Wild	
2010	Lesley Reece	
2012	Robyn Sheahan-Bright	
2015	Libby Gleeson	
2017	Mem Fox	
2019	James Moloney	
2021	Jan Nicholls	
2023	Jenny Stubbs	
2025	Wendy Rapee	

== See also ==
- List of Australian literary awards
