= Sheila Hawkins =

Australian war artist and children's author/illustrator

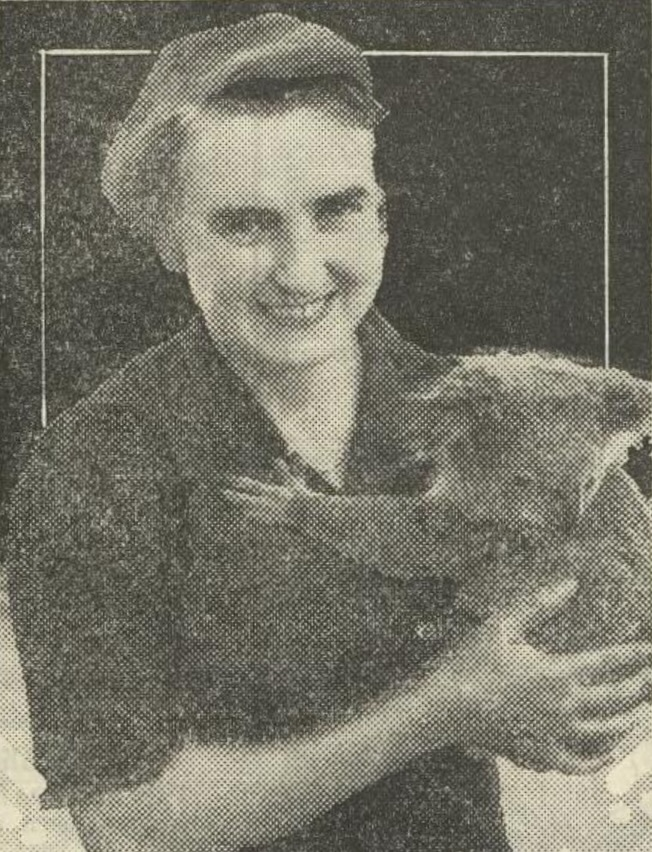
- Born: Sheila Margaret Hawkins; 20 August 1905; Kalgoorlie, Western Australia
- Died: 10 January 1999 (aged 93); London, England
- Other names: Sheila Margaret Bowden
- Occupation(s): Children's book author/illustrator, war artist, commercial artist

Sheila Margaret Hawkins (20 August 1905 – 10 January 1999) was an Australian war artist and author/illustrator of children's books.

== Early life and education ==
Hawkins was born in Kalgoorlie, Western Australia on 20 August 1905 to Beatrice Mary (née Edwards) and Geoffrey Oswald Hawkins. Her father was an architect and surveyor and the family moved to Perth and later to Melbourne when he enlisted to serve in World War I in 1915.

She completed her secondary education at Toorak College and began studies at the National Gallery Art School in Melbourne in 1923. She was, however, forced to withdraw and find work as a commercial artist to support herself financial. By 1927 she had saved sufficient funds to enrol a commercial art course at Swinburne Technical College.

== Career ==
Hawkins' first job was in the art department at The Sun News-Pictorial. She became a member of the Victorian Artists' Society (VAS) in 1928. While working at a printing company she showed some of her works at the VAS Spring exhibition. The Herald critic, J. S. MacDonald, described her art as "good black and white work".

In 1932 she went to England with Margaret Brown, who wrote Black Tuppenny, which was published by Heinemann with Hawkins' illustrations. She was employed by an advertising company. Two years later she spent a year in Catalonia with two friends, painting and living frugally.

In 1936 she married Hugh Max Bowden but continued to work under her maiden name. The couple lived in London from 1937 where she began working for Hamish Hamilton, who published two of her books the following year.

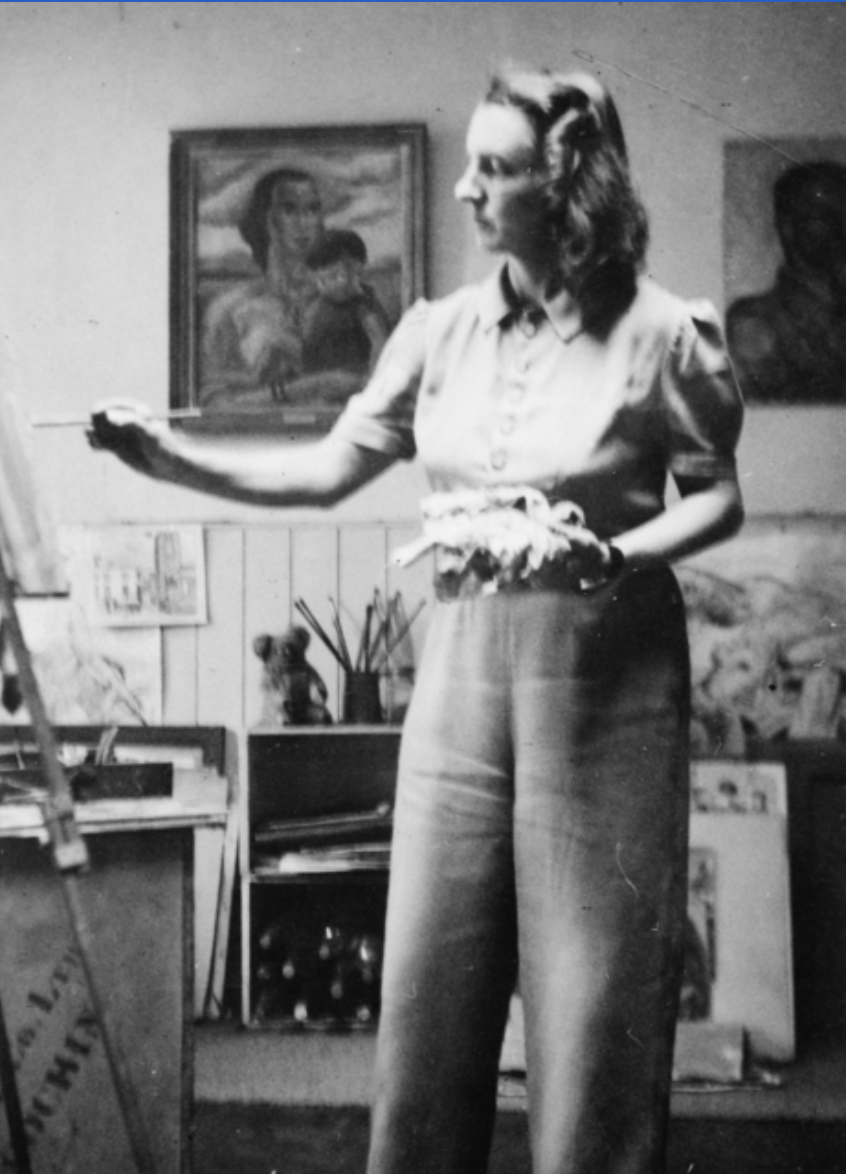
Hawkins, painting in London, c. 1944

During World War II, she worked in public relations at the headquarters of the RAAF in London. She began portraits of four airmen but, before she could complete them, was sent to Wales to work with the RAF in their Secret Records section. Later she visited Scotland where she painted members of the Australian Forestry Unit working in the snow. She sought accreditation as an official war artist, but was unsuccessful.

Her only child, Anna, was born in 1945 and her marriage failed due to her husband's adultery. In 1948 she and her daughter moved to Sydney, where Hawkins contributed stories and illustrations to the School Magazine. An illustration based on her daughter was used three times on its cover, the editor Noreen Shelley saying, "It's a marvellous Book Week cover".

She won the 1956 Children's Book of the Year Award: Picture Book for Wish and the Magic Nut by Peggy Barnard.

Hawkins died in London on 10 January 1999 and was cremated.

== Selected works ==
- Black Tuppenny (1932)
- Pepito (1938)
- Appleby John (1938)
- Australian Animals and Birds (1962)
- More Animals (1968)
