= Fardel =

Fardel may refer to:

- Shakespearean word meaning "traveller's bundle", as used in The Winter's Tale
- Shakespearean word meaning "burden", as used in Hamlet's To be, or not to be speech
- Scots word, also spelled "Farl", quadrant-shaped flatbread or cake
- the omasum, third compartment of the stomach in ruminants
- Fardel Manor, medieval manor and house in South Hams, Devon

== See also ==
- Fardell, a surname
