= Susanne Gervay =

Australian author

Susanne Gervay OAM
- Born: Sydney
- Education: University of Sydney; UNSW Sydney; UTS Sydney
- Occupation: Author
- Writing career
- Genre: Fiction

Susanne Julia Gervay is an Australian author for children and young people, and an advocate for children’s literature and human rights. In 2007 she was awarded the Lady Cutler Award for distinguished services to children's literature and in 2011 the Order of Australia Medal for service to children's literature, and to professional organisations. She was awarded the Lifetime Social Justice Literature Award for her books by the International Literacy Association.

== Early life ==
Gervay was born in Sydney, child of Hungarian refugees. Gervay attended Daceyville Public School and SCEGGS Darlinghurst. She trained as a teacher at University of Sydney, completing a Master of Education from the University of New South Wales and a Master of Arts from the University of Technology, Sydney. She has two children.

== Career ==
Gervay founded The Hughenden Boutique Hotel, a literary and arts hotel in Woollahra, New South Wales in 1993.

Her younger fiction in the I Am Jack series are rites-of-passage books focusing on school bullying reaching adults and children. The first instalment has been adapted into a play by the Monkey Baa Theatre for Young People. I Am Jack is the first of four books including Super Jack, Always Jack and Being Jack. Her young adult literature includes Butterflies, The Cave and That's Why I Wrote This Song which is a collaborative work with her teenage daughter who wrote and sings the songs that are part of the book.

Gervay is included in an anthology together with Sir Salman Rushdie, David Malouf, Thomas Keneally, entitled Fear Factor Terror Incognito, edited by Meenakshi Bharat and Sharon Rundle.

Gervay was awarded the Lady Cutler Award for Distinguished Services to Children's Literature in 2007, UTS Award for Excellence and an Order of Australia Medal in 2011. She was nominated for the Astrid Lindgren Memorial Award in 2020.

=== Advocacy ===
Gervay is Co-Regional Advisor of the Society of Children's Book Writers and Illustrators (SCBWI) Australia East and New Zealand.

==== Bullying at school ====
As a specialist in child growth and development and author, Gervay was inspired by a son's experience of school bullying, to write I Am Jack. It has become an Australian best-seller and has been translated into other languages including Vietnamese, Bahasa and Korean. It is published in the US by Tricycle, an imprint of Kane Miller USA. I am Jack has been adapted into a Monkey Baa Theatre Company play by Sandra Eldridge, Eva Di Cesare & Tim McGarry which toured nationally in Australia since 2008 and toured the USA in 2014.

==== Youth disability ====
Gervay researched burns extensively working with the Children's Hospital at Westmead to write Butterflies a young adult novel that was awarded Outstanding Youth Literature on Disability by the International Board on Books for Young People (IBBY). Gervay addressed the World Burn Conference in New York in August 2009 on Butterflies.

== Works ==
- I Am Jack
- Super Jack
- Always Jack
- Being Jack
- Jamie's A Hero
- Victoria's a Star
- Shadows of Olive Trees
- Next Stop the Moon
- Butterflies
- The Cave
- That's Why I Wrote This Song
- Daisy Sunshine
- Gracie and Josh
- Ships in the Field
- Elephants Have Wings
- Heroes of the Secret Underground

== Awards ==
- 2022: Winner, Crystal Kite Award for Heroes of the Secret Underground
- 2022: School Library Association of New South Wales Maurice Saxby Award
- 2027: Nominated for the Astrid Lindgren Memorial Award in the author category

== Bibliography ==
- National Safe Schools Framework The Alannah and Madeline Foundation
- Life Education Australia Healthstar Information
- Somerset Celebration of Literature Festival 2009
- Beijing Literature Festival 2009
- Byron Bay Writers Festival 2008
