= Ken Searle =

Australian artist (born 1951)

Ken Searle (born 1951) is an Australian artist.

Searly was born in Sydney in 1951 and grew up around Cooks River in the south-western suburbs of the city.

He is a self-taught artist who began exhibiting his paintings and drawings in the mid-1970s and has held at least 24 solo exhibitions since. He is known for large, and often whimsical, paintings, in oil on canvas, of suburban and industrial areas in several Australian cities.

From 1998 to 2001 Searle worked as a consultant at the school in the Aboriginal community of Papunya in central Australia, the place where the Western Desert Art Movement originated. During his time there he produced many works depicting the local landscape.

Searle has also collaborated with writer Nadia Wheatley on the production of two books, Papunya School Book of Country and History, and Going Bush.
