= Alyssa Brugman =

Australian author

- Born: 1 May 1974 (age 52); Rathmines, Lake Macquarie, New South Wales, Australia
- Education: University of Newcastle (BBA, 1996)
- Occupation: Author
- Writing career
- Years active: 2000–present
- Genres: Young adult fiction, children's fiction
- Notable works: Finding Grace (2002); Walking Naked (2002); Being Bindy (2004); Alex as Well (2013)
- Notable awards: Western Australian Premier's Book Award (2014)

Alyssa Brugman (born 1 May 1974) is an Australian author of fiction for young adults.

== Early life and education ==
Alyssa Brugman was born 1 May 1974 in Lake Macquarie, to Diederick and Lynette (née Russell) Brugman. She received a Bachelor of Business Administration from the University of Newcastle in 1996.

== Career ==
Brugman has worked as an after-school tutor for Aboriginal children. She taught management, accounting and marketing at a business college, worked for a home improvements company and then worked in Public Relations before becoming a full-time writer.

She submitted her first text, Finding Grace, to The Australian/Vogel Literary Award in 1998. While the novel did not receive an award, it was considered for publication. The novel was ultimately published in 2002. That year, it was shortlisted for the New South Wales Premier's Literary Awards (Ethel Turner Prize), Queensland Premier's Literary Awards, CBCA Book of the Year (Older Readers), Sanderson Young Adult Audio Book of the Year, and the Best Designed Young Adult Book APA Design Awards. It was a 'Commended Book' in the Victorian Premier's Literary Awards 2002 and has been translated into Dutch (for which it has been short listed for the 'Gouden Zoen' Award), Danish, German, and Belgian. The US edition was shortlisted for the Michael Printz Award in 2005.

Walking Naked, Alyssa's second novel was released in August 2002. It won the IBBY Australia Ena Noël Award for Encouragement, it was shortlisted for the Victorian Premier's Literary Award, awarded 'Honour Book' in the 2003 CBCA Book of the Year (Older Readers) and is distributed in the US (where it was listed a Voices of Youth Advocates "Top Shelf Fiction" book 2004), the UK, Germany, Turkey and Portugal.

Brugman's third novel for young adults, Being Bindy was released in 2004. It was a CBCA 'Notable Book', and shortlisted for the Children's Peace Literature Award in 2005, and is also available in Swedish and Norwegian.

Brugman has released a series of pony books: For Sale or Swap, Beginner's Luck, Hot Potato, Hide & Seek, and a fifth installment, Greener Pastures. For Sale or Swap was shortlisted for the Kids Own Australian Literature Award 2006, The Young Australian Best Book Awards 2006 and the Children's Choice Book Awards, 2006, and is one of the books select for the 'Books Alive' Campaign in 2007. These books are also sold in Germany.

Solo, her eighth novel, was released in July 2007. It was a CBCA 'Notable Book' in the Older Readers Category in 2008.

The Equen Queen was released in 2008, and is Alyssa's first foray into the children's Fantasy genre. It is the second novel in the Quentaris series published by Ford Street.

Girl Next Door, Alyssa's eleventh novel, was released in February 2009.

Alex as Well was released in January 2013, and is Alyssa's first book released with Text Publishing. The following year, it won the Western Australian Premier's Book Award for Young Adult, and was shortlisted for the Adelaide Festival Award for Young Adult for Literature. It was also included on the 2014 White Ravens list. Alex as Well was also published in the UK (2014), US (2015) and Italy (2013).

== Personal life ==
Brugman writes full-time and lives in the Hunter Region with her partner, children and various quadrupeds and poultry. She is currently pursuing postgraduate studies at the University of Canberra.

== Publications ==
- Finding Grace (Allen & Unwin, 2002)
- Walking Naked (Allen & Unwin, 2002)
- Being Bindy (Allen & Unwin, 2004)
- For Sale or Swap (Random House, 2005)
- Beginner's Luck (Random House, 2005)
- Hot Potato (Random House, 2006)
- Hide & Seek (Random House, 2005)
- Solo (Allen & Unwin, 2007)
- Greener Pastures (Random House, 2008)
- The Equen Queen (Ford Street, 2008)
- Girl Next Door (Random House, 2009)
- Alex As Well (Text Publishing, 2013)
