= Five Times Dizzy =

Children novel by Nadia Wheatley

- Author: Nadia Wheatley
- Language: English
- Genre: Children's literature
- Publisher: Oxford University Press
- Publication date: 1982
- Publication place: Australia

Five Times Dizzy is a children's novel by Australian author Nadia Wheatley It was first published in 1982. In 1986 it became an Australian children's television series.

== Plot summary ==
Five Times Dizzy is about the comedy and drama of a Greek Australian family in a multi-cultural neighbourhood of inner-city Sydney. To help her Greek grandmother feel more at home, Mareka comes up with a brilliant plan to give her a pet goat.

== Television adaptation ==
The mini-series Five Times Dizzy first screened on the Nine Network in 1986. The series was filmed on location in the inner-city suburb of Newtown and is notable for an acting role by Mary Kostakidis, who went on to become a longtime newsreader on SBS. It was also where John Doyle and Greig Pickhaver first met, the pair going on to establish their longstanding Roy & HG partnership.

=== Cast ===
- Rebekah Elmaloglou as Mareka Nikakis
- Mary Kostakidis as Roula Nikakis
- Stavros Economidis as Georgio Nikakis
- Dominic Elmaloglou as Costa
- Helen Kambos as Yaya (Grandma)
- Jane Clifton as Mrs Wilson
- Jim Holt as Brian Brooking
- Joanne Samuel as Chris Booking
- Ray Meagher
- Joseph and Matthew Homshaw as the Gallaghers
- John Doyle
- Greig Pickhaver

== Awards and nominations ==
- New South Wales Premier's Literary Awards Special Children's Book Award (1983)
- Highly Commended - CBCA Children's Book of the Year Award: Older Readers (1983)
- Honorary Diploma - International Board on Books for Young People (1983)
- AWGIE Awards for Best Adaptation, Children's Television Drama (for the television mini-series) (1987)

== See also ==
- List of Australian television series
