= Dromkeen Medal =

Literary prize in Australia

- Awarded for: outstanding achievement in the advancement of Australian children's and young adult literature
- Country: Australia
- Presented by: State Library of Victoria since 2013
- First award: 1982; 44 years ago
- Website: SLV - Dromkeen Medal

The Dromkeen Medal is a literary prize awarded annually by the Courtney Oldmeadow Children's Literature Foundation for those who have advanced children's literature in Australia. The Medal was established by bookseller, Joyce Oldmeadow in 1982, and is named after the property, Dromkeen Homestead, near Riddell's Creek, Victoria, which the Oldmeadow family purchased in 1973, and established as a children's literature museum.

The State Library of Victoria has presented the Dromkeen Medal since 2013.

== List of medal winners ==
=== 1980s ===
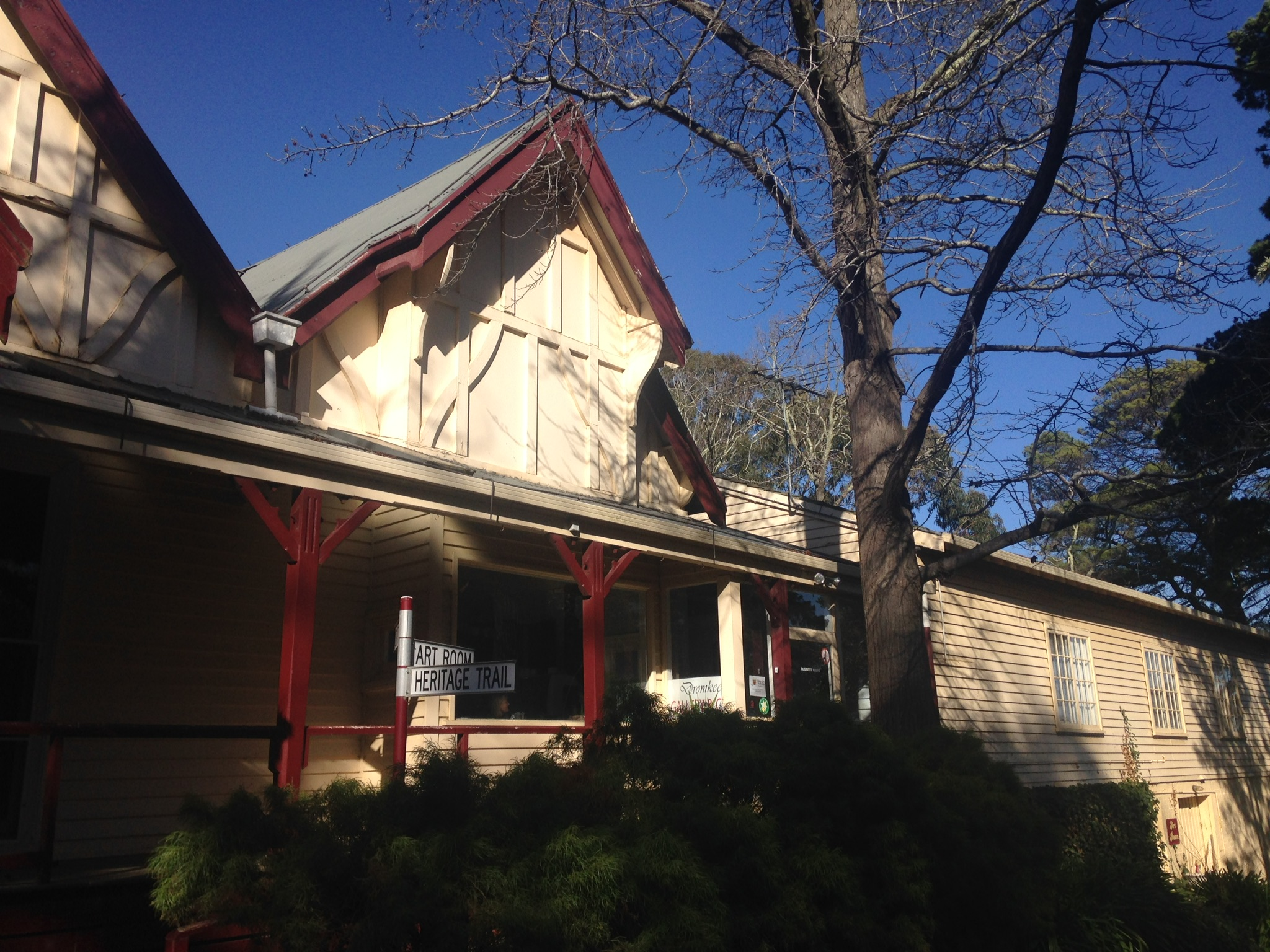
- Entrance to Dromkeen Gallery, near Riddell's Creek Victoria
  1982 Lu Rees AM MBE
- 1983 Maurice Saxby AM
- 1984 Patricia Wrightson OBE
- 1985 Anne Bower Ingram OAM
- 1986 Albert Ullin OAM
- 1987 Joan Phipson AM
- 1988 Patricia Scott AM
- 1989 Robert Ingpen AM

=== 1990s ===
- 1990 Mem Fox AM
- 1991 Robin Klein
- 1992 Julie Vivas
- 1993 Alf Mappin
- 1994 Agnes Nieuwenhuizen
- 1995 Jennifer Rowe AC
- 1996 Belle Alderman AM
- 1997 Colin Thiele AC
- 1998 Graeme Base
- 1999 Barbara Ker Wilson AM

=== 2000s ===
- 2000 Paul Jennings AM
- 2001 Julie Watts
- 2002 Ann James
- 2003 Ivan Southall AM
- 2004 Margaret Dawn Hamilton AM
- 2005 Roland Harvey
- 2006 Walter McVitty AM
- 2007 Patricia Edgar AM
- 2008 Ruth Park AM
- 2009 Bronwyn Bancroft

=== 2010s ===
- 2010 Shaun Tan
- 2011 Libby Gleeson AM
- 2012 Patricia Mullins
- 2014 Helen Chamberlin
- 2015 Andy Griffiths
- 2016 Alison Lester AM
- 2017 Erica Wagner
- 2018 John Marsden

== Dromkeen Librarian's Award ==
In 1994 an annual award was created to recognise someone working in an Australian library setting "in recognition of the important role they play in introducing young people to literature and encouraging an enjoyment and love of reading."

=== 1990s ===
- 1994 Suzette Boyd
- 1995 Debra Rosenfeldt
- 1996 Bronwen Bennett
- 1997 Jill McCallum
- 1998 Juliana Bayfield
- 1999 Miranda Harrowell

=== 2000s ===
- 2000 Suzanne Thwaites
- 2001 Rita Fellows
- 2002 Jenny Stubbs
- 2003 Barbara Braxton
- 2004 Margaret Catterrall
- 2005 Margy Heuschele
- 2006 Jennifer Grant
- 2007 Jennifer Katauskas
- 2008 Ruth Jones
- 2009 Pam Macintyre

=== 2010s ===
- 2010 Suzy Wilson
- 2011 Heather Heraud
- 2012 Libby Ahern
- 2014 Pam Saunders
- 2015 Rosario Martinez
- 2016 Sarah Steed
- 2017 Megan Daley, Junior School Teacher Librarian at St Aidan's Anglican Girls' School, Corinda, Queensland
- 2018 Sue Wootton, Children's Support Officer at Eastern Regional Libraries (ERL)

== See also ==
- List of Australian children's literary awards
