= Jean Chapman (Australian writer) =

Australian children's author (1926–2012)

- Born: Jean Lycett; 15 February 1926 Sydney, New South Wales, Australia
- Died: 26 June 2012 (aged 86) Sydney, New South Wales, Australia
- Occupation: Writer of children's fiction and nonfiction, scriptwriter for educational radio and television broadcasts

Jean Erica Sherlock Chapman (15 February 1926 – 26 June 2012) was an Australian writer. Her works for children included picture books, short stories, poetry and novels as well as radio and television scripts.

Chapman was employed by the Australian Broadcasting Commission as a freelance scriptwriter from 1957, including on radio programs such as Kindergarten of the Air.

== Awards and recognition ==
The Wish Cat was awarded the 1969 Austrian State Award for Children's Literature. The Sugar-Plum Christmas Book was joint winner of the Australia Council's 1978 Visual Arts Board Award.

Chapman won the 1990 Lady Cutler Award which recognises "distinguished service to children's literature".

== Selected works ==
- Amelia Muddle, illustrated by Adye Adams, 1963
- The Wish Cat, drawings by Noela Young and photographs by Dean Hay, 1966
- Tell Me a Tale: Stories, songs and things to do, illustrated by Deborah and Kilmeny Niland, music by Margaret Moore, 1974
- The Sugar-Plum Christmas Book: A book for Christmas and all the days of the year, 1977
- Velvet Paws and Whiskers, illustrated by Deborah Niland, music by Margaret Moore, 1979
- Pancakes and Painted Eggs: A book for Easter and all the days of the year, illustrated by Kilmeny Niland, music by Margaret Moore, 1981

== Later life and death ==
Chapman died in a Sydney nursing home on 26 June 2012, having earlier suffered a stroke.
