= Erica Wagner (artist) =

Australian artist, editor and publisher (born 1967)

- Born: 1963 (age 62–63)
- Occupations: artist, editor, publisher
- Awards: Dromkeen Medal
- Website: Erica Wagner

Erica Wagner (born 1963) is an Australian artist, editor and publisher. She is a painter and collage artist who illustrates, edits and publishes children's literature. She also makes contemporary art. Wagner has been awarded Australian children's literature prizes as well as contemporary art prizes and has been exhibited in solo and group exhibitions. She is co-director of graphic novel publisher Twelve Panels Press.

== Exhibitions ==
=== Solo exhibitions ===
- 2018 Little Wings, No Vacancy Federation Square, Melbourne
- 2016 Sanctuary, No Vacancy Federation Square, Melbourne
- 2012 Retreat, Decoy Cafe, Melbourne
- 2011 Dark Horse, Cambridge Studio Gallery, Collingwood

== Awards ==
- 2024 Winner: Environment Award for Children's Literature – Picture Fiction
- 2024 Winner: Children's Book Council of Australia, Best New Illustrator
- 2020 Winner: Australian Book Industry Awards' Pixie O’Harris award for outstanding commitment to children's literature
- 2017 Highly Commended: Victorian Artists Society Spring Exhibition (Tarra River, Waiting for the Platypus)
- 2017 VAS George Hicks Foundation Contemporary Art Prize
- 2017 Dromkeen Medal
- 2016 Highly Commended: Victorian Artists Society Winter Exhibition (Hattah Lakes)
- 2014 Camberwell Art Show: Deans Encouragement Award, Acrylic Prize (Lagoon)
- 2013 Highly Commended: St Kevin's College Art Show (Walk on By)
- 2012 Highly Commended: St Kevin's College Art Show (Mt Sonder)
- 2011 Winner: Contemporary Art Society of Victoria Annual Exhibition (Telling You the Story of My Life)
- 2011 Highly Commended: Contemporary Art Society of Victoria Annual Exhibition (Fay, One Autumn Day)
- 2011 Highly Commended: Victorian Artists Society Winter Exhibition (Mermaid Nude)
- 2009 Winner: Best Abstract/Contemporary, Pastel Society of Victoria (Angel)
- 2005 Winner: Best Non Traditional/Other, Pastel Society of Victoria (Moving Figure, Dance)
- 2005 Winner: Victorian Artists Society Winter Exhibition (Moving Figure, Battleground)
