= Melbourne Zoo Carousel =

Restored Victorian era carousel in Melbourne Zoo, Victoria, Australia

Coordinates: 37°47′04″S 144°57′10″E

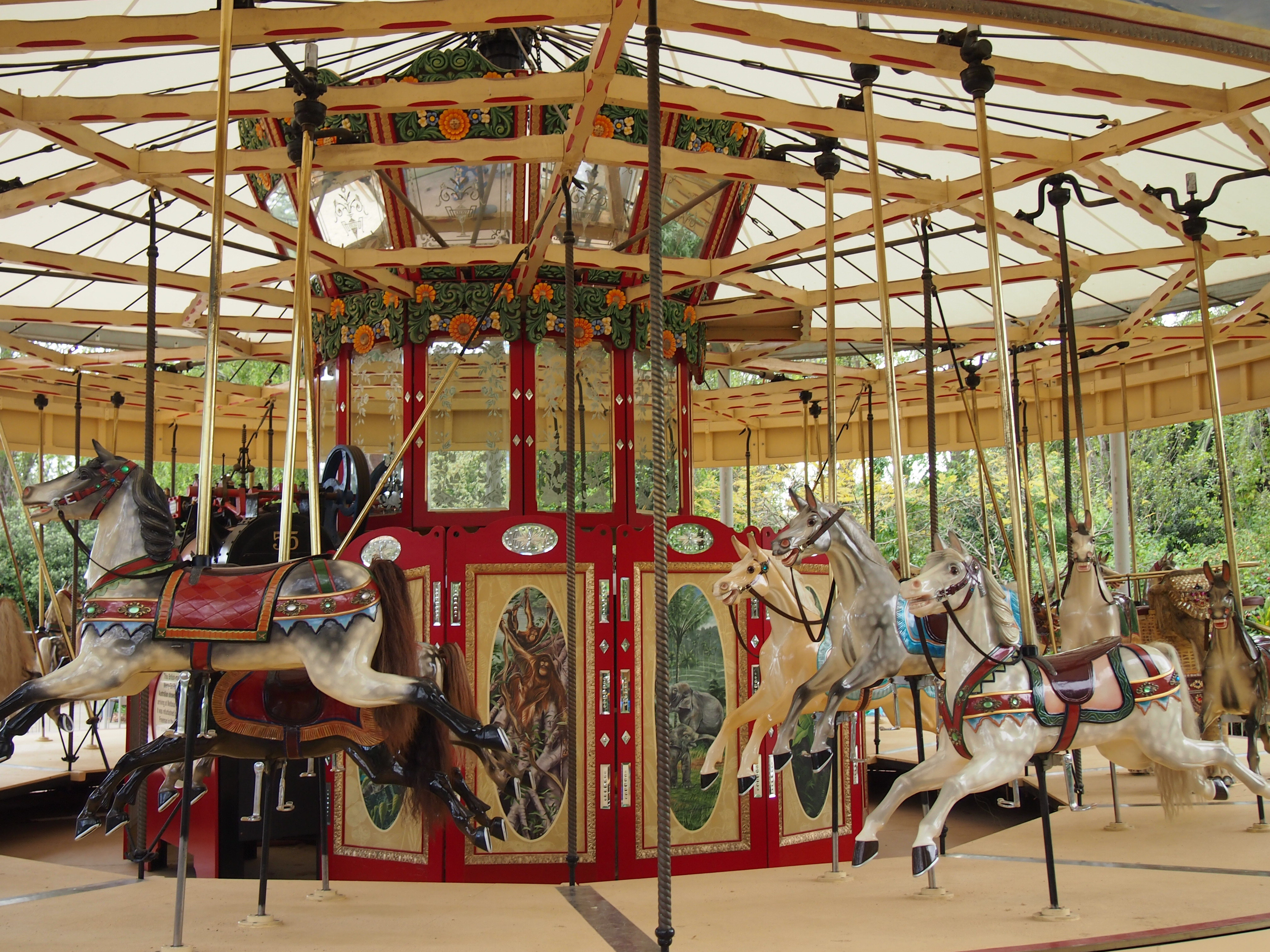
- Melbourne Zoo Carousel in 2012

Melbourne, Victoria, Australia
- Status: Operating
- Opening date: 1952

Ride statistics
- Attraction type: Carousel
- Manufacturer: Robert Tidman & Sons
- Originally manufactured: 1878
- Website: www.zoo.org.au/Melbourne

The Melbourne Zoo Carousel is a restored Victorian era carousel (or merry-go-round) in Melbourne Zoo, Victoria, Australia. The carousel was manufactured in England in 1878 and then brought to Australia in 1886 by a family that ran a touring carnival, visiting country towns in Victoria. After touring with the carnival for over 60 years, in 1952 the carousel became part of a fun fair at the Melbourne Zoo, but was still owned by the same families. When the fun fair at the zoo was permanently closed in 1997, the carousel was purchased by the zoo. By that time, the carousel was in a deteriorated condition. It was restored off-site in 2004-2005 with funding from Heritage Victoria and re-opened in August 2005. The carousel is listed by Heritage Victoria as a heritage place.

== History ==
The carousel was manufactured by Robert Tidman and Sons of Norwich, England in 1878. In that year, Robert and Frederick Tidman were granted a patent for the design of a carousel driven using bevel and spur gears, and powered by a small steam engine.

The carousel was brought to Australia by John and Margaret Briggs in 1886. The Briggs and Freeman families operated the carousel in a touring carnival, visiting country towns in Victoria for over 60 years. In 1952, the carousel was established in a permanent home as part of a fun fair at Melbourne Zoo in Parkville. The carousel was installed in a former giraffe enclosure and was operated by Briggs and Freeman Entertainments.

In February 1996, the carousel was listed by Heritage Victoria as a heritage place with VHR number 4738.

By the late 1990s the carousel was in a deteriorated condition, but remained as part of the fun fair until 1997, when the fair was closed. Melbourne Zoo purchased the carousel because of its historic connection with the zoo, but the rest of the fun fair was sold off.

== Restoration ==
By 2004, a project to restore the carousel was underway, with funding from Heritage Victoria. The main mechanical restoration work was carried out in Castlemaine, but an artist Patricia Mullins undertook the repainting of the carousel horses in a studio in Fitzroy. The restoration included new paintings and surrounds for the rounding boards. Following completion of the restoration, the carousel was re-opened on 7 August 2005, after being off-site for six years. Dorrie Freeman from the original owner's family was present at the re-opening.

== Description ==
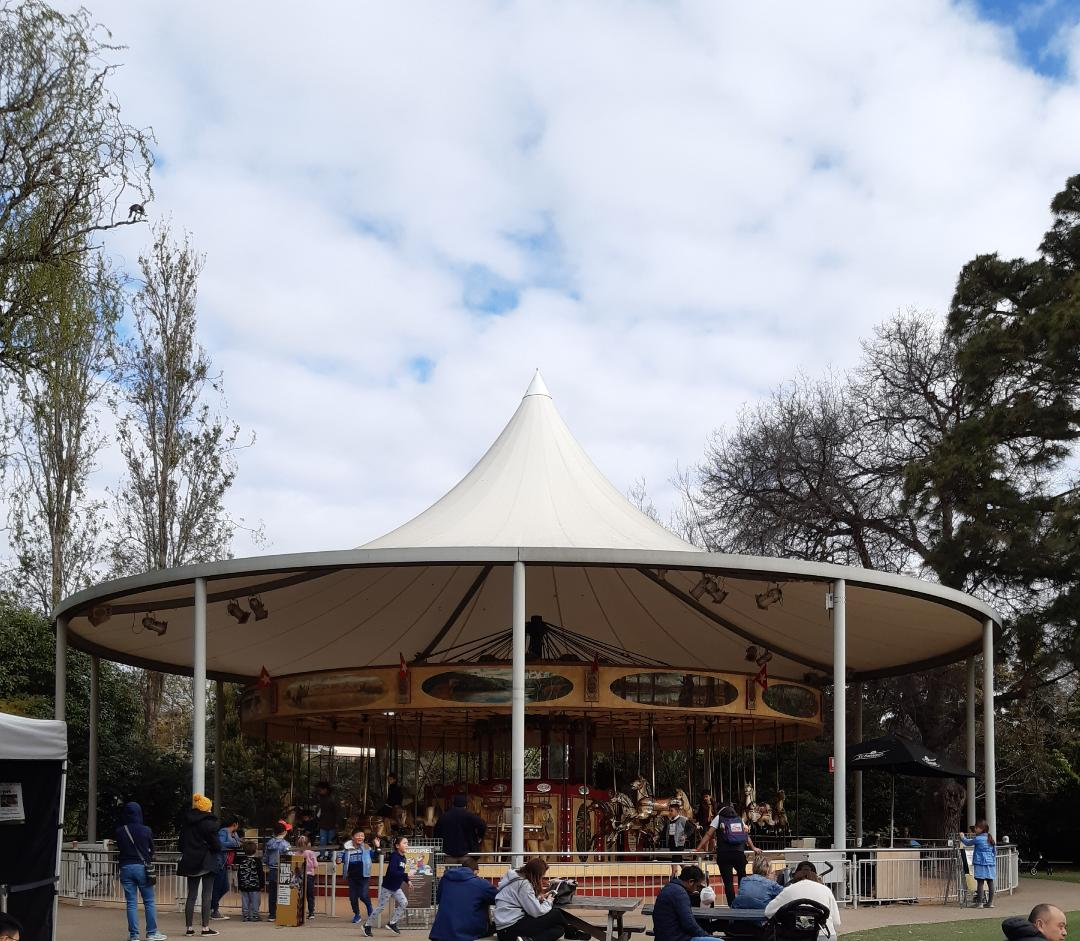
Melbourne Zoo Carousel with housing

The carousel rotates clock-wise, typical of English-made carousels. It has a three abreast configuration of 30 carved horses, along with two replica fibreglass elephants. The original horses were made by G & J Lines, London, and 20 of these remain. The 10 outside row horses were replaced in the 1970s with German-made horses, also from the late 19th century. The centre panels of the carousel feature etched glass mirrors, with carved floral decorations above.

The carousel was originally powered by a Tidman centre-mounted steam engine. The Tidman engine was refurbished during the restoration and remains in place, but is not operational.

A custom-made modern enclosure with transparent plastic curtains protects the carousel from the weather.
