= Julie Watts =

Australian author and publisher

Julie Watts OAM
- Born: 1950 (age 75–76); Guildford, Surrey, England
- Occupations: Author, publisher
- Years active: c. 1970s–present
- Notable work: The Art of Graeme Base
- Awards: Pixie O'Harris Award; Dromkeen Medal (2001); Medal of the Order of Australia (2021)

Julie Watts OAM (born 1950) is an Australian author and publisher. She won the Dromkeen Medal in 2001.

== Early life ==
Watts was born in Guildford, Surrey, England. Her mother worked in a second-hand bookshop after Julie was born.

== Career ==
Watts' first job was secretary to the editor of the Royal Institute of Chemistry. She started at Penguin as secretary in the publishing department. She was later promoted to publisher for books for children and young adults.

Since 2005 Watts has worked as a freelance consultant.

== Books ==
- The Art of Graeme Base (co-authored with Graeme Base)

== Recognition and awards ==
Watts received both the Pixie O'Harris Award for Distinguished and Dedicated Service to the Development and Reputation of Australian Children's Books and, in 2001, the Dromkeen Medal for her contribution to children's literature.

Watts was awarded the Medal of the Order of Australia for "service to literature" in the 2021 Queen's Birthday Honours.

== Other achievements ==
The Victorian Society of Editors made a presentation based on a transcript from three books and a film of Julie Watts. Bruce Beresford directed the film version.

== Note ==
Watts is not to be confused with the poet Julie Watts, from Western Australia, who won the Blake Poetry Prize in 2017 and, in February 2018, the Dorothy Hewett Award for Legacy, an unpublished manuscript of collected poems
