= Lilith Norman =

Australian children's author

- Born: Lilith George Norman; 27 November 1927; Sydney, New South Wales, Australia
- Died: 22 December 2017 (aged 90); Naremburn, New South Wales, Australia
- Occupations: Children's writer, editor
- Writing career
- Years active: 1947–1999
- Genres: Children's fiction, nonfiction
- Notable works: Climb a Lonely Hill; A Dream of Seas; Grandpa
- Notable awards: IBBY Australia Honour for Writing (1980); CBCA Honour Book (1999)

Lilith George Norman (1927–2017) was an Australian children's writer, also known for her editorship of the New South Wales School Magazine.

== Early life and education ==
Norman was born in Sydney, New South Wales on 27 November 1927. Part of her childhood was spent in Goulburn, where she attended Bourke Street Primary School, came second in Class 6A and secured admission to Goulburn High School. Instead she moved to Waverley and was educated at Sydney Girls High School from 1940 to 1944. She won a short story prize in 1943.

== Career ==
Norman found work as an assistant at Newtown Library from 1947 to 1948 and worked as a telephonist at a London hotel 1950–1951. Returning to Sydney she became a sales assistant at Angus & Robertson in 1952–1953. She then nursed at Balmain Hospital for three years before returning to librarianship, being promoted to children's librarian at the Sydney Public Library in 1966.

In 1970 Norman joined the New South Wales School Magazine as assistant editor. She was promoted to editor in 1975 on the resignation of Patricia Wrightson. After three years as editor she resigned in December 1978 to write full time.

Her works for children were noted for their realistic depictions of families facing difficult circumstances. A Dream of Seas, for example, deals with a young boy coping with his father's death and has "elements of magic realism".

== Selected works ==
=== Children's fiction ===
- Norman, Lilith (1970). Climb a lonely hill. Collins. ISBN 978-0-00-184351-6.
- —— (1971). The shape of three. Collins. ISBN 978-0-00-184762-0.
- —— (1973). The flame takers. Collins. ISBN 978-0-00-661224-7.
- —— (1977). Mocking-bird man. Lacis, Astra (illustrator). Hodder and Stoughton. ISBN 978-0-340-22208-9.
- —— (1978). A dream of seas. Bell, Edwina (illustrator). Collins. ISBN 978-0-00-184372-1.
- —— (1979). My simple little brother. Rae, David (illustrator). Collins. ISBN 978-0-00-184391-2.
- Lilith Norman (1993), The paddock: a story in praise of the earth, Roennfeldt, Robert (illustrator), Random House, ISBN 9780091826512
- —— (1998). Grandpa. Young, Noela (illustrator). Margaret Hamiltion Books. ISBN 978-0-947241-52-0.

=== Nonfiction ===
- Norman, Lilith (1983). The brown and yellow : Sydney Girls' High School 1883–1983. Young, Noela (cover designer/illustrator). Oxford University Press. ISBN 978-0-19-554431-2.

== Awards and recognition ==
- Sydney Morning Herald Literary Competition – Poetry, joint third prize, 1947
- Children's Book of the Year Award: Older Readers, commended for Climb a Lonely Hill, 1971
- IBBY Australia Honour for Writing, winner for A Dream of Seas, 1980
- Australian Family Therapists' Award for Children's Literature – Picture Book and Younger Readers, winner for Granpa, 1999
- Children's Book of the Year Award: Picture Book, honour book for Granpa, 1999
