= Ena Noël =

Australian schoolteacher and children's literature advocate

Ena Noël

Phillipena Noël, OAM (July 30, 1910 — December 7, 2003) best known as Ena Noël, was a ballet teacher, teacher librarian and advocate for children's literature and library services to children and young adults. She founded IBBY Australia, the country's chapter of the International Board on Books for Young People, and was president of the organization for over 20 years.

== Early life ==
Noël was born in Sydney, Australia on July 30, 1910 to Russian immigrant parents Annie Krantz and William Roden. From childhood, Noël developed an interest in all forms of art and literature, especially music, theatre and dance. Inspired by the first Bodenwieser Ballet performed in Sydney in 1939, she trained in ballet under Gertrud Bodenwieser. After dancing with the Bodenwieser Group for some years, Noël conducted a dance studio at Rose Bay for about 20 years. In 1952–53 she toured Britain and Europe with a solo lecture-dance program entitled The life cycle of an Australian Aboriginal woman, dancing to John Antill's music for Corroboree. She performed, representing Australia, in the festivities for the Royal coronation in 1953.

In 1940 she married Arthur Charles Noël, a British sea captain. After her husband's death in 1966, although remaining passionate about dance, Noël pursued an academic career. She obtained a Bachelor of Arts and Diploma of Education from the University of Sydney, and started teaching English and History at various high schools. While teaching at Dover Heights Girls High School she became convinced that her highest goal was to turn young people into enthusiastic readers by working in school libraries. In 1958 she was appointed as a librarian at South Sydney Boys High.

== Contribution to children's literature ==
Ena Noël was a member of the Library Association of Australia (LLA) from 1957; the Children's Libraries Section (NSW) from 1959; foundation committee member of the School Libraries Section (NSW) and member, Children's Book Council of Australia (NSW). When Australia became a member of the International Board on Books for Young People in 1966 Ena Noël served as the first President. She was invited to speak at many international conferences and from 1982 to 1986 served on the International Board on Books for Young People international executive committee. Noël was president of the Australian section of the International Board on Books for Young People (IBBY) for over twenty years being affectionately known in Australia as ‘Mrs IBBY’.

She believed literature to be a potent force in international understanding and goodwill. In 1986 she successfully nominated Patricia Wrightson for the IBBY Hans Christian Andersen Medal for the body of her writing for children, and Robert Ingpen for the same award for his illustrations of children's books. This is the only time that both of these awards have gone to the same country in the same year.

She was a respected critic of children's literature and contributed articles to international journals such as Bookbird. In 1971 she organized Australia's only entry for the Biennial of Illustrations in Bratislava. In 1992 she was the Australian judge for the American Ezra Jack Keats Award in children's literature.

For her services to children's literature, Noël received the Children's Book Council's Lady Cutler Award in 1983, and in 1986 she was presented with the Medal of the Order of Australia. On the occasion of the Lady Cutler Award it was said: "In the world of children's literature Ena Noël's name is a password nationally and internationally. It is a password amongst those who believe that literature of quality and integrity is a powerful potential in the growth of children's imagination, insight and understanding – understanding of themselves, their society and their world; that books can be bridges linking person to person, culture to culture, nation to nation."

Noël nominated Maurice Saxby to the international jury of the Hans Christian Andersen Award in 1984 and 1986, and he was subsequently elected both years.

== Ena Noël Award for Encouragement ==
Ena Noel Award for Encouragement

In 1994, Noël founded the Ena Noël Award for Encouragement for young, emerging Australian writers and illustrators. The award is a mounted silver medallion designed by the first winner of the award, the Australian Aboriginal writer and illustrator Arone Raymond Meeks. The Award is presented biennially by IBBY Australia. A list of the award winners is included in the IBBY Australia entry.

== Contribution to children's librarianship ==
From 1956 to 1974 she was renowned for her skill as a teacher-librarian – especially at Fort St Girls High (now known as Fort Street High School). Noël and Margaret Trask were early leaders in the Library Association of Australia's School and Children's Libraries Section. Noël coordinated and lectured at short summer courses in secondary school librarianship at the University of Sydney in the 1960s.

== Awards ==
- 1983: Children's Book Council of Australia's Lady Cutler Award for services to children's literature
- 1984: the General Council of the Library Association of Australia (now the Australian Library and Information Association) created a special award, the Ellinor Archer Award, which recognized her great contributions to the development of school and children's libraries.
- 1986: Medal of the Order of Australia for "service to libraries, especially in the field of children's literature".
- 2018: A street in the Canberra suburb of Coombs, ACT was named Ena Noel Street.
