= Snugglepot and Cuddlepie =

1918 book by May Gibbs

- First edition
- Author: May Gibbs
- Language: English
- Genre: Children's literature
- Publisher: Angus & Robertson
- Publication date: 1918
- Publication place: Australia
- Media type: Illustrated audiobook
- Website: maygibbs.org

Snugglepot and Cuddlepie is a series of books written by Australian author May Gibbs. The books chronicle the adventures of the eponymous Snugglepot and Cuddlepie. The central story arc concerns Snugglepot and Cuddlepie (who are essentially homunculi) and their adventures along with troubles with the villains of the story, the "Banksia Men". The first book of the series, Tales of Snugglepot and Cuddlepie: their wonderful adventures was published in 1918.

== Description ==
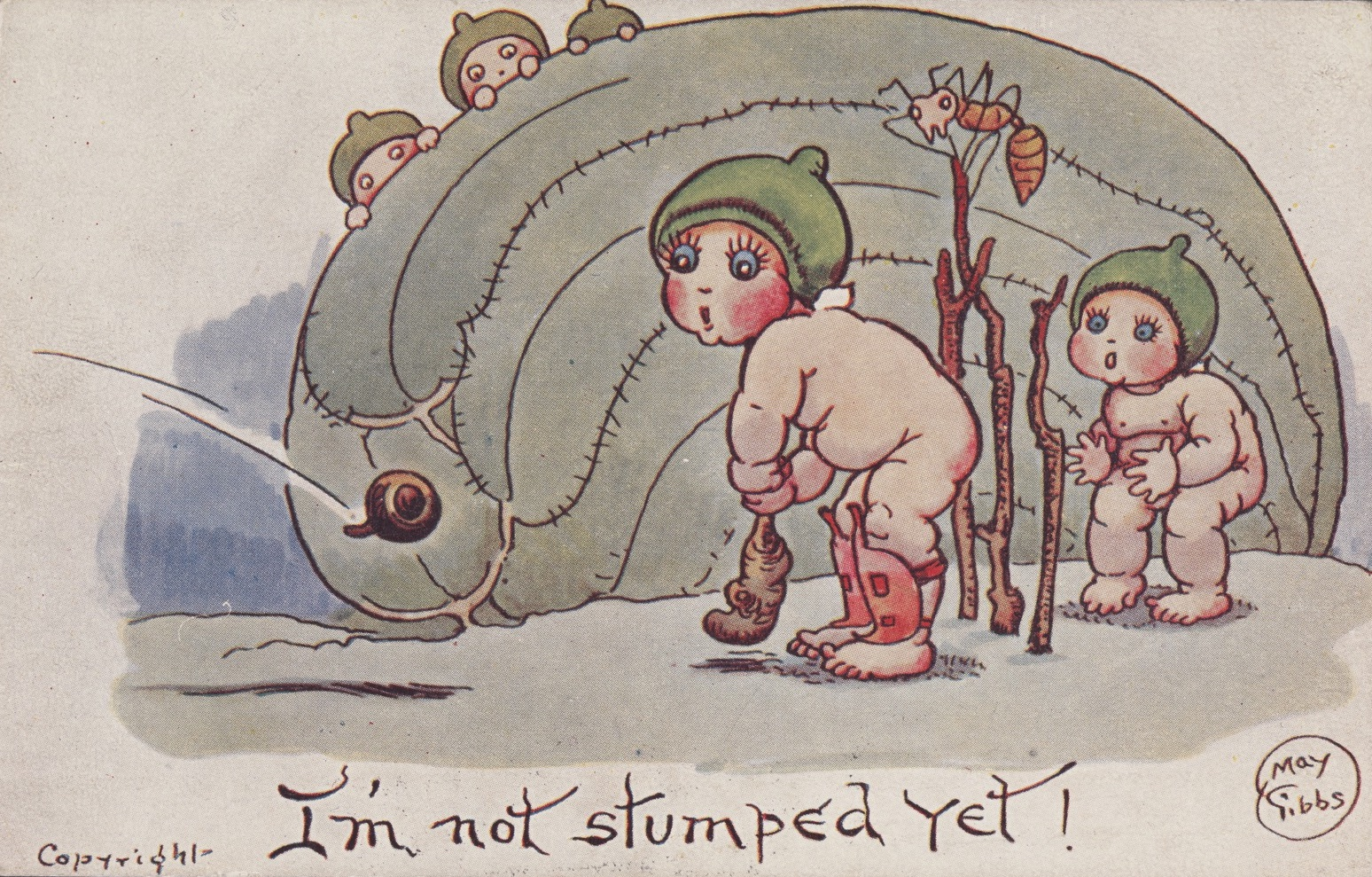
Gumnut babies postcard

Snugglepot and Cuddlepie, the gumnut babies, are the protagonists of the story and are modelled on young eucalyptus (gum tree) nuts. The female gumnut babies, however, have their hair, hats and skirts modelled on eucalyptus flowers.

May Gibbs based some of the characters and scenery on the plants found in the bushland of Harvey, Western Australia, where she played as a child.

A Banksia Man, from May Gibbs' Snugglepot and Cuddlepie

The "big bad" Banksia Men are the villains of the story and are modelled on the appearance of aged Banksia "cones", with follicles for eyes and other facial features.

We came to a grove of Banksia trees and sitting on almost every branch were these ugly little, wicked little men that I discovered and that's how the Banksia Men were thought of.

== Books ==
May Gibbs wrote a number of titles based on her creations. The first publication was in 1918, Tales of Snugglepot and Cuddlepie: their adventures wonderful, and the set of works was first collected in 1940 as, The Complete Adventures of Snugglepot and Cuddlepie, with the cover declaring Including Little Ragged Blossom and Little Obelia.

Others are
Snugglepot and Cuddlepie find Ragged Blossom.
Little Ragged Blossom and more about Snugglepot and Cuddlepie.
Little Obelia and further adventures of ragged Blossom, Snugglepot and Cuddlepie.
Snugglepot and Cuddlepie on Board the Snag/the Original Characters Created By May Gibbs; Redrawn By Noela Young; Adapted By David Harris. (1975)
Snugglepot and Cuddlepie meet Mr Lizard (1970).

== Productions and creative works ==
Richard Mills composed a ballet of the same name in 1987, which was produced for television.

Peter Combe adapted Snugglepot and Cuddlepie into a musical, which was first performed in 1992 at the Adelaide Festival of Arts. It was recorded the following year at the Adelaide Festival Centre with the Adelaide Symphony Orchestra. Ruth Cracknell was a special guest, playing the part of May Gibbs.

The Adventures of Snugglepot & Cuddlepie and Little Ragged Blossom is a musical adapted by John Clarke and Doug MacLeod, with a book by Clarke and music and lyrics by Alan John. It premiered at the Theatre Royal on 9 January 2007. Adult actors played the parts of the gumnut babies – Darren Gilshenan (Cuddlepie), Tim Richards (Snugglepot) and Ursula Yovich (Ragged Blossom). The story centres on the two characters of Snugglepot and Cuddlepie, who befriend a Blossom and search the unknown land of Australia. Unlike Combe's musical, the 2007 version is a political satire.

The spoken word recording Australian classic children's collection includes the story as one of four works of children's literature.

Tibby's Leaf by Ursula Dubosarsky, the story of child who sees gumnut babies in the bush at the outbreak of World War One, was inspired by Gibbs' World War One gumnut baby postcards which are held in the collection of the National Museum of Australia.

== Honours ==
In 1985 a postage stamp honouring the protagonists or their creator was issued by Australia Post as part of a set of five commemorating children's books.

== Northcott and Cerebral Palsy Alliance ==
On 27 November 1969 May Gibbs died. On passing she bequeathed royalties of her Snugglepot and Cuddlepie creations jointly to the Northcott Society and Cerebral Palsy Alliance (formerly known as The Spastic Centre). Since then both charitable organisations have been able to use these royalties to further their respective programmes helping children and adults with disabilities.
