= Patricia Scott (author) =

Australian author and storyteller

- Born: 1926; Oatlands, Tasmania
- Died: July 2012 (aged 86)
- Occupation: Storyteller

Patricia Scott AM (1926–2012) was an Australian children's author and storyteller.

== Life ==
Scott was one of Australia's first professional storytellers.

Scott died in July 2012 aged 86.

== Awards ==
- 1988 Dromkeen Medal
- 1991 Member of the Order of Australia

== Works ==
- Storytelling & reading aloud OCLC 8346206
- I had a little hen OCLC 27614853
- Pigs everywhere OCLC 27614874
