= Maurice Saxby =

Australian literary critic

Maurice Saxby AM
- Born: Henry Maurice Saxby; 26 December 1924; Botany, New South Wales
- Died: 30 November 2014 (aged 89); Hunters Hill, New South Wales
- Occupations: educator, author, critic reviewer
- Known for: expert in Australian children's literature

Henry Maurice Saxby AM (26 December 1924 – 30 November 2014) was an Australian educator, author, critic, reviewer and authority on Australian children's literature.

== Early life and education ==
Henry Maurice Saxby was born on 26 December 1924 in Botany, New South Wales, His father was Maurice Henry Saxby and his mother was Nettie Thompson. They had three sons, Henry Maurice, Geoffrey, Richard; and a daughter, Helen.

Saxby attended and won awards at Leeton High School and completed his Leaving Certificate in 1941 at Fort Street Boys' High School, later studying at the Metropolitan Business College.

== Career ==
=== Military service ===
Saxby served in the Australian Imperial Forces from 1943 to 1946, including as an army medic in the 4th Field Ambulance in Madang, Papua New Guinea during World War II and was discharged with the rank of Sergeant after the war.

=== Teaching ===
Saxby trained as a teacher at Balmain Teachers College from 1948 to 1949. He spent five years teaching in infants, primary, and high schools in New South Wales, including setting up a library in North Sydney School, appointment to Forest Lodge Demonstration School as a teacher-librarian, and Picton High School teaching English. He was associated with the NSW School Library Service, working with Joyce Fardell.

Saxby completed his Masters of Education at the University of Sydney before lecturing in the Bachelor of Education course.

He was appointed as a lecturer in English at Newcastle Teachers College, lectured at Alexander Mackie College and continued to lecture at various colleges and universities in Australia and overseas. He moved to Kuring-gai College of Advanced Education where he lectured in English, librarianship and children's literature until his retirement as head teacher of Eeucation.

== Children's literature ==
Maurice Saxby is considered, by those involved with Australian children's literature, as the foremost commentator on, and critic of, the field.

— ~ John Foster, 1998

Saxby was recognised internationally as an authority on children's literature and on Australian children's writing in particular. He was affectionately referred to as "the Godfather of Australian Children's Literature." His masters thesis on the history of Australian children's literature was later published as "A history of Australian children's literature 1841 to 1941". He continued researching and surveying the history of Australian children's literature in a second volume which he completed as a PhD thesis at the University of Technology Sydney and published as "Images of Australia 1940 to 1970" and a third volume "The Proof of the Puddin'".

Maurice turned me not just into a children's writer, but with his kindness and insight, made me the one I am now. So much of the strength and diversity of Australian children's literature is due to him...But his true legacy will last as long as stories are told to young people in Australia.

— ~ Jackie French, 2015

Saxby reviewed Australian children's books for a range of publications including Magpies, Reading Time, Viewpoint, Literature Base and Orana.

=== Children's Book Council of Australia ===
Saxby was the first national president of the Children's Book Council of Australia in 1958, served as a judge for the CBCA book of the year awards. He became a trustee of the NSW Branch. He remained associated with the CBCA for more than 60 years, and was granted life membership in recognition of his achievements, as well as receiving a CBCA Citation in 1991.

=== International Board on Books for Young People ===
Saxby served twice on the international jury for the Hans Christian Andersen Awards. He was nominated by Ena Noël, and elected to the jury in 1984 and 1986. In his second term the two Hans Christian Andersen medals were presented to Australians the first time both awards had ever gone to the same country. The 1986 Awards were presented at the IBBY Congress in Tokyo. The award for writing was presented to Patricia Wrightson and the award for illustration was presented to Robert Ingpen. In recognition of his achievements he was made a life member of the IBBY Australia organisation.

=== NSW Premier's Literary Awards ===
Saxby also served as judge for the NSW Premier's Literary Awards.

== Works ==
Surveying the history of children's literature in Australia

- Offered to children : a history of Australian children's literature 1841–1941, Scholastic Australia, 1998, ISBN 978-1-86388-638-3
- Give them wings : the experience of children's literature, Macmillan, 1987, ISBN 978-0-333-43041-5
- The proof of the puddin' : Australian children's literature 1970–1990, Sydney New York Ashton Scholastic, 1993, ISBN 978-0-86896-604-5
- Images of Australia : a history of Australian children's literature 1941–1970, Scholastic Australia, 2002, ISBN 978-1-86504-456-9

Children's literature

- Books in the life of a child : bridges to literature and learning, South Melbourne Macmillan Education Australia, 1997, ISBN 978-0-7329-4519-0
- Saxby, H. M. (Henry Maurice); Smith, Glenys, 1928– (1991), First choice, a guide to the best books for Australian children, Oxford University Press, ISBN 978-0-19-553130-5
- Cooper, Pamela J; Collins, Rives; Saxby, H. M. (Henry Maurice), 1924–; Cooper, Pamela J. (1994), The power of story, Macmillan Education Australia, ISBN 978-0-7329-2798-1
- Saxby, H. M. (Henry Maurice) (1977), Children and literature, University of Sydney, Dept. of Adult Education

Teaching reading

- Saxby, H. M. (Henry Maurice); Turney, C. (Clifford), 1932–, (joint ed.) (1974), Teaching the new English in primary schools : maintaining continuity and implementing change in the language arts, Ian Novak
- When Johnny and Judy don't read, Primary English Teaching Association of N.S.W, 1978, ISBN 978-0-909955-33-5

Anthologies

- Saxby, H. M. (Henry Maurice); Ingpen, Robert, 1936– (1989), The great deeds of superheroes, Millennium, ISBN 978-0-85574-884-5
- Saxby, H. M. (Henry Maurice); Ingpen, Robert, 1936– (1990), The great deeds of heroic women, Millennium Books, ISBN 978-0-85574-983-5
- Saxby, H. M. (Henry Maurice); Winch, John, 1944–2007 (1997), The Millennium book of myth & story, Millennium Books, ISBN 978-1-86429-041-7
- Saxby, H. M. (Henry Maurice), 1924–; Glusac, Randy, 1953– (1989), The All over Australia joke book, Puffin Books, ISBN 978-0-14-034104-1
- Saxby, H. M. (Henry Maurice), 1924–; Glusac, Randy, 1953– (1989), The All over Australia riddle book, Puffin Books, ISBN 978-0-14-034250-5

Picturebooks

- Saxby, H. M. (Henry Maurice); Lacis, Astra, (illustrator.) (1990), Russell and the star shell, Hunters Hill, N.S.W. Margaret Hamilton, ISBN 978-0-947241-20-9
- Saxby, H. M. (Henry Maurice); Gross, Julie, (illustrator.) (1999), The devil's trousers : a folktale from Bologna, Milson's Point, N.S.W. Random House, ISBN 978-0-09-183164-6

== Awards and honours ==
- 1983 Dromkeen Medal
- 1986 Rotary International Award for vocational excellence
- 1989 Lady Cutler Award (CBCA NSW)
- 1991 Children's Book Council of Australia National Council Citation
- 1991 Australian School Library Association Citation
- 1995 Appointed Member of the Order of Australia (AM)
- 2002 Nan Chauncy Award for contributions to Australian Children's Literature
- 2005 Primary English Teachers Association Australia Life Member
- 2013 Pixie O'Harris Award for distinguished service to children's books at the Australian Book Industry Awards
- 2013 Doctor of Letters (honoris causa), University of Sydney

== Personal life ==
Saxby married Joyce Boniwell, who was the first children's editor at Angus & Robertson book publisher in 1963. Joyce died of cancer in 1964. He married Norma Jean Bateson on 14 December 1972. Norma died of cancer in 1990.

Saxby died on 30 November 2014 in Hunters Hill, New South Wales. A memorial service was arranged on Monday 19 January 2015 in the Great Hall at Sydney University. A memory book with contributions by children's authors, illustrators, publishers as well as friends and former students was compiled.

== Memorials ==
- The Maurice Saxby Award, presented by the School Library Association of New South Wales, honours an individual, team or organisation that has displayed excellence and passion in promoting reading and/or writing for young people in New South Wales.
- The Maurice Saxby Lecture, presented by the Children's Book Council of Australia, acknowledges the contribution made to the CBCA by Saxby.
