= Joyce Fardell =

Australian teacher librarian

- Born: 31 March 1923; Portland, New South Wales
- Died: 15 July 2007 (aged 84)
- Occupation: Teacher librarian
- Known for: Advocate for children's literature

Joyce Fardell (1923–2007) was an Australian teacher librarian and advocate for children's literature. She was instrumental in establishing teacher librarian roles in New South Wales Schools, establishing the principle of teacher-librarians being qualified both as teachers and as librarians.

== Early life ==
Joyce Gladys Fardell was born in Portland, New South Wales on 31 March 1923. She attended Portland Intermediate High School and won a bursary to further her high school education. Joyce attended Sydney University 1940-1943 and did her practice teaching at Sydney Girls High School in 1943.

== Career ==
Joyce began her career as a teacher, then teacher librarian, at Portland Intermediate High School in 1944. She then became teacher librarian at Penrith High School from 1951 to 1955.

Joyce was invited to join the NSW School Library Service in 1956, by the "founding" officer-in-charge, Elizabeth Hill. There she worked with Ailsa Hows and Maurice Saxby. In 1959, Joyce became the officer-in-charge.

With Director of Studies John Vaughan and Inspector of Schools Phil Brownlee, Joyce co-authored the Report on School Libraries in 1969 which highlighted the need for libraries in New South Wales schools and training for teacher librarians. Joyce established a ten-day training course for teacher librarians. School Library Services was renamed Library Services in 1973, with Joyce as Head. In 1975 when the first full year course was established for teacher librarians, she lobbied for the Education Department to fund the attendance of teachers. Under Joyce's guidance, NSW School Library Service/Library Services provided advice and guidance to all school teacher librarians, and school and departmental administrators and decision makers. These included publication of the Children's Book List., Literature and the Reading Programme ., and the Central cataloguing bulletin, the precursor to SCAN.

Joyce was a foundation member of the Children's Libraries Section of the Library Association of Australia when the group was established in NSW in 1953. She was active in the Children's Book Council of Australia and a noted authority on children's literature.

In 1970 Joyce coordinated a conference on school libraries as part of the World Confederation of Organisations of the Teaching Profession forum which was held in Sydney. influencing the movement to establish the International Association of School Librarianship which was formed the following year. Joyce retired from New South Wales Department of Education, Division of Services, Library Services in 1979.

== Works ==
- Fardell, Joyce (1978), "Are we playing games with words again?", The Primary Journal (1): 26–29, ISSN 0311-1342
- Fardell, Joyce (August 1988). "Elizabeth Hill and the NSW School Library Service". Orana. 24 (3): 139–147.
- Fardell, Joyce (August 1980), "Humour in children's fiction", Orana, 16: 82–92, ISSN 0045-6705
- Fardell, Joyce (1995), "Memories", Reading Time: The Journal of the Children's Book Council of Australia, 40 (1): 5–6
- Fardell, Joyce (1969), "School libraries - A call for leadership", The Leader. NSW Department of Education, 4 (4): 32–34
- Fardell, J; Kinsella, Phil; Bolte, P (1978), A statement of policy in regard to school libraries, Division of Services, NSW Dept. of Education
- Vaughan, W; Fardell, J; Brownlee, Phil (1969), Report of the Committee appointed to examine the operation of School Libraries and the School Library Service in New South Wales, NSW Dept. of Education

== Awards ==
- 1982 – Lady Cutler Award from the Children's Book Council of Australia for distinguished services to children's literature in New South Wales

== Personal life ==
In 2007 Joyce established the Ruth Marion Fardell Bursary at the University of Sydney for students in wheelchairs, in memory of her mother.

Joyce died on 15 July 2007 in Ashfield, New South Wales. She was 84 years old.
