= Robyn Sheahan-Bright =

Australian author, editor and publisher

- Education: Griffith University
- Occupations: Author, Editor, Publisher
- Known for: Children's Literature

Robyn Marie Sheahan-Bright AM is an Australian author, editor and publisher of, and on, children's literature and publishing itself.

== Career ==
Based in Queensland Sheahan-Bright co-founded Jam Roll Press with Leonie Tyler and Robyn Collins in 1988 to publish children's picture books and young adult fiction. It was later sold to University of Queensland Press in 1994. Sheahan-Bright was the inaugural executive director of the Queensland Writers Centre (1991–1997).

Sheahan-Bright received a PhD from Griffith University in 2005 for her thesis, "To Market to Market: The Development of the Australian Children's Publishing Industry".

Sheahan-Bright chaired the judging panel Children's Fiction and Young Adult Fiction for the 2010 and 2011 Prime Minister's Literary Awards.

Since 2017 she has been a board member of the Australian Children's Literature Alliance (founded in 2008) which selects and appoints an annual Australian Children's Laureate. In 2018 she was elected president of IBBY Australia.

== Awards and recognition ==
- 2011 Dame Annabelle Rankin Award for Distinguished Services to Children's Literature, Qld Branch of Children's Book Council of Australia
- 2012 Nan Chauncy Award for her outstanding contribution to the field of Australian children's literature
- 2014 recipient of the Johnno Award for her contribution to Queensland Writing.
- 2021 Member of the Order of Australia for "significant service to children's literature, and to the promotion of reading"

== Publications ==
- Nightmares in Paradise : A Collection of Short Stories, University of Queensland Press, 1995, ISBN 9780702227059
- Paradise to Paranoia, co-written with Nigel Krauth, University of Queensland Press, 1995, ISBN 9780702227851
- Original Sin, (collection of young adult short stories), compiler/editor, University of Queensland Press, 1996, ISBN 0702228761
- Hot Iron Corrugated Sky: 100 years of Queensland writing, co-edited with Stuart Glover, University of Queensland Press, 2002, ISBN 0702233447
- Paper Empires: A history of the book in Australia 1946–2005, also titled A history of the book in Australia, co-written with Craig Munro, University of Queensland Press, 2006, ISBN 9780702235733
