= Anne Ingram (New Zealand writer) =

New Zealand writer, journalist and festival organiser

- Born: Auckland, New Zealand
- Writing career
- Notable works: Bonjour Lucy Bee, Lucy Bee and the Secret Gene
- Website: www.anneingram.com

Anne Ingram is a New Zealand children's writer of middle fiction for the 8 to 14 age group.

== Biography ==
Ingram was born in Auckland, New Zealand in 1947 but spent most of her childhood growing up in Dunedin, Te Kūiti, and Orewa. She has been co-ordinator of the Kapiti Children's Book Festival and convenor of the Kapiti Schools' Mastermind Competition. Ingram is chair of the Kapiti Children's Writers Charitable Trust and leads a monthly Focus group of local writers. She has lived and worked in Auckland, Wellington, London, Christchurch, Singapore and Hamilton, but has spent the largest time where she lives now, in Waikanae on the Kapiti Coast. She has a B.A. in English (University of Wellington) and a Diploma of teaching (Christchurch College of Education. She has worked as a journalist, teacher, librarian, editor and bookseller, having run her own specialist children's bookstore, Moby Dickens' Books.

== Published works ==
Ingram has published a total of six books and has also worked as a newspaper columnist. Sea Robbers (Mallinson Rendel, 1995), her first published novel is about a New Zealand boy and his Malaysian friend who are taken capture by modern-day pirates off the coast of Borneo. Golden Legends of Korea, Golden Legends of Vietnam, and Golden Legends of the Philippines (Heinemann, 1996) were commissioned while Ingram was living in Asia, and released in Asia, UK and New Zealand. Lucy Bee and The Secret Gene (Whitegull Press, 2014), set in New Zealand, has themes of identity, bullying, friendship, school and family life. Bonjour Lucy Bee (OneTree House, 2019), set in France, has Lucy taking responsibility for a young Afghan refugee while also trying to find her place in her French family. Her stories have been broadcast on National Radio and Coast Access Radio in New Zealand.

== Radio ==
Ingram produced her own radio show for children from 2008 to 2015.
