= Noela Young =

Australian book illustrator and children's writer

- Born: Noela Margaret Grace Young; 13 March 1930
- Died: 3 April 2018 (aged 88)
- Occupation: Illustrator; children's writer; book designer
- Education: Sydney Girls High School; East Sydney Technical College
- Genre: Children's books
- Years active: 1952–2006
- Notable works: The Muddle-Headed Wombat (illustrator)

Noela Young (13 March 1930 – 3 April 2018) was an Australian illustrator and author of children's books. She is best known for her illustrations for The Muddle-Headed Wombat by Ruth Park.

== Early life and education ==
Noela Margaret Grace Young was born in Sydney on 13 March 1930. She was educated at Sydney Girls High School, completing the Leaving Certificate in 1946. She won a scholarship to East Sydney Technical College despite not studying art at school. There she met her future husband, Walter Cunningham, who taught her book illustration. She graduated in 1951 with a diploma in illustration.

== Career ==
Young worked as a freelancer in 1952 for Ure Smith and the first book she illustrated, David and His Australian Friends, by Enid Bell was described by Tribune as "delightfully illustrated", while the Courier-Mail said it was "charmingly produced and illustrated".

During her career she illustrated books by authors including Emily Rodda, Eve Pownall, Patricia Wrightson, Jean Galbraith, Christobel Mattingley and Eleanor Spence. She is, however, best known for her illustrations for the series of books by Ruth Park, beginning with The Muddle-Headed Wombat in 1962.

She was contracted by Angus & Robertson to redraw the illustrations to a number of the Snugglepot and Cuddlepie books by May Gibbs, her work on the first being described as "sensitive and imaginative". She also colourised Norman Lindsay's drawings for the 30th edition of The Magic Pudding for Angus & Robertson in 1975.

Young worked for The School Magazine, contributing illustrations for stories and poems and also lectured at the National Art School. She designed the cover and made illustrations for the publication to mark the centenary of Sydney Girls High School.

== Awards and recognition ==
In 1995 Young was presented with the Pheme Tanner Award in recognition of her 40-year contribution to Australian children's literature.

- David and His Australian Friends – joint winner, 1953 Children's Book Week competition
- Flip, the Flying Possum – commended, 1964 Picture Book of the Year, CBCA Book of the Year Awards
- John, the Mouse Who Learned to Read – commended, 1970 Picture Book of the Year, CBCA Book of the Year Awards
- Toby – winner, 1995 COOL Award for Picture Book; shortlisted, 1994 Picture Book of the Year, CBCA Book of the Year Awards
- Grandpa – honour book, 1999 Picture Book of the Year, CBCA Book of the Year Awards; winner, 1999 Picture Book and Younger Readers, Australian Family Therapists' Award for Children's Literature

== Selected works ==
=== As author/illustrator ===
- Flip, the Flying Possum (1963)
- Mrs Pademelon's Joey (1967)
- Keep Out (1975)
- Torty Longneck (1977)

=== As illustrator ===
- David and His Australian Friends by Enid Bell (Ure Smith, 1952)
- Exploring Australia by Eve Pownall (Methuen, 1958)
- The Feather Star by Patricia Wrightson (Hutchinson, 1962)
- The Muddle-Headed Wombat by Ruth Park (Angus & Robertson series, 1962–1982)
- One Sunday Morning Early by Irene Gough (Ure Smith, 1963)
- The Wish Cat, by Jean Chapman (Angus & Robertson, 1966)
- Snugglepot and Cuddlepie Meet Mr Lizard by May Gibbs (Snugglepot and Cuddlepie series, Angus & Robertson, 1970–1983)
- Once there was a Swagman by Hesba Brinsmead (OUP, 1981)
- The Brown and Yellow by Lilith Norman (OUP, 1983)
- Finders Keepers by Emily Rodda (Omnibus Books, 1990)
- Grandpa by Lilith Norman (Margaret Hamilton Books, 1998)

== Personal ==
Young married Walter Cunningham (1910–1988), one of her lecturers at East Sydney Technical College. She died on 3 April 2018.
