= Margaret Wild =

Australian children's writer

- Born: 1948 (age 77–78); Eshowe, South Africa
- Occupation: Writer for children
- Writing career
- Language: English
- Years active: 1983-
- Notable works: Fox, The Very Best of Friends
- Notable awards: 2008 Nan Chauncy Award

Margaret Wild (born 1948) is an Australian children's writer.

She has written more than 40 books for children. Her work has been published around the world and has won several awards. She was awarded the Lifetime Achievement Award by the Children's Book Council of Australia in 2022.

== Life ==
Wild was born in Eshowe, South Africa, an early European settlement. Her bank manager's family moved frequently and she attended state schools in Johannesburg. She came to Australia in 1972, worked as a magazine feature writer, and finished her education at Australian National University in Canberra. In Sydney she raised a family, worked as a freelance writer, worked sixteen years as a book editor in children's publishing—1984 to 2000, finally at ABC Books, Australian Broadcasting Corporation.

== Writer ==
Wild's books explore a diverse range of themes but she is particularly noted for exploring issues of identity, trust, and death. Let the Celebrations Begin (1991) focused on the imminent release of Jewish prisoners from a Nazi concentration camp, while in The Very Best of Friends (1989) the death of a farmer prompts his widowed wife to find the love to care for their respective pets, a cat and dog, equally. Fox (2000), illustrated by Ron Brooks using the colours of the Australian landscape, is a powerful story about trust and betrayal.

In March 2020 Wild was awarded an award for Lifetime Achievement in Literature by the Australia Council. In December 2020 she was nominated as Australia's author candidate for the 2022 Hans Christian Andersen Award.

She now lives in Sydney.

== Works ==
=== Picture books ===
- Chalk Boy, illustrated by Mandy Ord (2018)
- The Sloth that came to Stay, illustrated by Vivienne To (2017)
- Bogtrotter, illustrated by Judith Rossell (2015)
- The Bush book Club, illustrated by Ben Wood (2014)
- The Treasure Box, ill. Freya Blackwood (2013)
- Tanglewood, ill. Vivienne Goodman (2012)
- Vampyre, ill. Andrew Yeo (2011)
- Puffling, ill. Julie Vivas (2009)
- Harry & Hopper, ill. Freya Blackwood (2009)
- The Pocket dogs go on holiday, ill. Stephen Michael King (2008)
- Piglet and Papa, ill. Stephen Michael King (2007)
- Woolvs in the Sitee, ill Anne Spudvilas (2006)
- Chatterbox, ill. Deborah Niland (2006)
- The Bilbies of Bliss, ill. Noela Young (2005)
- The Little Crooked House, co-written with illustrator Jonathan Bentley (2005)
- Hop, Little Hare!, ill. Peter Shaw (2005)
- Piglet and Mama, ill. Stephen Michael King (2005)
- Farmer Fred's Cow, ill. David Waller (2004)
- Seven More Sleeps, ill. Donna Rawlins (2004)
- Kiss, Kiss!, ill. Bridget Strevens-Marzo (2003)
- Little Humpty, ill. Ann James (2003)
- Baby Boomsticks, ill. David Legge (2003)
- Mr Moo, ill. Jonathon Bentley (2002)
- Jenny Angel, ill. Anne Spudvilas (2002)
- The House of Narcissus, ill. Wayne Harris (2001)
- The Pocket Dogs, ill. Stephen Michael King (2001)
- The Midnight Feast, ill. Ann James (2001)
- Midnight Babies, ill. Ann James (2001)
- Nighty Night!, ill. Kerry Argent (2001)
- Fox, ill. Ron Brooks (2000)
- Tom Goes to Kindergarten, ill. David Legge (2000)
- Miss Lily's Fabulous Pink Feather Boa, ill. Kerry Argent (1999)
- Old Pig, co-written with illustrator Ron Brooks (1999)
- Our Granny, ill. Julie Vivas (1998)
- Rosie and Tortoise, ill. Ron Brooks (1998)
- First Day, ill. by Kim Gamble (1998)
- Bim Bam Boom!, ill. Wayne Harris (1998)
- Big Cat Dreaming, ill. Anne Spudvilas (1997)
- The Midnight Gang, ill. Ann James (1997)
- Remember Me, ill. Dee Huxley (1995)
- Beast, (1995)
- Mr. Nick's Knitting, ill. Dee Huxley (1994)
- Going Home, ill. Wayne Harris (1994)
- Toby, ill. Noela Young (1994)
- The Slumber Party, ill. David Cox (1993)
- But Granny Did, ill. Ian Forss (1993)
- Space Travellers, ill. Gregory Rogers (1993)
- All the Better to See You With!, ill. Pat Reynolds (1993)
- Thank You, Santa, ill. Kerry Argent (1992)
- My Dearest Dinosaur, ill. Donna Rawlins (1992)
- Let the Celebrations Begin!, ill. Julie Vivas (1991)
- The Very Best of Friends, ill. Julie Vivas (1990)
- Kathy's Umbrella, ill. Hannah Koch (1987)
- There's a Sea in My Bedroom, ill. Jane Tanner (1984)
- Something Absolutely Enormous, ill. Jack Hannah (1984)

=== Novels ===
- Diary of Megan Moon (1988)
- Beast (1992)
- Jinx (2001)
- One Night (2003)
- The Vanishing Moment (2013)

== Awards ==
=== Personal ===
- Won – Nan Chauncy Award (2008)
- Won – Lifetime Achievement Award, Children's Book Council of Australia (2022)

=== For books ===
There's a Sea in My Bedroom

- Shortlisted – CBCA Children's Book of the Year Award: Picture Book (1985)
- Shortlisted – Kate Greenaway Award (UK) (1985)

The Very Best of Friends

- Won – CBCA Children's Book of the Year Award: Picture Book (1990)

The Midnight Gang

- Won – Books I Love Best Yearly: Early Readers Award (1998)

Miss Lily's Fabulous Pink Feather Boa

- Shortlisted – Young Australian Best Book Award: Picture Book (1999)

Jenny Angel

- Shortlisted – Family Award for Children's Books: Picture Book (1999)
- Shortlisted – Australian Publishers Association: Design (1999)
- Shortlisted – New South Wales State Literary Award: Young Reader (2000)
- Won – CBCA Children's Book of the Year Award: Picture Book (2000)
- Shortlisted – Young Australian Best Book Award: Picture Book (2001)

The Pocket Dogs

- Shortlisted – CBCA Children's Book of the Year Award: Early Childhood (2001)
- Shortlisted – Young Australian Best Book Award: Picture Book (2003)
- Shortlisted – BILBY Award#Early Readers Award#Books I Love Best Yearly: Early Readers Award (2003)

Fox

- Won – CBCA Children's Book of the Year Award: Picture Book (2001)
- Won – Queensland Premier's Literary Awards: Children's Book Award (2001)
- Won – Deutscher Jugendliteraturpreis (2004)

Baby Boomsticks

- Won – Books I Love Best Yearly: Early Readers Award (2006)

Woolvs in the Sitee

- Won – Aurealis Award for Best Children's Fiction (2006)
- Shortlisted – CBCA Children's Book of the Year Award: Picture Book (2007)
- Shortlisted – ABPA Book Design Awards: Picture Book (2007)

Chatterbox

- Shortlisted – CBCA Children's Book of the Year Award: Early Childhood (2007)
