= Dianne Bates =

Australian writer and teacher (born 1948)

Dianne (Di) Bates
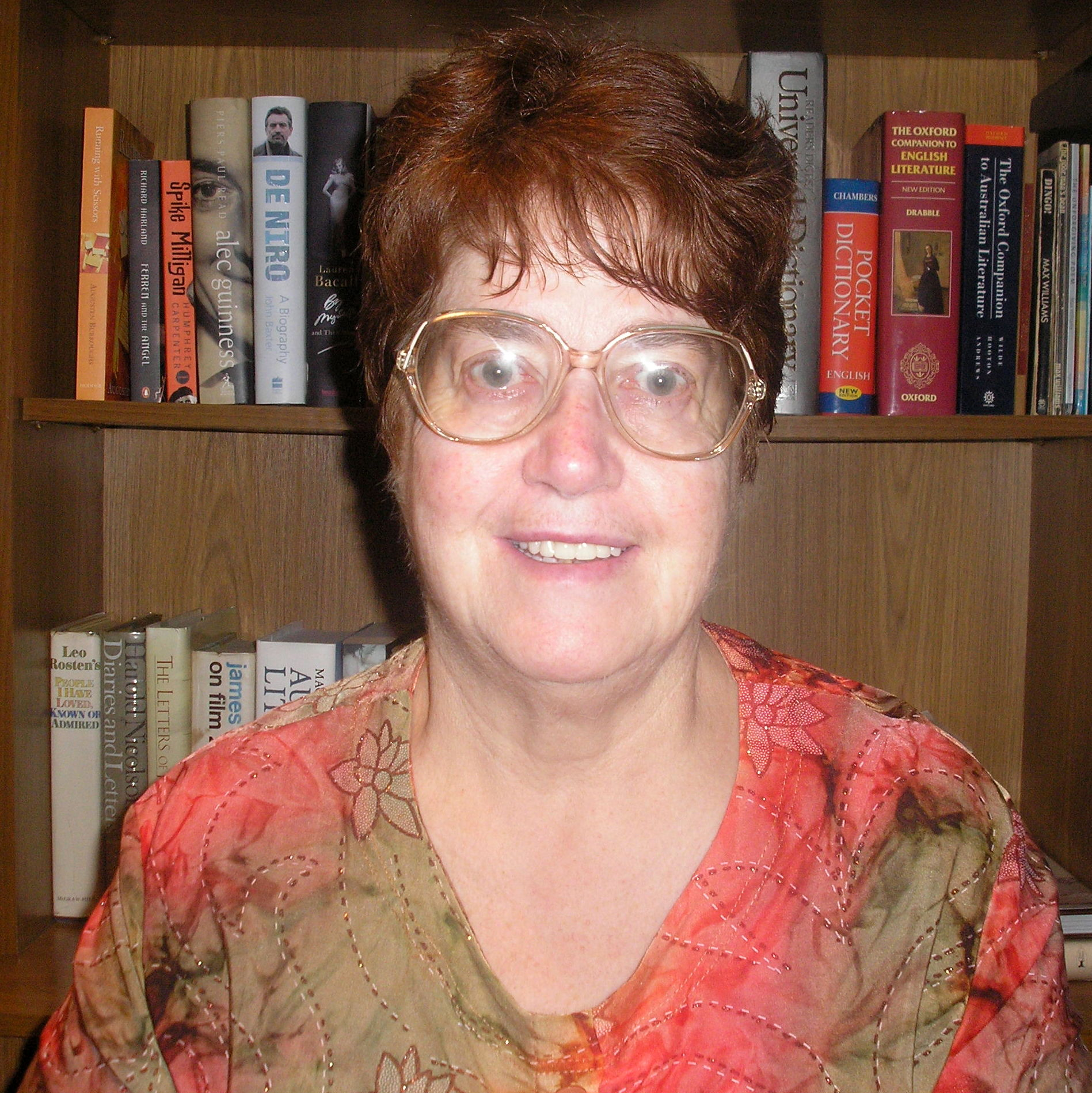
- Born: 20 March 1948 (age 78); Sydney, Australia
- Occupations: Author, teacher
- Writing career
- Period: 1980–present
- Genres: Children's literature, non-fiction, young adult fiction, fiction
- Website: diannedibates.blogspot.com.au

Dianne "Di" Bates is an Australian writer and teacher .

== Early years ==
Bates was born 20 March 1948 in Sydney, daughter of Richard Amos and Moira Power, and spent her early years in Appin, New South Wales. She attended Campbelltown Performing Arts High School.

== Career ==
Bates completed teaching training in Wollongong, since gaining a Bachelor of Arts at the University of Wollongong.

While teaching, Bates began her writing career with her first book, Terri, published by Penguin Books in 1980. Since then, she has published over 140 books, mostly for young readers. Some of these books have won state and national awards; others have been translated into French, Danish and German. Her junior verse novel, Nobody's Boy and junior novel, The Shape, have won CBCA Notable Awards.

Bates has received Grants and Fellowships from the Literature Board of the Australia Council for the Arts and has toured for the National Book Council.

Bates has undertaken commissioned writing for a large number of organisations and has worked on the editorial team of the New South Wales Department of Education School Magazine. She was co-editor of a national children's magazine, Puffinalia (Penguin Books) and editor of another national magazine, Little Ears.

Bates has founded several sub-branches of the Children's Book Council of Australia (CBCA) of NSW. She has presented community radio and television programs about children's literature and reviewed books in numerous magazines. She has also worked as a regional newspaper editor.

In 2008, Bates was awarded The Lady Cutler Award for distinguished services to children's Literature.

Bates is married to prize-winning YA author, Bill Condon, whose awards include the Prime Minister's Literary Award in the inaugural category of young adult fiction and two CBCA Honor Books of the Year. She lives in Wollongong, NSW where she works as a freelance writer and manuscript assessor and writes a popular blog Writing for Children.

== Awards and Commendations ==
- 1987 Writer's Fellowship from the Literature Board of the Australia Council
- 1988 Writer's Fellowships from the Literature Board of the Australia Council
- 1988 West Australian Young Readers' Book Award (Grandma Cadbury's Trucking Tales)
- 1993 Special Award, Australian Multicultural Children's Literature Award (I'm An Australian: A Classroom Journal)
- 1995 Varuna Writers' Centre Fellowship
- 1999 Kids' Own Australian Literature Award (Desert Dan the Dunnyman)
- 2000 Varuna Writers' Centre Fellowship
- 2001 Children's Book Council of Australia Notable Book (The Shape)
- 2002 Kids Own Australian Literature Award Hall of Fame (Big Bad Bruce)
- 2008 Lady Cutler Award for distinguished services to children's literature
- 2013 Children's Book Council of Australia Notable Book (Nobody's Boy)

== Published books ==
- A Fine Line: A Collection of Poetry (Cyberwit, 2021) ISBN 978-93-88319-61-4
- The Year I Was Born 1983 (Moondrake, 1993) ISBN 1 86391 208 8
- The Year I Was Born 1984 (Moondrake, 1993) ISBN 1 86391 209 6
- A Gaggle of Giggles (Phoenix Education, 2015) ISBN 9781921586972
- A Game of Keeps (Celapene Press, 2014) ISBN 978 0 9873677 8 5
- Awesome Cats (Big Sky Publishing, 2015) ISBN 9781925275407
- Awesome Dogs (Big Sky Publishing, 2015) ISBN 9781925275384
- Awesome Horses (Big Sky Publishing, 2016) ISBN 9781925275858
- A Night at Benny's (Harcourt Brace, 1989) ISBN 0 729 509 060
- A Tree House (CUP, 2008) ISBN 978 0 521 71026 8
- Aussie Kid Heroes (Interactive Publications, 2009) ISBN 1921088 44 3
- Badu Boys Rule! (Insight Publications, 2006) ISBN 1921088 44 3
- Belly Busters (Random House, 1994) ISBN 9780091829452
- Belligrumble Bigfoot (Roo Books) about 1983
- Between You and Me (Pearson Education, 2003) ISBN 0-1236-0229-7
- Big Bad Bruce illus Phoebe Middleton (A & R, 1994) ISBN 0 207 18831 9, 0 207 17696 5
- Big Bad Bruce illus Cheryll Johns (Koala Books, 2007) ISBN 0 86461 7712
- Basil Bopp the Burper (Hodder Headline, 1996) ISBN 9 780733 603693
- Basil Bopp the Burper (Five Senses Education, 2010). ISBN 978 1741304565
- Big Boss (Little Pink Dogs, 2020) ISBN 978 0648964063
- Billy Fishbone, King of the Kids (Hodder Headline, 1997) ISBN 9780733 605079
- Billy Fishbone, King of the Kids (Five Senses Education, 2010) ISBN 978 1741304602
- Blowflies and Glow-Worms (CUP, 2008) ISBN 9780 521 71067 1
- Boys Only (No Girls) Otford Press, 2002) ISBN 1 876928 93 X
- Brad the Wonder Baby (Blake Education, 2000) ISBN 1 86509 331 9
- Bushranger Bob & the Nude Olympics (with Bill Condon) (Hodder Headline, 1999) ISBN 0 7336 1038 2
- Bushranger Bob & the Nude Olympics (with Bill Condon) (Five Senses Education, 2010) ISBN 978 1741304657
- Bushrangers Teacher Source Book (Five Senses Education) ISBN 9781741304671
- Candy in the Kitchen (Collins, 1989) ISBN 07 3227 320X
- Carl's Café (Thomas Nelson, 2002) ISBN 0 7339 33386, 07608 5799 7
- Cassandra's Clever Dad by Dianne Bates & Bill Condon (Macmillan, 2012) ISBN 978420219005
- Champion Children (Heinemann Library, 1998) ISBN 1 86391 694 6
- Christmas Around the World (Macmillan) ISBN 0 7 329 0215 0
- Christmas Carols, Songs and Poems (Macmillan) ISBN 0 732 902 126
- Christmas in Australia (Macmillan) ISBN 0 732 902 169
- Christmas Make and Do (Macmillan) ISBN 0 7329 0217 7
- Christmas Stories (Macmillan) ISBN 0 7329 02134
- Cinderfella (Penguin, 2001) ISBN 0141312653
- Crossing the Line (Ford Street Publishing, 2008) ISBN 978 1 876462 70 3
- Crash Landing (Thomas Nelson, 2002) ISBN 0 17 0105148
- Daisy's Bedtime (Clavis Books, 2022)
- Dame Nellie Nickabocka, shooting Star (Hodder Headline, 1996) ISBN 9 7807 33 603723
- Dame Nellie Nickabocka, shooting Star (Five Senses Education, 2010) ISBN 978 174130 4596
- Daring Dora and the All-Girl Gang (Hodder Headline, 1996) ISBN 9 78 0733 603358
- Daring Dora and the All-Girl Gang (Five Senses Education) ISBN 978 1 741304633
- Dateless & Desperate (Pearson Education, 2002) ISBN 07339 3472 2
- Desert Dan the Dunnyman (Hodder Headline, 1997) ISBN 978-0733605093
- Desert Dan the Dunnyman (Five Senses Education, 2010) ISBN 978 1 741304619
- Erky Perky Silly Stuff (Five Senses Education, 2013) ISBN 978 1741307801
- Fangs (Thomas Nelson, 2002) ISBN 017 010513 X
- Famous & Fabulous Kids (Jacaranda Wiley, 1995) ISBN 0 73121 652 0
- Freaky Fact or Fiction (Hinkler Books 2011) ISBN 978 174 1852530
- Getting Even (Rigby Heinemann, 1996) ISBN 0-7312-1979-1
- Giggle and Grin (Five Senses Education, 2012) ISBN 978 1741305982
- Grandma Cadbury's Bikie Gang (A&R, 1993) ISBN 0 207 179182
- Grandma Cadbury's Safari Tours (A&R, 1989) ISBN 0207163448
- Grandma Cadbury's Trucking Tales (A&R, 1987) ISBN 0 207 158 770 (WINNER 1988 WEST AUSTRALIAN YOUNG READERS' BOOK AWARD)
- Grandma Cadbury's Water World (Hodder Headline, 1997) ISBN 0-7336-0472-2
- Hairy Hannah and the Grandad Gang (Hodder Headline, 1997) ISBN 9 780733 605086
- Hairy Hannah and the Grandad Gang (Five Senses Education, 2010) ISBN 978174130 4589
- Here Comes Trouble! (Dragon Tales Publishing, 2015) ISBN 9780992523961
- How Christmas Began (Macmillan, 1990) ISBN 0 7329 02142
- How the Sun was Made: A Traditional Aboriginal Story
- How to Self-Edit (To Improve Your Writing) (Emerald Publishers, India, 2005) ISBN 81 7966 159 8.
- How to Self-Edit (To Improve Your Writing) (Five Senses Education, 2009) ISBN 978 1 741 30 683 5
- I'm An Australian: A Class Journal (Jacaranda Wiley, 1992) ISBN 0 7016 30280 (WINNER SPECIAL PRIZE 1993 MULTICULTURAL CHILDREN’S LITERATURE AWARD)
- In Big Trouble (Rigby, 1996) ISBN 0-7312-2164-8
- Inventions (Heinemann Library, 1998) ISBN 1 86391 693 8
- Jacob Fang & His Feral Family (Hodder Headline, 1996) ISBN 9 780733 603716
- Jacob Fang & His Feral Family (Five Senses Education, 2010) ISBN 978 174130 462 6
- Junk (CUP, 2008) ISBN 978 0 521 71025 1
- Justin's Wells, illustrated by Tony Flowers (Rigby, 2007) ISBN 978 07312 7486 4
- Kings of the Creek (Rigby, 2001) ISBN 0 7312 2743 3
- Looking for Imani (Woodslane Press, 2025) ISBN 978-1-922800-98-5
- Mad, Bad Jason (Austin Macauley, UK, 2020)
- Madcap Cafe & other humorous plays (with Bill Condon; Brooks Waterloo, 1986) ISBN 978-0216926653
- Making Friends on Beacon Street (Mimosa, 1992) ISBN 0 7 32771 048
- Money Smart Kids (Ibis, 2005) ISBN 1 920923 90 X
- My Family (CUP, 2008) ISBN 978 0 521 71017 6
- My Other Mother (Rigby Heinemann, 1996) ISBN 0-7312-2155-9
- My Wacky Gran (Angus & Robertson, 1994) ISBN 0 207 18537 9/ also ISBN 0 207 19167 0 (1997)
- Ned the Nong & the Kelly Kids (with Bill Condon) (Hodder Headline, 1999) ISBN 0 7336 1040 4
- Ned the Nong & the Kelly Kids (with Bill Condon) (Five Senses Education, 2010) ISBN 9781741304640
- Nick Knickers & The Great Santa Round-up (with Bill Condon) (Hodder Headline, 1999) ISBN 0 7336 1039 0
- Nick Knickers & The Great Santa Round-up (with Bill Condon) Five Senses Education, 2010)
- Nobody's Boy (Celapene Press, 2012) ISBN 978 0 9872556 00
- Operation Lily-Liver (with Bill Condon, 1987) ISBN 0 333 412 192
- Our Home is Dirt by Sea (a poetry anthology, Walker Books Australia, 2016) ISBN 9781925081190
- Out of the Blue (Pearson Education, 2005)
- Piggy Moss (Puffin, 1982) ISBN 0140 3153 65
- Promise Not to Laugh (Angus & Robertson, 1996) ISBN 0-207-19142-5 (with Chris McTrustry)
- Resourceful Kids (Rigby, 1997) ISBN 07312 2215 6
- Revise, Edit & Re-Write (Ashton Scholastic, 1994) ISBN 1 86388 173 5
- Rotten Rellies (Nelson, 1997) ISBN 9 780170 093019
- Schools at War! (Random House, 1997) ISBN 9780091 832926
- Scrum O’Crum & the Bushranger Babes (Hodder Headline, 1997) ISBN 0 7336 0510 9
- Scrum O’Crum & the Bushranger Babes (Five Senses Education, 2010) ISBN 978 1741304572
- Skin and Bones (CUP, 2008) ISBN 978 0521 710701
- Stagestruck! (plays with Bill Condon; HBJ, 1992) ISBN 0 729 5086 5X
- Supermouth (Rigby, 1995) ISBN 0 7312 1947 3
- Terri (Puffin, 1981) ISBN 01 4031 3761
- The Adventures of Jellybean, with Bill Condon (UQP, 2018) ISBN 978 07022 60001
- The Belligrumble Bigfoot (Roo Books, 1984) ISBN 0 9499 24474
- The Best Teacher Ever (Woodslane Press, 2025) ISBN 978-1-923350-08-3
- The Bogeyman in the Garden (Longman, 1995) ISBN 0582378184
- The Boy Who Loved Chocolate (Omnibus, 1990) ISBN 978-0140345704
- The Butti Butti Bunyip, illustrated by Greg Holfield (Omnibus Books, 2015) ISBN 9781742991252
- The Case of the Kidnapped Brat with Bill Condon (Reed Mystery Mammoth, 1995) ISBN 0582 910684, 1-86330-475-4
- The Curse of King Nevertrustme (Angus & Robertson, 1995) ISBN 0 207 18786 X
- The Funnies: Cartoons and Comics (Jacaranda Press, 1993) ISBN 0 7016 2816 2
- The Girl in the Basement (Morris Publishing Australia, 2013) ISBN 978 0 987543417
- The Hold-Up Heroes (National Museum of Australia, 2005) ISBN 978-1876944384
- The Last Refuge (Hodder Headline, 1996) ISBN 0 7336 0318 1
- The Little Red Hen, infants' play (Macmillan, 1987) ISBN 978-0307960306
- The Magician (Rigby, 1988) ISBN 0 731 202 740
- The Musicians of Bremen, infants' play (Macmillan, 1987) ISBN 0 8136 36442
- The Pobblebonk Frog (CUP, 2008) ISBN 978 0 521 71024 4
- The Trouble with Parents (Supa Dupas, 1997)
- The New Writer's Survival Guide (Penguin, 1989) ISBN 01 4011 5080
- The Shape (Allen and Unwin, 2000) ISBN 1 86508 353 4
- The Worst Cook in the World (Nelson, 1987) ISBN 0 454 01254 3
- The Slacky Flat Gang (with Bill Condon; Brooks Waterloo, 1988) ISBN 0864 400888
- Thirteen Going on Forty (Hodder Headline)
- To the Moon and Back (Big Sky Publishing, 2017) ISBN 978 1 925520 29 3
- Top Tasty Treats (Jacaranda, 1993) ISBN 0 7016 3195 3
- Treasure Seekers (Longman, 2001)
- Troublemaker (Addison Wesley Longman 1996) ISBN 0 7791 0828 0 + (Sundance, 1997) ISBN 0 7608 0768 X
- The Trouble with Parents (Longman, 1996) ISBN 0-582-80486-8 + (Scholastic, Canada, 2001) ISBN 0 7791 0827 2
- The Worst Cook in the World (Nelson, 1987) ISBN 045 4012543
- Thirteen Going on Forty (Hodder & Stoughton, 1986) ISBN 0 340 376120
- Top Tasty Treats (Jacaranda Press, 1993) ISBN 0 7016 3195 3
- Treasure Seekers (Pearson Education, 2001) ISBN 0 7339 2470 0 (with Ann C Whitehead & Bill Condon)
- Troublemaker (Longman, 1995) ISBN 0 582 80485 X
- Urgent Delivery (Thomas Nelson, 2002) ISBN 0 17 010519 9
- Villains ((Heinemann Library, 1996) ISBN 1 86391 457 9
- When Melissa-Ann Came to Dinner (Harcourt Brace, 1989) ISBN 07 2950 8099
- Whales (CUP, 2008) ISBN 978 0 521 71069 5
- Wild and Wacky Adventurers with Bill Condon (IP Kidz, 2022)
- We Care for Our School (Landmark, NZ, 1996) ISBN 0732940516
- Who Pushed Humpty? (with Mary Small, illustrated Craig Smith, Mimosa, 1992) ISBN 978-0732709600
- Wordgames (Longman Cheshire, 1993) ISBN 0 582 91068 4
- Wordgames (Five Senses Education, 2009) ISBN 9781 74130 682 8
- Writing Essentials: A Teacher's Guide to Grammar, Punctuation & Word Usage (Hawker Brownlow, 2017) ISBN 978 1760 56329 5
- Your Teeth (CUP, 2008) ISBN 978 0 521 71068 8
- Zoo Animals (CUP, 2008) ISBN 978 0 521 71071 8
