= Freya Blackwood =

Australian artist (born 1975)

Freya Blackwood (born 1975) is an Australian illustrator and special effects artist. She worked on special effects for The Lord of the Rings film trilogy from 2001 to 2003 and won the Kate Greenaway Medal for British children's book illustration in 2010.

== Early life ==
Blackwood was born in Edinburgh, Scotland, while her parents were touring the United Kingdom. She grew up in Orange, New South Wales. Before becoming a full-time illustrator, she lived in New Zealand and worked on The Lord of the Rings films, specifically the special effects for the hobbits' feet. She finished a Bachelor of Design at the University of Technology, Sydney, and finished two short films during her work in the Sydney film industry.

== Film industry career ==
Blackwood worked in the film industry between 2001 and 2008, producing the film Blackspot (2008), acting as an extra in the short film Zombie Movie (2005). She was a special effects artist for all three The Lord of the Rings films: The Fellowship of the Ring, The Two Towers, and The Return of the King.

== Children's books ==
As of June 2010, Blackwood has illustrated eleven books, three of which have been published in the United Kingdom by Scholastic. As of June 2013, WorldCat libraries report holding more than fifteen titles in 2003 to 2012 editions, written by Blackwood herself, Alan Bagnall, Nick Bland, Chardi Christian, Rosie Dickins, Roddy Doyle, Libby Gleeson, John Heffernan, Heiwari Johnson, Cecily Matthews, Kyle Mewburn, Jan Ormerod, A. B. Paterson, and Margaret Wild. Half a World Away by Libby Gleeson is held by the greatest number of libraries

Blackwood both wrote and illustrated (in watercolour and pencil) Ivy Loves to Give (US edition: Scholastic, 2010), a 24-page picture book about a toddler, for ages two and up. The story features the "well-intentioned mistakes" of a "toddler who is learning where things belong".

Blackwood won the annual Kate Greenaway Medal from the professional librarians for her part in the picture book Harry & Hopper, written by Margaret Wild and published by Scholastic in 2009. The award recognises the year's best-illustrated children's book published in the U.K. Her illustrations of Hopper were inspired by a dog she had as a child. The story features a boy and puppy who are "inseparable" until the puppy is killed while the boy is at school. "Blackwood's beautiful illustrations—laser print with watercolour, gouache and charcoal—add an appropriate layer of melancholy to Wild's clean, economical prose."
