= Anne Bower Ingram =

Australian children's author and publisher

Anne Bower Ingram OAM
- Born: Anne Whitten Bower; 18 October 1937; Manilla, New South Wales
- Died: 26 March 2010 (aged 72)
- Occupation: Publisher
- Known for: Children's literature

Anne Bower Ingram OAM (1937–2010) was an Australian children's author and publisher.

== Life ==
Ingram was born in Manilla, New South Wales on 18 October 1937. She left school at 15 to work in a bookshop. At age 21 Ingram travelled to Britain, and joined the publisher William Collins.

Anne married Clark Ingram in 1964, but they divorced in 1977. Over her career, she launched and supported the careers of countless writers and illustrators and championed Australian children's literature in Australia and overseas.

For the 1988 bicentenary, Ingram organized for an exhibition of Australian children's book illustrations in Bologna and other European destinations.

Ingram died on 26 March 2010 aged 72.

== Awards ==
- 1984 Lady Cutler Award for Distinguished Services to Children's Literature in New South Wales
- 1985 Dromkeen Medal
- 1986 Medal of the Order of Australia

== Works ==
- Shudders and Shakes: Ghostly tales from Australia, Collins, 1972 OCLC 696282
- Too True: Australian tall tales, Collins, 1974 OCLC 2817442
- The Pickled Boeing : An illustrated collection of stories and poems, as editor, Children's Medical Research Foundation, 1982 ISBN 0959363807
- Mouse's Marriage, co-author and illustrator Junko Morimoto, Lothian Books, 1985 ISBN 0850912199
- Ford Family Car Fun Book, co-compiler Peggy O'Donnell, illustrated by Bob Graham, Ellsyd Press, 1986 ISBN 0949290270
- The Twin Stars, adapted from story by Kenji Miyazawa, illustrated by Junko Morimoto, Lothian Books, 1986 ISBN 0850912350
- Camping : Let's do it together, co-author Peggy O'Donnell, illustrated by Bob Graham, Ellsyd Press, 1987 ISBN 094929036X
- Making a Picture Book, Methuen Australia, 1987 ISBN 0454009771
- The Moose, the Goose and the Watermelon Juice, by Sue Jackman, illustrated by Clare Watson, Collins, 1989 ISBN 0732248957
