= Patricia Mullins =

Australian artist (born 1952)

- Born: 1952 (age 73–74)
- Genre: Children's books
- Notable awards: Children's Book of the Year Award: Eve Pownall Award for Information Books (1994); Dromkeen Medal (2012)

Patricia Mullins (born 1952) is a children's book illustrator. Some of Mullins' illustrations are in the Albert Ullin collection of the Ian Potter Centre: NGV Australia.

== Books ==
=== Written and illustrated by Patricia Mullins ===
- A Crash of Rhinos: Fun With Collective Nouns (2010) OCLC 501813792
- One Horse Waiting For Me (1997) OCLC 152456354
- V for Vanishing: An Alphabet of Endangered Animals (1993) OCLC 38325524
- Dinosaur Encore (1992) OCLC 27630272
- The Rocking Horse: A History of Moving Toy Horses, (includes a supplement: International Survey of Rocking Horse Manufacture by Marguerite Fawdry) (1992) OCLC 246975025
- Fabulous Beasts, pub. William Collins (1976) ISBN 9780001850194

=== Illustrated by Patricia Mullins ===
- Lightning Jack, Glenda Millard (2012) ISBN 9781741693911 hbk, ISBN 9781741693928 pbk
- Jerry, Ursula Dubosarsky (2009)
- Phar Lap, the wonder horse, Kerin Jackie (2008) ISBN 9780980381313
- Only a Donkey, Celeste Walters (2007) ISBN 9780143501220
- Who's Who at The Zoo, Celeste Walters anthology (1996)
- The Dream of the Dusky Dolphin, Jonathan Harlen (1995)
- Iceflowers, Jutta Goetze (1992)
- The Sea Breeze Hotel, Marcia Vaughan (1991) OCLC 27629849
- The Triantiwantigongalope CJ Dennis (1989)
- Shoes From Grandpa, Mem Fox (1989) OCLC 27576021
- Crocodile Beat, Gail Jorgensen (1988) OCLC 24497999
- Hattie and the Fox, Mem Fox (1986) OCLC 27575624
- The Magic Saddle, Christobel Mattingley (1983) OCLC 28997094
- Duck Boy, Christobel Mattingley (1983)
- Rummage, Christobel Mattingley (1981)
- All Sort of Poems, ed. Ann Thwaites anthology (1978)
- Pelican Point, Sue Couper (1977)
- Wheels and Things, Veda-Hamon Moody and others (1976)
- Flowers for Samantha, Letitia Parr (1975)
- All In Together, Vashti Farrer (1974)
- Blinky Bill and Nutsy, Dorothy Wall (1972)
- Dolphins are Different, Letitia Parr (1972)
- The Happy Bush, Heather Larsen (1972)

== Awards ==
- 1982 Children's Book of the Year Award: Picture Book Rummage
- 1993 Australian Book Publishers Association: Best Designed, Illustrated Children's Book V For Vanishing
- 1993 Parents' Choice Award USA Hattie and The Fox
- 1994 Children's Book of the Year Award: Eve Pownall Award for Information Books V For Vanishing
- 1994 Wilderness Society Environment Award for Children's Literature: Picture fiction V for Vanishing
- 1994 VI Dimensional Illustrators Awards, New York, USA V For Vanishing
- 1994 Best Produced English Children's Book, Hong Kong Dinosaur Encore
- 1998 10th Dimensional Illustrators Awards, New York, USA One Horse Waiting For Me
- 2008 Pat Glover Memorial Storytelling Award Phar Lap the Wonder Horse
- 2012 Dromkeen Medal
- 2014 International Board on Books for Young People IBBY Australia's Honour Book for Illustration Lightning Jack

== Restoration of carousel horses ==
Mullins undertook the restoration of the carousel horses from the Melbourne Zoo Carousel in a studio in Fitzroy. The restoration was completed in 2005.
