= Libby Gleeson =

Australian children's author

- Born: 1950 (age 75–76); Young, New South Wales, Australia
- Occupation: Author
- Spouse: Euan Tovey
- Children: 3 including Jessica Tovey
- Website: www.libbygleeson.com.au

Libby Gleeson AM (born 1950) is an Australian children's author. Born in Young, New South Wales, she is one of six children, the sister of former ABC TV Washington Correspondent Michael Gleeson, and the mother of Home and Away actress Jessica Tovey and Sydney Morning Herald journalist Josephine Tovey. Her sister, Margie Gleeson, works as the head teacher of Creative and Performing Arts at Albury High School.

She studied at the University of Sydney where she took history before teaching for two years in the rural town of Picton near Sydney. In the mid-1970s she lived for five years in Italy where she taught English and then London, where she began to write her first novel, Eleanor Elizabeth. Once returned from overseas she taught at the University of Sydney.

In the last twenty years, she has written twenty books and taught occasional courses in creative writing. She specialises in picture books, novels for young children and also novels for slightly older readers. She's also written scripts for the ABC's Bananas in Pyjamas and Magic Mountain. She is married to scientist Euan Tovey, has three adult daughters and lives in Sydney's inner west. She is currently a Fellow on the World Research, Advisory and Education Team of MindChamps with a focus on education.

== Picture books ==
- One Sunday Illustrated by John Winch
- Mum Goes to Work Illustrated by Penny Azar
- Where's Mum? Illustrated by Craig Smith
- Sleep Time Illustrated by Armin Greder
- Big Dog (1991) Illustrated by Armin Greder
- The Princess and the Perfect Dish (1995) Illustrated by Armin Greder
- The Great Bear (1999) Illustrated by Armin Greder
- An Ordinary Day (2001) Illustrated by Armin Greder
- Shutting the Chooks In (2003) Illustrated by Ann James
- Cuddle Time (2004) Illustrated by Julie Vivas
- Amy and Louis (2006) Illustrated by Freya Blackwood
- Clancy and Millie and the Very Fine House (2009) Illustrated by Freya Blackwood
- A Simply Spectacular Hat (2009) Illustrated by Dee Texidor

== Junior fiction ==
- Skating on Sand (1994) Illustrated by Ann James
- Hannah Plus One (1996) Illustrated by Ann James
- Queen of the Universe (1997) Illustrated by David Cox
- Hannah and the Tomorrow Room (1999) Illustrated by Ann James
- Dear Writer (2000) Illustrated by David Cox
- My Story: The Rum Rebellion, the diary of David Bellamy (2001)
- Hannah the Famous(2004) Illustrated by Ann James
- Ray's Olympics (2006) Illustrated by David Cox
- Happy Birthday X3 (2007) Illustrated by David Cox
- Clancy's Long Walk (2007) Illustrated by Chantal Stewart
- Red (2012)

== Young adult fiction ==
- Eleanor, Elizabeth (1984)
- I am Susannah (1987)
- Dodger (1990)
- Love Me, Love Me Not (1993)
- Refuge (1998)
- Mahtab's Story (2008)

== Awards ==
- 1991 Children's Peace Literature Award
- 1997 Lady Cutler Award
- 1997 CBCA Book of the Year, Younger Readers
- 2007 Member of the Order of Australia
- 2011 Dromkeen Medal
- 2011 NSW Premier's Literary Awards - Special Award
- 2013 Prime Minister's Literary Awards - children's fiction
- 2015 Children's Book of the Year Award: Younger Readers
