= All in a Day's Work =

All in a Day's Work may refer to:

== Music ==
- All in a Day's Work, a 2005 album by Bob Baldwin
- All in a Day's Work, a 2009 album by Saigon
- "All in a Day's Work", a song by Dr. Dre on Compton
- "All in a Day's Work", a song by Eels on Shootenanny!
- "All in a Day's Work", a song from the Tomorrow Never Dies soundtrack

== Television ==
- "All in a Day's Work", Amanda's episode 1 (1983)
- "All in a Day's Work", The Bill series 18, episode 78 (2002)
- "All in a Day's Work", Bottle Boys series 1, episode 4 (1984)
- "All in a Day's Work", Caillou season 1, episode 1b (2000)
- "All in a Day's Work", Doc (2001) season 1, episode 1 (2001)
- "All in a Day's Work", The Flying Doctors series 3, episode 4 (1988)
- "All in a Day's Work", From a Bird's Eye View episode 12 (1970)
- "All in a Day's Work", G.P. season 3, episode 34 (1991)
- "All in a Day's Work", Happy (1960) season 2, episode 4 (1961)
- "All in a Day's Work", Ironside (1967) season 1, episode 21 (1968)
- "All in a Day's Work", Mona the Vampire season 3, episode 5a (2002)
- "All in a Day's Work", Monsters (American) season 1, episode 21 (1989)
- "All in a Day's Work", Outlaws (1960) season 2, episode 24 (1962)
- "All in a Day's Work", Pigeon Street series 1, episode 1 (1981)
- "All in a Day's Work", She's the Sheriff season 1, episode 1 (1987)
- "All in a Day's Work", Sitting Ducks season 1, episode 13b (2002)
- "All in a Day's Work", Survivor South Africa: Immunity Island episode 12 (2021)
- "All in a Day's Work", Z-Cars series 6, episodes 67–68 (1968)

== Other ==
- All in the Day's Work: An Autobiography, a 1939 book by Ida M. Tarbell
- It's All in the Day's Work, a 1916 book by Henry Churchill King
