= Caillou's Holiday Movie =

- DVD Cover
- Directed by: Nick Rijgersberg
- Story by: Peter Svatek
- Produced by: Lesley Taylor; Natalie Dumoulin
- Starring: Annie Bovaird
- Narrated by: Merlee Shapiro
- Cinematography: Mario Allard; Benjamin Arcand; Rachel Bernard; Cathy Boisvert; Frederic Bouchard; Chu Ying Chow; Sophie Codaire; Thierry Dansereau; Guy Dubé; Rouja Koleva
- Edited by: Nathalie Rossin; Micheal Simard
- Music by: Leon Aronson
- Production company: CINAR Corporation (Caillou Special 1 Productions Inc.)
- Distributed by: Sony Wonder
- Release dates: October 7, 2003 (United States); October 28, 2003 (Canada)
- Running time: 73 minutes
- Country: Canada
- Languages: French; English

Caillou's Holiday Movie is a 2003 Canadian animated Christmas film, based on the Canadian TV series Caillou, itself based on the book series of the same name by Hélène Desputeaux. The film was directed by Nick Rijgersberg, from a screenplay written by Peter Svatek (who also wrote the story); producers were Evelyn Anyosz, Andre Auger, Diane Dallaire, Natalie Dumoulin, Louis Fournier, Julie Lovelock, Lesley Taylor and Steven Valin.

Caillou's Holiday Movie was released direct-to-video on VHS and DVD in the United States on October 7, 2003 and in Canada on October 28, 2003; by Warner Home Video and Sony Wonder, respectively.

== Plot ==
It's a very special holiday for Caillou when he learns about Christmas traditions around the world and the importance of giving and sharing. When Caillou wonders just how many days there are left until Christmas, his father gives him a Christmas calendar featuring holiday traditions from countries around the world in every window. Caillou also goes tobogganing, learns how to ski and plays Hanukkah games with his friend Leo. Caillou also gives away some of his toys when he learns about children around the world that are in need of toys such as his old ones he no longer plays with. Caillou's little sister Rosie also gets in on the Christmas fun. When Caillou's mother offers to help Rosie with making gifts, Rosie decides to try it on her own.

== Voice cast ==
- Annie Bovaird as Caillou
- Merlee Shapiro as Storyteller
- Jennifer Seguin as Mom
- Pat Fry as Dad
- Jesse Vinet as Rosie/Kid Elf
- Vince Davies as Leo
- Brigid Tierney as Clementine
- Amanda Tilson as Sarah
- Pauline Little as Grandma/first Elderly Woman
- George Morris as Grandpa
- Jason Szwimer as Elf
- Dean Patrick Fleming as Fireman Eric
- Liz MacRae as Leo's Mom
- Walter Massey as Santa
- Jennifer Morehouse as Firewoman Stacie/second Elderly Woman
- Terry Simpson as Mailman
- Amanda Strawn as Teacher Loraine
- Brian Wrench as Jonas

== Production ==
Caillou's Holiday Movie was produced at Caillou Special 1 Productions Inc (a subsidiary of CINAR Corporation). The previous English voice actress for Caillou, Jaclyn Linetsky (who also played Lori Mackney in What's with Andy?, Meg in Mega Babies, and Megan O' Connor in 15/Love), died in a traffic collision a month before release. Thus, the film was dedicated in Linetsky's memory.

Annie Bovaird was cast to replace Linetsky as the voice of Caillou.

== Soundtrack ==
Caillou's Holiday Movie Soundtrack

Soundtrack album by Various artists
- Released: December 14, 2010 (Canada)
- Genre: Soundtrack
- Label: Universal
- Producer: Jeffrey Zahn

The soundtrack was released in Canada on December 14, 2010, featuring 18 songs. Amongst the several songs performed by the cast of the film are "Where Christmas is Not the Same" and "Eight Days to Go". One of the film's songs, "Everyday", was performed by French-Canadian artist Marilou. The score was composed by Jeffrey Zahn, but it wasn't featured in the soundtrack.

The soundtrack is available on the Canadian iTunes Store.

== Reception ==
Mark Van Hook of DVD Verdict concluded the film is "inoffensive but bland", adding: "recommending it only to young children". DVD Talk said the film contained "positive messages" and that its "image quality" was "excellent".

== Home media ==
Warner Home Video released the film on VHS and DVD in the United States on October 7, 2003. The special features in the DVD include: an animated interview with Caillou; more holiday songs; the read-along of The Night Before Christmas; and six Caillou challenges. The film was presented in full screen as well as in 2.0 Stereo audio; in either English, French or Spanish.

The Canadian release from Sony Wonder, released on October 28, 2003, contains French, English and Spanish voicetracks as with the US release; its DVD bonus features are two games and two sing-alongs.

The film was re-released by NCircle Entertainment and DHX Media (as part of the 27th anniversary of Caillou) on November 11, 2014.

== See also ==
- List of Christmas films
