= Christine L'Heureux =

Canadian educator, author, and publisher

Hélène Desputeaux
- Born: September 9, 1946 (age 80)
- Occupation: Illustrator
- Notable work: Caillou (1989–present)

Christine L'Heureux (French pronunciation: [kʁistin løʁø]) is a Canadian educator, author, and publisher who, with illustrator Hélène Desputeaux, created Caillou, a successful series of children's books that later spawned an animated television series with the same name in 1997.
