= Annie Bovaird =

Canadian actress

- Born: Lindsay Anne Bovaird; February 28, 1992 (age 34); Montreal, Quebec, Canada
- Occupation: Actress
- Years active: 2001–2014

Lindsay Anne Bovaird (born February 28, 1992) is a Canadian former actress best known for voicing the title character in the animated TV series Caillou. She also voiced Elsa in Creepschool, Zaza in Dragon Hunters, Denim Farqueson in The Tournament, and Juju in Potatoes and Dragons.

== Early life ==
Bovaird was born in Montreal, the youngest of two daughters to Roslyn (née Rowat) and Terry Bovaird.

== Filmography ==
Year	Title	Role	Note
2003	Caillou's Holiday Movie	Caillou	Voice
2004	Saving Emily	Emily	Television film
2004	Daniel and the Superdogs	April	Voice
2005–2014	Yakari	Additional voices	
2006–2010	Caillou	Caillou (Seasons 4–5)	Voice
2006–2009	Monster Allergy	Elena Potato	Voice
2007	Christie's Revenge	Hailey Colton	Television film
