= List of Caillou episodes =

Caillou has produced a total of original 92 half-hour episodes (original 345 five-minute segments) aired by Teletoon from 1997 to 2009 and Treehouse TV from 2009 to 2017 in Canada. Sometimes aired PBS Kids in the United States, it produced a total of 144 half-hour episodes (598 five-minute segments) from 2000 to 2020 in 20 years, as well as the separate 90-minute children's film Caillou's Holiday Movie (2003).

From November 24, 2016, the first revival series, known as Caillou's New Adventures, premiered, producing a total of 30 half-hour episodes (original 150 five-minute segments) per five seasons until August 18, 2023.

The second and most recent revival utilizes the 3D computer animation medium instead of the previous 2D Flash animation. Five 45-minute specials were released between July and December 2022. The 52, eleven-minute episodes were made available to stream on Peacock since February 15, 2024.

== Series overview ==
Season	Segments	Episodes	Originally released		
Season	Segments	Episodes	First released	Last released	Network
1	65	13	September 15, 1997	November 18, 1997	Canada: Teletoon and Télétoon (1997) US: PBS Kids (2000)
2	80	20	August 26, 2000	October 13, 2000	Canada: Teletoon and Télétoon (2000) US: PBS Kids (2003)
3	62	13	January 12, 2002	March 31, 2002	Canada: Teletoon and Télétoon (2002) US: PBS Kids (2006)
4	60	20	April 1, 2006	August 23, 2006	Canada: Teletoon and Télétoon (2006) US: PBS Kids (2006)
5	78	26	September 11, 2010	April 17, 2011	Canada: Treehouse TV (2010–11) US: PBS Kids (2013)

=== First revival: Caillou's New Adventures ===
Season	Segments	Episodes	Originally released	
Season	Segments	Episodes	First released	Last released
6	30	6	November 24, 2016	September 4, 2018
7	30	6	June 1, 2018	July 19, 2019
8	30	6	August 2, 2019	August 21, 2020
9	30	6	October 31, 2020	December 31, 2021
10	30	6	June 10, 2022	August 18, 2023

=== Second revival: Caillou ===
Season	Segments	Episodes	Originally released		
Season	Segments	Episodes	First released	Last released	Network
11	52	26	February 15, 2024	December 5, 2024	US: Peacock (2024)

== Original series ==
=== Season 1 (1997) ===
No. overall	No. in season	Title	Teletoon airdate	Prod. code	PBS Kids episode order
1a	1a	"Caillou Makes Cookies"	September 15, 1997 September 12, 2000 (Caillou Cooks)	101a	107c
Caillou is having fun being noisy, but his Mommy asks him to be quiet so Rosie can have her nap, and feels hungry and attempts to make cookies, to problematic results.
1b	1b	"Caillou Isn't Afraid Anymore"	September 16, 1997	101b	TBA
Caillou believes that his neighbor, Mr. Hinkle, and his house are scary. Caillou finally becomes friends with Mr. Hinkle after a game of hide and seek.
1c	1c	"Caillou Hates Vegetables"	September 17, 1997	101c	108b
Caillou refuses to eat vegetables and wants to eat chocolate chip cookies for lunch. A walk in the park with Grandpa changes his mind
1d	1d	"Caillou's All Alone"	September 18, 1997	101d	TBA
Caillou tries to find somebody to play with, but everyone is too busy.
1e	1e	"Caillou Tidies His Toys"	September 19, 1997	101e	TBA
Caillou has left his toys all around the house and must pick them up.
2a	2a	"Caillou Learns to Drive"	September 20, 1997	102a	109c
When playing with his toys, Caillou imagines what it would be like to drive a car.
2b	2b	"Caillou at Daycare"	September 21, 1997	102b	TBA
It's Caillou's first day at daycare and he really doesn't want to go.
2c	2c	"Caillou Joins the Circus"	September 22, 1997	102c	TBA
Following a dream, Caillou gets mistaken that the circus is today and throws a tantrum in response. He calms down and pretends he's marching in a circus with Daddy and Rosie.
2d	2d	"Caillou is Afraid of the Dark"	September 23, 1997	102d	TBA
Caillou believes that bedtime monsters are real, and he is afraid to sleep at night.
2e	2e	"Caillou's Friends"	September 24, 1997	102e	TBA
While looking through a photo album with Grandma, Caillou discovers that he can be friends with anybody.
3a	3a	"Caillou Visits the Doctor"	September 25, 1997	103a	103c
Caillou goes to the doctor for an ear test, and worries that the doctor will make his ear hurt.
3b	3b	"Big Brother Caillou"	September 26, 1997	103b	TBA
2 and a half-year-old Caillou gets jealous when Mommy and Daddy bring home his new baby sister, Rosie.
3c	3c	"Caillou Goes Shopping"	September 27, 1997	103c	TBA
It's a busy day: First of all it's snowing and Caillou is looking forward to making a snowman, but then Caillou goes out to the supermarket with Mommy and Rosie, but he gets himself lost.
3d	3d	"Caillou in the Bathtub"	September 28, 1997	103d	TBA
Caillou is hesitant to have a bath, but Mommy and Daddy soon solve the issue.
3e	3e	"Caillou Gets Dressed"	September 29, 1997	103e	TBA
With his clothes in the wash, Caillou dresses up in fancy clothes.
4a	4a	"Caillou's Teddy Shirt"	September 30, 1997	104a	TBA
While playing a ramp game with his race cars, Caillou sees Rosie wearing his favorite baby shirt and demands he have it on as well, but because it's too small, Caillou is sad. Mommy helps Caillou put it on his stuffed teddy bear
4b	4b	"Caillou Goes Around the Block"	October 1, 1997	104b	TBA
Caillou takes a walk around the neighborhood by himself and meets Sarah, one of his neighbors.
4c	4c	"Caillou's Hiding Place"	October 2, 1997	104c	TBA
Caillou discovers a hollow interior inside a tree at Grandma and Grandpa's house.
4d	4d	"Caillou's Birthday Present"	October 3, 1997	104d	TBA
It's Caillou's fourth birthday and he's having a little party, and he is very excited about the day.
4e	4e	"Caillou and Gilbert"	October 4, 1997 September 7, 2000 (Pets!)	104e	104d
Caillou attempts to play his favorite games with Gilbert, but discovers he prefers his own kitty games.
5a	5a	"Caillou's Summer Goodnight"	October 5, 1997	105a	TBA
Caillou has trouble sleeping as it's still light outside, but Grandma helps pass the time.
5b	5b	"Caillou is Scared of Dogs"	October 6, 1997 September 13, 2000 (Puppy Love!)	105b	110a
After a dog barks at him, Caillou is quite fearful – but when he meets Grandma's sister's Dog, Rover, he discovers that they are wonderful pets.
5c	5c	"Caillou Goes to the Zoo"	October 7, 1997	105c	TBA
Caillou spends a family day out at the Zoo and befriends a monkey.
5d	5d	"Caillou's Rainy Day"	October 8, 1997	105d	TBA
Caillou enjoys splashing in rain puddles during a rainy day.
5e	5e	"Caillou at the Beach"	October 9, 1997 September 5, 2000 (Summertime!)	105e	102a
Caillou and his family are spending the day at the beach for the first time and discovers all the sea creatures living there.
6a	6a	"Caillou's New Shoes"	October 10, 1997	106a	TBA
Caillou buys a set of Running Shoes with Mommy.
6b	6b	"Caillou's Snowman"	October 11, 1997	106b	TBA
Sarah teaches Caillou how to make a snowman, but he would rather play with snowballs.
6c	6c	"Caillou is a Clown"	October 12, 1997	106c	TBA
Caillou helps Rosie conquer her fear of Clowns by dressing up as one and acting silly.
6d	6d	"Caillou's Special Friend"	October 13, 1997	106d	TBA
Caillou uses his imagination to think up someone to play with.
6e	6e	"Caillou Rakes the Leaves"	October 14, 1997	106e	TBA
Caillou and Rosie are playing outside and have fun playing in the autumn leaves.
7a	7a	"Caillou's Big Friend"	October 15, 1997	107a	TBA
Caillou meets a taller boy named Andre, who makes him cry when he accidentally sits and breaks Caillou's favorite chair.
7b	7b	"Caillou's Colours"	October 16, 1997 September 9, 2000	107b	106c
At Grandma's house, Caillou paints a special picture.
7c	7c	"Caillou Mails a Letter"	October 17, 1997	107c	TBA
Daddy and Caillou make a special letter for Mommy because Mommy is receiving too much bills.
7d	7d	"Caillou Goes Camping"	October 18, 1997	107d	TBA
Grandpa tells Caillou about the time when his Daddy was a little boy and they went on a camping trip.
7e	7e	"Caillou Learns to Swim"	October 19, 1997	107e	TBA
Caillou is afraid of the water, but Daddy teaches him how to swim and he is now fearless.
8a	8a	"Caillou's New Babysitter"	October 20, 1997	108a	TBA
Caillou's parents go out to dinner, and he and Rosie are introduced to Julie, their new babysitter.
8b	8b	"Caillou Learns to Skate"	October 21, 1997	108b	TBA
After being interested in a hockey game, Caillou wants to try ice skating but finds it more difficult than he imagined.
8c	8c	"Caillou Makes a New Friend"	October 22, 1997	108c	TBA
Grandpa takes Caillou to the park and meets a boy named Jim.
8d	8d	"Caillou and Daddy"	October 23, 1997	108d	TBA
Caillou and his Daddy make a special present for Mommy.
8e	8e	"Caillou Grows Carrots"	October 24, 1997 September 11, 2000	108e	108c
Grandpa teaches Caillou how to grow carrots.
9a	9a	"Caillou Goes to a Theme Park"	October 25, 1997 September 5, 2000	109a	102d
Caillou and his family visit a theme park and ride the Niagara Falls ride with Daddy
9b	9b	"Caillou's School Bus"	October 26, 1997	109b	101d
Caillou pretends to go to school on a school bus.
9c	9c	"Caillou Looks for Gilbert"	October 27, 1997	109c	104c
Caillou is having a game of dinosaur hunter with Gilbert the cat, but he doesn't know where he went and starts looking.
9d	9d	"Caillou's Surprise Breakfast"	October 28, 1997	109d	107d
Caillou gets up early to make a special breakfast with his mom and dad.
9e	9e	"Caillou's Missing Sock"	October 29, 1997	109e	TBA
Caillou loses his sock while in his room.
10a	10a	"Caillou Goes to Work"	October 30, 1997	110a	TBA
Mommy takes Caillou for a day at her workplace.
10b	10b	"Caillou's Quarrel"	October 31, 1997	110b	TBA
Caillou has a quarrel with Clementine because they don't want to play the same games.
10c	10c	"Caillou's Getting Older"	November 1, 1997	110c	101b
Caillou and Daddy find a dead bird in the backyard, and Caillou gets worried about getting old and dying.
10d	10d	"Caillou's Big Slide"	November 2, 1997	110d	TBA
Caillou is playing in the park with Clementine. While in the park with Clementine, Caillou is afraid to go down the tall slide.
10e	10e	"Caillou Walks a Dog"	November 3, 1997 September 13, 2000 (Puppy Love!)	110e	110d
Caillou helps Grandma walk Rover the Dog and learns how dogs like him get exercise.
11a	11a	"Caillou Watches Rosie"	November 4, 1997	111a	TBA
Mommy has a headache and needs to rest, so Caillou watches over Rosie, but Rosie draws on the walls, making Caillou mad, take away the crayons and cause Rosie to throw a tantrum.
11b	11b	"Caillou Gets Sick"	November 5, 1997	111b	103d
Caillou has to stay at home because he has chickenpox, but spreads it to Rosie.
11c	11c	"Caillou's Phone Call"	November 6, 1997	111c	TBA
Caillou's phone book is torn up by Rosie.
11d	11d	"Caillou Sleeps Over"	November 7, 1997	111d	TBA
Caillou sleeps over with Leo for the first time.
11e	11e	"Caillou Plays Baby"	November 8, 1997	111e	105d
Caillou decides what being a baby, like Rosie, is like.
12a	12a	"Caillou Flies on a Plane"	November 9, 1997	112a	109d
Caillou, Mommy, and Daddy are going on their first airplane ride.
12b	12b	"Rosie Bothers Caillou"	November 10, 1997	112b	TBA
Rosie unknowingly annoys Caillou when he wants to be alone.
12c	12c	"Caillou Goes Birdwatching"	November 11, 1997	112c	TBA
Caillou and Grandma go Birdwatching.
12d	12d	"Caillou and the Doll"	November 12, 1997	112d	TBA
Caillou plays with Rosie's doll and then gets it covered with makeup.
12e	12e	"Caillou Hurts Himself"	November 13, 1997	112e	TBA
Caillou falls off his bike while at the park with Daddy.
13a	13a	"Caillou's Big Kick"	November 14, 1997	113a	TBA
Caillou's big friend André has come to visit. André's a soccer player and Caillou wants to play too for the first time.
13b	13b	"Caillou the Jungle Explorer"	November 15, 1997	113b	TBA
Caillou explores the garden and imagines he is a jungle explorer.
13c	13c	"The Caillou Show"	November 16, 1997 September 9, 2000 (Caillou Creates!)	113c	106d
Caillou's playgroup put on a play about watering flowers.
13d	13d	"Caillou Loves Halloween"	November 17, 1997	113d	TBA
Caillou goes out Trick-or-Treating with his friends.
13e	13e	"Caillou's Picnic"	November 18, 1997	113e	TBA
Leo tags along with Caillou on a family picnic in the forest and imagines being brave knights.

=== Season 2 (2000) ===
No. overall	No. in season	Title	Teletoon airdate (top) PBS Kids airdate (bottom)	Prod. code	PBS Kids episode order
14a	1a	"Star Light, Star Bright"	August 26, 2000	201a	TBA
Caillou wants to see a shooting star, but he keeps missing it, which he imagines.
14b	1b	"All in a Day's Work"	August 26, 2000 September 4, 2000 (When I Grow Up...)	201b	101c
The family is in a rush after over-sleeping. Caillou and Daddy walk to play group, seeing many different people and the jobs they do.
14c	1c	"The Cat's Meow"	August 26, 2000 September 7, 2000 (Pets!)	201c	104a
It's Gilbert's check-up day, and Caillou and Daddy struggle to get him to the vet.
14d	1d	"Caillou in Space"	August 26, 2000	201d	TBA
Caillou and Leo visit a planetarium and learn all about space.
15a	2a	"The Treasure Chest"	August 27, 2000 September 4, 2000 (When I Grow Up...)	202a	101a
Caillou finds all kinds of treasures while in the attic.
15b	2b	"A Camping We Will Go!"	August 27, 2000 September 5, 2000 (Summertime!)	202b	102b
Caillou and his family go on a camping trip for a weekend.
15c	2c	"Chopsticks"	August 27, 2000 September 11, 2000 (Food-a-Licious!)	202c	108d
Caillou stays for dinner at Sarah's house, trying Chinese food for the first time and learning to eat with chopsticks.
15d	2d	"A Special Dog"	August 27, 2000 September 13, 2000 (Puppy Love!)	202d	110c
Caillou and Mommy go to the park and meet Barbara, and old friend of Mommy's who is blind, and uses a guide dog. Caillou learns that not just people have jobs-dogs can too!
16a	3a	"Caillou Beats the Heat"	August 28, 2000 September 5, 2000 (Summertime!)	203a	102c
Caillou is sad that he and his family can't go to the pool, so they decide to have fun in the backyard.
16b	3b	"Back Seat Driver"	August 28, 2000 September 8, 2000 (My Sister Rosie)	203b	105b
While going to meet Mommy at a restaurant, Daddy and the kids end up having car troubles.
16c	3c	"Lost and Found (1)"	August 28, 2000 September 13, 2000 (Puppy Love!)	203c	110b
Caillou and Daddy find a missing dog at the park.
16d	3d	"Holiday Magic"	August 28, 2000	203d	TBA
Caillou and his family go to the mall to see Santa and then plan to go get a Christmas tree.
17a	4a	"Downhill From Here"	August 29, 2000	204a	TBA
Mom, an avid skier, takes Caillou downhill skiing for the first time while Dad and Rosie sit in the cozy chalet and watch.
17b	4b	"Next Stop Fun"	August 29, 2000 September 12, 2000 (Traveling!)	204b	109b
Caillou rides a train for the first time.
17c	4c	"Under Sail"	August 29, 2000 September 12, 2000 (Traveling!)	204c	109a
Caillou and his family go to visit a family friend named Helen, and take a ride on her boat.
17d	4d	"Farmer Caillou"	August 29, 2000 September 11, 2000 (Food-a-Licious!)	204d	108a
Caillou goes with Mr. Hinkle to his family farm for the first time.
18a	5a	"Sunday Brunch"	August 30, 2000	205a	TBA
It's Mother's Day and the family goes to a buffet for brunch.
18b	5b	"Caillou to the Rescue"	August 30, 2000 September 7, 2000 (Pets!)	205b	104b
Caillou visits a fire station after Gilbert gets stuck in a tree, and fire fighters come to the rescue.
18c	5c	"Caillou's Top Bunk"	August 30, 2000 September 8, 2000 (My Sister Rosie)	205c	105c
Caillou and Rosie sleep in a bunk bed while at Grandma and Grandpa's.
18d	5d	"Recipe for Fun"	August 30, 2000 September 10, 2000 (Caillou Cooks!)	205d	107b
After forgetting his toys in the car, Caillou learns how to paint with potatoes with Grandma.
19a	6a	"New Kids on the Block"	August 30, 2000	206a	TBA
New neighbors move into a new house. Caillou doesn't make just one friend, he makes two- a set of twins!
19b	6b	"Caillou Goes to School"	August 30, 2000	206b	TBA
Caillou goes to school with Sarah on a special day.
19c	6c	"Caillou's Kitchen"	August 30, 2000 September 10, 2000 (Caillou Cooks!)	206c	107a
Caillou, Sarah and Rosie make their own meal while the grown-ups are busy making dinner.
19d	6d	"Caillou's Sea Adventure"	August 30, 2000	206d	TBA
20a	7a	"The Little Bird"	August 31, 2000	207a	TBA
Caillou and Sarah find an injured bird in the backyard, and help nurse it back to health.
20b	7b	"Lights Out!"	August 31, 2000	207b	TBA
A snowstorm knocks the power out, so Caillou and his family must do without for the night.
20c	7c	"Caillou's Check Up"	August 31, 2000 September 6, 2000 (I'm All Better!)	207c	103a
Caillou is scared to visit the dentist.
20d	7d	"Calling Dr. Caillou"	August 31, 2000 September 6, 2000 (I'm All Better!)	207d	103b
Caillou is looking forward to a special day at work with Dad, but Dad feels sick and has to stay home.
21a	8a	"Pumpkin Patch Kid"	August 31, 2000	208a	TBA
Caillou and Grandpa go to a pumpkin patch to pick out pumpkins for Jack-O-Lanterns.
21b	8b	"Caillou's Got Rhythms"	August 31, 2000 September 9, 2000 (Caillou Creates!)	208b	106b
Inspired by a music group at the park, Caillou, Rosie and Grandma make their own instruments to play.
21c	8c	"Do It Yourself!"	August 31, 2000 September 9, 2000 (Caillou Creates!)	208c	106a
Caillou wants to make a present for his Daddy all by himself, so Grandpa shows him how to make paper hats.
21d	8d	"Caillou's Big Sale"	August 31, 2000	208d	TBA
The neighborhood is having a garage sale and Caillou decides to join in.
22a	9a	"One, Two, Boom!"	September 1, 2000	209a	TBA
A loud thunderstorm scares Caillou, so Daddy teaches him a special game to make it less scary.
22b	9b	"Out of the Woods"	September 1, 2000	209b	TBA
Caillou goes with Leo, Clementine and Ms. Martin on a field trip to the woods.
22c	9c	"House Paint"	September 1, 2000	209c	TBA
22d	9d	"Caillou's Thanksgiving"	September 1, 2000	209d	TBA
23a	10a	"Say Cheese!"	September 1, 2000	210a	TBA
Daddy gives Caillou his old camera, and shows him how to take photos with it.
23b	10b	"Finders Keepers"	September 1, 2000	210b	TBA
Caillou and Leo go looking for Caillou's toy airplane and end up finding various lost items around the house.
23c	10c	"A Frog in Caillou's Throat"	September 1, 2000	210c	TBA
Caillou gets sick from playing out in the rain and must spend the day not talking to rest his sore throat.
23d	10d	"Caillou the Great"	September 1, 2000	210d	TBA
Caillou goes to Leo's birthday party and wants to be a magician.
24a	11a	"Clowning Around"	September 11, 2000	211a	TBA
Grandma and Caillou make their own clown puppets.
24b	11b	"Read All About It!"	September 11, 2000	211b	TBA
Caillou and his Mommy visit the library. He checks out some books and becomes worried when he accidentally draws on them.
24c	11c	"Mom for a Day"	September 11, 2000 September 8, 2000 (My Sister Rosie)	211c	105a
Doris leaves for work, leaving Boris and Caillou to take over for her around the house.
24d	11d	"Caillou Plays Baseball"	September 11, 2000	211d	TBA
25a	12a	"Comic Caper!"	September 11, 2000	212a	TBA
25b	12b	"Hide and Seek"	September 11, 2000	212b	TBA
Caillou doesn't want to play with his sister, but ends up accidentally playing a fun game of hide-and-seek with her.
25c	12c	"Caillou's Clouds"	September 11, 2000	212c	TBA
Caillou imagines in the clouds while he is waiting to fly his kite.
25d	12d	"Caillou Cleans Up"	September 11, 2000	212d	TBA
26a	13a	"Caillou and the Tooth Fairy"	September 12, 2000	213a	TBA
26b	13b	"I Want to Grow Up!"	September 12, 2000	213b	TBA
Caillou wishes that he was bigger, like his older friend, André. However, he finds out that being small is just fine, and he has years to grow.
26c	13c	"Caillou's Big Chill"	September 12, 2000	213c	TBA
26d	13d	"Leo's Hamster"	September 12, 2000	213d	TBA
Caillou is responsible for caring for Leo's hamster while he and his parents are away.
27a	14a	"Three's a Crowd"	September 12, 2000	214a	TBA
Caillou accidentally breaks Clementine's bucket while playing and is excluded by her and Leo while they play.
27b	14b	"Get Well Soon"	September 12, 2000	214b	TBA
When Leo accidentally breaks his toe while playing, Caillou decides to make him a get well card.
27c	14c	"Shadow Play"	September 12, 2000	214c	TBA
27d	14d	"A New Member of the Family"	September 12, 2000	214d	TBA
While looking at old photos, Mommy, Caillou and Rosie remember the day Gilbert the cat first came home.
28a	15a	"Surprise Party"	September 13, 2000	215a	TBA
28b	15b	"Caillou's Bad Dream"	September 13, 2000	215b	TBA
Caillou has a bad dream and is too scared to go back to sleep.
28c	15c	"Caillou Computes"	September 13, 2000	215c	TBA
Daddy brings home a new computer for the family.
28d	15d	"Caillou's Big Discovery"	September 13, 2000	215d	TBA
29a	16a	"Caillou Goes to the Car Wash"	September 13, 2000	216a	TBA
The car is dirty, so Daddy and the kids go to the car wash. Rosie is scared, but Caillou calms her down and shows her how fun the carwash is.
29b	16b	"Far Away Home!"	September 13, 2000	216b	TBA
29c	16c	"All You Can Eat"	September 13, 2000	216c	TBA
29d	16d	"Caillou Stays Up Late"	September 13, 2000	216d	TBA
Mommy and Daddy are having a dinner party and Caillou is upset that he can't join in.
30a	17a	"Backyard Zoo"	October 12, 2000	217a	TBA
30b	17b	"Caillou's Scavenger Hunt"	October 12, 2000	217b	TBA
30c	17c	"Too Many Cooks"	October 12, 2000	217c	TBA
When Julie is running late to babysit, Caillou asks Mr. Hinkle to babysit. Soon, Mr. Hinkle, Ms. Martin and Julie are all there to babysit the kids and they all bake a cake.
30d	17d	"The Berry Patch"	October 12, 2000	217d	TBA
Caillou joins Clementine and her family to go strawberry picking.
31a	18a	"Caillou's Suitcase"	October 12, 2000	218a	TBA
Caillou packs his own suitcase for a weekend trip with his family, but he doesn't know what to bring, overpacking in the process.
31b	18b	"Try, Try Again"	October 12, 2000	218b	TBA
Caillou struggles to learn to tie his shoes, but learns practice makes perfect.
31c	18c	"The New Leaf"	October 12, 2000	218c	TBA
31d	18d	"Happy New Year"	October 12, 2000	218d	TBA
Caillou joins Sarah and her family in celebrating Chinese New Year.
32a	19a	"Caillou's Cross Word"	October 13, 2000	219a	TBA
Caillou and Leo learn a mean word from an older kid, not knowing that it can hurt people's feelings.
32b	19b	"Caillou Meets Robbie"	October 13, 2000	219b	TBA
At the park, Caillou meets Robbie, a deaf boy. Caillou learns that the two can still play, despite their differences.
32c	19c	"The Piñata"	October 13, 2000	219c	TBA
32d	19d	"Caillou's Promise"	October 13, 2000	219d	TBA
Caillou learns about promises and how important it is not to break one.
33a	20a	"A Surprise for Mommy"	October 13, 2000	220a	TBA
33b	20b	"Caillou Misses Sarah"	October 13, 2000	220b	TBA
Caillou and his family housesit for Sarah's family while they're on vacation in China.
33c	20c	"T-Shirt Trouble"	October 13, 2000	220c	TBA
After spilling grape juice on his new shirt, Caillou learns about 'recycling' from Grandma, turning his stained shirt into a unique tie-dye.
33d	20d	"A Helping Hand"	October 13, 2000	220d	TBA

=== Season 3 (2002) ===
No. overall	No. in season	Title	Original release date	Prod. code
34a	1a	"Caillou Tries Karate"	January 12, 2002	301a
Sarah shows Caillou and Leo some karate.
34b	1b	"Just Like Daddy"	January 12, 2002	301b
Mommy and Rosie go out to run errands, and Caillou helps Daddy around the house with various chores.
34c	1c	"Caillou's Safari"	January 12, 2002	301c
Rosie leaves Caillou's animal cards around the house, turning the hunt into a 'safari' to see the various animals.
34d	1d	"Cowboy Caillou"	January 12, 2002	301d
Caillou and his family go visit Daddy's childhood friend, Jonas, on his farm.
35a	2a	"Caillou's Coins"	January 13, 2002	302a
Caillou and Mommy go to the store.
35b	2b	"Caillou's Canoe Trip"	January 13, 2002	302b
Caillou, Daddy, and Grandpa are going on a camping trip, taking a canoe to get to the cabin.
35c	2c	"Caillou and the Bulldozer"	January 13, 2002	302c
35d	2d	"Caillou the Firefighter"	January 13, 2002	302d
35e	2e	"Caillou the Timekeeper"	January 13, 2002	302e
Eager to go on a picnic, Caillou keeps himself busy by keeping watch of a timer.
36a	3a	"Elephants"	January 20, 2002	303a
36b	3b	"Caillou and the Sheep"	January 20, 2002	303b
36c	3c	"Caillou and the Puppies"	January 20, 2002	303c
36d	3d	"The Duck Family"	January 20, 2002	303d
36e	3e	"Clementine's New Pet"	January 20, 2002	303e
37a	4a	"Disappearing Carrots"	January 27, 2002	304a
37b	4b	"Caillou Marches On"	January 27, 2002	304b
37c	4c	"Who's Mooing?"	January 27, 2002	304c
37d	4d	"Follow That Sound"	January 27, 2002	304d
37e	4e	"Music Box!"	January 27, 2002	304e
38a	5a	"Caillou's Gym Day"	February 3, 2002	305a
38b	5b	"Our Rocketship"	February 3, 2002	305b
38c	5c	"Caillou Helps Grandpa"	February 3, 2002	305c
38d	5d	"Backyard Bowlers"	February 3, 2002	305d
38e	5e	"Caillou's Milk Run"	February 3, 2002	305e
Caillou and Mommy go to the store on an early morning milk run.
39a	6a	"Dancing at Grandma's"	February 10, 2002	306a
39b	6b	"Mystery Valentine"	February 10, 2002	306b
39c	6c	"Play Ball!"	February 10, 2002	306c
39d	6d	"Dogsled Ahead!"	February 10, 2002	306d
40a	7a	"Caillou's Sleepover Guest"	February 17, 2002	307a
40b	7b	"Games in the Park"	February 17, 2002	307b
40c	7c	"The Sugar Shack"	February 17, 2002	307c
40d	7d	"Winter Mystery"	February 17, 2002	307d
40e	7e	"Caillou's Snow Day"	February 17, 2002	307e
41a	8a	"Caillou's Favorite Plate"	February 24, 2002	308a
Caillou is given a space-themed plate from his Grandma. He wants to use it for every meal, until it goes missing one afternoon.
41b	8b	"Fun in the Mud"	February 24, 2002	308b
41c	8c	"All Aboard!"	February 24, 2002	308c
41d	8d	"Gilbert's House"	February 24, 2002	308d
41e	8e	"I Scream for Ice Cream!"	February 24, 2002	308e
42a	9a	"Super Caillou"	March 3, 2002	309a
42b	9b	"Trip on the Subway"	March 3, 2002	309b
42c	9c	"Caillou's Race"	March 3, 2002	309c
42d	9d	"As Good As New"	March 3, 2002	309d
42e	9e	"I, Robot"	March 3, 2002	309e
43a	10a	"Caillou's Water Park"	March 10, 2002	310a
43b	10b	"Gone Fishing"	March 10, 2002	310b
43c	10c	"The Water Goes 'Round'"	March 10, 2002	310c
43d	10d	"Caillou's Test Drive"	March 10, 2002	310d
43e	10e	"A Very Good Swimmer"	March 10, 2002	310e
44a	11a	"Caillou's Horn"	March 17, 2002	311a
Caillou's friend Sarah gives him an old toy horn. He learns that there's a time and place to use things.
44b	11b	"The Mighty Oak"	March 17, 2002	311b
44c	11c	"Get Well, Mr. Hinkle"	March 17, 2002	311c
44d	11d	"The Big Boat!"	March 17, 2002	311d
45a	12a	"Something for Everyone"	March 24, 2002	312a
45b	12b	"Skating Lessons"	March 24, 2002	312b
45c	12c	"Caillou Becomes a Waiter"	March 24, 2002	312c
45d	12d	"Sticking to It!"	March 24, 2002	312d
45e	12e	"New Clothes"	March 24, 2002	312e
46a	13a	"Where I Live"	March 31, 2002	313a
46b	13b	"A Good Friend"	March 31, 2002	313b
46c	13c	"Just Like Me"	March 31, 2002	313c
46d	13d	"Just in Time"	March 31, 2002	313d
46e	13e	"Mr. Fixit"	March 31, 2002	313e
Caillou helps a maintenance man fix the washing machine. Then, he looks for other things around the house that need fixing.

=== Season 4 (2006) ===
No. overall	No. in season	Title	Original release date	Prod. code
47a	1a	"Where's Gilbert?"	April 1, 2006	401a
Caillou is outside playing with Gilbert and Grandpa, which leads to Sarah's cat, Ollie, find Gilbert's yarn until he sees it.
47b	1b	"Where I Saw It Last"	April 1, 2006	401b
47c	1c	"Lost in the Jungle"	April 1, 2006	401c
It seems Gilbert hides, Caillou goes to playschool for Ms. Martin's class to learn about animal sounds. In the end that Caillou finds Gilbert before the storm comes and caught in the muddy footprints went this way.
48a	2a	"Caillou and the Big Slide"	April 3, 2006	405a
48b	2b	"Caillou the Sailor"	April 3, 2006	405b
Caillou and Rosie wonder what Grandpa acts pirates usually to set sail on the ship, which he commands to use a telescope to see better.
48c	2c	"Caillou and the Creepy Crawlies"	April 3, 2006	405c
49a	3a	"Caillou of the Antarctic"	April 4, 2006	409a
While playing outside, Jeffrey accidentally falls on Caillou, eventually it doesn't trip over the ground. Meanwhile, Jason and Jeffrey learn about Antarctica.
49b	3b	"Deep Sea Caillou"	April 4, 2006	409b
Caillou and his friends introduce our new Chinese student Lee-Wun, along with learning about feeding fish.
49c	3c	"Caillou in the Bayou"	April 4, 2006	409c
50a	4a	"Everyone's Best"	April 5, 2006	402a
50b	4b	"Stronger Every Day"	April 5, 2006	402b
50c	4c	"No More Training Wheels"	April 5, 2006	402c
51a	5a	"Caillou Plays the Drums"	April 6, 2006	407a
51b	5b	"Caillou's Marching Band"	April 6, 2006	407b
51c	5c	"Caillou Sings"	April 6, 2006	407c
52a	6a	"Caillou Helps Out"	April 7, 2006	404a
52b	6b	"Caillou the Firefighter"	April 7, 2006	404b
52c	6c	"Caillou to the Rescue"	April 7, 2006	404c
53a	7a	"Caillou the Road Builder"	April 26, 2006	403a
53b	7b	"Caillou's Building Adventure"	April 26, 2006	403b
The episode starts out with Caillou and Mommy making sandwiches. Grandpa, Daddy, and Rosie come into the kitchen and Daddy says it looks like a Caillou's sandwich ever made, then Daddy puts it in the box. Grandpa looks at his watch and says they better leave cause a lot of people are going to build a house with cement to have a handprint.
53c	7c	"A House in the Sky"	April 26, 2006	403c
54a	8a	"Snowflakes"	May 17, 2006	406a
54b	8b	"Caillou Shoots! He Scores!"	May 17, 2006	406b
54c	8c	"Caillou Goes Tobogganing"	May 17, 2006	406c
55a	9a	"Show and Tell"	May 31, 2006	408a
55b	9b	"Caillou the Magician"	May 31, 2006	408b
55c	9c	"Caillou's Castle"	May 31, 2006	408c
56a	10a	"Magnet Madness"	June 14, 2006	410a
56b	10b	"Caillou the Dinosaur Hunter"	June 14, 2006	410b
56c	10c	"Caillou the Astronaut"	June 14, 2006	410c
57a	11a	"Caillou the Librarian"	June 21, 2006	411a
57b	11b	"Caillou the Bookworm"	June 21, 2006	411b
57c	11c	"Caillou the Storyteller"	June 21, 2006	411c
58a	12a	"A Present for Mommy"	June 28, 2006	412a
58b	12b	"Caillou the Chef"	June 28, 2006	412b
58c	12c	"Caillou the Painter"	June 28, 2006	412c
59a	13a	"Captain Caillou"	July 5, 2006	413a
59b	13b	"The Loudest Noise"	July 5, 2006	413b
59c	13c	"Caillou's First Wedding"	July 5, 2006	413c
60a	14a	"Caillou Goes Shopping"	July 12, 2006	414a
60b	14b	"Caillou Goes Apple Picking"	July 12, 2006	414b
60c	14c	"Caillou's Halloween Costume"	July 12, 2006	414c
61a	15a	"Shoo, Shoo Bird, Fly Away!"	July 19, 2006	415a
61b	15b	"Caillou's Road Trip"	July 19, 2006	415b
61c	15c	"Caillou and the Dragon"	July 19, 2006	415c
62a	16a	"Caillou's Surprise"	July 26, 2006	416a
Caillou accidentally breaks a cup, but Grandma shows him pottery to make a new cup.
62b	16b	"A Surprise for Miss Martin"	July 26, 2006	416b
62c	16c	"A Surprise Sleepover"	July 26, 2006	416c
63a	17a	"Caillou the Patient"	August 2, 2006	417a
Caillou and his family walked up to the park, while Caillou and Leo freaks out that his body caused problems and malfunctioned so both went to the doctor's.
63b	17b	"Caillou the Police Officer"	August 2, 2006	417b
63c	17c	"Grandpa's Friend"	August 2, 2006	417c
64a	18a	"Caillou Goes Caroling"	August 9, 2006	418a
64b	18b	"A Playschool Party"	August 9, 2006	418b
64c	18c	"Caillou's Christmas Eve"	August 9, 2006	418c
65a	19a	"Caillou's Valentines"	August 16, 2006	419a
65b	19b	"Hello Spring!"	August 16, 2006	419b
65c	19c	"Caillou's April Fool"	August 16, 2006	419c
66a	20a	"A Sweet and Sour Day"	August 23, 2006	420a
66b	20b	"Caillou's Puppet Show"	August 23, 2006	420b
Caillou receives puppets to make a puppet show for everyone.
66c	20c	"Caillou's Collection"	August 23, 2006	420c

=== Season 5 (2010–11) ===
No. overall	No. in season	Title	Original release date	Prod. code
67a	1a	"Caillou's Cricket"	September 11, 2010	501a
67b	1b	"Dog Dilemma"	September 11, 2010	501b
Caillou becomes jealous when Sarah gets a new dog, Murphy, and she seems to want to spend all her time with Murphy rather than him.
67c	1c	"The Spider Issue"	September 11, 2010	501c
After an older friend, Daniel, gives him a comic about a mutant spider, Caillou develops fear of spiders.
68a	2a	"What's Ringette?"	September 11, 2010	503a
68b	2b	"Rainy Day at the Beach"	September 11, 2010	503b
68c	2c	"Caillou Climbs"	September 11, 2010	503c
69a	3a	"Big Kid Caillou"	September 12, 2010	505a
69b	3b	"Caillou's Glasses"	September 12, 2010	505b
69c	3c	"Caillou's Dance Party"	September 12, 2010	505c
The playschool is going to have a dance party, but there's one problem: Caillou doesn't know how to dance.
70a	4a	"Caillou's Cross-Hop"	September 18, 2010	509a
70b	4b	"Glitter Glitch"	September 18, 2010	509b
Caillou and his friends learn a lesson about hand washing when he inadvertently spreads glitter everywhere.
70c	4c	"The Untidy Classroom"	September 18, 2010	509c
Caillou wants the classroom to not be cleaned up so he can continue playing trains with his friends at school.
71a	5a	"No Tradebacks!"	September 18, 2010	510a
Caillou decides to trade Jay his small toy shovel for some stickers, but then wants the shovel back.
71b	5b	"Shoe Story"	September 18, 2010	510b
Caillou is jealous when Clementine gets new light-up shoes, but then realizes having new shoes isn't very fun.
71c	5c	"Rollie Racers"	September 18, 2010	510c
Caillou goes to the mall to get a Rollie Racer, then he helps his Daddy and works on the real car.
72a	6a	"Caillou's Song"	September 19, 2010	511a
Caillou plays the song "If You're Happy And You Know It" on his keyboard, but Rosie keeps distracting him.
72b	6b	"Follow Me"	September 19, 2010	511b
Caillou meets Andy, a new boy at school with autism. He doesn't find him fun at first, but realizes that Andy just prefers to play a different way.
72c	6c	"Where's Caillou?"	September 19, 2010	511c
Caillou tries to get away from Rosie, who wants to play dolls. The siblings then end up playing a game of hide and seek.
73a	7a	"Olive Muddle"	September 25, 2010	512a
Grandma brings over some olives to use in her cooking, and Caillou struggles to tell her the truth; he does not like olives.
73b	7b	"Caillou's Clay Play"	September 25, 2010	512b
73c	7c	"The Lightning Ball Express"	September 25, 2010	512c
74a	8a	"Sarah's Kite"	September 25, 2010	513a
When Caillou accidentally crashes Sarah's kite, Daddy helps them make a new one.
74b	8b	"Caillou's New Game"	September 25, 2010	513b
74c	8c	"Shiny Remember"	September 25, 2010	513c
75a	9a	"Bunny Shmunny"	September 26, 2010	515a
75b	9b	"That's Mine!"	September 26, 2010	515b
After Rosie accidentally scratches Caillou's bike, he decides to keep their belongings separate; but he breaks Daddy's guitar string and forgives Rosie and shares his toys once again.
75c	9c	"Raspberry Ruckus"	September 26, 2010	515c
Caillou teaches his sister Rosie how to blow raspberries, finds it funny, but then learns it's inappropriate when Rosie does it at a preschool open house, realizing he needs to be a better role model.
76a	10a	"Where is Mars?"	October 2, 2010	516a
76b	10b	"Emma's Extra Snacks"	October 2, 2010	516b
Caillou's classmate Emma reveals she has Type 1 diabetes. Caillou takes it as her being sick, and goes out of his way to be kind to her to help her feel better. Emma teaches him that having diabetes is just something she lives with, and that she can still play and be a kid.
76c	10c	"Lost and Found (2)"	October 2, 2010	516c
77a	11a	"Copycat Clementine"	October 3, 2010	518a
77b	11b	"Caillou's Poster"	October 3, 2010	518b
Caillou learns about giving credit to others when his friends help him draw a poster for the grocery store, and only he gets the credit.
77c	11c	"Playhouse Play Date"	October 3, 2010	518c
78a	12a	"Helping Mrs. Howard"	October 9, 2010	519a
78b	12b	"Caillou's Fun Run"	October 9, 2010	519b
78c	12c	"The New Girl"	October 9, 2010	519c
79a	13a	"Borrowed Book"	October 9, 2010	520a
79b	13b	"Fixing Mr. Bones"	October 9, 2010	520b
79c	13c	"Cailloodles"	October 9, 2010	520c
Jeffrey and Jason give their friends silly names, not realizing that their teasing is only making themselves laugh, not anyone else.
80a	14a	"Blueberry Point"	October 10, 2010	521a
80b	14b	"Class Pet"	October 10, 2010	521b
80c	14c	"In the Garden"	October 10, 2010	521c
Caillou, Mommy, and Rosie decide to clean up the garden for Daddy's birthday. Only instead of picking the weeds, Rosie keeps trying to pick the flowers.
81a	15a	"Caillou's Shadow"	October 11, 2010	506a
81b	15b	"High Flyers"	October 11, 2010	506b
81c	15c	"Caillou's Leaf Pile"	October 11, 2010	506c
82a	16a	"Caillou's Camel Ride"	October 16, 2010	522a
82b	16b	"It's Not Too Big for Me!"	October 16, 2010	522b
82c	16c	"Caillou's Flying Saucer"	October 16, 2010	522c
83a	17a	"Daddy's Puzzles"	October 16, 2010	523a
83b	17b	"Play with Me"	October 16, 2010	523b
With nobody to play with, Caillou ends up finding a ladybug to play with, and discovers other critters outside.
83c	17c	"Caillou's Bad Luck"	October 16, 2010	523c
84a	18a	"Kitty Conundrum"	October 17, 2010	524a
While looking for his dinosaur, Rexy, Caillou ends up finding a lost kitten. He's eager to keep it, but his parents remind him that the kitten has an owner.
84b	18b	"Caillou's Favorite Sweater"	October 17, 2010	524b
84c	18c	"Caillou's Big Dig"	October 17, 2010	524c
85a	19a	"Caillou Conducts"	October 23, 2010	525a
85b	19b	"Captain Caillou"	October 23, 2010	525b
85c	19c	"Caillou Roars"	October 23, 2010	525c
86a	20a	"Butterfly Surprise"	October 23, 2010	526a
Caillou and his friends learn about adapting to change when a field trip to the fire station is cancelled, and instead they go to a butterfly garden.
86b	20b	"Soccer Trouble"	October 23, 2010	526b
86c	20c	"You're Not Miss Martin!"	October 23, 2010	526c
A substitute takes over for Miss Martin while she's away, and Caillou dislikes all the mistakes Miss Shelley makes. His mom reminds him Miss Shelley is new, and suggests he help her with the classroom duties.
87a	21a	"Caillou Makes a Meal"	November 6, 2010	504a
Caillou learns about making pizzas when his family decides to make their own instead of ordering one.
87b	21b	"Caillou's New Groove"	November 6, 2010	504b
87c	21c	"Caillou Goes Bowling"	November 6, 2010	504c
88a	22a	"Caillou's Mini Marathon"	November 20, 2010	517a
88b	22b	"Smooth Sailing"	November 20, 2010	517b
88c	22c	"Am I Big Yet?"	November 20, 2010	517c
89a	23a	"Caillou Roller Skates"	February 6, 2011	502a
89b	23b	"Say Lettuce!"	February 6, 2011	502b
Caillou and Rosie spend the day at Grandma's house, he tries to take a picture of a rabbit.
89c	23c	"Caillou Tries to Whistle"	February 6, 2011	502c
90a	24a	"Sharing the Rocketship"	February 19, 2011	507a
90b	24b	"Coach Grandpa"	February 19, 2011	507b
90c	24c	"The Safety Helper"	February 19, 2011	507c
91a	25a	"Rushing the Raspberry"	February 20, 2011	508a
91b	25b	"Wait to Skate"	February 20, 2011	508b
Caillou learns about patience when Daddy builds a skating rink in the backyard, but they have to wait before they can play on it.
91c	25c	"Caillou's Hiccups"	February 20, 2011	508c
92a	26a	"Caillou Can Compost"	April 17, 2011	514a
92b	26b	"Caillou's Tree"	April 17, 2011	514b
After one of their trees is damaged in a storm, Caillou and Daddy go to a nursery to get a new one to take its place.
92c	26c	"Caillou Saves Water"	April 17, 2011	514c
After learning about water conservation in class, Caillou looks for ways around the house to save water.

== Revival series ==
=== Caillou's New Adventures (Web series) (2016–23) ===
==== Season 1 (2016–18) ====
No. overall	No. in season	Title	Original release date
93a	1a	"Caillou at the Market"	November 24, 2016
93b	1b	"Caillou at the Dentist"	March 29, 2017
93c	1c	"Caillou at the Fancy Restaurant"	April 12, 2017
93d	1d	"Caillou Dances With Grandma"	April 28, 2017
93e	1e	"Caillou's Valentine Surprise"	May 12, 2017
94a	2a	"Where's Gilbert?"	May 26, 2017
94b	2b	"Caillou's Favorite T-Shirt"	June 9, 2017
94c	2c	"Caillou Watches Rosie"	June 23, 2017
94d	2d	"Captain Caillou"	July 7, 2017
94e	2e	"Caillou Rides the Subway"	July 28, 2017
95a	3a	"Caillou's Hiccups"	August 4, 2017
95b	3b	"Caillou at the Beach"	September 15, 2017
95c	3c	"Caillou and the School Bus"	September 22, 2017
95d	3d	"Space Ranger Caillou"	September 28, 2017
95e	3e	"Trick or Treat, Caillou?"	October 6, 2017
96a	4a	"Caillou's New Friend"	November 4, 2017
96b	4b	"Caillou's Birthday Party"	November 17, 2017
96c	4c	"Caillou Goes Fishing"	December 1, 2017
96d	4d	"Caillou Fresh from the Farm"	December 19, 2017
96e	4e	"Caillou the Jungle Explorer"	January 26, 2018
97a	5a	"Caillou at the Farm"	January 27, 2018
97b	5b	"Caillou is Sick"	March 2, 2018
97c	5c	"Caillou's Thanksgiving"	November 10, 2017
97d	5d	"Park Ranger Caillou"	September 4, 2018
97e	5e	"Holiday Caillou"	November 24, 2017
98a	6a	"Doctor Caillou"	April 14, 2018
98b	6b	"Firefighter Caillou"	February 22, 2018
98c	6c	"Caillou Takes a Bath"	March 16, 2018
98d	6d	"Little Artist Caillou"	March 30, 2018
98e	6e	"Super Caillou"	April 13, 2018

==== Season 2 (2018–19) ====
No. overall	No. in season	Title	Original release date
99a	1a	"Caillou Scores a Goal"	June 1, 2018
99b	1b	"Caillou and the Rock Pools"	June 15, 2018
99c	1c	"Caillou at the Food Fair"	June 22, 2018
Caillou goes to the food fair and tries out all the different foods from different countries.
99d	1d	"Caillou's Big Slide"	July 6, 2018
99e	1e	"Caillou at the Picnic"	August 3, 2018
100a	2a	"Caillou Goes Camping"	August 17, 2018
100b	2b	"Caillou's Bicycle Race"	August 24, 2018
100c	2c	"Caillou's Anniversary Surprise"	August 31, 2018
100d	2d	"Caillou on the Plane"	September 21, 2018
100e	2e	"Caillou Gets a Camera"	September 28, 2018
101a	3a	"Caillou's Halloween Party"	October 5, 2018
101b	3b	"Caillou at the Toystore"	October 26, 2018
101c	3c	"Caillou's Snow Day"	November 9, 2018
101d	3d	"Caillou Decorates the Christmas Tree"	November 30, 2018
101e	3e	"Caillou Meets Santa"	December 9, 2018
102a	4a	"Caillou's Show and Tell"	December 28, 2018
102b	4b	"Caillou's Dinosaur Adventure"	January 18, 2019
102c	4c	"Cupid Caillou"	February 1, 2019
102d	4d	"Caillou's Video Game Adventure"	February 15, 2019
Caillou and Clementine play their favorite video game, "Dig and Build," but Mommy grounds both of them in order to help her and Daddy with chores outside.
102e	4e	"Caillou at the Circus"	March 1, 2019
103a	5a	"Caillou's Box Fort"	March 16, 2019
103b	5b	"Caillou's April Fools"	March 29, 2019
103c	5c	"Caillou's Easter Egg Hunt"	April 12, 2019
103d	5d	"Caillou at the Zoo"	April 26, 2019
103e	5e	"Leo's Birthday"	May 10, 2019
104a	6a	"Caillou's Eye Test"	May 24, 2019
104b	6b	"Caillou at the Aquarium"	June 12, 2019
104c	6c	"4th of July"	June 28, 2019
104d	6d	"Caillou at the Theme Park"	July 5, 2019
104e	6e	"Caillou at the Science Fair"	July 19, 2019

==== Season 3 (2019–20) ====
No. overall	No. in season	Title	Original release date
105a	1a	"Caillou at the Water Park"	August 2, 2019
105b	1b	"Caillou Gets Stung by a Bee"	August 16, 2019
105c	1c	"Caillou Goes Back to School"	August 30, 2019
105d	1d	"Caillou the Pizza Chef"	September 13, 2019
105e	1e	"Caillou and the Monster Under the Bed"	September 27, 2019
106a	2a	"Caillou's Spooky Slumber Party"	October 11, 2019
106b	2b	"Super Caillou Returns"	October 25, 2019
106c	2c	"Caillou the Knight"	November 8, 2019
106d	2d	"Caillou's Skateboard Trouble"	November 22, 2019
Caillou doesn't want to ride his new skateboard ever again because he rode on it without his elbow and knee pads. He goes down a hill, but he falls off and hurts his wrist.
106e	2e	"Caillou Saves Christmas"	December 6, 2019
107a	3a	"Caillou Goes Skiing"	December 20, 2019
107b	3b	"Caillou Goes to Work"	January 10, 2020
107c	3c	"Caillou and the Tooth Fairy"	January 17, 2020
Caillou gets a loose tooth.
107d	3d	"Caillou at the School Talent Show"	January 31, 2020
Caillou attends the talent show at school.
107e	3e	"Caillou at the Botanical Garden"	February 14, 2020
108a	4a	"Rosie's Birthday Party"	February 21, 2020
108b	4b	"Caillou's World Book Day Adventure"	February 28, 2020
Caillou's school is having a world book day. The students each receive a coupon for 1 free book, but Caillou can't decide which book he wants to buy.
108c	4c	"Caillou Pranks Rosie"	March 21, 2020
108d	4d	"Caillou and the Egg Race"	April 3, 2020
108e	4e	"Caillou's Underwater Adventure"	April 17, 2020
109a	5a	"Caillou and the Class Pet"	May 1, 2020
109b	5b	"Caillou Around the World"	May 22, 2020
109c	5c	"Cowboy Caillou"	June 5, 2020
109d	5d	"Caillou at the Arcade"	June 26, 2020
Caillou and Clementine go to the arcade.
109e	5e	"Caillou the Soccer Star"	June 12, 2020
110a	6a	"Caillou's Lemonade Stand"	July 10, 2020
110b	6b	"Caillou's Backyard Sports Day"	July 17, 2020
110c	6c	"Caillou's Water Fight"	July 24, 2020
110d	6d	"Caillou's Beach Day"	August 7, 2020
110e	6e	"Caillou and the Bully"	August 21, 2020
A new kid named Alex comes to Caillou's school and he bullies Caillou.

==== Season 4 (2020–21) ====
No. overall	No. in season	Title	Original release date
111a	1a	"Goodbye, Gerald"	October 31, 2020
Caillou is devastated to learn that Gerald, the class hamster, had died.
111b	1b	"Rosie's First Dentist Trip"	November 13, 2020
Rosie is nervous about her first time at the dentist.
111c	1c	"The Good, The Bad, The Caillou"	December 1, 2020
111d	1d	"Caillou Goes Ice Skating"	December 3, 2021
111e	1e	"Caillou and the Holiday Show"	December 16, 2020
Caillou's school is having a holiday show. Caillou is Christmas, Leo is Hanukkah, Clementine is Kwanzaa, and Sarah is Lunar New Year.
112a	2a	"Spy-ou"	January 15, 2021
Caillou and Sarah play spies with Sarah's new spy kit.
112b	2b	"Caillou and the March"	February 19, 2021
While selling cookies, Caillou and Clementine learn about racism after they and Clementine's mom see a march on the street.
112c	2c	"Caillou the Wizard"	February 12, 2021
112d	2d	"Caillou's London Vacation"	May 7, 2021
112e	2e	"Caillou and the Easter Bunny"	March 12, 2021
113a	3a	"Caillou's Great Escape"	April 9, 2021
Caillou is grounded after refusing to eat his vegetables. He then plans to sneak out to go play with his friends.
113b	3b	"Caillou and the Twins"	March 27, 2021
Caillou, Jason, and Jeffery plays some pranks on Daddy, Mommy, and Rosie at the indoor play centre.
113c	3c	"Caillou Breaks a Bone"	January 29, 2021
Caillou breaks his arm after he falls off his bike at the park.
113d	3d	"Caillou at the Vehicle Show"	June 4, 2021
113e	3e	"Caillou at the Fairground"	May 21, 2021
114a	4a	"Caillou and the Fire Drill"	April 23, 2021
Caillou's class is having a fire drill.
114b	4b	"Caillou at the Dinosaur Museum"	July 16, 2021
114c	4c	"Caillou and the Bird"	June 18, 2021
114d	4d	"Caillou Does Chores"	December 25, 2020
114e	4e	"Caillou the Ninja"	August 13, 2021
115a	5a	"Clementine's Beach Birthday"	August 27, 2021
115b	5b	"Caillou and the Dolphins"	September 10, 2021
115c	5c	"Caillou Goes Ape"	September 24, 2021
115d	5d	"Caillou Cheats"	October 8, 2021
Caillou learns a lesson when he tries to cheat off Leo's paper during a test.
115e	5e	"Viking Caillou"	October 22, 2021
116a	6a	"Caillou and the Rash"	November 6, 2021
Caillou gets a rash after Teddy falls into a bush full of poison ivy and Caillou putting him in his t-shirt.
116b	6b	"Caillou and the Parade"	November 19, 2021
Caillou and his family go to a parade.
116c	6c	"Caillou's Garden Fort"	July 30, 2021
116d	6d	"Caillou of the Future"	December 31, 2021
116e	6e	"Caillou's Happy New Year"	December 17, 2021
Caillou gets to go to his very first fancy New Year's Eve party with his parents.

==== Season 5 (2022–23) ====
(Features a new animation style)

No. overall	No. in season	Title	Original release date
117a	1a	"Doctor Caillou's Patient"	June 10, 2022
117b	1b	"The Floor is Lava"	June 25, 2022
117c	1c	"Camp Caillou"	July 9, 2022
Caillou goes camping with his scout troop.
117d	1d	"At the Vet"	July 23, 2022
While Caillou and Gilbert (pretends as a lion) play jungle in the backyard, Caillou and Gilbert climb a tree. Caillou accidentally falls off the tree causing the branch he and Gilbert were on to fall. Gilbert hurts his paw when the branch falls on it, so Caillou and his family go to the vet.
117e	1e	"Caillou's Home Movies"	November 12, 2022
118a	2a	"Strange New World"	August 6, 2022
After Miss Martin gets sick, Caillou goes to Miss Shelley's class for the day.
118b	2b	"Dress Up Day"	October 15, 2022
Caillou's school is having a dress up day. Caillou is dressed as a cowboy, Leo is dressed as a police officer, Clementine is dressed as a knight, Sarah is dressed as an astronaut, and Andy is dressed as a superhero. But while they play outside and have an imaginary treasure hunt, they make fun of Jeffery when he wears a fairy costume and they assumed the costume is for "girls".
118c	2c	"Show and Tell"	August 20, 2022
118d	2d	"Kindness Superhero"	September 3, 2022
118e	2e	"Kindness Badge"	September 17, 2022
119a	3a	"Caillou Has a Nightmare"	October 29, 2022
Caillou gets a nightmare after he watches a scary movie in the middle of the night.
119b	3b	"Caillou at the Restaurant"	December 10, 2022
119c	3c	"Honey, I Shrunk Caillou!"	December 24, 2022
Caillou and Rosie pretend they are miniauture version of themselves (their lookalike tiny dolls).
119d	3d	"Santa Comes for Christmas"	November 26, 2022
119e	3e	"Caillou Steals Candy"	January 21, 2023
Caillou really wants a chocolate bar and steals it from Mr. Johnson's store, but regrets what he did.
120a	4a	"Lunar New Year with Sarah"	January 7, 2023
Caillou goes to Sarah's house for Lunar New Year.
120b	4b	"The Wedding"	February 18, 2023
Clementine's mom is getting married!
120c	4c	"Rosie's Bedtime Stories"	February 4, 2023
120d	4d	"Caillou and the Trainset"	March 4, 2023
120e	4e	"Caillou and the Bunny"	March 17, 2023
Caillou and his family adopt a bunny at a petting zoo.
121a	5a	"Earth Day"	April 22, 2023
121b	5b	"Detective Caillou"	April 30, 2023
121c	5c	"Rosie's First Haircut"	May 12, 2023
Caillou, Mommy, and Rosie go to Rosie's very first haircut after her hair gets too long, but Rosie is nervous.
121d	5d	"Lost in the Jungle"	May 26, 2023
121e	5e	"Pottery Chaos"	June 9, 2023
Caillou and Mommy go to the Pottery Studio to make Daddy a Father's Day gift.
122a	6a	"Leo's Birthday Sleepover"	June 23, 2023
Caillou and Leo's disabled cousin, Caleb, go to Leo's birthday sleepover party.
122b	6b	"Rainy Day"	July 7, 2023
122c	6c	"Caillou Builds a Go Kart"	July 21, 2023
122d	6d	"Caillou Learns to Surf"	August 4, 2023
122e	6e	"Captain Caillou's Pirate Adventure"	August 18, 2023

=== Second: Caillou (Peacock) (2022–24) ===
==== Specials (2022) ====
Title	Original release date
"Rosie the Giant"	July 10, 2022
Rosie bullies Caillou at the playground while he's car racing with his friends, so he embarks on a journey as a red racer who has to come face to face with Rosie the Giant.
"Adventures with Grandma and Grandpa"	August 25, 2022
Caillou is excited to try swimming in the ocean and learn about his grandparents during a sleepover at Grandma and Grandpa's seaside cottage.
"The Bravest Wolf Boy"	October 15, 2022
Caillou is excited to attend a Halloween party at Clementine's, but he's afraid of the big things about the party he doesn't know.
"The Silver Knight"	November 13, 2022
Caillou imagines becoming a great knight who protects the kingdom while learning that friends and family make the best allies.
"Caillou's Perfect Christmas"	December 2, 2022
Caillou is excited for Christmas, but his plans are dashed when a Christmas Eve snowstorm comes to town and causes a power outage.

==== Season 1 (2024) (Peacock) ====
No. overall	No. in season	Title	Original release date
123a	1a	"The Pirate Captain's Treasure"	February 15, 2024
Caillou goes into a pirate fantasy.
123b	1b	"Sir Yucks a Lot"	February 15, 2024
A yucky dinner prevents Caillou from having his dessert.
124a	2a	"Caillou to the Hoop"	February 15, 2024
Caillou grows frustrated when he struggles to shoot a basketball, so he imagines he's a space captain helping his pilot land a shuttle.
124b	2b	"Caillou's Two Step"	February 15, 2024
When Caillou can't get the line dance steps right, he worries he'll ruin it for everyone.
125a	3a	"The Impatient Explorer"	February 15, 2024
Daddy brings home a mysterious box for Rosie and Caillou.
125b	3b	"Lonely Island"	February 15, 2024
Gilbert sleeps in Rosie's room.
126a	4a	"Rock-a-Bye Rosie"	February 15, 2024
Caillou insists on rocking out loudly like a real rockstar, but his family is worried that it’ll keep Rosie from having her nap.
126b	4b	"Meteor Shower"	February 15, 2024
A new family arrives at the park.
127a	5a	"Caillou the Bird Whisperer"	February 15, 2024
When his excitement scares away the birds, Caillou pretends to be an explorer who is startled by an overly enthusiastic Bigfoot.
127b	5b	"Building a Better Snow Buddy"	February 15, 2024
When Caillou thinks his snow buddy isn't as good as Sarah's, he feels inadequate and embarks on a construction fantasy.
128a	6a	"Caillou's Supersized Job"	February 15, 2024
When Clementine comes over to play, Caillou can't find her favorite action figure in his messy room.
128b	6b	"The Uncomfortable Hat"	February 15, 2024
Caillou has to wear an uncomfortable sun hat, but he is too shy to tell Clementine's mommy how he feels.
129a	7a	"The Red Balloon Race"	February 15, 2024
Caillou's eager to play balloons.
129b	7b	"Caillou's Big Bathtime"	February 15, 2024
Caillou climbs into the bathtub and takes a bath.
130a	8a	"Caillou's Home Run"	May 16, 2024
Caillou wants to play T-ball instead of helping.
130b	8b	"Lost and Found Safari"	May 16, 2024
Caillou finds a tiger toy in the school yard.
131a	9a	"The Best Medicine"	May 16, 2024
Caillou feels helpless after Grandma hurts her ankle, so he imagines trying to help a sneezy Rexy.
131b	9b	"Caillou Clears the Air"	May 16, 2024
Caillou and Leo are pretending to be airshow pilots when Leo accidentally bumps into Caillou and breaks his toy plane.
132a	10a	"May the Best Friend Win"	May 16, 2024
Caillou is critical of his teammate Leo during a relay race until a fantasy sporting event teaches him that being too competitive is unhelpful for everyone.
132b	10b	"Bean Sprout Blues"	May 16, 2024
Caillou struggles to say goodbye to his beloved bean plant.
133a	11a	"Caillou's Monstrous Night"	May 16, 2024
Caillou develops a new fear in a spooky monster tracker fantasy.
133b	11b	"Caillou Takes a Leap"	May 16, 2024
Caillou is too scared to ride after taking a tumble off his bike.
134a	12a	"Super Duper Billy"	May 16, 2024
Caillou feels intimidated by Clementine's cool older brother Billy, so he pretends to be superhero Skip Super.
134b	12b	"Caillou's Great Giveaway"	May 16, 2024
Caillou generously gives away Rosie's doll at the neighborhood "give and take".
135a	13a	"A Castle a Day"	May 16, 2024
Caillou is crestfallen when the beautiful sandcastle he built with Grandpa gets washed away by the rising tide.
135b	13b	"The Achy Breaky Playdate"	May 16, 2024
Caillou accidentally breaks Clementine's mom's dinosaur model.
136	14	"Leo on the Move"	August 29, 2024
Caillou is upset that Leo is moving to a new house but later visits him and tries to cheer him up.
137a	15a	"Missing Rexy"	August 29, 2024
Caillou's toy dinosaur goes missing.
137b	15b	"Bubble Trouble"	August 29, 2024
Caillou is frustrated with how Rosie blows bubbles.
138a	16a	"The One True Treasure"	August 29, 2024
Caillou's friends think that his dad is a treasure hunter.
138b	16b	"Caillou's Cold Day"	August 29, 2024
Caillou wants his cold to go away.
139a	17a	"Caillou's School Rules"	August 29, 2024
Caillou considers breaking Ms. Martin's rules.
139b	17b	"The Boastful Buckaroo"	August 29, 2024
Caillou accidentally upsets his friends.
140a	18a	"The Thank You Trick"	August 29, 2024
Caillou gets overwhelmed while trying to draw a special card.
140b	18b	"R-O-Uh-Oh!"	August 29, 2024
Caillou's excited to fly his kite.
141a	19a	"Caillou Feels Super Bad"	August 29, 2024
Caillou mistakenly ruins dinner.
141b	19b	"Thar She Blows"	August 29, 2024
Caillou feels jealous that Rosie can whistle better than he can.
142a	20a	"I Spy a Spy"	August 29, 2024
Caillou sneaks away from his friends.
142b	20b	"Monster Tag"	August 29, 2024
Caillou excludes Rosie from playing Monster Tracker.
143a	21a	"Caillou's in Deep Water"	October 3, 2024
A messy park gets in the way of a paper boat race.
143b	21b	"Chalk-A-Block"	October 3, 2024
Caillou doesn't understand the rules of a game.
144a	22a	"Going Solo"	October 3, 2024
Caillou tries to impress Ms. Martin by singing a solo.
144b	22b	"Caillou, the Bored"	October 3, 2024
Caillou pretends to be on a quest to find the cure for boredom.
145a	23a	"A Giant Misunderstanding"	October 3, 2024
Caillou pretends to be the red pilot after he accidentally hurts Rosie's feelings by not listening to her.
145b	23b	"The Blame Game"	October 3, 2024
Mommy's new plant gets mysteriously knocked over.
146a	24a	"Caillou Plays It Safe"	December 5, 2024
After a safety lesson at school, Caillou goes overboard trying to accident-proof his house.
146b	24b	"Time to Recharge"	December 5, 2024
It may be bedtime, but Caillou is having too much fun playing Space Captain to sleep.
147a	25a	"Seriously Silly"	December 5, 2024
When Caillou's silliness disrupts the class, he goes into a Rodeo fantasy where he learns that being silly isn't always as much fun as it seems.
147b	25b	"Caillou Clings On"	December 5, 2024
Caillou's Daddy has to stop playing to run an errand.
148a	26a	"Operation: Meeting Ms. Martin"	December 5, 2024
When Caillou sees Ms. Martin outside of school, he acts very shy until a secret agent fantasy shows him that hiding from Ms. Martin is not good.
148b	26b	"Understanding Tina"	December 5, 2024
Caillou is anxious to choose a game that Tina can play with her prosthetic arm.

== Films ==
Title	Original release date
"Caillou's Holiday Movie"	October 7, 2003
Caillou explores Christmas traditions from around the world, after his daddy gives him a Christmas calendar that features a different country's tradition behind each window.
