= Johanne Garneau =

Canadian actress

Johanne Garneau is a Canadian actress.

Garneau was born in Princeville, a village in Québec.

== Filmography ==
- 1976: Grand-Papa (TV series): Lise
- 1984: Les Huxtable (TV series): Rudith "Rudy" Lillian Huxtable (Keshia Knight Pulliam)
- 1986: Des dames de cœur (TV series): Nicole Belleau
- 1989: Tous les chiens vont au paradis: Anne-Marie
- 1989: The Simpsons (TV series): Ralph Wiggum, Todd Flanders, Selma Bouvier, Agnes Skinner, Blandine
- 1993: La Princesse astronaute (TV series): Fée Odale
- 2000: Caillou (TV series): Leo (voice)
- 2001–2002: Sagwa, the Chinese Siamese Cat (TV series): ‘’Additional Voices’’ (voice)
- 2001: Belphégor (TV series): Sarah (voice, 26 episodes)
- 2008: American Dad! (TV series): Francine Smith (voice)
- 2009: Poppets Town (TV series): Cocori (voice)
