= Saving Emily =

2004 television film directed by Douglas Jackson

- Also known as: Blood Trap
- Genre: Thriller
- Written by: Sue Dolan; Mark Evan Schwartz; Ken Sanders
- Directed by: Douglas Jackson
- Starring: Alexandra Paul; Michael Riley; Bruce Boxleitner; Annie Bovaird
- Music by: Steve Gurevitch
- Country of origin: Canada
- Original language: English

Production
- Producers: Neil Bregman; Stefan Wodoslawsky
- Cinematography: Bert Tougas
- Editor: Robert E. Newton
- Running time: 97 minutes
- Production companies: Outrage Productions 3 Movie Venture

Original release
- Network: Lifetime
- Release: 11 October 2004

Saving Emily (also known as Blood Trap) is a Canadian made-for-television thriller film directed by Douglas Jackson and broadcast in the United States at 11 October 2004 on Lifetime.

== Plot ==
Cheryl (Alexandra Paul) lives with her abusive husband Kurt (Michael Riley) in a small house at Canada. One night, Kurt returns after having accidentally murdered a man while out. Cheryl flees in a car with her baby daughter Emily (Annie Bovaird).

Ten years later, Cheryl is living with her new husband Gregory (Bruce Boxleitner). Emily does not know the existence or identity of her biological father. On her tenth birthday, she relapses into leukemia and is hospitalised. A small sample of body tissue is needed to save her from an otherwise certain death; however, Cheryl is found to be incompatible with the required transplant. After much hesitation, she decides to contact Kurt.

Cheryl locates Kurt's new house after some searching. She is greeted by his girlfriend, who mistakes her for an investor in Kurt's new bar across town. Kurt, she finds out, is now in serious debt from failed investments, and his bar is struggling to stay afloat. Kurt first refuses to help after the anger of meeting a belligerent and hostile Gregory.

Kurt later breaks into Cheryl's house, and admits that he is agreeing to help, in exchange for $600,000 from Cheryl. Additionally, she must not involve Gregory. He demands Cheryl's wedding ring as a "deposit". Afterwards, he is shown giving the ring to criminal loan shark Russo, in attempt to buy more time before the debt is due to be paid. Russo turns down the offer, saying "[his] wife already has enough diamonds".

Naturally, Gregory is furious when he realises he has been left out proceedings, and that his wife has been blackmailed. He has no choice but to cooperate, helping collect $300,000. They cannot make any more loans from the bank until they have paid off their current loans, meaning they cannot reach $600,000. Kurt is desperate, and even more so when Cheryl visits one day to find his girlfriend's bloodied corpse. Kurt flees to her home, explaining that Russo is close on his heels, and had killed his girlfriend as an urgent warning.

Cheryl visits her estranged Uncle Theo, a rich man, hoping to borrow the remaining $300,000. He scolds her for her foolishness in being blackmailed, and points out that because she ignored his advice when he first warned her about marrying Kurt, he has no obligation to pay her for her mistake. The dialogue which ensues reveals that Cheryl wants to save Kurt, as much as Emily.

Kurt, meantime, makes friends with Emily (who only knows him as a benefactor). He deceives Emily into believing that her mother has been involved in an accident. He kidnaps her under the guise of taking her to see her mother, and goes to their old, now abandoned house. Cheryl correctly guesses their whereabouts and confronts him. Gregory secretly rescues Emily through a window.

The confrontation between Cheryl and Kurt is disrupted when Russo and his henchman arrive. He comments on Kurt's changing relationships with women, and says that he no longer intends to wait for the debt to be paid. His henchman shoots at Cheryl, but Kurt leaps in the way and takes the bullet for her. Russo is taken aback. As his henchman reloads, Kurt pulls out a hidden gun and kills both of them.

At hospital, a dying Kurt calls for Cheryl and tells her that "[he] gave Emily what she needed", and returns her ring. An epilogue shows Cheryl and Gregory waving to Emily from their home, who has now fully recovered.

== Cast ==
- Alexandra Paul as Cheryl
- Michael Riley as Kurt
- Bruce Boxleitner as Gregory
- Annie Bovaird as Emily
- Corinne Conley as Grandmother Wilton
- Chuck Shamata as Russo
- Sophie Gendron as Taylor
- Barry Flatman as Uncle Theo
- Andreas Apergis as Will
