= Grand-papa (TV series) =

Grand-papa is a French-Canadian téléroman which aired on SRC Télévision between 1976 and 1979. Written by Janette Bertrand, the series totaled 115 episodes.

== Plot ==
The series is centered on Charles-Henri Lamontagne, an elderly widower coping with the death of his wife, and his influence on his family in Montreal. Through the script, Janette Bertrand explores sensitive issues still taboo for the Quebec society in the late 1970s.

== Rerun ==
Radio-Canada started to re-air the show on September 10, 2008. It is scheduled to air Mondays to Fridays at 3:30 p.m.

== Cast ==
- Sophie Clément – Shirley
- Pierre Dufresne – Jean-Paul
- Yves Fortin – Jean-François
- Amulette Garneau – Armande
- Johanne Garneau – Lise
- Marie Guimont – Anémone Lamontagne
- Rita Lafontaine – Martine
- Jean Lajeunesse – Charles-Henri Lamontagne
- Lucie St-Cyr – Rose Lamontagne
