= Caillou =

Animated television series (1997–2011)

- Genre: Children's television series
- Created by: Hélène Desputeaux; Christine L'Heureux
- Based on: Caillou by Hélène Desputeaux
- Voices of: Bryn McAuley; Jaclyn Linetsky; Annie Bovaird; Brigid Tierney; Jesse Vinet; Jennifer Seguin; Pat Fry; Pauline Little; George Morris; Johanne Garneau; Jonathan Koensgen; Graeme Jokic; Sophie Uretsky; Amanda Tilson; Holly Gauthier-Frankel; Ellen David
- Countries of origin: Canada; South Africa (season 5)
- Original languages: French; English
- No. of seasons: 5
- No. of episodes: 92 (345 segments) (list of episodes)

Production
- Running time: 22 minutes (3–4 5-minute segments)
- Production companies: Cookie Jar Entertainment (Note: Known as CINAR Corporation for the first three seasons. Produced as Caillou Productions Inc. (S1), Four Me Productions Inc. (S2-3), Caillou IV Productions Inc. (S4) and Caillou V Productions Inc. (S5)); Clockwork Zoo (season 5)

Original release
- Network: Télétoon (French); Teletoon (English, seasons 1–4); Treehouse TV (English, season 5)
- Release: September 15, 1997 – April 17, 2011

Caillou (transl. pebble or stone; /kɑːjʊ, -juː/ kah-yuu, -yoo; French: [kaju], stylized in lowercase) is an animated children's television series that aired on Teletoon (both English and French versions), with the first episode airing on the former channel on September 15, 1997 until the fourth season. After that, the fifth season channel was moved to Treehouse TV, and the series finale aired on April 17, 2011. It also aired on PBS and the PBS Kids channel from 2000 to 2020. A series reboot was announced in 2023 with a release date set to debut later that year on Peacock with 52 eleven-minute episodes. Still, it was delayed for undisclosed reasons to February 15, 2024, with a batch of seven episodes.

Based on the books by Hélène Desputeaux, it focuses on a four-year-old boy named Caillou who is fascinated by the world around him. The series was produced in Canada by the CINAR Corporation (later Cookie Jar Entertainment), while the fifth and final season was produced in association with the South African studio Clockwork Zoo.

The series received initial positive reviews from critics and audiences. Contrarily, in the years following its release, the series saw a more negative reception and sparked backlash regarding its themes, writing, and perceived lack of educational value. The title character's misbehavior in particular has also been widely condemned, especially in its earlier seasons.

== Premise ==
Caillou lives with his family (his mother Doris, father Boris, younger sister Rosie, and pet cat Gilbert). He has many adventures with his family and friends, and uses his imagination in every episode.

During the first season, many of the stories in the animated version began with a grandmother (who is also the show's narrator) introducing the story to her grandchildren, then reading the story from a book. Starting in the second season, the narrator and grandmother is an unseen character.

On PBS Kids (and on Teletoon under the name Caillou and Friends), each episode in season 1 through season 3 has a theme and is divided into several short sections that mix animation, puppet skits, and video of live-action children in real-life situations. In seasons 4 and 5, the episodes are divided into three short sections; the puppet segment was dropped, alongside the "Real Kids" version of the segment.

== Format ==
The series features a narrator, who is said to sound like a grandmother. The frames of the series' backgrounds are whited out and resemble a dream cloud. According to Sara Smith of Detroit Free Press, "Caillou is rendered in minimalist settings splashed with blazing primary colors. The family cat is gray – with blue spots. It's a kindergarten teacher's bad acid trip." Additionally, she noted that "the show was broken up into small digestible segments to hold a small attention span."

== Characters ==
=== Major characters ===
==== Caillou ====
Caillou (voiced first by Bryn McAuley from 1997 to 2000, then Jaclyn Linetsky from 2000 until her death in 2003, and then Annie Bovaird from 2003 to 2010) meaning pebble or stone in French (nicknamed by himself The Prince of Imagination), is the title character of the show. Caillou was first shown in the episode "Caillou Makes Cookies", which aired in 1997.

Caillou is an imaginative four-year-old boy with a love for forms of transportive machinery such as rocket ships and airplanes. A dreamer, Caillou is inclined to frequent dream sequences in some episodes, visualizing his daydreams and wishes, and many episodes describe his normal daily experiences with his parents, friends, and neighbours. Caillou particularly loves his stuffed dinosaur, Rexy, and teddy bear, Teddy, along with his pet cat Gilbert, all of whom are depicted as puppets in segments featured in the earlier episodes. He is Boris and Doris' son as well as Rosie's older brother.

==== Caillou's family ====
Caillou and his family from left to right: Rosie, Boris, Caillou, Doris

- Rosie (voiced by Brigid Tierney, then Jesse Vinet, known in French as Mousseline) – Caillou's lively younger sister and Boris and Doris' daughter who is a typical toddler. She is two years old. She always wants to take part in the same activities as Caillou. In later seasons of the series, she becomes more talkative and independent. She wears a blue dress, red socks and blue Mary Jane shoes. Rosie fights with Caillou for some reasons, but they still love each other. She appears to be the only family member with red hair.
- Doris/Mommy (voiced by Jennifer Seguin) – Caillou and Rosie's mother as well as Boris' wife and Grandma and Grandpa's daughter-in-law. She is a busy homemaker most of the time but is seen to work in an office, as well. Caillou occasionally helps his mother with different chores, and she often takes time to involve Caillou and his friends in activities such as crafts and baking. She is predominantly dressed in a red blouse with yellow trim, blue headband, ankle-length blue jeans and blue shoes with green soles.
- Boris/Daddy (voiced by Pat Fry) – Caillou and Rosie's father as well as Doris' husband. He wears a green sweater with a red trim with blue jeans. In the episode "Caillou The Chef" he says he once worked at a restaurant and made pizza. He and Caillou occasionally work on projects around the house together.
- Gilbert – Caillou's pet cat. In the puppet segments, he is shown to be knowledgeable about things which are foreign to Rexy and Teddy.
- Rosemary/Grandma (voiced by Pauline Little) – Caillou and Rosie's paternal grandmother as well as Doris' mother-in-law. Grandma is a very active lady who loves the arts and the outdoors. She passes that love onto Caillou. Grandma often comes up with creative ideas to solve Caillou's problems. She and Caillou paint and go bird-watching together.
- Duncan/Grandpa (voiced by George Morris) – Caillou and Rosie's paternal grandfather as well as Doris' father-in-law. He takes Caillou on adventures, often going on walks and riding the bus throughout the town where they reside. In "Caillou's Hiding Place", he showed Caillou a hidden area inside a tree in the backyard where Caillou's daddy used as a youngster. In the episode "Caillou Goes Camping", he and Caillou camp in the backyard. He is Daddy's father and loves to tell stories about when Calliou's father was a little boy. He wears a blue shirt.

==== Caillou's friends, neighbours, and associates ====
- Paul Hinkle (also known as "Mr. Hinkle" and French name: Monsieur Lajoie) – Caillou's neighbour, introduced in the 1998 episode "Caillou's Not Afraid Anymore". He has a gold tooth. In the episode "Farmer for the Day".

Caillou and his friends: (back) Clementine, Sarah – (front) Gilbert, Caillou, Leo, Rosie

- Leo (voiced by Johanne Garneau from 1997 to 2003, Vince Davies in Caillou's Holiday Movie, Jonathan Koensgen from 2006 to 2008 and Graeme Jokic in 2010) – A boy who started out as a bully in the 1999 episode "Caillou at Daycare", but quickly befriended Caillou in the same episode. They have been inseparable since. He is of Jewish faith and celebrates Hanukkah (stated in Caillou's Holiday Movie).
- Clementine (voiced by Brigid Tierney and Sophie Uretsky) – Clementine was the first to befriend Caillou in the 1999 episode "Caillou at Daycare". She can get rather bossy for some reasons, but all in all she is pretty understanding. She is of African-Canadian descent. Caillou has a crush on her, as indicated in "Caillou's Valentines" (season 4, episode 8).
- Sarah (voiced by Amanda Tilson) – Caillou's friend, whom he first met in "Caillou Goes Around the Block". She is of Chinese descent and celebrates Chinese New Year. She has a cousin in an episode where she invites Caillou to celebrate Chinese New Year. In another she invites him to school for "Bring Your Younger Siblings to School Day" because she has no siblings. Sarah has a pet cat named Olly and a dog named Murphy.
- André – A redheaded boy, André is introduced in the episode "Caillou's Big Friend" and usually wears red sandals. According to the song "Days of the Week", released on the Caillou music CD Caillou and Friends, Caillou plays with him every Saturday. André enjoys biking and soccer.
- Julie (voiced by Holly Gauthier-Frankel) – Caillou's and Rosie's teenage babysitter. She has blonde hair in a ponytail, and enjoys playing with Caillou and Rosie.
- Jason and Jeffrey – Identical twin brothers who are of Hispanic descent. They both enjoy eating pizza. Initially, they wore identical clothes. By Season 4, though, Jason began wearing a shirt with inverted colours so it's easier to tell them apart. They are both in Caillou's playschool class. The first episode they appeared in was "New House, New Neighbors".
- Billy (voiced by Michael Caloz in season 1) – Clementine's older brother. He is usually seen playing in a band with his friends or playing sports.
- Ann Martin (also known as "Ms. Martin", she voiced by Ellen David) – Caillou's preschool teacher. She has red hair and wears red overalls with a long-sleeved white shirt. According to the episode "A Surprise for Ms. Martin", her birthday is in June. This was stated in "Caillou at Daycare".
- Jonas (voiced by Brian Wrench) – Boris’s friend from before he met Doris. He lives on a ranch and has a horse named Lucky. Jonas appears in four episodes and in Caillou's Holiday Movie.
- Emma – A girl in Caillou's playschool class who dislikes loud noises, wearing red. It is stated in an episode that she has Type 1 Diabetes.
- Xavier – A boy in Caillou's playschool class who has brown hair and wears blue overalls.

==== The puppets ====
The puppet segments were originally featured on the PBS broadcasts of Caillou from 2000 to 2003 as continuity to fill time usually taken up by commercial breaks during the original Teletoon broadcasts; later episodes on PBS did not include the puppet segment continuity. This version of the series also aired on Teletoon as a separate series under the name Caillou and Friends from March 5, 2001 to January 2, 2005.

- Gilbert (puppeteered by Bob Stutt) – Caillou's pet cat and he is the leader of the group. He has greyish-blue fur with black stripes and loathes dogs with a passion. He especially dislikes the bulldog in the neighbourhood. In the puppet segments of the show, Gilbert often consists odes.
- Rexy (puppeteered and voiced by Pier Paquette) – Caillou's bluish toy dinosaur and speaks in a somewhat foreign accent, he is very playful. Rexy has the incapability to give a "good" hug. Rexy is noted for being rather pedantic. He is often teased about his speech impediment, and tends to react violently to any mention of it.
- Teddy (puppeteered by Frank Meschkuleit) – An old teddy bear that once belonged to Caillou's father, and now belongs to Caillou, Teddy is reasonable and nice. He is somewhat pessimistic, but all in all, he just needs a hug.
- Deedee (puppeteered by Tim Gosley, voiced by Holly Gauthier-Frankel) – A brown squirrel, she has a bushy tail, and is often seen playing with Rexy. Deedee first appeared as a baby squirrel when Rexy found on the ground lost from her family. Deedee lives in Caillou's backyard where most of the puppet segments take place. She never appeared in Season 3.

== Episodes ==
Caillou consists of five seasons of 92 half-hour episodes, as well as the 90-minute Christmas film Caillou's Holiday Movie.

Caillou series overview
| Season | Episodes | Segments | Originally aired | |
| Season | Episodes | Segments | First aired | Last aired |
|---|---|---|---|---|
| 1 | 13 | 65 | September 15, 1997 | November 18, 1997 |
| 2 | 20 | 80 | August 26, 2000 | October 13, 2000 |
| 3 | 13 | 62 | January 12, 2002 | March 31, 2002 |
| 4 | 20 | 60 | April 1, 2006 | August 23, 2006 |
| 5 | 26 | 78 | September 11, 2010 | April 17, 2011 |

== Production ==
Caillou books have been published by Chouette Publishing Inc. since 1989. As Caillou appeared as a much younger child in the original line of children's books, he originally had no hair. When illustrators found that adding hair made him look unrecognizable, it was decided that the character would be bald. Chouette Publishing defended the decision to make the character bald: "Caillou's baldness may make him different, but we hope it helps children understand that being different isn't just okay, it's normal." According to the series' official website, the show's target audience was apparently largely unfazed by the character's baldness: "The fact that he is bald does not seem to bother preschoolers in the least. Not only do they never mention it, but when asked to think about why Caillou has no hair, our focus groups just laughed and replied: 'He just doesn't have any hair!'" This decision to keep the character bald in the series led to an urban legend/internet meme that suggests the title character has cancer or pediatric alopecia, and claims to explain why his parents supposedly allow him to throw tantrums with impunity.

The series was originally broadcast in French in Canada, and the episodes were later translated into English. The original books were also in French. Caillou was designed primarily for toddlers. It was created by child developmental psychologists. In 1997, 65 five-minute episodes of Caillou were aired in Canada and in selected markets worldwide, including the US. In 2000 there were 40 30-minute episodes of the show, containing a mixture of the five-minute episodes plus new stories, songs, "Real Kids" segment and puppets. This was followed by another 16 30-minute episodes containing all-new stories in 2003. The film Caillou's Holiday Movie was released on October 7, 2003. On April 3, 2006, a new set of 20 episodes finally premiered after a three-year hiatus. Caillou started attending preschool and there were new themes and a new opening. New character redesigns were handled by Travis Cowsill, a storyboard artist on Timon and Pumbaa and Invasion America. The show was renewed for a second and third season in 2003, and later a fourth season. The fifth season was animated by South Africa-based studio Clockwork Zoo.

On November 14, 2012, the fourth season of the series was pre-sold to PBS Kids in the United States.

== Reception and legacy ==
Caillou initially received generally positive reviews from television critics and parents of young children. The staff of Entertainment Weekly wrote that its protagonist "embellish[es] everything he sees with his rich imagination." The New York Times wrote "Caillou looks at the world through the eyes of its 4-year-old namesake [and] takes life's not-always-so-simple lessons and presents them in a way preschoolers can understand," while Lynne Heffley of the Los Angeles Times wrote that "each animated episode is an unusually realistic reflection of a preschooler's daily fun, family interaction, challenges, disappointments and misunderstandings as Caillou grows and learns to make sense of his world", also describing it as "a virtual guidebook for parents and caregivers".

As the years progressed, however, the show drew criticism for what viewers perceived as incorrect lessons children could glean through various moments throughout the series. Most of these criticisms stemmed from episodes in the show's first season, but some episodes from the second season and third season received backlash as well. In a National Post column, writer Tristin Hopper identified Caillou to be "quite possibly the world's most universally reviled children's program." A common criticism towards the series is that the title character behaves like a spoiled child and suffers no consequences from his parents for his behavior, and is even rewarded on some occasions. Tori Carlo of Comic Book Resources specifically criticized a scene in which Caillou "pinches his newborn sister's cheek until she cries, all because he is jealous of all the attention she is getting," noting that he suffered no consequences for doing this.

Jef Rouner of Houston Press opined:

"Caillou serves as a kind of avatar for the worst of young child selfishness and whining. Children are psychopathic and self-centered by nature, of course, but once you give them a colorful hero to feed their innate desire to get their way through asserting that they should louder and louder, you're really turning it up. A child sees Caillou whine and cry and rage against the primary-colored plastic machine the very second anything goes slightly against his plan, the moment any task isn't instantly and effortlessly accomplished, and that child thinks. 'TV loves me, and TV says it's okay.'"

Sara Smith of Detroit Free Press noted that several episodes of the series were pulled from rotation due to Caillou's behavior in them: "The kid is such a demon seed: lying to his mother, tormenting the family cat, swatting his baby sister with a book. Even in later versions, where his bad behavior was toned down after criticism from parents, he's thoughtless, selfish and impulsive."

Additionally, the series has attracted criticism for its perceived lack of educational value. Hopper once said: "Unlike most children's programming, Caillou makes almost no attempt to educate its young audience. There are no veiled math problems, spelling lessons or morality tales; it's just calm, non-threatening, bright-coloured people navigating everyday tasks." These criticisms of the show's title character have been echoed on online platforms. Craig Silverman of BuzzFeed wrote: "Every episode is a showcase of terrible parenting. In one episode, Caillou gets chicken pox. And then Rosie gets it, because Mom and Dad are too dumb to keep her away from Caillou. Caillou looks a little too happy about the situation, too, yes?"

BuzzFeed and The Kansas City Star reported that many parents and babysitters "rejoiced" on social media in response to the announcement that PBS would be cancelling reruns of the program in 2021. Carlo noted that "even before its cancellation, the internet was chockfull of Youtube [sic] parodies and mixes about how spoiled the show's titular character is. [...] The end of Caillou brought a wave of relief over the internet, as parents voiced their long-standing opinions of the boy needing a major time-out. Caillou's fascination with learning about the world was only outpaced by his belief that the world was his for the taking – a lesson kids had no business being exposed to."

Despite the criticism, Carlo commended the series' longevity and encouragement of children to explore and learn:

"Caillou managed to remain on the air for an astounding 20 years, simply because it was a solid educational program that got toddlers eager to explore the vast world around them. Caillou's other main trait was how fascinated he was with learning about everything, from the deserts of Egypt to the local carwash. Caillou's eager imagination made even the most ordinary activities seem new and colorful, which is a definite draw for young, growing minds."

The software Vyond (previously known as GoAnimate) has often been used to create online parodies of Caillou and other children's shows. Researchers of children's media have noted young viewers encounter these videos, illustrating the software's circulation in youth media consumption alongside official children's content.

== Broadcast and streaming ==
Caillou first aired on Canada's French-language Télétoon channel on September 15, 1997, and was the first show aired on the English-language Teletoon when it launched on October 17 of that year. The series was moved to Treehouse TV in 2010. Caillou made its US debut on PBS Kids on September 4, 2000, and ran on that network until December 27, 2020, though local reruns continued through December 31, with all mentions of Caillou being removed from the PBS Kids website next day. Reruns started airing on PBS Kids Sprout (later known as simply Sprout) on its launch on September 26, 2005. While Sprout rebranded into Universal Kids on September 9, 2017, the show remained on the channel until it was taken off the line-up at the beginning of April 2019.

On January 5, 2021, PBS Kids announced on Twitter that they would no longer broadcast reruns of Caillou. Deadline Hollywood reported that many parents and viewers celebrated the news of the cancellation, as they have complained that Caillou had taught their kids bad lessons and encouraged them to be bratty and whiny. On August 16, 2021, it was announced that Cartoon Network had acquired the US broadcast rights to the show after PBS' rights expired, with reruns of the series airing on Cartoonito from September 13, 2021, until May 4, 2022. PBS ultimately sold the rights for US$6.4 million. In Canada, Family Jr. continues to broadcast reruns from February 5, 2018 until October 22, 2025. PBS Kids currently retains the physical media and streaming rights for the original series. Comcast/NBCUniversal acquired global streaming rights for the reboot series (via Peacock) as of 2022. Caillou is available to stream on Tubi, Pluto TV, and The Roku Channel.

== Home video releases ==
In the United States, Caillou videocassettes and DVDs have been released by PBS Distribution (originally distributed through Warner Home Video until 2004, and then Paramount Home Entertainment from 2006 to 2010, and now self-distributed). From 2003 to 2006, the DVDs with puppets and Jaclyn Linetsky were compilations from 2003 through 2006, and one of them is in memory of Linetsky herself.

For the franchise's 25th anniversary, a DVD/book combo pack reissue of Caillou's Family Favorites was released on October 14, 2014, by PBS Distribution, while a DVD reissue of Caillou's Holiday Movie was released on November 11, 2014, by NCircle Entertainment.

In Canada, Sony Wonder originally released Caillou on VHS and DVD, and after the closure of the division by Sony, were moved to Vivendi Entertainment Canada. Since 2012, Caillou DVDs are distributed by Entertainment One and after their purchase of Phase 4 Films in 2015, are released through the KaBoom Entertainment label.

In addition, Caillou is available in the digital format. The show can be viewed via purchasing, rental and subscription through various providers.

== Music ==
The series' theme song is sung in Caillou's voice. According to Craig Silverman of BuzzFeed: "The theme song says the word Caillou 14,356 times. [...] The director basically told the voice actor, 'As high-pitched as you can go, with extra whine.'" In 2003, an album titled Caillou's Favorite Songs was released by Kid Rhino under the Cinar Music imprint.

== Revival ==
=== YouTube series ===
Beginning in late 2016, a new Caillou web series for YouTube premiered on the official Caillou channel and was later released onto Amazon Prime. These shorts are mainly remakes of older episodes and are produced by WildBrain Spark Studios, a subsidiary of WildBrain that produces original content for their WildBrain Spark network. However, the videos were not made available to YouTube users in the United States until 2021.

In August 2021, it was announced that Cartoon Network licensed the series for broadcast on US television.

=== Reboot and specials ===
In September 2021, WildBrain announced the production of five new 45-minute specials based on the franchise for Family Jr. These specials were the first Caillou-related media to be produced in CGI animation, and focused on Christmas, Halloween, Family Day, summer vacation and National Anti-Bullying Day. The specials were produced by WildBrain Studios, with animation provided by IoM Media Ventures.

In June 2022, WildBrain announced they teamed with Comcast's streaming platform, Peacock, to produce a new series of the show, consisting of 52 11-minute episodes to go along with those specials. It was set to premiere in 2023, with IoM also providing animation production as the specials are. Despite the specials being released on Peacock, it would later be confirmed to stream on February 15, 2024.

The first special: Rosie the Giant, which focuses on the effects of bullying, simultaneously premiered in Canada and the United States on Family Jr. and Peacock respectively on July 10, 2022.

The second special: Adventures with Grandma and Grandpa, which focuses on Caillou visiting his grandparents for a sleepover at their beach house, premiered on Peacock on August 25, 2022.

The third special: The Bravest Wolf Boy, which focuses on Halloween, premiered on Peacock on October 15, 2022.

The fourth special: The Silver Knight, which focuses on imaginative play, premiered on Peacock on November 13, 2022.

The fifth special, Caillou's Perfect Christmas, which focuses on Christmas, premiered on Peacock on December 2, 2022.

== See also ==
- Barney & Friends - another preschool series that also faced severe backlash
- List of television shows notable for negative reception
