= List of Z-Cars episodes =

This is an episode list for the British television series Z-Cars. The series was aired on BBC One, between 1962 and 1978 (except 1966). Many of the episodes are now missing from the BBC archives.

== Series overview ==
Series	Episodes	Premiered:	Ended:	Status:
1	31	2 January 1962	31 July 1962	12 Missing
2	42	19 September 1962	3 July 1963	26 Missing
3	42	4 September 1963	24 June 1964	5 Missing
4	43	9 September 1964	30 June 1965	15 Missing
5	12	5 October 1965	21 December 1965	9 Missing
6	416	6 March 1967	24 June 1971	308 Missing
7	115	2 August 1971	2 July 1973	82 Missing
8	33	22 October 1973	3 June 1974	5 Missing
9	31	9 September 1974	12 May 1975	Complete
10	13	5 January 1976	29 March 1976	Complete
11	13	5 April 1977	5 July 1977	Complete
12	13	28 June 1978	20 September 1978	Complete

== Series 1 (1962) ==
No.	Original air date (UK)	Episode title	Episode status
1	2 January 1962	Four of a Kind	Exists
2	9 January 1962	Limping Rabbit	Exists
3	16 January 1962	Handle With Care	Exists
4	23 January 1962	Stab in the Dark	Exists
5	30 January 1962	Big Catch	Exists
6	6 February 1962	Friday Night	Exists
7	13 February 1962	Suspended	Exists
8	20 February 1962	Family Feud	Exists
9	27 February 1962	Fire !	Missing
10	6 March 1962	Threats and Menaces	Missing
11	13 March 1962	Jail Break	Missing
12	20 March 1962	What Kind Of Hero	Missing
13	27 March 1962	Sudden Death	Missing
14	3 April 1962	Found Abandoned	Exists
15	10 April 1962	The Best Days	Exists
16	17 April 1962	Invisible Enemy	Exists
17	24 April 1962	Down And Out	Exists
18	1 May 1962	Further Enquiries	Exists
19	8 May 1962	Winner Take All	Missing
20	15 May 1962	People's Property	Exists
21	22 May 1962	Hi-Jack !	Exists
22	29 May 1962	Incident Reported	Exists
23	5 June 1962	Never On Wednesdays	Missing
24	12 June 1962	Day Trip	Missing
25	19 June 1962	Affray	Exists
26	26 June 1962	Contraband	Exists
27	3 July 1962	Teamwork	Missing
28	10 July 1962	Appearance in Court	Exists
29	17 July 1962	Assault	Missing
30	24 July 1962	Sunday Morning	Missing
31	31 July 1962	Unconditional Surrender	Missing

== Series 2 (1962–1963) ==
No.	Original air date (UK)	Episode title	Episode status
1	19 September 1962	On Watch – Newtown	Exists
2	26 September 1962	Full Remission	Exists
3	3 October 1962	Truth Or Dare	Exists
4	10 October 1962	Information Received	Exists
5	17 October 1962	Friendly Relations	Exists
6	24 October 1962	Corroboration	Exists
7	31 October 1962	The Thin Girl	Missing
8	7 November 1962	Johnny Sailor	Missing
9	14 November 1962	Person Unknown	Exists
10	21 November 1962	Ambush	Exists
11	28 November 1962	Known to the Police	Missing
12	5 December 1962	The Navigators	Missing
13	12 December 1962	Business Trip	Missing
14	19 December 1962	Five Whistles	Missing
15	26 December 1962	Search	Missing
16	2 January 1963	All Up By Seven	Missing
17	9 January 1963	Trumpet Voluntary	Missing
18	16 January 1963	Five and a Match	Missing
19	23 January 1963	The Hitch-Hiker	Missing
20	30 January 1963	A Simple Case	Missing
21	6 February 1963	Act Of Vengeance	Missing
22	13 February 1963	The Listeners	Missing
23	20 February 1963	The Main Chance	Missing
24	27 February 1963	Follow My Leader	Missing
25	6 March 1963	Members Only	Missing
26	13 March 1963	Matter Of Conviction	Missing
27	20 March 1963	The Bad Lad	Missing
28	27 March 1963	Enquiry	Missing
29	3 April 1963	Pay By Results	Missing
30	10 April 1963	The Peterman	Missing
31	17 April 1963	The Birds of the Air	Exists
32	24 April 1963	Train Of Events	Exists
33	1 May 1963	By The Book	Exists
34	8 May 1963	Nothing Serious	Missing
35	15 May 1963	Alarm Call	Missing
36	22 May 1963	A Try By Weir	Missing
37	29 May 1963	Quiet Confidence	Exists
38	5 June 1963	Scare	Exists
39	12 June 1963	Caught by the Ears	Exists
40	19 June 1963	Come on the Lads	Missing
41	26 June 1963	The Whizzers	Exists
42	3 July 1963	Police Work	Exists

== Series 3 (1963–1964) ==
No.	Original air date (UK)	Episode title	Episode status
1	4 September 1963	Lucky Accident	Exists
2	11 September 1963	Made For Each Other	Exists
3	18 September 1963	A La Carte	Exists
4	26 September 1963	Light The Blue Paper	Exists
5	2 October 1963	A Quiet Night	Missing
6	9 October 1963	Hit And Run	Exists
7	16 October 1963	Hide – And Go Seek	Exists
8	23 October 1963	The Kiter	Exists
9	30 October 1963	Special Duty	Missing
10	6 November 1963	Remembrance of a Guest	Exists
11	13 November 1963	Daylight Robbery	Missing
12	20 November 1963	Running Milligan	Missing
13	27 November 1963	Choose Your Partners	Exists
14	4 December 1963	Tuesday Afternoon	Exists
15	11 December 1963	Supper in the Morning	Exists
16	18 December 1963	Wait For It	Exists
17	25 December 1963	It Never Rains ...	Exists
18	1 January 1964	.. And A Happy New Year	Exists
19	8 January 1964	Happy-Go-Lucky	Exists
20	15 January 1964	Promise Made	Exists
21	22 January 1964	I Mean..Where Does It Stop?	Exists
22	29 January 1964	A Stroll Along The Sands	Exists
23	5 February 1964	No Malice	Exists
24	12 February 1964	Profit By Their Example	Exists
25	19 February 1964	A Question Of Storage	Exists
26	26 February 1964	Fun And Games	Exists
27	4 March 1964	A Man...Like Yourself	Exists
28	11 March 1964	A Straight Deal	Exists
29	18 March 1964	Happy Families	Exists
30	25 March 1964	Inside Job	Exists
31	1 April 1964	Clues Are What You Think	Exists
32	8 April 1964	The Whole Truth ...	Exists
33	22 April 1964	Whistle, And Come Home	Exists
34	29 April 1964	First Class Citizen	Exists
35	6 May 1964	Seconds Away	Exists
36	13 May 1964	Centre Of Disturbance	Exists
37	20 May 1964	You Get All Kinds	Exists
38	27 May 1964	Happy Birthday	Exists
39	3 June 1964	Somebody ... Help	Missing
40	10 June 1964	Cage Until Tame	Exists
41	17 June 1964	Family Reunion	Exists
42	24 June 1964	A Place Of Safety	Exists

== Series 4 (1964–1965) ==
No.	Original air date (UK)	Episode title	Episode status
1	9 September 1964	The Dark Side of the Road	Missing
2	16 September 1964	What A Main Event !	Exists
3	23 September 1964	Finders Keepers	Exists
4	30 September 1964	Lucky Partners	Missing
5	7 October 1964	Soft Spot	Missing
6	14 October 1964	Somebody Said ...	Exists
7	21 October 1964	Charity Begins ...	Exists
8	28 October 1964	The Hunch	Exists
9	4 November 1964	Two in the Bush	Exists
10	11 November 1964	Welcome Home, Jigger	Missing
11	18 November 1964	In A Day's Work	Exists
12	25 November 1964	No Stone Unturned	Exists
13	2 December 1964	You Pays Your Money	Exists
14	9 December 1964	One Day in Spring Street	Missing
15	16 December 1964	Bring Back The Cat	Missing
16	23 December 1964	If He Runs – Grab Him	Missing
17	30 December 1964	First Foot	Exists
18	6 January 1965	Think On	Missing
19	13 January 1965	The Luck of the Game	Missing
20	20 January 1965	I Love You Bonzo	Exists
21	27 January 1965	Brotherly Love	Exists
22	3 February 1965	A Matter Of Give And Take	Exists
23	10 February 1965	Give A Dog A Name	Missing
24	17 February 1965	The Long Spoon	Missing
25	24 February 1965	Teething Trouble	Missing
26	3 March 1965	A Shame To Take The Money	Missing
27	10 March 1965	Window Dressing	Exists
28	17 March 1965	Partners	Exists
29	24 March 1965	The Fanatics	Exists
30	31 March 1965	You Got To Have Class	Exists
31	7 April 1965	The Mice Will Play	Exists
32	14 April 1965	Sound An Alarm	Exists
33	21 April 1965	The Soft Game	Exists
34	28 April 1965	Snakes Alive	Exists
35	5 May 1965	Suspected Murder	Exists
36	12 May 1965	The Share-Out	Exists
37	19 May 1965	Checkmate	Exists
38	26 May 1965	Another Fairy Tale	Exists
39	2 June 1965	Market Square	Exists
40	9 June 1965	Error Of Judgement	Missing
41	16 June 1965	Under Cover	Exists
42	23 June 1965	One Good Turn	Missing
43	30 June 1965	Warning Shots	Exists

== Series 5 (1965) ==
No.	Original air date (UK)	Episode title	Episode status
1	5 October 1965	With A Pin	Missing
2	12 October 1965	Wilful Destruction	Missing
3	19 October 1965	Cop And Blow	Missing
4	26 October 1965	The Hard-Face Grabber	Missing
5	2 November 1965	Inspection	Exists
6	9 November 1965	Routine Inquiries	Missing
7	16 November 1965	A Morning's Sport	Missing
8	23 November 1965	Contrary To Regulations	Exists
9	30 November 1965	The Good Life	Missing
10	7 December 1965	Celebration	Missing
11	14 December 1965	But The Crying ...	Exists
12	21 December 1965	That's The Way It Is	Missing

== Series 6 (1967–1971) ==
No.	Original air date (UK)	Episode title	Episode status
1	6 March 1967	I Don't Want Evidence : 1	Missing
2	7 March 1967	I Don't Want Evidence : 2	Missing
3	13 March 1967	Ever Seen A Happy Cop : 1	Missing
4	14 March 1967	Ever Seen A Happy Cop : 2	Missing
5	20 March 1967	You Want 'Em – You Find 'Em : 1	Missing
6	21 March 1967	You Want 'Em – You Find 'Em : 2	Missing
7	27 March 1967	The Great Fur Robbery : 1	Missing
8	28 March 1967	The Great Fur Robbery : 2	Missing
9	3 April 1967	Gelignite : 1	Missing
10	4 April 1967	Gelignite : 2	Missing
11	10 April 1967	All They Have To Do Is Spend It : 1	Missing
12	11 April 1967	All They Have To Do Is Spend It : 2	Missing
13	17 April 1967	Who Said Anything About The Law 1	Missing
14	18 April 1967	Who Said Anything About The Law 2;	Missing
15	24 April 1967	Standard Procedure : 1	Missing
16	25 April 1967	Standard Procedure : 2	Missing
17	1 May 1967	The Nesbitts Are Back : 1	Missing
18	2 May 1967	The Nesbitts Are Back : 2	Missing
19	8 May 1967	Finch And Sons : 1	Exists
20	9 May 1967	Finch And Sons : 2	Missing
21	15 May 1967	When Did You Last See Your Father? 1	Missing
22	16 May 1967	When Did You Last See Your Father? 2	Missing
23	22 May 1967	When Did You Last See Your Father? 3	Missing
24	23 May 1967	When Did You Last See Your Father? 4	Missing
25	29 May 1967	Sheena : 1	Missing
26	30 May 1967	Sheena : 2	Missing
27	5 June 1967	She's Not Yours, She's Mine : 1	Exists
28	6 June 1967	She's Not Yours, She's Mine : 2	Exists
29	12 June 1967	The Placer : 1	Exists
30	13 June 1967	The Placer : 2	Exists
31	19 June 1967	Don't Wrap It Up, I'll Take It With Me : 1	Exists
32	20 June 1967	Don't Wrap It Up, I'll Take It With Me : 2	Exists
33	26 June 1967	I Never Mean't To Drop Him : 1	Exists
34	27 June 1967	I Never Mean't To Drop Him : 2	Exists
35	3 July 1967	Never Give A Copper An Even Break: 1	Exists
36	4 July 1967	Never Give A Copper An Even Break : 2	Exists
37	10 July 1967	It Was Doing Nothing : 1	Exists
38	11 July 1967	It Was Doing Nothing : 2	Exists
39	17 July 1967	The Sledgehammer and the Nut : 1	Exists
40	18 July 1967	The Sledgehammer and the Nut : 2	Exists
41	24 July 1967	All Through The Night : 1	Exists
42	25 July 1967	All Through The Night : 2	Exists
43	31 July 1967	Prejudice : 1	Exists
44	1 August 1967	Prejudice : 2	Exists
45	7 August 1967	Boy : 1	Exists
46	8 August 1967	Boy : 2	Exists
47	14 August 1967	Play It Hot, Play It Cool : 1	Exists
48	15 August 1967	Play It Hot, Play It Cool : 2	Exists
49	21 August 1967	The Great Art Robbery : 1	Exists
50	22 August 1967	The Great Art Robbery : 2	Exists
51	28 August 1967	First on the Scene : 1	Exists
52	29 August 1967	First on the Scene : 2	Exists
53	4 September 1967	It's Easy Once You Know How : 1	Exists
54	5 September 1967	It's Easy Once You Know How : 2	Exists
55	11 September 1967	If I Can't Have Him : 1	Exists
56	12 September 1967	If I Can't Have Him : 2	Exists
57	18 September 1967	A Litte Bit Of Respect : 1	Exists
58	19 September 1967	A Litte Bit Of Respect : 2	Exists
59	25 September 1967	Calling The Tune : 1	Missing
60	26 September 1967	Calling The Tune : 2	Missing
61	2 October 1967	Sauce for the Goose : 1	Missing
62	3 October 1967	Sauce for the Goose : 2	Missing
63	9 October 1967	The Nose On Your Face : 1	Missing
64	10 October 1967	The Nose On Your Face : 2	Missing
65	16 October 1967	A Handful Of Dust : 1	Missing
66	17 October 1967	A Handful Of Dust : 2	Missing
67	23 October 1967	All in a Day's Work : 1	Missing
68	24 October 1967	All in a Day's Work : 2	Missing
69	30 October 1967	Invasion Of Privacy : 1	Missing
70	31 October 1967	Invasion Of Privacy : 2	Missing
71	6 November 1967	Granny The Swings : 1	Missing
72	7 November 1967	Granny The Swings : 2	Missing
73	13 November 1967	Saturday Night Was Murder : 1	Missing
74	14 November 1967	Saturday Night Was Murder : 2	Missing
75	20 November 1967	They're Not Supposed ToDo That – Are They? : 1	Missing
76	21 November 1967	They're Not Supposed ToDo That – Are They ? : 2	Missing
77	27 November 1967	The Victim : 1	Missing
78	28 November 1967	The Victim : 2	Missing
79	4 December 1967	Too Quiet For Sunday : 1	Missing
80	5 December 1967	Too Quiet For Sunday : 2	Missing
81	11 December 1967	A Right To Live : 1	Missing
82	12 December 1967	A Right To Live : 2	Missing
83	18 December 1967	The Collector : 1	Missing
84	19 December 1967	The Collector : 2	Missing
85	25 December 1967	Family Affair : 1	Missing
86	26 December 1967	Family Affair : 2	Missing
87	1 January 1968	Should Auld Acquaintance : 1	Missing
88	2 January 1968	Should Auld Acquaintance : 2	Missing
89	8 January 1968	You Can't Win Em All : 1	Missing
90	9 January 1968	You Can't Win Em All : 2	Missing
91	15 January 1968	Take It with a Pinch Of Salt : 1	Missing
92	16 January 1968	Take It with a Pinch Of Salt : 2	Missing (some insert rushes exist)
93	22 January 1968	Nothing To Report : 1	Missing
94	23 January 1968	Nothing To Report : 2	Missing
95	29 January 1968	Inside Information : 1	Missing
96	30 January 1968	Inside Information : 2	Missing
97	5 February 1968	Honour Among Thieves : 1	Missing
98	6 February 1968	Honour Among Thieves : 2	Missing
99	12 February 1968	Aren't Policemen Wonderful : 1	Missing
100	13 February 1968	Aren't Policemen Wonderful : 2	Missing
101	19 February 1968	Out of the Frying Pan : 1	Missing
102	20 February 1968	Out of the Frying Pan : 2	Missing
103	26 February 1968	What D'Yer Mean – Charity? : 1	Missing
104	27 February 1968	What D'Yer Mean – Charity? : 2	Missing
105	4 March 1968	Person To Person : 1	Missing
106	5 March 1968	Person To Person : 2	Missing
107	11 March 1968	A Hobby You Might Say : 1	Missing
108	12 March 1968	A Hobby You Might Say : 2	Missing
109	18 March 1968	Hudson's Way : 1	Missing
110	19 March 1968	Hudson's Way : 2	Missing
111	25 March 1968	Blind Alley : 1	Missing
112	26 March 1968	Blind Alley : 2	Missing
113	1 April 1968	The Saint Of Concrete Canyon : 1	Missing
114	2 April 1968	The Saint Of Concrete Canyon : 2	Missing
115	8 April 1968	Criminal Type : 1	Missing
116	9 April 1968	Criminal Type : 2	Missing
117	15 April 1968	The Man Who Was Inspector Todd : 1	Missing
118	16 April 1968	The Man Who Was Inspector Todd : 2	Missing
119	22 April 1968	Some Girls Pick 'Em : 1	Missing
120	23 April 1968	Some Girls Pick 'Em : 2	Missing
121	29 April 1968	The Battleground : 1	Missing
122	30 April 1968	The Battleground : 2	Missing
123	6 May 1968	The Witness : 1	Missing
124	7 May 1968	The Witness : 2	Missing
125	13 May 1968	The Guilty Ones : 1	Missing
126	14 May 1968	The Guilty Ones : 2	Missing
127	20 May 1968	At Least You Know You've Tried: 1	Missing
128	21 May 1968	At Least You Know You've Tried: 2	Missing
129	27 May 1968	Two's A Pair : 1	Missing
130	28 May 1968	Two's A Pair : 2	Missing
131	3 June 1968	Tomorrow's Another Day : 1	Missing
132	4 June 1968	Tomorrow's Another Day : 2	Missing
133	10 June 1968	Who Was That Lady ? : 1	Missing
134	11 June 1968	Who Was That Lady ? : 2	Missing
135	17 June 1968	Talk Your Way Out Of That : 1	Missing
136	18 June 1968	Talk Your Way Out Of That : 2	Missing
137	8 July 1968	Application : 1	Missing
138	9 July 1968	Application : 2	Missing
139	15 July 1968	The Luck of the Irish : 1	Missing
140	16 July 1968	The Luck of the Irish : 2	Missing
141	22 July 1968	A Kind Of Proof : 1	Missing
142	23 July 1968	A Kind Of Proof : 2	Missing
143	29 July 1968	A Matter For Thought : 1	Missing
144	30 July 1968	A Matter For Thought : 2	Missing
145	5 August 1968	Some Kind Of Nut : 1	Missing
146	6 August 1968	Some Kind Of Nut : 2	Missing
147	12 August 1968	He Must Be Up To No Good : 1	Missing
148	13 August 1968	He Must Be Up To No Good : 2	Missing
149	19 August 1968	It's A Sort Of Game : 1	Missing
150	20 August 1968	It's A Sort Of Game : 2	Missing
151	26 August 1968	Anyone Can Make A Mistake : 1	Missing
152	27 August 1968	Anyone Can Make A Mistake : 2	Missing
153	2 September 1968	Attack : 1	Missing
154	3 September 1968	Attack : 2	Missing
155	9 September 1968	You Worry Too Much, Charlie : 1	Missing
156	10 September 1968	You Worry Too Much, Charlie : 2	Missing
157	16 September 1968	Punch-Up : 1	Missing
158	17 September 1968	Punch-Up : 2	Missing
159	23 September 1968	More Ways Of Killing The Cat : 1	Missing
160	24 September 1968	More Ways Of Killing The Cat : 2	Missing
161	30 September 1968	No Charge for the Estimate : 1	Missing
162	1 October 1968	No Charge for the Estimate : 2	Missing
163	7 October 1968	The Paperchase : 1	Missing
164	8 October 1968	The Paperchase : 2	Missing
165	14 October 1968	The Vigilance : 1	Missing
166	15 October 1968	The Vigilance : 2	Missing
167	21 October 1968	The Tip-Off : 1	Missing
168	22 October 1968	The Tip-Off : 2	Missing
169	28 October 1968	Prevention Is Better : 1	Missing
170	29 October 1968	Prevention Is Better : 2	Missing
171	4 November 1968	Special Relationship : 1	Missing
172	5 November 1968	Special Relationship : 2	Missing
173	11 November 1968	A Proper George Washington : 1	Missing
174	12 November 1968	A Proper George Washington : 2	Missing
175	18 November 1968	I Know My Coppers : 1	Missing
176	19 November 1968	I Know My Coppers : 2	Missing
177	25 November 1968	Follow The Form : 1	Missing
178	26 November 1968	Follow The Form : 2	Missing
179	2 December 1968	Breakdown: 1	Missing
180	3 December 1968	Breakdown: 2	Missing
181	9 December 1968	Will He.. Won't He? :1	Missing
182	10 December 1968	Will He.. Won't He? :2	Missing
183	16 December 1968	Dead End : 1	Missing
184	17 December 1968	Dead End : 2	Missing
185	23 December 1968	Blame It On Father Christmas : 1	Missing
186	24 December 1968	Blame It On Father Christmas : 2	Missing
187	30 December 1968	For Auld Lang Syne : 1	Missing
188	31 December 1968	For Auld Lang Syne : 2	Missing
189	6 January 1969	Unidentified Marks : 1	Exists
190	7 January 1969	Unidentified Marks : 2	Missing
191	13 January 1969	Picture Of Guilt : 1	Missing
192	14 January 1969	Picture Of Guilt : 2	Missing
193	20 January 1969	It Works Both Ways : 1	Missing
194	21 January 1969	It Works Both Ways : 2	Missing
195	27 January 1969	Alibi : 1	Missing
196	28 January 1969	Alibi : 2	Missing
197	3 February 1969	Lost Property : 1	Missing
198	4 February 1969	Lost Property : 2	Missing
199	10 February 1969	Fear Or Favour : 1	Missing
200	11 February 1969	Fear Or Favour : 2	Missing
201	17 February 1969	The Lonely Place : 1	Missing
202	18 February 1969	The Lonely Place : 2	Missing
203	24 February 1969	Foggy Night : 1	Missing
204	25 February 1969	Foggy Night : 2	Missing
205	3 March 1969	The Soft Touch : 1	Missing
206	4 March 1969	The Soft Touch : 2	Missing
207	10 March 1969	Special Duty : 1	Missing
208	11 March 1969	Special Duty : 2	Missing
209	17 March 1969	One End of The Road : 1	Missing
210	18 March 1969	One End of the Road : 2	Missing
211	24 March 1969	Welcome To Newtown : 1	Exists
212	25 March 1969	Welcome To Newtown : 2	Exists
213	31 March 1969	All The Birds of the Air : 1	Missing
214	1 April 1969	All The Birds of the Air : 2	Missing
215	7 April 1969	Carbon Copy : 1	Missing
216	8 April 1969	Carbon Copy : 2	Missing
217	14 April 1969	Not A Bad Lad Really : 1	Missing
218	15 April 1969	Not A Bad Lad Really : 2	Missing
219	21 April 1969	Snout : 1	Missing
220	22 April 1969	Snout : 2	Missing
221	28 April 1969	The Exiles : 1	Missing
222	29 April 1969	The Exiles : 2	Missing
223	5 May 1969	It's Not Against The Law : 1	Missing
224	6 May 1969	It's Not Against The Law : 2	Missing
225	12 May 1969	Hit And Run : 1	Missing
226	13 May 1969	Hit And Run : 2	Missing
227	19 May 1969	One Of Our Own : 1	Missing
228	20 May 1969	One Of Our Own : 2	Missing
229	26 May 1969	No Objection To Bail : 1	Missing
230	27 May 1969	No Objection To Bail : 2	Missing
231	2 June 1969	Sunday...Sunday... : 1	Exists
232	3 June 1969	Sunday...Sunday... : 2	Missing
233	9 June 1969	Double Game : 1	Missing
234	10 June 1969	Double Game : 2	Missing
235	16 June 1969	Spare The Rod : 1	Missing
236	17 June 1969	Spare The Rod : 2	Missing
237	7 July 1969	You've Got To Keep Them Talking : 1	Missing
238	8 July 1969	You've Got To Keep Them Talking : 2	Missing
239	14 July 1969	In Need Of Care : 1	Exists
240	15 July 1969	In Need Of Care : 2	Exists
241	21 July 1969	From Information Received : 1	Exists
242	22 July 1969	From Information Received : 2	Exists
243	28 July 1969	Have A Go, Joe : 1	Exists
244	29 July 1969	Have A Go, Joe : 2	Exists
245	4 August 1969	According To Plan : 1	Exists
246	5 August 1969	According To Plan : 2	Exists
247	11 August 1969	The Shooter : 1	Exists
248	12 August 1969	The Shooter : 2	Exists
249	18 August 1969	Dear Old Golden Rule Days : 1	Exists
250	19 August 1969	Dear Old Golden Rule Days : 2	Exists
251	25 August 1969	Allegation : 1	Exists
252	26 August 1969	Allegation : 2	Exists
253	1 September 1969	You Can't Trust Anyone : 1	Exists
254	2 September 1969	You Can't Trust Anyone : 2	Missing
255	8 September 1969	The Dog Lover : 1	Exists
256	9 September 1969	The Dog Lover : 2	Exists
257	15 September 1969	It's Been A Long Time : 1	Exists
258	16 September 1969	It's Been A Long Time : 2	Exists
259	22 September 1969	No Time To Think : 1	Missing
260	23 September 1969	No Time To Think : 2	Missing
261	29 September 1969	Not That Sort Of Policeman : 1	Missing
262	30 September 1969	Not That Sort Of Policeman : 2	Missing
263	6 October 1969	A Place Of Safety : 1	Missing
264	7 October 1969	A Place Of Safety : 2	Missing
265	13 October 1969	Lost And Found : 1	Missing
266	14 October 1969	Lost And Found : 2	Missing
267	20 October 1969	Gyppo : 1	Missing
268	21 October 1969	Gyppo : 2	Missing
269	28 October 1969	Give A Dog A Bad Name : 1	Missing
270	29 October 1969	Give A Dog A Bad Name : 2	Missing
271	3 November 1969	Nobody Loves Us : 1	Missing
272	4 November 1969	Nobody Loves Us : 2	Missing
273	10 November 1969	A Right Cock-n-Bull Story : 1	Missing
274	11 November 1969	A Right Cock-n-Bull Story : 2	Missing
275	17 November 1969	Two for the Record : 1	Exists
276	18 November 1969	Two for the Record : 2	Exists
277	24 November 1969	Quiet Day : 1	Missing
278	25 November 1969	Quiet Day : 2	Missing
279	1 December 1969	None The Worse : 1	Missing
280	2 December 1969	None The Worse : 2	Missing
281	8 December 1969	None The Worse: 3	Missing
282	9 December 1969	None The Worse: 4	Missing
283	15 December 1969	Barricade : 1	Missing
284	16 December 1969	Barricade : 2	Missing
285	22 December 1969	The Best Day of the Year : 1	Missing
286	23 December 1969	The Best Day of the Year : 2	Missing
287	29 December 1969	Score To Settle : 1	Missing
288	30 December 1969	Score To Settle : 2	Missing
289	5 January 1970	Tune on a Bent Trumpet : 1	Missing
290	6 January 1970	Tune on a Bent Trumpet : 2	Missing
291	12 January 1970	They Call It Justice : 1	Missing
292	13 January 1970	They Call It Justice : 2	Missing
293	19 January 1970	No Questions Asked : 1	Missing
294	20 January 1970	No Questions Asked : 2	Missing
295	26 January 1970	Threats And Menaces : 1	Missing
296	27 January 1970	Threats And Menaces : 2	Missing
297	2 February 1970	Lost : 1	Missing
298	3 February 1970	Lost : 2	Missing
299	9 February 1970	Infamous Conduct : 1	Missing
300	10 February 1970	Infamous Conduct : 2	Missing
301	16 February 1970	All Coppers Are Nanas : 1	Missing
302	17 February 1970	All Coppers Are Nanas : 2	Missing
303	23 February 1970	Nice Bit O' Stuff : 1	Missing
304	24 February 1970	Nice Bit O' Stuff : 2	Missing
305	2 March 1970	For Old Time's Sake : 1	Missing
306	3 March 1970	For Old Time's Sake : 2	Missing
307	9 March 1970	A Day Like Every Day : 1	Exists
308	10 March 1970	A Day Like Every Day : 2	Exists
309	16 March 1970	Eleanor Rigby Slept Here : 1	Exists
310	17 March 1970	Eleanor Rigby Slept Here : 2	Exists
311	23 March 1970	A Right Tommy Kelly Do : 1	Exists
312	24 March 1970	A Right Tommy Kelly Do : 2	Exists
313	6 April 1970	Cruising For Burglars : 1	Exists
314	7 April 1970	Cruising For Burglars : 2	Exists
315	13 April 1970	In And Out : 1	Exists
316	14 April 1970	In And Out : 2	Exists
317	20 April 1970	In And Out : 3	Exists
318	21 April 1970	In And Out : 4	Exists
319	27 April 1970	It's Only A Game : 1	Exists
320	28 April 1970	It's Only A Game : 2	Exists
321	4 May 1970	A Quiet Sort Of Lad : 1	Exists
322	5 May 1970	A Quiet Sort Of Lad : 2	Exists
323	11 May 1970	Night Out : 1	Exists
324	12 May 1970	Night Out : 2	Exists
325	18 May 1970	One Bad Apple : 1	Exists
326	19 May 1970	One Bad Apple : 2	Exists
327	25 May 1970	If You Can't Beat 'Em : 1	Exists
328	26 May 1970	If You Can't Beat 'Em : 2	Exists
329	1 June 1970	Couldn't Happen to a Nicer Girl : 1	Exists
330	2 June 1970	Couldn't Happen to a Nicer Girl : 2	Exists
331	6 July 1970	A Couple Of Comic Turns : 1	Exists
332	7 July 1970	A Couple Of Comic Turns : 2	Exists
333	13 July 1970	By Bread Alone : 1	Exists
334	14 July 1970	By Bread Alone : 2	Exists
335	20 July 1970	The Helpers : 1	Exists
336	21 July 1970	The Helpers : 2	Exists
338	27 July 1970	Missile Mile : 1	Exists
337	28 July 1970	Missile Mile : 2	Exists
339	3 August 1970	I Wouldn't Give You Tuppence for Your Old Watch Chain : 1	Exists
340	4 August 1970	I Wouldn't Give You Tuppence for Your Old Watch Chain : 2	Exists
341	10 August 1970	Weekend With Sally : 1	Exists
342	11 August 1970	Weekend With Sally : 2	Exists
343	17 August 1970	Bottoms Up for the Walking Dead : 1	Exists
344	18 August 1970	Bottoms Up for the Walking Dead : 2	Exists
345	24 August 1970	Give And Take : 1	Exists
346	25 August 1970	Give And Take : 2	Exists
347	7 September 1970	Who's Sylvia Then : 1	Exists
348	8 September 1970	Who's Sylvia Then : 2	Exists
349	14 September 1970	A Lot Of Fuss For 15 Quid : 1	Exists
350	15 September 1970	A Lot Of Fuss For 15 Quid : 2	Exists
351	21 September 1970	The Other Arm of the Law : 1	Exists
352	22 September 1970	The Other Arm of the Law : 2	Exists
353	28 September 1970	To Ray – Love Anne : 1	Exists
354	29 September 1970	To Ray – Love Anne : 2	Exists
355	5 October 1970	A Big Shadow : 1	Exists
356	6 October 1970	A Big Shadow : 2	Exists
357	12 October 1970	The Senior Partner : 1	Exists
358	13 October 1970	The Senior Partner : 2	Exists
359	19 October 1970	Talking to an Elephant : 1	Missing
360	20 October 1970	Talking to an Elephant : 2	Missing
361	26 October 1970	Off with the Motley : 1	Missing
362	27 October 1970	Off with the Motley : 2	Missing
363	2 November 1970	Whatever Happened to the Glory Boy ? : 1	Missing
364	3 November 1970	Whatever Happened to the Glory Boy ? : 2	Missing
365	9 November 1970	Have You Seen Davie Richards : 1	Missing
366	10 November 1970	Have You Seen Davie Richards : 2	Missing
367	16 November 1970	A Very High Rocket : 1	Missing
368	17 November 1970	A Very High Rocket : 2	Missing
369	23 November 1970	A Little Woman : 1	Missing
370	24 November 1970	A Little Woman : 2	Missing
371	30 November 1970	Stop Over : 1	Missing
372	1 December 1970	Stop Over : 2	Missing
373	7 December 1970	Strictly Cash : 1	Missing
374	8 December 1970	Strictly Cash : 2	Missing
375	14 December 1970	Playing For Keeps : 1	Missing
376	15 December 1970	Playing For Keeps : 2	Missing
377	21 December 1970	Christmas Is Coming : 1	Missing
378	22 December 1970	Christmas Is Coming : 2	Missing
379	29 December 1970	Let Nothing You Dismay	Missing
380	4 January 1971	Prevention : 1	Missing
381	5 January 1971	Prevention : 2	Missing
382	11 January 1971	Right Of Way : 1	Missing
383	12 January 1971	Right Of Way : 2	Missing
384	18 January 1971	Nobody Wins, Nobody Loses : 1	Missing
385	19 January 1971	Nobody Wins, Nobody Loses : 2	Missing
386	25 January 1971	By-Pass : 1	Missing
387	26 January 1971	By-Pass : 2	Missing
388	1 February 1971	Love's A Dead Lumber : 1	Missing
389	2 February 1971	Love's A Dead Lumber : 2	Missing
390	8 February 1971	The More We Are Together : 1	Missing
391	9 February 1971	The More We Are Together : 2	Missing
392	15 February 1971	Make Yourself at Home : 1	Missing
393	16 February 1971	Make Yourself at Home : 2	Missing
394	22 February 1971	Triangle Squared : 1	Missing
395	23 February 1971	Triangle Squared : 2	Missing
396	1 March 1971	Hold Up : 1	Missing
397	2 March 1971	Hold Up : 2	Missing
398	8 March 1971	The Snoozer : 1	Missing
399	9 March 1971	The Snoozer : 2	Missing
400	15 March 1971	Little Girl Lost : 1	Missing
401	16 March 1971	Little Girl Lost : 2	Missing
402	22 March 1971	Influence : 1	Missing
403	23 March 1971	Influence : 2	Missing
404	30 March 1971	Kid's Stuff	Missing
405	5 April 1971	It Can Get To Be A Habit : 1	Missing
406	6 April 1971	It Can Get To Be A Habit : 2	Missing
407	13 April 1971	Bad Tuesday	Missing
408	22 April 1971	System	Missing
409	29 April 1971	Say Two Hellos	Missing
410	6 May 1971	The Taker	Missing
411	13 May 1971	The Find	Missing
412	20 May 1971	Lawbreakers	Missing
413	27 May 1971	Cars	Missing
414	3 June 1971	Penny Wise	Missing
415	10 June 1971	No Job for a Woman	Missing
416	24 June 1971	Territory	Missing

== Series 7 (1971–1973) ==
No.	Original air date (UK)	Episode title	Episode status
1	2 August 1971	The Stone Standard : 1	Missing
2	3 August 1971	The Stone Standard : 2	Missing
3	9 August 1971	The Mystery : 1	Missing
4	10 August 1971	The Mystery : 2	Missing
5	16 August 1971	Nobody Hit Me : 1	Missing
6	17 August 1971	Nobody Hit Me : 2	Missing
7	23 August 1971	Dan Dan ... : 1	Missing
8	24 August 1971	Dan Dan ... : 2	Missing
9	31 August 1971	Funny Fellah	Missing
10	6 September 1971	Who's Your Friend ... ? : 1	Missing
11	7 September 1971	Who's Your Friend ... ? : 2	Missing
12	13 September 1971	Purely Medical Purposes : 1	Missing
13	14 September 1971	Purely Medical Purposes : 2	Missing
14	20 September 1971	Grandstand Finish : 1	Missing
15	21 September 1971	Grandstand Finish : 2	Missing
16	27 September 1971	Funny Creatures Women : 1	Missing
17	28 September 1971	Funny Creatures Women : 2	Missing
18	4 October 1971	The Dirty Job : 1	Missing
19	5 October 1971	The Dirty Job : 2	Missing
20	11 October 1971	Ding Dong : 1	Missing
21	12 October 1971	Ding Dong : 2	Missing
22	18 October 1971	Intrusion : 1	Missing
23	19 October 1971	Intrusion : 2	Missing
24	25 October 1971	Not Often We Have Visitors : 1	Missing
25	26 October 1971	Not Often We Have Visitors : 2	Missing
26	1 November 1971	Contact Man : 1	Missing
27	2 November 1971	Contact Man : 2	Missing
28	8 November 1971	Take Away : 1	Missing
29	9 November 1971	Take Away : 2	Missing
30	15 November 1971	Who Were You With ? : 1	Missing
31	16 November 1971	Who Were You With ? : 2	Missing
32	22 November 1971	Danny Boy's Home : 1	Missing
33	23 November 1971	Danny Boy's Home : 2	Missing
34	29 November 1971	Rules of the Game : 1	Missing
35	30 November 1971	Rules of the Game : 2	Missing
36	6 December 1971	The Wrong Odds : 1	Missing
38	7 December 1971	The Wrong Odds : 2	Missing
37	13 December 1971	The Horse Dealer : 1	Missing
39	14 December 1971	The Horse Dealer : 2	Missing
40	20 December 1971	Collation : 1	Missing
41	21 December 1971	Collation : 2	Missing
42	3 January 1972	Last Bus To Newtown	Missing
43	10 January 1972	Lynch	Missing
44	17 January 1972	Team Work	Missing
45	24 January 1972	The Attackers	Missing
46	31 January 1972	Retirement	Missing
47	14 February 1972	Promotion	Missing
48	21 February 1972	Canal	Missing
49	28 February 1972	Week Off	Missing
50	6 March 1972	Missing	Missing
51	10 April 1972	Quilley	Missing
52	17 April 1972	Tessa in the Woodpile	Missing
53	24 April 1972	Keep To Yourself	Missing
54	1 May 1972	Smoke	Missing
55	8 May 1972	Operation Ascalon	Missing
56	15 May 1972	Short Cut	Missing
57	22 May 1972	Hagger	Missing
58	29 May 1972	Playtime	Missing
59	5 June 1972	Sweet Girl	Missing
60	12 June 1972	Access	Missing
61	19 June 1972	Goss	Missing
62	10 July 1972	The Wolf and the Sheep : 1	Exists
63	11 July 1972	The Wolf and the Sheep : 2	Exists
64	17 July 1972	Forget It : 1	Exists
65	18 July 1972	Forget It : 2	Missing
66	24 July 1972	A Neighbour's Goods : 1	Exists
67	25 July 1972	A Neighbour's Goods : 2	Exists
68	31 July 1972	Loyalties : 1	Exists
69	1 August 1972	Loyalties : 2	Exists
70	7 August 1972	Relative Values : 1	Exists
71	8 August 1972	Relative Values : 2	Exists
72	14 August 1972	Not Good Enough : 1	Exists
73	15 August 1972	Not Good Enough : 2	Exists
74	21 August 1972	Breakage : 1	Exists
75	22 August 1972	Breakage : 2	Exists
76	11 September 1972	Connor	Exists
77	18 September 1972	The Team	Exists
78	25 September 1972	Witness	Exists
79	2 October 1972	Takes All Sorts	Exists
80	9 October 1972	Sins of the Father	Exists
81	16 October 1972	Damage	Exists
82	23 October 1972	Day Trip	Exists
83	30 October 1972	Public Relations	Exists
84	6 November 1972	Old Soldiers	Missing
85	13 November 1972	Diabolical Liberty	Exists
86	20 November 1972	Old Acquaintance	Exists
87	27 November 1972	The Legacy	Missing
88	4 December 1972	The Amateurs	Exists
89	11 December 1972	Hobo	Missing
90	18 December 1972	Old Lag	Missing
91	4 January 1973	Skinner	Missing
92	11 January 1973	Skin Game	Missing
93	18 January 1973	Backwater	Missing
94	25 January 1973	Big Jake	Missing
95	1 February 1973	Women at Work	Exists
96	8 February 1973	Jack The Dodger	Exists
97	15 February 1973	Miller	Exists
98	22 February 1973	Care	Exists
99	1 March 1973	Operation Watchdog	Missing
100	8 March 1973	Defection	Exists
101	15 March 1973	Invention	Missing
102	22 March 1973	Hard Man	Exists
103	29 March 1973	Domestic	Missing
104	5 April 1973	Pat	Exists
105	12 April 1973	Bowman	Exists
106	19 April 1973	The Lady and the Gentleman	Exists
107	30 April 1973	Suspicion	Missing
108	7 May 1973	Mileage	Missing
109	14 May 1973	Routine	Missing
110	21 May 1973	The Spike	Missing
111	4 June 1973	Hi-Jack	Missing
112	11 June 1973	Mother And Child	Missing
113	18 June 1973	Co-Operation	Missing
114	25 June 1973	No Proceedings	Missing
115	2 July 1973	Officer Material ... ?	Missing

== Series 8 (1973–1974) ==
No.	Original air date (UK)	Episode title	Episode status
1	22 October 1973	Inspector Lynch	Exists
2	29 October 1973	Nuisance	Exists
3	5 November 1973	Escape	Missing
4	12 November 1973	Cadet	Missing
5	19 November 1973	Break Up	Missing
6	26 November 1973	Stray Girl	Exists
7	3 December 1973	Pieces	Exists
8	10 December 1973	The Cinder Path	Exists
9	17 December 1973	Pressure Of Work	Exists
10	7 January 1974	Absence	Exists
11	14 January 1974	Losers	Exists
12	21 January 1974	In Police Hands	Exists
13	4 February 1974	Two Hundred Tartan Teddy Bears	Missing
14	11 February 1974	Joanna	Exists
15	18 February 1974	Pressure	Exists
16	25 February 1974	Waste	Exists
17	4 March 1974	Two Wise Monkeys	Exists
18	11 March 1974	Dinner Break	Missing
19	18 March 1974	Allegiance	Exists
20	25 March 1974	Rota	Exists
21	1 April 1974	Priority	Exists
22	8 April 1974	Background	Exists
23	22 April 1974	Turnabout	Exists
24	29 April 1974	Intruder	Exists
25	6 May 1974	Mugs	Exists
26	13 May 1974	Pastime	Exists
27	20 May 1974	Certain Parties	Exists
28	3 June 1974	Family	Exists

== Series 9 (1974–1975) ==
No.	Original air date (UK)	Episode title	Episode status
1	9 September 1974	Bits An' Bats	Exists
2	16 September 1974	Old Bones	Exists
3	30 September 1974	Mysteries	Exists
4	7 October 1974	Night Train	Exists
5	14 October 1974	Friends	Exists
6	28 October 1974	Gardens	Exists
7	4 November 1974	Quiet As The Grave	Exists
8	11 November 1974	Pursuit	Exists
9	18 November 1974	Have You Seen This Child	Exists
10	25 November 1974	Occupation	Exists
11	2 December 1974	Unnecessary Force	Exists
12	9 December 1974	The Bouncer	Exists
13	16 December 1974	House To House	Exists
14	6 January 1975	Boy in Blue	Exists
15	13 January 1975	Local Knowledge	Exists
16	20 January 1975	Innocent And Vulnerable	Exists
17	27 January 1975	Intervention	Exists
18	3 February 1975	Tonight And Every Night	Exists
19	10 February 1975	Transit	Exists
20	17 February 1975	Snouts	Exists
21	24 February 1975	Squatters	Exists
22	3 March 1975	Eviction	Exists
23	10 March 1975	Incitement	Exists
24	17 March 1975	Thanks But ... No Thanks	Exists
25	24 March 1975	Kronur	Exists
26	7 April 1975	Scapegoat	Exists
27	14 April 1975	Bit Of Business	Exists
28	21 April 1975	Distance	Exists
29	28 April 1975	Ritual	Exists
30	5 May 1975	Legacy	Exists
31	12 May 1975	A New Broom	Exists

== Series 10 (1976) ==
No.	Original air date (UK)	Episode title	Episode status
1	5 January 1976	Guns	Exists
2	12 January 1976	Manslaughter	Exists
3	19 January 1976	Prisoner	Exists
4	26 January 1976	The Frighteners	Exists
5	2 February 1976	Contact	Exists
6	9 February 1976	Kidnap	Exists
7	16 February 1976	Say Goodbye to the Horses	Exists
8	23 February 1976	A Preacher in Passing	Exists
9	1 March 1976	Nightwatch	Exists
10	8 March 1976	Ringers	Exists
11	15 March 1976	Fairground	Exists
12	22 March 1976	Hunch	Exists
13	29 March 1976	Scot Free	Exists

== Series 11 (1977) ==
No.	Original air date (UK)	Episode title	Episode status
1	5 April 1977	The Man Who Killed Songbirds	Exists
2	12 April 1977	Rage	Exists
3	19 April 1977	Guilt	Exists
4	26 April 1977	Transit	Exists
5	3 May 1977	Error Of Judgement	Exists
6	10 May 1977	Scavengers	Exists
7	17 May 1977	Fall Of Wiskers Castle	Exists
8	24 May 1977	Rip Off	Exists
9	31 May 1977	Quarry	Exists
10	14 June 1977	Attack	Exists
11	21 June 1977	Skeletons	Exists
12	28 June 1977	Domestic	Exists
13	5 July 1977	Juvenile	Exists

== Series 12 (1978) ==
No.	Original air date (UK)	Episode title	Episode status
1	28 June 1978	Driver	Exists
2	5 July 1978	Heavenly Host	Exists
3	12 July 1978	Debris	Exists
4	19 July 1978	Quilley on the Spot	Exists
5	26 July 1978	A Woman's Place	Exists
6	2 August 1978	Exposure	Exists
7	9 August 1978	Fast Freddie BA	Exists
8	16 August 1978	First Offender	Exists
9	23 August 1978	Deserter	Exists
10	30 August 1978	Rummage	Exists
11	6 September 1978	Prey	Exists
12	13 September 1978	Departures	Exists
13	20 September 1978	Pressure	Exists
