= Caillou (book series) =

Canadian series of children's books

- Author: Christine L'Heureux
- Illustrator: Hélène Desputeaux
- Country: Canada
- Language: French, English
- Publisher: Les Éditions Chouette
- Published: 1989

Caillou (French: [kaju]; stylized in lowercase) is a Canadian-French series of children's books. Beginning with a 1989 book written by Christine L'Heureux, the books also include materials created by illustrator and writer Hélène Desputeaux. The authorship of and revenues from the book series have been the subject of several disputes regarding the respective legal and financial rights of Desputeaux, L'Heureux, and the publisher Les Éditions Chouette.

== History ==
In 2013, Canada Post announced plans to issue a commemorative postage stamp featuring the character, but the stamp was not issued.

As of 2015, more than 15 million copies of books in the series had been sold worldwide since the inception of the series in 1989.

The books are the source material for a long-running children's television series produced from 1997 to 2011 on Teletoon (now Cartoon Network) in Canada and PBS Kids in the US and later on Peacock in 2024.
