= Hélène Desputeaux =

Canadian educator, writer and illustrator

- Born: July 10, 1959 (age 66); Quebec City, Quebec, Canada
- Occupation: Illustrator
- Notable work: Caillou (1989–present)
- Spouse: Michel Aubin
- Children: 2

Hélène Desputeaux (French: [elɛn depyto]; born July 10, 1959) is a Canadian educator, writer and illustrator from Quebec. With writer Christine L'Heureux, she created and illustrated the character Caillou, who has appeared in a series of children's books and a television series.

== Career ==
Desputeaux has produced more than 100 children's books. In 1995, she received the Médaille Raymond-Blais for her body of work.

Desputeaux and the publisher Éditions Chouette went to court to resolve a dispute over the ownership of the Caillou character. A Quebec arbitrator found that the character was jointly owned. This decision was reversed by the Quebec Court of Appeal, which found that the arbitrator could not rule on the question of copyright, but the appeal court's ruling was overturned by the Supreme Court of Canada.

=== Selected works ===
- The Emperor's New Clothes (1984), text by Hans Christian Andersen
- Purple, Green, and Yellow (1992), text by Robert Munsch
- Caillou, la petite soeur and Caillou, le petit pot, text by Joceline Sanschagrin; received the Mr. Christie's Book Award in 1993
- Where is Gah-Ning? (1994), text by Robert Munsch

== Personal life ==
Desputeaux married children's author Michel Aubin; they have two daughters.
