= Star Academy (disambiguation) =

Star Academy is a reality TV show created by Endemol.

Star Academy may also refer to:

== Versions of the television show ==
- Star Académie, Quebec, Canada
- Star Academy (Arabia), pan-Arab (based in Lebanon)
- Star Academy (Bulgarian TV series)
- Star Academy (Georgian TV series)
- Star Academy (French TV series)
- Star Academy (Greek TV series)

== Other ==
- STAR Academy (novel), a 2009 novel by Edward Kay

== See also ==
- North Star Academy (disambiguation)
