= Bum trilogy =

Book trilogy by Andy Griffiths

Bum Trilogy
- The Day My Bum Went Psycho (2001); Zombie Bums from Uranus (2003); Bumageddon: The Final Pongflict (2005)
- Author: Andy Griffiths
- Country: Australia
- Language: English
- Publisher: Pan Macmillan
- Published: 2001–05
- No. of books: 3

The Bum Trilogy consists of three books by Australian author Andy Griffiths: The Day My Bum Went Psycho (2001), Zombie Bums from Uranus (2003), and Bumageddon: The Final Pongflict (2005).The books are aimed at children aged around ten and contain much toilet humor.

Because the word bum has an alternate meaning in the United States, the book titles were changes to use butt instead. The third book is further renamed to Butt Wars: The Final Conflict.

Griffiths' reference guide to "prehistoric bumosaurs", What Bumosaur Is That?, was published in May 2007. It is not a part of the trilogy, although the book was mentioned in the trilogy.

A australian-canadian animated television series based on The Day My Bum Went Psycho, produced by Nelvana and Studio Moshi for Nine Network and Teletoon, release on 2013 to 2015.
