= The Day My Bum Went Psycho =

Novel by Andy Griffiths

- Author: Andy Griffiths
- Illustrator: Terry Denton
- Language: English
- Series: Bum trilogy
- Genre: Children's novel
- Publisher: Pan Books
- Publication date: 2001
- Publication place: Australia
- Media type: Hardback book
- Pages: 150
- ISBN: 0-330-36292-5
- OCLC: 53902628
- Followed by: Zombie Bums from Uranus

The Day My Bum Went Psycho is a novel for children by Australian author Andy Griffiths. "Bum" is a slang word used in many English-speaking countries for the buttocks; in North America the term "butt" is used instead, and the book is published there under the title The Day My Butt Went Psycho.

It is illustrated by Terry Denton, who also illustrated some of Andy Griffiths' other books, including the Just! series.

The Day My Butt Went Psycho! is a Canadian-Australian animated television series loosely based on the novel, and its sequels, first shown on Australian channel Nine Network in September 2013 and on Canadian channels Teletoon and Télétoon in June 2014.

== Plot summary ==
Zack Freeman's bum is constantly detaching itself from his body and running off. One night, when he follows his bum, he learns that there is a plot by bums to take over the world. Specifically, the bums plan to create a huge, worldwide fart by building up a massive quantity of methane gas in the "Bumcano". When the Bumcano blows, all humans will be rendered unconscious. While they are unconscious, the bums will seize their chance and switch places with their heads.

Fortunately, Zack meets the "Bum-hunter" Silas Sterne and his daughter, Eleanor, and is introduced to the realities of life in a world where bums are constantly a threat. To prevent the Bumcano eruption, the friends enlist the help of the Kisser, the Kicker, the Smacker and Ned Smelly. The characters encounter a variety of bum-related places and things, including the "Great Windy Desert", "flying bum squadrons", Stenchgantor The Great Unwiped Bum and the Great White Bum.

Naturally, every possible opportunity for toilet humour is milked in this book for children, which won a number of Children's Choice awards in Australia.

It is followed by Zombie Bums from Uranus (2003) and Bumageddon: The Final Pongflict (2005).

== Characters ==
- Zack Freeman – a twelve-year-old boy, at the centre of the novel.
- Deuce (Zack Freeman's "bum") – the recruiter of the midnight bum rally, threatening to fill a Bumcano and knocking every human out on Earth to rearrange the place of heads and bums. Zack's bum is shocked by finding out that the Great White Bum was lying about the rearrangements and ends up becoming Zack's best friend.
- Eleanor Sterne – a fierce bum fighter in her own right, Eleanor is determined to kill the Great White Bum after it killed her mother in a surprise attack on a family picnic when Eleanor was only five. Daughter of the legendary bum hunter, Silas Sterne. Eleanor is a friend of the B-team. Has a prosthetic or "artificial" bum.
- Silas Sterne – the bravest and most talented bum hunter in history. He is founder of Silas Sterne's Bum Fighting Academy. His wife was killed when he, her and his formidable daughter Eleanor were on a family picnic, after the Great White Bum uprising. Silas Sterne has hunted and captured some of the most dangerous bums ever. Silas was once a member of the famous B-team and a friend of Ned Smelly.
- Kicker – a violent bum fighter is highly skilled in the art of foot to bum combat. A member of the famous B-team, Kicker is always wanting to kick bums, rather than smack them or kiss them. He and the Kisser usually fight. Kicker is a huge man with a thick beard and the biggest feet ever. He wears Australian rules football shorts, jumper and boots. He always talks about kicking, bums and kicked bums.
- Smacker – a bum fighter, highly skilled in the art of hand to bum combat. A member of the famous B-team, Smacker is the most sensible member of the B-team, and good friend to Eleanor. She is a huge woman with black hair and has huge hands like baseball mitts. She wears an orange floral dress with short sleeves.
- Kisser – a charming bum fighter, highly skilled in the art of lip to bum combat and a member of the famous B-team. Kidnapped by rogue bums, and becoming a secret bum-sympathiser, who not only tried to sabotage the B-teams plans, but also attempted to kill the other members while climbing up the Bumcano. He is last seen being dragged down by giant maggots in the brown lake. Meanwhile, later in Zombie Bums from Uranus, he is known as the "Mutant Maggot Lord", and in Bumageddon as the "Mutant Mutant Zombie Blowfly Spew Lord" or "Mutant Spew Lord" for short.
- Ned Smelly – an ex-bum fighter, who got his name after his run in with Stenchgantor, the Great Unwiped Bum. He lives in a shack in the Great Windy Desert, feeding on needleweeds and stinkants. After eating anti-bum energy bars, his stench had disappeared. He dies in Bumageddon: The Final Pongflict when the Mutant Spew Lord shot him in the back.
- Captain Brown – a bum-shelter manager.
- Stenchgantor – also known as the Great Unwiped Bum, the Stenchgantor was the ugliest, wartiest, hairiest, stinkiest bum ever, until it was out-stenched by Zack's stinky bumcatcher socks. The only bum to have a nostril, rather than an eye, he lives in the Brown Forest, completely blind as it relies on its sense of smell to catch victims.
- The Great White Bum – an enormous bum, the evillest bum in history. Some say the Great White Bum was a mutant bum created by a side effect of a nuclear bum launcher. Others believe it was around for years. In his book, 'Chariots of the Bums', Eric Von Dunnycan (a parody of UFO enthusiast Erich von Däniken) claimed that it was a space traveller. It was forcibly removed from Earth by Zack Freeman, who sent it blasting into space.
- Judi and James Freeman – are Zack's parents who are first mentioned in The Day My Bum Went Psycho as travelling musicians. It is later revealed they are both bum-fighters in Zombie Bums from Uranus.

== Television series ==
A television series based on the books started airing on the Australian channel Nine Network and on the Canadian channels Teletoon and Télétoon on June 12, 2014.

== Live adaptation ==
On January 19, 2019, an adaptation written by author Dave Lowe premiered at Brisbane Arts Theatre. This two-act play features young performers in the roles.
