= Télétoon Rétro =

Former Canadian French television channel

- Final logo used from 2013 to 2015
- Country: Canada
- Broadcast area: Nationwide
- Headquarters: Montreal, Quebec

Programming
- Language: French
- Picture format: 1080i (HDTV); 480i (SDTV)

Ownership
- Owner: Astral Media (2008–2013); Corus Entertainment (2008–2015)
- Parent: Teletoon Canada, Inc.
- Sister channels: Teletoon Retro; Télétoon; Teletoon; Cartoon Network

History
- Launched: September 4, 2008; 18 years ago
- Closed: September 1, 2015; 11 years ago
- Replaced by: La Chaîne Disney

Télétoon Rétro was a Canadian French language Category B specialty television channel that was owned by Corus Entertainment. The channel was based on the Télétoon programming block of the same name and aired French-dubbed animated series that had premiered on television at least ten years prior to their airing on Télétoon Retro. In 2013, Télétoon Rétro, along with its English language sister station, Teletoon Retro, were available in over nine million Canadian households combined, having the most subscribers among the digital Canadian specialty channels.

== History ==
Télétoon Rétro initially started as a programming block on Télétoon. On November 24, 2000, Teletoon Canada Inc. (at the time, an equal joint venture between Corus Entertainment and Astral Media) was granted approval by the Canadian Radio-television and Telecommunications Commission (CRTC) to launch Teletoon Retro, described as "a national Category 2 specialty television service with English- and French-language feeds. The service shall present classic cartoons from Canada and around the world, including animated movies, specials, series and shorts which commenced production at least ten years prior to their exhibition by the licensee." The channel did not launch when the licence expired.

On October 21, 2005, Teletoon Canada Inc. was given another approval to launch Télétoon Rétro, this time as a singular French channel with no English language feed.

The Télétoon Rétro logo used from September 4, 2008 to February 4, 2013

Télétoon Rétro launched on September 4, 2008, and promoted with select programs airing on Télétoon on Saturday and Sunday nights at 7:00pm EST. An English-language counterpart, Teletoon Retro, had previously launched on October 1, 2007.

Along with Teletoon Retro, Télétoon Rétro rebranded on February 4, 2013. On March 4, 2013, Corus Entertainment announced that it would acquire Astral Media's 50% ownership interest in Teletoon Canada Inc. The purchase was in relation to Bell Media's acquisition of Astral, which had earlier been rejected by the CRTC in October 2012, but was restructured to allow the sale of certain Astral Media properties in order to allow the purchase to clear regulatory hurdles. Corus' purchase was cleared by the Competition Bureau two weeks later on March 18. On December 20, 2013, the CRTC approved Corus' full ownership of Teletoon Canada Inc. and it was acquired by Corus on January 1, 2014.

On March 24, 2014, Télétoon Rétro launched Télétoon Rétro HD, a high definition simulcast of the standard definition feed.

On April 16, 2015, Corus Entertainment announced that it had acquired long-term, Canadian multi-platform rights to Disney Channel's programming library; the cost and duration of the licensing deal were not disclosed. Alongside the licensing deal, Corus announced that it would launch a Canadian version of Disney Channel; the service consisted of linear television channels in English and French, along with TV Everywhere and video-on-demand services for digital platforms.

In August 2015, it was announced that Télétoon Rétro, along with its English-language counterpart, would close on September 1, with Télétoon Rétro rebranded as the French-language Disney Channel. On September 1, 2015, Télétoon Rétro closed and was replaced with La Chaîne Disney to coincide with the launch of its English-language counterpart, Disney Channel.
