= The Day My Butt Went Psycho! =

2013 animated TV series

- Genre: Comedy
- Based on: The Day My Bum Went Psycho by Andy Griffiths
- Developed by: Mark Steinberg
- Directed by: Matt Ferguson
- Voices of: Deven Mack; Robert Tinkler; Bryn McAuley; Kedar Brown; Julie Lemieux; Ted Dykstra; Mark Edwards; Joe Pingue
- Theme music composer: George Guerrette
- Composers: Stephen Skratt & Asher Lenz
- Countries of origin: Australia; Canada
- Original language: English
- No. of seasons: 2
- No. of episodes: 40 (79 segments)

Production
- Executive producers: Colin Bohm; Irene Weibel; Andrew Davies; Julia Adams; Jo Rooney; Andy Ryan; For Teletoon: Hugues Dufour; Alan Gregg (season 1)
- Producers: Andrew Davies; Vanessa Esteves (season 1)
- Production companies: Nelvana Limited; Studio Moshi (season 1)

Original release
- Network: Nine Network (Australia); Teletoon (Canada); Netflix (season 2)
- Release: September 21, 2013 – June 30, 2015

The Day My Butt Went Psycho! is an animated comedy television series based loosely upon the novel series of a similar name by Andy Griffiths. The show was produced by Nelvana and Studio Moshi, and premiered on the Australian television channel Nine Network in September 2013 and on Teletoon (now Cartoon Network) and on the Canadian version of Boomerang.

== Plot ==
An episode of The Day My Butt Went Psycho!, comprising the stories "Beat Box Butt" and "Legend of the Buttsquatch"

The series, played out as an episodic comedy as opposed to a story-based narrative as the novels were, features Zack Freeman, a junior butt fighter, his anthropomorphic butt Deuce and Eleanor Sterne, the daughter of legendary butt fighter Silas Sterne.

== Cast ==
- Deven Mack as Zackary "Zack" Henry Freeman
- Robert Tinkler as Deuce
- Bryn McAuley as Eleanor Sterne
- Kedar Brown as Silas Sterne
- Julie Lemieux as Gran
- Ted Dykstra as The Great White Butt
- Mark Edwards as The Prince
- Joe Pingue as Maurice

=== Additional cast ===
- Juan Chioran
- Linda Kash
- Paul Soles
- Zachary Bennett
- Christian Potenza
- Dan Chameroy
- Jamie Watson
- Seán Cullen
- Ron Pardo
- Rick Jones
- Dwayne Hill
- Sunday Muse
- Jayne Eastwood
- Lauren Collins as Paige the Cheerleader
- Ron Rubin
- Aron Tager
- David Berni
- Scott McCord
- Patrick McKenna

== Episodes ==
=== Series overview ===
Season	Episodes	Originally aired	
Season	Episodes	First aired	Last aired
1	20	June 12, 2014	October 16, 2014
2	20	June 30, 2015 (Netflix)	

=== Season 1 (2014) ===
This season was televised on Teletoon and Télétoon from June 12 to October 16, 2014.

No.	Title	Original release date
1	"Beat Box Butt" "Legend of the Buttsquatch"	June 12, 2014
"Beat Box Butt": Deuce becomes a viral star. "Legend of the Buttsquatch": Silas Sterne tells a story.
2	"Grandparents' Butts Just Don't Understand" "Comic Butt Convention"	June 19, 2014
"Grandparents' Butts Just Don't Understand": Gran is convinced to let her butt babysit Zack and Deuce. "Comic Butt Convention": Zack is given a comic book by a weird mystic, who claims he is the Chosen One. Later they find out that the weird mystic was their enemies, Prince and Maurice, that was sent by the Great White Butt.
3	"Glutiator" "Zackster of Disguise"	June 26, 2014
"Glutiator": Zack participates in a battle after being invited. "Zackster of Disguise": Zack attempts disguise.
4	"Buttstache" "Journey to the Center of the Mabletown Crack"	July 3, 2014
"Buttstache": Zack and Deuce grow mustaches. "Journey to the Center of Mabletown Crack": Deuce and Eleanor argue.
5	"The Flushinator" "Bubble Bum"	July 10, 2014
"The Flushinator": A robot toilet from the future arrives. "Bubble Bum": Zack gets allergic to Deuce.
6	"Harmony Day" "Wacky Wednesday"	July 24, 2014
"Harmony Day": It's Harmony Day, so it's celebrated. "Wacky Wednesday": Deuce and Zack switch bodies by accidentally dropping a glass sphere. Note: The aim of this episode is to teach the functions of Francis Hauksbee's static electricity generator. The sphere in the episode also has an eerie blue glow, just like when you touch the glass sphere in the generator.
7	"Bum Shelter" "My Milkshake Brings All the Butts to the Yard"	July 17, 2014
"Bum Shelter": A soldier hiding in a shelter is found by Zack and Deuce. "My Milkshake Brings All the Butts to the Yard": Silas Sterne makes a milkshake.
8	"The Dark Nugget" "Dodgebutt"	August 7, 2014
"The Dark Nugget": Zack and Eleanor's glory is stolen by something mysterious. "Dodgebutt": Deuce is taken to a "boga" (butt yoga) class by Zack and Eleanor.
9	"Jurassic Fart" "Basic In-Stink"	July 31, 2014
"Jurassic Fart": Zack and Deuce accidentally revive a dinosaur. "Basic In-Stink": The Mabletown Butt Menace Meter breaks.
10	"Royal Flush" "Game of Porcelain Thrones"	August 4, 2014
"Royal Flush": Zack gets an interesting email. "Game of Porcelain Thrones": Zack develops an interest in history.
11	"Flush of Dooty" "The Fast & the Gluteus"	August 14, 2014
"Flush of Dooty": Zack gets addicted to a video game. "The Fast & the Gluteus": A butt buggy is built by Zack and Deuce.
12	"How Deuce Got His Stink Back" "Big Butt House"	August 21, 2014
"How Deuce Got His Stink Back": Zack removes Deuce's stinky smell. "Big Butt House": Zack, Eleanor, the butts, and Silas compete in a reality show that's a trap.
13	"Gran to Gran Combat" "Snoozing Booty"	September 11, 2014
"Gran to Gran Combat": Zack has to run errands with Gran instead of being with Eleanor at Flushing Gardens. "Snoozing Booty": Zack and Deuce combine to win a contest, but Deuce ends up falling asleep.
14	"Plumber Butt" "Butt I'm a Cheerleader"	September 4, 2014
"Plumber Butt": Zack tries to scare Deuce with a story about the Plumber's Butt. "Butt I'm a Cheerleader": Zack and Deuce get on the wrong bus.
15	"Everybooty Loves the Great White Butt" "The Brownout"	September 18, 2014
"Everybooty Loves the Great White Butt": The followers of the Great White Butt abandon him. "The Brownout": The power of Mabletown is sucked out by Deuce.
16	"Switched at Butt" "The Dark Nugget Returns"	September 25, 2014
"Switched at Butt": Zack and Deuce appear on a talk show. "The Dark Nugget Returns": Bummy Rippa shoots a movie in Mabletown.
17	"C'est Cheek" "I, Robutt"	October 2, 2014
"C'est Cheek": Zack and fashion. "I, Robutt": Zack hurts his back after falling.
18	"Eternal Bumshine of the Spotless Behind" "Skull & Bums"	October 9, 2014
"Eternal Bumshine of the Spotless Behind": Deuce gets amnesia after bumping his head. "Skull & Bums": A secret club invites Zack and Deuce, and they join.
19	"I Dream of Deucie" "Planet of the Butt Monkeys"	October 16, 2014
"I Dream of Deucie": In the Sea of Butts, Zack, Deuce, and Eleanor find a bottle. "Planet of the Butt Monkeys": Deuce uses a forbidden instrument.
20	"The Prince of Pantsylvania" "Wedgie Tales"	October 23, 2014
"The Prince of Pantsylvania": The Prince of Pantsylvania, a spoiled little brat, has come to Mabeltown in search of his long lost butt. "Wedgie Tales": Deuce inadvertently becomes a circus star by constantly getting wedgied again and again.

=== Season 2 (2015) ===
No.	Title	Original release date
21	"Gary White Butt" "My Fair Derriere"	July 7, 2015
22	"All's Smell That Ends Smell" "Cheer Window"	June 30, 2015
23	"They Came from Uranus!" "Being Deuce"	July 14, 2015
24	"On Goldie Oldie Pond" "The D-Team"	July 21, 2015
25	"Outhouse on Haunted Hill" "99 Flavours, Buttfightin' Ain't One"	July 28, 2015
26	"Don't Shoot the Messagebutt" "Buttnado"	August 4, 2015
27	"The Old Butts and the Sea" "Pinch Me If You Can"	August 11, 2015
28	"Exit Through the Outhouse" "Bums of Steel"	August 18, 2015
29	"Backdrafters" "Calendar Butt"	August 25, 2015
30	"Eleanor Smellanor" "Breaking Bunbury"	September 1, 2015
31	"Last of the Plungercorns" "Smelling Bee"	September 8, 2015
32	"The Notorious B.U.T.T." "Prom Prom Night"	September 15, 2015
33	"Cheeky-O's" "To Flush or Not to Flush"	September 22, 2015
34	"The Stinkiness" "Crouching Tiger; Hidden Toot"	September 29, 2015
35	"Oh Butt Brain, Where Art Thou?" "Bad News Butt Fighter"	October 6, 2015
36	"The Dark Nugget Floats" "Butts v. Zack: Dawn of Injustice"	October 13, 2015
37	"Runnin' on Empty!" "Dodgebutt Rules"	October 20, 2015
38	"F2: Flushment Day" "The Great White Buff"	October 27, 2015
39	"Jani-Thor" "Silas Says"	November 3, 2015
40	"Bring Me the Butt of Silas Sterne"	November 10, 2015

== Broadcast ==
The series aired on Okto in Singapore, and TVNZ 2 in New Zealand. The series also debuted on Cartoon Network (now Boomerang) in Canada in 2017
