= Edward Kay (writer) =

Canadian showrunner, screenwriter, producer, novelist and journalist

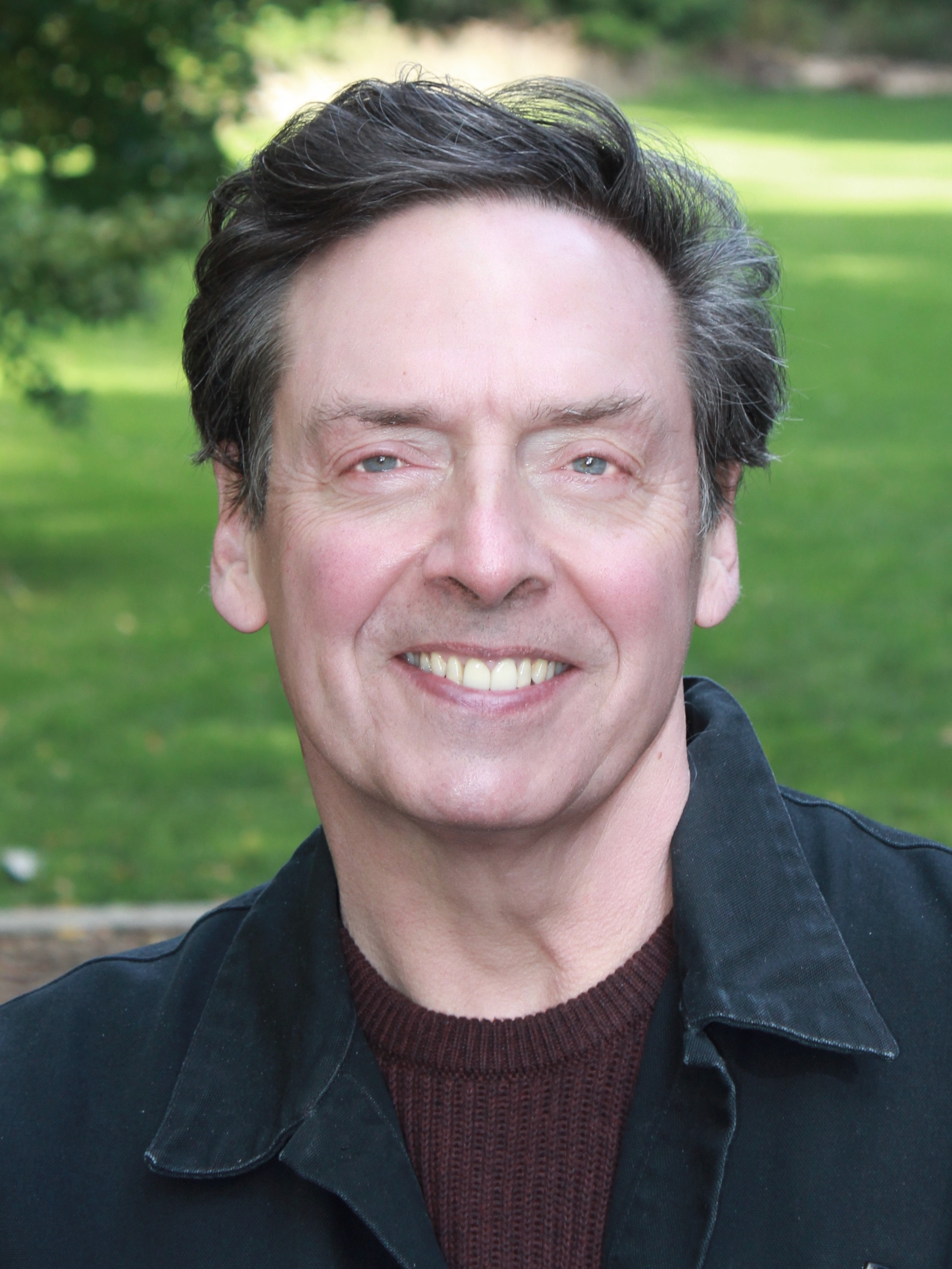
Edward Kay

Edward Kay is a Canadian showrunner, screenwriter, producer, novelist and journalist with a background in both live-action and animated television comedy, as well as print journalism.

Kay spent four years as a writer and producer on the political satire This Hour Has 22 Minutes before becoming supervising producer of The Itch, a comedy series starring Jason Jones and Jessica Holmes. Kay then co-created the animated children's series Ollie's Under-the-Bed Adventures (later known as Olliver's Adventures) and wrote the pilot episode, which won a Gemini Award for Best Animated Program. He wrote numerous episodes of Atomic Betty, an animated science fiction television series. With Sean Scott, he was the co-creator of Jimmy Two-Shoes, an animated comedy series that was put into production by Disney XD and Teletoon in December 2007. He is the co-creator of Finding Stuff Out, a comedy science show that airs on TVO and Knowledge Network.

Kay's first novel, a young adult science fiction comedy entitled STAR Academy, was released September 15, 2009 by Random House/Doubleday. The sequel, Dark Secrets, was released on September 13, 2011. He subsequently was commissioned by Scholastic Books to write a historical novel about the Battle of the Atlantic, entitled Sink and Destroy, which was released in 2014.

His thriller entitled At Rope's End was released by New York City-based publisher Crooked Lane in January 2017.

In 2019, Kay's first non-fiction title, Stinky Science, was released by Kids Can Press in Canada and by Hachette worldwide. A companion volume, Germy Science, was released in October 2021.

Kay's writing for This Hour Has 22 Minutes has garnered him three Gemini Awards, a Canadian Comedy Award, and a Canadian Screenwriting Award. For his work in print journalism, he has received two National Magazine Award Honourable Mentions.
