= A Treasure in My Garden =

A Treasure in My Garden (original French-language title: Un trésor dans mon jardin) is a Canadian series of songs and accompanying animated shorts created by Gilles Vigneault. The animated series was produced with the participation of Teletoon/Télétoon in both English and French, and was first shown in September 2003 on both channels.

== Episodes ==
An additional song, Un soir d'hiver, is present on the French-language audio CD but not the English-language one, and does not appear to have a corresponding animated short.

No. overall	No. in season	Title	Original air date (Télétoon)	Original air date (Teletoon)
1	1	"La marmite" "The Pot"	September 4, 2003	September 3, 2003
2	2	"Le petit bonhomme" "The Man from Leeds"	September 3, 2003	September 12, 2003
3	3	"Une chanson pomme" "Apple Song"	September 8, 2003	September 16, 2003
4	4	"Comptine pour endormir l'enfant qui ne veut rien savoir" "Sleepy Sheep Hoedown for the Kid who Won't Lie Down"	September 1, 2003	September 16, 2003
5	5	"Le réverbère" "The Lamppost"	September 4, 2003	September 16, 2003
6	6	"Les boîtes" "Boxes"	September 2, 2003	September 19, 2003
7	7	"J'ai pour toi un lac" "For You, I've a Lake"	September 1, 2003	September 20, 2003
8	8	"Capot l'ourson" "Teddy"	September 5, 2003	September 15, 2003
9	9	"Le trésor" "My Treasure"	September 5, 2003	September 12, 2003
10	10	"Barati, baratin" "Scuttlebut, What a Nut"	September 22, 2003	September 17, 2003
11	11	"Les amours les travaux" "Love and Work"	September 2, 2003	September 10, 2003
12	12	"Sur le bout de la langue" "On the Tip of My Tongue"	September 22, 2003	September 10, 2003
13	13	"Berceuse pour Julie" "Julie's Lullaby"	September 5, 2003	September 10, 2003
