= Collideascope =

Former Canadian animation studio

- Industry: Animation; New media
- Founded: 1995; 31 years ago
- Founders: Michael-Andreas Kuttner; Steven Comeau
- Defunct: 2009; 17 years ago
- Fate: Closed
- Headquarters: Halifax, Nova Scotia, Canada
- Products: Olliver's Adventures; Delilah & Julius
- Number of employees: 120 (2007)

Collideascope, or Collideascope Digital Productions, was a Canadian animation studio and new media company based in Halifax, Nova Scotia from 1995 to 2009. Founded by Michael-Andreas Kuttner and Steven Comeau, it was the largest animation studio in Atlantic Canada at 120 employees in 2007, down from 130 at its peak in 2005.

Notable original productions from Collideascope include the Gemini Award-winning Olliver's Adventures, one of the earliest animated television series made in Macromedia Flash, and Delilah & Julius, both in association with Decode Entertainment and commissioning broadcaster Teletoon.

The company also handled animation service work, including for Johnny Test and its final project before shutting down, Speed Racer: The Next Generation.
