= Delilah & Julius =

Canadian animated television series

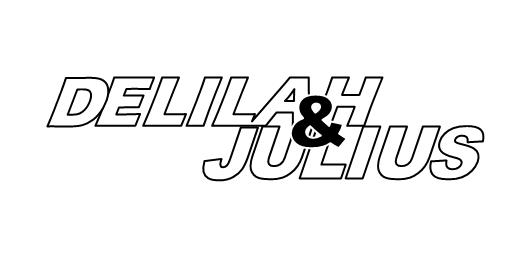
- Genre: Animated series
- Created by: Suzanne Chapman; Steven JP Comeau
- Developed by: Lienne Sawatsky; Daniel Williams
- Directed by: Nick Rijgersberg (season 2)
- Voices of: Marieve Herington; Fabrizio Filippo
- Composer: Pure West
- Country of origin: Canada
- Original language: English
- No. of seasons: 2
- No. of episodes: 52

Production
- Executive producers: Suzanne Chapman (season 1); Steven JP Comeau; Steven DeNure (season 2); Neil Court (season 2)
- Producers: Michael-Andreas Kuttner; Beth Stevenson
- Running time: 22 minutes
- Production companies: Decode Entertainment; Collideascope Digital Productions

Original release
- Network: Teletoon
- Release: August 14, 2005 – August 16, 2008

Delilah & Julius is a Canadian animated series targeted at children as well as teenagers and adults, and animated using Macromedia Flash technology. It premiered on the Canadian animation channel Teletoon. Delilah & Julius was produced by Decode Entertainment and Collideascope Digital Productions. 52 episodes were produced.

The series centers on a pair of highly trained young adults, Delilah and Julius, who were both orphaned children of special agents. Together, they graduated from the Academy, a training facility headed by Al, a free-spirited special agent who brought the duo together, and fight international crime and a myriad of villains as a pair of savvy, well-trained spies.

== Characters ==
=== Main characters ===
Delilah and Julius are depicted as multi talented, being gifted musicians, masters of disguise, martial arts experts, and fluent in 20 languages. The pair is shown as professional and work together well as a team, though at times their relationship can be seen as romantic.

==== Delilah Devinshire ====
Delilah Devinshire (Marieve Herington) has a very determined personality. Delilah's greatest quality is her commitment to truth. It's also what gets her into trouble. She takes things seriously, but she can break down easily in certain situations. Her spy parents went missing when she was only five and are presumed dead. Delilah does not believe this, however, and she is determined to know more about them and to disprove the rumors that her parents were double agents. Delilah's relationship with Julius is very important to her and gets jealous when Julius flirts with other girls (especially Ice). She appreciates having a capable partner in Julius, and together they will stop at nothing to keep the villains from carrying out their evil plots. Delilah believes in breaking her opponent down from the inside out. She gets inside the villain's head, and she loves a new challenge. Delilah is strong-willed, inventive, resourceful, quick-thinking, and graceful. She is experienced in fencing, etiquette, and explosives, and always has time to learn something new that may be useful on a mission.

==== Julius Chevalier ====
Julius Chevalier (Fabrizio Filippo) is often flippant, but is very determined and has a passion for crime-fighting. Where Delilah is more goal-oriented, Julius is more spontaneous. He deals with situations as they happen and still manages to find the time to have fun. He enjoys surfing, poetry, safe cracking and yoga. His parents were killed in action when he was only four, and Julius wishes avenge their deaths. For now, he is comforted by the fact that they were considered two of the greatest spies of all time. Julius is laid-back and a little cocky. This confidence allows him to act on the fly and keep cool in the face of danger, though he tends to be a bit careless in calmer situations. He has a good sense of humor and is very intuitive when it comes to the needs of his partner, Delilah. Beneath a nonchalant, arrogant exterior lies a sensitive and caring guy – especially towards Delilah. He often tries to impress Delilah, and becomes extremely jealous and petty when she shows interest in other boys. He is shown to be in love with Delilah.

=== The Academy Crew ===
==== Alfred "Al" ====
The director of the Academy, Al (Andy Bianchi) is always highly informed and gives Delilah and Julius their mission assignments. Al is not only their primary contact and mentor, but he is also a parental figure for Delilah and Julius. A free-spirited individual, Al's method of speech is modeled after the mid-'70s Californian hippie stereotype. He is passionate about food and culture and has a unique sense of humour, but can also be serious, especially when it comes to keeping his students safe.

==== Scarlett Vance ====
Scarlett (Jackie Rosenbaum) is the Academy's gadget guru. Like Al, Scarlett is prone to using anachronistic '70s expressions as well as caring a lot about her students. She is inventive and always coming up with new spy technology that keeps Delilah and Julius ahead on their missions.

==== Buster "Nosey" ====
A frequent partner of Delilah and Julius, Nosey (Robert Tinkler) is a well-meaning, good-hearted goof with a reputation for being a stink magnet. It's not that he is really stinky, he is just inevitably drawn into very smelly situations on his missions. Nosey seems to be attracted to Zoe, a new member of the Academy.

==== Ursula and Emmet ====
Another one of Al's arranged spy teams, Ursula and Emmet are the rivals of Delilah and Julius who are jealous of their popularity and success. Ursula is also a double agent working undercover at the Academy for an unknown evil foe. Emmet starts hanging out with Nosey after this reveal.

==== Zoe Ling ====
Zoe (Athena Karkanis) is the newest Chinese spy at the Academy. She likes to read comics and knows them all by enthusiasm. When Zoe first arrives at the Academy, she thinks Julius is cute. However, a relationship with Nosey is revealed throughout a few episodes. Zoe is a redhead and has a rather feisty personality which is the stereotypical attitude most redheads have. Her espionage skills are well-developed, and the Academy Crew seems to trust this newcomer.

=== Villains ===
- Dr. Eric Dismay: Dr. Dismay is a young, handsome doctor bent on world domination who tries hard to break the stereotypical mold of a mad scientist. With his evil sidekick "Nurse" he tries to stop Delilah and Julius using his bad medication.
- Professor Bob Dismay: An evil genius and father of Dr. Dismay.
- Dexter Jeremy Hook "DJ Hook": An internationally-known DJ tries to dominate the world. A big advantage for him is that he can hypnotize people with his music. Delilah and Julius can usually maneuver around it and stop the evil DJ.
- Ms. Wendy Deeds: The leader of a crime syndicate specializing in cybercrime.
- Ice: A master manipulator of earth science who also has her eyes on Julius.
- Wednesday Kertsfield: A young socialite who uses her money to try to take over the world.
- Conman: A master of disguise, he is behind some of the biggest scams ever committed against humanity. Nobody has ever seen his real face, not even any of his many kidnapping victims. Delilah and Julius uncovered his face, but instead of having a face the conman wore a permanent mask.
- Baguio Joe: A volatile weatherman who really controls the weather.
- Gilly Hippodrome: A mutant who hates normal-looking people. He is also the leader of a group of freaks masquerading as a circus, where he is the "Clown Prince".
- Dr. Jody Thorax : A female scientist create mutant bugs.
- Ursula: Although a member of the academy, she is working as a double agent.
- Tibor: He is after the zero list and is also Julius' brother.
- Sunshine: Ice's twin sister and a villain with a fiery attitude.
- Dollface and Roy: A woman who is part-robot, part-human, and wants to take over the world with her "husband", full-time robot, Roy. She wants the entire world to be of robots, and no humans at all.
- Evil Eye and Francis: Evil Eye lost his eye while trying to escape from the police, and he believes that he lost it because of Delilah. Francis is his cowardly sidekick.

== Cast ==
Currently available sources do not fully identify which actors voiced most supporting characters; however, actors known to have had roles in the series include Denis Akiyama, Linda Ballantyne, Scott Beaudin, Robert Bockstael, Justin Bradley, Benedict Campbell, Drew Coombs, Neil Crone, Stacey DePass, Carlos Diaz, Novie Edwards, James Gallanders, Janet-Laine Green, Katie Griffin, Jamie Gutfreund, Tim Hamaguchi, Tracey Hoyt, Randy Hughson, C. David Johnson, Brittany Kay, Kim Kuhteubl, Julie Lemieux, Scott McCord, Marnie McPhail, Stephanie Anne Mills, Al Mukadam, Noah Plener, Jeff Pustil, Adam Reid, Andrew Sabiston, Tyrone Savage, Alison Sealy-Smith, Colette Stevenson, Susan Quinn, Rachel Wilson, Danny Wells, Maurice Dean Wint and Noam Zylberman.

== Episodes ==
Two seasons were produced, each consisting of 26 episodes. Each season included a three-part finale, originally aired together under one title but later as separate episodes.

"The Underground" is the pilot episode for the series.

=== Series overview ===
Season	Episodes	Originally released	
Season	Episodes	First released	Last released
1	26	August 14, 2005	June 17, 2006
2	26	August 31, 2007	August 16, 2008

=== Season 1 (2005–06) ===
No. overall	No. in season	Title	Written by	Original release date	Prod. code
1	1	"The Underground"	Lienne Sawatsky and Daniel Williams	October 8, 2005	101
A missing train full of foreign athletes lead Delilah and Julius to Ms. Deeds and her plot to annihilate the planet and start an underground civilization.
2	2	"Fun for All"	Lienne Sawatsky and Daniel Williams	September 25, 2005	102
Dr. Dismay is about to unleash a deadly virus on unsuspecting fun-seekers at an amusement park, thanks to the help of Carlial, A genetic scientist for hire.
3	3	"Ice, Ice, Baby"	Nicole Demerse	September 17, 2005	103
The entire planet is plunged into the Dark Ages when the flirtatiously sexy, yet sinister Ice steals the world's power.
4	4	"Delilah Identity"	Simon Racioppa and Richard Elliott	August 14, 2005	104
Delilah is suspected of being a mole in the Academy, and must go undercover to prove her innocence.
5	5	"Mayans Ruined"	Anita Kapila	September 11, 2005	105
D&J head to Mexico to investigate a missing archeologist, and to solve the mystery of an ancient artifact with healing powers.
6	6	"All You Need Is Love"	Bruce Robb	September 10, 2005	106
Delilah becomes embroiled in a revenge plot involving her parents, a wrongly imprisoned agent, and a secret Navajo code.
7	7	"Project Greenthumb"	Sean Jara	September 4, 2005	107
D&J head to the fashionable city of London to track down a top agent who has gone missing.
8	8	"The Ratings War"	Kenn Scott	September 3, 2005	108
Planet Earth News Network is taking over the airwaves, suspiciously scooping news stories before anyone else.
9	9	"Eye of the Storm"	Sean Jara	September 24, 2005	109
To promote a sense of "oneness" (Al's lexis), Delilah and Julius, Ursula and Emmet are notified that they are to switch partners, for good.
10	10	"Saving Scarlett"	Deborah Jarvis	October 1, 2005	110
Scarlett has been kidnapped and there's a bomb at the Academy and D&J discover that Wednesday is behind the sinister plot.
11	11	"Simple Minds"	Michael Best	October 2, 2005	111
D&J find themselves on a malfunctioning plane about to crash on the remote "Happy Times Island".
12	12	"Hunk Island"	Nicole Demerse	October 9, 2005	112
D&J are sent to stop Wednesday Kertsfield, who has been kidnapping young, beautiful male actors and models in order for them to compete, gladiator style, for her affection.
13	13	"Batman of Borneo"	Bruce Robb	October 15, 2005	113
D&J and Nosey are sent to Borneo to find an antidote for a deadly virus unleashed through pre-programmed bugs.
14	14	"To Spy or Not to Spy"	Simon Racioppa and Richard Elliott	October 16, 2005	114
It's Academy vacation, and much to Delilah's disappointment, they are spending it at a ski resort. But after several big foot sightings, Delilah finds that she is not so bored after all.
15	15	"The Last Day of Christmas"	Lienne Sawatsky and Daniel Williams	December 18, 2005	115
It's Christmas, but instead of peace on earth, the Academy and their yacht are being held hostage by a mysterious new villain, and only D&J can pull a Christmas miracle.
16	16	"A Very Important Date"	Anita Kapila	November 13, 2005	116
D&J go undercover at a dating service to find out who has been kidnapping the young rich and beautiful people in New York City. And also to find out that they are each other's perfect match in the process.
17	17	"The Ringmaster"	Sean Jara	December 17, 2005	117
D&J are assigned to guard the precocious daughter of a workaholic and genius geneticist.
18	18	"A Dreamer Never Dies"	Lienne Sawatsky and Daniel Williams	January 4, 2006	118
Julius investigates a high number of comas in a hospital, and discovers that Dr. Dismay is stealing people's dreams while about to get his dreams taking away, he starts to dream himself, about Delilah.
19	19	"A New Ice Age"	Nicole Demerse	January 11, 2006	119
Ice is back with a vengeance, this time with a formula that slowly freezes the Earth's oceans causing a new ice age.
20	20	"Paris to Dakar"	Bruce Robb	January 18, 2006	120
D&J are undercover drivers in the world longest car race to track down the smugglers of uranium.
21	21	"Game, Set, Match"	Deborah Jarvis	March 15, 2006	121
D&J go undercover as pro tennis players to protect an international tennis star.
22	22	"The Hunter"	Nicole Demerse	March 16, 2006	122
Temples across China are being robbed, and intel suggests an ex-GIB top spy is behind the robberies.
23	23	"Terror by Tarot"	Bruce Robb	March 17, 2006	123
D&J go undercover in New Orleans as World Historical Society agents to guard a three-hundred-year-old voodoo death mask.
24	24	"The Truth Be Gold – Part 1 – All That Glitters Is Gold"	Lienne Sawatsky and Daniel Williams	June 17, 2006 (July 5, 2006)	124
D&J go to the ORB lab in the Yukon to destroy the ORB super computer ran by Klaus.
25	25	"The Truth Be Gold – Part 2 – See How They Run"	Sean Jara	June 17, 2006 (July 6, 2006)	125
D&J go to deliver Klaus but the ORB corporation attacked the plane they were on and they now have to survive in the wild.
26	26	"The Truth Be Gold – Part 3 – Heir Apparent"	Anita Kapila	June 17, 2006 (July 7, 2006)	126
D&J head to ORB headquarters to discover the truth about Delilah's parents.

=== Season 2 (2007–08) ===
No. overall	No. in season	Title	Written by	Original release date	Prod. code
27	1	"The Fear Inside"	Lienne Sawatsky & Daniel Williams	August 31, 2007	201
A nearby spy school is disbanded by crippling fear gas and Delilah and Julius race to save the academy from the same fate.
28	2	"Land of the Setting Sun"	Anita Kapila	September 16, 2007	202
Delilah and Julius are sent to turn the light back on when someone drains Tokyo's electricity.
29	3	"Homework Detrimental"	Doug Hadders and Adam Rotstein	September 23, 2007	203
Going undercover at a girls' school is difficult for Delilah, who's comfortable hunting super villains, but out of her element with regular teenagers.
30	4	"Al Riled Up"	Daniel Williams and Lienne Sawatsky	September 30, 2007	204
Al is accused of treason and has to fight for his life when Dynimo, a blast from his past, takes him hostage.
31	5	"The Comic Capers"	Deborah Jarvis	October 7, 2007	205
Delilah, Julius and Zoe are at a convention when a mysterious villain commits elaborate plans modeled from comic book scenes.
32	6	"Hollywood Plot"	Sean Kalb	October 9, 2007	206
Delilah and Julius head for tinsel town when they refuse to believe Dexter J. Hook has become a legitimate movie producer.
33	7	"Blinded by Love"	Bruce Rob	October 21, 2007	207
Delilah walks into a deadly trap laid by an eye-patch wearing villain who blames Delilah for his missing eye.
34	8	"A Dirty Job"	Daniel Williams and Lienne Sawatsky	November 4, 2007	208
A garbage barge, a yellow briefcase, and the Zero List all converge at Pier 14 to help D&J bring down an international smuggling ring.
35	9	"Love Bytes"	Anita Kapila	November 11, 2007	209
Delilah and Julius have to stop Dollface, a half-human, half-android, from creating a robot army to enslave the human race.
36	10	"Pressure Drop"	Doug Hadders and Adam Rotstein	November 12, 2007	210
Delilah and Zoe have to save Julius, Nosey, and Emmet from Ms. Deeds when they travel as backpackers to a monastery in Tibet to find out about the Zero List.
37	11	"Frozen in Time"	Daniel Williams and Lienne Sawatsky	November 25, 2007	211
The Academy comes to the rescue when Delilah and Julius get frozen solid investigating a cryogenics lab.
38	12	"All Along the Clock Tower"	Betty Quan	December 2, 2007	212
Rescuing Agent Robinson from the maniacal Timekeeper offers Delilah & Julius a glimpse into the possibility of time travel - and Delilah revisits a memento from her past.
39	13	"The Zero Hour"	Dave Diaz	December 9, 2007	213
There's a showdown at high noon when Delilah and Julius travel to a ghost town and discover just how many villains are after the Zero List.
40	14	"Family Pass"	Dave Diaz	February 21, 2008	214
Under investigation for treason, Julius flees the Academy only to be thrust into the middle of warring super agents who risk the lives of innocent amusement park goers.
41	15	"Bugged"	Bruce Robb	February 21, 2008	215
An insect infestation, that hinders the Academy, from Dr. Thorax threatens Julius with a buggy genetic mutation.
42	16	"Dawn of a New Day"	Anita Kapila	April 28, 2008	216
Dollface and Roy, the robotic-romantic duo, reunite with a plan to take over the world with a solar-powered army, and Delilah and Julius have only until sunrise to stop them.
43	17	"Just the Two of Us"	Dave Dias	April 29, 2008	217
Copycats make Delilah and Julius realize that fans can be a lot more than flattering - they can be deadly.
44	18	"Breakout"	Daniel Williams and Lienne Sawatsky	May 20, 2008	218
When Dynimo escapes the GIB with Ursula, Delilah and Julius trail the vengeful duo to a mysterious hidden facility.
45	19	"Every Breath You Take"	Shawn Kalb	May 20, 2008	219
Deep sea diving for deadly poisons brings Delilah and Julius face-to-face with an even deadlier underwater foe, a scuba-geared Dexter J. Hook.
46	20	"The Traitor Within"	Deborah Jarvis	June 20, 2008	220
Delilah and Julius have to unmask a villain when a deadly microbot is stolen from Scarlett's international spy gadget symposium.
47	21	"The Fugitive Vacationer"	Bruce Robb	June 23, 2008	221
Delilah and Julius get very little rest when assassins target an innocent bystander during the Academy vacation.
48	22	"Extreme Measures"	Anita Kapila	June 24, 2008	222
When Tibor kidnaps a world class Indian programmer, the Academy agents have to race across the rooftops of India to get him back before he is forced to repair the damaged Zero List.
49	23	"To Dismay's Dismay"	Daniel Williams and Lienne Sawatsky	June 25, 2008	223
An unlikely guest at the Academy sets D&J on the trail of a sleep depriving mad scientist.
50	24	"The End of Tomorrow – Part 1 – Present Tense"	Daniel Williams and Lienne Sawatsky	August 16, 2008 (October 28, 2011)	224
Delilah and Julius have to stop Tibor when he gets everything he needs to make time travel work.
51	25	"The End of Tomorrow – Part 2 – Simple Past"	Daniel Williams and Lienne Sawatsky	August 16, 2008 (October 31, 2011)	225
It's a race to rescue Al when Delilah and Julius learn that he holds the key to the Zero list.
52	26	"The End of Tomorrow – Part 3 – Future Perfect"	Daniel Williams and Lienne Sawatsky	August 16, 2008 (November 1, 2011)	226
Delilah and Julius travel to the past to stop Tibor when his poorly functioning time machine threatens to tear apart the fabric of space and time.

== Production ==
Development of the series began in early 2002, with 13 episodes budgeted at US$200,000–300,000 each. Originally, the show was aimed at the teenage girl demographic with a very different concept for the main characters, "a brawn-and-brains husband-and-wife team of self-made millionaires".

By 2005, the first season had expanded to 26 episodes in production, with a budget of $1.2 million. At the time, the premise of the series involved the title characters "fighting crimes of conformity" around the world.

== Home video releases ==
Delilah and Julius - The Complete First Season was released September 9, 2008. The DVD set contains the first 13 episodes in both English and French and has a run time of 290 minutes. Special features include character biographies, a spy gadget gallery, and the original English-language script for the pilot episode "The Underground".

An official YouTube channel run by WildBrain Spark began uploading episodes on May 31, 2019.

The full series has been released on CraveTV.

== Reception ==
The series was one of the top-rated shows on the English-language Teletoon in May 2006, and the 10th most popular original production on the French-language Télétoon as of October 2007.

The pilot episode was reviewed by the Edmonton Journal and The Sydney Morning Herald. Kidscreen compared the show to Totally Spies!, another Teletoon original, but with "a more sophisticated sense of humor focused on relationship-building" aiming for an older audience.

=== Awards and nominations ===
Year	Association	Category	Nominee	Result	Ref.
2007	Canadian New Media Awards	Excellence in Gaming	Delilah & Julius: Global Assignment	Nominated	
