= Jimmy Two-Shoes =

Canadian animated TV series

- Genre: Slapstick; Comedy; Animated sitcom; Surreal humor; Urban fantasy; Black comedy
- Created by: Edward Kay; Sean Scott
- Developed by: Alex Galatis; Kevin Gillis; Mark Evastaff (S2)
- Directed by: Sean Scott; Kyle Marshall (S2)
- Voices of: Cory Doran; Brian Froud; Tabitha St. Germain; Seán Cullen; Dwayne Hill
- Opening theme: "Jimmy Gets Around" (S1) "Jimmy's Gonna Be Your Best Friend" (S2)
- Composers: Jack Lenz (S1); Kevin Gillis (S1); Asher Lenz (S2); Stephen Skratt (S2); Lenz Entertainment (S2)
- Country of origin: Canada
- No. of seasons: 2
- No. of episodes: 52 (104 segments)

Production
- Executive producers: Joan Lambur (S2); Ira Levy; Peter Williamson; Kevin Gillis (S1); Marc Buhaj (S1); Daniel Wineman (S1); Edward Kay; Sean Scott
- Producers: Kevin Gillis (S1); Mark Evastaff
- Editors: Kevin Kocvar (S1); John McKinnon
- Running time: 22 minutes
- Production companies: Breakthrough Entertainment; Jetix Europe (S1)

Original release
- Network: Teletoon (Canada); Disney XD (International)
- Release: March 21, 2009 (Note: In the United States, its sneak peek arrived on February 13, 2009, but officially premiered on February 21, 2009.) – April 5, 2012 (Note: In the United States, it ended on July 15, 2011.)

Jimmy Two-Shoes (also known as JTS or as Jimmy Cool in most parts of Europe, Asia, and Israel) is a Canadian animated children's television series created by Edward Kay and Sean Scott. It was produced by Breakthrough Entertainment and for the first season, it was solely animated by Mercury Filmworks, but for the second and final season, Elliott Animation would collab with Mercury Filmworks to animate the series. It aired on Disney XD in the United States and Teletoon in Canada and Nickelodeon in South América. The series centers on the exploits of the happy-go-lucky title character, who lives in Miseryville, a miserable town filled with monsters and demon-like creatures.

The series originally premiered in the United States on February 13, 2009, and in Canada on March 21, 2009. The final episode aired on July 15, 2011 in the United States, and April 5, 2012 in Canada.

== Premise ==
The series follows the adventures of Jimmy, a happy-go-lucky boy who makes it his mission to find fun everywhere he goes. This is a challenge because Jimmy lives in Miseryville, the unhappiest town around, run by the megalomaniacal Lucius Heinous the Seventh. Miseryville has one main industry: Misery Inc., purveyors of putrid products guaranteed to cause grief; and they do not come with a money-back guarantee. Along with his best friends Heloise (part-time genius, full-time soul-crusher who is secretly in love with Jimmy) and Beezy (adventure lover, couch potato, and Jimmy's definitive best friend, who is also Lucius' son), Jimmy is determined to surf past all obstacles and bring his infectious enthusiasm to the whole town.

== Characters ==
=== Main characters ===
- Jimmy Two-Shoes (voiced by Cory Doran): The protagonist of the series, Jimmy is a 14-year-old boy known for his boundless optimism and thrill-seeking nature. He is determined to spread happiness in Miseryville, often clashing with its ruler, Lucius Heinous VII.
- Beezy J. Heinous (voiced by Brian Froud): Jimmy's best friend and the son of Lucius Heinous VII. Beezy is characterized by his laziness and self-centeredness but remains loyal to Jimmy.
- Heloise (voiced by Tabitha St. Germain): Another close friend of Jimmy, Heloise is a brilliant inventor with a sadistic side. She harbors a secret crush on Jimmy and often expresses her feelings through her actions.

=== Supporting characters ===
- Lucius Heinous VII (voiced by Seán Cullen): The ruler of Miseryville, Lucius is often at odds with Jimmy due to his attempts to bring joy to the town. Lucius is bitter and prefers to keep Miseryville as it is.

== Locations ==
- Miseryville - The town under the control of Lucius Heinous VII; its purpose is to sustain the lowest quality of life possible. The planet Miseryville is on is shaped like the Miseryville logo, and has a red sky and three suns. Its inhabitants mostly consist of monsters and other demon-like creatures, except for Jimmy and Heloise, who appear to be the only humans to inhabit it. Lucius' factory overshadows the town, and beyond that, it is surrounded by all sorts tall mountains, grassy meadows, forests, and volcanoes. There are strong implications throughout the series that Miseryville is (or is located in) Hell.
- Misery Inc. - A huge factory run by Lucius that produces various products intended to make people miserable. Anyone working for his company gets no vacations besides a one-week vacation that applies to everyone in Miseryville, sick days, bathroom breaks, pay, or general benefits from the occupation, and the longest they can get to rest is five seconds.
- Clownburg - A section of Miseryville where the Rodeo Clowns live.
- The Abyss of Nothingness - Seen in a few episodes, it is said to be a vast black hole filled with misery and despair from which no one can escape.
- Miseryville Beach - A beach beside an ocean of lava. It is inhabited by sea monsters and lava worms that eat the citizens.
- The Chocolate Lake - A lake of chocolate hidden under Misery Inc.
- Miseryville Golf Course - A mini-golf course that was built on a volcano.
- Misery Island - A popular vacation spot that is only visited during Spring Break. It has two sides; one pleasant and nice, the other evil and deadly.

== Production ==
According to Edward Kay, a 6-minute not-for-air demo was funded by one of the investors with the intention that the series would be a black comedy for an older youth audience. The original concept for Jimmy Two-Shoes has the location taking place in Hell, where Jimmy is accidentally sent after his untimely death. Several characters from this initial pitch have similar appearances yet different, darker attributes from their finalized television counterparts. The concept was later re-worked and revamped, with many of the mature elements removed, as it was considered too "edgy" for a 6-11 market. Previously lost, the pilot was found on May 4, 2025, and can be viewed on Edward Kay's YouTube channel.

== Episodes ==
Season	Episodes	Originally released	
Season	Episodes	First released	Last released
Pilot		2006	
1	26	February 13, 2009	November 14, 2009
2	26	October 30, 2010	July 15, 2011

=== Pilot (2006) ===
Title	Written by	Original release date	Prod. code
"Jimmy Two-Shoes"	Edward Kay	2006	001
Frustrated by his inability to blacken the heart of Hell's newest denizen, Jimmy Two-Shoes, Lucifer hires Hell's evilest inhabitant to torment Jimmy and break his spirit. That turns out to be a little girl named Heloise, who quickly takes Jimmy on what is more or less a date (all while trying to kill him through the whole thing).

=== Season 1 (2009) ===
No. overall	No. in season	Title	Written by	Storyboard by	Original release date	Prod. code
1	1	"I Totally Shredded My Cheese"	Max & Adam Reid	Helder Mendonca	February 13, 2009	106
1	1	"Heloise's Wish List"	Jenn Engels	Steve Whitehouse	February 22, 2009	106
"I Totally Shredded My Cheese": Jimmy creates a popular catchphrase: "I totally shredded my cheese!" However, he gets bored later on after his phrase becomes popular in Miseryville. "Heloise's Wish List": When Lucius fires Heloise, Jimmy cheers her up by making her a wish list.
2	2	"Pop-Sicles"	Mark Steinberg	Phil Lafrance	February 21, 2009	107
2	2	"Chez Beezy"	Deb Jarvis	Jordan Voth	February 21, 2009	107
"Pop-Sicles": Jimmy unfreezes Lucius' ancestors. "Chez Beezy": Beezy opens up his own restaurant.
3	3	"SpewTube"	Story by : John May; Teleplay by : Alex Galatis	Jamie LeClaire	February 28, 2009	101
3	3	"Monster Mutt"	Story by : John May; Teleplay by : Alex Galatis	Phil Lafrance	February 28, 2009	101
"SpewTube": After Heloise posts an embarrassing video of Lucius, Jimmy helps him regain his reputation. "Monster Mutt": Heloise switches Beezy's and Cerbee's bodies for ruining her picnic (date) with Jimmy.
4	4	"A Cold Day in Miseryville"	Kenn Scott	Simon Paquette	March 7, 2009	108
4	4	"Mount Misery"	Deb Jarvis	Nick Cross	March 7, 2009	108
"A Cold Day in Miseryville": Heloise creates a machine that makes snow in Miseryville. "Mount Misery": Jimmy helps the Weavils in protecting Mount Misery from Lucius.
5	5	"Heat Blanket Jimmy"	Story by : Robert Pincombe & Shelley Hoffman; Teleplay by : Mark Steinberg	Mike Smukavick	March 14, 2009	102
5	5	"Cellphone-itis"	Jenn Engels	Helder Mendonca	March 14, 2009	102
"Heat Blanket Jimmy": To beat the heat, Jimmy throws a beach party. "Cellphone-itis": Jimmy tries to help Beezy with his cellphone addiction.
6	6	"Power Squid and Spaghetti Beezy"	Mark Steinberg	Paul Watling	March 21, 2009	109
6	6	"The Big Date"	Edward Kay	Phil Lafrance & Rex Hackelberg	March 21, 2009	109
"Power Squid and Spaghetti Beezy": Jimmy and Beezy become superheroes. "The Big Date": Lucius hires Jimmy and Beezy to help him prepare for a big date with Jez, but when Heloise sees Jimmy and Jez together, she gets jealous.
7	7	"Carnival Lucius"	John Slama	Phil Lafrance	March 28, 2009	103
7	7	"Baby Boom"	Deb Jarvis	Steve Whitehouse	March 28, 2009	103
"Carnival Lucius": Lucius creates his own carnival that is "miserable". Meanwhile, Jimmy tries to win a carnival prize. "Baby Boom": Jimmy and Beezy babysit Molotov's son Tori and daughter Blammo to earn money for concert tickets.
8	8	"Way Below Par"	Hugh Duffy	Jordan Voth	April 4, 2009	104
8	8	"Jimmy Matchmaker"	Christin Simms	Nick Cross	April 4, 2009	104
"Way Below Par": Jimmy and Lucius play golf. "Jimmy Matchmaker": Jimmy helps Beezy find a date for Lucius' party.
9	9	"The Competition"	John Slama	Helder Mendonca	April 11, 2009	110
9	9	"Jimmy, Don't Be a Hero"	Alan Resnick	Jamie LeClaire	April 11, 2009	110
"The Competition": To get Heloise and Beezy to stop fighting, Jimmy organizes a contest where whichever of the two is nicest will get the last ticket to a popular concert. "Jimmy, Don't Be a Hero": Jimmy saves Lucius' life and Lucius owes him one, so now Lucius must find some way to relieve himself of the debt.
10	10	"A Hair-Brained Idea"	Craig Martin	Blayne Burnside & Ted Collyer	April 18, 2009	111
10	10	"Ghost Smackers"	Mark Steinberg	Phil Lafrance	April 18, 2009	111
"A Hair-Brained Idea": To look more handsome to Jez, Lucius switches his horns for Jimmy's hair, but both learn to their horror that the other's personality comes with it. "Ghost Smackers": Beezy has a ghost in his house, and Jimmy attempts to help it leave.
11	11	"Jimmy Gets a 'Stache'"	Alan Resnick	Helder Mendonca	May 30, 2009	112
11	11	"The Butley Did It"	Scott Albert	Phil Lafrance	May 30, 2009	112
"Jimmy Gets a 'Stache'": Everybody has a mustache except Jimmy which makes him jealous. "The Butley Did It": Lucius hires a butler for Beezy because he won't clean his room, which in turn makes him inordinately lazy.
12	12	"The Product Tester"	Alan Resnick	Steve Whitehouse	June 6, 2009	113
12	12	"Invasion of the Weavils"	Jenn Engels	Jordan Voth	June 6, 2009	113
"The Product Tester": Jimmy and Beezy work as Misery Inc. product testers. "Invasion of the Weavils": Jimmy believes he injured a Weavil, so he takes him in.
13	13	"Catalogue of Misery"	Todd Brian	Nick Cross	June 13, 2009	114
13	13	"Bend It Like Wreckem"	Scott Oh	Mike Smukavic	June 13, 2009	114
"Catalogue of Misery": Jimmy works for Misery Inc. to pay back Lucius for the merchandise he ordered, so he won't get Heloise fired. "Bend It Like Wreckem": Jimmy and Beezy accidentally injure a professional soccer player.
14	14	"Wish You Weren't Here"	Deb Jarvis	Jamie LeClaire	June 20, 2009	115
14	14	"Cerbee in Love"	Alan Resnick	Steve Whitehouse	June 20, 2009	115
"Wish You Weren't Here": Jimmy convinces Lucius to take a vacation. "Cerbee in Love": Cerbee falls in love with Jez's dog Jazmeen and Jimmy tries to get them together.
15	15	"The Racing Bug"	Steve Schnier	Jordan Voth	June 27, 2009	116
15	15	"Too Many Jimmys"	Scott Oh	Steve Stefanelli	June 27, 2009	116
"The Racing Bug": Jimmy and Beezy have racing fleas, so they run a big race. "Too Many Jimmys": Jimmy copies himself into a bunch of altered clones.
16	16	"Rear Pickle"	Craig Martin	Jamie LeClaire	July 11, 2009	117
16	16	"Clowns Gone Wild"	Jenn Engels	José Pou	July 11, 2009	117
"Rear Pickle": Jimmy believes that his sweet and friendly new neighbor may be the incarnation of his worst fear: she might actually be a giant pickle. "Clowns Gone Wild": Jimmy and Beezy want to join the Rodeo Clown's "Cool Clown Club", but they are not sure how they will manage it.
17	17	"The Masked Jackhammer"	Alan Resnick	Jeff Barker	July 18, 2009	105
17	17	"The Big Drip"	John Slama	Jamie LeClaire	N/A	105
"The Masked Jackhammer": Jimmy becomes a wrestler, but has to fight Heloise. "The Big Drip": Jimmy has to go to the bathroom severely, so he uses Lucius' private bathroom. After using it, Lucius destroys every bathroom in Miseryville.
18	18	"Best Prank Ever"	Alan Resnick	Steve Stefanelli	July 18, 2009	118
18	18	"Bad Horn Day"	Chris Roy	Steve Whitehouse	July 18, 2009	118
"Best Prank Ever": Lucius celebrates his favorite holiday, Lucius Fools Day, by pulling even more dangerous and painful pranks than normal. "Bad Horn Day": Jimmy accidentally cuts off Lucius' horns and must rely on one of Heloise's mystical brews to fix it quickly.
19	19	"Night in the Heinous Museum"	Mark Steinberg	Jordan Voth	July 25, 2009	119
19	19	"I Married a Weavil"	Jenn Engels	Jamie LeClaire	July 25, 2009	119
"Night in the Heinous Museum": Jimmy and Heloise become guards to protect Lucius's important stuff in his museum. "I Married a Weavil": Beezy is forced to marry a Weavil.
20	20	"Meet the Gnomans"	Jay Shore	Nick Cross	August 1, 2009	120
20	20	"There's Always a Hiccup"	Craig Martin	Helder Mendonca	August 1, 2009	120
"Meet the Gnomans": Beezy takes advantage of the Gnomans to defeat Jimmy at every game. "There's Always a Hiccup": Heloise has a bad case of hiccups and it's up to Jimmy and Beezy to help her (for once). In the end, Heloise accidentally kisses Beezy.
21	21	"I Am Jimmy"	Mark Steinberg	Phil Lafrance	October 10, 2009	123
21	21	"Happy Birthday, Lucius"	Scott Albert	Jeff Barker & Mike Smukavic	October 10, 2009	123
"I Am Jimmy": Everyone in Miseryville is in hibernation except Jimmy. "Happy Birthday, Lucius": Lucius goes mute so Jimmy helps him on his birthday until Jimmy takes advantage.
22	22	"Fused Together"	Terry Saltsman	Steve Stefanelli	October 17, 2009	121
22	22	"Bus Driving BFF"	Craig Martin	Riccardo Durante	October 17, 2009	121
"Fused Together": Heloise gets revenge when Jimmy spends too much time with Beezy and shows up late to hang out with her. She uses her latest invention to bring the boys together...permanently! "Bus Driving BFF": When Jimmy saves Chuck the Bus Driver's life, he soon becomes annoyed with how much time the rescued chauffeur is wanting to spend with him.
23	23	"Rocket Jimmy"	Alan Resnick	Kyle Marshall	October 24, 2009	122
23	23	"Pet Rocky"	Craig Martin	Helder Mendonca	October 24, 2009	122
"Rocket Jimmy": Jimmy and Lucius travel to fight a Lunar monster. "Pet Rocky": Beezy gets a pet rock who likes Jimmy more than him. Beezy gets jealous of them both, so Heloise helps him get his pet rock back.
24	24	"No Rules, Rulez Jimmy"	Steve Schnier	Steve Stefanelli	October 31, 2009	124
24	24	"Best Bud Battle"	Scott Oh	Jamie LeClaire	October 31, 2009	124
"No Rules, Rulez Jimmy": Jimmy can't stand having too many rules in Miseryville. "Best Bud Battle": After Cerbee runs off with Jimmy's house, Beezy and Heloise fight to keep Jimmy as their houseguest.
25	25	"Heloise's Big Secret"	Scott Albert	Phil Lafrance	November 7, 2009	125
25	25	"Jimmy in the Big House"	Scott Oh	Jamie LeClaire	November 7, 2009	125
"Heloise's Big Secret": Jimmy and Beezy find out Heloise's big secret --- a bunch of "lame" dolls. "Jimmy in the Big House": After breaking into an animal jail to free Cerbee, Jimmy and Beezy get stuck.
26	26	"Scent of a Heinous"	Scott Albert	Steve Stefanelli	November 14, 2009	126
26	26	"There Will Be Chocolate"	Jenn Engles	José Pou	November 14, 2009	126
"Scent of a Heinous": Jimmy messes up Lucius' personal body spray brand, "Heinous", with gassy beans. "There Will Be Chocolate": When Jimmy, Beezy, and Heloise discover Lucius' chocolate reserve, they start getting greedy.

=== Season 2 (2010–11) ===
No. overall	No. in season	Title	Written by	Storyboard by	Original release date	Prod. code
27	1	"Dance, Jimmy, Dance"	Story by : Alex Galatis; Teleplay by : Scott Oleszkowicz	Mark Ackland	October 30, 2010	201
27	1	"Jimmy and Beezy on the Run"	Story by : Alex Galatis; Teleplay by : Alan Resnick	Jeff Barker	October 30, 2010	201
"Dance, Jimmy, Dance": Jimmy catches Heloise and Beezy sneaking off to enter a dance contest. After they tell him he can't dance with them, he decides to enter by himself. "Jimmy and Beezy on the Run": Jimmy and Beezy leave Miseryville when they believe they've broken something valuable.
28	2	"Beezy J. Genius"	Story by : Alex Galatis; Teleplay by : Scott Albert	Jamie Mason	November 6, 2010	202
28	2	"My Best Friend's a Weavil"	Jenn Engels	Riccardo Durante	November 6, 2010	202
"Beezy J. Genius": When Heloise makes a machine to make herself more intelligent, Beezy accidentally becomes smarter instead. "My Best Friend's a Weavil": After Lucius forbids Beezy from hanging out with Jimmy, he pranks his father by pretending to be friends with a Weavil.
29	3	"Air Force None"	Story by : Alex Galatis; Teleplay by : Scott Albert	Steve Daye	November 13, 2010	203
29	3	"Panda-Monium"	Story by : Alex Galatis; Teleplay by : Craig Martin	Helder Mendonca	November 13, 2010	203
"Air Force None": After Heloise builds a marvelous plane for Lucius, Jimmy sneaks on board with a dream to fly it. "Panda-Monium": When Beezy catches Heloise saving a panda (or what he thinks is saving) he and Jimmy decide to start a Heloise fan club for all the pandas who now adore her.
30	4	"You Can't Keep a Heinous Down"	Scott Oleszkowicz	Riccardo Durante	November 20, 2010	204
30	4	"The Terrific Trio"	Story by : Craig Martin; Teleplay by : Alex Galatis	Jeff Barker	November 20, 2010	204
"You Can't Keep a Heinous Down": When Beezy sells all of Lucius's riches for Lemonade, it is up to Jimmy to help Lucius get rich again. "The Terrific Trio": When Lucius is attacked by a horrifying monster, Beezy and Jimmy offer to help, but Heloise believes she can do a better job. The three of them get into a fight over who can be the best hero.
31	5	"Spring Broke"	Jenn Engels	Mark Ackland	November 27, 2010	205
31	5	"Zombie Pickle"	Craig Martin	Lyndon Ruddy	November 27, 2010	205
"Spring Broke": When a very special flower blooms, Lucius declares spring break in Miseryville and everyone is heading to Misery Island (the non-miserable side) to celebrate. Jimmy and Beezy take a rocket there but end up on the other side of the island, thinking it is the right side. Meanwhile, Heloise waits for Jimmy to arrive. "Zombie Pickle": Miseryville is taken over by Zombie Pickles and it is up to Jimmy to save the town from disaster.
32	6	"Bad Luck Jimmy"	Scott Albert	Helder Mendonca	January 8, 2011	206
32	6	"Misery Hearts"	Alan Resnick	Steve Daye	January 8, 2011	206
"Bad Luck Jimmy": When Jimmy swallows an invention of Heloise's that causes bad luck, he accidentally brings misery everywhere he goes. "Misery Hearts": Heloise has a romance novel about two characters who are like her and Jimmy, but when she finds out the last page is missing she goes on a quest to find the author.
33	7	"High School Mule-Sical"	Story by : Alex Galatis; Teleplay by : Jenn Engels	Jeff Barker	January 15, 2011	207
33	7	"Heloise Schmeloise"	Shelley Hoffman & Robert Pincombe	Brian Coughlan & John Flagg	January 15, 2011	207
"High School Mule-Sical": When Beezy hires a mule to be the star of his talent show, Jimmy becomes jealous and gets help from Heloise to sabotage the mule. "Heloise Schmeloise": When Heloise creates a robot duplicate of herself as her assistant, Jimmy falls in love with it. Heloise becomes jealous and tries to get rid of the replica Schmeloise.
34	8	"Jimmy New-Shoes"	Deborah Jarvis	Riccardo Durante	January 22, 2011	208
34	8	"What's Up with Heloise?"	Scott Albert	Mark Ackland	January 22, 2011	208
"Jimmy New-Shoes": Jimmy gets a new pair of shoes, but soon finds he misses his old ones. "What's Up with Heloise?": Heloise begins to act strangely when her aunt comes to visit.
35	9	"Everyone Can Whistle"	Jenn Engels	Jeff Amey	January 29, 2011	209
35	9	"Heads Will Roll"	Alan Resnick	Helder Mendonca	January 29, 2011	209
"Everyone Can Whistle": Jimmy is the only one in Miseryville that can't whistle, so he gets help from a pickpocket named Peep. "Heads Will Roll": To steal a Mad Scientist's Award, Dr. Scientist makes Heloise sneeze off her own head.
36	10	"She Loves Me"	Craig Martin	Lyndon Ruddy	February 5, 2011	210
36	10	"Heinous vs. Clown"	Scott Oleszkowicz	Steve Daye	February 5, 2011	210
"She Loves Me": Jimmy and Beezy fall for a girl named Arianna. They have a competition to see which of them Arianna likes more. "Heinous vs. Clown": Jimmy, Beezy, Heloise, and Lucius all pull pranks on the clowns that ultimately backfire.
37	11	"Bird Brained"	Shelley Hoffman & Robert Pincombe	Jeff Barker	March 12, 2011	211
37	11	"The Mysterious Mr. Ten"	Jay Shore	Dermot Walshe	March 12, 2011	211
"Bird Brained": When Lucius' deciding bird, Lovey, flies away, Jimmy, Beezy, and Heloise go out to find her so Lucius will give them his giant TV. "The Mysterious Mr. Ten": Jimmy can make anyone in Miseryville laugh except for a creepy man named Mr. Ten because Heloise stopped him from laughing again.
38	12	"Heloise's Secret Admirer"	Scott Oleszkowicz	Mark Ackland	March 19, 2011	212
38	12	"Miseryville Marathon"	Alan Resnick	Riccardo Durante	March 19, 2011	212
"Heloise's Secret Admirer": When Heloise receives a gift and a letter from J2S, she believes that it's from Jimmy but turns out it's from Peep, she then goes on a date with him when she finds out Jimmy's jealous. "Miseryville Marathon": Miseryville is holding a father-son race and Lucius wants to win but Beezy is lazy, so he lets Jimmy run in Beezy's place until Beezy gets mad at his dad's choice. Will the Heinouses win or will the Weavils win?
39	13	"Lucius Lost"	Scott Albert	Steve Daye	March 26, 2011	213
39	13	"Something About Herman"	Craig Martin	Lyndon Ruddy	March 26, 2011	213
"Lucius Lost": Lucius uses all the water in Miseryville for his own pool, and ends up getting stuck on an island with Jimmy. Meanwhile, Heloise has a picnic she had set up for her and Jimmy which Beezy crashes. "Something About Herman": When Heloise finds out Jimmy and Beezy had a secret list of "Guy Stuff" they won't let her see, she disguises herself as a boy named Herman to steal it - while Herman is actually Heloise's temperamental cousin.
40	14	"A Present for Jez"	Deborah Jarvis	Jeff Barker	April 2, 2011	214
40	14	"Funny Face-Off"	Miles Smith	Jeff Amey	April 2, 2011	214
"A Present For Jez": Jimmy accidentally turns a compliment doll into an insulting one. "Funny Face-Off": Jimmy challenges the Rodeo Clowns to a funny face-off.
41	15	"Samy's New Gig"	Miles Smith	Helder Mendonca	April 9, 2011	215
41	15	"The Clean Sneak"	Josh Gal	Chris Labonte	April 9, 2011	215
"Samy's New Gig": After Samy gets fired, Jimmy tries to help him with his acting career, but instead Samy works for the Weavils by telling embarrassing jokes about Lucius. "The Clean Sneak": A mysterious person cleans up Miseryville and Detective Jimmy wants to solve it.
42	16	"Six Over Seven"	Deborah Jarvis	Mark Ackland	April 16, 2011	216
42	16	"The Outsiders"	Jay Shore	Riccardo Durante	April 16, 2011	216
"Six Over Seven": Beezy reunites his relationship with his grandfather which makes Lucius jealous. "The Outsiders": Jimmy hides an alien outsider from the military.
43	17	"The Great Horn Fairy"	Alan Resnick	Steve Daye	April 23, 2011	217
43	17	"The Collectors"	Scott Albert	Dermot Walshe	April 23, 2011	217
"The Great Horn Fairy": Beezy loses a horn and is waiting for a visit from the Great Horn Fairy because when you lose a horn, you get gold, so Jimmy pretends to break a horn and is put on a trial. "The Collectors": When Jimmy cleans Beezy's house, he throws out all of Beezy's ABC gum collection, so Jimmy must go through Miseryville to bring back all of the gum.
44	18	"The Hooded Chicken"	Jenn Engels	Jeff Barker	April 30, 2011	218
44	18	"Make No Allowances"	Craig Martin	Jeff Amey	April 30, 2011	218
"The Hooded Chicken": Jimmy and Beezy start wondering what Heloise's feet look like, which drives her crazy. So she and Lucius team up to scare Jimmy and Beezy. "Make No Allowances": Beezy uses his allowance to buy almost everything in Miseryville until Lucius takes all of it.
45	19	"Generation Text"	Scott Albert	Riccardo Durante	May 7, 2011	219
45	19	"Snowrilla"	Jay Shore	Mark Ackland	May 7, 2011	219
"Generation Text": Jimmy and Beezy are using apps on their MiseryPhones which leads them, Heloise, and Lucius to be held captive by the Schwartzentiger. "Snowrilla": Jimmy reveals the secret about a hidden Miseryville snowrilla named Mitch and Bob, so Lucius then sets out for their fur coat.
46	20	"Going Green"	Miles Smith	Helder Mendonca	July 12, 2011	220
46	20	"My So-Called Loaf"	Josh Gal	Steve Daye & Steve Stefanelli	July 12, 2011	220
"Going Green": The residents of Miseryville complain about the conditions of the city, so Lucius Heinous VII creates a "suggestion box" for everyone to put their ideas in. Although it was simply made so Lucius wouldn't have to deal with everyone's problems, Jimmy sets out to actually improve Miseryville. "My So-Called Loaf": Jimmy creates the perfect sandwich, but a wild-west cowboy, "Cowboy Stackhouse", claims it and believes it to be a real lady. Jimmy must then convince him the sandwich is actually alive.
47	21	"Better Sweater"	Shelley Hoffman & Robert Pincombe	Joe Giampapa	July 13, 2011	221
47	21	"Jimmy on the Spot"	Mark Steinberg	Steve Daye	July 13, 2011	221
"Better Sweater": Heloise knits a love-sweater for Jimmy and a fear-sweater for Beezy, but her plan backfires when the boys decide to switch sweaters. "Jimmy on the Spot": Jimmy does a favor by standing on a spot for a rhino-man and unknowingly participates in a contest requiring someone to stand on the rock for 24 hours straight, after which the winner will receive all of Lucius' fortune, so Lucius uses several plans to get Jimmy off the spot before time runs out but they all backfire.
48	22	"Jimmy's Life Goal"	Mark Evestaff	Jeff Barker	July 13, 2011	222
48	22	"Heinous on Ice"	Edward Kay	Jeff Amey	July 13, 2011	222
"Jimmy's Life Goal": Jimmy wants to play as a goalie with Wreckem, but he doesn't play well, so Heloise gives Jimmy help from the sidelines in exchange for Jimmy spending time with her, but Jimmy spends all of his time with Wreckem and none with Heloise, so she quits helping him and makes Jimmy play on his own. But Jimmy turns out to be an average player. "Heinous on Ice": It is Lucius Heinous VI's birthday, so he is thawed out for the whole day and Lucy makes Jimmy spend time with him, but all Lucius VI wants to do is spend some time with him. But when LHVI tricks Jimmy into bringing Lucius over, he freezes his son and takes over Miseryville. Now Jimmy and Lucius must devise a way to take Miseryville back.
49	23	"Toast Busters"	Craig Martin	Mark Ackland	July 14, 2011	223
49	23	"Beezy 2.0"	Scott Albert	Ricardo Durante	July 14, 2011	223
"Toast Busters": Jimmy begins being haunted by a ghost couple who originally lived in his house. They need his help to retrieve a toaster they lent Lucius years ago to travel back to Ghostville. "Beezy 2.0": Worried that Beezy will embarrass him at a new statue unveiling, Lucius attempts to reform Beezy into a gentleman, with some help from Butley.
50	24	"Weavil Day"	Miles Smith	Jeff Barker	July 14, 2011	224
50	24	"Heloise's Rival"	Jenn Engels	Steve Daye	July 14, 2011	224
"Weavil Day": Jimmy and Beezy accidentally break a truce between the Heinouses and Weavils on Weavil Day. "Heloise's Rival": A new girl, Mean Jean, moves into Miseryville and challenges Heloise for the title of "Queen of Mean".
51	25	"Bubble Poodle"	Mark Evestaff	Helder Mendonca	July 15, 2011	225
51	25	"Cerbee Come Home"	Meghan Read	Jeff Amey	July 15, 2011	225
"Bubble Poodle": After everyone in Miseryville is blinded, Jimmy takes the opportunity to do everything he's always wanted to. But when the blindness wears off earlier than he expected, he's forced to run around town naked! "Cerbee Come Home": Cerbee saves Lucius' life, so Lucius lavishes him with gifts and luxury. Jimmy then has to convince Cerbee to come back.
52	26	"Good Old Jimmy"	Shelley Hoffman & Robert Pincombe	Helder Mendonca, Mark Ackland & Riccardo Durante	July 15, 2011	226
52	26	"Slime, Slimier, Slimiest"	Josh Gal	Jeff Barker	July 15, 2011	226
"Good Old Jimmy": When Jimmy is denied cool things because he is a child, he uses Heloise's machine to turn him into an adult. Unfortunately, the effects backfire, and he continues to age into an old man. "Slime, Slimier, Slimiest": Lucius gets sick of Jimmy, Heloise, and Beezy bothering him by acting out their favorite show, "Super Slugmeister", so he tricks them into competing against each other for the non-existent role of "Slime", Super Slugmeister's sidekick.

== Broadcast ==
Jimmy Two-Shoes was broadcast in Canada on Teletoon on its English and French-language channels, in the latter case under the name of Jimmy l'Intrépide, with reruns continuing until December 2017. In the United States, it aired on Disney XD, premiering on February 13, 2009. The show began broadcasting in the United Kingdom and Ireland on April 18, 2009, on Jetix, in pair with the show's premiere in the rest of Europe on the same channel. In most of Europe, the series was called Jimmy Cool and it aired mainly on Jetix, Disney Channel, and Disney XD; in Italy, Jimmy Jimmy, and in France it is Jimmy l'Éclate. The New Zealand premiere was in 2010 on TVNZ. The show aired in Southeast Asia on Cartoon Network and Latin America on Nickelodeon starting October 5, 2009; the series had been pre-sold to the channel in 2007. In the MENA, the series aired on MBC 3. In Japan, the series was picked up by Disney, where it aired on Disney XD. One of the characters was voiced by Kikue Umimoto. In Italy, the series aired in the summer of 2010 on Rai 2, as part of the Tutti con Phineas and Ferb strand on Sunday mornings.

A DVD of the series was released on May 28, 2013.

== Reception ==
Common Sense Media described the series as "(a) jumbled stew of violent humor, overly arch wit, and broad jokes that may not be tough for kids to grasp (but may be too silly for grown-ups)", and said that it's best for teens and young adults who still have a juvenile sensibility.

=== Awards ===
Jimmy Two-Shoes won the award for the best animated television program for children for the episode "Toast Busters/Beezy 2.0" at the Awards of Excellence 2013. The series was also nominated for 2 awards for best-animated series or program and best performance in an animated series or program at the 2011 Gemini Awards, but lost to Hot Wheels Battle Force 5.
