= STAR Academy (novel) =

2009 novel by Edward Kay

- Author: Edward Kay
- Language: English
- Genre: Children's novel
- Publisher: Doubleday Canada
- Publication date: September 15, 2009
- Publication place: Canada
- Media type: Trade paperback
- Pages: 256
- ISBN: 978-0-385-66706-7

STAR Academy is a 2009 comedic sci-fi children's novel by Canadian author Edward Kay, who is also the co-creator of the animated series, Jimmy Two-Shoes. The book was published in September 2009, by Random House / Doubleday Canada. (ISBN 978-0-385-66706-7)

STAR Academy has been compared by some to Harry Potter because of its boarding school setting and fantastical elements. However, it is distinct in that it uses science in place of magic and is essentially satirical.

== Plot ==
In her dull hometown of Downview, 11-year-old super-genius Amanda Forsythe is underestimated by teachers and classmates, considered an eccentric because of her advanced scientific theories. As the story begins, Amanda loses a science fair competition at her school because her photon sail spaceship exhibit is too complex for the dimwitted judges (her principal and home room teacher) to comprehend. They make fun of it and instead award the prize to two lame exhibits, one that tries to pass off a thinly disguised vacuum cleaner as a robot, and another that suggests solving the world's hunger problem by re-engineering the genes of Third World children so that they can eat sticks, grass and dirt. Fortunately for Amanda, scouts from the new and prestigious Superior Thinking and Advanced Research (STAR) Academy, are in the audience. They recognize Amanda's brilliance and give her a scholarship to live in residence amongst the 200 most intellectually “ultra-gifted” children on planet Earth. There, they are groomed to become Earth's top scientists of the future, charged with solving humanity's most pressing problems.

Given unlimited funding by “anonymous philanthropists” and run by the enigmatic Headmistress Oppenheimer and Professor Leitspied, as well as George, a flighty but staggeringly intelligent engineer, the academy is the perfect place in which a young super-genius can flourish. Amanda and her classmates, most of them former social outcasts because of their high intelligence, forge friendships with each other and, for the first time in their lives, are truly happy, recognized and appreciated by both faculty and peers. In addition to being able to do unlimited research on their own pet projects, the students are divided into intramural teams, then given identical research challenges, supposedly to encourage friendly competition to accelerate their scientific advancements. Chosen to head one of the intramural teams, Amanda distinguishes herself by leading her group to victory in their first assignment, to devise an electronic means to block bad memories.

It isn't a completely idyllic life for Amanda. She misses her family, and has drawn the ire of fellow student Eugenia Snootman, the vain and manipulative leader of the competing intramural team, and daughter of software magnate Bill Snootman, the richest man on Earth. Eugenia is terribly jealous of Amanda's success, and one night, threatens to scuttle Amanda's future career if she doesn't hand over her scientific secrets for the next intramural assignment: how to transmit electricity through the air to remote underprivileged villages.

Still, nothing can seriously detract from Amanda's enjoyment of life at the academy. That is, until the night Amanda and her three closest friends – Derek Murphy, Evelyn Chiu, and Sanjay Dosanjh - make a terrifying discovery: that the academy is not what it seems. Their teachers are actually aliens from another planet, who were sent as goodwill ambassadors to Earth, but who, with the exception of George, have become drunk on power and want to take over the world. In their natural form, the aliens are hideous spider-like creatures with highly developed brains and strong, exoskeletal bodies. Amanda and her friends learn that Oppenheimer and Leitspied have been using them, that the technologies they have been developing in their intramural competitions are actually components of a larger mechanism the aliens have been devising. Their plan is to beam a signal to every human on earth to block their brain synapses, turning them into mindless slaves. Cut off from outside help, it's up to Amanda, Derek, Evelyn, and Sanjay to outwit the aliens and save the planet.
