= Teletoon Retro =

Former Canadian television channel

- The final logo used from 2013 to 2015
- Country: Canada
- Broadcast area: Nationwide
- Headquarters: Toronto, Ontario

Programming
- Language: English
- Picture format: 1080i HDTV (downscaled to letterboxed 480i for the SDTV feed)

Ownership
- Owner: Astral Media (2007–2013); Corus Entertainment (2007–2015)
- Sister channels: Cartoon Network; Télétoon; Teletoon; Télétoon Rétro

History
- Launched: October 1, 2007; 18 years ago
- Closed: September 1, 2015; 10 years ago
- Replaced by: Cartoon Network; Disney Channel

Teletoon Retro was a Canadian specialty channel that was owned by Corus Entertainment and was based on the Teletoon programming block of the same name. The channel aired classic animated television programs as well as some live-action series.

In 2013, Teletoon Retro, along with its French-language sister channel Télétoon Rétro, was available in over nine million Canadian households combined; having the most subscribers among the digital Canadian specialty channels.

Teletoon Retro was shut down on September 1, 2015, and was either replaced by Cartoon Network or Disney Channel, with Cartoon Network inheriting the channel's CRTC licence and some of its carriage agreements. That channel would later relaunch under Cartoon Network's classic animation brand Boomerang in 2023.

== History ==
Teletoon Retro started as a programming block on Teletoon. On November 24, 2000, Teletoon Canada was given approval by the Canadian Radio-television and Telecommunications Commission (CRTC) to launch a national English language category 2 specialty channel titled Teletoon Retro. The approval would expire and the channel did not launch.

The Teletoon Retro logo used from October 1, 2007, to February 4, 2013

Teletoon revised plans to launch the channel when on October 25, 2005, Teletoon Canada was given another approval to launch Teletoon Retro. The channel was launched at 6:00 PM EST on October 1, 2007, across all major television providers, with its first program being The Bugs Bunny and Tweety Show. To coincide with the channel's launch, Teletoon briefly relaunched the Retro programming block. A French language counterpart, titled Télétoon Rétro, which was given approval to be launched at the same time as Teletoon Retro, was launched on September 4, 2008.

On February 4, 2013, the channel underwent a rebrand with new graphics and bumpers created by John Lee, replacing the "television sets" era from 2009 to 2013, along with a new logo; however, the channel's slogan remained.

On March 4, 2013, Corus Entertainment announced that it would acquire Astral Media's 50% ownership interest in Teletoon Canada (owner of Teletoon, Télétoon, Teletoon Retro, Télétoon Rétro, and Cartoon Network), along with several other properties. The purchase was in relation to Bell Media's acquisition of Astral, which had earlier been rejected by the CRTC in October 2012, but was restructured to allow the sale of certain Astral Media properties in order to allow the purchase to clear regulatory hurdles. Corus's purchase was cleared by the Competition Bureau two weeks later on March 18.

On December 20, 2013, the CRTC approved Corus's full ownership of Teletoon Canada and it was acquired by Corus on January 1, 2014. The channel continued to be owned by Teletoon Canada, which was owned by Corus Entertainment under its Corus Kids division.

On March 1, 2014, a high definition simulcast of the channel was launched. The only two providers to carry it were Cogeco and Bell Fibe TV. The high definition feed was absent on Shaw Direct, SaskTel, Bell MTS, and Telus Optik TV.

In August 2015, Teletoon Retro's website announced that the channel would shut down effective September 1, 2015, along with its French-language counterpoint; some of its programming was moved to the main Teletoon network. The channel shut down at 6:00 AM on that date. On some providers, Teletoon Retro was replaced by either Disney Channel or Cartoon Network. The transition was legally structured so that Cartoon Network would discontinue operating as a separately-licensed service on September 1, 2015, and operate under Teletoon Retro's category B licence instead.

Cartoon Network was ultimately relaunched as the Canadian version of Boomerang on March 27, 2023, with the Cartoon Network brand moving to the channel space formerly held by Teletoon.

== Programming ==
Teletoon Retro primarily aired classic animated programming; its CRTC licence specified that programming had to have been produced at least ten years prior. While primarily devoted to animation, its CRTC licence allowed as much as 10% of its programming to be live action and animated cartoons such as The Bugs Bunny and Tweety Show, Scooby-Doo, The Flintstones and others; it also aired some live-action series, such as Batman, Fraggle Rock, and Mighty Morphin Power Rangers. The network also aired 1980s action-genre cartoons, including Transformers, He-Man and the Masters of the Universe, She-Ra: Princess of Power, ThunderCats, G.I. Joe, Teenage Mutant Ninja Turtles and Inspector Gadget.

== See also ==
- Cartoon Network (Canada)
- Télétoon
- Télétoon Rétro
- Boomerang (Canada)
