= Télétoon =

Canadian French-language children's TV channel

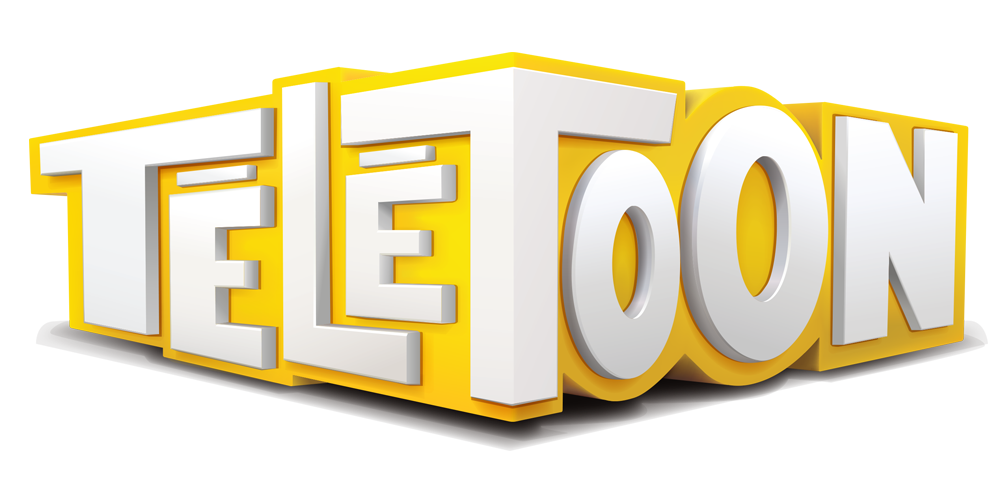
- Logo used since 2014
- Country: Canada (Quebec only)
- Broadcast area: Nationwide
- Headquarters: Montreal, Quebec

Programming
- Languages: French; Audio described
- Picture format: 1080i HDTV (downscaled to letterboxed 480i for the SD feed)

Ownership
- Owner: CINAR (Note: Renamed Cookie Jar in 2004) (1997–2006); Astral Media (1997–2013); Nelvana (1997–1999); Shaw Communications (1997–1999); Western International Communications (1997–2000); Corus Entertainment (1999–present)
- Parent: Teletoon Canada Inc.
- Sister channels: Cartoon Network; Boomerang; YTV; Treehouse TV

History
- Launched: September 8, 1997; 29 years ago

Links
- Website: fr.teletoon.com

Télétoon (stylized as TĒLĒTOON) is a Canadian French language specialty channel owned by Corus Entertainment that broadcasts animated series aimed at children, teenagers, and adults. Its name is a portmanteau of "télévision" and "cartoon".

Télétoon launched on September 8, 1997, as a bilingual service owned by Teletoon Canada, Inc. – a consortium of Western International Communications and Astral Media (via their specialty channel Family Channel), Shaw Communications (via its specialty channel YTV), and the animation studios Cinar and Nelvana. With subsequent acquisitions and divestments, Corus became the sole owner in 2014.

As with Télétoon's English-language counterpart, which launched in October 1997 as "Teletoon", the channel has aired a mix of domestic productions and imported series, with many of the latter coming from U.S. channel Cartoon Network. A Canadian version of Cartoon Network would launch as a sister channel in 2012, under license from Turner Broadcasting. In March 2023, the English-language Teletoon rebranded as a new iteration of Cartoon Network, with the previous Cartoon Network channel rebranding under Turner's secondary animation brand Boomerang.

As of 2013, Télétoon, along with the present-day Cartoon Network, has been available in over 7.3 million Canadian households.

== History ==
It was licensed in 1996 by the Canadian Radio-television and Telecommunications Commission (CRTC). The French-language channel was the first to be launched on September 8, 1997. It used the slogan La station de l'animation ('The Animation Station', the same as that of the contemporary English-language channel), and later added and then switched to Imagine!.

When Télétoon was launched in 1997, it showed more mature fare as the day progressed, with a solid commitment to air diverse and international programming and the ability to air a great majority of material uncut. A typical broadcast day started with preschool content at 7:00 a.m. EST and ended with adult content after midnight, airing more adult cartoons such as Duckman and various anime programs.

In 1999, Télétoon started airing bumpers with its first mascot, Teletina. These bumpers were made by Spin Productions in Toronto. Several more bumpers using CGI animation with some made by Guru Studio premiered on the channel in 2001. An updated look for the channel, no longer featuring the original logo (and fully utilizing the wordmark that introduced as an alternate logo in 2001), was later created for a partial rebranding in 2005. The bumpers were removed in 2007 as part of an on-air rebranding.

On February 5, 2007, Télétoon's on-air appearance and website were dramatically changed, and Le Détour's website was moved to teletoon.com. The look of the channel and the Le Détour block changed.

On September 5, 2011, Télétoon's branding was changed to coincide with the 50th anniversary of co-owner Astral Media and to reflect the transition from analogue to digital television. Télétoon la Nuit's on-air branding was not changed until 2020.

In August 2015, it was announced that Télétoon Rétro would be shutting down, and some series would be moving to Télétoon on September 1.

On February 21, 2023, Corus announced that Teletoon would be rebranded as Cartoon Network on March 27, 2023. No significant changes were made to Télétoon itself, and the "Teletoon" brand also remains active through the Teletoon+ streaming service. The network did not renew its rights for The Simpsons, Family Guy and American Dad in 2025, placing the decision on an exclusivity agreement with Disney+.

=== Changes in ownership ===
When launched, the channel was owned by a consortium made up of various other Canadian specialty services and producers; Family Channel acting as managing partner at 53.3% (in a partnership between Astral Media and Western International Communications), YTV at 26.7% (under Shaw Communications), and Cinar and Nelvana with 10% each.

Changes of ownership have occurred since 1999, starting when Corus Entertainment was spun off from Shaw Communications (who had owned a stake in Télétoon through YTV). In 2000, Western International Communications (who owned a stake in Télétoon through the Family Channel alongside Astral Media) sold its stake in Télétoon to Corus Entertainment. The same year, Corus acquired Nelvana, another company with a stake in Télétoon. Due to a complaint from the CRTC, Corus sold the stake to Astral Media in 2001. Through various acquisitions over the years, Cinar Films, which was renamed Cookie Jar Group in 2004, came to own a 20% stake, and Astral Media and Corus Entertainment each owned a 40% stake. In 2006, Cookie Jar Group sold 10% of its stake in Teletoon to each of Astral and Corus, leading the two companies to each own 50% of Télétoon.

On March 4, 2013, Corus Entertainment announced that it would acquire Astral Media's 50% ownership interest in Teletoon Canada (owner of Teletoon, Télétoon, Teletoon Retro, Télétoon Rétro, and Cartoon Network). The purchase concerned Bell Media's pending takeover of Astral. The CRTC had rejected the takeover in October 2012. Still, it was restructured to allow the sale of certain Astral Media properties so that the purchase could clear regulatory barriers. Bell filed a new application for the proposed takeover with the CRTC on March 6, 2013. Corus's purchase was cleared by the Competition Bureau on March 18; the CRTC approved the Bell-Astral merger on June 27, 2013. On December 20, 2013, the CRTC approved Corus's full ownership of Teletoon Canada and it was purchased by Corus on January 1, 2014. The channel continues to be owned by Teletoon Canada, now wholly owned by Corus Entertainment under its Corus Kids and Corus Média divisions.

== Programming ==
Many of the programs broadcast on Télétoon are French-dubbed versions of those shown on its English-language counterpart. Initially, both channels had identical schedules, airing the same episode of the same program at the same time. Over time, their programming began to differ; Télétoon carries some translated programs that its English-language counterpart did not, as they are aired on other English cable networks. Many of the shows, such as The Simpsons and King of the Hill, receive Canadian French dubs and as such are aired here, while others (such as Naruto and virtually all series originating from Cartoon Network in the U.S) utilize their European French dubs (whether produced in France or Belgium).

=== Original series ===
At its inception in 1997, the channel had a stated goal of producing 78 half-hours of original content every year, and it has been active in commissioning programming since then. The licence granted by the Canadian Radio-television and Telecommunications Commission (CRTC) in 1996 required a gradual increase in the portion of Canadian programming on the schedule by about five percent each year starting from 40% in its first year of operation to 60% by 2002. In 1998, network management decided to focus on renewals instead of new shows – adopting a more cautious strategy than launching a significant number of new series, as it had in the prior year. By 2001, however, the station was noted as possibly being the Canadian channel with the highest spending on original production, having invested in 98 series, including 225 half-hour episodes that fall season.

As a bilingual service, Teletoon/Télétoon maintained two separate broadcast feeds, with a single licence for the English- and French-language channels. It was one of only two Canadian specialty services with such a licence. At the original licensing hearing before the CRTC, the network's operators had stated that the two channels "would be similar in nature and programmed with a similar attitude towards them. But for the reasons of rights availability, for the reasons of the question of advertising to children in Québec and for the reason of dealing with the differences in the market, there might be variations in the services offered." To this end a requirement that all original programming be delivered in both languages was instituted. It had been relaxed to apply "whenever possible" by 2007 as market differences between English and Québecois/French-originated programming became more apparent, and over the following years some original series only appeared on one of the channels.

=== Current programming ===
As of November 2026:

- Batwheels
- Beyblade X
- Bravest Warriors
- Bugs Bunny Constructeurs (Bugs Bunny Builders)
- Défis extrêmes (Total Drama)
- Garderie extrême (Total DramaRama)
- Hôtel Transylvanie (Hotel Transylvania)
- Il pleut des hamburgers (Cloudy with a Chance of Meatballs)
- Jellystone!
- Looney Tunes Cartoons
- Mes aventures avec Superman (My Adventures with Superman)
- Le Monde Merveilleusement Bizarre de Gumball (The Wonderfully Weird World of Gumball)
- Mysticons
- Peppa Pig
- Pikwik Pack
- Pokémon
- La Quête héroïque du valeureux Prince Ivandoe (The Heroic Quest of the Valiant Prince Ivandoe)
- Regular Show: Les Cassettes Oubliées (Regular Show: The Lost Tapes)
- Ruben et Cie (Rubble and Crew)
- Scooby-Doo et Compagnie (Scooby-Doo and Guess Who?)
- Teen Titans Go!
- Tiny Toons Looniversity

=== Former programming ===
- Les 3 Amigonautes (3 Amigonauts)
- 3 et Moi (My Life Me)
- 6teen
- Ace Ventura (Ace Ventura: Pet Detective)
- Adventure Time avec Finn et Jake (Adventure Time with Finn and Jake)
- Adventure Time: Le Pays Magique (Adventure Time: Distant Lands)
- Adventure Time: Fionna et Cake (Adventure Time: Fionna and Cake)
- Affreux Vilains Martiens (Butt-Ugly Martians)
- Air Academy (Flight Squad)
- Les Amis ratons (The Raccoons)
- Angela Anaconda
- Angry Birds Toons
- Aquaman: le roi d'Atlantis (Aquaman: King of Atlantis)
- Arc-en-ciel le plus beau poisson des océans (Rainbow Fish)
- Archie, Mystères et Compagnie (Archie's Weird Mysteries)
- Atomic Betty (G)
- Atomic Puppet
- Avengers: L'équipe des supers héros (The Avengers: Earth's Mightiest Heroes)
- Avengers Rassemblement (Avengers Assemble)
- Les aventures d'Ollivier (Olliver's Adventures)
- Les Aventures d'une mouche (Fly Tales)
- Les Aventures de l'Ours Paddington (The Adventures of Paddington Bear)
- Axel et les Power Players
- Baby Looney Tunes
- Bagel et Becky (The Bagel and Becky Show)
- Bakugan Battle Brawlers
- Bakugan: Battle Planet
- Barbe-Rouge (Captain Red Beard)
- Les Baskerville (The Baskervilles)
- Batman (Batman: The Animated Series)
- Batman (The Batman)
- Batman : L'Alliance des héros (Batman: The Brave and the Bold)
- Batman, la relève (Batman Beyond)
- Battle B-Daman (B-Daman Crossfire)
- Beetlejuice
- Ben 10 (2005)
- Ben 10 (2016)
- Ben 10: Alien Force
- Ben 10: Omniverse
- Ben 10: Ultimate Alien
- Benjamin (Franklin)
- Benjamin et ses amis (Franklin and Friends)
- Bric-a-Brac
- Bêtes comme chien (2 Stupid Dogs)
- Bêtes à craquer (Animal Crackers)
- Beyblade
- Beyblade Burst
- Beyblade: Metal Fusion
- Billy the Cat, dans la peau d'un chat (Billy the Cat)
- Billy et Mandy, aventuriers de l'au-delà (The Grim Adventures of Billy & Mandy)
- Bip Bip et Coyote (The Road Runner Show)
- Bizzareville (Freaktown)
- Blaise le blasé (Fred's Head)
- Blake et Mortimer (Blake and Mortimer)
- Clone High
- Bob et Scott (Bob and Scott)
- Boni
- La Boucle (Looped)
- Bratz
- Bugs Bunny et Tweety (The Bugs Bunny & Tweety Show)
- Bugs et les Looney Tunes (New Looney Tunes)
- Builder Brothers: Fabrique de rêves (Builder Brothers Dream Factory)
- Bunnicula
- Ça passe ou ça casse (Hole in the Wall)
- Cadillacs et Dinosaures (Cadillacs and Dinosaurs)
- Caillou
- Camp Lazlo
- Camp Marécage (Camp Lakebottom)
- Capitaine Star (Captain Star)
- Carl au carré (Carl²)
- Carrément chat (Counterfeit Cat)
- Ce Cher Ed (Best Ed)
- Changelin, le jeune loup solitaire (Beast Boy: Lone Wolf)
- Chaotic
- Charlotte's Web
- Chop Chop Ninja
- Chop Chop Ninja Challenge
- Chop Socky Chooks
- Chowder
- Les Chroniques de Matt Hatter (Matt Hatter Chronicles)
- Ciné-maniac (Home movies)
- La Classe en Délire (The Kids from Room 402)
- Classe des Titans (Class of the Titans)
- Cléo et Chico (Cow and Chicken)
- Colis de la Planète X (Packages from Planet X)
- Collège Rhino Véloce (Flying Rhino Junior High)
- Courage, le chien froussard (Courage the Cowardly Dog)
- Cracké (Cracked)
- Creepschool
- Crypte Show (Tales from the Cryptkeeper)
- Cupcake et Dino: Services en tout genre (Cupcake and Dino: General Services)
- Cybersix
- DC Super Hero Girls
- Défis extrêmes : L'absurdicourse (Total Drama Presents the Ridiculous Race)
- Delilah et Julius (Delilah & Julius)
- Di-Gata les défenseurs (Di-Gata Defenders)
- Digimon
- Dilbert
- Dinofroz
- D.N. Ace
- Donkey Kong
- Douggy et Pony font leur show (The Dog and Pony Show)
- Dr. Pantastique (Dr. Dimensionpants)
- DreamWorks Dragons
- Drôles de colocs (Endangered Species)
- Drôle de voyou (Bad Dog)
- Duck Dodgers
- Eckhart
- Ed, Edd et Eddy (Ed, Edd, and Eddy)
- Édouard (Edward)
- Edouard et Martin (Marvin the Tap-Dancing Horse)
- Matt et les Monstres (Matt's Monsters)
- Les Enquêtes de Miss Mallard (A Miss Mallard Mystery)
- Épopée vers l'Ouest - La Légende du singe roi (Journey to the West – Legends of the Monkey King)
- Les Exploits d'Arsène Lupin (Night Hood)
- Fifi Brindacier (Pippi Longstocking)
- Foster, la maison des amis imaginaires (Foster's Home for Imaginary Friends)
- Les Fous du volant (1968) (Wacky Races (1968))
- Les Fous du volant (2017) (Wacky Races (2017))
- Frankie et les ZhuZhu Pets (The ZhuZhus)
- Fred des Cavernes (Fred the Caveman)
- Les Fungies (The Fungies!)
- Fusée XL5 (Fireball XL5)
- Le futur est .... wow ! (The Future is Wild)
- Futz!
- GeoFreakZ
- George de la jungle (George of the Jungle)
- Gerald McBoing-Boing
- Glurp Attack (Grossology)
- Gormiti (2018)
- Grabujband (Grojband)
- Les Graffitos (Stickin' Around)
- Green Lantern
- Gremlins
- Gribouille (Doodlez)
- Hamtaro (2002)
- Harry et ses dinosaures (Harry and His Bucket Full of Dinosaurs)
- L'Heure de la terreur (R.L. Stine's The Haunting Hour)
- Hot Wheels Battle Force 5
- Hulk et les agents du S.M.A.S.H (Hulk and the Agents of S.M.A.S.H.)
- Iggy Arbuckle
- Inspecteur Gadget (2015) (Inspector Gadget (2015))
- Invincible Fight Girl
- Iron Man: Armored Adventures
- Ivanhoé
- Jessica et son petit monde (Jessica's Big Little World)
- Les Jetson (The Jetsons)
- Jimmy délire (Out of Jimmy's Head)
- Jimmy l'Intrépide (Jimmy Two-Shoes)
- Johnny Bravo
- Johnny Test
- Les Jumeaux Zimmer (The Zimmer Twins)
- Juniper Lee (The Life and Times of Juniper Lee)
- Kappa Mikey
- Kaput et Zösky (Kaput & Zösky)
- Kid Paddle
- Le Laboratoire de Dexter (Dexter's Laboratory)
- Le Lapinet Discret (Untalkative Bunny)
- Les Lapins Crétins Invasion (Rabbids Invasion)
- La Légende de Calamity Jane (The Legend of Calamity Jane)
- Legends of Chima
- Lego City Adventures
- Lego Hero Factory
- Lego Nexo Knights
- Lego Ninjago
- La ligue des justiciers : Action (Justice League Action)
- La ligue des justiciers: Nouvelle génération (Young Justice)
- Looney Tunes
- Ma gardienne est un vampire (My Babysitter's a Vampire)
- Marguerite et la Bête Féroce (Maggie and the Ferocious Beast)
- Le Magicien d'Oz : Dorothy et ses amis (Dorothy and the Wizard of Oz)
- Medabots
- Méga Bébés (Mega Babies)
- Mega Souhait (Super Wish)
- MegaMan NT Warrior
- Megas XLR
- MetaJets
- Mike, Lu et Og (Mike, Lu & Og)
- Les Mini-Tuques (Snowsnaps)
- Minus et Cortex (Pinky and the Brain)
- Moi Willy, fils de rock-star (My Dad the Rock Star)
- Mon copain de classe est un singe (My Gym Partner's a Monkey)
- Mon derrière perd la tête (The Day My Butt Went Psycho!)
- Le Monde de Blaster (Blaster's Universe)
- Le Monde de Quest (World of Quest)
- Le Monde incroyable de Gumball (The Amazing World of Gumball)
- Monsieur Belette (I Am Weasel)
- Moumoute, un mouton dans la ville (Sheep in the Big City)
- ¡Mucha Lucha!
- Mudpit
- Mythologies : les gardiens de la légende (Mythic Warriors: Guardians of the Legend)
- Nanook (Nanook's Great Hunt)
- Naruto (8+/13+)
- Ned et son triton (Ned's Newt)
- Nom de code : Kids Next Door (Codename: Kids Next Door)
- Nouvelle Ligue des justiciers (Justice League Unlimited)
- Oh non ! Des aliens ! (Oh No! It's an Alien Invasion!)
- Ollie et le monstrosac (Ollie's Pack)
- Les Oursons Du Square Théodore (The Upstairs Downstairs Bears)
- Ozzy et Drix (Ozzy & Drix)
- Patates et Dragons (Potatoes and Dragons)
- Patrouille 03 (Patrol 03)
- Au pays des Têtes à claques (Knuckleheads)
- Pecola
- Pète le vœu (Wishfart)
- La Petite Patrouille (Toad Patrol)
- Les Pierrafeu (The Flintstones)
- Pingu
- Pirate Express
- Planète Sketch (Planet Sketch)
- Poochini
- PorCité (Pig City)
- Pour le meilleur et pour le pire (For Better or For Worse)
- Pourquoi pas Mimi ? (What About Mimi?)
- Power Rangers
- Prenez garde à Batman ! (Beware the Batman)
- Quoi d'neuf, Scooby-Doo ? (What's New, Scooby-Doo?)
- Ratz
- Redakai, les conquerants du Kairu (Redakai: Conquer the Kairu)
- Redwall
- Regular Show
- Ren et Stimpy (The Ren & Stimpy Show)
- La retenue (Detentionaire)
- Ricky Sprocket (Ricky Sprocket: Showbiz Boy)
- Rien Que Des Monstres (Nothing But Monsters)
- Robin des Bois Junior (Young Robin Hood)
- RoboBlatte (RoboRoach)
- Rocko et compagnie (Rocko's Modern Life)
- Sabrina, Apprentie Sorcière (Sabrina: The Animated Series)
- Sacré Andy ! (What's with Andy?)
- Sacrés Dragons (Blazing Dragons)
- Sakura, chasseuse de cartes (Cardcaptors Sakura)
- Sam et Max : Privés de police!!! (The Adventures of Sam & Max: Freelance Police)
- Samba et Leuk (Kassai and Luk)
- Sammy et Scooby en folie (Shaggy & Scooby-Doo Get a Clue!)
- Santo Bugito
- Les Saturdays (The Secret Saturdays)
- Les Sauveteurs du monde (Rescue Heroes)
- Scooby-Doo
- Scooby-Doo! Mystère associés (Scooby-Doo! Mystery Incorporated)
- Silverwing
- Simon au pays des dessins à la craie (Simon in the Land of Chalk Drawings)
- Les Simpson (The Simpsons)
- Les Singestronautes (Rocket Monkeys)
- Skatoony
- Sonic le Rebelle (Sonic Underground)
- SOS Fantômes (The Real Ghostbusters)
- Sourire d'enfer (Braceface)
- South Park
- Le Spectaculaire Spider-Man (The Spectacular Spider-Man)
- Spider Riders
- Spiez, nouvelle génération (The Amazing Spiez!)
- Splat!
- Splatalot!
- Star Wars: The Clone Wars
- Starship Troopers
- Stoked : Ça va surfer ! (Stoked)
- Super Académie (Sidekick)
- The Super Hero Squad Show
- Les Supers Nanas (The Powerpuff Girls)
- Super Zéro (The Tick)
- Supernoobs
- Le Surfer d'Argent (Silver Surfer)
- Têtes à claques
- Thundercats RRRR (Thundercats Roar)
- Les Tiny Toons (Tiny Toon Adventures)
- Titi et Grominet mènent l'enquête (The Sylvester & Tweety Mysteries)
- Les Tofou (The Tofus)
- Tom et Jerry (Tom and Jerry)
- Tom et Jerry Tales (Tom and Jerry Tales)
- Le Tom et Jerry Show (2014) (The Tom and Jerry Show (2014))
- Tom et Jerry à New York (Tom and Jerry in New York)
- ToonMarty
- Les Tortues Ninja (2003) (Teenage Mutant Ninja Turtles, 2003)
- Les Tortues Ninja (2012) (Teenage Mutant Ninja Turtles, 2012)
- Ted Sieger's Wildlife (1999)
- Totally Spies!
- Touftoufs et polluards (The Smoggies)
- Transformers: Cybertron
- Transformers: Cyberverse
- Transformers: Energon
- Les Trois Petites Sœurs (The Triplets)
- Trop cool, Scooby-Doo ! (Be Cool, Scooby-Doo!)
- Unikitty!
- Ultimate Spider-Man
- Un écureuil chez moi (Squirrel Boy)
- Un monstre en boîte (Monster in a Box)
- Un trésor dans mon jardin (A Treasure in My Garden)
- Va-t'en Licorne (Go Away, Unicorn!)
- Votez Becky! (Majority Rules!)
- W
- Wally Gator
- Wayside
- Wild C.A.T.s
- Winston et Dudley Ding Dong (Winston Steinburger and Sir Dudley Ding Dong)
- Wolverine et les X-Men (Wolverine and the X-Men)
- X-Men
- Yabba Dabba Dinosaures (Yabba Dabba Dinosaurs)
- Yakkity Yak
- Yogi et ses amis (The Yogi Bear Show)
- Yoko! Jakamoko! Toto!
- Yo-kai Watch
- Yu-Gi-Oh! Arc-V
- Zeroman
- Les Zinzins de l'espace (Space Goofs)
- Les Zybrides (Spliced)

=== Programming blocks ===
==== Current ====
- Vive les samedis – Vive les samedis is a Saturday morning programming block from 7 a.m. to 12 p.m. ET; this block was formerly known as Les dessins animés du samedi matin.
- Cinéma Télétoon – Cinéma Télétoon is a block on Saturdays at 4 p.m. and Sundays at 10 a.m. ET, that mostly airs animated movies (such as Tom and Jerry: The Movie, The Powerpuff Girls Movie and Looney Tunes movies, among others). It also airs live action movies such as the first Teenage Mutant Ninja Turtles movie. This block was formerly known as Cinétoon and Télétoon présente.
- Télétoon la nuit – Airing from 9 p.m. to 3 a.m. daily, this block features animated programming targeted towards teen and adult audiences during the nighttime hours. Formerly known as Le détour sur Télétoon and Télétoon Détour, it was the French version of the now-defunct Teletoon at Night block; both of which are similar in format to Cartoon Network's Adult Swim in the U.S.

==== Yearly ====
- Camp Télétoon – the Camp Télétoon block replaces morning programming during the summer vacation period from July to August, containing some of the channel's popular programs, and daily movies. However, in the summer of 2009, Camp Télétoon was placed on hiatus, with Fou rire taking its place. The block returned in the summer of 2012, now airing weeknights from 9:00 to 12:00 a.m. ET.
- C'est Noël – this block features holiday specials.

==== Former ====
- Original blocks – in 1997, Télétoon chose a different style of animation for each block. Each blocks were represented as planets: Claymation for Pre-School (4 a.m. to 3 p.m.), Cel animation for Kids (3 p.m. to 6 p.m.), Collage for Family (6 p.m. to 9 p.m.) and Paper mache for Adult (9 p.m. to 4 a.m.). Each block's bumpers were made by Cuppa Coffee Studios.
- Télétoon Déchaine! – launched in 2000, Télétoon Dechaine! is an adult-oriented block of the channel (the French version of Teletoon Unleashed!); it co-existed with Le Détour sur Télétoon until the block merged with it in 2004. It was known for airing every show with an 18+ rating to attract an adult audience, regardless of whether the program actually contained adults-only material or not. It was discontinued in 2004 due to lack of new content, since 90% of the material were shows with a limited amount of episodes, leading to frequent rerun. It was also found that Le Detour sur Télétoon and Dechaine! attracted a similar mixed audience of teens and adults, hence the amalgamation.
- Télétoon Kapow! – Launched in September 2003, Kapow! was an action block, which featured the shows Teenage Mutant Ninja Turtles, Spider Riders, MegaMan NT Warrior and The Batman. Kapow! was usually shown on weekend mornings in large blocks, although it did air in smaller blocks during the weekdays. Teletoon Kapow! was used as the name of the Canadian Cartoon Network channel license.
- Le Spin – Le Spin was created on September 3, 2007, and air every weekday from 4:00 to 6:00 p.m. with different shows every day. Throughout the week, viewers could vote online on the Télétoon website to pick one show that would air during the Le Spin block. Once a month, five viewers each got to choose the shows for an entire weekday afternoon.
- Fou rire – the Fou rire block aired weekday mornings from 7:00 to 9:00 a.m. ET and on Saturday mornings. It aired shows such as Out of Jimmy's Head, Chowder, and Jimmy Two-Shoes.
- 3 heures vraiment cool – the 3 heures vraiment cool block aired on Monday through Thursdays and Sunday from 6:00 to 9:00 p.m. ET. On Thursdays, it was called Les jeudis vraiment trop cool, and it aired new episodes of The Simpsons, Johnny Test, Jimmy Two-Shoes, Stoked, Total Drama, Majority Rules! and 6teen.
- Télétoon Rétro – Télétoon Rétro was the brand for Télétoon's blocks of classic animated programming. In Fall 2008, a digital channel under the same name was launched, featuring classic animated programs.
- Mission:Action – The Mission:Action block aired on weekdays starting at 4:00 p.m. ET, and on Sunday mornings/afternoons. It featured action series such as The Secret Saturdays, Bakugan Battle Brawlers, Chop Socky Chooks, Batman: The Brave and the Bold, Naruto, Wolverine and the X-Men, Johnny Test, Iron Man: Armored Adventures, Chaotic, Totally Spies!, The Super Hero Squad Show and The Spectacular Spider-Man. New additions included Power Rangers Samurai, The Avengers: Earth's Mightiest Heroes, Hot Wheels Battle Force 5, The Amazing Spiez!, Star Wars: The Clone Wars and Bakugan: Gundalian Invaders.
- Télétoon Jr. - The Télétoon Jr. block aired weekdays starting at 9:00 a.m. ET. A video-on-demand channel also exist which run a different set of series than those featured on the block.
- J'aime les jeudis – J'aime les jeudis is a programming block airing on Thursday evenings from 6 to 9 p.m. ET.
- Les vendredis superhéros – Les vendredis superhéros is an action-oriented programming block airing Friday evenings from 6:30 to 9 p.m. ET.

== Related services ==
On November 24, 2000, the Canadian Radio-television and Telecommunications Commission (CRTC) approved multiple applications from Teletoon Canada Inc. to launch six Category 2 television channels named Teletoon Action, Teletoon Adult, Teletoon Art, Teletoon Multi, Teletoon Pop and Teletoon Retro. None of the channels launched and their broadcast licenses expired on November 24, 2004. The "Teletoon Retro" concept would later be revived under a different license.

=== Télétoon Sur Demande ===
Télétoon Sur Demande is a video on demand channel featuring series from Télétoon.

=== English service ===
Cartoon Network (formerly known as Teletoon) is the English counterpart and sister channel to Télétoon. It broadcasts most of the shows from its French-language counterpart in English, as well as shows acquired from the namesake U.S. cable channel.

=== Télétoon HD ===
On March 24, 2014, Télétoon launched a high definition feed called Télétoon HD, which simulcasts the standard definition feed. The channel is available on Cogeco, Vidéotron, Bell Fibe TV, and Shaw Direct.

=== Télétoon Jr. Sur Demande ===
Télétoon Jr. Sur Demande was a video on demand multiplex channel and was named after a program block featuring animated series aimed at younger children's; shows included on the Télétoon Jr. Sur Demande channel have included such shows as Caillou, Atomic Betty, George of the Jungle, The Future is Wild, and Bobby's World. The service was discontinued some time in 2018.

=== Télétoon Rétro ===
Télétoon Rétro was a Category B digital cable and satellite channel that debuted on September 4, 2008. It was named after a program block featuring classic animated series. Télétoon Rétro channel's programs have included The Tom and Jerry Show, The Bugs Bunny & Tweety Show, Scooby-Doo, The Flintstones, The Raccoons, The Jetsons, Astro Boy, and Fat Albert and the Cosby Kids. The channel shut down on September 1, 2015, and was replaced by La Chaîne Disney.
