= Olliver's Adventures =

Canadian animated television series

- Genre: Comedy; Adventure
- Created by: Edward Kay
- Directed by: Ron Ducette; Brian Howald
- Voices of: Joanne Miller
- Composer: Blain Morris
- Country of origin: Canada
- Original language: English
- No. of seasons: 3
- No. of episodes: 39 (117 shorts); 1 special

Production
- Executive producers: Michael-Andreas Kuttner; Steven J.P. Comeau; Beth Stevenson
- Producers: Suzanne Chapman; James Nicholson
- Editor: Christopher Cooper
- Running time: 22 minutes (7 minutes per segment)
- Production companies: Decode Entertainment; Collideascope Digital Productions

Original release
- Network: Teletoon
- Release: September 3, 2002 – March 20, 2005

Olliver's Adventures is a Canadian animated television series that originally aired on Teletoon on September 3, 2002, with the first 13 episodes. It was produced in Flash by Collideascope Digital Productions and Decode Entertainment and consists of 117 shorts or 39 episodes of 3 shorts each, along with a pilot special.

== Plot ==
The show is about a young boy named Olliver (Ollie) who invents a world of his own using his imagination, creating stories that reconfigure his everyday life and impressions of the world into epic adventures.

== Characters ==
Ollie (voiced by Joanne Miller) usually has his toys as his companions:

- Jorge the iguana (voiced by Glenn Lefchak)
- Trog the strong caveman
- Tara the woman (voiced by Tara Doyle)
- Zoomerax the alien
- Beano the dog is Olliver's pet
- The Giant Big Sisters (Ashley, Leslie and Monja) are a trio of bullied siblings
- Mom and Dad are parents

== Episodes ==
=== Pilot special ===
The pilot special, written by Edward Kay and directed by Sean Scott, was named Ollie's Under-the-Bed Adventures and won a Gemini Award for Best Animated Program. It consists of 10 two-minute shorts, and premiered on Teletoon on April 15, 2001.

=== Season 1 (2002) ===
No. overall	No. in season	Title	Original release date
1	1	"Ice Storm / Albertasaur-I-Oh! / Saving Sublantis"	TBA
2	2	"Air Show / Tales of an Arabian Fright / Wise Man on the Mountain"	TBA
3	3	"Ollie Hood and His Merry Men / Honey, I Shrunk the Jorge / The Aliens Are Coming!"	TBA
4	4	"Sufferin' Sasquatch / Clone Alone / Asteroid Belt"	TBA
5	5	"Time Out / The Great Escape / Back Seat Driver"	TBA
6	6	"Hectic Celtic / Choc-O-Files / Attack of the 50-Foot Furball"	TBA
7	7	"Vikings from Space / He's Got the Whole World in His Hands / Tremors"	TBA
8	8	"Warpo General Hospital / Toys R' Bust / The Weakest Don't Think"	TBA
9	9	"Wish Hard / It's a Fullawart's Life / Olliver and the Beanstalk"	TBA
10	10	"Raisin a Stink / What a Pain in the Neck / Wolfman Zack"	TBA
11	11	"Waiting for Mummy / Abominable Snow, Man / Cool Etudes"	TBA
12	12	"Who Is Taylor Irksome / Jorge-Zilla / Kidsky & Clutch"	TBA
13	13	"Tooth Loose / Being Cray Baddie / Whale of a Time"	TBA

=== Season 2 (2003) ===
No. overall	No. in season	Title	Original release date
14	1	"Olliver Fast Sledder / Tall Ships Ahoy! / Kids with Brooms"	TBA
15	2	"Surf and Turf / Cringing Ollie Out of Sight Johnny / Don't Worry, Be Quiet"	TBA
16	3	"Re-Energized / Slippery Slope! / Out of the Bean Can Into the Beano"	TBA
17	4	"Boy vs. Grasshopper / A Pound of Cure / New Best Friend"	TBA
18	5	"Ollie Ollie Odyssey / Bus Stop / Real Re-Ollity"	TBA
19	6	"The Green Rabbit / Dumpelstirback / Off Side"	TBA
20	7	"Dinosaur Taunter / Eye of the Volcano / Planet of the Rats"	TBA
21	8	"Sweaters Galore / Fooling Father Time / Christmas Past Perfect"	TBA
22	9	"Scaredy Witch / The Good, the Bad, and the Ollie / The Headless Janitor"	TBA
23	10	"All Hands on Deck / May I Take Your Order / Bored Sick"	TBA
24	11	"Two Leagues Under the Sea / Kung Pow Panda / Duck, Duck, Switcheroo!"	TBA
25	12	"Babysitter's School / Mirrorland / Ollie and the Hermit Crab"	TBA
26	13	"Stanked / The Singing Pickle / Swamp Gas"	TBA

=== Season 3 (2005) ===
No. overall	No. in season	Title	Original release date
27	1	"Love the Hair / Say Cheese! / Recycling Blues"	TBA
28	2	"Lightnin' Frightnin' / Classic Rock / And Then There Was Ollie"	TBA
29	3	"Thar's Gold in Them Thar Teeth / All Hail Trogg / Ollie-Baba"	TBA
30	4	"Bad News Scare / Pit Stop / Airport 99"	TBA
31	5	"For Your Eyes Only / This Little Piggie Had None / Election"	TBA
32	6	"All the Ollies / Swallow the Leader / Oh! Gee! Hey!"	TBA
33	7	"Cosmic Cleaner / The Northern Lights Have Seen Strange Sights / General Ollie"	TBA
34	8	"Heavy Pants / Flying Trapeze / Dr. Kildykicks"	TBA
35	9	"The Red Ukulele / Ollie in Blunderland / The Lost Spike"	TBA
36	10	"Mama's Boy / Ollie Ollivia / A Clean Getaway"	TBA
37	11	"Safari Sogoodie / Coral City / Como Say Llama"	TBA
38	12	"Cousin Gord / Citizen Ollie / Nursery Nonsense"	TBA
39	13	"Fashion Scares / Ollie the Barbarian / Trouble"	TBA

== Production ==
The pilot special cost about $500,000 (US$330,000) to produce, and was originally distributed by Cochran Entertainment.

== Telecast and home media ==
Olliver's Adventures originally aired on Teletoon on September 3, 2002 with the first 13 episodes. It consisted of 117 shorts or 39 episodes of 3 shorts each, along with a pilot special. The final episode aired on March 20, 2005. In the U.S., the show formerly aired on Animania HD.

Season 1 of the show used to be on Tubi, but have since become unavailable to watch. The first 6 episodes (18 shorts) also used to be released on Ameba TV, but is now unavailable to watch as well.

== Awards and nominations ==
Year	Association	Category	Nominee	Result	Ref.
2001	Gemini Awards	Best Animated Program or Series	Jessica Andrews, Michael-Andreas Kuttner, Steven J.P. Comeau	Won	
2003	Gemini Awards	Best Animated Program or Series	Allison Outhit, Beth Stevenson, Michael-Andreas Kuttner, Steven J.P. Comeau	Nominated	
2003	Gemini Awards	Best Interactive (www.ollieland.com)	Michael-Andreas Kuttner, Steven J.P. Comeau	Nominated	
