= Bumageddon: The Final Pongflict =

Novel by Andy Griffiths

- First edition
- Author: Andy Griffiths
- Cover artist: Liz Seymour
- Language: English
- Series: Bum trilogy
- Genre: Comedy novel
- Published: 1 September 2005
- Publisher: Pan Macmillan Australia
- Publication place: Australia
- Media type: Print (Paperback)
- Pages: 228 pp
- ISBN: 0-330-42197-2
- OCLC: 224401485
- Preceded by: Zombie Bums from Uranus
- Followed by: What Bumosaur is That?

Bumageddon: The Final Pongflict (retitled Butt Wars: The Final Conflict in the U.S.) is the final book in Andy Griffiths' Bum trilogy, following The Day My Bum Went Psycho and Zombie Bums from Uranus. The book details the events of a young boy called Zack and his adventures to finish the bums once and for all.

== Awards and sales ==
Bumageddon was short-listed for two Australian Children's Choice Awards book awards presented by the Children's Book Council of Australia:

- The Bilby Award (Queensland) for Younger Readers: it did not win, but another of Griffiths' books, Just Crazy! did.
- The KOALA Award (New South Wales) for Older Readers

According to the author's website, Bumageddon was the most popular Australian children's title in 2005, with sales of more than 90,000 in seven months. It also debuted at #9 on the New York Times Best Seller list for Children's Books.

== Footnotes ==
- Children’s Book of the Month. Australian Women’s Weekly. 2005;75(9):308. Accessed July 20, 2025. https://search.ebscohost.com/login.aspx?direct=true&db=f6h&AN=18414198&lang=ru&site=eds-live&scope=site
