= North Star Academy =

North Star Academy may refer to:

== Canada ==
- North Star Academy (Laval, Quebec)

== United States ==
- North Star Academy (Vista, California)
- North Star Academy (Redwood City, California)
- North Star Academy (Parker, Colorado), a charter school in Douglas County, Colorado
- North Star Academy (Marquette, Michigan)
- North Star Academy Charter School of Newark, New Jersey
- Northstar Academy (Richmond, Virginia)
