= Boomerang (Canada) =

Canadian specialty television channel

- Logo used since 2023
- Country: Canada
- Broadcast area: Nationwide
- Headquarters: Toronto, Ontario

Programming
- Language: English
- Picture format: 1080i HDTV (downscaled to letterboxed 480i for the SDTV feed)

Ownership
- Owner: Corus Entertainment (branding licensed from Skydance)
- Parent: Teletoon Canada Inc.
- Sister channels: Cartoon Network; Adult Swim; Télétoon

History
- Launched: July 4, 2012; 14 years ago (as Cartoon Network); March 27, 2023; 3 years ago (as Boomerang)
- Replaced: Teletoon Retro
- Former names: Cartoon Network (2012–2023)

Links
- Website: www.boomerang-tv.ca

Boomerang is a Canadian English language discretionary specialty channel owned by Corus Entertainment. It is a licensed version of the American channel of the same name, which primarily broadcasts animated programming from the Warner Bros. Animation library, including Warner Bros. Cartoons and Hanna-Barbera productions among others, as well as contemporary reboots of classic franchises. The channel also occasionally broadcasts reruns of Cartoon Network original series.

The channel originally launched in 2012 as a Canadian version of Cartoon Network, serving as a sister channel to Teletoon. The service originally operated under a newly issued category B licence. In September 2015, sister network Teletoon Retro was discontinued, and Cartoon Network transitioned to broadcasting under the auspices of that channel's licence instead, inheriting its wider carriage on providers such as Rogers Cable and Shaw.

Cartoon Network previously operated a Canadian version of Adult Swim until 2019, when the block and its Teletoon counterpart Teletoon at Night were spun off as a standalone Adult Swim channel.

In February 2023, Corus announced that the Cartoon Network branding would be moved to Teletoon on March 27, 2023, with the existing Cartoon Network channel relaunching as a Canadian version of Boomerang the same day.

== History ==
=== As Cartoon Network (2012–2023) ===
Logo when the channel was Cartoon Network, used from 2012 to 2023.

YTV as originally intended to be the Canadian distributor of Cartoon Network, applying for a licence at the CRTC in late 1992. The original target was to launch the channel in late 1993 at earliest. The arrival came at a time when US cable networks were beginning to encroach Canadian cable, which, according to YTV's president Kevin Shea, could open new avenues for Canadian producers. Said licence would eventually become Fun TV, which eventually became Teletoon. By that time, Family Channel was interested in obtaining distribution rights to launch its own cartoon channel, using CN's back catalog. The channel was to be known in English as Cartoon Network and in French as Le Réseau Cartoon. Unlike Fun TV, the channel would air limited amounts of Canadian content, as the bulk of Cartoon Network's original output, then as now, was made in the United States.

In November 2011, the CRTC granted a category B licence to Teletoon Canada, Inc. for a new specialty channel tentatively named "Teletoon Kapow!", which would be "devoted to programming from international markets, featuring the latest trends in non-violent action, adventure, superheroes, comedy and interactivity".

In February 2012, Teletoon announced that it would launch a Canadian version of Cartoon Network. The channel would also feature a version of its late-night block Adult Swim. Ahead of the launch, Cartoon Network-branded blocks were added to Teletoon and the now-defunct Teletoon Retro as a preview for the new channel. Cartoon Network launched on July 4, 2012, using the Teletoon Kapow! licence.

On March 4, 2013, Corus Entertainment announced that it would acquire Astral Media's 50% ownership interest in Teletoon Canada Inc., as well as certain other properties, as part of Astral's pending acquisition by Bell Media (which had earlier been rejected by the CRTC in October 2012, but was restructured to allow the sale of certain Astral Media properties in order to allow the purchase to clear regulatory hurdles).

Corus's purchase was cleared by the Competition Bureau two weeks later on March 18. On December 20, 2013, the CRTC approved Corus's full ownership of Teletoon Canada and it was purchased by Corus on January 1, 2014. The channel continues to be owned by Teletoon Canada, now wholly owned by Corus Entertainment under its Corus Kids division.

In August 2015, internal sources at Corus reported that Cartoon Network would be moved to the channel allotments of Teletoon Retro, which was being shut down on September 1, 2015. It was stated that this change would enable the channel to have expanded distribution, as Teletoon Retro was carried by more providers than Cartoon Network, specifically Shaw Cable, Shaw Direct, and Rogers Cable. At that time, Cartoon Network moved under the auspices of the licence that was formerly used by Teletoon Retro; the original Teletoon Kapow! licence was revoked by the CRTC on October 2, 2015. This expanded the channel's carriage to five million households nationwide.

On March 4, 2019, the primetime Adult Swim block was discontinued on the channel, due to the planned re-launch of Action as an Adult Swim-branded channel on April 1.

=== Boomerang (2023–present) ===
On February 21, 2023, Corus announced that Teletoon would rebrand as Cartoon Network on March 27, 2023. The existing Cartoon Network channel concurrently relaunched as a Canadian version of its sister brand Boomerang, which focuses on established franchises from the Cartoon Network and Warner Bros. Animation libraries.

== Programming ==
The channel presently broadcasts animated programming from the Warner Bros. Animation and Cartoon Network Studios libraries, including classic cartoons and Boomerang's original programming. To comply with Canadian content rules, the channel's schedule also includes library programs sourced from its parent network and YTV. The network does not currently originate any original or first-run programs.

During its time as Cartoon Network, the channel's programming was drawn from the library of its American counterpart, in addition to library programs from sister network Teletoon. Generally, first-run airings of Cartoon Network's higher-profile programming remained on Teletoon, with this channel generally airing Cartoon Network programming in second-run form, or launching series expected to have a smaller overall audience outside the United States or airing to merely fulfill contractual requirements.

From its original launch as Cartoon Network through April 2019, the channel also carried a domestic version of the American channel's primetime and late-night block Adult Swim, which carried animated and live-action comedy programs targeting a teen and young adult audience; the block and its Teletoon counterpart Teletoon at Night were spun off into a dedicated Adult Swim channel in 2019.
