= Cartoon Network (Canada) =

Canadian television channel

- Logo used since 2023
- Country: Canada
- Broadcast area: Nationwide
- Headquarters: Toronto, Ontario

Programming
- Language: English
- Picture format: 1080i HDTV (downscaled to 480i letterbox for the SDTV feed)

Ownership
- Owner: Corus Entertainment (branding licensed from Skydance)
- Parent: Teletoon Canada Inc.
- Sister channels: YTV; Treehouse TV; Télétoon; Adult Swim; Boomerang

History
- Launched: October 17, 1997; 29 years ago (as Teletoon); March 27, 2023; 3 years ago (as Cartoon Network)
- Former names: Teletoon (1997–2023)

Links
- Website: cartoonnetwork.ca

Availability

Streaming media
- StackTV: Internet Protocol television

Cartoon Network is a Canadian English-language discretionary specialty channel owned by Corus Entertainment. Operating under a license named after the American cable network of the same name, it primarily broadcasts animated series aimed at children and teenagers.

The channel launched on October 17, 1997 as Teletoon (its name a portmanteau of "television" and "cartoon", stylized in all caps), a bilingual service originally owned by Teletoon Canada, Inc., a consortium of Western International Communications and Astral Media (via their specialty channel Family Channel), Shaw Communications (via its specialty channel YTV), and the animation studios Cinar and Nelvana. With subsequent acquisitions and divestments, Corus became the sole owner of the channel in 2014. The channel aired a mix of domestic productions and imported series, with many of the programs coming from the original Cartoon Network in the United States.

In 2012, Teletoon launched a Canadian version of Cartoon Network as a sister network under license from Turner Broadcasting System. In February 2023, Corus announced that Teletoon would rebrand as Cartoon Network on March 27, 2023, with the previous Cartoon Network channel concurrently relaunching under Cartoon Network's sister brand Boomerang.

Cartoon Network operates two timeshift feeds running on Eastern and Pacific schedules. Along with its French-language counterpart Télétoon, it was available in over 7.3 million households in Canada in November 2013.

== History ==
=== Proposal and preparation (1992–1996) ===
YTV was originally intended to be the Canadian distributor of Cartoon Network, applying for a licence at the Canadian Radio-television and Telecommunications Commission (CRTC) in late 1992. The original target was to launch the channel by 1993. Around this time, American cable networks were beginning to investing on Canadian cable, which, according to YTV's president Kevin Shea, could open avenues for Canadian producers. By early 1994, the planned Cartoon Network distribution licence was replaced by another project, Fun TV. The network was supposed to be owned by Rogers and CUC, owners of YTV, animation studios Nelvana and Cinar and the Toronto-Dominion Bank. The Cartoon Network output would later be given to another proposal owned by Family Channel's operators.

In January 1996, another proposal for the channel was given with 53.3% being owned by the operators of Family Channel, 26,7% by YTV and 10% each by Cinar and Nelvana, who had supported Fun TV. It would spend CA$42 million on Canadian animated productions over a seven-year period. The bid was not comparable to the American Cartoon Network, stating that Turner's channel was attached to Hanna-Barbera's library and was mainly seen as nostalgia, according to Nelvana's chair Michael Hirsh. The channel would include some older cartoons, but would focus on newer titles, with emphasis on international productions. There would also be Japanese animation and adult animated titles, such as Fritz the Cat, at night. Regulations suggested that it would feature programming targeting children from 6am to 6pm (commercial-free 3pm to 6pm), families from 6pm to 10:30pm (including one animated movie during prime time) and a nightly block for adult animation.

On September 3, 1996, Teletoon was one of the 23 licensed channels to be approved by the CRTC, after a related application for a channel to be called "Fun TV" had been denied. The channel was part of the "Gang of Four", referring to the first four of the 23 channels (the other three being CTV News 1, History Television and The Comedy Network) set to launch. These channels quickly negotiated pricing conditions with the cable companies.

=== As Teletoon (1997–2023) ===
The English-language version of Teletoon launched on October 17, 1997. The channel was originally owned by a consortium of other Canadian specialty services, including Family Channel acting as managing partner at 53.3% (Superchannel/WIC and The Movie Network/Astral Media), YTV at 26.7%, (Shaw Communications), along with the Canadian animation studios Cinar and Nelvana with 10% each. Shaw separated its entertainment assets as Corus Entertainment in 1999, which subsequently acquired WIC's stake in Family Channel among other assets as part of its closure later that year, Corus acquired Nelvana in 2000.

Teletoon was licensed as a bilingual service in both English and French, being one of only two Canadian specialty services with such a license; the channel maintains two feeds under the license, with the French feed operating under the branding Télétoon. At the original licensing hearing before the CRTC, the network's operators had stated that the two channels "would be similar in nature and programmed with a similar attitude towards them", but that there would be differences in their programming due to market differences (including Quebec's prohibition on advertising to children) and program rights. Teletoon often commissioned programming to air in both English and French.

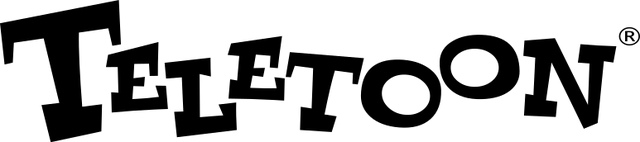
Secondary logo for Teletoon utilized from 2001 until 2007. This wordmark was used in tandem with the previous logo.

As a condition of the license, Teletoon committed to devoting 40% of its programming to Canadian content in its first year of operation, gradually increasing by five per cent yearly to 60% by 2002. Over a similar timeframe, it also committed to similarly have at least half of its programming financed by, and commissioned from third parties unaffiliated with its owners.

In 1998, network management decided to focus on renewals instead of new shows, adopting a more cautious strategy than launching a significant number of new series, as it had in the prior year. By 2001, the channel had invested over $96 million into 98 original productions since its launch; Teletoon's director of original programming Madeleine Levesque stated that "I don't think any other broadcaster has contributed so much, so well, so fast."

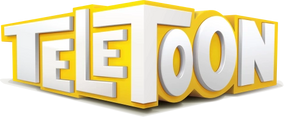
Teletoon's final logo used in Canada from 2007 to 2023; originally rendered flat in 2007, it became a 3D glossy logoform in 2011. However, this logo continues to be used in its French-language counterpart.

On March 4, 2013, Corus Entertainment announced that it would acquire Astral's stake in Teletoon, giving it full ownership. The sale was part of divestitures tied to Astral Media's proposed sale to Bell Media, which had earlier been rejected by the CRTC in October 2012, for competition reasons. Corus's purchase was cleared by the Competition Bureau two weeks later on March 18; the transaction was approved by the CRTC on December 20, 2013, and completed on January 1, 2014. The channel was subsequently brought under the Corus Kids division as part of a reorganization in February 2014, alongside YTV and Nelvana. Teletoon and its sister networks would maintain separate management from YTV.

=== As Cartoon Network (2023–present) ===
On February 21, 2023, Corus announced that Teletoon would be rebranded as Cartoon Network on March 27, 2023; the previous Cartoon Network channel concurrently relaunched under Cartoon Network's sibling brand Boomerang (which is devoted to library programming and classic franchises); the Teletoon brand continues to be used for its companion streaming service Teletoon+ and its French-language feed.

== Programming ==
As Teletoon, the channel's license originally required that 90% of all programs on the channel to be animated. Teletoon previously aired preschool-oriented programming, which was day-parted from 4:00 a.m. to 3:00 p.m. When it launched in 1997, Teletoon had a stated goal of producing 78 half-hours of original content every year, and had continued being active in commissioning programming since then.

Since its inception, the channel has acquired numerous television series from the American-based Cartoon Network and its late night block, Adult Swim. From September 1, 2015, to 2016, original programming from the American channel were moved to its Canadian counterpart. Around the same time, several older programs airing on Teletoon Retro, which closed on September 1, 2015, began airing on Teletoon. Teletoon would also premiere new original programming from Cartoon Network's sister channel, Boomerang.

On April 1, 2019, the channel discontinued its adult programming block Teletoon at Night following the relaunch of Action as a full-time Adult Swim channel.

=== Notable programming blocks ===
- Teletoon Unleashed – Launched in 2001, Teletoon Unleashed was an adult-oriented block of the channel; it aired alongside The Detour on Teletoon until the block merged with it in 2004. It was known for airing every show with an 18+ rating to attract an adult audience, regardless of whether the program actually contained adults-only material or not.
- Teletoon at Night – Launched in September 2002 as The Detour on Teletoon, the block merged with Teletoon Unleashed in 2004. Its French counterpart, Télétoon la nuit, airs on the channel's French-language counterpart. In September 2009, the block was relaunched as Teletoon at Night with an overhaul of its appearance. The block was discontinued on April 1, 2019.
- Teletoon Retro – Teletoon Retro was the branding and block for classic animated programming. It was later spun into a digital channel, which also featured several live-action series. The channel launched on October 1, 2007, and closed on September 1, 2015.
- Can't Miss Thursdays – A block for first-run programming premieres that aired on Thursday nights. The block later featured live-action hosted segments.
- Superfan Fridays – A block showcasing comic book-related and action-oriented animated series.

=== Branding history ===
Initially, Teletoon's programming was divided into dayparted blocks, each featuring a different style of animation. Each blocks were represented as planets:

- Morning Planet for Preschoolers (claymation animation; 5:00 a.m. to 3:00 p.m. EST)
- Afternoon Planet for Kids (2D cel animation; 3:00 p.m.- to 6:00 p.m.)
- Evening Planet for Family (collage animation; 6:00 p.m. to 9:00 p.m. EST)
- Night Planet for Adults (papier-mâché animation; 9:00 p.m. to 5:00 a.m. EST)

The bumpers were made by Cuppa Coffee Studios.

This branding would be discontinued and replaced by a more generic look in mid-August 1998, and begin using the slogan, "It's Unreal!" (or "Imagine!" in the French feed). In 1999, Teletoon was airing bumpers with its first mascot, "Teletina". These bumpers were made by Spin Productions in Toronto.

The channel's on-air appearance was rebranded to a more "cartoony"-style in 2001. The logo was modified slightly and came in different coloured border variations, and in addition, an alternate logo was introduced, consisting of a wordmark of the channel's name in a custom font. This wordmark would serve as the channel's secondary logo for its programming blocks and certain graphic presentations, while the original logo would be the primary logo for its corporate material and overall brand representation. Several more bumpers using CGI animation made by Guru Studio subsequently premiered on the channel during this period.

Another rebrand for the channel was released, with the original logo discontinued (and fully utilizing the wordmark), for a partial rebranding made by the Montreal-based Buzz Image Group on August 29, 2005. Despite this, the original logo continued to be used in some form until 2007, most notably as a production logo and on their website.

On February 5, 2007, the channel's wordmark was removed and the original logo was officially replaced as part of a major rebrand. Teletoon's website and its on-air appearance were dramatically changed, and the overall aesthetic of both the channel and its bumpers became modernized.

On September 5, 2011, to reflect the channel's transition to digital television, the logo was refined and changed to a more three-dimensional appearance, designed by New York-based design agency Trollbäck & Company.

== Related services ==
On November 24, 2000, the Canadian Radio-television and Telecommunications Commission (CRTC) approved multiple applications from Teletoon Canada Inc. to launch six Category 2 television channels named Teletoon Action, Teletoon Adult, Teletoon Art, Teletoon Multi, Teletoon Pop and Teletoon Retro. None of the channels launched and their broadcast licenses expired on November 24, 2004. The Teletoon Retro concept would later be revived under a different license.

=== Current ===
==== Télétoon ====
Télétoon is the French-language counterpart which broadcasts most of the shows from Cartoon Network in French.

==== Boomerang ====
On November 4, 2011, the Canadian Radio-television and Telecommunications Commission (CRTC) approved an application from Teletoon to launch Teletoon Kapow!, a Category B digital cable and satellite channel devoted to international programming containing "non-violent action, adventure, superheroes, comedy and interactivity." On February 2, 2012, Teletoon announced that it would launch a local Cartoon Network channel in Canada. It launched using the Teletoon Kapow! license on July 4, 2012.

On September 1, 2015, the channel started operating under the broadcast license originally granted for Teletoon Retro. The previous license for the channel intended for Teletoon Kapow! was revoked on October 2, 2015.

Concurrent with the rebranding of Teletoon itself as Cartoon Network, the original Cartoon Network channel was relaunched as a Canadian version of Boomerang.

==== Teletoon+ ====
Teletoon+ is a subscription video on demand service which launched September 1, 2022, on Amazon Prime Video Channels, replacing Corus's previous Nick+ service (which was a streaming counterpart to its Nickelodeon channel). The service features exclusive content acquired from Cartoon Network and Warner Bros. Animation.

=== Former ===
==== Teletoon Retro ====
Teletoon Retro was a Category B digital cable and satellite channel that launched in fall 2007, and was named after a program block that featured classic animated series. Programming shown on the channel included The Tom & Jerry Show, The Bugs Bunny & Tweety Show, Scooby-Doo, The Flintstones, The Raccoons, The Jetsons, The Pink Panther, Fat Albert and the Cosby Kids, Inspector Gadget, and Gumby.

The channel was discontinued on September 1, 2015, and was replaced by either Disney Channel (on Bell Aliant, Bell Satellite TV, EastLink, Telus Optik TV, VMedia, Vidéotron, MTS, Bell Fibe TV, NorthernTel, Novus, and Zazeen), or Cartoon Network (on Shaw Direct/Shaw Cable, Rogers Cable, SaskTel and many independent providers) on several aforementioned providers. Following Teletoon Retro's closure, the channel would air classic programming during non-peak viewing hours.
