= Andy Griffiths bibliography =

This is a list of all published works by Australian children's author Andy Griffiths.

== Short story collections ==
=== Just Tricking! ===
Alternative Titles: Just Joking! and Just Kidding!

Released: 1997

This book begins by asking to take the "Tricking Test" to find out if the book is suitable, scoring one point for each 'yes' answer. Humorously, whether you scored 0 or 5, it says you will love this book.

=== Just Annoying! ===
Released: 1998

A Publishers Weekly review stated that "Denton's scribbled pen illustrations fill up the margins on every page, with jokes, bizarre flip book animations and other absurdities".

=== Just Stupid! ===
Released: 1999

Just Stupid! contains various silly short stories about things such as repairing snail shells, riding baby prams, and nonsensical dreams. The book received a BILBY Award in the Younger Readers category in 2000.

=== Just Crazy! ===
Alternative Title: Just Wacky!

Released: 2000

Similar to the first title in the series, Just Tricking!, this book asks readers to take the "Crazy Test", asking questions like, "do you look in the mirror and see a crazy maniac staring back at you?" and "do you sometimes get the urge to take your clothes off and cover yourself in mud?"

=== Just Three for Free! ===
Released: 2000

This book contains three stories: Playing Dead, In The Shower With Andy, and Runaway Pram.

=== Just Disgusting! ===
Released: 2002

The test for this book asks if readers pick their nose, wear the same undies two days in a row and wee in swimming pools, among other disgusting things.

=== Just Shocking! ===
Released: 2007

Following a short break in releases in the series, this book asks if "you wish you could drive around in a monster truck crushing everybody and everything that gets in your way" and if watching videos of people getting involved in accidents is funny.

=== Just Macbeth! ===
Released: 2009

Bell Shakespeare commissioned Griffiths in 2005 to adapt Macbeth by William Shakespeare to a younger audience and this book was the result. Bell Shakespeare then produced it for the stage in various performances across Australia.

=== Just Doomed! ===
Released: 2012

The "Doomed Test" asks if you have ever broken a mirror, walked under a ladder or opened an umbrella inside, among other superstitious things.

=== Bad book series ===
- The Bad Book (2004)
- The Very Bad Book (2010)

== Novels ==
=== "Treehouse" series ===
- The 13-Storey Treehouse (1 Sep 2011)
- The 26-Storey Treehouse (1 Sep 2012)
- The 39-Storey Treehouse (1 Sep 2013)
- The 52-Storey Treehouse (1 Sep 2014)
- The 65-Storey Treehouse (12 Aug 2015)
- The 78-Storey Treehouse (9 Aug 2016)
- The 91-Storey Treehouse (8 Aug 2017)
- The 104-Storey Treehouse (10 Jul 2018)
- The 117-Storey Treehouse (23 Jul 2019)
- The 130-Storey Treehouse (6 Apr 2021)
- The 143-Storey Treehouse (5 Apr 2022)

==== "Treehouse" spin-offs ====
- The Treehouse Fun Book (activity book) (22 Mar 2016)
- The Treehouse Fun Book 2 (activity book) (28 Mar 2017)
- The Treehouse Fun Book 3 (activity book) (27 Mar 2018)
- Terry's Dumb Dot Story: A Treehouse Tale (World Book Day (UK and Ireland) 2018 special) (27 Feb 2018)
- The Treehouse Joke Book (24 Sep 2019)

=== "Bum" series ===
- The Day My Bum Went Psycho (2001), published in the US as The Day My Butt Went Psycho
- Zombie Bums from Uranus (2003), published in the US as Zombie Butts From Uranus
- Bumageddon: The Final Pongflict (2005) published in the US as Butt Wars: The Final Conflict

=== "A&T's World of Stupidity" series ===
- What Bumosaur is That? (2007), published in the US as What Buttosaur is That?
- What Body Part is That? (2011)

=== "Schooling Around" series ===
- Treasure Fever! (2008)
- Pencil of Doom! (2008)
- Mascot Madness! (2008)
- Robot Riot! (2009)

=== "YOU & ME" series ===
- YOU & ME and The Land of Lost Things (2024))
- YOU & ME and The Peanut Butter Beast (2025)

=== Picture books ===
- Stinky Stories, illustrated by Jeff Raglus
- Fast Food and No Play Make Jack a Fat Boy (2006)
- The Cat on the Mat Is Flat (2006)
- The Big Fat Cow That Goes KAPOW! (2008)
- The Naked Boy and the Crocodile (2011)
- Andypedia (2012)
- Once Upon a Slime (2013)
- The Cat, the Rat, and the Baseball Bat (2013)
- Ed and Ted and Ted’s Dog Fred (2014)
