= COOL Award =

Book award in Canberra, Australia

The COOL Awards is an annual children's choice award voted on by students in Canberra, the Australian Capital Territory, Australia. Children are encouraged to read and vote for their favourite books. The votes are tallied and the awards made.

The COOL Award name is an acronym, standing for Canberra’s Own Outstanding List.

The ACT Public Library currently convenes the awards and they are administered by a committee representing ACT Government, Catholic and Independent Schools, the ACT Public Library and the Children's Book Council of Australia, ACT Branch. The award was first made in 1991.

== Award categories and descriptions ==
There are four categories of the COOL awards:

- for most popular Picture Book
- for most popular Fiction for Younger Readers
- for most popular Fiction for Older Readers
- for most popular Fiction for Years 7–9 (commenced in 2007)

== List of COOL Award winners ==
=== Picture Book Award ===
Year	Author	Book	Citation
1993	Jeannie Baker	Window	Winner
1994	Mem Fox	Possum Magic	Winner
1995	Margaret Wild	Toby	Winner
1996	Jessica Carroll	Billy the Punk	Winner
1997	Jessica Carroll	Billy the Punk	Winner
1998	Margaret Wild	The Midnight Gang	Winner
1999	Rod Clement	Grandad’s Teeth	Winner
2000	David Legge	Bamboozled	Winner
2003	Jackie French	Diary of a Wombat	Winner
2004	Pamela Allen	Mr McGee and the Biting Flea	Winner
2005	Stephen Michael King	Mutt Dog!	Winner
2006	Matt Dray	Dougal the Garbage Dump Bear	Winner
2007	Deborah Niland	Annie's Chair	Winner
2008	Mem Fox, illus by Judy Horacek	Where is the Green Sheep?	Winner
2009	Graeme Base	Jungle Drums	Winner
2010	Colin Thompson	Fearless	Winner
2011	Leigh Hobbs	Mr Chicken Goes to Paris	Winner
2012	Ursula Dubosarsky, illus by Andrew Joyner	The Terrible Plop	Winner
2013	Jeannie Baker	Mirror	Joint Winners
2013	Nick Bland	The Very Cranky Bear	Joint Winners
2014	Bob Graham	A Bus Called Heaven	Winner

=== Fiction for Younger Readers Award ===
Year	Author	Book	Citation
1991	Paul Jennings	Round the Twist	Winner
1992	Paul Jennings	The Cabbage Patch Fib	Winner
1993	Paul Jennings	Unreal!	Winner
1994	Graeme Base	The Eleventh Hour	Winner
1995	Paul Jennings	The Gizmo	Winner
1996	Morris Gleitzman	Belly Flop	Winner
1997	Morris Gleitzman	Belly Flop	Winner
1998	Paul Jennings	Wicked	Winner
1999	Morris Gleitzman	Bumface	Winner
2000	Emily Rodda	Bob the Builder and the Elves	Winner
2003	Emily Rodda	Deltora Quest 2 series	Winner
2004	Emily Rodda	Deltora Quest 3 series	Winner
2006	Anna Fienberg	Tashi and the Forbidden Room	Winner
2007	Andy Griffiths	The Cat on the Mat is Flat	Winner
2008	Andy Griffiths	Just Shocking!	Winner
2009	Kathy Castle	Go Girl! Two Sides: #1 Track Stars!	Winner
2010	Andy Griffiths	The Big Fat Cow Goes Kapow	Winner
2011	Andy Griffiths	The Very Bad Book	Winner
2012	Anna Fienberg, Barbara Fienberg and Kim Gamble	Tashi and the Golem	Winner
2013	Morris Gleitzman	Pizza Cake	Winner
2014	Felice Arena	Andy Roid and the Tracks of Death	Winner

=== Fiction for Older Readers Award ===
Year	Author	Book	Citation
1991	Robin Klein	People Might Hear You	Winner
1992	Robin Klein	Came Back to Show You I Could Fly	Winner
1993	Victor Kelleher	Del-Del	Winner
1994	Ruth Park	Playing Beatie Bow	Winner
1995	John Marsden	Tomorrow, When the War Began and So Much to Tell You (tied)	Winner
1996	Paul Jennings	Paw Thing	Winner
1997	Paul Jennings	Paw Thing	Winner
1998	John Marsden	The Dead of the Night	Winner
1999	John Marsden	The Third Day, the Frost	Winner
2000	John Marsden	The Night is for Hunting	Winner
2003	Andy Griffiths	Just Disgusting!	Winner
2004	Andy Griffiths	Zombie Bums from Uranus	Winner
2005	Andy Griffiths	The Bad Book	Winner
2006	Andy Griffiths	Bumageddon: The Final Pongflict	Winner
2007	Andy Griffiths	Zombie Bums from Uranus	Winner
2008	Paul Jennings	Spookiest Stories	Winner
2009	Morris Gleitzman	Give Peas a Chance	Winner
2010	Emily Rodda	The Battle of Rondo	Winner
2011	John Flanagan	Ranger's Apprentice	Winner
2012	Andy Griffiths, illus by Terry Denton	The 13-Storey Treehouse	Winner
2013	Andy Griffiths, illus by Terry Denton	The 26-Storey Treehouse	Winner
2014	Andy Griffiths, illus by Terry Denton	The 39-Storey Treehouse	Winner

=== Fiction for Years 7-9 Award ===
Year	Author	Book	Citation
2007	Sonya Hartnett	The Silver Donkey	Winner
2008	Carole Wilkinson	Dragon Moon	Winner
2009	Emily Rodda	The Wizard of Rondo	Winner
2010	Morris Gleitzman	Boy Overboard	Winner
2011	Morris Gleitzman	Now	Winner
2012	Chris Morphew	The Phoenix Files: Arrival	Winner
2013	Morris Gleitzman	After	Winner
2014	James Phelan	13: The Last Thirteen	Winner

== See also ==
- List of Australian literary awards
- List of CBCA Awards
