= List of What's with Andy? episodes =

What's with Andy? is an animated series that aired from 2001 to 2007. The series was produced by CinéGroupe, and aired on Teletoon. It was based on the Just! series of books written by Andy Griffiths and illustrated by Terry Denton.

The seasons 1 and 2 episode order below follows that of the DVD releases in Europe, which also closely matches the original airdates on Teletoon in Canada.

== Series overview ==
Season	Episodes		Originally released	
Season	Episodes		First released	Last released
1	26	Canada	June 30, 2001	April 7, 2002
1	26	U.S.	September 22, 2001	July 21, 2002
2	26		September 3, 2003	April 11, 2004
3	26		September 3, 2006	March 4, 2007

== Episodes ==
=== Season 1 (2001–02) ===
No. overall	No. in series	Title	Written by	Original release date	U.S. air date	Prod. code
1	1	"Just Stuffing"	David Freedman and Alan Gilbey	June 30, 2001	September 26, 2001	101
Andy begins copying Jen's every move, going so far as to attend a school dance in a dress and wig.
2	2	"Gooey Chewies"	Robert Lamoreaux	August 26, 2001	September 27, 2001	102
Andy plans pranks for April Fools Day, but then gets invited to Lori's birthday / H.A.P.P.Y. initiation party. She won't take no for an answer. He finally gets a chance to kiss Lori but then loses it because of a bet with Danny, where they decided to see who could stuff the most gooey chewies into their mouth.
3	3	"Beat the Bomb"	Ford Riley	July 1, 2001	September 28, 2001	103
Andy and Danny prank call several people claiming to be the local DJ in charge of the "Beat the Bomb" contest. One of the people they prank, Martin, takes it seriously and thinks that he actually won $512. In order to avoid embarrassing him they have to raise $512. The method they use: they claim that "Bumpo the Monkey Dance Dancing Monkey" is sick. Andy has to dress up as Bumpo and act sick.
4	4	"Rhyme Time"	Tom Sheppard	September 30, 2001	July 10, 2002	104
In order to get his sister Jen to shut up for a week, Andy has agreed to rhyme every word in every phrase for a week. He then uses this to his advantage to get a part in the play with Lori.
5	5	"Food Fight"	Michelle Lamoreaux	September 2, 2001	September 25, 2001	105
Andy and Danny sneak into a movie premiere party in order to meet their favorite actress.
6a	6a	"101 Underpants"	Kat Likkel	September 23, 2001	September 23, 2001	106a
When Andy loses his pants in front of the whole school, he decides to "pants" the whole school. Note: Unlike other episodes of the series, five half-hour episodes have been split into two 11-minute segments. This episode is the first of the ten 11-minute segments of the show.
6b	6b	"Playing Dead"	Alan Smith	September 23, 2001	September 23, 2001	106b
Mrs. Larkin has signed Andy up for the dunking tank without him knowing. In order to get out of getting dunked and getting grounded, Andy plays dead. Doing this almost gets him buried alive.
7	7	"The Show Must Go On"	Steven Banks	September 16, 2001	September 22, 2001	107
When Andy hears that superintendent is coming for a visit, he tries to get sent home. But, unfortunately, he gets sent to Kindergarten instead.
8a	8a	"Emergency Spew Relish"	Alan Smith	September 9, 2001	October 1, 2001	108a
Andy tries to evacuate a whole train car by stinking everyone out. That fails so he has to resort to other means including pretending to vomit with the aid of corn relish.
8b	8b	"Busting"	Joe Purdy	September 9, 2001	October 1, 2001	108b
In order to get out of having to buy food for Lik and Leech, he decides to "test their endurance" through a drinking contest. Andy has too much to drink and has to find a toilet.
9a	9a	"Very Bad Idea"	Kat Likkel	October 7, 2001	September 29, 2001	109a
At the school science fair, Andy steals a weather balloon for a joy ride.
9b	9b	"Cockroaches"	Joe Purdy	October 7, 2001	September 29, 2001	109b
At Mr. Larkin's boss' house Andy is not supposed to pull any pranks. While there Andy finds cockroaches in his salad. They get into his clothes, so he goes to the bathroom and strips down. Then his clothes go flying out the bathroom window.
10	10	"It Came from East Gackle"	Michael Maler and William Culverius	October 14, 2001	September 30, 2001	110
Andy tricks everyone into believing that aliens have come to East Gackle, and that they will make an appearance. Andy has to prove that it isn't a hoax.
11	11	"Campaign in the Butt"	Michael Hamill	October 21, 2001	October 6, 2001	111
Andy's sister Jen is running for a position as school president. Andy doesn't want her to win so he convinces someone that Jen has the hots for, Craig, to run against her knowing that she would not have a chance against the most popular guy at school. He then gets tired helping Craig out and decides to run for a position himself.
12a	12a	"Road Trip"	Anne-Marie Perrotta and Tean Schultz	February 17, 2002	October 10, 2001	112a
The Larkins decide to go to the carnival, but on the way Andy annoys them, so they turn around and leave him at home. He is determined to go to the carnival no matter what it takes. He gets there and surprises his family in the middle of getting their picture taken.
12b	12b	"Snow Job"	Anne-Marie Perrotta and Tean Schultz	February 17, 2002	October 10, 2001	112b
In order to get out of taking an exam and going to school, Andy with the help of his friend Danny and pizza delivery man Mush, trick Principal DeRosa into thinking that a blizzard has hit the town overnight.
13	13	"Best Enemies"	Robin Riordian	October 28, 2001	October 16, 2001	113
As a revenge on them for bullying Lori, Andy tries to get two of the school's bullies, Lik and Leech, to dislike each other. Andy first steals Leech's hat, "Nubby", and plants it in Lik's locker. To keep this prank going, Andy must now convince Leech that he is tricking Lik, and Lik, that he is tricking Leech. At the same time, Danny is getting Andy's plus his worth of picking on. Andy must decide between pranking Lik and Leech, and friendship.
14	14	"Mascot"	Joe Purdy	January 13, 2002	October 11, 2001	114
East Gackle high finally has a new mascot. It's time to say bye to Mr. Groovy and hello to "Slick" the Penguin. Andy sabotages the mascot and releases "tuxes" (penguins) at the unveiling. This causes a media stir and Andy has his prank shown on television.
15a	15a	"Little Foot"	Anne-Marie Perrotta and Tean Schultz	January 20, 2002	October 19, 2001	115a
Andy, with the help of his friend Danny, trick everyone in the town into thinking that there is an actual "Little Foot" monster, and that this monster is actually stealing everyone's socks.
15b	15b	"Grandpa Crazy"	Anne-Marie Perrotta and Tean Schultz	January 20, 2002	October 19, 2001	115b
Grandpa Larkin is in town, and Grandpa wants Andy to look after him. Lots of strange things happen around the house and the family blames Andy. Note: This episode is the last of the ten 11-minute segments of the show. After this, every episode of the series is the usual one full-length story format.
16	16	"Gnome for the Holidays"	Gabriel Lewis and David Nadelberg	January 27, 2002	October 26, 2001	116
Being the only one out of four people in town on summer holidays, Andy uses gnomes to practice pranks on.
17	17	"The Royal Secret Society of Zombies"	Rick Groel	October 27, 2001	October 27, 2001	117
When an organization out-pranks Andy and Danny, they make the town think that the members of that organization are zombies.
18	18	"Merry Chaos"	William Culverius	December 15, 2001	December 1, 2001	118
When Andy's design for a Christmas float is stolen by Lik and Leech, he decides to disrupt the parade.
19	19	"Very Scary Stuff"	Anne-Marie Perrotta and Tean Schultz	February 10, 2002	November 9, 2001	119
When Jen claims that she can't be scared, Andy uses gags from the "Mitch" movie series to scare her.
20	20	"The Answers"	Joe Purdy	February 24, 2002	December 8, 2001	120
Andy tricks Lik and Leech into thinking that Craig has the answers to the big standardized test, and he tricks Craig into thinking that Martin has the answers. Eventually he confuses them all, and at the end, they find out that it was him.
21	21	"Wag the Kid"	Tom Sheppard	March 3, 2002	July 21, 2002	121
For career week, Andy becomes the Mayor of East Gackle.
22	22	"Bring It Off"	Anne-Marie Perrotta and Tean Schultz	March 10, 2002	January 5, 2002	122
Andy decides to challenge his sister Jen in a cheerleading contest. Andy and Danny come up with a good routine, then dress up like penguins. Time comes around for the contest to end, and Andy and Danny do the routine they stole from Jen.
23	23	"Pranks a Lot"	Bryan Thompson	March 17, 2002	January 12, 2002	123
Jen challenges Andy to pull a prank on everyone that talks to him on that day.
24	24	"Un-Masked Marauders"	Alan Smith	March 24, 2002	January 19, 2002	124
When a prank goes wrong, Andy and Danny have to disguise themselves as pro wrestlers, and they will have to fight a visiting celebrity team.
25	25	"The Great American Lock-In"	David Slack	March 31, 2002	February 19, 2002	125
Andy reverses the school doors so that when someone comes in, they're locked in. He then gets Lik and Leech to chase him into the school, locking them in. But, Andy remembers that he dropped the spare keys while running, so he and Danny are locked in as well.
26	26	"Teen Dreamboats"	Matthew Cope	April 7, 2002	February 2, 2002	126
Andy, Danny, and Mush make up a band for the East Gackle Dill Pickle Festival.

=== Season 2 (2003–04) ===
No. in series	No. in season	Title	Written by	Storyboarded by	Original air date (Teletoon)	Prod. code
27	1	"What's with Jean-Thomas?"	Jon Minnis	Daniel Miodini	September 10, 2003	201
Everyone in East Gackle is mad at Andy because of "The Prank", including Lori who had finally agreed to go out with Andy. To get Lori to talk with him, Andy poses as Jean-Thomas, Andy's long lost twin from Montreal. Will Andy finally get a date with Lori?
28	2	"The Fortunate One"	Anne-Marie Perrotta and Tean Schultz	Jean Lajeunesse and Sylvain Lavoie	September 3, 2003	202
Andy creates a bogus astrology column for the school newspaper to test how gullible his fellow students are. Unfortunately for Jen, Andy focuses most of his cosmic energy on her when she consults the stars as to what her act should be for the school's variety show auditions.
29	3	"The Musical Fruit"	Anne-Marie Perrotta and Tean Schultz	Nick Vallinakis and Ventzeslav Vesselinov	September 17, 2003	203
Jen sets up a charity luncheon with all proceeds going to needy Inuit kids. As usual something goes wrong and although it wasn't entirely Andy's fault he gets caught and tagged with the blame. Is he finally going to get suspended? Meanwhile, the school janitor, Clyde, and librarian, Ms. Scorn, have a crush on each other and Andy decides to keep them together.
30	4	"Weight to Go, Andy!"	Jon Minnis	Tom Nesbitt and Jean Lajeunesse	September 24, 2003	204
Jen's obsession with her appearance is fuel for Andy's pranking fire. With a little adjustment to the bathroom scale, he soon has her believing that she has more chins than the Chinese Yellow pages. Unfortunately, he doesn't plan on Mom and Dad's vanity and that can only mean a ton of trouble.
31	5	"The Toilet Paper Fiasco"	Anne-Marie Perrotta and Tean Schultz	Ventzeslav Vesselinov and Sylvain Lavoie	October 1, 2003	205
Andy's plan to toilet paper East Gackle with the World's largest toilet roll coincides with Mom's attempt to win a spot in the "Top Ten Canadian Towns" competition. Toilet paper, smoilet paper-when Mom gets her hands on Andy, she'll wipe that grin off his face!
32	6	"Prankster to the Core"	Anne-Marie Perrotta and Tean Schultz	Jean Banville and Denis Doucet	October 8, 2003	206
Andy's visit to "The Big Apple", the World's most boring amusement park, only serves to get his pranking juices flowing. Who stands in his way? Gisele, the wily old proprietor who intends to "pip" him at the post at every turn.
33	7	"Fore!"	Nisha Muire	Michael Cassey and James Caswell	October 15, 2003	207
When Andy jeopardizes Jervis' political aspirations by replacing him as Mayor Roth's golf caddy, Jervis is "green" with envy and vows to get Andy into a "hole" lot of trouble. Can he do it, or will he just be "putter" in Andy's hands?
34	8	"Prank & Field Day"	Anne-Marie Perrotta and Tean Schultz	Karine Charlebois and Christopher Goodkey	October 22, 2003	208
Motivated by jealousy and revenge, Andy plans to win Lori's heart by winning the school field event over Craig and Jervis. All's fair in love and war, but nobody said anything about sports.
35	9	"Mind Games"	Matthew Cope	Zoran Vanjaka and Jean-Philippe Morin	October 29, 2003	209
Because of his obsessive pranking, Andy is sent to be analyzed and ends up in a battle of wills with the school counselor, Mrs. Murphy. He also learns from her about existence of Mystery Prankster of East Gackle, who, like Andy, also used to be a great prankster.
36	10	"Nurse Jen"	Thomas LaPierre	Tom Nesbitt and Sylvain Lavoie	November 5, 2003	210
Jen is forced to nurse Andy when she is led to believe that she is responsible for his injured ankle. Being confined to bed, Andy plans to get his unwitting sister to execute his latest prank and let her get all the blame. What a sick idea! Note: This episode is dedicated to actress Jaclyn Linetsky, the voice of Lori Mackney who died in a car accident in September 2003 at the age of seventeen.
37	11	"Don't Eat the Yellow Snow"	Jacques E. Bouchard	Michael Cassey and James Caswell	November 12, 2003	211
When pools of yellow liquid appear near the canine ice sculptures at the East Gackle Winter Carnival, two things are for sure. Ice dogs don't pee and Andy Larkin is somehow involved. But with all that extra security in place, how did he do it? It's enough to make Mrs. Weebles barking mad!
38	12	"Andysaurus Rex"	Gerard Lewis	Kevin Currie and Denis Doucet	November 19, 2003	212
Andy needs to get back into Lori's good books, and the field trip to the archaeological dig the next day provides the perfect setting. It's time for Andy to make a dinosaur-sized impression. Can he do it or will he end up looking like a Neanderthal?
39	13	"Molasses"	Anne-Marie Perrotta and Tean Schultz	Karine Charlebois and Jean Banville	November 26, 2003	213
A televised dance competition live from East Gackle high? It's too much for Andy to pass up, even though everyone from Jen to Principal DeRosa plan to keep him away. If he's to pull off the prank of the year, he's going to need some pretty fast footwork.
40	14	"A Match Made in East Gackle"	Michael F. Hamill	Charles Vaucelle	December 31, 2003	214
Seems like someone out in cyber space has the hots for Lik and Leech, considering they're getting lovey dovey e-mails from secret admirers? Meanwhile, Jen gets grounded and makes a bet with Andy: If she'll leave the house before the end of her grounding, Andy will have to clean her laundry over a month, much to his chagrin.
41	15	"Lights... Camera... Ooops!"	Heidi Foss	Ivan Bonometti	January 7, 2004	215
With his documentary featuring a cunning prank, Martin Bonwick and what the two have in common, Andy plans to win a major award at the up-coming film festival. Of course, it would be an honour just to be nominated.
42	16	"New Kid on the Chopping Block"	Nisha Muire	Bruno Isslay	January 21, 2004	216
There's a new prankster in town, Brian, who's getting all of Lori's attention! But Andy soon turns the tables against him.
43	17	"Stone Cold"	Jacques E. Bouchard	Ivan Bonometti	February 20, 2004	217
Yes, parent/child day down at the local curling rink is pretty boring and Andy and Jen will do just about anything to get out of it. Andy's remote controlled stone is just the ticket to disaster!
44	18	"Food for Thought"	Matthew Cope	Augusto Zanovello	January 14, 2004	218
It's the Canadians against the French in the Foosball final, and Andy is ready to stir up passions between Frank Burger and Messieur Roquefort, two local restaurant owners and foosball fanatics. It's enough to bring a whole new meaning to the expression, "fast food".
45	19	"The Buck Stops Here"	Gerard Lewis	Charles Vaucelle	February 4, 2004	219
If Andy wins this year's East Gackle Stampede, he gets to lock lips with Lori, the Junior Rodeo Queen. However, Andy and the horses have a hard time getting along. Andy decides to eliminate the competition. However, the other competitors are Lik, Leech, and Leech's dad.
46	20	"Life Is a Lottery, Old Chum"	Jon Minnis	Sylvain Girault	March 15, 2004	220
Andy notices that his parents seem happy when they think about winning the lottery, so he makes it seem like they won. Unfortunately, things get out of hand when Jen buys a convertible to show off to Craig, Mr. Larkin decides to tell off his boss, and Mrs. Larkin decides to donate $100,000 to a charity, and buys many things, including a vacation cruise. Andy now has to stop his family from making a horrible mistake.
47	21	"Bluebeard's Crate"	Heidi Foss	Augusto Zanovello	February 18, 2004	221
Andy finds out about a prank contest in his prank magazine (Prankster Weekly), in which you have to use nothing! Andy sets up his prank, a gigantic box, in which has nothing inside it. When the prank magazine guys appear, Andy finds that his box is filled with junk, but who did it?
48	22	"Spanky Pranky Hanky Panky"	Jon Minnis	Ivan Bonometti	January 28, 2004	222
Using his dog, Spank, as a prop, Andy sets about pranking the neighbourhood. Things go "howlingly" well until Dad's boss's wife claims Spank for her own. Andy has no choice but to "doggedly" try to retrieve him, but it's more easily said than done "dogarn it!".
49	23	"Daddy Dearest"	Anne-Marie Perrotta and Tean Schultz	Bruno Isslay	March 18, 2004	223
Andy has no fear of being punished for his pranking as long as Constable Steve Jr. is in charge. But when Steve Sr. takes over – watch out. An old, bitter Mounty always gets his man!
50	24	"The Party"	Anne-Marie Perrotta and Tean Schultz	Stéphane Roux	March 17, 2004	224
In order to snare Lori, Jervis is throwing a party and Andy's not invited. What's a pranker to do? You guessed it... infiltrate and destroy! It's a sure bet Andy isn't going to grant Jervis any party favours.
51	25	"All Dressed to Go"	Thomas LaPierre	Karine Charlebois and Zoran Vanjaka	February 25, 2004	225
When Mush asks for Andy's help to deliver pizzas, Andy promises not to pull any pranks. But the inevitable happens, jeopardizing Mush's job. Would Andy sell out his friend for a "cheesy" prank, or is someone else "hamming" it up at his expense?
52	26	"Mr. E.G. Goes to Moosehoof"	Matthew Cope	Augusto Zanovello	April 11, 2004	226
Andy gets into a pranking war with Suzy, his female counterpart from the neighbouring town. It isn't long before he's holding that town's stuffed mascot, the "Moosehoof Moose", hostage. But is it the real moose, or has Suzy beat Andy at his own "game"?

=== Season 3 (2006–07) ===
No. in series	No. in season	Title	Written by	Storyboarded by	Original air date (Teletoon)	Prod. code
53	1	"Romancing the Prank"	Anne-Marie Perrotta and Tean Schultz	Jean Lajeunesse and Daniel DeCelles	September 3, 2006	301
Danny pretends that he is the prankster genius in order to win the love of a girl.
54	2	"Andy Pranky Pudding and Pie"	Anne-Marie Perrotta and Tean Schultz	Daniel Miodini and Sylvie Lafrance	September 10, 2006	302
Andy makes sure Jen's babysitting job is pranktastic!
55	3	"Heart of Prankness"	Anne-Marie Perrotta and Tean Schultz	Marc Dubois and Patrick Cunningham	September 17, 2006	303
Andy's grandfather has given up pranking and Andy decides to snap him back into pranking sense.
56	4	"Don't Shoot the Messenger"	Jon Minnis	Elie Klimos and Christopher Goodkey	September 24, 2006	304
Andy practices the art of subliminal messaging on Jen who ends up pulling pranks around town.
57	5	"Scary Teri"	Anne-Marie Perrotta and Tean Schultz	Daniel DeCelles and Jean Lajeunesse	October 22, 2006	305
Andy convinces Teri that she has the power to move things with her mind and now everyone in school thinks that Teri is "Scary".
58	6	"Hapless Anniversary"	Gerard Lewis	Daniel Miodini and Sylvie Lafrance	October 1, 2006	306
Jen is throwing her parents an anniversary party and will do anything to make sure that Andy doesn't spoil it, in order to get a car.
59	7	"To Kill a Caribou"	Thomas LaPierre	Pat Cunningham, Hélène Cossette, and Tapani Knuutila	October 8, 2006	307
Andy and Danny paint the ceremonial caribou in some trippy colours, but it drops dead and they have to find a replacement ASAP.
60	8	"Pranks Are in the Air"	Nisha Muire	Elie Klimos and Christopher Goodkey	October 15, 2006	308
Andy dishes out fake love advice on a radio station's love contest, causing the town's gullible men to act like fools.
61	9	"I Fall to Pieces"	Matthew Cope	Jean Lajeunesse and Daniel DeCelles	November 1, 2006	309
Andy breaks his mother's antique teapot and has to get it fixed before she appears on the traveling antiques TV show.
62	10	"She Pranks Me, She Pranks Me Not"	Jon Minnis	Sylvie Lafrance and Daniel Miodini	November 5, 2006	310
Andy gives Lori the cold shoulder and now she thinks that he's simply irresistible.
63	11	"Prank-a-razzi"	Anne-Marie Perrotta and Tean Schultz	Gregory Woronchak and Marc Dubois	November 12, 2006	311
Andy's prank on cable TV turns him into a pranking superstar.
64	12	"On the Farm"	Katherine Sandford	Daniel DeCelles and Gregory Woronchak	November 19, 2006	312
Andy finally gets sent to the farm for some hard, prank-free labour only to find a porker of a prank.
65	13	"The Exchange Student"	Gerard Lewis	Hélène Cossette and Tapani Knuutila	November 26, 2006	313
The Larkin family takes in a Latvian exchange student and nearly causes an international incident.
66	14	"Daddy! (Dad for a Week)"	Thomas LaPierre	Elie Klimos and Christopher Goodkey	December 3, 2006	314
Andy and Jervis are paired up in class to take care of an automated baby for a week.
67	15	"Scooped"	Nisha Muire	Karine Charlebois and Daniel Miodini	December 10, 2006	315
Lori has to write an exposé on "Andy Larkin, Prankster" for the local paper.
68	16	"The Boy Who Cried Woof"	Jon Minnis	Daniel DeCelles and Sylvie Lafrance	January 3, 2007	316
Andy switches his stunt-phobic Spank for a stunt-defying, movie-star pooch due to some betting action but everything goes wrong.
69	17	"A Ghost of a Prank"	Katherine Sandford	Gregory Woronchak and Hélène Cossette	January 7, 2007	317
Andy's innocent prank on school picture day turns into a supernatural experience.
70	18	"One Good Prank Deserves Another"	Gerard Lewis	Christopher Goodkey and Daniel Miodini	January 14, 2007	318
Andy becomes the school's landlord and takes full advantage of his alleged position.
71	19	"It Lurks in the Crawl Space"	Jon Minnis	Daniel DeCelles and Karine Charlebois	January 21, 2007	318
Andy pretends to run away from home by hiding in the crawl space underneath their house, but will anybody care about it?
72	20	"Prank-Watch"	Thomas LaPierre	Tapani Knuutila and Sylvie Lafrance	January 28, 2007	320
Andy joins the lifeguard training course to ensure that Craig not only fails the course but gives everyone an eyeful of his real talent.
73	21	"The Prank Days of Summer"	Nisha Muire	Daniel Miodini and Hélène Cossette	February 4, 2007	321
When Jervis flaunts all the money he's making on his summer jobs, Andy decides to make Jervis work much harder for his money.
74	22	"The Gift of Prank"	Katherine Sandford	Daniel DeCelles and Christopher Goodkey	December 17, 2006	322
Andy has to restrain himself from pranking in exchange for Christmas favours, but finds this difficult when their arrogant, spiteful neighbour competes with his dad for the outdoor light display.
75	23	"Prank-o-Mania"	Gerard Lewis	Karine Charlebois and Gregory Woronchak	February 11, 2007	323
Andy convinces everyone that Jen has Putrid Dog Mouth Disease and gets her quarantined.
76	24	"The Prank That Never Happened"	Jon Minnis	Tapani Knuutila and Sylvie Lafrance	February 18, 2007	324
Andy has to convince his Dad that a particular prank never happened or risk being sent to military school.
77	25	"Master Mom"	Thomas LaPierre	Daniel Miodini and Hélène Cossette	February 25, 2007	325
Andy inadvertently gets Mom elected president of the PTA and now he has to prank her out of her position before the other students turn on him. Craig and his gang, even Jervis doesn't tell us why are they mad at Andy.
78	26	"A Passing Prank"	Anne-Marie Perrotta and Tean Schultz	Daniel DeCelles and Christopher Goodkey	March 4, 2007	326
Andy has to study hard if he's going to get good grades and pass the year. However, the good pranking opportunities are very hard to resist.
