= BILBY Award =

Children's literature award

The BILBY Awards are organised annually by the Queensland Branch of the Children's Book Council of Australia. The name of the award, BILBY, is an acronym of 'Books I Love Best Yearly'.

These awards are children's choice awards. Each year Queensland children are asked to nominate their favourite book that they have read in the past year; only the winners from the previous two years are excluded from nomination. The nominations are made in three readership categories (see below). The nomination process is the first phase of the awards.

In each category, around five of the most popularly nominated books are grouped into shortlists. In the second phase of the awards students are encouraged to read the books from the list in their readership category and vote for their favourite title. The book receiving the most votes is declared the winner in its category.

== Award category and description ==
Prior to 1997 there were three Awards categories for primary school readers – Read Alone, Read Aloud and Read Australian – and one category for Secondary. In 1997 a readership format was introduced, though the Early Readers category was first called the Picture Book category, then the Early Childhood category [see below].

Currently there are three categories:

- Early Readers – for books for readers under 8 years old
- Younger Readers – for books for readers between 8 and 12 years old
- Older Readers – for books for readers over 12 years old.

== List of BILBY Award winners ==
=== Early Readers Award ===
Note: Before 2001, this award was called the "Early Childhood" (1990–1999), "Picture Book" (1998–1997) and "Read Alone" (1996–1990) awards.

Year	Author	Book	Citation
1990	Judy Blume	Superfudge	Winner
1991	Roald Dahl	The BFG	Winner
1992	Paul Jennings	Unreal!	Winner
1993	Roald Dahl	The Witches	Winner
1994	Paul Jennings	Undone!	Winner
1995	Gina Ingoglia	The Lion King	Winner
1996	Martin Handford	Where's Wally?	Winner
1997	David Legge	Bamboozled	Winner
1998	Margaret Wild and Ann James	The Midnight Gang	Winner
1999	Terry Denton	Gasp!	Winner
2000	Rod Clement	Grandad's Teeth	Winner
2001	Martin Handford	Where's Wally?	Winner
2002	Bob Graham	Buffy – An Adventure Story	Winner
2003	Narelle Oliver	The Very Blue Thingamajig	Winner
2004	Dr. Seuss	The Cat in the Hat	Winner
2005	Leigh Hobbs	Old Tom's Holiday	Winner
2006	Margaret Wild, illus. David Legge	Baby Boomsticks	Winner
2007	Kara LaReau, illus. Scott Magoon	Ugly fish	Winner
2008	Jackie French, illus. Bruce Whatley	Diary of a Wombat	Winner
2009	Roald Dahl	The Twits	Winner
2010	H I Larry	Zac Power: Poison Island	Winner
2011	Vicki Myron	Dewey: There's a Cat in the Library!	Winner
2012	Dr. Seuss	The Cat in the Hat	Winner
2013	David Legge	Bamboozled	Winner
2014	David Wiesner	Art & Max	Winner
2015	Mo Willems	Don't Let the Pigeon Drive the Bus!	Winner
2016	B. J. Novak	The Book With No Pictures	Winner
2017	Aaron Blabey	Pig the Pug	Winner
2018	Andy Lee, illus. Heath McKenzie	Do Not Open This Book	Winner

=== Younger Readers Award ===
Note: Before 1997, this award was called the "Read Aloud Award".

Year	Author	Book	Citation
1990	Roald Dahl	Matilda	Winner
1991	Roald Dahl	The BFG	Winner
1992	Roald Dahl	Charlie and the Chocolate Factory	Winner
1993	Morris Gleitzman	Blabber Mouth	Winner
1994	Roald Dahl	Fantastic Mr Fox	Winner
1995	David Kirschner	The Pagemaster	Winner
1996	Ruth Park, illus. Deborah Niland	When the Wind Changed	Winner
1997	Roald Dahl	Matilda	Winner
1998	Daisy Corning Stone Spedder, illus. Laurie McGaw	Polar, the Titanic Bear	Winner
1999	Bruce Whatley and R. Smith	Detective Donut and the Wild Goose Chase	Winner
2000	Andy Griffiths	Just Stupid!	Winner
2001	J. K. Rowling	Harry Potter series	Winner
2002	Andy Griffiths	Just Crazy!	Winner
2003	Bonnie Bryant	The Saddle Club series	Winner
2004	Andy Griffiths	Just Disgusting!	Winner
2005	Andy Griffiths, illus. Terry Denton	The Bad Book	Winner
2006	Andy Griffiths, illus. Terry Denton	Just Crazy!	Winner
2007	Andy Griffiths, illus. Terry Denton	The Cat on the Mat Is Flat	Winner
2008	Andy Griffiths	Just Shocking!	Winner
2009	Andy Griffiths	Pencil of doom!	Winner
2010	Jeff Kinney	Diary of a Wimpy Kid	Winner
2011	Jeff Kinney	Diary of a Wimpy Kid: The Ugly Truth	Winner
2012	Jeff Kinney	Diary of a Wimpy Kid	Winner
2013	Andy Griffiths, illus. Terry Denton	The 26-Storey Treehouse	Winner
2014	Michael Gerard Bauer	Eric Vale, Epic Fail	Winner
2015	Andy Griffiths, illus. Terry Denton	The 52-Storey Treehouse	Winner
2016	Andy Griffiths, illus. Terry Denton	The 65-Storey Treehouse	Winner
2017	Andy Griffiths, illus. Terry Denton	The 78-Storey Treehouse	Winner
2018	Andy Griffiths, illus. Terry Denton	The 91-Storey Treehouse	Winner

=== Older Readers Award ===
Year	Author	Book	Citation
1990	Sue Townsend	The Secret Diary of Adrian Mole, Aged 13¾	Winner
1991	S. E. Hinton	The Outsiders	Winner
1992	Martin Handford	Where's Wally?	Winner
1993	V. C. Andrews	Flowers in the Attic	Winner
1995	Melina Marchetta	Looking for Alibrandi	Winner
1996	Michael Crichton	Jurassic Park	Winner
1997	J. R. R. Tolkien	The Hobbit	Winner
1998	John Marsden	Tomorrow, When the War Began	Winner
1999	Morris Gleitzman	Bumface	Winner
2000	Melina Marchetta	Looking for Alibrandi	Winner
2001	J. K. Rowling	Harry Potter series	Winner
2002	J. R. R. Tolkien	The Lord of the Rings	Winner
2003	Various authors	Two of a Kind series	Winner
2004	J. K. Rowling	Harry Potter and the Order of the Phoenix	Winner
2005	J. K. Rowling	Harry Potter and the Prisoner of Azkaban	Winner
2006	J. K. Rowling	Harry Potter and the Half-Blood Prince	Winner
2007	Christopher Paolini	Eragon	Winner
2008	J. K. Rowling	Harry Potter and the Deathly Hallows	Winner
2009	Stephenie Meyer	Twilight	Winner
2010	Stephenie Meyer	New Moon	Winner
2011	Rick Riordan	Percy Jackson and the Lightning Thief	Winner
2012	Suzanne Collins	The Hunger Games	Winner
2013	J. R. R. Tolkien	The Hobbit	Winner
2014	Suzanne Collins	The Hunger Games: Catching Fire	Winner
2015	James Dashner	The Maze Runner	Winner
2016	Suzanne Collins	The Hunger Games: Mockingjay	Winner
2017	Ransom Riggs	Miss Peregrine's Home for Peculiar Children	Winner
2018	J. K. Rowling	Harry Potter and the Goblet of Fire	Winner

=== Read Australia Award ===
Year	Author	Book	Citation
1994	Randolph Stow	Midnite	Winner
1995	Gary Crew, illus. Steven Woolman	The Watertower	Winner
1996	Paul Jennings	The Gizmo	Winner

== See also ==
- List of Australian literary awards
- List of CBCA Awards
