= Just Macbeth! =

Shakespeare adaptation by Andy Griffiths

- First edition (publ. Pan Books)
- Author: Andy Griffiths
- Language: English
- Publisher: Macmillan
- Publication date: July 1, 2009
- Pages: 198
- ISBN: 9780330425346

Just Macbeth! is an adaptation of William Shakespeare's play Macbeth. It was written by Australian children’s author Andy Griffiths, produced by Bell Shakespeare, and was released as a book.

== Storyline ==
Andy, Lisa, and Danny are practicing a scene from Macbeth. They make a potion with all three of them then drink the potion, which sends them into the Macbeth play. After a battle, Andy and Danny walk and find three witches, who tell them that Macbeth is going to be Thane of Cawdor and Banquo's children will be king before disappearing. Andy and Danny then realized that they are in Macbeth; Andy is Macbeth and Danny is Banquo. Lennox then comes in and tells them that King Duncan would be arriving at Macbeth’s castle to celebrate and he would be staying the night there. Macbeth goes back to his castle where he finds that Lisa is Lady Macbeth. King Duncan and Lennox then arrive at their castle and celebrate their victory. Lisa tells Andy to kill the king. When Andy goes out to kill King Duncan, he meets Danny and his son Fleance. Andy kills the king in his sleep. Everyone is shocked to hear that the king has been killed. Because Duncan's son is away, Macbeth was decided to be king. Andy becomes increasingly suspicious of Danny and the witch’s prophecy. He orders two assassins to kill Danny and Fleance. They succeed in killing Danny but Fleance escapes. At the banquet, Danny's ghost haunts Macbeth, who runs away from the ghost in fear. The others who can't see the ghost think Macbeth is going mad. Macbeth then goes to visit the witches again. The witches summon spirits, who tell him that no man born of a woman can kill him. Andy thinks everybody is born from a woman, that no one can kill him, and that he will never be overthrown. He orders many people to be killed by his invention: the mash and pulverizing machine. A doctor and a nurse tell Andy that Lisa has gone mad and sleepwalks. Andy becomes increasingly guilty of what he has done. A guard then tells Andy that Lisa died and that an army of gnomes are attacking from England. Still convinced that no one can kill him, he fights the gnomes. MacDuff then fights Macbeth. MacDuff tells Andy that he was not born of a woman because "from his mother's womb he was untimely ripped" right before cutting Andy's head off. It is then revealed that the entire play was Andy, Danny, and Lisa’s version of Macbeth.

== Play ==
The stage adaption of Just Macbeth! was produced by Bell Shakespeare at the Sydney Opera House in summer 2010, and at the 2010 Edinburgh Festival Fringe. The show was directed by Wayne Harrison. Adelle Hopkins reviewed the Edinburgh run as "a fantastically funny introduction to Shakespeare for a younger audience" that would also appeal to adult audiences. Diana Simmonds observed the production's "sheer bravado of taking a tartan-clad send-up of the Scottish play to the heart of Midlothian".

=== Original cast ===
- Patrick Brammall as Andy
- Justin Smith as Danny
- Pippa Grandison as Lisa
- Rhiannon Owen as Jen
- Mark Owen-Taylor as Duncan
- John Leary as Lennox

== Book and film ==
Just Macbeth! was released as a book in June 2009. It contains pictures by Terry Denton, like it happens with the other books of the series. Several things were changed from the play, for example: the King sings a generic song, and Happy Tree Friends is changed to "Axe Wielding, Blood-Sucking Freaks".

== Self-references ==
All six Just! books are mentioned or quoted, and on page 66, there's all the weird creatures from the front covers of them.

- Just Tricking!:
- Just Annoying!: Wish You Weren’t Here; Garden Gnomes
- Just Stupid!: Busting; Runaway Pram; Food Fight; Chubby Bubbies
- Just Crazy!: Bandaid; A Crazy, Bad, Dumb, Bad, Bad, Dumb, Crazy, Bad Idea; Kittens, Puppies and Ponies
- Just Disgusting!:Brussel Sprouts; Go to Bed (book only); Two Brown Blobs; Shut Up!; The Story of the Very Stupid Boy and the Very Big Slug
- Just Shocking!: 101 Dangerous Things

The Bad Book is also mentioned on page 197, saying to look at all of the pages in the book to find out more about 'the bottom of the barrel'.

== Cultural references ==
- The play is an adaptation of the popular play Macbeth by William Shakespeare.
- Some of Shakespeare’s other plays (particularly Hamlet) are mentioned.
- Macbeth being cursed is brought up at the start of the play and later on when Danny visits Andy as an Angel.
- Wizz Fizz is mentioned several times.
- Danny told Andy he learned to fight from watching the film Kill Bill.
- When Andy and Danny are running across a field after the battle, a McDonald's sign is seen in the background.
- When Lisa says "Thank God you're here", Andy replies "Hey, it's just like that show!"
- King Duncan sings "Freak Like Me" in a karaoke match. (Stage adaptation only)
- After King Duncan is murdered, the Psycho "Shower Scene" music and scream is heard.
- Lisa states that Andy watches Happy Tree Friends. (Stage adaptation only)
- The spirits that tell Macbeth to beware of MacDuff and that no man born of a woman can kill him are Lisa Simpson and Yoda.
- In one scene, Andy mentions the Australian children's music group The Wiggles as people he wants to kill.
