= What's with Andy? =

- Also known as: Sacré Andy !
- Genre: Cringe comedy Physical comedy Surreal humour Slapstick; Adventure
- Based on: Just! by Andy Griffiths
- Directed by: Tim Deacon and Jon Minnis (season 1); Richard Paré and Gilles Dayez (season 2); Nick Vallinakis (season 3)
- Creative director: Jon Minnis (season 2)
- Voices of: Ian James Corlett
- Composers: Shuki Levy and Haim Saban (season 1); Noam Kaniel and Alain Garcia (season 2); Anthony Rozankovic (season 3)
- Countries of origin: Canada; United States (season 1); France (season 2)
- Original languages: English; French
- No. of seasons: 3
- No. of episodes: 78 (list of episodes)

Production
- Executive producers: Jacques Pettigrew; Michel Lemire (seasons 1–2); Andrew Makarewicz and Joe Purdy (season 1); Marie-Claude Beauchamp, Jacqueline Tordjman, and Olivier Dumont (season 2); Oliver Schablitzki (season 3)
- Producers: Danièle Joubert (seasons 1–2); Michel Lemire (seasons 1, 3); Bruno Bianchi (season 2)
- Running time: 22 minutes
- Production companies: CinéGroupe; Saban Entertainment (season 1); SIP Animation (season 2)

Original release
- Network: Fox Kids/Jetix (international); Teletoon (Canada); Super RTL (Germany, seasons 2–3)
- Release: June 30, 2001 – March 4, 2007

What's with Andy? (French: Sacré Andy !) is an animated children's television series loosely based on the semi-autobiographical Just! book series by Australian author Andy Griffiths. The series is produced by CinéGroupe and aired on Teletoon, with various Disney-affiliated foreign studios and networks involved throughout the production of the series.

The main character is Andy Larkin, a mischievous teen and the self-proclaimed "world's greatest prankster". The show follows him as he tries to perform elaborate practical jokes, or pranks, on people in the fictional town of East Gackle, as his best friend, Danny Pickett, helps him out with almost every prank; his antagonists include: his older sister, Jen Larkin; and the bullies Peter Lik and Andrew Leech. He has a crush on a girl named Lori Mackney, whom he usually tries to impress.

The first season features an American cast of voice actors (with the exception of Canadian-born Ian James Corlett) and takes place in the United States. However, starting with the second season, all voice actors and screenwriters are Canadians and the show is set in the Canadian Prairies. Throughout the series, Andy often breaks the fourth wall to address the audience, with the screen freezing in black and white in the first season – a distinctive feature of the show referred to as "Doodle Vision".

== Characters ==
=== Andrew "Andy" Larkin ===
Coming from a long line of pranksters which is from the male side of the Larkin family, Andy is a teenager who loves to prank and joke people as well as annoy his friends and family (especially his sister), but often gets into trouble. His best friend is Danny and he has a crush on Lori. His catchphrase is "Cheque, please!" His name comes from Andy Griffiths, whom he is based on.

=== Daniel "Danny" Tadeus Pickett ===
Andy's best friend and right-hand man, helping him out with countless pranks and jokes. His last name has always been Pickett. The name "Danny Pickett" is taken directly from the Just books. It's revealed in The Unfortunate One, that Danny is an Aries.

=== Lori Mackney ===
Andy's crush but she is dismayed by his childishness due to his pranking. It is hinted that she returns Andy's feelings and dislikes Jen because she thinks that Jen abuses Andy. She wears a cropped green tank top, blue skirt and slide sandals. She is based on Lisa Mackney from the Just books.

=== The Larkin family ===
- Mr. Al Larkin: Andy and Jen's father and Freida's husband who also used to be a prankster, known as "The Mystery Prankster and Jester", aka "The Mystery Prankster and Jester of East Gackle" (he hides this fact from his family). However, he was cured of pranking and joking by school counselor, Mrs. Murphy.
- Mrs. Freida Larkin: Andy and Jen's mother and Al's wife. She knows nothing about her husband's past as a prankster and jester.
- Jennifer "Jen" Larkin: Andy's older sister who is always cranky and irritable. She blames her younger brother Andy for almost everything and finds his practical jokes childish and unfunny. She is unaware of her father's past as a prankster and jester.
- Spank Larkin: Andy's fat and lazy dog. Spank frequently yawns, especially after going for a walk. He also appears to have flatulence problems.
- Norman Larkin: Andy's grandfather and Al's father who is also a prankster and jester, implying that the male side of the Larkin family comes from a long line of pranksters and jesters (apparently with the exception of Al, but in the episode "Mind Games" it was revealed that he also used to be a prankster and jester, possibly even greater than his son or father).

=== Recurring/minor characters ===
- Teri: Jen's best friend.
- Jervis Coltrane: A Canadian French snob who has a crush on Lori Mackney and dreams of being the Prime Minister of Canada.
- Peter Lik and Andrew Leech: Peter and Andrew are Andy's and Danny's nemeses. They are usually referred to as Lik and Leech.
- Craig Bennett: Jen's crush and one of the best athletes of East Gackle.
- Martin Bonwick: He is a stereotypically nervous nerd who very often gets bullied.
- Victor "Vic" Muskowitz (Mush): The pizza delivery man of East Gackle who is a good friend of Andy and Danny and he sometimes helps them with pranks.
- Steve Rowgee Jr.: A dumb police officer who is the incompetent son of Steve Rowgee Sr.
- Steve Rowgee Sr.: A police officer who is an old man, who always commands Steve Rowgee Jr. (his son) and is nicknamed the Iron Fisted Maniac.
- Principal DeRosa: He is the bad-tempered principal of the school in East Gackle who is obsessed with punishing Andy.
- Mr. Hutchins: One of the many teachers at East Gackle school, Andy likes to prank and joke him more than the other teachers.
- Mayor Henry K. Roth: The mayor of East Gackle.
- Mayor Simms: Mayor of West Gackle and Mayor Henry K. Roth's rival.
- Clyde: The janitor of the school.
- Hazel Strinner: She has a crush on Andy and Lori's protecting friend.
- Louella Berman: Frieda's best friend.
- Mrs. Wibbles: Principal DeRosa's secretary.

== Voice actors ==
Name	Season 1 VA	Season 2 VA	Season 3 VA
Andy Larkin	Ian James Corlett		
Danny Pickett	Bumper Robinson	Daniel Brochu	
Lori Mackney	Colleen O'Shaughnessey	Jaclyn Linetsky	Eleanor Noble
Jen Larkin	Jenna von Oÿ	Jessica Kardos	
Al Larkin	Dee Bradley Baker	Arthur Holden	
Freida Larkin	Cathy Cavadini	Susan Glover	
Teri	Cathy Cavadini	Holly Gauthier-Frankel	
Jervis Coltrane	Dee Bradley Baker	Bruce Dinsmore	
Peter Lik	Danny Cooksey	Mark Hauser	
Andrew Leech	Scott Parkin	Craig Francis	
Craig Bennett	Carlos Alazraqui	Matt Holland	
Martin Bonwick	Dee Bradley Baker	Michael Yarmush	
Mush	Mushond Lee	Mathew Mackay	
Steve Rowgee Sr.	Dee Bradley Baker	Terrence Scammell	
Steve Rowgee Jr.	Tom Kenny	Craig Francis	
Mr. Hutchins	Dee Bradley Baker	Bruce Dinsmore	
Principal DeRosa	Dee Bradley Baker	Terrence Scammell	
Mayor Roth	Tom Kenny	Rick Jones	

=== Additional voices (first season only) ===
- Jodi Carlisle
- Tim Conway – Andy's grandfather
- E. G. Daily
- Melissa Disney
- Jeannie Elias
- Barbara Goodson
- Melissa Greenspan
- Jess Harnell
- Maurice LaMarche
- André Sogliuzzo
- Kath Soucie
- Jim Ward

== Episodes ==
Season	Episodes		Originally released	
Season	Episodes		First released	Last released
1	26	Canada	June 30, 2001	April 7, 2002
1	26	U.S.	September 22, 2001	July 21, 2002
2	26		September 3, 2003	April 11, 2004
3	26		September 3, 2006	March 4, 2007

== Production ==
The show is based on Andy Griffiths' children's series of Just! books (which were illustrated by Terry Denton), although many episodes are not directly based on the books. Changes from the books to the TV series include Andy's last name, which was originally that of his creator, and other minor name changes, such as Lori's name being Lisa in the books. The book series was based on the early life of Andy Griffiths.

It was originally an interactive Flash movie with completely different voice actors and a promotion for Fox Kids. A TV adaptation was announced by CinéGroupe on March 23, 2001 for broadcast on Teletoon and Fox Family later on in the year. Saban Entertainment participated in production and held distribution rights (Saban International). Ownership of Series 1 was shared between the two companies; CineGroupe held all rights to the series in Canada, Fox Family Worldwide held US rights, while Pueblo Films, a shareholder of Saban International Paris, held rights in all other territories.

The main production of the series moved to Canada in season 2, which was co-produced with the French studio SIP Animation (itself split from Saban Entertainment) and in association with German channel Super RTL. All the voice cast had to be replaced with this move except Andy Larkin's voice actor Ian James Corlett, as he was Canadian. The rights to Series 2 were shared between CinéGroupe, SIP and FKE, with CinéGroupe holding Canadian rights as with Series 1, SIP holding France and all other French-speaking territories, and Fox Kids Europe holding the rest. Distribution services outside Canada were handled by Disney subsidiary Buena Vista International Television, after Saban International's distribution arm was folded under it at the beginning of May 2002.

In September 2003, the voice of Lori in Season 2, Jaclyn Linetsky, who also played the title character on Caillou, Meg in Mega Babies, and Megan O’Connor in 15/Love, died in a traffic collision during production. She had managed to finish all of Season 2 before her death, but for the following season, she was replaced by Eleanor Noble. The episode "Nurse Jen" was dedicated in her memory.

Season 3 was commissioned by Super RTL, who handled distribution rights to the season in German-speaking territories until October 2021. Unart Productions held distribution in Australia, New Zealand, and Asian territories until the end of November 2011, while CinéGroupe handled the rest of the world.

By 2015, the whole series was later added to CinéGroupe's distribution partner HG Distribution's catalogue.

== Release ==
=== Broadcast ===
What's with Andy? originally aired on Teletoon in Canada. In Australia, where the books originated, it was broadcast on Fox Kids.

==== United States ====
In the United States, the series was first shown on September 22, 2001 on Fox Family Channel, later ABC Family. On January 17, 2005, it premiered on Toon Disney, which also had rights to the second but not the third season.

==== Europe ====
In Europe, the series was licensed to Fox Kids Europe, with television distribution serviced by Buena Vista International Television. The show aired on Fox Kids networks in the UK, France and Greece, with Super RTL in Germany and TF1 in France having free-TV rights at the time. By June 2003, plans for the series to air on Fox Kids in Central and Eastern Europe were announced, along with plans for a free-TV expansion for the series, with plans to pre-sell the series to Fox Kids in the Netherlands, Mediatrade in Italy, Antena 3 in Spain, SIC in Portugal and RTÉ in Ireland.

The show continued to air on the network after the rebranding as Jetix.

=== Home media ===
==== VHS ====
On April 8, 2003, CinéGroupe Star released a set of three VHS tapes called "Double Trouble"/"Sacré Délire", which featured an episode each from this show and The Kids from Room 402, alongside a music video from the Pig City tie-in album "Reggie and the Rashers". Volume 1 featured the episode "It Came from East Gackle", Volume 2 featured the episode "Just Stuffing", and Volume 3 featured the episode "Rhyme Time". The releases were sold in separate English and French versions, respectively.

==== DVD ====
As with many other Saban Entertainment series, the only major English-language DVD release is by Czech distributor North Video, featuring both Czech and English audio and original video (with English-language text) in the original production order. The first 33 episodes (including all 26 episodes from season 1) were released on 10 volumes, from April 13 to July 15, 2010.

The show was also released on DVD in other European countries, but only in the respective languages (i.e. without the original English audio). All of season 2 (and most of season 1) was released on DVD in Germany, and the entirety of season 1 was released on 5 DVD volumes in Russia.

=== Streaming ===
Season 3 was available on the Canadian YouTube channel Encore+ in both English and French until its shutdown in November 2022. This season was previously available in German on Kividoo.

=== Music ===
The three German-language theme songs for each season were released on Toggo music CDs volumes 4, 7, and 17 respectively by Sony Music, with the first and third-season songs being extended versions. The original English-language theme was also released on volume 2.

The soundtrack (including themes) from the first two seasons is distributed as production music by Red Brick Songs (formerly Casablanca Media Publishing) in Canada.

== Reception ==
What's with Andy? received very high ratings in a number of countries.

On Teletoon in Canada, it was reported to be the second highest-rated original production as of October 2007. The show's sense of humour proved popular enough that Teletoon's vice president of programming cited it as an influence on the later Teletoon original Carl^{2}.

The series also had about 40% market share in France (Fox Kids/TF1) and Germany as of 2003. It proved particularly popular in Germany, winning a fall 2002 Super RTL cartoon election poll with 60% of the vote, and obtaining the second-highest ratings on the channel in July 2006. Andy also beat SpongeBob SquarePants in a mock election held to elect a Super RTL character as "children's chancellor" alongside the real 2005 German federal election, despite strong competition from the launch of Nickelodeon in Germany around the same time.
