= St. George's School of Montreal =

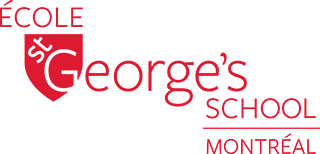

Location
- 3100 The Boulevard (High school campus), and 3685 The Boulevard (Elementary school campus); Montreal, Quebec, H3Y 1R9; Canada; 45.4940°N 73.5968°W

Information
- School type: Independent day school
- Founded: 1930
- Head of School: Michael O'Connor
- Grades: Kindergarten - Grade 12
- Enrollment: 460
- Language: English
- Colours: Red and Blue
- Sports teams: Dragons
- Website: www.stgeorges.qc.ca

St. George's School of Montreal is an independent school in Montreal, Quebec, Canada founded in 1930. It consists of two campuses: the elementary school campus in Westmount, Quebec, and the high school campus in Montreal just a 15-minute walk from Beaver Lake and Mount Royal Park. The school is a co-educational, non-denominational day school, where students do not wear school uniforms, except during physical education class. St. George's School of Montreal is a member of The Quebec Association of Independent Schools (QAIS), The Canadian Accredited Independent Schools (CAIS), and The National Association of Independent Schools (NAIS).

St. George's was founded by a small group of parents who, inspired by the movement for progressive education, rejected the authoritarian ways associated with conventional education. They believed that learning should be a natural and enjoyable activity related to the developmental stages and needs of the child. During most of the 20th century, it was notable for being one of the most avant-garde, liberal and innovative schools in the province of Quebec, largely due to its child-centred philosophy (which was quite exceptional in the 1930s, and unique in Montreal). The school's pedagogy is guided by its Founding Principles: (1) The child should have abundant opportunity for creative expression; (2) Adapt education to the differences of the individual child; (3) Health must come first; (4) Group-consciousness and social-mindedness should be developed; (5) Learning comes from doing; (6) The classroom should be freed from unnatural restraints.

St. George's is a day school, however there is a family boarding program for international students. As the school receives subsidies from the Quebec government from Grades 7 to 11, all students attending the high school section are required to have a certificate of eligibility allowing them to attend government-funded English schools in accordance with Bill 101.

== History ==
In 1930, St. George's first prospectus was the following:

“A central aim of the St. George’s School is the release of creative energy in the child. Every child wants to know a multitude of things that they do not know. Every child is endowed with the capacity to express themselves, and this innate capacity is immensely worth cultivating.”

In 1930, the first class at St. George's was made up of 22 students. The original building was located between the current elementary school and high school, at the corner of Clarke Avenue and The Boulevard, in Westmount, Quebec. Over the next few years enrollment grew exponentially, and the school was relocated to a series of residential buildings at the corner of Ramezay Avenue and The Boulevard, where the high school remains today. By 1946, the school had grown to more than 80 students from preschool to Grade 9.

In 1955, 25 years after the school's founding, students presented a sketch of their "dream school" to the Principal at the time, Agnes Matthews, and within two years, the high school building, as it appears today at 3100 The Boulevard was built. In 1958, the school had its first graduating class of eight students.

In 1971, the former St. George Snowshoe and Curling Club located at 3685 The Boulevard was acquired by the school, and was subsequently renovated and expanded into what today houses the elementary school.

=== Heads of school ===
Name	Tenure
Ms. Dorothy Cross	1930–1935
Dr. Agnes Matthews	1935–1963
Mr. Raymond Lester	1963–1966
Mr. Robert T. Leicester	1966–1975
Mr. Vincent P. Skinner	1975–1977
Mr. Bahadur C. Bhatla	1977–1978
Ms. Norma Passaretti	1978–1981
Rev. Murray C. Magor	1981–1986
Mr. Bahadur C. Bhatla	1986–1987
Mr. Leslie I. Larsen	1987–1990
Mr. Bahadur C. Bhatla	1990–1993
Mr. James A. Officer	1993–2014
Ms. Sharon Klein	2014–2019
Ms. Nathalie Bossé	2019–2021
Mr. Michael O'Connor	2021–

== Notable alumni ==
- Melissa Altro 1999, voice actress for Arthur
- Ian C. Ballon 1979, internet author and lawyer
- Howard Bilerman 1987, music producer, and ex-member of the band Arcade Fire
- David Bruck 1966, criminal defense attorney
- Dov Charney 1986, founder and CEO of American Apparel
- Sara Diamond 2012, pop musician and Montreal Canadiens anthem singer
- Gregory Dudek 1975, professor of robotics and computer science
- Nora Gold 1969, Canadian author
- Corey Hart 1978, pop musician
- Naomi Klein 1987, journalist, author and activist
- Shawn Levy 1985, film director and producer
- Jaclyn Linetsky 2003, actress (died September 8, 2003)
- Susan Low-Beer 1960, ceramic artist
- Kevin O'Leary 1970, entrepreneur and TV personality, Candidate for leader of the Conservative Party of Canada
- Jade Raymond 1992, video game executive
- Lindsay Robins 2004, pop rock musician
- Martin Sherwood 1958, science-fiction writer
- Nikki Yanofsky 2011, jazz singer
