= Treasure Fever! =

Book by Andy Griffiths

- First edition
- Author: Andy Griffiths
- Language: English
- Series: Schooling Around!
- Genre: Children's
- Publisher: Pan Macmillan
- Publication date: 1 April 2008
- Publication place: Australia
- Media type: Paperback
- Pages: 216
- ISBN: 978-0-330-42389-2
- Followed by: Pencil of Doom!

Treasure Fever! (La Fievre du Tresor) is the first book of the Schooling Around series by Andy Griffiths. It was published in April 2008 by Pan Macmillan Australia. It was published in French in 2009 by Scholastic .

== Plot ==
Henry McThrottle is a student at Northwest Southeast Central School, and discovers there is buried treasure somewhere in the school. As Henry and his friends try to find the treasure, their secret is found out and everyone wants it.
