= Bumface =

1998 children's book by Morris Gleitzman

- First edition cover
- Author: Morris Gleitzman
- Publisher: Viking Children's Books
- Publication date: October 29, 1998
- ISBN: 978-0-670-88337-0

Bumface (ISBN 9780140387971) is a children's novel written by Australian author Morris Gleitzman for readers age 10-12. First published in 1998, it has won several awards, and has been regularly named in polls as a favourite children's book in Australia.

== Plot summary ==
Angus Solomon is an eleven-year-old boy and the son of a popular soap opera television actor. He barely balances his school life with single-handedly looking after his actor mother's two other children to different fathers. Every night he tells stories to his siblings about the character of "Bumface", a swashbuckling pirate character he created, and a character in his school's play. Angus dreams of living the brave, free life of his character but he feels alone in the life he cannot escape from. Angus is tired of having to constantly take on the parental responsibilities of his mother, father and step-parents as they go about their carefree lives. Angus is soon fired from the school play for missing rehearsals due to his surrogate parenting duties, and his best friend Scott begins taking the side of school bully Russell assuming Angus is neglecting their friendship.

While scheming how to stop his mother to not have another child with her new partner, Angus meets Rindi, a girl his age and also a fan of pirates. Rindi and Angus quickly become best friends and the two try and break into a convention to steal contraceptive devices. Angus soon learns that Rindi is having a crisis of her own, as she is arranged to be married to a man in India, Patel. After his mother announces her engagement to her new partner, Angus comes up with an idea to sabotage Rindi's planned wedding by asking her to marry him. The two decide to marry behind the set of a wedding programme at the television station Angus' mother works at, following the minister's words to be "married in the eyes of God". After the exchange of vows, Angus' siblings accidentally trip over and bring down the set, exposing Angus and Rindi on air.

Rindi's parents disregard the televised wedding, and fly her to India unwillingly to be wed to Patel. Angus interrupts the school play, calling upon the audience to help rescue Rindi, but he is stopped by his school teacher. Angus' mother intervenes, along with his dad, and chaos ensues. At breaking point, Angus stands up to his parents of their unfair treatment of him on the school stage. Two weeks later, Angus receives a parcel from Rindi containing a videotape of her escaping the wedding and a letter saying she will be returning home.

Angus discovers his recent outburst to his parents has had little effect and that his mother is taking on a new role which will mean even less time with the family and more responsibility for Angus. Angus' mother arranges a birthday dinner for him at her television studio with his dad and the step-parents. He is joyed to see the return of Rindi, who had been sent back to live in Australia for good. Angus gets into his Bumface character, swinging above the dinner table on a rope while flinging mashed potato at the adults. While Rindi and the children cheer him on, the adults shout at Angus to "grow up". "Not yet" he replies.

== Reception ==
Kathryn James discusses Gleitzman's playing with social roles in that Angus acts as an adult by shouldering the responsibilities of looking after his siblings, whereas his mother is largely absent and his father leaves the work to Angus.

Awards for Bumface
Year	Award	Result	Ref.
1999	BILBY Award	Winner	
1999	COOL Fiction for Younger Readers Award	Winner	
1999	YABBA Award	Winner	

== See also ==
- Parentification
