= Gregory Dudek =

Canadian computer scientist

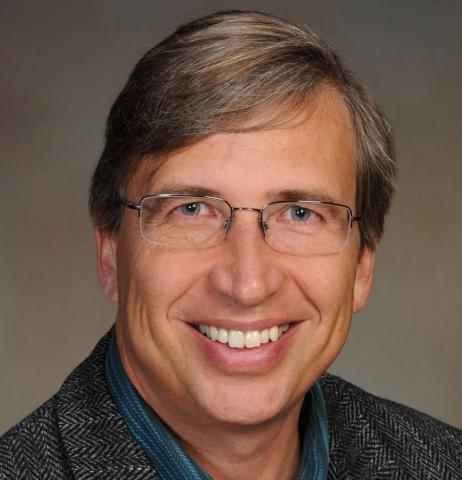
- Born: Montreal, Quebec
- Citizenship: Canadian
- Education: Queen's University, University of Toronto
- Occupation: Professor
- Writing career
- Subjects: Robotics, Computer Science
- Notable awards: James McGill Chair, Distinguished James McGill Chair, J.-Armand-Bombardier Prize from Association francophone pour le savoir, Canadian Image Processing and Pattern Recognition Society award for research excellence and service to the community (dual award), Reginald Fessenden Award for Science Innovation, IEEE Gold Medal

Gregory L. Dudek is a Canadian computer scientist specializing in robotics, computer vision, and intelligent systems. He is a chaired professor at McGill University where he has led the Mobile Robotics Lab since the 1990s (a role now shared with Prof. Dave Meger). He was formerly the director of McGill's school of computer science and before that director of McGill's center for intelligent machines.

He held a position as the VP, Research and founding Lab Head at the Samsung AI Center, Montreal, from 2019-2023 serves as Director of the NSERC Canadian Robotics Network, and is a co-founder of tech startup Independent Robotics.

During his career, Dudek has co-authored >450 scientific publications on subjects including autonomous navigation, robots that learn, mobile robotics, machine learning, telecommunications, 5G/6G network optimization, robot localization and navigation, information summarization, human-robot interaction, sensor-based robotics, multi-robot systems, computer vision, marine robotics, self-driving vehicles, recognition, RF localization, distributed system design, and biological perception. He has published three books, including a textbook co-authored with Prof. Michael Jenkin on “Computational Principles for Mobile Robotics”.

== Research and career ==
Dudek's early career focused on sensing for robots and the theory of the complexity of robot localization, such as path planning and execution and appearance based visualization of so-called "trash can robots". With his colleagues he produced the first formal proof of the complexity of global robot localization in a metric environment (i.e. how hard it is, in the worst possible case, for a robot to determine its position if it totally lost) and examined the use of WiFi signature mapping for mapping and location estimation long before it was widely known. Other early work addressed issues related to the use of topological maps and the complexity of topological mapping (an abstract idealized form of robotics problem), robot position estimation using photographic data, and the automated detection of interesting images. He also did early work metrically accurate robot positioning, notably using sonar sensors or computer vision, and is the first to use the term "localization" to refer to problem of quantitatively accurate robot position estimation from sensor data.

Dudek later transitioned into field robotics, and in particular marine field robotics. This work was inspired, in part, by a desire to help conservationists monitor coral reef health, a seemingly simple yet logistically challenging task. Towards this end, Dudek and colleagues developed an autonomous, amphibious robot named Aqua that can monitor coral reef health. Challenges of building an autonomous underwater include building a robot out of materials that are appropriate for the aquatic environment and water-proofing the interior, perception in an environment with limited visibility, localization and navigation of an unknown and dynamic environment, and navigation in a 3D environment. Aqua can perform tasks such as following a diver, walking on land or swimming in water, and make models of the underwater world (e.g., map coral reefs). The work resulted in a spin-out start-up company, Independent Robotics, which develops reliable commercial platforms to use as a base for underwater research.

In 2013, Dudek launched the NSERC Canadian Field Robotics Network (NCFRN), later renamed the NSERC Canadian Robotics Network (NCRN). This networks brings together investigators in academia and industry to do collaborative research and build mutual support, and spans 8 universities, 9 industrial partners, 3 government agencies and 5 international partners.

In 2018, Dudek joined Samsung as VP, Research and Lab Head at the Samsung AI Center, Montreal. The lab has two main streams: a) developing advanced cellular communications and the optimization of 5G/6G networks, and b) developing sensors for robotic systems in the home.

Key themes in the Mobile Robotics Lab at McGill in 2023 include sensor-based robotics, namely the use and understanding of sensor data through computer vision and machine learning, as well as decision-making under uncertainty, using techniques including deep reinforcement learning and probabilistic modelling.

Dudek has participated in the organization and administration of numerous research events, conferences, and journals, including being the General Chair of the International Conference on Robotics and Automation (ICRA) in 2019.

== Early life and education ==
Dudek was born in Montreal, Canada. His mother, Stephanie Dudek, was a clinical psychologist and professor at the University of Montreal. His father, Louis Dudek, was a poet, critic, literary activist, publisher, and professor at McGill University. Dudek's early education took place at St. George's School of Montreal and Vanier College. He subsequently obtained his B.Sc. in Physics and Computer Science at Queen's University and his M.Sc. and Ph.D. in Computer Science at the University of Toronto. He built his first computer, a Gardner Hexapawn, out of woods, beads, and paper. His first public appearance was at age 4 in a performance of a play by Berthold Brecht at McGill University.

== Activities ==
Dudek's research interests allow him to travel across the world to many interesting places, such as Japan, Korea, Belgium, England, Chile, and Mexico. He and his colleagues often make trips to ocean-adjacent destinations to run experiments on Aqua, an amphibious robot.
