= The 26-Storey Treehouse =

2012 Australian children's novel

- First edition cover
- Author: Andy Griffiths
- Audio read by: Stig Wemyss
- Illustrator: Terry Denton
- Publisher: Pan Macmillan Australia
- Publication date: 1 September 2012
- Pages: 348
- ISBN: 978-1-74261-127-3
- Preceded by: The 13-Storey Treehouse
- Followed by: The 39-Storey Treehouse

The 26-Storey Treehouse is a 2012 children's novel by Australian author Andy Griffiths and illustrated by Terry Denton.

== Publication history ==
The 26-Storey Treehouse is the sequel to The 13-Storey Treehouse. It was published in September 2012 by Pan Macmillan Australia. By 2014, more than 80,000 copies of the book had been purchased.

== Plot summary ==
The story follows Andy and Terry, who are living in a 26 storey treehouse, are struggling to finish their book on time with distractions. According to the book, the 26 storey treehouse has “A dodgem car rink, a skate ramp (with a crocodile-pit hazard), a mud fighting arena, an anti gravity chamber, an ice-skating rink (with real ice-skating penguins), a recording studio, a mechanical bull called Kevin, an ATM (Automatic Tattoo Machine), an ice cream parlour with 78 flavours, the Maze of Doom, a badminton court, a wind turbine, and a swing.”

After the introduction of the treehouse, Andy tells the readers of the story of how he and Terry met. His backstory starts of young Terry living in a tall building within a city. But he stopped telling the readers, because he was interrupted by Mr Big Nose by saying he needs to publish his next book on Friday. He then restarts his backstory again, but Terry interrupts him because his sharks one of his floors are sick for eating Terry's underpants. Andy didn't believe him, but then Terry explained that when he tried to wash his underpants, the sharks accidentally ate it. After Terry said his reason, he calls Jill with his talking tube, which then stretches for a long distance to Jill's cottage. When Terry called Jill, Jill said that he can't go because she was in a meeting with her thirteen cats. But as soon as Terry said it was urgent, Jill soon got to her cat sleigh to arrive at their treehouse.

When Jill arrived, she and her cats dived into the tank for the sharks. She tried to do some solutions, but none of them worked. When she rose to the surface, she said to the boys that she has to do operation for the sharks called an “Open-Shark Surgery”. Andy wants to tell his backstory, but Jill doesn't let them and instead to come with her instead. The boys then put on their diving suits to do the operation, then Jill then proceeded to give the sharks a dose of a sleeping potion. When they were digging in one of the shark's belly, they then found Captain Woodenhead's wooden head. As they still dig on the shark's belly, Terry finally then found his underpants. After he found it, they now swam back to the floor of the treehouse.

When Andy and Terry get back to the surface, Terry asks what story was Andy about to tell the readers. Andy tells him that he was about to tell the story of how they met, but Terry confuses that story with Hansel and Gretel and later confuses that story with Little Red Riding Hood and Cinderella. Terry eventually gives up and lets Andy tell the story.

The story begins with a younger version of Terry in his childhood with his parents in a "very tall tower". In the story, his parents are very strict on keeping Terry safe and take thing to extreme measures such as never letting him go out of his house, keeping him in a padded room with seatbelts, and many other obscure rules. They even gave him "self-inflating underpants to keep him safe. But one day, the power board to all the alarms that Terry's parents installed overheated and caught on fire. Terry ran to his window, but seeing it was locked, he decided to smash a chair through it and jump through the window. Luckily, a tree saved him and bounced him straight towards a river. His self-inflating underwear actived and so, Terry floated from the river and into the sea. Fortunately, Andy was also out at sea in a swan pedal boat and so, he saved Terry.

After all that storytelling, Andy decides to get some ice cream with Terry from Edward Scopperhand's ice cream parlour. Terry can't decide what flavour of ice cream to get so he ends up getting all 78 flavours. He eats the ice cream while Andy tells his side of the story.

The story starts with a younger version of Andy in his childhood with his parents. As a child, Andy didn't like all the rules that his parents made such as making him brush his teeth, making him go to school and other basic rules. Andy was fed up with all these rules, so he decided to run away from home so he didn't have to follow any rules. One day, when he was at a restaurant stealing some food, he accidentally flipped over a table. A waiter saw him and chased him all the way to a lake. Andy stole a swan-shaped pedal boat and pedalled away from the waiter. Andy was then carried out far out to the sea. After many days of floating out at sea, he spotted Terry in his self inflating underwear and decided to save him.

== Reception ==
Darienne Stewart of Common Sense Media praised the book's "energetic black-and-white illustrations" that "reward close attention" and its "extended illustrated gags". In a starred review, Publishers Weekly said the work has a "cartoon-laden carnival of slapstick and self-referential humor" and liked illustrator Terry Denton's "furiously scrawled line drawings" that "milk the silly, gross-out gags for everything they're worth".

Writing for the Herald Sun, Theodore Murrihy called it "really good". The Sunday Telegraph said, "Fun and laughter are the order of the day in this crazy picture book". Elaine E. Knight of the School Library Journal called The 26-Storey Treehouse "wildly humorous without being smart-alecky or sarcastic" and lauded its "conversational, matter-of-fact narration". Jo Goodman of Magpies and Katie Ekberg of The Australian Women's Weekly reviewed the work.

During the Kids Reading Oz Choice (KROC) Awards put on by the Darwin Council Libraries and held in 2013, The 26-Storey Treehouse received the "book of the year" award for older youth.

== Audiobook adaptation ==
The audiobook adaptation of The 26-Storey Treehouse was made by Brilliance Audio in 2015. Performed by Stig Wemyss, the audiobook is one hour and 38 minutes long and takes up two CDs. Terri Perper, a reviewer for the School Library Journal, praised Wemyss' performances of both the leading characters and supporting characters as "delivered believably with humor and finesse". She cited Wemyss' portrayals of Jill's affluent parents and the pirate-style voice of Captain Woodenhead. She further praised the use of sound effects and classical music for giving "a dramatic and engaging backdrop" to Wemyss's "remarkable narration".
