= The Bad Book =

Collected stories by Andy Griffiths

- First edition
- Author: Andy Griffiths
- Illustrator: Terry Denton
- Language: English
- Genre: Children's
- Publisher: Pan Macmillan
- Publication date: 2004
- Publication place: Australia
- Media type: Print (paperback)
- Pages: 172 pp (paperback edition)
- ISBN: 978-0-330-36425-6 (paperback edition)
- OCLC: 156029078
- Followed by: The Very Bad Book

The Bad Book is a 2004 book by Andy Griffiths, who wrote the novel The Day My Bum Went Psycho, with Terry Denton, who also did the illustrations. It is a compilation of stories, drawings, rhymes and poems about such quirky characters like 'Bad Baby', and 'Bad Daddy' doing such bad things like miss-throwing knives, and blowing up objects and people at Christmas. It was followed by The Very Bad Book (2010) and The Super Bad Book (2011)

== Stories (in chronological order) ==
The Bad Book contains forty-five stories overall.

- Bad Jack Horner - Nursery Rhyme
- Bad Humpty Dumpty - Nursery Rhyme
- Bad Diddle Diddle - Nursery Rhyme
- The Bad Ant - Story
- Joan Purst - Limerick
- Greedy Little Grace - Poem
- Bad Daddy and the Big Swing - Cartoon
- Badtown - Story
- The Old Lady who swallowed a Poo - Song
- The Girl Who Slammed Doors - Limerick
- Bad Riddles - Jokes
- The Sad Bad Bad-man - Story
- Little Willy - Poem
- Jeff Pest - Limerick
- Bad Mummy And The Very Busy Six-Lane Hig-way - Cartoon
- Penny McRose - Poem
- Bad Terence - Poem
- Bad Baby - Cartoon
- Silly Billy - Poem
- Very Bad Riddles - Jokes
- The Bad Little Boy, His Father and the Very Tall Mountain - Story
- Bad Little Betty - Poem
- Bad Daddy Says 'No' - Cartoon
- Little Snotty Steve - Poem
- Bad Baby's Christmas - Cartoon
- Ruth Punny - Limerick
- Pirates, Trucks, Bombs, Sharks, Dinosaurs and Football - Story
- The Bad Knife-Thrower - Cartoon
- The Girl Who Asks Too Many Questions - Story
- Pete Pedderson - Limerick
- Bad Mummy and the Big Cliff - Cartoon
- The Bad Old Duke of York - Story
- The Bad Granny - Story
- Little Bad Riding Hood - Story
- Peter, Peter Junk-food Eater - Poem
- The Bad Builder - Story
- Ed & Ted and Ted's Bad Dog Fred - Story (Similar writing in The Cat On The Mat Is Flat)
- Very, Very Bad Riddles - Jokes
- If You're Bad and You Know it - Song
- The Day Nothing Bad Happened - Story
- Bad Mummy and the Very Hungry Lion - Cartoon
- Very, Very, Very Bad Riddles - Jokes
- Bad Baby at the Circus - Cartoon
- Badword Puzzle - Puzzle
- The Very Bad Story - Story
- The Very, Very Bad Story - Story
- The Very, Very, Very Bad Story - Story

== Awards ==
In 2005 The Bad Book was awarded the BILBY Award for Younger Readers.
