= A Particular Cow =

Australian children's picture book by Mem Fox and Terry Denton

- Author: Mem Fox
- Illustrator: Terry Denton
- Language: English
- Genre: Children's picture book
- Published: 2006 (Penguin/Viking)
- Publication place: Australia
- Media type: Print (hardback)
- Pages: 32 (unpaginated)
- ISBN: 9780670042319
- OCLC: 156734951

A Particular Cow is a 2006 children's picture book by Mem Fox and illustrated by Terry Denton. It is about a cow that usually goes on an uneventful walk every Saturday until one Saturday all this changes.

== Reception ==
Reviews of A Particular Cow were mixed. Kirkus Reviews compared it to Rosie's Walk, and although writing that "Denton captures the chaos in simple, bland cartoon illustrations, and Fox’s repeated use of "particular" gives the text a playful beat ..", criticised it for being too short and instead recommended Mr. Gumpy's Outing, and Great Gracie Chase: Stop That Dog!. A reviewer for Bookseller+Publisher wrote: "Putting it all together, I found A Particular Cow a fine idea, but was a little disappointed in its execution". In contrast, Publishers Weekly wrote that "the book's slapstick-humor and verbal dexterity will delight youngsters—as will the particular idea that sometimes, even an ordinary walk can turn into something quite extraordinary". School Library Journal wrote that "the story is told with a dry wit and an economy of words, and the illustrations interpret the action with panache".

A Particular Cow has also been reviewed by the following magazines: Horn Book Guides, and Library Media Connection.

It is a 2007 ABIA Australian Book of the Year for Younger Children shortlisted book.
