= Just Shocking! =

2007 book by Andy Griffiths

- The cover of the Australian version
- Author: Andy Griffiths
- Illustrator: Terry Denton
- Cover artist: Terry Denton
- Language: English
- Series: "Just!"
- Genre: Children's, comedy
- Publisher: Pan Macmillan
- Publication date: September 2007
- Publication place: Australia
- Media type: Paperback
- Preceded by: "Just Disgusting!"
- Followed by: "Just Macbeth!"

"Just Shocking!" is the sixth book released of the "Just!" series by Andy Griffiths. Released in late September 2007 in Australia, it tells 10 short but shocking stories about Andy.

In 2008 the book won a KOALA Award for Younger Readers, a COOL Award Fiction for Younger Readers, a BILBY Award in the Younger Readers category, a West Australian Young Readers' Book Award for Younger Readers and a YABBA – Fiction for Younger Readers.

This is the longest book in the "Just" series.

== Stories ==
=== Fun with a fire hose ===
Andy and Danny imagine the circumstances and possibility of playing with a fire hose. Terry thinks of what could go wrong and Andy finds solutions for all of them. In the end they decide to do it. This is written in a script-like format.

=== I am a Ro-bot ===
After seeing Jen read I, Robot, Andy pretends to be a robot and gets trapped in a closet. His parents call him "[The Andy 2000]" and he gets into a wardrobe and a vacuum talks to him.

=== Balloons of Doom ===
A choose-your-fate adventure in which, no matter what you do, you always end up dying for some crazy reason. You have to blow fifteen pink balloons and put them in Jen's bedroom while she is asleep for her to see in the morning. In the end, there is a plot twist, where Jen inhales a deadly odour you made with your breath while blowing up the balloons, and she dies. Your family gets caught in the stench and, as a result, die in the explosion because of the birthday candle fuses connecting with the stench, igniting the fumes.

=== Unfunniest Home Video ===
Andy and Danny try to stage a home video for "Australia's Funniest Home Videos", but Danny keeps getting distracted by a kitten called Fluffy. The camera eventually gets wrecked by the falling ladder, Jen catches Andy and Danny's incident on her camera phone, and sends it off to Australia's Funniest Home Videos.

=== 101 Dangerous Things ===
A list of 101 dangerous things.

=== A Really, Really Good Excuse ===
Andy tells his class a very elaborate excuse for being late, claiming he was late because of his dentist appointment. In the story Andy realises that he has underpants too small. He tries to get them back at home but the door is locked. He tries to get in but is reported and arrested. He gets sent to prison to meet a criminal who can escape prisons with teaspoons. They escape and are taken to the criminal lair. With shock he realizes that the criminals are planning to shrink the police's underpants. He convinces them that good is better than evil and he gets his underpants unshrunk. He gets arrested again but when he tells his story he is freed. He arrives at school. The story has comic-like illustrations. When Andy finishes telling the story, he realizes that in the time it took to tell the story, school has finished and that his mother will take his tooth out dentist or not.

=== Why I Love Choco Pops in 50 Words or Less ===
Andy writes a fifty-word essay of why he loves Choco Pops, and then includes thirty-five postscripts that have little to nothing to do with the essay.

=== Lemonade Roulette ===
It is a very hot day. When Andy goes to get a drink of water, he gets six cans of lemonade, then Andy and Danny get an idea. The friends play 'lemonade roulette', similar to Russian Roulette where you have to shake and shuffle cans of lemonade. Mr. Bainbridge, returning home with his wife and Andy's parents, gets a can of lemonade blasted in his face when he goes to get a drink, and Andy gets in big trouble, but then Mr Bainbridge says that he played Lemonade Roulette when he was a young child himself.

=== The Exploding Butterfly Story ===
A picture story about explosions including pink butterflies, a bluebird, a man and the man's wife and lambs.

=== Fun with a Monster Truck ===
Andy and Danny imagine the circumstances and possibility of driving in a monster truck.
