= Mascot Madness! =

2009 book by Andy Griffiths

- First edition (Australia)
- Author: Andy Griffiths
- Language: English
- Series: Schooling Around!
- Genre: Children's
- Publisher: Pan Macmillan
- Publication date: 1 April 2008
- Publication place: Australia
- Media type: Paperback
- Pages: 216
- ISBN: 978-0-330-42389-2
- Preceded by: Pencil of Doom!
- Followed by: Robot Riot!

Mascot Madness! is the third book of the Schooling Around series by Andy Griffiths. It was published in 2009 by Pan Macmillan Australia.

== Plot ==
Mr Brainfright dresses in a banana mascot suit to support Northwest Southeast Central School in the Northwest Interschool Sports Event and gets mascot madness.

Mr Brainfright also teaches the class to visualise all the events in the Northwest Interschool Sports Event, while Mr Grunt, their sports teacher, tortures them cruelly and gives 50 laps around the oval as punishment to those who fail.

Finally the event DOES come, and Henry McThrottle has to replace Mr Brainfright in his banana suit. However, Northwest West Academy's mascot, a real pit bull terrier, attacks Henry and he accidentally participates in the decathlon while trying to run away.

The story ends with Mr Brainfright's Guide to Banana Mascotting.
