= The Very Bad Book =

Book by Andy Griffiths

- Author: Andy Griffiths
- Illustrator: Terry Denton
- Language: English
- Publisher: Pan Macmillan Australia
- Publication date: 31 August 2010
- Publication place: Australia
- Pages: 174
- ISBN: 978-0-330-42565-0
- Preceded by: The Bad Book
- Followed by: The Super Bad Book (expected in 2011)

The Very Bad Book is a 2010 book of short stories for children written by Andy Griffiths and illustrated by Terry Denton. The Very Bad Book is the sequel to Griffiths and Denton's "The Bad Book" published in 2004. Griffiths has announced plans to release a third title in the series, The Super Bad Book, in 2011.

== Synopsis ==
Much like its predecessor, The Bad Book, which turned standard children's fairy tales and nursery rhymes on their head by rewriting them as the "bad" version, this book contains a number of tales that are "very bad". The characters are very bad, the illustrations are very bad, and the poems and jokes are all very bad, all with the aim of delighting the children (and their parents) who will read this book. There are 51 stories, poems, jokes, etc. in all.

== Reception ==
The Logan Reporter called The Very Bad Book "... actually very good", noting that the trepidation some parents might feel at introducing their children to such bad characters is unfounded as the book makes clear through its absurdity that these characters are bad and not to be emulated.
