= Just Annoying! =

Short story collection by Andy Griffiths

- First edition
- Author: Andy Griffiths
- Illustrator: Terry Denton
- Cover artist: Terry Denton
- Series: Just!
- Publisher: Pan Macmillan
- Publication date: 1998
- Publication place: Australia
- Media type: Paperback
- Preceded by: Just Tricking
- Followed by: Just Stupid!

Just Annoying is a short story collection by children's author and comedian Andy Griffiths. It is the second in the Just series. The stories, as expected from the title, recounts more short stories where Andy annoys everyone with his amazing feats.

== Stories ==
=== Are We There Yet ===
After Andy annoys his father by repeatedly asking, "Are we there yet?" and trying to get rid of a fly in the car, he is kicked out of the car in the middle of nowhere (presumably in western New South Wales). A young boy on his motorcycle sees Andy and picks him up to chase Andy's car and to come back to them. After the man catches up to the car, Andy jumps from the motorcycle to the car. Andy's car stops to a halt when his parents see Andy on the windshield. Andy's father goes berserk, telling Andy he was going to be picked up in only five minutes.

=== Copycat From Ballarat ===
Andrea (actually Andy annoying his sister Jen by crossdressing as a girl, copying her) goes to the school dance, attempting to impress Craig Bennett (who is every girl's crush, including a girl named Jen, Andy's sister). After the dance, Andrea embarrasses herself in front of her crush, Craig, by falling on her butt.

=== Wish you Weren't Here ===
Andy visits his grandparents in Mildura with a gnome from his neighbour's garden. When strange things start happening around him, he begins to suspect that the gnome is alive.

=== Imaginary Friends ===
Andy gets out of going to the school sports by looking after his imaginary friend, Fred. He gets out of going because he thinks he is better at everything than everyone else, and wants to give them a fair go. But when his mother gets attached to Fred, he invites a mean imaginary friend called Damien, who she gets attached to as well.

=== In the Shower with Andy ===
Andy wants to see what it feels like to have the shower full of water during the time Mr. and Mrs. Bainbridge are at Andy's house for dinner with his parents. With a lot of time on his hands, Andy seals up the door with a silicone gun from his father. He accidentally breaks the hot tap, and ends up nearly drowning in cold water. The only way out is through the fan. He reaches up and pulls it, and is on the insulation patches as the water rises up the stall. With his rubber duck with him, a fiber in the vent pokes him, causing him to drop the duck due to being startled by the pain. He goes after the duck, but realizes quickly that the ceiling there is unsupported. The ceiling caves in and he finds himself lying legs spread on the dinner table, nude.

=== Would You Rather? ===
At the dinner table with his family, Andy asks a silly question to his whole family at the dinner table - "would you rather be eaten by ants or lions?". Andy and his father have a whole discussion about this while occasionally being interrupted. The story ends with no real answer from the three.

=== Murder, Bloody Murder! ===
Andy and Danny scream, "MURDER, BLOODY MURDER!" at Andy's neighbour Mr. Broadbent for ages. Mr. Broadbent gets very angry, so he gets them to shut up. They suspect that his bad mood is due to stress, so they attempt to "de-stress" him but this annoys him further, and they end up yelling the phrase again.

=== The Last Jaffa ===
While watching a James Bond movie (presumably a repeat of The Spy Who Loved Me) at the cinema stuck behind a lady with tall hair, Andy loses his last Jaffa and annoys a lot of people while finding it. He is accused of being a thief and a pervert while looking for his Jaffa, and has security called on him. He uses a variety of spy-inspired strategies to eventually avoid the people in the movie trying to catch him. Eventually, to escape the crush of people after him, Andy jumps through the screen and finds many Jaffas, along with other candy, found left over on the floor from people's past times at the theater.

=== Swinging on the Clothesline ===
Andy spends a lot of time trying to break the clothesline speed record. This annoys his parents a lot, due to Andy constantly breaking said clothesline many times and forcing them to by a new one every time he breaks it. In order to make sure Andy stops this behavior, Dad trades a huge dog called Spot with Sooty (the family pet) and leaves it to guard the clothesline. Andy uses a fluffy cat toy (from Jen's room) as bait and while the dog was busy destroying it, he clips a collar around the dog and hangs on to the opposite corner of the line so the dog cannot reach him. In order to get the dog to swing him around and stop attacking the cat toy, he insults the dog's parents calling the father a "sewer rat" and the mother a "chihuahua". Suddenly going much too fast to hold on, Andy ends up letting go of the line, straight towards the kitchen window. The last spoken line is said by Andy: "If the window doesn't kill me, my parents will."

== Reception ==
According to Publishers Weekly, Just Joking! and Just Annoying! "should tickle readers' funny bones".

While reviewing the audiobook narrated by Stig Wemyss, AudioFile called Griffiths "modern Australian Dennis the Menace". They noted that the book's title "can refer to Andy's outrageous antics or to the audio presentation itself", which they state "will appeal more to children than to their listening parents".
