= Martin Sherwood =

Martin Sherwood (10 January 1942 – 10 May 2011) was a British science fiction author, organic chemist and an editor of Chemistry & Industry.

== Science fiction ==
His novels were Survival (New English Library, 1975, ISBN 0-450-30369-1) and Maxwell's Demon (Ultramarine, 1976, ISBN 0-450-02857-7; New English Library, 1976, ISBN 0-450-03300-7).

== Chemistry ==
Sherwood had a Ph.D. in organic chemistry and was editor of industry journal Chemistry & Industry from 1976.
