= The 13-Storey Treehouse =

Children's novel by Andy Griffiths and Terry Denton

- First edition
- Author: Andy Griffiths
- Illustrator: Terry Denton
- Series: The Treehouse series
- Genre: Surreal humour
- Published: 2011 (Pan Macmillan Australia)
- Publication place: Australia
- Pages: 239
- ISBN: 978-0-330-40436-5
- LC Class: PZ7.G88366 Th 2011
- Followed by: The 26-Storey Treehouse
- Website: http://www.andygriffiths.com.au/abook/?id=9781760986520

The 13-Storey Treehouse (known in the US as The 13-Story Treehouse) is a 2011 book written by author Andy Griffiths and illustrated by Terry Denton, and a stage play based on the book. The story follows Andy and Terry, who are living in a 13-storey treehouse, struggling to finish their book on time among many distractions and their friend Jill, who lives in a house full of animals and often visits them. According to the book, the 13-storey treehouse has "a bowling alley, a see-through swimming pool, a tank full of man-eating sharks, vines you can swing on, a games room, a secret underground laboratory, a lemonade fountain, a vegetable vaporiser, a marshmallow machine that follows you around and automatically shoots marshmallows into your mouth whenever you're hungry, an observation deck, a giant catapult, a room full of pillows and a library and theatre room”.

The 13-Storey Treehouse won the Australian Book Industry Awards Book of the Year for Older Children 2012 and the 2012 COOL Award for Fiction for Older Readers.

== Plot ==
The book begins with the narrator and fictional depiction of the author, Andy Griffiths, giving an introduction to himself, his friend and illustrator Terry Denton, and their treehouse.

Andy wakes up one morning, and on his way to getting breakfast, he meets Terry, painting a white cat yellow to turn it into a canary, or a "catnary". After being dropped from the treehouse, the cat grows wings and flies away. Andy and Terry are then greeted by their animal-loving friend Jill, who wants to find her pet cat, Silky. It turns out that the cat Terry painted was Silky. Andy and Terry try to remain innocent when Jill questions them. Right after Jill leaves, Andy and Terry receive a call via a 3D video phone by their publisher, Mr Big Nose, who is upset that the duo is behind schedule.

They soon try to come up with ideas for a book, but Terry only has a few self-portraits of his finger. Since they're Terry's only pictures in his folder, he and Andy end up in an argument which starts a drawing competition. Once they compete for the best banana drawing, Andy gets upset and gets in a fight with Terry, armed with a giant banana Terry grew in the introduction. Terry ends up knocking Andy out and pours a bucket of water to save him. They come back to ideas for their book, and it turns out that Andy has four pages that read "Once upom a time". After Andy read his book, Terry noticed that the word "upon" was misspelled. But before anyone can say more, Terry gets distracted by television as his favorite show, Barky the Barking Dog, is airing. After half an hour of watching Barky, Andy tries to get Terry to work on the book, but Terry says that his second-favourite show, Buzzy the Buzzing Fly, is about to start. Andy is not amused at all and throws the TV out the window.

Right afterwards, the duo are greeted by Bill the Postman, who is giving them sea-monkeys that Terry ordered. Andy is very unhappy with this. Terry goes down to the Secret Underground Laboratory to hatch the sea monkeys. After Andy waits for a long time for him to come back, he goes down to the Secret Laboratory, where he finds Terry adding the water drop by drop to make sure that the sea-monkeys don't suffocate or drown. Andy gets even more bored and angry while Terry finishes hatching a sea-monkey. He then starts feeding it, but it grows into a mermaid named Mermaidia whom the duo put in a bathtub. She and Terry grow attached, leaving Andy alone. He overhears the love conversation from the bath door, which ends in Terry kissing Mermaidia. Once Terry runs off, Andy enters the bathroom secretly and finds out that Mermaidia was a sea monster in disguise. Andy records her singing a song about how disgusting she is. He runs down the stairs to find Terry, who is eating marshmallows. After being shown the proof that Mermaidia is a monster, Terry sides with Andy, and questions on what to do. They end up going to the underground laboratory so they can shrink her down with the banana enlarger. They later flush "Mermaidia" down the toilet.

Later, the duo began to work on their book, but Terry was too sad to concentrate. Andy then gets Terry popcorn and lemonade to cheer him up. Terry additionally got himself bubblegum. He burps a bubble, but it was so big that he had trapped himself. Terry floats away and Andy does a golf swing which successfully saved him.

Then, Terry gets an idea for a book about a "super finger". So, they wrote and illustrated it. Terry gets distracted by a package, which contained the real sea monkeys, he then goes to the lab to make the sea monkeys. However, the sea monkeys were causing chaos. Terry grabs the giant banana and whacks the flying objects that the monkeys threw out of the tree. Then the duo launched the monkeys and the giant banana far away with a catapult.

When Andy and Terry begin to write their book, a giant gorilla starts shaking the tree and yelling “BA-NA-NA!” Then a chauffeur arrives, informing Terry has won the Barky the Barking Dog drawing competition and gets to meet Barky. Barky barks at the giant gorilla, but the gorilla stomped on Barky and squishes him. As the duo loses hope, 13 flying cats, led by Silky, begin fighting the gorilla, which was successful. The cat-canaries then lift the gorilla away.

A doorbell rings; however, the duo discovered it was Jill, who had seen Silky. Andy confessed that it was Silky but Terry turned her into a canary. But Jill was glad and thanks Terry.

However, Andy is still upset with how he and Terry haven't got their book done, but Terry suggests that they write what happened that day. They write the events up and with the help of Jill in a Santa-like sleigh, get their book to Mr Big Nose for it to be published.

== Sequels ==
The book has spawned a series of sequels, each of them adding 13 stories and new characters, as well as continuing the use of meta and absurdist humor. The series concluded with the 13th entry, the 169-Storey Treehouse.

- The 26-Storey Treehouse (released in September 2012)
- The 39-storey Treehouse (released in September 2013)
- The 52-storey Treehouse (released in September 2014)
- The 65-storey Treehouse (released in August 2015)
- The 78-storey Treehouse (released in August 2016)
- The 91-storey Treehouse (released in August 2017)
- Terry's Dumb Dot Story (released in February 2018)
- The 104-storey Treehouse (released in July 2018)
- The 117-storey Treehouse (released in July 2019)
- The 130-storey Treehouse (released in October 2020)
- The 143-storey Treehouse (released in October 2021)
- The 156-storey Treehouse (released in September 2022)
- The 169-storey Treehouse (released in September 2023)
- Treehouse Tales (released in March 2022)
- The Treehouse Fun Book 1 (released in March 2016)
- The Treehouse Fun Book 2 (released in July 2018)
- The Treehouse Fun Book 3 (released in April 2019)
- The Treehouse Joke Book (released in September 2019)
- The Treehouse Joke Book 2 (released in May 2021)
- The Bumper Treehouse Fun Book (released in December 2021)
- The Guide to the Treehouse (released in November 2023)
