= Just Crazy! =

Fourth book in the Just! series

- Australian cover
- Author: Andy Griffiths
- Illustrator: Terry Denton
- Cover artist: Terry Denton
- Language: English
- Series: Just!
- Genre: Children's fiction, short story
- Publisher: Pan Macmillan Australia
- Publication date: 1 August 2000
- Publication place: Australia
- Media type: Print (Paperback)
- ISBN: 978-0-330-39727-8
- Preceded by: Just Stupid!
- Followed by: Just Disgusting!

Just Crazy (renamed Just Wacky in Canada), is the fourth book in the Just! series by Andy Griffiths, published by Pan Macmillan Australia. It contains nine short stories centred around Andy Griffiths.

The book won the BILBY Award in the Younger Readers category in 2002 and 2006.

== Stories ==
=== Band-Aid ===
Andy tries to take off a band-aid just under his left eye before school pictures day, which he got it when he found glasses on a footpath on his way home from school and fell in a roadworker's trench after putting said glasses on, as he thought putting them on would make him smarter thanks to a survey in the news paper. After a series of failures (including tweezers, which only results in three-pages worth of pain and anguish), he winds up getting another cut... just under his right eye, which is bleeding profusely. The chapter ends with Andy stating he's gonna need a band-aid for this cut.

=== The Dog Ate It ===
Andy and Danny, using plastic soldiers and a blowtorch make two aliens for their cardboard UFO for a school project. Andy's dog, Sooty, swallows them and the UFO as well. Due to wrecking all of the other soldiers and the fact that they can't build another UFO, Andy and Danny use cigarette buts so Sooty can throw them back and sooty

=== A Crazy, Bad, Dumb, Bad, Bad, Dumb, Crazy, Bad Idea ===
During the planning of a fete by the school, Andy gets a "good, great, brilliant, great, great, brilliant good, great idea" to try flying like a kite using a large number of helium-filled balloons (including four weather balloons which spell "FETE") with Danny holding a rope to secure Andy and prevent him from floating way. But when Danny accidentally let's go, Andy soon finds out what a "crazy, bad, dumb, bad, bad, dumb, crazy, bad idea" this really was...

=== Rubbish ===
Andy must take out the trash, the truck passes by their house when Andy forgets to take the bin out, so he is forced to go to the next street and beat the truck. He succeeds in beating the truck but looks inside the bin and realizes his mother threw out something precious to him: his rubber duck. After falling in the bin trying to get it out, he is scooped up along with the rubbish and is tossed inside the truck. Unfortunately, he eventually gets out at the park where Lisa is there waiting for him. Not only was it rubbish night, it was also Valentine's Day, disgusted by Andy's grungy appearance, she runs off.

=== Um-mah! ===
Andy has to babysit two of his cousins, Eve and Jemima, but both of them are exhibiting bad behavior like Eve jumping onto Andy's ceiling fan. When Andy's mother comes home, they blame everything on Andy.

=== Pinch ===
Andy basically dreams of destruction and trouble around him and to his house caused by Danny, and when he pinches himself to wake up he just finds himself in another dream.

=== Kittens, Puppies and Ponies ===
Andy writes a story titled Kittens, Puppies and Ponies about three baby animals playing and having a peaceful time in their town in a short story competition, assuming that this was the judges' demand. Since it fails, Andy mixes it up by making it dreadful and evil. Doing this causes Lisa to be amazed by Andy's writing. However, since Lisa was crying about it, it gave the impression it was a bad thing so he blamed it on Danny. Eventually the story still didn't win, instead Danny was credited for being runner-up in the school's competition of literature.

=== Learn to Read With Andy ===
Like a Beginner Reader's book (with a big font as well), Andy gets in trouble by bouncing on the bed, swearing and biting his mother.

=== Mudmen ===
Locked out of his house, Andy is nude since the shower towel wrapped around him is taken off by Sooty. Andy's father sees him naked so he tells him to put on some clothes, he also comes out and Sooty shoots out from under the house takes his towel as well. Since both don't have the key to get inside, the two ponder on what to do to get clothes. Knowing Jen and Andy's mother are in Mildura to visit their aunt, Andy slips accidentally on the backyard mud and falls, and the whole back is covered in mud and this brings him an idea. He gets mud on him and tells his father to do it too. They go through backyards to the father's work area where they keep overalls in the shed. When they get there, Andy opens the window to get them since the door is locked. It then starts to rain, leaving them naked again. After it rains Mr. and Mrs. Bainbridge (the father's boss and his wife) come up in the driveway. They see the two on each other trying to break into the shed. As a result, Mr. Bainbridge fires Andy's father.
