= Jaclyn Linetsky =

Canadian actress (1986–2003)

- Linetsky in 2002
- Born: Jaclyn Michelle Linetsky; January 8, 1986; Montreal, Quebec, Canada
- Died: September 8, 2003 (aged 17); Brossard, Quebec, Canada
- Cause of death: Traffic collision
- Resting place: Kehal Israel Memorial Cemetery, Dollard-des-Ormeaux
- Education: St. George's High School, Montreal
- Occupation: Actress
- Years active: 1994–2003
- Notable work: Kate's friend in Kart Racer (2003)
- Television: Caillou (2000–2003); Mega Babies (1999–2000); What's with Andy? (2001–2003); 15/Love (2004–2006)

Jaclyn Michelle Linetsky (January 8, 1986 – September 8, 2003) was a Canadian actress who voiced the titular character in Caillou and Megan O'Connor on 15/Love.

== Early life ==
Linetsky was born on January 8, 1986, at the Jewish General Hospital to Jewish parents, Terry (née Weiner) and Larry Linetsky. She had two older siblings, Kelly and Derek. Linetsky was raised in Dollard-des-Ormeaux, then moved to Hampstead, both suburbs in Montreal, Quebec. She graduated from St. George's School of Montreal in 2003, and she gave a speech at the graduation ceremony.

== Career ==
Linetsky began acting at age eight, performing in theatre productions. Her first major gig was in a milk radio advertisement at age 10.

Linetsky provided the voice of the title character in the animated series Caillou from 2000 until her death in 2003. She also provided the voices for Bitzi in the animated series Daft Planet (2002); Lori Mackney in the second season of What's with Andy? (2003–2004) replacing US voice actress Colleen O'Shaughnessey; Kit on Kit & Kaboodle. Shei-Hu, his cousin Shei-He, and a large group of other mice as well as additional voices on Sagwa, the Chinese Siamese Cat; Yukari on Tommy & Oscar; Brenda on Rotten Ralph and Meg in Mega Babies.

Other roles in voice acting included, The Kids from Room 402, Wunschpunsch, The Country Mouse and the City Mouse Adventures, Jim Button and video games Alex Builds His Farm and Evolution Worlds.

In 2003, Linetsky was cast in the tennis-circuit-themed dramatic series 15/Love on YTV. Her character, Megan O'Connor, was falling in love with Sebastian Dube, played by co-star Vadim Schneider.

== Death ==
On September 8, 2003, Linetsky and Vadim Schneider were on their way to the set of 15/Love in Saint-Césaire, Quebec, in a Dodge Caravan. For unknown reasons, the Dodge Caravan went off its original trajectory around 10:00 a.m. and across the middle band of the highway, finishing in the wrong direction on Highway 10 West in Brossard. The van swerved into oncoming traffic, crossed the median, and struck a 20-foot semi-truck head on, causing the vehicle to burst into flames. Both actors were knocked unconscious by the impact.

Schneider died instantly on impact from multiple physical trauma while Linetsky went into cardiac arrest and died hours later from the combined effects of physical trauma, severe injuries, and burns. They were both 17 years old.

As news of the accident spread, numerous friends and co-stars paid tributes and offered condolences to the Linetsky and Schneider families.

Filming for 15/Love was cancelled and the crew put the show on a two-week hiatus, citing a desire to speak with their families before determining what to do with their characters.

On September 10, 2003, a funeral was held for Linetsky, with over 1,500 mourners in attendance. She was buried in Kehal Israel Memorial Park in Dollard-des-Ormeaux, Quebec.

Linetsky was replaced by Annie Bovaird as the voice of Caillou. She was also replaced by Eleanor Noble as the voice of Lori Mackney in What's with Andy? and her and Schneider’s characters in 15/Love were written to have died in a plane crash off-screen.

In a statement, Stuart Snyder, President and CEO of Cinar Corporation, wrote:

"Jaclyn's voice enchanted thousands of children and viewers and she brought her own special personality and character to Caillou. She was a very talented performer and will be deeply missed by us all. On behalf of everyone at CINAR, I want to express our most sincere and heartfelt sympathies to Jaclyn's family."

== Tributes ==
The episode of What's with Andy? entitled "Nurse Jen" was dedicated to her memory, as was the 15/Love episode entitled "Curve Balls" and the Caillou film Caillou's Holiday Movie. The very last episode of 15/Love was also dedicated to her memory. In 2009, St. George's School of Montreal, Linetsky's alma mater, renamed their performing arts program "The Jaclyn Linetsky Performing Arts Program" in her honour.

== Filmography ==
=== Film ===
Year	Title	Role	Notes
2003	Kart Racer	Kate's Friend	

=== Television ===
Year	Title	Role	Notes
1997	The Country Mouse and the City Mouse Adventures	Additional voices	
1998	Kit & Kaboodle	Kit (voice)	
1998–1999	Jim Button	Additional voices	
1999	Tommy & Oscar	Yukari (voice)	
1999–2000	Mega Babies	Meg (voice)	
1999–2001	Rotten Ralph	Brenda, Additional voices	
2000	The Kids from Room 402	Additional voices	
2000–2003	Caillou	Caillou (voice)	Lead role (seasons 2-3)
2000–2001	Wunschpunsch	Additional voices	
2002	Daft Planet	Bitzi (voice)	
2002	Sagwa, the Chinese Siamese Cat	Shei-Hu, Shei-He, Additional voices	6 episodes
2003–2004	What's with Andy?	Lori (voice)	Season 2 only Some episodes aired posthumously
2004	15/Love	Megan O'Connor	13 episodes All aired posthumously

=== Video games ===
Year	Title	Role	Notes
2002	Evolution Worlds	Ricardo / Yuko	
