= Wizz Fizz =

Australian brand of sherbet

Wizz Fizz is an Australian brand of sherbet produced by Fyna Foods Australia Pty Ltd, first introduced in 1947.

It is typically sold in 18g paper sachets, containing a fine powder and a small, edible spoon to aid consumption.

== History ==
The brand originated as part of a confection called Happy Pops, a combination of lollipop and sherbet, including packaging which featured cowboy inspired by the television character Hopalong Cassidy. The sherbet component was later marketed separately as Wizz Fizz in 1947.

Between 1966 and 1986, Wizz Fizz sachets showcased Disney characters such as Mickey Mouse, Donald Duck, Pluto, and Uncle Scrooge. In the late 1990s, new characters, including 'Screaming Mimi,' 'Weird Wally,' 'Gross Gus,' 'Nerdy Neil,' 'Mad Myron,' 'Kooky Kaz,' and 'Doctor Freak,' were introduced. A 2011 relaunch featured a planetary theme with characters called 'Super Star Kids,' which was later succeeded by monster-themed designs.

During the late 1990's, Fyna Foods Australia Pty Ltd produced over 16 million Wizz Fizz sachets annually at its Melbourne factory.

== Products ==
Products in the Wizz Fizz range include:

- Wizz Fizz Original Sherbet.
- Wizz Fizz Black and Orange Tongue.
- Sherbet Cones, introduced in the 1970s and consisting of a wafer cone with marshmallow, hundreds and thousands and sherbet.
- Wizz Fizz Fizzy Fruity Pops Lollipops.
- Wizz Fizz Fizzers available in strawberry, cola, lemon and orange flavors.
- Wizz Fizz Party Pack which contains a mix of Wizz Fizz Original Sherbet, Wizz Fizz Lollipops, Wizz Fizz Fizzers & Fads.

Products in the previous Wizz Fizz Range include:

- Ring Fizz, which contained a ring in the packet.
- Blue Tongue Sherbet.
- Sour Sherbet.
- Strawberry Sherbet.
- Cola Wizz Fizz.
- Hoppy Pops, lollipops with sherbet mixed inside them, featuring 'Hop-a-long Cassidy' on the packaging

Limited Edition Wizz Fizz Products include:

- Wizz Fizz Easter Eggs available during Easter. consists of a milk chocolate egg with sherbet cream and popping candy center.
- Bubblegum Wizz Fizz.
