= The Cat on the Mat Is Flat =

Book

- First edition cover
- Author: Andy Griffiths
- Illustrator: Terry Denton
- Publisher: Pan MacMillan
- Publication date: 2006
- ISBN: 978-0-330-42260-4

The Cat On The Mat Is Flat (2006) is a book written by Australian children's author Andy Griffiths and illustrated by Terry Denton. The book uses larger fonts and pictures, and parodies the style of Dr. Seuss books, with the title being an obvious parody of The Cat in the Hat.

== Stories ==
The Cat On The Mat Is Flat contains nine rhyming stories:

- The Cat, The Rat, The Mat and the Baseball Bat
- Ed and Ted and Ted’s Dog Fred
- Pinky Ponky the Shonky, Wonky Bonky Donkey
- Frog on a Log in a Bog
- Harry Black, the Sack, the Snack and a Sneaky Snack Stealing Yak called Jack
- Duck in a Truck in the Muck
- Unlucky Lou, a kind Kangaroo, a hole in a Shoe and some Extra-Super-Fast-Sticking Super Roo Glue
- Bill and Phil and the Very Big Hill
- Andy G, Terry D, The Brave Tea Lady and the Evil Bee

== Trivia ==
- Most of the illustrations are stick figures.
- After 'Andy G, Terry D, The Brave Tea Lady and the Evil Bee', there are the tests from the Just! series, plus the poem from the back of The Bad Book, and a sneak peek of What Bumosaur is That?
