= Just! =

Series of short story collections

- Just Tricking! Just Annoying! Just Stupid! Just Crazy! Just Three for Free! Just Disgusting! Just Shocking! Just Macbeth! Just Doomed!
- Author: Andy Griffiths
- Illustrator: Terry Denton
- Cover artist: Terry Denton
- Country: Australia
- Language: English
- Genre: Children's, comedy short story collection
- Publisher: Pan Macmillan
- Published: 1997 – 2012
- Media type: Print (paperback)

Just! is a series of short story collections by Australian children's author Andy Griffiths, illustrated by Terry Denton and based on the author's early life. It has been described as a portrayal of the antics of a "notorious mischiefmaker" who plans various pranks and schemes to, among other things, dodge doing a chore or going to school. The series, whose first book was released in Australia in 1997 as Just Tricking! and later in North America as Just Kidding, consists of nine books. The Canadian animated series What's with Andy?, which ran on Teletoon from 2001 to 2007, was loosely based on this book series.

== Background ==
Griffiths began writing when he was in the fifth grade when he purchased a typewriter at a second-hand stall at school and created his own magazine, which he sold there for less than five cents. In high school he began writing for the school's magazine. At university he studied English and American literature, wrote songs for his own rock band, and studied to become a teacher. He began publishing the humorous books that were the precursors to the Just! series during his teaching career.

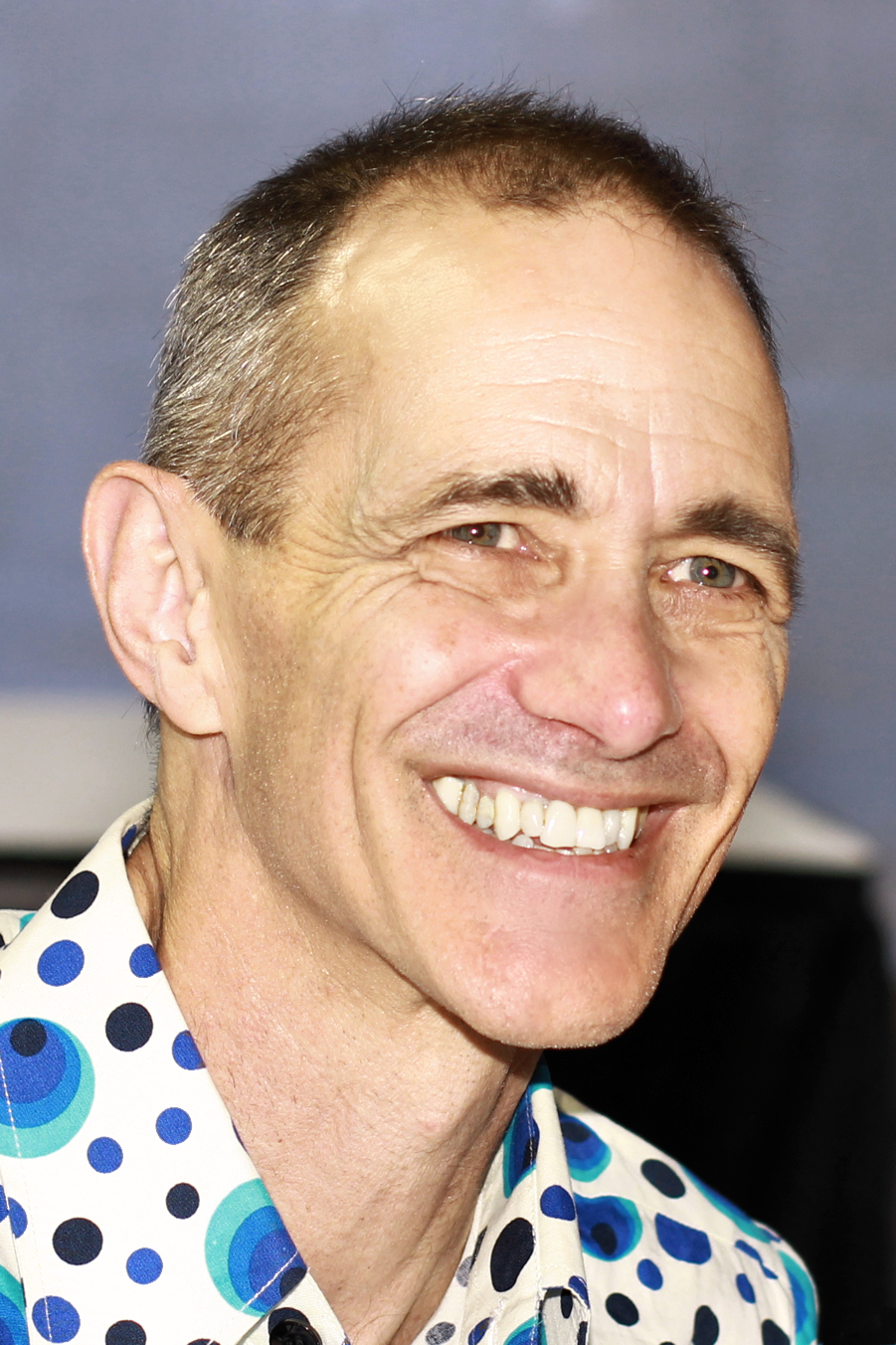
Author of the "Just!" series, Andy Griffiths

== Style ==
Mark Macleod notes that much of the stories in Just Tricking deal with the day-to-day lives of the target audience, school-aged children, such as avoiding going to school, and the subsequent battle between parent and child and, ultimately, who wins in such a scenario.

== Reception ==
Andrew McMichael from Western Kentucky University writes:

“The idea is to appeal to their sense of the absurd and crazy, and to push (but not cross) the boundaries of what their parents might consider socially acceptable. The books seem to take the socially accepted norms that kids are forced into in their early years and twist them.”

Mark Macleod writes in The interdisciplinary Press that Just Tricking, the first book in the series, is “fiction for a generation whose favourite response to any lack of resolution is the shrug, ‘whatever’”. Macleod also claims that the first-person tense of the book and the naming of the main character Andy blurs the line between fiction and autobiography. Thus Macleod describes this character as ‘living in the elusive space between the creator and the text’.

== Details of the series ==
=== Just Tricking! ===
Alternative Titles: Just Joking! and Just Kidding!

Released: 1997

This book begins by asking to take the "Tricking Test" to find out if the book is suitable, scoring one point for each 'yes' answer. Humorously, whether you scored 0 or 5, it says you will love this book.

=== Just Annoying! ===
Released: 1998

A Publishers Weekly review stated that "Denton's scribbled pen illustrations fill up the margins on every page, with jokes, bizarre flip book animations and other absurdities".

=== Just Stupid! ===
Released: 1999

Just Stupid! contains various silly short stories about things such as repairing snail shells, riding baby prams, and nonsensical dreams. The book received a BILBY Award in the Younger Readers category in 2000.

=== Just Crazy! ===
Alternative Title: Just Wacky!

Released: 2000

Similar to the first title in the series, Just Tricking!, this book asks readers to take the "Crazy Test", asking questions like, "do you look in the mirror and see a crazy maniac staring back at you?" and "do you sometimes get the urge to take your clothes off and cover yourself in mud?"

=== Just Three for Free! ===
Released: 2000

This book contains three stories: Playing Dead, In The Shower With Andy, and Runaway Pram.

=== Just Disgusting! ===
Released: 2002

The test for this book asks if readers pick their nose, wear the same undies two days in a row and wee in swimming pools, among other disgusting things.

=== Just Shocking! ===
Released: 2007

Following a short break in releases in the series, this book asks if "you wish you could drive around in a monster truck crushing everybody and everything that gets in your way" and if watching videos of people getting involved in accidents is funny.

=== Just Macbeth! ===
Released: 2009

Bell Shakespeare commissioned Griffiths in 2005 to adapt Macbeth by William Shakespeare to a younger audience and this book was the result. Bell Shakespeare then produced it for the stage in various performances across Australia.

=== Just Doomed! ===
Released: 2012

The "Doomed Test" asks if you have ever broken a mirror, walked under a ladder or opened an umbrella inside, among other superstitious things.
