= Terry Denton =

Australian author and illustrator (1950–2026)

- Denton in August 2018
- Born: Terence James Denton; 26 July 1950; Melbourne, Victoria, Australia
- Died: 21 September 2026 (aged 76); Mornington, Victoria, Australia
- Occupations: Author; illustrator artist
- Website: https://www.terrydenton.com.au/

Terence James Denton (26 July 1950 – 21 September 2026) was an Australian author, illustrator and artist. He wrote and illustrated more than 30 of his own books and illustrated numerous others for many notable Australian authors. His own books include the Gasp! series, which has been adapted into an animated TV series of the same name (and aired on Nine Network and ABC3). His art and designs contributed heavily to the style and stories of the children's TV series Lift Off. He is arguably best known for his illustrations of the “Just!” series written by Andy Griffiths.

== Career ==
Denton originally studied architecture but became "unhappy with that course". His website says that he tried his hand at animation, painting, theatre, etching, sculpture and cartooning, humorously adding horse whispering, iceberg building, and pterodactyl counseling.

Denton's first major picture story book, Felix and Alexander, won the 1986 Children's Book Council of Australia Picture Book of the Year award. Denton was also known for his illustrations in the Just! series of books, written by Andy Griffiths. Denton is perhaps best known for his artwork on the Treehouse series, also written by Griffiths, which has sold over 10 million copies in Australia. The 78-Storey Treehouse became the fastest-selling book in Australian history on its first day of sales in 2016.

Along with Griffiths, Denton was a noted supporter of the September 2019 climate strikes.

== Personal life and death ==
Denton was the second youngest of five boys and was born and grew up in Melbourne, Victoria. He was married and had three children.

Denton died in Mornington, Victoria, on 21 September 2026 at the age of 76.

== Works ==
=== As author and illustrator ===
- Felix and Alexander (1985)
- Gasp!
  - Gasp! (1996)
  - Zapt! (1997)
  - Splat! (1998)
  - Squish! (2005)
  - Crash! (2006)
  - Chomp! (2007)
- Storymaze
  1. The Ultimate Wave (2001)
  2. The Eye of Ulam (2001)
  3. The Wooden Cow (2002)
  4. The Golden Udder (2002)
  5. Minotaur's Maze (2003)
  6. The Obelisk of Eeeno (2003)
- It's True! Pigs Do Fly (2004)
- Squish! (2005)
- Wombat & Fox
  - Wombat & Fox: Tales of the City (2006)
  - Wombat & Fox: Summer in the City (2007)
  - Wombat & Fox: Thrillseekers (2009)
- Terry Denton's Really Truly Amazing Guide to Everything (2020)
- Bumper Books
  - Terry Denton's Bumper Book of the Universe (2014)
  - Terry Denton's Bumper Book of Silly Stuff to Do! (2022)
  - Terry Denton's Bumper Book of Holiday Stuff to Do! (2022)

=== With Andy Griffiths ===
Denton collaborated with writer Andy Griffiths to produce:

- The Day My Bum Went Psycho (2001)
- The Bad Book (2004)
- The Cat on the Mat Is Flat (2006)
- What Bumosaur is That? (2007)
- The Big Fat Cow That Goes Kapow (2008)
- The Very Bad Book (2010)
- What Body Part Is That? (2011)
- Once Upon A Slime (2013)
- The Cat, the Rat, and the Baseball Bat (2013)
- Ed and Ted and Ted's Dog Fred (2015)
- The Just! Books
  - Just Tricking! (1997)
  - Just Annoying! (1998)
  - Just Stupid! (1999)
  - Just Crazy! (2000)
  - Just Disgusting! (2002)
  - Just Wacky! (2004)
  - Just Shocking! (2007)
  - Just Macbeth! (2009)
  - Just Doomed! (2012)
- The Treehouse Series
  - Main series
    - The 13-Storey Treehouse (2011)
    - The 26-Storey Treehouse (2012)
    - The 39-Storey Treehouse (2013)
    - The 52-Storey Treehouse (2014)
    - The 65-Storey Treehouse (2015)
    - The 78-Storey Treehouse (2016)
    - The 91-Storey Treehouse (2017)
    - The 104-Storey Treehouse (2018)
    - The 117-Storey Treehouse (2019)
    - The 130-Storey Treehouse (2020)
    - The 143-Storey Treehouse (2021)
    - The 156-Storey Treehouse (2022)
    - The 169-Storey Treehouse (2023)
  - Extras
    - The Treehouse Fun Book (2016)
    - The Treehouse Fun Book 2 (2017)
    - Terry's Dumb Dot Story (2018)
    - The Treehouse Fun Book 3 (2018)
    - The Treehouse Joke Book (2019)
    - Little Treehouse series (2020)
    - The Treehouse Joke Book 2 (2021)
    - The Bumper Treehouse Fun Book (2021)
    - Treehouse Tales (2022)
    - Who's Who and What's Where in the Treehouse (2023)

=== Illustration ===
Books by Mem Fox:

- Night Noises (1989)
- A Particular Cow (2006)

Books by Mark Greenwood:

- Jandamarra (2013)
- Boomerang & Bat (2016)
- Moonwalkers (2020)

Books by Paul Jennings and Ted Greenwood:

- Spooner or Later (1992)
- Duck for Cover (1995)
- Freeze a crowd (1996)

Books by Alison Lloyd:

- Wicked Warriors and Evil Emperors (2010)
- Dragons, Devils and Rebels (2017)
- The Upside-Down History of Down Under (2019)

Books by Natalie Jane Prior:

- The Paw (1993)
- The Paw in Destination: Brazil (1995)
- The Paw in The Purple Diamond (1998)

Books by Gillian Rubinstein:

- Mr Plunkett's pool (1992)
- Jake and Pete (1995)
- Jake and Pete and the Stray Dogs (1997)
- Ducky's Nest (1999)
- Jake & Pete and the Catcrowbats (1999)
- Jake and Pete and the Magpie's Wedding (2002)

Books by Pamela Shrapnel:

- Meannie and the Min-Min (1987)
- Freddie the Frightened and the Wondrous Ms. Wardrobe (1988)

Other books:

- The Worm Who Knew Karate by Julie Lever (2015)
