= Andy Griffiths (author) =

Australian children's writer (born 1961)

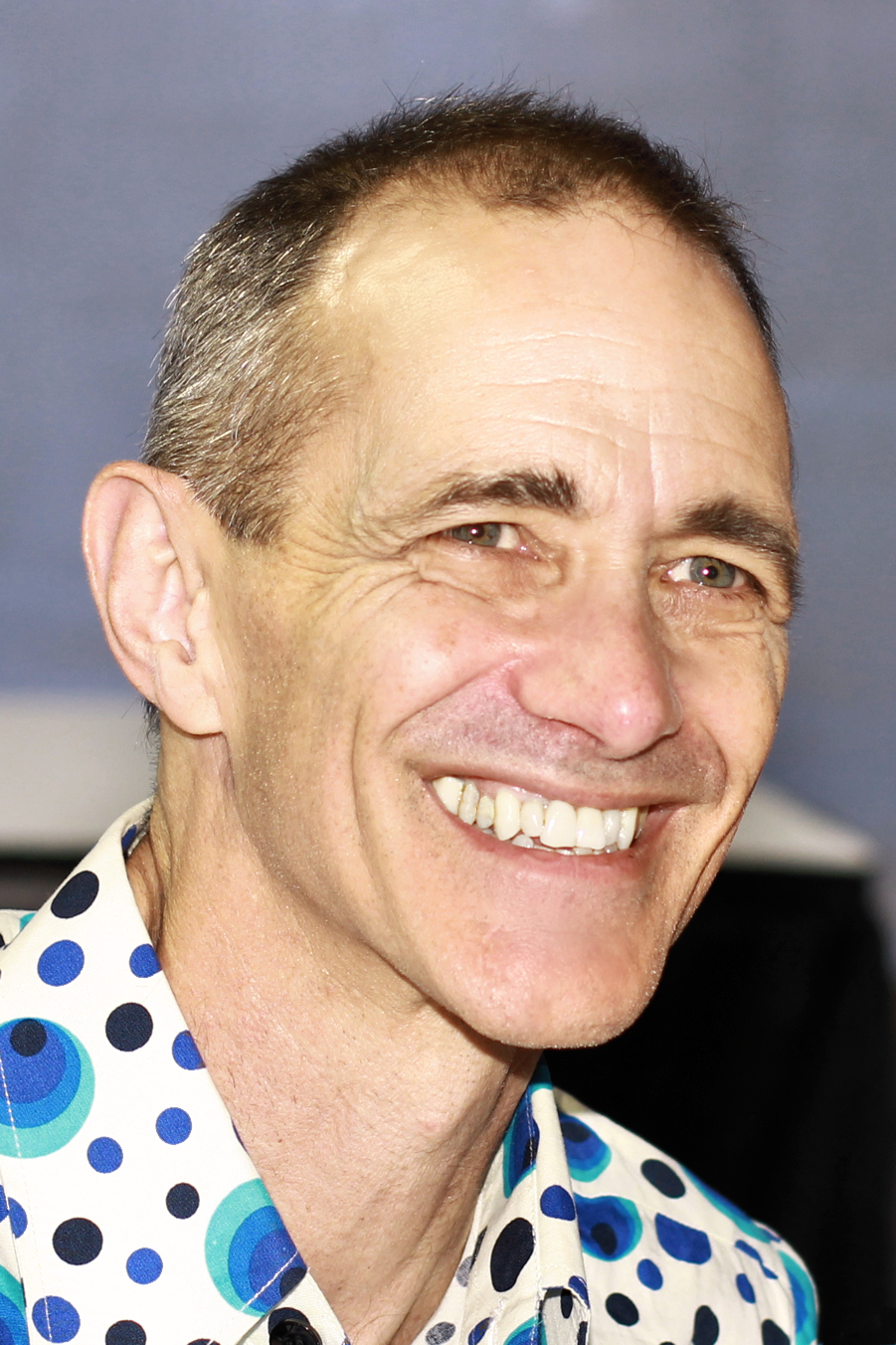
- Griffiths at the 2019 Texas Book Festival
- Born: Andy Griffiths; 3 September 1961 (age 65); Melbourne, Victoria, Australia
- Occupation: Author
- Spouse: Jill Griffiths
- Writing career
- Genres: Humour, children’s fiction
- Notable awards: Australian Children's Laureate, 2026–2027
- Website: www.andygriffiths.com.au

Andy Griffiths (born 3 September 1961) is an Australian children's author.

His books are published all over the world and include the Treehouse series, which has been adapted into several stage plays.

He is well known for working with Terry Denton. He is also notable for his Just! series, which was adapted into an animated television series called What's with Andy?, his novel The Day My Bum Went Psycho, which was also adapted into a television series.

His latest series, featuring YOU (the reader) and ME (the narrator) is illustrated by Bill Hope.

Griffiths was appointed the Australian Children's Laureate for 2026–2027. In the role he will travel around Australia and promote reading. His motto is "Reading is an Adventure".

== Early life ==
Andy was born and raised in Melbourne, Australia. He attended Pascoe Vale Primary School, Eastmont Primary School and later, Yarra Valley Grammar School.

Inspired by his love of reading he wrote and drew short stories and cartoons for his family and friends. In the fifth grade he purchased a typewriter at a second-hand stall at school and created his own humour magazine called ‘Popcorn’, which he sold for three cents a copy. He also was an English teacher and while teaching, he wrote books for his students.

In high school he began writing for the school's magazine and, inspired by punk/new wave music, wrote satirical songs and formed a band with his friends.

== Career ==
After graduating high school in 1979, he attended Monash University where he completed a BA with honours in English Literature, while at the same time gaining writing and performing experience as the front man for a number of experimental bands in Melbourne's vibrant alternative music scene centred around the Crystal Ballroom.

After completing a Diploma of Education at Rusden Teachers College (now Deakin University) in 1987, Andy became a high school teacher.

It was during this time as a teacher, that Andy began to write and self-publish collections of outlandish stories and cartoons in an attempt to inspire his students to embrace the fun and limitless possibilities of creative literature.

He eventually took leave from his job in 1991 and enrolled in a full-time Diploma of Professional Writing at Deakin University. It was during this period that he met and formed a partnership with like-minded illustrator Terry Denton.

== Advocacy ==
Andy is the Australian Children's Laureate 2026–2027. He is an ambassador for The Indigenous Literacy Foundation and the Pyjama Foundation, and was awarded the Dromkeen Medal in 2015 to honour his outstanding contribution to Australian children's literature.

== Books ==
=== The JUST! Series ===
Title	Year	Notes
Just Tricking!	1997	KOALA (Kids Own Australian Literature Awards) Winner Older Readers 2002; KROC (Kids Reading Oz Choice) First Most Popular 2001, Territory Kids’ Book of the Year 2005; YABBA (Young Australians Best Book Awards) Hall of Fame 2004
Just Annoying!	1998	CBCA (Children's Book Council of Australia) Notable Book 1999; KOALA (Kids Own Australian Literature Awards) Winner Older Readers 1999; YABBA (Young Australians Best Book Awards) Winner Younger Readers 1999
Just Stupid!	1999	YABBA (Young Australians Best Book Awards) Winner Younger Readers 2000; KOALA (Kids Own Australian Literature Awards) Winner Senior Readers 1999; KROC (Kids Reading Oz Choice) Most Popular 2002
Just Crazy!	2000	BILBY (Books I Loved Best Yearly) Winner; CYBER (Children's Yearly Best Ever Reads) Winner Younger Readers 2000, 2001, 2002; Younger Readers 2002, 2006; KOALA (Kids Own Australian Literature Awards) Winner Older Readers 2001; YABBA (Young Australians Best Book Awards) Winner Younger Readers 2001
Just Disgusting!	2002	BILBY (Books I Loved Best Yearly) Winner Younger Readers 2004; COOL (Canberra's Own Outstanding List) Winner Older Readers 2003; KOALA (Kids Own Australian Literature Awards) Winner Older Readers 2003; KROC (Kids Reading Oz Choice) Most Popular Book 2003; YABBA (Young Australians Best Book Awards) Winner Older Readers 2003
Just Shocking	2007	BILBY (Books I Loved Best Yearly) Winner Younger Readers 2008; COOL (Canberra's Own Outstanding List) Winner Younger Readers 2008; KOALA (Kids Own Australian Literature Awards) Winner Younger Readers 2008; KROC (Kids Reading Oz Choice) Winner Younger Readers 2008; WAYBRA (West Australian Young Readers’ Book Award) Winner Younger Readers 2008
Just Macbeth!	2009	Helpmann Awards Nominee: Best Australian Work 2009; Helpmann Awards Nominee: Best Presentation for Children 2009; Prime Minister's Literary Awards Shortlist: Children's Fiction 2010
Just Doomed!	2012	

=== The Treehouse Series ===
Title	Year	Notes
The 13-Storey Treehouse	2011	ABIA (Australian Book Industry Award) Book of the Year for Older Children 2012; COOL (Canberra's Own Outstanding List) 2012; KOALA (Kids Own Australian Literature Awards) Winner Fiction for Older Readers 2012; Sainsburys Children’ Book Award 2015 (UK); Lancashire Fantastic Book Award 2016 (UK); Coventry Inspiration Award 2016 (UK); WAYBRA (West Australian Young Readers’ Book Award) Winner Younger Readers 2012; YABBA (Young Australians Best Book Awards) 2012
The 26-Storey Treehouse	2012	ABIA (Australian Book Industry Award) Book of the Year for Older Children 2013; BILBY (Books I Loved Best Yearly) Winner Older Readers 2013; COOL (Canberra's Own Outstanding List) Winner Older Readers 2013; KOALA (Kids Own Australian Literature Awards) Winner Older Readers 2013; YABBA (Young Australians Best Book Awards) Winner Older Readers 2013
The 39-Storey Treehouse	2013	ABIA (Australian Book Industry Award) Book of the Year for Older Children 2014; COOL (Canberra's Own Outstanding List) Winner Older Readers 2014; KOALA (Kids Own Australian Literature Awards) Winner Older Readers 2014; KROC (Kids Reading Oz Choice Awards) Best Fiction for Older Readers 2014; WAYBRA (West Australian Young Readers’ Book Award) Winner Younger Readers 2014; YABBA (Young Australians Best Book Awards) Winner Older Readers 2014
The 52-Storey Treehouse	2014	ABIA (Australian Book Industry Award) Book of the Year 2015; ABIA (Australian Book Industry Award) Book of the Year for Younger Children 2015; BILBY (Books I Loved Best Yearly) Winner Younger Readers 2015; KOALA (Kids Own Australian Literature Awards) Winner Older Readers 2015; WAYBRA (West Australian Young Readers’ Book Award) Winner Younger Readers 2015; YABBA (Young Australians Best Book Awards) Winner Older Readers 2015
The 65-Storey Treehouse	2015	ABIA (Australian Book Industry Award) Book of the Year for Younger Children 2016; BILBY (Books I Loved Best Yearly) Winner Younger Readers 2016; CBCA (Children's Book Council of Australia) Notable Book for Younger Readers 2016; KOALA (Kids Own Australian Literature Awards) Winner Older Readers 2016; WAYBRA (West Australian Young Readers’ Book Award) Winner Younger Readers 2016; YABBA (Young Australians Best Book Awards) Winner Older Readers 2016
The 78-Storey Treehouse	2016	ABIA (Australian Book Industry Award) Book of the Year for Younger Children 2017; ABIA (Australian Book Industry Award) Audiobook of the Year 2017; BILBY (Books I Loved Best Yearly) Winner Younger Readers 2017; KOALA (Kids Own Australian Literature Awards) Winner Older Readers 2017; YABBA (Young Australians Best Book Awards) Winner Older Readers 2017
The 91-Storey Treehouse	2017	ABIA (Australian Book Industry Award) Audiobook of the Year 2018; BILBY (Books I Loved Best Yearly) Winner Older Readers 2018; KOALA (Kids Own Australian Literature Awards) Winner Older Readers 2018; YABBA (Young Australians Best Book Awards) Winner Older Readers reviews 2018
The 104-Storey Treehouse	2018	ABIA (Australian Book Industry Award) Book of the Year for Younger Children 2019; KOALA (Kids Own Australian Literature Awards) Winner Older Readers 2019; YABBA (Young Australians Best Book Awards) Winner Older Readers 2019
The 117-Storey Treehouse	2019	ABIA (Australian Book Industry Award) Book of the Year for Younger Children 2020; KOALA (Kids Own Australian Literature Awards) Winner Older Readers 2020; YABBA (Young Australians Best Book Awards) Winner Older Readers 2020
The 130-Storey Treehouse	2020	KOALA (Kids Own Australian Literature Awards) Winner Older Readers 2021; WAYBRA (West Australian Young Readers’ Book Award) Winner Younger Readers 2021; YABBA (Young Australians Best Book Awards) Winner Older Readers 2021
The 143-Storey Treehouse	2021	KOALA (Kids Own Australian Literature Awards) Winner Older Readers 2022; KROC (Kids Reading Oz Choice) Winner Older Readers 2022; YABBA (Young Australians Best Book Awards) Winner Older Readers 2022
The 156-Storey Treehouse	2022	
The 169-Storey Treehouse	2023	
==== Treehouse Extras ====
Treehouse Tales: 13 tales too silly to be told until now	2022	
Who's Who and What's Where in the Treehouse	2023	
The Treehouse Joke Book	2019	
The Treehouse Joke Book 2	2021	
The Treehouse Fun Book	2016	
The Treehouse Fun Book 2	2017	
The Treehouse Fun Book 3	2018	
The Treehouse Bumper Fun Book	2021	
Little Treehouse Books: Barky the Barking Dog	2015	
Little Treehouse Books: Ten Unlucky Pirates	2015	
The 13-Storey Treehouse full-colour anniversary edition	2021	
The 26-Storey Treehouse full-colour edition	2023	
The 39-Storey Treehouse full-colour edition	2024	
The 52-Storey Treehouse full-colour edition	2025	

=== YOU & ME Series ===
Title	Year	Notes
YOU & ME and the Land of Lost Things	2024	REAL Awards 2026 Fictions for Younger Readers shortlist
YOU & ME and the Peanut Butter Beast	2025	
YOU & ME and the Gigantic Knucklehead	2026	

=== The Bum Trilogy ===
Title	Year	Notes
The Day My Bum Went Psycho	2001	Bookseller's Choice Award Shortlisted Book of the Year 2001; YABBA (Young Australians Best Book Awards) Winner Older Readers 2002; YARA (Young Australian Readers Award) Older Readers Award 2001
Zombie Bums from Uranus	2003	KOALA (Kids Own Australian Literature Awards) Winner Older Readers 2007
Bumageddon: The final pongflict	2005	

=== Early readers ===
Title	Year	Notes
The Cat on the Mat is Flat	2006	BILBY (Books I loved Best Yearly) Winner Younger Readers 2007; CBCA (Children's Book Council of Australia) Shortlisted Book of the Year Younger Readers 2007; COOL (Canberra's Own Outstanding List) Winner Younger Readers 2007; KOALA (Kids Own Australian Literature Awards) Winner Younger Readers 2007; KROC (Kids Reading Oz Choice) Most popular Younger Readers 2007; YABBA (Young Australians Best Book Awards) Winner Younger Readers 2007
The Big Fat Cow that Goes Kapow	2006	COOL (Canberra's Own Outstanding List) Winner Younger Readers 2010; KOALA (Kids Own Australian Literature Awards) Winner Younger Readers 2010; KROC (Kids Reading Oz Choice) Most popular Younger Readers 2010; YABBA (Young Australians Best Book Awards) Winner Younger Readers 2010

=== NON-Information Books ===
Title	Year
What Body Part is That?	2011
What Bumosaur is That?	2007

=== Schooling Around Series ===
Title	Year	Notes
Treasure Fever	2008	YABBA (Young Australians Best Book Awards) Hall of Fame 2011
Pencil of Doom	2008	YABBA (Young Australians Best Book Awards) Hall of Fame 2011
Mascot Madness	2009	WAYBRA (West Australian Young Readers’ Book Award) Winner Younger Readers 2010; YABBA (Young Australians Best Book Awards) Hall of Fame 2011
Robot Riot	2009	YABBA (Young Australians Best Book Awards) Hall of Fame 2011

=== Activity Books ===
Title	Year
LET'S GO! Stories to Write, Stories to Draw, Stories to Read, Adventures Galore	2026
Once upon a Slime: 45 ways to get writing ... fast!	2013

== TV & Theatre adaptations ==
Year	Show title	Producer	No. of seasons
2001–2007	What's With Andy?	CinéGroupe	3
2013–2015	The Day My Butt Went Psycho	Nelvana, Studio Moshi & Brain Bender Pty Ltd	2

Theatre

- Just Macbeth! (2008) Bell Shakespeare Company (2008–2010)
- The 13-Storey Treehouse CDP Theatre Company
- The 26-Storey Treehouse CDP Theatre Company
- The 52-Storey Treehouse CDP Theatre Company
- The 78-Storey Treehouse CDP Theatre Company
- The 91-Storey Treehouse CDP Theatre Company
- YOU & ME and the Land of Lost Things CDP Theatre Company
