= The Sign of the Seahorse =

1992 book by Graeme Base

- Author: Graeme Base
- Illustrator: Graeme Base
- Language: English
- Subject: Seahorses
- Genre: Children's literature
- Published: 1992
- Publisher: Harry N. Abrams Inc.
- Publication place: United States
- Media type: Print (hardcover, paperback)
- Pages: 44 pages
- ISBN: 0810938251
- Preceded by: The Eleventh Hour
- Followed by: The Discovery of Dragons

The Sign of the Seahorse is a 1992 illustrated children's book by Graeme Base. It was first published on September 15, 1992, through Harry N. Abrams Inc., and was later adapted into a film and musical. The book received a first printing of 350,000 copies and was an alternative selection of the Literary Guild and the Doubleday Book Club.

Base was inspired to write the book during a scuba diving experience in Martinique, after which point he began researching fish and started pursuing underwater photography.

== Synopsis ==
The book's story is composed of two acts and is set in the underwater town of Reeftown, where its fishy inhabitants live peacefully with each other. However one of them, Gropmund Grouper, is intent on fulfilling his own greedy needs at the expense of everyone else - even if this requires polluting the entire area. This pollution has far reaching effects and forces Corporal Bert of the Soldiercrabs to leave behind his sweetheart Pearl Trout while he tries to find the source of the pollution - unaware that his departure will also cause Pearl to do her own investigating.

== Reception ==
Critical reception for The Sign of the Seahorse has been positive and the book has been used as part of many educational lessons, such as helping to explain concept and vocabulary development. Kirkus Reviews wrote "All of this is related in interminable, relentlessly rhythmic doggerel—peppered with clever turns of phrase, but not enough to spice this abundant fish stew. ... At least as imaginative as—and less earnest than—Gurney's Dinotopia, and illustrated with greater skill; there's also the ecological message." while Publishers Weekly describes it as a "Gilbert and Sullivan–like coral reef tale" and refers to "Base's exemplary verse, perfect scansion and witty rhymes" but "youngsters may have difficulty here: the tale is lengthy for a picture-book audience, and the artwork's largesse might prove overwhelming." They concluded "The verse makes splendid read-aloud material, however; nightly recitations of the various scenes should keep both reader and audience immensely entertained."

The book was also used by the Leigh Yawkey Woodson Art Museum as part of a program to help educate children about pollution and the environment and has been part of academic research.

Kids' Book Review has praised the book for its story and artwork, something echoed in People's review of the work.
