= Christmas window =

Window display for the Christmas shopping season

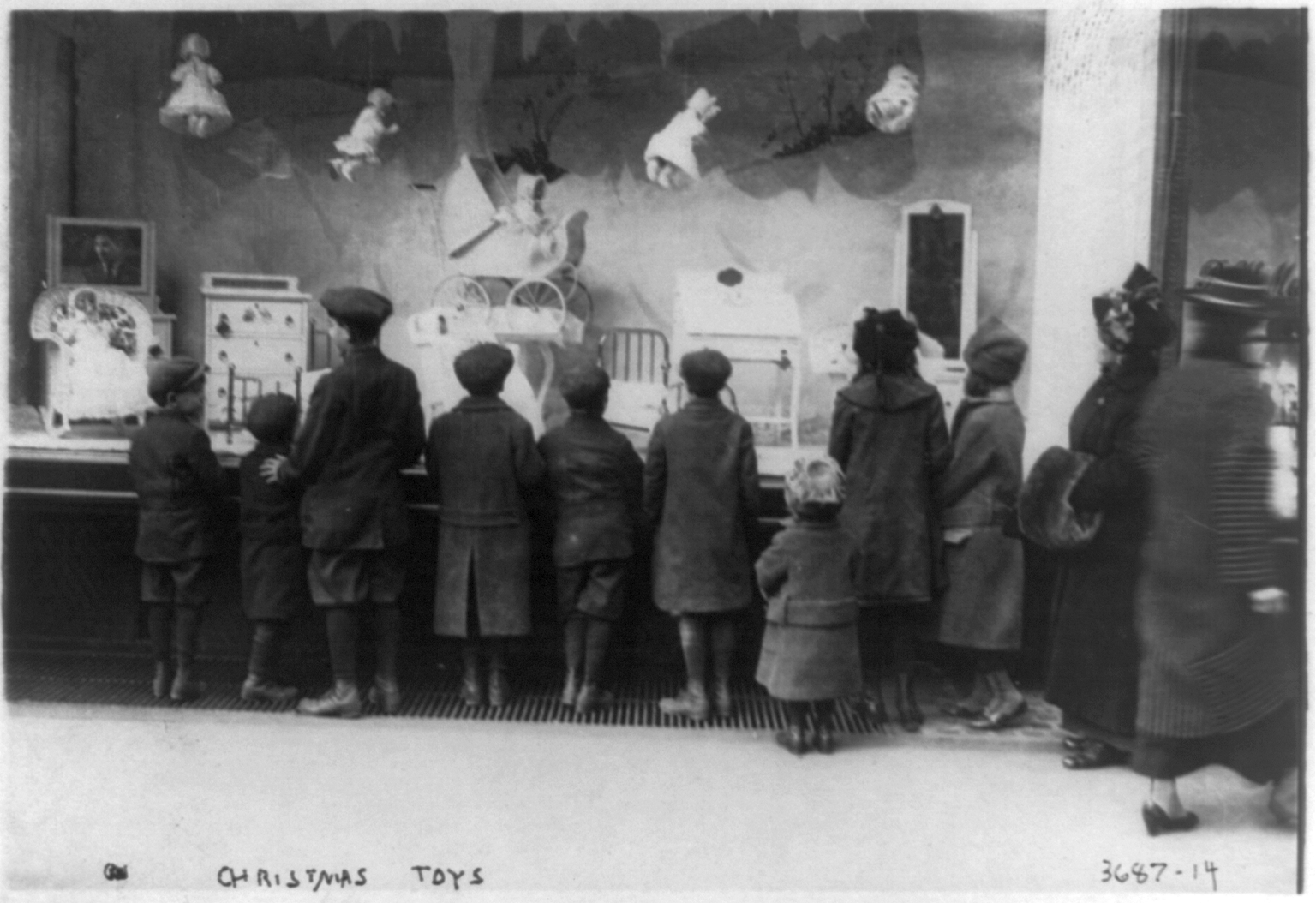
Children gazing through Macy's window in New York City in the early 20th century

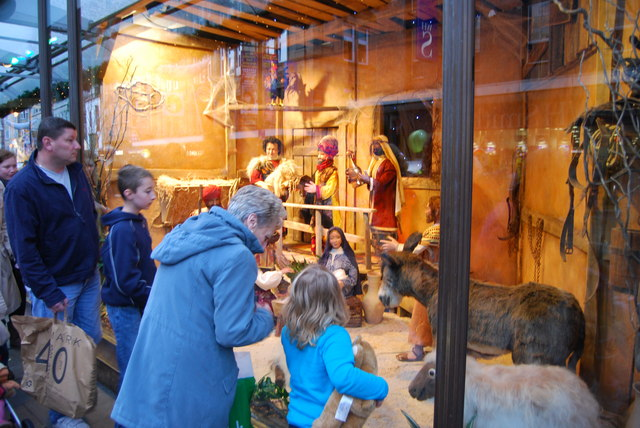
Fenwick Christmas 2009 window

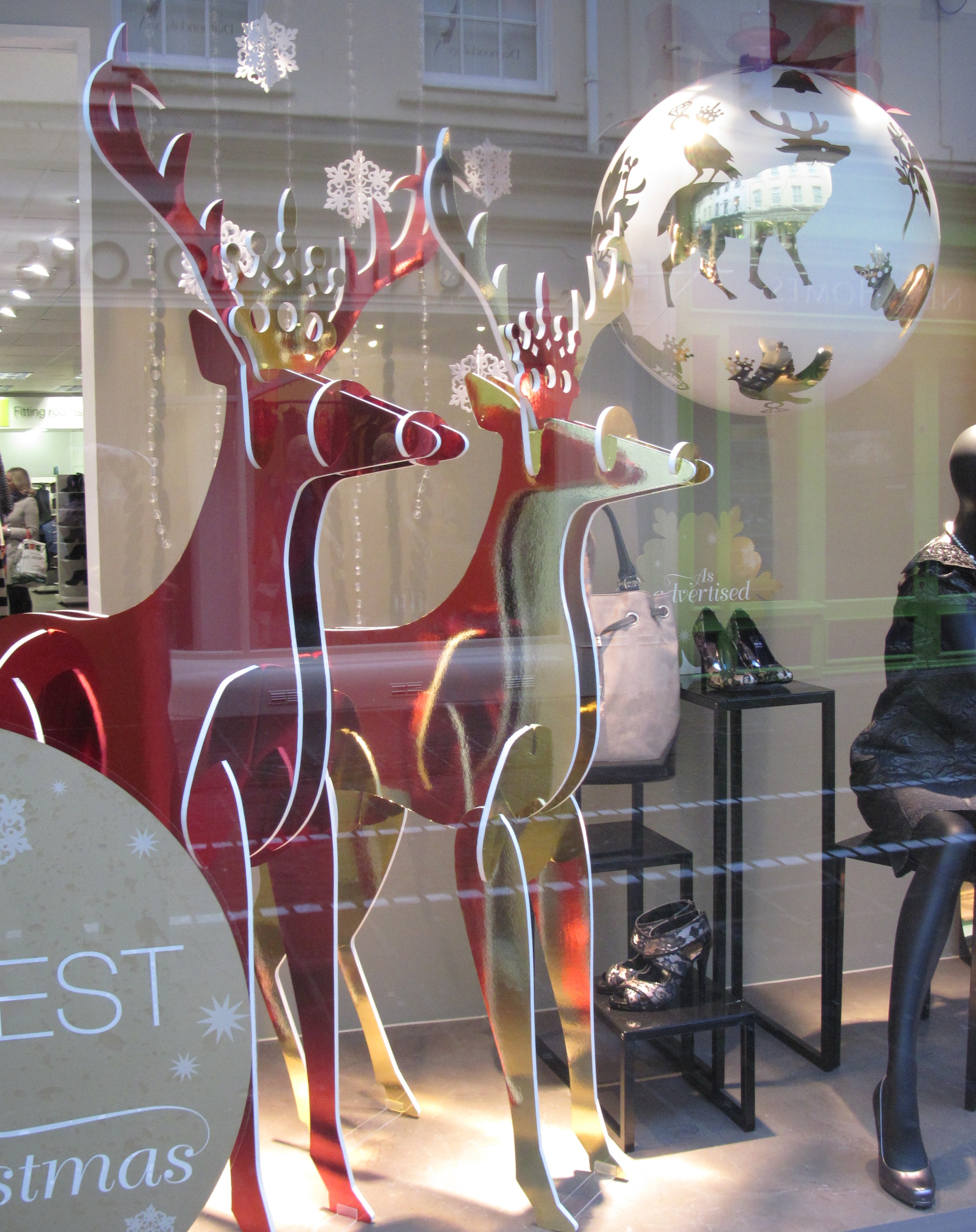
In Saint Helier, Jersey

A Christmas window is a special window display prepared for the Christmas shopping season at department stores and other retailers. Some retailers around the world have become noted for their Christmas window displays, with some becoming tourist attractions. Christmas windows are sometimes thematic and may include animatronics.

== North America ==
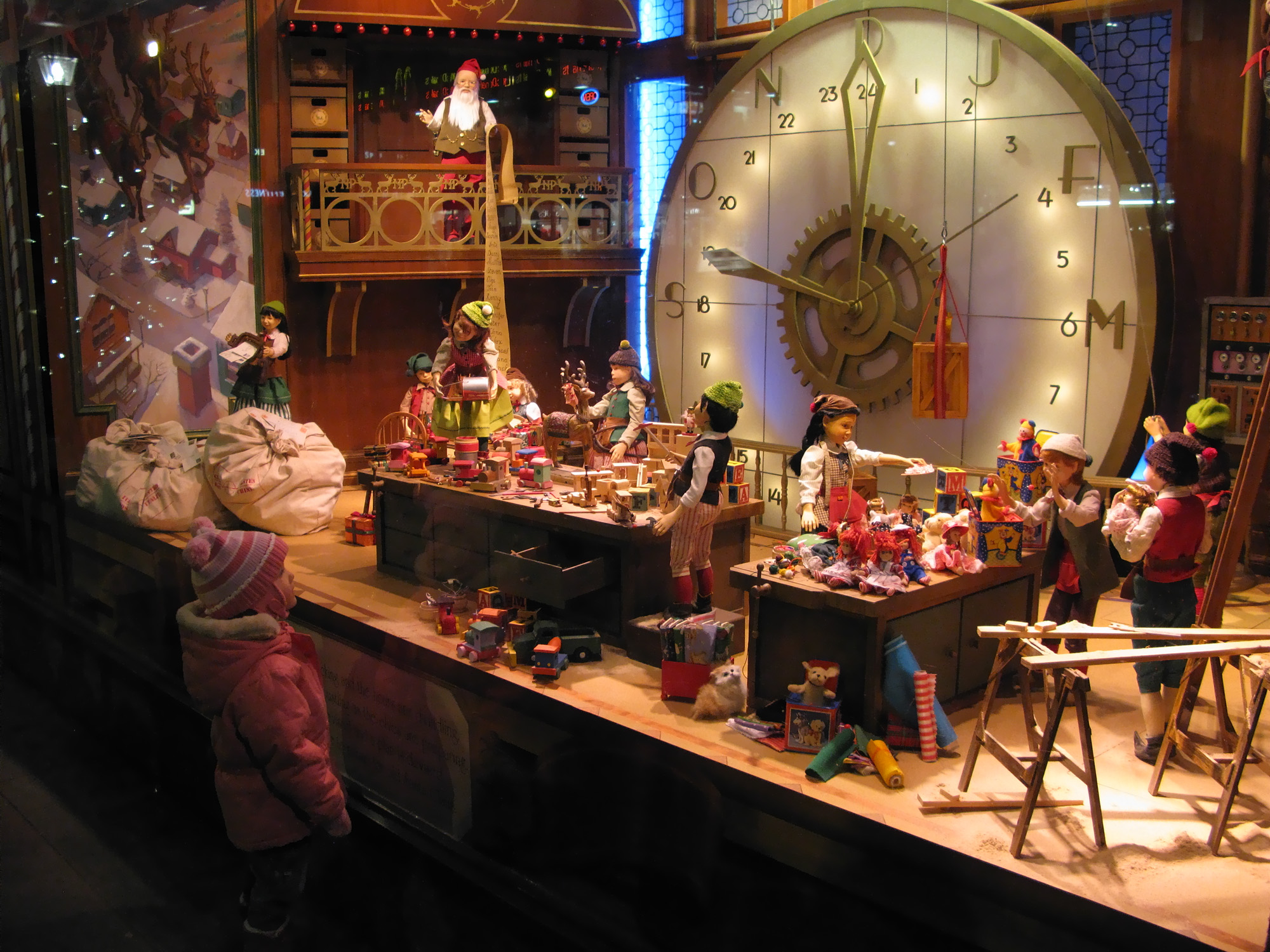
In Downtown Toronto, Ontario, Canada

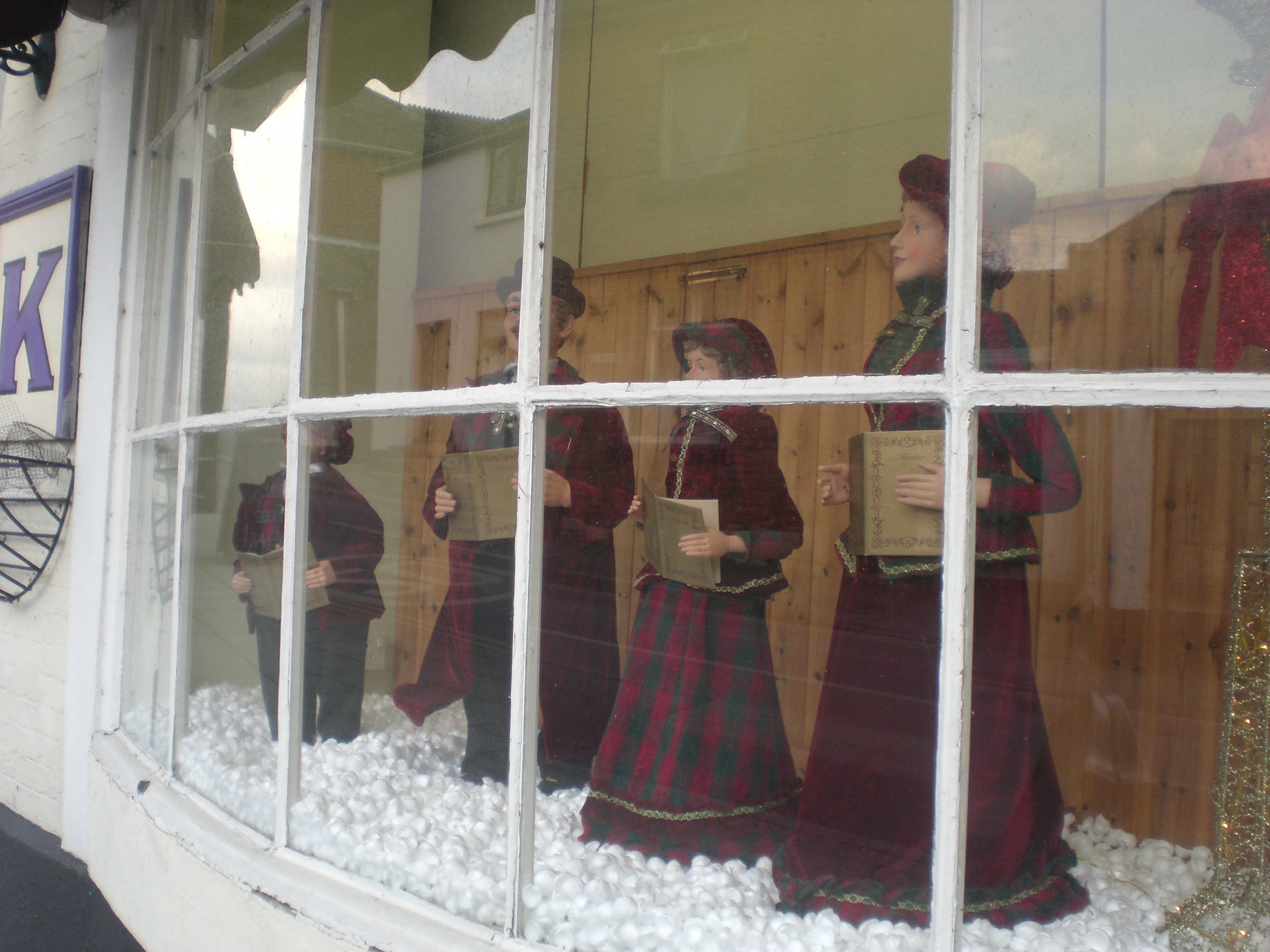
Christmas Carol singers on display in Brading, Isle of Wight

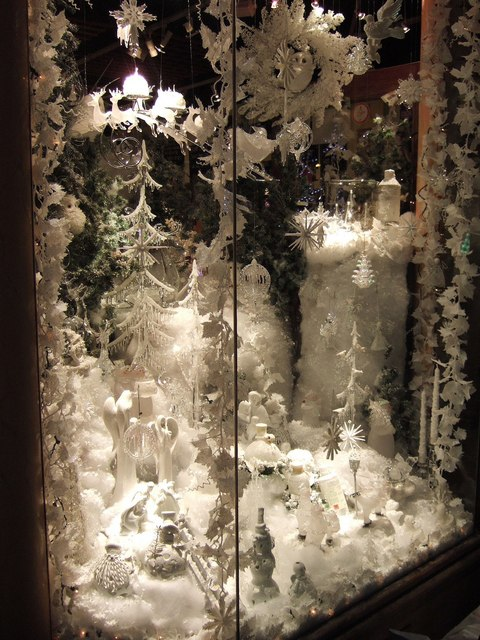
Torquay Candle Company Christmas window on Fleet Walk

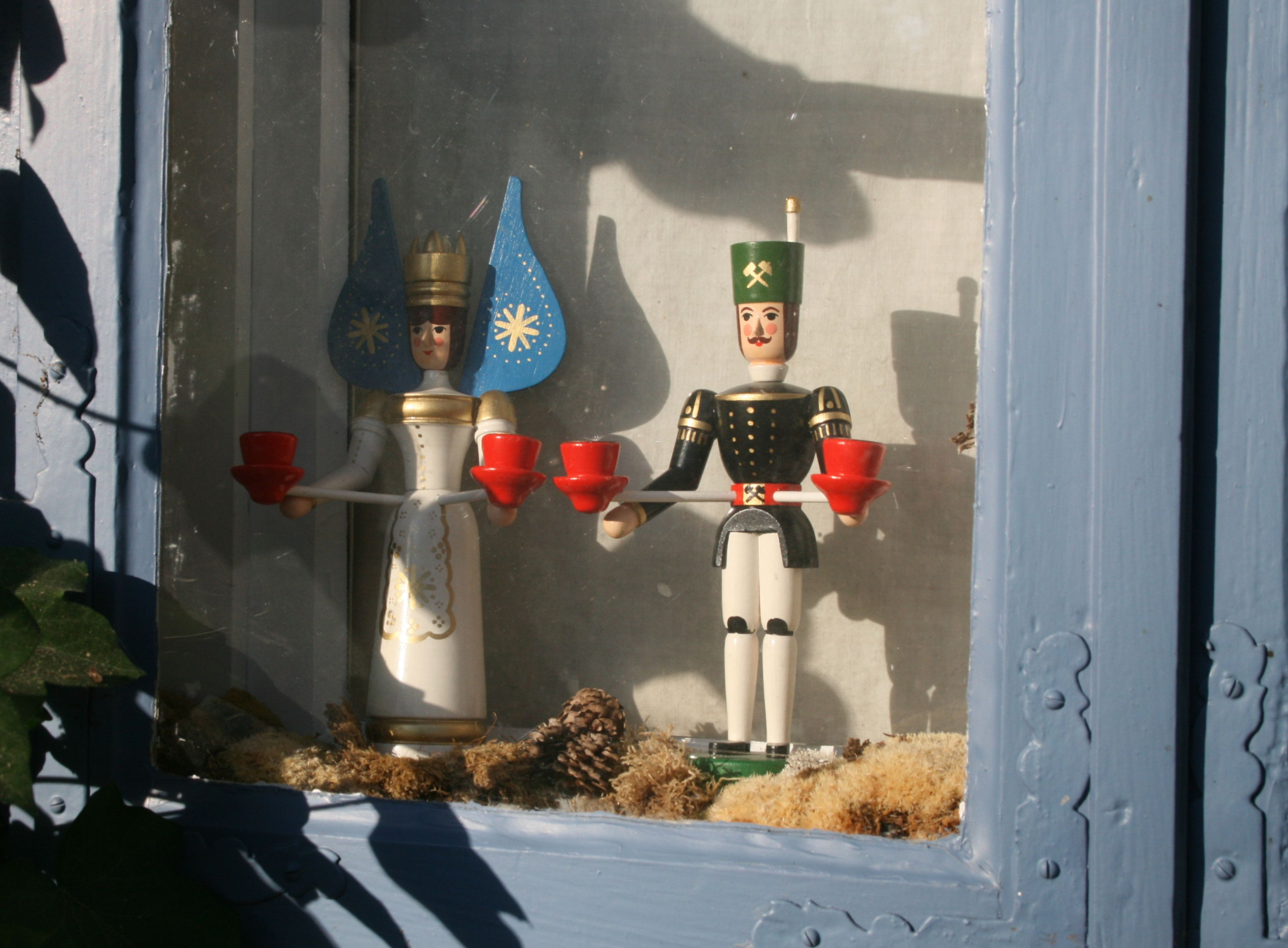
"Fenster mit Bethenmoos" Ore Mountain folk art display

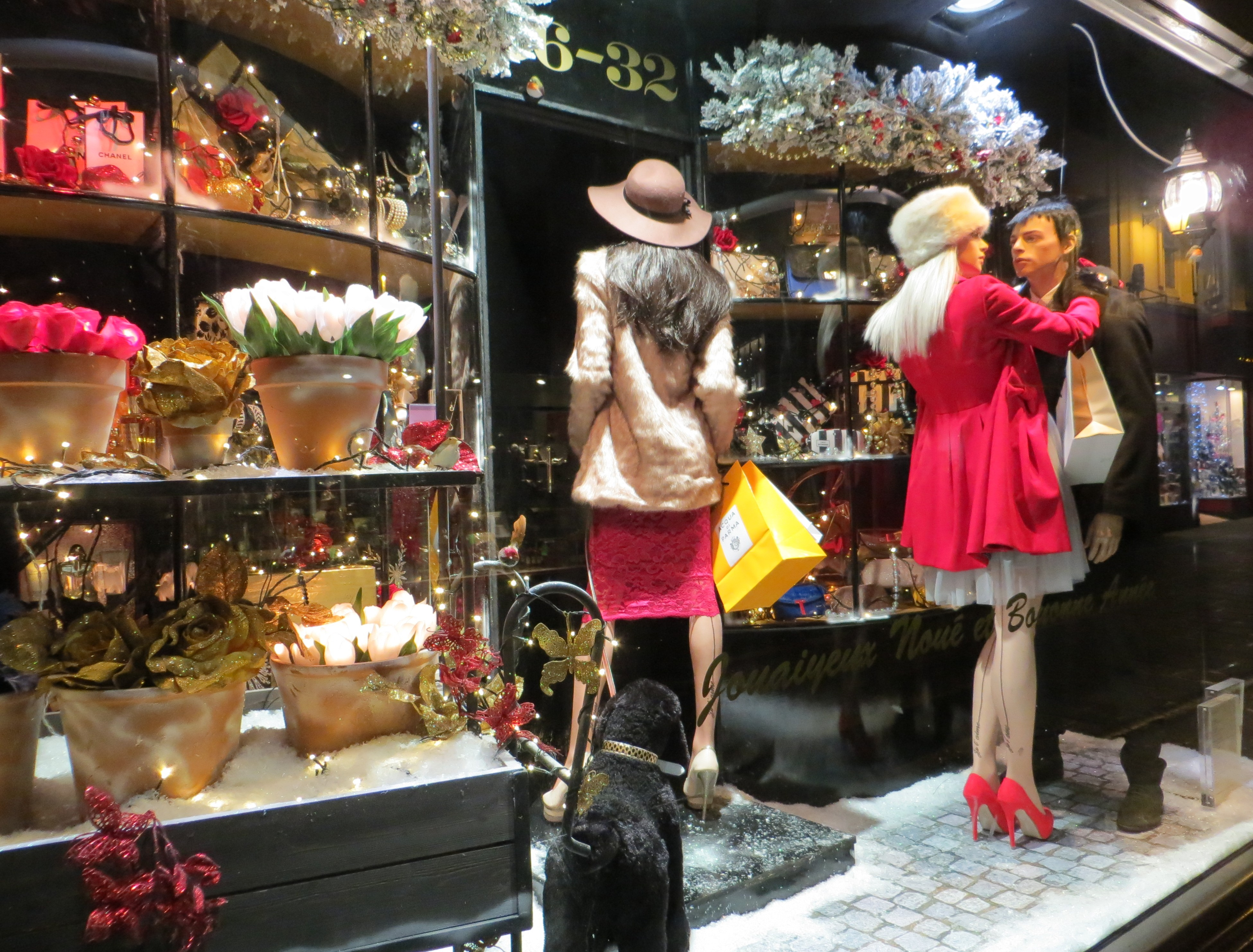
"Fête dé Noué, 2013"

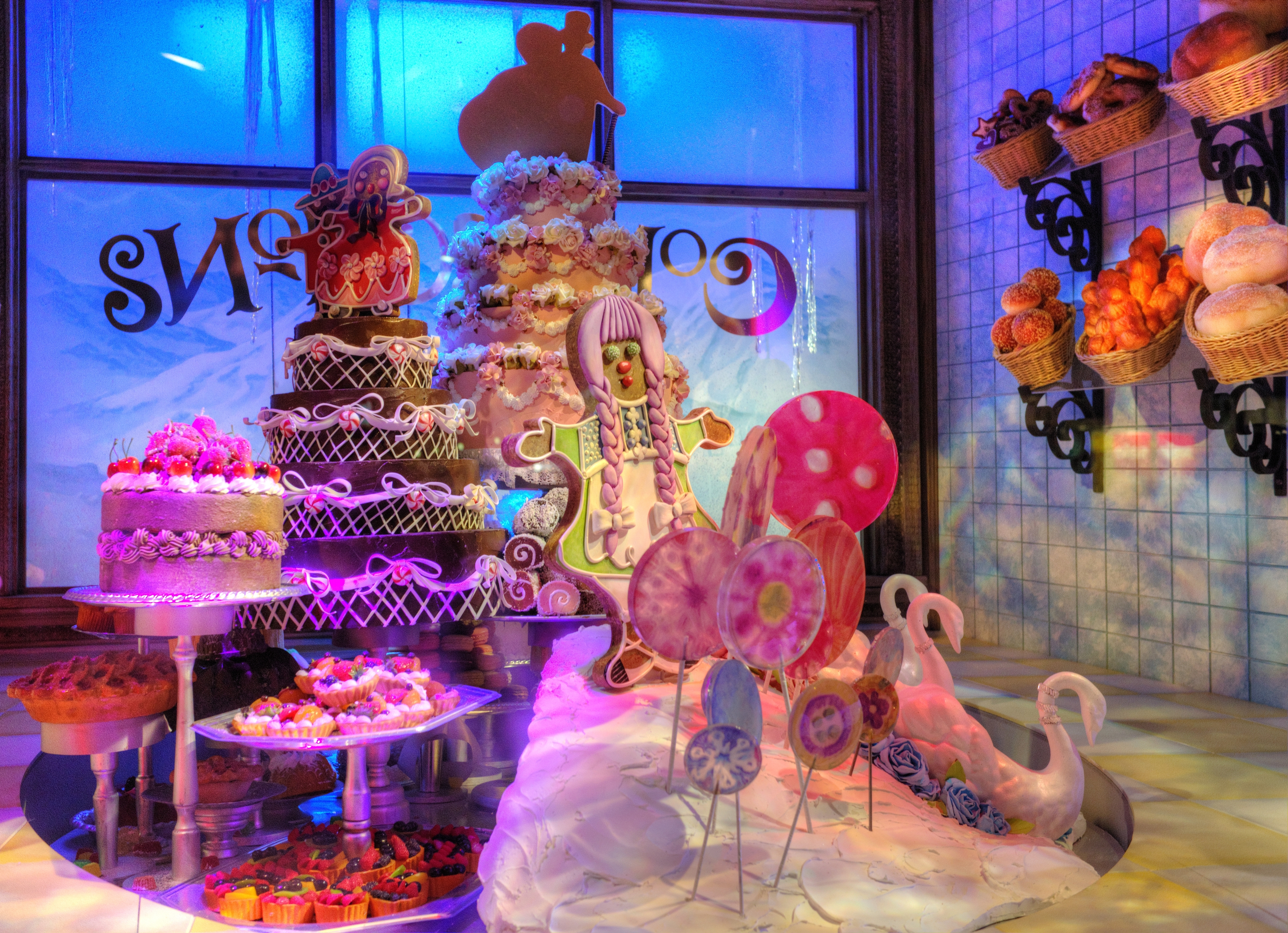
Myer's animatronic display

Several retailers in New York City attract shoppers and tourists to their Christmas window displays, including Macy's and Lord & Taylor. Macy's established the practice at its New York City store when it debuted an animated shop window in 1883.

At Christmastime, it is often Spaeth Design that is behind the windows and store displays of many of the nation's major retailers, as well as the lobby displays of some of New York's major hotels and office buildings: the Palace, the Harley, the St. Moritz and the Park Lane hotels, and the Park Avenue Plaza and Gulf and Western office buildings.

— Sandra Salmans, New York Times

AM&A's flagship department store in Buffalo, New York was known locally for its Victorian Christmas windows. Auction internet company Chartitybuzz auctioned the experience of watching Simon Doonan create the Barney's Christmas windows to benefit Christie's Green Auction in 2010 with a final bid received for $60,000. Kaufmann's offered Christmas windows and Santa Land.

Fees were charged to see Lonnie Hanzon's Christmas window display 12/25: A Holiday Store in Omaha in 1987.

Until it closed in 1989, Altman's was known for its Christmas window displays that rivaled Lord & Taylor's, a few blocks up on Fifth Avenue. In Pittsburgh, Horne's was one of the retailers known for its Christmas window displays. In Boston, Filene's would hold a Christmas tree lighting and Jordan Marsh would present a series festive Christmas window displays known as the "Enchanted Village". The window display has since relocated to Boston's Hynes Convention Center, and then to City Hall Plaza.

In Montreal, James Aird Nesbitt was in charge of the traditional Christmas window displays at the Ogilvy department store. In 1947, he commissioned German toymaker Steiff to create two animated holiday scenes known as "The Mill in the Forest" and "The Enchanted Village". The displays included dozens of handcrafted mechanical toy animals and more than a hundred moveable parts. In 2008, the displays were refurbished. Woodward's Department Store in Vancouver's retail shopping district was also known for its Christmas window displays.

== Europe ==
Tom Keogh designed the annual Christmas windows for Galeries Lafayette department store in Paris during the late 1940s and early 1950s.

The Fenwick (department store) in Newcastle is known locally for its Christmas window display. Since 1971 there has been a Christmas display in the shop's windows, and people come from near and far to look at them. There are records going back to the 1930s to indicate that displays have been done. The 2009 theme was a traditional nativity scene, differing from the 2002 aliens theme ("Christmas in Another World") which showed aliens celebrating Christmas and sparked discussion in the letters page of the local papers. The Arab dress provoked some debate. The commentators may not have been familiar with the location of Bethlehem. In 2011, the store held the 40th anniversary of the store's Christmas window display tradition. The store is best known for its extravagant windows, filled with detailed sets and sophisticated moving figures, which appears every Christmas and almost rivals the windows in Liberty's. The themes are taken mainly from fairy tales and children's stories. The figures move and are accompanied by music.

In 2011, Anthony Ausgang designed the Christmas windows for the La Rinascente Department Store in Milan with larger-than-life three-dimensional models of his trademark psychedelic cartoon cats. Bertrand Planes designed Christmas window displays for Le Bon Marché in Paris.

== Australia ==
In Australia, Sydney department store David Jones presents an annual animated Christmas Window display. Traditionally these have often featured snowy northern hemisphere Christmas scenarios, but in 2014 the windows are set in a distinctly Australian summer, featuring beach and rainforest scenes, based on the book "Reindeer's Christmas Surprise" by Australian author Ursula Dubosarsky and illustrator Sue De Gennaro.

In Melbourne, the Myer department store began presenting an annual Christmas window display in 1956, and later added the annual Myer Christmas Parade. Displays have typically included scenes from Christmas related stories such as "The 12 Days of Christmas", A Christmas Carol and How the Grinch Stole Christmas! as well as nativity scenes and scenes from children's stories and fairy tales. For the past few decades, displays have featured animated characters. Uno's Garden was chosen as the theme of the 2007 Myer Christmas Windows in Melbourne and Brisbane.

== Pop culture ==
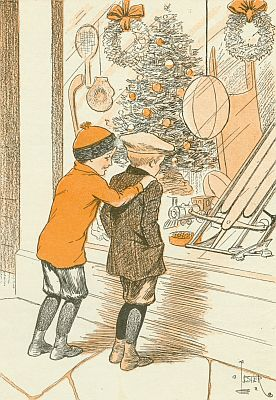
Book cover from the 1916 children's novel Christmas Holidays at Merryvale, illustrated by Charles F. Lester

The 1947 film Miracle on 34th Street and 1983 film A Christmas Story feature Christmas window displays.

The book cover of the 1916 children's novel Christmas Holidays at Merryvale by Alice Hale Burnett features children peering into a Christmas window.

== See also ==
- Christmas worldwide
- Window shopping
- WindowsWear
