= Truck Dogs =

Novel by Graeme Base

Truck Dogs: A Novel in Four Bites
- Author: Graeme Base
- Language: English
- Publication date: 2003
- Publication place: Australia

Truck Dogs: A Novel in Four Bites is a children's adventure/science fiction novel by Australian author Graeme Base, who is famous for his large picture books such as Animalia. It was published in 2003 and nominated for a CBCA 2004 Book of the Year for younger readers. The novel is supposed to take place in the future, but the setting is ultimately a fantasy world based on a rural desert town (as in the Australian outback or the western United States). All of the characters are caricaturized, anthropomorphic dogs of various breeds, part biological and part machine. Their lower bodies are formed by the chassis and wheels of some kind of modern vehicle, often a truck.

The story follows a young dog-vehicle who longs for adventure. He befriends a group of rebellious adolescent dog-vehicles (who are disliked by the citizens of the small town where they live) and an old loner mechanic. They have to choose where they stand when a renegade gang arrives and attempts to steal the town's precious gasoline resources and threatens harm.

The novel includes numerous color plates illustrated by Base picturing the characters and their individual make and model. Base introduces the novel as if it had been told to him by his dog.

== Origins ==
The author states that the main idea for the novel was derived from his childhood observations on the "animal intensity" of trucks and other fast-moving vehicles. During the writing process, the novel had many earlier incarnations, such as a prose picture book, a picture book in the form of a poem, and a screenplay.

== Critical response ==
A La Trobe University review of the book is positive overall, stating that it is entertaining with a straightforward storyline and linear plot. The DarkEcho review notes that, since none of the dog/vehicle hybrids or other inhabitants (truck bugs, truck sheep) have limbs, one wonders how they are able to perform the more delicate tasks of running a town.
