= Animalia (TV series) =

- Based on: Animalia by illustrator Graeme Base
- Developed by: Graeme Base; Tom Ruegger; Ewan Burnett; Doug MacLeod; Robyn Base; Bruce D. Johnson
- Written by: Sherri Stoner; John P. McCann; Deanna Oliver; Tom Ruegger; Nicholas Hollander; Mark Seidenberg; John K. Ludin; John Loy
- Directed by: David Scott
- Voices of: Brooke Anderson; Katie Leigh; Robert Mark Klein; Kate Higgins; Dean O'Gorman; Chris Hobbs; Peta Johnson
- Theme music composer: Graeme Base; Yuri Worontschak
- Opening theme: "Welcome to Animalia" by Boys Like Girls (PBS Kids Go! version only)
- Ending theme: "Welcome to Animalia" (instrumental) (PBS Kids Go! version only)
- Composer: Christopher Elves
- Countries of origin: Australia; United States
- Original language: English
- No. of series: 2
- No. of episodes: 40

Production
- Executive producers: Graeme Base; Tom Ruegger; Ewan Burnett; Murray Pope; Bruce D. Johnson
- Producers: Ewan Burnett; Murray Pope
- Editor: Tom Ruegger
- Running time: 24 minutes
- Production companies: Burberry Productions; Animalia Productions; PorchLight Entertainment

Original release
- Network: Network Ten (Australia); PBS Kids Go! (United States)
- Release: 11 November 2007 – 7 November 2008

Animalia is an animated children's television series based on the 1986 picture book of the same name by illustrator Graeme Base. The series premiered on Network Ten in Australia on 11 November 2007, airing two seasons before ending on 7 November 2008.

== Premise ==
The series tells the story of two human children, Alex and his friend Zoe, who stumble into the magical library which transports them to the animal-inhabited world of Animalia. Strange events have undermined the Animalian civilization, and Alex and Zoe join forces with their new friends G'Bubu the gorilla and Iggy the iguana to save Animalia from evil and comical villains.

== Characters ==
=== Humans ===
- Alex (voiced by Brooke Mikey Anderson) is a 12-year-old artist who is hardly ever seen without a sketchbook and pencil. He keeps a cool level head and is rather enthusiastic with a sense of adventure; he's also athletic and can jump very well. His ability to see forgotten portals that can transport anyone anywhere in Animalia is what makes him special.
- Zoe (voiced by Katie Leigh) is a sassy and smart-mouthed but benevolent and jolly 12-year old girl. Zoe met Alex by accident where she followed him to the world of Animalia. Despite a rocky start, she found a friend in Alex, who she refers to as "Sketch Boy." She is a very good storyteller, as evidenced in "Over and Beyond".
- Stanley is the librarian of the Metro Library. He is Livingstone's human counterpart, and a close friend to him.
- Emma is Zoe's friend. Although she is not shown on-screen, she is heard in Zoe's PDA when she is calling her.

=== Animalians ===
- G'Bubu (voiced by Chris Hobbs) is a green-furred Western lowland gorilla who lives in his treehouse home with his best friend Iggy. G'Bubu is fun-loving and enjoys monkeying around. Despite this, he still has a sense of acumen, be it about Animalia or his family tree.
- Iggy (voiced by Robert Mark Klein) is a Mexican-accented iguana with a slightly excitable personality. He thinks himself to be bigger than anyone else, but always gets ahead of himself. He and G'Bubu were the first to befriend Alex and Zoe when they first arrived and are always on hand to help their new friends with any problem. He can camouflage and change the color of his body due to being part chameleon via his grandfather.
- Livingstone T. Lion (voiced by Chris Hobbs) is a friendly lion who rules Animalia and the Keeper of the Core. He has a vast knowledge of the Core itself and just about everything and everyone in Animalia. He can be gentle, helpful and is always up for a game, but sometimes he is rather self-deprecating, wondering whether he can manage to bring Animalia back on track with its unstable Core.
- Reenie (voiced by Peta Johnson) is a Scottish-accented black rhinoceros. She works at Animalia's Great Library and helps Livingstone with keeping the Core stable whenever something goes wrong. Almost as smart as Livingstone and just as friendly, Reenie has a big heart with room for everyone, but also claims to have a "love friend" named Rumble.
- Allegra (voiced by Kate Higgins) is a teenage American alligator who lives in the swamps. Allegra is a self-loving and snappy creature who is very protective of her land. She dreams of being a singer, but the others find that unlikely due to her terrible voice, except for her two gal pals, Bitzy and Snitzy, who constantly follow Allegra and admire her thoughts. Her singing improved when Zoe taught her in "Animalia's Talent-o-Topia".
- Tyrannicus (voiced by Dean O'Gorman) is a smooth-talking Bengal tiger who serves as the main antagonist. Tyrannicus feels he should be ruler of Animalia rather than Livingstone. He finds ways of getting ahead by the use of various get-rich-quick schemes. He despises Alex and Zoe, who he refers to as "stink bugs" and especially wants to get rid of them. Tyrannicus ends up working with Alex and Zoe to stop the Creeper after being double-crossed.
- Fuchsia (voiced by Katie Leigh) is a French-accented red fox with pink fur and Tyrannicus' assistant. Always sent to help him arrange or develop plans, she is very intelligent. She serves as a secondary antagonist.
- Elni (voiced by Peta Johnson) and Erno (voiced by Chris Hobbs) are African forest elephants who run the Elephants Eatery, the local restaurant for all Animalians. Elni's warm personality makes her lovable by all, while Erno's cooking is something worth trying, despite his tendency to panic.
- Herry and Horble (known as the "Horrible Hogs") (voiced by Dean O'Gorman and Robert Mark Klein) are Cockney-accented warthogs who are a little crass at times. They are a duo of criminals. They are mostly seen riding on their motorcycles, specially equipped with loud speakers that play music wherever they go.
- Melba and Melford are the main news reporters on Animalia News, broadcasting all of the current news and happenings on Fluttervision. Melba is more level-headed and calm, whereas Melford is slightly more neurotic and rather slow thinking Klein)
- Zee and Zed are two zebras who ride in their large zeppelin, giving the low-down on Animalia from a bird's eye view. While Zed has a level head on his shoulders, Zee is very excitable and sometimes can't stop herself talking excitedly.
- Bitsy and Snitzy are Allegra's two female friends who do whatever she says. They're the only ones who respect Allegra's singing before Zoe taught her how.
- Victor and Verbal are a vulture comedy double act: Victor, a comedian, and his wisecracking partner, Verbal, who acts as his ventriloquist dummy for the bit. They are vegetarians, unlike normal vultures.
- Rombolt is a black rhinoceros and the head boss of the Fluttervision Office.
- The Creeper (voiced by Joey Lotsko) is an villanious long-tailed weasel who was once part of the Community Team until he was banished for using the secret portals to steal from the Animalians' homes. The Creeper, whose real name is Wooster Q. Weasel, plans to overthrow Animalia by taking control over the Core. At the end of the series, he is defeated when Livingstone touches the Core while the Creeper is inside, causing him to be shot out like a Core-spore into the Wind of No Return.
- The Toucans (both voiced by Robert Mark Klein) are a colorful band of birds who, whenever they talk, speak only one word in every sentence. Sometimes they get the words mixed up and confuse their sentences, sometimes having disastrous results; this was especially evident in "Long Story Short".
- Butterflies – In the world of Animalia, rather than television sets, the residents watch Fluttervision. Large beautiful butterflies fly from home to home and arrange themselves as a large screen where the Animalians can watch the latest happenings from the Animalian news. They only do this for a short time as they do get worn out if watched for too long.
- Peter Applebottom (voiced by Chris Hobbs) is a mad gorilla scientist.
- Dagmont Dragon is an ally who captured Zee and Zed Zebra.
- Whim (voiced by Peta Johnson) is a unicorn in "Over and Beyond". She made her first appearance in "Over and Beyond". When Zoe and Iggy touched her horn, they got transferred back to Animalia, which she didn't know.
- Carmine Chameleon is Iggy's grandfather.
- Echo Elephant is Elni and Erno's daughter.
- Hope and Harmony Hogs are a pair of warthog sisters who are far more ladylike then their male kin, enjoying skipping through the jungle. They are the love interests of Herry and Horble, who they appear to like, despite briefly falling for G'Bubu and Iggy.
- Mail Snail is a snail who serves as the Animalian equivalent of a mailman, but is extremely slow, often taking years to get the letter to the recipient.

== Episodes ==
Note: All episodes of the series were directed by David Scott.

=== Series overview ===
Series	Episodes		Originally released	
Series	Episodes		First released	Last released
1	18	Australia	11 November 2007	20 June 2008
1	18	U.S.	5 January 2008	2 August 2008
2	22	Australia	27 June 2008	7 November 2008
2	22	U.S.	17 January 2009	7 March 2009

=== Season 1 (2007–08) ===
No. overall	No. in season	Title	Written by	Australian air date	U.S. air date
1	1	"Hello, We Must Be Going"	Tom Ruegger	11 November 2007	5 January 2008
In the Metro Library, human kids Alex and Zoe enter a strange portal that carries them to the talking-animal world of Animalia, where they are mistaken for invading monsters by the general population. They meet Animalia's ruler, Livingstone, who befriends the kids and asks for their help in repairing the core, the magic orb that is at the center of Animalia's well-being. Alex and Zoe are taken under the wing of gentle but strong G'Bubu Gorilla and his best pal, the boastful Iggy. We also meet the librarian, Reenie Rhino, the Elephants, the Zebras, the Hogs, the Media Mice, and the series' two significant trouble-makers: Allerga Alligator and Tyrannicus Tiger, who take an immediate dislike to the human arrivals.
2	2	"Goodbye, We Must Be Staying"	Nicholas Hollander and Tom Ruegger	18 November 2007	12 January 2008
When several Corespore blast off, Alex and Zoe must track them down and restore them to the Core or the Animalian population will return to its feral, uncivilized state. Zoe is torn between her fascination with Animalia and her need to return home.
3	3	"The Mist of Time"	Tom Ruegger	25 November 2007	19 January 2008
After the Corespore of time blasts off, G'Bubu is swept back in time, to an ancient era when his gorilla ancestors fought for control of the trees against their mortal enemies, the tree frogs...big, big tree frogs. G'Bubu demonstrates acts of selfless heroism to save his friends.
4	4	"Catcher in the Rhyme"	Sherri Stoner and Tom Ruegger	2 December 2007	26 January 2008
During a poetry recital, Allegra expresses her disinterest in "rhymes" by throwing a tantrum that sends a Corespore flying. The result: all Animalians are compelled to speak only in rhyme. If they fail to come up with a rhyme, they become "frozen" in place. Zoe and Alex must recover the Corespore before the Animalians are stuck forever.
5	5	"Forget Me Not"	Nicholas Hollander and Tom Ruegger	16 December 2007	2 February 2008
When Erno and Elni Elephant, who never forget anything, suddenly forget everything, Alex and Zoe go on a search for Corespore in a place where lost Animalian memories go: Memory Canyon. The kids discover ancient catacombs where records of Animalia's long lost history are stored. They find the Corespore in time to restore the elephants' lost memories, and in time to thwart Tyrannicus' latest plan to take over the kingdom.
6	6	"Long Story Short"	Mark Seidenberg	23 December 2007	9 February 2008
An important message is incorrectly communicated and the kids must find the truth about Livingstone's disappearance. Livingstone tells Reenie he's leaving Animalia for the day to visit his Uncle Leo, but Reenie does not listen attentively, and she relays the wrong information to others. This Animalia-wide version of the game "Telephone" results in pandemonium, and Tyrannicus takes advantage of the situation by arranging to have G'Bubu banished and having himself proclaimed king.
7	7	"Righting the Writing"	John P. McCann	30 December 2007	16 February 2008
When a Corespore blasts off from the Core, words go missing all over Animalia. Tyrannicus uses this situation to evict G'Bubu from his tree house, while Allegra and her gator-gal pals search for the thief who allegedly stole the mammoth "Allerga" sign that she just installed on the roof of her home.
8	8	"Butterfly Winter"	John K. Ludin	21 March 2008	23 February 2008
Tyrannicus seizes control of the Fluttervision population and becomes the purveyor of multi-channeled television viewing, and hooks most Animalians in the process. But the control of the butterflies sends nature in Animalia into a tailspin, and the kids must free Animalia's nature spirits to save the day.
9	9	"Speechless in Animalia"	Sherri Stoner	4 April 2008	1 March 2008
When Tyrannicus' promotional campaign for Allegra's concert becomes too boisterous to tolerate, Livingstone calls out for "Quiet!" and he gets it, in spades, when a Corespore blasts off, rendering Animalians incapable of speech. The animals can make nothing but feral sounds. Alex and Zoe must recover the Corespore in hopes of restoring verbal communication to Animalia. This episode establishes that language in Animalia began with laughter.
10	10	"Don Iguana"	Mark Seinderberg	11 April 2008	8 March 2008
To prove his bravery to Zoe, Iggy follows the lead of his literary hero Don Quixote and dons a disguise to become "Don Iguana - the Venger of the Night" and Animalia's hero.
11	11	"Over & Beyond"	Sherri Stoner	18 April 2008	15 March 2008
Zoe travels to the land of Over and Beyond, a realm populated by fictional characters, to rescue Zed and Zee who have been captured by a fire breathing dragon named Dagmont. To ransom the zebras, Zoe must stay behind and entertain the dragon with her stories, like a latter day Sheherazade.
12	12	"Being Peter Applebottom"	Deanna Oliver and Tom Ruegger	25 April 2008	22 March 2008
When G'Bubu is hit on the bead by a bongo nut, he assumes the personality of Peter Applebottom, a brilliant but pompous and seriously unfriendly scientist who claims to know how to permanently fix the Core. Now if only he could fix his own personality.
13	13	"Animalia's Talent-O-Topia"	Deanna Oliver	2 May 2008	29 March 2008
When Allegra shows her vulnerability to Zoe and admits that she can't read, Zoe helps the gator write a song for her big solo in Animalia's talent contest. Iggy and G'Bubu also perform in the music competition.
14	14	"Brain Drain"	John P. McCann	9 May 2008	5 July 2008
Livingstone is feeling overworked and under-appreciated. But he gets to take the day off when a Corespore blast results in Livingstone and Allegra exchanging intellects: Allegra becomes a bona fide genius, and Livingstone turns into a happy-go-lucky twit. But while their brain power may be flopped, their personalities remain true to their natures: Allegra is all about Allegra, while Livingstone ultimately puts aside his own worries and fears to save the day and help Animalia.
15	15	"Save Our Swamp"	John P. McCann	16 May 2008	12 July 2008
Zoe and Tyrannicus, join forces to shut down and drain the swamp. They are opposed by Alex and Allegra, who want to spare the swamp. When Alex is struck with a swamp fever that can only be cured by a flower found deep in the swamp, Zoe puts aside her aversion to the bog and teams up with Allegra to track down the elusive plant.
16	16	"Tunnel Vision"	Sherri Stoner	23 May 2008	19 July 2008
Alex explores Animalia's tunnel system where he becomes trapped along with an Animalian he has never met before. A weasel named T.C. that Alex helps T.C. escape from his tunnel trap. But in the end, it's revealed that T.C. is actually The Creeper, the long-lost scourge of Animalia and Livingstone's nemesis.
17	17	"Iggy's Quest"	Deanna Oliver	30 May 2008	26 July 2008
On a visit to his grandfather's home, Iggy must come to terms with the fact that he is not a full-blooded iguana, but rather, is part chameleon. With the help of his grandfather Carmine, Iggy gets in touch with his "inner chameleon" and overcomes his fear of a recurring nightmare involving the dreaded "Creeper."
18	18	"What's the Good Word?"	Tom Ruegger and Deanna Oliver	6 June 2008	2 August 2008
Tyrannicus starts his own nation of Tyrannia and teams up with The Creeper (who remains in the shadows) to declare "war" on Animalia with the goal of driving Alex and Zoe out of the kingdom. "War" is an unknown word in Animalia. The battle is ultimately averted when the kids learn the meaning of "the pen is mightier than the sword."

=== Season 2 (2008) ===
No. overall	No. in season	Title	Written by	Australian air date	U.S. air date
19	1	"Alex's Secret Code"	Nicholas Hollander and Tom Ruegger	13 June 2008	17 January 2009
When the Core suffers a major eruption it loses a vital Corespore, the Origin Corespore, without which the future of Animalia is in serious jeopardy. In searching for the missing Corespore, Alex discovers a cave painting, with some symbols that help him learn that the Origin Corespore first brought language to Animalia. But now, with language and all communication skills limited or eroded, Animalia is under assault as TC and Tyrannicus plot to destroy the Core once and for all.
20	2	"Whistling in the Dark"	Tom Ruegger and Deanna Oliver	20 June 2008	24 January 2009
The search for the Creeper leads Alex and Zoe to the Chamber of Legends, a dusty room filled with Animalian relics. This room is connected to both the human world and to Animalia. Alex reveals to all that he helped a weasel escape from the tunnels, and only now does Alex learn that the weasel is none other than the notorious Creeper. The Core is in deep trouble, but Livingstone reveals there is new hope if they can find the whereabouts of the Superspore. (The Superspore is currently in the possession of the Creeper, who is unaware of its power and value.) The serious trouble facing our heroes is offset by the joyous arrival of Erno and Elni's new baby.
21	3	"The Call to Action"	Deanna Oliver	27 June 2008	31 January 2009
Livingstone calls an Animalian meeting to reveal that The Creeper is back. Livingstone, Alex and Zoe journey into the tunnels to find the Creeper. However, the Creeper uses the Wind of No Return to foil our heroes' attempts.
22	4	"The World According to Iggy"	Deanna Oliver	4 July 2008	7 February 2009
Iggy has been asked to baby-sit Echo, the baby elephant, while the baby's parents, Erno and Elni, handle their portal guarding shift. To entertain Echo, Iggy tells the baby elephant tales of Animalia in which Iggy casts himself as the hero. But the Creeper manages to sweep Elni and Erno into the tunnels, to take them out of the picture, in order to achieve his goal: to elephant-nap Echo, whom the Creeper believes stands in his way for control of Animalia.
23	5	"Nothing But the Truth"	John P. McCann	11 July 2008	21 February 2009
Tyrannicus plants a story that Livingstone is going to retire. Livingstone refutes the rumor, but many Animalians believe Tyrannicus. When the Truth Corespore blasts off, Animalians can only speak in lies. The kids must find the Corespore before Tyrannicus tricks Livingstone into quitting.
24	6	"The Dream Weavers"	Tom Ruegger	18 July 2008	28 February 2009
When nightmares plague Animalians, Alex and Zoe go to "Over and Beyond" where, they must find the dream-weaver and rescue Animalia from its dream troubles.
25	7	"Getting Over the Glums"	John P. McCann and Tom Ruegger	25 July 2008	7 March 2009
Livingstone and Reenie are struck by The Gluma, a rare Animalian version of "the blues". If not treated properly, "the Glums" can are irreversible. There is only one cure for "the Glums", a good long laugh. But there's one problem in achieving that laughter: those affected with the Glums don't find anything the least bit funny. Alex, Zoe, G'Bubu and Iggy, in order to save Livingstone and Reenie, must journey through the kingdom and search everywhere and everyone for, the funniest joke in Animalia. Note: This is the last episode to air in the United States.
26	8	"Tunnel King"	John P. McCann	1 August 2008	–
The Creeper's been stealing from the Animalians. However, without any hard evidence, Livingstone refuses to automatically blame The Creeper. Encouraged by Tyrannicus, the enraged Animalians rush into the tunnels, but it's a trap, and the Animalians are stuck in the tunnels. Meanwhile, the Creeper tries to sabotage the Core but is thwarted by Allegra (the only Animalian not in the tunnels).
27	9	"The Day Zoe Listened"	Deanna Oliver	8 August 2008	–
Alex bets Zoe that she cannot resist talking for one full day. It's a vow of silence. So, Zoe spends the day listening to the sounds of Animalia, and she makes some new friends and some huge discoveries. Zoe learns how to communicate with the sentient creatures of Animalia: the butterflies, the wasps, the crickets, the frogs, the fish, and other non-speaking creatures... including the plants and trees.
28	10	"Alex's Treasure Island"	John P. McCann, Tom Ruegger and Bruce Johnson	15 August 2008	–
Alex and the gang put on a production of Treasure Island, but mid-performance, a Corespore blows sending Animalia into a treasure hunt frenzy. Alex and Zoe journey to "Over and Beyond" to find the missing Corespore, while trying to figure out what type of Corespore it is.
29	11	"Taking a Guilt Trip"	John Loy	22 August 2008	–
Ever since Alex helped the Creeper escape from the portal, the boy has been wracked with guilt. Alex has the naive and unrealistic hope that he can convince the Creeper to turn over a new leaf. The Creeper is willing to play along with Alex...and try to lure Alex over to his side. In order to thwart the Creeper, Alex pretends to join the Creeper's cause.
30	12	"The Animal Within"	Deanna Oliver and Sherri Stoner	29 August 2008	–
When Alex and Zoe share a meal with the Horrible Hogs at the Elephants' Eatery, the kids are appalled by the Hogs' awful table manners, crudeness and limited social skills. The Hoity-Toity toucan overhears, and puts a spell on Alex and Zoe, making them Neanderthal versions of themselves. The Hogs agree to help Alex and Zoe.
31	13	"The Mystery of the Missing Melba"	John Loy	5 September 2008	–
Alex gets a video camera for his birthday and he ends up doing video research, which turns into a "hard-boiled detective documentary" about the "missing Melba" - who's not really lost, just out shopping for ice cream to bring to Alex's birthday surprise party.
32	14	"Scary Story Go Round"	John Loy and Tom Ruegger	12 September 2008	–
Once a year, Animalia celebrates with the traditional story-telling game called "Scary-Story-Go Round". Everyone in Animalia takes a turn to tell (make up) one continuous and very scary story.
33	15	"The Ballad of the Creeper"	Tom Ruegger	19 September 2008	–
Following the blueprints of the scientist Peter Applebottom, the Creeper has invents a device that can corrupt the Corespore. By corrupting the Corespore, the Creeper turns all Animalians including Alex and Zoe into ninnies. The only species not affected by the corruption is gorillas. Thus, G'Bubu must lead the quest to restore the Corespore and free Animalia from ninni-ness.
34	16	"From A to Z"	Mark Seidenberg and Tom Ruegger	26 September 2008	–
When pages disappear from Animalia's Big Book of Words, Animalians lose the ability to use those words. As their vocabularies shrink, the chaos in Animalia grows. Alex and Zoe must find why the pages are disappearing and restore the words to Animalia.
35	17	"The Dragon and the Night"	John P. McCann, Deanna Oliver and Tom Ruegger	3 October 2008	–
A Corespore blasts off and flies to the land of "Over and Beyond", where fictional characters live. With this Corespore missing, Animalians seem not to be able to agree about anything. A Zebra Zeppelin reconnaissance mission reveals that the missing Corespore is now in the possession of Dagmont the Dragon, and Iggy is sent over to retrieve the missing Corespore and, he hopes, restore peace and tranquility to Animalia.
36	18	"Tomorrow"	John Loy	10 October 2008	–
Alex and Zoe join forces to write an original sci-fi story entitled "Tomorrow." The story asks "if the world is going to end tomorrow, what would you do?" Alex and Zoe learn that compromise is a big part of collaboration, even as the story gets out of control and Animalians believe they are doomed.
37	19	"Guardians of the Core"	Deanna Oliver	17 October 2008	–
Alex finds the Guardians of the Core Guidebook, which provides words and phrases that can help the Core. But when Alex isn't careful with the words he uses the Core becomes a musical jukebox causing Animalias to sing and dance uncontrollably. In the Catacombs, Alex and Zoe discover that they are the "Guardians of the Core" with special powers to help heal the Core. They restore peace to Animalia by singing the Core a lullaby.
38	20	"Paradise Found"	John P. McCann, Deanna Oliver and Tom Ruegger	24 October 2008	–
With the Creeper gone and peace restored to Animalia, Alex and Zoe decide it's time to go home. Livingstone also decides to take a much needed break, but before he can go, he must choose a new leader. Allegra and Tyrannicus vie for the position, but ultimately Livingstone knows that a good leader must lead with his heart and he gives the Coconut of Command to G'Bubu and Iggy.
39	21	"Back to the Present"	John P. McCann, Deanna Oliver and Tom Ruegger	31 October 2008	–
After a few days in the "real world," Alex and Zoe miss Animalia and want to return. But when they arrive, the city is in disrepair. They discover that time in Animalia moves at a different rate and a few days in their world is over a year in Animalia. Much to their surprise, G'Bubu and Iggy are no longer the leaders of Animalia, and instead King Tyrannicus is ruling the city. Alex and Zoe join the fight against Tyrannicus's oppressive rule and in a surprise write-in campaign become the rulers of Animalia themselves.
40	22	"What the World Needs Now"	John P. McCann, Deanna Oliver and Tom Ruegger	7 November 2008	–
The Creeper is back and he uses his knowledge of the Core to gain power and force the Animalians to do his bidding. Alex and Zoe are sent to "protective custody", while G'Bubu and Iggy are searching the portals for Livingstone. Livingstone is brought back to Animalia and must face a super-charged Creeper for the final rule of Animalia.

== Production ==
The series is computer-animated, and 40 half-hour episodes were produced by Animalia Productions, based at Village Roadshow Studios in Queensland, and visual effects companies Photon VFX, and Iloura Digital Pictures. The animation was rendered by Autodesk Maya.

=== Development ===
The series was first conceived in 1999 when Australian producer Ewan Burnett met with Base, and obtained the rights to an adaptation of the best-selling book. In early 2002, Burnett finalised the funding arrangements with Australian and international broadcast partners and investors, but the project was delayed when the British government revised the United Kingdom's taxation laws so that projects claiming special tax status had to be delivered in the financial year they were claimed. After three years of re-financing, Animalia began production in 2005.

The book on which the series was based is a picture book with each spread depicting an elaborate illustration in which every animal and object begins with a particular letter of the alphabet. As there was no coherent narrative or central characters, these were developed with the concept of a fantasy world where animals of all kinds intermingled and interacted becoming the central theme.

As the series was to be broadcast internationally, the alphabetical theme central to the book was dropped, as it was based on the English language alphabet and would lose its meaning if the program were dubbed into other languages.

== Broadcast ==
BBC Worldwide initially handled distribution in all territories except for North America, where PorchLight Entertainment distributed the series. In December 2009, Cyber Group Studios took over global distribution rights from both companies.

The series began running in Australia on Network Ten at noon on Sundays beginning on 11 November 2007, and also on Nickelodeon since May 2008. In the United Kingdom it aired on CBBC on BBC One beginning on 19 November 2007. The series also aired in the United States on PBS Kids Go! from 5 January 2008 to 6 September 2009.

As of 3 November 2008, the show is also running on NRK in Norway. In Latin America, the series began running on Animal Planet and later in Venezuela on Tves. In India, the show is broadcast on Cartoon Network India.

The other broadcast partners and investors in the series have not yet announced their broadcast schedules. The international networks involved in the production are: the BBC in the United Kingdom and CBC in Canada. The series will also be broadcast by SABC 2 in South Africa, Al Jazeera and in Israel.

== Home media releases ==
- On 30 June 2008, the first seven episodes of the series were released on DVD in the UK by 2Entertain, entitled Animalia: Where Animals Rule!.
- Four episodes from season one were released on DVD and Blu-ray in the US by PorchLight Home Entertainment on 23 September 2008.
- On 8 September 2009, the first season was released on DVD by Imavision in Canada.

== Reception ==
=== Critical response ===
A reviewer for The New York Times commented that the phrase "'based on the book by' may never have been stretched so far" in the creation of this TV series, while characterizing it as "weird" and "intermittently interesting."

=== Awards ===
In 2008, Animalia was nominated for the BAFTA Children's Kids Vote Award.

In 2009, composer Christopher Elves won a Daytime Emmy award for Outstanding Music Direction and Composition for his work on Animalia's musical score.

==== APRA-AGSC Awards ====
The annual Screen Music Awards are presented by Australasian Performing Right Association (APRA) and Australian Guild of Screen Composers (AGSC).

- 2008 Best Music for Children's Television win for Animalia – "Butterfly Winter" composed by Christopher Elves.

== Merchandise ==
PorchLight Entertainment owned worldwide licensing and merchandising rights to the series while BBC Worldwide handled the UK, Australia and New Zealand.

In 2008, BBC Children's Books and the Penguin Group published four books by Mandy Archer based on the series: the Animalia Colouring Book, the Animalia Sticker Activity Book, plus two storybooks, Animalia: Hello, we must be going and Animalia: Goodbye, we must be staying which were based upon the first and second episodes of the same name and adapted from the scripts by Tom Ruegger. All four books have text and design by Children's Character Books and all but the colouring book are heavily illustrated with colour screenshots from the series.
