= The Legend of the Golden Snail =

Book by Graeme Base

The Legend of the Golden Snail is the 14th children's book written and illustrated by author Graeme Base. It was published in 2010, by a collaboration of Penguin Books and Viking (publisher). Featuring rhymes and detailed illustrations this book is best suited for ages 5 and up.

The story follows the adventure of Wilbur who, along with his cat, decides to undertake a voyage to find the 'golden snail'. To get to the golden snail they travel past several places, while going past various locations Wilbur helps various magical/mechanical creatures, who later in the story help Wilbur in times of hardship.

The book builds on the literature themes of friendship and kindness bringing about positive rewards while having conservationist/environmental undertones.

Finally, like all Graeme Base books there are multiple hidden images in every picture. In The Legend of the Golden Snail, there is a snail/skull and crossbones hidden in every page, as well as hidden images relating to other pages in the story.
