= The Worst Band in the Universe =

1999 book by Graeme Base

- Author: Graeme Base
- Language: English
- Published: 1999 Harry N. Abrams, Inc.
- Publication place: Australia
- Media type: Print (Hardcover)
- Pages: 48
- ISBN: 0810939983

The Worst Band In The Universe is a science fiction children's book written and illustrated by Graeme Base published in 1999 by Harry N. Abrams, Inc. The book comes with a CD containing music based on a music competition that occurs in the middle of the story. Like many of Base's books, the book has minimal text written in verse along with large detailed pictures.

The inspiration for the story came from the author's wanting to write something about music, having played in a band prior to his career as an author and illustrator.

== Plot summary ==
The story follows the adventures of a young groob, named Sprocc, who loves to play with his splingtwanger (a guitar-like instrument). On his homeworld, planet Blipp, creativity is stifled and only the traditional music passed down from many generations is allowed. This stagnant environment quickly becomes too much for the artistic Sprocc and he improvises his own music, this nearly gets him exiled from his homeworld. But, he decides "life on Blipp for him was through", so he goes to an urban planet where he meets a variety of aliens. There he makes some new friends and learns of a competition for the "Worst Band in the Universe". The irony of this title is that within the context of the stagnant music environment, a creative band would be considered bad and the most creative band considered the "Worst". However, after winning the competition, Sprocc learns that the contest is a sham run by the same imperial authorities stifling music creativity. Sprocc and his bandmates are sent in exile to the junkyard planet, Wastedump B19, where Sprocc meets another exile called Skat. After a persistent effort by Sprocc, eventually Skat is persuaded to help Sprocc, his bandmates, and the other exiles build a ship, that is powered by music, and return to Blipp one year later.

After returning to Blipp, the music exiles perform a grand show but are eventually stopped by the imperial authorities. However, the elder leader of Blipp comes out and explains that the old ways are no longer viable, that Sprocc and his friends represent the new generation of music creativity, and that they should be embraced and supported. With their authority stripped away, the Imperials can do nothing but watch the new generation and their new music.

The book comes with a bonus CD. The CD covers some of the music performed at the "worst band in the universe competition" in the novel. All the music was written and performed by Graeme Base.
