= Reindeer's Christmas Surprise =

Australian children's book

Reindeer's Christmas Surprise is a book for children created for the Sydney department store David Jones’ animated Christmas Windows for 2014. The David Jones windows are part of a world-wide historic tradition of animated displays created by department stores at Christmas time. Traditionally the David Jones windows have often featured snowy European scenarios, but the 2014 windows are set in a distinctly Australian summer, featuring beach and rainforest scenes. The story, also published as a book, was written for the windows by Australian author Ursula Dubosarsky with illustrations by Sue De Gennaro.
