= Tohby Riddle =

Australian artist and writer/illustrator of picture books and illustrated books

- Occupations: Author and cartoonist
- Writing career
- Genre: Children's Picture Books
- Website: www.tohby.com

Tohby Riddle is an Australian artist and writer/illustrator of picture books and illustrated books that have been published in many countries, and translated into many languages, around the world. His work has been translated by Haruki Murakami and he has been nominated for the 2022 Hans Christian Andersen Medal.

Riddle's picture books include The Great Escape from City Zoo, The Royal Guest, Nobody Owns the Moon, My Uncle's Donkey and Unforgotten. Other books include The Greatest Gatsby: a visual book of grammar, the Word Spy books written by Ursula Dubosarsky and illustrated by Riddle, the novel The Lucky Ones, and two cartoon collections, What's the Big Idea? and Pink Freud. The cartoon collections are selected from his work as the weekly cartoonist for Good Weekend magazine (Sydney Morning Herald and Melbourne's Age), a position he held for nearly ten years from 1997–2006.

In 2005 he became editor of The School Magazine, a literary magazine for children founded in 1916, in which his illustrations, non-fiction pieces and poems have also appeared regularly. In 2009 he won the Patricia Wrightson Prize in the New South Wales Premier's Literary Awards with Ursula Dubosarsky for their book The Word Spy.

In 2018, Riddle's book My Uncle's Donkey was translated into a Japanese edition by one of the world's greatest living writers Haruki Murakami after Mr Murakami discovered the book in a Melbourne bookshop on a visit to Australia. This edition was published in December 2018 by Asunaro Shobo.

In December 2020 Riddle was nominated by Australia for the 2022 Hans Christian Andersen Award.

As an artist, Riddle's paintings have continued to gain a following since a sell-out show in 2018. In 2022, His first solo exhibition, Silent Light, was held at the Blue Mountains Cultural Centre to considerable acclaim and 38 paintings were sold. In 2023, his Wynne Prize entry was included in the Salon des Refuses, at the SH Ervin Gallery. His paintings are in the collections of the State Library of NSW and the Blue Mountains Cultural Centre.

== List of books ==
- Careful With that Ball, Eugene! (1989, US 1991, UK 1991)
- A Most Unusual Dog (1992, US 1993)
- Arnold Z Jones Could Really Play the Trumpet (1993, reprinted 2000)
- The Royal Guest (1993)
- 50 Fairies You Ought to Know About (1995, Germany 2004)
- The Tip at the End of the Street (1996). IBBY Australia Ena Noel encouragement award for Children's Literature; Children's Book Council of Australia Notable Book 1997
- The Great Escape from City Zoo (1997, US 1999). Shortlisted for the Children's Book Council of Australia Picture Book of the Year 1998, and the New South Wales Premier's Literary Awards 1999
- The Singing Hat (2000, US 2001). Honour book in the Children's Book Council of Australia Picture Book of the Year awards for 2001; Joint winner of the Wilderness Society of Australia's Environment Award 2001, Picture Books category; Australian Publishers Association Design Awards, 2000, winner of Best Designed Children's Cover; Highly commended in Best Designed Children's Picture Book category; Commended in the Best Designed Jacket of the Year category
- What’s the Big Idea? (2003) Highly commended in the Australian Publishers Association Design Awards for 2003, in the Best Designed Illustrated Book category
- Irving the Magician (2005) Shortlist, 2006 Picture Book of the Year, Children's Book Council of Australia
- The Great Escape from City Zoo (2007, reissue)
- Dog and Bird See the Moon (2007)
- The Royal Guest (2007, reissue)
- Nobody Owns the Moon (2008) Shortlisted, NSW Premier's Literary Awards. Shortlisted, Children's Book Council of Australia Picture Book of the Year awards for 2009
- The Word Spy (2008, with Ursula Dubosarsky). Winner, Patricia Wrightson Prize, NSW Premier's Literary Awards, 2009; Honour Book, Eve Pownall Book of the Year 2009, Children's Book Council of Australia Awards
- The Lucky Ones (2009)
- Return of the Word Spy (2010, with Ursula Dubosarsky). Winner, Eve Pownall Book of the Year 2009, Children's Book Council of Australia Awards
- My Uncle's Donkey (2010) Picture Book of the Year 2011, Honour award, Children's Book Council of Australia Awards
- Unforgotten (2012) Shortlisted, NSW Premier's Literary awards
- The Greatest Gatsby: a visual book of grammar (2015) Shortlisted, NSW Premier's Literary awards; Shortlisted, Prime Minister's Literary Awards; Selected as a White Raven, International Youth Library, Germany
- Milo: a moving story (2016)
- Here Comes Stinkbug! (2018) Honour Book, Children's Book Council of Australia Awards
- Yahoo Creek: an Australian mystery (2019) Shortlisted, Eve Pownall Book of the Year, Children's Book Council of Australia Awards; Finalist, Best Graphic Novel/Illustrated Work, Aurealis Awards 2019; Bilby Award, QLD, 2022
- Nobody Owns the Moon (2019, 10th anniversary reissue)
- The Astronaut's Cat (2020) Longlisted, Best Designed Children's Illustrated Book, Australian Book Design Awards 2021
- The March of the Ants (2021, with Ursula Dubosarsky)
