= Uno's Garden =

- Author: Graeme Base
- Cover artist: Graeme Base
- Language: English
- Genre: picture book, children's book
- Publisher: Penguin Books
- Publication date: 2006
- Publication place: Australia
- Media type: Print (Hardcover)
- ISBN: 978-0-670-04191-6
- OCLC: 224572751

Uno's Garden is a picture book written and illustrated by Australian children's author Graeme Base. The story features themes of environmental degradation, conservation of nature and habitat, and extinction. It also features arithmetic, and at the back of the book there are instructions for several number games relating to the book. It also contains a game in the book that challenges the reader to find an amount of plants, animals, buildings and sometimes one snortlepig. All of the animals and plants featured in the book were invented by the author. Some of the animals included are the snortlepig, moopaloops, lumpybums, and frinklepods; and some of the plants are the leefytree, featherferns, sunnycups, and shadyblades.

The human voice of the story is that of the aptly named Uno, the first human to move into a forest. The story continues as other people follow Uno in moving into the forest and, as the number of people and buildings increases, the number of plants and animals decreases until there are none left, which leads to future generations rebuilding the city with more environmental consciousness. The book was chosen as the theme of the 2007 Myer Christmas Windows in Melbourne and Brisbane, Australia.

== Awards ==
- 2008 COOL Awards - Picture Book Category - Shortlisted
- 2008 KROC Awards - Picture Book Category - Shortlisted
- 2008 Kids Own Australian Literature Award (KOALA) - Picture Book Category - Shortlisted
- 2008 Young Australian Best Book Award (YABBA) - Picture Book Category - Winner
- 2007 Green Earth Book Award - Winner
- 2007 Book of the Year Awards - Lower Primary Category - Winner
- 2007 Wilderness Society Environment Award - Picture Book Category - Winner
- 2007 Australian Book Industry Awards - Young Children - Shortlisted
- 2007 Kids Own Australian Literature Award (KOALA) - Picture Book Category - Shortlisted
