= Bertrand Planes =

French visual artist (born 1975)

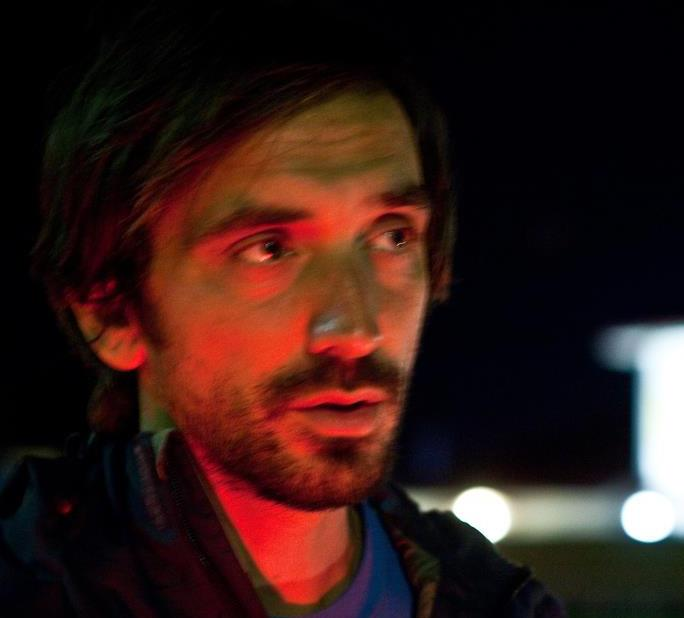
- Born: June 23, 1975 (age 51); Perpignan, France
- Education: Ecole des Beaux Arts de Grenoble, Grenoble; Ecole Nationale Superieure des Arts Decoratifs, Paris
- Known for: Artist

Bertrand Planes (born 1975) is a French visual artist who lives and works in Paris, France. His artworks often involve subverting and finding new uses for everyday objects.

== Biography ==
He represented France in the 2005 La Paz Bienniale.

His works include shop Christmas window displays for Le Bon Marché in Paris.

== Emmaus ==
In 1999 he developed the brand "Emmaus" in reference of French Emmaus Charity shops. The brand became official in 2003 when Martin Hirsch signed with Bertrand Planes its creation. He organised about 10 fashion shows in France, mainly in Paris. http://www.bertrandplanes.com/emmaus/PressReview.pdf

== DivxPrime ==
In 2004, he developed DivX prime a modified divX codec made to produce visual effects using compression artifact. Today known as Datamoshing technique

== Life Clock ==
His Life Clock is a slowed-down clock which runs 61320 times slower than normal: 1 minute on the clock takes a year for the hands to cross.

== Bump It! ==
first video mapping
In 2006 after a workshop with CNRS (French National Scientific Research Center) he developed a very new video projection technique, today known as 'Video Mapping'. He called it BumpIt! in reference of bump mapping
First Video Mapping at Artcore Galerie, Paris, 2006

== Bump It! tour ==
In 2011 he spent 2 months and half travelling around Russia, 13500 km by car from Vladivostok to Moscow and 12 solo shows on the way. This resulted in Bump It! tour, shown at the 4th Moscow Biennale of Contemporary Art in 2011.

== Solo exhibitions ==
2011 A ciel ouvert, Terril D'Haillicourt, France
2011 Bump it! tour, Russia
2011 no signal, New Galerie, Paris, France
2011 the place we've been, Galerie Ben Kaufman, Berlin
2010 New Galerie, Paris
2010 à moins que.., Théâtre de l'Agora, Évry, France
2010 Formula Gallery, Etagi, St Petersbourg, Russia
2009 Bateau mouche 2, Futur en Seine, Paris, France
2008 Bump it!, Église Sainte Elisabeth Paris, France
2008 Untitled, Galerie Griesmar & Tamer, Paris, France
2007 Low Tone, Galerie Artcore, Paris, France
2005 mar:3D, SIART Biennale, La Paz, Bolivia
2005 Emmaüs, Porte de Versailles, Paris, France
2004 Live for Vibro, Gaîté Lyrique, Paris, France

== Group exhibitions ==
2012 Battleground States, Utah Museum of Contemporary Art, Salt Lake City, USA
2012 This Town Deserves a Better Class of Criminals, New York Gallery, NYC, USA
2012 White Night, Alliance Française, Vanuatu Islands, Vanuatu
2012 Life Clock, Den Frie center of Contemporary Art, Copenhagen, Denmark
2012 Shoes Or No Shoes?, sons, Kruishoutem, Belgium
2011 O'Clock, Triennale di Milano, Milan, Italy
2011 La Fabrique Sonore, Pommery, Reims, France
2011 Art Garden, Singapore Art Museum, Singapore
2011 16Bits Miracle, Centro Cultural Banco Bresil, Brasilia, Brazil
2011 Wrong, IMO projects, Copenhagen, Denmark
2011 Dessins Exquis, JTM galerie, Paris, France
2011 Bumpit!-flat, Ososphère, Strasbourg, France
2011 Cyril Hatt & Bertrand Planes, Gal. Bertrand Grimont, Paris, France
2010 aysywtq; Art Copenhagen "State of the art", Copenhagen, Denmark
2010 bumpit!, DNS, Singapore Art Museum, Singapore
2010 Prix Meurice pour l'art contemporain, Hotel Meurice, Paris, France
2010 fake off, Krenöbl, Berlin, Germany
2010 loading, pm galerie, Berlin, Germany
2010 Duel, JTM Gallery, Paris, France
2009 Siana, Nanchang, Chinabr> 2009 Bande Annonce, New galerie de France, Paris, France
2009 mar:3d, Bienal VentoSul, Instituto Paranaense de arte, Curitiba, Brazil
2009 à la limite, galerie Michel Journiac, Paris, France
2009 Bump it!, Institut Français, St Petersbourg, Russia
2009 Bump it!, Nuit Blanche, mairie du 4e, Paris, France
2008 Troisieme planète, La Générale, Paris, France
2008 Festival Nemo, Paris, France
2007 untitled, galerie Roger Tator, TAC Eindhoven, Netherland
2007 J'aime beaucoup ce que vous faites, Envoy, NYC, USA

== Gallery ==
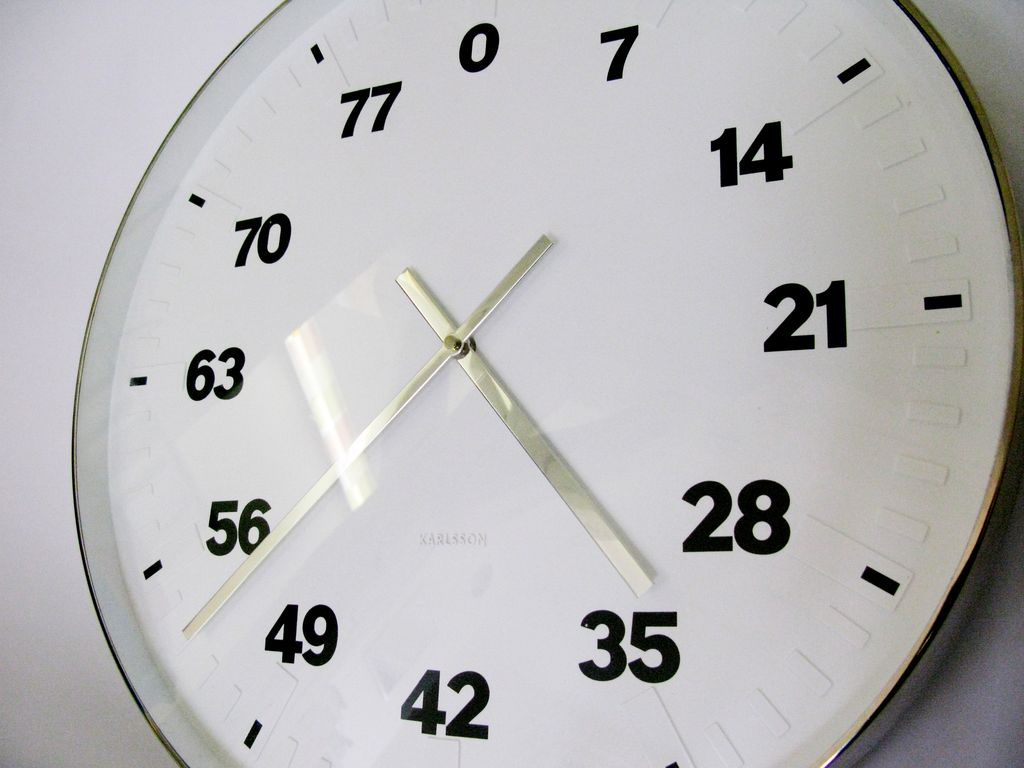
Life Clock 2008
