= Graeme Base =

Australian artist and children's writer

- Born: 6 April 1958 (age 68); Amersham, Buckinghamshire, England
- Occupations: Author, Illustrator
- Spouse: Robyn
- Writing career
- Notable work: Animalia (1986)
- Website: graemebase.com.au

Graeme Rowland Base (born 6 April 1958) is a British-Australian author and artist of picture books. He is perhaps best known for his second book, Animalia published in 1986, and third book The Eleventh Hour which was released in 1989.

== Early life ==
He was born in Amersham, England and moved to Australia with his family at the age of eight. He has lived there ever since. He attended Box Hill High School and Melbourne High School in Melbourne, and then studied a Diploma of Art (Graphic Design) for three years at Swinburne University of Technology at Prahran.

== Career ==
He worked in advertising for two years and then began illustrating children's books, gradually moving to authoring them as well. His first book, My Grandma lived in Gooligulch, was accepted by the first publisher he sent it to.

Base resides in Melbourne with his wife Robyn and has three children.

== Publishings ==
- Susan Burke's The Island Bike Business (Co-illustrator with Betty Greenhatch, 1982)
- My Grandma Lived in Gooligulch (1983)
- Jan Anderson's The Days of the Dinosaurs (Illustrator, 1985)
- Animalia (1986)
- Maureen Stewart's Creation Myths (Illustrator, 1987)
- Lewis Carroll's Jabberwocky (Illustrator, 1987)
- Maureen Stewart's Creation Stories (Illustrator, 1988)
- The Eleventh Hour (1989)
- The Sign of the Seahorse (1992)
- The Discovery of Dragons (1996)
- Lewis Carroll's Jabberwocky: A Book of Brillig Dioramas (Illustrator, 1996)
- The Worst Band in the Universe (1999)
- The Waterhole (2001)
- Truck Dogs (2003)
- Jungle Drums (2004)
- Uno's Garden (2006)
- The Discovery of Dragons: New Research Revealed (2007)
- Enigma (2008)
- Julie Watts' The Art of Graeme Base (Illustrator, 2008)
- The Legend of the Golden Snail (2010)
- The Jewel Fish of Karnak (2011)
- Little Elephants (2012)
- The Gallant Captain (Co-director, with Katrina Mathers, 2013)
- My First Animalia (2013)
- Breather (Graphic novel co-author, 2013)
- The Last King of Angkor Wat (2014)
- Eye to Eye (2015)
- Little Bug Books (A series of six toddlers' books; 2014, 2016)
- The Amazing Monster Detectoscope (2017)
- Bumblebunnies (A series of four picture books; 2018–20)
- Moonfish (2019)
- The Tree (2020)

The Eleventh Hour: A Curious Mystery was re-released five years later in 1993 with a new, special sealed section in the back called "The Inside Story". Labelled "TOP SECRET", it carries the paragraph: Within lies the solution to the Curious Mystery of The Eleventh Hour, as well as detailed explanations of all the clues and puzzles in the illustrations. Do not turn this page until you have tried your hardest to unravel the Mystery – for the getting of wisdom is no match for the thrill of the chase, and those who choose the longer road shall reap their reward! — Graeme Base

Graeme's first (and to date only) novel, Truck Dogs (A Novel in Four Bites), was released in hardcover and paperback. It includes 16 colour plates of profiles of the half-dog / half-vehicle characters, as they would have appeared in the abandoned picture book, before Graeme decided to instead release the story as a novel for teenagers and younger readers.

Colouring books based on Animalia was published in 2002 and for The Waterhole in 2004. A series of jigsaw puzzles were created for selected illustrations from Animalia. Calendars based on Graeme's works were published throughout the 1990s and early 2000s. In 1987, Viking published The Animalia Wall Frieze, a giant frieze over 26 feet (or 8 metres) long, in four folded sections, in a special pack which included 'The ANIMALIA Riddle Sheet' (with provided answers) as an added bonus.

== Adaptations of Base's works ==
- The Sign of the Seahorse was adapted as an opera with the Melbourne Symphony Orchestra in 2001.
- An exhibition was created based on The Water Hole and displayed at the National Museum of Australia.
- My Grandma Lived in Gooligulch was adapted as a play by Gooligulch Productions. The play premiered at the Chookahs! Kids Festival (Melbourne) in 2006 and is touring country areas in Victoria, NSW and Queensland.
- Animalia has been made into a television series (Animalia), and also is one of the most sold books around the world. Base was an executive producer for the series, and also composed the opening theme music with Yuri Worontschak.
- Animalia was made into an iPhone and iPad app in 2010. Published on the iTunes app store by AppBooks and produced by The Base Factory. An iPhone app based on Jungle Drums was released by Inyerpocket in 2008.
- Between Boxing Day 2012 and April 2013, Sand Sculpting Australia held their annual exhibition in Frankston, Victoria called "Under the Sea" and included a sculpture based on Graeme's book The Sign of the Seahorse. Their 2013–14 exhibition, "Storyland", was themed on various children's book titles, television shows, and other media, and included a sculpture based on The Discovery of Dragons.

== Awards ==
- Animalia – 1987 Children's Book Council of Australia (CBCA) Picture Book of the Year Honour book
- The Eleventh Hour – 1989 CBCA Picture Book of the Year Joint winner
- 1998 Dromkeen Medal
- TruckDogs: A novel in four bites – 2004 CBCA Book of the Year: Younger Readers
- Uno's Garden – 2007 Green Book Award: Picture Book
