= The Golden Day =

2011 novel by Ursula Dubosarsky

- Author: Ursula Dubosarsky
- Cover artist: Zoë Sadokierski
- Language: English
- Genre: Young Adult; Mystery
- Publisher: Allen & Unwin
- Publication date: 2011
- Publication place: Australia
- ISBN: 978-1-74237-471-0

The Golden Day (2011) is a young adult mystery novel by Australian author Ursula Dubosarsky. The novel is set in Sydney, Australia in 1967.

== Plot introduction ==
In a class of only eleven schoolgirls, the young and enthusiastic teacher Miss Renshaw disappears after an unexpected excursion to the Gardens. There, they meet the mysterious Morgan and take a trip into a deep, dark cave. The girls return to school that day without a teacher. And so, Miss Renshaw is declared missing while the rest of the teachers scramble to get an answer. Only, Miss Renshaw told the schoolgirls never to tell what happened that day. Bethany breaks her promise in the end under pressure from Mr Dern. Eventually a news report is released with details of Morgan's past and Miss Renshaw is declared dead.

== Plot summary ==
The Golden Day is about a class of 11 girls and their teacher, Miss Renshaw. They are like a big family all perched up in a Sydney school from 1967. That year started off with a man getting hanged, the last man to be hanged in Australia, and PM Holt also went missing.

The new teacher, Miss Renshaw, loves poetry and always takes the girls put on class excursions to the park. They would meet with Morgan, the teacher's 'boyfriend', a supposed gardener and poet, who refused to go to war.

One day, they go to the park to think about death in relation to the hanging of Ronald Ryan. They meet Morgan again and he teaches them about poetry and nature. Along with Miss Renshaw, he convinces the children to go into a secret cave along the beach. On their way to the cave a naked man unexpectedly appears, staring. When they give him a second glance, he is gone.

Soon enough they are in a cave with Aboriginal Dreaming paintings along the walls and ceiling of the cave and Morgan's lecture continues. He leads them deeper in and eventually it is so dark and so cramped that one of the girls gets an asthma attack. They decide to turn back without their teacher, who in turn does not protest their leaving. In the end the teacher never comes back. After an investigation is held, they find out that Morgan is actually a criminal and he is the main suspect.

Eight years later Cubby, Icara, Martine and Bethany go to a cafe to celebrate the end of their tests when they meet Miss Renshaw again. But for some reason she is still the same, wearing exactly the same clothes as the day she disappeared. Cubby, unlike the others, knows that she is a ghost, or a spirit of some sort. This is because she wears exactly the same pendant that the police found, broken, on the cave floor.

== Characters ==
=== Main ===
- Cubby: Main character; the story is told through her perspective, indirectly. She is a shy girl who is in the class of eleven. Her only real friend is Icara, who she is able to sit with yet not talk for long periods of time. When Miss Renshaw comes back, she notices the amber necklace, the same one that was in the police bag in a warehouse of unsolved crimes.
- Icara: The best friend of Cubby. Her mother died, but Icara believes she lives in Los Angeles. She lives with her single father, who is a judge, and a 'granny', Mrs Ellerman who ended up marrying him. She is described by Miss Renshaw as reserved and a realist.
- Miss Renshaw: The teacher that goes missing. She has red, springy hair and is described as tall, noble and strong. The only outfit she wore in the book was a droopy geometrical dress. She has a boyfriend called Morgan, who reportedly murdered her. She comes back after a number of years, yet she still looked exactly the same as the day she disappeared.
- Martine: A new student who just recently moved to Sydney from New Caledonia. She is bilingual (she can speak English and French) and has a French accent.
- Morgan: He is a poet, gardener and a conscientious objector, that is, a person who refuses to fight in the war. Described in the book as having soft, beautiful eyes, poor, handsome, clever and even famous, has a voice that is low and owlish, tender, and a hippie. Later in the book we find out that he was a criminal and a suspect for the murder of Miss Renshaw.
- Bethany: A little girl with the biggest eyes. She always seems to cry about everything. She told the authorities about what happened in the cave.
