= Ursula Dubosarsky =

Australian writer

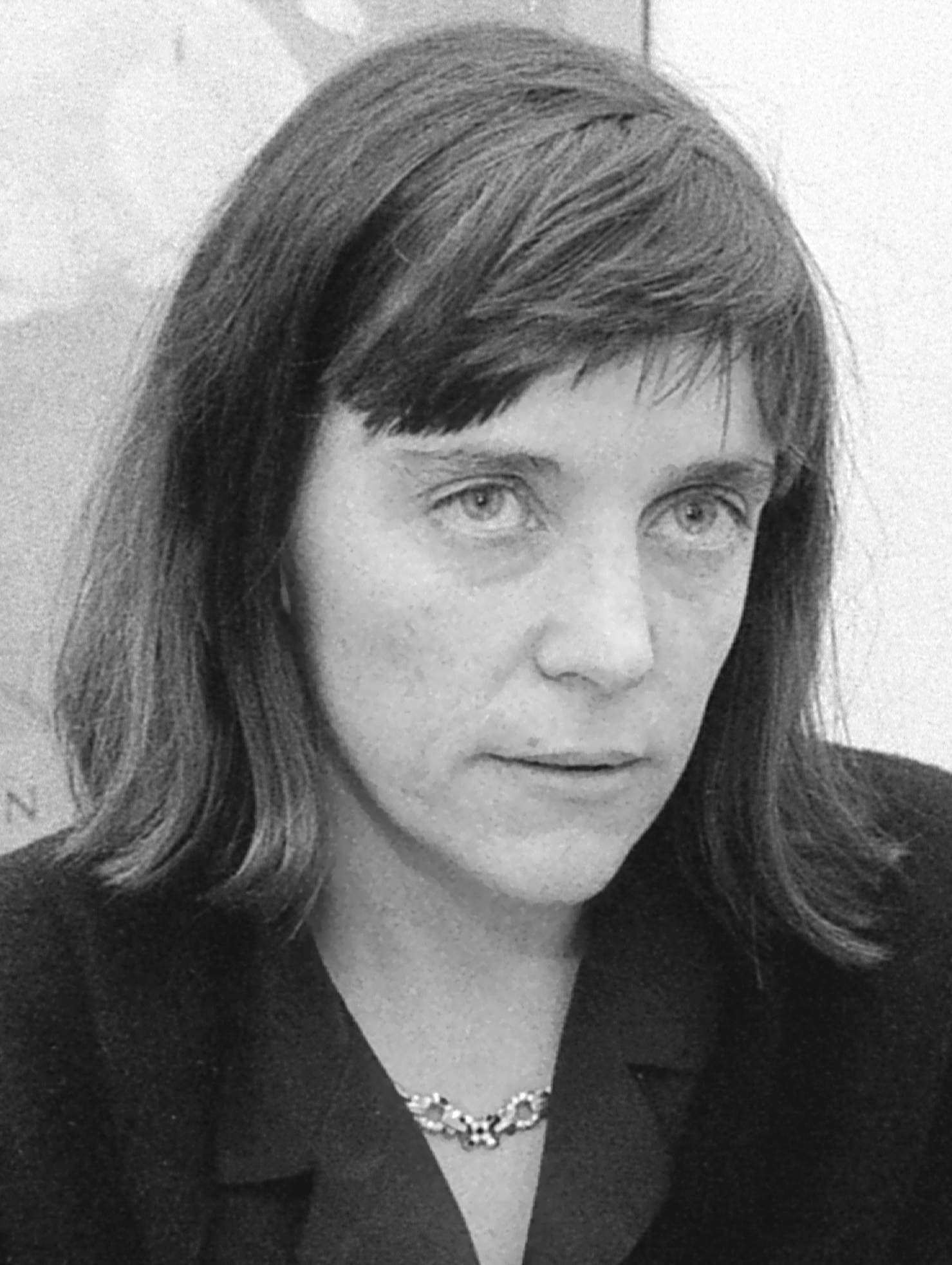
- Dubosarsky in 2000
- Born: Ursula Coleman; 1961 (age 64–65); Sydney, New South Wales, Australia
- Education: University of Sydney; Macquarie University
- Occupations: Writer for children and young adults
- Writing career
- Language: English
- Years active: 1989-

Ursula Dubosarsky AM is an Australian writer of fiction and non-fiction for children and young adults. She has won and been nominated for many national literary prizes, and was appointed Australian Children's Laureate for 2020–2021.

== Early life and education ==
Ursula Dubosarsky was born Ursula Coleman in 1961 in Sydney, Australia.

She attended Lindfield, Hunter's Hill, and Chatswood Primary Schools, and then SCEGGS Darlinghurst. She studied at University of Sydney and later Macquarie University.

== Academia ==
Dubosarsky has taught courses in children's literature at the University of Sydney and the University of Technology, Sydney.

As of 2020 she is an honorary associate of the Department of English at Macquarie University.

== Other activities ==
From 2016 to 2024 Dubosarsky was a member of the Library Council of New South Wales.

== Writing career ==
As of 2020 Dubosarsky is the author of over 60 illustrated books and novels, which have been translated into 17 languages.

She has also written three non-fiction Word Spy books for children, illustrated by Tohby Riddle, about language, grammar, and etymology. In the United States and Canada, The Word Spy is published under the title The Word Snoop.

=== Adaptations ===
Three of her books have been adapted for theatre: The Red Shoe, The Terrible Plop and Too Many Elephants in This House.

A theatrical work, "The Giant's Garden", based on a story by Dubosarsky (in turn inspired by Oscar Wilde) was performed at the 2026 Adelaide Festival.

== Recognition, awards, and honours ==
Dubosarsky has won many national literary prizes, including (as of 2009) five New South Wales Premier's Literary Awards, more than any other writer in the Awards' 30-year history.

Her Word Spy books have won the New South Wales Premier's Literary Award, the Children's Book Council of Australia Book of the Year Award and the Junior Judges' Award.

Her novel The Red Shoe is included in 1001 Children's Books You Must Read Before You Grow Up and is one of 200 significant works of Australian literature in the Copyright Agency's Reading Australia program.

In 2014, the annual Christmas Windows of the department store David Jones were based on her story Reindeer's Christmas Surprise, illustrated by Sue deGennaro and her book Too Many Elephants In this House, illustrated by Andrew Joyner, was chosen for the National Simultaneous Storytime. In 2018 the National Library of Australia published Midnight at the Library, illustrated by Ron Brooks, to celebrate the Library's 50-year anniversary. In 2019 a study room at Marrickville Library was named in honour of her novel The Blue Cat.

She was appointed the Australian Children's Laureate for 2020–2021. In the 2026 King's Birthday Honours, she was appointed a Member of the Order of Australia in recognition of her "significant service to literature as an author of children and young adult books". She was nominated for the 2027 Astrid Lindgren Memorial Award in the author category.

=== International ===
- Astrid Lindgren Memorial Award Nominee 2013, 2014, 2015, 2016, 2017, 2018, 2019, 2020, 2021, 2022 2023, 2024, 2025, 2026, 2027.
- Hans Christian Andersen Award Nominee
- Luchs (Lynx ) Award for Children's Literature for The Golden Day (in German Nicht Jetz, niemals)
- International Board on Books for Young People (IBBY) Honour Book List for The Golden Day
- YALSA (Division of the American Library Association) Excellence in Non-fiction for Young Adults Nominee for Word Snoop
- International Youth Library White Ravens for The First Book of Samuel; The Red Shoe; and Midnight at the Library.

=== Australian ===
- 2020–2021 – Australian Children's Laureate
- 2013 – Inducted into Speech Pathology Australia's Hall of Fame for her contribution to children's literature
- 2011 – Children's Book of the Year Award: Eve Pownall Award for Information Books for The Return of the Word Spy with illustrator Tohby Riddle
- 2009 – New South Wales Premier's Literary Award, Patricia Wrightson Prize for Young People's Literature for The Word Spy with illustrator Tohby Riddle
- 2009 – Junior Judges Project, Children's Book Council of Australia, Winner for The Word Spy with illustrator Tohby Riddle
- 2009 – Kids Own Australian Literature Award (KOALA), Picture Book Winner for Rex with illustrator David Mackintosh
- 2007 – New South Wales Premier's Literary Award, Ethel Turner Prize for Young People's Literature for The Red Shoe
- 2006 – Queensland Premier's Literary Award, Young Adult Book Award for The Red Shoe
- 2006 – New South Wales Premier's Literary Award, Ethel Turner Prize for Young People's Literature for Theodora's Gift
- 2006 – Victorian Premier's Literary Award, Prize for Young Adult Literature for Theodora's Gift
- 2001 – Adelaide Festival Awards for Literature, Award for Children's Literature for Abyssinia
- 1995 – New South Wales Premier's Literary Award, Ethnic Affairs Commission Award for The First Book of Samuel
- 1994 – New South Wales Premier's Literary Award, Ethel Turner Prize for Children's literature for The White Guinea Pig
- 1994 – Victorian Premier's Literary Award, Alan Garner Prize for Children's Literature for The White Guinea Pig

== Theatrical productions ==
- Too Many Elephants in This House at NIDA, the National Institute of Dramatic Art.
- The Red Shoe at the Jigsaw Theatre.
- Plop!, a musical version of The Terrible Plop at the Windmill Theatre in Adelaide, Brisbane and Canberra, Sydney, regional Victoria, Queensland and Darwin and the New Victory Theater in New York.
- The Giant's Garden by Slingsby theatre company at the Adelaide Festival of Arts 2025.

== Selected works ==
- Maisie and the Pinny Gig (1989) illustrated by Roberta Landers
- High Hopes (1990)
- Zizzy Zing (1991)
- The Last Week in December (1993)
- The White Guinea-Pig (1994)
- The First Book of Samuel (1995)
- Bruno and Crumhorn (1996)
- Black Sails, White Sails (1997)
- The Strange Adventures of Isador Brown (1998), illustrated by Paty Marshall-Stace
- My Father Is Not a Comedian! (1999)
- Honey and Bear (1999) illustrated by Ron Brooks
- The Even Stranger Adventures of Isador Brown (2000), illustrated by Paty Marshall-Stace
- The Game of the Goose (2000), illustrated by John Winch
- The Two Gorillas (2000), illustrated by Mitch Vane
- Fairy Bread (2001), illustrated by Mitch Vane
- Abyssinia (2001)
- The Magic Wand (2002), illustrated by Mitch Vane
- Special Days with Honey and Bear (2002) illustrated by Ron Brooks
- Isador Brown's Strangest Adventures of All (2003) illustrated by Mitch Vane
- How To Be a Great Detective (2004)
- Rex (2005) illustrated by David Mackintosh
- Theodora's Gift (2005)
- The Puppet Show (2006) illustrated by Mitch Vane
- The Red Shoe (2006)
- The Word Spy (2008) illustrated by Tohby Riddle Published in the United States as The Word Snoop (2009)
- Jerry (2008) illustrated by Patricia Mullins
- Tibby's Leaf (2009) illustrated by Peter Bray
- The Terrible Plop (2009) illustrated by Andrew Joyner
- The Cubby House (2009) illustrated by Mitch Vane
- The Deep End (2010) illustrated by Mitch Vane
- The Return of the Word Spy (2010) illustrated by Tohby Riddle
- The Honey and Bear Stories (2010) illustrated by Ron Brooks
- Free: Stories about Human Rights (2010) (contributor) Amnesty International/Walker Books UK
- The Golden Day (2011)
- The Carousel (2011) illustrated by Walter di Qual
- The Word Spy Activity Book (2012) illustrated by Tohby Riddle
- Too Many Elephants in This House (2012) illustrated by Andrew Joyner
- The Cryptic Casebook of Coco Carlomagno and Alberta: The Perplexing Pineapple (2013) illustrated by Terry Denton
- The Cryptic Casebook of Coco Carlomagno and Alberta: The Looming Lamplight (2013) illustrated by Terry Denton
- The Cryptic Casebook of Coco Carlomagno and Alberta: The Missing Mongoose (2013) illustrated by Terry Denton
- Violet Vanishes (2013) illustrated by Annie White
- Rory Rides (2013) illustrated by Annie White
- Ethan Eats (2013) illustrated by Annie White
- Ava Adds (2013) illustrated by Annie White
- Introduction to Lillypilly Hill (2013) Eleanor Spence Text Classics
- The Cryptic Casebook of Coco Carlomagno and Alberta: The Dismal Daffodil (2014) illustrated by Terry Denton
- The Cryptic Casebook of Coco Carlomagno and Alberta: The Quivering Quavers (2014) illustrated by Terry Denton
- The Cryptic Casebook of Coco Carlomagno and Alberta: The Talkative Tombstone (2014) illustrated by Terry Denton
- Two Tales of Twins from Ancient Greece and Rome (2014) illustrated by David Allan
- The Great War: Stories inspired by objects from the First World War (2014) (contributor) Walker Books UK
- Tim and Ed (2014) illustrated by Andrew Joyner
- Reindeer's Christmas Surprise (2014) illustrated by Sue de Gennaro
- One Little Goat (2017) illustrated by Andrew Joyner
- The Blue Cat (2017)
- Brindabella (2018) novel illustrated by Andrew Joyner
- Leaf Stone Beetle (2018) illustrated by Gaye Chapman
- Midnight at the Library (2018) illustrated by Ron Brooks
- The Boy Who Could Fly and other magical plays for children (2019) illustrated by Amy Golbach
- Ask Hercules Quick (2019) illustrated by Andrew Joyner
- Pierre's Not There (2020) novel illustrated by Christopher Nielsen
- The March of the Ants (2021) illustrated by Tohby Riddle
- The Magnificent Hercules Quick (2021) illustrated by Andrew Joyner
- Mary and Marcus (2022) illustrated by Andrew Joyner
- Hercules Quick's Big Bag of Tricks (2023) illustrated by Andrew Joyner
- Ethel the Penguin (2024) illustrated by Christopher Nielsen
- Yes, No, Maybe (2025) illustrated by Andrew Joyner
- Trim the Cat (2025) illustrated by Paul Lalo
- The Gifts of Reading for the Next Generation (2025; contributor of two essays)
- Life and Breath (2026; collected short stories)
- A Concise Compendium of Wonder (2026; story in a triptych)
