= Myer Christmas Parade =

Annual event in Melbourne, Australia

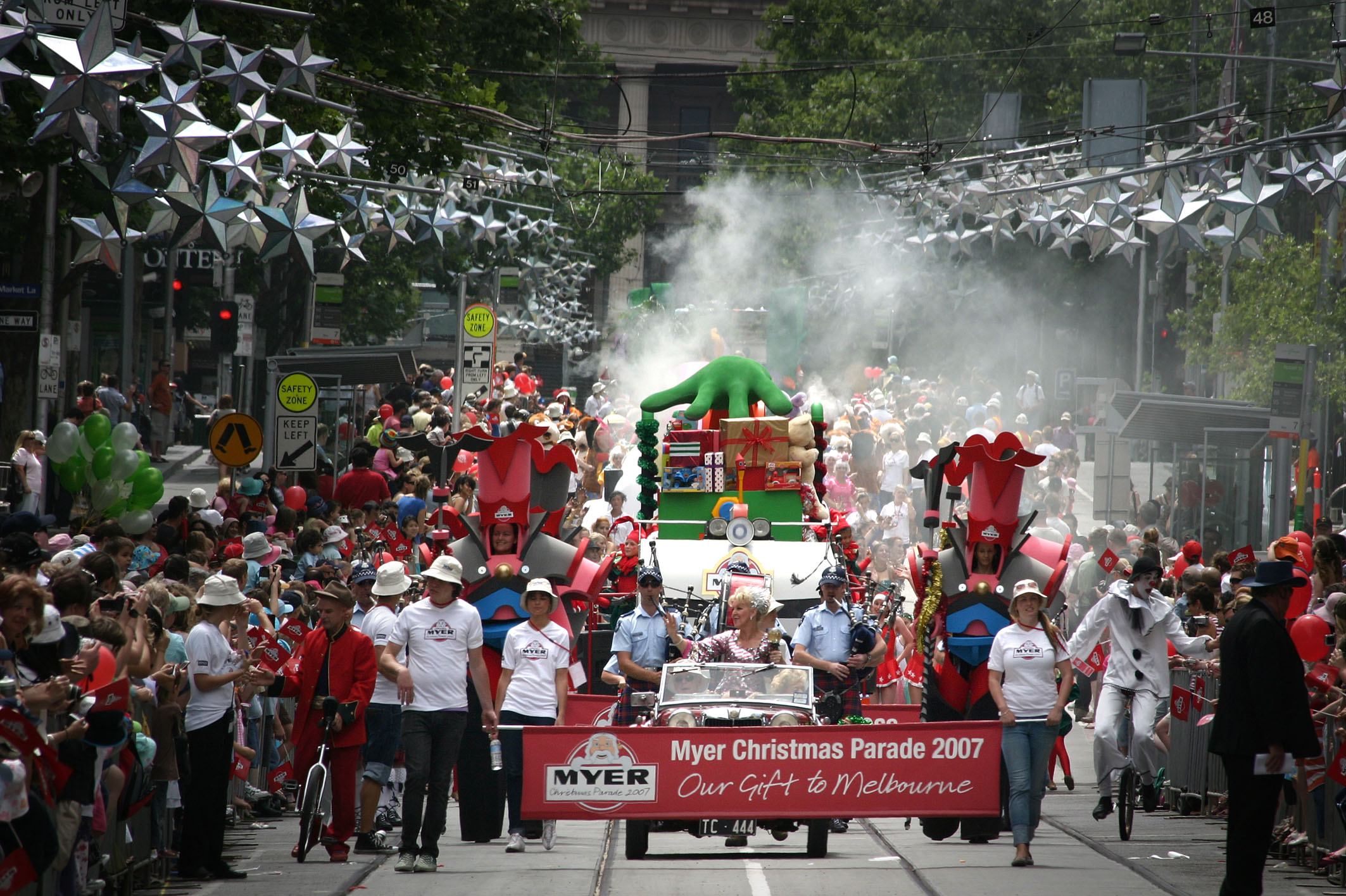
The 2007 Myer Christmas parade on Bourke St, Melbourne

The Myer Christmas Parade was an annual event held in Melbourne, Victoria, Australia. It was sponsored and organised by retailer Myer in conjunction with the City of Melbourne. The event originated in the 1950s as a push by local community and business leaders to stage an annual Chrstmas parade like those in other cities around the world. In 1954, the City Development Association and Bourke Street traders organised a parade float featuring Santa Claus, escorted by characters from Alice in Wonderland and children's cartoons. The event returned in 1955, with more floats and a temporary road closure to minimise traffic disruptions caused by crowds of onlookers.

Myer's sponsorship and organisation of the annual parade from the mid-1980s onwards saw it grow to atttact crowds of over 40,000 and up to 2,000 participants. At its peak, the event was televised by Channel 7 Melbourne and local newsreader Jennifer Keyte, with other celebrities joining the broadcast. It was also broadcast live by radio station 3AW.

The parade commenced at the top of Spring Street and ended outside Myer's Melbourne store in the Bourke Street mall. In addition to Santa Claus and a variety of Christmas-themed floats, the parade was a fixture for Melbourne's arts and culture scene, featuring local dancers, celebrities, musicians and sports stars.

Marking the commencement to the Christmas period, the parade also coincided with the opening of the Myer Christmas windows. Decorated with a different Christmas themed scene each year, the iconic Melbourne attraction drew up to 1,000,000 visitors each year.

The Myer Melbourne Christmas Parade was last staged in 2010. Since then, Myer has tried to resurrect the parade without success.

== Interstate parades ==
Myer has also sponsored Christmas parades in other Australian cities including Brisbane and Hobart. The Myer Hobart Christmas Pageant had 45 floats in 2023.
