= Life clock =

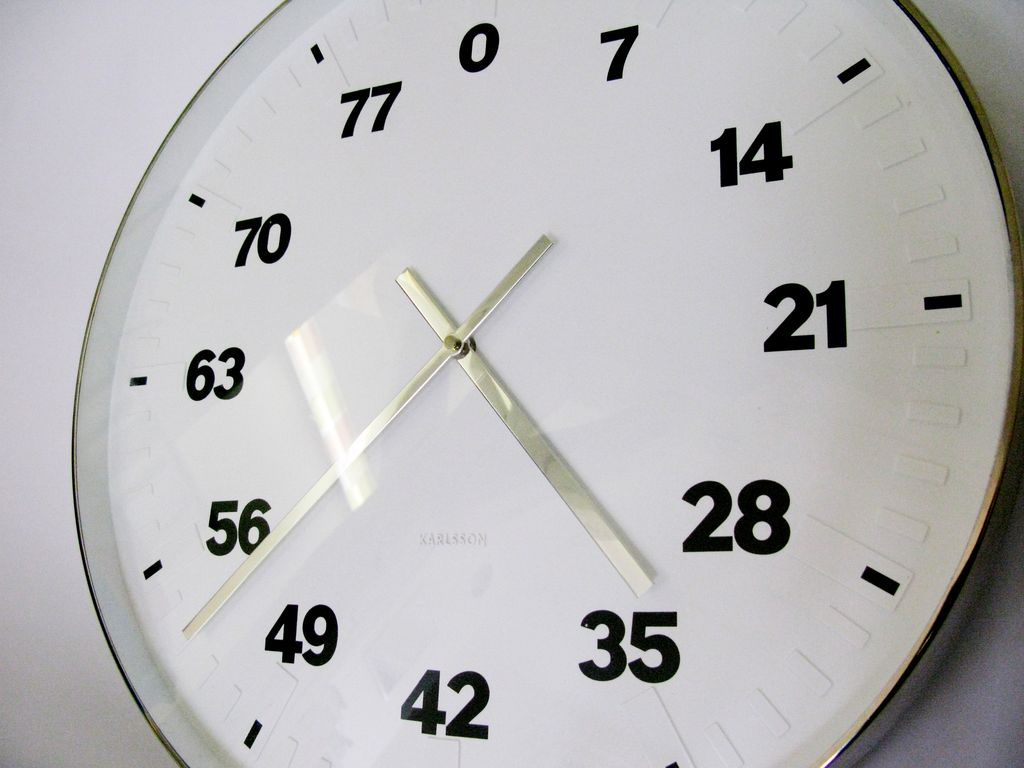
Life Clock 2 by Bertrand Planes

The Life Clock is a concept by Bertrand Planes that is marked in sevens up to eighty-four, with a mechanism slowed down 61,320 times. Each number represents a year, and a full rotation is made each 84 years (12x7=84). This was the maximum average lifespan in Europe in 2006. The numbers on a Life clock are 7, 14, 21, 28, 35, 42, 49, 56, 63, 70, 77, and 0.

== Origin ==
The life clock was originally made by Bertrand Planes in 2004. The premise of the slowed-down mechanism was based on the average lifespan of Europeans, which is 81.5 years. The life clock was first shown at "Maison: Temoins", Paris in 2004.
