= Spaeth Design =

American marketing firm

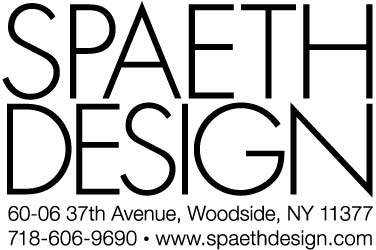
Spaeth Design Logo

Spaeth Design, Inc. is a three-dimensional marketing firm. Spaeth Design's 20,000-square-foot (1,900 m^{2}) studio is located at 60-06 37th Avenue, Woodside Queens, NY 11377.

== History ==
Spaeth Design was founded in 1945 by Walter Spaeth and his wife Dorothy. Their son, David Spaeth, is the current owner and CEO and his wife Sandy Spaeth is the president.

The company has an estimated 35 employees on staff including designers, carpenters, welders, sculptors, painters, and mechanical animators. Workers at Spaeth Design, Inc. are represented by the United Brotherhood of Carpenters and Joiners of America, Local 2870.

== Notable clients ==
The company is most widely known for being responsible for their Holiday window displays: designed, constructed, and animated for such clients as:

- Macy's
  - Animated Feature Holiday Windows at the New York City location, every year since 1999's debut of the Miracle on 34th Street.
  - Animated Feature Holiday Windows at the "Macy's North" Chicago location (previously Marshall Field's, every year since the early 1990s.
  - Animated Feature Holiday Windows at the satellite locations: Boston, Pittsburgh, Washington D.C., and Philadelphia for the Holidays every year since 2005.
  - Contribution to Spring Flower Festival window displays every year since the early 1990s.
- Lord and Taylor
  - Animated Feature Holiday Windows, every year since the 1960s.
- Saks Fifth Avenue
  - Animated Feature Holiday Windows, every year since the 1990s.
- The Home Depot
  - Seasonal Merchandising Window Displays, 5 seasons each year.
- NBC
  - Animated window display featuring miniature animated figures depicting Al Roker, Katie Couric, Matt Lauer, and Ann Curry.
- Filene's
  - Animated Feature Holiday Windows featuring Olive the other Reindeer.
- Hudson's Bay Company
  - Animated Feature Holiday Windows each year since 2005.
