= The Eleventh Hour (book) =

1989 illustrated children's book by Graeme Base

- Front cover of the 1997 edition
- Author: Graeme Base
- Illustrator: Graeme Base
- Cover artist: Graeme Base
- Language: English
- Publication date: 1989
- Publication place: Australia
- Media type: Print (hardcover)

The Eleventh Hour: A Curious Mystery is an illustrated children's book by Graeme Base. In it, Horace the Elephant holds a party for his eleventh birthday, to which he invites his ten best friends (various animals) to play eleven games and share in a feast that he has prepared. However, at the time they are to eat—11:00—they are startled to find that someone has already eaten all the food. They accuse each other until, finally, they're left puzzled as to who could have eaten it all. It is left up to the reader to solve the mystery, through careful analysis of the pictures on each page and the words in the story.

The book was a joint-winner of the "Picture Book of the Year" award from The Children's Book Council of Australia.

== History ==
Base was inspired to write the book by reading Agatha Christie novels. He travelled to Kenya and Tanzania in 1987 observing animals in game parks and collecting ideas for the book.

== Style ==
Written in rhyme, the book includes large and lavish full-page illustrations of Horace's opulent house and the events of the party, packed with hidden details. The author invites the reader to deduce the identity of the thief by examining the illustrations and making deductions and observations. Also among the details in the illustrations are hidden messages, ciphers, and codes for amateur cryptographers (for example, one page's border consists of Morse code while another page set in the ballroom contains musical clues as to which guest is guilty). The biggest and most noticeable clue lies in a paragraph of ciphertext at the end of the book, which is to be decrypted, once the reader has discovered the identity of the thief, by means of a Caesar cipher mapping A to the first letter of the guilty animal's name. The solution to the cipher confirms the answer to the puzzle and offers an additional challenge to the reader.

The final portion of the book contains the answers to almost all of the clues in the book (including the cipher), and how to solve them. These last pages are sealed together, as the reader is encouraged to try to solve the puzzles themselves first. This sealed section was absent from earlier printings of the book, but was available by mail.

Readers are able to solve the mystery either by the coded messages, analysis of the illustrations, or through the text itself.
