= Imavision =

Canadian media company

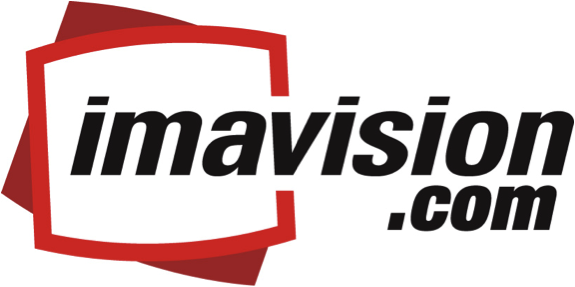
- Industry: Entertainment; DVD Distribution
- Founded: 1995
- Founder: Pierre Paquet and Gabor Kertesz
- Defunct: February 4, 2014
- Headquarters: Montreal, Quebec
- Key people: President: Pierre Paquet
- Products: DVDs; Films; Television series
- Number of employees: 24 (2010)
- Website: imavision.com (archive)

Imavision, also known as Imavision Distribution, Imavision Productions and Imavision.com, was a Canadian company recognized for the acquisition of entertainment content for DVD distribution on retail and institutional markets in Canada, the United States and French-speaking Europe. It was also an important player in the production field, namely documentary films and television series.

== History ==
Imavision Direct (direct marketing division of Imavision Distribution) logo until 2004

Imavision 21 was founded in 1995 by Pierre Paquet and the late Gabor Kertesz. The company, then located on Côte-Vertu Boulevard in Saint-Laurent, Quebec, specializes in the field of audiovisual distribution, first in VHS and later progressing to the DVD format. More specifically, Imavision acquires documentary, television series, and film rights, edits these on DVD and then insures the distribution of the products. More than a million videocassettes were sold in the first year of operation. In 1998, due to the rapid expansion of the company, Imavision 21 became Imavision Distribution and the offices moved to their present location, on Saint-Jacques Street in Montreal.

== Presentation ==
Imavision 21 was the first company in North America to promote and distribute classic (i.e. nostalgic) television series from the 1950s on VHS, in particular those from the CBC Television archives. Since then, Imavision has relinquished the outdated VHS and has focused exclusively on the DVD format.

After many important successes in DVD sales, such as Pokémon (most copies sold in pro rata to the world population), Little House on the Prairie (the classic television series most sold on DVD in North America), Alex Kovalev: My Hockey Tips and Training Methods, Quebec classics Les Belles Histoires des pays d'en haut and La Petite Vie, and a documentary film about hockey legend Guy Lafleur called Once Upon a Time...Guy Lafleur, Imavision was among the leading companies in independent French-language DVD distribution in North America. The catalog of its products contained almost 500 titles.

== Organization ==
The president, Pierre Paquet, had over 30 years of experience in marketing, and 15 years experience in television programming and distribution rights.

Imavision owned its own building where it operated, located at 1313 Saint-Jacques Street in Montreal, in the province of Quebec, in Canada. The administrative office and shipping center were situated on the premises, as well as the call center, which is open 7 days a week. The company had 24 employees working in the following fields: administration, acquisition and sales, production, stocking and shipping, direct marketing and communications.

== Imavision Productions ==
Imavision Productions started out in 1993 with the release of the VHS En pleine forme avec Mitsou, at a time when the singer Mitsou was at the height of her popularity in Quebec. The company then turned towards the production of documentaries, namely the 13 episodes of the television series Epopee en Amerique : une histoire populaire du Quebec (1997) which won 3 Prix Gemeaux, awards of excellence in television programming. The list of productions also included:

- Moi j’me fais mon cinéma (1999) the last film from late acclaimed director Gilles Carle
- Une révolution tranquille (2001)
- Boxing, What a Fight ! (2008)
- Jazz Expressions : 30 Years of Great Music (2009)
- Once Upon a Time… Guy Lafleur (2009)

== Partners ==
Imavision had alliances with Canadian, American, European and Japanese producers for the distribution on DVD of their films and television series, such as:

- Avanti Ciné-Vidéo
- BBC
- CBC Television
- Cité-Amérique
- Delphis Films
- Équipe Spectra
- Fair-Play
- Gaumont
- Granada
- Institut national de l'audiovisuel
- Incendo
- Les Films de ma vie
- Locomotion
- Media 9
- MoonScoop
- Muse
- NBC
- National Film Board of Canada
- Pixcom
- Procidis
- Productions La Fête
- Sardine Productions
- Sovimage
- TF1
- TOEI
- Vox Populi

== Insolvency ==
Following a significant decline in sales, an attempt was made to make a proposal to its creditors in September 2013. After its rejection, Imavision made an assignment in bankruptcy in February 2014. An agreement was reached to sell its catalogue of properties to Unidisc Music, which subsequently occurred in November 2014.
