= List of Australian novelists =

This is a list of novelists living in Australia or publishing significantly while living there.

== A ==
- J. H. M. Abbott (1874–1953)
- Azhar Abidi (born 1968)
- Francis Adams (1862–1893)
- Glenda Adams (1939–2007)
- Jennie Adams (born 1963)
- Debra Adelaide (born 1958)
- Alexandra Adornetto (born 1994)
- Malcolm Afford (1906–1954)
- Maggie Alderson (born 1959)
- James Aldridge (1918–2015)
- Jane Alison (born 1961)
- Chris Allen (born 1964)
- Blanche d'Alpuget (born 1944)
- Ethel Anderson (1883–1958)
- Jessica Anderson (1916–2010)
- Jim Anderson (born 1937)
- Venero Armanno (born 1959)
- Lindsay Armstrong (died 2021)
- Sarah Armstrong (born 1968)
- Keri Arthur (born 1967)
- Oscar Asche (1871–1936)
- Helen Asher (1927–2001)
- Melissa Ashley (born 1973)
- Kalinda Ashton (living)
- Leah Ashton (living)
- David Astle (born 1961)
- Thea Astley (1925–2004)
- Tilly Aston (1873–1947)
- Hugh Atkinson (1924–1994)
- Louisa Atkinson (1834–1872)
- Bunty Avieson (born 1962)

== B ==
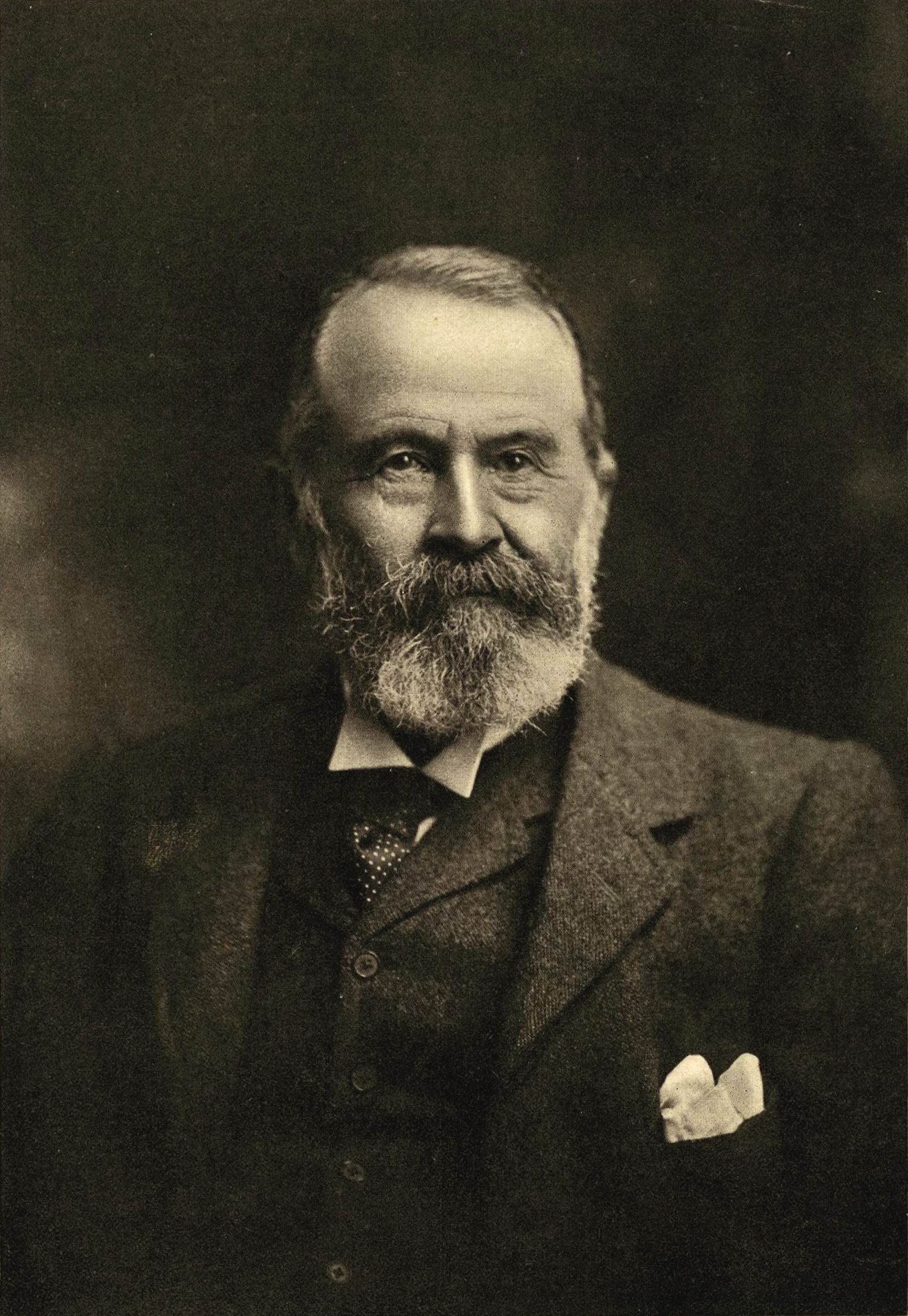
Rolf Boldrewood

- Gregory Victor Babic (1963–2013)
- Elizabeth Backhouse (1917–2013)
- Van Badham (born 1974)
- Murray Bail (born 1941)
- Allan Baillie (born 1943)
- Margaret Balderson (born 1935)
- Faith Bandler (1918–2015)
- Marjorie Barnard (1897–1987)
- Robert G. Barrett (1942–2012)
- John Arthur Barry (1850–1911)
- Max Barry (born 1973)
- Catherine Bateson (born 1960)
- Alan Baxter (born 1970)
- John Baxter (born 1939)
- William Baylebridge (1883–1942)
- Barbara Baynton (1857–1929)
- Richard Beasley (born 1964)
- George Lewis Becke (1855–1913)
- Jean Bedford (1946–2025)
- K. A. Bedford (born 1963)
- Randolph Bedford (1868–1941)
- George Beeby (1869–1942)
- Larissa Behrendt (born 1969)
- Diane Bell (born 1943)
- Herz Bergner (1907–1970)
- Patricia Bernard (born 1942)
- Helen Bianchin (born 1939)
- Barbara Biggs (born 1956)
- John B. Biggs (born 1934)
- Carmel Bird (born 1940)
- Winifred Birkett (1897–1975)
- John Birmingham (born 1964)
- Dora Birtles (1903–1992)
- K. J. Bishop (living)
- Emily Bitto (living)
- Marie Bjelke-Petersen (1874–1969)
- Estelle Blackburn (born 1950)
- Georgia Blain (1964–2016)
- Ally Blake (living)
- Godfrey Blunden (1906–1996)
- Capel Boake (1889–1944)
- Merlinda Bobis (born 1959), Filipino expatriate
- Ralph de Boissière (1907–2008)
- Rolf Boldrewood (Thomas Alexander Browne) (1826–1915)
- Ian Bone (born 1956)
- Alison Booth (living)
- Guy Boothby (1867–1905)
- Gillian Bouras (born 1945)
- Martin Boyd (1893–1972)
- Russell Braddon (1921–1995)
- James Bradley (born 1967)
- Bertha Southey Brammall (1878–1957)
- Lily Brett (born 1946)
- Hesba Fay Brinsmead (1922–2003)
- Chris Broadribb (living)
- Damien Broderick (1944–2025)
- Steve Brook (1934–2014), Polish-born journalist and satirical novelist
- Geraldine Brooks (born 1955)
- Karen Brooks (born 1954)
- Anne Brooksbank (born 1943)
- John Brosnan (1947–2005)
- Carter Brown (1923–1985)
- Honey Brown (living)
- Max Brown (1916–2003)
- Marshall Browne (1935–2014)
- Mary Grant Bruce (1878–1958)
- Alyssa Brugman (born 1974)
- Anne Buist (living)
- Anna Maria Bunn (1808–1889)
- Janine Burke (born 1952)
- William Aubrey Burnage (1824–1902)
- Nathan Burrage (born 1971)
- Deborah Burrows (born 1959)
- Alex Buzo (1944–2006)
- Liz Byrski (born 1944)

== C ==
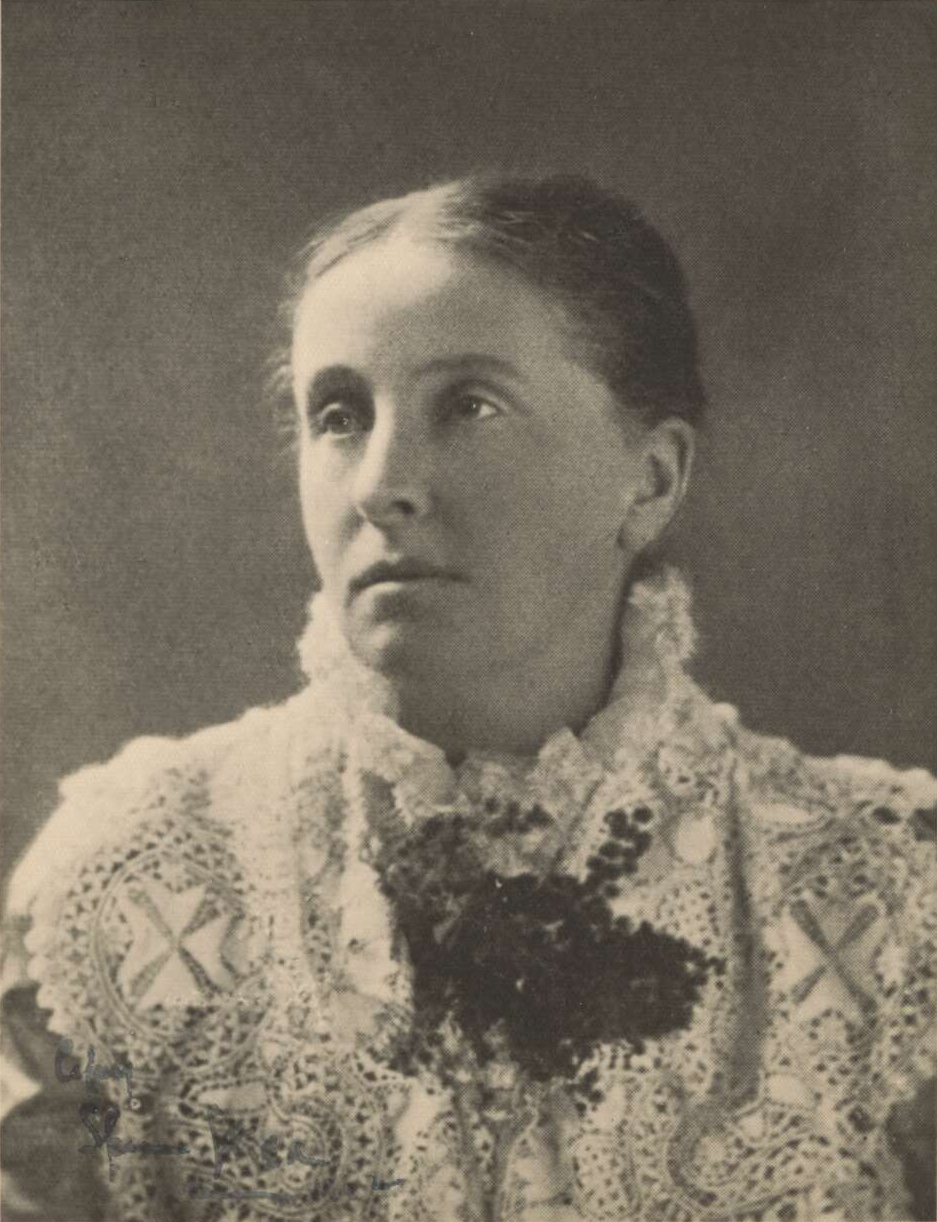
Ada Cambridge

- Kathleen Caffyn (c. 1855–1926)
- Mena Calthorpe (1905–1996)
- Ada Cambridge (1844–1926)
- Marion May Campbell (born 1948)
- Alice Campion, pseudonym for group writing collaboratively since 2010
- Trudi Canavan (born 1969)
- Leslie Cannold (born 1970)
- Gabrielle Carey (1959–2023), Puberty Blues
- Peter Carey (born 1943)
- Patricia Carlon (1927–2002)
- Isobelle Carmody (born 1958)
- Jane Caro (born 1957)
- Steven Carroll (born 1949)
- Paul D. Carter (born 1980)
- Caroline Carver (born 1959)
- Jay Caselberg (born 1958)
- Deirdre Cash (1924–1963)
- Belinda Castles (born 1971)
- Brian Castro (born 1950)
- Nancy Cato (1917–2000)
- Nick Cave (born 1957)
- Arlene J. Chai (born 1955)
- Joy Chambers (1947–2023)
- Nan Chauncy (1900–1970)
- Ellen Clacy (1830–1901)
- John Clanchy (born 1943)
- Margaret Clark (born 1942)
- Hugh V. Clarke (1919–1996)
- Marcus Clarke (1846–1881)
- James Clavell (1924–1994)
- Alan Clay (born 1954)
- Jon Cleary (1917–2010)
- Charmian Clift (1923–1969)
- Jane Clifton (born 1949)
- Robert Close (1903–1995)
- Constance Clyde (1872–1951)
- J. M. Coetzee (born 1940), South African-born, emigrated to Australia in 2002
- Bernard Cohen (born 1963)
- Alan Collins (1928–2008)
- Dale Collins (1897–1956)
- Jennifer Compton (born 1949)
- Matthew Condon (born 1962)
- Kate Constable (born 1966)
- Kenneth Cook (1929–1987)
- Selma Cook (born 1961)
- Beatriz Copello (living)
- Gary Corby (born 1963)
- Peter Corris (1942–2018)
- Colin Cotterill (born 1952)
- Dorothy Cottrell (1902–1957)
- Bryce Courtenay (1933–2012)
- Jessie Catherine Couvreur (1848–1897)
- James Cowan (1942–2018)
- Alice Guerin Crist (1876–1941)
- Alison Croggon (born 1962)
- Bernard Cronin (1884–1968)
- M. T. C. Cronin (born 1963)
- Zora Cross (1890–1964)
- Cath Crowley (born 1971)
- Sophie Cunningham (born 1963)
- Jean Curlewis (1898–1930)
- Dymphna Cusack (1902–1981)

== D ==
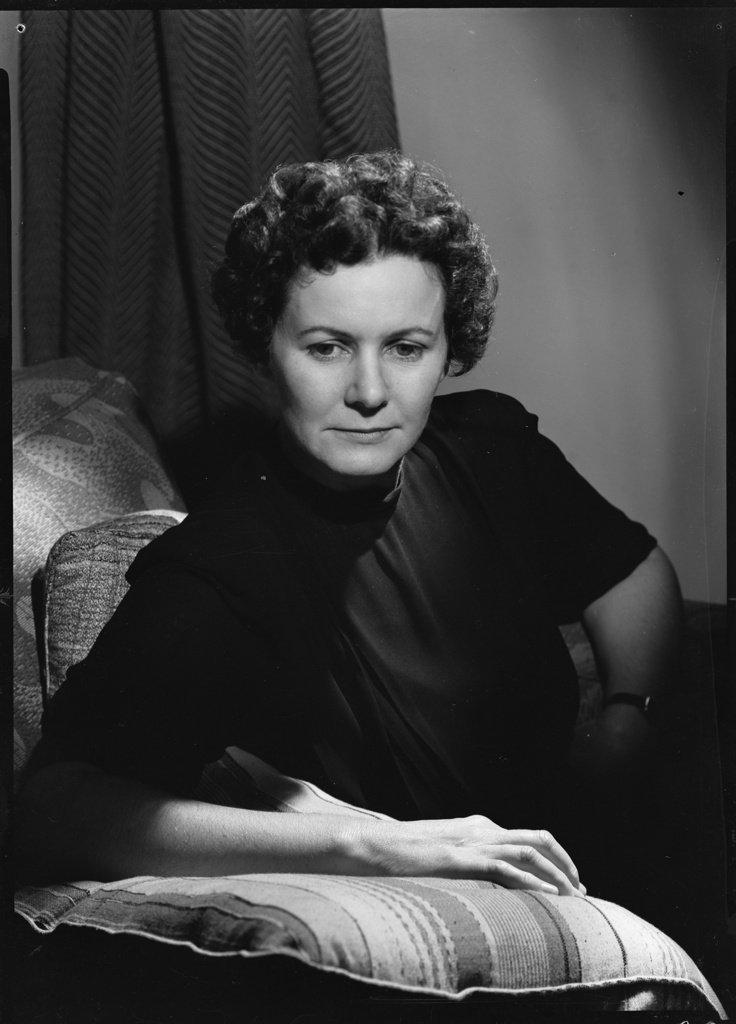
Eleanor Dark

- John Bede Dalley (1876–1935)
- Trent Dalton (born 1979)
- Stephen Dando-Collins (born 1950)
- Lilian Darcy (born 1958)
- Eleanor Dark (1901–1985)
- Cecilia Dart-Thornton (living)
- Helen Darville (Helen Demidenko) (born 1972)
- Harriet Miller Davidson (1839–1883)
- Luke Davies (born 1962)
- Brooke Davis (born 1980)
- Frank Dalby Davison (1893–1970)
- Liam Davison (1957–2014)
- Ellen Davitt (1812–1879)
- Carlton Dawe (1865–1935)
- Gregory Day (living)
- Tegan Bennett Daylight (born 1969)
- Dulcie Deamer (1890–1972)
- Joel Deane (born 1969)
- Kathryn Deans (living)
- Michelle de Kretser (born 1957)
- Meaghan Delahunt (born 1961)
- David Denholm (1924–1997)
- Kit Denton (1928–1997)
- Robert Dessaix (born 1944)
- Jessica Dettmann (living)
- James Devaney (1890–1976)
- Jean Devanny (1894–1962)
- Joyce Dingwell (1908–1997)
- Garry Disher (born 1949)
- András Domahidy (1920–2012)
- Bronwyn Donaghy (1948–2002)
- Albert Dorrington (1874–1953)
- Jane Doudy (1846–1932)
- Sara Douglass (1957–2011)
- Jon Doust (born 1948)
- Ceridwen Dovey (born 1980)
- Sara Dowse (born 1938)
- Phil Doyle (born 1967)
- Simon Drake (born 1975)
- Henrietta Drake-Brockman (1901–1968)
- Robert Drewe (born 1943)
- Neal Drinnan (born 1964)
- Ursula Dubosarsky (born 1961)
- Alasdair Duncan (born 1982)
- Susan Duncan (1951–2024)
- Mary Durack (1913–1994)

== E ==
- Nick Earls (born 1963)
- Anthony Eaton (born 1972)
- Arabella Edge (living)
- Greg Egan (born 1961)
- Flora Eldershaw (1897–1956)
- M. Barnard Eldershaw, pseudonym for Flora Eldershaw (1897–1956) and Marjorie Barnard (1897–1987)
- Sumner Locke Elliott (1917–1991)
- Will Elliott (born 1979)
- Ben Elton (born 1959)
- Edith Mary England (1899–1979/1981)
- Fotini Epanomitis (born 1969)
- Justine Ettler (born 1965)
- Matilda Jane Evans (1827–1886)
- John K. Ewers (1904–1978)

== F ==
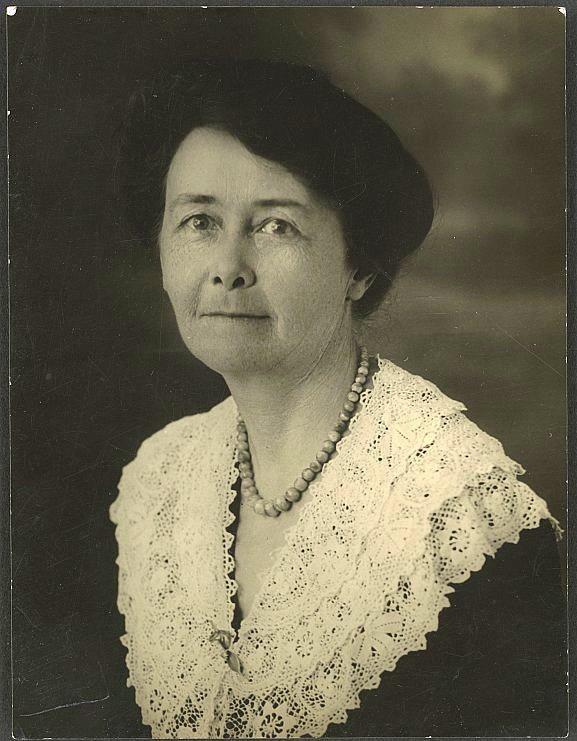
Miles Franklin

- Michel Faber (born 1960)
- Diane Fahey (born 1945)
- Colin Falconer (born 1953)
- Delia Falconer (born 1966)
- Kim Falconer (born 1954)
- Suzanne Falkiner (born 1952)
- Jennifer Fallon (born 1959)
- Margaret Fane (1887–1962)
- Beverley Farmer (1941–2018)
- Tracy Farr (born 1962)
- George Farwell (1911–1976)
- Annah Faulkner (died 2022)
- Joanne Fedler (born 1967)
- Elizabeth Fensham (born 1953)
- Karen Lee Field (born 1961)
- Jeremy Fisher (born 1954)
- Helen FitzGerald (born 1966)
- Ross Fitzgerald (born 1944)
- John Flanagan (1944–2026)
- Penny Flanagan (born 1970)
- Richard Flanagan (born 1961)
- William Fleming (1874–1961)
- Tom Flood (born 1955)
- Pat Flower (1914–1977)
- Mabel Forrest (1872–1935)
- Thelma Forshaw (1923–1995)
- Kate Forsyth (born 1966)
- Mary Fortune (c. 1833–1911)
- David Foster (born 1944)
- Grant Foster (born 1945)
- Lynn Foster (1914–1985)
- Candice Fox (born 1985)
- Judith Fox (born 1959)
- Kathryn Fox (born 1966)
- Karen Foxlee (born 1971)
- David Francis (born 1958)
- Miles Franklin (1879–1954)
- Jackie French (born 1953)
- Peggy Frew (born 1976)
- Mary Eliza Fullerton (1868–1946)
- Anna Funder (born 1966)
- Joseph Furphy (1843–1912)
- Sandy Fussell (born 1960)

== G ==
- Antonella Gambotto-Burke (born 1965)
- Nene Gare (1919–1994)
- Doris Pilkington Garimara (1937–2014)
- Helen Garner (born 1942)
- Catherine Gaskin (1929–2009)
- Mary Gaunt (1861–1942)
- Susan Geason (born 1946)
- Nikki Gemmell (born 1966)
- Doris Gentile (1894–1972)
- Sulari Gentill (living)
- Leah Giarratano (living)
- Mollie Gillen (1908–2009)
- Samantha Gillison (born 1967)
- Ruby Langford Ginibi (1934–2011)
- Gerald Glaskin (1923–2000)
- Jane Godwin (born 1964)
- Alan Gold (1945–2024)
- Goldie Goldbloom (born 1964)
- Andrea Goldsmith (born 1950)
- Anna Goldsworthy (born 1974)
- Peter Goldsworthy (born 1951)
- Jane R. Goodall (born 1951)
- W. T. Goodge (1862–1909)
- Alison Goodman (born 1966)
- Kate Gordon (born 1982)
- Alan Gould (born 1949)
- Nathaniel Gould (1857–1919)
- Janet Gover (living)
- Posie Graeme-Evans (born 1952)
- Richard Harry Graves (1897–1971)
- Evan Green (1930–1996)
- John M. Green (born 1953)
- Kerry Greenwood (1954–2025)
- Kate Grenville (born 1950)
- Andrew Griffiths (born c. 1966)
- Andy Griffiths (born 1961)
- Ann Grocott (born 1938)
- Alma De Groen (born 1941)
- Dick Gross (born 1954)
- Glenda Guest (living)
- Mrs Aeneas Gunn (Jeannie Gunn) (1870–1961)
- Phillip Gwynne (born 1958)

== H ==
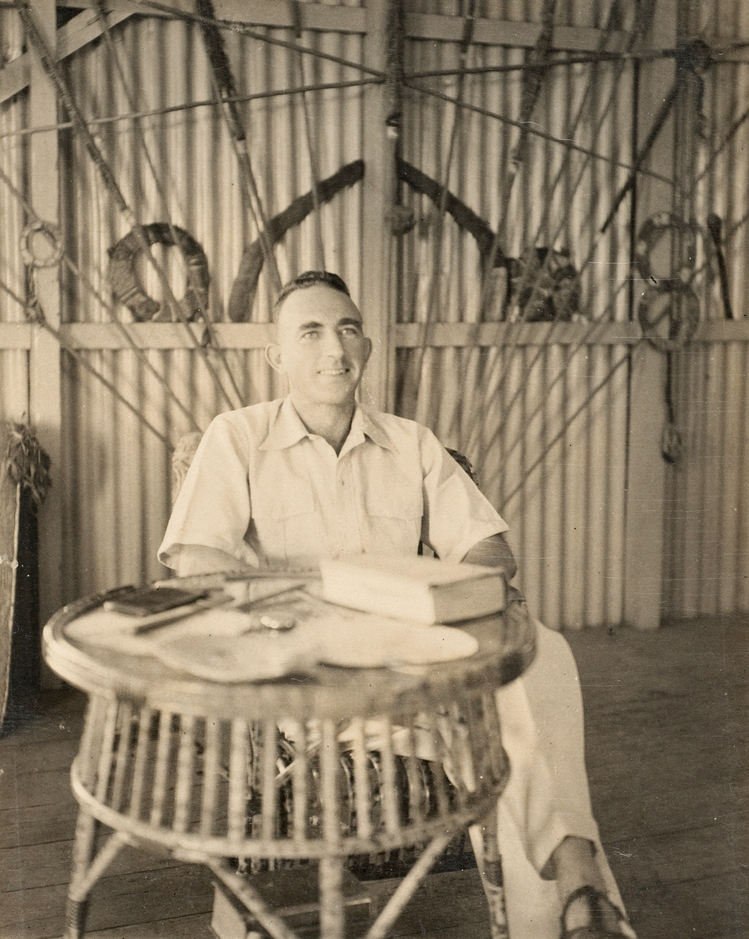
Xavier Herbert

- Adrian d'Hagé (born 1946)
- Alfred Arthur Greenwood Hales (1860–1936)
- Rodney Hall (born 1935)
- Vic Hall (1896–1972)
- Marion Halligan (1940–2024)
- Rosalie Ham (born 1955)
- Alex Hammond (born 1975)
- Susan Hampton (born 1949)
- Barbara Hannay (living)
- Barbara Hanrahan (1939–1991)
- Derek Hansen (born 1944)
- J. M. Harcourt (1902–1971)
- Lee Harding (1937–2023)
- Traci Harding, (born 1964), fantasy
- Frank Hardy (1917–1994), Power Without Glory
- Lesbia Harford (1891–1927)
- Margaret Packham Hargrave (born 1941)
- Richard Harland (born 1947)
- Beverley Harper (1943–2002)
- Alexander Harris (1805–1874)
- Christine Harris (born 1955)
- Jennifer Harrison (born 1955)
- Elizabeth Harrower (1928–2020)
- Sonya Hartnett (born 1968)
- John Harwood (born 1946)
- Nicholas Hasluck (born 1942)
- William Hay (1875–1945)
- Les Haylen (1898–1977)
- Simon Haynes (living)
- Shirley Hazzard (1931–2016)
- Jack Heath (born 1986)
- Ruth Hegarty (born 1929)
- Rolf Heimann (born 1940)
- Anita Heiss (born 1968)
- Lin Van Hek (born 1944)
- Norma K. Hemming (1928–1960)
- John David Hennessey (1847–1935)
- Sally Hepworth (born 1980)
- Xavier Herbert (1901–1984)
- Jason Herbison (born 1972)
- Dorothy Hewett (1923–2002)
- Kathryn Heyman (born 1965)
- Jack Hibberd (1940–2024)
- Jennifer Higgie (living)
- Simon Higgins (born 1958)
- Ernestine Hill (1899–1972)
- Helen Hodgman (1945–2022)
- Patrick Holland (born 1977)
- Ada Augusta Holman (1869–1949)
- Chloe Hooper (born 1973)
- Sarah Hopkins (born 1969)
- Janette Turner Hospital (born 1942)
- Shirley Fenton Huie (1924–2016)
- Fergus Hume (1859–1932)
- Tom Hungerford (1915–2011)
- Bem Le Hunte (born 1964)
- Andrew Hutchinson (born 1979)
- Adrian Hyland (born 1954)
- M. J. Hyland (born 1968)

== I ==
- David Ireland (1927–2022)
- Ian Irvine (born 1950)
- Stephen M. Irwin (born 1966)

== J ==
- Antoni Jach (born 1956)
- Linda Jaivin (born 1955)
- Florence James (1902–1993)
- Wendy James (born 1966)
- Winifred Lewellin James (1876–1941)
- Trent Jamieson (living)
- Emma Jane (born 1969)
- Charlotte Jay (1919–1996)
- Barbara Jefferis (1917–2004)
- Kate Jennings (1948–2021)
- Paul Jennings (born 1943)
- Alexandra Joel (born 1953)
- Madeleine St John (1941–2006)
- Rebecca Johnson (born 1966)
- Susan Johnson (born 1956)
- Dorothy Johnston (born 1948)
- George Johnston (1912–1970)
- Martin Johnston (1947–1990)
- Elizabeth Jolley (1923–2007)
- Gail Jones (born 1955)
- Margaret Jones (1923–2006)
- Rae Desmond Jones (1941–2017)
- Rod Jones (born 1953)
- Toni Jordan (born 1966)
- Nicholas Jose (born 1952)
- Mireille Juchau (born 1969)

== K ==
- Elizabeth Kata (1912–1998)
- Louise Katz (living)
- Louis Kaye (1901–1981)
- Christopher Kelen (born 1958)
- Cate Kendall, pseudonym of Michelle Hamer and Lisa Blundell
- Thomas Keneally (born 1935)
- Cate Kennedy (born 1963)
- Chris Kennedy (1948–2013)
- Hannah Kent (born 1985)
- Christopher Kenworthy (born 1968)
- Michael Keon (1918–2006)
- Adib Khan (living)
- Paul Kidd (living)
- Robin Klein (born 1936)
- Elsa Klensch (1933–2022)
- Kris Kneen (born 1968)
- Marion Knowles (1865–1949)
- Malcolm Knox (born 1966)
- Peter Kocan (born 1947)
- Christopher Koch (1932–2013)
- Will Kostakis (born 1989)
- Nigel Krauth (born 1949)
- Michelle de Kretser (born 1957)
- Torsten Krol (living)
- Ambelin Kwaymullina (born 1975)

== L ==
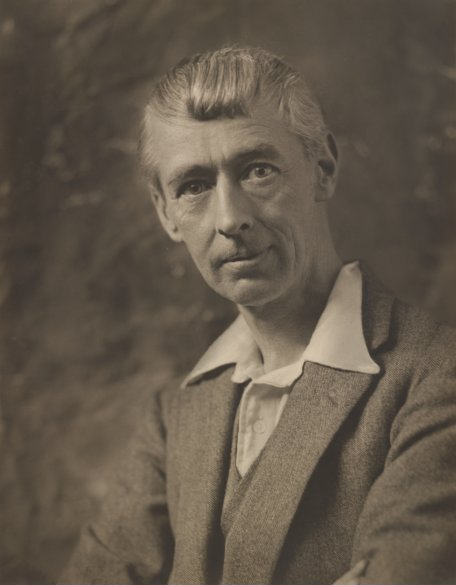
Norman Lindsay

- Sofie Laguna (born 1968)
- Eric Lambert (1918–1966)
- Henry George Lamond (1885–1969)
- John Lang (1816–1864)
- Eve Langley (1904–1974)
- Coral Lansbury (1929–1991)
- Justine Larbalestier (born 1967)
- Glenda Larke (living)
- John Larkin (born 1963)
- Stephanie Laurens (born 1953)
- Will Lawson (1876–1957)
- Simone Lazaroo (born 1961)
- Bill Leak (1956–2017)
- Caroline Woolmer Leakey (1827–1881)
- Miranda Lee (1945–2021)
- Julia Leigh (born 1970)
- Marion Lennox (born 1953)
- Kathy Lette (born 1958)
- Robin Levett (1925–2008)
- Joan Lindsay (1896–1984)
- Norman Lindsay (1879–1969)
- Marie Lion (1855–1922)
- Sumner Locke (1881–1917)
- Hilary Lofting (1881–1939)
- Amanda Lohrey (born 1947)
- Kathryn Lomer (born 1958)
- Joan London (born 1948)
- Mic Looby (born 1969)
- Julienne van Loon (born 1970)
- Gabrielle Lord (born 1946)
- Angelo Loukakis (born 1951)
- Lennie Lower (1903–1947)
- Melissa Lucashenko (born 1967)
- Dave Luckett (born 1951)
- Morris Lurie (1938–2014)

== M ==
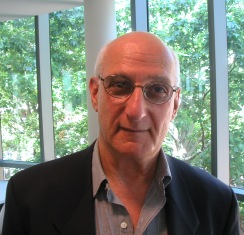
David Malouf

- Mary-Rose MacColl (born 1961)
- Michael MacConnell (living)
- J. E. Macdonnell (1917–2002)
- Louise Mack (1870–1935)
- Hugh Mackay (born 1938)
- Dorothea Mackellar (1885–1968)
- Kenneth (Seaforth) Mackenzie (1913–1955)
- Doug MacLeod (1959–2021)
- Anthony Macris (born 1962)
- Emily Maguire (born 1976)
- Jennifer Maiden (born 1949)
- Barry Maitland (born 1941)
- Angela Malone (born 1971)
- Shane Maloney (born 1953), crime fiction
- David Malouf (1934–2026)
- Leonard Mann (1895–1981)
- Frederic Manning (1882–1935)
- Melina Marchetta (born 1965)
- Juliet Marillier (born 1948)
- John Marsden (1950–2024)
- William Leonard Marshall (1944–2003)
- Catherine Edith Macauley Martin (1847–1937)
- David Martin (1915–1997)
- Kain Massin (living)
- Olga Masters (1919–1986)
- Andrew Masterson (born 1961)
- Peter Mathers (1931–2004)
- Brian Matthews (1936–2022)
- Christobel Mattingley (1931–2019)
- Constance Jane McAdam (1872–1951)
- Maxine McArthur (born 1962)
- Brett McBean (born 1978)
- A. L. McCann (born 1966)
- Andrew McCann (living)
- Mardi McConnochie (born 1971)
- George Gordon McCrae (1833–1927)
- Georgiana Huntly McCrae (1804–1890)
- Colleen McCullough (1937–2015)
- Sandy McCutcheon (born 1947)
- Kirstyn McDermott (living)
- Damian McDonald (born 1969)
- Nan McDonald (1921–1974)
- Roger McDonald (born 1941)
- Fiona McFarlane (born 1978)
- Andrew McGahan (1966–2019)
- Geoffrey McGeachin (born 1949)
- Fiona Kelly McGregor (born 1965)
- Michael McGuire (living)
- Fiona McIntosh (born 1960)
- Edith McKay (1891–1963)
- Chuck McKenzie (born 1970)
- Ronald McKie (1909–1991)
- Tamara McKinley (born 1948)
- Rhyll McMaster (born 1947)
- Claire McNab (1940–2022)
- James McQueen (1934–1998)
- Geoffrey McSkimming (born 1962)
- Foz Meadows (born 1986)
- Leonard Frank Meares (1921–1993)
- Gillian Mears (1964–2016)
- Wolla Meranda (1863–1951)
- Gwen Meredith (1907–2006)
- Louisa Anne Meredith (1812–1895)
- Alex Miller (born 1936)
- Karen Miller (living)
- Jennifer Mills (born 1977)
- Paul Mitchell (born 1968)
- Drusilla Modjeska (born 1946)
- Ian Moffitt (1926–2000)
- James Moloney (born 1954)
- Scott Monk (born 1974)
- Josephine Moon (living)
- Ray Mooney (born 1945)
- Finola Moorhead (born 1947)
- Frank Moorhouse (1938–2022)
- Michael Moran (born 1947)
- Sally Morgan (born 1951)
- Jaclyn Moriarty (born 1968)
- Liane Moriarty (born 1966)
- Heather Morris (born 1953)
- Myra Morris (1893–1966)
- John Morrison (1904–1998)
- Sally Morrison (born 1946)
- Di Morrissey (born 1948)
- Kate Morton (born 1976)
- Mudrooroo (1938–2019) (formerly Colin Johnson)
- Nina Murdoch (1890–1976)
- Gerald Murnane (born 1939)
- Sally Murphy (born 1968)
- Kirsty Murray (born 1960)
- Joanna Murray-Smith (born 1962)

== N ==
- Jill Neville (1932–1997)
- Simpson Newland (1835–1925)
- Nerida Newton (born 1972)
- John Henry Nicholson (1838–1923)
- Harry Nicolaides (born 1967/1968)
- Karen Simpson Nikakis (living)
- D'Arcy Niland (1919–1967)
- Hume Nisbet (1849–1923)
- Cynthia Reed Nolan (1908–1976)
- Michael Noonan (1921–2000)
- Louis Nowra (born 1950)
- Judy Nunn (born 1945)
- Malla Nunn (born 1963)

== O ==
- Barry Oakley (born 1931)
- Elizabeth O'Conner (1913–2000)
- Andrew O'Connor (born 1978)
- Mary-Anne O'Connor (living)
- John O'Grady (1907–1981)
- Cassandra O'Leary (living)
- Ernest Henry Clark Oliphant (1862–1936)
- Kristina Olsson (born 1956)
- Anthony O'Neill (born 1964)
- Paddy O'Reilly (living)
- Kate Orman (born 1968)
- Stephen Orr (born 1967)
- Wendy Orr (born 1968), Canadian-born
- Joanne van Os (born 1955)
- Beatrice Osborn (1887–1962)
- Harrison Owen (1890–1966)
- June Duncan Owen (living)
- Boyd Oxlade (1943–2014)

== P ==
- Robert Potter (1831-1908)
- Vance Palmer (1885–1959)
- Susan Parisi (born 1958)
- Ruth Park (1923–2010)
- Catherine Langloh Parker (c. 1855–1940)
- Julia Parker (born 1932)
- Favel Parrett (born 1974)
- Anne Spencer Parry (1931–1985)
- Valerie Parv (1951–2021)
- Judy Pascoe (living)
- A. S. Patrić (living)
- Pyotr Patrushev (1942–2016)
- Brian Penton (1904–1951)
- Elliot Perlman (born 1964)
- Mary K. Pershall (born 1951)
- Marie Bjelke Petersen (1874–1969)
- Hoa Pham (living)
- James Phelan (born 1979)
- Nancy Phelan (1913–2008)
- Phyllis Piddington (1910–2001)
- D.B.C. Pierre (born 1961)
- Geoffry Morgan Pike (1929–2018)
- Gillian Polack (born 1961)
- Dorothy Porter (1954–2008)
- Hal Porter (1911–1984)
- Rosa Praed (1851–1935)
- Ambrose Pratt (1874–1944)
- Katharine Susannah Prichard (1883–1969)
- Alice Pung (born 1981)

== Q ==
- Roderic Quinn (1867–1949)

== R ==
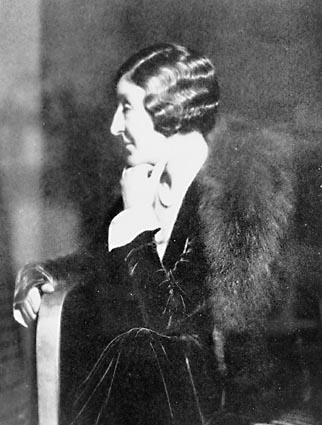
Henry Handel Richardson

- Vivienne Rae-Ellis (1930–2015)
- Leslie Alfred Redgrave (1882–1956)
- Leigh Redhead (born 1971)
- Gayla Reid (born 1945)
- Matthew Reilly (born 1974)
- David Reiter (born 1947)
- Ethel Richardson (1870–1946)
- Henry Handel Richardson (1870–1946)
- Christopher Ride (born 1965)
- Mirandi Riwoe (living)
- Peter Robb (born 1946)
- Gregory David Roberts (born 1952)
- Deborah Robertson (born 1959)
- Kel Robertson (born 1950s)
- Michael Robotham (born 1960)
- Luke Romyn (born 1975)
- Heather Rose (born 1964)
- Peter Rose (born 1955)
- Alice Grant Rosman (1882–1961)
- Jane Routley (born 1962)
- Jennifer Rowe (born 1948)
- Tracy Ryan (born 1964)

== S ==
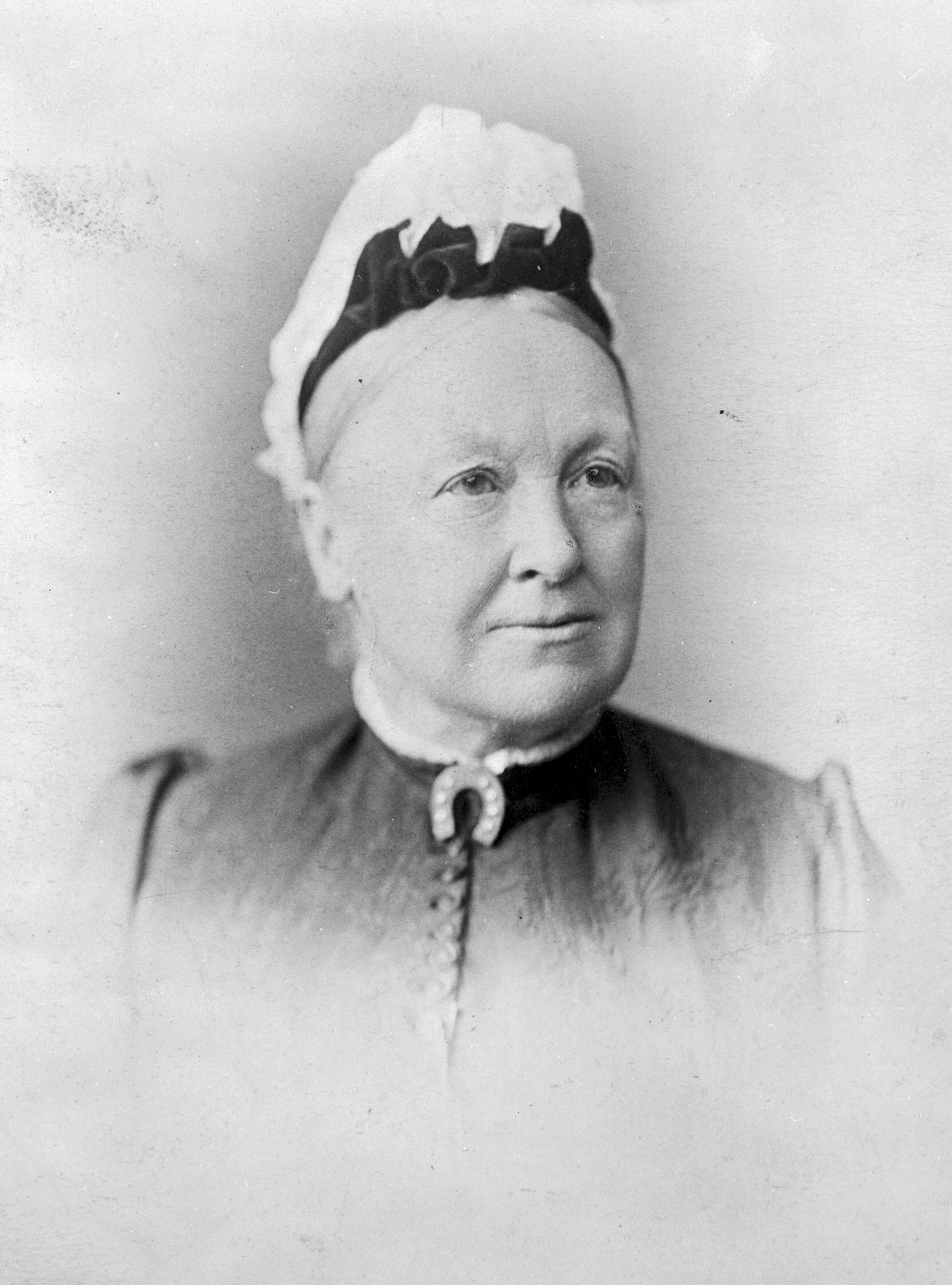
Catherine Helen Spence

- Eva Sallis (born 1964)
- Philip Salom (born 1950)
- Dorothy Lucy Sanders (1907–1987)
- G K Saunders (1910–2005)
- Henry Savery (1791–1842)
- Conrad Sayce (1888–1966)
- Mandy Sayer (born 1963)
- Wendy Scarfe (born 1933)
- Katherine Scholes (born 1959)
- George Firth Scott (1862–1935)
- John A. Scott (born 1948)
- Kim Scott (born 1957)
- Phillip Scott (born 1952)
- Rosie Scott (1948–2017)
- Stephen Sewell (born 1953)
- Alan Seymour (1927–2015)
- Thomas Shapcott (born 1935)
- Lionel Shave (1888–1954)
- Charles Herbert Shaw (1900–1955)
- Patricia Shaw (1929–2024)
- Nevil Shute (1899–1960)
- Craig Silvey (born 1982)
- Helen de Guerry Simpson (1897–1940)
- Lindsay Simpson (born 1957)
- Graeme Simsion (living)
- Tim Sinclair (born 1972)
- Gaele Sobott (born 1956)
- Edward Sorenson (1869–1939)
- Tracy Sorensen (1963–2025)
- Catherine Helen Spence (1825–1910)
- Eleanor Spence (1928–2008)
- Ken Spillman (born 1959)
- Kimberley Starr (born 1970)
- Nicolette Stasko (born 1950)
- Christina Stead (1902–1983)
- Gordon Neil Stewart (1912–1999)
- Kathleen Stewart (born 1958)
- Dal Stivens (1911–1997)
- Louis Stone (1871–1935)
- Randolph Stow (1935–2010)
- Donald Stuart (1913–1983)
- Pat Studdy-Clift (1925–2017)
- Nike Sulway (born 1968)

== T ==
- Anna Tambour (living)
- Shaun Tan (born 1974)
- Cory Taylor (1955–2016)
- Kay Glasson Taylor (1893–1998)
- Keith Taylor (born 1946)
- Peter Temple (1946–2018)
- Kylie Tennant (1912–1988)
- Colin Thiele (1920–2006)
- Estelle Thompson (1930–2003)
- Holly Throsby (born 1978)
- Ric Throssell (1922–1999)
- F. J. Thwaites (1908–1979)
- Carrie Tiffany (born 1965)
- Harry Tighe (1877–1946)
- E. V. Timms (1895–1960)
- Steve Toltz (born 1972)
- Glen Tomasetti (1929–2003)
- P. L. Travers (1899–1996)
- Rachael Treasure (born 1968)
- Penelope Trevor (born 1960)
- Pepe Trevor (born 1960)
- Nigel Triffitt (1949–2012)
- Christos Tsiolkas (born 1965)
- Lee Tulloch (born 1954), Fabulous Nobodies
- John A. Tully (born 1947)
- Ethel Turner (1873–1958)
- George Turner (1916–1997)
- Lilian Turner (1867–1956)

== U ==
- Arthur Upfield (1890–1964)
- Jessie Urquhart (1890–1948)
- Rod Usher (born 1946)

== V ==
- Elise Valmorbida (living)
- Joanne van Os (born 1955)
- F. B. Vickers (1903–1985) (Frederick Bert)
- Mary Theresa Vidal (1815–1873)

== W ==
- Murray Waldren (living)
- Robert Wales (1924–1994)
- Brenda Walker (1957–2024)
- Joe Walker (1910–1971)
- Kath Walker (1920–1993)
- Lucy Walker (1907–1987)
- Sarah Walker (born 1965)
- Vivienne Wallington (born 1937)
- Kyla Ward (living)
- Dave Warner (born 1953)
- Kaaron Warren (living)
- Judah Waten (1912–1985)
- Xavier Waterkeyn (born 1965)
- E. L. Grant Watson (1885–1970)
- Sam Watson (1952–2019)
- Margaret Way (1935–2022)
- Dvora Waysman (living)
- Janeen Webb (born 1951)
- Meredith Webber (living)
- Archie Weller (born 1957)
- Morris West (1916–1999)
- Frank Atha Westbury (1838–1901)
- Kim Westwood (living)
- Herb Wharton (born 1936)
- Nadia Wheatley (born 1949)
- Patrick White (1912–1990)
- Paul White (1910–1992)
- Sonny Whitelaw (born 1956)
- Robert Whyte (born 1955)
- Hugo Wilcken (living)
- Kim Wilkins (born 1966)
- Lili Wilkinson (born 1981)
- Darren Williams (born 1967)
- Ruth C. Williams (1897–1962)
- Sean Williams (born 1967)
- Anne Wilson (1848–1930)
- Josephine Wilson (living)
- Rohan Wilson (living)
- Ben Winch (born 1973)
- Tara June Winch (born 1983)
- Gerard Windsor (born 1944)
- Tim Winton (born 1960)
- Amy Witting (1918–2001)
- Chris Womersley (born 1968)
- Charlotte Wood (born 1965)
- Danielle Wood (born 1972)
- Joan Woodberry (1921–2010)
- Sue Woolfe (born 1950)
- Alexis Wright (born 1950)
- June Wright (1919–2012)
- Patricia Wrightson (1921–2010)
- Henry Wrixon (1839–1913)
- I. A. R. Wylie (1885–1959)

== Y ==
- Morgan Yasbincek (born 1964)
- Peter Yeldham (1927–2022)
- Helene Young (living)
- Ouyang Yu (born 1955), expatriate Chinese

== Z ==
- Arnold Zable (born 1947)
- Markus Zusak (born 1975)
- Matt Zurbo (born 1967)
- Rose Zwi (1928–2018)
- Fay Zwicky (1933–2017)

== See also ==
- Australian literature
- List of novelists by nationality
