= List of Harlequin Romance novels released in 2012 =

This is a list of Harlequin Romance novels released in 2012. (Main index: List of Harlequin Romance novels)

== Releases ==
Number	Title	Author	Date	Citations
#4285	Master Of The Outback	Margaret Way	January 2012	
#4286	The Reluctant Princess	Raye Morgan	January 2012	
#4287	The Ballerina Bride	Fiona Harper	January 2012	
#4288	Mardie And The City Surgeon	Marion Lennox	January 2012	
#4289	The Tycoon Who Healed Her Heart	Melissa James	January 2012	
#4290	Who Wants To Marry A Millionaire?	Nicola Marsh	January 2012	
#4291	A Bride For The Island Prince	Rebecca Winters	February 2012	
#4292	Miss Prim And The Billionaire	Lucy Gordon	February 2012	
#4293	The Cop, The Puppy And Me	Cara Colter	February 2012	
#4294	Their Miracle Twins	Nikki Logan	February 2012	
#4295	Daring To Date The Boss	Barbara Wallace	February 2012	
#4296	His Plain-Jane Cinderella	Jennie Adams	February 2012	
#4297	Once A Cowboy	Patricia Thayer	March 2012	
#4298	Pregnant With The Prince's Child	Raye Morgan	March 2012	
#4299	The Nanny And The Boss's Twins	Barbara McMahon	March 2012	
#4300	Inherited: Expectant Cinderella	Myrna Mackenzie	March 2012	
#4301	Back In The Soldier's Arms	Soraya Lane	March 2012	
#4302	The Inconvenient Laws Of Attraction	Trish Wylie	March 2012	
#4303	The Cattle King's Bride	Margaret Way	April 2012	
#4304	Falling For Mr. Mysterious	Barbara Hannay	April 2012	
#4305	The Nanny Who Kissed Her Boss	Barbara McMahon	April 2012	
#4306	We'll Always Have Paris	Jessica Hart	April 2012	
#4307	The Boy is Back in Town	Nina Harrington	April 2012	
#4308	The Pretend Proposal	Jackie Braun	April 2012	
#4309	Argentinian In The Outback	Margaret Way	May 2012	
#4310	Taming the Lost Prince	Raye Morgan	May 2012	
#4311	The Last Real Cowboy	Donna Alward	May 2012	
#4312	Valtieri's Bride	Caroline Anderson	May 2012	
#4313	It Started With A Crush...	Melissa McClone	May 2012	
#4314	The Man Who Saw Her Beauty	Michelle Douglas	May 2012	
#4315	The Tycoon's Secret Daughter	Susan Meier	June 2012	
#4316	The Sheriff's Doorstep Baby	Teresa Carpenter	June 2012	
#4317	The Rebel Rancher	Donna Alward	June 2012	
#4318	Plain Jane In The Spotlight	Lucy Gordon	June 2012	
#4319	Secrets And Speed Dating	Leah Ashton	June 2012	
#4320	The Sheikh's Jewel	Melissa James	June 2012	
#4321	The Rancher's Housekeeper	Rebecca Winters	July 2012	
#4322	The Cowboy Comes Home	Patricia Thayer	July 2012	
#4323	Battle For The Soldier's Heart	Cara Colter	July 2012	
#4324	The Last Woman He'd Ever Date	Liz Fielding	July 2012	
#4325	One Day To Find A Husband	Shirley Jump	July 2012	
#4326	Invitation To The Prince's Palace	Jennie Adams	July 2012	
#4327	Nanny For The Millionaire's Twins	Susan Meier	August 2012	
#4328	Slow Dance With The Sheriff	Nikki Logan	August 2012	
#4329	The Navy SEAL's Bride	Soraya Lane	August 2012	
#4330	Always The Best Man	Fiona Harper	August 2012	
#4331	How The Playboy Got Serious	Shirley Jump	August 2012	
#4332	New York's Finest Rebel	Trish Wylie	August 2012	
#4333	The Valtieri Baby	Caroline Anderson	September 2012	
#4334	Taming The Brooding Cattleman	Marion Lennox	September 2012	
#4335	Mr. Right, Next Door!	Barbara Wallace	September 2012	
#4336	My Greek Island Fling	Nina Harrington	September 2012	
#4337	Return of the Last McKenna	Shirley Jump	September 2012	
#4338	If The Ring Fits...	Jackie Braun	September 2012	
#4339	The English Lord's Secret Son	Margaret Way	October 2012	
#4340	The Rancher's Unexpected Family	Myrna Mackenzie	October 2012	
#4341	Snowbound In The Earl's Castle	Fiona Harper	October 2012	
#4342	Bella's Impossible Boss	Michelle Douglas	October 2012	
#4343	Wedding Date With Mr. Wrong	Nicola Marsh	October 2012	
#4344	A Girl Less Ordinary	Leah Ashton	October 2012	
#4345	The Count's Christmas Baby	Rebecca Winters	November 2012	
#4346	His Larkville Cinderella	Mellisa McClone	November 2012	
#4347	Sleigh Ride With The Rancher	Donna Alward	November 2012	
#4348	Monsoon Wedding Fever	Shoma Narayanan	November 2012	
#4349	The Cattleman's Special Delivery	Barbara Hannay	November 2012	
#4350	Snowed In At The Ranch	Cara Colter	November 2012	
#4351	Single Dad's Holiday Wedding	Patricia Thayer	December 2012	
#4352	The Secret That Changed Everything	Lucy Gordon	December 2012	
#4353	Mistletoe Kisses With The Billionaire	Shirley Jump	December 2012	
#4354	Her Outback Rescuer	Marion Lennox	December 2012	
#4355	Baby Under The Christmas Tree	Teresa Carpenter	December 2012	
#4356	The Nanny Who Saved Christmas	Michelle Douglas	December 2012	
