= List of Harlequin Romance novels released in 2009 =

This is a list of Harlequin Romance novels released in 2009. (Main index: List of Harlequin Romance novels)

== Releases ==
Number	Title	Author	Date	Citations
#4069	Luke: The Cowboy Heir	Patricia Thayer	January 2009	
#4070	Nanny To The Billionaire's Son	Barbara McMahon	January 2009	
#4071	The Snow-Kissed Bride	Linda Goodnight	January 2009	
#4072	Cinderella And The Sheikh	Natasha Oakley	January 2009	
#4073	Promoted: Secretary To Bride!	Jennie Adams	January 2009	
#4074	The Rancher's Runaway Princess	Donna Alward	January 2009	
#4075	The Australian's Society Bride	Margaret Way	February 2009	
#4076	Her Valentine Blind Date	Raye Morgan	February 2009	
#4077	The Royal Marriage Arrangement	Rebecca Winters	February 2009	
#4078	Two Little Miracles	Caroline Anderson	February 2009	
#4079	Manhattan Boss, Diamond Proposal	Trish Wylie	February 2009	
#4080	The Bridesmaid And The Billionaire	Shirley Jump	February 2009	
#4081	Brady: The Rebel Rancher	Patricia Thayer	March 2009	
#4082	Italian Groom, Princess Bride	Rebecca Winters	March 2009	
#4083	Falling For Her Convenient Husband	Jessica Steele	March 2009	
#4084	Cinderella's Wedding Wish	Jessica Hart	March 2009	
#4085	Her Cattleman Boss	Barbara Hannay	March 2009	
#4086	The Aristocrat And The Single Mom	Michelle Douglas	March 2009	
#4087	Diamond In The Rough	Diana Palmer	April 2009	
#4088	The Cowboy And The Princess	Myrna Mackenzie	April 2009	
#4089	Secret Baby, Surprise Parents	Liz Fielding	April 2009	
#4090	Nine-To-Five Bride	Jennie Adams	April 2009	
#4091	The Rebel King	Melissa James	April 2009	
#4092	Marrying The Manhattan Millionaire	Jackie Braun	April 2009	
#4093	Adopted: Family In A Million	Barbara McMahon	May 2009	
#4094	Hired: Nanny Bride	Cara Colter	May 2009	
#4095	Italian Tycoon, Secret Son	Lucy Gordon	May 2009	
#4096	Blind-Date Baby	Fiona Harper	May 2009	
#4097	The Billionaire's Baby	Nicola Marsh	May 2009	
#4098	Doorstep Daddy	Shirley Jump	May 2009	
#4099	Outback Heiress, Surprise Proposal	Margaret Way	June 2009	
#4100	Honeymoon With The Boss	Jessica Hart	June 2009	
#4101	His Princess In The Making	Melissa James	June 2009	
#4102	Dream Date With The Millionaire	Melissa McClone	June 2009	
#4103	Maid In Montana	Susan Meier	June 2009	
#4104	Hired: The Italian's Bride	Donna Alward	June 2009	
#4105	The Cowboy's Baby	Patricia Thayer	July 2009	
#4106	The Brooding Frenchman's Proposal	Rebecca Winters	July 2009	
#4107	The Sicilian's Bride	Carol Grace	July 2009	
#4108	His L.A. Cinderella	Trish Wylie	July 2009	
#4109	Dating The Rebel Tycoon	Ally Blake	July 2009	
#4110	Always The Bridesmaid	Nina Harrington	July 2009	
#4111	Cattle Baron: Nanny Needed	Margaret Way	August 2009	
#4112	Hired: Cinderella Chef	Myrna Mackenzie	August 2009	
#4113	Greek Boss, Dream Proposal	Barbara McMahon	August 2009	
#4114	Miss Maple And The Playboy	Cara Colter	August 2009	
#4115	Boardroom Baby Surprise	Jackie Braun	August 2009	
#4116	Bachelor Dad On Her Doorstep	Michelle Douglas	August 2009	
#4117	Keeping Her Baby's Secret	Raye Morgan	September 2009	
#4118	Claimed: Secret Royal Son	Marion Lennox	September 2009	
#4119	Expecting Miracle Twins	Barbara Hannay	September 2009	
#4120	Memo: The Billionaire's Proposal	Melissa McClone	September 2009	
#4121	A Trip With The Tycoon	Nicola Marsh	September 2009	
#4122	Invitation To The Boss's Ball	Fiona Harper	September 2009	
#4123	The Frenchman's Plain-Jane Project	Myrna Mackenzie	October 2009	
#4124	Betrothed: To The People's Prince	Marion Lennox	October 2009	
#4125	The Greek's Long-Lost Son	Rebecca Winters	October 2009	
#4126	The Bridesmaid's Baby	Barbara Hannay	October 2009	
#4127	A Princess For Christmas	Shirley Jump	October 2009	
#4128	His Housekeeper Bride	Melissa James	October 2009	
#4129	Montana, Mistletoe, Marriage: A Bride For Rocking H Ranch	Donna Alward	November 2009	
#4129	Montana, Mistletoe, Marriage: Snowbound Cowboy	Patricia Thayer	November 2009	
#4130	Crowned: The Palace Nanny	Marion Lennox	November 2009	
#4131	Christmas Angel For The Billionaire	Liz Fielding	November 2009	
#4132	The Magic of a Family Christmas	Susan Meier	November 2009	
#4133	Cowboy Daddy, Jingle-Bell Baby	Linda Goodnight	November 2009	
#4134	Under The Boss's Mistletoe	Jessica Hart	November 2009	
#4135	Australian Bachelors, Sassy Brides: Inherited By The Billionaire	Jennie Adams	December 2009	
#4135	Australian Bachelors, Sassy Brides: The Wealthy Australian's Proposal	Margaret Way	December 2009	
#4136	Her Desert Dream	Liz Fielding	December 2009	
#4137	Snowbound Bride-To-Be	Cara Colter	December 2009	
#4138	And The Bride Wore Red	Lucy Gordon	December 2009	
#4139	Their Christmas Family Miracle	Caroline Anderson	December 2009	
#4140	Confidential: Expecting!	Jackie Braun	December 2009	
