= Peter Rose (poet) =

Australian poet, memoirist, critic, novelist and editor

- Born: Peter John Rose; 8 June 1955 (age 71); Wangaratta, Victoria, Australia
- Writing career
- Language: English
- Years active: 1985–present

Peter John Rose (born 8 June 1955) is an Australian poet, memoirist, critic, novelist and editor. For many years he was an academic publisher. Since 2001 he has been editor of Australian Book Review.

== Career ==
Peter Rose was born in Wangaratta on 8 June 1955, and grew up there. Rose belongs to a famous Collingwood Football Club family. His father, Bob, was a celebrated Collingwood player and coach. His brother, Robert (1952–1999), also played for Collingwood and, as a cricketer, opened the batting for Victoria. Rose was educated at Haileybury, Melbourne and Monash University.

Throughout the 1990s Rose was a publisher at Oxford University Press, Australia, where he published a wide range of Oxford reference books and dictionaries. Since 2001 he has been the editor of the Australian Book Review. He has also edited two poetry anthologies.

In 2001, Rose published Rose Boys, a family memoir which won the National Biography Award in 2003. Rose Boys was reissued as a Text Classic in 2013.

In 2009 he appeared on the judging panel for the Prime Minister's Literary Awards, and in 2011 he judged the National Biography Award. He has for more than a decade been chairperson of the Robert Rose Foundation, which assists people with spinal cord injuries. An extensive selection of his poetry appears in the Australian Poetry Library.

Rose's poetry has won several awards. The collection Crimson Crop, published in 2012, won a Queensland Literary Award and has been shortlisted for the 2013 Prime Minister's Literary Award.

== Personal life ==
He has acknowledged his homosexuality, and his work has appeared in the anthology Out of the box : contemporary Australian gay and lesbian poets.

He lives in Melbourne.

== Bibliography ==
=== Poetry ===
Collections

- Rose, Peter (1990). The house of vitriol. Picador Poetry. Sydney: Pan.
- — (1993). The Catullan rag. Sydney: Picador.
- Donatello in Wangaratta, Hale & Iremonger, 1998 ISBN 0-86806-654-0
- Rattus Rattus: New and Selected Poems, Salt Publications, 2005 ISBN 978-1-84471-069-0
- Crimson Crop, UWA Publishing, 2012 ISBN 978-1-74258-390-7
- The Subject of Feeling, UWA Publishing, 2015 ISBN 978-1-74258-688-5

Selected list of poems

Title	Year	First published	Reprinted/collected/notes
Anniversary	2014	Rose, Peter (Autumn 2014). "Anniversary". Meanjin. 73 (1): 104–105.	Part of the ongoing series of poems The Catullan rag.

=== Memoir ===
- Rose Boys, Allen & Unwin, 2001 ISBN 978-1-86508-639-2
- Rose Boys, Text Classics, 2013 ISBN 978-1922147202

=== Fiction ===
- A Case of Knives, Allen & Unwin, 2005 ISBN 1-74114-536-8
- Roddy Parr, Fourth Estate, 2010, ISN 9780732290276

=== Anthology ===
- The Best Australian Poems 2007, Black Inc., 2007 ISBN 978-1-86395-417-4
- The Best Australian Poems 2008, Black Inc., 2008 ISBN 978-1-86395-303-0

=== Selected book and other reviews ===
Date	Review article	Work(s) reviewed
2011	Rose, Peter (September 2011). "In the ring with Susan Sontag" (PDF). Australian Book Review. 334: 20–21. Archived from the original (PDF) on 5 March 2016.	Nunez, Sigrid. Sempre Susan : a memoir of Susan Sontag. Atlas & Co.; Rieff, David. Swimming in a sea of death : a son's memoir. Melbourne University Press.
2014	Rose, Peter (September 2014). "Don Giovanni". Australian Book Review. 364: 38.	Opera Australia's Don Giovanni, directed by David McVicar at the Sydney Opera House, 7 August 2014.
2022	Rose, Peter (October 2022). "Unconditional refusal : a stark and uncompromising memoir". Australian Book Review. 447: 31–32.	Burns, Shannon (2022). Childhood. Melbourne: Text Publishing.
