= Hilary Lofting =

Novelist, travel writer, journalist and editor

Hilary Joseph Francis Lofting
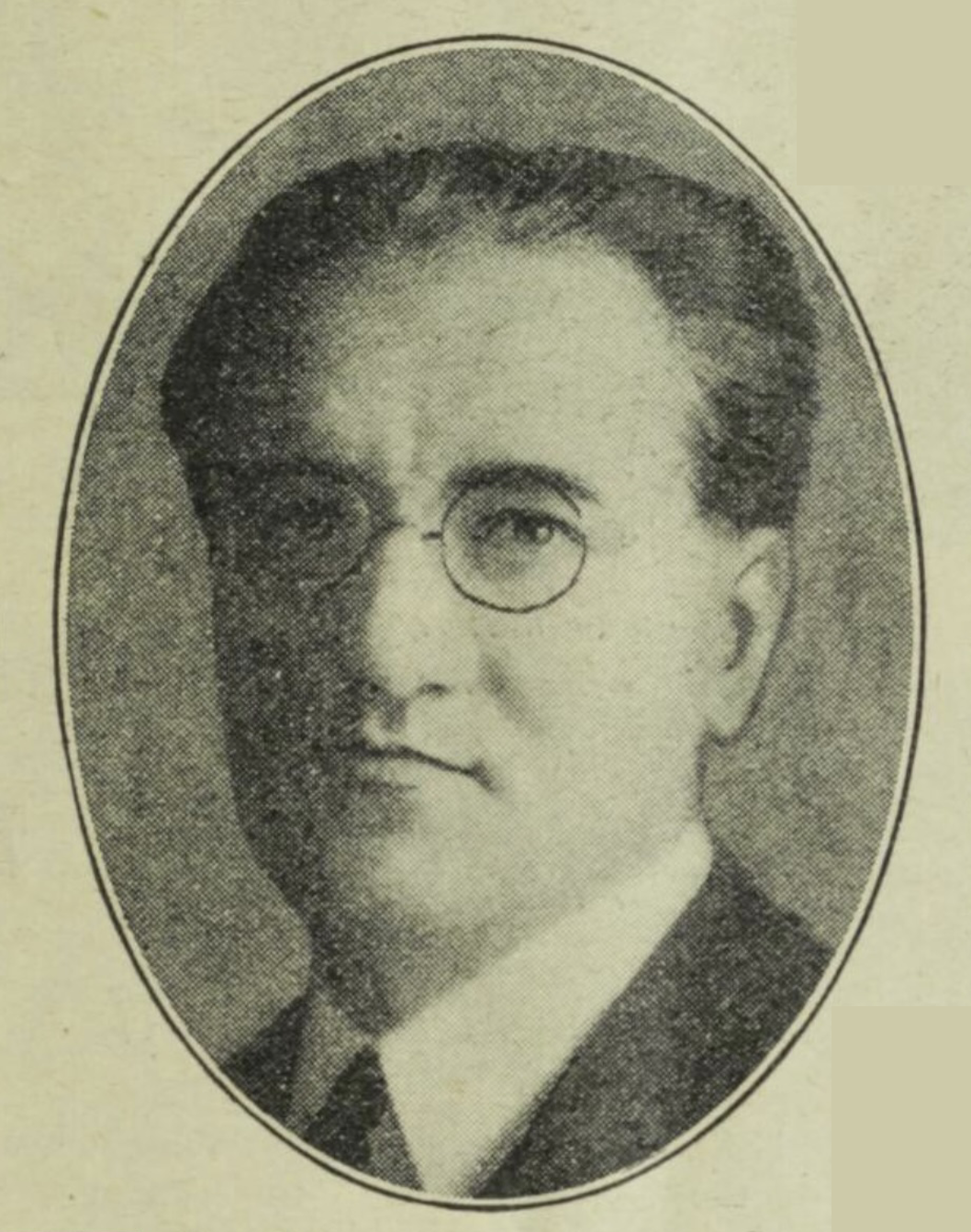
- Born: 23 May 1881; London, England
- Died: 3 May 1939 (aged 57); Manly, New South Wales, Australia
- Education: St Edmund's College, Cambridge
- Occupations: Novelist, travel writer, journalist, editor
- Spouse(s): May Wheatcroft (1915–1917); Margaret Fane (1918–1939; his death)
- Relatives: John Brien Lofting (father), Elizabeth Agnes Gannon (mother), Mary Lofting (sister), Basil Lofting (brother), Eric Lofting (brother), Hugh Lofting (brother)
- Writing career
- Pen name: Francis Brien
- Language: English
- Genres: Short story, Travel writing
- Notable works: The Happy Vagabond (1928, Co-author of Margaret Fane); Bail Up! (1939)

Hilary Joseph Francis Lofting (23 May 1881 – 3 May 1939) was an Australian novelist, travel writer, journalist and editor.

He was the eldest brother of Hugh Lofting (1886–1947), author of Doctor Dolittle.

== Early life and education ==
Hilary Lofting was born in London, England, to John Brien Lofting and Elizabeth Agnes Gannon. He was of English and Irish descent. Lofting was the eldest of five boys and one girl.

Lofting studied Architectural Engineering at St Edmund's College, Cambridge. After graduating, he was involved in railway construction around Ireland, continental Europe and Argentina as a civil engineer. He returned to England after finishing the work, and volunteered for military service, but was twice rejected.

== Marriage ==
In 1915, Lofting married May Wheatcroft in London. The couple moved to Australia in 1917. He was encouraged by friends to write about his experiences in Buenos Aires, under the pseudonym of "Francis Brien". His travel writing was well received and caught the eye of David McKee Wright who was editor of The Bulletin, and published Lofting's writing. Lofting decided to be a full-time writer and quit civil engineering, but May was opposed to his career change.

The following year, Lofting was remarried to Margaret Fane, who was Wright's ex-wife. Lofting and Fane collaborated on short stories published in The Sydney Mail, The Sydney Morning Herald and other magazines. Lofting was friends with Christopher Brennan, who spent more than a year in Lofting's house until 1926.

== Death ==
In 1939, Lofting died in the Sydney suburb of Manly. He was listed alongside Edward J. O'Brien, Henry Handel Richardson and Alan Marshall as one of the excellent short story writers in Australia.

== Works ==
- The Happy Vagabond (1928, co-author with Margaret Fane)
- Bail Up!: Ned Kelly, Bushranger (1939)

=== Introduction ===
- For the Term of his Natural Life (by Marcus Clarke, 1929 edition)

== See also ==
- List of Australian novelists
