= Graeme Friedman =

Graeme Friedman is a clinical psychologist and an award-winning writer whose short stories have appeared in anthologies published internationally. His book The Fossil Artist (Jacana, 2010), a novel about crime, authenticity, what it means to be human and how we come to love, was shortlisted for the Commonwealth Writers' Prize (Best First Book).

He is also the author of the critically acclaimed The Piano War (David Philip, 2003), an unbelievable yet true story of love and survival set against the horrors of World War II, and of Madiba’s Boys, a non-fiction book on South African football, politics and history, published in South Africa (New Africa Books, 2001) and the United Kingdom (Comerford & Miller, 2001) with a foreword by Nelson Mandela. Madiba’s Boys was a Top Ten Sports Book in the United Kingdom.

Friedman has co-edited a collection of prose and poetry entitled A Writer in Stone (David Philip, 1998), and has written on the topics of torture and the political trial, based on his experience as a trauma counsellor and an expert witness for the defence - mostly ANC liberation fighters - during political trials of the apartheid era.

He has appeared at writers’ festivals and workshops in South Africa and, more recently, in Sydney, Australia, where he now lives with his wife and their three children.

== Bibliography ==
Books

1. It Doesn't Have To Be So Hard: the Secrets to Finding and Keeping Intimacy, forthcoming Random House, 2012. Co-written with Joanne Fedler (Secret Mothers' Business).

Short Stories

1. "A Spy in the House of Art", published in Danish translation in Opbrud, edited by Chris van Wyk (AKS/Hjulet, 2000) and in English in Post-Traumatic, edited by Chris van Wyk (Botsotso Publishing, 2003).
2. "Marilyn’s Dress", awarded first prize in the herStoriA writing competition, published in Running Towards Us: New Writing from South Africa, edited by Isabel Balseiro (Heinemann, 2000).
3. "Patrick’s Deli", published in Electronic Sesame III (Barefoot Press, 1998).
4. "The Beggar in the Bookshop", published in A Writer in Stone, edited by Graeme Friedman & Roy Blumenthal (David Philip, 1998).
5. "The Demobbing", published in Jewish Writing in the Contemporary World: South Africa, edited by Claudia Braude (Nebraska University Press, 2001).
6. "The Finger of God", published in At the Rendezvous of Victory and Other Stories, edited by Andries Oliphant (Kwela Books, 1999).
