= Margaret Fane =

Australian poet, novelist

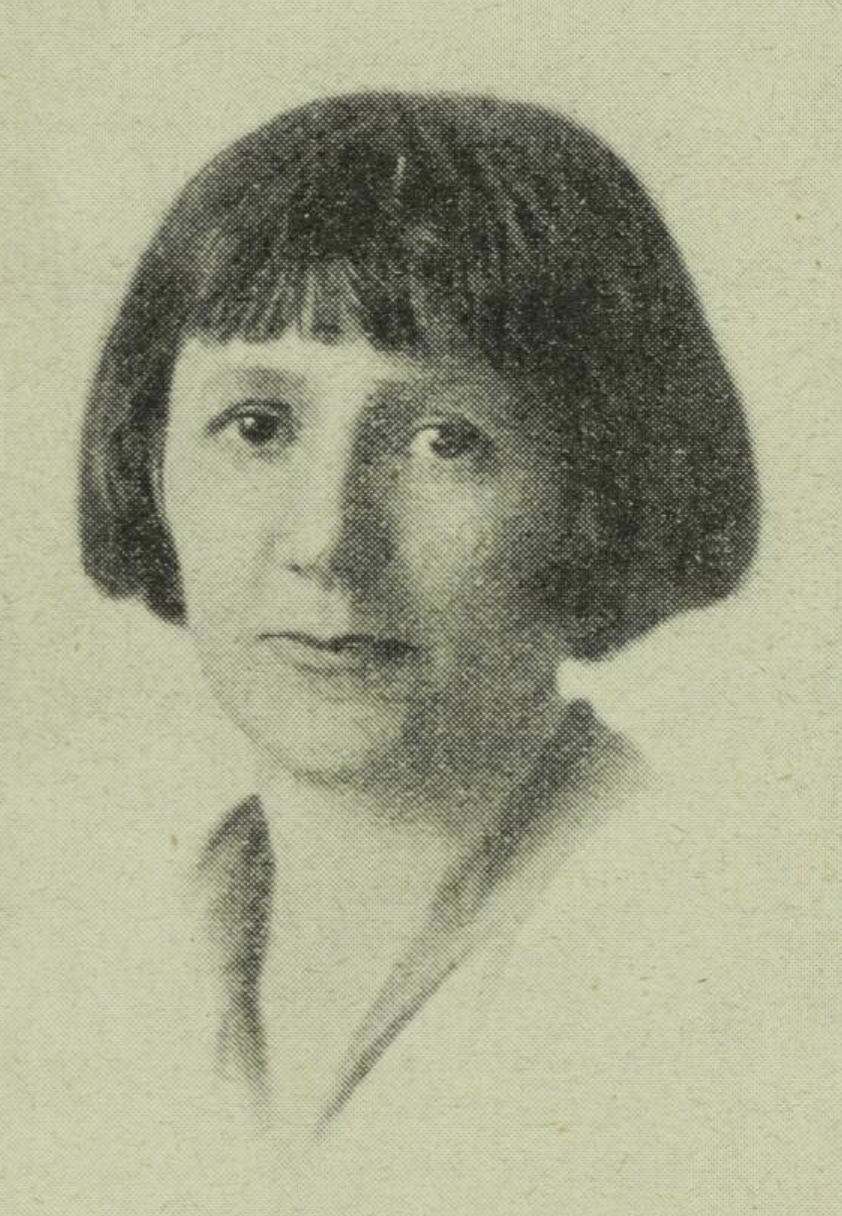
- Born: Beatrice Florence Osborn; 10 January 1887; Camberwell, Victoria, Australia
- Died: 1962 (aged 74–75); Brisbane, Queensland, Australia
- Occupations: Novelist, poet
- Spouse(s): David McKee Wright (1912–1918); Hilary Lofting (1918–1939; his death)
- Writing career
- Genres: Short story, poetry
- Notable work: The Happy Vagabond (1928, co-author)

Margaret Fane (born Beatrice Florence Osborn, 10 January 1887 – 1962) was an Australian novelist and poet. Her short stories were published in the Sydney Mail, the Sydney Morning Herald, The Bulletin and the Australian Woman's Mirror. She co-wrote The Happy Vagabond with Hilary Lofting (1928).

== Early life ==
She was born in Camberwell, a suburb of Melbourne, to English and Spanish Australian parents. Her father was born in British Ceylon, and arrived in Australia as a child. As a girl, Fane had aspired to be an opera singer like her mother. However, under the influence of her father, who liked literature, she became well versed in the works of Charles Dickens and William Shakespeare, eventually becoming a writer herself.

== Personal life ==
In 1912, Fane married David McKee Wright (1869–1928), editor of The Bulletin. She gave birth to their four sons. She divorced Wright in 1918. Fane remarried, marrying Hilary Lofting (1881–1939, the eldest brother of Hugh Lofting). Her second marriage stimulated Fane's creative impulses. She and Hilary published short stories in various publications, including The Sydney Mail, The Sydney Morning Herald and other magazines.

She died in 1962, in Brisbane, Australia.

== Work ==
- The Happy Vagabond (1928, co-authored with Hilary Lofting)

== See also ==
- List of Australian novelists
