= Lionel Shave =

Australian dramatist

Lionel Shave (1888-1954) was an Australian dramatist born in Victoria and died in Sydney. He married Doris Minnie Long (1891-1968), and was the father of the businessman and patron of the arts Kenneth Shave. His plays were produced by the Australian Broadcasting Commission.

== Works ==
- 1942 Twelve Moons Cold
- 1948 The Resignation of Mr. Bagsworth
- 1948 Red and Gold
- 1944 That's Murder: a mystery comedy in one act
- 1938 A Sirius Cove, radio play
- 1935 The White Bud
- 1920 Pattern for a Fresco : a comedy in two acts
- 1919 The Lost Magic (poetry)
- 1919 The Poet, the Muse and the Missus
- 1916 "One for Sorrer" (short story humour)
- 1948 Wheatlands (as song lyricist with music by Iris Mason)
