= Kathleen Mannington Caffyn =

Irish-Australian novelist (c.1853 – 1926)

- Born: Kathleen Mannington Hunt c. 1853; Thurles, County Tipperary, Ireland
- Died: 6 February 1926 (aged 73); Turin, Italy
- Occupations: Nurse and writer
- Spouse: Stephen Mannington Caffyn (m. 1879; died 1896)

Kathleen Mannington Caffyn (née Hunt; c. 1853 – 6 February 1926) was a nurse and writer. Born in Ireland around 1853, she moved to London in her twenties and trained as a nurse. She married a surgeon in 1879 and moved to Australia the following year. There, she advocated for the professionalisation of nursing and began to contribute fiction to local magazines and newspapers.

After returning to London in 1892, she published her first and best-known novel, A Yellow Aster, under the pen name "Iota". She became known as a New Woman writer and published an additional sixteen novels, in which she explored themes of marriage, femininity, and sexuality. After publishing her final novel in 1916, she died in Turin, Italy, in 1926.

== Biography ==
=== Early life ===
Kathleen Mannington Caffyn was born Kathleen Mannington Hunt (Note: According to her marriage certificate, Caffyn's legal name may have been Katharine.) into a family of land-owning Irish Protestants at Waterloo House in Thurles, County Tipperary, in around 1853. She was the daughter of William de Vere Hunt and his wife Louisa (née Going). Kathleen did not receive a formal schooling and was instead educated at home by governesses.

Around 1877 she moved to London, joining many other middle-class Irish women who moved to England to pursue an education and build a career, and trained as a nurse at St Thomas' Hospital. After completing her training, she began working as a nurse for the London Metropolitan and National Nursing Association. She married the surgeon Stephen Mannington Caffyn in 1879; the following year she and her husband moved to Australia.

=== Life in Australia ===
Upon arriving in Australia Kathleen and her husband lived in Sydney, before moving to the Melbourne suburb of Brighton in 1883. She became a founding member of the Melbourne District Nursing Society and advocated for the development of the nursing profession in the colony and the establishment of adequate training schools for nurses. She argued that nursing was a profession that was best suited to educated, upper-class women, criticising the view that nursing was simply a type of domestic service. She gave evidence at a royal commission into nursing in Victoria, where she argued that there was a need to improve standards and regulation to ensure that Australian nurses were properly educated and of good character.

After moving to Victoria, Kathleen began to contribute writing to local newspapers and magazines. She wrote fiction for the journals Cooee: Tales of Australian Life by Australian Ladies and By Creek and Gully. Her husband was also involved in literary circles, becoming a contributor to The Bulletin and publishing a successful novel titled Miss Milne and I in 1889. During her time in Australia Kathleen was a member of several charitable committees aimed at poverty relief.

=== Writing career and later life ===
Kathleen and her husband returned to London in 1892. Around this time her husband filed for bankruptcy; Kathleen began writing fiction under the pen name "Iota" soon after, potentially to ease the family's financial strain. In 1894 she published her first and best-known novel, A Yellow Aster. The novel is associated with the New Woman and Decadent movements. It depicts a woman named Gwen who was raised in a rationalist, free-thinking household and becomes trapped in an unhappy marriage, before eventually finding fulfilment through pregnancy and motherhood. The novel, which was published anonymously, was initially rumoured to have been written by the feminist Olive Schreiner before Caffyn was revealed as its author. A Yellow Aster was a major commercial success and caused Caffyn to become a well-known novelist.

Kathleen's husband died from tuberculosis on 2 October 1896. She continued writing, publishing a total of seventeen novels over the course of her career. She also continued to pursue her passions for hunting and horse riding in her later life. In 1916 she published her final novel, Mary Mirrilies. Caffyn died following a surgery on 6 February 1926 at a nursing home in Turin, Italy. She and her husband had at least one son. (Note: The Oxford Dictionary of National Biography and The Dictionary of Irish Biography report that the Caffyns had one son. In the 2016 book Irish Women's Writing, 1878–1922, Ciaran O'Neill and Mai Yatani list three sons: Harold (b. 1891), Jack (b. 1892), and Chaloner McRae (b. 1894).)

== Writing ==
Caffyn wrote a total of seventeen novels, of which the first—A Yellow Aster—was her most successful. Caffyn's writing often explored the sexual relationships between husbands and wives, infidelity, and women's status within marriage. In a theme common to New Woman fiction, her first novel A Yellow Aster likens marriage to a form of slavery or prostitution. Some scholars have described Caffyn's writing as featuring the subversion or reversal of gender roles, while others have argued that her writing largely accepts the conventional norms of her era regarding the power relations between men and women. The scholar of Victorian literature Naomi Hetherington writes that Caffyn's acceptance of patriarchal norms has led her work to be comparatively neglected in studies of New Woman fiction.

Caffyn has been described as an ambivalent or anti-feminist writer. In The Oxford Dictionary of National Biography, Caffyn is described as a "reluctant, contrary, and, at best, conservative feminist". While she became associated with the "New Woman" movement following the publication of her first novel, she distanced herself from its association with the women's rights movement and was an opponent of women's suffrage.

== Selected works ==
- A Yellow Aster (1894)
- Children of Circumstances (1894)
- A Comedy of Spasms (1895)
- A Quaker Grandmother (1896)
- Poor Max (1898)
- Ann Mauleverer (1899)
- The Minx (1900)
- The Happiness of Jill (1901)
- He for God Only (1903)
- Patricia: A Mother (1905)
- Smoke in the Flame (1907)
- The Magic of May (1908)
- Who Breaketh an Hedge (1909)
- Dorinda and her Daughter (1910)
- Mary Mirrilies (1916)
