= Deborah Burrows =

Australian novelist and lawyer

- Born: Perth, Western Australia
- Occupations: Novelist, Lawyer
- Writing career
- Genre: Literature

Deborah Burrows is an Australian novelist and lawyer.

== Life ==
Deborah Burrows (née Williams) was born in Perth, Western Australia in 1959. She grew up in the riverside suburb of Applecross. She currently works as a lawyer specialising in the area of medical law. She holds several degrees in history – modern and medieval, including a post-graduate degree in Medical History from the University of Oxford.

== Literary career ==
Burrows' first novel, A Stranger in My Street was published in June 2012. It was a Davitt Award 2013 finalist. Her second novel, Taking a Chance, was published in May 2013. Her third novel, A Time of Secrets, was published in March 2015. All three novels are published by Pan Macmillan Australia. In 2017 she published Ambulance Girls, the first of a trilogy set in the London Blitz: Ambulance Girls, Ambulance Girls Under Fire (2018) and Ambulance Girls at War (2019), published by Penguin Random House. In 2018 the National Library of Australia published Nurses of Australia: The Illustrated Story. She has also given numerous public lectures and talks on historical and literary subjects.

== Legal career ==
Burrows is a Senior Assistant State Solicitor at the State Solicitor's Office (SSO) of Western Australia. She was admitted to practice in 1982, having completed her articles of clerkship at Stone James & Co (now King & Wood Mallesons). She joined the SSO in 1987, after working in private practice and with the Australian Government Solicitor.

Burrows specialises in medical law. In that capacity she assists in the defence of medical treatment liability claims made against public hospitals and their employees. She also defends asbestos related disease claims made against government departments and instrumentalities, assists with preparation for coronial inquests relating to public hospitals and provides advice to government departments and instrumentalities on various health-related issues.

== Academic ==
Burrows holds a Bachelor of Laws from the University of Western Australia, a Bachelor of Arts with First Class Honours in History and a Master of Philosophy in Medieval and Renaissance Studies. In 2000/01 she took leave from the SSO for a year to complete a Master of Science (Economic and Social History) at Oxford University.
