= Cate Kendall =

Australian writer

Cate Kendall is the pen name of Australian co-authors Michelle Hamer and Lisa Blundell. Writing under this name, Hamer and Blundell have produced two novels which have reached the Australian best-seller lists.

== Books ==
"Kendall's" first novel, published in Australia by Random House's Bantam Books imprint in 2007, was Gucci Mamas, an Australian bestseller that went on to be published in Romania and France.

Kendall's second novel is Versace Sisters, published in 2009, also by Bantam Books.

"Chanel Sweethearts" shortly followed as the third novel, carrying on the title convention.

"Armani Angels" was to be the fourth written by Cate Kendall; realised in 2015.
