= Luke Romyn =

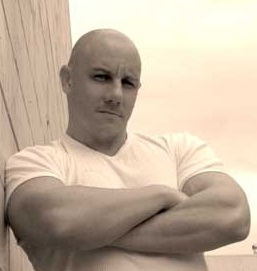

Luke Romyn (born 1975) is an Amazon and USA Today bestselling Australian author of action thriller novels published in America and author of the highly acclaimed best-selling novel The Dark Path, Blacklisted, The Prometheus Wars series, The Legacy Chronicles saga, Ryder series, Walking with Shadows, Trinity, Immortal Billy, The Shade Trilogy, The Last Hunter series, and After the Fall. He has since gone on to become a top 100 bestseller on Amazon, a #1 bestselling author in action and adventure on Amazon, and a USA Today bestselling author.

== Biography ==
Luke Romyn is a USA Today and Amazon #1 bestselling author whose books have sold over 600,000 copies worldwide. With a background in international security, Romyn's books are high-octane fantasy novels that stretch the limits of human imagination. From apocalyptic thrillers to psychic suspense to mythical adventures. Romyn also works in marketing and spends time as a mentor for troubled youths in North Queensland, Australia, where he lives with his wife, Sarah, and various animals he calls family.

Born in Sydney, Romyn's love of writing was evident from an early age. His first foray into writing was at the age of twelve with a short story titled, "Vesuvius, 79 AD!" and saw him recognized at a state level.

After the death of his father in Fiji, Romyn's teen years were fraught with cases of him being in trouble with the law, starkly contrasted by him excelling in school work, which he professed often bored him. After finishing high school, Romyn landed a job as a nightclub bouncer which turned into a career as a contract security operator, taking him to various countries in roles as diverse as security for Disney stage shows to close protection for television and film stars, both Australian and international.

Romyn is represented by Italia Gandolfo from Gandolfo, Helin, and Fountain Literary Management.
