= June Duncan Owen =

Australian author

June Duncan Owen is an Australian author. Her non-fiction book, Mixed Matches : Interracial Marriages in Australia, published in 2002 by UNSW Press, is the first full-length study of Australian mixed marriages and identifies a significant demographic trend. By 2030 it is estimated that 75% of Australian families will have an interracial marriage in their own family or in their extended family. The book shows the impact of interracial marriage in Australian society, how society has changed, with the majority of Australians accepting mixed marriages when once they were not only rare but provoked hostility and even hate.

Owen, of Anglo-Scot background, has been married for over 45 years to a Malaysian man of Sinhalese and Indian parentage. At the time they were married such marriages in Australia "were considered unusual and even shameful".

Addressing The Sydney Institute on Tuesday 27 August 2002, Owen reflected on tolerance and intolerance around Australian interracial marriages and towards the end of her speech noted that "many" of the mixed marriage interviewees in her 2002 book "expressed dismay at what they see as the fractionalisation of Australia". Owen stated that "increasing diversity must be factored in for any proposed plan for Australia’s future”.

Owen graduated from the University of Sydney with an MA in history and also has a diploma in social science from the University of Adelaide. She has worked as a social worker in Adelaide and Singapore; as a teacher in South Australia and Victoria and has farmed in Tasmania.

Owen has been writing professionally for more than 20 years and has had five books published.

The cover illustration for Owen's Mixed Matches: Interracial Marriage in Australia is "Generations" by Barbara Hanrahan 1991.

== Publications ==
Owen, June (1987). The Heart of the City: The first 125 Years of the Sydney City Mission, Kangaroo Press: Kenthurst, NSW, ISBN 086417151X

June Duncan Owen (1992). How to Write and Sell Articles, Penguin: Ringwood, Victoria, ISBN 0140146253

June Duncan Owen (2002). Mixed Matches: Interracial Marriage in Australia, UNSW Press: Sydney, ISBN 0868405817

June Duncan Owen (2004). The Missing Wife, Indra Publishing: Briar Hill, Vic, ISBN 192078702X

June Duncan Owen (2005). Worm in the Bud, Indra Publishing: Briar Hill, Vic, ISBN 1920787127

== Awards ==
- 2005 Winner Biennial Book Awards - Fiction: The Missing Wife 2004 novel.
- 2007 Winner Biennial Book Awards - Fiction: Worm in the Bud 2005 novel.
