= Lee Tulloch =

Australian-born journalist and author (born 1954)

- Born: Melbourne, Australia
- Occupations: Journalist, novelist
- Spouse: Tony Amos (photographer)
- Children: Lolita

Lee Ann Tulloch (born 12 January 1954) is an Australian-born journalist and author.

== Profile ==
She was born in Melbourne, and has a degree in English literature from Melbourne University. She has worked as a researcher in federal politics. She was arts features editor for Vogue Australia from 1978 to 1982, and editor-in-chief of Harper's Bazaar Australia. After moving to New York in 1985, she wrote her first novel, Fabulous Nobodies, which was published in 1989. With her photographer husband, Anthony Amos, she chose a bohemian life, moving between Australia, New York and Paris for more than a decade with their young daughter, Lolita. In Paris, she began her second novel, Wraith, a gothic tale of a dead supermodel who comes back to haunt her personal assistant. She completed it in New York and it was published in 1999. In 2001 she published her third novel, Two Shanes, a comedy of errors about an Australian surfer in Manhattan. On 11 September 2001 she was evacuated from her Tribeca home and left her beloved Manhattan for the relative peace of a Sydney beach. Her fourth novel, The Cutting, a murder mystery set on the Australian coast, was published in 2003. A collection of her fashion essays, Perfect Pink Polish, was published in 2005. Her latest work is a darkly erotic novel, The Woman in the Lobby (May 2008.)

== Bibliography ==
- Fabulous Nobodies (Chatto & Windus, 1989)
- Wraith (Penguin, 1999)
- Two Shanes (Text Publishing, 2001)
- The Cutting: A Nullin Mystery (Penguin, 2004)
- Perfect Pink Polish (Penguin, 2005)
- The Woman in the Lobby (Penguin, 2008)
- In Vogue: 50 years of Australian Style (Harper Collins, 2009) with Kirstie Clements
