= Susan Geason =

Australian crime writer

Susan Dorothy Geason (born 1946) is an Australian writer of fiction and non-fiction for adults and teenagers.

== Biography ==
Born in New Norfolk, Tasmania, to Urban James and Joan Susan (née Oakford) Geason, she grew up in Queensland and graduated from the University of Queensland with a BA in History and Politics.

Geason emigrated to Canada in 1970. After working as a librarian at the Toronto Institute of Technology, she was hired as administrative assistant for the Association of Part-time Students (APUS) at the University. At APUS she organised the first Ontario Conference on Women in Education and the first conference of executives of part-time student organisations in Canada. She also advocated for part-time students and represented APUS on university committees.

She also completed a Masters Qualifying and received two university scholarships to complete a Masters in Political Philosophy and begin a PhD. University of Toronto.

During 1974-76, Geason was a Junior Fellow at Massey College in the University of Toronto, during which she completed course work for Comparative Public Administration as a second teaching option, a requirement for a PhD, and worked as a teaching assistant for undergraduate political philosophy students. She also carried out two three-month research projects for the Ontario Government's Women's Bureau.

On returning to Australia in 1976, she was a research assistant for the Teachers Registration Board in Brisbane before being chosen for the Commonwealth Government's Assistant Research Officer Program. After a reluctant stint in the Defence Department, she became a legislative researcher in the Parliamentary Library, Canberra, in 1978-80.

From 1980 to 1981 was education editor of The National Times.

From March 1982 to 1985 Geason was a policy officer in the Cabinet Office of the NSW Premier's Department.

From 1985 to 1987, she was head of Information and Publications with the NSW State Pollution Control Commission.

From 1991 to 1997, Geason was literary editor of The Sydney Morning Herald.

Since 1987, she has worked as a freelance writer, editor and communications consultant, writing and editing reports and speeches for government and business clients.

The State Library of New South Wales holds the Susan Geason papers, 1989-2001, relating to the books she was writing at that time and comprising correspondence, draft manuscripts, interview notes, book plans, news clippings, research and photographs.

Geason was awarded a PhD in creative writing by the School of English, Media Studies and Art History at the University of Queensland in 2005 for her thesis, "Under the Canopy of Heaven : Charlotte Brontë and Mary Taylor; What Mary Knew : The Relationship Between Mary Taylor and Charlotte Brontë". It was published as What Mary Knew : Mary Taylor and Charlotte Brontë in 2011.

== Publications ==
=== Adult fiction ===
- Shaved Fish, Allen & Unwin, 1990, ISBN 0044422741
- Wildfire, Arrow Books/Random House, 1995, ISBN 0091832160

=== Crime fiction ===
- Dogfish: A Syd Fish thriller, Allen & Unwin, 1991, ISBN 1863730885
- Sharkbait: A Syd Fish mystery, Allen & Unwin, 1993, ISBN 1863736328

=== Teenage fiction and non-fiction ===
- Great Australian Girls and the Remarkable Women They Became, ABC Books, 1999, ISBN 9780733307584
- Australian Heroines: Stories of Courage and Survival, ABC Books, 2001, ISBN 0733309666
- Death of a Princess, Little Hare Books, 2005, ISBN 9781877003905; Ashton Scholastic, NY, 2006. ISBN 9780439900713
- Rebel Girl: A Tale of Friendship and Survival in Taiping China, ABC Books, 2007, ISBN 9780733321733
- All Fall Down, Little Hare Books, 2005, ISBN 1877003867; Large print edition ReadHowYouWant, 2008
- Flight of the Falcon, Little Hare Books, 2006, ISBN 1921049367; Large print edition ReadHowYouWant, 2009

=== Non-Fiction ===
- Regarding Jane Eyre, (editor and contributor), Random House, 1997, ISBN 0091835038
- Pitt Water People : The Ivers, Young, Gould, Cashman and Lahey Families in Tasmania, Susan Geason, 2010, ISBN 9780980787900
- What Mary Knew : Mary Taylor & Charlotte Brontë, Susan Geason, 2011, ISBN 9780980787955
- People of the Plains: The Young, Gould, Cashman, Lahey, Geason and Beven Families in Tasmania, Susan Geason, 2nd ed., 2011, ISBN 9780980787931
- River Folk: The Latham, Griggs, Corbett, Oakford, Darcy and O'Connor Families in Tasmania, Susan Geason, 2nd ed., 2011, ISBN 9780980787924
- A Long Way from Tipperary: The Geason, Beven, Evans and Lynch Families in Tasmania, Susan Geason, 2nd ed., 2011, ISBN 9780987235701

=== Stories in anthologies and magazines ===
- An Old Husband's Tale in More Crimes for a Summer Christmas, ed. Stephen Knight, Allen & Unwin, 1991, ISBN 9781863731065
- Aint Misbehavin' in Killing Women: Rewriting Detective Fiction (essays on feminism and the PI genre), ed. Delys Bird, Angus & Robertson, 1993, ISBN 0207179484
- Conflict of Interest in Moonlight Becomes You: Crimes for Summer 6, ed. Jean Bedford, Allen & Unwin, 1995, ISBN 1863739963
- Sybilla of the Fires in Overland Vol. 138, Autumn 1995
- Totally Devoted in Shadow Alley (crime for teenagers), compiled by Lucy Sussex, Omnibus Books, 1995, ISBN 1862912408
- Green Murder in Women on the Case, ed. Sara Paretsky, Delacorte, 1996, ISBN 0385314019; & Virago, 1996, ISBN 1860491049
- Geason has had stories published in Australian Penthouse, Billy Blue Magazine, The Sun-Herald, Tages Anzeiger (Zurich), Australasian Post

=== Radio plays ===
- Fish Tales, radio adaptation of Shaved Fish, ABC Audio Crime Fiction Series, ISBN 0642178658

=== Crime prevention ===
- Crime Prevention: Theory and Practice, (Paul R. Wilson, co-author), Australian Institute of Criminology, 1988, ISBN 0642135576
- Designing Out Crime: Crime Prevention Through Environmental Design, (Paul R. Wilson, co-author), Australian Institute of Criminology, 1989, ISBN 0642143072
- Preventing Car Theft and Crime in Car Parks, (Paul R. Wilson, co-author), Australian Institute of Criminology, 1990, ISBN 0642149399
- Preventing Graffiti and Vandalism, (Paul R. Wilson, co-author), Australian Institute of Criminology, 1990, ISBN 0642149364
- Preventing Retail Crime, (Paul R. Wilson, co-author), Australian Institute of Criminology, 1992, ISBN 0642170479

=== Translations ===
- Fish im Truben, (Shaved Fish) Haffman's Verlag, Munich, 1994. ISBN 3251300431
- Fish for die Hunde, (Dogfish) Wilhelm Heyne Verlag, Munich, 1997. ISBN 3453126149
- Buschfeuer, (Wildfire) Wilhelm Heyne Verlag, Munich, 1998.ISBN 345313687X
- Haifuschfutter, (Sharkbait) Haffman's Verlag, Zurich, 1999. ISBN 3251301152
- Dogfish: Eaux troubles a Sydney", L'Aube Noire, editions de l'Aube, La Tour d'Aigues, 1996. ISBN 2020371278
- La morsure du requin (Sharkbait, L'Aube Noire, 1993. ISBN 2876783592
- La Ville en Flammes, (Wildfire) Editions de l'Aube, La Tour d'Aigues, 2001. ISBN 2876786397
- Parfum d'Isis, (Death of a Princess) Rageot, Paris, 2008. ISBN 9782700233698
- Haremske spletke, (Death of a Princess) Aurora, Ljubljana, Slovenia, 2010. ISBN 9789616788342
- Sokolov Let, (Flight of the Falcon) Aurora, Ljubljana, Slovenia, 2009. ISBN 9789619257197
