= Jessica Dettmann =

Australian author and performer

- Education: University of Sydney; Lincoln College, Oxford
- Writing career
- Language: English
- Notable work: How to Be Second Best

Jessica Dettmann is an Australian author and performer.

== Career ==
Dettmann worked as an editor for Random House Australia and HarperCollins Publishers Australia before becoming a writer.

In late 2018 her debut novel How to Be Second Best was published through HarperCollins, drawing comparisons to Liane Moriarty and Marian Keyes. The novel was endorsed by both Mia Freedman and Ben Elton, who labelled Dettmann "a fine comic writer". The Daily Telegraph called it "the first book you have to read in the new year".

In 2019 the Telegraph tipped her as "Australia’s next Liane Moriarty".

Dettmann has regularly performed her work at Giant Dwarf's Story Club. In July 2016 she performed 'The Chairs Are Gone'. In October 2018 she performed 'Yuletide MacGyver'.

== Bibliography ==
Novels

- How to Be Second Best (HarperCollins, 2018)
- This Has Been Absolutely Lovely (HarperCollins, 2021)

Short stories

- 'In Recognition of Fifteen Years’ Service' in Thanks for The Mammaries (Penguin, 2009)

Performance pieces

- '64: The Chairs Are Gone' (Giant Dwarf Story Club, 2016)
- '139: Yuletide MacGyver' (Giant Dwarf Story Club, 2018)

Other

- 'Books that Changed Me' (The Sydney Morning Herald, 2019)

== Reviews ==
- ABC Radio Melbourne - What’s on at the library? Just ask Monica Dullard
- "The first book you have to read in the new year". The Daily Telegraph. Archived from the original on 14 January 2019.
- "How To Be Second Best review: Jessica Dettmann has fun with the rom-com novel". The Sydney Morning Herald. 11 February 2019.
