= Chris Broadribb =

Australian writer

- Born: Perth, Western Australia
- Education: Master of Arts (Professional Writing), Graduate Diploma (Journalism)
- Alma mater: University of Technology, Sydney
- Writing career
- Pen name: Chris Broadribb, C. A. Broadribb
- Language: English
- Period: 1974 -
- Genres: Crime, children's
- Notable work: Nice Day for a Murder
- Notable awards: Multiple, see below
- Website: Wild Thoughts

Chris Broadribb is an Australian writer who has written three novels and over 60 short pieces of fiction over the last forty years. Born and raised in Perth, Western Australia, she has been writing since the age of six. Translating her passion for literature into her adult life, she obtained a Master of Arts (Professional Writing) and a Graduate Diploma (Journalism) from the University of Technology, Sydney.

The most notable of her published works is her 2005 novel titled Nice Day for a Murder. This piece of Australian crime fiction is part of the collection of works held at the National Library of Australia. Broadribb's range of writing genres is diverse: She has also written several short stories for children, having also written a popular children's book called Sarah's Adventure in 2006.

Broadribb is also an accomplished non-fiction writer, having written over 100 works for a broad range of publications. Her book reviews, film reviews and travellers’ guides have been published in many notable online publications including 21D Magazine, a not-for-profit literary and art magazine publishing “original works of fiction, non-fiction articles, poetry, photography, illustrations and other artwork”.

In the last year, she has published two humorous books about the auto-complete function on a popular internet search engine – Wisdom from the Web and I Tied an Onion to my Belt.

Other Projects: Chris Broadribb is the creator of the Best of Times Short Story Competition. Aimed at aspiring writers across Australia, this competition has been held twice yearly since 2006, with awards distributed in September and April.

== Published books ==
- I Tied an Onion to my Belt, 2015, ISBN 9781310356933
- Wisdom from the Web, 2014
- Sarah’s Adventure, 2006, ISBN 9781310516221
- Nice Day for a Murder, 2005, ISBN 1740083423

== Awards and other publications ==
- Joint Editors Award, ZineWest 2014
- Special Commendation, Scarlet Stiletto Awards, 2010
- Innovation Category, Scarlet Stiletto Awards, 2009
- Highly Commended, Katharine Susannah Prichard Speculative Fiction Award, 2004
