= Alex Hammond =

Australian crime fiction writer (born 1975)

Alex Hammond (born 25 December 1975 in Johannesburg, South Africa) is an Australian crime fiction writer. He is also published under the name A. W. Hammond.

== Life ==
In 1981 he emigrated to Australia with his family. He graduated in Law/Arts from Melbourne University in 2001 and worked for several law firms before becoming an editor and web manager for the University of Melbourne and later RMIT University.

== Author ==
In 1997, 1998, and 1999 he wrote several short stories for Inferno!, a periodical published by Black Library and Games Workshop. The short stories were "The Demon Bottle" in issue 1, "The Emperor's Grace" in issue 3, "A World Above" for issue 6, "Ancient Lances" in issue 11, and "Rat in the Walls" in issue 14. These were republished in the anthologies Into the Maelstrom (1999), Status: Deadzone (2002) and Let the Galaxy Burn (2006).

His first novel, Blood Witness (Penguin 2013), is a contemporary crime thriller set in Melbourne featuring defence lawyer Will Harris. It was short-listed for a Ned Kelly Award for Australian Crime Writing in 2014. It and its sequel, The Unbroken Line (Penguin 2015) were optioned for a TV Series.

Of his third novel, The Paris Collaborator (Echo 2021), The Sydney Morning Herald said he "artfully constructs this historical thriller within a paranoid and desperate city, creating plenty of twist and tension." The novel is set during the German occupation of Paris and follows former schoolteacher Auguste Duchene as he searches for missing people in the days before the battle for the city's liberation. In its sequel The Berlin Traitor (Echo 2023), Duchene finds himself in post-war Berlin, involved in the hunt for a Nazi war criminal and relying on his wits to survive the beginnings of the Cold War. In the final to the trilogy, The Moscow Defector, Duchene becomes the target of Soviet agents as he tries to find away out of the Berlin Blockade.

== Bibliography ==
=== Will Harris ===
- Blood Witness (2013)
- The Unbroken Line (2015)

=== Auguste Duchene ===
- The Paris Collaborator (2021)
- The Berlin Traitor (2023)
- The Moscow Defector (2025)

== Interviews ==
- Big Squid Podcast Author A.W. Hammond – The Berlin Traitor, September 2023
- Better Reading Podcast A.W. Hammond on the Moral Grey Areas of WWII, July 2021
- Final Draft - Great Conversations A.W. Hammond's The Paris Collaborator (Part One), June 2021
- The Sydney Morning Herald Alex Hammond's The Unbroken Line a legal thriller set in Melbourne, July 2015
- The West Australian Thriller genre the perfect choice, July 2013
- "Drive with Mary-Lou Stephens". ABC Brisbane. August 2013. Archived from the original on 10 December 2015.
