= Fabulous Nobodies =

1989 novel by Lee Tulloch

- Author: Lee Tulloch
- Publisher: William Morrow & Co.
- Publication date: April 26, 1989

Fabulous Nobodies: A Novel About a Girl Who's In Love with her Clothes is the first novel by Australian author and fashion journalist Lee Tulloch, published in 1989. It is described as a lighthearted yet devastatingly accurate social satire about the hip young fashion slaves of New York City's East Village in 1983.

== Summary ==
The story revolves around the bubbly, fashion-obsessed Reality Nirvana Tuttle (nicknamed 'Really'), an impoverished youth who struggles to be a trendsetter (a "somebody") with the help of her sassy gay friend Freddie, her Audrey Hepburn-esque friend Phoebe, and her closet full of couture frocks, bold wigs, and kitschy 1980's accessories. Working as a coveted doorgirl at the exclusive Less is More nightclub, Reality sees it as her solemn duty to help the seething mass of "nobodies" determine what is "in" and what is "out", while she herself begs, borrows, and steals to reach the forefront of the ever-changing fashion wave. But Reality's iron-clad faith in chiffon and Chanel is tested when she meets Hugo, a dashing, intelligent reporter who wants to look past all the clothing and expose the vulnerable girl buried beneath.

== Film adaptation ==
Julie Anne Quay, executive editor of V Fashion Magazine and CEO of Colac Pictures, has optioned the book for a screen adaptation, to be directed by R.J. Cutler, the acclaimed director of the fashion documentary The September Issue, featuring Anna Wintour.
