= Michelle Hamer (author) =

Australian writer and journalist

Michelle Hamer is an Australian writer and journalist. She is the author of twenty books published throughout the world. Hamer is a regular contributor to The Age newspaper in Melbourne and was previously an editor at the paper.

== Biography ==
Hamer attended Mornington High School in Melbourne and took up a journalism cadetship at age 19. She is a prolific journalist who has written for almost every capital city newspaper within Australia, as well as many national magazines including FHM Australia, Women's Health, Parents, Mother and Baby, Good Health and Medicine, New Idea, Woman's Day, Disney Adventures and New Woman. She has written for the Australian newspapers The Herald Sun, The Brisbane Courier Mail, The Tasmanian Mercury, The Canberra Times, The Sydney Morning Herald, The Adelaide Advertiser, The West Australian and The Financial Review.

Hamer co-wrote contemporary women's fiction under the name, Cate Kendall. The novel, Gucci Mamas (Random House) was an Australian bestseller.

Hamer's non-fiction titles include It Couldn't Happen to Me...But it Did (Lothian), How it Feels (New Holland) and Delivery by Appointment (New Holland). Hamer had four children's books published with Penguin Books in 2014 as part of the Our Australian Girl series. Our Australian Girl The titles include: Meet Daisy, Daisy all Alone, Daisy in the Mansion and Daisy on the Road.

Hamer has written eight non-fiction educational titles with Macmillan Publishing.

Hamer has taught professional writing at TAFE and presents writing and literature programs to children.

She lives in Melbourne, Victoria. She is represented by the Australian literary agent, Selwa Anthony.
