= Barbara Hanrahan =

Australian artist, writer (1939–1991)

- Barbara Janice Hanrahan c. 1968
- Born: 6 September 1939; Adelaide, South Australia
- Died: 1 December 1991 (aged 52); Adelaide, South Australia
- Known for: Printmaking, Writing
- Partner: Jo Steele

Barbara Janice Hanrahan (6 September 1939 – 1 December 1991) was an Australian artist, printmaker and writer whose work featured relationships, women, women's issues and feminist ideology. Hanrahan was also known for her writings and short stories featuring coming of age stories that were somewhat biographical.

== Early life ==
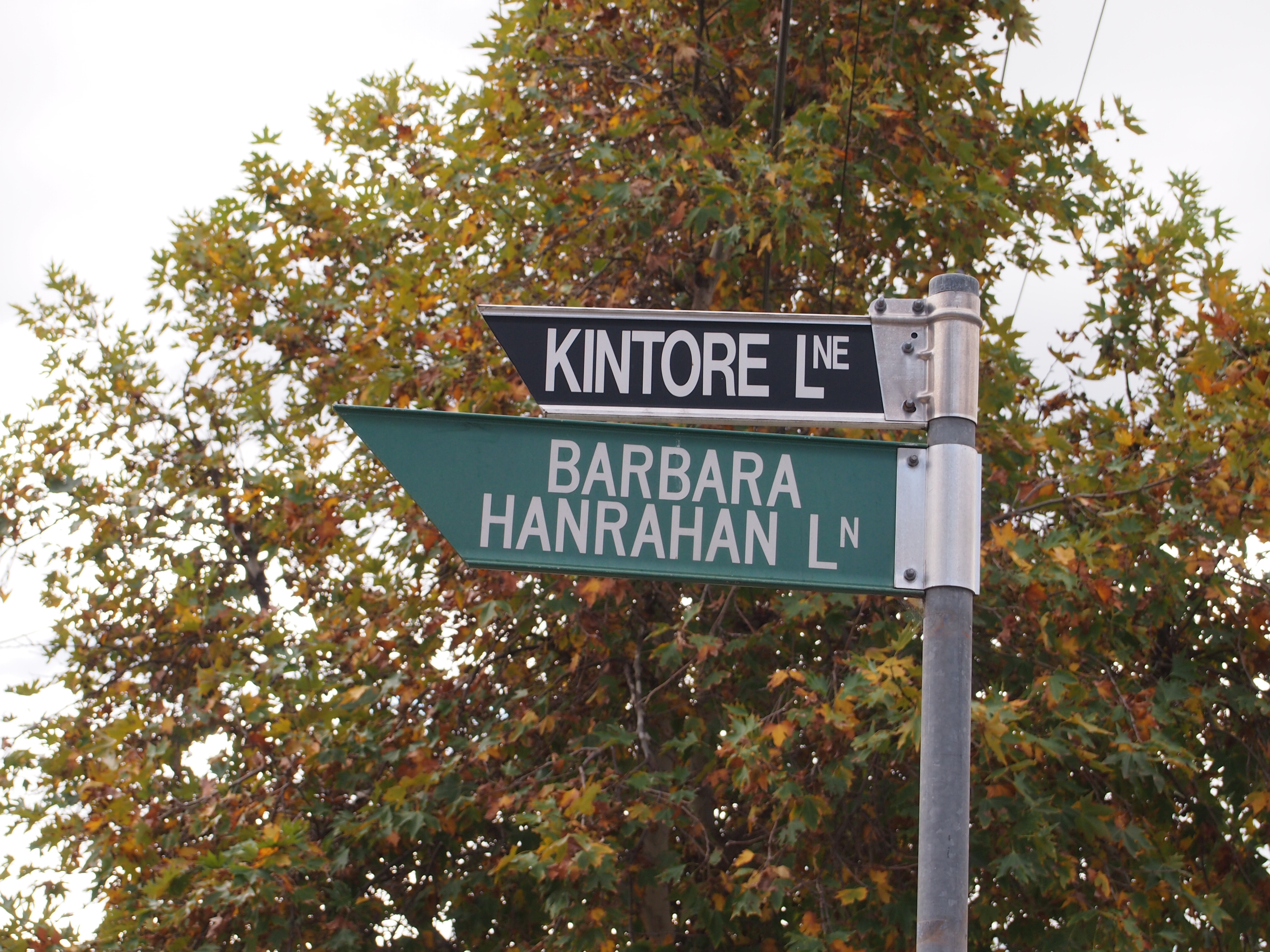
Barbara Hanrahan Lane, Mile End

Barbara Hanrahan was born in Adelaide, South Australia in 1939. After her father's death at the age of 26 from tuberculosis in 1940, when Hanrahan was just a year old, she lived with her mother (a commercial artist), her grandmother, and her great-aunt (who had Down syndrome). This matriarchal household is often correctly thought of as the inspiration for much of Hanrahan's art, as well as the suburb she was raised in, the inner-western Adelaide suburb of Thebarton. Her mother later remarried.

Hanrahan attended Thebarton Primary School and Thebarton Technical School. Hanrahan went on to study a diploma in art teaching from Adelaide Teachers' College, while also taking classes at the South Australian School of Arts (1957-1960). In 1963, when Hanrahan was 23 she moved to London to take a break from teaching tertiary art in Adelaide. Hanrahan furthered her studies at the Central School of Art in London.

"I wanted to try my life at something bigger. I wanted to get away from safety and walking with little steps." - Hanrahan on moving to London.

== Career ==
In 1960, Hanrahan began printmaking, working with her German lecturer and print master, Udo Sellbach. In 1961, Hanrahan won the Cornell Prize for painting. In 1962, she served as president of the South Australian Graphic Art Society. In 1963, at the age of 24, she left Adelaide to study at the Royal College of Art in London. She lived mostly in England until the early 1980s, with her partner, sculptor Jo Steele. Hanrahan also lectured for a time at the Falmouth in Cornwall and Portsmouth College of Art. During this time she returned periodically to Adelaide to teach at the South Australian School of Art and to organise her one-woman exhibitions, and she eventually returned there to live permanently. Her first exhibition was at the Contemporary Art Society Gallery in Adelaide in December 1964.

Upon her return Hanrahan was also a member of the Australian Women's Art Movement and the Women's Art Register. Both organisations strived for equal pay for female artists as well as increased exposure.

Hanrahan often combined writing with visual arts. She kept a diary in her late teenage years, and then again in London to make sense of a strange city. She began writing her first book, The Scent of Eucalyptus (1973), a semi-autobiographical consideration of her childhood in the 1940s and 1950s in Thebarton, shortly after the death of her grandmother in 1968. Her edited diaries were published in 1998, revealing less than favourable comments about many of her contemporaries, although some friends and colleagues commented that it was interesting to understand how Hanrahan's brain worked. A biography by Annette Marion Stewart was published in the same year.

== Art ==
Hanrahan was a painter and printmaker, experimenting with printing styles such as screen printing, etching, relief printing, and woodblock and lino cutting. She would often revisit the same print in different styles and colours, such as Wedding Night, which has three variations.

Hanrahan's work is personal and private yet its themes are universal, portraying relationships between girlfriends, women and men, and the struggle against societal structures. These themes are constantly repeated throughout her oeuvre in prints, such as in Wedding night (1977) and Dear Miss Ethel Barringer (1975). Both works depict Hanrahan's unease with women's roles in society, such as the juggling act in Dear Miss Ethel Barringer, of a woman having to play multiple roles at once, and her unease with society's outdated values. By the 1960s many women were not virgins at the time of marriage, and Hanrahan's Wedding Night depicts the outdated assumption that for consummation to happen the woman must be pure. Wedding night captures the moment of unease between the couple, with the lack of intimacy shown by the gap between them. "Wedding night has shocked people since its creation by its refutation of romance of the event," writes Alison Carrol.

Hanrahan's work is described as exploring the "themes of society and its norms, its expectations and its conventions and how the individual fares therein - buffeted and withstanding, weak and strong. She particularly analyses the relationship between men and women, often through their sexuality, and, as well, the relationship of the generations. The subjects are clearly chosen, gleaned from a lifetime of careful looking, listening, reading, digesting and remembering."

Critic and art historian Alison Carroll draws parallels between the simplicity of Hanrahan's scenes and David Hockney's pop art; “Hanrahan uses Hockney, but, in her best work of the periods, she moves on considerably from him; she achieves a high emotional pitch, working with uncomfortable themes of love, family and relationships and using awkward childlike form. The process goes far beyond the easy, self-controlled world of Pop art.” Carroll implies that the simplicity in both Hanrahan and Hockney's drawings are similar. Hanrahan, however, strays from the pop art formula and creates complex feelings between the characters in her works and the viewer and the works.

== Exhibitions ==
Hanrahan exhibited her artwork internationally, including in London, Italy, Japan, New Zealand, Sweden, Scotland, the United States and Canada. Her artwork is collected in numerous galleries in Australia, including the National Gallery of Australia. Her work Generations (1991) was used as the cover art for Mixed matches : interracial marriage in Australia, by June Duncan Owen.

== Holdings ==
The National Gallery of Australia holds some 453 of her drawings and prints. The Art Gallery of South Australia also holds over 200 of her prints. The National Gallery of Victoria holds six of her works, while QAGOMA holds 20, and the Art Gallery of New South Wales holds 17.

== Writing ==
Hanrahan's books were just as expressive and confronting as her artworks. Her books such as the Scent of Eucalyptus are described as breaking the suburban female mould, "in- scribing the female sexual, reproductive and excretory body in text".

Her novels often had a main character similar to Hanrahan herself. Annette Stewart writes about the difficulty in being able to distinguish fact from fiction. "Confusion between reality and the imagination was key to barbara writing, lending it a particular and distinctive atmosphere."

Hanrahan's book, Sea Green features a narrator, Virginia and her move from Adelaide, South Australia to London. Sea Green is autobiographical, Virginia is Barbara. The book is reminiscent and nostalgic for the place where she once lived.

Hanrahan's novel, Michael and Me and the Sun, documents her sexual encounters on her journey to London and the relationships she had. Again it is both fictional and autobiographical, Hanrahan using a main character similar to herself. Like Hanrahan's art, her writing was also punchy and to the point. She documented the patriarchal facts of finding a man "To be popular on the ship you had to be willing to iron, and the men came along to the ironing room looking helpless."

This tension in relationships and their roles was expressed in her writings and art.

In March 1988, she wrote a celebrated column, "Weird Adelaide", that appeared in The Adelaide Review.

Hanrahan concludes: "What we want now in Adelaide are writers and artists who work from the heart of those commonplace suburban streets, who recognise the weirdness of the ordinary, who record it before the version of it we have now is swept away. We want passion and intensity, an art that comes from places like Port Adelaide and Thebarton and Holden Hill; that stays unofficially weird."

The column was republished in the 1989 anthology Eight Voices of the Eighties : Stories, Journalism and Criticism by Australian Women, edited by Gillian Whitlock. It was also referenced in a short story, In Sunshine or in Shadow, by Kerryn Goldsworthy, published in The Adelaide Review in March 2003. The column was then commemorated and partially reproduced in June 2020 in The Adelaide Review.

== Works ==
- The Scent of Eucalyptus (1973)
- Sea-Green (1974)
- The Albatross Muff (1977)
- Where the Queens All Strayed (1978)
- The Peach Groves (1980)
- The Frangipani Gardens (1980)
- Dove (1982)
- Kewpie Doll (1984)
- Annie Magdalene (1985)
- Dream People (1987)
- A Chelsea Girl (1987)
- Flawless Jade (1989)
- Iris in her Garden (1991)
- Michael and Me and the Sun (1992)
- Good Night Mr Moon (1992)
- The Diaries of Barbara Hanrahan, edited by Elaine Lindsay (1998)

== Legacy ==
The Barbara Hanrahan Fellowship for South Australian writers was established in Hanrahan's memory in 1994 by her partner, Jo Steele. A street in Thebarton is named after her, and in 1997 a building at the University of South Australia's City West campus was named to honour her memory.

Many of her papers and unpublished writings are held at the National Library of Australia.
