= Cassandra O'Leary =

Australian author, freelance writer and communications professional

Cassandra O'Leary is an Australian romance and women's fiction author and freelance writer/communications professional based in Melbourne, Australia. She won the global "We Heart New Talent" writing contest run by HarperCollins UK in 2015, and her debut novel, Girl on a Plane, was published in 2016.

== Personal and early life ==
O'Leary was born in Dandenong, Victoria and attended St John's Regional College between 1987 and 1992. She holds a Bachelor of Communications (Public Relations) from Monash University, graduating top of her class in 1998. She is married with two children and lives in Melbourne's south-east suburbs.

== Career ==
Cassandra O'Leary worked for many years as a communications professional, marketing communications consultant and PR advisor at organisations including RMIT University when she took up fiction writing. She was working on romantic fiction and romantic comedy novels and entered many writing competitions beginning in 2014. She was a finalist in the 2014 First Kiss contest, Romance Writers of Australia, and the 2015 Lone Star contest, Northwest Houston Romance Writers of America.

In 2015, O'Leary won the global We Heart New Talent contest run by HarperCollins UK, and her debut novel, Girl on a Plane, was subsequently published in July 2016 by the digital first imprint, Avon Maze. Girl on a Plane was an iBooks top 20 bestseller in both the UK and Australia. The novel has now been contracted for an international translation in the Czech Republic in both ebook and print.

Also in 2016, O'Leary was a finalist in the Best New Author category, AusRom Today Reader's Choice Awards. She has been interviewed by book bloggers and podcasters and has written guest posts for international blogs including the Pink Heart Society and We Heart Writing. She also appeared on a panel at the Australian Romance Readers Convention in February 2017.

Cassandra O'Leary is a member of the Romance Writers of Australia, Romance Writers of America and Writers Victoria.

=== Bibliography ===
- Heart Note: A Christmas romcom novella, independently published, 2017
- Girl on a Plane, Avon Maze/HarperCollins UK, 2016
- Chocolate Truffle Kiss: A novelette, independently published, 2016
- Sweet and Spicy (contributor), Melbourne Romance Writers Guild, 2016
- Taste of Romance (contributor), Melbourne Romance Writers Guild, 2017
