= Jessie Urquhart =

Australian journalist and novelist

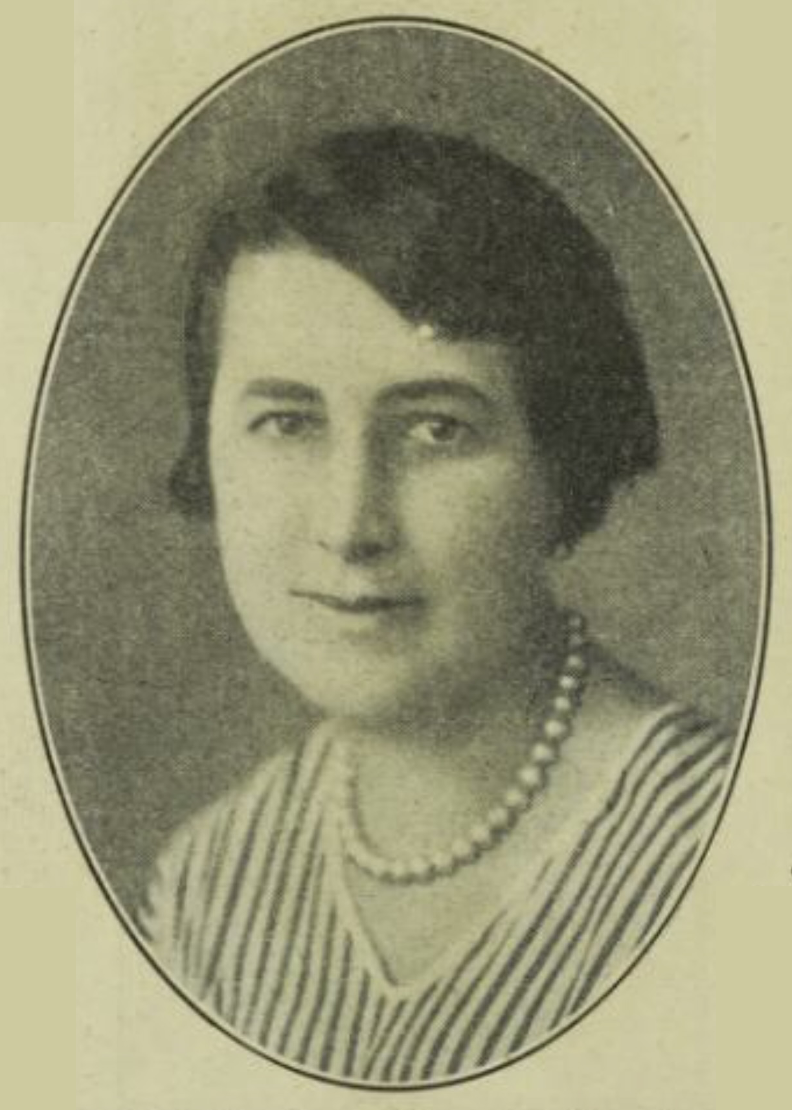
- Jessie Urquhart in 1932
- Born: 1890; Sydney, New South Wales, Australia
- Died: 12 April 1948 (aged 57–58); St John's Wood, London, England
- Occupations: novelist, journalist, short-story writer

Jessie Urquhart (1890 – 12 April 1948) was an Australian journalist, novelist and short-story writer.

== Early life ==
Jessie Urquhart was born in Sydney in 1890, younger daughter of William (c.1861–1931) and Elizabeth Barsby Urquhart (née Gault) (c.1861–1916). Her father, who was a gaol administrator, had migrated from Scotland in 1884, while her mother was from Leicester, England.

== Career ==
As well as writing three novels, Urquhart wrote stories for The School Magazine published by the NSW Department of Education for primary school students, some of which had appeared previously in The Sydney Morning Herald. She also contributed short stories to The Australian Woman's Mirror, The Bulletin and The Australian Women's Weekly. During her years in England she reported on the London literary scene.

Urquhart was a member of the Society of Women Writers and acted as secretary from 1932 until her departure for England in 1934.

In 1935, Zora Cross wrote of Urquhart that "she will not, I think, do her best work until, like Alice Grant Rosman, she relinquishes journalism for fiction".

== Personal life ==
Urquhart died in a nursing home in St John's Wood, London on 12 April 1948. She was survived by her sister, Eliza Urquhart (1885–1968).

== Works ==
- Wayside, Angus & Robertson, 1919
- Maryplace: The Story of Three Women and Three Men, Nicholson & Watson, 1934
- Giving Amber Her Chance, Endeavour Press, 1934
