= Joanne Fedler =

Australian author

- Born: 1957 (age 68–69); Johannesburg, South Africa
- Occupation: Novelist

Joanne Fedler (born 1967) is an Australian author. She is the author of 16 books including Secret Mothers' Business; When Hungry, Eat; and Your Story: How to Write It so Others Will Want to Read It.

== Biography ==
Fedler was born in South Africa and has studied law in both South Africa and the US. She has law degrees from the University of the Witwatersrand and from Yale which she attended on a Fulbright scholarship in 1993. She was a lecturer in law at the University of the Witwatersrand from 1994–1995.

== Books ==
Her first novel, The Dreamcloth, was published by Jacana Media in 2005. The Dreamcloth was nominated for the Sunday Times Fiction Prize in 2006. Jennifer Crocker wrote that "The Dreamcloth marks a watershed moment in South African fiction."

In 2006, her book Secret Mothers' Business was published in Australia by Allen & Unwin. It has also been published in South Africa and the United Kingdom, with rights sold in Germany, Czechoslovakia, and Croatia. To date it has sold over 600,000 copies worldwide.

She is also the author of Things Without A Name, a contemporary love story set in the world of rape and domestic violence, published by Allen & Unwin (2008); When Hungry, Eat (2010), Allen & Unwin; It Doesn't Have to Be So Hard: the Secrets to Finding and Keeping Intimacy, co-authored with Graeme Friedman, (2012) Random House; The Reunion, published by Allen & Unwin (2012); and Love in the Time of Contempt: Consolation for Parents of Teenagers, Hardie Grant Books (2015).

== Activism ==
Joanne Fedler has made appearances at the Sydney Writers Festival, the Jewish Sydney Writers Festival, the Dymocks Literacy Foundation Great Debate, and the Gidget Foundation to raise money for post-natal depression.

In 1996, she set up a legal advocacy centre to end violence against women of which she was the CEO until 1998.

=== Bibliography ===
Books

- The Whale's Last Song, Fourth Estate, 2024
- Unbecoming, Serenity Press, 2020
- The Reunion, Arena, 2012
- When Hungry, Eat, Allen & Unwin, 2010
- Things Without A Name, Allen & Unwin, 2008
- Secret Mothers' Business, Allen & Unwin, 2006
- The Dreamcloth, Jacana Media, 2005
- 25 Essential Things you should do before getting married, sixtyminutebooks, 2003
- An Endless Ball of String, The Life Story Project, Sydney, 2004
- My Maria, The Life Story Project, Sydney, 2003
- Ideological Virgins and Other Myths: six principles for legal revisioning, co-editor, Law Race and Gender Unit, UCT and Justice College, 2001
- Reclaiming Women's Spaces: New Perspectives on Violence against women in South Africa, Nisaa Institute for Women's Development, co-editor with Yoon Park and Zubeda Dangor, 2000
- Tshwaranang National Legal Manual for Counsellors of Raped and Battered Women, Progress Press, Johannesburg, South Africa 1999

Selected academic articles

- 'The idea of changing places in intercultural communication,' Communitas Journal for Community Communication and Information Impact, (with Ilze Olckers), vol 6, 2001 at 1.
- 'Affirmative Action for South African women through the Employment Equity Act: will women benefit economically?' Lola Press, April 2000.
- 'Violence against women,' in chapter on Equality, LAWSA, Butterworths, 1997.
- 'Pornography: Reasonable and Justifiable Limitations,' in The Constitution of South Africa from a Gender Perspective, edited by Sandra Liebenberg, The Community Law Centre, University of the Western Cape, 1995 at 143.
- 'A Feminist Perspective on Pornography,' in Between Speech and Silence: Hate Speech, Pornography and the New South Africa, edited by Jane Duncan, FXI and IDASA, 1996 at 44.
- 'The Right to Life,' in Constitutional Law of South Africa loose-leaf service, eds Chaskalson et al., 1996, Juta & Co.
- 'Lawyering Domestic Violence through the Prevention of Family Violence Act: an evaluation after a year in operation,' 1995 South African Law Journal 112 at 231.
- 'Legal Education in South Africa,' 72 Oregon Law Review (1993) at 999.
- 'On Dual Becomings: Towards Womanist Lawyering,' 1994 Agenda 21.
- 'The Reasonable Man in a Post-Apartheid South Africa,' 3 Wits University Student Law Review 1991 at 1.
- 'The Inequitable Contract and the Role of South African Courts,' 2 Wits University Student Law Review 1990 at 56.
