= Paul Mitchell (writer) =

Australian author

Paul Mitchell (born 1968) is an author of five books in Melbourne.

== Reception ==
His most recent book is the novel, We. Are. Family., dealing with the generational effect of family violence. The Australian said the novel "asks us if it is possible to escape the subjectivity of our pasts, or do the male voices in our heads sentence us to a lifetime of judgment by their standards? Ultimately, We. Are. Family. might be read as a tale of redemption and hope.” and The Age said "Mitchell is a terse and observant writer, as alive to the particulars of Aussie idiom and experience as Tim Winton, but less showy . . . It’s hard to write about the thwarts and flaws of conventional masculinity without coming across as either too harsh or too sentimental. Mitchell succeeds in doing so."

Mitchell's 2014 poetry collection, Standard Variation (Walleah Press) gained a short-listing for the 2016 Adelaide Writers' Week John Bray Poetry Award,, while his debut collection, Minorphysics (IP 2003), won the IP PIcks Award for an Unpublished Australian Poetry manuscript. Mitchell has appeared at the Melbourne Writers Festival, Australian Short Story Festival and others, and he has won national awards for his short fiction. His poetry, essays and stories have been published in newspapers, magazines and journals including The Age, The Sunday Age, Best Australian Stories and Poems, Meanjin, Griffith Review, Overland, ABC Religion and Ethics and The Big Issue.

Mitchell's 2015 play Ragdoll was a work of fiction that drew upon two Australian cases of patricide: Arthur Freeman throwing his child Darcy from Melbourne's Westgate Bridge, and Robert Farquharson driving his three children into a dam near Winchelsea. The play, performed by Silas Aiton and directed by Debra Low, was staged at Melbourne's La Mama Theatre as part of the 2015 Melbourne Writer's Theatre/Hoi Polloy production of one-act plays called DarkLight. Helen Garner said of this work that it was "a challenging psychological and emotional exploration . . . a contribution to a desperately needed national conversation [that] will deepen and enrich it in very significant ways.”

== Bibliography ==
=== Fiction ===
- Dodging the Bull (short fiction), Wakefield Press, 2007
- We. Are. Family. (novel), MidnightSun Publishing, 2016

=== Poetry ===
- Minorphysics, Interactive Productions, 2003
- Awake Despite the Hour (poetry), Five Islands Press, 2007
- Standard Variation (poetry), Walleah Press, 2014

=== Performance works ===
- Sleepless in Braybrook (writer, performer) — Yarraville Festival 2002
- Get the Word (writer, performer, with Bill Buttler) — Melbourne University Festival 2005; Gasworks Theatre
- Elemental (writer and performer) — Melbourne Festival 2009
- Being a Wheel Family (writer, performer) — Melbourne Fringe Festival 2013
- Ragdoll (writer; performed by Silas Aiton, directed by Debra Low) — La Mama Theatre 2015
