= Damian McDonald (writer) =

- Occupation: novelist
- Writing career
- Notable work: Luck in the Greater West

Damian McDonald is a contemporary Australian novelist. His novel Luck in the Greater West won the ABC Fiction Award in 2007 and was published later that year. He was a curator at the Powerhouse Museum in Sydney at the time.
