= Selma Cook =

Australian writer

Selma A. Cook is managing editor of the Youth Section and Volunteer Youth Resource Network at IslamOnline.

== Life ==
Selma A. Cook became a Muslim in 1988 in her native country of Australia. She migrated to Egypt in 1993.

She has written a book about her journey to Islam called The Miracles of My Life, an Islamic poetry book called The Light of Submission, as well as the Miss Moppy series (Islamic stories for children).

She wrote her first Islamic novel for teenagers called Buried Treasure, which is the first in the ‘Amirah Stevenson series'. She writes articles and poetry on her Website The Islamic Garden.

She works for Hoda, a Cairo-based satellite channel.

== Works ==
- "A Gentle Nature So Hard to Find", oneummah
- "From Isolation to Islam". Radiance. XLV (10). 16 September 2007. Archived from the original on 30 April 2009.
- Abdur-Rahman ibn Hasan Al Ash-Sheikh, Selma Cook (2001). Divine Triumph: Explanatory Notes on the Book of Tawheed. Dar Al-Manarah. ISBN 978-977-6005-18-1.
- Fatḥī Yakan, Nawawī, Muḥammad Muḥammad ʻAbd al-Fattāḥ, Selma Cook (2007). What Dies it Mean to be a Muslim?: With a Selection of Authentic Qudsî (sacred) Hadîths, with An-Nawawî's Forty Hadiths = Mādhā Yaʻnī Intimāʼī Lil-Islām? : Maʻa Hadīyat Mukhtārāt Min ṣaḥīḥ Al-Aḥādīth Al-Qudsīyah, Maʻa Al-Arbaʻīn Al-Nawawīyah. Dar Al-Manarah. ISBN 978-977-6005-38-9.
- Saʻīd Ḥawwá; ʻIzzat Abū Zaīd; Selma Cook (2003). Allah: The Lord of Glory, Honor, and Majesty. Dar Al-Salam. ISBN 978-977-342-136-6.

=== Edited ===
- Imam At-Tirmidhi. Selma Cook (ed.). The Characteristics of Prophet Muhammad (Shamâ´il al-MuHammadiyyah). Translator Bahaa Addiin Ibrahim Ahmed Shalaby. Dar Al-Manarah.

=== Anthologies ===
- Pamela Taylor (ed.). Muslim Voices Poetry Anthology 2006. lulu.
