= Rebecca Johnson (author) =

Australian writer for children

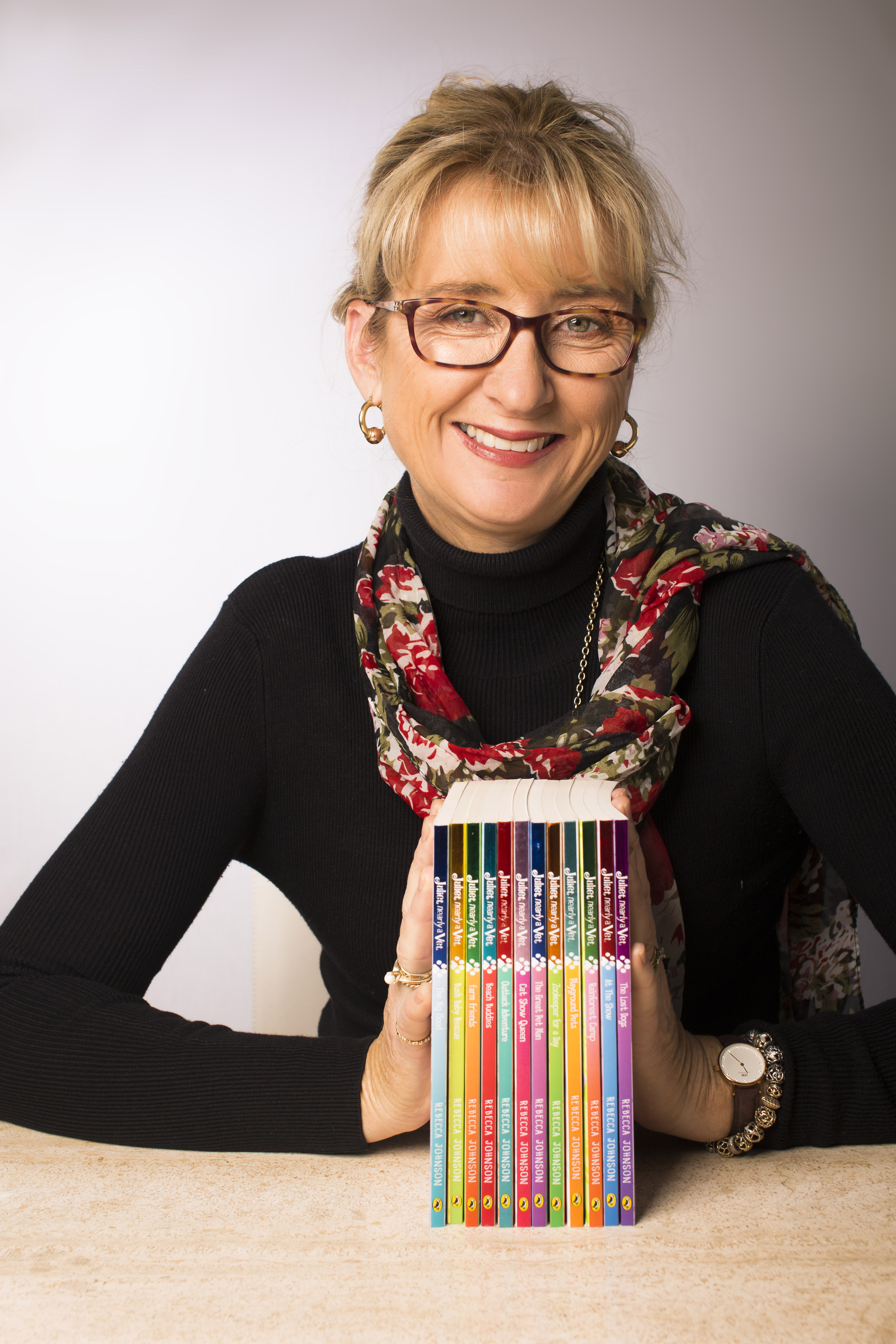
- Occupations: Writer, teacher
- Writing career
- Language: English
- Genre: Children's literature
- Website: www.rebeccajohnson.com.au

Rebecca Johnson (born 1966) is an Australian author and primary-school science teacher who has written more than 100 children's books. Her works include the Steve Parish Story Book collection, the Juliet – Nearly a Vet series, the Insect Series, and the Steve Parish Reptiles & Amphibians Story Book range.

== Reception ==
Johnson's Steve Parish Story Book collection has sold more than 3.5 million books, and her Insect Series won the 2014 Whitley Commendation for Best Educational Series. Her Juliet – Nearly A Vet series won the 2014 Wilderness Society Environment Award for Children's Literature. It was also nominated in the CBCA Younger Readers' category in 2014 and 2015, and for the Adelaide Festival Awards for Literature 2014.

In August 2017, Rebecca won the 2017 Wilderness Society award for Rainforest Camp: Juliet Nearly a Vet. She also released two new series in 2017 – Vet Cadets and First Fact Dinosaurs. Her first book in the Vet Cadets series, Welcome to Willowdale, was shortlisted for the Western Australians Young Book Readers Book Award in February 2018.

== Career ==
Johnson has been a primary-school teacher for more than 30 years, including 22 years at Windaroo State School in Queensland, where she won the 2015 Prime Minister's Prize for Excellence in Science Teaching in Primary Schools.

Johnson relates that her first novel, Juliet – Nearly A Vet, was inspired by a retired veterinarian who lived next door to her when she was a child. The first book in the series of 12 was published by Penguin in 2013, and the series is now being published in Norwegian, Czech, Slovak and Portuguese.

Her Steve Parish series of nature books includes more than 60 titles that have sold more than 3.5 million copies. Her Insect Series, which has links to the Australian Curriculum, won the 2014 Whitley Award for Best Children's Series.

== Personal life ==
Johnson is married with two children. She lives in Queensland and continues to write books and teach science at Windaroo State School.
