= Trish Wylie =

Irish author of category romance novels

- Born: County Antrim, Northern Ireland
- Occupation: novelist
- Writing career
- Period: 2002–present
- Genre: Romance
- Website: www.trishwylie.com

Trish Wylie is an Irish author of category romance novels.

== Biography ==
Wylie was born in County Antrim in Northern Ireland. As a teenager, Wylie voraciously read Harlequin romance novels and often told her friends that she would one day write for the publishing house. After she left school she tried briefly to write novels, but decided that she needed more life experience before her novels would be realistic. She began writing again years later, and, after two rounds of revisions, Harlequin purchased her first manuscript, The Bridal Bet. Romantic Times described this first novel, published in 2005, as an "amusing yet strongly emotional and sexy story."

Wyile has been twice nominated for a Romantic Times Reviewer's Choice Award, winning in 2005.

== Works ==
- The Bridal Bet (2003)
- Her Real-Life Hero (2005)
- Her Unexpected Baby (2005)
- Marriage Lost and Found (2005)
- The Wedding Surprise (2006)
- O'Reilly's Bride (2006)
- Project: Parenthood (2006)
- White Hot (2006)
- Breathless! (2007)
- Rescued: Mother-to-Be (2007)
- Bride of the Emerald Isle (2007)
- The Return of the Rebel (2007)
- The Firefighter's Chosen Bride (2007)
- His Mistress: His Terms (2008)
- Her One And Only Valentine (2008)
