= Helen Conrad =

American novelist

- Born: April 11, 1944 (age 82); Pasadena, California, U.S.
- Occupation: Novelist
- Writing career
- Pen name: Jena Hunt; Raye Morgan
- Period: 1982–present
- Genre: Romance
- Website: helenonthecoast.wordpress.com

Helen Conrad (born April 11, 1944) is a best-selling American writer of over 55 romance novels since 1982. She has also written under the names Jena Hunt and Raye Morgan.

== Biography ==
Helen Conrad was born in Pasadena, California, but grew up in the Netherlands, Guam, and Washington, D.C. She obtained a B.A. in English Lit.

After years of writing romantic suspense in the style of Mary Stewart and children's books in a lot of styles, finally she published her romance novels in 1982.

She married a geologist/computer scientist, and they had four sons. Now, she lives in the Los Angeles area with her husband and two of her four sons.

== Bibliography ==
=== As Jena Hunt ===
==== Single Novels ====
- Sweeter than Wine (1982)
- Sweet Victory (1982)
- Home for Christmas (1982)
- Proud Possession (1983)
- Jade Tide (1983)
- Traces of Indigo (1989)

=== As Helen Conrad ===
==== Single Novels ====
- Temptation's Sting (1983)
- Undercover Affair (1983)
- Heart of Gold (1983)
- Everlasting (1984)
- Native Silver (1984)
- Reach for Paradise (1985)
- Tears of Gold (1985)
- A Stroke of Genius (1985)
- Double Exposure (1986)
- Diamond in the Rough (1986)
- Wild Temptation (1986)
- At His Command (1986)
- Something Wild and Free (1986)
- Wife for a Night (1987)
- Tender Fury (1987)
- Desperado (1988)
- Chasing Dreams (1988)
- Silver Linings (1989)
- Stranger's Embrace (1992)
- Joe's Miracle (1992)
- Jake's Promise (1993)
- The Reluctant Daddy (1996)

==== Hometown Reunion Series Multi-Author ====
- Those Baby Blues (1996)

==== Omnibus ====
- Unexpected Son / The Reluctant Daddy (2005) (with Marisa Carroll)

=== As Raye Morgan ===
==== Single Novels ====
- Summer Wind (1983)
- Embers of the Sun (1983)
- Roses Never Fade (1986)
- Too Many Babies (1990)
- Baby Aboard (1991)
- In a Marrying Mood (1991)
- Almost a Bride (1992)
- Caution: Charm at Work (1993)
- The Bachelor (1993)
- Wife by Contract (1998)
- The Hand-picked Bride (1998)
- Promoted-To Wife! (2000)
- Secret Dad (2000)
- The Boss's Baby Mistake (2001)
- Working Overtime (2001)
- A Little Moonlighting (2002)
- The Boss's Pregnancy Proposal (2007)
- Her Valentine Blind Date (2008)

==== Angeli Series ====
1. Crystal Blue Horizon (1984)
2. A Lucky Streak (1987)

==== Ames Series ====
1. Husband for Hire (1988)
2. Ladies' Man (1989)

==== Caine Family Series ====
1. Sorry, the Bride Has Escaped (1994)
2. Babies on the Doorstep (1994)
3. The Daddy Due Date (1994)
4. Yesterday's Outlaw (1994)

==== The Baby Shower Series ====
1. Instant Dad (1994)
2. A Gift for Baby (1994)
3. Baby Dreams (1996)
4. Babies by the Busload (1996)

==== Having the Boss's Baby Series Multi-Author ====
- She's Having My Baby! (2002)

==== Catching the Crown Series ====
1. Jack and the Princess (2003)
2. Betrothed to the Prince (2003)
3. Royal Nights (2003)
4. Counterfeit Princess (2003)

==== Logan's Legacy Series Multi-Author ====
- Undercover Passion (2004)

==== Boardroom Brides Series ====
1. The Boss, the Baby and Me (2005)
2. Trading Places with the Boss (2005)
3. The Boss's Special Delivery (2005)

==== The Brides Of Bella Lucia Series Multi-Author ====
- 03. The Rebel Prince (2006)

==== Nine to Five Series Multi-Author ====
- The Boss's Double Trouble Twins (2007)

==== Royal House of Niroli Series Multi-Author ====
- Bride By Royal Appointment (2008)

==== Omnibus In Collaboration ====
- Wanted: Mother (1996) (with Annette Broadrick and Ginna Gray)
- The Wedding Arrangement (2003) (with Barbara Boswell)
- Small Wonders (2004) (with Candace Camp, Ann Major and Dallas Schulze)
- Mail-Order Wives (2006) (with Charlotte Douglas)
