= Leah Ashton =

Australian author of contemporary romance

- Occupation: Novelist
- Writing career
- Period: 2001 – present
- Genres: Romance, contemporary
- Notable work: Why Resist a Rebel?
- Notable awards: RITA award – Short Contemporary Romance; 2014 Why Resist a Rebel?
- Website: www.leah-ashton.com

Leah Ashton is an Australian author of contemporary romance.

== Biography ==
Ashton lives in Perth, Western Australia and works as an IT Project Manager at a university.

== Bibliography ==
=== Stand-alone works ===
- Secrets and Speed Dating. Harlequin. June 2012 [2012]. ISBN 9780373178155.
- A Girl Less Ordinary. Harlequin. October 2012 [2012]. ISBN 9780373178407.
- Why Resist a Rebel?. Harlequin. April 2013 [2013]. ISBN 9780373207107.
- Beware of the Boss. Harlequin. December 2013 [2013]. ISBN 9780373207435.
- Nine Month Countdown. Harlequin. December 2014 [2014]. ISBN 9781460344507.
- Out Run the Night. Leah Ashton. March 2020. ISBN 978-0648440079
- Defiant. Leah Ashton. April 2019. ISBN 978-0648440024

== Awards and reception ==
Awards for Leah Ashton
Year	Nominated work	Category	Award	Result	Notes	Ref.
2014	Why Resist a Rebel?	Short Contemporary Romance	Romance Writers of America RITA Award	Won		
2020	Out Run the Night	Romantic Suspense	Romance Writers of Australia Ruby Award	Won		
