= Jennie Adams =

Australian writer

Jennifer Ann Ryan
- Born: 1963 (age 62–63); New South Wales, Australia
- Occupation: Novelist
- Children: 3
- Writing career
- Pen name: Jennie Adams
- Period: 2004–present
- Genres: Romance, Children's fiction
- Website: www.jennieadams.net

Jennie Adams (born Jennifer Ann Ryan; 1963 in New South Wales, Australia) is an Australian writer of romance novels since 2005. She is a Waldenbooks bestseller and Romantic Times Reviewers' Choice Award winner. She has sold hundreds of thousands of her novels in over a dozen foreign-languages in countries as South Africa, Spain, Poland, Russia, India, and Japan. She also has had articles and short stories published in magazines and periodicals in Australia and overseas and children's publications.

== Biography ==
Jennifer Ann Ryan was born in 1963 in a small country town in New South Wales, Australia. She had three adult children. She worked part-time in the health care industry. She obtained an accreditation in Writing Studies from The Writing School. She is active in encouraging Aboriginal artists.

== Bibliography ==
=== Single novels ===
- The Boss's Convenient Bride (2005/Mar)
- Parents of Convenience (2005/Jun)
- Memo: Marry Me? (2007/May)
- To Love And To Cherish (2008/Jan)
- Promoted: Secretary to Bride! (2008/Nov)
- Nine-to-Five Bride (2009/Fev)
- What's A Housekeeper To Do? (2010/Jun)
- Passionate Chef, Ice Queen Boss (2010/Sep)
- Daycare Mum to Wife (2011/2) a.k.a. Daycare Mom to Wife
- Once Upon a Time in Tarrula (2011/Sep) a.k.a. His Plain-Jane Cinderella
- Invitation to the Prince's Palace (2012)

=== Gable Sisters ===
1. Her Millionaire Boss (2006/Aug)
2. The Italian Single Dad (2007/Jul)
3. The Boss's Unconventional Assistant (2007/Oct)

=== MacKay Brothers ===
1. Australian Boss: Diamond Ring (2009/Dec)
2. Surprise: Outback Proposal (2011/Jan)
