= Aurealis Award for Best Horror Novel =

Annual Australian award for horror

- Awarded for: Excellence in horror fiction novels
- Country: Australia
- Presented by: Chimaera Publications; Queensland Writers Centre
- First award: 1995
- Currently held by: Chris Flynn
- Website: Official site

The Aurealis Awards are presented annually by the Australia-based Chimaera Publications and Queensland Writers Centre to published works in order to "recognise the achievements of Australian science fiction, fantasy, horror writers". To qualify, a work must have been first published by an Australian citizen or permanent resident between 1 November of the prior year and 31 October of the corresponding year; the presentation ceremony is held the following year. It has grown from a small function of around 20 people to a two-day event attended by over 200 people.

Since their creation in 1995, awards have been given in various categories of speculative fiction. Categories currently include science fiction, fantasy, horror, speculative young adult fiction—with separate awards for novels and short fiction—collections, anthologies, illustrative works or graphic novels, children's books, and an award for excellence in speculative fiction. The awards have attracted the attention of publishers by setting down a benchmark in science fiction and fantasy. The continued sponsorship by publishers such as HarperCollins and Orbit has identified the award as an honour to be taken seriously.

The results are decided by a panel of judges from a list of submitted nominees; the long-list of nominees is reduced to a short-list of finalists. Ties can occur if the panel decides both entries show equal merit, however they are encouraged to choose a single winner. The judges may declare a "no award" if there is unanimous agreement that none of the nominees are worthy. The judges are selected from a public application process by the Award's management team.

This article lists all the short-list nominees and winners in the best horror novel category, as well as novels that have received honourable mentions or have been highly commended. Since 2005, honourable mentions and high commendations have been awarded intermittently. Kim Wilkins has won the award three times, while four people have won the award twice - Trent Jamieson, Kirstyn McDermott, Ben Pienaar, and Kaaron Warren. Wilkins holds the record for most nominations, with five. Deborah Sheldon has the record for most nominations without winning, having been nominated four times.

== Winners and nominees ==
In the following table, the years correspond to the year of the book's eligibility; the ceremonies are always held the following year. Each year links to the corresponding "year in literature" article. Entries with a yellow background have won the award; those without a background are the nominees on the short-list.

* Winners and joint winners
* Nominees on the shortlist

Year	Author	Novel	Publisher	Ref
1995	Terry Dowling*	An Intimate Knowledge of the Night	Aphelion Publications	
1995	Venero Armanno	My Beautiful Friend	Arrow Books	
1995	Carmel Bird	The White Garden	UQP	
1995	David Brooks	The House of Balthus	Allen & Unwin	
1995	Justine Ettler	The River Ophelia	Picador	
1996	No award given			
1997	Kim Wilkins*	The Infernal	Random House	
1997	Stephen Dedman	The Art of Arrow Cutting	Tor Books	
1997	Richard Harland	The Dark Edge	Pan Macmillan	
1997	Emma Tom	Dead Set	Random House	
1998	No award given			
1999	Christine Harris*	Foreign Devil	Random House	
1999	Victor Kelleher	Into the Dark	Viking Press	
1999	Victor Kelleher	The Ivory Trail	Viking Press	
1999	P. Scot-Bernard	Deadly Sister Love	HarperCollins	
2000	Kim Wilkins*	The Resurrectionists	Voyager Books	
2000	Terry Dowling	Blackwater Days	Eidolon Publications	
2001	Kim Wilkins*	Angel of Ruin	Voyager Books	
2001	Cameron Rogers	The Music of Razors	Penguin Books	
2002	A. L. McCann*	The White Body of Evening	Flamingo	
2002	Alison Croggon	The Gift	Penguin Books	
2002	Louise Cusack	Daughter of the Dark	Simon & Schuster	
2002	Stephen Dedman	Shadows Bite	Tor Books	
2003	Victor Kelleher*	Born of the Sea	Viking Press	
2003	Anthony O'Neill	The Lamplighter	HarperCollins	
2003	Kim Wilkins	The Autumn Castle	Voyager Books	
2004	Richard Harland*	The Black Crusade	Chimaera Publications	
2004	Josephine Pennicott	Fire in the Shell	Simon & Schuster	
2004	Kim Wilkins	Giants of the Frost	Voyager Books	
2005	No award given			
2006	Will Elliott*	The Pilo Family Circus	ABC Books	
2006	Edwina Grey*	Prismatic	Lothian Books	
2006	Martin Livings	Carnies	Lothian Books	
2006	Brett McBean	The Mother	Lothian Books	
2007	Susan Parisi*	Blood of Dreams	Viking Press	
2007	Uncontested			
2008	John Harwood*	The Seance	Jonathan Cape	
2008	Jack Dann	The Economy of Light	PS Publishing	
2008	Nick Gadd	Ghostlines	Scribe Publications	
2009	Honey Brown*	Red Queen	Penguin Books	
2009	Peter Ball	Horn	Twelfth Planet Press	
2009	Stephen M. Irwin	The Dead Path	Hachette	
2009	Tracey O'Hara	Night's Cold Kiss	HarperCollins	
2009	Kaaron Warren	Slights	Angry Robot Books	
2010	Kirstyn McDermott*	Madigan Mine	Pan MacMillan	
2010	Jason Fischer	After the World: Gravesend	Black House Comics	
2010	Trent Jamieson	Death Most Definite	Orbit Books	
2011	No award given			
2011	Stephen M. Irwin	The Broken Ones	Hachette	
2011	Trent Jamieson	The Business of Death	Hachette	
2012	Kirstyn McDermott*	Perfections	Xoum	
2012	Jason Franks	Bloody Waters	Possible Press	
2012	Jason Nahrung	Blood and Dust	Xoum	
2012	Jason Nahrung	Salvage	Twelfth Planet Press	
2013	Allyse Near*	Fairytales for Wilde Girls	Random House Australia	
2013	Lee Battersby	The Marching Dead	Angry Robot Books	
2013	Greig Beck	The First Bird	Momentum	
2013	Dirk Flinthart	Path Of Night	FableCroft Publishing	
2014	Justine Larbalestier*	Razorhurst	Allen & Unwin	
2014	Alan Baxter	Obsidian	HarperVoyager	
2014	Greig Beck	Book of the Dead	Momentum	
2015	Trent Jamieson*	Day Boy	Text Publishing	
2015	Uncontested			
2016	Kaaron Warren*	The Grief Hole	IFWG Publishing Australia	
2016	Kenneth Cook	Fear is the Rider	Text Publishing	
2016	Justine Larbalestier	My Sister Rosa	Allen & Unwin	
2017	Lois Murphy*	Soon	Transit Lounge	
2017	J. S. Breukelaar	Aletheia	Crystal Lake Publishing	
2017	Maria Lewis	Who's Afraid Too?	Hachette Australia	
2018	Kaaron Warren*	Tide of Stone	Omnium Gatherum	
2018	Shirley Barrett	The Bus on Thursday	Allen & Unwin	
2018	Criag Cormick	Years of the Wolf	IFWG Publishing Australia	
2019	Andrew McGahan*	The Rich Man's House	Allen & Unwin	
2019	Brian Craddock	Chuwa: The Rat-People of Lahore	Broken Puppet Books	
2019	Andrew Cull	Remains	IFWG Publishing Australia	
2019	Simon Haynes	A Riddle in Bronze	Bowman Press	
2019	Deborah Sheldon	Body Farm Z	Severed Press	
2020	Ellie Marney*	None Shall Sleep	Allen & Unwin	
2020	Daniel de Lorne	Soul Survivor	Scarlo Media	
2020	Simon Haynes	An Enigma in Silver	Bowman Press	
2020	Claire McKenna	Monstrous Heart	HarperVoyager	
2020	Marty Young	Gutterbreed	Eclectic Trio Press	
2021	Ben Pienaar*	Holly and the Nobodies	HellBound Books Publishing	
2021	J. S. Breukelaar	The Bridge	Meerkat Press	
2021	Matthew R. Davis	Midnight in the Chapel of Love	JournalStone	
2021	Jason Fischer	Papa Lucy & The Boneman	Outland Entertainment	
2021	Jennifer Mills	The Airways	Picador Australia	
2022	Trent Jamieson*	The Stone Road	Erewhon	
2022	Alan Baxter	Sallow Bend	Cemetery Dance	
2022	Robert Hood	Scavengers	Clan Destine Press	
2022	Kathryn Hore	The Stranger	Allen & Unwin	
2022	Angela Slatter	Path of Thorns	Titan	
2023	S. E Tolsen*	Bunny	Pan Macmillan Australia	
2023	Graham Akhurst	Borderland	UWA Publishing	
2023	Katya de Becerra	When Ghosts Call Us Home	Macmillan	
2023	Maria Lewis	The Graveyard Shift	Datura Books	
2023	Ellie Marney	Some Shall Break	Allen & Unwin	
2023	Deborah Sheldon	Cretaceous Canyon	Severed	
2024	Ben Pienaar*	Carve Your Soul to Pieces	(self-published)	
2024	J. S. Breukelaar	Remedy	PS Publishing	
2024	A. B. Finlayson	Rock Zombie	(self-published)	
2024	David-Jack Fletcher	The Count	Slashic Horror Press	
2024	Josh Kemp	Jasper Cliff	Fremantle Press	
2024	Deborah Sheldon	Bodily Harm	Undertaker Books	
2025	Chris Flynn	Orpheus Nine	Hachette	
2025	Jessica Mansour-Nahra	The Farm	Hachette	
2025	Margot McGovern	This Stays Between Us	Penguin	
2025	A. Rushby	Slashed Beauties	HQ Fiction	
2025	Deborah Sheldon	Nightmare Reef	Severed Press	
2025	A. G. Slatter	The Crimson Road	Tita	

I Publisher names in parentheses indicate the imprint under which the book was published.

== Honourable mentions and high commendations ==
In the following table, the years correspond to the year of the book's eligibility; the ceremonies are always held the following year. Each year links to the corresponding "year in literature" article. Entries with a grey background have been noted as highly commended; those without a background have received honourable mentions.

* Highly commended
* Honourable mentions

Year	Author(s)	Novel	Publisher	Ref
2005	J. C. Burke*	Nine Letters Long	Random House	
2007	Keri Arthur	Dangerous Games	Piatkus	
2007	David Conyers & John Sunseri	The Spiraling Worm	Chaosium	
2007	Jason Nahrung	The Darkness Within	Hachette Livre	
2011	Stephen M. Irwin	The Broken Ones	Hachette	
2011	Trent Jamieson	The Business of Death	Hachette	

== See also ==
- Ditmar Award, an Australian science fiction award established in 1969
