= 2001 in Australian literature =

This article presents a list of the historical events and publications of Australian literature during 2001.

== Major publications ==
=== Literary fiction ===
- Geraldine Brooks – Year of Wonders
- Marshall Browne – The Trumpeting Angel
- Steven Carroll – The Art of the Engine Driver
- Bryce Courtenay – Four Fires
- Robert Dessaix – Corfu: A Novel
- Garry Disher – Past the Headlands
- Richard Flanagan – Gould's Book of Fish: A Novel in Twelve Fish
- Stephen Gray – The Artist is a Thief
- Marion Halligan – The Fog Garden
- Elizabeth Jolley – An Innocent Gentleman
- Kathy Lette – Nip 'n' Tuck
- Joan London – Gilgamesh
- John A. Scott – The Architect
- Tim Winton – Dirt Music
- Arnold Zable – Cafe Scheherazade

=== Children's and Young Adult fiction ===
- Graeme Base – The Waterhole
- Gary Crew – Gothic Hospital
- Garry Disher – Moondyne Kate
- Andy Griffiths – The Day My Bum Went Psycho
- Sonya Hartnett – Forest
- Odo Hirsch – Have Courage, Hazel Green!
- Leigh Hobbs – Horrible Harriet
- Maureen McCarthy – Flash Jack
- Garth Nix
  - Above the Veil
  - Lirael
- Emily Rodda – City of Rats
- Shaun Tan – The Red Tree
- Margaret Wild – Jinx
- Markus Zusak – When Dogs Cry

=== Crime and mystery ===
- Bunty Avieson – Apartment 255
- Marshall Browne – Inspector Anders and the Ship of Fools
- Lindy Cameron – Bleeding Hearts
- Jon Cleary – Yesterday's Shadow
- Peter Corris – Lugarno
- Emma Darcy – Who Killed Angelique?
- Peter Doyle – The Devil's Jump
- Kerry Greenwood – Away with the Fairies
- Gabrielle Lord – Death Delights
- Carolyn Morwood – A Simple Death
- Matthew Reilly – Area 7
- Patricia Shaw – The Dream Seekers

=== Romance ===
- Lilian Darcy – The Paramedic's Secret
- Barbara Hannay
  - The Pregnancy Discovery
  - The Wedding Dare

=== Science Fiction and Fantasy ===
- Trudi Canavan – The Magicians' Guild
- Cecilia Dart-Thornton – The Ill-Made Mute
- Sara Douglass – The Wounded Hawk
- Greg Egan – Schild's Ladder
- Jennifer Fallon
  - Harshini
  - Treason Keep
- Kate Forsyth – The Skull of the World
- Ian Irvine – Geomancer
- Fiona McIntosh – Betrayal
- Sean McMullen – Eyes of the Calculor
- Juliet Marillier – Child of the Prophecy
- Kim Wilkins – Angel of Ruin
- Sean Williams
  - The Dark Imbalance with Shane Dix
  - The Stone Mage and the Sea

=== Drama ===
- Andrew Bovell – Holy Day
- David Brown – Keep Everything You Love
- Nick Enright – Spurboard
- Dorothy Hewett – Nowhere
- Peta Murray – Salt : A Play in Five Helpings
- Joanna Murray-Smith – Bombshells
- John Romeril – Miss Tanaka
- David Williamson
  - Charitable Intent
  - A Conversation
  - Up for Grabs

=== Poetry ===
- M. T. C. Cronin – Bestseller
- John Forbes – Collected Poems : 1970–1998
- Peter Goldsworthy – New Selected Poems
- Dorothy Hewett – Halfway Up the Mountain
- John Kinsella – The Hierarchy of Sheep
- Peter Porter – Max is Missing
- Chris Wallace-Crabbe – By and Large
- Alan Wearne – The Lovemakers

=== Biographies ===
- Peter Carey – 30 Days in Sydney : A Wildly Distorted Account
- Dawn Fraser – Dawn: One Hell of a Life
- Jacqueline Kent – A Certain Style: Beatrice Davis, a Literary Life
- John Kinsella – Auto
- Roger McDonald – The Tree in Changing Light
- Hilary McPhee – Other People's Words
- Peter Rose – Rose Boys
- Nadia Wheatley – The Life and Myth of Charmian Clift

=== Non-Fiction ===
- Diane Armstrong – The Voyage of Their Life : The Story of the SS Derna and its Passengers
- Jill Jolliffe – Cover-Up: The Inside Story of the Balibo Five

== Awards and honours ==
Note: these awards were presented in the year in question.

=== Lifetime achievement ===
Award	Author
Christopher Brennan Award	Dorothy Porter
Patrick White Award	Geoff Page

=== Literary ===
Award	Author	Title	Publisher
The Age Book of the Year Award	Rosemary Dobson	Untold Lives and Later Poems	Brandl and Schlesinger
ALS Gold Medal	Rodney Hall	The Day We Had Hitler Home	Picador
Colin Roderick Award	Peter Rose	Rose Boys	Allen & Unwin
Nita Kibble Literary Award	Inga Clendinnen	Tiger's Eye: A Memoir	Text Publishing

=== Fiction ===
==== International ====
Award	Category	Author	Title	Publisher
Commonwealth Writers' Prize	Best Novel, SE Asia and South Pacific region	Peter Carey	True History of the Kelly Gang	University of Queensland Press
Commonwealth Writers' Prize	Best First Novel, SE Asia and South Pacific region	Arabella Edge	The Company	Picador
Commonwealth Writers' Prize	Overall winner	Peter Carey	True History of the Kelly Gang	University of Queensland Press
Man Booker Prize		Peter Carey	True History of the Kelly Gang	Faber & Faber

==== National ====
Award	Author	Title	Publisher
Adelaide Festival Awards for Literature	Not awarded		
The Age Book of the Year Award	Peter Carey	True History of the Kelly Gang	University of Queensland Press
The Australian/Vogel Literary Award	Sarah Hay	Skins	Allen & Unwin
The Australian/Vogel Literary Award	Catherine Padmore	Sibyl's Cave	Allen & Unwin
Miles Franklin Award	Frank Moorhouse	Dark Palace	Knopf
New South Wales Premier's Literary Awards	Alex Miller	Conditions of Faith	Allen & Unwin
Queensland Premier's Literary Awards	Peter Carey	True History of the Kelly Gang	University of Queensland Press
Victorian Premier's Literary Award	Peter Carey	True History of the Kelly Gang	University of Queensland Press
Western Australian Premier's Book Awards	Tim Winton	Dirt Music	Picador

=== Children and Young Adult ===
==== National ====
Award	Category	Author	Title	Publisher
Children's Book of the Year Award	Older Readers	Judith Clarke	Wolf on the Fold	Allen & Unwin
Children's Book of the Year Award	Younger Readers	Diana Kidd	Two Hands Together	Penguin Books
Children's Book of the Year Award	Picture Book	Margaret Wild, illus. Ron Brooks	Fox	Allen & Unwin
Children's Book of the Year Award	Early Childhood	Catherine Jinks, illus. Andrew McLean	You'll Wake the Baby!	Penguin Books
New South Wales Premier's Literary Awards	Children's	Margaret Wild, illus. Ron Brooks	Fox	Allen & Unwin
New South Wales Premier's Literary Awards	Young People's	Jaclyn Moriarty	Feeling Sorry for Celia	Pan Macmillan Australia
Queensland Premier's Literary Awards	Children's	Margaret Wild, illus. Ron Brooks	Fox	Allen & Unwin
Victorian Premier's Literary Award	Young Adult Fiction	James Moloney	Touch Me	University of Queensland Press
Western Australian Premier's Book Awards	Writing for Young Adults	Julia Lawrinson	Obsession	Fremantle Arts Centre
Western Australian Premier's Book Awards	Children's	Deborah Lisson	The Yankee Whaler	Scholastic

=== Crime and Mystery ===
==== National ====
Award	Category	Author	Title	Publisher
Davitt Award	Novel	Caroline Shaw	Eye to Eye	Random House Australia
Ned Kelly Award	Novel	Peter Temple	Dead Point	Bantam Books
Ned Kelly Award	Novel	Andrew Masterson	The Second Coming	Flamingo
Ned Kelly Award	First novel	Andrew McGahan	Last Drinks	Allen and Unwin
Ned Kelly Award	True crime	Estelle Blackburn	Broken Lives	Stellar Publishing
Ned Kelly Award	Readers' vote	Lindsay Cameron	Bleeding Hearts	HarperCollins
Ned Kelly Award	Lifetime achievement	Professor Stephen Knight		

=== Science fiction ===
Award	Category	Author	Title	Publisher
Aurealis Award	Sf Novel	Sean Williams & Shane Dix	The Dark Imbalance	Voyager Books
Aurealis Award	Sf Short Story	Adam Browne	"The Weatherboard Spaceship"	Aurealis
Aurealis Award	Fantasy Novel	Sara Douglass	The Wounded Hawk	Voyager Books
Aurealis Award	Fantasy Short Story	Sue Isle	"The Woman of Endor"	Orb
Aurealis Award	Horror Novel	Kim Wilkins	Angel of Ruin	Voyager Books
Aurealis Award	Horror Short Story	Simon Haynes	"Sleight of Hand"	Potato Monkey
Aurealis Award	Young Adult Novel	Louise Katz	The Other Face of Janus	Angus & Robertson
Ditmar Award	Novel	Sean Williams & Shane Dix	Evergence 2: The Dying Light	Ace Books
Ditmar Award	Short Fiction	Stephen Dedman	"The Devotee"	Eidolon 29/30
Ditmar Award	Short Fiction	Terry Dowling	"The Saltimbanques"	Blackwater Days

=== Poetry ===
Award	Author	Title	Publisher
Adelaide Festival Awards for Literature	Not awarded		
The Age Book of the Year	Rosemary Dobson	Untold Lives & Later Poems	Brandl and Schlesinger
Anne Elder Award	Not awarded		
Grace Leven Prize for Poetry	Geoff Page	Darker and Lighter	Five Islands Press
Mary Gilmore Award	Not awarded		
New South Wales Premier's Literary Awards	Ken Taylor	Africa	Five Islands Press
Queensland Premier's Literary Awards	Brook Emery	and dug my fingers in the sand	Five Islands Press
Victorian Premier's Literary Award	John Mateer	Barefoot Speech	Fremantle Press
Western Australian Premier's Book Awards	Dorothy Hewett	Halfway up the Mountain	Fremantle Arts Centre Press

=== Drama ===
Award	Author	Title	Publisher
Patrick White Playwrights' Award	Brendan Cowell	Bed	
Patrick White Playwrights' Award	Toby Schmitz	Lucky	
Patrick White Playwrights' Award	Jackie Smith	The Aliens	

=== Non-Fiction ===
Award	Category	Author	Title	Publisher
Adelaide Festival Awards for Literature	Non-Fiction	Not awarded		
The Age Book of the Year	Non-Fiction	Nadia Wheatley	The Life and Myth of Charmian Clift	HarperCollins
National Biography Award	Biography	Not awarded		
New South Wales Premier's Literary Awards	Non-Fiction	Kim Mahood	Craft for a Dry Lake	Random House Australia
New South Wales Premier's History Awards	Australian History	Tim Bonyhady	The Colonial Earth	Miegunyah Press at Melbourne University Publishing
New South Wales Premier's History Awards	Community and Regional History	Carolyn Wadley Dowley	Through Silent Country	Fremantle Arts Centre Press
New South Wales Premier's History Awards	General History	Rowena Lennox	Fighting Spirit of East Timor: The Life of Martinho da Costa Lopes	Pluto Press Australia
New South Wales Premier's History Awards	Young People's	No award		
Queensland Premier's Literary Awards	Non-fiction	Brian Matthews	A Fine and Private Place	Picador
Queensland Premier's Literary Awards	History	Tim Bonyhady	The Colonial Earth	Miegunyah Press
Victorian Premier's Literary Award	Non-fiction	Anna Haebich	Broken Circles: Fragmenting Indigenous Families 1800–2000	Fremantle Press

== Deaths ==
- 25 February – Don Bradman, cricketer and author (born 1908)
- 18 September – Amy Witting, novelist (born 1918)
- 20 September – Patsy Adam-Smith, writer (born 1924)
- 10 October – Helen Asher, novelist, left bequest for Asher Award (born 1927 in Germany)

Unknown date

- Peter Bladen, poet (born 1922)

== See also ==
- 2001 in Australia
- 2001 in literature
- 2001 in poetry
- List of years in literature
- List of years in Australian literature
