= The Autumn Castle =

Book by Kim Wilkins

- First edition
- Author: Kim Wilkins
- Language: English
- Genre: Fantasy, horror
- Publisher: Voyager
- Publication date: April 2003
- Publication place: Australia
- Media type: Print (hardback & paperback)
- Pages: 463 pp
- ISBN: 0-7322-7394-3

The Autumn Castle is a 2003 horror/fantasy novel by Kim Wilkins. It follows the story of Christine Starlight who has strong memories of her childhood friend, Mayfridh. Mayfridh was then abducted by the king and queen of a Germanic fairyland and is now on the throne of the Autumn Castle. Now the human and fairy worlds have joined with Mayfridh falling in love with Christine's partner and Christine venturing to the fairy world.

== Background ==
The Autumn Castle was first published in Australia in April 2003 by Voyager in trade paperback format. It was released in the United Kingdom and the United States in both hardback and paperback formats in 2004 and 2005. It was re-released in Australis in mass market paperback in 2004 and then as an audio edition in 2005 by Bolinda Publishing. The Autumn Castle was a short-list nominee for the 2003 Aurealis Award for best horror novel but lost to Victor Kelleher's Born of the Sea.
