= The Gift (Croggon novel) =

2002 novel by Alison Croggon

The Naming
- Australian cover of The Gift
- Author: Alison Croggon
- Language: English
- Series: Pellinor
- Genre: Fantasy
- Publisher: Penguin Books
- Publication date: 1 October 2002 (Australia)
- Publication place: Australia
- Media type: Print (hardback & paperback)
- Pages: 480 (1st Australian edition)
- ISBN: 0-14-029343-4
- OCLC: 52686531
- Followed by: The Riddle

The Gift (a.k.a. The Naming) is 2002 fantasy novel by Alison Croggon. It is the first in her Pellinor quartet.

== Background ==
The Gift was first published in Australia on 1 October 2002 by Penguin Books in trade paperback format. In 2004 it was released in the United Kingdom by Walker Books and in 2005 it was released under the title of The Naming in hardback format by Candlewick Press in the United States. The Gift was a short-list nominee in both the 2002 Aurealis Award for best fantasy novel and the best horror novel but lost to Sean Williams' The Storm Weaver and the Sand and A. L. McCann's The White Body of Evening respectively.

== Plot summary ==
The Gift (also published as The Naming) begins with Maerad, in "Gilman's Cot" as a slave, where she has been for many years, with few memories of her former life, her mother having died several years before. She is discovered by Cadvan, one of the great mystics known as 'Bards', who reveals to her that she, like him, possesses "the Gift" shared by all of these, by which she is able to command nature to do her will. Cadvan soon discovers that her mother was the leader of the First Circle of the destroyed School of Pellinor, of whom it was previously assumed that there were no survivors. Knowing this, Cadvan decides to help her escape, believing that it might not be by means of random chance that he came upon the only known survivor of Pellinor.

When Cadvan finds that Maerad's Gift is unusually powerful for one never formally taught, he begins to suspect of her more significance than he had before. He takes her to the School of Innail, to make the presence of a survivor from Pellinor known and to make Maerad a Minor Bard of Pellinor. During their time there, Maerad obtains knowledge of a long-forgotten prophecy concerning the 'Foretold One' who will defeat the Nameless One. This Nameless One is a corrupt political leader, formerly called Sharma, who discarded his own true name in order to become immortal. Twice has he attempted to conquer the land of Edil-Amarandh, and he has twice been vanquished. His last bid for power is the one in which the Foretold One, Elednor, will defeat him, leaving him dead or helpless forever. Maerad's own history, being coincident with that of the Foretold One, implies that she is Elednor, although Maerad does not immediately embrace the idea.

After their brief but enjoyed stay at Innail, Cadvan takes Maerad across the country of Annar to the school of Norloch, intending to have her instated as a full Bard and given her Name, and also to see his old teacher Nelac. En route, they discover that the Nameless One's corrupt Bards, the Hulls, are roaming freely, so that non-users of magic are terrified and terrorized; that Maerad is descended on her mother Milana's side from Lady Ardina, a faerie creature, in the book called an Elidhu, who still lives in the forest as monarch of a Lothlórien-like settlement; and that Maerad has a younger brother, called Hem or Cai, who like her is an inheritor of the Gift.

When Maerad and Cadvan, who has become her tutor, reach Norloch, they discover that corruption has penetrated even here, in that the First Bard Enkir has fallen under Sharma's influence. He is revealed as the one who had Pellinor destroyed and who sold Maerad into slavery. Largely as a result of this, and partly on account of his own misogyny, Enkir refuses to admit that Maerad is the Foretold One, or even to let her be instated as a Bard. Therefore, Cadvan and Nelac invoke an archaic ritual called the Way of the White Flame, by which Maerad is anointed a full Bard. Her Name, at this point, is revealed to be that of the Foretold One; Elednor, which means "Fire Lily".

Driven out by their enemy's hostility, Cadvan and Maerad flee to the island of Thorold, while Hem is sent southward for safety with Saliman, one of Cadvan's childhood friend who was also taught by Nelac.
