= The Ivory Trail =

Book by Victor Kelleher

- First edition
- Author: Victor Kelleher
- Cover artist: Garry Moore
- Language: English
- Genre: Young adult, Horror
- Publisher: Viking Press
- Publication date: 1999
- Publication place: Australia
- Media type: Print (Paperback)
- Pages: 213 pp (first edition)
- ISBN: 0-670-88845-1

The Ivory Trail is a 1999 young adult horror novel by Victor Kelleher. It follows the story of Jamie Hassan who is coming of age in a traditional mysticism bohemian family. He has a talent he does not want; reliving the lives of the long dead. After receiving an ivory carving he is sent on journeys through time in order to find his spiritual guide to succeed in his journey, to reach his mysterious goal and to meet an equally mysterious stranger at the end of it all.

== Background ==
The Ivory Trail was first published in Australia in 1996 by Viking Press in trade paperback format. In 2001 it was published in the United Kingdom by Puffin Books. Its front cover is used in Australia as a visual text in the New South Wales English Stage 6 Syllabus Journeys Stimulus Booklet. The Ivory Trail was a short-list nominee for the 1999 Aurealis Award for best young-adult novel and best horror novel but lost to Dave Luckett's A Dark Victory and Christine Harris' Foreign Devil respectively.
