= The Singing =

2008 novel by Alison Croggon

- First edition
- Author: Alison Croggon
- Language: English
- Series: Pellinor
- Genre: Fantasy
- Publisher: Penguin Books
- Publication date: 30 June 2008 (Australia); 1 September 2008 (UK); 10 March 2009 (US)
- Publication place: Australia
- Media type: Print
- Pages: 470
- Preceded by: The Crow

The Singing is the fourth and last novel in Alison Croggon's Pellinor series. The novel was completed in June 2007 and was published in Australia on 30 June 2008.

== Plot ==
Maerad and Cadvan have returned to Innail. Maerad has realised that she has been carrying the runes of the Treesong (the magical, ancient song through which it is believed the Speech came into being) with her the whole time - on her lyre. Maerad believes it is imperative that she find her brother soon, as she senses he has a part to play in the Treesong as well. After spending time resting and catching up with old friends they attempt to leave, only to be forced back to discover themselves in a besieged Innail. It is supposed to be the doing of the Landrost, a minor elidhu who is collaborating with Sharma/the Nameless One. None of the occupants are able to leave because of an unnatural snowstorm that brings extreme and fatal cold. Maerad is able to locate the Landrost's attacks, and the bards of Innail are able to hold it back. After witnessing much destruction and facing near-death, Maerad merges into her Elidhu being to destroy the Landrost She is able to strip the Landrost to almost nothing. She is saved by a combination of Arkan, the Winterking, taunting her, and Cadvan calling her her Truename, Elednor. Maerad is now also known as 'the Maid of Innail' and is bedridden for many days.

Meanwhile, Hem, Maerad's 13-year-old brother is traveling with his caretaker, Saliman of Turbansk and Soron of Til Amon. Hem too feels the need to get to Maerad. He now knows the significance of the tuning fork Irc (Hem's pet white crow, with whom he can converse in the Speech) stolen from Sharma's tower - the runes it is decorated with are the second half of the Treesong, to match Maerad's lyre. Hem is still mourning the death of Zelika, a friend of his. All party members are anxious to get to Til Amon, Soron's home school. Along the way they meet up with a trio of traveling players named Karim, Marich, and Hekibel, who are unaware of the advancing Black (Sharma's) Army and to warn them about the same. Upon arriving at Til Amon, Hem falls seriously ill, but recovers very quickly. Til Amon prepares to defend themselves against the Black Army, which they believe will arrive shortly. Later, the traveling players show up, hoping to make a quick profit before moving on. Saliman decides that it would not serve Hem and his purposes to be trapped in Til Amon during a siege, so they decide to accompany the players when they leave.

When traveling with the players, after a performance, Hem sees Karim speaking to a black-clad figure he believes to be a Hull. Hem has dreams of Maerad, which assure him she is still alive, and that he is meant to find her. Shortly, the group encounters flash floods and must take shelter in a seemingly abandoned inn. Saliman is attacked by a quite mad victim of the White Sickness (a disease brewed by the Dark). Saliman manages to subdue the man, but gets infected as well. Marich, Karim and a slightly reluctant Hekibel decide to abandon Saliman and continue on in fear of falling ill. Hem refuses to leave, despite Saliman's pleas and stays with him. Hem is devastated as only the greatest healer-bards know how to cure the White Sickness. Hem refuses to let Saliman die and tries to heal him himself, with the help of Saliman's Truename. He succeeds, proving he has considerable healing skill.

On her own path, Maerad and Cadvan finally manage to leave Innail and are caught by the floods themselves. Maerad ponders the meaning of a song the elidhu Ardina sang her the first time they met. Cadvan shares fear that if the Treesong is made whole, the Bard's Speech may lose its power. Maerad expresses a wish to open all of her abilities, including the ones she fears are Dark. She succeeds and learns Hem's Truename and summons him to her.

Hekibel returns to where she left Hem and Saliman, bringing news that Marich and Karim are both dead, and Karim was indeed dealing with Hulls. They allow her to travel with them, after she expresses remorse for leaving them behind. They follow Maerad's summoning which is felt by Hem and eventually they meet up with Maerad and Cadvan. The united group is attacked by Hulls, which Maerad uses her power to destroy. Due to her new powers, Maerad becomes prey to the sights of the dead, as they near the site of an ancient but now destroyed citadel of the Light, Afinil.

There is the sight of the Black Army marching up to Lirigon. A desperate Cadvan bids Irc to go and warn the people of the Army. As they finally reach the site of Afinil, Maerad has a brief mental encounter with Sharma. Then she and Hem join their musical objects and Maerad begins to sing the Treesong finally, destroying Sharma once and for all.

After the Singing, it is shown that Maerad and Cadvan along with the rest of their friends return to the haven of Innail. Maerad is set to have lost her elemental self in the Singing, and it is shown that Maerad and Cadvan are a couple now, besides Saliman and Hekibel. Also, Lirigon was alerted and saved well in time, thanks to Irc and Hem is invited upon by Nelac (Cadvan and Saliman's teacher) to learn the art of Healing from him. The book ends with Maerad contemplating what to do next with her life, with Cadvan offering to take her to Lirigon and with the usual of Alison's historical appendices.
