= The Riddler (disambiguation) =

The Riddler is a DC comics supervillain introduced in 1948.

The Riddler may also refer to:

== Geography ==
- The Riddler (Idaho), a mountain

== Music ==
- The Riddler aka DJ Riddler an American dance DJ
- "The Riddler", a single by Frank Gorshin composed by Mel Tormé 1966 for the original Batman TV series
- The Riddler (song) by Method Man for the 1995 Batman film
- "The Riddler" by Nightwish from Oceanborn and Best of Nightwish
- "The Riddler" by Felix Cartal The Joker
- "The Riddler" by Elephant9 / Reine Fiske

== See also ==
- The Riddle (disambiguation)
