= The Cautious Traveller's Guide to the Wastelands =

Historical fantasy novel by Sarah Brooks

The Cautious Traveller's Guide to the Wastelands is a 2024 historical fantasy novel by Sarah Brooks.

== Themes and analysis ==
Athena Heavey of the Historical Novel Society has argued that the novel ""delivers a vibrant critique of modernity, which questions what it means to be living in an age of ever-developing technological advancements." Laura Hackett of The Sunday Times wrote that the novel has "hints of Miltonic theology: a fallen Eden, the connections between all things."

Jess Gately of The AU Review argued that "the Wastelands is an obvious metaphor for change," with The Company representing capitalism, leading to a novel that explores "the inevitability of change and how we approach it as individuals" as well as "eco-activism and the forces both societally and personally that oppose change in that space." Ian Mond of Locus Magazine has argued that the novel contained "a somewhat nuanced story about class," saying that "the train changes in multiple ways, most notably the forming of a community, one that has little time for the Trans-Siberia Company and its owners. What I’m saying is that I didn’t expect the novel to take such a turn, to become what’s essentially a story about a socialist utopia."

== Reception ==
Writing in the Financial Times, James Lovegrove named the novel one of the best science fiction books of 2024, describing it as a "vivid, impressive debut."

Athena Heavey of the Historical Novel Society described the novel as "a tale rich with mystery and wonder" and a "captivating tale of a train journey through the fantastical and perilous wastelands." Jess Gately of The AU Review wrote that "everything about the way this book is written gives the reader a sense of the closeness in proximity in which all the characters exist, and squeezes you into the space to become another passenger on this dangerous and mysterious journey," saying that the novel was " truly a joy to read, and genuinely feels like you are embarking on an adventure. If complex characters in close proximity trying to hide their secrets from each other appeals to you, this book is sure to tickle your fancy." Ian Mond of Locus Magazine described the novel as "a journey well worth taking," with "elegant prose that’s never baroque but finds a particular sort of beauty in the strange and uncanny." Australian horror journalist Jason Nahrung wrote that "Brooks’ balance of character and setting makes her a fine guide as the story picks up steam, arriving dead on time for its fateful conclusion."

Laura Hackett of The Sunday Times wrote that "Brooks’s descriptions of the landscape are sensuous and enigmatic" and "brings together serious ideas, a convincing world and a fast-paced plot," while also saying that "the novel has its flaws: characterisation suffers as world-building triumphs; the one romantic relationship is devoid of chemistry; I got a strong whiff of Netflix adaptation-itis; and the final third of the book does admittedly get a bit silly. The ending felt like a get-out clause, which was disappointing after such a meticulous set-up."
