= Susan Parisi =

Canadian-Australian author

- Born: 1958 (age 67–68); Vancouver, British Columbia, Canada
- Writing career
- Genre: Horror fiction
- Notable awards: Aurealis Award; Horror division 2007 Blood of Dreams

Susan Parisi (born 1958) is a Canadian-Australian author of horror fiction. Her debut novel Blood of Dreams won the 2007 Aurealis Award for best horror novel.

== Biography ==
Susan Parisi was born in Vancouver, British Columbia in 1958. As a teenager, she moved to Australia with her family because her father was on the run from the law.

Parisi completed postgraduate studies in psychology and has been employed in occupational psychology and university administration.

Currently residing in Sydney, Parisi is married to an Italian-Australian man. She has a passion for Italian culture and frequently travels to Italy.

Parisi is a dual Canadian-Australian citizen.

== Works ==
In 2007, Parisi's debut novel Blood of Dreams was released by Viking. A murder-mystery set in 18th-century Venice during Carnevale, it involves a killer who stalks his victims' dreams and a woman who must confront her past in order to stop him.

Blood of Dreams was awarded the 2007 Aurealis Award for best horror novel and was a short-list nominee for the 2008 Arthur Ellis Award for best first novel.

Parisi is working her second novel Mosaic, a conspiracy-thriller set in Rome and Palermo.

== Bibliography ==
- Blood of Dreams (2007)
