= The Crow (novel) =

Book by Alison Croggon

- First edition
- Author: Alison Croggon
- Series: Pellinor
- Genre: Fantasy
- Publisher: Penguin Books
- Publication date: 1 May 2006 (Australia)
- Publication place: Australia
- Media type: Print (paperback)
- Pages: 504 (1st Australian edition)
- ISBN: 0-14-300214-7 (paperback edition)
- OCLC: 70818848
- Preceded by: The Riddle
- Followed by: The Singing

The Crow is a 2006 fantasy novel by Australian author Alison Croggon. It is the third book of her Pellinor tetralogy.

== Plot introduction ==
The book is set in the fictional world of Edil-Amarandh. According to the author, this book is the third part of her translation of the 8-part book Naraudh Lar-Chanë (the "Riddle of the Treesong").

== Plot summary ==
While his sister, Maerad, was in the north in search of the Treesong, as told in The Riddle, Hem and his mentor Saliman arrive in Turbansk, the centre of the light in the Suderain, which is Saliman's School. There Hem becomes a Minor Bard, and has lessons with other Bards of Turbansk. Because he does not know the Suderain language, Hem finds it very hard to make friends. After a quarrel with one of his teachers, Hem escapes to a garden, where he rescues a white crow from the attack of several black crows. Hem names the crow Irc (the Pilani name for "bird"), and keeps him. A few days later, Turbansk receives news that the army of Sharma, the Nameless One, have destroyed cities and towns to the South, and are expected to attack Turbansk soon. The children are mostly evacuated from Turbansk. Under the request of Saliman, Hem stays at the School and works to heal those wounded in battle. One day while wandering around the nearly empty Turbansk, Hem meets an orphaned girl called Zelika, whose parents were killed by the dark army of the Nameless One. As Hem, Saliman, Zelika and Irc travel South to remain safe from the Black Army, they pass through an ancient underground city. There they stay and Hem and Zelika are trained as child spies. One day, when they are left alone, Hem finds a room with a mural of a tree-man. The tree-man is an Elidhu.

After Hem and Zelika are trained as spies, their mentor sends them out. At the nearest hideout yet to be discovered by Sharma's army, the Pit, they stop. While spying Zelika spots her brother and gives herself away.

Hem then spends months tailing Zelika, waiting to save her. When the chance came, he was already in the city where the Iron Tower was, and he found out that he had been tracking Zelika's brother all that time. As he ran away alone, Irc came back carrying a shiny thing. Irc helps him escape the city and tells him the story of how Irc came by the shiny thing.

They met up with Saliman later and Hem is told that Zelika never even set foot in the camp—they had found her body mauled in the woods and did the best they could to honor her death. Later, Hem goes to find the tree-man and asks him what the thing was, and the tree-man tells him it was part of the Treesong, and that he couldn't touch it. He says that Hem was part of the Treesong, and that he was the player. Then Saliman, Hem and Irc set off to find Maerad.

== Characters ==
Hem – Hem is Maerad's twelve-year-old brother, found in the middle of the desert by Maerad and her mentor, Cadvan. Hem and Saliman travelled South to stay safe, while Maerad and Cadvan travelled North to find the lost Treesong.

Zelika – after watching her whole family perish at the hands of the Black Army, Zelika seeks revenge and escapes to Turbansk, where she first meets Hem. She quickly comes to trust him, and becomes a part of his perilous adventures. It is speculated that Zelika and Hem might have loved one another, but their time together is cut short when she attempts to rescue her brother, Nisrah. Hem discovers only much later that Zelika was killed by a Hull before she even entered the camp. She came from the House of Il Aran, in Baladh, but after Baladh was taken by the Black Army she escaped to Turbansk and that was when Hem found her. Zelika is Hem's age.

== Critical reception ==
In The Age newspaper Cameron Woodhead noted: "The Pellinor series owes a large debt to Tolkien. Croggon is the kind of fantasy writer who wants you to see every blade of grass, and she has a highly immersive imagination. It might be derivative, but The Crow is ornate quest fantasy that fans of the genre will take to."

A reviewer in Booklist magazine commented: "Lengthy, detailed, and increasingly compelling, the book broadens readers' vision of this alternate world and sets the stage for the final conflict."

== See also ==
- 2006 in Australian literature
