= Chris Flynn (author) =

Australian author, editor and critic

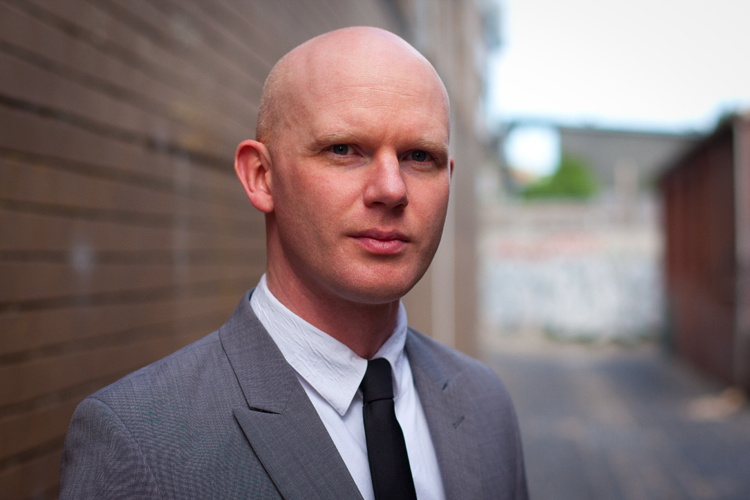
Chris Flynn

Chris Flynn (born 1972) is an Australian author, editor and critic.

== Bibliography ==
Flynn's first novel, A Tiger in Eden was released in Australia by Text Publishing in March 2012. It was shortlisted for the 2013 Commonwealth Book Prize. His second novel, The Glass Kingdom was released in May 2014 and his third, Mammoth, was published in March 2020.

McSweeney's issue 41, released July 2012, features a portfolio of fiction by Indigenous Australian writers, Terra Australis: Four Stories from Aboriginal Australian Writers, curated, edited and introduced by Flynn.

Flynn contributed to a regular column, Odd Jobs, on The Paris Review Daily, the blog of The Paris Review. He has written for the Griffith Review, The Age, The Australian, The Books and Arts Daily Show on Radio National, Meanjin, The Big Issue and many other publications.

Mammoth was shortlisted for Fiction Book of the Year at the 2021 Indie Book Awards. Here Be Leviathans won the 2022 Aurealis Award for Best Collection and was shortlisted for the Steele Rudd Award for a Short Story Collection at the 2023 Queensland Literary Awards.

Flynn's fourth novel, Orpheus Nine, won the 2025 Aurealis Award for Best Horror Novel.

== Personal life ==
Born in 1972 in Belfast, Northern Ireland, Flynn has resided in Melbourne, Australia since 1999.

== Works ==
=== Novels ===
- A Tiger in Eden (2012)
- The Glass Kingdom (2014)
- Mammoth (2020)
- Orpheus Nine (2025)

=== Short Story Collections ===
- Here Be Leviathans (2022)

=== Book reviews ===
- Flynn, Chris (June 2011). "[Untitled review]". Australian Book Review (332): 42.
  - Review of: Goldbloom, Goldie (2011). You lose these + other stories. Fremantle Press. ISBN 9781921696879.
