= The Seance (Harwood novel) =

2008 novel by John Harwood

- The Seance first edition cover.
- Author: John Harwood
- Language: English
- Genre: Horror
- Publisher: Jonathan Cape
- Publication date: 1 April 2008
- Publication place: Australia
- Media type: Print (Hardback & Paperback)
- Pages: 304 pp (first edition)
- ISBN: 978-0-224-08187-0

The Seance is a 2008 horror novel by John Harwood. Set in late 19th century London, it follows the story of Constance Langton who in an attempt to make her mother healthy again takes her to a séance only to result in tragic consequences. The Seance won the 2008 Aurealis Award for best horror novel.

The book was first published in Australia on 1 April 2008 by Jonathan Cape in trade paperback format. It was re-released in hardback and mass market paperback format in Australia during 2008 and 2009, and received a similar release in the United States and United Kingdom during this time. An audio edition was published in September 2008 by Oakhill Publishing Limited in the United Kingdom.

== Synopsis ==
Ever since her childhood Constance Langton has felt out of place. She never had a proper mother, as Constance's mother preferred to obsess over the death of Constance's infant sister Alma, to the point where this drove her to suicide many years later. To make matters worse, Constance seems to have the ability to see horrible visions of future deaths, which greatly unnerves her. In 1889 Constance discovers that she has inherited Wraxford Hall, a run down and supposedly haunted mansion in Suffolk. Despite warnings by the Wraxford family lawyer that the house has led to the death and disappearances of several Wraxfords - and that living there is not a good idea, Constance ends up drawn to the house, something that might spell her doom.

== Reception ==
The Seance received positive reviews from Tor.com and The Independent, the latter of which compared the book to the works of Wilkie Collins and Arthur Conan Doyle, writing that both authors were "fascinated by the disputed borderland between the claims of the paranormal and the techniques of Victorian science. In the hands of a lesser writer, these elements might have seemed stagey and trite. But Harwood reinvests them with novelty and makes them genuinely spooky." The Telegraph praised Harwood's writing, especially his "understanding of how two young women, Constance and Eleanor, are at the mercy of a society in which they have to fight for an economic stake, continually facing the anxieties of poverty and social banishment."

=== Awards ===
- Aurealis Award for best horror novel (2008, won)
