= The Infernal =

1997 novel by Kim Wilkins

- First edition
- Author: Kim Wilkins
- Cover artist: Yolande Gray
- Language: English
- Genre: Fantasy, horror
- Publisher: Random House
- Publication date: 1997
- Publication place: Australia
- Media type: Print (Paperback)
- Pages: 478 pp (first edition)
- ISBN: 978-0-09-183417-3

The Infernal is a 1997 horror/fantasy novel by Kim Wilkins. It follows the story of musician whose fans keep turning up dead and who is having memories that do not belong to her.

== Background ==
The Infernal was first published in Australia in 1997 by Random House in paperback. It was later released in Germany, United Kingdom and France in 1999 and 2002. The Infernal won the 1997 Aurealis Award for best fantasy novel and best horror novel. In 2010 a limited hardcover edition was published by Ticonderoga Publications.
