= Blood of Dreams =

2007 novel by Susan Parisi

- Blood of Dreams first edition cover.
- Author: Susan Parisi
- Language: English
- Genre: Horror, historical fiction
- Publisher: Viking Press
- Publication date: 2007
- Publication place: Australia
- Media type: Print (Paperback)
- Pages: 399 pp (first edition)
- ISBN: 978-0-670-07138-8
- OCLC: 174091929

Blood of Dreams is a 2007 debut historical fiction and horror novel by Susan Parisi. It follows the story of women who has the power to stop a killer as he stalks the dreams of his victims.

== Background ==
Blood of Dreams was first published in Australia in 2007 by Penguin Books under their Viking Press imprint in trade paperback format. In June 2008 it was republished in mass market paperback format. Blood of Dreams won the 2007 Aurealis Award for best horror novel and was a short-list nominee for the 2008 Arthur Ellis Award for best first novel but lost to Garcia's Heart by Liam Durcan.
