= The Riddle (novel) =

2004 fantasy novel by Alison Croggon

- Australian cover of The Riddle
- Author: Alison Croggon
- Language: English
- Series: Pellinor
- Genre: Fantasy
- Publisher: Penguin Books
- Publication date: 1 November 2004 (Australia)
- Publication place: Australia
- Media type: Print (paperback)
- Pages: 472 (1st Australian edition)
- ISBN: 0-14-300213-9
- OCLC: 156877803
- Preceded by: The Gift
- Followed by: The Crow

The Riddle is a 2004 fantasy novel by Alison Croggon. It is the second in her Pellinor tetralogy, continuing from The Gift.

== Overview ==
As with all books in the series, The Riddle purports to be a translation of the Naraudh Lar-Chanë (The Riddle of the Treesong) from the Annaren. It contains, as a result, linguistic and historical appendices and guides which describe the politics of Edil-Amarandh, aspects of the Elidhu, and the Treesong itself. It is stated, as in the text, that none of the Seven Kingdoms have ever been subject to Annaren rule, and provides a visual guide to the Treesong.

== Plot ==
Maerad and Cadvan continue the search for the Treesong, the key to Maerad's destiny, while fleeing from Enkir, the First Bard of Norloch, who had broken Milana, Maerad's mother, and sold them both into slavery. Maerad and Cadvan sail with a friend called Owan d'Aroki to the Mycenean Greece-like island of Thorold. Enkir sends a sea serpent in pursuit, which the two Bards kill. Having arrived on the island, they enter the Bardic School of Busk. Maerad continues her Bardic training that had been stopped abruptly in Innail, learning about imagery, illusions, and additional fighting skills, which improve readily. Cadvan studies records in Busk's extensive library, but finds nothing by which to explain the nature of the Treesong.

Soon, Busk receives a messenger from Norloch who reveals that Enkir has claimed the authority of High King over all the Seven Kingdoms, and demands the Schools' undivided fealty. Busk, rather than submit to Norloch or be counted its enemies, pledge their "unwavering allegiance to the Light", rather than to Enkir; thus placing themselves beyond either possibility. Later, at a seasonal festival commemorating the Bards' New Year, Busk's First Bard Nerili succumbs to a 'darkness' within herself, which puts her into a trauma that prevents her creation of the ceremonial "Tree of Light". Cadvan intervenes, salvaging the ceremony, but Nerili's experience suggests that the power of the evil Nameless One is increasing, and that it is more insidious than in his previous attacks upon humanity.

Maerad and Cadvan decide to leave the School of Busk, as it is not safe for them to stay, and instead travel a long and arduous route into the island's mountainous interior, accompanied by the Bard Elenxi. Elenxi guides the two to his goatherd brother Ankil, who is Nerili's grandfather. Maerad and Cadvan adapt to an agrarian lifestyle, continuing Maerad's training in their spare time. In so doing, they learn that Maerad is capable of feats of transformation beyond the abilities of any other Bard, as demonstrated when she literally changes a boulder into a lion. Such abilities are attributed to her Elidhu (faerie) ancestry. At one point, Ankil reveals a story wherein one mortal king stole a song of the world's harmony from the Elidhu, splitting it in half, and by doing so brought misery. Cadvan assumes this man to be Sharma, who would later become the Nameless One, but is subsequently suggested to be wrong.

When word reaches them that they are no longer safe, Maerad and Cadvan leave Ankil. Accompanied by Elenxi, they traverse an unfrequented path to a port where they may sail with Owan to the mainland. En route, they are attacked by a Hull (a sorcerer corrupted by evil magic), who renders Elenxi insensate and holds Maerad's power under his control by use of an appropriately named "blackstone", which copies her magic's energetic signature and enables him to manipulate it. In spite of this, Maerad uses her Elidhu power to change him into a rabbit. Cadvan thence captures and kills the rabbit, leaving him to corrode. Maerad and Cadvan then awaken Elenxi.

The two of them take leave of Elenxi at the coast of Thorold, from which they then embark for the mainland. While they are on the ocean, Cadvan, Maerad, and Owan are attacked by a monstrous "stormdog"; a huge, ferocious, wild manifestation of the storm's fury, shaped vaguely like an enormous hound. In attempting to use her magic against it in Cadvan's aid, Maerad suddenly understands the stormdog's true nature, and therefore calms it rather than frighten it away. Thereafter the three humans make the journey safely to land.

On the mainland, Cadvan and Maerad stay for some days and nights (possibly less than a week) at the Bardic School of Ghent. Here, Maerad's training is not pursued as it was on Thorold, but they are treated as honored guests. Maerad soon befriends their host Gahal's daughter Lyla, who while not a Bard has skill in the art of medicine. Because her now dead suitor Dernhil was born at Ghent, Maerad is often reminded of him.

Owan leaves for Thorold, which is his home; days later, Maerad and Cadvan go north on the backs of their faithful horses, Darsor and Imi. Believing such a course to be against Enkir's expectations, they ride through Annar, briefly passing within reach of Cadvan's former School, Lirigon. In Annar, they encounter economic degradation, often openly in the forms of abject poverty, misery, and child labour. Near Lirigon, they encounter two Bards who believe Enkir's statement that any who do not swear fealty to him, and especially Cadvan and Maerad, are traitors to the Light. In the confrontation, Maerad kills one of these two Bards, Ilar of Desor. This act deeply disturbs Cadvan, who takes it as indication that he has failed to correctly train Maerad. When he speaks of this, Maerad's own emotional insecurity etc. causes her to be harsher toward Cadvan than she has been accustomed to be. Fear, pride, and resentment on her part increase over the next many weeks, causing a rift between herself and Cadvan.

The Bards and their horses proceed to the mountains called Osidh Elanor, intending to go beyond them to find the secret of the Treesong. When they are among the mountains, they are attacked by the frost giant-like iriduguls, who serve the Elidhu called Arkan the Winterking. Maerad cannot join with Cadvan mentally to combat these iriduguls, who break the mountainside and by doing so bury Cadvan and Darsor. Imi flees in the opposite direction, while Maerad, horrified at the sight of Cadvan's apparent death, lies down in shock.

When she awakens, Maerad eats, drinks, and plays a lament for those whom she considers dead on a flute-like instrument given to her by her Elidhu ancestor Queen Ardina. The playing of the pipes summons Ardina, who at Maerad's request heals some of her more life-threatening injuries, then takes her to the home of a northern tribeswoman called Mirka à Hadaruk, who lives as a recluse in the mountains with no companion but her dog Inka. Mirka nurses Maerad to health over several days, during which she reveals that she is a Bard, though not one trained in the Annaren/Thoroldian fashion; that she (Mirka) belongs to the seminomadic people called Pilani, from whom Maerad is descended on her father's side; and that to the north exist a people called the Wise Kindred, who may explain the Treesong.

Maerad, having recovered from her injuries and left Mirka, travels to Murask, a Pilani settlement on the nearby Zmarkan Plains. There, she is accepted as guest by her father Dorn's twin sister, Sirkana à Triberi. Maerad stays in Murask for some days, unremarked by most of the people whom she meets, and eventually leaves in the company of one Dharin, a cousin of hers born to Dorn's other sister. Dharin and Maerad ride on a dogsled to the home of the Wise Kindred, an Inuit-like ethnicity of people who live on the volcanic islands north of Zmarkan. These people, in turn, redirect Maerad to the home of the necromancer Inka-Reb, who lives with a pack of wolves.

Inka-Reb receives Maerad and calls her a liar when she claims to need his help to define and find the Treesong. Angered, she demands that he speak with her. He agrees, adding that she may be unaware of having spoken a lie. Inka-Reb then reveals that half of the divided Treesong is actually written on a lyre that Maerad has inherited from her mother, and that if either the Light or the Dark unite the two halves, the world will be ruined. Having told her this, and refusing to say more, he sends her away.

Maerad and Dharin ride their dogsled toward the south, but are attacked on the way to Murask by the Jussacks, a tribe of Cossack-like hunters sent by the Winterking to seize Maerad. Dharin is killed and Maerad taken prisoner. The Jussacks transport her in their own dogsleds to the northeastern stronghold where Arkan's life and power are situated, where they hand her to Arkan. En route Maerad develops a friendship with Nim, the Jussack warrior deputed to take care of her, and loses three fingers to frostbite, reducing her much-cherished ability to play music.

In Arkan's fortress, Maerad is given a life of illusory luxury, her corporeal needs attended by a servant woman named Gima, who views Arkan as her beloved master. Arkan and Maerad gradually develop a Beauty and the Beast-like relationship, wherein she feels sexually drawn to him and he to her. During her captivity, Arkan reads the writing on Maerad's lyre, revealing that the symbols are an ogham-analogous script containing the power of the Speech. He additionally reveals that they were created by the Bard Nelsor, who attempted to capture the Song's power without realizing the disasters this could cause. Nelsor is later suggested to have been Arkan's homosexual partner.

Maerad is contacted during her captivity by Ardina, who has changed herself into a wolf and does not initially reveal her own identity. She gives Maerad a saying: "Triple-tongued is triple-named". This implies that in addition to the girl's human name, Maerad, and her Bardic name Elednor, she has another, Elidhu name, which Arkan does not know and therefore cannot use to control her as he uses the others. Ultimately, Maerad walks out of Arkan's stronghold and joins Ardina, who guides her to assume wolf's form. As wolves, the two escape, pursued by Arkan's stormdogs.

Ardina delivers Maerad to the wolf pack who serve Inka-Reb and leaves her with them. Subsequently, the wolf pack take Maerad to Annar, where she travels, still a wolf herself, to her birthplace of Pellinor. There, she encounters Cadvan, who has survived the battle in the mountains and come to Pellinor at Ardina's advice. She resumes her human form, hears Cadvan's account of his own travels through Zmarkan (which he had pursued shortly in her wake), and reveals her own story to him. Cadvan speculates regarding the meaning of what she has learned, suspecting that her destiny involves undoing Nelsor's captivity of the Speech, which neither Light nor Dark should have achieved. The two of them plan to seek out Maerad's brother Hem, who is significant to her destiny.

== See also ==
- 2004 in Australian literature
