= Taronga =

1986 novel by Victor Kelleher

- First edition cover, 1986
- Author: Victor Kelleher
- Language: English
- Genre: Post-apocalyptic novel
- Publisher: Viking Kestrel
- Publication date: 1986
- Publication place: Australia
- Media type: Print
- Pages: 199
- ISBN: 0-670-81081-9

Taronga (1986) is a young adult science fiction post-apocalyptic novel written by Australian author Victor Kelleher. The story revolves around the catastrophic disaster that destroys the Earth as we know it and its impact on Australia in the Southern Hemisphere. It is not directly revealed to the audience what has caused this apocalypse, but it is assumed that it was due to global war. The protagonist is a young teenager named Ben, who has developed telepathic powers and is able to communicate with animals.

== Plot ==
=== Part One: The Calling ===
The book begins two years after the Last Days. Ben lives with a callous man named Greg, who uses Ben's powers, which he calls "the Call", to attract game for hunting. Ben feels guilty about leading the animals to their death but faces a beating from Greg if he does not comply. When he finally escapes, he promises not to use the Call again. He breaks this promise less than a day later when he is pursued by a man on horseback. He Calls the horse causing it to fall and crush the man. Seeing the horse suffer, Ben shoots it but leaves the man. Ben then realises there are people in the distance coming closer with guns. Ben runs for his life, fearing capture.

Ben decides to return to Sydney, where he once lived with his parents. He travels first on foot, then by bike, using mountain roads to avoid local gang activity. He is joined by a stray dog who would do anything for Ben, having become loyal as they grew close in their travels.

As he draws closer to his destination, he hears the Call of something wild and ferocious. When he reaches the city, only then he realizes that the wild Call is coming from Taronga Zoo. He then makes a hard decision to travel to Taronga Zoo to find out what creature could still be so wild and free in a zoo.

=== Part Two: The Trial ===
In Sydney, Ben is chased by a gang. The dog sacrifices itself to give Ben the opportunity to escape, but Ben is still captured. The gang takes Ben to Taronga Zoo, which houses another gang of survivors and is guarded by tigers and other predators. The gang wishes to break into the zoo and plans to use Ben as bait.

Inside, Ben is almost attacked by two tigers, Raja and Ranee. He is saved by Ellie, an Aboriginal girl who is in charge of the big cats. She takes him to the community leader, Molly, who allows Ben to stay after he proves that he can also round up and cage the cats. Ben quickly earns the trust of all of the animals except for Raja, the male tiger, who hates Ben for restricting his physical freedom.

Although Ben originally sees Taronga as an ideal community, he soon discovers that Molly is a ruthless and selfish leader. When the Sydney gang tries to break into the zoo, Molly divulges her plan to burn Taronga to the ground rather than let another gang occupy it. Ben and Ellie decide to act.

=== Part Three: The Answer ===
Ben convinces the rival gang that he wants to help them break in and they set a date for an ambush. During the next week, Ben and Ellie cut several holes in the outer fence. Some of which are disguise by strong growth of ivy. On the day of the ambush, they set the animals free. The Sydney gang invades the zoo and both gang fight. Ben and Ellie are hinted at being the only survivors together with the animals.

Ben once again swears that he will no longer use the Call. When he is later cornered by Raja, he keeps that promise. Despite the threat, Raja does not attack him; instead, he gives Ben a playful swat.

Raja and Ranee head towards the Blue Mountains and are followed by Ben and Ellie.

== Reception ==
The book was nominated for the 1987 Ditmar Award for "Best Australian Science Fiction or Fantasy Novel".
