= The Riddle =

The Riddle may refer to:

== Music ==
- The Riddle, a 1959 jazz album by Dave Brubeck
- The Riddle (album), a 1984 rock album by Nik Kershaw
  - "The Riddle" (Nik Kershaw song), also covered by many artists including Gigi D'Agostino, and Jack Holiday & Mike Candys
- "The Riddle" (Five for Fighting song), 2006
- "The Riddle", a song in the musical The Scarlet Pimpernel (musical)
- "The Riddle Song", English lullaby also known as "I Gave My Love a Cherry"
- "Tell Me Why (The Riddle)", a 2000 song by Paul van Dyk in collaboration with Saint Etienne
- "The Riddle", a song by Steve Vai on his 1990 album Passion and Warfare

== Literature ==
- The Riddle (novel), a 2004 fantasy book of the Pellinor series by Alison Croggon
- The Riddle (fairy tale), one of Grimm's Fairy Tales
- "The Riddle", a 1923 short story by Walter de la Mare

== Film ==
- Paheli (2005 film) or The Riddle, 2005 Indian ghost film
- The Riddle (film), a 2007 film starring Derek Jacobi

== Locations ==
- The Riddle, Herefordshire, a settlement in England, United Kingdom
