= A Simple Death (novel) =

2001 crime novel by Australian author Carolyn Morwood

- Author: Carolyn Morwood
- Language: English
- Series: Marlo Shaw Crime Thriller
- Genre: Crime novel
- Publisher: Women's Press
- Publication date: 2001
- Publication place: U.K.
- Media type: Print
- Pages: 241 pp.
- Awards: 2002 Davitt Award, Best Adult Novel, winner
- ISBN: 070434727X
- Preceded by: An Uncertain Death
- Followed by: -

A Simple Death is a 2001 crime novel by the Australian author Carolyn Morwood.

It is the second novel in the author's "Marlo Shaw Crime Thriller" series following An Uncertain Death which was published in 1999.

It was the winner of the Davitt Award for Best Adult Novel in 2002.

== Synopsis ==
After Marlo Shaw and her friend Harold Underhill find a tramp beaten to death in a Melbourne park, Marlo's friend falls under suspicion of the murder. Marlo is reluctantly drawn into the investigation as a result.

== Critical reception ==
Writing in The Canberra Times Jeff Popple found a lot to like about the novel: "Marlo is one of the few credible amateur detectives around and her investigation eschews the usual unlikely heroics and implausible encounters with the police. The characters ring true and Morwood plants sufficient false clues to keep you guessing. In all, another good mystery by an author who is yet to achieve the level of recognition she deserves in Australian crime-writing circles."

== Notes ==
- Dedication: To Margery; First (and best) storyteller. And to Norm Who taught me how run over rocks.

== See also ==
- 2001 in Australian literature
