= The Resurrectionists =

2000 horror novel by Kim Wilkins

- First edition
- Author: Kim Wilkins
- Language: English
- Genre: Horror
- Publisher: HarperCollins
- Publication date: 2000
- Publication place: Australia
- Media type: Print (Paperback)
- Pages: 527 pp
- ISBN: 0-7322-6797-8

The Resurrectionists is a 2000 horror novel by Kim Wilkins. It is the story of Maisie Fielding who, bored with her job and family, returns to England to research her grandmother, who is a "white witch".

== Background ==
The Resurrectionists was first published in Australia in 2000 by HarperCollins in trade paperback format. It was re-published in Australia and the United Kingdom in mass market paperback format in 2001 and in 2003 was published in e-book format. The Resurrectionists won the 2000 Aurealis Award for best horror novel.
