= Giants of the Frost =

2004 novel by Kim Wilkins

- Giants of the Frost first edition cover.
- Author: Kim Wilkins
- Cover artist: Gayna Murphy
- Language: English
- Genre: Fantasy, horror
- Publisher: Voyager
- Publication date: 28 April 2004
- Publication place: Australia
- Media type: Print (hardback & paperback)
- Pages: 448 pp (first edition)
- ISBN: 978-0-7322-7405-4

Giants of the Frost is a 2004 horror/fantasy novel by Kim Wilkins. It follows the story of Victoria Scott who after accepting a job on an isolated island is visited by a hag in her nightmares and a sense of familiarity in the haunted forest. In the world of Asgard, Vidar has exiled himself in order to await the reincarnation of the woman he loved.

== Background ==
Giants of the Frost was first published in Australia on 28 April 2004 by Voyager in trade paperback format. It was released in the United Kingdom in both hardback and paperback formats in 2005 and in the United States in paperback format in 2006. It was re-released in Australis in mass market paperback in 2005 and then as an audio edition in 2007 by Bolinda Publishing. Giants of the Frost was a short-list nominee for the 2004 Aurealis Award for best fantasy novel and best horror novel but lost to Sean Williams' The Crooked Letter and Richard Harland's The Black Crusade respectively.
