= Del-Del =

1992 book by Victor Kelleher

- Cover of the first edition of Del-Del
- Author: Victor Kelleher
- Cover artist: Peter Clarke
- Language: English
- Genre: Young adult
- Publisher: Walker & Company
- Publication date: 1992
- Publication place: Australia
- Media type: Print (Paperback)
- Pages: 192 pp
- ISBN: 978-0-8027-8154-3

Del-Del is a psychological young adult novel written by Australian author Victor Kelleher and published in 1992. It deals with themes of loss and apparent demonic possession.

== Plot ==
Del-Del is narrated by Beth, a teenage girl whose younger brother, a child prodigy named Sam, begins exhibiting strange behavior on the anniversary of the death of their sister Laura. He begins to refer to himself as Del-Del, and acts out in increasingly destructive and harmful ways. Eventually the family begins to believe that he has become the victim of demonic possession, and seeks a variety of solutions. Eventually they successfully banish the Del-Del personality with the assistance of an exorcist, only to have it return once more, this time in the form of an alien consciousness inhabiting Sam's body. This being, also calling itself Del-Del, claims to be a traveler from the constellation Delphinus. Eventually it is determined that the various personalities of Del-Del are in fact products of Sam's overactive mind, the result of his inability to accept the loss of his sister.

== Reception ==
Del-Del was nominated for a Ditmar Award in the year that it was released. Publishers Weekly criticized the book, calling it 'padded', and stated that "(the) pat resolution may not sit well with readers who continue to reach the novel's end."
