= Joan Beaumont =

Australian historian and academic

Joan Beaumont AM, FASSA
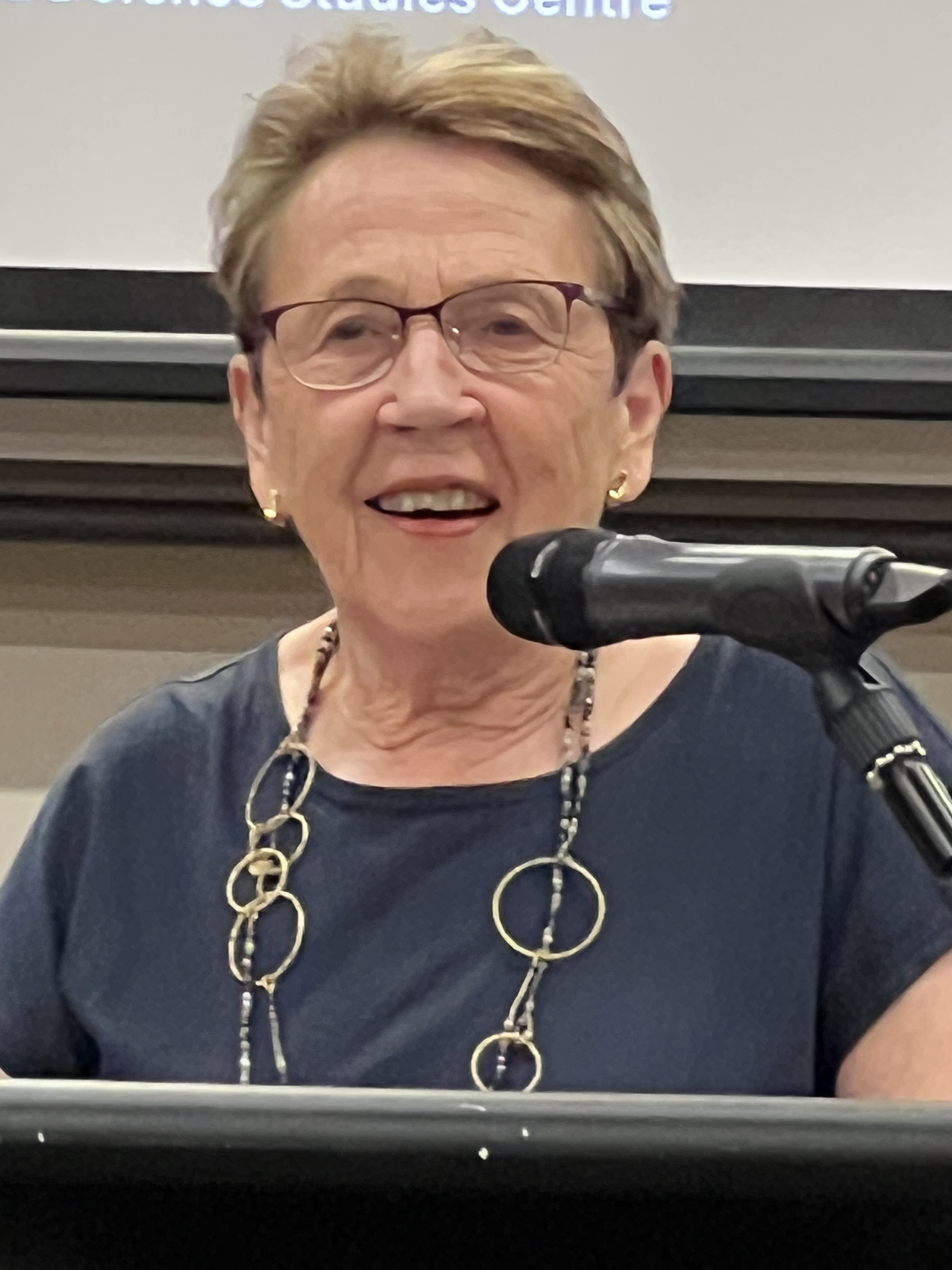
- In November 2025
- Born: Joan Errington Magor; 25 October 1948 (age 77); Adelaide, South Australia
- Awards: Fellow of the Academy of the Social Sciences in Australia (1997); Fellow of the Royal Society of New South Wales; Fellow of the Australian Institute of International Affairs (2012); Prime Minister's Prize for Australian History (2014); New South Wales Premier's Australian History Prize (2014); University of Southern Queensland History Book Award (2014); Asher Literary Award (2015); Member of the Order of Australia (2020)

Academic background
- Education: University of Adelaide (BA [Hons]); King's College London (PhD)
- Thesis: Great Britain and the Soviet Union: The Supply of Munitions, 1941–1945 (1975)
- Doctoral advisor: M. L. Dockrill

Academic work
- Institutions: Australian National University; Deakin University; Monash University
- Main interests: Australian experience of war Foreign policy Memory and commemoration
- Notable works: Gull Force (1988); Broken Nation (2013)

Joan Errington Beaumont, AM, FASSA (born 25 October 1948) is an Australian historian and academic, who specialises in foreign policy and the Australian experience of war. She is professor emerita in the Strategic and Defence Studies Centre at the Australian National University.

== Early life and education ==
Beaumont was born Joan Errington Magor on 25 October 1948 in Adelaide, South Australia, to Clifford James Magor and his wife Edna Jean (née Errington). Educated at Unley High School, she completed a Bachelor of Arts degree with Honours at the University of Adelaide in 1970. In her final year, Beaumont was appointed a tutor in modern European history at the university. In 1971, she was awarded a British Commonwealth Scholarship to undertake doctoral studies at King's College London. Under the guidance of M. L. Dockrill, Beaumont graduated in 1975 with a thesis titled "Great Britain and the Soviet Union: The Supply of Munitions, 1941–1945". During her time in London, Beaumont wed Oliver James Beaumont in 1973. The couple had three daughters, before the union ended in divorce.

== Academic career ==
On her return to Australia, Beaumont worked as an editor for Melbourne University Press. In 1976, she gained a position tutoring in British colonial history at La Trobe University, before being appointed to a lectureship at Deakin University the following year. Promoted to senior lecturer, Beaumont's doctoral thesis was published in 1980 as her first book: Comrades in Arms: British Aid to Russia, 1941–1945. In 1985, she was appointed Lecturer in British and Australian History at Monash University. After three years in the post, she returned to Deakin as a senior lecturer in 1988; her second book, Gull Force: Survival and Leadership in Captivity, 1941–1945, was published by Allen & Unwin the same year. Her research analysed the experience of the Australian prisoners of war captured by the Japanese on Ambon in 1942. Beaumont was promoted to reader in 1990.

Beaumont has occupied a number of senior academic leadership positions since 1993, the first being Head of the School of Australian and International Studies at Deakin. Made Alfred Deakin Professor in 1995, she was elected as a Fellow of the Academy of the Social Sciences in Australia in 1997 and appointed Deakin's Dean of the Faculty of Arts the following year. Beaumont continued in the latter role until 2008, when she moved to the Australian National University (ANU) as Director of the Faculty of Arts. Dean of Arts and Social Sciences from 2010 to 2011, she has been a professor in the ANU's Strategic and Defence Studies Centre since 2012; Beaumont was elected a Fellow of the Australian Institute of International Affairs the same year. In 2013, Beaumont's research into the Australian experience of the First World War was published as Broken Nation: Australians in the Great War. The volume was well received, winning the Prime Minister's Prize for Australian History, New South Wales Premier's Australian History Prize and the University of Southern Queensland History Book Award in 2014, and the 2015 Asher Literary Award from the Australia Council for the Arts. Broken Nation was also short-listed for the Western Australian Premier's Book Award for Non-fiction and the Council for the Humanities, Arts & Social Sciences Prize for a Book. Beaumont retired from full-time academia in 2016, and was appointed professor emerita at the ANU.

Beaumont was appointed a Member of the Order of Australia in the 2020 Australia Day Honours. The award recognised her "significant service to education, particularly to the study of war history."

== Bibliography ==
=== Books ===
- — (1980). Comrades in Arms: British Aid to Russia, 1941–1945. London: Davis-Poynter. ISBN 9780706702323.
- — (1988). Gull Force: Survival and Leadership in Captivity, 1941–1945. Sydney: Allen & Unwin. ISBN 9780043020081.
- — (2013). Broken Nation: Australians in the Great War. Sydney: Allen & Unwin. ISBN 9781741751383.
- — (2022). Australia's Great Depression: How a Nation Shattered by the Great War Survived the Worst Economic Crisis it Has Ever Faced. Sydney: Allen & Unwin. ISBN 9781760293987.
- — (2025). Gull Force: Australian POWs on Ambon and Hainan, 1941-45. Sydney: NewSouth Publishing. ISBN 9781761170027.

=== Edited books ===
- —, ed. (1995). Australia's War, 1914–18. Sydney: Allen & Unwin. ISBN 9781863734615.
- —, ed. (1996). Australia's War, 1939–45. Sydney: Allen & Unwin. ISBN 9781864480399.
- —, ed. (2001). Australian Defence: Sources and Statistics. The Australian Centenary History of Defence. Vol. 6. Melbourne: Oxford University Press. ISBN 9780195541182.
- —; Waters, Christopher; Lowe, David; Woodard, Garry, eds. (2003). Ministers, Mandarins And Diplomats: Australian Foreign Policy Making, 1941–1969. Melbourne: Melbourne University Publishing. ISBN 9780522850475.
- —; O'Brien, Ilma Martinuzzi; Trinca, Matthew, eds. (2008). Under Suspicion: Citizenship and Internment in Australia during the Second World War. Canberra: National Museum of Australia Press. ISBN 9781876944605.
- —; Jordan, Matt, eds. (2013). Australia and the World: A Festschrift for Neville Meaney. Sydney: Sydney University Press. ISBN 9781743320006.
- —; Grant, Lachlan; Pegram, Aaron, eds. (2015). Beyond Surrender: Australian Prisoners of War in the Twentieth Century. South Carlton, Victoria: Melbourne University Publishing. ISBN 9780522866216.
- —; Cadzow, Allison, eds. (2018). Serving Our Country: Indigenous Australians, War, Defence and Citizenship. Sydney: NewSouth Publishing. ISBN 9781742235394.
- —; Pratten, Garth, eds. (2025). Military History Supremo: Essays in Honour of David Horner AM FASSA. Canberra: ANU Press. ISBN 9781760466848.
