= A. L. McCann =

Australian academic and writer

- Born: 1966 (age 59–60)
- Writing career
- Genre: Horror
- Notable awards: Aurealis Award; Horror division 2002 The White Body of Evening

Andrew Lachlan McCann is an Australian academic and writer of horror fiction.

== Biography ==
McCann lives in Victoria and holds both an MA from the University of Melbourne and a PhD from Cornell University. His academic work has won him awards and fellowships. McCann has also published works on topics such as politics and history. He is a lecturer at the Melbourne University's English Department. McCann's first novel, The White Body of Evening, was published in 2002 by HarperCollins. It won the 2002 Aurealis Award for best horror novel. His second novel, Subtopia, was published in 2005 by Vulgar Press.

He is a contributor to the Sydney Review of Books.

== Bibliography ==
- The White Body of Evening (2002)
- Subtopia (2005)
