= Simon Haynes =

Australian writer

- Born: United Kingdom
- Writing career
- Period: 2000–present
- Genre: Speculative fiction
- Website: www.spacejock.com.au

Simon Haynes is an Australian writer of speculative fiction novels and short stories, particularly the Hal Spacejock series. Haynes also uses his experience with computers to write software which he designs for himself and then shares for free through his website. The most well-known of these programs is yWriter, a program designed specifically for composing novels. Haynes is a founding member of the Andromeda Spaceways Inflight Magazine.

== Biography ==
Haynes was born in Croydon (United Kingdom) and raised in the south of Spain. In 1983 he emigrated to Australia with his family. Haynes' first work was published in 2000 with his short story "False Alarm" which was featured in issue 27 of Antipodean SF. In 2001 Haynes' short story "Sleight of Hand" won the 2001 Aurealis Award for Best Horror Short Story beating work by Stephen Dedman, Robert Hood, Alison Venugoban, Rick Kennett and Paul Collins. In 2008 his fourth novel in the Hal Spacejock series, No Free Lunch, was nominated for the Aurealis Award for Best Science Fiction Novel and the 2009 Ditmar Award for best novel. Haynes currently lives in Perth.

== Awards and nominations ==
Year	Work	Award	Category	Result	Ref
2001	"Sleight of Hand"	Aurealis Award	Horror Short Story	Won	
2008	Hal Spacejock: No Free Lunch	Aurealis Award	Science Fiction Novel	Nomination	
2009	Hal Spacejock: No Free Lunch	Ditmar Award	Novel	Nomination	
2019	A Riddle in Bronze	Aurealis Award	Horror Novel	Nomination	
2020	An Enigma in Silver	Aurealis Award	Horror Novel	Nomination	

== Bibliography ==
=== Novels ===
- Hal Spacejock (2001)
- Hal Spacejock: Second Course (2003)
- Hal Spacejock: Just Desserts (2004)
- Hal Spacejock: No Free Lunch (2008)
- Hal Junior: The Secret Signal (2011)
- Hal Junior: The Missing Case (2012)
- Hal Spacejock: Baker's Dough (2012)
- Hal Junior: The Gyris Mission (2012)
- Hal Spacejock: Safe Art (2013)
- Hal Spacejock: Big Bang (2015)
- Hal Spacejock: Double Trouble (2018)
- Harriet Walsh: Peace Force (2018)
- Harriet Walsh: Alpha Minor (2018)
- Harriet Walsh: Sierra Bravo (2018)
- A Portion of Dragon and Chips (2018)
- A Butt of Heads (2018)
- A Pair of Nuts on the Throne (2018)
- Hal Spacejock: Max Damage (2018)
- Hal Junior: The Comet Caper (2018)
- The Secret War: Raiders (2019)
- Hal Spacejock: Cold Boots (2019)
- The Secret War: Frontier (2019)
- A Riddle in Bronze (2019)
- Hal Spacejock: Zero (2020)
- An Enigma in Silver (2020)

=== Non-Fiction ===
- How to write a novel (2018)

=== Short stories ===
- "False Alarm" (2000) in Antipodean SF #27
- "Pastimes" (2000) in Antipodean SF #30
- "Infection" (2000) in Antipodean SF #36
- "Sleight of Hand" (2000) in Potato Monkey #1
- "Loss Leader" (2001) in Andromeda Spaceways Inflight Magazine #3
- "Escape Clause" (2002) in Andromeda Spaceways Inflight Magazine #4
- "The Desolator" (2002) in Andromeda Spaceways Inflight Magazine #6
- "A Piece of the Action" (2010) on Kindle & Smashwords
- "Hal Spacejock: Framed" (2011) on Kindle & Smashwords
- "Albion" (2018) on Kindle & Smashwords
