= Christine Harris (author) =

Australian writer (born 1955)

- Born: 1955 (age 70–71); Mile End, South Australia, Australia
- Writing career
- Genres: Children's, fantasy, science fiction, horror, young adult, historical
- Website: christineharris.com.au

Christine Harris (born 1955) is an Australian writer of children's and young adult with works both in speculative fiction and historical fiction.

== Biography ==
Christine Harris was born in Mile End, South Australia in 1955. In 1992 Harris' first book was released, titled Outer Face which was a collection of 14 of her short stories. She has since released numerous other short stories and released three other collections. Harris has also had published over ten novels including three series, written seven poems and released a picture book and two anthologies. She has won or been nominated for various awards including the 1999 Aurealis Award best horror novel for Foreign Devil, and the 2009 White Ravens Award for Audrey of the Outback, among others. She was joint winner of the 2009 Children's Peace Literature Award for Audrey Goes to Town.

== Bibliography ==
=== Novels ===
==== Vibes ====
- Jigsaw (1998)
- Shadows (1998)
- Masks (1998)
- Suspicion (1998)

==== Hot Shots ====
- Brain Drain (2001)
- Windbag (2001)
- Psycho Gran (2001)

==== Spy Girl ====
- Secrets (2004)
- Fugitive (2005)
- Nightmare (2006)
- Danger (2006)
- Twisted (2007)

==== Audrey of the Outback ====
- It's a Miroocool! Picture book (2012)
- Audrey of the Outback (2008)
- Audrey Goes to Town (2008)
- Audrey's Big Secret (2009)

==== Raven Lucas ====
- Missing (2012)
- Dead Wrong (2012)

==== Other novels ====
- Strike! (1994)
- Outer Face (1995)
- Countdown (1995)
- Baptism of Fire (1996)
- Pitt Man (1996)
- Deadly Friends (1997)
- Slime Time (1997)
- Torture Chamber (1997)
- Foreign Devil (1999)
- Omega (2000)
- Jamil's Shadow (2001)
- Hairy Legs (2001)
- Halfway Round The World (2001)
- Head Space (2004)
- Outback: The Diary of Jimmy Porter 1927-1928 (2005)
- Cool Bananas (2007)
- Mask of the Jackal (2007)

=== Collections ===
- Outer Face (1992)
- Buried Secrets (1993)
- Widdershins (aka Party Animals) (1995)
- Fortune Cookies (1998)
- Warped (2000)

=== Omnibuses ===
- Mystery Stories for Girls (2006) (part of the 7 Sister Mysteries with Ellen Miles)
- Freaks (2007) (features Torture Chamber, Wally the Undead, and Slime Time)

=== Plays ===
- Break a Leg (2001)

=== Chapter books ===
- It Came from the Lab (1999)
- Brain Drain (2001)

=== Picture books ===
- Sleeping In (1997)
- I Don't Want to Go to School (2000)
- Snowy's Rescue (2007)

=== Non-fiction ===
- Trees in My Ears: Children from Around the World Talk to Christine Harris (1992)
- Oddballs (1998)
- Little Book of Elephants (2000)

=== Poems ===
- Suffocating (2000) in Warped
- Mesmerised (2000) in Warped
- Sick (2000) in Warped
- Splatter (2000) in Warped
- Scream (2000) in Warped
- Sharp (2000) in Warped
- Control (2000) in Warped

=== Short fiction ===
- "Aliens Sprom Outer Face" (1992) in Outer Face
- "Jenny and Mouse" (1992) in Outer Face
- "Second Hand" (1992) in Outer Face
- "Mirror Door" (1992) in Outer Face
- "Not Bad for a City Kid" (1992) in Outer Face
- "All About Lavinia" (1992) in Outer Face
- "The Book of Spells" (1992) in Outer Face
- "A Bad Year" (1992) in Outer Face
- "The Boarder" (1992) in Outer Face
- "Minding the Gum" (1992) in Outer Face
- "Knocked Out" (1992) in Outer Face
- "When the Dragon Raises Its Head" (1992) in Outer Face
- "Perfect Target" (1992) in Outer Face
- "What Mingumma Never Saw" (1992) in Outer Face
- "Seeing Is Believing" (1993) in Buried Secrets
- "Zorro Strikes Again" (1993) in Buried Secrets
- "Black Widow Women" (1993) in Buried Secrets
- "Metal Mouth" (1993) in Buried Secrets
- "Longing for William" (1993) in Buried Secrets
- "Shadows" (1993) in Buried Secrets
- "Alex and Alex" (1993) in Buried Secrets
- "The Missing Finger" (1993) in Buried Secrets
- "Martin John Davis" (1993) in Buried Secrets
- "My Worst Nightmare" (1993) in Buried Secrets
- "The Dream" (1993) in Buried Secrets
- "Waiting for Paris" (1993) in Buried Secrets
- "Welcome Back" (1993) in Buried Secrets
- "Madonna and the Big Night Out" (1993) in Buried Secrets
- "Perfect Replica" (1995) in Widdershins
- "Bedroom Spy" (1995) in Widdershins
- "The Haunting of Clayton Quinn" (1995) in Widdershins
- "Party Animal" (1995) in Widdershins
- "Not Much Time" (1995) in Widdershins
- "My Enemy" (1995) in Widdershins
- "A Sort of Agent" (1995) in Widdershins
- "Throwback" (1995) in Widdershins
- "Widdershins" (1995) in Widdershins
- "Any Day" (1995) in Widdershins
- "Dinner at the Tumbling Turnip" (1995) in Widdershins
- "Monique and the Animal" (1995) in Widdershins
- "Quadruple Babes" (1995) in Widdershins
- "A Real Corpse" (1997) in Shivers: A Real Corpse / Spook Bus (ed. Paul Collins)
- "Rent-A-Crowd" (1997) in Deadly Friends (ed. Claire Carmichael, Margaret Clark, Christine Harris)
- "Hungry Ghosts" (1998) in Fortune Cookies
- "Made in Australia" (1998) in Fortune Cookies
- "Like Father Like Son" (1998) in Fortune Cookies
- "Dear Alice" (1998) in Fortune Cookies
- "Dancing on the Carpet (1998) in Fortune Cookies
- "Any Day" (1998) in Fortune Cookies
- "Another Burger" (1998) in Fortune Cookies
- "A Good Name" (1998) in Fortune Cookies
- "Orange Umbrellas" (1998) in Fortune Cookies
- "The Trap" (2000) in Tales from the Wasteland: Stories from the 13th Floor (ed. Paul Collins)
- "Warped" (2000) in Warped
- "A Stupid Dream" (2000) in Warped
- "Ho Blasted Ho!" (2000) in Warped
- "Make-Believe" (2000) in Warped
- "What About Me?" (2000) in Warped
- "Truth-Dare-Doubledare" (2000) in Warped
- "Use-By Date" (2000) in Warped
- "Love at First Byte" (2000) in Warped
- "Weaver Street Junkie" (2000) in Warped
- "Deciding the Future" (2000) in Warped
- "Alibi" (2000) in Warped
- "Outside the Universe" (2000) in Warped
- "The Class Mascot" (2000) in Warped
- "Together" (2000) in Warped
