= Foreign Devil (novel) =

1999 book by Christine Harris

- Foreign Devil first edition cover.
- Author: Christine Harris
- Cover artist: Reece Scannell
- Language: English
- Genre: Horror
- Publisher: Random House
- Publication date: 1999
- Publication place: Australia
- Media type: Print (Paperback)
- Pages: 302 pp (first edition)
- ISBN: 978-0-09-183899-7

Foreign Devil is a 1999 young adult horror novel by Christine Harris. It follows the story of Tyler Norton who is abducted by pirates from the past and faces a bid for freedom.

== Background ==
Foreign Devil was first published in Australia in 1999 by Random House in trade paperback format. It won the 1999 Aurealis Award for best horror novel and a travel grant from the Department for the Arts and Cultural Development.
