= Asher Award =

The Asher Award was a biennial Australian literary award administered by the Australian Society of Authors between 2005 and 2017. It was established by the Australia Council after a bequest from the late author Helen Asher. It was disestablished in 2017 when the bequest had been fully expended. The amount of $12,000 was awarded to “a female author whose work carries an anti-war theme”.

== Asher Award winners ==
- 2005: The Marsh Birds by Eva Sallis (Allen & Unwin)
- 2007: The Wing of Night by Brenda Walker (Viking)
- 2009: The Orphan Gunner by Sara Knox (Giramondo) and The Ghost at the Wedding by Shirley Walker (Viking)
- 2011: Ruin by Roberta Lowing (Interactive Press) and The Old School by P. M. Newton (Viking)
- 2013: Hannah and Emil by Belinda Castles (Allen & Unwin)
- 2015: Broken Nation by Joan Beaumont (Allen & Unwin)
- 2017: Enemy by Ruth Clare (Viking) and A Soldier, a Dog and a Boy by Libby Hathorn and illustrated by Phil Lesnie (Lothian)
