= Alison Croggon =

Australian writer

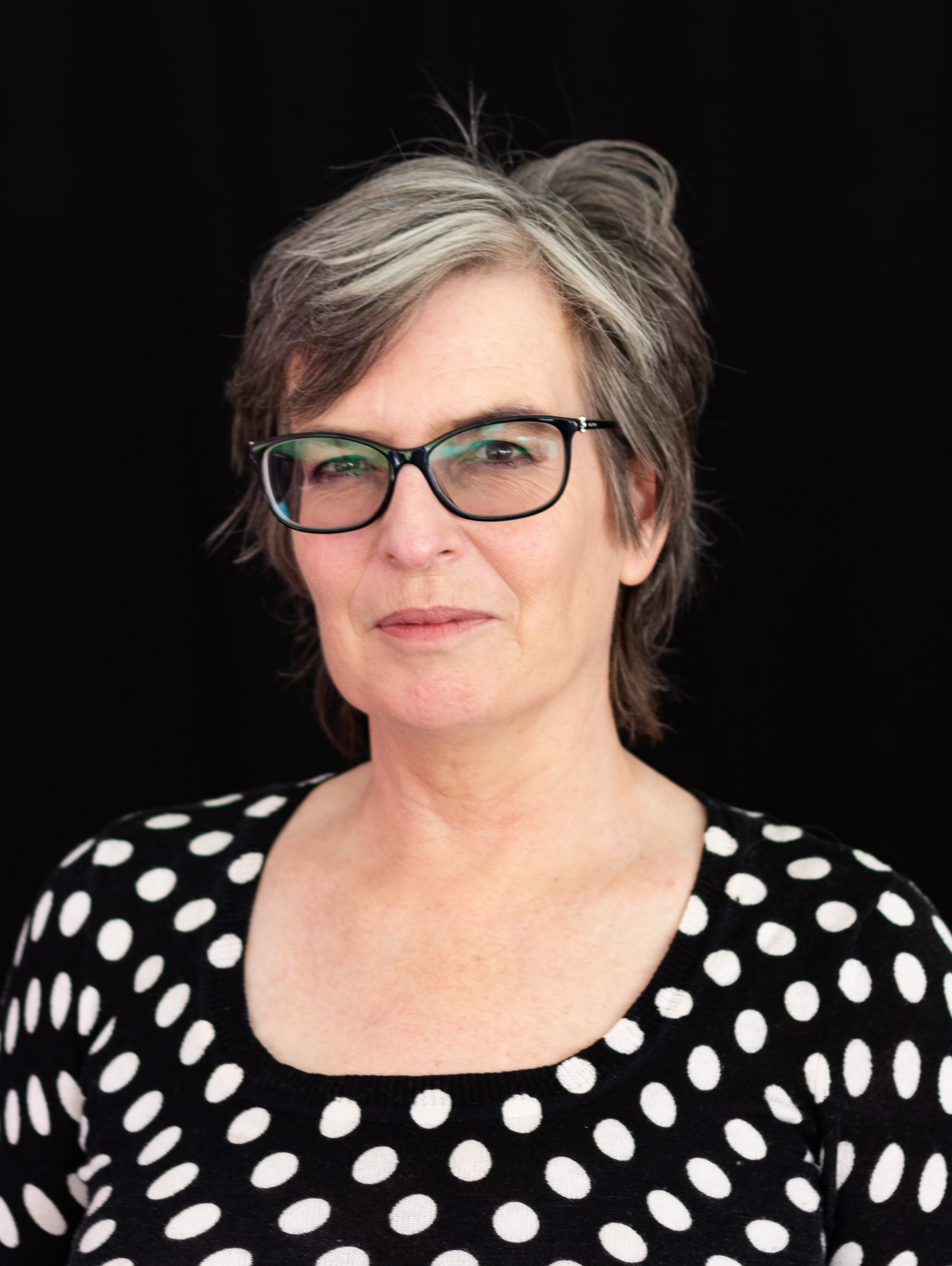
- Croggon at Perth Festival Writers Week in 2019
- Born: 1962 (age 63–64); Transvaal, South Africa
- Occupation: Novelist
- Writing career
- Genres: Fantasy, fiction, poetry, libretti

Alison Croggon (born 1962) is a contemporary Australian poet, playwright, fantasy novelist, and librettist.

== Life and career ==
Born in the Transvaal, South Africa, Alison Croggon's family moved to England before settling in Australia, first in Ballarat then Melbourne. She has worked as a journalist for the Sydney Morning Herald. Her first volume of poetry, This is the Stone, won the Anne Elder Award and the Mary Gilmore Prize. Her novella Navigatio was highly commended in the 1995 The Australian/Vogel Literary Award. Four novels of the fantasy genre series Pellinor have been published. She also founded and edits the online writing magazine Masthead and writes theatre criticism.

Croggon has also written libretti for Michael Smetanin's operas Gauguin: A Synthetic Life and The Burrow, which premiered respectively at the 2000 Melbourne Festival and Perth Festival, produced by ChamberMade. In 2014, Iain Grandage (composer) and Croggon (librettist) collaborated to present The Riders, based on Tim Winton's novel The Riders. Its world premiere was in Melbourne.

Other poems by Croggon have been set to music by Smetanin, Christine McCombe, Margaret Legge-Wilkinson, and Andrée Greenwell. Her plays have been produced by the Melbourne Festival, The Red Shed Company (Adelaide) and ABC Radio.

As of 2023, she is arts editor at The Saturday Paper.

She currently lives in Melbourne, Australia with her husband Daniel Keene and three children.

== Awards and nominations ==
- 2009 Pascall Prize for Critical Writing for her blog Theatre Notes.
- 2023 shortlisted for NSW Premier's Translation Prize for Duino Elegies.

== Works ==
=== Poetry ===
- This is the Stone. Penguin Books Australia. 1991. ISBN 0-14-058666-0.
- The Blue Gate. Black Pepper Press. 1997. ISBN 1-876044-18-7.
- Mnemosyne. Wild Honey Press. 2001. ISBN 1-903090-31-8.
- Attempts at Being. Salt Publishing. 2002. ISBN 1-876857-42-0. excerpt
- The Common Flesh: Poems 1980–2002. Arc. 2003. ISBN 1-900072-72-6.
- November Burning. Vagabond. 2004.
- Ash. Cusp Books.
- New and Selected Poems 1991–2017. Newport Street Books. 2017.
- Theatre. Salt Publishing.

=== Memoir ===
- Monsters: A reckoning. Scribe. 2021. ISBN 9781925713398

=== Novella ===
- Navigatio. Black Pepper. 1996. ISBN 1-876044-09-8.

=== Fantasy novels ===
==== The Books of Pellinor ====
- The Gift. Penguin. 2003. ISBN 0-14-029343-4. (published in the US as The Naming (Candlewick Press, ISBN 0-7636-2639-2)
- The Riddle. Penguin. 2004. ISBN 1-84428-952-4.
- The Crow. Penguin. 2006. ISBN 1-4063-0137-X.
- The Singing. Penguin. 2008. ISBN 978-0-670-07238-5.
- The Bone Queen. Candlewick. 2016. ISBN 978-0763689742. (Cadvan's Story: Prequel to the Books of Pellinor)

==== Standalone ====
- Black Spring. Walter Books. 2012. ISBN 978-1921977480.
- The Threads of Magic. Walter Books. 2020. ISBN 978-1406384741.

=== Libretti ===
- (1995) The Burrow, ISBN 0-949697-25-7
- (2000) Gauguin (a synthetic life)
- (2014) The Riders

=== Plays ===
- Monologues for an Apocalypse (2000)
- Blue (2001)
- My Dearworthy Darling (2019)
