= Born of the Sea =

2003 book by Victor Kelleher

- First edition
- Author: Victor Kelleher
- Language: English
- Genre: Fantasy
- Publisher: Viking Press
- Publication date: 2003
- Publication place: Australia
- Media type: Print (Paperback)
- Pages: 674 pp (first edition)
- ISBN: 0-670-04053-3

Born of the Sea is a 2003 horror novel by Victor Kelleher. The novel is a dark, speculative horror sequel to Mary Shelley's Frankenstein. It follows the story of Madeleine Sauvage, Victor Frankenstein's incomplete female creature, who is thrown into the waters off the Scottish coast. She survives, and embarks on a journey across Europe to find her creator.

== Background ==
Born of the Sea was first published in Australia in 2003 by Viking Press in paperback format. It won the 2003 Aurealis Award for best horror novel.
