= The White Body of Evening =

2002 novel by A. L. McCann

- First edition
- Author: A. L. McCann
- Language: English
- Genre: Horror
- Publisher: Flamingo
- Publication date: August 2002
- Publication place: Australia
- Media type: Print (paperback)
- Pages: 350 pp (first edition)
- ISBN: 0-7322-7467-2

The White Body of Evening is a 2002 horror novel by A. L. McCann. It is set in late 19th century Melbourne where a family is facing a degenerating marriage and the children exposed to the city's possibilities.

== Background ==
The White Body of Evening was first published in Australia in August 2002 by Flamingo in trade paperback format. In 2003 it was re-released in mass market paperback format. The White Body of Evening won the 2002 Aurealis Award for best horror novel.
