= Jason Nahrung =

Australian writer

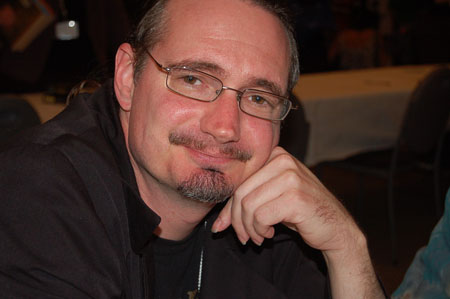
- Nahrung in 2007
- Born: 1968 (age 57–58)
- Occupations: Writer journalist
- Writing career
- Genres: Horror fiction Speculative fiction
- Website: jasonnahrung.com

Jason Nahrung (born 1968) is an Australian horror author and journalist who lives in Melbourne with his partner Kirstyn McDermott. Nahrung has previously written for The Courier-Mail in Queensland, with a special interest in speculative fiction and horror-related topics.

He was co-winner the 2005 William Atheling Jr. Award for Criticism or Review. His first novel, The Darkness Within (based on an unpublished novella co-written with Mil Clayton), was published in June 2007 by Hachette Livre in Australia. Nahrung has also published some horror and speculative fiction short stories.

== Awards ==
=== Wins ===
- 2012 Chronos Award: Best Novel for Salvage (Twelfth Planet Press).
- 2012 Chronos Award: Best Short Story for "The Mornington Ride", Epilogue (FableCroft Publishing).
- 2005 William Atheling Jr. Award: "Why are publishers afraid of horror?" (The Courier-Mail)

=== Nominations ===
- 2012 WSFA Small Press Award: "The Mornington Ride", Epilogue (FableCroft Publishing).
- 2012 Aurealis Award for Best Horror Novel: Blood and Dust (Xoum Publishing).
- 2012 Aurealis Award for Best Horror Novel: Salvage (Twelfth Planet Press).
- 2012 Australian Shadows Award: Blood and Dust (Xoum Publishing).
- 2012 Ditmar Award, Novel: Salvage (Twelfth Planet Press).
- 2008 Ditmar Award, Novel: The Darkness Within
- 2008 Ditmar Award, New Talent
- 2004 William Atheling Jr. Award

=== Honourable mentions ===
- 2008 Aurealis Award, Horror novel: The Darkness Within

== Bibliography ==
=== Novels ===
- The Darkness Within with Mil Clayton, 2007 (Hachette Livre)
- Salvage, 2012 (Twelfth Planet Press)
- Blood and Dust, 2012 (Xoum Publishing)
- The Big Smoke, 2015 (Clan Destine Press)

=== Selected short stories ===
- "Watermarks", (2014), Cosmos magazine.
- "The Preservation Society", (2014), Dimension6, Coeur de Lion.
- "The Mornington Ride", (2012), Epilogue, Tehani Wessely (FableCroft Publishing).
  - reprinted in Focus 2012: highlights of Australian short fiction, (2013), FableCroft Publishing.
- "Hello Kitty", (2012), Midnight Echo No. 8.
- "The Last Boat to Eden", (2012), Surviving the End, Dark Prints Press.
  - reprinted in Year's Best Australian Fantasy and Horror 2012, (2013), Ticonderoga Publications.
- "The Kiss", (2012), Tales from the Bell Club.
- "Breaking the Wire", (2012), Aurealis No. 47.
- "An Incident at Portsea, 1967", (2011), After the World: Corpus Christi, Issue 4.
- "Messiah on the Rock", (2011), Anywhere but Earth, Coeur de Lion.
- "Children of the Cane", (2011), Dead Red Heart, Ticonderoga Publications.
- "Wraiths", (2011), Winds of Change, CSFG.
  - reprinted in Year’s Best Australian Dark Fantasy and Horror 2011, (2012), Ticonderoga Publications.
- "Resurrection in Red", (2011), More Scary Kisses, Ticonderoga Publications.
- "Wet Work", (2011), After the Rain, ed. Tehani Wessely (FableCroft Publishing).
- "Smoking, Waiting for the Dawn", (2008), Dreaming Again, HarperVoyager.
- "The Refugee", (2007), Fantastical Journeys to Brisbane.
- "Kadimakara and Curlew", (2007), Daikaiju 2, Agog! Press.
  - reprinted in Australian Dark Fantasy and Horror Vol.3.
- "Pain Threshold", (2006), Agog! Ripping Reads, Agog! Press.
  - reprinted in Australian Dark Fantasy & Horror 2007 (Brimstone Press)
- "Time to Write", (2005) The Devil in Brisbane.
- "Triage", (2005), Sf-envision.
- "Night Watch", (2005), Elsewhere, CSFG Publishing.
- "Spare Parts", (2003), Glimpses.
  - reprinted in Devil Dolls and Duplicates in Australian Horror (2011).
- "Prime Cuts", (2002), Antipodean SF.
- "Summer Haze", (2001), Visions.

== Reviews ==
- Review of The Darkness Within in Andromeda Spaceways Inflight Magazine by Tehani Wessley (August 2007)
- Review of The Darkness Within in HorrorScope by Mark Smith-Briggs (23 Aug 2007).
- Reviews of Nahrung's work on ASif!

== External Sources ==
- Aurealis Awards winners archive Retrieved 17 February 2008.
- Helene, Talie (June 2007). "Interview: The New Romantics". HorrorScope.
- Inkspillers Ditmar Awards archive. Retrieved 17 February 2008.
- Kemble, Gary (16 April 2006). "Jason Nahrung: the ups and downs of horror". ABC online news (Articulate).
- Kemble, Gary (9 June 2007). "Jason Nahrung and Mil Clayton: Looking on the dark side". ABC online news (Articulate).
- Locus magazine index to Ditmar Awards. Retrieved 17 February 2008.
