= John Harwood (writer) =

Australian writer

- Born: 1946 (age 79–80); Hobart, Tasmania, Australia
- Education: University of Tasmania
- Occupation: writer
- Relatives: Gwen Harwood, mother
- Writing career
- Language: English
- Notable works: The Ghost Writer, The Seance

John Harwood (born 1946, Hobart, Tasmania) is an Australian poet, literary critic and novelist.

== Biography ==
Educated at the University of Tasmania and Cambridge University, Harwood has worked as an academic at Flinders University in South Australia. He left Flinders University in 1997 to become a full-time writer.

While he is better known for his writing on poetry, Harwood made an impact with his first novel, The Ghost Writer, which was commended in literary awards in Australia and which was a winner of a major International Horror award.

Harwood is the son of the poet Gwen Harwood.

== Awards ==
- The Miles Franklin Award for The Ghost Writer, longlisted 2005
- The Commonwealth Writers Prize The Ghost Writer, commended South East Asia and South Pacific Region, Best First Book section, 2005
- International Horror Guild Award for The Ghost Writer, Best First Novel winner 2005
- Dracula Society, Children of the Night Award for The Ghost Writer, winner 2004
- Aurealis Award for The Seance, Best Horror Novel 2008

== Bibliography ==
=== Novels ===
- The Ghost Writer (Jonathan Cape, 2004) ISBN 978-0099460824
- The Seance (Jonathan Cape, 2008) ISBN 978-0099516422
- The Asylum (2013) ISBN 978-0544003477

== Biography and literary criticism ==
- Olivia Shakespear and W.B. Yeats : after long silence (Macmillan, 1989)
- Eliot to Derrida : the poverty of interpretation (Macmillan, 1995)
