= Helen Asher =

German-born Australian novelist and short story writer

- Born: Waltraud Helene Rosalie Ulrich; 1927; Germany
- Died: 19 October 2001; Australia
- Occupations: Novelist and short story writer
- Writing career
- Language: English
- Notable work: Tilly's Fortunes

Helen Asher (also known as Helen Ulrich, 1927 – 19 October 2001) was an Australian novelist and short story writer.

== Biography ==
Born Waltraud Helene Rosalie Ulrich, Asher migrated to Australia from Germany as a post-World War II refugee. Asher and her husband Mervyn were active in the Australian literary scene.

Asher published Tilly's Fortunes through Penguin in 1986. She also wrote under the name Helen Ulrich, and her short stories were featured in numerous anthologies.

Asher bequeathed money to the Australia Council for the establishment of a biennial prize to be awarded to “a female author whose work carries an anti-war theme”. The $12,000 Asher Award was administered by the Australian Society of Authors from 2005 to 2017.

== Bibliography ==
Novels

- Tilly's Fortunes (Penguin Books, 1986)
