= Angel of Ruin =

2001 novel by Kim Wilkins

- First edition cover.
- Author: Kim Wilkins
- Language: English
- Genre: Fantasy
- Publisher: Voyager
- Publication date: 2001
- Publication place: Australia
- Media type: Print (Paperback)
- Pages: 518 pp (first edition)
- ISBN: 0-7322-6789-7

Angel of Ruin (also known as Fallen Angel) is a 2001 horror novel by Kim Wilkins. It follows the story of Sophie who sets out to author a story on the occult even though she is a skeptic on the topic. In pursuit of material, Sophie meets The Wanderer who presents her with a story about three sisters whose love for each other is torn apart by an angel.

== Background ==
Angel of Ruin was first published in Australia in 2001 by Voyager in trade paperback format. In 2002 it was released in the United Kingdom under the title Fallen Angel by Gollancz and in 2003 it was republished in Australia in mass market paperback format. Angel of Ruin won the 2001 Aurealis Award for best horror novel and was a nominee below cutoff for the 2002 Ditmar Award for best Australian novel.
