= Pellinor =

Fantasy book series by Alison Croggon

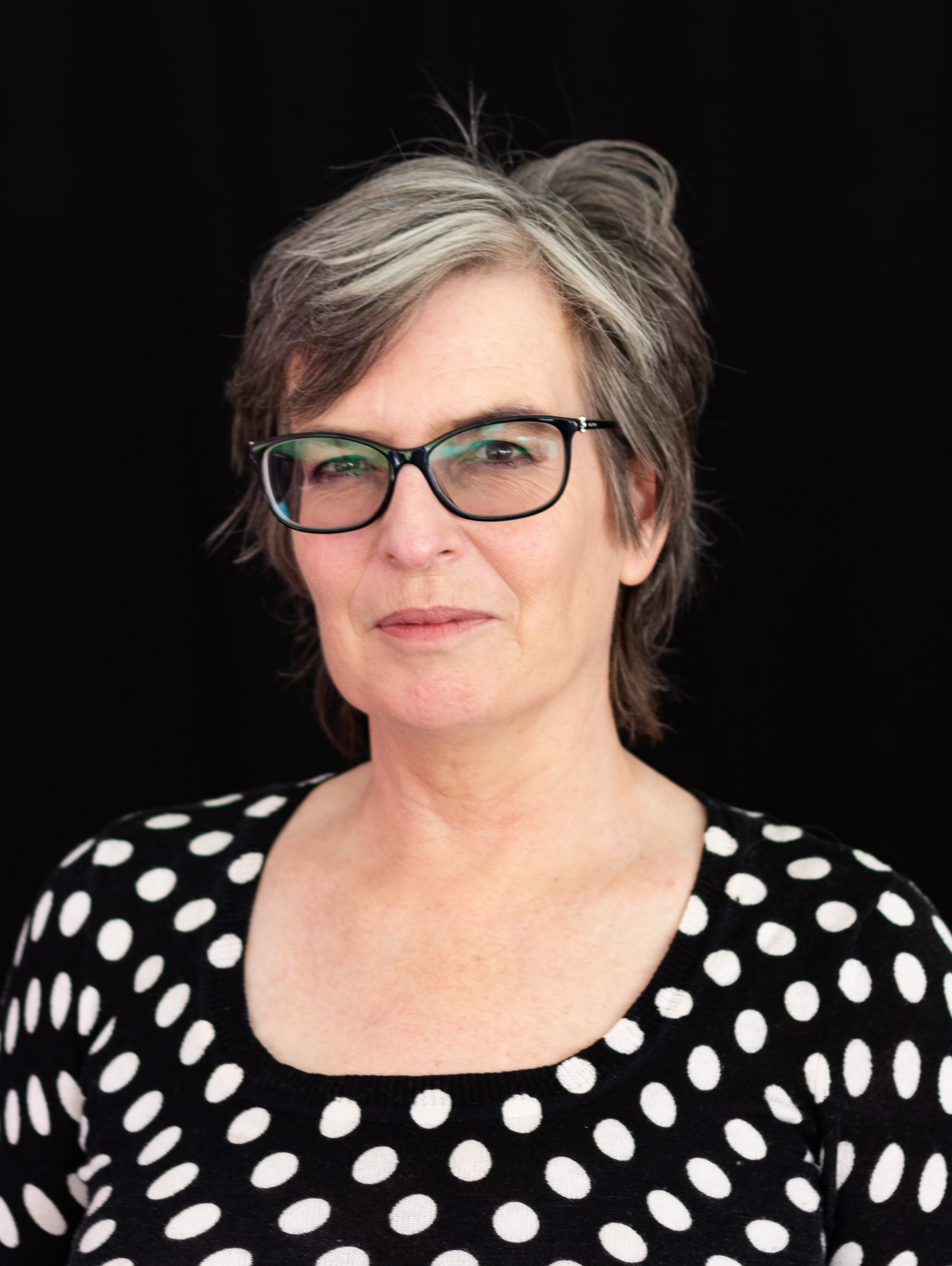
Alison Croggon, author of the Pellinor series.

Pellinor is a fantasy series by Australian author Alison Croggon, spanning four books and a prequel.

The series is the retelling of the "Naraudh Lar-Chanë", the Riddle of the Treesong, set in the fictional world of Edil-Amarandh. The series mainly revolves about the character of an adolescent girl named Maerad, who was forced into slavery as a child along with her mother, after the sacking of the Bard school of Pellinor.

== Books ==
So far the books which make up the series have been published by Penguin Books in Australia, Walker Books in the UK, Candlewick Press in the US (except The Bone Queen published by Walker Books), and Bastei-Lübbe in Germany, with the translation done by Michael Krug.

=== The Bone Queen ===
A prequel, published in 2016. The promising young Bard Cadvan summons a revenant, the Bone Queen, which causes him to be exiled. Cadvan and his friend Dernhil the poet must then track down and vanquish the Bone Queen.

=== The Friendship (short story) ===
A prequel story of how Cadvan and the healer Bard Saliman became friends.

=== The Gift (also: The Naming) ===
First published in Australia in 2003, the United Kingdom in 2004, and as "The Naming", in the United States during 2005.

The Gift begins with Maerad, in "Gilman's Cot" as a slave, where she has been for most of her life, with few memories of her former life, her mother having died several years before. She is discovered by Cadvan, one of the great mystics known as Bards, who reveals to her that she too has "the Gift" shared by all of these, by which she is able to command nature to do her will. Cadvan soon discovers that her mother was Milana of Pellinor, the leader of the First Circle of the sacked School of Pellinor, of whom it was previously assumed that there were no survivors. Knowing this, Cadvan decides to help her escape, believing that it might not be a random chance that he came upon the only known survivor from Pellinor.

Cadvan finds that Maerad's Gift is unusually powerful for one never formally taught; he begins to suspect of her more significance than he had before. Cadvan takes her to the School of Innail, to make the presence of a survivor from Pellinor known and to establish Maerad as a Minor Bard of Pellinor. During their time there, Maerad obtains a long-forgotten prophecy concerning the Foretold One who will defeat the Nameless One. This Nameless One is a corrupt political leader, formerly called Sharma, who discarded his own truename in order to become immortal. Twice has he attempted to conquer the land of Edil-Amarandh, and he has twice been vanquished. His last bid for power is the one in which the Foretold One, Elednor, Edil – Amarandh na or Fire Lily of Edil - Amarandh, will defeat him, leaving him dead or helpless forever. Maerad's own history, being coincident with that of the Foretold One, implies that she is Elednor, although Maerad does not immediately embrace the idea.

After their brief but enjoyed stay at Innail, Cadvan takes Maerad across the country of Annar to the city of Norloch, intending to have her instated as a full Bard and given her Name, and also to see his old teacher Nelac. En route, they discover that the Nameless One's corrupt Bards, the Hulls, are roaming freely, so that non-users of magic are terrified and terrorized; that Maerad is descended on her mother Milana's side from Lady Ardina, a faerie creature, an Elidhu, who still lives in the forest as monarch of a Lothlórien-like settlement, Rachida; and that Maerad has a younger brother, called Hem or Cai, who, like her, is an inheritor of the Gift. Ardina happens to be known by many names: The Elidhu, Queen of Rachida, The Moonchild, Daughter of the Moon.

When Maerad and Cadvan, who has become her tutor, reach Norloch, they discover that corruption has penetrated even here, in that the First Bard of all Annar, Enkir, has fallen under Sharma's influence. He is revealed as the one who had Pellinor destroyed and who sold Maerad into slavery. Largely as a result of this, though also because of his own misogyny, this Bard refuses to admit that Maerad is the Foretold One, or even to let her be instated as a Bard. Therefore, Cadvan and Nelac invoke an archaic ritual called the Way of the White Flame, by which Maerad is initiated as a full Bard. Her Name, at this point, is revealed to be that of the Foretold One; Elednor, which means "Fire Lily".

Driven out by their enemy's hostility, Cadvan and Maerad flee. Maerad's brother is sent to another place for safety.

=== The Riddle ===
The Riddle begins where The Gift left off, with the main characters fleeing Norloch. It was first published in Australia in 2004, in the United Kingdom in 2005, and in the US in August 2006.

The Riddle sees Maerad and Cadvan continue the search for Maerad's destiny, which takes them to the lively island School of Busk, which is a Hellenistic community; north to the realms of the Pilanel, who are Maerad's kin through her father Dorn; and finally to the very heart of the realm of the Winterking, Arkan, another Elidhu, who is a glacial spirit allied with the Nameless One. Hem/Cai (Maerad's brother) has fled south along with Saliman.

As in Innail, Maerad settles in Busk and feels very much at home – more so than previously, perhaps because she is no longer accustomed to expect bullying – while Cadvan continues the search for the mysterious "Treesong", with the help of Nerili, First Bard of the School of Busk, the key to Maerad's destiny. Maerad also begins to explore her powers and their full potential, producing some humorous outcomes. Their peace is shattered by dark events at the annual "Rite of Renewal" and the news that they have been named traitors to the White Flame after the shocking revelations of The Gift, which causes them once again to flee.

Their journey is constantly blighted by setbacks, and by the constant threat from both Arkan and other Bards. Maerad also begins to fear the "darkness" within her own heart, as she begins to wonder about herself, her powers, and her place in Edil-Amarandh's destiny. This fear resolves itself into a constant tension between herself and her mentor, Cadvan, and leads Maerad into an almost unforgivable act that may threaten their relationship and Maerad's wellbeing forever.

=== The Crow ===
Published in Australia May 2006, in the UK July 2006, and in the US in 2007.

The Crow follows the journey of Maerad's brother, Hem, as he begins his training as a Bard in the southern School of Turbansk, where he was taken by the Bard Saliman. The events in this book occur during the same time as the events of The Riddle. Hem has difficulties fitting in this strange land; he does not know the local language and finds it hard to make friends after being a loner for many years. All the while the Nameless One is building his armies to the east; thus, the threat of war is growing. In this climate, Hem makes his first friend in the form of a girl, Zelika from the eastern school of Baladh, and begins to discover his own unique talents and his place in the "Treesong". He travels through places which most haven't been through, like the underground city of Nal-Ak-Burat and the Nameless One's stronghold, Dagra in the constant companionship of a white crow, Irc, whom he rescues in the beginning of the book. He meets the Elidhu, Nyanar from whom Hem will learn one half of the Treesong, to be combined with the half Maerad learns from the Winterking.

=== The Singing ===
Published in Australia in June 2008, in the UK on 1 September, and in the US on 10 March 2009.

In a desperate race against the dark, Maerad must try to solve the final riddle of the treesong. Only then will the Nameless One be defeated and peace restored to the Seven Kingdoms. But Maerad only holds the key to half the riddle - her long-lost brother, Hem, has the other. Before embarking on a perilous journey to find Hem, Maerad must first wage an epic war against the Landrost. And Hem, fleeing the advances of the Black Army, must endure betrayal and mortal illness in his search for Maerad. But the Dark grows ever more powerful - will brother and sister reach one another in time or will all be lost in a final, apocalyptic battle?

== Characters ==
- Bard - a human who is born having the ability known as the 'Gift' in Annar and the Seven Kingdoms or the 'Voice' among the Pilani of the Howes of Murask and Tlon, by which one is able to command nature. Command of nature is wielded by use of the magical language known as the Speech, which all life-forms understand and which any human may learn as a means of communication (as in the region of the Suderain, where it is used by politicians in discussion), though only those born with the Gift can use its words as a means of supermundane power. Although use of the Voice is inherent and usually appears at some point in a child's life, one born with it must learn and develop it as if it were a skill. Individual Bards have differing strengths of power, which determine the limits of their command. All Bards live according to a code of honor known as the Balance and belong to a faction known as the Light, which is sometimes mythologized as a deity. Because Bards are thoroughly schooled to the ideas of the Balance, they are often perplexed by greed and selfishness. All Bards are given an education in the three disciplines of Reading, Tending, and Making, which make up the Bardic way of life. Different Bards adhere to different aspects of these three arts, which overlap and are therefore versatile. Each Bard has a particular speciality within the arts that is central to its life; specialities including both mundane activity and psi phenomena. The word "Bard" refers to a talent and liking for music which all Bards share. Frequently, they are poets, whose poetry reflects beauty and mortality. Most esteemed among the Bardic paradigms is the 'Way of the Heart', which consists of compassion, strong interpersonal bonds, and love. In the diverse societies of Edil-Amarandh, Bards perform roles variously resembling those of musicians, artists, scholars, priestkings, healers, caretakers, protectors, political advisors (in which role they have great influence), mystics, and shamans. All human mystics who appear in the story are Gifted, though not all are considered Bards, given that some of them may not have received training in the Three Arts or schooling in the ethics of the Balance. Both training and potency of inherent Gift determine the extent of a Bard's ability. Bards age slower than regular people do, starting when they turn 20 years of age, and have three times the lifespan of other people.
- Elidhu - Faerie-like creatures who predate humanity in Edil-Amarandh, they are called Elementals by the Bards. The Elidhu have enormous power and can breed with mortals if they so choose. Known Elidhu/Bard hybrids are Maerad and Hem. The power of the hybrids is higher than the average of the two components: Maerad is stronger than the midpoint of the average Bard and the average Elidhu. The Elidhu generally have little interest in the goings on of the mortal world and are seen as neither good nor evil, with two notable exceptions. These are Arkan, the personification of ice, who is often seen as evil (although Maerad is given reason to think otherwise in The Riddle); and Ardina, Maerad's ancestor, who is seen as good. The Elementals also have a variety of abilities uncommon to humans, though these, in turn, seem to vary among individual Elidhu. Ardina is shown having taken the form of a wolf (an ability inherited by Maerad), and sometimes appears as a "moonchild"; a celestial fairy able to hover upon the air, travel great distances within minutes, and heal wounds with a touch. Arkan is shown creating deceptive illusions, producing light from no apparent source, and commanding the weather. Landrost, spirit of the mountain, summons strange demonic life-forms called "wers" to his aid and can direct them by his will. Nyanar, a forest Elidhu appearing in The Crow, is able to change shape with ease and identifies himself with and as his environment. Bards, even those such as Cadvan and Saliman, often show a distrust of them - judging them as fey and amoral beings near-totally beyond human ken and concepts such as good and evil; a judgement that, with the notable exceptions of Ardina, Arkan, Nyanar, and the Landrost, is essentially accurate.
- Maerad - an adolescent girl around sixteen years of age at the beginning of the series. She grew up with her mother, Milana, in Pellinor as young child before the sack of their home. Sold into slavery, Maerad lives her life from the age of seven to the start of the novel at sixteen in the confinements of Gilman's Cot. She is discovered by Cadvan, a powerful Bard of Lirigon who rescues her and tells her that she is a Bard, a person with the "Gift". Later, she is believed by Cadvan to be the Foretold One, known as the Fire Lily, who will save Edil-Amarandh from the Nameless One's most powerful attack, a belief supported by the fact that her true name is Elednor, which means "Fire Lily" in the Bards' magical Speech. As the books progress her relationship with Cadvan progresses and at the end of The Singing the two are a couple.
- Cadvan - Cadvan of Lirigon is a travelling Bard who rescues Maerad from Gilman's Cot and has her initiated as a Minor, then full Bard. He appears to be around 35 years of age, but is likely to be around 70, because Bards live thrice as long as do other people. He is tall and slender, with black hair, dark blue eyes, and an aquiline nose. Cadvan is known to have disastrously handled evil magic in his youth; to have been a worker against the powers of Darkness ever since; and to have extensive knowledge. It is also revealed that he has a preference for coffee, which exists in the novels as "a drink from the Suderain" (probably a reference to the Middle-Eastern origins of coffee), a stronger liking for mushrooms, and the innate ability to provoke revelations of truth from other people, even if they are not aware of knowing it. This ability is called "Truthtelling" by the characters.
- Sharma – commonly known as the Nameless One, Sharma is the chieftain and would-be sorcerer who eschews his own true Name in order to become immortal. He is a lord of Darkness, the evil force that threatens Edil-Amarandh, and is obeyed by several other evil beings, among them the mountain spirit Landrost and the Winterking Arkan, although Maerad has reason to believe differently of Arkan in particular. According to the prophecy, Sharma will attempt thrice to conquer the world, only to be vanquished during the third attack, which is the setting of the story. His domain is Dén Raven, a southern monarchy described as "little more than a huge prison".
- Saliman – Bard of the Circle of Turbansk, one of the realms nearest that of the Nameless One. Because of his dark skin, he is seen with some racism by Bards less wise than himself. Saliman is a friend of Cadvan's and later harbours Hem.
- Enkir – first Bard of Norloch, capital city of the domain called Annar. Enkir is a rigid, self-opinionated figure whose arrogance and bigotry appear to have increased immensely since his rise to power. He ultimately betrays Annar by siding with Sharma and implementing the latter's agenda in Annar, while giving to more gullible Bards that the harsh security measures imposed by himself are imposed for the benefit of the Light. It is he who had sold Milana and Maerad into slavery, and he who later supplies Sharma's agents with weapons.
- Nelac – Cadvan's aged and trusted tutor. He harbours Cadvan and Maerad during their time in Norloch and later helps initiate Maerad as full Bard. Nelac is imprisoned by Enkir on a charge of rebellion, almost certainly because of his role in Maerad's escape from Enkir.
- Hem/Cai - Maerad's younger brother. He goes to Turbansk with Saliman after being found by Maerad on her travels with Cadvan in the first book. Unlike Maerad, who resembles their mother's ethnic background, Hem resembles their father and is thought to have closer ancestral ties with the latter's relations. In the third book, Hem infiltrates one of Sharma's military camps and ultimately Sharma's capital, Dagra, itself. There, with the help of the book's titular character, the crow called Irc, Hem acquires half of the Treesong. The presence of Irc causes Hem to be dubbed "White Crow" (Lios Hlaf in Turbansk's native language) when they have become famous for helping Turbansk resist Sharma's armies.
- Milana - The First Bard of the Circle of Pellinor, mother of Maerad and Hem. She died in Gilman's Cot, her power and will to live having been broken by Enkir of Norloch.
- Dorn à Triberi - husband of Milana and father of Maerad and Hem. Little is known about Dorn, save that he is a member of the Pilanel people born with the Bardic Gift, who traveled south to Annar for his training. Dorn was killed during the sack of Pellinor. He is survived by his children; by Sirkana, the more intimate (with him) of his two sisters; and (until the second book) by his nephew Dharin, who accompanies Maerad to consult with the Pilanel's northern neighbors.
- Irc - a white crow rescued by Hem from being killed by his flock. His name is said to be a synonym of "bird" derived from Hem's ancestral language, Pilani. Irc is an insouciant, spunky, clever, self-important character who acts as Hem's companion, comforter, and messenger. Unlike an albino, he has golden eyes and a black beak. When Turbansk is attacked by the mutant "deathcrows" sent from Sharma's realm of Dén Raven, Hem is inspired by a dream to invoke the help of native birds; at his request, the entire bird population of Turbansk attack and destroy the deathcrows. Irc, throughout this operation, acts as a messenger between Hem and the pelican called Ara-kin, who is commander of the birds. Irc later accompanies Hem to the underground city of Nak-Al-Burat; to the espionage missions on the borders of Dén Raven; and finally into Dén Raven itself. There, Irc observes a quarrel between Sharma and his second-in-command Imank and steals a tuning fork that contains half of the Treesong. Irc thereafter rejoins Hem and travels with him out of Dén Raven. During the story, Irc is shown to have an instinctive sensitivity to imminent danger and to be capable of counting up to five, but not above. He resents being made undignified and enjoys theft, argument, and mischief.
- Ceredin – Cadvan's former sweetheart and loyal friend. Ceredin was killed during Cadvan's handling of evil magic, whereinafter her death proved the catalyst for his refusal to handle it again.
- Dernhil – a Bard originally trained at the coastal School of Ghent, who is first seen at Innail as a librarian. He teaches Maerad how to read and write during her time at Innail. Maerad, being beautiful, unintentionally causes Dernhil fall in love with and court her, but because Maerad is hostile to courtship as a result of being exposed to and almost becoming a victim of rape, she refuses him and actually punches him in panic. Dernhil forgives her and composes a poem to apologise. Later, he is interrogated by two of the Nameless One's corrupt Bards, the Hulls, who are searching for the then-departed Cadvan and Maerad. Dernhil then kills himself in order to protect them.
- Ardina – a fabled Elidhu - once called the Jewel of Lirion - and ancient enemy of Arkan the Winterking. Ardina is renowned in human legend for her strong stance against evil alongside the human Ardhor, through whom she is the ancestor of the family called the House of Karn, whereof Maerad and Hem are members. Ardina herself lives a strange, multiple life, wherein she is sometimes a playful, fey, in the forest, sometimes a wise, solemn woodland queen, and sometimes a "Moonchild" (a figure that seems to be composed partly of moonlight); wherein she might give forth useful discourse or sings such songs as describe the different and often contradictory facets of her character. The fact that she has multiple personalities is revealed only to Maerad (and thereby to the reader), because Cadvan would not "brook contradiction". She acts as a haphazard guide and savior to Maerad and Cadvan at certain points.
- Arkan – called the Ice Witch, the Winterking, and the Ice King, Arkan is an Elidhu who appears as a humanlike figure taller than a man. His power, and indeed his essence, is in the ice, the snow, the winds, and the mountain where he lives. He is a prominent, albeit ambiguous figure in the legends of Edil-Amarandh; often he is a villain, or a personification of Ice Ages. In either role, he is sometimes an ally of the Nameless One. Arkan is often considered Ardina's rival, though he is shown saying that they are not enemies. His views of life are very different from those of humans, whom he holds in some contempt. In The Riddle, he has Maerad captured and holds her in his palace, surrounding her with illusions of a luxurious interior which are only dispelled when she plays her lyre. Here, the relationship between them begins to develop along the lines of a slightly romanticized version of the Hades and Persephone story. Because of their contradictory purposes, Maerad escapes him. In one of the earlier chapters of The Singing, Arkan is shown contacting Maerad by telepathy, scoffing at her fear of the creatures Sharma has sent against her. By this time, it is evident that Arkan is no longer Sharma's ally. It is he who reveals the Treesong to Maerad, and a suggestion exists that he did so moved by his own attraction to her.
- Dharin á Lobvar - Maerad's cousin, the son of one of her father's two sisters. Dharin is a cheerful, confident young man who has long been a trader among the Pilanel and their neighbors. At the behest of their mutual aunt, Sirkana á Triberi, Dharin accompanies Maerad on a journey northward to consult for advice the Inuit-like people who dwell in the farthest north. Their means of transport is a dogsled whose dogs are loyal to Dharin. During their return from the people whom they have consulted, Dharin is killed by the barbarian tribe known as the Jussacks, and Maerad taken prisoner. His death is said to have been foreseen by Sirkana, who is a Bard, with no formal training, only the "Voice" and the "Sight", which is the special power of foresight. It is very rare, even among Bards. Lanorgil of Pellinor, one of Maerad's ancestors was a prominent Seer.
- Hull - a corrupt Bard. Unlike Bards, who try to maintain the 'Balance', Hulls seek only power and often work for whoever can get them the most power. Currently they work for Sharma, the Nameless One. Hulls have all the skills of Bards, but none of the moral inhibitions. They use their perverted gifts to create monsters to aid them in their quest of destruction and devastation. Whereas Bards are unusually long-lived but can be killed like other humans, Hulls are nearly immortal and can only be destroyed by Bardic skills, which requires enormous effort and strength. Maerad of Pellinor has single-handedly defeated several of the strongest Hulls at once, leading to speculation over the depth of her powers. The average Hull appears to the heightened senses of Bards as an undead-like creature having leathery yellow skin, red eyes, and no hair, although they are able to disguise themselves as humans to deceive the eyes of ordinary people. A remark by Cadvan suggests that a Hull can be restored to humanity, but no instances of this are shown.
- Nerili – fondly called Neri, Nerili is the First Bard of Busk (a School located on the Isle of Thorold) and is a stern, commanding, compassionate figure, confident in her authority, and wise in the Bardic "Way of the Heart", a system of beliefs to which Bards adhere. She is magically the strongest Bard of her School and lives (by her culture's standards) an austere life. It is suggested twice or thrice that she and Cadvan have had a sexual affair, according to the premise that flexible sexual lives are permitted among Bards. She shares with Cadvan the ability to compel truth from her partners in conversation. Her grandfather is Ankil, who lives as a goatherd in Busk's internal mountains. Ankil does not have any formal training unlike his brother Elenxi, who is among the First Circle of the School of Busk.
- Cur/Snout – children captured by Sharma's army and gradually brainwashed into serving it by a combination of drugs and psychological conditioning. Because the Bardic ethos considers child soldiery an abomination, the presence of the Curs weakens the defences of the cities they are sent to invade. This impact is enhanced by the ruthlessness of the snouts, who are trained to be merciless or even sadistic, and sometimes by the presence among the snouts of a defender's own child or relative. Snouts are introduced in the third book, wherein Hem infiltrates their training camp in search of his friend Zelika and accompanies a troop of Curs to Dén Raven.
- Dogsoldier – a category of infantry serving Sharma and his Hulls, dogsoldiers are described as cyborg-like constructs consisting of humans to which mechanical appendages have been attached. The name is derived from the double-pronged metal "snout" that projects from each dogsoldier's head; this being one of their chief weapons. All of a dogsoldier's weapons are built onto its body and consist largely of a "liquid fire" of undisclosed composition that is sprayed, often from the snout, onto victims. Dogsoldiers are unvaryingly loyal to their commanders and show no mercy to those whom they are sent to kill.
- Imank – Sharma's second in command who is called, several times over the course of the story, a sorcerer. Imank is a Hull who commands the "Black Army" of Dén Raven when it makes invasions into the region surrounding Turbansk. He is said to have held control of Dén Raven during Sharma's long absence, and to be the most direct threat to the neighboring kingdoms. Perhaps as a result of having been ruler in Sharma's absence, Imank is rebellious against Sharma and resists him throughout the third book. Their final quarrel begins when they contest questions relating to the management of their resources, and leads to fighting between the factions loyal to Imank and those loyal to Sharma. Ultimately, Sharma confronts Imank, who attempts to kill him. At this, Sharma summons the monstrous 'Shika', a race of "uncreatures" that Sharma can imperfectly control. Imank's fate is not revealed, but because Sharma cannot be killed even by another magic-user, Imank is presumed dead.
- Zelika – daughter of a noble house called Il Aran, which lived in Baladh (a school adjacent to The School of Turbansk) before it was annexed and sacked by Sharma's forces. Having survived the slaughter of her family, Zelika traveled to Turbansk alone, intending to die there fighting against the invading army. In Turbansk, she literally ran into Hem, who took her to Saliman, with whom he was living. Zelika became Hem's friend and teacher of the local language, Suderaini. She accompanied Hem on several of his adventures and later joined him and Saliman when they fled from Turbansk immediately prior to its destruction. By this time, her obsession with revenge for the decimation of her family had been reduced, so that she no longer desired to die and was more amenable to suggestion. During their stay in the underground city of Nal-Ak-Burat, Zelika was, in partnership with Hem, trained as a spy for the Light. Their only mission ended in near-disaster when Zelika saw her brother among the child soldiers of the Dark's army and was captured trying to take him from them. She was later killed, although Hem did not know this and risked his own life trying to find and rescue her. After her death, Saliman followed the children's trail to the site thereof and buried her. Hem, upon visiting her grave, stated that he had desired to marry her "when [they] grew up".
- Nyanar – an Elidhu, said to be more typical of his species than are Arkan or Ardina. It is suggested that he was worshipped as a god by the people of Nal-Ak-Burat, in which he appears as a painting. Several times, Nyanar is shown contacting Hem, variously in the form of a "tree man" (a figure combining characteristics of a man and characteristics of a tree), of a humanoid spirit, and of a deer. In the last, he reveals the Treesong to Hem; in the former two, he had sheltered Hem in the places through which Hem travels by concealing him in the memory of those places as they were before they were despoiled by Sharma. Most of Nyanar's character is expressed through his speeches.
