= Kim Wilkins =

Australian writer (born 1966)

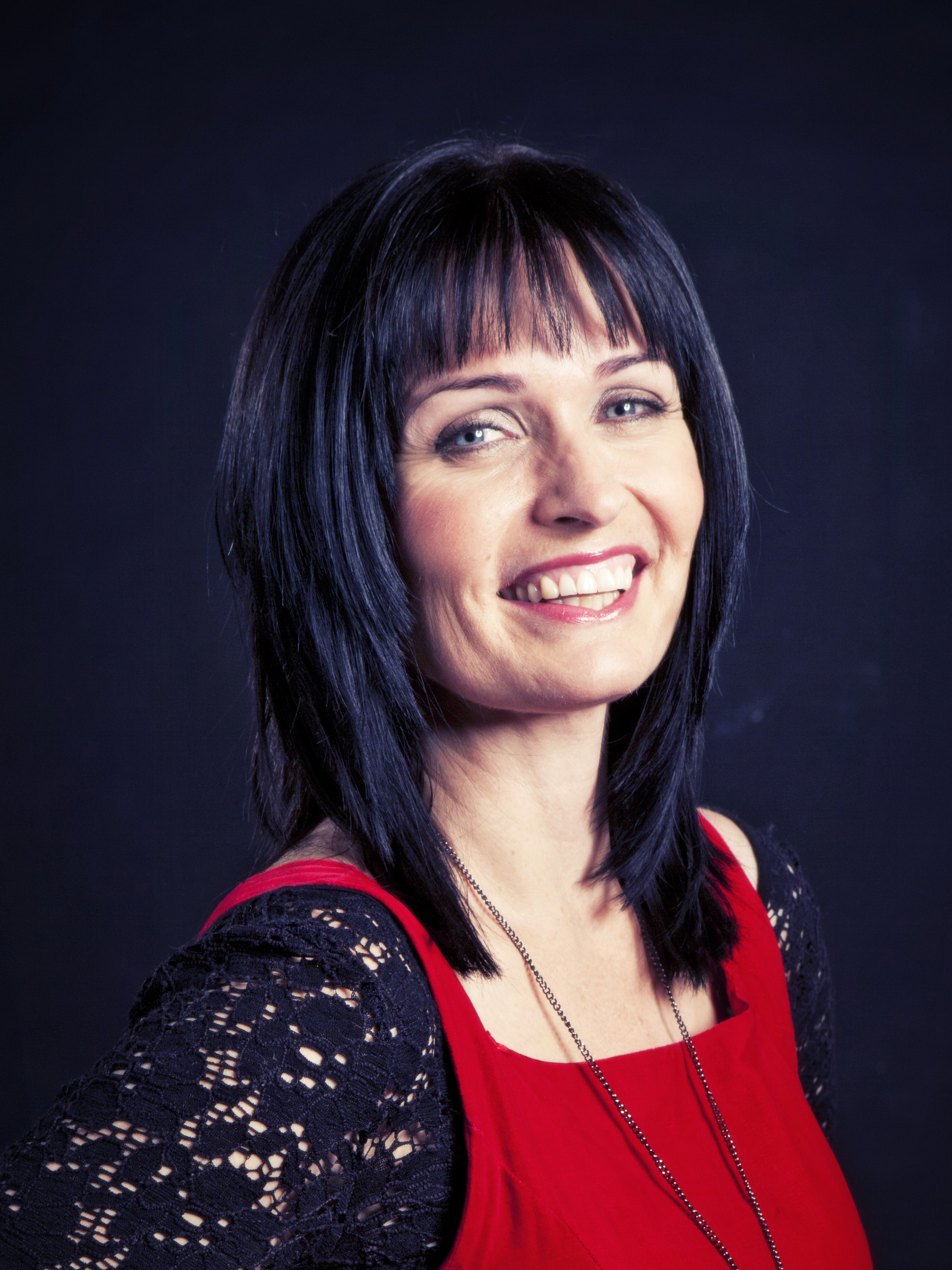
- Wilkins in 2012
- Born: 22 December 1966 (age 59); London, England
- Writing career
- Pen name: Kimberley Freeman
- Genres: speculative fiction, contemporary women's fiction, young adult fiction, children's fiction
- Website: www.kimwilkins.com

Kim Wilkins (born 22 December 1966) is an Australian writer of popular fiction based in Brisbane, Queensland. She is the author of more than twenty-five mass-market novels, including her debut horror novel, The Infernal (1997), which won Aurealis Awards for both horror and fantasy. She has been published in twenty languages. She also writes general women's fiction as Kimberley Freeman.

Kim Wilkins was educated at the University of Queensland. She has a first class honours degree in literature (1998), an MA (2000) and a PhD (2006). She was awarded the University Medal for academic achievement in 1998 and is currently Professor of Writing there.

== Early life ==
Wilkins was born in London and grew up in Redcliffe, Queensland.

== Bibliography ==
=== Adult fiction ===
- The Infernal (1997)
- Grimoire (1999) ISBN 0-09-183918-1
- The Resurrectionists (2000)
- Angel of Ruin (2001) (a.k.a. Fallen Angel)
- The Autumn Castle (2003)
- Giants of the Frost (2004)
- Rosa and the Veil of Gold (2005) (a.k.a. The Veil of Gold) ISBN 0-7322-7407-9
- Duet (2007), as Kimberley Freeman ISBN 9780733621772
- Gold Dust (2008), as Kimberley Freeman ISBN 9780733621789
- Wildflower Hill (2010), as Kimberley Freeman ISBN 9780733623752
- Lighthouse Bay (2013), as Kimberley Freeman ISBN 9780733623776
- Ember Island (2013), as Kimberley Freeman ISBN 9780733630477
- The Year of Ancient Ghosts (2013) ISBN 1921857463
- Evergreen Falls (2014), as Kimberley Freeman ISBN 9780733630033
- Daughters of the Storm (2014) ISBN 9781488742651
- Sisters of the Fire (2016) ISBN 9781489210524
- Odin's Girl (2017) ISBN 9781786362094
- Stars Across the Ocean (2017), as Kimberley Freeman ISBN 9780733633546
- The Silver Well (2017), with Kate Forsyth ISBN 978-1-925212-52-5
- Queens of the Sea (2019) ISBN 9781489257758
- The Secret Yera of Zara Holt (2025) ISBN 9780733633560

=== Young-adult fiction ===
- Bloodlace (2001) ISBN 0-207-19802-0
- Fireheart (2002) ISBN 0-207-19987-6
- Moonstorm (2003) ISBN 0-207-19828-4
- Witchsong (2005) ISBN 0-14-300252-X
- Nightshade (2006) ISBN 978-0-14-300253-6
- The Pearl Hunters (2008) (a.k.a. Unclaimed Heart) ISBN 9781862917514

=== Children's fiction ===
- Space Boogers (2004) ISBN 0-7336-1834-0
- Ghost Ship (2006) ISBN 1-86291-648-9
- Tide Stealers (2006) ISBN 1-86291-655-1
- Sorcerer of the Waves (2006) ISBN 1-86291-656-X
- The Star Queen (2006) ISBN 1-86291-657-8

=== Selected short fiction ===
- The House at Candle Grove (2000)
- Vanity's Bewitchment (2000) in Difficult Love
- The Death of Pamela (2000)
- Dreamless (2008)
- The Forest (2009)
- Crown of Rowan (2010)
- In Horned Wood (2016)
