= Victor Kelleher =

Australian author (born 1939)

- Born: 19 July 1939 (age 87); London, England
- Occupations: Young adult fiction, Children's fiction
- Writing career
- Pen name: Veronica Hart (In two books)
- Period: 1979–present
- Genres: Fantasy, Science Fiction

Victor Kelleher (born 1939) is an Australian writer. Kelleher was born in London and moved to Africa with his parents, at the age of fifteen. He spent the next twenty years travelling and studying in Africa, before moving to New Zealand. Kelleher received a master's degree from St Andrew's University and a Ph.D. in English Literature from The University of South Africa. He has taught in Africa, New Zealand and Australia. While in New Zealand, he began writing part-time, prompted by homesickness for Africa. He moved to Australia in 1976, with his South African wife, Alison, and was associate professor at the University of New England, in Armidale, New South Wales, before moving to Sydney to write full-time. After receiving a grant from the Australia Council Literature Board, Kelleher spent six months of 1996 at the Kessing Writers' Studio in Paris. Many of the books he has written have been based on his childhood and his travels in Africa.

Kelleher has won many awards for his books, such as the Australian Children's Book Award.

== Awards ==
- 1989 – Children's Peace Literature Award
- 1993 – COOL Fiction for Older Readers Award (CBCA) won for Del-Del
- 1992 – nominated, Ditmar Award, Best Novel or Collection award for Brother Night and Del Del
- 1990 – nominated, Ditmar Award, Best Australian Long Fiction award for The Red King
- 1988 – nominated, Ditmar Award, Best Australian Long Fiction award for The Makers
- 1987 – nominated, Ditmar Award, Best Australian Science Fiction or Fantasy Novel award for Taronga
- 1985 – Ditmar Award, Best Australian Novel award for Beast of Heaven
- 1983 – Children's Book Council of Australia Award for Book of the Year for Master of the Grove

== List of books ==
=== Series ===
==== Parkland Series ====
- Parkland (1994)-Book 1 of the Parkland Series
- Earthsong (1995)-Book 2 of the Parkland Series
- Fire Dancer (1996)-Book 3 of the Parkland Series

==== Gibblewort the Goblin series ====
- Goblin in the Bush (2002)
- Goblin on the Reef (2003)
- Goblin in the City (2004)
- Goblin in the Rainforest (2004)
- Goblin at the Zoo (2005)
- Goblin in the Snow (2005)
- Goblin at the Beach (2007)
- Gibblewort the Goblin: The Get Me Outta Here! Collection (2014)
- Gibblewort the Goblin: The Winter Escape Collection (2014)
- Gibblewort the Goblin: The Summer Holiday Collection (2014)

=== Novels ===
- Forbidden Paths of Thual (1979)
- Voices from the River (1979)
- The Hunting of Shadroth (1981)
- Master of the Grove (1982)
- Africa And After (1983)
- Papio (1984)
- The Green Piper (1984)
- The Beast of Heaven (1984)
- Taronga (1986)
- The Makers (1987)
- Baily's Bones (1988)
- Em's Story (1988)
- The Red King (1989)
- Wintering (1990)
- Brother Night (1990)
- Del-Del (1992)
- To The Dark Tower (1992)
- Micky Darlin' (1992)
- Rescue! An African Adventure (1992)
- Where The Whales Sing (1994)
- Red Heart (1996)
- Storyman (1996)
- Slow Burn (1997)
- Into The Dark (1999)
- Riding The Whales (1999)
- The Ivory Trail (1999)
- Billy The Baked-Bean Kid (2002)
- Born of the Sea (2003)
- The Grimes Family (2004)
- Dogboy (2006)

=== Collections ===
- The Traveller: Stories of Two Continents (1988)
- Collected Stories (1997)

=== Aussie Bites ===
- Magic Violin
- The Gorilla Suit
- Tim and Tig (2007)
- What Dino Saw

=== Picture books ===
- Johnny Wombat (1996) (with Craig Smith)
- Where's God? (2005) (illustrated by Elise Hurst)

Billy the Baked Bean Kid

=== As Veronica Hart ===
- Double God (1994)
- The House That Jack Built
