= List of Australian women writers =

This is a list of women writers born in Australia or closely associated with it in their writings. As with other Wikipedia page lists, writers need a page before inclusion.

== A ==
- Mena Kasmiri Abdullah (born 1930), short story writer
- Joyce Ackroyd (1918–1991), academic, translator and author
- Glenda Adams (1939–2007), novelist and short story writer
- Jennie Adams (born 1963), romance novelist
- Patsy Adam-Smith (1924–2001), historian
- Jane Alison (born 1961), novelist and memoir writer
- Ethel Anderson (1883–1958), poet, essayist, novelist and painter
- Jessica Anderson (1916–2010), fiction writer
- Diane Armstrong (born 1939), novelist, biographer and freelance journalist and travel writer
- Millicent Armstrong (1888–1973), playwright and farmer
- Keri Arthur (born 1967), writer of fantasy, horror and romance novels
- Helen Asher (1927–2001), novelist
- Melissa Ashley (born 1973), novelist
- Asphyxia (living), puppeteer and children's author
- Thea Astley (1925–2004), novelist
- Tilly Aston (1873–1947), blind poet and prose writer
- Louisa Atkinson (1834–1872), novelist, botanist and illustrator
- Karen Attard (born 1958), fantasy and short fiction writer
- Bunty Avieson (living), journalist and novelist

== B ==
- Van Badham (born 1974), playwright and novelist
- Kate Baker (1861–1953), critic, editor and biographer
- Margaret Balderson (born 1935), children's writer
- Gina Ballantyne (1919–1973), poet
- Faith Bandler (1918–2015), writer and civil rights activist
- Marjorie Barnard (1897–1987), novelist and historian collaborating with Flora Eldershaw as M. Barnard Eldershaw
- Charlotte Barton (1797–1867), children's writer and educationalist
- Emily Mary Barton (1817–1909), poet
- Marnie Bassett (1890–1980), historian and biographer
- Daisy Bates (1859–1951), journalist and anthropologist
- Catherine Bateson (born 1960), novelist and poet
- Barbara Baynton (1857–1929), fiction writer
- Jean Bedford (1946–2025), fiction writer
- Ruth Bedford (1882–1963), poet, playwright and children's writer
- Larissa Behrendt (born 1969), legal academic and novelist
- Diane Bell (born 1943), anthropologist
- Hilary Bell (born 1966), playwright
- Mary Montgomerie Bennett (1881–1961), biographer and civil rights advocate
- Patricia Bernard (born 1942), writer of speculative fiction
- Barbara Biggs (born 1956), journalist, writer and campaigner
- Carmel Bird (born 1940), fiction writer
- Winifred Birkett (1887–1975), novelist and poet
- Dora Birtles (1903–1992), fiction writer, poet and travel writer
- Marie Bjelke-Petersen (1874–1969), novelist
- Georgia Blain (1964–2016), novelist, journalist and biographer
- Capel Boake, pseudonym of Doris Boake Kerr (1889–1944), novelist
- Christina Booth, children's writer/illustrator
- Jenny Boult (1951–2005), poet and playwright
- Tess Brady (born 1948), fiction, non-fiction, radio drama and children's books
- Mona Brand (1915–2007), poet, playwright and non-fiction writer
- Doris Brett (born 1950), poet, novelist and non-fiction writer
- Hilda Bridges (1881–1971), novelist and short story writer
- Annie Bright (1840–1913), journalist, non-fiction writer and spiritualist
- Hesba Brinsmead (1922–2003), novelist
- Anne Brooksbank (born 1943), scriptwriter and playwright
- Mary Anne Broome, Lady Broome (1831–1911), novelist, travel writer and children's writer
- Pam Brown (born 1948), poet and prose writer
- Mary Grant Bruce (1878–1958), children's author and journalist
- Alyssa Brugman (born 1974), author of fiction for young adults
- Anna Maria Bunn (1808–1899), novelist
- J. C. Burke (born 1965), novelist
- Janine Burke (born 1952), art critic, historian and novelist
- Joanne Burns (born 1945), poet and prose writer
- Marie Beuzeville Byles (1900–1979), travel and non-fiction writer

== C ==
- Caroline Caddy (born 1944), poet
- Kathleen Caffyn, also pseudonym Iota (1853–1926), novelist
- Mena Calthorpe (1905–1996), novelist
- Ada Cambridge (1844–1926), novelist, poet, children's writer and autobiographer
- Marion May Campbell (born 1948), novelist, performance writer and memoirist
- Patricia Carlon (1927–2002), crime novelist
- Jennings Carmichael, pseudonym of Grace Elizabeth Jennings Carmichael (1868–1904), poet
- Maie Casey, Baroness Casey (1910–1983), poet, librettist, biographer and memoirist
- Deirdre Cash, pseudonym Criena Rohan (1924–1963), novelist
- Lee Cataldi (born 1942), poet
- Nancy Cato (1917–2000), historical novelist, poet and biographer
- Nan Chauncy (1900–1970), children's writer
- Connie Christie (1908–1989), children's writer/illustrator, photographer and commercial artist
- Ellen Clacy, pseudonym Cycla (1830–1901), novelist and nonfiction writer
- Monica Clare, (1924–1973), novelist
- Mavis Thorpe Clark (1909–1999), nonfiction and children's writer
- Coralie Clarke, later Coralie Clarke Rees (1908–1972), travel writer
- Maxine Beneba Clarke (born 1979), poet and short story writer
- Inga Clendinnen (1934–2016), author and historian
- Charmian Clift (1923–1969), novelist, nonfiction and autobiography writer
- Jennifer Compton (born 1949), poet
- Dorothy Cottrell (1902–1957), novelist
- Anna Couani (born 1948), novelist, poet and visual artist
- Emily Coungeau (1860–1936), poet
- Jessie Couvreur, pseudonym Tasma (1848–1897), novelist
- Alice Guerin Crist (1876–1941), poet, novelist, short story writer and journalist
- Alison Croggon (born 1962), poet, playwright, fantasy novelist and librettist
- M. T. C. Cronin (born 1963), poet
- Zora Cross (1890–1964), poet, novelist and journalist
- Cecily Crozier (1911–2006), artist, poet and literary editor
- Jean Curlewis (1898–1930), children's writer
- Dymphna Cusack (1902–1981), novelist and playwright

== D ==
- Marguerite Dale (1883–1963), playwright and feminist
- Blanche d'Alpuget (born 1944), biographer, novelist and activist
- Kathleen Dalziel (1881–1969), poet
- Debra Dank (living), nonfiction writer
- Eleanor Dark/Patricia O'Rane (1901–1985), novelist
- Norma Davis (1905–1945), poet
- Sarah Day (born 1958), English-born Australian poet
- Alma De Groen (born 1941), New Zealand-born playwright
- Michelle de Kretser (born 1957), novelist
- Dulcie Deamer (1890–1972), novelist, poet, journalist and actor
- Enid Derham (1882–1941), poet and academic
- Jessica Dettmann (living), novelist
- Catherine Deveny (born 1968), journalist, comedian, author
- Jean Devanny (1894–1962), novelist and nonfiction writer
- Rosemary Dobson (1920–2012), poet
- Nance Donkin (1915–2008), children's writer and journalist
- Sara Douglass (1957–2011), fantasy writer
- Ceridwen Dovey (born 1980), novelist
- Henrietta Drake-Brockman (1901–1968), journalist and novelist
- Ursula Dubosarsky (born 1961), writer of fiction and non-fiction for children and young adults
- Eva Duldig (born 1938), Austrian-born Australian and Dutch tennis player, memoir author
- Susan Duncan (1951–2024), memoirist and novelist
- Alice Duncan-Kemp (1901–1988), writer and Indigenous rights activist
- Mary Durack (1913–1994) novelist and historian
- Vera Dwyer (1889–1967), novelist

== E ==
- Alice Eather (1988/89–2017), slam poet, environmental campaigner and teacher
- Ali Cobby Eckermann (born 1963), poet
- Robyn Eckersley (born 1958), political theorist
- Arabella Edge (living), English-born short story writer and novelist
- Harriet Edquist (living), architectural historian and curator
- Elizabeth Eggleston (1934–1976), activist, author and lawyer
- Anne Elder (1918–1976), poet and ballet dancer
- Flora Eldershaw (1897–1956), novelist, critic and historian
- M. Barnard Eldershaw, pseudonym of collaborators Marjorie Barnard and Flora Eldershaw
- Edith Mary England (1899–1981), novelist and poet
- Fotini Epanomitis (born 1969), novelist
- June Epstein (1918–2004), author, musician, radio broadcaster, disability advocate
- Velia Ercole (1903–1978), novelist and short story writer
- Rica Erickson (1908–2009), botanical and historical writer
- Matilda Jane Evans, pseudonym Maud Jeanne Franc (1827–1886), novelist

== F ==
- Diane Fahey (born 1945), poet and short story writer
- Suzanne Falkiner (born 1952), novelist and non-fiction writer
- Beverley Farmer (1941–2018), novelist and short story writer
- Tracy Farr (born 1962), novelist and short story writer
- Beatrice Faust (1939–2019), women's activist and non-fiction writer
- Minnie Agnes Filson, pseudonym Rickety Kate (1898–1971), poet
- Mary Finnin (1906–1992), artist, art teacher and poet
- Mrs Carl Fischer (1834–1896), journalist and critic
- Lala Fisher (1872–1929), poet and editor
- Kathleen Fitzpatrick (1905–1990), historian, biographer and critic
- Jane Ada Fletcher (1870–1956), nature writer and children's writer
- Pat Flower (1914–1977), writer of plays, TV plays and novels
- Mandy Foot (living), children's picture book writer and illustrator
- Bethia Foott (1907–1995), nonfiction writer
- Mary Hannay Foott (1846–1918), poet and editor
- Mabel Forrest (1872–1935), novelist and poet
- Elaine Forrestal (born 1941), children's writer
- Thelma Forshaw (1923–1995), fiction writer and reviewer
- Jessie Forsyth (1847/49 – 1937), newspaper editor; short stories, poems
- Mary Fortune, pseudonym Waif Wanter (1832–1911), detective story writer
- Lynn Foster (1914–1985), playwright and novelist
- Miles Franklin, pseudonym Brent of Bin Bin (1879–1954), novelist and journalist
- Mary Fullerton, pseudonyms include E and Alpenstock (1868–1946), poet and novelist

== G ==
- Katherine Gallagher (born 1935), poet
- Helen Garner (born 1942), fiction writer, screenwriter and journalist
- Catherine Gaskin (1929–2009), romance novelist
- Sulari Gentill, pseudonym S. D. Gentill (living), writer of historical crime and other fiction
- Doris Gentile (1894–1972), fiction writer
- Katrina Germein (born 1974), children's author and early childhood educator
- May Gibbs (1877–1969), children's author, illustrator and cartoonist
- Anna Goldsworthy (born 1974), writer, teacher and classical pianist
- Sophie Gonzales (born 1993), writer of young adult romantic comedies
- Heather Goodall (1950–2026), historian
- Charmaine Papertalk Green (1962–2025), poet and artist
- Kate Grenville (born 1950), fiction and non-fiction writer and biographer

== H ==
- Lyndall Hadow (1903–1976), short story writer and journalist
- Rosalie Ham (born 1954/55), novelist and stage writer
- Susan Hampton (born 1949), poet
- Eunice Hanger (1911–1972), playwright and educator
- Barbara Hanrahan (1939–1991), novelist and artist
- Lesbia Harford (1891–1927), poet, novelist and activist
- Beverley Harper (1943–2002), author of novels set in Africa
- Jennifer Harrison (born 1955), poet
- Elizabeth Harrower (1928–2020), novelist and short story writer
- Gwen Harwood (1920–1995), poet and librettist
- Libby Hathorn (born 1943), poet, librettist, children's author
- Susan Hawthorne (born 1951), fiction and non-fiction writer, poet and publisher
- Anita Heiss (born 1968), non-fiction and fiction writer, poet and commentator
- Dorothy Hewett (1923–2002), playwright and poet
- Ernestine Hill (1900–1972), journalist, travel writer and novelist
- Fidelia Hill (1794–1854), poet
- Helen Hodgman (1945–2022), novelist and screenwriter
- Ada Augusta Holman (1869–1949), journalist, novelist and nonfiction writer
- Janette Turner Hospital (born 1942), fiction writer
- Eva Hornung (born 1964), novelist

== I ==
- Anne Bower Ingram (1937–2010), children's author and publisher

== J ==
- Linda Jaivin (born 1955), novelist and non-fiction writer
- Barbara James (1943–2003), historian
- Florence James (1902–1993), author and literary agent
- Rebecca James (born 1970), young adults' fiction writer
- Wendy James (born 1966), crime novelist
- Winifred Lewellin James (1876–1941), novelist and travel writer
- Emma Jane (born 1969), novelist and media commentator
- Charlotte Jay, pseudonym of Geraldine Halls (1919–1996), mystery writer
- Barbara Jefferis (1917–2004), radio dramatist and novelist
- Sheila Jeffreys (born 1948), feminist scholar and writer
- Grace Jennings-Edquist (living), journalist and non-fiction writer
- Kate Jennings (1948–2021), poet, essayist, memoirist and novelist
- Helen Jerome (1883–1958), poet, playwright and nonfiction writer
- Alexandra Joel (born 1953), fiction and nonfiction writer
- Judy Johnson (born 1961), poet and novelist
- Rebecca Johnson (born 1966), children's fiction and non-fiction writer
- Susan Johnson (born 1956), fiction writer
- Dorothy Johnston (born 1948), writer of literary fiction and crime novelist
- Elizabeth Jolley (1923–2007), novelist
- Gail Jones (born 1955), novelist and academic
- Jill Jones (born 1951), poet
- Laura Jones (born 1951), screenwriter
- Margaret Jones (1923–2006), writer of political thrillers and non-fiction
- Toni Jordan (born 1966), novelist
- Mireille Juchau (born 1969), novelist

== K ==
- Yumna Kassab, Australian novelist
- Elizabeth Kata (1912–1998), novelist
- Nancy Keesing (1923–1993), poet, novelist and non-fiction writer
- Antigone Kefala (1935–2022), poet and fiction writer
- Gwen Kelly (1922–2012), fiction writer and poet
- Nora Kelly (born late 19th century in New Zealand) journalist, poet and playwright
- Lorraine Kember (born 1950), author, blogger, caregiver advocate, and speaker
- Hannah Kent (born 1985), historical novelist
- Jacqueline Kent (born 1947), biographer, non-fiction writer and journalist
- Doris Boake Kerr, pseudonym Capel Boake (1899–1945), novelist
- Gretel Killeen (born 1963), comedy writer
- Robin Klein (born 1936), children's writer
- Marion Knowles (1865–1949), poet, novelist and journalist
- Sarah Krasnostein (living), American-Australian non-fiction writer and legal academic

== L ==
- Dulcie Dunlop Ladds (1906–1972), short stories and plays
- Gertrude Langer (1908–1984), art critic
- Eve Langley (1908–1974), novelist and poet
- Coral Lansbury (1929–1991), novelist and academic
- Justine Larbalestier (born 1967), young adults' fiction writer
- Glenda Larke (living), fantasy novelist and non-fiction writer
- Nel Law (1914–1990), artist, poet and diarist
- Louisa Lawson (1848–1920), poet, writer and feminist
- Sylvia Lawson (1932–2017), historian, journalist and critic
- Simone Lazaroo (born 1961), novelist
- Caroline Woolmer Leakey (1827–1881), poet and novelist
- Ida Lee (1865–1943), historian and poet
- Valentine Leeper (1900–2001), classicist, polemicist and correspondent
- Julia Leigh (born 1970), novelist, screenwriter and film director
- Constance Le Plastrier (1864–1938), writer, schoolteacher and botanist
- Robin Levett (1925–2008), travel writer, novelist and philanthropist
- Tanya Levin (born 1971), non-fiction writer and social worker
- Wendy Lewis (born 1962), non-fiction writer and playwright
- Bella Li (born 1983), poet and editor
- Kate Lilley (born 1960), poet and academic
- Lady Joan A'Beckett Lindsay (1896–1984), novelist
- Rose Lindsay (1885–1978), biographer, artist's model and printmaker
- Marie Lion (1855–1922), novelist
- Carol Liston (living), historian
- Ellen Liston (1838–1885), fiction writer and poet
- Kate Llewellyn (born 1936), poet, diarist and travel writer
- Lilian Locke (1869–1950), short story writer
- Sumner Locke (1881–1917), fiction writer, dramatist and poet
- Jeannie Lockett (1847–1890), schoolteacher and writer
- Amanda Lohrey (born 1947), novelist and essayist
- Joan London (born 1948), fiction writer and screenwriter
- Abie Longstaff (living), children's writer
- Gabrielle Lord (born 1946), crime novelist and short story writer
- Melissa Lucashenko (born 1967), fiction, non-fiction and young adults' writer
- Laura Bogue Luffman (1846–1929), English-born writer and journalist
- Catharine Lumby (living), journalist and academic
- Dame Enid Lyons (1897–1981), biographer and politician
- Edith Joan Lyttleton, pseudonym G. B. Lancaster (1873–1945), novelist

== M ==
- Constance Jane McAdam, pseudonym Constance Clude (1872–1951), writer and suffragette
- Maxine McArthur (born 1962), science fiction writer
- Dorothy Frances McCrae (1879–1937), poet and short story writer
- Georgiana Huntly McCrae (1804–1890), painter and diarist
- Colleen McCullough (1937–2015), novelist
- Nan McDonald (1921–1974), poet and editor
- Ella May McFadyen (1887–1976), poet, journalist and children's writer
- Fiona McFarlane (born 1978), novelist
- Fiona Kelly McGregor (born 1965), writer and performance artist
- Siobhán McHugh (living), Irish-Australian author, podcaster and documentary-maker
- Elisabeth MacIntyre (1916–2004), children's writer
- Louise Mack (1870–1935), poet, journalist and novelist
- Edith McKay (1891–1963), fiction writer
- Dorothea Mackellar (1885–1968), poet and fiction writer
- Tamara McKinley (born 1948), novelist
- Rhyll McMaster (born 1947), poet and novelist
- Barbara McNamara, pseudonym Anne Willard (1913–2000), novelist
- Bertha McNamara (1853–1931), socialist and feminist pamphleteer and bookseller
- Kit McNaughton (c.1887–1953), nurse and diarist
- Laura McPhee-Browne, fiction writer
- Jennifer Maiden (born 1949), poet
- Barbara York Main (1929–2019), arachnologist and non-fiction writer
- Alana Mann (fl. 2000s), non-fiction writer on food politics
- Emily Manning, pseudonym Australie (1845–1890), poet and journalist
- Chris Mansell (born 1953), poet and publisher
- Melina Marchetta (born 1965), novelist
- Mary Marlowe (1884–1962), actress, writer and journalist
- Catherine Edith Macauley Martin (1847–1937), novelist and journalist
- Olga Masters (1919–1986), fiction writer and journalist
- Christobel Mattingley (1931–2019), children's writer
- Jan Mayman (died 2021), journalist
- Gillian Mears (1964–2016), fiction writer
- Wolla Meranda, (1863–1951), novelist
- Gwen Meredith (1907–2006), playwright, scriptwriter and novelist
- Louisa Meredith (1812–1895), fiction and non-fiction writer, poet and artist
- Elyne Mitchell (1913–2002), children's writer
- Drusilla Modjeska (born 1946), writer and editor
- Dora Montefiore (1851–1933), poet, autobiographer, suffragist and socialist
- Finola Moorhead (born 1947), fiction and non-fiction writer, playwright, essayist and poet
- Elinor Mordaunt (1872–1942), writer and traveller
- Musette Morell (1898–1950), playwright, children's writer and poet
- Sally Morgan (born 1951), Aboriginal writer and artist
- Liane Moriarty (born 1966), novelist
- Heather Morris (born 1953), novelist
- Meaghan Morris (born 1950), cultural studies scholar
- Myra Morris (1893–1966), poet, novelist and children's writer
- Di Morrissey (born 1948), novelist
- Sally Morrison (born 1946), biographer and fiction writer
- Mary Braidwood Mowle (1827–1857), diarist
- Nina Murdoch (1890–1976), biographer, travel writer, journalist and poet
- Joanna Murray-Smith (born 1962), playwright, screenwriter, novelist and librettist

== N ==
- Joice NanKivell Loch (1887–1982), prose writer
- Margo Neale (fl. 2000), historian and curator
- Jill Neville (1932–1997), novelist, playwright and poet
- Brenda Niall (born 1930), biographer, literary critic and journalist
- Joyce Nicholson (1919–2001), author and businesswoman
- Deborah Niland (born 1950), writer and illustrator of children's books
- Cynthia Reed Nolan (1908–1976), novelist and travel writer
- Oodgeroo Noonuccal (1920–1993), Aboriginal political activist, artist and educator
- Marlene Norst (1930–2010), Austrian-born linguist, pedagogue and philanthropist
- Joanne Nova (born 1967), science writer, blogger and speaker

== O ==
- Kathleen O'Brien (1914–1991), comic book artist, book illustrator and fashion artist
- Mary-Louise O'Callaghan (living), journalist and non-fiction author
- Mary-Anne O'Connor (living), novelist
- Mietta O'Donnell (1950–2001), food writer, restaurateur and chef
- Pixie O'Harris (1903–1991), children's author and illustrator
- Audrey Oldfield (1925–2010), historian and children's writer
- Narelle Oliver (1960–2016), artist, printmaker and children's author/illustrator
- Thuy On (living), poet and arts journalist
- Kate Orman (born 1968), science fiction writer
- Beatrice Osborn, pseudonym Margaret Fane (1887–1962), novelist and poet
- Caroline Overington (born 1970), journalist and author
- Jan Owen (born 1940), poet

== P ==
- Margaret Paice (1920–2016), children's writer and illustrator
- Helen Palmer (1917–1979), publisher, educationalist and historian
- Nettie Palmer (1885–1964), poet, essayist and literary critic
- Laura Palmer-Archer (1864–1929), short story writer under the pseudonym Bushwoman
- Susan Parisi (born 1958), Canadian-born writer of horror fiction
- Ruth Park (1917–2010), novelist and children's writer
- Catherine Langloh Parker (c.1855–1940), fiction writer and Aboriginal folklorist
- Menie Parkes (1839–1915), poet and short story writer
- Anne Spencer Parry (1931–1985), fantasy writer
- Jacqueline Pascarl (born 1963), memoirist and parents' rights advocate
- Ethel Pedley (1859–1898), author and musician
- Olive Pell (1903–2002), librarian and poet
- Grace Perry (1927–1987), poet, publisher and editor
- Hoa Pham (living), fiction and children's writer
- Nancy Phelan (1913–2008), novelist and travel writer
- Joan Phipson (1912–2003), children's writer
- Phyllis Piddington (1910–2001), novelist, poet and short story writer
- Doris Pilkington Garimara (1937–2014), autobiographical novelist
- Marie E. J. Pitt (1869–1948), poet
- Marjorie Pizer (1920–2016), poet
- Gillian Polack (born 1961), writer and editor of speculative fiction
- Leonora Polkinghorne (1873–1953), women's activist and writer
- Dorothy Featherstone Porter (1954–2008), poet
- Marie Porter (born 1939), researcher, writer and welfare advocate
- Sue-Ann Post (born 1964), comedian and writer
- Elizabeth Powell (1898–1988), journalist and children's writer
- Marguerite Helen Power (1870–1957), poet
- Eve Pownall (1901–1982), children's writer and historian
- Rosa Praed, also as Mrs Campbell Praed (1851–1935), novelist
- Evadne Price (1888–1985) writer and media personality
- Katharine Susannah Prichard (1883–1969), novelist and playwright
- Alice Pung (born 1981), novelist and memoir writer, editor and lawyer
- Lillian Pyke (1881–1927), children's writer and, as Erica Maxwell, novelist

== Q ==
- Betty Quin (died 1993), theatre manager, playwright and screenwriter
- Tarella Quin (1877–1934), children's writer

== R ==
- Melinda Rackham (born 1959) artist, poet, and author
- Thérèse Radic (born 1935), playwright and musicologist
- Stephanie Radok (born 1954), artist and writer
- Jennifer Rankin (1941–1979), poet and playwright
- Kerry Reed-Gilbert (1956–2019), poet and author
- Elizabeth Julia Reid (1915–1974), Catholic journalist and author
- Ethel Richardson, pseudonym Henry Handel Richardson (1870–1946), novelist
- Elizabeth Riddell, also Betty Riddell (1910–1998), poet and journalist
- Sally Rippin (living), children's writer and illustrator
- Mirandi Riwoe (living), novelist and short story writer
- Judith Rodriguez (1936–2018), poet
- Jill Roe (1940–2017), historian, academic and author
- Betty Roland (1903–1996), playwright, novelist and children's writer
- Heather Rose (born 1964), novelist
- Agnes Rose-Soley, pseudonym Rose de Boheme (1847–1938), journalist and poet
- Alice Grant Rosman (1887–1961), novelist
- Jennifer Rowe, pseudonym Emily Rodda (born 1948), novelist
- Gig Ryan (born 1956), poet

== S ==
- Mary Salmon (1852–1937), journalist and historian
- Dorothy Lucy Sanders, also Lucy Walker (1907–1987), novelist
- Dipti Saravanamuttu (born 1960), Sri Lankan-Australian poet and academic
- Julianne Schultz (born 1956), non-fiction writer
- Margaret Scott (1934–2005), poet, critic and academic
- Maria Jane Scott (1821–1899), novelist, painter and lithographer
- Rosie Scott (1948–2017), novelist
- Jocelynne Scutt (born 1947), non-fiction writer and lawyer plus crime fiction and short stories under noms-de-plume
- Jill Shearer (1936–2012), playwright
- Catherine Shepherd (1901–1976), playwright
- Helen Simpson (1897–1940), novelist, playwright and historian
- Nardi Simpson (born 1975), novelist and musician
- Sanu Sharma (living), Nepalese-Australian novelist, story writer, poet and lyricist
- Tracy Sorensen (1963–2025), novelist and academic
- Catherine Helen Spence (1825–1910), novelist, journalist and social reformer
- Eleanor Spence (1928–2008), children's author
- Dale Spender (1943–2023), feminist scholar, writer and consultant
- Lady Jean Maud Spender, also as J. M. Spender (1901–1970), crime novelist
- Nicolette Stasko (1950–2021), poet, novelist and non-fiction writer
- Christina Stead (1902–1983), novelist
- Amanda Stewart (born 1959), poet and sound/performance artist
- Ethel Nhill Victoria Stonehouse (1883–1964), novelist and poet
- Agnes L. Storrie (1865–1936), poet and writer
- Jennifer Strauss (born 1933), poet and academic
- Anne Summers (born 1945), writer and columnist
- Bobbi Sykes (1943–2010), poet and author

== T ==
- Lian Tanner (born 1951), children's author
- Cory Taylor (1955–2016), children's author and memoirist
- Kay Glasson Taylor, pseudonym Daniel Hamline (1893–1998), children's author
- Kylie Tennant (1912–1988), novelist, playwright, historian and children's author
- Angela Thirkell, also Leslie Parker (1890–1961), novelist
- Margaret Thomas (1843–1929), travel writer, poet and artist
- Holly Throsby (born 1978), novelist
- Glen Tomasetti (1929–2003), singer-songwriter, novelist and poet
- Jessica Townsend (born 1985), children's fantasy author
- Pamela Lyndon Travers (1899–1996), children's author
- Margaret Trist (1914–1986), short story writer and novelist
- Ethel Turner (1872–1958), children's author and novelist
- Lilian Turner (1867–1956), children's novelist

== U ==
- Terry Underwood (born 1944), author
- Jessie Urquhart (1890–1948), novelist and journalist

== V ==
- Elise Valmorbida (living), fiction and non-fiction writer
- Lin Van Hek (living), fiction writer
- Joanne van Os (born 1955), writer of memoirs and children's and adult fiction
- Elizabeth Vassilieff (1917–2007), non-fiction writer and critic
- Barbara Vernon (1916–1978), playwright, scriptwriter and radio announcer
- Julienne van Loon (born 1970), novelist and non-fiction writer
- Mary Therese Vidal (1815–1873), novelist
- Vicki Viidikas (1948–1998), poet and prose writer
- Michelle Vogel (born 1972), film historian, author and editor

== W ==
- Vikki Wakefield (born 1970), young adult fiction writer
- Kath Walker (1920–1993), Aboriginal poet, short story writer and artist
- Lucy Walker, pseudonym of Dorothy Lucie Sanders (1907–1987), romance novelist
- Dorothy Wall (1894–1942), children's author and illustrator
- Ania Walwicz (1951–2020), poet, prose writer and visual artist
- Nadia Wheatley (born 1949), children's novelist and freelance writer
- Ellen Whinnett (born 1971), journalist
- Margaret Whitlam (1919–2012), social campaigner and autobiographical writer
- Anna Wickham, pseudonym of Edith Hepburn, (1883–1949), poet and playwright
- Rosemary Wighton (1925–1994), literary editor, author and adviser on women's affairs
- Dora Wilcox (1873–1953), poet and playwright
- Kim Wilkins (born 1966), popular fiction writer
- Marian Wilkinson (born 1954), journalist and author
- Donna Williams (1963–2017), writer, singer-songwriter, screenwriter and sculptor
- Justina Williams (1916–2008), journalist and poet
- Ruth Williams (writer) (1897–1962), children's writer
- Margaret Wilson (living), television writer
- Tara June Winch (born 1983), novelist and short story writer
- Dallas Winmar (living), playwright
- Eliza Winstanley / Elizabeth Winstanley / Ariele (1818–1882), writer and stage actress
- Eleanor Witcombe (1923–2018), screenwriter
- Amy Witting, pseudonym of Joan Austral Fraser (1918–2001), novelist and poet
- Sabina Wolanski (1927–2011), Holocaust survivor and autobiographer
- Fiona Wood (living), young adults' novelist and television scriptwriter
- Susan Nugent Wood, (1836–1880), Australian-born New Zealand poet and essayist
- Elizabeth Wood-Ellem (1930–2012), Tongan-born historian
- Jena Woodhouse (born 1949), novelist and poet
- Angela Woollacott (born 1955), historian
- Alexis Wright (born 1950), fiction and non-fiction writer
- Judith Wright (1915–2000), poet and environmental activist
- June Wright (1919–2012), crime and non-fiction writer
- Patricia Wrightson (1921–2010), children's writer
- Ida Alexa Ross Wylie (1885–1959), novelist

== Z ==
- Rose Zwi (1928–2018), Mexican-born South African-Australian fiction writer
- Fay Zwicky (1933–2017), poet, short story writer, critic and academic
