= Kember =

Kember is a surname. Notable people with the surname include:

- Gerald Kember (born 1945), New Zealand rugby player
- Hamish Kember (born 1968), New Zealand cricketer
- Harry J. Kember Jr. (1934–2012), American politician
- Lorraine Kember (born 1950), Australian author
- Norman Kember (born 1931), British professor of biophysics
- Owen Kember (1943–2004), English cricketer
- Peter Kember (born 1965), English singer and record producer
- Ros Kember (born 1985), New Zealand cricketer
- RW Kember (born 1983), South African rugby player
- Steve Kember (born 1948), English footballer
