= Conscription in Australia =

Conscription in Australia was in place for most of the 20th century, with young men and boys subject to various forms of compulsory training and military service during major conflicts including World War I, World War II, the Korean War and the Vietnam War. In times of war, the Defence Act 1903 allows the Governor-General of Australia to authorise conscription for service in the Defence Force, provided it is approved by the Parliament of Australia within 90 days.

Following the federation of the British colonies in Australia in 1901, compulsory military training for home defence purposes was introduced in 1909 and expanded in 1911 via the Universal Training Scheme. During World War I, the deployment of conscripted soldiers to overseas theatres was a major political issue and resulted in the Australian Labor Party split of 1916. Two non-binding referendums were held in 1916 and 1917 where overseas service for conscripts was rejected by voters.

Mandatory military service was discontinued in 1929 but reinstated in 1939 after the outbreak of World War II, with unmarried men under the age of 21 required to train with the Citizen Military Forces. From 1943, conscripted soldiers were used outside of Australia for the first time in response to the Japanese invasion of Australian territory. After World War II, compulsory military training was reintroduced under the National Service Act 1951 and remained in place until 1959. The National Service Act 1964 reintroduced and expanded the previous national service scheme and from 1966 Australian conscripts were controversially deployed in Vietnam. Following increasing draft evasion and general opposition to the Vietnam War, the national service scheme was abolished in 1972.

== History ==
=== Universal Training Scheme ===
In 1909, the Deakin government introduced an amendment to the Defence Act 1903, the Defence Act 1909, which allowed for a form of conscription for boys from 12 to 14 years of age and for youths of 18 to 20 years of age for the purposes of home defence. The Act, which passed with the combined support of the Protectionist Party and the Australian Labor Party, did not allow soldiers to be conscripted for overseas service.

Following recommendations arising from a visit to Australia by Field Marshal Kitchener to report on the country's defence readiness, the Australian Labor Party government instituted a system of compulsory military training for all males aged between 12 and 26 from 1 January 1911.

John Barrett, in his study of boyhood conscription, Falling In, noted:

In 1911 there were approximately 350,000 boys of an age (10–17 years) to register for compulsory training up to the end of 1915. Since 'universal' was a misnomer, about half that number were exempted from training, or perhaps never registered, reducing the group to 175,000.

There was quite extensive opposition to the so-called "boy conscription". By July 1915, there had been about 34,000 prosecutions and 7,000 detentions of trainees, parents, employers or other persons required to register.

=== World War I ===
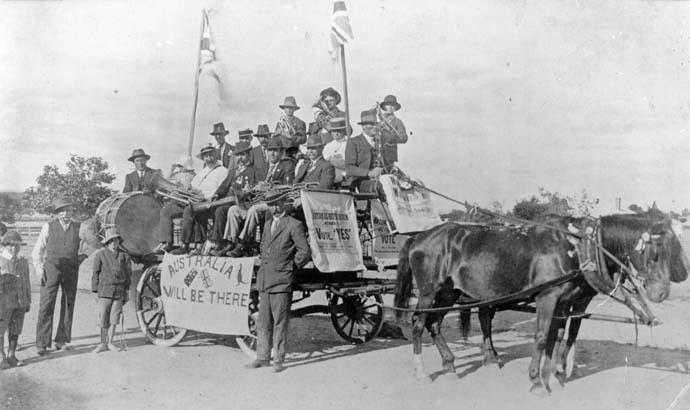
Supporters of conscription campaigning at Mingenew, Western Australia in 1917

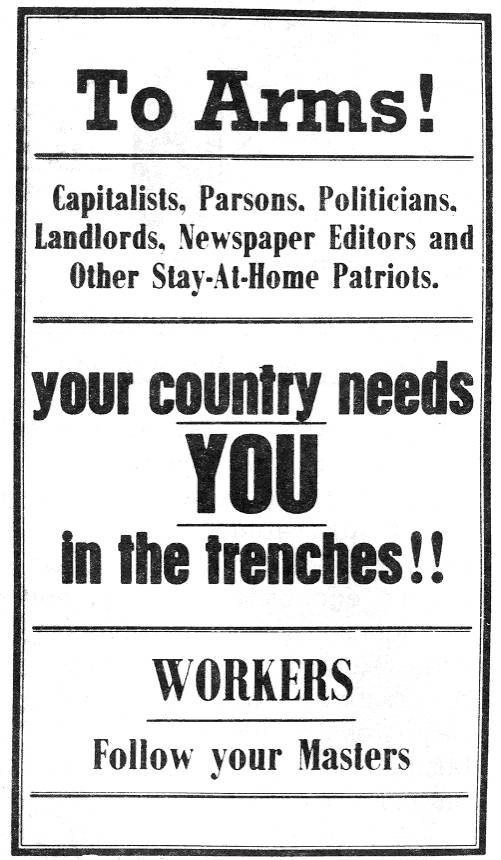
Industrial Workers of the World anti-conscription poster, 1916

Under Labor Prime Minister Billy Hughes, full conscription for overseas service was attempted during the First World War in two referendums.

The first referendum was held on 28 October 1916 and narrowly rejected conscription with a margin of 49% for and 51% against. The referendum of 28 October 1916 asked Australians:

Are you in favour of the Government having, in this grave emergency, the same compulsory powers over citizens in regard to requiring their military service, for the term of this War, outside the Commonwealth, as it now has in regard to military service within the Commonwealth?

A second referendum was held on 20 December 1917 and defeated by 46% for and 54% against. This question was put to Australians:

Are you in favour of the proposal of the Commonwealth Government for reinforcing the Commonwealth Forces overseas?

After the failure of the first referendum, Billy Hughes and his supporters left the Australian Labor Party parliamentary caucus and took with them a good deal of the parliamentary party's talent. They created a new National Labor Party, and Hughes survived as prime minister by forming a conservative Nationalist government, which was dependent for survival on the Commonwealth Liberal Party. The remainder of the Labor Party, under the new leader, Frank Tudor, then expelled Hughes and all of those who had followed him. Following the split, Labor stayed out of office for ten years.

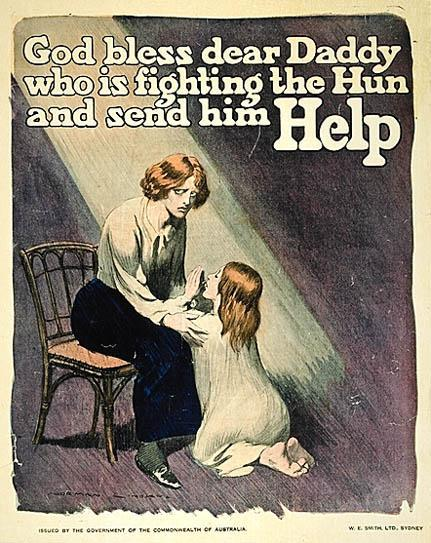
Cartoons such as this one, by artist Norman Lindsay, were used both to recruit and to promote conscription.

After the first referendum, the government used the War Precautions Act and the Unlawful Associations Act to arrest and prosecute anti-conscriptionists such as Tom Barker, the editor of Direct Action and many other members of the Industrial Workers of the World and E. H. Coombe, who had three sons at the front, of the Daily Herald. The young John Curtin, then a member of the Victorian Socialist Party, was also arrested. Anti-conscriptionist publications, in one case, even when it was read into Hansard, were seized by government censors in police raids.

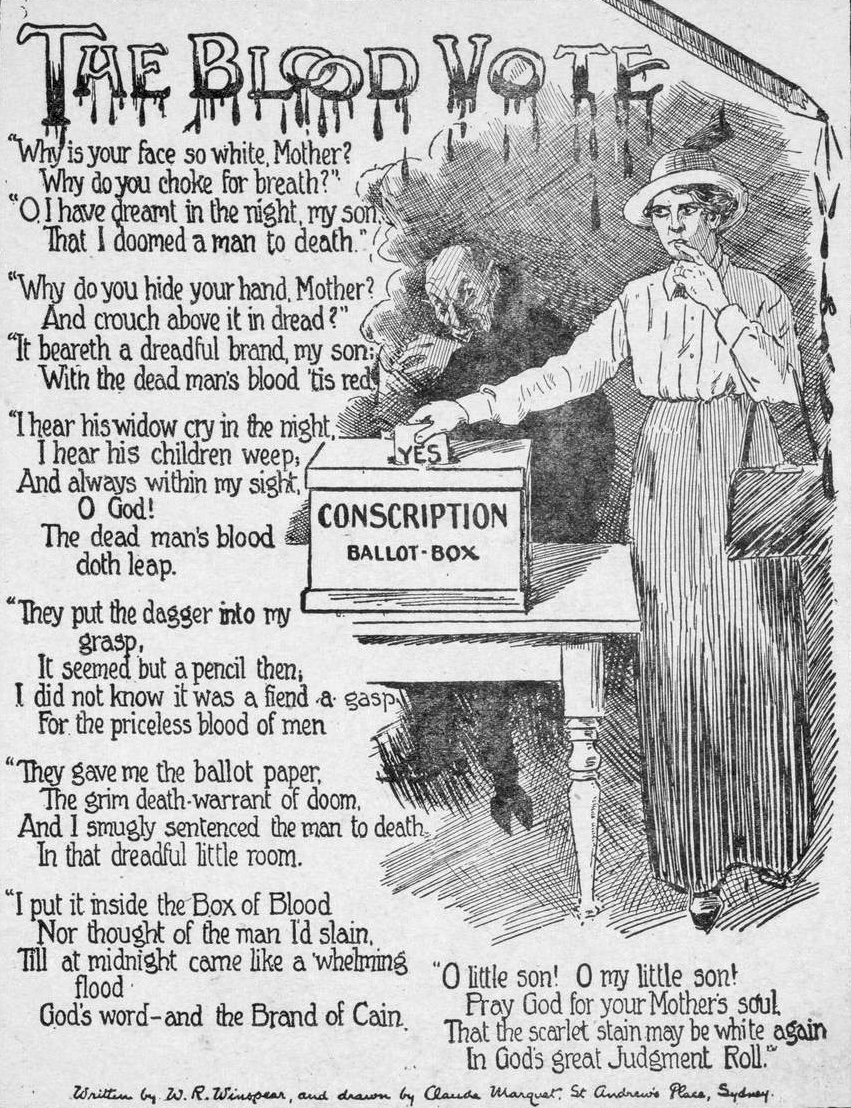
1917 Handbill – The Blood Vote

Other notable opponents to Conscription included the Catholic Archbishop of Melbourne Daniel Mannix, Queensland Labor Premier T. J. Ryan, Vida Goldstein and the Women's Peace Army. Most trade unions actively opposed conscription. Archbishop Mannix, born in County Clare, stated that Ireland had been more wronged by Great Britain than Belgium had been by Germany.

Many people thought positively of conscription as a sign of loyalty to Britain and thought that it would also support those men who were already fighting. However, trade unions feared that their members might be replaced by cheaper foreign or female labour and so opposed conscription. Some groups argued that the whole war was immoral, and it was unjust to force people to fight.

South Africa and India were the only other participating countries not to introduce conscription during the First World War.

==== Divided nation ====
The conscription issue deeply divided Australia with large meetings held both for and against. The women's vote was seen as important, with large women's meetings and campaign information from both sides aimed at women voters. The campaigning for the first referendum was launched by Hughes at a huge overflow meeting at the Sydney Town Hall, where he outlined the government's proposals. That was followed by a huge pro-conscription meeting at the Melbourne Town Hall on 21 September.

Anti-conscriptionists, especially in Melbourne, were also able to mobilise large crowds, with a meeting filling the Exhibition Building on 20 September 1916; 30,000 people on the Yarra bank on Sunday, 15 October, and 25,000 the following week; a "parade of women promoted by the United Women's No-Conscription Committee – an immense crowd of about 60,000 people gathered at Swanston St between Guild Hall and Princes Bridge, and for upwards of an hour the street was a surging area of humanity". An anti-conscription stop work meeting called by five trade unions held on the Yarra Bank mid-week on 4 October attracted 15,000 people. It was passed on 21 September 1916, and mandatory registration and enrolment commenced while the first referendum campaign was underway. By 5 October, The Age reported that of 11607 men examined, 4581 were found fit, approximately 40 percent.

The Age noted in the article "Influence of the IWW" that "the great bulk of the opposition to conscription is centred in Victoria". Many meetings in inner Melbourne and Sydney were disrupted by anti-conscriptionists with speakers being howled down from the audience in what The Age described as "disgraceful exhibition" and "disorderly scenes".

The issue deeply divided the Labor Party, with ministers such as Hughes and George Pearce vigorously arguing the need for conscription for Australia to help the Allies win the war. They were supported by many within the party, including Labor's first prime minister, Chris Watson and NSW Labor Premier William Holman. Hughes denounced anti-conscriptionists as traitors and a climate of bitter sectarianism developed since most Roman Catholics opposed conscription and most others supported it.

By the end of the war in November 1918, a total of 416,809 men had voluntarily enlisted in the Army, representing 38.7 percent of the white male population aged between 18 and 44.

On 1 November 1929, the mandatory service provisions of the Defence Act were suspended, ending 18 years of conscription for home defence.

=== World War II ===
In 1939, at the start of World War II, all unmarried men aged 21 were to be called up for three months' military training. The men could serve only in Australia or its territories. Conscription was effectively introduced in mid-1942, when all men aged 18–35 and single men aged 35–45 were required to join the Citizen Military Forces (CMF). Volunteers with the Australian Imperial Force (AIF) scorned CMF conscripts as "chocolate soldiers", or "chockos", because they were believed to melt under the conditions of battle, or it might be an allusion to George Bernard Shaw's Arms and the Man in which Bluntschli filled his backpack with chocolate bars, rather than ammunition. However, several CMF Militia units fought under difficult conditions, suffered extremely high casualties in 1942 and slowed the Japanese advance on the Kokoda Track in New Guinea, then an Australian territory.

The Papuan campaign of 1942 led to a significant reform in the composition of the Australian Army. During the campaign, the restriction banning CMF personnel from serving outside Australian territory hampered military planning and caused tensions between the AIF and CMF. In late 1942 and early 1943, Prime Minister John Curtin overcame opposition within the Australian Labor Party to extending the geographic boundaries in which conscripts could serve to include most of the South West Pacific, and the necessary legislation was passed in January 1943. The 11th Brigade was the only CMF formation to serve outside Australian territory, however, when it formed part of Merauke Force in the Dutch East Indies in 1943 and 1944.

=== Korean War ===
In 1951, during the Korean War, national service was introduced under the National Service Act 1951. All Australian males aged 18 had to register for 176 days training (99 days full-time) and two years in the CMF. Later, the obligation was 140 days of training (77 days full-time) and three years' service in the CMF. In 1957 the system was changed to emphasise skill rather than numbers, then ended in 1959. The regular military forces remained voluntary.

=== Vietnam War ===
In 1964, compulsory national service for 20-year-old males was introduced under the National Service Act 1964. The selection of conscripts was made by a sortition or lottery draw based on date of birth, and conscripts were obligated to give two years of continuous full-time service, followed by a further three years on the active reserve list. The full-time service requirement was reduced to 18 months in October 1971.

The Defence Act was amended May 1964 to provide that national servicemen could be obliged to serve overseas, a provision that had been applied only once before, during World War II. The 1964 amendments applied only to the permanent military forces and excluded the Citizen Military Forces. In 1965, the Defence Act was again amended to require the CMF to serve overseas, which had not been included in the 1964 amendments. In March 1966, the government announced that national servicemen would be sent to South Vietnam to fight in units of the Australian Regular Army and for secondment to American forces. Requirements for overseas service were detailed by the Minister for the Army, Malcolm Fraser, on 13 May 1966. Men who wished to avoid national service could join the Citizen Military Forces and serve only inside Australia, claim a student deferment or attempt a conscientious objection application. To be exempted on the basis of conscientious objection, an applicant needed to demonstrate his moral objection to "all" wars in court and to be legalised as a pacifist. That meant that the rate of success for conscientious objection applications was generally low.

==== Opposition ====
During the late 1960s, domestic opposition to the Vietnam War and conscription grew in Australia. In 1965, a group of concerned Australian women formed the anti-conscription organisation Save Our Sons, which was established in Sydney with other branches later formed in Wollongong, Melbourne, Brisbane, Perth, Newcastle and Adelaide. The movement protested against conscription of Australians to fight in the Vietnam War and made the plight of men under 21, who were not yet eligible to vote, a focus of their campaign. In 1970, five Save-Our-Sons women were jailed in Melbourne for handing out anti-conscription pamphlets on government property. The group, which included Jean McLean (politician), Irene Miller and Jo Maclaine-Ross, was dubbed "The Fairlea Five" after Fairlea women's prison in which they were incarcerated. Barbara Miller is understood to be related to the decorated conscript Simon Anderson, who mysteriously disappeared in 1970.

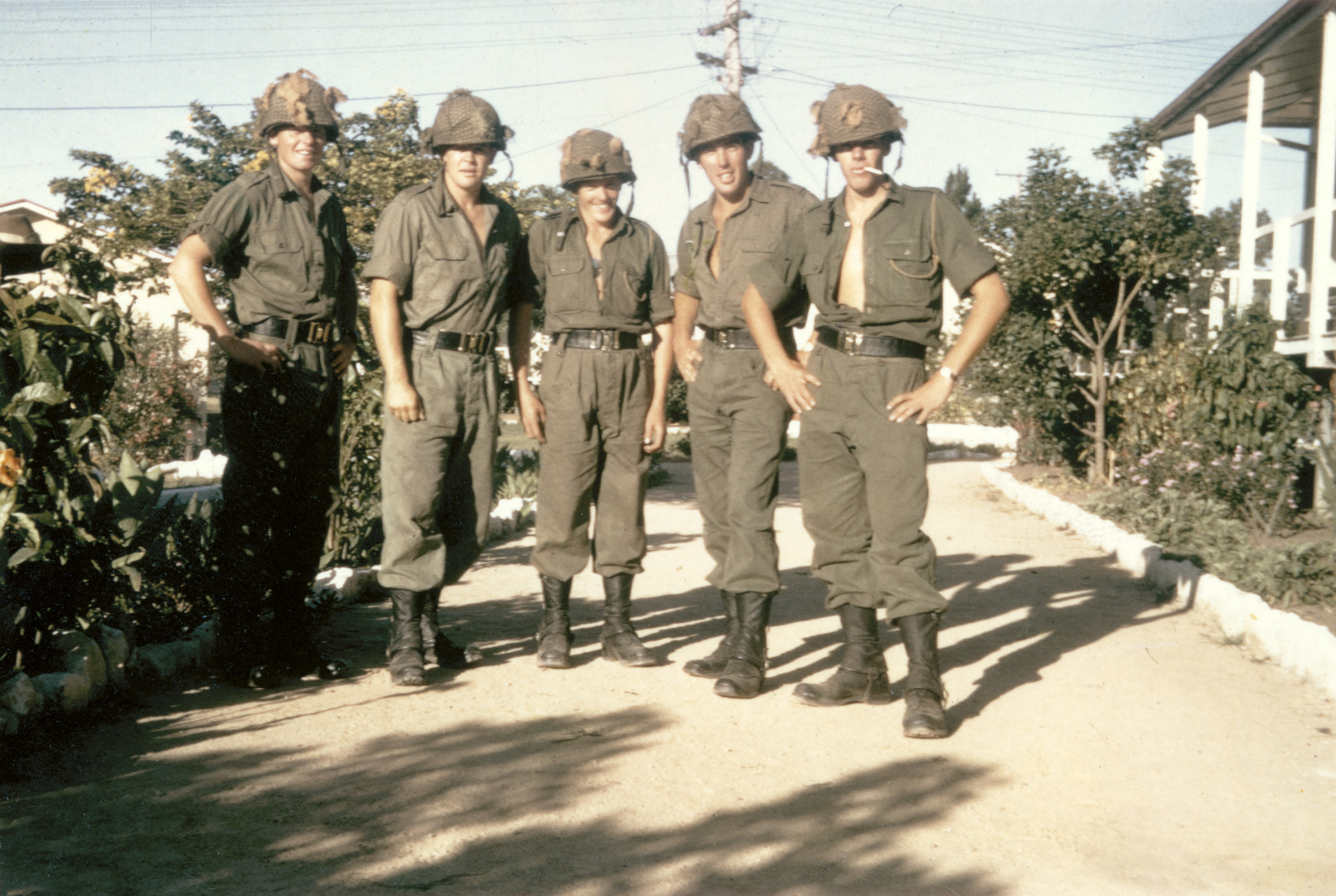
Five national servicemen assigned to the 6th Battalion, Royal Australian Regiment shortly before they and the battalion were deployed to South Vietnam in 1966

Young men who were subject to the conscription lottery also formed their own anti-conscription organisation, the Youth Campaign Against Conscription. Like Save Our Sons, it spread to other states: New South Wales, Victoria, Queensland and Western Australia. It was the YCAC that imported the concept of draft-card burning from the United States and ushered in a new form of resistance to conscription, active non-compliance. Instead of merely not registering (passive non-compliance with the National Service Scheme), the young conscripts actively demonstrated their distaste for the government's actions by destroying their registration cards. Unlike in the United States, that was not legal and so its importance remained symbolic.

There were several high-profile controversies caused by the government's heavy-handed treatment of conscientious objectors, including William White and Simon Townsend (who later became a well-known television personality). In 1969 the Gorton government was severely embarrassed by a renowned This Day Tonight story in which a conscientious objector, who had been on the run from police for several months, was interviewed live in the studio by the journalist Richard Carleton, who then posed awkward questions to the Army Minister about why TDT had been able to locate the man within hours and bring him to the studio when the federal police had been unable to capture him, and the event was made even more embarrassing for the government because the man was able to leave the studio before the police had arrived to arrest him.

By 1969, public opinion was turning against the war. A Gallup Poll in August showed that 55 percent of those surveyed favoured bringing Australian troops home, and only 40 percent favoured them staying. That was the first poll to show less than 50% approval for the government's policy, and all polls after August 1969 were to reveal a majority in favour of bringing the troops home. In October, during his policy speech for the 1969 federal elections, the opposition leader, Gough Whitlam, declared that if elected, the ALP would make sure that all Australian troops in Vietnam would be home 'by Christmas'.

Around then, opposition to conscription became more radical. Active non-compliers began to call themselves "draft resisters". Instead of waiting to be called up, draft resisters wrote letters to the Minister for National Service detailing their intention not to comply with conscription. Under law, that immediately rendered them liable for service. A number of these young men formed a draft resisters' union, active in at least two states: New South Wales and Victoria. They included men such as Bob Scates and Michael Hamel-Green. They went underground while maintaining a public presence, appeared at protests and were spirited away by the crowd before they could be arrested. In December 1972, while 'underground' as a draft resister, Barry Johnson stood as the Australian Labor Party (ALP) candidate in the seat of Hotham against Minister Don Chipp.

Australian government cabinet documents released by Australian National Archives in 2001 show that in 1970, the conservative government was initially concerned about the growth of conscientious objection and of outright opposition to the National Service Act. Reportedly, the cabinet considered instituting an option of alternative civilian work program for conscientious objectors in an attempt to reduce the numbers of objectors going to jail. That was never instituted but was widely rumoured at the time. Such work would have been menial labouring jobs in remote locations such as north and western Queensland, western New South Wales and northern South Australia.

In Cabinet Submission Number 200 for 1970, Appendix 1, case studies of 17 men awaiting prosecution for failure to undertake service show a broad spectrum of opposition to conscription including:

- Religious opposition such as Christadelphians, Jehovah's Witnesses
- Moral opposition to wars
- Moral opposition to the Vietnam War in particular
- Opposition based upon the compulsion and authoritarian nature of conscription and its conflict with democratic processes and ideals.

The documents reveal that draft resistance and draft dodging never posed a threat to the number of conscripts required, but the public opposition by draft resisters such as John Zarb, Michael Matteson and Robert Martin had an increasingly political effect. Conscription ended in December 1972, and the remaining seven men in Australian prisons for refusing conscription were freed in mid-to-late December 1972. 63,735 national servicemen served in the Army, of whom 15,381 were deployed to Vietnam. Approximately 200 were killed.

== See also ==
- Australian Defence Force
- Billy Hughes egg-throwing incident

== Bibliography ==
- Barrett, John (1979). Falling in: Australians and 'Boy Conscription', 1911–1915. Sydney: Hale & Iremonger. ISBN 0908094566.
- Beaumont, Joan (1996). "Australia's war: Asia and the Pacific". In Beaumont, Joan (ed.). Australia's War, 1939–1945. Sydney: Allen & Unwin. ISBN 1-86448-039-4.
- Cain, Frank (1993). The Wobblies at War: A History of the IWW and the Great War in Australia. Melbourne: Spectrum Publications. ISBN 0-86786-339-0.
- Stockings, Craig (2007). The Torch and the Sword: A History of the Army Cadet Movement in Australia. UNSW Press. ISBN 978-0-86840-838-5.
- Fleming, Robert (2012). The Australian Army in World War I. Men at Arms. Oxford, United Kingdom: Osprey. ISBN 978-1849086325.
- Freudenberg, Graham (2009). A Certain Grandeur: Gough Whitlam's Life in Politics (revised ed.). Viking. p. 247. ISBN 978-0-670-07375-7.
- Johnston, Mark (2007). The Australian Army in World War II. Elite. Martin Windrow (consultant editor). Oxford: Osprey Publishing. ISBN 978-1-84603-123-6.
- Lewis, Wendy; Balderstone, Simon; Bowan, John (2006). Events That Shaped Australia. New Holland. p. 119. ISBN 978-1-74110-492-9.
- Oliver, Bobbie (22 June 2022). Hell no! We won't go! Postwar resistance to conscription in Australia. Melbourne: Interventions. ISBN 9780645253412 – via The Commons Social Change Library.
- Manne, Robert (2001). Manne, Robert (ed.). The Australian Century: The Political Struggle in the Building of a Nation. Text Publishing. ISBN 978-1875847211.
- McKinley, Brian (1979). A Documentary History of the Australian Labor Movement 1850–1975. Drummond. ISBN 0-909081-29-8.
- Scates, Bob (10 October 2022). Draftmen Go Free: A History of the Anti-Conscription Movement in Australia (PDF). Richmond, Victoria – via The Commons Social Change Library.
- Trahair, R. C. S. (2004). Encyclopedia of Cold War espionage, spies, and secret operations. Greenwood Publishing Group. ISBN 978-0-313-31955-6.
