= John Zarb =

Australian conscientious objector

John Zarb was an Australian conscientious objector to military service (conscription) during the Vietnam War. Objecting to the principle of forced drafting for military purposes under the National Service Act (1964), Zarb refused to nominate for conscription. Zarb is of Maltese heritage.

On 14 October 1968, John Zarb, 21, was the first person to be found guilty of having failed to comply with his call-up notice during the Vietnam War. He was convicted in Melbourne and sentenced to two years' jail. He lost his appeal to the full High Court on 25 November 1968 but was released on compassionate grounds in August 1969 after serving 10 months and 7 days in Pentridge Prison.

Zarb's gaoling created a great deal of public opposition to conscription. As a postman, Zarb received support from his trade union, the Amalgamated Postal Workers Union (APWU). General Secretary George Slater, stated:

John Zarb is a political prisoner, gaoled by fascists. He refuses to take part in the murder of people who have done him no harm. He upholds the Christian principle of 'thou shalt not kill'.

Thirty-four Victorian union officials demanded Zarb's immediate release. Protests against his gaoling were often in the newspaper headlines of the time.
