= Robert Martin (anti-war activist) =

Australian historian (born 1949)

Robert Martin (born 1949) is an Australian historian who resisted conscription for military service during the Vietnam War.

Martin refused to register for conscription, holding an objection to the Vietnam War in particular. In late 1971 he was sentenced to one week in Adelaide Gaol as a conscientious non-complier with the National Service Act, and in February 1972 he was sentenced to eighteen months for refusing to report at Keswick Barracks. He was released by the Whitlam Duumvirate in December 1972 having served ten months – one of seven men in Australian prisons for refusing conscription freed at that time.
