= Sydney Elliott Napier =

Australian writer and poet

- Born: 26 December 1870; Sydney
- Died: 3 May 1940 (aged 69); Chatswood, New South Wales
- Education: Newington College; University of Sydney
- Occupations: Writer and poet
- Spouse(s): 1900, Cathrine, née Armstrong
- Children: Three sons: Francis Armstrong; Andrew Maxwell; Colin Elliott
- Parent(s): Francis and Emma Mary, née Elliott

Sydney Elliott Napier (26 December 1870 – 3 May 1940), who wrote as S. Elliott Napier, was an Australian writer and poet.

== Early life ==
Napier was born in Sydney and educated at Newington College (1882–1887) and Sydney University.

== Working life ==
He began his working life as a bank clerk with the AJS Bank in Burwood, New South Wales. From 1893 he was a jackeroo in Manilla, New South Wales, until he was articled to a solicitor in Tamworth in 1894. After 1899 he worked as a solicitor in Sydney and the Riverina.

== Armed service ==
During World War I, Napier served with the 41st Battalion of the AIF as a sergeant. After the end of the war he served on the AIF Courts Martial Staff in Tidworth in England, then returned to Australia in 1921 to work as Legal Officer for the New South Wales War Service Homes Commission.

== Journalism ==
In 1925, Napier joined The Sydney Morning Herald. He subsequently became assistant editor of The Sydney Mail and leader-writer of the Sydney Morning Herald where in 1931 he compiled, with P. S. Allen, A Century of Journalism: The Sydney Morning Herald and Its Record of Australian Life 1831–1931. He contributed prose and verse to numerous English and Australian journals and newspapers, and published a collection of essays, The Magic Carpet in 1932.

== Personal life ==
Napier married Cathrine Armstrong in Sydney in December 1900. They had three sons, Francis Armstrong, Andrew Maxwell, and Colin Elliott. She predeceased him.

== Publications ==
- The Sydney Repertory Theatre: its history and significance; a criticism [Sydney: Sydney Repertory Theatre Society, 1927]
- On the Barrier Reef: Notes from a no-ologist's pocket-book [Sydney: Angus & Robertson, 1928]
- Walks abroad: Being the record of the experiences of two Australians in the wilds of the United Kingdom [Sydney: Angus & Robertson, 1929]
- Potted biographies [Sydney: Dymocks Book Arcade, 1930]
- The magic carpet and other essays and adventures [Sydney: Angus & Robertson, 1932]
- On the Barrier Reef: a story of Australia's coral wonderland [Sydney : Angus & Robertson, 1932]
- Walks abroad: Two Australians in the wilds of England, Scotland and Ireland [Sydney: Angus & Robertson, 1933]
- The book of the Anzac memorial, New South Wales [Sydney, 1934]
- Great lovers [Sydney: Angus & Robertson, 1934]
- Underneath the bough: a book of verses [Sydney: Penfold, 1937]
- The genesis and growth of solicitors' associations in New South Wales: Together with a brief history of the Incorporated Law Institute of New South Wales [Sydney: Law Book Co., 1937]
- Men and cities: Being the journeyings of a journalist [Sydney: Angus & Robertson, 1938]

== Poetry ==
- Salute

YOU who have lov'd will remember
The sound of their farewell cheers
Soothing, but never arresting,
The march of your natural fears:
You who have lov'd will remember
The glow of their glad young years,
As you stand to-day to salute them —
In silence, with pride and with tears.

Out of the peace of the dawning
Into a fury of flame,
Up thro' the Valley of Shadow
To the light of the world they came,
And bright on the roll of the nations,
Broad on the banner of fame,
With the opulent blood of their youth-time
They painted Australia's name.

You who have lov'd, remember:
Tho' these whom you lov'd have died,
Tho' the wearying years move onward
And the ways of the world are wide;
Tho' Gallipoli's graves may hold them
And her whispering waters hide,
The years have no power to part you,
Nor the width of the world to divide;
And to-day, as you stand to salute them,
They, too, will be here, at your side!

- All Men Are Free

ALL men are free and equal born
Before the Law!’ So runs the worn
And specious, lying, parrot-cry.
All men are free—to starve or sigh;
But few to feed on Egypt's corn.

There toils the sweated slave, forlorn;
There weeps the babe with hunger torn;
Dear God! Forgive us for the lie—
All men are free!

That man may laugh while this must mourn;
One's heir to honour, one to scorn—
Were they born free? Were you? Was I?
No! Not when born, but when they die
And of their robes—or rags—are shorn,
All men are free!

- France

OH, golden-lilied Queen—immortal France!
Thou heritress of storied name and deed,
As thou hast pluck’d, so oft, from cumb’ring weed
The fragrant flow’rs of Freedom and Romance,
So shalt thou seize to-day the fateful chance
That comes to thee in this thy hour of need,
When once again thy sacred frontiers bleed
Beneath the thrust of the Invader’s lance.
For, with the hour, hath also come again
The pure and splendid spirit of the Maid
To nerve they sons and wipe away thy tears,
Till, sanctified by Sorrow, purged by pain,
Thou shalt arise, unfettered, unafraid,
And walk in honour down the deathless years.

- Russia

IMPLACABLE as are thy arctic floes;
Grim and gigantic as thy mountain height;
Girt with thy pines for spindles and the light
Of pale auroras for thy stars; to those
Who know thee not thou seem’st as one who goes
Unvex’d by Wrong, nor swerves to help the Right,
A grey Lachesis of the Northern night,
Stark as thy steppes and colder than thy snows.

But we—we know thee now, Ally and Friend!
True as thy Baltic Spars and tried by fire,
Thy seeming coldness hides a courage high,
A stern resolve to do, endure and die,
So that the holy cause of thy desire—
Thy cause and ours—shall triumph in the end.

- Mater Dolorosa

JUST as of yore the friendly rain
Patters its old and frank refrain;
Just as of yore the world swings by
The little window where I lie
Watching the shadows wax and wane.

I see, beyond the Aegean main,
His cross upon the grave-scarred plain—
Yet still the dawn-flush climbs the sky,
Just as of yore!

His cross—and mine! They try in vain
With careful phrase to stanch the pain;
They say, ‘A hero's death!’ But I
Long only for his footstep nigh;
Long only for my boy again,
Just as of yore!

== Use of Napier's work ==
At the Sydney Dawn Service in 2014 the poem "Salute" was recited by the Minister for Veterans Affairs, Victor Dominello. In 2019 the poem was recited by the Premier of New South Wales, Gladys Berejiklian. Again in 2021 Berejiklian read Salute. At the 2024 service The Premier of NSW Chris Minns read the poem.
