= The Sydney Mail =

Former Australian newspaper

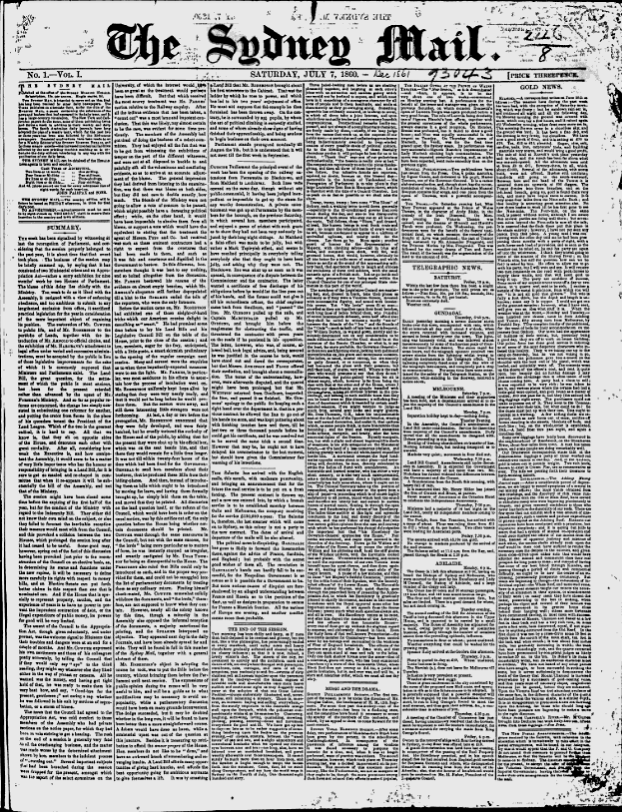
Front page of the Sydney Mail on 7 July 1860

The Sydney Mail was an Australian magazine published weekly in Sydney. It was the weekly edition of The Sydney Morning Herald newspaper and ran from 1860 to 1938.

== History ==
The Sydney Mail was first published on 17 July 1860 by John Fairfax and Sons. In 1871 the magazine was renamed for the first time, and it was published as The Sydney Mail and New South Wales Advertiser from 1871 to 1912. In 1912 it reverted to its original name, The Sydney Mail, and was published under this masthead until 28 December 1938 when the magazine ceased publication. It was published on a weekly basis and became known for its illustrations.

=== Earlier titles ===
The Sydney Mail had absorbed another John Fairfax publication when it began in 1860, the Shipping Gazette and Sydney General Trade List, which was first published in 1844 by Charles Kemp and John Fairfax and at that time absorbed the Sydney General Trade List. This was the final title of the List, which began publication as the Sydney General Trade List in 1828. It changed title in 1829 to the Sydney General Trade List, and Mercantile Advertiser, in 1830 to the Sydney General Trade List, Mercantile Chronicle and Advertiser, and finally in 1834 to the Sydney General Trade List.

== Digitisation ==
The various titles of the paper have been digitised as part of the Australian Newspapers Digitisation Program of the National Library of Australia.

== Personnel ==
Notable people employed by or contributing to The Sydney Mail include:

- Gerard Krefft, Curator of the Australian Museum. contributor of more than 150 "Natural History" articles from 4 March 1871 until 26 June 1875 (see: List of Natural History articles by Gerard Krefft in The Sydney Mail).
- Hall Thorpe, principal artist (1897–1900)
- Mrs Carl Fischer, music and theatre critic, women's columnist (1880–1896)
- Ella McFadyen, contributor of short stories novella, and poetry; conducted The Children's Page 1920 to 1938
- Sydney Elliott Napier, assistant editor (1930s)

== Works originally published ==
- Robbery Under Arms - serialised novel by Rolf Boldrewood July 1882—August 1883
- "Jack's Last Muster" - poem by Barcroft Boake 13 December 1890
- "Mulga Bill's Bicycle" - poem by Banjo Paterson 25 July 1896
- "Salute" – poem by Sydney Elliott Napier 21 April 1937
