= Salute (poem) =

Poem by Sydney Elliott Napier

"Salute" is a poem by the Australian writer Sydney Elliott Napier. During World War I he served with the First Australian Imperial Force. The poem was written when Napier was assistant editor of The Sydney Mail and was first published in that paper on 21 April 1937.

== Use of the poem ==
In 2014 "Salute" was recited at the Dawn Service at the Sydney Cenotaph in Martin Place by the Minister for Veterans Affairs, Victor Dominello. In 2019 the poem was recited by the Premier of New South Wales, Gladys Berejiklian. In 2024 Premier Chris Minns recited the poem.

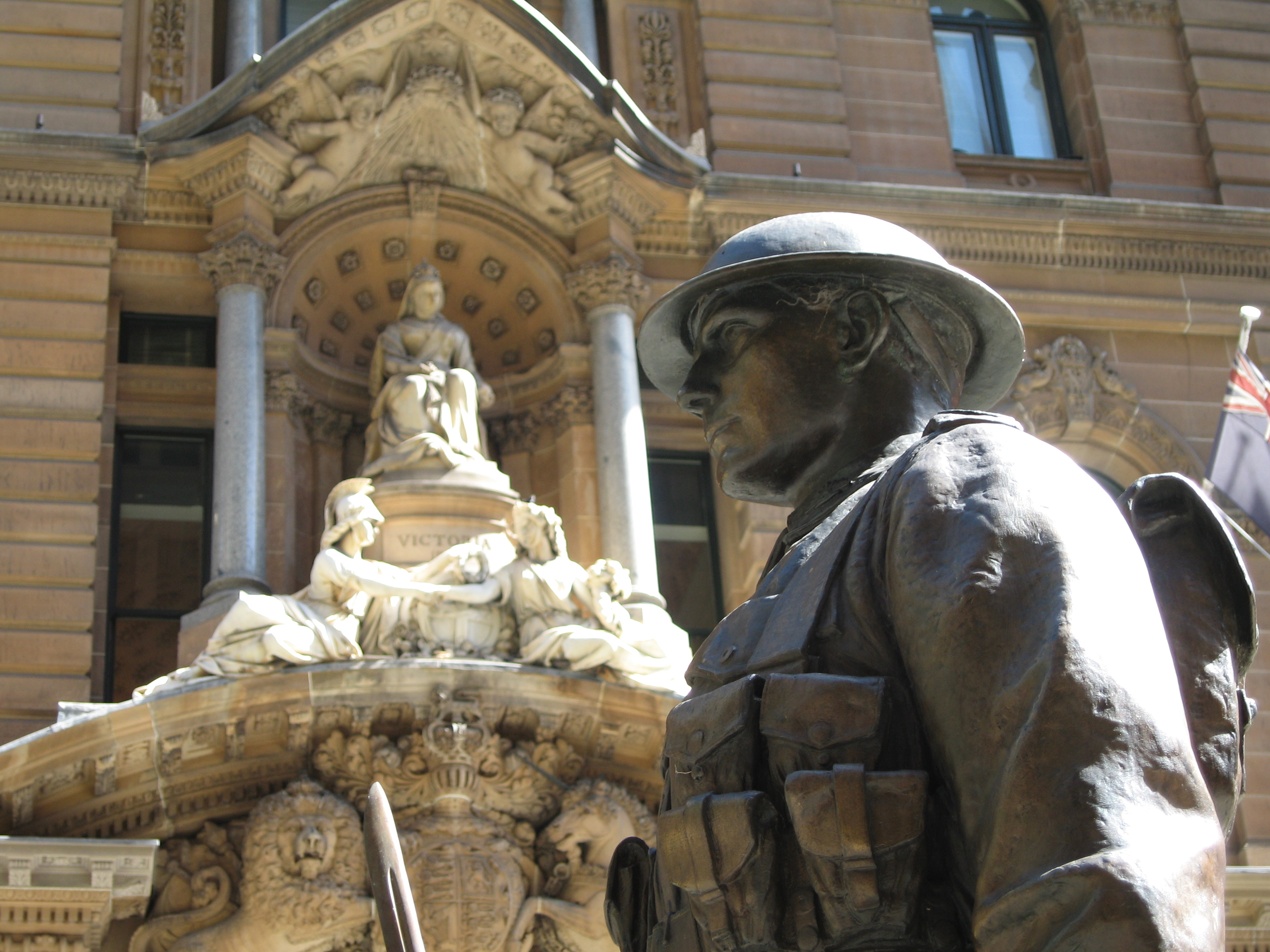
Soldier statue on the Sydney Cenotaph where "Salute" has been recited at each Dawn Service since 2014.
