= William White (conscientious objector) =

Australian school teacher

William "Bill" White was a Sydney school teacher during the Vietnam War. In July 1966, White defied a notice to report for duty at an army induction centre. White was the first Australian to be a public conscientious objector to the Vietnam War. Both this initial application for total exemption and subsequent appeals were rejected. White was removed from his classroom and ordered to report to Army quarters at Watsons Bay. He refused to comply and waited at home for the authorities to make the next move.

This standoff lasted for several days and gained wide press coverage causing considerable embarrassment for the Australian Government. The standoff ended when White was dragged from his home after refusing to comply with an order to enter the army. A photo of this event became a potent symbol of the nature of conscription.

He was jailed just before the 1966 election, and continued to seek conscientious objector status until he eventually succeeded on 23 December 1966.

White's main objection was that he felt he was being asked to kill other human beings. However, he also had objections to the war itself and to conscription.

== Quote ==
Firstly, I am standing against killing - the taking of human life... Morality, to me, is based on the respect for life. I respect people, I respect their feelings, I respect their property and I respect their equality, on the basic conscientious assumption that they have, as I have, the unquestionable right to live.

Secondly, I am standing against the war itself as a national and international policy. As war, by definition, has always incorporated killing, I would have been opposed to any war on this basis.

On the third front I am opposed to a state's right to conscript a person, I believe very strongly in democracy and democratic ideals—and I believe that it is in the area of the State's right over the life of the individual that the difference lies between totalitarian and democratic government. My opposition to conscription, of course, is intensified greatly when the conscription is for military purposes. In fact the National Service Act is the embodiment of what I consider to be morally wrong and, no matter, what the consequences, I will never fulfil the terms of the act.

It was these words that contributed to the memorable Moratorium Marches of 1970.

== Song ==
- Bill White or The ballad of Bill White, with guitar, original song about Vietnam War, by Glen Tomasetti, 1967.
