= Save Our Sons =

Australian anti war movement

Save Our Sons (SOS)
- Date: 1965–1972
- Location: Australia
- Cause: Anti Conscription & Anti war movement
- Organized by: Joyce Golgerth

Save Our Sons (SOS) was an Australian primarily women's Decentralised social anti war movement opposing national service and Australia's involvement in the Vietnam War.

== Formation ==
Originally created in response to the implementation of the National Service Act of 1964 requiring that 20-year-old males to serve in the Army for a period of twenty-four months of continuous service (reduced to eighteen months in 1971) followed by three years in the Reserve. The Defence Act 1965 amended the Defence Act 1903 in May 1965 to provide that conscripts could be obliged to serve overseas, and in March 1966 Prime Minister Harold Holt announced that National Servicemen would be sent to Vietnam to fight in units of the Australian Regular Army. At the outbreak of the Vietnam War the national service act lead to the deployment of conscripts. In October 1964 Joyce Golgerth began contacting mothers of conscription-age sons, leading to the formation of a Sydney group that was later joined by fifteen women. Other branches of SOS were soon established across Australia; in Victoria the convenor from 1965 to 1973 was Jean McLean. In 1972 under the Whitlam government conscription was ended and Australian troops withdrew from Vietnam.

== Legacy ==
The Save our Sons movement successfully contributed to a change of public opinion against the Vietnam war leading to the eventual election of the anti war Whitlam government and the end of the war.
