= June Wright =

Australian writer

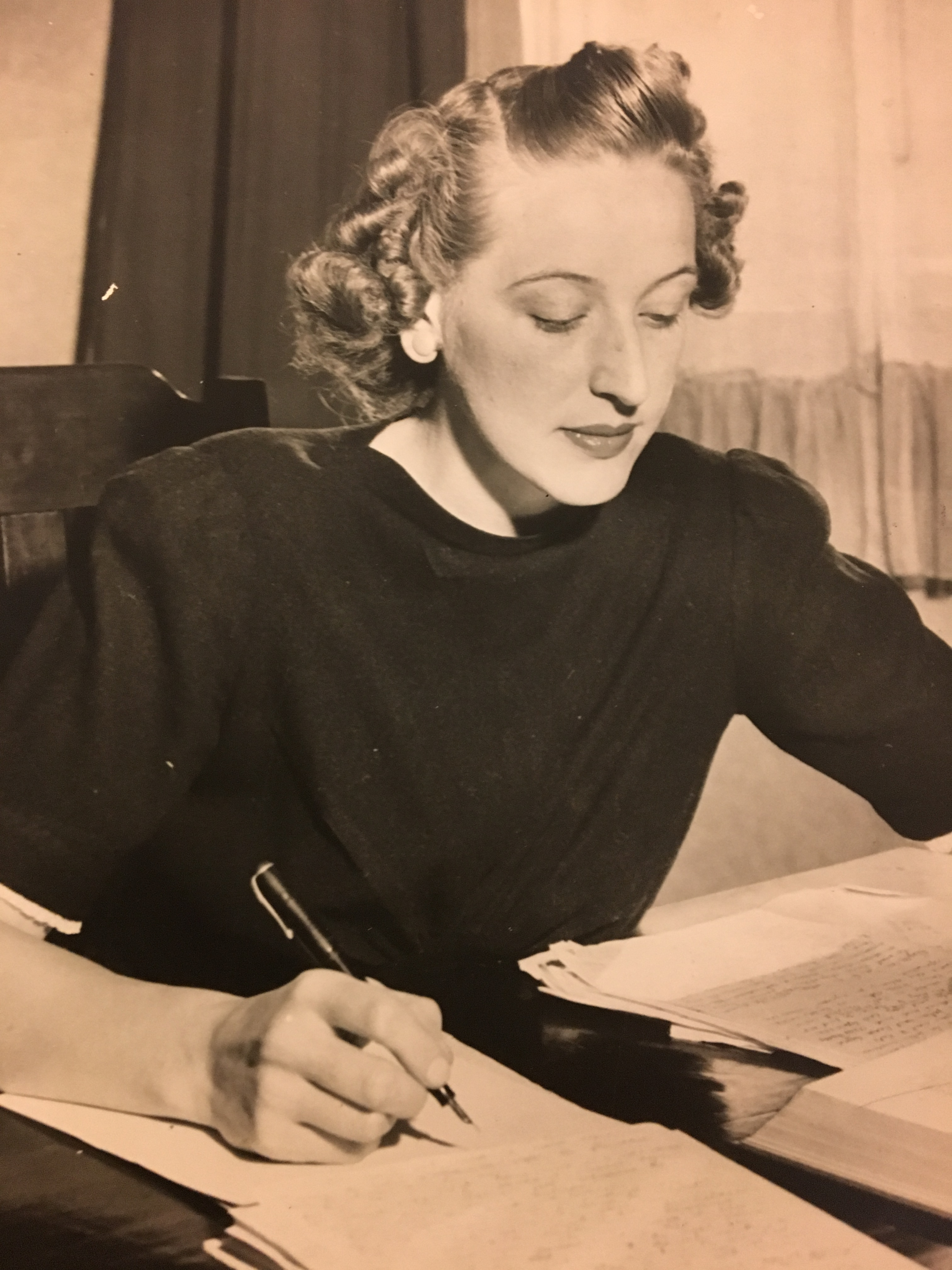
- June Wright at work, 1952
- Born: Dorothy June Healy; 29 June 1919; Malvern, Victoria
- Died: 4 February 2012 (aged 92)
- Occupation: writer
- Years active: 1948-1997
- Spouse: Stewart Wright
- Children: Patrick Wright; Rosemary Wright; Nicholas Wright; Anthony Wright; Brenda Wright; Stephen Wright

Dorothy June Wright (née Healy; 29 June 1919 – 4 February 2012) was an Australian writer. She wrote six popular crime novels between 1948 and 1966, all with recognisable settings in and around Melbourne. She also wrote many articles for Catholic lay journals such as The Majellan, Caritas and Scapular and the Catholic newspaper The Advocate. She recorded her personal memoirs and family history in two volumes in 1994 and 1997.

== Early life and education ==
Wright was born in 1919 in Malvern, Victoria and educated at Malvern's Kildara College, Loreto Mandeville Hall, in Toorak. After leaving school, she briefly studied commercial art at Melbourne Technical School before working as a telephonist at the Central Telephone Exchange in Lonsdale Street, Melbourne, which formed the basis of her first novel Murder in the Telephone Exchange. In 1941 she married Stewart Wright, an accountant. They had six children: Patrick, Rosemary, Nicholas, Anthony, Brenda and Stephen.

== Bibliography ==
=== Novels ===
- June Wright (1953). The Devil's Caress. Hutchinson and Co. Publishers Ltd. Reprinted 2018 by Dark Passage/Verse Chorus Press with an introduction by Wendy Lewis. ISBN 978-1-891241-43-7.

Maggie Byrnes series

- June Wright (1948). Murder in the Telephone Exchange. Hutchinson and Co. Publishers Ltd.. Reprinted 2014 by Dark Passage/Verse Chorus Press with an introduction by Derham Groves, ISBN 978-1-891241-37-6.
- June Wright (1949). So Bad a Death. Hutchinson and Co. Publishers Ltd. Reprinted 2015 by Dark Passage/Verse Chorus Press with an introduction by Lucy Sussex, ISBN 978-1-891241-45-1.

Mother Paul series

- June Wright (1958). Reservation for Murder. John Long. Reprinted 1970 by Fleetways Library as Black Tulip Thriller Romances No 23. Reprinted 2020 by Dark Passage/Verse Chorus Press with an introduction by Derham Groves, ISBN 978-1-891241-40-6.
- June Wright (1961). Faculty of Murder. John Long. Reprinted 2022 by Dark Passage/Verse Chorus Press with an introduction by Lucy Sussex, ISBN 978-1-891241-41-3.
- June Wright (1966). Make-up for Murder. John Long, London.
- June Wright (2015). Duck Season Death. Dark Passage/Verse Chorus Press. ISBN 978-1-891241-35-2. With an introduction by Derham Groves (previously unpublished).

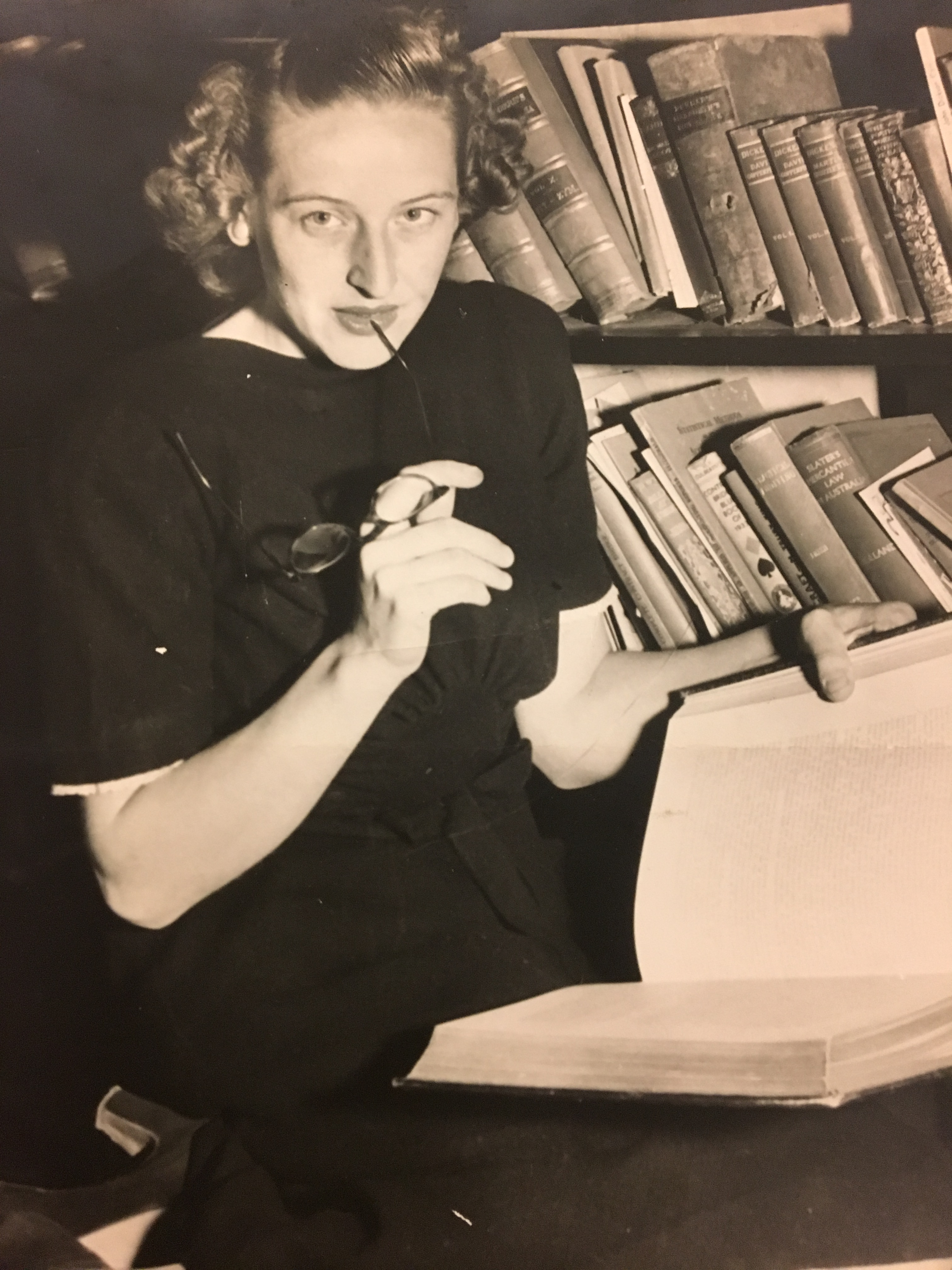
Australian author June Wright at work in her library, 1952

=== Short stories ===
- June Wright (1954). Mother Paul Investigates. Included in the reprint edition of Reservation for Murder (2020).

=== Non-fiction writings ===
- June Wright (1994). The Eagle and the Stag. ISBN 0-646-235-710. An account of the results of June's researches of her forebears.
- June Wright (1997). Remembering Melbourne. ISBN 0-646-316-001. A personal memoir.

=== Collections of writings ===
- Wright, Patrick (2014). The Collected Works of June Wright: Volume 1 & 2 Crime Fiction. ISBN 978-0-9924729-0-0. Melbourne: The Estate of Dorothy June Wright (hardback)
- Wright, Patrick (2014). The Collected Works of June Wright: Volume 3-5, Non-Fiction. ISBN 978-0-9924729-1-7. Melbourne: The Estate of Dorothy June Wright (hardback)

== Adaptations ==
June Wright's novel, The Devil's Caress was adapted for stage by Wendy Lewis and premiered in Sydney in March 2018.

== June Wright in popular culture ==
Wright's work featured in the Baillieu Library Exhibition, Murderous Melbourne: A Celebration of Australian Crime Fiction and Place, The University of Melbourne (10 June to 7 September 2008). The exhibition involved architecture students designing new dust jackets for Wright's book Faculty of Murder.

Her books also feature in Highlights and Lowlifes (29 June to 31 August 2015), an exhibition on the Holdings in the Australian Detective Fiction Collection at Fisher Library, The University of Sydney which showcased 19th century crime writers such as Fergus Hume (“Mystery of a Hansom Cab”); the early Boney novels of Arthur Upfield; and Australia's under recognised female crime writers such as Ellen Davitt and Mary Fortune through to the 20th century's Pat Flower, Pat Carlon, Margot Neville and June Wright.
