= Jena Woodhouse =

Australian poet and novelist (born 1949)

- Born: 1949 (age 76–77); Rockhampton, Australia
- Education: University of Queensland; Queensland University of Technology
- Occupations: Novelist and poet

Jena Woodhouse (born 1949) is a Brisbane-based Australian novelist and poet.

== Career ==
Born Jennifer May Spurway, in Rockhampton, Australia, in 1949, Woodhouse is a graduate of the University of Queensland obtaining a B.A. Hons degree in Russian language and literature. Later, Woodhouse completed an M.A. in creative writing at Queensland University of Technology. AustLit lists 562 published works by Woodhouse that include the domestic fiction Farming Ghosts (2009), and the short story collection Dreams of Flight (2014).

Woodhouse's published poetry collections include Eros in Landscape (1989), Passenger on a Ferry (1994) and Green Dance: Tamborine Mountain Poems (2018).

Woodhouse's poetry has been recognised both in Australia and internationally. Among Woodhouse's awards is a High Commendation for "The Termitary" in the 2007 Fellowship of Australian Writers Tom Collins Poetry Prize (Western Australia) and second place for "Galahs near Booranga" in the 2017 Henry Kendall Poetry Award (Victoria). Woodhouse has been shortlisted three times for the Montreal International Poetry Prize for A Bird and the River (2013), Evening Stroll by the Canal (2015), and more recently for Lament for a Daughter (2020).

Woodhouse's poems have also been set to music. Woodhouse's poem sequence "The River" formed the basis of Betty Beath’s song cycle River Songs (1991) for soprano and her poems "Turquoise Lullaby", "Every Shadow" and "When Evie Dances" (2018) forms the text for Beath's song cycle Evie Dances for mezzo-soprano. Woodhouse's poem "The She Wolf" is the text of one of five songs in Beath's song cycle Points in a Journey (1987) for soprano.

== Prose ==
- Jena Woodhouse (1993), Metis, The Octopus and the Olive Tree, Nundah: Jam Roll Press.
- Christina Houen and Jena Woodhouse (eds) (2006), Hidden Desires: Australian Women Writing, Ginninderra Press.
- Jena Woodhouse (2009), Farming Ghosts, Port Adelaide: Ginninderra Press.

== Poetry ==
- Jena Woodhouse, Larisa Chen (illustrator) (1989), Eros in Landscape, Brisbane: Jacaranda Press.
- Jena Woodhouse (1994), Passenger on a Ferry, St Lucia: University of Queensland Press.
- Jena Woodhouse (2018), Green Dance: Tamborine Mountain Poems Calanthe Press.
