= Ella McFadyen =

Australian children's novelist, poet and short story writer

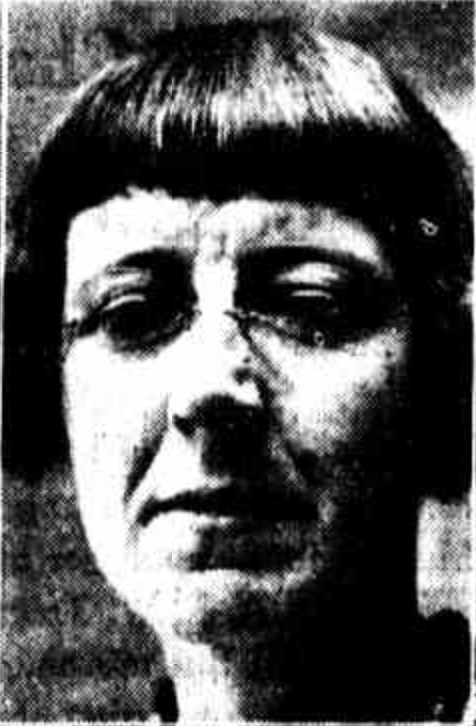
- Born: Ella May McFadyen; 26 November 1887; Stanmore, New South Wales, Australia
- Died: 22 August 1976 (aged 88); Lane Cove New South Wales, Australia
- Citizenship: Australian
- Occupations: poet, short story writer, journalist
- Writing career
- Pen name: Cinderella

Ella May McFadyen (26 November 1887 – 22 August 1976) was an Australian poet, journalist and children's writer. For 18 years she conducted "The Children's Page" for The Sydney Mail and was known as Cinderella.

== Early life and education ==
McFadyen was born at "Burrundulla", John Street, Stanmore on 26 November 1887 to Donald and Mary (née Wilson).

== Career ==
McFadyen's first short story accepted for publication was "The Wedding of Dolly Valerie" in 1906. It appeared in the "Young Folks" column of The Sydney Mail and New South Wales Advertiser on 31 January 1906. Her first published poem was "A Satin Shoe", published in May 1906 in The Australasian.

In addition to contributing to The Sydney Mail, her poems and short stories appeared in a number of other newspapers, including Australian Town and Country Journal and The Lone Hand.

McFadyen's first book of poetry, Outland born and other verses, published in 1911, was favourably reviewed by The Register (Adelaide) of 2 December 1911, who wrote "has a wealth of imagery, a fertile fancy, much technical skill, and in particular a virility".

From May 1912 to July 1913 McFadyen was a regular contributor of short stories and poems to "A Page for the Children" in The Sydney Mail. In late 1919 she was chosen to conduct "The Children’s Page" for The Sydney Mail, a role she fulfilled until the newspaper closed on 28 December 1938. For a further two and a half years "Cinderella’s Column" appeared in The Sydney Morning Herald, the final article being on 26 June 1941.

McFadyen donated all profits from publication of her 1917 collection of war poems, Songs of the Last Crusade to War Funds and dedicated the book to her brother who was on active service.

In the early 1920s she wrote the words for a series of part songs composed by Florence E. Axtens for use in schools. Songs included "Till We Forget", "The Kangaroo", "Hush-a-Hush", "The Mosquito", "The Mountain Echo" and "Wattle Blossom".

In 1924–1925 The Sydney Mail published her novella, Matched Pearls, serialised in four instalments.

McFadyen was a foundation member of the Society of Women Writers, formed in Sydney in 1925.

Her poem "Tom-Tit" was selected by Joan S. Mackaness and George Mackaness for inclusion in Angus & Robertson's Frolic Fair: A Book of Australian Verse for Children Under Ten.

In 1938 Dymocks published a collection of McFadyen's poems, both published and unpublished, called Here's Fun for You!. S.E.N. of The Sydney Mail complemented her for her "singing pen" and considered them "felicitous verse" which was "well suited to the unsophisticated, assimilative, and wholesome minds of children".

== Works ==
=== Books ===
==== Children ====
- Pegmen Tales 1946, Angus and Robertson OCLC 22350648
- Pegmen Go Walkabout 1947, Angus and Robertson OCLC 37095733
- Little Dragons Of The Never Never 1948, Australasian Publishing Company OCLC 219813138
- The Wishing Star 1956, Angus and Robertson OCLC 221050678
- The Big Book of Pegmen Tales (contains stories from Pegmen Tales and Pegmen Go Walkabout) 1959, Angus and Robertson OCLC 156764380
- The little World Of The Pegmen (selections from Pegmen Tales) 1983, Angus and Robertson ISBN 9780207144554

==== Poetry collections ====
- McFadyen, Ella (1911). Outland Born and Other Verses. Melbourne, [Vic]: Australasian Author's Agency.OCLC 1057926762
- McFadyen, Ella (1917). Songs of the Last Crusade. North Sydney.OCLC 1057932326
- McFadyen, Ella; Bell, Edwina (1938). Here's Fun For You!: Children's Verse For Recitation and Group Speaking. Sydney: Dymock's Book Arcade.OCLC 37089006

==== Theatre ====
- Kookaburra Comedies: Junior Plays c.1950, Australia, School Projects Limited OCLC 37098995

=== Music (lyrics) ===
- Till We Forget, c.1921, Nicholson & Co OCLC 221462095
- The Kangaroo, c.1921, Nicholson & Co OCLC 858642594
- Hush-a-Hush: The She Oak's Lullaby, c.1921, Nicholson & Co OCLC 223401724
- The Mosquito, c.1921, Nicholson & Co OCLC 607091337
- The Mountain Echo, c.1921, Nicholson & Co OCLC 858643708
- Wattle Blossom, c.1921, Nicholson & Co OCLC 607091338

=== Personal papers ===
- McFadyen, Ella. "Ella McFadyen aggregated collection of papers and pictorial material, ca. 1856-1977". State Library of NSW Catalogue.
