= Dulcie Dunlop Ladds =

Australian author and playwright

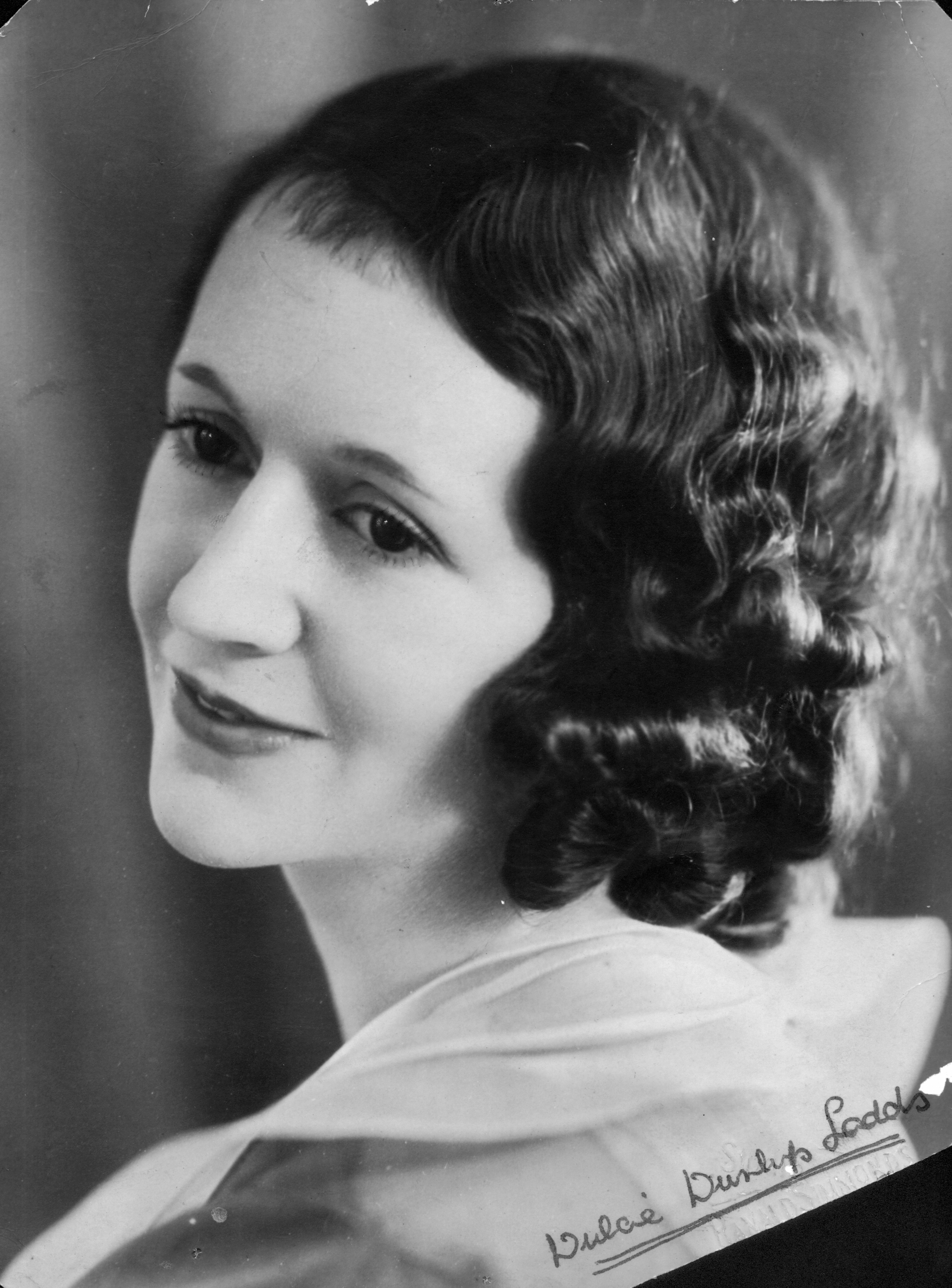
- Born: Isabel Dulcie Dunlop; 13 May 1906; Brisbane, Queensland, Australia
- Died: 17 April 1972 (aged 65); Sydney, New South Wales, Australia
- Other names: Mrs. Charles Ladds; Mrs. Samuel Charles Ladds

Dulcie Dunlop Ladds (13 May 1906 – 17 April 1972) was an Australian author, poet and playwright who was best known for her play We have Our Dreams.

== Life ==
Born Isabel Dulcie Dunlop, Ladds is known for her plays, stories, and serial publications. She wrote primarily about domestic issues and relationships between men and women. Most of her stories are set in Queensland, Australia. Her play, We have Our Dreams, was inspired by her time spent living on a banana plantation with her husband, Samuel Charles Ladds. The play was first produced in 1957. It was later translated into German and performed at the Baden Baden on the 15 March 1959. In her 1987 daughter Lola Tarnawski published, Such Stuff As Dreams, a biography of Ladds and a history detailing the writing of We have Our Dreams.

Ladds also ran a studio centered on dance and dramatic art in Brisbane, Australia.

== Selected publications ==
- Ladds, Dulcie Dunlop (1944). Marriage is monotonous and other stories. Brisbane : Bunyip Press.
- Ladds, Dulcie Dunlop (1944). The lighted window and other stories. Brisbane : Bunyip Press.

== Honors and awards ==
In 1938 Ladds won the Twelfth Night competition for her play What of Michael. In 1942 she was awarded the C.J. Dennis Memorial Award for We have Our Dreams.
