= Lucy Walker (writer) =

Australian writer

Dorothy Lucie Sanders

Dorothy Lucie Sanders (4 May 1907 – 17 December 1987), better known under the pseudonym Lucy Walker, was a prolific and successful Australian romance novelist.

== Personal life ==
Dorothy Lucie McClemans was born in Kalgoorlie, Western Australia, on 4 May 1907, the second of five daughters. Her father, William McClemans, was an Irish minister of the Church of England. Her mother, Ada Lucy Walker, was from New Zealand. After her parents divorced in 1928, her mother supported the family as a nurse and then as a Justice of the Peace.

A qualified teacher from Perth College (1928), Dorothy taught in state schools in Western Australia until 1936. She continued teaching later in London while her husband, Colsell Sanders, a fellow school teacher whom she married in 1936, completed his doctorate in education. They returned to Perth, Australia in 1938.

During her life, Dorothy was a member of the State Library Board of Western Australia, the State Advisory Board to the Australian Broadcasting Commission, and the Children's Court.

Her eldest son, Jon Sanders, was a well-known yachtsman who set a record in a non-stop solo triple circumnavigation of the globe. It was during this voyage that both of his parents died. Colsell Sanders died in 1986 and Dorothy Sanders died at Menora on 17 December 1987.

== Writing career ==
She began writing in 1945, producing articles, poetry, short stories, and later novels. In 1948 her first novel, Fairies on the Doorstep, was published. During her writing career, she published as Lucy Walker, Shelley Dean, and Dorothy Lucie Sanders. The London Daily Mirror named her "Australia's Queen of Romance". During the 1970s, several of her romance novels were serialized in Women's Weekly, bowlderized to meet the restrictive editorial requirements of the magazine.

As Lucy Walker, she wrote about 39 romance books over a thirty-year career. Popular in the United States and England, more than a million copies of her books were sold. Walker's romance novels were distinguished by their Outback settings.

Walker was an active member of the Australian Society of Authors and Fellowship of Australian Authors, and a member of the Society of Women Writers and Journalists, London.

In Germaine Greer's The Female Eunuch, Walker's romance novel The Loving Heart is used to illustrate that the traits of romance novel heroes "have been invented by women cherishing the chains of their bondage". Greer claimed the novel expressed a foot fetish and criticized the "infantile" heroine.

In an interview, Walker expressed her regret that the popularity of her romance novels detracted from her other novels and kept her from pursuing more serious writing. She said, "I am not unproud of Lucy Walker but I'll never really be sure of what I could have done without her...I used to think that if I had been given the chance I could have written The Great Australian Novel."

== Bibliography ==
Novels are listed by name of author and chronologically.

=== Dorothy Lucie Sanders ===
- Faeries on the Doorstep, 1948
- Six for Heaven, 1952
- Monday in Summer, 1954
- Shining River, 1954
- Waterfall, 1956
- Ribbons in Her Hair, 1957
- Pepper Tree Bay, 1959

=== Lucy Walker ===
- The One Who Kisses, 1954
- Sweet and Faraway, 1955
- Come Home, Dear, 1956
- Heaven is Here, 1957
- Master of Ransome, 1958
- The Orchard Hill, 1958
- Kingdom of the Heart, 1959
- The Stranger from the North, 1959
- Love in a Cloud, 1960
- The Loving Heart, 1960
- The Moonshiner, 1961
- Wife to Order, 1961
- The Distant Hills, 1962
- Down in the Forest, 1962
- The Call of the Pines, 1963
- Follow Your Star, 1963
- A Man Called Masters, 1963
- The Man from Outback, 1964
- The Ranger in the Hills, 1965
- The Other Girl, 1965
- The River is Down, 1966
- Reaching for the Stars, 1966
- The Gone-Away Man, 1968
- Home at Sundown, 1968
- Joyday for Jodi, 1971
- The Mountain That Went to the Sea, 1971
- Girl Alone, 1973
- The Runaway Girl, 1975
- Gamma's Girl, 1977

=== Shelley Dean ===
- South Sea Island, 1966
- Island in the South, 1967
