= Ellen Whinnett =

Australian journalist

- Born: 2 July 1971 (age 55); Launceston, Tasmania, Australia
- Occupations: Journalist, political editor, foreign correspondent

Ellen Whinnett (born 2 July 1971) is an Australian journalist. She has been the European correspondent for News Corp Australia, based in London, since 2016.

Whinnett was born in Launceston, Tasmania and worked for Tasmanian newspapers The Examiner, The Mercury and the Sunday Tasmanian, where she was chief reporter, for nine years before joining the Melbourne Herald Sun in 2005. She then worked as the news editor for the Saturday Herald Sun and chief reporter for the Sunday Herald Sun. In May 2011, she was promoted to deputy editor of the Sunday Herald Sun. She later became the national political editor of the Herald Sun.

She won the 2004 Walkley Award for print news reporting for her coverage of Richard Butler's controversial tenure as Governor of Tasmania, which eventually led to his resignation. She was the lead journalist on the Herald Sun's Take A Stand campaign against domestic violence, which was shortlisted for a Melbourne Press Club award and a finalist for a Walkley Foundation Our Watch award. In 2016, she broke the story of federal minister Stuart Robert's trip to China for a deal signing for a company that he held shares in, which subsequently forced his resignation.

In 2012, she was credited as a co-author of former Premier Steve Bracks' autobiography A Premier's State.

She was formerly in a relationship with former Victorian state minister Tim Holding.
