= Mary Salmon =

Australian journalist and historian

- Born: Mary Frederica Wright; 1852 at sea, aboard Stadt Utrecht
- Died: 7 January 1937 (aged 84–85); North Sydney, New South Wales, Australia
- Occupations: Journalist; historian; teacher

Mary Frederica Salmon (1852 – 7 January 1937) was an Australian journalist and historian. She contributed articles to newspapers and journals in Sydney, Melbourne and regional Australia.

== Early life and education ==
Mary Salmon was born in 1852 onboard the Dutch ship Stadt Utrecht, which had left London on 2 July and arrived in Sydney on 26 November. Her parents were Ferdinanda (died 1915) and John Matthew Wright (c. 1824 –19 August 1888), a chemist.

Salmon studied to become a teacher at Fort Street Training College, then run by Mrs McTaggart.

== Career ==
After qualifying, Salmon taught at a number of Sydney and regional schools, including at Springfield Ladies' College, Darlinghurst, a private boarding school for girls founded by Lady Agnes Murray and later run by Madame de Monsigny.

On 22 June 1901 Salmon married James Salmon at Hornsby. His death, just days later, was recorded in the same newspaper edition. September 1901 saw Salmon's first short story published under her married name. Before her marriage, using her initials M.F.W., she had contributed stories and articles to the Australian Town and Country Journal in Sydney, as well as to Melbourne-based The Argus and Australasian.

She was one of the inaugural members of the Society of Women Writers, founded in Sydney in September 1925. In the Australian Woman's Mirror of 1 June 1926, it was noted that "this country has produced its quota of feminine historians, the most entertaining writer of them all probably being Miss Mary Salmon".

== Writing ==
Salmon wrote a series of 18 articles on "The Suburbs of Sydney" for The Evening News in 1904. That was followed by 12 articles on "The Hawkesbury Settler" and seven on "The City Working Woman. How She Lives", the latter describing occupational fields open to women. Another series of 12 focused on "The Wharves of Sydney", while she wrote five pieces about "Dwellers in the City". Other subjects she wrote on included "Rural Industries Round Sydney" and "In the Shoalhaven District". 1906 saw her writing a 12-part series on "Some Early Ships, And Their Passengers", including a description of the wreck of the Dunbar based on a passenger's diary.

In 1907–08 for the Sunday Times, she wrote a series of 24 articles on "Historic Homes of N. S. Wales", concluding with Elizabeth Farm, the Macarthur home at Parramatta. From there she produced a series on "Historic Towns of N. S. Wales" and "Some Australian Pioneers", beginning in October 1909 with William Balmain who gave his name to the Sydney suburb, but it was not until April 1911 that she wrote about any women, choosing Caroline Chisholm, whom she referred to as the "National Heroine of Australia".

== Death ==
Salmon died on 7 January 1937 at her home, 163 Blues Point Road, North Sydney and was buried at Gore Hill Cemetery.
