= Mrs Carl Fischer =

Australian critic, journalist and headmistress (1834–1896)

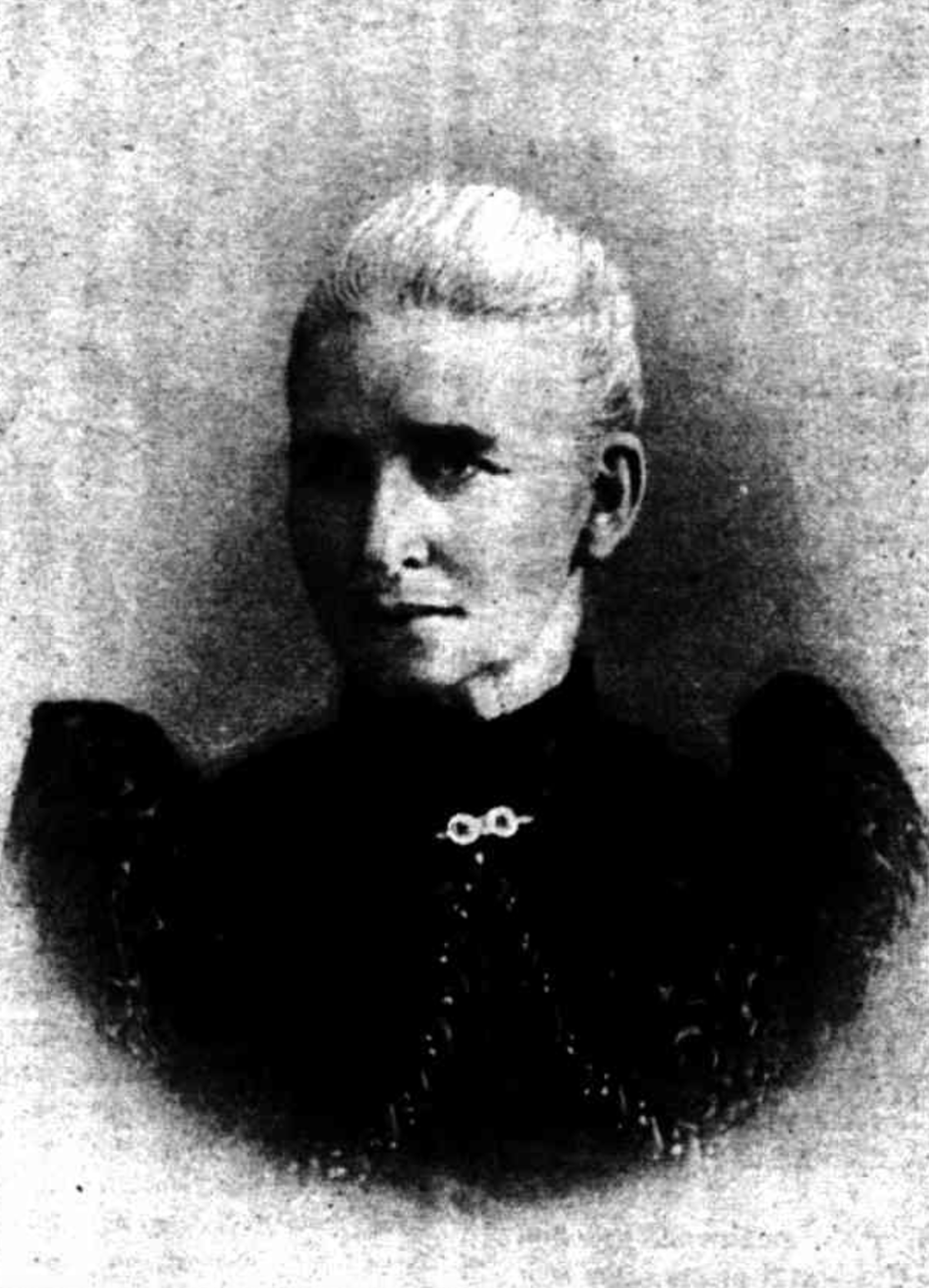
- Born: Jane Sara Edwards; 1834; Gloucestershire, England
- Died: 6 October 1896 (aged 61–62); Sydney, Colony of New South Wales
- Resting place: Waverley Cemetery
- Occupations: Music critic; theatre critic; journalist; headmistress
- Spouses: William Gilpin Dredge (died 1865); Wilhelm Carl Fischer (m. 1866)
- Children: 5
- Writing career
- Pen name: Mrs Carl Fischer

Jane Sara "Jenny" Fischer (née Edwards, formerly Dredge; 1834 – 6 October 1896), better known as Mrs Carl Fischer, was an English-born Australian music and theatre critic, journalist and headmistress. Fischer was active during a time at a time when "women journalists were almost unknown" in Australia.

== Life and career ==
Fischer was born Jane Sara Edwards in Gloucestershire, England in 1834. Her father, William Edwards, was a schoolteacher. In 1856 she migrated to Melbourne, Australia, where she married musician William Gilpin Dredge. Three of their five children died in childhood. At the time of his death on 20 February 1865, Dredge was honorary secretary of the Melbourne Philharmonic Society. The following year, on 23 June 1866 she married Wilhelm Carl Fischer, son of a Berlin banker at Christ Church, St Kilda.

In September 1870 she and her husband took over ownership and co-principals of Ladies' College, Geelong. Due to her husband's ill health, they were forced to quit the College in February 1878. A function was held at which a testimonial was presented to Fischer, recognising the impact of her contribution to education in Geelong. While there, she contributed articles on musical and theatrical performances to Melbourne newspapers.

In 1879, she visited Sydney to write reviews of performances by the Lyster Opera Company for The Sydney Morning Herald. She remained in Sydney and continued writing critiques and reviews for the Herald and The Sydney Mail for 17 years. For the Mail, she ran the women's section, including a question-and-answer column under the heading "Hausfrau's Lucky Bag".

Working with Lady Windeyer, Fischer was recognised as one of the instigators of the 1888 Exhibition of Women's Industries.

The Bulletin in 1927 noted that "in those days [1880s] women journalists were almost unknown" and that "the only prominent woman worker on the Sydney newspapers was old Mrs. Carl Fischer".

On 6 October 1896, Fischer died in Sydney, Colony of New South Wales. Fischer continued working for the Mail, almost until her death. Her role with that paper was taken over by Zara Aronson the following year. Her funeral and burial took place at Waverley Cemetery on 7 October and many telegrams, letters of sympathy and floral wreaths were received. A fund was established in her memory and £125 raised towards the education of her grandson.
