= Capel Boake =

Australian novelist

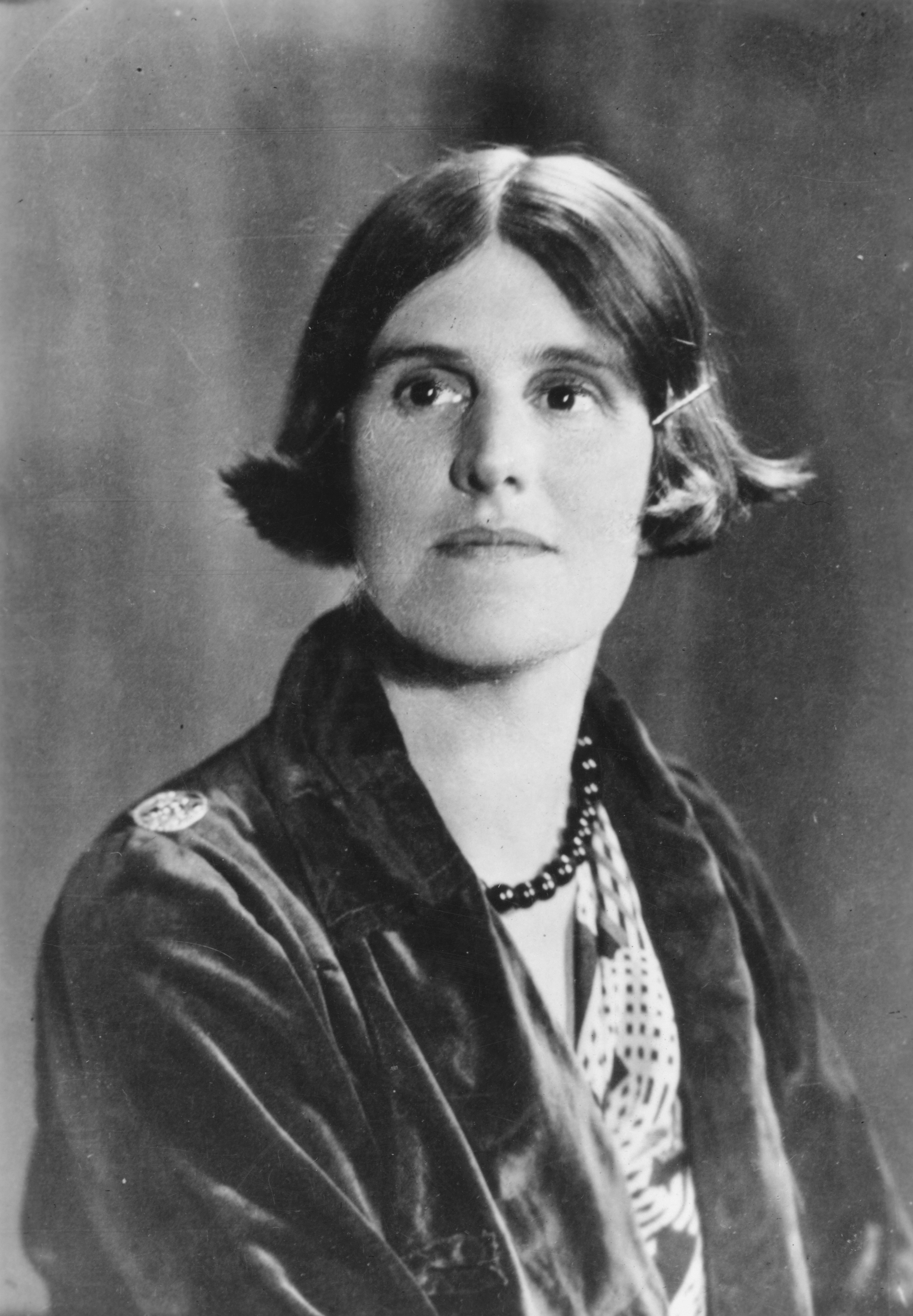
- Capel Boake
- Born: Doris Boake Kerr; 29 August 1889; Summer Hill, New South Wales, Australia
- Died: 5 June 1944 (aged 54); Caulfield, Victoria, Australia
- Occupation: Novelist

Doris Boake Kerr (29 August 1889 at Summer Hill, Sydney – 5 June 1944 at Caulfield, Victoria) was a writer who published using the pseudonyms Capel Boake and Stephen Grey.

Her publishing career began with a story appearing in the Australasian in January 1916. She later published a number of other stories in publications such as The Weekly Times, The Bulletin and The Herald.

She used the pseudonym Stephen Grey when writing in collaboration with Bernard Cronin.

The subject matter of her work included the options available to women in the early twentieth century, circus life, and early Melbourne history.

She was a founding member of the Society of Australian Authors as well as participating in local literary societies.

She was a niece of the Australian author Barcroft Boake.

== Bibliography ==
=== Novels ===
- Painted Clay (1917), Melbourne, published by the Australasian Authors' Agency and reprinted by Virago London in 1986, ISBN 086068766X
- The Romany Mark (1923), New South Wales Bookstall Co
- The Dark Thread (1936), Hutchinson London
- The Twig is Bent (1946), Angus & Robertson, written with the aid of a Commonwealth literary grant but published posthumously, Sydney

=== Poetry ===
- Kangaroo Rhymes (1922), Melbourne, as by "Stephen Grey"
- The Selected Poems of Capel Boake (1949), Melbourne
