= Owen Kember =

English cricketer

Owen David Kember (23 January 1943 – 11 January 2004) was an English first-class cricketer active 1962–63 who played for Surrey. He was born in Crowhurst; died in Bourn.
