= Wendy Lewis =

Australian writer (born 1962)

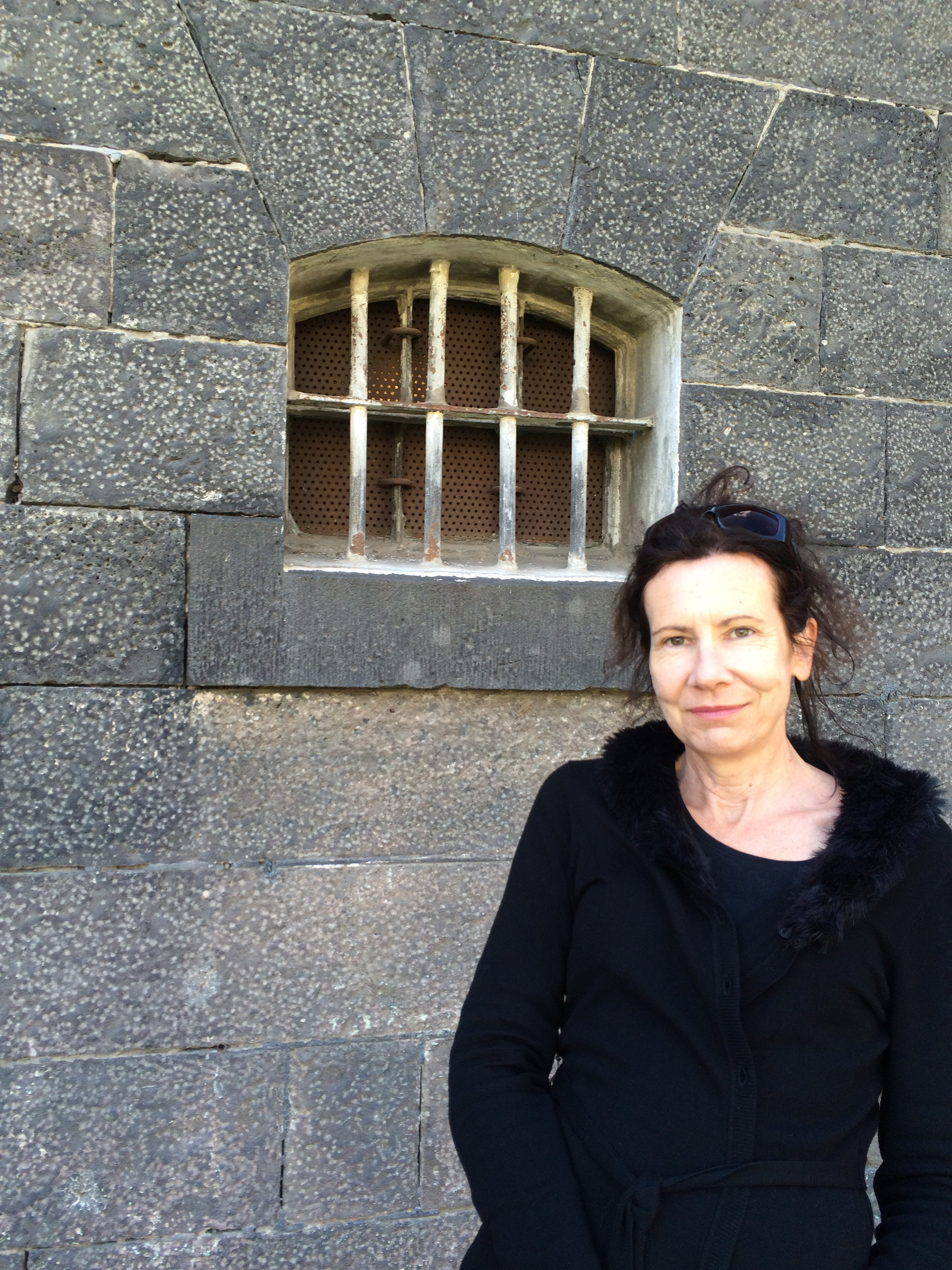
- Wendy Lewis, 2016
- Born: Sydney, Australia
- Occupation: Writer
- Writing career
- Genres: Non-fiction books, plays
- Notable works: Australians of the Year; See Australia and Die

Wendy Lewis is an Australian writer working in Sydney who has written a number of non-fiction books about Australian people, history and events. She also writes for the stage, specialising in dark comedy and musical theatre. Some of her plays are published under the pen-name Julia Lewis.

== Non-fiction ==
In 2010, Lewis was commissioned by the National Australia Day Council to write Australians of the Year, the official 50-year history of the Australian of the Year Award.

See Australia and Die describes incidents resulting in harm to people travelling in Australia, including from crocodile attacks, the sting of Irukandji jellyfish, and death by hypothermia.

Events That Shaped Australia recounts details, personages, the images and after-effects of important events in Australia's history.

Caught Out! Scandals, Lies, Cover-ups is a selection of Australian scandals including David Hicks, Muhamed Haneef, Children Overboard, Cheryl Kernot's big secret, The Mufti and the Uncovered Meat.

Gone describes 25 kidnapping cases in various countries.

Lewis' book Celebrating 150 years of Rookwood Catholic Cemetery was commissioned by the Catholic church. The book launch was celebrated with a mass at St Mary's Cathedral, followed by a cocktail party at the Hyde Park Barracks, Sydney.

== Theatre ==
Lewis has written plays entitled Statues of David, The Baggage Handler (2006) and Life Drawing (2013).

Lewis' musical What's My Color?, co-written with Berlin-based composer Yuval Halpern, premiered in the US in October 2016.

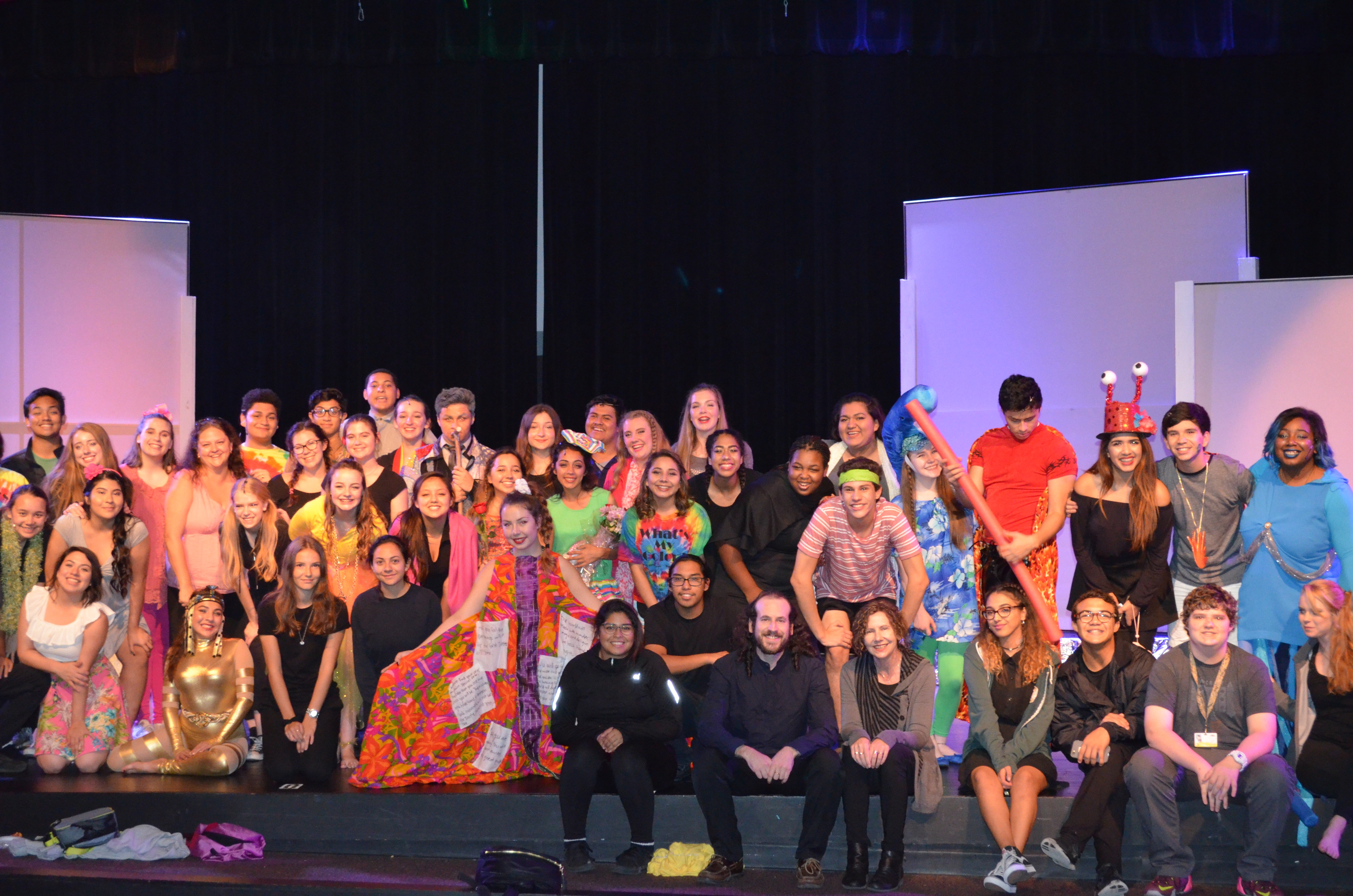
Cast and crew of What's My Color?, Opening night October 2016, Houston, TX, USA.

In 2018, Lewis adapted The Devil's Caress by June Wright to stage. The production presented June Wright's classic murder mystery interwoven with her life and times in post-war Melbourne. It was produced by Factory Space Theatre Company. The script was published by The Australian Script Centre.

In 2020, Lewis wrote book, lyrics and music for the dark musical comedy Defeating Roger Federer. It was performed at the New Theatre (Newtown) in 2020 and returned to the stage in Cabaret form for the Sydney Fringe Festival 2022.

In 2022, Lewis' mini musical Lost in Translation (with music by Yuval Halpern) premiered in 'schreib:maschine' at BKA Theatre Berlin.

== Other works ==
Lewis won a poetry competition in connection with Refresh Drummoyne, an urban art installation for the City of Canada Bay in Sydney in 2010. Her winning entry was typographed as a mural by a graphic designer in a manner that "refers to and resembles billboards, poster walls, newspaper headlines and antique film rolls."

== Bibliography ==
- Lewis, Wendy (2006). Dumbest Criminals. New Holland. ISBN 9781741102857.
- Lewis, Wendy; Balderstone, Simon; Bowan, John (2006). Events That Shaped Australia. New Holland. ISBN 9781741104929.
- Lewis, Wendy (2007). Dumbest Blunders. New Holland. ISBN 9781741105186.
- Lewis, Wendy (2007). See Australia and Die. New Holland. ISBN 9781741105834.
- Lewis, Wendy (2008). Caught Out! Scandals, Lies, Cover-ups. New Holland. ISBN 9781741106466.
- Lewis, Wendy (2010). Gone. Five Mile Press. ISBN 9781741785067.
- Lewis, Wendy (2010). Australians of the Year. Pier 9 Press. ISBN 9781741968095.
- Lewis, Wendy (2011). The Australian Book of Family Murders. Murdoch Books. ISBN 9781742662435.
- Lewis, Wendy (2013). Playing Dead - Twisted Tales of Fake Suicides. The Five Mile Press. ISBN 9781743463017.
- Lewis, Wendy (2016). Jailbreak : Australia's most unforgettable prison escapes. Echo Publishing. ISBN 9781760401238.
- Lewis, Wendy (2017). Celebrating 150 years of Rookwood Catholic Cemetery. Captain Honey. ISBN 9780646972893.
- Lewis, Wendy (2020). Please forgive us, Richard Hauptmann. Copycat. ISBN 978-1-925786-80-4.
