= National Service Act 1964 =

Repealed Australian legislation

Parliament of Australia
- Long title: An Act to Amend the National Service Act 1951–1957
- Citation: No. 126 of 1964
- Territorial extent: States and territories of Australia
- Royal assent: 24 November 1964
- Repealed: 30 June 1992

Amends
- National Service Act 1951

Repealed by
- Defence Legislation Amendment Act 1992
- Status: Repealed

The National Service Act 1964 (Cth) is repealed legislation made by the Parliament of the Commonwealth of Australia, passed on 24 November 1964. It amended the National Service Act 1951 to require 20-year-old males to serve in the Army for a period of twenty-four months of continuous service (reduced to eighteen months in 1971) followed by three years in the Reserve.

The Defence Act 1965 amended the Defence Act 1903 in May 1965 to provide that conscripts could be obliged to serve overseas, and in March 1966 prime minister Harold Holt announced that National Servicemen would be sent to Vietnam to fight in units of the Australian Regular Army.

== Background ==
On 5 November 1964, Cabinet decided to introduce a compulsory selective National Service scheme. In announcing this decision to Parliament, Prime Minister Robert Menzies referred to 'aggressive Communism', developments in Asia such as 'recent Indonesian policies and actions' and a 'deterioration in our strategic position' as being influential in the decision being reached. The Government had concluded that Australia had inadequate defence manpower and aimed to increase the strength of the Army to 33,000 by the end of 1966 by introducing national service.

== Provisions ==
Sections 5–9 deal with the amendments to registration. Sections 10–14 and 16 deal with the liability to serve, with sections 15, 17 and 18 accommodating the conscript's civilian employment.

== Reaction ==
Then Leader of the Opposition and Leader of the Australian Labor Party, Arthur Calwell, called the scheme the 'lottery of death'.

== Legacy ==
Between 1965 and December 1972, over 800,000 men registered for National Service, with some 63,000 conscripted and over 19,000 serving in Vietnam. Although registration was compulsory, a biannual process of selection by ballot determined who would be called up. The ballots selected several dates in the selected period and all males with corresponding birthdays were called up for national service. The ballot was conducted using a lottery barrel and marbles representing birthdays.

Conscription ended as one of the first acts of the newly elected Labor Whitlam government in December 1972.

== See also ==
- Conscription in Australia
