= Defence Act 1903 =

Act of the Parliament of Australia

Parliament of Australia
- Long title: An Act to provide for the Naval and Military Defence and Protection of the Commonwealth and of the several States
- Citation: No. 20 of 1903 as amended
- Territorial extent: States and territories of Australia
- Assented to: 22 October 1903
- Commenced: 1 March 1904
- Status: In force

The Defence Act 1903 (Cth) is an act of the Parliament of the Commonwealth of Australia, that acquired royal assent on 22 October 1903. It was created to allow for the naval and military defence of Australia. The act was amended and expanded over time, to legislate for in 1911 and then repeal conscription in 1929, bring it back in 1939, and finally abolish it in 1972; to incorporate the Naval Defence Act 1910 and the Air Force Act 1923, and today governs how the Australian Defence Force operates.

== Background ==
On 1 January 1901, the federation of the Australian colonies to form the Commonwealth of Australia was proclaimed, with the newly in force Constitution of Australia requiring that the colonial military forces be combined under the Commonwealth.

== Act ==
=== Original ===
The act, as originally made, consisted of 11 parts, 124 sections, and 3 schedules.

=== Current ===
As of May 2024, the act is divided into 25 parts, approximately 384 sections, and 1 schedule.

==== Administration ====
Part II and Part III's Division 1 covers the administrative aspects of the defence force. The rest of part III covers the requirements of service, including reservist service, and remuneration. Part IV deals with the citizenry's liability to serve within the defence forces, while part V covers the Australian Defence Force Cadets. Part VI charges the Governor–General with special powers. Part VII to IX deal with disputes and offences committed under the act.

== Amendments ==
- Defence Act 1904
- Defence Act 1909
- Naval Defence Act 1910
- Defence Act 1910
- Defence Act 1911
- Defence Act 1912
- Defence Act 1914
- Defence Act 1915
- Defence Act 1917
- Defence Act 1918
- Defence Act 1927
- Defence Act 1932
- Defence Act 1939
- Defence Act (No. 2) 1939
- Defence Act (No. 3) 1939
- Air Force Act 1939
- Defence Act 1941
- Re-establishment and Employment Act 1945
- Defence Act 1949
- Defence Act 1951
- Defence Act (No. 2) 1951
- Defence Act 1952
- Defence Act 1953
- Defence Act 1956
- Defence Act 1964
- Defence Act 1965
- Defence Act 1970
- Defence Force Re-organisation Act 1975
- Defence Amendment Act 1979
- Defence Acts Amendment Act 1981
- Defence Legislation Amendment Act 1984
- Defence Legislation Amendment Act 1987
- Defence Legislation Amendment Act (No. 2) 1988
- Defence Legislation Amendment Act 1992
- Defence Legislation Amendment Act 1993
- Defence Legislation Amendment Act 1996
- Defence Legislation Amendment Act (No. 1) 1997
- Defence Legislation Amendment Act (No. 1) 1999
- Defence Legislation Amendment Acts 2000
- Defence Legislation Amendment Acts 2001
- Defence Amendment Act 2005
- Defence Legislation Amendment Act (No. 2) 2005
- Defence Legislation Amendment Acts 2006
- Defence Legislation Amendment Act (No. 1) 2010
- Defence Legislation Amendment Acts 2011
- Defence Legislation Amendment Acts 2015
- Defence Legislation Amendment Acts 2017
- Defence Act 2018
- Defence Legislation Amendment Act 2020

== See also ==
- Australian Army
- Military history of Australia
