= Lorraine Kember =

Australian author and blogger

- Born: 1950 (age 75–76)
- Occupations: Motivational speaker, author, caregiver advocate

Lorraine Kember (born 1950) is an Australian author, blogger, caregiver advocate, and inspirational and motivational speaker.

Her husband of more than 30 years, Brian Kember, was diagnosed with a rare cancer, malignant pleural mesothelioma, in 1999 when he was 52 years old. Brian was given three to nine months to live, but lived more than a year beyond that prognosis.

After Brian’s diagnosis, Lorraine sold her retail business to become a full-time caregiver for her husband. Under Lorraine’s care, Brian lived for two years with pleural mesothelioma.

== Books ==
Following her husband's death, Lorraine read over her personal journal entries and wrote a book about her experiences as a mesothelioma caregiver. The book, Lean on Me: Cancer Through a Carer’s Eyes, was published in 2004. It contains excerpts of Lorraine’s journal, her poetry and information about caring for someone with cancer. Caregiving topics like pain control, symptom management, anticipatory grief, and coping with emotions are discussed in Lean on Me. The book has been translated into Braille and audio book for the blind.

In 2006, Kember released a book of her poetry, Tear Drops: A Journey of Grief, Healing & Hope. Her third book, Looking Forward–Looking Back: The Grieving Journey, is a sequel to Lean on Me. The sequel, published in 2012, follows Kember’s journey after the death of her husband.

== Public Speaking and Media Appearances ==
Kember speaks publicly about the dangers of asbestos exposure, which is the primary cause of mesothelioma. She spoke in 2004 at the World Asbestos Congress in Tokyo, Japan.

She has made at least seven appearances on television and other media outlets, including Australian Broadcasting Corporation’s George Negus Tonight. In April 2004, Australian Broadcasting Corporation Radio National aired a documentary on Kember’s experience as a caregiver.

For five years, Kember worked as a coordinator for the Cancer Support Centre in Australia.
