= Marion Halligan =

Australian novelist (1940–2024)

Marion Halligan AM
- Born: Marion Mildred Crothall; 16 April 1940; Newcastle, New South Wales, Australia
- Died: 19 February 2024 (aged 83); Canberra, Australian Capital Territory, Australia
- Occupation: Writer
- Writing career
- Language: English
- Notable works: Valley of Grace, The Golden Dress

Marion Mildred Halligan AM (16 April 1940 – 19 February 2024) was an Australian writer and novelist. She authored twenty-three books, including fiction, short-fiction, and non-fiction. Her novel Lovers' Knots (1992) won The Age Book of the Year, The ACT Book of the Year and the inaugural Nita B. Kibble Award. The Golden Dress (1998) was shortlisted for the Miles Franklin Award, The Dublin IMPAC Award and The Age Book of the Year. Her novels The Point (2003) and Valley of Grace (2009) also won The ACT Book of the Year. Halligan Served as Chairperson of the Literature Board of the Australia Council (1992–95) and the Australian National Word Festival. She was appointed a Member of the Order of Australia (AM), General Division, in 2006 'for service to Literature as an author, to the promotion of Australian writers and to support for literary events and professional organisations'.

== Biography ==
Marion Mildred Halligan nee Crothall was born in Newcastle, NSW, in 1940, the older sister to Rosie (later Rosanne Fitzgibbons) and Brenda. Following High School, she attended Newcastle University (BA Hons.) and then moved to Canberra to undertake postgraduate work in English, studying Shakespeare at the Australian National University. While at the ANU, Marion met Graham Halligan, then a lecturer in the French Department, whom she married in 1963. They went on to raise their two children, Lucy and James. Halligan abandoned formal academic study to concentrate on her creative talents. While honing these, she also worked as a teacher and freelance journalist, writing book reviews and about food. Halligan continued to contribute to newspapers via a weekly column in the Canberra Times and in the many book reviews she wrote over subsequent years to which she brought her acute critical mind and her eloquent gifts of appreciation.

Although her career blossomed after the publication of her first novel in 1987, Halligan's later years were marked by a series of bereavements which she publicly bore with much courage, grace, and stoicism. Halligan's husband of thirty-five years, Graham, died in 1998; her daughter, Lucy, at the age of 38 in 2004; her beloved sisters, Rosie in 2012 and Brenda in 2014 and lastly, also tragically early, her son James, a talented musician, in 2022. Halligan's last years were also marked by ill-health as she battled kidney disease, latterly facing dialysis three times a week. She continued to work, however, and took much comfort from her relationship with the poet, John Stokes, and from her grandchildren, Bianca and Edgar.

== Career ==
While working as a schoolteacher and free-lance journalist, Halligan became a member of a group 'Seven Writers' sometimes known as 'The Canberra Seven'. The other women in the group were Margaret Barbalet, Sara Dowse, Suzanne Edgar, Marian Eldridge, Dorothy Horsfield and Dorothy Johnston. They began to meet in the early 1980s to encourage and criticise each other's works. In 1988 they published a joint anthology of short stories Canberra Tales, which was reprinted under the title, The Division of Love in 1995.

Halligan's first novel, Self-Possession, was published in 1987. From these beginnings Halligan's career developed such that she became one of the most important and well-loved writers in Australia. She wrote twenty-three sole-authored books: 11 novels, six books of non-fiction and memoir, four collections of short-stories, plus a Collected Stories, and a story for children. Many of these titles won major awards including The Age Book of the Year, the Nita B. Kibble Award, the Steele Rudd Award, Braille Book of the Year, the Prize for Gastronomic Writing, the 3m Talking Book of the Year and the ACT Book of the Year, this last three times. Other books were short-listed for the Commonwealth Writers Prize, The Miles Franklin Award, The Age Book of the Year, the Nita B. Kibble Award, and the Dublin IMPAC Award. Her last book, Words for Lucy, published in 2022, was shortlisted for the ACT Book of the Year.

Halligan's achievements have also been recognised in an artwork commissioned by the ACT government, 'The Cushion and the Wedge', situated in Garema Place, Canberra, which includes engraved and inlaid poetry by Halligan. The Canberra Writers Centre has recently changed its name to Marion in honour of Halligan.

As the range of these intertextual allusions might suggest, there is also in Halligan's work a full cognisance of modernist and post-modern developments in fiction. Her deployment of light irony, self-conscious playfulness, sly humour, the signalling of the fictive world through self-reflexive narration, a tendency sometimes for realism to veer towards magic realism, and her willingness to embrace formal experiment (particularly evident in Lovers' Knots and The Fog Garden), are markers of intellectual and aesthetic sophistication, which, because her work is easy to read, her prose so compelling, it might be easy to overlook.

The matter of her work is as significant as its manner. Unlike older writers and performers like Patrick White and Barry Humphries who mercilessly satirised Australian suburban life, Halligan knew and expressed and honoured that all human life was there. In her own words she believed 'suburbia' to be 'one of the great achievements of the human spirit.' Halligan brought Canberra to literary life. Not just the Canberra of politicians and public servants. All of Canberra life. This is not say she was parochial. There are stories, novels and non-fiction set in Europe, particularly France and England, but much of the significance of her work arises from its willingness to explore the moral and political dilemmas arising from the quotidian concerns of suburban existence. As Gillian Dooley has said in this regard Marion's work resembles that of Iris Murdoch, not stylistically, not as imitation, but in its range of concerns. Halligan expressed the idea in conversation and in print that the novel should be about how best to live. As she remarked in her interview with Dooley, sometimes that is best approached through characters who are rather bad at it!

There are feminist perspectives in Halligan's work, but she never succumbs to what Auden called 'the preacher's loose immodest tone' or ideological certainty. Dark aspects of human experience are not avoided, but above all Halligan was a lover of life, of people and of language. Her work is life-affirming, its dominant tone buoyant, its movement always towards celebration. There is a great relish in her writing for everyday objects. She knew that our lives are enhanced by our relationship to both useful and beautiful things. Early in The Taste of Memory, Halligan writes: 'I realised that museums are very like novels: the objects in them are an answer to the question which good novels always pose, the question: How shall we live? And all the various forms of that: How do we achieve the good life? What makes life worth living? How might we express ourselves? How can we broaden our lives? How give meaning and comfort to them?' She goes on to describe with her usual acuity what she calls 'the frail treasures' she encountered in the Newcastle Regional Museum.

Gardens are another recurring delight in Halligan's writing. Across many works, she explores or alludes to the various cultural, religious, and mythological resonances of the image – the walled suburban garden with its Paradisal promise notwithstanding the presence of various serpents. In The Fog Garden, one of the characters, Polly, in dialogue reminds us, 'That's what the word actually means, you know. The Greek word paradeisos means just that, garden.'

== Awards ==
Halligan was appointed Member of the Order of Australia (AM) in the 2006 Birthday Honours "for service to literature as an author, to the promotion of Australian writers and to support for literary events and professional organisations."

== Prizes ==
=== Awarded ===
- 1989 – Steele Rudd Award for The Living Hothouse (1988)
- 1989 – Braille Book of the Year for The Living Hothouse (1988)
- 1990 – Pascall Prize for critical writing
- 1990 – Prize for Gastronomic writing for Eat My Words (1990)
- 1992 – The Age Book of the Year for Lovers' Knots (1992)
- 1993 – ACT Book of the Year joint winner for Lovers' Knots (1992)
- 1993 – 3M Talking Book of the Year for Lovers' Knots (1992)
- 1994 – Nita B Kibble Award winner for Lovers' Knots (1992)
- 2004 – ACT Book of the Year for The Point (2003)
- 2010 – ACT Book of the Year for Valley of Grace (2009)

=== Shortlisted ===
- 1990 – NBC Banjo Award for Spider Cup (1990)
- 1993 – NBC Banjo Award for Lovers' Knots (1992)
- 1998 – The Age Book of the Year for The Golden Dress (1998)
- 1999 – The Miles Franklin Award for The Golden Dress (1998)
- 1999 – The IMPAC Dublin Award for The Golden Dress (1998)
- 2002 – Nita B Kibble Literary Award for The Golden Dress (1998)
- 2002 – Queensland Premier's Literary Award for The Fog Garden (2001)
- 2002 – Nita B Kibble Literary Award for The Fog Garden (2001)
- 2004 – Commonwealth Writers' Prize South East Asia and South Pacific Region, Best Book shortlisted for The Fog Garden (2001)
- 2010 – ACT Book of the Year for Words for Lucy (2022)

== Bibliography ==
=== Fiction ===
- Self Possession (1987)
- Spider Cup (1990)
- Lovers' Knots (1992)
- Wishbone (1994)
- The Golden Dress (1998)
- The Fog Garden (2001)
- The Point (2003)
- The Apricot Colonel (2006)
- Murder on the Apricot Coast (2008)
- Valley of Grace (2009)
- Goodbye Sweetheart (2015)

=== Short Fiction ===
- The Living Hothouse (1988)
- The Hanged Man in the Garden (1989)
- The Worry Box (1993)
- Collected Stories (1997)
- Shooting the Fox (2011)

=== Non-fiction ===
- Eat My Words (1990)
- Out of the Picture (1996)
- Cockles of the Heart (1996)
- The Taste of Memory (2004)
- Words for Lucy (2022)
- Those Women Who Go To Hotels (1997) - with Lucy Frost

=== Drama ===
Gastronomica, Five one-act plays, (1994)

=== Children's ===
- The Midwife's Daughters (1997)

=== Edited ===
- The Gift of Story: Three Decades of UQP Short Stories (1998) with Rosanne Fitzgibbon
- Storykeepers (2001)

=== Contributed works ===
- "Most mortal enemy", "Belladonna gardens", and "Perilous seas" published in Canberra Tales: Stories (1988). "Belladonna gardens" had previously been published in Meanjin, "Perilous seas" in Fiction '88, edited by Frank Moorhouse, ABC Publications.
- "By the Book" published in How we met : true confessions of love, lust and that fateful first meeting. Camberwell, Vic.: Penguin, 2007

=== Critical studies and reviews of Halligan's work ===
- Armstrong, Judith (June 2011). "Minds of others". Australian Book Review (332): 57. Review of Shooting the Fox.
- Bennett, Bruce (2002). Australian Short Fiction: A History. University of Queensland Press. pp 228–31
- Wilde, Hooton, Andrews, Eds (1994). The Oxford Companion to Australian Literature (2nd Edition), Oxford University Press. pp 338–339
