= Marian Eldridge =

Australian writer (1936–1997)

- Born: Marian Favel Clair Stockfeld; 1 February 1936 Melbourne, Victoria, Australia
- Died: 14 February 1997 (aged 61) Canberra, Australian Capital Territory, Australia
- Occupation: Short story writer; poet; book reviewer

Marian Favel Clair Eldridge (1 February 1936 – 14 February 1997) was an Australian short story writer and book reviewer.

== Biography ==
Marian Favel Clair Stockfeld was born in Melbourne, Victoria on 1 February 1936. She grew up on her parents' property outside Lancefield. Eldridge graduated from the University of Melbourne in 1957 with a BA and then taught high school English and History in Traralgon and in Canberra.

She was a member of the "Canberra Seven" or "Canberra Seven Writers" along with Marion Halligan, Dorothy Johnston, Margaret Barbalet, Sara Dowse, Suzanne Edgar and Dorothy Horsfield, who met to critique and encourage each other's writing.

Her stories were published in Australian literary journals, including Coast to Coast, Westerly, Festival and Australian Voices. She wrote book reviews for Australian Book Review and The Canberra Times.

== Selected works ==
=== Short story collections ===
- Walking the Dog (1984)
- The Woman at the Window (1989)
- The Wild Sweet Flowers: The Alvie Skerritt Stories (1994)

=== Novel ===
- Springfield (1992)

== Awards and recognition ==
Eldridge was joint winner of the 1981 Canberra Times National Short Story Competition and won the 1992 ACT Literary Award and was runner-up for the same award the following year. Her anthology, The Woman at the Window, was highly commended in the 1990 Barbara Ramsden Award, while The Wild Sweet Flowers won the NSW International Year of the Family Award in 1994.

== Death and legacy ==
Eldridge died on 14 February 1997 in Canberra.

Eldridge Crescent in the Canberra suburb of Garran was named in her honour. Her papers are held in the National Library of Australia.
