= Suzanne Edgar =

Australian poet & writer (born 1939)

- Born: Suzanne Godwin; 13 October 1939 (age 86); Glenelg, South Australia
- Education: University of Adelaide
- Occupations: poet; short story writer; historian

Suzanne Edgar (born 13 October 1939) is an Australian poet, short story writer and historian.

== Life ==
Suzanne Edgar was born Glenelg, South Australia on 13 October 1939. She was educated at Adelaide Teachers' College and the University of Adelaide, graduating with a BA (hons). She met Peter Edgar in first year at university and they married in 1961.

After moving to Canberra, Edgar was employed by the Australian Dictionary of Biography as their South Australian research editor. While working there from 1969 to 1998, she contributed 55 biographies of people, ranging from a male premier to a female bus driver. At the same time, Edgar worked part-time at the Australian National University, lecturing in literature. She also wrote book and film reviews.

Edgar was a member of the "Canberra Seven" or "Canberra Seven Writers" along with Marion Halligan, Dorothy Johnston, Margaret Barbalet, Sara Dowse, Marian Eldridge and Dorothy Horsfield. They met regularly to critique each other's writing. In 1988 four of her short stories were included in Canberra Tales: Stories, published in 1988 by the group.

Edgar published her first book, Counting Backwards and Other Stories, in 1991. It was shortlisted for the Steele Rudd Award in 1992. Since then she has written four books of poetry and contributed poetry and stories to literary journals such as Quadrant.

== Selected works ==
- Edgar, Suzanne (1991). Counting backwards and other stories. St Lucia, Qld., Australia: University of Queensland Press. ISBN 978-0-7022-2316-7.
- —— (2006). The painted lady. Ginninderra Press. ISBN 978-1-74027-398-5.
- —— (2012). The love procession : poems. Ginninderra Press. ISBN 978-1-74027-775-4.
- —— (2012). Still life : and other poems. Picaro Press.
- Edgar, Suzanne; Kituai, Kathy; Renew, Sandra; Hall, Hazel, eds. (2015). Flood, fire & drought. Ginninderra Press. ISBN 978-1-74027-929-1.
- —— (2019). Catching the light. Ginninderra Press. ISBN 978-1-76041-736-9.
