= ACT Book of the Year Award =

Australian annual literary award

- First award: 1993
- Website: ACT Book of the Year Award

The ACT Book of the Year Award is an annual prize of $10,000 awarded for a literary work of fiction, nonfiction or poetry written by an author from the Australian Capital Territory. The award was inaugurated in 1993 with $5,000 prize money. The Award showcases the talent and the excellence of local authors and is also intended to "inspire those who have an idea, a seed for a book to ‘pick up the pen’ and get writing".

== Winners and select shortlist ==
| Year | Author | Title | Publisher | Result | Ref. |
|---|---|---|---|---|---|
| 1993 | Marion Halligan | Lovers' Knots | Heinemann | Joint winners | |
| 1993 | A. D. Hope | Chance Encounters | Melbourne University Press | Joint winners | |
| 1994 | John Foulcher | New and Selected Poems | Brandl & Schlesinger | Winner | |
| 1995 | Sara Dowse | Sapphires | Penguin Group | Winner | |
| 1996 | Paul Hetherington | Shadow Swimmer | Molonglo Press | Winner | |
| 1997 | Francesca Rendle-Short | Imago | Spinifex Press | Winner | |
| 1998 | Lee Chittick | Travelling With Percy : A South Coast Journey | Aboriginal Studies Press | Winner | |
| 1999 | Craig Cormick | Unwritten Histories | Aboriginal Studies Press | Winner | |
| 2000 | Adrian Caesar | The White: Last days in the Antarctic Journeys of Scott and Mawson 1911-1913 | Picador | Winner | |
| 2001 | Alan Gould | The Schoonermaster's Dance | Flamingo | Joint Winners | |
| 2001 | Dorothy Johnston | The Trojan Dog | Wakefield Press | Joint Winners | |
| 2002 | Jackie French | In the Blood | Angus & Robertson | Winner | |
| 2003 | John Clanchy | The Hard Word | University of Queensland Press | Winner | |
| 2004 | Marion Halligan | The Point | Allen & Unwin | Winner | |
| 2005 | Tony Kevin | A Certain Maritime Incident : the sinking of SIEV X | Scribe Publications | Winner | |
| 2006 | John Clanchy | Vincenzo's Garden | University of Queensland Press | Winner | |
| 2007 | Quynh Du Thon That | Sunday Menu : selected short stories of Pham Thi Hoai | Pandanus | Winner | |
| 2008 | Tony Kevin | Walking the Camino : A Modern Pilgrimage to Santiago | Scribe Publications | Winner | |
| 2009 | Nicholas Drayson | A Guide to the Birds of East Africa: A Novel | Viking | Winner | |
| 2010 | Marion Halligan | Valley of Grace | Allen & Unwin | Winner | |
| 2011 | Chris Hammer | The River: A journey through the Murray-Darling Basin | Melbourne University Press | Winner | |
| 2012 | Bill Gammage | The Biggest Estate on Earth: How Aborigines Made Australia | Allen & Unwin | Winner | |
| 2013 | Frank Bongiorno | The Sex Lives of Australians : A History | Black Inc. | Winner | |
| 2014 | Gordon Peake | Beloved land: stories, Struggles and secrets from Timor-Leste | Scribe Publications | Winner | |
| 2015 | Mark Henshaw | The Snow Kimono | Text Publishing | Winner | |
| 2016 | Frank Bongiorno | The Eighties : the decade that transformed Australia | Black Inc. | Winner | |
| 2017 | Tom Griffiths | The Art of Time Travel : Historians and their craft | Black Inc. | Winner | |
| 2018 | Paul Collis | Dancing Home | University of Queensland Press | Winner | |
| 2019 | Robyn Cadwallader | Book of Colours | HarperCollins | Winner | |
| 2020 | Lisa Fuller | Ghost Bird | University of Queensland Press | Winner | |
| 2021 | Subhash Jaireth | Spinoza's Overcoat: Travels with Writers and Poets | Transit Lounge | Winner | |
| 2022 | Lucy Neave | Believe in Me | University of Queensland Press | Winner | |
| 2022 | Merlinda Bobis | The Kindness of Birds | | Highly Commended | |
| 2022 | Dylan van den Berg | Milk | | Highly Commended | |
| 2022 | Omar Musa | Killernova | | Highly Commended | |
| 2022 | Tim Bonyhady | Two Afternoons in the Kabul Stadium: A History of Afghanistan Through Clothes, Carpets and the Camera | | Shortlisted | |
| 2022 | Hugh Poate | Failures of Command: The Death of Private Robert Poate | | Shortlisted | |
| 2022 | Kaya Wilson | As Beautiful As Any Other: A Memoir of My Body | | Shortlisted | |
| 2023 | Frank Bongiorno | Dreamers and Schemers: A political history of Australia | La Trobe University Press | Winner | |
| 2023 | Julieanne Lamond | Lohrey | | Highly Commended | |
| 2023 | Marion Halligan | Words for Lucy | | Highly Commended | |
| 2023 | Niki Savva | Bulldozed: Scott Morrison's fall and Anthony Albanese's rise | | Shortlisted | |
| 2023 | Katrina Marson | Legitimate Sexpectations: the power of sex-ed | | Shortlisted | |
| 2023 | Robert Bowker | Tomorrow There will be Apricots | | Shortlisted | |
| 2024 | Chris Hammer | The Seven | Allen & Unwin | Winner | |
| 2024 | Ayesha Inoon | Untethered | HarperCollins Australia | Highly Commended | |
| 2024 | J. Ashley-Smith | The Measure of Sorrow: Stories | Meerkat Press (Atlanta, USA) | Highly Commended | |
| 2024 | Paul Hetherington | Sleeplessness | Pierian Springs Press | Shortlisted | |
| 2024 | Mavis Kerinaiua and Laura Rademaker | Tiwi Story: Turning history downside up | NewSouth Publishing | Shortlisted | |
| 2024 | Jackie French | The Great Gallipoli Escape | Angus & Robertson (HarperCollins Children’s Books) | Shortlisted | |
| 2025 | Darren Rix & Craig Cormick | Warra Warra Wai | Simon & Schuster Australia | Winner | |
| 2025 | Theodore Ell | Lebanon Days | Atlantic Books Australia; Allen & Unwin (digital) | Highly Commended | |
| 2025 | Qin Qin | Model Minority Gone Rogue | Hachette Australia | Shortlisted | |
| 2025 | Andra Putnis | Stories My Grandmothers Didn’t Tell Me | Allen & Unwin | Shortlisted | |
