= Bulldozed (book) =

2022 book by Niki Savva

Bulldozed: Scott Morrison's fall and Anthony Albanese's rise
- Author: Niki Savva
- Subject: Morrison government and the 2022 Australian federal election
- Publisher: Scribe
- Publication date: 1 December 2022
- Pages: 400
- Awards: 2023 Australian Political Book of the Year (won); 2023 BookPeople Non-fiction Book of the Year (won); 2023 Australian Book Industry Awards (won); 2023 ACT Book of the Year Award (shortlisted)
- ISBN: 978-1-922-58598-1
- Preceded by: Plots and Prayers: Malcolm Turnbull's demise and Scott Morrison's ascension
- Followed by: Earthquake: the election that shook Australia
- Website: scribepublications.com.au/books/bulldozed

Bulldozed: Scott Morrison's fall and Anthony Albanese's rise is an Australian political book centred on the Morrison government and the 2022 Australian federal election authored by Niki Savva. It was released on 1 December 2022 and published by Scribe.

== Content ==
In Bulldozed, Savva examines the performance of the Liberal–National Coalition government led by Scott Morrison during the lead up to the 2022 Australian federal election. Savva examines the Scott Morrison ministerial positions controversy and reports upon the reactions of ministers in Morrison's government, she also reveals internal disagreements over whether to include a childcare package within the 2021 budget. Savva reports on the "moderates" within the Liberal Party who asserted authority in very few occasions.

Also in the book, Savva criticises Morrison by calling him "a deeply flawed personality, a duplicitous, damaged leader with limited horizons and appalling judgment".

== Reception ==
Writing for The Sydney Morning Herald, Dennis Altman said of the book "Like most books written quickly to capture political events, Bulldozed is repetitive and unnecessarily verbose", he also wrote "But it is an engrossing read and future historians will find it a rich mine to explore, even if they disagree with Savva's judgments."

Writing for The Conversation, Frank Bongiorno said "Savva was herself senior media adviser to former Liberal treasurer Peter Costello, and the sensation is often that of the insider looking out and explaining to the rest of us how the system works and what its players are like. Savva manages to do so without talking down to her readers or sounding full of herself."

Writing for Inside Story, Matthew Ricketson said of the book "Particularly welcome is the fact that Savva has persuaded so many of her interviewees to speak on the record" and also said "Savva has a gift for the pithy summation."

== Awards ==
- 2023, Australian Political Book of the Year, won
- 2023, BookPeople Non-fiction Book of the Year, won
- 2023, Australian Book Industry Awards General Non-fiction Book of the Year
- 2023, ACT Book of the Year Award, shortlisted
