= Earthquake (book) =

2025 book by Niki Savva

Earthquake: the election that shook Australia
- Author: Niki Savva
- Working title: Earthquake: Signposts to the election that shook Australia
- Subject: 2025 Australian federal election
- Publisher: Scribe
- Publication date: 22 November 2025
- Media type: Print and digital
- Pages: 432
- Award: 2026 Australian Booksellers Association Book of the Year (shortlisted)
- ISBN: 978-1-761-38189-8
- Preceded by: Bulldozed: Scott Morrison's fall and Anthony Albanese's rise
- Website: scribepublications.com.au/books/earthquake

Earthquake: the election that shook Australia is a 2025 book by Australian journalist Niki Savva. The book was published by Scribe and chronicles events of the 2025 Australian federal election. Savva has previously written three other books covering events during the Liberal–National Coalition's terms in office from 2013 to 2022.

== Background ==
Journalist Niki Savva worked in the offices of former prime minister John Howard and former treasurer Peter Costello, and previously wrote three other books on the Liberal–National Coalition's terms in office from 2013 to 2022, these books were titled The Road to Ruin: How Tony Abbott and Peta Credlin Destroyed Their Own Government, Plots and Prayers: Malcolm Turnbull's Demise and Scott Morrison's Ascension, and Bulldozed: Scott Morrison's fall and Anthony Albanese's rise. The book was originally titled Earthquake: Signposts to the election that shook Australia.

== Content ==
In Earthquake, Savva examines factors that led to the Liberal Party's comprehensive defeat and the Labor Party's gains in the 2025 Australian federal election. The book consists of Savva's columns from The Sydney Morning Herald and The Age before it delves into details of how the 2025 election played out.

The book details the surprise faced by the Liberal Party of the tax cuts announced in the 2025 budget and their MPs' confusion on which way to vote regarding the cuts. The book tells of Dutton's opinion that the tax cut "didn't matter" and his ultimate decision to repeal the tax cut legislation. The book tells of Dutton's relationship with then-shadow defence minister Andrew Hastie, with Dutton claiming that Hastie "was lazy". The book says that Dutton personally vetoed a suggestion from Hastie to create a joint defence intelligence committee to focus on the AUKUS pact that had the support of senior government officials, Dutton disliked the plan as he feared that the committee would consist of Greens and independent MPs.

== Reception ==
Writing for The Conversation, journalist Mark Kenny praised the breadth of content included in the book with its wide-ranging testimonies, he also said that the book is "an important account" with insights featured from "both sides of the fence".

=== Awards ===
The book was shortlisted for the Australian Booksellers Association Book of the Year prize.
