= Clanchy =

Clanchy is a surname. Notable people with the surname include:

- John Clanchy (born 1943), Australian novelist and short story writer
- Kate Clanchy (born 1965), Scottish poet, freelance writer, and teacher
- Michael Clanchy (1936–2021), British medievalist

== See also ==
- Clancy
