= The Low Road =

The Low Road may refer to:

- The Low Road (novel), 2007 novel by Chris Womersley
- The Low Road (play), 2013 play by Bruce Norris
