= Cairo (novel) =

2013 novel by Chris Womersley

- First edition
- Author: Chris Womersley
- Language: English
- Publisher: Scribe
- Publication date: 2013
- Publication place: Australia
- Pages: 304
- ISBN: 9781925106626
- OCLC: 850395771

Cairo is a 2013 novel by Australian author Chris Womersley. It is Womersley's third novel and it takes its name from the location where the protagonist lives, in the heritage listed Cairo Flats apartment block that is located in the Melbourne suburb of Fitzroy. The novel also features a number of actual places and venues around Fitzroy, and on Brunswick Street, from the Punters Club, The Black Cat Cafe, Polyester Records and Rhumbarellas.

The novel is presented as a reminiscence of "Tom Button", a boy from rural Victoria who inherits an apartment in Cairo from a bohemian aunt of his. Throughout the story, no specifics are given as to which apartment number Tom lives in, but based on the descriptions in the book and former residents experiences of living there, the only plausible possibility is that Tom lives in unit 20.

Whilst living in the building Tom meets Max and Sally Cheever, a couple who also live at Cairo, in unit 28. Through Max and Sally, Tom is introduced to a wider circle of bohemian artists and musicians, which draws him into more sinister events. The centrepiece of the story is inspired by the real theft of The Weeping Woman from the National Gallery of Victoria in 1986. No one has ever publicly admitted being involved in the theft or been charged by police.

The novel also had a limited international release. The UK edition of the book featured a different cover to the Australian edition. The French edition of the book featured a different cover, as well as a different title. In France, the book was released as "La Compagnie des artistes" (A Company of Artists).
