= Roland Sussex =

Australian linguist

Roland Denis Sussex OAM, also known as Roly Sussex, is an Australian linguist. He is the Emeritus Professor of Applied Language Studies at the School of Languages and Comparative Cultural Studies of the University of Queensland in Brisbane, Queensland. Sussex hosts a talkback program on language and linguistics on ABC radio in Queensland, Tasmania, South Australia and the Northern Territory and writes a weekly column, "Wordlimit", for The Courier-Mail newspaper.

Sussex is a specialist in comparative linguistics, particularly of European languages, and takes an interest in the Slavic languages within this group. He is also keenly interested in the changes experienced by different languages, such as the influence of American English on Australian English. He holds a PhD from the University of London in Russian Language and Comparative Linguistics.

He is an honorary life member of the Alliance française and patron of the Institute of Professional Editors.

He is an editorial board member of the journal Intercultural Communication Studies. Sussex was Professor of Russian at the University of Melbourne between 1974 and 1989.

Sussex was the Chair of the Library Board of Queensland at State Library of Queensland from 2009 until 2014.

== Publications ==
- Sussex, Roland; Cubberley, Paul (2006). The Slavic Languages. Cambridge: Cambridge University Press. ISBN 978-0-521-22315-7.
- Kirkpatrick, Andy; Sussex, Roland, eds. (2012). English as an International Language in Asia: Implications for Language Education. Berlin and London: Springer-Verlag. ISBN 978-94-007-4578-0, 9789400745773.
- Curtis, Andy; Sussex, Roland, eds. (2018). Intercultural Communication in Asia: Education, Language and Values. Berlin and London: Springer-Verlag. ISBN 978-3-319-69995-0, 9783319699950.
- Sussex, Roly (2020). Word for Today. St Lucia: University of Queensland Press. ISBN 9780702264627.
