= Bereft =

Bereft may refer to:

- Bereft (film), 2004 American television film
- Bereft (TV series)
- Bereft (novel)
