= Theft of The Weeping Woman from the National Gallery of Victoria =

Theft of painting created by Pablo Picasso

The National Gallery of Victoria's Weeping Woman
- Artist: Pablo Picasso
- Year: 1937
- Medium: Oil on canvas
- Dimensions: 55 cm × 46 cm (22 in × 18 in)
- Location: National Gallery of Victoria, Melbourne

The theft of The Weeping Woman from the National Gallery of Victoria took place on 2 August 1986 in Melbourne, Victoria, Australia. The stolen work was one of a series of paintings by Pablo Picasso all known as The Weeping Woman and had been purchased by the gallery for A$1.6 million in 1985—at the time the highest price paid by an Australian art gallery for an artwork. A group calling itself "Australian Cultural Terrorists" claimed responsibility, making a number of demands (and insults) in letters to the then-Victorian Minister for the Arts, Race Mathews. The demands included increases to funding for the arts; threats were made that the painting would be destroyed. After an anonymous tip-off to police, the painting was found undamaged in a locker at Spencer Street railway station on 19 August 1986. The theft still remains unsolved.

== The painting ==
After painting Guernica, Pablo Picasso created a series of works depicting one of the figures in the work, a weeping woman. The model for these works was his mistress Dora Maar. The definitive work in the series is in the collection of the Tate Modern in the United Kingdom.

One of the series was painted on 18 October 1937, and is oil on canvas, 55 centimetres by 46 centimetres. While the painting at the Tate Modern is in bright reds, blues and yellows, the 18 October work has been described as "an unsettling combination of acid greens and vibrant mauves exaggerated by thick black outlines". This is the painting that was purchased by the National Gallery of Victoria in 1985 for A$1.6 million.

Before the National Gallery of Victoria bought its Weeping Woman, the highest price paid by a major gallery in Australia for a painting was for Jackson Pollock's Blue Poles, which was purchased by the National Gallery of Australia in 1973 for A$1.3 million. Commenting on the purchase of The Weeping Woman, director of the National Gallery of Victoria Patrick McCaughey said its recent acquisition is "the most expensive purchase by any Australian gallery", and, "This face is going to haunt Melbourne for the next 100 years." In 2016, the National Gallery of Victoria's Weeping Woman has been reported as valued by Sotheby's as worth A$100 million.

== The theft ==
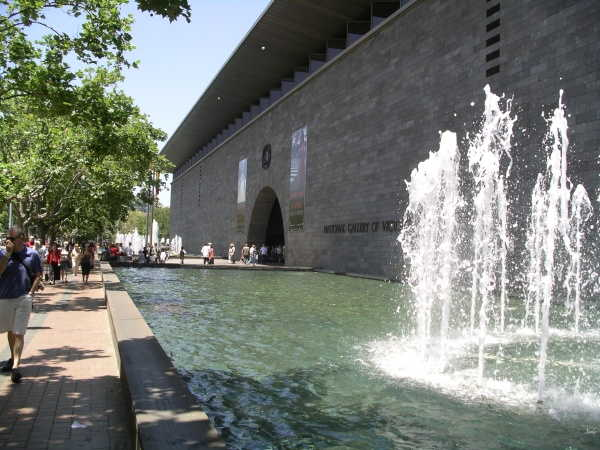
View looking south towards the public entrance of the National Gallery of Victoria

On Saturday, 2 August 1986, thieves obtained access to the National Gallery of Victoria and unscrewed the painting from its wall mounting. They removed the mounted canvas from its frame and left the gallery undetected. McCaughey stated that a specialised type of screwdriver, not available to the public, would have been required to take the painting off the wall. It has been suggested that the thieves knew their art history: the method of the theft was an ironic homage to the 1911 theft of the Mona Lisa from the Louvre. (In 1911, Picasso and his contemporary Guillaume Apollinaire were both suspects in the Mona Lisa theft, but were cleared of any association with the crime.)

The theft of The Weeping Woman was not noticed until Monday, 4 August 1986. The thieves had left a card indicating that the painting had been removed for routine maintenance. Staff had assumed that "ACT" on the card – the initials of the "Australian Cultural Terrorists" – referred to the Australian Capital Territory, and that the painting had been transferred to the National Gallery of Australia in Canberra. Initially it was suspected that the crime might have been perpetrated by a gang of international art smugglers, and the possibility of an "inside job" was not considered.

The painting itself was not insured. Then-Arts Minister Race Mathews noted that the price of insurance was prohibitive for such major works of art.

=== Demands and insults ===
ATTENTION: RANK MATHEWS (MLA)

We have stolen the Picasso from the National Gallery as a protest against the niggardly funding of the fine arts in this hick State and against the clumsy, unimaginitive stupidity of the administration and distribution of that funding.
Two conditions must be publicly agreed upon if the painting is to be returned.
1. The Minister must announce a commitment to increasing the funding of the arts by 10% in real terms over the next three years, and must agree to appoint an independent committee to enquire into the mechanics of the funding of the arts with a view to releasing money from its administration and making it available to artists.
2. The Minister must announce a new annual prize for painting open to artists under thirty years of age. Five prizes of $5000 are to be awarded. A fund is to be established to ensure that the real value of the prizes is maintained each year. The prize is to be called The Picasso Ransom.
Because the Minister of the Arts is also Minister of Plod, we are allowing him a sporting seven days in which to try to have us arrested while he deliberates. There will be no negotiation. At the end of seven days if our demands have not been met the painting will be destroyed and our campaign continue.
Your very humble servants,

Australian Cultural Terrorists

— "The Ransom Letter", The Age, 5 August 1986

Dear, oh dear. Race Mathews, you tiresome old bag of swamp gas...

1. We have not dumped the painting in a blue-nosed funk. What should have caused us to panic? Perhaps you imagine that the news that Interpol has been alerted will cause us to cower in our ill lit garrots awaiting the inevitable knock on the door as the relentless Clouseaux of a hundred nations stalk us. What an imaginative fellow you turned out to be. Interpol! Call on Red Adair to read your gas meter, do you?
2. We hope you enjoy playing the political he-man, unflinchingly refusing the outrageous demands of these cultural crackpots. You continue flexing your political pectorals before an admiring electorate for as long as you can, Minister. Seven days after the painting came into our hands (Sat 2nd Aug. 10.00PM) if our demands have not been met you will begin the long process of carrying about you the smell of kerosene and burning canvas. You are gambling the State's two million dollar investment in the Picasso industry against our twenty cent investment in Bryant & May. Mind you, we do find your Conan the Barbarian routine terribly diverting.
3. The people of Australia, and you as one of their elected representatives, should rejoice that a theft involving less risk than shoplifting cotton hankies from David Jones was performed by a group whose first desire is to return the painting. Not that we would really expect such a sensible reaction from someone so determined to have others shoulder the blame. The responsibility is entirely yours. Good luck with your huffing and puffing, Minister, you pompous fathead. We remain
Your very humble servants,

Australian Cultural Terrorists

— The second ransom note to the Melbourne Herald, The Canberra Times, 10 August 1986

The "Australian Cultural Terrorists" wrote two letters to Mathews, who was addressed as "Rank Mathews". The first letter demanded that funding for the arts be increased by ten per cent over a three-year period. The thieves also demanded that an art prize be set up, worth A$25 000 and to be called "The Picasso Ransom" prize, or for five separate prizes to be awarded to young Australian artists. The thieves communiqués were loaded with insults; the first letter referred to Mathews, who was also Police Minister, as "Minister of Plod", while the second letter described him as a "tiresome old bag of swamp gas" and a "pompous fathead". The second letter also threatened that if the demands were not met, the painting would be burnt.

=== Official responses ===
The Victorian government refused to accept any of the demands and offered a A$50,000 reward for information leading to the capture of the perpetrators. Mathews was reported as saying: "I can't imagine that anybody who had genuinely at heart the interests either of art or of art lovers could have perpetrated an action of this sort." McCaughey was reported to have said, "We live in a philistine nation but a civilised city."

=== Recovery ===
In his 2003 memoir, The Bright Shapes and the True Names, McCaughey wrote that, a few days before the painting was recovered, a Melbourne art dealer called him to say that a young artist may know something about the theft. When he visited the artist's studio, McCaughey writes, he made a point to say that he was interested in the return of the painting, not a conviction for the crime: "I said deliberately, at least twice, that the people who had taken the work could deposit it in a luggage locker at Spencer Street railway station or at Tullamarine Airport."

Two days later, on 19 August 1986, following an anonymous phone call to police, the painting was found undamaged and carefully wrapped in brown paper tied with string in locker number 227 at Spencer Street station. The locker was opened with a station staff master key. Police stated that the painting was packed in such a way as to ensure that it would not be damaged, suggesting "quite possibly someone in the art world or on the fringes of the art world." McCaughey himself later formally identified the painting.

A third letter from the "Australian Cultural Terrorists" was included with the work. Its content was not initially released to the public. An extract printed in The Age read:

Of course we never looked to have our demands met ... Our intention was always to bring to public attention the plight of a group which lacks any of the legitimate means of blackmailing governments.

=== Closure of crime investigation ===
On 11 January 1989, The Age reported that the case had been closed, and no further investigations would be made into the theft until solid evidence was presented that any persons, including gallery staff, were involved in the theft.

=== Contemporary reactions to the theft ===
In August 1986, while the painting was yet to be recovered, then-Australian Treasurer Paul Keating was caricatured in a political cartoon as the "Weeping Woman", his cause of sorrow being the 1986 Federal Budget.

According to McCaughey, "a philistine piece" was written by B. A. Santamaria at around the same time, which urged that if the "Australian Cultural Terrorists" had in fact destroyed Picasso's work, they be awarded the Order of Australia.

A columnist in The Age commented that the thieves had "nicked Picasso's Weeping Woman from McCaughey Mansions", a reference to an old radio program, "McCackie Mansion", involving Mo McCackie, a character created by the late comedian, Roy Rene.

Chilean Australian artist Juan Davila painted a work titled Picasso Theft and offered to donate it to the National Gallery of Victoria in place of the stolen painting. Davila wrote that "mine is a real one". Davila's Picasso Theft was exhibited in the Sydney Avago Gallery, and then itself was stolen.

== Legacy ==
The crime was described in 2009 as "still Australia's greatest unsolved art heist". In 2010, in the context of a theft of an entire private collection worth A$2 million and the theft of a Frans van Mieris self-portrait valued at A$1.4 million from the Art Gallery of New South Wales in 2004, it was referred to as "most famous art heist in Australia".

On the 20th anniversary of the theft, Australian online magazine Crikey described the thieves as "more than likely just a bunch of naughty boys" and that it was regarded by some in the arts community as a work of "performance art" and a political act in response to the "cultural cringe".

In 2011, John Brack's Collins St., 5 pm was voted the most popular work in the collection of the National Gallery of Victoria. The Weeping Woman was the fourth most popular. The work itself was described in 2012 as "the National Gallery of Victoria's much-loved Weeping Woman".

=== Film and television ===
The 1990 film A Kink in the Picasso was a 'comic and entirely fabricated drama' based on the painting's theft. 'Comedy is always difficult,' wrote reviewer John Mangan, 'even when the most unlikely aspect of the plot - the remarkable ease with which a group of young artists can sneak paintings worth millions of dollars out of art galleries - is based in fact.'

The Australian Film Commission funded a documentary by Melbourne independent filmmakers Colin Cairnes and Catherine Dyson about the theft entitled The Picasso Ransom. The film was shown at the 23rd St Kilda Film Festival in 2006. A search was made for Spencer Street station's locker 227, where the painting was found, which supposedly was taken with others to a regional rail facility, but it had been replaced and could not be located. Since the time of the theft, Spencer Street station has been totally rebuilt and now renamed Southern Cross station. None of the buildings which housed services and facilities for travellers at that date now exist, although the platforms and a now generally inaccessible underground walkway between platforms still exist.

Commencing in late 2021, Framed, a four-part television documentary about the theft presented by Marc Fennell is currently available on Australian broadcaster Special Broadcasting Service's SBS on Demand video on demand service.

=== Novels ===
Stealing Picasso, Australian writer Anson Cameron's fifth novel, published in 2009, was based on the incident. It includes entirely fictional narrative as well as fictionalised references to actual people and events.

Cairo, a 2013 novel by Australian writer Chris Womersley about life in inner-city Melbourne uses the theft as a theme to describe its narrator's introduction into the bohemian lives of its other characters.

The Guy, the Girl, the Artist and his Ex, a 2016 young adult novel by Gabrielle Williams, is a fictional story centered around the theft. While researching for the novel, Williams says that she "interviewed a number of people, some of who may or may not have been the actual Australian Cultural Terrorists".

=== Security measures ===
In 2012, the work was shown as part of "Theatre of the World", a joint exhibition of the Museum of Old and New Art and Tasmanian Museum and Art Gallery, alongside works by Giacometti, Kandinsky, Basquiat, Ernst and Hirst. Museum of Old and New Art staff were not informed of the whereabouts or identity of the work, with a then reported value of up to $50 million, until it was in place.

=== Humour ===
The end of a disappointing 2012 AFL season for Australian football team Essendon Football Club was illustrated by a description of there being two well-known weeping figures within walking distance of each other in Melbourne: Essendon coach James Hird at the Melbourne Cricket Ground as well as "the famous one at the National Gallery of Victoria".
