= Anthony Hill (author) =

Australian author based in Canberra (born 1942)

- Born: 1942 (age 83–84); Melbourne, Victoria, Australia
- Education: University of Melbourne
- Occupations: Author, journalist, speechwriter
- Writing career
- Notable works: Young Digger, Soldier Boy, Birdsong, The Burnt Stick
- Notable awards: CBCA Honour Book (Young Digger, Soldier Boy)
- Website: anthonyhillbooks.com

Anthony Hill (born 1942) is an Australian author based in Canberra.

Born in Melbourne, Victoria, he attended the University of Melbourne from 1960 until 1963 and then worked as a journalist at the Melbourne Herald before joining the Parliamentary Press Gallery in 1972. In 1977 he left the Press Gallery to run an antique shop near Yass, which he did for the next six years. From 1989 until 1999 he was a speech writer for the Australian governors-general William Hayden and Sir William Deane. He has written twelve books, with Young Digger and Soldier Boy winning prizes.

== Select publications ==
- Hill, Anthony; Watts, Kay (1996). Birdsong. Oxford University Press. ISBN 978-0-19-554900-3.
- Hill, Anthony (1996). The Burnt Stick. Illustrated by Mar Sofilas. Puffin Books. ISBN 978-0-14-036929-8.
- Hill, Anthony (1998). Spindrift. Illustrated by Mar Sofilas. Puffin Books. ISBN 978-0-14-037843-6.
- Hill, Anthony (2001). Soldier Boy. Penguin Random House Australia. ISBN 978-1-74228-312-8.
- Hill, Anthony (2002). Forbidden. Illustrated by Mar Sofilas. Puffin Books. ISBN 978-0-14-131125-8.
- Hill, Anthony (2002). Young Digger. Penguin Books. ISBN 978-0-141-00062-6.
- Hill, Anthony (2005). Animal Heroes: Thrilling Stories of Animals Who Have Worked and Played Alongside Australia's Fighting Forces. Penguin Books. ISBN 978-0-143-00380-9.
- Hill, Anthony (2007). Lucy's Cat and the Rainbow Birds. Illustrated by Jane Tanner. Penguin Australia. ISBN 978-0-670-02916-7.
- Hill, Anthony (2008). Captain Cook's Apprentice. Penguin Books Australia. ISBN 978-0-143-00482-0.
