= Niki Savva =

Australian journalist

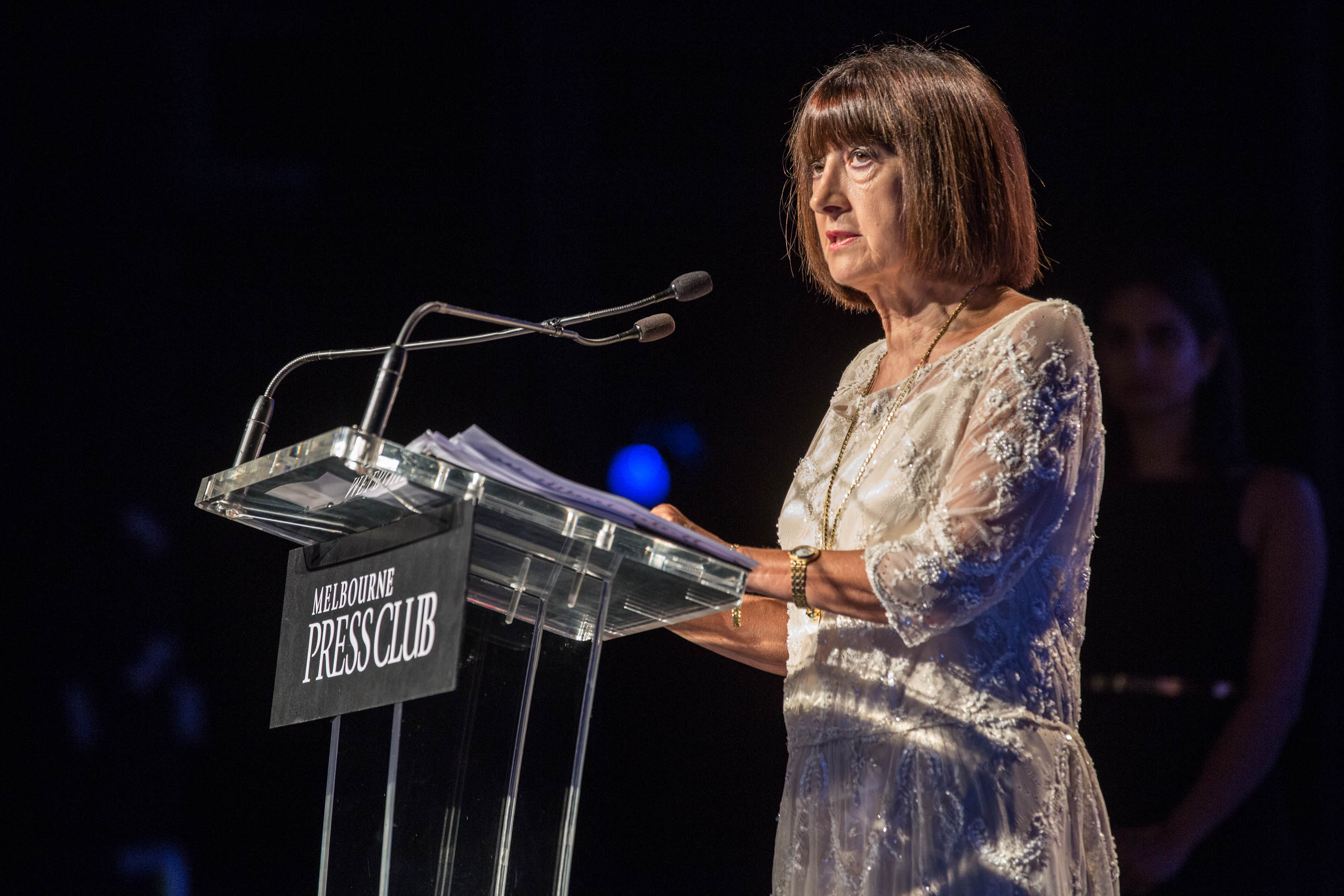
- Savva accepts Melbourne Press Club Lifetime Achievement Award, March 2017
- Born: Choli, Cyprus
- Citizenship: Australian
- Occupations: Journalist, political staffer

Niki Savva is an Australian journalist, author, and former senior adviser to prime minister John Howard and treasurer Peter Costello.

== Early life ==
Savva was born in the village of Choli, Cyprus. Her father Andreas emigrated to Melbourne, Australia in 1951 and she followed with her mother Elpiniki and brother Steven several years later. She grew up in Doveton, an outer suburb of Melbourne. She attended Doveton Primary and Doveton High School where she was a prefect.

== Career and personal life ==
Savva started work as a journalist at the Dandenong Journal, before moving to The Australian newspaper. In her early twenties, she moved to Canberra to work as a correspondent in the Canberra press gallery, for The Australian and later for the Herald Sun and The Age. She also worked as the Washington correspondent for News Limited.

The illness and death of her sister Christina at 43 caused Savva to reconsider her career in journalism in 1997, and she accepted a job offer from federal treasurer Peter Costello as his media advisor. She worked for Costello for six years before joining the staff of prime minister John Howard for three years on Howard's Cabinet Policy Unit.

She resigned from The Australian in June 2021 when the paper opted to commission a column from Peta Credlin to run on the same day as Savva's and started working at The Age and The Sydney Morning Herald the following month. Savva appears regularly as a panelist on the ABC's Insiders program.

Savva is married to Vince Woolcock, a Liberal political staffer.

== Political views ==
In a book about her time as an adviser to Peter Costello, and then to John Howard, Savva described herself as a "conservative leftie". On the Liberal side of politics, she supported Costello's leadership ambitions, over those of the more conservative Howard, and, later, Malcolm Turnbull's leadership ambitions over those of Tony Abbott.

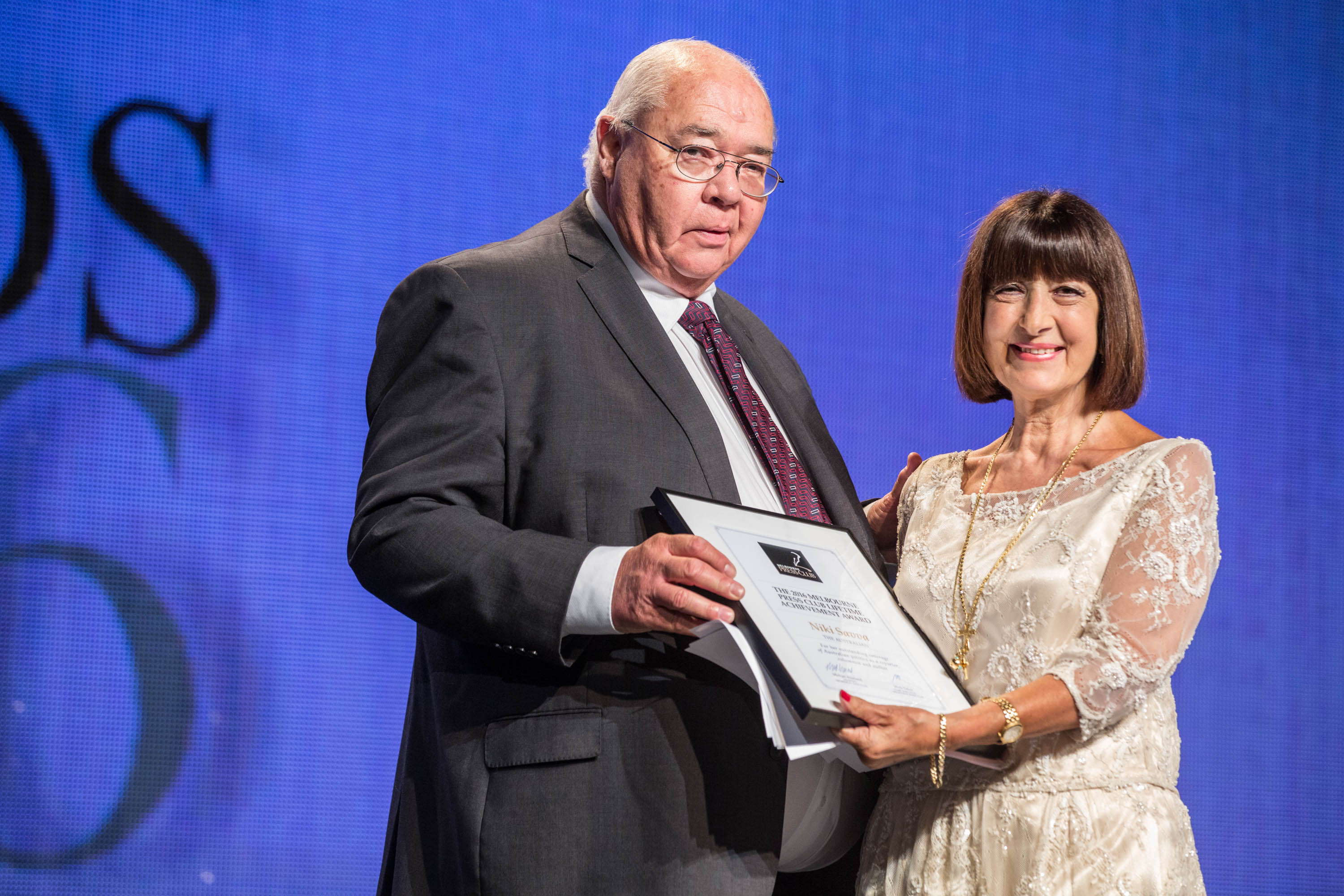
Laurie Oakes presents Savva with Melbourne Press Club Lifetime Achievement Award

According to journalist Laurie Oakes, Savva said in 2011 that journalists can lie, but politicians should not: "As a journalist, I lied often, usually about my sources, but about other things, too. Journalists can and do get away with lying; politicians and staff can't. Nor should they."

In 2016, Savva released the book The Road to Ruin: How Tony Abbott and Peta Credlin Destroyed Their Own Government outlining the fall of the Abbott government, relating it to Abbott's closeness to his chief of staff, Peta Credlin. Savva was criticised by Abbott and Credlin, several journalists, and the ABC's Media Watch for not contacting the subjects of her book for comment on its claims, or giving them a right of reply. Michael Gawenda wrote in The Sydney Morning Herald: "It is a terrific book, but that's not the point here. The point is that Savva does not rely on anonymous sources for her examination of the relationship between Abbott and Peta Credlin. Her sources are named. They speak for themselves. We know who they are and where they worked and we know the terms and circumstances of their relationships with Abbott or Credlin."

The Road to Ruin won the 2017 Australian Book Industry Award (ABIA) for General Non-fiction Book of the Year. Savva won the Adult nonfiction prize at the 2023 Book of the Year Awards and the Australian Political Book of the Year for Bulldozed.

== Books ==
Date first published	Title	Publisher information	Sales	Source
22 November 2010	So Greek: Confessions of a Conservative Leftie	Scribe, paperback, ISBN 1-92164-083-9	—N/a	
7 March 2016	The Road to Ruin: How Tony Abbott and Peta Credlin Destroyed Their Own Government	Scribe, paperback, ISBN 1-92532-140-1	34,000 (as of August 2016)	
2 July 2019	Plots and Prayers: Malcolm Turnbull's Demise and Scott Morrison's Ascension	Scribe, paperback, ISBN 9781925849189		
1 December 2022	Bulldozed: Scott Morrison's fall and Anthony Albanese's rise	Scribe, ISBN 978-1-922585-98-1, OCLC 1341674943		
2025	Earthquake: the election that shook Australia	Scribe Publications, paperback, ISBN 978-1-7613-8189-8		
