= Jane Tanner =

Australian illustrator

Barbara Jane Tanner
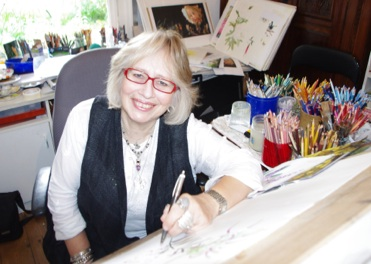
- Jane Tanner, at her studio desk, in Melbourne Australia.
- Born: 29 November 1946 (age 79); Melbourne, Australia
- Other name: Jane Tanner
- Occupation: Children's book illustrator
- Known for: 1989 Children's Book of the Year Award: Picture Book

Barbara Jane Tanner, known as Jane Tanner, (born 29 November 1946 in Melbourne) is an Australian children's book illustrator.

Majoring in painting and printmaking at the National Gallery School, Melbourne, she worked as a traditional artist for many years. She won the 1989 Children's Book of the Year Award: Picture Book award from the Children's Book Council, illustrating Allan Baillie's book Drac and the Gremlin.

== Career ==
She taught school in Victoria before becoming an illustrator. Tanner often uses soft pastels, watercolours and gouache, but is best known for her use of coloured pencils. Over 25 years Jane has created more than 13 picture books including some written by herself, and numerous book covers.

== Publications ==
=== As illustrator ===
- The Storm Whale, written by Sarah Brennan (Allen & Unwin) (2017)
- Lucy’s Cat and the Rainbow Birds, written by Anthony Hill (Penguin Books) (2007)
- The Fisherman and the Theefyspray written by Paul Jennings (Penguin Books) (1994)
- The Wolf, written by Margaret Barbalet (Penguin Books) (1991)
- Making Lunch, written by Frances James (Macmillan) (1989)
- Drac and the Gremlin, written by Allan Baillie (Penguin Books) (1988)
- There’s a Sea in My Bedroom, written by Margaret Wild (Penguin Books) (1984)
- Time for a Rhyme, with Marjory Gardner and Heather Philpot (Thomas Nelson) (1982)

=== As author/illustrator ===
- Lily and the Fairy House (Penguin Books) (2012)
- Love from Grandma (Penguin Books) (2010)
- Just Jack (Penguin Books) (2008)
- Ride with Me (Penguin Books) (2006)
- Isabella’s Secret (Penguin Books) (2004)
- Playmates (Penguin Books) (2002)
- Niki’s Walk (wordless picture book, Thomas Nelson) (1987)

=== As editor ===
- Sandy's Shadow by Garry Hurle (Omnibus Books) (1994)

== Awards and nominations ==
- Albert Ullin Award 2022
- On Selection List, Family Award for Children's Books for "Love from Grandma" 2011
- Notable book, CBC for "Love from Grandma" 2011
- Cool Award - Shortlist for "Lucy's Cat and the Rainbow Birds" 2008
- CBC Book Awards, Early Childhood - Shortlist for "Playmates" 2003
- Christian Schools Book Award for "The Fisherman and the Theefyspray" 1998 (winner)
- Wilderness Society Environment Award for "The Fisherman and the Theefyspray" 1994 (winner)
- Human Rights Award 1992 for "The Wolf" (winner)
- CBC Awards-Younger Readers-Shortlist for "The Wolf" 1992
- Victorian Premiers Award-Shortlist for "Drac and the Gremlin" 1989
- CBC Picture Book of the Year 1989 for "Drac and the Gremlin" (winner)
- Kate Greenaway Medal-Shortlist for "There's a Sea in my Bedroom"1985
- CBC Picture Book Award - Shortlist for "There's a Sea in my Bedroom" 1985
- Frequent Shortlistings for Yabba Awards.
