= The Wolf (picture book) =

Book by Margaret Barbalet illustrated by Jane Tanner

- Author: Margaret Barbalet
- Illustrator: Jane Tanner
- Language: English
- Genre: Children's picture book
- Published: 1991 (Penguin Books)
- Publication place: Australia
- Media type: Print (hardback)
- Pages: 30 (unpaginated)
- ISBN: 9780670836147
- OCLC: 959302188

The Wolf is a 1991 Australian children's picture book by Margaret Barbalet and Jane Tanner. It is about a family that is terrorised by a wolf over a number of months but upon allowing it into their house realise that it means no harm.

== Publication history ==
- 1991, Australia, Penguin Books ISBN 9780670836147
- 1992, USA, Macmillan ISBN 9780670836147

== Reception ==
A review in Kirkus Reviews described The Wolf as "An allegory concerning fear, with an almost painfully dark, heavy atmosphere.." while a Publishers Weekly review concluded "Though this unusual book may not be for all tastes, its stark drama makes a vivid impression."

The Wolf has also been reviewed by School Library Journal

It won the 1992 Australian Human rights Award for Literature in Children's Fiction, was shortlisted for the 1992 CBCA Early Childhood Book Award, and is a 1993 AISLE Read-Aloud Books Too Good to Miss book.
