= Anson Cameron =

Australian author (born 1961)

Anson Cameron is a Melbourne-based Australian author, born in Shepparton in 1961.

His first published book was a collection of short stories, Nice Shootin' Cowboy. It was short-listed for a Commonwealth Writers' Prize in 1997. A short film Nice Shootin' Cowboy was based on the work.

His fifth book Stealing Picasso, published in 2009, is a fiction based around the actual theft of one of Pablo Picasso's The Weeping Woman series of paintings from the National Gallery of Victoria in 1986.

He is a columnist for The Age.
