= Carl Bridge =

Australian historian

- Born: 1950 (age 75–76); Sydney, New South Wales

Academic background
- Education: University of Sydney (BA [Hons]); Flinders University (PhD, DipEd)
- Thesis: The British Conservative Party and All-India Federation, 1927–40 (1977)

Academic work
- Institutions: King's College London (1997–); University of New England (1983–97); Flinders University (1977–81)
- Notable students: Paul Burns, Tim Causer, Richard Farrimond, John Ferry, Dan Foley, Glyn Harper, Jatinder Mann, Melanie Oppenheimer, David O’Reilly, Bart Zielinski
- Main interests: Australian political and diplomatic history; British imperial history; military history

Carl Bridge (born 1950) is an Australian historian, academic, and professor emeritus of Australian History at King's College London.

== Biography ==
Carl Bridge was born in Sydney and attended Fort Street Boys’ High School. He is a graduate of the University of Sydney and Flinders University. He taught at Flinders and the University of New England, and was director of the Menzies Centre for Australian Studies, King's College London from 1997 to 2014. He has been a fellow of Clare Hall, Cambridge; Churchill College, Cambridge; the Australian Prime Ministers' Centre; and the National Library of Australia. He is also a fellow of the Royal Historical Society. Bridge is a former co-editor of London Papers in Australian Studies and Reviews in Australian Studies. He often speaks and writes on Australian matters in the British and international media. He is currently co-writing with Jatinder Mann and Bart Zielinski a documentary history of Anglo-Australian relations 1914–19. A Festschrift in his honour, “Reflecting on the British World”, edited by Jatinder Mann and Bart Zielinski, was published in 2024.

== Selected publications ==
- Revolution: A History of the Idea. London: Croom Helm, 1985. (Edited with David Close).
- Holding India to the Empire: the British Conservative Party and the 1935 Constitution. New Delhi: Sterling; London: Oriental, 1986.
- A Trunk Full of Books: A History of the State Library of South Australia and its forerunners. Adelaide: Wakefield, 1986.
- Munich to Vietnam: Australia's Relations with Britain and the United States since the 1930s. Melbourne: Melbourne University Press, 1991. (Edited).
- Manning Clark: Essays on his Place in History. Melbourne: Melbourne University Press, 1994. (Edited).
- Between Empire and Nation: Australia's External Relations from Federation to the Second World War. Melbourne: Australian Scholarly, 2000. (Edited with Bernard Attard).
- The British World: Diaspora, Culture, Identity. London: Frank Cass, 2003. (Edited with Kent Fedorowich).
- A Delicate Mission: The Washington Diaries of R. G. Casey, 1940–42. Canberra: National Library of Australia, 2008. (Edited).
- William Hughes: Australia. London: Haus Publishing, 2011.
- Australia and the United Kingdom 1960–1975. Canberra: Department of Foreign Affairs and Trade, 2010. (Edited with S.R. Ashton & Stuart Ward)
- The High Commissioners. Australia’s Representatives in the United Kingdom, 1910–2010. Canberra: Department of Foreign Affairs & Trade, 2010. (Edited with Frank Bongiorno & David Lee).
- Australia Goes to Washington: 75 years of Australian representation in the United States, 1940–2015. Canberra: ANU Press, 2016. Edited with David Lowe and David Lee).
