= Institute of Professional Editors Limited =

Professional association in Australia and New Zealand

Institute of Professional Editors (IPEd)
- Founded: 2008
- Type: Not-for-profit limited by guarantee
- Locations: Aotearoa New Zealand, New South Wales, Queensland, South Australia, Tasmania, Victoria, Western Australia
- Region served: Australia
- Members: c. 1300
- Official languages: English
- Employees: 5 (part-time)
- Website: iped-editors.org
- Formerly called: Council of Australian Societies of Editors (CASE)

The Institute of Professional Editors Limited (IPEd) is the editors' association of Australia and New Zealand. It aims to promote the profession of editing in these countries, support the work of its member editors, and maintain high standards for editing practice.

IPEd has seven branches: Editors Aotearoa New Zealand, Editors NSW, Editors Queensland, Editors SA, Editors Tasmania, Editors Victoria, and Editors WA. Each branch runs professional development and networking programs, while the governing body manages the IPEd Accreditation Scheme, a biannual conference, a register of freelance editors, a mentoring program and other activities.

The institute has operated since 2008, following a 10-year process that brought the originally separate, mostly state-based, societies of editors together under one umbrella. In 2016, it became a direct membership association of editors with centralised operations. The institute is a not-for-profit company limited by guarantee, governed by a board that comprises one representative from each of its seven branches.

== History ==
The first society of editors in Australia was founded in 1970 in Melbourne, Victoria, partly in response to the withdrawal of publishers from providing inhouse training for editors. To ensure editors could find appropriate training, the society ran courses and workshops and provided networking opportunities for its members. From the late 1970s, the society published the Freelance Register to assist publishers to find freelance editors. Over more than a decade, the society worked closely with RMIT University to establish in 1988 Australia's first postgraduate editing course.

Societies of editors with similar aims and activities were also established in NSW (1978), Queensland (1990), Western Australia (1992), Canberra (1992), South Australia, and Tasmania.

The societies maintained loose ties with each other until 1998, when they established the Council of Australian Societies of Editors (CASE), which represented the independent societies at the nationwide level. In 2001, CASE published the first edition of the Australian Standards for Editing Practice, which sets out core editing standards, the skills editors require, and what publishers should expect from editors. Also in 2001, CASE developed the first guidelines for editing research theses together with the Australian Council of Graduate Research. CASE also oversaw Australia's first national editors conference, in Brisbane in 2003.

Over the following five years, the societies of editors undertook research and consultations to replace CASE with the Institute of Professional Editors (IPEd). However, it was not until 2016 that IPEd became a direct membership organisation, with branches no longer being independent, and planning, budgets and communications becoming centralised. The Canberra Society of Editors chose not to join IPEd, and the Aotearoa New Zealand branch joined in 2019.

== Major activities ==
=== Awards ===
- The Janet Mackenzie Medal (the Mackenzie)
- The Rosanne Fitzgibbon Editorial Award (the Rosie)
- IPEd Prize
- Beatrice Davis Editorial Fellowship
- Barbara Ramsden Award

==== Past Winners of the Rosie ====
The Rosanne Fitzgibbon Editorial Award ('the Rosie', after how Rosanne was known) honours the memory of Rosanne Fitzgibbon (1947–2012), a distinguished editor and recipient of the inaugural Beatrice Davis Editorial Fellowship in 1992.

The Rosie recognises excellence in editing, as demonstrated in one work, with testimony from author, publisher and editor. The Rosie was inaugurated in 2017 with the winner announced at the 8th IPEd National Editors Conference.

| Year | Editor | Publisher | Work | Author | Work Published |
|---|---|---|---|---|---|
| 2017 | Jacqueline Blanchard | UQP | All Fall Down | Matthew Condon | 2015–2016 |
| 2019 | Julia Carlomagno | Scribe | Adult Fantasy | Briohny Doyle | 2017–2018 |
| 2021 | Johannes Jakob | Penguin Random House | The Bluffs | Kyle Perry | 2019–2020 |
| 2023 | Cathy Vallance | UQP | The Way of Dog | Zana Fraillon | 2021–2022 |

=== IPEd Accreditation Scheme ===
The IPEd Accreditation Scheme aims to establish a level of competency among editors to benefit both editors and publishers. Candidates are expected to complete an examination that tests editorial skills and knowledge, and, on attaining accreditation, provide evidence of ongoing professional development. Successful candidates are entitled to use the postnominal "AE" and "IPEd Accredited Editor" in their professional profiles.

=== Biennial national editors conference ===
A national editors conference has been held every two years since 2003, and is managed and hosted by each branch in turn.

=== Professional development ===
In addition to the conferences, each branch of IPEd runs its own professional development activities, including seminars, workshops and courses.

=== Mentoring ===
IPEd runs a national mentoring scheme in which mainly beginning editors are match with experienced editing mentors. Mentoring can take the form of general career advice or specific editorial training.

== Publications ==
- Freelance Register, from late 1970s, The Society of Editors (Victoria) Inc, Carlton South, Victoria.
- Barker, Anthony, 1991, One of the First and One of the Finest: Beatrice Davis, Book Editor, The Society of Editors (Victoria) Inc., Carlton South, Victoria.
- Mackenzie, Janet (ed.), 2005, At the Typeface: Selections from the Newsletter of the Victorian Society of Editors, Society of Editors (Victoria) Inc, Carlton South, Victoria.
- Biram, Kerry, Brown, Diane, Craig, Jenny & Owen, Wendy, 2009, Editors in Conversation 2, The Society of Editors (Victoria) Inc, Carlton South, Victoria.
- Australian Standards for Editing Practice, 2nd edition, 2013, Institute of Professional Editors Limited.
- Guidelines for Editing Research Theses, 2019, Institute of Professional Editors Limited.
- Inclusive Publishing in Australia: An Introductory Guide, 2019, Australian Inclusive Publishing Initiative (joint project of All Equal, IPEd and other organisations)
- Gatherings: The IPEd Newsletter, April 2020–, Institute of Professional Editors Limited.

== See also ==
- Australian and New Zealand Society of Indexers
- Board of Editors in the Life Sciences (US)
- Council of Science Editors (US)
- Editors' Association of Canada
- European Association of Science Editors (France)
