= John Henry Dowse =

Australian rugby union player

John Dowse
- Born: John Henry Dowse; 27 March 1935 (age 91) Mackay, Queensland

Rugby union career
- Position: fly-half
International career
Years	Team	Apps	(Points)
1961	Wallabies	4	(25)

John Henry Dowse (born 27 March 1935) was a rugby union player who represented Australia.

Dowse, a fly-half, was born in Mackay, Queensland and claimed a total of 4 international rugby caps for Australia.

He was married to the author Sara Dowse from 1958 to 1977. They have three sons and a daughter.
