= The Trojan Dog =

Book by Dorothy Johnston

- Front cover of The Trojan Dog (2000 hardcover edition)
- Author: Dorothy Johnston
- Language: English
- Series: Sandra Mahoney
- Genre: Crime Fiction
- Publisher: Wakefield Press
- Publication date: 2000
- Publication place: Australia
- Pages: 268 pp
- ISBN: 1-86254-486-7
- Dewey Decimal: 823/.914
- Followed by: The White Tower

The Trojan Dog is a detective fiction novel by Australian author Dorothy Johnston. It is the first novel in the Sandra Mahoney series. Published in 2000 in Australia, and in North America in 2005, The Trojan Dog was one of the first Australian novels to give electronic crime a central place.

== Plot summary ==
The novel is set in Canberra in the months leading up to the 1996 Australian Federal election. Sandra Mahoney has been out of work for some years, raising her son Peter. Now that he is in school full-time, Mahoney returns to the work force and is hired by Rae Evans, head of the Australian Labor Relations Service Department Industries Branch.

A sum of $900,000 is stolen, and Evans is accused. The theft requires a certain expertise in computer technology, which Mahoney is convinced Rae Evans does not have. Mahoney is assisted by one of the department's IT staff, an eccentric, shambling Russian called Ivan Semyonov. Along the way Mahoney gradually learns some of the basics about computer crime. As the investigation into Evans and the theft progresses, Mahoney enlists the aid of an ACT detective sergeant, DS Brook, who is himself suffering from leukaemia.

Mahoney and her team meet a cast of mad public servants, each of whom is, in one way or another, a suspect; these include Bambi, a wordless child-woman who always wears a red cape, and Felix, another IT person, only ever encountered rushing into the department in his jogging shorts. Mahoney and Semyonov finally set a trap and catch the real thief.

== Themes ==
The atmosphere of paranoia that Canberra finds itself in, in the waiting time before an election, is important for the story. A change of government, with its accompanying change in policies, often means bureaucratic upheaval – government employees are redeployed or made redundant, and entire departments are restructured or scrapped.

== Awards ==
- Joint winner of 2001 ACT book of the year, with The Schoonermaster's Dance by Alan Gould.
- Runner-up in the 2001 Davitt Award.
- "Best of 2000, crime section" by The Age Newspaper, Melbourne.

== Reviews ==
The Trojan Dog is a subtle absorbing piece about an ordinary woman who is deeply affected by what she uncovers in others and herself. Johnston is an exceptionally good writer.

— The Age

A delightful protagonist, a fabulous support cast who make the office seem real, and a fantastic look at Canberra.

— Harriet Klausner, MBR Bookwatch

Johnston’s literary, character-driven crime debut explores white collar corruption as well as a modern woman’s personal transformation.

— Publishers Weekly
