= Lovers' Knots =

1992 novel by Australian writer Marion Halligan

Lovers' Knots : A Hundred-Year Novel
- Author: Marion Halligan
- Language: English
- Genre: Fiction
- Publisher: Heinemann
- Publication date: 1992
- Publication place: Australia
- Media type: Print
- Pages: 372 pp.
- Awards: The Age Book of the Year Awards Best Fiction and Book of the Year, 1992
- ISBN: 0855614552
- Preceded by: Spider Cup
- Followed by: Wishbone

Lovers' Knots : A Hundred-Year Novel (1992) is a novel by Australian writer Marion Halligan. It was originally published by Heinemann in Australia in 1992.

== Synopsis ==
The novel follows the lives of Ada Gray, who arrives in Australia from England as an immigrant in the early twentieth century, and her descendants.

== Dedication ==
- Dedication: For my sisters Brenda and Rosanne

== Publishing history ==
After its initial publication in Australia by Heinemann in 1992, the novel was reprinted as follows

- Minerva, Australia 1993
- Mandarin, Australia, 1993 and 1996

== Critical reception ==
Writing in The Canberra Times reviewer Helen Elliott noted: "This is not a novel to be devoured, nor to be read at one sitting. It is to be savoured from the front cover to the measured conclusion which does not want to talk about happy endings, but is prepared to be eternally hopeful about happy beginnings. Lovers' Knots will be read with shouts of recognition — and murmurs of pleasure."

== Awards ==
- The Age Book of the Year Awards Best Fiction, winner 1992
- The Age Book of the Year Awards Book of the Year, winner 1992
- Nita Kibble Award winner 1994

== Notes ==
- In The Canberra Times Robert Hefner interviewed the author about the novel.

== See also ==
- 1992 in Australian literature
