= Frank Bongiorno =

Australian historian, academic and author

Frank Bongiorno AM FASSA FAHA
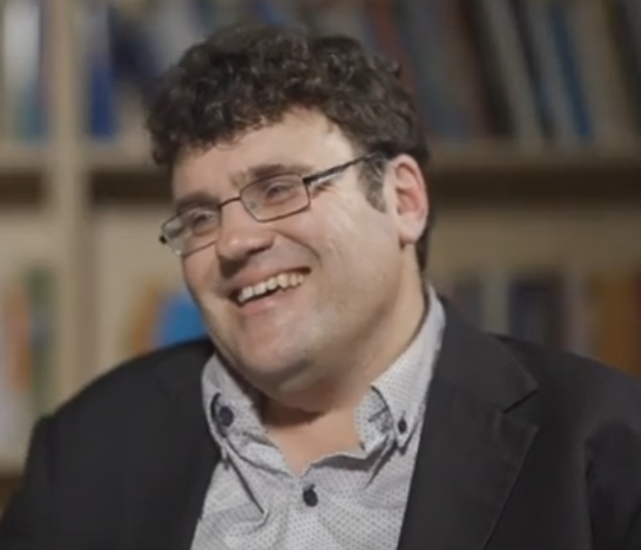
- In a discussion on the Australian economy in 2019
- Born: 1969 (age 56–57); Nhill, Victoria, Australia
- Occupation: Historian
- Awards: Fellow of the Royal Historical Society (2010); ACT Book of the Year (2013, 2016, 2023); Fellow of the Academy of the Social Sciences in Australia (2017); Member of the Order of Australia (2019); Fellow of the Australian Academy of the Humanities (2019)

Academic background
- Education: University of Melbourne (BA [Hons]); Australian National University (PhD)
- Thesis: Labour and Politics in Victoria, 1885–1914 (1994)
- Doctoral advisor: Ken Inglis

Academic work
- Institutions: University of Canberra; Australian National University; King's College London; University of New England; Griffith University
- Notable students: C. J. Coventry
- Main interests: Labour, Australian political and cultural history
- Notable works: The Sex Lives of Australians: A History (2012); The Eighties: The Decade That Transformed Australia (2015)

Francis "Frank" Robert Bongiorno (born 1969) is an Australian historian, academic and author. He was a professor of history at the Australian National University. He joined the University of Canberra in 2026 as the inaugural Director of the Vice-Chancellor's Centre of Public Ideas and the Donald Horne Professor of History and Public Ideas.

== Personal life and education ==
Bongiorno was born in Nhill, Victoria, to a working class family of two children. He moved Melbourne in the 1970s, attending a junior school in the northern suburbs. Bongiorno attended Parade College in Bundoora from 1981 to 1986 and was a contemporary of future Greens leader, Richard Di Natale. At school, Bongiorno was a member of the student representative committee and was awarded the prize for 'school spirit'. Bongiorno received an undergraduate honours degree from the University of Melbourne and doctorate from the Australian National University (ANU). Originally, he intended to be a school teacher, which was "the highest ambition I had ever been encouraged to conceive." However, his postgraduate research at ANU shifted his ambition to historical research and teaching. At ANU he received a stipendiary scholarship, which he credits for having kept him "out of the workforce" during the recession of the early 1990s.

Bongiorno's father died in November 1982, when he was 14 years old. Bongiorno's partner is Nicole Tamara McLennan, with whom he has a daughter, Amy. McLennnan is a curator and historian who received her PhD from ANU in 1998 and has since worked for the National Centre of Biography, specialising in Victorian history.

== Early career ==
As a student of Stuart Macintyre's, Bongiorno is part of the fifth generation of historians of the Scott lineage, a teacher-undergraduate student line stretching back to the beginning of Australian historiography: Macintyre was taught by Geoffrey Blainey, who was taught by Manning Clark, who was taught by Ernest Scott.

Bongiorno lectured at ANU in 1994, was a research officer in the Department of Foreign Affairs and Trade in 1995, and lectured at Griffith University in 1996. He then was an Australian Research Council postdoctoral in 1997, was Smuts Visiting Fellow in Commonwealth Studies at the University of Cambridge and Mellon Visiting Fellow at the University of Texas at Austin in 1997–1998, and returned to his ARC fellowship from 1998 to 2000.

== Academic career ==
Bongiorno lectured at the University of New England from 2000 to 2007, King's College London from 2007 to 2011 and then at Australian National University (ANU) as an associate professor from 2011 to 2016 before being promoted to professor. Bongiorno devoted himself to reviewing, editing and writing, publishing a large number of academic articles. He became a Fellow of the Royal Historical Society, the Academy of the Social Sciences in Australia, and the Australian Academy of the Humanities.

He joined the University of Canberra in February 2026 as the inaugural Director of the Vice-Chancellor's Centre of Public Ideas and the Donald Horne Professor of History and Public Ideas.

=== Public commentary ===
Bongiorno has been a frequent contributor to Inside Story, The Conversation and The Monthly. Bongiorno was appointed a Member of the Order of Australia in the 2019 Australia Day Honours in recognition of his "significant service to tertiary education in the field of history."

Bongiorno, who is a republican, has expressed doubt about Australia becoming a republic under the reign of King Charles III: "I don't see any easy road ahead. Even if there is a shift in public opinion towards the idea of a republic, as there might be, the problem of the detail will remain a barrier, as it did in 1999. In my view, any method of selection that doesn't involve some kind of popular vote will never gain majority support. On the other hand, there are many republicans - some very well-placed in terms of access to public platforms - who believe popular election will undermine or even undo parliamentary democracy. These differences could not be bridged in 1998-99. I remain to be convinced they can be almost a quarter of a century on... [There is a] tradition whereby politicians proclaim the republic inevitable while always finding reasons to put it off until the week after never".

On the state of present-day Australian politics, Bongiorno says "Today, our democracy suffers from the systematic marginalisation of those who do not aspire, and cannot realistically aspire, to the profession of politics. But serious social and political change needs dreamers, visionaries, and thinkers – and perhaps even the occasional prophet and ratbag." He believes the election of the Albanese Government could be historic: "In the year of the fiftieth anniversary of the election of the Whitlam government, the 2022 election arguably saw the most significant shift towards a progressive politics since that time." Of Anthony Albanese himself, Bongiorno disputes his image as an outsider, writing that he was in fact a "very modern species: the student politician who came to parliament via a career as a political staffer and party official."

=== Scholarship ===
Bongiorno's first book, The People's Party: Victorian Labor and the Radical Tradition 1875–1914 was positively reviewed by The Australian, which described it as a "solid historical work", as was his second, A Little History of the Australian Labor Party, which was described as "fascinating" and "plainly expressed".

Bongiorno achieved greater recognition with his third book, The Sex Lives of Australians: A History, described as "serious" but "lively and engaging" by the Daily Telegraph, "highly readable, serious history about our most intimate yet most culturally sensitive selves" by the Canberra Times, while Sydney Morning Herald wrote that it "affords Australian sexuality a much-needed centrality in terms of explaining and understanding the evolution of our society and of our culture" and The Advertiser wrote that "[Bongiorno] barges into the bedrooms of our forebears to show us a rarely seen side of their lives". It was short-listed for the 2013 Prime Minister's Literary Awards and won the ACT Book of the Year award. It was later reported that his book had been the judges' recommendation for the Prime Minister's awards, but had been personally overturned by Kevin Rudd as "unacceptable".

Bongiorno's fourth book, The Eighties: The Decade That Transformed Australia was described by The Australian as "meaty and entertaining" and by The Age as a "rattling account, quick-cut and filmic, of contrasting, often overlapping, events: high and low culture, the big moments nestling in the finer long-forgotten detail". Author Tom Keneally described it as an "elegantly written and imaginative recounting of the time", historian Clare Wright as having "narrative flair and an eagle-eye for vulgar detail", while conservative columnist Gerard Henderson labelled it a "one-sided dumb history". The Eighties also won the ACT Book of the Year award.

His 2022 book, Dreams and Schemers, was shortlisted for the Australian History Prize at the 2023 New South Wales Premier's History Awards and won the 2023 ACT Book of the Year.

== Bibliography ==
=== Author ===
- — (1996). The People's Party: Victorian Labor and the Radical Tradition, 1875–1914. Carlton, Victoria: Melbourne University Press. ISBN 0522847382.
- —; Dyrenfurth, Nick (2011). A Little History of the Australian Labor Party. Kensington, New South Wales: University of New South Wales Press. ISBN 9781742232843.
- — (2012). The Sex Lives of Australians: A History. Collingwood, Victoria: Black Inc. ISBN 9781863955676.
  - — (2015). The Sex Lives of Australians: A History (2nd ed.). Collingwood, Victoria: Black Inc. ISBN 9781863957076.
- — (2015). The Eighties: The Decade That Transformed Australia. Collingwood, Victoria: Black Inc. ISBN 9781863957762.
- — (2022). Dreamers and Schemers: A Political History of Australia. Collingwood, Victoria: Black Inc. ISBN 9781760640095.

=== Editor ===
- —; Bridge, Carl; Lee, David, eds. (2010). The High Commissioners: Australia's Representatives in the United Kingdom, 1910–2010. Barton, Australian Capital Territory: Department of Foreign Affairs and Trade. ISBN 9781921612107.
- —; Jones, Benjamin T.; Uhr, John, eds. (2018). Elections Matter: Ten Federal Elections That Shaped Australia. Clayton, Victoria: Monash University Publishing. ISBN 9781925523157.
- —; MacCallum, Mungo, eds. (2023). The Good, the Bad and the Unlikely: Australia's Prime Ministers: From Barton to Albanese. Clayton, Victoria: Black Inc. ISBN 9781760644789.
