= The Low Road (novel) =

Book by Chris Womersley

- First edition
- Author: Chris Womersley
- Language: English
- Genre: Novel
- Publisher: Scribe Publications, Melbourne
- Publication date: 2007
- Publication place: Australia
- Media type: Print Paperback
- Pages: 280 pp
- ISBN: 978-1-921215-47-6 (first edition, paperback)
- OCLC: 174109815
- Followed by: Bereft

The Low Road is a 2007 Ned Kelly Award-winning novel by the Australian author Chris Womersley.

== Awards ==
- Victorian Premier's Literary Award, Prize for an Unpublished Manuscript by an Emerging Victorian Writer, 2006: shortlisted
- Ned Kelly Awards for Crime Writing, Best First Novel, 2008: winner

== Notes ==
- Dedication: "For my mother, my brother and my sister, who know something of the roads I have travelled."
- Epigraph: "A man's character is his fate." - Heraclitus, On the Universe.
- Epigraph:

"And what the dead had no speech for, when living
They can tell you, being dead: the communication
Of the dead is tongued with fire beyond the language of the living." - T.S.Eliot, Little Gidding.

== Reviews ==
- Swinn, Louise (October 17, 2007). "The Low Road". The Age.
- "The Australian"
- "Australian Crime Fiction Database"
- "First Tuesday Book Club"
- "Readings"
