= Bereft (novel) =

Book by Chris Womersley

- First edition
- Author: Chris Womersley
- Language: English
- Genre: Novel
- Publisher: Scribe Publications, Melbourne
- Publication date: 2010
- Publication place: Australia
- Media type: Print Paperback
- Pages: 264 pp
- ISBN: 9781921640605 (first edition, paperback)
- Preceded by: The Low Road
- Followed by: Cairo

Bereft is a 2010 novel by the Australian author Chris Womersley.

== Plot summary ==
In 1919 the First World War is over and Spanish Flu is at epidemic proportions in Australia. Quinn Walker returns from the war to the small town of Flint to face the consequences of his sister's killing, ageing parents and a police constable who is intent on blaming him for the death.

== Awards ==
- 2012 longlisted International Dublin Literary Award
- 2012 shortlisted The National Year of Reading 2012 Our Story Collection — New South Wales
- 2012 shortlisted Crime Writers' Association (UK) — The CWA Gold Dagger
- 2011 winner Indie Book Awards Book of the Year – Fiction
- 2011 shortlisted Miles Franklin Literary Award

== Notes ==
- Dedication: For Roslyn, who always believed.
- Epigraph: Every angel is terrible - Rainer Maria Rilke, The Duino Elegies

== Reviews ==
- Australian Crime Fiction
- Kill Your Darlings
- The Sydney Morning Herald
