= Rosanne Fitzgibbon =

Australian literary editor

Rosanne (Rosie) Fitzgibbon (1947–2012) was a literary editor in Australia. She worked for forty years in the publishing of fiction and non-fiction, including as fiction editor at the University of Queensland Press from 1989 to 2005. She worked in collaboration with many of Australia's best-known authors including Thea Astley, Peter Carey, Kate Grenville, and Janette Turner Hospital. Her papers are held in the Fryer Library at the University of Queensland.

In 2017 Editors Queensland and the Institute of Professional Editors established the Rosanne Fitzgibbon Award (also known as "the Rosie") in her honour to recognise the editor of a specific book.

== Edited works ==
- The gift of story: three decades of UQP short stories (1998)
- One book many Brisbanes : an anthology of Brisbane stories (2006)
