= John Clanchy =

Australian novelist and short story writer

- Born: 1 August 1943 (age 83); Melbourne
- Education: Critical and Creative Writing
- Occupation: Author
- Spouse: Brigid Ballard (m. 2015)
- Writing career
- Language: English
- Genre: Fictional prose
- Notable awards: Queensland Premier's Literary Awards (2005); Australian Capital Territory Book of the Year (2003 and 2006)

John Clanchy (born 1 August 1943) is an Australian novelist and short story writer.

== Biography ==
John Clanchy was born in Melbourne in 1943 but has lived in Canberra since 1975. Prior to taking up fiction writing full-time, he worked for more than two decades at the Australian National University as head of an academic advisory center for students and, later, as Foundation Director of the Graduate Teaching Program in the university’s Graduate School. Together with his colleague and partner, Brigid Ballard, he is the author of many articles and textbooks on academic writing, study, teaching and research, and cross-cultural education.

== Career ==
John Clanchy has published seven novels and five collections of stories and novellas. He is best known for his long stories which have won a large number of regional, state and international awards. He has been the recipient of an Australia Council Writing Fellowship, a panelist at all of the major State Literary Festivals, a teacher of creative writing at a number of centers and retreats here and in France, and has published many uncollected stories in magazines and newspapers. He has also published a number of poems and had two award-winning plays performed under various pseudonyms.

One collection of his stories, Vincenzo’s Garden, won a total of seven awards, including the ACT Book of the Year and the Steele Rudd Award (Queensland Premier’s Literary Award for Short Fiction), both in 2006. His novel The Hard Word was also awarded the ACT Book of the Year (2003), and his latest novel In Whom We Trust was shortlisted for the same prize (2021).

He has written two crime novels, If God Sleeps and And Hope to Die (co-authored with Mark Henshaw under the pseudonym J.M. Calder), which have appeared with Penguin Viking in Australia, Gallimard in France and Rowohlt in Germany – the last becoming a German bestseller and Book Club edition.

Clanchy is "widely acknowledged as a master of the short literary form."

== Bibliography ==
=== Novels ===
- Breaking Glass (University of Queensland Press, 1992)
- The Hard Word (University of Queensland Press, 2002)
- Lessons from the Heart (University of Queensland Press, 2003)
- SISTERS (La Muse Books (France), e-kindle (Amazon.com), 2018. Print version, La Muse Books (limited edition) 2022)
- In Whom We Trust (Finlay Lloyd, 2019)

==== As J.M. Calder ====
- If God Sleeps (Penguin/ Penguin/Gallimard/Rowohlt, 1997)
- And Hope to Die (Penguin/Gallimard/Rowohlt, 2007)

=== Short stories ===
- Lie of the Land (Pascoe Publishing, 1985)
- Homecoming (University of Queensland Press, 1989)
- Vincenzo’s Garden (University of Queensland Press, 2005)
- Her Father’s Daughter (University of Queensland Press, 2008)
- Six (Finlay Lloyd, 2014)

== Awards ==
Australian

- 2003 ACT Book of the Year, The Hard Word
- 2006 Queensland Premier's Literary Awards, Australian Short Story Collection – Arts Queensland Steele Rudd Award, Vincenzo's Garden
- 2006 ACT Book of the Year, Vincenzo's Garden

International

- The Commonwealth Literature and language Studies Prize (Europe)
- The Antipodes Prize for Short Fiction (US)
- The PEN Air-NZ Prize
