= Chris Womersley =

Australian writer

- Born: 1968 (age 57–58); Melbourne, Victoria
- Writing career
- Language: English
- Years active: 1998-
- Notable work: The Low Road
- Notable awards: Ned Kelly Awards 2008

Chris Womersley (born 1968 in Melbourne, Victoria) is an Australian author of crime fiction, short stories and poetry. He trained as a radio journalist and has travelled extensively to such places as India, South-East Asia, South America, North America, and West Africa. He lives in Melbourne.

== Awards ==
- 1998, The Australian Short Story Competition: commended for "Men and Women"
- 2006, Victorian Premier's Literary Award, Prize for an Unpublished Manuscript by an Emerging Victorian Writer: shortlisted for The Low Road
- 2007, Josephine Ulrick Literature Prize: winner for "The Possibility of Water"
- 2008, Ned Kelly Awards for Crime Writing, Best First Novel: winner for The Low Road
- 2011, ALS Gold Medal: shortlisted for Bereft
- 2011, Miles Franklin Award, shortlisted for Bereft

== Bibliography ==
=== Novels ===
- The Low Road (2007)
- Bereft (2010)
- Cairo (novel) (2013)
- City of Crows (2017)
- The Diplomat (2022)
- Ordinary Gods and Monsters (2023)

=== Short stories ===
- A Lovely and Terrible Thing (2019)
