= Dorothy Johnston =

Australian author (born 1948)

- Born: 1948 (age 77–78); Geelong, Victoria
- Writing career
- Language: English
- Years active: 1975-
- Notable work: One for the Master

Dorothy Johnston (born 1948) is an Australian author of both crime and literary fiction. She has published novels, short stories and essays.

Born in Geelong, Victoria, Australia, Johnston trained as a teacher at the University of Melbourne and later worked as a researcher in the education field. She lived in Canberra from 1979 to 2008, and currently lives in Ocean Grove, Victoria (Australia). She is a former President of Canberra PEN. She was a founding member of the Seven Writers Group, also known as Seven Writers or the Canberra Seven, established in March 1980. Five of the original members ceased with the group, but Johnston and Margaret Barbalet continued with new writers.

She was a member of Writers Against Nuclear Arms, with her novel Maralinga, My Love, focusing on the impacts of nuclear testing in Australia.

== Awards and grants ==
- 1987 - shortlisted Miles Franklin Award for Ruth
- 1988 - highly commended ABC / ABA Bicentennial Literary Award for Maralinga, My Love
- 1988 - Australia Council fellowship
- 1991 - ACT Literary Award (grant) to complete a book of stories about life in Canberra
- 1998 - shortlisted Miles Franklin Award for One for the Master
- 2001 - joint winner ACT Book of the Year for The Trojan Dog
- 2001 - highly commended Davitt Award for The Trojan Dog

== Bibliography ==
=== Novels ===
Her books include the Sandra Mahoney quartet of mystery novels.

==== Sandra Mahoney series ====
- The Trojan Dog (2000)
- The White Tower (2003)
- Eden (2007)
- The Fourth Season (2014)

==== Sea-Change Mystery series ====
- Through a Camel's Eye (2016)
- The Swan Island Connection (2017)

==== Standalone novels ====
- Tunnel Vision (1984)
- Ruth (1986)
- Maralinga, My Love (1988)
- One for the Master (1997)
- The House at Number 10 (2005)

=== Short stories ===
- "The New Parliament House" and "The Boatman Of Lake Burley Griffin", published in Canberra Tales: Stories (1988) (reprinted as The Division of Love: Stories, 1995); Below the Water Line (1999) and The Invisible Thread, A Hundred Years of Words (2012)
- "A Christmas Story", published in Motherlove (1996)
- "Two Wrecks", published in Best Australian Stories (2008) and Best Australian Stories: A Ten-year Collection (2011)
- "Quicksilver's Ride", published in Best Australian Stories (2009)

Essays

- "Female Sleuths And Family Matters: Can Genre and Literary Fiction Coalesce?", published in Australian Book Review (2000)
- "A Script With No Words", published in HEAT New Series 1 (2001)
- "Disturbing Undertones", published in The Griffith Review (2007)
- "But when she was bad...", published in The Australian Literary Review (2008)
- "The sounds of silence", published in The Age (2009)
- "Fiction's ever present danger", published in Spectrum (January 2011)
