= Sara Dowse =

American-born Australian public servant and writer

- Born: Dale Sara Rosenthal; 12 November 1938 (age 87); Chicago, Illinois, United States
- Occupations: Author, critic, social commentator, and visual artist

Sara Dowse (nee Dale Sara Rosenthal; born 12 November 1938) is an American-born Australian feminist, author, critic, social commentator, and visual artist.

== Career ==
Dowse was an Australian federal government public servant in Canberra, the inaugural head of the first women's unit in the Department of Prime Minister and Cabinet, and oversaw the unit's growth from a section to an office. Dowse held this position from 1974 to 1977, under two prime ministers (Edward Gough Whitlam and John Malcolm Fraser)), and resigned in protest of the office's removal from the prime minister's department.

Her first novel, West Block, is based on her experiences in government, and was one of the first works of fiction set in Australia's capital Canberra.

Dowse's other novels include Schemetime, published in 1990; Sapphires; and As the Lonely Fly. She has also contributed reviews, articles, essays, stories, and poetry to a range of print and online publications. She posted a blog, Charlotte is Moved with political, social and artistic themes, from 2013 to 2016.

== Personal life ==
Dowse was born Dale Sara Rosenthal in Chicago on 12 November 1938. Her mother, Louise Fitch, was a radio actor, and her father, Jerome Bernard Rosenthal, was an attorney. Her parents divorced before her father was drafted in 1942. A lieutenant, he served in the Pacific as an army pilot and received a Purple Heart.

In 1947, Dowse's mother remarried, to scriptwriter Jerry D. Lewis, and the family moved to Los Angeles. Dowse attended El Rodeo School in Beverly Hills, Emerson Junior High School, and University High School in West Los Angeles. During this period, Dowse's mother and stepfather were blacklisted as a result of McCarthyism.

After graduating from high school in June 1956, Dowse enrolled at the University of California at Los Angeles (UCLA) the following September and took voice lessons after her classes. During the summer of 1957 she met John Dowse, an Australian from Sydney who was attending UCLA on a rugby union scholarship. In May 1958, they married. Pregnant with their first child, Sara agreed to move to Sydney. They in Sydney on October 1958. They had three children, born in Australia.

The Dowses moved to Canberra in 1968, separated in 1972 and divorced in 1977. Dowse married Tony Taylor in 1996. Two years later, they went to British Columbia and settled in the small fishing town of Sidney on Vancouver Island. They returned to Australia in 2004, and were living in Manly, New South Wales when Taylor died in 2015.

== Education and career ==
Three months after Joseph's birth, Dowse enrolled in night classes at Sydney University. She continued her studies intermittently between children, and passed the last course for her Bachelor of Arts degree at the Australian National University (ANU) after the family moved to Canberra.

Dowse's first job after graduation was Canberra field editor for publisher Thomas Nelson Australia. Part of her brief time at Nelson was spent searching for potential manuscripts at ANU's Institute of Advanced Studies and School of Asian Studies, and she met two research assistants who were members of the women's liberation group that had begun in the capital. Dowse began attending meetings and was swept up by the movement, abandoning a law course to devote her free time to activism. Like other feminists, she wrote discussion papers and spoke in public about the need for wide-ranging social change for women. In 1972, after Sara and John separated, she began tutoring in the professional-writing course at the Canberra College of Advanced Education (now the University of Canberra). The position was part-time (like the Nelson job); to support herself and her children, she joined the Australian News and Information Bureau (ANIB) and applied for Australian citizenship. Dowse was obligated to renounce her U.S. citizenship, since dual citizenship was not an option in either country at the time.

The first election in which she voted was in December 1972. Under the new Whitlam Labor government, the ANIB became the Australian Information Service (AIS). Elizabeth Reid, a tutor in the ANU philosophy department, became Gough Whitlam's prime-ministerial adviser on women in April 1973, a global first. At Reid's recommendation, Dowse was seconded to the staff of minister for labor and immigration Clyde Cameron to write speeches on equal pay, child care and part-time employment. Her major speech for Cameron outlined his support for extending the adult minimum wage to women; the female minimum wage had been substantially lower than the male minimum since the 1907 Harvester case). The following year, with the government's support and a Women's Electoral Lobby submission, the Arbitration Commission ruled in a landmark decision to make the minimum wage equal for women and men.

Although Dowse returned to the AIS, she was soon appointed head of the new women's affairs section in the prime minister's department. The section provided bureaucratic support for Elizabeth Reid, dealing with her correspondence and advising her on the wide range of policy matters of special concern to women. When Reid resigned in October 1975 (not long before the Whitlam government's dismissal), the section was upgraded to a branch, with Dowse its acting head.

After the Coalition was elected, with Malcolm Fraser the new prime minister, Dowse's expectation of remaining head of the women's-affairs branch was low. However, it was a public service position (not a political one) and the department decided to appoint her to the position. Under Dowse, the branch was upgraded to an office and many reforms initiated under Whitlam were saved; some, like refuge funding, child care, and establishing a government machinery for women, improved. Dowse wanted to write, though, and decided that she would resign from the service when she was no longer useful in her role. In 1977, she was interviewed by Biff Ward about how feminism changed her life on the program This is Your Changing Life on Canberra's 2XX FM.

== Writing ==
In December 1977, Dowse's office was removed from Fraser's department. Her resignation in protest of the removal attracted more media attention than she had received as a public servant; her position required a low profile, and she had always believed that public servants were most effective behind the scenes.

Dowse was part of the Seven Writers Group, also known as Seven Writers or the Canberra Seven. A single mother, she wrote West Block when her youngest child Sam was an infant and it was published in 1983. Although it was a moderate commercial success, Dowse was still short of money. She and Patricia Giles contributed the essay "Women in a Warrior Society" to the 1984 anthology Sisterhood Is Global: The International Women's Movement Anthology, edited by Robin Morgan.

She wrote her second novel, Silver City, to coincide with the release of the film. Penguin's first novelisation, Dowse's contract gave her a free hand in developing the film's story about Polish emigrants to Australia and she finished the novel in eight months. She was interested in learning about the film industry in preparation for her third novel, Schemetime, about an Australian filmmaker in Hollywood.

Dowse assisted the local Majura Women's Group in Canberra with publishing a short-story anthology in 1993. With her fourth novel, Sapphires, she received the most critical acceptance. The Australian Capital Territory’s Book of the Year in 1995, it was on the Australian long list for the Impac Dublin Prize. Sapphires was based on her grandmother’s family, who had emigrated to the United States from present-day Belarus at the end of the nineteenth century. A fifth novel, Digging, revisited some of West Block's themes from a single mother’s perspective, although "while there are common threads in Dowse's novels, each is stylistically different from the others". As the Lonely Fly (2017), Dowse's sixth novel, is a family saga reaching from 1904-1967, based around the lives of three Jewish women, two sisters and a niece, who migrate from Russia to the US and Israel. It has been described as "a tour de force", "embracing a complex topic with nuance and humanity".

== Oral-history archive ==
On a 1991 National Library Harold White fellowship for preliminary research for what became As the Lonely Fly, Dowse was invited to begin an oral-history archive on the Australian women's movement. About 50 interviews have been collected since then, most conducted by Dowse. She has also contributed to the Library's AIDS and publishing archives, and has begun interviewing Americans who have settled in Australia.

== Art ==
In British Columbia, while working on As the Lonely Fly, Dowse produced prints composed on her computer with an early Adobe Photoshop program and then began painting in watercolour and acrylic. When she returned to Australia in 2004, she continued her art. In addition to pieces sold in Canada, Dowse's works have been shown in exhibitions at the Warringah Creative Space in 'EMERGE - A collective exhibition' (2015); the Left Hand Gallery in Braidwood; the Red Olive Artspace in Balgowlah (2013); the Underground ARTspace in Balgowlah; the Manly Art Gallery and Museum in 'Keeping Company with the Collection' (2013), in which selected artists were invited to respond to one of the art works in the Gallery's permanent collection; and the Nishi Gallery in Canberra.

== Bibliography ==
=== Novels ===
- West Block: The Hidden World of Canberra's Mandarins (1984)
- Silver City (1984)
- Schemetime (1990)
- Sapphires (1994)
- Digging (1996)
- As the Lonely Fly (2017)

=== Selected short stories, articles and other contributions ===
- "My Cousin Paolo", published in Canberra Tales: Stories (1988)
- "The voices of women". National Library of Australia News]. 17 (12): 19–21. September 2007. Archived from the original on 19 January 2012.
- Correspondence in The Prince: Faith, Abuse and George Pell (2013)

== Sources ==
- "From Lady Denman to Katy Gallagher: A Century of Women's Contributions to Canberra". Australian Women’s Archives Project. February 2013.
- Adelaide, Debra, Australian Women Writers: A Bibliographic Guide. London, Sydney: Pandora Press, 1988.
- Dowse, Sara. "A Femocrat's Story, 1970s Style". Griffith Review (28: Still the Lucky Country?).
- Dowse, S. (February 2015). "The Prime Minister's Women". Australian Feminist Studies. 29 (82): 391–402. doi:10.1080/08164649.2014.966939. S2CID 144583843.
- Eisenstein, Hester (1996). Inside Agitators: Australian Femocrats and the State. Philadelphia: Temple University Press.
- Ellison, Jennifer (1986). Rooms of Their Own. Penguin. ISBN 9780140092189.
- Franzway, S.; Court, D.; Connell, R. W. (1989). Staking a Claim: Feminism, Bureaucracy and the State. Sydney: Allen & Unwin.
- Gelder, K.; Salzman, P. (1989). The New Diversity: Australian Fiction 1970-1988. Melbourne: McPhee Gribble.
- Henderson, Margaret (2006). Marking Feminist Times: Remembering the Longest Revolution in Australia. Peter Lang.
- Henderson, M.; Bartlett, B., eds. (2013). Things that Liberate: An Australian Feminist Wunderkammer. Cambridge Scholars Publishing.
- Lake, Marilyn (1999). Getting Equal: The History of Australian Feminism. Allen & Unwin.
- Magarey, Susan (2014). Dangerous Ideas: Women's Liberation and Women's Studies Around the World. University of Adelaide Press.
- Randall, D’Arcy (2012). "Seven Writers and Australia's Literary Capital". In Kirkpatrick, P.; Dixon, R. (eds.). Republic of Letters: Literary Communities in Australia. Sydney University Press.
- Sawer, Marian (1996). "Femocrats and Ecorats: Women's Policy Machinery in Australia, Canada and New Zealand". United Nations Research Institute for Social Development. Archived from the original on 16 June 2002.
- Sawer, Marian (1990). Sisters in Suits: Women and Public Policy in Australia. Crows Nest: Allen & Unwin.
- Smart, Judith; Swain, Shurlee, eds. (2 May 2014). The Encyclopedia of Women and Leadership in Twentieth-Century Australia. Australian Women’s Archives Project. Dowse, Sara.
- Wilde, W. H.; Hooton, J.; Andrews, B. (1994). The Oxford Companion to Australian Literature. Oxford University Press.
- Yeatman, Anna (1990). Bureaucrats, Technocrats, Femocrats: Essays on the Contemporary Australian State. Crows Nest: Allen & Unwin.
- "Supergirl; a silent champion", West Australian, 27 March 1976; "New women’s affairs head stays in the background", Sydney Morning Herald, 31 March 1976; "Shy sister Sarah", The Herald, 4 June 1976;
- "MAGAZINE 'Sexism was so pronounced that you couldn't help but react to it — and I did'". The Canberra Times. Vol. 64, no. 19, 993. Australian Capital Territory, Australia. 7 January 1990. p. 26 – via National Library of Australia.
- "Straight from the heart". The Canberra Times. Vol. 68, no. 21, 510. Australian Capital Territory, Australia. 8 March 1994. p. 4 (THE CANBERRA TIMES BOOK SUPPLEMENT) – via National Library of Australia.
- "Change of cultures", Sydney Morning Herald, 18 March 1995; "The real scribes of Canberra", Canberra Times, 31 January 1997; "The not at all secret seven", Sydney Morning Herald, 14 October 1995; "Return of the seven", Canberra Times, 10 February 1996; "And then there were five", Canberra Times (Panorama), 21 November 1998.
- National Library of Australia oral-history interviews:
  - Sara Dowse by Ann Turner, 22 December 1997
  - Sara Dowse by Biff Ward, 17 January 1991 and 24 December 1998
