= Margaret Barbalet =

Australian novelist and historian

- Born: Margaret Evelyn Hardy; 1949 (age 76–77); Adelaide, South Australia
- Education: University of Adelaide
- Occupations: Novelist, historian and diplomat
- Website: www.margaretbarbalet.com

Margaret Evelyn Barbalet (born 1949) is an Australian novelist, historian and diplomat.

== Biography ==
Born Margaret Evelyn Hardy in Adelaide, South Australia, Barbalet grew up in Tasmania. She completed a Master of Arts in history at the University of Adelaide in 1973.

She was commissioned to write a history of the Adelaide Children's Hospital to celebrate its centenary. The book was launched by Geoffrey Dutton in November 1975. Her second book, Far from a Low Gutter Girl, was based in part on letters by former State wards about their grievances with the system.

Barbalet then turned to fiction, publishing novels and children's books interspersed with short stories, three of which were included in Canberra Tales: Stories, published in 1988.

Aside from writing, she has pursued a varied career, working as a history lecturer and public servant. From 1990 to 2008, she worked for the Department of Foreign Affairs and Trade, including in Kuala Lumpur as second secretary at the Australian High Commission in 1996. She was appointed first secretary at the Australian Embassy in the United Arab Emirates from 2005 to 2008.

== Works ==
=== Non-fiction ===
- The Adelaide Children's Hospital 1876–1976: A history, 1975
- Far from a Low Gutter Girl: The forgotten world of state wards, South Australia, 1887–1940, 1983

=== Novels ===
- Blood in the Rain, 1986
- Steel Beach, 1988
- Lady, Baby, Gypsy, Queen, 1992
- The Presence of Angels, 2001

=== Picture books ===
- The Wolf, illustrated by Jane Tanner, 1991
- Reggie: Queen of the Street, illustrated by Andrew McLean, 2003
