= Scribe (publisher) =

Independent Australian publishing house

- Status: Active
- Founded: 1976
- Founder: Henry Rosenbloom
- Country of origin: Australia, United Kingdom
- Headquarters location: Melbourne
- Distribution: United Book Distributors (Australia); Grantham Book Services (UK); Pansing Distribution (Singapore); Consortium Book Sales & Distribution (North America)
- Publication types: Books
- Official website: scribepublications.com.au

Scribe Publications (or simply Scribe) is an independent publishing house founded by Henry Rosenbloom in Melbourne, Australia in 1976. It established a sister company, Scribe UK, in London in May 2013. Scribe publishes nonfiction and fiction by authors from around the world, including many titles in translation. It publishes over 60 books a year in Australia, over 50 in the United Kingdom, and over 30 in the United States. It has a scout in New York.

Publishers Marketplace describes this publishing house as follows: "Scribe Publications Pty Ltd is a Melbourne-based, independent book publisher, founded by Henry Rosenbloom in 1976. It specialises in quality fiction and serious non-fiction, with a particular emphasis on current affairs & politics, biography, and history, and social, economic, and environmental issues."

In 2017 Books+Publishing interviewed Henry Rosenbloom about the publishing house, what sorts of books they aim to acquire and their book acqusition processes.

Richard Fidler spoke to Henry Rosenbloom in 2010 for ABC Radio about his publishing company.

== Awards ==
It was awarded the prize for "Australian Small Publisher of the Year" for 2006, 2008, 2010, 2011.

== Significant publications ==
=== Fiction ===
- The Low Road – Chris Womersley (2007), Ned Kelly Awards for Crime Writing, Best First Novel winner 2008
- Bereft – Chris Womersley (2010), Indie Book Awards Book of the Year – Fiction winner 2011
- The Animals in That Country – Laura Jean McKay (2020), Aurealis Award for Best Science Fiction Novel winner 2020, Arthur C. Clarke Award winner 2021, Victorian Prize for Literature winner 2021, and Victorian Premier's Prize for Fiction winner 2021
- In Moonland – Miles Allinson (2021), The Age Book of the Year Awards - Fiction winner 2022
